= 2012–13 Újpest FC season =

Újpest FC
2012–13 season
- Chairman: (Belgium) Roderick Duchâtelet
- Manager: (Belgium) Jos Daerden (until 5 March 2013) (Belgium) Marc Lelièvre
- NB 1: 9.
- Hungarian Cup: 2. round
- Hungarian League Cup: Group Stage
- Top goalscorer: League: Péter Kabát (13); All: Péter Kabát (14)
- Highest home attendance: 9,872 v Ferencváros (19 August 2012)
- Lowest home attendance: 150 v Diósgyőr (5 December 2012)
Home colours	Away colours

The 2012–13 season was Újpest Football Club's 107th competitive season, 101st consecutive season in the OTP Bank Liga and 127th year in existence as a football club.

== First team squad ==
Note: Flags indicate national team as defined under FIFA eligibility rules; some limited exceptions apply. Players may hold more than one non-FIFA nationality.

No.	Pos.	Nation	Player
1	GK	HUN	Szabolcs Balajcza
2	MF	HUN	János Nagy
3	DF	HUN	Krisztián Vermes
4	MF	SRB	Filip Stanisavljević
5	DF	ITA	Alessandro Iandoli (loan from (Belgium) St. Truiden)
6	MF	SRB	Dušan Vasiljević
7	MF	HUN	Krisztián Simon
8	DF	HUN	Zoltán Szélesi
9	FW	BRA	Bruno Moraes
15	MF	BEL	Nikolas Proesmans
16	FW	HUN	Bence Lázár
17	DF	ESP	José María Antón
18	MF	FRA	Grégory Christ

No.	Pos.	Nation	Player
19	MF	HUN	Balázs Balogh
20	MF	TOG	Henri Eninful
21	FW	HUN	Mohamed Remili
22	FW	HUN	Péter Kabát
24	DF	HUN	Zoltán Pollák
25	FW	HUN	Richárd Horváth
27	MF	HUN	Dániel Kovács
28	DF	HUN	Ronald Erős
29	DF	HUN	Róbert Litauszki
30	FW	HUN	Balázs Zamostny
32	FW	COD	Bavon Tshibuabua
34	DF	BEL	Naïm Aarab
35	DF	BIH	Bojan Mihajlović

== Transfers ==
=== Summer ===
In: Note: Flags indicate national team as defined under FIFA eligibility rules; some limited exceptions apply. Players may hold more than one non-FIFA nationality.

No.	Pos.	Nation	Player
4	MF	SRB	Filip Stanisavljević (from (Serbia) Javor Ivanjica)
5	DF	ITA	Alessandro Iandoli (from (Belgium) St. Truiden)
6	DF	HUN	Zoltán Takács (loan return from Vasas)
8	DF	HUN	Zoltán Szélesi (from (Netherlands) Nijmegen)
9	FW	BRA	Bruno Moraes (from (Portugal) Leiria)
11	FW	ISR	Yadin Zaris (loan from (Belgium) Standard Liège)
15	DF	HUN	Tamás Rubus (loan return from Vasas)
17	DF	ESP	Chema Antón (from (Austria) Salzburg)
18	MF	FRA	Grégory Christ (from (Belgium) St. Truiden)
31	FW	HUN	Bence Szabó (loan return from Vasas)
32	FW	COD	Bavon Tshibuabua (from (Belgium) Beerschot)
34	DF	BEL	Naïm Aarab (from (Greece) AEL)

Out: Note: Flags indicate national team as defined under FIFA eligibility rules; some limited exceptions apply. Players may hold more than one non-FIFA nationality.

No.	Pos.	Nation	Player
2	DF	HUN	Marcell Fodor (loan to Siófok)
5	DF	HUN	Zoltán Kiss (to Békéscsaba)
9	FW	SRB	Nikon Jevtić (to (Poland) Korona Kielce)
17	MF	HUN	István Bognár (to Mezőkövesd)
18	MF	MNE	Darko Marković
20	MF	HUN	Patrik Nagy (to Kecskemét)
25	DF	HUN	Gábor Dvorschák (to (Germany) Jena)
30	FW	HUN	Balázs Zamostny (loan to Siófok)
32	MF	TOG	Henri Eninful (loan return to (Belgium) Standard Liège)
34	DF	HUN	Zoltán Lipták (to Győr)

=== Winter ===
In: Note: Flags indicate national team as defined under FIFA eligibility rules; some limited exceptions apply. Players may hold more than one non-FIFA nationality.

No.	Pos.	Nation	Player
30	FW	HUN	Balázs Zamostny (loan return from Siófok)
32	MF	HUN	Tamás Egerszegi (loan return from Siófok)

Out: Note: Flags indicate national team as defined under FIFA eligibility rules; some limited exceptions apply. Players may hold more than one non-FIFA nationality.

No.	Pos.	Nation	Player
6	DF	HUN	Zoltán Takács (to Siófok)
8	FW	HUN	Péter Rajczi (to Kecskemét)
10	MF	HUN	Dávid Barczi (loan to (Belgium) St. Truidense)
11	FW	ISR	Yadin Zaris (loan return to (Belgium) Standard Liège)
28	MF	HUN	Tamás Tajthy (to Pápa)
30	FW	HUN	Balázs Zamostny (to Újpest II)
32	MF	HUN	Tamás Egerszegi (loan to (Belgium) St. Truidense)

- List of Hungarian football transfers summer 2012
- List of Hungarian football transfers winter 2012–13

== Statistics ==
=== Appearances and goals ===
Last updated on 2 June 2013.

No.	Pos	Nat	Player	Total		OTP Bank Liga		Hungarian Cup		League Cup	
No.	Pos	Nat	Player	Apps	Goals	Apps	Goals	Apps	Goals	Apps	Goals
1	GK	(Hungary) HUN	Szabolcs Balajcza	31	-44	30	-42	1	-2	0	0
2	MF	(Hungary) HUN	János Nagy	4	0	1	0	0	0	3	0
3	DF	(Hungary) HUN	Krisztián Vermes	24	1	23	1	1	0	0	0
4	MF	(Serbia) SRB	Filip Stanisavljević	17	0	16	0	0	0	1	0
5	DF	(Italy) ITA	Alessandro Iandoli	27	0	26	0	1	0	0	0
6	MF	(Serbia) SRB	Dušan Vasiljević	28	7	28	7	0	0	0	0
7	MF	(Hungary) HUN	Krisztián Simon	22	2	20	2	1	0	1	0
8	DF	(Hungary) HUN	Zoltán Szélesi	28	0	27	0	1	0	0	0
9	FW	(Brazil) BRA	Bruno Moraes	9	4	9	4	0	0	0	0
15	MF	(Belgium) BEL	Nikolas Proesmans	12	0	11	0	0	0	1	0
16	FW	(Hungary) HUN	Bence Lázár	8	0	8	0	0	0	0	0
17	DF	(Spain) ESP	Chema Antón	27	2	26	2	1	0	0	0
18	MF	(France) FRA	Grégory Christ	29	1	28	1	1	0	0	0
19	MF	(Hungary) HUN	Balázs Balogh	30	1	29	1	1	0	0	0
20	MF	(Togo) TOG	Henri Eninful	5	0	1	0	0	0	4	0
21	FW	(Hungary) HUN	Mohamed Remili	29	3	27	3	1	0	1	0
22	FW	(Hungary) HUN	Péter Kabát	27	14	26	13	1	1	0	0
24	DF	(Hungary) HUN	Zoltán Pollák	10	0	7	0	0	0	3	0
25	FW	(Hungary) HUN	Richárd Horváth	3	2	1	0	0	0	2	2
27	MF	(Hungary) HUN	Dániel Kovács	9	1	7	0	0	0	2	1
28	DF	(Hungary) HUN	Ronald Erős	8	0	2	0	0	0	6	0
29	DF	(Hungary) HUN	Róbert Litauszki	4	0	2	0	0	0	2	0
30	FW	(Hungary) HUN	Balázs Zamostny	4	1	4	1	0	0	0	0
32	FW	(Democratic Republic of the Congo) COD	Bavon Tshibuabua	8	2	8	2	0	0	0	0
34	DF	(Belgium) BEL	Naïm Aarab	10	0	9	0	1	0	0	0
35	DF	(Bosnia and Herzegovina) BIH	Bojan Mihajlović	10	2	9	0	0	0	1	2
Youth players:
3	DF	(Hungary) HUN	Csaba Kálmán	5	1	0	0	0	0	5	1
13	DF	(Hungary) HUN	Tamás Rubus	3	0	0	0	0	0	3	0
14	MF	(Hungary) HUN	Mátyás Magos	2	0	0	0	0	0	2	0
16	MF	(Hungary) HUN	István Bodnár	4	0	0	0	0	0	4	0
19	MF	(Hungary) HUN	Rajmond Toricska	6	2	0	0	0	0	6	2
20	DF	(Hungary) HUN	Balázs Banai	3	0	0	0	0	0	3	0
22	DF	(Hungary) HUN	Ádám Baranyai	4	0	0	0	0	0	4	0
26	DF	(Hungary) HUN	Zsolt Szokol	2	0	0	0	0	0	2	0
31	FW	(Hungary) HUN	Bence Szabó	4	1	0	0	0	0	4	1
35	MF	(Hungary) HUN	Viktor Dombai	4	0	0	0	0	0	4	0
36	GK	(Hungary) HUN	Tamás Horváth	4	-9	0	0	0	0	4	-9
	GK	(Hungary) HUN	Crispin Strommer	1	-5	0	0	0	0	1	-5
	FW	(Hungary) HUN	Bence Kiss	1	0	0	0	0	0	1	0
	MF	(Hungary) HUN	Miklós Resch	1	0	0	0	0	0	1	0
	DF	(Hungary) HUN	Bálint Szlezák	1	0	0	0	0	0	1	0
	DF	(Hungary) HUN	Sándor Molnár	2	0	0	0	0	0	2	0
	MF	(Hungary) HUN	Erik Ádám	2	0	0	0	0	0	2	0
	GK	(Hungary) HUN	Tamás Floszmann	1	-4	0	0	0	0	1	-4
	DF	(Hungary) HUN	Róbert Hammer	1	0	0	0	0	0	1	0
	MF	(Hungary) HUN	Gergő Holdampf	1	0	0	0	0	0	1	0
Players out to loan:
10	MF	(Hungary) HUN	Dávid Barczi	4	0	1	0	0	0	3	0
Players no longer at the club:
11	FW	(Israel) ISR	Yadin Zaris	13	2	12	2	0	0	1	0
20	MF	(Hungary) HUN	Patrik Nagy	1	0	1	0	0	0	0	0

=== Top scorers ===
Includes all competitive matches. The list is sorted by shirt number when total goals are equal.

Last updated on 2 June 2013

Position	Nation	Number	Name	OTP Bank Liga	Hungarian Cup	League Cup	Total
1	(Hungary)	22	Péter Kabát	13	1	0	14
2	(Serbia)	6	Dušan Vasiljević	7	0	0	7
3	(Brazil)	9	Bruno Moraes	4	0	0	4
4	(Hungary)	21	Mohamed Remili	3	0	0	3
5	(Israel)	11	Yadin Zaris	2	0	0	2
6	(Spain)	17	Chema Antón	2	0	0	2
7	(Democratic Republic of the Congo)	32	Bavon Tshibuabua	2	0	0	2
8	(Hungary)	7	Krisztián Simon	2	0	0	2
9	(Hungary)	25	Richárd Horváth	0	0	2	2
10	(Hungary)	19	Rajmond Toricska	0	0	2	2
11	(Bosnia and Herzegovina)	35	Bojan Mihajlović	0	0	2	2
12	(Hungary)	3	Krisztián Vermes	1	0	0	1
13	(Hungary)	19	Balázs Balogh	1	0	0	1
14	(France)	18	Grégory Christ	1	0	0	1
15	(Hungary)	30	Balázs Zamostny	1	0	0	1
16	(Hungary)	3	Csaba Kálmán	0	0	1	1
17	(Hungary)	31	Bence Szabó	0	0	1	1
18	(Hungary)	27	Dániel Kovács	0	0	1	1
/	/	/	Own Goals	1	0	0	1
			TOTALS	39	1	9	49

=== Disciplinary record ===
Includes all competitive matches. Players with 1 card or more included only.

Last updated on 2 June 2013

Position	Nation	Number	Name	OTP Bank Liga		Hungarian Cup		League Cup		Total (Hu Total)	
Position	Nation	Number	Name	Booked	Sent off (straight red)	Booked	Sent off (straight red)	Booked	Sent off (straight red)	Booked	Sent off (straight red)
GK	(Hungary)	1	Szabolcs Balajcza	2	0	0	0	0	0	2 (2)	0 (0)
DF	(Hungary)	3	Krisztián Vermes	4	0	0	0	0	0	4 (4)	0 (0)
MF	(Serbia)	4	Filip Stanisavljević	4	0	0	0	1	0	5 (4)	0 (0)
DF	(Italy)	5	Alessandro Iandoli	2	0	0	0	0	0	2 (2)	0 (0)
MF	(Serbia)	6	Dušan Vasiljević	7	0	0	0	0	0	7 (7)	0 (0)
MF	(Hungary)	7	Krisztián Simon	2	0	0	0	0	0	2 (2)	0 (0)
DF	(Hungary)	8	Zoltán Szélesi	3	1	0	0	0	0	3 (3)	1 (1)
FW	(Brazil)	9	Bruno Moraes	1	0	0	0	0	0	1 (1)	0 (0)
FW	(Israel)	11	Yadin Zaris	1	0	0	0	0	0	1 (1)	0 (0)
DF	(Hungary)	13	Tamás Rubus	0	0	0	0	1	0	1 (0)	0 (0)
MF	(Belgium)	15	Nikolas Proesmans	2	0	0	0	0	0	2 (2)	0 (0)
FW	(Hungary)	16	Bence Lázár	4	0	0	0	0	0	4 (4)	0 (0)
DF	(Spain)	17	Chema Antón	10	1	0	0	0	0	10 (10)	1 (1)
MF	(France)	18	Grégory Christ	9	1	0	0	0	0	9 (9)	1 (1)
MF	(Hungary)	19	Balázs Balogh	4	0	0	0	0	0	4 (4)	0 (0)
DF	(Hungary)	20	Balázs Banai	0	0	0	0	1	0	1 (0)	0 (0)
FW	(Hungary)	21	Mohamed Remili	4	0	0	0	0	0	4 (4)	0 (0)
FW	(Hungary)	22	Péter Kabát	3	1	0	0	0	0	3 (3)	1 (1)
DF	(Hungary)	24	Zoltán Pollák	0	0	0	0	1	0	1 (0)	0 (0)
FW	(Hungary)	25	Richárd Horváth	0	0	0	0	1	0	1 (0)	0 (0)
DF	(Hungary)	28	Ronald Erős	0	0	0	0	1	0	1 (0)	0 (0)
MF	(Hungary)	28	István Bodnár	0	0	0	0	1	0	1 (0)	0 (0)
MF	(Togo)	32	Henri Eninful	0	0	0	0	2	0	2 (0)	0 (0)
DF	(Belgium)	34	Naïm Aarab	2	1	0	0	0	0	2 (2)	1 (1)
DF	(Bosnia and Herzegovina)	35	Bojan Mihajlović	3	0	0	0	1	0	4 (3)	0 (0)
DF	(Hungary)		Csaba Kálmán	0	0	0	0	2	0	2 (0)	0 (0)
DF	(Hungary)		Ádám Baranyai	0	0	0	0	1	0	1 (0)	0 (0)
			TOTALS	67	5	0	0	13	0	80 (67)	5 (5)

=== Overall ===
Games played	37 (30 OTP Bank Liga, 1 Hungarian Cup and 6 Hungarian League Cup)
Games won	13 (11 OTP Bank Liga, 0 Hungarian Cup and 2 Hungarian League Cup)
Games drawn	8 (8 OTP Bank Liga, 0 Hungarian Cup and 0 Hungarian League Cup)
Games lost	16 (11 OTP Bank Liga, 1 Hungarian Cup and 4 Hungarian League Cup)
Goals scored	50
Goals conceded	62
Goal difference	-12
Yellow cards	80
Red cards	5
Worst discipline	(Spain) Chema Antón (10 (yellow card) , 1 (red card) )
Best result	3–0 (H) v Egri FC - OTP Bank Liga - 02-11-2012
Worst result	0–6 (H) v Paksi SE - OTP Bank Liga - 02-03-2013
Most appearances	(Hungary) Szabolcs Balajcza (31 appearances)
Top scorer	(Hungary) Péter Kabát (14 goal)
Points	47/111 (42.34%)

Last updated: 2 June 2013

== Nemzeti Bajnokság I ==
=== Matches ===
27 July 2012 1	Diósgyőr	2–1	Újpest	Miskolc, Borsod-Abaúj-Zemplén County
19:00 CEST	Fernando 29'; Seydi 65'	(Report)	Vermes 42'	Stadium: DVTK Stadion; Attendance: 9,000; Referee: (Hungary) Ádám Németh

5 August 2012 2	Újpest	0–1	Videoton	Budapest, Pest County
15:30 CEST		(Report)	Torghelle 66'	Stadium: Szusza Ferenc Stadium; Attendance: 3,757; Referee: (Hungary) Zoltán Iványi

12 August 2012 3	Paks	2–2	Újpest	Paks, Tolna County
18:30 CEST	Simon 23'; Éger 39'	(Report)	Zaris 19'; Remili 55'	Stadium: Stadion PSE; Attendance: 3,000; Referee: (Hungary) József Erdős

19 August 2012 4	Újpest	2–1	Ferencváros	Budapest, Pest County
16:30 CEST	Kabát 28'; Tshibuabua 90+4'	(Report)	Orosz 90'	Stadium: Szusza Ferenc Stadium; Attendance: 9,827; Referee: (Hungary) Tamás Bognár

24 August 2012 5	MTK Budapest	2–1	Újpest	Budapest, Pest County
19:00 CEST	Iandoli 55' (o.g.); Csiki 73'	(Report)	Kabát 47'	Stadium: Hidegkuti Nándor Stadium; Attendance: 2,000; Referee: (Hungary) Dániel Becséri

2 September 2012 6	Újpest	0–0	Debrecen	Budapest, Pest County
16:30 CEST		(Report)		Stadium: Szusza Ferenc Stadium; Attendance: 3,000; Referee: (Hungary) Mihály Fábián

14 September 2012 7	Kaposvár	0–0	Újpest	Kaposvár, Somogy County
17:00 CEST		(Report)		Stadium: Stadion Kaposvár Rákóczi; Attendance: 1,500; Referee: (Hungary) Viktor Kassai

22 September 2012 8	Újpest	2–1	Kecskemét	Budapest, Pest County
14:00 CEST	Kabát 42'; Vasiljević 45'	(Report)	Litsingi 38'	Stadium: Szusza Ferenc Stadium; Attendance: 2,000; Referee: (Hungary) István Vad

30 September 2012 9	Pécs	1–3	Újpest	Pécs, Baranya County
18:30 CEST	Grumić 5'	(Report)	Simon 6'; Kabát 43'; Vasiljević 72'	Stadium: Stadion PMFC; Attendance: 3,000; Referee: (Hungary) Péter Solymosi

6 October 2012 10	Újpest	1–1	Pápa	Budapest, Pest County
14:00 CEST	Kabát 22'	(Report)	Aarab 78' (o.g.)	Stadium: Szusza Ferenc Stadium; Attendance: 3,422; Referee: (Hungary) Balázs Berke

21 October 2012 11	Győr	3–2	Újpest	Győr, Győr-Moson-Sopron County
18:30 CEST	Varga 60'; Aarab 82' (o.g.); Kamber 90+2'	(Report)	Kabát 47', 56' (pen.)	Stadium: ETO Park; Attendance: 5,800; Referee: (Hungary) János Takács

27 October 2012 12	Budapest Honvéd	2–2	Újpest	Budapest, Pest County
14:00 CEST	Délczeg 9' (pen.); Abass 65'	(Report)	Kabát 45'; Zaris 73'	Stadium: Bozsik Stadion; Attendance: 4,000; Referee: (Hungary) Mihály Fábián

2 November 2012 13	Újpest	3–0	Eger	Budapest, Pest County
19:00 CET	Vasiljević 14'; Moraes 65'; Balogh 87'	(Report)		Stadium: Szusza Ferenc Stadium; Attendance: 2,800; Referee: (Hungary) Zsolt Szabó

10 November 2012 14	Haladás	2–0	Újpest	Szombathely, Vas County
14:00 CET	Iszlai 70' (pen.); Kenesei 90+3'	(Report)		Stadium: Rohonci Street Stadium; Attendance: 1,800; Referee: (Hungary) Sándor Andó-Szabó

16 November 2012 15	Újpest	4–2	Siófok	Budapest, Pest County
19:00 CET	Moraes 27'; Kabát 64', 90+1'; Antón 84'	(Report)	Melczer 20', 37'	Stadium: Szusza Ferenc Stadium; Attendance: 3,000; Referee: (Hungary) Viktor Kassai

25 November 2012 16	Újpest	1–1	Diósgyőr	Budapest, Pest County
16:30 CET	Moraes 19'	(Report)	Tisza 66'	Stadium: Szusza Ferenc Stadium; Attendance: 3,612; Referee: (Hungary) Péter Solymosi

2 December 2012 17	Videoton	1–1	Újpest	Székesfehérvár, Fejér County
16:30 CET	Neto 26'	(Report)	Remili 8'	Stadium: Sóstói Stadion; Attendance: 2,854; Referee: (Hungary) Viktor Kassai

2 March 2013 18	Újpest	0–6	Paks	Budapest, Pest County
16:00 CET		(Report)	Lázok 16' (pen.), 36', 70', 78'; Tököli 39', 81'	Stadium: Szusza Ferenc Stadium; Attendance: 2,717; Referee: (Hungary) Dániel Becséri

10 March 2013 19	Ferencváros	2–1	Újpest	Budapest, Pest County
16:30 CET	Somália 41'; Čukić 90+3'	(Report)	Kabát 51'	Stadium: Stadion Albert Flórián; Attendance: 16,000; Referee: (Hungary) Péter Solymosi

30 April 2013 20	Újpest	1–1	MTK Budapest	Budapest, Pest County
18:00 CEST	Vasiljević 12'	(Report)	Kanta 90'	Stadium: Szusza Ferenc Stadium; Attendance: 2,500; Referee: (Hungary) Sándor Andó-Szabó

31 March 2013 21	Debrecen	0–1	Újpest	Debrecen, Hajdú-Bihar County
16:30 CEST		(Report)	Šimac 9' (o.g.)	Stadium: Stadion Oláh Gábor Út; Attendance: 2,500; Referee: (Hungary) Tamás Bognár

5 April 2013 22	Újpest	1–0	Kaposvár	Budapest, Pest County
17:00 CEST	Vasiljević 32'	(Report)		Stadium: Szusza Ferenc Stadium; Attendance: 1,000; Referee: (Hungary) Ádám Németh

14 April 2013 23	Kecskemét	1–0	Újpest	Kecskemét, Bács-Kiskun County
18:30 CEST	Mogyorósi 61'	(Report)		Stadium: Széktói Stadion; Attendance: 2,122; Referee: (Hungary) Sándor Andó-Szabó

19 April 2013 24	Újpest	4–2	Pécs	Budapest, Pest County
19:00 CEST	Kabát 2', 7' (pen.); Moraes 19'; Vasiljević 79'	(Report)	Wittrédi 35'; Simon 81'	Stadium: Szusza Ferenc Stadium; Attendance: 2,680; Referee: (Hungary) Ádám Farkas

27 April 2013 25	Pápa	0–1	Újpest	Pápa, Veszprém County
16:00 CEST		(Report)	Antón 80'	Stadium: Stadion Várkerti; Attendance: 2,700; Referee: (Hungary) Gábor Oláh

5 May 2013 26	Újpest	1–2	Győr	Budapest, Pest County
16:30 CEST	Vasiljević 30'	(Report)	Andrić 56'; Střeštík 90+3'	Stadium: Szusza Ferenc Stadium; Attendance: 3,548; Referee: (Hungary) Péter Solymosi

11 May 2013 27	Újpest	2–4	Budapest Honvéd	Budapest, Pest County
18:30 CEST	Christ 86'; Remili 90+2'	(Report)	Martínez 8', 52', 69'; Lovrić 19'	Stadium: Szusza Ferenc Stadium; Attendance: 3,000; Referee: (Hungary) Zsolt Szabó

18 May 2013 28	Eger	1–2	Újpest	Vác, Pest County
16:00 CEST	Horváth 76'	(Report)	Tshibuabua 24'; Simon 72'	Stadium: Stadion Városi Vác; Attendance: 100; Referee: (Hungary) Mihály Fábián

24 May 2013 29	Újpest	0–1	Haladás	Budapest, Pest County
17:00 CEST		(Report)	Radó 90'	Stadium: Szusza Ferenc Stadium; Attendance: 2,284; Referee: (Hungary) Erdös József

2 June 2013 30	Siófok	0–1	Újpest	Siófok, Somogy County
16:30 CEST		(Report)	Zamostny 90'	Stadium: Révész Street Stadium; Attendance: 2,200; Referee: (Hungary) Ádám Farkas

=== Classification ===
Pos	Team	Pld	W	D	L	GF	GA	GD	Pts
7	Kecskemét	30	12	8	10	42	42	0	44
8	Haladás	30	11	11	8	36	27	+9	44
9	Újpest	30	11	8	11	40	42	−2	41
10	Diósgyőr	30	9	11	10	31	39	−8	38
11	Kaposvári Rákóczi	30	10	7	13	35	38	−3	37

Source: mlsz.hu (in Hungarian)
Rules for classification: 1st points; 2nd overall wins; 3rd goal difference; 4th head-to-head points; 5th head-to-head goal difference; 6th head-to-head away goals scored; 7th fair-play points; 8th drawing of lots

=== Results summary ===
Overall								Home						Away					
Pld	W	D	L	GF	GA	GD	Pts	W	D	L	GF	GA	GD	W	D	L	GF	GA	GD
30	11	8	11	40	42	−2	41	6	4	5	22	23	−1	5	4	6	18	19	−1

Last updated: 2 June 2013.
Source: NB1

=== Results by round ===
Round	1	2	3	4	5	6	7	8	9	10	11	12	13	14	15	16	17	18	19	20	21	22	23	24	25	26	27	28	29	30
Ground	A	H	A	H	A	H	A	H	A	H	A	A	H	A	H	H	A	H	A	H	A	H	A	H	A	H	H	A	H	A
Result	L	L	D	W	L	D	D	W	W	D	L	D	W	L	W	D	D	L	L	D	W	W	L	W	W	L	L	W	L	W
Position	13	16	14	11	11	12	13	11	8	8	9	10	9	11	8	8	10	11	12	13	12	10	12	9	8	8	9	9	9	9

Updated to match(es) played on 2 June 2013. Source: Matches
A = Away; H = Home; W = Win; D = Draw; L = Loss

== Hungarian Cup ==
26 September 2012 Round 2	Kazincbarcikai SC	2–1	Újpest FC	Kazincbarcika, Borsod-Abaúj-Zemplén County
15:30 CEST	Chupe 27'; Szélesi 89' (o.g.)	(Report)	Kabát 67'	Stadium: Pete András Stadion; Attendance: 1,000; Referee: (Hungary) József Erdős

== League Cup ==
=== Group stage ===
5 September 2012 1	Diósgyőr	3–2	Újpest	Miskolc, Borsod-Abaúj-Zemplén County
18:00 CEST	Tisza 26', 69', 79'	(Report)	Horváth 81', 90+1' (pen.)	Stadium: DVTK Stadion; Attendance: 1,400; Referee: (Hungary) Gergely Szőts

7 September 2012 2	Újpest	2–5	Eger	Budapest, Pest County
14:00 CEST	Kálmán 6'; Szabó 75'	(Report)	Piller 32'; Koós 37', 76'; Németh 55'; Tchami 86'	Stadium: Szusza Ferenc Stadium; Attendance: 200; Referee: (Hungary) Szabolcs Szilasi

10 October 2012 3	Újpest	2–1	Debrecen	Budapest, Pest County
17:00 CEST	Toricska 41', 62'	(Report)	Kulcsár 48' (pen.)	Stadium: Szusza Ferenc Stadium; Attendance: 300; Referee: (Hungary) János Takács

14 October 2012 4	Debrecen	3–0	Újpest	Debrecen, Hajdú-Bihar County
18:30 CEST	Korhut 28' (pen.), 70'; Coulibaly 37'	(Report)		Stadium: Stadion Oláh Gábor Út; Attendance: 1,200; Referee: (Hungary) Gábor Oláh

13 November 2012 5	Eger	4–0	Újpest	Eger, Heves County
13:00 CET	Horváth 4', 37', 40'; Albert 20'	(Report)		Stadium: Szentmarjay Tibor Városi Stadion; Attendance: 100; Referee: (Hungary) Balázs Böcskei

5 December 2012 6	Újpest	3–2	Diósgyőr	Budapest, Pest County
15:00 CET	Kovács 35'; Mihajlović 37', 87'	(Report)	Nagy 59'; Tisza 90+2' (pen.)	Stadium: Szusza Ferenc Stadium; Attendance: 150; Referee: (Hungary) Dániel Becséri

==== Classification ====
Pos	Team	Pld	W	D	L	GF	GA	GD	Pts	Qualification
1	Debrecen	6	4	0	2	13	6	+7	12	Advance to knockout phase
2	Eger	6	4	0	2	13	9	+4	12	Advance to knockout phase
3	Diósgyőr	6	2	0	4	11	13	−2	6	
4	Újpest	6	2	0	4	9	18	−9	6	

Rules for classification: 1) points; 2) goal difference; 3) number of goals scored.
