= 2011–12 Újpest FC season =

Újpest FC
2011–12 season
- Chairman: (Hungary) István Csehi
- Manager: (Hungary) Géza Mészöly (until 10 August 2011) (Serbia) Zoran Spisljak (until 11 April 2012) (Belgium) Marc Leliévre
- NB 1: 13.
- Hungarian Cup: Semi-final
- Hungarian League Cup: Group Stage
- Top goalscorer: League: (Hungary) Péter Rajczi (8); All: (Hungary) Péter Rajczi (12) (Hungary) Péter Kabát (12)
- Highest home attendance: 10,000 v FTC (12 May 2012)
- Lowest home attendance: 300 v Paks (31 August 2011)
Home colours	Away colours

The 2011–12 season was Újpest Football Club's 106th competitive season, 100th consecutive season in the OTP Bank Liga and 126th year in existence as a football club.

== First team squad ==
Note: Flags indicate national team as defined under FIFA eligibility rules; some limited exceptions apply. Players may hold more than one non-FIFA nationality.

No.	Pos.	Nation	Player
1	GK	HUN	Szabolcs Balajcza
2	DF	HUN	Marcell Fodor
3	DF	HUN	Krisztián Vermes
4	MF	HUN	Szabolcs Üveges
5	DF	HUN	Zoltán Kiss
6	MF	SRB	Dušan Vasiljević
7	MF	HUN	Krisztián Simon
8	FW	HUN	Péter Rajczi
9	MF	SRB	Nikon Jevtić
10	MF	HUN	Dávid Barczi
11	MF	HUN	Bertold Popovics
14	MF	HUN	Mátyás Magos
15	MF	BEL	Nikolas Proesmans
16	FW	HUN	Bence Lázár
17	MF	HUN	István Bognár
18	MF	MNE	Darko Marković

No.	Pos.	Nation	Player
19	MF	HUN	Balázs Balogh
20	MF	HUN	Patrik Nagy
21	MF	HUN	Mohamed Remili
22	FW	HUN	Péter Kabát
24	DF	HUN	Zoltán Pollák
25	DF	HUN	Gábor Dvorschák
26	DF	HUN	Zsolt Szokol
27	MF	HUN	Dániel Kovács
28	MF	HUN	Tamás Tajthy
29	DF	HUN	Róbert Litauszki
30	FW	HUN	Balázs Zamostny
32	MF	TOG	Henri Eninful (loan from Standard Liège)
33	MF	HUN	Electo Wilson
34	DF	HUN	Zoltán Lipták
35	DF	BIH	Bojan Mihajlović

== Transfers ==
=== Summer ===
In: Note: Flags indicate national team as defined under FIFA eligibility rules; some limited exceptions apply. Players may hold more than one non-FIFA nationality.

No.	Pos.	Nation	Player
2	DF	HUN	Csaba Fehér (from (Netherlands) NAC Breda)
4	MF	HUN	Szabolcs Üveges (from (Italy) Parma F.C.)
7	FW	HUN	Krisztián Simon (loan return from (Netherlands) Feyenoord)
9	FW	HUN	Ádám Balajti (loan from Debreceni VSC)
10	FW	HUN	Tibor Tisza (loan return from (Belgium) K. Sint-Truidense V.V.)
18	MF	MNE	Darko Marković (from (Montenegro) FK Dečić)
20	MF	HUN	Patrik Nagy (loan from (Austria) SK Rapid Wien)
22	FW	HUN	Péter Kabát (from Debreceni VSC)
27	FW	HUN	Mohamed Remili (loan return from Szolnoki MÁV FC)
34	DF	HUN	Zoltán Lipták (from Videoton FC)
35	DF	BIH	Bojan Mihajlovic (from (Bosnia and Herzegovina) FK Drina Zvornik)

Out: Note: Flags indicate national team as defined under FIFA eligibility rules; some limited exceptions apply. Players may hold more than one non-FIFA nationality.

No.	Pos.	Nation	Player
2	DF	HUN	Csaba Fehér (unattached)
5	MF	CRO	Marin Matoš (to (Croatia) HNK Cibalia)
6	DF	BRA	Jhonnes (to (Croatia) NK Varaždin)
7	FW	HUN	Ádám Balajti (loan return to Debreceni VSC)
9	FW	HUN	Illés Sitku (loan return to Videoton FC)
10	FW	HUN	Tibor Tisza (to Diósgyőri VTK)
11	MF	HUN	Péter Simek (to Vasas SC)
13	MF	HUN	Zoltán Böőr (to Rákospalotai EAC)
14	MF	SRB	Nikola Mitrovic (to Videoton FC)
32	FW	EST	Jarmo Ahjupera (loan return to Győri ETO FC)
––	GK	HUN	Dániel Bordás (to Orosháza FC)

=== Winter ===
In: Note: Flags indicate national team as defined under FIFA eligibility rules; some limited exceptions apply. Players may hold more than one non-FIFA nationality.

No.	Pos.	Nation	Player
2	DF	HUN	Marcell Fodor (from Debreceni VSC)
6	MF	SRB	Dušan Vasiljević (from Videoton FC)
9	FW	SRB	Nikon Jevtić (from (Austria) SC Wiener Neustadt)
15	MF	BEL	Nikolas Proesmans (from (Belgium) K. Sint-Truidense V.V.)
32	MF	TOG	Henri Eninful (on loan from (Belgium) Standard Liège)
—	GK	HUN	Tamás Floszmann (from Dunaújváros Pálhalma SE)
—	MF	HUN	Bálint Tóth (from Újpest FC II)

Out: Note: Flags indicate national team as defined under FIFA eligibility rules; some limited exceptions apply. Players may hold more than one non-FIFA nationality.

No.	Pos.	Nation	Player
2	DF	NED	Ferne Snoyl
3	DF	HUN	Vilmos Szalai (to (Germany) Wormatia Worms)
6	DF	HUN	Zoltán Takács (on loan to Vasas SC)
9	FW	HUN	Ádám Balajti (loan return to Debreceni VSC)
15	DF	HUN	Tamás Rubus (on loan to Vasas SC)
23	GK	HUN	Antal Bozsó (to Soproni VSE)
31	FW	HUN	Bence Szabó (on loan to Vasas SC)
32	MF	HUN	Tamás Egerszegi (on loan to BFC Siófok)
42	FW	HUN	Attila Széki
—	FW	HUN	Dávid Erős (on loan to Várpalotai Bányász)
—	FW	HUN	Dávid Kocsis (to Szolnoki MÁV FC)
—	DF	HUN	Tamás Petrezselyem (to Dunakeszi VSE)

- List of Hungarian football transfer summer 2011
- List of Hungarian football transfers winter 2011–12

== Statistics ==
=== Appearances and goals ===
Last updated on 27 May 2012.

No.	Pos	Nat	Player	Total		OTP Bank Liga		Hungarian Cup		League Cup	
No.	Pos	Nat	Player	Apps	Goals	Apps	Goals	Apps	Goals	Apps	Goals
1	GK	(Hungary) HUN	Szabolcs Balajcza	38	-61	30	-49	7	-11	1	-1
2	DF	(Hungary) HUN	Marcell Fodor	5	0	4	0	1	0	0	0
3	DF	(Hungary) HUN	Krisztián Vermes	1	0	1	0	0	0	0	0
4	MF	(Hungary) HUN	Szabolcs Üveges	11	1	5	0	1	0	5	1
5	DF	(Hungary) HUN	Zoltán Kiss	12	0	9	0	2	0	1	0
6	MF	(Serbia) SRB	Dušan Vasiljević	16	4	13	4	3	0	0	0
7	MF	(Hungary) HUN	Krisztián Simon	30	4	22	2	5	1	3	1
8	FW	(Hungary) HUN	Péter Rajczi	30	12	21	8	5	1	4	3
9	FW	(Serbia) SRB	Nikon Jevtić	3	0	2	0	1	0	0	0
10	MF	(Hungary) HUN	Dávid Barczi	34	5	23	0	8	2	3	3
11	MF	(Hungary) HUN	Bertold Popovics	4	0	1	0	0	0	3	0
14	MF	(Hungary) HUN	Mátyás Magos	6	1	3	0	1	1	2	0
15	MF	(Belgium) BEL	Nikolas Proesmans	8	1	5	0	3	1	0	0
16	FW	(Hungary) HUN	Bence Lázár	18	2	12	1	5	0	1	1
17	MF	(Hungary) HUN	István Bognár	2	1	1	0	0	0	1	1
18	MF	(Montenegro) MNE	Darko Marković	25	3	16	1	4	1	5	1
19	MF	(Hungary) HUN	Balázs Balogh	34	6	25	3	5	1	4	2
20	MF	(Hungary) HUN	Patrik Nagy	19	0	12	0	5	0	2	0
21	MF	(Hungary) HUN	Mohamed Remili	19	6	12	1	6	4	1	1
22	FW	(Hungary) HUN	Péter Kabát	28	12	22	7	6	5	0	0
24	DF	(Hungary) HUN	Zoltán Pollák	30	1	23	0	6	1	1	0
25	DF	(Hungary) HUN	Gábor Dvorschák	19	2	16	2	2	0	1	0
26	DF	(Hungary) HUN	Zsolt Szokol	20	0	15	0	4	0	1	0
27	MF	(Hungary) HUN	Dániel Kovács	15	1	9	1	3	0	3	0
28	MF	(Hungary) HUN	Tamás Tajthy	18	0	13	0	4	0	1	0
29	DF	(Hungary) HUN	Róbert Litauszki	15	0	11	0	4	0	0	0
30	FW	(Hungary) HUN	Balázs Zamostny	11	0	6	0	2	0	3	0
32	MF	(Togo) TOG	Henri Eninful	12	0	10	0	2	0	0	0
33	MF	(Hungary) HUN	Electo Wilson	10	1	7	0	0	0	3	1
34	DF	(Hungary) HUN	Zoltán Lipták	14	1	11	1	3	0	0	0
35	DF	(Bosnia and Herzegovina) BIH	Bojan Mihajlović	35	2	24	1	6	1	5	0
Youth players
4	DF	(Hungary) HUN	Ádám Privigyei	4	0	0	0	0	0	4	0
13	MF	(Hungary) HUN	Viktor Dombai	5	0	0	0	0	0	5	0
21	MF	(Hungary) HUN	Balázs Banai	3	0	0	0	0	0	3	0
36	GK	(Hungary) HUN	Tamás Horváth	6	-15	0	0	1	-1	5	-14
––	MF	(Hungary) HUN	Márk Horváth	1	0	0	0	0	0	1	0
––	DF	(Hungary) HUN	János Nagy	1	0	0	0	0	0	1	0
––	MF	(Hungary) HUN	Bálint Tóth	1	0	0	0	0	0	1	0
Players currently out on loan
6	DF	(Hungary) HUN	Zoltán Takács	7	1	3	0	1	0	3	1
15	DF	(Hungary) HUN	Tamás Rubus	8	0	4	0	1	0	3	0
31	FW	(Hungary) HUN	Bence Szabó	5	1	0	0	1	0	4	1
32	MF	(Hungary) HUN	Tamás Egerszegi	16	1	12	1	2	0	2	0
Players no longer at the club:
2	DF	(Hungary) HUN	Csaba Fehér	1	0	1	0	0	0	0	0
2	DF	(Netherlands) NED	Ferne Snoyl	3	0	2	0	0	0	1	0
3	DF	(Hungary) HUN	Vilmos Szalai	3	0	0	0	0	0	3	0
9	FW	(Hungary) HUN	Ádám Balajti	8	1	4	1	2	0	2	0
13	MF	(Hungary) HUN	Zoltán Böőr	5	0	5	0	0	0	0	0
––	FW	(Hungary) HUN	Dávid Kocsis	1	0	0	0	0	0	1	0

=== Top scorers ===
Includes all competitive matches. The list is sorted by shirt number when total goals are equal.

Last updated on 27 May 2012

Position	Nation	Number	Name	OTP Bank Liga	Hungarian Cup	League Cup	Total
1	(Hungary)	8	Péter Rajczi	8	1	3	12
2	(Hungary)	22	Péter Kabát	7	5	0	12
3	(Hungary)	19	Balázs Balogh	3	1	2	6
4	(Hungary) (Algeria)	21	Mohamed Remili	1	4	1	6
5	(Hungary)	10	Dávid Barczi	0	2	3	5
6	(Serbia)	6	Dušan Vasiljević	4	0	0	4
7	(Hungary)	7	Krisztián Simon	2	1	1	4
8	(Montenegro)	18	Darko Marković	1	1	1	3
9	(Hungary)	25	Gábor Dvorschák	2	0	0	2
10	(Bosnia and Herzegovina)	35	Bojan Mihajlović	1	1	0	2
11	(Hungary)	16	Bence Lázár	1	0	1	2
12	(Hungary)	32	Tamás Egerszegi	1	0	0	1
13	(Hungary)	27	Dániel Kovács	1	0	0	1
14	(Hungary)	9	Ádám Balajti	1	0	0	1
15	(Hungary)	34	Zoltán Lipták	1	0	0	1
16	(Hungary)	14	Mátyás Magos	0	1	0	1
17	(Belgium)	15	Nikolas Proesmans	0	1	0	1
18	(Hungary)	24	Zoltán Pollák	0	1	0	1
19	(Hungary)	17	István Bognár	0	0	1	1
20	(Hungary)	4	Szabolcs Üveges	0	0	1	1
21	(Hungary)	31	Bence Szabó	0	0	1	1
22	(Hungary)	6	Zoltán Takács	0	0	1	1
23	(Hungary) (Brazil)	33	Electo Wilson	0	0	1	1
/	/	/	Own Goals	0	0	0	0
			TOTALS	34	19	17	70

=== Disciplinary record ===
Includes all competitive matches. Players with 1 card or more included only.

Last updated on 27 May 2012

Position	Nation	Number	Name	OTP Bank Liga		Hungarian Cup		League Cup		Total (Hu Total)	
Position	Nation	Number	Name	Booked	Sent off (straight red)	Booked	Sent off (straight red)	Booked	Sent off (straight red)	Booked	Sent off (straight red)
GK	(Hungary)	1	Szabolcs Balajcza	2	0	0	0	0	0	2 (2)	0 (0)
DF	(Hungary)	2	Marcell Fodor	1	0	0	0	0	0	1 (1)	0 (0)
DF	(Netherlands)	2	Ferne Snoyl	0	0	0	0	1	0	1 (0)	0 (0)
MF	(Hungary)	4	Szabolcs Üveges	1	0	0	0	0	0	1 (1)	0 (0)
DF	(Hungary)	5	Zoltán Kiss	2	0	1	0	0	0	3 (2)	0 (0)
MF	(Serbia)	6	Dušan Vasiljević	5	0	0	0	0	0	5 (5)	0 (0)
DF	(Hungary)	6	Zoltán Takács	1	0	0	0	1	0	2 (1)	0 (0)
MF	(Hungary)	7	Krisztián Simon	1	0	0	0	0	0	1 (1)	0 (0)
FW	(Hungary)	8	Péter Rajczi	7	3	1	0	0	1	8 (7)	4 (3)
FW	(Serbia)	9	Nikon Jevtić	0	0	1	0	0	0	1 (0)	0 (0)
MF	(Hungary)	10	Dávid Barczi	2	0	1	0	0	0	3 (2)	0 (0)
MF	(Hungary)	13	Zoltán Böőr	1	0	0	0	0	0	1 (1)	0 (0)
MF	(Hungary)	13	Viktor Dombai	0	0	0	0	1	0	1 (0)	0 (0)
MF	(Belgium)	15	Nikolas Proesmans	1	0	0	0	0	0	1 (1)	0 (0)
DF	(Hungary)	15	Tamás Rubus	0	0	0	1	1	0	1 (0)	1 (0)
FW	(Hungary)	16	Bence Lázár	3	0	0	0	0	0	3 (3)	0 (0)
MF	(Montenegro)	18	Darko Marković	5	0	0	0	1	0	6 (5)	0 (0)
MF	(Hungary)	19	Balázs Balogh	0	0	1	0	0	0	1 (0)	0 (0)
MF	(Hungary)	20	Patrik Nagy	1	0	0	0	0	0	1 (1)	0 (0)
FW	(Hungary)	21	Mohamed Remili	1	0	1	0	0	0	2 (1)	0 (0)
FW	(Hungary)	22	Péter Kabát	7	0	1	0	0	0	8 (7)	0 (0)
DF	(Hungary)	24	Zoltán Pollák	6	1	1	0	0	0	7 (6)	1 (1)
DF	(Hungary)	25	Gábor Dvorschák	4	0	0	0	0	0	4 (4)	0 (0)
DF	(Hungary)	26	Zsolt Szokol	2	1	0	0	0	0	2 (2)	1 (1)
MF	(Hungary)	27	Dániel Kovács	1	0	0	0	0	0	1 (1)	0 (0)
MF	(Hungary)	28	Tamás Tajthy	1	0	1	0	0	0	2 (1)	0 (0)
DF	(Hungary)	29	Róbert Litauszki	2	0	0	0	0	0	2 (2)	0 (0)
FW	(Hungary)	30	Balázs Zamostny	0	0	1	0	0	0	1 (0)	0 (0)
MF	(Togo)	32	Henri Eninful	2	0	0	0	0	0	2 (2)	0 (0)
DF	(Hungary)	32	Tamás Egerszegi	0	0	1	0	0	0	1 (0)	0 (0)
DF	(Hungary)	34	Zoltán Lipták	6	1	2	0	0	0	8 (6)	1 (1)
DF	(Bosnia and Herzegovina)	35	Bojan Mihajlović	4	1	1	0	0	0	5 (4)	1 (1)
MF	(Hungary)		Ádám Privigyei	0	0	0	0	1	0	1 (0)	0 (0)
			TOTALS	68	7	15	1	6	1	89 (68)	9 (7)

=== Overall ===
Games played	44 (30 OTP Bank Liga, 8 Hungarian Cup and 6 Hungarian League Cup)
Games won	14 (8 OTP Bank Liga, 3 Hungarian Cup and 3 Hungarian League Cup)
Games drawn	11 (8 OTP Bank Liga, 2 Hungarian Cup and 1 Hungarian League Cup)
Games lost	19 (14 OTP Bank Liga, 3 Hungarian Cup and 2 Hungarian League Cup)
Goals scored	70
Goals conceded	73
Goal difference	-3
Yellow cards	89
Red cards	9
Worst discipline	(Hungary) Péter Rajczi (8 (yellow card) , 4 (red card) )
Best result	4–0 (H) v Bajai LSE - Hungarian Cup - 13–03–2012
Worst result	1–5 (H) v Debreceni VSC - OTP Bank Liga - 01–04–2012
Most appearances	(Hungary) Szabolcs Balajcza (38 appearances)
Top scorer	(Hungary) Péter Kabát (12 goals)
Top scorer	(Hungary) Péter Rajczi (12 goals)
Points	55/133 (41.35%)

Last updated: 27 May 2012

== Nemzeti Bajnokság I ==
=== Matches ===
16 July 2011 1	Újpest FC	0–1	Lombard-Pápa TFC	Budapest, Pest County
20:00 CET (UTC+01)		(Report)	Marić 81'	Stadium: Szusza Ferenc Stadium; Attendance: 4,000; Referee: (Hungary) Gábor Oláh

23 July 2011 2	Győri ETO FC	1–0	Újpest FC	Győr, Győr-Moson-Sopron County
20:00 CET (UTC+01)	Pilibaitis 53'	(Report)		Stadium: ETO Park; Attendance: 4,000; Referee: (Hungary) Péter Solymosi

30 July 2011 3	BFC Siófok	2–0	Újpest FC	Siófok, Somogy County
19:00 CET (UTC+01)	Haraszti 1'; Huszák 45'	(Report)		Stadium: Révész Street Stadium; Attendance: 5,000; Referee: (Hungary) Balázs Berke

7 August 2011 4	Újpest FC	0–2	Paksi SE	Budapest, Pest County
18:00 CET (UTC+01)		(Report)	Éger 59' (pen.); Vayer 90' (pen.)	Stadium: Szusza Ferenc Stadium; Attendance: 3,508; Referee: (Hungary) Ádám Farkas

14 August 2011 5	Kaposvári Rákóczi FC	2–2	Újpest FC	Kaposvár, Somogy County
18:00 CET (UTC+01)	Perić 7' 85'	(Report)	Dvorschák 47'; Rajczi 88'	Stadium: Stadion Kaposvár Rákóczi; Attendance: 3,500; Referee: (Hungary) József Berger

21 August 2011 6	Újpest FC	1–1	Diósgyőri VTK	Budapest, Pest County
16:00 CET (UTC+01)	Kabát 51'	(Report)	Seydi 68'	Stadium: Szusza Ferenc Stadium; Attendance: 3,500; Referee: (Hungary) Zoltán J. Kovács

28 August 2011 7	Debreceni VSC	3–2	Újpest FC	Debrecen, Hajdú-Bihar County
16:00 CET (UTC+01)	Bódi 22'; Yannick 49'; Coulibaly 63'	(Report)	Egerszegi 37'; Simon 74'	Stadium: Stadion Oláh Gábor Út; Attendance: 7,500; Referee: (Hungary) Zoltán Iványi

10 September 2011 8	Újpest FC	4–1	Pécsi Mecsek FC	Budapest, Pest County
15:00 CET (UTC+01)	Dvorschák 13'; Mihajlović 18'; Kabát 85' (pen.); Rajczi 90+2'	(Report)	Andorka 51'	Stadium: Szusza Ferenc Stadium; Attendance: 2,811; Referee: (Hungary) Sándor Andó-Szabó

17 September 2011 9	Budapest Honvéd FC	2–0	Újpest FC	Budapest, Pest County
17:30 CET (UTC+01)	Danilo 61' (pen.) 71'	(Report)		Stadium: Bozsik Stadion; Attendance: 3,400; Referee: (Hungary) Zoltán Iványi

24 September 2011 10	Újpest FC	4–1	Szombathelyi Haladás	Budapest, Pest County
17:30 CET (UTC+01)	Rajczi 34' (pen.) 37'; Balogh 52' 90+2'	(Report)	Schimmer 56'	Stadium: Szusza Ferenc Stadium; Attendance: 3,700; Referee: (Hungary) Roland Veizer

1 October 2011 11	Vasas SC	3–0	Újpest FC	Budapest, Pest County
17:30 CET (UTC+01)	Dajić 8'; Bárányos 31'; Beliczky 38'	(Report)		Stadium: Stadion Rudolf Illovszky; Attendance: 3,000; Referee: (Hungary) János Takács

16 October 2011 12	Újpest FC	4–2	Zalaegerszegi TE	Budapest, Pest County
16:00 CET (UTC+01)	Rajczi 6' 65' (pen.); Simon 23'; Marković 69'	(Report)	Kamber 61' 75'	Stadium: Szusza Ferenc Stadium; Attendance: 2,500; Referee: (Hungary) Szabolcs Szilasi

22 October 2011 13	Ferencvárosi TC	3–0	Újpest FC	Budapest, Pest County
15:00 CET (UTC+01)	Pölöskey 7'; Somália 38'; Lisztes 90+2'	(Report)		Stadium: Stadion Albert Flórián; Attendance: 12,500; Referee: (Hungary) Viktor Kassai

29 October 2011 14	Újpest FC	3–1	Kecskeméti TE	Budapest, Pest County
17:30 CET (UTC+01)	Kovács 38'; Rajczi 87' (pen.); Balajti 90+2'	(Report)	Foxi 66'	Stadium: Szusza Ferenc Stadium; Attendance: 2,000; Referee: (Hungary) Tamás Bognár

6 November 2011 15	Videoton FC	3–0	Újpest FC	Székesfehérvár, Fejér County
16:00 CET (UTC+01)	Nikolić 79' 82'; Alves 85'	(Report)		Stadium: Stadion Sóstói; Attendance: 4,150; Referee: (Hungary) Mihály Fábián

18 November 2011 16	Lombard-Pápa TFC	0–1	Újpest FC	Pápa, Veszprém County
18:00 CET (UTC+01)		(Report)	Lázár 68'	Stadium: Stadion Várkerti; Attendance: 1,200; Referee: (Hungary) István Vad

26 November 2011 17	Újpest FC	1–3	Győri ETO FC	Budapest, Pest County
17:30 CET (UTC+01)	Kabát 86'	(Report)	Trajković 39'; Dudás 57' (pen.); Ahjupera 80'	Stadium: Szusza Ferenc Stadium; Attendance: 2,000; Referee: (Hungary) Zoltán Iványi

3 March 2012 18	Újpest FC	1–1	BFC Siófok	Budapest, Pest County
16:00 CET (UTC+01)	Kabát 34'	(Report)	Simon 72'	Stadium: Szusza Ferenc Stadium; Attendance: 5,234; Referee: (Hungary) Balázs Böcskei

10 March 2012 19	Paksi SE	2–0	Újpest FC	Paks, Tolna County
16:00 CET (UTC+01)	Hrepka 4' 26'	(Report)		Stadium: Stadion PSE; Attendance: 3,468; Referee: (Hungary) Ádám Radványi

16 March 2012 20	Újpest FC	3–1	Kaposvári Rákóczi FC	Budapest, Pest County
18:00 CET (UTC+01)	Remili 20'; Kabát 54' 85'	(Report)	Grumić 52'	Stadium: Szusza Ferenc Stadium; Attendance: 2,500; Referee: (Hungary) Dániel Becséri

24 March 2012 21	Diósgyőri VTK	1–0	Újpest FC	Miskolc, Borsod-Abaúj-Zemplén County
17:30 CET (UTC+01)	Fernando 76'	(Report)		Stadium: DVTK Stadion; Attendance: 9,000; Referee: (Hungary) Péter Solymosi

1 April 2012 22	Újpest FC	1–5	Debreceni VSC	Budapest, Pest County
16:00 CET (UTC+01)	Kabát 83' (pen.)	(Report)	Szakály 8'; Bódi 21' 73'; Coulibaly 39' 59'	Stadium: Szusza Ferenc Stadium; Attendance: 4,000; Referee: (Hungary) Zsolt Szabó

7 April 2012 23	Pécsi Mecsek FC	0–0	Újpest FC	Pécs, Baranya County
18:00 CET (UTC+01)		(Report)		Stadium: Stadion PMFC; Attendance: 2,500; Referee: (Hungary) István Vad

15 April 2012 24	Újpest FC	2–0	Budapest Honvéd FC	Budapest, Pest County
18:00 CET (UTC+01)	Vasiljević 5'; Rajczi 79'	(Report)		Stadium: Szusza Ferenc Stadium; Attendance: 4,000; Referee: (Hungary) Viktor Kassai

21 April 2012 25	Szombathelyi Haladás	1–1	Újpest FC	Szombathely, Vas County
18:00 CET (UTC+01)	Kenesei 13'	(Report)	Balogh 80'	Stadium: Rohonci Street Stadium; Attendance: 6,000; Referee: (Hungary) Szabolcs Szilasi

28 April 2012 26	Újpest FC	2–0	Vasas SC	Budapest, Pest County
15:00 CET (UTC+01)	Vasiljević 48' (pen.); Lipták 65'	(Report)		Stadium: Szusza Ferenc Stadium; Attendance: 3,584; Referee: (Hungary) Péter Solymosi

5 May 2012 27	Zalaegerszegi TE	1–1	Újpest FC	Zalaegerszeg, Zala County
17:00 CET (UTC+01)	Máté 46'	(Report)	Vasiljević 75' (pen.)	Stadium: ZTE Arena; Attendance: 2,235; Referee: (Hungary) Sándor Andó-Szabó

12 May 2012 28	Újpest FC	1–1	Ferencvárosi TC	Budapest, Pest County
15:00 CET (UTC+01)	Vasiljević 82' (pen.)	(Report)	Grúz 22'	Stadium: Szusza Ferenc Stadium; Attendance: 10,000; Referee: (Hungary) Viktor Kassai

18 May 2012 29	Kecskeméti TE	0–0	Újpest FC	Kecskemét, Bács-Kiskun County
18:00 CET (UTC+01)		(Report)		Stadium: Széktói Stadion; Attendance: 3,500; Referee: (Hungary) István Vad

27 May 2012 30	Újpest FC	0–2	Videoton FC	Budapest, Pest County
15:30 CET (UTC+01)		(Report)	Perić 88' 89'	Stadium: Szusza Ferenc Stadium; Attendance: 2,837; Referee: (Hungary) Tamás Bognár

=== Classification ===
Pos	Team	Pld	W	D	L	GF	GA	GD	Pts	Qualification or relegation
11	Ferencváros	30	9	7	14	32	35	−3	34	
12	Pécs	30	8	10	12	36	50	−14	34	
13	Újpest	30	8	8	14	34	46	−12	32	
14	Pápa	30	8	6	16	26	40	−14	30	
15	Vasas (Note: Vasas were deducted 2 points due unauthorized play of Haris Mehmedagić.) (R)	30	5	9	16	29	51	−22	22	Relegation to Nemzeti Bajnokság II

Source: MLSZ (in Hungarian)
Rules for classification: 1st points; 2nd overall wins; 3rd goal difference; 4th goals scored
(R) Relegated

=== Results summary ===
Overall								Home						Away					
Pld	W	D	L	GF	GA	GD	Pts	W	D	L	GF	GA	GD	W	D	L	GF	GA	GD
30	8	8	14	34	46	−12	32	7	3	5	27	22	+5	1	5	9	7	24	−17

Last updated: 27 May 2012.
Source: NB1

=== Results by round ===
Round	1	2	3	4	5	6	7	8	9	10	11	12	13	14	15	16	17	18	19	20	21	22	23	24	25	26	27	28	29	30
Ground	H	A	A	H	A	H	A	H	A	H	A	H	A	H	A	A	H	H	A	H	A	H	A	H	A	H	A	H	A	H
Result	L	L	L	L	D	D	L	W	L	W	L	W	L	W	L	W	L	D	L	W	L	L	D	W	D	W	D	D	D	L
Position	13	13	14	15	14	14	15	14	14	12	14	13	14	13	13	9	10	11	13	11	12	12	12	12	12	12	11	12	12	13

Updated to match(es) played on 27 May 2012. Source: Matches
A = Away; H = Home; W = Win; D = Draw; L = Loss

== Hungarian Cup ==
21 September 2011 3	Dunakanyar-Vác FC	1–4	Újpest FC	Vác, Pest County
18:00	Papp 85'	(Report)	Balogh 58'; Simon 70'; Barczi 82'; Magos 90'	Stadium: Stadion Városi Vác; Attendance: 800; Referee: (Hungary) Gergely Szőts

2 October 2011 4	Szigetszentmiklósi TK	3–3 (a.e.t.) (3–4 p)	Újpest FC	Szigetszentmiklós, Pest County
14:00	Bonifert 8'; Somorjai 47' (pen.); Fekete 81'	(Report)	Mihajlović 71'; Barczi 74'; Marković 85'	Stadium: Városi Sporttelep; Attendance: 500; Referee: (Chile) Alvaro Miquel Garcia

=== Round of 16 ===
30 November 2011 1st leg	Kaposvári Rákóczi FC II	2–1	Újpest FC	Kaposvár, Somogy County
13:00	Haruna 79' 89'	(Report)	Kabát 35'	Stadium: Stadion Kaposvár Rákóczi; Attendance: 800; Referee: (Hungary) Balázs Berke

3 December 2011 2nd leg	Újpest FC	2–0 (3–2 agg.)	Kaposvári Rákóczi FC II	Budapest, Pest County
16:00	Remili 4'; Rajczi 56' (pen.)	(Report)		Stadium: Szusza Ferenc Stadium; Attendance: 1,300; Referee: (Hungary) Ádám Farkas

=== Quarter-final ===
25 February 2012 1st leg	Bajai LSE	1–3	Újpest FC	Baja, Bács-Kiskun County
14:00	Kormos 76' (pen.)	(Report)	Remili 58'; Kabát 64' 69'	Stadium: Vasvári Pál utcai Stadion; Attendance: 2,500; Referee: (Hungary) Szabolcs Szilasi

13 March 2012 2nd leg	Újpest FC	4–0 (7–1 agg.)	Bajai LSE	Budapest, Pest County
16:00	Remili 3' 53'; Pollák 20'; Proesmans 37'	(Report)		Stadium: Szusza Ferenc Stadium; Attendance: 1,812; Referee: (Hungary) L. Varga

=== Semi-final ===
21 March 2012 1st leg	Debreceni VSC	2–1	Újpest FC	Debrecen, Hajdú-Bihar County
19:15	Méyé 4'; Lucas 48'	(Report)	Kabát 38'	Stadium: Stadion Oláh Gábor Út; Attendance: 3,500; Referee: (Hungary) Ádám Farkas

11 April 2012 2nd leg	Újpest FC	1–3 (2–5 agg.)	Debreceni VSC	Budapest, Pest County
18:00	Kabát 55'	(Report)	Bódi 58' 84'; Szakály 90+1'	Stadium: Szusza Ferenc Stadium; Attendance: 3,327; Referee: (Hungary) Tamás Bognár

== League Cup ==
=== Matches ===
31 August 2011 1	Újpest FC	3–3	Paksi SE	Budapest, Pest County
18:00	Balogh 9'; Barczi 22' 40'	(Report)	Gévay 8'; Hrepka 68'; Montvai 82'	Stadium: Szusza Ferenc Stadium; Attendance: 300; Referee: (Hungary) Béla Botló

7 September 2011 2	Kecskeméti TE	4–3	Újpest FC	Kecskemét, Bács-Kiskun County
18:00	Lencse 2'; Savić 59'; Simon 74' 90+2'	(Report)	Bognár 19' (pen.); Üveges 35'; Szabó 55' (pen.)	Stadium: Széktói Stadion; Attendance: 800; Referee: (Hungary) Ferenc Karakó

5 October 2011 3	Újpest FC	1–0	Szolnoki MÁV FC	Budapest, Pest County
18:00	Rajczi 87'	(Report)		Stadium: Szusza Ferenc Stadium; Attendance: 200; Referee: (Hungary) István Mészáros

12 October 2011 4	Szolnoki MÁV FC	1–3	Újpest FC	Szolnok, Jász-Nagykun-Szolnok County
15:00	Kalmár 90'	(Report)	Barczi 21'; Takács 54' (pen.); Simon 89'	Stadium: Tiszaligeti Stadion; Attendance: 100; Referee: (Hungary) Ádám Farkas

9 November 2011 5	Újpest FC	4–2	Kecskeméti TE	Budapest, Pest County
17:00	Rajczi 15' 49'; Remili 74'; Lázár 85' (pen.)	(Report)	Litsingi 19' 43'	Stadium: Szusza Ferenc Stadium; Attendance: 800; Referee: (Hungary) János Takács

16 November 2011 6	Paksi SE	5–3	Újpest FC	Paks, Tolna County
13:00	Gévay 18'; Hrepka 45'; Magasföldi 52' 75'; Vayer 77'	(Report)	Balogh 8'; Wilson 51'; Marković 66'	Stadium: Stadion PSE; Attendance: 150; Referee: (Hungary) Dániel Becséri

==== Classification ====
Pos	Team	Pld	W	D	L	GF	GA	GD	Pts	Qualification
1	Kecskemét	6	4	1	1	13	10	+3	13	Advance to knockout phase
2	Paks	6	3	1	2	24	11	+13	10	Advance to knockout phase
3	Újpest	6	3	1	2	17	15	+2	10	
4	Szolnok	6	0	1	5	3	18	−15	1	

Rules for classification: 1) points; 2) goal difference; 3) number of goals scored.

== Pre Season (Winter) ==
20 January 2012	Újpest FC	5–0	Budafoki LC	Telki, Pest County
	Kabát; Marković; Rajczi; Kovács	(Report)

22 January 2012	Újpest FC	8–0	Tura VSK	Telki, Pest County
	Jevtić 9' 32'; Rajczi 26' 28'; Lipták 35'; Marković 67' 68'; Barczi 82'	(Report)		Referee: (Hungary) T. Farkas

28 January 2012	Újpest FC	1–1	Gyirmót SE	Telki, Pest County
	Barczi 69'	(Report)	Cseri 52'

31 January 2012	Vasas SC	1–0	Újpest FC	Budapest, Pest County
	Mihajlović 7' (o.g.)	(Report)		Stadium: Stadion Rudolf Illovszky; Attendance: 400; Referee: (Hungary) Kömpf

7 February 2012	(Slovakia) MFK Košice	0–1	Újpest FC	Belek, Antalya Province
		(Report)	Lázár 10'	Attendance: 200

10 February 2012	(Romania) FC Brașov	3–2	Újpest FC	Belek, Antalya Province
	Ilijoski 21' da Silva 61'; Enceanu 90'	(Report)	Barczi 7'; Jevtić 86' (pen.)	Attendance: 100

13 February 2012	(Ukraine) FC Volyn Lutsk	2–1	Újpest FC	Belek, Antalya Province
		(Report)	Remili 42' (pen.)

16 February 2012	(Romania) FC Rapid București	2–1	Újpest FC	Belek, Antalya Province
	Grigorie pen.' Roman	(Report)	Zamostny

19 February 2012	Újpest FC	0–1	MFK Banská Bystrica (Slovakia)	Budapest, Pest County
		(Report)	Hlinka	Stadium: Stadion Rudolf Illovszky; Attendance: 500; Referee: (Hungary) Balázs Berke
