= 2009–10 Újpest FC season =

Újpest
2009–10 season
- Manager: Lázár Szentes (until 31 May 2009); Willie McStay (from 6 July until 4 April 2010); Géza Mészöly (from 5 April)
- Stadium: Szusza Ferenc Stadion (Home stadium); Illovszky Rudolf Stadion (Note: The match against Paks in the Ligakupa were played at the Illovszky Rudolf Stadion in Budapest, instead of Újpest regular stadium, the Szusza Ferenc Stadion.) (Temporary stadium)
- Nemzeti Bajnokság I: 4th
- Magyar Kupa: Semi-finals
- Ligakupa: Second group stage
- UEFA Europa League: Second qualifying round
- Highest home attendance: 11,763 v Ferencváros (3 October 2009, Nemzeti Bajnokság I)
- Lowest home attendance: 200 v Haladás (9 March 2010, Ligakupa)
- Average home league attendance: 4,603
- Biggest win: 4–0 v MTK II (Away, 30 September 2009, Magyar Kupa); 6–2 v Kecskemét (Home, 27 October 2009, Magyar Kupa)
- Biggest defeat: 0–3 v Pápa (Home, 16 August 2009, Nemzeti Bajnokság I); 0–3 v Győr (Home, 27 February 2010, Nemzeti Bajnokság I)

The 2009–10 season was Újpest Football Club's 105th competitive season, 99th consecutive season in the Nemzeti Bajnokság I and 110th season in existence as a football club. In addition to the domestic league, Újpest participated in that season's editions of the Magyar Kupa, the Ligakupa and the UEFA Europa League.

== Squad ==
Squad at end of season

Note: Flags indicate national team as defined under FIFA eligibility rules; some limited exceptions apply. Players may hold more than one non-FIFA nationality.

No.	Pos.	Nation	Player
1	GK	HUN	Szabolcs Balajcza
2	DF	SRB	Ivan Dudić
4	DF	HUN	Zoltán Takács
5	MF	SRB	Dušan Vasiljević
6	MF	ENG	Tony Stokes
7	MF	HUN	Krisztián Simon
8	FW	HUN	Péter Rajczi
11	MF	HUN	Péter Simek
13	DF	HUN	Péter Varga
14	FW	HUN	Roland Varga
15	DF	HUN	Zoltán Kiss
16	FW	HUN	Gábor Demjén
17	MF	HUN	Norbert Tóth
18	DF	HUN	Krisztián Vermes
19	DF	HUN	Tamás Vaskó
20	MF	CTA	Foxi Kéthévoama
21	MF	HUN	Zsolt Korcsmár

No.	Pos.	Nation	Player
22	FW	HUN	Péter Kabát
23	GK	HUN	Gábor Horváth
24	DF	HUN	Zoltán Pollák
25	DF	HUN	Gábor Dvorschák
26	DF	HUN	Zsolt Szokol
27	MF	HUN	Dániel Kovács
29	FW	HUN	Richárd Frank
30	MF	HUN	Mátyás Magos
31	FW	HUN	Dávid Barczi
32	MF	HUN	László Gyürü
33	FW	HUN	Bence Lázár
34	DF	HUN	Ádám Privigyei
35	MF	HUN	Bertold Popovics
36	GK	HUN	Tamás Horváth
37	MF	HUN	Wilson Electo
42	FW	HUN	Attila Széki

== Competitions ==
=== Overview ===
Competition	First match	Last match	Starting round	Final position	Record							
Competition	First match	Last match	Starting round	Final position	Pld	W	D	L	GF	GA	GD	Win %
Nemzeti Bajnokság I	26 July 2009	23 May 2010	Matchday 1	4th	30	17	4	9	49	39	+10	56.67
Magyar Kupa	30 September 2009	14 April 2010	Round of 32	Semi-finals	7	5	1	1	17	5	+12	71.43
Ligakupa	13 February 2010	20 April 2010	Second group stage	Second group stage	6	1	3	2	6	6	+0	16.67
UEFA Europa League	16 July 2009	23 July 2009	Second qualifying round	Second qualifying round	2	0	0	2	1	4	−3	0.00
Total					45	23	8	14	73	54	+19	51.11

Source: Competitions

=== Nemzeti Bajnokság I ===
==== League table ====
Pos	Team	Pld	W	D	L	GF	GA	GD	Pts	Qualification or relegation
2	Videoton	30	18	7	5	59	31	+28	61	Qualification for Europa League second qualifying round
3	Győr	30	15	12	3	38	18	+20	57	Qualification for Europa League first qualifying round
4	Újpest	30	17	4	9	49	39	+10	55	
5	Zalaegerszeg	30	15	8	7	59	45	+14	53	Qualification for Europa League first qualifying round (Note: Since the winners of the 2009–10 Magyar Kupa, Debrecen, qualified for the Champions League, the spot given to the Magyar Kupa winners (Europa League first qualifying round) was passed to the losing finalists.)
6	MTK	30	12	7	11	52	41	+11	43	

Source: soccerway.com
Rules for classification: 1st points; 2nd overall wins; 3rd goal difference; 4th goals scored

==== Results summary ====
Overall								Home						Away					
Pld	W	D	L	GF	GA	GD	Pts	W	D	L	GF	GA	GD	W	D	L	GF	GA	GD
30	17	4	9	49	39	+10	55	11	0	4	28	20	+8	6	4	5	21	19	+2

Source: Hungarian Football Federation

==== Results by round ====
Round	1	2	3	4	5	6	7	8	9	10	11	12	13	14	15	16	17	18	19	20	21	22	23	24	25	26	27	28	29	30
Ground	A	H	A	H	A	H	A	H	A	H	A	H	A	H	A	H	A	H	A	H	A	H	A	H	A	H	A	H	A	H
Result	D	W	W	L	D	W	W	W	L	W	L	W	W	L	W	L	L	W	L	L	L	W	D	W	W	W	W	W	D	W
Position	10	4	3	7	5	4	3	4	4	4	4	3	3	3	3	4	5	4	5	5	6	5	6	5	5	5	4	4	4	4
Points	1	4	7	7	8	11	14	17	17	20	20	23	26	26	29	29	29	32	32	32	32	35	36	39	42	45	48	51	52	55

Source: Matches
A = Away; H = Home; W = Win; D = Draw; L = Loss

==== Matches ====
26 July 2009 1	Győr	0–0	Újpest	Győr
17:30 CEST (UTC+2)	O. Szabó (yellow card) 40'; Đorđević (yellow card) 88'	Report	Rajczi (yellow card) 12'; Sándor (yellow card) 60'	Stadium: ETO Park; Attendance: 4,200; Referee: Tamás Arany; Assistant referees: László Viszokai, Balázs Huszár; Fourth official: J. Zoltán Kovács

2 August 2009 2	Újpest	3–1	Kecskemét	Budapest
17:30 CEST (UTC+2)	Kabát 22'; Tisza 36'; A. Simon I 89'	Report	Koszó (yellow card) 33'; Koller (yellow card) 46'; Mbengono 90'	Stadium: Szusza Ferenc Stadion; Attendance: 0 Referee: Szabolcs Szilasi; Assistant referees: Vencel Tóth II, Gábor Takács; Fourth official: Dávid Ákos

9 August 2009 3	Diósgyőr	1–2	Újpest	Miskolc
17:30 CEST (UTC+2)	Kállai (yellow card) 22'; Lippai (penalty missed) 25', (yellow card) 90+3'; Balajti 29', (yellow card) 88'; G. Horváth I (yellow card) 32'; B. Lakatos (yellow card) 90'	Report	Miličić 34' (o.g.); Kabát (yellow card) 34'; Tisza 67'; Kéthévoama (yellow card) 90+2'	Stadium: Diósgyőri Stadion; Attendance: 6,000; Referee: Zoltán Iványi; Assistant referees: Zsolt Szpisják, János Medovarszki; Fourth official: Csaba Sándor

16 August 2009 4	Újpest	0–3	Pápa	Budapest
17:30 CEST (UTC+2)	Stokes (yellow card) 58'; Vaskó (yellow card) 63'; Kabát (yellow card) 77'	Report	G. Varga (yellow card) 21'; G. Tóth (yellow card) 36'; Bali 45'; S. Nagy (yellow card) 49'; Dlusztus (yellow card) 51'; A. Farkas 64' (pen.), (yellow card) 77'; Rebryk 72'	Stadium: Szusza Ferenc Stadion; Attendance: 3,200; Referee: Roland Veizer; Assistant referees: Péter Berettyán, Róbert Horváth; Fourth official: József Erdős

23 August 2009 5	Honvéd	1–1	Újpest	Budapest
17:30 CEST (UTC+2)	Debreceni (yellow card) 34'; Hajdú (yellow card) 63'; Hrepka 82'	Report	Kéthévoama 30'; Pollák (yellow card) 40'; Vermes (yellow card) 73'	Stadium: Bozsik József Stadion; Attendance: 2,500; Referee: Tamás Arany; Assistant referees: Gábor Erős, László Viszokai; Fourth official: J. Zoltán Kovács

30 August 2009 6	Újpest	3–1	Haladás	Budapest
17:30 CEST (UTC+2)	Kabát 73', (yellow card) 90+1'; Kéthévoama 81'; N. Tóth (yellow card) 88'; Sándor 89', (red card) 90'; Korcsmár (yellow card) 90+2'	Report	Rajos 28'; P. Tóth (yellow card) 50'; G. Nagy (yellow card) 71'; Irhás (yellow card) 83'	Stadium: Szusza Ferenc Stadion; Attendance: 3,078; Referee: Zsolt Szabó; Assistant referees: Róbert Kispál, György Ring; Fourth official: Tibor Gyarmati II

12 September 2009 7	Zalaegerszeg	1–4	Újpest	Zalaegerszeg
15:00 CEST (UTC+2)	Magasföldi 20'; Kamber (yellow card) 50'; Pavićević (yellow card) 79'	Report	Balajcza (yellow card) 21'; N. Tóth (yellow card) 33'; Kabát 41', 61', 84'; Simek (yellow card) 52'; Kéthévoama 69'	Stadium: ZTE Arena; Attendance: 4,576; Referee: Ádám Németh; Assistant referees: Zsolt Butkai, Zoltán Kovács; Fourth official: Csaba Pintér

19 September 2009 8	Újpest	3–1	Nyíregyháza	Budapest
17:30 CEST (UTC+2)	Kabát 42', 55'; Z. Takács (yellow card) 67'; N. Tóth (yellow card) 69'; Rajczi 88'	Report	Ambrusz (yellow card) 17'; Goia 28', (red card) 55'	Stadium: Szusza Ferenc Stadion; Attendance: 4,315; Referee: Gergely Sulyok; Assistant referees: György Ring, Tibor Vígh; Fourth official: Gergő Janitz

27 September 2009 9	Paks	1–0	Újpest	Paks
17:30 CEST (UTC+2)	T. Kiss 62'	Report	Kabát (yellow card) 61'; N. Tóth (yellow card) 90+1'	Stadium: Fehérvári úti Stadion; Attendance: 3,500; Referee: Zsolt Szabó; Assistant referees: Róbert Kispál, Attila Forgács; Fourth official: Sándor Andó-Szabó

3 October 2009 10	Újpest	2–1	Ferencváros	Budapest
17:30 CEST (UTC+2)	N. Tóth (yellow card) 34'; Kabát 43'; Z. Takács (yellow card) 78'; Rajczi 88'	Report	Fitos 42'; Zo. Balog (yellow card) 45'; Alcántara (yellow card) 67'	Stadium: Szusza Ferenc Stadion; Attendance: 11,763; Referee: Viktor Kassai; Assistant referees: Gábor Erős, György Ring; Fourth official: Tamás Arany

17 October 2009 11	Kaposvár	2–0	Újpest	Kaposvár
15:00 CEST (UTC+2)	Grúz (yellow card) 20'; Stanić (yellow card) 35'; Nikolić 42', 90', (yellow card) 43'; Balázs (yellow card) 62'; Maróti (yellow card) 74'	Report	Vermes (yellow card) 35'; Kabát (yellow card) 72'	Stadium: Rákóczi Stadion; Attendance: 2,500; Referee: István Vad; Assistant referees: László Viszokai, Zoltán Kovács; Fourth official: Tibor Farkas

24 October 2009 12	Újpest	3–2	MTK	Budapest
15:00 CEST (UTC+2)	Rajczi 8'; Simek 56'; Z. Takács 63'; N. Tóth (yellow card) 64'	Report	Gosztonyi 12'; Vági 44', (yellow card) 74'; Zsidai (yellow card) 68'; Melczer (yellow card) 80'	Stadium: Szusza Ferenc Stadion; Attendance: 3,217; Referee: Tamás Arany; Assistant referees: György Ring, Attila Kelemen; Fourth official: Gergő Király

30 October 2009 13	Debrecen	1–2	Újpest	Debrecen
19:00 CET (UTC+1)	Rudolf 17' (pen.), (penalty missed) 26', (yellow card) 58'; Pantić (yellow card) 38'; Komlósi (yellow card) 90'	Report	Z. Takács (yellow card) 16'; Pollák (yellow card) 26'; Rajczi (yellow card) 27'; Kabát 40' (pen.), 90+1' (pen.); Korcsmár (yellow card) 62'; Vermes (yellow card) 69'	Stadium: Oláh Gábor utcai Stadion; Attendance: 7,500; Referee: Sándor Andó-Szabó; Assistant referees: Vencel Tóth II, István Albert; Fourth official: Gábor Oláh

6 November 2009 14	Újpest	0–1	Videoton	Budapest
19:00 CET (UTC+1)	Kabát (yellow card) 41'; N. Tóth (yellow card) 71'	Report	D. Nagy 4'; Anđić (yellow card) 39'; B. Farkas (yellow card) 69'	Stadium: Szusza Ferenc Stadion; Attendance: 6,123; Referee: Zsolt Szabó; Assistant referees: Róbert Kispál, Tibor Vígh; Fourth official: Ádám Farkas

21 November 2009 15	Vasas	1–2	Újpest	Budapest
17:30 CET (UTC+1)	Dobrić (red card) 13'; Lázok 39' (pen.); Ba. B. Tóth (yellow card) 87'	Report	N. Tóth 25'; Vermes (yellow card) 38'; Pollák (red card) 45'; Rajczi 60', (yellow card) 63'; Simek (yellow card) 74'	Stadium: Illovszky Rudolf Stadion; Attendance: 4,000; Referee: Mihály Fábián; Assistant referees: György Ring, János Demeter; Fourth official: Róbert Nagy

27 February 2010 16	Újpest	0–3	Győr	Budapest
17:30 CET (UTC+1)	N. Tóth (yellow card) 14'; Dudić (yellow card) 65'	Report	Koltai 4', 79'; Aleksidze (yellow card) 64', (goal) 90'; Babić (yellow card) 81'; Nicorec (yellow card) 84'	Stadium: Szusza Ferenc Stadion; Attendance: 4,200; Referee: István Vad; Assistant referees: György Ring, Tibor Vígh; Fourth official: Gergő Király

6 March 2010 17	Kecskemét	2–1	Újpest	Kecskemét
17:30 CET (UTC+1)	Montvai 34'; A. Simon I 52' (pen.); Bagi (yellow card) 83'; Schindler (yellow card) 85'	Report	Vermes (yellow card) 41'; Dudić (yellow card) 51'; Millar 71'; Z. Takács (red card) 90+2'	Stadium: Széktói Stadion; Attendance: 2,000; Referee: Mihály Fábián; Assistant referees: Gyula Ortó, Tamás Márkus; Fourth official: Róbert Nagy

14 March 2010 18	Újpest	4–1	Diósgyőr	Budapest
17:30 CET (UTC+1)	Rajczi 8'; Vasiljević (yellow card) 43'; Kabát 64', 68'; R. Varga 80'	Report	Menougong 13'; Šupić (yellow card) 68'; Bognár (yellow card) 90+1'	Stadium: Szusza Ferenc Stadion; Attendance: 3,500; Referee: Tamás Bognár; Assistant referees: Balázs Huszár, Gábor Takács; Fourth official: Csaba Pintér

21 March 2010 19	Pápa	1–0	Újpest	Pápa
17:30 CET (UTC+1)	G. Tóth (yellow card) 28', (goal) 38'; G. Varga (yellow card) 62'; Szűcs (yellow card) 86'	Report	Ro. Varga (yellow card) 20'; Rajczi (red card) 63'; Kabát (yellow card) 71'; Vaskó (yellow card) 81'; Millar (yellow card) 83'; Vermes (yellow card) 87'	Stadium: Perutz Stadion; Attendance: 2,800; Referee: Viktor Kassai; Assistant referees: Balázs Farkas, János Demeter; Fourth official: József Erdős

27 March 2010 20	Újpest	0–1	Honvéd	Budapest
15:00 CET (UTC+1)	Millar (yellow card) 58'; Korcsmár (yellow card) 70'; Vaskó (yellow card) 90+2'	Report	Debreceni (yellow card) 14'; Diego 51'; Guié (yellow card) 53'; Z. Nagy (yellow card) 66'	Stadium: Szusza Ferenc Stadion; Attendance: 3,247; Referee: Roland Veizer; Assistant referees: Tibor Vámos, Zsolt Márton; Fourth official: Gergő Király

3 April 2010 21	Haladás	1–0	Újpest	Szombathely
15:00 CEST (UTC+2)	G. Nagy 46', (yellow card) 64'	Report	Pollák (red card) 32'; Kabát (yellow card) 49'	Stadium: Rohonci út Attendance: 5,000; Referee: Sándor Andó-Szabó; Assistant referees: György Ring, István Tóth; Fourth official: Gergő Janitz

9 April 2010 22	Újpest	2–1	Zalaegerszeg	Budapest
19:00 CEST (UTC+2)	Barczi 53'; Kabát 77'	Report	Pavićević 29', (yellow card) 29'; Illés (yellow card) 64'; Kamber (yellow card) 86'	Stadium: Szusza Ferenc Stadion; Attendance: 3,251; Referee: Zoltán Iványi; Assistant referees: Zsolt Szpisják, István Albert; Fourth official: Gábor Fajkusz

17 April 2010 23	Nyíregyháza	2–2	Újpest	Nyíregyháza
17:30 CEST (UTC+2)	Bošnjak 42'; Minczér (yellow card) 71'; Andorka 76'	Report	Vermes 14'; T. Horváth (red card) 39'; Rajczi (yellow card) 39'; Vaskó (yellow card) 40'; Kéthévoama 72'; Barczi (yellow card) 85'	Stadium: Városi Stadion; Attendance: 3,000; Referee: István Vad; Assistant referees: Vencel Tóth II, István Tóth; Fourth official: Ádám Farkas

24 April 2010 24	Újpest	3–2	Paks	Budapest
15:00 CEST (UTC+2)	Rajczi 13'; Barczi 18'; Korcsmár (yellow card) 32'; Kéthévoama (yellow card) 63'; Simek 84'	Report	Tököli 43', 80'; Sipeki (yellow card) 52'	Stadium: Szusza Ferenc Stadion; Attendance: 2,683; Referee: Álvaro García Miquel; Assistant referees: László Viszokai, Oszkár Lémon; Fourth official: Gergely Szőts

30 April 2010 25	Ferencváros	0–1	Újpest	Budapest
19:00 CEST (UTC+2)	Csizmadia (yellow card) 50'; Elding (yellow card) 74'; Ferenczi (yellow card) 89'	Report	Kabát 35'; Vasiljević (yellow card) 45'; Z. Takács (yellow card) 69'	Stadium: Stadion Albert Flórián; Attendance: 9,570; Referee: Viktor Kassai; Assistant referees: Gábor Erős, Zsolt Szpisják; Fourth official: Gábor Oláh

5 May 2010 26	Újpest	2–1	Kaposvár	Budapest
18:00 CEST (UTC+2)	Rajczi 12', 60'; Z. Takács (red card) 90'	Report	Zahorecz (yellow card) 48', (goal) 90+1' (pen.); Grúz (red card) 83'	Stadium: Szusza Ferenc Stadion; Attendance: 3,091; Referee: Tamás Bognár; Assistant referees: Gábor Takács, Tibor Vígh; Fourth official: Gábor Péter Kovács

9 May 2010 27	MTK	4–5	Újpest	Budapest
17:30 CEST (UTC+2)	Pál 24', 29', 64', 67'; Á. Szabó (red card) 53'	Report	Vaskó (yellow card) 50', (goal) 87'; Vasiljević 54' (pen.), 72', 74' (pen.); Korcsmár 69'; N. Tóth (yellow card) 83'	Stadium: Hidegkuti Nándor Stadion; Attendance: 2,500; Referee: József Berger; Assistant referees: Attila Forgács, János Medovarszki; Fourth official: Gábor Fajkusz

15 May 2010 28	Újpest	2–1	Debrecen	Budapest
17:30 CEST (UTC+2)	Vasiljević (yellow card) 53'; Korcsmár 60'; Kabát (red card) 63'; Barczi 83'	Report	Szélesi (yellow card) 37'; Komlósi (yellow card) 41'; Feczesin 70', (yellow card) 90'	Stadium: Szusza Ferenc Stadion; Attendance: 6,521; Referee: Zoltán Iványi; Assistant referees: Zsolt Szpisják, István Albert; Fourth official: Krisztián Pánczél

19 May 2010 29	Videoton	1–1	Újpest	Székesfehérvár
19:00 CEST (UTC+2)	Elek 3'; Sándor (yellow card) 52'; Lipták (yellow card) 72'	Report	Rajczi (yellow card) 33'; N. Tóth (yellow card) 63'; Vasiljević 73', (yellow card) 76'	Stadium: Sóstói Stadion; Attendance: 5,823; Referee: Zsolt Szabó; Assistant referees: Róbert Kispál, György Ring; Fourth official: Balázs Berke

23 May 2010 30	Újpest	1–0	Vasas	Budapest
17:30 CEST (UTC+2)	Korcsmár 8'; Vermes (yellow card) 58'; Balajcza (yellow card) 60'	Report	Gašpar (yellow card) 45'; Benounes (yellow card) 59'; M. Katona (yellow card) 71'	Stadium: Szusza Ferenc Stadion; Attendance: 6,257; Referee: Ádám Németh; Assistant referees: Balázs Farkas, Zsolt Butkai; Fourth official: Szabolcs Fenyvesi

=== Magyar Kupa ===
30 September 2009 Round of 32	MTK II	0–4	Újpest	Budapest
19:00 CEST (UTC+2)		Report	Rajczi 1' (pen.), 36'; A. Simon I 55', 81'	Stadium: Hidegkuti Nándor Stadion; Attendance: 400; Referee: Tamás Arany; Assistant referees: Gábor Takács, Zsolt Butkai

==== Round of 16 ====
20 October 2009 First leg	Kecskemét	2–5	Újpest	Kecskemét
17:30 CEST (UTC+2)	Koller (yellow card) 28'; I. Farkas (yellow card) 39'; Csordás 46'; Alempijević (red card) 48'; Mbengono 89'	Report	Rajczi 6', 57'; Sándor 42', (yellow card) 52'; Kabát 62'; Z. Takács (yellow card) 64'; D. Kovács 83'; A. Simon I (yellow card) 85'	Stadium: Széktói Stadion; Attendance: 500; Referee: Zoltán Iványi; Assistant referees: István Albert, Mátyás Viczián

27 October 2009 Second leg	Újpest	6–2 (11–4 agg.)	Kecskemét	Budapest
18:00 CET (UTC+1)	Vaskó 12'; Stokes 16'; A. Simon I 19', 39', 49'; Lambulić 77'; D. Kovács (yellow card) 79'	Report	Némedi 38' (pen.); Litsingi 65'; Bagi (red card) 86'	Stadium: Szusza Ferenc Stadion; Attendance: 550; Referee: Balázs Böcskei; Assistant referees: Balázs Farkas, István Tóth
Note: Újpest won 11–4 on aggregate.

==== Quarter-finals ====
17 November 2009 First leg	Videoton	0–1	Újpest	Székesfehérvár
18:00 CET (UTC+1)	Sebők (yellow card) 40'; Lipták (yellow card) 62'	Report	Z. Takács (yellow card) 24'; Kabát 43' (pen.); Simek (yellow card) 87'	Stadium: Sóstói Stadion; Attendance: 1,648; Referee: Péter Solymosi; Assistant referees: Oszkár Lémon, Gábor Takács

25 November 2009 Second leg	Újpest	1–0 (2–0 agg.)	Videoton	Budapest
18:00 CET (UTC+1)	Rajczi (yellow card) 68'; Sándor 74'; Dudić (yellow card) 82'; Vermes (yellow card) 85'	Report	G. Horváth II (red card) 40'; Lipták (yellow card) 63'; Ró. Varga (yellow card) 70'; Polonkai (yellow card) 72'	Stadium: Szusza Ferenc Stadion; Attendance: 1,976; Referee: Viktor Kassai; Assistant referees: Tibor Vámos, Róbert Kispál
Note: Újpest won 2–0 on aggregate.

==== Semi-finals ====
24 March 2010 First leg	Újpest	0–1	Zalaegerszeg	Budapest
18:00 CET (UTC+1)	Millar (yellow card) 51'; Vaskó (red card) 62'; Vasiljević (yellow card) 69'	Report	Kocsárdi (yellow card) 67'; Balázs 88'; Pavićević (yellow card) 90'	Stadium: Szusza Ferenc Stadion; Attendance: 2,696; Referee: István Vad; Assistant referees: György Ring, Zsolt Butkai; Fourth official: Gergely Szőts

14 April 2010 Second leg	Zalaegerszeg	0–0 (1–0 agg.)	Újpest	Zalaegerszeg
18:00 CEST (UTC+2)	Vlaszák (yellow card) 10'; Bogunović (yellow card) 70'; An. Horváth (yellow card) 88'; Balázs (yellow card) 89'	Report	N. Tóth (penalty missed) 10'; Kabát (yellow card) 13'; Simek (yellow card) 90+1'	Stadium: ZTE Arena; Attendance: 5,815; Referee: Péter Solymosi; Assistant referees: Gábor Erős, Róbert Kispál; Fourth official: Szabolcs Fenyvesi
Note: Zalaegerszeg won 1–0 on aggregate.

=== Ligakupa ===
==== Second group stage ====
Pos	Team	Pld	W	D	L	GF	GA	GD	Pts	Qualification	PAK	HAL	UTE	FER
1	Paks	6	3	3	0	9	6	+3	12	Advance to final	—	3–2	2–1	1–1
2	Haladás	6	1	3	2	9	9	0	6		0–0	—	2–2	4–1
3	Újpest	6	1	3	2	6	6	0	6		1–1	2–0	—	0–1
4	Ferencváros	6	1	3	2	5	8	−3	6		1–2	1–1	0–0	—

Source: Hungarian Football Federation

13 February 2010 1	Újpest	1–1	Paks	Budapest
13:30 CET (UTC+1)	Kéthévoama (yellow card) 55'; Millar (yellow card) 77'; Pollák (yellow card) 83'; Z. Takács 90+1'	Report	I. Nagy 43'; Vári (yellow card) 75'; Weitner (yellow card) 86'	Stadium: Illovszky Rudolf Stadion; Attendance: 500; Referee: Viktor Kassai; Assistant referees: Zsolt Butkai, Zsolt Márton

9 March 2010 3	Újpest	2–0	Haladás	Budapest
18:00 CET (UTC+1)	Martin 24'; Ro. Varga 74'	Report	A. Simon II (yellow card) 37'	Stadium: Szusza Ferenc Stadion; Attendance: 200; Referee: Ádám Németh; Assistant referees: Tibor Vígh, János Agócs

17 March 2010 4	Paks	2–1	Újpest	Paks
15:00 CET (UTC+1)	S. Horváth 16'; Tököli 29'; I. Mészáros (yellow card) 43'; J. Szabó (red card) 84'	Report	Martin 21', (red card) 88'; D. Kovács (yellow card) 67'; Popovics (yellow card) 77'; N. Tóth (yellow card) 81'	Stadium: Fehérvári úti Stadion; Attendance: 200; Referee: József Berger; Assistant referees: Attila Forgács, László Sebesyén

31 March 2010 5	Újpest	0–1	Ferencváros	Budapest
18:00 CEST (UTC+2)	Stokes (yellow card) 68'	Report	Wolfe (yellow card) 38'; Be. Tóth 55'; Sváb (yellow card) 87'; Csizmadia (yellow card) 90+3'	Stadium: Szusza Ferenc Stadion; Attendance: 1,942; Referee: Ádám Farkas; Assistant referees: Lajos L. Tóth, Péter Berettyán

6 April 2010 6	Haladás	2–2	Újpest	Szombathely
18:00 CEST (UTC+2)	Irhás 76'; Iszlai 86' (pen.); Z. Nagy II (yellow card) 87'	Report	Electo 71', (yellow card) 72'; Rajczi 81' (pen.); Privigyei (yellow card) 85'; Magos (yellow card) 88'	Stadium: Rohonci út Attendance: 200; Referee: Gábor Oláh; Assistant referees: Balázs Farkas, Balázs Kiss

20 April 2010 2	Ferencváros	0–0	Újpest	Budapest
19:00 CEST (UTC+2)		Report	Electo (yellow card) 33'; Z. Kiss II (yellow card) 77'	Stadium: Stadion Albert Flórián; Attendance: 500; Referee: János Takács; Assistant referees: Lajos L. Tóth, Gyula Ortó

=== UEFA Europa League ===
==== Qualifying rounds ====
===== Second qualifying round =====
16 July 2009 First leg	Steaua București (Romania)	2–0	(Hungary) Újpest	Bucharest, Romania
20:30 EEST (UTC+3)	Ochiroșii (yellow card) 35'; Kapetanos (red card) 42'; Surdu 46'; Goian (yellow card) 59'; Toja (yellow card) 62'; P. Marin (yellow card) 69'; Stancu 72'	Report	Kabát (yellow card) 23'; Korcsmár (yellow card) 34' (yellow-red card) 54'; Vaskó (yellow card) 43'; Pollák (yellow card) 44'	Stadium: Stadionul Steaua; Attendance: 19,003; Referee: Michael Koukoulakis (Greece); Assistant referees: Dimitrios Bozatzidis (Greece), Dimitrios Saraidaris (Greece); Fourth official: Georgios Daloukas (Greece)

23 July 2009 Second leg	Újpest (Hungary)	1–2 (1–4 agg.)	(Romania) Steaua București	Budapest, Hungary
19:45 CEST (UTC+2)	Tisza (yellow card) 22'; Dudić (yellow card) 30'; Vaskó 82'	Report	P. Marin (yellow card) 18'; Székely 58', (yellow card) 72'; Toja (yellow card) 63'; Grzelak 66'	Stadium: Szusza Ferenc Stadion; Attendance: 9,678; Referee: Andre Marriner (England); Assistant referees: David Richardson (England), Richard West (England); Fourth official: Anthony Taylor (England)
Note: Steaua București won 4–1 on aggregate.
