= Szabolcs Üveges =

Hungarian footballer

Personal information
- Full name: Szabolcs Üveges
- Date of birth: 29 April 1991 (age 35)
- Place of birth: Kalocsa, Hungary
- Height: 1.87 m (6 ft 1 1/2 in)
- Position: Midfielder

Team information
- Current team: Kisvárda
- Number: 11

Youth career
- 2003–2006: Miskolc
- 2006–2010: Újpest

Senior career*
Years	Team	Apps	(Gls)
2010–2011	Parma Primavera	8	(1)
2011–2012	Újpest	5	(0)
2012–2013	Putnok	10	(0)
2013–	Kisvárda	15	(1)
- * Club domestic league appearances and goals as of 1 March 2014

Szabolcs Üveges (born 29 April 1991) is a Hungarian midfielder who currently plays for Várda SE.
