= Yadin Zaris =

Israeli footballer

Yadin Zaris ידין זריס
Personal information
- Full name: Yadin Zaris
- Date of birth: 14 May 1990 (age 36)
- Place of birth: Herzliya, Israel
- Height: 1.90 m (6 ft 3 in)
- Position: Striker

Team information
- Current team: Hapoel Azor
- Number: 9

Senior career*
Years	Team	Apps	(Gls)
2007–2012	Maccabi Herzliya	76	(14)
2012–2014	Standard Liège	0	(0)
2012	→ Újpest (loan)	12	(2)
2013	→ Sint-Truidense (loan)	2	(0)
2013–2014	→ Maccabi Herzliya (loan)	19	(4)
2014–2015	Hakoah Amidar Ramat Gan	18	(1)
2015–2016	Hapoel Jerusalem	2	(0)
2016	Hapoel Hod HaSharon	9	(2)
2016–2017	Hapoel Azor	22	(4)
- * Club domestic league appearances and goals

Yadin Zaris (Hebrew: ידין זריס; born 14 May 1990) is an Israeli striker player who currently plays for Israeli side Hapoel Azor.
