= Ferenc Kalmár =

Hungarian physicist and politician

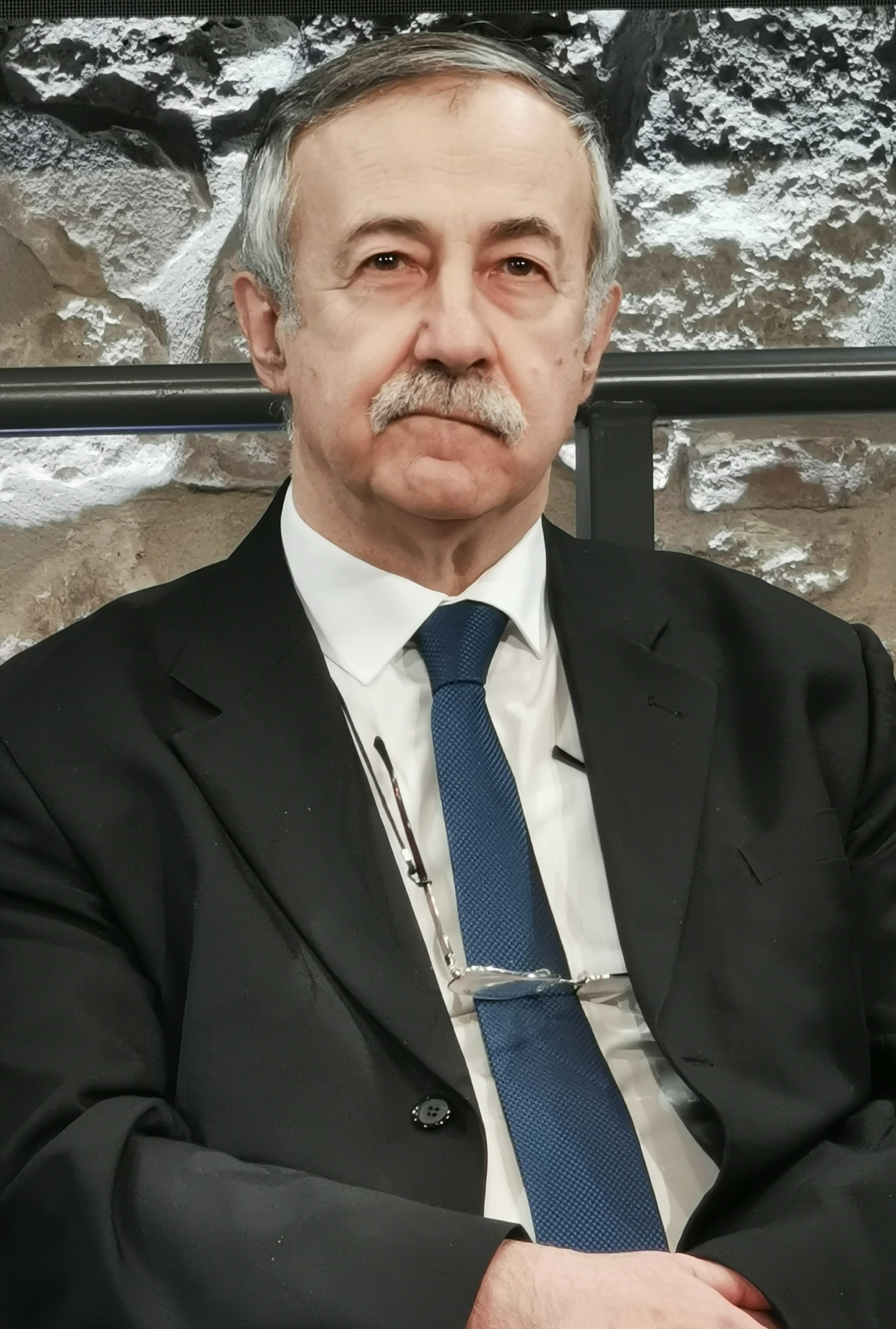
- Kalmár Ferenc in 2025

Member of the National Assembly
- In office 14 May 2010 – 5 May 2014

Personal details
- Born: 1955 (age 70–71) Brașov, Romania
- Party: KDNP (since 1991)
- Children: 2
- Profession: physicist, politician

Ferenc András Kalmár (born 1955) is a Hungarian physicist and politician, member of the National Assembly (MP) from Fidesz–KDNP Csongrád County Regional List between 2010 and 2014.

Kalmár was born in Brașov, Romania into an ethnic Hungarian family. He attended University of Bucharest, where he graduated in 1980. On 1 April 2015, he was appointed Ministerial Commissioner for Hungary's Neighbourhood Policy by Foreign Minister Péter Szijjártó.

== Personal life ==
He is married and has two children.
