= Richárd Horváth =

Hungarian footballer

Personal information
- Full name: Richárd Márk Horváth
- Date of birth: 11 May 1992 (age 34)
- Place of birth: Budapest, Hungary
- Height: 1.84 m (6 ft 1/2 in)
- Position: Striker

Team information
- Current team: Pápa
- Number: 77

Youth career
- 2002–2006: Újpest
- 2006–2007: Rákospalota
- 2007–2008: Vasas
- 2008–2012: Újpest

Senior career*
Years	Team	Apps	(Gls)
2012–2014	Újpest	3	(0)
2014–	Pápa	2	(0)
- * Club domestic league appearances and goals as of 1 June 2014

Richárd Horváth (born 11 May 1992, in Budapest) is a Hungarian striker player who currently plays for Újpest FC.

== Career statistics ==
Appearances and goals by club, season and competition
Club	Season	League			Cup		League Cup		Europe		Total	
Club	Season	Division	Apps	Goals	Apps	Goals	Apps	Goals	Apps	Goals	Apps	Goals
Újpest
Újpest	2011–12	Nemzeti Bajnokság I	0	0	2	0	1	0	0	0	3	0
Újpest	2012–13	Nemzeti Bajnokság I	1	0	0	0	2	2	0	0	3	2
Újpest	2013–14	Nemzeti Bajnokság I	2	0	0	0	5	1	0	0	7	1
Újpest	Total		3	0	2	0	8	3	0	0	13	3
Pápa	2013–14	Nemzeti Bajnokság I	2	0	2	0	3	0	0	0	7	0
Career total			5	0	4	0	11	3	0	0	20	3

Updated to games played as of 1 June 2014.
