= Ronald Erős =

Hungarian footballer

Personal information
- Full name: Ronald Erős
- Date of birth: 27 January 1993 (age 33)
- Place of birth: Cegléd, Hungary
- Height: 1.82 m (5 ft 11 1/2 in)
- Position: Defensive midfielder

Team information
- Current team: Cegléd
- Number: 4

Youth career
- 2005–2007: Monor
- 2007–2012: Újpest

Senior career*
Years	Team	Apps	(Gls)
2012–2014	Újpest	2	(0)
2014–	Cegléd	4	(0)
- * Club domestic league appearances and goals as of 1 June 2014

Ronald Erős (born 27 January 1993 in Cegléd) is a Hungarian football player. He plays for Ceglédi VSE in the Hungarian NB I. He played his first league match in 2013.

== Career statistics ==
Appearances and goals by club, season and competition
Club	Season	League			Cup		League Cup		Europe		Total	
Club	Season	Division	Apps	Goals	Apps	Goals	Apps	Goals	Apps	Goals	Apps	Goals
Újpest
Újpest	2011–12	Nemzeti Bajnokság I	0	0	1	0	0	0	0	0	1	0
Újpest	2012–13	Nemzeti Bajnokság I	2	0	0	0	6	0	0	0	8	0
Újpest	2013–14	Nemzeti Bajnokság I	0	0	1	0	2	0	0	0	3	0
Újpest	Total		2	0	2	0	8	0	0	0	12	0
Cegléd	2013–14	Nemzeti Bajnokság II	4	0	0	0	0	0	0	0	4	0
Career total			6	0	2	0	8	0	0	0	16	0

Updated to games played as of 1 June 2014.
