= Nikolas Proesmans =

Belgian footballer

Personal information
- Full name: Nikolas Proesmans
- Date of birth: 11 May 1992 (age 34)
- Place of birth: Tongeren, Belgium
- Height: 1.78 m (5 ft 10 in)
- Position: Midfielder

Team information
- Current team: Sangiustese VP

Youth career
- –2010: St. Truiden

Senior career*
Years	Team	Apps	(Gls)
2010–2012	St. Truiden	6	(1)
2012–2014	Újpest	25	(0)
2015	Ararat Yerevan	11	(0)
2016	Jesina	8	(0)
2016–2018	Sangiustese	32	(2)
2018	Ancona		
2018–2019	Montegiorgio	15	(0)
2019–2020	Sangiustese	16	(0)
2020–2021	Osimana		
2021	Atletico Ascoli		
2021–2022	Osimana		
2022–	Sangiustese VP		

International career
2009–2010	Belgium U18	6	(0)
2010	Belgium U19	1	(0)
- * Club domestic league appearances and goals as of 17:23, 10 November 2019 (UTC)

Nikolas Proesmans (born 11 May 1992 in Tongeren) is a Belgian midfielder who plays for Eccellenza side Sangiustese VP.

== Career statistics ==
=== Club ===
As of match played 23 May 2015

Appearances and goals by club, season and competition
Club	Season	League			National Cup		League Cup		Continental		Total	
Club	Season	Division	Apps	Goals	Apps	Goals	Apps	Goals	Apps	Goals	Apps	Goals
Sint-Truiden	2010–11	Jupiler Pro League	6	1	0	0	-		-		6	1
Sint-Truiden	2011–12	Jupiler Pro League	0	0	0	0	-		-		0	0
Sint-Truiden	Total		6	1	0	0	-	-	-	-	6	1
Újpest	2011–12	Nemzeti Bajnokság I	5	0	3	1	0	0	-		8	1
Újpest	2012–13	Nemzeti Bajnokság I	11	0	0	0	1	0	-		12	0
Újpest	2013–14	Nemzeti Bajnokság I	9	0	3	0	0	0	-		12	0
Újpest	Total		25	0	6	1	1	0	-	-	32	1
Ararat Yerevan	2014–15	Armenian Premier League	11	0	0	0	–		–		11	0
Career total			42	1	6	1	1	0	-	-	49	2

== Honours ==
Újpest

- Magyar Kupa: 2013–14
