= Nikon El Maestro =

Serbian-English footballer

Personal information
- Full name: Nikon El Maestro
- Birth name: Nikon Jevtić
- Date of birth: 3 June 1993 (age 33)
- Place of birth: Belgrade, FR Yugoslavia
- Height: 1.75 m (5 ft 9 in)
- Position: Attacking midfielder

Team information
- Current team: Anorthosis Famagusta (assistant)

Youth career
- 1998–2001: West Ham United
- 2002–2004: Austria Wien
- 2004–2006: Valencia
- 2006–2008: Schalke 04
- 2008–2011: Austria Wien

Senior career*
Years	Team	Apps	(Gls)
2011	Wiener Neustadt		
2012	Újpest FC	2	(0)
2012	Korona Kielce		
2013	Nyíregyháza Spartacus	4	(0)
2013	Sloga Petrovac		
2014	FK Blau-Weiß Hollabrunn	25	(14)
2015–2016	SV Mitterndorf	46	(27)
2016	FC Hellas Kagran	6	(2)

Managerial career
- 2014–2015: FC Hellas Kagran (youth)
- 2015–2017: 1. Simmeringer SC (youth)
- 2017–2018: Spartak Trnava (assistant)
- 2018–2019: CSKA Sofia (assistant)
- 2019–2020: Sturm Graz (assistant)
- 2021: Al-Taawoun (assistant)
- 2021–2022: Göztepe (assistant)
- 2023: Austria U19 (assistant)
- 2023–2024: CSKA Sofia (assistant)
- 2024–2025: Debrecen (assistant)
- * Club domestic league appearances and goals

Nikon El Maestro (born 3 June 1993 as Nikon Jevtić) is a Serbian-English former professional footballer who played as an attacking midfielder. In March 2014, he took over as head coach of FC Hellas Kagran U11, later taking over as the head coach of the U16 side.

== See also ==
- Nestor El Maestro
