= Bertold Popovics =

Hungarian footballer

Personal information
- Full name: Bertold Popovics
- Date of birth: 21 June 1991 (age 35)
- Place of birth: Szeged, Hungary
- Height: 1.80 m (5 ft 11 in)
- Position: Midfielder

Team information
- Current team: Balassagyarmati VSE
- Number: 22

Youth career
- 2003–2006: Tisza Volán SC
- 2006–2010: Újpest FC

Senior career*
Years	Team	Apps	(Gls)
2009–2012	Újpest	3	(0)
2010–2012	→ Újpest II	60	(8)
2013	Vasas	5	(0)
2014	Kisvárda	6	(0)
2014	Salgótarján	8	(0)
2016	Cegléd	18	(0)
2017–	Balassagyarmat	14	(0)
- * Club domestic league appearances and goals as of 25 November 2017

Bertold Popovics (born 21 June 1991) is a Hungarian midfielder who currently plays for Balassagyarmati VSE.

At age 20, Popovics signed a professional contract with Újpest in July 2011.
