= Bojan Mihajlović (footballer, born 1988) =

Bosnian-Herzegovinian footballer

Personal information
- Full name: Bojan Mihajlović
- Date of birth: 15 September 1988 (age 38)
- Place of birth: Foča, SFR Yugoslavia
- Height: 1.80 m (5 ft 11 in)
- Position: Centre back

Team information
- Current team: Sutjeska Foča
- Number: 18

Senior career*
Years	Team	Apps	(Gls)
2006–2010	Sutjeska Foča		
2010–2011	Drina Zvornik	27	(1)
2011–2015	Újpest	39	(1)
2015	Banants	14	(1)
2016	Isloch Minsk Raion	15	(0)
2017	Maziya S&RC		
2018	Sutjeska Foča	14	(1)
2018–2019	OFK Sloga	29	(3)
2019	Igman Konjic	13	(1)
2020	GOŠK Gabela	4	(0)
2020–2021	Goražde	23	(5)
2021–	Sutjeska Foča	81	(6)
- * Club domestic league appearances and goals as of 15 June 2024

Bojan Mihajlović (born 15 September 1988) is a Bosnian-Herzegovinian football defender who plays for Sutjeska Foča.
