= Tamás Rubus =

Hungarian footballer

Personal information
- Date of birth: 13 July 1989 (age 37)
- Place of birth: Békéscsaba, Hungary
- Height: 1.86 m (6 ft 1 in)
- Position: Defender

Team information
- Current team: Kisvárda II

Youth career
- 2005–2006: Békéscsaba

Senior career*
Years	Team	Apps	(Gls)
2006–2010	Békéscsaba	76	(2)
2010–2013	Újpest	14	(1)
2012	→ Vasas (loan)	3	(0)
2013–2019	Nyíregyháza	139	(6)
2019–2023	Kisvárda	38	(2)
2021–	Kisvárda II	55	(7)
- * Club domestic league appearances and goals as of 15 October 2023

Tamás Rubus (born 13 July 1989) is a Hungarian football player who plays for Kisvárda II.

== Career statistics ==
Appearances and goals by club, season and competition
Club	Season	League		Cup		League Cup		Europe		Total	
Club	Season	Apps	Goals	Apps	Goals	Apps	Goals	Apps	Goals	Apps	Goals
Békéscsaba
Békéscsaba	2007–08	27	1	0	0	–	–	–	–	27	1
Békéscsaba	2008–09	26	0	2	0	–	–	–	–	28	0
Békéscsaba	2009–10	23	1	1	0	–	–	–	–	24	1
Békéscsaba	Total	76	2	3	0	0	0	0	0	79	2
Újpest
Újpest	2010–11	10	1	1	0	2	0	–	–	13	1
Újpest	2011–12	4	0	1	0	3	0	–	–	8	0
Újpest	2012–13	0	0	0	0	3	0	–	–	3	0
Újpest	Total	14	1	2	0	8	0	0	0	24	1
Vasas
Vasas	2011–12	3	0	0	0	0	0	–	–	3	0
Vasas	Total	3	0	0	0	0	0	0	0	3	0
Nyíregyháza
Nyíregyháza	2013–14	25	1	7	0	0	0	–	–	32	1
Nyíregyháza	2014–15	17	0	1	0	10	2	–	–	28	2
Nyíregyháza	2015–16	29	1	6	0	–	–	–	–	35	1
Nyíregyháza	2016–17	35	2	1	0	–	–	–	–	36	2
Nyíregyháza	2017–18	19	2	0	0	–	–	–	–	19	2
Nyíregyháza	2018–19	14	0	2	0	–	–	–	–	16	0
Nyíregyháza	Total	139	6	17	0	10	2	0	0	166	8
Kisvárda
Kisvárda	2019–20	23	1	1	0	–	–	–	–	24	1
Kisvárda	2020–21	14	1	2	0	–	–	–	–	16	1
Kisvárda	Total	37	2	3	0	0	0	0	0	40	2
Career total		269	11	25	0	18	2	0	0	312	13

Updated to games played as of 15 May 2021.
