= Zoltán Takács (footballer) =

Hungarian footballer

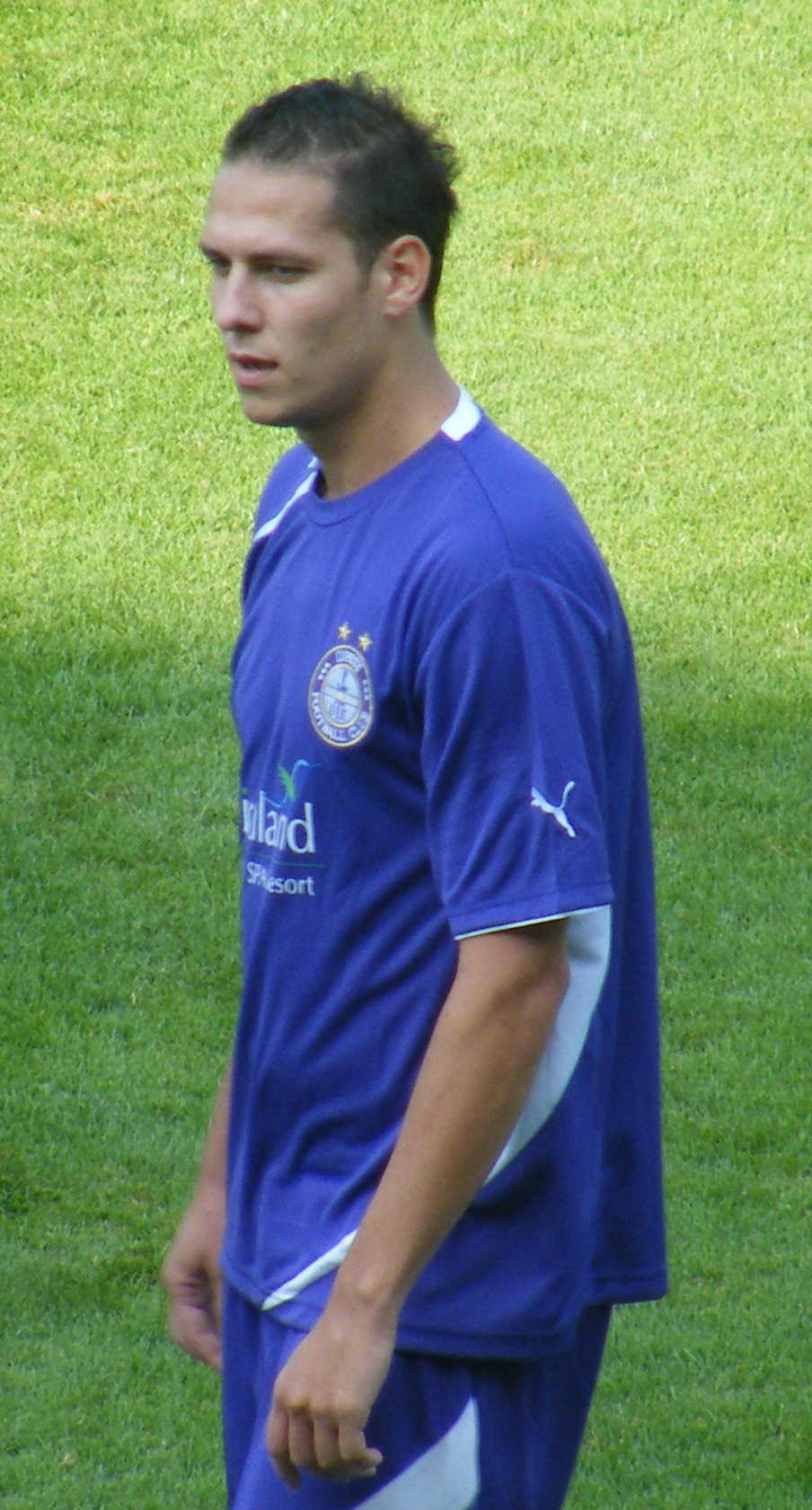

Personal information
- Full name: Zoltán Takács
- Date of birth: 26 November 1983 (age 42)
- Place of birth: Budapest, Hungary
- Height: 1.90 m (6 ft 3 in)
- Position: Left back

Team information
- Current team: Pátyi SE

Youth career
- 2002–2003: Budapest Honvéd

Senior career*
Years	Team	Apps	(Gls)
2002–2007	Budapest Honvéd	72	(6)
2007–2008	Debrecen	34	(2)
2009	SPAL 1907	16	(1)
2009–2013	Újpest	47	(2)
2012	→ Vasas (loan)	9	(1)
2013	Siófok	12	(1)
2013–2017	Gabčíkovo		
2017	Komárom	6	(0)
2017–2018	Vecsés	13	(1)
2018–2019	Felsőtárkány	2	(0)
2019–	Pátyi SE	17	(3)

International career
2005–2006	Hungary U-21	8	(0)
2005	Hungary	1	(0)
- * Club domestic league appearances and goals as of 20:12, 15 March 2020 (UTC)

Zoltán Takács (born 26 November 1983, in Budapest) is a Hungarian football player who currently plays for Pátyi SE.

== Club career ==
=== Budapest Honvéd ===
Takács spent the first four and a half years of his career at Budapest Honvéd FC where he played at the Hungarian top level, except in the 2003–04 season where Budapest Honvéd FC was playing in the NB II. In the first division of the Hungarian League, he played in 72 games and scored 5 goals.

In the 2003–04 season Budapest Honvéd FC, a second division club at the time, reached the final of the Hungarian Cup where they lost 3–1 to Ferencvárosi TC. Their performance lead Takács' club into the UEFA Cup 2004–05 where they were defeated by a penalty shoot-out against the Polish side of Amica Wronki in the second qualifying round of the tournament.

=== Debreceni VSC ===
In 2006, the Budapest Honvéd FC coach Aldo Dolcetti was replaced by Attila Supka. Upon his appointment Supka made cuts to the team and Takács moved to Debreceni VSC on a free transfer.

=== Újpest FC ===
Takács played for Italian side SPAL 1907 during the 2009 Spring season. On 4 July 2009 Újpest FC signed Takács.

=== Honours ===
- Hungarian League: 2007
- Hungarian Cup: 2008
