= Péter Rajczi =

Hungarian footballer

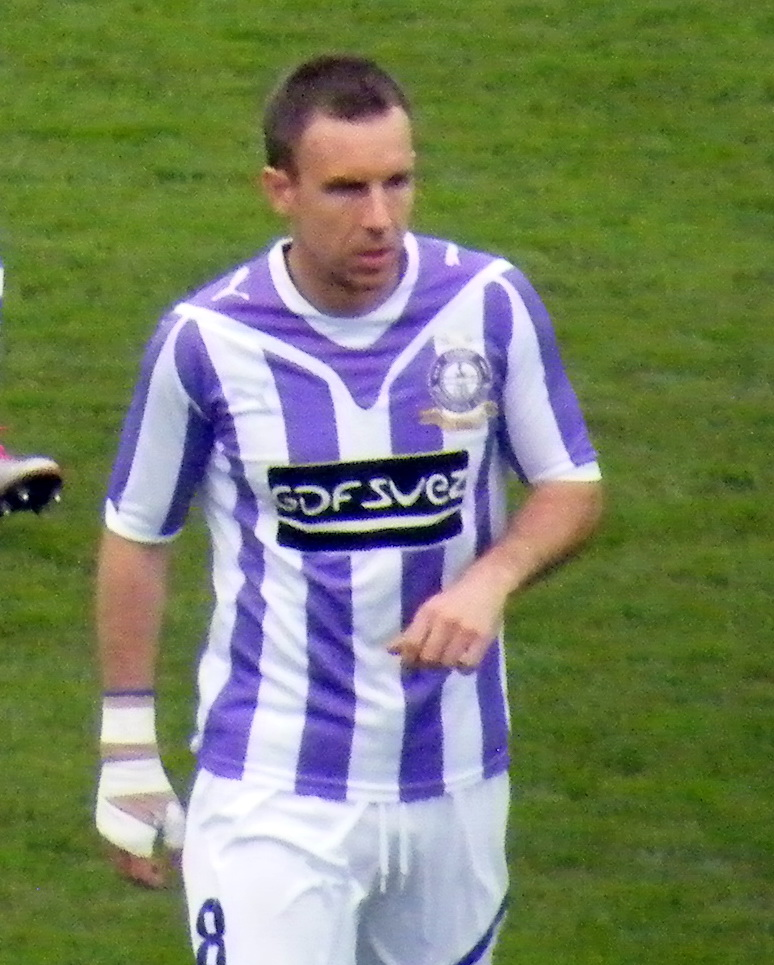

Personal information
- Full name: Péter Rajczi
- Date of birth: 3 April 1981 (age 45)
- Place of birth: Lengyeltóti, Hungary
- Height: 5 ft 10 in (1.78 m)
- Positions: Forward; winger

Team information
- Current team: USV Neulengbach
- Number: 11

Youth career
- 1995–1997: Kaposvár

Senior career*
Years	Team	Apps	(Gls)
1997–2003	Kaposvár	131	(55)
2003–2007	Újpest	92	(48)
2007	→ Barnsley (loan)	15	(1)
2007–2008	Pisa Calcio	12	(1)
2008–2013	Újpest	89	(33)
2013–2014	Kecskemét	22	(4)
2014	Mezőkövesd	7	(0)
2014–2015	Kaposvár	27	(11)
2015–2017	Kisvárda	56	(16)
2017–2019	Kaposvár	37	(15)
2019–2023	III. Kerület	37	(6)
2023–	USV Neulengbach	1	(1)

International career
2004–2007	Hungary	12	(3)
- * Club domestic league appearances and goals as of 20:11, 3 February 2022 (UTC)

Péter Rajczi (born 3 April 1981) is a Hungarian footballer who plays as a striker for USV Neulengbach.

== Career ==
Rajczi started to play football in Kaposvár, playing for Kaposvári Rákóczi FC. He played many seasons with Rákóczi, and scored a number of goals, reaching the topscorer title once in the second division. In 2003, he was signed by Újpest FC, where he became one of the most respected Hungarian strikers. Rajczi won two silver medals in the championship with Újpest.

Rajczi became the top scorer of the Hungarian league in the 2005–06 season by scoring 23 goals in 24 games.

He joined English Championship (second-tier) club Barnsley on 29 January 2007, for a substantial loan amount, and with an option to sign permanently in the summer. He made his debut as a substitute in Barnsley's game with Cardiff City on 2 February 2007. Rajczi scored his only Barnsley goal against Hull City on 20 February 2007.

At the end of the 2006–2007 season Rajczi returned from loan to Hungary and joined Újpest again. After a season spent at Pisa Calcio in the Italian Serie B, he returned to Újpest.

== International goals ==
#	Date	Venue	Opponent	Score	Result	Competition
1.	2 December 2004	Bangkok, Thailand	Estonia	5–0	Win	King's Cup 2004
2.	30 March 2005	Budapest, Hungary	Bulgaria	1–1	Draw	FIFA World Cup 2006 Qual.
3.	3 September 2005	Budapest, Hungary	Malta	4–0	Win	FIFA World Cup 2006 Qual.

== Honours ==
- Hungarian Top Goalscorer: 2006
- Player of the Year in Hungary: 2006
