= Bence Lázár =

Hungarian footballer

Personal information
- Full name: Bence Lázár
- Date of birth: 21 March 1991
- Place of birth: Kecskemét, Hungary
- Date of death: 22 February 2018 (aged 26)
- Height: 1.81 m (5 ft 11 1/2 in)
- Position: Center forward

Youth career
- 2003–2006: Lajosmizse
- 2006–2008: Újpest

Senior career*
Years	Team	Apps	(Gls)
2008–2014	Újpest	52	(13)
2010	→ Würmla (loan)	14	(1)
2010	→ Újpest II (loan)	14	(5)
2014	→ Nyíregyháza (loan)	5	(0)
Total		85	(19)

International career
2010	Hungary U-21	4	(1)
- * Club domestic league appearances and goals

Bence Lázár (21 March 1991 – 22 February 2018) was a Hungarian footballer (striker) who last played for Újpest FC. He retired from professional football in 2014 at the age of 23 after serious back problems. In 2015, he was diagnosed with leukemia.

Lázár died on 22 February 2018, aged 26.

== Club career ==
He made his debut against Kaposvári Rákóczi FC on 26 February 2011. In this match, he scored twice.

== Honours ==
Újpest

- Hungarian Cup (1): 2013–14
