= Péter Kabát =

Hungarian footballer

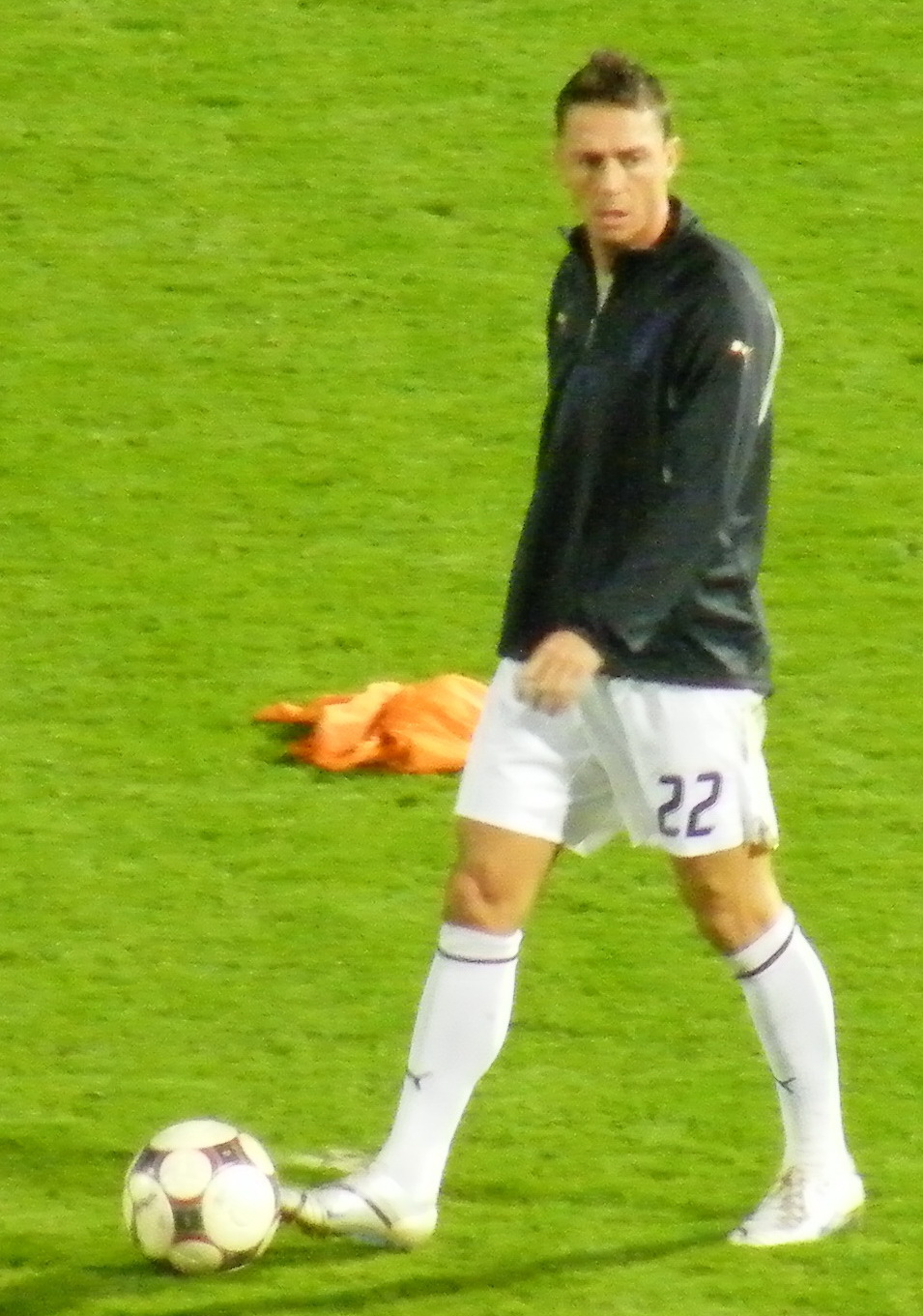

Personal information
- Date of birth: 25 September 1977 (age 49)
- Place of birth: Budapest, Hungary
- Height: 1.80 m (5 ft 11 in)
- Positions: Midfielder; striker

Senior career*
Years	Team	Apps	(Gls)
1994–1999	Honvéd	58	(7)
1999–2001	Vasas	61	(37)
2001	Göztepe Izmir	12	(2)
2002	Levski Sofia	15	(5)
2002–2003	Denizlispor	27	(2)
2003–2005	Kärnten	55	(19)
2005–2007	Pasching	36	(7)
2007–2008	Kärnten	11	(2)
2008–2010	Újpest	49	(30)
2010–2011	Debrecen	16	(4)
2011–2016	Újpest	88	(27)
2016–2017	ETO FC Győr	36	(12)

International career^{‡}
1996–1997	Hungary U-19	9	(1)
1998–2000	Hungary U-21	12	(2)
2000–2006	Hungary	16	(0)
- * Club domestic league appearances and goals as of 19 November 2017 ‡ National team caps and goals as of 19 September 2008

Péter Kabát (born 25 September 1977) is a Hungarian football player.

He can play as a striker or as an attacking midfielder. Kabát earned his first international cap on 15 November 2000 in a 1–0 win against Macedonia.

== Club career ==
He was the top scorer for Vasas Budapest in 2000/01. In 2002, he won the Bulgarian championship and cup with Levski Sofia. Kabát is the first foreign player to register three assists in the A PFG, a feat he achieved on 6 April 2002, in Levski Sofia's 3:1 win over Slavia Sofia. He also played at Göztepe in the Turkish league during the 2001–2002 season and for Austrian side Austria Kärnten.

On 16 December 2010, Kabát netted twice to help his team achieve a 2–0 win against Italian side UC Sampdoria. These were the first points earned by the team from Debrecen in the group stages of a UEFA tournament.

In June 2011, Kabát returned to his previous club, Újpest FC.

== Honours ==
=== Club ===
Levski Sofia

- A Group (1): 2001–02
- Bulgarian Cup (1): 2001–02

Újpest

- Hungarian Cup (1): 2013–14

=== Individual ===
- Hungarian League Top Goalscorer (1): 2001
