= Mátyás Magos =

Hungarian footballer

Personal information
- Full name: Mátyás Magos
- Date of birth: 14 March 1992 (age 34)
- Place of birth: Budapest, Hungary
- Height: 1.82 m (5 ft 11 1/2 in)
- Position: Midfielder

Team information
- Current team: Szolnok
- Number: 4

Youth career
- 2003–2006: Balassagyarmat
- 2006–2011: Újpest

Senior career*
Years	Team	Apps	(Gls)
2011–2013	Újpest	78	(11)
2013–2015	Szolnok	64	(3)
2015–2016	Vác	26	(7)
2016–	Balassagyarmat	40	(45)

International career^{‡}
2012–	Hungary U-20	1	(0)
- * Club domestic league appearances and goals as of 21 September 2017 ‡ National team caps and goals as of 28 April 2012

Mátyás Magos (born 14 March 1992) is a Hungarian football (midfielder) player who currently plays for Balassagyarmati VSE.

== Club career ==
He became a first squad member at Újpest FC in 2011.
