= Zoltán Kiss (footballer, born 1986) =

Hungarian footballer

Personal information
- Date of birth: 12 July 1986 (age 40)
- Place of birth: Kisterenye, Hungary
- Height: 1.83 m (6 ft 0 in)
- Position: Defender

Team information
- Current team: Siófok
- Number: 21

Youth career
- 1996–2000: Kisterenye
- 2000–2002: Vasas
- 2002–2003: Újpest

Senior career*
Years	Team	Apps	(Gls)
2003–2009	Újpest	28	(0)
2006	→ Sopron (loan)	3	(0)
2008	→ Szolnok (loan)	15	(3)
2009–2010	Nyíregyháza	12	(0)
2010–2012	Újpest	26	(0)
2012–2013	Békéscsaba	8	(0)
2013	Siófok	4	(0)
2013–2018	Saalfelden	113	(9)

International career
2003	Hungary U-17		
- * Club domestic league appearances and goals

Zoltán Kiss (born 12 July 1986) is a Hungarian former footballer who played as a defender.
