= Szabolcs Balajcza =

Hungarian football goalkeeper

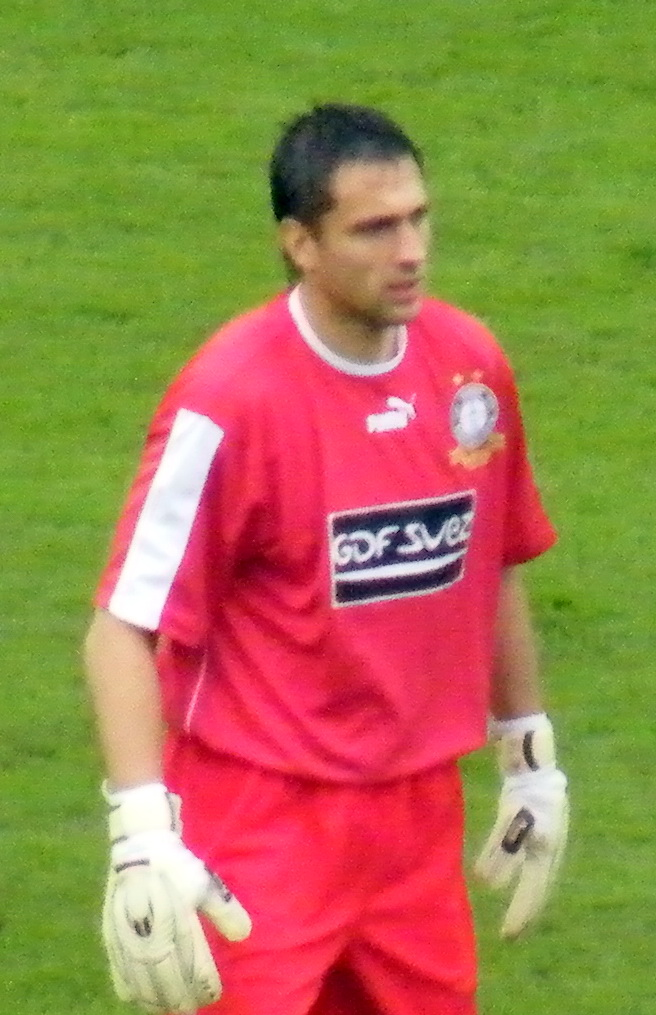
- Balajcza playing for Újpest in 2010

Personal information
- Date of birth: 14 July 1979 (age 47)
- Place of birth: Kaposvár, Hungary
- Height: 1.89 m (6 ft 2 in)
- Position: Goalkeeper

Team information
- Current team: Hetes Vikár
- Number: 1

Senior career*
Years	Team	Apps	(Gls)
1998–2006	Kaposvár	199	(0)
2006–2017	Újpest	301	(0)
2017–2018	Siófok	36	(0)
2018–2020	Hetes Vikár	48	(0)
- * Club domestic league appearances and goals as of 8 May 2021

Szabolcs Balajcza (born 14 July 1979 in Kaposvár) is a Hungarian football goalkeeper who currently plays for Hetes Vikár.

== Honours ==
Újpest

- Hungarian Cup (1): 2013–14
