= Dániel Kovács (footballer, born June 1990) =

Hungarian footballer

Personal information
- Full name: Dániel Kovács
- Date of birth: 16 June 1990 (age 36)
- Place of birth: Békéscsaba, Hungary
- Height: 1.84 m (6 ft 1/2 in)
- Position: Left midfielder

Team information
- Current team: Gyirmót
- Number: 11

Youth career
- 2002–2008: Békéscsaba

Senior career*
Years	Team	Apps	(Gls)
2008–2009	Békéscsaba	16	(3)
2009–2013	Újpest	28	(1)
2013–	Gyirmót	9	(0)

International career^{‡}
2009	Hungary U-19	5	(0)
2010–2012	Hungary U-21	1	(0)
- * Club domestic league appearances and goals as of 1 June 2014 ‡ National team caps and goals as of 29 September 2013

Dániel Kovács (born 16 June 1990 in Békéscsaba) is a Hungarian football player who currently plays for Újpest FC.
