= Tamás Horváth (footballer, born 1987) =

Hungarian footballer

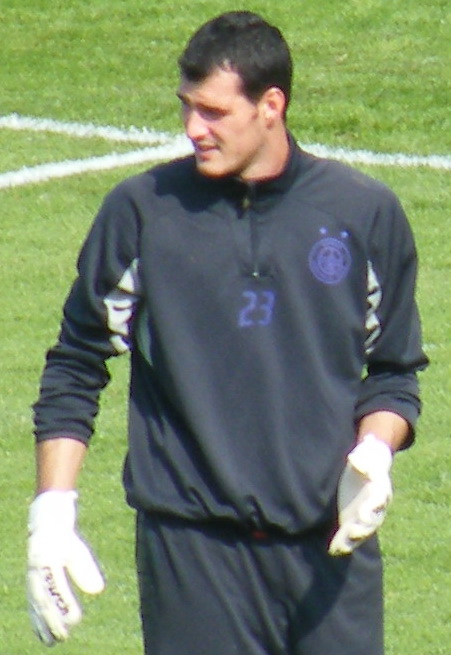
- Horváth in 2009

Personal information
- Date of birth: 18 June 1987 (age 39)
- Place of birth: Veszprém, Hungary
- Height: 1.90 m (6 ft 3 in)
- Position: Goalkeeper

Team information
- Current team: III. Kerület
- Number: 1

Youth career
- 2002–2004: Diósgyőr
- 2004–2005: Siófok
- 2005–2010: Újpest

Senior career*
Years	Team	Apps	(Gls)
2006–2013	Újpest	3	(0)
2008–2013	Újpest II	69	(0)
2006–2008	→ Százhalombatta (loan)	21	(0)
2013–2014	Mezőkövesd	4	(0)
2014–2018	Videoton	0	(0)
2015	→ Puskás Akadémia (loan)	1	(0)
2016	→ Mezőkövesd (loan)	2	(0)
2018–2020	Győr	59	(0)
2020–2021	Ajka	14	(0)
2021–	III. Kerület	5	(0)
- * Club domestic league appearances and goals as of 20:20, 3 February 2022 (UTC)

Tamás Horváth (born 18 June 1987) is a Hungarian goalkeeper who plays for III. Kerületi TVE.
