= Zsolt Szokol =

Hungarian footballer

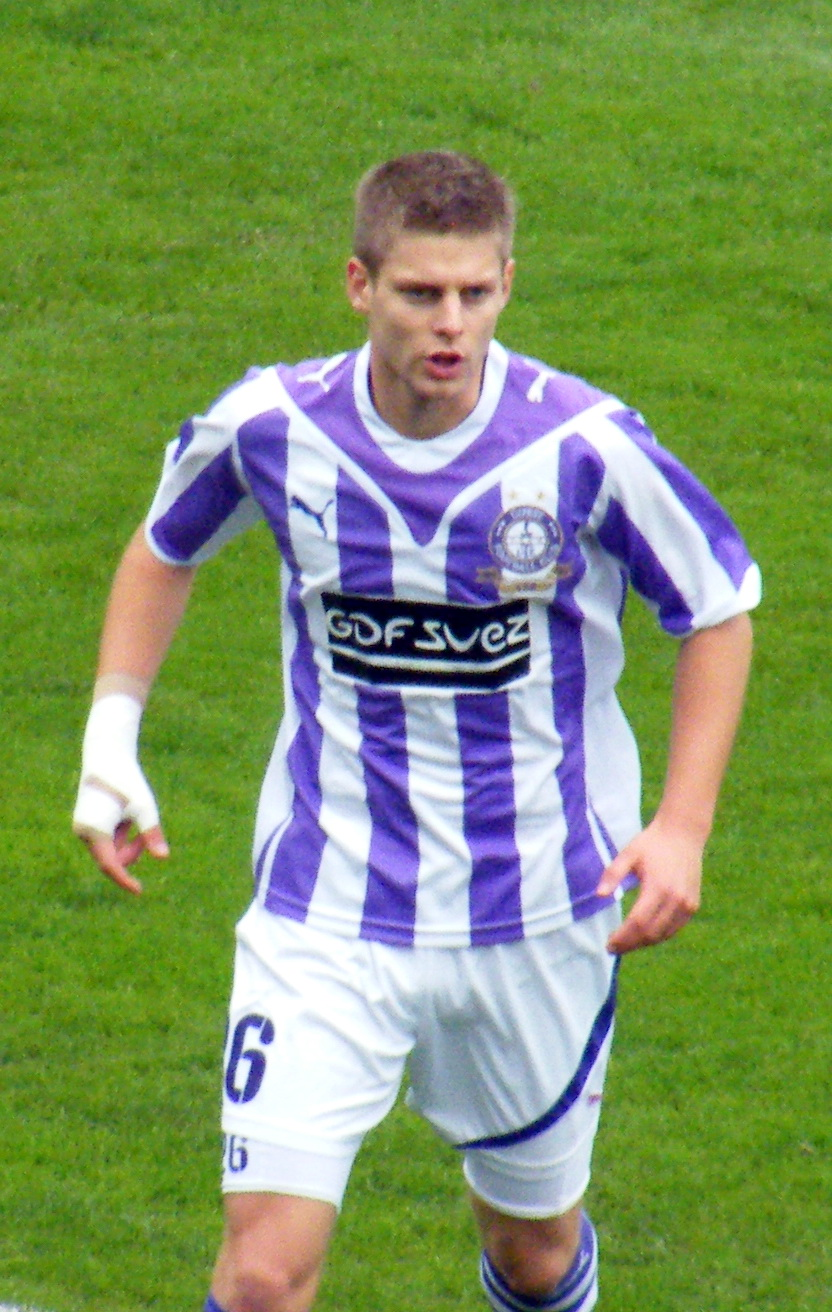

Personal information
- Date of birth: 16 March 1990 (age 36)
- Place of birth: Békéscsaba, Hungary
- Height: 1.85 m (6 ft 1 in)
- Position: Centre back

Team information
- Current team: Sényő

Youth career
- 2002–2008: Békéscsaba

Senior career*
Years	Team	Apps	(Gls)
2008–2010	Békéscsaba	20	(1)
2010–2013	Újpest	56	(0)
2013–2018	Nyíregyháza	80	(1)
2018–2019	Vasas	5	(0)
2019	FC United Zürich	12	(0)
2019–2021	Sényő	36	(2)
2021–2023	Nyíregyháza	73	(2)
2023–	Sényő	10	(1)

International career
2006–2007	Hungary U17		
2010–2012	Hungary U21	14	(0)
- * Club domestic league appearances and goals as of 15 October 2023

Zsolt Szokol (born 16 March 1990) is a Hungarian professional footballer who plays for Sényő. Although uncommon for defenders, Szokol is said to be one of the fastest players of his generation.

== Club career ==
On 18 February 2019, Vasas SC announced, that Szokol would continue his career at FC United Zürich in Switzerland. In the summer 2019, he returned tu Hungary and joined Sényő FC.

== International career ==
In September 2010, he debuted for Hungary, playing in an under-21 against Wales U21.

== Career statistics ==
Appearances and goals by club, season and competition
Club	Season	League			Cup		League Cup		Europe		Total	
Club	Season	Division	Apps	Goals	Apps	Goals	Apps	Goals	Apps	Goals	Apps	Goals
Békéscsaba
Békéscsaba	2008–09	Nemzeti Bajnokság II	6	0	2	0	0	0	0	0	8	0
Békéscsaba	2009–10	Nemzeti Bajnokság II	14	1	4	0	0	0	0	0	18	1
Békéscsaba	Total		20	1	6	0	0	0	0	0	26	1
Újpest
Újpest	2009–10	Nemzeti Bajnokság I	12	0	0	0	1	0	0	0	13	0
Újpest	2010–11	Nemzeti Bajnokság I	29	0	5	0	2	0	0	0	36	0
Újpest	2011–12	Nemzeti Bajnokság I	15	0	4	0	1	0	0	0	20	0
Újpest	2012–13	Nemzeti Bajnokság I	0	0	0	0	2	0	0	0	2	0
Újpest	Total		56	0	7	0	6	0	0	0	69	0
Nyíregyháza
Nyíregyháza	2013–14	Nemzeti Bajnokság II	23	0	2	0	4	0	0	0	29	0
Nyíregyháza	2014–15	Nemzeti Bajnokság I	12	1	1	0	6	0	0	0	19	1
Nyíregyháza	Total		35	1	3	0	10	0	0	0	48	1
Career total			111	2	18	0	16	0	0	0	145	2

Updated to games played as of 9 December 2014.
