= Gábor Dvorschák =

Hungarian footballer

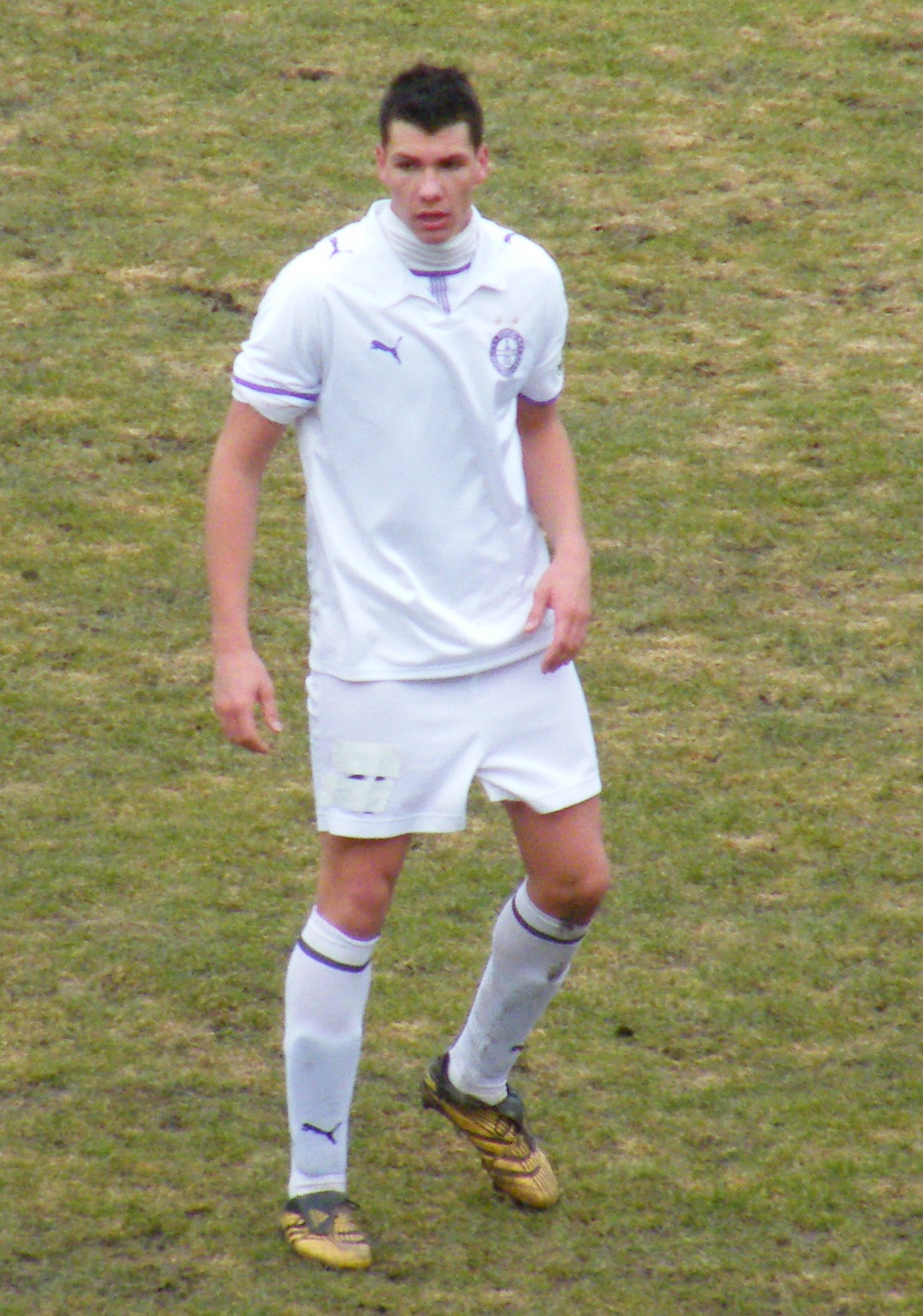

Personal information
- Date of birth: 14 September 1989 (age 37)
- Place of birth: Budapest, Hungary
- Height: 1.90 m (6 ft 3 in)
- Position: Centre back

Team information
- Current team: Táplán

Youth career
- 2002–2008: Újpest

Senior career*
| Years | Team | Apps | (Gls) |
| 2008–2012 | Újpest | 21 | (2) |
| 2009 | → Kecskeméti II (loan) | 10 | (1) |
| 2007–2011 | → Újpest II (loan) | 77 | (14) |
| 2012–2013 | Carl Zeiss Jena | 27 | (3) |
| 2012–2013 | Carl Zeiss Jena II | 4 | (1) |
| 2014–2015 | Haladás | 17 | (2) |
| 2015–2016 | Mezőkövesdi SE | 25 | (1) |
| 2016–2017 | Nyíregyháza Spartacus | 14 | (1) |
| 2017–2019 | Soroksár | 50 | (0) |
| 2019–2021 | Győri ETO | 10 | (1) |
| 2021 | Kaposvár | 12 | (0) |
| 2021–2023 | Kazincbarcika | 39 | (3) |
| 2023– | Táplán | | |
- * Club domestic league appearances and goals as of 1 July 2023

Gábor Dvorschák (born 14 September 1989) is a Hungarian defender who plays for Táplán.
