= 2013–14 Lombard-Pápa TFC season =

Lombard-Pápa TFC
2013–14 season
- Chairman: (Hungary) Péter Bíró
- Manager: (Hungary) Bálint Tóth (until 5 May 2014) (Hungary) Mihály Nagy
- NB 1: 12th
- Hungarian Cup: Quarter-final
- Hungarian League Cup: Quarter-final
- Top goalscorer: League: (Ivory Coast) Georges Griffiths (8); All: (Ivory Coast) Georges Griffiths (11)
- Highest home attendance: 4,000 vs Ferencváros (14 September 2013)
- Lowest home attendance: 200 vs Gyirmót (9 October 2013)
Home colours	Away colours

In 2013–14, Lombard-Pápa TFC played their seventh competitive season and their fifth consecutive season in the OTP Bank Liga. It was their 18th year in existence as a football club.

== First team squad ==
Note: Flags indicate national team as defined under FIFA eligibility rules; some limited exceptions apply. Players may hold more than one non-FIFA nationality.

No.	Pos.	Nation	Player
2	DF	HUN	Sándor Nagy
4	DF	HUN	Gábor Tóth
7	FW	HUN	István Eszlátyi
8	DF	HUN	Tamás Nagy
9	MF	SRB	Lazar Arsić
10	FW	SRB	Goran Marić
11	FW	HUN	Márk Orosz (loan from Ferencváros)
13	DF	SVK	Peter Struhár
15	DF	HUN	Bence Jagodics
19	FW	HUN	Krisztián Kenesei
20	MF	HUN	Kornél Kulcsár (loan from Szombathely)

No.	Pos.	Nation	Player
27	GK	HUN	Lajos Szűcs
29	DF	HUN	Milán Németh
31	MF	HUN	Botond Király
32	DF	HUN	Ádám Présinger
50	FW	CIV	Georges Griffiths
53	MF	HUN	Zoltán Venczel
77	FW	HUN	Richárd Horváth
85	DF	HUN	Csaba Csizmadia
91	MF	HUN	Tamás Tajthy
98	MF	MAR	Youssef Sekour

== Transfers ==
=== Summer ===
In: Note: Flags indicate national team as defined under FIFA eligibility rules; some limited exceptions apply. Players may hold more than one non-FIFA nationality.

No.	Pos.	Nation	Player
6	DF	MKD	Jasmin Mecinović (from Eger)
6	FW	SEN	Mouhamadou Seye (loan return from Zalaegerszeg)
7	FW	HUN	István Eszlátyi (from BKV Előre)
8	DF	HUN	Tamás Nagy (from Diósgyőr)
10	FW	HUN	Gergő Lovrencsics (loan return from (Poland) Lech Poznań)
11	MF	HUN	Márk Orosz (loan from Ferencváros)
12	DF	BIH	Zoran Šupić (from (Romania) UTA Arad)
13	DF	SVK	Peter Struhár (from (Slovakia) Nitra)
13	MF	HUN	Electo Wilson (loan return from BKV Előre)
19	FW	HUN	Krisztián Kenesei (from Szombathely)
22	MF	SRB	Novica Maksimović (from (Serbia) Novi Sad)
23	GK	HUN	Gábor Horváth (from BKV Előre)
40	MF	HUN	Gellért Ivancsics (from Budapest Honvéd)
50	FW	CIV	Georges Griffiths (from (Ivory Coast) Sirocco)
98	MF	MAR	Youssef Sekour (from Diósgyőr)

Out: Note: Flags indicate national team as defined under FIFA eligibility rules; some limited exceptions apply. Players may hold more than one non-FIFA nationality.

No.	Pos.	Nation	Player
3	DF	ESP	Daniel Orozco
6	FW	SEN	Mouhamadou Seye
7	FW	HUN	Máté Szolga
10	FW	HUN	Gergő Lovrencsics (to (Poland) Lech Poznań)
11	FW	HUN	Gergő Beliczky (loan to Gyirmót)
13	MF	HUN	Electo Wilson (to Dabas)
17	FW	CRO	Tino Lagator (to (Croatia) Solin)
23	MF	BIH	Mahir Jasarević (loan return to Zalaegerszeg)
45	GK	HUN	Péter Nacsa (loan return to Győr)
50	FW	CIV	Georges Griffiths (loan return to (Ivory Coast) Sirocco)

=== Winter ===
In: Note: Flags indicate national team as defined under FIFA eligibility rules; some limited exceptions apply. Players may hold more than one non-FIFA nationality.

No.	Pos.	Nation	Player
15	DF	HUN	Bence Jagodics (from Szombathely II)
20	MF	HUN	Kornél Kulcsár (loan from Szombathely)
77	FW	HUN	Richárd Horváth (from Újpest)
85	DF	HUN	Csaba Csizmadia (from Gyirmót)

Out: Note: Flags indicate national team as defined under FIFA eligibility rules; some limited exceptions apply. Players may hold more than one non-FIFA nationality.

No.	Pos.	Nation	Player
6	DF	MKD	Jasmin Mecinović (to (North Macedonia) Gorno Lisiče)
10	MF	HUN	Bence Tóth (to Paks)
12	DF	BIH	Zoran Šupić
14	MF	HUN	Krisztián Dóczi (to Ajka)
20	DF	HUN	István Rodenbücher (to MTK Budapest)
22	MF	SRB	Novica Maksimović (to (Serbia) Sloboda Užice)
28	MF	SVK	Otto Szabó (to (Slovakia) Dunajská Streda)
30	MF	COL	César Quintero (loan to (Colombia) Atlético Nacional)
40	MF	HUN	Gellért Ivancsics (to Siófok)

- List of Hungarian football transfers summer 2013
- List of Hungarian football transfers winter 2013–14

== Statistics ==
=== Appearances and goals ===
Last updated on 1 June 2014.

No.	Pos	Nat	Player	Total		OTP Bank Liga		Hungarian Cup		League Cup	
No.	Pos	Nat	Player	Apps	Goals	Apps	Goals	Apps	Goals	Apps	Goals
2	DF	(Hungary) HUN	Sándor Nagy	18	0	10	0	4	0	4	0
4	DF	(Hungary) HUN	Gábor Tóth	35	3	23	0	5	0	7	3
7	FW	(Hungary) HUN	István Eszlátyi	35	6	23	2	3	1	9	3
8	DF	(Hungary) HUN	Tamás Nagy	22	1	12	1	2	0	8	0
9	MF	(Serbia) SRB	Lazar Arsić	26	6	18	5	3	1	5	0
10	FW	(Serbia) SRB	Goran Marić	12	2	10	2	1	0	1	0
11	FW	(Hungary) HUN	Márk Orosz	30	6	20	3	4	2	6	1
13	DF	(Slovakia) SVK	Peter Struhár	34	2	23	0	5	1	6	1
15	DF	(Hungary) HUN	Bence Jagodics	10	0	5	0	2	0	3	0
19	FW	(Hungary) HUN	Krisztián Kenesei	26	7	22	5	2	0	2	2
20	MF	(Hungary) HUN	Kornél Kulcsár	16	2	11	0	1	0	4	2
27	GK	(Hungary) HUN	Lajos Szűcs	36	-61	30	-50	4	-8	2	-3
29	DF	(Hungary) HUN	Milán Németh	28	0	17	0	3	0	8	0
31	MF	(Hungary) HUN	Botond Király	22	1	12	0	4	1	6	0
32	DF	(Hungary) HUN	Ádám Présinger	33	1	24	1	4	0	5	0
50	FW	(Ivory Coast) CIV	Georges Griffiths	34	11	25	8	4	1	5	2
53	MF	(Hungary) HUN	Zoltán Venczel	3	0	1	0	0	0	2	0
77	FW	(Hungary) HUN	Richárd Horváth	7	0	2	0	2	0	3	0
85	DF	(Hungary) HUN	Csaba Csizmadia	16	3	12	2	2	1	2	0
91	MF	(Hungary) HUN	Tamás Tajthy	22	0	14	0	3	0	5	0
98	MF	(Morocco) MAR	Youssef Sekour	32	1	22	0	3	0	7	1
Youth players:
23	GK	(Hungary) HUN	Gábor Horváth	5	-4	0	0	1	-2	4	-2
33	GK	(Hungary) HUN	Tamás Markek	4	-7	0	0	0	0	4	-7
51	MF	(Hungary) HUN	Konrád Baldauf	3	0	0	0	0	0	3	0
52	DF	(Hungary) HUN	Gergő Bolla	1	0	0	0	0	0	1	0
Out to loan:
30	MF	(Colombia) COL	César Quintero	22	3	16	2	1	1	5	0
Players no longer at the club:
6	DF	(North Macedonia) MKD	Jasmin Mecinović	10	2	5	0	1	0	4	2
10	MF	(Hungary) HUN	Bence Tóth	6	0	5	0	0	0	1	0
12	DF	(Bosnia and Herzegovina) BIH	Zoran Šupić	15	0	12	0	0	0	3	0
14	MF	(Hungary) HUN	Krisztián Dóczi	8	0	2	0	1	0	5	0
20	DF	(Hungary) HUN	István Rodenbücher	19	0	14	0	2	0	3	0
22	MF	(Serbia) SRB	Novica Maksimović	13	0	11	0	0	0	2	0
28	MF	(Slovakia) SVK	Otto Szabó	19	0	13	0	3	0	3	0
40	MF	(Hungary) HUN	Gellért Ivancsics	6	0	4	0	0	0	2	0

=== Top scorers ===
Includes all competitive matches. The list is sorted by shirt number when total goals are equal.

Last updated on 1 June 2014

Position	Nation	Number	Name	OTP Bank Liga	Hungarian Cup	League Cup	Total
1	(Ivory Coast)	50	Georges Griffiths	8	1	2	11
2	(Hungary)	19	Krisztián Kenesei	5	0	2	7
3	(Serbia)	9	Lazar Arsić	5	1	0	6
4	(Hungary)	11	Márk Orosz	3	2	1	6
5	(Hungary)	7	István Eszlátyi	2	1	3	6
6	(Colombia)	30	César Quintero	2	1	0	3
7	(Hungary)	85	Csaba Csizmadia	2	1	0	3
8	(Hungary)	4	Gábor Tóth	0	0	3	3
9	(Serbia)	10	Goran Marić	2	0	0	2
10	(Slovakia)	13	Peter Struhár	0	1	1	2
11	(North Macedonia)	6	Jasmin Mecinović	0	0	2	2
12	(Hungary)	20	Kornél Kulcsár	0	0	2	2
13	(Hungary)	32	Ádám Présinger	1	0	0	1
14	(Hungary)	8	Tamás Nagy	1	0	0	1
15	(Hungary)	31	Botond Király	0	1	0	1
16	(Morocco)	98	Youssef Sekour	0	0	1	1
/	/	/	Own Goals	1	0	1	2
			TOTALS	32	9	18	59

=== Disciplinary record ===
Includes all competitive matches. Players with 1 card or more included only.

Last updated on 1 June 2014

Position	Nation	Number	Name	OTP Bank Liga		Hungarian Cup		League Cup		Total (Hu Total)	
Position	Nation	Number	Name	Booked	Sent off (straight red)	Booked	Sent off (straight red)	Booked	Sent off (straight red)	Booked	Sent off (straight red)
DF	(Hungary)	2	Sándor Nagy	2	0	0	0	1	0	3 (2)	0 (0)
DF	(Hungary)	4	Gábor Tóth	13	1	2	0	1	0	16 (13)	1 (1)
DF	(North Macedonia)	6	Jasmin Mecinović	2	0	1	0	0	0	3 (2)	0 (0)
DF	(Hungary)	8	Tamás Nagy	5	0	0	0	0	0	5 (5)	0 (0)
MF	(Serbia)	9	Lazar Arsić	3	0	1	0	2	0	6 (3)	0 (0)
MF	(Hungary)	10	Bence Tóth	2	0	0	0	1	0	3 (2)	0 (0)
FW	(Serbia)	10	Goran Marić	0	0	1	0	0	0	1 (0)	0 (0)
FW	(Hungary)	11	Márk Orosz	1	0	0	0	2	0	3 (1)	0 (0)
DF	(Bosnia and Herzegovina)	12	Zoran Šupić	4	1	0	0	0	0	4 (4)	1 (1)
DF	(Slovakia)	13	Peter Struhár	5	0	1	0	3	0	9 (5)	0 (0)
DF	(Hungary)	15	Bence Jagodics	4	0	0	0	0	0	4 (4)	0 (0)
FW	(Hungary)	19	Krisztián Kenesei	3	0	0	0	1	0	4 (3)	0 (0)
MF	(Hungary)	20	Kornél Kulcsár	4	1	0	0	2	0	6 (4)	1 (1)
DF	(Hungary)	20	István Rodenbücher	5	1	0	0	1	0	6 (5)	1 (1)
DF	(Serbia)	22	Novica Maksimović	4	0	0	0	2	0	6 (4)	0 (0)
GK	(Hungary)	27	Lajos Szűcs	1	0	1	0	0	0	2 (1)	0 (0)
MF	(Slovakia)	28	Otto Szabó	3	0	0	0	0	0	3 (3)	0 (0)
DF	(Hungary)	29	Milán Németh	2	0	2	0	1	0	5 (2)	0 (0)
MF	(Colombia)	30	César Quintero	2	0	0	1	1	0	3 (2)	1 (0)
MF	(Hungary)	31	Botond Király	1	0	0	0	1	0	2 (1)	0 (0)
DF	(Hungary)	32	Ádám Présinger	6	0	1	0	1	0	8 (6)	0 (0)
MF	(Hungary)	40	Gellért Ivancsics	0	0	0	0	1	0	1 (0)	0 (0)
FW	(Ivory Coast)	50	Georges Griffiths	5	1	0	0	0	0	5 (5)	1 (1)
MF	(Hungary)	53	Zoltán Venczel	0	0	0	0	1	0	1 (0)	0 (0)
FW	(Hungary)	77	Richárd Horváth	1	0	0	0	0	0	1 (1)	0 (0)
DF	(Hungary)	85	Csaba Csizmadia	1	1	0	1	0	0	1 (1)	2 (1)
MF	(Hungary)	91	Tamás Tajthy	2	0	1	0	1	0	4 (2)	0 (0)
MF	(Morocco)	98	Youssef Sekour	11	0	2	0	0	0	13 (11)	0 (0)
			TOTALS	92	6	13	2	23	0	128 (92)	8 (6)

=== Overall ===
Games played	45 (30 OTP Bank Liga, 5 Hungarian Cup and 10 Hungarian League Cup)
Games won	16 (9 OTP Bank Liga, 2 Hungarian Cup and 5 Hungarian League Cup)
Games drawn	11 (6 OTP Bank Liga, 2 Hungarian Cup and 3 Hungarian League Cup)
Games lost	18 (15 OTP Bank Liga, 1 Hungarian Cup and 2 Hungarian League Cup)
Goals scored	59
Goals conceded	72
Goal difference	-13
Yellow cards	128
Red cards	8
Worst discipline	(Hungary) Gábor Tóth (16 (yellow card) , 1 (red card) )
Best result	5–1 (A) v Kecskemét – Ligakupa – 22-02-2014
Best result	4–0 (H) v Kecskemét – Ligakupa – 04-03-2014
Worst result	0–4 (A) v Ferencváros – Ligakupa – 19-03-2014
Worst result	0–4 (A) v Ferencváros – OTP Bank Liga – 19-03-2014
Worst result	1–5 (H) v Debrecen – OTP Bank Liga – 04-05-2014
Worst result	0–4 (A) v Paks – OTP Bank Liga – 17-05-2014
Most appearances	(Hungary) Lajos Szűcs (36 appearances)
Top scorer	(Ivory Coast) Georges Griffiths (11 goals)
Points	59/135 (43.7%)

Last updated: 1 June 2014

== Nemzeti Bajnokság I ==
=== Matches ===
26 July 2013 1	Pápa	1–1	Puskás	Pápa, Veszprém County
19:00 CEST	Eszlátyi 63'	(Report)	Vaszicsku 82'	Stadium: Stadion Várkerti; Attendance: 2,000; Referee: (Hungary) Zoltán Iványi

4 August 2013 2	Honvéd	0–1	Pápa	Budapest, Pest County
18:30 CEST		(Report)	Griffiths 88'	Stadium: Bozsik Stadion; Attendance: 900; Referee: (Hungary) Mihály Fábián

10 August 2013 3	Pápa	1–0	Kaposvár	Pápa, Veszprém County
19:00 CEST	Dankwah 1' (o.g.)	(Report)		Stadium: Stadion Várkerti; Attendance: 1,000; Referee: (Hungary) Dániel Becséri

17 August 2013 4	Mezőkövesd	0–2	Pápa	Mezőkövesd, Borsod-Abaúj-Zemplén County
19:00 CEST		(Report)	Griffiths 4', 30'	Stadium: Mezőkövesdi Városi Stadion; Attendance: 4,000; Referee: (Hungary) Viktor Kassai

24 August 2013 5	Pápa	0–1	Diósgyőr	Pápa, Veszprém County
16:30 CEST		(Report)	Nagy 88' (o.g.)	Stadium: Stadion Várkerti; Attendance: 2,000; Referee: (Hungary) József Erdős

30 August 2013 6	Haladás	3–2	Pápa	Szombathely, Vas County
19:00 CEST	Radó 13', 47' (pen.); Halmosi 36'	(Report)	Griffiths 21'; Arsić 89'	Stadium: Rohonci úti Stadion; Attendance: 3,510; Referee: (Hungary) Ádám Farkas

14 September 2013 7	Pápa	0–2	Ferencváros	Pápa, Veszprém County
20:00 CEST		(Report)	Böde 2'; Holman 46'	Stadium: Stadion Várkerti; Attendance: 4,000; Referee: (Hungary) Viktor Kassai

20 September 2013 8	Pécs	1–3	Pápa	Pécs, Baranya County
19:00 CEST	Mohl 43' (pen.)	(Report)	Orosz 6'; Quintero 39', 64'	Stadium: Stadion PMFC; Attendance: 1,700; Referee: (Hungary) István Vad

28 September 2013 9	Pápa	1–2	Videoton	Pápa, Veszprém County
14:00 CEST	Griffiths 10'	(Report)	Nikolić 2', 6'	Stadium: Stadion Várkerti; Attendance: 1,500; Referee: (Hungary) Ádám Farkas

5 October 2013 10	Győr	4–1	Pápa	Győr, Győr-Moson-Sopron County
14:00 CEST	Pátkai 32'; Trajković 55'; Andrić 57'; Koltai 59'	(Report)	Arsić 81'	Stadium: ETO Park; Attendance: 1,800; Referee: (Hungary) Dániel Becséri

19 October 2013 11	Pápa	0–2	MTK	Pápa, Veszprém County
16:00 CEST		(Report)	Bese 54'; Pölöskei 57'	Stadium: Stadion Várkerti; Attendance: 1,200; Referee: (Hungary) Viktor Kassai

26 October 2013 12	Debrecen	2–2	Pápa	Debrecen, Hajdú-Bihar County
14:00 CEST	Struhár 6' (o.g.); Sidibe 63' (pen.)	(Report)	Kenesei 87'; Orosz 90+2'	Stadium: Stadion Oláh Gábor Út; Attendance: 4,500; Referee: (Hungary) Zsolt Szabó

1 November 2013 13	Pápa	3–1	Kecskemét	Pápa, Veszprém County
19:00 CET	Arsić 22', 52'; Kenesei 49'	(Report)	Balázs 37'	Stadium: Stadion Várkerti; Attendance: 1,500; Referee: (Hungary) Ádám Farkas

9 November 2013 14	Pápa	1–0	Paks	Pápa, Veszprém County
16:00 CET	Orosz 62'	(Report)		Stadium: Stadion Várkerti; Attendance: 800; Referee: (Hungary) Sándor Andó-Szabó

23 November 2013 15	Újpest	4–2	Pápa	Budapest, Pest County
18:00 CET	Litauszki 3'; Simon 28'; Stanisavljević 43', 50'	(Report)	Kenesei 7'; Présinger 31'	Stadium: Szusza Ferenc Stadium; Attendance: 1,338; Referee: (Hungary) Dániel Becséri

30 November 2013 16	Puskás	1–0	Pápa	Székesfehérvár, Fejér County
16:00 CET	Lencse 35' (pen.)	(Report)		Stadium: Sóstói Stadion; Attendance: 100; Referee: (Hungary) Zsolt Szabó

7 December 2013 17	Pápa	1–0	Honvéd	Pápa, Veszprém County
20:00 CET	Griffiths 2'	(Report)		Stadium: Stadion Várkerti; Attendance: 450; Referee: (Hungary) József Erdős

1 March 2014 18	Kaposvár	1–1	Pápa	Kaposvár, Somogy County
16:00 CET	Balázs 32'	(Report)	Kenesei 84'	Stadium: Stadion Kaposvár Rákóczi; Attendance: 1,500; Referee: (Hungary) Mihály Fábián

7 March 2014 19	Pápa	1–1	Mezőkövesd	Pápa, Veszprém County
19:00 CET	Csizmadia 89'	(Report)	Menougong 78'	Stadium: Stadion Várkerti; Attendance: 1,500; Referee: (Hungary) István Vad

14 March 2014 20	Diósgyőr	2–1	Pápa	Miskolc, Borsod-Abaúj-Zemplén County
19:00 CET	Gosztonyi 75', 80' (pen.)	(Report)	Griffiths 40'	Stadium: DVTK Stadion; Attendance: 4,597; Referee: (Hungary) Ádám Farkas

21 March 2014 21	Pápa	1–1	Haladás	Pápa, Veszprém County
19:00 CET	Marić 86'	(Report)	Radó 26'	Stadium: Stadion Várkerti; Attendance: 2,500; Referee: (Hungary) Ádám Németh

29 March 2014 22	Ferencváros	4–0	Pápa	Budapest, Pest County
18:00 CET	Leonardo 32' (pen.); Böde 36'; Mateos 53' (pen.); Somália 75'	(Report)		Stadium: Ferenc Puskás Stadium; Attendance: 6,122; Referee: (Hungary) Dániel Becséri

5 April 2014 23	Pápa	1–0	Pécs	Pápa, Veszprém County
16:00 CEST	Nagy 29'	(Report)		Stadium: Stadion Várkerti; Attendance: 1,200; Referee: (Hungary) Mihály Fábián

12 April 2014 24	Videoton	2–2	Pápa	Székesfehérvár, Fejér County
16:00 CEST	Zé Luís 53'; Alvarez 62'	(Report)	Arsić 10'; Marić 58'	Stadium: Sóstói Stadion; Attendance: 2,200; Referee: (Hungary) Ádám Németh

19 April 2014 25	Pápa	1–2	Győr	Pápa, Veszprém County
14:00 CEST	Eszlátyi 81'	(Report)	Kamber 40'; Střeštík 45'	Stadium: Stadion Várkerti; Attendance: 2,000; Referee: (Hungary) Zoltán Iványi

26 April 2014 26	MTK	2–0	Pápa	Budapest, Pest County
16:00 CEST	Torghelle 10', 26'	(Report)		Stadium: Hidegkuti Nándor Stadium; Attendance: 600; Referee: (Hungary) József Erdős

4 May 2014 27	Pápa	1–5	Debrecen	Pápa, Veszprém County
18:30 CEST	Griffiths 43'	(Report)	Sidibe 40', 53' (pen.); Mihelič 46'; Seydi 87', 89'	Stadium: Stadion Várkerti; Attendance: 1,500; Referee: (Hungary) Viktor Kassai

10 May 2014 28	Kecskemét	1–0	Pápa	Kecskemét, Bács-Kiskun County
16:00 CEST	Savić 3'	(Report)		Stadium: Széktói Stadion; Attendance: 1,980; Referee: (Hungary) Dániel Becséri

17 May 2014 29	Paks	4–0	Pápa	Paks, Tolna County
16:00 CEST	Könyves 39'; Bartha 49'; Simon 80'; Heffler 84'	(Report)		Stadium: Stadion PSE; Attendance: 1,000; Referee: (Hungary) István Vad

31 May 2014 30	Pápa	2–1	Újpest	Pápa, Veszprém County
16:00 CEST	Csizmadia 84'; Kenesei 87'	(Report)	Suljić 17'	Stadium: Stadion Várkerti; Attendance: 1,200; Referee: (Hungary) Zsolt Szabó

=== Classification ===
Pos	Team	Pld	W	D	L	GF	GA	GD	Pts
10	Kecskemét	30	9	9	12	36	51	−15	36
11	Paks	30	8	10	12	39	42	−3	34
12	Pápa	30	9	6	15	32	50	−18	33
13	Újpest	30	8	8	14	46	51	−5	32
14	Puskás Akadémia	30	8	7	15	36	51	−15	31

Source: mlsz.hu (in Hungarian)
Rules for classification: 1st points; 2nd overall wins; 3rd goal difference; 4th head-to-head points; 5th head-to-head goal difference; 6th head-to-head away goals scored; 7th fair-play points; 8th drawing of lots

=== Results summary ===
Overall								Home						Away					
Pld	W	D	L	GF	GA	GD	Pts	W	D	L	GF	GA	GD	W	D	L	GF	GA	GD
30	9	6	15	32	50	−18	33	6	3	6	15	19	−4	3	3	9	17	31	−14

Last updated: 1 June 2014.
Source: NB1

=== Results by round ===
Round	1	2	3	4	5	6	7	8	9	10	11	12	13	14	15	16	17	18	19	20	21	22	23	24	25	26	27	28	29	30
Ground	H	A	H	A	H	A	H	A	H	A	H	A	H	H	A	A	H	A	H	A	H	A	H	A	H	A	H	A	A	H
Result	D	W	W	W	L	L	L	W	L	L	L	D	W	W	L	L	W	D	D	L	D	L	W	D	L	L	L	L	L	W
Position	9	6	4	3	3	4	6	5	6	9	11	11	8	8	9	9	8	9	9	9	10	12	10	8	10	10	11	12	13	12

Updated to match(es) played on 1 June 2014. Source: Matches
A = Away; H = Home; W = Win; D = Draw; L = Loss

== Hungarian Cup ==
29 October 2013 Round of 32	Kisvárda	3–4	Pápa	Kisvárda, Szabolcs-Szatmár-Bereg County
12:30 CET	Hegedűs 40' (pen.); Kapacina 61'; Üveges 70'	(Report)	Király 21'; Struhár 58'; Quintero 72'; Orosz 76'	Stadium: Stadion Várkerti; Attendance: 400; Referee: (Hungary) József Berger

27 November 2013 Round of 16 (1st leg)	Siófok	1–2	Pápa	Siófok, Somogy County
13:00 CET	Pál 68'	(Report)	Orosz 24'; Griffiths 46'	Stadium: Révész Street Stadium; Attendance: 100; Referee: (Hungary) Ádám Németh

4 December 2013 Round of 16 (2nd leg)	Pápa	1–1 (3–2 agg.)	Siófok	Pápa, Veszprém County
16:00 CET	Eszlátyi 85'	Report	Pál 47'	Stadium: Stadion Várkerti; Attendance: 300; Referee: (Hungary) Ádám Farkas

11 March 2014 Quarter-final (1st leg)	Pápa	2–2	Diósgyőr	Pápa, Veszprém County
17:00 CET	Csizmadia 40'; Arsić 69'	(Report)	Abdouraman 2'; Marjanović 74'	Stadium: Stadion Várkerti; Attendance: 300; Referee: (Hungary) Dániel Becséri

26 March 2014 Quarter-final (2nd leg)	Diósgyőr	3–0 (5–2 agg.)	Pápa	Miskolc, Borsod-Abaúj-Zemplén County
18:00 CET	Futács 16', 29' (pen.); Kostić 78'	Report		Stadium: DVTK Stadion; Attendance: 2,239; Referee: (Hungary) Zoltán Iványi

== League Cup ==
=== Group stage ===
4 September 2013 1	Pápa	2–2	Ajka	Pápa, Veszprém County
17:00 CEST	Mecinović 69', 77'	(Report)	Sowunmi 9'; Varga 55'	Stadium: Stadion Várkerti; Attendance: 300; Referee: (Hungary) Csaba Pintér

11 September 2013 2	Pápa	2–0	Szombathely	Pápa, Veszprém County
17:00 CEST	Eszlátyi 34'; Sekour 88'	(Report)		Stadium: Stadion Várkerti; Attendance: 300; Referee: (Hungary) Béla Botló

9 October 2013 3	Pápa	2–1	Gyirmót	Pápa, Veszprém County
16:00 CEST	Griffiths 20'; Eszlátyi 83'	(Report)	Laki 86'	Stadium: Stadion Várkerti; Attendance: 200; Referee: (Hungary) Norbert Kiss

15 October 2013 4	Gyirmót	2–2	Pápa	Győr, Győr-Moson-Sopron County
16:00 CEST	Kelemen 42'; Tóth 72'	(Report)	Eszlátyi 81'; Holczer 84' (o.g.)	Stadium: Stadium Ménfő Street; Attendance: 300; Referee: (Hungary) Ádám Radványi

13 November 2013 5	Haladás	0–0	Pápa	Szombathely, Vas County
13:30 CET		(Report)		Stadium: Illés Akadémia; Attendance: 50; Referee: (Hungary) Gergely Szőts

20 November 2013 6	Ajka	0–1	Pápa	Ajka, Veszprém County
13:00 CET		(Report)	Struhár 6'	Stadium: Stadium Sport Street; Attendance: 100; Referee: (Hungary) Gábor Barna

==== Classification ====
Pos	Team	Pld	W	D	L	GF	GA	GD	Pts	Qualification
1	Pápa	6	3	3	0	9	5	+4	12	Advance to knockout phase
2	Szombathely	6	3	2	1	14	9	+5	11	Advance to knockout phase
3	Gyirmót	6	2	2	2	13	11	+2	8	
4	Ajka	6	0	1	5	7	18	−11	1	

Rules for classification: 1) points; 2) goal difference; 3) number of goals scored.

=== Knockout phase ===
22 February 2013 Round of 16 (1st leg)	Kecskemét	1–5	Pápa	Kecskemét, Bács-Kiskun County
13:00 CET	Balázs 76'	(Report)	Kenesei 5' (pen.), 40'; Tóth 34', 47'; Orosz 78'	Stadium: Széktói Stadion; Attendance: 200; Referee: (Hungary) János Takács

4 March 2014 Round of 16 (2nd leg)	Pápa	4–0 (9–1 agg.)	Kecskemét	Pápa, Veszprém County
16:00 CET	Tóth 12'; Griffiths 39'; Kulcsár 44', 84'	(Report)		Stadium: Stadion Várkerti; Attendance: 200; Referee: (Hungary) Balázs Böcskei

19 March 2014 Quarter-final (1st leg)	Ferencváros	4–0	Pápa	Budapest, Pest County
18:00 CET	Ugrai 5' (pen.), 9'; Jenner 61'; Holman 84'	(Report)		Stadium: Ferenc Puskás Stadium; Attendance: 1,200; Referee: (Hungary) Mihály Fábián

1 April 2014 Quarter-final (2nd leg)	Pápa	0–2 (0–6 agg.)	Ferencváros	Pápa, Veszprém County
17:00 CEST		(Report)	Ugrai 24'; Diallo 44'	Stadium: Stadion Várkerti; Attendance: 300; Referee: (Hungary) Ádám Radványi

== Pre-season ==
2 July 2013 1	SV Mattersburg (Austria)	1–0	(Hungary) Lombard-Pápa TFC	Deutschkreutz, Austria
CEST	Mayr 34'	(Report)		Attendance: 200; Referee: (Austria) R. Kovac

6 July 2013 2	Lombard-Pápa TFC (Hungary)	2–1	(Romania) AFC Săgeata Năvodari	Jois, Austria
CEST	Eszlátyi	(Report)	Roman	Attendance: 100

10 July 2013 3	Lombard-Pápa TFC (Hungary)	3–0	(Slovakia) FK Slovan Duslo Šaľa	Lipót, Hungary
CEST	Marić; Eszlátyi (pen.); Király	(Report)		Attendance: 100; Referee: (Hungary) Tamás Bognár

13 July 2013 4	Lombard-Pápa TFC (Hungary)	0–0	(Hungary) Zalaegerszegi TE	Pápa, Hungary
CEST		(Report)		Attendance: 300; Referee: (Hungary) Zoltán J. Kovács

17 July 2013 5	Lombard-Pápa TFC (Hungary)	5–0	(Bosnia and Herzegovina) FK Sarajevo	Heiligenkreuz im Lafnitztal, Austria
CEST	Griffiths; Orosz; Eszlátyi; Arsić; Kenesei	(Report)		Attendance: 100; Referee: (Austria) Strack

20 July 2013 6	Lombard-Pápa TFC (Hungary)	3–1	(Hungary) FC Ajka	Pápa, Hungary
CEST	Eszlátyi (pen.); Orosz	(Report)	Skriba	Attendance: 300; Referee: (Hungary) Imre Schnellbach
