= 2012–13 Nemzeti Bajnokság I =

Nemzeti Bajnokság I
- Season: 2012–13
- Dates: 27 July 2012 – 2 June 2013
- Champions: Győr
- Relegated: Siófok; Eger
- Champions League: Győr
- Europa League: Videoton; Honvéd; Debrecen
- Matches: 240
- Goals: 575 (2.4 per match)
- Top goalscorer: Adamo Coulibaly (16 goals)
- Biggest home win: Győr 6–0 Pápa; Videoton 6–0 Siófok
- Biggest away win: Újpest 0–6 Paks
- Highest scoring: Honvéd 5–3 Rákóczi
- Longest winning run: 7 games Győr
- Longest unbeaten run: 22 games Győr
- Longest winless run: 15 games Eger
- Longest losing run: 9 games Eger

The 2012–13 Nemzeti Bajnokság I, also known as NB I, was the 111th season of top-tier football in Hungary. The league is officially named OTP Bank Liga for sponsorship reasons. The season began 27 July 2012 and ended on 2 June 2013. Debrecen were the defending champions having won their sixth Hungarian championship last season.

== Overview ==
The championship was contested by 16 teams, and Győri-ETO won the title under headcoach Attila Pintér, for the fourth time in their history.

Although the team from Rába-coast lost their first game 4-1 at the home of defending champions Debreceni VSC, Győr then went on an 18-game undefeated streak, winning 13 of those encounters. Győr defeated Budapest-giants Újpest and Ferencváros in back-to-back victories, confirming their championship against the latter on the 12th of May, after a 1-0 victory.

Győr's road to glory was largely uncontested, apart from Videoton applying some pressure, however, even the Fehérvár-club finished 10 points off of Győr.

== Teams ==
Zalaegerszegi TE and Vasas SC finished the 2011–12 season in the last two places and thus were relegated to their respective NB II divisions.

The two relegated teams were replaced with the champions of the two 2011–12 NB II groups, Eger of the East Group and MTK of the West Group. MTK made their immediate comeback to the league, while Eger returned to the competition for the first time since the 1986–87 season.

=== Stadia and locations ===
Location of teams in 2012–13 Nemzeti Bajnokság I

Following is the list of clubs competing in 2012–13 Nemzeti Bajnokság I, with their location, stadium and stadium capacity.

Team	Short name	Location	Stadium	Capacity
Budapest Honvéd FC	Honvéd	Budapest	Bozsik József Stadion	9,500
Debreceni VSC	Debrecen	Debrecen	Oláh Gábor utcai stadion	10,200
Diósgyőri VTK	Diósgyőr	Miskolc	Diósgyőri Stadion (1939)	11,398
Egri FC	Eger	Eger	Szentmarjay Tibor Városi Stadion	6,000
Ferencvárosi TC	Ferencváros	Budapest	Albert Flórián Stadion	15,804
Győri ETO FC	Győr	Győr	ETO Park	15,600
Kaposvári Rákóczi FC	Rákóczi	Kaposvár	Rákóczi Stadion	7,000
Kecskeméti TE	Kecskemét	Kecskemét	Széktói Stadion	6,320
Lombard-Pápa TFC	Pápa	Pápa	Perutz Stadion	5,500
MTK Budapest FC	MTK	Budapest	Hidegkuti Nándor stadion	7,515
Paksi SE	Paks	Paks	Fehérvári úti stadion	4,400
Pécsi MFC	Pécs	Pécs	PMFC Stadion	7,000
BFC Siófok	Siófok	Siófok	Révész Géza utcai stadion	6,500
Szombathelyi Haladás	Haladás	Szombathely	Rohonci úti stadion	9,500
Újpest FC	Újpest	Budapest	Szusza Ferenc stadion	13,501
Videoton FC	Videoton	Székesfehérvár	Sóstói stadion	14,300

=== Personnel and kits ===
Following is the list of clubs competing in 2012–13 Nemzeti Bajnokság I, with their manager, captain, kit manufacturer and shirt sponsor.
Note: Flags indicate national team as has been defined under FIFA eligibility rules. Players and Managers may hold more than one non-FIFA nationality.

Team	Manager	Captain	Kit manufacturer	Shirt sponsor
Debrecen	(Hungary) Elemér Kondás	(Hungary) Péter Szakály	adidas	TEVA
Diósgyőr	(Croatia) Zoltán Kovac	(Spain) José Juan Luque	Nike	–
Eger	(Hungary) Ferenc Mészáros	(Czech Republic) Petr Knakal	Legea	Formidus
Ferencváros	(Netherlands) Ricardo Moniz	(Netherlands) Mark Otten	Nike	Grupama Garancia
Győr	(Hungary) Attila Pintér	(Serbia) Saša Stevanović	Puma	Audi, Qaestor
Haladás	(Hungary) Tamás Artner	(Hungary) Péter Tóth	Legea	Sopron Bank, Contact Zrt.
Honvéd	(Italy) Marco Rossi	(Hungary) Szabolcs Kemenes	Givova	—
Rákóczi	(Hungary) László Prukner	(Hungary) István Bank	Toti Sport	Regale Klíma
Kecskemét	(Hungary) Ferenc Horváth	(Montenegro) Vladan Savić	Jako	Phoenix Mecano, Bertrans
MTK	(Hungary) József Garami	(Hungary) József Kanta	Nike	Fotex, Sándor Károly Akadémia
Paks	(Serbia) Tomislav Sivić	(Hungary) Tamás Kiss	Jako	MVM-Atomerőmű
Pápa	(Hungary) Bálint Tóth	(Hungary) Lajos Szűcs	Jako	Lombard
Pécs	(Hungary) Gábor Márton	(Hungary) Levente Lantos	Puma	Matias
Siófok	(Hungary) Károly Horváth	(Hungary) Tibor Nyári	Puma	AVE, Femol '97
Újpest	(Belgium) Marc Lelièvre	(Hungary) Krisztián Vermes	Puma	—
Videoton	(Portugal) José Manuel Gomes	(Hungary) György Sándor	Nike	MOL

==== Managerial changes ====
Team	Outgoing manager	Manner of departure	Date of vacancy	Position in table	Replaced by	Date of appointment
Honvéd	(Hungary) Attila Supka	Contract expired	Summer 2012	Pre-season	(Italy) Marco Rossi	1 June 2012
Pécs	(Hungary) Olivér Mink	Contract expired	Summer 2012	Pre-season	(Hungary) Attila Supka	1 June 2012
Újpest	(Belgium) Marc Lelièvre	Caretaker	Summer 2012	Pre-season	(Belgium) Jos Daerden	1 June 2012
Diósgyőr	(Hungary) Lázár Szentes	Contract expired	Summer 2012	Pre-season	(Hungary) Tibor Sisa	14 June 2012
Rákóczi	(Hungary) Tibor Sisa	Contract expired	Summer 2012	Pre-season	(Hungary) László Prukner	14 June 2012
Paks ^{2}	(Hungary) Károly Kis	Mutual agreement	1 August 2012	11th	(Serbia) Tomislav Sivić	30 August 2012
Ferencváros	(Hungary) Lajos Détári	Mutual agreement	20 August 2012	9th	(Netherlands) Ricardo Moniz	21 August 2012
Pápa ^{3}	(Hungary) Ferenc Bene	Mutual agreement	27 August 2012	15th	(Hungary) Gyula Zsivoczky	1 September 2012
Kecskemét ^{4}	(Hungary) László Török	Resigned	17 September 2012	14th	(Hungary) Ferenc Horváth	28 September 2012
Diósgyőr	(Hungary) Tibor Sisa	Resigned	22 November 2012	9th	(Hungary) Lázár Szentes	22 November 2012
Pécs	(Hungary) Attila Supka	Sacked	4 January 2013	14th	(Hungary) Gábor Márton	5 January 2013
Videoton	(Portugal) Paulo Sousa	Mutual agreement	7 January 2013	4th	(Portugal) José Manuel Gomes	20 January 2013
Egri FC	(Hungary) Antal Simon	Sacked	14 February 2013	15th	(Hungary) Ferenc Mészáros	8 March 2013
Újpest	(Belgium) Jos Daerden	Mutual agreement	5 March 2013	11th	(Belgium) Marc Leliévre	5 May 2013
Diósgyőr	(Hungary) Lázár Szentes	Mutual agreement	16 April 2013	9th	(Croatia) Zoltán Kovác	17 April 2013
Pápa	(Hungary) Gyula Zsivoczky	Mutual agreement	6 May 2013	14>th	(Hungary) László Kovács	7 May 2013
Pápa	(Hungary) László Kovács	Mutual agreement	27 May 2013	14th	(Hungary) Bálint Tóth	27 May 2013

Notes

^{2} Between 1 and 30 August Csaba Máté was the caretaker manager of Paks.
^{3} Between 27 August and 1 September László Kovács was the caretaker manager of Pápa.
^{4} Between 17 and 28 September István Szabó was the caretaker manager of Kecskemét.

== League table ==
Pos	Team	Pld	W	D	L	GF	GA	GD	Pts	Qualification or relegation
1	Győr (C)	30	19	7	4	57	33	+24	64	Qualification for Champions League second qualifying round
2	Videoton	30	16	6	8	52	24	+28	54	Qualification for Europa League first qualifying round
3	Honvéd	30	15	7	8	50	36	+14	52	Qualification for Europa League first qualifying round
4	MTK	30	15	6	9	43	30	+13	51	
5	Ferencváros	30	13	10	7	51	36	+15	49	
6	Debrecen	30	14	4	12	47	36	+11	46	Qualification for Europa League second qualifying round (Note: Debrecen qualified for the Europa League second qualifying round as the 2012–13 Magyar Kupa winners.)
7	Kecskemét	30	12	8	10	42	42	0	44	
8	Haladás	30	11	11	8	36	27	+9	44	
9	Újpest	30	11	8	11	40	42	−2	41	
10	Diósgyőr	30	9	11	10	31	39	−8	38	
11	Kaposvári Rákóczi	30	10	7	13	35	38	−3	37	
12	Pécs	30	10	7	13	33	44	−11	37	
13	Paks	30	8	11	11	40	38	+2	35	
14	Pápa	30	7	7	16	26	46	−20	28	
15	Siófok (R)	30	7	4	19	31	61	−30	25	Relegation to Nemzeti Bajnokság II
16	Eger (R)	30	3	6	21	25	67	−42	15	Relegation to Nemzeti Bajnokság II

Source: mlsz.hu (in Hungarian)
Rules for classification: 1st points; 2nd overall wins; 3rd goal difference; 4th head-to-head points; 5th head-to-head goal difference; 6th head-to-head away goals scored; 7th fair-play points; 8th drawing of lots
(C) Champions; (R) Relegated

=== Positions by round ===
Team ╲ Round	1	2	3	4	5	6	7	8	9	10	11	12	13	14	15	16	17	18	19	20	21	22	23	24	25	26	27	28	29	30
Győr	16	15	9	7	4	2	3	1	1	1	1	1	1	1	1	1	1	1	1	1	1	1	1	1	1	1	1	1	1	1
Videoton	8	5	8	5	5	5	4	5	5	7	7	4	4	4	4	4	4	4	4	3	3	3	3	2	2	2	2	2	2	2
Honvéd	6	1	1	1	1	4	5	4	4	5	6	6	5	5	5	5	5	8	6	6	7	7	6	6	5	4	4	4	3	3
MTK	3	3	6	4	3	1	1	2	3	3	3	3	3	3	2	2	2	2	2	2	2	2	2	3	3	3	3	3	4	4
Ferencváros	10	10	5	9	10	9	8	8	7	6	5	5	8	6	7	7	6	5	5	4	4	4	4	4	6	5	6	6	5	5
Debrecen	1	6	3	2	2	3	2	3	2	2	2	2	2	2	3	3	3	3	3	5	5	5	5	5	4	6	5	5	6	6
Kecskemét	9	9	12	13	14	15	14	15	14	11	8	7	6	9	10	11	12	13	10	13	10	11	9	7	7	7	7	7	8	7
Haladás	2	2	2	3	7	7	9	7	9	9	12	12	14	12	12	10	11	9	9	10	11	12	10	8	10	10	8	8	7	8
Újpest	12	16	14	11	11	12	13	11	8	8	9	10	9	11	8	8	10	11	12	11	8	10	12	11	8	8	9	9	9	9
Diósgyőr	5	7	4	6	6	6	6	6	6	4	4	8	7	8	9	9	7	6	7	7	6	6	8	9	12	11	11	10	10	10
Kaposvári Rákóczi	15	8	10	8	8	8	11	14	13	13	11	9	11	7	6	6	8	10	11	9	12	8	11	12	11	12	12	12	11	11
Pécs	4	4	7	10	9	11	12	10	11	10	10	11	10	10	11	14	14	12	13	12	13	13	13	13	13	13	13	13	13	12
Paks	11	12	11	12	13	10	7	9	10	12	14	14	13	14	14	13	9	7	8	8	9	9	7	10	9	9	10	11	12	13
Pápa	7	11	13	14	15	14	10	12	15	15	13	13	12	13	13	12	13	14	14	14	14	14	14	14	14	14	14	14	14	14
Siófok	13	13	16	16	16	16	16	16	16	16	16	16	16	16	16	16	16	16	16	16	16	16	15	15	15	15	15	15	15	15
Eger	14	14	15	15	12	13	15	13	12	14	15	15	15	15	15	15	15	15	15	15	15	15	16	16	16	16	16	16	16	16

Leader
2013–14 UEFA Europa League First qualifying round
Relegation to 2013–14 Nemzeti Bajnokság II

Updated to match(es) played on 1 June 2013. Source: mlsz.hu (in Hungarian)

== Results ==
Home \ Away	DEB	DIÓ	EGE	FTC	GYŐ	HAL	HON	KEC	MTK	PAK	PÁP	PÉC	RÁK	SIÓ	UTE	VID
Debrecen		2–0	3–0	2–3	4–1	2–0	4–1	2–1	0–2	0–1	1–0	4–1	2–1	4–1	0–1	2–1
Diósgyőr	3–3		1–0	2–2	0–3	1–1	3–1	2–1	2–1	1–0	1–1	1–1	0–1	2–1	2–1	2–1
Eger	1–0	0–1		2–2	2–3	1–2	1–3	0–2	0–3	2–2	1–1	2–3	1–0	1–1	1–2	0–4
Ferencváros	2–1	2–0	4–0		1–1	2–1	0–2	1–1	2–0	2–2	4–1	3–2	2–2	4–2	2–1	0–1
Győr	2–0	2–0	2–1	1–0		1–1	0–0	5–1	1–0	3–4	6–0	1–0	2–1	2–1	3–2	1–1
Haladás	1–0	0–0	4–2	0–0	1–1		1–1	1–1	3–0	1–2	2–1	1–1	0–0	2–1	2–0	0–1
Honvéd	2–2	2–1	3–0	1–0	2–0	1–1		0–0	1–2	3–3	2–0	0–1	5–3	2–0	2–2	0–4
Kecskemét	0–0	1–1	3–1	2–2	5–2	2–1	2–1		1–1	1–1	1–2	0–2	1–2	3–1	1–0	1–5
MTK	3–1	2–0	3–0	4–2	1–3	0–1	1–0	3–1		1–0	2–0	0–0	3–1	1–1	2–1	3–2
Paks	1–2	1–0	0–1	1–3	0–0	0–0	0–3	0–1	0–0		2–0	2–3	1–2	4–1	2–2	1–1
Pápa	1–0	2–2	6–1	0–3	1–1	1–0	2–1	0–2	0–2	0–0		1–2	3–0	0–1	0–1	1–0
Pécs	2–3	2–1	0–0	0–0	0–2	0–2	0–3	0–1	2–1	1–3	2–0		0–2	2–1	1–3	0–0
Kaposvári Rákóczi	1–0	1–1	0–0	1–0	1–2	3–2	1–2	2–3	0–0	1–0	3–0	1–1		3–0	0–0	0–2
Siófok	0–2	3–0	4–3	0–0	2–3	0–3	0–1	0–2	2–1	1–1	1–0	1–0	2–1		0–1	1–3
Újpest	0–0	1–1	3–0	2–1	1–2	0–1	2–4	2–1	1–1	0–6	1–1	4–2	1–0	4–2		0–1
Videoton	3–1	0–0	2–1	1–2	0–1	2–1	0–1	2–0	2–0	2–0	1–1	1–2	2–1	6–0	1–1	

Updated to match(es) played on 2 June 2013. Source: mlsz.hu (in Hungarian)
Legend: Blue = home team win; Yellow = draw; Red = away team win.

== Top goalscorers ==
Including matches played on 1 June 2013; Source: MLSZ

Rank	Scorer	Club	Goals
1	(France) Adamo Coulibaly	Debrecen	18
2	(Hungary) Dániel Böde	Ferencváros	17
3	(Hungary) Péter Kabát	Újpest	13
3	(Hungary) Nemanja Nikolić	Videoton	13
5	(Hungary) Roland Varga	Győr	12
6	(Hungary) Gergely Délczeg	Honvéd	10
6	(Hungary) Attila Simon	Paks (7); Pécs (3)	10
8	(Hungary) János Lázok	Paks	9
8	(Hungary) József Kanta	MTK	9
8	(Serbia) Goran Marić	Pápa	9
8	(Hungary) Norbert Németh	Eger	9

=== Hat-tricks ===
Name	For	Against	Round	Result	Date
(France) Adamo Coulibaly	Debrecen	Pécs	4th	3–2	18 August 2012
(Hungary) Tamás Koltai	Győr	Diósgyőr	6th	3–0	1 September 2012
(Hungary) Attila Simon	Paks	Siófok	7th	4–1	15 September 2012
(Hungary) Patrik Tischler	MTK	Eger	7th	3–0	15 September 2012
(Hungary) Roland Varga	Győr	Pápa	9th	6–0	28 September 2012
(Hungary) Vilmos Melczer	Siófok	Eger	17th	4–3	1 December 2012
(Hungary) János Lázok^{4}	Paks	Újpest	18th	6–0	2 March 2013
(Hungary) Dániel Böde	FTC	Siófok	23rd	4–2	13 April 2013
(France) Adamo Coulibaly	Debrecen	Siófok	25th	4–1	27 April 2013
(Italy) Leandro Martínez	Honvéd	Újpest	27th	4–2	11 May 2013

- ^{4} Player scored 4 goals

== Attendances ==
#	Club	Average
1	Diósgyőr	6,424
2	Ferencváros	6,202
3	Győr	4,585
4	Debrecen	4,295
5	Szombathelyi Haladás	3,317
6	Újpest	3,269
7	Videoton	2,875
8	Kaposvár	2,202
9	Pécs	2,113
10	Kecskemét	2,030
11	Budapest Honvéd	1,939
12	Lombard Pápa	1,697
13	Paks	1,346
14	MTK	1,334
15	Siófok	938
16	Eger	330
