= 2014–15 Nemzeti Bajnokság I =

Nemzeti Bajnokság I
- Season: 2014–15
- Dates: 25 July 2014 – 31 May 2015
- Champions: Videoton (2nd title)
- Relegated: Dunaújváros; Pápa; Győr; Kecskemét; Pécs; Nyíregyháza
- Champions League: Videoton
- Europa League: Ferencváros; MTK; Debrecen
- Matches: 240
- Goals: 586 (2.44 per match)
- Top goalscorer: Nemanja Nikolić (21 goals)
- Biggest home win: Videoton 7–0 Haladás (12 April 2015)
- Biggest away win: Pápa 0–5 Videoton (29 November 2014)
- Highest scoring: Puskás Akadémia 4-5 Újpest (23 May 2015)
- Longest winning run: 10 games by Videoton
- Longest unbeaten run: 20 games by FTC
- Longest winless run: 14 games by Honvéd
- Longest losing run: 8 games by Pécs
- Highest attendance: 21,217 Ferencváros – Újpest
- Lowest attendance: 298 Pécs – Puskás Akadémia
- Total attendance: 591,124
- Average attendance: 2,463
- All statistics correct as of 31 May 2015.

The 2014–15 Nemzeti Bajnokság I, also known as NB I, was the 113th season of top-tier football in Hungary. The league is officially named OTP Bank Liga for sponsorship reasons. The season began 26 July 2014 and concluded on 1 June 2015. Debrecen are the defending champions having won their seventh Hungarian championship last season.

For the first time at a Nemzeti Bajnokság I seasons, match officials used vanishing foam for free kicks. In the Groupama Aréna (FTC) the goal-line technology was used.

Videoton won the league for the second time, under Joan Carillo, finishing 7 points above Ferencváros. The red and blues won all of their first ten league fixtures, and only suffered one defeat at home throughout the season, against defending champions DVSC. Ironically, it was against DVSC who Videoton confirmed their status as champions, defeating Debrecen 2–1 on the 2nd of May.

Ferencváros, were undefeated in their last 20 league games, and were also one of 3 teams to defeat Videoton during the season. FTC achieved their highest finish since getting forcibly relegated in 2006.

== Teams ==
Mezőkövesd and Kaposvár finished the 2013–14 season in the last two places and thus were relegated to their respective NB II divisions.

The two relegated teams were replaced with the champions and the runners-up 2013–14 NB II Nyíregyháza and Dunaújváros. Each of the first two teams in the first division.

=== Stadium and locations ===
Location of teams in 2014–15 Nemzeti Bajnokság I
Location of Budapest teams

Following is the list of clubs competing in 2014–15 Nemzeti Bajnokság I, with their location, stadium and stadium capacity.

Team	Location	Stadium	Capacity
Debrecen	Debrecen	Nagyerdei Stadion	20,340
Diósgyőr	Miskolc	Diósgyőri Stadion	11,398
Dunaújváros	Dunaújváros	Dunaferr Arena	15,000
Ferencváros	Budapest	Groupama Aréna	23,700
Győr	Győr	ETO Park	15,600
Haladás	Szombathely	Rohonci úti Stadion	9,500
Honvéd	Budapest	Bozsik József Stadion	9,500
Kecskemét	Kecskemét	Széktói Stadion	6,320
MTK	Budapest	Bozsik József Stadion	9,500
Nyíregyháza	Nyíregyháza	Városi Stadion	16,500
Paks	Paks	Fehérvári úti Stadion	4,400
Pápa	Pápa	Perutz Stadion	5,500
Pécs	Pécs	PMFC Stadion	7,000
Puskás Akadémia	Felcsút	Pancho Arena	3,000
Újpest	Budapest	Szusza Ferenc Stadion	13,501
Videoton	Székesfehérvár	Sóstói Stadion	14,300

Budapest Honvéd	Debrecen	Diósgyőr	Dunaújváros
Bozsik József Stadion	Nagyerdei Stadion; UEFA Elite Stadium	Diósgyőri Stadion	Dunaferr Arena
Capacity: 9,500	Capacity: 20,340	Capacity: 11,398	Capacity: 15,000
Ferencváros	Győr	Kecskemét	MTK Budapest
Groupama Aréna; UEFA Elite Stadium	ETO Park	Széktói Stadion	Hidegkuti Nándor Stadion
Capacity: 23,700	Capacity: 15,600	Capacity: 6,320	Capacity: 9,500
Nyíregyháza	Paks	Pápa	Pécs
Városi Stadion	Fehérvári úti Stadion	Perutz Stadion	Stadion PMFC
Capacity: 16,500	Capacity: 4,400	Capacity: 5,500	Capacity: 7,000
Puskás Akadémia	Szombathely	Újpest	Videoton
Pancho Arena; UEFA Elite Stadium	Rohonci úti Stadion	Szusza Ferenc Stadion	Sóstói Stadion
Capacity: 3,000	Capacity: 9,500	Capacity: 13,501	Capacity: 14,300

=== Personnel and kits ===
Following is the list of clubs competing in 2014–15 Nemzeti Bajnokság I, with their manager, captain, kit manufacturer and shirt sponsor.
Note: Flags indicate national team as has been defined under FIFA eligibility rules. Players and Managers may hold more than one non-FIFA nationality.

Team	Manager	Captain	Kit manufacturer	Shirt sponsors
Debrecen	(Hungary) Elemér Kondás	(Hungary) Péter Szakály	adidas	Ave
Diósgyőr	(Hungary) Tomislav Sivić	(Hungary) Patrik Bacsa	Nike	Borsodi
Dunaújváros	(Hungary) Barna Dobos	(Hungary) Zoltán Böőr	Nike	Epduferr Zrt.
Ferencváros	(Germany) Thomas Doll	(Hungary) Gábor Gyömbér	Nike	Főtaxi
Győr	(Hungary) Vasile Miriuță	(Hungary) Zoltán Lipták	adidas	Audi
Haladás	(Hungary) Géza Mészöly	(Hungary) Péter Halmosi	Legea	-
Honvéd	(Hungary) József Csábi	(Serbia) Aleksandar Ignjatović	Givova	Ideasport
Kecskemét	(Hungary) Balázs Bekő	(Montenegro) Vladan Savić	Jako	Bertrans Logisztika
MTK	(Hungary) József Garami	(Hungary) József Kanta	Nike	Fotex; Sándor Károly Akadémia
Nyíregyháza	(Hungary) János Mátyus	(Hungary) János Balogh	Jako	-
Paks	(Hungary) Aurél Csertői	(Hungary) Tamás Báló	Jako	MVM Paksi Atomerömü
Pápa	(Hungary) Ferenc Lengyel	(Hungary) Lajos Szűcs	Givova	Lombard
Pécs	(Croatia) Robert Jarni	(Hungary) Levente Lantos	Puma	Matias
Puskás Akadémia	(Hungary) Miklós Benczés	(Hungary) Attila Polonkai	Jako	Mészáros és Mészáros Kft.
Újpest	(Serbia) Nebojša Vignjević	(Hungary) Szabolcs Balajcza	Puma	-
Videoton	(Spain) Joan Carrillo Milán	(Hungary) György Sándor	Nike	MOL Group

==== Managerial changes ====
Team	Outgoing manager	Manner of departure	Date of vacancy	Position in table	Replaced by	Date of appointment
Pápa	(Hungary) János Mátyus	Resigned	4 September 2014	8th	(Hungary) László Kovács	4 September 2014
Honvéd	(Italy) Pietro Vierchowod	Sacked	6 October 2014	11th	(Netherlands) Jasper Adrianus de Muijnck (Caretaker) (Hungary) Miklós Simon (Caretaker)	6 October 2014
Nyíregyháza	(Hungary) József Csábi	Resigned	20 October 2014	14th	(Hungary) János Mátyus	20 October 2014
Haladás	(Hungary) Tamás Artner	Sacked	21 October 2014	15th	(Hungary) Lázár Szentes	21 October 2014
Honvéd	(Netherlands) Jasper Adrianus de Muijnck (Caretaker) (Hungary) Miklós Simon (Caretaker)	End of term	26 October 2014	12th	(Hungary) József Csábi	26 October 2014
Pécs	(Hungary) György Véber	Mutual agreement	27 October 2014	13th	(Hungary) Árpád Kulcsár	27 October 2014
Győr	(Hungary) Ferenc Horváth	Mutual agreement	31 October 2014	8th	a five-membered group, but the decisions taken by (Hungary) Tibor Tokody	31 October 2014
Pápa	(Hungary) László Kovács	Caretaker	10 November 2014	11th	(Hungary) Ferenc Lengyel	10 November 2014
Pécs	(Hungary) Árpád Kulcsár	Caretaker	24 November 2014	15th	(Croatia) Robert Jarni	24 November 2014
Győr	a five-membered group	Caretakers	25 November 2014	9th	(Hungary) Vasile Miriuţă	25 November 2014
Honvéd	(Hungary) József Csábi	Mutual agreement	7 February 2015	13th	(Italy) Marco Rossi	7 February 2015
Dunaújváros PASE	(Hungary) Barna Dobos	He want to load only sports club directors and the post of director	25 March 2015	16th	(Hungary) Tamás Artner	25 March 2015
Haladás	(Hungary) Lázár Szentes	Mutual agreement	20 April 2015	14th	(Hungary) Attila Kuttor	20 April 2015
Pápa	(Hungary) Ferenc Lengyel	Agreement broken	21 April 2015	15th	(Hungary) László Kovács	21 April 2015
Diósgyőri VTK	(Serbia) Tomislav Sivić	Mutual agreement	28 April 2015	8th	(Hungary) Zoltán Vitelki	28 April 2015
Haladás	(Hungary) Attila Kuttor	Caretaker	5 May 2015	14th	(Hungary) Géza Mészöly	5 May 2015

== League table ==
Pos	Team	Pld	W	D	L	GF	GA	GD	Pts	Qualification or relegation
1	Videoton (C)	30	22	5	3	64	14	+50	71	Qualification for Champions League second qualifying round
2	Ferencváros	30	19	7	4	49	19	+30	64	Qualification for Europa League first qualifying round
3	MTK	30	18	3	9	39	25	+14	57	Qualification for Europa League first qualifying round
4	Debrecen	30	15	9	6	44	19	+25	54	Qualification for Europa League first qualifying round
5	Paks	30	14	9	7	44	27	+17	51	
6	Újpest	30	14	9	7	40	28	+12	51	
7	Diósgyőr	30	13	9	8	43	36	+7	48	
8	Győr (R)	30	10	8	12	41	44	−3	38	Relegation to Nemzeti Bajnokság III (Note: Győr won't be a member of 2015–16 Nemzeti Bajnokság I due to financial and licence problems)
9	Kecskemét (R)	30	10	8	12	30	39	−9	38	Dissolved - Kecskeméti LC KTE SI in the Bács-Kiskun County Football League One as successor (Note: Kecskemét, Nyíregyháza and Pécs won't be members of 2015–16 Nemzeti Bajnokság I due to licence problems)
10	Puskás Akadémia	30	10	5	15	35	40	−5	35	
11	Pécs (R)	30	8	7	15	32	51	−19	31	Relegation to Baranya County Football League One
12	Nyíregyháza (R)	30	8	6	16	33	49	−16	30	Relegation to Nemzeti Bajnokság III
13	Honvéd	30	6	10	14	26	36	−10	28	
14	Haladás	30	7	4	19	26	53	−27	25	
15	Dunaújváros (Note: Dunaújváros deducted 1 point) (R)	30	5	8	17	26	49	−23	22	Relegation to Nemzeti Bajnokság II
16	Pápa (R)	30	4	7	19	14	57	−43	19	Dissolved - Pápai PFC in the Veszprém County Football League One as successor

Source: mlsz.hu (in Hungarian)
Rules for classification: 1st points; 2nd overall wins; 3rd goal difference; 4th head-to-head points; 5th head-to-head goal difference; 6th head-to-head away goals scored; 7th fair-play points; 8th drawing of lots
(C) Champions; (R) Relegated

=== Positions by round ===
On 7th round, one match has been abandoned and one match has been cancelled. They were played on 22 October.

Team ╲ Round	1	2	3	4	5	6	7	8	9	10	11	12	13	14	15	16	17	18	19	20	21	22	23	24	25	26	27	28	29	30
Videoton	2	1	2	1	1	1	1	1	1	1	1	1	1	1	1	1	1	1	1	1	1	1	1	1	1	1	1	1	1	1
Ferencváros	4	7	9	7	3	4	2	4	5	6	5	6	6	6	6	5	5	4	3	3	3	3	2	2	2	2	2	2	2	2
MTK	1	2	4	4	5	5	3	2	2	2	2	2	2	2	2	2	2	2	2	2	2	2	3	3	3	3	3	3	3	3
Debrecen	8	12	7	8	8	7	8	9	10	7	7	7	7	7	5	4	4	3	4	4	4	4	4	4	4	4	4	4	4	4
Paks	5	2	1	2	4	2	4	5	3	4	3	3	4	3	4	7	6	6	6	5	6	5	5	5	5	5	5	5	5	5
Újpest	7	5	6	5	6	6	7	6	6	5	6	5	3	5	7	6	7	7	7	8	8	8	8	8	7	6	6	6	6	6
Diósgyőr	6	4	3	3	2	3	5	3	4	3	4	4	5	4	3	3	3	5	5	6	7	7	7	7	8	7	7	7	7	7
Győr	13	8	11	11	10	9	11	7	7	10	9	8	9	8	9	10	9	10	10	10	9	9	10	10	10	10	9	9	8	8
Kecskemét	12	15	15	16	16	12	13	13	12	8	10	9	8	9	8	8	10	8	8	7	5	6	6	6	6	8	8	8	9	9
Puskás Akadémia	10	11	14	14	14	15	16	14	13	9	8	10	10	10	10	9	8	9	9	9	10	10	9	9	9	9	10	10	10	10
Pécs	16	14	13	13	13	14	12	12	9	12	12	13	14	14	15	15	16	14	13	13	14	13	14	12	12	12	12	12	12	11
Nyíregyháza	9	13	8	10	12	11	9	10	14	14	14	14	12	12	11	11	11	11	11	11	11	11	11	11	11	11	11	11	11	12
Honvéd	3	6	10	12	9	10	6	8	8	11	11	12	13	13	13	13	13	13	14	15	15	12	12	13	13	13	13	13	13	13
Haladás	11	9	12	9	11	13	14	15	15	15	15	15	16	16	16	16	15	16	16	14	12	14	13	14	14	15	15	14	14	14
Dunaújváros	15	16	16	15	15	16	15	16	16	16	16	16	15	15	14	14	14	15	15	16	16	16	16	16	16	14	14	15	15	15
Pápa	14	10	5	6	7	8	10	11	11	13	13	11	11	11	12	12	12	12	12	12	13	15	15	15	15	16	16	16	16	16

Updated to match(es) played on 31 May 2015. Source: mlsz.hu (in Hungarian)
= Leader; = 2015–16 UEFA Europa League First qualifying round; = Relegation to 2015–16 Nemzeti Bajnokság II

== Results ==
Home \ Away	DEB	DIÓ	DUN	FTC	GYŐ	HAL	HON	KEC	MTK	NYÍ	PAK	PÁP	PÉC	PUS	UTE	VID
Debrecen		1–0	2–0	2–2	5–0	1–0	4–0	0–0	2–1	5–0	2–0	4–0	0–2	2–0	0–0	1–2
Diósgyőr	1–1		3–3	2–1	4–1	3–0	2–1	2–1	1–0	2–1	1–2	2–1	2–2	2–1	2–1	1–2
Dunaújváros	0–0	0–0		0–1	0–2	1–0	0–0	0–2	0–0	3–0	1–0	1–1	3–2	2–3	1–3	1–4
Ferencváros	1–1	3–0	2–0		3–0	0–0	1–0	3–1	2–0	3–1	0–0	2–0	2–0	2–1	2–0	2–0
Győr	0–1	1–1	4–3	0–1		3–2	3–1	1–1	1–2	2–3	2–2	0–0	3–0	1–0	0–0	2–2
Haladás	2–0	1–1	1–4	0–3	0–2		1–3	3–1	0–3	3–1	1–3	2–0	1–1	3–0	0–1	0–2
Honvéd	1–1	1–1	3–0	2–3	0–2	2–0		2–0	0–2	0–1	0–0	2–0	1–2	1–0	2–2	1–1
Kecskemét	1–2	2–1	0–0	1–3	1–1	0–1	1–0		0–1	1–0	1–1	3–2	1–0	2–1	2–0	0–0
MTK	1–0	0–2	2–0	2–1	2–1	2–0	2–0	0–0		2–0	3–1	3–0	3–2	1–0	0–1	0–1
Nyíregyháza	1–1	1–2	0–0	0–0	2–3	2–0	2–0	1–1	1–1		0–3	3–0	4–0	0–1	2–4	0–2
Paks	2–1	3–1	2–1	0–1	2–0	1–2	0–0	2–3	3–0	1–1		3–0	2–0	2–1	0–0	1–0
Pápa	0–2	0–0	1–0	1–0	0–0	2–2	1–1	3–2	0–1	0–1	0–4		0–2	0–1	0–0	0–5
Pécs	0–0	1–2	2–0	2–2	0–3	2–1	2–1	1–2	0–4	2–1	1–1	1–2		0–1	1–1	0–2
Puskás Akadémia	0–1	1–0	3–2	1–2	2–1	1–0	1–1	4–0	0–1	1–2	1–1	3–0	2–2		4–5	0–0
Újpest	1–0	1–1	3–0	2–1	1–0	1–0	0–0	3–0	1–0	3–2	1–2	4–0	0–2	1–1		0–1
Videoton	1–2	2–1	3–0	0–0	3–2	7–0	1–0	1–0	5–0	3–0	2–0	3–0	4–0	3–0	2–0	

Source: mlsz.hu (in Hungarian)
Legend: Blue = home team win; Yellow = draw; Red = away team win.

== Top goalscorers ==
Rank	Player	Club	Goals
1	(Hungary) Nemanja Nikolić	Videoton	21
2	(Hungary) Patrik Tischler	Puskás	15
3	(Hungary) Dániel Böde	Ferencváros	13
4	(Hungary) Tamás Priskin	Győr	11
5	(Hungary) Norbert Könyves	Paks	10
6	(Senegal) Bebeto	Kecskemét	9
6	(Hungary) László Lencse	Puskás	9
6	(Hungary) László Pekár	Nyíregyháza	9
6	(Ivory Coast) Souleymane Youla	Honvéd	9
10	(Hungary) László Bartha	Paks	8
10	(Hungary) József Kanta	MTK Budapest	8
10	(Argentina) Leandro Martínez	Győr (2); Haladás (6)	8

Updated to games played on 31 May 2015

== Hat-tricks ==
Name	For	Against	Round	Result	Date
(Hungary) Dániel Böde	Ferencváros	Kecskemét	1st	3–1	27 July 2014
(Hungary) Máté Pátkai	Győr	Dunaújváros	6th	4–3	31 August 2014
(Hungary) László Lencse	Puskás Akadémia	Dunaújváros	24th	3–2	18 April 2015
(Hungary) Patrik Tischler	Puskás Akadémia	Kecskemét	28th	4–0	15 May 2015
(Hungary) Patrik Tischler*	Puskás Akadémia	Újpest	29th	4–5	23 May 2015
(Hungary) Ádám Bódi	Debrecen	Győr	30th	5–0	31 May 2015

- Four goals

== Best players ==
Hivatásos Labdarúgók Szervezete (Professional Footballers Association) chose the best players of this season.

- The best outfielder player (Albert Flórián's challenge cup): Zoltán Gera (FTC)
- The best goalkeeper (Zsiborás Gábor's challenge cup): Dénes Dibusz (FTC)
- The best player under-21: Dávid Márkvárt (Pécs)
- The best manager: Joan Carrillo (Videoton FC)
- The best referee: Viktor Kassai

After the season Magyar Labdarúgó Szövetség chose the best players of this season.

- The best player: Nemanja Nikolić (Videoton FC)
- The best discovered player of this season: Miklós Kitl (Kecskemét)
- The best manager: Joan Carrillo (Videoton FC)
- The best referee: Péter Solymosi
- Fair Play: MTK Budapest FC
- The best Hungarian player (Audience Award): Ádám Bódi (DVSC)
- The most aesthetically significant, or "most beautiful", goal of NB1 (Audience Award): József Varga (DVSC)

== Attendances ==
#	Club	Average attendance
1	Ferencváros	8,532
2	Diósgyőr	4,279
3	Debrecen	3,791
4	Videoton	3,045
5	Győr	2,837
6	Nyíregyháza Spartacus	2,726
7	Újpest	2,378
8	Szombathelyi Haladás	2,218
9	Puskás	1,563
10	Kecskemét	1,528
11	Paks	1,504
12	Pécs	1,472
13	Dunaújváros	1,378
14	Lombard Pápa	1,093
15	Honvéd	956
16	MTK	729
