= Bálint Tóth (footballer) =

Hungarian football manager (born 1950)

Personal information
- Full name: Bálint István Tóth
- Date of birth: 11 February 1950 (age 76)
- Place of birth: Budapest, Hungary
- Positions: Forward; midfielder

Youth career
- 1961–1967: Vasas

Senior career*
Years	Team	Apps	(Gls)
1968–1975	Vasas	84	(19)
1975–1978	Csepel	40	(3)
1978–1980	Budafok		
1985–1990	UFC Pama		
Total		124	(22)

Managerial career
- 1986–1990: UFC Pama
- 1993: Vasas
- 1994: Vasas
- 1998–1999: Tatabánya
- 1999–2000: Rákospalota
- 2000: Siófok
- 2002: Pécs
- 2004: Haladás
- 2004–2005: Pápa
- 2008–2009: Budafok
- 2010–2011: ESMTK
- 2012: Szeged
- 2013–2014: Pápa
- 2015: Rákosmente
- 2017: Budafok
- 2018: Budafok
- * Club domestic league appearances and goals

Bálint István Tóth (born 11 February 1950) is a Hungarian former professional football manager and player who played as a forward and midfielder.

== Club career ==
Tóth joined Vasas in March 1961 and progressed through the club's youth system under the guidance of Ferenc Machos before being promoted to the reserve team. From 1967, he trained with the first team, making his senior debut in 1968 at the age of 18.

A forward and midfielder, Tóth played for Vasas between 1964 and 1975, making 84 league appearances and scoring 19 goals, before joining Csepel in 1975. He made 40 league appearances and scored three goals for Csepel between 1975 and 1978.

During his time at Vasas, Tóth won the Mitropa Cup in 1970, as well as the Magyar Kupa in 1973, and also finished as a runner-up and third-place finisher in the Nemzeti Bajnokság I.

== Managerial career ==
=== Budafok ===
In July 2008, Tóth was appointed manager of Nemzeti Bajnokság III Duna Group club Budafok, replacing Károly Gelei, who remained at the club as managing director. He accepted the club's focus on youth development and expressed his ambition of guiding the team to Nemzeti Bajnokság II within a few years. On 18 July 2009, he left the club after the departure of its sponsors, with both the manager and several players deciding not to remain.

=== ESMTK ===
On 17 July 2010, Tóth was appointed manager of Nemzeti Bajnokság III Alföld Group club ESMTK, replacing Joel Geraldo Agonglo after the club had finished third in the league. On 22 March 2011, he left the club by mutual consent after the team collected one point from its opening three spring league matches despite occupying third place in the Duna Group.

=== Szeged ===
On 11 April 2012, Tóth was appointed manager of Nemzeti Bajnokság II club Szeged following the resignation of Tamás Futó. He initially agreed to remain in charge until the end of the season. On 22 October, he was dismissed following a seven-match winless run. During his spell, he secured the club's place in the division at the end of the previous season.

=== Return to Pápa ===
On 27 May 2013, Tóth returned as manager of Nemzeti Bajnokság I club Pápa, replacing caretaker manager László Kovács, who resumed his role as goalkeeping coach. He was appointed on an indefinite contract ahead of the club's final league match of the season. On 6 May 2014, he was replaced by Mihály Nagy. During his tenure, he helped the club avoid relegation at the end of the 2012–13 season and led the team to practical safety in the following campaign before his departure.

=== Rákosmente ===
On 30 June 2015, Tóth was appointed manager of Nemzeti Bajnokság III West Group club Rákosmente, succeeding István Gálvölgyi after the club had finished fourth in the league.

=== Return to Budafok ===
On 17 October 2017, Tóth returned as manager of Nemzeti Bajnokság II club Budafok after the departure of László Prukner. His initial contract ran until the end of December 2017. On 12 December, he was replaced by György Gálhidi.

On 24 April 2018, Tóth was reappointed manager of the club following the departure of György Gálhidi. He signed a contract until the end of the season with the objective of keeping Budafok in the division. In June, he left the club and was succeeded by Zoltán Vitelki.

== Managerial statistics ==
Managerial record by team and tenure
Team	From	To	Record								Ref
Team	From	To	P	W	D	L	GF	GA	GD	Win %	Ref
Vasas	April 1993	June 1993	10	1	5	4	9	12	−3	10.00	
Vasas	July 1994	November 1994	23	9	4	10	47	35	+12	39.13	
Tatabánya	24 March 1998	17 June 1999	59	40	10	9	141	72	+69	67.80	
Rákospalota	September 1999	16 April 2000	17	3	2	12	22	44	−22	17.65	
Siófok	18 April 2000	June 2000	6	1	2	3	5	8	−3	16.67	
Pécs	March 2002	15 April 2002	7	3	1	3	11	15	−4	42.86	
Haladás	22 March 2004	July 2004	15	2	5	8	10	29	−19	13.33	
Pápa	July 2004	17 March 2005	20	5	5	10	28	32	−4	25.00	
Budafok	July 2008	18 July 2009	30	17	3	10	46	30	+16	56.67	
ESMTK	17 July 2010	22 March 2011	18	9	4	5	37	22	+15	50.00	
Szeged	11 April 2012	22 October 2012	19	7	6	6	35	30	+5	36.84	
Pápa	27 May 2013	6 May 2014	43	15	12	16	58	67	−9	34.88	
Rákosmente	30 June 2015	August 2015	4	2	1	1	6	4	+2	50.00	
Budafok	17 October 2017	12 December 2017	10	3	2	5	11	15	−4	30.00	
Budafok	24 April 2018	19 June 2018	7	5	0	2	12	10	+2	71.43	
Total			288	122	62	104	478	425	+53	42.36	

== Honours ==
=== Player ===
Vasas

- Magyar Kupa: 1972–73
- Mitropa Cup: 1969–70

=== Manager ===
Tatabánya

- Nemzeti Bajnokság II: 1998–99
- Magyar Kupa runner-up: 1998–99
