= István Eszlátyi =

Hungarian footballer

Personal information
- Full name: István Eszlátyi
- Date of birth: 24 February 1991 (age 35)
- Place of birth: Bonyhád, Hungary
- Height: 1.83 m (6 ft 0 in)
- Position: Winger

Team information
- Current team: Komárom
- Number: 7

Youth career
- 2003–2004: Tevel
- 2004–2005: Bonyhád
- 2005–2008: Szekszárd
- 2006–2008: → MTK (loan)

Senior career*
Years	Team	Apps	(Gls)
2008–2009	Barcs	10	(1)
2009–2012	Pécs	10	(1)
2011	→ Kozármisleny (loan)	11	(0)
2012	→ BKV Előre (loan)	14	(6)
2012–2013	BKV Előre	27	(12)
2013–2014	Pápa	23	(2)
2014–2015	Soproni VSE	27	(10)
2015–2016	Kisvárda	17	(1)
2016–2017	Soproni VSE	35	(8)
2017–2018	Békéscsaba	9	(0)
2018	→ Mosonmagyaróvári TE (loan)	13	(6)
2018–2019	Mosonmagyaróvári TE	31	(3)
2019–2020	Haladás	15	(2)
2020–	Komárom	18	(5)
- * Club domestic league appearances and goals as of 20:38, 20 February 2021 (UTC)

István Eszlátyi (born 24 February 1991) is a Hungarian football player who plays for Komárom.
