= Márk Orosz =

Hungarian footballer

Personal information
- Date of birth: 24 October 1989 (age 37)
- Place of birth: Kecskemét, Hungary
- Height: 1.80 m (5 ft 11 in)
- Position: Midfielder

Youth career
- 2003–2004: Kecskemét
- 2004–2007: Ferencváros
- 2007–2009: Crotone

Senior career*
Years	Team	Apps	(Gls)
2009	Crotone	8	(0)
2009–2010	Arezzo	1	(0)
2010	→ Catanzaro (loan)	8	(0)
2010–2011	Pro Cavese	5	(0)
2011–2012	Szeged	22	(15)
2012–2014	Ferencváros	20	(1)
2013–2014	→ Pápa (loan)	20	(3)
2014–2016	Dunaújváros	30	(3)
2016–2017	Mezőkövesdi SE	14	(0)
2017–2021	Soroksár	90	(18)
2021–2022	Ajka	9	(0)
- * Club domestic league appearances and goals as of 13 February 2022

Márk Orosz (born 24 October 1989) is a Hungarian football player. He played his first league match in 2012.

== Honours ==
Ferencváros

- Hungarian League Cup (1): 2012–13
