= Zoltán Venczel =

Hungarian footballer

Personal information
- Full name: Zoltán Venczel
- Date of birth: 9 July 1994 (age 32)
- Place of birth: Pápa, Hungary
- Position: Midfielder

Team information
- Current team: Pápa
- Number: 53

Youth career
- 2005–2014: Pápa

Senior career*
Years	Team	Apps	(Gls)
2014–	Pápa	1	(0)
- * Club domestic league appearances and goals as of 18 May 2014

Zoltán Venczel (born 9 July 1994) is a Hungarian professional footballer who plays for Lombard-Pápa TFC.
