= Budapest derby =

Football rivalry in Budapest, Hungary

The Derby of Budapest (Hungarian: Budapesti derbi) is major football rivalry between Ferencvárosi TC and Újpest FC; however, other clubs from Budapest are also included such as Budapest Honvéd FC, Vasas SC, and MTK Budapest FC. Traditionally the Ferencváros - MTK rivalry was the most prestigious fixture but this has since been replaced by Ferencváros - Újpest.

== Overview ==
=== 1901-1930: The dual dominance of Ferencváros & MTK ===
From the onset of professional football in Hungary, it has always been mostly dominated by teams from Budapest. The inaugural season of the Hungarian football league in 1901 was won by the now defunct Budapesti TC. In 1903 Ferencváros would win their first national championship, and MTK followed suit the next year. For the next three decades, these two clubs would exert utter dominance over the silverware, winning all league-titles between 1904 and 1930 between themselves. Due to the two clubs' proximity, opposition in ideology, and their complete dominance of the league in its first four decades of existence, FTC and MTK would embark on a fierce rivalry with one another, known as Örökrangadó.

In 1911 Ferencváros became the first team to win the championship three consecutive times. By 1913 they had won their fifth straight league-title, a new Hungarian record. Between 1916 and 1925 MTK won the national championship 9 consecutive times.

=== 1930-1950: The emergence of Újpest, Csepel's first titles ===
1930 marked the first season that Újpest were crowned champions of Hungary. This was the first time in 26 years that a club other than the "big two" of FTC and MTK won the league-title. By this point MTK had won 14 national championships, while FTC had 13. During the 1930s the dominance of both clubs who had been dominating the league up to that point was challenged by Újpest. The 4th district club defeated Ferencváros in April 1931 and would go on to win 5 titles throughout the decade.

In 1932 Ferencváros won the league with a 100% win percentage, as they managed to win all 22 of their games, and outscored their opponents 105 to 18.

In 1940 MTK disbanded due to the club's Jewish affiliation, as restrictions on people of Jewish ethnicity were becoming gradually more strict in the Kingdom of Hungary.

In 1941 FTC overtook MTK as the most decorated Hungarian club, after winning their 16th league-title.

In 1942 and '43 Weisz Manfréd FC Csepel won back-to-back national titles, as they became the fourth Budapest-based team to acquire silverware. In 1944 Nagyváradi AC became the first non-Budapest club to become national champions. In 1945 MTK were founded again.

In 1945 the professional league returned after a one-year hiatus, and Újpest won the first of what would eventually be a three-peat of championships.

=== 1950-1969: The emergence of Honvéd & Vasas, politicization of domestic football ===
the 1950s saw drastic changes in the Hungarian league, both on and off the pitch. As the country was placed under Soviet sphere of influence, football and politics became very much intertwined. Certain clubs were forced to become teams of specific branches of government, and were thus favoured. Újpest became Dózsa SE, and were now the team of the ministry of interior, while Budapest Honvéd, who up to that point had been known as Kispesti AC, became the team of the ministry of defense. On the other hand, Ferencváros were stripped of their green and white colours, and were forced to change their name to Édosz SE.

Budapest Honvéd won their first championship in 1950, and were a force to be reckoned with throughout the entire decade. In 1952 the team of the 19th district became the first team since MTK in 1936 to win the league undefeated. In 1953 the Népstadion was inaugurated. The first Budapest-Derbies taking place in it were Újpest-Csepel and MTK-Ferencváros in August 1953. The Stadium would be home to many Budapest Derbies over the following decades, some of them being held on the same day in the form of a "double-derby". In 1956 Honvéd completed their first three-peat, winning their fifth overall national championship. In 1957 Vasas won their first ever national title, finishing 1 point above MTK. In 1958 MTK won their 18th league-title, and became the record-champions, albeit for a few years only. In 1959 Csepel won their fourth, and to this day last national championship, finishing level on points with MTK. The 1950s was the only decade where neither part of the Ferencváros-Újpest duo won a single national championship.

In 1960 Újpest ended their 13-year league title drought, and won the league. In 1961 Vasas won another national championship, and managed to retain their title the following season. In 1963 Győri-ETO became the second team outside of Budapest after Nagyváradi AC, and the first team from the Western part of the country to become national champions under head coach Gyula Noszkay. In 1964 Ferencváros once again overtook MTK in terms of national titles, as they won their 18th championship, and their first since 1948. Ferencváros have held onto their privilege of record champions ever since. In 1965 Vasas won their fourth league-title, and also managed to retain their title the following season, doing so undefeated. In 1967 Ferencváros became the first Hungarian team to win 20 league titles. They managed to defend their championship in the subsequent season.

=== 1969-1980: The Magical Újpest era ===
In 1969 Újpest won their first championship in 9 years, preventing Ferencváros from achieving a three-peat.

During the first half of the 1970s Újpest dominated Hungarian domestic football largely thanks to coach Lajos Baróti in an unparalleled way. The purple and whites won seven consecutive league-titles, closing the gap between their and FTC's trophy-cabinet.

In 1971 Újpest won their third consecutive championship, becoming the first team of the post-war era to achieve two three-peats. Their only home defeat of the campaign came against Ferencváros.

The following season the 4th districtians claimed another league trophy, becoming the first team to win four consecutive titles since MTK in the 1920s.

Újpest retained their title in 1973 and 1974 becoming the first Hungarian team to achieve back-to-back three-peats in the cold war-era. In 1974 Ferencváros' stadium at Üllői Út was inaugurated.

In 1975, the purple and whites won a record seventh consecutive championship.

In 1976 Ferencváros managed to break Újpest's hegemony in the league, as the green and whites won their first league-title since 1968.

In 1977 Vasas won their sixth national championship, tying Budapest Honvéd in league-titles, while scoring 100 goals in the season.

Újpest closed out the decade with another two subsequent national titles, becoming the first and to this day only Hungarian club to win 8 national titles within a single decade. By 1980, the two juggernauts of Budapest, Ferencváros and UTE were separated by only four titles in the all-time ranking.

=== 1980-1990: Honvéd's second heyday & MTK's return ===
In 1980 Honvéd ended their quarter of a century long national title-drought, after winning the league, preventing Újpest from achieving their fourth three-peat. The red and black team would experience somewhat of a resurgence in the 1980s, as they reached heights similar to that in their heyday in the 1950s.

The 1982 and 1983 seasons were the first consecutive campaigns in the league's history in which a non-Budapest team won the league, namely Győri-ETO under masterclass coach Oszkár Szigeti.

In 1984 Honvéd overtook Vasas in the number of national titles, as they claimed their seventh league trophy, and would go on to successfully defend it in 1985. In 1986 Honvéd retained their title for a second time, and became the first team of the decade to achieve a three-peat. In 1987 MTK ended their 29-year long title-drought as the white and blues finished 2 points above Újpest, and won the league. In 1988 Honvéd won their tenth national title, and retained it in 1989, for their seventh league title of the decade.

Although not completely devoid of silverware, as Ferencváros won the league in 1981, the 1980s saw the two most popular clubs of the capital, FTC and UTE struggle in the championship. The 1984/85 campaign was especially notable for the two teams' below-expectations finishes, as both clubs achieved their worst ever league-position finishes up to that point. Ferencváros finished 12th, while Újpest finished 10th, and the following season they ended the table at the 11th spot.

=== 1990-2004: FTC, MTK & UTE are rampant again ===
In 1990 Újpest ended their 11-year wait for a league trophy. The purple and whites won the league on the last day of the season, defeating Budapest Honvéd 2-0.

In 1994 Vác became the first team from Pest county beyond Budapest to win the league, under future headcoach of the national team János Csank.

Ferencváros would win three championships over the decade. The green and white were victorious in 1992, 1995 and 1996, however, their three-peat attempt was thwarted by MTK. The white and blues won the league in 1997 and 1999, both campaigns with an 80+point tally. Both seasons are amongs the top two highest ever point tallies achieved in the hungarian top-flight over a single season.

In 1998 Újpest won their twentieth, and most recent championship to this day, finishing 6 points above Ferencváros.

=== 2004 - 2016: Budapest's dominance is halted ===
In the 21st century, the tight grip that the trio of FTC, MTK & UTE, and Budapest-based teams altogether had on Hungarian football was slightly loosened. 4 teams won the league for the first time in the 2000s and 2010s, and all four of them were provincial teams outside of Budapest. Big teams succumbed to relegation, some of them for the first time in their history. Such as Honvéd in 2003, Vasas also in 2003, Ferencváros in 2006 due to not getting a 1st Division license, and MTK in 2011.

Between 2004 and 2016, all but one Hungarian champions were teams outside of Budapest, and Pest county all-together for the first time in history.

In 2008 MTK won their most recent championship, breaking DVSC's hegemony in the championship, who had won the previous three editions, becoming the first non-Budapest team to complete a three-peat.

In August 2008 Újpest contested their 2723rd fixture in the top-flight, overtaking Ferencváros in the most number of 1st Division games played.

=== 2016- : Honvéd title after 24 years and a 3-star Ferencváros ===
In 2016 Ferencváros won their first championship in 12 years in a now reduced 1st Division of 12 teams.

In 2017 Honvéd won their first championship title after 24 years of waiting.

In 2019 Ferencváros won their thirtieth 1st Division title, adding a third star to their crest. The green and whites have won every single championship since, winning six consecutive national titles as of 2024. In 2021 and 2022 Ferencváros confirmed their status as champions of the league against their biggest rivals, Újpest.

The city of Budapest has won 106 national championships since the top-flight's inception in 1901.

== History and rival culture ==
=== Ferencváros and Újpest rivalry ===
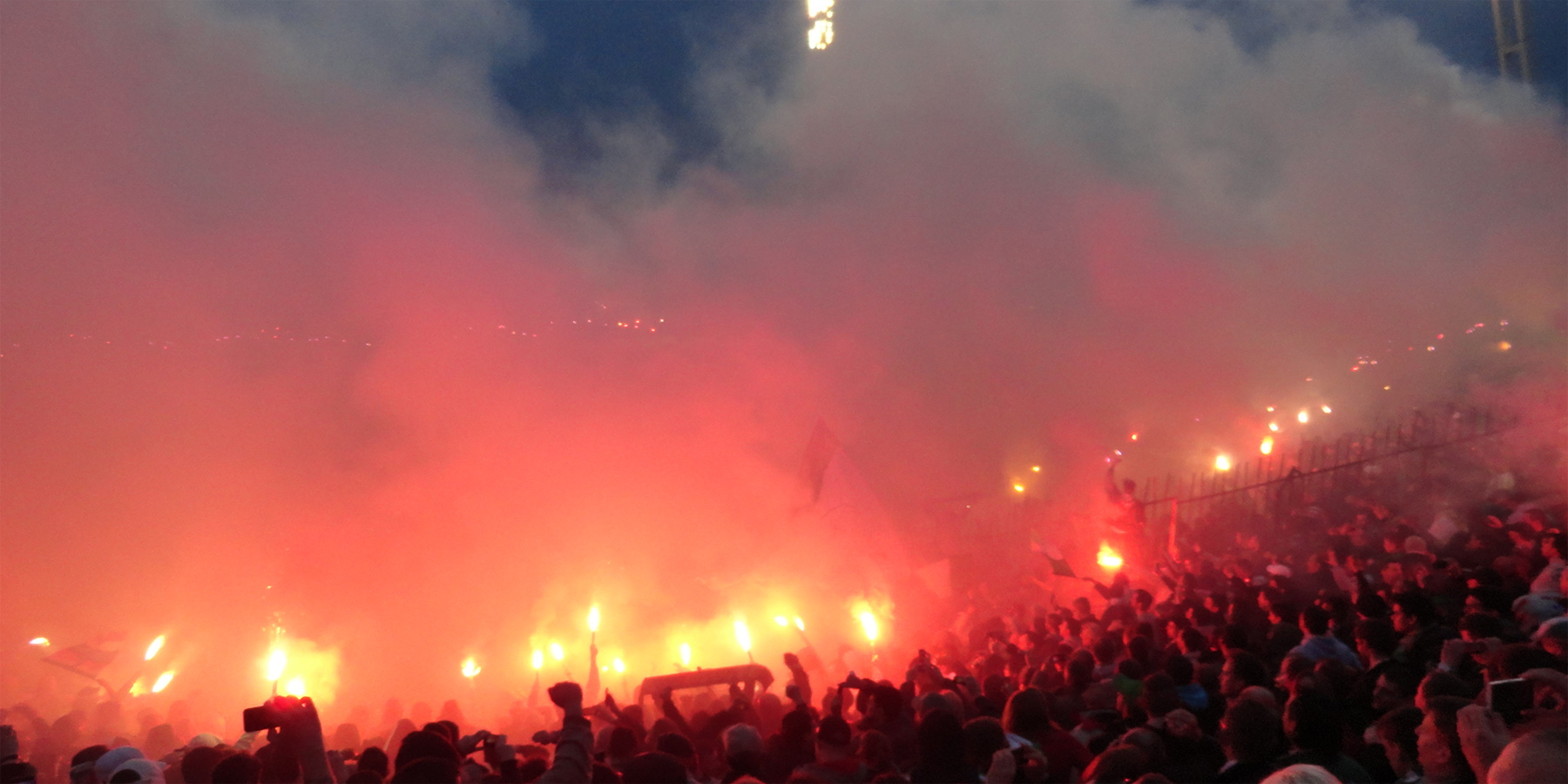
Ferencváros-Újpest derby in the Hungarian league at the Albert Stadion on 10 March 2013

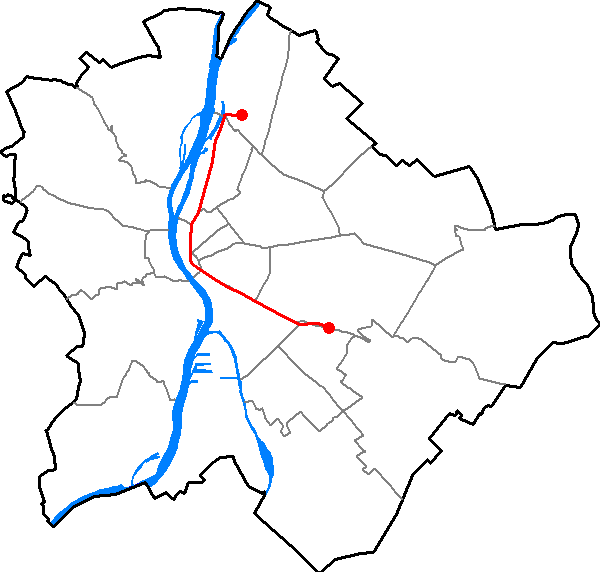
The route of the two supporters of Újpest FC and Ferencvárosi TC

The rivalry between Ferencvárosi TC and Újpest FC is considered one of the most important fixtures in the Hungarian League. No matter what the position of the club is in the championship the stadium is packed. The rivalry started in the 1930s when Újpest won their first Hungarian League title. By this time, Ferencváros had 11 championships, and were the second biggest team in the country, behind MTK. The district of Újpest became part of Budapest only in the 1950s. Therefore, the rivalry is based on a city-rural contrast. The supporters of Ferencváros were Germans in Hungary and city-dwellers, while the supporters of Újpest were Hungarians, Germans, and Jews in Hungary. Since then the two clubs have been competing head to head; however, in the 2000s both clubs were close to bankruptcy which seriously affected their performance in the Hungarian League. Both clubs named their stadium after their iconic figures (Flórián Albert and Ferenc Szusza).

In the 1950s Ferencváros became the team of the opposition, were stripped of their green and white colours, and forcibly changed their name to Budapest Kinizsi. Meanwhile, Újpest were forced to become the team of the Ministry of Interior, and were known for the entirety of the Communist era in Hungary, as Újpesti Dózsa (corresponding to Dynamo in the Soviet bloc). Therefore, Ferencváros fans consider Újpest as the Soviet invaders. Ferencváros reinstalled their official crest and colours during the 1956 Hungarian Revolution.

In 1960, Újpest ended their 13-year long league title drought, as the purple and whites finished 5 points above runners-up Ferencváros. In 1963, it was FTC who won their first league title since 1949, after finishing 6 points above MTK, and 7 points above Újpest. In 1964, Újpest beat Ferencváros 4‐2 in the highest ever attended game between the two, with 85,000 people cramming into the Népstadion. Ferencváros became the first Hungarian team to win a continental cup, winning the 1965 Inter-Cities Fairs Cup. Újpest would attempt to recreate this feat in 1969, but ultimately lost in the final, against Newcastle United. 1969 would be the start of the Magical Újpest era, with the purples from the capital winning the national championship 7 consecutive times. In 1969, Újpest won both the league and the Hungarian cup.

In 1971, the purple and whites won their third consecutive league title, after finishing 2 points above Ferencváros. In 1973 the league trophy returned to the Megyeri út for the fifth consecutive season. Ferencváros finished second, being 5 points away from their arch rivals. In 1974, the two teams again finished in the top 2 spots, with Újpest winning the league, 3 points above Ferencváros. In 1976, FTC finally managed to finish above Újpest, who achieved a bronze-medal and won their first league title since 1968. In spite of this, Újpest beat Ferencváros 3-8 that season at the Népstadion, which was their largest margin of victory in the history of the derby up to that point. In 1977, both teams were within reach of another league-title, but had to watch, as it was another club from the capital, Vasas, who ended up champions. Also in 1977, the biggest rivals of Pest met in the Hungarian cup final, with Ferencváros beating Újpest 3‐2, after being in front 3 times. This was the first time in 43 years, that Ferencváros and Újpest encountered each other in a cup final. In 1979, Újpest won their 9th national championships of the decade, after finishing 3 points above the green and whites. During the season, Ferencváros sought revenge for the 3–8 loss they had suffered 3 years prior, and beat Újpest 7‐1.

In October 1980, Újpest defeated FTC 0‐3 in the 9th district. This is the highest ever attended game at Üllői út, with 35,000 people being present. In 1981, Ferencváros won their 23rd First Division title, while Újpest finished 8th, their worst since 1955. In 1982, Ferencváros defeated Újpest 5‐0, after a hat-trick from László Szokolai. Both teams had a regression of form, and achieved their worst-ever league positions up to that point. In 1985, FTC finished 13th, while Újpest finished 11th in 1986. Ferencváros spent 5 consecutive seasons outside the top 3, however, Újpest achieved a bronze and a silver medal, and came within 3 points of winning the championship in 1987. In 1989, Ferencváros were close to winning the 1st Division, but came up just short of Budapest Honvéd.

In 1990, Újpest and MTK finished on equal points, with Ferencváros finishing 3rd. Due to their better head-to-head record in the season, Újpest claimed their first league title in 10 years. In 1992, Ferencváros finished 1 point above Vác, and won their first championship since 1981. The two sides met in the 1992 Hungarian Supercup, where Újpest got the best of their rivals, defeating them 3–1, in no small part thanks to Dénes Eszenyi, who scored a brace in 15 minutes. This was the first, and still only time, when Újpest defeated Ferencváros in a final. In may of 1994, Újpest overcame FTC 1‐0 after István Kozma converted a penalty to give the purple and whites their first win at Üllői Út in 10 years. In 1995, Ferencváros won the league, after finishing 7 points above Újpest, and retained their title in the following season. In 1997 Újpest finished runners-up, while Ferencváros achieved a bronze-medal finish. In 1998, Újpest won the 1st Division, under the guidance of Péter Várhidi, while Ferencváros finished 2nd place, 6 points behind the purple and whites.This has been Újpest's last national championship, as they have been unable to reclaim it ever since. In 1999 Újpest finished runners-up, 1 point above 3rd placed Ferencváros.

In 2001, Ferencváros won the league in a now reduced 1st Division of 12 teams. In 2004, the 9th districtian green and whites won another league-title, finishing 1 point above Újpest. In 2006, Ferencváros were relegated to the 2nd Division, due to not being given a 1st Division license for the first time in their history. After a 3-year hiatus, the derby was held again, in October 2009, with Újpest defeating Ferencváros 2–1, due to an '88 minute strike from Rajczi.

In September 2010, Újpest defeated Ferencváros 6–0, their highest ever win of margin against the greens. In April 2011, Ferencváros ended their 7-year winless run against Újpest, by defeating them 1–0 at the Üllői Út. In March 2013, Ferencváros bid farewell to their long-time home, Albert Flórián stadium, with a 2–1 win over Újpest. In September 2014, Újpest recorded what remains their most recent home win over Ferencváros, thanks to a goal from Simon in the '72nd minute, making it 2–1. in December 2015, Újpest defeated Ferencváros away 0–1. The purple and whites have not recorded a single victory over FTC ever since. In 2016, Ferencváros beat Újpest 1‐0 in the Hungarian cup final. In 2018, both teams finished within the top 3 for the first time since 2004, as FTC finished 2nd, while Újpest finished 3rd. The two sides have met in 238 1st Division games, with Ferencváros winning 118, and Újpest winning 61 of them.

On the day of the match the police have to defend the public from the aggressive supporters of the two clubs. Therefore, the Line 3 of the Budapest Metro is controlled by the police and special carriages are provided before and after the match. The purple-white supporters of the Újpest FC get on at the Újpest-Központ metro station which is the closest metro station to the Szusza Ferenc Stadium. They get off at the Népliget metro station which is next to the Albert Stadion. The journey usually ends up in aggression and vandalism caused by the police and exaggerated by the media.

=== Ferencváros and MTK rivalry ===
The rivalry between Ferencvárosi TC and MTK Budapest is also one of the most tense fixtures in the Hungarian League. Because the two clubs came from neighbouring districts of Budapest, the tension is even higher. The tension between the two clubs is based on racism. MTK Budapest FC is considered a Jewish club since many Jewish figures appeared in the club between the 1930s and the 1940s while Ferencvárosi TC is associated with far-right politics. Between 1903 and 1929 the two clubs won 24 Hungarian League titles (13 MTK and 11 Ferencváros) out of 24, therefore their match was considered the final of the championship. From the 1930s the two clubs could not maintain their position since other clubs appeared such as Újpest FC in the 1930s (winning five titles) and Csepel in the 1940s (winning four titles). The only non-Budapest team was Nagyváradi AC who won in 1944. Since then the reign of the two clubs was not significant anymore. However, both clubs could win more titles since then. In the early 2000s the two clubs shared the same owner (Gábor Várszegi) which sparked big tension between the two clubs. MTK suffered from antisemitism during World War II. At present MTK have lost their spectators since less than 1000 spectators are present during the football matches, therefore atrocity is scarce.

MTK won the 1932 Hungarian Cup, by defeating FTC 4–3, in a game where Ferencváros scrambled a 0–2 lead. 3 years later, the team from the 9th district exacted revenge, as they beat MTK in the 1935 Hungarian cup final. in 1940, as a response to the tighter restrictions on Jewish people in Hungary, MTK disbanded, due to the club's heavy Jewish-affiliation. After the Second World War ended, MTK were founded again, and saw some success, namely winning the 1951, 1953 and 1957/58 national championships, and would not leave the top 3 for 10 seasons. However, by 1941, Ferencváros had overtaken MTK in terms of national championships, and while MTK faced a title-drought after 1958, that spanned nearly three decades, Ferencváros, who had a title-drought of their own, between 1949 and 1963, won an additional 6 national championships by the time MTK were champions again, in 1987.

In 1963, Ferencváros finished 6 points above MTK, to end their league-title drought which had been plighting the club since 1949. They would add four further league-titles to their already stacked trophy cabinet in the 1960s decade. In 1966, Ferencváros beat MTK 7‐1, their highest scoring victory in the eternal derby.

In 1976, Ferencváros beat MTK in the final of the Hungarian cup 1‐0. This year FTC achieved the double, as they had also won the league, breaking Úpest's hegemony in the championship. MTK finished 6th.

In 1981, Ferencváros won their first league title in 5 years, after finishing 3 points above Tatabánya. MTK finished 17th, and were relegated for the first time in 40 years. By 1983, they had been promoted as champions of the 2nd Division, and MTK defeated FTC at home for the first time since 1961, after beating the green and whites 4‐0. In 1987 MTK ended their league-trophy drought of 29 years, and won the 1st Division after finishing 3 points above Újpest, while Ferencváros finished 6th.

In 1991, MTK achieved their first win at FTC's stadium since 1970, after going down 1-0 early on, Balog equalized for the red and blues, and Morozov scored the winning goal in the 85th minute. Ferencváros won the league in 1992, 1995 and 1996. In 1997, MTK won another league title, after finishing 9 points above Újpest, and 11 points above FTC. In 1999, MTK finished 19 points above runners-up Ferencváros, and claimed their 21st title.

In 2000 FTC claimed their first victory at Hungária körút since 1992, after beating MTK 2‐3. In 2001, Ferencváros won their 27th league title. Although MTK won the regular season of the 2001/02 season, they finished 3rd place in the 2nd round, behind first-time winners Zalaegerszeg, and Ferencváros. In 2003, MTK won the league for a third time in 6 years, after finishing 2 points above Ferencváros. They also defeated Ferencváros 2‐0 in the 2003 Hungarian Supercup. This marked the first time MTK beat their green and white neighbours in a final since 1932. In 2004, Ferencváros won the league again, after finishing one point above arch-rivals Újpest. In 2005, Ferencváros and MTK finished on equal points (56), and finished 2nd and 3rd respectively, as Debreceni VSC became the first eastern Hungarian team to win the top-flight. In 2006, Ferencváros were relegated from the 1st Division for the first time in their history, and MTK achieved their 23rd top-flight title, and their most recent, in 2008. Ferencváros returned to the top Division in 2009, and won their first league title in 12 years in 2016. In 2022, MTK defeated FTC at the Üllői Út for the first time in 20 years, after beating the green and whites 0‐4. The two teams have met in over 200 league games, with Ferencváros winning 91 "Eternal Derbies", and MTK being victorious on 76 occasions.

=== MTK - Újpest rivalry ===
MTK and Újpest, based in the 8th and 4th districts of Budapest respectively, are the second and third most decorated Hungarian teams. The sides have met in 224 top-flight matches, 88 of which MTK won, while Újpest were victorious 83 times.

The first time the two teams met was in the 2nd Division, in 1902, with MTK winning 5-0. 3 years later, the sides met in the top-flight for the first time, in 1905. For the ensuing 3 decades, while MTK were winning championship upon championship, Újpest won their first title in 1930, by which time MTK had 12 league titles. Újpest were also struggling head-to-head against MTK during this time, only winning 5 encounters between 1905 and 1925.

The tide seemed to turn in the 1930s decade, as Újpest won the championship 5 times, and were giving the previously dominating teams, Ferencváros and MTK a run for their money. MTK also won 2 league titles in 1936 and 1937.

In may of 1940, the two teams played a spectacular 3‐3 draw. For the next 5 years, this would be the last time the game was held, as MTK disbanded during the Second World War due to their Jewish affiliation, and the club's president was murdered by Nyilas forces. Im 1941, Ferencváros overtook MTK as the Hungarian team with the most league-titles. In 1945, MTK were founded again, and in the same year, Újpest beat MTK for the first time in 9 years. Újpest won three consecutive league titles between 1945 and 1947.

In 1951, MTK ended their 14-year league-title drought, as they finished 4 points above emerging Budapest Honvéd, while Újpest finished 3rd. In 1953, MTK, now known as Budapesti Vörös Lobogó, won the league again, after finishing 3 points above Honvéd. In 1957, Újpest beat MTK at the Megyeri út 2‐1, for the first time in 7 years. In 1958, MTK won their 18th 1st Division honor, while Újpest finished 7th. The purple and whites failed to win a single trophy throughout the entire decade.

In 1960, Újpest won their first championship since 1947, while MTK finished 4th. In 1961, Újpest finished 2nd, 4 points off of the title, and MTK achieved a bronze-medal finish, 2 points behind Újpest. In 1963, the roles were reversed, as MTK fell 6 points short off the championship, while Újpest finished 1 point behind them. In 1966, MTK achieved their worst season finish up to that point, after finishing 10th. The following season the white and blues were 10th again, and in 1968, MTK finished 11th, their new lowest finish. In 1969 Újpest won their second championship of the decade, and also managed to win the Hungarian cup.

The 1970s was the most successful decade in Újpest's history, with the purple and whites winning 8 consecutive championships between 1969 and 1976, a feat that still stands to this day. For the 1970 season, the federation decided to split the Division into two groups of 8. The points the teams accumulated would stay with them for the 1970/71 season, and would be added to the teams' point tally at the end of the season. Újpest and MTK were both drawn into Group A, which the purple and whites won, finishing 5 points above 2nd place MTK. MTK finished the 1971/72 season 13th, their lowest league position up to that point. In 1978, Újpest won their 9th league-title of the decade, after finishing 1 point above Honvéd, and 4 points above MTK. The following season, Újpest retained the title, while MTK achieved their fourth new worst league position in 13 years, after finishing 14th. Throughout the entire 70's decade, Újpest were undefeated at home against MTK, with the purple team winning all but one encounter against MTK at the Megyeri út. MTK did not fare much better at home against the team from the 4th district throughout the 1970s, as they only managed to beat them twice, in 1970 and in 1975.

In 1981, MTK were relegated after 40 years, but won the 2nd Division the following season, and were promptly back. Also in 1981, Újpest recorded their lowest league finish in 26 years, as they finished 8th. This was the first time since 1964 that Újpest failed to finish in the top 4. In November 1984, MTK defeated Újpest at Megyeri út for the first time since 1965, after an own goal from Zoltán Ebedli. In 1987, MTK ended their 29-year long title drought, and won the 1st Division. They finished 3 points above runners-up Újpest, who returned to the top 3 after spending 6 consecutive seasons away from it. Up to that point, this was the longest ever continuous period Újpest spent outside the top 3, beating their previous period between 1904 and 1910. In August 1987, Újpest defeated MTK at Megyeri út for the first time in 10 years, after shutting out the 8th districtians 4‐0. In March 1988, MTK recorded their first victory over Újpest at Hungária körút since 1975, besting the purple and whites 2‐0.

In 1990, the two teams had a near identical season as they both finished on 48 points; Újpest went undefeated at home, and would win 18 games, draw 4 and lose 8. MTK only had one loss at home, against Veszprém, and would finish the season with the same number of wins as Újpest. Even the games they played against each other had the same scoreline, with Újpest beating MTK 2–0 at the Megyeri út, while MTK overcame UTE 2–0 at home. It all came down to the last day of the season, when Újpest defeated Honvéd 2-0, while MTK suffered an upset defeat against Váci-Izzó. Újpest would be crowned champions, their first league title since 1979. In 1993, Újpest achieved their first victory at MTK's stadium in 8 years, however, that season Újpest achieved their lowest ever league finish, 14th, and only managed to salvage themselves from relegation during a 2-legged play-off fixture against Hatvan, which they won 2‐1 on aggregate. In 1994, MTK were relegated to the 2nd Division, after only accumulating 17 points, and finishing last. They would be promoted the season after. In 1997, MTK won their 20th league-title, and added a second star to their crest, while Újpest finished runners-up, 9 points off of the white and blues. The following year, Újpest achieved their 20th league-title, while MTK finished 5th, 15th points off of the trophy. the 4th districtians had the opportunity to achieve their first league & cup "double" since 1975, after reaching the final of the Hungarian cup. However, Újpest lost 1–0 to MTK, who won their second Hungarian cup in 2 years, having won the 1997 edition as well. In 1999, it was MTK's turn again to win the league, finishing an astounding 19 points ahead of 2nd place FTC, and 20 points ahead of 3rd place UTE

In March 2001, Újpest defeated MTK 2‐1 at home marking first time since 1994 that the purple and whites defeated MTK at the Megyeri út. The 2002/03 season featured a regular season, consisting of 22 games, and a play-off round, consisting of 10 games. In the regular season, MTK finished 2nd, 7 points above Újpest, who came 3rd. In the play-off part of the season, MTK eventually managed to win the season, after defeating Újpest 1–0 at the Megyeri út on the last day of the season, while Ferencváros failed to beat DVSC at Üllői út. MTK finished 2 points above runners-up FTC, while UTE finished 4th. In 2008, MTK won their 23rd top-flight tite, finishing 2 points above DVSC, meanwhile Újpest finished 4th. In October 2008, Újpest defeated MTK 4–1 in the league at the Ferenc Szusza Stadium for the first time in 4 years. In 2011 MTK were relegated again, after finishing 15th, 4 points off safety. They were promoted after spending one season in the 2nd Division. In May 2014, MTK defeated Újpest 4–0 at the Megyeri út. This was MTK's first win in the 4th district since 2008. In 2017, MTK would suffer their third relegation in 23 years, after they finished level on points with Diósgyőr, but had a worse goal difference. They would make their return to NB1 in 2018, but their stay was short-lived, as the club was relegated for the second time in 3 seasons, in 2019.

In 2020, MTK were promoted from the 2nd Division as champions, winning their fourth title of the Division. In February 2021, Újpest beat MTK at Hungária körút for the first time since 2014, after overcoming MTK 1-3. In April 2022, the 4th districtians recorded their first league win at home over MTK since 2015, after beating them 2‐0, with goals from Katona and Zivzivadze. Despite winning their last game 3–0 against DVSC, MTK were relegated in 2022, finishing 2 points off safety. In 2023, MTK were promoted after a 2nd-place finish, and the team kicked off their 109th top-flight season with a 1–1 draw against Paks.

=== Ferencváros and Honvéd rivalry ===
The rivalry between Ferencváros and Honvéd dates back to the 1950s when Ferenc Puskás and József Bozsik played for the red and blacks (Honvéd). Honvéd won their first Hungarian league title in 1950. By this time Ferencváros had already won 17 championships. In the 1950s, the fortunes of the two teams changed drastically. FTC's era of dominance came to a halt, with the green and white side having to temporarily change their colors to red and white, and, under pressure from the government, had to change their name to Édosz SE, then Budapesti Kinizsi. Honvéd, on the other hand, were the favoured team by the government, and changed their name from Kispesti AC, to the now infamous Budapest Honvéd, in 1950. The red and blacks won five national championships in the following decade, a side that had never won one before. FTC would get their name and original colours back in 1956, and ended their 8-year winless run against Honvéd a couple of months later. The April 1958 meeting between Ferencváros and Honvéd was the first ever televised football fixture in Hungary.

In 1963, Ferencváros won their first league title since 1949, and in 1964, they beat out Budapest Honvéd by 3 points, to clinch their 19th national title. Honvéd won the cup in the same year. In the 70's, Honvéd did not win a single national honour, although they came close numerous times, as they finished 2nd in four seasons, while Ferencváros won 1 league title, and 4 national cups. Honvéd ended their almost 3-decade long wait for a national title in the 1979/80 season, and also managed to beat Ferencváros at Üllői Út the following year, a ground they had not won at since 1969. Since then the two clubs are considered rivals. Moreover, the proximity of the two districts is also a cause of tension. The stadium (Bozsik Stadion) of Honvéd is located in the 19th district of Budapest while Ferencváros's stadium Albert Stadion) in the ninth district. The 1950s was ruled by Honvéd winning five Hungarian championship titles. The second revival of Honvéd was in the 1980s when the club won six titles and two in 1990 and 1993 with players like Kálmán Kovács, Lajos Détári, Béla Illés, Gábor Halmai and István Vincze. In the 2000s the matches between the two clubs still ignite a big tension, but the number of the spectators has decreased.

The team from the 19th district of Budapest would win a further 4 national championships in the 1980s decade, including a three-peat, between 1984 and '86. They would also complete a league-cup "double" in 1985. The sides met in the 1989 Hungarian cup final where Honvéd won 1–0 to clinch their fourth Hungarian Cup. Ferencváros would have their own winless streak at Honvéd's stadium, between 1982 and 1989, with the streak being broken in October 1989, in front of 20,000 people, when FTC beat Honvéd 0-2.

After experiencing another national title drought between 1981 and 1992, Ferencváros won their 24th league title in the 1991/92 season. The green and whites won two more league titles in the decade, while Honvéd were crowned champions in the 1992/93 season, where FTC, who finished 3rd place, were only 2 points off Kispest. The sides also met in the 1993 Hungarian Supercup, where Ferencváros beat Honvéd 2-1. the 1994 edition of the cup featured a 2-legged final, featuring FTC and Honvéd. Ferencváros won both legs, and thus won their 17th Hungarian cup. In June 1999, Honvéd won their first game at Üllői út in 10 years' time, with a late goal from Borgulya.

The 2000s were a decade to forget for both clubs, as Honvéd were relegated in 2003, for the first time since 1916. The red and blacks would get promoted after spending only one season in the 2nd Division, and would eventually close out the decade with 2 Hungarian cups, won in 2007 and 2009. Ferencváros, although becoming Hungarian champions in 2001 and 2004 (year of the league-cup "double", where Ferencváros beat Honvéd 3–1 in the cup final), were relegated in 2006, after not receiving a First Division licence, due to financial predicaments. This was the green and whites' first relegation in their over 100-year old history, and they would not see the 1st Division again until 2009.

In October 2013, Honvéd defeated Ferencváros at Üllői út 1-2, in what remains their final victory at their rival's ground. In 2016, Ferencváros won the league for the first time in 12 years, while Honvéd were champions the following year, breaking their 14 year long league title drought. in May 2019, Honvéd beat FTC 3-2, although Ferencváros became champions that night, regardless of the result. Honvéd have not beaten FTC since, and were relegated from the top-flight in 2023.

=== Újpest - Honvéd rivalry ===
Újpest and Budapest Honvéd are the third and fourth most decorated teams in terms of league titles. Due to the two teams' proximity, and the number of times they have met in the top-flight, this is one of the most fierce rivalries within Budapest.

The sides first met in 1916, when they were known as UTE and Kispesti AC, respectively. Between 1926 and 1943, Kispest was unable to claim a win over their Northern rivals, with Újpest winning all but two of their match-ups in that timeframe. The following year, Kispest beat UTE at the Megyeri út for the first time since 1926. While Honvéd were the first team out of the two to win silverware, namely, the 1926 Hungarian Cup, Újpest spent the subsequent 2 decades winning 7 national titles, establishing itself as a top club. In 1950, by which time Újpest had come to be 8-time Hungarian champions, Honvéd won their first league-title, finishing 4 points above Ferencváros, then known as Édosz SE. In 1954, Újpesti Dózsa beat Honvéd away for the first time since 1947. The purple and whites won the game 4‐5, with Ferenc Szusza scoring a hat-trick. By the end of the decade, Honvéd had claimed the league trophy 5 times, while other prominent clubs from the capital, like Újpest and Ferencváros experienced long title droughts, with Újpest not winning the championship between 1947 and 1960, and FTC winning the 1963 championship, for the first time in 14 years.

In the 1960s, Újpest won two national titles, in 1960, and 1969. In the latter season, Újpest started off the era, which has since come to be known in the club's history as Magical Újpest. This period covers Újpesti Dózsa's remarkable run from 1969 until 1979, when the club won 8 league titles, and 2 cups under head coach Lajós Baróti. They also won the Hungarian cup, for the first time in their history, after defeating Honvéd 3‐1 in the 1969 Hungarian cup final. In the same year, Újpest also reached the final of the Inter-Cities Fairs Cup.

In 1973, Honvéd finished runners-up, 7 points behind Újpest. In 1974, Honvéd won their first game at Megyeri út since 1959, after beating the purple and white side 1‐3. This would be one of only two league wins Kispest would achieve in the entire 1970s in the 4th district. In 1975, Kispest yet again finished runners-up behind their purple counterparts, this time, 3 points off. In 1978, a single point separated the two clubs after the last round. Despite Honvéd defeating a 10-man Vasas 2-0, and Újpest only managing a draw against Ferencváros on the last day of the season, Kispest had to further prolong their wait for a first national title since 1955.

In 1980, Budapest Honvéd ended their 25-year drought of a league title, and won the championship ahead of Újpest, preventing the purple and whites from achieving a 3-peat. In 1983, Újpest defeated Honvéd in the Hungarian cup final 3‐1, and won the competition for the fifth time. Between 1984 and 1986, Kispest won three national titles in successive seasons, becoming the first team to do so since Újpest between 1969 and 1972, and 1973 and 1976. Kispest also won the Hungarian cup in 1985 and 1989. Although Újpest failed to win a single league title in the decade, they remained a tough opponent for Honvéd, as the team from the 19th district only beat Újpest 4 times in the 1980s. Honvéd would win two further league titles, in 1988 and 1989, however, in an ironic twist of events, their second 3-peat attempt was thwarted by Újpest. The purple and whites won their first championship since 1979, and prevented Kispest from achieving 3 consecutive league-titles, in very similar fashion to the way Kispest prevented them, a decade prior. Kispest finished 13th that season, 2 points above the relegation zone.

Nevertheless, Kispest regained their old form, and won the league again in 1991, and 1993. In 1997, Újpest defeated Honvéd away for the first time since 1989, with goals from Véber and Sebők. In 1998, Újpest won their 20th national championship of and added the much coveted second star to their crest, while Kispest finished dangerously close to the relegation zone. In 2001, Kispest defeated Újpest at the Megyeri út for the first time since 1993.

In 2003, Honvéd were relegated from the 1st Division for the first time since 1916, although they would rebound quickly, as they were promoted after one season. Újpest won the Hungarian Cup again in 2002, while Honvéd won the competition in 2007 and 2009. In 2010, Honvéd achieved their first win at the Ferenc Szusza Stadium since 2004. In 2017, Kispest ended their 14-year wait for a national championship, after winning the 1st Division. With that, Újpest were now the Budapest-based club experiencing the second longest wait for a national championship (since 1998), behind Vasas. In 2020, Újpest beat Honvéd away for the first time in 5 years, after beating the red and blacks 1‐2. In 2023, Honvéd were relegated from NB1. Újpest and Honvéd have met in over 200 league games, with Újpest winning 107, and Honvéd winning 56.

=== Honvéd vs. MTK ===
MTK and Honvéd are both based in the Southern part of Pest, in the 8th and 19th districts respectively. The two sides have met in 197 top-flight games. Their first meeting was in 1916, where MTK shut Honvéd out an incredible 10-0.

Until the end of the 1940s, the rivalry was very one-sided in MTK's favour, both in the league as head to head, as MTK won 15 championships by 1945, while Honvéd achieved their second silver-medal finish in 1947, their only national honor up to that point. From 1916 until 1945, Honvéd only managed to MTK in 4 league games, which highlights the white and blues' dominance over the inter-war decades. In 1945, Honvéd defeated MTK 0–6 at Hungária körút. In June 1946, Honvéd and MTK played a spectacular 6–5 at Üllői út, with the legendary Ferenc Puskás scoring a hat-trick in 45 minutes. In the 1949/50 Budapest Honvéd won their first top-flight title, finishing 4 points above Ferencváros, while MTK finished 3rd.

Honvéd also won the 1950 autumn championship, finishing 3 points above MTK. MTK would seek revenge for this the following season, as they won their first championship since 1937. Honvéd finished runners-up, 4 points off MTK. In 1952 the teams were separated by just 2 points, as Honvéd clinched their third title. In 1953 MTK defeated Honvéd 2–1 in front of 70,000 people, in the first MTK-Honvéd match-up held in the Népstadion. That season MTK finished 3 points above Honvéd, and won the league. In 1954 the two teams yet again finished in the top 2 spots of the league, with Budapest Honvéd becoming champions again, finishing 5 points above MTK. Honvéd scored 100 goals throughout the season, while MTK hit the net 82 times overall, the 2 highest in the league by a wide margin. In 1955, the scenario happened again, with Honvéd clinching their fifth top-division title in 5 years. MTK finished runners-up, 4 points off of Honvéd. In January 1955, Honvéd beat MTK at Üllői Út in front of 25,000 people in a memorable 7–9 game, which featured Ferenc Puskás scoring 4 goals, while Sándor Kocsis completed a hat-trick. MTK's Nándor Hidegkúti also found the back of the net 4 times. In 1956, Honvéd were leading the league table and looked destined for another championship as they were 3 points above Újpesti Dózsa, but due to the Hungarian Revolution of 1956, the league was suspended, and never finished. MTK were placed 3rd. In 1958 MTK won their 18th league-title, and of course finished 1 point above Honvéd. with this trophy, MTK would, albeit for a prief period of time, become the record champions of Hungary, until FTC equalled their tally in 1963. In 1959 MTK were close to winning their second consecutive championship, as they finished level on points with Csepel, but had to settle for the 2nd place because of goaldifference. Honvéd finished 3rd, 1 point off both teams.

In 1963, Honvéd defeated MTK for the first time in 4 years, shutting out their Pestern rivals 4–0 at the Népstadion. Lajos Tichy scored a hat-trick in 11 minutes. At the end of the season, Honvéd finished level on points with Győr and FTC, but Győr were declared champions due to their goal range. MTK finished 7th. The following season, both teams retained their positions, as Honvéd finished 3 points off the trophy, while MTK finished 7th again. In August 1966, MTK beat Honvéd in the league for the first time in 4 years, defeating them 2–0 at Hungária körút. In 1968, MTK defeated Honvéd 2–1 at Népstadion in the Hungarian Cup final to win their 9th edition of the trophy. In 1969, Honvéd finished runners-up again, while MTK finished 9th.

In 1971 the clubs were separated by 1 position on the league table, as Honvéd finished 4th, 3 points above MTK. In 1978 Honvéd finished 2nd, 3 points above 3rd place MTK. In 1980 Honvéd ended their 25-year wait for a national title, and won the league, while MTK finished 8th. In 1981 MTK were relegated for the first time in 40 years. The team only won 4 games, and only collected 22 points. They would return as of NB2 champions in 1982. In 1984 Honvéd won their seventh top-flight title, while MTK finished 9th. The following season the red and blacks retained their championship, finishing 10 points above Győri-ETO. MTK (who finished 2 points above relegation) and Honvéd clashed on the last day of the season, where Honvéd bested MTK at Hungária körút 2-4. In 1986 Honvéd became the second team after Újpest in the 1970s to win three consecutive championships, as they finished 6 points above Pécs. MTK finished 7th. In 1987 MTK won their first league-title since 1958, while losing 4 games in the entire season. They defeated Honvéd 2-0 during the season, with a brace from György Szeibert. Honvéd finished outside the top 3 for the first time in 4 years. However, the following season Honvéd were champions again, repeating this feat in 1989, when the two teams played each other in the last game of the season. Heading into the game, the two teams were level on points, so in a way this was the de facto final of the season, which Honvéd won 2-0. In 1990 MTK won their first league game at Bozsik-Stadium since 1970, after securing a 2–1 victory in the 19th district. That season, the white and blues came unbelievably close to another league title, and were leading the table 3 points ahead of UTE with one game to go. However, MTK suffered a 2–1 loss to Vác, while Újpest defeated Honvéd to win the league.

In 1991 Honvéd won the league for the seventh time in 11 years, after finishing 5 points above Ferencváros. In 1993 the red and blues won their second league-title of the decade, while MTK finished 4th. The following season, MTK were relegated from the top-flight, but would return a year later. In 1997 MTK won the top-flight for the first time in a decade, finishing 9 points above Újpest, Honvéd achieved a 7th-place finish. In 1999 MTK won another championship. Between 1997 and 1999, Budapest Honvéd produces three consecutive finishes outside the top10, which was unprecedented in the club's history.

In 2003 MTK won their 22nd top-flight title, while Honvéd finished 11th and were relegated for the first time in almost a century. They regained their NB1 status the following season, after winning NB2. In May 2007 Honvéd defeated MTK at the Bozsik Stadium for the first time in 6 years, winning 2-1. In October of that year, the red and blacks recorded their first win at Hungária körút since 1995, with the same scoreline, 2-1. In 2008 MTK won their last championship to date, finishing 2 points above DVSC, whom they had finished runners-up to the season prior.

In 2011 MTK were relegated from the top-flight after 15 years. Their relegation was confirmed on the penultimate day of the season, where despite winning 3–0 at Pápa's Perutz Stadion, the club were officially relegated. They returned the following season as champions of NB2. The club would suffer 3 further relegations during the decade (2017,2019,2021), but would always achieve promotion first time trying. In March 2015, MTK recorded what remains to this day their last win at Bozsik Stadium, winning 0-2, after scoring 2 goals in 4 minutes. In February 2017 Honvéd won their first game at Hidegkúti Nándor Stadium in 10 years. The red and blacks would go on to be champions at the end of the season, claiming the trophy after 15 years.

In 2022 Honvéd were relegated from the top-flight for the first time in 19 years.

=== MTK vs. Vasas ===
MTK and Vasas are two of the most decorated clubs in the capital, having won a total of 43 national honours between them. The clubs are based in the 8th and 13th districts of Budapest respectively. The sides first met in the top flight in 1916 with MTK winning 4–0 at Hungária körút. The rivalry was fairly one-sided until the 1950s. While MTK won championships in all of the first four decades of the century, and had amassed 11 titles by the 1940s, Vasas were relegated from the 1st Division in 1932 and would spend the next decade there.

In August 1945 Vasas claimed their first home victory over MTK in the league, after winning 5‐2. Between 1946 and 1949 MTK was unable to win against Vasas a single time. The streak was broken in December 1949, after MTK beat vasas 0–2 at Vasas' stadium with a brace from István Szolnok. In 1951 MTK won their first championship in 14 years, while Vasas finished 4th. In 1953 the title returned to MTK again, while Vasas achieved their second bronze-medal finish. The 1957 season featured a shortened schedule of just 11 games, and there were no relegations at the end of the season, due to the turmoil caused by the 1956 Hungarian Revolution. MTK and Vasas played each other in the penultimate game of the season, with MTK beating Vasas 3–2 at the Népstadion. In spite of this, Vasas finished 1 point above MTK, and claimed their first ever Hungarian championship under coach Lajos Baróti. The following season MTK won the league again, with Vasas finishing 5th. In May 1959, the two teams contested the highest ever attended fixture between the two, with 80.000 people cramming in to the Népstadion to watch them play. Vasas won the game 2–1 after a brace from Raduly.

In 1961 Vasas won the league, after finishing 4 points above Újpest, and 6 points above MTK. The following season the club from the 13th district retained their title, after finishing 2 points above FTC. Vasas and MTK met on the last day of the season at the Népstadion, and played an enthralling 2-2. In September 1964 Vasas beat MTK 6–2 in a memorable game. Lajos Puskás scored 4 goals. In 1965 Vasas won their third championship, and beat MTK twice over the season, 2-0 and 1-0 respectively. In 1966 the red and blues retained their title, finishing 6 points above FTC. Between 1964 and 1968, there was a 7-game period where MTK was winless against Vasas in the league. This beat MTK's previous, 6-game winless run against Vasas, occurring in the '40's. The string of bad results was broken in August 1968, after MTK defeated Vasas 4-2.

In 1975 Vasas beat MTK for the first time in 4 years, after overcoming the white and blues 4-2. This was Vasas' first home win against MTK since 1968. In June 1977 Vasas recorded their first win at Hungária körút since 1971, after defeating MTK 1-2. Three games later Vasas won their sixth national title, which remains their most recent one.

In 1981 MTK were relegated for the first time in 40 years, but would return to NB1 after one season. In 1985 MTK defeated Vasas in the league for the first time in 7 years. Imre Fodor scored the winning goal in the 2–1 victory for the white and blues at Hungária körút. In 1987 MTK won the league for the first time since 1958, being 3 points clear Újpest. Vasas finished 6th. In May 1990 Vasas defeated MTK 2-1, with a late goal from László Gubucz.

In 1997 MTK won the league just 2 years after gaining promotion from NB2. Vasas finished 4th, 19 points off the champions. In May 1998 Vasas defeated MTK in the league for the first time in four years. The club from Angyalföld overcame MTK 1–0 at the 13th district with a goal from Zalán Zombori. Vasas finished 3rd at the end of the season, 6 points above MTK. In 1999 MTK won the league again, while Vasas achieved a 6th place finish. In 2000 the clubs finished within 2 points of each other, with MTK finishing 2nd, while Vasas achieving another 3rd place finish. MTK handed Vasas their only home loss of the autumn part of the campaign, defeating the red and blues 2–1 at Fáy utca in October 1999. In May 2000 the two teams met in the Népstadiom for the first time in over two and a half decades, as MTK defeated Vasas 3–1 in the final of the Hungarian Cup. In October 2000 Vasas defeated MTK at Hungária körút for the first time in 7 years. The red and blues won 2-1.

In 2001 Vasas achieved a 3rd place finish, while MTK finished 6th. The next season, after an incredible drop in their form, Vasas performed very poorly. The red and blues started off the season with a 0–1 loss to MTK, and lost all of their first six games. The side would eventually only win one home game all season, and were relegated for the first time since 1945. In 2003 MTK won their 22nd Hungarian championship, finishing 2 points above Ferencváros. The same year Vasas folded for a brief period of time, before being bought by János Jámbor. The club was ejected from NB2, but after buying the 2nd Division license of Kecskemét, the team found itself back in NB2 in 2004, from where they were promoted after one year. In November 2004 the teams met again after almost three years, with Vasas defeating MTK 3-1. Despite this, MTK ended up having a much better season, finishing 4th, while Vasas finished 3 points above relegation. In September 2006 MTK defeated Vasas at Fáy utca for the first time in 5 years. The white and blues obliterated Vasas 5-1, with Krisztián Németh scoring a hat-trick in 18 minutes. In 2008 MTK won the Hungarian top-flight, breaking DVSC's hegemony. With 4 games to go, MTK hosted Vasas, who handed them one of only two defeats the 8th district side suffered at home. Vasas won the game 2-0. This was also the Angyalföld team's first occasion of winning at Hungária körút in eight years.

In September 2010 MTK defeated Vasas 4-0. In the 2010s both sides were plagued by numerous relegations. In 2011 MTK were relegated, but managed to gain promotion via first time trying. The following season, Vasas suffered relegation, and spent the ensuing 3 seasons in NB2. In 2015, Vasas were promoted as champions, and the two teams met in the top-flight again after 4 years in August. MTK won the game 0–1 with an '85 minute goal from Lóránd Szatmári. In 2016 Vasas ended their winless streak against MTK both at Fáy utca and at Hungária körút. The 13th district club defeated MTK 0–2 in April at Hungária körút for the first time in 6 years. In October, Vasas recorded their first home victory over MTK since 2009, after winning 3–2 in a game where all 5 goals were scored before the 32nd minute mark. At the end of the season Vasas finished 3rd, while MTK were relegated. In 2018 Vasas were relegated to NB2, while MTK returned to the top-flight, where they stayed for one season before finishing 11th in 2019. In September 2019 the Vasas-MTK fixture took place in the 2nd Division for the first time since 1940, with MTK winning 4–1 at Fáy utca.

== Hungarian Cup Finals ==
The inaugural edition of the Hungarian cup was held in 1910. At the time, football clubs were almost exclusively Budapest-based, so it is no surprise that from the cup's inception until 1941, at least one participant in every final was from the capital. MTK was the first team that is still active to win the cup in its first ever final, against Budapesti TC.

The first Örökrangadó final in the cup took place in 1913, and the first Ferencváros-Újpest matchup in the Hungarian cup final was in 1922. In 1933 Ferencváros won their fifth Hungarian cup, after defeating Újpest 11-1. Two years later Ferencváros defeated 9-man MTK 2-1 to win their sixth cup.

In the 1940's Ferencváros became the first club to complete a three-peat, as they won the Hungarian cup in three consecutive seasons between 1942 and 1944. In 1955 Honvéd and Vasas contested the Hungarian cup final in front of 50,000 people, in what was both teams' first appearance in the final. Vasas triumphed 3-2.

In 1968 MTK defeated Honvéd 2-1 to win their first cup in 16 years. The following season Honvéd suffered another loss in the final, this time losing 3-1 to Újpest, as the 4th district team claimed their first ever Hungarian cup.

In 1973 Vasas and Honvéd played a "re-match" of their 1955 final. Vasas ended up winning 4-3 after extra time in what was one of the most exciting cup finals in Hungarian football's history. Béla Várady scored a hat-trick, including the decisive goal in the '98th minute.

In 1976 FTC defeated MTK 1-0 in the final to claim their thirteenth Hungarian cup. In 1977 The cup final was contested in a round-robin format, with the last four remaining teams playing each other once. Three of the four teams that made it to the final were from the capital, namely Ferencváros, Újpest and Vasas. However, the eventual winner was a club from the Northern part of the country, DVTK, who won their first edition of the trophy.

In 1983 Honvéd suffered their fifth loss in a cup final to a fellow Budapestian side, as the red and blacks lost 2-3 to Újpest.

In 1986 Vasas defeated Ferencváros in the cup final through penalties after a goalless 120 minutes.

In 1989 Honvéd overcame FTC 1-0 in the final to win their fourth Hungarian cup. In 1994 Ferencváros sought revenge as the two teams met in the cup final again, this time the green and whites winning 2-1 with an '81st minute goal from László Wukovits. The game featured 7 yellow cards, and a red card for Honvéd player Sallói in the '87th minute.

The 1996 final featured two Budapest-based clubs again, Honvéd and BVSC, and was contested over two legs. The first leg was an especially violent encounter, as the game saw 10 yellow cards and two red cards. BVSC emerged victorious 1-0. In the second game 10-man Honvéd managed to turn the tide, winning 2-0, with both goals being scored in the last seven minutes of regular time. The goals were scored within just 120 seconds of each other, making this one of the most remarkable comebacks in the history of the cup.

The following year BVSC lost another final, in humiliating fashion. The team became the second team after Vác to lose consecutive cup finals in the 1990s. MTK claimed their 10th Hungarian cup, defeating BVSC by a complete shut-out 8-0 on aggregate. MTK won the first leg 6-0, essentially deciding the trophy's fate in one game. The white and blues won the second game with a brace from Ferenc Orosz.

In 1998 MTK denied Újpest the chance to complete a league-cup double, as the 8th district team defeated league champions Újpest 1-0 in the final, with Attila Kutor's goal.

In 2000 MTK's dominance in the cup continued, as they came from 1-0 down to defeat Vasas 3-1 in the final of the Hungarian cup.

In 2004 FTC completed the "double", after winning the league ahead of Újpest and claiming their twentieth cup. In the final they defeated Budapest Honvéd 3-1. This was FTC's second consecutive cup after defeating Debrecen the season prior.

In 2016 Ferencváros and Újpest contested the first "All-Budapest" cup final in 12 years, meaning both participants were from the capital. FTC won the game 1-0 with a goal from Zoltán Gera. In 2017 Vasas and Ferencváros contested their third encounter in the Hungarian cup final, with Ferencváros retaining their title, after defeating the red and blues 5-4 on penalties.

=== Titles by club ===
Club	League	Cup	League Cup	Supercup	Total
Ferencváros	34	24	2	6	66
MTK Budapest	23	12		3	38
Újpest	20	11		3	34
Budapest Honvéd	14	8			22
Vasas	6	4			10
Csepel	4				4
Budapesti TC	2				2

== See also ==
- Major football rivalries
