= Ferenc Lengyel =

Hungarian footballer

Personal information
- Date of birth: 9 September 1966 (age 60)
- Place of birth: Dunaújváros, Hungary
- Height: 1.91 m (6 ft 3 in)
- Position: Midfielder

Youth career
- 1978–1986: Dunaújváros FC (1952)

Senior career*
Years	Team	Apps	(Gls)
1986–1992	Dunaújváros FC (1952)	14	(0)
1992–1995	Pécsi	67	(5)
1995–2003	Dunaferr	162	(37)
- * Club domestic league appearances and goals

Ferenc Lengyel (born 9 September 1966) is a retired Hungarian football midfielder.

== Honours ==
Dunaferr

- Nemzeti Bajnokság I: 1999–2000
