= László Kovács (footballer, born 1951) =

Hungarian footballer

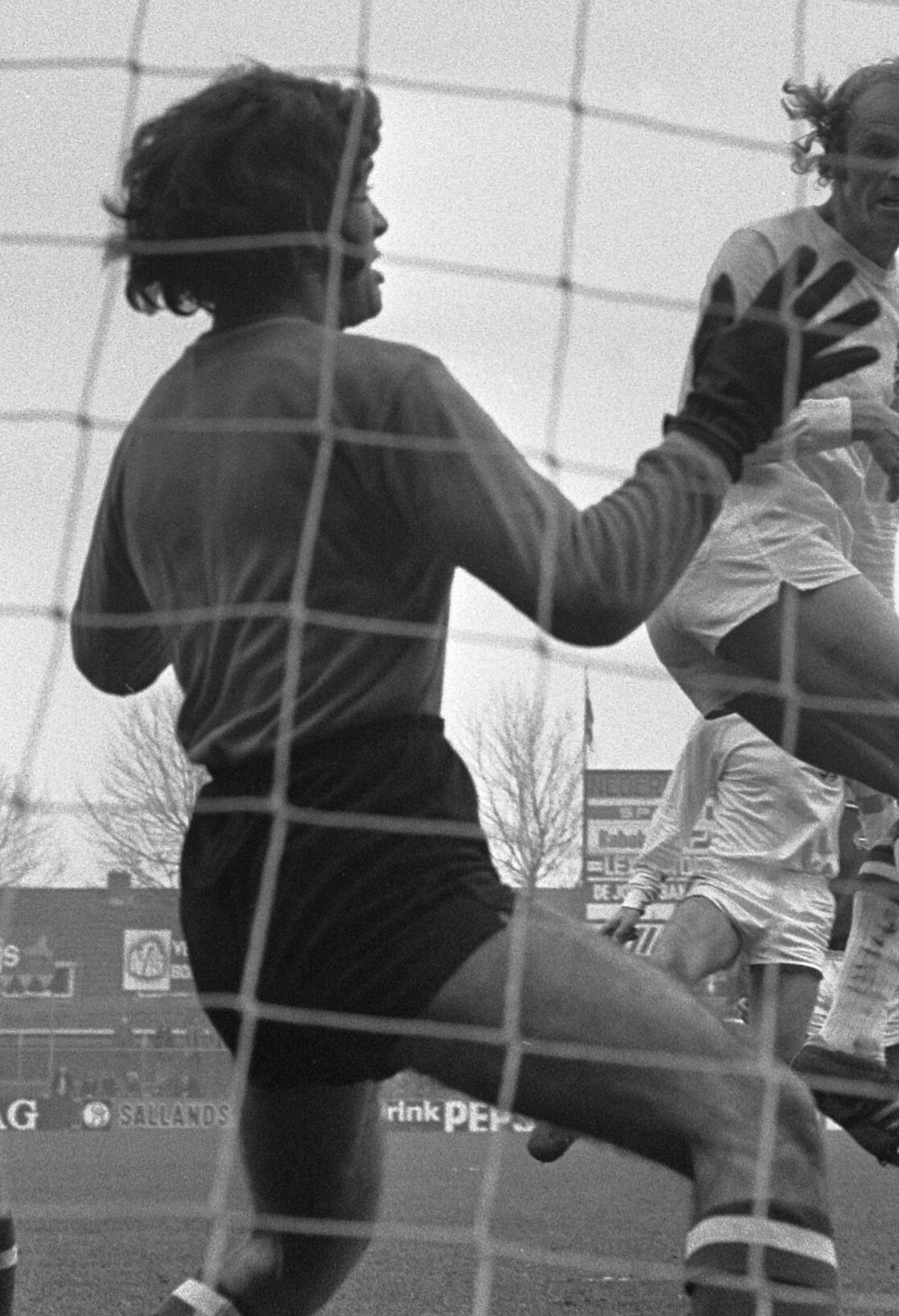
- Kovács playing for Hungary U-23 in 1974

Personal information
- Date of birth: 24 April 1951
- Place of birth: Tatabánya, Hungary
- Date of death: 30 June 2017 (aged 66)
- Place of death: Győr, Hungary
- Position: Goalkeeper

Senior career*
Years	Team	Apps	(Gls)
1972–1980	Videoton FC		
1981–1984	Rába ETO		

International career
1975–1977	Hungary	12	(0)
- * Club domestic league appearances and goals

László Kovács (24 April 1951 – 30 June 2017) was a Hungarian football goalkeeper who was in the squad for Hungary in the 1978 FIFA World Cup. He also played for Videoton FC.
