= Pápai FC =

Hungarian football club

Lombard Pápa
- Full name: Lombard Pápa Termál Futball Club
- Founded: 1995
- Dissolved: 2015 (renamed to Pápai Perutz FC)
- Ground: Perutz Stadion, Pápa
- Capacity: 5,500 (3,108 seated)
- Chairman: Péter Bíró
- Manager: János Mátyus
- League: NB I
- 2014–15: 16th (relegated and folded, new club started from amateur leagues)
Home colours	Away colours

Pápai FC or also known as Lombard FC Pápa was a Hungarian football club based in the town of Pápa, that competed in the Nemzeti Bajnokság I.

== History ==
On 19 June 2014, János Mátyus was appointed as the manager of the club. However, on 5 September 2014, Mátyus resigned.

On 10 November 2014, Ferenc Lengyel was appointed as the manager of the club.

In the 2014–15 Nemzeti Bajnokság I season Pápai FC were relegated.

== Name changes ==
- Pápai Egyesített Labdarúgó Club: 1995 - 2003
- Pápai Termál PELC: 2003 - 2004
- 2004: Lombard FC moves to Pápa
- Lombard Pápa Termál FC: 2004 - 2015

== Honours ==
=== League ===
- Nemzeti Bajnokság II:
  - Runners-up (1): 2008–09

== Seasons ==
The table shows the seasons of Lombard Pápa TFC.

Season	Tier	Club's name	Position	Pts	Manager
1995–96	4	Pápai ELC	1 / 18	82	
1996–97	3	Pápai ELC	15 / 16	20	
1997–98	4	Pápai ELC	13 / 16	30	
1998–99	4	Pápai ELC	2 / 16	53	
1999–00	4	Pápai ELC	1 / 16	69	
2000	2	Pápai ELC	5 / 7	10	
2000–01	2	Pápai ELC	4 / 12	35	
2001–02	2	Pápai ELC	8 / 12	46	
2001–02	2	Pápai ELC	10 / 12	25	
2002–03	2	Pápai ELC	8 / 20	50	
2003–04	2	Pápai Termál PELC	10 / 18	46	
2004–05	1	Lombard Pápa Termál FC	14 / 16	30	
2005–06	1	Lombard Pápa Termál FC	16 / 16	22	
2006–07	2	Lombard Pápa Termál FC	5 / 16	51	
2007–08	2	Lombard Pápa Termál FC	4 / 16	56	
2008–09	2	Lombard Pápa Termál FC	2 / 16	66	
2009–10	1	Lombard Pápa Termál FC	11 / 16	35	
2010–11	1	Lombard Pápa Termál FC	13 / 16	35	
2011–12	1	Lombard Pápa Termál FC	14 / 16	30	
2012–13	1	Lombard Pápa Termál FC	14 / 16	28	
2013–14	1	Lombard Pápa Termál FC	12 / 16	33	
2014–15	1	Lombard Pápa Termál FC	16 / 16	19	Mátyus, Lengyel

== European cup history ==
=== UEFA Intertoto Cup ===
Season	Competition	Round	Country	Club	Home	Away	Aggregate
2005	UEFA Intertoto Cup	1st Round	(Georgia (country))	WIT Georgia	2–1	1–0	3–1
2005	UEFA Intertoto Cup	2nd Round	(Sweden)	IFK Göteborg	2–3	0–1	2–4

== Managers ==
- (Hungary) Bálint Tóth (2004–March 5)
- (Hungary) Lázár Szentes (7 March 2005–November 14, 2005)
- (Hungary) Gyula Zsivóczky (November 2005–December 5)
- (Hungary) György Gálhidi (27 December 2005–March 20, 2006)
- (Hungary) Gyula Zsivóczky (March 2006–October 6)
- (Serbia) Zoran Kuntić (9 October 2006–April 16, 2007)
- (Hungary) József Kiprich (17 April 2007 – 4 March 2008)
- (Hungary) Flórián Urbán (March 2008–September 8)
- (Hungary) László Kovács (September 2008–09)
- (Hungary) György Véber (6 December 2008–October 24, 2011)
- (Hungary) Ferenc Bene (26 October 2011–August 27, 2012)
- (Hungary) László Kovács (interim) (27 August 2012–September 1, 2012)
- (Hungary) Gyula Zsivóczky (1 September 2012–May 6, 2013)
- (Hungary) László Kovács (6 May 2013 – 29 May 2013)
- (Hungary) Bálint Tóth (29 May 2013 – 6 May 2014)
- (Hungary) Mihály Nagy (6 May 2014 – 19 June 2014)
- (Hungary) János Mátyus (1 July 2014–9 November 2014)
- (Hungary) Ferenc Lengyel (10 November 2014)
