= 2012–13 Lombard-Pápa TFC season =

Lombard-Pápa TFC
2012–13 season
- Chairman: (Hungary) Péter Bíró
- Manager: (Hungary) Ferenc Bene (until 27 August 2012) (Hungary) Gyula Zsivóczky (until 6 May 2013) (Hungary) László Kovács (until 27 May 2013) (Hungary) Bálint Tóth
- NB 1: 14.
- Hungarian Cup: 3. round
- Hungarian League Cup: Quarter-final
- Top goalscorer: League: Goran Marić (8); All: Goran Marić (9)
- Highest home attendance: 5,000 v Ferencváros (3 March 2013)
- Lowest home attendance: 200 v Kaposvár (13 November 2012)
Home colours	Away colours

The 2012–13 season will be Lombard-Pápa TFC's 6th competitive season, 4th consecutive season in the OTP Bank Liga and 17th year in existence as a football club.

== First team squad ==
Note: Flags indicate national team as defined under FIFA eligibility rules; some limited exceptions apply. Players may hold more than one non-FIFA nationality.

No.	Pos.	Nation	Player
2	DF	HUN	Sándor Nagy
3	DF	ESP	Daniel Orozco
4	DF	HUN	Gábor Tóth
5	DF	HUN	András Dlusztus
7	FW	HUN	Máté Szolga
9	MF	SRB	Lazar Arsić
10	MF	HUN	Bence Tóth
11	FW	HUN	Gergő Beliczky
14	MF	HUN	Krisztián Dóczi
17	FW	CRO	Tino Lagator
20	DF	HUN	István Rodenbücher

No.	Pos.	Nation	Player
21	FW	SRB	Goran Marić
25	MF	HUN	Béla Maróti
27	GK	HUN	Lajos Szűcs
28	MF	SVK	Otto Szabó
29	DF	HUN	Milán Németh
30	MF	COL	César Quintero
31	FW	HUN	Botond Király
32	DF	HUN	Ádám Présinger
50	MF	CIV	Georges Griffiths (loan from Sparta Prague)
88	DF	HUN	Balázs Balogh
91	MF	HUN	Tamás Tajthy

== Transfers ==
=== Summer ===
In: Note: Flags indicate national team as defined under FIFA eligibility rules; some limited exceptions apply. Players may hold more than one non-FIFA nationality.

No.	Pos.	Nation	Player
7	FW	HUN	András Simon (loan from Győr)
11	MF	HUN	Péter Takács (loan return from Diósgyőr)
19	FW	HUN	Gergő Nagy (from (Austria) Sallingberg)
21	FW	SRB	Goran Marić (from (Kazakhstan) Zhetysu)
24	DF	HUN	Péter Bíró (loan return from Eger)
25	MF	HUN	Béla Maróti (from Ferencváros)
28	MF	SVK	Otto Szabó (from Győr)
45	GK	HUN	Péter Nacsa (loan from Győr)
55	DF	HUN	József Fellai (from Kozármisleny)
77	DF	HUN	Kornél Kaszás (loan return from Pálhalma)
98	MF	MAR	Youssef Sekour (loan from Diósgyőr)
99	FW	LVA	Aleksandrs Čekulajevs (from (Malta) Valletta)
—	MF	HUN	Electo Wilson (from Újpest)

Out: Note: Flags indicate national team as defined under FIFA eligibility rules; some limited exceptions apply. Players may hold more than one non-FIFA nationality.

No.	Pos.	Nation	Player
1	GK	HUN	Tamás Takács (to (Austria) Vornholz)
10	FW	HUN	Gergő Lovrencsics (loan to (Poland) Lech Poznań)
11	FW	HUN	Péter Szilágyi (to Vasas)
11	MF	HUN	Péter Takács (to Diósgyőr)
13	MF	HUN	Gábor Gyömbér (to Ferencváros)
14	MF	HUN	Krisztián Dóczi (loan to BKV Előre)
17	DF	HUN	Attila Farkas (to Nyíregyháza)
19	MF	HUN	Gergő Rása (loan to Vác)
19	FW	HUN	Gergő Nagy (loan to BKV Előre)
24	DF	HUN	Péter Bíró (to (Switzerland) Emmenbrücke)
28	MF	HUN	Zoltán Szabó (to (Austria) Herzogenburg)
42	FW	HUN	Imre Csermelyi
77	DF	HUN	Kornél Kaszás (to Budaörs)
87	MF	FIN	Antonio Inutile (to (Finland) Pallokerho)
—	MF	HUN	Electo Wilson (loan to BKV Előre)

=== Winter ===
In: Note: Flags indicate national team as defined under FIFA eligibility rules; some limited exceptions apply. Players may hold more than one non-FIFA nationality.

No.	Pos.	Nation	Player
3	DF	ESP	Daniel Orozco (from (Greece) Asteras Tripolis)
7	FW	HUN	Máté Szolga (from (Netherlands) Twente U19)
11	FW	HUN	Gergő Beliczky (from Ferencváros)
14	MF	HUN	Krisztián Dóczi (loan return from BKV Előre)
17	FW	CRO	Tino Lagator (from (Lithuania) Atlantas)
23	MF	BIH	Mahir Jasarević (loan from Zalaegerszeg)
50	FW	CIV	Georges Griffiths (loan from (Czech Republic) Sparta Prague)
91	MF	HUN	Tamás Tajthy (from Újpest)

Out: Note: Flags indicate national team as defined under FIFA eligibility rules; some limited exceptions apply. Players may hold more than one non-FIFA nationality.

No.	Pos.	Nation	Player
6	FW	SEN	Mouhamadou Seye (loan to Zalaegerszeg)
7	FW	HUN	András Simon (loan return to Győr)
8	MF	SVN	Jože Benko (to (Slovenia) Zavrč)
13	FW	HUN	István Ferenczi (to Gyirmót)
26	MF	HUN	Levente Horváth
55	DF	HUN	József Fellai (to Kozármisleny)
98	MF	MAR	Youssef Sekour (loan return to Diósgyőr)
99	FW	LVA	Aleksandrs Čekulajevs (to (Thailand) Lopburi)

- List of Hungarian football transfers summer 2012
- List of Hungarian football transfers winter 2012–13

== Statistics ==
=== Appearances and goals ===
Last updated on 2 June 2013.

No.	Pos	Nat	Player	Total		OTP Bank Liga		Hungarian Cup		League Cup	
No.	Pos	Nat	Player	Apps	Goals	Apps	Goals	Apps	Goals	Apps	Goals
2	DF	(Hungary) HUN	Sándor Nagy	22	0	15	0	1	0	6	0
3	DF	(Spain) ESP	Daniel Orozco	7	1	6	0	0	0	1	1
4	DF	(Hungary) HUN	Gábor Tóth	35	1	25	0	2	1	8	0
5	DF	(Hungary) HUN	András Dlusztus	28	1	25	0	2	1	1	0
7	FW	(Hungary) HUN	Máté Szolga	1	0	1	0	0	0	0	0
9	MF	(Serbia) SRB	Lazar Arsić	32	2	26	1	1	0	5	1
10	MF	(Hungary) HUN	Bence Tóth	27	1	20	1	2	0	5	0
11	FW	(Hungary) HUN	Gergő Beliczky	7	0	5	0	0	0	2	0
14	MF	(Hungary) HUN	Krisztián Dóczi	8	0	6	0	0	0	2	0
17	FW	(Croatia) CRO	Tino Lagator	11	1	10	0	0	0	1	1
20	DF	(Hungary) HUN	István Rodenbücher	34	1	27	0	2	0	5	1
21	FW	(Serbia) SRB	Goran Marić	26	9	22	8	1	0	3	1
25	MF	(Hungary) HUN	Béla Maróti	21	2	19	2	0	0	2	0
27	GK	(Hungary) HUN	Lajos Szűcs	35	-51	30	-44	2	-1	3	-6
28	MF	(Slovakia) SVK	Otto Szabó	23	3	20	0	0	0	3	3
29	DF	(Hungary) HUN	Milán Németh	27	1	18	0	2	1	7	0
30	MF	(Colombia) COL	César Quintero	34	3	29	3	1	0	4	0
31	FW	(Hungary) HUN	Botond Király	13	3	7	1	1	1	5	1
32	DF	(Hungary) HUN	Ádám Présinger	25	0	21	0	1	0	3	0
50	MF	(Ivory Coast) CIV	Georges Griffiths	12	3	11	3	0	0	1	0
88	DF	(Hungary) HUN	Balázs Balogh	10	0	8	0	0	0	2	0
91	MF	(Hungary) HUN	Tamás Tajthy	13	0	11	0	0	0	2	0
Youth players:
23	MF	(Bosnia and Herzegovina) BIH	Mahir Jasarević	1	0	0	0	0	0	1	0
33	GK	(Hungary) HUN	Tamás Markek	4	-6	0	0	0	0	4	-6
34	DF	(Hungary) HUN	Bence Grőber	5	1	0	0	2	1	3	0
45	GK	(Hungary) HUN	Péter Nacsa	1	-1	0	0	0	0	1	-1
50	FW	(Nigeria) NGA	Victor Michel	1	0	0	0	0	0	1	0
51	DF	(Hungary) HUN	Richárd Somogyi	1	0	0	0	1	0	0	0
51	FW	(Hungary) HUN	István Eszlátyi	2	0	0	0	0	0	2	0
93	DF	(Hungary) HUN	Marcell Enyingi	1	0	0	0	0	0	1	0
Players out to loan:
6	FW	(Senegal) SEN	Mouhamadou Seye	22	8	16	3	2	2	4	3
Players no longer at the club:
7	FW	(Hungary) HUN	András Simon	9	3	5	0	1	2	3	1
8	FW	(Slovenia) SVN	Jože Benko	15	1	9	1	2	0	4	0
26	MF	(Hungary) HUN	Levente Horváth	11	0	8	0	1	0	2	0
55	DF	(Hungary) HUN	József Fellai	3	0	3	0	0	0	0	0
98	MF	(Morocco) MAR	Youssef Sekour	15	2	10	1	0	0	5	1
99	FW	(Latvia) LVA	Aleksandrs Čekulajevs	10	0	4	0	1	0	5	0

=== Top scorers ===
Includes all competitive matches. The list is sorted by shirt number when total goals are equal.

Last updated on 2 June 2013

Position	Nation	Number	Name	OTP Bank Liga	Hungarian Cup	League Cup	Total
1	(Serbia)	21	Goran Marić	8	0	1	9
2	(Senegal)	6	Mouhamadou Seye	3	2	3	8
3	(Colombia)	30	César Quintero	3	0	0	3
4	(Ivory Coast)	50	Georges Griffiths	3	0	0	3
5	(Hungary)	31	Botond Király	1	1	1	3
6	(Slovakia)	28	Otto Szabó	0	0	3	3
7	(Hungary)	7	András Simon	0	2	1	3
8	(Hungary)	25	Béla Maróti	2	0	0	2
9	(Morocco)	98	Youssef Sekour	1	0	1	2
10	(Serbia)	9	Lazar Arsić	1	0	1	2
11	(Slovenia)	8	Jože Benko	1	0	0	1
12	(Hungary)	10	Bence Tóth	1	0	0	1
13	(Hungary)	4	Gábor Tóth	0	1	0	1
14	(Hungary)	5	András Dlusztus	0	1	0	1
15	(Hungary)	50	Bence Grőber	0	1	0	1
16	(Hungary)	29	Milán Németh	0	1	0	1
17	(Hungary)	20	István Rodenbücher	0	0	1	1
18	(Spain)	3	Daniel Orozco	0	0	1	1
19	(Croatia)	17	Tino Lagator	0	0	1	1
/	/	/	Own Goals	2	0	0	2
			TOTALS	26	9	14	49

=== Disciplinary record ===
Includes all competitive matches. Players with 1 card or more included only.

Last updated on 2 June 2013

Position	Nation	Number	Name	OTP Bank Liga		Hungarian Cup		League Cup		Total (Hu Total)	
Position	Nation	Number	Name	Booked	Sent off (straight red)	Booked	Sent off (straight red)	Booked	Sent off (straight red)	Booked	Sent off (straight red)
DF	(Hungary)	2	Sándor Nagy	2	0	0	0	1	0	3 (2)	0 (0)
DF	(Spain)	3	Daniel Orozco	2	1	0	0	0	0	2 (2)	1 (1)
DF	(Hungary)	4	Gábor Tóth	14	0	1	0	4	0	19 (14)	0 (0)
DF	(Hungary)	5	András Dlusztus	5	1	0	0	1	0	6 (5)	1 (1)
FW	(Senegal)	6	Mouhamadou Seye	2	0	0	0	0	0	2 (2)	0 (0)
FW	(Hungary)	7	András Simon	1	0	0	0	0	0	1 (1)	0 (0)
MF	(Serbia)	9	Lazar Arsić	3	0	0	0	2	0	5 (3)	0 (0)
MF	(Hungary)	10	Bence Tóth	7	0	1	0	1	0	9 (7)	0 (0)
MF	(Hungary)	14	Krisztián Dóczi	0	1	0	0	0	0	0 (0)	1 (1)
FW	(Croatia)	17	Tino Lagator	1	0	0	0	0	0	1 (1)	0 (0)
DF	(Hungary)	20	István Rodenbücher	8	1	1	0	3	1	12 (8)	2 (1)
FW	(Serbia)	21	Goran Marić	11	0	0	0	1	0	11 (10)	0 (0)
MF	(Hungary)	25	Béla Maróti	6	0	0	0	0	0	6 (6)	0 (0)
MF	(Hungary)	26	Levente Horváth	0	1	0	0	0	0	0 (0)	1 (1)
GK	(Hungary)	27	Lajos Szűcs	1	0	0	0	0	0	1 (1)	0 (0)
MF	(Slovakia)	28	Otto Szabó	2	0	0	0	1	0	3 (2)	0 (0)
DF	(Hungary)	29	Milán Németh	2	0	0	0	2	0	4 (2)	0 (0)
MF	(Colombia)	30	César Quintero	7	0	0	0	0	0	7 (7)	0 (0)
FW	(Hungary)	31	Botond Király	0	0	0	0	1	0	1 (0)	0 (0)
DF	(Hungary)	32	Ádám Présinger	8	0	0	0	0	0	8 (8)	0 (0)
MF	(Ivory Coast)	50	Georges Griffiths	1	1	0	0	0	0	1 (1)	1 (1)
DF	(Hungary)	88	Balázs Balogh	1	0	0	0	0	0	1 (1)	0 (0)
MF	(Morocco)	98	Youssef Sekour	2	1	0	0	0	0	2 (2)	1 (1)
			TOTALS	86	7	3	0	17	1	106 (86)	8 (7)

=== Overall ===
Games played	40 (30 OTP Bank Liga, 2 Hungarian Cup and 8 Hungarian League Cup)
Games won	13 (7 OTP Bank Liga, 1 Hungarian Cup and 5 Hungarian League Cup)
Games drawn	7 (7 OTP Bank Liga, 0 Hungarian Cup and 0 Hungarian League Cup)
Games lost	20 (16 OTP Bank Liga, 1 Hungarian Cup and 3 Hungarian League Cup)
Goals scored	49
Goals conceded	60
Goal difference	-11
Yellow cards	106
Red cards	8
Worst discipline	(Hungary) Gábor Tóth (19 (yellow card) , 0 (red card) )
Best result	9–0 (A) v Tapolcai VSE - Hungarian Cup - 25-09-2012
Worst result	0–6 (A) v Győri ETO FC - OTP Bank Liga - 28-09-2012
Most appearances	(Hungary) Gábor Tóth (35 appearances)
Most appearances	(Hungary) Lajos Szűcs (35 appearances)
Top scorer	(Serbia) Goran Marić (9 goal)
Points	46/120 (38.33%)

Last updated: 2 June 2013

== Nemzeti Bajnokság I ==
=== Matches ===
29 July 2012 1	Videoton	1–1	Pápa	Székesfehérvár, Fejér County
18:30 CEST	Nikolić 53'	(Report)	Seye 25'	Stadium: Sóstói Stadion; Attendance: 3,500; Referee: (Hungary) Ádám Radványi

3 August 2012 2	Pápa	0–0	Paks	Pápa, Veszprém County
17:00 CEST		(Report)		Stadium: Stadion Várkerti; Attendance: 2,000; Referee: (Hungary) Gergely Szőts

11 August 2012 3	Ferencváros	4–1	Pápa	Budapest, Pest County
20:45 CEST	Józsi 6', 17' (pen.); Klein 68'; Máté 73'	(Report)	Maróti 9'	Stadium: Stadion Albert Flórián; Attendance: 4,000; Referee: (Hungary) Ádám Németh

19 August 2012 4	Pápa	0–2	MTK Budapest	Pápa, Veszprém County
16:30 CEST		(Report)	Nikházi 85'; Hidvégi 90+5'	Stadium: Stadion Várkerti; Attendance: 400; Referee: (Hungary) István Vad

26 August 2012 5	Debrecen	1–0	Pápa	Debrecen, Hajdú-Bihar County
16:30 CEST	Szakály 77'	(Report)		Stadium: Stadion Oláh Gábor Út; Attendance: 2,500; Referee: (Hungary) János Takács

1 September 2012 6	Pápa	3–0	Kaposvár	Pápa, Veszprém County
18:30 CEST	Seye 43'; Maróti 48'; Sekour 67'	(Report)		Stadium: Stadion Várkerti; Attendance: 1,800; Referee: (Hungary) József Erdős

15 September 2012 7	Kecskemét	1–2	Pápa	Kecskemét, Bács-Kiskun County
16:00 CEST	Litsingi 11'	(Report)	Marić 41', 81' (pen.)	Stadium: Széktói Stadion; Attendance: 1,000; Referee: (Hungary) Péter Solymosi

22 September 2012 8	Pápa	1–2	Pécs	Pápa, Veszprém County
18:30 CEST	Benko 90'	(Report)	Krejčí 9'; Bajzát 84'	Stadium: Stadion Várkerti; Attendance: 1,500; Referee: (Hungary) József Berger

28 September 2012 9	Győr	6–0	Pápa	Győr, Győr-Moson-Sopron County
17:00 CEST	Kronaveter 15', 85'; Varga 34', 38', 62'; Koltai 56'	(Report)		Stadium: ETO Park; Attendance: 3,200; Referee: (Hungary) Sándor Andó-Szabó

6 October 2012 10	Újpest	1–1	Pápa	Budapest, Pest County
14:00 CEST	Kabát 22'	(Report)	Aarab 78' (o.g.)	Stadium: Szusza Ferenc Stadium; Attendance: 3,422; Referee: (Hungary) Balázs Berke

20 October 2012 11	Pápa	2–1	Budapest Honvéd	Pápa, Veszprém County
14:00 CEST	Marić 42', 89' (pen.)	(Report)	Diaby 32'	Stadium: Stadion Várkerti; Attendance: 1,000; Referee: (Hungary) Balázs Böcskei

26 October 2012 12	Eger	1–1	Pápa	Debrecen, Hajdú-Bihar County
19:00 CEST	Farkas 29'	(Report)	Knakal 33' (o.g.)	Stadium: Stadion Oláh Gábor Út; Attendance: 100; Referee: (Hungary) Dániel Becséri

3 November 2012 13	Pápa	1–0	Szombathely	Pápa, Veszprém County
16:00 CET	Marić 29' (pen.)	(Report)		Stadium: Stadion Várkerti; Attendance: 3,200; Referee: (Hungary) Roland Veizer

9 November 2012 14	Siófok	1–0	Pápa	Siófok, Somogy County
19:00 CET	Nyári 8'	(Report)		Stadium: Révész Street Stadium; Attendance: 300; Referee: (Hungary) József Erdős

16 November 2012 15	Pápa	2–2	Diósgyőr	Pápa, Veszprém County
17:00 CET	Marić 61' (pen.), 90+4' (pen.)	(Report)	Tisza 25' (pen.), 30' (pen.)	Stadium: Stadion Várkerti; Attendance: 1,000; Referee: (Hungary) Zoltán Iványi

25 November 2012 16	Pápa	1–0	Videoton	Pápa, Veszprém County
18:30 CET	Seye 39'	(Report)		Stadium: Stadion Várkerti; Attendance: 800; Referee: (Hungary) János Takács

30 November 2012 17	Paks	2–0	Pápa	Paks, Tolna County
19:00 CET	Eppel 31'; Tököli 84'	(Report)		Stadium: Stadion PSE; Attendance: 750; Referee: (Hungary) Dániel Becséri

3 March 2013 18	Pápa	0–3	Ferencváros	Pápa, Veszprém County
16:30 CET		(Report)	Jenner 17'; Aborah 23'; Böde 84'	Stadium: Stadion Várkerti; Attendance: 5,000; Referee: (Hungary) Ádám Farkas

9 March 2013 19	MTK Budapest	2–0	Pápa	Budapest, Pest County
16:00 CET	Wolfe 52'; Hidvégi 84'	(Report)		Stadium: Hidegkuti Nándor Stadium; Attendance: 800; Referee: (Hungary) József Berger

10 April 2013 20	Pápa	1–0	Debrecen	Pápa, Veszprém County
18:00 CEST	Tóth 65'	(Report)		Stadium: Stadion Várkerti; Attendance: 800; Referee: (Hungary) Gábor Oláh

29 March 2013 21	Kaposvár	3–0	Pápa	Kaposvár, Somogy County
17:00 CET	Waltner 81'; Oláh 84' (pen.); Balázs 90+1'	(Report)		Stadium: Stadion Kaposvár Rákóczi; Attendance: 1,000; Referee: (Hungary) Sándor Andó-Szabó

6 April 2013 22	Pápa	0–2	Kecskemét	Pápa, Veszprém County
16:00 CEST		(Report)	Balázs 72'; Salami 85'	Stadium: Stadion Várkerti; Attendance: 500; Referee: (Hungary) Viktor Kassai

13 April 2013 23	Pécs	2–0	Pápa	Pécs, Baranya County
16:00 CEST	Čaušić 27'; Lázár 67'	(Report)		Stadium: Stadion PMFC; Attendance: 600; Referee: (Hungary) Zoltán Iványi

20 April 2013 24	Pápa	1–1	Győr	Pápa, Veszprém County
18:30 CEST	Griffiths 90'	(Report)	Trajković 16'	Stadium: Stadion Várkerti; Attendance: 3,300; Referee: (Hungary) István Vad

27 April 2013 25	Pápa	0–1	Újpest	Pápa, Veszprém County
16:00 CEST		(Report)	Antón 80'	Stadium: Stadion Várkerti; Attendance: 2,700; Referee: (Hungary) Gábor Oláh

4 May 2013 26	Budapest Honvéd	2–0	Pápa	Budapest, Pest County
16:00 CEST	Délczeg 45'; Nagy 81'	(Report)		Stadium: Bozsik Stadion; Referee: (Hungary) József Erdős

11 May 2013 27	Pápa	6–1	Eger	Pápa, Veszprém County
14:00 CEST	Griffiths 17'; Quintero 22', 77'; Marić 26'; Arsić 33'; Király 90'	(Report)	Horváth 71'	Stadium: Stadion Várkerti; Attendance: 500; Referee: (Hungary) Roland Veizer

17 May 2013 28	Haladás	2–1	Pápa	Szombathely, Vas County
17:00 CEST	Kalász 54'; Radó 88' (pen.)	(Report)	Quintero 21'	Stadium: Rohonci úti Stadion; Attendance: 1,950; Referee: (Hungary) Zoltán Iványi

24 May 2013 29	Pápa	0–1	Siófok	Pápa, Veszprém County
19:00 CEST		(Report)	Takács 57'	Stadium: Stadion Várkerti; Attendance: 2,000; Referee: (Hungary) István Vad

2 June 2013 30	Diósgyőr	1–1	Pápa	Miskolc, Borsod-Abaúj-Zemplén County
16:30 CEST	Kádár 90'	(Report)	Griffiths 83'	Stadium: DVTK Stadion; Attendance: 7,715; Referee: (Hungary) Sándor Andó-Szabó

=== Classification ===
Pos	Team	Pld	W	D	L	GF	GA	GD	Pts	Qualification or relegation
12	Pécs	30	10	7	13	33	44	−11	37	
13	Paks	30	8	11	11	40	38	+2	35	
14	Pápa	30	7	7	16	26	46	−20	28	
15	Siófok (R)	30	7	4	19	31	61	−30	25	Relegation to Nemzeti Bajnokság II
16	Eger (R)	30	3	6	21	25	67	−42	15	Relegation to Nemzeti Bajnokság II

Source: mlsz.hu (in Hungarian)
Rules for classification: 1st points; 2nd overall wins; 3rd goal difference; 4th head-to-head points; 5th head-to-head goal difference; 6th head-to-head away goals scored; 7th fair-play points; 8th drawing of lots
(R) Relegated

=== Results summary ===
Overall								Home						Away					
Pld	W	D	L	GF	GA	GD	Pts	W	D	L	GF	GA	GD	W	D	L	GF	GA	GD
30	7	7	16	27	46	−19	28	6	3	6	18	16	+2	1	4	10	9	30	−21

Last updated: 2 June 2013.
Source: NB1

=== Results by round ===
Round	1	2	3	4	5	6	7	8	9	10	11	12	13	14	15	16	17	18	19	20	21	22	23	24	25	26	27	28	29	30
Ground	A	H	A	H	A	H	A	H	A	A	H	A	H	A	H	H	A	H	A	H	A	H	A	H	H	A	H	A	H	A
Result	D	D	L	L	L	W	W	L	L	D	W	D	W	L	D	W	L	L	L	W	L	L	L	D	L	L	W	L	L	D
Position	7	10	13	14	15	14 October 2012	15	15	13	13 December 2013	13 December 2013	14	14 December 2014	14	14	14	14	14	14	14	14	14								

Updated to match(es) played on 2 June 2013. Source: Matches
A = Away; H = Home; W = Win; D = Draw; L = Loss

== Hungarian Cup ==
25 September 2012 Round 2	Tapolca	0–9	Pápa	Tapolca
15:30 CEST		(Report)	Tóth 8'; Dlusztus 28'; Seye 35', 72'; Simon 43', 45'; Király 52'; Grőber 67'; Németh 90'	Stadium: Városi Sporttelep; Attendance: 200; Referee: (Hungary) Gábor Barna

28 October 2012 Round 3	Létavértes	1–0	Pápa	Létavértes
12:30 CET	Hajdu 90+2'	(Report)		Stadium: Városi Sporttelep; Attendance: 600; Referee: (Hungary) Ferenc Karakó

== League Cup ==
=== Group stage ===
5 September 2012 1	Pápa	2–1	Zalaegerszeg	Pápa, Veszprém County
17:00 CEST	Simon 9'; Szabó 18'	(Report)	Máté 3'	Stadium: Stadion Várkerti; Attendance: 250; Referee: (Hungary) Tibor Farkas

8 September 2012 2	Videoton	2–0	Pápa	Székesfehérvár, Fejér County
18:00 CEST	Neto 30'; Nikolić 58'	(Report)		Stadium: Sóstói Stadion; Attendance: 1,300; Referee: (Hungary) Norbert Kiss

10 October 2012 3	Pápa	2–1	Kaposvár	Pápa, Veszprém County
16:00 CEST	Seye 58', 67'	(Report)	Katona 79' (pen.)	Stadium: Stadion Várkerti; Attendance: 200; Referee: (Hungary) Gábor Oláh

7 December 2012 4	Kaposvár	2–1	Pápa	Kaposvár, Somogy County
13:00 CET	Bőle 50' (pen.); Horváth 59'	(Report)	Rodenbücher 12' (pen.)	Stadium: Stadion Kaposvár Rákóczi; Attendance: 150; Referee: (Hungary) Csaba Pintér

13 November 2012 5	Pápa	2–1	Kaposvár	Pápa, Veszprém County
16:00 CET	Seye 72'; Szabó 76'	(Report)	Paraiba 7'	Stadium: Stadion Várkerti; Attendance: 200; Referee: (Hungary) István Vad

4 December 2012 6	Zalaegerszeg	1–2	Pápa	Zalaegerszeg, Zala County
13:00 CET	Bíró 59'	(Report)	Sekour 43'; Király 54'	Stadium: ZTE Arena; Attendance: 100; Referee: (Hungary) Zoltán J. Kovács

==== Classification ====
Pos	Team	Pld	W	D	L	GF	GA	GD	Pts	Qualification
1	Videoton	6	4	1	1	9	3	+6	13	Advance to knockout phase
2	Pápa	6	4	0	2	9	8	+1	12	Advance to knockout phase
3	Kaposvár	6	1	2	3	6	8	−2	5	
4	Zalaegerszeg	6	1	1	4	5	10	−5	4	

Rules for classification: 1) points; 2) goal difference; 3) number of goals scored.

=== Knockout phase ===
20 February 2013 Quarter-final (1st leg)	Ferencváros	3–1	Pápa	Budapest, Pest County
16:00 CET	Józsi 40'; Jenner 42'; Böde 50'	(Report)	Marić 57'	Stadium: Stadio Albert Flórián; Attendance: 1,200; Referee: (Hungary) Sándor Andó-Szabó

6 February 2013 Quarter-final (2nd leg)	Pápa	4–2 (5–5 (a) agg.)	Ferencváros	Pápa, Veszprém County
17:00	Arsić 30'; Orozco 64'; Lagator 89'; Szabó 117'	(Report)	Böde 53'; Čukić 93'	Stadium: Stadion Várkerti; Attendance: 1,200; Referee: (Hungary) Ádám Radványi
