= 2011–12 Lombard-Pápa TFC season =

Lombard-Pápa TFC
2011–12 season
- Chairman: (Hungary) Péter Bíró
- Manager: (Hungary) György Véber (until 24 October 2011) (Hungary) Ferenc Bene
- NB 1: 14.
- Hungarian Cup: 4. Round
- Hungarian League Cup: Semi-final
- Top goalscorer: League: (Hungary) Gergő Lovrencsics (7); All: (Hungary) István Ferenczi (13)
- Highest home attendance: 4,500 v FTC (16 October 2011)
- Lowest home attendance: 100 v ZTE (9 November 2011)
Home colours	Away colours

The 2011–12 season will be Lombard-Pápa TFC's 5th competitive season, 3rd consecutive season in the OTP Bank Liga and 16th year in existence as a football club.

== First team squad ==
Note: Flags indicate national team as defined under FIFA eligibility rules; some limited exceptions apply. Players may hold more than one non-FIFA nationality.

No.	Pos.	Nation	Player
2	DF	HUN	Sándor Nagy
4	MF	HUN	Gábor Tóth
5	DF	HUN	András Dlusztus
6	FW	SEN	Mouhamadou Seye
7	MF	HUN	Bence Tóth
8	FW	SLO	Jože Benko
9	MF	SRB	Lazar Arsić
10	FW	HUN	Gergő Lovrencsics
11	FW	HUN	Péter Szilágyi (loan from Debreceni VSC)
13	MF	HUN	Gábor Gyömbér
14	MF	HUN	Krisztián Dóczi
17	DF	HUN	Attila Farkas
19	MF	HUN	Gergő Rása

No.	Pos.	Nation	Player
20	DF	HUN	István Rodenbücher
22	FW	HUN	Tamás Csepregi
23	DF	HUN	Balázs Balogh
26	DF	HUN	Levente Horváth
27	GK	HUN	Lajos Szűcs
28	MF	HUN	Zoltán Szabó
29	FW	HUN	Milán Németh
30	DF	COL	César Quintero
32	DF	HUN	Ádám Présinger
42	FW	HUN	Imre Csermelyi
50	DF	HUN	Marcell Enyingi
87	MF	FIN	Antonio Inutile

== Transfers ==
=== Summer ===
In: Note: Flags indicate national team as defined under FIFA eligibility rules; some limited exceptions apply. Players may hold more than one non-FIFA nationality.

No.	Pos.	Nation	Player
7	MF	GEO	George Ganugrava (loan from Győri ETO FC)
9	FW	HUN	Tamás German (loan return from Nyíregyháza Spartacus FC)
10	FW	HUN	Gergő Lovrencsics (from Pécsi Mecsek FC)
13	FW	HUN	István Ferenczi (from Vasas SC)
19	MF	HUN	Gergő Rása (from Videoton FC)
20	DF	HUN	István Rodenbücher (from Ferencvárosi TC)
22	DF	GEO	Lasha Totadze (loan from Győri ETO FC)
26	DF	HUN	Levente Horváth (from Nyíregyháza Spartacus FC)
28	MF	HUN	Zoltán Szabó (from (Austria) SC Herzogenburg)
29	FW	HUN	Kristóf Urbányi (from (Portugal) Portimonense S.C.)
32	DF	HUN	Ádám Présinger (from Videoton FC)
88	MF	EST	Sander Puri (loan from (Greece) AEL)
––	FW	SRB	Nenad Puhalak (from (Serbia) FK Spartak Zlatibor Voda)
––	FW	NGR	Joseph Bala (from (Nigeria) Abuja F.C.)

Out: Note: Flags indicate national team as defined under FIFA eligibility rules; some limited exceptions apply. Players may hold more than one non-FIFA nationality.

No.	Pos.	Nation	Player
6	MF	HUN	Balázs Venczel (unattached)
8	MF	HUN	Norbert Heffler (to Paksi SE)
9	FW	HUN	Zsolt Szabó (to Rákospalotai EAC)
10	FW	NGR	David Solomon Abwo (to (Poland) Zagłębie Lubin)
11	MF	HUN	Péter Takács (loan to Diósgyőri VTK)
14	DF	HUN	Attila Rajnay (to Újbudai TC)
17	FW	UKR	Denys Rebryk (to BFC Siófok)
19	MF	HUN	Zsolt Bárányos (to Vasas SC)
20	MF	HUN	Norbert Tóth (to Törökbálint)
24	DF	HUN	Péter Bíró (loan to Egri FC)
26	DF	BIH	Zoran Šupić (loan return to Győri ETO FC)
39	FW	HUN	Péter Bali (to BFC Siófok)

=== Winter ===
In: Note: Flags indicate national team as defined under FIFA eligibility rules; some limited exceptions apply. Players may hold more than one non-FIFA nationality.

No.	Pos.	Nation	Player
6	FW	SEN	Mouhamadou Seye (from (Greece) Panetolikos F.C.)
7	MF	HUN	Bence Tóth (from Ferencvárosi TC)
8	FW	SLO	Jože Benko (from (China) Wuhan Zall F.C.)
9	DF	SRB	Lazar Arsić (from Vasas SC)
11	FW	HUN	Péter Szilágyi (on loan from Debreceni VSC)
23	DF	HUN	Balázs Balogh (from (Finland) Kuopion Palloseura)
42	FW	HUN	Imre Csermelyi (from BFC Siófok)
87	FW	FIN	Antonio Inutile (from (Finland) Vaasan Palloseura)

Out: Note: Flags indicate national team as defined under FIFA eligibility rules; some limited exceptions apply. Players may hold more than one non-FIFA nationality.

No.	Pos.	Nation	Player
7	MF	GEO	Giorgi Ganugrava (loan return to Győri ETO FC)
9	FW	HUN	Tamás Germán (to Nyíregyháza Spartacus)
13	FW	HUN	István Ferenczi (to Gyirmót SE)
15	MF	LAT	Vadims Žuļevs
18	DF	HUN	Gábor Varga (to Vasas SC)
21	FW	SRB	Goran Marić (to (Kazakhstan) FC Zhetysu)
22	DF	GEO	Lasha Totadze (loan return to Győri ETO FC)
33	GK	HUN	Vilmos Kovács (to Nyúl SC)
77	DF	HUN	Kornél Kaszás (on loan to Dunaújváros Pálhalma SE)
88	MF	EST	Sander Puri (loan return to (Greece) AEL)

- List of Hungarian football transfer summer 2011
- List of Hungarian football transfers winter 2011–12

== Statistics ==
=== Appearances and goals ===
Last updated on 27 May 2012.

No.	Pos	Nat	Player	Total		OTP Bank Liga		Hungarian Cup		League Cup	
No.	Pos	Nat	Player	Apps	Goals	Apps	Goals	Apps	Goals	Apps	Goals
2	DF	(Hungary) HUN	Sándor Nagy	34	0	26	0	1	0	7	0
4	MF	(Hungary) HUN	Gábor Tóth	32	3	22	1	1	0	9	2
5	DF	(Hungary) HUN	András Dlusztus	8	1	6	1	1	0	1	0
6	FW	(Senegal) SEN	Mouhamadou Seye	11	2	9	2	0	0	2	0
7	MF	(Hungary) HUN	Bence Tóth	4	0	2	0	0	0	2	0
8	FW	(Slovenia) SLO	Jože Benko	7	2	6	1	0	0	1	1
9	MF	(Serbia) SRB	Lazar Arsić	17	0	13	0	0	0	4	0
10	FW	(Hungary) HUN	Gergő Lovrencsics	41	11	30	7	2	0	9	4
11	FW	(Hungary) HUN	Péter Szilágyi	14	0	10	0	0	0	4	0
13	MF	(Hungary) HUN	Gábor Gyömbér	15	0	12	0	0	0	3	0
14	MF	(Hungary) HUN	Krisztián Dóczi	8	0	5	0	0	0	3	0
17	DF	(Hungary) HUN	Attila Farkas	27	2	20	1	2	1	5	0
19	MF	(Hungary) HUN	Gergő Rása	6	0	2	0	0	0	4	0
20	DF	(Hungary) HUN	István Rodenbücher	28	0	19	0	2	0	7	0
22	FW	(Hungary) HUN	Tamás Csepregi	5	0	1	0	0	0	4	0
23	DF	(Hungary) HUN	Balázs Balogh	9	0	7	0	0	0	2	0
26	DF	(Hungary) HUN	Levente Horváth	32	0	24	0	2	0	6	0
27	GK	(Hungary) HUN	Lajos Szűcs	40	-45	30	-40	2	-1	8	-4
28	MF	(Hungary) HUN	Zoltán Szabó	15	3	7	0	1	1	7	2
29	FW	(Hungary) HUN	Milán Németh	27	0	17	0	1	0	9	0
30	DF	(Colombia) COL	César Quintero	30	2	20	0	1	2	9	0
32	DF	(Hungary) HUN	Ádám Présinger	28	1	19	1	1	0	8	0
42	FW	(Hungary) HUN	Imre Csermelyi	5	0	2	0	0	0	3	0
50	DF	(Hungary) HUN	Marcell Enyingi	4	0	1	0	0	0	3	0
87	MF	(Finland) FIN	Antonio Inutile	12	0	9	0	0	0	3	0
Youth players
1	GK	(Hungary) HUN	Tamás Takács	2	-4	0	0	0	0	2	-4
5	DF	(Hungary) HUN	Balázs Karácsony	1	0	0	0	0	0	1	0
29	FW	(Hungary) HUN	Kristóf Urbányi	1	0	0	0	0	0	1	0
Players currently out on loan
77	DF	(Hungary) HUN	Kornél Kaszás	3	0	0	0	0	0	3	0
Players no longer at the club
7	MF	(Georgia (country)) GEO	George Ganugrava	20	1	17	1	2	0	1	0
9	FW	(Hungary) HUN	Tamás Germán	15	0	9	0	1	0	5	0
13	FW	(Hungary) HUN	István Ferenczi	23	13	16	4	2	4	5	5
15	MF	(Latvia) LAT	Vadims Žuļevs	14	2	8	0	1	0	5	2
18	DF	(Hungary) HUN	Gábor Varga	13	1	7	0	0	0	6	1
21	FW	(Serbia) SRB	Goran Marić	20	9	14	6	2	2	4	1
22	DF	(Georgia (country)) GEO	Lasha Totadze	17	0	14	0	1	0	2	0
88	MF	(Estonia) EST	Sander Puri	14	1	12	0	2	1	0	0

=== Top scorers ===
Includes all competitive matches. The list is sorted by shirt number when total goals are equal.

Last updated on 27 May 2012

Position	Nation	Number	Name	OTP Bank Liga	Hungarian Cup	League Cup	Total
1	(Hungary)	13	István Ferenczi	4	4	5	13
2	(Hungary)	10	Gergő Lovrencsics	7	0	4	11
3	(Serbia) (Spain)	21	Goran Marić	6	2	1	9
4	(Hungary)	4	Gábor Tóth	1	0	2	3
5	(Hungary)	28	Zoltán Szabó	0	1	2	3
6	(Senegal)	6	Mouhamadou Seye	2	0	0	2
7	(Hungary)	17	Attila Farkas	1	1	0	2
8	(Slovenia)	8	Jože Benko	1	0	1	2
9	(Colombia)	30	César Quintero	0	2	0	2
10	(Latvia)	15	Vadims Žuļevs	0	0	2	2
11	(Georgia (country))	7	George Ganugrava	1	0	0	1
12	(Hungary)	5	András Dlusztus	1	0	0	1
13	(Hungary)	32	Ádám Présinger	1	0	0	1
14	(Estonia)	88	Sander Puri	0	1	0	1
15	(Hungary)	18	Gábor Varga	0	0	1	1
/	/	/	Own Goals	1	0	0	1
			TOTALS	25	11	18	54

=== Disciplinary record ===
Includes all competitive matches. Players with 1 card or more included only.

Last updated on 27 May 2012

Position	Nation	Number	Name	OTP Bank Liga		Hungarian Cup		League Cup		Total (Hu Total)	
Position	Nation	Number	Name	Booked	Sent off (straight red)	Booked	Sent off (straight red)	Booked	Sent off (straight red)	Booked	Sent off (straight red)
DF	(Hungary)	2	Sándor Nagy	3	0	0	0	1	0	4 (3)	0 (0)
MF	(Hungary)	4	Gábor Tóth	6	1	1	0	1	0	8 (6)	1 (1)
DF	(Hungary)	5	András Dlusztus	1	0	0	0	0	0	1 (1)	0 (0)
FW	(Senegal)	6	Mouhamadou Seye	1	0	0	0	0	0	1 (1)	0 (0)
MF	(Georgia (country))	7	George Ganugrava	3	0	0	0	0	0	3 (3)	0 (0)
FW	(Slovenia)	8	Jože Benko	1	0	0	0	0	0	1 (1)	0 (0)
MF	(Serbia)	9	Lazar Arsić	3	0	0	0	0	0	3 (3)	0 (0)
FW	(Hungary)	9	Tamás Germán	0	0	0	0	2	0	2 (0)	0 (0)
FW	(Hungary)	10	Gergő Lovrencsics	1	0	0	0	1	0	2 (1)	0 (0)
MF	(Hungary)	13	Gábor Gyömbér	1	0	0	0	0	0	1 (1)	0 (0)
FW	(Hungary)	13	István Ferenczi	1	0	0	0	1	0	2 (1)	0 (0)
MF	(Hungary)	14	Krisztián Dóczi	0	0	0	0	1	0	1 (0)	0 (0)
MF	(Latvia)	15	Vadims Žuļevs	1	0	0	0	0	0	1 (1)	0 (0)
DF	(Hungary)	17	Attila Farkas	8	0	0	0	1	0	9 (8)	0 (0)
DF	(Hungary)	18	Gábor Varga	2	0	0	0	2	0	4 (2)	0 (0)
MF	(Hungary)	19	Gergő Rása	1	0	0	0	0	0	1 (1)	0 (0)
DF	(Hungary)	20	István Rodenbücher	9	0	0	0	1	2	10 (9)	2 (0)
FW	(Serbia) (Spain)	21	Goran Marić	5	0	0	1	2	0	7 (5)	1 (0)
DF	(Georgia (country))	22	Lasha Totadze	5	0	0	0	0	0	5 (5)	0 (0)
DF	(Hungary)	23	Balázs Balogh	2	0	0	0	1	0	3 (2)	0 (0)
DF	(Hungary)	26	Levente Horváth	5	0	1	0	1	1	7 (5)	1 (0)
GK	(Hungary)	27	Lajos Szűcs	1	0	0	0	0	0	1 (1)	0 (0)
MF	(Hungary)	28	Zoltán Szabó	0	0	0	0	1	0	1 (0)	0 (0)
DF	(Hungary)	29	Milán Németh	2	0	0	0	0	0	2 (2)	0 (0)
DF	(Colombia)	30	César Quintero	3	0	0	0	0	0	3 (3)	0 (0)
DF	(Hungary)	32	Ádám Présinger	3	1	1	0	1	0	5 (3)	1 (1)
MF	(Estonia)	88	Sander Puri	1	1	0	0	0	0	1 (1)	1 (1)
			TOTALS	69	3	3	1	17	3	89 (69)	7 (3)

=== Overall ===
Games played	42 (30 OTP Bank Liga, 2 Hungarian Cup and 10 Hungarian League Cup)
Games won	14 (8 OTP Bank Liga, 1 Hungarian Cup and 5 Hungarian League Cup)
Games drawn	9 (6 OTP Bank Liga, 1 Hungarian Cup and 2 Hungarian League Cup)
Games lost	19 (16 OTP Bank Liga, 0 Hungarian Cup and 3 Hungarian League Cup)
Goals scored	55
Goals conceded	48
Goal difference	+7
Yellow cards	89
Red cards	7
Worst discipline	(Hungary) István Rodenbücher (10 (yellow card) , 2 (red card) )
Best result	10–0 (A) v Győrszemere KSK - Hungarian Cup - 21-09-2011
Worst result	0–3 (A) v Kecskeméti TE - OTP Bank Liga - 22-10-2011
Worst result	0–3 (H) v Videoton FC - Ligakupa - 27-03-2012
Most appearances	(Hungary) Gergő Lovrencsics (41 appearances)
Top scorer	(Hungary) István Ferenczi (13 goals)
Points	51/126 (40.48%)

Last updated: 27 May 2012

== Nemzeti Bajnokság I ==
=== Matches ===
16 July 2011 1	Újpest FC	0–1	Lombard-Pápa TFC	Budapest, Pest County
20:00 CET (UTC+01)		(Report)	Marić 81'	Stadium: Szusza Ferenc Stadium; Attendance: 4,000; Referee: (Hungary) Gábor Oláh

23 July 2011 2	Lombard-Pápa TFC	2–0	BFC Siófok	Pápa, Veszprém County
19:00 CET (UTC+01)	Marić 47' 78'	(Report)		Stadium: Stadion Várkerti; Attendance: 2,000; Referee: (Hungary) János Takács

31 July 2011 3	Paksi SE	1–1	Lombard-Pápa TFC	Paks, Tolna County
19:00 CET (UTC+01)	Vayer 53'	(Report)	Marić 29'	Stadium: Stadion PSE; Attendance: 1,800; Referee: (Hungary) Balázs Böcskei

6 August 2011 4	Lombard-Pápa TFC	1–0	Kaposvári Rákóczi FC	Pápa, Veszprém County
19:00 CET (UTC+01)	Lovrencsics 42'	(Report)		Stadium: Stadion Várkerti; Attendance: 2,000; Referee: (Hungary) Ádám Radványi

13 August 2011 5	Diósgyőri VTK	2–0	Lombard-Pápa TFC	Miskolc, Borsod-Abaúj-Zemplén County
19:00 CET (UTC+01)	Budovinszky 47'; Seydi 78'	(Report)		Stadium: DVTK Stadion; Attendance: 6,000; Referee: (Hungary) Roland Veizer

20 August 2011 6	Lombard-Pápa TFC	0–2	Debreceni VSC	Pápa, Veszprém County
15:00 CET (UTC+01)		(Report)	Bódi 45'; Nikolić 60'	Stadium: Stadion Várkerti; Attendance: 1,800; Referee: (Hungary) Gábor Oláh

27 August 2011 7	Pécsi Mecsek FC	2–1	Lombard-Pápa TFC	Pécs, Baranya County
19:00 CET (UTC+01)	Horváth 38'; Frőhlich 45'	(Report)	Ganugrava 12'	Stadium: Stadion PMFC; Attendance: 4,000; Referee: (Hungary) Ádám Farkas

11 September 2011 8	Lombard-Pápa TFC	3–1	Budapest Honvéd FC	Pápa, Veszprém County
19:00 CET (UTC+01)	Ferenczi 58'; Botis 64' (o.g.); Lovrencsics 75'	(Report)	Hajdú 30'	Stadium: Stadion Várkerti; Attendance: 2,200; Referee: (Chile) Alvaro Miquel Garcia

17 September 2011 9	Szombathelyi Haladás	2–1	Lombard-Pápa TFC	Szombathely, Vas County
19:00 CET (UTC+01)	Kovács 87'; Kenesei 90+2'	(Report)	Ferenczi 53'	Stadium: Rohonci Street Stadium; Attendance: 6,000; Referee: (Hungary) József Berger

24 September 2011 10	Lombard-Pápa TFC	0–0	Vasas SC	Pápa, Veszprém County
18:00 CET (UTC+01)		(Report)		Stadium: Stadion Várkerti; Attendance: 2,000; Referee: (Hungary) Ádám Németh

1 October 2011 11	Zalaegerszegi TE	1–1	Lombard-Pápa TFC	Zalaegerszeg, Zala County
18:00 CET (UTC+01)	Turkovs 39'	(Report)	Dlusztus 32'	Stadium: ZTE Arena; Attendance: 2,000; Referee: (Hungary) Zoltán J. Kovács

16 October 2011 12	Lombard-Pápa TFC	1–2	Ferencvárosi TC	Pápa, Veszprém County
18:00 CET (UTC+01)	Marić 47'	(Report)	Somália 54'; Klein 74'	Stadium: Stadion Várkerti; Attendance: 4,500; Referee: (Hungary) Mihály Fábián

22 October 2011 13	Kecskeméti TE	3–0	Lombard-Pápa TFC	Kecskemét, Bács-Kiskun County
17:30 CET (UTC+01)	Stokić 18'; Bori 33'; Savić 64' (pen.)	(Report)		Stadium: Széktói Stadion; Attendance: 2,500; Referee: (Hungary) Zoltán Iványi

29 October 2011 14	Lombard-Pápa TFC	2–3	Videoton FC	Pápa, Veszprém County
15:00 CET (UTC+01)	Marić 59'; Ferenczi 67'	(Report)	Alves 65' 77'; Nikolić 81'	Stadium: Stadion Várkerti; Attendance: 1,500; Referee: (Hungary) Ádám Németh

4 November 2011 15	Győri ETO FC	3–2	Lombard-Pápa TFC	Győr, Győr-Moson-Sopron County
18:00 CET (UTC+01)	Ahjupera 26'; Trajković 42'; Koltai 62'	(Report)	Ferenczi 66' (pen.); Lovrencsics 79'	Stadium: ETO Park; Attendance: 2,000; Referee: (Hungary) Viktor Kassai

18 November 2011 16	Lombard-Pápa TFC	0–1	Újpest FC	Pápa, Veszprém County
18:00 CET (UTC+01)		(Report)	Lázár 68'	Stadium: Stadion Várkerti; Attendance: 1,200; Referee: (Hungary) István Vad

26 November 2011 17	BFC Siófok	3–1	Lombard-Pápa TFC	Siófok, Somogy County
16:00 CET (UTC+01)	Melczer 27'; Présinger 68' (o.g.); Tusori 79'	(Report)	Présinger 37'	Stadium: Révész Street Stadium; Attendance: 500; Referee: (Hungary) Mihály Fábián

3 March 2012 18	Lombard-Pápa TFC	1–0	Paksi SE	Pápa, Veszprém County
17:00 CET (UTC+01)	Seye 36'	(Report)		Stadium: Stadion Várkerti; Referee: (Hungary) Dániel Becséri

10 March 2012 19	Kaposvári Rákóczi FC	2–0	Lombard-Pápa TFC	Kaposvár, Somogy County
16:00 CET (UTC+01)	Grumić 6' 73'	(Report)		Stadium: Stadion Kaposvár Rákóczi; Attendance: 2,000; Referee: (Hungary) Ádám Farkas

17 March 2012 20	Lombard-Pápa TFC	1–2	Diósgyőri VTK	Pápa, Veszprém County
17:00 CET (UTC+01)	Lovrencsics 88'	(Report)	Luque 27' (pen.); Tisza 76'	Stadium: Stadion Várkerti; Attendance: 1,200; Referee: (Hungary) József Berger

24 March 2012 21	Debreceni VSC	2–2	Lombard-Pápa TFC	Debrecen, Hajdú-Bihar County
15:00 CET (UTC+01)	Kulcsár 6'; Coulibaly 50'	(Report)	Tóth 56'; Benko 67'	Stadium: Stadion Oláh Gábor Út; Attendance: 5,500; Referee: (Hungary) Dániel Becséri

31 March 2012 22	Lombard-Pápa TFC	0–0	Pécsi Mecsek FC	Pápa, Veszprém County
17:00 CET (UTC+01)		(Report)		Stadium: Stadion Várkerti; Attendance: 1,200; Referee: (Hungary) Viktor Kassai

8 April 2012 23	Budapest Honvéd FC	2–0	Lombard-Pápa TFC	Budapest, Pest County
16:00 CET (UTC+01)	Délczeg 17'; Botis 24'	(Report)		Stadium: Bozsik Stadion; Attendance: 500; Referee: (Hungary) Ádám Radványi

14 April 2012 24	Lombard-Pápa TFC	1–0	Szombathelyi Haladás	Pápa, Veszprém County
18:00 CET (UTC+01)	Seye 88'	(Report)		Stadium: Stadion Várkerti; Attendance: 2,000; Referee: (Hungary) János Takács

21 April 2012 25	Vasas SC	1–1	Lombard-Pápa TFC	Budapest, Pest County
18:00 CET (UTC+01)	Görgényi 18'	(Report)	Farkas 29' (pen.)	Stadium: Stadion Rudolf Illovszky; Attendance: 2,500; Referee: (Hungary) Viktor Kassai

28 April 2012 26	Lombard-Pápa TFC	0–1	Zalaegerszegi TE	Pápa, Veszprém County
18:00 CET (UTC+01)		(Report)	Pavićević 12'	Stadium: Stadion Várkerti; Attendance: 800; Referee: (Hungary) Roland Veizer

5 May 2012 27	Ferencvárosi TC	0–2	Lombard-Pápa TFC	Budapest, Pest County
17:30 CET (UTC+01)		(Report)	Lovrencsics 15' 31'	Stadium: Stadion Albert Flórián; Attendance: 3,417; Referee: (Hungary) József Berger

12 May 2012 28	Lombard-Pápa TFC	1–0	Kecskeméti TE	Pápa, Veszprém County
19:00 CET (UTC+01)	Lovrencsics 72'	(Report)		Stadium: Stadion Várkerti; Attendance: 500; Referee: (Hungary) Zoltán Iványi

20 May 2012 29	Videoton FC	2–0	Lombard-Pápa TFC	Székesfehérvár, Fejér County
18:00 CET (UTC+01)	Nikolić 52' (pen.) 69'	(Report)		Stadium: Sóstói Stadion; Attendance: 3,412; Referee: (Hungary) Ádám Radványi

27 May 2012 30	Lombard-Pápa TFC	0–2	Győri ETO FC	Pápa, Veszprém County
15:30 CET (UTC+01)		(Report)	Varga 60'; Völgyi 85'	Stadium: Stadion Várkerti; Attendance: 800; Referee: (Hungary) Gábor Oláh

=== Classification ===
Pos	Team	Pld	W	D	L	GF	GA	GD	Pts	Qualification or relegation
12	Pécs	30	8	10	12	36	50	−14	34	
13	Újpest	30	8	8	14	34	46	−12	32	
14	Pápa	30	8	6	16	26	40	−14	30	
15	Vasas (Note: Vasas were deducted 2 points due unauthorized play of Haris Mehmedagić.) (R)	30	5	9	16	29	51	−22	22	Relegation to Nemzeti Bajnokság II
16	ZTE (R)	30	1	10	19	25	65	−40	13	Relegation to Nemzeti Bajnokság II

Source: MLSZ (in Hungarian)
Rules for classification: 1st points; 2nd overall wins; 3rd goal difference; 4th goals scored
(R) Relegated

=== Results summary ===
Overall								Home						Away					
Pld	W	D	L	GF	GA	GD	Pts	W	D	L	GF	GA	GD	W	D	L	GF	GA	GD
30	8	6	16	26	40	−14	30	6	2	7	13	14	−1	2	4	9	13	26	−13

Last updated: 27 May 2012.
Source: NB1

=== Results by round ===
Round	1	2	3	4	5	6	7	8	9	10	11	12	13	14	15	16	17	18	19	20	21	22	23	24	25	26	27	28	29	30
Ground	A	H	A	H	A	H	A	H	A	H	A	H	A	H	A	H	A	H	A	H	A	H	A	H	A	H	A	H	A	H
Result	W	W	D	W	L	L	L	W	L	D	D	L	L	L	L	L	L	W	L	L	D	D	L	W	D	L	W	W	L	L
Position	5	2	4	4	5	7	8	6	7	8	8	9	9	10	11	13	15	10	12	14	15	14	14	14	13	14	14	14	14	14

Updated to match(es) played on 27 May 2012. Source: Matches
A = Away; H = Home; W = Win; D = Draw; L = Loss

== Hungarian Cup ==
21 September 2011 3	Győrszemere KSK	0–10	Lombard-Pápa TFC	Győrszemere, Győr-Moson-Sopron County
15:30		(Report)	Marić 12'; Ferenczi 14' 21' 32' 72'; Farkas 23'; Quintero 39' 49'; Puri 61'; Szabó 76'	Stadium: Városi Sporttelep; Attendance: 300; Referee: (Hungary) Csaba Pintér

2 October 2011 4	Bajai LSE	1–1 (a.e.t.) (4–3 p)	Lombard-Pápa TFC	Baja, Bács-Kiskun County
14:00	Čović 43'	(Report)	Marić 8'	Stadium: Városi Sporttelep; Attendance: 400; Referee: (Hungary) Roland Veizer
	Penalties
	Nagy (penalty scored); Balázs (penalty scored); Čović (penalty scored); Micskó (penalty missed); Villám (penalty missed); Domokos (penalty scored)		Ganugrava (penalty missed); Ferenczi (penalty scored); Tóth (penalty missed); Puri (penalty scored); Lovrencsics (penalty scored); Rodenbücher (penalty missed)

== League Cup ==
=== Group stage ===
31 August 2011 1	Lombard-Pápa TFC	0–0	Győri ETO FC	Pápa, Veszprém County
17:00		(Report)		Stadium: Stadion Várkerti; Attendance: 350; Referee: (Hungary) Zoltán J. Kovács

7 September 2011 2	Zalaegerszegi TE	0–8	Lombard-Pápa TFC	Zalaegerszeg, Zala County
17:00		(Report)	Žuļevs 11' 66'; Varga 41'; Lovrencsics 49' 52'; Szabó 56' 86'; Marić 81'	Stadium: ZTE Arena; Attendance: 300; Referee: (Hungary) Csaba Pintér

5 October 2011 3	Szombathelyi Haladás	2–0	Lombard-Pápa TFC	Szombathely, Vas County
18:00	Ugrai 22'; Skriba	(Report)		Stadium: Rohonci Street Stadium; Attendance: 500; Referee: (Hungary) Krisztián Pánczél

12 October 2011 4	Lombard-Pápa TFC	1–0	Szombathelyi Haladás	Pápa, Veszprém County
16:00	Tóth 81'	(Report)		Stadium: Stadion Várkerti; Attendance: 200; Referee: (Hungary) Dániel Becséri

9 November 2011 5	Lombard-Pápa TFC	4–0	Zalaegerszegi TE	Pápa, Veszprém County
16:00	Lovrencsics 33' 41'; Ferenczi 45' 56'	(Report)		Stadium: Stadion Várkerti; Attendance: 100; Referee: (Hungary) Gyöngyi Gaál

15 November 2011 6	Győri ETO FC	1–3	Lombard-Pápa TFC	Győr, Győr-Moson-Sopron County
13:00	Völgyi 58'	(Report)	Ferenczi 17' 30' 35'	Stadium: ETO Park; Attendance: 300; Referee: (Hungary) Ádám Radványi

==== Classification ====
Pos	Team	Pld	W	D	L	GF	GA	GD	Pts	Qualification
1	Lombard-Pápa	6	4	1	1	16	3	+13	13	Advance to knockout phase
2	Győri ETO FC	6	2	3	1	9	8	+1	9	
3	Szombathelyi Haladás	6	2	1	3	7	9	−2	7	
4	Zalaegerszegi TE	6	1	1	4	6	18	−12	4	

Rules for classification: 1) points; 2) goal difference; 3) number of goals scored.

=== Quarter-final ===
22 February 2012 1st leg	Kaposvári Rákóczi FC	0–1	Lombard-Pápa TFC	Kaposvár, Somogy County
13:30		(Report)	Tóth 75'	Stadium: Stadion Kaposvár Rákóczi; Attendance: 200; Referee: (Hungary) Gábor Oláh

7 March 2012 2nd leg	Lombard-Pápa TFC	1–1 (2–1 agg.)	Kaposvári Rákóczi FC	Pápa, Veszprém County
16:00	Benko 50'	(Report)	Haruna 13'	Stadium: Stadion Várkerti; Attendance: 200; Referee: (Hungary) Ádám Radványi

=== Semi-final ===
27 March 2012 1st leg	Lombard-Pápa TFC	0–3	Videoton FC	Pápa, Veszprém County
18:00		(Report)	Perić 56' 69'; Torghelle 90+1'	Stadium: Stadion Várkerti; Attendance: 500; Referee: (Hungary) István Vad

4 April 2012 2nd leg	Videoton FC	1–0 (4–0 agg.)	Lombard-Pápa TFC	Székesfehérvár, Fejér County
15:30	Vaskó 86'	(Report)		Stadium: Sóstói Stadion; Attendance: 500; Referee: (Hungary) Csaba Pintér

== Pre Season (Winter) ==
21 January 2012	Lombard-Pápa TFC	2–1	Soproni VSE	Pápa, Veszprém County
	Tóth; Inutile	(Report)	Smiljanić	Stadium: Stadion Várkerti; Attendance: 80; Referee: (Hungary) Dávid Ákos

28 January 2012	Lombard-Pápa TFC	2–0	Veszprém FC	Pápa, Veszprém County
	Arsić; Marić	(Report)		Stadium: Stadion Várkerti; Attendance: 150; Referee: (Hungary) Márton Szepesi

8 February 2012	Lombard-Pápa TFC	3–1	FC Nitra (Slovakia)	Pápa, Veszprém County
	Németh; Seye; Tóth (pen.)	(Report)	Bakule	Stadium: Stadion Várkerti; Attendance: 50; Referee: (Hungary) Szabolcs Szilasi

10 February 2012	Lombard-Pápa TFC	2–3	FK Slovan Duslo Šaľa (Slovakia)	Pápa, Veszprém County
	Seye; Szabó	(Report)	Košút; Áč; Jakubjak	Stadium: Stadion Várkerti; Attendance: 50; Referee: (Hungary) Dávid Ákos

11 February 2012	Lombard-Pápa TFC	2–3	FK DAC 1904 Dunajská Streda (Slovakia)	Pápa, Veszprém County
	Quintero; Farkas	(Report)		Stadium: Stadion Várkerti; Attendance: 50; Referee: (Hungary) Dávid Ákos

15 February 2012	Lombard-Pápa TFC	1–2	ŠK Slovan Bratislava (Slovakia)	Pápa, Veszprém County
	Rodenbücher	(Report)		Stadium: Stadion Várkerti; Attendance: 50; Referee: (Hungary) Dávid Ákos

17 February 2012	Lombard-Pápa TFC	1–3	Ajka FC	Pápa, Veszprém County
	Gyömbér	(Report)		Stadium: Stadion Várkerti; Attendance: 50

25 February 2012	Lombard-Pápa TFC	3–1	Csornai SE	Pápa, Veszprém County
	Quintero; Newuche; Seye	(Report)		Stadium: Stadion Várkerti
