= 2010–11 Újpest FC season =

Újpest
2010–11 season
- Managing director: István Csehi
- Manager: Géza Mészöly
- Stadium: Szusza Ferenc Stadion (Home stadium); Illovszky Rudolf Stadion (One Ligakupa match)
- Nemzeti Bajnokság I: 6th
- Magyar Kupa: Quarter-finals
- Ligakupa: Group stage
- Top goalscorer: League: Jarmo Ahjupera; Bence Lázár; Péter Rajczi (8 each); All: Tibor Tisza (12)
- Highest home attendance: 10,343 v Ferencváros (11 September 2010, Nemzeti Bajnokság I)
- Lowest home attendance: 50 v Kaposvár (1 December 2010, Ligakupa)
- Average home league attendance: 3,685
- Biggest win: 6–0 v Ferencváros (Home, 11 September 2010, Nemzeti Bajnokság I)
- Biggest defeat: 1–3 v Pápa (Away, 23 October 2010, Nemzeti Bajnokság I)

The 2010–11 season was Újpest Football Club's 106th competitive season, 100th consecutive season in the Nemzeti Bajnokság I and 111th season in existence as a football club. In addition to the domestic league, Újpest participated in that season's editions of the Magyar Kupa and the Ligakupa.

== Squad ==
Squad at end of season

Note: Flags indicate national team as defined under FIFA eligibility rules; some limited exceptions apply. Players may hold more than one non-FIFA nationality.

No.	Pos.	Nation	Player
1	GK	HUN	Szabolcs Balajcza
2	DF	HUN	Vilmos Szalai
3	DF	HUN	Tamás Rubus
4	DF	HUN	Zoltán Takács
5	MF	CRO	Marin Matoš
6	DF	BRA	Jhonnes
7	FW	HUN	Ádám Balajti
8	FW	HUN	Péter Rajczi
9	FW	HUN	Illés Zsolt Sitku
11	MF	HUN	Péter Simek
13	MF	HUN	Zoltán Böőr
14	MF	SRB	Nikola Mitrović
15	DF	HUN	Zoltán Kiss
16	MF	HUN	Bence Lázár
17	MF	HUN	István Bognár
18	DF	HUN	Krisztián Vermes
19	MF	HUN	Balázs Balogh

No.	Pos.	Nation	Player
20	DF	HUN	Balázs Banai
21	MF	HUN	Mátyás Magos
22	MF	HUN	Tamás Egerszegi
23	GK	HUN	Antal Bozsó
24	DF	HUN	Zoltán Pollák
25	DF	HUN	Gábor Dvorschák
26	DF	HUN	Zsolt Szokol
27	MF	HUN	Dániel Kovács
28	MF	HUN	Dávid Rasztovits
29	DF	HUN	Róbert Litauszki
30	FW	HUN	Balázs Zamostny
31	FW	HUN	Dávid Barczi
32	FW	EST	Jarmo Ahjupera
33	MF	HUN	Bertold Popovics
34	MF	HUN	Tamás Tajthy
36	GK	HUN	Tamás Horváth

== Transfers ==
=== Transfers in ===
Transfer window	Pos.	No.	Player	From
Summer	DF	3	(Hungary) Tamás Rubus	Békéscsaba
Summer	MF	5	(Croatia) Marin Matoš	(Austria) Red Bull Salzburg
Summer	MF	13	(Hungary) Zoltán Böőr	Nyíregyháza
Summer	MF	14	(Serbia) Nikola Mitrović	(Serbia) Napredak Kruševac
Summer	MF	17	(Hungary) István Bognár	Vasas
Summer	MF	19	(Hungary) Balázs Balogh	(Italy) Lecce
Summer	GK	23	(Hungary) Antal Bozsó	Békéscsaba
Winter	DF	6	(Brazil) Jhonnes	Free agent (Note: Previous club Liepājas Metalurgs.)
Winter	MF	28	(Hungary) Dávid Rasztovits	(Germany) Singen 04
Winter	FW	30	(Hungary) Balázs Zamostny	Pécs

=== Transfers out ===
Transfer window	Pos.	No.	Player	To
Summer	FW	–	(Republic of the Congo) Francis Litsingi	Kecskemét
Summer	DF	2	(Serbia) Ivan Dudić	Released
Summer	MF	5	(Serbia) Dušan Vasiljević	Videoton
Summer	MF	6	(England) Tony Stokes	Released
Summer	MF	16	(Hungary) Attila Hullám	Released
Summer	MF	17	(Hungary) Norbert Tóth	Pápa
Summer	DF	19	(Hungary) Tamás Vaskó	Videoton
Summer	MF	20	(Central African Republic) Foxi Kéthévoama	Kecskemét
Summer	FW	22	(Hungary) Péter Kabát	Debrecen
Summer	MF	37	(Hungary) Electo Wilson	Kecskemét
Winter	MF	–	(Hungary) Zsolt Bán	Released
Winter	FW	–	(Hungary) Péter Ganczer	Released
Winter	MF	–	(Hungary) László Gyűrű	Released
Winter	MF	–	(Hungary) Imre Hibó	Released
Winter	MF	–	(Hungary) Roland Karacs	Kozármisleny
Winter	DF	–	(Hungary) Márk Kolozsi	Hajdúböszörmény
Winter	MF	–	(Hungary) Dávid Kovács	Released
Winter	MF	–	(Hungary) Imre Kovács	Released
Winter	MF	6	(Hungary) Márk Bogdán	Released
Winter	FW	16	(Hungary) Richárd Frank	MTK
Winter	MF	21	(Hungary) Zsolt Korcsmár	(Norway) Brann
Winter	GK	23	(Hungary) Mátyás Esterházy	Budaörs
Winter	MF	28	(Brazil) Jucemar Gaucho	Released
Winter	FW	28	(Hungary) Kristóf Urbányi	(Portugal) Portimonense

=== Loans in ===
Transfer window	Pos.	No.	Player	From	End date
Summer	FW	9	(Hungary) Illés Zsolt Sitku	Videoton	End of season
Winter	FW	7	(Hungary) Ádám Balajti	Debrecen	End of season
Winter	FW	32	(Estonia) Jarmo Ahjupera	Győr	End of season

=== Loans out ===
Transfer window	Pos.	No.	Player	To	End date
Summer	MF	21	(Hungary) Zsolt Korcsmár	(Norway) Brann	Middle of season
Summer	FW	27	(Hungary) Mohamed Remili	Szolnok	End of season
Winter	MF	–	(Hungary) Roland Domonyi	Cegléd	End of season
Winter	MF	7	(Hungary) Krisztián Simon	(Netherlands) Feyenoord	End of season
Winter	FW	10	(Hungary) Tibor Tisza	(Belgium) Sint-Truiden	End of season

== Competitions ==
=== Overview ===
Competition	First match	Last match	Starting round	Final position	Record							
Competition	First match	Last match	Starting round	Final position	Pld	W	D	L	GF	GA	GD	Win %
Nemzeti Bajnokság I	1 August 2010	22 May 2011	Matchday 1	6th	30	13	6	11	50	38	+12	43.33
Magyar Kupa	27 October 2010	16 March 2011	Round of 32	Quarter-finals	5	3	1	1	15	8	+7	60.00
Ligakupa	24 July 2010	8 December 2010	Group stage	Group stage	4	1	1	2	6	6	+0	25.00
Total					39	17	8	14	71	52	+19	43.59

Source: Competitions

=== Nemzeti Bajnokság I ===
==== League table ====
Pos	Team	Pld	W	D	L	GF	GA	GD	Pts
4	ZTE	30	14	6	10	51	47	+4	48
5	Debrecen	30	12	10	8	53	43	+10	46
6	Újpest	30	13	6	11	50	38	+12	45
7	Kaposvár	30	13	4	13	41	42	−1	43
8	Haladás	30	11	8	11	42	36	+6	41

Source: soccerway.com
Rules for classification: 1st points; 2nd overall wins; 3rd goal difference; 4th goals scored

==== Results summary ====
Overall								Home						Away					
Pld	W	D	L	GF	GA	GD	Pts	W	D	L	GF	GA	GD	W	D	L	GF	GA	GD
30	13	6	11	50	38	+12	45	10	4	1	34	17	+17	3	2	10	16	21	−5

Source: Hungarian Football Federation

==== Results by round ====
Round	1	2	3	4	5	6	7	8	9	10	11	12	13	14	15	16	17	18	19	20	21	22	23	24	25	26	27	28	29	30
Ground	H	A	A	H	A	H	A	H	A	H	A	H	A	H	A	A	H	H	A	H	A	H	A	H	A	H	A	H	A	H
Result	D	W	D	D	L	W	D	W	L	W	L	L	L	W	L	L	W	D	L	W	L	D	L	W	W	W	L	W	W	W
Position	11	6	8	8	9	8	10	7	9	6	9	10	10	9	9	11	9	9	11	10	11	11	13	12	10	8	9	7	7	6
Points	1	4	5	6	6	9	10	13	13	16	16	16	16	19	19	19	22	23	23	26	26	27	27	30	33	36	36	39	42	45

Source: Matches
A = Away; H = Home; W = Win; D = Draw; L = Loss

==== Matches ====
1 August 2010 1	Újpest	0–0	Győr	Budapest
20:00 CEST (UTC+2)	Tajthy (yellow card) 85'	Report	Stanišić (yellow card) 63'; Nicorec (yellow card) 72'; Trajković (yellow card) 80'	Stadium: Szusza Ferenc Stadion; Attendance: 4,750; Referee: Viktor Kassai; Assistant referees: Gábor Erős, Vencel Tóth II; Fourth official: Szabolcs Fenyvesi

6 August 2010 2	Kaposvár	0–1	Újpest	Kaposvár
19:00 CEST (UTC+2)	Kulcsár (yellow card) 25'; Zsók (yellow card) 35'	Report	Egerszegi (yellow card) 11'; Grúz 46' (o.g.); Tisza (red card) 70'; Takács (yellow card) 90+1'; Banai (yellow card) 90+3'	Stadium: Rákóczi Stadion; Attendance: 4,000; Referee: József Berger; Assistant referees: Attila Forgács, Zoltán Kis; Fourth official: Gábor Fajkusz

14 August 2010 3	Siófok	1–1	Újpest	Siófok
20:00 CEST (UTC+2)	Ludánszki (yellow card) 38'; Graszl 52', (yellow card) 90'; Délczeg (yellow card) 76'	Report	Sitku (yellow card) 53'; Kiss (yellow card) 86'; Tajthy 86'	Stadium: Révész Géza utcai Stadion; Attendance: 7,000; Referee: Mihály Fábián; Assistant referees: Dr. Zsolt Varga, Zoltán Pápai; Fourth official: Róbert Nagy

21 August 2010 4	Újpest	2–2	Vasas	Budapest
20:00 CEST (UTC+2)	Rajczi 13'; Egerszegi (yellow card) 17'; Pollák (yellow card) 60'; Tisza 62'	Report	Arnaut 45'; Ferenczi 46'; Bakos (yellow card) 67'	Stadium: Szusza Ferenc Stadion; Attendance: 3,827; Referee: Zoltán Iványi; Assistant referees: Zsolt Szpisják, János Medovarszki; Fourth official: Gábor Fajkusz

27 August 2010 5	MTK	1–0	Újpest	Budapest
19:00 CEST (UTC+2)	Tischler 89', (yellow card) 90'	Report		Stadium: Hidegkuti Nándor Stadion; Attendance: 1,500; Referee: Viktor Kassai; Assistant referees: Tibor Vámos, Gábor Erős; Fourth official: József Erdős

11 September 2010 6	Újpest	6–0	Ferencváros	Budapest
17:30 CEST (UTC+2)	Böőr (yellow card) 18'; Simon 28'; Takács (yellow card) 40'; Tisza 43', 90+3'; Rajczi 56', 72', (yellow card) 56'; Mitrović 61'	Report	Heinz (red card) 40'; Balog (yellow card) 43'	Stadium: Szusza Ferenc Stadion; Attendance: 10,343; Referee: Péter Solymosi; Assistant referees: Zsolt Szpisják, Oszkár Lémon; Fourth official: József Berger

19 September 2010 7	Debrecen	1–1	Újpest	Debrecen
17:30 CEST (UTC+2)	Laczkó (yellow card) 22', (goal) 75'; Komlósi (yellow card) 78'	Report	Mitrović (yellow card) 15'; Simek 73'	Stadium: Oláh Gábor utcai Stadion; Attendance: 5,000; Referee: István Vad; Assistant referees: Róbert Kispál, György Ring; Fourth official: József Erdős

24 September 2010 8	Újpest	1–0	Szolnok	Budapest
19:00 CEST (UTC+2)	B. Balogh 90+2'	Report		Stadium: Szusza Ferenc Stadion; Attendance: 0 Referee: J. Zoltán Kovács; Assistant referees: Vencel Tóth II, Gábor Kormányos II; Fourth official: László Lovas
Note: Újpest was punished with two matches behind closed doors for fan disturbances during the derby against Ferencváros, which was eventually reduced to one match.

2 October 2010 9	Zalaegerszeg	2–1	Újpest	Zalaegerszeg
15:00 CEST (UTC+2)	Pavićević 8'; Máté (yellow card) 37'; Rajcomar 57'; Vlaszák (yellow card) 86'	Report	Rajczi (yellow card) 36', (goal) 87'; Matoš (yellow card) 50'	Stadium: ZTE Arena; Attendance: 4,115; Referee: Mihály Fábián; Assistant referees: Dr. Zsolt Varga, Gyula Ortó; Fourth official: Ádám Radványi

15 October 2010 10	Újpest	3–1	Haladás	Budapest
19:00 CEST (UTC+2)	Mitrović (yellow card) 39'; Szokol (yellow card) 45'; Tisza 51'; Takács (yellow card) 71'; Rajczi 72'; Barczi 75'	Report	Irhás (yellow card) 11'; Lattenstein 81'; Tóth (yellow card) 89'	Stadium: Szusza Ferenc Stadion; Attendance: 3,557; Referee: Roland Veizer; Assistant referees: Péter Berettyán, Tamás Márkus; Fourth official: Ádám Radványi

23 October 2010 11	Pápa	3–1	Újpest	Pápa
17:30 CEST (UTC+2)	Vermes 4' (o.g.); Šupić (yellow card) 43'; Marić 69'; Gyömbér (yellow card) 75'; Heffler 81'	Report	Tisza 72'; Z. Takács (yellow card) 77'; Barczi (yellow card) 84'	Stadium: Perutz Stadion; Attendance: 2,500; Referee: Viktor Kassai; Assistant referees: Tibor Vámos, György Ring; Fourth official: József Erdős

31 October 2010 12	Újpest	2–3	Paks	Budapest
17:30 CEST (UTC+2)	Tisza 44'; Böőr 50'; Mitrović (yellow card) 68'	Report	Éger 16'; Csehi (yellow card) 27'; Böde 32'; Bartha 60'; T. Kiss (yellow card) 70'	Stadium: Szusza Ferenc Stadion; Attendance: 2,849; Referee: Álvaro García Miquel; Assistant referees: Vencel Tóth II, János Medovarszki; Fourth official: Tibor Gyarmati II

5 November 2010 13	Kecskemét	4–3	Újpest	Kecskemét
17:00 CET (UTC+1)	Kéthévoama 9'; Alempijević 48', (yellow card) 49'; Tököli 67'; Gyagya (yellow card) 75'; Čukić 80'; Rybánsky (yellow card) 84'	Report	Vermes (yellow card) 22'; Böőr 39'; Szokol (yellow card) 57'; Rajczi 87'; Barczi 89'	Stadium: Széktói Stadion; Attendance: 3,000; Referee: Péter Solymosi; Assistant referees: Zsolt Szpisják, Gábor Takács; Fourth official: László Lovas

13 November 2010 14	Újpest	3–1	Honvéd	Budapest
17:30 CET (UTC+1)	Pollák (yellow card) 19'; Hajdú 40' (o.g.); Böőr 45'; Rajczi 53'	Report	Danilo Cirino (yellow card) 52'; Bajner 82'	Stadium: Szusza Ferenc Stadion; Attendance: 4,265; Referee: István Vad; Assistant referees: Oszkár Lémon, László Viszokai; Fourth official: Gergely Szőts

21 November 2010 15	Videoton	1–0	Újpest	Székesfehérvár
17:30 CET (UTC+1)	Nikolić 77', (yellow card) 78'	Report	Tisza (yellow card) 41'; Mitrović (yellow card) 75'	Stadium: Sóstói Stadion; Attendance: 5,145; Referee: Zsolt Szabó; Assistant referees: György Ring, István Albert; Fourth official: Szabolcs Fenyvesi

28 November 2010 16	Győr	2–1	Újpest	Győr
17:30 CET (UTC+1)	Bouguerra 42'; Völgyi (yellow card) 55'; Ceolin 87'	Report	Rajczi (yellow card) 57'; Simon 60'; Tajthy (yellow card) 71'; Vermes (yellow card) 90+2'	Stadium: ETO Park; Attendance: 1,000; Referee: Zoltán Iványi; Assistant referees: Zsolt Szpisják, János Medovarszki; Fourth official: László Lovas

26 February 2011 17	Újpest	3–2	Kaposvár	Budapest
17:30 CET (UTC+1)	Ahjupera (yellow card) 32'; Mitrović (yellow card) 39'; Rubus 48'; Lázár 52', 87'; Matoš (red card) 83'	Report	Perić 15'; Zahorecz (yellow card) 23'; Hegedűs 30', (yellow card) 70'; Kulcsár (yellow card) 78'	Stadium: Szusza Ferenc Stadion; Attendance: 4,000; Referee: Zoltán Iványi; Assistant referees: Zsolt Szpisják, István Albert; Fourth official: Ádám Németh

4 March 2011 18	Újpest	1–1	Siófok	Budapest
19:00 CET (UTC+1)	Takács (yellow card) 41'; Lázár (yellow card) 47', (goal) 55'	Report	Novák 70'; Lukács (yellow card) 90+1'	Stadium: Szusza Ferenc Stadion; Attendance: 3,056; Referee: Péter Solymosi; Assistant referees: Attila Kelemen, István Tóth; Fourth official: László Varga

13 March 2011 19	Vasas	1–0	Újpest	Budapest
17:30 CET (UTC+1)	Rezes 8'; Présinger (red card) 34'; Mileusnić (yellow card) 38'	Report	Jhonnes (yellow card) 56'; Tajthy (yellow card) 64'; Rubus (yellow card) 75'	Stadium: Illovszky Rudolf Stadion; Attendance: 6,000; Referee: Tamás Bognár; Assistant referees: Zsolt Szpisják, István Albert; Fourth official: Szabolcs Szilasi

20 March 2011 20	Újpest	2–1	MTK	Budapest
17:30 CET (UTC+1)	Ahjupera 24', (yellow card) 85'; Balajti 58'; Takács (yellow card) 62'; Böőr (yellow card) 65'; Kiss (yellow card) 84'; Simek (yellow card) 90'	Report	Kanta 74'; Könyves (yellow card) 84'	Stadium: Szusza Ferenc Stadion; Attendance: 2,354; Referee: István Vas; Assistant referees: György Ring, Vencel Tóth II; Fourth official: Gergely Szőts

1 April 2011 21	Ferencváros	1–0	Újpest	Budapest
19:00 CEST (UTC+2)	Heinz 40'; Andrezinho (yellow card) 44'; Rodenbücher (yellow card) 47'; Rósa (yellow card) 56'	Report	Rajczi (yellow card) 12'; Balajti (yellow card) 18'; Mitrović (yellow card) 20'; Rubus (yellow card) 59'; Lázár (yellow card) 82'	Stadium: Stadion Albert Flórián; Attendance: 13,000; Referee: Zoltán Iványi; Assistant referees: György Ring, Róbert Kispál; Fourth official: Ádám Németh

10 April 2011 22	Újpest	2–2	Debrecen	Budapest
17:30 CEST (UTC+2)	Ahjupera 45', 82'; Tajthy (yellow card) 71'	Report	Coulibaly 12', (yellow card) 90'; Varga (yellow card) 43'; Mijadinoski (yellow card) 46'; Ramos (yellow card) 52'; Czvitkovics 64'	Stadium: Szusza Ferenc Stadion; Attendance: 3,642; Referee: Sándor Andó-Szabó; Assistant referees: István Albert, János Medovarszki; Fourth official: Tibor Gyarmati II

15 April 2011 23	Szolnok	1–0	Újpest	Szolnok
17:00 CEST (UTC+2)	Fitos 31'; Lengyel (yellow card) 36'; Đurović (yellow card) 45'	Report	Lázár (yellow card) 38'; Tajthy (yellow card) 90'	Stadium: Tiszaligeti Stadion; Attendance: 2,000; Referee: Ádám Radványi; Assistant referees: Dr. Zsolt Varga, Zoltán Pápai; Fourth official: Róbert Nagy

22 April 2011 24	Újpest	4–2	Zalaegerszeg	Budapest
19:00 CEST (UTC+2)	Pollák (yellow card) 23'; Ahjupera 38', 85', (yellow card) 90+2'; Lázár 46'; Balogh 49'; Balajti (yellow card) 52'; Takács (yellow card) 61'	Report	Rajcomar 66'; I. Delić 88'	Stadium: Szusza Ferenc Stadion; Attendance: 3,247; Referee: Zsolt Szabó; Assistant referees: Vencel Tóth II, István Tóth; Fourth official: Tibor Farkas

26 April 2011 25	Haladás	0–2	Újpest	Szombathely
16:30 CEST (UTC+2)	Rózsa (yellow card) 13'; Á. Simon (yellow card) 54'; Halmosi (red card) 63'; Guzmics (yellow card) 73'; Kenesei (yellow card) 83'	Report	Szokol (yellow card) 27'; Lázár 44'; Balogh (yellow card) 58'; Balajti 73'; Pollák (yellow card) 89'	Stadium: Rohonci út Attendance: 3,000; Referee: Mihály Fábián; Assistant referees: Péter Berettyán, Tamás Márkus; Fourth official: Róbert Nagy

30 April 2011 26	Újpest	2–1	Pápa	Budapest
17:30 CEST (UTC+2)	Lázár 24'; Dvorschák (yellow card) 63'; Ahjupera 76'; Rajczi (yellow card) 83'	Report	Gyömbér (yellow card) 39'; Žuļevs (yellow card) 56'; Quintero 74', (red card) 90+2'	Stadium: Szusza Ferenc Stadion; Attendance: 3,024; Referee: Gábor Oláh; Assistant referees: Zsolt Szpisják, János Medovarszki; Fourth official: Gábor Fajkusz

7 May 2011 27	Paks	2–1	Újpest	Paks
19:00 CEST (UTC+2)	Vayer 41'; Böde 85', (yellow card) 87'; Magasföldi (yellow card) 90'	Report	Lázár 64', (yellow card) 68'	Stadium: Fehérvári úti Stadion; Attendance: 3,500; Referee: J. Zoltán Kovács; Assistant referees: László Viszokai, Dániel Szalai; Fourth official: Gábor Péter Kovács

11 May 2011 28	Újpest	2–1	Kecskemét	Budapest
17:30 CEST (UTC+2)	Takács 35', (yellow card) 45'; Ba. Balogh (yellow card) 63'; Tajthy (yellow card) 87'; Lázár 90+4'	Report	Tököli 24'; Mohl (yellow card) 34'; Čukić (yellow card) 40'; Radanović (red card) 72'; Rybánsky (yellow card) 72'; Gyagya (yellow card) 84'	Stadium: Szusza Ferenc Stadion; Attendance: 2,512; Referee: Sebastian Jarzębak (Poland); Assistant referees: Bartlomiej Lekki (Poland), Adam Jakubczyk (Poland); Fourth official: Gábor Péter Kovács (Hungary)

14 May 2011 29	Honvéd	1–4	Újpest	Budapest
15:00 CEST (UTC+2)	A. Horváth (yellow card) 40'; Hajdú (yellow card) 50'; Cirino 57'; Botiș (yellow card) 68'	Report	Ahjupera 9'; Balogh 36'; Tajthy (yellow card) 38'; Balajti 40'; Rajczi 88'	Stadium: Bozsik József Stadion; Attendance: 2,000; Referee: István Vad; Assistant referees: István Tóth, Róbert Horváth; Fourth official: Balázs Böcskei

22 May 2011 30	Újpest	1–0	Videoton	Budapest
17:30 CEST (UTC+2)	Ahjupera 14'; Litauszki (yellow card) 23'; Mitrović (yellow card) 87'	Report	Vaskó (yellow card) 21'	Stadium: Szusza Ferenc Stadion; Attendance: 3,857; Referee: Roland Veizer; Assistant referees: Dr. Zsolt Varga, Péter Berettyán; Fourth official: Balázs Berke

=== Magyar Kupa ===
27 October 2010 Round of 32	Bőcs	1–5	Újpest	Mezőkövesd (Note: The match was played at the Városi Stadion in Mezőkövesd, instead of Bőcs regular stadium, the Szabadság utcai Stadion in Bőcs, due to shortcomings in the organisation of the fixture.)
14:30 CEST (UTC+2)	Lázár (yellow card) 44'; Etogo 55'	Report	Tisza 11', 62'; Matoš 13', 79'; Simek 45'	Stadium: Városi Stadion; Attendance: 500; Referee: János Takács; Assistant referees: Lajos L. Tóth, László Hadházi

==== Round of 16 ====
9 November 2010 First leg	Pápa	1–3	Újpest	Pápa
17:00 CET (UTC+1)	Farkas (yellow card) 8'; Marić (yellow card) 44'; Bárányos 45'; Rebryk (yellow card) 67'; Tóth (yellow card) 81'	Report	Tisza 30', 74'; Vermes (yellow card) 44'; Mitrović 68'	Stadium: Perutz Stadion; Attendance: 800; Referee: Gábor Oláh; Assistant referees: Róbert Kispál, István Tóth

1 March 2011 Second leg	Újpest	3–1 (6–2 agg.)	Pápa	Budapest
18:00 CET (UTC+1)	Sitku 58'; Egerszegi (yellow card) 61'; Mitrović 63'; Lázár 81'	Report	Bali 82'	Stadium: Szusza Ferenc Stadion; Attendance: 1,178; Referee: Roland Veizer; Assistant referees: Péter Berettyán, Róbert Horváth
Note: Újpest won 6–2 on aggregate.

==== Quarter-finals ====
8 March 2011 First leg	Újpest	2–3	Kaposvár	Budapest
18:00 CET (UTC+1)	Lázár 33'; Szokol (yellow card) 45'; Ahjupera 60'	Report	Grumić 20', 38'; Balázs 64'; Sass (yellow card) 72'	Stadium: Szusza Ferenc Stadion; Attendance: 1,526; Referee: Viktor Kassai; Assistant referees: Gábor Erős, György Ring; Fourth official: József Erdős

16 March 2011 Second leg	Kaposvár	2–2 (5–4 agg.)	Újpest	Kaposvár
17:00 CET (UTC+1)	Zsók 20'; Kulcsár 73', (yellow card) 73'; Kovács (yellow card) 79'	Report	Dvorschák (yellow card) 16'; Böőr (yellow card) 31', (goal) 62'; Rajczi (red card) 47'; Kiss (yellow card) 59'; Sitku 86'; Mitrović (red card) 88'	Stadium: Rákóczi Stadion; Attendance: 2,000; Referee: Péter Solymosi; Assistant referees: Oszkár Lémon, Gábor Takács
Note: Kaposvár won 5–4 on aggregate.

=== Ligakupa ===
==== Group stage ====
Pos	Team	Pld	W	D	L	GF	GA	GD	Pts	Qualification	SIÓ	ÚJP	KAP
1	Siófok	4	3	1	0	8	3	+5	10	Advance to knockout phase	—	1–0	1–1
2	Újpest	4	1	1	2	6	6	0	4		2–3	—	3–1
3	Kaposvár	4	0	2	2	3	8	−5	2		0–3	1–1	—

24 July 2010 1	Kaposvár	1–1	Újpest	Kaposvár
20:00 CEST (UTC+2)	Oláh 23'; Lipusz (yellow card) 89'	Report	Tajthy (red card) 45'; Simon 56'	Stadium: Rákóczi Stadion; Attendance: 500; Referee: Péter Solymosi; Assistant referees: Arnold Kepe, Milán Mohos

29 July 2010 2	Újpest	2–3	Siófok	Budapest
18:00 CEST (UTC+2)	Tisza 16', 38'; T. Horváth (yellow card) 50'	Report	Ribeiro 31'; Lukács 49'; Kocsis (yellow card) 59'; Sallér (yellow card) 63'; Délczeg 69'	Stadium: Szusza Ferenc Stadion; Attendance: 700; Referee: Szabolcs Szilasi; Assistant referees: Krisztián Király, Gábor Gyürüsi

1 December 2010 3	Újpest	3–1	Kaposvár	Budapest (Note: The HFF Competition Committee approved the right to play the fixture at the artificial-turf of the Illovszky Rudolf Stadion in Budapest.)
14:00 CET (UTC+1)	Balogh 35'; Litauszki 83'; Lázár 89'	Report	Zahorecz 4'	Stadium: Illovszky Rudolf Stadion; Attendance: 50; Referee: Ádám Németh; Assistant referees: István Tóth, Zsolt Márton

8 December 2010 4	Siófok	1–0	Újpest	Siófok
13:00 CET (UTC+1)	Tóth 72'; Novák (yellow card) 77'	Report	Pollák (yellow card) 24'; Tajthy (yellow card) 60'; Szalai (yellow card) 72'	Stadium: Balatoni Vasas SE Sportpálya; Attendance: 200; Referee: Balázs Berke; Assistant referees: Zsolt Butkai, István Iványi

== Statistics ==
=== Overall ===
Appearances (Apps) numbers are for appearances in competitive games only, including sub appearances.
Source: Competitions

No.	Player	Pos.	Nemzeti Bajnokság I				Magyar Kupa				Ligakupa				Total			
No.	Player	Pos.	Apps	Goal	Yellow card	Red card	Apps	Goal	Yellow card	Red card	Apps	Goal	Yellow card	Red card	Apps	Goal	Yellow card	Red card
1	(Hungary) Szabolcs Balajcza	GK	29				5				1				35			
2	(Hungary) Bence Szabó	FW									1				1			
2	(Hungary) Vilmos Szalai	DF	1								3		1		4		1	
3	(Hungary) Tamás Rubus	DF	10	1	2		1				2				13	1	2	
4	(Hungary) Zoltán Takács	DF	28	1	8		3				1				32	1	8	
5	(Croatia) Marin Matoš	MF	11		1	1	5	2			2				18	2	1	1
6	(Brazil) Jhonnes	DF	1		1										1		1	
7	(Hungary) Ádám Balajti	FW	13	3	2		2								15	3	2	
7	(Hungary) Krisztián Simon	MF	15	2			2				2	1			19	3		
8	(Hungary) Péter Rajczi	FW	22	8	5		2			1	2				26	8	5	1
9	(Hungary) Illés Zsolt Sitku	FW	10		1		2	2			1				13	2	1	
10	(Hungary) Tibor Tisza	FW	15	6	1	1	2	4			2	2			19	12	1	1
11	(Hungary) Péter Simek	MF	18	1	1		4	1							22	2	1	
14	(Serbia) Nikola Mitrović	MF	29	1	7		5	2		1					34	3	7	1
13	(Hungary) Zoltán Böőr	MF	21	3	2		5	1	1		2				28	4	3	
15	(Hungary) Zoltán Kiss	DF	13		2		3		1		1				17		3	
16	(Hungary) Richárd Frank	FW									1				1			
16	(Hungary) Attila Hullám	MF																
16	(Hungary) Bence Lázár	MF	13	8	4		3	2			2	1			18	11	4	
17	(Hungary) István Bognár	MF	1								2				3			
18	(Hungary) Krisztián Vermes	DF	16		2		2		1		2				20		3	
19	(Hungary) Balázs Balogh	MF	17	3	2		2				2	1			21	4	2	
20	(Hungary) Balázs Banai	DF	1		1						2				3		1	
21	(Hungary) Mátyás Magos	MF	4				2				2				8			
22	(Hungary) Tamás Egerszegi	MF	20		2		3		1		3				26		3	
23	(Hungary) Antal Bozsó	GK																
23	(Hungary) Mátyás Esterházy	GK																
24	(Hungary) Zoltán Pollák	DF	26		4		2				2		1		30		5	
25	(Hungary) Gábor Dvorschák	DF	3		1		2		1		2				7		2	
26	(Hungary) Zsolt Szokol	DF	29		3		5		1		2				36		4	
27	(Hungary) Dániel Kovács	MF	3				2				2				7			
28	(Hungary) Dávid Rasztovits	MF																
28	(Hungary) Kristóf Urbányi	FW																
29	(Hungary) Róbert Litauszki	DF	4		1						2	1			6	1	1	
30	(Hungary) Ádám Privigyei	DF									3				3			
31	(Hungary) Dávid Barczi	FW	9	2	1		2								11	2	1	
32	(Estonia) Jarmo Ahjupera	FW	14	8	3		1	1							15	9	3	
33	(Hungary) Bertold Popovics	MF									2				2			
34	(Hungary) Tamás Tajthy	MF	21	1	7		3				2		1	1	26	1	8	1
36	(Hungary) Tamás Horváth	GK	1								3		1		4		1	
Own goals				2												2		
Totals				50	64	2		15	6	2		6	4	1		71	74	5

=== Clean sheets ===
			Clean sheets			
No.	Player	Games Played	Nemzeti Bajnokság I	Magyar Kupa	Ligakupa	Total
1	(Hungary) Szabolcs Balajcza	35	5			5
36	(Hungary) Tamás Horváth	4	1			1
23	(Hungary) Antal Bozsó					
23	(Hungary) Mátyás Esterházy					
Totals			6			6
