= Nikola Mitrović =

Serbian footballer (born 1987)

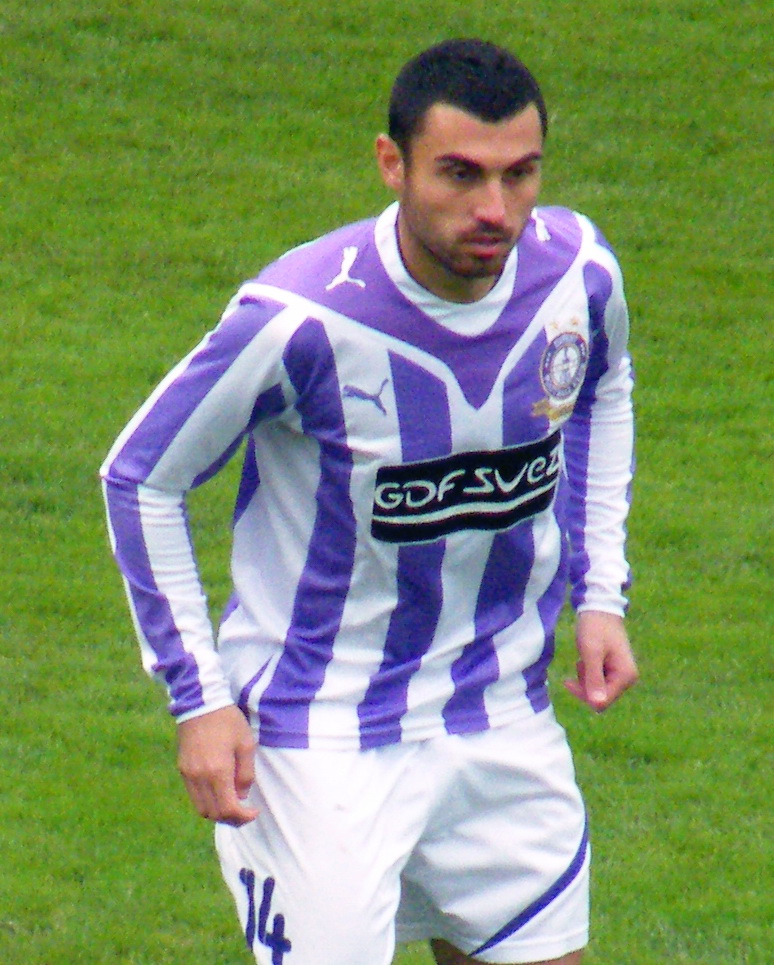
- Mitrović with Újpest in 2010

Personal information
- Full name: Nikola Mitrović
- Date of birth: 2 January 1987 (age 39)
- Place of birth: Kruševac, SR Serbia, SFR Yugoslavia
- Height: 1.80 m (5 ft 11 in)
- Position: Defensive midfielder

Youth career
- 1997–2004: Napredak Kruševac

Senior career*
Years	Team	Apps	(Gls)
2004–2007	Napredak Kruševac	103	(5)
2007–2008	Partizan	15	(0)
2008	→ Napredak Kruševac (loan)	16	(2)
2009	Volga Nizhny Novgorod	20	(2)
2010	Napredak Kruševac	14	(2)
2010–2011	Újpest	29	(1)
2011–2013	Videoton	55	(7)
2013–2016	Maccabi Tel Aviv	81	(4)
2016	Shanghai Shenxin	4	(0)
2016–2017	Bnei Yehuda	16	(0)
2017	Anorthosis	14	(1)
2017	Napredak Kruševac	12	(2)
2018	Wisła Kraków	15	(0)
2018–2019	Keşlə	25	(2)
2019–2020	Zalaegerszeg	31	(3)
2020–2022	Újpest	62	(5)
2022–2023	Budapest Honvéd	29	(0)
2023–2024	BVSC-Zugló	30	(2)
Total		571	(38)

International career
2004	Serbia and Montenegro U17	3	(0)
2010	Serbia	1	(0)
- * Club domestic league appearances and goals

Nikola Mitrović (Serbian Cyrillic: Никола Митровић; born 2 January 1987) is a Serbian former professional footballer who played as a defensive midfielder.

During his 20-year-long journeyman career, Mitrović played 15 seasons abroad across seven countries, most notably in Hungary and Israel.

== Club career ==
=== Early years ===
In 1997, Mitrović joined the youth system of his hometown club Napredak Kruševac. He was promoted to the senior squad in 2004. Over the next three seasons, Mitrović amassed over 100 competitive appearances for the side. The club was administratively promoted to the top flight in July 2007.

=== Partizan ===
On 23 July 2007, Mitrović agreed to a three-year contract with Partizan. He served mainly as a backup to Brazilian defensive midfielder Juca throughout the season, making 18 appearances (league and cup), as the club won the double. Due to strong competition in his position, Mitrović was loaned to his parent club Napredak Kruševac in the 2008 summer transfer window. He was transferred to Russian club Volga Nizhny Novgorod six months later, spending the entire year there, before again returning to Napredak Kruševac in early 2010.

=== Újpest and Videoton ===
In the summer of 2010, Mitrović moved abroad for the second time and joined Hungarian club Újpest. He missed just one out of 30 league games, managing to score once in a 6–0 victory over Újpest's fierce rivals Ferencváros. On 28 June 2011, Mitrović joined Hungarian champions Videoton, signing a two-year contract. He was a regular in his debut season at the club, helping them win the League Cup. In the 2012–13 campaign, Mitrović collected 50 appearances and netted nine goals across all competitions, both career-highs.

=== Maccabi Tel Aviv ===
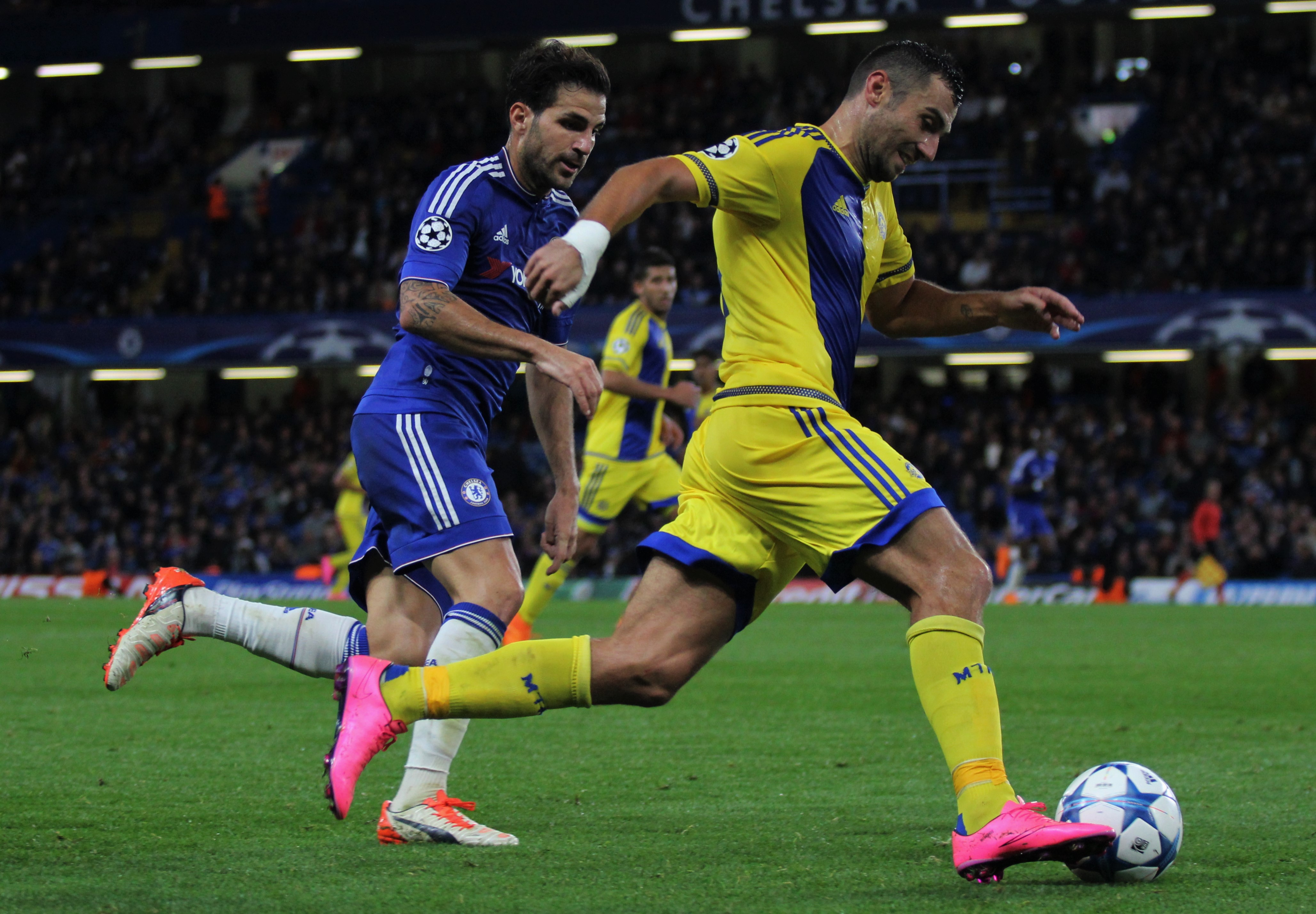
Mitrović in action against Chelsea midfielder Cesc Fàbregas on his UEFA Champions League debut in September 2015

On 4 August 2013, Mitrović moved to Israeli champions Maccabi Tel Aviv on a one-year deal with an extension option. He was signed by his former Videoton manager Paulo Sousa who joined the club earlier that summer. After defending the league title with Maccabi in his debut season, Mitrović helped the side win the domestic treble in the 2014–15 campaign. He subsequently made his UEFA Champions League debut in 2015–16, collecting four appearances in the group stage under his countryman Slaviša Jokanović. On 10 January 2016, it was announced that Mitrović would be leaving the club upon his request.

=== Later years ===
Just a few days following his departure from Maccabi, Mitrović joined China League One club Shanghai Shenxin. He stayed in Asia for only six months, before returning to Israel and signing for Bnei Yehuda in late August 2016. In January of the following year, Mitrović moved to Cypriot club Anorthosis.

In September 2017, Mitrović returned to his homeland and joined his parent club Napredak Kruševac on a free transfer. He scored the winning goal in a 1–0 home league win over Red Star Belgrade on 1 October 2017, chipping the ball from outside the box over Milan Borjan in the sixth minute of injury time.

In January 2018, Mitrović moved to Poland and agreed terms with Ekstraklasa club Wisła Kraków until the end of the season.

In August 2018, Mitrović signed a one-year contract with Azerbaijani club Keşlə.

In July 2019, Mitrović returned to Hungary and penned a one-year deal with Zalaegerszeg.

== International career ==
In April 2010, Mitrović made his full international debut for Serbia, coming on as a substitute for Ljubomir Fejsa in a friendly against Japan, an eventual 3–0 success.

== Career statistics ==
=== Club ===
Appearances and goals by club, season and competition
Club	Season	League			National cup (Note: Includes Serbian Cup, Russian Cup, Magyar Kupa, Israel State Cup, Cypriot Cup, Polish Cup, Azerbaijan Cup)		League cup (Note: Includes Ligakupa, Toto Cup)		Continental		Other		Total	
Club	Season	Division	Apps	Goals	Apps	Goals	Apps	Goals	Apps	Goals	Apps	Goals	Apps	Goals
Napredak Kruševac	2004–05	Second League of Serbia and Montenegro	31	1	0	0	—		—		—		31	1
Napredak Kruševac	2005–06	Serbian First League	37	3	—		—		—		—		37	3
Napredak Kruševac	2006–07	Serbian First League	35	1	2	0	—		—		6 (Note: Appearances in Promotion/relegation play-offs)	0	43	1
Napredak Kruševac	Total		103	5	2	0	—		—		6	0	111	5
Partizan	2007–08	Serbian SuperLiga	15	0	3	0	—		0	0	—		18	0
Napredak Kruševac (loan)	2008–09	Serbian SuperLiga	16	2	2	0	—		—		—		18	2
Volga Nizhny Novgorod	2009	Russian First Division	20	2	1	0	—		—		—		21	2
Napredak Kruševac	2009–10	Serbian SuperLiga	14	2	0	0	—		—		—		14	2
Újpest	2010–11	Nemzeti Bajnokság I	29	1	5	2	0	0	—		—		34	3
Videoton	2011–12	Nemzeti Bajnokság I	28	1	6	0	9	1	2	0	1 (Note: Appearances in Szuperkupa)	0	46	2
Videoton	2012–13	Nemzeti Bajnokság I	27	6	5	0	6	3	11	0	1	0	50	9
Videoton	Total		55	7	11	0	15	4	13	0	2	0	96	11
Maccabi Tel Aviv	2013–14	Israeli Premier League	33	2	0	0	0	0	8	0	—		41	2
Maccabi Tel Aviv	2014–15	Israeli Premier League	34	2	2	1	5	1	0	0	—		41	4
Maccabi Tel Aviv	2015–16	Israeli Premier League	14	0	0	0	2	0	9	0	1 (Note: Appearances in Israel Super Cup)	0	26	0
Maccabi Tel Aviv	Total		81	4	2	1	7	1	17	0	1	0	108	6
Shanghai Shenxin	2016	China League One	4	0	0	0	—		—		—		4	0
Bnei Yehuda	2016–17	Israeli Premier League	16	0	1	0	1	0	—		—		18	0
Anorthosis	2016–17	Cypriot First Division	14	1	4	0	—		—		—		18	1
Napredak Kruševac	2017–18	Serbian SuperLiga	12	2	1	0	—		—		—		13	2
Wisła Kraków	2017–18	Ekstraklasa	15	0	0	0	—		—		—		15	0
Keşlə	2018–19	Azerbaijan Premier League	25	2	2	0	—		0	0	—		27	2
Zalaegerszeg	2019–20	Nemzeti Bajnokság I	31	3	1	0	—		—		—		32	3
Újpest	2020–21	Nemzeti Bajnokság I	30	4	5	0	—		—		—		35	4
Újpest	2021–22	Nemzeti Bajnokság I	32	1	4	0	—		4	0	—		40	1
Újpest	Total		62	5	9	0	—		4	0	—		75	5
Budapest Honvéd	2022–23	Nemzeti Bajnokság I	29	0	3	1	—		—		—		32	1
BVSC-Zugló	2023–24	Nemzeti Bajnokság II	30	2	1	0	—		—		—		31	2
Career total			571	38	48	4	23	5	34	0	9	0	685	47

=== International ===
Appearances and goals by national team and year
National team	Year	Apps	Goals
Serbia	2010	1	0
Total		1	0

== Honours ==
Partizan

- Serbian SuperLiga: 2007–08
- Serbian Cup: 2007–08

Videoton

- Ligakupa: 2011–12
- Szuperkupa: 2011, 2012

Maccabi Tel Aviv

- Israeli Premier League: 2013–14, 2014–15
- Israel State Cup: 2014–15
- Toto Cup: 2014–15

Újpest

- Magyar Kupa: 2020–21
