= Daniel Orozco (footballer) =

Spanish footballer

Personal information
- Full name: Daniel Orozco Álvarez
- Date of birth: 1 February 1987 (age 39)
- Place of birth: Fuengirola, Spain
- Height: 1.84 m (6 ft 0 in)
- Position: Centre back

Youth career
- 2005–2006: Fuengirola

Senior career*
Years	Team	Apps	(Gls)
2006–2007	Fuengirola	30	(0)
2007–2010	Málaga B	49	(1)
2009	→ Estepona (loan)	2	(0)
2010	Málaga	4	(0)
2010–2013	Asteras Tripolis	19	(2)
2013	Lombard-Pápa	6	(0)
Total		110	(3)
- * Club domestic league appearances and goals

Daniel Orozco Álvarez (born 1 February 1987) is a Spanish retired footballer who played as a central defender.

== Football career ==
Orozco was born in Fuengirola, Province of Málaga. After starting out with local UD Fuengirola Los Boliches he joined neighbouring Málaga CF in 2007, representing the reserve team in the fourth division for two seasons.

In July 2009, Orozco signed for another side in Andalusia, Unión Estepona CF in the third level, but returned to his previous club in the following transfer window. On 24 March 2010 he made his first-team – and La Liga – debut, playing the full 90 minutes in a 0–1 away loss against Valencia CF and, even though the team was threatened with relegation until the last day of the season, he was still able to appear in a further three (complete) league matches.

Orozco moved to Asteras Tripolis F.C. from Greece in the summer of 2010, partnering compatriot Rubén Pulido in central defence. He scored his first goal for his new club on 20 November 2010, in a 1–1 draw against Olympiacos Volos.
