= Tino Lagator =

Croatian footballer (born 1987)

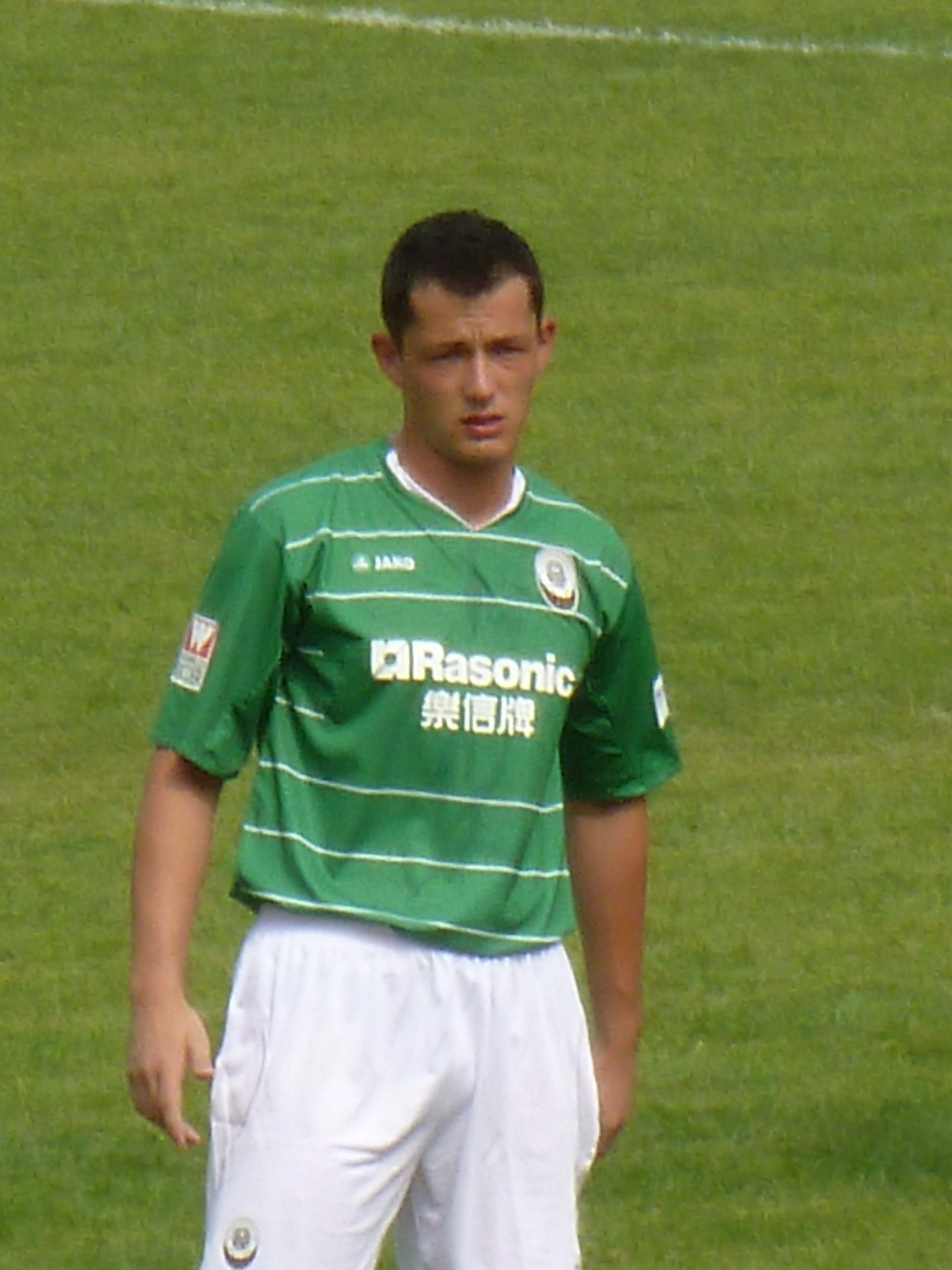

Personal information
- Date of birth: 14 September 1987 (age 39)
- Place of birth: Sinj, Croatia
- Height: 1.75 m (5 ft 9 in)
- Position: Forward

Team information
- Current team: SV Hummetroth
- Number: 23

Youth career
- –2004: OSK Otok

Senior career*
Years	Team	Apps	(Gls)
2004–2005	OSK Otok	23	(16)
2005–2008	Hrvace		
2008–2009	Dugopolje	31	(11)
2009–2010	Junak Sinj	30	(5)
2011	Hrvace	16	(5)
2011	Junak Sinj	13	(8)
2012	TuS Koblenz	0	(0)
2012	Atlantas Klaipėda	13	(11)
2013	Lombard-Pápa	10	(0)
2013	Solin	16	(5)
2014	Happy Valley	1	(0)
2014	Citizen AA	2	(0)
2014–2015	Dugopolje	27	(5)
2015–2022	Hessen Dreieich	157	(60)
2022-	SV Hummetroth	11	(14)
- * Club domestic league appearances and goals as of 1 October 2022

Tino Lagator (Chinese: 拉加度, born 14 September 1987) is a Croatian football player who currently plays for SV Hummetroth in Germany. He previously played for NK Dugopolje in the Druga HNL.
