= Marek Košút =

Slovak footballer (1988–2025)

Personal information
- Date of birth: 26 September 1988
- Place of birth: Považská Bystrica, Czechoslovakia
- Date of death: June 2025 (aged 36)
- Height: 1.92 m (6 ft 4 in)
- Position: Forward

Youth career
- Nitra

Senior career*
Years	Team	Apps	(Gls)
?–2010	Nitra	23	(2)
2011	→ Nové Zámky (loan)		
2011–2012	Šaľa		
2012–2013	Nové Zámky		
2014	Šaľa		
2014–2025	FC Slovan Galanta		
- * Club domestic league appearances and goals

Marek Košút (26 September 1988 – June 2025) was a Slovak football forward who until his death played for 4. liga club FC Slovan Galanta. Košút's death at the age of 36, due to a fall from a balcony, was announced on 9 June 2025.
