= Aleksandrs Čekulajevs =

Latvian footballer (born 1985)

Personal information
- Full name: Aleksandrs Čekulajevs
- Date of birth: 10 September 1985 (age 41)
- Place of birth: Riga, Latvian SSR, USSR (now Republic of Latvia)
- Height: 1.80 m (5 ft 11 in)
- Position: Forward

Youth career
- 1996–2003: FK Auda
- 2003–2004: FK Viola
- 2004–2005: JFK Olimps
- 2005–2006: FK Auda

Senior career*
Years	Team	Apps	(Gls)
2006–2008	FK Rīga	6	(1)
2007–2008	→ FK Auda (loan)	30	(49)
2008	FK Jūrmala-VV	21	(3)
2008–2009	FK Náchod-Deštné	18	(11)
2009–2010	FK Jūrmala-VV	6	(0)
2010–2011	Víkingur Ólafsvík	17	(10)
2011–2012	JK Narva Trans	35	(46)
2012	Valletta	6	(4)
2012	Lombard-Pápa TFC	4	(0)
2013	TTM Lopburi	8	(4)
2013–2014	Żejtun Corinthians	18	(10)
2014	AB Argir	5	(1)
2017–2021	FK Jūrnieks		

International career
	Latvia U-21	4	(1)
- * Club domestic league appearances and goals

Aleksandrs Čekulajevs (born 10 September 1985) is a Latvian footballer who plays as a forward. Čekulajevs is widely famous for his goal scoring abilities. Scoring 46 goals in the 2011 Meistriliiga season he was named in third position as world's top scorer of the year by IFFHS.

== Club career ==
=== Early career ===
Born in Riga, Čekulajevs started playing football in 1996. He spent his youth years training with FK Auda, FK Viola, JFK Olimps and FK Auda yet again. In 2006 the youngster was spotted by the Latvian Higher League club FK Rīga and Čekulajevs signed his first professional contract. He played 6 matches there, scoring 1 goal but soon the club hit financial difficulties and Čekulajevs' contract that should have kept him at the club until 2008 was unofficially broken. FK Jūrmala-VV were keen on signing him, but, even though the contract with FK Rīga didn't exist anymore, the club wanted to receive a transfer fee. Furthermore, FK Rīga was in debts with its players and hadn't paid Čekulajevs his wage for more than 3 months. FK Rīga went bankrupt in 2008.

=== FK Auda ===
In 2007 Čekulajevs joined his former youth years' club FK Auda on loan from FK Rīga, playing in the Latvian First League. Soon he became a first eleven player and wowed everyone with his scoring abilities, netting 51 goal in 30 league matches. He was not only named the top scorer of the season, but also beat the league's scoring record of all time set by Igors Kirilovs in 2002 with 47 goals in one season. He was also named the best player of the Latvian First League in 2007.

=== First clubs abroad ===
After such a great performance Čekulajevs joined FK Jūrmala-VV in 2008. Playing 21 match there, he scored 3 goals and couldn't settle at the club. Soon he left the team, going abroad for the first time in his career and joining FK Náchod-Deštné in the Czech Fourth Division. During one season there he scored 11 goals in 18 matches and came back to FK Jūrmala-VV in 2009. He started the 2009 Latvian Higher League season with them, but after 6 matches without scoring any goals, left for Víkingur Ólafsvík, playing in the Icelandic 2. deild karla. Čekulajevs scored 10 goals in 17 matches for the club, helping his team win the championship.

=== JK Narva Trans ===
After a successful season in Iceland Čekulajevs was signed by the Estonian Meistriliiga club JK Narva Trans. Soon after joining he found himself as a first eleven player, capable of scoring in almost every match he played. By the end of the season, he had scored 46 goals in 35 appearances, not only being the top scorer of his team and the league, but also setting a new goalscoring record for the division. In June 2012 he was named the third top scorer in Europe by the UEFA league point system, thanks to his 46 goals, coming after Cristiano Ronaldo (46) and Lionel Messi (50). After his great performance, various European clubs showed their interest in signing Čekulajevs. During the winter transfer period he went on trials with the Turkish Süper Lig club Trabzonspor, 2. Fußball-Bundesliga club MSV Duisburg and the Polish Ekstraklasa team Lechia Gdańsk. Although scoring record 46 goals, Estonian football pundits and coaches thought that his achievement would have been much more remarkable if the league had not been represented by the worst team - FC Ajax Lasnamäe, who conceded in total of 192 goals in 36 matches (which was only 6 goals short of worst result in European top tiers). Čekulajevs scored 18 of his goals against bottom-finished Ajax.

=== Valletta F.C. ===
Čekulajevs didn't join any of the previously mentioned teams, signing a contract with the Maltese Premier League champions Valletta F.C. on 8 February 2012. He scored a goal on his debut for the club. All in all Čekulajevs scored 4 goals in 6 matches for the club, later being put on the bench for unexplained reasons. In May 2012 Čekulajevs broke his contract with the club, stating that he wasn't happy with the work of his agent.

=== Lombard-Pápa TFC ===
On 3 July 2012, Čekulajevs moved to the Hungarian Nemzeti Bajnokság I, as a free agent signing a contract with Lombard-Pápa TFC. On 1 January 2013, he was released from Lombard-Pápa TFC, having played only four league matches for the club.

=== TTM Lopburi and Żejtun Corinthians ===
On 8 March 2013, it was announced that Čekulajevs had moved to Thai Division 1 side TTM Lopburi on a free transfer, signing a one-year contract. On 1 July 2013, after the end of the contract, he moved to the Maltese First Division side Żejtun Corinthians on a free transfer, signing a contract till the end of the season.

=== AB Argir ===
On 1 July 2014, he moved to the Faroe Islands Premier League club AB Argir.

== Honours ==
Víkingur Ólafsvík

- 2. deild karla: 2010

Individual

- Latvian First League Top Score: 2007
- Meistriliiga Top Score: 2011,
- IFFHS World's Top Scorer of the Year: 2011
