= Vornholz =

- Former municipality
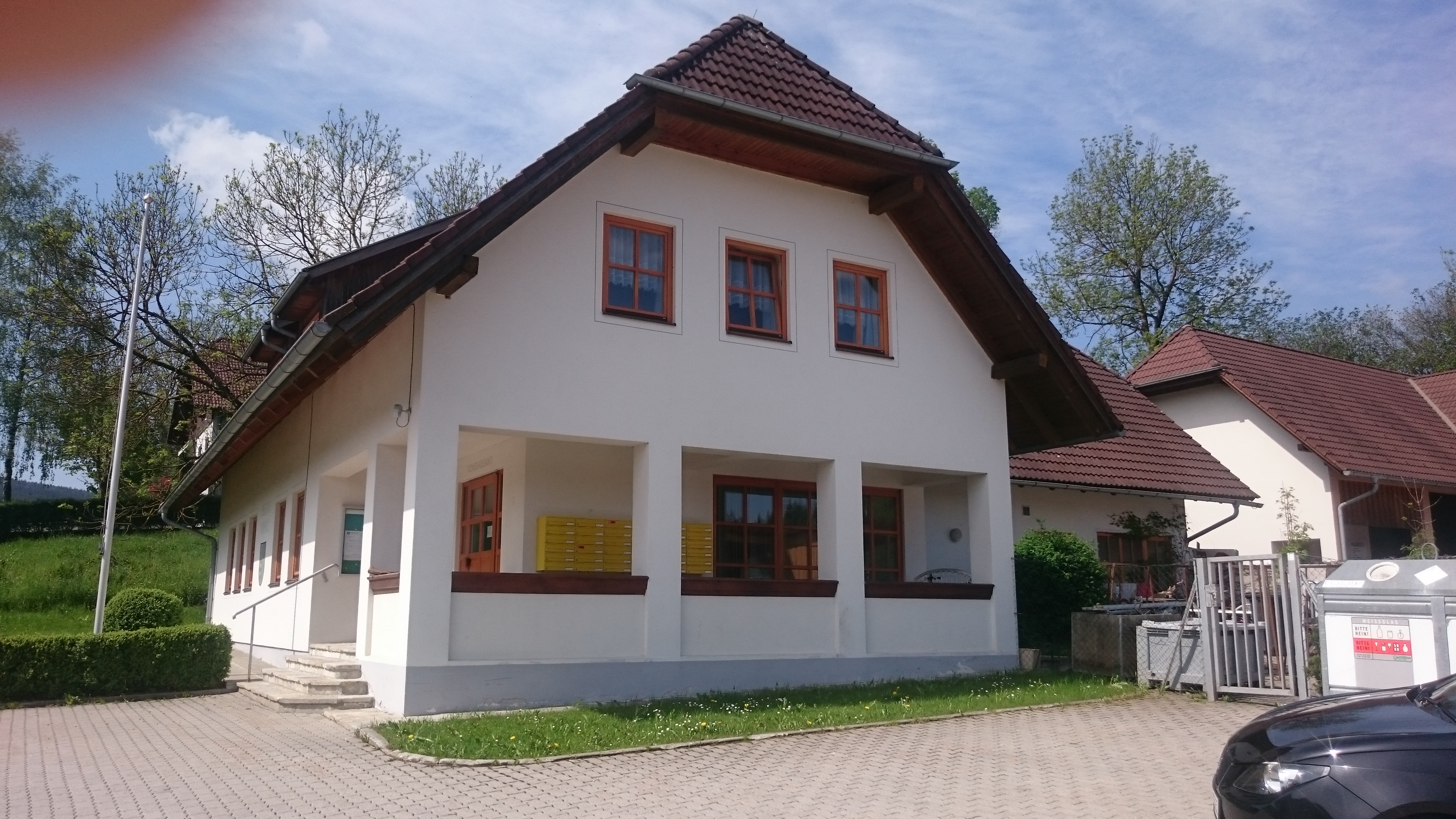
- Former town hall

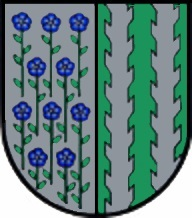
- Coat of arms

- Location within Austria
- Coordinates: 47°23′00″N 15°49′00″E
- Country: Austria
- State: Styria
- District: Hartberg-Fürstenfeld

Area
  - Total: 18.78 km^{2} (7.25 sq mi)
- Elevation: 800 m (2,600 ft)

Population (1 January 2016)
  - Total: 722
  - Density: 38.4/km^{2} (99.6/sq mi)
- Time zone: UTC+1 (CET)
  - Summer (DST): UTC+2 (CEST)
- Postal code: 8250
- Area code: 03336
- Vehicle registration: HB
- Website: www.vornholz. steiermark.at

Vornholz is a former municipality in the district of Hartberg-Fürstenfeld in Styria, Austria. Since the 2015 Styria municipal structural reform, it is part of the municipality Vorau.
