= Krisztián Dóczi =

Hungarian footballer

Personal information
- Full name: Krisztián Dóczi
- Date of birth: 19 November 1989 (age 36)
- Place of birth: Zalaegerszeg, Hungary
- Height: 1.84 m (6 ft 1/2 in)
- Position: Midfielder

Team information
- Current team: Ajka
- Number: 12

Youth career
- 2003–2008: Zalaegerszeg

Senior career*
Years	Team	Apps	(Gls)
2008–2010	Zalaegerszeg II	33	(2)
2010–2011	Kaposvölgye	11	(0)
2011–2014	Pápa	13	(0)
2012	→ BKV Előre (loan)	11	(2)
2014–	Ajka	7	(0)
- * Club domestic league appearances and goals as of 1 June 2014

Krisztián Dóczi (born 19 November 1989 in Zalaegerszeg) is a Hungarian football player who currently plays for FC Ajka.
