= Antonio Inutile =

Finnish footballer (born 1985)

Personal information
- Date of birth: May 12, 1985 (age 41)
- Place of birth: Järvenpää, Finland
- Height: 1.78 m (5 ft 10 in)
- Positions: Midfielder; forward

Senior career*
Years	Team	Apps	(Gls)
2006–2007	HJK	2	(0)
2007	→ Klubi-04	19	(17)
2007–2008	FC KTP	18	(4)
2008–2012	VPS	92	(19)
2011–2012	Lombard-Pápa TFC	9	(0)
2012–2013	PK-35	20	(4)
2014	HIFK	21	(8)
2015–2016	Honka	27	(9)
2017	KäPa	20	(5)
- * Club domestic league appearances and goals

Antonio Inutile (born 12 May 1985) is a Finnish retired footballer.
