= Zoltán Szabó (footballer, born 1980) =

Hungarian footballer (born 1980)

Personal information
- Date of birth: 23 December 1980 (age 45)
- Place of birth: Budapest, Hungary
- Height: 1.76 m (5 ft 9 1/2 in)
- Position: Midfielder

Youth career
- 1995–1998: Újpest FC

Senior career*
| Years | Team | Apps | (Gls) |
| 1999–2001 | Újpest FC | 3 | (0) |
| 2001–2002 | Monori SE | | |
| 2002–2004 | Dunakanyar-Vác FC | 27 | (1) |
| 2004–2005 | Budafoki LC | | |
| 2005 | FC Dabas | | |
| 2005–2006 | Budafoki LC | 12 | (1) |
| 2006–2008 | Lombard Pápa TFC | 60 | (7) |
| 2008–2009 | Ceglédi VSE | 30 | (8) |
| 2009–2011 | SC Herzogenburg | | |
| 2011–2012 | Lombard Pápa TFC | 7 | (0) |
| 2012–2014 | SC Herzogenburg | | |
| 2014–2015 | SC Sitzenberg/Reidling | | |
| 2015–2016 | Csorna | 11 | (0) |
| 2016 | Pápa | | |
- * Club domestic league appearances and goals

Zoltán Szabó (born 23 December 1980) is a Hungarian former football player.
