= Tamás Tajthy =

Hungarian footballer

Personal information
- Date of birth: 29 August 1991 (age 35)
- Place of birth: Miskolc, Hungary
- Height: 1.77 m (5 ft 9 1/2 in)
- Position: Midfielder

Team information
- Current team: Ajka
- Number: 22

Youth career
- 2003–2008: Diósgyőr
- 2008–2010: Újpest

Senior career*
Years	Team	Apps	(Gls)
2010–2013	Újpest	34	(1)
2013–2014	Pápa	25	(0)
2014–2016	Mezőkövesd	38	(1)
2016–2019	Győri ETO	40	(2)
2019–2021	Siófok	55	(0)
2021–	Ajka	78	(2)

International career
2011	Hungary U-21	4	(0)
- * Club domestic league appearances and goals as of 12 August 2024

Tamás Tajthy (born 29 August 1991) is a Hungarian football midfielder who plays for Ajka.

== Career ==
He made his debut on 1 August 2010, in the opening day of the 2010/11 Hungarian National Championship against Győr, coming off the bench in the 60th minute. In the next round he played the whole 90 minutes against Kaposvári Rákóczi. He scored his first goal in the third round in style. He came as a substitute in the 78th minute, his team being a goal down. Seven minutes later, after a corner was headed out, he took the rebound and bombed straight into the left top corner, saving a point for his team.

== Career statistics ==
Appearances and goals by club, season and competition
Club	Season	League			Cup		League Cup		Europe		Total	
Club	Season	Division	Apps	Goals	Apps	Goals	Apps	Goals	Apps	Goals	Apps	Goals
Újpest
Újpest	2009–10	Nemzeti Bajnokság I	0	0	0	0	1	0	0	0	1	0
Újpest	2010–11	Nemzeti Bajnokság I	21	1	3	0	2	0	0	0	26	1
Újpest	2011–12	Nemzeti Bajnokság I	13	0	4	0	1	0	0	0	18	0
Újpest	Total		34	1	7	0	4	0	0	0	45	1
Pápa
Pápa	2012–13	Nemzeti Bajnokság I	11	0	0	0	2	0	0	0	13	0
Pápa	2013–14	Nemzeti Bajnokság I	14	0	3	0	5	0	0	0	22	0
Pápa	Total		25	0	3	0	7	0	0	0	35	0
Career total			59	1	10	0	11	0	0	0	80	1

Updated to games played as of 1 June 2014.
