= Mouhamadou Seye =

Senegalese footballer (born 1988)

Personal information
- Full name: Mouhamadou Moustapha Seye
- Date of birth: 10 October 1988 (age 38)
- Place of birth: Dakar, Senegal
- Height: 1.78 m (5 ft 10 in)
- Position: Striker

Team information
- Current team: Lombard-Pápa TFC

Youth career
- 2006–2007: Bradlan Brezová pod Bradlom

Senior career*
Years	Team	Apps	(Gls)
2007–2009	Dubnica nad Váhom	60	(22)
2009–2011	Dukla Banská Bystrica	42	(5)
2011–2012	Panetolikos	2	(0)
2012	Lombard-Pápa	25	(5)
2013	Zalaegerszeg	13	(5)
2013–2014	Al Markhiya		
2014	Dukla Banská Bystrica	6	(0)
2015	Lombard-Pápa	11	(4)
- * Club domestic league appearances and goals as of 14 June 2015

Mouhamadou Seye (born 10 October 1988) is a Senegalese football who currently plays for Lombard-Pápa TFC. He previously played for Al-Markhiya, Lombard-Pápa TFC and Panetolikos F.C.

== Club career ==
Seye arrived in Slovakia aged sixteen. His arrival was dramatic as he was abandoned by his football agent. Upon expiration of his residence permit, Seye decided to leave Slovakia but was captured on the Slovak-Austrian border and he was placed to a refugee camp in Brezová pod Bradlom. Seye began to play that he began playing for local club Bradlan. Seye moved to Dubnica in July 2007, signing his first professional contract. In September 2008, he obtained Slovak citizenship and became eligible to represent Slovakia in 2011.

On 2 August 2011 he signed a 3-year contract with Greek club Panetolikos However, his contract was terminated on January 13, 2012, after only 2 league appearances.
