= César Quintero (footballer) =

Colombian footballer

Personal information
- Full name: César Alexander Quintero Jiménez
- Date of birth: November 9, 1988 (age 37)
- Place of birth: Medellín, Colombia
- Height: 1.74 m (5 ft 9 in)
- Position: Midfielder

Youth career
- 2002–2007: Independiente Medellín

Senior career*
Years	Team	Apps	(Gls)
2007–2010	Independiente Medellín	3+	(2)
2010–2013	Pápa	101	(6)
2014	Atlético Nacional	7	(0)
2014	Atlético Huila	8	(0)
2015–2016	Once Caldas	54	(2)
2017	Deportes Tolima	10	(1)
2018–2019	Atlético Bucaramanga	10	(1)
2020–2022	Deportivo Pasto	67	(2)
- * Club domestic league appearances and goals as of 17 August 2023

César Alexander Quintero Jiménez (born November 29, 1988, in Medellín) is a Colombian football player. He has appeared as a midfielder across multiple professional teams since 2007.

== Clubs ==
Club	Country	Years
Independiente Medellín	Colombia	2007 - 2009
Lombard-Pápa	Hungary	2009 - 2013
Colombia	2014	
Atlético Huila	Colombia	2014
Once Caldas	Colombia	2015 - 2016
Deportes Tolima	Colombia	2017 - 2018
Atlético Bucaramanga	Colombia	2018 - 2019
Deportivo Pasto	Colombia	2020 - 2022

== Club statistics (senior career) ==
Club	Season	League		National Cup		International		Total	
Club	Season	Apps	Goals	Apps	Goals	Apps	Goals	Apps	Goals
Pápa									
Pápa	2009–10	9	0	0	0	-	-	9	0
Pápa	2010–11	27	1	6	1	-	-	33	2
Pápa	2011–12	20	0	10	2	-	-	30	2
Pápa	2012–13	29	3	5	0	-	-	34	3
Pápa	2013–14	16	2	6	1	-	-	22	3
Pápa	Total club	101	6	27	4	0	0	128	10
Atlético Nacional
Atlético Nacional	2014	7	0	-	-	0	0	7	0
Atlético Nacional	Total club	7	0	0	0	0	0	7	0
Atlético Huila
Atlético Huila	2014	8	0	-	-	-	-	8	0
Atlético Huila	Total club	8	0	0	0	0	0	8	0
Once Caldas
Once Caldas	2015	38	1	6	1	2	0	46	2
Once Caldas	2016	16	1	0	0	-	-	16	1
Once Caldas	Total club	54	2	6	1	2	0	62	3
Deportes Tolima
Deportes Tolima	2017	10	1	2	0	1	0	13	1
Deportes Tolima	Total club	10	1	2	0	1	0	13	1
Atlético Bucaramanga
Atlético Bucaramanga	2018	14	0	1	0	-	-	15	0
Atlético Bucaramanga	2019	18	1	2	0	-	-	20	1
Atlético Bucaramanga	Total club	32	1	3	0	0	0	35	1
Career Total		212	10	38	5	3	0	253	15

Other league stat sources:

== National tournaments ==
Title	Club	Country	Year
Torneo Apertura	Atlético Nacional	Colombia	2014
