= Gábor Tóth (footballer) =

Hungarian footballer

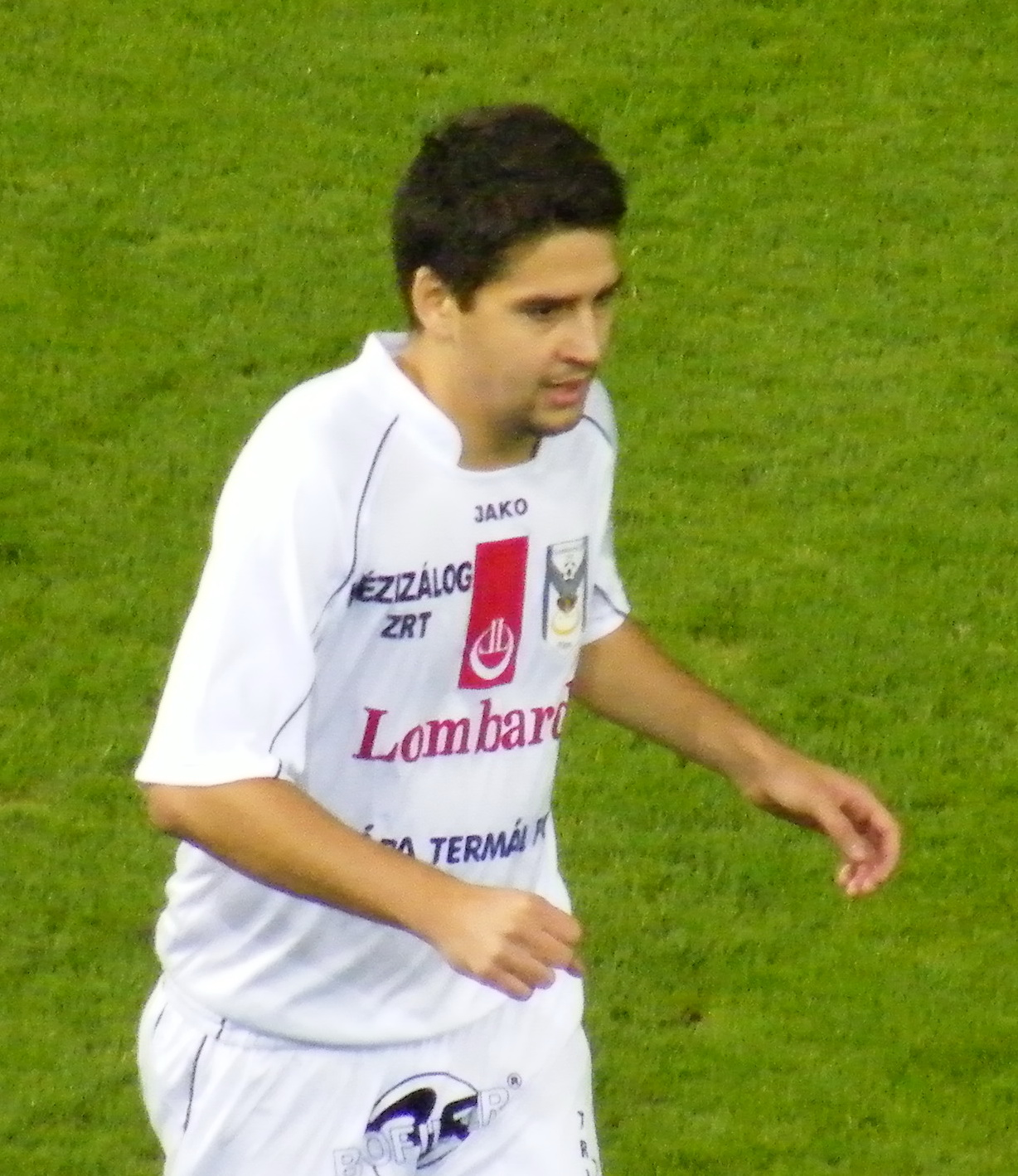

Personal information
- Date of birth: 26 March 1987 (age 39)
- Place of birth: Kiskunhalas, Hungary
- Height: 1.84 m (6 ft 0 in)
- Position: Midfielder

Team information
- Current team: Dunaújváros

Senior career*
Years	Team	Apps	(Gls)
2005–2007	Dunaújváros	33	(4)
2007–2015	Pápa	185	(4)
2015–2022	Szeged-Csanád	127	(11)
2022–	Dunaújváros	5	(1)
- * Club domestic league appearances and goals as of 16 October 2022

Gábor Tóth (born 26 March 1987) is a Hungarian football player who plays for Dunaújváros.

== Career statistics ==
Appearances and goals by club, season and competition
Club	Season	League			Cup		League Cup		Europe		Total	
Club	Season	Division	Apps	Goals	Apps	Goals	Apps	Goals	Apps	Goals	Apps	Goals
Dunaújváros
Dunaújváros	2005–06	Nemzeti Bajnokság II	18	2	0	0	0	0	0	0	18	2
Dunaújváros	2006–07	Nemzeti Bajnokság II	15	2	3	0	0	0	0	0	18	2
Dunaújváros	Total		33	4	3	0	0	0	0	0	36	4
Pápa
Pápa	2006–07	Nemzeti Bajnokság II	14	0	0	0	0	0	0	0	14	0
Pápa	2007–08	Nemzeti Bajnokság II	26	0	0	0	0	0	0	0	26	0
Pápa	2008–09	Nemzeti Bajnokság II	24	1	4	0	4	0	0	0	32	1
Pápa	2009–10	Nemzeti Bajnokság I	25	2	3	0	4	1	0	0	32	3
Pápa	2010–11	Nemzeti Bajnokság I	11	0	2	0	4	1	0	0	17	1
Pápa	2011–12	Nemzeti Bajnokság I	22	1	1	0	9	2	0	0	32	3
Pápa	2012–13	Nemzeti Bajnokság I	25	0	2	1	8	0	0	0	35	1
Pápa	2013–14	Nemzeti Bajnokság I	23	0	5	0	7	3	0	0	35	3
Pápa	2014–15	Nemzeti Bajnokság I	16	0	1	0	3	0	0	0	20	0
Pápa	Total		185	4	18	1	39	7	0	0	243	8
Career total			219	8	21	1	39	7	0	0	279	16

Updated to games played as of 6 December 2014.
