= Mihály Szabó =

Hungarian Reformed clergyman

- Szabó Mihály
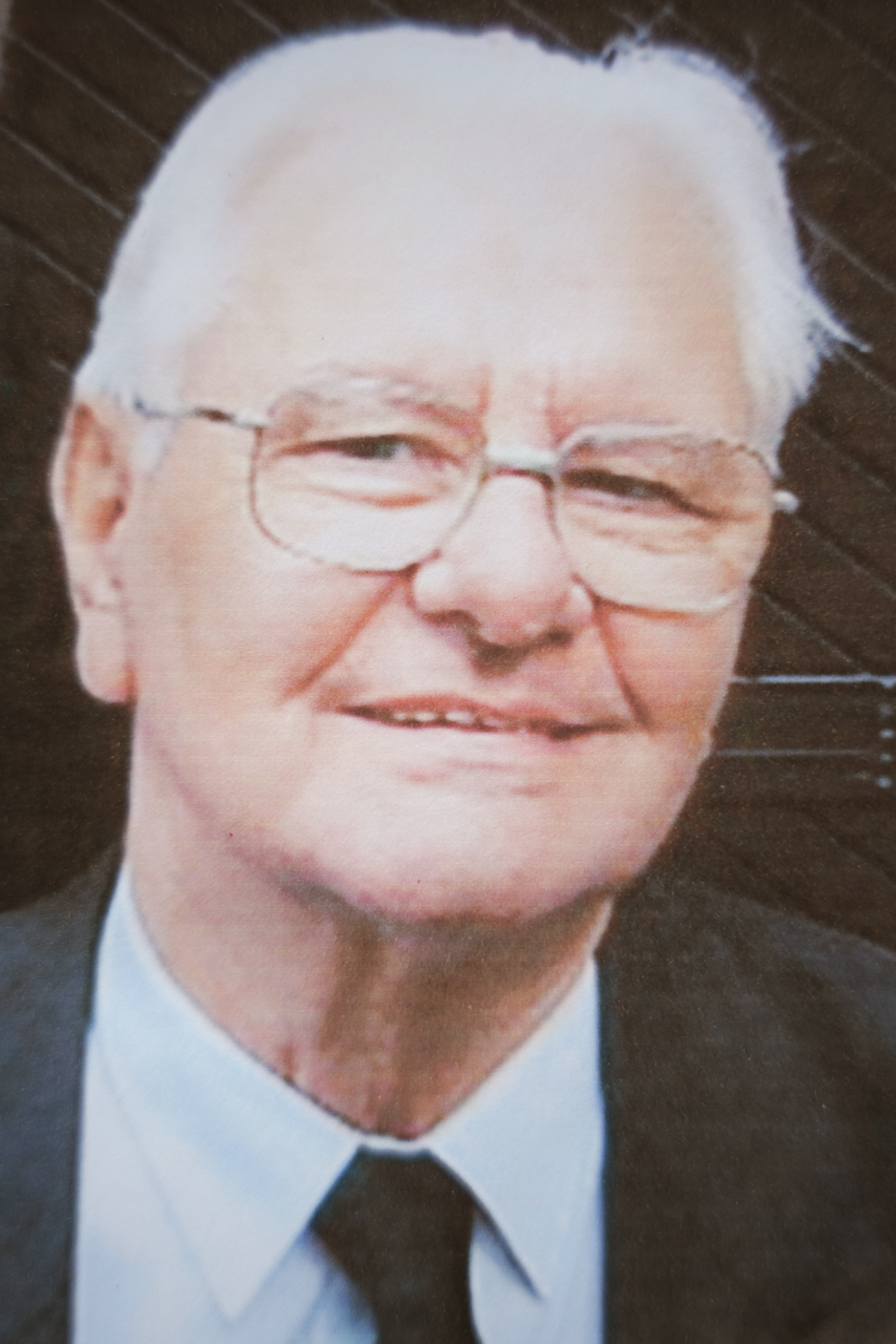
- Born: July 13, 1933; Budapest
- Died: February 13, 2011 (aged 77); Budapest, Hungary
- Citizenship: Hungarian
- Education: Budapesti Református Teológiai Akadémia
- Spouse: Klára Szabó
- Children: 5
- Awards: Mohács Város Tisztelete Jeléül Kitüntető Díj, Award for the support and exemplary education of youth

Mihály Szabó (Budapest, July 13, 1933 – Budapest, February 13, 2011), Hungarian Reformed pastor.

== Early years, studies ==
Mihály Szabó, was born on July 13, 1933, in Budapest, Hungary.

His father, Dr. Mihály Szabó, was a lawyer. He was also the congregation's general-superintendent during the construction of the church of the Pasaréti Református Egyházközség and the legal adviser of the Vértesaljai Református Egyházmegye.

His mother, Erzsébet Benkő, was the descendant of a renowned Transylvanian Reformed clerical dynasty dating back hundreds of years on her father's side. His great-great-grandfather, János Benkő, built the Reformed church in Sepsimálnás. Among his ancestors were several internationally renowned clergymen, such as József Benkő, a linguist, historian, and botanist and Ferenc Benkő, a mineralogist.

Mihály Szabó spent his childhood in Zugliget in Budapest, and after the Second World War they moved to Pasarét. He studied at the Lónyay Utcai Református Gimnázium, where he graduated in 1951. He continued his studies at the Budapesti Református Teológiai Akadémia. In addition to theology, he did youth work in the Pasarét Reformed congregation under the guidance of his paternal friend Sándor Joó, a pastor. At the outbreak of the Hungarian Revolution of 1956, Szabó was the senior at the Budapest seminary, i.e. the senior of the students, and with his fellow theologians joined the demonstration of the students of the Budapest University of Technology.

Szabó graduated from the seminary in 1957. In the same year he married Klára Pinczés, a teacher.

== Career ==
=== Jászberény ===
After graduation he became an assistant pastor in Jászberény in 1957 where their first two children were born. In 1958 the Állami Egyházügyi Hivatal (ÁEH), the communist state organization supervising the churches announced the fight against "clerical reaction". As part of this, young pastors who had graduated from the Budapesti Református Teológiai Akadémia and were involved in the revolutionary events were exiled from the capital. Szabó was transferred from Jászberény to Baranya, like several of his former Budapest theologian fellows, such as Loránt Hegedűs, András Bóka, and Péter Czanik, only to remain there for decades, or even permanently, at a "safe distance" in the most remote, southernmost county of the country.

=== Small villages of Baranya ===
On July 2, 1961 Mihály Szabó was registered as the pastor of the Reformed congregation of Belvárdgyula, a village of barely 700 people and a Reformed congregation of 200. Belvárdgyula had five sporadic congregations, which in the early days he could only reach by bicycle or on dirt roads. Over time, new, larger congregations were added. By January 1970 Babarc and Bóly and their congregations had also been added, so that he now ministered in 10 settlements. The background where it was all "provided" from was the uncomfortable rectory in Belvárdgyula, where, after the birth of two more children, their family had grown to six. His wife regularly accompanied him to the services on Sundays.

In July 1970 Sándor Joó died, and in his will, he nominated Mihály Szabó as his successor as pastor of the congregation of Pasarét. The ÁEH, however, did not change its strategy against the "clerical reaction" of 1958 and ignored Joó's will, thus even after 10 years Szabó was not allowed to return to Budapest from Baranya.

=== Mohács ===
15 years later in 1976, the year after the birth of their youngest daughter, their fifth child Mónika, Szabó was given his first chance to leave Belvárdgyula. However, without the approval of the ÁEH, still nothing could be done in the churches, and even after a long waiting period it was reluctant to grant Szabó permission. His ecclesiastical superior confided that the decision was slow because 'up there' he was not considered a 'good cadre', as he was too dedicated and effective in his work to renew the spiritual life of the congregations and people around him. Szabó was finally granted permission to serve in Mohács, where they were to move into a dilapidated rectory with waterlogged walls. However, under Szabó's leadership with the help of donations from the local congregation and foreign grants, the parish house was made habitable in less than six months.

The congregation of Kölked, a village without a pastor, and close to Mohács and to the Croatian border, was also annexed to Mohács. Even around his new location, following the years in Belvárdgyula, Szabó had no shortage of congregations: Hímesháza, Nagynyárád, Majs, Lánycsók, Székelyszabar, Szűr, Palotabozsok, Véménd, Homorúd and Sátorhely were all included. His wife, who by this time had also obtained a degree in theology along with her teaching degree, continued to assist him in his ministry.

Szabó was a committed ecumenical believer, and in Mohács he maintained excellent relations with the pastors of other denominations, with whom he regularly organized joint, universal prayer weeks. He maintained close contacts with Hungarians beyond the motherland, especially in Transcarpathia and Transylvania, which he visited regularly and served in several Hungarian Reformed congregations. From 1991, after the outbreak of the Yugoslav Wars, he organized the reception and care of Hungarian and non-Hungarian refugees from the South in and around Mohács, including Kölked.

=== Kölked ===
Szabó, who with friends had previously organized unauthorized Christian conferences for children's and youth, saw the possibility of establishing a permanent Reformed conference venue in the vacant premises of the parish in Kölked. However, such a religious complex could only be started illegally under the threat of serious reprisals, so he approached his bishop, Károly Tóth, with his idea. The bishop made him clear that he could not officially grant him a permit because of the ÁEH, but if he insisted in implementing his idea offered him a Gentlemen's Agreement promising to protect Szabó from possible retaliation in the future. The promise was kept and the Reformed Conference House, which has been in operation for almost 50 years and often referred to as "Mihály Szabó's doctorate", came into being.

== The last years ==
Szabó retired in 2001, succeeded by Zsolt Wébel. He and his wife continued their retirement in Mohács. The service in Baranya became his life, and even after the start of his pension he regularly helped his successor.

In 2001 he received his Golden Diploma from the Károli Gáspár University of the Reformed Church in Hungary.

In 2004, he suffered a stroke from which he never fully recovered. In 2008, after 51 years, they moved to Budapest.

Mihály Szabó died at the age of 77, on his mother's 100th birthday, on February 13, 2011, surrounded by his family.

On February 18, 2011, his former congregations in Baranya bid him farewell in the reformed church of Mohács. The next day, his funeral service was held in the Lutheran church in Maglód, a town where his daughter Klára was the pastor of the Reformed church. Bible verse at his funeral:

’Because I know whom I have believed, and am convinced that he is able to guard what I have entrusted to him until that day.’ (2 Timothy 1:12)

Mihály Szabó's ashes have been resting in the church cemetery in Maglód since February 19, 2011.

== Family ==
Mihály Szabó's wife, Klára Pinczés Mihályné Szabó, was a teacher of Hungarian language and literature; a novelist and a Reformed pastor; she died on March 25, 2016.

They have five children and ten grandchildren.

== Award ==
He was awarded the Mohács Város Tisztelete Jeléül Kitüntető Díj, award for the support and exemplary education of youth (2001).
