= Klára Szabó =

Hungarian Reformed pastor, teacher, writer

- Klára Pinczés
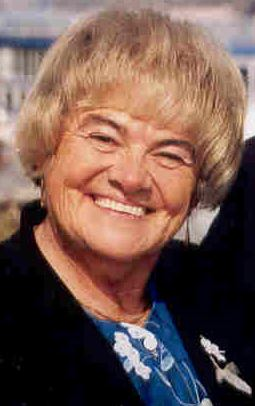
- Born: 17 March 1935; Újpest
- Died: 25 March 2016 (aged 81); Budapest, Hungary
- Citizenship: Hungarian
- Education: Budapesti Református Teológiai Akadémia
- Occupation: Teacher pastor novelist
- Spouse: Mihály Szabó

Klára Szabó, full name: Klára Pinczés Mihályné Szabó (Újpest, 17 March 1935 – Budapest, 25 March 2016) Hungarian Reformed pastor, teacher and novelist.

== Early years, studies ==
Klára Pinczés was born as a low-weight premature baby with little chance of survival.

She grew up in Újpest (now part of Budapest), in its Megyer district. After completing her studies at the Megyeri úti Állami Általános Iskola, she finished high school at the Kanizsay Dorottya Leánygimnázium in Újpest. Afterwards she graduated from the Apáczai Csere János Pedagógiai Főiskola, and received her teacher's degree with honours in Hungarian language and literature from the Szeged Pedagógiai Főiskola in the summer of 1956. She subsequently worked as a teacher in Törtel and Nógrádverőce.

In 1952, she met Mihály Szabó, who had just graduated from high school and was preparing for Reformed theological studies. They decided to marry five years later, after completing their higher education.

After Mihály Szabó obtained his theology degree, they married in 1957.

== Life course ==
=== Teacher ===
Following their marriage in 1957, Klára Szabó (Hungarian name form after marriage: 'Szabó Mihályné') and her husband moved to Jászberény, where she taught for three years at the local primary school on Kossuth Street. Their first two children were born there.

In 1958 the Állami Egyházügyi Hivatal (ÁEH), the communist state organization supervising the churches announced the fight against "clerical reaction". As part of this, young pastors who had graduated from the reformed university Budapesti Református Teológiai Akadémia and were involved in the 1956 revolutionary events were exiled from the capital. Mihály Szabó, who had participated in the 1956 revolution as a student leader ('senior'), was reassigned with his family from Jászberény to Baranya County. He became the pastor of the small, isolated village of Belvárdgyula, which had a Reformed congregation of 200 members within a total population of around 700.

Mrs. Szabó taught in the school nearest to Belvárdgyula in Olasz, 6 km away, where pupils came from a 10 km radius. As time went by, more and larger scattered congregations were attached to her husband.

For the practice of her teaching profession, his husband's pastoral ministry and creation of a family life, the uncomfortable rectory in Belvárdgyula "provided" the background, where after the birth of two more children the family grew to six. Klára Szabó also regularly accompanied her husband to the services in the sporadic villages on Sundays.

The year after the birth of their youngest daughter, their fifth child, Mónika, in 1976, after 15 years, the head of the family received permission to continue his ministry finally in a town,^{[8]} in Mohács, where a dilapidated parsonage with waterlogged walls awaited them. The local congregation, with the help of donations and foreign grants, made the parish habitable in six months. Mrs. Szabó continued teaching at a primary school Széchenyi téri Általános Iskola in Mohács.

=== Pastor ===
Klára Szabó enrolled in the first correspondence course at the Budapesti Református Teológiai Akadémia in 1978, where she received a pastor's diploma and was ordained a pastor in 1987. This enabled her to serve as a pastor on her own, and in 1988 she pastored congregations in the Bóly-Babarc-Belvárdgyula Community, then in the villages of Siklós, Drávaszabolcs and five other villages along the Drava River. The church of Kölked, a village on the border with Mohács and Yugoslavia, which was left without a pastor, was also attached to the congregation of Mohács, as well as Hímesháza, Nagynyárád, Majs, Lánycsók, Székelyszabar, Szűr, Palotabozsok, Véménd, Homorúd and Sátorhely were all dispersed congregations to be attended, and Mrs. Szabó attended them together with her husband, in addition to her teaching duties at school.

Klára Szabó was a committed ecumenical believer, and she and her husband maintained excellent relations with the pastors of other denominations in Mohács, with whom they regularly organized a joint, universal prayer week. She maintained close relations with Hungarians outside the motherland, especially Délvidék (Vojvodina and surrounding regions), Transcarpathia and Transylvania. She visited these places regularly and served in several Hungarian Reformed congregations. After the outbreak of the Yugoslav Wars in 1991, she and her husband played a crucial role in organizing the reception and care of Hungarian and non-Hungarian refugees from Vojvodina in Mohács and surrounding areas, including Kölked.

=== Novelist ===
She retired from teaching in the early 2000s but continued her church service informally.

During Easter 2005, she published her first diary novel, followed by five more by 2014. She was a regular guest at literary events and book readings.

== Family ==
Mrs. Szabó's husband, Mihály Szabó, served as a Reformed pastor until his passing on 13 February 2011, in Budapest, where they had moved from Mohács for their retirement years.

Klára Szabó died on Good Friday, 25 March 2016, at the age of 81. She was laid to rest beside her husband in the church cemetery in Maglód.

They had five children and ten grandchildren.

== Bibliography ==
- Szabó Mihályné Pinczés Klára ,,Köröttünk már az élet csörtetett..." Baráti-Missziós-Szolgálat. 2005. ISBN 963-217-813-0
- Szabó Mihályné Pinczés Klára A szeretet napsugarában Baráti-Missziós-Szolgálat. 2006.
- Szabó Mihályné Pinczés Klára Holtomiglan vagy holtáiglan... Baráti-Missziós-Szolgálat. 2007.
- Szabó Mihályné Pinczés Klára ,,Tovább is van, mondjam még?" BARÁTI MISSZIÓS ALAPÍTVÁNY. 2010. ISBN 978-963-88782-0-5
- Szabó Mihályné Pinczés Klára ,,Ne féljetek...!" bajtól, betegségtől, haláltól BMSZ. 2012. ISBN 978-963-88782-4-3
- Szabó Mihályné Pinczés Klára A napsugár találja meg mindig ablakodat! BMA. 2014. ISBN 978-963-88782-6-7
