= 2014–15 Újpest FC season =

Újpest FC
2014–15 season
- Chairman: Roderick Duchâtelet
- Manager: Nebojša Vignjević
- Stadium: Ferenc Szusza Stadium
- Nemzeti Bajnokság I: 6th
- Magyar Kupa: Semi-finals
- Ligakupa: Round of 16
- Szuperkupa: Winners
- Top goalscorer: League: Krisztián Simon (6); All: Krisztián Simon (9)
- Highest home attendance: 8,500 (vs Ferencváros, 21 September 2014)
- Lowest home attendance: 200 (vs Ajka, 11 November 2014)
- Average home league attendance: 2,352
Home colours	Away colours

The 2014–15 season was Újpest Football Club's 109th competitive season, 103rd consecutive season in the OTP Bank Liga and 129th year in existence as a football club.

== First team squad ==
Note: Flags indicate national team as defined under FIFA eligibility rules; some limited exceptions apply. Players may hold more than one non-FIFA nationality.

No.	Pos.	Nation	Player
1	GK	HUN	Szabolcs Balajcza
2	DF	FRA	Loïc Nego (loan from Charlton)
3	DF	BEL	Jonathan Heris
4	MF	SRB	Filip Stanisavljević
5	DF	HUN	Róbert Litauszki
8	MF	HUN	Balázs Balogh
9	FW	NGR	Kim Ojo
11	FW	MNE	Mihailo Perović
14	MF	HUN	Gábor Nagy
17	DF	HUN	Gyula Forró
18	MF	MNE	Bojan Sanković

No.	Pos.	Nation	Player
19	MF	SRB	Nemanja Andrić
20	MF	GHA	Aaron Addo
22	FW	HUN	Péter Kabát
23	GK	HUN	Dávid Banai
25	DF	HUN	Viktor Vadász
26	DF	SVK	Dávid Hudák
27	DF	HUN	Sándor Molnár
29	MF	MKD	Enis Bardhi
55	DF	RUS	Sandro Tsveiba
99	FW	BIH	Asmir Suljić

== Transfers ==
=== Summer ===
In: Note: Flags indicate national team as defined under FIFA eligibility rules; some limited exceptions apply. Players may hold more than one non-FIFA nationality.

No.	Pos.	Nation	Player
—	MF	BEL	Jérémy Serwy (from (Germany) Borussia Dortmund II)
—	MF	HUN	Gergő Holdampf (from Zalaegerszeg)
—	FW	ALB	Berat Ahmeti (from (Kosovo) Prishtina)
—	DF	COL	Darwin Andrade (from (Belgium) St. Truiden)
—	MF	MNE	Nebojša Kosović (loan from (Belgium) Standard Liège)
—	MF	HUN	Gábor Nagy (from Haladás)
—	DF	HUN	Gyula Forró (from Kecskemét)
—	DF	HUN	Viktor Vadász (from Diósgyőr)
—	FW	FIN	Aristote Mboma (from (Finland) Honka)
—	DF	URU	Rodrigo Rojo (from (Uruguay) Fénix)
—	DF	HUN	Marcell Fodor (loan return from Ajka)
—	DF	BEL	Naïm Aarab (loan return from (Belgium) St. Truiden)
—	MF	TOG	Henri Eninful (loan return from Kecskemét)

Out: Note: Flags indicate national team as defined under FIFA eligibility rules; some limited exceptions apply. Players may hold more than one non-FIFA nationality.

No.	Pos.	Nation	Player
2	DF	COL	Darwin Andrade (loan to (Belgium) Standard Liège)
2	DF	HUN	Marcell Fodor (to Zalaegerszeg)
5	DF	ESP	Juanan (to (Spain) Recreativo de Huelva)
9	FW	COD	Jean-Marc Makasu (loan return to (Belgium) Standard Liège)
10	MF	MNE	Nebojša Kosović (loan return to (Belgium) Standard Liège)
11	FW	EST	Jarmo Ahjupera (to (Estonia) Nõmme Kalju)
13	MF	KEN	Hisham Said
15	MF	BEL	Nikolas Proesmans
16	FW	HUN	Bence Lázár (loan to Nyíregyháza)
17	DF	ESP	Chema Antón
20	MF	TOG	Henri Eninful (to Kecskemét)
24	DF	BEL	Simon Ligot (loan return to (Belgium) Standard Liège)
26	FW	HUN	Balázs Zamostny (loan to Haladás)
34	DF	BEL	Naïm Aarab
35	DF	BIH	Bojan Mihajlović
55	DF	BEL	Pierre-Yves Ngawa (loan return to (Belgium) Standard Liège)

- List of Hungarian football transfers summer 2014

=== Winter ===
In: Note: Flags indicate national team as defined under FIFA eligibility rules; some limited exceptions apply. Players may hold more than one non-FIFA nationality.

No.	Pos.	Nation	Player
—	MF	GHA	Aaron Addo
—	FW	MNE	Mihailo Perović (from (Montenegro) Budućnost Podgorica)
—	MF	SRB	Nemanja Andrić (loan from Győri ETO)
—	DF	SVK	Dávid Hudák (loan from (Slovakia) Slovan Bratislava)
—	FW	HUN	Balázs Zamostny (loan return from Szombathelyi Haladás)

Out: Note: Flags indicate national team as defined under FIFA eligibility rules; some limited exceptions apply. Players may hold more than one non-FIFA nationality.

No.	Pos.	Nation	Player
7	FW	HUN	Krisztián Simon (to (Germany) 1860 Munich)
10	MF	MNE	Nebojša Kosović (loan return to (Belgium) Standard Liège)
11	FW	ESP	Dani Ponce (loan return to (Spain) Alcorcón)
15	FW	FIN	Aristote M'Boma
16	DF	URU	Rodrigo Rojo (loan to (Belgium) Sint-Truiden)
20	MF	BEL	Jérémy Serwy (to (Iceland) FH)
26	FW	HUN	Balázs Zamostny (to Soproni VSE)
28	DF	HUN	János Nagy (loan to BFC Siófok)
36	GK	SRB	Marko Dmitrović (to (England) Charlton)

== Statistics ==
=== Appearances and goals ===
Last updated on 26 October 2014.

No.	Pos	Nat	Player	Total		OTP Bank Liga		Hungarian Cup		League Cup	
No.	Pos	Nat	Player	Apps	Goals	Apps	Goals	Apps	Goals	Apps	Goals
1	GK	(Hungary) HUN	Szabolcs Balajcza	13	-7	12	-7	0	0	1	0
2	DF	(Colombia) COL	Darwin Andrade	1	0	1	0	0	0	0	0
2	DF	(France) FRA	Loïc Nego	11	1	6	0	2	1	3	0
3	DF	(Belgium) BEL	Jonathan Heris	16	0	12	0	2	0	2	0
4	MF	(Serbia) SRB	Filip Stanisavljević	14	4	9	2	2	1	3	1
5	DF	(Hungary) HUN	Róbert Litauszki	15	0	12	0	1	0	2	0
6	MF	(Serbia) SRB	Dušan Vasiljević	15	4	11	2	1	2	3	0
7	MF	(Hungary) HUN	Krisztián Simon	14	8	12	5	2	3	0	0
8	MF	(Hungary) HUN	Balázs Balogh	14	0	12	0	1	0	1	0
10	MF	(Montenegro) MNE	Nebojša Kosović	14	0	9	0	2	0	3	0
11	MF	(Spain) ESP	Dani Ponce	5	4	2	0	1	2	2	2
14	MF	(Hungary) HUN	Gábor Nagy	14	0	11	0	2	0	1	0
15	FW	(Finland) FIN	Aristote M'Boma	13	2	7	0	3	1	3	1
16	DF	(Uruguay) URU	Rodrigo Rojo	9	0	4	0	2	0	3	0
17	DF	(Hungary) HUN	Gyula Forró	15	0	11	0	2	0	2	0
19	FW	(Albania) ALB	Berat Ahmeti	11	0	4	0	3	0	4	0
25	DF	(Hungary) HUN	Viktor Vadász	14	0	9	0	2	0	3	0
28	DF	(Hungary) HUN	János Nagy	7	0	2	0	1	0	4	0
29	MF	(North Macedonia) MKD	Enis Bardhi	9	4	6	1	2	3	1	0
99	MF	(Bosnia and Herzegovina) BIH	Asmir Suljić	18	4	12	2	3	2	3	0
Youth players:
9	FW	(Nigeria) NGR	Kim Ojo	1	2	0	0	1	2	0	0
18	MF	(Croatia) CRO	Bojan Sanković	1	0	0	0	0	0	1	0
20	MF	(Belgium) BEL	Jérémy Serwy	3	1	0	0	1	1	2	0
23	GK	(Hungary) HUN	Dávid Banai	3	-4	0	0	1	0	2	-4
27	FW	(Hungary) HUN	Bálint Szalánszki	3	0	0	0	0	0	3	0
30	MF	(Hungary) HUN	Patrik Marques	5	0	0	0	1	0	4	0
32	MF	(Hungary) HUN	Gergő Holdampf	4	0	0	0	1	0	3	0
36	GK	(Serbia) SRB	Marko Dmitrović	3	-3	0	0	2	-1	1	-2
55	DF	(Russia) RUS	Sandro Tsveiba	5	2	0	0	1	0	4	2
Players no longer at the club:

=== Top scorers ===
Includes all competitive matches. The list is sorted by shirt number when total goals are equal.

Last updated on 26 October 2014

Position	Nation	Number	Name	OTP Bank Liga	Hungarian Cup	League Cup	Total
1	(Hungary)	7	Krisztián Simon	5	3	0	8
2	(Bosnia and Herzegovina)	99	Asmir Suljić	2	2	0	4
3	(Serbia)	6	Dušan Vasiljević	2	2	0	4
4	(Serbia)	4	Filip Stanisavljević	2	1	1	4
5	(North Macedonia)	29	Enis Bardhi	1	3	0	4
6	(Spain)	11	Dani Ponce	0	2	2	4
7	(Nigeria)	9	Kim Ojo	0	2	0	2
8	(Finland)	15	Aristote M'Boma	0	1	1	2
9	(Russia)	55	Sandro Tsveiba	0	0	2	2
10	(Belgium)	20	Jérémy Serwy	0	1	0	1
11	(France)	2	Loïc Nego	0	1	0	1
/	/	/	Own Goals	0	0	0	0
			TOTALS	12	18	6	36

=== Disciplinary record ===
Includes all competitive matches. Players with 1 card or more included only.

Last updated on 26 October 2014

Position	Nation	Number	Name	OTP Bank Liga		Hungarian Cup		League Cup		Total (Hu Total)	
Position	Nation	Number	Name	Yellow card	Red card	Yellow card	Red card	Yellow card	Red card	Yellow card	Red card
DF	(France)	2	Loïc Nego	1	0	0	0	1	0	2 (1)	0 (0)
DF	(Belgium)	3	Jonathan Heris	4	0	1	0	0	0	5 (4)	0 (0)
DF	(Hungary)	5	Róbert Litauszki	2	0	1	0	0	0	3 (2)	0 (0)
MF	(Serbia)	6	Dušan Vasiljević	1	0	0	0	0	0	1 (1)	0 (0)
MF	(Hungary)	8	Balázs Balogh	2	0	0	0	0	0	2 (2)	0 (0)
MF	(Hungary)	14	Gábor Nagy	6	0	0	0	0	0	6 (6)	0 (0)
FW	(Finland)	15	Aristote M'Boma	0	0	1	0	0	0	1 (0)	0 (0)
DF	(Uruguay)	16	Rodrigo Rojo	0	0	0	0	1	0	1 (0)	0 (0)
DF	(Hungary)	17	Gyula Forró	2	0	0	0	0	0	2 (2)	0 (0)
MF	(Croatia)	18	Bojan Sanković	0	0	0	0	1	0	1 (0)	0 (0)
DF	(Hungary)	25	Viktor Vadász	0	0	0	0	1	0	1 (0)	0 (0)
FW	(Hungary)	26	Bálint Szalánszki	0	0	0	0	1	0	1 (0)	0 (0)
DF	(Russia)	55	Sandro Tsveiba	0	0	0	0	2	0	2 (0)	0 (0)
MF	(Bosnia and Herzegovina)	99	Asmir Suljić	3	0	0	0	0	0	3 (3)	0 (0)
			TOTALS	21	0	3	0	7	0	31 (21)	0 (0)

=== Overall ===
Games played	18 (12 OTP Bank Liga, 3 Hungarian Cup and 4 Hungarian League Cup)
Games won	9 (5 OTP Bank Liga, 3 Hungarian Cup and 2 Hungarian League Cup)
Games drawn	7 (6 OTP Bank Liga, 0 Hungarian Cup and 1 Hungarian League Cup)
Games lost	2 (1 OTP Bank Liga, 0 Hungarian Cup and 1 Hungarian League Cup)
Goals scored	36
Goals conceded	14
Goal difference	+22
Yellow cards	31
Red cards	0
Worst discipline	(Hungary) Gábor Nagy (6 (yellow card) , 0 (red card) )
Best result	13–0 (A) v Himesháza - Magyar Kupa - 09–09–2014
Worst result	0–2 (A) v Videoton - OTP Bank Liga - 14–09–2014
Worst result	1–3 (A) v Videoton - Ligakupa - 07–10–2014
Most appearances	(Bosnia and Herzegovina) Asmir Suljić (18 appearances)
Top scorer	(Hungary) Krisztián Simon (8 goals)
Points	37/57 (64.91%)

Last updated: 26 October 2014

== Nemzeti Bajnokság I ==
=== Matches ===
26 July 2014 1	Haladás	0 – 1	Újpest	Szombathely, Vas County
20:30 CEST		Report	Suljić 83'	Stadium: Rohonci Street Stadium; Attendance: 2,950; Referee: (Hungary) Péter Solymosi

3 August 2014 2	Újpest	1 – 1	Diósgyőr	Budapest, Pest County
20:30 CEST	Suljić 61'	Report	Grumić 53'	Stadium: Szusza Ferenc Stadium; Attendance: 3,605; Referee: (Hungary) István Vad

9 August 2014 3	Pécs	1 – 1	Újpest	Pécs, Baranya County
18:30 CEST	Mohl 44' (pen.)	Report	Simon 55'	Stadium: Stadion PMFC; Attendance: 1,852; Referee: (Hungary) József Erdős

16 August 2014 4	Újpest	1 – 0	Debrecen	Budapest, Pest County
20:30 CEST	Simon 90'	Report		Stadium: Szusza Ferenc Stadium; Attendance: 3,200; Referee: (Hungary) Zoltán Iványi

23 August 2014 5	Paks	0 – 0	Újpest	Paks, Tolna County
16:30 CEST		Report		Stadium: Stadion PSE; Attendance: 2,658; Referee: (Hungary) Ádám Németh

30 August 2014 6	Újpest	0 – 0	Honvéd	Budapest, Pest County
16:30 CEST		Report		Stadium: Szusza Ferenc Stadium; Attendance: 3,437; Referee: (Hungary) Sándor Andó-Szabó

14 September 2014 7	Videoton	2 – 0	Újpest	Székesfehérvár, Fejér County
16:30 CEST	Juhász 38'; Nikolić 51'	Report		Stadium: Sóstói Stadion; Attendance: 4,650; Referee: (Hungary) Zoltán Iványi

21 September 2014 8	Újpest	2 – 1	Ferencváros	Budapest, Pest County
16:30 CEST	Vasiljević 52' (pen.); Simon 72'	Report	Mateos 56' (pen.)	Stadium: Szusza Ferenc Stadium; Attendance: 8,500; Referee: (Hungary) Ádám Farkas

27 September 2014 9	Pápa	0 – 0	Újpest	Pápa, Veszprém County
20:30 CEST		Report		Stadium: Stadion Várkerti; Attendance: 960; Referee: (Hungary) Ádám Németh

4 October 2014 10	Újpest	3 – 0	Dunaújváros	Budapest, Pest County
20:00 CEST	Vasiljević 37' (pen.); Simon 87'; Stanisavljević 90+3'	Report		Stadium: Szusza Ferenc Stadium; Attendance: 2,050; Referee: (Hungary) Csaba Pintér

19 October 2014 11	Győr	0 – 0	Újpest	Győr, Győr-Moson-Sopron County
18:30 CEST		Report		Stadium: ETO Park; Attendance: 3,048; Referee: (Hungary) Ádám Farkas

24 October 2014 12	Újpest	3 – 2	Nyíregyháza	Budapest, Pest County
19:00 CEST	Simon 12'; Bardhi 27'; Stanisavljević 83'	Report	Pekár 42'; Molnár 88'	Stadium: Szusza Ferenc Stadium; Attendance: 2,000; Referee: (Hungary) József Erdős

2 November 2014 13	MTK Budapest	0-1	Újpest	Budapest, Pest County
16:30 CET	Vukmir (yellow card) 73'	Summary	Nagy (yellow card) 55'; Heris (yellow card) 64'; Balogh 85'	Stadium: Bozsik Stadion; Attendance: 1,700; Referee: (Hungary) Zolten Ivanyi

8 November 2014 14	Újpest	1-1	Puskás Academy	Budapest, Pest County
16:00 CET	Simon 48'; Vasiljević (yellow card) 89'	Summary	Szakály 47'; Vaszicsku (yellow card) 66' (yellow-red card); Lencse (yellow card) 68'; Kelić (yellow card) 76'	Stadium: Szusza Ferenc Stadium; Attendance: 3,000; Referee: (Hungary) István Vad

21 November 2014 15	Kecskemét	2-0	Újpest	Kecskemét, Bács-Kiskun County
19:00 CET	Ojo 5' (o.g.); Balogh 30' (o.g.); Lovrić (yellow card) 35'; Botka (yellow card) 83'; Gréczi (yellow card) 90+1'	Summary	Vadász (yellow card) 11'; Heris (yellow card) 33'; Litauszki (yellow card) 73'	Stadium: Széktói Stadion; Attendance: 1,525; Referee: (Hungary) Viktor Kassai

29 November 2014 16	Újpest	1-0	Haladás	Budapest, Pest County
14:00 CET	Stanisavljević 76'; Bardhi (red card) 85'	Summary	Jagodics (yellow card) 38' (yellow-red card); Zsirai (yellow card) 39' (yellow-red card); Iszlai (yellow card) 72'; Schimmer (yellow card) 74'	Stadium: Szusza Ferenc Stadium; Attendance: 1,806; Referee: (Hungary) Adam Farkas

7 December 2014 17	Diósgyőr	2-1	Újpest	Miskolc, Borsod-Abaúj-Zemplén County
16:30 CET	Elek 9'; Gosztonyi (yellow card) 79'; Okuka (yellow card) 83'; Griffiths 90'	Summary	Suljić 3' (yellow card) 63'; Nego (yellow card) 30'	Stadium: DVTK Stadion; Attendance: 5,774; Referee: (Hungary) Tamás Bognár

28 February 2015 18	Újpest	0-2	Pécsi MFC	Budapest, Pest County
18:30 CET	Forró (yellow card) 23'; Nagy (yellow card) 30' (yellow-red card); Heris (red card) 88'	Summary	James 12'; Uzoma (yellow card) 50'; Rácz 90'	Stadium: Szusza Ferenc Stadium; Attendance: 1,684; Referee: (Hungary) Fabian Mihaly

8 March 2015 19	Debreceni VSC	0-0	Újpest	Debrecen, Hajdú-Bihar County
18:30 CET	Szakály (yellow card) 81'	Summary	Stanisavljević (yellow card) 29'; Litauszki (yellow card) 66'	Stadium: Nagyerdei Stadion; Attendance: 5,014; Referee: (Hungary) Jozsef Erdos

14 March 2015 20	Újpest	1-2	Paksi SE	Budapest, Pest County
18:30 CET	Suljić (yellow card) 13'; Hudák (yellow card) 15'; Litauszki (yellow card) 32'; Bardhi 45'	Summary	Haraszti 6'; Bertus 32'; Tamási (yellow card) 55' (yellow-red card); Kecskés (yellow card) 73'	Stadium: Szusza Ferenc Stadium; Attendance: 1,500; Referee: (Hungary) Csaba Pinter

21 March 2015 21	Honvéd	2-2	Újpest	Budapest, Pest County
18:30 CET	Kosnić (yellow card) 19'; Hidi 33'; Prosser 52'	Summary	Hudák (yellow card) 4'; Vasiljević 20' (pen.); Andrić 42'; Balogh (yellow card) 73'	Stadium: Bozsik Stadion; Attendance: 1,000; Referee: (Hungary) Zoltán Iványi

=== Classification ===
Pos	Team	Pld	W	D	L	GF	GA	GD	Pts	Qualification or relegation
4	Debrecen	30	15	9	6	44	19	+25	54	Qualification for Europa League first qualifying round
5	Paks	30	14	9	7	44	27	+17	51	
6	Újpest	30	14	9	7	40	28	+12	51	
7	Diósgyőr	30	13	9	8	43	36	+7	48	
8	Győr (R)	30	10	8	12	41	44	−3	38	Relegation to Nemzeti Bajnokság III (Note: Győr won't be a member of 2015–16 Nemzeti Bajnokság I due to financial and licence problems)

Source: mlsz.hu (in Hungarian)
Rules for classification: 1st points; 2nd overall wins; 3rd goal difference; 4th head-to-head points; 5th head-to-head goal difference; 6th head-to-head away goals scored; 7th fair-play points; 8th drawing of lots
(R) Relegated

=== Results summary ===
Overall								Home						Away					
Pld	W	D	L	GF	GA	GD	Pts	W	D	L	GF	GA	GD	W	D	L	GF	GA	GD
12	5	6	1	12	7	+5	21	4	2	0	10	4	+6	1	4	1	2	3	−1

Last updated: 26 October 2014.
Source: NB1

=== Results by round ===
Round	1	2	3	4	5	6	7	8	9	10	11	12	13	14	15	16	17	18	19	20	21	22	23	24	25	26	27	28	29	30
Ground	A	H	A	H	A	H	A	H	A	H	A	H																		
Result	W	D	D	W	D	D	L	W	D	W	D	W																		
Position	7	5	7	6	6	6	7	6	6	5	6	5																		

Updated to match(es) played on 26 October 2014. Source: Matches
A = Away; H = Home; W = Win; D = Draw; L = Loss

== Hungarian Cup ==
13 August 2014 Round 1	Budaörs	1 – 3	Újpest	Budaörs, Pest County
17:00 CEST	Laczkovich 58'	Report	M'Boma 24'; Serwy 27'; Stanisavljević 45'	Stadium: Árok Street Stadium; Attendance: 750; Referee: (Hungary) Zoltán J. Kovács

9 September 2014 Round 2	Himesháza	0 – 13	Újpest	Himesháza, Baranya County
15:30 CEST		Report	Ojo 11', 27'; Simon 13', 20', 54'; Bardhi 37', 39', 80'; Suljić 70', 87'; Nego 72'; Ponce 84', 89'	Stadium: Himesháza KSE Sporttelep; Attendance: 1,353; Referee: (Hungary) István Mód

24 September 2014 Round 3	Újpest	2 – 0	Haladás	Budapest, Pest County
17:00 CEST	Vasiljević 22', 78'	Report		Stadium: Szusza Ferenc Stadium; Attendance: 700; Referee: (Hungary) István Vad

== League Cup ==
3 September 2014 1	Újpest	2 – 1	Vasas	Budapest, Pest County
17:00 CEST	M'Boma 43'; Tsveiba 90'	Report	Takács 88'	Stadium: Szusza Ferenc Stadium; Attendance: 800; Referee: (Hungary) Ferenc Karakó

17 September 2014 2	Ajka	2 – 2	Újpest	Ajka, Veszprém County
16:00 CEST	Szabó 31'; Mihalecz 63'	Report	Ponce 36', 56'	Stadium: Stadion Városi; Attendance: 400; Referee: (Hungary) Gábor Barna

7 October 2014 3	Videoton	3 – 1	Újpest	Székesfehérvár, Fejér County
18:00 CEST	Feczesin 15' (pen.), 73' (pen.); Alvarez 45'	Report	Stanisavljević 58'	Stadium: Sóstói Stadion; Attendance: 1,000; Referee: (Hungary) Gábor Oláh

15 October 2014 4	Újpest	1 – 0	Videoton	Budapest, Pest County
18:00 CEST	Tsveiba 90+2'	Report		Stadium: Szusza Ferenc Stadium; Attendance: 300; Referee: (Hungary) Balázs Berke

Pos	Team	Pld	W	D	L	GF	GA	GD	Pts	Qualification	VID	ÚJP	VAS	AJK
1	Videoton	6	4	1	1	18	5	+13	13	Advance to knockout phase	—	3–1	5–1	4–0
2	Újpest	6	4	1	1	14	8	+6	13	Advance to knockout phase	1–0	—	2–1	4–1
3	Vasas	6	2	1	3	10	13	−3	7		1–1	1–4	—	2–1
4	Ajka	6	0	1	5	5	21	−16	1		1–5	2–2	0–4	—

Source: Soccerway
Legend: Blue = home team win; Yellow = draw; Red = away team win.
