= 2013–14 Újpest FC season =

Újpest FC
2013–14 season
- Chairman: (Belgium) Roderick Duchâtelet
- Manager: (Belgium) Marc Lelièvre (until 23 October 2013) (Serbia) Nebojša Vignjević
- NB 1: 13th
- Hungarian Cup: Winners
- Hungarian League Cup: Group stage
- Top goalscorer: League: Dušan Vasiljević (8 goals); All: Dušan Vasiljević (14 goals)
- Highest home attendance: 22,000 vs Diósgyőr (25 May 2014)
- Lowest home attendance: 100 vs Békéscsaba (13 November 2013)
Home colours	Away colours

The 2013–14 season was Újpest Football Club's 108th competitive season, 102nd consecutive season in the OTP Bank Liga and 128th year in existence as a football club.

== First team squad ==
Note: Flags indicate national team as defined under FIFA eligibility rules; some limited exceptions apply. Players may hold more than one non-FIFA nationality.

No.	Pos.	Nation	Player
1	GK	HUN	Szabolcs Balajcza
3	MF	BEL	Jonathan Heris
4	MF	SRB	Filip Stanisavljević
5	DF	ESP	Juanan
6	MF	SRB	Dušan Vasiljević
7	MF	HUN	Krisztián Simon
10	MF	MNE	Nebojša Kosović (loan from Standard Liège)
11	FW	EST	Jarmo Ahjupera
15	MF	BEL	Nikolas Proesmans
16	FW	HUN	Bence Lázár
17	DF	ESP	Chema Antón
18	MF	MNE	Bojan Sanković
19	MF	HUN	Balázs Balogh

No.	Pos.	Nation	Player
22	FW	HUN	Péter Kabát
24	DF	BEL	Simon Ligot (loan from Standard Liège)
25	FW	SEN	Badiane Sidibe
26	FW	HUN	Balázs Zamostny
27	DF	HUN	Sándor Molnár
28	DF	HUN	János Nagy
29	MF	HUN	Róbert Litauszki
32	FW	COD	Bavon Tshibuabua
34	DF	SEN	Lansana Sagna
35	DF	BIH	Bojan Mihajlović
36	GK	SRB	Marko Dmitrović
55	DF	BEL	Pierre-Yves Ngawa (loan from Standard Liège)
99	MF	BIH	Asmir Suljić

== Transfers ==
=== Summer ===
In: Note: Flags indicate national team as defined under FIFA eligibility rules; some limited exceptions apply. Players may hold more than one non-FIFA nationality.

No.	Pos.	Nation	Player
2	DF	FRA	Loïc Nego (from (Italy) Roma)
2	DF	HUN	János Nagy (from Újpest II)
5	DF	ESP	Juanan (from (Germany) Fortuna Düsseldorf)
10	MF	HUN	Dávid Barczi (loan return from (Belgium) St. Truidense)
11	FW	EST	Jarmo Ahjupera (from Győr)
13	MF	KEN	Hisham Said (from Újpest II)
14	MF	HUN	Rajmond Toricska (from Újpest II)
18	MF	MNE	Bojan Sanković (from (Montenegro) Mladost)
24	DF	BEL	Simon Ligot (loan from Standard Liège)
27	DF	HUN	Sándor Molnár (from Újpest II)
28	DF	HUN	Ronald Erős (from Újpest II)
32	MF	HUN	Tamás Egerszegi (loan return from (Belgium) St. Truidense)
36	GK	SRB	Marko Dmitrović (from (Serbia) Crvena Zvezda)
55	DF	BEL	Pierre-Yves Ngawa (loan from (Belgium) Standard Liège)
99	MF	BIH	Asmir Suljić (from (Bosnia and Herzegovina) Sarajevo)

Out: Note: Flags indicate national team as defined under FIFA eligibility rules; some limited exceptions apply. Players may hold more than one non-FIFA nationality.

No.	Pos.	Nation	Player
2	DF	HUN	Marcell Fodor (loan to Ajka)
2	DF	HUN	János Nagy (loan to Szigetszentmiklós)
5	DF	ITA	Alessandro Iandoli (loan return to (Belgium) St. Truiden)
10	MF	HUN	Dávid Barczi (to Diósgyőr)
21	MF	HUN	Mohamed Remili (to Vasas)
24	DF	HUN	Zoltán Pollák (to Szigetszentmiklós)
26	DF	HUN	Zsolt Szokol (to Nyíregyháza)
27	MF	HUN	Dániel Kovács (to Gyirmót)
32	MF	HUN	Tamás Egerszegi (loan to Gyirmót)
34	DF	BEL	Naïm Aarab (loan to (Belgium) St. Truiden)
36	GK	HUN	Tamás Horváth (to Mezőkövesd)
40	GK	HUN	Tamás Floszmann

=== Winter ===
In: Note: Flags indicate national team as defined under FIFA eligibility rules; some limited exceptions apply. Players may hold more than one non-FIFA nationality.

No.	Pos.	Nation	Player
2	DF	COL	Darwin Andrade (loan from (Belgium) St. Truiden)
3	MF	BEL	Jonathan Heris (from (Belgium) Tubize)
9	FW	COD	Jean-Marc Makusu (loan from (Belgium) Standard Liège)
10	MF	MNE	Nebojša Kosović (loan from (Belgium) Standard Liège)
26	FW	HUN	Balázs Zamostny (loan return from Vasas)
28	DF	HUN	János Nagy (loan return from Szigetszentmiklós)
32	MF	HUN	Tamás Egerszegi (loan return from Gyirmót)

Out: Note: Flags indicate national team as defined under FIFA eligibility rules; some limited exceptions apply. Players may hold more than one non-FIFA nationality.

No.	Pos.	Nation	Player
2	DF	FRA	Loïc Nego (to (England) Charlton Athletic)
3	DF	HUN	Krisztián Vermes (to Mezőkövesd)
14	MF	HUN	Rajmond Toricska (loan to Kozármisleny)
18	MF	FRA	Grégory Christ (to (Belgium) White Star)
20	MF	TOG	Henri Eninful (loan to Kecskemét)
25	FW	HUN	Richárd Horváth (to Pápa)
28	DF	HUN	Ronald Erős (to Cegléd)
32	MF	HUN	Tamás Egerszegi (to Diósgyőri VTK)

- List of Hungarian football transfers summer 2013
- List of Hungarian football transfers winter 2013–14

== Statistics ==
=== Appearances and goals ===
Last updated on 1 June 2014.

No.	Pos	Nat	Player	Total		OTP Bank Liga		Hungarian Cup		League Cup	
No.	Pos	Nat	Player	Apps	Goals	Apps	Goals	Apps	Goals	Apps	Goals
1	GK	(Hungary) HUN	Szabolcs Balajcza	26	-36	18	-32	7	-2	1	-2
3	MF	(Belgium) BEL	Jonathan Heris	15	0	10	0	5	0	0	0
4	MF	(Serbia) SRB	Filip Stanisavljević	27	5	16	3	5	0	6	2
5	DF	(Spain) ESP	Juanan	28	3	19	1	6	1	3	1
6	MF	(Serbia) SRB	Dušan Vasiljević	40	14	29	8	7	4	4	2
7	MF	(Hungary) HUN	Krisztián Simon	38	9	26	7	7	1	5	1
10	MF	(Montenegro) MNE	Nebojša Kosović	12	1	8	1	4	0	0	0
11	FW	(Estonia) EST	Jarmo Ahjupera	7	3	6	3	0	0	1	0
15	MF	(Belgium) BEL	Nikolas Proesmans	12	0	9	0	3	0	0	0
16	FW	(Hungary) HUN	Bence Lázár	26	8	19	4	4	4	3	0
17	DF	(Spain) ESP	Chema Antón	24	0	18	0	2	0	4	0
18	MF	(Montenegro) MNE	Bojan Sanković	26	1	17	0	5	1	4	0
19	MF	(Hungary) HUN	Balázs Balogh	43	3	30	1	8	2	5	0
22	FW	(Hungary) HUN	Péter Kabát	29	8	24	6	4	1	1	1
24	DF	(Belgium) BEL	Simon Ligot	13	0	12	0	0	0	1	0
25	FW	(Senegal) SEN	Badiane Sidibe	3	0	3	0	0	0	0	0
26	FW	(Hungary) HUN	Balázs Zamostny	11	2	7	0	4	2	0	0
27	DF	(Hungary) HUN	Sándor Molnár	2	0	2	0	0	0	0	0
28	DF	(Hungary) HUN	János Nagy	14	0	10	0	4	0	0	0
29	DF	(Hungary) HUN	Róbert Litauszki	34	3	21	2	7	1	6	0
32	FW	(Democratic Republic of the Congo) COD	Bavon Tshibuabua	36	5	26	5	8	0	2	0
34	DF	(Senegal) SEN	Lansana Sagna	1	0	1	0	0	0	0	0
35	DF	(Bosnia and Herzegovina) BIH	Bojan Mihajlović	5	0	5	0	0	0	0	0
36	GK	(Serbia) SRB	Marko Dmitrović	13	-19	12	-19	1	0	0	0
55	DF	(Belgium) BEL	Pierre-Yves Ngawa	30	0	20	0	8	0	2	0
99	MF	(Bosnia and Herzegovina) BIH	Asmir Suljić	29	2	19	1	5	1	5	0
Youth players:
8	DF	(Hungary) HUN	Zoltán Szélesi	1	0	0	0	1	0	0	0
13	MF	(Kenya) KEN	Hisham Said	5	1	0	0	1	0	4	1
14	MF	(Hungary) HUN	János Tóth	1	0	0	0	0	0	1	0
15	DF	(Hungary) HUN	Dávid Jónás	1	0	0	0	0	0	1	0
15	MF	(Hungary) HUN	Róbert Hammer	1	0	0	0	0	0	1	0
21	GK	(Hungary) HUN	Levente Bősz	3	-5	0	0	0	0	3	-5
23	GK	(Hungary) HUN	Dávid Banai	2	-2	0	0	0	0	2	-2
27	FW	(Hungary) HUN	Erik Ádám	1	0	0	0	0	0	1	0
27	DF	(Hungary) HUN	Ádám Baranyai	1	0	0	0	0	0	1	0
Out to loan:
14	MF	(Hungary) HUN	Rajmond Toricska	2	0	1	0	0	0	1	0
20	MF	(Togo) TOG	Henri Eninful	11	0	6	0	2	0	3	0
Players no longer at the club:
2	DF	(France) FRA	Loïc Nego	9	1	4	1	2	0	3	0
3	DF	(Hungary) HUN	Krisztián Vermes	9	0	6	0	0	0	3	0
25	FW	(Hungary) HUN	Richárd Horváth	7	1	2	0	0	0	5	1
28	DF	(Hungary) HUN	Ronald Erős	3	0	0	0	1	0	2	0

=== Top scorers ===
Includes all competitive matches. The list is sorted by shirt number when total goals are equal.

Last updated on 1 June 2014

Position	Nation	Number	Name	OTP Bank Liga	Hungarian Cup	League Cup	Total
1	(Serbia)	6	Dušan Vasiljević	8	4	2	14
2	(Hungary)	7	Krisztián Simon	7	1	1	9
3	(Hungary)	22	Péter Kabát	6	1	1	8
4	(Hungary)	16	Bence Lázár	4	4	0	8
5	(Democratic Republic of the Congo)	32	Bavon Tshibuabua	5	0	0	5
6	(Serbia)	4	Filip Stanisavljević	3	0	2	5
7	(Estonia)	11	Jarmo Ahjupera	3	0	0	3
8	(Hungary)	29	Róbert Litauszki	2	1	0	3
9	(Hungary)	19	Balázs Balogh	1	2	0	3
10	(Spain)	5	Juanan	1	1	1	3
11	(Bosnia and Herzegovina)	99	Asmir Suljić	1	1	0	2
12	(Hungary)	26	Balázs Zamostny	0	2	0	2
13	(France)	2	Loïc Nego	1	0	0	1
14	(Montenegro)	10	Nebojša Kosović	1	0	0	1
15	(Montenegro)	18	Bojan Sanković	0	1	0	1
16	(Hungary)	25	Richárd Horváth	0	0	1	1
17	(Kenya)	13	Hisham Said	0	0	1	1
/	/	/	Own Goals	3	0	0	3
			TOTALS	46	18	9	73

=== Disciplinary record ===
Includes all competitive matches. Players with 1 card or more included only.

Last updated on 1 June 2014

Position	Nation	Number	Name	OTP Bank Liga		Hungarian Cup		League Cup		Total (Hu Total)	
Position	Nation	Number	Name	Booked	Sent off (straight red)	Booked	Sent off (straight red)	Booked	Sent off (straight red)	Booked	Sent off (straight red)
DF	(France)	2	Loïc Nego	1	1	0	0	1	0	2 (1)	1 (1)
DF	(Hungary)	3	Krisztián Vermes	1	0	0	0	0	0	1 (1)	0 (0)
MF	(Belgium)	3	Jonathan Heris	3	1	0	0	0	0	3 (3)	1 (1)
MF	(Serbia)	4	Filip Stanisavljević	2	0	0	0	1	0	3 (2)	0 (0)
DF	(Spain)	5	Juanan	2	0	1	0	1	0	4 (2)	0 (0)
MF	(Serbia)	6	Dušan Vasiljević	3	1	3	0	2	0	8 (3)	1 (1)
MF	(Hungary)	7	Krisztián Simon	1	0	2	0	0	0	3 (1)	0 (0)
MF	(Montenegro)	10	Nebojša Kosović	1	0	0	0	0	0	1 (1)	0 (0)
FW	(Estonia)	11	Jarmo Ahjupera	0	1	0	0	0	0	0 (0)	1 (1)
MF	(Kenya)	13	Hisham Said	0	0	1	0	0	0	1 (0)	0 (0)
MF	(Belgium)	15	Nikolas Proesmans	1	0	0	0	0	0	1 (1)	0 (0)
MF	(Hungary)	15	Róbert Hammer	0	0	0	0	1	0	1 (0)	0 (0)
FW	(Hungary)	16	Bence Lázár	0	0	0	0	1	0	1 (0)	0 (0)
DF	(Spain)	17	Chema Antón	3	0	1	0	0	0	4 (3)	0 (0)
MF	(Montenegro)	18	Bojan Sanković	3	0	2	0	1	0	6 (3)	0 (0)
MF	(Hungary)	19	Balázs Balogh	2	0	1	0	0	0	3 (2)	0 (0)
MF	(Togo)	20	Henri Eninful	1	0	0	0	0	1	1 (0)	1 (1)
GK	(Hungary)	21	Levente Bősz	0	0	0	0	1	0	1 (0)	0 (0)
FW	(Hungary)	22	Péter Kabát	4	0	4	0	0	0	8 (4)	0 (0)
DF	(Belgium)	24	Simon Ligot	2	0	0	0	0	0	2 (2)	0 (0)
FW	(Hungary)	25	Richárd Horváth	0	0	0	0	1	0	1 (0)	0 (0)
DF	(Hungary)	28	János Nagy	1	0	1	0	0	0	2 (1)	0 (0)
DF	(Hungary)	29	Róbert Litauszki	7	0	0	0	1	0	8 (7)	0 (0)
FW	(Democratic Republic of the Congo)	32	Bavon Tshibuabua	4	0	1	0	0	0	5 (4)	0 (0)
DF	(Bosnia and Herzegovina)	35	Bojan Mihajlović	1	0	0	0	0	0	1 (1)	0 (0)
GK	(Serbia)	36	Marko Dmitrović	0	0	1	0	0	0	1 (0)	0 (0)
DF	(Belgium)	55	Pierre-Yves Ngawa	5	2	0	0	0	0	5 (5)	2 (2)
MF	(Bosnia and Herzegovina)	99	Asmir Suljić	3	1	2	0	2	0	7 (3)	1 (1)
			TOTALS	51	7	20	0	13	1	84 (51)	8 (7)

=== Overall ===
Games played	44 (30 OTP Bank Liga, 8 Hungarian Cup and 6 Hungarian League Cup)
Games won	14 (8 OTP Bank Liga, 5 Hungarian Cup and 1 Hungarian League Cup)
Games drawn	14 (8 OTP Bank Liga, 3 Hungarian Cup and 3 Hungarian League Cup)
Games lost	16 (14 OTP Bank Liga, 0 Hungarian Cup and 2 Hungarian League Cup)
Goals scored	72
Goals conceded	62
Goal difference	+10
Yellow cards	84
Red cards	8
Worst discipline	(Serbia) Dušan Vasiljević (8 (yellow card) , 1 (red card) )
Best result	6–0 (A) v Baja – Magyar Kupa – 30-10-2013
Worst result	0–4 (H) v MTK Budapest – OTP Bank Liga – 03-04-2014
Most appearances	(Hungary) Balázs Balogh (43 appearances)
Top scorer	(Serbia) Dušan Vasiljević (14 goals)
Points	55/132 (41.67%)

Last updated: 1 June 2014

== Nemzeti Bajnokság I ==
=== Matches ===
27 July 2013 1	Újpest	1–2	Paks	Budapest, Pest County
16:30 CEST	Kabát 42' (pen.)	(Report)	Báló 60'; Simon 90+3' (pen.)	Stadium: Szusza Ferenc Stadium; Attendance: 1,613; Referee: (Hungary) Ádám Németh

3 August 2013 2	Puskás	1–2	Újpest	Székesfehérvár, Fejér County
21:00 CEST	Tischler 17'	(Report)	Kabát 23'; Ahjupera 61'	Stadium: Sóstói Stadion; Attendance: 600; Referee: (Hungary) Ádám Farkas

11 August 2013 3	Újpest	1–1	Honvéd	Budapest, Pest County
20:30 CEST	Simon 20'	(Report)	Vernes 48' (pen.)	Stadium: Szusza Ferenc Stadium; Attendance: 2,467; Referee: (Hungary) István Vad

16 August 2013 4	Kaposvár	2–2	Újpest	Kaposvár, Somogy County
19:00 CEST	Petrache 68'; Thian 81'	(Report)	Vasiljević 44' (pen.); Lázár 87'	Stadium: Stadion Kaposvár Rákóczi; Attendance: 2,500; Referee: (Hungary) Zsolt Szabó

24 August 2013 5	Újpest	6–1	Mezőkövesd	Budapest, Pest County
21:00 CEST	Simon 31', 50'; Ahjupera 45', 64'; Tshibuabua 82'; Kabát 90'	(Report)	Menougong 15'	Stadium: Szusza Ferenc Stadium; Attendance: 1,985; Referee: (Hungary) Péter Solymosi

31 August 2013 6	Diósgyőr	2–0	Újpest	Miskolc, Borsod-Abaúj-Zemplén County
21:00 CEST	Kostić 36'; Kádár 51'	(Report)		Stadium: DVTK Stadion; Attendance: 4,569; Referee: (Hungary) Ádám Németh

14 September 2013 7	Újpest	1–1	Szombathely	Budapest, Pest County
14:00 CEST	Vasiljević 59'	(Report)	Fehér 82'	Stadium: Szusza Ferenc Stadium; Attendance: 2,117; Referee: (Hungary) József Erdős

22 September 2013 8	Ferencváros	3–1	Újpest	Budapest, Pest County
16:30 CEST	Diallo 25'; Juanan 47' (o.g.); Böde 77'	(Report)	Tshibuabua 4'	Stadium: Ferenc Puskás Stadium; Attendance: 22,094; Referee: (Hungary) Zsolt Szabó

29 September 2013 9	Újpest	1–1	Pécs	Budapest, Pest County
18:30 CEST	Simon 45'	(Report)	Grumić 12'	Stadium: Szusza Ferenc Stadium; Attendance: 1,847; Referee: (Hungary) Tamás Bognár

6 October 2013 10	Videoton	3–0	Újpest	Székesfehérvár, Fejér County
18:30 CEST	Zé Luís 48', 66'; Kleinheisler 53'	(Report)		Stadium: Sóstói Stadion; Attendance: 3,420; Referee: (Hungary) Viktor Kassai

20 October 2013 11	Újpest	1–2	Győr	Budapest, Pest County
16:30 CEST	Kabát 36'	(Report)	Pátkai 10'; Lipták 15'	Stadium: Szusza Ferenc Stadium; Attendance: 1,964; Referee: (Hungary) Ádám Farkas

25 October 2013 12	MTK	0–1	Újpest	Budapest, Pest County
19:00 CEST		(Report)	Juanan 23'	Stadium: Hidegkuti Nándor Stadium; Attendance: 1,500; Referee: (Hungary) Sándor Andó-Szabó

3 November 2013 13	Újpest	1–4	Debrecen	Budapest, Pest County
16:30 CET	Simon 62'	(Report)	Kulcsár 7'; Sidibe 10', 76'; Bouadla 12'	Stadium: Szusza Ferenc Stadium; Attendance: 2,811; Referee: (Hungary) István Vad

10 November 2013 14	Kecskemét	1–1	Újpest	Kecskemét, Bács-Kiskun County
18:30 CET	Balázs 9'	(Report)	Vukasović 3' (o.g.)	Stadium: Széktói Stadion; Attendance: 1,852; Referee: (Hungary) Tamás Bognár

23 November 2013 15	Újpest	4–2	Pápa	Budapest, Pest County
18:00 CET	Litauszki 3'; Simon 28'; Stanisavljević 43', 50'	(Report)	Kenesei 7'; Présinger 31'	Stadium: Szusza Ferenc Stadium; Attendance: 1,338; Referee: (Hungary) Dániel Becséri

30 November 2013 16	Paks	2–4	Újpest	Paks, Tolna County
16:00 CET	Könyves 9'; Bartha 32'	(Report)	Tshibuabua 22'; Nego 56'; Vasiljević 60'; Lázár 65'	Stadium: Stadion PSE; Attendance: 1,500; Referee: (Hungary) Péter Solymosi

7 December 2013 17	Újpest	3–3	Puskás	Budapest, Pest County
14:00 CET	Lázár 60'; Litauszki 79'; Simon 88'	(Report)	Margitics 31'; Szekeres 63'; Lencse 67' (pen.)	Stadium: Szusza Ferenc Stadium; Attendance: 1,230; Referee: (Hungary) Péter Solymosi

1 March 2014 18	Honvéd	3–2	Újpest	Budapest, Pest County
14:00 CET	Živanović 13'; Daud 65' (pen.); Vécsei 81'	(Report)	Vasiljević 44'; Kosović 86'	Stadium: Bozsik Stadion; Attendance: 2,500; Referee: (Hungary) Viktor Kassai

8 March 2014 19	Újpest	1–1	Kaposvár	Budapest, Pest County
18:00 CET	Lázár 20'	(Report)	Kink 27'	Stadium: Szusza Ferenc Stadium; Attendance: 2,311; Referee: (Hungary) Zoltán Iványi

16 March 2014 20	Mezőkövesd	0–1	Újpest	Mezőkövesd, Borsod-Abaúj-Zemplén County
14:30 CET		(Report)	Balogh 89'	Stadium: Mezőkövesdi Városi Stadion; Attendance: 2,500; Referee: (Hungary) Sándor Andó-Szabó

23 March 2014 21	Újpest	2–0	Diósgyőr	Budapest, Pest County
16:30 CET	Tshibuabua 8'; Kabát 19' (pen.)	(Report)		Stadium: Szusza Ferenc Stadium; Attendance: 4,813; Referee: (Hungary) István Vad

30 March 2014 22	Haladás	1–0	Újpest	Szombathely, Vas County
18:30 CEST	Radó 45'	(Report)		Stadium: Rohonci Street Stadium; Attendance: 3,723; Referee: (Hungary) Sándor Andó-Szabó

4 April 2014 23	Újpest	1–2	Ferencváros	Budapest, Pest County
19:00 CEST	Vasiljević 4'	(Report)	Gyömbér 23'; Leonardo 88'	Stadium: Szusza Ferenc Stadium; Attendance: 9,517; Referee: (Hungary) Ádám Farkas

11 April 2014 24	Pécs	0–0	Újpest	Pécs, Baranya County
19:00 CEST		(Report)		Stadium: Stadion PMFC; Attendance: 1,600; Referee: (Hungary) Zoltán Iványi

19 April 2014 25	Újpest	1–2	Videoton	Budapest, Pest County
18:00 CEST	Kabát 81'	(Report)	Zé Luís 58', 60'	Stadium: Szusza Ferenc Stadium; Attendance: 2,194; Referee: (Hungary) József Erdős

27 April 2014 26	Győr	1–0	Újpest	Győr, Győr-Moson-Sopron County
16:30 CEST	Andrić 64'	(Report)		Stadium: ETO Park; Attendance: 5,000; Referee: (Hungary) István Vad

3 May 2014 27	Újpest	0–4	MTK	Budapest, Pest County
16:00 CEST		(Report)	Nagy 6' (o.g.); Vass 56'; Kanta 77' (pen.); Torghelle 87'	Stadium: Szusza Ferenc Stadium; Attendance: 1,601; Referee: (Hungary) Sándor Andó-Szabó

10 May 2014 28	Debrecen	3–1	Újpest	Debrecen, Hajdú-Bihar County
20:00 CEST	Kulcsár 27'; Antón 46' (o.g.); Vadnai 85'	(Report)	Vasiljević 37'	Stadium: Nagyerdei Stadion; Attendance: 20,000; Referee: (Hungary) József Erdős

17 May 2014 29	Újpest	6–1	Kecskemét	Budapest, Pest County
18:00 CEST	Stanisavljević 14'; Gyagya 48' (o.g.); Vasiljević 55' (pen.), 64' (pen.); Tshibuabua 71'; Vukasović 90' (o.g.)	(Report)	Savić 38' (pen.)	Stadium: Szusza Ferenc Stadium; Attendance: 1,375; Referee: (Hungary) Viktor Kassai

31 May 2014 30	Pápa	2–1	Újpest	Pápa, Veszprém County
16:00 CEST	Csizmadia 84'; Kenesei 87'	(Report)	Suljić 17'	Stadium: Stadion Várkerti; Attendance: 1,200; Referee: (Hungary) Zsolt Szabó

=== Classification ===
Pos	Team	Pld	W	D	L	GF	GA	GD	Pts	Qualification or relegation
11	Paks	30	8	10	12	39	42	−3	34	
12	Pápa	30	9	6	15	32	50	−18	33	
13	Újpest	30	8	8	14	46	51	−5	32	
14	Puskás Akadémia	30	8	7	15	36	51	−15	31	
15	Mezőkövesd (R)	30	6	6	18	27	52	−25	24	Relegation to Nemzeti Bajnokság II

Source: mlsz.hu (in Hungarian)
Rules for classification: 1st points; 2nd overall wins; 3rd goal difference; 4th head-to-head points; 5th head-to-head goal difference; 6th head-to-head away goals scored; 7th fair-play points; 8th drawing of lots
(R) Relegated

=== Results summary ===
Overall								Home						Away					
Pld	W	D	L	GF	GA	GD	Pts	W	D	L	GF	GA	GD	W	D	L	GF	GA	GD
30	8	8	14	46	51	−5	32	4	5	6	30	27	+3	4	3	8	16	24	−8

Last updated: 1 June 2014.
Source: NB1

=== Results by round ===
Round	1	2	3	4	5	6	7	8	9	10	11	12	13	14	15	16	17	18	19	20	21	22	23	24	25	26	27	28	29	30
Ground	H	A	H	A	H	A	H	A	H	A	H	A	H	A	H	A	H	A	H	A	H	A	H	A	H	A	H	A	H	A
Result	L	W	D	D	W	L	D	L	D	L	L	W	L	D	W	W	D	L	D	W	W	L	L	D	L	L	L	L	W	L
Position	12	7	8	7	6	9	11	11	13	14	15	12	12	12	10	10	10	11	11	10	9	9	11	11	11	11	12	13	12	13

Updated to match(es) played on 1 June 2014. Source: Matches
A = Away; H = Home; W = Win; D = Draw; L = Loss

== Hungarian Cup ==
30 October 2013 Round of 32	Baja	0–6	Újpest	Baja, Bács-Kiskun County
12:30 CET		(Report)	Simon 2'; Sanković 25'; Lázár 41', 56', 61', 72'	Stadium: Bajai Sporttelep; Attendance: 400; Referee: (Hungary) Zoltán J. Kovács

27 November 2013 Round of 16 (1st leg)	Ferencváros	0–0	Újpest	Budapest, Pest County
18:00 CET		(Report)		Stadium: Stadium Puskás Ferenc; Attendance: 8,845; Referee: (Hungary) Zoltán Iványi

4 December 2013 Round of 16 (2nd leg)	Újpest	1–0 (1–0 agg.)	Ferencváros	Budapest, Pest County
18:00 CET	Vasiljević 72'	Report		Stadium: Szusza Ferenc Stadium; Attendance: 5,850; Referee: (Hungary) Viktor Kassai

12 March 2014 Quarter-final (1st leg)	Pécs	1–3	Újpest	Pécs, Baranya County
18:00 CET	Pölöskey 85'	(Report)	Vasiljević 63', 72' (pen.), 80'	Stadium: Stadion PMFC; Attendance: 1,800; Referee: (Hungary) Mihály Fábián

26 March 2014 Quarter-final (2nd leg)	Újpest	4–0 (7–1 agg.)	Pécs	Budapest, Pest County
18:00 CET	Balogh 30'; Zamostny 34', 48'; Suljić 54'	Report		Stadium: Szusza Ferenc Stadium; Attendance: 2,016; Referee: (Hungary) Péter Solymosi

16 April 2014 Semi-final (1st leg)	MTK	0–0	Újpest	Budapest, Pest County
18:00 CEST		(Report)		Stadium: Hidegkuti Nándor Stadium; Attendance: 1,500; Referee: (Hungary) Péter Solymosi

6 May 2014 Semi-final (2nd leg)	Újpest	3–0 (3–0 agg.)	MTK	Budapest, Pest County
18:00 CEST	Juanan 57'; Balogh 79'; Kabát 84'	Report		Stadium: Szusza Ferenc Stadium; Attendance: 1,797; Referee: (Hungary) Ádám Farkas

25 May 2014 Final	Újpest	1–1 (a.e.t.) (4–3 p)	Diósgyőr	Budapest, Pest County
19:00 CEST	Litauszki 6'	(Report)	Bacsa 90+1'	Stadium: Ferenc Puskás Stadium; Attendance: 22,000; Referee: (Hungary) Péter Solymosi
	Penalties
	Vasiljević (penalty scored); Litauszki (penalty scored); Tshibuabua (penalty scored); Simon (penalty scored)		Kostić (penalty scored); Bacsa (penalty scored); Alves (penalty missed); Barczi (penalty scored); Husić (penalty missed)

== League Cup ==
=== Group stage ===
4 September 2013 1	Újpest	2–0	Szolnok	Budapest, Pest County
19:00 CEST	Juanan 50'; Stanisavljević 78'	(Report)		Stadium: Szusza Ferenc Stadium; Attendance: 300; Referee: (Hungary) László Lovas

11 September 2013 2	Kecskemét	2–1	Újpest	Kecskemét, Bács-Kiskun County
18:00 CEST	Pekár 47'; Nagy 64'	(Report)	Simon 49'	Stadium: Széktói Stadion; Attendance: 200; Referee: (Hungary) János Takács

9 October 2013 3	Békéscsaba	1–1	Újpest	Békéscsaba, Békés County
15:00 CEST	Pantović 58' (pen.)	(Report)	Stanisavljević 60'	Stadium: Stadion Kórház utcai Attendance: 300; Referee: (Hungary) János Takács

16 October 2013 4	Újpest	2–2	Békéscsaba	Budapest, Pest County
18:00 CEST	Vasiljević 34'; Kabát 87'	(Report)	Tölgyesi 72'; Pantović 84'	Stadium: Szusza Ferenc Stadium; Attendance: 100; Referee: (Hungary) Zoltán J. Kovács

13 November 2013 5	Újpest	1–2	Kecskemét	Budapest, Pest County
18:00 CET	Horváth 37'	(Report)	Pekár 5', 84' (pen.)	Stadium: Szusza Ferenc Stadium; Attendance: 200; Referee: (Hungary) László Varga

20 November 2013 6	Szolnok	2–2	Újpest	Szolnok, Jász-Nagykun-Szolnok County
15:00 CET	Máté 4' (pen.), 90+3' (pen.)	(Report)	Said 23'; Vasiljević 33'	Stadium: Tiszaligeti Stadion; Attendance: 200; Referee: (Hungary) Eszter Urbán

==== Classification ====
Pos	Team	Pld	W	D	L	GF	GA	GD	Pts	Qualification
1	Szolnok	6	3	1	2	15	10	+5	10	Advance to knockout phase
2	Kecskemét	6	3	1	2	13	14	−1	10	Advance to knockout phase
3	Újpest	6	1	3	2	9	9	0	6	
4	Békéscsaba	6	1	3	2	8	12	−4	6	

Rules for classification: 1) points; 2) goal difference; 3) number of goals scored.

== Pre-season ==
10 July 2013 1	Sint-Truidense V.V. (Belgium)	1–1	(Hungary) Újpest	Sint-Truiden, Belgium
CEST	Vanwelkenhuysen 90+1'	(Report)	Vasiljević 26'	Stadium: Stayen; Attendance: 1,500

13 July 2013 2	K.S.C. Lokeren Oost-Vlaanderen (Belgium)	4–1	(Hungary) Újpest	Lokeren, Belgium
CEST	Vanaken 2'; Harbaoui 10', 60'; Overmeire 29'	(Report)	Ahjupera 34'	Stadium: Daknamstadion; Attendance: 500

16 July 2013 3	K.V. Mechelen (Belgium)	3–1	(Hungary) Újpest	Mechelen, Belgium
CEST	Enevoldsen 36'; Junker 44'; Mokulu 89'	(Report)	Bateau 7' (o.g.)	Stadium: Argosstadion Achter de Kazerne; Attendance: 2,000

20 July 2013 4	Vasas SC (Hungary)	0–4	(Hungary) Újpest	Budapest, Pest County
CEST		(Report)	Ahjupera 6'; Kabát 11'; Simon 28'; Tshibuabua 80'	Stadium: Stadion Rudolf Illovszky; Attendance: 1,500; Referee: (Hungary) Mihály Farkas
