= Loïc Négo =

Hungary international footballer (born 1991)

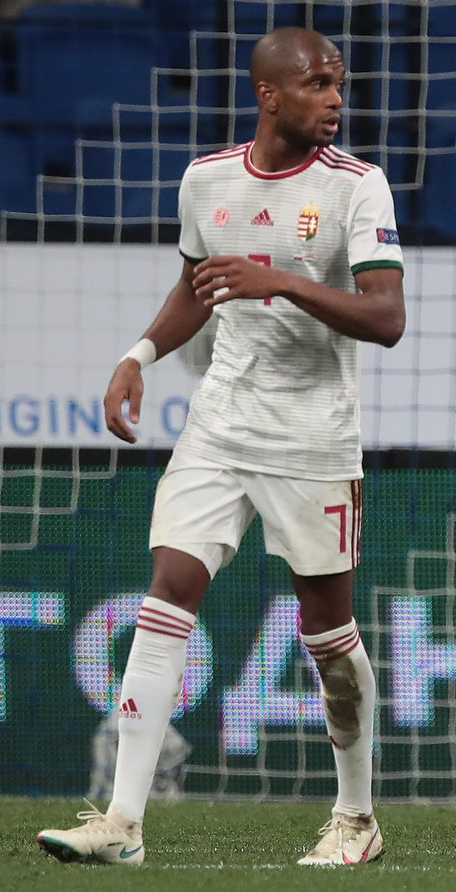
- Négo with Hungary in 2020

Personal information
- Date of birth: 15 January 1991 (age 35)
- Place of birth: Paris, France
- Height: 1.81 m (5 ft 11 in)
- Position: Right-back

Team information
- Current team: Omonia
- Number: 77

Youth career
- 2003–2004: Garges-les-Gonesse
- 2004–2005: Bourget
- 2005–2010: Nantes

Senior career*
Years	Team	Apps	(Gls)
2010–2011	Nantes	13	(0)
2011–2013	Roma	0	(0)
2013	→ Standard Liège (loan)	2	(0)
2013–2014	Újpest	4	(1)
2014–2015	Charlton Athletic	1	(0)
2014–2015	→ Újpest (loan)	23	(2)
2015–2023	Fehérvár	232	(31)
2023–2026	Le Havre	89	(0)
2026–	Omonia	1	(0)

International career^{‡}
2006–2007	France U16	7	(0)
2007–2008	France U17	17	(1)
2008–2009	France U18	8	(0)
2009–2010	France U19	12	(0)
2010–2011	France U20	15	(0)
2020–	Hungary	48	(2)
- * Club domestic league appearances and goals as of 22:10, 3 September 2026 (UTC) ‡ National team caps and goals as of 16:10, 16 November 2025 (UTC)

Loïc Négo (born 15 January 1991) is a professional footballer who plays as a right-back for Omonia. Born in France, he plays for the Hungary national team.

== Club career ==
On 18 June 2008, he signed his first professional contract agreeing to a three-year deal with FC Nantes until June 2011. Négo made his professional debut on 14 May 2010 in a league match against Caen appearing as a half-time substitute in a 3–1 defeat.

Négo joined Roma on a five-year contract following the conclusion of the 2011 FIFA U-20 World Cup.

=== Charlton Athletic ===
On 29 January 2014, Négo signed a three-and-a-half-year deal with Championship side Charlton Athletic for an undisclosed fee, ahead of their fixture against Wigan Athletic where he made his league debut for the club.

In August 2014, Négo rejoined Újpest on a season long loan deal.

=== Fehérvár ===
On 31 August 2015, Négo joined Fehérvár FC on a permanent deal. He won the 2017–18 Nemzeti Bajnokság I with Fehérvár. In the 2021–22 Nemzeti Bajnokság I he scored his first goal in a 1–1 draw with MTK Budapest FC at the Hidegkuti Nándor Stadion on 10 April 2022, while his second goal in a 3–0 victory against Debreceni VSC at the Nagyerdei Stadion on 30 April 2022. In the 2022–23 Nemzeti Bajnokság I he scored one goal against Kecskeméti TE on 31 August 2022.

=== Le Havre ===
On 23 June 2023, Négo was signed by Le Havre.

=== AC Omonia ===
On 9 July 2026, Négo was signed by Omonia.

== International career ==
=== France ===
Négo was born in metropolitan France and is of Guadeloupean descent. He is a French youth international and has represented his nation at all levels of youth for which he is eligible. Négo was a part of the team that won the 2010 UEFA European Under-19 Football Championship on home soil.

=== Hungary ===
In February 2019, while he does not speak Hungarian, Négo acquired Hungarian citizenship via naturalization. On 8 October 2020, he debuted for the Hungary national team against Bulgaria in the play-offs of Euro 2020. On 12 November 2020, he scored his first goal for Hungary against Iceland in the UEFA Euro 2020 qualifying play-offs at the Puskás Aréna. Just two minutes after his goal, Dominik Szoboszlai scored another one, enabling Hungary to take the lead and eventually win 2–1 against Iceland, qualifying for the UEFA Euro 2020.

On 1 June 2021, Négo was included in the final 26-man squad to represent Hungary at the rescheduled UEFA Euro 2020 tournament. In the team's opening match against Portugal, he came on as a 65th-minute substitute for András Schäfer. He went on to start the second game against his birth nation France and the third match against Germany.

On 14 May 2024, Négo was named in Hungary's squad for UEFA Euro 2024. He was an unused substitute in all three of the team's matches as Hungary finished third in Group A.

== Personal life ==
Négo, along with his teammates from Fehérvár, took part in a fundraising effort for Bendegúz Máté Horváth, aged 14, who was diagnosed with brain tumor.

In an interview regarding his decision to play for Hungary with Nemzeti Sport, Négo stated that France was "his home country, while Hungary was home".

The Hungarian football fans gave Négo the Hungarian nickname "Lajos", which approximates his first name, Loïc.

== Career statistics ==
=== Club ===
As of match played 31 August 2026

Appearances and goals by club, season and competition
Club	Season	League			National cup (Note: Includes Coupe de France, Magyar Kupa)		League cup (Note: Includes Ligakupa)		Europe		Total	
Club	Season	Division	Apps	Goals	Apps	Goals	Apps	Goals	Apps	Goals	Apps	Goals
Nantes	2009–10	Ligue 2	1	0	0	0	–		–		1	0
Nantes	2010–11	Ligue 2	12	0	4	1	–		–		16	1
Nantes	Total		13	0	4	1	–		–		17	1
Roma	2011–12	Serie A	0	0	0	0	–		0	0	0	0
Roma	2012–13	Serie A	0	0	0	0	–		–		0	0
Roma	Total		0	0	0	0	–		0	0	0	0
Standard Liège (loan)	2012–13	Belgian Pro League	2	0	0	0	–		–		2	0
Újpest	2013–14	NB I	4	1	2	0	3	0	–		9	1
Újpest	2014–15	NB I	23	2	7	1	7	0	–		37	3
Újpest	Total		27	3	9	1	10	0	–		46	4
Charlton Athletic	2013–14	Championship	1	0	0	0	0	0	–		1	0
Charlton Athletic	2014–15	Championship	0	0	0	0	0	0	–		0	0
Charlton Athletic	Total		1	0	0	0	0	0	–		1	0
Fehérvár	2015–16	NB I	26	6	3	0	–		–		29	6
Fehérvár	2016–17	NB I	32	2	3	0	–		5 (Note: Appearances in UEFA Europa League)	0	40	2
Fehérvár	2017–18	NB I	31	6	3	0	–		8	0	42	6
Fehérvár	2018–19	NB I	33	5	10	1	–		14 (Note: Eight appearances and two goals in UEFA Champions League, six appearances and one goal in UEFA Europa League)	3	57	9
Fehérvár	2019–20	NB I	26	3	7	0	–		4	3	37	6
Fehérvár	2020–21	NB I	28	6	5	0	–		4	0	37	6
Fehérvár	2021–22	NB I	30	2	4	1	–		2 (Note: Appearances in UEFA Conference League)	0	36	3
Fehérvár	2022–23	NB I	26	1	1	0	–		6	0	33	1
Fehérvár	Total		232	31	36	2	–		43	6	311	39
Le Havre	2023–24	Ligue 1	28	0	3	0	–		–		31	0
Le Havre	2024–25	Ligue 1	31	0	1	0	–		–		32	0
Le Havre	2025–26	Ligue 1	30	0	1	0	–		–		31	0
Le Havre	Total		89	0	5	0	–		–		94	0
Omonia	2026–27	Cypriot First Division	1	0	0	0	–		3 (Note: One appearance in UEFA Champions League, two appearances in UEFA Europa League)	0	4	0
Career total			365	34	54	4	10	0	46	6	475	44

=== International ===
As of match played 16 November 2025.

Appearances and goals by national team and year
National team	Year	Apps	Goals
Hungary	2020	6	1
Hungary	2021	12	1
Hungary	2022	8	0
Hungary	2023	7	0
Hungary	2024	6	0
Hungary	2025	9	0
Total		48	2

As of match played on 16 November 2025

Scores and results list Hungary's goal tally first, score column indicates score after each Négo goal.

List of international goals scored by Loïc Négo
No.	Date	Venue	Opponent	Cap	Score	Result	Competition
1	12 November 2020	Puskás Aréna, Budapest, Hungary	Iceland	4	1–1	2–1	UEFA Euro 2020 qualifying play-offs
2	31 March 2021	Estadi Nacional, Andorra la Vella, Andorra	Andorra	9	4–0	4–1	2022 FIFA World Cup qualification

== Honours ==
Újpest

- Magyar Kupa: 2013–14
- Szuperkupa: 2014

Fehérvár

- Nemzeti Bajnokság I: 2017–18
- Magyar Kupa: 2018–19; runner-up: 2020–21

France U19

- UEFA European Under-19 Football Championship: 2010
