= Casas del Señor =

Casas del Señor Cases del Senyor
- Municipality
- Casas del Señor
- Location in Spain
- Coordinates: 38°24′25″N 0°57′8″W
- Country: Spain
- Autonomous community: Valencian Community
- Province: Alicante
- Comarca: Vinalopó Mitjà
- Judicial district: Novelda

Population (2011)
  - Total: 253
- Time zone: UTC+1 (CET)
  - Summer (DST): UTC+2 (CEST)
- Postal code: 03649
- Official language(s): Valencian

Casas del Señor (in Valencian and co-official Cases del Senyor) is a village in the municipality of Monòver, in the region of the Vinalopó Medio (Alicante, Spain). It has a population of 279 inhabitants (2009).

Is located on the northern slope of the Sierra del Coto, surrounded by the mountain of Coto. It is remarkable the steeple of his parish (dedicated to Virgen María del Remedio), and the medieval aqueduct that saves the promenade and through the village, consisting of six arches of irregular measure is constructed in stone. Casas del Señor are several tiny villages and hamlets scattered across the surrounding countryside.

== Notable people ==
- José María Antón (born 19 March 1989), footballer
