= Rodrigo Rojo =

Uruguayan defender player (born 1989)

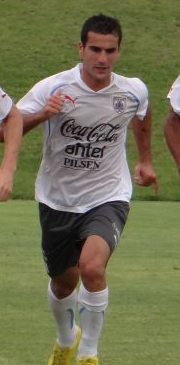

Personal information
- Full name: Rodrigo Rojo Piazze
- Date of birth: July 21, 1989 (age 37)
- Place of birth: Montevideo, Uruguay
- Height: 1.73 m (5 ft 8 in)
- Position: Left back

Youth career
- 2005–2008: River Plate
- 2008–2009: Rampla Juniors

Senior career*
Years	Team	Apps	(Gls)
2009–2012	Rampla Juniors	50	(1)
2012–2014	Fénix	50	(1)
2014–2015	Újpest	6	(0)
2015–2016	Fénix	7	(0)
2016	Sud América	12	(0)
2016–2017	Olimpia	2	(0)
2017–2018	Club Nacional	24	(0)
2018–2019	Peñarol	22	(1)
2020	Defensor Sporting	27	(1)
2021	Progreso	13	(0)
- * Club domestic league appearances and goals

Rodrigo Rojo Piazze (born 21 July 1989 in Montevideo) is a Uruguayan footballer who played as a defender.

== Club statistics ==
Club	Season	League		Cup		League Cup		Europe		Total	
Club	Season	Apps	Goals	Apps	Goals	Apps	Goals	Apps	Goals	Apps	Goals
Rampla Juniors
Rampla Juniors	2009–10	9	0	0	0	0	0	0	0	9	0
Rampla Juniors	2010–11	18	0	0	0	0	0	0	0	18	0
Rampla Juniors	2011–12	23	1	0	0	0	0	0	0	23	1
Rampla Juniors	Total	50	1	0	0	0	0	0	0	50	1
Fénix
Fénix	2012–13	25	0	0	0	0	0	0	0	25	0
Fénix	2013–14	25	1	0	0	0	0	0	0	25	1
Fénix	Total	50	1	0	0	0	0	0	0	50	1
Újpest
Újpest	2014–15	4	0	2	0	3	0	0	0	9	0
Újpest	Total	4	0	2	0	3	0	0	0	9	0
Olimpia
Olimpia	2016	0	0	0	0	0	0	0	0	0	0
Olimpia	Total	0	0	0	0	0	0	0	0	0	0
Career Total		104	2	2	0	3	0	0	0	109	2

Updated to games played as of 26 October 2014.
