= Lansana Sagna =

Senegalese footballer

Personal information
- Full name: Lansana Sagna
- Date of birth: 17 February 1994 (age 32)
- Place of birth: Dakar, Senegal
- Height: 1.86 m (6 ft 1 in)
- Position: Centre back

Team information
- Current team: US Feurs

Youth career
- 2012–2013: Porto

Senior career*
Years	Team	Apps	(Gls)
2013	RC Dakar		
2014–2015	Újpest	1	(0)
2015–2018	AS Douanes		
2018–2019	Montélimar		
2019–	US Feurs		
- * Club domestic league appearances and goals as of 00:47, 18 October 2019 (UTC)

Lansana Sagna (born 17 February 1994) is a Senegalese professional footballer who plays as a centre back for French lower-league side US Feurs.

== Career ==
Having played for FC Porto's U19-squad from 2012 to 2013, Sagna moved back to Senegal and played for Racing Club de Dakar. In January 2014, he signed with Újpest FC from Hungary together with his friend and teammate Elhadji Badiane Sidibe.

On 5 December 2018, Sagna joined French club UMS Montélimar. He was released by the club in June 2019 and a few weeks later joined US Feurs.
