= Rajmond Toricska =

Hungarian footballer

Personal information
- Full name: Rajmond Toricska
- Date of birth: 11 May 1993 (age 33)
- Place of birth: Cegléd, Hungary
- Height: 1.82 m (6 ft 0 in)
- Position: Midfielder

Team information
- Current team: Kozármisleny (loan from Újpest)
- Number: 19

Youth career
- 2003–2009: Nagykőrös
- 2009: Kecskemét
- 2009–2013: Újpest

Senior career*
| Years | Team | Apps | (Gls) |
| 2013– | Újpest | 1 | (0) |
| 2014– | → Kozármisleny (loan) | 2 | (0) |
- * Club domestic league appearances and goals as of 12 April 2014

Rajmond Toricska (born 11 May 1993 in Cegléd) is a Hungarian professional footballer who plays for Újpest FC.

== Career statistics ==
Appearances and goals by club, season and competition
| Club | Season | League | | | Cup | | League Cup | | Europe | | Total | |
| Club | Season | Division | Apps | Goals | Apps | Goals | Apps | Goals | Apps | Goals | Apps | Goals |
|---|---|---|---|---|---|---|---|---|---|---|---|---|
Újpest
| Újpest | 2011–12 | Nemzeti Bajnokság I | 0 | 0 | 1 | 0 | 0 | 0 | 0 | 0 | 1 | 0 |
| Újpest | 2012–13 | Nemzeti Bajnokság I | 0 | 0 | 0 | 0 | 6 | 2 | 0 | 0 | 6 | 2 |
| Újpest | 2013–14 | Nemzeti Bajnokság I | 1 | 0 | 0 | 0 | 1 | 0 | 0 | 0 | 2 | 0 |
| Újpest | Total | | 1 | 0 | 1 | 0 | 7 | 2 | 0 | 0 | 9 | 2 |
| Kozármisleny | 2013–14 | Nemzeti Bajnokság II | 2 | 0 | 0 | 0 | 0 | 0 | 0 | 0 | 2 | 0 |
| Career total | | | 3 | 0 | 1 | 0 | 7 | 2 | 0 | 0 | 11 | 2 |

Updated to games played as of 12 April 2014.
