= Dani Ponce =

Spanish footballer

Personal information
- Full name: Daniel Ponce de León García
- Date of birth: 16 May 1991 (age 35)
- Place of birth: Torrejón de Ardoz, Spain
- Height: 1.83 m (6 ft 0 in)
- Position: Winger

Team information
- Current team: Gibraltar United
- Number: 10

Youth career
- Torrejón

Senior career*
Years	Team	Apps	(Gls)
2010–2011	Ávila	32	(5)
2011–2012	Coslada	6	(1)
2012–2014	Alcorcón B	44	(12)
2013–2015	Alcorcón	6	(0)
2014	→ Újpest (loan)	2	(0)
2015	→ Fuenlabrada (loan)	12	(2)
2015–2016	Guadalajara	22	(1)
2016–2017	Tarxien Rainbows	29	(5)
2017–2018	Cerceda	12	(0)
2018–	Gibraltar United	34	(12)
- * Club domestic league appearances and goals as of 13 May 2019

Daniel 'Dani' Ponce de León García (born 16 May 1991) is a Spanish professional footballer who plays for Gibraltar United as a winger.

== Football career ==
A product of AD Torrejón CF's youth system, Ponce made his senior debuts in the 2010–11 season with Real Ávila CF, in the fourth division. He continued to compete in the fourth level in the following seasons, representing CD Coslada and AD Alcorcón B.

On 20 October 2013 Ponce made his first appearance with the main squad, playing the last 3 minutes in a 0–1 away loss against Real Jaén. He appeared in further five matches during the campaign, and renewed his link with the Madrid side for three years on 11 July of the following year, being also definitely promoted to the first team.

On 16 August 2014 Ponce was loaned to Hungarian Nemzeti Bajnokság I side Újpest FC. However, he returned to his parent club in September, and moved to CF Fuenlabrada on 20 January 2015, also in a temporary deal.

On 26 July 2015 Ponce joined CD Guadalajara.
