= Homorúd =

- Village
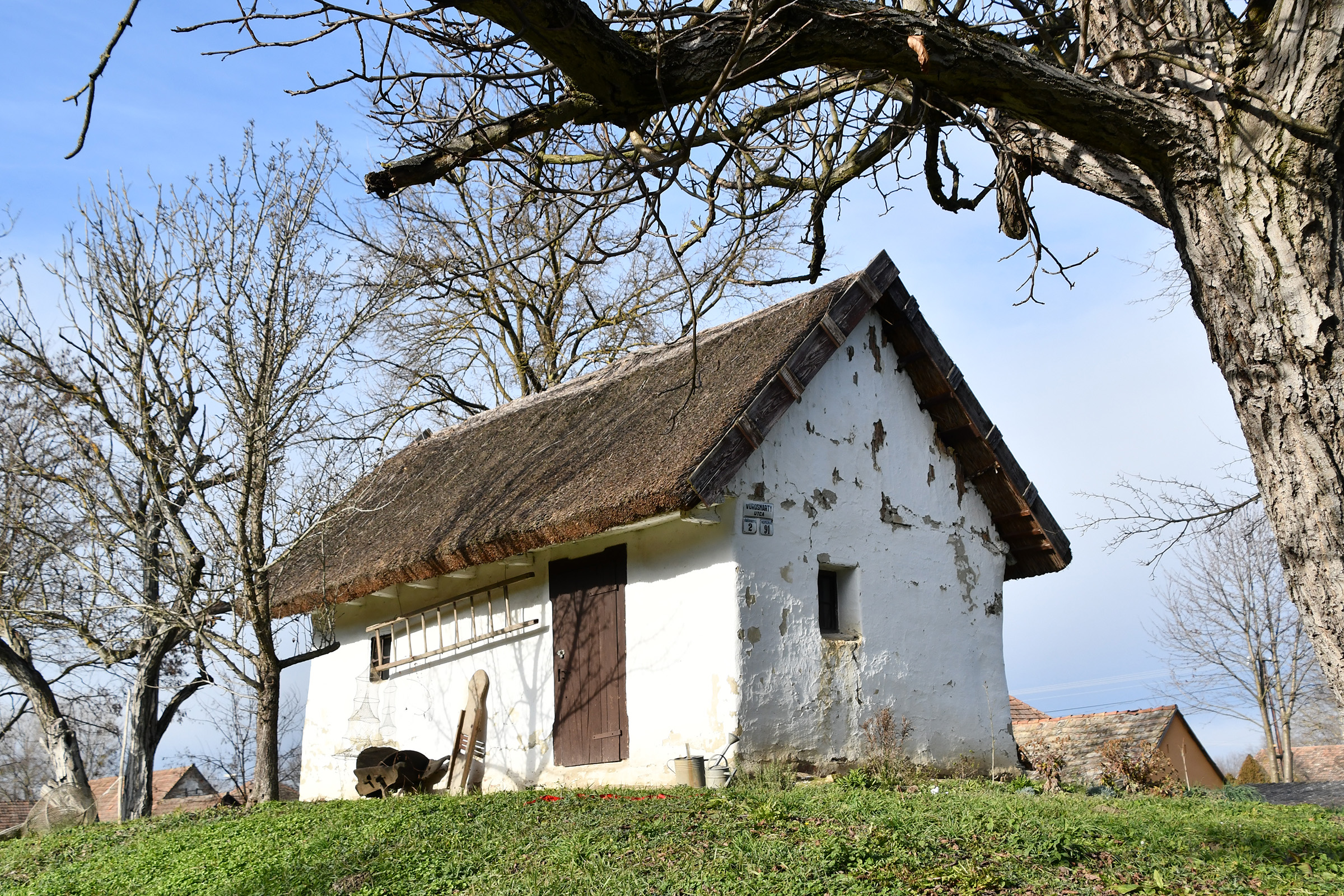
- Interactive map of Homorúd
- Coordinates: 45°59′N 18°48′E
- Country: Hungary
- County: Baranya
- Time zone: UTC+1 (CET)
  - Summer (DST): UTC+2 (CEST)

Homorúd is a village in Baranya county, Hungary.
