= Filip Stanisavljević =

Serbian footballer

Personal information
- Date of birth: 20 May 1987 (age 39)
- Place of birth: Požarevac, SFR Yugoslavia
- Height: 1.82 m (6 ft 0 in)
- Position: Defensive midfielder

Team information
- Current team: Podunavac

Youth career
- Partizan

Senior career*
Years	Team	Apps	(Gls)
2007–2009	Metalac GM	44	(0)
2009–2012	Javor Ivanjica	71	(1)
2012–2015	Újpest	58	(7)
2015–2018	Platanias	57	(0)
2018–2020	Radnik Surdulica	51	(1)
2020	Mladost Lučani	10	(0)
2021	Rad	15	(0)
2021–2022	Voždovac	21	(1)
2022–2023	OFK Vršac	24	(1)
2023–2024	Novi Banovci		
2024–	Podunavac		
- * Club domestic league appearances and goals as of 2 October 2022

Filip Stanisavljević (born 20 May 1987) is a Serbian football midfielder who plays for Podunavac Ritopek.

== Career ==
After playing for Metalac Gornji Milanovac, Javor Ivanjica, Újpest and Platanias, Stanisavljević signed for Radnik Surdulica in 2018.

On 1 July 2021, he signed with Voždovac.

== Career statistics ==
As of 14 August 2019

Club	Season	League		National Cup		League Cup		Other		Total	
Club	Season	Apps	Goals	Apps	Goals	Apps	Goals	Apps	Goals	Apps	Goals
Javor Ivanjica	2009-10	15	0	0	0	—		—		15	0
Javor Ivanjica	2010-11	28	1	0	0	—		—		28	1
Javor Ivanjica	2011-12	28	0	2	0	—		—		30	0
Javor Ivanjica	Total	71	1	2	0	—		—		73	1
Újpest	2012-13	16	0	0	0	1	0	0	0	17	0
Újpest	2013-14	16	3	5	0	5	2	0	0	26	5
Újpest	2014-15	26	4	5	1	7	2	1	0	39	7
Újpest	Total	58	7	10	1	13	4	1	0	82	12
Platanias	2015-16	21	0	5	0	—		—		26	0
Platanias	2016-17	20	0	5	0	—		—		25	0
Platanias	2017-18	16	0	2	0	—		—		18	0
Platanias	Total	57	0	12	0	—		—		69	0
Radnik Surdulica	2018-19	29	1	1	0	—		—		30	1
Radnik Surdulica	2019-20	4	0	0	0	—		—		4	0
Radnik Surdulica	Total	33	1	1	0	—		—		34	1
Career total		219	9	25	1	13	4	1	0	258	14

== Honours ==
Újpest

- Hungarian Cup (1): 2013–14
- Hungarian Super Cup (1): 2013–14
