= Sátorhely =

- Village (Falva)
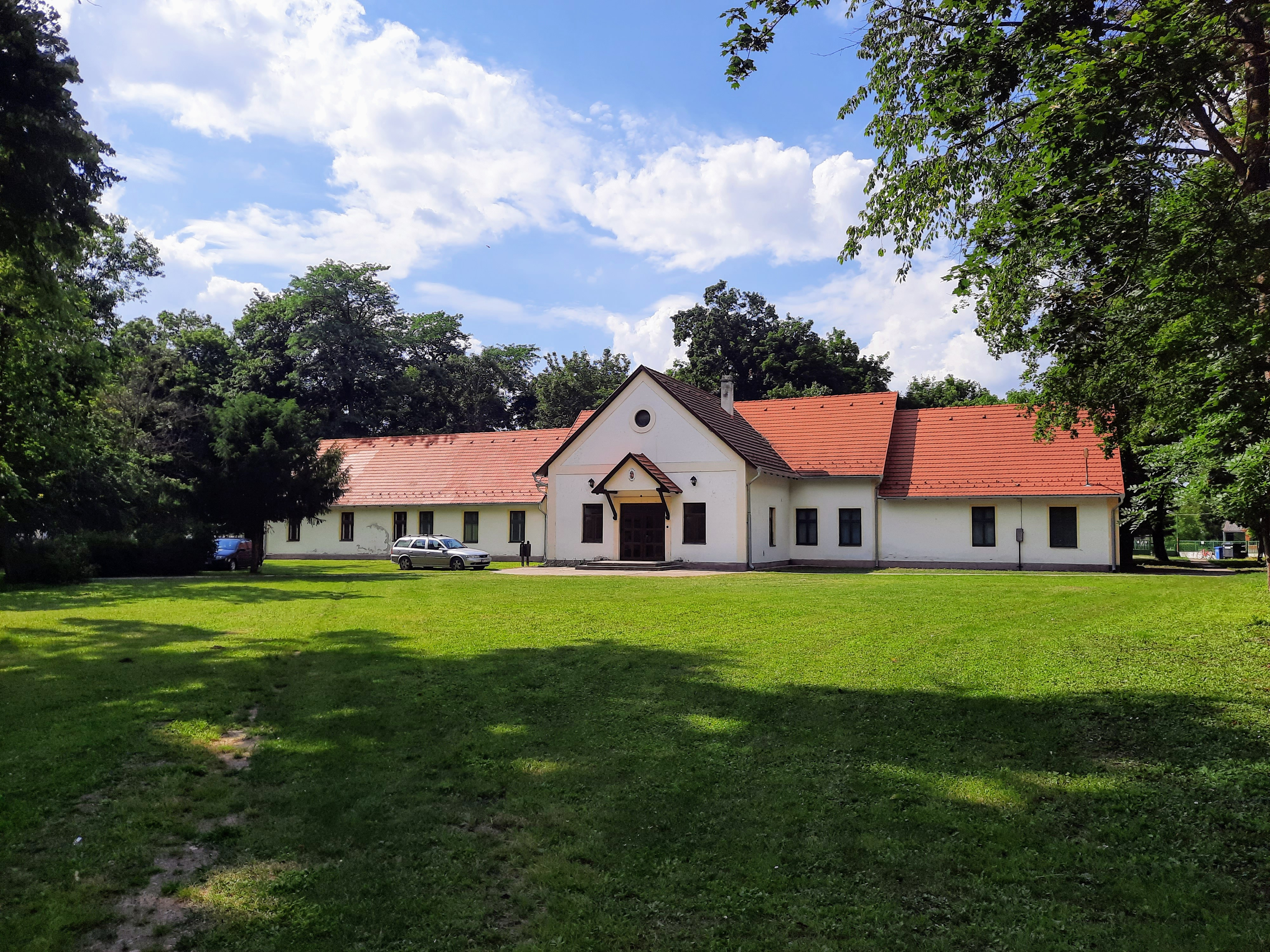

- Location within Baranya County Location within Hungary
- Coordinates: 45°56′N 18°38′E
- Country: Hungary
- Region: Southern Transdanubia
- County: Baranya
- District: Mohács

Population (2024)
  - Total: 589
- Time zone: UTC+1 (CET)
  - Summer (DST): UTC+2 (CEST)
- Postal code: 7785

Sátorhely is a village in the Mohács district of Baranya county in Hungary. It is likely the site of the 1526 Battle of Mohács.
