= Véménd =

Véménd Wemend
- Village (Falva)
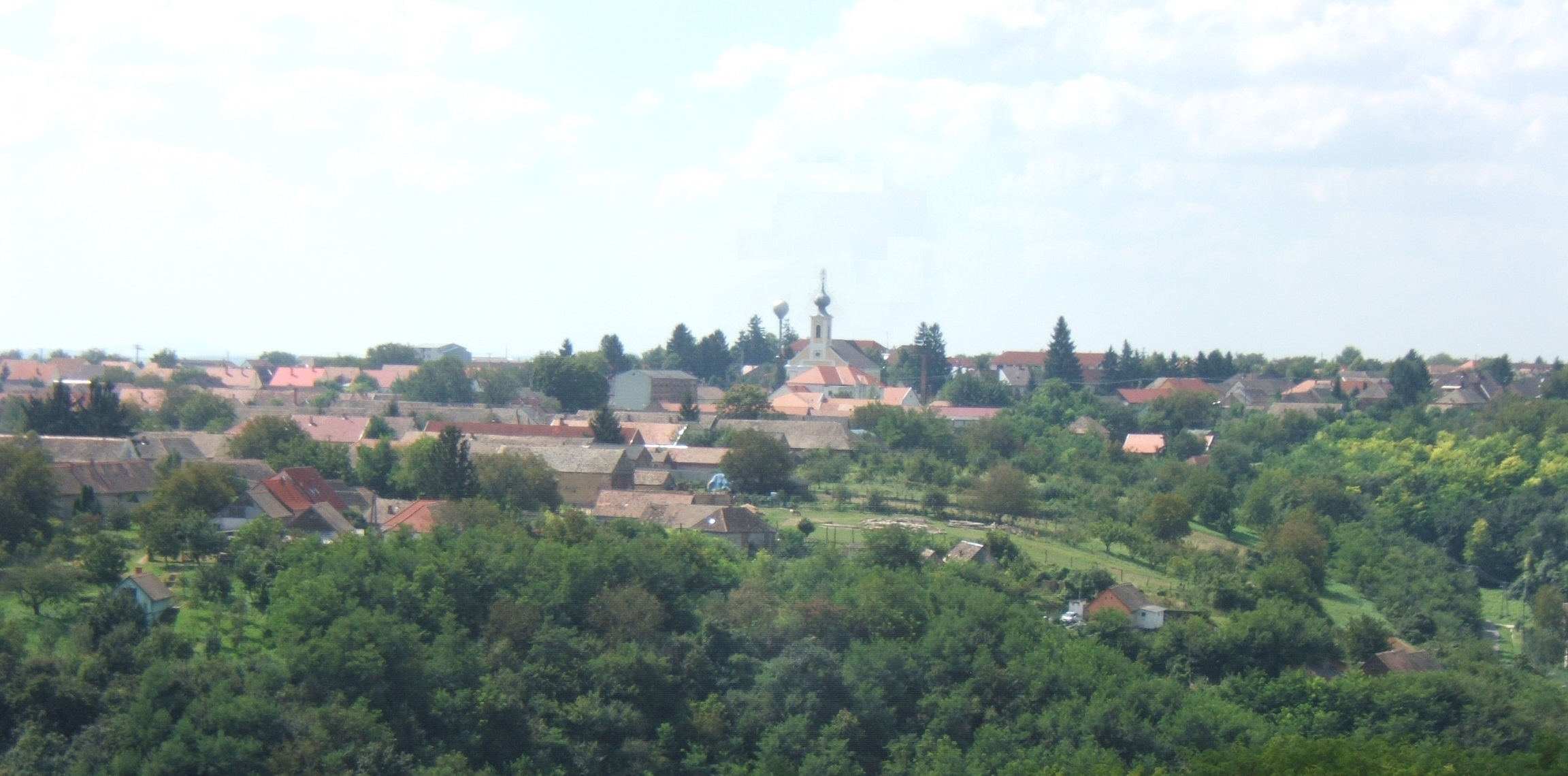
- General view

- Seal

- Location in Hungary
- Coordinates: 46°09′N 18°37′E
- Country: Hungary
- County: Baranya
- Time zone: UTC+1 (CET)
  - Summer (DST): UTC+2 (CEST)
- Website: https://vemend.hu/

Véménd (German: Wemend) is a village in Baranya County, Hungary. Until the end of World War II, the inhabitants were Danube Swabians. Most of the former German settlers were expelled to Germany and Austria in 1947–1948, in accordance with the Potsdam Agreement. Only a few Germans live in the village today, while most of the population are descendants of Hungarians from the Czechoslovak–Hungarian population exchange.
