= Sándor Molnár =

Hungarian footballer

Personal information
- Full name: Sándor Molnár
- Date of birth: 29 June 1994 (age 32)
- Place of birth: Budapest, Hungary
- Height: 1.83 m (6 ft 0 in)
- Position: Defender

Team information
- Current team: Komárom

Youth career
- 2002–2012: Újpest
- 2008–2009: → Szombathely (loan)

Senior career*
Years	Team	Apps	(Gls)
2012–2013	Újpest II	4	(0)
2013–2015	Újpest	2	(0)
2015–2017	Újpest II	?	(?)
2017–2018	BKV Előre	7	(0)
2018	Balassagyarmat	11	(0)
2018–2019	FC Dabas	27	(0)
2019–	Komárom	13	(0)
- * Club domestic league appearances and goals as of 22:15, 21 December 2019 (UTC)

Sándor Molnár (born 29 June 1994) is a Hungarian professional footballer who plays for Komárom VSE.

== Career statistics ==
Appearances and goals by club, season and competition
Club	Season	League			Cup		League Cup		Europe		Total	
Club	Season	Division	Apps	Goals	Apps	Goals	Apps	Goals	Apps	Goals	Apps	Goals
Újpest
Újpest	2011–12	Nemzeti Bajnokság I	0	0	1	0	0	0	0	0	1	0
Újpest	2012–13	Nemzeti Bajnokság I	0	0	0	0	2	0	0	0	2	0
Újpest	2013–14	Nemzeti Bajnokság I	2	0	0	0	0	0	0	0	2	0
Újpest	Total		2	0	1	0	2	0	0	0	5	0
Career total			2	0	1	0	2	0	0	0	5	0

Updated to games played as of 4 August 2013.
