= Simon Ligot =

Belgian footballer

Personal information
- Full name: Simon Valentin Ligot
- Date of birth: 24 March 1993 (age 33)
- Place of birth: Namur, Belgium
- Height: 1.81 m (5 ft 11 1/2 in)
- Position: Defender

Team information
- Current team: Liège
- Number: 2

Youth career
- 2005–2013: Standard Liège

Senior career*
Years	Team	Apps	(Gls)
2013–2015	Standard Liège	0	(0)
2013–2014	→ Újpest (loan)	12	(0)
2014–2015	→ Visé (loan)	24	(0)
2015–	Liège	11	(0)

International career
2009–2010	Belgium U17	1	(0)
2010–2011	Belgium U18		
- * Club domestic league appearances and goals as of 8 December 2015

Simon Ligot (born 24 March 1993) is a Belgian defender who currently plays for Liège.
