= José María Antón =

Spanish footballer

Chema Antón
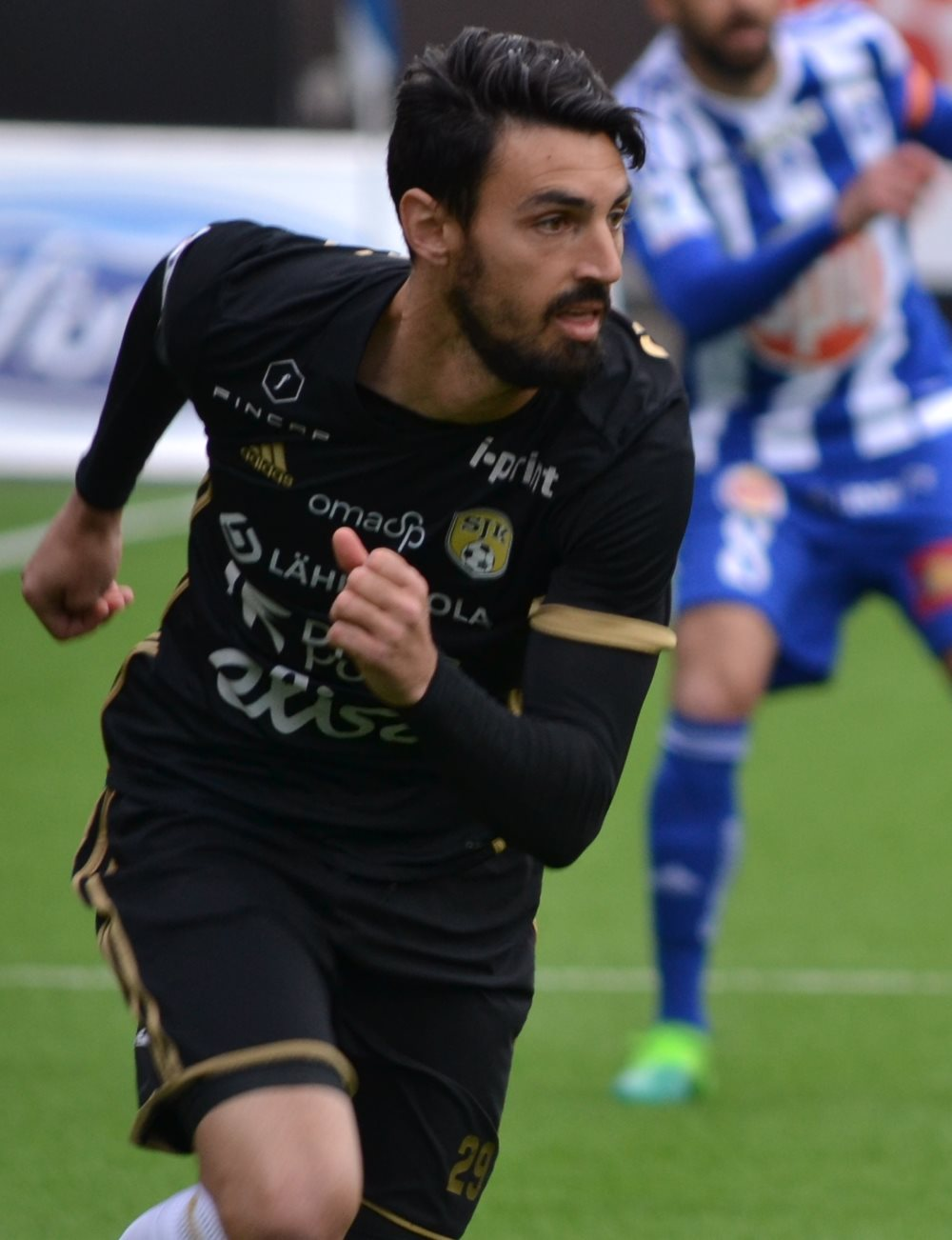
- Antón with SJK in 2017

Personal information
- Full name: José María Antón Samper
- Date of birth: 19 March 1989 (age 37)
- Place of birth: Casas del Señor, Spain
- Height: 1.83 m (6 ft 0 in)
- Position: Left back

Youth career
- Kelme
- 2003–2007: Real Madrid

Senior career*
Years	Team	Apps	(Gls)
2007–2010	Real Madrid B	55	(1)
2010–2011	Betis B	31	(0)
2011–2012	Red Bull Salzburg	4	(0)
2012–2014	Újpest	44	(2)
2015	Conquense	13	(2)
2015–2016	Guijuelo	24	(0)
2016–2017	Eldense	24	(0)
2017	SJK	12	(0)

International career
2008	Spain U19	8	(0)
- * Club domestic league appearances and goals as of 19 November 2017

José María "Chema" Antón Samper (born 19 March 1989) is a Spanish professional footballer who plays as a left back.

== Club career ==
Born in Casas del Señor, Valencian Community, Antón joined Real Madrid's youth system in 2003, aged 14. Four years later he made his senior debut, spending three full seasons with the B-team in Segunda División B.

Without actually appearing in La Liga, Antón was an unused substitute in Bernd Schuster's last game in charge of the first team, a 3–4 home loss against Sevilla FC on 7 December 2008. The following match, a 0–2 defeat at FC Barcelona in Juande Ramos' debut, he was again on the bench.

On 28 July 2010, Antón moved to Real Betis, spending his first and only season in Andalusia with the reserves also in the third level. In the summer of 2011 he had a trial with FC Red Bull Salzburg, signing shortly after and joining Hungarian top flight club Újpest FC the following year.

Antón signed for UB Conquense on 30 January 2015, receiving the international clearance seven days later. He continued competing in division three in the following years, with CD Guijuelo and CD Eldense.

On 28 March 2017, Antón agreed to a one-year contract at Seinäjoen Jalkapallokerho in the Finnish Veikkausliiga.

== Career statistics ==
As of 23 October 2024.

Appearances and goals by club, season and competition
Club	Season	League			Cup (Note: Includes Copa del Rey, Austrian Cup, Hungarian Cup and Ligakupa)		Europe		Total	
Club	Season	Division	Apps	Goals	Apps	Goals	Apps	Goals	Apps	Goals
Real Madrid	2008–09	La Liga	0	0	0	0	0	0	0	0
Real Madrid B	2007–08	Segunda División B	30	1	–		–		30	1
Real Madrid B	2008–09	Segunda División B	24	0	–		–		24	0
Real Madrid B	2009–10	Segunda División B	1	0	–		–		1	0
Real Madrid B	Total		55	1	0	0	0	0	55	1
Real Betis B	2010–11	Segunda División B	33	0	–		–		33	0
Red Bull Salzburg	2011–12	Austrian Bundesliga	4	0	2	0	1 (Note: Appearance(s) in UEFA Europa League)	0	7	0
USK Anif	2011–12	Austrian Regionalliga West	1	0	–		–		1	0
Újpest	2012–13	NB I	26	2	1	0	–		27	2
Újpest	2013–14	NB I	18	0	6	0	–		24	0
Újpest	Total		44	2	7	0	0	0	51	2
Conquense	2014–15	Segunda División B	13	2	–		–		13	2
Guijuelo	2015–16	Segunda División B	24	0	1	0	–		25	0
Eldense	2016–17	Segunda División B	24	0	–		–		24	0
SJK Seinäjoki	2017	Veikkausliiga	12	0	0	0	0	0	12	0
Career total			200	5	10	0	1	0	211	5

== Honours ==
Újpest

- Magyar Kupa: 2013–14
