= Palotabozsok =

Palotabozsok Boschok
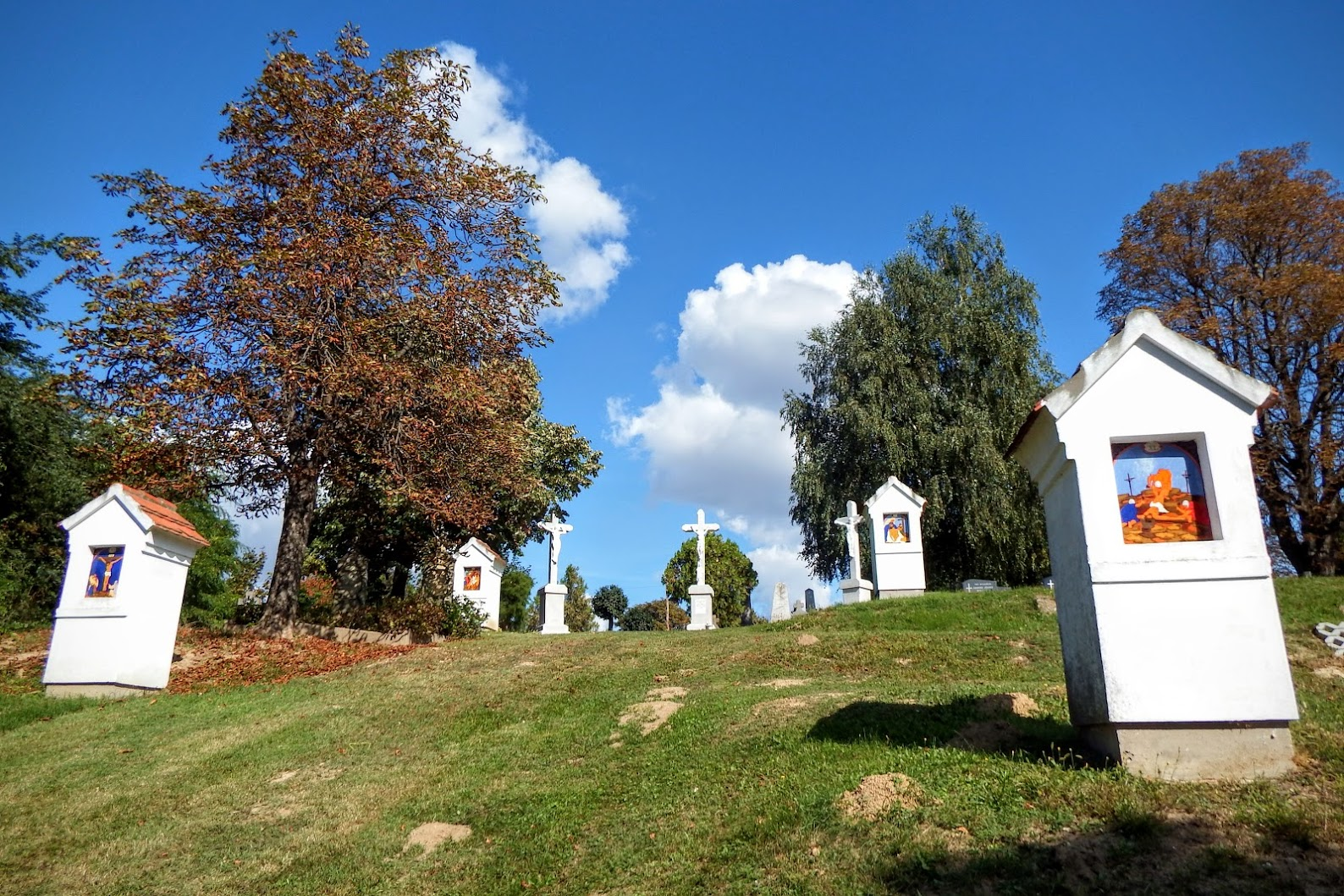
- Calvary at Palotabozsok

- Location of Baranya County in Hungary

- Location of Palotabozsok
- Coordinates: 46.12553°N 18.64180°E
- Country: Hungary
- County: Baranya

Area
  - Total: 20.19 km^{2} (7.80 sq mi)

Population (2004)
  - Total: 1,063
  - Density: 52.64/km^{2} (136.3/sq mi)
- Time zone: UTC+1 (CET)
  - Summer (DST): UTC+2 (CEST)
- Postal code: 7727
- Area code: 69

Palotabozsok (German: Boschok; Croatian: Božuk) is a village in Baranya County, Hungary.
