= Károli Gáspár University of the Reformed Church in Hungary =

Christian university in Budapest, Hungary

- Károli Gáspár Református Egyetem
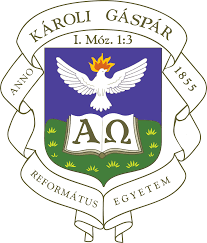
- Coat of Arms
- Former names: Reformed Theological Academy of Budapest
- Motto in English: Quality. Community. Károli.
- Established: 1855
- Chancellor: Gyula Balázs Csáki-Hatalovics
- Rector: László Trócsányi
- Academic staff: 600
- Students: c. 9,000
- Location: Budapest, Hungary
- Campus: 9 Kálvin square, Budapest
- Website: kre.hu/english/
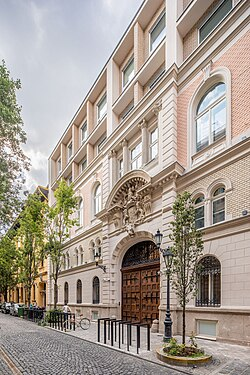
- One of the buildings of the Faculty of Humanities and Social Sciences

University rankings

Regional – Overall
- QS Emerging Europe and Central Asia: 351-400 (2022)
- QS Europe: 601+ (2025)

Károli Gáspár University of the Reformed Church in Hungary (Hungarian: Károli Gáspár Református Egyetem), also known as KRE, is a Christian university in Budapest, Hungary. The university is named after Gáspár Károlyi. The university, which is among Hungary's top 10 universities, blends the heritage of Protestant Christian learning with modern professional advancements.

== Faculties ==
The university has four Doctoral Schools which offer Ph.D programmes in history, psychology, law, and theology:

- Faculty of Humanities and Social Sciences: Established in 1993. The faculty offers a wide range of Bachelor's, Master's and postgraduate programmes in both Hungarian and foreign languages, along with two doctoral schools. It ranks third nationally in the number of first-place applicants in the humanities field ranking of "HVG Diploma 2025".
- Faculty of Law: Established in 1998. Is the successor of the Kecskemét Reformed Church Law Academy (founded in 1831). The faculty offers several undergraduate, graduate und postgraduate programmes, including of course the traditional single-cycle law programme. The academic staff includes numerous nationally recognized and respected legal experts (e.g. constitutional judge, curia judge or the head of Office of Economic Competition). Currently, the faculty offers the following programmes in English, for international students: LL.M. in European and International Business Law and PhD studies in Law and Political Sciences.
- Faculty of Pedagogy: The predecessor of the faculty was founded in 1839. It became one of the founding faculties of Károli Gáspár University in 1993. The faculty offers degrees of teacher training, theology and humanities across four locations: Budapest, Nagykőrös, Kecskemét and Marosvásárhely/ Târgu Mureș.
- Faculty of Theology: Founded in 1993 as the successor of the Budapest Reformed Theological Academy (1855). The faculty provides a family atmosphere with personalized attention to students. The Ráday Higher Education Student Residence, inaugurated in 2022, is a state-of-the-art and comfortable dormitory located in the headquarters of the Danubian Reformed Church District. It offers 58 double rooms with private bathrooms, along with various communal areas. Functioning as a close-knit residential community, the dormitory primarily serves students of the Faculty of Theology at Károli Gáspár University of the Reformed Church in Hungary, providing them with a supportive environment for their preparation for ministry and religious education.

There is also the Faculty of Economics, Health Sciences and Social Studies.

The new campus of the KRE will be built in the vicinity of Markusovszky Square with state and church funding, and will accommodate the Faculty of Law and the Institute of Psychology, which will simultaneously host more than 2,000 students. The Reformed Church of Hungary announced previously an open architectural competition for the design of the new campus in Ferencváros. Total of 42 architectural firms submitted their proposals. The winning entry was selected by a jury of experts from Archikon Architects, Budapest.

== Accommodation ==
Károli University has dormitories and residence halls for full-time students. The University also offers international students accommodation possibilities. The University is in partnership with two student dormitories in Budapest:

- Óbuda Student Hostel
- Bethlen Gábor Dormitory

== Scholarships ==
Foreign citizens can apply for the following scholarships: Stipendium Hungaricum Scholarship Programme, Károli Christian Scholarship, Scholarship for Christian Young People and Hungarian Diaspora Scholarship.

== International relations ==
The university has established bilateral contacts and cooperations with about 160 partner institutions across 37 countries worldwide. Most of the partners are European universities, but the number of partnerships with overseas universities is continuously growing (USA, Canada, Korea, Japan). Within Europe, the Erasmus+ Programme of the European Union plays a central role in facilitating international coopearation. The university is also a member of the regional CEEPUS mobility programme. In addition, Károli also participates in the International Credit Mobility (ICM) programme, which facilities both the outbound mobility of Károli students to overseas universities and the inbound mobility of exchange students from abroad. Its main focus, as a Christian university, is to establish connections with other Christian higher education institutions globally. In order to make this easier, the University has become a part of the International Network for Christian Higher Education (INCHE) and is affiliated with the Council of Christian Colleges and Universities (CCCU) as an associate member. From 2015 onwards, Károli Gáspár University, along with more than 900 universities globally, has signed the Magna Charta Universitatum to uphold academic freedom and autonomy in higher education institutions.

== Sports ==
The university offers football, basketball, floorball, water polo and ice hockey training sessions. The university's volleyball team is four-time Budapest champion, the handball team is two-time Budapest champion and the beach handball team is three-time national champion. There are plenty of opportunities for recreational sports as well: aerobics, zumba, pilates, dance, and martial arts. The Sports Club of Károli Gáspár University (Károli SC) with 4+1 sections offers all participants of competitive sports and leisure sports a variety of forms of exercise, high level coaching and competition opportunities.

== Notable students and alumni ==
- Áron Szilágyi: three-time Olympic champion, World and European champion fencer
- Gabriella Szabó: three-time Olympic champion, World and European champion sprint canoer
- Róbert Puzsér: publicist, social critic
- Leila Gyenesei: World Champion modern pentathlete
- Dóra Deáki: CWC-winner, Champions League silver medallist handball player
- Anna Pásztor: singer, songwriter, composer
- Miklós Gór-Nagy: World Champion water polo player
- Péter Tibolya: World and European Champion in Modern Pentathlon
- Renáta Katona: World Champion sabre fencer
- Luca Vajda: European Championship and World Beach Games silver medallist, beach handball player for the national team
- Fanni Pigniczki: Olympian, bronze medallist world champion, double World Student Games gold medal rhythmic gymnast
- Balázs Szép: Olympian, world and European champion pentathlete
- Virág Koroknyai: Miss World Hungary 2017

== Sources ==
- Enikő Sepsi, Péter Balla, Márton Csanády (2014). Confessionality and University in the Modern World - 20th Anniversary of the "Károli" University. Studio Caroliensia
