= Himesháza =

- Village
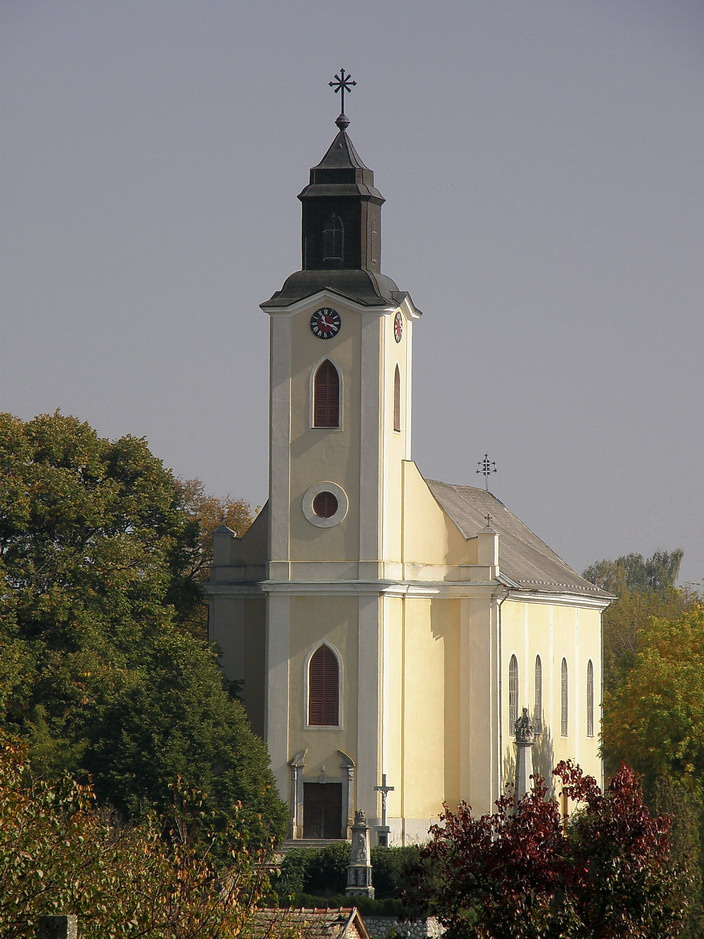
- Church of the Nativity of the Virgin Mary

- Coat of arms

- Location within Hungary
- Coordinates: 46°05′N 18°34′E
- Country: Hungary
- County: Baranya
- District: Mohács
- Time zone: UTC+1 (CET)
  - Summer (DST): UTC+2 (CEST)
- Website: https://himeshaza.hu/

Himesháza (German: Nimmersch) is a village in Baranya county, Hungary. Until the end of World War II, the inhabitants' majority was Danube Swabian, also called locally as Stifolder, because their ancestors arrived the 17th and 18th centuries from Fulda (district). Most of the former German settlers were expelled to Allied-occupied Germany and Allied-occupied Austria in 1945–1948, under the Potsdam Agreement. Only a few Germans of Hungary live there, the majority today are the descendants of Hungarians from the Czechoslovak–Hungarian population exchange.

== Notable people ==
- Norbert Michelisz, racing driver

== Literature ==
- Michael Mott (Fulda): Fuldaer Einwanderer in Himesháza/Ungarn, in: "Buchenblätter" Fuldaer Zeitung, 59. Jahrg., Nr. 16, 20. Juni 1986, S. 61,62;Nr. 17, 4. Juli 1986, S. 67,68.
