= 2012–13 Diósgyőri VTK season =

Diósgyőri VTK
2012–13 season
- Chairman: (Hungary) Hunor Dudás
- Manager: (Hungary) Tibor Sisa (until 22 Szeptember 2012) (Hungary) Lázár Szentes (until 16 April 2013) (Croatia) Zoltán Kovács
- NB 1: 10.
- Hungarian Cup: Round of 16
- Hungarian League Cup: Group Stage
- Top goalscorer: League: Tibor Tisza (6); José Luque (6); All: Tibor Tisza (18)
- Highest home attendance: 10,000 v Ferencváros (21 April 2013)
- Lowest home attendance: 1,000 v Honvéd (28 November 2012)
Home colours	Away colours

The 2012–13 season will be Diósgyőri VTK's 47th competitive season, 2nd consecutive season in the OTP Bank Liga and 102nd year in existence as a football club.

== First team squad ==
Note: Flags indicate national team as defined under FIFA eligibility rules; some limited exceptions apply. Players may hold more than one non-FIFA nationality.

No.	Pos.	Nation	Player
1	GK	HUN	Norbert Tajti
4	DF	HUN	Tamás Kádár (loan from Roda JC)
6	DF	HUN	Gergő Gohér
7	MF	ESP	Francisco Gallardo
8	MF	HUN	Péter Takács
9	FW	HUN	Patrik Bacsa
10	MF	CMR	Mohamadolu Abdouraman
12	GK	SVK	Ladislav Rybánsky
14	DF	HUN	Tamás Nagy
15	DF	HUN	András Vági
17	FW	HUN	Gergely Rudolf

No.	Pos.	Nation	Player
18	FW	HUN	András Gosztonyi
20	MF	ESP	Fernando
21	MF	HUN	Martin Csirszki
23	DF	HUN	Viktor Vadász
25	MF	HUN	Ákos Elek
27	MF	SVK	Michal Hanek
28	FW	HUN	Tibor Tisza
77	MF	ESP	José Juan Luque
88	FW	FRA	L´Imam Seydi
95	MF	HUN	Balázs Szabó

== Transfers ==
=== Summer ===
In: Note: Flags indicate national team as defined under FIFA eligibility rules; some limited exceptions apply. Players may hold more than one non-FIFA nationality.

No.	Pos.	Nation	Player
8	MF	HUN	Péter Takács (from Pápa)
11	DF	BRA	Jeff Silva (loan from Videoton)
12	GK	SVK	Ladislav Rybánsky (from Siófok)
16	MF	HUN	Tibor Halgas (loan return from Kazincbarcika)
17	FW	HUN	Gergely Rudolf (from (Italy) Genoa)
18	MF	HUN	András Gosztonyi (from Videoton)
19	MF	HUN	Péter Szabó (loan return from Kazincbarcika)
24	FW	HUN	Szabolcs Pál (loan return from Siófok)
25	MF	HUN	Ákos Elek (from Videoton)
27	MF	SVK	Michal Hanek (from (Austria) Kapfenberg)
37	MF	SVK	Richárd Illés (loan return from Kazincbarcika)
63	GK	HUN	Róbert Ambrusics (from (England) Cambridge United)

Out: Note: Flags indicate national team as defined under FIFA eligibility rules; some limited exceptions apply. Players may hold more than one non-FIFA nationality.

No.	Pos.	Nation	Player
1	GK	CRO	Ivan Radoš (loan to (Azerbaijan) Kapaz)
8	MF	BOL	Vicente Arze (to (Belgium) Charleroi)
11	MF	HUN	Péter Takács (loan return to Pápa)
16	MF	HUN	Tibor Halgas (loan to Cegléd)
17	DF	HUN	Krisztián Budovinszky (to Zalaegerszeg)
19	MF	HUN	Péter Szabó (to Ajka)
21	FW	CMR	George Menougong (to Kazincbarcika)
24	FW	HUN	Szabolcs Pál (to Siófok)
37	MF	SVK	Richárd Illés (to Putnok)
75	MF	BRA	Bernardo Frizoni (to Zalaegerszeg)
98	MF	MAR	Youssef Sekour (loan to Pápa)
99	MF	HUN	Attila Dobos (to Mezőkövesd)
—	FW	HUN	Marcell Hornyák (loan to Kazincbarcika)

=== Winter ===
In: Note: Flags indicate national team as defined under FIFA eligibility rules; some limited exceptions apply. Players may hold more than one non-FIFA nationality.

No.	Pos.	Nation	Player
4	DF	HUN	Tamás Kádár (loan from (Netherlands) Roda)
16	MF	HUN	Tibor Halgas (loan return from Cegléd)
98	MF	MAR	Youssef Sekour (loan return from Pápa)

Out: Note: Flags indicate national team as defined under FIFA eligibility rules; some limited exceptions apply. Players may hold more than one non-FIFA nationality.

No.	Pos.	Nation	Player
5	DF	CRO	Igor Gal
11	DF	BRA	Jeff Silva (loan return to Videoton)
16	MF	HUN	Tibor Halgas (to Kazincbarcika)
26	DF	SRB	Savo Raković (to Eger)
91	MF	HUN	Péter Bogáti (loan to Kazincbarcika)

- List of Hungarian football transfers summer 2012
- List of Hungarian football transfers winter 2012–13

== Statistics ==
=== Appearances and goals ===
Last updated on 2 June 2013.

No.	Pos	Nat	Player	Total		OTP Bank Liga		Hungarian Cup		League Cup	
No.	Pos	Nat	Player	Apps	Goals	Apps	Goals	Apps	Goals	Apps	Goals
1	GK	(Hungary) HUN	Norbert Tajti	12	-17	4	-5	4	-6	4	-6
4	DF	(Hungary) HUN	Tamás Kádár	13	1	13	1	0	0	0	0
6	DF	(Hungary) HUN	Gergő Gohér	36	3	29	2	2	0	5	1
7	MF	(Spain) ESP	Francisco Gallardo	24	1	21	1	2	0	1	0
8	MF	(Hungary) HUN	Péter Takács	33	0	23	0	4	0	6	0
9	FW	(Hungary) HUN	Patrik Bacsa	34	5	28	3	3	1	3	1
10	MF	(Cameroon) CMR	Mohamadolu Abdouraman	16	0	12	0	2	0	2	0
12	GK	(Slovakia) SVK	Ladislav Rybánsky	27	-36	26	-34	0	0	1	-2
14	DF	(Hungary) HUN	Tamás Nagy	20	1	13	0	2	0	5	1
15	DF	(Hungary) HUN	András Vági	31	0	25	0	2	0	4	0
17	FW	(Hungary) HUN	Gergely Rudolf	17	1	15	1	1	0	1	0
18	FW	(Hungary) HUN	András Gosztonyi	29	1	21	0	3	1	5	0
20	MF	(Spain) ESP	Fernando	34	5	26	5	3	0	5	0
21	MF	(Hungary) HUN	Martin Csirszki	13	0	5	0	3	0	5	0
23	DF	(Hungary) HUN	Viktor Vadász	24	1	17	0	3	1	4	0
25	MF	(Hungary) HUN	Ákos Elek	29	1	27	1	2	0	0	0
27	MF	(Slovakia) SVK	Michal Hanek	25	0	18	0	4	0	3	0
28	FW	(Hungary) HUN	Tibor Tisza	35	18	25	6	4	4	6	8
77	MF	(Spain) ESP	José Luque	25	7	22	6	1	1	2	0
88	FW	(France) FRA	L´Imam Seydi	24	7	22	4	2	3	0	0
95	MF	(Hungary) HUN	Balázs Szabó	2	0	1	0	0	0	1	0
Youth players:
45	DF	(Hungary) HUN	Zsolt Icsó	2	0	0	0	0	0	2	0
59	FW	(Hungary) HUN	Szilárd Kovács	1	0	0	0	0	0	1	0
63	GK	(Hungary) HUN	Róbert Ambrusics	1	-5	0	0	0	0	1	-5
67	DF	(Hungary) HUN	Máté Hutter	1	0	0	0	0	0	1	0
94	DF	(Hungary) HUN	Gábor Eperjesi	2	0	0	0	1	0	1	0
96	MF	(Hungary) HUN	István Timkó	2	0	0	0	0	0	2	0
Players out to loan:
91	MF	(Hungary) HUN	Péter Bogáti	7	0	2	0	1	0	4	0
Players no longer at the club:
5	DF	(Croatia) CRO	Igor Gal	15	0	10	0	3	0	2	0
11	DF	(Brazil) BRA	Jeff Silva	12	1	5	1	2	0	5	0
26	DF	(Serbia) SRB	Savo Raković	8	0	6	0	1	0	1	0

=== Top scorers ===
Includes all competitive matches. The list is sorted by shirt number when total goals are equal.

Last updated on 2 June 2013

Position	Nation	Number	Name	OTP Bank Liga	Hungarian Cup	League Cup	Total
1	(Hungary)	28	Tibor Tisza	6	4	8	18
2	(Spain)	77	José Luque	6	1	0	7
3	(France)	88	L´Imam Seydi	4	3	0	7
4	(Spain)	20	Fernando	5	0	0	5
5	(Hungary)	91	Patrik Bacsa	3	1	1	5
6	(Hungary)	6	Gergő Gohér	2	0	1	3
7	(Hungary)	25	Ákos Elek	1	0	0	1
8	(Brazil)	11	Jeff Silva	1	0	0	1
9	(Spain)	7	Francisco Gallardo	1	0	0	1
10	(Hungary)	17	Gergely Rudolf	1	0	0	1
11	(Hungary)	4	Tamás Kádár	1	0	0	1
12	(Hungary)	23	Viktor Vadász	0	1	0	1
13	(Hungary)	18	András Gosztonyi	0	1	0	1
14	(Hungary)	14	Tamás Nagy	0	0	1	1
/	/	/	Own Goals	0	0	0	0
			TOTALS	31	11	11	53

=== Disciplinary record ===
Includes all competitive matches. Players with 1 card or more included only.

Last updated on 2 June 2013

Position	Nation	Number	Name	OTP Bank Liga		Hungarian Cup		League Cup		Total (Hu Total)	
Position	Nation	Number	Name	Booked	Sent off (straight red)	Booked	Sent off (straight red)	Booked	Sent off (straight red)	Booked	Sent off (straight red)
GK	(Hungary)	1	Norbert Tajti	1	0	0	0	0	0	1 (1)	0 (0)
DF	(Hungary)	4	Tamás Kádár	2	0	0	0	0	0	2 (2)	0 (0)
DF	(Croatia)	5	Igor Gal	1	0	0	0	1	0	2 (1)	0 (0)
DF	(Hungary)	6	Gergő Gohér	6	0	1	0	0	0	7 (6)	0 (0)
MF	(Spain)	7	Francisco Gallardo	3	0	0	0	0	0	3 (3)	0 (0)
MF	(Hungary)	8	Péter Takács	8	0	1	0	0	0	9 (8)	0 (0)
FW	(Hungary)	9	Patrik Bacsa	2	0	0	0	0	0	2 (2)	0 (0)
MF	(Cameroon)	10	Mohamadolu Abdouraman	4	0	1	0	0	0	5 (4)	0 (0)
DF	(Brazil)	11	Jeff Silva	1	0	0	1	0	0	1 (1)	1 (0)
GK	(Slovakia)	12	Ladislav Rybánsky	6	0	0	0	0	0	6 (6)	0 (0)
DF	(Hungary)	14	Tamás Nagy	1	1	0	0	2	0	3 (1)	1 (1)
DF	(Hungary)	15	András Vági	4	1	1	0	1	0	6 (4)	1 (1)
FW	(Hungary)	17	Gergely Rudolf	2	0	0	0	0	0	2 (2)	0 (0)
FW	(Hungary)	18	András Gosztonyi	6	1	0	0	1	0	7 (6)	1 (1)
MF	(Spain)	20	Fernando	3	0	0	0	1	0	4 (3)	0 (0)
MF	(Hungary)	21	Martin Csirszki	1	0	0	0	2	0	3 (1)	0 (0)
DF	(Hungary)	23	Viktor Vadász	2	1	0	0	0	0	2 (2)	1 (1)
MF	(Hungary)	25	Ákos Elek	5	1	0	0	0	0	5 (5)	1 (1)
MF	(Slovakia)	27	Michal Hanek	5	2	1	0	1	1	7 (5)	3 (2)
FW	(Hungary)	28	Tibor Tisza	2	0	1	0	1	0	4 (2)	0 (0)
MF	(Spain)	77	José Luque	6	0	0	0	1	0	7 (6)	0 (0)
FW	(France)	88	L´Imam Seydi	3	0	0	0	0	0	3 (3)	0 (0)
MF	(Hungary)	91	Péter Bogáti	1	0	0	0	0	1	1 (1)	1 (0)
			TOTALS	75	7	6	1	12	1	92 (75)	10 (7)

=== Overall ===
Games played	40 (30 OTP Bank Liga, 4 Hungarian Cup and 6 Hungarian League Cup)
Games won	13 (9 OTP Bank Liga, 2 Hungarian Cup and 2 Hungarian League Cup)
Games drawn	11 (11 OTP Bank Liga, 0 Hungarian Cup and 0 Hungarian League Cup)
Games lost	16 (10 OTP Bank Liga, 2 Hungarian Cup and 4 Hungarian League Cup)
Goals scored	53
Goals conceded	58
Goal difference	-5
Yellow cards	92
Red cards	10
Worst discipline	(Slovakia) Michal Hanek (7 (yellow card) , 3 (red card) )
Best result	7–0 (A) v Orosháza FC - Hungarian Cup - 26-09-2012
Worst result	0–4 (A) v Budapest Honvéd FC - Hungarian Cup - 21-11-2012
Most appearances	(Hungary) Gergő Gohér (36 appearances)
Top scorer	(Hungary) Tibor Tisza (18 goal)
Points	50/120 (41.67%)

Last updated: 2 June 2013

== Nemzeti Bajnokság I ==
=== Matches ===
27 July 2012 1	Diósgyőr	2–1	Újpest	Miskolc, Borsod-Abaúj-Zemplén County
19:00 CEST	Fernando 29'; Seydi 65'	(Report)	Vermes 42'	Stadium: DVTK Stadion; Attendance: 9,000; Referee: (Hungary) Ádám Németh

5 August 2012 2	Budapest Honvéd	2–1	Diósgyőr	Budapest, Pest County
18:30 CEST	Délczeg 17'; Diaby 63'	(Report)	Luque 34'	Stadium: Bozsik Stadion; Attendance: 3,000; Referee: (Hungary) Sándor Andó-Szabó

11 August 2012 3	Diósgyőr	1–0	Eger	Miskolc, Borsod-Abaúj-Zemplén County
19:00 CEST	Seydi 46'	(Report)		Stadium: DVTK Stadion; Attendance: 8,000; Referee: (Hungary) Balázs Böcskei

18 August 2012 4	Szombathely	0–0	Diósgyőr	Szombathely, Vas County
14:00 CEST		(Report)		Stadium: Rohonci úti Stadion; Attendance: 5,000; Referee: (Hungary) Viktor Kassai

25 August 2012 5	Diósgyőr	2–1	Siófok	Miskolc, Borsod-Abaúj-Zemplén County
20:45 CEST	Fernando 54'; Bacsa 67'	(Report)	Pál 21'	Stadium: DVTK Stadion; Attendance: 8,000; Referee: (Hungary) József Berger

1 September 2012 6	Diósgyőr	0–3	Győr	Miskolc, Borsod-Abaúj-Zemplén County
14:00 CEST		(Report)	Koltai 41', 57', 66'	Stadium: DVTK Stadion; Attendance: 8,000; Referee: (Hungary) Zsolt Szabó

15 September 2012 7	Videoton	0–0	Diósgyőr	Székesfehérvár, Fejér County
14:00 CEST		(Report)		Stadium: Stadion Sóstói; Attendance: 3,500; Referee: (Hungary) Gábor Oláh

21 September 2012 8	Diósgyőr	1–0	Paks	Miskolc, Borsod-Abaúj-Zemplén County
19:00 CEST	Bacsa 4'	(Report)		Stadium: DVTK Stadion; Attendance: 7,000; Referee: (Hungary) Tamás Bognár

30 September 2012 9	Ferencváros	2–0	Diósgyőr	Budapest, Pest County
16:30 CEST	Böde 70'; Perić 90+2'	(Report)		Stadium: Stadion Albert Flórián; Attendance: 5,000; Referee: (Hungary) Dániel Becséri

5 October 2012 10	Diósgyőr	2–1	MTK Budapest	Miskolc, Borsod-Abaúj-Zemplén County
19:00 CEST	Tisza 10'; Elek 66'	(Report)	Kanta 41' (pen.)	Stadium: DVTK Stadion; Attendance: 8,000; Referee: (Hungary) Ádám Farkas

21 October 2012 11	Debrecen	2–0	Diósgyőr	Debrecen, Hajdú-Bihar County
16:30 CEST	Yannick 24'; Coulibaly 77'	(Report)		Stadium: Stadion Oláh Gábor Út; Attendance: 9,500; Referee: (Hungary) Zsolt Szabó

27 October 2012 12	Diósgyőr	0–1	Kaposvár	Miskolc, Borsod-Abaúj-Zemplén County
16:00 CEST		(Report)	Horváth 87'	Stadium: DVTK Stadion; Attendance: 7,500; Referee: (Hungary) József Berger

2 November 2012 13	Kecskemét	1–1	Diósgyőr	Kecskemét, Bács-Kiskun County
17:00 CET	Savić 49'	(Report)	Tisza 25'	Stadium: Széktói Stadion; Attendance: 1,000; Referee: (Hungary) Sándor Andó-Szabó

9 November 2012 14	Diósgyőr	1–1	Pécs	Miskolc, Borsod-Abaúj-Zemplén County
17:00 CET	Luque 88' (pen.)	(Report)	Wittrédi 66'	Stadium: DVTK Stadion; Attendance: 6,000; Referee: (Hungary) Viktor Kassai

16 November 2012 15	Pápa	2–2	Diósgyőr	Pápa, Veszprém County
17:00 CET	Marić 61' (pen.), 90+4' (pen.)	(Report)	Tisza 25' (pen.), 30' (pen.)	Stadium: Stadion Várkerti; Attendance: 1,000; Referee: (Hungary) Zoltán Iványi

25 November 2012 16	Újpest	1–1	Diósgyőr	Budapest, Pest County
16:30 CET	Moraes 19'	(Report)	Tisza 66'	Stadium: Szusza Ferenc Stadium; Attendance: 3,612; Referee: (Hungary) Péter Solymosi

1 December 2012 17	Diósgyőr	3–1	Budapest Honvéd	Miskolc, Borsod-Abaúj-Zemplén County
18:30 CET	Silva 2'; Gohér 88'; Bacsa 90+3'	(Report)	Délczeg 82' (pen.)	Stadium: DVTK Stadion; Attendance: 6,000; Referee: (Hungary) István Vad

1 March 2013 18	Eger	0–1	Diósgyőr	Vác, Pest County
19:00 CET		(Report)	Tisza 17'	Stadium: Stadion Városi Vác; Attendance: 800; Referee: (Hungary) Viktor Kassai

9 March 2013 19	Diósgyőr	1–1	Szombathely	Miskolc, Borsod-Abaúj-Zemplén County
14:00 CET	Luque 22'	(Report)	Halmosi 12' (pen.)	Stadium: DVTK Stadion; Attendance: 4,597; Referee: (Hungary) Sándor Andó-Szabó

16 April 2013 20	Siófok	3–0	Diósgyőr	Siófok, Somogy County
16:00 CEST	Dajić 23'; Fehér 58'; Máté 74'	(Report)		Stadium: Révész Street Stadium; Attendance: 150; Referee: (Hungary) Tamás Bognár

31 March 2013 21	Győr	2–0	Diósgyőr	Győr, Győr-Moson-Sopron County
18:30 CEST	Varga 18'; Völgyi 68'	(Report)		Stadium: ETO Park; Attendance: 2,500; Referee: (Hungary) Péter Solymosi

7 April 2013 22	Diósgyőr	2–1	Videoton	Miskolc, Borsod-Abaúj-Zemplén County
18:30 CEST	Luque 10'; Fernando 22'	(Report)	Nemanja Nikolić (footballer born 1987) 80'	Stadium: DVTK Stadion; Attendance: 4,500; Referee: (Hungary) Zsolt Szabó

12 April 2013 23	Paks	1–0	Diósgyőr	Paks, Tolna County
19:00 CET	Tököli 11'	(Report)		Stadium: Stadion PSE; Attendance: 1,100; Referee: (Hungary) István Vad

21 April 2013 24	Diósgyőr	2–2	Ferencváros	Miskolc, Borsod-Abaúj-Zemplén County
16:30 CEST	Seydi 13', 73'	(Report)	Jenner 7'; Gyömbér 43'	Stadium: DVTK Stadion; Attendance: 10,000; Referee: (Hungary) Péter Solymosi

27 April 2013 25	MTK Budapest	2–0	Diósgyőr	Budapest, Pest County
14:00 CET	Vass 41'; Balajti 87'	(Report)		Stadium: Hidegkuti Nándor Stadium; Attendance: 1,600; Referee: (Hungary) István Vad

4 May 2013 26	Diósgyőr	3–3	Debrecen	Miskolc, Borsod-Abaúj-Zemplén County
14:00 CEST	Fernando 40'; Luque 77' (pen.); Gallardo 81'	(Report)	Kulcsár 23'; Coulibaly 62'; Bódi 66'	Stadium: DVTK Stadion; Attendance: 6,000; Referee: (Hungary) Viktor Kassai

10 May 2013 27	Kaposvár	1–1	Diósgyőr	Kaposvár, Somogy County
19:00 CEST	Vági 50' (o.g.)	(Report)	Fernando 31'	Stadium: Stadion Kaposvár Rákóczi; Attendance: 2,500; Referee: (Hungary) Tamás Bognár

19 May 2013 28	Diósgyőr	2–1	Kecskemét	Miskolc, Borsod-Abaúj-Zemplén County
16:30 CEST	Gohér 77'; Luque 82' (pen.)	(Report)	Rajczi 23'	Stadium: DVTK Stadion; Attendance: 3,500; Referee: (Hungary) Ádám Németh

27 May 2013 29	Pécs	2–1	Diósgyőr	Pécs, Baranya County
18:30 CEST	Grumić 1'; Szatmári 19'	(Report)	Rudolf 46'	Stadium: Stadion PMFC; Attendance: 1,000; Referee: (Hungary) József Berger

2 June 2013 30	Diósgyőr	1–1	Pápa	Miskolc, Borsod-Abaúj-Zemplén County
16:30 CEST	Kádár 90'	(Report)	Griffiths 83'	Stadium: DVTK Stadion; Attendance: 7,715; Referee: (Hungary) Sándor Andó-Szabó

=== Classification ===
Pos	Team	Pld	W	D	L	GF	GA	GD	Pts
8	Haladás	30	11	11	8	36	27	+9	44
9	Újpest	30	11	8	11	40	42	−2	41
10	Diósgyőr	30	9	11	10	31	39	−8	38
11	Kaposvári Rákóczi	30	10	7	13	35	38	−3	37
12	Pécs	30	10	7	13	33	44	−11	37

Source: mlsz.hu (in Hungarian)
Rules for classification: 1st points; 2nd overall wins; 3rd goal difference; 4th head-to-head points; 5th head-to-head goal difference; 6th head-to-head away goals scored; 7th fair-play points; 8th drawing of lots

=== Results summary ===
Overall								Home						Away					
Pld	W	D	L	GF	GA	GD	Pts	W	D	L	GF	GA	GD	W	D	L	GF	GA	GD
30	9	11	10	31	39	−8	38	8	5	2	23	18	+5	1	6	8	8	21	−13

Last updated: 2 June 2013.
Source: NB1

=== Results by round ===
Round	1	2	3	4	5	6	7	8	9	10	11	12	13	14	15	16	17	18	19	20	21	22	23	24	25	26	27	28	29	30
Ground	H	A	H	A	H	H	A	H	A	H	A	H	A	H	A	A	H	A	H	A	A	H	A	H	A	H	A	H	A	H
Result	W	L	W	D	W	L	D	W	L	W	L	L	D	D	D	D	W	W	D	L	L	W	L	D	L	D	D	W	L	D
Position	5	7	4	6	6	6	6	6	6	4	4	8	7	8	9	9	7	6	7	7	8	7	9	10	12	11	11	10	10	10

Updated to match(es) played on 2 June 2013. Source: Matches
A = Away; H = Home; W = Win; D = Draw; L = Loss

== Hungarian Cup ==
26 September 2012 Round 2	Orosháza	0–7	Diósgyőr	Orosháza, Békés County
15:30 CEST		(Report)	Vadász 6'; Seydi 39', 62', 63'; Gosztonyi 57'; Tisza 77'; Bacsa 78'	Stadium: Mátrai- Stadion; Attendance: 0 Referee: (Hungary) Roland Veizer

30 October 2012 Round 3	Velence	0–3	Diósgyőr	Velence, Fejér County
12:30 CET		(Report)	Luque 59' (pen.); Tisza 64', 90+1'	Stadium: Városi Sporttelep; Attendance: 500; Referee: (Hungary) Gábor Barna

21 November 2012 Round of 16 (1st leg)	Budapest Honvéd	4–0	Diósgyőr	Budapest, Pest County
18:00 CET	Ignjatović 67'; Baráth 83'; Vernes 88', 90+2' (pen.)	(Report)		Stadium: Bozsik Stadion; Attendance: 800; Referee: (Hungary) János Takács

28 November 2012 Round of 16 (2nd leg)	Diósgyőr	1–2 (1–6 agg.)	Budapest Honvéd	Miskolc, Borsod-Abaúj-Zemplén County
18:00	Tisza 45'	(Report)	Faggyas 18'; Vernes 54'	Stadium: DVTK Stadion; Attendance: 1,000; Referee: (Hungary) Gergely Szőts

== League Cup ==
=== Group stage ===
5 September 2012 1	Diósgyőr	3–2	Újpest	Miskolc, Borsod-Abaúj-Zemplén County
18:00 CEST	Tisza 26', 69', 79'	(Report)	Horváth 81', 90+1' (pen.)	Stadium: DVTK Stadion; Attendance: 1,400; Referee: (Hungary) Gergely Szőts

8 September 2012 2	Debrecen	5–2	Diósgyőr	Debrecen, Hajdú-Bihar County
16:00 CEST	Czvitkovics 40'; Sidibe 56', 86'; Szűcs 61'; Kulcsár 76'	(Report)	Tisza 36'; Bacsa 79'	Stadium: Stadion Oláh Gábor Út; Attendance: 1,500; Referee: (Hungary) Ádám Németh

10 October 2012 3	Diósgyőr	3–0	Eger	Miskolc, Borsod-Abaúj-Zemplén County
17:00 CEST	Gohér 48'; Tisza 62' (pen.), 82'	(Report)		Stadium: DVTK Stadion; Attendance: 1,200; Referee: (Hungary) Balázs Böcskei

13 October 2012 4	Eger	2–1	Diósgyőr	Eger, Heves County
14:00 CEST	Knakal 19'; Preklet 63'	(Report)	Tisza 29'	Stadium: Szentmarjay Tibor Városi Stadion; Attendance: 300; Referee: (Hungary) Zoltán J. Kovács

13 November 2012 5	Diósgyőr	0–1	Debrecen	Miskolc, Borsod-Abaúj-Zemplén County
17:00 CET		(Report)	Kulcsár 15'	Stadium: DVTK Stadion; Attendance: 1,000; Referee: (Hungary) József Erdős

5 December 2012 6	Újpest	3–2	Diósgyőr	Budapest, Pest County
15:00 CET	Kovács 35'; Mihajlović 37', 87'	(Report)	Nagy 59'; Tisza 90+2' (pen.)	Stadium: Szusza Ferenc Stadium; Attendance: 150; Referee: (Hungary) Dániel Becséri

==== Classification ====
Pos	Team	Pld	W	D	L	GF	GA	GD	Pts	Qualification
1	Debrecen	6	4	0	2	13	6	+7	12	Advance to knockout phase
2	Eger	6	4	0	2	13	9	+4	12	Advance to knockout phase
3	Diósgyőr	6	2	0	4	11	13	−2	6	
4	Újpest	6	2	0	4	9	18	−9	6	

Rules for classification: 1) points; 2) goal difference; 3) number of goals scored.
