= 2011–12 Diósgyőri VTK season =

Diósgyőri VTK
2011–12 season
- Chairman: (Hungary) Hunor Dudás
- Manager: (Hungary) Miklós Benczés (until 2 April 2012) (Hungary) Lázár Szentes
- NB 1: 7.
- Hungarian Cup: Round of 16
- Hungarian League Cup: Quarter-final
- Top goalscorer: League: (Spain) José Juan Luque (9); All: (Spain) José Juan Luque (11)
- Highest home attendance: 11,398 v Ferencváros (27 November 2011)
- Lowest home attendance: 1,500 v Debrecen (16 November 2011)
Home colours	Away colours

The 2011–12 season will be Diósgyőri VTK's 46th competitive season, 1st consecutive season in the OTP Bank Liga and 101st year in existence as a football club.

== First team squad ==
Note: Flags indicate national team as defined under FIFA eligibility rules; some limited exceptions apply. Players may hold more than one non-FIFA nationality.

No.	Pos.	Nation	Player
1	GK	CRO	Ivan Radoš
2	DF	SRB	Savo Raković
5	DF	CRO	Igor Gal
6	DF	HUN	Gergő Gohér
7	MF	ESP	Francisco Gallardo
8	MF	BOL	Vicente Arze
10	MF	CMR	Mohamadolu Abdouraman
11	MF	HUN	Péter Takács (on loan from Lombard-Pápa TFC)
12	GK	HUN	Balázs Farkas
13	GK	HUN	Bence Rakaczki
14	DF	HUN	Tamás Nagy
15	DF	HUN	András Vági
17	DF	HUN	Krisztián Budovinszky

No.	Pos.	Nation	Player
20	MF	ESP	Fernando
23	DF	HUN	Viktor Vadász
28	FW	HUN	Tibor Tisza
75	DF	BRA	Bernardo Frizoni
77	MF	ESP	José Juan Luque
79	MF	HUN	Ákos Lippai
83	GK	HUN	Norbert Tajti
88	FW	FRA	L´Imam Seydi
91	MF	HUN	Péter Bogáti
92	FW	HUN	Patrik Bacsa
95	MF	HUN	Martin Csirszki
98	MF	MAR	Youssef Sekour
99	MF	HUN	Attila Dobos

== Transfers ==
=== Summer ===
In: Note: Flags indicate national team as defined under FIFA eligibility rules; some limited exceptions apply. Players may hold more than one non-FIFA nationality.

No.	Pos.	Nation	Player
7	MF	ESP	Francisco Gallardo (from (Spain) SD Huesca)
9	FW	ESP	Enrique Carreño (from (Portugal) Associação Académica de Coimbra)
11	MF	HUN	Péter Takács (loan from Lombard-Pápa TFC)
12	GK	HUN	Balázs Farkas (from (Cyprus) Digenis Akritas Morphou)
25	GK	HUN	Tamás Giák (loan return from Bőcs KSC)
28	FW	HUN	Tibor Tisza (from Újpest FC)
88	FW	FRA	L´Imam Seydi (from (Slovakia) FK Bodva Moldava nad Bodvou)

Out: Note: Flags indicate national team as defined under FIFA eligibility rules; some limited exceptions apply. Players may hold more than one non-FIFA nationality.

No.	Pos.	Nation	Player
11	FW	HUN	Balázs Granát (to (Austria) UFC Purbach)
22	DF	HUN	Gábor Polényi (to Vasas SC)
25	GK	HUN	Tamás Giák (to Diósgyőri VTK II)
––	FW	HUN	Milán Faggyas (to (Austria) SV Mattersburg II)
––	GK	HUN	Norbert Tajti (loan return to Mezőkövesd-Zsóry SE)

=== Winter ===
In: Note: Flags indicate national team as defined under FIFA eligibility rules; some limited exceptions apply. Players may hold more than one non-FIFA nationality.

No.	Pos.	Nation	Player
15	DF	HUN	András Vági (from (Switzerland) FC Aarau)
20	MF	ESP	Fernando (from (Spain) Málaga CF)
27	MF	MAR	Youssef Sekour (from (Norway) Lillestrøm SK)
75	DF	BRA	Bernardo Frizoni (from (Slovakia) FK Bodva Moldava nad Bodvou)

Out: Note: Flags indicate national team as defined under FIFA eligibility rules; some limited exceptions apply. Players may hold more than one non-FIFA nationality.

No.	Pos.	Nation	Player
9	FW	ESP	Enrique Carreño (to (Spain) Real Zaragoza B)
16	MF	HUN	Tibor Halgas (on loan to Kazincbarcikai SC)
19	MF	HUN	Péter Szabó (on loan to Kazincbarcikai SC)
21	FW	CMR	George Menougong
24	FW	HUN	Szabolcs Pál (on loan to BFC Siófok)
37	MF	SVK	Richárd Illés (on loan to Kazincbarcikai SC)

- List of Hungarian football transfer summer 2011
- List of Hungarian football transfers winter 2011–12

== Statistics ==
=== Appearances and goals ===
Last updated on 27 May 2012.

No.	Pos	Nat	Player	Total		OTP Bank Liga		Hungarian Cup		League Cup	
No.	Pos	Nat	Player	Apps	Goals	Apps	Goals	Apps	Goals	Apps	Goals
1	GK	(Croatia) CRO	Ivan Radoš	25	-28	20	-25	1	0	4	-3
2	DF	(Serbia) SRB	Savo Raković	18	1	10	0	4	1	4	0
5	DF	(Croatia) CRO	Igor Gal	35	0	25	0	3	0	7	0
6	DF	(Hungary) HUN	Gergő Gohér	35	1	24	1	4	0	7	0
7	MF	(Spain) ESP	Francisco Gallardo	24	2	19	2	1	0	4	0
8	MF	(Bolivia) BOL	Vicente Arze	34	2	22	1	4	0	8	1
10	MF	(Cameroon) CMR	Mohamadolu Abdouraman	35	1	27	1	4	0	4	0
11	MF	(Hungary) HUN	Péter Takács	22	1	12	1	4	0	6	0
12	GK	(Hungary) HUN	Balázs Farkas	11	-15	5	-8	1	-1	5	-6
13	GK	(Hungary) HUN	Bence Rakaczki	7	-10	4	-5	2	-5	1	0
14	DF	(Hungary) HUN	Tamás Nagy	20	0	12	0	2	0	6	0
15	DF	(Hungary) HUN	András Vági	12	0	10	0	0	0	2	0
17	DF	(Hungary) HUN	Krisztián Budovinszky	23	7	19	5	1	0	3	2
20	MF	(Spain) ESP	Fernando	11	1	10	1	0	0	1	0
23	DF	(Hungary) HUN	Viktor Vadász	33	1	24	0	3	0	6	1
28	FW	(Hungary) HUN	Tibor Tisza	32	10	23	8	4	1	5	1
75	DF	(Brazil) BRA	Bernardo Frizoni	11	0	9	0	0	0	2	0
77	MF	(Spain) ESP	José Juan Luque	32	11	27	9	1	0	4	2
79	MF	(Hungary) HUN	Ákos Lippai	19	2	15	1	3	1	1	0
83	GK	(Hungary) HUN	Norbert Tajti	2	-3	2	-3	0	0	0	0
88	FW	(France) FRA	L´Imam Seydi	39	10	28	8	4	0	7	2
91	MF	(Hungary) HUN	Péter Bogáti	6	0	1	0	0	0	5	0
92	FW	(Hungary) HUN	Patrik Bacsa	14	2	10	2	1	0	3	0
95	MF	(Hungary) HUN	Martin Csirszki	2	0	1	0	0	0	1	0
98	MF	(Morocco) MAR	Youssef Sekour	13	1	11	1	0	0	2	0
99	MF	(Hungary) HUN	Attila Dobos	12	0	10	0	0	0	2	0
Youth players
18	MF	(Hungary) HUN	Máté Czégel	1	0	0	0	0	0	1	0
68	FW	(Hungary) HUN	Dávid Szabó	1	0	0	0	0	0	1	0
90	MF	(Hungary) HUN	Balázs Demkó	1	0	0	0	0	0	1	0
93	DF	(Hungary) HUN	Márk Czető	1	0	0	0	0	0	1	0
94	DF	(Hungary) HUN	Gábor Eperjesi	1	0	0	0	0	0	1	0
96	MF	(Hungary) HUN	Marcell Hornyák	1	0	0	0	0	0	1	0
Players currently out on loan
16	MF	(Hungary) HUN	Tibor Halgas	6	0	1	0	1	0	4	0
19	MF	(Hungary) HUN	Péter Szabó	1	0	0	0	0	0	1	0
24	FW	(Hungary) HUN	Szabolcs Pál	15	2	9	0	2	1	4	1
37	MF	(Slovakia) SVK	Richárd Illés	2	0	0	0	0	0	2	0
Players no longer at the club
9	FW	(Spain) ESP	Enrique Carreño	19	2	11	0	3	2	5	0
21	FW	(Cameroon) CMR	George Menougong	18	2	12	1	2	0	4	1

=== Top scorers ===
Includes all competitive matches. The list is sorted by shirt number when total goals are equal.

Last updated on 27 May 2012

Position	Nation	Number	Name	OTP Bank Liga	Hungarian Cup	League Cup	Total
1	(Spain)	77	José Juan Luque	9	0	2	11
2	(Hungary)	28	Tibor Tisza	8	1	1	10
3	(France) (Senegal)	88	L´Imam Seydi	8	0	2	10
4	(Hungary)	17	Krisztián Budovinszky	5	0	2	7
5	(Spain)	7	Francisco Gallardo	2	0	0	2
6	(Hungary)	92	Patrik Bacsa	2	0	0	2
7	(Hungary)	79	Ákos Lippai	1	1	0	2
8	(Bolivia)	8	Vicente Arze	1	0	1	2
9	(Cameroon)	21	George Menougong	1	0	1	2
10	(Spain)	9	Enrique Carreño	0	2	0	2
11	(Hungary)	24	Szabolcs Pál	0	1	1	2
12	(Hungary)	6	Gergő Gohér	1	0	0	1
13	(Cameroon)	10	Mohamadolu Abdouraman	1	0	0	1
14	(Spain)	20	Fernando	1	0	0	1
15	(Morocco) (France)	98	Youssef Sekour	1	0	0	1
16	(Hungary)	11	Péter Takács	1	0	0	1
17	(Serbia)	2	Savo Raković	0	1	0	1
18	(Hungary)	23	Viktor Vadász	0	0	1	1
/	/	/	Own Goals	0	0	1	1
			TOTALS	42	6	12	60

=== Disciplinary record ===
Includes all competitive matches. Players with 1 card or more included only.

Last updated on 27 May 2012

Position	Nation	Number	Name	OTP Bank Liga		Hungarian Cup		League Cup		Total (Hu Total)	
Position	Nation	Number	Name	Booked	Sent off (straight red)	Booked	Sent off (straight red)	Booked	Sent off (straight red)	Booked	Sent off (straight red)
GK	(Croatia)	1	Ivan Rados	3	1	0	0	0	0	3 (3)	1 (1)
DF	(Serbia)	2	Savo Raković	5	0	0	0	1	0	6 (5)	0 (0)
DF	(Croatia)	5	Igor Gal	1	0	1	0	3	0	5 (1)	0 (0)
DF	(Hungary)	6	Gergő Gohér	2	2	0	0	2	0	4 (2)	2 (2)
MF	(Spain)	7	Francisco Gallardo	2	1	0	0	0	0	2 (2)	1 (1)
MF	(Bolivia)	8	Vicente Arze	2	0	0	0	1	0	3 (2)	0 (0)
MF	(Cameroon)	10	Mohamadolu Abdouraman	9	0	1	0	0	0	10 (9)	0 (0)
MF	(Hungary)	11	Péter Takács	3	0	0	0	2	0	5 (3)	0 (0)
DF	(Hungary)	14	Tamás Nagy	5	0	0	0	1	0	6 (5)	0 (0)
DF	(Hungary)	15	András Vági	5	0	0	0	0	0	5 (5)	0 (0)
MF	(Hungary)	16	Tibor Halgas	0	0	0	0	1	0	1 (0)	0 (0)
DF	(Hungary)	17	Krisztián Budovinszky	4	0	0	0	0	0	4 (4)	0 (0)
MF	(Spain)	20	Fernando	1	0	0	0	0	0	1 (1)	0 (0)
FW	(Cameroon)	21	George Menougong	1	0	0	0	0	0	1 (1)	0 (0)
DF	(Hungary)	23	Viktor Vadász	3	0	1	0	1	1	5 (3)	1 (0)
FW	(Hungary)	24	Szabolcs Pál	0	1	0	0	0	0	0 (0)	1 (1)
FW	(Hungary)	28	Tibor Tisza	2	0	0	0	1	0	3 (2)	0 (0)
DF	(Brazil)	75	Bernardo Frizoni	3	0	0	0	0	0	3 (3)	0 (0)
MF	(Spain)	77	José Juan Luque	3	1	0	0	0	0	3 (3)	1 (1)
MF	(Hungary)	79	Ákos Lippai	0	0	1	0	1	0	2 (0)	0 (0)
FW	(France) (Senegal)	88	L´Imam Seydi	3	0	0	0	1	0	4 (3)	0 (0)
DF	(Hungary)	94	Gábor Eperjesi	0	0	0	0	1	0	1 (0)	0 (0)
MF	(Hungary)	96	Marcell Hornyák	0	0	0	0	1	0	1 (0)	0 (0)
MF	(Morocco) (France)	98	Youssef Sekour	1	1	0	0	0	0	1 (1)	1 (1)
MF	(Hungary)	99	Attila Dobos	1	0	0	0	0	0	1 (1)	0 (0)
			TOTALS	59	7	3	0	17	1	79 (59)	8 (7)

=== Overall ===
Games played	42 (30 OTP Bank Liga, 4 Hungarian Cup and 8 Hungarian League Cup)
Games won	17 (13 OTP Bank Liga, 1 Hungarian Cup and 3 Hungarian League Cup)
Games drawn	7 (4 OTP Bank Liga, 2 Hungarian Cup and 1 Hungarian League Cup)
Games lost	18 (13 OTP Bank Liga, 1 Hungarian Cup and 4 Hungarian League Cup)
Goals scored	60
Goals conceded	58
Goal difference	+2
Yellow cards	79
Red cards	8
Worst discipline	(Cameroon) Mohamadolu Abdouraman (10 (yellow card) , 0 (red card) )
Best result	4–0 (H) v Mezőkövesd-Zsóry SE - Ligakupa - 07-09-2011
Best result	4–0 (H) v Pécsi Mecsek FC - OTP Bank Liga - 15-10-2011
Worst result	0–5 (A) v Debreceni VSC - OTP Bank Liga - 02-10-2011
Most appearances	(France) (Senegal) L´Imam Seydi (39 appearances)
Top scorer	(Spain) José Juan Luque (11 goal)
Points	58/126 (46.03%)

Last updated: 27 May 2012

== Nemzeti Bajnokság I ==
=== Matches ===
16 July 2011 1	Diósgyőri VTK	4–1	Zalaegerszegi TE	Miskolc, Borsod-Abaúj-Zemplén County
17:30 CET (UTC+01)	Seydi 28' 45'; Luque 42'; Gohér 89'	(Report)	Varga 86'	Stadium: DVTK Stadion; Attendance: 7,000; Referee: (Hungary) István Vad

24 July 2011 2	Ferencvárosi TC	1–1	Diósgyőri VTK	Budapest, Pest County
18:00 CET (UTC+01)	Abdi 4'	(Report)	Luque 69'	Stadium: Stadion Albert Flórián; Attendance: 6,000; Referee: (Chile) Alvaro Garcia Miquel

31 July 2011 3	Diósgyőri VTK	1–2	Kecskeméti TE	Miskolc, Borsod-Abaúj-Zemplén County
16:00 CET (UTC+01)	Budovinszky 28'	(Report)	Tököli 30'; Dosso 89'	Stadium: DVTK Stadion; Attendance: 7,000; Referee: (Hungary) Ádám Farkas

6 August 2011 4	Videoton FC	2–0	Diósgyőri VTK	Székesfehérvár, Fejér County
20:00 CET (UTC+01)	Alves 21'; Brachi 89'	(Report)		Stadium: Stadion Sóstói; Attendance: 4,085; Referee: (Hungary) Péter Solymosi

13 August 2011 5	Diósgyőri VTK	2–0	Lombard-Pápa TFC	Miskolc, Borsod-Abaúj-Zemplén County
19:00 CET (UTC+01)	Budovinszky 47'; Seydi 78'	(Report)		Stadium: DVTK Stadion; Attendance: 6,000; Referee: (Hungary) Roland Veizer

21 August 2011 6	Újpest FC	1–1	Diósgyőri VTK	Budapest, Pest County
16:00 CET (UTC+01)	Kabát 51'	(Report)	Seydi 68'	Stadium: Szusza Ferenc Stadium; Attendance: 3,500; Referee: (Hungary) Zoltán J. Kovács

27 August 2011 7	Diósgyőri VTK	2–1	BFC Siófok	Miskolc, Borsod-Abaúj-Zemplén County
15:00 CET (UTC+01)	George 54'; Luque 80'	(Report)	Melczer 18' (pen.)	Stadium: DVTK Stadion; Attendance: 5,500; Referee: (Hungary) Balázs Böcskei

11 September 2011 8	Paksi SE	1–1	Diósgyőri VTK	Paks, Tolna County
16:00 CET (UTC+01)	Montvai 78' (pen.)	(Report)	Budovinszky 86'	Stadium: Stadion PSE; Attendance: 2,500; Referee: (Hungary) János Takács

16 September 2011 9	Diósgyőri VTK	2–1	Kaposvári Rákóczi FC	Miskolc, Borsod-Abaúj-Zemplén County
18:00 CET (UTC+01)	Lippai 11'; Arze 52'	(Report)	Perić 66'	Stadium: DVTK Stadion; Attendance: 5,000; Referee: (Hungary) Gábor Oláh

15 September 2011 10	Diósgyőri VTK	2–0	Győri ETO FC	Miskolc, Borsod-Abaúj-Zemplén County
18:00 CET (UTC+01)	Luque 16' (pen.); Seydi 60'	(Report)		Stadium: DVTK Stadion; Attendance: 10,500; Referee: (Hungary) Szabolcs Szilasi

2 October 2011 11	Debreceni VSC	5–0	Diósgyőri VTK	Debrecen, Hajdú-Bihar County
16:00 CET (UTC+01)	Bódi 22'; Coulibaly 24' 40'; Nikolić 65'; Kulcsár 67'	(Report)		Stadium: Stadion Oláh Gábor Út; Attendance: 10,000; Referee: (Hungary) Zoltán Iványi

15 October 2011 12	Diósgyőri VTK	4–0	Pécsi Mecsek FC	Miskolc, Borsod-Abaúj-Zemplén County
18:00 CET (UTC+01)	Budovinszky 26'; Tisza 36' 73'; Gallardo 51'	(Report)		Stadium: DVTK Stadion; Attendance: 9,000; Referee: (Hungary) Roland Veizer

21 October 2011 13	Budapest Honvéd FC	2–1	Diósgyőri VTK	Budapest, Pest County
18:00 CET (UTC+01)	Torghelle 22'; Abass 80'	(Report)	Gallardo 17'	Stadium: Bozsik Stadion; Attendance: 2,000; Referee: (Hungary) Zsolt Szabó

28 October 2011 14	Diósgyőri VTK	1–0	Szombathelyi Haladás	Miskolc, Borsod-Abaúj-Zemplén County
18:00 CET (UTC+01)	Luque 43'	(Report)		Stadium: DVTK Stadion; Attendance: 9,000; Referee: (Hungary) Balázs Böcskei

5 November 2011 15	Vasas SC	2–3	Diósgyőri VTK	Budapest, Pest County
15:00 CET (UTC+01)	Kulcsár 61'; Katona 86'	(Report)	Budovinszky 17'; Abdouraman 25'; Seydi 88'	Stadium: Stadion Rudolf Illovszky; Attendance: 4,500; Referee: (Hungary) Zoltán J. Kovács

19 November 2011 16	Zalaegerszegi TE	1–1	Diósgyőri VTK	Zalaegerszeg, Zala County
16:00 CET (UTC+01)	Kocsárdi 54' (pen.)	(Report)	Luque 43' (pen.)	Stadium: ZTE Arena; Attendance: 3,276; Referee: (Hungary) János Takács

27 November 2011 17	Diósgyőri VTK	2–3	Ferencvárosi TC	Miskolc, Borsod-Abaúj-Zemplén County
18:00 CET (UTC+01)	Seydi 16'; Luque 38'	(Report)	Somália 23' 58'; Pölöskey 52'	Stadium: DVTK Stadion; Attendance: 11,398; Referee: (Hungary) Péter Solymosi

4 March 2012 18	Kecskeméti TE	1–0	Diósgyőri VTK	Kecskemét, Bács-Kiskun County
16:00 CET (UTC+01)	Tököli 2' (pen.)	(Report)		Stadium: Széktói Stadion; Attendance: 6,000; Referee: (Hungary) Viktor Kassai

11 March 2012 19	Diósgyőri VTK	0–2	Videoton FC	Miskolc, Borsod-Abaúj-Zemplén County
18:00 CET (UTC+01)		(Report)	Vinícius 3'; Nikolić 73'	Stadium: DVTK Stadion; Attendance: 8,000; Referee: (Hungary) Zsolt Szabó

17 March 2012 20	Lombard-Pápa TFC	1–2	Diósgyőri VTK	Pápa, Veszprém County
17:00 CET (UTC+01)	Lovrencsics 88'	(Report)	Luque 27' (pen.); Tisza 76'	Stadium: Stadion Várkerti; Attendance: 1,200; Referee: (Hungary) József Berger

24 March 2012 21	Diósgyőri VTK	1–0	Újpest FC	Miskolc, Borsod-Abaúj-Zemplén County
17:30 CET (UTC+01)	Fernando 76'	(Report)		Stadium: DVTK Stadion; Attendance: 9,000; Referee: (Hungary) Péter Solymosi

30 March 2012 22	BFC Siófok	1–0	Diósgyőri VTK	Siófok, Somogy County
18:00 CET (UTC+01)	Simon 32'	(Report)		Stadium: Révész Street Stadium; Attendance: 2,000; Referee: (Hungary) Ádám Farkas

7 April 2012 23	Diósgyőri VTK	1–2	Paksi SE	Miskolc, Borsod-Abaúj-Zemplén County
18:00 CET (UTC+01)	Seydi 78'	(Report)	Éger 30'; Hrepka 48'	Stadium: DVTK Stadion; Attendance: 7,000; Referee: (Hungary) Viktor Kassai

13 April 2012 24	Kaposvári Rákóczi FC	3–2	Diósgyőri VTK	Kaposvár, Somogy County
18:00 CET (UTC+01)	Bebeto 60' (pen.) 86'; Grumić 90+3'	(Report)	Sekour 32'; Tisza 71'	Stadium: Stadion Kaposvár Rákóczi; Attendance: 4,000; Referee: (Hungary) Dániel Becséri

22 April 2012 25	Győri ETO FC	2–0	Diósgyőri VTK	Győr, Győr-Moson-Sopron County
16:45 CET (UTC+01)	Střeštík 82'; Ahjupera 88'	(Report)		Stadium: ETO Park; Attendance: 4,500; Referee: (Hungary) Ádám Farkas

29 April 2012 26	Diósgyőri VTK	0–2	Debreceni VSC	Miskolc, Borsod-Abaúj-Zemplén County
17:30 CET (UTC+01)		(Report)	Coulibaly 56' (pen.) 80'	Stadium: DVTK Stadion; Attendance: 9,000; Referee: (Hungary) Szabolcs Szilasi

4 May 2012 27	Pécsi Mecsek FC	1–2	Diósgyőri VTK	Pécs, Baranya County
18:00 CET (UTC+01)	Čaušić 10'	(Report)	Luque 2'; Tisza 45'	Stadium: Stadion PMFC; Attendance: 2,500; Referee: (Hungary) Ádám Németh

13 May 2012 28	Diósgyőri VTK	2–1	Budapest Honvéd FC	Miskolc, Borsod-Abaúj-Zemplén County
18:30 CET (UTC+01)	Tisza 24' 48'	(Report)	Délczeg 3'	Stadium: DVTK Stadion; Attendance: 9,000; Referee: (Hungary) Tamás Bognár

20 May 2012 29	Szombathelyi Haladás	2–1	Diósgyőri VTK	Szombathely, Vas County
15:00 CET (UTC+01)	Nagy 20'; Halmosi 89'	(Report)	Takács 3'	Stadium: Rohonci Street Stadium; Attendance: 4,000; Referee: (Hungary) Péter Solymosi

26 May 2012 30	Diósgyőri VTK	3–2	Vasas SC	Miskolc, Borsod-Abaúj-Zemplén County
15:00 CET (UTC+01)	Bacsa 3' 17'; Tisza 27'	(Report)	Dajić 20'; Tóth 36'	Stadium: DVTK Stadion; Attendance: 6,500; Referee: (Hungary) Sándor Andó-Szabó

=== Classification ===
Pos	Team	Pld	W	D	L	GF	GA	GD	Pts
5	Kecskemét	30	13	6	11	48	38	+10	45
6	Paks	30	12	9	9	47	51	−4	45
7	Diósgyőr	30	13	4	13	42	43	−1	43
8	Haladás	30	9	11	10	39	37	+2	38
9	Siófok	30	9	9	12	30	41	−11	36

Source: MLSZ (in Hungarian)
Rules for classification: 1st points; 2nd overall wins; 3rd goal difference; 4th goals scored

=== Results summary ===
Overall								Home						Away					
Pld	W	D	L	GF	GA	GD	Pts	W	D	L	GF	GA	GD	W	D	L	GF	GA	GD
30	13	4	13	42	43	−1	43	10	0	5	27	17	+10	3	4	8	15	26	−11

Last updated: 27 May 2012.
Source: NB1

=== Results by round ===
Round	1	2	3	4	5	6	7	8	9	10	11	12	13	14	15	16	17	18	19	20	21	22	23	24	25	26	27	28	29	30
Ground	H	A	H	A	H	A	H	A	H	H	A	H	A	H	A	A	H	A	H	A	H	A	H	A	A	H	A	H	A	H
Result	W	D	L	L	W	D	W	D	W	W	L	W	L	W	W	D	L	L	L	W	W	L	L	L	L	L	W	W	L	W
Position	2	6	7	9	9	8	6	8	5	4	6	3	5	4	3	5	5	7	7	6	5	5	6	6	7	7	7	7	7	7

Updated to match(es) played on 27 May 2012. Source: Matches
A = Away; H = Home; W = Win; D = Draw; L = Loss

== Hungarian Cup ==
21 September 2011 3	Egri FC	0–0 (a.e.t.) (2–4 p)	Diósgyőri VTK	Eger, Heves County
15:30		(Report)		Stadium: Szentmarjay Stadion; Attendance: 1,000; Referee: (Hungary) Balázs Böcskei
	Penalties
	Katona (penalty missed); Romhányi (penalty scored); Horváth (penalty scored); Bíró (penalty missed)		Pál (penalty scored); Raković (penalty scored); Tisza (penalty scored); Takács (penalty scored)

25 October 2011 4	BKV Előre SC	1–4	Diósgyőri VTK	Budapest, Pest County
14:00	Baranyai 84' (pen.)	(Report)	Carreño 25' 89'; Pál 34'; Raković 72'	Stadium: Sport utcai stadion Attendance: 300; Referee: (Hungary) Krisztián Pánczél

=== Round of 16 ===
30 November 2011 1st leg	Diósgyőri VTK	1–1	Győri ETO FC	Miskolc, Borsod-Abaúj-Zemplén County
18:00	Lippai 34'	(Report)	Ahjupera 36'	Stadium: DVTK Stadion; Attendance: 5,500; Referee: (Hungary) Sándor Andó-Szabó

3 December 2011 2nd leg	Győri ETO FC	4–1 (5–2 agg.)	Diósgyőri VTK	Győr, Győr-Moson-Sopron County
15:00	Dudás 14' 36'; Fehér 32'; Trajković 38'	(Report)	Tisza 62'	Stadium: ETO Park; Attendance: 1,500; Referee: (Hungary) Viktor Kassai

== League Cup ==
=== Group stage ===
31 August 2011 1	Debreceni VSC	2–1	Diósgyőri VTK	Debrecen, Hajdú-Bihar County
17:00	Bouadla 43'; Alisic 58'	(Report)	Máté 73' (o.g.)	Stadium: Stadion Oláh Gábor Út; Attendance: 1,200; Referee: (Hungary) Ferenc Karakó

7 September 2011 2	Diósgyőri VTK	4–0	Mezőkövesd-Zsóry SE	Miskolc, Borsod-Abaúj-Zemplén County
18:00	Luque 22'; Vadász 28'; Arze 35'; Budovinszky 58'	(Report)		Stadium: DVTK Stadion; Attendance: 3,400; Referee: (Hungary) Zsolt Szabó

6 October 2011 3	Diósgyőri VTK	3–0	Vasas SC	Miskolc, Borsod-Abaúj-Zemplén County
18:00	Tisza 59'; Budovinszky 71'; George 89'	(Report)		Stadium: DVTK Stadion; Attendance: 2,500; Referee: (Hungary) Dániel Becséri

12 October 2011 4	Vasas SC	1–1	Diósgyőri VTK	Budapest, Pest County
14:00	Beliczky 12'	(Report)	Seydi 40'	Stadium: Stadion Rudolf Illovszky; Attendance: 200; Referee: (Hungary) Krisztián Pánczél

9 November 2011 5	Mezőkövesd-Zsóry SE	1–3	Diósgyőri VTK	Mezőkövesd, Borsod-Abaúj-Zemplén County
13:30	Palásthy 78'	(Report)	Luque 45'; Seydi 52'; Pál 90'	Stadium: Mezőkövesdi Városi Stadion; Attendance: 500; Referee: (Hungary) Tamás Berényi

16 November 2011 6	Diósgyőri VTK	0–1	Debreceni VSC	Miskolc, Borsod-Abaúj-Zemplén County
16:30		(Report)	Alisic 40'	Stadium: DVTK Stadion; Attendance: 1,500; Referee: (Hungary) Ádám Németh

==== Classification ====
Pos	Team	Pld	W	D	L	GF	GA	GD	Pts	Qualification
1	Debrecen	6	5	1	0	18	8	+10	16	Advance to knockout phase
2	Diósgyőr	6	3	1	2	12	5	+7	10	Advance to knockout phase
3	Mezőkövesd-Zsóry	6	1	1	4	7	18	−11	4	
4	Vasas	6	0	3	3	12	18	−6	3	

Rules for classification: 1) points; 2) goal difference; 3) number of goals scored.

=== Quarter-final ===
22 February 2012 1st leg	Diósgyőri VTK	0–2	Videoton FC	Miskolc, Borsod-Abaúj-Zemplén County
18:00		(Report)	Torghelle 25'; Nikolić 90+2'	Stadium: DVTK Stadion; Attendance: 4,000; Referee: (Hungary) Zoltán Iványi

7 March 2012 2nd leg	Videoton FC	2–0 (4–0 agg.)	Diósgyőri VTK	Székesfehérvár, Fejér County
16:00	Brandão 31'; Mitrović 51' (pen.)	(Report)		Stadium: Sóstói Stadion; Attendance: 2,000; Referee: (Hungary) Balázs Berke

== Pre Season (Winter) ==
21 January 2012	Diósgyőri VTK	1–0	Kazincbarcikai SC	Miskolc, Borsod-Abaúj-Zemplén County
	Bacsa 89'	(Report)		Stadium: DVTK Stadion; Attendance: 1,500; Referee: (Hungary) Róbert Nagy

27 January 2012	Diósgyőri VTK	3–0	MŠK Rimavská Sobota (Slovakia)	Miskolc, Borsod-Abaúj-Zemplén County
	Tisza 58' 74' 88'	(Report)		Stadium: DVTK Stadion

28 January 2012	Mezőkövesd-Zsóry SE	2–3	Diósgyőri VTK	Mezőkövesd, Borsod-Abaúj-Zemplén County
	Vámosi; Olasz	(Report)	Dobos; Vadász; Bogáti	Stadium: Mezőkövesdi Városi Stadion; Attendance: 200; Referee: (Hungary) Demeter

31 January 2012	MTK Budapest FC	2–1	Diósgyőri VTK	Budafok, Pest County
	Frank 85' 90'	(Report)	Luque 67' (pen.)	Stadium: Promontor utcai Stadion; Attendance: 100; Referee: (Hungary) Antal

1 February 2012	Diósgyőri VTK	1–0	Mezőkövesd-Zsóry SE	Miskolc, Borsod-Abaúj-Zemplén County
	Arze 86'	(Report)		Stadium: DVTK Stadion; Attendance: 200; Referee: (Hungary) Róbert Nagy

3 February 2012	Diósgyőri VTK	5–2	Balmazújvárosi FC	Miskolc, Borsod-Abaúj-Zemplén County
	Seydi; Arze; Bacsa; George; Vadász	(Report)		Stadium: DVTK Stadion

8 February 2012	Diósgyőri VTK	1–1	KS Cracovia (Poland)	Belek, Turkey
	Gallardo 85'	(Report)

9 February 2012	Diósgyőri VTK	1–0	FK Shkëndija (North Macedonia)	Belek, Turkey
	Bogáti 7'	(Report)

11 February 2012	Diósgyőri VTK	0–2	FK Vojvodina (Serbia)	Belek, Turkey
		(Report)	Appiah 32' (pen.)

12 February 2012	Diósgyőri VTK	3–2	PFC Botev Plovdiv (Bulgaria)	Belek, Turkey
	Arze 7' 90+2'; Seydi 74'	(Report)

15 February 2012	Diósgyőri VTK	2–2	FC KAMAZ Naberezhnye Chelny (Russia)	Belek, Turkey
	Seydi; Luque pen.'	(Report)

16 February 2012	Diósgyőri VTK	4–4	CS Concordia Chiajna (Romania)	Belek, Turkey
	Seydi; Fernando; Lippai	(Report)	Rocha; Filip; Munteanu pen.'
