= 2014–15 Diósgyőri VTK season =

Diósgyőri VTK
2014–15 season
- Chairman: (Hungary) Hunor Dudás
- Manager: (Serbia) Tomislav Sivić
Home colours	Away colours

The 2014–15 season will be Diósgyőri VTK's 49th competitive season, 4th consecutive season in the OTP Bank Liga and 104th year in existence as a football club.

== First team squad ==
Note: Flags indicate national team as defined under FIFA eligibility rules; some limited exceptions apply. Players may hold more than one non-FIFA nationality.

No.	Pos.	Nation	Player
3	DF	BIH	Senad Husić
4	DF	HUN	Tamás Kádár
5	DF	BRA	William Alves
7	DF	SRB	Dražen Okuka
9	FW	HUN	Patrik Bacsa
10	MF	HUN	István Bognár
11	FW	HUN	Tamás Takács
14	DF	HUN	András Debreceni
17	MF	HUN	Tamás Egerszegi
18	MF	HUN	András Gosztonyi
19	FW	SRB	Miroslav Grumić
21	MF	HUN	Gábor Bori

No.	Pos.	Nation	Player
22	GK	CRO	Ivan Radoš
23	DF	HUN	Vilmos Szalai
25	MF	HUN	Ákos Elek
27	MF	NED	Julian Jenner
29	DF	HUN	Milán Németh
31	MF	HUN	Dávid Barczi
49	MF	HUN	Martin Csirszki
50	FW	CIV	Georges Griffiths
89	MF	SRB	Lazar Marjanović
94	DF	HUN	Gábor Eperjesi
99	GK	HUN	Botond Antal

== Transfers ==
=== Summer ===
In: Note: Flags indicate national team as defined under FIFA eligibility rules; some limited exceptions apply. Players may hold more than one non-FIFA nationality.

No.	Pos.	Nation	Player
7	DF	SRB	Dražen Okuka (from Kaposvár)
8	MF	KOR	Kim Ho-Young (from (Montenegro) Mornar)
10	MF	HUN	István Bognár (from Mezőkövesd)
11	FW	HUN	Tamás Takács (from Szigetszentmiklós)
21	MF	HUN	Gábor Bori (from Paks)
23	DF	HUN	Vilmos Szalai (from Mezőkövesd)
27	MF	NED	Julian Jenner (from Ferencváros)
29	DF	HUN	Milán Németh (from Pápa)
50	FW	CIV	Georges Griffiths (from (Austria) SV Ried)
89	GK	SRB	Nenad Rajić (from (Bosnia and Herzegovina) Leotar)
99	GK	HUN	Botond Antal (from Kaposvár)

Out: Note: Flags indicate national team as defined under FIFA eligibility rules; some limited exceptions apply. Players may hold more than one non-FIFA nationality.

No.	Pos.	Nation	Player
6	DF	HUN	Gergő Gohér (to Puskás)
10	MF	CMR	Mohamadolu Abdouraman (to Nyíregyháza)
11	MF	SRB	Zoran Kostić (to Nyíregyháza)
15	DF	HUN	András Vági (to Paks)
19	FW	HUN	Marcell Hornyák (to Rakamaz)
20	MF	HUN	Márk Nikházi (loan to Dunaújváros)
23	DF	HUN	Viktor Vadász (to Újpest)
55	GK	HUN	Vince Gelei (to Csákvár)
88	FW	ECU	Augusto Batioja (to (Serbia) Radnički Niš)
89	GK	SRB	Nenad Rajić
99	FW	HUN	Márkó Futács (loan return to (England) Leicester City)
—	GK	HUN	Péter Herceg (to Mezőkövesd)

=== Winter ===
In: Note: Flags indicate national team as defined under FIFA eligibility rules; some limited exceptions apply. Players may hold more than one non-FIFA nationality.

No.	Pos.	Nation	Player
—	MF	SRB	Miloš Krstić (from (Cyprus) Nea Salamis)
—	MF	HUN	Vladimir Koman (from (Russia) Krasnodar)
—	DF	HUN	Gábor Kovács (from Paks)

Out: Note: Flags indicate national team as defined under FIFA eligibility rules; some limited exceptions apply. Players may hold more than one non-FIFA nationality.

No.	Pos.	Nation	Player
4	DF	HUN	Tamás Kádár (to (Poland) Lech Poznań)
10	MF	HUN	Balázs Szabó (loan to Sopron)
14	DF	HUN	András Debreceni (to Vasas)
21	MF	HUN	Gábor Bori (loan to Vasas)
25	MF	HUN	Ákos Elek (to (China) Changchun Yatai)
49	MF	HUN	Martin Csirszki (loan to Szolnok)
89	GK	SRB	Nenad Rajić

- List of Hungarian football transfers summer 2014
- List of Hungarian football transfers winter 2014–15

== Statistics ==
=== Appearances and goals ===
Last updated on 7 December 2014.

No.	Pos	Nat	Player	Total		OTP Bank Liga		Europa League		Hungarian Cup		League Cup	
No.	Pos	Nat	Player	Apps	Goals	Apps	Goals	Apps	Goals	Apps	Goals	Apps	Goals
3	DF	(Bosnia and Herzegovina) BIH	Senad Husić	26	2	15	1	5	1	4	0	2	0
4	DF	(Hungary) HUN	Tamás Kádár	23	0	16	0	6	0	0	0	1	0
5	DF	(Brazil) BRA	William Alves	21	0	13	0	3	0	2	0	3	0
7	DF	(Serbia) SRB	Dražen Okuka	26	0	16	0	5	0	2	0	3	0
9	FW	(Hungary) HUN	Patrik Bacsa	27	8	16	3	5	2	3	1	3	2
10	MF	(Hungary) HUN	István Bognár	23	3	13	1	4	0	3	1	3	1
11	FW	(Hungary) HUN	Tamás Takács	23	10	15	3	1	0	4	3	3	4
14	DF	(Hungary) HUN	András Debreceni	16	0	3	0	5	0	4	0	4	0
17	MF	(Hungary) HUN	Tamás Egerszegi	23	0	13	0	4	0	3	0	3	0
18	MF	(Hungary) HUN	András Gosztonyi	24	4	14	2	6	1	2	1	2	0
19	FW	(Serbia) SRB	Miroslav Grumić	26	8	15	5	5	1	3	2	3	0
21	MF	(Hungary) HUN	Gábor Bori	19	0	7	0	4	0	3	0	5	0
22	GK	(Croatia) CRO	Ivan Radoš	11	-13	5	-6	3	-6	2	0	1	-1
23	DF	(Hungary) HUN	Vilmos Szalai	10	0	4	0	0	0	2	0	4	0
25	MF	(Hungary) HUN	Ákos Elek	23	2	15	1	5	1	2	0	1	0
27	MF	(Netherlands) NED	Julian Jenner	5	0	3	0	0	0	0	0	2	0
29	DF	(Hungary) HUN	Milán Németh	9	2	4	1	4	1	1	0	0	0
31	MF	(Hungary) HUN	Dávid Barczi	18	3	9	0	3	2	3	0	3	1
49	MF	(Hungary) HUN	Martin Csirszki	8	1	0	0	1	0	2	0	5	1
50	FW	(Ivory Coast) CIV	Georges Griffiths	18	8	11	5	0	0	3	3	4	0
89	MF	(Serbia) SRB	Lazar Marjanović	22	5	12	3	5	1	3	1	2	0
94	DF	(Hungary) HUN	Gábor Eperjesi	6	0	2	0	1	0	1	0	2	0
99	GK	(Hungary) HUN	Botond Antal	22	-25	13	-14	4	-6	2	-3	3	-2
Youth players:
1	GK	(Hungary) HUN	Levente Bősz	1	0	0	0	0	0	0	0	1	0
2	DF	(Hungary) HUN	Dominik Bodnár	3	0	0	0	0	0	0	0	3	0
3	MF	(Hungary) HUN	Marcell Mahalek	2	1	0	0	0	0	0	0	2	1
4	DF	(Hungary) HUN	Milán Csicsvári	2	0	0	0	0	0	0	0	2	0
5	MF	(Hungary) HUN	Bálint Oláh	1	0	0	0	0	0	0	0	1	0
7	MF	(Hungary) HUN	István Timkó	1	0	0	0	0	0	0	0	1	0
8	MF	(Hungary) HUN	Kristóf Kövér	3	0	0	0	0	0	0	0	3	0
10	MF	(Hungary) HUN	Balázs Szabó	4	0	0	0	0	0	1	0	3	0
11	FW	(Hungary) HUN	Alex Balogh	1	0	0	0	0	0	0	0	1	0
11	FW	(Hungary) HUN	Mátyás Gresó	2	0	0	0	0	0	0	0	2	0
12	MF	(Hungary) HUN	Gergő Sipos	2	0	0	0	0	0	0	0	2	0
13	MF	(Hungary) HUN	Gergő Germán	1	0	0	0	0	0	0	0	1	0
15	FW	(Hungary) HUN	Gabriel Boros	1	0	0	0	0	0	0	0	1	0
18	DF	(Hungary) HUN	Milán Nemes	2	0	0	0	0	0	0	0	2	0
19	DF	(Hungary) HUN	Máté Hutter	1	0	0	0	0	0	0	0	1	0
35	GK	(Hungary) HUN	Balázs Egyed	1	-4	0	0	0	0	0	0	1	-4
45	FW	(Hungary) HUN	Zsolt Icsó	4	1	0	0	0	0	0	0	4	1
Out to loan:
20	MF	(Hungary) HUN	Márk Nikházi	7	0	4	0	3	0	0	0	0	0
Players no longer at the club:
89	GK	(Serbia) SRB	Nenad Rajić	2	-1	0	0	0	0	0	0	2	-1

=== Top scorers ===
Includes all competitive matches. The list is sorted by shirt number when total goals are equal.

Last updated on 7 December 2014

Position	Nation	Number	Name	OTP Bank Liga	Hungarian Cup	Europa League	League Cup	Total
1	(Hungary)	11	Tamás Takács	3	0	3	4	10
2	(Serbia)	19	Miroslav Grumić	5	1	2	0	8
3	(Ivory Coast)	50	Georges Griffiths	5	0	3	0	8
4	(Hungary)	9	Patrik Bacsa	3	2	1	2	8
5	(Serbia)	89	Lazar Marjanović	3	1	1	0	5
6	(Hungary)	18	András Gosztonyi	2	1	1	0	4
7	(Hungary)	10	István Bognár	1	0	1	1	3
8	(Hungary)	31	Dávid Barczi	0	2	0	1	3
9	(Bosnia and Herzegovina)	3	Senad Husić	1	1	0	0	2
10	(Hungary)	29	Milán Németh	1	1	0	0	2
11	(Hungary)	25	Ákos Elek	1	1	0	0	2
12	(Hungary)	21	Gábor Bori	0	0	1	0	1
13	(Hungary)	3	Marcell Mahalek	0	0	0	1	1
14	(Hungary)	45	Zsolt Icsó	0	0	0	1	1
15	(Hungary)	49	Martin Csirszki	0	0	0	1	1
/	/	/	Own Goals	2	0	0	1	3
			TOTALS	27	10	13	12	62

=== Disciplinary record ===
Includes all competitive matches. Players with 1 card or more included only.

Last updated on 7 December 2014

Position	Nation	Number	Name	OTP Bank Liga		Europa League		Hungarian Cup		League Cup		Total (Hu Total)	
Position	Nation	Number	Name	Booked	Sent off (straight red)	Booked	Sent off (straight red)	Booked	Sent off (straight red)	Booked	Sent off (straight red)	Booked	Sent off (straight red)
DF	(Bosnia and Herzegovina)	3	Senad Husić	2	0	0	0	0	0	0	0	2 (2)	0 (0)
DF	(Hungary)	4	Tamás Kádár	1	0	2	0	0	0	1	0	4 (1)	0 (0)
DF	(Brazil)	5	William Alves	2	1	0	0	0	0	1	0	3 (2)	1 (1)
DF	(Serbia)	7	Dražen Okuka	5	0	3	0	0	0	0	0	8 (5)	0 (0)
MF	(Hungary)	7	István Timkó	0	0	0	0	0	0	1	0	1 (0)	0 (0)
MF	(Hungary)	8	Kristóf Kövér	0	0	0	0	0	0	1	0	1 (0)	0 (0)
FW	(Hungary)	9	Patrik Bacsa	2	0	1	0	0	0	0	0	3 (2)	0 (0)
MF	(Hungary)	10	István Bognár	0	0	0	0	0	0	1	0	1 (0)	0 (0)
FW	(Hungary)	11	Tamás Takács	2	0	0	0	0	0	0	0	2 (2)	0 (0)
DF	(Hungary)	14	András Debreceni	1	1	0	0	0	0	1	0	2 (1)	1 (1)
MF	(Hungary)	17	Tamás Egerszegi	3	1	1	0	0	0	0	0	4 (3)	1 (1)
MF	(Hungary)	18	András Gosztonyi	4	0	2	0	2	0	0	0	8 (4)	0 (0)
FW	(Serbia)	19	Miroslav Grumić	2	0	0	0	1	0	0	0	3 (2)	0 (0)
MF	(Hungary)	20	Márk Nikházi	1	0	0	0	0	0	0	0	1 (1)	0 (0)
MF	(Hungary)	21	Gábor Bori	1	0	1	0	1	0	1	0	4 (1)	0 (0)
GK	(Croatia)	22	Ivan Radoš	0	1	0	0	0	0	0	0	0 (0)	1 (1)
DF	(Hungary)	23	Vilmos Szalai	1	0	0	0	2	0	0	0	3 (1)	0 (0)
MF	(Hungary)	25	Ákos Elek	3	0	0	0	1	0	0	0	4 (3)	0 (0)
MF	(Netherlands)	27	Julian Jenner	1	0	0	0	0	0	0	0	1 (1)	0 (0)
DF	(Hungary)	29	Milán Németh	1	0	0	0	0	0	0	0	1 (1)	0 (0)
MF	(Hungary)	31	Dávid Barczi	0	0	0	0	1	0	0	0	1 (0)	0 (0)
MF	(Ivory Coast)	50	Georges Griffiths	1	0	0	0	0	0	0	0	1 (1)	0 (0)
MF	(Serbia)	89	Lazar Marjanović	2	0	0	0	2	0	0	1	4 (2)	1 (0)
DF	(Hungary)	94	Gábor Eperjesi	0	0	0	0	0	0	1	0	1 (0)	0 (0)
GK	(Hungary)	99	Botond Antal	2	1	0	0	0	0	0	0	2 (2)	1 (1)
			TOTALS	37	5	10	0	10	0	8	1	65 (37)	6 (5)

=== Overall ===
Games played	33 (17 OTP Bank Liga, 6 Europa League, 4 Hungarian Cup and 6 Hungarian League Cup)
Games won	18 (9 OTP Bank Liga, 3 Europa League, 3 Hungarian Cup and 3 Hungarian League Cup)
Games drawn	6 (5 OTP Bank Liga, 0 Europa League, 0 Hungarian Cup and 1 Hungarian League Cup)
Games lost	9 (3 OTP Bank Liga, 3 Europa League, 1 Hungarian Cup and 2 Hungarian League Cup)
Goals scored	62
Goals conceded	42
Goal difference	+20
Yellow cards	65
Red cards	6
Worst discipline	(Serbia) Dražen Okuka (8 (yellow card) , 0 (red card) )
Worst discipline	(Hungary) András Gosztonyi (8 (yellow card) , 0 (red card) )
Best result	4–0 (A) v Vasas - Hungarian Cup - 13-08-2014
Best result	4–0 (A) v Iváncsa - Hungarian Cup - 10-09-2014
Worst result	1–5 (H) v Krasnodar - Europa League - 31-07-2014
Most appearances	(Hungary) Patrik Bacsa (27 appearances)
Top scorer	(Hungary) Tamás Takács (10 goals)
Points	60/99 (60.61%)

Last updated: 7 December 2014

== Nemzeti Bajnokság I ==
=== Matches ===
27 July 2014 1	Diósgyőr	2–1	Puskás	Miskolc, Borsod-Abaúj-Zemplén County
18:30 CEST	Husić 50'; Bacsa 72'	Report	Lencse 90+2'	Stadium: DVTK Stadion; Attendance: 4,314; Referee: (Hungary) Tamás Bognár

3 August 2014 2	Újpest	1–1	Diósgyőr	Budapest, Pest County
20:30 CEST	Suljić 61'	Report	Grumić 53'	Stadium: Szusza Ferenc Stadium; Attendance: 3,605; Referee: (Hungary) István Vad

10 August 2014 3	Diósgyőr	3–0	Haladás	Miskolc, Borsod-Abaúj-Zemplén County
18:30 CEST	Jagodics 68' (o.g.); Németh 82'; Fehér 90' (o.g.)	Report		Stadium: DVTK Stadion; Attendance: 5,156; Referee: (Hungary) Ádám Németh

17 August 2014 4	Diósgyőr	2–1	Kecskemét	Miskolc, Borsod-Abaúj-Zemplén County
20:30 CEST	Grumić 16'; Takács 90+3'	Report	Vukasović 57'	Stadium: DVTK Stadion; Attendance: 5,042; Referee: (Hungary) Tamás Bognár

24 August 2014 5	Pécs	1–2	Diósgyőr	Pécs, Baranya County
18:30 CEST	Wittrédi 90+4' (pen.)	Report	Gosztonyi 14', 21'	Stadium: Stadion PMFC; Attendance: 1,223; Referee: (Hungary) Zsolt Szabó

31 August 2014 6	Diósgyőr	1–1	Debrecen	Miskolc, Borsod-Abaúj-Zemplén County
20:30 CEST	Griffiths 84'	Report	Seydi 31'	Stadium: DVTK Stadion; Attendance: 5,662; Referee: (Hungary) István Vad

22 October 2014 7	Paks	3–1	Diósgyőr	Paks, Tolna County
18:00 CEST	Gévay 85'; Bartha 88', 90+2'	Report	Bacsa 56'	Stadium: Stadion PSE; Attendance: 810; Referee: (Hungary) Csaba Pintér

20 September 2014 8	Diósgyőr	2–1	Honvéd	Diósgyőr, Borsod-Abaúj-Zemplén County
16:30 CEST	Bognár 58' (pen.); Takács 86'	Report	Hidi 45+1'	Stadium: DVTK Stadion; Attendance: 4,806; Referee: (Hungary) Zsolt Szabó

28 September 2014 9	Videoton	2–1	Diósgyőr	Székesfehérvár, Fejér County
16:30 CEST	Nikolić 54'; Alves 86' (o.g.)	Report	Grumić 81'	Stadium: Sóstói Stadion; Attendance: 5,522; Referee: (Hungary) Tamás Bognár

4 October 2014 10	Diósgyőr	2–1	Ferencváros	Diósgyőr, Borsod-Abaúj-Zemplén County
14:00 CEST	Grumić 6'; Takács 60'	Report	Gera 8'	Stadium: DVTK Stadion; Attendance: 8,626; Referee: (Hungary) Zoltán Iványi

18 October 2014 11	Pápa	0–0	Diósgyőr	Pápa, Veszprém County
14:00 CEST		Report		Stadium: Perutz Stadion; Attendance: 955; Referee: (Hungary) István Vad

25 October 2014 12	Diósgyőr	3–3	Dunaújváros	Diósgyőr, Borsod-Abaúj-Zemplén County
18:00 CEST	Bacsa 47'; Grumić 63'; Marjanović 89'	Report	Böőr 16' (pen.), 25'; Nikházi 25'	Stadium: DVTK Stadion; Attendance: 3,170; Referee: (Hungary) Sándor Andó-Szabó

1 November 2014 13	Győr	1–1	Diósgyőr	Győr, Győr-Moson-Sopron County
14:00 CET	Priskin 71'	Report	Marjanović 76'	Stadium: ETO Park; Attendance: 1,978; Referee: (Hungary) József Erdős

9 November 2014 14	Diósgyőr	2–1	Nyíregyháza	Diósgyőr, Borsod-Abaúj-Zemplén County
18:30 CET	Griffiths 60'; Marjanović 75'	Report	Pákolicz 18'	Stadium: DVTK Stadion; Attendance: 5,906; Referee: (Hungary) Viktor Kassai

22 November 2014 15	MTK	0–2	Diósgyőr	Budapest, Pest County
14:00 CET		Report	Griffiths 9', 32'	Stadium: Bozsik Stadion; Attendance: 825; Referee: (Hungary) Zsolt Szabó

29 November 2014 16	Puskás	1–0	Diósgyőr	Felcsút, Fejér County
18:00 CET	Gohér 45+2'	Report		Stadium: Pancho Arena; Attendance: 1,661; Referee: (Hungary) Péter Solymosi

7 December 2014 17	Diósgyőr	2–1	Újpest	Diósgyőr, Borsod-Abaúj-Zemplén County
16:30 CET	Elek 9'; Griffiths 90+4'	Report	Suljić 3'	Stadium: DVTK Stadion; Attendance: 5,774; Referee: (Hungary) Tamás Bognár

28 February 2015 18	Haladás	1–1	Diósgyőr	Szombathely, Vas County
14:00 CET	Németh 63'; Devecseri (yellow card) 67'; Schimmer (yellow card) 90'	Summary	Krstić 16'; Grumić (yellow card) 56'	Stadium: Rohonci Street Stadium; Attendance: 2,200; Referee: (Hungary) Zsolt Szabó

7 March 2015 19	Kecskeméti TE	2–1	Diósgyőr	Kecskemét, Bács-Kiskun County
16:00 CET	Novák 10'; Karan (yellow card) 33' (goal) 67'; Savić (yellow card) 48'	Summary	Szalai (yellow card) 20'; Gosztonyi 25'; William (red card) 30'; Griffiths (yellow card) 82'	Stadium: Széktói Stadion; Attendance: 1,820; Referee: (Hungary) István Vad

13 March 2015 20	Diósgyőr	2–2	Pécsi MFC	Diósgyőr, Borsod-Abaúj-Zemplén County
19:00 CET	Bacsa 28'; Marjanović 31'; Szalai (yellow card) 33'; Husić (yellow card) 84'; Okuka (yellow card) 90'	Summary	James (yellow card) 33'; Makriev 42'; Weitzer (yellow card) 54'; Rácz 74'; József Nagy (yellow card) 88'	Stadium: DVTK Stadion; Attendance: 3,034; Referee: (Hungary) Péter Solymosi

22 March 2015 21	Debreceni VSC	1–0	Diósgyőr	Debrecen, Hajdú-Bihar County
18:30 CET	Tisza 3'	Summary		Stadium: Nagyerdei Stadion; Attendance: 3,338; Referee: (Hungary) Adam Farkas

4 April 2015 22	Diósgyőr	1–2	Paks	Diósgyőr, Borsod-Abaúj-Zemplén County
18:30 CET	Husić (yellow card) 24'; Németh (yellow card) 32'; Griffiths 69'	Summary	Gévay (yellow card) 22'; Könyves 77' 85'	Stadium: DVTK Stadion; Attendance: 2,673; Referee: (Hungary) Zoltán Iványi

11 April 2015 23	Honvéd	1–1	Diósgyőr	Budapest
16:00 CET	Ikenne (yellow card) 15'; Hidi 31'	Summary	Marjanović 7' (yellow card) 53'; William (yellow card) 26'; Koman (yellow card) 33'; Egerszegi (yellow card) 81'	Stadium: Bozsik Stadion; Attendance: 1,047; Referee: (Hungary) Sándor Andó-Szabó

19 April 2015 24	Diósgyőr	1–2	Videoton	Diósgyőr, Borsod-Abaúj-Zemplén County
14:00 CET	Griffiths 90'	Summary	Szolnoki (yellow card) 42'; Filipe Oliveira 47'; Feczesin 58'	Stadium: DVTK Stadion; Attendance: 4,000; Referee: (Hungary) Zoltán Iványi

25 April 2015 25	Ferencváros	3–0	Diósgyőr	Budapest
14:00 CET	Mateos 29' (pen.); Böde 43'; Lamah 54'; Bönig (yellow card) 90'	Summary	Németh (yellow card) 37'	Stadium: Groupama Arena; Attendance: 10,114; Referee: (Hungary) Jozsef Erdos

=== Classification ===
Pos	Team	Pld	W	D	L	GF	GA	GD	Pts	Qualification or relegation
5	Paks	30	14	9	7	44	27	+17	51	
6	Újpest	30	14	9	7	40	28	+12	51	
7	Diósgyőr	30	13	9	8	43	36	+7	48	
8	Győr (R)	30	10	8	12	41	44	−3	38	Relegation to Nemzeti Bajnokság III (Note: Győr won't be a member of 2015–16 Nemzeti Bajnokság I due to financial and licence problems)
9	Kecskemét (R)	30	10	8	12	30	39	−9	38	Dissolved - Kecskeméti LC KTE SI in the Bács-Kiskun County Football League One as successor (Note: Kecskemét, Nyíregyháza and Pécs won't be members of 2015–16 Nemzeti Bajnokság I due to licence problems)

Source: mlsz.hu (in Hungarian)
Rules for classification: 1st points; 2nd overall wins; 3rd goal difference; 4th head-to-head points; 5th head-to-head goal difference; 6th head-to-head away goals scored; 7th fair-play points; 8th drawing of lots
(R) Relegated

=== Results summary ===
Overall								Home						Away					
Pld	W	D	L	GF	GA	GD	Pts	W	D	L	GF	GA	GD	W	D	L	GF	GA	GD
17	9	5	3	27	19	+8	32	7	2	0	19	10	+9	2	3	3	8	9	−1

Last updated: 7 December 2014.
Source: NB1

=== Results by round ===
Round	1	2	3	4	5	6	7	8	9	10	11	12	13	14	15	16	17	18	19	20	21	22	23	24	25	26	27	28	29	30
Ground	H	A	H	H	A	H	A	H	A	H	A	H	A	H	A	A	H													
Result	W	D	W	W	W	D	L	W	L	W	D	D	D	W	W	L	W													
Position	6	4	3	3	2	3	5	4	4	4	4	4	5	4	3	3	3													

Updated to match(es) played on 7 December 2014. Source: Matches
A = Away; H = Home; W = Win; D = Draw; L = Loss

== Hungarian Cup ==
13 August 2014 Round 1	Vasas	0–4	Diósgyőr	Budapest, Pest County
19:30 CEST		Report	Bori 27'; Bacsa 34'; Takács 55'; Gosztonyi 81'	Stadium: Stadion Rudolf Illovszky; Referee: (Hungary) Tamás Nazsa

10 September 2014 Round 2	Iváncsa	0–4	Diósgyőr	Iváncsa, Fejér County
15:30 CEST		Report	Griffiths 16', 33'; Grumić 46'; Bognár 77'	Stadium: Városi Sporttelep; Attendance: 500; Referee: (Hungary) Gábor Barna

24 September 2014 Round 3	Sajóbábony	1–4	Diósgyőr	Sajóbábony, Borsod-Abaúj-Zemplén County
15:00 CEST	Nyeste 79'	Report	Grumić 13'; Takács 26', 63'; Marjanović 88'	Stadium: Városi Sporttelep; Attendance: 2,200; Referee: (Hungary) Gyöngyi Gaál

28 October 2014 Quarter-final	Videoton	2–1	Diósgyőr	Székesfehérvár, Fejér County
17:30 CET	Debreceni 22' (o.g.); Nikolić 86'	Report	Griffiths 64'	Stadium: Sóstói Stadion; Attendance: 1,526; Referee: (Hungary) Zoltán Iványi

== League Cup ==
2 September 2014 1	Cegléd	4–1	Diósgyőr	Cegléd, Pest County
16:30 CEST	Griffiths 47' (o.g.); Viniczai 50'; Laczkó 83'; Kormos 84'	Report	Mahalek 35'	Stadium: Stadion Malomtó széli Attendance: 400; Referee: (Hungary) Zoltán J. Kovács

16 September 2014 2	Diósgyőr	4–1	Szolnok	Miskolc, Borsod-Abaúj-Zemplén County
18:00 CEST	Bognár 38' (pen.); Takács 61', 87'; Bacsa 77'	Report	Urbin 12'	Stadium: DVTK Stadion; Attendance: 1,276; Referee: (Hungary) Ferenc Karakó

7 October 2014 3	Diósgyőr	3–0	Nyíregyháza	Miskolc, Borsod-Abaúj-Zemplén County
17:00 CEST	Icsó 9'; Bacsa 16'; Csirszki 44'	Report		Stadium: DVTK Stadion; Attendance: 1,328; Referee: (Hungary) Tamás Nazsa

14 October 2014 4	Nyíregyháza	0–0	Diósgyőr	Nyíregyháza, Szabolcs-Szatmár-Bereg County
14:00 CEST		Report		Stadium: Városi Stadion; Attendance: 500; Referee: (Hungary) József Berger

11 November 2014 5	Szolnok	2–1	Diósgyőr	Szolnok, Jász-Nagykun-Szolnok County
13:30 CET	Galambos 45'; Papucsek 71'	Report	Takács 53'	Stadium: Tiszaligeti Stadion; Attendance: 200; Referee: (Hungary) Balázs Böcskei

18 November 2014 6	Diósgyőr	3–1	Cegléd	Miskolc, Borsod-Abaúj-Zemplén County
16:00 CEST	Farkas 28' (o.g.); Barczi 31'; Takács 74'	Report	Farkas 90'	Stadium: DVTK Stadion; Attendance: 676; Referee: (Hungary) Ferenc Karakó

Pos	Team	Pld	W	D	L	GF	GA	GD	Pts	Qualification	NYÍ	DIÓ	CEG	SZO
1	Nyíregyháza	6	4	1	1	8	4	+4	13	Advance to knockout phase	—	0–0	3–0	1–0
2	Diósgyőr	6	3	1	2	12	8	+4	10	Advance to knockout phase	3–0	—	3–1	4–1
3	Cegléd	6	2	0	4	9	12	−3	6		1–2	4–1	—	2–1
4	Szolnok	6	2	0	4	6	11	−5	6		0–2	2–1	2–1	—

Source: Soccerway

== UEFA Europa League ==
The First and Second Qualifying Round draws took place at UEFA headquarters in Nyon, Switzerland on 23 June 2014.

3 July 2014 Q1 Leg 1	Diósgyőr (Hungary)	2–1	(Malta) Birkirkara	Debrecen
20:30 CEST	Barczi 33'; Bacsa 90+3'	Report	Matheus 35'	Stadium: Nagyerdei Stadion; Attendance: 6,112; Referee: (Andorra) Ignasi Villamayor Rozados

10 July 2014 Q1 Leg 2	Birkirkara (Malta)	1–4 (2–6 agg.)	(Hungary) Diósgyőr	Ta' Qali
19:30 CEST	Camenzuli 44'	Report	Elek 30'; Husić 62'; Barczi 66'; Marjanović 90+1'	Stadium: Ta' Qali National Stadium; Attendance: 1,200; Referee: (Montenegro) Pavle Radovanović

17 July 2014 Q2 Leg 1	Litex Lovech (Bulgaria)	0–2	(Hungary) Diósgyőr	Lovech
19:45 CEST		Report	Németh 83'; Grumić 90'	Stadium: Lovech Stadium; Attendance: 1,300; Referee: (Cyprus) Marios Panayi

24 July 2014 Q2 Leg 2	Diósgyőr (Hungary)	1–2 (3–2 agg.)	(Bulgaria) Litex Lovech	Nyíregyháza
20:30 CEST	Gosztonyi 38' (pen.)	Report	Asprilla 80'; Jordán 85' (pen.)	Stadium: Városi Stadion; Attendance: 4,260; Referee: (Switzerland) Nikolaj Hänni

31 July 2014 Q3 Leg 1	Diósgyőr (Hungary)	1–5	(Russia) Krasnodar	Debrecen
20:30 CEST	Bacsa 49'	Report	Ari 28'; Ahmedov 40'; Pererya 51'; Joãozinho 88' (pen.); Bystrov 90'	Stadium: Nagyerdei Stadion; Attendance: 4,664; Referee: (Turkey) Bülent Yıldırım

7 August 2014 Q3 Leg 2	Krasnodar (Russia)	3–0 (8–1 agg.)	(Hungary) Diósgyőr	Krasnodar
18:00 CEST	Konaté 30' 55'; Ari 86'	Report		Stadium: Kuban Stadium; Attendance: 8,800; Referee: (Germany) Christian Dingert
