= Bence Rakaczki =

Hungarian footballer

Personal information
- Full name: Bence Rakaczki
- Date of birth: 14 May 1993
- Place of birth: Miskolc, Hungary
- Date of death: 16 January 2014 (aged 20)
- Place of death: Miskolc, Hungary
- Height: 1.98 m (6 ft 6 in)
- Position: Goalkeeper

Team information
- Current team: Diósgyőri VTK
- Number: 13

Youth career
- 2003–2011: Diósgyőri VTK

Senior career*
Years	Team	Apps	(Gls)
2012–2014	Diósgyőri VTK	4	(0)
- * Club domestic league appearances and goals as of 27 May 2012

Bence Rakaczki (14 May 1993 – 16 January 2014) was a Hungarian football player who played for Diósgyőri VTK.

Rakaczki died of leukemia on 16 January 2014, aged 20.
