= Michal Hanek =

Slovak footballer

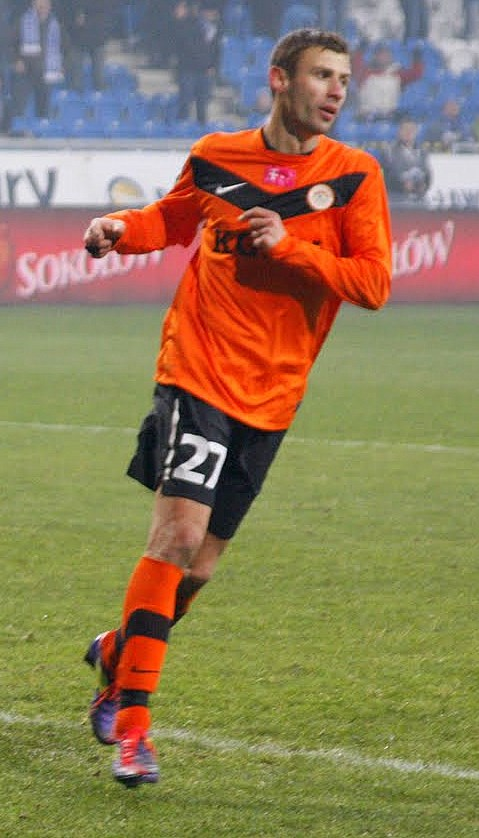

Personal information
- Date of birth: 18 September 1980 (age 46)
- Place of birth: Trenčín, Czechoslovakia
- Height: 1.86 m (6 ft 1 in)
- Position: Defensive midfielder

Youth career
- Trenčín

Senior career*
Years	Team	Apps	(Gls)
- Nitra
1998–2002	Dubnica	102	(3)
2003–2005	Dinamo Moscow	45	(2)
2006	Sparta Prague	2	(0)
2006–2009	Slovan Bratislava	77	(9)
2009–2010	Tatran Prešov	30	(4)
2010–2011	Polonia Bytom	28	(1)
2011	Zagłębie Lubin	10	(0)
2012	Kapfenberger SV	7	(1)
2012–2013	Diósgyőr	20	(0)
2014–2015	Martin	38	(6)
2015–2018	Belá-Dulice		

International career
2002–2005	Slovakia	14	(0)

Managerial career
- 2019: Podbrezová (assistant)
- 2019–2020: AS Trenčín (assistant)
- 2025-2026: Pohronie (assistant)
- * Club domestic league appearances and goals

Michal Hanek (born 18 September 1980) is a Slovak professional football coach and former player who played as a midfielder.

== Career ==
=== Club ===
Hanek began his professional career with MFK Dubnica in the Slovak Corgoň Liga.

In May 2011, he joined Zagłębie Lubin.

=== International ===
He was a part of Slovakia national football team.

== Honours ==
Sparta Prague

- Czech Cup: 2005–06

Slovan Bratislava

- Slovak First Football League: 2008–09
