= Enrique Carreño =

Spanish footballer

Personal information
- Full name: Enrique Javier Carreño Salvago
- Date of birth: 27 November 1986 (age 39)
- Place of birth: Utrera, Spain
- Height: 1.83 m (6 ft 0 in)
- Position: Forward

Youth career
- Sevilla

Senior career*
Years	Team	Apps	(Gls)
2005–2010	Sevilla B	72	(17)
2007–2008	→ Alcalá (loan)	16	(2)
2008	→ Alcorcón (loan)	11	(1)
2010	Sevilla	1	(0)
2010–2011	Académica	5	(0)
2011–2012	Diósgyőr	11	(0)
2012	Zaragoza B	13	(10)
2012–2013	Huracán	34	(5)
2013–2014	Hospitalet	28	(5)
2014–2015	Guijuelo	9	(0)
2015	Cacereño	17	(8)
2015–2016	Badajoz	35	(27)
2016–2017	Sabadell	20	(2)
2017–2018	Europa	17	(19)
2018–2020	Utrera	43	(9)

International career
2005	Spain U19	1	(0)
- * Club domestic league appearances and goals

Enrique Javier Carreño Salvago (born 27 November 1986) is a Spanish former footballer who played as a forward.

== Club career ==
Born in Utrera, Province of Seville, Carreño played his first years as a senior with Sevilla FC, but appeared almost exclusively for their reserves in the third division. He split the 2007–08 season between two clubs in the same league, CD Alcalá and AD Alcorcón, on loan.

On 9 January 2010, Carreño made his debut for Sevilla's first team, coming on as a substitute for Diego Perotti in the second half of a 1–2 La Liga home loss against Racing de Santander. In the summer, he left the Andalusians and signed for Académica de Coimbra in Portugal, being rarely used during the campaign.

Carreño moved clubs and countries again in the 2011 off-season, joining Diósgyőri VTK in the Hungarian top tier. He played his official match on 16 July, featuring ten minutes in a 4–1 home win over Zalaegerszegi TE.

Returned to his country in the 2012 January transfer window, Carreño competed solely in lower league football. The exception to this was the 2017–18 campaign, when he appeared for Europa F.C. in the Gibraltar Premier Division.
