= Balázs Szabó (footballer) =

Hungarian footballer

Personal information
- Date of birth: 28 October 1995 (age 31)
- Place of birth: Kazincbarcika, Hungary
- Height: 1.80 m (5 ft 11 in)
- Position: Midfielder

Team information
- Current team: Kazincbarcika
- Number: 10

Youth career
- 2003–2005: Putnok
- 2005–2012: Kazincbarcika
- 2009–2010: → Honvéd (loan)

Senior career*
Years	Team	Apps	(Gls)
2012–2019	Diósgyőr	7	(0)
2015	→ Soproni VSE (loan)	2	(0)
2017–2018	→ BFC Siófok (loan)	8	(0)
2018–2019	→ Balmazújváros (loan)	18	(1)
2019	Balmazújváros	24	(5)
2019–2020	Taksony SE	10	(3)
2020–2021	Szolnok	22	(0)
2021–	Kazincbarcika	56	(5)
- * Club domestic league appearances and goals as of 21 December 2023

Balázs Szabó (born 28 October 1995) is a Hungarian football player who plays for Kazincbarcika.

== Career statistics ==
Appearances and goals by club, season and competition
Club	Season	League		Cup		League Cup		Europe		Total	
Club	Season	Apps	Goals	Apps	Goals	Apps	Goals	Apps	Goals	Apps	Goals
Diósgyőr
Diósgyőr	2012–13	1	0	0	0	1	0	–	–	2	0
Diósgyőr	2013–14	1	0	0	0	5	0	–	–	6	0
Diósgyőr	2014–15	0	0	1	0	3	0	–	–	4	0
Diósgyőr	2016–17	3	0	3	0	–	–	–	–	6	0
Diósgyőr	Total	5	0	4	0	9	0	0	0	18	0
Sopron
Sopron	2014–15	2	0	0	0	0	0	–	–	2	0
Sopron	Total	2	0	0	0	0	0	0	0	2	0
Siófok
Siófok	2017–18	8	0	3	0	–	–	–	–	11	0
Siófok	Total	8	0	3	0	0	0	0	0	11	0
Balmazújváros
Balmazújváros	2018–19	18	1	1	0	–	–	–	–	19	1
Balmazújváros	Total	18	1	1	0	0	0	0	0	19	1
Career total		33	1	8	0	9	0	0	0	50	1

Updated to games played as of 19 May 2019.

== Honours ==
Diósgyőr

- Hungarian League Cup (1): 2013–14
