= Szabolcs Pál =

Hungarian footballer (born 1988)

Personal information
- Date of birth: 14 January 1988 (age 38)
- Place of birth: Budapest, Hungary
- Height: 1.85 m (6 ft 1 in)
- Position: Forward

Team information
- Current team: Eger
- Number: 16

Youth career
- 2003–2005: Vasas

Senior career*
| Years | Team | Apps | (Gls) |
| 2005–2006 | Vasas Budapest | 0 | (0) |
| 2006–2011 | MTK Budapest | 1 | (0) |
| 2008–2011 | → MTK Budapest II | 44 | (11) |
| 2007–2008 | → BKV Előre (loan) | 21 | (1) |
| 2008–2009 | → Integrál-DAC (loan) | 6 | (0) |
| 2011–2012 | Diósgyőr | 19 | (2) |
| 2012 | → Siófok (loan) | 12 | (1) |
| 2012–2013 | Siófok | 26 | (5) |
| 2013–2014 | Bayern Hof | 22 | (4) |
| 2015–2016 | SV Neuberg | 38 | (14) |
| 2016–2017 | Novohrad Lučenec | 20 | (4) |
| 2017–2020 | Érd | 58 | (14) |
| 2020– | Eger | 44 | (5) |
- * Club domestic league appearances and goals as of 7 February 2022

Szabolcs Pál (born 14 January 1988) is a Hungarian footballer who plays as a forward for Érd.

Pál made his debut for the club on 1 December 2010 in a 4–0 defeat to Paks in the Hungarian League Cup.

== Honours ==
Vasas

- Nemzeti Bajnokság I: 2007–08; runner-up 2006–07
- Magyar Kupa runner-up: 2005–06
