= Norbert Tajti =

Hungarian footballer

Personal information
- Date of birth: 7 October 1983 (age 43)
- Place of birth: Eger, Hungary
- Height: 1.88 m (6 ft 2 in)
- Position: Goalkeeper

Team information
- Current team: Dabas–Gyón

Senior career*
Years	Team	Apps	(Gls)
2003	Marcali VFC		
2003–2004	Besenyőtelek SC		
2004–2007	Jászapáti VSE	60	(0)
2007–2008	Kazincbarcika	13	(0)
2008–2011	Mezőkövesd	50	(0)
2011	→ Diósgyőr (loan)	3	(0)
2011–2013	Diósgyőr	6	(0)
2013–2015	Siófok	59	(0)
2015–2016	Vác	6	(0)
2016	Felsőtárkány	16	(0)
2016–2020	Siófok	40	(0)
2020	Balatonlelle	2	(0)
2020–2022	Tiszakécske	7	(0)
2022–	Dabas–Gyón	4	(0)
- * Club domestic league appearances and goals as of 27 March 2022

Norbert Tajti (born 7 October 1983) is a Hungarian football player who plays for Dabas–Gyón.
