= Paco Gallardo =

Spanish footballer (born 1980)

Personal information
- Full name: Francisco Gallardo León
- Date of birth: 13 January 1980 (age 46)
- Place of birth: Seville, Spain
- Height: 1.72 m (5 ft 8 in)
- Position: Midfielder

Team information
- Current team: Spain U19 (manager)

Youth career
- Sevilla

Senior career*
| Years | Team | Apps | (Gls) |
| 1998–2000 | Sevilla B | 32 | (2) |
| 2000–2007 | Sevilla | 118 | (8) |
| 2004–2005 | → Getafe (loan) | 22 | (1) |
| 2006 | → Vitória Guimarães (loan) | 2 | (0) |
| 2006 | → Deportivo La Coruña (loan) | 7 | (0) |
| 2006–2007 | → Murcia (loan) | 20 | (2) |
| 2007–2009 | Murcia | 16 | (1) |
| 2009–2011 | Huesca | 35 | (0) |
| 2011–2013 | Diósgyőr | 40 | (3) |
| 2013–2014 | Puskás | 20 | (1) |
| Total | | 312 | (18) |

International career
| 1997–1998 | Spain U17 | 4 | (0) |
| 1998–1999 | Spain U18 | 9 | (1) |
| 2000–2001 | Spain U21 | 5 | (0) |

Managerial career
- 2015–2017: Sevilla (youth)
- 2017–2018: Sevilla C
- 2019–2021: Sevilla B
- 2023: Leeds United (co-interim)
- 2023: Leeds United U21
- 2024–: Spain U19
- 2025: Spain U20
Medal record
Men's football
Representing Spain (as manager)
UEFA European Under-19 Championship
| Winner | 2026 Wales |
| Runner-up | 2025 Romania |
- * Club domestic league appearances and goals

Francisco "Paco" Gallardo León (born 13 January 1980) is a Spanish former professional footballer who played as a midfielder. He is currently manager of the Spain national under-19 team.

== Playing career ==
=== Sevilla ===
Born in Seville, Andalusia, and a product of hometown club Sevilla's youth system, Gallardo made his first-team debut aged 20, being instrumental in their 2001 return to La Liga and proceeding to have a further two solid seasons with the main squad. In November of that year, he was fined and suspended by the Royal Spanish Football Federation for violating standards of "sporting dignity and decorum" when he congratulated teammate José Antonio Reyes, who had just scored, by bending down and biting on his penis.

After a relatively successful loan at Getafe, helping the Madrid side to retain their newly acquired top-division status, Gallardo's career would be very irregular: he served two unassuming loans in early 2006, starting with Vitória de Guimarães from Portugal, then moved in the 2006–07 campaign to Real Murcia in the Segunda División, still on contract to Sevilla.

=== Murcia ===
Gallardo signed on a permanent basis prior to the start of 2007–08, but could only appear in ten league matches in an eventual relegation from the top flight. In the following season he was ousted from the squad alongside José María Movilla by manager Javier Clemente, and spent several months without a team, being reinstated in March 2009 after the coach's dismissal; he was finally released in June.

=== Later career ===
On 12 November 2009, Gallardo joined another club in the second tier, Huesca, after a successful week's trial. He finished his career at the age of 34, after three years in Hungary with two teams.

== Coaching career ==
Gallardo returned to the Ramón Sánchez-Pizjuán Stadium in the summer of 2015, first being in charge of the academy and later being appointed at the helm of the amateur team in the Tercera División, with Carlos Marchena as his assistant. For three seasons, he then managed Sevilla Atlético in the Segunda División B (renamed Primera División RFEF for the 2021–22 season).

In November 2022, Gallardo joined Premier League side Leeds United as first-team coach in Jesse Marsch's staff. Following the latter's dismissal, he was named co-interim alongside Chris Armas and Michael Skubala; shortly after, he was appointed their under-21 manager.

Gallardo then acted as manager to Spain's under-19 and under-20 national sides. He led the former age group to second place at the 2025 UEFA European Championship held in Romania.

== Managerial statistics ==
As of 6 December 2021

Managerial record by team and tenure
| Team | Nat | From | To | Record | | | | | | | | Ref |
| Team | Nat | From | To | G | W | D | L | GF | GA | GD | Win % | Ref |
|---|---|---|---|---|---|---|---|---|---|---|---|---|
| Sevilla C | (Spain) | 7 June 2017 | 28 April 2018 | 35 | 13 | 11 | 11 | 53 | 48 | +5 | 37.14 | |
| Sevilla B | (Spain) | 28 May 2019 | 13 October 2021 | 54 | 19 | 16 | 19 | 68 | 69 | −1 | 35.19 | |
| Total | | | | 89 | 32 | 27 | 30 | 123 | 117 | +6 | 35.96 | — |

== Honours ==
=== Player ===
Sevilla

- Segunda División: 2000–01

=== Manager ===
Spain U19

- UEFA European Under-19 Championship: 2026; runner-up: 2025
