= Tamás Nagy (footballer, born 1988) =

Hungarian footballer

Personal information
- Date of birth: 18 January 1988 (age 38)
- Place of birth: Ózd, Hungary
- Height: 1.80 m (5 ft 11 in)
- Position: Centre back

Team information
- Current team: Teskánd KSE

Youth career
- 2003–2006: Kazincbarcika

Senior career*
Years	Team	Apps	(Gls)
2006–2008	Kazincbarcika	30	(1)
2008–2009	Videoton	0	(0)
2009	→ Kazincbarcika (loan)	13	(6)
2009–2011	Bőcs	10	(1)
2010	→ Kazincbarcika (loan)	31	(4)
2011–2013	Diósgyőr	31	(0)
2013–2015	Pápa	34	(2)
2015–2018	ZTE	78	(4)
2018–2019	Nyíregyháza	7	(2)
2019–2021	Kaposvári	49	(3)
2021–	Teskánd KSE	0	(0)
- * Club domestic league appearances and goals as of 28 April 2021

Tamás Nagy (born 18 January 1988) is a Hungarian football player who plays for Teskánd KSE.
