= Tibor Halgas =

Hungarian footballer (1981–2020)

Personal information
- Full name: Tibor Halgas
- Date of birth: 26 May 1981
- Place of birth: Budapest, Hungary
- Date of death: 4 February 2020 (aged 38)
- Place of death: Budapest
- Height: 1.81 m (5 ft 11 1/2 in)
- Position: Midfielder

Senior career*
Years	Team	Apps	(Gls)
1999–2003	Ferencvárosi TC	12	(0)
2001–2002	→ Lombard-Pápa TFC (loan)		
2002	→ Celldömölki VSE (loan)		
2003–2007	Diósgyőri VTK	74	(8)
2004–2005	→ Videoton FC (loan)	1	(0)
2007–2008	Soroksár SC	7	(0)
2008–2010	BKV Előre SC	50	(6)
2010–2013	Diósgyőri VTK	8	(1)
2012	→ Kazincbarcikai SC (loan)	10	(0)
2012	→ Ceglédi VSE (loan)	6	(0)
- * Club domestic league appearances and goals as of 22 February 2013

Tibor Halgas (26 May 1981 – 4 February 2020) was a Hungarian football player.
