= Bernardo Frizoni =

Brazilian footballer (born 1990)

Personal information
- Full name: Bernardo Frizoni Da Cruz Diás
- Date of birth: 12 March 1990 (age 36)
- Place of birth: Volta Redonda, Brazil
- Height: 1.77 m (5 ft 9 1/2 in)
- Position: Left-back

Team information
- Current team: Motorlet Prague
- Number: 5

Youth career
- Vasco da Gama
- América
- Volta Redonda

Senior career*
Years	Team	Apps	(Gls)
2009–2010	Honvéd Budapest II	5	(0)
2010–2011	Barcs	9	(3)
2011–2012	Moldava nad Bodvou	9	(1)
2012	Diósgyőr	9	(3)
2012–2014	Zalaegerszeg	56	(9)
2014–2015	Lombard-Pápa	27	(0)
2015–2016	Podbrezová	3	(0)
2016–2017	Vlašim	28	(2)
2017–2018	Bohemians 1905	1	(0)
2017–2018	→ Olympia Prague (loan)	25	(1)
2018	→ Hapoel Ashkelon (loan)	6	(1)
2019	Viktoria Žižkov	8	(0)
2019	SHB Da Nang	12	(3)
2020	Vlašim	8	(0)
2020–	Motorlet Prague		
- * Club domestic league appearances and goals as of 11:54, 26 December 2021 (UTC)

Bernardo Frizoni (born 12, March 1990) is a Brazilian football player who plays for Czech club Motorlet Prague.

== Career ==
=== FK Bodva Moldava nad Bodvou ===
In winter 2011, Bernardo Frizoni has signed contract for Slovak club FK Bodva Moldava nad Bodvou.

=== FK Viktoria Žižkov ===
On 18 February 2019, Viktoria Žižkov announced that they had signed Bernardo on a contract until 30 June 2019.
