= Péter Takács (footballer) =

Hungarian footballer

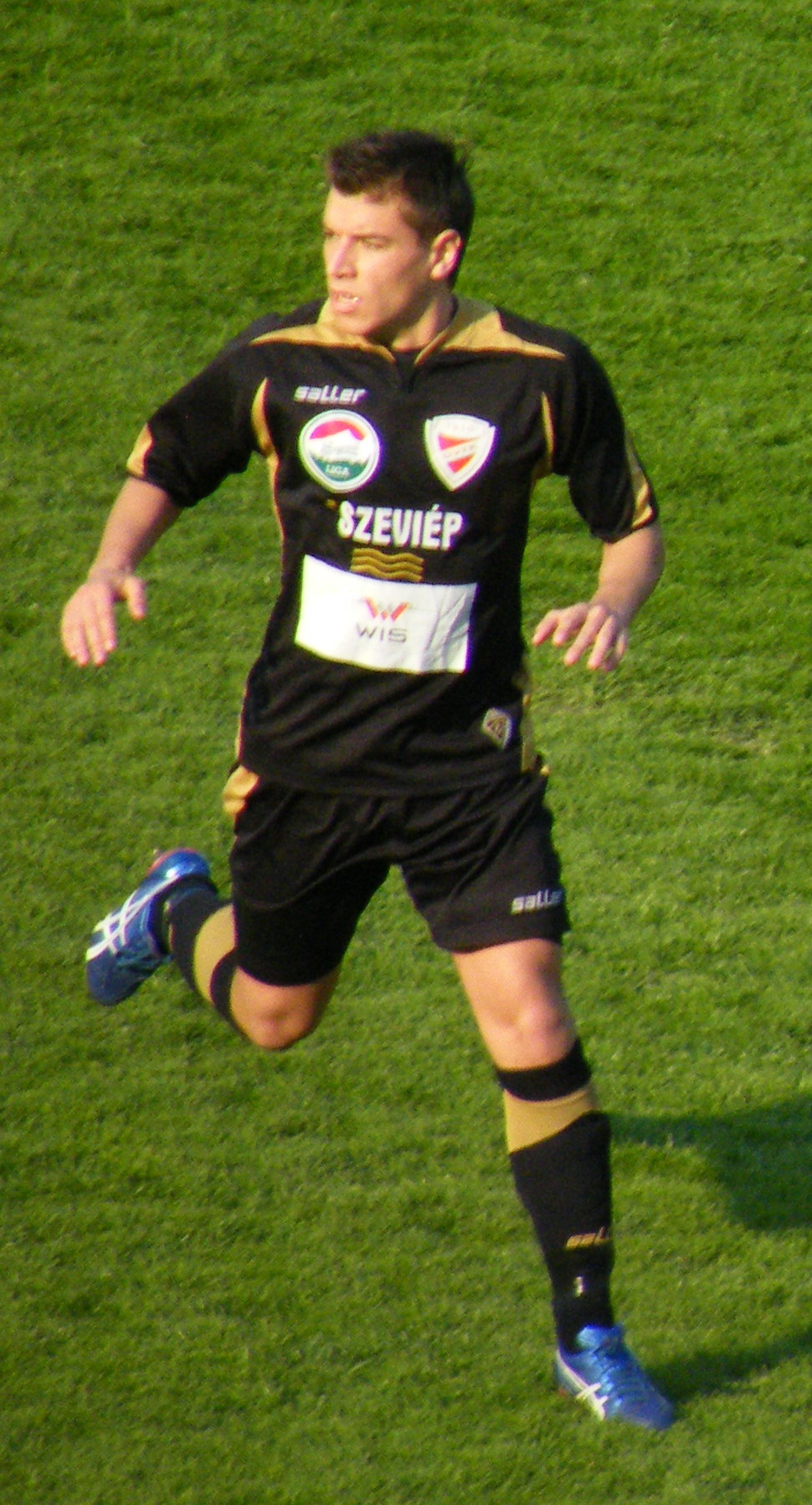

Personal information
- Full name: Péter Takács
- Date of birth: 25 January 1990 (age 36)
- Place of birth: Miskolc, Hungary
- Height: 1.75 m (5 ft 9 in)
- Position: Midfielder

Team information
- Current team: Emődi ÁIDSE
- Number: 4

Youth career
- 2003: Diósgyőr
- 2003–2004: Misi SC
- 2004–2008: MTK

Senior career*
Years	Team	Apps	(Gls)
2008–2010	Diósgyőr	39	(2)
2010–2012	Pápa	23	(4)
2011–2012	→ Diósgyőr (loan)	12	(1)
2012–2014	Diósgyőr	30	(0)
2014–2016	Mezőkövesd	49	(12)
2016–2017	Békéscsaba	16	(0)
2017	→ Ceglédi VSE (loan)	17	(3)
2017–2019	Kazincbarcikai	31	(6)
2019–2020	Dorogi	22	(1)
2020–2021	DEAC	18	(3)
2021	Mezőkövesd Zsóry FC II.	10	(2)
2021–2022	Putnok VSE	15	(2)
2022–2023	Hidasnémeti VSC	22	(2)
2023–2025	Miskolci VSC	55	(17)
2025–	Emődi ÁIDSE	7	(0)

International career
2009–2010	Hungary U-20	3	(0)
2010–2012	Hungary U-21	4	(0)

Managerial career
- 2021: Mezőkövesd Zsóry FC II.
- 2021–2025: Diósgyőri VTK youth
- 2025–2026: Diósgyőri VTK assistant
- 2026–: Diósgyőri VTK interim
- * Club domestic league appearances and goals as of 19:55, 8 may 2026 (CET)

Péter Takács (born 25 January 1990 in Miskolc) is a Hungarian football player who currently plays for Emődi ÁIDSE and is also the interim manager for Diósgyőri VTK. He is rumoured to be ending his playing career because of his commitment to the management job.

.

== Career statistics ==
Appearances and goals by club, season and competition
Club	Season	League			Cup		League Cup		Europe		Total	
Club	Season	Division	Apps	Goals	Apps	Goals	Apps	Goals	Apps	Goals	Apps	Goals
Diósgyőr
Diósgyőr	2007–08	Nemzeti Bajnokság I	0	0	0	0	2	0	0	0	2	0
Diósgyőr	2008–09	Nemzeti Bajnokság I	17	2	1	0	5	2	0	0	23	4
Diósgyőr	2009–10	Nemzeti Bajnokság I	22	0	2	0	3	0	0	0	27	0
Diósgyőr	2011–12	Nemzeti Bajnokság I	12	1	4	0	6	0	0	0	22	1
Diósgyőr	2012–13	Nemzeti Bajnokság I	23	0	4	0	6	0	0	0	33	0
Diósgyőr	2013–14	Nemzeti Bajnokság I	7	0	2	0	5	0	0	0	14	0
Diósgyőr	Total		81	3	13	0	27	2	0	0	121	5
Pápa	2010–11	Nemzeti Bajnokság I	23	4	3	0	2	0	0	0	28	4
Mezőkövesd	2013–14	Nemzeti Bajnokság I	11	0	0	0	1	0	0	0	12	0
Career total			115	7	16	0	30	2	0	0	161	9

Updated to games played as of 1 June 2014.

== Honours ==
- FIFA U-20 World Cup:
  - Third place: 2009
