= Georges Griffiths =

Ivorian footballer

Personal information
- Full name: Georges Henri Aboubacar Griffiths
- Date of birth: 24 February 1990
- Place of birth: Treichville, Ivory Coast
- Date of death: 5 October 2017 (aged 27)
- Place of death: Abidjan, Ivory Coast
- Height: 1.95 m (6 ft 5 in)
- Position: Forward

Youth career
- 2008: Sirocco

Senior career*
Years	Team	Apps	(Gls)
2008–2011	Indenié		(4)
2011–2013	Sirocco		
2012–2013	→ Sparta Prague B (loan)		
2013–2014	Lombard-Pápa	36	(11)
2014–2017	Diósgyőr	34	(8)

International career
2011	Ivory Coast U-23	3	(1)
- * Club domestic league appearances and goals

Georges Griffiths (24 February 1990 – 5 October 2017) was an Ivorian professional footballer who played for Hungarian sides Lombard-Pápa and Diósgyőr. While playing for AS Indenié Abengourou in Ligue 1, he scored half of his team's league goals in the 2011 league season.

Griffiths died at the age of 27 on 5 October 2017 during an aggravated robbery in which he was shot trying to prevent his car from being stolen.
