= Fernando Fernández (Spanish footballer) =

Spanish footballer and manager (born 1979)

Fernando
Personal information
- Full name: Fernando Miguel Fernández Escribano
- Date of birth: 2 June 1979 (age 47)
- Place of birth: Málaga, Spain
- Height: 1.81 m (5 ft 11 in)
- Positions: Attacking midfielder; second striker

Team information
- Current team: Betis (assistant)

Youth career
- 1988–1997: Málaga

Senior career*
Years	Team	Apps	(Gls)
1996–1997	Málaga	14	(0)
1998–1999	Real Madrid C	3	(1)
1999–2000	Real Madrid B	36	(11)
2000–2002	Real Madrid	1	(0)
2000–2002	→ Valladolid (loan)	58	(20)
2002–2008	Betis	148	(28)
2008–2011	Málaga	69	(7)
2012–2013	Diósgyőr	36	(6)
Total		365	(73)

International career
2001	Spain U21	4	(0)

Managerial career
- 2014–2015: El Palo (youth)
- 2015: El Palo
- 2016: El Palo
- 2017–2018: Málaga (youth)
- 2018–2019: Diósgyőr
- 2020–: Betis (assistant)
- * Club domestic league appearances and goals

Fernando Miguel Fernández Escribano, known simply as Fernando (Spanish pronunciation: [feɾˈnando]; born 2 June 1979), is a Spanish former professional footballer who played mainly as an attacking midfielder but also as a supporting striker. He is currently assistant manager of La Liga club Real Betis.

Over 12 seasons, he amassed La Liga totals of 276 matches and 55 goals, mostly at Betis (six years) and Málaga (three). In the competition, he also appeared for Real Madrid and Valladolid.

== Club career ==
=== Real Madrid ===
Fernando was born in Málaga, Andalusia. After starting at hometown's Málaga CF, he finished his football development in the ranks of La Liga giants Real Madrid, going on to appear once for its first team in the 1999–2000 season, against Real Zaragoza (90 minutes, 1–0 home win).

After that, Fernando joined Real Valladolid on loan as many Real Madrid canteranos would move to that club in that timeframe (Alberto Marcos, Víctor, José García Calvo, etc.).

=== Betis ===
In the summer of 2002, Fernando signed with Real Betis, scoring 15 goals in his debut campaign, with the team finishing in eighth place thanks greatly to his braces against Málaga (3–0), RCD Espanyol (4–2) and Real Sociedad (3–2). He won the only trophy of his career in 2005, the 2–1 Copa del Rey victory over CA Osasuna.

On 27 June 2008, as his role was a lesser one from 2005 to 2008 – only ten matches in his last season – Fernando signed a four-year contract with Málaga, returning to his first youth club after 11 years.

=== Málaga and later career ===
Fernando netted his first league goal for Málaga on 23 September 2009 against Espanyol, more than one year after arriving; however, this happened in a 2–1 away loss. Sparingly used in his debut season, he became a starter in 2009–10, scoring on five occasions.

Fernando continued in the starting lineups in the 2010–11 campaign, under new manager Jesualdo Ferreira. In the second matchday, he scored twice in a 5–3 win at Zaragoza, the first goal coming after just 73 seconds. Rarely used by the following coach, Manuel Pellegrini, he still contributed 21 games as the Boquerones finally avoided relegation.

On 21 August 2011, the 32-year-old Fernando was released from his contract. He moved abroad for the first time on 4 February of the following year, joining several compatriots at Hungarian side Diósgyőri VTK. He retired in June 2013.

== International career ==
Fernando won four caps for Spain at under-21 level in six months. His first arrived on 27 February 2001, when he played the second half of the 4–0 friendly defeat of England in Birmingham.

== Coaching career ==
Fernando started working as a full-time manager in 2016, with amateurs CD El Palo which he had already coached briefly the previous year after starting out with their youths. Early into the season in Tercera División, he resigned.

On 23 April 2018, Fernando was appointed at former club Diósgyőr with the purpose of avoiding relegation from the Nemzeti Bajnokság I, which was finally achieved. On 3 September 2019, with his team placed last in the standings and following a 1–0 defeat against Ferencvárosi TC at the Groupama Arena, he was dismissed.

Fernando returned to Betis in summer 2020, reuniting with Pellegrini as part of the newly signed manager's staff.

== Honours ==
Málaga

- Segunda División B: 1997–98

Betis

- Copa del Rey: 2004–05
