= José Juan Luque =

Spanish footballer (born 1977)

Personal information
- Full name: José Juan Luque Jiménez
- Date of birth: 16 October 1977 (age 49)
- Place of birth: Cantillana, Spain
- Height: 1.73 m (5 ft 8 in)
- Position: Winger

Senior career*
Years	Team	Apps	(Gls)
1996–1997	Sevilla B	29	(8)
1997	Sevilla	9	(0)
1997–1998	Badajoz	18	(0)
1998–2000	Atlético B	32	(7)
1999	→ Albacete (loan)	17	(5)
1999–2002	Atlético Madrid	55	(6)
2002	Espanyol	8	(0)
2003	Elche	19	(3)
2003–2004	Málaga	19	(1)
2005–2007	Ciudad Murcia	90	(34)
2007–2008	Granada 74	40	(17)
2008–2009	Málaga	7	(0)
2009–2010	Murcia	11	(0)
2011–2013	Diósgyőr	59	(18)
Total		413	(101)

International career
1996	Spain U18	3	(0)
- * Club domestic league appearances and goals

José Juan Luque Jiménez (born 16 October 1977) is a Spanish footballer who played as a left winger.

== Club career ==
Born in Cantillana, Province of Seville, Luque started playing professionally for Sevilla FC, appearing mostly for the reserves. His debut in La Liga was on 1 March 1997 in a 2–3 away loss against Atlético Madrid, and he appeared in nine matches as the season ended in relegation.

In summer 1998, after one season with CD Badajoz in the second division, Luque moved to Atlético de Madrid. He played with the Colchoneros mostly in the second level, and also represented the B-team before leaving the club on 30 June 2002; he was also loaned to Albacete Balompié for five months, in January 1999.

Luque split 2002–03 with RCD Espanyol and Elche CF, the former in the top flight. Subsequently, he joined Málaga CF (the first of his two spells), being rarely used over one and a half years and signing for Ciudad de Murcia in the 2005 winter transfer window. He scored a career-best 20 goals in his first full campaign as his side narrowly missed on top division promotion, being crowned joint-top scorer alongside Ikechukwu Uche of Recreativo de Huelva.

In 2007–08, Luque finished third in the Pichichi Trophy race, but Ciudad, now renamed Granada 74 CF, was eventually relegated to division three. In very late August 2009, after having completed the pre-season with Málaga – he even started and scored in a 1–3 loss against Atlante F.C. in that year's Peace Cup– he was released and soon moved to fellow league team Real Murcia, on a free transfer. He only appeared in one fourth of the league matches during the season, and his team also dropped down a tier.

In January 2011, after 325 games and 75 goals in the two major levels of Spanish football (but only 49/3 in the top level), 33-year-old Luque had his first abroad experience, signing for Diósgyőri VTK from Hungary.

== Honours ==
Atlético Madrid

- Segunda División: 2001–02

Diósgyőr

- Nemzeti Bajnokság II: 2010–11

Preceded by None	Segunda División Zarra Trophy Winner; 2005–06	Succeeded by (Spain) Marcos Márquez for Las Palmas
