= Péter Bogáti =

Hungarian footballer

Personal information
- Full name: Péter Bogáti
- Date of birth: 13 March 1991 (age 35)
- Place of birth: Budapest, Hungary
- Height: 1.83 m (6 ft 0 in)
- Position: Midfielder

Team information
- Current team: STC Salgótarján

Youth career
- 1997–2010: Ferencváros

Senior career*
Years	Team	Apps	(Gls)
2010–2011	Ferencváros II	2	(1)
2011–2013	Diósgyőr	9	(0)
2013	→ Kazincbarcika (loan)	10	(1)
2013–2014	Siófok	23	(4)
2014–2017	Budaörsi	68	(18)
2017	Monor	?	(?)
2017–	STC Salgótarján	?	(?)
- * Club domestic league appearances and goals as of 13 January 2017

Péter Bogáti (born 13 March 1991) is a Hungarian football player who plays for STC Salgótarján.
