= Vicente Arze =

Bolivian footballer (born 1985)

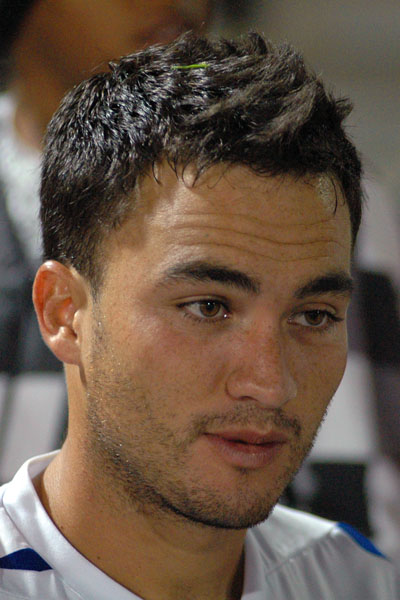

Personal information
- Full name: Vicente Arze Camacho
- Date of birth: November 22, 1985 (age 40)
- Place of birth: Santa Cruz de la Sierra, Bolivia
- Height: 5 ft 10 in (1.78 m)
- Position: Midfielder

Youth career
- 1998–1999: Blooming
- 2000–2004: Newell's Old Boys
- 2004–2007: Mercer Bears

Senior career*
Years	Team	Apps	(Gls)
2008–2009	Vancouver Whitecaps	44	(1)
2009	→ Whitecaps Residency (loan)	2	(0)
2009–2010	Aurora	29	(3)
2010–2012	Diósgyőr	37	(2)
2012–2014	Charleroi	4	(0)
2012–2013	→ Esteghlal (loan)	7	(2)
2014	Hoverla Uzhhorod	3	(0)
2015–2017	Blooming		
2018–2019	Royal Pari		

International career
2013–2014	Bolivia U20		
2013–2014	Bolivia	3	(0)
- * Club domestic league appearances and goals as of 3 August 2018

Vicente Arze Camacho (born November 22, 1985, in Santa Cruz de la Sierra) is a Bolivian footballer.

== Career ==
=== Youth and college ===
Arze attended the Franco School in his hometown of Santa Cruz de la Sierra, Bolivia, and as a teenager was part of the youth systems of famed clubs Blooming and Newell's Old Boys. He moved to Macon, Georgia, in 2004 to play college soccer at Mercer University, eventually graduating with a degree in business and marketing in May 2008.

=== Professional ===
A talented attacking midfielder who can play on flank, Arze was selected in the second round (25th overall) of the 2008 MLS Supplemental Draft by the Kansas City Wizards on January 24, 2008. He signed a two-year contract with the Whitecaps in early 2008, and played his first professional game was April 12 against Montreal Impact.

On October 2, 2008, he is nominated for Rookie of the Year (award). On December 16, 2008, the Vancouver Whitecaps announced the re-signing of Arze for the 2009 season.

Arze ended his contract with the Whitecaps at the end of the 2009 season.

On 10 December 2012, Arze was loaned out by Charleroi to Esteghlal. He made his debut on 14 December in a 4–0 win over Saipa in a Hazfi Cup match which he scored the last goal.

He returned to Blooming in January 2015 after a spell in Ukraine with Hoverla Uzhhorod.

=== International ===
Arze was part of the Bolivia U-20 squad that played in the 2003 South American U-20 championships in Uruguay. The tournament acted as the qualifiers for the 2003 U-20 World Cup finals in the United Arab Emirates. He was called up to the senior team in December 2012 just after he signed with Esteghlal.

== Personal ==
Arze's parents are Vicente Arze sr. and Maggie Camacho. He also has a stepbrother named Jean-Pierre Arze. The midfielder comes from an accomplished sporting family. His mother is a Bolivian national champion in bowling, while his uncle Monin Camacho is a South American Rally Car champion. His cousin Diego Camacho played in the men's singles tennis tournament at the 2000 Sydney Olympics .

== Honors ==
Vancouver Whitecaps

- USL First Division: 2008

Esteghlal

- Iran Pro League: 2012–13
