= Igor Gal =

Croatian footballer

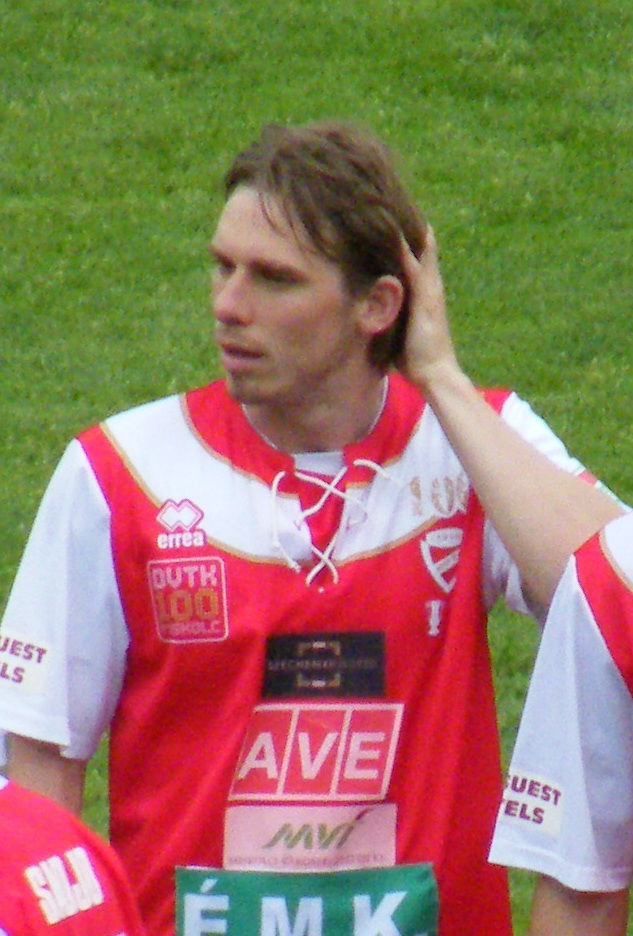

Personal information
- Full name: Igor Gal
- Date of birth: 20 January 1983 (age 43)
- Place of birth: Koprivnica, SR Croatia, SFR Yugoslavia
- Height: 1.89 m (6 ft 2 in)
- Position: Defender

Youth career
- Slaven Belupo

Senior career*
Years	Team	Apps	(Gls)
2002–2005	Slaven Belupo	59	(0)
2006–2007	Hajduk Split	43	(0)
2007–2008	Çaykur Rizespor	14	(0)
2008–2009	KF Tirana	0	(0)
2009–2010	Slaven Belupo	1	(0)
2010–2013	Diósgyőr	73	(2)
2013	EN Paralimni	13	(0)
2014	Rabotnički	7	(0)
2015	Balmazújvárosi	8	(0)
2015	Koper	3	(0)

International career
2003–2004	Croatia U21	7	(0)
- * Club domestic league appearances and goals as of 31 December 2015

Igor Gal (born 20 January 1983) is a Croatian retired football defender.
