= Krisztián Budovinszky =

Hungarian footballer

Personal information
- Full name: Krisztián Budovinszky
- Date of birth: 18 April 1976 (age 50)
- Place of birth: Mohács, Hungary
- Height: 1.93 m (6 ft 4 in)
- Position: Defender

Team information
- Current team: Zalaegerszegi TE

Youth career
- 1990–1996: Lánycsók

Senior career*
Years	Team	Apps	(Gls)
1996–1997	Mohácsi TE		
1997–1998	ASK Baumgarten	8	(2)
1998–1999	FC Retzingen		
1999–2000	BVSC Budapest	5	(0)
2000	FC Hämeenlinna		
2000	FC Haka	7	(0)
2001	Dorogi FC		
2001	Bonyhád		
2001–2002	NK Slaven Belupo		
2002–2003	Demecser	15	(2)
2003	NK Podravac		
2003–2005	Budapest Honvéd FC	48	(11)
2005–2006	Ferencvárosi TC	15	(1)
2006–2007	Budapest Honvéd FC	6	(1)
2007	First Vienna FC	7	(0)
2007–2008	Lombard-Pápa TFC	17	(1)
2008–2009	Tiszafüred	11	(1)
2009–2010	Shahrdari Tabriz F.C.		(0)
2010–2012	Diósgyőri VTK	35	(7)
2012–2013	Zalaegerszegi TE	17	(1)
2015–	Páty	10	(2)
- * Club domestic league appearances and goals as of 11 March 2012

Krisztián Budovinszky (born 18 April 1976) is a Hungarian football player who currently plays for Páty.
