= Tibor Tisza =

Hungarian footballer

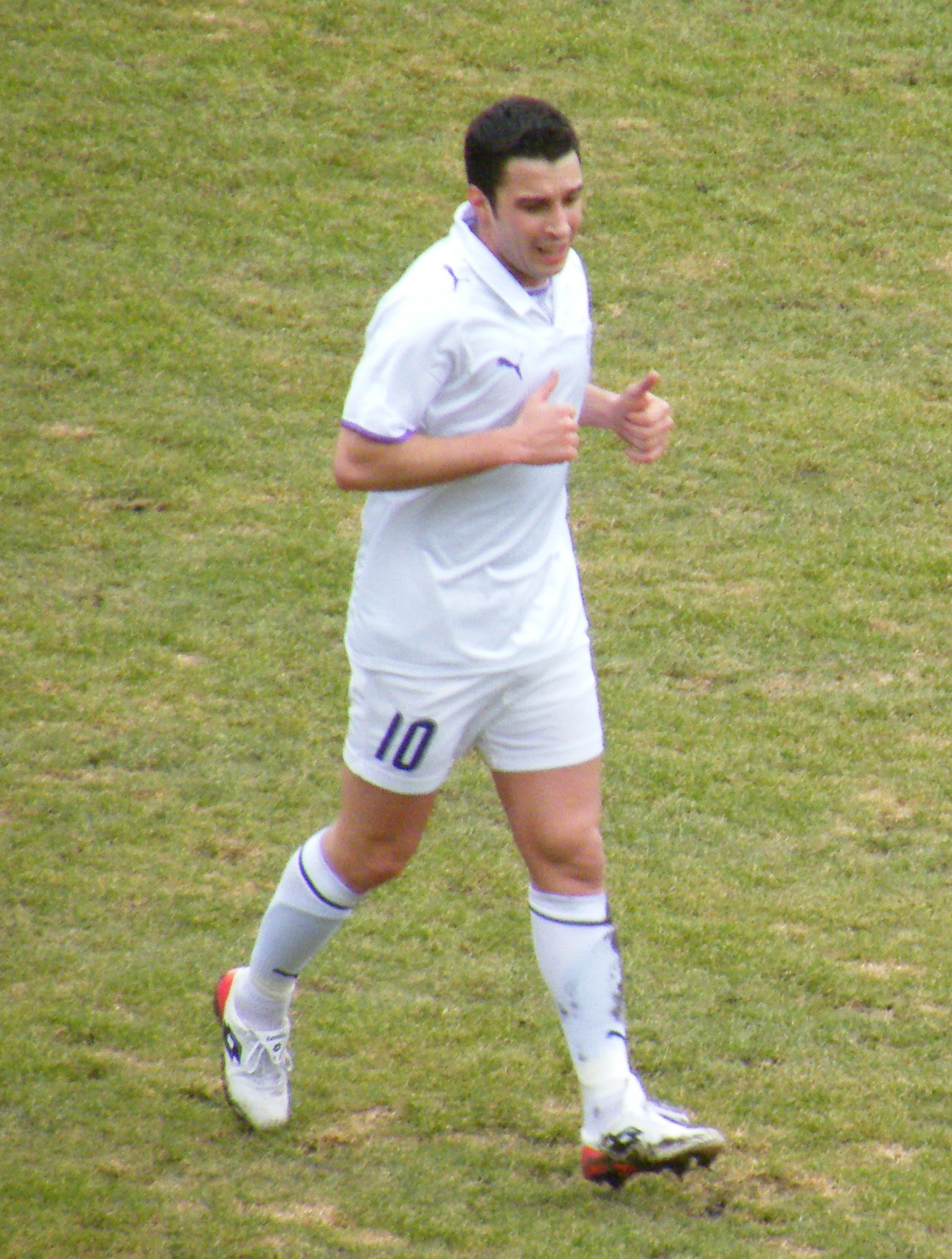

Personal information
- Full name: Tibor Tisza
- Date of birth: 10 November 1984 (age 42)
- Place of birth: Debrecen, Hungary
- Height: 1.75 m (5 ft 9 in)
- Positions: Forward; attacking midfielder; winger

Youth career
- 1990–2004: Debrecen

Senior career*
Years	Team	Apps	(Gls)
2004–2005	Diósgyőr	42	(15)
2006–2011	Újpest	84	(41)
2009–2010	→ Royal Antwerp (loan)	30	(15)
2011	→ Sint-Truidense (loan)	8	(0)
2011–2014	Diósgyőr	61	(15)
2014–2016	Debrecen	61	(15)
2016–2017	Nyíregyháza Spartacus	29	(3)
2017–2018	Debrecen	12	(0)

International career
2004–2005	Hungary U21	21	(5)
2007–2008	Hungary	5	(0)
- * Club domestic league appearances and goals as of 2 June 2018

Tibor Tisza (born 10 November 1984) is a Hungarian footballer.

== Career ==
Tisza started to play football in his hometown, Debrecen but played only in the reserve team of Debreceni VSC. In 2004, he was signed by Diósgyőr, where he spent the 2004–05 season and the autumn season of 2005–06. He then went on to join Újpest FC in January 2006.

On 17 August 2009 Tisza signed a contract for Royal Antwerp FC, being on loan for one year. He scored in his debut against Lierse S.K.

== Honours ==
- Hungary U21 Player of the Year: 2006
- Player of the Year in Royal Antwerp FC 2009–10
