= Viktor Vadász =

Hungarian footballer

Personal information
- Full name: Viktor Vadász
- Date of birth: 15 August 1986 (age 40)
- Place of birth: Székesfehérvár, Hungary
- Height: 1.84 m (6 ft 0 in)
- Position: Centre back

Team information
- Current team: Mosonmagyaróvár

Youth career
- 2000–2003: MTK
- 2003–2005: Videoton

Senior career*
Years	Team	Apps	(Gls)
2005–2011	Videoton	5	(0)
2008–2009	→ Felcsút (loan)	14	(0)
2010–2011	→ Kazincbarcika (loan)	29	(0)
2011–2014	Diósgyőr	81	(1)
2014–2015	Újpest	17	(0)
2015–2016	Békéscsaba	7	(0)
2016–2019	Győri ETO		
2019–	Mosonmagyaróvár		
- * Club domestic league appearances and goals as of 6 May 2016

Viktor Vadász (born 15 August 1986) is a Hungarian football player who currently plays for Mosonmagyaróvári TE.

== Honours ==
Diósgyőr

- Hungarian League Cup (1): 2013–14
