= Mohamadou Abdouraman =

Cameroonian football player

Personal information
- Full name: Mohamadou Abdouraman
- Date of birth: 24 January 1985 (age 41)
- Place of birth: Yaoundé, Cameroon
- Height: 1.92 m (6 ft 4 in)
- Position: Midfielder

Team information
- Current team: Ágasegyháza

Senior career*
Years	Team	Apps	(Gls)
2003–2005	Tonnerre		
2005–2006	Renova		
2006–2007	Shkumbini		
2007–2010	Bylis	13	(0)
2008	→ Gramozi (loan)		
2010	Bőcs	8	(0)
2010–2014	Diósgyőr	74	(9)
2014–2018	Nyíregyháza	65	(10)
2018–2021	Hírös-Ép	6	(0)
2021–	Ágasegyháza	7	(6)
- * Club domestic league appearances and goals

Mohamadou Abdouraman (born 24 January 1985) is a Cameroonian footballer who plays as a midfielder for Ágasegyháza.

== Career ==
Abdouraman made his debut for Diósgyőr on 4 September 2010 in a 1–0 win over Vecsési FC in the Nemzeti Bajnokság II. In 2014, he left the club and joined Nyíregyháza Spartacus.

After leaving Nyíregyháza in 2018, Abdouraman played lower-league football for Hírös-Ép and Ágasegyháza, joining the latter in 2021.

== Honours ==
Bylis

- Kategoria e Parë: 2009–10

Diósgyőr

- Hungarian League Cup: 2013–14
