= L'Imam Seydi =

French footballer (born 1985)

L´Imam Seydi
Personal information
- Full name: L´Imam Seydi
- Date of birth: 31 August 1985 (age 41)
- Place of birth: Paris, France
- Height: 1.83 m (6 ft 0 in)
- Position: Forward

Senior career*
Years	Team	Apps	(Gls)
2004–2006	Mende	38	(34)
2008–2009	Bahrain Club	22	(17)
2009–2010	Ribarroja	16	(19)
2010	Gabès	10	(8)
2011	Bodva Moldava nad Bodvou	12	(6)
2011–2013	Diósgyőr	53	(34)
2013–2015	Debrecen	17	(8)
2015	Nyíregyháza Spartacus	12	(7)
2015	Inter Baku	7	(2)
2016	Birkirkara	7	(4)
2017	Khaitan	12	(7)
2017–2018	Kelantan	0	(0)
2018	→ MISC-MIFA (loan)	20	(7)
2019	Batu Dua		
2019	→ Kelantan (loan)		
- * Club domestic league appearances and goals as of 27 July 2018

L´Imam Seydi (born 31 August 1985) is a French former footballer who played as a forward.

== Career ==
In January 2016, Seydi joined Swiss Challenge League side FC Aarau on trial, before then signing an 18-month contract with Maltese club Birkirkara, on 29 January 2016.

In August 2016, it is reported that Seydi is currently undergoing a trial in Indonesian club Persib Bandung.

In January 2018, Seydi was loaned to Malaysia Premier League MISC-MIFA on a season-long deal.

== Career statistics ==
As of match played 20 December 2015.

Appearances and goals by club, season and competition
Club	Season	League			National Cup		League Cup		Continental		Other		Total	
Club	Season	Division	Apps	Goals	Apps	Goals	Apps	Goals	Apps	Goals	Apps	Goals	Apps	Goals
Diósgyőri	2011–12	Nemzeti Bajnokság I	28	8	3	0	6	2	-		-		37	10
Diósgyőri	2012–13	Nemzeti Bajnokság I	22	4	1	0	0	0	-		-		23	4
Diósgyőri	2013–14	Nemzeti Bajnokság I	3	0	0	0	0	0	-		-		3	0
Diósgyőri	Total		53	12	4	0	6	2	-	-	-	-	63	14
Debreceni	2013–14	Nemzeti Bajnokság I	9	2	4	2	6	2	-		-		19	6
Debreceni	2014–15	Nemzeti Bajnokság I	8	2	1	0	2	1	5	0	1	0	17	3
Debreceni	Total		17	4	5	2	8	3	5	0	1	0	36	9
Nyíregyháza Spartacus	2014–15	Nemzeti Bajnokság I	12	2	0	0	1	0	-		-		13	2
Inter Baku	2015–16	Azerbaijan Premier League	7	1	1	0	-		0	0	-		8	1
Career total			89	19	10	2	15	5	5	0	1	0	120	26
