= Martin Csirszki =

Hungarian football player

Personal information
- Full name: Martin Csirszki
- Date of birth: 7 January 1995 (age 31)
- Place of birth: Miskolc, Hungary
- Height: 1.81 m (5 ft 11 in)
- Position: Midfielder

Team information
- Current team: Putnok FC
- Number: 33

Youth career
- 2009–2012: Diósgyőr
- 2010: → Haladás (loan)

Senior career*
Years	Team	Apps	(Gls)
2012–2015	Diósgyőr	7	(0)
2015	→ Szolnok	11	(0)
2015–2016	Vác	11	(0)
2016–	Putnok FC	0	(0)
- * Club domestic league appearances and goals as of 9 August 2016

Martin Csirszki (born 7 January 1995 in Miskolc) is a Hungarian football player who currently plays for Putnok FC.

== Career statistics ==
Appearances and goals by club, season and competition
Club	Season	League			Cup		League Cup		Europe		Total	
Club	Season	Division	Apps	Goals	Apps	Goals	Apps	Goals	Apps	Goals	Apps	Goals
Diósgyőr
Diósgyőr	2011–12	Nemzeti Bajnokság I	1	0	0	0	1	0	0	0	2	0
Diósgyőr	2012–13	Nemzeti Bajnokság I	5	0	3	0	5	0	0	0	13	0
Diósgyőr	2013–14	Nemzeti Bajnokság I	1	0	0	0	3	0	0	0	4	0
Diósgyőr	2014–15	Nemzeti Bajnokság I	0	0	2	0	5	1	1	0	8	1
Diósgyőr	Total		7	0	5	0	14	1	1	0	27	1
Career total			7	0	5	0	14	1	1	0	27	1

Updated to games played as of 18 November 2014.

== Honours ==
Diósgyőr

- Hungarian League Cup (1): 2013–14
