= 2016–17 Diósgyőri VTK season =

Diósgyőr
2016–17 season
- Manager: Ferenc Horváth (until 2 March 2017); Zoltán Vitelki (caretaker, from 2 March 2017 to 13 March 2017); Tamás Bódog (from 13 March 2017)
- Stadium: Diósgyőri Stadion (Old stadium); Városi Stadion (Note: The matches from the 16th round of the league were played at the Városi Stadion in Mezőkövesd, instead of Diósgyőr regular stadium, the Diósgyőri Stadion in Miskolc, opened in 1939 which was demolished to make way to the newly built Diósgyőri Stadion.); Nagyerdei Stadion (Note: As Diósgyőr temporarily played their home games at the Városi Stadion in Mezőkövesd, the match against each other could not be played there under the competition rules, it was played in the Nagyerdei Stadion in Debrecen. The match against Haladás were also played at Debrecen due to the Diósgyőr and Mezőkövesd match in the 16th round were scheduled for the same time.) (Temporary stadiums)
- Nemzeti Bajnokság I: 10th
- Magyar Kupa: Quarter-finals
- Top goalscorer: League: Roland Ugrai (5); All: Roland Ugrai (8)
- Highest home attendance: 8,052 v Ferencváros (29 October 2016, Nemzeti Bajnokság I)
- Lowest home attendance: 236 v Cegléd (1 March 2017, Magyar Kupa)
- Average home league attendance: 3,302
- Biggest win: 4–1 v Putnok (Away, 30 November 2016, Magyar Kupa)
- Biggest defeat: 2–6 v Ferencváros (Away, 30 July 2016, Nemzeti Bajnokság I)

The 2016–17 season was Diósgyőri Vasgyárak Testgyakorló Köre's 51st competitive season, 6th consecutive season in the Nemzeti Bajnokság I and 105th season in existence as a football club. In addition to the domestic league, Diósgyőr participated in that season's editions of the Magyar Kupa.

== Squad ==
Squad at end of season

Note: Flags indicate national team as defined under FIFA eligibility rules; some limited exceptions apply. Players may hold more than one non-FIFA nationality.

| No. | Pos. | Nation | Player |
|---|---|---|---|
| 1 | GK | HUN | Erik Bukrán |
| 2 | DF | LVA | Vitālijs Jagodinskis |
| 3 | DF | HUN | Marcell Mahalek |
| 4 | DF | HUN | Márk Tamás |
| 5 | DF | HUN | Zoltán Lipták |
| 6 | MF | ESP | Diego Vela |
| 7 | FW | HUN | Gábor Makrai |
| 10 | FW | HUN | Roland Ugrai |
| 11 | MF | HUN | Balázs Szabó I |
| 12 | DF | HUN | Patrik Lőrincz |
| 14 | FW | HUN | Gábor Boros |
| 15 | MF | CMR | Patrick Mevoungou |
| 17 | MF | HUN | Miklós Kitl |
| 18 | FW | HUN | Balázs Szabó II |

| No. | Pos. | Nation | Player |
|---|---|---|---|
| 19 | DF | HUN | Tibor Nagy |
| 20 | MF | HUN | Attila Busai |
| 22 | GK | CRO | Ivan Radoš |
| 23 | MF | GEO | Murtaz Daushvili |
| 24 | MF | ROU | István Fülöp |
| 27 | FW | SVK | Ákos Szarka |
| 30 | MF | ESP | Nono |
| 33 | DF | HUN | Milán Nemes |
| 48 | DF | SRB | Dejan Karan |
| 74 | MF | HUN | Patrik Ternován |
| 86 | FW | HUN | Soma Novothny |
| 94 | DF | HUN | Gábor Eperjesi |
| 98 | MF | HUN | Dávid Szalóczy |
| 99 | GK | HUN | Botond Antal |

== Transfers ==
=== Transfers in ===
| Transfer window | Pos. | No. | Player | From |
|---|---|---|---|---|
| Summer | GK | 1 | (Hungary) Erik Bukrán | Free agent (Note: Previous club Hull City.) |
| Summer | DF | 3 | (Hungary) Marcell Mahalek | Youth team |
| Summer | MF | 6 | (Spain) Diego Vela | (Spain) Racing Ferrol |
| Summer | MF | 8 | (Hungary) Bálint Oláh | Youth team |
| Summer | FW | 10 | (Hungary) Roland Ugrai | Haladás |
| Summer | MF | 11 | (Hungary) Balázs Szabó I | Youth team |
| Summer | MF | 23 | (Georgia (country)) Murtaz Daushvili | (Ukraine) Karpaty Lviv |
| Summer | MF | 30 | (Spain) Nono | (Spain) Elche |
| Summer | DF | 48 | (Serbia) Dejan Karan | Free agent (Note: Previous club Tirana.) |
| Summer | DF | 88 | (Hungary) Pál Lázár | Free agent (Note: Previous club Debrecen.) |
| Winter | MF | 15 | (Cameroon) Patrick Mevoungou | Free agent (Note: Previous club Mezőkövesd.) |
| Winter | DF | 19 | (Hungary) Tibor Nagy | Újpest |
| Winter | MF | 20 | (Hungary) Attila Busai | Ferencváros |
| Winter | MF | 24 | (Romania) István Fülöp | (Romania) Botoșani |
| Winter | FW | 27 | (Slovakia) Ákos Szarka | (Slovakia) DAC Dunajská Streda |

=== Transfers out ===
| Transfer window | Pos. | No. | Player | To |
|---|---|---|---|---|
| Summer | FW | – | (Hungary) Alex Balogh | Cigánd |
| Summer | GK | 1 | (Hungary) Illés Zöldesi | Videoton |
| Summer | DF | 4 | (Hungary) Milán Csicsvári | Cigánd |
| Summer | MF | 5 | (Canada) Manjrekar James | Vasas |
| Summer | DF | 6 | (Hungary) Gábor Kovács | Released (Note: Joined Paks.) |
| Summer | DF | 7 | (Serbia) Dražen Okuka | MTK |
| Summer | MF | 17 | (Hungary) Tamás Egerszegi | Released (Note: Joined Mezőkövesd.) |
| Summer | FW | 19 | (Serbia) Miroslav Grumić | Released (Note: Joined Kisvárda.) |
| Summer | MF | 31 | (Hungary) Dávid Barczi | Released (Note: Joined Videoton.) |
| Summer | MF | 78 | (Hungary) Vladimir Koman | Released (Note: Joined Adanaspor.) |
| Winter | MF | 10 | (Hungary) István Bognár | Ferencváros |
| Winter | MF | 20 | (Hungary) Márk Nikházi | MTK |
| Winter | MF | 25 | (Hungary) Ákos Elek | (Kazakhstan) Kairat |
| Winter | DF | 29 | (Hungary) Milán Németh | Released (Note: Joined Sopron.) |
| Winter | DF | 88 | (Hungary) Pál Lázár | Released |

=== Loans in ===
| Transfer window | Pos. | No. | Player | From | End date |
|---|---|---|---|---|---|
| Summer | FW | 7 | (Hungary) Gábor Makrai | Puskás Akadémia | End of season |
| Summer | FW | 86 | (Hungary) Soma Novothny | (Belgium) Sint-Truidense | End of season |

=== Loans out ===
| Transfer window | Pos. | No. | Player | To | End date |
|---|---|---|---|---|---|
| Summer | GK | 35 | (Hungary) Balázs Egyed | Cigánd | Middle of season |
| Winter | MF | 8 | (Hungary) Bálint Oláh | Zalaegerszeg | End of season |
| Winter | FW | 9 | (Hungary) Patrik Bacsa | Kisvárda | End of season |

== Competitions ==
=== Overview ===
| Competition | First match | Last match | Starting round | Final position | Record | | | | | | | |
| Competition | First match | Last match | Starting round | Final position | Pld | W | D | L | GF | GA | GD | Win % |
|---|---|---|---|---|---|---|---|---|---|---|---|---|
| Nemzeti Bajnokság I | 17 July 2016 | 27 May 2017 | Matchday 1 | 10th | 33 | 10 | 7 | 16 | 39 | 58 | −19 | 30.30 |
| Magyar Kupa | 14 September 2016 | 4 April 2017 | Round of 128 | Quarter-finals | 7 | 5 | 1 | 1 | 12 | 4 | +8 | 71.43 |
| Total | | | | | 40 | 15 | 8 | 17 | 51 | 62 | −11 | 37.50 |

Source: Competitions

=== Nemzeti Bajnokság I ===
==== League table ====
| Pos | Team | Pld | W | D | L | GF | GA | GD | Pts | Qualification or relegation |
|---|---|---|---|---|---|---|---|---|---|---|
| 8 | Debrecen | 33 | 11 | 8 | 14 | 42 | 46 | −4 | 41 | |
| 9 | Mezőkövesd | 33 | 10 | 10 | 13 | 39 | 54 | −15 | 40 | |
| 10 | Diósgyőr | 33 | 10 | 7 | 16 | 39 | 58 | −19 | 37 | |
| 11 | MTK (R) | 33 | 8 | 13 | 12 | 26 | 36 | −10 | 37 | Relegation to the Nemzeti Bajnokság II |
| 12 | Gyirmót (R) | 33 | 5 | 9 | 19 | 21 | 51 | −30 | 24 | Relegation to the Nemzeti Bajnokság II |

Source: Hungarian Football Federation (in Hungarian), Soccerway
Rules for classification: 1) Points; 2) Matches won; 3) Goal difference; 4) Goals scored; 5) Head-to-head points; 6) Head-to-head goal difference; 7) Head-to-head away goals scored; 8) Fairplay; 9) Draw.
(R) Relegated

==== Results summary ====
| Overall | | | | | | | | Home | | | | | | Away | | | | | |
| Pld | W | D | L | GF | GA | GD | Pts | W | D | L | GF | GA | GD | W | D | L | GF | GA | GD |
|---|---|---|---|---|---|---|---|---|---|---|---|---|---|---|---|---|---|---|---|
| 33 | 10 | 7 | 16 | 39 | 58 | −19 | 37 | 8 | 3 | 5 | 26 | 23 | +3 | 2 | 4 | 11 | 13 | 35 | −22 |

Source: Hungarian Football Federation

==== Results by round ====
| Round | 1 | 2 | 3 | 4 | 5 | 6 | 7 | 8 | 9 | 10 | 11 | 12 | 13 | 14 | 15 | 16 | 17 | 18 | 19 | 20 | 21 | 22 | 23 | 24 | 25 | 26 | 27 | 28 | 29 | 30 | 31 | 32 | 33 |
|---|---|---|---|---|---|---|---|---|---|---|---|---|---|---|---|---|---|---|---|---|---|---|---|---|---|---|---|---|---|---|---|---|---|
| Ground | A | H | A | H | A | A | H | A | H | A | H | H | A | H | A | H | H | A | H | A | H | A | A | H | A | H | A | A | H | A | H | A | H |
| Result | W | W | L | L | L | L | D | L | D | L | L | W | D | L | L | W | W | L | W | L | L | L | L | W | D | W | L | W | W | D | D | D | L |
| Position | 3 | 3 | 3 | 6 | 8 | 8 | 8 | 10 | 10 | 12 | 12 | 12 | 11 | 12 | 12 | 11 | 9 | 11 | 9 | 9 | 10 | 11 | 11 | 11 | 11 | 11 | 11 | 11 | 10 | 9 | 9 | 10 | 10 |
| Points | 3 | 6 | 6 | 6 | 6 | 6 | 7 | 7 | 8 | 8 | 8 | 11 | 12 | 12 | 12 | 15 | 18 | 18 | 21 | 21 | 21 | 21 | 21 | 24 | 25 | 28 | 28 | 31 | 34 | 35 | 36 | 37 | 37 |

Source: Matches
A = Away; H = Home; W = Win; D = Draw; L = Loss

==== Matches ====
| 17 July 2016 1 | Videoton | 1–2 | Diósgyőr | Felcsút (Note: The match was played at the Pancho Aréna in Felcsút, instead of Videoton regular stadium, the Sóstói Stadion in Székesfehérvár, built in 1967 which was demolished to make way to the newly built Sóstói Stadion.) |
| 18:00 CEST (UTC+2) | Feczesin 2'; Suljić (yellow card) 42'; Juhász (yellow card) 62'; Pátkai (yellow card) 73' | Report | Bognár 17', 39'; Ternován (yellow card) 43'; Nikházi (yellow card) 56'; Lázár (red card) 80'; Daushvili (yellow card) 82' | Stadium: Pancho Aréna; Attendance: 2,069; Referee: Sándor Andó-Szabó; Assistant referees: Georgiou Theodoros, Péter Kóbor; Fourth official: Balázs Huszár; Goal-line assistants: Csaba Pintér, Katalin Kulcsár |

| 23 July 2016 2 | Diósgyőr | 2–1 | Újpest | Miskolc |
| 18:00 CEST (UTC+2) | Tamás (yellow card) 11'; Oláh (yellow card) 14', (goal) 52'; Antal (yellow card) 27'; Okuka (yellow card) 28'; Elek (yellow card) 49'; Bognár 54'; Nikházi (yellow card) 56' | Report | Mohl (yellow card) 11'; Andrić 28'; Pávkovics (yellow card) 50' | Stadium: Diósgyőri Stadion; Attendance: 6,381; Referee: István Vad; Assistant referees: Vencel Tóth II, László Viszokai; Fourth official: Róbert Horváth; Goal-line assistants: Gergely Szőts, Katalin Kulcsár |

| 30 July 2016 3 | Ferencváros | 6–2 | Diósgyőr | Budapest |
| 20:30 CEST (UTC+2) | Gera (yellow card) 24', (goal) 84'; Nagy (yellow card) 29'; Trinks 33'; Leandro 51'; Djuricin 63', 86'; Dilaver 67'; Šesták (yellow card) 90' | Report | Elek (yellow card) 19'; Okuka (yellow card) 23'; Vela 78'; Bacsa (yellow card) 85'; Tamás 90' | Stadium: Groupama Arena; Attendance: 6,736; Referee: Tamás Bognár; Assistant referees: Georgiou Theodoros, Balázs Buzás; Fourth official: Balázs Farkas; Goal-line assistants: Balázs Berke, Szabolcs Szilasi |

| 6 August 2016 4 | Diósgyőr | 0–3 | Honvéd | Miskolc |
| 18:00 CEST (UTC+2) | Lipták (yellow card) 47'; Nono (yellow card) 90+2' | Report | Eppel 3', 45'; Gazdag (yellow card) 64'; Koszta 90+3' | Stadium: Diósgyőri Stadion; Attendance: 3,797; Referee: Zsolt Szabó; Assistant referees: Vencel Tóth II, Róbert Horváth; Fourth official: Gábor Varga Jr. Goal-line assistants: János Takács, Tamás Nazsa |

| 13 August 2016 5 | Haladás | 3–1 | Diósgyőr | Sopron (Note: The match was played at the Káposztás utcai Stadion in Sopron, instead of Haladás regular stadium, the Rohonci út in Szombathely, which was demolished to make way to the newly built Haladás Sportkomplexum.) |
| 18:00 CEST (UTC+2) | Williams 3'; Má. Németh 20'; Rácz 42', (yellow card) 55'; Iszlai (yellow card) 90+4' | Report | Nono (yellow card) 34'; Lázár (yellow card) 35'; Nikházi (yellow card) 54'; Kitl (yellow card) 62'; Lipták 74' | Stadium: Káposztás utcai Stadion; Attendance: 1,768; Referee: Balázs Berke; Assistant referees: György Ring, Arnold Kepe; Fourth official: Gábor Takács; Goal-line assistants: Viktor Kassai, Attila Molnár |

| 17 August 2016 6 | Paks | 2–1 | Diósgyőr | Paks |
| 19:00 CEST (UTC+2) | Hahn (yellow card) 12'; Lenzsér (yellow card) 34'; Bartha 81'; Bertus 90' | Report | Nemes (yellow card) 43'; Nikházi 64'; Griffiths (yellow card) 83'; Lázár (yellow card) 88' | Stadium: Fehérvári úti Stadion; Attendance: 1,267; Referee: Zoltán Iványi; Assistant referees: Georgiou Theodoros, János Medovarszki; Fourth official: Gábor Kormányos II; Goal-line assistants: Szabolcs Szilasi, László Lovas |

| 21 August 2016 7 | Diósgyőr | 1–1 | Vasas | Miskolc |
| 18:00 CEST (UTC+2) | Bacsa 35'; Elek (yellow card) 67'; Lázár (yellow card) 90+2' | Report | Ádám 37'; Szivacski (yellow card) 61' | Stadium: Diósgyőri Stadion; Attendance: 2,873; Referee: József Erdős; Assistant referees: Gábor Erős, Balázs Szalai; Fourth official: Róbert Horváth; Goal-line assistants: Gergely Szőts, Eszter Urbán |

| 10 September 2016 8 | Gyirmót | 1–0 | Diósgyőr | Győr |
| 18:00 CEST (UTC+2) | Bojović (yellow card) 66'; Sallói 74' | Report | | Stadium: Ménfői úti Stadion; Attendance: 1,400; Referee: Sándor Andó-Szabó; Assistant referees: Attila Kelemen, Balázs Szert; Fourth official: Balázs Farkas; Goal-line assistants: Balázs Berke, Szabolcs Szilasi |

| 17 September 2016 9 | Diósgyőr | 1–1 | Mezőkövesd | Miskolc |
| 18:30 CEST (UTC+2) | Vela (yellow card) 15'; Daushvili (yellow card) 31'; Novothny 68'; Németh (yellow card) 89' | Report | Egerszegi 26'; Sós (red card) 38'; Bačelić-Grgić (yellow card) 75'; Mevoungou (yellow card) 79'; Dombó (yellow card) 90'; Střeštík (red card) 90+8' | Stadium: Diósgyőri Stadion; Attendance: 2,950; Referee: Tamás Bognár; Assistant referees: Péter Berettyán, Dániel Szalai; Fourth official: Gábor Varga Jr. Goal-line assistants: István Vad, Attila Molnár |

| 21 September 2016 10 | MTK | 1–0 | Diósgyőr | Dunaújváros (Note: The match was played at the Dunaújvárosi Stadion in Dunaújváros, instead of MTK regular stadium, the Hidegkuti Nándor Stadion in Budapest, built in 1947 which was demolished to make way to the newly built Hidegkuti Nándor Stadion.) |
| 19:00 CEST (UTC+2) | Poór 33'; Vass (yellow card) 51' | Report | Lipták (yellow card) 30' | Stadium: Dunaújvárosi Stadion; Attendance: 402; Referee: Csaba Pintér; Assistant referees: Attila Kelemen, Balázs Szert; Fourth official: Balázs Huszár; Goal-line assistants: Tamás Bognár, Eszter Urbán |

| 24 September 2016 11 | Diósgyőr | 1–3 | Debrecen | Miskolc |
| 18:00 CEST (UTC+2) | Novothny 57', (yellow card) 59'; Daushvili (yellow card) 59'; Tamás (red card) 87' | Report | Holman 27'; Szakály 37'; Könyves (yellow card) 55'; Brković (red card) 59'; Bobko (yellow card) 75'; Tőzsér 87' | Stadium: Diósgyőri Stadion; Attendance: 4,654; Referee: Sándor Andó-Szabó; Assistant referees: Gábor Erős, Balázs; Fourth official: Gergely Becséri; Goal-line assistants: József Erdős, Ádám Németh |

| 15 October 2016 12 | Diósgyőr | 2–0 | Videoton | Miskolc |
| 18:00 CEST (UTC+2) | Novothny 73'; Lipták (yellow card) 77'; Elek 79'; Nikházi (yellow card) 79' | Report | Lazović (yellow card) 37'; Juhász (yellow card) 73'; Négo (yellow card) 77'; Varga (yellow card) 87' | Stadium: Diósgyőri Stadion; Attendance: 2,472; Referee: Viktor Kassai; Assistant referees: Vencel Tóth II, Dániel Szalai; Fourth official: Róbert Horváth; Goal-line assistants: Ferenc Karakó, Eszter Urbán |

| 22 October 2016 13 | Újpest | 4–4 | Diósgyőr | Budapest (Note: The match was played at the Illovszky Rudolf Stadion in Budapest, instead of Újpest regular stadium, the Szusza Ferenc Stadion in Budapest, due to the renovation work.) |
| 18:00 CEST (UTC+2) | Lázok 22', (yellow card) 57'; Cseke 37', 88'; Mohl (yellow card) 69'; Bardhi 85' | Report | Vela 3', (yellow card) 58'; Nono (yellow card) 34'; Bognár 52'; Lipták 75'; Lázár (yellow card) 81'; Jagodinskis 90+2' | Stadium: Illovszky Rudolf Stadion; Attendance: 2,000; Referee: Csaba Pintér; Assistant referees: László Viszokai, Oszkár Lémon; Fourth official: Péter Kóbor; Goal-line assistants: Szabolcs Szilasi, László Lovas |

| 29 October 2016 14 | Diósgyőr | 2–3 | Ferencváros | Miskolc |
| 17:30 CEST (UTC+2) | Lázár (yellow card) 33'; Novothny 41', (yellow card) 54'; Nono 57'; Nemes (yellow card) 89'; Lipták (yellow card) 90+4' | Report | Jagodinskis 19' (o.g.); Busai 30'; Ramírez (yellow card) 55'; Nalepa 65'; Hajnal (yellow card) 72' | Stadium: Diósgyőri Stadion; Attendance: 8,052; Referee: Zsolt Szabó; Assistant referees: Vencel Tóth II, Georgiou Theodoros; Fourth official: Dániel Szalai; Goal-line assistants: Gergely Szőts, Attila Molnár |

| 5 November 2016 15 | Honvéd | 2–0 | Diósgyőr | Budapest |
| 15:30 CET (UTC+1) | Lovrić (yellow card) 57'; Lanzafame 74', (yellow card) 80'; Koszta 84'; Baráth (yellow card) 86'; Gazdag (yellow card) 88' | Report | Daushvili (yellow card) 72'; Novothny (yellow card) 81' | Stadium: Bozsik József Stadion; Attendance: 1,575; Referee: Viktor Kassai; Assistant referees: Péter Berettyán, Balázs Szert; Fourth official: László Viszokai; Goal-line assistants: István Vad, Gyöngyi Gaál |

| 19 November 2016 16 | Diósgyőr | 2–1 | Haladás | Debrecen |
| 15:30 CET (UTC+1) | Lipták 67'; Elek (yellow card) 87'; Novothny (yellow card) 87'; Ugrai 90+2' | Report | Gaál 13'; Halmosi (yellow card) 63'; Hegedűs (yellow card) 73'; Iszlai (yellow card) 86' | Stadium: Nagyerdei Stadion; Attendance: 1,033; Referee: József Erdős; Assistant referees: Balázs Buzás, János Medovarszki; Fourth official: Balázs Szert; Goal-line assistants: Ádám Farkas, Ádám Németh |

| 26 November 2016 17 | Diósgyőr | 2–0 | Paks | Mezőkövesd |
| 15:30 CET (UTC+1) | Lipták 59', (yellow card) 65'; Elek (yellow card) 66'; Ugrai (yellow card) 80', (goal) 90+2' | Report | Gévay (yellow card) 66'; Koltai (yellow card) 90+3' | Stadium: Városi Stadion; Attendance: 1,769; Referee: Gergely Szőts; Assistant referees: György Ring, Balázs Szalai; Fourth official: Balázs Farkas; Goal-line assistants: István Vad, Ádám Németh |

| 3 December 2016 18 | Vasas | 3–0 | Diósgyőr | Budapest (Note: The match was played at the Bozsik József Stadion in Budapest, instead of Vasas regular stadium, the Illovszky Rudolf Stadion in Budapest, built in 1960 which was demolished to make way to the newly built Illovszky Rudolf Stadion.) |
| 15:30 CET (UTC+1) | Burmeister (yellow card) 47'; Németh 58' (o.g.); Vaskó 61'; Berecz 75' | Report | Lázár (yellow card) 43'; Németh (yellow card) 63' | Stadium: Bozsik József Stadion; Attendance: 2,225; Referee: István Vad; Assistant referees: Gábor Erős, Péter Kóbor; Fourth official: Balázs Huszár; Goal-line assistants: Balázs Berke, Szabolcs Szilasi |

| 10 December 2016 19 | Diósgyőr | 1–0 | Gyirmót | Mezőkövesd |
| 15:30 CET (UTC+1) | Vela 16'; Bacsa (yellow card) 63'; Lipták (yellow card) 72'; Nemes (yellow card) 90+1'; Daushvili (yellow card) 90+3'; Ugrai (yellow card) 90+3' | Report | Présinger (yellow card) 61'; Sallói (yellow card) 63' | Stadium: Városi Stadion; Attendance: 1,569; Referee: Ádám Farkas; Assistant referees: Attila Kelemen, Gábor Varga Jr. Fourth official: Balázs Szert; Goal-line assistants: Péter Solymosi, József Ducsai |

| 18 February 2017 20 | Mezőkövesd | 3–0 | Diósgyőr | Mezőkövesd |
| 15:30 CET (UTC+1) | Balogh 37'; Egerszegi (yellow card) 43'; Bačelić-Grgić 59', (yellow card) 77'; Molnár 81' | Report | Busai (yellow card) 29'; Ugrai (red card) 36'; Makrai (yellow card) 85' | Stadium: Városi Stadion; Attendance: 3,325; Referee: István Vad; Assistant referees: István Albert, Péter Berettyán; Fourth official: Gábor Kormányos II; Goal-line assistants: Sándor Andó-Szabó, Eszter Urbán |

| 25 February 2017 21 | Diósgyőr | 2–3 | MTK | Mezőkövesd |
| 15:30 CET (UTC+1) | Ramos 17' (o.g.); Fülöp 42'; Daushvili (yellow card) 52'; Lipták (yellow card) 61' | Report | Gera 6'; Kanta (yellow card) 46', (goal) 73'; Kolomoyets 53'; Vadnai (yellow card) 68'; Baki (yellow card) 90+2' | Stadium: Városi Stadion; Attendance: 1,646; Referee: József Erdős; Assistant referees: László Viszokai, Gergely Becséri; Fourth official: Dániel Szalai; Goal-line assistants: Péter Solymosi, Tamás Nazsa |

| 4 March 2017 22 | Debrecen | 3–0 | Diósgyőr | Debrecen |
| 15:30 CET (UTC+1) | Feltscher (yellow card) 18', (goal) 60'; Osváth 30'; Ferenczi 33'; Brković (yellow card) 37' | Report | Eperjesi (yellow card) 25' | Stadium: Nagyerdei Stadion; Attendance: 4,214; Referee: Viktor Kassai; Assistant referees: Balázs Huszár, Péter Kóbor; Fourth official: Zoltán Horváth; Goal-line assistants: Tamás Bognár, János Takács |

| 11 March 2017 23 | Videoton | 2–0 | Diósgyőr | Felcsút |
| 15:30 CET (UTC+1) | Vinícius 33'; Jagodinskis 36' (o.g.); Négo (yellow card) 74' | Report | Karan (yellow card) 10'; Novothny (yellow card) 58'; Szalóczy (yellow card) 76' | Stadium: Pancho Aréna; Attendance: 2,455; Referee: Balázs Berke; Assistant referees: György Ring, Georgiou Theodoros; Fourth official: Dániel Szalai; Goal-line assistants: Ferenc Karakó, Eszter Urbán |

| 1 April 2017 24 | Diósgyőr | 3–1 | Újpest | Mezőkövesd |
| 18:00 CEST (UTC+2) | Makrai 19'; Ugrai 32' (pen.); Lipták (yellow card) 54'; Karan 69', (yellow card) 72' | Report | Balogh (yellow card) 14'; Diarra (yellow card) 41'; Lázok 52'; Bardhi (yellow card) 66'; Sanković (yellow card) 89' | Stadium: Városi Stadion; Attendance: 2,295; Referee: Ádám Farkas; Assistant referees: Balázs Szert, Gábor Varga Jr. Fourth official: Balázs Farkas; Goal-line assistants: János Takács, Tibor Gyarmati II |

| 8 April 2017 25 | Ferencváros | 1–1 | Diósgyőr | Budapest |
| 20:30 CEST (UTC+2) | Varga 77'; Lovrencsics (yellow card) 90+5' | Report | Tamás 45+1'; Novothny (yellow card) 53'; Ugrai (yellow card) 57'; Szarka (yellow card) 90+1'; Eperjesi (yellow card) 90+5' | Stadium: Groupama Arena; Attendance: 6,235; Referee: Sándor Andó-Szabó; Assistant referees: Georgiou Theodoros, Balázs Szalai; Fourth official: Oszkár Lémon; Goal-line assistants: Gergely Szőts, Szabolcs Szilasi |

| 11 April 2017 26 | Diósgyőr | 2–0 | Honvéd | Mezőkövesd |
| 18:00 CEST (UTC+2) | Karan 24', (yellow card) 54'; Vela 60'; Busai (yellow card) 90+2' | Report | Vasiljević (yellow card) 81'; Baráth (yellow card) 89' | Stadium: Városi Stadion; Attendance: 2,625; Referee: Tamás Bognár; Assistant referees: Oszkár Lémon, Gábor Takács; Fourth official: János Medovarszki; Goal-line assistants: Ferenc Karakó, János Takács |

| 15 April 2017 27 | Haladás | 2–0 | Diósgyőr | Sopron |
| 18:00 CEST (UTC+2) | Jancsó 27'; Devecseri (yellow card) 50'; Iszlai (yellow card) 66'; Williams 79' | Report | Makrai (yellow card) 11'; Lipták (yellow card) 52'; Busai (yellow card) 66'; Nono (red card) 90'; Tamás (yellow card) 90' | Stadium: Káposztás utcai Stadion; Attendance: 1,743; Referee: István Vad; Assistant referees: Gergely Becséri, Balázs Szert; Fourth official: Gábor Varga Jr. Goal-line assistants: Ferenc Karakó, Ádám Németh |

| 22 April 2017 28 | Paks | 0–1 | Diósgyőr | Paks |
| 18:00 CEST (UTC+2) | J. Szabó (yellow card) 13'; Lenzsér (yellow card) 90+4' | Report | Ugrai 14'; Novothny (yellow card) 54' | Stadium: Fehérvári úti Stadion; Attendance: 1,400; Referee: Tamás Bognár; Assistant referees: Vencel Tóth II, László Viszokai; Fourth official: Oszkár Lémon; Goal-line assistants: Ferenc Karakó, Tibor Gyarmati II |

| 29 April 2017 29 | Diósgyőr | 2–1 | Vasas | Mezőkövesd |
| 18:00 CEST (UTC+2) | Szarka 6', (yellow card) 34'; Karan (yellow card) 25'; Lipták (red card) 74'; Makrai 85', (yellow card) 90+4' | Report | James (yellow card) 32'; Vaskó (yellow card) 42'; Ristevski (yellow card) 57'; Burmeister 71', (yellow card) 76' | Stadium: Városi Stadion; Attendance: 3,656; Referee: Viktor Kassai; Assistant referees: István Albert, Balázs Buzás; Fourth official: Balázs Farkas; Goal-line assistants: Csaba Pintér, Eszter Urbán |

| 6 May 2017 30 | Gyirmót | 1–1 | Diósgyőr | Győr |
| 18:00 CEST (UTC+2) | An. Simon (yellow card) 28'; Radeljić 90+3' | Report | Makrai 2'; Karan (yellow card) 34'; Novothny (yellow card) 67' | Stadium: Ménfői úti Stadion; Attendance: 1,150; Referee: Ferenc Karakó; Assistant referees: Gábor Varga Jr., Balázs Szert; Fourth official: Péter Kóbor; Goal-line assistants: Szabolcs Szilasi, Tibor Gyarmati II |

| 13 May 2017 31 | Diósgyőr | 2–2 | Mezőkövesd | Debrecen |
| 18:00 CEST (UTC+2) | Makrai 48', (yellow card) 51'; Busai 68' | Report | Molnár 13'; Sós 17'; Tujvel (yellow card) 31'; Egerszegi (yellow card) 67'; Szeles (yellow card) 70'; Baracskai (yellow card) 90+1' | Stadium: Nagyerdei Stadion; Attendance: 3,043; Referee: Zoltán Iványi; Assistant referees: Georgiou Theodoros, Balázs Buzás; Fourth official: Róbert Horváth; Goal-line assistants: Ádám Farkas, János Takács |

| 20 May 2017 32 | MTK | 0–0 | Diósgyőr | Budapest |
| 18:00 CEST (UTC+2) | Baki (yellow card) 30'; Okuka (yellow card) 33'; Vass (yellow card) 82' | Report | Mevoungou (yellow card) 53'; Karan (yellow card) 59'; Busai (yellow card) 67' | Stadium: Hidegkuti Nándor Stadion; Attendance: 3,771; Referee: Zsolt Szabó; Assistant referees: Péter Berettyán, Péter Kóbor; Fourth official: Oszkár Lémon; Goal-line assistants: Ádám Németh, Attila Molnár |

| 27 May 2017 33 | Diósgyőr | 1–3 | Debrecen | Mezőkövesd |
| 19:00 CEST (UTC+2) | Ugrai 90+2' | Report | Jovanović 9'; Szatmári 45+2'; Filip (yellow card) 48'; Mészáros (yellow card) 54'; Holman (yellow card) 72'; Könyves 82' | Stadium: Városi Stadion; Attendance: 4,014; Referee: József Erdős; Assistant referees: István Albert, Gergely Becséri; Fourth official: Péter Kóbor; Goal-line assistants: Gergely Szőts, Péter Zierkelbach |

=== Magyar Kupa ===
| 14 September 2016 Round of 128 | Eger | 1–3 | Diósgyőr | Eger |
| 15:30 CEST (UTC+2) | Árvai 67' | Report | Nikházi 8'; Podolecz 17' (o.g.); Novothny 39' | Stadium: Felsővárosi Sporttelep; Attendance: 1,000; Referee: Gergő Bogár; Assistant referees: Gábor Máyer, Tibor Csáky |

| 26 October 2016 Round of 64 | STC Salgótarján | 0–1 | Diósgyőr | Salgótarján |
| 13:30 CEST (UTC+2) | Köböl (yellow card) 82'; Csóka (yellow card) 83'; Híves (yellow card) 90+2' | Report | Jagodinskis (yellow card) 14'; Oláh 45' | Stadium: Szojka Ferenc Stadion; Attendance: 700; Referee: Balázs Böcskei; Assistant referees: Gábor Kovács II, Gábor Máyer |

| 30 November 2016 Round of 32 | Putnok | 1–4 | Diósgyőr | Putnok |
| 12:00 CET (UTC+1) | Nagy (yellow card) 30'; Csirszki 35' | Report | Novothny 31'; Nono 51'; Nemes (yellow card) 55'; Makrai 61'; Elek 73' | Stadium: Várady Béla Sportközpont; Attendance: 1,000; Referee: János Takács; Assistant referees: Balázs Szert, Dr. Judit Kulcsár; Fourth official: László Mencsik |

==== Round of 16 ====
| 14 February 2017 First leg | Cegléd | 0–1 | Diósgyőr | Albertirsa (Note: Cegléd played the 2016–17 season at the Ecsedi László Sportcentrum in Albertirsa, instead of their regular stadium, the Malomtó széli stadion in Cegléd, which did not meet the competition requirements in the Nemzeti Bajnokság II.) |
| 14:00 CET (UTC+1) | Preklet (yellow card) 40' | Report | Busai (yellow card) 15'; Nono (yellow card) 16'; Ugrai 26' | Stadium: Ecsedi László Sportcentrum; Attendance: 300; Referee: János Takács; Assistant referees: Péter Berettyán, Róbert Horváth; Fourth official: Tamás Nazsa |

| 1 March 2017 Second leg | Diósgyőr | 2–0 (3–0 agg.) | Cegléd | Mezőkövesd |
| 18:00 CET (UTC+1) | Karan (yellow card) 23'; Tamás 31'; Ugrai 36'; Nono (yellow card) 48'; Lipták (yellow card) 65' | Report | Jakab (yellow card) 77'; Szabó (yellow card) 90+1' | Stadium: Városi Stadion; Attendance: 236; Referee: József Ducsai; Assistant referees: Gábor Varga Jr., Balázs Szert; Fourth official: Roland Veizer |
Note: Diósgyőr won 3–0 on aggregate.

==== Quarter-finals ====
| 29 March 2017 First leg | Ferencváros | 2–1 | Diósgyőr | Budapest |
| 19:00 CEST (UTC+2) | Dibusz (yellow card) 12'; Sternberg (yellow card) 50'; Böde 65'; Moutari 90+2' | Report | Ugrai 13' (pen.); Nono (yellow card) 50'; Lipták (yellow card) 56'; Szarka (yellow card) 69' | Stadium: Groupama Arena; Attendance: 4,453; Referee: József Erdős; Assistant referees: Péter Kóbor, Balázs Szalai; Fourth official: Krisztián Király; Goal-line assistants: Csaba Pintér, Szabolcs Szilasi |

| 4 April 2017 Second leg | Diósgyőr | 0–0 (1–2 agg.) | Ferencváros | Mezőkövesd |
| 19:45 CEST (UTC+2) | | Report | Moutari (yellow card) 27'; Kleinheisler (yellow card) 59'; Čukić (yellow card) 86' | Stadium: Városi Stadion; Attendance: 2,387; Referee: Zsolt Szabó; Assistant referees: László Viszokai, Gergely Becséri; Fourth official: Róbert Horváth; Goal-line assistants: Tamás Bognár, Ádám Németh |
Note: Ferencváros won 2–1 on aggregate.

== Statistics ==
=== Overall ===
Appearances (Apps) numbers are for appearances in competitive games only, including sub appearances.
Source: Competitions

| No. | Player | Pos. | Nemzeti Bajnokság I | | | | Magyar Kupa | | | | Total | | | |
| No. | Player | Pos. | Apps | Goal | Booked | Sent off (straight red) | Apps | Goal | Booked | Sent off (straight red) | Apps | Goal | Booked | Sent off (straight red) |
|---|---|---|---|---|---|---|---|---|---|---|---|---|---|---|
| 1 | (Hungary) Erik Bukrán | GK | 1 | | | | 1 | | | | 2 | | | |
| 1 | (Hungary) Illés Zöldesi | GK | | | | | | | | | | | | |
| 2 | (Latvia) Vitālijs Jagodinskis | DF | 13 | 1 | | | 4 | | 1 | | 17 | 1 | 1 | |
| 3 | (Hungary) Marcell Mahalek | DF | 3 | | | | | | | | 3 | | | |
| 4 | (Hungary) Márk Tamás | DF | 21 | 2 | 2 | 1 | 4 | 1 | | | 25 | 3 | 2 | 1 |
| 5 | (Hungary) Zoltán Lipták | DF | 28 | 4 | 9 | 1 | 7 | | 2 | | 35 | 4 | 11 | 1 |
| 6 | (Spain) Diego Vela | MF | 31 | 4 | 2 | | 7 | | | | 38 | 4 | 2 | |
| 7 | (Hungary) Gábor Makrai | FW | 29 | 4 | 4 | | 6 | 1 | | | 35 | 5 | 4 | |
| 7 | (Serbia) Dražen Okuka | DF | 4 | | 2 | | | | | | 4 | | 2 | |
| 8 | (Hungary) Bálint Oláh | MF | 9 | 1 | 1 | | 1 | 1 | | | 10 | 2 | 1 | |
| 9 | (Hungary) Patrik Bacsa | FW | 18 | 1 | 2 | | 3 | | | | 21 | 1 | 2 | |
| 10 | (Hungary) István Bognár | MF | 18 | 4 | | | 3 | | | | 21 | 4 | | |
| 10 | (Hungary) Roland Ugrai | FW | 18 | 5 | 3 | 1 | 3 | 3 | | | 21 | 8 | 3 | 1 |
| 11 | (Hungary) Balázs Szabó I | MF | 3 | | | | 3 | | | | 6 | | | |
| 12 | (Hungary) Patrik Lőrincz | DF | 2 | | | | | | | | 2 | | | |
| 14 | (Hungary) Gábor Boros | FW | 1 | | | | | | | | 1 | | | |
| 15 | (Cameroon) Patrick Mevoungou | MF | 9 | | 1 | | 2 | | | | 11 | | 1 | |
| 17 | (Hungary) Miklós Kitl | MF | 6 | | 1 | | 4 | | | | 10 | | 1 | |
| 18 | (Hungary) Balázs Szabó II | FW | 1 | | | | | | | | 1 | | | |
| 19 | (Hungary) Tibor Nagy | DF | 2 | | | | | | | | 2 | | | |
| 20 | (Hungary) Attila Busai | MF | 11 | 1 | 4 | | 2 | | 1 | | 13 | 1 | 5 | |
| 20 | (Hungary) Márk Nikházi | MF | 12 | 1 | 4 | | 2 | 1 | | | 14 | 2 | 4 | |
| 22 | (Croatia) Ivan Radoš | GK | 17 | | | | 4 | | | | 21 | | | |
| 23 | (Georgia (country)) Murtaz Daushvili | MF | 26 | | 6 | | 4 | | | | 30 | | 6 | |
| 24 | (Romania) István Fülöp | MF | 12 | 1 | | | 2 | | | | 14 | 1 | | |
| 25 | (Hungary) Ákos Elek | MF | 18 | 1 | 5 | | 3 | 1 | | | 21 | 2 | 5 | |
| 27 | (Slovakia) Ákos Szarka | FW | 13 | 1 | 2 | | 4 | | 1 | | 17 | 1 | 3 | |
| 29 | (Hungary) Milán Németh | DF | 6 | | 2 | | 2 | | | | 8 | | 2 | |
| 30 | (Spain) Nono | MF | 23 | 1 | 3 | 1 | 6 | 1 | 3 | | 29 | 2 | 6 | 1 |
| 33 | (Hungary) Milán Nemes | DF | 15 | | 3 | | 3 | | 1 | | 18 | | 4 | |
| 48 | (Serbia) Dejan Karan | DF | 11 | 2 | 6 | | 3 | | 1 | | 14 | 2 | 7 | |
| 50 | (Ivory Coast) Georges Griffiths | FW | 8 | | 1 | | | | | | 8 | | 1 | |
| 68 | (Hungary) Ramon Halmai | MF | | | | | | | | | | | | |
| 74 | (Hungary) Patrik Ternován | MF | 4 | | 1 | | 1 | | | | 5 | | 1 | |
| 86 | (Hungary) Soma Novothny | FW | 23 | 4 | 8 | | 5 | 2 | | | 28 | 6 | 8 | |
| 87 | (Hungary) Róbert Tucsa | DF | 2 | | | | | | | | 2 | | | |
| 88 | (Hungary) Pál Lázár | DF | 12 | | 6 | 1 | 1 | | | | 13 | | 6 | 1 |
| 94 | (Hungary) Gábor Eperjesi | DF | 21 | | 2 | | 5 | | | | 26 | | 2 | |
| 98 | (Hungary) Dávid Szalóczy | MF | 1 | | 1 | | | | | | 1 | | 1 | |
| 99 | (Hungary) Botond Antal | GK | 15 | | 1 | | 3 | | | | 18 | | 1 | |
| Own goals | | | | 1 | | | | 1 | | | | 2 | | |
| Totals | | | | 39 | 82 | 5 | | 12 | 10 | | | 51 | 92 | 5 |

=== Clean sheets ===
| | | | Clean sheets | | |
| No. | Player | Games Played | Nemzeti Bajnokság I | Magyar Kupa | Total |
|---|---|---|---|---|---|
| 22 | (Croatia) Ivan Radoš | 21 | 3 | 2 | 5 |
| 99 | (Hungary) Botond Antal | 18 | 3 | 2 | 5 |
| 1 | (Hungary) Erik Bukrán | 2 | | 1 | 1 |
| 1 | (Hungary) Illés Zöldesi | | | | |
| Totals | | | 6 | 5 | 11 |
