= 2015–16 Diósgyőri VTK season =

Diósgyőr
2015–16 season
- Manager: Balázs Bekő (until 14 December); Sándor Egervári (from 29 December)
- Stadium: Diósgyőri Stadion
- Nemzeti Bajnokság I: 9th
- Magyar Kupa: Round of 32
- Top goalscorer: League: Soma Novothny (8); All: Soma Novothny (8)
- Highest home attendance: 8,165 v Ferencváros (24 October 2015, Nemzeti Bajnokság I)
- Lowest home attendance: 1,911 v MTK (2 December 2015, Nemzeti Bajnokság I)
- Average home league attendance: 3,505
- Biggest win: 7–0 v Balatonfüred (Away, 23 September 2015, Magyar Kupa)
- Biggest defeat: 0–5 v MTK (Away, 8 August 2015, Nemzeti Bajnokság I)

The 2015–16 season was Diósgyőri Vasgyárak Testgyakorló Köre's 50th competitive season, 5th consecutive season in the Nemzeti Bajnokság I and 104th season in existence as a football club. In addition to the domestic league, Diósgyőr participated in that season's editions of the Magyar Kupa.

== Squad ==
Squad at end of season

Note: Flags indicate national team as defined under FIFA eligibility rules; some limited exceptions apply. Players may hold more than one non-FIFA nationality.

No.	Pos.	Nation	Player
1	GK	(Hungary) HUN	Illés Zöldesi
4	DF	(Hungary) HUN	Milán Csicsvári
5	MF	(Canada) CAN	Manjrekar James
6	DF	(Hungary) HUN	Gábor Kovács
7	DF	(Serbia) SRB	Dražen Okuka
9	FW	(Hungary) HUN	Patrik Bacsa
10	MF	(Hungary) HUN	István Bognár
16	DF	(Hungary) HUN	Zoltán Lipták
17	MF	(Hungary) HUN	Tamás Egerszegi
18	MF	(Hungary) HUN	Miklós Kitl
19	FW	(Serbia) SRB	Miroslav Grumić
20	MF	(Hungary) HUN	Márk Nikházi
22	GK	(Croatia) CRO	Ivan Radoš

No.	Pos.	Nation	Player
25	MF	(Hungary) HUN	Ákos Elek
26	DF	(Hungary) HUN	Márk Tamás
29	DF	(Hungary) HUN	Milán Németh
31	MF	(Hungary) HUN	Dávid Barczi
33	DF	(Hungary) HUN	Milán Nemes
50	FW	(Ivory Coast) CIV	Georges Griffiths
68	MF	(Hungary) HUN	Ramon Halmai
72	FW	(Hungary) HUN	Gábor Boros
74	MF	(Hungary) HUN	Patrik Ternován
78	MF	(Hungary) HUN	Vladimir Koman
86	FW	(Hungary) HUN	Soma Novothny
94	DF	(Hungary) HUN	Gábor Eperjesi
99	GK	(Hungary) HUN	Botond Antal

== Transfers ==
=== Transfers in ===
Transfer window	Pos.	No.	Player	From
Summer	FW	–	(Hungary) Alex Balogh	Youth team
Summer	FW	–	(Hungary) Zsolt Icsó	Youth team
Summer	MF	–	(Hungary) Bálint Oláh	Youth team
Summer	MF	–	(Hungary) István Timkó	Youth team
Summer	GK	1	(Hungary) Levente Bősz	Youth team
Summer	DF	4	(Hungary) Milán Csicsvári	Youth team
Summer	MF	5	(Canada) Manjrekar James	Free agent (Note: Previous club Pécs.)
Summer	DF	16	(Hungary) Zoltán Lipták	Free agent (Note: Previous club Győr.)
Summer	MF	18	(Hungary) Miklós Kitl	Kecskemét
Summer	DF	26	(Hungary) Márk Tamás	Free agent (Note: Previous club Puskás Akadémia.)
Summer	DF	33	(Hungary) Milán Nemes	Youth team
Summer	GK	35	(Hungary) Balázs Egyed	Youth team
Summer	MF	68	(Hungary) Ramon Halmai	MTK
Summer	FW	72	(Hungary) Gábor Boros	Youth team
Winter	MF	25	(Hungary) Ákos Elek	(China) Changchun Yatai

=== Transfers out ===
Transfer window	Pos.	No.	Player	To
Summer	DF	5	(Brazil) William Alves	Released
Summer	MF	8	(South Korea) Kim Ho-young	Released
Summer	MF	14	(Serbia) Miloš Krstić	Released (Note: Joined Radnički Niš.)
Summer	MF	18	(Hungary) András Gosztonyi	Released (Note: Joined Haladás.)
Summer	DF	21	(Hungary) Gábor Bori	Vasas
Summer	MF	27	(Netherlands) Julian Jenner	Released (Note: Joined Notts County.)
Summer	MF	49	(Hungary) Martin Csirszki	Released (Note: Joined Vác.)
Summer	MF	89	(Serbia) Lazar Marjanović	Released (Note: Joined Borac Banja Luka.)
Winter	GK	1	(Hungary) Levente Bősz	Released
Winter	FW	11	(Serbia) Tamás Takács	Debrecen

=== Loans in ===
Transfer window	Pos.	No.	Player	From	End date
Summer	FW	86	(Hungary) Soma Novothny	(Italy) Napoli	End of season

=== Loans out ===
Transfer window	Pos.	No.	Player	To	End date

== Competitions ==
=== Overview ===
Competition	First match	Last match	Starting round	Final position	Record							
Competition	First match	Last match	Starting round	Final position	Pld	W	D	L	GF	GA	GD	Win %
Nemzeti Bajnokság I	18 July 2015	30 April 2016	Matchday 1	9th	33	10	8	15	37	47	−10	30.30
Magyar Kupa	12 August 2015	14 October 2015	Round of 128	Round of 32	3	2	0	1	9	1	+8	66.67
Total					36	12	8	16	46	48	−2	33.33

Source: Competitions

=== Nemzeti Bajnokság I ===
==== League table ====
Pos	Team	Pld	W	D	L	GF	GA	GD	Pts	Qualification or relegation
7	Paks	33	12	7	14	41	40	+1	43	
8	Honvéd	33	12	7	14	40	39	+1	43	
9	Diósgyőr	33	10	8	15	37	47	−10	38	
10	Vasas	33	9	5	19	32	54	−22	32	
11	Puskás Akadémia (R)	33	7	10	16	35	51	−16	31	Relegation to the Nemzeti Bajnokság II

Source: Soccerway
Rules for classification: 1) Points; 2) Matches won; 3) Goal difference; 4) Goals scored; 5) Head-to-head points; 6) Head-to-head goal difference; 7) Head-to-head away goals scored; 8) Fairplay; 9) Draw.
(R) Relegated

==== Results summary ====
Overall								Home						Away					
Pld	W	D	L	GF	GA	GD	Pts	W	D	L	GF	GA	GD	W	D	L	GF	GA	GD
33	10	8	15	37	47	−10	38	8	3	5	23	20	+3	2	5	10	14	27	−13

Source: Hungarian Football Federation

==== Results by round ====
Round	1	2	3	4	5	6	7	8	9	10	11	12	13	14	15	16	17	18	19	20	21	22	23	24	25	26	27	28	29	30	31	32	33
Ground	H	A	H	A	H	A	H	A	H	A	H	A	H	A	H	A	H	A	H	A	H	A	A	H	A	H	A	A	H	A	H	A	H
Result	W	L	L	L	L	D	W	D	W	L	D	W	L	L	D	L	D	L	W	L	W	L	D	W	L	W	D	D	W	W	L	L	L
Position	3	7	10	11	12	10	9	10	7	7	8	8	8	9	9	9	9	9	9	9	9	9	9	9	9	9	9	9	9	8	9	9	9
Points	3	3	3	3	3	4	7	8	11	11	12	15	15	15	16	16	17	17	20	20	23	23	24	27	27	30	31	32	35	38	38	38	38

Source: Matches
A = Away; H = Home; W = Win; D = Draw; L = Loss

==== Matches ====
18 July 2015 1	Diósgyőr	2–1	Vasas	Miskolc
18:00 CEST (UTC+2)	Kovács (yellow card) 19'; Grumić 28'; Grúz 36' (o.g.); Nikházi (yellow card) 45'; Egerszegi (yellow card) 72'; Takács (yellow card) 79'	Report	Lázok 14'; Osváth (yellow card) 45'; Berecz (yellow card) 55'	Stadium: Diósgyőri Stadion; Attendance: 4,351; Referee: Péter Solymosi; Assistant referees: Róbert Horváth, Attila Kelemen; Fourth official: János Medovarszki; Goal-line assistants: Ádám Farkas, Ferenc Karakó

26 July 2015 2	Ferencváros	3–1	Diósgyőr	Budapest
18:00 CEST (UTC+2)	Nalepa 4', (yellow card) 76'; Leandro 23'; Böde 31'	Report	Egerszegi (yellow card) 27'; Grumić (yellow card) 41'; Barczi 54'; Lipták (yellow card) 87'; Okuka (yellow card) 89'	Stadium: Groupama Aréna; Attendance: 6,027; Referee: Ádám Farkas; Assistant referees: István Albert, László Viszokai; Fourth official: Gábor Varga Jr. Goal-line assistants: Csaba Pintér, Gyöngyi Gaál

1 August 2015 3	Diósgyőr	1–2	Videoton	Miskolc
18:00 CEST (UTC+2)	Koman 9' (pen.), (yellow card) 61'; Nemes (yellow card) 41'; Okuka (yellow card) 44'; Bacsa (yellow card) 70'	Report	Vinícius (yellow card) 9'; Simon (red card) 48'; Maréval (yellow card) 61'; Pátkai (yellow card) 69', (goal) 90+5'; Oliveira 90+3'	Stadium: Diósgyőri Stadion; Attendance: 4,264; Referee: Zoltán Iványi; Assistant referees: Balázs Buzás, Zsolt Szpisják; Fourth official: János Medovarszki; Goal-line assistants: Csaba Pintér, Tamás Nazsa

8 August 2015 4	MTK	5–0	Diósgyőr	Budapest (Note: The match was played at the Illovszky Rudolf Stadion in Budapest, instead of MTK regular stadium, the Hidegkuti Nándor Stadion in Budapest, built in 1947 which was demolished to make way to the newly built Hidegkuti Nándor Stadion.)
18:00 CEST (UTC+2)	Kanta 11', 90' (pen.); Vadnai 30'; Hrepka 59'; Ramos 73'	Report	Kovács (red card) 56'; Lipták (yellow card) 68'; Antal (red card) 88'	Stadium: Illovszky Rudolf Stadion; Attendance: 831; Referee: József Erdős; Assistant referees: Péter Berettyán, Gergely Becséri; Fourth official: László Viszokai; Goal-line assistants: Péter Solymosi, Tamás Nazsa

15 August 2015 5	Diósgyőr	0–2	Debrecen	Miskolc
18:00 CEST (UTC+2)	Lipták (yellow card) 25'; Barczi (yellow card) 29'	Report	Máté 48'; Balogh 62'; Jovanović (yellow card) 82'	Stadium: Diósgyőri Stadion; Attendance: 2,705; Referee: Sándor Andó-Szabó; Assistant referees: Balázs Buzás, Georgiou Theodoros; Fourth official: István Albert; Goal-line assistants: Ádám Farkas, J. Zoltán Kovács

22 August 2015 6	Paks	1–1	Diósgyőr	Paks
18:00 CEST (UTC+2)	Hahn 47'; Kulcsár (yellow card) 51'; Gévay (yellow card) 53'; Szabó (yellow card) 87'	Report	Lipták (yellow card) 5'; Nikházi 51' (pen.), (yellow card) 64'; Halmai (yellow card) 68'; Bacsa (yellow card) 73'	Stadium: Fehérvári úti Stadion; Attendance: 1,187; Referee: Csaba Pintér; Assistant referees: Péter Berettyán, Róbert Horváth; Fourth official: Krisztián Király; Goal-line assistants: Balázs Berke, János Takács

29 August 2015 7	Diósgyőr	2–1	Újpest	Miskolc
18:00 CEST (UTC+2)	Nikházi (yellow card) 16'; Bacsa (yellow card) 33'; Barczi (yellow card) 65'; Bognár 90+2'; Tamás 90+4'; Takács (yellow card) 90+5'	Report	Balogh 14'; Hazard (yellow card) 54'; Nagy (yellow card) 90'	Stadium: Diósgyőri Stadion; Attendance: 4,580; Referee: Tamás Bognár; Assistant referees: Oszkár Lémon, Georgiou Theodoros; Goal-line assistants: József Erdős, Katalin Kulcsár

12 September 2015 8	Békéscsaba	1–1	Diósgyőr	Békéscsaba
18:00 CEST (UTC+2)	Birtalan 18', (yellow card) 43'; Vaskó (yellow card) 47'; Ilizi (yellow card) 78'; Borbély (yellow card) 87'	Report	Lipták (yellow card) 2'; Egerszegi (yellow card) 42'; Okuka 87', (yellow card) 88'; Grumić (yellow card) 89'; Bacsa (red card) 90+3'	Stadium: Kórház utcai Stadion; Attendance: 1,261; Referee: József Erdős; Assistant referees: György Ring, Gergely Becséri; Fourth official: Dániel Szalai; Goal-line assistants: Csaba Pintér, Gábor Oláh

19 September 2015 9	Diósgyőr	3–2	Puskás Akadémia	Miskolc
18:00 CEST (UTC+2)	Okuka 46'; Novothny 66'; Egerszegi 90'	Report	Pekár 81'; Zsótér 86'	Stadium: Diósgyőri Stadion; Attendance: 3,071; Referee: Viktor Kassai; Assistant referees: István Albert, Balázs Buzás; Fourth official: János Medovarszki; Goal-line assistants: Ádám Németh, Tamás Nazsa

26 September 2015 10	Honvéd	2–1	Diósgyőr	Budapest
18:00 CEST (UTC+2)	Vernes (yellow card) 44', (goal) 45+1'; Kamber 90+2'	Report	Barczi 50', (yellow card) 90+1'; James (yellow card) 83'	Stadium: Bozsik József Stadion; Attendance: 2,012; Referee: Zsolt Szabó; Assistant referees: Zoltán Bozó, Krisztián Király; Fourth official: Dániel Szalai; Goal-line assistants: Gergely Szőts, Gyöngyi Gaál

3 October 2015 11	Diósgyőr	1–1	Haladás	Miskolc
18:00 CEST (UTC+2)	Novothny 16'; Tamás (yellow card) 90'	Report	Fehér (yellow card) 15'; Má. Németh 25'; Medgyes (yellow card) 67'; Gaál (yellow card) 75'	Stadium: Diósgyőri Stadion; Attendance: 3,409; Referee: Zoltán Iványi; Assistant referees: István Albert, Zsolt Szpisják; Fourth official: János Medovarszki; Goal-line assistants: István Vad, Balázs Berke

17 October 2015 12	Vasas	0–1	Diósgyőr	Budapest
18:00 CEST (UTC+2)	Könyves (yellow card) 36'; Remili (yellow card) 90+1'	Report	Tamás (yellow card) 68'; Bacsa 70'; Lipták (yellow card) 80'; Okuka (yellow card) 81'; James (yellow card) 88'	Stadium: Illovszky Rudolf Stadion; Attendance: 1,800; Referee: Ferenc Karakó; Assistant referees: László Viszokai, Gergely Becséri; Fourth official: Róbert Horváth; Goal-line assistants: Péter Solymosi, Tamás Nazsa

24 October 2015 13	Diósgyőr	0–2	Ferencváros	Miskolc
17:30 CEST (UTC+2)	Tamás (red card) 17'; Kitl (yellow card) 55'; Nikházi (yellow card) 73'	Report	Šesták 29'; Ramírez (yellow card) 32'; Lamah 79'	Stadium: Diósgyőri Stadion; Attendance: 8,165; Referee: Zsolt Szabó; Assistant referees: Péter Berettyán, János Medovarszki; Fourth official: Attila Kelemen; Goal-line assistants: Zoltán Iványi, Gábor Oláh

31 October 2015 14	Videoton	2–1	Diósgyőr	Székesfehérvár
18:00 CET (UTC+1)	Juhász (yellow card) 45'; Sejben 47'; Négo (yellow card) 49', (goal) 70'; I. Kovács (yellow card) 50'; Suljić (yellow card) 51'	Report	Grumić 44'; Egerszegi (yellow card) 48'; Lipták (yellow card) 48'; Okuka (yellow card) 49'; Eperjesi (yellow card) 65'	Stadium: Sóstói Stadion; Attendance: 2,413; Referee: István Vad; Assistant referees: István Albert, Zoltán Bozó; Fourth official: Balázs Farkas; Goal-line assistants: József Erdős, Csaba Pintér

21 November 2015 16	Debrecen	1–0	Diósgyőr	Debrecen
15:30 CET (UTC+1)	Sidibe 23'; Nagy (yellow card) 31'; Jovanović (yellow card) 45'; Szakály (yellow card) 90+3'	Report	Grumić (yellow card) 33'; Egerszegi (yellow card) 85'	Stadium: Nagyerdei Stadion; Attendance: 2,615; Referee: Zoltán Iványi; Assistant referees: Balázs Buzás, Krisztián Király; Fourth official: Dániel Szalai; Goal-line assistants: Tamás Bognár, Eszter Urbán

28 November 2015 17	Diósgyőr	1–1	Paks	Miskolc
15:30 CET (UTC+1)	Kitl (yellow card) 35'; Grumić (red card) 65'; Okuka (yellow card) 80'; Griffiths 87'	Report	Kesztyűs (yellow card) 25'; Balázs 31'; Lenzsér (yellow card) 41'; Kecskés (yellow card) 86'	Stadium: Diósgyőri Stadion; Attendance: 1,951; Referee: Ádám Farkas; Assistant referees: Vencel Tóth II, Gábor Varga Jr. Fourth official: Dániel Szalai; Goal-line assistants: József Erdős, Tamás Nazsa

2 December 2015 15	Diósgyőr	1–1	MTK	Miskolc
18:30 CET (UTC+1)	Novothny (yellow card) 65'; Bacsa 69'; Kitl (yellow card) 89'	Report	Poór (yellow card) 22'; Torghelle 38'; Ramos (yellow card) 42'; Střeštík (yellow card) 73'	Stadium: Diósgyőri Stadion; Attendance: 1,911; Referee: István Vad; Assistant referees: Balázs Farkas, Dániel Szalai; Fourth official: László Viszokai; Goal-line assistants: Viktor Kassai, Gábor Oláh
Note: The matches of the 15th round were originally scheduled for 7 November 2015, but were postponed due to HFF decision to rest players before the UEFA Euro 2016 qualifying play-offs against Norway by the request of Bernd Storck.

5 December 2015 18	Újpest	2–1	Diósgyőr	Budapest
14:30 CET (UTC+1)	Bardhi 33'; Diagne 88'	Report	Novothny 53', (yellow card) 82'	Stadium: Szusza Ferenc Stadion; Attendance: 2,514; Referee: Csaba Pintér; Assistant referees: Péter Berettyán, Georgiou Theodoros; Fourth official: Zoltán Bozó; Goal-line assistants: Ádám Farkas, Tamás Bognár

12 December 2015 19	Diósgyőr	2–0	Békéscsaba	Miskolc
15:30 CET (UTC+1)	Novothny 28'; Koman 61'	Report	Laczkó (yellow card) 42'; Piermayr (red card) 65'	Stadium: Diósgyőri Stadion; Attendance: 2,661; Referee: Jószef Erdős; Assistant referees: László Viszokai, Attila Kelemen; Fourth official: Gábor Erős; Goal-line assistants: Tamás Bognár, Zsolt Szabó

13 February 2016 20	Puskás Akadémia	1–0	Diósgyőr	Felcsút
15:30 CET (UTC+1)	Pekár 3' (pen.); Lyopa (yellow card) 7'	Report	Barczi (yellow card) 36'; Lipták (yellow card) 90+2'	Stadium: Pancho Aréna; Attendance: 1,627; Referee: István Vad; Assistant referees: István Albert, Oszkár Lémon; Fourth official: Balázs Buzás; Goal-line assistants: Csaba Pintér, Szabolcs Szilasi

20 February 2016 21	Diósgyőr	2–1	Honvéd	Miskolc
15:00 CET (UTC+1)	Bacsa 18', 34'; Kovács (yellow card) 71'; Tamás (yellow card) 81'; Radoš (yellow card) 88'	Report	Ignjatović (yellow card) 23'; Szilágyi (yellow card) 28'; Ikenne (yellow card) 47'; Kamber 69'; Nagy (yellow card) 74'; Gazdag (yellow card) 76'	Stadium: Diósgyőri Stadion; Attendance: 2,991; Referee: Viktor Kassai; Assistant referees: Vencel Tóth II, Zsolt Szpisják; Fourth official: Gábor Erős; Goal-line assistants: József Erdős, Gábor Oláh

27 February 2016 22	Haladás	2–1	Diósgyőr	Sopron (Note: The match was played at the Káposztás utcai Stadion in Sopron, instead of Haladás regular stadium, the Rohonci út in Szombathely, which was demolished to make way to the newly built Haladás Sportkomplexum.)
15:30 CET (UTC+1)	Király (yellow card) 28'; S. Wils 33', (yellow card) 68'; Martínez (yellow card) 39'; Gaál (yellow card) 50'; Ugrai 90+2'	Report	Barczi 29'; Griffiths (yellow card) 87'	Stadium: Káposztás utcai Stadion; Attendance: 2,127; Referee: József Erdős; Assistant referees: Gábor Varga Jr., Gábor Takács; Fourth official: Zoltán Horváth; Goal-line assistants: Ferenc Karakó, Tibor Gyarmati II

5 March 2016 23	Ferencváros	2–2	Diósgyőr	Budapest
18:00 CET (UTC+1)	Gera 10'; D. Nagy (yellow card) 70'; Pintér 85', (yellow card) 90+1'	Report	Bognár 17', (yellow card) 44'; Bacsa (yellow card) 24'; Egerszegi (yellow card) 26'; Okuka (yellow card) 54'; James (yellow card) 60'; Novothny 88'	Stadium: Groupama Aréna; Attendance: 7,144; Referee: Sándor Andó-Szabó; Assistant referees: Balázs Buzás, Zoltán Bozó; Fourth official: Balázs Farkas; Goal-line assistants: Ádám Farkas, János Takács

9 March 2016 24	Diósgyőr	2–1	Videoton	Miskolc
18:00 CET (UTC+1)	Barczi 33'; Tamás (yellow card) 72'; Novothny (yellow card) 87', (goal) 90+2' (pen.)	Report	Pátkai (yellow card) 15'; Suljić (yellow card) 35'; Négo 43'; Oliveira (yellow card) 57'; Haraszti (yellow card) 60'; I. Kovács (yellow card) 73'	Stadium: Diósgyőri Stadion; Attendance: 3,262; Referee: Péter Solymosi; Assistant referees: Gábor Erős, Balázs Farkas; Fourth official: Dániel Szalai; Goal-line assistants: Sándor Andó-Szabó, János Takács

12 March 2016 25	Újpest	1–0	Diósgyőr	Budapest
15:30 CET (UTC+1)	Bardhi (yellow card) 25'; Diarra (yellow card) 40'; Andrić 90+3'; Mohl (yellow card) 90+3'	Report	Nemes (yellow card) 44'; Novothny (yellow card) 62'; Egerszegi (yellow card) 88'	Stadium: Szusza Ferenc Stadion; Attendance: 3,017; Referee: István Vad; Assistant referees: György Ring, Vencel Tóth II; Fourth official: Gábor Takács; Goal-line assistants: Szabolcs Szilasi, Gyöngyi Gaál

19 March 2016 26	Diósgyőr	3–0	Haladás	Miskolc
15:30 CET (UTC+1)	Elek 11', 73', (yellow card) 74'; Novothny 52'; Okuka (yellow card) 69'; James (yellow card) 90+1'	Report	L. Kovács (yellow card) 14'; Ugrai (yellow card) 69'	Stadium: Diósgyőri Stadion; Attendance: 3,072; Referee: Ádám Farkas; Assistant referees: Péter Berettyán, Balázs Buzás; Fourth official: Gábor Varga Jr. Goal-line assistants: Zoltán Iványi, Gergely Szőts

2 April 2016 28	Békéscsaba	0–0	Diósgyőr	Békéscsaba
18:30 CEST (UTC+2)	Punoševac (yellow card) 90+1'; Piermayr (yellow card) 90+2'	Report		Stadium: Kórház utcai Stadion; Attendance: 1,477; Referee: Tamás Bognár; Assistant referees: Oszkár Lémon, Róbert Horváth; Fourth official: Péter Berettyán; Goal-line assistants: Péter Solymosi, János Takács

6 April 2016 29	Diósgyőr	2–1	Puskás Akadémia	Miskolc
19:00 CEST (UTC+2)	Barczi (yellow card) 33'; Koman 38' (pen.), (yellow card) 80'; Elek 40'; Tamás (yellow card) 72'	Report	Mészáros 45'; Kelić (yellow card) 85'	Stadium: Diósgyőri Stadion; Attendance: 3,085; Referee: Ádám Németh; Assistant referees: Zoltán Bozó, Balázs Farkas; Fourth official: Gábor Varga Jr. Goal-line assistants: Ádám Farkas, Tamás Nazsa

9 April 2016 27	MTK	0–0	Diósgyőr	Dunaújváros (Note: The match was played at the Dunaújvárosi Stadion in Dunaújváros, instead of MTK regular stadium, the Hidegkuti Nándor Stadion in Budapest, built in 1947 which was demolished to make way to the newly built Hidegkuti Nándor Stadion.)
18:00 CEST (UTC+2)		Report		Stadium: Dunaújvárosi Stadion; Attendance: 506; Referee: Balázs Berke; Assistant referees: István Albert, Zsolt Szpisják; Fourth official: Balázs Buzás; Goal-line assistants: Zoltán Iványi, Péter Solymosi
Note: The matches of the 27th round were originally scheduled for 30 March 2016, but were postponed to ease the pressure on the tight schedule.

16 April 2016 30	Vasas	1–3	Diósgyőr	Budapest
18:00 CEST (UTC+2)	Ferenczi 80'	Report	Egerszegi 19', 63'; Tamás (red card) 38'; Elek 48'	Stadium: Illovszky Rudolf Stadion; Attendance: 1,552; Referee: József Erdős; Assistant referees: Gábor Erős, Gábor Varga Jr. Fourth official: Balázs Huszár; Goal-line assistants: Ferenc Karakó, Eszter Urbán

20 April 2016 31	Diósgyőr	1–2	Honvéd	Miskolc
19:00 CEST (UTC+2)	Novothny 45'; G. Kovács (yellow card) 53'; Barczi (yellow card) 60'; Grumić (yellow card) 85'	Report	Holender 7', (yellow card) 76'; Kamber 59'	Stadium: Diósgyőri Stadion; Attendance: 3,340; Referee: Zoltán Iványi; Assistant referees: Balázs Buzás, Zsolt Szpisják; Fourth official: Zoltán Bozó; Goal-line assistants: János Takács, Tamás Nazsa

23 April 2016 32	Debrecen	3–1	Diósgyőr	Debrecen
18:00 CEST (UTC+2)	Jovanović 13', (yellow card) 55'; Takács 19'; Bódi 69'; Kulcsár (yellow card) 90+1'; Korhut (yellow card) 90+2'	Report	Okuka (yellow card) 33'; Egerszegi 43'; James (yellow card) 45'; Nemes (yellow card) 67'; Novothny (yellow card) 83'; Lipták (yellow card) 90+2'	Stadium: Nagyerdei Stadion; Attendance: 3,286; Referee: Zsolt Szabó; Assistant referees: Zoltán Bozó, Gergely Becséri; Fourth official: Gábor Erős; Goal-line assistants: Balázs Berke, János Takács

30 April 2016 33	Diósgyőr	0–2	Paks	Miskolc
19:00 CEST (UTC+2)	Nikházi (yellow card) 70'; Okuka (yellow card) 72'; Lipták (yellow card) 90+4'	Report	Kecskés (yellow card) 43', (goal) 90+3'; Bartha 45'; Rodenbücher (yellow card) 69'; Bertus (red card) 79'; Szakály (yellow card) 82'; Báló (yellow card) 90+4'	Stadium: Diósgyőri Stadion; Attendance: 3,268; Referee: József Erdős; Assistant referees: István Albert, Krisztián Király; Fourth official: Dániel Szalai; Goal-line assistants: Balázs Berke, Tamás Nazsa

=== Magyar Kupa ===
12 August 2015 Round of 128	Csorna	0–2	Diósgyőr	Csorna
17:00 CEST (UTC+2)	Babics (yellow card) 18'	Report	Koman 16'; I. Bognár 48'; Halmai (yellow card) 52'; Tamás (yellow card) 68'	Stadium: Kocsis István Sporttelep; Attendance: 400; Referee: J. Zoltán Kovács; Assistant referees: Tamás Kulman, Dr. Péter Szabó

23 September 2015 Round of 64	Balatonfüred	0–7	Diósgyőr	Balatonfüred
15:00 CEST (UTC+2)		Report	Grumić 15', 17', 42'; Bacsa 38'; Bognár 59', 90'; Kovács 71'	Stadium: Balatonfüredi FC Sporttelep; Attendance: 500; Referee: Dr. Gergely Kovács; Assistant referees: Balázs Huszár, Tamás Kulman

14 October 2015 Round of 32	Kozármisleny	1–0	Diósgyőr	Kozármisleny
15:15 CEST (UTC+2)	Beke 48'; T. Kovács (yellow card) 50'; Kiss (yellow card) 68'; Lantos (yellow card) 78'	Report	G. Kovács (yellow card) 18'; Grumić (yellow card) 60'; Okuka (yellow card) 77'	Stadium: Kozármislenyi Stadion; Attendance: 500; Referee: Attila Molnár; Assistant referees: Arnold Kepe, Tamás Kulman

== Statistics ==
=== Overall ===
Appearances (Apps) numbers are for appearances in competitive games only, including sub appearances.
Source: Competitions

No.	Player	Pos.	Nemzeti Bajnokság I				Magyar Kupa				Total			
No.	Player	Pos.	Apps	Goal	Booked	Sent off (straight red)	Apps	Goal	Booked	Sent off (straight red)	Apps	Goal	Booked	Sent off (straight red)
1	(Hungary) Levente Bősz	GK					1				1			
1	(Hungary) Illés Zöldesi	GK												
3	(Bosnia and Herzegovina) Senad Husić	DF	4								4			
4	(Hungary) Milán Csicsvári	DF												
5	(Canada) Manjrekar James	MF	17		5						17		5	
6	(Hungary) Gábor Kovács	DF	18		3	1	2	1	1		20	1	4	1
7	(Serbia) Dražen Okuka	DF	30	2	10		2		1		32	2	11	
9	(Hungary) Patrik Bacsa	FW	28	4	4	1	3	1			31	5	4	1
10	(Hungary) István Bognár	MF	27	2	1		2	3			29	5	1	
11	(Hungary) Balázs Szabó	FW	1								1			
11	(Serbia) Tamás Takács	FW	12		2		2				14		2	
16	(Hungary) Zoltán Lipták	DF	32		10		3				35		10	
17	(Hungary) Tamás Egerszegi	MF	29	4	7		3				32	4	7	
18	(Hungary) Miklós Kitl	MF	15		3		3				18		3	
19	(Serbia) Miroslav Grumić	FW	16	2	4	1	3	3	1		19	5	5	1
20	(Hungary) Márk Nikházi	MF	16	1	5						16	1	5	
22	(Croatia) Ivan Radoš	GK	29		1		3				32		1	
25	(Hungary) Ákos Elek	MF	11	4	1						11	4	1	
26	(Hungary) Márk Tamás	DF	23	1	5	2	2		1		25	1	6	2
29	(Hungary) Milán Németh	DF	8				2				10			
31	(Hungary) Dávid Barczi	MF	32	4	6		3				35	4	6	
33	(Hungary) Milán Nemes	DF	23		3		2				25		3	
35	(Hungary) Balázs Egyed	GK												
50	(Ivory Coast) Georges Griffiths	FW	7	1	1						7	1	1	
66	(Hungary) Kristóf Kövér	MF					1				1			
68	(Hungary) Ramon Halmai	MF	3		1		1		1		4		2	
72	(Hungary) Gábor Boros	FW	2								2			
74	(Hungary) Patrik Ternován	MF	4				1				5			
78	(Hungary) Vladimir Koman	MF	26	3	2		2	1			28	4	2	
86	(Hungary) Soma Novothny	FW	27	8	5						27	8	5	
94	(Hungary) Gábor Eperjesi	DF	11		1		1				12		1	
99	(Hungary) Botond Antal	GK	5			1					5			1
Own goals				1								1		
Totals				37	80	6		9	5			46	85	6

=== Hat-tricks ===
No.	Player	Against	Result	Date	Competition
19	(Serbia) Miroslav Grumić	Balatonfüred (A)	7–0	23 September 2015	Magyar Kupa

=== Clean sheets ===
			Clean sheets		
No.	Player	Games Played	Nemzeti Bajnokság I	Magyar Kupa	Total
22	(Croatia) Ivan Radoš	32	5	2	7
1	(Hungary) Levente Bősz	1		1	1
99	(Hungary) Botond Antal	5			
1	(Hungary) Illés Zöldesi				
35	(Hungary) Balázs Egyed				
Totals			5	3	8
