= Diósgyőri Stadion (1939) =

Sports venue in Miskolc, Hungary

- Sanctuary, Andrassy Street
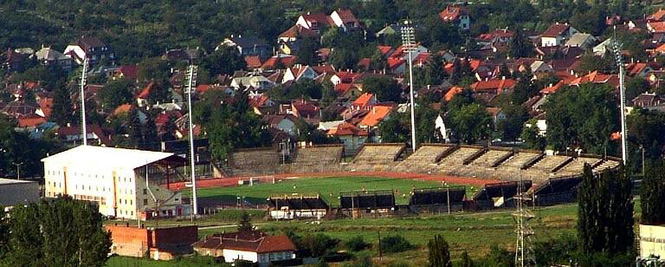
- DVTK Stadium before the new stands
- Interactive map of Diósgyőri Stadion
- Full name: Diósgyőri VTK Sporttelep
- Former names: DFC Stadium, DVTK-Borsodi Stadium
- Location: Andrássy Street; Diósgyőr; Miskolc; Hungary
- Coordinates: 48°5′58″N 20°43′2″E
- Owner: City of Miskolc
- Operator: Diósgyőri Sportlétesítmény Működtető Kht.
- Capacity: 17,000 with 4,641 seats
- Surface: Grass
- Field size: 105 x 68

Construction
- Groundbreaking: 1910
- Opened: 25 June 1939
- Renovated: 2003 (Lighting); 2006 (Main stand); 2010 (New stand)
- Expanded: 26 May 1968
- Closed: 2016
- Demolished: 2016
- Cost: Pengő 625,000 (1939)

Tenant
- Diósgyőri VTK (1910–present)

Diósgyőri Stadion was a multi-purpose stadium in Miskolc, Hungary. It was the playing field of the local football association and was the home of the Diósgyőri VTK. It had a capacity of approximately 17,000.

== History ==
Before the construction of Diósgyőri Stadion in 1939, the DVTK held matches outside of a local diner near the Ironworks. In 1968, the stadium underwent a major expansion and reopened on 26 May 1968 with an increased seating capacity of approximately 22,000 seats, making it the largest stadium in Hungary outside of Budapest. The record for attendance at the stadium was set on 27 November 1968, when approximately 35,000 people converged in the stadium to view the match between Diósgyőr and Ferencvárosi TC. Security concerns prompted ground management to close two sections of the stands, creating a buffer zone between the home and visiting seating, bringing DVKT Stadion's capacity to its current number.

The largest section in the complex is the western Main Stand which was built in 1939. Three other wings with a grass surface and a tartan covered running track were built in 1968, which could hold football matches and athletic championships. The complex contains a grassed surfaced training field built in 1977, one with artificial turf and lighting built in 2006, and two others with cinder covering were opened in the 1960s. Near the stadium, there is a covered training field and a former boxing arena, which was re-opened in 2009 as a soccer field. Although the stadium does not meet the standards of many other European stadiums, it is the most modern arena in Eastern Hungary. Formal lighting was installed in the stadium and began operating on 15 November 2003.

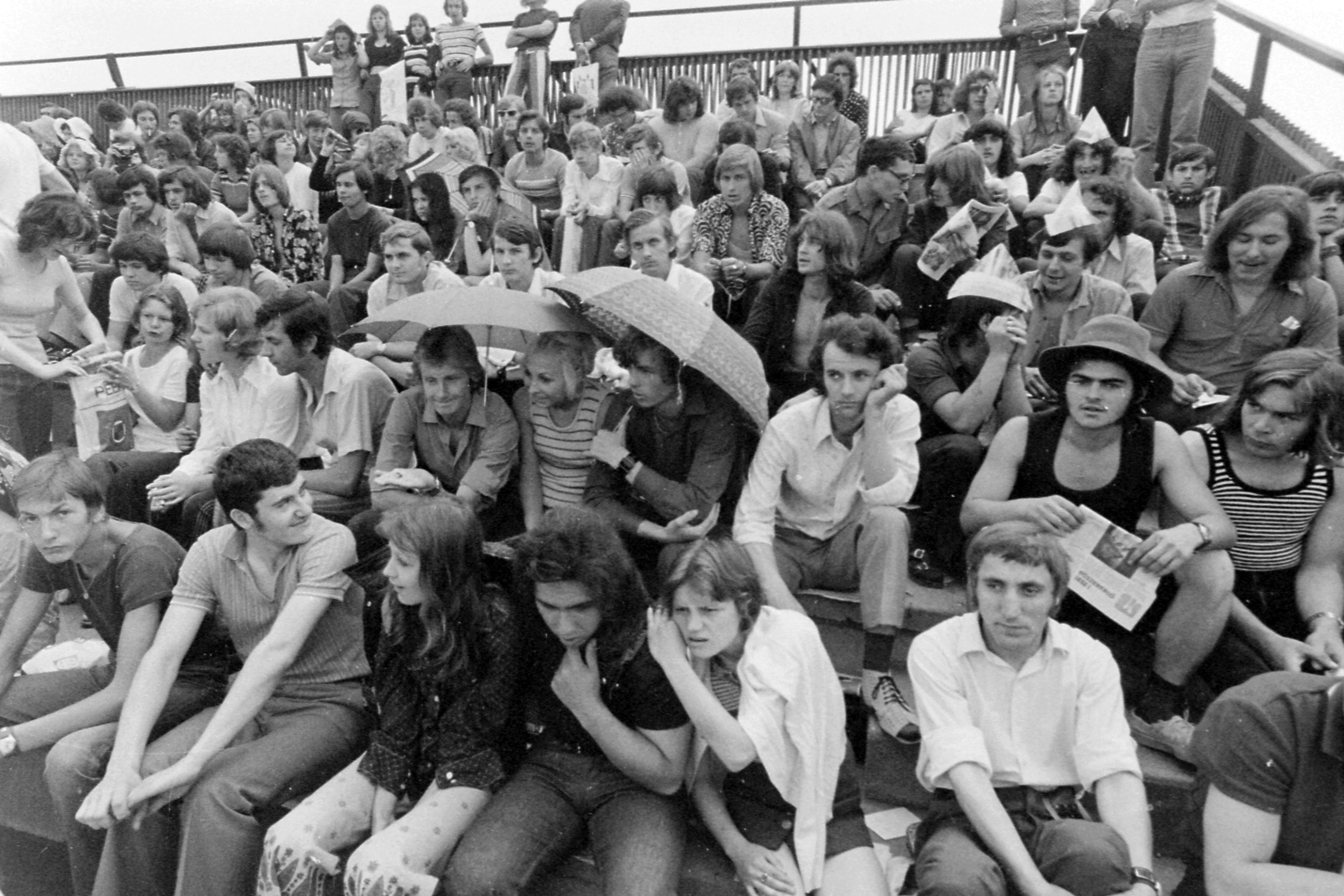
Spectators during a rock festival held at the Diósgyőri Stadion

The Main Stand underwent its first renovation in 2005 and 2006. It re-opened on 23 April 2006 after undergoing a significant modernization process, which included adding a roof and over 1,504 seats. In 2009 and 2010, the eastern wing of the 40-year-old stand was demolished. For the 100th anniversary of the club, new covered stands were built with a buffet, restrooms, and 3,137 seats on the so-called "Sunny wing" or "Napos oldal". The wing was named this because the sun made it difficult for fans to watch matches during afternoon competitions. Construction began on 10 August 2009 and an opening ceremony was held on 6 March 2010. The 2009–2010 renovation cost 400 million HUF. In 2011 and 2012, the training fields were modernized and two additional fields were built. Currently, there are four training fields with lighting, two with natural grass and another two with artificial grass.

From 1992 to 2000, the field was named DFC Stadium due to the team changing its name from DVTK to Diósgyőr Football club. During the 2007–2008 season, the name of the stadium was DVTK-Borsodi Stadium, because of a sponsorship arrangement.

A famous section of the stadium is called the Csáki-stand and is named after a fan called Jozsef Csaki.

=== Reconstruction ===
On 7 October 2013, it was announced that a UEFA stadium category C stadium will be built in "British-style" in Miskolc. 4,5 billion HUF will be guaranteed for the construction by the Hungarian government. The new arena will be able to host about 15,000 spectators. The whole old stadium will be demolished except for the newly built stand. Behind the goals two ne stands will be built which will be able to host 2,800 spectators each, while the new main stand will host 6,000 fans. The may of Miskolc, Ákos Kriza, pointed out that the infrastructure has to be fixed around the stadium.

On 28 November 2013, Ákos Kriza and László Sebestyén announced that the government approved the construction of a new stadium. The available budget for the reconstruction is 4,5 billion HUF.

On 25 February 2014, László Sebestyén, Hungarian Parliament MP, announced that the reconstruction will be started in the summer of 2014. The athletics track will be removed from the stadium. There will be 350 million HUF for a new track at the sports centre of the University of Miskolc. The new stadium will be built in British style i.e. the stands will be as close as possible to the pitch.

On 10 September 2014, the Diósgyőri Stadionrekonstrukciós Ltd. and Ministry of Human Resource (in Hungarian: Emberi Erőforrások Minisztériuma) signed the contract in connection with the reconstruction of the new stadium.

On 18 September 2014, it was announced that, during the reconstruction, Diósgyőr will play their home matches at the Miskolci VSC's stadium in Miskolc.

On 10 October 2014, the demolition of the stands started. Originally the demolition was scheduled on 6 October right after the Diósgyőr-Ferencváros 2014-15 Hungarian League match, which ended with a 2–1 victory over the Budapest rival, but the demolition of the K L and M sectors started only on 9 October.

On 9 February 2015, the new 4 UEFA stadium category stadium became a highlighted project of the Nemzeti Stadionfejlesztési Program (National Stadium Development Program). From the 2015 budget the project will receive 2.75 billion HUF. In addition, the project will receive another 800 million HUF the same year. In 2016, 2.7 billion HUF will be available for the reconstruction.

The new stadium will be able to host 15,325 spectators. There will be 19 skyboxes, 13 buffets, .

== Facilities ==
- Stadium (grass, with tartan running track)
- 2 Training fields (grass)
- 2 Training fields (artificial turf)
- 1 Training field (cinder) not in regular use
- Indoor training field (artificial turf) for U-teams only

== Location ==
The arena can be reached via the mass-transport system of Miskolc from the Tiszai Railway Station by taking the tram No. 1 to the "Stadion" stop, or by bus numbers 1 and 1A from the railway station, or 6 and 29 from Újgyőri Főtér. It can also be reached by car from Budapest on the national road 3 or M30 motorway, turning onto Északi tehermentesítő way in Búza Square, then continuing onto Győri Kapu street.

== Milestone matches ==
25 June 1939	Diósgyőri VTK (Hungary)	6–2	(Hungary) Kispest Honvéd FC	(First match)
		[ Report]		Referee: (Hungary)

29 October 2016	Diósgyőri VTK (Hungary)	2–3	(Hungary) Ferencvárosi TC	2016–17 Nemzeti Bajnokság I (Last match)
	Novothny 41'; Nuno Delgado 58'	Report	Jagodinskis 41' (o.g.); Busai 30'; Nalepa 65'	Attendance: 8,052; Referee: Zoltán Szabó (Hungary)

== International matches ==
Date	Competition	Home	Away	Result
28 September 1977	UEFA Cup Winners' Cup	(Hungary) Diósgyőr	(Turkey) Beşiktaş	5–0
19 October 1977	UEFA Cup Winners' Cup	(Hungary) Diósgyőr	(Socialist Federal Republic of Yugoslavia) Hajduk Split	2–1
30 May 1979	Olympic Pre-qualifying	Hungary	Romania	3–0
3 October 1979	UEFA Cup	(Hungary) Diósgyőr	(Austria) SK Rapid Wien	3–2
7 November 1979	UEFA Cup	(Hungary) Diósgyőr	(Scotland) Dundee United	3–1
14 November 1979	Olympic Qualifying	Hungary	Poland	2–0
24 November 1979	Olympic Qualifying	Hungary	Czechoslovakia	3–0
28 November 1979	UEFA Cup	(Hungary) Diósgyőr	(Germany) 1. FC Kaiserslautern	0–2
3 September 1980	UEFA Cup Winners' Cup	(Hungary) Diósgyőr	(Scotland) Celtic FC	2–1
20 June 1988	Intertoto Cup	(Hungary) Diósgyőr	(Malta) Sliema Wanderers	2–0
11 July 1988	Intertoto Cup	(Hungary) Diósgyőr	(Turkey) Altay Izmir	0–1

== Attendances ==
As of 11 April 2017.

Season	Average
2011–12	7,793
2012–13	5,936
