= Márk Tamás =

Hungarian footballer

Personal information
- Date of birth: 28 October 1993 (age 33)
- Place of birth: Székesfehérvár, Hungary
- Height: 1.92 m (6 ft 4 in)
- Position: Centre-back

Team information
- Current team: Olympiakos Nicosia
- Number: 24

Youth career
- 2004–2011: Videoton
- 2011–2012: Puskás Akadémia

Senior career*
Years	Team	Apps	(Gls)
2012–2013	Videoton	0	(0)
2013–2015	Puskás Akadémia	38	(0)
2015–2020	Diósgyőr	115	(4)
2020–2022	Śląsk Wrocław	47	(1)
2022–2023	Sepsi OSK	19	(1)
2023–2024	Neftchi Baku	31	(0)
2025	Sepsi OSK	4	(1)
2025–2026	Diósgyőr	26	(1)
2026–	Olympiakos Nicosia	8	(1)

International career
2013–2014	Hungary U21	2	(0)
2021	Hungary	1	(0)
- * Club domestic league appearances and goals as of 8 November 2026

Márk Tamás (born 28 October 1993) is a Hungarian professional footballer who plays as a centre-back for Cypriot First Division club Olympiakos Nicosia.

== Club career ==
On 23 July 2023, Tamás signed a two-year contract with Neftçi PFK. On 1 January 2025 his contract with the club was terminated by mutual agreement.

== International career ==
He made his debut for the Hungary national football team on 8 September 2021 in a World Cup qualifier against Andorra, a 2–1 home victory.

== Career statistics ==
=== Club ===
As of match played 17 March 2025

Appearances and goals by club, season and competition
Club	Season	League			National cup (Note: Includes Magyar Kupa, Cupa României, Azerbaijan Cup)		Europe		Other		Total	
Club	Season	Division	Apps	Goals	Apps	Goals	Apps	Goals	Apps	Goals	Apps	Goals
Videoton	2012–13	Nemzeti Bajnokság I	0	0	0	0	—		3 (Note: Appearance(s) in Ligakupa)	0	3	0
Puskás Akadémia	2013–14	Nemzeti Bajnokság I	22	0	3	0	—		1	0	26	0
Puskás Akadémia	2014–15	Nemzeti Bajnokság I	16	0	1	0	—		1	0	18	0
Puskás Akadémia	Total		38	0	4	0	—		2	0	44	0
Diósgyőr	2015–16	Nemzeti Bajnokság I	23	1	2	0	—		—		25	1
Diósgyőr	2016–17	Nemzeti Bajnokság I	21	2	4	1	—		—		25	3
Diósgyőr	2017–18	Nemzeti Bajnokság I	27	1	4	0	—		—		31	1
Diósgyőr	2018–19	Nemzeti Bajnokság I	27	0	2	0	—		—		29	0
Diósgyőr	2019–20	Nemzeti Bajnokság I	17	0	3	0	—		—		20	0
Diósgyőr	Total		115	4	15	1	—		—		130	5
Śląsk Wrocław	2019–20	Ekstraklasa	13	1	0	0	—		—		13	1
Śląsk Wrocław	2020–21	Ekstraklasa	24	0	0	0	—		—		24	0
Śląsk Wrocław	2021–22	Ekstraklasa	10	0	0	0	5 (Note: Appearances in UEFA Europa Conference League)	1	—		15	1
Śląsk Wrocław	Total		47	1	0	0	5	1	—		52	2
Sepsi OSK	2022–23	Liga I	18	1	4	0	—		—		22	1
Sepsi OSK	2023–24	Liga I	1	0	—		0	0	0	0	1	0
Sepsi OSK	Total		19	1	4	0	0	0	0	0	23	1
Neftchi Baku	2023–24	Azerbaijan Premier League	24	0	3	0	4	0	—		31	0
Neftchi Baku	2024–25	Azerbaijan Premier League	7	0	1	0	—		—		8	0
Neftchi Baku	Total		31	0	4	0	4	0	—		39	0
Sepsi OSK	2024–25	Liga I	4	1	—		—		—		4	1
Career total			254	7	27	1	9	1	5	0	295	9

=== International ===
As of match played 8 September 2021

Appearances and goals by national team and year
National team	Year	Apps	Goals
Hungary
Hungary	2021	1	0
Total		1	0

== Honours ==
Videoton

- Ligakupa runner-up: 2012–13

Sepsi OSK

- Cupa României: 2022–23
- Supercupa României: 2023
