= Milán Nemes =

Hungarian footballer (born 1996)

Personal information
- Full name: Milán Imre Nemes
- Date of birth: 27 September 1996 (age 30)
- Place of birth: Miskolc, Hungary
- Height: 1.78 m (5 ft 10 in)
- Position: Defender

Team information
- Current team: Nagykanizsa
- Number: 3

Youth career
- 2002–2003: Diósgyőr
- 2003–2006: Misi (Note: Miskolci Sportiskola (Misi) served as an academy for Diósgyőr at that time.)
- 2006–2014: Diósgyőr

Senior career*
Years	Team	Apps	(Gls)
2014–2018	Diósgyőr	41	(0)
2015–2018	Diósgyőr II	28	(0)
2018–2019	Siófok	26	(0)
2019	FK Csíkszereda		
2019–2020	Putnok	15	(0)
2020–2021	Eger	39	(0)
2021–2022	Nyíregyháza	24	(0)
2022	Nyíregyháza II	2	(0)
2022–2025	Putnok	88	(5)
2025–	Nagykanizsa	2	(0)
- * Club domestic league appearances and goals as of 6 August 2025

Milán Nemes (born 27 September 1996) is a Hungarian professional footballer, who plays as a defender for Nemzeti Bajnokság III club Nagykanizsa.

== Career ==
On 14 July 2015, Nemes as a youth product of Nemzeti Bajnokság I club Diósgyőr were promoted to the first team alongside Balázs Egyed. He made his debut last season, providing two assists in three games.

== Career statistics ==
As of match played 6 August 2025

Appearances and goals by club, season and competition
Club	Season	League			National cup (Note: Includes Magyar Kupa)		League cup (Note: Includes Ligakupa)		Other		Total	
Club	Season	Division	Apps	Goals	Apps	Goals	Apps	Goals	Apps	Goals	Apps	Goals
Diósgyőr	2013–14	Nemzeti Bajnokság I	—		—		1	0	—		1	0
Diósgyőr	2014–15	Nemzeti Bajnokság I	3	0	—		2	0	—		5	0
Diósgyőr	2015–16	Nemzeti Bajnokság I	23	0	2	0	—		—		25	0
Diósgyőr	2016–17	Nemzeti Bajnokság I	15	0	3	0	—		—		18	0
Diósgyőr	Total		41	0	5	0	3	0	—		49	0
Diósgyőr II	2015–16	Nemzeti Bajnokság III	3	0	—		—		—		3	0
Diósgyőr II	2016–17	Nemzeti Bajnokság III	11	0	—		—		—		11	0
Diósgyőr II	2017–18	Nemzeti Bajnokság III	14	0	—		—		—		14	0
Diósgyőr II	Total		28	0	—		—		—		28	0
Siófok	2017–18	Nemzeti Bajnokság II	13	0	1	0	—		—		14	0
Siófok	2018–19	Nemzeti Bajnokság II	13	0	2	0	—		—		15	0
Siófok	Total		26	0	3	0	—		—		29	0
Putnok	2019–20	Nemzeti Bajnokság III	15	0	1	0	—		—		16	0
Eger	2019–20	Nemzeti Bajnokság III	2	0	—		—		—		2	0
Eger	2020–21	Nemzeti Bajnokság III	37	0	2	0	—		—		39	0
Eger	Total		39	0	2	0	—		—		41	0
Nyíregyháza	2021–22	Nemzeti Bajnokság II	24	0	0	0	—		—		24	0
Nyíregyháza II	2021–22	Megyei Bajnokság I	2	0	—		—		—		2	0
Putnok	2022–23	Nemzeti Bajnokság III	31	0	1	0	—		—		32	0
Putnok	2023–24	Nemzeti Bajnokság III	29	3	2	0	—		2 (Note: Appearances in Nemzeti Bajnokság III Promotion play-offs)	0	33	3
Putnok	2024–25	Nemzeti Bajnokság III	28	2	3	0	—		—		31	2
Putnok	Total		88	5	6	0	—		2	0	96	5
Putnok	Putnok total		103	5	7	0	—		2	0	112	5
Nagykanizsa	2025–26	Nemzeti Bajnokság III	2	0	0	0	—		—		2	0
Career total			265	5	17	0	3	0	2	0	287	5

== Honours ==
Diósgyőr

- Ligakupa: 2013–14

FK Csíkszereda

- Liga III – Seria V: 2018–19

Nyíregyháza II

- Megyei Bajnokság I – Szabolcs–Szatmár–Bereg: 2021–22

Putnok

- Nemzeti Bajnokság III – Northeast: 2023–24
