= László Sebestyén =

Hungarian engineer and politician

Member of the National Assembly
- In office 14 May 2010 – 5 May 2014

Personal details
- Born: 22 May 1956 (age 69) Miskolc, Hungary
- Party: Fidesz (since 2002)
- Profession: engineer, politician

László Sebestyén (born 22 May 1956) is a Hungarian engineer and politician, member of the National Assembly (MP) for Miskolc (Borsod-Abaúj-Zemplén County Constituency IV) between 2010 and 2014.

Sebestyén worked for the North Hungarian Regional Waterworks Ltd. since 1981. He became a member of the General Assembly of Miskolc during the 2006 local elections. After the 2010 parliamentary election he was appointed a member of the Parliamentary Committee on Sustainable Development on 14 May 2010. Sebestyén was defeated by Socialist MP László Varga in the 2014 parliamentary election, thus he lost his mandate.
