= Levente Bősz =

Romanian footballer

Personal information
- Date of birth: 6 May 1994 (age 32)
- Place of birth: Budapest, Hungary
- Height: 1.89 m (6 ft 2 in)
- Position: Goalkeeper

Youth career
- –2005: Pilisszentiván SE
- 2005–2012: Újpest

Senior career*
Years	Team	Apps	(Gls)
2012–2014	Újpest II	22	(0)
2013–2014	Újpest	5	(0)
2014–2015	Diósgyőr	8	(0)
2016–2017	Schwarz-Weiß Rehden	9	(0)
2018	Dunaújváros	11	(0)
2018–2020	Vasas	26	(0)
2020–2021	Politehnica Iași	10	(0)
2021–2022	Mezőkövesd	0	(0)
- * Club domestic league appearances and goals as of 13 May 2022

Levente Bősz (born 6 May 1994) is a Hungarian professional footballer who plays as a goalkeeper.

== Club career ==
In November 2020, Bősz joined Politehnica Iași in Romania.

On 21 July 2021, Bősz moved to Mezőkövesd.

== Honours ==
Újpest

- Hungarian Cup: 2013–14
