= Illés Zöldesi =

Hungarian footballer

Personal information
- Date of birth: 9 February 1998 (age 28)
- Place of birth: Nyíregyháza, Hungary
- Height: 1.92 m (6 ft 4 in)
- Position: Goalkeeper

Youth career
- 2009–2013: Nyíregyháza
- 2013–2014: Győr
- 2014–2016: Diósgyőr

Senior career*
| Years | Team | Apps | (Gls) |
| 2016 | Diósgyőr | 0 | (0) |
| 2016–2018 | Videoton | 0 | (0) |
| 2017–2018 | → Kisvárda (loan) | 28 | (0) |
| 2018–2021 | Kisvárda | 2 | (0) |
| 2018–2019 | → Zalaegerszeg (loan) | 36 | (0) |
| 2020 | → Debrecen (loan) | 10 | (0) |
| 2021 | → DEAC (loan) | 12 | (0) |
| 2021 | Debrecen | 0 | (0) |

International career^{‡}
| 2017 | Hungary U-21 | 1 | (0) |
- * Club domestic league appearances and goals as of 9 May 2021 ‡ National team caps and goals as of 15 February 2020

Illés Zöldesi (born 9 February 1998) is a Hungarian football goalkeeper.

== Career statistics ==
As of 9 August 2020.

Appearances and goals by club, season and competition
| Club | Season | League | | | Cup | | Continental | | Other | | Total | |
| Club | Season | Division | Apps | Goals | Apps | Goals | Apps | Goals | Apps | Goals | Apps | Goals |
|---|---|---|---|---|---|---|---|---|---|---|---|---|
| Zalaegerszeg | 2018–19 | Nemzeti Bajnokság II | 37 | 0 | — | | — | | — | | 37 | 0 |
| Zalaegerszeg | Total | | 37 | 0 | 0 | 0 | 0 | 0 | 0 | 0 | 37 | 0 |
| Kisvárda | 2017–18 | Nemzeti Bajnokság II | 28 | 0 | 1 | 0 | 0 | 0 | — | | 29 | 0 |
| Kisvárda | 2019–20 | Nemzeti Bajnokság I | 2 | 0 | 2 | 0 | 0 | 0 | — | | 4 | 0 |
| Kisvárda | Total | | 30 | 0 | 3 | 0 | 0 | 0 | 0 | 0 | 33 | 0 |
| Debrecen | 2020–21 | Nemzeti Bajnokság II | 3 | 0 | 0 | 0 | — | | — | | 3 | 0 |
| Debrecen | Total | | 3 | 0 | 0 | 0 | 0 | 0 | 0 | 0 | 3 | 0 |
| Career total | | | 70 | 0 | 3 | 0 | 0 | 0 | 0 | 0 | 73 | 0 |
