= Miklós Kitl =

Hungarian footballer (born 1997)

- Kitl with Mosonmagyaróvár in 2026

Personal information
- Date of birth: 1 June 1997 (age 29)
- Place of birth: Senta, Yugoslavia
- Height: 1.89 m (6 ft 2 in)
- Position: Defensive midfielder

Team information
- Current team: Mosonmagyaróvár
- Number: 37

Youth career
- 2003–2010: Kiskunmajsa
- 2010–2011: Honvéd
- 2011–2014: Kecskemét

Senior career*
Years	Team	Apps	(Gls)
2014–2015	Kecskemét	27	(4)
2015–2018	Diósgyőr	22	(0)
2018–2020	Dorog	55	(4)
2020–2023	Békéscsaba	80	(4)
2023–2024	Siófok	30	(6)
2024–2025	Ajka	3	(0)
2025–2026	Mosonmagyaróvár	43	(7)
2026–	Sárisáp	3	(1)

International career^{‡}
2015	Hungary U-18	2	(0)
2015	Hungary U-19	2	(0)
- * Club domestic league appearances and goals as of 20 September 2026 ‡ National team caps and goals as of 19 October 2015

Miklós Kitl (born 1 June 1997) is a Hungarian professional footballer who plays as a midfielder for Nemzeti Bajnokság III club Sárisáp.

== Career statistics ==
Appearances and goals by club, season and competition
Club	Season	League		Cup		League Cup		Europe		Total	
Club	Season	Apps	Goals	Apps	Goals	Apps	Goals	Apps	Goals	Apps	Goals
Kecskemét	2013–14	0	0	0	0	1	0	0	0	1	0
Kecskemét	2014–15	27	4	2	0	2	1	0	0	31	5
Kecskemét	Total	27	4	2	0	3	1	0	0	32	5
Diósgyőr	2015–16	15	0	3	0	–	–	0	0	18	0
Diósgyőr	2016–17	6	0	4	0	–	–	0	0	10	0
Diósgyőr	2017–18	1	0	2	0	–	–	0	0	3	0
Diósgyőr	Total	22	0	9	0	0	0	0	0	31	0
Career total		49	4	14	0	3	1	0	0	63	5

Updated to games played as of 9 December 2017
