= Zoltán Lipták =

Hungarian footballer

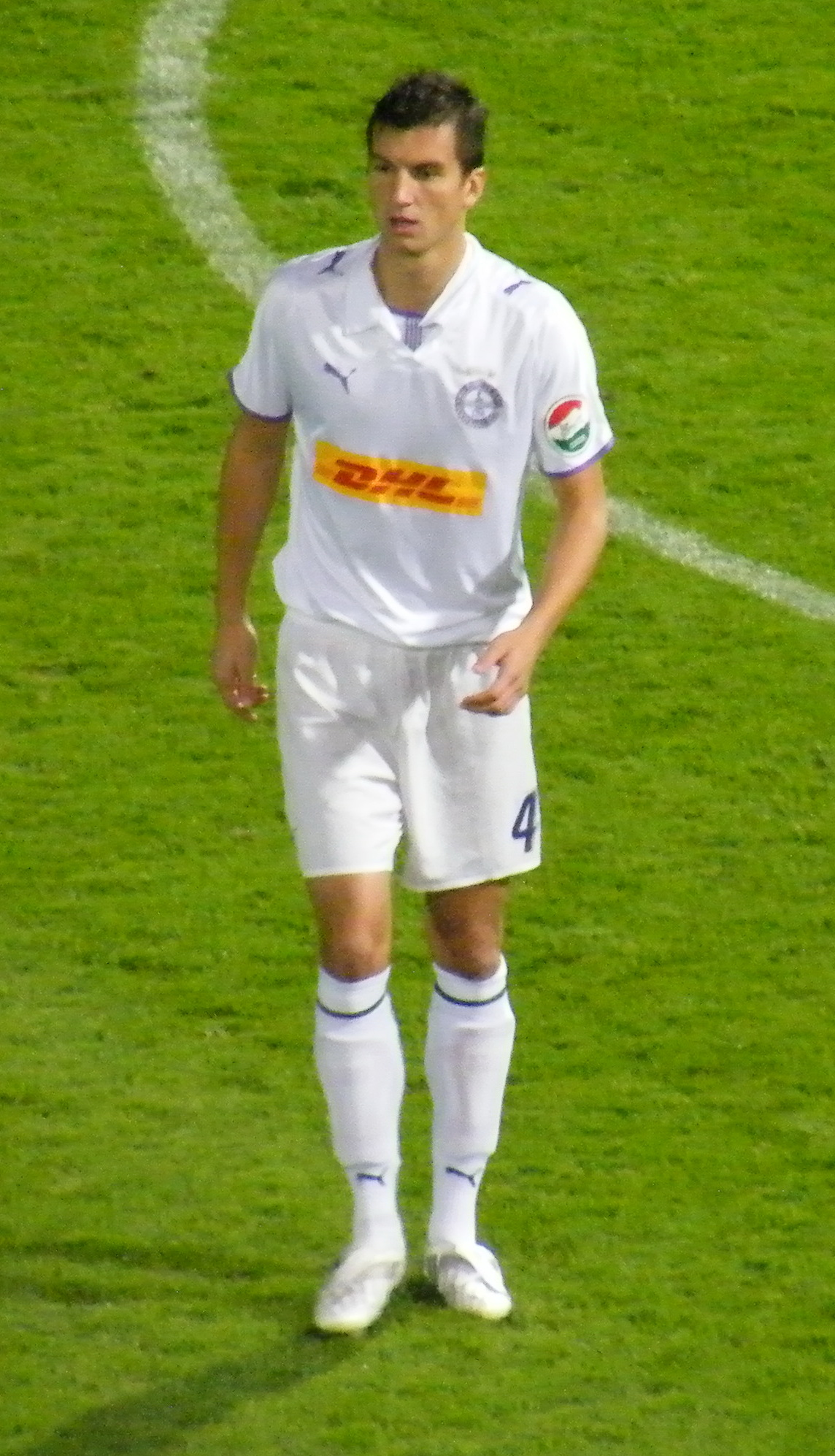

Personal information
- Date of birth: 10 December 1984 (age 41)
- Place of birth: Salgótarján, Hungary
- Height: 1.93 m (6 ft 4 in)
- Position: Central midfielder

Youth career
- Somoskőújfalu
- Salgótarján
- Szolnok

Senior career*
| Years | Team | Apps | (Gls) |
| 2004–2005 | Szolnok | 22 | (1) |
| 2005–2007 | Pápa | 39 | (7) |
| 2007–2008 | Southend United | 0 | (0) |
| 2007 | → Stevenage Borough (loan) | 2 | (0) |
| 2008–2009 | Újpest | 19 | (1) |
| 2009 | → Southampton (loan) | 7 | (0) |
| 2009–2011 | Videoton | 60 | (4) |
| 2011–2012 | Újpest | 11 | (1) |
| 2012–2014 | Győr | 68 | (6) |
| 2014–2018 | Diósgyőr | 90 | (5) |
| 2019–2020 | Gyirmót | 28 | (4) |
| 2020–2022 | Győr | 49 | (9) |

International career
| | Hungary U21 | 15 | (0) |
| 2010–2014 | Hungary | 18 | (1) |
- * Club domestic league appearances and goals

Zoltán Lipták (born 10 December 1984) is a Hungarian former footballer who plays as a central midfielder.

== Club career ==
He had a trial with League One side Huddersfield Town in January 2007, but the supposed end-of-season loan transfer collapsed mysteriously. In July 2007, he had a trial with Southend United, recently relegated into League One. Manager Steve Tilson said he desperately wanted to sign the 6' 4" defender after impressing in a friendly against Witham Town. The permanent signing of Liptak was completed on 24 July 2007 from Hungarian second division side Lombard-Pápa TFC for a fee of £52,000.

Lipták was sent on loan to Stevenage Borough on 22 November 2007 for one month and made his debut in front of the Setanta Sports cameras against Altrincham in the 2–1 win on 26 November 2007. He joined Újpest FC in June 2008. In February 2009, he signed for Championship team Southampton on loan until the end of the season. He made his first appearance for Southampton against Preston North End when they won 3–1. The loan was terminated at the end of April 2009. He has had the honour of winning the Essex Senior Cup with Southend, in which he scored a dubious goal for the Shrimpers in the final against Chelmsford City.

=== Videoton ===
Lipták was signed by Videoton in 2009. He became one of the most important parts of the defense of the club. He won his first Hungarian League title in 2011. During the coaching of György Mezey, he led the club to win the championship. Since the arrival of the Portuguese Paulo Sousa he has been left out from the squad. Although Lipták was a member of the Hungary national football team, he could not play in his club. Therefore, he was released by Videoton a couple of days before the important Euro 2012 qualifier against Sweden. Lipták was not affected by the difficulties of his club and he played well during the two Euro 2012 qualifiers against Sweden and Moldova. He was a member of two important victories of the national side. In September, Lipták was on trial with Premier League club Swansea City.

=== Újpest ===
Lipták signed a contract with Újpest FC.

== International career ==
He has gained 15 under-21 caps for his country. Lipták started his first full international game against England at Wembley Stadium. He played 55 minutes before being substituted, Hungary lost the game 2–1.

== Honours ==
=== Club ===
- Videoton
  - Nemzeti Bajnokság I: 2010–11
- Győri ETO
  - Nemzeti Bajnokság I: 2012–13

=== Individual ===
- Videoton
  - Nemzeti Sport Team of the Season (3): 2009–10, 2010–11 Autumn Season, 2010–11

== International goals ==
| # | Date | Venue | Opponent | Score | Result | Competition |
|---|---|---|---|---|---|---|
| 1. | 7 June 2011 | Serravalle | San Marino | 0–3 | Win | UEFA Euro 2012 qualifying |
