= Botond Antal =

Hungarian football player

Personal information
- Date of birth: 22 August 1991 (age 35)
- Place of birth: Budapest, Hungary
- Height: 2.01 m (6 ft 7 in)
- Position: Goalkeeper

Youth career
- 2000–2007: Újpest
- 2007–2009: Watford

Senior career*
Years	Team	Apps	(Gls)
2011–2014	Kecskemét	33	(0)
2014	Kaposvár	8	(0)
2014–2021	Diósgyőr	104	(0)
2021–2022	Mezőkövesd	4	(0)
2022–2023	Tiszakécske	16	(0)

International career
2009	Hungary U-20	6	(0)
- * Club domestic league appearances and goals as of 31 May 2023

Botond Antal (born 22 August 1991) is a Hungarian football player.

== Club career ==
On 18 June 2021, Antal signed with Mezőkövesd.

On 2 July 2022, Antal moved to second-tier club Tiszakécske.

== Career statistics ==
Appearances and goals by club, season and competition
Club	Season	League			Cup		League Cup		Europe		Total	
Club	Season	Division	Apps	Goals	Apps	Goals	Apps	Goals	Apps	Goals	Apps	Goals
Kecskemét	2010–11	Nemzeti Bajnokság I	3	0	0	0	0	0	0	0	3	0
Kecskemét	2011–12	Nemzeti Bajnokság I	5	0	2	0	7	0	0	0	14	0
Kecskemét	2012–13	Nemzeti Bajnokság I	14	0	1	0	4	0	0	0	19	0
Kecskemét	2013–14	Nemzeti Bajnokság I	11	0	2	0	2	0	0	0	15	0
Kecskemét	Total		33	0	5	0	13	0	0	0	51	0
Kaposvár	2013–14	Nemzeti Bajnokság I	8	0	0	0	1	0	0	0	9	0
Diósgyőr	2014–15	Nemzeti Bajnokság I	25	0	2	0	5	0	4	0	36	0
Diósgyőr	2015–16	Nemzeti Bajnokság I	5	0	0	0	—		—		5	0
Diósgyőr	2016–17	Nemzeti Bajnokság I	15	0	3	0	—		—		18	0
Diósgyőr	2017–18	Nemzeti Bajnokság I	24	0	5	0	—		—		29	0
Diósgyőr	2018–19	Nemzeti Bajnokság I	21	0	0	0	—		—		21	0
Diósgyőr	2019–20	Nemzeti Bajnokság I	1	0	2	0	—		—		3	0
Diósgyőr	2020–21	Nemzeti Bajnokság I	13	0	0	0	—		—		13	0
Diósgyőr	Total		104	0	12	0	5	0	4	0	125	0
Career total			145	0	17	0	19	0	4	0	185	0

Updated to games played as of 20 May 2021.
