= Milán Németh =

Hungarian footballer

Németh Milán
Personal information
- Full name: Németh Milán
- Date of birth: 29 May 1988 (age 38)
- Place of birth: Szombathely, Hungary
- Height: 1.78 m (5 ft 10 in)
- Positions: Left back; centre back

Team information
- Current team: Haladás (staff)

Youth career
- 2002–2005: Haladás
- 2005–2009: Vép
- 2008: → Kaposvár (loan)

Senior career*
Years	Team	Apps	(Gls)
2009–2014	Pápa	71	(0)
2014–2017	Diósgyőr	30	(1)
2017	Sopron	15	(1)
2017–2023	Szombathelyi Haladás	152	(6)
- * Club domestic league appearances and goals

Milán Németh (born 29 May 1988 in Szombathely) is a retired Hungarian football player.

== Career statistics ==
Appearances and goals by club, season and competition
Club	Season	League			Cup		League Cup		Europe		Total	
Club	Season	Division	Apps	Goals	Apps	Goals	Apps	Goals	Apps	Goals	Apps	Goals
Pápa	2008–09	Nemzeti Bajnokság I	0	0	1	0	5	0	0	0	6	0
Pápa	2009–10	Nemzeti Bajnokság I	0	0	0	0	1	0	0	0	1	0
Pápa	2010–11	Nemzeti Bajnokság I	19	0	3	0	2	0	0	0	24	0
Pápa	2011–12	Nemzeti Bajnokság I	17	0	1	0	9	0	0	0	27	0
Pápa	2012–13	Nemzeti Bajnokság I	18	0	2	1	7	0	0	0	27	1
Pápa	2013–14	Nemzeti Bajnokság I	17	0	3	0	8	0	0	0	28	0
Pápa	Total		71	0	10	1	32	0	0	0	113	1
Diósgyőr	2014–15	Nemzeti Bajnokság I	16	1	1	0	2	0	4	1	23	2
Diósgyőr	2015–16	Nemzeti Bajnokság I	8	0	2	0	—		—		10	0
Diósgyőr	2016–17	Nemzeti Bajnokság I	6	0	2	0	—		—		8	0
Diósgyőr	Total		30	1	5	0	2	0	4	1	41	2
Sopron	2016–17	Nemzeti Bajnokság II	15	1	4	0	—		—		19	1
Haladás	2017–18	Nemzeti Bajnokság I	18	0	1	0	—		—		19	0
Haladás	2018–19	Nemzeti Bajnokság I	20	0	2	0	—		—		22	0
Haladás	Total		38	0	3	0	0	0	0	0	41	0
Career total			154	2	22	1	34	0	4	1	214	4

Updated to games played as of 19 May 2019.
