= Dražen Okuka =

Serbian footballer

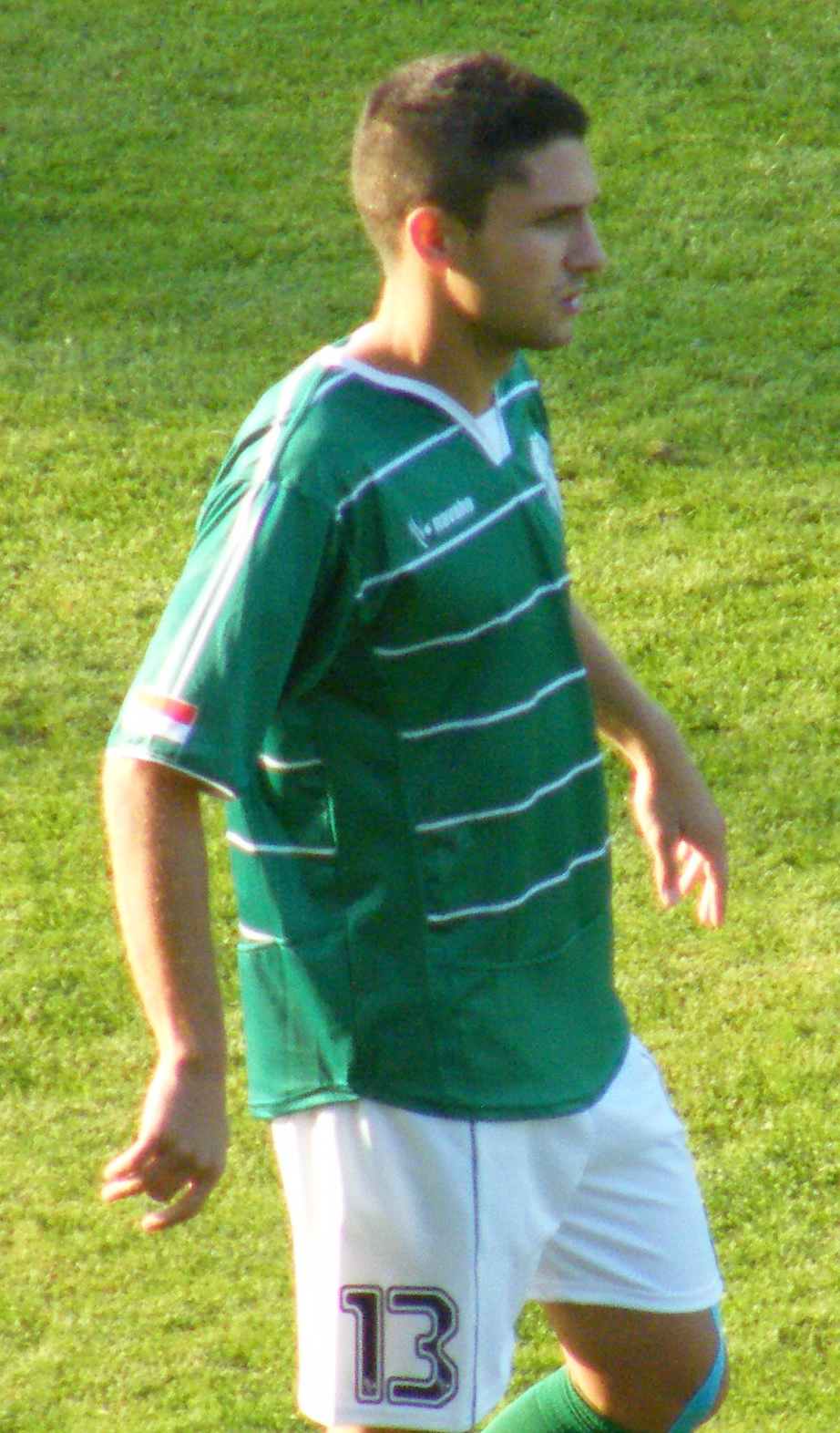
- Okuka with Kaposvár in 2010

Personal information
- Full name: Dražen Okuka
- Date of birth: 5 March 1986 (age 40)
- Place of birth: Örebro, Sweden
- Height: 1.84 m (6 ft 0 in)
- Position: Right-back

Youth career
- Čukarički

Senior career*
Years	Team	Apps	(Gls)
2005–2010	Čukarički	89	(1)
2010–2014	Kaposvár	99	(2)
2012	Kaposvár II	1	(0)
2014–2016	Diósgyőr	62	(3)
2015	Diósgyőr II	2	(0)
2016–2017	MTK Budapest	18	(0)
2017	MTK Budapest II	3	(1)
Total		274	(7)
- * Club domestic league appearances and goals

Dražen Okuka (Serbian Cyrillic: Дражен Окука; born 5 March 1986) is a Serbian retired footballer who played as a defender. He is the son of football manager and former player Dragan Okuka.

During his footballing career, Okuka played for one Serbian club (Čukarički) and three Hungarian clubs (Kaposvár, Diósgyőr and MTK Budapest).
