= Ramon Halmai =

Hungarian footballer

Personal information
- Full name: Ramon Halmai
- Date of birth: 18 April 1994 (age 32)
- Place of birth: Brasschaat, Belgium
- Height: 1.80 m (5 ft 11 in)
- Position: Defensive midfielder

Team information
- Current team: MTK
- Number: 27

Youth career
- 2006–2008: Újpest
- 2008–2013: Haladás

Senior career*
Years	Team	Apps	(Gls)
2013–2014	Haladás	1	(0)
2014–2015	MTK	1	(0)
2015–	Diósgyőr	3	(0)

International career^{‡}
2009–2010	Hungary U-16		
2010–2011	Hungary U-17		
- * Club domestic league appearances and goals as of 5 May 2016 ‡ National team caps and goals as of 1 June 2014

Ramon Halmai (born 18 April 1994) is a Hungarian football player who currently plays for Szombathelyi Haladás. He is the son of former footballer Gábor Halmai.

== Career statistics ==
Appearances and goals by club, season and competition
Club	Season	League			Cup		League Cup		Europe		Total	
Club	Season	Division	Apps	Goals	Apps	Goals	Apps	Goals	Apps	Goals	Apps	Goals
Szombathely	2013–14	Nemzeti Bajnokság I	1	0	0	0	5	0	0	0	6	0
MTK	2014–15	Nemzeti Bajnokság I	0	0	1	0	5	0	0	0	6	0
Career total			1	0	1	0	10	0	0	0	12	0

Updated to games played as of 9 December 2014.
