= Gábor Boros =

Footballer (born 1997)

Personal information
- Date of birth: 26 September 1997 (age 29)
- Place of birth: Rimavská Sobota, Slovakia
- Height: 1.83 m (6 ft 0 in)
- Position: Forward

Team information
- Current team: Tiszaújváros

Youth career
- 2008–2011: ŠK Tempus
- 2011–2012: MŠK Rimavská Sobota
- 2012–2014: Diósgyőr

Senior career*
Years	Team	Apps	(Gls)
2014–2020	Diósgyőr	6	(1)
2017–2018	→ Kazincbarcika (loan)	31	(8)
2018–2019	→ Budafok (loan)	14	(0)
2020–2021	Eger	30	(21)
2021–2022	Mosonmagyaróvár	54	(29)
2022–2023	Tiszaújváros	17	(2)
2023–2025	Putnok	60	(46)
2025–	Eger	26	(14)

International career^{‡}
2015–2016	Hungary U19	3	(0)
- * Club domestic league appearances and goals as of 10 May 2026 ‡ National team caps and goals as of 13 October 2014

Gábor Boros (born 26 September 1997) is a professional footballer who plays for Eger. Born in Slovakia, he made three appearances for the Hungary U19 national team.

== Career statistics ==
Appearances and goals by club, season and competition
Club	Season	League			Cup		League Cup		Europe		Total	
Club	Season	Division	Apps	Goals	Apps	Goals	Apps	Goals	Apps	Goals	Apps	Goals
Diósgyőr
Diósgyőr	2013–14	Nemzeti Bajnokság I	0	0	1	0	3	1	—		4	1
Diósgyőr	2014–15	Nemzeti Bajnokság I	2	1	0	0	1	0	0	0	3	1
Diósgyőr	2015–16	Nemzeti Bajnokság I	2	0	0	0	—		—		2	0
Diósgyőr	2016–17	Nemzeti Bajnokság I	1	0	0	0	—		—		1	0
Diósgyőr	2019–20	Nemzeti Bajnokság I	1	0	0	0	—		—		1	0
Diósgyőr	Total		6	1	1	0	4	1	0	0	11	2
Kazincbarcika	2017–18	Nemzeti Bajnokság II	31	8	1	0	—		—		32	8
Budafok	2018–19	Nemzeti Bajnokság II	14	0	1	0	—		—		15	0
Career total			51	9	3	0	4	1	0	0	58	10

Updated to games played as of 5 August 2019.

== Honours ==
Diósgyőri VTK

- Ligakupa: 2013-14
