= Vitālijs Jagodinskis =

Latvian footballer (born 1992)

Personal information
- Full name: Vitālijs Jagodinskis
- Date of birth: 28 February 1992 (age 34)
- Place of birth: Riga, Latvia
- Height: 1.91 m (6 ft 3 in)
- Position: Centre back

Team information
- Current team: Visakha
- Number: 2

Youth career
- –2009: Daugava Rīga
- 2012–2013: Dynamo Kyiv

Senior career*
Years	Team	Apps	(Gls)
2009	Daugava Rīga	1	(0)
2009–2012	Jūrmala-VV	51	(0)
2013–2016	Dynamo-2 Kyiv	27	(1)
2014–2016	→ Hoverla Uzhhorod (loan)	41	(2)
2016–2017	Diósgyőri VTK	13	(1)
2017–2018	Politehnica Iași	12	(0)
2018–2019	Ventspils	13	(0)
2019–2020	RFS	29	(5)
2020	Valmiera	4	(0)
2020–2024	RFS	91	(4)
2024	Pirin Blagoevgrad	10	(1)
2024–	Visakha	52	(2)

International career^{‡}
2008	Latvia U17	1	(0)
2010	Latvia U19	3	(0)
2011–2013	Latvia U21	17	(0)
2014–	Latvia	34	(0)
- * Club domestic league appearances and goals as of 12:49, 17 May 2026 (UTC) ‡ National team caps and goals as of 27 November 2024

Vitālijs Jagodinskis (born 28 February 1992) is a Latvian professional footballer who plays for Visakha and the Latvia national team as a centre back.

== Club career ==
As a youth player Jagodinskis played for local club FK Daugava Rīga, being promoted to the first team in 2009. He made his Latvian Higher League debut on 1 August 2009, playing 90 minutes in a 3–0 loss to SK Blāzma.

For the second half of the 2009–10 season Jagodinskis moved to FK Jūrmala-VV, establishing himself as a first team player despite his young age. During the three seasons he spent at the club Jagodinskis made 51 league appearances in a period from 2009 to 2011, respectively.

=== Dynamo Kyiv ===
In January 2012, Jagodinskis went on trial with Ukrainian Premier League club Dynamo Kyiv alongside his international teammate Valērijs Šabala. He subsequently signed a long-term contract for four seasons with an option to extend it for another one in February 2012. In 2012, he played in the youth team, but before the start of the 2013–14 Ukrainian First League got promoted to FC Dynamo-2 Kyiv. Jagodinskis made his league debut on 14 July 2013, playing 90 minutes in a 0–0 draw against Desna Chernihiv.

=== Politehnica Iași ===
After ending his contract with Hungarian team Diósgyőri VTK in the summer of 2017, Jagodinskis signed a one-year contract with Romanian Liga I club Politehnica Iași, in October, at the request of manager Flavius Stoican.

== International career ==
Vitālijs Jagodinskis was a member of all of Latvia's youth national teams. In 2008 he played for Latvia U17, in 2010 for Latvia U19 and from 2011 to 2013 he captained the U21 side.

Jagodinskis was called up for the first time to the Latvia national team for the friendly match against Estonia, on 14 August 2013. Since then he has been a regular for the national team.

== Honours ==
Latvia

- Baltic Cup: 2016
