= Patrik Ternován =

Hungarian footballer

Personal information
- Date of birth: 10 June 1997 (age 29)
- Place of birth: Miskolc, Hungary
- Height: 1.87 m (6 ft 2 in)
- Position: Midfielder

Team information
- Current team: Mezőkövesd
- Number: 21

Youth career
- 2007–2009: Tiszaújváros
- 2009–2015: Diósgyőr

Senior career*
Years	Team	Apps	(Gls)
2015–2020	Diósgyőr	14	(0)
2018–2019	→ Balmazújváros (loan)	26	(0)
2020–2021	Tiszakécske	32	(1)
2021–2023	Soroksár	57	(0)
2023–2025	Kazincbarcika	49	(0)
2025–	Mezőkövesd	20	(0)
- * Club domestic league appearances and goals as of 31 May 2026

Patrik Ternován (born 10 June 1997) is a Hungarian professional footballer who plays for Mezőkövesd.

== Career statistics ==
Appearances and goals by club, season and competition
Club	Season	League			Cup		Europe		Total	
Club	Season	Division	Apps	Goals	Apps	Goals	Apps	Goals	Apps	Goals
Diósgyőr
Diósgyőr	2015–16	Nemzeti Bajnokság I	4	0	1	0	—		5	0
Diósgyőr	2016–17	Nemzeti Bajnokság I	4	0	1	0	—		5	0
Diósgyőr	2017–18	Nemzeti Bajnokság I	3	0	2	0	—		5	0
Diósgyőr	2019–20	Nemzeti Bajnokság I	2	0	0	0	—		2	0
Diósgyőr	Total		13	0	4	0	0	0	17	0
Balmazújváros	2018–19	Nemzeti Bajnokság II	26	0	0	0	—		26	0
Career total			39	0	4	0	0	0	43	0

Updated to games played as of 25 August 2019.
