= Tamás Egerszegi =

Hungarian footballer

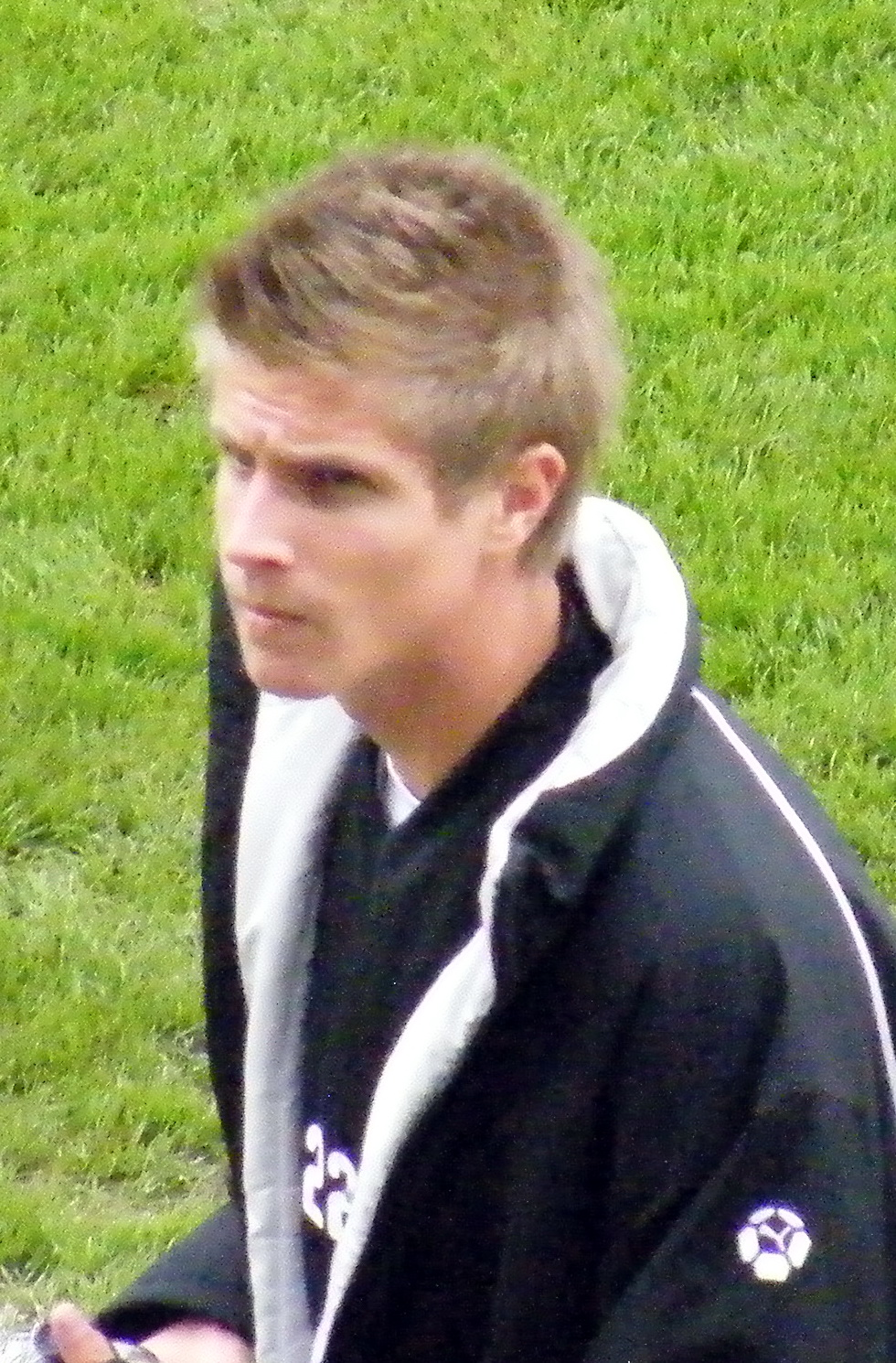

Personal information
- Date of birth: 2 August 1991 (age 35)
- Place of birth: Dunakeszi, Hungary
- Height: 1.85 m (6 ft 1 in)
- Position: Midfielder

Youth career
- 2001–2002: Dunakeszi
- 2002–2010: Újpest

Senior career*
Years	Team	Apps	(Gls)
2010–2014	Újpest	32	(1)
2012	→ Siófok (loan)	22	(0)
2013	→ St. Truiden (loan)	0	(0)
2013–2014	→ Gyirmót (loan)	11	(0)
2014–2016	Diósgyőr	54	(5)
2016–2017	Mezőkövesd	27	(2)
2017–2018	Miedź Legnica	12	(0)
2017	Miedź Legnica II	1	(0)
2018	Vasas	17	(4)
2018–2020	Paks	20	(0)
2019	→ Honvéd (loan)	1	(0)
2020	→ Diósgyőr (loan)	10	(1)
2021	Győri ETO	10	(0)
2021–2023	III. Kerület	72	(4)
2023	Kozármisleny	4	(0)

International career
2010–2012	Hungary U21	4	(0)
- * Club domestic league appearances and goals

Tamás Egerszegi (born 2 August 1991) is a Hungarian former professional footballer who played as a midfielder.

== Career statistics ==
Appearances and goals by club, season and competition
Club	Season	League			Cup		League Cup		Europe		Total	
Club	Season	Division	Apps	Goals	Apps	Goals	Apps	Goals	Apps	Goals	Apps	Goals
Újpest
Újpest	2009–10	Nemzeti Bajnokság I	0	0	1	0	1	0	—		2	0
Újpest	2010–11	Nemzeti Bajnokság I	20	0	3	0	3	0	—		26	0
Újpest	2011–12	Nemzeti Bajnokság I	12	1	2	0	2	0	—		16	1
Újpest	Total		32	1	6	0	6	0	0	0	44	1
Siófok
Siófok	2011–12	Nemzeti Bajnokság I	12	0	0	0	0	0	—		12	0
Siófok	2012–13	Nemzeti Bajnokság I	10	1	2	0	4	1	—		16	2
Siófok	Total		22	1	2	0	4	1	0	0	28	2
Gyirmót	2013–14	Nemzeti Bajnokság II	11	0	1	0	3	0	—		15	0
Diósgyőr
Diósgyőr	2013–14	Nemzeti Bajnokság I	3	0	2	0	6	0	—		11	0
Diósgyőr	2014–15	Nemzeti Bajnokság I	22	1	3	0	3	0	4	0	32	1
Diósgyőr	2015–16	Nemzeti Bajnokság I	29	4	3	0	—		—		32	4
Diósgyőr	2019–20	Nemzeti Bajnokság I	10	1	0	0	—		—		10	1
Diósgyőr	Total		64	6	8	0	9	0	4	0	85	6
Mezőkövesd	2016–17	Nemzeti Bajnokság I	27	2	4	0	—		—		31	2
Miedź Legnica	2017–18	I liga	12	0	4	0	—		—		16	0
Vasas
Vasas	2017–18	Nemzeti Bajnokság I	14	4	0	0	—		—		14	4
Vasas	2018–19	Nemzeti Bajnokság II	3	0	0	0	—		—		3	0
Vasas	Total		17	4	0	0	0	0	0	0	17	4
Paks	2018–19	Nemzeti Bajnokság I	20	0	5	1	—		—		25	1
Honvéd (loan)	2019–20	Nemzeti Bajnokság I	1	0	0	0	—		0	0	1	0
Career total			206	14	30	1	22	1	4	0	262	16

Updated to games played as of 24 June 2020.

== Honours ==
Diósgyőr

- Ligakupa: 2013–14
