= Soma Novothny =

Hungarian footballer (born 1994)

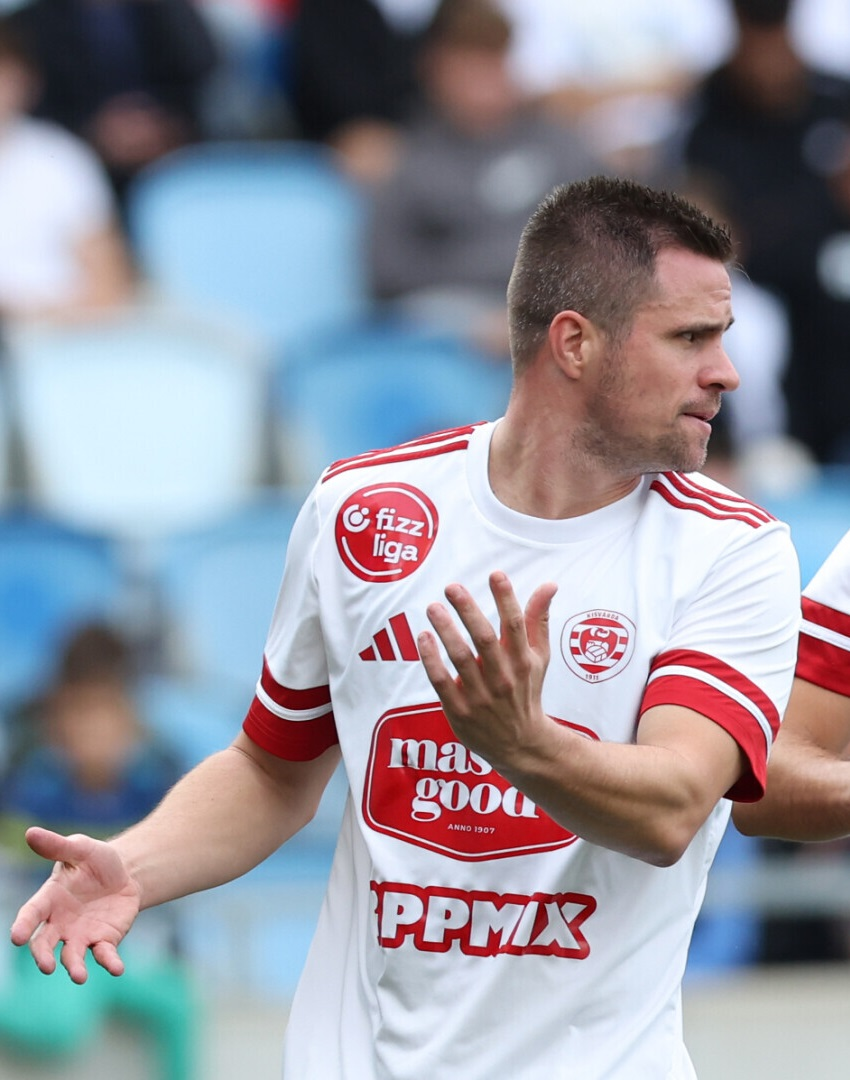
- Novothny playing for Kisvárda in 2025

Personal information
- Full name: Soma Zsombor Novothny
- Date of birth: 16 June 1994 (age 32)
- Place of birth: Veszprém, Hungary
- Height: 1.86 m (6 ft 1 in)
- Position: Forward

Team information
- Current team: Kisvárda
- Number: 86

Youth career
- 1999–2011: Veszprém
- 2012–2013: Napoli

Senior career*
Years	Team	Apps	(Gls)
2009–2011	Veszprém	35	(17)
2012–2016	Napoli	0	(0)
2013–2014	→ Paganese (loan)	24	(2)
2014	→ Mantova (loan)	13	(0)
2015	→ Südtirol (loan)	18	(4)
2015–2016	→ Diósgyőr (loan)	27	(8)
2016–2017	Sint-Truidense	0	(0)
2016–2017	→ Diósgyőr (loan)	23	(4)
2017–2020	Újpest	71	(32)
2019	→ Busan IPark (loan)	27	(12)
2020–2022	VfL Bochum	20	(3)
2022	Anorthosis Famagusta	16	(2)
2022–2024	Vasas SC	42	(12)
2024–2025	Ruch Chorzów	41	(11)
2025–	Kisvárda	32	(3)

International career
2010	Hungary U16	2	(0)
2010–2011	Hungary U17	3	(1)
2011–2012	Hungary U18	4	(2)
2012–2013	Hungary U19	8	(1)
2015	Hungary U21	4	(0)
- * Club domestic league appearances and goals as of 30 May 2026

Soma Zsombor Novothny (born 16 June 1994) is a Hungarian professional footballer who plays as a forward for Nemzeti Bajnokság I club Kisvárda.

== Club career ==
=== Paganese ===
On 2 September 2013, Napoli loaned Novothny out to Lega Pro Prima Divisione club Paganese to provide him with more opportunities for playing time. Napoli had the option of ending the loan prematurely.

=== Mantova ===
On 10 September 2014, Novothny made his debut for Lega Pro Prima Divisione club Mantova in a goalless draw against Lumezzane, coming onto the pitch in the 73rd minute.

=== Südtirol ===
On 5 January 2015, Novothny was loaned to Lega Pro Prima Divisione club Südtirol for the second half of the 2014–15 season. His coach was going to be his former Napoli coach Adolfo Sormani.

On 6 January 2015, Novothny made his first appearance for Südtirol against Arezzo Calcio, scoring twice in 4–3 home win.

=== Diósgyőr ===
On 19 August 2015, it was officially announced that Novothny signed for Hungarian side Diósgyőri for a one-year loan deal.

=== Busan IPark ===
On 20 Match 2019, it was officially announced that Novothny was loaned to Busan IPark.

=== VfL Bochum ===
On 7 September 2020, Novothny moved to German outfit VfL Bochum on a deal until June 2022.

On 3 January 2022, "Novothny approached us with the desire to terminate his contract early to pursue a new challenge. We have complied with this request, and thank him for his commitment and wish him all the best," said VfL's Managing Director of Sport Sebastian Schindzielorz.

=== Anorthosis Famagusta ===
On 3 January 2022, it was officially announced that Novothny signed for Anorthosis Famagusta until June 2023.

=== Vasas SC ===
On 15 June 2022, it was announced by newly promoted Vasas that they had signed Novothny until June 2025 on a free transfer.

=== Ruch Chorzów ===
On 21 February 2024, Novothny joined Polish club Ruch Chorzów on a deal until the end of the season, with an option for another year. On 24 June 2024, his deal was extended for a further three years.

=== Kisvárda ===
On 26 June 2025, Novothny was transferred to Hungarian club Kisvárda.

== Career statistics ==
As of match played 25 May 2025

Appearances and goals by club, season and competition
Club	Season	League			National cup (Note: Includes Magyar Kupa, Korean FA Cup, DFB-Pokal, Cypriot Cup, Polish Cup)		Continental		Other		Total	
Club	Season	Division	Apps	Goals	Apps	Goals	Apps	Goals	Apps	Goals	Apps	Goals
Veszprém	2009–10	Nemzeti Bajnokság III	19	7	1	1	—		0	0	20	8
Veszprém	2010–11	Nemzeti Bajnokság II	3	1	0	0	—		0	0	3	1
Veszprém	2011–12	Nemzeti Bajnokság II	13	9	3	4	—		0	0	16	13
Veszprém	Total		35	17	4	5	0	0	0	0	39	22
Napoli	2012–13	Serie A	0	0	0	0	0	0	0	0	0	0
Paganese Calcio (loan)	2013–14	Lega Pro Prima Divisione	24	2	0	0	0	0	0	0	24	2
Mantova (loan)	2014–15	Lega Pro	13	0	0	0	—		0	0	13	0
Südtirol (loan)	2014–15	Lega Pro	18	4	0	0	—		0	0	18	4
Diósgyőr (loan)	2015–16	Nemzeti Bajnokság I	27	8	0	0	0	0	0	0	27	8
Sint-Truidense	2016–17	Belgian First Division A	0	0	0	0	0	0	0	0	0	0
Diósgyőr (loan)	2016–17	Nemzeti Bajnokság I	23	4	5	2	0	0	0	0	28	6
Újpest	2017–18	Nemzeti Bajnokság I	31	17	7	2	0	0	0	0	38	19
Újpest	2018–19	Nemzeti Bajnokság I	23	9	3	0	4 (Note: Appearances in UEFA Europa League)	0	0	0	30	9
Újpest	2019–20	Nemzeti Bajnokság I	17	6	2	0	0	0	0	0	19	6
Újpest	Total		71	32	12	2	4	0	0	0	87	34
Busan IPark (loan)	2019	K League 2	27	12	1	0	—		2 (Note: Appearances in K League 1 promotion play-offs)	1	30	13
VfL Bochum	2020–21	2. Bundesliga	14	2	1	0	—		0	0	15	2
VfL Bochum	2021–22	Bundesliga	6	1	0	0	—		0	0	6	1
VfL Bochum	Total		20	3	1	0	0	0	0	0	21	3
Anorthosis Famagusta	2021–22	Cypriot First Division	16	2	6	0	0	0	0	0	22	2
Vasas	2022–23	Nemzeti Bajnokság I	25	5	5	1	—		—		30	6
Vasas	2023–24	Nemzeti Bajnokság II	17	7	2	1	—		—		19	8
Vasas	Total		42	12	7	2	—		—		49	14
Ruch Chorzów	2023–24	Ekstraklasa	13	4	—		—		—		13	4
Ruch Chorzów	2024–25	I liga	28	7	4	1	—		—		32	8
Ruch Chorzów	Total		41	11	4	1	—		—		45	12
Career total			357	107	40	12	4	0	2	1	403	120
