= 2013–14 Diósgyőri VTK season =

Diósgyőri VTK
2013–14 season
- Chairman: (Hungary) Hunor Dudás
- Manager: (Serbia) Tomislav Sivić
- NB 1: 5th
- Hungarian Cup: Runners-up
- Hungarian League Cup: Winner
- Top goalscorer: League: (Hungary) Márkó Futács (9); All: (Hungary) Patrik Bacsa (17)
- Highest home attendance: 9,271 vs Ferencváros (2 November 2013)
- Lowest home attendance: 400 vs Kisvárda (20 November 2013)
Home colours	Away colours

The 2013–14 season will be Diósgyőri VTK's 48th competitive season, 3rd consecutive season in the OTP Bank Liga and 103rd year in existence as a football club.

== First team squad ==
Note: Flags indicate national team as defined under FIFA eligibility rules; some limited exceptions apply. Players may hold more than one non-FIFA nationality.

No.	Pos.	Nation	Player
1	GK	SRB	Nenad Rajić
3	DF	BIH	Senad Husić
4	DF	HUN	Tamás Kádár
5	DF	BRA	William Alves
6	DF	HUN	Gergő Gohér
7	FW	SRB	Miroslav Grumić
9	FW	HUN	Patrik Bacsa
10	MF	CMR	Mohamadolu Abdouraman
11	MF	SRB	Zoran Kostić
14	DF	HUN	András Debreceni
15	DF	HUN	András Vági
17	MF	HUN	Tamás Egerszegi

No.	Pos.	Nation	Player
18	MF	HUN	András Gosztonyi
20	MF	HUN	Márk Nikházi
21	MF	HUN	Martin Csirszki
22	GK	CRO	Ivan Radoš
23	DF	HUN	Viktor Vadász
25	MF	HUN	Ákos Elek
31	MF	HUN	Dávid Barczi
81	MF	HUN	Balázs Szabó
88	FW	ECU	Augusto Batioja
89	MF	SRB	Lazar Marjanović
94	DF	HUN	Gábor Eperjesi
99	FW	HUN	Márkó Futács (loan from Leicester City)

== Transfers ==
=== Summer ===
In: Note: Flags indicate national team as defined under FIFA eligibility rules; some limited exceptions apply. Players may hold more than one non-FIFA nationality.

No.	Pos.	Nation	Player
1	GK	SRB	Nenad Rajić (from (Bosnia and Herzegovina) Leotar)
3	DF	BIH	Senad Husić (from (Bosnia and Herzegovina) Zvijezda)
4	DF	HUN	Tamás Kádár (from (Netherlands) Roda)
5	DF	BRA	William Alves (from (Brazil) Tombense)
11	MF	SRB	Zoran Kostić (from (Kazakhstan) Zhetysu)
14	DF	HUN	András Debreceni (from Honvéd)
20	MF	HUN	Márk Nikházi (from MTK)
22	GK	CRO	Ivan Radoš (loan return from (Azerbaijan) Kapaz)
31	MF	HUN	Dávid Barczi (from Diósgyőr)
35	MF	BRA	Thiago Bonfim (from (Brazil) Bahia)
55	GK	HUN	Vince Gelei (from Csákvár)
88	FW	ECU	Augusto Batioja (from (Montenegro) Mladost)
91	MF	HUN	Péter Bogáti (loan return from Kazincbarcika)
99	FW	HUN	Márkó Futács (loan from (England) Leicester City)

Out: Note: Flags indicate national team as defined under FIFA eligibility rules; some limited exceptions apply. Players may hold more than one non-FIFA nationality.

No.	Pos.	Nation	Player
1	GK	HUN	Norbert Tajti (to Siófok)
4	DF	HUN	Tamás Kádár (loan return to (Netherlands) Roda)
7	MF	ESP	Francisco Gallardo (to Puskás)
12	GK	SVK	Ladislav Rybánsky (to (Poland) Bielsko-Biała)
14	DF	HUN	Tamás Nagy (to Pápa)
17	FW	HUN	Gergely Rudolf (to Győr)
20	MF	ESP	Fernando (end of career)
63	GK	HUN	Róbert Ambrusics
77	MF	ESP	José Luque (end of career)
88	FW	FRA	L´Imam Seydi (to Debrecen)
91	MF	HUN	Péter Bogáti (to Siófok)
98	MF	MAR	Youssef Sekour (to Pápa)

=== Winter ===
In: Note: Flags indicate national team as defined under FIFA eligibility rules; some limited exceptions apply. Players may hold more than one non-FIFA nationality.

No.	Pos.	Nation	Player
7	FW	SRB	Miroslav Grumić (from Pécs)
17	MF	HUN	Tamás Egerszegi (from Újpest)
89	MF	SRB	Lazar Marjanović (from (Serbia) Radnički Kragujevac)

Out: Note: Flags indicate national team as defined under FIFA eligibility rules; some limited exceptions apply. Players may hold more than one non-FIFA nationality.

No.	Pos.	Nation	Player
7	FW	HUN	Tibor Tisza (from Debrecen)
8	MF	HUN	Péter Takács (to Mezőkövesd)
27	DF	SVK	Michal Hanek
35	MF	BRA	Thiago Bonfim (loan to Tököl)

- List of Hungarian football transfers summer 2013
- List of Hungarian football transfers winter 2013–14

== Statistics ==
=== Appearances and goals ===
Last updated on 1 June 2014.

No.	Pos	Nat	Player	Total		OTP Bank Liga		Hungarian Cup		League Cup	
No.	Pos	Nat	Player	Apps	Goals	Apps	Goals	Apps	Goals	Apps	Goals
1	GK	(Serbia) SRB	Nenad Rajić	25	-40	17	-31	4	-4	4	-5
3	DF	(Bosnia and Herzegovina) BIH	Senad Husić	31	1	16	1	5	0	10	0
4	DF	(Hungary) HUN	Tamás Kádár	37	1	24	1	8	0	5	0
5	DF	(Brazil) BRA	William Alves	22	4	8	1	4	1	10	2
6	DF	(Hungary) HUN	Gergő Gohér	28	2	19	2	3	0	6	0
7	FW	(Serbia) SRB	Miroslav Grumić	22	2	12	1	4	1	6	0
9	FW	(Hungary) HUN	Patrik Bacsa	45	17	29	8	8	2	8	7
10	MF	(Cameroon) CMR	Mohamadolu Abdouraman	22	3	14	2	3	1	5	0
11	MF	(Serbia) SRB	Zoran Kostić	38	6	23	4	7	1	8	1
14	DF	(Hungary) HUN	András Debreceni	25	3	10	0	6	1	9	2
15	DF	(Hungary) HUN	András Vági	22	0	15	0	1	0	6	0
17	MF	(Hungary) HUN	Tamás Egerszegi	11	0	3	0	2	0	6	0
18	MF	(Hungary) HUN	András Gosztonyi	42	4	25	3	6	0	11	1
20	MF	(Hungary) HUN	Márk Nikházi	34	5	22	4	5	0	7	1
21	MF	(Hungary) HUN	Martin Csirszki	4	0	1	0	0	0	3	0
22	GK	(Croatia) CRO	Ivan Radoš	23	-17	14	-7	3	-3	6	-7
23	DF	(Hungary) HUN	Viktor Vadász	36	0	26	0	5	0	5	0
25	MF	(Hungary) HUN	Ákos Elek	35	4	25	3	8	1	2	0
31	MF	(Hungary) HUN	Dávid Barczi	37	2	26	2	4	0	7	0
81	MF	(Hungary) HUN	Balázs Szabó	6	0	1	0	0	0	5	0
88	FW	(Ecuador) ECU	Augusto Batioja	39	4	19	2	8	0	12	2
89	MF	(Serbia) SRB	Lazar Marjanović	14	1	7	0	3	1	4	0
94	DF	(Hungary) HUN	Gábor Eperjesi	23	0	12	0	4	0	7	0
99	FW	(Hungary) HUN	Márkó Futács	35	15	22	9	5	3	8	3
Youth players:
19	FW	(Hungary) HUN	Marcell Hornyák	1	0	0	0	0	0	1	0
48	DF	(Hungary) HUN	Milán Nemes	1	0	0	0	0	0	1	0
50	MF	(Hungary) HUN	Gabriel Boros	4	1	0	0	1	0	3	1
53	DF	(Hungary) HUN	Alex Balogh	1	0	0	0	0	0	1	0
55	GK	(Hungary) HUN	Vince Gelei	4	-7	0	0	1	-3	3	-4
Out to loan:
35	MF	(Brazil) BRA	Thiago Bonfim	2	0	0	0	0	0	2	0
Players no longer at the club:
7	FW	(Hungary) HUN	Tibor Tisza	17	8	13	1	1	2	3	5
8	MF	(Hungary) HUN	Péter Takács	14	0	7	0	2	0	5	0
17	FW	(Hungary) HUN	Gergely Rudolf	3	0	3	0	0	0	0	0
27	DF	(Slovakia) SVK	Michal Hanek	5	0	2	0	1	0	2	0
88	FW	(France) FRA	L´Imam Seydi	3	0	3	0	0	0	0	0

=== Top scorers ===
Includes all competitive matches. The list is sorted by shirt number when total goals are equal.

Last updated on 1 June 2014

Position	Nation	Number	Name	OTP Bank Liga	Hungarian Cup	League Cup	Total
1	(Hungary)	9	Patrik Bacsa	8	2	7	17
2	(Hungary)	99	Márkó Futács	9	3	3	15
3	(Hungary)	7	Tibor Tisza	1	2	5	8
4	(Serbia)	11	Zoran Kostić	4	1	1	6
5	(Hungary)	20	Márk Nikházi	4	0	1	5
6	(Hungary)	25	Ákos Elek	3	1	0	4
7	(Hungary)	18	András Gosztonyi	3	0	1	4
8	(Ecuador)	88	Augusto Batioja	2	0	2	4
9	(Brazil)	5	William Alves	1	1	2	4
10	(Cameroon)	10	Mohamadolu Abdouraman	2	1	0	3
11	(Hungary)	14	András Debreceni	0	1	2	3
12	(Hungary)	31	Dávid Barczi	2	0	0	2
13	(Hungary)	6	Gergő Gohér	2	0	0	2
14	(Serbia)	7	Miroslav Grumić	1	1	0	2
15	(Bosnia and Herzegovina)	3	Senad Husić	1	0	0	1
16	(Hungary)	4	Tamás Kádár	1	0	0	1
17	(Serbia)	89	Lazar Marjanović	0	1	0	1
18	(Hungary)	50	Gabriel Boros	0	0	1	1
/	/	/	Own Goals	1	1	1	3
			TOTALS	45	15	25	85

=== Disciplinary record ===
Includes all competitive matches. Players with 1 card or more included only.

Last updated on 1 June 2014

Position	Nation	Number	Name	OTP Bank Liga		Hungarian Cup		League Cup		Total (Hu Total)	
Position	Nation	Number	Name	Booked	Sent off (straight red)	Booked	Sent off (straight red)	Booked	Sent off (straight red)	Booked	Sent off (straight red)
GK	(Serbia)	1	Nenad Rajić	2	0	0	0	0	0	2 (2)	0 (0)
DF	(Bosnia and Herzegovina)	3	Senad Husić	1	0	0	0	2	0	3 (1)	0 (0)
DF	(Hungary)	4	Tamás Kádár	4	3	0	1	0	0	4 (4)	4 (3)
DF	(Brazil)	5	William Alves	0	1	0	0	2	0	2 (0)	1 (1)
DF	(Hungary)	6	Gergő Gohér	3	0	0	0	0	0	3 (3)	0 (0)
FW	(Hungary)	7	Tibor Tisza	1	0	0	0	1	0	2 (1)	0 (0)
FW	(Serbia)	7	Miroslav Grumić	2	0	0	0	0	0	2 (2)	0 (0)
MF	(Hungary)	8	Péter Takács	5	0	1	0	0	0	6 (5)	0 (0)
FW	(Hungary)	9	Patrik Bacsa	1	0	1	0	1	0	3 (1)	0 (0)
MF	(Cameroon)	10	Mohamadolu Abdouraman	3	1	2	0	1	0	6 (3)	1 (1)
MF	(Serbia)	11	Zoran Kostić	8	1	1	0	0	0	9 (8)	1 (1)
DF	(Hungary)	14	András Debreceni	2	0	0	0	1	0	3 (2)	0 (0)
DF	(Hungary)	15	András Vági	3	1	1	0	3	0	7 (3)	1 (1)
FW	(Hungary)	17	Gergely Rudolf	1	0	0	0	0	0	1 (1)	0 (0)
MF	(Hungary)	17	Tamás Egerszegi	0	0	0	0	1	0	1 (0)	0 (0)
MF	(Hungary)	18	András Gosztonyi	3	0	3	0	1	0	7 (3)	0 (0)
MF	(Hungary)	20	Márk Nikházi	4	0	1	0	2	0	7 (4)	0 (0)
MF	(Hungary)	21	Martin Csirszki	0	0	0	0	1	0	1 (0)	0 (0)
GK	(Croatia)	22	Ivan Radoš	1	0	0	0	2	0	3 (1)	0 (0)
DF	(Hungary)	23	Viktor Vadász	4	0	1	0	0	0	5 (4)	0 (0)
MF	(Hungary)	25	Ákos Elek	5	0	2	0	0	0	7 (5)	0 (0)
MF	(Hungary)	31	Dávid Barczi	5	0	0	0	1	0	6 (5)	0 (0)
FW	(Ecuador)	88	Augusto Batioja	3	0	2	0	2	0	7 (3)	0 (0)
MF	(Serbia)	89	Lazar Marjanović	0	0	1	0	0	0	1 (0)	0 (0)
DF	(Hungary)	94	Gábor Eperjesi	3	0	2	0	0	1	5 (3)	1 (0)
FW	(Hungary)	99	Márkó Futács	6	1	2	0	3	0	11 (6)	1 (1)
			TOTALS	71	8	20	1	24	1	115 (71)	10 (8)

=== Overall ===
Games played	51 (30 OTP Bank Liga, 8 Hungarian Cup and 13 Hungarian League Cup)
Games won	23 (12 OTP Bank Liga, 4 Hungarian Cup and 7 Hungarian League Cup)
Games drawn	17 (11 OTP Bank Liga, 3 Hungarian Cup and 3 Hungarian League Cup)
Games lost	11 (7 OTP Bank Liga, 1 Hungarian Cup and 3 Hungarian League Cup)
Goals scored	86
Goals conceded	64
Goal difference	+22
Yellow cards	115
Red cards	10
Worst discipline	(Hungary) Márkó Futács (11 (yellow card) , 1 (red card) )
Best result	7–1 (H) v Kisvárda – Ligakupa – 20-11-2013
Worst result	0–4 (A) v Debrecen – OTP Bank Liga – 11-08-2013
Worst result	0–4 (H) v Paks – OTP Bank Liga – 26-04-2014
Most appearances	(Hungary) Patrik Bacsa (45 appearances)
Top scorer	(Hungary) Patrik Bacsa (17 goals)
Points	86/153 (56.21%)

Last updated: 1 June 2014

== Nemzeti Bajnokság I ==
=== Matches ===
27 July 2013 1	Győr	1–1	Diósgyőr	Győr, Győr-Moson-Sopron County
21:00 CEST	Wolfe 78'	(Report)	Husić 53'	Stadium: ETO Park; Attendance: 2,500; Referee: (Hungary) József Erdős

3 August 2013 2	Diósgyőr	2–2	MTK	Miskolc, Borsod-Abaúj-Zemplén County
16:30 CEST	Alves 40'; Tisza 54'	(Report)	Pölöskei 14'; Bese 67'	Stadium: DVTK Stadion; Attendance: 4,000; Referee: (Hungary) Tamás Bognár

11 August 2013 3	Debrecen	4–0	Diósgyőr	Debrecen, Hajdú-Bihar County
16:30 CEST	Bódi 33'; Volaš 38'; Szakály 61'; Dombi 90+2'	(Report)		Stadium: Stadion Oláh Gábor Út; Attendance: 6,500; Referee: (Hungary) Zsolt Szabó

17 August 2013 4	Diósgyőr	1–1	Kecskemét	Miskolc, Borsod-Abaúj-Zemplén County
16:30 CEST	Barczi 15'	(Report)	Rajczi 73'	Stadium: DVTK Stadion; Attendance: 3,351; Referee: (Hungary) Sándor Andó-Szabó

24 August 2013 5	Pápa	0–1	Diósgyőr	Pápa, Veszprém County
16:30 CEST		(Report)	Nagy 88' (o.g.)	Stadium: Stadion Várkerti; Attendance: 2,000; Referee: (Hungary) József Erdős

31 August 2013 6	Diósgyőr	2–0	Újpest	Miskolc, Borsod-Abaúj-Zemplén County
21:00 CEST	Kostić 36'; Kádár 51'	(Report)		Stadium: DVTK Stadion; Attendance: 4,569; Referee: (Hungary) Ádám Németh

14 September 2013 7	Puskás	0–2	Diósgyőr	Székesfehérvár, Fejér County
16:00 CEST		(Report)	Futács 58'; Bacsa 88'	Stadium: Sóstói Stadion; Attendance: 300; Referee: (Hungary) Péter Solymosi

21 September 2013 8	Diósgyőr	2–0	Honvéd	Miskolc, Borsod-Abaúj-Zemplén County
14:00 CEST	Nikházi 3'; Bacsa 71'	(Report)		Stadium: DVTK Stadion; Attendance: 4,852; Referee: (Hungary) Viktor Kassai

28 September 2013 9	Kaposvár	0–2	Diósgyőr	Kaposvár, Somogy County
16:00 CEST		(Report)	Nikházi 3', 70'	Stadium: Stadion Kaposvár Rákóczi; Attendance: 1,400; Referee: (Hungary) Zsolt Szabó

6 October 2013 10	Diósgyőr	5–0	Mezőkövesd	Miskolc, Borsod-Abaúj-Zemplén County
16:00 CEST	Futács 34', 54' (pen.); Bacsa 66', 84'; Batioja 80'	(Report)		Stadium: DVTK Stadion; Attendance: 5,705; Referee: (Hungary) Tamás Bognár

19 October 2013 11	Paks	0–2	Diósgyőr	Paks, Tolna County
18:00 CEST		(Report)	Elek 34'; Barczi 62'	Stadium: Stadion PSE; Attendance: 2,500; Referee: (Hungary) István Vad

26 October 2013 12	Haladás	2–2	Diósgyőr	Szombathely, Vas County
20:00 CEST	Nagy 24'; Németh 61'	(Report)	Abdouraman 11', 89'	Stadium: Rohonci úti Stadion; Attendance: 3,525; Referee: (Hungary) Ádám Farkas

2 November 2013 13	Diósgyőr	1–4	Ferencváros	Miskolc, Borsod-Abaúj-Zemplén County
14:00 CET	Futács 1'	(Report)	Jenner 14'; Böde 46', 86'; Gyömbér 52'	Stadium: DVTK Stadion; Attendance: 9,271; Referee: (Hungary) Sándor Andó-Szabó

9 November 2013 14	Pécs	1–1	Diósgyőr	Pécs, Baranya County
18:00 CET	Grumić 3'	(Report)	Bacsa 58'	Stadium: Stadion PMFC; Attendance: 1,200; Referee: (Hungary) Péter Solymosi

24 November 2013 15	Diósgyőr	2–2	Videoton	Miskolc, Borsod-Abaúj-Zemplén County
16:30 CET	Bacsa 5'; Gohér 73'	(Report)	Kleinheisler 1'; Kovács 29'	Stadium: DVTK Stadion; Attendance: 5,039; Referee: (Hungary) István Vad

1 December 2013 16	Diósgyőr	1–2	Győr	Miskolc, Borsod-Abaúj-Zemplén County
16:30 CET	Kostić 43'	(Report)	Střeštík 55'; Pátkai 67'	Stadium: DVTK Stadion; Attendance: 5,080; Referee: (Hungary) Sándor Andó-Szabó

7 December 2013 17	MTK	2–2	Diósgyőr	Budapest, Pest County
18:00 CET	Kanta 50'; Horváth 53'	(Report)	Bacsa 55'; Nikházi 81'	Stadium: Hidegkuti Nándor Stadium; Attendance: 600; Referee: (Hungary) Tamás Bognár

2 March 2014 18	Diósgyőr	1–1	Debrecen	Miskolc, Borsod-Abaúj-Zemplén County
18:30 CET	Futács 17'	(Report)	Volaš 15'	Stadium: DVTK Stadion; Attendance: 6,067; Referee: (Hungary) István Vad

8 March 2014 19	Kecskemét	1–1	Diósgyőr	Kecskemét, Bács-Kiskun County
14:00 CET	Varga 63'	(Report)	Futács 16' (pen.)	Stadium: Széktói Stadion; Attendance: 2,382; Referee: (Hungary) Ádám Németh

14 March 2014 20	Diósgyőr	2–1	Pápa	Miskolc, Borsod-Abaúj-Zemplén County
19:00 CET	Gosztonyi 75', 80' (pen.)	(Report)	Griffiths 40'	Stadium: DVTK Stadion; Attendance: 4,597; Referee: (Hungary) Ádám Farkas

23 March 2014 21	Újpest	2–0	Diósgyőr	Budapest, Pest County
16:30 CET	Tshibuabua 8'; Kabát 19' (pen.)	(Report)		Stadium: Szusza Ferenc Stadium; Attendance: 4,813; Referee: (Hungary) István Vad

29 March 2014 22	Diósgyőr	2–3	Puskás	Miskolc, Borsod-Abaúj-Zemplén County
14:00 CET	Gosztonyi 17' (pen.); Gohér 80' (pen.)	(Report)	Tischler 66', 88'; Lencse 77' (pen.)	Stadium: DVTK Stadion; Attendance: 4,477; Referee: (Hungary) Ádám Németh

5 April 2014 23	Honvéd	1–2	Diósgyőr	Budapest, Pest County
14:00 CEST	Živanović 9'	(Report)	Futács 21'; Kostić 60'	Stadium: Bozsik Stadion; Attendance: 2,000; Referee: (Hungary) József Erdős

12 April 2014 24	Diósgyőr	1–0	Kaposvár	Miskolc, Borsod-Abaúj-Zemplén County
18:00 CEST	Elek 57'	(Report)		Stadium: DVTK Stadion; Attendance: 3,905; Referee: (Hungary) Dániel Becséri

20 April 2014 25	Mezőkövesd	0–1	Diósgyőr	Mezőkövesd, Borsod-Abaúj-Zemplén County
18:30 CEST		(Report)	Bacsa 90'	Stadium: Mezőkövesdi Városi Stadion; Attendance: 4,000; Referee: (Hungary) István Vad

26 April 2014 26	Diósgyőr	0–4	Paks	Miskolc, Borsod-Abaúj-Zemplén County
20:00 CEST		(Report)	Szabó 30'; Bartha 34'; Simon 38' (pen.); Könyves 56'	Stadium: DVTK Stadion; Attendance: 3,935; Referee: (Hungary) Péter Solymosi

4 May 2014 27	Diósgyőr	1–1	Haladás	Miskolc, Borsod-Abaúj-Zemplén County
16:30 CEST	Kostić 17'	(Report)	Dvorschák 32'	Stadium: DVTK Stadion; Attendance: 2,869; Referee: (Hungary) József Erdős

10 May 2014 28	Ferencváros	2–1	Diósgyőr	Budapest, Pest County
14:00 CEST	Bönig 29'; Böde 85'	(Report)	Elek 47'	Stadium: Ferenc Puskás Stadium; Attendance: 11,171; Referee: (Hungary) Viktor Kassai

17 May 2014 29	Diósgyőr	3–0	Pécs	Miskolc, Borsod-Abaúj-Zemplén County
16:00 CEST	Futács 50'; Grumić 77'; Batioja 79'	(Report)		Stadium: DVTK Stadion; Attendance: 3,797; Referee: (Hungary) Dániel Becséri

1 June 2014 30	Videoton	1–1	Diósgyőr	Székesfehérvár, Fejér County
16:30 CEST	Nikolić 76'	(Report)	Futács 68'	Stadium: Sóstói Stadion; Attendance: 3,461; Referee: (Hungary) Tamás Bognár

=== Classification ===
Pos	Team	Pld	W	D	L	GF	GA	GD	Pts	Qualification or relegation
3	Ferencváros	30	17	6	7	47	33	+14	57	Qualification for Europa League first qualifying round
4	Videoton	30	15	8	7	52	31	+21	53	
5	Diósgyőr	30	12	11	7	45	38	+7	47	Qualification for Europa League first qualifying round (Note: Diósgyőr qualified for the Europa League first qualifying round as the 2013–14 Magyar Kupa runners-up since the winners, Újpest, failed to receive the UEFA license to participate in European competitions.)
6	Haladás	30	12	10	8	37	31	+6	46	
7	Pécs	30	12	9	9	41	38	+3	45	

Source: mlsz.hu (in Hungarian)
Rules for classification: 1st points; 2nd overall wins; 3rd goal difference; 4th head-to-head points; 5th head-to-head goal difference; 6th head-to-head away goals scored; 7th fair-play points; 8th drawing of lots

=== Results summary ===
Overall								Home						Away					
Pld	W	D	L	GF	GA	GD	Pts	W	D	L	GF	GA	GD	W	D	L	GF	GA	GD
30	12	11	7	45	38	+7	47	6	5	4	26	21	+5	6	6	3	19	17	+2

Last updated: 1 June 2014.
Source: NB1

=== Results by round ===
Round	1	2	3	4	5	6	7	8	9	10	11	12	13	14	15	16	17	18	19	20	21	22	23	24	25	26	27	28	29	30
Ground	A	H	A	H	A	H	A	H	A	H	A	A	H	A	H	H	A	H	A	H	A	H	A	H	A	H	H	A	H	A
Result	D	D	L	D	W	W	W	W	W	W	W	D	L	D	D	L	D	D	D	W	L	L	W	W	W	L	D	L	W	D
Position	7	9	12	13	9	7	5	4	4	2	2	2	3	4	3	3	4	4	4	4	5	8	6	6	5	6	6	7	5	5

Updated to match(es) played on 1 June 2014. Source: Matches
A = Away; H = Home; W = Win; D = Draw; L = Loss

== Hungarian Cup ==
30 October 2013 Round of 32	Cigánd	3–4	Diósgyőr	Cigánd, Borsod-Abaúj-Zemplén County
12:30 CET	Tempfli 8'; Sipos 38' (pen.); Baksa 48'	(Report)	Tempfli 9' (o.g.); Tisza 67' (pen.), 81'; Alves 77'	Stadium: Cigándi Sporttelep; Attendance: 1,200; Referee: (Hungary) János Takács

27 November 2013 Round of 16 (1st leg)	Videoton	0–0	Diósgyőr	Székesfehérvár, Fejér County
17:00 CET		(Report)		Stadium: Sóstói Stadion; Attendance: 1,100; Referee: (Hungary) Ádám Farkas

4 December 2013 Round of 16 (2nd leg)	Diósgyőr	1–0 (1–0 agg.)	Videoton	Miskolc, Borsod-Abaúj-Zemplén County
18:00 CET	Futács 16' (pen.)	Report		Stadium: DVTK Stadion; Attendance: 2,200; Referee: (Hungary) Péter Solymosi

11 March 2014 Quarter-final (1st leg)	Pápa	2–2	Diósgyőr	Pápa, Veszprém County
17:00 CET	Csizmadia 40'; Arsić 69'	(Report)	Abdouraman 2'; Marjanović 74'	Stadium: Stadion Várkerti; Attendance: 300; Referee: (Hungary) Dániel Becséri

26 March 2014 Quarter-final (2nd leg)	Diósgyőr	3–0 (5–2 agg.)	Pápa	Miskolc, Borsod-Abaúj-Zemplén County
18:00 CET	Futács 16', 29' (pen.); Kostić 78'	Report		Stadium: DVTK Stadion; Attendance: 1,600; Referee: (Hungary) Zoltán Iványi

15 April 2014 Semi-final (1st leg)	Debrecen	4–2	Diósgyőr	Debrecen, Hajdú-Bihar County
18:00 CEST	Seydi 21'; Volaš 33'; Bódi 41'; Tisza 86'	(Report)	Grumić 36'; Elek 90'	Stadium: Stadion Oláh Gábor Út; Attendance: 2,500; Referee: (Hungary) Sándor Andó-Szabó

7 May 2014 Semi-final (2nd leg)	Diósgyőr	2–0 ((a) 4 – 4 agg.)	Debrecen	Miskolc, Borsod-Abaúj-Zemplén County
18:00 CEST	Debreceni 2'; Bacsa 21'	Report		Stadium: DVTK Stadion; Attendance: 2,500; Referee: (Hungary) Zoltán Iványi

25 May 2014 Final	Újpest	1–1 (a.e.t.) (4–3 p)	Diósgyőr	Budapest, Pest County
19:00 CEST	Litauszki 6'	(Report)	Bacsa 90+1'	Stadium: Ferenc Puskás Stadium; Attendance: 22,000; Referee: (Hungary) Péter Solymosi
	Penalties
	Vasiljević (penalty scored); Litauszki (penalty scored); Tshibuabua (penalty scored); Simon (penalty scored)		Kostić (penalty scored); Bacsa (penalty scored); Alves (penalty missed); Barczi (penalty scored); Husić (penalty missed)

== League Cup ==
=== Group stage ===
4 September 2013 1	Kisvárda	1–1	Diósgyőr	Kisvárda, Szabolcs-Szatmár-Bereg County
16:30 CEST	Lakatos 8' (pen.)	(Report)	Nikházi 52'	Stadium: Stadion Várkerti; Attendance: 500; Referee: (Hungary) Roland Veizer

11 September 2013 2	Diósgyőr	3–1	MTK	Miskolc, Borsod-Abaúj-Zemplén County
19:30 CEST	Bacsa 20', 32'; Debreceni 30'	(Report)	Gera 75' (pen.)	Stadium: DVTK Stadion; Attendance: 1,000; Referee: (Hungary) Gábor Oláh

9 October 2013 3	Vasas	1–0	Diósgyőr	Budapest, Pest County
16:00 CEST	Hohmann 48'	(Report)		Stadium: Stadion Rudolf Illovszky; Attendance: 300; Referee: (Hungary) József Berger

16 October 2013 4	Diósgyőr	4–2	Vasas	Miskolc, Borsod-Abaúj-Zemplén County
17:00 CEST	Tisza 50' (pen.), 70'; Alves 60'; Boros 71'	(Report)	Hohmann 65'; Boka 88'	Stadium: DVTK Stadion; Attendance: 600; Referee: (Hungary) Roland Veizer

13 November 2013 5	MTK	2–0	Diósgyőr	Budapest, Pest County
13:00 CET	Zs. Horváth 45'; P. Horváth 59'	(Report)		Stadium: Hidegkuti Nándor Stadium; Attendance: 100; Referee: (Hungary) Szabolcs Szilasi

20 November 2013 6	Diósgyőr	7–1	Kisvárda	Miskolc, Borsod-Abaúj-Zemplén County
15:00 CET	Tisza 10', 34', 71'; Batioja 27'; Futács 42'; Bacsa 53'; Debreceni 86'	(Report)	Barzó 37'	Stadium: DVTK Stadion; Attendance: 400; Referee: (Hungary) Roland Veizer

==== Classification ====
Pos	Team	Pld	W	D	L	GF	GA	GD	Pts	Qualification
1	Diósgyőr	6	3	1	2	15	8	+7	10	Advance to knockout phase
2	Vasas	6	3	0	3	8	10	−2	9	Advance to knockout phase
3	Kisvárda	6	2	2	2	7	11	−4	8	
4	MTK	6	2	1	3	8	9	−1	7	

Rules for classification: 1) points; 2) goal difference; 3) number of goals scored.

=== Knockout phase ===
26 February 2014 Round of 16 (1st leg)	Mezőkövesd	3–1	Diósgyőr	Mezőkövesd, Borsod-Abaúj-Zemplén County
18:00 CET	Hegedűs 24'; Fótyik 57', 88'	(Report)	Futács 26'	Stadium: Mezőkövesdi Városi Stadion; Attendance: 3,000; Referee: (Hungary) Sándor Andó-Szabó

4 March 2014 Round of 16 (2nd leg)	Diósgyőr	2–0 ((a) 3 – 3 agg.)	Mezőkövesd	Miskolc, Borsod-Abaúj-Zemplén County
17:00 CET	Gosztonyi 11' (pen.); Batioja 51'	(Report)		Stadium: DVTK Stadion; Attendance: 1,300; Referee: (Hungary) Péter Solymosi

18 March 2014 Quarter-final (1st leg)	Diósgyőr	2–2	Szigetszentmiklós	Miskolc, Borsod-Abaúj-Zemplén County
18:00 CET	Sánta 62' (o.g.); Bacsa 85'	(Report)	Takács 23'; Khous 90+1'	Stadium: DVTK Stadion; Attendance: 1,200; Referee: (Hungary) József Erdős

1 April 2014 Quarter-final (2nd leg)	Szigetszentmiklós	0–1 (2–3 agg.)	Diósgyőr	Szigetszentmiklós, Pest County
15:30 CEST		(Report)	Bacsa 23'	Stadium: Stadium Sport Street; Attendance: 500; Referee: (Hungary) Dániel Becséri

23 April 2014 Semi-final (1st leg)	Ferencváros	1–2	Diósgyőr	Budapest, Pest County
18:00 CEST	Péter 27'	(Report)	Alves 48'; Bacsa 65'	Stadium: Ferenc Puskás Stadium; Attendance: 2,000; Referee: (Hungary) Zoltán Iványi

30 April 2014 Semi-final (2nd leg)	Diósgyőr	1–1 (3–2 agg.)	Ferencváros	Miskolc, Borsod-Abaúj-Zemplén County
17:30 CEST	Bacsa 44'	(Report)	Mateos 54' (pen.)	Stadium: DVTK Stadion; Attendance: 2,871; Referee: (Hungary) Ádám Németh

13 May 2014 Final	Diósgyőr	2–1	Videoton	Miskolc, Borsod-Abaúj-Zemplén County
19:00 CEST	Kostić 9'; Futács 12'	(Report)	Juhász 69'	Stadium: DVTK Stadion; Attendance: 6,000; Referee: (Hungary) Sándor Andó-Szabó

== Pre-season ==
29 June 2013 1	Debreceni VSC (Hungary)	2–1	(Hungary) Diósgyőri VTK	Debrecen, Hajdú-Bihar County
CEST	Rezes 5'; Horváth 69'	(Report)	Rudolf 42'	Stadium: Debrecen-Pallag; Attendance: 600; Referee: (Hungary) Roland Veizer

3 July 2013 2	Diósgyőri VTK (Hungary)	0–3	(Romania) CS Gaz Metan Mediaș	Miskolc, Borsod-Abaúj-Zemplén County
CEST		(Report)	Eric 23'; Tahar 42'; Llullaku 44'	Stadium: DVTK Stadion; Attendance: 2,000; Referee: (Hungary) Róbert Nagy

6 July 2013 3	Diósgyőri VTK (Hungary)	1–0	(Hungary) Mezőkövesd-Zsóry SE	Miskolc, Borsod-Abaúj-Zemplén County
CEST	Takács 26'	(Report)		Stadium: DVTK Stadion; Attendance: 3,000; Referee: (Hungary) Mihály Fábián

9 July 2013 4	Diósgyőri VTK (Hungary)	0–0	(Romania) AFC Săgeata Năvodari	Jois, Austria
CEST		(Report)		Referee: (Austria)

12 July 2013 5	Diósgyőri VTK (Hungary)	2–0	(Hungary) Paksi SE	Szombathely, Vas County
CEST	Rudolf pen.' Kostić	(Report)		Stadium: Király Sportcentrum; Attendance: 500; Referee: (Hungary) Csaba Pintér

12 July 2013 6	Szombathelyi Haladás (Hungary)	2–1	(Hungary) Diósgyőri VTK	Szombathely, Vas County
CEST	Andorka; Ugrai	(Report)	Gohér	Stadium: Király Sportcentrum; Attendance: 600; Referee: (Hungary) Tamás Bognár

16 July 2013 7	Diósgyőri VTK (Hungary)	1–1	(Israel) Hapoel Ramat Gan Giv'atayim F.C.	Bük, Vas County
CEST	Rudolf pen.'	(Report)	Dedić	Stadium: Városi Sporttelep; Attendance: 100; Referee: (Hungary) Norbert Kiss

19 July 2013 8	Balmazújvárosi FC (Hungary)	1–3	(Hungary) Diósgyőri VTK	Balmazújváros, Hajdú-Bihar County
CEST	Pintér	(Report)	Seydi	Stadium: Batthyány utcai Sportpálya; Attendance: 500; Referee: (Hungary) Ferenc Karakó
