= 2014 Magyar Kupa final =

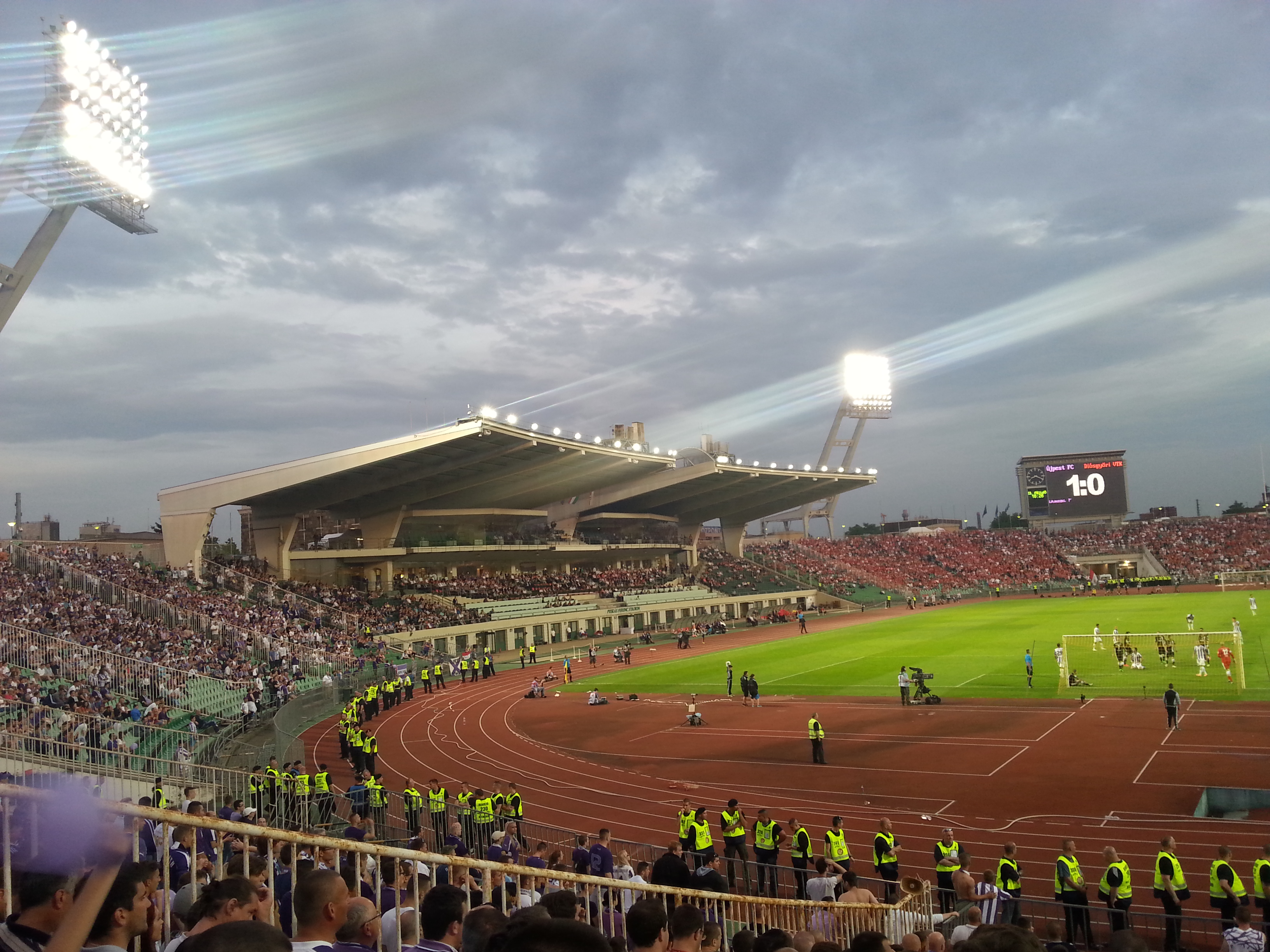
- Puskás Ferenc Stadion hosted the final
- Event: 2013–14 Magyar Kupa
Újpest	Diósgyőr
1	1
- Újpest won 4–3 on penalties
- Date: 25 May 2014
- Venue: Puskás Ferenc Stadion, Budapest
- Referee: Péter Solymosi
- Attendance: 22,000

The Magyar Kupa final was the final match of the 2013–14 Magyar Kupa, played between Újpest and Diósgyőr.

== Teams ==
Team	Previous finals appearances (bold indicates winners)
Újpest	14 (1922, 1923, 1925, 1927, 1933, **1969**, **1970**, **1975**, **1982**, **1983**, **1987**, **1992**, 1998, **2002**)
Diósgyőr	5 (1942, 1965, **1977**, **1980**, 1981)

== Route to the final ==
Újpest			Round	Diósgyőr
Opponent	Result	Legs		Opponent	Result	Legs
Baja	6–0		Fourth Round	Cigánd	4–3
Ferencváros	1–0	0–0 away; 1–0 home	Fifth Round	Videoton	1–0	0–0 away; 1–0 home
Pécs	7–1	3–1 away; 4–0 home	Quarterfinals	Pápa	5–2	2–2 away; 3–0 home
MTK Budapest	3–0	0–0 away; 3–0 home	Semifinals	Debrecen	4–4 (a)	2–4 away; 2–0 home

== Match ==
25 May 2014
19:00 CEST

Újpest	1–1 (a.e.t.)	Diósgyőr
Litauszki 6'	Summary; Report (Hungarian)	Bacsa 90'
Penalties
Vasiljević (penalty scored); Litauszki (penalty scored); Tshibuabua (penalty scored); Simon (penalty scored)	4–3	(penalty scored) Kostić; (penalty scored) Bacsa; (penalty missed) William Alves; (penalty scored) Barczi; (penalty missed) Husić

Puskás Ferenc Stadion, Budapest
Attendance: 22,000
Referee: Péter Solymosi

**Újpest**	**Diósgyőr**

GK	(Hungary) Szabolcs Balajcza
DF	(Spain) Chema Antón (yellow card) 30'
DF	(Hungary) Róbert Litauszki
DF	(Belgium) Pierre-Yves Ngawa
MF	(Belgium) Jonathan Heris
MF	(Serbia) Dušan Vasiljević (yellow card) 16'
MF	(Serbia) Filip Stanisavljević (substituted off) 81'
MF	(Hungary) Balázs Balogh (yellow card) 10'
WI	(Bosnia and Herzegovina) Asmir Suljić (substituted off) 97'
FW	(Hungary) Péter Kabát (yellow card) 24' (substituted off) 69'
WI	(Hungary) Krisztián Simon (yellow card) 74'
Substitutes:
GK	(Serbia) Marko Dmitrović
DF	(Spain) Juanan (substituted on) 81'
DF	(Hungary) János Nagy (substituted on) 97' (yellow card) 110'
DF	(Belgium) Simon Ligot
MF	(Belgium) Nikolas Proesmans
FW	(Democratic Republic of the Congo) Bavon Tshibuabua (substituted on) 69'
FW	(Hungary) Balázs Zamostny
Manager:
(Serbia) Nebojša Vignjević

GK	(Croatia) Ivan Radoš
DF	(Hungary) Viktor Vadász
DF	(Hungary) András Debreceni (substituted off) 19'
DF	(Brazil) William Alves
DF	(Hungary) Tamás Kádár (red card) 95'
DF	(Bosnia and Herzegovina) Senad Husić
MF	(Serbia) Zoran Kostić
MF	(Hungary) Ákos Elek (yellow card) 35' (substituted off) 112'
MF	(Hungary) András Gosztonyi (yellow card) 13' (substituted off) 66'
FW	(Serbia) Miroslav Grumić
FW	(Hungary) Patrik Bacsa
Substitutes:
GK	(Serbia) Nenad Rajić
DF	(Hungary) András Vági
DF	(Hungary) Gábor Eperjesi
MF	(Hungary) Dávid Barczi (substituted on) 66'
MF	(Hungary) Tamás Egerszegi (substituted on) 112'
MF	(Hungary) Márk Nikházi
FW	(Ecuador) Augusto Batioja (substituted on) 19' (yellow card) 30'
Manager:
(Serbia) Tomislav Sivić
