= 2013–14 Magyar Kupa =

Tournament details
- Country: Hungary
- Teams: 103

Final positions
- Champions: Újpest (9th title)
- Runners-up: Diósgyőr

Tournament statistics
- Top goal scorer(s): (Hungary) Gábor Fekete (Hungary) Zoltán Böőr

The 2013–14 Magyar Kupa (English: Hungarian Cup) was the 74th season of Hungary's annual knock-out cup football competition. It started with the first match of Round 1 on 7 August 2013 and ended with the final held in May 2014 at Stadium Puskás Ferenc, Budapest. Debrecen were the defending champions, having won their sixth cup competition last season. The winner of the competition will qualify for the second qualifying round of the 2014–15 UEFA Europa League.

== First round ==
Matches were played on 7, 10 & 11 August 2013 and involved the teams qualified through the local cup competitions during the previous season, Nemzeti Bajnokság III, Nemzeti Bajnokság II and the Nemzeti Bajnokság I teams.

Team 1	Score	Team 2
7 August 2013
Szolnoki MÁV (II)	0–1	Mezőkövesd-Zsóry (I)
10 August 2013
Balmazújvárosi FC (IV)	0–7	Kemecse (IV)
Nyírgyulaj (IV)	0–5	Békéscsaba (II)
Gyöngyösi AK (IV)	3–3 (2–4p)	Cigánd (III)
Felosőzsolca (IV)	1–0	Jászberényi FC (IV)
Putnok (III)	0–2	Ceglédi (II)
Nagykőrösi Kinizsi Törtel (IV)	2–0	Tállya (IV)
Szeged 2011 (III)	3–2	Kozármisleny (II)
Csanádpalotai (IV)	1–3	Dunaújváros PASE (II)
Lipót SE (IV)	1–4	BKV Előre (III)
Pannonhalma (IV)	0–3	Gödöllői (IV)
Répcelaki (IV)	1–6	Ajka (II)
Szigetszentmiklósi (II)	2–1	Tatabánya (II)
Gyirmót (II)	2–0	Vasas (II)
11 August 2013
Elek (IV)	1–7	Várda (II)
Ebes (III)	0–2	Nyíregyháza Spartacus (II)
Nagyszekeres Unió (IV)	1–2	Balmazújvárosi Sport (II)
Mezőkovácsházi (IV)	2–4	Nyírbátori (III)
Markas (IV)	2–3	Tiszaújváros (III)
Kunhegyes (IV)	2–4	Kazincbarcikai (III)
Szikszó-Tomor-Lak (IV)	1–5	Felsőtárkány (III)
Geresdlak (IV)	3–2	Orosháza (III)
Mórahalom VSE (IV)	0–2	Szekszárd (III)
Kunszállás (IV)	3–0	Pecsvarad Spartacus (IV)
Thermál Spa Siklós (IV)	1–0	Hetányegyházi (IV)
Géderlaki (IV)	0–2	Sárszentmiklósi (IV)
Tolna Városi (IV)	0–7	Bajai (III)
Sárisáp-Tatabányai Alapítvány (IV)	0–2	Balassagyarmat (IV)
Berkenye (IV)	0–6	Mosonmagyaróvári TE (III)
Voyage (IV)	4–1	Martonvásári (IV)
Csornai (IV)	1–4	Rákosmenti KSK (IV)
Bábolnai (IV)	1–3	Erzsébeti Spartacus MTK LE (III)
Dunaharaszti MTK (III)	2–4	Soproni VSE (II)
Pilisi (IV)	2–0	Öttevényi (IV)
Biatorbágyi SE (IV)	3–0	Ménfőcsanaki SE (IV)
Letenye (IV)	0–2	Balatonfüredi (III)
Balatonkenese Globe Dental (IV)	0–6	Hévíz (IV)
Pápateszéri (IV)	0–1	Uraiújfalu (IV)
Nádasd (IV)	0–4	Veszprém (III)
Balatonlelle (IV)	1–7	Andráshida (IV)
Péti (IV)	0–5	Zalaszentgróti (IV)
Szombathelyi Haladás II (III)	0–13	Csákvári (III)
Nagyberki (IV)	0–5	Zalaegerszegi (II)

== Second round ==
Matches were played on 28 August 2013 and involved teams qualified from the first round. The rest of the teams received a bye for the third round.

Team 1	Score	Team 2
27 August 2013
Cigánd (III)	3–2	Felsőtárkány (III)
28 August 2013
Nyíregyháza Spartacus (II)	2–0	Ceglédi (II)
Kunszállás (IV)	0–5	Mezőkövesd-Zsóry (I)
Balassagyarmati VSE (IV)	1–1 (3–5p)	Kemecse (IV)
Gödöllői (IV)	0–2	Szeged 2011 (III)
Dunaújváros PASE (II)	2–0	Szigetszentmiklósi (II)
Biatorbágyi SE (IV)	3–2	Veszprém (III)
Andráshida (IV)	2–3	Puskás FC (I)
Thermál Spa Siklós (IV)	1–5	Soproni Vasutas Sportegylet (II)
Uraiújfalu (IV)	2–4 (a.e.t.)	Geresdlak (IV)
Békéscsaba (II)	2–0	Balmazújvárosi Sport (II)
Zalaegerszegi (II)	1–2	Ajka (II)

== Round of 64 ==
Matches were played on 24 and 25 September 2013.

Team 1	Score	Team 2
24 September 2013
Balatonfüredi (III)	0–2	Ajka (II)
Rákosmenti KSK (IV)	0–3	Békéscsaba (II)
Kazincbarcikai (III)	3–4	Mezőkövesd-Zsóry (I)
25 September 2013
Hévíz (IV)	1–7	Dunaújváros PASE (II)
Sárszentmiklósi (IV)	0–1	Csákvári (III)
Zalaszentgróti (IV)	0–2	Gyirmót (II)
Viadukt Biatorbágyi SE (IV)	2–1	Mosonmagyaróvári TE (III)
Szekszárd (III)	1–0 (a.e.t.)	BKV Előre (III)
Geresdlak (IV)	1–3	Bajai (III)
Tiszaújváros (III)	0–1 (a.e.t.)	Szeged 2011 (III)
Nyírbátori (III)	0–2	Nyíregyháza Spartacus (II)
Felosőzsolca (IV)	2–2 (2–4p)	Cigánd (III)
Voyage (IV)	2–3	Erzsébeti Spartacus MTK LE (III)
Pilisi (IV)	1–2	Kemecse (IV)
Nagykőrösi Kinizsi Törtel (IV)	0–3	Várda (II)
Soproni Vasutas Sportegylet (II)	2–3 (a.e.t.)	Puskás FC (I)

== Round of 32 ==
Matches were played on 22, 29 and 30 October 2013.

22 October 2013	Puskás (I)	0–0 (a.e.t.) (3–4 p)	Kecskemét (I)	Felcsúti Sporkomplexum, Felcsút
13:00				Attendance: 80; Referee: Gábor Oláh
	Penalties
	Nikolić (penalty scored); Haraszti (penalty missed); Szekeres (penalty scored); Czvitkovics (penalty scored); Tischler (penalty missed)		Pekár (penalty scored); Gyagya (penalty scored); Balázs (penalty scored); Vukasović (penalty scored); Savić (penalty missed)

29 October 2013	Várda (II)	3–4	Lombard Pápa (I)	Stadion Várkerti, Kisvárda
12:30	40'; 61'; 69'		21'; 58'; 71'; 76'

29 October 2013	Szekszárd (III)	0–10	Ferencváros (I)
12:30			Böde 10', 70', 78'; Gyömbér 16'; Józsi 36', 48'; Somalia 61'; Bönig 72'; Valpoort 81'; Busai 90+1'

29 October 2013	Ajka (II)	0–6	Kaposvár (I)	Stadium Városi, Ajka
12:30			Waltner 4', 41', 43'; Balázs 35'; Thian 55'; Jammeh 65'

29 October 2013	Szeged 2011 (III)	0–2	MTK Budapest (I)	Szegedi VSE Stadion, Szeged
12:30			Eppel 15'; Varga 74'

30 October 2013	Biatorbágyi SE (IV)	0–2	BFC Siófok (II)
12:30			Bogáti 38'; Pal 48'

30 October 2013	Csákvár (III)	0–3	Haladás (I)
12:30			Ugrai 22', 27'; Andorka 51'

30 October 2013	Cigánd (III)	3–4	Diósgyőr (I)
12:30	Tempfli 8'; Sipos 38' (pen.); Baksa 48'		Tempfli 9' (o.g.); Tisza 68', 82'; Alves 77'

30 October 2013	Baja (III)	0–6	Újpest (I)	Stadium Városi, Baja
12:30			Simon 1'; Sanković 25'; Lázár 41', 55', 61', 72'

30 October 2013	Kemecse (IV)	1–3	Budapest Honvéd (I)
12:30	Fiumei 62'		Vernes 6'; Csábi 41'; Holender 89'

30 October 2013	Erzsébeti Spartacus MTK LE (III)	1–2	Debrecen (I)
12:30	Lorinczy 21'		Szakály 63'; Volaš 88'

30 October 2013	Dunaújváros PASE (II)	2–0	Paks (I)
12:30	Böőr 10'; Burucz 67'

30 October 2013	Egri (II)	1–1 (a.e.t.) (3–4 p)	Nyíregyháza Spartacus (II)	Szentmarjay Tibor Városi Stadion, Eger
12:30	Milic 40'		Reznek 26'

30 October 2013	Gyirmót (II)	0–3 (a.e.t.)	Győri ETO (I)	Ménfői úti stadion, Győr
17:00			Đorđević 28'; Dinjar 68'; Andrić 90'

30 October 2013	Pécsi MFC (I)	2–1	Mezőkövesd-Zsóry (I)	Stadion PMFC, Pécs
18:00	Koller 18'; Szatmári 51'		Harsányi 53'

30 October 2013	Békéscsaba (II)	0–1 (a.e.t.)	Videoton (I)	Stadion Kórház utcai, Békéscsaba
18:00			Zé Luís 117'

== Round of 16 ==
=== First leg ===
26 November 2013	Dunaújváros (II)	1–1	Debrecen (I)	Stadion Eszperantó Út, Dunaújváros
13:30	Godslove 9'		Volaš 59'

26 November 2013	Kecskemét (I)	0–3	MTK Budapest (I)	Széktói Stadion, Kecskemét
17:00			Vass 48'; Z. Horváth 63'; Kanta 90+3'

26 November 2013	Budapest Honvéd (I)	1–1	Pécs (I)	Bozsik Stadion, Budapest
18:00	Daud 50'		Mohl 59'

27 November 2013	Siófok (II)	1–2	Lombard-Pápa (I)	Révész Street Stadium, Siófok
13:00	Pal 68'		Orosz 24'; Griffiths 46'

27 November 2013	Nyíregyháza Spartacus (II)	0–1	Szombathelyi Haladás (I)	Városi Stadion, Nyíregyháza
17:00			Halmosi 11'

27 November 2013	Videoton (I)	0–0	Diósgyőri VTK (I)	Sóstói Stadion, Székesfehérvár
17:00

27 November 2013	Kaposvári Rákóczi (I)	1–2	Győr (I)	Stadion Kaposvár Rákóczi, Kaposvár
17:00	Olah 70' (pen.)		Střeštík 59'; Janvari 64' (o.g.)

27 November 2013	Ferencváros (I)	0–0	Újpest (I)	Ferenc Puskás Stadium, Budapest
18:00

=== Second leg ===
3 December 2013	Debreceni (I)	2–0 (3–1 agg.)	Dunaújváros (II)	Stadion Oláh Gábor Út, Debrecen
17:00	Máté 24'; Volaš 67'

3 December 2013	MTK Budapest (I)	1–0 (4–0 agg.)	Kecskeméti (I)	Hidegkuti Nándor Stadium, Budapest
17:30	Kanta 62'

4 December 2013	Lombard-Pápa (I)	1–1 (3–2 agg.)	Siófok (II)	Stadion Várkerti, Pápa
16:00	Eszlátyi 86'		Pal 47'

4 December 2013	Szombathelyi Haladás (I)	0–2 (1–2 agg.)	Nyíregyháza Spartacus (II)	Rohonci Street Stadium, Szombathely
17:30			Sándor 27'; Törtei 75'

4 December 2013	Diósgyőri VTK (I)	1–0 (1–0 agg.)	Videoton (I)	DVTK Stadion, Miskolc
18:00	Futács 15' (pen.)

4 December 2013	Győri (I)	2–1 (4–2 agg.)	Kaposvári Rákóczi (I)	ETO Park, Győr
18:00	Rudolf 15'; Střeštík 90+1'		Pavlović 41'

4 December 2013	Pécsi (I)	1–0 (2–1 agg.)	Budapest Honvéd (I)	Stadion PMFC, Pécs
18:00	Grumić 88'

4 December 2013	Újpest (I)	1–0 (1–0 agg.)	Ferencváros (I)	Ferenc Szusza Stadium, Újpest
18:00	Vasiljević 72'

== Quarter-finals ==
=== First leg ===
11 March 2014	Lombard-Pápa (I)	2–2	Diósgyőr (I)	Stadion Várkerti, Pápa
17:00	Csizmadia 40'; Arsić 69'	Report	Abdouraman 2'; Marjanović 74'

12 March 2014	Nyíregyháza (II)	1–3	Debrecen (I)	Városi Stadion, Nyíregyháza
17:30	Huszák 63'		Tisza 50', 79'; Bódi 54' (pen.)

12 March 2014	MTK Budapest (I)	2–0	Győr (I)	Hidegkuti Nándor Stadium, Budapest
17:30	Torghelle 36'; Kanta 67'

12 March 2014	Pécs (I)	1–3	Újpest (I)	Stadion PMFC, Pécs
18:00	Pölöskey 84'		Vasiljević 64', 73' (pen.), 80'

=== Second leg ===
25 March 2014	Debrecen (I)	6–1 (9–1 agg.)	Nyíregyháza (II)	Stadion Oláh Gábor Út, Debrecen
17:00	Seydi 6'; Sidibe 38' (pen.); Ferenczi 45'; Króner 53'; Kulcsár 65', 78'		Króner 29' (o.g.)

26 March 2014	Diósgyőr (I)	3–0 (5–2 agg.)	Lombard-Pápa (I)	DVTK Stadion, Miskolc
18:00	Futács 16', 29' (pen.); Kostić 78'

26 March 2014	Győr (I)	3–3 (3–5 agg.)	MTK Budapest (I)	ETO Park, Győr
18:00	Pátkai 21'; Varga 24'; Andrić 85'		Kanta 45', 87'; Eppel 47'

26 March 2014	Újpest (I)	4–0 (7–1 agg.)	Pécs (I)	Ferenc Szusza Stadium, Újpest
18:00	Balogh 29'; Zamostny 33', 48'; Suljić 52'

== Semi-finals ==
=== First leg ===
15 April 2014	Debrecen (I)	4–2	Diósgyőr (I)	Stadion Oláh Gábor Út, Debrecen
18:00	Seydi 21'; Volaš 32'; Bódi 41'; Tisza 86'		Grumić 36'; Elek 90'

16 April 2014	MTK Budapest (I)	0–0	Újpest (I)	Hidegkuti Nándor Stadium, Budapest
18:00

=== Second leg ===
6 May 2014	Újpest (I)	3–0 (3–0 agg.)	MTK Budapest (I)	Ferenc Szusza Stadium, Újpest
18:00	Juanan 57'; Balogh 79'; Kabát 84'

7 May 2014	Diósgyőr (I)	2–0 (4(a)–4 agg.)	Debrecen (I)	DVTK Stadion, Miskolc
18:00	Kostić 3'; Bacsa 21'

== Final ==
25 May 2014
19:00 CEST

Újpest (I)	1–1	Diósgyőr (I)
Litauszki 6'	Summary; Report (Hungarian)	Bacsa 90'
Penalties
Vasiljević (penalty scored); Litauszki (penalty scored); Tshibuabua (penalty scored); Simon (penalty scored)	4–3	(penalty scored) Kostić; (penalty scored) Bacsa; (penalty missed) William Alves; (penalty scored) Barczi; (penalty missed) Husić

Ferenc Puskás Stadium, Budapest
Attendance: 22,000
Referee: Péter Solymosi

== See also ==
- 2013–14 Nemzeti Bajnokság I
- 2013–14 Nemzeti Bajnokság II
- 2013–14 Nemzeti Bajnokság III
- 2013–14 Ligakupa
