= Brahima =

Brahima is a given name. Notable people with the name include:

- Brahima Cissé (born 1976), Burkinabé footballer
- Brahima Diarra (born 2003), French footballer
- Brahima Doukansy (born 1999), French footballer
- Brahima Guindo (born 1977), Malian judoka
- Brahima Keita (born 1985), Ivorian footballer
- Brahima Bruno Koné (born 1995), Ivorian footballer
- Brahima Korbeogo (born 1975), Burkinabé footballer
- Brahima Ouattara (born 2002), Ivorian footballer
- Brahima Touré (born 1989), Ivorian footballer
- Brahima Traoré (born 1974), Burkinabé footballer

== See also ==
- Issa Traoré de Brahima (born 1962), Burkinabé filmmaker
- Sa Brahima Traore (born 1982), Burkinabé footballer
