= William Alves =

William Alves may refer to:

- William Alves Boys (1868–1938), Canadian politician and barrister
- William Alves (footballer, born 1986), Brazilian football centre-back
- William Alves (footballer, born 1987), Brazilian football centre-back
- William Alves (footballer, born 1991), Brazilian football forward
- Will Alves (born 2005), English footballer
