= Nenad Rajić =

Serbian footballer

Personal information
- Full name: Nenad Rajić
- Date of birth: 28 December 1982 (age 43)
- Place of birth: Novi Sad, SFR Yugoslavia
- Height: 1.93 m (6 ft 4 in)
- Position: Goalkeeper

Senior career*
Years	Team	Apps	(Gls)
2005–2006	Budućnost Banatski Dvor	0	(0)
2006–2007	Spartak Subotica		
2007	Zorya Luhansk	0	(0)
2008–2010	Srem	70	(1)
2010–2012	Alki Larnaca	15	(0)
2012–2013	Mladost Bački Jarak		
2013	Leotar	11	(0)
2013–2014	Diósgyőr	17	(0)
2015–2016	Moravac Mrštane	0	(0)

Managerial career
- 2018-2019: FK Mladost Bački Jarak
- 2019-2020: 1.FC Südring Aschaffenburg
- 2021-2022: FK Vojvodina Perlez
- 2022: OFK Sirig
- 2023: FK Vojvodina Bačko Gradište
- 2023-2024: FK Mladost Bački Petrovac
- 2024-2025: FK 1. Maj Ruma
- 2025: FK Slavija Novi Sad
- 2026: FK Cement Beočin
- 2026-: FK Sloga Maradik
- * Club domestic league appearances and goals

Nenad Rajić (born 28 December 1982) is a Serbian retired footballer and football coach.

Nenad has UEFA A coaching licence.

== Honours ==
Diósgyőr

- Hungarian League Cup (1): 2013–14
