= Lazar Marjanović =

Serbian footballer (born 1989)

Personal information
- Date of birth: 8 September 1989 (age 37)
- Place of birth: Niš, SFR Yugoslavia
- Height: 1.89 m (6 ft 2 in)
- Position: Midfielder

Youth career
- 2007–2009: Srem

Senior career*
Years	Team	Apps	(Gls)
2009–2010	Srem	4	(0)
2010–2011	Leotar	26	(3)
2011–2013	Zrinjski Mostar	46	(10)
2013–2014	Radnički Kragujevac	2	(0)
2014–2015	Diósgyőr	27	(5)
2015–2016	Borac Banja Luka	23	(3)
2016	Dinamo Batumi	9	(1)
2017–2019	Krupa	41	(7)
2019–2020	Proleter Novi Sad	29	(0)
2020–2021	Grafičar Beograd	27	(3)
2021–2023	Mačva Šabac	51	(5)
2023–2024	Radnički Beograd	20	(1)
- * Club domestic league appearances and goals

Lazar Marjanović (Serbian Cyrillic: Лазар Марјановић; born 8 September 1989) is a Serbian professional footballer.

He had a spell with Hungarian side Diósgyőr.

== Honours ==
Diósgyőr

- Hungarian League Cup (1): 2013–14
