= András Gosztonyi =

Hungarian footballer

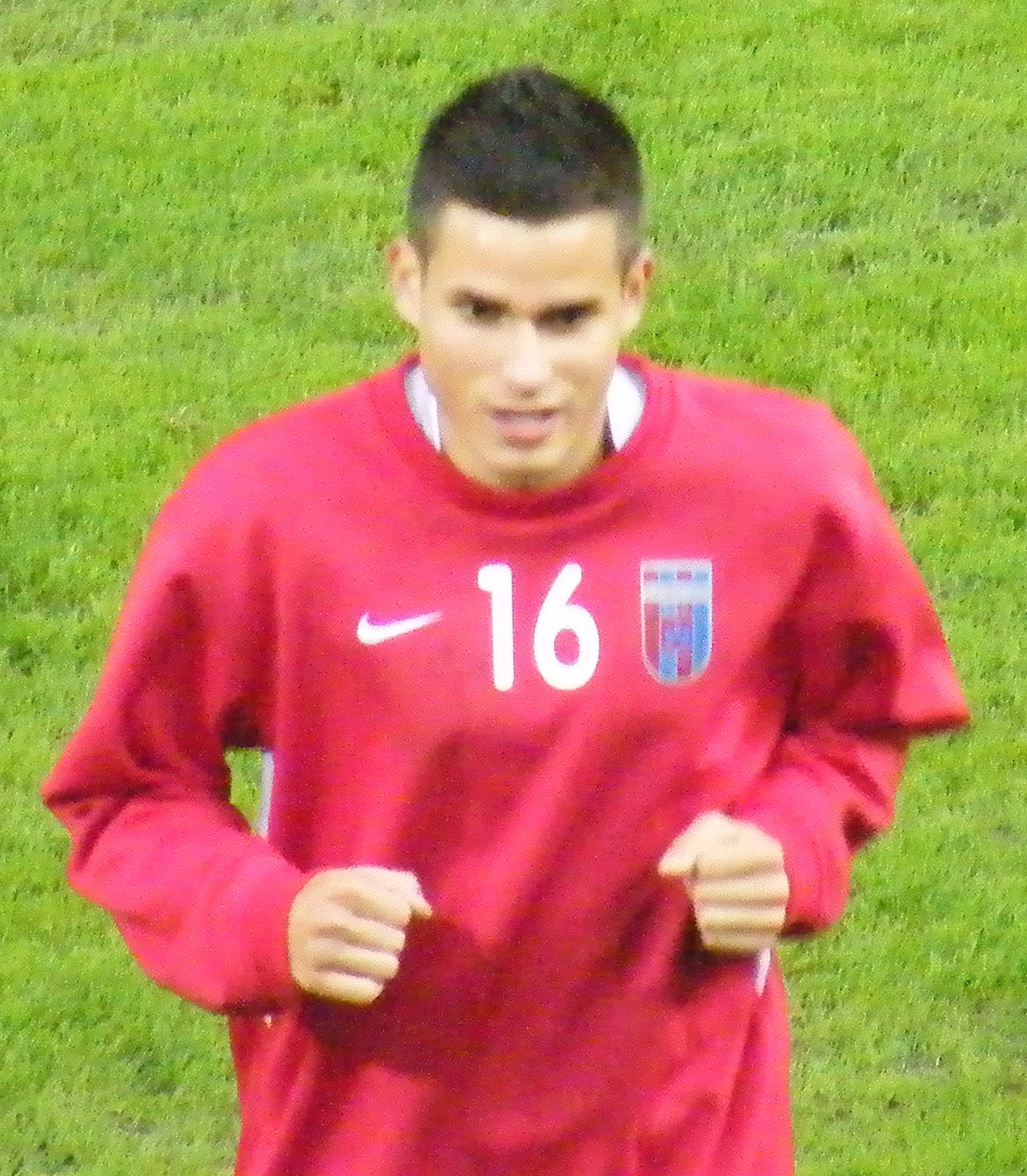

Personal information
- Full name: András Gosztonyi
- Date of birth: 7 November 1990 (age 36)
- Place of birth: Kaposvár, Hungary
- Height: 1.83 m (6 ft 0 in)
- Position: Right midfielder

Team information
- Current team: ASK Goberling
- Number: 7

Youth career
- 1997–2001: Mézga FC
- 2002–2006: Kaposvár
- 2006–2009: MTK

Senior career*
Years	Team	Apps	(Gls)
2009–2010	MTK	24	(5)
2010	→ Bari (loan)	2	(0)
2010–2012	Videoton	40	(4)
2012–2015	Diósgyőr	71	(5)
2015	Haladás	15	(0)
2016	Śląsk Wrocław	8	(0)
2016–2022	Kisvárda	108	(15)
2022–2023	Dunaújváros	16	(2)
2023	Móri SE	25	(1)
2024	Fehérvár II	10	(0)
2024–	ASK Goberling	13	(2)

International career
2008	Hungary U19	10	(1)
2009–2010	Hungary U20		
2009–2013	Hungary U21		
Medal record
Representing Hungary
Men's football
FIFA U-20 World Cup
Third place	2009 Egypt
- * Club domestic league appearances and goals as of 6 November 2024

András Gosztonyi (born 7 November 1990) is a Hungarian professional footballer who plays as a right midfielder for Austrian club ASK Goberling.

== Club career ==
At the age of 18, Gosztonyi spent a week on trial at Newcastle United.

On 1 February 2010, Gosztonyi signed for Italian club Bari until the conclusion of the 2009–10 campaign. He transferred to the Italian club from MTK Budapest. In the spring season Gosztonyi made two substitute appearances for Bari (against Siena and Juventus).

== International career ==
Gosztonyi's original position is striker, but he played midfielder at the Hungary U19 national team.

== Career statistics ==
As of matches played 10 June 2020

Appearances and goals by club, season and competition
Club	Season	League			National cup		League cup		Europe		Total	
Club	Season	Division	Apps	Goals	Apps	Goals	Apps	Goals	Apps	Goals	Apps	Goals
MTK Budapest	2007–08	Nemzeti Bajnokság I	0	0	0	0	4	2	—		4	2
MTK Budapest	2008–09	Nemzeti Bajnokság I	11	0	4	1	6	1	—		21	2
MTK Budapest	2009–10	Nemzeti Bajnokság I	13	5	5	1	2	1	—		20	7
MTK Budapest	Total		24	5	9	2	12	4	0	0	45	11
Bari	2009–10	Serie A	2	0	0	0	—		—		2	0
Videoton	2010–11	Nemzeti Bajnokság I	23	3	7	1	2	0	2	0	34	4
Videoton	2011–12	Nemzeti Bajnokság I	17	2	2	0	3	0	2	0	24	2
Videoton	Total		40	5	9	1	5	0	4	0	58	6
Diósgyőr	2012–13	Nemzeti Bajnokság I	21	0	3	1	5	0	—		29	1
Diósgyőr	2013–14	Nemzeti Bajnokság I	25	3	6	0	11	1	—		42	4
Diósgyőr	2014–15	Nemzeti Bajnokság I	25	2	2	1	4	0	6	1	37	4
Diósgyőr	Total		71	5	11	2	20	1	6	1	108	9
Szombathely	2015–16	Nemzeti Bajnokság I	15	0	5	0	—		—		20	0
Śląsk Wrocław	2015–16	Ekstraklasa	7	0	0	0	—		—		7	0
Śląsk Wrocław	2016–17	Ekstraklasa	1	0	0	0	—		—		1	0
Śląsk Wrocław	Total		8	0	0	0	0	0	0	0	8	0
Kisvárda	2016–17	Nemzeti Bajnokság II	30	10	0	0	—		—		30	10
Kisvárda	2017–18	Nemzeti Bajnokság II	19	0	3	1	—		—		22	1
Kisvárda	2018–19	Nemzeti Bajnokság I	29	1	3	2	—		—		32	3
Kisvárda	2019–20	Nemzeti Bajnokság I	23	4	3	0	—		—		26	4
Kisvárda	Total		101	15	9	3	0	0	0	0	110	18
Career total			261	30	43	8	37	5	10	1	351	44

== Honours ==
Videoton

- Nemzeti Bajnokság I: 2010–11
- Ligakupa: 2011–12
- Szuperkupa: 2011

Diósgyőr

- Ligakupa: 2013–14

Hungary U20

- FIFA U-20 World Cup third place: 2009
