= András Debreceni =

Hungarian footballer

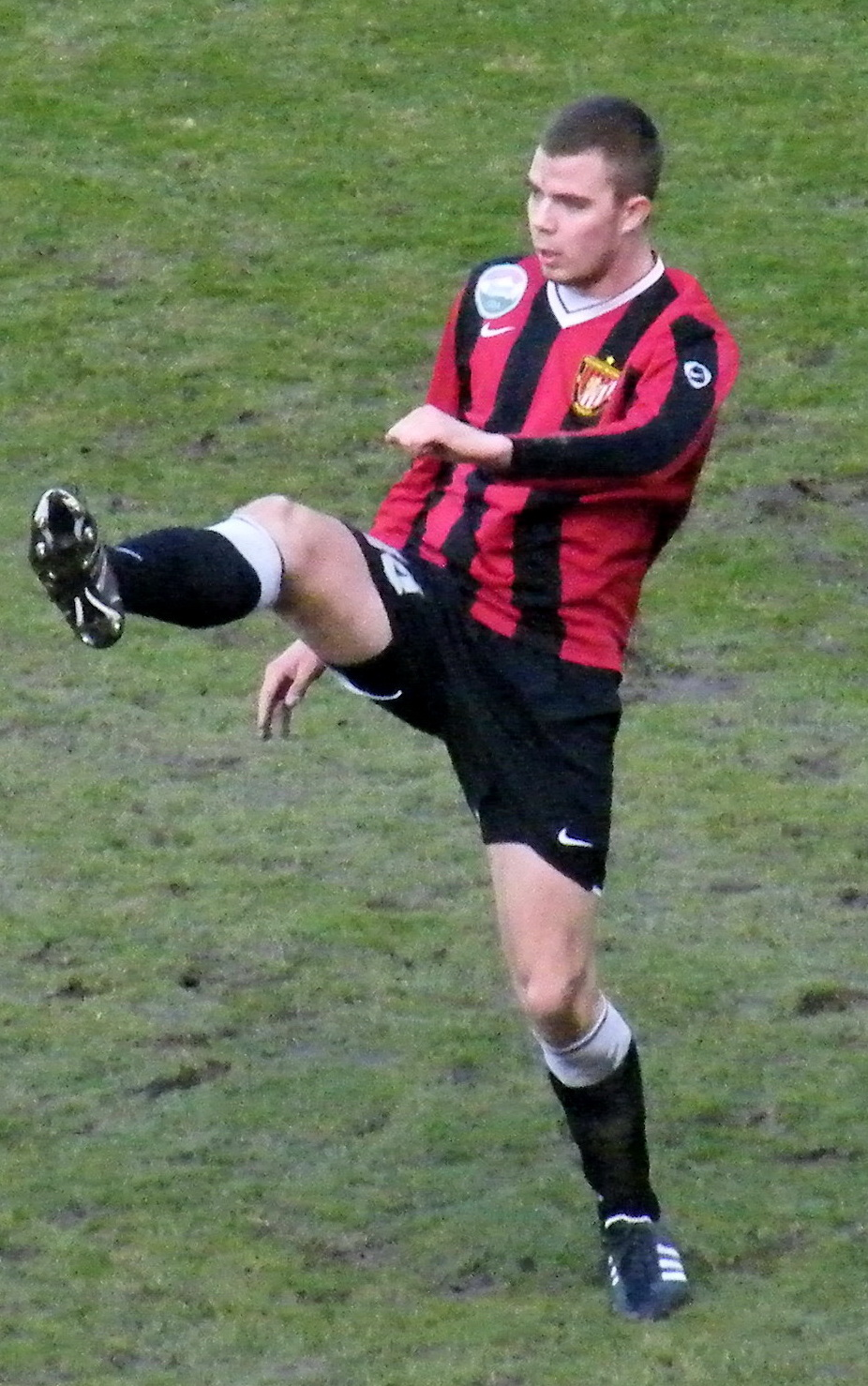

Personal information
- Full name: András Debreceni
- Date of birth: 21 April 1989 (age 37)
- Place of birth: Nagykanizsa, Hungary
- Height: 1.89 m (6 ft 2 in)
- Positions: Centre back; defensive midfielder

Senior career*
Years	Team	Apps	(Gls)
2005–2013	Honvéd	143	(2)
2007–2008	→ Kecskemét (loan)	13	(1)
2013–2014	Diósgyőr	13	(0)
2014–2017	Vasas	57	(5)
2017–2018	ETO FC Győr	43	(2)
2019–2023	Mosonmagyaróvár	106	(31)

International career^{‡}
2005–2006	Hungary U-17	9	(0)
2007–2008	Hungary U-19	7	(0)
2009	Hungary U-20	6	(1)
2009–2011	Hungary U-21	7	(0)
2012	Hungary	1	(0)
- * Club domestic league appearances and goals as of 30 May 2023 ‡ National team caps and goals as of 27 August 2013

András Debreceni (born 21 April 1989) is a Hungarian football defender.

Debreceni made his debut for the senior side of his country on 1 June 2012 in the 2–1 win over the Czech Republic in a friendly match.

== Honours ==
=== Hungary U-20 ===
- FIFA U-20 World Cup:
  - Third place: 2009

=== Budapest Honvéd FC ===
- Hungarian Cup:
  - Winner: 2006–07, 2008–09
- Hungarian Super Cup:
  - Runners-up: 2007, 2009

=== Kecskeméti TE ===
- Hungarian National Championship II:
  - Winner: 2007–08

=== Diósgyőri VTK ===
- Hungarian League Cup (1): 2013–14
