= Kemecse SE =

Hungarian football club

- Full name: Kemecse Sportegyesület
- Founded: 1923
- Dissolved: 2025
- Ground: Szent István út
Home colours

Kemecse Sportegyesület is a defunct professional football club based in Kemecse, Szabolcs–Szatmár–Bereg County, Hungary.

== History ==
Kemecse SE won the Tisza group of the 2010–11 Nemzeti Bajnokság III season. However, the club did not gain promotion to the second division.

In 2021, Kemecse signed former Diósgyőri VTK manager, Tamás Feczkó. He was on the bench in a 2020–21 Megyei Bajnokság I match against Csenger FC.

On 5 August 2025, Kemecse withdrew from the Megyei Bajnokság I due to financial difficulties.

== Name changes ==
- Kemecsei Futball Club: 1923 - ?
- Kemecsei MÁV Barátság: ? - 1947
- Kemecsei MaDISz TE: 1947 - 1948
- Kemecsei MTE: 1948 - 1948
- Kemecsei EPOSz SE: 1948 - 1950
- Kemecsei Vörös Csillag SE: 1950 - 1951
- Kemecsei Lokomotív SK: 1951 - 1954
- Kemecsei Traktor: 1954 - ?
- Kemecsei Hunyadi: ? - ?
- Kemecsei MEDOSZ SE: ? - ?
- Sportegyesület Kemecse: ? -

== Honours ==
=== League ===
- Nemzeti Bajnokság III:
  - Winners (1): 2009–10

== Seasons ==
The highest league that Kemecse SE have ever played was the third division.

Season	Tier	Club's name	Position	Pts
1946–47	4	Kemecsei MÁV Barátság	1 / 6	18
1947–48	4	Kemecsei MaDISz TE	8 / 11	8
1948–49	4	Kemecsei EPOSz SE	9 / 14	23
1949–50	4	Kemecsei EPOSz SE	15 / 16	17
1950	4	Kemecsei Vörös Csillag SE	5 / 12	13
1951	4	Kemecse	0 / 9	
1952	4	Kemecsei Lokomotív	1 / 9	
1953	3	Kemecsei Lokomotív	12 / 14	15
1954	3	Kemecsei Traktor	9 / 14	21
1955	4	Kemecsei Traktor	11 / 14	22
1956	4	Kemecsei Traktor	12 / 14	19
1957	4	Kemecse	3 / 10	24
1957–58	5	Kemecsei Hunyadi	6 / 12	24
1958–59	5	Kemecse	8 / 12	14
1959–60	5	Kemecse	3 / 14	28
1960–61	5	Kemecse	8 / 14	28
1961–62	5	Kemecse	2 / 12	26
1962–63	5	Kemecse	5 / 14	31
1963	6	Kemecse	6 / 12	5
1964	6	Kemecse	6 / 16	33
1965	6	Kemecsei TSZ	9 / 16	27
1966	6	Kemecse	10 / 14	21
1967	6	Kemecse	14 / 14	12
1968	7	Kemecse	2 / 14	42
1969	7	Kemecse	1 / 14	45
1970	7	Kemecse	2 / 14	18
1970–71	7	Kemecsei MEDOSZ	4 / 14	31
1971–72	6	Kemecsei MEDOSZ	12 / 16	17
1972–73	6	Kemecsei MEDOSZ	14 / 16	12
1973–74	6	Kemecsei MEDOSZ	4 / 16	36
1974–75	5	Kemecsei MEDOSZ	11 / 16	25
1975–76	5	Kemecsei MEDOSZ	14 / 16	18
1976–77	5	Kemecsei MEDOSZ	5 / 16	34
1977–78	5	Kemecsei MEDOSZ	12 / 16	26
1978–79	4	Kemecsei MEDOSZ	8 / 18	30
1979–80	4	Kemecsei MEDOSZ	8 / 16	28
1980–81	4	Kemecsei MEDOSZ SE	8 / 16	34
1981–82	4	Kemecsei MEDOSZ SE	17 / 18	17
1982–83	5	Kemecse	8 / 16	30
1983–84	5	Kemecse	1 / 16	49
1984–85	5	Kemecse	1 / 18	54
1985–86	5	Kemecse	7 / 16	29
1986–87	5	Kemecsei Medosz SE	1 / 16	45
1987–88	4	Kemecsei MEDOSZ SE	9 / 16	29
1988–89	4	Kemecsei MEDOSZ SE	15 / 16	18
1989–90	5	Kemecsei MEDOSZ SE	11 / 16	27
1990–91	5	Kemecsei MEDOSZ SE	3 / 16	37
1991–92	5	Kemecsei MEDOSZ SE	4 / 16	34
1992–93	5	Kemecsei MEDOSZ SE	1 / 16	41
1993–94	4	Kemecsei SE	16 / 16	16
1994–95	4	Kemecsei SE	18 / 18	23
1995–96	5	Kemecse	13 / 14	20
1996–97	5	Kemecse SE	10 / 16	39
1997–98	6	Kemecse	2 / 16	73
1998–99	6	Kemecse SE	1 / 16	77
1999–00	5	Kemecse SE	13 / 16	24
2000–01	5	Kemecse SE	16 / 16	25
2001–02	6	Kemecse	11 / 16	25
2002–03	6	Kemecse SE	5 / 14	47
2003–04	6	Kemecse	12 / 16	30
2004–05	6	Kemecse	11 / 16	32
2005–06	5	Kemecse	1 / 16	78
2006–07	4	Kemecse SE	4 / 16	55
2007–08	4	Kemecse SE	1 / 16	76
2008–09	3	Kemecse SE	4 / 16	48
2009–10	3	Kemecse SE	1 / 14	55
2010–11	3	Kemecse SE	4 / 16	58
2011–12	3	SE Kemecse	7 / 16	46
2012–13	4	SE Kemecse	1 / 16	72
2013–14	4	Kemecse SE	4 / 16	57
2014–15	4	SE Kemecse	6 / 16	50
2015–16	4	Kemecse SE	15 / 16	15
2016–17	5	Kemecse SE	3 / 16	65
2017–18	5	Kemecse SE	3 / 16	67
2018–19	5	Kemecse SE	2 / 16	77
2019–20	4	Kemecse SE	12 / 16	20
2020–21	4	Kemecse SE	14 / 16	25
2021–22	4	Kemecse SE	12 / 16	36
2022–23	4	Kemecse SE	6 / 16	42
2023–24	4	Kemecse SE	13 / 16	26
2024–25	4	Kemecse SE	12 / 15	24
