= Miroslav Grumić =

Serbian footballer

Personal information
- Date of birth: 29 June 1984 (age 42)
- Place of birth: Apatin, SFR Yugoslavia
- Height: 1.83 m (6 ft 0 in)
- Position: Forward

Senior career*
Years	Team	Apps	(Gls)
2001–2003	Mladost Apatin	30	(3)
2004	Vojvodina	15	(1)
2005–2006	Mladost Apatin	48	(12)
2006–2008	Vorskla Poltava	45	(6)
2009–2010	Banat Zrenjanin	58	(9)
2011–2012	Kaposvár	25	(8)
2012–2013	Pécs	41	(9)
2014–2016	Diósgyőr	53	(9)
2016	Kisvárda	15	(2)
2017	Kozármisleny	15	(5)
2017–2018	Haladás	27	(1)
2019–2020	Zalaegerszeg	23	(2)
2020–2021	Szeged-Csanád	35	(4)
2021–2023	Szentlőrinc	58	(13)
- * Club domestic league appearances and goals as of 31 May 2023

Miroslav Grumić (Serbian Cyrillic: Мирослав Грумић; born 29 June 1984) is a Serbian professional footballer who plays as a forward for Hungarian club Szentlőrinc.

== Career ==
After starting out at Mladost Apatin, Grumić was transferred to Vojvodina in the 2004 winter transfer window. He returned to his mother club the following year. In the summer of 2006, Grumić moved abroad to Ukrainian side Vorskla Poltava. He returned to Serbia and joined Banat Zrenjanin in the 2009 winter transfer window.

In the 2011 winter transfer window, Grumić moved abroad for the second time and joined Hungarian club Kaposvár. He would go on to play for Pécs, Diósgyőr, Kisvárda, Kozármisleny, Szombathelyi Haladás and Zalaegerszeg.

== Honours ==
Diósgyőr

- Ligakupa: 2013–14

Zalaegerszeg

- Nemzeti Bajnokság II: 2018–19
