= Augusto Batioja =

Ecuadorian footballer (born 1990)

Personal information
- Full name: Augusto Alexi Quintero Batioja
- Date of birth: 4 May 1990 (age 36)
- Place of birth: Guayaquil, Ecuador
- Height: 1.74 m (5 ft 9 in)
- Position: Forward

Team information
- Current team: Viktoria Žižkov
- Number: 18

Youth career
- 2005–2007: Modelo Sport
- 2007: Manta
- 2007–2009: LDU Guayaquil
- 2009: Barcelona

Senior career*
Years	Team	Apps	(Gls)
2007	Manta	4	(0)
2007–2009	LDU Guayaquil	2	(0)
2009–2010	Novi Sad	23	(6)
2010–2011	Inđija	15	(1)
2011–2013	OFK Beograd	65	(9)
2013	Mladost Podgorica	3	(0)
2013–2014	Diósgyőr	19	(2)
2014–2015	Radnički Niš	12	(1)
2015–2017	Jihlava	40	(1)
2018–	Viktoria Žižkov	225	(41)
- * Club domestic league appearances and goals as of 28 May 2026

Augusto Alexi Quintero Batioja (born 4 May 1990) is an Ecuadorian professional footballer who plays as a forward for Czech National Football League club Viktoria Žižkov.

== Early career ==
Born in Guayaquil, he played as junior for several Ecuatorian clubs such as Modelo Sport, Manta, LDU Guayaquil and Barcelona SC. Still young, he debuted in the senior teams of both Manta and LDU Guayaquil.

== Europe ==
In 2008, he passed the trials and joined the youth system of Barcelona SC, before moving abroad in summer 2009 and joining Serbian club FK Novi Sad which was playing in the Serbian First League. In summer 2010 he moved to FK Inđija which had just been promoted to the Serbian SuperLiga. After only six months, he moved to another SuperLiga club, OFK Beograd where he stayed for two and a half seasons.

In summer 2013 he left OFK and joined Montenegrin First League side FK Mladost Podgorica however, as soon as Mladost was eliminated from the European competitions, Batioja was signed by Hungarian side Diósgyőri VTK. He played with Diósgyőr in the Hungarian championship during the 2013–14 season and has won with them the 2014 Hungarian League Cup. After one year in Hungary, he returned to Serbia and signed with SuperLiga side FK Radnički Niš coached by Dragoslav Stepanović. In winter 2015 he moved to Vysočina Jihlava.

== Honours ==
Diósgyőr

- Hungarian League Cup: 2013–14
