= Ivan Radoš =

Croatian footballer

Personal information
- Date of birth: 21 February 1984 (age 42)
- Place of birth: Zagreb, SR Croatia, SFR Yugoslavia
- Height: 1.92 m (6 ft 3 1/2 in)
- Position: Goalkeeper

Youth career
- 1997–2002: Zagreb

Senior career*
Years	Team	Apps	(Gls)
2002–2004	Zagreb	0	(0)
2004–2005	Samobor	30	(0)
2005–2006	Moslavina	0	(0)
2006–2007	Naftaš HAŠK	6	(0)
2007–2009	Croatia Sesvete	34	(0)
2009–2019	Diósgyőr	129	(0)
2012–2013	→ Kapaz (loan)	11	(0)
2019–2021	Vasas	12	(0)
2021	Radnički Kragujevac	5	(0)
- * Club domestic league appearances and goals as of 4 December 2022

Ivan Radoš (born 21 February 1984) is a Croatian retired football player.

== Career ==
On 7 June 2019 it was confirmed, that Radoš had joined Vasas SC.

== Club honours ==
=== Diósgyőri VTK ===
- Hungarian League Cup (1): 2013–14
