= András Vági =

Hungarian association footballer

Personal information
- Full name: András Krisztián Vági
- Date of birth: 25 December 1988 (age 37)
- Place of birth: Budapest, Hungary
- Height: 1.73 m (5 ft 8 in)
- Position: Defender

Team information
- Current team: Soroksár
- Number: 15

Youth career
- 2003–2007: MTK Budapest

Senior career*
Years	Team	Apps	(Gls)
2007–2010	MTK Budapest	15	(1)
2010–2011	Aarau	3	(0)
2012–2014	Diósgyőr	50	(0)
2014–2019	Paks	47	(2)
2016–2017	→ Mezőkövesd (loan)	45	(3)
2019–2021	Diósgyőr	30	(0)
2021	Paks	3	(0)
2021–2022	Mezőkövesd	1	(0)
2022–	Soroksár	13	(0)
- * Club domestic league appearances and goals as of 12 August 2024

András Vági (born 25 December 1988) is a Hungarian football player who plays for Soroksár.

== Career ==
On 6 July 2022, Vági signed with Soroksár.

== Honours ==
Diósgyőr

- Hungarian League Cup (1): 2013–14

== Career statistics ==
Appearances and goals by club, season and competition
Club	Season	League			Cup		League Cup		Europe		Total	
Club	Season	Division	Apps	Goals	Apps	Goals	Apps	Goals	Apps	Goals	Apps	Goals
MTK Budapest	2007–08	Nemzeti Bajnokság I	1	0	0	0	8	0	0	0	9	0
MTK Budapest	2008–09	Nemzeti Bajnokság I	1	0	0	0	6	0	0	0	7	0
MTK Budapest	2009–10	Nemzeti Bajnokság I	13	1	3	0	7	0	—		23	1
MTK Budapest	Total		15	1	3	0	21	0	0	0	39	1
Aarau	2010–11	Swiss Challenge League	3	0	0	0	—		—		3	0
Diósgyőr	2011–12	Nemzeti Bajnokság I	10	0	0	0	2	0	—		12	0
Diósgyőr	2012–13	Nemzeti Bajnokság I	25	0	2	0	4	0	—		31	0
Diósgyőr	2013–14	Nemzeti Bajnokság I	15	0	1	0	6	0	—		22	0
Diósgyőr	2019–20	Nemzeti Bajnokság I	25	0	2	0	—		—		27	0
Diósgyőr	2020–21	Nemzeti Bajnokság I	5	0	0	0	—		—		5	0
Diósgyőr	Total		80	0	5	0	12	0	0	0	97	0
Mezőkövesd	2015–16	Nemzeti Bajnokság II	14	2	0	0	—		—		14	2
Mezőkövesd	2016–17	Nemzeti Bajnokság I	31	1	3	1	—		—		34	2
Mezőkövesd	Total		45	3	3	1	0	0	0	0	48	4
Paks	2014–15	Nemzeti Bajnokság I	13	2	0	0	8	0	—		21	2
Paks	2015–16	Nemzeti Bajnokság I	6	0	3	0	—		—		9	0
Paks	2017–18	Nemzeti Bajnokság I	21	0	1	0	—		—		22	0
Paks	2018–19	Nemzeti Bajnokság I	7	0	3	0	—		—		10	0
Paks	2020–21	Nemzeti Bajnokság I	3	0	1	0	—		—		4	0
Paks	Total		50	2	8	0	8	0	0	0	66	2
Career total			193	6	19	1	41	0	0	0	253	7

Updated to games played as of 15 May 2021.
