= Guillaume Khous =

Footballer (born 1992)

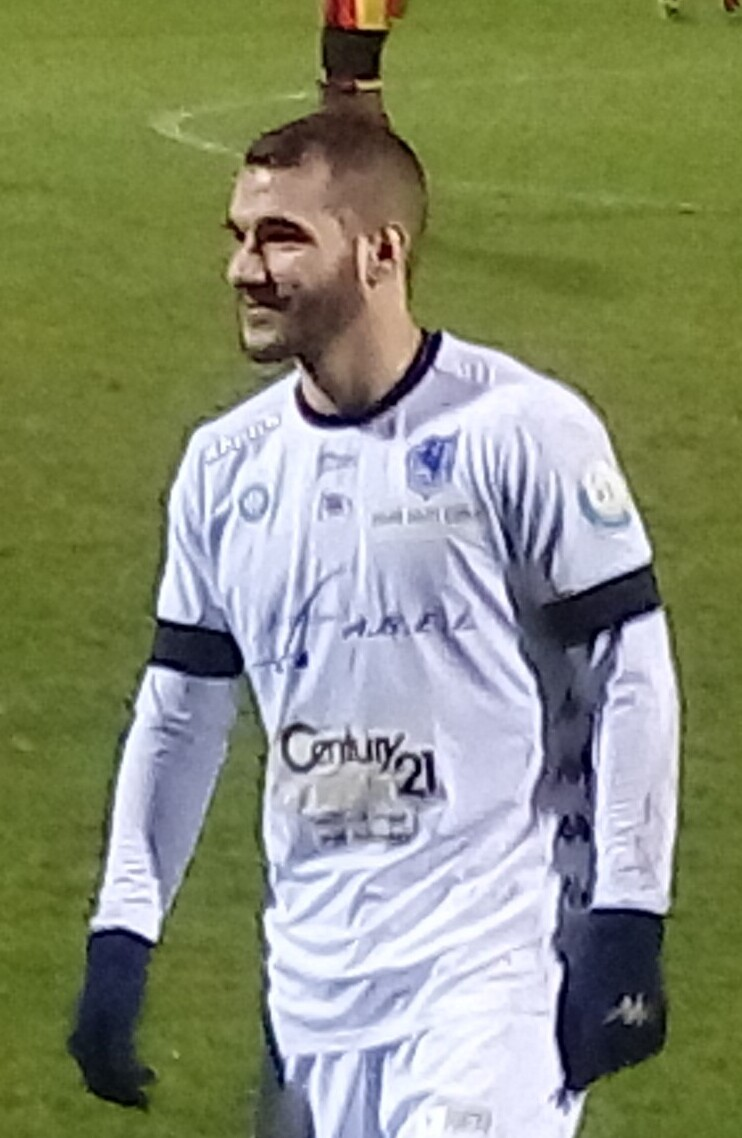
- Khous in 2017

Personal information
- Date of birth: 18 August 1992 (age 34)
- Place of birth: Tremblay-en-France, France
- Height: 1.75 m (5 ft 9 in)
- Positions: Midfielder; attacking midfielder

Team information
- Current team: Orléans
- Number: 10

Youth career
- 2009–2010: Torcy

Senior career*
Years	Team	Apps	(Gls)
2010–2011	Drancy	1	(0)
2011–2012	Lens B	21	(0)
2012–2013	Drancy	10	(0)
2013–2014	Szigetszentmiklós	41	(5)
2014–2015	Sestao	26	(2)
2015–2017	Drancy	52	(13)
2017–2018	Paris FC	0	(0)
2017–2018	→ Drancy (loan)	24	(10)
2018–2019	Drancy	32	(2)
2019–2021	Bourg-en-Bresse	55	(9)
2021–2022	Villefranche	33	(4)
2022–2023	Sedan	33	(3)
2023–2024	Fréjus Saint-Raphaël	23	(1)
2024–	Orléans	63	(7)

International career
2010	Liechtenstein U21	1	(0)
- * Club domestic league appearances and goals as of 6 June 2026

Guillaume Khous (born 18 August 1992) is a professional footballer who plays for as a midfielder for Ligue 3 club Orléans. Born in France, he is a former youth international for Liechtenstein.

== Club career ==
Born in Tremblay-en-France, Khous graduated from Torcy's youth setup, and made his senior debuts with Drancy in the Championnat de France Amateur. On 23 May 2011, he joined RC Lens, being assigned to the reserves in the same division.

Despite appearing regularly, Khous failed to score during his one-year spell at Lens, and subsequently returned to Drancy. In January 2013 he moved abroad, joining Nemzeti Bajnokság II side Szigetszentmiklósi TK, being an ever-present figure during the one and a half seasons at the club.

On 19 August 2014, Khous moved teams and countries again, signing for Spanish Segunda División B side Sestao River.

After a further two-season spell with Drancy, Khous signed for Ligue 2 club Paris FC in June 2017. He made his only first team appearance for the club in a 2017–18 Coupe de la Ligue defeat against Clermont Foot on 22 August 2017. On 14 September 2017, he returned to Drancy on loan for the rest of the season.

On 31 May 2019, after a further season with Drancy, Khous joined Bourg-en-Bresse on a two-year contract.

In June 2021, Khous signed for Villefranche.

On 9 June 2022, he moved to Sedan. He left Sedan for Etoile Fréjus Saint-Raphael in 2023.

On 26 June 2024, Khous signed a two-year contract with Orléans in Championnat National.

== International career ==
Having family origins in Liechtenstein, Khous is eligible to internationally represent this country. In March 2010, he accepted to play for the Liechtenstein U17 national team in a friendly match. After that, the Liechtenstein Football Association offered him to play for the senior national team; however, Khous declined.
