= Bavon Tshibuabua =

Congolese footballer (born 1991)

Personal information
- Date of birth: 17 July 1991 (age 35)
- Place of birth: Antwerp, Belgium
- Height: 1.78 m (5 ft 10 in)
- Position: Forward

Youth career
- 2008–2009: Standard Liège

Senior career*
Years	Team	Apps	(Gls)
2009–2012	Beerschot	37	(1)
2012–2014	Újpest	34	(7)
2013	→ Újpest II	1	(0)
2014–2016	Progresso LS		
2016–2017	Progresso Sambizanga		
2017–2018	Royal Cappellen		
2018–2019	KSK Tongeren		
2019–2020	RFCB Sprimont		
2020–2021	Royal Aywaille		

International career
2010	DR Congo	1	(0)
- * Club domestic league appearances and goals

Bavon Tshibuabua (born 17 July 1991) is a Congolese former professional footballer who played as a forward.

== Career ==
Tshibuabua was born in Antwerp, Belgium. He began his career in summer 2008 in the youth side for Standard Liège and signed on 20 July 2009 a three-year contract with K.F.C. Germinal Beerschot, he played his debut on 22 August 2009 against KV Mechelen. Tshibuabua joined Hungarian side Újpest on 26 June 2012 on a three-year contract.

On 6 September 2019, Tshibuabua joined Belgian club RFCB Sprimont.

== Honours ==
Újpest

- Hungarian Cup: 2013–14
