= Zoran Kostić (footballer) =

Serbian footballer

Personal information
- Date of birth: 14 November 1982 (age 43)
- Place of birth: Čačak, SFR Yugoslavia
- Height: 1.80 m (5 ft 11 in)
- Position: Midfielder

Team information
- Current team: Borac Čačak (manager)

Senior career*
Years	Team	Apps	(Gls)
2001–2002	Polet Ljubić	22	(3)
2002–2006	Borac Čačak	99	(15)
2003–2004	→ Remont Čačak (loan)	1	(0)
2006–2009	Shinnik	22	(0)
2008–2009	→ Ural (loan)	25	(2)
2009–2011	Borac Čačak	52	(4)
2011–2012	Aktobe	25	(3)
2012–2013	Zhetysu	12	(0)
2013–2014	Diósgyőr	23	(4)
2014–2016	Nyíregyháza	27	(0)
2016	Borac Čačak	4	(0)

Managerial career
- 2018: Borac Čačak (assistant)
- 2019–2020: Radnički Niš (assistant)
- 2020: IMT (assistant)
- 2021: Mladost Lučani U19
- 2021–2022: Bajina Bašta
- 2022–2023: Sloboda Užice
- 2023–2024: OFK Vršac
- 2024–2025: FAP
- 2025–: Borac Čačak
- * Club domestic league appearances and goals

Zoran Kostić (Serbian Cyrillic: Зоран Костић; born 14 November 1982) is a Serbian football coach and former player.

== Honours ==
Diósgyőr

- Hungarian League Cup: 2013–14
