= Brahima Touré =

Ivorian footballer

Personal information
- Full name: Brahima Touré
- Date of birth: 9 September 1989 (age 37)
- Place of birth: Ivory Coast
- Height: 1.80 m (5 ft 11 in)
- Position: Midfielder

Team information
- Current team: Al-Hudood

Senior career*
Years	Team	Apps	(Gls)
2007–2008	US Bitam		
2008–2011	CS Sfaxien	12	(1)
2011–2012	Al-Hilal		
2012–2013	ES Zarzis		
2013–2014	FC Lugano	12	(2)
2013	→ FC Locarno (loan)		
2014	→ Kecskeméti TE (loan)		
2014–2015	Stade Gabèsien	20	(1)
2015	DRB Tadjenanet		
2016–2017	US Tataouine		
2018–2019	Baladeyet El Mahalla		
2019–	Al-Hudood		
- * Club domestic league appearances and goals as of February 11, 2019

Brahima Touré (born 9 September 1989), is an Ivorian footballer who currently plays for Al-Hudood in Iraqi Premier League.

== Honours ==
CS Sfaxien

- CAF Confederation Cup:

Winner: 2008
Runner-up: 2010

- North African Cup Winners Cup:

Winner: 2009

- Tunisian Cup:

Winner: 2009
Finalist: 2010
