= Dávid Barczi =

Hungarian footballer

Personal information
- Full name: Dávid Barczi
- Date of birth: 1 February 1989 (age 37)
- Place of birth: Siófok, Hungary
- Height: 1.78 m (5 ft 10 in)
- Position: Midfielder

Team information
- Current team: III. Kerület
- Number: 11

Youth career
- 2002–2007: Újpest

Senior career*
Years	Team	Apps	(Gls)
2007–2013	Újpest II	73	(24)
2009–2013	Újpest	45	(5)
2013	→ Sint-Truidense (loan)	0	(0)
2013–2016	Diósgyőr	76	(6)
2016–2018	Videoton	7	(0)
2016–2017	→ Videoton II	13	(2)
2018–2019	Vasas	14	(1)
2019–2020	Zalaegerszeg	47	(5)
2020–2021	Mezőkövesd	2	(0)
2021–2025	III. Kerület	117	(49)
2025–	Dorog	14	(3)

International career
2010–2011	Hungary U-21	1	(0)
- * Club domestic league appearances and goals as of 14 January 2026

Dávid Barczi (born 1 February 1989, is a Hungarian midfielder who currently plays for III. Kerületi TVE.

== Honours ==
Diósgyőr

- Hungarian League Cup (1): 2013–14

== Career statistics ==
Appearances and goals by club, season and competition
Club	Season	League			Cup		League Cup		Europe		Total	
Club	Season	Division	Apps	Goals	Apps	Goals	Apps	Goals	Apps	Goals	Apps	Goals
Újpest
Újpest	2007–08	Nemzeti Bajnokság III	24	4	0	0	—		—		24	4
Újpest	2008–09	Nemzeti Bajnokság III	27	9	2	0	—		—		29	9
Újpest	2009–10	Nemzeti Bajnokság III	10	9	0	0	—		—		10	9
Újpest	2010–11	Nemzeti Bajnokság II	8	1	0	0	—		—		8	1
Újpest	2012–13	Nemzeti Bajnokság II	4	1	0	0	—		—		4	1
Újpest	Total		73	24	2	0	—		—		75	24
Újpest
Újpest	2008–09	Nemzeti Bajnokság I	0	0	0	0	5	0	—		5	0
Újpest	2009–10	Nemzeti Bajnokság I	12	3	3	0	5	0	0	0	20	3
Újpest	2010–11	Nemzeti Bajnokság I	9	2	2	0	8	1	—		19	3
Újpest	2011–12	Nemzeti Bajnokság I	23	0	8	2	3	3	—		34	5
Újpest	2012–13	Nemzeti Bajnokság I	1	0	0	0	3	0	—		4	0
Újpest	Total		45	5	13	2	24	4	0	0	82	11
Diósgyőr
Diósgyőr	2013–14	Nemzeti Bajnokság I	26	2	4	0	7	0	—		37	2
Diósgyőr	2014–15	Nemzeti Bajnokság I	18	0	3	0	5	1	3	2	29	3
Diósgyőr	2015–16	Nemzeti Bajnokság I	32	4	3	0	—		—		35	4
Diósgyőr	Total		76	6	10	0	12	1	3	2	101	9
Videoton
Videoton	2016–17	Nemzeti Bajnokság I	5	0	2	0	—		5	0	12	0
Videoton	2017–18	Nemzeti Bajnokság I	2	0	1	0	—		1	0	4	0
Videoton	Total		7	0	3	0	—		6	0	16	0
Vasas
Vasas	2017–18	Nemzeti Bajnokság I	13	1	0	0	—		—		13	1
Vasas	2018–19	Nemzeti Bajnokság II	1	0	0	0	—		—		1	0
Vasas	Total		14	1	0	0	—		0	0	14	1
Zalaegerszeg
Zalaegerszeg	2018–19	Nemzeti Bajnokság II	30	3	2	0	—		—		32	3
Zalaegerszeg	2019–20	Nemzeti Bajnokság I	17	2	5	0	—		—		22	2
Zalaegerszeg	Total		47	5	7	0	—		0	0	54	5
Mezőkövesd	2020–21	Nemzeti Bajnokság I	2	0	0	0	—		—		2	0
Career total			264	41	35	2	36	5	9	2	344	50

Updated to games played as of 15 May 2021.
