= Patrik Bacsa =

Hungarian football player

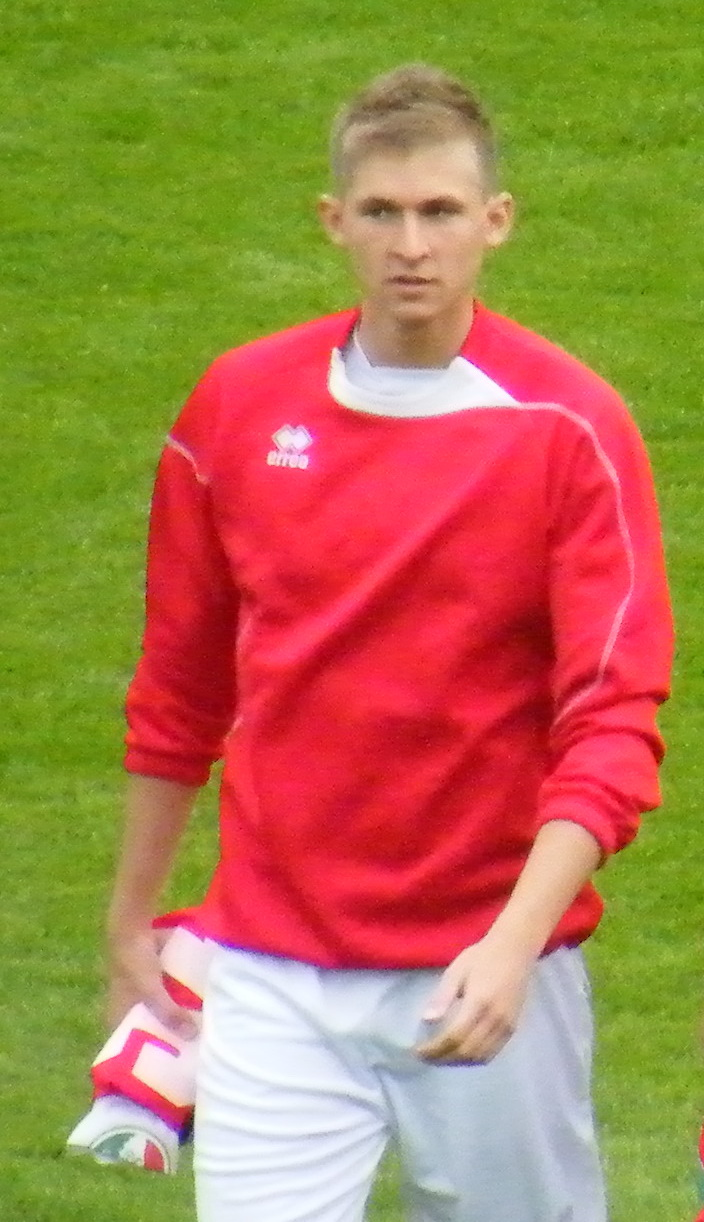

Personal information
- Date of birth: 3 June 1992 (age 34)
- Place of birth: Miskolc, Hungary
- Height: 1.93 m (6 ft 4 in)
- Positions: Forward; striker; winger

Team information
- Current team: BVSC
- Number: 9

Youth career
- 2006–2010: Diósgyőr

Senior career*
Years	Team	Apps	(Gls)
2009–2020	Diósgyőr	207	(28)
2017	→ Kisvárda (loan)	13	(0)
2020–2021	Újpest	36	(2)
2021–2023	Győri ETO	45	(7)
2023	Kazincbarcika	15	(1)
2024–	BVSC	62	(9)

International career^{‡}
2012	Hungary U-20	2	(0)
2013	Hungary U-21	5	(1)
- * Club domestic league appearances and goals as of 31 May 2026 ‡ National team caps and goals as of 5 August 2015

Patrik Bacsa (born 3 June 1992) is a Hungarian football player who plays for BVSC.

== Club career ==
Bacsa moved to Újpest in January 2020.

On 22 July 2021, Bacsa signed a two-year contract with Győri ETO.

On 2 February 2023, he moved to Kazincbarcika.

== Career statistics ==
Appearances and goals by club, season and competition
Club	Season	League			Cup		League Cup		Europe		Total	
Club	Season	Division	Apps	Goals	Apps	Goals	Apps	Goals	Apps	Goals	Apps	Goals
Diósgyőr
Diósgyőr	2009–10	Nemzeti Bajnokság I	4	0	0	0	2	0	0	0	6	0
Diósgyőr	2010–11	Nemzeti Bajnokság II	8	1	0	0	0	0	0	0	8	1
Diósgyőr	2011–12	Nemzeti Bajnokság I	10	2	1	0	3	0	0	0	14	2
Diósgyőr	2012–13	Nemzeti Bajnokság I	27	3	3	1	3	1	0	0	33	5
Diósgyőr	2013–14	Nemzeti Bajnokság I	29	8	8	2	8	7	0	0	45	17
Diósgyőr	2014–15	Nemzeti Bajnokság I	28	6	3	1	5	3	6	2	42	12
Diósgyőr	2015–16	Nemzeti Bajnokság I	28	4	3	1	0	0	0	0	31	5
Diósgyőr	2016–17	Nemzeti Bajnokság I	18	1	3	0	0	0	0	0	21	1
Diósgyőr	2017–18	Nemzeti Bajnokság I	19	1	5	1	0	0	0	0	24	2
Diósgyőr	2018–19	Nemzeti Bajnokság I	27	1	3	0	—		—		30	1
Diósgyőr	2019–20	Nemzeti Bajnokság I	9	1	2	0	—		—		11	1
Diósgyőr	Total		207	28	31	6	21	11	6	2	265	47
Kisvárda	2016–17	Nemzeti Bajnokság I	13	0	0	0	0	0	0	0	13	0
Újpest	2019–20	Nemzeti Bajnokság I	14	2	0	0	—		—		14	2
Career total			234	30	31	6	21	11	6	2	292	49

Updated to games played as of 27 June 2020.

== Honours ==
Diósgyőr

- Hungarian League Cup (1): 2013–14
