= 2013–14 Ligakupa =

Tournament details
- Country: Hungary
- Teams: 32

Final positions
- Champions: Diósgyőr
- Runners-up: Videoton

The 2013–14 Ligakupa was the 7th edition of the Hungarian League Cup, the Ligakupa.

== Group stage ==
=== Group A ===
Pos	Team	Pld	W	D	L	GF	GA	GD	Pts	Qualification	DIÓ	VAS	VÁR	MTK
1	Diósgyőr	6	3	1	2	15	8	+7	10	Advance to knockout phase		4–2	7–1	3–1
2	Vasas	6	3	0	3	8	10	−2	9	Advance to knockout phase	1–0		1–0	2–1
3	Kisvárda	6	2	2	2	7	11	−4	8		1–1	2–1		3–1
4	MTK	6	2	1	3	8	9	−1	7		2–0	3–1	0–0	

Legend: Blue = home team win; Yellow = draw; Red = away team win.
Rules for classification: 1) points; 2) goal difference; 3) number of goals scored.

=== Group B ===
Pos	Team	Pld	W	D	L	GF	GA	GD	Pts	Qualification	DEB	MEZ	NYÍ	BAL
1	Debrecen	6	5	0	1	16	5	+11	15	Advance to knockout phase		2–4	3–0	2–0
2	Mezőkövesd	6	3	1	2	16	11	+5	10	Advance to knockout phase	0–2		2–2	2–1
3	Nyíregyháza	6	1	2	3	5	11	−6	5		0–2	3–1		0–3
4	Balmazújváros	6	1	1	4	6	16	−10	4		1–5	1–7	0–0	

Legend: Blue = home team win; Yellow = draw; Red = away team win.
Rules for classification: 1) points; 2) goal difference; 3) number of goals scored.

=== Group C ===
Pos	Team	Pld	W	D	L	GF	GA	GD	Pts	Qualification	SZL	KEC	UTE	BÉK
1	Szolnok	6	3	1	2	15	10	+5	10	Advance to knockout phase		5–2	2–2	4–0
2	Kecskemét	6	3	1	2	13	14	−1	10	Advance to knockout phase	4–2		2–1	0–2
3	Újpest	6	1	3	2	9	9	0	6		2–0	1–2		2–2
4	Békéscsaba	6	1	3	2	8	12	−4	6		0–2	3–3	1–1	

Legend: Blue = home team win; Yellow = draw; Red = away team win.
Rules for classification: 1) points; 2) goal difference; 3) number of goals scored.

=== Group D ===
Pos	Team	Pld	W	D	L	GF	GA	GD	Pts	Qualification	PUS	SZI	CEG	HON
1	Puskás	6	3	2	1	11	5	+6	11	Advance to knockout phase		4–2	3–0	2–0
2	Szigetszentmiklós	6	3	1	2	9	6	+3	10	Advance to knockout phase	1–0		0–1	2–0
3	Cegléd	6	2	2	2	8	11	−3	8		2–2	1–1		1–0
4	Budapest Honvéd	6	1	1	4	5	11	−6	4		0–0	0–3	5–3	

Legend: Blue = home team win; Yellow = draw; Red = away team win.
Rules for classification: 1) points; 2) goal difference; 3) number of goals scored.

=== Group E ===
Pos	Team	Pld	W	D	L	GF	GA	GD	Pts	Qualification	PAK	VID	KOZ	DUN
1	Paks	6	4	1	1	16	7	+9	13	Advance to knockout phase		3–3	4–2	2–0
2	Videoton	6	3	1	2	15	9	+6	10	Advance to knockout phase	1–4		1–2	3–0
3	Kozármisleny	6	2	1	3	7	13	−6	7		0–3	0–4		2–0
4	Dunaújváros	6	1	1	4	2	11	−9	4		1–0	0–3	1–1	

Legend: Blue = home team win; Yellow = draw; Red = away team win.
Rules for classification: 1) points; 2) goal difference; 3) number of goals scored.

=== Group F ===
Pos	Team	Pld	W	D	L	GF	GA	GD	Pts	Qualification	FTC	GYŐ	SOP	TAT
1	Ferencváros	6	5	0	1	14	8	+6	15	Advance to knockout phase		2–1	2–1	2–0
2	Győr	6	4	1	1	21	5	+16	13	Advance to knockout phase	4–1		1–1	7–0
3	Sopron	6	2	1	3	13	11	+2	7		1–3	1–4		0–0
4	Tatabánya	6	0	0	6	2	26	−24	0		1–4	0–4	1–2	

Legend: Blue = home team win; Yellow = draw; Red = away team win.
Rules for classification: 1) points; 2) goal difference; 3) number of goals scored.

=== Group G ===
Pos	Team	Pld	W	D	L	GF	GA	GD	Pts	Qualification	PÁP	SZO	GYI	AJK
1	Pápa	6	3	3	0	9	5	+4	12	Advance to knockout phase		2–0	2–1	2–2
2	Szombathely	6	3	2	1	14	9	+5	11	Advance to knockout phase	0–0		2–2	7–2
3	Gyirmót	6	2	2	2	13	11	+2	8		2–2	2–3		4–2
4	Ajka	6	0	1	5	7	18	−11	1		0–1	1–2	0–2	

Legend: Blue = home team win; Yellow = draw; Red = away team win.
Rules for classification: 1) points; 2) goal difference; 3) number of goals scored.

=== Group H ===
Pos	Team	Pld	W	D	L	GF	GA	GD	Pts	Qualification	KAP	PÉC	SIÓ	ZTE
1	Kaposvár	6	5	0	1	19	4	+15	15	Advance to knockout phase		2–1	3–0	4–0
2	Pécs	6	3	1	2	12	8	+4	10	Advance to knockout phase	2–0		2–2	3–0
3	Siófok	6	2	1	3	7	15	−8	7		1–7	0–2		3–1
4	Zalaegerszeg	6	1	0	5	5	16	−11	3		0–3	4–2	0–1	

Legend: Blue = home team win; Yellow = draw; Red = away team win.
Rules for classification: 1) points; 2) goal difference; 3) number of goals scored.

== Knockout phase ==
=== Round of 16 ===
==== First leg ====
The games were played on 22, 25 and 26 February.

22 February 2014	Kecskeméti	1–5	Lombard-Pápa	Kecskemét
14:00 CET	Varga (yellow card) 4'; Nagy (yellow card) 35'; Balázs 75'		Kenesei 5' (yellow card) 8' (goal) 39'; Tajthy (yellow card) 6'; Tóth 34', 46'; Király (yellow card) 37'; Présinger (yellow card) 52'; Orosz 77' (yellow card) 88'	Stadium: Széktói Stadion

22 February 2014	Haladás	0–0	Ferencvárosi	Szombathely
15:00 CET	Iszlai (yellow card) 33'; Nagy (yellow card) 45+1'; Hrepka (yellow card) 88'		Bešić (yellow card) 12'; Bönig (yellow card) 24'; Pavlovic (yellow card) 56'; Čukić (yellow card) 71'	Stadium: Rohonci Street Stadium

22 February 2014	Szigetszentmiklósi	0–0	Szolnok	Szigetszentmiklós
15:00 CET				Stadium: Sport utcai stadion

22 February 2014	Pécsi	1–1	Paks	Pécs
17:00 CET	Mohl 21'; Városi (yellow card) 44'; Nagy (yellow card) 84'		Heffler (yellow card) 23'; Horváth 41'	Stadium: Stadion PMFC

25 February 2014	Vasas	2–0	Puskás Akadémia	Budapest
17:00 CET	Berecz 24' (yellow card) 80'; Grúz (yellow card) 66'; Remili 77'		Orbán (yellow card) 20'; Guarú (yellow card) 22'; Farkas (yellow card) 29'; Guarú (yellow card) 49' (yellow-red card); Denkovic (yellow card) 69'; Farkas (yellow card) 74' (yellow-red card)	Stadium: Stadion Rudolf Illovszky

26 February 2014	Videoton	3–0	Kaposvár	Székesfehérvár
15:00 CET	Zé Luís 24'; Nildo 69'; Lupeta 88'		Armand Ella (yellow card) 20'; Földes (yellow card) 79'	Stadium: Sóstói Stadion

26 February 2014	Győr	2–1	Debrecen	Győr
16:00 CET	Lang (yellow card) 46'; Dudás 51'; Mevoungou (yellow card) 61'; Rudolf 84'; Lipták (yellow card) 90+2'		Bódi 47' (yellow card) 70'; Tisza (yellow card) 83'	Stadium: ETO Park

26 February 2014	Mezőkövesd	3–1	Diósgyőr	Mezőkövesd
17:00 CET	Hegedűs 24'; Kostić (yellow card) 38'; Fótyik 57', 88'		Futács 26'; Szalai (yellow card) 60'; Gosztonyi (yellow card) 78'	Stadium: Mezőkövesdi Városi Stadion

==== Second leg ====
4 March 2014	Puskás Akadémia	3–1 (3–3 agg.)	Vasas	Székesfehérvár
14:30 CET	Tischler 42' (red card) 82'; Denkovic 62', 89'		Remili 26'	Stadium: Sóstói Stadion; Attendance: 200; Referee: Gergely Szots

4 March 2014	Kaposvár	1–1 (1–4 agg.)	Videoton	Kaposvár
14:30 CET	Hadaró (yellow card) 14'; Murai 50'; Firtulescu (yellow card) 59'; Dankwah (yellow card) 72'		Zé Luís 82'	Stadium: Stadion Kaposvár Rákóczi; Attendance: 250

4 March 2014	Paks	1–3 (2–4 agg.)	Pécs	Paks
15:00 CET	Lázok 6'		Perić 59' (pen.), 66', 68'	Stadium: Stadion PSE; Attendance: 500; Referee: Jozsef Berger

4 March 2014	Lombard-Pápa	4–0 (9–1 agg.)	Kecskeméti	Pápa
17:00 CET	Csizmadia 11'; Griffiths 39'; Kulcsár 44', 84'; Arsić (yellow card) 78'; Venczel (yellow card) 90'		Touré (yellow card) 33'; Gyagya (yellow card) 86'	Stadium: Stadion Várkerti; Attendance: 200

4 March 2014	Szolnoki	1–1 (1–1 agg.)	Szigetszentmiklósi	Szolnok
17:30 CET	Zsolnai 43' (pen.); Vári (yellow card) 56'; Magos (yellow card) 89'		Khous 61' (yellow card) 90+2'; Vágó (yellow card) 68'; Majoros (yellow card) 76'; Bonifert (yellow card) 85' (yellow card) 86' (yellow-red card)	Stadium: Tiszaligeti Stadion; Attendance: 300

4 March 2014	Debrecen	3–1 (4–3 agg.)	Győr	Debrecen
18:00 CET	Vadnai (yellow card) 21'; Bódi 50'; Bouadla 69'; Kovács 88'		Nicorec (yellow card) 4' (goal) 74' (pen.); Stanišić (yellow card) 24'; Had (yellow card) 31' (yellow card) 43' (yellow-red card); Nagy (yellow card) 65'	Stadium: Stadion Oláh Gábor Út

4 March 2014	DVTK	2–0 (3–3 agg.)	Mezőkövesd	Miskolc
18:00 CET	Gosztonyi 11'; Vági (yellow card) 37'; Egerszegi (yellow card) 45'; Batioja 53'		Dobos (yellow card) 33'; Harsányi (yellow card) 71'; Velicky (yellow card) 90+2'	Stadium: DVTK Stadion; Attendance: 1300

4 March 2014	Ferencváros	2–0 (2–0 agg.)	Haladás	Budapest
19:00 CET	Jenner 76', 90' (yellow card) 87'		Iszlai (yellow card) 16'; Simon (yellow card) 59'; Zsirai (yellow card) 75'; Halmosi (yellow card) 84'	Stadium: Ferenc Puskás Stadium

=== Quarter-finals ===
==== First leg ====
18 March 2014	Debrecen	1–1 (3–0) awarded	Puskás Akadémia	Debrecen
17:00 CET	Tisza 26'; Seydi (yellow card) 70'; Kovács (yellow card) 81'		Bertus (yellow card) 34'; Lencse 50'; Gallardo (yellow card) 60'; Németh (yellow card) 74'; Lorentz (yellow card) 84'	Stadium: Stadion Oláh Gábor Út

18 March 2014	Pécsi	1–1	Videoton	Pécs
17:30 CET	Perić (penalty missed) 34'		Nikolić 61'; Hudák (yellow card) 67'	Stadium: Stadion PMFC

18 March 2014	Diósgyőr	2–2	Szigetszentmiklósi	Miskolc
18:00 CET	William Alves 63' (yellow card) 64'; Futács (yellow card) 70'; Bacsa 85'		Takács 23'; Balogh (yellow card) 29'; Barna (yellow card) 45+1'; Kollega (yellow card) 67'; Khous 90+1'	Stadium: DVTK Stadion

19 March 2014	Ferencváros	4–0	Lombard-Pápa	Budapest
18:00 CET	Ugrai 5', 9' (yellow card) 48'; Čukić (yellow card) 14'; Jenner 62'; Bešić (yellow card) 82'; Holman 84'		Tóth (yellow card) 13'; Kulcsár (yellow card) 36'	Stadium: Ferenc Puskás Stadium

==== Second leg ====
1 April 2014	Puskás Akadémia	3–2 (3–5 agg.)	Debrecen	Székesfehérvár
TBA CEST	B. Tóth 36'; Németh 83'; Oldal 89'		Volaš 5', 6'	Stadium: Sóstói Stadion

1 April 2014	Szigetszentmiklósi	0–1 (2–3 agg.)	Diósgyőr	Szigetszentmiklós
TBA CEST	Pollák (yellow card) 27'; Balogh (yellow card) 83'; Kvekveskiri (yellow card) 90+2'		Bacsa 23'; Vági (yellow card) 40'; Batioja (yellow card) 73'; Nikházi (yellow card) 90+1'	Stadium: Sport utcai stadion Attendance: 500

1 April 2014	Lombard-Pápa	0–2 (0–6 agg.)	Ferencváros	Pápa
TBA CEST	Struhar (yellow card) 18'; Nagy (yellow card) 27'; Kulcsár (yellow card) 36'		Laczkó (yellow card) 7'; Ugrai 23'; Diallo 44'; Hidvégi (yellow card) 81'	Stadium: Stadion Várkerti; Attendance: 500

2 April 2014	Videoton	3–0 (4–1 agg.)	Pécsi	Székesfehérvár
17:30 CEST	Juhász 22'; Candé (yellow card) 51'; Haraszti (yellow card) 66' (goal) 71'; Zé Luís 84'; Brachi (yellow card) 90'		Városi (yellow card) 52'	Stadium: Sóstói Stadion

=== Semi-finals ===
==== First leg ====
22 April 2014	Debrecen	1–5	Videoton	Debrecen
18:00 CEST	Dombi (yellow card) 20'; Verpecz (yellow card) 41'; Volaš (yellow card) 58'; Ludanszky 68'; Morozov (yellow card) 86'		Petrolina 6', 74'; Alvarez 9'; Brachi 42' (pen.) (yellow card) 57'; Oliveira 82'	Stadium: Stadion Oláh Gábor Út

23 April 2014	Ferencváros	1–2	Diósgyőr	Budapest
18:00 CEST	Józsi (yellow card) 16'; Gyuracz (yellow card) 23' (yellow card) 43' (yellow-red card); Mateos (yellow card) 24'; Péter 28'		Barczi (yellow card) 29'; Bacsa (yellow card) 32' (goal) 66'; Debreceni (yellow card) 39'; Futács (yellow card) 42'; Alves 50'	Stadium: Ferenc Puskás Stadium

==== Second leg ====
29 April 2014	Videoton	1–0 (6–1 agg.)	Debrecen	Székesfehérvár
17:30 CEST	Gyurcsó 38'; Candé (yellow card) 57'		Kovács (yellow card) 64'	Stadium: Sóstói Stadion

30 April 2014	Diósgyőr	1–1 (3–2 agg.)	Ferencváros	Miskolc
17:30 CEST	Bacsa 44'; Eperjesi (red card) 52'; Husić (yellow card) 71'; Rados (yellow card) 90+2'		Nagy (yellow card) 6'; Busai (yellow card) 20'; Mateos 53' (pen.) (yellow card) 67'; Holman (yellow card) 64'	Stadium: DVTK Stadion

=== Final ===
13 May 2014
19:00 CEST (UTC+2)

Diósgyőr	2–1	Videoton
Kostić 9'; Futács 12'; Husić (yellow card) 83'; Rados (yellow card) 86'		Nikolić (yellow card) 24'; Juhász 71' (yellow card) 90+2'; Gomes (yellow card) 63'; Zé Luís (yellow card) 89'

DVTK Stadion, Miskolc
Attendance: 6,000
Referee: Sándor Andó-Szabó
