= Senad Husić =

Bosnian-Herzegovinian footballer (born 1990)

Personal information
- Date of birth: 12 April 1990 (age 36)
- Place of birth: Kalesija, Yugoslavia
- Height: 1.76 m (5 ft 9 in)
- Position: Left-back

Team information
- Current team: SC Pfullendorf
- Number: 8

Youth career
- 2008–2009: Bosna Kalesija

Senior career*
Years	Team	Apps	(Gls)
2009–2013	Zvijezda	84	(4)
2013–2016	Diósgyőr	51	(3)
2016	Željezničar Sarajevo	4	(0)
2017	Čelik Zenica	5	(0)
2018–2019	IFK Åmål		
2019	Llapi	11	(0)
2020	SV Neuhof		
2020–	SC Pfullendorf		

International career
2011–2012	Bosnia and Herzegovina U21	3	(0)
- * Club domestic league appearances and goals as of 22:35, 26 November 2019 (UTC)

Senad Husić (born 12 April 1990) is a Bosnian footballer who plays as a left-back for German amateur club SC Pfullendorf.

== Career statistics ==
As of match played 30 November 2014

Appearances and goals by club, season and competition
Club	Season	League			Cup		League Cup		Europe		Total	
Club	Season	Division	Apps	Goals	Apps	Goals	Apps	Goals	Apps	Goals	Apps	Goals
Zvijezda	2009–10	Bosnian Premier League	18	0	0	0	0	0	0	0	18	0
Zvijezda	2010–11	Bosnian Premier League	27	1	0	0	0	0	0	0	27	1
Zvijezda	2011–12	Bosnian Premier League	26	1	0	0	0	0	0	0	26	1
Zvijezda	2012–13	Bosnian Premier League	13	2	1	0	0	0	0	0	14	2
Zvijezda	Total		84	4	1	0	0	0	0	0	85	4
Diósgyőr	2013–14	Nemzeti Bajnokság I	16	1	5	0	10	0	0	0	31	1
Diósgyőr	2014–15	Nemzeti Bajnokság I	15	1	4	0	2	0	5	1	26	2
Diósgyőr	Total		31	2	9	0	12	0	5	1	57	3
Career total			115	6	10	0	12	0	5	1	142	7

== Honours ==
Diósgyőr

- Hungarian League Cup: 2013–14
