= William Alves (footballer, born 1986) =

Brazilian footballer (born 1986)

Personal information
- Full name: William Rocha Alves
- Date of birth: 7 May 1986 (age 40)
- Place of birth: Campinas, Brazil
- Height: 1.92 m (6 ft 4 in)
- Position: Centre-back

Youth career
- Palmeiras

Senior career*
Years	Team	Apps	(Gls)
2007	Portuguesa Santista		
2007	Shizuoka		
2008	Anapolina		
2008	Tombense		
2008	Slavija Novi Sad		
2009–2012	Borac Čačak	87	(2)
2013	Tombense	0	(0)
2013–2015	Diósgyőr	28	(1)
- * Club domestic league appearances and goals as of 11 March 2018

William Rocha Alves (born 7 May 1986) is a Brazilian professional footballer who plays as a centre-back.

== Career ==
Born in Campinas, William Alves came through the youth system at Palmeiras. He made his senior debuts with Portuguesa Santista in 2007. Later that year, William Alves moved abroad to Japan to play for lower league club Shizuoka.

In January 2008, William Alves returned to his homeland and played for Anapolina and Tombense, before moving abroad again, this time to Serbia, joining lower league club Slavija Novi Sad. He later switched to Serbian SuperLiga side Borac Čačak in the 2009 winter transfer window. In early 2013, William Alves returned to his former club Tombense.

In the summer of 2013, William Alves signed with Hungarian side Diósgyőr. He spent two years at the club, winning the League Cup in his debut season.

== Honours ==
Diósgyőr

- Ligakupa: 2013–14
