= Perutz Stadion =

Coordinates: 47.3349°N 17.4741°E

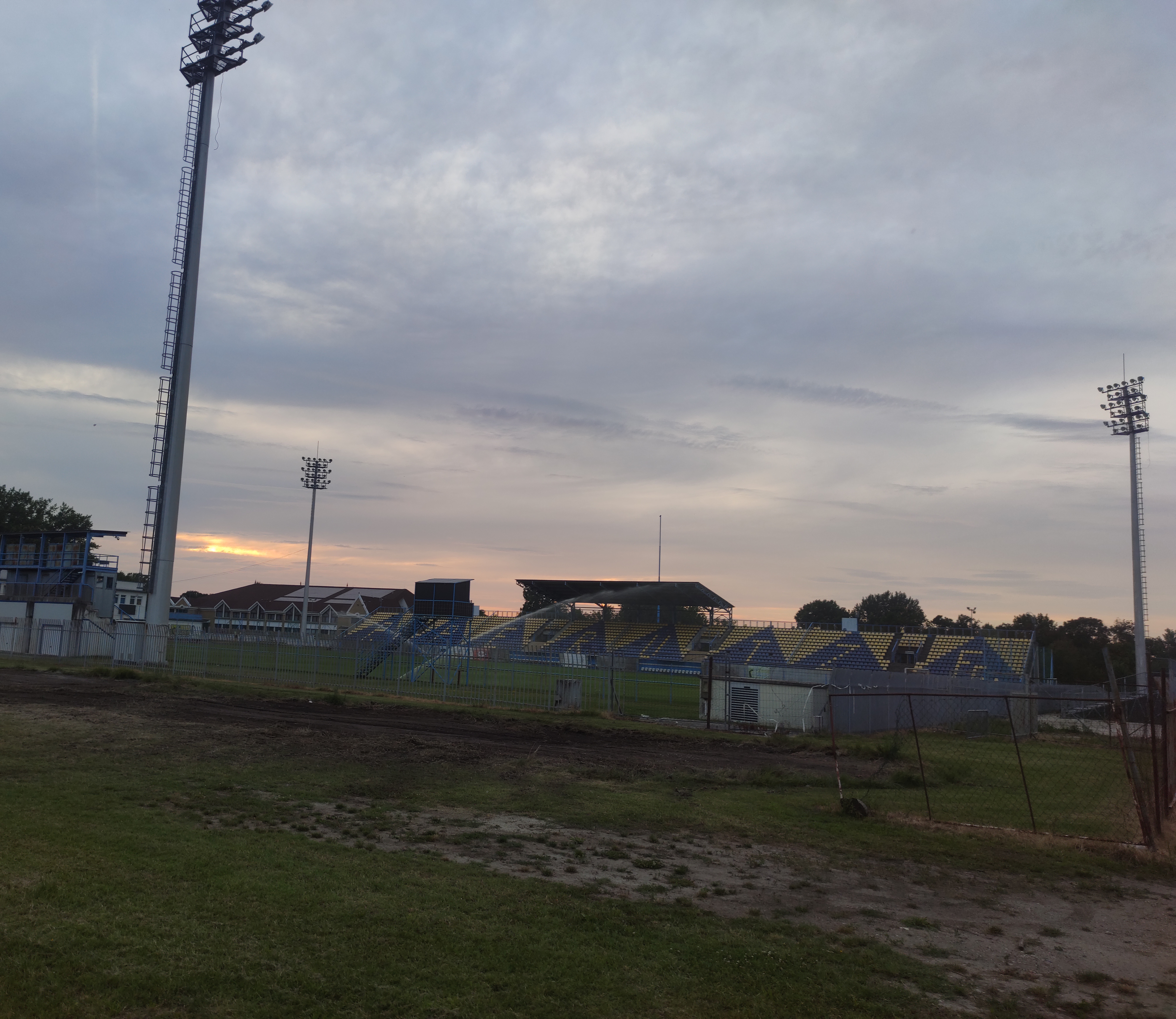
- Interactive map of Perutz Stadion
- Location: Pápa, Hungary
- Owner: Pápai PFC
- Capacity: 5,500
- Field size: 105 × 68 m

Tenants
- Pápai FC (1995–2015); Pápai PFC (2015–present)

Perutz Stadion is a multi-use stadium in Pápa, Hungary. It is currently used mostly for football matches and is the home ground of Lombard-Pápa TFC. The stadium is able to hold 5,000 people.
