= Ligakupa =

- Founded: 2007
- Abolished: 2015
- Region: Hungary
- Teams: 32
- Last champions: Ferencvárosi (2nd title)
- Most championships: Videoton FC (3 titles)
- Broadcaster: Sport TV

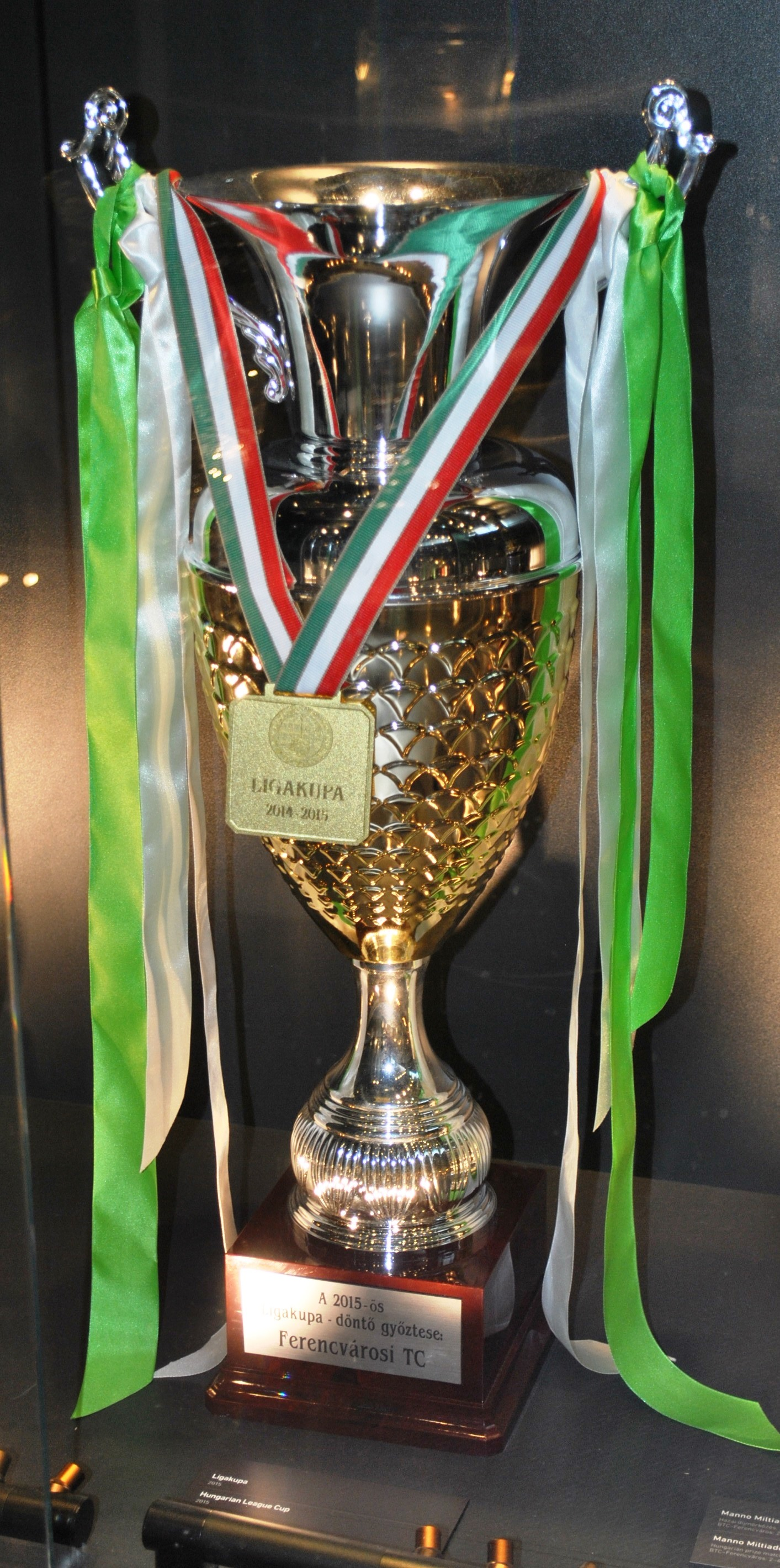
Trophy of the Hungarian League Cup 2016

The Hungarian League Cup (Hungarian: Magyar Ligakupa) was an annual football tournament contested by clubs in the Hungarian League. It was created in 2007 and the competition only lasted for 8 seasons, being cancelled ahead of the 2015–16 season.

== Ligakupa finals ==
The performance of various clubs is shown in the following table:

Season	Winner	Score	Runner-up
2007–08	Videoton	1–0 / 2–0	Debrecen
2008–09	Videoton	3–1	Pécsi FC
2009–10	Debrecen	2–1	Paks
2010–11	Paks	1–2 / 3–0	Debrecen
2011–12	Videoton	3–0	Kecskemét
2012–13	Ferencváros	5–1	Videoton
2013–14	Diósgyőr	2–1	Videoton
2014–15	Ferencváros	2–1	Debrecen

== Performance ==
=== Performances by club ===
Team	Winners	Runners-up	Winning years	Runners-up years
Videoton	3	2	2007–08, 2008–09, 2011–12	2012–13, 2013–14
Ferencváros	2	–	2012–13, 2014–15	–
Debrecen	1	3	2009–10	2007–08, 2010–11, 2014–15
Paks	1	1	2010–11	2009–10
Diósgyőr	1	–	2013–14	–
Pécsi	–	1	–	2008–09
Kecskemét	–	1	–	2011–12
