= Győr District =

Győr District Győri járás
- District
- Coat of arms

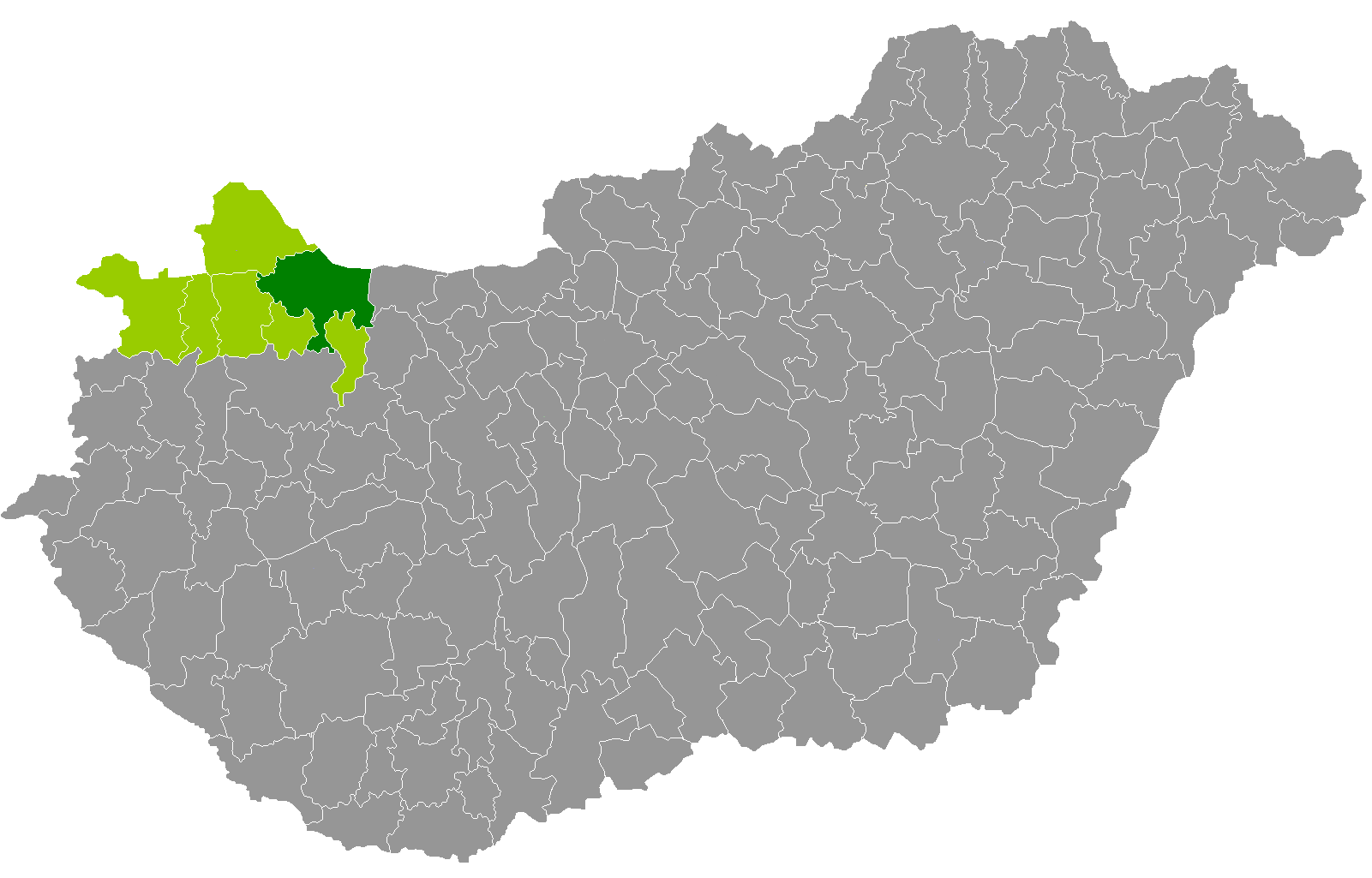
- Győr District within Hungary and Győr-Moson-Sopron County.
- Coordinates: 47.69°N 17.65°E
- Country: Hungary
- County: Győr-Moson-Sopron
- District seat: Győr

Area
  - Total: 903.40 km^{2} (348.80 sq mi)
  - Rank: 1st in Győr-Moson-Sopron

Population (2011 census)
  - Total: 190,146
  - Rank: 1st in Győr-Moson-Sopron
  - Density: 210/km^{2} (540/sq mi)

Győr (Hungarian: Győri járás) is a district in eastern part of Győr-Moson-Sopron County. Győr is also the town where the district seat is found. The district is located in the Western Transdanubia statistical region.

== Geography ==
Győr District borders with Mosonmagyaróvár District, the Slovak regions of Nitra Region and Trnava Region to the north, Komárom District and Kisbér District (Komárom-Esztergom County) to the east, Pannonhalma District and Pápa District (Veszprém County) to the south, and Tét District and Csorna District to the west. The number of municipalities in Győr District is 35.

== Municipalities ==
The district has one urban county (bolded) and 34 villages. (ordered by population, as of 1 January 2012)

- Abda (3,201)
- Bezi (510)
- Börcs (1,290)
- Bőny (2,153)
- Dunaszeg (2,006)
- Dunaszentpál (739)
- Enese (1,785)
- Fehértó (448)
- Gönyű (3,135)
- **Győr** (131,564) – district and county seat
- Győrladamér (1,623)
- Győrság (1,478)
- Győrsövényház (746)
- Győrújbarát (6,233)
- Győrújfalu (1,575)
- Győrzámoly (2,581)
- Ikrény (1,806)
- Kajárpéc (1,242)
- Kisbajcs (855)
- Koroncó (2,031)
- Kunsziget (1,256)
- Mezőörs (1,008)
- Mosonszentmiklós (2,282)
- Nagybajcs (935)
- Nagyszentjános (1,790)
- Nyúl (4,270)
- Öttevény (2,935)
- Pér (2,333)
- Rábapatona (2,426)
- Rétalap (554)
- Sokorópátka (1,081)
- Tényő (1,540)
- Töltéstava (2,217)
- Vámosszabadi (1,632)
- Vének (185)

== Demographics ==
Religion in Győr District (2011 census)
1. Catholic Church (48.6%)
2. Greek Catholicism (0.30%)
3. Lutheranism (4.40%)
4. Calvinism (4.10%)
5. Other religions (1.10%)
6. Non-religious (11.1%)
7. Atheists (1.20%)
8. Undeclared (29.2%)

In 2011, it had a population of 190,146 and the population density was 210/km^{2}.

| Year | County population | Change |
|---|---|---|
| 2011 | 190,146 | n/a |

=== Ethnicity ===
Besides the Hungarian majority, the main minorities are the German (approx. 2,800), Roma (1,300), Romanian (350), Slovak (300), Croat (200), Russian (150), Bulgarian and Polish (100).

Total population (2011 census): 190,146
Ethnic groups (2011 census): Identified themselves: 169,786 persons:

- Hungarians: 162,698 (95.82%)
- Germans: 2,825 (1.66%)
- Others and indefinable: 4,263 (2.51%)

Approx. 20,000 persons in Győr District did not declare their ethnic group at the 2011 census.

=== Religion ===
Religious adherence in the county according to 2011 census:

- Catholic – 92,924 (Roman Catholic – 92,361; Greek Catholic – 525);
- Evangelical – 8,349;
- Reformed – 7,844;
- other religions – 2,000;
- Non-religious – 21,134;
- Atheism – 2,391;
- Undeclared – 55,504.

== See also ==
- List of cities and towns in Hungary
