= 2014–15 Nyíregyháza Spartacus FC season =

Nyíregyháza Spartacus
2014–15 season
- Chairman: (Hungary) Zsolt Banka
- Manager: (Hungary) József Csábi
- Stadium: Városi Stadion
Home colours	Away colours

The 2014–15 season will be Nyíregyháza Spartacus's 1st consecutive season in the Nemzeti Bajnokság II and 86th year in existence as a football club.

== First team squad ==
Note: Flags indicate national team as defined under FIFA eligibility rules; some limited exceptions apply. Players may hold more than one non-FIFA nationality.

No.	Pos.	Nation	Player
4	DF	HUN	Gábor Jánvári
5	DF	HUN	Ferenc Fodor
7	MF	HUN	Tamás Huszák
9	FW	HUN	Krisztián Koller
10	MF	CMR	Mohamadolu Abdouraman
11	DF	HUN	János Patály
12	FW	HUN	Marcell Molnár
13	DF	HUN	Tamás Rubus
14	MF	SRB	Zoran Kostić
17	FW	HUN	Márk Szécsi (loan from Debrecen)
18	FW	HUN	Péter Bajzát
19	MF	HUN	Dávid Pákolicz
21	DF	HUN	Zsolt Szokol

No.	Pos.	Nation	Player
22	MF	HUN	Bence Lázár (loan from Újpest)
23	MF	HUN	István Spitzmüller
26	DF	HUN	Gergő Gengeliczki
28	DF	HUN	Zoltán Nagy (loan from Debrecen)
29	MF	HUN	István Sándor
31	DF	HUN	Krisztián Póti
33	MF	SRB	Boris Živanović
47	GK	HUN	János Balogh
77	FW	HUN	László Pekár
78	GK	UKR	Volodymyr Ovsienko
85	DF	HUN	Tamás Törtei
99	MF	HUN	László Rezes

== Transfers ==
=== Summer ===
In: Note: Flags indicate national team as defined under FIFA eligibility rules; some limited exceptions apply. Players may hold more than one non-FIFA nationality.

No.	Pos.	Nation	Player
1	GK	HUN	Alex Hrabina (from Nyíregyháza U-19)
5	DF	HUN	Ferenc Fodor (from Pécs)
9	FW	HUN	Krisztián Koller (from Pécs)
10	MF	CMR	Mohamadolu Abdouraman (from Diósgyőr)
14	MF	SRB	Zoran Kostić (from Diósgyőr)
17	FW	HUN	Márk Szécsi (loan from Debrecen)
22	MF	HUN	Bence Lázár (loan from Újpest)
23	MF	HUN	István Spitzmüller (from Debrecen)
28	DF	HUN	Zoltán Nagy (loan from Debrecen)
31	DF	HUN	Krisztián Póti (from Kecskemét)
33	MF	HUN	Boris Živanović (from Honvéd)
77	FW	HUN	László Pekár (from Kecskemét)

Out: Note: Flags indicate national team as defined under FIFA eligibility rules; some limited exceptions apply. Players may hold more than one non-FIFA nationality.

No.	Pos.	Nation	Player
3	MF	HUN	Mihály Ulvicki (to Jászapáti)
5	MF	HUN	Róbert Kis (to Balmazújváros)
6	MF	HUN	Donát Reznek (loan to Balmazújváros)
10	FW	HUN	Péter Szilágyi (to Békéscsaba)
14	MF	HUN	Szabolcs Csordás (to Ajka)
17	MF	HUN	Dániel Kákonyi (to Gyirmót)
19	FW	HUN	János Máté (loan return to Szolnok)
22	DF	HUN	Gábor Polényi (to Vasas)
22	MF	HUN	Bence Lázár (loan return to Újpest)
24	MF	HUN	Roland Paku (loan return to Győr II)
31	DF	HUN	Krisztián Póti

- List of Hungarian football transfers summer 2014

== Statistics ==
=== Appearances and goals ===
Last updated on 9 December 2014.

No.	Pos	Nat	Player	Total		OTP Bank Liga		Hungarian Cup		League Cup	
No.	Pos	Nat	Player	Apps	Goals	Apps	Goals	Apps	Goals	Apps	Goals
4	DF	(Hungary) HUN	Gábor Jánvári	18	0	8	0	2	0	8	0
5	DF	(Hungary) HUN	Ferenc Fodor	20	0	13	0	2	0	5	0
7	MF	(Hungary) HUN	Tamás Huszák	15	0	8	0	3	0	4	0
9	FW	(Hungary) HUN	Krisztián Koller	23	2	16	2	2	0	5	0
10	MF	(Cameroon) CMR	Mohamadolu Abdouraman	14	1	11	1	0	0	3	0
11	DF	(Hungary) HUN	János Patály	8	1	1	0	2	1	5	0
12	FW	(Hungary) HUN	Marcell Molnár	12	2	5	1	1	1	6	0
13	DF	(Hungary) HUN	Tamás Rubus	18	2	9	0	1	0	8	2
14	MF	(Serbia) SRB	Zoran Kostić	20	1	14	0	1	0	5	1
17	FW	(Hungary) HUN	Márk Szécsi	6	1	5	0	0	0	1	1
18	FW	(Hungary) HUN	Péter Bajzát	15	5	12	4	1	0	2	1
19	MF	(Hungary) HUN	Dávid Pákolicz	22	6	15	3	2	3	5	0
21	DF	(Hungary) HUN	Zsolt Szokol	19	1	12	1	1	0	6	0
22	FW	(Hungary) HUN	Bence Lázár	10	4	5	0	3	4	2	0
23	MF	(Hungary) HUN	István Spitzmüller	17	2	8	0	3	1	6	1
26	DF	(Hungary) HUN	Gergő Gengeliczki	17	0	10	0	2	0	5	0
28	DF	(Hungary) HUN	Zoltán Nagy	16	0	8	0	1	0	7	0
29	MF	(Hungary) HUN	István Sándor	20	4	9	0	3	2	8	2
31	DF	(Hungary) HUN	Krisztián Póti	6	0	3	0	2	0	1	0
33	MF	(Serbia) SRB	Boris Živanović	6	0	3	0	0	0	3	0
47	GK	(Hungary) HUN	János Balogh	18	-28	16	-25	1	-3	1	0
77	FW	(Hungary) HUN	László Pekár	24	13	14	4	3	6	7	3
78	GK	(Ukraine) UKR	Volodymyr Ovsienko	4	-5	1	-1	1	0	2	-4
85	DF	(Hungary) HUN	Tamás Törtei	20	1	13	1	2	0	5	0
99	MF	(Hungary) HUN	László Rezes	4	0	4	0	0	0	0	0
Youth players:
1	GK	(Hungary) HUN	Alex Hrabina	6	-3	0	0	1	0	5	-3
9	FW	(Hungary) HUN	Dávid Sárközi	3	0	0	0	1	0	2	0
17	MF	(Hungary) HUN	Márk Vámos	6	0	0	0	1	0	5	0
50	FW	(Hungary) HUN	Dávid Markovics	3	0	0	0	0	0	3	0
52	FW	(Hungary) HUN	Levente Baglyos	1	0	0	0	0	0	1	0
54	DF	(Hungary) HUN	Ákos Bagi	2	0	0	0	0	0	2	0
Players no longer at the club:

=== Top scorers ===
Includes all competitive matches. The list is sorted by shirt number when total goals are equal.

Last updated on 9 December 2014

Position	Nation	Number	Name	OTP Bank Liga	Hungarian Cup	League Cup	Total
1	(Hungary)	77	László Pekár	4	6	3	13
2	(Hungary)	19	Dávid Pákolicz	3	3	0	6
3	(Hungary)	18	Péter Bajzát	4	0	1	5
4	(Hungary)	22	Bence Lázár	0	4	0	4
5	(Hungary)	29	István Sándor	0	2	2	4
6	(Hungary)	9	Krisztián Koller	2	0	0	2
7	(Hungary)	12	Marcell Molnár	1	1	0	2
8	(Hungary)	23	István Spitzmüller	0	1	1	2
9	(Hungary)	13	Tamás Rubus	0	0	2	2
10	(Cameroon)	10	Mohamadolu Abdouraman	1	0	0	1
11	(Hungary)	85	Tamás Törtei	1	0	0	1
12	(Hungary)	21	Zsolt Szokol	1	0	0	1
13	(Hungary)	11	János Patály	0	1	0	1
14	(Hungary)	17	Márk Szécsi	0	0	1	1
15	(Serbia)	14	Zoran Kostić	0	0	1	1
/	/	/	Own Goals	0	0	0	0
			TOTALS	17	18	11	46

=== Disciplinary record ===
Includes all competitive matches. Players with 1 card or more included only.

Last updated on 9 December 2014

Position	Nation	Number	Name	OTP Bank Liga		Hungarian Cup		League Cup		Total (Hu Total)	
Position	Nation	Number	Name	Booked	Sent off (straight red)	Booked	Sent off (straight red)	Booked	Sent off (straight red)	Booked	Sent off (straight red)
DF	(Hungary)	4	Gábor Jánvári	1	1	0	0	1	0	2 (1)	1 (1)
DF	(Hungary)	5	Ferenc Fodor	4	1	1	0	0	0	5 (4)	1 (1)
MF	(Hungary)	7	Tamás Huszák	1	0	0	0	1	0	2 (1)	0 (0)
FW	(Hungary)	9	Krisztián Koller	2	0	0	0	0	0	2 (2)	0 (0)
MF	(Cameroon)	10	Mohamadolu Abdouraman	1	1	0	0	1	0	2 (1)	1 (1)
DF	(Hungary)	11	János Patály	0	0	1	0	2	0	3 (0)	0 (0)
DF	(Hungary)	13	Tamás Rubus	4	0	0	0	0	0	4 (4)	0 (0)
MF	(Serbia)	14	Zoran Kostić	3	0	0	0	0	0	3 (3)	0 (0)
FW	(Hungary)	18	Péter Bajzát	3	0	0	0	0	0	3 (3)	0 (0)
MF	(Hungary)	19	Dávid Pákolicz	1	0	0	0	0	0	1 (1)	0 (0)
DF	(Hungary)	21	Zsolt Szokol	0	0	1	0	1	0	2 (0)	0 (0)
FW	(Hungary)	22	Bence Lázár	0	0	1	0	0	0	1 (0)	0 (0)
MF	(Hungary)	23	István Spitzmüller	1	0	1	0	0	0	2 (1)	0 (0)
DF	(Hungary)	26	Gergő Gengeliczki	2	0	1	0	1	0	4 (2)	0 (0)
DF	(Hungary)	28	Zoltán Nagy	3	1	0	0	1	0	4 (3)	1 (1)
MF	(Hungary)	29	István Sándor	1	0	0	0	1	0	2 (1)	0 (0)
DF	(Hungary)	31	Krisztián Póti	1	0	0	0	0	0	1 (1)	0 (0)
GK	(Hungary)	47	János Balogh	2	0	0	0	0	0	2 (2)	0 (0)
MF	(Serbia)	53	Boris Živanović	0	0	0	0	1	0	1 (0)	0 (0)
FW	(Hungary)	77	László Pekár	0	0	1	0	0	0	1 (0)	0 (0)
DF	(Hungary)	85	Tamás Törtei	5	0	1	0	0	0	6 (5)	0 (0)
MF	(Hungary)	99	László Rezes	1	0	0	0	0	0	1 (1)	0 (0)
			TOTALS	36	4	8	0	10	0	54 (36)	4 (4)

=== Overall ===
Games played	27 (16 OTP Bank Liga, 3 Hungarian Cup and 8 Hungarian League Cup)
Games won	11 (4 OTP Bank Liga, 2 Hungarian Cup and 5 Hungarian League Cup)
Games drawn	4 (2 OTP Bank Liga, 0 Hungarian Cup and 2 Hungarian League Cup)
Games lost	12 (10 OTP Bank Liga, 1 Hungarian Cup and 1 Hungarian League Cup)
Goals scored	46
Goals conceded	35
Goal difference	+11
Yellow cards	54
Red cards	4
Worst discipline	(Hungary) Ferenc Fodor (5 (yellow card) , 1 (red card) )
Best result	8–0 (A) v Kalocsa - OTP Bank Liga - 13-08-2014
Best result	8–0 (A) v Győrsövényház - OTP Bank Liga - 10-09-2014
Worst result	0–5 (A) v Debrecen - OTP Bank Liga - 30-11-2014
Most appearances	(Hungary) László Pekár (24 appearances)
Top scorer	(Hungary) László Pekár (13 goals)
Points	37/81 (45.68%)

Last updated: 9 December 2014

== Nemzeti Bajnokság I ==
=== Matches ===
25 July 2014 1	Nyíregyháza	1 – 1	Debrecen	Nyíregyháza, Szabolcs-Szatmár-Bereg County
19:00 CEST	Pekár 73'	Report	Seydi 39'	Stadium: Városi Stadion; Attendance: 4,828; Referee: (Hungary) Viktor Kassai

2 August 2014 2	Nyíregyháza	0 – 3	Paks	Nyíregyháza, Szabolcs-Szatmár-Bereg County
18:30 CEST		Report	Eppel 17'; Heffler 41' (pen.); Könyves 75'	Stadium: Városi Stadion; Attendance: 2,245; Referee: (Hungary) Zsolt Szabó

9 August 2014 3	Honvéd	0 – 1	Nyíregyháza	Budapest, Pest County
16:30 CEST		Report	Bajzát 63'	Stadium: Bozsik Stadion; Attendance: 1,020; Referee: (Hungary) Ádám Farkas

16 August 2014 4	Nyíregyháza	0 – 2	Videoton	Nyíregyháza, Szabolcs-Szatmár-Bereg County
16:30 CEST		Report	Kovács 8'; Nikolić 77'	Stadium: Városi Stadion; Attendance: 2,744; Referee: (Hungary) Péter Solymosi

24 August 2014 5	Ferencváros	3 – 1	Nyíregyháza	Budapest, Pest County
16:30 CEST	Busai 13'; Gera 28'; Mateos 66' (pen.)	Report	Bajzát 78'	Stadium: Groupama Arena; Attendance: 12,128; Referee: (Hungary) István Vad

30 August 2014 6	Nyíregyháza	3 – 0	Pápa	Nyíregyháza, Szabolcs-Szatmár-Bereg County
18:30 CEST	Abdouraman 9'; Bajzát 12'; Pekár 90+3'	Report		Stadium: Sóstói Stadion; Attendance: 2,097; Referee: (Hungary) Zoltán Iványi

13 September 2014 7	Nyíregyháza	0 – 0	Dunaújváros	Nyíregyháza, Szabolcs-Szatmár-Bereg County
18:30 CEST		Report		Stadium: Városi Stadion; Attendance: 2,108; Referee: (Hungary) Tamás Bognár

20 September 2014 8	Nyíregyháza	2 – 3	Győr	Nyíregyháza, Szabolcs-Szatmár-Bereg County
14:30 CEST	Pákolicz 18'; Bajzát 69'	Report	Rudolf 8', 32'; Priskin 51'	Stadium: Városi Stadion; Attendance: 2,002; Referee: (Hungary) István Vad

27 September 2014 9	Kecskemét	1 – 0	Nyíregyháza	Kecskemét, Bács-Kiskun County
14:30 CEST	Bebeto 35'	Report		Stadium: Széktói Stadion; Attendance: 1,103; Referee: (Hungary) Viktor Kassai

5 October 2014 10	MTK	2 – 0	Nyíregyháza	Budapest, Pest County
16:30 CEST	Torghelle 27'; Hidvégi 76'	Report		Stadium: Bozsik Stadion; Attendance: 500; Referee: (Hungary) Ádám Farkas

18 October 2014 11	Nyíregyháza	0 – 1	Puskás	Nyíregyháza, Szabolcs-Szatmár-Bereg County
16:00 CEST		Report	Tischler 37'	Stadium: Városi Stadion; Attendance: 1,686; Referee: (Hungary) Sándor Andó-Szabó

24 October 2014 12	Újpest	3 – 2	Nyíregyháza	Budapest, Pest County
19:00 CEST	Simon 12'; Bardhi 27'; Stanisavljević 83'	Report	Pekár 42'; Molnár 88'	Stadium: Szusza Ferenc Stadium; Attendance: 2,000; Referee: (Hungary) József Erdős

1 November 2014 13	Nyíregyháza	2 – 0	Haladás	Nyíregyháza, Szabolcs-Szatmár-Bereg County
16:00 CET	Koller 64'; Törtei 76'	Report		Stadium: Városi Stadion; Attendance: 1,561; Referee: (Hungary) Ádám Németh

9 November 2014 14	Diósgyőr	2 – 1	Nyíregyháza	Diósgyőr, Borsod-Abaúj-Zemplén County
18:30 CET	Griffiths 60'; Marjanović 75'	Report	Pákolicz 18'	Stadium: DVTK Stadion; Attendance: 5,906; Referee: (Hungary) Viktor Kassai

22 November 2014 15	Nyíregyháza	4 – 0	Pécs	Nyíregyháza, Szabolcs-Szatmár-Bereg County
18:00 CET	Szokol 25'; Pekár 67' (pen.); Koller 88'; Pákolicz 90+2'	Report		Stadium: Városi Stadion; Attendance: 1,559; Referee: (Hungary) Tamás Bognár

30 November 2014 16	Debrecen	5 – 0	Nyíregyháza	Debrecen, Hajdú-Bihar County
16:30 CET	Sidibe 12', 72'; Tisza 26', 33' (pen.); Szakály 90+2' (pen.)	Report		Stadium: Nagyerdei Stadion; Attendance: 2,612; Referee: (Hungary) István Vad

=== Classification ===
Pos	Team	Pld	W	D	L	GF	GA	GD	Pts	Qualification or relegation
10	Puskás Akadémia	30	10	5	15	35	40	−5	35	
11	Pécs (R)	30	8	7	15	32	51	−19	31	Relegation to Baranya County Football League One (Note: Kecskemét, Nyíregyháza and Pécs won't be members of 2015–16 Nemzeti Bajnokság I due to licence problems)
12	Nyíregyháza (R)	30	8	6	16	33	49	−16	30	Relegation to Nemzeti Bajnokság III
13	Honvéd	30	6	10	14	26	36	−10	28	
14	Haladás	30	7	4	19	26	53	−27	25	

Source: mlsz.hu (in Hungarian)
Rules for classification: 1st points; 2nd overall wins; 3rd goal difference; 4th head-to-head points; 5th head-to-head goal difference; 6th head-to-head away goals scored; 7th fair-play points; 8th drawing of lots
(R) Relegated

=== Results summary ===
Overall								Home						Away					
Pld	W	D	L	GF	GA	GD	Pts	W	D	L	GF	GA	GD	W	D	L	GF	GA	GD
16	4	2	10	17	26	−9	14	3	2	3	10	7	+3	1	0	7	7	19	−12

Last updated: 30 November 2014.
Source: NB1

=== Results by round ===
Round	1	2	3	4	5	6	7	8	9	10	11	12	13	14	15	16	17	18	19	20	21	22	23	24	25	26	27	28	29	30
Ground	H	H	A	H	A	H	H	H	A	A	H	A	H	A	H	A														
Result	D	L	W	L	L	W	D	L	L	L	L	L	W	L	W	L														
Position	9	13	9	10	12	11	10	10	14	14	14	14	12	12	11	11														

Updated to match(es) played on 30 November 2014. Source: Matches
A = Away; H = Home; W = Win; D = Draw; L = Loss

== Hungarian Cup ==
13 August 2014 Round 1	Kalocsa	0 – 8	Nyíregyháza	Kalocsa, Bács-Kiskun County
17:00 CEST		Report	Pekár 4', 56', 76'; Pákolicz 7', 62'; Lázár 12'; Sándor 19', 50'	Stadium: Városi Sporttelep; Referee: (Hungary) Tibor Farkas

10 September 2014 Round 2	Győrsövényház	0 – 8	Nyíregyháza	Győrsövényház, Győr-Moson-Sopron County
15:30 CEST		Report	Pekár 5', 8', 32'; Lázár 12' (pen.), 39', 48'; Molnár 30'; Patály 84'	Stadium: Városi Sporttelep; Attendance: 300; Referee: (Hungary) Gergely Kovács

24 September 2014 Round 3	Kisvárda	3 – 2	Nyíregyháza	Kisvárda, Szabolcs-Szatmár-Bereg County
15:00 CEST	Ramos 57'; Erős 70'; Brankovics 79'	Report	Spitzmüller 4'; Pákolicz 11'	Stadium: Stadion Várkerti; Attendance: 1,200; Referee: (Hungary) Roland Veizer

== League Cup ==
2 September 2014 1	Szolnok	0 – 2	Nyíregyháza	Szolnok, Jász-Nagykun-Szolnok County
17:00 CEST		Report	Spitzmüller 19'; Pekár 36'	Stadium: Tiszaligeti Stadion; Attendance: 150; Referee: (Hungary) Balázs Böcskei

16 September 2014 2	Nyíregyháza	3 – 0	Cegléd	Nyíregyháza, Szabolcs-Szatmár-Bereg County
16:00 CEST	Sándor 44'; Szécsi 50'; Rubus 68'	Report		Stadium: Városi Stadion; Attendance: 400; Referee: (Hungary) László Lovas

7 October 2014 3	Diósgyőr	3 – 0	Nyíregyháza	Miskolc, Borsod-Abaúj-Zemplén County
17:00 CEST	Icsó 9'; Bacsa 16'; Csirszki 44'	Report		Stadium: DVTK Stadion; Attendance: 1,328; Referee: (Hungary) Tamás Nazsa

14 October 2014 4	Nyíregyháza	0 – 0	Diósgyőr	Nyíregyháza, Szabolcs-Szatmár-Bereg County
14:00 CEST		Report		Stadium: Városi Stadion; Attendance: 500; Referee: (Hungary) József Berger

11 November 2014 5	Cegléd	1 – 2	Nyíregyháza	Cegléd, Pest County
13:30 CET	Füle 85'	Report	Sándor 10'; Rubus 50'	Stadium: Stadion Malomtó széli Attendance: 100; Referee: (Hungary) Róbert Nagy

18 November 2014 6	Nyíregyháza	1 – 0	Szolnok	Nyíregyháza, Szabolcs-Szatmár-Bereg County
13:00 CET	Pekár 4'	Report		Stadium: Városi Stadion; Attendance: 200; Referee: (Hungary) Tamás Nazsa

Pos	Team	Pld	W	D	L	GF	GA	GD	Pts	Qualification	NYÍ	DIÓ	CEG	SZO
1	Nyíregyháza	6	4	1	1	8	4	+4	13	Advance to knockout phase	—	0–0	3–0	1–0
2	Diósgyőr	6	3	1	2	12	8	+4	10	Advance to knockout phase	3–0	—	3–1	4–1
3	Cegléd	6	2	0	4	9	12	−3	6		1–2	4–1	—	2–1
4	Szolnok	6	2	0	4	6	11	−5	6		0–2	2–1	2–1	—

Source: Soccerway

=== Knockout phase ===
2 December 2014 Round of 16	Békéscsaba	2 – 2	Nyíregyháza	Békéscsaba, Békés County
13:00 CET	Szilágyi 59'; Balázs 84' (pen.)	Report	Pekár 22'; Bajzát 28'	Stadium: Stadion Kórház utcai Attendance: 100; Referee: (Hungary) Ádám Radványi

9 December 2014 Round of 16	Nyíregyháza	1 – 0 (3 – 2 agg.)	Békéscsaba	Nyíregyháza, Szabolcs-Szatmár-Bereg County
13:00 CET	Kostić 88'	Report		Stadium: Városi Stadion; Attendance: 100; Referee: (Hungary) Róbert Nagy
