= Utal =

Former Hungarian village

Utal was a medieval village, later an abandoned place in Győr county in Hungary, near to Bezi.

In 1519, Count György Cseszneky had estates in the village.
