= Michael I =

Michael I may refer to:

- Pope Michael I of Alexandria, Coptic Pope of Alexandria and Patriarch of the See of St. Mark in 743–767
- Michael I Rangabe, Byzantine Emperor (died in 844)
- Michael I Cerularius, Patriarch Michael I of Constantinople (c. 1000–1059)
- Michael I of Duklja, Prince and King of Duklja and (d. 1081)
- Mikhail of Vladimir (died in 1176)
- Michael I Komnenos Doukas (died in 1215)
- Michael I of Russia (1596–1645)
- Michael I of Poland (Michał Korybut Wiśniowiecki), King of Poland and Grand Duke of Lithuania (1640-1673)
- Michael I of Portugal (1802–1866)
- Michael I of Serbia (1823–1868)
- Mihály Cseszneky de Milvány et Csesznek, Michael I of Macedonia (1910–1975)
- Michael I of Romania (1921–2017)
- Michael I, regnal name of conclavist antipope David Bawden (1959-2022)

== See also ==
- Michael (disambiguation)
