= Kisbabot =

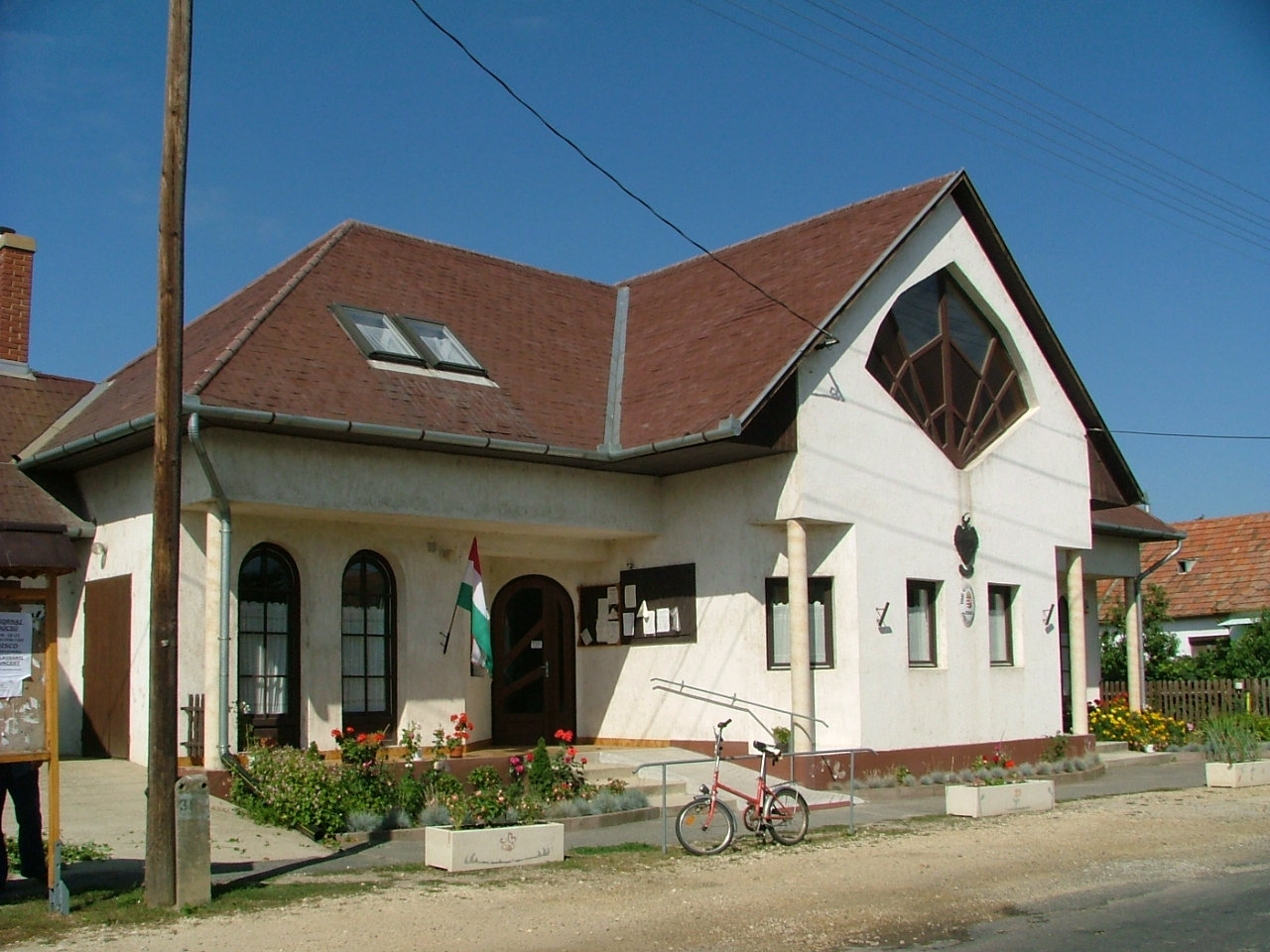
- Village hall

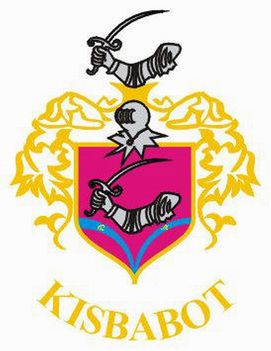
- Coat of arms

- Location of Győr-Moson-Sopron county in Hungary

- Location of Kisbabot
- Coordinates: 47.55590°N 17.41449°E
- Country: Hungary
- County: Győr-Moson-Sopron

Area
  - Total: 6.1 km^{2} (2.4 sq mi)

Population (2004)
  - Total: 228
  - Density: 37.37/km^{2} (96.8/sq mi)
- Time zone: UTC+1 (CET)
  - Summer (DST): UTC+2 (CEST)
- Postal code: 9133
- Area code: 96

Kisbabot is a village in Győr-Moson-Sopron county, Hungary.

In 1534 King Ferdinand I donated the village to Count György Cseszneky. In 1592 Count János Cseszneky was its lord with other Cseszneky heirs, in 1611 István Darkó, Count Márton Cseszneky, Tamás Babothy and Farkas Hegyi were the owners of Kisbabot.
