= Enese =

- Flag Coat of arms

- Location of Győr-Moson-Sopron county in Hungary

- Location of Enese
- Coordinates: 47.64571°N 17.42054°E
- Country: Hungary
- County: Győr-Moson-Sopron

Area
  - Total: 19.89 km^{2} (7.68 sq mi)

Population (2004)
  - Total: 1,742
  - Density: 87.58/km^{2} (226.8/sq mi)
- Time zone: UTC+1 (CET)
  - Summer (DST): UTC+2 (CEST)
- Postal code: 9143
- Area code: 96
- Motorways: M85
- Distance from Budapest: 141 km (88 mi) East

Enese is a village in Győr-Moson-Sopron county, Hungary.

In 1526 it was property of Count György Cseszneky and during 16-17th centuries of the Cseszneky and Enessey families.
