= György Cseszneky de Milvány et Csesznek =

Hungarian aristocrat

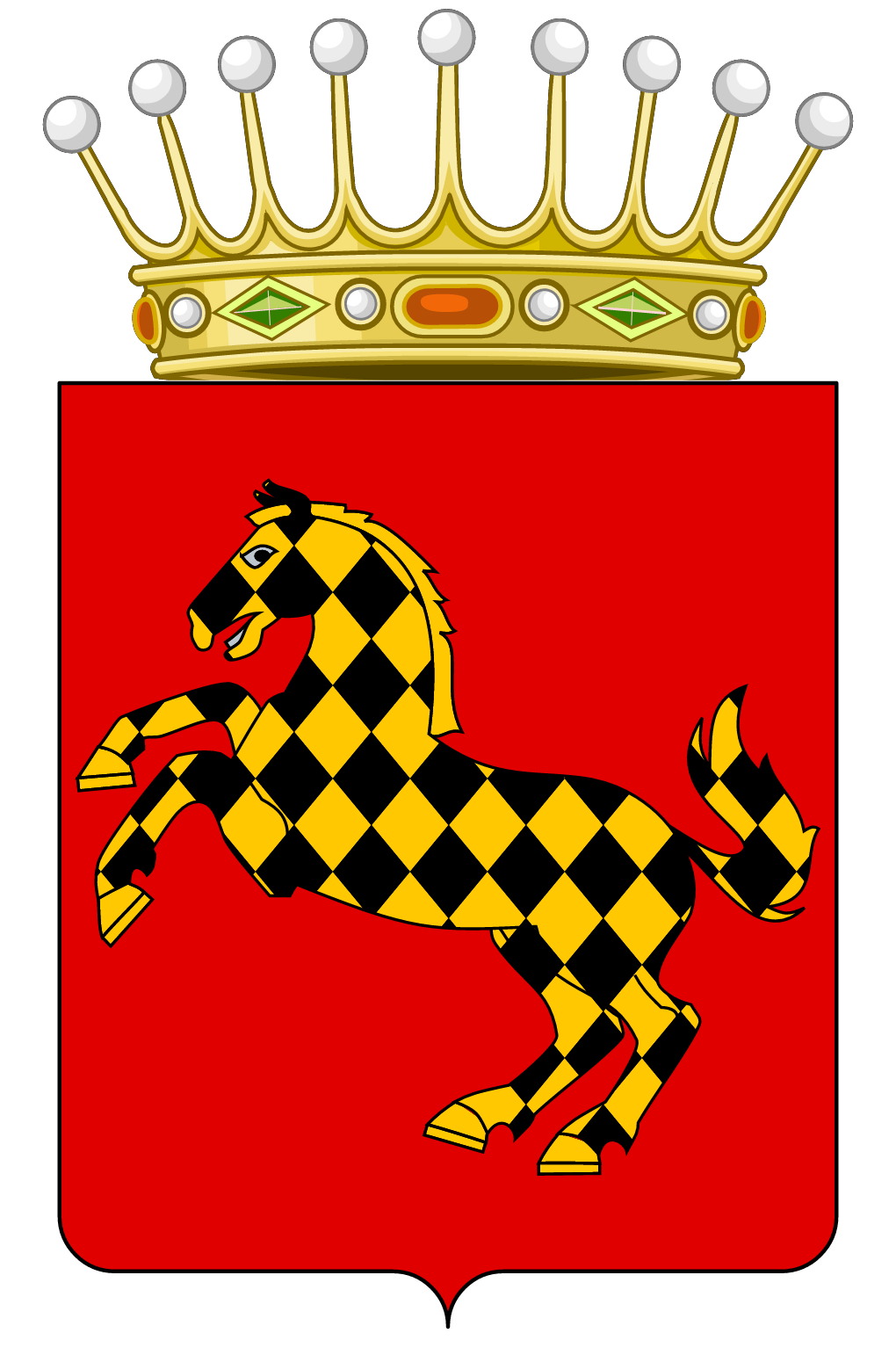
Count Cseszneky coat of arms

György Cseszneky de Milvány et Csesznek was a Hungarian aristocrat in the 16th century and a member of the Cseszneky family.

In 1526 when the disastrous battle with the Turks happened and Louis II died in the battlefield, György Cseszneky was the castellan of the Castle of Tata. The plundering Ottoman army ransacked the area, but Cseszneky successfully defended the castle. In the struggle for the throne of Hungary between Voivode John Zapolya and Archduke Ferdinand of Habsburg, he supported Ferdinand's claim. In 1528 he and Tamás Nádasdy occupied the castle of Győr for Ferdinand of Habsburg. Queen Mary, widow of King Louis II and sister of Ferdinand, appointed him royal court judge of Győr. In 1532 when the Emperor Charles V had sent Garcilaso de la Vega into exile to an island in the Danube, Count Cseszneky was responsible for the provision of the Spanish poet. Later György became a devoted follower of Protestantism and defender of the Lutheran faith. King Ferdinand I bestowed upon him the Hungarian magnate title, awarded him with the right of use of red sealing wax and donated him several estates, among them: Alsóbük, Felsőpulya, Kisbabot, Enese, Rábacsécsény and Utal villages.

== Sources ==
- Jászay Pál: A magyar nemzet napjai a mohácsi vész után. Pest, 1846.
- Bunyitay Vince: Egyháztörténeti emlékek a magyarországi hitújítás korából
- Szávay Gyula: Győr: monográfia a város jelenkoráról a történelmi idők érintésével
- Payr Sándor: A dunántúli evangélikus egyházkerület története
