= Stráňany =

- Municipality
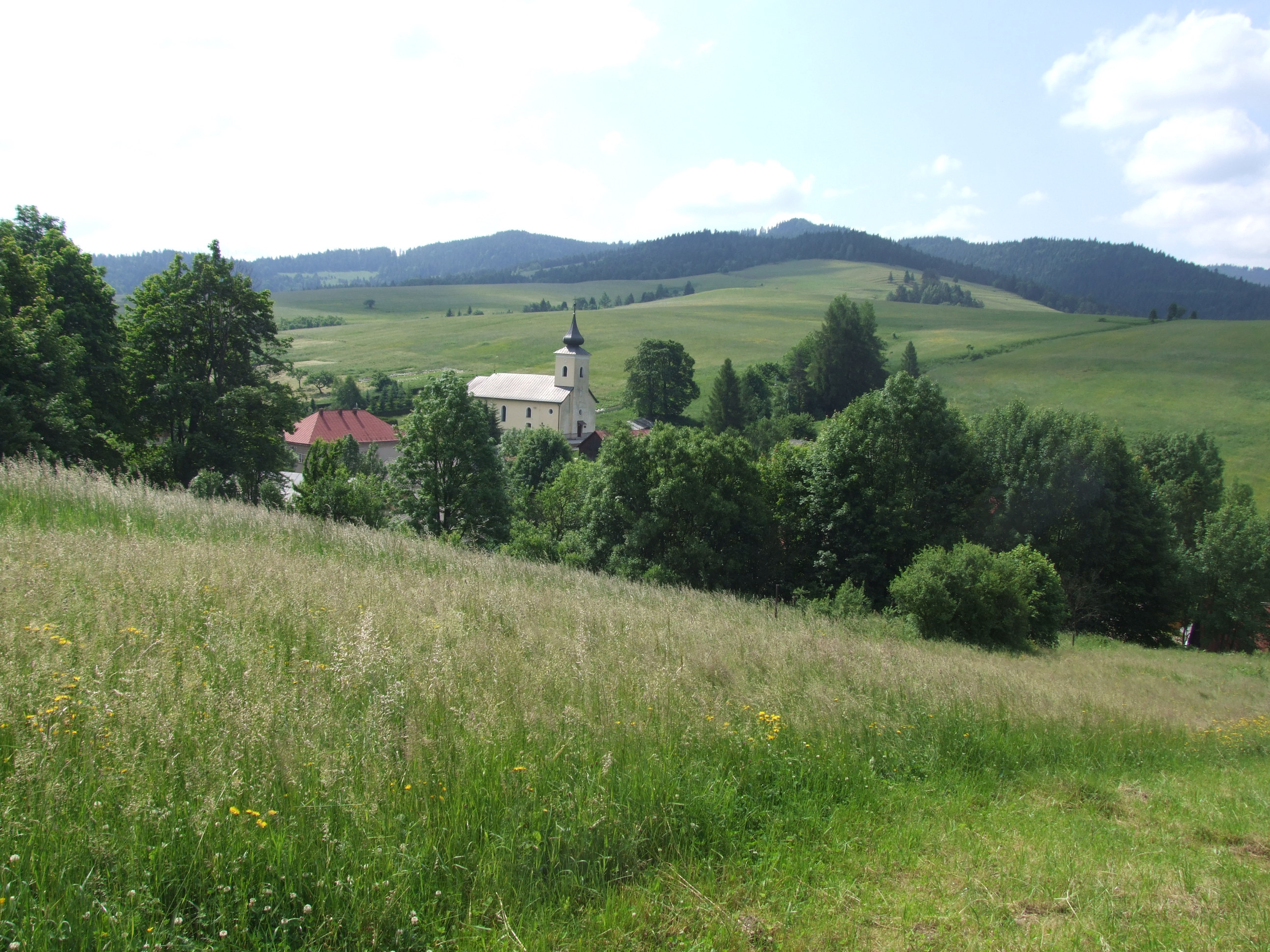

- Flag

- Location of Stráňany in the Prešov Region Location of Stráňany in Slovakia
- Coordinates: 49.37°N 20.53°E
- Country: Slovakia
- Region: Prešov Region
- District: Stará Ľubovňa District
- First mentioned: 1343

Area
  - Total: 11.60 km^{2} (4.48 sq mi)
- Elevation: 640 m (2,100 ft)

Population (2025)
  - Total: 187
- Time zone: UTC+1 (CET)
  - Summer (DST): UTC+2 (CEST)
- Postal code: 653 3
- Area code: +421 52
- Vehicle registration plate (until 2022): SL
- Website: stranany.sk

Stráňany (until 1948: Folvark; Hungarian: Nagymajor; Polish: Folwark; Rusyn: Страняны) is a village and municipality in Stará Ľubovňa District in the Prešov Region of northern Slovakia. The village is traditionally inhabited by Rusyns, as one of their westernmost settlements. There is Greek Catholic church built in 1857.

== History ==
In historical records the village was first mentioned in 1343. Initially it was a hamlet of Veľký Lipník with a folvark (hence the name prior to 1948). Around 1567 Vlachs settled here, who would later become Rusyns. Before the establishment of independent Czechoslovakia in 1918, Folwark was part of Szepes County within the Kingdom of Hungary. From 1939 to 1945, it was part of the Slovak Republic. On 25 January 1945, the Red Army dislodged the Wehrmacht from Folwark and it was once again part of Czechoslovakia.

== Geography ==
The municipality lies at an altitude of 640 metres (2,100 ft) and covers an area of 11.60 km^{2} (4.48 sq mi) (2025).

== Population ==
Population statistic (10 years)
Year	1995	2005	2015	2025
Count	232	193	194	187
Difference		−16.81%	+0.51%	−3.60%

Population statistic
Year	2024	2025
Count	180	187
Difference		+3.88%

It has a population of 187 people (31 December 2025).

=== Ethnicity ===
Census 2021 (1+ %)
Ethnicity	Number	Fraction
Slovak	149	79.67%
Rusyn	105	56.14%
Not found out	6	3.2%
Total	187	

In year 2021 was 187 people by ethnicity 149 as Slovak, 105 as Rusyn, 6 as Not found out and 1 as Czech.

Note on population: The difference values of population numbers in the table "Population statistic" and in the sections "Ethnicity" & "Religion" is caused by the use of various statistical methods.

=== Religion ===
Census 2021 (1+ %)
Religion	Number	Fraction
Greek Catholic Church	151	80.75%
Roman Catholic Church	22	11.76%
None	11	5.88%
Not found out	2	1.07%
Total	187	

In year 2021 was 187 people by religion 151 from Greek Catholic Church, 22 from Roman Catholic Church, 11 from None, 2 from Not found out and 1 from Eastern Orthodox Church.

== Notable people ==
- Gyula Cseszneky, Hungarian aristocrat, poet, cavalry officer.
