= Imre Cseszneky de Milvány et Csesznek =

Count Imre Cseszneky de Milvány et Csesznek (1804–1874) was a Hungarian agriculturist and patriot, born in 1804 to the impoverished Bácska branch of the Cseszneky family.

In the 1830s, he served as lieutenant. Later he became a talented agriculturist landowner in Szabadka area, who following the steps of Count István Széchenyi gained distinction by developing Hungarian horse breeding.

Cseszneky was the patron of the notable poet, Pál Jámbor (Hiador). Following the advice of Lajos Kossuth, he endorsed Mihály Vörösmarty's election (in the Bácsalmás electoral district to the parliament).

In 1848, he supported with his fortune the establishment of the National Guard (Nemzetőrség) and the Defence Forces of Bácska, in which his brother fought at Csantavér against the Serbian rebels. Due to his role in the Hungarian Revolution of 1848 he suffered serious reprisal under the Serbian Voivodship. He died in 1874.
