= Mihály Cseszneky de Milvány et Csesznek =

Hungarian industrialist

Count Mihály Mátyás Cseszneky de Milvány et Csesznek (1910–1975) was a Hungarian industrialist and nobleman, and nominal Grand Voivode of Macedonia.

Count Mihály Cseszneky's father was an inventor and impoverished aristocrat, while his mother was the only daughter and heir of a wealthy grain merchant with extended commercial links throughout Austria-Hungary and the Balkans. After World War I, most of their properties were confiscated by the Serbian government.

In the 1930s, Count Cseszneky played an important role in the restoration of the mill industry of Hungary. In September 1943, after the forced abdication of his brother Count Gyula Cseszneky de Milvány et Csesznek, he was proclaimed Grand Voivode of Macedonia, but he did not respond to the offer. During the Nazi German occupation of Hungary he actively helped his former business partner Giorgio Perlasca to save the life of the persecuted Jews.

After World War II his properties were confiscated by the Hungarian and Yugoslav Communist regimes. As an aristocrat and prominent supporter of the Civic Democratic Party, he was labelled a class enemy and was deported to a re-education camp, along with his wife and young children. As a political prisoner, Count Mihály Cseszneky spent several years in jail and forced labour camps in Komló and Sztálinváros. He died in 1975.

Count Mihály married a Hungarian noble lady with whom he had four children, among them Count László Cseszneky de Milvány et Csesznek, whose son Count Miklós Cseszneky de Milvány et Csesznek is the current head of the family.
