= Benedek Cseszneky de Milvány et Csesznek =

Hungarian nobleman

Count Benedek Cseszneky de Milvány et Csesznek was a Hungarian nobleman in the 17th century, a member of the Cseszneky family.

Benedek Cseszneky took part in several combats against the Ottomans and in 1626 he was a peace negotiator between King Ferdinand II and Gabriel Bethlen, prince of Transylvania that led to the Peace of Pozsony. King Ferdinand II donated to Benedek new properties in Csallóköz.

For the influence of Péter Pázmány he converted from Protestantism to Roman Catholicism and his descendants would study at the Jesuit University in Nagyszombat, founded by the Cardinal Pázmány. His wife was Sára Kánya de Budafalva. Probably, Mátyás Bél, the famous theologian and polymath was also their descendant.

== Sources ==
- Szlovák Nemzeti Levéltár
- Sankó L.: A csallóközi nemesi közbirtokosság
- Slachta bratislavskej stolice
