= Swine vesicular disease =

Swine vesicular disease virus

Virus classification
- (unranked): Virus
- Realm: Riboviria
- Kingdom: Orthornavirae
- Phylum: Pisuviricota
- Class: Pisoniviricetes
- Order: Picornavirales
- Family: Picornaviridae
- Genus: Enterovirus
- Species: Enterovirus B
- Strain: Swine vesicular disease virus

Viral disease of swine

Swine vesicular disease (SVD) is an acute, contagious viral disease of swine caused by swine vesicular disease virus, an Enterovirus. It is characterized by fever and vesicles with subsequent ulcers in the mouth and on the snout, feet, and teats. The pathogen is relatively resistant to heat, and can persist for a long time in salted, dried, and smoked meat products. Swine vesicular disease does not cause economically important disease, but is important due to its similarity to foot-and-mouth disease.

== Transmission ==
Swine vesicular disease is most commonly brought into a herd by the introduction of a subclinically infected pig. The disease can be transmitted in feed containing infected meat scraps, or by direct contact with infected feces (such as in an improperly cleaned truck).

== Clinical signs ==
After an incubation period up to 7 days, the signs associated with swine vesicular disease occur. The first sign is a transient mild fever. Other signs include:

- Vesicles in the mouth and on the snout and feet
- Lameness and an unsteady gait, shivering, and jerking–type leg movements
- Ruptured vesicles can cause ulcers on limbs and feet, and foot pads may be loosened.

Young animals are more severely affected. Recovery often occurs within a week. Mortality is negligible.

Swine vesicular disease has the same clinical signs as foot-and-mouth disease, and can only be diagnosed by laboratory testing.

== Prevention and control ==
No vaccine exists for SVD. Prevention measures are similar to those for foot-and-mouth disease: controlling animals imported from infected areas, sanitary disposal of garbage from international aircraft and ships, and thorough cooking of garbage. Infected animals should be placed in strict quarantine. Eradication measures for the disease include quarantining infected areas, depopulation and disposal of infected and contact pigs, and cleaning and disinfecting contaminated premises.

== History ==
Swine vesicular disease was first identified in Italy in 1966. In 1971, an outbreak occurred in Hong Kong, and the disease was subsequently found other countries in Europe and Asia.
