= Gyula Cseszneky =

Hungarian aristocrat

Count Gyula Cseszneky
- Born: 28 June 1914; Nagymajor, Szepes County, Kingdom of Hungary, Austria-Hungary (present-day Stráňany, Slovakia)
- Died: 1970; Brazil
Names
- Gyula István Cseszneky de Milvány et Csesznek
- House: House of Cseszneky
- Religion: Roman Catholicism

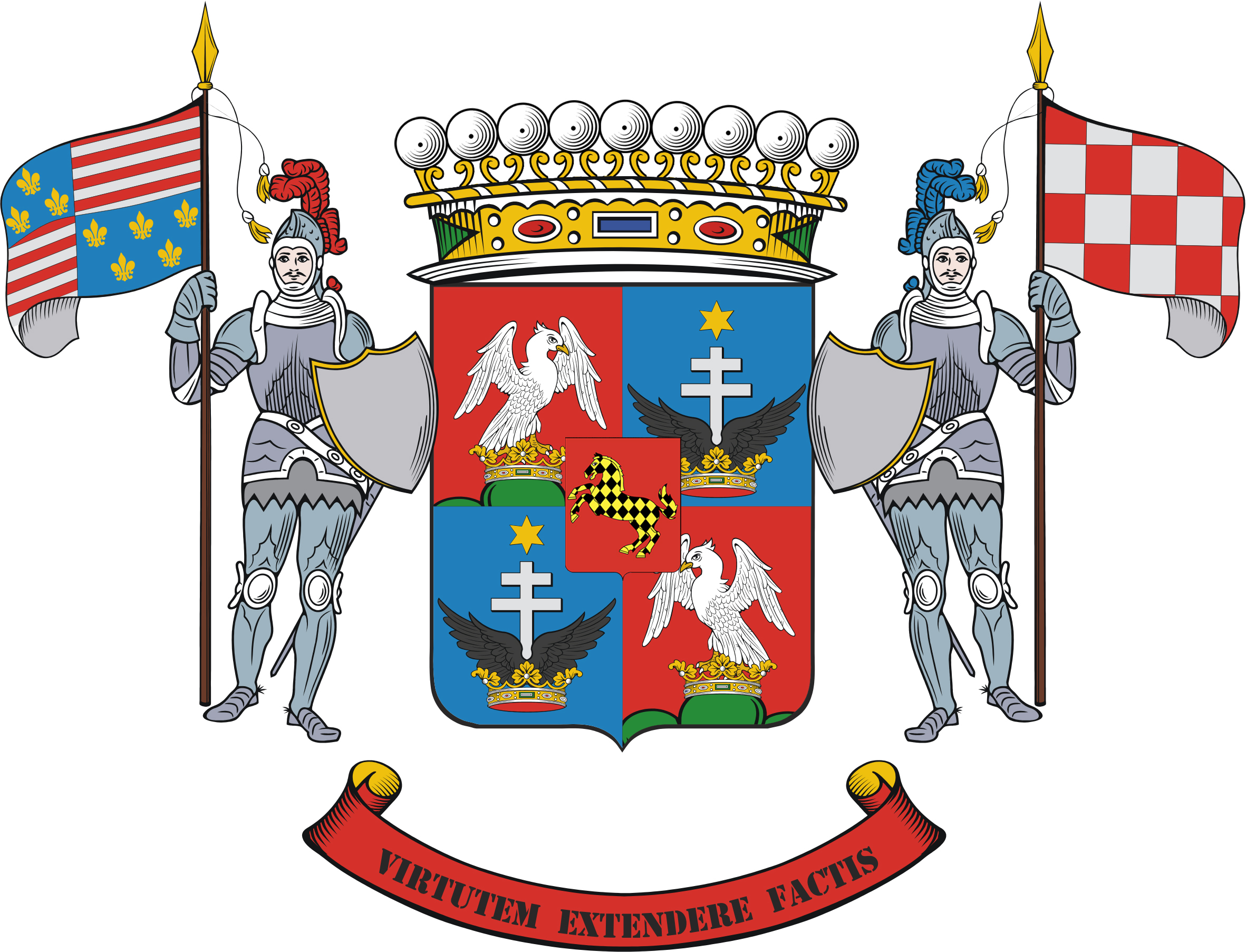
The coat of arms of the Cseszneky de Milvány et Cseszneg family.

Vitéz Count Gyula István Cseszneky de Milvány et Csesznek (Hungarian: vitéz cseszneki és milványi gróf Cseszneky Gyula István; 28 June 1914 – after 1970) was a Hungarian aristocrat, poet, cavalry officer who took part in the Hungarian reannexation of Northern Transylvania, and served as aide-de-camp to King Tomislav II of Croatia. He was also involved in anti-Nazi conspiracies and played an important role in the rescue of the European Jews.

== Early life ==
Gyula Cseszneky's father was an inventor and impoverished aristocrat, a member of the House of Cseszneky, while his mother was the only daughter and heir of a wealthy grain merchant with extended commercial links throughout Austria-Hungary and the Balkans. After World War I, most of their properties were confiscated by the Serbian government, and then his father's sudden death even worsened their hardships.

Their financial difficulties notwithstanding, Gyula excelled at school, and showed a great interest in literature and poetry. His family encouraged him to become a Roman Catholic priest, however, he shortly changed his mind and as a holder of the Boncompagni family's grant he went to Italy to a military school. In Italy he was introduced to the cultural élite and high society by an old family friend and senator of the Kingdom of Italy, Count Enrico San Martino di Valperga. Fascinated by the Italian language and culture, the young Hungarian cadet translated into his native language several poems of Gabriele D'Annunzio. Cseszneky admired the Italian poet, and probably his subsequent adventure in the Balkans was inspired by D'Annunzio's Regency of Carnaro in Fiume.

== World War II ==
=== Northern Transylvania ===
In 1940 after the Second Vienna Award as a Hungarian reserve officer, he took part in the occupation and reintegration of Northern Transylvania. For his braveness showed during the marching, Miklós Horthy, Regent of the Kingdom of Hungary bestowed upon him the title Vitéz and awarded him the Commemorative Medal for the Liberation of Transylvania and the Medal For Bravery.

=== Aide-de-camp to the King of Croatia ===
In 1941 after the collapse of Yugoslavia, the Independent State of Croatia was established and following negotiations between Italy and the representatives of the new state, Italian King Victor Emmanuel III's nephew Aimone, Duke of Spoleto was elected King of Croatia under the regnal name Tomislav II. Gyula Cseszneky who spoke fluent Croatian, Italian, German and Hungarian, and had also met Prince Aimone during his years in Rome, was appointed aide-de-camp and privy counsellor to the new monarch. Nevertheless, since the King did not actually occupy his throne in Zagreb, Count Cseszneky, whose titles of nobility had just been confirmed, deeply disappointed by the brutality of the Ustasha regime, left the service.

=== Principality of the Pindus and Voivodeship of Macedonia ===
In August 1943, due to his influential Italian friends and relatives in the Balkans, Count Gyula Cseszneky was proclaimed formally a ruler of the already dissolved collaborationist Principality of the Pindus. He only held the title nominally for a very short, and in his name governed only the local pro-Bulgarian autonomists during August-September 1943. In fact, they offered him the title "Vojvode of Macedonia".

=== Against National Socialism ===
Count Gyula István Cseszneky de Milvány et Csesznek was a conservative monarchist with strong anti-communist persuasion, however, he always despised Nazism and antisemitism. One of his sisters was married to a Hungarian Jew who later became a victim of the Holocaust.

Cseszneky also reportedly saved the life of several Jews in Croatia and Hungary. After the war his merits were recognized in Israel.

Count Cseszneky was aware of King Tomislav's secret plan to make a separate peace agreement with the Allied Forces, and he hoped that opening a route for an Allied intervention in the Balkans, while saving them from the Red Army. Having this in mind, the Count also served as a contact person between Miklós Kállay's Hungarian government and the participants of the Lorković-Vokić coup in Croatia. After Regent Horthy's failed attempt to change side in the war, he was searched for by the Gestapo.

== Post-war life ==
The end of the war saw him in Budapest. In spite of his anti-Nazi credentials, in Soviet Union-occupied Hungary, Gyula Cseszneky was declared enemy of the working class and was forced into exile. He went with King Tomislav II - then Aimone, Duke of Aosta - to Argentina and later died in Brazil.
