= Bezi =

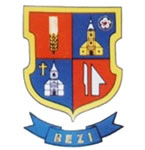
- Coat of arms

- Location of Győr-Moson-Sopron county in Hungary

- Location of Bezi
- Coordinates: 47.67492°N 17.39305°E
- Country: Hungary
- County: Győr-Moson-Sopron

Area
  - Total: 11.2 km^{2} (4.3 sq mi)

Population (2004)
  - Total: 438
  - Density: 39.1/km^{2} (101/sq mi)
- Time zone: UTC+1 (CET)
  - Summer (DST): UTC+2 (CEST)
- Postal code: 9162
- Area code: 96
- Motorways: M85
- Distance from Budapest: 143 km (89 mi) East

Bezi is a village in Győr-Moson-Sopron county, Hungary.

== History ==
The village was founded by Pechenegs. Its first lords were the Bezys, but since the 16th century the Márffy, Cseszneky and Poki families had here noble estates. In the 17th century Péter Pázmány was the most important possessor.

== Education ==
Lébény Elementary School and Elementary Art School are located in Bezi.
