= Rábapatona =

- Flag Coat of arms

- Location of Rábapatona
- Coordinates: 47.6333°N 17.4833°E
- Country: Hungary
- County: Győr-Moson-Sopron

Government
  - Mayor: Molnár-Nagy Béla Zoltán (Ind.)

Area
  - Total: 39.74 km^{2} (15.34 sq mi)

Population (2022)
  - Total: 2,770
  - Density: 69.7/km^{2} (181/sq mi)
- Time zone: UTC+1 (CET)
  - Summer (DST): UTC+2 (CEST)
- Postal code: 9142
- Area code: 96
- Motorways: M85
- Distance from Budapest: 140 km (87 mi) East

Rábapatona is a village in Győr-Moson-Sopron County, Hungary.
