= Abda, Hungary =

Abda
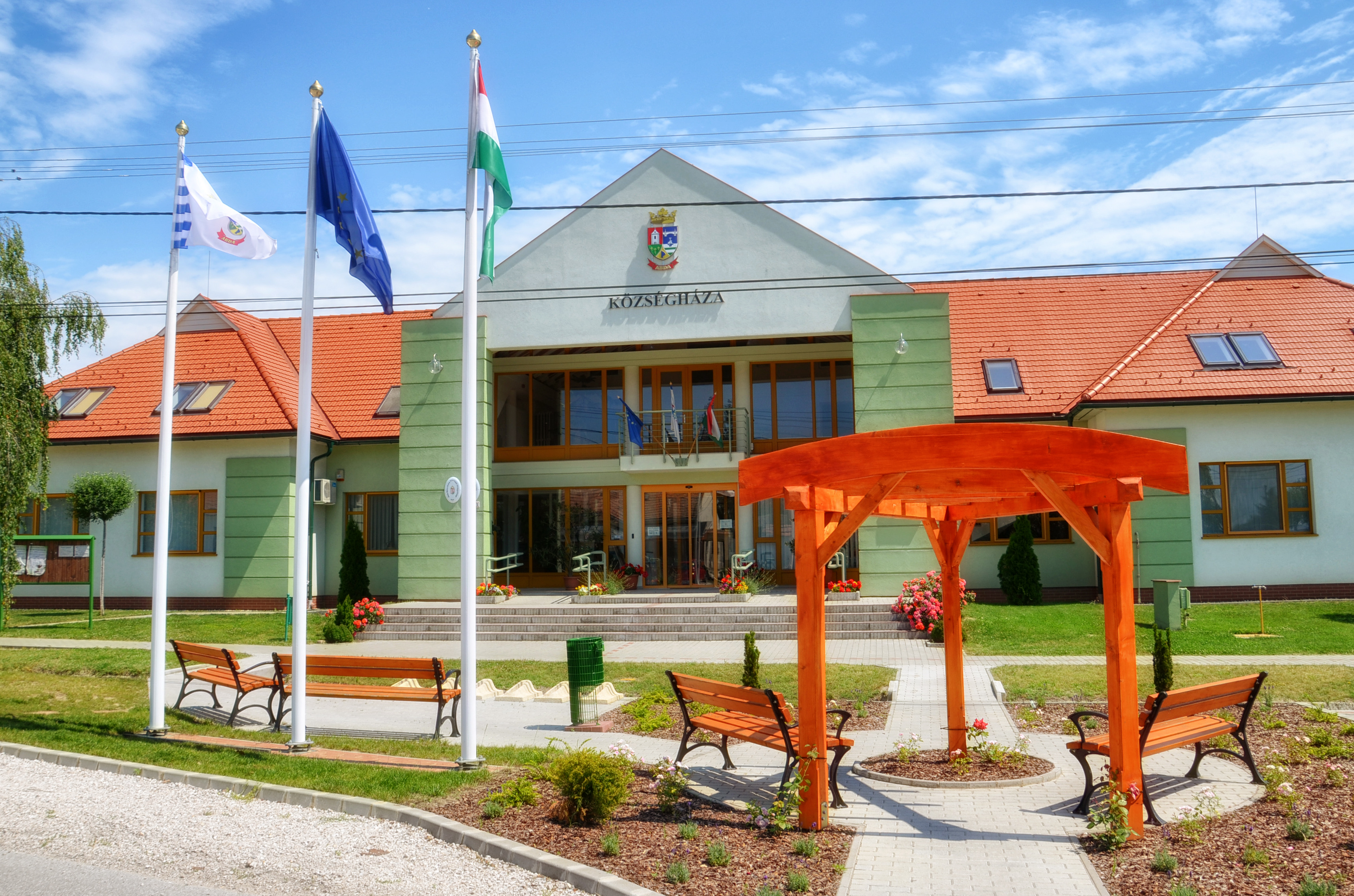
- Village hall

- Flag Coat of arms

- Location of Győr-Moson-Sopron county in Hungary

- Location of Abda, Hungary
- Coordinates: 47.69511°N 17.54194°E
- Country: Hungary
- County: Győr-Moson-Sopron

Government
  - Mayor: Zsolt Szabó

Area
  - Total: 19.02 km^{2} (7.34 sq mi)

Population (2008)
  - Total: 3,126
  - Density: 164.19/km^{2} (425.3/sq mi)
- Time zone: UTC+1 (CET)
  - Summer (DST): UTC+2 (CEST)
- Postal code: 9151
- Area code: 96
- Motorways: M1, M85
- Distance from Budapest: 134 km (83 mi) East

Abda is a village in Győr-Moson-Sopron county, Hungary.

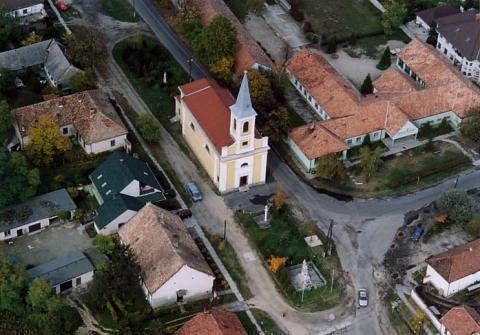
Aerial photography of the St. Joseph's Church of Abda

== Etymology ==
The name comes from Slavic languages *ob(v)oda — literally "a place around which water flows". See i.e. similar Slavic names Obod, Obodnik, Obodnica (Serbo-Croatian language area) or Obodno (Poland).
