= János Patály =

Hungarian footballer

Personal information
- Full name: János Patály
- Date of birth: 29 February 1988 (age 38)
- Place of birth: Mátészalka, Hungary
- Position: Right back

Team information
- Current team: Nyíregyháza
- Number: 11

Youth career
- 2002–2006: Nyíregyháza

Senior career*
Years	Team	Apps	(Gls)
2006–2008	Mátészalka	53	(2)
2008–2013	Nagyecsed	113	(10)
2013–	Nyíregyháza	9	(0)
- * Club domestic league appearances and goals as of 3 August 2014

János Patály (born 29 February 1988) is a Hungarian football player who currently plays for Nyíregyháza Spartacus FC.

== Career statistics ==
Appearances and goals by club, season and competition
Club	Season	League		Cup		League Cup		Europe		Total	
Club	Season	Apps	Goals	Apps	Goals	Apps	Goals	Apps	Goals	Apps	Goals
Mátészalka
Mátészalka	2006–07	24	1	0	0	0	0	0	0	24	1
Mátészalka	2006–07	29	1	0	0	0	0	0	0	29	1
Mátészalka	Total	53	2	0	0	0	0	0	0	53	2
Nagyecsed
Nagyecsed	2008–09	25	0	1	0	0	0	0	0	26	0
Nagyecsed	2009–10	23	3	0	0	0	0	0	0	23	3
Nagyecsed	2010–11	28	2	4	2	0	0	0	0	32	4
Nagyecsed	2011–12	24	4	0	0	0	0	0	0	24	4
Nagyecsed	2012–13	13	1	0	0	0	0	0	0	13	1
Nagyecsed	Total	113	10	5	2	0	0	0	0	118	12
Nyíregyháza
Nyíregyháza	2012–13	5	0	0	0	0	0	0	0	5	0
Nyíregyháza	2013–14	3	0	4	0	6	1	0	0	13	1
Nyíregyháza	2014–15	1	0	2	1	5	0	0	0	8	1
Nyíregyháza	Total	9	0	6	1	11	1	0	0	26	2
Career total		175	12	11	3	11	1	0	0	197	16

Updated to games played as of 18 November 2014.
