= Ikrény =

- Flag Coat of arms

- Location of Győr-Moson-Sopron county in Hungary

- Location of Győr-Sashegy
- Coordinates: 47.65301°N 17.52759°E
- Country: Hungary
- County: Győr-Moson-Sopron

Area
  - Total: 15.58 km^{2} (6.02 sq mi)

Population (2004)
  - Total: 1,676
  - Density: 107.57/km^{2} (278.6/sq mi)
- Time zone: UTC+1 (CET)
  - Summer (DST): UTC+2 (CEST)
- Postal code: 9141
- Area code: 96
- Motorways: M1, M85
- Distance from Budapest: 131 km (81 mi) East

Ikrény is a village in Győr-Moson-Sopron county, Hungary.

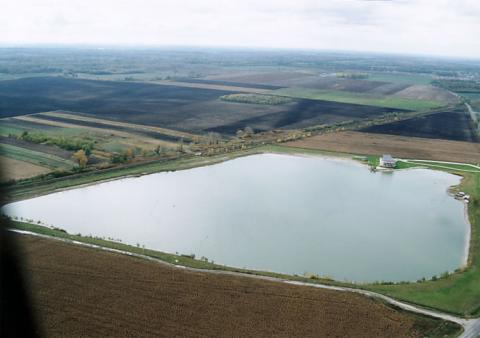
