= Kisbajcs =

- Flag Coat of arms

- Location of Győr-Moson-Sopron county in Hungary

- Location of Kisbajcs
- Coordinates: 47.74476°N 17.67975°E
- Country: Hungary
- County: Győr-Moson-Sopron

Area
  - Total: 8.74 km^{2} (3.37 sq mi)

Population (2004)
  - Total: 788
  - Density: 90.16/km^{2} (233.5/sq mi)
- Time zone: UTC+1 (CET)
  - Summer (DST): UTC+2 (CEST)
- Postal code: 9062
- Area code: 96

Kisbajcs is a village in Győr-Moson-Sopron county, Hungary.
