= Győrsövényház =

Győrsövényház Plankenhausen
- Flag Coat of arms

- Location of Győr-Moson-Sopron county in Hungary

- Location of Győrsövényház
- Coordinates: 47.69202°N 17.37391°E
- Country: Hungary
- County: Győr-Moson-Sopron

Area
  - Total: 24.21 km^{2} (9.35 sq mi)

Population (2025)
  - Total: 783
  - Density: 32.38/km^{2} (83.9/sq mi)
- Time zone: UTC+1 (CET)
  - Summer (DST): UTC+2 (CEST)
- Postal code: 9161
- Area code: 96

Győrsövényház (German: Plankenhausen) is a village in Győr-Moson-Sopron county, Hungary. As of 2025, the population is 783.

== Demographics ==
As of 2022, 96% of the population is Hungarian, and 10.9% is German. 49.9% of the population is Roman Catholic, 5.8% is Lutheran, 11.3% are atheist, and 3.7% are another Christian denomination.
