= Cseszneky (surname) =

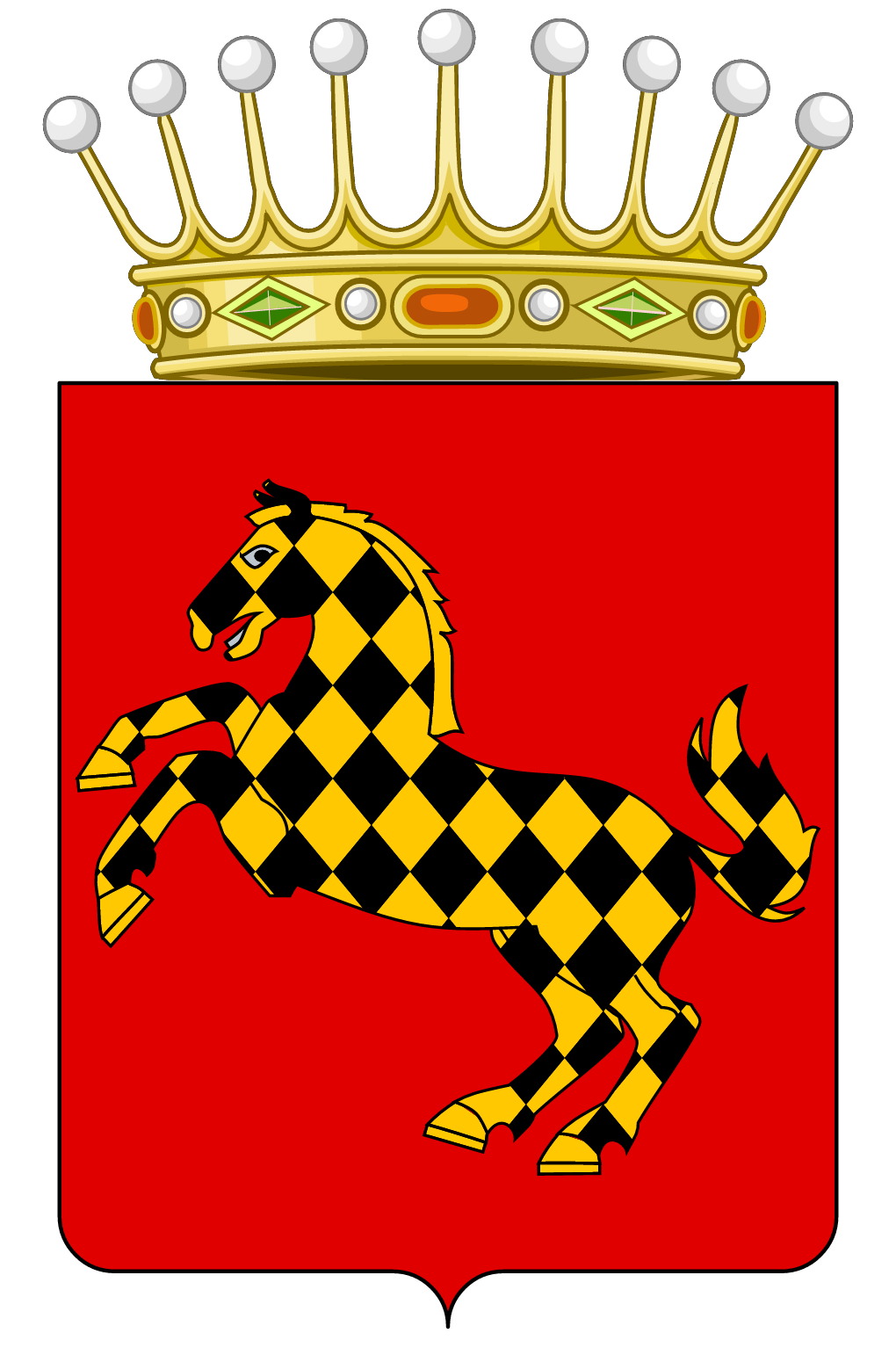
Gules, a horse forcené lozengy or and sable, is the lesser comital coat of arms of members of the House of Cseszneky, an ancient Hungarian noble family

Cseszneky is a surname of Hungarian origin.

== Notable people ==
- Benedek Cseszneky, office holder, diplomat
- György Cseszneky, castellan of Tata and Győr
- Gyula Cseszneky (1914-ca 1970) poet, translator, Macedonian Voivode
- Imre Cseszneky, agriculturalist, horse breeder
- Jakab Cseszneky, royal swordbearer, lord of Trencsén Castle, builder of Csesznek Castle
- János Cseszneky, infantry commander, castellan of Győr
- Mátyás Cseszneky, cavalry commander
- Mihály Cseszneky, vice-castellan of Várpalota
- Mihály Cseszneky de Milvány (1910–1975), industrialist

== See also ==
- Csesznek
