= 2008–09 Kecskeméti TE season =

Kecskemét
2008–09 season
- Manager: Tomislav Sivić
- Stadium: Széktói Stadion
- Nemzeti Bajnokság I: 5th
- Magyar Kupa: Quarter-finals
- Ligakupa: Group stage
- Top goalscorer: League: Csaba Csordás (14); All: Csaba Csordás; Tibor Montvai (16 each)
- Average home league attendance: 3,686
Home colours	Away colours

The 2008–09 season was Kecskeméti Torna Egylet's 96th competitive season, 1st consecutive season in the Nemzeti Bajnokság I and 97th year in existence as a football club. In addition to the domestic league, Kecskemét participated in this season's editions of the Magyar Kupa and Ligakupa.

== First team squad ==
Note: Flags indicate national team as defined under FIFA eligibility rules; some limited exceptions apply. Players may hold more than one non-FIFA nationality.

No.	Pos.	Nation	Player
1	GK	HUN	Zoltán Tóth
2	DF	HUN	Balázs Koszó
4	DF	SRB	Goran Grkinić
5	DF	HUN	István Farkas
6	MF	HUN	Gergely Rusvay
7	FW	HUN	Tibor Montvai
8	MF	HUN	Zsolt Koncz
9	FW	HUN	József Balázs
10	MF	MNE	Vladan Savić
11	FW	HUN	Csaba Csordás
12	MF	HUN	Norbert Némedi
14	MF	SRB	Vladan Čukić
15	DF	HUN	Attila Gyagya

No.	Pos.	Nation	Player
16	DF	HUN	Sándor Nagy
17	MF	SRB	Aleksandar Alempijević
18	MF	CGO	Francis Litsingi
19	FW	HUN	László Kormos
20	MF	HUN	Attila Menyhárt
21	DF	CRO	Ivan Lovrić
22	DF	HUN	István Bagi
23	FW	HUN	Ádám Hegedűs
25	GK	MNE	Pavle Velimirović
27	MF	CMR	Yannick Mbengono
30	GK	BIH	Romeo Mitrović
36	DF	HUN	Szabolcs Schindler
88	DF	HUN	József Nagy

== Competitions ==
=== Overview ===
Competition	First match	Last match	Starting round	Final position	Record							
Competition	First match	Last match	Starting round	Final position	Pld	W	D	L	GF	GA	GD	Win %
Nemzeti Bajnokság I	28 July 2008	30 May 2009	Matchday 1	5th	30	14	6	10	55	44	+11	46.67
Magyar Kupa	3 September 2008	18 March 2009	Third round	Quarter-finals	6	2	2	2	11	10	+1	33.33
Ligakupa	1 October 2008	14 February 2009	Group stage	Group stage	10	3	2	5	22	17	+5	30.00
Total					46	19	10	17	88	71	+17	41.30

Source: Competitions

=== Nemzeti Bajnokság I ===
==== League table ====
Pos	Team	Pld	W	D	L	GF	GA	GD	Pts	Qualification or relegation
3	Haladás	30	16	5	9	44	29	+15	53	Qualification for Europa League first qualifying round
4	Zalaegerszeg	30	15	7	8	52	44	+8	52	
5	Kecskemét	30	14	6	10	55	44	+11	48	
6	Fehérvár	30	14	6	10	42	34	+8	48	
7	MTK Budapest	30	13	6	11	43	41	+2	45	

Source: soccerway.com
Rules for classification: 1st points; 2nd overall wins; 3rd goal difference; 4th goals scored

==== Results summary ====
Overall								Home						Away					
Pld	W	D	L	GF	GA	GD	Pts	W	D	L	GF	GA	GD	W	D	L	GF	GA	GD
30	14	6	10	55	44	+11	48	10	3	2	33	16	+17	4	3	8	22	28	−6

Source: HFF

==== Results by round ====
Round	1	2	3	4	5	6	7	8	9	10	11	12	13	14	15	16	17	18	19	20	21	22	23	24	25	26	27	28	29	30
Ground	H	A	H	A	H	A	H	A	H	H	A	H	A	H	A	A	H	A	H	A	H	A	H	A	A	H	A	H	A	H
Result	L	L	W	W	D	L	W	L	W	W	W	L	D	D	L	D	W	L	W	D	D	L	W	L	W	W	L	W	W	W
Position	11	15	12	8	8	11	6	9	8	6	5	5	6	7	8	8	5	8	7	7	7	8	6	9	8	6	7	5	5	5

Source: Matches
A = Away; H = Home; W = Win; D = Draw; L = Loss

==== Matches ====
28 July 2008 1	Kecskemét	1–2	Paks	Kecskemét
20:00 CET (UTC+1)	Csordás 16' (pen.); Koszó (yellow card) 37'; Čukić (yellow card) 40'	Report	Tököli 3', 90'; Kriston (yellow card) 4'; Báló (yellow card) 31'	Stadium: Széktói Stadion; Attendance: 4,500; Referee: Péter Solymosi

2 August 2008 2	Zalaegerszeg	1–0	Kecskemét	Zalaegerszeg
20:00 CEST (UTC+2)	Zsömlye (yellow card) 32'; Méyé 40'; Sluka (red card) 85'	Report	Koszó (red card) 38'; Grkinić (yellow card) 47'; Savić (red card) 55'	Stadium: ZTE Arena; Attendance: 3,000; Referee: Krisztián Király

16 August 2008 4	Fehérvár	1–2	Kecskemét	Székesfehérvár
20:00 CEST (UTC+2)	G. Horváth II (yellow card) 18', (goal) 64'; Anđić (yellow card) 56'; Sitku (yellow card) 76'; Mohl (yellow card) 87'	Report	Menyhárt 13'; Csordás 49'; Mbengono (red card) 65'; Čukić (yellow card) 88'; Mitrović (yellow card) 90+4'	Stadium: Sóstói Stadion; Attendance: 1,548; Referee: Ferenc Bede

23 August 2008 5	Kecskemét	1–1	Nyíregyháza	Kecskemét
20:00 CEST (UTC+2)	Savić (yellow card) 44'; Schindler (yellow card) 60'; Alempijević (yellow card) 78'; Litsingi 90+2'	Report	Goia (yellow card) 28'; Apostu 49', (yellow card) 72'; Cornaci (red card) 74'; Dosso (yellow card) 76'; Zabos (yellow card) 82'; Ramos (yellow card) 90+3'	Stadium: Széktói Stadion; Attendance: 4,000; Referee: Tamás Bognár

30 August 2008 6	Újpest	4–3	Kecskemét	Budapest
15:00 CEST (UTC+2)	Ćutuk 7'; Božić 20', (yellow card) 75'; Mijadinoski (yellow card) 21'; G. Sándor (yellow card) 57'; Kabát 73', 88', (yellow card) 89'; Széki (yellow card) 90+1'	Report	Grkinić (yellow card) 61'; Litsingi 68'; Csordás 70', 80' (pen.); Čukić (yellow card) 83'; Mitrović (yellow card) 84'	Stadium: Ferenc Szusza Stadium; Attendance: 5,212; Referee: Viktor Kassai

7 September 2008 3	Kecskemét	1–0	Győr	Kecskemét
18:00 CEST (UTC+2)	Alempijević (yellow card) 45'; Mbengono 83'	Report	Tokody (yellow card) 68'; Böőr (yellow card) 81'	Stadium: Széktói Stadion; Attendance: 3,600; Referee: István Mészáros
Note: The match was postponed from the weekend of 8-10 August 2008, due to Győr's team being diagnosed with viral infections.

13 September 2008 7	Kecskemét	3–0	Siófok	Kecskemét
20:00 CEST (UTC+2)	Savić 1'; Montvai 51', 78', (yellow card) 51'	Report	Köntös (yellow card) 28'; Magasföldi (yellow card) 50'; Habi (yellow card) 62'; Lipcsei (yellow card) 64'; G. Hegedűs (yellow card) 76'; Fülöp (yellow card) 80'	Stadium: Széktói Stadion; Attendance: 3,500; Referee: Zsolt Szabó

20 September 2008 8	Haladás	3–1	Kecskemét	Szombathely
19:00 CEST (UTC+2)	Rajos 15'; Guzmics (yellow card) 29'; P. Tóth 35', (yellow card) 56'; Kenesei 61'	Report	Farkas (yellow card) 43'; Koncz 68'; Menyhárt (yellow card) 79'	Stadium: Rohonci Street Stadium; Attendance: 5,000; Referee: Gergely Sulyok

26 September 2008 9	Kecskemét	3–0	Debrecen	Kecskemét
19:00 CEST (UTC+2)	Koncz (yellow card) 1'; Schindler (yellow card) 9'; Montvai 15'; Mbengono 44'; Csordás 68'	Report	Leandro (yellow card) 52'; Komlósi (yellow card) 57'	Stadium: Széktói Stadion; Attendance: 4,000; Referee: Sándor Andó-Szabó

4 October 2008 10	Kecskemét	2–0	Vasas	Kecskemét
18:00 CEST (UTC+2)	Farkas 15'; Čukić 39'; Montvai (yellow card) 75'	Report	Z. Balog (yellow card) 51'; Paripović (yellow card) 75'	Stadium: Széktói Stadion; Attendance: 4,000; Referee: Mihály Fábián

18 October 2008 11	Rákospalota	0–1	Kecskemét	Budapest
18:00 CEST (UTC+2)	Kapcsos (yellow card) 21'; Lisztes (yellow card) 79'	Report	I. Farkas (yellow card) 11'; Alempijević (yellow card) 30'; Á. Hegedűs 64'	Stadium: Stadion Budai II. Laszló; Attendance: 1,500; Referee: Tamás Bognár

25 October 2008 12	Kecskemét	3–4	Kaposvár	Kecskemét
18:00 CEST (UTC+2)	Csordás 5'; Schindler (red card) 17'; Montvai (yellow card) 31', (goal) 31'; Alempijević 65'; Čukić (yellow card) 84'	Report	Nikolić 29', 62'; Zahorecz (yellow card) 43'; Obrić 46'; Božović 71'; Gujić (yellow card) 75'; Pest (yellow card) 84'	Stadium: Széktói Stadion; Attendance: 3,500; Referee: Viktor Kassai

1 November 2008 13	Honvéd	2–2	Kecskemét	Budapest
18:00 CET (UTC+1)	Rigonato 48'; Vincze (yellow card) 54'; Hercegfalvi 60'; Genito (yellow card) 61'; Filó (yellow card) 87'	Report	Koszó (yellow card) 3'; Csordás 32', 90+2'; Farkas (yellow card) 38'; Gyagya (yellow card) 87'	Stadium: Bozsik Stadion; Attendance: 1,200; Referee: Zsolt Szabó

8 November 2008 14	Kecskemét	0–0	MTK	Kecskemét
15:00 CET (UTC+1)	Gyagya (yellow card) 26'; Mitrović (yellow card) 36'; Čukić (red card) 68'	Report	Zsidai (yellow card) 68'	Stadium: Széktói Stadion; Attendance: 4,500; Referee: Roland Veizer

15 November 2008 15	Diósgyőr	1–0	Kecskemét	Miskolc
18:00 CET (UTC+1)	Miličić 8', (yellow card) 16'; Sebők (yellow card) 51'	Report	Bagi (yellow card) 60'	Stadium: Diósgyőri Stadion; Attendance: 5,000; Referee: Tamás Arany

21 February 2009 16	Paks	2–2	Kecskemét	Paks
17:00 CET (UTC+1)	Tököli 38'; Sipeki (yellow card) 60'; Böde (yellow card) 79'; Horváth (yellow card) 82'; Báló 86', (yellow card) 86'	Report	Mbengono 39'; Csordás 42' (pen.); Gyagya (red card) 47'; Z. Tóth (yellow card) 90+2'	Stadium: Fehérvári úti Stadion; Attendance: 1,000; Referee: Sándor Andó-Szabó

8 March 2009 18	Győr	2–0	Kecskemét	Győr
17:30 CET (UTC+1)	Kink 15'; Stark (yellow card) 31', (goal) 77' (pen.); Stanišić (yellow card) 75'	Report	Alempijević (yellow card) 53'; Čukić (red card) 76'	Stadium: ETO Park; Attendance: 2,000; Referee: István Mészáros

14 March 2009 19	Kecskemét	2–1	Fehérvár	Kecskemét
18:00 CET (UTC+1)	Kormos 22', 35'; Montvai (yellow card) 75'; Alempijević (yellow card) 90+1'	Report	Radović (yellow card) 44'; D. Szakály (yellow card) 58'; Vujović (yellow card) 59', (goal) 90+2'; Sifter (yellow card) 76'	Stadium: Széktói Stadion; Attendance: 2,200; Referee: Mihály Fábián

21 March 2009 20	Nyíregyháza	3–3	Kecskemét	Nyíregyháza
18:00 CET (UTC+1)	Imedashvili 7', (yellow card) 47'; Apostu 11'; Minczér (yellow card) 40'; Odrobéna (red card) 47'; Miskolczi (yellow card) 83', (goal) 88'	Report	Montvai 22', 90+2', (yellow card) 79'; Némedi (yellow card) 36'; Gyagya (yellow card) 38'; Mbengono 48'; Schindler (yellow card) 87'	Stadium: Városi Stadion; Attendance: 2,000; Referee: Zsolt Szabó

4 April 2009 21	Kecskemét	2–2	Újpest	Kecskemét
15:00 CEST (UTC+2)	Gyagya 8'; Csordás 49'	Report	Rajczi 33'; Bori (yellow card) 62'; Dudić (yellow card) 62'; Korcsmár 67'; Mijadinoski (yellow card) 71'	Stadium: Széktói Stadion; Attendance: 7,000; Referee: Sándor Andó-Szabó

11 April 2009 22	Siófok	2–0	Kecskemét	Siófok
19:00 CEST (UTC+2)	Magasföldi (yellow card) 23'; Kogler 42'; G. Horváth I (yellow card) 55'; Ribeiro 79'	Report	Farkas (yellow card) 62'; Gyagya (red card) 66'; Némedi (yellow card) 68'	Stadium: Révész Street Stadium; Attendance: 1,000; Referee: Roland Veizer

18 April 2009 23	Kecskemét	3–2	Haladás	Kecskemét
20:00 CEST (UTC+2)	Csordás 39' (pen.), 77'; Čukić (yellow card) 75'; Némedi 81'	Report	Mitrović 13' (o.g.); Oross 72'	Stadium: Széktói Stadion; Attendance: 2,000; Referee: Tamás Arany

25 April 2009 24	Debrecen	3–1	Kecskemét	Debrecen
15:00 CEST (UTC+2)	Oláh 22'; Dombi (yellow card) 62', (goal) 86'; Leandro 73'	Report	Litsingi (yellow card) 29', (goal) 36'; Mitrović (red card) 33'; Velimirović (yellow card) 71'; Koncz (yellow card) 86'	Stadium: Stadion Oláh Gábor Út; Attendance: 4,000; Referee: István Vad

28 April 2009 25	Vasas	1–2	Kecskemét	Budapest
19:00 CEST (UTC+2)	B. Tóth (yellow card) 35'; Sowunmi 50'; Villám (yellow card) 74'; Vujović (yellow card) 82'	Report	Čukić 23', (yellow card) 85'; Mbengono 41'; Némedi (yellow card) 79'	Stadium: Stadion Rudolf Illovszky; Attendance: 600; Referee: Ferenc Bede

1 May 2009 26	Kecskemét	5–3	Rákospalota	Kecskemét
19:00 CEST (UTC+2)	Mbengono 12'; Csordás 36'; Litsingi 50'; Montvai 57', 84'; Koncz (yellow card) 62'	Report	Z. Varga 14', (red card) 69'; Torma 30', 40'; B. Kovács (yellow card) 35'; Jeremiás (yellow card) 56'; Kapcsos (red card) 75'; Sallai (yellow card) 80'	Stadium: Széktói Stadion; Attendance: 2,000; Referee: János Takács

6 May 2009 17	Kecskemét	2–0	Zalaegerszeg	Kecskemét
19:00 CEST (UTC+2)	Litsingi 16', 45'; Némedi (yellow card) 63'; Farkas (yellow card) 73'; Schindler (yellow card) 85'	Report	Kocsárdi (yellow card) 54'; Waltner (yellow card) 62'	Stadium: Széktói Stadion; Attendance: 2,500; Referee: Viktor Kassai
Note: The matches of the 17th round were postponed due to HFF decision.

9 May 2009 27	Kaposvár	2–1	Kecskemét	Kaposvár
19:00 CEST (UTC+2)	Petrók (yellow card) 30', (goal) 32'; Zsolnai 89'	Report	Némedi 22' (pen.); Ristić (yellow card) 37'	Stadium: Stadion Rákóczi; Attendance: 2,000; Referee: Szabolcs Szilasi

16 May 2009 28	Kecskemét	3–1	Honvéd	Kecskemét
19:00 CEST (UTC+2)	Farkas (yellow card) 29'; Litsingi 58'; Gyagya (yellow card) 64'; Montvai 65', 90+2', (yellow card) 90+2'	Report	Guié 26'; Genito (yellow card) 37'; Lungu (yellow card) 42'; Debreceni (yellow card) 57'	Stadium: Széktói Stadion; Attendance: 4,500; Referee: Tamás Bognár

23 May 2009 29	MTK	1–4	Kecskemét	Budapest
19:00 CEST (UTC+2)	Zsidai (yellow card) 50'; Lambulić (yellow card) 54'; G. Nagy (yellow card) 61'; Lencse (yellow card) 65'; Pátkai 76'	Report	Csordás 25'; Farkas 29'; Savić 43'; Montvai 55'	Stadium: Hidegkuti Nándor Stadion; Attendance: 600; Referee: Ádám Németh

30 May 2009 30	Kecskemét	2–0	Diósgyőr	Kecskemét
19:00 CEST (UTC+2)	Litsingi 43'; Schindler (yellow card) 71'; Mbengono 80' (pen.)	Report	Kállai (yellow card) 24'; Kamber (yellow card) 43'; Bogunović (red card) 58'	Stadium: Széktói Stadion; Attendance: 3,500; Referee: Ádám Farkas

=== Magyar Kupa ===
3 September 2008 Third round	Jászberény	1–3	Kecskemét	Jászberény
15:30 CEST (UTC+2)	Vaszicsku 77'	Report	Menyhárt 32'; Mbengono 73'; Montvai 89'	Stadium: Városi Stadion; Referee: János Takács

23 September 2008 Round of 32	ESMTK	0–4	Kecskemét	Budapest
15:30 CEST (UTC+2)	Füzi (yellow card) 67'	Report	Alempijević 38'; Rusvay 43'; J. Nagy (yellow card) 51'; Némedi 63'; Mbengono 90'	Stadium: Ady Endre utca Referee: Krisztián Pénczél

==== Round of 16 ====
8 October 2008 First leg	Kecskemét	1–1	Rákospalota	Kecskemét
17:00 CEST (UTC+2)	Csordás 28'; Čukić (yellow card) 83'	Report	B. Kovács (yellow card) 36'; Erős (yellow card) 56'; Jeremiás (yellow card) 66'; Kapcsos 83'	Stadium: Széktói Stadion; Referee: István Vad

22 October 2008 Second leg	Rákospalota	2–2 (a.e.t.) (3–3 (a) agg.)	Kecskemét	Budapest
14:00 CEST (UTC+2)	Erős (yellow card) 26'; Pomper (yellow card) 39'; Torma 74'; Kapcsos (yellow card) 75'; Nyerges 115'	Report	Čukić (yellow card) 11'; Csordás 43'; Litsingi (yellow card) 68', (goal) 103'	Stadium: Stadion Budai II. Laszló; Referee: Szabolcs Szilasi
Note: 3–3 on aggregate. Kecskemét won on away goals.

==== Quarter-finals ====
11 March 2009 First leg	Honvéd	2–0	Kecskemét	Budapest
18:00 CET (UTC+1)	Moreira 36', 54'; Filó (yellow card) 83'; Angoua (yellow card) 87'	Report	Čukić (yellow card) 3'; Farkas (yellow card) 41'; Schindler (yellow card) 63'	Stadium: Bozsik Stadion; Attendance: 850; Referee: Zoltán Iványi

18 March 2009 Second leg	Kecskemét	1–4 (1–6 agg.)	Honvéd	Kecskemét
19:00 CET (UTC+1)	Montvai 16'; Kormos (yellow card) 23'; Koncz (yellow card) 44'; Némedi (yellow card) 51'; Čukić (yellow card) 58'	Report	Dieng 4', 44'; Takács (yellow card) 21'; Guié 33'; Filó (yellow card) 59'; Arsenijević 90+1'	Stadium: Széktói Stadion; Attendance: 1,000; Referee: István Vad
Note: Honvéd won 6–1 on aggregate.

=== Ligakupa ===
==== Group stage ====
Pos	Team	Pld	W	D	L	GF	GA	GD	Pts	Qualification	FEH	HON	FER	KEC	RAK	BAK
1	Fehérvár	10	7	3	0	29	9	+20	24	Advance to knockout phase	—	2–2	0–0	2–0	4–0	8–0
2	Honvéd	10	5	4	1	33	16	+17	19	Advance to knockout phase	1–1	—	2–2	5–3	8–1	5–1
3	Ferencváros	10	5	4	1	20	10	+10	19		2–3	2–2	—	2–1	3–0	3–0
4	Kecskemét	10	3	2	5	22	17	+5	11		2–3	2–3	0–0	—	2–2	4–0
5	Rákospalota	10	3	1	6	14	28	−14	10		2–4	1–0	2–3	0–3	—	4–1
6	Baktalórántháza	10	0	0	10	3	41	−38	0		0–2	1–5	0–3	0–5	0–2	—

Source: HFF

1 October 2008 1	Kecskemét	2–3	Honvéd	Kecskemét
	Balázs (yellow card) 8'; Savić 11'; Alempijević (yellow card) 18'; Menyhárt (yellow card) 36'; Kormos 69'; L. Sándor (red card) 80'	Report	Stojaković 10', (yellow card) 32'; Dobos 37'; Arsenijević 61'; Albarracín (red card) 75'; Fazakas (yellow card) 85'	Stadium: Széktói Stadion; Attendance: 600; Referee: Gábor Péter Kovács

15 October 2008 2	Rákospalota	0–3	Kecskemét	Budapest
		Report	Koszó (yellow card) 16'; Alempijević 58'; Disney 60'; S. Nagy 69'	Stadium: Stadion Budai II. Laszló; Attendance: 100; Referee: Ádám Farkas

29 October 2008 3	Kecskemét	4–0	Baktalórántháza	Kecskemét
	Némedi 32'; Litsingi 52'; Koskovits 78' (o.g.); Disney 90+1'	Report	Szabó (yellow card) 25'; Tolnai (yellow card) 31'	Stadium: Széktói Stadion; Attendance: 150; Referee: Ferenc Szöllősi

5 November 2008 4	Ferencváros	2–1	Kecskemét	Budapest
	Pisanjuk 13', (yellow card) 84'; Brettschneider 70'; Diaz (yellow card) 72'	Report	S. Nagy 3', (yellow card) 75'; Ábel (yellow card) 21'; Rusvay (yellow card) 80'	Stadium: Üllői úti stadion Attendance: 400; Referee: Mihály Fábián

12 November 2008 5	Kecskemét	2–3	Fehérvár	Kecskemét
	Vlahović (yellow card) 22'; Rusvay 66'; Pénzváltó (red card) 74'; Ábel 88'	Report	Ulvicki 15'; Denysov (yellow card) 42'; Lelkes 49'; D. Nagy 60'; Disztl (yellow card) 77'	Stadium: Széktói Stadion; Attendance: 100; Referee: Sándor Andó-Szabó

22 November 2008 6	Honvéd	5–3	Kecskemét	Budapest
	Stojaković 11'; Maróti (yellow card) 46'; Hercegfalvi 49', 68', 82'; Filó 84'	Report	Čukić (yellow card) 42'; Á. Hegedűs 57'; Kormos 65', 67'	Stadium: Bozsik Stadion; Attendance: 200; Referee: Tamás Bognár

29 November 2008 7	Kecskemét	2–2	Rákospalota	Kecskemét
13:00 CET (UTC+1)	Montvai 28'; Vlahović (yellow card) 58'; Kormos (yellow card) 79'; Menyhárt 84'	Report	Dancs 31', 58'; Pomper (yellow card) 60'; Kapcsos (yellow card) 68'; Sallai (red card) 77'	Stadium: Széktói Stadion; Attendance: 200; Referee: Zoltán Iványi

2 December 2008 8	Baktalórántháza	0–5	Kecskemét	Baktalórántháza
	Tolnai (yellow card) 48'	Report	Ábel (yellow card) 24'; Gyagya (yellow card) 34'; Menyhárt 42'; Montvai 44', 51'; L. Sándor 81'; S. Nagy 89'; Rusvay (yellow card) 90'	Stadium: Városi Stadion; Attendance: 100; Referee: Roland Veizer

8 February 2009 9	Kecskemét	0–0	Ferencváros	Kecskemét
	Mbengono (yellow card) 46'; Schindler (yellow card) 74'; Farkas (yellow card) 83'	Report	Lowton (yellow card) 46'; Kourouma (yellow card) 85'	Stadium: Széktói Stadion; Attendance: 1,300; Referee: Ferenc Bede

14 February 2009 10	Fehérvár	2–0	Kecskemét	Székesfehérvár
	D. Nagy 66'; Anđić (yellow card) 78'; Koller 81'	Report	Grkinić (yellow card) 22'; Farkas (yellow card) 36'; Koncz (yellow card) 67'	Stadium: Sóstói Stadion; Attendance: 100; Referee: Tamás Bognár

== Statistics ==
=== Overall ===
Appearances (Apps) numbers are for appearances in competitive games only, including sub appearances.
Source: Competitions

No.	Player	Pos.	Nemzeti Bajnokság I				Magyar Kupa				Ligakupa				Total			
No.	Player	Pos.	Apps	Goal	Yellow card	Red card	Apps	Goal	Yellow card	Red card	Apps	Goal	Yellow card	Red card	Apps	Goal	Yellow card	Red card
1	(Hungary) Zoltán Tóth	GK	3		1		6				4				13		1	
2	(Hungary) Balázs Koszó	DF	5		2	1	2				5		1		12		3	1
2	(Hungary) Lajos Bertus	MF	1								2				3			
3	(Serbia) Radojica Ristić	DF	1		1						1				2		1	
4	(Hungary) László Kiss										2				2			
4	(Serbia) Goran Grkinić	DF	11		2						2		1		13		3	
4	(Hungary) Bence Pénzváltó	DF									5			1	5			1
5	(Hungary) István Farkas	DF	28	2	6		3		1		5		2		36	2	9	
6	(Hungary) Gergely Rusvay	MF	2				2	1			8	1	2		12	2	2	
7	(Serbia) Nikola Jovanić										2				2			
7	(Hungary) Tibor Montvai	FW	26	11	6		6	2			5	3			37	16	6	
8	(Hungary) Zsolt Koncz	MF	21	1	3		4		1		2		1		27	1	5	
9	(Hungary) József Balázs	FW	5				2				5		1		12		1	
9	(Hungary) Marcell Balog	FW	5				1				3				9			
9	(Hungary) László Sándor	MF									3	1		1	3	1		1
10	(Montenegro) Vladan Savić	MF	26	2	1	1	5				6	1			37	3	1	1
11	(Hungary) Csaba Csordás	FW	30	14			4	2			4				38	16		
11	(Hungary) Gergő Máté	FW									2				2			
12	(Hungary) Norbert Némedi	MF	28	2	4		6	1	1		5	1			39	4	5	
14	(Croatia) Vinko Čikato										1				1			
14	(Serbia) Vladan Čukić	MF	25	2	6	2	4		4		3		1		32	2	11	2
14	(Hungary) Krisztián Szilágyi	MF									4				4			
15	(Hungary) Attila Gyagya	DF	19	1	4	2	5				6		1		30	1	5	2
16	(Hungary) Sándor Nagy	DF	2				3				5	3	1		10	3	1	
16	(Hungary) Adrián Nagy	MF	1								1				2			
16	(Hungary) Krisztián Kósa	MF									1				1			
17	(Hungary) Pál Urbán	DF									2				2			
17	(Serbia) Aleksandar Alempijević	MF	15	1	5		5	1			4	1	1		24	3	6	
17	(Montenegro) Bojan Vlahović	MF									3		2		3		2	
18	(Croatia) Zlatko Tomić	FW									1				1			
18	(Republic of the Congo) Francis Litsingi	MF	22	8	1		3	1	1		4	1			29	10	2	
19	(Hungary) Márk Pervanov																	
19	(Hungary) László Kormos	FW	9	2			2		1		5	3	1		16	5	2	
20	(Romania) Áron Vellai										1				1			
20	(Hungary) Attila Menyhárt	MF	15	1	1		4	1			8	2	1		27	4	2	
21	(Croatia) Ivan Lovrić	DF	5				1								6			
21	(Hungary) Zsolt Ábel	MF									6	1	2		6	1	2	
22	(Hungary) István Bagi	DF	13		1		1				6				20		1	
23	(Hungary) Ádám Hegedűs	FW	10	1			3				4	1			17	2		
25	(Montenegro) Pavle Velimirović	GK	3		1		1				4				8		1	
27	(Republic of the Congo) Armel Disney	FW									3	2			3	2		
27	(Cameroon) Yannick Mbengono	MF	28	7		1	6	2			1		1		35	9	1	1
29	(Hungary) József Rácz										1				1			
30	(Bosnia and Herzegovina) Romeo Mitrović	GK	26		3	1					3				29		3	1
32	(Montenegro) Vladan Peličić	DF	1												1			
36	(Hungary) Szabolcs Schindler	DF	27		5	1	4		1		3		1		34		7	1
88	(Hungary) József Nagy	DF					1		1		5				6		1	
88	(Hungary) Viktor Tölgyesi	MF	1												1			
Own goals												1				1		
Totals				55	53	9		11	11			22	20	2		88	84	11

=== Clean sheets ===
			Clean sheets			
No.	Player	Games Played	Nemzeti Bajnokság I	Magyar Kupa	Ligakupa	Total
30	(Bosnia and Herzegovina) Romeo Mitrović	29	9		1	10
1	(Hungary) Zoltán Tóth	13	0	1	3	4
25	(Montenegro) Pavle Velimirović	8	0	0	1	1
Totals			9	1	5	15
