= 2010–11 Kecskeméti TE season =

Kecskeméti TE – Ereco
2010–11 season
- Chairman: Pál Rózsa
- Manager: István Urbányi
- NB 1: 15.
- Hungarian Cup: 4. round
- Hungarian League Cup: Group stage

The 2010–11 season will be Kecskeméti TE's 3rd competitive season, 3rd consecutive season in the Nemzeti Bajnokság I and 99th year in existence as a football club.

== Team kit and logo ==
The team kits for the 2010–11 season are produced by Jako and the shirt sponsor is Ereco. The home kit is purple and white colour and the away kit is white colour.

Home	Away	Third

== Transfers ==
=== Summer ===
In: Note: Flags indicate national team as defined under FIFA eligibility rules; some limited exceptions apply. Players may hold more than one non-FIFA nationality.

No.	Pos.	Nation	Player
1	GK	HUN	Zoltán Tóth (loan return from (Hungary) Békéscsaba)
3	MF	HUN	Electo Wilson (from (Hungary) Újpest FC)
6	DF	HUN	Béla Balogh (from (Hungary) MTK Budapest FC)
17	MF	CMR	Christian Ebala (from (Hungary) Kazincbarcikai SC)
18	FW	CGO	Francis Litsingi (from (Hungary) Újpest FC)
19	FW	CIV	Sindou Dosso (from (Hungary) Nyíregyháza Spartacus)
20	FW	CTA	Foxi Kethevoama (from (Hungary) Újpest FC)
21	MF	HUN	Gábor Bori (from (Hungary) MTK Budapest FC)
28	GK	SVK	Ladislav Rybánsky (from (Slovakia) FC Spartak Trnava)
55	FW	HUN	Attila Tököli (from (Hungary) Paksi SE)
85	DF	HUN	Dávid Mohl (from (Hungary) Debreceni VSC)

Out: Note: Flags indicate national team as defined under FIFA eligibility rules; some limited exceptions apply. Players may hold more than one non-FIFA nationality.

No.	Pos.	Nation	Player
2	DF	HUN	Balázs Koszó (loan return to (Hungary) Szigetszentmiklósi TK)
3	DF	BRA	Robson de Souza (released)
4	DF	HUN	István Szűcs (loan return to (Hungary) Debreceni VSC)
6	DF	BIH	Dalio Memić (released)
7	FW	HUN	Tibor Montvai (to (Hungary) Paksi SE)
9	FW	NGA	MacPherlin Dudu Omagbemi (Free Agent)
9	FW	HUN	Attila Simon (on loan to (Hungary) Zalaegerszegi TE)
16	DF	SVN	Aleš Kokot (released)
20	MF	HUN	Péter Vörös (to (Hungary) Szolnoki MÁV FC)
36	DF	HUN	Szabolcs Schindler (to (Hungary) Szolnoki MÁV FC)
—	MF	SVN	Uroš Veselič (released)

== Club ==
=== Coaching staff ===
Position	Staff
Manager	(Hungary) István Urbányi
Assistant managers	(Serbia) Ede Visinka
First team fitness coach	(Hungary) Sándor Puskás
Goalkeeping coach	(Hungary) Sándor Erdei
Masseur	(Hungary) Tibor Dóra
Masseur	(Hungary) Ferenc Bozóki
Reserve team manager	(Hungary) László Török
Youth team manager	(Hungary) László Török

Last updated: 13 July 2010

=== Other information ===
General Manager	(Hungary) János Versegi
Sport Director	(Hungary) László Losonczy
Technical Leader	(Hungary) Attila Juhász S.
Communication Leader	(Hungary) Angéla Forczek
Ground (capacity and dimensions)	Széktói Stadion (6,300 / 105x68 meters)

Updated to match played 13 July 2010

== Squad ==
=== First-team squad ===
Note: Flags indicate national team as defined under FIFA eligibility rules; some limited exceptions apply. Players may hold more than one non-FIFA nationality.

No.	Pos.	Nation	Player
2	MF	HUN	Zsolt Patvaros
3	MF	HUN	Electo Wilson
4	DF	MNE	Mladen Lambulić
5	DF	HUN	István Farkas
6	DF	HUN	Béla Balogh
7	MF	SRB	Aleksandar Alempijević
8	DF	HUN	Zsolt Koncz
9	FW	HUN	Attila Simon
9	FW	HUN	Marcell Balog
10	MF	MNE	Vladan Savić
11	FW	HUN	Csaba Csordás
12	DF	HUN	Norbert Némedi
13	GK	HUN	Ádám Holczer

No.	Pos.	Nation	Player
14	MF	SRB	Vladan Čukić
15	DF	ROU	Attila Gyagya
17	MF	CMR	Bodiong Christian Ebala
18	MF	CGO	Francis Litsingi
19	FW	CIV	Sindou Dosso
20	MF	CTA	Foxi Kethevoama
21	DF	HUN	Gábor Bori
22	MF	HUN	István Bagi
26	FW	HUN	Lajos Bertus
28	GK	SVK	Ladislav Rybánsky
55	FW	HUN	Attila Tököli
85	DF	HUN	Dávid Mohl

== Statistics ==
=== Appearances and goals ===
Last updated on 24 November 2010.

No.	Pos	Nat	Player	Total		NB 1		Hungarian Cup		League Cup	
No.	Pos	Nat	Player	Apps	Goals	Apps	Goals	Apps	Goals	Apps	Goals
1	GK	(Hungary) HUN	Zoltán Tóth	2	-3	0	0	0	0	2	-3
2	MF	(Hungary) HUN	Zsolt Patvaros	4	0	1	0	1	0	2	0
2	DF	(Hungary) HUN	Balázs Koszó	1	0	0	0	0	0	1	0
3	MF	(Hungary) HUN	Electo Wilson	4	2	3	0	0	0	1	2
4	DF	(Montenegro) MNE	Mladen Lambulić	10	0	9	0	1	0	0	0
5	DF	(Hungary) HUN	István Farkas	8	0	4	0	1	0	3	0
6	DF	(Hungary) HUN	Béla Balogh	14	1	13	1	1	0	0	0
7	MF	(Serbia) SRB	Aleksandar Alempijević	12	5	8	2	3	3	1	0
8	DF	(Hungary) HUN	Zsolt Koncz	7	1	6	0	0	0	1	1
9	FW	(Hungary) HUN	Attila Simon	4	2	3	1	0	0	1	1
9	FW	(Hungary) HUN	Marcell Balog	1	0	1	0	0	0	0	0
10	MF	(Montenegro) MNE	Vladan Savić	15	1	12	0	2	0	1	1
10	MF	(Hungary) HUN	Viktor Nagy	1	0	0	0	0	0	1	0
11	FW	(Hungary) HUN	Csaba Csordás	17	2	12	1	3	0	2	1
12	DF	(Hungary) HUN	Norbert Némedi	15	4	12	4	3	0	0	0
13	GK	(Hungary) HUN	Ádám Holczer	6	-17	5	-17	0	0	1	0
14	MF	(Serbia) SRB	Vladan Čukić	19	2	15	1	3	1	1	0
14	MF	(Serbia) SRB	Vladan Brdarić	1	0	0	0	0	0	1	0
15	DF	(Romania) ROU	Attila Gyagya	13	3	9	2	2	1	2	0
16	DF	(Hungary) HUN	András Farkas	2	0	0	0	0	0	2	0
17	MF	(Cameroon) CMR	Bodiong Christian Ebala	15	1	11	1	2	0	2	0
17	DF	(Hungary) HUN	Pál Urbán	2	0	0	0	0	0	2	0
18	MF	(Republic of the Congo) CGO	Francis Litsingi	18	6	14	4	3	1	1	1
19	FW	(Ivory Coast) CIV	Sindou Dosso	10	4	5	0	2	2	3	2
20	MF	(Central African Republic) CTA	Foxi Kethevoama	17	4	13	4	2	0	2	0
21	DF	(Hungary) HUN	Gábor Bori	17	0	14	0	1	0	2	0
21	DF	(Hungary) HUN	Gergő Máté	1	0	0	0	0	0	1	0
22	MF	(Hungary) HUN	István Bagi	5	0	1	0	1	0	3	0
23	MF	(Hungary) HUN	Ádám Hegedűs	1	0	0	0	0	0	1	0
26	MF	(Hungary) HUN	Lajos Bertus	7	0	3	0	1	0	3	0
27	FW	(Hungary) HUN	Tamás Szabó	3	0	0	0	1	0	2	0
28	GK	(Slovakia) SVK	Ladislav Rybánsky	14	-19	11	-18	3	-1	0	0
55	FW	(Hungary) HUN	Attila Tököli	16	6	14	6	2	0	0	0
85	DF	(Hungary) HUN	Dávid Mohl	12	0	10	0	2	0	0	0
88	DF	(Hungary) HUN	Viktor Tölgyesi	4	0	0	0	1	0	3	0

=== Top scorers ===
Includes all competitive matches. The list is sorted by shirt number when total goals are equal.

Last updated on 24 November 2010

Position	Nation	Number	Name	Soproni Liga	Hungarian Cup	League Cup	Total
1	(Hungary)	55	Attila Tököli	6	0	0	6
2	(Republic of the Congo)	18	Francis Litsingi	4	1	1	6
3	(Serbia)	7	Aleksandar Alempijević	2	3	0	5
4	(Hungary)	12	Norbert Némedi	4	0	0	4
5	(Central African Republic)	20	Foxi Kethevoama	4	0	0	4
6	(Ivory Coast)	19	Sindou Dosso	0	2	2	4
7	(Romania)	15	Attila Gyagya	2	1	0	3
8	(Serbia)	14	Vladan Čukić	1	1	0	2
9	(Hungary)	9	Attila Simon	1	0	1	2
10	(Hungary)	11	Csaba Csordás	1	0	1	2
11	(Hungary)	3	Electo Wilson	0	0	2	2
12	(Hungary)	6	Béla Balogh	1	0	0	1
13	(Cameroon)	17	Christian Ebala	1	0	0	1
14	(Hungary)	8	Zsolt Koncz	0	0	1	1
15	(Montenegro)	10	Vladan Savić	0	0	1	1
/	/	/	Own Goals	0	0	0	0
			TOTALS	27	8	9	44

=== Disciplinary record ===
Includes all competitive matches. Players with 1 card or more included only.

Last updated on 24 November 2010

Position	Nation	Number	Name	Soproni Liga		Hungarian Cup		League Cup		Total (Hu Total)	
Position	Nation	Number	Name	Booked	Sent off (straight red)	Booked	Sent off (straight red)	Booked	Sent off (straight red)	Booked	Sent off (straight red)
DF	(Montenegro)	4	Mladen Lambulić	2	0	0	0	0	0	2 (2)	0 (0)
MF	(Serbia)	7	Alex Alempijević	1	1	1	0	0	0	2 (1)	1 (1)
DF	(Hungary)	8	Zsolt Koncz	1	0	0	0	0	0	1 (1)	0 (0)
MF	(Montenegro)	10	Vladan Savić	1	0	0	0	0	0	1 (1)	0 (0)
FW	(Hungary)	11	Csaba Csordás	1	0	0	0	0	0	1 (1)	0 (0)
DF	(Hungary)	12	Norbert Némedi	1	0	1	0	0	0	2 (1)	0 (0)
GK	(Hungary)	13	Ádám Holczer	2	0	0	0	0	0	2 (2)	0 (0)
MF	(Serbia)	14	Vladan Čukić	4	0	0	0	0	0	4 (4)	0 (0)
DF	(Romania)	15	Attila Gyagya	5	0	1	0	0	0	6 (5)	0 (0)
MF	(Cameroon)	17	Christian Ebala	4	0	0	0	1	0	5 (4)	0 (0)
MF	(Republic of the Congo)	18	Francis Litsingi	1	0	0	0	0	0	1 (1)	0 (0)
MF	(Central African Republic)	20	Foxi Kethevoama	1	0	0	0	0	0	1 (1)	0 (0)
DF	(Hungary)	21	Gábor Bori	2	1	1	0	0	0	3 (2)	1 (1)
FW	(Hungary)	27	Tamás Szabó	0	0	0	0	1	0	1 (0)	0 (0)
GK	(Slovakia)	28	Ladislav Rybánsky	1	1	0	0	0	0	1 (1)	1 (1)
FW	(Hungary)	55	Attila Tököli	2	1	0	0	0	0	2 (2)	1 (1)
			TOTALS	29	4	4	0	2	0	35 (29)	4 (4)

=== Overall ===
Games played	21 (15 Soproni Liga, 3 Hungarian Cup and 3 Hungarian League Cup)
Games won	11 (6 Soproni Liga, 3 Hungarian Cup and 2 Hungarian League Cup)
Games drawn	1 (0 Soproni Liga, 0 Hungarian Cup and 1 Hungarian League Cup)
Games lost	9 (9 Soproni Liga, 0 Hungarian Cup and 0 Hungarian League Cup)
Goals scored	44
Goals conceded	39
Goal difference	+5
Yellow cards	35
Red cards	4
Worst discipline	(Romania) (Hungary) Attila Gyagya (6 (yellow card) , 0 (red card) )
Best result	4–0 (H) v Szolnoki MÁV FC – Hungarian League Cup – 24-11-2010
Worst result	2–6 (A) v Debreceni VSC – Nemzeti Bajnokság I – 14-08-2010
Most appearances	(Serbia) Vladan Čukić (19 appearances)
Top scorer	(Hungary) Attila Tököli (6 goals)
Top scorer	(Republic of the Congo) Francis Litsingi (6 goals)
Points	34/63 (53.97%)

Last updated: 24 November 2010
Source: Kecskeméti TE

== Nemzeti Bajnokság I ==
=== Classification ===
Pos	Team	Pld	W	D	L	GF	GA	GD	Pts	Qualification or relegation
10	Honvéd	30	11	7	12	36	39	−3	40	
11	Vasas	30	11	7	12	34	46	−12	40	
12	Kecskemét	30	11	3	16	51	56	−5	36	Qualification for Europa League second qualifying round (Note: Kecskemét have qualified for the second qualifying round of the 2011–12 UEFA Europa League after winning the 2010–11 Hungarian Cup.)
13	Pápa	30	10	5	15	39	52	−13	35	
14	Siófok	30	8	10	12	29	41	−12	34	

Source: soccerway.com
Rules for classification: 1st points; 2nd overall wins; 3rd goal difference; 4th goals scored

=== Results summary ===
Overall								Home						Away					
Pld	W	D	L	GF	GA	GD	Pts	W	D	L	GF	GA	GD	W	D	L	GF	GA	GD
15	6	0	9	27	35	−8	18	4	0	3	15	13	+2	2	0	6	12	22	−10

Last updated: 20 November 2010.
Source: NB1

=== Results by round ===
Round	1	2	3	4	5	6	7	8	9	10	11	12	13	14	15	16	17	18	19	20	21	22	23	24	25	26	27	28	29	30
Ground	A	H	A	H	A	H	A	H	A	A	H	A	H	A	H	H	A	H	A	H	A	H	A	H	H	A	H	A	H	A
Result	L	L	L	W	L	W	L	L	L	W	L	L	W	W	W															
Position	15	16	16	13	14	12	14	14	14	14	14	14	14	13	11															

Updated to match(es) played on 20 November 2010. Source: Matches
A = Away; H = Home; W = Win; D = Draw; L = Loss

=== Matches ===
31 July 2010
19:00 CEST

MTK Budapest FC	4–2 (2–2)	Kecskeméti TE
Tischler 6'; Kanta 28'; Pátkai (yellow card) 53'; Pintér 63'; Szabó (yellow card) 67'; Könyves 71' (red card) 88'; Sütő (yellow card) 90+3'; A. Pál (yellow card) 90+3'	(Report)	Litsingi 32'; Tököli 33' (yellow card) 85'; Csordás (yellow card) 77'; Čukić (yellow card) 78'; Bori (yellow card) 21' (yellow-red card) 89'

Stadion Hidegkuti Nándor, Budapest
Attendance: 600
Referee: István Vad
- MTK Budapest FC: Szatmári – Pintér, Sütő, Szekeres, Vadnai (Zámbó 63.) – Kanta (Nikházi 90.), Pátkai, Szabó (Könyves 70.), Vukadinovic – A. Pál, Tischler. Coach: József Garami.
- Kecskeméti TE – Ereco: Holczer – Lambulic, Némedi, Alempijevic – Bori, Cukic, Ebala, Foxi (Csordás 60.), Savic (Koncz 60.) – Tököli, Litsingi (A. Simon 75.). Coach: István Urbányi.
- G.: Tischler (6.), Kanta (28.), Pintér (63.), Könyves (71.) – Litsingi (32.), Tököli (33.)
- Y.: Pátkai (53.), Szabó (67.), Sütő (93.), Pál (93.) – Bori (21.), Csordás (77.), Cukic (78.), Tököli (85.)
- R.: Könyves (88.) – Bori (89.)

7 August 2010
20:00 CEST

Kecskeméti TE	1–2 (1–1)	Ferencvárosi TC
Ebala (yellow card) 41'; Tököli 45'; Čukić (yellow card) 70'	(Report)	Rósa 4'; Csizmadia (yellow card) 49'; Heinz (yellow card) 67'; Abdi 87'

Széktói Stadion, Kecskemét
Attendance: 6,500
Referee: Ferenc Bede
- Kecskeméti TE: Holczer – Némedi, B. Balogh, Lambulic, I. Farkas – Litsingi, Ebala, Cukic (Dosso 75.), Savic (Csordás 80.) – Foxi (Wilson 80.), Tököli. Coach: István Urbányi.
- Ferencvárosi TC: Ranilovic – Csizmadia, Z. Balog, Tutoric, Junior – Andrezinho (B. Tóth 61.), Maróti, Stanic (Pisanjuk 86.), Rósa, D. Kulcsár (Abdi 75.) – Heinz. Coach: László Prukner.
- G.: Tököli (45.) – Rósa (4.), Abdi (87.)
- Y.: Ebala (41.), Cukic (70.) – Csizmadia (49.), Heinz (67.)

14 August 2010
19:00 CEST

Debreceni VSC	6–2 (2–0)	Kecskeméti TE
Kiss 18' (red card) 87'; Coulibaly 33'; Czvitkovics 47' 84'; Kabát 86'; Dombi 91'	(Report)	Foxi 49' 74'; Ebala (yellow card) 75'; Tököli (red card) 77'; Čukić (yellow card) 87'; Holczer (yellow card) 91'

Stadion Oláh Gábor Út, Debrecen
Attendance: 5,500
Referee: Ádám Farkas
- Debreceni VSC: Malinauskas – Komlósi, Bernáth, Mijadinoski, Laczkó – T. Kulcsár (J. Varga 53.), Czvitkovics, Z. Kiss, P. Szakály (Dombi 76.) – Coulibaly, Kabát. Coach: András Herczeg.
- Kecskeméti TE: Holczer – Némedi (A. Simon 64.), B. Balogh, Lambulic, I. Farkas – Bori, Litsingi, Ebala, Savic (Cukic 46.) – Csordás (Foxi 46.), Tököli. Coach: István Urbányi.
- G.: Z. Kiss (18.), Coulibaly (33.), Czvitkovics (47., 84.), Kabát (86.), Dombi (91.) – Foxi (49., 74.)
- Y.: Ebala (75.), Cukic (87.), Holczer (91.)
- R.: Z. Kiss (87.) – Tököli (77.)

21 August 2010
20:00 CEST

Kecskeméti TE	4–2 (4–1)	Szolnoki MÁV FC
Simon 3' (pen.); Litsingi 5' 43'; Balogh 20'; Lambulić (yellow card) 21'; Gyagya (yellow card) 29'	(Report)	Hegedűs (yellow card) 3'; Alex 16'; Pető (yellow card) 18'; Pisanjuk (yellow card) 26'; Búrány (yellow card) 52'; Remili 76' (pen.); Molnár (red card) 84'

Széktói Stadion, Kecskemét
Attendance: 3,000
Referee: Szabolcs Szilasi
- Kecskeméti TE: Rybansky – Bori, Gyagya (Némedi 43.), Lambulic, Balogh – Ebala (Wilson 46.), Cukic, Koncz – Foxi, Simon (Dosso 78.), Litsingi. Coach: István Urbányi.
- Szolnoki MÁV FC: Rézsó – Cornaci, Pető, Hegedűs, Schindler – Remili, Búrány (Vörös 72.), Pisanjuk, Tchami (Ngalle 69.), Molnár – Alex (Marozas 46.). Coach: Attila Vágó.
- G.: Simon (3. – pen.), Litsingi (5., 43.), Balogh (20.) – Alex (16.), Remili (76. – pen.)
- Y.: Lambulic (21.), Gyagya (29.) – Hegedűs (3.), Pető (18.), Pisanjuk (26.), Búrány (52.)
- R.: Molnár (85.)

28 August 2010
19:00 CEST

Zalaegerszegi TE	2–1 (1–0)	Kecskeméti TE
Rajcomar 9' (pen.) 73'; Kamber (yellow card) 17'; Bogunović (yellow card) 64'; Miljatovič (yellow card) 60' (yellow-red card) 82'	(Report)	Rybánsky (yellow card) 8' (yellow-red card) 66'; Némedi 83' (pen.)

ZTE Arena, Zalaegerszeg
Attendance: 2,500
Referee: Péter Solymosi
- Zalaegerszegi TE: Vlaszák – Kovács, Miljatovic, Bogunovic, Varga – Szalai, Kamber, Illés (Delic 78.), Máté – Rajcomar (Horváth 83.), Balázs (Kocsárdi 88.). Coach: János Csank.
- Kecskeméti TE: Rybánsky – Bori, Lambulic, Balogh, Farkas (Holczer 68.) – Némedi, Cukic (Savic 55.), Koncz (Dosso 83.) – Foxi, Tököli, Litsingi. Coach: István Urbányi.
- G.: Rajcomar (9. – pen., 73.) – Némedi (83. – pen.)
- Y.: Kamber (17.), Miljatovic (60.), Bogunovic (64.) – Rybánsky (8.)
- R.: Miljatovic (82.) – Rybánsky (66.)

9 October 2010
16:30 CEST

Kecskeméti TE	1–0 (0–0)	Szombathelyi Haladás
Tököli (yellow card) 4'; Némedi 79' (pen.)	(Report)	Irhás (yellow card) 12'; Molnár (yellow card) 20'

Széktói Stadion, Kecskemét
Attendance: 2,000
Referee: Péter Solymosi
- Kecskeméti TE: Rybánsky – Farkas (Cukic 55.), Gyagya, Némedi, Balogh, Mohl – Bori, Csordás, Savic (Bertus 66.), Ebala – Tököli (Balog 92.). Coach: László Losonczy.
- Szombathelyi Haladás: Rózsa – Lengyel, Schimmer, Guzmics, Tóth – Molnár, Sipos (Lattenstein 80.), Á. Simon – Nagy, Kenesei (Oross 64.), Irhás (Obric 64.). Coach: Aurél Csertői.
- G.: Némedi (79. – pen.)
- Y.: Tököli (4.) – Irhás (12.), Molnár (20.)

18 September 2010
19:00 CEST

Lombard-Pápa TFC	4–1 (3–1)	Kecskeméti TE
Gyömbér 8' (yellow card) 30'; Takács 13'; Rebryk 40'; Heffler (yellow card) 72' (goal) 90+8'	(Report)	Gyagya (yellow card) 10' (goal) 11'; Holczer (yellow card) 40'; Bori (yellow card) 43'; Lambulić (yellow card) 45'; Koncz (yellow card) 63'

Stadion Várkerti, Pápa
Attendance: 1,000
Referee: Zoltán Iványi
- Lombard-Pápa TFC: Szűcs – Takács (Venczel 90.+9), Farkas, Bíró, Németh – Quintero, Gyömbér, Heffler – Abwo (Rebryk 33.), Bárányos, Maric (Jovánczai 90.+2). Coach: György Véber.
- Kecskeméti TE – Ereco: Holczer – Bori, Gyagya, Lambulic, Balogh (Mohl 55.) – Ebala, Cukic, Koncz (Savic 72.), Alempijevic (Csordás 46.) – Litsingi, Tököli. Coach: István Urbányi.
- G.: Gyömbér (8.), Takács (13.), Rebryk (40.), Heffler (90.+8) – Gyagya (11.)
- Y.: Gyömbér (30.), Heffler (72.) – Holczer (40.), Bori (43.), Lambulic (45.), Koncz (63.)

25 September 2010
18:00 CEST

Kecskeméti TE	0–1 (0–0)	Paksi SE
Alempijević (red card) 69'	(Report)	Fiola (yellow card) 44'; Böde (yellow card) 47'; Csehi (yellow card) 75'; Magasföldi (red card) 77'; Éger (yellow card) 79'; Montvai (yellow card) 82' (goal) 90+4'

Széktói Stadion, Kecskemét
Attendance: 3,000
Referee: Roland Veizer
- Kecskeméti TE: Rybánsky – Balogh (Wilson 85.), Gyagya, Lambulic, Mohl – Alempijevic, Cukic, Koncz – Litsingi (Csordás 56.), Tököli, Foxi (Bori 72.). Coach: István Urbányi.
- Paksi SE: Csernyánszki – Heffler (Lisztes 91.), Fiola, Éger, Csehi – Sipeki, Bartha, Böde, Vayer (Báló 74.) – Montvai, Kiss (Magasföldi 65.). Coach: Károly Kis.
- G.: Montvai (90.+4)
- Y.: Fiola (44.), Böde (47.), Csehi (75.), Éger (79.), Montvai (82.)
- R.: Alempijevic (69.) – Magasföldi (77.)

2 October 2010
18:00 CEST

Kaposvári Rákóczi FC	2–1 (2–1)	Kecskeméti TE
Oláh (yellow card) 15' (goal) 37'; Jawad 19'	(Report)	Gyagya 12' (yellow card) 87'; Bori (yellow card) 64'; Čukić (yellow card) 71'

Stadion Kaposvár Rákoczi, Kaposvár
Attendance: 2,000
Referee: Alvaro Miquel Garcia
- Kaposvári Rákóczi FC: Kovács – Okuka, Zahorecz, Zsók, Gujic – Hegedűs (Kulcsár 53.), Balázs, Pedro (Grúz 85.), Jawad (Pavlovic 73.) – Oláh, Peric. Coach: Tibor Sisa.
- Kecskeméti TE: Rybánsky – Némedi, Gyagya, Balogh, Mohl – Csordás, Cukic, Koncz (Savic 60.), Litsingi (Bori 55.), Foxi – Tököli. Coach: István Szabó.
- G.: Jawad (19.), Oláh (37.) – Gyagya (12.)
- Y.: Oláh (15.) – Bori (64.), Cukic (71.), Gyagya (87.)

16 October 2010
17:00 CEST

Budapest Honvéd FC	1–2 (0–2)	Kecskeméti TE
Rouani 49'; Akassou (yellow card) 61' (yellow-red card) 78'	(Report)	Tököli 18' 43'; Ebala (yellow card) 45'; Foxi (yellow card) 78'

Bozsik Stadion, Budapest
Attendance: 3,500
Referee: Zsolt Szabó
- Budapest Honvéd FC: Kemenes – Takács, Debreceni, Botis, Hajdú – Abass, Akassou, Coira (Conteh 72.), Danilo – Rouani (Bojtor 79.), Rufino (Sadjo 60.). Coach: Massimo Morales.
- Kecskeméti TE: Rybánsky – Némedi, Gyagya, Balogh (Lambulic 46.), Mohl – Bori, Ebala (Alempijevic 54.), Cukic – Foxi, Tököli (Litsingi 84.), Bertus. Coach: Tomislav Sivic.
- G.: Rouani (49.) – Tököli (18., 43.)
- Y.: Akassou (61.) – Ebala (45.), Foxi (78.)
- R.: Akassou (78.)

23 October 2010
15:00 CEST

Kecskeméti TE	2–4 (1–1)	Videoton FC Fehérvár
Némedi 21' (pen.); Gyagya (yellow card) 53'; Savić (yellow card) 66'; Csordás 74'	(Report)	Alves 27' 46'; Polonkai 62' (yellow card) 74'; Nikolić 71' (yellow card) 72'

Széktói Stadion, Kecskemét
Attendance: 5,000
Referee: Ferenc Bede
- Kecskeméti TE: Rybánsky – Némedi, Lambulic, Gyagya, Mohl – Bori, Cukic, Foxi (Savic 62.), Ebala, Bertus (Csordás 47.) – Tököli (Litsingi 52.). Coach: Tomislav Sivic.
- Videoton FC Fehérvár: Bozovic – Lázár, Lipták, Vaskó, Andic – Gosztonyi (Nikolic 61.), Sándor (Szakály 80.), Farkas, Elek, Djordjic (Polonkai 46.) – Alves. Coach: György Mezey.
- G.: Némedi (21. – pen.), Csordás (74.) – Alves (27., 46.), Polonkai (62.), Nikolic (71.)
- Y.: Gyagya (53.), Savic (66.) – Nikolic (72.), Polonkai (74.)

30 October 2010
17:30 CEST

Győri ETO FC	2–1 (2–1)	Kecskeméti TE
Fehér (yellow card) 16'; Pilibaitis 18' (pen.); Bouguerra 38'; Đorđević (yellow card) 58'; Völgyi (yellow card) 72'	(Report)	Némedi 45+2' (pen.); Ebala (yellow card) 76'; Litsingi (yellow card) 82'

ETO Park, Győr
Attendance: 2,500
Referee: Sándor Andó-Szabó
- Győri ETO FC: Radosavljevic – Fehér, Stanisic, Dordevic, Szabó (Völgyi 15.) – Tokody (Ganugrava 90.), Pilibaitis, Trajkovic, Koltai (Sharashenidze 62.) – Ceolin, Bouguerra. Coach: Attila Pintér.
- Kecskeméti TE – Ereco: Rybánsky – Alempijevic, Némedi, Balogh, Mohl – Bori (Csordás 80.), Cukic (Dosso 80.), Foxi, Savic (Ebala 64.), Litsingi – Tököli. Coach: Tomislav Sivic.
- G.: Pilibaitis (18. – pen.), Bouguerra (38.) – Némedi (45.+2 – pen.)
- Y.: Fehér (16.), Dordevic (58.), Völgyi (72.) – Ebala (76.), Litsingi (82.)

5 November 2010
17:00 CEST

Kecskeméti TE	4–3 (1–1)	Újpest FC
Foxi 9'; Alempijević 48' (yellow card) 49'; Tököli 67'; Gyagya (yellow card) 75'; Čukić 80'; Rybánsky (yellow card) 84'	(Report)	Vermes (yellow card) 22'; Böőr 39'; Szokol (yellow card) 57'; Rajczi 87' (pen.); Barczi 89'

Széktói Stadion, Kecskemét
Attendance: 3,500
Referee: Péter Solymosi
- Kecskeméti TE: Rybánsky – Alempijevic (Patvaros 82.), Gyagya, Balogh, Mohl – Bori (Tököli 65.), Némedi, Cukic, Savic, Foxi (Csordás 82.) – Litsingi. Coach: Tomislav Sivic.
- Újpest FC: Balajcza – Szokol (Kiss 58.), Takács, Vermes, Pollák – Simek (Simon 70.), Egerszegi, Mitrovic, Böőr – Rajczi, Tisza (Barczi 70.). Coach: Géza Mészöly.
- G.: Foxi (9.), Alempijevic (48.), Tököli (67.), Cukic (80.) – Böőr (39.), Rajczi (87. – pen.), Barczi (89.)
- Y.: Alempijevic (49.), Gyagya (75.), Rybánsky (84.) – Vermes (22.), Szokol (57.)

13 November 2010
15:00 CEST

BFC Siófok	1–2 (1–1)	Kecskeméti TE
Mohl 39' (o.g.)	(Report)	Foxi 43'; Tököli 76'

Révesz Géza Stadion, Siófok
Attendance: 1,000
Referee: Viktor Kassai
- BFC Siófok: Molnár – Mogyorósi, Fehér, Graszl, Novák – Homma (Piller 70.), Tusori, Kecskés (Délczeg 46.), Lukács – Sowunmi, Ivancsics (Kocsis 77.). Coach: István Mihalecz.
- Kecskeméti TE – Ereco: Rybánsky – Bori (Ebala 67.), Bagi, Balogh, Mohl – Cukic, Foxi, Savic, Litsingi (Csordás 82.), Alempijevic – Tököli (Dosso 89.). Coach: Tomislav Sivic.
- G.: Mohl (39. – o.g.) – Foxi (43.), Tököli (76.)
- Y.: —

20 November 2010
15:00 CEST

Kecskeméti TE	3–1 (1–1)	Vasas SC
Alempijević 10'; Némedi (yellow card) 40'; Litsingi 60'; Ebala 67'	(Report)	Németh 30'; Gáspár (yellow card) 66'

Széktói Stadion, Kecskemét
Attendance: 2,000
Referee: Roland Veizer
- Kecskeméti TE: Rybánsky – Némedi (Ebala 40.), Gyagya, Balogh, Mohl – Cukic, Foxi, Savic (Bori 80.), Litsingi (Csordás 76.), Alempijevic – Tököli. Coach: Tomislav Sivic.
- Vasas SC: Végh – Balog, Gáspár, Kovács, Mileusnic (Arnaut 39.) – Arsic, Pavicevic, Dobric (Phantkhava 70.), Németh (Bakos 62.), Katona – Ferenczi. Coach: András Komjáti.
- G.: Alempijevic (10.), Litsingi (60.), Ebala (67.) – Németh (30.)
- Y.: Némedi (40.) – Gáspár (66.)

== Hungarian Cup ==
=== Third round ===
22 September 2010
18:00 CEST

Békéscsaba 1912 Előre SE	1–2 (1–1)	Kecskeméti TE
Balázs 35'; Oláh (yellow card) 80'	(Report)	Gyagya 40' (yellow card) 82'; Alempijević 76'

Stadion Kórház utcai, Békéscsaba
Attendance: 500
Referee: Ádám Németh
- Békéscsaba 1912 Előre SE: Stumpf – Oláh, Csiszár, Makra, Juhász – Szélpál, Olteanu, Horváth (Lázok 69.), Pozsár – Bernáth (Csák 61.), Balázs (Bakró 58.). Coach: József Pásztor.
- Kecskeméti TE – Ereco: Rybansky – Mohl, Lambulic, Gyagya, Alempijevic – Némedi, Cukic, Ebala, Litsingi – Csordás (Foxi 69.), Dosso (Tököli 19.). Coach: István Urbányi.
- G.: Balázs (35.) – Gyagya (40.), Alempijevic (76.)
- Y.: Oláh (80.) – Gyagya (82.)

=== Fourth round ===
27 October 2010
14:30 CEST

Tiszakanyár SE	0–3 (0–2)	Kecskeméti TE
	(Report)	Čukić 15'; Dosso 17' 62'

Városi Sporttelep, Tiszakanyár
Attendance: 500
Referee: Roland Veizer
- Tiszakanyár SE: Gazsi – Gombkötő (Hadházi 60.), Tóth, Fekete, Balázsi – Orgonáv, Kóka, Simon (Marics 46.), Jánvári – Kiss (Deák 46.), Dolhai. Coach: Máté Gerliczki.
- Kecskeméti TE – Ereco: Rybánsky – Alempijevic, Bagi, Némedi, Farkas (Szabó 64.) – Savic, Cukic (Tölgyesi 62.), Litsingi (Patvaros 72.) – Csordás, Dosso, Bertus. Coach: Tomislav Sivic.
- G.: Cukic (15.), Dosso (17., 62.)

=== Fifth round ===
==== First leg ====
10 November 2010
17:30 CEST

Debreceni VSC	0–3 (0–2)	Kecskeméti TE
Kabát (yellow card) 40'; Máté (red card) 47'	(Report)	Litsingi 23'; Alempijević 43' 50' (yellow card) 64'; Némedi (yellow card) 61'; Bori (yellow card) 90'

Stadion Oláh Gábor Út, Debrecen
Attendance: 500
Referee: Szabolcs Szilasi
- Debreceni VSC: Verpecz – Bernáth, Komlósi, Máté, Korhut – Bódi, Spitzmüller, Kiss, Pavlovic (Szűcs 51.) – Kabát (Laczkó 57.), Szilágyi (Coulibaly 64.). Coach: András Herczeg.
- Kecskeméti TE – Ereco: Rybánsky – Némedi, Gyagya, Balogh, Mohl – Litsingi (Bori 56.), Ebala (Csordás 74.), Cukic (Savic 54.), Alempijevic – Tököli, Foxi. Coach: Tomislav Sivic.
- G.: Litsingi (23.), Alempijevic (43., 50.)
- Y.: Kabát (40.) – Némedi (61.), Alempijevic (64.), Bori (90.)
- R.: Máté (47.)

== League Cup ==
=== Group stage ===
Pos	Team	Pld	W	D	L	GF	GA	GD	Pts	Qualification
1	Kecskemét	4	3	1	0	11	3	+8	10	Advance to knockout phase
2	Szolnok	4	1	1	2	6	10	−4	4	
3	Honvéd	4	1	0	3	7	11	−4	3	

28 July 2010
19:00 CEST

Kecskeméti TE	4–2 (3–0)	Budapest Honvéd FC
Wilson 32' 69'; A. Simon 33'; Koncz 43'	(Report)	Cséke (yellow card) 45'; Haruna 46'; Vólent 66'

Széktói Stadion, Kecskemét
Attendance: 400
Referee: Gábor Oláh
- Kecskeméti TE: Z. Tóth – Bori (I. Farkas 60.), Gyagya, Koncz, Alempijevic (Foxi 46.) – Cukic (Tölgyesi 46.), Bertus, Bagi, Wilson – A. Simon (Ebala 10.), Dosso (T. Szabó 60.). Coach: István Urbányi.
- Budapest Honvéd FC: Kunsági – Baráth (G. Nagy 46.), Remes, Cséke, Czár (A. Nagy 46.) – Sós, Hidi, A. Horváth (Azevedo 46.), Bojtor (M. Farkas 75.) – Vólent, Haruna (Vernes 72.). Coach: Krisztián Gabala.
- G.: Wilson (32., 69.), A. Simon (33.), Koncz (43.) – Haruna (46.), Vólent (66.)
- Y.: Cséke (45.)

3 November 2010
13:00 CEST

Szolnoki MÁV FC	1–1 (0–0)	Kecskeméti TE
Antal (yellow card) 23'; Koós 58'	(Report)	Szabó (yellow card) 70'; Csordás 90+1'

Tiszaligeti Stadion, Szolnok
Attendance: 200
Referee: Gyöngyi Gaál
- Szolnoki MÁV FC: Tarczy – Schindler, Antal (Stanisic 60.), Rokszin – Búrány, Mile (Vörös 51.), Lengyel, Tchami – Ngalle (Molnár 83.), Remili (Koós 51.), Hevesi-Tóth (Szalai 62.). Coach: Antal Simon.
- Kecskeméti TE: Tóth – Bagi, Urbán, Gyagya (Tölgyesi 46.), I. Farkas (Máté 72.) – Patvaros (Brdaric 52.) – Csordás, Hegedűs (Nagy 46.), Bertus (A. Farkas 52.), Szabó – Dosso. Coach: Tomislav Sivic.
- G.: Koós (58.) – Csordás (91.)
- Y.: Antal (23.) – Szabó (70.)

24 November 2010
13:00 CEST

Kecskeméti TE	4–0 (1–0)	Szolnoki MÁV FC
Dosso 30' 55'; Ebala (yellow card) 32'; Savić 59' (pen.); Litsingi 70'	(Report)	Hevesi-Tóth (yellow card) 27'; Tarczy (yellow card) 58'; Antal (yellow card) 73'

Széktói Stadion, Kecskemét
Attendance: 200
Referee: Gergely Szőts
- Kecskeméti TE: Holczer – Koszó, Urbán, Bagi, I. Farkas – Patvaros (Tölgyesi 46.), Bertus (A. Farkas 63.), Ebala (Savic 46.), Bori (Litsingi 46.) – Dosso, Csordás (Foxi 46.). Coach: Tomislav Sivic.
- Szolnoki MÁV FC: Tarczy – Schindler, Urbán-Szabó, Antal, Rokszin – Hevesi-Tóth, Vörös (N. Tóth 72.), Tchami (Felföldi 63.), Blaskovits (Szép 85.) – Lengyel, Kalmár (Kalóz 88.). Coach: Antal Simon.
- G.: Dosso (30., 55.), Savic (59. – pen.), Litsingi (70.)
- Y.: Ebala (32.) – Hevesi-Tóth (27.), Tarczy (58.), Antal (73.)
