= 2011 Magyar Kupa final =

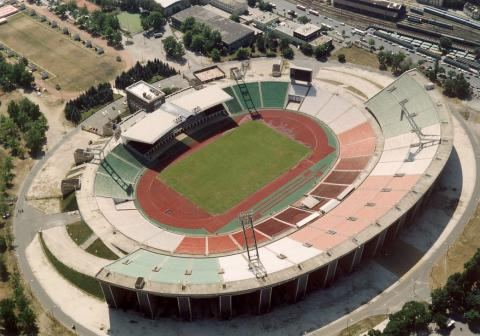
- Puskás Ferenc Stadion hosted the final
- Event: 2010–11 Magyar Kupa
| Kecskemét | Videoton |
| 3 | 2 |
- Date: 17 May 2011
- Venue: Puskás Ferenc Stadion, Budapest
- Referee: Zoltán Iványi
- Attendance: 5,000

The Magyar Kupa final was the final match of the 2010–11 Magyar Kupa, played between Kecskemét and Videoton.

== Teams ==
| Team | Previous finals appearances (bold indicates winners) |
|---|---|
| Kecskemét | None |
| Videoton | 3 (1982, 2001, **2006**) |

== Route to the final ==
| Kecskemét | | | Round | Videoton |
|---|---|---|---|---|---|---|
| Opponent | Result | Legs | | Opponent | Result | Legs |
| Békéscsaba | 2–1 | | Round 3 |
| Tiszakanyár | 3–0 | | Round 4 | Baja | 4–2 |
| Debrecen | 6–1 | 3–0 away; 3–1 home | Round of 16 | Haladás | 6–1 | 3–0 home; 3–1 away |
| Siófok | 6–2 | 5–1 home; 1–1 away | Quarterfinals | Honvéd | 5–1 | 1–1 away; 4–0 home |
| Zalaegerszegi | 5–1 | 5–1 home; 0–0 away | Semifinals | Kaposvár | 5–0 | 1–0 away; 4–0 home |

== Match ==
17 May 2011
10:00 CEST

| Kecskemét | 3–2 | Videoton |
|---|---|---|
| Kéthévoama 2', 14', 80' | Summary; Report (Hungarian) | Čukić 48' (o.g.); Nikolić 82' |

Puskás Ferenc Stadion, Budapest
Attendance: 5,000
Referee: Zoltán Iványi

| **Kecskemét** | **Videoton** |

| GK | 28 | (Slovakia) Ladislav Rybánsky |
| DF | 6 | (Hungary) Béla Balogh |
| DF | 4 | (Serbia) Siniša Radanović |
| DF | 85 | (Hungary) Dávid Mohl |
| DF | 15 | (Romania) Attila Gyagya |
| MF | 21 | (Hungary) Gábor Bori |
| MF | 17 | (Cameroon) Christian Ebala |
| MF | 20 | (Central African Republic) Foxi Kéthévoama (substituted off) 90+3' |
| MF | 14 | (Serbia) Vladan Čukić (substituted off) 90+1' |
| MF | 18 | (Republic of the Congo) Francis Litsingi (yellow card) 65' |
| FW | 55 | (Hungary) Attila Tököli (yellow card) 65' (substituted off) 87' |
Substitutes:
| GK | 31 | (Hungary) Botond Antal |
| DF | 2 | (Hungary) Balázs Koszó |
| MF | 26 | (Hungary) Lajos Bertus (substituted on) 90+1' |
| MF | 10 | (Montenegro) Vladan Savić (substituted on) 90+3' |
| MF | 5 | (Hungary) István Farkas |
| MF | 7 | (Serbia) Aleksandar Alempijević |
| FW | 19 | (Ivory Coast) Sindou Dosso (substituted on) 87' |
Manager:
(Serbia) Tomislav Sivić

| GK | 1 | (Hungary) Zsolt Sebők |
| DF | 23 | (Hungary) Tamás Vaskó |
| DF | 20 | (Hungary) Pál Lázár |
| DF | 5 | (Hungary) Zoltán Lipták |
| MF | 11 | (Hungary) György Sándor |
| MF | 14 | (Hungary) Balázs Farkas (substituted off) 60' |
| MF | 8 | (Hungary) Attila Polonkai (yellow card) 40' (substituted off) 46' |
| MF | 25 | (Hungary) Ákos Elek |
| MF | 16 | (Hungary) András Gosztonyi (substituted off) 70' |
| FW | 21 | (Brazil) André Alves |
| FW | 17 | (Hungary) Nemanja Nikolić |
Substitutes:
| GK | 22 | (Montenegro) Mladen Božović |
| DF | 4 | (Hungary) Sándor Hidvégi |
| DF | 28 | (Hungary) Martin Izing |
| MF | 6 | (Serbia) Dušan Vasiljević (substituted on) 46' |
| MF | 7 | (Hungary) Dénes Szakály (substituted on) 60' |
| MF | 15 | (Hungary) Dániel Nagy |
| FW | 19 | (Hungary) László Lencse (substituted on) 70' |
Manager:
(Hungary) György Mezey
