= 2015 Magyar Kupa final =

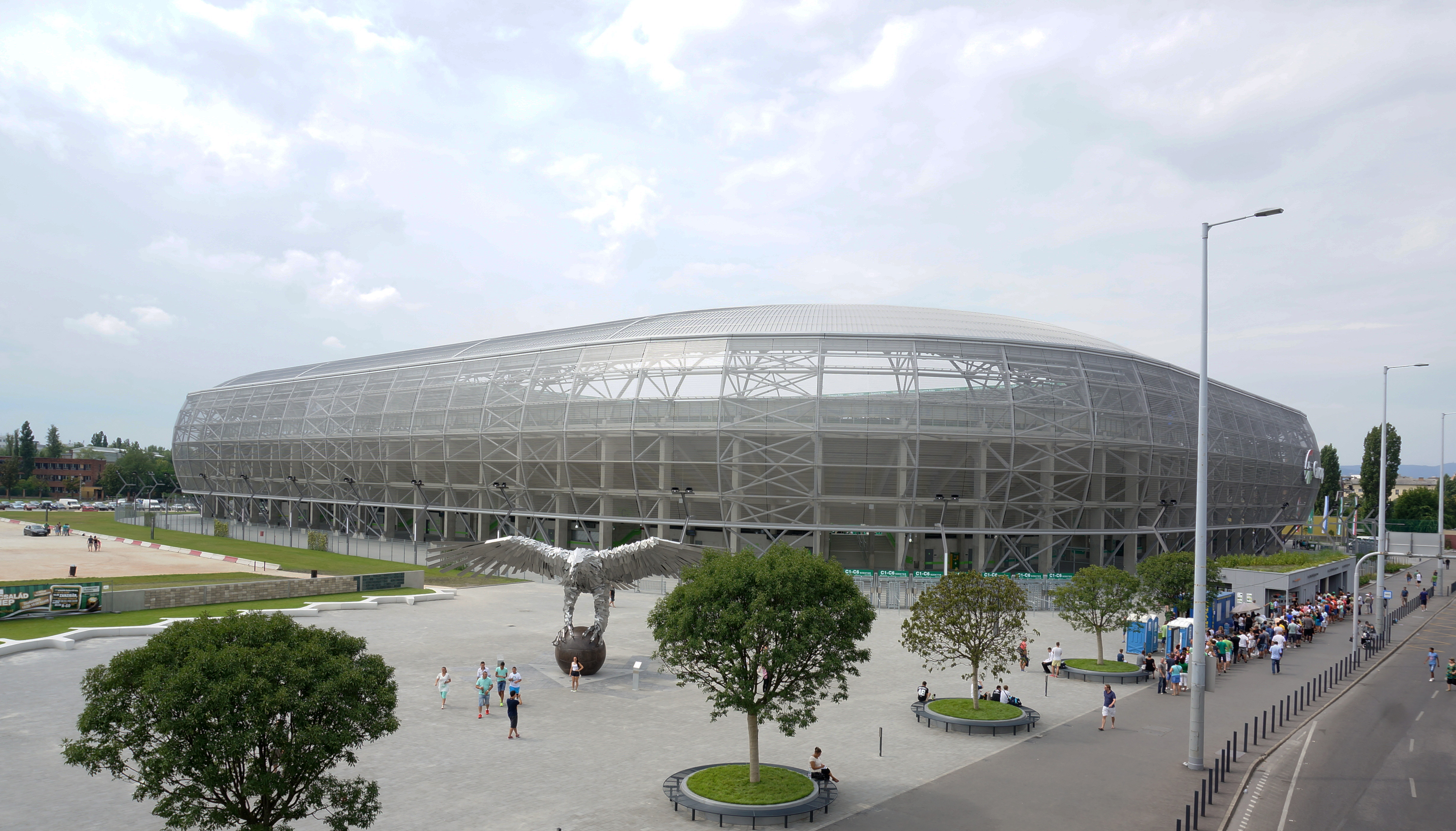
- Groupama Arena hosted the final
- Event: 2014–15 Magyar Kupa
Videoton	Ferencváros
0	4
- Date: 20 May 2015
- Venue: Groupama Arena, Budapest
- Referee: Zoltán Iványi
- Attendance: 15,525

The Magyar Kupa final was the final match of the 2014–15 Magyar Kupa, played between Videoton and Ferencváros.

== Teams ==
Team	Previous finals appearances (bold indicates winners)
Videoton	4 (1982, 2001, **2006**, 2011)
Ferencváros	29 (1912, **1913**, **1922**, **1927**, **1928**, 1931, 1932, **1933**, **1935**, **1942**, **1943**, **1944**, **1958**, 1966, **1972**, **1974**, **1976**, 1977, **1978**, 1979, 1986, 1989, **1991**, **1993**, **1994**, **1995**, **2003**, **2004**, 2005)

== Route to the final ==
Videoton			Round	Ferencváros
Opponent	Result	Legs		Opponent	Result	Legs
Rákosmenti KSK	8–0		First Round	Hévíz	8–0
Testvériség	7–0		Second Round	Vecsés	6–1
Szigetszentmiklós	2–1		Third Round	Erzsébeti Spartacus	3–0
Diósgyőr	2–1		Fourth Round	Honvéd	0–0 (3–1 (p))
Pécs	5–1	2–1 home; 3–0 away	Quarterfinals	Csákvár	10–0	5–0 home; 5–0 away
Újpest	5–1	1–0 home; 4–1 away	Semifinals	Szolnok	3–1	2–0 away; 1–1 home

== Match ==
20 May 2015
20:00 CEST

Videoton	0–4	Ferencváros
	Report	Varga 54'; Batik 60'; Lamah 70'; Szolnoki 87' (o.g.)

Groupama Arena, Budapest
Attendance: 15,525
Referee: Zoltán Iványi

**Videoton**	**Ferencváros**

GK	(Spain) Juan Calatayud (yellow card) 61'
RB	(Hungary) Roland Szolnoki
DF	(Hungary) Roland Juhász (yellow card) 45'
DF	(Brazil) Paulo Vinícius
LB	(Cape Verde) Stopira
MF	(Hungary) György Sándor
MF	(Portugal) Filipe Oliveira (yellow card) 33' (substituted off) 63'
MF	(Hungary) Ádám Simon (substituted off) 63'
MF	(Hungary) István Kovács (substituted off) 71'
FW	(Hungary) Ádám Gyurcsó
FW	(Hungary) Nemanja Nikolić
Substitutes:
GK	(Serbia) Filip Pajović
DF	(Hungary) András Fejes
MF	(Croatia) Dinko Trebotić (substituted on) 63'
MF	(Hungary) Tibor Heffler
FW	(El Salvador) Arturo Álvarez (substituted on) 63'
FW	(Hungary) Róbert Feczesin (substituted on) 71'
FW	(North Macedonia) Mirko Ivanovski
Manager:
(Spain) Joan Carrillo

GK	(Hungary) Dénes Dibusz
DF	(Croatia) Mateo Pavlović
DF	(Austria) Emir Dilaver
DF	(Ecuador) Cristian Ramírez (substituted off) 89'
MF	(Hungary) Bence Batik (yellow card) 13'
MF	(Brazil) Somália
MF	(Hungary) Ádám Nagy (substituted off) 70'
MF	(Hungary) Zoltán Gera (yellow card) 67' (substituted off) 87'
WI	(Belgium) Roland Lamah
FW	(Hungary) Dániel Böde
WI	(Hungary) Roland Varga
Substitutes:
GK	(Hungary) Levente Jova
DF	(Germany) Philipp Bönig (substituted on) 89'
MF	(Hungary) Gábor Gyömbér (substituted on) 70'
MF	(Serbia) Vladan Čukić (substituted on) 87'
MF	(Hungary) Attila Haris
MF	(Hungary) Dominik Nagy
FW	(Germany) Benjamin Lauth
Manager:
(Germany) Thomas Doll
