= Grkinić =

Grkinić is a surname. People with the surname include:

- Božo Grkinić, a Yugoslav sportsperson
- Goran Grkinić, a Serbian footballer
