= Romeo Mitrović =

Bosnian former football goalkeeper (born 1979)

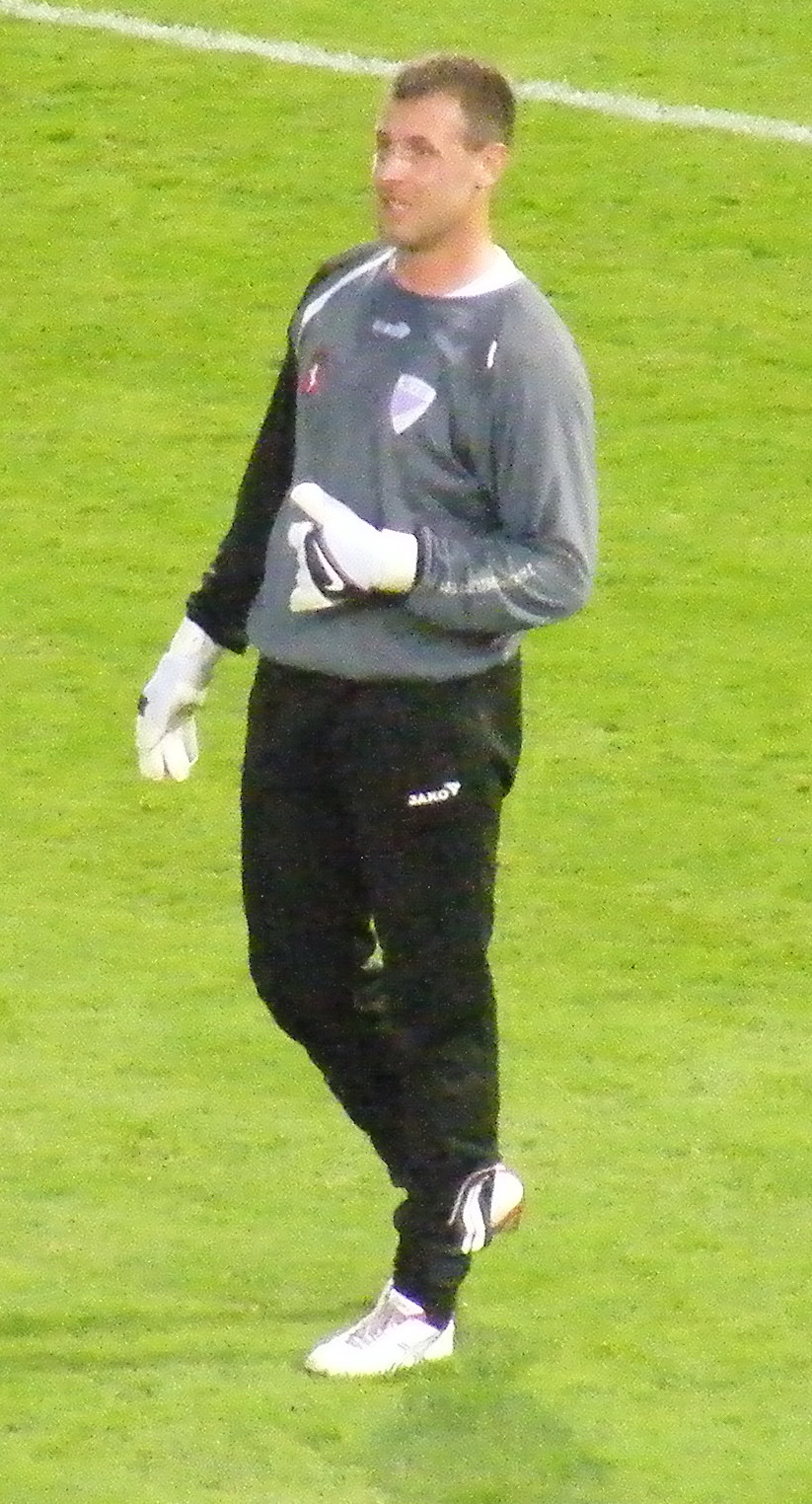

Personal information
- Date of birth: 12 July 1979 (age 47)
- Place of birth: Tuzla, SFR Yugoslavia
- Height: 1.86 m (6 ft 1 in)
- Position: Goalkeeper

Senior career*
Years	Team	Apps	(Gls)
1998–2001	Sloboda Tuzla	7	(0)
2001–2003	Osijek	1	(0)
2003–2004	Sloboda Tuzla		
2004–2008	Zrinjski Mostar	97	(0)
2008–2010	Kecskemét	37	(0)
2010	Nybergsund	6	(0)
2010–2012	Lokomotiva	37	(0)
2012–2013	Dinamo Zagreb	0	(0)
2013–2014	Bratstvo Gračanica	10	(0)
2014	Branitelj	8	(0)

International career
2001–2006	Bosnia and Herzegovina	4	(0)
2001	Bosnia and Herzegovina XI	2	(0)
- * Club domestic league appearances and goals

Romeo Mitrović (born 12 July 1979) is a Bosnian retired football goalkeeper.

== Club career ==
During the time spent in FK Sloboda Tuzla and HŠK Zrinjski Mostar, he proved himself as goalkeeper, and played in HŠK Zrinjski Mostar.

In June 2008, he came from HŠK Zrinjski Mostar to Kecskeméti TE, and in 2010 Mitrović moved from Kecskeméti TE to Nybergsund IL-Trysil in the Norwegian Adeccoliga. In January 2012 he joined Dinamo Zagreb, but in June 2013 he left the club, making only a single appearance in a cup match against lower league side NK Vrsar. His career ended when he was banned for punching a referee, while playing for Branitelj in 2014.

== International career ==
He made his debut for Bosnia and Herzegovina in a June 2001 Merdeka Tournament match away against Slovakia and has earned a total of 6 caps, scoring no goals. Two of his games at the Merdeka were unofficial, though. His final international was a May 2006 friendly match away against Iran.
