= Pavle Velimirović =

Montenegrin footballer

Personal information
- Full name: Pavle Velimirović
- Date of birth: 11 April 1990 (age 36)
- Place of birth: Titograd, SFR Yugoslavia
- Height: 1.86 m (6 ft 1 in)
- Position: Goalkeeper

Team information
- Current team: Dečić
- Number: 13

Youth career
- Crvena Stijena
- Partizan

Senior career*
Years	Team	Apps	(Gls)
2008–2009	Kecskemét	3	(0)
2010–2011	Petrovac	39	(0)
2011–2012	ŁKS Łódź	20	(0)
2012	Etar 1924	4	(0)
2013	Rabat Ajax	22	(0)
2014–2016	Zeta	16	(0)
2016	Zvijezda 09		
2017	Lovćen		
2017–2018	Iskra	2	(0)
2018–	Dečić	86	(0)
2021–2022	→ Zeta (loan)	11	(0)

International career
2011	Montenegro U21	3	(0)
- * Club domestic league appearances and goals as of 29 May 2024

Pavle Velimirović (Cyrillic: Павле Велимировић; born 11 April 1990) is a Montenegrin professional footballer who plays as a goalkeeper for Dečić.

== Playing career ==
He started playing as a youngster in Montenegro in a local club Crvena Stijena where he was spotted by Serbian Partizan who brought him to play for their youth team.

In 2008, he signed with Hungarian club Kecskemét where he made his senior debut. The club was newly promoted to the top league, and he finished the season with three appearances in the Nemzeti Bajnokság I.

In summer 2009 he returned to Montenegro and signed with Petrovac playing in the Montenegrin First League where he played during the following two seasons making 35 league appearances.

In July 2011, he joined Polish Ekstraklasa club ŁKS Łódź on a one-year contract.

In July 2013, he joined Maltese club Rabat Ajax.
