= József Balázs (footballer) =

Hungarian footballer

Personal information
- Full name: József Balázs
- Date of birth: 9 May 1984 (age 42)
- Place of birth: Orosháza, Hungary
- Height: 1.75 m (5 ft 9 in)
- Position: Forward

Youth career
- 1998–2002: Mezőkovácsházi TE

Senior career*
Years	Team	Apps	(Gls)
2002–2003	Mezőkovácsházi TE		
2003–2005	Gyulai Termál		
2005–2007	Orosháza	41	(11)
2007	Tatabánya	1	(0)
2007–2009	Kecskemét	32	(8)
2009	→ Békéscsaba (loan)	10	(6)
2009–2013	Békéscsaba	80	(24)
2013	Orosháza	9	(0)
2013–2015	Mezőkovácsházi TE	24	(8)
2015	Orosháza	4	(0)
2015–2018	Mezőkovácsházi TE	37	(10)
- * Club domestic league appearances and goals

József Balázs (born 9 May 1984 in Orosháza) is a retired Hungarian football player.
