= Szabolcs Schindler =

Hungarian footballer and coach

Personal information
- Date of birth: 26 October 1974 (age 52)
- Place of birth: Kecel, Hungary
- Height: 1.76 m (5 ft 9 in)
- Position: Defender

Youth career
- 1992–1996: Vasas

Senior career*
| Years | Team | Apps | (Gls) |
| 1996–1999 | Fehérvár | 82 | (0) |
| 1999–2000 | Gázszer | 16 | (2) |
| 2000–2001 | MTK | 30 | (1) |
| 2001–2003 | Vasas | 43 | (1) |
| 2003–2005 | Békéscsaba | 50 | (1) |
| 2005–2006 | Pécs | 42 | (3) |
| 2006–2008 | Honvéd | 40 | (1) |
| 2008–2010 | Kecskemét | 57 | (0) |
| 2010 | Szolnok | 10 | (0) |

Managerial career
- 2017–2018: Dorog
- 2018–2019: Ajka
- 2019–2020: Békéscsaba
- 2020–2021: Vasas
- 2021–2022: Békéscsaba
- * Club domestic league appearances and goals

Szabolcs Schindler (born 26 October 1974) is a Hungarian football coach and a former player. Schindler has played nearly 300 matches in the Nemzeti Bajnokság I for clubs such as Videoton FC, MTK Hungária FC, Vasas SC and Budapest Honvéd FC.
