= Ladislav Rybánsky =

Slovak footballer

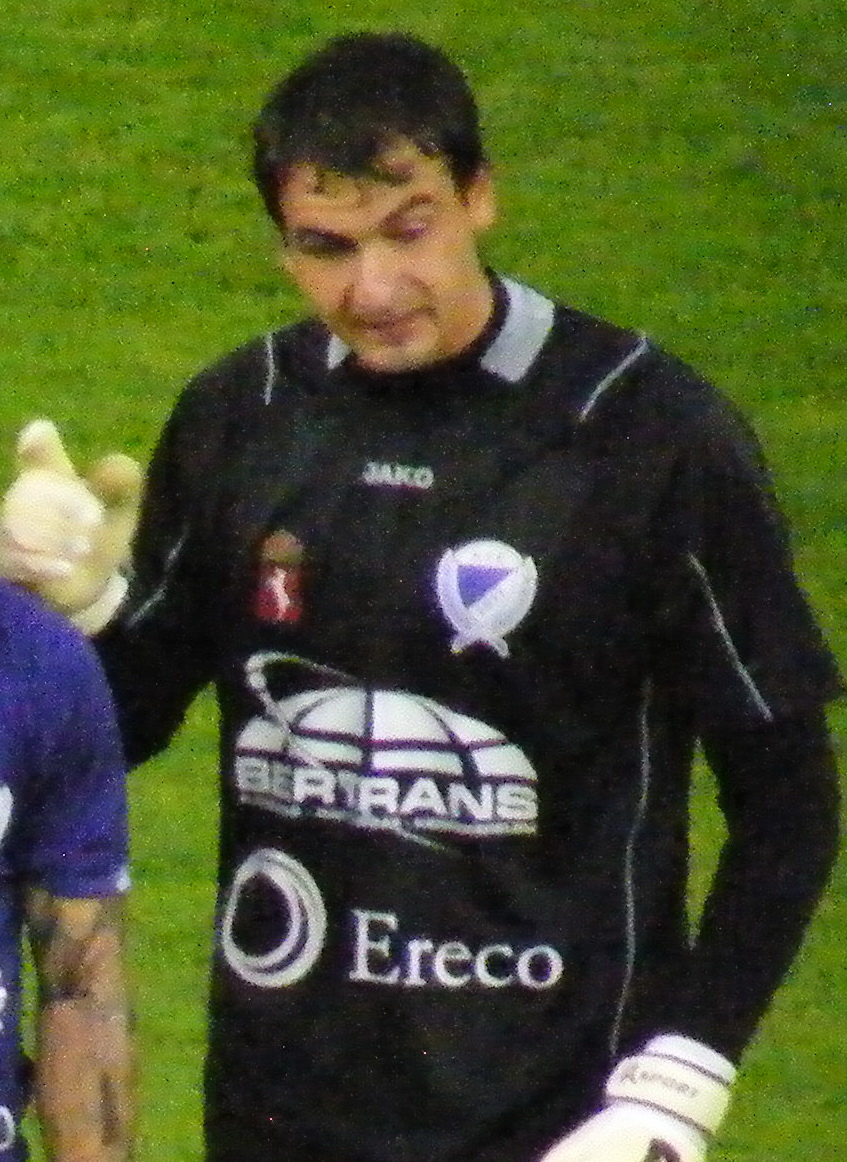

Personal information
- Full name: Ladislav Rybánsky
- Date of birth: 19 December 1984 (age 41)
- Place of birth: Šaľa, Czechoslovakia
- Height: 1.93 m (6 ft 4 in)
- Position: Goalkeeper

Team information
- Current team: Slovan Duslo Šaľa

Youth career
- 2001–2006: Spartak Trnava

Senior career*
Years	Team	Apps	(Gls)
2006–2010	Spartak Trnava	43	(0)
2006–2007	→ Nové Zámky (loan)	28	(0)
2010–2011	Kecskemét	28	(0)
2012	Siófok	9	(0)
2012–2013	Diósgyőr	26	(0)
2013–2014	Podbeskidzie	12	(0)
2014	Podbeskidzie II	2	(0)
2014	Nové Zámky	16	(0)
2015	Sereď	14	(0)
2015–2018	Mezőkövesd	0	(0)
2016	→ Kisvárda (loan)	7	(0)
2016–2018	→ Békéscsaba (loan)	68	(0)
2018–2020	Békéscsaba	51	(0)
2020–2021	FK Csíkszereda	16	(0)
2022–2024	TJ Progres Selice		
2024–	Slovan Duslo Šaľa		
- * Club domestic league appearances and goals as of 11:55, 19 December 2024 (UTC)

Ladislav Rybánsky (born 19 December 1984) is a Slovak professional footballer who plays as a goalkeeper for Slovan Duslo Šaľa.

== Career ==
Rybánsky began his career 2001 with Spartak Trnava. In 2005, he was loaned to FK Nove Zamky. After one season with FK Nove Zamky, he returned to FC Spartak Trnava, where he started his professional career in the Corgoň Liga in 2008. On 8 July 2010, Rybánsky signed a three-year contract with Kecskeméti TE.

== Honours ==
Kecskeméti TE

- Hungarian Cup: 2010–11
