= Tibor Montvai =

Hungarian footballer

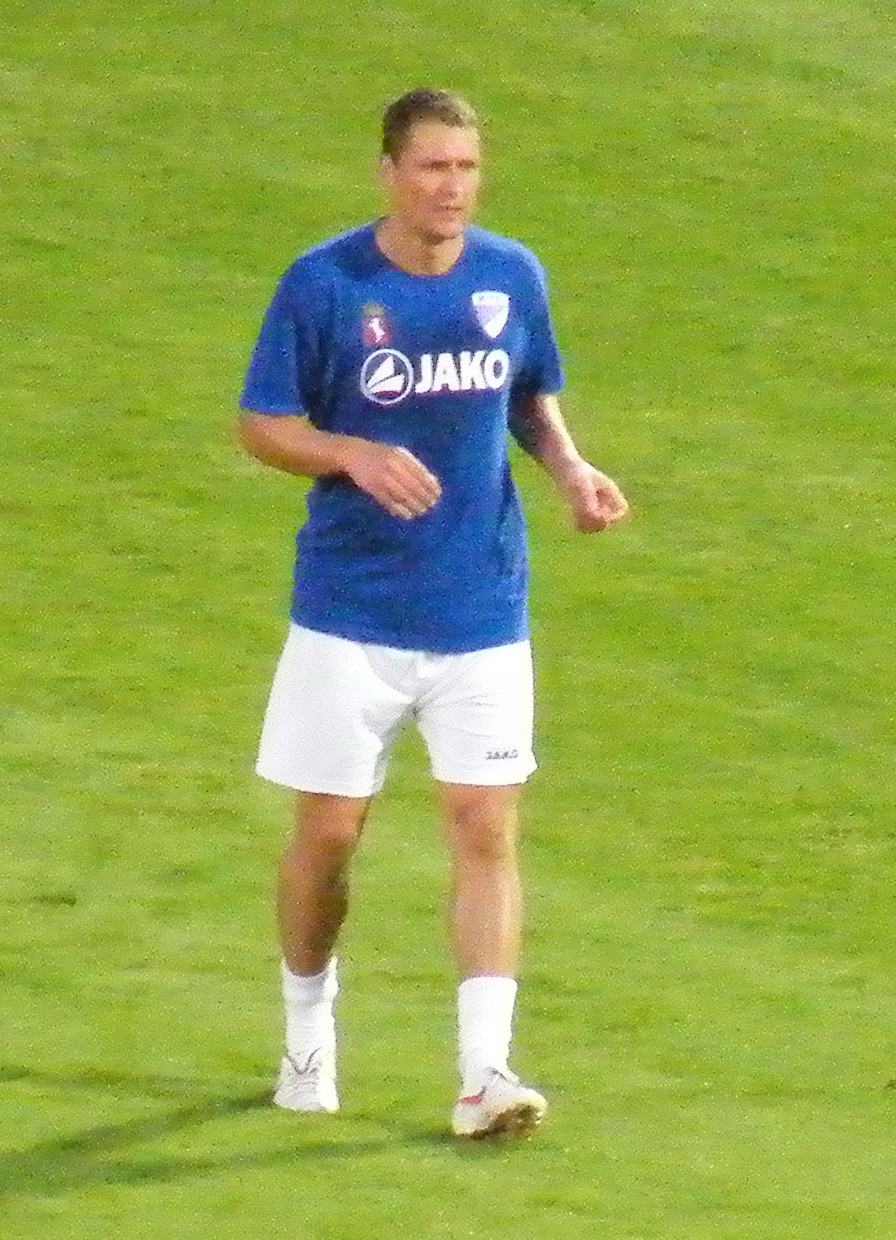

Personal information
- Full name: Tibor Montvai
- Date of birth: 23 November 1978 (age 47)
- Place of birth: Eger, Hungary
- Height: 1.87 m (6 ft 2 in)
- Position: Striker

Team information
- Current team: Nyíregyháza Spartacus
- Number: 7

Youth career
- 1992–1996: Egri FC

Senior career*
Years	Team	Apps	(Gls)
1996–2001	Egri FC	46	(23)
2001–2002	BFC Siófok	?	(?)
2002–2003	Diósgyőri VTK	35	(5)
2003–2005	Pécsi Mecsek FC	44	(12)
2005–2006	Zalaegerszegi TE	22	(4)
2006–2007	Paksi SE	14	(0)
2007–2008	Nyíregyháza Spartacus	14	(2)
2008–2010	Kecskeméti TE	69	(38)
2010–2012	Paksi SE	32	(10)
2012–	Nyíregyháza Spartacus	73	(30)
- * Club domestic league appearances and goals as of 2 August 2015

Tibor Montvai (born 23 November 1978) is a Hungarian football player who currently plays for Nyíregyháza Spartacus.
