= Christian Bodiong Ebala =

Cameroonian footballer (born 1988)

Christian Ebala
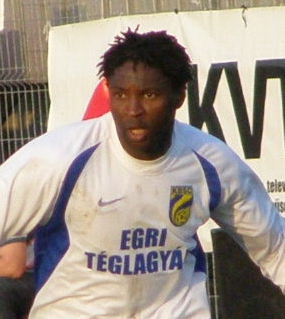

Personal information
- Full name: Christian Bodiong Ebala
- Date of birth: March 17, 1988 (age 38)
- Place of birth: Yaoundé, Cameroon
- Height: 1.85 m (6 ft 1 in)
- Position: Defensive midfielder

Senior career*
Years	Team	Apps	(Gls)
2006–2007	Mefou	30	(?)
2007–2008	Diósgyőr	9	(1)
2008–2009	Újpest	4	(1)
2009–2010	Bőcs	5	(0)
2010	Kazincbarcika	13	(0)
2010–2013	Kecskemét	33	(2)
2012	→ Astana (loan)	16	(0)
- * Club domestic league appearances and goals as of 20 October 2013

Christian Bodiong Ebala (born March 17, 1988) is a Cameroonian footballer whose last known club was Kecskeméti TE.

== Career ==
In July 2010 Ebala signed a three-year contract, with the option of two more, with Kecskeméti TE. In March 2012 Ebala, along with teammate Foxi Kéthévoama, joined Kazakhstan Premier League side FC Astana on a season-long loan deal.
