= Zsolt Koncz =

Hungarian footballer

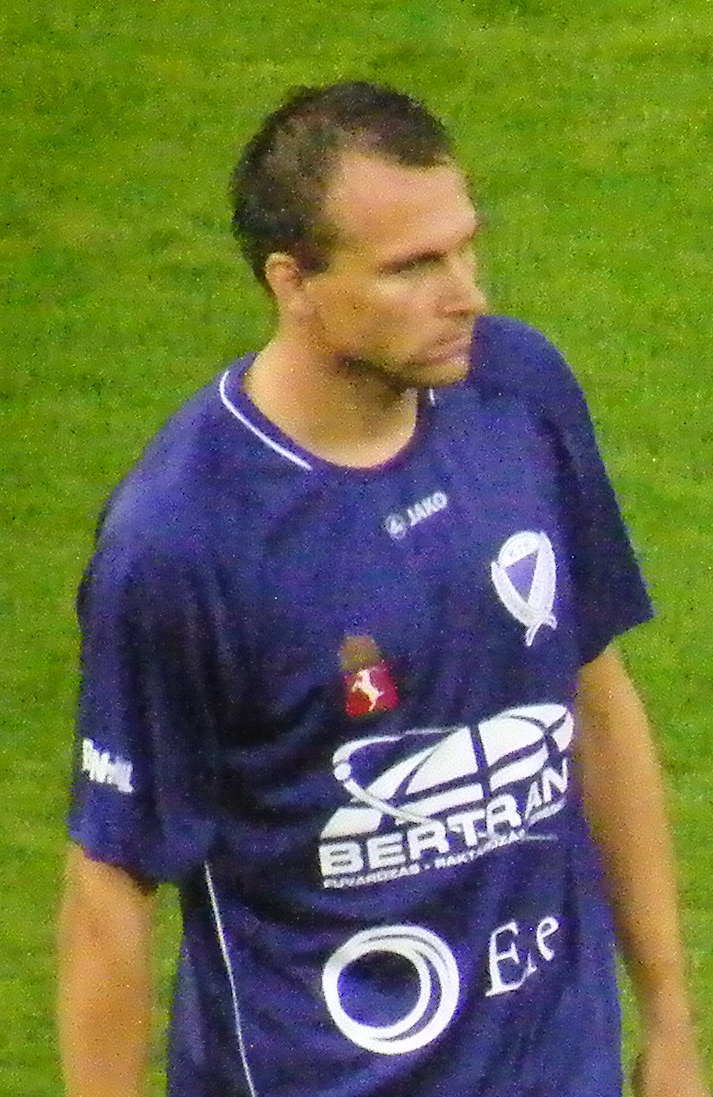

Personal information
- Full name: Zsolt Koncz
- Date of birth: 18 September 1977 (age 49)
- Place of birth: Szentes, Hungary
- Height: 1.85 m (6 ft 1 in)
- Position: Midfielder

Team information
- Current team: Cegléd
- Number: 15

Youth career
- 1994–1996: Szeged
- 1996–1998: Győr

Senior career*
Years	Team	Apps	(Gls)
1998–2000	Kunszentmárton TE	3	(0)
2000–2001	Csongrád	42	(7)
2001–2005	Szentes	30	(21)
2005–2008	Orosháza	65	(21)
2008–2011	Kecskemét	54	(4)
2011–	Cegléd	97	(28)
- * Club domestic league appearances and goals as of 1 June 2014

Zsolt Koncz (born 18 September 1977 in Szentes) is a Hungarian football player who currently plays for Ceglédi VSE.
