= Norbert Némedi =

Hungarian footballer

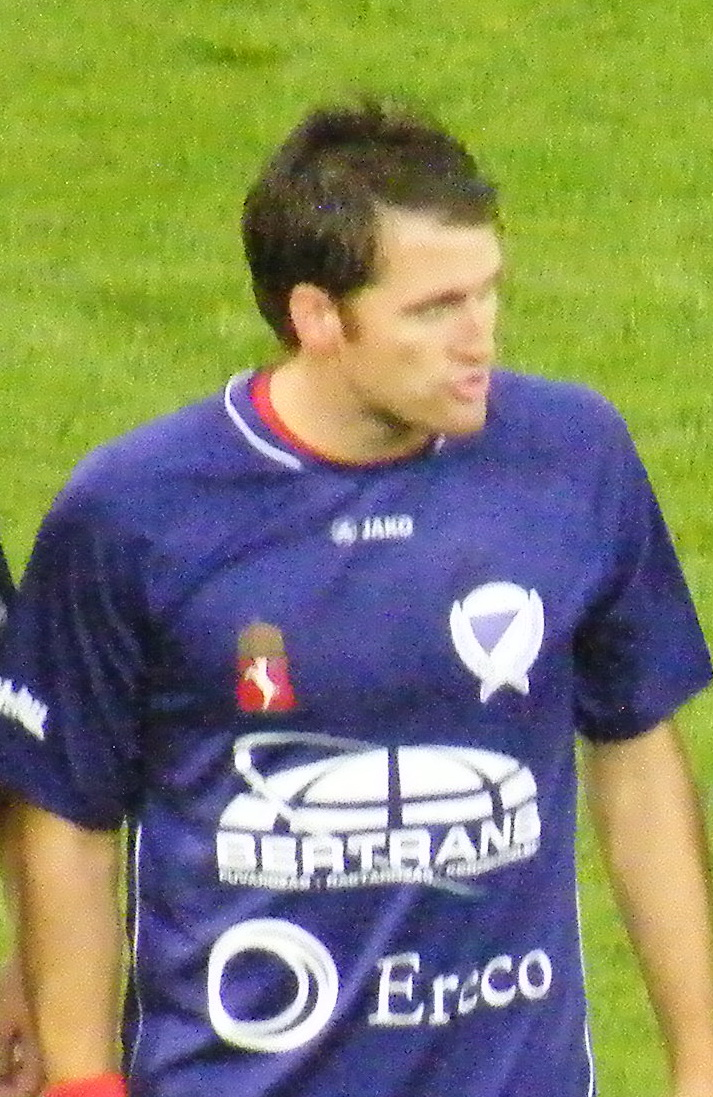

Personal information
- Full name: Norbert Némedi
- Date of birth: 1 June 1977 (age 49)
- Place of birth: Kecskemét, Hungary
- Height: 1.81 m (5 ft 11 in)
- Position: Midfielder

Team information
- Current team: Kecskeméti TE
- Number: 12

Youth career
- Kecskeméti TE

Senior career*
Years	Team	Apps	(Gls)
1996–1997	Kecskeméti TE	20	(0)
1997–1998	Egri FC	?	(?)
1998–1999	Újpest FC	3	(0)
2000–2001	Szolnoki MÁV FC	17	(2)
2001–2003	FC Fehérvár	22	(0)
2003–2004	Rákospalotai EAC	?	(?)
2004–2006	Nyíregyháza Spartacus	13	(0)
2006–	Kecskeméti TE	129	(27)
- * Club domestic league appearances and goals as of 20 November 2010

Norbert Némedi (born 1 June 1977 in Kecskemét) is a Hungarian football player who currently plays for Kecskeméti TE.
