= Goran Grkinić =

Serbian footballer

Personal information
- Full name: Goran Grkinić
- Date of birth: 1 June 1979 (age 47)
- Place of birth: Zemun, SFR Yugoslavia
- Height: 1.85 m (6 ft 1 in)
- Position: Defender

Senior career*
Years	Team	Apps	(Gls)
1997–2005	Zemun	135	(2)
1997–1998	→ Jedinstvo Paraćin (loan)	34	(3)
2005–2008	Ethnikos Achna	45	(1)
2008–2009	Kecskeméti TE	11	(0)
2009	Senica	0	(0)
2010	Zemun	5	(0)
- * Club domestic league appearances and goals

Goran Grkinić (Serbian Cyrillic: Горан Гркинић; born 1 June 1979) is a Serbian football defender who spent most of his career with Zemun.

By September 2014 he has been the sports director of Serbian SuperLiga club Voždovac.
