= Csaba Csordás =

Hungarian footballer

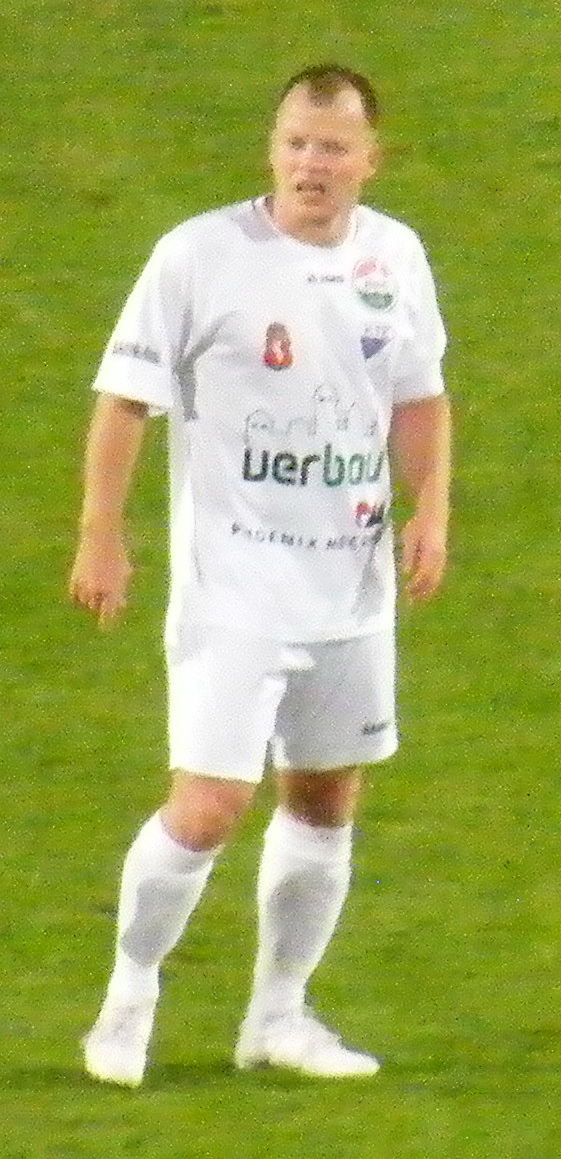

Personal information
- Full name: Csaba Csordás
- Date of birth: 9 August 1977 (age 49)
- Place of birth: Kecskemét, Hungary
- Height: 1.68 m (5 ft 6 in)
- Position: Striker

Team information
- Current team: ASK Kohfidisch

Senior career*
Years	Team	Apps	(Gls)
1994–1995	Kecskeméti TE	27	(7)
1995–1998	BVSC Budapest	50	(4)
1998–1999	MTK Hungária FC	9	(0)
1999–2000	Újpest FC	2	(0)
2000–2002	Celldömölki VSE	?	(?)
2002–2004	BFC Siófok	21	(7)
2004–2005	Videoton FC	9	(1)
2005–2006	FC Sopron	14	(0)
2006	Vasas SC	15	(1)
2006–2011	Kecskeméti TE	126	(46)
2011	BFC Siófok	12	(1)
2011–2012	Soproni VSE	15	(0)
2012–	ASK Kohfidisch		

International career
1996–1997	Hungary U-19	7	(1)
1997	Hungary U-20	1	(1)
1998–1999	Hungary U-21	1	(0)
- * Club domestic league appearances and goals as of 26 November 2011

Csaba Csordás (born 9 August 1977 in Kecskemét) is a Hungarian football player who currently plays for ASK Kohfidisch.

== Kecskeméti TE ==
Since 12 August 2006, Csaba Csordás has played in the Nemzeti Bajnokság II for Kecskeméti TE. In the 2007/08 season, he was a member of the Kecskeméti TE team that won the second division championship.

== Honours ==
- Nemzeti Bajnokság I: Winner 1999
- Hungarian Second Division: Winner 2008
- FIFA World Youth Championship: 1st Round 1997
