= István Bagi =

Hungarian footballer

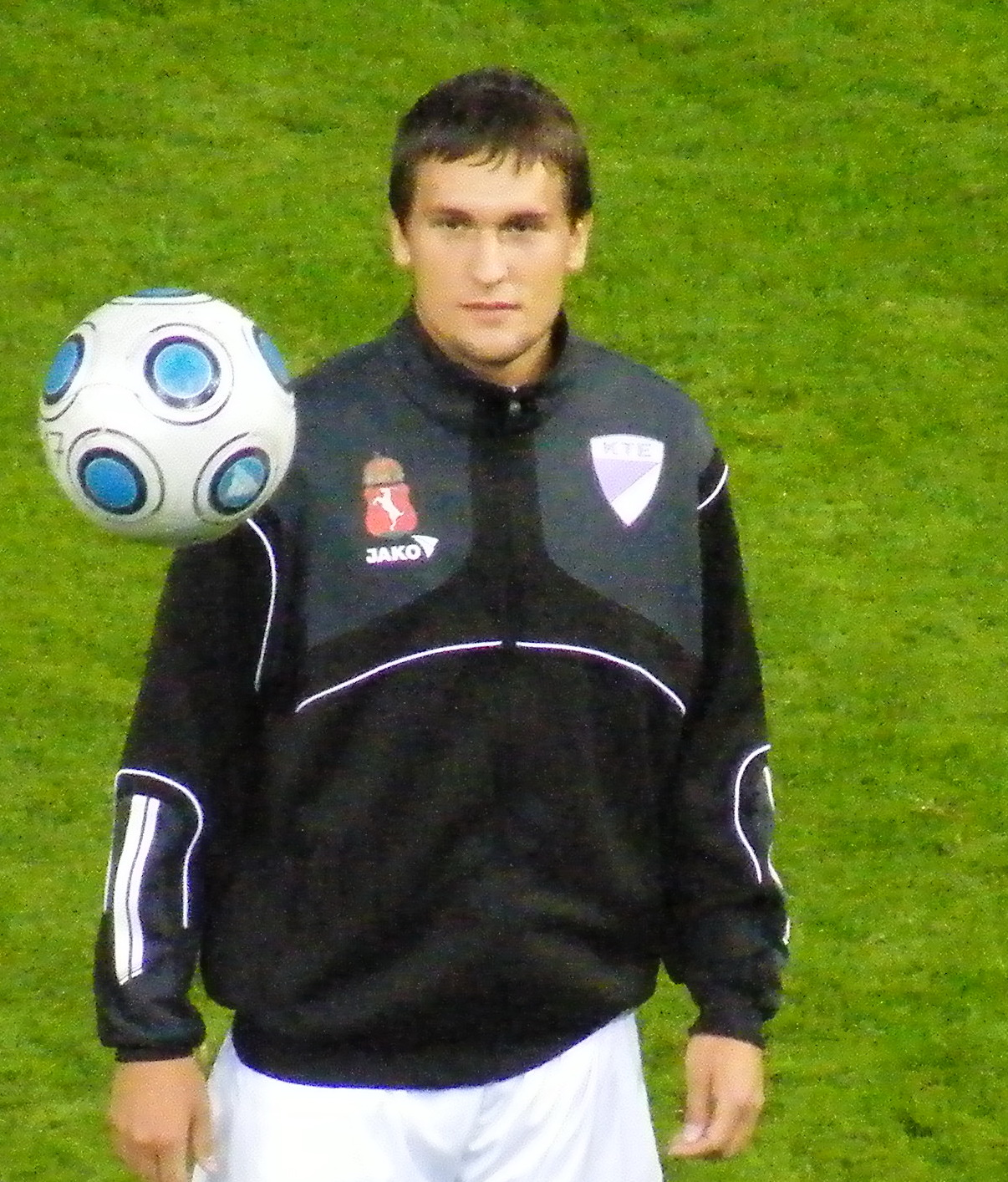

Personal information
- Date of birth: 23 March 1989 (age 37)
- Place of birth: Csongrád, Hungary
- Height: 1.85 m (6 ft 1 in)
- Position: Defender

Team information
- Current team: SC Oberpullendorf

Senior career*
Years	Team	Apps	(Gls)
2004–2005	Csongrádi TSE	10	(0)
2005–2012	Kecskemét	38	(0)
2006–2008	→ Csongrádi TSE (loan)	38	(4)
2011–2012	→ Mezőkövesd (loan)	28	(1)
2012–2014	Mezőkövesd	42	(0)
2014–2017	Békéscsaba	74	(7)
2016	→ Kisvárda (loan)	14	(3)
2017–2022	Győri ETO	143	(11)
2022	Bruck/Leitha	13	(1)
2023–	SC Oberpullendorf	0	(0)
- * Club domestic league appearances and goals as of 12 November 2022

István Bagi (born 23 March 1989) is a Hungarian football player who plays for Austrian club SC Oberpullendorf.
