= Ádám Hegedűs =

Hungarian footballer

Personal information
- Full name: Ádám Hegedűs
- Date of birth: 29 March 1988 (age 38)
- Place of birth: Kecskemét, Hungary
- Height: 1.79 m (5 ft 10 1/2 in)
- Position: Striker

Team information
- Current team: Kecskeméti TE
- Number: 19

Youth career
- 2003: Budapest Honvéd FC
- 2003: Goldball '94 FC
- 2003–2006: Szent István SE

Senior career*
| Years | Team | Apps | (Gls) |
| 2006– | Kecskeméti TE | 31 | (4) |
| 2007–2008 | → Virtus Casarano (loan) | ? | (?) |
| 2011 | → Mezőkövesd-Zsóry SE (loan) | 1 | (0) |
- * Club domestic league appearances and goals as of 27 May 2012

Ádám Hegedűs (born 29 March 1988) is a Hungarian football player who currently plays for Kecskeméti TE.
