= Lajos Bertus =

Hungarian football player

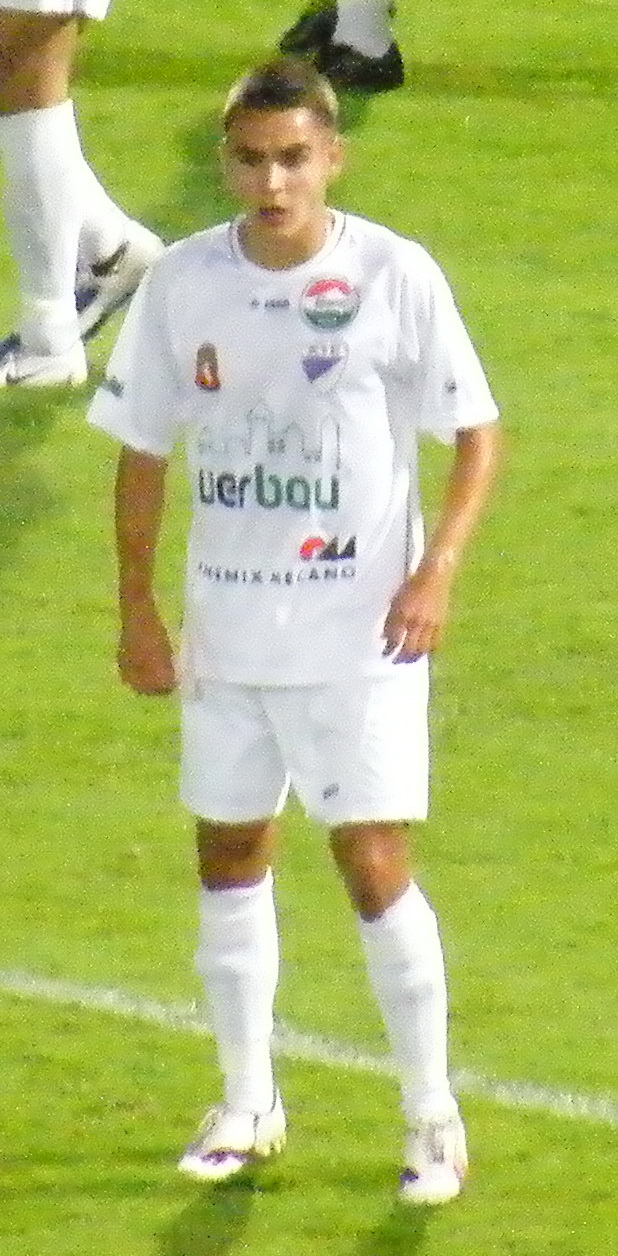

Personal information
- Date of birth: 26 September 1990 (age 36)
- Place of birth: Kecskemét, Hungary
- Height: 1.74 m (5 ft 8 1/2 in)
- Position: Midfielder

Team information
- Current team: Mezőkövesd
- Number: 26

Youth career
- 2003–2007: Kecskemét

Senior career*
Years	Team	Apps	(Gls)
2007–2013	Kecskemét	58	(6)
2013–2014	Puskás Akadémia	7	(0)
2014–2019	Paks	145	(14)
2019–2020	Mezőkövesd	15	(0)
2020–2021	Paks	45	(0)
2021–2023	Diósgyőr	54	(1)
2023–2024	Tiszakécske	27	(1)
2024	Tatabánya	9	(0)
2025–	Mezőkövesd	43	(2)

International career^{‡}
2011	Hungary U-21	2	(0)
- * Club domestic league appearances and goals as of 31 May 2026 ‡ National team caps and goals as of 8 October 2011

Lajos Bertus (born 26 September 1990) is a Hungarian football player who plays for Mezőkövesd.

== Career statistics ==
Appearances and goals by club, season and competition
Club	Season	League			Cup		League Cup		Europe		Total	
Club	Season	Division	Apps	Goals	Apps	Goals	Apps	Goals	Apps	Goals	Apps	Goals
Kecskemét
Kecskemét	2008–09	Nemzeti Bajnokság I	1	0	0	0	2	0	—		3	0
Kecskemét	2009–10	Nemzeti Bajnokság I	10	1	4	0	9	0	—		23	1
Kecskemét	2010–11	Nemzeti Bajnokság I	16	1	6	0	6	0	—		28	1
Kecskemét	2011–12	Nemzeti Bajnokság I	23	3	2	0	6	1	1	0	32	4
Kecskemét	2012–13	Nemzeti Bajnokság I	8	1	1	0	4	0	—		13	1
Kecskemét	Total		58	6	13	0	27	1	1	0	99	7
Puskás Akadémia	2013–14	Nemzeti Bajnokság I	7	0	2	0	9	0	—		18	0
Paks
Paks	2014–15	Nemzeti Bajnokság I	31	2	0	0	4	0	—		35	2
Paks	2015–16	Nemzeti Bajnokság I	33	3	1	0	—		—		34	2
Paks	2016–17	Nemzeti Bajnokság I	32	2	2	0	—		—		34	2
Paks	2017–18	Nemzeti Bajnokság I	31	6	2	0	—		—		33	6
Paks	2018–19	Nemzeti Bajnokság I	18	1	2	1	—		—		20	2
Paks	2019–20	Nemzeti Bajnokság I	15	0	2	0	—		—		17	0
Paks	2020–21	Nemzeti Bajnokság I	29	0	1	0	—		—		30	0
Paks	2021–22	Nemzeti Bajnokság I	1	0	0	0	—		—		1	0
Paks	Total		190	14	10	1	4	0	0	0	204	15
Mezőkövesd
Mezőkövesd	2018–19	Nemzeti Bajnokság I	12	0	1	0	—		—		13	0
Mezőkövesd	2019–20	Nemzeti Bajnokság I	3	0	3	1	—		—		6	1
Mezőkövesd	Total		15	0	4	1	0	0	0	0	19	1
Career total			270	20	29	2	40	1	1	0	340	23

Updated to games played as of 15 May 2021.
