= Vladan Savić =

Montenegrin footballer

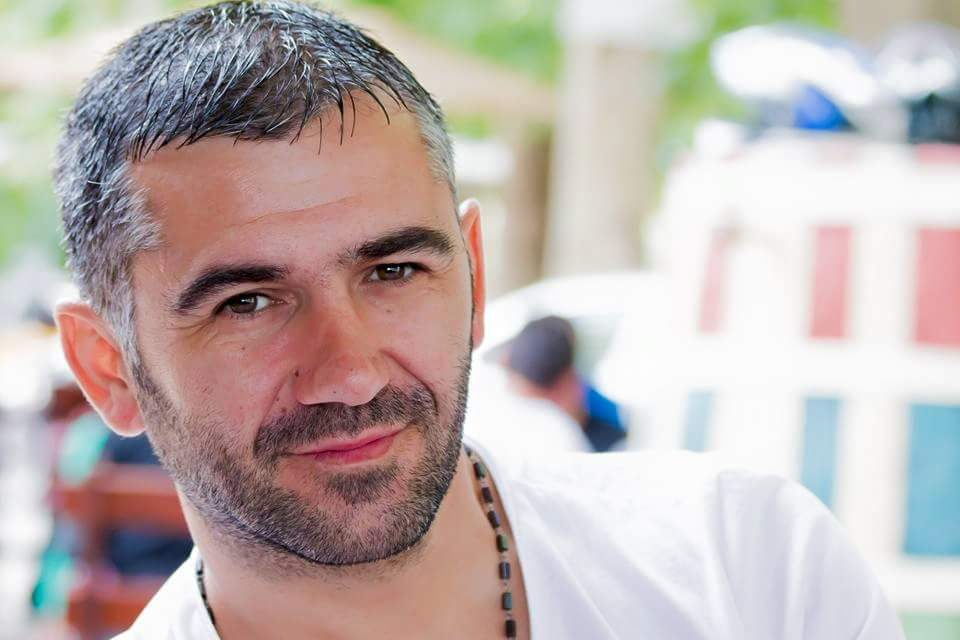

Personal information
- Full name: Vladan Savić
- Date of birth: 26 July 1979 (age 47)
- Place of birth: Ivangrad, SFR Yugoslavia
- Height: 1.86 m (6 ft 1 in)
- Position: Midfielder

Youth career
- 1995: Berane

Senior career*
Years	Team	Apps	(Gls)
1995–1998	Berane	27	(9)
1998–2000	Budućnost Podgorica	0	(0)
2000–2003	Mladost Apatin	33+	(4+)
2003–2006	Spartak Subotica		
2006–2007	Voždovac	21	(1)
2007–2015	Kecskemét	179	(17)
2015–2016	Berane	0	(0)
- * Club domestic league appearances and goals

Vladan Savić (Cyrillic: Владан Савић; born 26 July 1979) is a Montenegrin retired footballer.

== Club career ==
He played for hometown club FK Berane as well as for Kecskeméti TE, FK Budućnost Podgorica, FK Mladost Apatin, FK Spartak Subotica and FK Voždovac.
