= Aleksandar Alempijević =

Serbian footballer

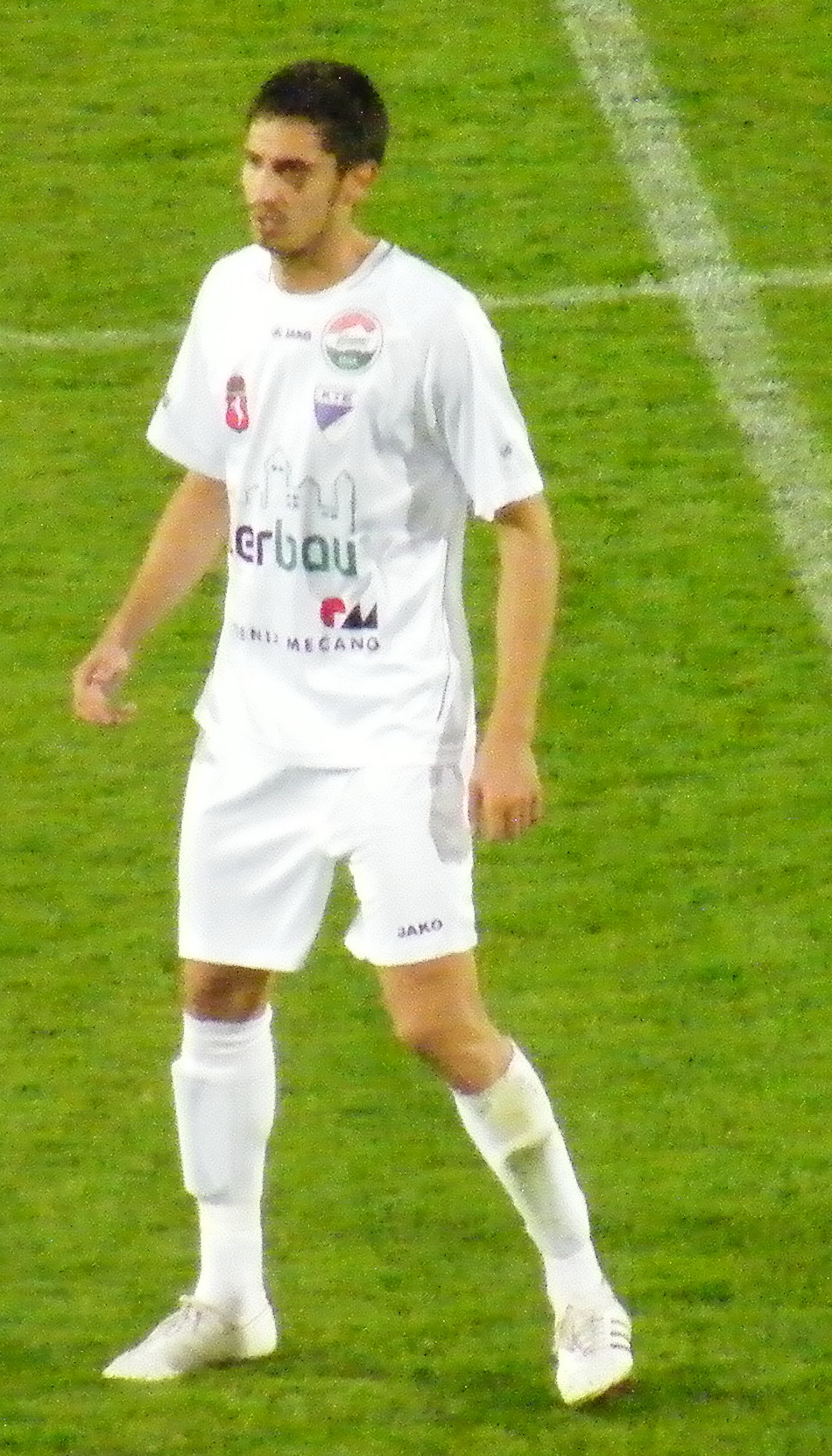

Personal information
- Full name: Aleksandar Alempijević
- Date of birth: July 25, 1988 (age 38)
- Place of birth: Čačak, SFR Yugoslavia
- Height: 1.89 m (6 ft 2 1/2 in)
- Position: Defensive midfielder

Youth career
- 2002–2006: Partizan

Senior career*
Years	Team	Apps	(Gls)
2006–2008	Partizan	0	(0)
2006–2008	→ Teleoptik (loan)	20	(2)
2008–2012	Kecskemét	67	(5)
2012–2013	Ferencváros	18	(2)
2012–2013	Ferencváros II	2	(0)
2013	Javor Ivanjica	10	(0)
2014	Olmaliq	11	(3)
2014	OFK Beograd	8	(0)
2015	Čukarički	1	(0)
2015–2016	Mladost Lučani	5	(0)
2016	Bunyodkor	20	(1)
2017	Sloboda Užice	6	(0)
2018–2019	Aspropyrgos	0	(0)
- * Club domestic league appearances and goals as of 18 December 2017

Aleksandar Alempijević (Serbian Cyrillic: Александар Aлeмпиjeвић, born July 25, 1988) is a Serbian football player who plays as a defensive midfielder.

== Career ==
Born in Čačak, SR Serbia, SFR Yugoslavia, he started playing with FK Partizan youth team. Between 2006 and 2008 he played 2 seasons with Partizan satellite club FK Teleoptik in Serbian third tier. In 2008, he moved to Hungary and joined Kecskeméti TE where he played the following 4 seasons. In summer 2012 he moved to Ferencvárosi TC. In September 2013, after playing 5 seasons in the Nemzeti Bajnokság I, he returned to Serbia and joined top league side FK Javor Ivanjica.

== Club statistics ==
Club	Season	League		Cup		League Cup		Europe		Total	
Club	Season	Apps	Goals	Apps	Goals	Apps	Goals	Apps	Goals	Apps	Goals
Kecskemét
Kecskemét	2008–09	15	1	5	1	4	1	0	0	24	3
Kecskemét	2009–10	22	1	3	1	6	1	0	0	31	3
Kecskemét	2010–11	17	2	6	3	4	1	0	0	27	6
Kecskemét	2011–12	13	1	0	0	7	1	2	0	22	2
Kecskemét	Total	67	5	14	5	21	4	2	0	104	14
Ferencváros
Ferencváros	2012–13	16	2	0	0	4	0	0	0	20	2
Ferencváros	2013–14	2	0	0	0	0	0	0	0	2	0
Ferencváros	Total	18	2	0	0	4	0	0	0	22	2
Career Total		85	7	14	5	25	4	2	0	126	16

Updated to games played as of 4 August 2013.

== Honours ==
Ferencváros

- Hungarian League Cup (1): 2012–13

Čukarički

- Serbian Cup (1): 2014–15

== External sources ==
- Aleksandar Alempijević at HLSZ
- Aleksandar Alempijević at Soccerway.com
- Aleksandar Alempijević at WorldFootball.net
- Aleksandar Alempijević at Soccerbase.com
- Aleksandar Alempijević at FBref.com
- Aleksandar Alempijević at Kicker (in German)
