= Balázs Koszó =

Hungarian footballer

Personal information
- Full name: Tibor Balázs Koszó
- Date of birth: 20 March 1988 (age 38)
- Place of birth: Kecskemét, Hungary
- Height: 1.84 m (6 ft 0 in)
- Position: Defender

Team information
- Current team: Balassagyarmat

Youth career
- 2002–2004: Kecskemét
- 2004–2007: Ferencváros

Senior career*
Years	Team	Apps	(Gls)
2007–2014	Kecskemét	80	(2)
2009	→ Bőcs (loan)	13	(0)
2010–2011	→ SZTK (loan)	6	(0)
2014–2016	Békéscsaba	42	(2)
2015	→ Dunaújváros (loan)	10	(1)
2016–2017	Mosonmagyaróvár	37	(1)
2017–2018	Zalaegerszeg	18	(0)
2018–2019	Győri ETO	16	(1)
2019–2020	Szeged-Csanád	0	(0)
2020–2021	BKV Előre	14	(0)
2021	Kecskemét	16	(1)
2021–	Balassagyarmat	30	(0)
- * Club domestic league appearances and goals as of 4 May 2022

Balázs Koszó (born 20 March 1988) is a Hungarian football player who plays for Balassagyarmat.
