= István Farkas (footballer) =

Hungarian footballer

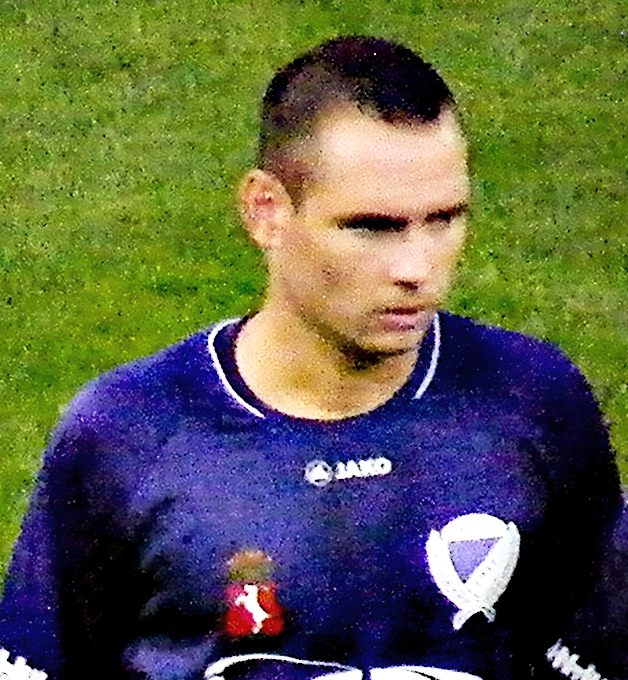

Personal information
- Full name: István Farkas
- Date of birth: 16 June 1984 (age 42)
- Place of birth: Kecskemét, Hungary
- Height: 1.55 m (5 ft 1 in)
- Position: Midfielder

Team information
- Current team: Kecskeméti (coach)

Youth career
- 1998–2003: Kecskemét

Senior career*
Years	Team	Apps	(Gls)
2003–2013	Kecskemét	127	(13)
2011–2013	→ Cegléd (loan)	50	(5)
2013–2015	Cegléd	95	(11)
2015–2016	Tiszakécske		
2016–2019	Kecskeméti		
- * Club domestic league appearances and goals as of 17:45, 7 September 2019 (UTC)

István Farkas (born 16 June 1984 in Kecskemét) is a Hungarian football player.

== Coaching career ==
Farkas decided to retire at the end of the 2018–19 season. Kecskeméti LC announced, that Farkas would stay at the club as a coach.
