= Attila Gyagya =

Romanian footballer

Personal information
- Full name: Attila Lehel Gyagya
- Date of birth: 30 March 1982 (age 44)
- Place of birth: Sighetu Marmaţiei, Romania
- Height: 1.88 m (6 ft 2 in)
- Position: Defender

Team information
- Current team: Kecskemét
- Number: 15

Youth career
- FC Steaua București

Senior career*
Years	Team	Apps	(Gls)
2004–2005	Szentes	?	(?)
2005–2006	Orosháza	23	(2)
2006–2015	Kecskemét	156	(6)
2013	→ Szolnok (loan)	7	(0)
2015–	Zalaegerszegi TE		
- * Club domestic league appearances and goals as of 3 August 2015

Attila Gyagya (born 30 March 1982 in Sighetu Marmaţiei, Maramureș County) is a Romanian football defender of Hungarian ethnicity. He currently plays for Kecskeméti TE. His former clubs are Szentesi TE and Orosháza FC. His dream is to play in the Hungary national football team
