= Francis Litsingi =

Congolese footballer (born 1986)

Franci Litsingi
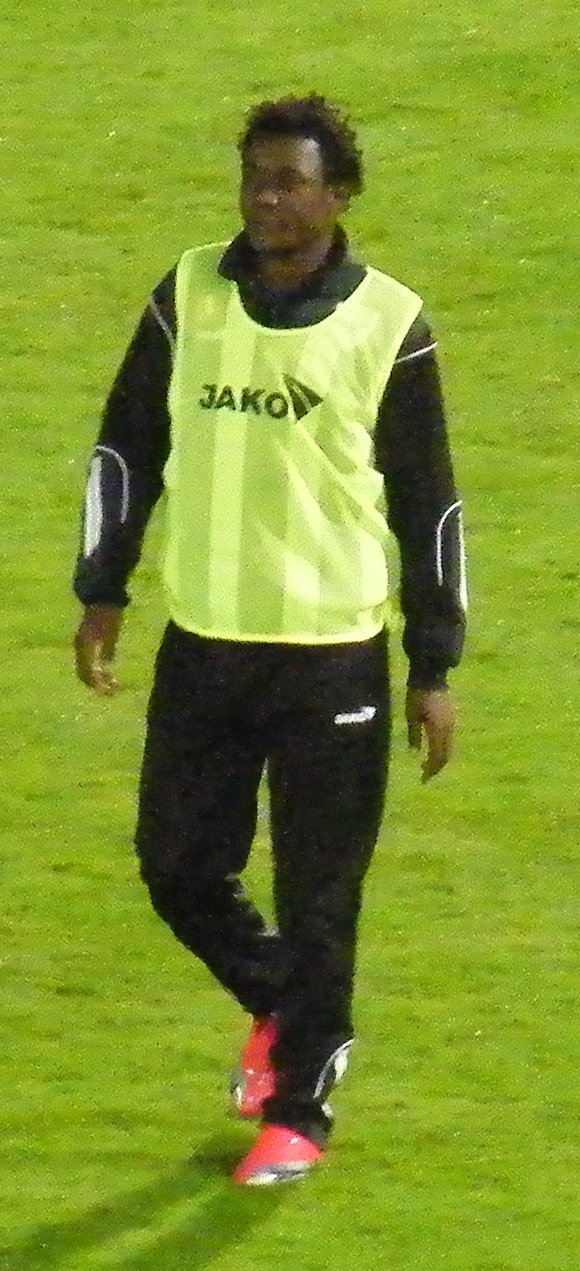

Personal information
- Date of birth: 10 September 1986 (age 40)
- Place of birth: Brazzaville, Republic of the Congo
- Height: 1.83 m (6 ft 0 in)
- Position: Attacking midfielder

Youth career
- 2003–2005: Saint Michel d'Ouenzé

Senior career*
Years	Team	Apps	(Gls)
2005–2006	Saint Michel d'Ouenzé	22	(20)
2006–2008	Cotonsport Garoua	3	(2)
2008–2010	Újpest	0	(0)
2008–2010	→ Kecskemét (loan)	46	(12)
2010–2013	Kecskemét	67	(16)
2013–2015	Teplice	68	(23)
2015–2017	Sparta Prague	5	(1)
2016	→ Gaziantep (loan)	12	(0)
2016–2017	→ Zbrojovka Brno (loan)	11	(0)

International career
2011–2015	Congo	9	(0)
- * Club domestic league appearances and goals

Francis Litsingi (born 10 September 1986) is a Congolese former professional footballer who played as a striker. He played mostly in the Czech First League and the Nemzeti Bajnokság I.

== Club career ==
Listingi started out at Brazzaville club Saint Michel d'Ouenzé where at the age of 19 he enjoyed a very successful season scoring 20 goals in the league and becoming the league's top goalscorer for the 2005–06 season. His success at Saint Michel provoked interest from Cameroon Première Division teams with Cotonsport winning the battle for his services in the 2006–07 season, Litsingi proved to be a great talent scoring 15 goals in the league becoming top goalscorer and numerous goals in the CAF Champions League.

In June 2007 Litsingi trialled with Swiss Super League side Neuchâtel Xamax. He also attracted interest from Hungarian League side Diósgyőri VTK. In August 2007 Litsingi trialled with Iranian giants Persepolis F.C. and were close to inking a one-year deal but the deal fell through.

In 2008, he signed with Újpest FC on a three-year contract in the Hungarian First Division, but Litsingi had loaned to Kecskeméti TE. On 18 January 2013, he signed a three-year contract with Czech first league team FK Teplice.

=== Gaziantep BB ===
On 6 January 2016, it was confirmed that Listingi had signed a 1.5-year contract with Gaziantep BB in Turkey.
