= Vladan Čukić =

Serbian footballer

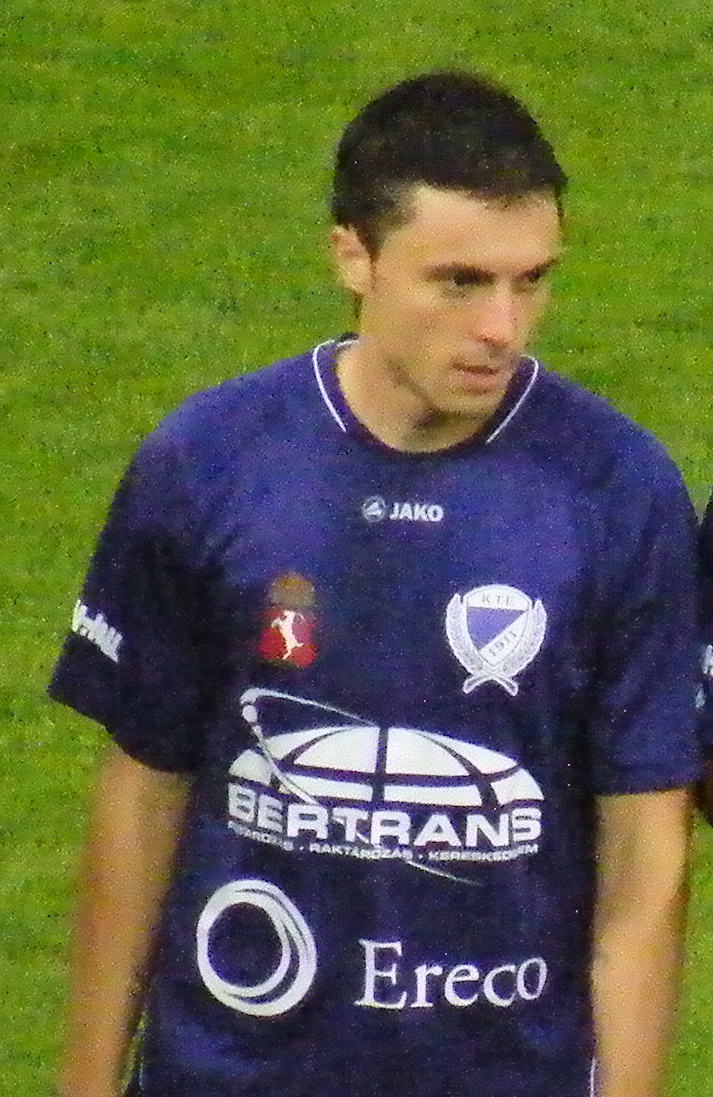

Personal information
- Full name: Vladan Čukić
- Date of birth: 27 June 1980 (age 46)
- Place of birth: Smederevo, SFR Yugoslavia
- Height: 1.81 m (5 ft 11 1/2 in)
- Position: Midfielder

Senior career*
Years	Team	Apps	(Gls)
2001–2004	Železničar Smederevo		
2005–2008	Smederevo	71	(4)
2008–2012	Kecskemét	91	(5)
2009	→ Mezőkövesd (loan)	11	(0)
2012–2017	Ferencváros	93	(3)
- * Club domestic league appearances and goals as of 6 July 2017

Vladan Čukić (Serbian Cyrillic: Владан Чукић; born 27 June 1980) is a Serbian retired footballer.

== Honours ==
Kecskemét

- Hungarian Cup: 2010–11

Ferencváros

- Nemzeti Bajnokság I: 2015–16
- Hungarian Cup: 2014–15, 2015–16, 2016–17
- Hungarian League Cup: 2012–13, 2014–15
- Hungarian Super Cup: 2015, 2016
