= List of Hungarian football transfers summer 2014 =

This is a list of Hungarian football transfers for the 2014 summer transfer window by club. Only transfers of clubs in the OTP Bank Liga will be included.

The summer transfer window opened on 1 June 2014, although a few transfers may have taken place prior to that date. The window closed at midnight on 31 August 2014. Players without a club may join one at any time, either during or in between transfer windows.

== OTP Bank Liga ==
=== Budapest Honvéd ===
In: Note: Flags indicate national team as defined under FIFA eligibility rules; some limited exceptions apply. Players may hold more than one non-FIFA nationality.

No.	Pos.	Nation	Player
1	GK	HUN	András Horváth (from Hatvan)
3	DF	ALB	Kristi Marku (from Honvéd II)
6	MF	ESP	Cristian Portilla (from (United States) Indy Eleven)
15	FW	CIV	Kandia Traoré (from (France) Caen)
21	DF	HUN	János Fejes (loan return from Gyirmót)
66	DF	SRB	Jevrem Kosnić (loan from (Italy) Palermo)
67	DF	ROU	Anatolis Sundas (from Honvéd II)
88	DF	MNE	Marko Vidović (from (Moldova) Tiraspol)
94	MF	HUN	Sebestyén Ihrig-Farkas (from (Italy) Parma)
99	FW	GUI	Souleymane Youla (from (Belgium) Tournai)

Out: Note: Flags indicate national team as defined under FIFA eligibility rules; some limited exceptions apply. Players may hold more than one non-FIFA nationality.

No.	Pos.	Nation	Player
2	DF	HUN	Dávid Bobál (loan to Sopron)
5	DF	HUN	Endre Botka (loan to Kecskemét)
6	DF	HUN	János Kovács (to Siófok)
7	MF	HUN	Richárd Vernes (to (Australia) Central Coast)
9	FW	HUN	Gergely Délczeg (loan to Zalaegerszeg)
9	FW	COL	Edixon Perea
13	DF	HUN	Gyula Csemer (loan to Gyirmót)
14	FW	GHA	Emmanuel Mensah (loan to (Slovakia) Bodva)
16	MF	HUN	Mihály Csábi (loan to Sopron)
16	FW	HUN	Krisztián Nagy (loan to Kozármisleny)
17	FW	HUN	László Erdélyi (loan to Sopron)
18	MF	HUN	Attila Lőrinczy (loan to Békéscsaba)
23	FW	HUN	Bence Daru (loan to Siófok)
23	FW	ITA	Emanuele Testardi (loan return to Sampdoria)
24	MF	MLI	Drissa Diarra (to (Switzerland) Chiasso)
25	DF	CRO	Ivan Lovrić (to Kecskemét)
28	FW	ITA	Emiliano Bonazzoli (to (Italy) Este)
29	FW	HUN	Richárd Kozma (loan to Siófok)
31	GK	HUN	Márton Czuczi (loan to Békéscsaba)
32	DF	HUN	Máté Varga (loan to Cigánd)
33	MF	SRB	Boris Živanović (to Nyíregyháza)
34	GK	HUN	Norbert Szemerédi (loan to Paks)
37	FW	ITA	Arturo Lupoli (loan return to (Italy) Varese)
46	DF	HUN	Kristóf Polyák (to Zalaegerszeg)
92	FW	HUN	Roland Vólent (loan to Békéscsaba)
—	FW	SRB	Nikola Pantović (loan to Mezőkövesd)

=== Debrecen ===
In: Note: Flags indicate national team as defined under FIFA eligibility rules; some limited exceptions apply. Players may hold more than one non-FIFA nationality.

No.	Pos.	Nation	Player
1	GK	MNE	Vukašin Poleksić (loan return from Kecskemét)
1	GK	HUN	Balázs Slakta (from Debrecen U-19)
2	DF	HUN	István Szűcs (loan return from Létavértes)
33	MF	HUN	József Varga (loan return from (England) Middlesbrough)
37	MF	BRA	Lucas (loan return from Békéscsaba)
60	FW	HUN	Péter Pölöskei (loan return from Pécs)
66	FW	HUN	Márk Szécsi (loan return from Kecskemét)
77	MF	BIH	Aleksandar Jovanović (from Ferencváros)
91	FW	HUN	Ádám Balajti (loan return from Mezőkövesd)

Out: Note: Flags indicate national team as defined under FIFA eligibility rules; some limited exceptions apply. Players may hold more than one non-FIFA nationality.

No.	Pos.	Nation	Player
1	GK	MNE	Vukašin Poleksić (to Pécs)
4	MF	CIV	Joël Damahou
5	DF	HUN	András Burics (loan to Cegléd)
16	DF	HUN	Martin Króner (loan to Zalaegerszeg)
17	DF	HUN	Csaba Szatmári (loan to Balmazújváros)
22	DF	HUN	Csaba Bernáth (retired)
23	FW	HUN	Ádám Kovács (loan to Sopron)
28	DF	HUN	Zoltán Nagy (loan to Nyíregyháza)
29	MF	HUN	István Spitzmüller (to Nyítegyháza)
36	MF	HUN	Dávid Sigér (loan to Balmazújváros)
37	MF	BRA	Lucas (to (Slovakia) Bodva)
60	FW	HUN	Péter Pölöskei (to Pécs)
66	FW	HUN	Márk Szécsi (to Nyíregyháza)
91	FW	HUN	Ádám Balajti (to Mezőkövesd)

=== Diósgyőr ===
In: Note: Flags indicate national team as defined under FIFA eligibility rules; some limited exceptions apply. Players may hold more than one non-FIFA nationality.

No.	Pos.	Nation	Player
7	DF	SRB	Dražen Okuka (from Kaposvár)
8	MF	KOR	Kim Ho-Young (from (Montenegro) Mornar)
10	MF	HUN	István Bognár (from Mezőkövesd)
11	FW	HUN	Tamás Takács (from Szigetszentmiklós)
21	MF	HUN	Gábor Bori (from Paks)
23	DF	HUN	Vilmos Szalai (from Mezőkövesd)
27	MF	NED	Julian Jenner (from Ferencváros)
29	DF	HUN	Milán Németh (from Pápa)
50	FW	CIV	Georges Griffiths (from (Austria) SV Ried)
89	GK	SRB	Nenad Rajić (from (Bosnia and Herzegovina) Leotar)
99	GK	HUN	Botond Antal (from Kaposvár)

Out: Note: Flags indicate national team as defined under FIFA eligibility rules; some limited exceptions apply. Players may hold more than one non-FIFA nationality.

No.	Pos.	Nation	Player
6	DF	HUN	Gergő Gohér (to Puskás)
10	MF	CMR	Mohamadolu Abdouraman (to Nyíregyháza)
11	MF	SRB	Zoran Kostić (to Nyíregyháza)
15	DF	HUN	András Vági (to Paks)
19	FW	HUN	Marcell Hornyák (to Rakamaz)
20	MF	HUN	Márk Nikházi (loan to Dunaújváros)
23	DF	HUN	Viktor Vadász (to Újpest)
55	GK	HUN	Vince Gelei (to Csákvár)
88	FW	ECU	Augusto Batioja (to (Serbia) Radnički Niš)
89	GK	SRB	Nenad Rajić
99	FW	HUN	Márkó Futács (loan return to (England) Leicester City)
—	GK	HUN	Péter Herceg (to Mezőkövesd)

=== Dunaújváros ===
In: Note: Flags indicate national team as defined under FIFA eligibility rules; some limited exceptions apply. Players may hold more than one non-FIFA nationality.

No.	Pos.	Nation	Player
3	FW	SRB	Milan Perić (loan from Videoton)
4	DF	CRO	Dino Gavrić (from (Cyprus) Paralimni)
8	MF	HUN	György Józsi (from Ferencváros)
13	FW	HUN	Péter Urbin (from Balmazújváros)
19	MF	ESP	Bruno Pascua (from (Spain) Gimnástica)
20	MF	HUN	Donát Zsótér (loan from Videoton)
23	MF	SVN	Timotej Dodlek (from (Slovenia) Maribor)
24	MF	MLT	Rowen Muscat (from (Malta) Birkirkara)
28	MF	HUN	Szilveszter Hangya (loan from MTK II)
29	MF	HUN	Márk Orosz (from Ferencváros)
30	MF	HUN	Márk Nikházi (loan from Diósgyőr)
32	DF	HUN	Adrián Szekeres (loan from Videoton)
33	GK	HUN	Gergely Nagy (from Győr)

Out: Note: Flags indicate national team as defined under FIFA eligibility rules; some limited exceptions apply. Players may hold more than one non-FIFA nationality.

No.	Pos.	Nation	Player
4	DF	SRB	Goran Beleuc
8	MF	GHA	Samuel Ato (to Nagykőrös)
12	MF	HUN	Máté Papp (loan return to Videoton II)
13	FW	HUN	Péter Urbin (to Szolnok)
13	MF	HUN	Ádám Galambos (loan to Szolnok)
14	MF	HUN	Gábor Kocsis (to Csákvár)
18	FW	HUN	Gábor Urbán (to (Austria) Hofstetten-Grünau)
19	DF	HUN	István Szauter
20	MF	SRB	David Perović (to Dorog)
22	GK	HUN	Balázs Bartus (to Dabas)

=== Ferencváros ===
In: Note: Flags indicate national team as defined under FIFA eligibility rules; some limited exceptions apply. Players may hold more than one non-FIFA nationality.

No.	Pos.	Nation	Player
7	MF	HUN	Bence Batik (loan return from MTK)
8	MF	CRO	Tomislav Havojić (from (Croatia) Istra)
11	FW	GER	Benjamin Lauth (from (Germany) 1860 München)
17	MF	CRO	Stjepan Kukuruzović (from (Switzerland) Zürich)
20	MF	HUN	Zoltán Gera (from (England) West Bromwich)
23	MF	HUN	Dániel Nagy (from (Germany) VfL Osnabrück)
24	FW	BEL	Roland Lamah (from (Spain) Osasuna)
27	DF	POL	Michał Nalepa (from (Poland) Wisla Krakow)
34	MF	HUN	Ádám Csilus (from Ferencváros U-19)
35	DF	HUN	Predrag Bošnjak (from Haladás)
39	MF	HUN	Márk Orosz (loan return from Pápa)
39	DF	CRO	Mateo Pavlović (loan from (Germany) Werder Bremen)
66	DF	AUT	Emir Dilaver (from Austria Wien)
85	GK	HUN	Pál Tarczy (from Soroksár)

Out: Note: Flags indicate national team as defined under FIFA eligibility rules; some limited exceptions apply. Players may hold more than one non-FIFA nationality.

No.	Pos.	Nation	Player
1	GK	HUN	Péter Kurucz (loan to Soroksár)
3	DF	NED	Mark Otten (retired)
4	DF	HUN	Sándor Hidvégi (loan to MTK)
7	MF	BIH	Aleksandar Jovanović (to Debrecen)
8	MF	HUN	György Józsi (to Dunaújváros)
10	MF	ROU	Andrei Ionescu
11	FW	NED	Arsenio Valpoort (to (Netherlands) Waalwijk)
14	FW	NED	Jack Tuyp (to (Netherlands) Helmond)
16	MF	HUN	Tamás Csilus (loan to Pápa)
17	FW	MLI	Ulysse Diallo (to (Portugal) Arouca)
21	DF	BIH	Muhamed Bešić (to (England) Everton)
27	MF	NED	Julian Jenner (to Diósgyőr)
37	MF	HUN	Péter Antal (loan to Soroksár)
39	DF	CRO	Mateo Pavlović (loan return to (Germany) Werder Bremen)
39	MF	HUN	Márk Orosz (to Dunaújváros)
41	GK	HUN	Roland Kunsági (loan to Mezőkövesd)
86	DF	HUN	Zsolt Laczkó (loan return to (Italy) Sampdoria)
99	MF	BRA	Leonardo (to (Germany) 1860 München)

=== Győr ===
In: Note: Flags indicate national team as defined under FIFA eligibility rules; some limited exceptions apply. Players may hold more than one non-FIFA nationality.

No.	Pos.	Nation	Player
1	GK	HUN	Krisztián Pogacsics (loan from (Romania) Bihor Oradea)
2	DF	HUN	Dániel Sváb (from (Germany) Energie Cottbus)
7	MF	HUN	András Stieber (from (England) Aston Villa U-21)
13	FW	GEO	Giorgi Kvilitaia (from (Georgia (country)) Dila Gori)
14	MF	HUN	Máté Kiss (loan return from Mezőkövesd)
19	FW	HUN	András Simon (loan return from Kecskemét)
20	FW	HUN	Tamás Priskin (from Austria Wien)
23	MF	HUN	József Windecker (loan return from Paks)
30	GK	SRB	Miloš Kocić (from (United States) Portland)

Out: Note: Flags indicate national team as defined under FIFA eligibility rules; some limited exceptions apply. Players may hold more than one non-FIFA nationality.

No.	Pos.	Nation	Player
1	GK	HUN	Krisztián Pogacsics (loan return to (Romania) Bihor Oradea)
4	DF	SRB	Lazar Stanišić
5	MF	CMR	Patrick Mevoungou
6	DF	SVK	Marián Had
7	FW	HUN	Balázs Farkas (to Győr II)
9	MF	SVN	Rok Kronaveter
13	MF	HUN	Zsolt Kalmár (to (Germany) RB Leipzig)
14	MF	HUN	Máté Kiss (loan to Gyirmót)
19	FW	HUN	András Simon (to Paks)
20	MF	ROU	Mihai Nicorec
27	GK	HUN	Gergely Nagy (to Dunaújváros)
28	DF	SRB	Vladimir Đorđević (to (Serbia) Radnički Niš)
30	FW	SLV	Rafael Burgos (loan return to (El Salvador) Alianza)

=== Kecskemét ===
In: Note: Flags indicate national team as defined under FIFA eligibility rules; some limited exceptions apply. Players may hold more than one non-FIFA nationality.

No.	Pos.	Nation	Player
1	GK	SVK	Tomáš Tujvel (loan from Videoton)
3	DF	SVK	Dominik Fótyik (from Mezőkövesd)
6	MF	HUN	Donát Szivacski (from Kecskemét U-19)
9	FW	HUN	Csanád Novák (from Győr II)
13	DF	HUN	Tamás Juhász (from Kecskemét U-19)
17	MF	HUN	Miklós Kitl (from Kecskemét U-19)
18	MF	HUN	Gábor Filyó (from Kecskemét U-19)
21	DF	HUN	Endre Botka (loan from Honvéd)
23	DF	HUN	Kristóf Polyák (from Honvéd U-19)
25	DF	CRO	Ivan Lovrić (from Honvéd)
29	MF	SRB	Stojan Pilipović (from (Serbia) OFK Beograd)
30	MF	TOG	Henri Eninful (from Újpest)
60	DF	HUN	András Komáromi (from Kecskemét U-19)
86	DF	HUN	Zsolt Laczkó (from Ferencváros)
88	MF	HUN	Viktor Tölgyesi (loan return from Békéscsaba)
91	FW	SEN	Bebeto (from (Switzerland) Lugano)
99	GK	HUN	Gergő Szabó (from Kecskemét U-19)

Out: Note: Flags indicate national team as defined under FIFA eligibility rules; some limited exceptions apply. Players may hold more than one non-FIFA nationality.

No.	Pos.	Nation	Player
1	GK	MNE	Vukašin Poleksić (loan return to Debrecen)
9	FW	HUN	András Simon (loan return to Győr)
11	MF	BRA	Eliomar (loan return to (Serbia) Partizan)
13	DF	HUN	Krisztián Póti (to Nyíregyháza)
20	FW	HUN	Márk Szécsi (loan return to Debrecen)
23	DF	HUN	Gyula Forró (to Újpest)
29	MF	HUN	Patrik Nagy (to (Germany) SV Seligenporten)
30	MF	TOG	Henri Eninful (loan return to Újpest)
40	MF	HUN	András Burics (loan return to Debrecen II)
60	MF	CIV	Brahima Touré (loan return to (Switzerland) Lugano)
77	FW	HUN	László Pekár (to Nyíregyháza)
88	MF	HUN	Viktor Tölgyesi (to Békéscsaba)
91	FW	SEN	Bebeto (loan return to (Switzerland) Lugano)

=== MTK ===
In: Note: Flags indicate national team as defined under FIFA eligibility rules; some limited exceptions apply. Players may hold more than one non-FIFA nationality.

No.	Pos.	Nation	Player
3	DF	HUN	Bence Deutsch (loan return from Szigetszentmiklós)
9	FW	ESP	Sergio Tamayo (from (Spain) Logroñés)
13	FW	HUN	Ádám Hrepka (from Haladás)
15	MF	SEN	Khaly Thiam (from Kaposvár)
20	FW	HUN	Balázs Batizi-Pócsi (loan return from Tatabánya)
22	MF	HUN	Benjámin Cseke (from Vasas)
25	DF	HUN	Sándor Hidvégi (loan from Ferencváros)
27	MF	HUN	Ramon Halmai (from Haladás II)
39	FW	HUN	Péter Horváth (loan return from Siófok)
—	FW	BRA	Bouard Ramos (loan return from Kisvárda)
—	MF	HUN	Ferenc Rácz (loan return from Pécs)

Out: Note: Flags indicate national team as defined under FIFA eligibility rules; some limited exceptions apply. Players may hold more than one non-FIFA nationality.

No.	Pos.	Nation	Player
14	DF	HUN	András Fejes (loan return to Videoton II)
20	FW	HUN	Balázs Batizi-Pócsi (loan to Balmazújváros)
20	DF	HUN	István Rodenbücher (loan to Vasas)
25	MF	ESP	Ayub (to (Spain) Real Valladolid B)
27	MF	HUN	Bence Batik (loan return to Ferencváros)
32	FW	HUN	Richárd Frank (to Pécs)
39	FW	HUN	Péter Horváth (loan to Sopron)
45	FW	HUN	Márton Eppel (loan return to Paks)
—	FW	BRA	Bouard Ramos (loan to Kisvárda)
—	MF	HUN	Ferenc Rácz (loan to Pécs)

=== Nyíregyháza ===
In: Note: Flags indicate national team as defined under FIFA eligibility rules; some limited exceptions apply. Players may hold more than one non-FIFA nationality.

No.	Pos.	Nation	Player
1	GK	HUN	Alex Hrabina (from Nyíregyháza U-19)
5	DF	HUN	Ferenc Fodor (from Pécs)
9	FW	HUN	Krisztián Koller (from Pécs)
10	MF	CMR	Mohamadolu Abdouraman (from Diósgyőr)
14	MF	SRB	Zoran Kostić (from Diósgyőr)
17	FW	HUN	Márk Szécsi (loan from Debrecen)
22	MF	HUN	Bence Lázár (loan from Újpest)
23	MF	HUN	István Spitzmüller (from Debrecen)
28	DF	HUN	Zoltán Nagy (loan from Debrecen)
31	DF	HUN	Krisztián Póti (from Kecskemét)
33	MF	HUN	Boris Živanović (from Honvéd)
77	FW	HUN	László Pekár (from Kecskemét)

Out: Note: Flags indicate national team as defined under FIFA eligibility rules; some limited exceptions apply. Players may hold more than one non-FIFA nationality.

No.	Pos.	Nation	Player
3	MF	HUN	Mihály Ulvicki (to Jászapáti)
5	MF	HUN	Róbert Kis (to Balmazújváros)
6	MF	HUN	Donát Reznek (loan to Balmazújváros)
10	FW	HUN	Péter Szilágyi (to Békéscsaba)
14	MF	HUN	Szabolcs Csordás (to Ajka)
17	MF	HUN	Dániel Kákonyi (to Gyirmót)
19	FW	HUN	János Máté (loan return to Szolnok)
22	DF	HUN	Gábor Polényi (to Vasas)
22	MF	HUN	Bence Lázár (loan return to Újpest)
24	MF	HUN	Roland Paku (loan return to Győr II)
31	DF	HUN	Krisztián Póti

=== Paks ===
In: Note: Flags indicate national team as defined under FIFA eligibility rules; some limited exceptions apply. Players may hold more than one non-FIFA nationality.

No.	Pos.	Nation	Player
—	MF	HUN	Lajos Bertus (from Puskás)
—	MF	HUN	János Hahn (from Puskás)
—	DF	HUN	Zsolt Gévay (from Mezőkövesd)
—	MF	HUN	Zsolt Tamási (from (Italy) Parma)
—	FW	HUN	Barnabás Vári (loan return from Szolnok)
—	MF	HUN	Roland Bohner (loan return from Szolnok)
—	FW	HUN	István Nagy (loan return from Szolnok)
—	DF	HUN	József Zsók (loan return from Baja)
—	FW	HUN	Márton Eppel (loan return from MTK Budapest)
—	MF	HUN	Norbert Heffler (loan return from Sopron)
—	FW	HUN	Dániel Tóth (loan return from Kozármisleny)

Out: Note: Flags indicate national team as defined under FIFA eligibility rules; some limited exceptions apply. Players may hold more than one non-FIFA nationality.

No.	Pos.	Nation	Player
9	FW	HUN	Attila Simon (to (Austria) Wolfsberger AC)
21	MF	HUN	Gábor Bori (to Diósgyőr)
22	MF	HUN	József Windecker (loan return to Győr)
23	MF	HUN	Olivér Nagy (to Haladás)
27	MF	HUN	Norbert Heffler (to Pécs)
63	DF	HUN	László Éger (retired)
—	FW	HUN	Dániel Tóth (loan to Szolnok)
—	MF	HUN	Roland Bohner (loan to Szolnok)
—	FW	HUN	István Nagy (loan to Szolnok)
—	FW	HUN	Barnabás Vári (loan to Szolnok)

=== Pápa ===
In: Note: Flags indicate national team as defined under FIFA eligibility rules; some limited exceptions apply. Players may hold more than one non-FIFA nationality.

No.	Pos.	Nation	Player
7	FW	HUN	Milán Faggyas (from Sopron)
9	FW	HUN	Róbert Waltner (from Siófok)
10	DF	BRA	Bernardo Frizoni (from Zalaegerszeg)
11	MF	LVA	Vadims Žuļevs (from (Latvia) Jelgava)
11	FW	HUN	Gergő Beliczky (loan return from Gyirmót)
13	MF	HUN	Tamás Csilus (loan from Ferencváros)
17	MF	HUN	Andrei Florean (from Kaposvár)
19	MF	SVK	Marián Sluka (from Zalaegerszeg)
24	MF	ROU	Andrei Coroian (from Kaposvár)
25	FW	HUN	Szabolcs Gál (from Ferencváros II)
28	MF	SWE	Kristian Benkő (from Rákospalota)
55	DF	SRB	Milan Bogunović (from Zalaegerszeg)
89	FW	SRB	Saša Popin (from (Romania) Săgeata Năvodari)
97	MF	HUN	Bálint Böröczky (from Pápa U-19)
—	FW	HUN	Dénes Olasz (loan from Mezőkövesd)

Out: Note: Flags indicate national team as defined under FIFA eligibility rules; some limited exceptions apply. Players may hold more than one non-FIFA nationality.

No.	Pos.	Nation	Player
2	DF	HUN	Sándor Nagy (to Gyirmót)
5	DF	HUN	András Dlusztus (to Szeged)
7	FW	HUN	István Eszlátyi (to Sopron)
9	MF	SRB	Lazar Arsić (to (Serbia) Radnički)
10	FW	SRB	Goran Marić (to Dunaújváros)
11	FW	HUN	Gergő Beliczky (to Gyirmót)
11	MF	HUN	Márk Orosz (loan return to Ferencváros)
13	DF	SVK	Peter Struhár (to (Slovakia) Dunajská Streda)
20	MF	HUN	Kornél Kulcsár (loan return to Haladás)
29	DF	HUN	Milán Németh (to Diósgyőr)
32	DF	HUN	Ádám Présinger (to Gyirmót)
50	FW	CIV	Georges Griffiths (to Diósgyőr)
77	FW	HUN	Richárd Horváth (loan to Salgótarján)
91	MF	HUN	Tamás Tajthy (to Mezőkövesd)
98	MF	MAR	Youssef Sekour (to (Morocco) Rabat)

=== Pécs ===
In: Note: Flags indicate national team as defined under FIFA eligibility rules; some limited exceptions apply. Players may hold more than one non-FIFA nationality.

No.	Pos.	Nation	Player
—	MF	HUN	Norbert Heffler (from Paks)
—	MF	NGA	Eke Uzoma (from (Germany) SV Sandhausen)
—	FW	HUN	Péter Pölöskei (from Debrecen)
—	DF	CRO	Andrej Čaušić (from (Slovakia) Dunajská Streda)
—	FW	HUN	Ferenc Rácz (loan from MTK)
—	GK	HUN	Donát Helesfay (loan from Kozármisleny)
—	GK	HUN	Péter Molnár (loan return from Kozármisleny)
—	GK	HUN	Ádám Holczer (loan return from Kozármisleny)

Out: Note: Flags indicate national team as defined under FIFA eligibility rules; some limited exceptions apply. Players may hold more than one non-FIFA nationality.

No.	Pos.	Nation	Player
5	DF	HUN	Ferenc Fodor (to Nyíregyháza)
9	FW	HUN	Krisztián Koller (to Nyíregyháza)
11	MF	HUN	Miroszláv Zsdrál (to Kaposvár)
13	FW	SRB	Milan Perić (loan return to Videoton)
15	GK	HUN	Donát Helesfay (loan return to Kozármisleny)
20	MF	HUN	Viktor Városi (to Haladás)
25	FW	HUN	Ferenc Rácz (loan return to MTK Budapest)
31	GK	HUN	Bence Steer (to (Norway) Nardo)
31	GK	HUN	Ádám Holczer (to Soroksár)
37	MF	HUN	Dávid Bailo (to Zalaegerszeg)
60	FW	HUN	Péter Pölöskei (loan return to Debrecen)

=== Puskás ===
In: Note: Flags indicate national team as defined under FIFA eligibility rules; some limited exceptions apply. Players may hold more than one non-FIFA nationality.

No.	Pos.	Nation	Player
—	FW	HUN	László Lencse (from Videoton)
—	MF	HUN	Balázs Tóth (loan from Videoton)
—	DF	HUN	Zsolt Tar (loan from Videoton II)
—	FW	SVK	Zoltán Harsányi (loan from Mezőkövesd)
—	MF	HUN	Máté Papp (loan from Videoton)
—	MF	HUN	Martin Hudák (loan from Videoton II)
—	MF	HUN	Dénes Szakály (from Videoton)
—	DF	HUN	Gergő Gohér (from Diósgyőr)
—	GK	SRB	Branislav Danilović (from (Serbia) Rad)
—	DF	CRO	Renato Kelić (from (Italy) Padova)
—	DF	HUN	Csaba Vachtler (loan return from Balmazújváros)
—	FW	HUN	Roland Baracskai (loan return from Videoton II)
—	MF	HUN	Zsolt Gajdos (loan return from Békéscsaba)
—	MF	HUN	Bálint Károly (loan return from Békéscsaba)
—	MF	HUN	Márk Barcsay (loan return from Videoton II)
—	FW	HUN	Tibor Molnár (loan return from Videoton II)

Out: Note: Flags indicate national team as defined under FIFA eligibility rules; some limited exceptions apply. Players may hold more than one non-FIFA nationality.

No.	Pos.	Nation	Player
6	MF	HUN	Gáspár Orbán (retired)
7	DF	GRE	Vassilios Apostolopoulos (loan return to Videoton)
11	MF	HUN	Márk Barcsay (loan to Csákvár)
11	MF	HUN	István Berki (to Siófok)
13	GK	HUN	Bence Somodi (to Kaposvár)
19	MF	HUN	Zsolt Gajdos (loan to Csákvár)
20	MF	HUN	Balázs Tóth (loan return to Videoton)
22	DF	HUN	Tamás Vaskó
25	DF	HUN	Zsolt Nagy (loan to Videoton)
26	MF	HUN	Lajos Bertus (to Paks)
29	FW	HUN	László Lencse (loan return to Videoton)
30	MF	HUN	Norbert Farkas (to Zalaegerszeg)
33	DF	HUN	Balázs Tóth
35	FW	HUN	Tibor Molnár (loan to Csákvár)
42	DF	HUN	Márton Lorentz (loan return to Videoton II)
47	FW	HUN	János Hahn (to Paks)
71	MF	ESP	Francisco Gallardo (retired)
88	MF	HUN	Dénes Szakály (loan return to Videoton)
89	DF	HUN	Adrián Szekeres (loan return to Videoton)

=== Szombathely ===
In: Note: Flags indicate national team as defined under FIFA eligibility rules; some limited exceptions apply. Players may hold more than one non-FIFA nationality.

No.	Pos.	Nation	Player
—	MF	HUN	Viktor Városi (from Pécs)
—	FW	HUN	Balázs Zamostny (loan from Újpest)
—	MF	HUN	Olivér Nagy (from Paks)
—	MF	HUN	Gábor Varga (from Sopron)
—	DF	HUN	Máté Katona (from Sopron)
—	DF	HUN	Máté Hanzl (loan return from Ajka)
—	MF	HUN	Máté Skriba (loan return from Ajka)
—	DF	HUN	Márk Farkas (loan return from Gyirmót)
—	MF	HUN	Kornél Kulcsár (loan return from Pápa)
—	DF	HUN	Márk Jagodics (loan return from Ajka)
—	FW	HUN	Richárd Czafit (loan return from Balatonfüred)

Out: Note: Flags indicate national team as defined under FIFA eligibility rules; some limited exceptions apply. Players may hold more than one non-FIFA nationality.

No.	Pos.	Nation	Player
1	GK	HUN	Dávid Dombó (to (Austria) Lafnitz)
8	MF	HUN	Gábor Nagy (to Újpest)
9	FW	HUN	Ádám Hrepka (to MTK Budapest)
10	MF	HUN	Kornél Kulcsár (to Pápa)
15	DF	HUN	Péter Tóth (to (Austria) Pinkafeld)
16	MF	HUN	Máté Skriba
19	MF	HUN	Máté Hanzl (to Mezőkövesd)
35	DF	HUN	Predrag Bošnjak (to Ferencváros)
46	MF	HUN	Ádám Simon (loan return to (Italy) Palermo)

=== Újpest ===
In: Note: Flags indicate national team as defined under FIFA eligibility rules; some limited exceptions apply. Players may hold more than one non-FIFA nationality.

No.	Pos.	Nation	Player
—	MF	BEL	Jérémy Serwy (from (Germany) Borussia Dortmund II)
—	MF	HUN	Gergő Holdampf (from Zalaegerszeg)
—	FW	ALB	Berat Ahmeti (from (Kosovo) Prishtina)
—	DF	COL	Darwin Andrade (from (Belgium) St. Truiden)
—	MF	MNE	Nebojša Kosović (loan from (Belgium) Standard Liège)
—	MF	HUN	Gábor Nagy (from Haladás)
—	DF	HUN	Gyula Forró (from Kecskemét)
—	DF	HUN	Viktor Vadász (from Diósgyőr)
—	FW	FIN	Aristote Mboma (from (Finland) Honka)
—	DF	URU	Rodrigo Rojo (from (Uruguay) Fénix)
—	DF	HUN	Marcell Fodor (loan return from Ajka)
—	DF	BEL	Naïm Aarab (loan return from (Belgium) St. Truiden)
—	MF	TOG	Henri Eninful (loan return from Kecskemét)

Out: Note: Flags indicate national team as defined under FIFA eligibility rules; some limited exceptions apply. Players may hold more than one non-FIFA nationality.

No.	Pos.	Nation	Player
2	DF	COL	Darwin Andrade (loan to (Belgium) Standard Liège)
2	DF	HUN	Marcell Fodor (to Zalaegerszeg)
5	DF	ESP	Juanan (to (Spain) Recreativo de Huelva)
9	FW	COD	Jean-Marc Makasu (loan return to (Belgium) Standard Liège)
10	MF	MNE	Nebojša Kosović (loan return to (Belgium) Standard Liège)
11	FW	EST	Jarmo Ahjupera (to (Estonia) Nõmme Kalju)
13	MF	KEN	Hisham Said
15	MF	BEL	Nikolas Proesmans
16	FW	HUN	Bence Lázár (loan to Nyíregyháza)
17	DF	ESP	Chema Antón
20	MF	TOG	Henri Eninful (to Kecskemét)
24	DF	BEL	Simon Ligot (loan return to (Belgium) Standard Liège)
26	FW	HUN	Balázs Zamostny (loan to Haladás)
34	DF	BEL	Naïm Aarab
35	DF	BIH	Bojan Mihajlović
55	DF	BEL	Pierre-Yves Ngawa (loan return to (Belgium) Standard Liège)

=== Videoton ===
In: Note: Flags indicate national team as defined under FIFA eligibility rules; some limited exceptions apply. Players may hold more than one non-FIFA nationality.

No.	Pos.	Nation	Player
—	DF	HUN	Zsolt Nagy (loan from Puskás)
—	FW	HUN	Róbert Feczesin (from (Italy) Padova)
—	GK	HUN	Tamás Horváth (from Mezőkövesd)
—	MF	CRO	Dinko Trebotić (from (Croatia) Lokomotiva)
—	MF	HUN	Ádám Simon (from (Italy) Palermo)
—	DF	HUN	András Fejes (from Videoton II)
—	MF	HUN	Dénes Szakály (loan return from Puskás)
—	DF	GRE	Vassilios Apostolopoulos (loan return from Puskás)
—	DF	HUN	Adrián Szekeres (loan return from Puskás)
—	FW	HUN	László Lencse (loan return from Puskás)
—	MF	HUN	Balázs Tóth (loan return from Puskás)
—	MF	HUN	Donát Zsótér (loan return from Szolnok)
—	FW	SRB	Milan Perić (loan return from Pécs)
14	DF	MAR	Sofian Chakla (from (Spain) Real Betis B)

Out: Note: Flags indicate national team as defined under FIFA eligibility rules; some limited exceptions apply. Players may hold more than one non-FIFA nationality.

No.	Pos.	Nation	Player
3	FW	SRB	Milan Perić (loan to Dunaújváros)
5	DF	GRE	Vassilios Apostolopoulos
5	MF	POR	Vítor Gomes
6	MF	BRA	Nildo Petrolina
7	MF	HUN	Dénes Szakály (to Puskás)
7	FW	BRA	Paraíba
9	FW	POR	Jucie Lupeta (to (Portugal) Setúbal)
12	GK	SVK	Tomáš Tujvel (loan to Kecskemét)
18	MF	HUN	Máté Papp (loan to Puskás)
19	FW	HUN	László Lencse (to Puskás)
20	MF	HUN	Donát Zsótér (loan to Dunaújváros)
21	DF	HUN	Adrián Szekeres (loan to Dunaújváros)
24	DF	GNB	Mamadu Candé
26	MF	HUN	Balázs Tóth (loan to Puskás)
29	FW	CPV	Zé Luís (loan return to (Portugal) Braga)
99	MF	SRB	Uroš Nikolić (to Videoton II)
