= 2014–15 Kecskeméti TE season =

Kecskeméti TE
2014–15 season
- Chairman: (Hungary) Pál Rózsa (Hungary) János Versegi
- Manager: (Hungary) Balázs Bekő
Home colours	Away colours

The 2014–15 season will be Kecskeméti TE's 7th competitive season, 7th consecutive season in the OTP Bank Liga and 103rd year in existence as a football club.

== First team squad ==
Note: Flags indicate national team as defined under FIFA eligibility rules; some limited exceptions apply. Players may hold more than one non-FIFA nationality.

No.	Pos.	Nation	Player
1	GK	SVK	Tomáš Tujvel (loan from Videoton)
3	DF	SVK	Dominik Fótyik
4	DF	HUN	Róbert Varga
5	FW	MNE	Darko Pavićević
6	MF	HUN	Donát Szivacski
7	FW	HUN	Zsolt Balázs
8	MF	HUN	Zsolt Patvaros
9	FW	HUN	Csanád Novák
10	MF	MNE	Vladan Savić
14	MF	MNE	Marko Vukasović
15	DF	HUN	Attila Gyagya
17	MF	HUN	Miklós Kitl

No.	Pos.	Nation	Player
19	FW	HUN	Gábor Gréczi
21	DF	HUN	Endre Botka (loan from Honvéd)
23	DF	HUN	Kristóf Polyák
25	DF	CRO	Ivan Lovrić
26	FW	HUN	Dárius Csillag
29	MF	SRB	Stojan Pilipović
30	MF	TOG	Henri Eninful
31	DF	SRB	Dejan Karan
86	DF	HUN	Zsolt Laczkó
91	FW	SEN	Bebeto
92	DF	HUN	András Farkas

== Transfers ==
=== Summer ===
In: Note: Flags indicate national team as defined under FIFA eligibility rules; some limited exceptions apply. Players may hold more than one non-FIFA nationality.

No.	Pos.	Nation	Player
1	GK	SVK	Tomáš Tujvel (loan from Videoton)
3	DF	SVK	Dominik Fótyik (from Mezőkövesd)
6	MF	HUN	Donát Szivacski (from Kecskemét U-19)
9	FW	HUN	Csanád Novák (from Győr II)
13	DF	HUN	Tamás Juhász (from Kecskemét U-19)
17	MF	HUN	Miklós Kitl (from Kecskemét U-19)
18	MF	HUN	Gábor Filyó (from Kecskemét U-19)
21	DF	HUN	Endre Botka (loan from Honvéd)
23	DF	HUN	Kristóf Polyák (from Honvéd U-19)
25	DF	CRO	Ivan Lovrić (from Honvéd)
29	MF	SRB	Stojan Pilipović (from (Serbia) OFK Beograd)
30	MF	TOG	Henri Eninful (from Újpest)
60	DF	HUN	András Komáromi (from Kecskemét U-19)
86	DF	HUN	Zsolt Laczkó (from Ferencváros)
88	MF	HUN	Viktor Tölgyesi (loan return from Békéscsaba)
91	FW	SEN	Bebeto (from (Switzerland) Lugano)
99	GK	HUN	Gergő Szabó (from Kecskemét U-19)

Out: Note: Flags indicate national team as defined under FIFA eligibility rules; some limited exceptions apply. Players may hold more than one non-FIFA nationality.

No.	Pos.	Nation	Player
1	GK	MNE	Vukašin Poleksić (loan return to Debrecen)
9	FW	HUN	András Simon (loan return to Győr)
11	MF	BRA	Eliomar (loan return to (Serbia) Partizan)
13	DF	HUN	Krisztián Póti (to Nyíregyháza)
20	FW	HUN	Márk Szécsi (loan return to Debrecen)
23	DF	HUN	Gyula Forró (to Újpest)
29	MF	HUN	Patrik Nagy (to (Germany) Seligenporten)
30	MF	TOG	Henri Eninful (loan return to Újpest)
40	MF	HUN	András Burics (loan return to Debrecen II)
60	MF	CIV	Brahima Touré (loan return to (Switzerland) Lugano)
77	FW	HUN	László Pekár (to Nyíregyháza)
88	MF	HUN	Viktor Tölgyesi (to Békéscsaba)
91	FW	SEN	Bebeto (loan return to (Switzerland) Lugano)

- List of Hungarian football transfers summer 2014

== Statistics ==
=== Appearances and goals ===
Last updated on 6 December 2014.

No.	Pos	Nat	Player	Total		OTP Bank Liga		Hungarian Cup		League Cup	
No.	Pos	Nat	Player	Apps	Goals	Apps	Goals	Apps	Goals	Apps	Goals
1	GK	(Slovakia) SVK	Tomáš Tujvel	17	-21	17	-21	0	0	0	0
3	DF	(Slovakia) SVK	Dominik Fótyik	15	0	10	0	1	0	4	0
4	DF	(Hungary) HUN	Róbert Varga	19	1	15	1	3	0	1	0
5	FW	(Montenegro) MNE	Darko Pavićević	3	1	3	1	0	0	0	0
6	MF	(Hungary) HUN	Donát Szivacski	6	0	1	0	0	0	5	0
7	FW	(Hungary) HUN	Zsolt Balázs	22	6	16	3	3	3	3	0
8	MF	(Hungary) HUN	Zsolt Patvaros	15	0	8	0	2	0	5	0
9	FW	(Hungary) HUN	Csanád Novák	21	6	13	2	3	3	5	1
10	MF	(Montenegro) MNE	Vladan Savić	16	0	14	0	1	0	1	0
14	MF	(Montenegro) MNE	Marko Vukasović	18	4	13	2	3	1	2	1
15	DF	(Hungary) HUN	Attila Gyagya	14	0	8	0	1	0	5	0
17	MF	(Hungary) HUN	Miklós Kitl	18	2	14	1	2	0	2	1
19	FW	(Hungary) HUN	Gábor Gréczi	18	1	10	0	2	0	6	1
21	DF	(Hungary) HUN	Endre Botka	21	2	15	1	3	1	3	0
23	DF	(Hungary) HUN	Kristóf Polyák	6	0	3	0	0	0	3	0
25	DF	(Croatia) CRO	Ivan Lovrić	19	0	16	0	1	0	2	0
26	FW	(Hungary) HUN	Dárius Csillag	4	0	1	0	0	0	3	0
29	MF	(Serbia) SRB	Stojan Pilipović	12	1	5	0	3	1	4	0
30	MF	(Togo) TOG	Henri Eninful	19	1	13	0	2	1	4	0
31	DF	(Serbia) SRB	Dejan Karan	19	0	16	0	3	0	0	0
86	DF	(Hungary) HUN	Zsolt Laczkó	7	0	5	0	0	0	2	0
91	FW	(Senegal) SEN	Bebeto	21	7	17	5	2	1	2	1
92	DF	(Hungary) HUN	András Farkas	11	0	2	0	3	0	6	0
Youth players:
12	GK	(Hungary) HUN	Viktor Németh	5	-9	0	0	3	-7	2	-2
13	DF	(Hungary) HUN	Tamás Sutus-Juhász	3	0	0	0	0	0	3	0
16	MF	(Hungary) HUN	Dániel Szalai	5	0	0	0	0	0	5	0
18	MF	(Hungary) HUN	Gábor Filyó	3	0	0	0	0	0	3	0
40	DF	(Hungary) HUN	Tamás Szabó	1	1	0	0	0	0	1	1
55	MF	(Hungary) HUN	Dániel Dudás	3	0	0	0	0	0	3	0
60	DF	(Hungary) HUN	András Komáromi	2	0	0	0	0	0	2	0
70	FW	(Hungary) HUN	Péter Csima	2	0	0	0	0	0	2	0
95	GK	(Hungary) HUN	Konrád Verebélyi	4	-7	0	0	0	0	4	-7
99	GK	(Hungary) HUN	Gergő Szabó	1	0	0	0	0	0	1	0
Players no longer at the club:
88	MF	(Hungary) HUN	Viktor Tölgyesi	4	0	3	0	1	0	0	0

=== Top scorers ===
Includes all competitive matches. The list is sorted by shirt number when total goals are equal.

Last updated on 6 December 2014

Position	Nation	Number	Name	OTP Bank Liga	Hungarian Cup	League Cup	Total
1	(Senegal)	91	Bebeto	5	1	1	7
2	(Hungary)	7	Zsolt Balázs	3	3	0	6
3	(Hungary)	9	Csanád Novák	2	3	1	6
4	(Montenegro)	15	Marko Vukasović	2	1	1	4
5	(Hungary)	21	Endre Botka	1	1	0	2
6	(Hungary)	17	Miklós Kitl	1	0	1	2
7	(Montenegro)	5	Darko Pavićević	1	0	0	1
8	(Hungary)	4	Róbert Varga	1	0	0	1
9	(Togo)	30	Henri Eninful	0	1	0	1
10	(Serbia)	29	Stojan Pilipović	0	1	0	1
11	(Hungary)	19	Gábor Gréczi	0	0	1	1
12	(Hungary)	40	Tamás Szabó	0	0	1	1
/	/	/	Own Goals	2	2	0	4
			TOTALS	18	13	6	37

=== Disciplinary record ===
Includes all competitive matches. Players with 1 card or more included only.

Last updated on 6 December 2014

Position	Nation	Number	Name	OTP Bank Liga		Hungarian Cup		League Cup		Total (Hu Total)	
Position	Nation	Number	Name	Booked	Sent off (straight red)	Booked	Sent off (straight red)	Booked	Sent off (straight red)	Booked	Sent off (straight red)
GK	(Slovakia)	1	Tomáš Tujvel	1	0	0	0	0	0	1 (1)	0 (0)
DF	(Slovakia)	3	Dominik Fótyik	3	0	0	0	0	0	3 (3)	0 (0)
DF	(Hungary)	4	Róbert Varga	1	0	1	0	0	0	2 (1)	0 (0)
FW	(Montenegro)	5	Darko Pavićević	1	0	0	0	0	0	1 (1)	0 (0)
FW	(Hungary)	7	Zsolt Balázs	2	0	1	0	0	0	3 (2)	0 (0)
MF	(Hungary)	8	Zsolt Patvaros	2	1	1	0	0	0	3 (2)	1 (1)
FW	(Hungary)	9	Csanád Novák	2	0	1	0	1	0	4 (2)	0 (0)
MF	(Montenegro)	10	Vladan Savić	2	0	0	0	0	0	2 (2)	0 (0)
MF	(Montenegro)	14	Marko Vukasović	2	0	0	0	0	0	2 (2)	0 (0)
DF	(Hungary)	15	Attila Gyagya	1	0	0	0	0	0	1 (1)	0 (0)
MF	(Hungary)	17	Miklós Kitl	3	0	1	0	0	0	4 (3)	0 (0)
FW	(Hungary)	19	Gábor Gréczi	3	0	0	0	0	0	3 (3)	0 (0)
DF	(Hungary)	21	Endre Botka	4	0	1	1	0	0	5 (4)	1 (0)
DF	(Hungary)	23	Kristóf Polyák	2	0	0	0	0	0	2 (2)	0 (0)
DF	(Croatia)	25	Ivan Lovrić	4	0	0	0	0	0	4 (4)	0 (0)
FW	(Hungary)	26	Dárius Csillag	0	0	0	0	1	0	1 (0)	0 (0)
MF	(Serbia)	29	Stojan Pilipović	2	0	1	0	0	0	3 (2)	0 (0)
MF	(Togo)	30	Henri Eninful	2	0	0	0	0	0	2 (2)	0 (0)
DF	(Serbia)	31	Dejan Karan	4	0	0	0	0	0	4 (4)	0 (0)
DF	(Hungary)	86	Zsolt Laczkó	3	0	0	0	0	0	3 (3)	0 (0)
FW	(Senegal)	91	Bebeto	5	0	0	0	0	0	5 (5)	0 (0)
DF	(Hungary)	92	András Farkas	0	0	0	0	1	0	1 (0)	0 (0)
			TOTALS	48	1	8	1	3	0	59 (48)	2 (1)

=== Overall ===
Games played	26 (18 OTP Bank Liga, 3 Hungarian Cup and 5 Hungarian League Cup)
Games won	10 (7 OTP Bank Liga, 2 Hungarian Cup and 1 Hungarian League Cup)
Games drawn	5 (4 OTP Bank Liga, 0 Hungarian Cup and 1 Hungarian League Cup)
Games lost	11 (7 OTP Bank Liga, 1 Hungarian Cup and 3 Hungarian League Cup)
Goals scored	37
Goals conceded	37
Goal difference	0
Yellow cards	59
Red cards	2
Worst discipline	(Hungary) Endre Botka (5 (yellow card) , 1 (red card) )
Best result	8–0 (A) v Nyíradony - Magyar Kupa - 13-08-2014
Worst result	2–5 (A) v Vác - Magyar Kupa - 24-09-2014
Most appearances	(Hungary) Zsolt Balázs (22 appearances)
Top scorer	(Senegal) Bebeto (7 goals)
Points	35/78 (44.3%)

Last updated: 6 December 2014

== Nemzeti Bajnokság I ==
=== Matches ===
27 July 2014 1	Kecskemét	1 – 3	Ferencváros	Kecskemét, Bács-Kiskun County
16:30 CEST	Kitl 62'	Report	Böde 25', 76', 85'	Stadium: Széktói Stadion; Attendance: 2,432; Referee: (Hungary) Zoltán Iványi

2 August 2014 2	Kecskemét	0 – 1	Haladás	Kecskemét, Bács-Kiskun County
20:30 CEST		Report	Nagy 2'	Stadium: Széktói Stadion; Attendance: 1,411; Referee: (Hungary) Ádám Farkas

9 August 2014 3	Pápa	3 – 2	Kecskemét	Pápa, Veszprém County
18:30 CEST	Sluka 20'; Csizmadia 41'; Popin 43'	Report	Novák 7'; Pavićević 30'	Stadium: Stadion Várkerti; Attendance: 850; Referee: (Hungary) Zsolt Szabó

17 August 2014 4	Diósgyőr	2 – 1	Kecskemét	Miskolc, Borsod-Abaúj-Zemplén County
20:30 CEST	Grumić 16'; Takács 90+3'	Report	Vukasović 57'	Stadium: DVTK Stadion; Attendance: 5,042; Referee: (Hungary) Tamás Bognár

23 August 2014 5	Kecskemét	0 – 0	Dunaújváros	Kecskemét, Bács-Kiskun County
18:30 CEST		Report		Stadium: Széktói Stadion; Attendance: 1,411; Referee: (Hungary) Csaba Pintér

30 August 2014 6	Pécs	1 – 2	Kecskemét	Pécs, Baranya County
18:30 CEST	Pölöskei 86'	Report	Bebeto 14'; Balázs 48'	Stadium: Stadion PMFC; Attendance: 1,050; Referee: (Hungary) Mihály Fábián

22 October 2014 7	Kecskemét	1 – 1	Győr	Kecskemét, Bács-Kiskun County
18:00 CEST	Bebeto 60'	Report	Lipták 35'	Stadium: Széktói Stadion; Attendance: 922; Referee: (Hungary) Péter Solymosi

21 September 2014 8	Debrecen	0 – 0	Kecskemét	Debrecen, Hajdú-Bihar County
18:30 CEST		Report		Stadium: Nagyerdei Stadion; Attendance: 2,283; Referee: (Hungary) Tamás Bognár

27 September 2014 9	Kecskemét	1 – 0	Nyíregyháza	Kecskemét, Bács-Kiskun County
14:30 CEST	Bebeto 35'	Report		Stadium: Széktói Stadion; Attendance: 1,103; Referee: (Hungary) Viktor Kassai

4 October 2014 10	Paks	2 – 3	Kecskemét	Paks, Tolna County
18:00 CEST	Kovács 7'; Haraszti 90+3'	Report	Bebeto 5'; Botka 61'; Balázs 71'	Stadium: Stadion PSE; Attendance: 1,483; Referee: (Hungary) Zsolt Szabó

18 October 2014 11	Kecskemét	0 – 1	MTK	Kecskemét, Bács-Kiskun County
18:00 CEST		Report	Kanta 47' (pen.)	Stadium: Széktói Stadion; Attendance: 1,472; Referee: (Hungary) Tamás Bognár

25 October 2014 12	Kecskemét	1 – 0	Honvéd	Kecskemét, Bács-Kiskun County
16:00 CEST	Balázs 9'	Report		Stadium: Széktói Stadion; Attendance: 983; Referee: (Hungary) Ádám Farkas

31 October 2014 13	Kecskemét	2 – 1	Puskás	Kecskemét, Bács-Kiskun County
19:00 CET	Varga 37'; Bebeto 45'	Report	Tischler 9'	Stadium: Széktói Stadion; Attendance: 1,012; Referee: (Hungary) Viktor Kassai

8 November 2014 14	Kecskemét	0 – 0	Videoton	Kecskemét, Bács-Kiskun County
14:00 CET		Report		Stadium: Széktói Stadion; Attendance: 1,882; Referee: (Hungary) Zoltán Iványi

21 November 2014 15	Kecskemét	2 – 0	Újpest	Kecskemét, Bács-Kiskun County
19:00 CET	Ojo 5' (o.g.); Balogh 30' (o.g.)	Report		Stadium: Széktói Stadion; Attendance: 1,525; Referee: (Hungary) Viktor Kassai

29 November 2014 16	Ferencváros	3 – 1	Kecskemét	Budapest, Pest County
20:00 CET	Lauth 52', 68'; Lamah 62'	Report	Vukasović 42' (pen.)	Stadium: Groupama Arena; Attendance: 3,627; Referee: (Hungary) József Erdős

6 December 2014 17	Haladás	3 – 1	Kecskemét	Szombathely, Vas County
18:00 CET	Iszlai 8' (pen.); Varga 15' (o.g.); Devecseri 60'	Report	Novák 90+1'	Stadium: Rohonci Street Stadium; Attendance: 1,000; Referee: (Hungary) Péter Solymosi

=== Classification ===
Pos	Team	Pld	W	D	L	GF	GA	GD	Pts	Qualification or relegation
7	Diósgyőr	30	13	9	8	43	36	+7	48	
8	Győr (R)	30	10	8	12	41	44	−3	38	Relegation to Nemzeti Bajnokság III (Note: Győr won't be a member of 2015–16 Nemzeti Bajnokság I due to financial and licence problems)
9	Kecskemét (R)	30	10	8	12	30	39	−9	38	Dissolved - Kecskeméti LC KTE SI in the Bács-Kiskun County Football League One as successor (Note: Kecskemét, Nyíregyháza and Pécs won't be members of 2015–16 Nemzeti Bajnokság I due to licence problems)
10	Puskás Akadémia	30	10	5	15	35	40	−5	35	
11	Pécs (R)	30	8	7	15	32	51	−19	31	Relegation to Baranya County Football League One

Source: mlsz.hu (in Hungarian)
Rules for classification: 1st points; 2nd overall wins; 3rd goal difference; 4th head-to-head points; 5th head-to-head goal difference; 6th head-to-head away goals scored; 7th fair-play points; 8th drawing of lots
(R) Relegated

=== Results summary ===
Overall								Home						Away					
Pld	W	D	L	GF	GA	GD	Pts	W	D	L	GF	GA	GD	W	D	L	GF	GA	GD
17	6	4	7	18	21	−3	22	4	3	3	8	7	+1	2	1	4	10	14	−4

Last updated: 6 December 2014.
Source: NB1

=== Results by round ===
Round	1	2	3	4	5	6	7	8	9	10	11	12	13	14	15	16	17	18	19	20	21	22	23	24	25	26	27	28	29	30
Ground	H	H	A	A	H	A	H	A	H	A	H	H	H	H	H	A	A													
Result	L	L	L	L	D	W	D	D	W	W	L	W	W	D	W	L	L													
Position	12	15	15	16	16	12	13	13	12	8	10	9	8	9	8	8	10													

Updated to match(es) played on 6 December 2014. Source: Matches
A = Away; H = Home; W = Win; D = Draw; L = Loss

== Hungarian Cup ==
13 August 2014 Round 1	Nyíradony	0 – 8	Kecskemét	Nyíradony, Hajdú-Bihar County
17:00 CEST		Report	Tóth 40' (o.g.); Novák 51', 62', 65'; Botka 77'; Eninful 86'; Pilipović 87'; Balázs 90'	Stadium: Városi Sporttelep; Referee: (Hungary) Ferenc Karakó

10 September 2014 Round 2	Zalaegerszeg	2 – 3	Kecskemét	Zalaegerszeg, Zala County
17:00 CEST	Délczeg 45'; Wittman 89'	Report	Délczeg 47' (o.g.); Bebeto 58'; Balázs 84'	Stadium: ZTE Arena; Attendance: 800; Referee: (Hungary) Zoltán J. Kovács

24 September 2014 Round 3	Vác	5 – 2 (a.e.t.)	Kecskemét	Vác, Pest County
15:00 CEST	Zsolnai 70'; Gulyás 90+2' (pen.), 114' (pen.); Pallagi 95'; Nagy 101'	Report	Balázs 83'; Vukasović 90'	Stadium: Stadion Városi Vác; Attendance: 400; Referee: (Hungary) János Takács

== League Cup ==
=== Group stage ===
2 September 2014 1	Békéscsaba	2 – 3	Kecskemét	Békéscsaba, Békés County
16:30 CEST	Vólent 19'; Birtalan 53'	Report	Gréczi 9'; Novák 22'; Szabó 33'	Stadium: Stadion Kórház utcai Attendance: 150; Referee: (Hungary) Tamás Nazsa

16 September 2014 2	Kecskemét	0 – 0	Szeged	Kecskemét, Bács-Kiskun County
15:00 CEST		Report		Stadium: Széktói Stadion; Attendance: 200; Referee: (Hungary) Ádám Radványi

7 October 2014 3	Kecskemét	0 – 2	Debrecen	Kecskemét, Bács-Kiskun County
17:00 CEST		Report	Kulcsár 3', 86'	Stadium: Széktói Stadion; Attendance: 200; Referee: (Hungary) László Lovas

15 October 2014 4	Debrecen	2 – 0	Kecskemét	Debrecen, Hajdú-Bihar County
15:00 CEST	Berdó 33'; Jovanović 37'	Report		Stadium: Stadion Oláh Gábor Út; Attendance: 800; Referee: (Hungary) Gergely Szőts

12 November 2014 5	Szeged	3 – 1	Kecskemét	Gyula, Békés County
13:30 CET	Hegedűs 14'; Oláh 22'; Fitos 63'	Report	Vukasović 33'	Stadium: Grosics Akadémia Sporttelep; Attendance: 100; Referee: (Hungary) Tamás Nazsa

18 November 2014 6	Kecskemét	2 – 0	Békéscsaba	Kecskemét, Bács-Kiskun County
15:00 CET	Kitl 27'; Bebeto 76'	Report		Stadium: Széktói Stadion; Attendance: 200; Referee: (Hungary) Róbert Nagy

Pos	Team	Pld	W	D	L	GF	GA	GD	Pts	Qualification	DEB	BÉK	KEC	SZE
1	Debrecen	6	4	1	1	17	4	+13	13	Advance to knockout phase	—	2–3	2–0	1–1
2	Békéscsaba	6	3	0	3	10	14	−4	9	Advance to knockout phase	0–6	—	2–3	2–0
3	Kecskemét	6	2	1	3	6	9	−3	7		0–2	2–0	—	0–0
4	Szeged	6	1	2	3	5	11	−6	5		0–4	1–3	3–1	—

Source: Soccerway
