= 2016–17 Gyirmót FC Győr season =

Gyirmót
2016–17 season
- Chief executives: Ernő Horváth
- Manager: István Urbányi
- Stadium: Ménfői úti Stadion
- Nemzeti Bajnokság I: 12th (relegated)
- Magyar Kupa: Round of 16
- Top goalscorer: League: Mijuško Bojović; Csanád Novák (3 each); All: Vince Szegi (4)
- Highest home attendance: 4,200 v Ferencváros (17 August 2016, Nemzeti Bajnokság I)
- Lowest home attendance: 300 v Mezőkövesd (1 March 2017, Magyar Kupa)
- Average home league attendance: 1,463
- Biggest win: 7–0 v Zalakomár (Away, 14 September 2016, Magyar Kupa)
- Biggest defeat: 0–4 v Debrecen (Away, 31 July 2016, Nemzeti Bajnokság I); 0–4 v Videoton (Home, 7 August 2016, Nemzeti Bajnokság I); 0–4 v Videoton (Away, 5 November 2016, Nemzeti Bajnokság I); 0–4 v Honvéd (Home, 3 December 2016, Nemzeti Bajnokság I)

The 2016–17 season was Gyirmót Football Club Győr's 24th season in existence as a football club and first ever season in the Hungarian top flight after winning the second division in the previous season. In addition to the domestic league, Gyirmót participated in that season's editions of the Magyar Kupa.

== Squad ==
Squad at end of season

Note: Flags indicate national team as defined under FIFA eligibility rules; some limited exceptions apply. Players may hold more than one non-FIFA nationality.

No.	Pos.	Nation	Player
1	GK	HUN	Zsolt Sebők
6	DF	HUN	Krisztián Tamás
8	MF	HUN	Márk Madarász
9	FW	HUN	Norbert Tóth
10	FW	SEN	Bara Bebeto
11	DF	HUN	Ádám Présinger
12	GK	HUN	Edvárd Rusák
13	DF	HUN	Adrián Szekeres
17	FW	HUN	András Simon
18	DF	CRO	Anto Radeljić
19	FW	HUN	Patrik Vass
21	FW	HUN	János Máté
23	DF	HUN	Dániel Lengyel

No.	Pos.	Nation	Player
25	DF	MNE	Mijuško Bojović
27	MF	ROU	Szilárd Vereș
28	FW	HUN	Csanád Novák
29	DF	SVK	Kristián Kolčák
31	MF	HUN	Gábor Bori
32	MF	ROU	Sebastian Achim
34	MF	UKR	Volodymyr Tanchyk
46	MF	HUN	Ádám Simon
71	GK	UKR	Oleksandr Nad
85	DF	HUN	Vince Szegi
88	FW	HUN	Norbert Csiki
91	MF	HUN	Máté Kiss
93	MF	HUN	Roland Paku

== Transfers ==
=== Transfers in ===
Transfer window	Pos.	No.	Player	From
Summer	MF	18	(Hungary) Attila Filkor	Free agent (Note: Previous club Újpest.)
Summer	MF	20	(Hungary) Olivér Nagy	Szigetszentmiklós
Summer	DF	25	(Montenegro) Mijuško Bojović	(Cyprus) Enosis Neon Paralimni
Summer	MF	32	(Romania) Sebastian Achim	Free agent (Note: Previous club Universitatea Craiova.)
Summer	GK	33	(Hungary) Alex Hrabina	Free agent (Note: Previous club Szolnok.)
Summer	FW	88	(Hungary) Norbert Csiki	Free agent (Note: Previous club Sisaket.)
Winter	DF	6	(Hungary) Krisztián Tamás	(Italy) Spezia
Winter	FW	10	(Senegal) Bara Bebeto	(Cyprus) Doxa Katokopias
Winter	DF	18	(Croatia) Anto Radeljić	(Bosnia and Herzegovina) Zrinjski Mostar
Winter	DF	29	(Slovakia) Kristián Kolčák	(Slovakia) Ružomberok
Winter	MF	34	(Ukraine) Volodymyr Tanchyk	(Ukraine) Olimpik Donetsk
Winter	MF	67	(Hungary) Gergő Szalánszki	Újpest
Winter	FW	69	(Ukraine) Oleksiy Antonov	Free agent (Note: Previous club Gabala.)
Winter	GK	71	(Ukraine) Oleksandr Nad	Free agent (Note: Previous club Honvéd.)

=== Transfers out ===
Transfer window	Pos.	No.	Player	To
Summer	FW	7	(Hungary) Gergő Beliczky	Győr
Summer	DF	15	(Hungary) Dániel Völgyi	Debrecen
Summer	MF	21	(Hungary) Roland Bohner	Mosonmagyaróvár
Summer	DF	87	(Hungary) Róbert Varga	Released (Note: Joined Győr.)
Winter	DF	5	(Hungary) Sándor Nagy	Released (Note: Joined Cegléd.)
Winter	DF	6	(Hungary) Béla Balogh	Released (Note: Joined Mezőkövesd.)
Winter	FW	10	(Hungary) Attila Simon	Released (Note: Joined Dorog.)
Winter	MF	14	(Hungary) Bence Gyurján	Békéscsaba
Winter	MF	18	(Hungary) Attila Filkor	Released
Winter	MF	20	(Hungary) Olivér Nagy	Released (Note: Joined Soroksár.)
Winter	MF	22	(Hungary) Adrián Horváth	Released (Note: Joined Kisvárda.)
Winter	GK	33	(Hungary) Alex Hrabina	Békéscsaba

=== Loans in ===
Transfer window	Pos.	No.	Player	From	End date
Summer	FW	28	(Hungary) Csanád Novák	Vasas	End of season
Summer	FW	30	(Hungary) Dániel Sallói	(United States) Sporting Kansas City	Middle of season
Summer	MF	70	(Hungary) András Jancsó	Haladás	Middle of season
Winter	MF	27	(Romania) Szilárd Vereș	(Romania) CFR Cluj	End of season
Winter	MF	46	(Hungary) Ádám Simon	Videoton	End of season

=== Loans out ===
Transfer window	Pos.	No.	Player	To	End date
Summer	FW	21	(Hungary) János Máté	Balmazújváros	Middle of season
Winter	DF	90	(Hungary) Patrik Lázár	Mosonmagyaróvár	End of season

== Competitions ==
=== Overview ===
Competition	First match	Last match	Starting round	Final position	Record							
Competition	First match	Last match	Starting round	Final position	Pld	W	D	L	GF	GA	GD	Win %
Nemzeti Bajnokság I	16 July 2016	27 May 2017	Matchday 1	12th	33	5	9	19	21	51	−30	15.15
Magyar Kupa	14 September 2016	1 March 2017	Round of 128	Round of 16	5	3	2	0	13	3	+10	60.00
Total					38	8	11	19	34	54	−20	21.05

Source: Competitions

=== Nemzeti Bajnokság I ===
==== League table ====
Pos	Team	Pld	W	D	L	GF	GA	GD	Pts	Qualification or relegation
8	Debrecen	33	11	8	14	42	46	−4	41	
9	Mezőkövesd	33	10	10	13	39	54	−15	40	
10	Diósgyőr	33	10	7	16	39	58	−19	37	
11	MTK (R)	33	8	13	12	26	36	−10	37	Relegation to the Nemzeti Bajnokság II
12	Gyirmót (R)	33	5	9	19	21	51	−30	24	Relegation to the Nemzeti Bajnokság II

Source: Hungarian Football Federation (in Hungarian), Soccerway
Rules for classification: 1) Points; 2) Matches won; 3) Goal difference; 4) Goals scored; 5) Head-to-head points; 6) Head-to-head goal difference; 7) Head-to-head away goals scored; 8) Fairplay; 9) Draw.
(R) Relegated

==== Results summary ====
Overall								Home						Away					
Pld	W	D	L	GF	GA	GD	Pts	W	D	L	GF	GA	GD	W	D	L	GF	GA	GD
33	5	9	19	21	51	−30	24	3	3	10	10	23	−13	2	6	9	11	28	−17

Source: Hungarian Football Federation

==== Results by round ====
Round	1	2	3	4	5	6	7	8	9	10	11	12	13	14	15	16	17	18	19	20	21	22	23	24	25	26	27	28	29	30	31	32	33
Ground	A	H	A	H	A	H	A	H	A	H	A	H	A	H	A	H	A	H	A	H	A	H	A	H	A	H	A	H	A	H	A	H	A
Result	D	D	L	L	L	L	D	W	D	W	W	L	L	L	L	L	L	L	L	D	D	L	D	W	L	L	D	L	L	D	L	L	W
Position	5	6	10	11	12	12	12	12	12	11	9	10	10	10	11	12	12	12	12	12	12	12	12	12	12	12	12	12	12	12	12	12	12
Points	1	2	2	2	2	2	3	6	7	10	13	13	13	13	13	13	13	13	13	14	15	15	16	19	19	19	20	20	20	21	21	21	24

Source: Matches
A = Away; H = Home; W = Win; D = Draw; L = Loss

==== Matches ====
16 July 2016 1	Mezőkövesd	2–2	Gyirmót	Mezőkövesd
18:00 CEST (UTC+2)	Střeštík 23', 88'; Devecseri (yellow card) 64'	Report	Szegi (yellow card) 44'; Lengyel 66'; O. Nagy (yellow card) 83'; Vass 86'	Stadium: Városi Stadion; Attendance: 2,548; Referee: István Vad; Assistant referees: László Viszokai, Gábor Varga Jr. Fourth official: Gergely Becséri; Goal-line assistants: Ádám Németh, János Takács

24 July 2016 2	Gyirmót	0–0	MTK	Győr
18:00 CEST (UTC+2)	Lengyel (yellow card) 15'; Völgyi (yellow card) 83'	Report	Baki (yellow card) 59'	Stadium: Ménfői úti Stadion; Attendance: 2,200; Referee: József Erdős; Assistant referees: Péter Berettyán, Balázs Huszár; Fourth official: Balázs Farkas; Goal-line assistants: Péter Solymosi, Tamás Nazsa

31 July 2016 3	Debrecen	4–0	Gyirmót	Debrecen
18:00 CEST (UTC+2)	Z. Horváth 15'; Korhut 20'; Kuti (yellow card) 52'; Tisza 57'; Takács 69'	Report	Paku (yellow card) 13'; Filkor (yellow card) 23'; An. Simon (yellow card) 25'; S. Nagy (yellow card) 88'	Stadium: Nagyerdei Stadion; Attendance: 2,463; Referee: Zoltán Iványi; Assistant referees: Zsolt Szpisják, István Albert; Fourth official: János Medovarszki; Goal-line assistants: Sándor Andó-Szabó, László Lovas

7 August 2016 4	Gyirmót	0–4	Videoton	Győr
18:00 CEST (UTC+2)	Völgyi (yellow card) 62'	Report	Suljić (yellow card) 32'; Juhász 47'; Lazović 59'; Pátkai 75'; Feczesin 89'	Stadium: Ménfői úti Stadion; Attendance: 2,000; Referee: Ferenc Karakó; Assistant referees: Georgiou Theodoros, Balázs Huszár; Fourth official: Péter Kóbor; Goal-line assistants: Péter Solymosi, János Takács

13 August 2016 5	Újpest	3–1	Gyirmót	Budapest (Note: The match was played at the Illovszky Rudolf Stadion in Budapest, instead of Újpest regular stadium, the Szusza Ferenc Stadion in Budapest, due to the renovation work.)
18:00 CEST (UTC+2)	Kálnoki-Kis (yellow card) 57'; Andrić (yellow card) 64'; Bardhi 66', 71'; Balázs 68'; T. Nagy (yellow card) 75'	Report	Máté 3'; O. Nagy (yellow card) 67'	Stadium: Illovszky Rudolf Stadion; Attendance: 3,000; Referee: József Erdős; Assistant referees: Attila Kelemen, Tamás Márkus; Fourth official: Dr. Zsolt Varga; Goal-line assistants: Sándor Andó-Szabó, Róbert Nagy

17 August 2016 6	Gyirmót	0–1	Ferencváros	Győr
19:00 CEST (UTC+2)	Paku (yellow card) 60'	Report	Böde 18'; Ramírez (yellow card) 62'	Stadium: Ménfői úti Stadion; Attendance: 4,200; Referee: Gergely Szőts; Assistant referees: György Ring, Oszkár Lémon; Fourth official: Balázs Farkas; Goal-line assistants: Attila Molnár, Tibor Gyarmati II

21 August 2016 7	Honvéd	0–0	Gyirmót	Budapest
18:00 CEST (UTC+2)	Botka (yellow card) 39'; Gazdag (yellow card) 72'	Report	Présinger (yellow card) 38'; Paku (yellow card) 66'	Stadium: Bozsik József Stadion; Attendance: 1,180; Referee: Szabolcs Szilasi; Assistant referees: Péter Berettyán, Arnold Kepe; Fourth official: Balázs Huszár; Goal-line assistants: Csaba Pintér, Tibor Gyarmati II

10 September 2016 8	Gyirmót	1–0	Diósgyőr	Győr
18:00 CEST (UTC+2)	Bojović (yellow card) 66'; Sallói 74'	Report		Stadium: Ménfői úti Stadion; Attendance: 1,400; Referee: Sándor Andó-Szabó; Assistant referees: Attila Kelemen, Balázs Szert; Fourth official: Balázs Farkas; Goal-line assistants: Balázs Berke, Szabolcs Szilasi

17 September 2016 9	Paks	0–0	Gyirmót	Paks
18:30 CEST (UTC+2)		Report		Stadium: Fehérvári úti Stadion; Attendance: 623; Referee: Péter Solymosi; Assistant referees: Balázs Buzás, Dr. Zsolt Varga; Fourth official: Tamás Márkus; Goal-line assistants: Róbert Nagy, Tibor Gyarmati II

21 September 2016 10	Gyirmót	1–0	Vasas	Győr
19:00 CEST (UTC+2)	Bojović (yellow card) 44'; Filkor 51'; Achim (yellow card) 58'; Novák (red card) 64'; Jancsó (yellow card) 73'; S. Nagy (yellow card) 83'	Report	James (yellow card) 49'; Szivacski (yellow card) 69'; Remili (yellow card) 79'	Stadium: Ménfői úti Stadion; Attendance: 1,400; Referee: Zsolt Szabó; Assistant referees: Péter Berettyán, Péter Kóbor; Fourth official: Oszkár Lémon; Goal-line assistants: Szabolcs Szilasi, János Takács

24 September 2016 11	Haladás	0–1	Gyirmót	Sopron (Note: The match was played at the Káposztás utcai Stadion in Sopron, instead of Haladás regular stadium, the Rohonci út in Szombathely, which was demolished to make way to the newly built Haladás Sportkomplexum.)
18:00 CEST (UTC+2)	Bošnjak (yellow card) 10'; Halmosi (yellow card) 84'; Kovács (yellow card) 85'	Report	Sallói 41'; Csiki (yellow card) 48'	Stadium: Káposztás utcai Stadion; Attendance: 1,485; Referee: Zoltán Iványi; Assistant referees: Balázs Farkas, János Medovarszki; Fourth official: Gábor Kormányos II; Goal-line assistants: Gergely Szőts, Gábor Oláh

15 October 2016 12	Gyirmót	0–1	Mezőkövesd	Győr
15:30 CEST (UTC+2)	Vass (yellow card) 17'; Présinger (yellow card) 70'	Report	Szeles (yellow card) 49'; Diallo 90+2', (yellow card) 90+2'	Stadium: Ménfői úti Stadion; Attendance: 1,100; Referee: Ádám Farkas; Assistant referees: Attila Kelemen, Gábor Varga Jr. Fourth official: Péter Kóbor; Goal-line assistants: Balázs Berke, Ádám Németh

22 October 2016 13	MTK	1–0	Gyirmót	Budapest
18:00 CEST (UTC+2)	Okuka (yellow card) 22'; Torghelle 74'	Report		Stadium: Hidegkuti Nándor Stadion; Attendance: 1,183; Referee: Péter Solymosi; Assistant referees: Balázs Farkas, Dr. Zsolt Varga; Fourth official: Tamás Márkus; Goal-line assistants: Gábor Oláh, Péter Zierkelbach

29 October 2016 14	Gyirmót	1–2	Debrecen	Győr
18:00 CEST (UTC+2)	Achim (yellow card) 22'; Madarász 71'; Présinger (red card) 81'	Report	Vittek 9'; Holman 23'; Tőzsér (red card) 42'; Bobko (yellow card) 89'	Stadium: Ménfői úti Stadion; Attendance: 1,013; Referee: István Vad; Assistant referees: István Albert, Arnold Kepe; Fourth official: Gergely Becséri; Goal-line assistants: Csaba Pintér, Gyöngyi Gaál

5 November 2016 15	Videoton	4–0	Gyirmót	Felcsút (Note: The match was played at the Pancho Aréna in Felcsút, instead of Videoton regular stadium, the Sóstói Stadion in Székesfehérvár, built in 1967 which was demolished to make way to the newly built Sóstói Stadion.)
15:30 CET (UTC+1)	Feczesin 3', 34'; Šćepović 16', 59'	Report		Stadium: Pancho Aréna; Attendance: 1,461; Referee: Sándor Andó-Szabó; Assistant referees: Balázs Huszár, Péter Kóbor; Fourth official: Georgiou Theodoros; Goal-line assistants: Tamás Bognár, Tibor Gyarmati II

19 November 2016 16	Gyirmót	1–2	Újpest	Győr
15:30 CET (UTC+1)	Filkor (yellow card) 13'; Bojović 78'	Report	Diarra (yellow card) 13'; Windecker (yellow card) 67', (goal) 90+3'; G. Nagy (yellow card) 80'; Lázok 84'	Stadium: Ménfői úti Stadion; Attendance: 1,500; Referee: Gergely Szőts; Assistant referees: Oszkár Lémon, Krisztián Király; Fourth official: Gergely Becséri; Goal-line assistants: Ferenc Karakó, Eszter Urbán

26 November 2016 17	Ferencváros	2–0	Gyirmót	Budapest
15:30 CET (UTC+1)	Čukić (yellow card) 46'; Présinger 48' (o.g.); Djuricin 65'	Report	Présinger (yellow card) 87'	Stadium: Groupama Arena; Attendance: 5,613; Referee: Ferenc Karakó; Assistant referees: István Albert, Gábor Kormányos II; Fourth official: Balázs Buzás; Goal-line assistants: Tamás Bognár, Szabolcs Szilasi

3 December 2016 18	Gyirmót	0–4	Honvéd	Győr
15:30 CET (UTC+1)	Filkor (yellow card) 80'	Report	Prosser 49'; Holender 61'; Koszta (yellow card) 72'; Kamber 78'; Hidi 83'	Stadium: Ménfői úti Stadion; Attendance: 954; Referee: Csaba Pintér; Assistant referees: Krisztián Király, Gergely Becséri; Fourth official: Oszkár Lémon; Goal-line assistants: Sándor Andó-Szabó, Tibor Gyarmati II

10 December 2016 19	Diósgyőr	1–0	Gyirmót	Mezőkövesd (Note: The match was played at the Városi Stadion in Mezőkövesd, instead of Diósgyőr regular stadium, the Diósgyőri Stadion in Miskolc, opened in 1939 which was demolished to make way to the newly built Diósgyőri Stadion.)
15:30 CET (UTC+1)	Vela 16'; Bacsa (yellow card) 63'; Lipták (yellow card) 72'; Nemes (yellow card) 90+1'; Daushvili (yellow card) 90+3'; Ugrai (yellow card) 90+3'	Report	Présinger (yellow card) 61'; Sallói (yellow card) 63'	Stadium: Városi Stadion; Attendance: 1,569; Referee: Ádám Farkas; Assistant referees: Attila Kelemen, Gábor Varga Jr. Fourth official: Balázs Szert; Goal-line assistants: Péter Solymosi, József Ducsai

18 February 2017 20	Gyirmót	0–0	Paks	Győr
15:30 CET (UTC+1)	An. Simon (yellow card) 30'; Bori (yellow card) 65'	Report	Vernes (yellow card) 21'; Báló (yellow card) 67'	Stadium: Ménfői úti Stadion; Attendance: 764; Referee: Balázs Berke; Assistant referees: Balázs Huszár, Péter Kóbor; Fourth official: Gábor Varga Jr. Goal-line assistants: Szabolcs Szilasi, Tibor Gyarmati II

25 February 2017 21	Vasas	1–1	Gyirmót	Budapest (Note: The match was played at the Szusza Ferenc Stadion in Budapest, instead of Vasas regular stadium, the Illovszky Rudolf Stadion in Budapest, built in 1960 which was demolished to make way to the newly built Illovszky Rudolf Stadion.)
15:30 CET (UTC+1)	Vaskó (yellow card) 38'; Király 80'; Sağlık (yellow card) 90+3'	Report	Novák 25'; Á. Simon (yellow card) 27'; Vass (yellow card) 70'; Bebeto (yellow card) 81'	Stadium: Szusza Ferenc Stadion; Attendance: 2,350; Referee: Ferenc Karakó; Assistant referees: Balázs Buzás, Róbert Horváth; Fourth official: János Medovarszki; Goal-line assistants: Ádám Farkas, Gyöngyi Gaál

4 March 2017 22	Gyirmót	1–2	Haladás	Győr
15:30 CET (UTC+1)	Á. Simon (yellow card) 20'; Radeljić (yellow card) 71', (goal) 85'; Kiss (yellow card) 75'; Antonov (yellow card) 90+4'	Report	Halmosi 6'; Kovács 36'; Bošnjak (yellow card) 61'	Stadium: Ménfői úti Stadion; Attendance: 1,010; Referee: István Vad; Assistant referees: István Albert, János Medovarszki; Fourth official: Oszkár Lémon; Goal-line assistants: Gergely Szőts, Gyöngyi Gaál

11 March 2017 23	Mezőkövesd	1–1	Gyirmót	Mezőkövesd
15:30 CET (UTC+1)	Egerszegi (yellow card) 6'; Molnár 63'	Report	Bojović 22'; Bebeto (yellow card) 66'; Á. Simon (yellow card) 67'; An. Simon (yellow card) 68'	Stadium: Városi Stadion; Attendance: 1,518; Referee: Ádám Farkas; Assistant referees: Balázs Szert, Róbert Horváth; Fourth official: Gábor Varga Jr. Goal-line assistants: Péter Solymosi, Tibor Gyarmati II

1 April 2017 24	Gyirmót	1–0	MTK	Győr
18:00 CEST (UTC+2)	Á. Simon (yellow card) 45'; An. Simon 57'	Report	Grgić (yellow card) 8'; Baki (yellow card) 55'; Vogyicska (yellow card) 60'	Stadium: Ménfői úti Stadion; Attendance: 1,300; Referee: István Vad; Assistant referees: Vencel Tóth II, Gergely Becséri; Fourth official: Gábor Takács; Goal-line assistants: Szabolcs Szilasi, Gyöngyi Gaál

8 April 2017 25	Debrecen	2–1	Gyirmót	Debrecen
18:00 CEST (UTC+2)	Filip (yellow card) 10'; Brković 61', (red card) 66'; Mészáros 90+1'	Report	An. Simon 8'; Radeljić (yellow card) 33'; Madarász (yellow card) 85'	Stadium: Nagyerdei Stadion; Attendance: 2,237; Referee: Tamás Bognár; Assistant referees: István Albert, Balázs Farkas; Fourth official: János Medovarszki; Goal-line assistants: Ádám Németh, Róbert Nagy

12 April 2017 26	Gyirmót	0–1	Videoton	Győr
18:00 CEST (UTC+2)	Bojović (yellow card) 34'; Radeljić (yellow card) 51'; Antonov (yellow card) 86'; Bori (red card) 90+2'	Report	Šćepović 35'	Stadium: Ménfői úti Stadion; Attendance: 965; Referee: Gergely Szőts; Assistant referees: Georgiou Theodoros, Róbert Horváth; Fourth official: Balázs Huszár; Goal-line assistants: Balázs Berke, Tibor Gyarmati II

15 April 2017 27	Újpest	2–2	Gyirmót	Budapest
18:00 CEST (UTC+2)	Diarra 25', (yellow card) 76'; Bardhi 57'	Report	Bojović (yellow card) 17', (goal) 36'; Novák 55', (yellow card) 88'; Kolčák (yellow card) 59'; Á. Simon (yellow card) 77'; Nad (yellow card) 84'	Stadium: Szusza Ferenc Stadion; Attendance: 1,673; Referee: Csaba Pintér; Assistant referees: László Viszokai, Péter Kóbor; Fourth official: Balázs Huszár; Goal-line assistants: Sándor Andó-Szabó, Péter Zierkelbach

22 April 2017 28	Gyirmót	2–3	Ferencváros	Győr
18:00 CEST (UTC+2)	Novák 21'; Szegi (yellow card) 22'; Á. Simon (yellow card) 38'; Tamás 77'	Report	Gera 36', 38', 61'; Sternberg (yellow card) 73'; Hüsing (yellow card) 78'	Stadium: Ménfői úti Stadion; Attendance: 1,952; Referee: István Vad; Assistant referees: György Ring, Gábor Takács; Fourth official: Balázs Farkas; Goal-line assistants: Péter Solymosi, Gergő Bogár

29 April 2017 29	Honvéd	1–0	Gyirmót	Budapest
18:00 CEST (UTC+2)	D. Bobál (yellow card) 32'; Gazdag (yellow card) 83'; Lanzafame 90+5', (yellow card) 90+5'	Report	Radeljić (yellow card) 26'; Vass (yellow card) 41'; Nad (yellow card) 58'; Á. Simon (yellow card) 59'; An. Simon (yellow card) 80'	Stadium: Bozsik József Stadion; Attendance: 2,347; Referee: Gergely Szőts; Assistant referees: Péter Berettyán, János Medovarszki; Fourth official: Dániel Szalai; Goal-line assistants: Zoltán Iványi, Gyöngyi Gaál

6 May 2017 30	Gyirmót	1–1	Diósgyőr	Győr
18:00 CEST (UTC+2)	An. Simon (yellow card) 28'; Radeljić 90+3'	Report	Makrai 2'; Karan (yellow card) 34'; Novothny (yellow card) 67'	Stadium: Ménfői úti Stadion; Attendance: 1,150; Referee: Ferenc Karakó; Assistant referees: Gábor Varga Jr., Balázs Szert; Fourth official: Péter Kóbor; Goal-line assistants: Szabolcs Szilasi, Tibor Gyarmati II

13 May 2017 31	Paks	3–0	Gyirmót	Paks
18:00 CEST (UTC+2)	Bartha 20'; Szakály 25', 31'; Lenzsér (yellow card) 75'; Báló (yellow card) 90'	Report	Kiss (yellow card) 51'	Stadium: Fehérvári úti Stadion; Attendance: 600; Referee: Tamás Bognár; Assistant referees: Oszkár Lémon, Balázs Farkas; Fourth official: Balázs Huszár; Goal-line assistants: Szabolcs Szilasi, Gyöngyi Gaál

20 May 2017 32	Gyirmót	1–2	Vasas	Győr
18:00 CEST (UTC+2)	Radeljić (yellow card) 42'; Présinger (yellow card) 53'; Csiki 55'; Szalánszki (red card) 79'; Bojović (yellow card) 90+2'	Report	Kulcsár 9'; Berecz 67'	Stadium: Ménfői úti Stadion; Attendance: 500; Referee: Péter Solymosi

27 May 2017 33	Haladás	1–2	Gyirmót	Sopron
19:00 CEST (UTC+2)	Williams 65'; Má. Tóth (yellow card) 70'; B. Kiss (yellow card) 76'; Jagodics (yellow card) 88'	Report	Szegi 7', (yellow card) 51'; An. Simon (yellow card) 34'; Kolčák (yellow card) 63'; Máté 72'	Stadium: Káposztás utcai Stadion; Attendance: 1,785; Referee: Szabolcs Szilasi; Assistant referees: Gábor Takács, Oszkár Lémon; Fourth official: József Aradi; Goal-line assistants: Péter Solymosi, Tibor Gyarmati II

=== Magyar Kupa ===
14 September 2016 Round of 128	Zalakomár	0–7	Gyirmót	Zalakomár
15:30 CEST (UTC+2)		Report	Jancsó 34'; Tóth 41'; Paku 45'; Borkai 52'; Présinger (yellow card) 58', (goal) 90+1'; Szegi 61', 83'	Stadium: Zalakomár Sportpálya; Attendance: 600; Referee: Tibor Farkas; Assistant referees: Gábor Kovács, Miklós Fehér

26 October 2016 Round of 64	Mosonmagyaróvár	2–3	Gyirmót	Mosonmagyaróvár
13:30 CEST (UTC+2)	Baranyai 28', (yellow card) 87'; Balázs 39'	Report	At. Simon 22'; Szegi 40'; Vass 44'	Stadium: Wittmann Antal park Attendance: 500; Referee: Szabolcs Szilasi; Assistant referees: Oszkár Lémon, Milán Mohos

30 November 2016 Round of 32	Kecskemét	0–2	Gyirmót	Kecskemét
16:00 CET (UTC+1)	Nádudvari (yellow card) 90+1'	Report	At. Simon 2'; Madarász 22'; Paku (yellow card) 48'; An. Simon (yellow card) 90+2'	Stadium: Széktói Stadion; Attendance: 600; Referee: László Lovas; Assistant referees: Balázs Buzás, János Medovarszki; Fourth official: Tamás Takács

==== Round of 16 ====
11 February 2017 First leg	Mezőkövesd	0–0	Gyirmót	Mezőkövesd
14:00 CET (UTC+1)	Hudák (yellow card) 46'; Tóth (yellow card) 65'	Report	Bebeto (yellow card) 49'	Stadium: Városi Stadion; Attendance: 980; Referee: József Erdős; Assistant referees: Vencel Tóth II, Balázs Szert; Fourth official: Ádám Farkas

1 March 2017 Second leg	Gyirmót	1–1 (1–1 (a) agg.)	Mezőkövesd	Győr
14:30 CET (UTC+1)	Vereș (yellow card) 44'; An. Simon 76'	Report	Hudák 63'; Egerszegi (yellow card) 66'	Stadium: Ménfői úti Stadion; Attendance: 300; Referee: Sándor Andó-Szabó; Assistant referees: Balázs Farkas, Gergely Becséri; Fourth official: Gábor Oláh
Note: 1–1 on aggregate. Mezőkövesd won on away goals.

== Statistics ==
=== Overall ===
Appearances (Apps) numbers are for appearances in competitive games only, including sub appearances.
Source: Competitions

No.	Player	Pos.	Nemzeti Bajnokság I				Magyar Kupa				Total			
No.	Player	Pos.	Apps	Goal	Booked	Sent off (straight red)	Apps	Goal	Booked	Sent off (straight red)	Apps	Goal	Booked	Sent off (straight red)
1	(Hungary) Zsolt Sebők	GK	23								23			
5	(Hungary) Sándor Nagy	DF	6		2		3				9		2	
6	(Hungary) Béla Balogh	DF	7								7			
6	(Hungary) Krisztián Tamás	DF	7	1			1				8	1		
7	(Hungary) Gergő Beliczky	FW	2								2			
7	(Hungary) Zoltán Farkas	FW	2								2			
8	(Hungary) Márk Madarász	MF	27	1	1		4	1			31	2	1	
9	(Hungary) Norbert Tóth	FW	6				2	1			8	1		
10	(Senegal) Bara Bebeto	FW	6		2		1		1		7		3	
10	(Hungary) Attila Simon	FW	6				2	2			8	2		
11	(Hungary) Ádám Présinger	DF	21		5	1	3	1	1		24	1	6	1
12	(Hungary) Edvárd Rusák	GK	2				4				6			
13	(Hungary) Adrián Szekeres	DF	1								1			
14	(Hungary) Ádám Borkai	DF	1				1	1			2	1		
14	(Hungary) Bence Gyurján	MF	5				2				7			
15	(Hungary) Mózes Aranyos	MF												
15	(Hungary) Dániel Völgyi	DF	4		2						4		2	
16	(Hungary) Tibor Szabó	FW	1				2				3			
17	(Hungary) András Simon	FW	22	2	6		3	1	1		25	3	7	
18	(Hungary) Attila Filkor	MF	16	1	3		1				17	1	3	
18	(Croatia) Anto Radeljić	DF	12	2	5		2				14	2	5	
19	(Hungary) Patrik Vass	FW	20	1	3		3	1			23	2	3	
20	(Hungary) Olivér Nagy	MF	9		2		3				12		2	
21	(Hungary) János Máté	FW	11	2							11	2		
22	(Hungary) Adrián Horváth	MF	2				1				3			
23	(Hungary) Dániel Lengyel	DF	7	1	1		1				7	1	1	
25	(Montenegro) Mijuško Bojović	DF	22	3	5		1				23	3	5	
27	(Romania) Szilárd Vereș	MF	3				1		1		4		1	
28	(Hungary) Csanád Novák	FW	18	3	1	1	3				21	3	1	1
29	(Slovakia) Kristián Kolčák	DF	11		2		2				13		2	
30	(Hungary) Dániel Sallói	FW	13	2	1						13	2	1	
31	(Hungary) Gábor Bori	MF	15		1	1	1				16		1	1
32	(Romania) Sebastian Achim	MF	20		2		2				22		2	
33	(Hungary) Alex Hrabina	GK												
34	(Ukraine) Volodymyr Tanchyk	MF	3				2				5			
46	(Hungary) Ádám Simon	MF	10		7						10		7	
67	(Hungary) Gergő Szalánszki	MF	3			1					3			1
69	(Ukraine) Oleksiy Antonov	FW	5		2		1				6		2	
70	(Hungary) András Jancsó	MF	11		1		2	1			13	1	1	
71	(Ukraine) Oleksandr Nad	GK	9		2		1				10		2	
85	(Hungary) Vince Szegi	DF	14	1	3		5	3			19	4	3	
88	(Hungary) Norbert Csiki	FW	23	1	1		1				24	1	1	
90	(Hungary) Patrik Lázár	DF	6				3				9			
91	(Hungary) Máté Kiss	MF	32		2		3				35		2	
93	(Hungary) Roland Paku	MF	15		3		3	1	1		18	1	4	
97	(Hungary) Zsolt Kovács	FW	1								1			
Own goals														
Totals				21	65	4		13	5			34	70	4

=== Clean sheets ===
			Clean sheets		
No.	Player	Games Played	Nemzeti Bajnokság I	Magyar Kupa	Total
1	(Hungary) Zsolt Sebők	23	8		8
71	(Ukraine) Oleksandr Nad	10	1	1	2
12	(Hungary) Edvárd Rusák	6		2	2
33	(Hungary) Alex Hrabina				
Totals			9	3	12
