= Zoran Milovac =

Serbian footballer

Personal information
- Full name: Zoran Milovac
- Date of birth: 29 October 1988 (age 38)
- Place of birth: Novi Sad, SFR Yugoslavia
- Height: 1.82 m (6 ft 0 in)
- Position: Midfielder

Youth career
- Novi Sad

Senior career*
Years	Team	Apps	(Gls)
2004–2006	Novi Sad	38	(8)
2006–2010	OFK Beograd	53	(4)
2007	→ Mačva Šabac (loan)	4	(1)
2008	→ ČSK Čelarevo (loan)	16	(0)
2010	→ Inđija (loan)	13	(3)
2010–2012	Novi Sad	48	(13)
2012–2013	Voždovac	29	(8)
2013	BSK Borča	10	(0)
2014	Modriča		
2015	OFK Bačka	28	(5)
2016	Sutjeska Nikšić	13	(3)
2016	OFK Bačka	12	(0)
2017	Pajde Möhlin	25	(7)
2018	Borac Šajkaš		
2018	Sloga Temerin		
2019	OFK Futog		
2020	Novi Sad		

International career
2004–2005	Serbia and Montenegro U17 (Note: Only official UEFA matches included)	6	(0)
2006	Serbia U19	5	(1)
- * Club domestic league appearances and goals as of 29 December 2020

Zoran Milovac (Serbian Cyrillic: Зоран Миловац; born 29 October 1988) is a Serbian professional footballer player who plays as a midfielder.

== Club career ==
Milovac began his career at his hometown club, Novi Sad, before transferring to OFK Beograd in the summer of 2006, alongside Stojan Pilipović. He made substitute appearances in both legs against Auxerre in the 2006–07 UEFA Cup second qualifying round. While at Karaburma, Milovac was also sent out on loan to Mačva Šabac, ČSK Čelarevo, and Inđija.

In the summer of 2010, Milovac returned to Novi Sad, making 48 appearances and scoring 13 goals in the Serbian First League over the following two seasons.

== International career ==
At the international level, Milovac was selected to represent the Serbia at the 2007 UEFA European Under-19 Championship, but he did not appear in any matches during the tournament. He also participated in the 2009 Summer Universiade, which was hosted in Serbia.

== Honours ==
Inđija

- Serbian First League: 2009–10
