= Krisztián Póti =

Hungarian footballer (born 1988)

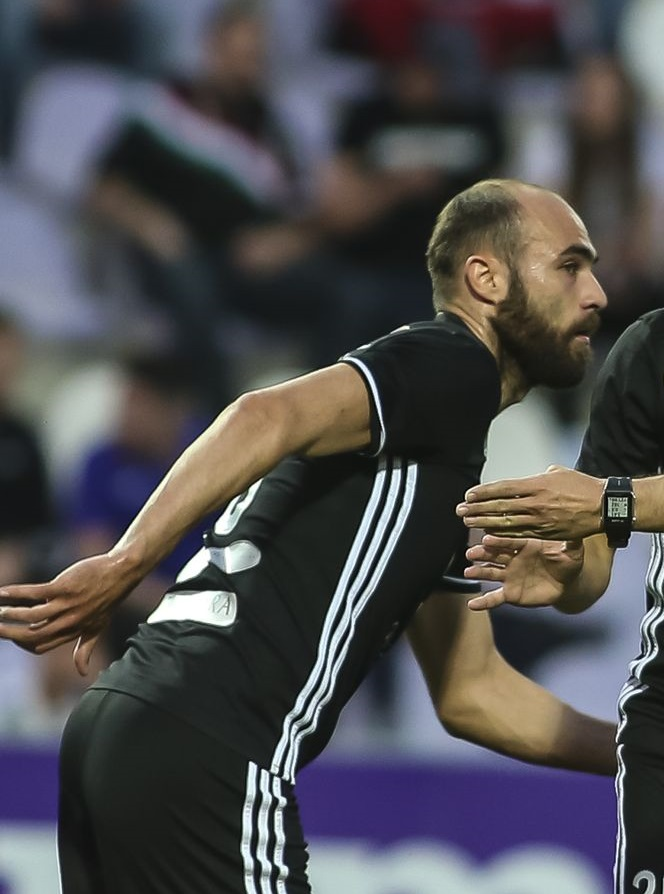
- Póti playing for Balmazújváros in 2018

Personal information
- Full name: Krisztián Póti
- Date of birth: 28 May 1988 (age 38)
- Place of birth: Mátészalka, Hungary
- Height: 1.90 m (6 ft 3 in)
- Position: Centre back

Team information
- Current team: ESMTK
- Number: 5

Youth career
- 2002–2003: Szent István
- 2003–2004: Fót
- 2004–2006: Szent István
- 2006–2007: Rákospalota

Senior career*
| Years | Team | Apps | (Gls) |
| 2007–2008 | Tököl | 11 | (0) |
| 2008–2009 | Jászberény | 22 | (0) |
| 2009 | Bőcs | 10 | (0) |
| 2009–2010 | Győr II | 7 | (0) |
| 2010–2011 | Hajdúböszörmény | 31 | (3) |
| 2011–2012 | MTK | 0 | (0) |
| 2012–2014 | Kecskemét | 44 | (1) |
| 2014 | Nyíregyháza | 3 | (0) |
| 2015–2016 | Szigetszentmiklós | 12 | (2) |
| 2016–2017 | Csákvár | 16 | (0) |
| 2017 | Sopron | 4 | (0) |
| 2017–2018 | Balmazújváros | 16 | (0) |
| 2018–2019 | Monori | 2 | (0) |
| 2019 | Ceglédi | 6 | (0) |
| 2020– | ESMTK | 34 | (0) |
- * Club domestic league appearances and goals as of 7 February 2022

Krisztián Póti (born 28 May 1988 in Budapest) is a Hungarian football player who currently plays for ESMTK.

== Career statistics ==
Appearances and goals by club, season and competition
| Club | Season | League | | | Cup | | League Cup | | Europe | | Total | |
| Club | Season | Division | Apps | Goals | Apps | Goals | Apps | Goals | Apps | Goals | Apps | Goals |
|---|---|---|---|---|---|---|---|---|---|---|---|---|
| Tököl | 2007–08 | Nemzeti Bajnokság II | 11 | 0 | 0 | 0 | — | | — | | 11 | 0 |
Jászberény
| Jászberény | 2007–08 | Nemzeti Bajnokság II | 12 | 0 | 0 | 0 | — | | — | | 12 | 0 |
| Jászberény | 2008–09 | Nemzeti Bajnokság II | 10 | 0 | 1 | 0 | — | | — | | 11 | 0 |
| Jászberény | Total | | 22 | 0 | 1 | 0 | — | | — | | 23 | 0 |
| Bőcs | 2008–09 | Nemzeti Bajnokság II | 10 | 0 | 0 | 0 | 2 | 0 | — | | 12 | 0 |
| Győr II | 2009–10 | Nemzeti Bajnokság II | 7 | 0 | 1 | 0 | — | | — | | 8 | 0 |
Hajdúböszörmény
| Hajdúböszörmény | 2009–10 | Nemzeti Bajnokság II | 8 | 1 | 0 | 0 | — | | — | | 8 | 1 |
| Hajdúböszörmény | 2010–11 | Nemzeti Bajnokság II | 23 | 2 | 1 | 0 | — | | — | | 24 | 2 |
| Hajdúböszörmény | Total | | 31 | 3 | 1 | 0 | — | | — | | 32 | 3 |
| MTK Budapest | 2011–12 | Nemzeti Bajnokság I | 0 | 0 | 0 | 0 | 1 | 0 | — | | 1 | 0 |
Kecskemét
| Kecskemét | 2011–12 | Nemzeti Bajnokság I | 2 | 0 | 0 | 0 | 1 | 0 | — | | 3 | 0 |
| Kecskemét | 2012–13 | Nemzeti Bajnokság I | 19 | 0 | 1 | 0 | 2 | 0 | — | | 22 | 0 |
| Kecskemét | 2013–14 | Nemzeti Bajnokság I | 24 | 1 | 1 | 0 | 4 | 1 | — | | 29 | 2 |
| Kecskemét | Total | | 46 | 1 | 2 | 0 | 7 | 1 | — | | 55 | 2 |
| Nyíregyháza | 2014–15 | Nemzeti Bajnokság I | 3 | 0 | 2 | 0 | 1 | 0 | — | | 6 | 0 |
Szigetszentmiklós
| Szigetszentmiklós | 2014–15 | Nemzeti Bajnokság II | 6 | 1 | 0 | 0 | — | | — | | 6 | 1 |
| Szigetszentmiklós | 2015–16 | Nemzeti Bajnokság II | 6 | 1 | 0 | 0 | — | | — | | 6 | 1 |
| Szigetszentmiklós | Total | | 12 | 2 | 0 | 0 | — | | — | | 12 | 2 |
| Csákvár | 2016–17 | Nemzeti Bajnokság II | 16 | 0 | 1 | 0 | — | | — | | 17 | 0 |
| Sopron | 2016–17 | Nemzeti Bajnokság II | 11 | 0 | 4 | 0 | — | | — | | 15 | 0 |
| Balmazújváros | 2017–18 | Nemzeti Bajnokság I | 15 | 0 | 4 | 0 | — | | — | | 19 | 0 |
| Career total | | | 184 | 6 | 16 | 0 | 11 | 1 | 0 | 0 | 211 | 7 |

Updated to games played as of 17 April 2018.
