= Szilárd Vereș =

Romanian footballer

Personal information
- Full name: Szilárd Vereș
- Date of birth: 27 January 1996 (age 30)
- Place of birth: Cluj-Napoca, Romania
- Height: 1.82 m (6 ft 0 in)
- Position: Midfielder

Team information
- Current team: FK Csíkszereda
- Number: 8

Youth career
- 2005–2014: CFR Cluj

Senior career*
| Years | Team | Apps | (Gls) |
| 2014–2018 | CFR Cluj | 15 | (0) |
| 2017 | → Gyirmót (loan) | 3 | (0) |
| 2017–2018 | → Național Sebiș (loan) | | |
| 2018–2020 | FK Csíkszereda | 18 | (1) |
| 2020–2022 | Mioveni | 52 | (2) |
| 2022– | FK Csíkszereda | 116 | (4) |

International career
| 2015 | Romania U21 | 1 | (0) |
- * Club domestic league appearances and goals as of 24 October 2026

Szilárd Vereș (born 27 January 1996) is a Romanian professional footballer who plays as a midfielder for Liga I club FK Csíkszereda, which he captains.

== Honours ==
CFR Cluj

- Cupa României: 2015–16

FK Csíkszereda

- Liga III: 2018–19
