= Csanád Novák =

Hungarian footballer

Personal information
- Full name: Csanád Ákos Novák
- Date of birth: 24 September 1994 (age 32)
- Place of birth: Tapolca, Hungary
- Height: 2.00 m (6 ft 7 in)
- Position: Forward

Team information
- Current team: Szeged
- Number: 19

Youth career
- 2009–2011: Pápa
- 2011–2013: Győr

Senior career*
Years	Team	Apps	(Gls)
2013–2014	Győr	1	(0)
2013–2014	→ Győr II	15	(7)
2014–2015	Kecskemét	26	(5)
2015–2017	Vasas	27	(2)
2016–2017	→ Gyirmót (loan)	18	(3)
2017–2020	Mezőkövesd	19	(1)
2018–2019	→ ZTE (loan)	30	(5)
2019	→ Haladás (loan)	16	(3)
2020	→ Szolnok (loan)	6	(3)
2020–2021	Szolnok	33	(17)
2021–2024	Nyíregyháza	95	(27)
2024–	Szeged	51	(21)

International career
2014	Hungary U-20	1	(0)
2014–2015	Hungary U-21	4	(1)
- * Club domestic league appearances and goals as of 31 May 2026

Csanád Ákos Novák (born 24 September 1994) is a Hungarian football player who plays for Szeged.

== Career statistics ==
Appearances and goals by club, season and competition
Club	Season	League			Cup		League Cup		Europe		Total	
Club	Season	Division	Apps	Goals	Apps	Goals	Apps	Goals	Apps	Goals	Apps	Goals
Győr	2012–13	Nemzeti Bajnokság I	1	0	0	0	0	0	1	0	2	0
Kecskemét	2014–15	Nemzeti Bajnokság I	26	5	3	3	5	1	0	0	34	9
Vasas
Vasas	2015–16	Nemzeti Bajnokság I	23	2	1	0	—		—		24	2
Vasas	2016–17	Nemzeti Bajnokság I	4	0	0	0	—		—		4	0
Vasas	Total		27	2	1	0	0	0	0	0	28	2
Gyirmót	2016–17	Nemzeti Bajnokság I	18	3	4	0	—		—		22	3
Mezőkövesd	2017–18	Nemzeti Bajnokság I	14	1	1	1	—		—		15	2
Career total			86	11	9	4	6	1	0	0	101	16

Updated to games played as of 28 April 2018.
