= Vukašin Poleksić =

Montenegrin footballer

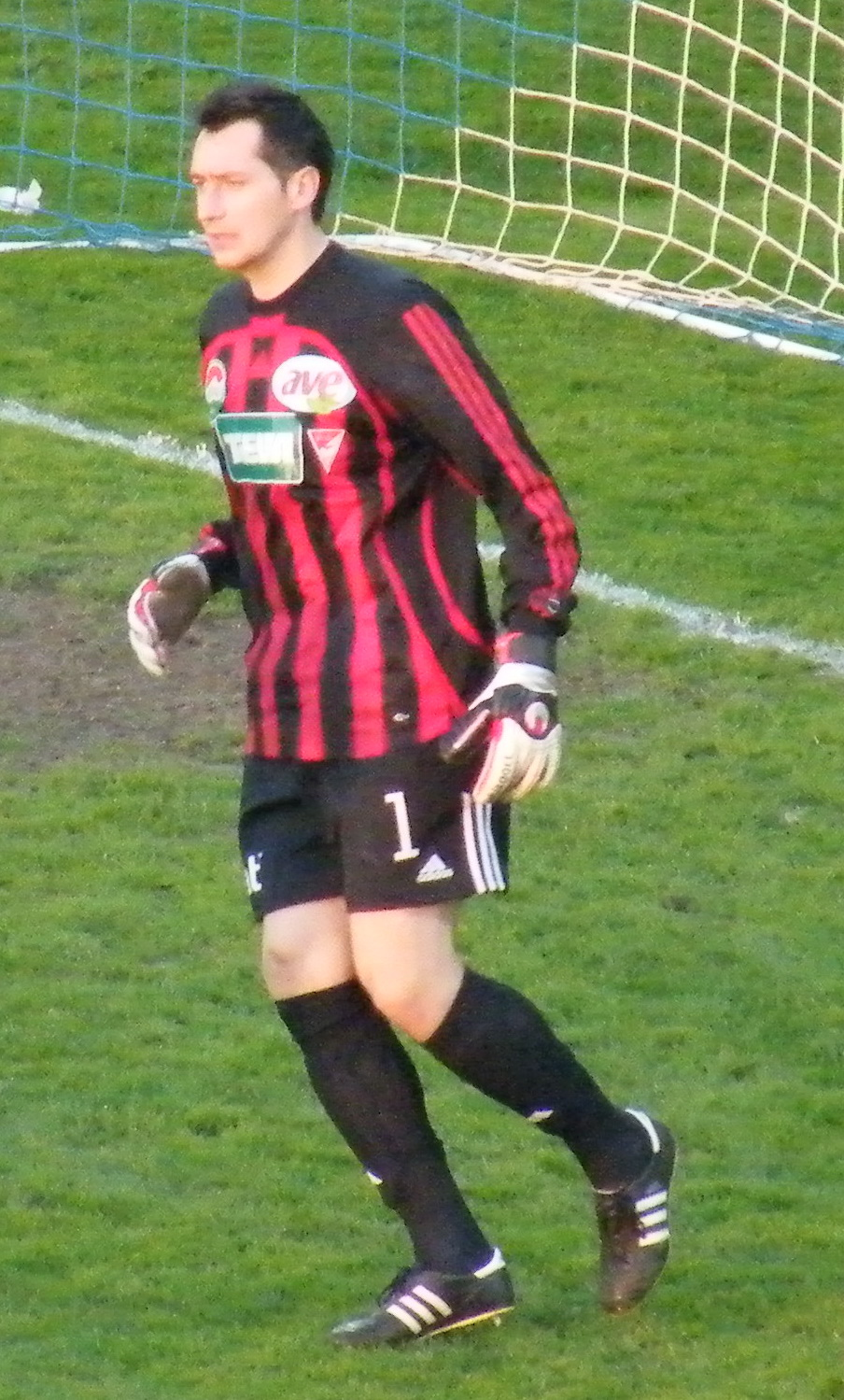

Personal information
- Full name: Vukašin Poleksić
- Date of birth: 30 August 1982 (age 44)
- Place of birth: Nikšić, SFR Yugoslavia
- Height: 1.91 m (6 ft 3 in)
- Position: Goalkeeper

Senior career*
Years	Team	Apps	(Gls)
1999–2003	Sutjeska Nikšić	56	(0)
2000	→ Čelik Nikšić (loan)	6	(0)
2002–2003	→ US Lecce (loan)	0	(0)
2003–2005	US Lecce	8	(0)
2005–2006	Sutjeska Nikšić	12	(0)
2006–2008	Tatabánya	52	(0)
2008–2014	Debrecen	69	(1)
2014	→ Kecskemét (loan)	10	(0)
2014–2015	Pécs	22	(0)
2015–2016	Sutjeska Nikšić	13	(0)
2016–2017	Békéscsaba	13	(0)
2016–2017	→ Vasas (loan)	4	(0)

International career^{‡}
2002	FR Yugoslavia	1	(0)
2007–2016	Montenegro	38	(0)
- * Club domestic league appearances and goals as of 3 October 2020 ‡ National team caps and goals as of 11 October 2015

Vukašin Poleksić (Serbian Cyrillic: Bукaшин Пoлeкcић, born 30 August 1982) is a Montenegrin retired football goalkeeper.

== Club career ==
Poleksić started his career at FK Sutjeska Nikšić, breaking into the first team in 2000. During this time he also spent time on loan at U.S. Lecce, and eventually joined them on a free transfer. After a brief second spell with FK Sutjeska Nikšić, he joined Hungarian Championship side FC Tatabánya. In 2007/08 he joined Debreceni VSC, and became their first-choice goalkeeper for the next 3 seasons.

On 24 June 2010 Poleksić was banned from all football activities until 30 June 2012 for failing to report an attempted match fixing. Investigations showed these attempts failed, and the offers had been rejected by Poleksić, however UEFA rules state all players and officials must report any match fixing attempt. On 5 May 2011 the Court of Arbitration for Sport rejected the appeal and upheld UEFA decision.

In 2014, he joined Kecskeméti TE on loan. After one season at Pécsi Mecsek FC, he returned to his hometown club FK Sutjeska Nikšić.

== International career ==
In 2002, he made his debut for FR Yugoslavia against Ecuador. He continued his international career for the newly formed Montenegro making his debut in his country's first ever competitive match on 24 March 2007, a friendly against Hungary in Podgorica. He has earned a total of 38 caps, scoring no goals. His final international was a May 2016 friendly match against Turkey.
