= Stojan Pilipović =

Serbian footballer

Personal information
- Full name: Stojan Pilipović
- Date of birth: 2 February 1987 (age 39)
- Place of birth: Titov Vrbas, SFR Yugoslavia
- Height: 1.78 m (5 ft 10 in)
- Position: Midfielder

Youth career
- Novi Sad

Senior career*
Years	Team	Apps	(Gls)
2003–2006	Novi Sad	30	(3)
2004–2005	→ Šajkaš Kovilj (loan)	28	(3)
2006–2007	OFK Beograd	16	(0)
2007	→ Mačva Šabac (loan)	8	(0)
2007	→ Borac Čačak (loan)	8	(0)
2008	Novi Sad	32	(3)
2009–2011	Banat Zrenjanin	51	(0)
2010	→ Okzhetpes (loan)	16	(2)
2011–2013	Sloboda Užice	61	(3)
2014	OFK Beograd	10	(0)
2014	Kecskemét	5	(0)
2015	Kolubara	13	(1)
2015	Bačka Palanka	0	(0)
2016–2020	Dunav Prahovo		

International career
2003–2004	Serbia and Montenegro U17 (Note: Only official UEFA matches included)	5	(3)
2005–2006	Serbia and Montenegro U19	4	(0)
- * Club domestic league appearances and goals as of 11 September 2019

Stojan Pilipović (Serbian Cyrillic: Стојан Пилиповић; born 2 February 1987) is a Serbian retired footballer who played as a midfielder.

== Club career ==
Pilipović made his senior debut with Novi Sad, before transferring to OFK Beograd in the summer of 2006, alongside Zoran Milovac. He started in both matches against Auxerre in the 2006–07 UEFA Cup second qualifying round, scoring a goal in the return leg. During his time at Karaburma, Pilipović was also sent on loan spells to Mačva Šabac and Borac Čačak.

After playing for Sloboda Mrkonjić Grad in Bosnia and Herzegovina, Pilipović returned to his country and joined Serbian League East side Dunav Prahovo in the summer of 2016. He left the club after one season.

== International career ==
At international level, Pilipović was capped for Serbia and Montenegro at under-17 and under-19 levels.
