= Gyula Forró =

Hungarian footballer

Personal information
- Date of birth: 6 June 1988 (age 38)
- Place of birth: Budapest, Hungary
- Height: 1.82 m (6 ft 0 in)
- Position: Left back

Team information
- Current team: Tatabánya
- Number: 23

Youth career
- 2002–2003: Tótkomlós
- 2003–2005: Békéscsaba
- 2005–2007: MTK Budapest

Senior career*
Years	Team	Apps	(Gls)
2007–2011	MTK Budapest	0	(0)
2007–2008	→ Soroksár (loan)	4	(0)
2008	→ Dabas (loan)	13	(1)
2008–2009	→ BKV Előre (loan)	27	(1)
2009–2011	→ MTK Budapest II	39	(2)
2011–2014	Kecskemét	59	(3)
2014–2016	Újpest	33	(0)
2016–2017	Puskás	21	(0)
2017–2019	Nyíregyháza	42	(0)
2019–2020	Dorog	21	(0)
2020–2021	Győr	4	(0)
2021–2022	SV St. Johann/Haide		
2022–	Tatabánya	53	

International career
2014	Hungary	3	(0)
- * Club domestic league appearances and goals as of 10 June 2025

Gyula Forró (born 6 June 1988) is a Hungarian football player who plays for Tatabánya.

== Career statistics ==
As of 7 February 2022

Appearances and goals by club, season and competition
Club	Season	League			Cup		Continental		Other		Total	
Club	Season	Division	Apps	Goals	Apps	Goals	Apps	Goals	Apps	Goals	Apps	Goals
Soroksár	2007–08	Nemzeti Bajnokság II	4	0	1	1	—		—		5	1
Dabas	2007–08	Nemzeti Bajnokság III	13	1	2	1	—		—		15	2
BKV Előre	2008–09	Nemzeti Bajnokság II	27	1	0	0	—		—		27	1
MTK Budapest II	2009–10	Nemzeti Bajnokság II	17	1	3	1	—		—		20	2
MTK Budapest II	2010–11	Nemzeti Bajnokság II	22	1	2	0	—		—		24	1
MTK Budapest II	Total		39	2	5	1	0	0	0	0	44	3
MTK Budapest	2009–10	Nemzeti Bajnokság I	0	0	0	0	—		5	1	5	1
MTK Budapest	2010–11	Nemzeti Bajnokság I	0	0	0	0	—		3	0	3	0
MTK Budapest	Total		0	0	0	0	0	0	8	1	8	1
Kecskemét II	2011–12	Nemzeti Bajnokság III	14	6	2	0	—		—		16	6
Kecskemét II	2012–13	Nemzeti Bajnokság III	4	0	—		—		—		4	0
Kecskemét II	Total		18	6	2	0	0	0	0	0	20	6
Kecskemét	2011–12	Nemzeti Bajnokság I	7	0	2	0	—		2	0	11	0
Kecskemét	2012–13	Nemzeti Bajnokság I	26	1	1	0	—		3	0	30	1
Kecskemét	2013–14	Nemzeti Bajnokság I	26	2	0	0	—		3	0	29	2
Kecskemét	Total		59	3	3	0	0	0	8	0	70	3
Újpest	2014–15	Nemzeti Bajnokság I	29	0	6	0	—		5	0	40	0
Újpest	2015–16	Nemzeti Bajnokság I	4	0	3	0	—		—		7	0
Újpest	Total		33	0	9	0	0	0	5	0	47	0
Újpest II	2015–16	Nemzeti Bajnokság III	5	0	—		—		—		5	0
Puskás Akadémia	2015–16	Nemzeti Bajnokság I	11	0	0	0	—		—		11	0
Puskás Akadémia	2016–17	Nemzeti Bajnokság I	10	0	2	0	—		—		12	0
Puskás Akadémia	Total		21	0	2	0	0	0	0	0	23	0
Puskás Akadémia II	2016–17	Nemzeti Bajnokság III	8	1	—		—		—		8	1
Nyíregyháza	2017–18	Nemzeti Bajnokság II	14	0	1	0	—		—		15	0
Nyíregyháza	2018–19	Nemzeti Bajnokság II	28	0	0	0	—		—		28	0
Nyíregyháza	Total		42	0	1	0	0	0	0	0	43	0
Dorog	2019–20	Nemzeti Bajnokság II	21	0	3	0	—		—		24	0
Győr	2020–21	Nemzeti Bajnokság II	4	0	0	0	—		—		4	0
Career total			294	14	28	3	0	0	21	1	343	18
