= Kristóf Polyák =

Hungarian footballer

Personal information
- Full name: Kristóf Pál Polyák
- Date of birth: 28 September 1995 (age 31)
- Place of birth: Kecskemét, Hungary
- Height: 1.74 m (5 ft 9 in)
- Position: Left back

Team information
- Current team: Cegléd
- Number: 13

Youth career
- 2007–2010: Kecskemét
- 2010–2014: Honvéd

Senior career*
| Years | Team | Apps | (Gls) |
| 2014–2015 | Kecskemét | 3 | (0) |
| 2015–2016 | SZTK | 2 | (0) |
| 2016 | Cegléd | 4 | (0) |
| 2016–2020 | Tiszakécske | 66 | (1) |
| 2020 | Kecskemét | 2 | (0) |
| 2020– | Cegléd | 20 | (0) |
- * Club domestic league appearances and goals as of 19:18, 30 November 2020 (UTC)

Kristóf Polyák (born 28 September 1995 in Kecskemét) is a Hungarian football player who currently plays for Ceglédi VSE.

== Career statistics ==
Appearances and goals by club, season and competition
| Club | Season | League | | | Cup | | League Cup | | Europe | | Total | |
| Club | Season | Division | Apps | Goals | Apps | Goals | Apps | Goals | Apps | Goals | Apps | Goals |
|---|---|---|---|---|---|---|---|---|---|---|---|---|
| Honvéd | 2013–14 | Nemzeti Bajnokság I | 0 | 0 | 1 | 0 | 1 | 0 | 0 | 0 | 2 | 0 |
| Kecskemét | 2014–15 | Nemzeti Bajnokság I | 3 | 0 | 0 | 0 | 3 | 0 | 0 | 0 | 6 | 0 |
| Career total | | | 3 | 0 | 1 | 0 | 4 | 0 | 0 | 0 | 8 | 0 |

Updated to games played as of 15 October 2014.
