= Ádám Présinger =

Hungarian footballer

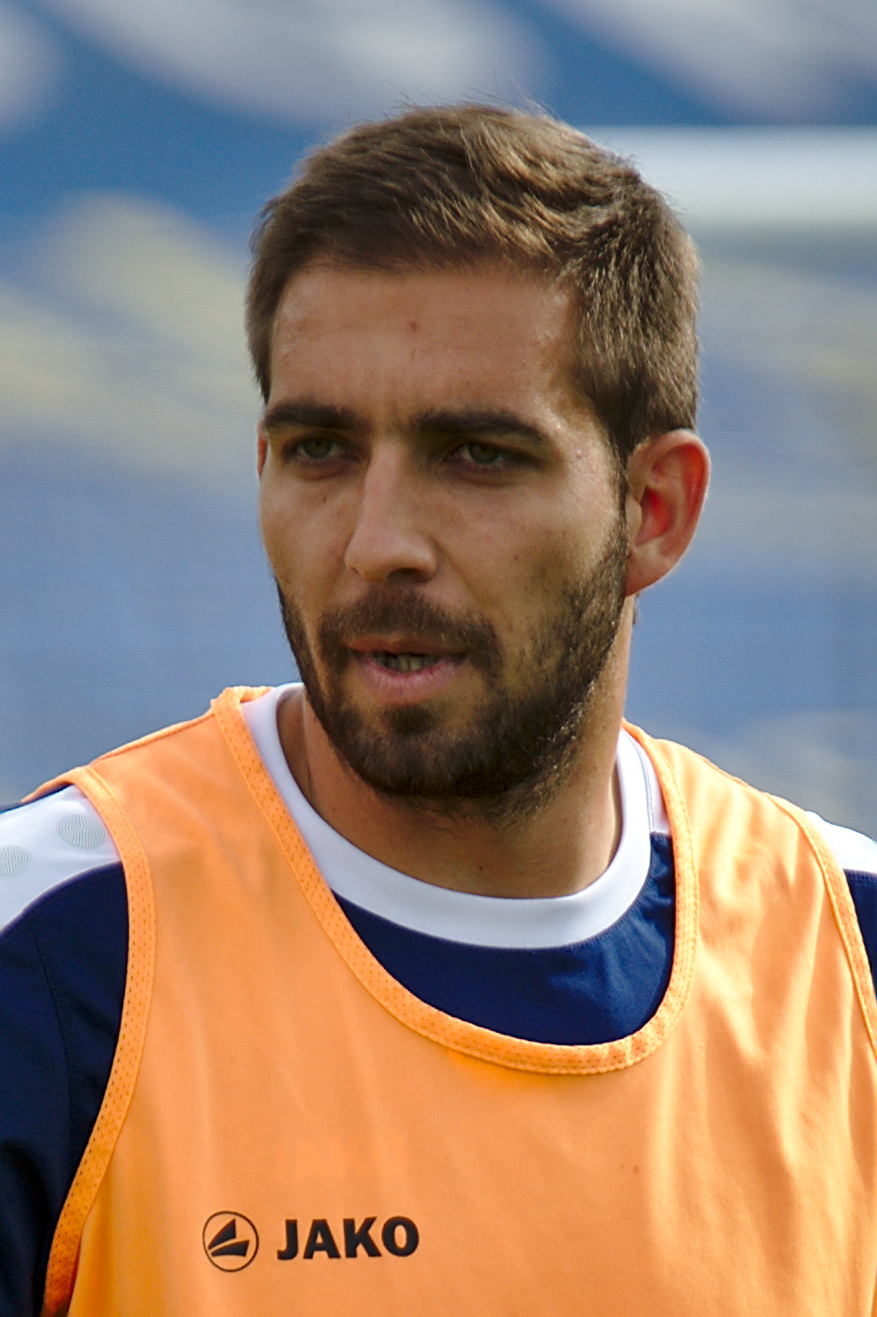

Personal information
- Full name: Ádám Présinger
- Date of birth: 26 January 1989 (age 37)
- Place of birth: Pápa, Hungary
- Height: 1.86 m (6 ft 1 in)
- Position: Left back

Team information
- Current team: Ajka
- Number: 11

Youth career
- 2001–2003: Győr
- 2003–2007: MTK

Senior career*
Years	Team	Apps	(Gls)
2007–2009	MTK	0	(0)
2007–2008	→ Integrál-DAC (loan)	22	(2)
2009	→ Pécs (loan)	11	(1)
2009–2011	Videoton	2	(1)
2011	→ Vasas (loan)	6	(0)
2011–2014	Pápa	64	(2)
2014–2020	Gyirmót	128	(5)
2020–	Ajka	81	(1)

International career
2005–2006	Hungary U-17	8	(0)
2007–2008	Hungary U-19	7	(1)
2008–2010	Hungary U-20	11	(1)
2009–2010	Hungary U-21	3	(1)
- * Club domestic league appearances and goals as of 20 December 2023

Ádám Présinger (born 26 January 1989) is a Hungarian football player who plays for Ajka.

== Honours ==
- FIFA U-20 World Cup:
  - Third place: 2009
