= Sándor Nagy (footballer, born 1988) =

Hungarian footballer

Personal information
- Date of birth: 1 January 1988 (age 38)
- Place of birth: Szolnok, Hungary
- Height: 1.78 m (5 ft 10 in)
- Position: Right back

Youth career
- 2005–2007: Ferencváros

Senior career*
Years	Team	Apps	(Gls)
2007–2008	Ferencváros	22	(1)
2008–2009	Kecskemét	2	(0)
2009–2014	Pápa	90	(0)
2014–2017	Gyirmót	53	(0)
2017	Cegléd	16	(0)
2017–2022	Békéscsaba	127	(5)
- * Club domestic league appearances and goals as of 5 December 2021

Sándor Nagy (born 1 January 1988) is a Hungarian former football player. He has a twin brother named József Nagy, who also is a footballer.
