= Viktor Tölgyesi =

Hungarian footballer

Personal information
- Date of birth: 18 January 1992 (age 34)
- Place of birth: Kecskemét, Hungary
- Height: 1.86 m (6 ft 1 in)
- Position: Midfielder

Team information
- Current team: Martfű

Youth career
- 2002–2006: Kecskemét
- 2006–2007: Ferencváros

Senior career*
Years	Team	Apps	(Gls)
2007–2014	Kecskemét	17	(0)
2013	→ Gyirmót (loan)	15	(0)
2013–2014	→ Békéscsaba (loan)	27	(1)
2014–2015	Békéscsaba	10	(0)
2015–2016	Felsőtárkány	13	(0)
2016	Kecskemét	0	(0)
2016–2017	Ajka	32	(2)
2017–2020	Tiszakécske	90	(7)
2020–2022	Pécs	29	(0)
2022	Dunaújváros	18	(0)
2022–2023	Kozármisleny	32	(1)
2023–	Martfű	2	(0)

International career^{‡}
2012	Hungary U-20	2	(0)
2012–2013	Hungary U-21	2	(0)
- * Club domestic league appearances and goals as of 13 August 2023 ‡ National team caps and goals as of 15 October 2012

Viktor Tölgyesi (born 18 January 1992) is a Hungarian football player who plays for Martfű in the Nemzeti Bajnokság III.

== Club career ==
On 28 July 2022, Tölgyesi signed with Kozármisleny.
