= Adrián Szekeres =

Hungarian footballer

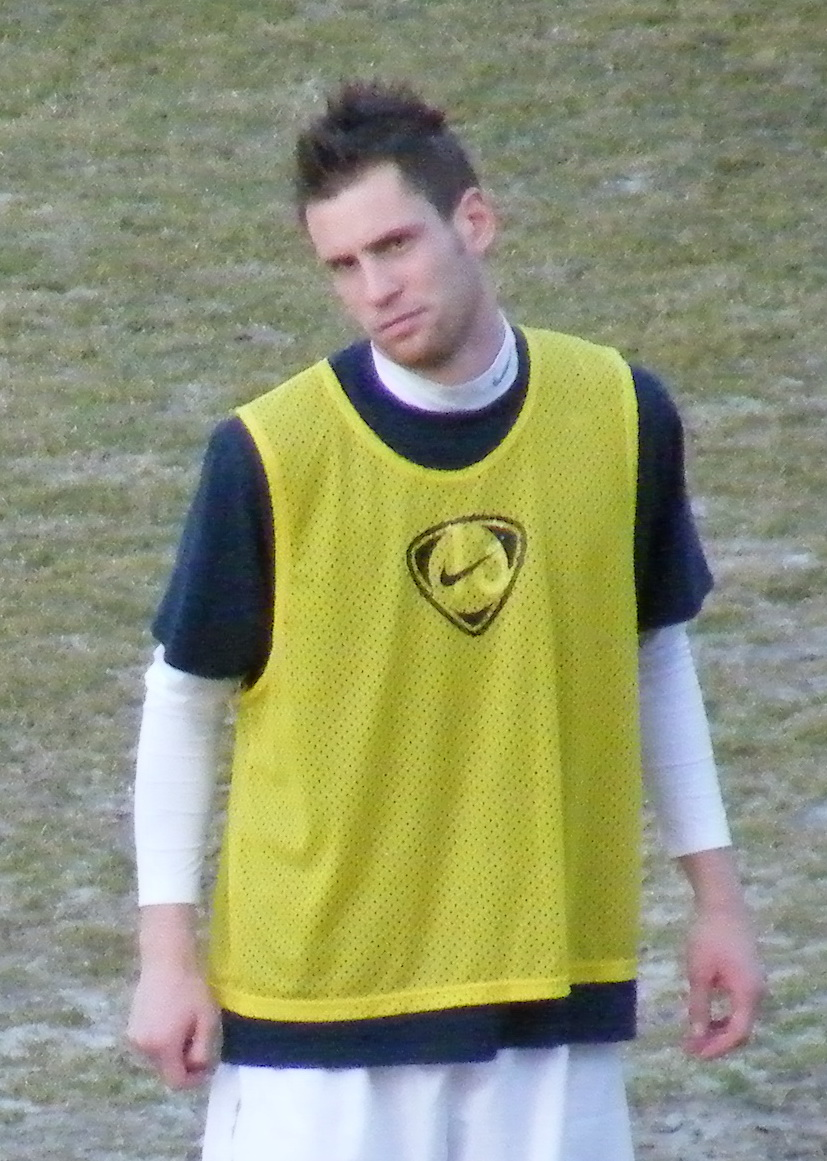

Personal information
- Full name: Adrián Szekeres
- Date of birth: 21 April 1989 (age 37)
- Place of birth: Budapest, Hungary
- Height: 1.91 m (6 ft 3 in)
- Position: Right-back

Youth career
- 2003–2004: Újpest
- 2004–2007: MTK

Senior career*
Years	Team	Apps	(Gls)
2007–2012	MTK	94	(1)
2012–2016	Videoton	10	(2)
2013–2014	→ Puskás (loan)	21	(1)
2014–2015	→ Dunaújváros (loan)	18	(0)
2016–2017	Gyirmót	12	(1)

International career
2006–2007	Hungary U-17	6	(0)
2007–2008	Hungary U-19	8	(0)
2008–2010	Hungary U-20	11	(2)
2010	Hungary U-21	1	(0)
- * Club domestic league appearances and goals as of 12 March 2017 (UTC)

Adrián Szekeres (born 21 April 1989 in Budapest) is a Hungarian former professional football played as a right-back.

== Career statistics ==
As of 7 February 2022

Appearances and goals by club, season and competition
Club	Season	League			National cup		League cup		Europe		Total	
Club	Season	Division	Apps	Goals	Apps	Goals	Apps	Goals	Apps	Goals	Apps	Goals
MTK Budapest	2007–08	Nemzeti Bajnokság I	5	0	0	0	3	0	0	0	8	0
MTK Budapest	2008–09	Nemzeti Bajnokság I	14	1	4	0	3	1	0	0	21	2
MTK Budapest	2009–10	Nemzeti Bajnokság I	18	0	2	0	0	0	–		20	0
MTK Budapest	2010–11	Nemzeti Bajnokság I	29	0	6	1	1	0	–		36	1
MTK Budapest	2011–12	Nemzeti Bajnokság II	28	0	10	0	6	0	–		44	0
MTK Budapest	Total		94	1	22	1	13	1	0	0	129	3
Videoton	2012–13	Nemzeti Bajnokság I	10	2	1	0	4	0	1	0	17	2
Videoton	2013–14	Nemzeti Bajnokság I	0	0	0	0	0	0	1	0	1	0
Videoton	2015–16	Nemzeti Bajnokság I	0	0	1	0	0	0	0	0	1	0
Videoton	Total		10	2	2	0	4	0	2	0	19	2
Puskás	2013–14	Nemzeti Bajnokság I	21	1	3	0	4	0	–		28	1
Dunaújváros	2014–15	Nemzeti Bajnokság I	18	0	1	0	0	0	–		19	0
Gyirmót	2015–16	Nemzeti Bajnokság II	11	1	0	0	–		–		11	1
Gyirmót	2016–17	Nemzeti Bajnokság I	1	0	0	0	–		–		1	0
Gyirmót	Total		12	1	0	0	0	0	0	0	12	1
Career total			155	5	28	1	21	1	2	0	207	7

== Honours ==
- FIFA U-20 World Cup:
  - Third place: 2009
