= János Máté =

Hungarian footballer

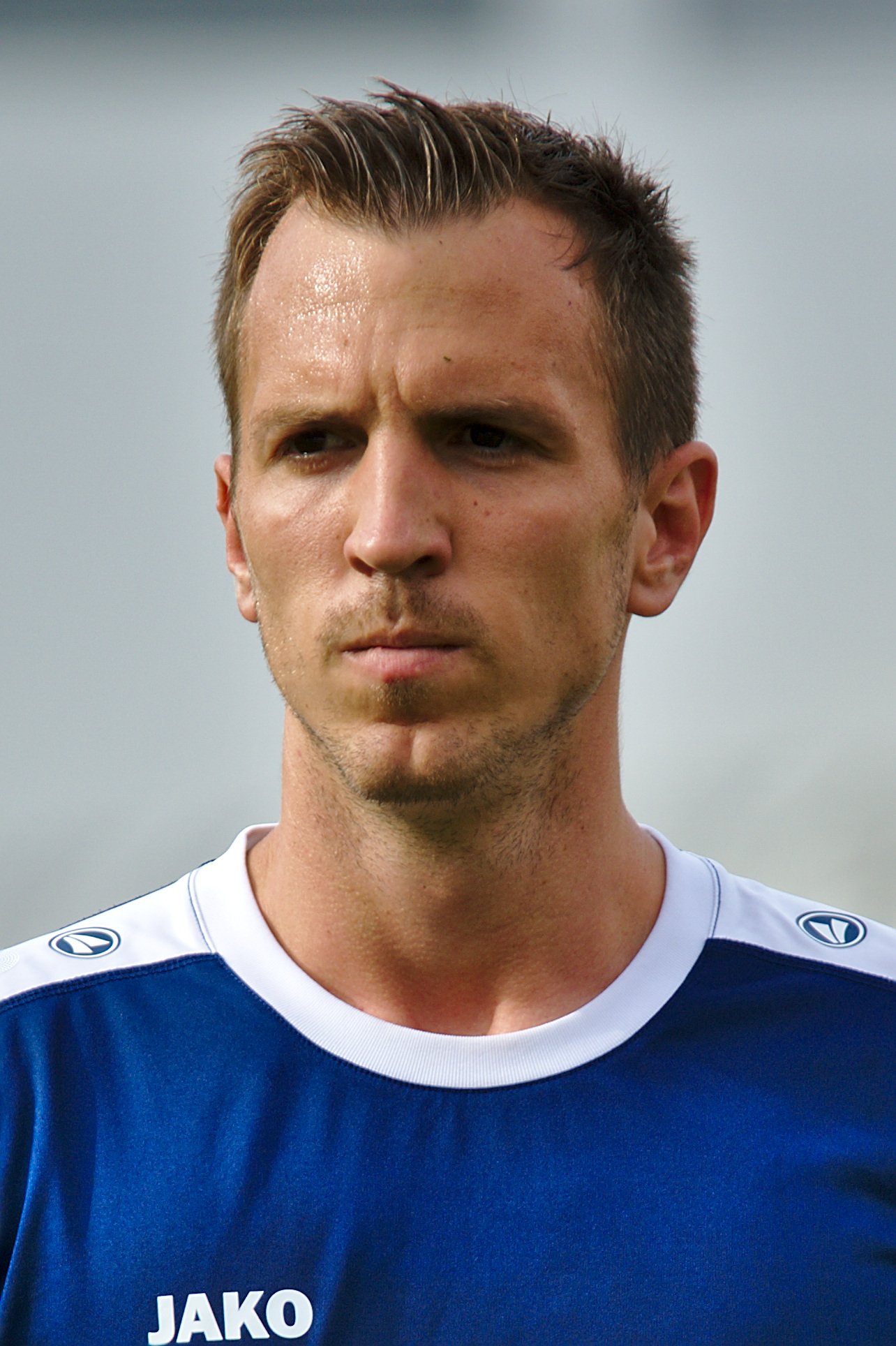

Personal information
- Full name: János Máté
- Date of birth: 19 May 1990 (age 36)
- Place of birth: Debrecen, Hungary
- Height: 1.91 m (6 ft 3 in)
- Position: Striker

Team information
- Current team: Tiszakécske
- Number: 10

Youth career
- 1999–2008: Debrecen

Senior career*
Years	Team	Apps	(Gls)
2008–2012	Videoton	1	(0)
2012–2013	Ferencváros	8	(1)
2013	→ Siófok (loan)	10	(2)
2013–2014	Szolnok	16	(3)
2014	→ Nyíregyháza	3	(0)
2014–2016	Mezőkövesd	33	(22)
2016–2017	Gyirmót	19	(6)
2017	→ Balmazújváros (loan)	4	(0)
2017–2018	Csákvár	12	(0)
2018–2019	Szeged-Csanád	20	(15)
2019–2020	Pécs	8	(7)
2020–	Tiszakécske	19	(13)
- * Club domestic league appearances and goals

János Máté (born 19 May 1990) is a Hungarian football player. He plays for Tiszakécske FC. He played his first league match in 2009.
