= Henri Eninful =

Togolese footballer

Personal information
- Full name: Akoete Henritse Eninful
- Date of birth: 21 July 1992 (age 34)
- Place of birth: Notsé, Togo
- Height: 1.81 m (5 ft 11 1/2 in)
- Position: Midfielder

Youth career
- 2010–2011: Standard Liège

Senior career*
Years	Team	Apps	(Gls)
2011–2013	Standard Liège	3	(0)
2012	→ Újpest (loan)	11	(0)
2013–2014	Újpest	6	(0)
2014	→ Kecskemét (loan)	12	(1)
2014–2015	Kecskemét	20	(0)
2015–2018	Doxa	86	(5)
2019	FCB Sprimont	0	(0)
2020–2021	FC Lahti	38	(1)

International career^{‡}
2015–	Togo	9	(0)
- * Club domestic league appearances and goals as of 27 October 2021 ‡ National team caps and goals as of 15 November 2016

Akoete Henritse 'Henri' Eninful (born 21 July 1992) is a Togolese professional footballer who plays as a midfielder and has played for the Togo national football team.

== Career ==
=== FC Lahti ===
On 22 January 2020 Finnish club FC Lahti confirmed the signing of Eninful on a one-year contract with an option for one further year.

== Career statistics ==
=== International ===
Appearances and goals by national team and year
National team	Year	Apps	Goals
Togo	2015	1	0
Togo	2016	8	0
Togo	2017	–	
Togo	2018	–	
Togo	2019	–	
Togo	2020	–	
Togo	2021	5	1
Total		14	1

Scores and results list Togo's goal tally first, score column indicates score after each Eninful goal.

List of international goals scored by Henri Eninful
No.	Date	Venue	Opponent	Score	Result	Competition
1	29 March 2021	Stade de Kégué, Lomé, Togo	Kenya	1–2	1–2	2021 Africa Cup of Nations qualification
