= Bara Bebeto =

Senegalese football player

Personal information
- Full name: Bara Mamadou Lamine Ndiaye
- Date of birth: 31 December 1991 (age 34)
- Place of birth: Tivaouane, Senegal
- Height: 1.86 m (6 ft 1 in)
- Position: Striker

Team information
- Current team: Ceyhanspor

Youth career
- 2008–2009: Teramo

Senior career*
Years	Team	Apps	(Gls)
2009–2010	Teramo	17	(1)
2010–2011	Giulianova	15	(0)
2011–2014	Lugano	28	(2)
2012	→ Kaposvár (loan)	9	(5)
2014	→ Kecskemét (loan)	10	(2)
2014–2015	Kecskemét	28	(9)
2015–2016	Gaziantep BB	4	(1)
2016–2017	Doxa Katokopia	16	(1)
2017	Gyirmót	6	(0)
2017–	Ceyhanspor	?	(?)
- * Club domestic league appearances and goals as of 5 March 2017 (UTC)

Bara Mamadou Lamine Ndiaye (born 31 December 1991, in Tivaouane) often referred to as Bara Bebeto or just Bebeto, is a Senegalese football player who plays for Turkish club Ceyhanspor.

== Career ==
The former street vendor started his football career in 2008 in Italy with Teramo Calcio, debuted as a senior during the 2009–2010 season of the Eccellenza.

Following six months with the senior side of Teramo Calcio, he left in February 2010 and joined to Serie C1 club Giulianova Calcio.

=== FC Lugano ===
In September 2011, he signed for Swiss Challenge League team FC Lugano and played his debut on 23 October 2011 against FC Wil 1900.

=== Kaposvári Rákóczi FC ===
On 20 February 2012 he loaned out to the Kaposvári Rákóczi FC and played his debut on 3 March 2012 against Videoton FC. N'diaye scored his first goal in the Nemzeti Bajnokság I on 24 March 2012 in his third match for Kaposvári Rákóczi FC against BFC Siófok.
