= Győri ETO FC II =

Hungarian football club

- Full name: Győri Egyetértés Torna Osztály Football Club II
- Founded: 1904
- Ground: Stadion ETO, Győr
- Capacity: 20'000 Under construction
- Chairman: Tibor Klement
- Manager: István Klement
- League: NB II
- 2008–09: 13th
Home colours	Away colours

Győri ETO FC II is the second team of Győri ETO FC and this year they play in the Western group of the Hungarian National Championship II.
