= 2013–14 Kaposvári Rákóczi FC season =

Kaposvári Rákóczi FC
2013–14 season
- Chairman: Ferenc Illés
- Manager: László Prukner (until 3 January 2014); Tibor Selymes
- NB 1: 16th (relegated)
- Hungarian Cup: Round of 16
- Hungarian League Cup: Round of 16
- Top goalscorer: League: Tarmo Kink (4); All: Róbert Waltner (7)
- Highest home attendance: 3,000 vs Ferencváros (20 October 2013)
- Lowest home attendance: 100 vs Zalaegerszeg (13 November 2013)
Home colours	Away colours

The 2013–14 season will be Kaposvári Rákóczi FC's 15th competitive season, 10th consecutive season in the OTP Bank Liga and 90th year in existence as a football club.

== First team squad ==
Note: Flags indicate national team as defined under FIFA eligibility rules; some limited exceptions apply. Players may hold more than one non-FIFA nationality.

No.	Pos.	Nation	Player
1	MF	HUN	Edvárd Rusák
3	MF	GHA	Aaron Dankwah
4	MF	HUN	Lukács Bőle
5	DF	HUN	István Bank
6	MF	FRA	Issaga Diallo
7	MF	ROU	Andrei Florean
8	DF	COD	Landry Mulemo
9	FW	EST	Tarmo Kink
10	MF	ROU	Dragoș Firțulescu
13	DF	SRB	Dražen Okuka
15	MF	HUN	Olivér Kovács
17	DF	FRA	Badis Lebbihi
18	MF	HUN	Benjamin Balázs

No.	Pos.	Nation	Player
19	MF	HUN	Ádám Albert
23	DF	BEL	Pieter Mbemba
24	MF	ROU	Andrei Coroian
25	MF	SEN	Khaly Thiam
26	MF	HUN	Patrik Böjte
27	FW	GAM	Jammeh Haruna
29	FW	HUN	Márk Murai
31	MF	CRO	Luka Dominić
32	MF	HUN	Valentin Hadaró
33	DF	HUN	Milán Földes
87	GK	SVN	Safet Jahič
99	GK	HUN	Botond Antal

== Transfers ==
=== Summer ===
In: Note: Flags indicate national team as defined under FIFA eligibility rules; some limited exceptions apply. Players may hold more than one non-FIFA nationality.

No.	Pos.	Nation	Player
6	DF	ROU	Iulian Petrache (from (Romania) Bihor Oradea)
8	MF	CRO	Stjepan Babić (from (Croatia) Rudeš)
11	FW	ROU	Adrian Mărkuş (from (Romania) Bihor Oradea)
16	DF	BRA	Lucas (from Vasas)
19	MF	HUN	Ádám Albert (from Eger)
20	DF	HUN	Bence Zámbó (from Győr)
24	MF	ROU	Andrei Coroian (from (Romania) Bihor Oradea)
26	DF	HUN	Patrik Böjte (from Kaposvár II)
31	MF	CRO	Luka Dominić (from (Croatia) Prelog)
33	DF	HUN	Milán Földes (from Kaposvár II)
70	GK	SVN	Marko Ranilović (from Ferencváros)

Out: Note: Flags indicate national team as defined under FIFA eligibility rules; some limited exceptions apply. Players may hold more than one non-FIFA nationality.

No.	Pos.	Nation	Player
8	MF	CRO	Nikola Šafarić (to (Slovenia) Zavrč)
16	FW	GUI	Moustapha Diallo
20	DF	HUN	Bence Zámbó (loan return to Győr)
21	GK	SVK	Ľuboš Hajdúch (to Puskás)
29	DF	GRE	Lazaros Fotias (loan return to (Italy) Parma)
24	MF	HUN	Dávid Hegedűs (to Mezőkövesd)
33	MF	BRA	Pedro (to (Greece) Levadiakos)

=== Winter ===
In: Note: Flags indicate national team as defined under FIFA eligibility rules; some limited exceptions apply. Players may hold more than one non-FIFA nationality.

No.	Pos.	Nation	Player
6	DF	FRA	Issaga Diallo (from (Switzerland) Servette)
7	MF	ROU	Andrei Florean (from (Romania) Bihor Oradea)
8	DF	COD	Landry Mulemo (from (Israel) Beitar Jerusalem)
9	FW	EST	Tarmo Kink (from (Italy) Varese)
10	MF	ROU	Dragoș Firțulescu (from (Romania) UTA Arad)
11	MF	CMR	Armand Ella (loan from (Ukraine) Karpaty Lviv)
17	DF	FRA	Badis Lebbihi (from (France) Épinal)
23	DF	BEL	Pieter Mbemba (from (Cyprus) Omonia)
87	GK	SVN	Safet Jahič (from Zalaegerszeg)
99	GK	HUN	Botond Antal (from Kecskemét)

Out: Note: Flags indicate national team as defined under FIFA eligibility rules; some limited exceptions apply. Players may hold more than one non-FIFA nationality.

No.	Pos.	Nation	Player
2	DF	HUN	Ádám Major (to Nagyatád)
6	DF	ROU	Iulian Petrache
7	MF	SRB	Bojan Pavlović (to (Croatia) Istra)
8	MF	CRO	Stjepan Babić (to (Lithuania) Šiauliai)
9	FW	HUN	Róbert Waltner (to Siófok)
11	FW	ROU	Adrian Mărkuş (to Gaz Metan)
14	FW	HUN	Lóránt Oláh (to Kozármisleny)
16	DF	BRA	Lucas
17	FW	CRO	Bojan Vručina
20	DF	HUN	Bence Zámbó (to Tatabánya)
28	DF	HUN	Gábor Jánvári (to Nyíregyháza)
30	GK	HUN	Zsolt Posza (to Balatonlelle)
70	GK	SVN	Marko Ranilović

- List of Hungarian football transfers summer 2013
- List of Hungarian football transfers winter 2013–14

== Statistics ==
=== Appearances and goals ===
Last updated on 1 June 2014.

No.	Pos	Nat	Player	Total		OTP Bank Liga		Hungarian Cup		League Cup	
No.	Pos	Nat	Player	Apps	Goals	Apps	Goals	Apps	Goals	Apps	Goals
1	GK	(Hungary) HUN	Edvárd Rusák	7	-15	3	-9	2	-4	2	-2
3	MF	(Ghana) GHA	Aaron Dankwah	23	0	16	0	2	0	5	0
4	MF	(Hungary) HUN	Lukács Bőle	29	0	24	0	0	0	5	0
5	DF	(Hungary) HUN	István Bank	5	0	5	0	0	0	0	0
6	DF	(France) FRA	Issaga Diallo	14	0	12	0	0	0	2	0
7	MF	(Romania) ROU	Andrei Florean	13	0	13	0	0	0	0	0
8	DF	(Democratic Republic of the Congo) COD	Landry Mulemo	11	0	11	0	0	0	0	0
9	FW	(Estonia) EST	Tarmo Kink	12	4	12	4	0	0	0	0
10	MF	(Romania) ROU	Dragoș Firțulescu	14	0	13	0	0	0	1	0
13	DF	(Serbia) SRB	Dražen Okuka	29	0	23	0	2	0	4	0
15	MF	(Hungary) HUN	Olivér Kovács	24	0	20	0	1	0	3	0
17	DF	(France) FRA	Badis Lebbihi	10	0	10	0	0	0	0	0
18	MF	(Hungary) HUN	Benjamin Balázs	33	4	30	2	1	1	2	1
19	MF	(Hungary) HUN	Ádám Albert	11	0	3	0	2	0	6	0
23	DF	(Belgium) BEL	Pieter Mbemba	10	0	9	0	0	0	1	0
24	MF	(Romania) ROU	Andrei Coroian	22	1	16	1	2	0	4	0
25	MF	(Senegal) SEN	Khaly Thiam	25	4	19	3	2	1	4	0
26	MF	(Hungary) HUN	Patrik Böjte	13	0	5	0	3	0	5	0
27	FW	(The Gambia) GAM	Jammeh Haruna	18	2	11	0	2	1	5	1
29	FW	(Hungary) HUN	Márk Murai	18	2	12	0	1	0	5	2
31	MF	(Croatia) CRO	Luka Dominić	12	4	4	0	3	0	5	4
32	MF	(Hungary) HUN	Valentin Hadaró	5	0	3	0	0	0	2	0
33	DF	(Hungary) HUN	Milán Földes	12	0	5	0	1	0	6	0
87	GK	(Slovenia) SVN	Safet Jahič	3	-3	2	-2	0	0	1	-1
99	GK	(Hungary) HUN	Botond Antal	9	-9	8	-6	0	0	1	-3
Youth players:
11	MF	(Cameroon) CMR	Armand Ella	2	0	0	0	0	0	2	0
22	MF	(Hungary) HUN	Gergely Horváth	2	0	0	0	0	0	2	0
32	FW	(Hungary) HUN	Árpád Horváth	1	1	0	0	0	0	1	1
Players no longer at the club:
6	DF	(Romania) ROU	Iulian Petrache	18	4	11	2	3	0	4	2
7	MF	(Serbia) SRB	Bojan Pavlović	17	1	10	0	3	1	4	0
8	MF	(Croatia) CRO	Stjepan Babić	21	1	15	1	1	0	5	0
9	FW	(Hungary) HUN	Róbert Waltner	17	7	15	3	1	3	1	1
11	FW	(Romania) ROU	Adrian Mărkuş	15	5	13	3	1	0	1	2
14	FW	(Hungary) HUN	Lóránt Oláh	18	1	13	0	2	1	3	0
16	DF	(Brazil) BRA	Lucas	12	3	6	1	1	0	5	2
17	FW	(Croatia) CRO	Bojan Vručina	13	4	7	1	2	0	4	3
20	DF	(Hungary) HUN	Bence Zámbó	15	0	12	0	1	0	2	0
28	DF	(Hungary) HUN	Gábor Jánvári	14	0	8	0	2	0	4	0
30	GK	(Hungary) HUN	Zsolt Posza	9	-15	6	-14	1	0	2	-1
70	GK	(Slovenia) SVN	Marko Ranilović	13	-24	11	-23	0	0	2	-1

=== Top scorers ===
Includes all competitive matches. The list is sorted by shirt number when total goals are equal.

Last updated on 1 June 2014

Position	Nation	Number	Name	OTP Bank Liga	Hungarian Cup	League Cup	Total
1	(Hungary)	9	Róbert Waltner	3	3	1	7
2	(Romania)	11	Adrian Mărkuş	3	0	2	5
3	(Estonia)	9	Tarmo Kink	4	0	0	4
4	(Senegal)	25	Khaly Thiam	3	1	0	4
5	(Hungary)	18	Benjamin Balázs	2	1	1	4
6	(Romania)	6	Iulian Petrache	2	0	2	4
7	(Croatia)	17	Bojan Vručina	1	0	3	4
8	(Croatia)	31	Luka Dominić	0	0	4	4
9	(Brazil)	16	Lucas	1	0	2	3
10	(The Gambia)	27	Jammeh Haruna	0	1	1	2
11	(Hungary)	29	Márk Murai	0	0	2	2
12	(Croatia)	8	Stjepan Babić	1	0	0	1
13	(Romania)	24	Coroian	1	0	0	1
14	(Hungary)	14	Lóránt Oláh	0	1	0	1
15	(Serbia)	7	Bojan Pavlović	0	1	0	1
16	(Hungary)	32	Árpád Horváth	0	0	1	1
/	/	/	Own Goals	0	0	1	1
			TOTALS	21	8	20	49

=== Disciplinary record ===
Includes all competitive matches. Players with 1 card or more included only.

Last updated on 1 June 2014

Position	Nation	Number	Name	OTP Bank Liga		Hungarian Cup		League Cup		Total (Hu Total)	
Position	Nation	Number	Name	Booked	Sent off (straight red)	Booked	Sent off (straight red)	Booked	Sent off (straight red)	Booked	Sent off (straight red)
MF	(Ghana)	3	Aaron Dankwah	6	0	1	0	1	0	8 (6)	0 (0)
MF	(Hungary)	4	Lukács Bőle	5	0	0	0	1	0	6 (5)	0 (0)
DF	(Hungary)	5	István Bank	0	1	0	0	0	0	0 (0)	1 (1)
DF	(Romania)	6	Iulian Petrache	3	0	1	0	1	0	5 (3)	0 (0)
DF	(France)	6	Issaga Diallo	3	0	0	0	0	0	3 (3)	0 (0)
MF	(Romania)	7	Andrei Florean	3	0	0	0	0	0	3 (3)	0 (0)
DF	(Democratic Republic of the Congo)	8	Landry Mulemo	5	0	0	0	0	0	5 (5)	0 (0)
MF	(Croatia)	8	Stjepan Babić	6	0	1	0	0	0	7 (6)	0 (0)
MF	(Hungary)	8	Gergely Horváth	0	0	0	0	1	0	1 (0)	0 (0)
FW	(Hungary)	9	Róbert Waltner	2	1	0	0	0	0	2 (2)	1 (1)
FW	(Estonia)	9	Tarmo Kink	4	0	0	0	0	0	4 (4)	0 (0)
MF	(Romania)	10	Dragoș Firțulescu	4	0	0	0	1	0	5 (4)	0 (0)
FW	(Romania)	11	Adrian Mărkuş	1	0	0	0	0	0	1 (1)	0 (0)
MF	(Cameroon)	11	Armand Ella	0	0	0	0	1	0	1 (0)	0 (0)
DF	(Serbia)	13	Dražen Okuka	11	0	1	0	0	0	12 (11)	0 (0)
FW	(Hungary)	14	Lóránt Oláh	1	0	0	0	2	0	3 (1)	0 (0)
MF	(Hungary)	15	Olivér Kovács	6	1	0	0	0	0	6 (6)	1 (1)
DF	(Brazil)	16	Lucas	1	0	0	0	1	0	2 (1)	0 (0)
DF	(France)	17	Badis Lebbihi	4	0	0	0	0	0	4 (4)	0 (0)
FW	(Croatia)	17	Bojan Vručina	1	0	1	0	0	0	2 (1)	0 (0)
MF	(Hungary)	18	Benjamin Balázs	4	0	0	0	0	0	4 (4)	0 (0)
MF	(Hungary)	19	Ádám Albert	0	0	1	0	0	0	1 (0)	0 (0)
DF	(Hungary)	20	Bence Zámbó	4	0	0	0	0	0	4 (4)	0 (0)
DF	(Belgium)	23	Pieter Mbemba	1	2	0	0	0	0	1 (1)	2 (2)
MF	(Romania)	24	Andrei Coroian	5	0	0	0	0	0	5 (5)	0 (0)
MF	(Senegal)	25	Khaly Thiam	3	0	0	0	0	0	3 (3)	0 (0)
MF	(Hungary)	26	Patrik Böjte	1	0	0	0	2	0	3 (1)	0 (0)
DF	(Hungary)	28	Gábor Jánvári	2	0	0	0	1	0	3 (2)	0 (0)
FW	(Hungary)	29	Márk Murai	4	0	0	0	0	0	4 (4)	0 (0)
GK	(Hungary)	30	Zsolt Posza	1	0	0	0	0	0	1 (1)	0 (0)
MF	(Hungary)	32	Valentin Hadaró	2	0	0	0	1	0	3 (2)	0 (0)
DF	(Hungary)	33	Milán Földes	4	0	0	0	1	0	5 (4)	0 (0)
GK	(Slovenia)	70	Marko Ranilović	0	1	0	0	0	0	0 (0)	1 (1)
			TOTALS	96	6	6	0	15	0	117 (96)	6 (6)

=== Overall ===
Games played	41 (30 OTP Bank Liga, 3 Hungarian Cup and 8 Hungarian League Cup)
Games won	10 (4 OTP Bank Liga, 1 Hungarian Cup and 5 Hungarian League Cup)
Games drawn	8 (7 OTP Bank Liga, 0 Hungarian Cup and 1 Hungarian League Cup)
Games lost	23 (19 OTP Bank Liga, 2 Hungarian Cup and 2 Hungarian League Cup)
Goals scored	49
Goals conceded	66
Goal difference	-17
Yellow cards	117
Red cards	6
Worst discipline	(Serbia) Dražen Okuka (12 (yellow card) , 0 (red card) )
Best result	6–0 (A) v Ajka - Magyar Kupa - 29-10-2013
Best result	7–1 (A) v Siófok - Ligakupa - 20-11-2013
Worst result	1–7 (A) v Debrecen - OTP Bank Liga - 28-07-2013
Most appearances	(Hungary) Benjamin Balázs (33 appearances)
Top scorer	(Hungary) Róbert Waltner (7 goals)
Points	38/123 (30.89%)

Last updated: 1 June 2014

== Nemzeti Bajnokság I ==
=== Matches ===
28 July 2013 1	Debrecen	7 – 1	Kaposvár	Debrecen, Hajdú-Bihar County
20:30 CEST	Sidibe 13' (pen.); Korhut 38'; Kulcsár 50', 53'; Ferenczi 70'; Horváth 78'; Zsidai 87'	(Report)	Vručina 8'	Stadium: Stadion Oláh Gábor Út; Attendance: 2,500; Referee: (Hungary) Ádám Farkas

3 August 2013 2	Kaposvár	1 – 2	Kecskemét	Kaposvár, Somogy County
19:00 CEST	Petrache 21'	(Report)	Mogyorósi 6'; Forró 33'	Stadium: Stadion Kaposvár Rákóczi; Attendance: 2,000; Referee: (Hungary) József Erdős

10 August 2013 3	Pápa	1 – 0	Kaposvár	Pápa, Veszprém County
19:00 CEST	Dankwah 1' (o.g.)	(Report)		Stadium: Stadion Várkerti; Attendance: 1,000; Referee: (Hungary) Dániel Becséri

16 August 2013 4	Kaposvár	2 – 2	Újpest	Kaposvár, Somogy County
19:00 CEST	Petrache 68'; Thiam 81'	(Report)	Vasiljević 44' (pen.); Lázár 87'	Stadium: Stadion Kaposvár Rákóczi; Attendance: 2,500; Referee: (Hungary) Zsolt Szabó

24 August 2013 5	Puskás	1 – 0	Kaposvár	Székesfehérvár, Fejér County
19:00 CEST	Tischler 90'	(Report)		Stadium: Sóstói Stadion; Attendance: 500; Referee: (Hungary) Tamás Bognár

1 September 2013 6	Kaposvár	0 – 4	Honvéd	Kaposvár, Somogy County
18:30 CEST		(Report)	Vécsei 4'; Vernes 48' (pen.); Holender 61'; Lovrić 65'	Stadium: Stadion Kaposvár Rákóczi; Attendance: 2,000; Referee: (Hungary) Péter Solymosi

13 September 2013 7	Paks	2 – 0	Kaposvár	Paks, Tolna County
19:00 CEST	Windecker 41'; Simon 78'	(Report)		Stadium: Stadion PSE; Attendance: 1,000; Referee: (Hungary) Ádám Farkas

21 September 2013 8	Mezőkövesd	1 – 3	Kaposvár	Mezőkövesd, Borsod-Abaúj-Zemplén County
18:00 CEST	Harsányi 90+2' (pen.)	(Report)	Thiam 2'; Mărkuş 4'; Balázs 59'	Stadium: Mezőkövesdi Városi Stadion; Attendance: 2,900; Referee: (Hungary) Dániel Becséri

28 September 2013 9	Kaposvár	0 – 2	Diósgyőr	Kaposvár, Somogy County
16:00 CEST		(Report)	Nikházi 3', 70'	Stadium: Stadion Kaposvár Rákóczi; Attendance: 1,400; Referee: (Hungary) Zsolt Szabó

5 October 2013 10	Haladás	4 – 1	Kaposvár	Szombathely, Vas County
20:00 CEST	Halmosi 5'; Radó 50' 80' (pen.); Fehér 82'	(Report)	Lucas 39'	Stadium: Rohonci Street Stadium; Attendance: 1,780; Referee: (Hungary) Ádám Németh

20 October 2013 11	Kaposvár	1 – 1	Ferencváros	Kaposvár, Somogy County
18:30 CEST	Mărkuş 57'	(Report)	Böde 89'	Stadium: Stadion Kaposvár Rákóczi; Attendance: 3,000; Referee: (Hungary) József Erdős

26 October 2013 12	Pécs	3 – 1	Kaposvár	Pécs, Baranya County
16:00 CEST	Szatmári 50'; Koller 66', 80'	(Report)	Waltner 84'	Stadium: Stadion PMFC; Attendance: 1,000; Referee: (Hungary) István Vad

2 November 2013 13	Kaposvár	1 – 0	Videoton	Kaposvár, Somogy County
16:00 CET	Waltner 69' (pen.)	(Report)		Stadium: Stadion Kaposvár Rákóczi; Attendance: 1,500; Referee: (Hungary) Ádám Németh

9 November 2013 14	Győr	1 – 0	Kaposvár	Győr, Győr-Moson-Sopron County
16:00 CET	Lipták 65'	(Report)		Stadium: ETO Park; Attendance: 1,500; Referee: (Hungary) Dániel Becséri

23 November 2013 15	Kaposvár	2 – 2	MTK	Kaposvár, Somogy County
16:00 CET	Babić 58'; Mărkuş 83'	(Report)	Kanta 5'; Eppel 30'	Stadium: Stadion Kaposvár Rákóczi; Attendance: 1,800; Referee: (Hungary) Sándor Andó-Szabó

30 November 2013 16	Kaposvár	1 – 2	Debrecen	Kaposvár, Somogy County
14:00 CET	Waltner 69'	(Report)	Ludánszki 37'; Bouadla 82'	Stadium: Stadion Kaposvár Rákóczi; Attendance: 1,500; Referee: (Hungary) Tamás Bognár

7 December 2013 17	Kecskemét	2 – 1	Kaposvár	Kecskemét, Bács-Kiskun County
16:00 CET	Kovács 1' (o.g.); Gréczi 21'	(Report)	Thiam 38'	Stadium: Széktói Stadion; Attendance: 831; Referee: (Hungary) Dániel Becséri

1 March 2014 18	Kaposvár	1 – 1	Pápa	Kaposvár, Somogy County
16:00 CET	Balázs 32'	(Report)	Kenesei 84'	Stadium: Stadion Kaposvár Rákóczi; Attendance: 1,500; Referee: (Hungary) Mihály Fábián

8 March 2014 19	Újpest	1 – 1	Kaposvár	Budapest, Pest County
18:00 CET	Lázár 20'	(Report)	Kink 27'	Stadium: Szusza Ferenc Stadium; Attendance: 2,311; Referee: (Hungary) Zoltán Iványi

16 March 2014 20	Kaposvár	1 – 1	Puskás	Kaposvár, Somogy County
16:30 CET	Kink 57'	(Report)	Lencse 32'	Stadium: Stadion Kaposvár Rákóczi; Attendance: 1,500; Referee: (Hungary) Péter Solymosi

22 March 2014 21	Honvéd	1 – 0	Kaposvár	Budapest, Pest County
18:00 CET	Holender 23'	(Report)		Stadium: Bozsik Stadion; Attendance: 1,500; Referee: (Hungary) Ádám Farkas

29 March 2014 22	Kaposvár	0 – 0	Paks	Kaposvár, Somogy County
16:00 CET		(Report)		Stadium: Stadion Kaposvár Rákóczi; Attendance: 1,200; Referee: (Hungary) Mihály Fábián

7 April 2014 23	Kaposvár	1 – 0	Mezőkövesd	Kaposvár, Somogy County
20:45 CEST	Coroian 50'	(Report)		Stadium: Stadion Kaposvár Rákóczi; Attendance: 800; Referee: (Hungary) Zsolt Szabó

12 April 2014 24	Diósgyőr	1 – 0	Kaposvár	Miskolc, Borsod-Abaúj-Zemplén County
18:00 CEST	Elek 57'	(Report)		Stadium: DVTK Stadion; Attendance: 3,905; Referee: (Hungary) Dániel Becséri

19 April 2014 25	Kaposvár	2 – 0	Haladás	Kaposvár, Somogy County
20:00 CEST	Kink 21', 71' (pen.)	(Report)		Stadium: Stadion Kaposvár Rákóczi; Attendance: 1,200; Referee: (Hungary) Péter Solymosi

25 April 2014 26	Ferencváros	1 – 0	Kaposvár	Budapest, Pest County
19:00 CEST	Busai 12'	(Report)		Stadium: Ferenc Puskás Stadium; Attendance: 5,344; Referee: (Hungary) Sándor Andó-Szabó

3 May 2014 27	Kaposvár	0 – 2	Pécs	Kaposvár, Somogy County
14:00 CEST		(Report)	Kővári 61'; Mohl 76' (pen.)	Stadium: Stadion Kaposvár Rákóczi; Attendance: 1,200; Referee: (Hungary) Zoltán Iványi

10 May 2014 28	Videoton	2 – 0	Kaposvár	Székesfehérvár, Fejér County
18:00 CEST	Zé Luís 51'; Nikolić 74'	(Report)		Stadium: Sóstói Stadion; Attendance: 2,466; Referee: (Hungary) Ádám Farkas

17 May 2014 29	Kaposvár	0 – 5	Győr	Kaposvár, Somogy County
20:00 CEST		(Report)	Andrić 3'; Lipták 8'; Rudolf 31', 66'; Trajković 73'	Stadium: Stadion Kaposvár Rákóczi; Attendance: 2,000; Referee: (Hungary) Mihály Fábián

31 May 2014 30	MTK	2 – 0	Kaposvár	Budapest, Pest County
18:00 CEST	Bese 34', 43'	(Report)		Stadium: Hidegkuti Nándor Stadium; Attendance: 2,000; Referee: (Hungary) Csaba Pintér

=== Classification ===
Pos	Team	Pld	W	D	L	GF	GA	GD	Pts	Qualification or relegation
12	Pápa	30	9	6	15	32	50	−18	33	
13	Újpest	30	8	8	14	46	51	−5	32	
14	Puskás Akadémia	30	8	7	15	36	51	−15	31	
15	Mezőkövesd (R)	30	6	6	18	27	52	−25	24	Relegation to Nemzeti Bajnokság II
16	Kaposvár (R)	30	4	7	19	21	54	−33	19	Relegation to Nemzeti Bajnokság II

Source: mlsz.hu (in Hungarian)
Rules for classification: 1st points; 2nd overall wins; 3rd goal difference; 4th head-to-head points; 5th head-to-head goal difference; 6th head-to-head away goals scored; 7th fair-play points; 8th drawing of lots
(R) Relegated

=== Results summary ===
Overall								Home						Away					
Pld	W	D	L	GF	GA	GD	Pts	W	D	L	GF	GA	GD	W	D	L	GF	GA	GD
30	4	7	19	21	54	−33	19	3	6	6	13	24	−11	1	1	13	8	30	−22

Last updated: 1 June 2014.
Source: NB1

=== Results by round ===
Round	1	2	3	4	5	6	7	8	9	10	11	12	13	14	15	16	17	18	19	20	21	22	23	24	25	26	27	28	29	30
Ground	A	H	A	H	A	H	A	A	H	A	H	A	H	A	H	H	A	H	A	H	A	H	H	A	H	A	H	A	H	A
Result	L	L	L	D	L	L	L	W	L	L	D	L	W	L	D	L	L	D	D	D	L	D	W	L	W	L	L	L	L	L
Position	16	16	16	16	16	16	16	16	16	16	16	16	16	16	16	16	16	16	16	16	16	16	16	16	16	16	16	16	16	16

Updated to match(es) played on 1 June 2014. Source: Matches
A = Away; H = Home; W = Win; D = Draw; L = Loss

== Hungarian Cup ==
29 October 2013 Round of 32	Ajka	0 – 6	Kaposvár	Ajka, Veszprém County
12:30 CET		(Report)	Waltner 4', 41', 45'; Balázs 36'; Thiam 55'; Haruna 65'	Stadium: Stadium Sport Street; Attendance: 200; Referee: (Hungary) Balázs Berke

27 November 2013 Round of 16 (1st leg)	Kaposvár	1 – 2	Győr	Kaposvár, Somogy County
17:00 CET	Oláh 71' (pen.)	(Report)	Střeštík 59'; Jánvári 64' (o.g.)	Stadium: Stadion Kaposvár Rákóczi; Attendance: 300; Referee: (Hungary) József Erdős

4 December 2013 Round of 16 (2nd leg)	Győr	2 – 1 (4 – 2 agg.)	Kaposvár	Győr, Győr-Moson-Sopron County
18:00 CET	Rudolf 15'; Střeštík 90+1'	Report	Pavlović 41'	Stadium: ETO Park; Attendance: 300; Referee: (Hungary) István Vad

== League Cup ==
=== Group stage ===
4 September 2013 1	Kaposvár	3 – 0	Siófok	Kaposvár, Somogy County
17:00 CEST	Waltner 60'; Pécseli 61' (o.g.); Balázs 78'	(Report)		Stadium: Stadion Kaposvár Rákóczi; Attendance: 100; Referee: (Hungary) Béla Botló

11 September 2013 2	Zalaegerszeg	0 – 3	Kaposvár	Zalaegerszeg, Zala County
17:30 CEST		(Report)	Dominić 5'; Lucas 41'; Vručina 61'	Stadium: ZTE Arena; Attendance: 250; Referee: (Hungary) Zoltán J. Kovács

9 October 2013 3	Pécs	2 – 0	Kaposvár	Pécs, Baranya County
18:00 CEST	Wittrédi 19'; Rácz 90+2'	(Report)		Stadium: Stadion PMFC; Attendance: 300; Referee: (Hungary) Balázs Böcskei

16 October 2013 4	Kaposvár	2 – 1	Pécs	Kaposvár, Somogy County
16:00 CEST	Dominić 64', 78'	(Report)	Pölöskey 61'	Stadium: Stadion Kaposvár Rákóczi; Attendance: 150; Referee: (Hungary) Balázs Berke

13 November 2013 5	Kaposvár	4 – 0	Zalaegerszeg	Kaposvár, Somogy County
13:00 CET	Dominić 10'; Mărkuş 40', 53'; Vručina 69'	(Report)		Stadium: Stadion Kaposvár Rákóczi; Attendance: 100; Referee: (Hungary) Gyöngyi Gaál

20 November 2013 6	Siófok	1 – 7	Kaposvár	Siófok, Somogy County
13:00 CET	Gárdos 44'	(Report)	Lucas 17'; Petrache 30', 70'; Murai 33'; Haruna 39'; Horváth 59'; Vručina 87'	Stadium: Révesz Géza Stadion; Attendance: 50; Referee: (Hungary) Balázs Berke

==== Classification ====
Pos	Team	Pld	W	D	L	GF	GA	GD	Pts	Qualification
1	Kaposvár	6	5	0	1	19	4	+15	15	Advance to knockout phase
2	Pécs	6	3	1	2	12	8	+4	10	Advance to knockout phase
3	Siófok	6	2	1	3	7	15	−8	7	
4	Zalaegerszeg	6	1	0	5	5	16	−11	3	

Rules for classification: 1) points; 2) goal difference; 3) number of goals scored.

=== Knockout phase ===
26 February 2014 Round of 16 (1st leg)	Videoton	3 – 0	Kaposvár	Székesfehérvár, Fejér County
16:00 CET	Zé Luís 23'; Petrolina 69'; Lupeta 88'	(Report)		Stadium: Sóstói Stadion; Attendance: 1,300; Referee: (Hungary) Csaba Pintér

4 March 2014 Round of 16 (2nd leg)	Kaposvár	1 – 1 (1 – 4 agg.)	Videoton	Kaposvár, Somogy County
13:30 CET	Murai 50'	(Report)	Zé Luís 81'	Stadium: Stadion Kaposvár Rákóczi; Attendance: 250; Referee: (Hungary) Norbert Kiss

== Pre-season ==
28 June 2013 1	Kaposvári Rákóczi FC (Hungary)	1 – 5	(Russia) FC Kuban Krasnodar	Stegersbach, Austria
19:00 CEST	Pavlović 16'	(Report)	Ignatyev 27', 30'; Özbiliz 35'; Ureña 41', 85'	Referee: (Austria) Helmut Lombik

2 July 2013 2	Kaposvári Rákóczi FC (Hungary)	3 – 1	(Croatia) NK Zadar	Bakovci, Slovenia
19:00 CEST	Vručina; Waltner	(Report)		Attendance: 150; Referee: (Slovenia) Tratnje

3 July 2013 3	Kaposvári Rákóczi FC (Hungary)	1 – 1	(Bosnia and Herzegovina) FK Željezničar Sarajevo	Bakovci, Slovenia
19:00 CEST	Oláh 15'	(Report)	Sadiković 11'	Attendance: 150; Referee: (Slovenia) Tratnje

5 July 2013 4	CS Pandurii Târgu Jiu (Romania)	2 – 0	(Hungary) Kaposvári Rákóczi FC	Mattersburg, Austria
CEST	Ciucur 13'; Matulevičius 70'	(Report)		Stadium: Pappelstadion; Referee: (Austria)

7 July 2013 5	NK Osijek (Croatia)	2 – 1	(Hungary) Kaposvári Rákóczi FC	Osijek, Croatia
CEST	Škorić 32'; Pongračić 90'	(Report)	Vručina 68'	Stadium: Stadion Gradski vrt Attendance: 1,000; Referee: (Croatia)

12 July 2013 6	AFC Săgeata Năvodari (Romania)	1 – 1	(Hungary) Kaposvári Rákóczi FC	Wien, Austria
CEST	N'Doye	(Report)	Pavlović	Referee: (Austria)

18 July 2013 7	Kaposvári Rákóczi FC (Hungary)	0 – 4	(Israel) Hapoel Ramat Gan Giv'atayim F.C.	Bük, Hungary
19:00 CEST		(Report)		Referee: (Hungary)

20 July 2013 8	Kaposvári Rákóczi FC (Hungary)	1 – 1	(Turkey) Medical Park Antalyaspor	Murska Sobota, Slovenia
CEST	Markus 20'	(Report)		Referee: (Slovenia)

24 July 2013 9	Kaposvári Rákóczi FC (Hungary)	0 – 2	(Israel) Hapoel Acre	Kaposvár, Somogy County
CEST		(Report)		Referee: (Hungary)
