= List of Hungarian football transfers winter 2013–14 =

This is a list of Hungarian football transfers for the 2013–14 winter transfer window by club. Only transfers of clubs in the OTP Bank Liga will be included.

The winter transfer window opened on 1 January 2014, although a few transfers may have taken place prior to that date. The window closed at midnight on 24 February 2014. Players without a club may join one at any time, either during or in between transfer windows.

== OTP Bank Liga ==
=== Budapest Honvéd ===
In: Note: Flags indicate national team as defined under FIFA eligibility rules; some limited exceptions apply. Players may hold more than one non-FIFA nationality.

No.	Pos.	Nation	Player
9	FW	COL	Edixon Perea (from (China) Changchun)
23	FW	HUN	Bence Daru (from Honvéd II)
28	FW	ITA	Emiliano Bonazzoli (from (Italy) Marano)
37	FW	ITA	Arturo Lupoli (loan from (Italy) Varese)
92	DF	PAN	Aníbal Mello (from (Panama) Chepo)

Out: Note: Flags indicate national team as defined under FIFA eligibility rules; some limited exceptions apply. Players may hold more than one non-FIFA nationality.

No.	Pos.	Nation	Player
9	FW	COL	Edixon Perea
13	DF	HUN	Gyula Csemer
23	FW	ITA	Emanuele Testardi (loan return to (Italy) Sampdoria)

=== Debrecen ===
In: Note: Flags indicate national team as defined under FIFA eligibility rules; some limited exceptions apply. Players may hold more than one non-FIFA nationality.

No.	Pos.	Nation	Player
2	DF	HUN	István Szűcs (loan return from Békéscsaba)
10	MF	SVN	Rene Mihelič (from (Slovenia) Zavrč)
23	FW	HUN	Ádám Kovács (from Nyíregyháza)
66	FW	HUN	Tibor Tisza (from Diósgyőr)

Out: Note: Flags indicate national team as defined under FIFA eligibility rules; some limited exceptions apply. Players may hold more than one non-FIFA nationality.

No.	Pos.	Nation	Player
1	GK	MNE	Vukašin Poleksić (loan to Kecskemét)
2	DF	HUN	István Szűcs (loan to Létavértes)
5	DF	SRB	Aleksandar Trninić (to (North Macedonia) Vardar Skopje)
15	MF	HUN	László Rezes (to Nyíregyháza)
23	MF	FRA	Slimane Bouadla
66	FW	HUN	Márk Szécsi (loan to Kecskemét)

=== Diósgyőr ===
In: Note: Flags indicate national team as defined under FIFA eligibility rules; some limited exceptions apply. Players may hold more than one non-FIFA nationality.

No.	Pos.	Nation	Player
7	FW	SRB	Miroslav Grumić (from Pécs)
17	MF	HUN	Tamás Egerszegi (from Újpest)
89	MF	SRB	Lazar Marjanović (from (Serbia) Radnički Kragujevac)

Out: Note: Flags indicate national team as defined under FIFA eligibility rules; some limited exceptions apply. Players may hold more than one non-FIFA nationality.

No.	Pos.	Nation	Player
7	FW	HUN	Tibor Tisza (from Debrecen)
8	MF	HUN	Péter Takács (to Mezőkövesd)
27	DF	SVK	Michal Hanek
35	MF	BRA	Thiago Bonfim (loan to Tököl)

=== Ferencváros ===
In: Note: Flags indicate national team as defined under FIFA eligibility rules; some limited exceptions apply. Players may hold more than one non-FIFA nationality.

No.	Pos.	Nation	Player
26	DF	HUN	Tamás Grúz (loan return from Szolnok)
37	FW	HUN	Péter Antal (from Ferencváros U-19)
39	DF	CRO	Mateo Pavlović (loan from (Germany) Werder Bremen)
70	FW	HUN	Roland Ugrai (from Szombathely)
86	DF	HUN	Zsolt Laczkó (from (Italy) Sampdoria)
90	GK	HUN	Dénes Dibusz (from Pécs)

Out: Note: Flags indicate national team as defined under FIFA eligibility rules; some limited exceptions apply. Players may hold more than one non-FIFA nationality.

No.	Pos.	Nation	Player
3	DF	NED	Mark Otten (to Ferencváros II)
11	FW	NED	Arsenio Valpoort (to Ferencváros II)
14	FW	NED	Jack Tuyp (to Ferencváros II)
26	DF	HUN	Tamás Grúz (to Vasas)
35	DF	BRA	Gerson (loan return to (Austria) Kapfenberg)

=== Győr ===
In: Note: Flags indicate national team as defined under FIFA eligibility rules; some limited exceptions apply. Players may hold more than one non-FIFA nationality.

No.	Pos.	Nation	Player
1	GK	HUN	Krisztián Pogacsics (loan from (Romania) Bihor Oradea)
14	MF	LTU	Linas Pilibaitis (loan return from Mezőkövesd)

Out: Note: Flags indicate national team as defined under FIFA eligibility rules; some limited exceptions apply. Players may hold more than one non-FIFA nationality.

No.	Pos.	Nation	Player
1	GK	SRB	Saša Stevanović (end of career)
6	MF	EST	Tarmo Kink (loan return to (Italy) Varese)
14	MF	LTU	Linas Pilibaitis (to (Lithuania) Žalgiris Vilnius)
19	FW	HUN	András Simon (loan to Kecskemét)
23	DF	HUN	Tibor Tokody (end of career)

=== Kaposvár ===
In: Note: Flags indicate national team as defined under FIFA eligibility rules; some limited exceptions apply. Players may hold more than one non-FIFA nationality.

No.	Pos.	Nation	Player
6	DF	FRA	Issaga Diallo (from (Switzerland) Servette)
7	MF	ROU	Andrei Florean (from (Romania) Bihor Oradea)
8	DF	COD	Landry Mulemo (from (Israel) Beitar Jerusalem)
9	FW	EST	Tarmo Kink (from (Italy) Varese)
10	MF	ROU	Dragoș Firțulescu (from (Romania) UTA Arad)
11	MF	CMR	Armand Ella (loan from (Ukraine) Karpaty Lviv)
17	DF	FRA	Badis Lebbihi (from (France) Épinal)
23	DF	BEL	Pieter Mbemba (from (Cyprus) Omonia)
87	GK	SVN	Safet Jahič (from Zalaegerszeg)
99	GK	HUN	Botond Antal (from Kecskemét)

Out: Note: Flags indicate national team as defined under FIFA eligibility rules; some limited exceptions apply. Players may hold more than one non-FIFA nationality.

No.	Pos.	Nation	Player
2	DF	HUN	Ádám Major (to Nagyatád)
6	DF	ROU	Iulian Petrache
7	MF	SRB	Bojan Pavlović (to (Croatia) Istra)
8	MF	CRO	Stjepan Babić (to (Lithuania) Šiauliai)
9	FW	HUN	Róbert Waltner (to Siófok)
11	FW	ROU	Adrian Mărkuş (to Gaz Metan)
14	FW	HUN	Lóránt Oláh (to Kozármisleny)
16	DF	BRA	Lucas
17	FW	CRO	Bojan Vručina
20	DF	HUN	Bence Zámbó (to Tatabánya)
28	DF	HUN	Gábor Jánvári (to Nyíregyháza)
30	GK	HUN	Zsolt Posza (to Balatonlelle)
70	GK	SVN	Marko Ranilović

=== Kecskemét ===
In: Note: Flags indicate national team as defined under FIFA eligibility rules; some limited exceptions apply. Players may hold more than one non-FIFA nationality.

No.	Pos.	Nation	Player
1	GK	MNE	Vukašin Poleksić (loan from Debrecen)
5	FW	MNE	Darko Pavićević (from Zalaegerszeg)
9	FW	HUN	András Simon (loan from Győr)
16	FW	HUN	Dániel Szalai (from Kecskemét U-19)
20	FW	HUN	Márk Szécsi (loan from Debrecen)
22	DF	HUN	Mihály Bene (from Kecskemét U-19)
30	MF	TOG	Henri Eninful (loan from Újpest)
40	MF	HUN	András Burics (loan from Debrecen II)
60	MF	CIV	Brahima Touré (from (Switzerland) Lugano)
70	FW	HUN	Péter Csima (from Kecskemét U-19)
91	FW	SEN	Bebeto (loan from (Switzerland) Lugano)

Out: Note: Flags indicate national team as defined under FIFA eligibility rules; some limited exceptions apply. Players may hold more than one non-FIFA nationality.

No.	Pos.	Nation	Player
2	DF	HUN	Balázs Koszó (to Békéscsaba)
3	DF	HUN	József Mogyorósi (to Ajka)
9	FW	GUI	Ousmane Barry (to (Greece) Panachaiki)
17	MF	CGO	Christian Ebala
20	FW	BEN	Sidoine Oussou (loan return to (Norway) Vålerenga)
30	MF	MNE	Boris Bulajić
81	FW	HUN	Péter Rajczi (to Mezőkövesd)
99	GK	HUN	Botond Antal (to Kaposvár)

=== Lombard-Pápa ===
In: Note: Flags indicate national team as defined under FIFA eligibility rules; some limited exceptions apply. Players may hold more than one non-FIFA nationality.

No.	Pos.	Nation	Player
15	DF	HUN	Bence Jagodics (from Szombathely II)
20	MF	HUN	Kornél Kulcsár (loan from Szombathely)
77	FW	HUN	Richárd Horváth (from Újpest)
85	DF	HUN	Csaba Csizmadia (from Gyirmót)

Out: Note: Flags indicate national team as defined under FIFA eligibility rules; some limited exceptions apply. Players may hold more than one non-FIFA nationality.

No.	Pos.	Nation	Player
6	DF	MKD	Jasmin Mecinović (to (North Macedonia) Gorno Lisiče)
10	MF	HUN	Bence Tóth (to Paks)
12	DF	BIH	Zoran Šupić
14	MF	HUN	Krisztián Dóczi (to Ajka)
20	DF	HUN	István Rodenbücher (to MTK Budapest)
22	MF	SRB	Novica Maksimović (to (Serbia) Sloboda Užice)
28	MF	SVK	Otto Szabó (to (Slovakia) Dunajská Streda)
30	MF	COL	César Quintero (loan to (Colombia) Atlético Nacional)
40	MF	HUN	Gellért Ivancsics (to Siófok)

=== Mezőkövesd ===
In: Note: Flags indicate national team as defined under FIFA eligibility rules; some limited exceptions apply. Players may hold more than one non-FIFA nationality.

No.	Pos.	Nation	Player
12	FW	HUN	Péter Rajczi (from Kecskemét)
20	MF	HUN	Péter Takács (from Diósgyőr)
25	DF	HUN	Krisztián Vermes (from Újpest)
26	DF	HUN	Tamás Vaskó (from Videoton)
26	DF	SVK	Stanislav Velický (from (Slovakia) Dunajská Streda)
—	MF	HUN	Attila Sebe (loan return from Hatvan)

Out: Note: Flags indicate national team as defined under FIFA eligibility rules; some limited exceptions apply. Players may hold more than one non-FIFA nationality.

No.	Pos.	Nation	Player
9	MF	HUN	Csaba Bogdány (loan to Felsőtárkány)
12	MF	HUN	Márk Petneházi (to Dunaújváros)
17	FW	HUN	Ádám Hamar (to Szolnok)
18	MF	HUN	Béla Lakatos
20	MF	HUN	Ignác Irhás (to Kisvárda)
22	DF	HUN	István Bagi (to Békéscsaba)
26	DF	HUN	Tamás Vaskó (to Puskás)
77	MF	LTU	Linas Pilibaitis (loan return to Győr)
—	MF	HUN	Attila Sebe

=== MTK Budapest ===
In: Note: Flags indicate national team as defined under FIFA eligibility rules; some limited exceptions apply. Players may hold more than one non-FIFA nationality.

No.	Pos.	Nation	Player
22	DF	HUN	István Rodenbücher (from Pápa)
26	GK	HUN	György Scheilinger (loan return from Vecsés)
30	FW	HUN	Sándor Torghelle (from Videoton)
38	MF	HUN	Ádám Vass (from (Belgium) Oostende)
—	DF	HUN	Bence Deutsch (loan return from Pécs)

Out: Note: Flags indicate national team as defined under FIFA eligibility rules; some limited exceptions apply. Players may hold more than one non-FIFA nationality.

No.	Pos.	Nation	Player
20	FW	HUN	Balázs Batizi-Pócsi (loan to Tatabánya)
23	MF	HUN	Szabolcs Varga (to (Netherlands) Heerenveen)
39	FW	HUN	Péter Horváth (loan to Siófok)
—	DF	HUN	Bence Deutsch (loan to Szigetszentmiklós)

=== Paks ===
In: Note: Flags indicate national team as defined under FIFA eligibility rules; some limited exceptions apply. Players may hold more than one non-FIFA nationality.

No.	Pos.	Nation	Player
5	MF	HUN	Bence Tóth (from Pápa)
—	FW	HUN	Dániel Tóth (loan return from Balmazújváros)

Out: Note: Flags indicate national team as defined under FIFA eligibility rules; some limited exceptions apply. Players may hold more than one non-FIFA nationality.

No.	Pos.	Nation	Player
14	FW	HUN	Szabolcs Csorba (loan to Nyíregyháza)
17	MF	HUN	Attila Hullám (to Tatabánya)
27	MF	HUN	Norbert Heffler (loan to Sopron)
—	FW	HUN	Dániel Tóth (loan to Kozármisleny)

=== Pécs ===
In: Note: Flags indicate national team as defined under FIFA eligibility rules; some limited exceptions apply. Players may hold more than one non-FIFA nationality.

No.	Pos.	Nation	Player
13	FW	SRB	Milan Perić (loan from Videoton)
15	GK	HUN	Donát Helesfay (loan return from Kozármisleny)
20	MF	HUN	Miroszláv Zsdrál (loan return from Kozármisleny)
—	GK	HUN	Péter Molnár (loan return from Kozármisleny)

Out: Note: Flags indicate national team as defined under FIFA eligibility rules; some limited exceptions apply. Players may hold more than one non-FIFA nationality.

No.	Pos.	Nation	Player
3	DF	HUN	Bence Deutsch (loan return to MTK Budapest)
11	FW	SRB	Miroslav Grumić (to Diósgyőr)
12	GK	HUN	Dénes Dibusz (to Ferencváros)
33	DF	NGA	Eke Uzoma (to (Germany) SV Sandhausen)

=== Puskás ===
In: Note: Flags indicate national team as defined under FIFA eligibility rules; some limited exceptions apply. Players may hold more than one non-FIFA nationality.

No.	Pos.	Nation	Player
6	MF	HUN	Gáspár Orbán (loan return from Videoton II)
11	MF	HUN	István Berki (from Csákvár)
14	FW	MNE	Stefan Denković (from (Serbia) Vojvodina)
20	MF	HUN	Balázs Tóth (loan from Videoton)
22	DF	HUN	Tamás Vaskó (from Mezőkövesd)

Out: Note: Flags indicate national team as defined under FIFA eligibility rules; some limited exceptions apply. Players may hold more than one non-FIFA nationality.

No.	Pos.	Nation	Player
3	DF	HUN	Barna Papucsek (to Szolnok)
5	MF	ESP	Miguel Luque
8	FW	HUN	Roland Baracskai (loan to Videoton II)
10	MF	SRB	Uroš Nikolić (loan return to Videoton)
11	MF	HUN	Márk Barcsay (loan to Videoton II)
15	FW	HUN	Róbert Zsolnai (to Szolnok)
19	FW	HUN	Zsolt Gajdos (loan to Békéscsaba)
20	MF	HUN	Bálint Károly (loan to Békéscsaba)
24	DF	HUN	Csaba Vachtler (loan to Balmazújváros)
35	FW	HUN	Tibor Molnár (loan to Videoton II)
80	FW	HUN	Zsolt Haraszti (loan return to Videoton)
90	DF	FRA	Mamadou Wague

=== Szombathely ===
In: Note: Flags indicate national team as defined under FIFA eligibility rules; some limited exceptions apply. Players may hold more than one non-FIFA nationality.

No.	Pos.	Nation	Player
9	FW	HUN	Ádám Hrepka (from (Israel) Bnei Yehuda)
14	DF	HUN	Gábor Dvorschák (from (Germany) FC Carl Zeiss Jena)
75	GK	HUN	László Gyűrű (from (Slovakia) Veľký Meder)
—	FW	HUN	Richárd Czafit (loan return from Körmend)

Out: Note: Flags indicate national team as defined under FIFA eligibility rules; some limited exceptions apply. Players may hold more than one non-FIFA nationality.

No.	Pos.	Nation	Player
4	DF	HUN	Gábor Rajos (to Ajka)
9	FW	HUN	Péter Andorka (to Gyirmót)
10	MF	HUN	Kornél Kulcsár (loan to Pápa)
20	FW	HUN	Roland Ugrai (to Ferencváros)
—	FW	HUN	Richárd Czafit (loan to Balatonfüred)

=== Újpest ===
In: Note: Flags indicate national team as defined under FIFA eligibility rules; some limited exceptions apply. Players may hold more than one non-FIFA nationality.

No.	Pos.	Nation	Player
2	DF	COL	Darwin Andrade (loan from (Belgium) St. Truiden)
3	MF	BEL	Jonathan Heris (from (Belgium) Tubize)
9	FW	COD	Jean-Marc Makusu (loan from (Belgium) Standard Liège)
10	MF	MNE	Nebojša Kosović (loan from (Belgium) Standard Liège)
26	FW	HUN	Balázs Zamostny (loan return from Vasas)
28	DF	HUN	János Nagy (loan return from Szigetszentmiklós)
32	MF	HUN	Tamás Egerszegi (loan return from Gyirmót)

Out: Note: Flags indicate national team as defined under FIFA eligibility rules; some limited exceptions apply. Players may hold more than one non-FIFA nationality.

No.	Pos.	Nation	Player
2	DF	FRA	Loïc Nego (to (England) Charlton Athletic)
3	DF	HUN	Krisztián Vermes (to Mezőkövesd)
14	MF	HUN	Rajmond Toricska (loan to Kozármisleny)
18	MF	FRA	Grégory Christ (to (Belgium) White Star)
20	MF	TOG	Henri Eninful (loan to Kecskemét)
25	FW	HUN	Richárd Horváth (to Pápa)
28	DF	HUN	Ronald Erős (to Cegléd)
32	MF	HUN	Tamás Egerszegi (to Diósgyőri VTK)

=== Videoton ===
In: Note: Flags indicate national team as defined under FIFA eligibility rules; some limited exceptions apply. Players may hold more than one non-FIFA nationality.

No.	Pos.	Nation	Player
18	MF	HUN	Máté Papp (from Videoton II)
88	FW	HUN	Zsolt Haraszti (loan return from Puskás)
99	MF	SRB	Uroš Nikolić (loan return from Puskás)

Out: Note: Flags indicate national team as defined under FIFA eligibility rules; some limited exceptions apply. Players may hold more than one non-FIFA nationality.

No.	Pos.	Nation	Player
8	FW	SRB	Milan Perić (loan to Pécs)
14	FW	HUN	Sándor Torghelle (to MTK Budapest)
20	MF	HUN	Donát Zsótér (loan to Szolnok)
23	DF	HUN	Tamás Vaskó (to Mezőkövesd)
26	MF	HUN	Balázs Tóth (loan to Puskás)
66	DF	HUN	Gábor Gyepes (to (Malaysia) Sarawak)

== Ness Liga ==
=== Ajka ===
In: Note: Flags indicate national team as defined under FIFA eligibility rules; some limited exceptions apply. Players may hold more than one non-FIFA nationality.

No.	Pos.	Nation	Player
—	DF	HUN	József Mogyorósi (from Kecskemét)
—	DF	HUN	Gábor Rajos (from Szombathely)

Out: Note: Flags indicate national team as defined under FIFA eligibility rules; some limited exceptions apply. Players may hold more than one non-FIFA nationality.

No.	Pos.	Nation	Player

=== Balmazújváros ===
In: Note: Flags indicate national team as defined under FIFA eligibility rules; some limited exceptions apply. Players may hold more than one non-FIFA nationality.

No.	Pos.	Nation	Player
—	FW	HUN	Roland Vólent (loan from Budapest Honvéd II)
—	MF	HUN	Bence Bakos (from Bőcs)
—	DF	HUN	Ádám Privigyei (from Kazincbarcika)
—	DF	HUN	Csaba Vachtler (loan from Puskás)

Out: Note: Flags indicate national team as defined under FIFA eligibility rules; some limited exceptions apply. Players may hold more than one non-FIFA nationality.

No.	Pos.	Nation	Player
13	FW	HUN	Péter Urbin (loan to Dunaújváros)
21	FW	HUN	Dániel Tóth (loan return to Paks)

=== Békéscsaba ===
In: Note: Flags indicate national team as defined under FIFA eligibility rules; some limited exceptions apply. Players may hold more than one non-FIFA nationality.

No.	Pos.	Nation	Player
—	MF	GER	Thomas Prasle (from (Germany) Rot-Weiß Frankfurt)

Out: Note: Flags indicate national team as defined under FIFA eligibility rules; some limited exceptions apply. Players may hold more than one non-FIFA nationality.

No.	Pos.	Nation	Player
2	DF	HUN	Dániel Kiprich
5	DF	SVK	Dávid Radványi
8	MF	HUN	László Mészáros (to Szigetszentmiklós)
—	MF	SRB	Novica Petrović

=== Cegléd ===
In: Note: Flags indicate national team as defined under FIFA eligibility rules; some limited exceptions apply. Players may hold more than one non-FIFA nationality.

No.	Pos.	Nation	Player

Out: Note: Flags indicate national team as defined under FIFA eligibility rules; some limited exceptions apply. Players may hold more than one non-FIFA nationality.

No.	Pos.	Nation	Player

=== Dunaújváros ===
In: Note: Flags indicate national team as defined under FIFA eligibility rules; some limited exceptions apply. Players may hold more than one non-FIFA nationality.

No.	Pos.	Nation	Player
—	FW	HUN	Péter Urbin (loan from Balmazújváros)
—	MF	HUN	Márk Petneházi (from Mezőkövesd)

Out: Note: Flags indicate national team as defined under FIFA eligibility rules; some limited exceptions apply. Players may hold more than one non-FIFA nationality.

No.	Pos.	Nation	Player
9	FW	HUN	Illés Sitku
14	MF	HUN	Márk Micskó
15	MF	HUN	Botond Birtalan

=== Gyirmót ===
In: Note: Flags indicate national team as defined under FIFA eligibility rules; some limited exceptions apply. Players may hold more than one non-FIFA nationality.

No.	Pos.	Nation	Player
—	FW	HUN	Péter Andorka (from Szombathely)

Out: Note: Flags indicate national team as defined under FIFA eligibility rules; some limited exceptions apply. Players may hold more than one non-FIFA nationality.

No.	Pos.	Nation	Player
22	MF	HUN	Tamás Egerszegi (loan return to Újpest)
25	MF	HUN	László Fitos (to Kozármisleny)
26	DF	HUN	Csaba Csizmadia

=== Kozármisleny ===
In: Note: Flags indicate national team as defined under FIFA eligibility rules; some limited exceptions apply. Players may hold more than one non-FIFA nationality.

No.	Pos.	Nation	Player
—	DF	HUN	Miklós Gaál (from Pécs)
—	GK	HUN	Gergő Volcsányi (loan return from PVSK)
—	FW	HUN	Lóránt Oláh (from Kaposvár)
—	MF	HUN	László Fitos (from Gyirmót)
—	FW	HUN	Dániel Tóth (loan from Paks)

Out: Note: Flags indicate national team as defined under FIFA eligibility rules; some limited exceptions apply. Players may hold more than one non-FIFA nationality.

No.	Pos.	Nation	Player
1	GK	HUN	Péter Molnár (loan return to Pécs)
2	MF	HUN	Miroszláv Zsdrál (loan return to Pécs)

=== Nyíregyháza ===
In: Note: Flags indicate national team as defined under FIFA eligibility rules; some limited exceptions apply. Players may hold more than one non-FIFA nationality.

No.	Pos.	Nation	Player
11	FW	HUN	Ádám Kovács (loan return from Nyírbátor)
20	MF	HUN	Bertold Popovics (free agent)
—	FW	HUN	Marcell Molnár (from BKV Előre)
—	MF	HUN	László Rezes (from Debrecen)
—	DF	HUN	Gábor Jánvári (from Kaposvár)
—	MF	HUN	Róbert Kis (from Szeged)

Out: Note: Flags indicate national team as defined under FIFA eligibility rules; some limited exceptions apply. Players may hold more than one non-FIFA nationality.

No.	Pos.	Nation	Player
3	DF	HUN	László Dajka (loan to Nyírbátor)
8	MF	HUN	Tibor Minczér
11	FW	HUN	Ádám Kovács (to Debrecen)
14	MF	HUN	Szabolcs Csorba
20	MF	HUN	Bertold Popovics
87	MF	HUN	Ádám Farkas (to (Austria) Rotenturm)
95	MF	HUN	György Katona

=== Siófok ===
In: Note: Flags indicate national team as defined under FIFA eligibility rules; some limited exceptions apply. Players may hold more than one non-FIFA nationality.

No.	Pos.	Nation	Player
25	FW	HUN	András Pál (from MTK Budapest)
—	MF	HUN	Gellért Ivancsics (from Lombard-Pápa)
—	FW	HUN	Róbert Waltner (from Kaposvár)
—	FW	HUN	Péter Horváth (loan from MTK Budapest)

Out: Note: Flags indicate national team as defined under FIFA eligibility rules; some limited exceptions apply. Players may hold more than one non-FIFA nationality.

No.	Pos.	Nation	Player
12	GK	HUN	Máté Kiss
14	MF	HUN	Norbert Mokánszki
16	FW	HUN	Roland Vólent (loan return to Budapest Honvéd II)
18	FW	HUN	Tamás Szöllősi
21	MF	HUN	László Varga
23	DF	HUN	Attila Menyhárt (to Vasas)

=== Sopron ===
In: Note: Flags indicate national team as defined under FIFA eligibility rules; some limited exceptions apply. Players may hold more than one non-FIFA nationality.

No.	Pos.	Nation	Player
—	FW	HUN	Milán Faggyas (from Szolnok)
—	MF	HUN	Norbert Heffler (loan from Paks)

Out: Note: Flags indicate national team as defined under FIFA eligibility rules; some limited exceptions apply. Players may hold more than one non-FIFA nationality.

No.	Pos.	Nation	Player
9	DF	HUN	Zsolt Bognár (to Kisvárda)
39	FW	HUN	Péter Bali (to (Austria) Horitschon)

=== Szigetszentmiklós ===
In: Note: Flags indicate national team as defined under FIFA eligibility rules; some limited exceptions apply. Players may hold more than one non-FIFA nationality.

No.	Pos.	Nation	Player
—	MF	HUN	László Mészáros (from Békéscsaba)
—	MF	HUN	Árpád Majoros (from BKV Előre)

Out: Note: Flags indicate national team as defined under FIFA eligibility rules; some limited exceptions apply. Players may hold more than one non-FIFA nationality.

No.	Pos.	Nation	Player

=== Szolnok ===
In: Note: Flags indicate national team as defined under FIFA eligibility rules; some limited exceptions apply. Players may hold more than one non-FIFA nationality.

No.	Pos.	Nation	Player
—	FW	HUN	Ádám Hamar (from Mezőkövesd)
—	DF	HUN	Roland Racskó (from Csákvár)
—	FW	HUN	Róbert Zsolnai (from Puskás)

Out: Note: Flags indicate national team as defined under FIFA eligibility rules; some limited exceptions apply. Players may hold more than one non-FIFA nationality.

No.	Pos.	Nation	Player
16	FW	HUN	Milán Faggyas (to Sopron)
23	DF	HUN	Artur Papizsanszkij

=== Tatabánya ===
In: Note: Flags indicate national team as defined under FIFA eligibility rules; some limited exceptions apply. Players may hold more than one non-FIFA nationality.

No.	Pos.	Nation	Player
—	MF	SVK	Károly Czanik (from Ajka)

Out: Note: Flags indicate national team as defined under FIFA eligibility rules; some limited exceptions apply. Players may hold more than one non-FIFA nationality.

No.	Pos.	Nation	Player

=== Vasas ===
In: Note: Flags indicate national team as defined under FIFA eligibility rules; some limited exceptions apply. Players may hold more than one non-FIFA nationality.

No.	Pos.	Nation	Player
—	DF	HUN	Attila Menyhárt (from Siófok)
—	FW	HUN	Ferenczi (from (Slovakia) Veľký Meder)
—	DF	HUN	László Tamás (from Szentlőrinc)
—	DF	HUN	József Piller (from Eger)

Out: Note: Flags indicate national team as defined under FIFA eligibility rules; some limited exceptions apply. Players may hold more than one non-FIFA nationality.

No.	Pos.	Nation	Player
2	DF	BRA	Fabrício Lopes
4	MF	ROU	Horia Crişan
5	DF	GER	Tom Schulz
7	MF	GER	Bastian Hohmann (to (Germany) Erzgebirge Aue)
9	FW	HUN	Balázs Zamostny (loan return to Újpest)
11	FW	USA	Jacob Wilson
15	MF	USA	Shane Recklet
24	FW	BRA	Boka

=== Várda ===
In: Note: Flags indicate national team as defined under FIFA eligibility rules; some limited exceptions apply. Players may hold more than one non-FIFA nationality.

No.	Pos.	Nation	Player
—	MF	HUN	Balázs Venczel (from Vasas)
—	MF	HUN	Ignác Irhás (from Mezőkövesd)
—	DF	HUN	Zsolt Bognár (from Sopron)

Out: Note: Flags indicate national team as defined under FIFA eligibility rules; some limited exceptions apply. Players may hold more than one non-FIFA nationality.

No.	Pos.	Nation	Player
4	DF	HUN	György Tóth
12	FW	HUN	Tibor Soós
15	MF	HUN	László Horváth
19	MF	HUN	Valér Kapacina (loan return to Budapest Honvéd II)
24	MF	HUN	László Lakatos (to Cigánd)

=== Zalaegerszeg ===
In: Note: Flags indicate national team as defined under FIFA eligibility rules; some limited exceptions apply. Players may hold more than one non-FIFA nationality.

No.	Pos.	Nation	Player

Out: Note: Flags indicate national team as defined under FIFA eligibility rules; some limited exceptions apply. Players may hold more than one non-FIFA nationality.

No.	Pos.	Nation	Player
7	DF	HUN	Dávid Pál
11	MF	HUN	Gábor Vayer (to (Austria) Purbach)
12	GK	SVN	Safet Jahič (to Kaposvár)
16	MF	HUN	Péter Máté (to Szeged)
