= CSM Olimpia Salonta =

Romanian football club

Olimpia Salonta
- Full name: Clubul Sportiv Municipal Olimpia Salonta
- Nicknames: Salontanii (The People from Salonta)
- Short name: Olimpia
- Founded: 1911; 115 years ago as Nagyszalontai SC; 2004; 22 years ago as CSM Olimpia Salonta
- Ground: Municipal
- Capacity: 1,200
- Owner: Salonta Municipality
- Manager: Cristian Țirban
- League: Liga IV
- 2025–26: Liga IV, Bihor County, 4th of 14
Home colours	Away colours	Third colours

Clubul Sportiv Municipal Olimpia Salonta, commonly known as Olimpia Salonta, is a Romanian professional football club based in Salonta, Romania, founded in 1911. Currently the team plays in Liga IV.

== History ==
CSM Olimpia Salonta was founded in 1911 as Nagyszalontai SC – in Romanian: CS Salonta – when Transylvania was still part of Austria-Hungary.

Over the years, the team from the second city of Bihor County had several names like: SC, CS, CSM, Steaua Roşie, Metalul, Stăruința, Recolta or Olimpia, but regardless of the name, the club has become a regular presence of the 3rd and 4th league.

The best period in the history of the club was in the 60's and 70's, when Olimpia, named at that time as Steaua Roșie, Metalul and mostly Recolta played for 17 consecutive seasons in the Liga III. In the 80's the team had an oscillating route, traveling between Liga III and Liga IV, but at the end of the 1984–85, Recolta obtained the best result in its long history, 2nd place in the Liga III at only 4 points behind Înfrățirea Oradea.

In 1988 Recolta relegated again in Liga IV, being the subject of a rebranding process, the team name was changed in Olimpia and the colours were changed also, from green and yellow to white and blue. In the 90's the team had some isolated appearances in the Liga III, but with no important performances. At the end of the 2003–04 season the team promoted back to Liga III after four years, but the team was disbanded due to the foundation of Liberty Salonta, club owned by Romanian businessman Marius Vizer, who also bought the stadium for 99 years and a place directly in Liga II from CSM Medgidia. Vizer built a strong football academy and modernized the stadium managing then the best period in the history of the football from Salonta, including a promotion to Liga I at the end of 2005–06 season, but Liberty never played there, after the place was sold to UTA Arad.

Name	Period
Nagyszalontai SC	1911–1918
CS Salonta	1918–1936
CSM Salonta	1936–1946
Recolta Salonta	1946–1950
Spartac Salonta	1950–1954
Flamura Roșie Salonta	1954–1956
Stăruința Salonta	1957–1963
Steaua Roșie Salonta	1963–1968
Metalul Salonta	1968–1970
Recolta Salonta	1970–1988
Olimpia Salonta	1988–present

Olimpia Salonta was refounded in 2004 as CSM Olimpia Salonta and the colours were changed again, this time in white and red, inspired by the city's coat of arms, which has also become the logo of the club, but it played only at youth and amateur level, being all the time in the shadow of the new football club of Salonta. In 2009 Vizer gave up Liberty and the senior team was moved to Pomezeu. In 2013 the football academy was also dissolved and the people has begun to turn its face again to the old Olimpia, thing that gave a refresh to the club which promoted back to Liga IV at the end of 2012–13 Liga V season and also moved back to its original home, Stadionul Municipal, after 9 years on Stadionul Olimpia, a stadium without stands and a bad pitch. The club's main objective is the growth of young players and the discovery of new talents.

== Stadium ==
The club plays its home matches on Stadionul Municipal from Salonta, with a capacity of 1,200 seats.

== Honours ==
=== Leagues ===
Liga III:

- Runners-up (1): 1984–85

Liga IV – Bihor County

- Winners (5): 1983–84, 1989–90, 1992–93, 1998–99, 2003–04
- Runners-up (2): 1997–98, 2002–03

Liga V – Bihor County

- Winners (1): 2012–13

==== Cups ====
- Cupa României
  - Round of 32 (1): 1957–58

=== Other performances ===
- 31 seasons in Liga III

== Players ==
=== First team squad ===
As of 1 March 2025

Note: Flags indicate national team as defined under FIFA eligibility rules; some limited exceptions apply. Players may hold more than one non-FIFA nationality.

No.	Pos.	Nation	Player
1	GK	ROU	Daniel Zaha (Vice-Captain)
2	DF	ROU	Patrick Iabloncic
3	DF	ROU	Emilian Pop
4	DF	ROU	Tamás Páljános
5	MF	ROU	Alexandru Hodișan
6	DF	ROU	Călin Chișe
7	MF	ROU	Daniel Mughiuruș
8	DF	ROU	Arnold Katona (3rd captain)
9	FW	ROU	Iasmin Chiș
10	MF	ROU	Andrei Iacob (Captain)
11	MF	ROU	József Kádár
12	DF	ROU	Rareș Vâlcan

No.	Pos.	Nation	Player
13	MF	ROU	Radco Iabloncic
14	MF	ROU	Marius Pușcaș
15	MF	ROU	Laurențiu Pruncuțiu
16	FW	ROU	Laurențiu Boros
17	MF	ROU	Dănuț Budău
18	DF	ROU	Luca Vașca
19	MF	ROU	István Vándor
20	MF	ROU	Andrei Șușea
21	DF	ROU	János Bronț
99	GK	ROU	Mark Duma
—	MF	ROU	Florin Mintaș

=== Out on loan ===
Note: Flags indicate national team as defined under FIFA eligibility rules; some limited exceptions apply. Players may hold more than one non-FIFA nationality.

No. / Pos. / Nation / Player	No. / Pos. / Nation / Player

== Club officials ==
=== Board of directors ===
Role	Name
Owner	(Romania) Salonta Municipality
President	(Romania) Cristian Țirban
Vice-Presidents	(Romania) Loránd Szabó (Romania) Norbert Zsirka
Stadium Administrator	(Romania) József Gal

=== Current technical staff ===
Role	Name
Manager	(Romania) Cristian Țirban
Assistant coaches	(Romania) Loránd Szabó (Romania) Călin Chișe

== Notable former players ==
- (Romania) Elemér Kocsis
- (Romania) Dorin Mihuț (2015)
- (Romania) Lajos Sătmăreanu
