= Lacu Sărat =

Lacu Sărat may refer to:

- Lacu Sărat, Bihor, a village in the commune Pomezeu, Bihor County, Romania
- Lacu Sărat, Brăila, a village in the commune Chiscani, Brăila County, Romania
