= Vălani =

Vălani or Vălanii may refer to one of two villages in Bihor County, Romania:

- Vălani de Pomezeu, a village in Pomezeu Commune
- Vălanii de Beiuș, a village in Uileacu de Beiuș Commune
