= Lucas Rocha =

Lucas Rocha may refer to:

- Lucas Rocha (footballer, born 1991), Brazilian football defender
- Lucas Rocha (footballer, born 1995), Brazilian football centre-back
