= Luka Dominić =

Croatian footballer (born 1993)

Personal information
- Full name: Luka Dominić
- Date of birth: 1 December 1993 (age 32)
- Place of birth: Čakovec, Croatia
- Height: 1.83 m (6 ft 0 in)
- Position: Midfielder

Team information
- Current team: Jadran-Galeb

Youth career
- 2008–2011: Mladost Prelog
- 2011–2012: Slaven Belupo
- 2012: Koprivnica
- 2012–2013: Mladost Prelog

Senior career*
Years	Team	Apps	(Gls)
2013–2016	Kaposvár	44	(24)
2016–	Jadran-Galeb		
- * Club domestic league appearances and goals as of 8 August 2016

Luka Dominić (born 1 December 1993 in Čakovec) is a Croatian professional footballer who plays for Jadran-Galeb.

== Club statistics ==
Club	Season	League		Cup		League Cup		Europe		Total	
Club	Season	Apps	Goals	Apps	Goals	Apps	Goals	Apps	Goals	Apps	Goals
Kaposvár
Kaposvár	2013–14	4	0	3	0	5	4	0	0	12	4
Kaposvár	Total	4	0	3	0	5	4	0	0	12	4
Career Total		4	0	3	0	5	4	0	0	12	4

Updated to games played as of 18 May 2014.
