= Ioan Judea =

Romanian colonel (1933–2022)

Personal details
- Born: 21 April 1933 Câmpani de Pomezeu, Bihor County, Kingdom of Romania
- Died: 26 March 2022 (aged 88)

Military service
- Allegiance: Romania
- Rank: Colonel

Ioan Judea (IPA: [io̯an ʒude̯a]; 21 April 1933 – 26 March 2022) was a Romanian colonel, one of the notable figures of the ethnic clashes of Târgu Mureș. He played an important role in arming the Romanian peasants and miners of Mureș County, who were later incited against the Hungarians.

== Life ==
Judea was born in Câmpani de Pomezeu, Bihor County, Kingdom of Romania on 21 April 1933. He worked as a miller's apprentice for one year and then as a locksmith for three years. His advancement followed the rise of a local communist regime; he studied for three years in Pitești, at the Armored Officers Military School, within the socialist army. In 1955, he became a platoon leader and shortly afterwards a corps commander. He continued his studies as a military engineer at the Military Academy in Bucharest.

He was retired in 2018 after a 35-year military career, and died on 26 March 2022 aged 88.

== Participation in the ethnical clashes of 1990 ==
Judea initially accused the Hungarian minority in Romania of being separatists and seeking to separate Transylvania from Romania, in collaboration with the well-known anti-Hungarian and chauvinist Vatra Românească cultural organization.

On 19 March 1990, he brought in drunken Romanians armed with hoes, sticks and pitchforks on 13 buses; as it turned out later, he was also responsible for their transportation. He was the one who, together with General Ion Scrieciu, guaranteed the physical integrity of the Hungarians trapped in the attic, including András Sütő. At first, the Hungarians were reluctant, Judea later gave his word of honor that no one would be hurt, and asked that people come down, but those trapped in the attic continued to distrust him. Later Gheorghe Gambra, the police chief of Mureș County appeared, but only as an idle observer. Since they didn't come down even after 2 o'clock, Colonel Judea changed to a threatening tone and told them that the drunken Romanian mob will really set the attic on fire should they not come down. András Sütő witnessed that they brought gasoline from military trucks for lighting. Judea insisted that they wouldn't have any problems so some of them finally started leaving the attic.

But when Sütő decided to leave the attic, Major Vasile Țîra called on the crowd: "Now the old man is coming, treat him!" Colonel Judea watched with arms folded as one of the most outstanding literary figures of Transylvanian Hungarians was about to be beaten to death. He mockingly added: "Hey, boys, what are you doing?" He was to be tried for his indiscipline, but he was acquitted and he was free the next day.

Finally, the beaten András Sütő was lifted onto a military truck, and two other wounded Hungarians were trapped in the attic, from which the enraged crowd tore off the tarpaulin stretched on top, then some of them jumped onto the platform and beat the lying, helpless wounded with sticks. Colonel Judea, Major Țîra, and all the members of the law enforcement and the military who were present watched all this passively. Only József Gábor, a non-commissioned officer of Hungarian origin, intervened and protected Sütő with his own body only to be beaten by the Romanians in the same way. When the army saw this, two Romanian soldiers jumped onto the platform, but not to protect the injured, but to prevent it from being known that the enraged crowd had also attacked a soldier of the Romanian army.

The crowd tried to burn out András Sütő's eyes with caustic soda, but they only hit József Gábor's shirt, but they managed to burn holes in it.

In his speech on 20 March 2000, he claimed that the members of the RMDSZ planned a coup in Târgu Mureș, wanted to take over power and planned this together with Hungary, and he also tried to write a lot of baseless slander against the Hungarians. He was not allowed to deliver a speech at the commemoration 5 years later.
