= Stadionul Municipal (Salonta) =

Stadium in Romania

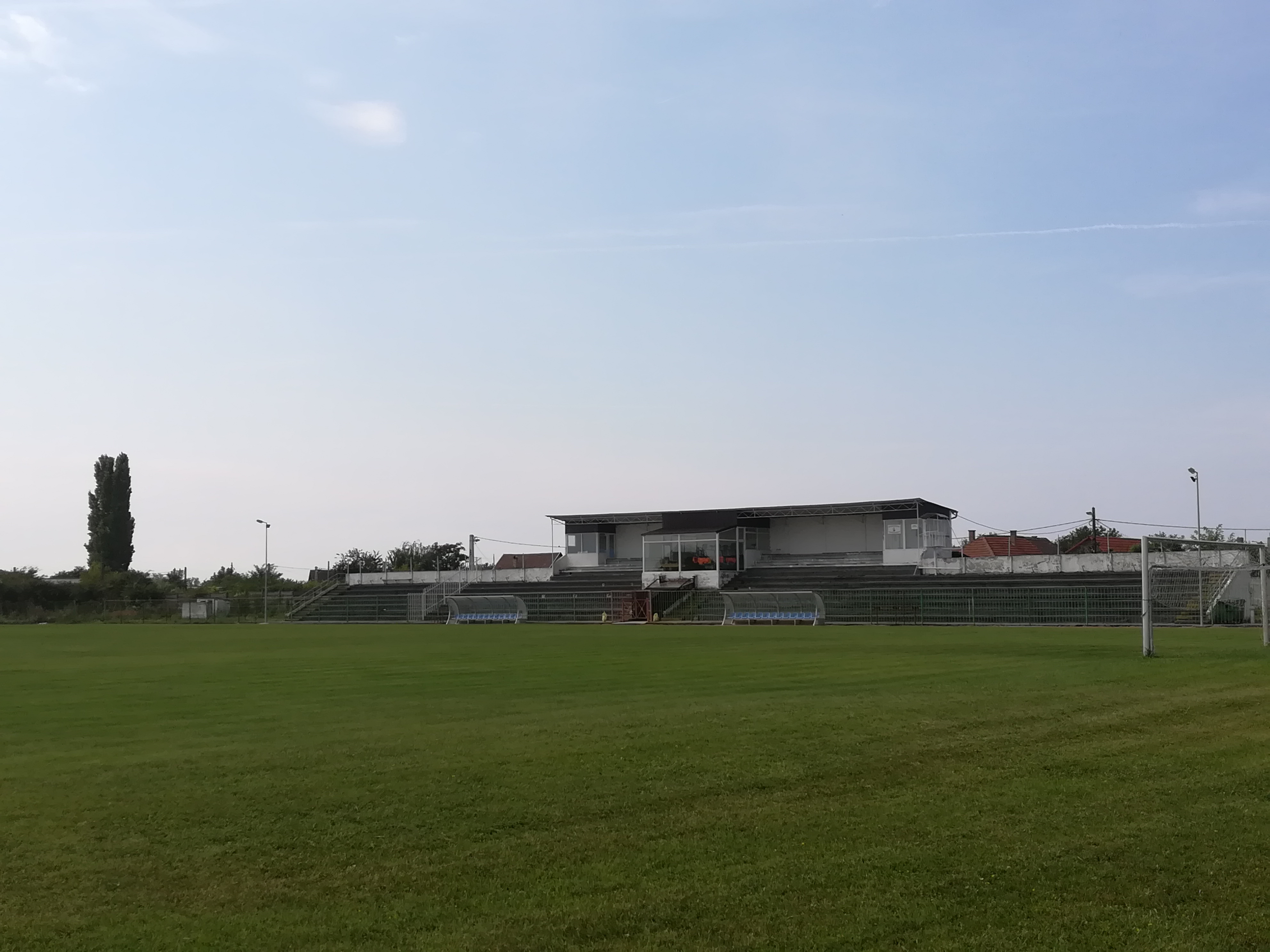
- Interactive map of Stadionul Municipal
- Former names: Stadionul Liberty (2003–2013)
- Address: Str. Sportului, nr. 2
- Location: Salonta, Romania
- Coordinates: 46°48′13″N 21°40′15″E
- Owner: Municipality of Salonta
- Operator: Olimpia Salonta
- Capacity: 1,200 (0 seated)
- Surface: Grass

Construction
- Opened: 1911

Tenants
- Olimpia Salonta (1911–2003), (2014–Present); Liberty Salonta (2003–2013)

Stadionul Municipal is a multi-purpose stadium in Salonta, Romania. It is mostly used for football matches and is the home ground of Olimpia Salonta. The stadium holds about 1,200 people.

A full-size artificial turf pitch was created at the facility in 2006.

== Events ==
=== Association football ===
International football matches
Date	Competition	Home	Away	Score	Attendance
20 June 1935	Friendly	(Romania) CS Salonta	(Austria) Sturm Graz	1 - 5	
1 June 2005	Friendly	(Romania) Liberty Salonta	(Hungary) Szeged	1 - 1	
3 March 2012	Friendly	(Romania) Bihor Oradea	(Slovakia) Bodva Moldava	0 - 0	
