= Iulian Petrache =

Romanian footballer

Personal information
- Full name: Iulian-Petrut Petrache
- Date of birth: 14 March 1991 (age 35)
- Place of birth: Comănești, Romania
- Height: 1.88 m (6 ft 2 in)
- Position: Defender

Youth career
- 2008–2010: Liberty Salonta
- 2009: → UTA Arad (loan)

Senior career*
Years	Team	Apps	(Gls)
2010–2013	Bihor Oradea	35	(1)
2013–2014	Kaposvár	11	(2)
2014	Olimpia Elbląg	8	(0)
2014–2015	FC Zalău		
2015	Unirea Jucu		
2015	Petrocub Hîncești	12	(0)
2017	South Shields		
2017–2018	Jarrow Roofing		
2018–2020	Morpeth Town		
Total		66	(3)
- * Club domestic league appearances and goals

Iulian Petrache (born 14 March 1991) is a Romanian footballer who plays as a defender.
