= Márk Murai =

Hungarian footballer

Personal information
- Full name: Márk Sándor Murai
- Date of birth: 15 July 1996 (age 30)
- Place of birth: Budapest, Hungary
- Height: 1.87 m (6 ft 2 in)
- Position: Forward

Team information
- Current team: Budaörs
- Number: 11

Youth career
- 2007–2013: Ferencváros
- 2013–2014: Kaposvár

Senior career*
Years	Team	Apps	(Gls)
2014–2015	Kaposvár	14	(0)
2015	Zalaegerszeg	10	(1)
2015	Dunaújváros	2	(0)
2016	Eastbourne		
2017	TSG Sprockhövel	10	(0)
2017–2018	Mezőkövesd	0	(0)
2018	→ Kazincbarcika (loan)	9	(2)
2018–2019	Vác	27	(6)
2019–2021	Budapesti VSC	14	(15)
2021–2022	Csákvár	19	(1)
2022–	Budaörs	6	(0)
- * Club domestic league appearances and goals as of 13:47, 2 December 2019 (UTC)

Márk Sándor Murai (born 15 July 1996) is a Hungarian football player who plays for Budaörs.

== Career statistics ==
Appearances and goals by club, season and competition
Club	Season	League			Cup		League Cup		Europe		Total	
Club	Season	Division	Apps	Goals	Apps	Goals	Apps	Goals	Apps	Goals	Apps	Goals
Kaposvár	2013–14	Nemzeti Bajnokság I	12	0	1	0	5	2	0	0	18	2
Career total			12	0	1	0	5	2	0	0	18	2

Updated to games played as of 1 June 2014.
