= Andrei Florean =

Romanian footballer

Personal information
- Full name: Andrei Alexandru Florean
- Date of birth: 3 April 1992 (age 34)
- Place of birth: Comănești, Romania
- Height: 1.70 m (5 ft 7 in)
- Position: Right midfielder

Youth career
- 2001–2004: Avram Iancu Comănești
- 2004–2007: Liberty Salonta

Senior career*
| Years | Team | Apps | (Gls) |
| 2007–2009 | Liberty Salonta | 14 | (0) |
| 2009–2010 | → ACU Arad (loan) | | |
| 2010–2013 | Bihor Oradea | 74 | (4) |
| 2013–2014 | → Săgeata Năvodari (loan) | 11 | (0) |
| 2014 | Kaposvár | 13 | (0) |
| 2014–2015 | Pápa | 7 | (0) |
| 2015–2016 | Gaz Metan Mediaș | 5 | (0) |
| 2016–2018 | Roman | 49 | (11) |
| 2018–2019 | Pașcani | 8 | (2) |
| 2019–2021 | Știința Miroslava | 38 | (12) |

International career^{‡}
| 2008–2009 | Romania U17 | 3 | (0) |
| 2011–2012 | Romania U19 | 5 | (2) |
| 2012–2014 | Romania U21 | 3 | (0) |
- * Club domestic league appearances and goals as of 11:55, 19 April 2022 (UTC) ‡ National team caps and goals as of 18 September 2016

Andrei Alexandru Florean (born 3 April 1992) is a Romanian professional footballer who plays as a right midfielder.

== Club career ==
Florean made his Liga I debut playing for Săgeata Năvodari on 20 July 2013 in a match against Gaz Metan Mediaș.

== International career ==
On 29 February 2012, he made his debut for the Romania U-21 in a friendly against Czech Republic.
