= Andrei Coroian =

Romanian footballer

Personal information
- Full name: Andrei Ion Coroian
- Date of birth: 28 January 1991 (age 35)
- Place of birth: Câmpia Turzii, Romania
- Height: 1.81 m (5 ft 11 1/2 in)
- Position: Midfielder

Youth career
- 2008–2010: Liberty Salonta
- 2008: → Brescia (loan)

Senior career*
Years	Team	Apps	(Gls)
2008–2009	Brescia	2	(0)
2010–2013	Bihor Oradea	51	(4)
2013–2014	Kaposvár	16	(1)
2014–2015	Pápa	7	(1)
2015	Bihor Oradea	10	(1)
2016–2019	Szeged	91	(5)
2019–2020	Minaur Baia Mare	11	(1)
Total		188	(13)

International career^{‡}
2009–2011	Romania U-19	22	(3)
- * Club domestic league appearances and goals as of 10 September 2020 ‡ National team caps and goals as of 28 February 2018

Andrei Ion Coroian (born 28 January 1991) is a Romanian footballer.

== Club statistics ==
Club	Season	League		Cup		League Cup		Europe		Total	
Club	Season	Apps	Goals	Apps	Goals	Apps	Goals	Apps	Goals	Apps	Goals
Bihor Oradea
Bihor Oradea	2010–11	8	1	0	0	0	0	0	0	8	1
Bihor Oradea	2011–12	24	2	0	0	0	0	0	0	24	2
Bihor Oradea	2012–13	19	1	0	0	0	0	0	0	19	1
Bihor Oradea	Total	51	4	0	0	0	0	0	0	51	4
Kaposvár
Kaposvár	2013–14	16	1	2	0	4	0	0	0	22	1
Kaposvár	Total	16	1	2	0	4	0	0	0	22	1
Pápa
Pápa	2014–15	7	1	0	0	6	0	0	0	13	1
Pápa	Total	7	1	0	0	6	0	0	0	13	1
Career Total		74	6	2	0	10	0	0	0	86	6

Updated to games played as of 30 November 2014.
