= Tarmo Kink =

Estonian footballer

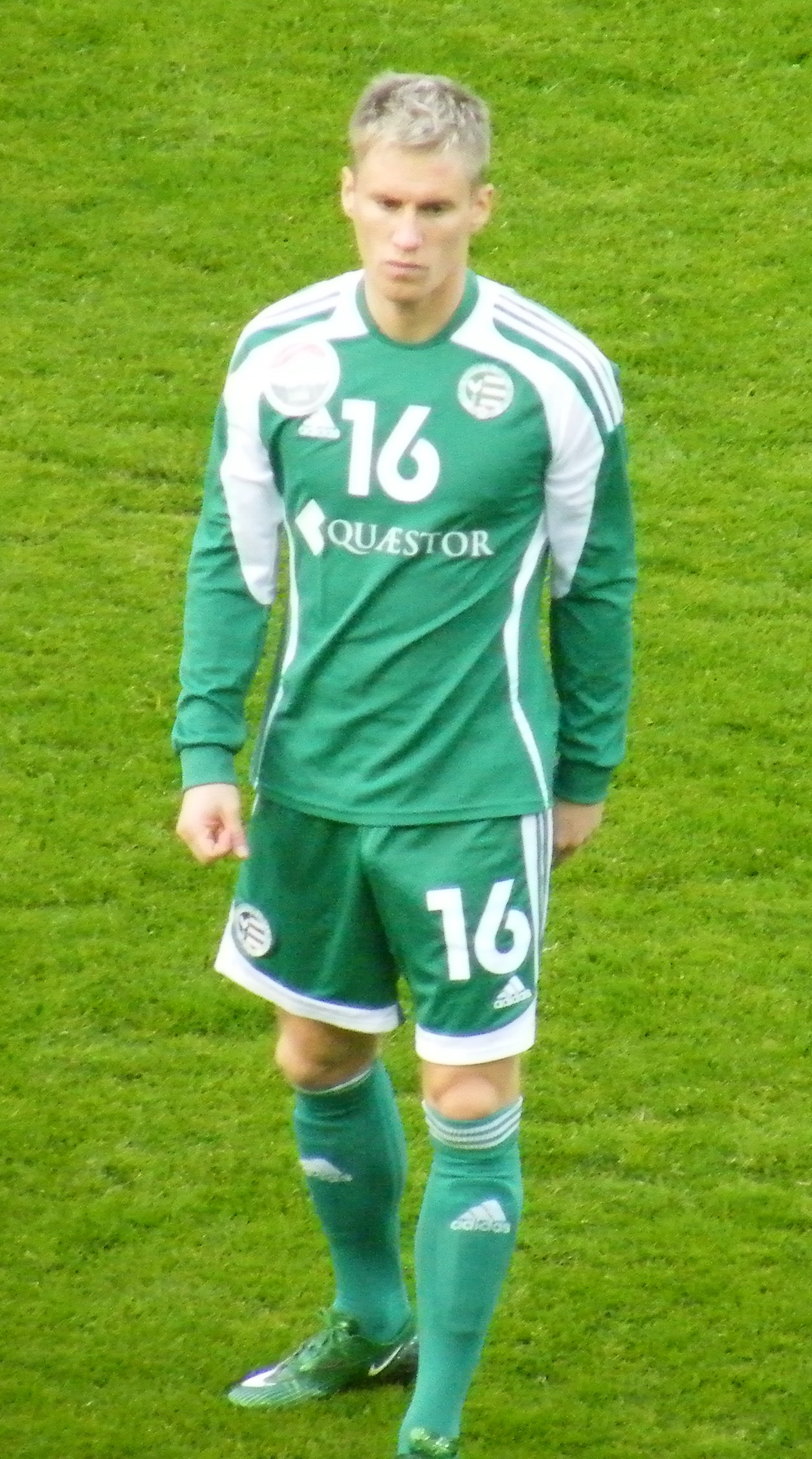
- Kink with Győr in 2009

Personal information
- Date of birth: 6 October 1985 (age 41)
- Place of birth: Tallinn, then part of Estonian SSR, Soviet Union
- Positions: Winger; forward

Youth career
- –2000: Tallinna Jalgpalliklubi

Senior career*
Years	Team	Apps	(Gls)
2001–2003	S.C. Real	15	(46)
2001	→ Viimsi (loan)	6	(31)
2002	→ Narva Trans (loan)	24	(4)
2003–2006	Spartak Moscow	2	(0)
2006–2008	Levadia	80	(35)
2009–2010	Győr	40	(15)
2010–2012	Middlesbrough	22	(4)
2012	Karpaty Lviv	5	(0)
2012–2014	Varese	12	(0)
2013	→ Győr (loan)	18	(2)
2014	Kaposvár	12	(4)
2015	Inverness Caledonian Thistle	5	(0)
2015	Levadia	19	(5)
2015	Levadia II	1	(2)
2016	SJK	12	(2)
2016–2017	Mezőkövesd	25	(3)
2017	Levadia	14	(3)

International career
	Estonia U15	4	(0)
	Estonia U18	1	(0)
	Estonia U19	6	(1)
	Estonia U21	5	(0)
2004–2014	Estonia	82	(6)
- * Club domestic league appearances and goals

Tarmo Kink (born 6 October 1985) is an Estonian former footballer who played as a winger. He is the current manager of Paide Linnameeskond.

== Club career ==
=== Early career ===
In 2001, Kink started his career with S.C. Real, scoring 46 goals in 15 games. In 2001, Kink spent a short loan spell with Viimsi. He scored 31 goals in just 6 games, including 9 goals in a single match against Sillamäe Kalev. He spent the 2002 Meistriliiga season on loan at the Meistriliiga club Narva Trans, where he made 24 appearances, mostly as a substitute.

=== Spartak Moscow ===
In 2003, at the age of 17, Kink signed a five-year contract with the Russian Premier League club Spartak Moscow. Kink made his debut for Spartak Moscow on 6 February 2003, against Shchyolkovo in a friendly match. He played his first Russian Premier League match on 23 August 2003, in a 2–0 defeat against Rubin Kazan. Kink mostly played for Spartak Moscow's reserves in Russia, although he did make two league appearances, as well as coming on as a substitute in a UEFA Cup third round defeat to Mallorca. In 2006, after failing to break into the first team, Kink returned to Estonia.

=== Levadia ===
On 6 July 2006, Kink signed a two-year contract with Meistriliiga club Levadia. Three days later, Kink played his first Meistriliiga game for Levadia in a derby against Flora. He scored his first Meistriliiga goal for Levadia on 23 July 2006, in a 3–1 victory over TVMK. On 8 March 2008, Kink extended his current contract with Levadia until 30 November 2009. On 28 July 2008, he was close to signing a three-year contract with Romanian Liga I club Gloria Buzău for a fee of €200,000, but rejected the offer, because he didn't find the conditions in Romania suitable. On 29 July 2008, it was reported that Kink would go on trial to Dutch club De Graafschap. However he did not get a chance to impress, picking up a knee injury just five minutes into his first training session with the club and returned to Estonia.

=== Győr ===
In January 2009, Kink signed a three-and-a-half-year contract with Hungarian side Győr. He scored 3 goals in 12 matches in his first season in Hungary. Kink finished the 2009–10 Nemzeti Bajnokság I as the club's top scorer with 12 goals from 28 matches. He also scored 3 goals in 2 matches against Slovak side Nitra in the qualifying phase of the 2010–11 UEFA Europa League.

=== Middlesbrough ===
On 27 July 2010, Kink signed a three-year contract with English Championship side Middlesbrough for a reported transfer fee of £850,000. Kink made his debut on 7 August 2010, replacing Justin Hoyte on the 60th minute of the 1–3 league defeat to Ipswich Town. Kink scored his first goal on 14 September 2010, against Burnley, coming off the bench in the 75th minute. His second goal followed in the 94th minute from a 30-yard freekick smashed into the top left corner; the game finished 2–1 to Middlesbrough. On 6 November 2010, he scored in his club's 2–1 win over Crystal Palace. After a few months without playing, Kink was chosen to play against Ipswich Town. After that he made several substitute appearances, including one against Coventry City on 25 April, in which he scored a 92nd-minute winner. Throughout his time with Middlesbrough, Kink struggled for first team football. In February 2012, Kink and Middlesbrough decided to terminate his contract, making him a free agent.

=== Karpaty Lviv ===
In February 2012, Kink signed a contract with Ukrainian side Karpaty Lviv, which was supposed to last until the end of the season in May, but was terminated in April 2012.

=== Varese ===
In August 2012, Kink signed with Italian Serie B club Varese.

=== Return to Győr ===
In January 2013, Kink returned to Győr on a one-year loan spell from Varese in search of more playing time.

=== Inverness Caledonian Thistle ===
In March 2015, Kink signed for Scottish Premiership club Inverness Caledonian Thistle until the end of the season. He made his debut later that month, coming on as a substitute in a Scottish Cup game against Raith Rovers. He made his league debut coming off the bench in a match against Partick Thistle. Kink was an unused substitute in the 2015 Scottish Cup Final Inverness won.

=== Return to Levadia (2015) ===
On 8 July 2015, Kink returned to his former club Levadia.

=== SJK ===
In January 2016, Kink signed a contract with Finnish champion side SJK for the 2016 season.

=== Mezőkövesd ===
In July 2016, Kink left SJK and signed for Hungarian club Mezőkövesd.

=== Return to Levadia (2017) ===
On 9 August 2017, Kink once again rejoined his former club Levadia. After the season end in autumn, when Levadia merged with FCI, he left the club and had an operation in December, being free agent since.

=== Retirement ===
Since retiring from playing, Kink was a sporting director at Levadia and now is a coach at Paide Linnameeskond.

== International career ==
Kink made his Estonia national football team debut on 31 March 2004 against Northern Ireland in a friendly match. He scored his first national team goal from a penalty on 27 May 2008, in a 1–1 draw against Georgia. Eight days later Kink scored his second goal for Estonia against Faroe Islands in another friendly match. On 8 October 2010, Kink scored from a beautiful long range effort in a UEFA Euro 2012 qualifying match against Serbia, equalizing the game at 1–1 in the 63rd minute as Estonia went on to win 3–1.

== Career statistics ==
=== Club ===
As of 31 May 2017.

Club	Season	League			Cup		League Cup		Europe		Other		Total	
Club	Season	Division	Apps	Goals	Apps	Goals	Apps	Goals	Apps	Goals	Apps	Goals	Apps	Goals
S.C. Real	2001	II liiga	9	30			—		—				9	30
S.C. Real	2003	II liiga	6	16			—		—				6	16
S.C. Real	Total		15	46			—		—				15	46
Viimsi (loan)	2002	III liiga	6	31			—		—				6	31
Narva Trans (loan)	2002	Meistriliiga	24	4			—		—				24	4
Spartak Moscow	2003	Russian Premier League	2	0			—		0	0			2	0
Spartak Moscow	2004	Russian Premier League	0	0			—		3	0			3	0
Spartak Moscow	2005	Russian Premier League	0	0			—		—				0	0
Spartak Moscow	2006	Russian Premier League	0	0			—		—				0	0
Spartak Moscow	Total		2	0			—		3	0			5	0
Levadia	2006	Meistriliiga	16	3			—		6	0	0	0	22	3
Levadia	2007	Meistriliiga	31	16			—		4	0	0	0	35	16
Levadia	2008	Meistriliiga	33	16			—		2	1	4	0	39	17
Levadia	Total		80	35			—		12	1	4	0	96	36
Győr	2008–09	Nemzeti Bajnokság I	12	3					—				12	3
Győr	2009–10	Nemzeti Bajnokság I	28	12	1	0			—				29	12
Győr	2010–11	Nemzeti Bajnokság I	0	0	0	0			4	3			4	3
Győr	Total		40	15	1	0			4	3			45	18
Middlesbrough	2010–11	Championship	21	4	0	0	1	0	—		0	0	22	4
Middlesbrough	2011–12	Championship	1	0	1	0	0	0	—		0	0	2	0
Middlesbrough	Total		22	4	1	0	1	0	—		0	0	24	4
Karpaty Lviv	2011–12	Ukrainian Premier League	5	0	0	0	—		—		—		5	0
Varese	2012–13	Serie B	10	0	2	0	—		—		—		12	0
Győr (loan)	2012–13	Nemzeti Bajnokság I	10	1	5	2	1	0	—		—		16	3
Győr (loan)	2013–14	Nemzeti Bajnokság I	8	1	0	0	0	0	1	0	—		9	1
Győr (loan)	Total		18	2	5	2	1	0	1	0	—		25	4
Kaposvár	2013–14	Nemzeti Bajnokság I	12	4	0	0	0	0	—		—		12	4
Inverness Caledonian Thistle	2014–15	Scottish Premiership	5	0	1	0	0	0	—		—		6	0
Levadia II	2015	Esiliiga	1	2	0	0	—		—		—		1	2
Levadia	2015	Meistriliiga	19	5	2	0	—		0	0	0	0	21	5
SJK	2016	Veikkausliiga	12	2	1	0	5	0	0	0	—		18	2
Mezőkövesd	2016–17	Nemzeti Bajnokság I	25	3	4	0	—		—		—		29	3
Career total			296	153	17	2	7	0	20	4	1	0	344	159

=== International ===
As of 19 November 2016.

National team	Year	Apps	Goals
Estonia	2004	5	0
Estonia	2007	12	0
Estonia	2008	12	3
Estonia	2009	11	0
Estonia	2010	8	1
Estonia	2011	10	1
Estonia	2012	11	0
Estonia	2013	11	1
Estonia	2014	2	0
Total		82	6

=== International goals ===
Estonia score listed first, score column indicates score after each Kink goal.

International goals by date, venue, cap, opponent, score, result and competition
No.	Date	Venue	Opponent	Score	Result	Competition
1	27 May 2008	A. Le Coq Arena, Tallinn, Estonia	Georgia	1–0	1–1	Friendly
2	4 June 2008	A. Le Coq Arena, Tallinn, Estonia	Faroe Islands	3–0	4–3	Friendly
3	12 November 2008	A. Le Coq Arena, Tallinn, Estonia	Latvia	1–0	1–1	Friendly
4	8 October 2010	Partizan Stadium, Belgrade, Serbia	Serbia	1–1	3–1	UEFA Euro 2012 qualifying
5	6 September 2011	A. Le Coq Arena, Tallinn, Estonia	Northern Ireland	2–0	4–1	UEFA Euro 2012 qualifying
6	10 September 2013	Ferenc Puskás Stadium, Budapest, Hungary	Hungary	1–3	1–5	2014 FIFA World Cup qualification

== Honours ==
=== Club ===
Levadia

- Meistriliiga: 2006, 2007, 2008
- Estonian Cup: 2006–07

Győr

- Nemzeti Bajnokság I: 2012–13
- Szuperkupa: 2013

Inverness Caledonian Thistle

- Scottish Cup: 2014–15

=== Individual ===
- Estonian Silverball: 2010
