= Patrik Böjte =

Hungarian footballer

Personal information
- Full name: Patrik Böjte
- Date of birth: 18 June 1993 (age 33)
- Place of birth: Kaposvár, Hungary
- Height: 1.80 m (5 ft 11 in)
- Position: Midfielder

Team information
- Current team: Kaposvár
- Number: 26

Youth career
- 2007–2008: Haladás
- 2008–2014: Kaposvár

Senior career*
| Years | Team | Apps | (Gls) |
| 2014– | Kaposvár | 5 | (0) |
- * Club domestic league appearances and goals as of 1 June 2014

Patrik Böjte (born 18 June 1993 in Kaposvár) is a Hungarian football player who currently plays for Kaposvári Rákóczi FC.

== Career statistics ==
Appearances and goals by club, season and competition
| Club | Season | League | | | Cup | | League Cup | | Europe | | Total | |
| Club | Season | Division | Apps | Goals | Apps | Goals | Apps | Goals | Apps | Goals | Apps | Goals |
|---|---|---|---|---|---|---|---|---|---|---|---|---|
Kaposvár
| Kaposvár | 2012–13 | Nemzeti Bajnokság I | 0 | 0 | 0 | 0 | 3 | 0 | 0 | 0 | 3 | 0 |
| Kaposvár | 2013–14 | Nemzeti Bajnokság I | 5 | 0 | 3 | 0 | 5 | 0 | 0 | 0 | 13 | 0 |
| Kaposvár | Total | | 5 | 0 | 3 | 0 | 8 | 0 | 0 | 0 | 16 | 0 |
| Career total | | | 5 | 0 | 3 | 0 | 8 | 0 | 0 | 0 | 16 | 0 |

Updated to games played as of 1 June 2014.
