= Milán Földes =

Hungarian footballer

Personal information
- Full name: Milán Földes
- Date of birth: 9 April 1993 (age 33)
- Place of birth: Székesfehérvár, Hungary
- Height: 1.75 m (5 ft 9 in)
- Position: Defender

Team information
- Current team: FC Dabas

Youth career
- 2003–2005: Videoton
- 2005–2006: Zalaegerszeg
- 2006: Felcsút
- 2006–2012: MKT

Senior career*
Years	Team	Apps	(Gls)
2013–2015	Kaposvár	19	(0)
2015–2016	Dorogi	?	(?)
2016–2017	ETO FC Győr	?	(?)
2016–2017	→ SZTK (loan)	?	(?)
2017–	FC Dabas	?	(?)

International career
2009–2010	Hungary U-17	3	(1)
2010–2011	Hungary U-19	2	(0)
- * Club domestic league appearances and goals as of 21 December 2017

Milán Földes (born 9 April 1993 in Székesfehérvár) is a Hungarian professional footballer who plays for FC Dabas.

== Career statistics ==
Appearances and goals by club, season and competition
Club	Season	League			Cup		League Cup		Europe		Total	
Club	Season	Division	Apps	Goals	Apps	Goals	Apps	Goals	Apps	Goals	Apps	Goals
Kaposvár
Kaposvár	2011–12	Nemzeti Bajnokság I	0	0	0	0	1	0	0	0	1	0
Kaposvár	2012–13	Nemzeti Bajnokság I	0	0	0	0	4	0	0	0	4	0
Kaposvár	2013–14	Nemzeti Bajnokság I	5	0	1	0	6	0	0	0	12	0
Kaposvár	Total		5	0	1	0	11	0	0	0	17	0
Career total			5	0	1	0	11	0	0	0	17	0

Updated to games played as of 4 March 2014.
