= Pieter Mbemba =

Belgian footballer (born 1988)

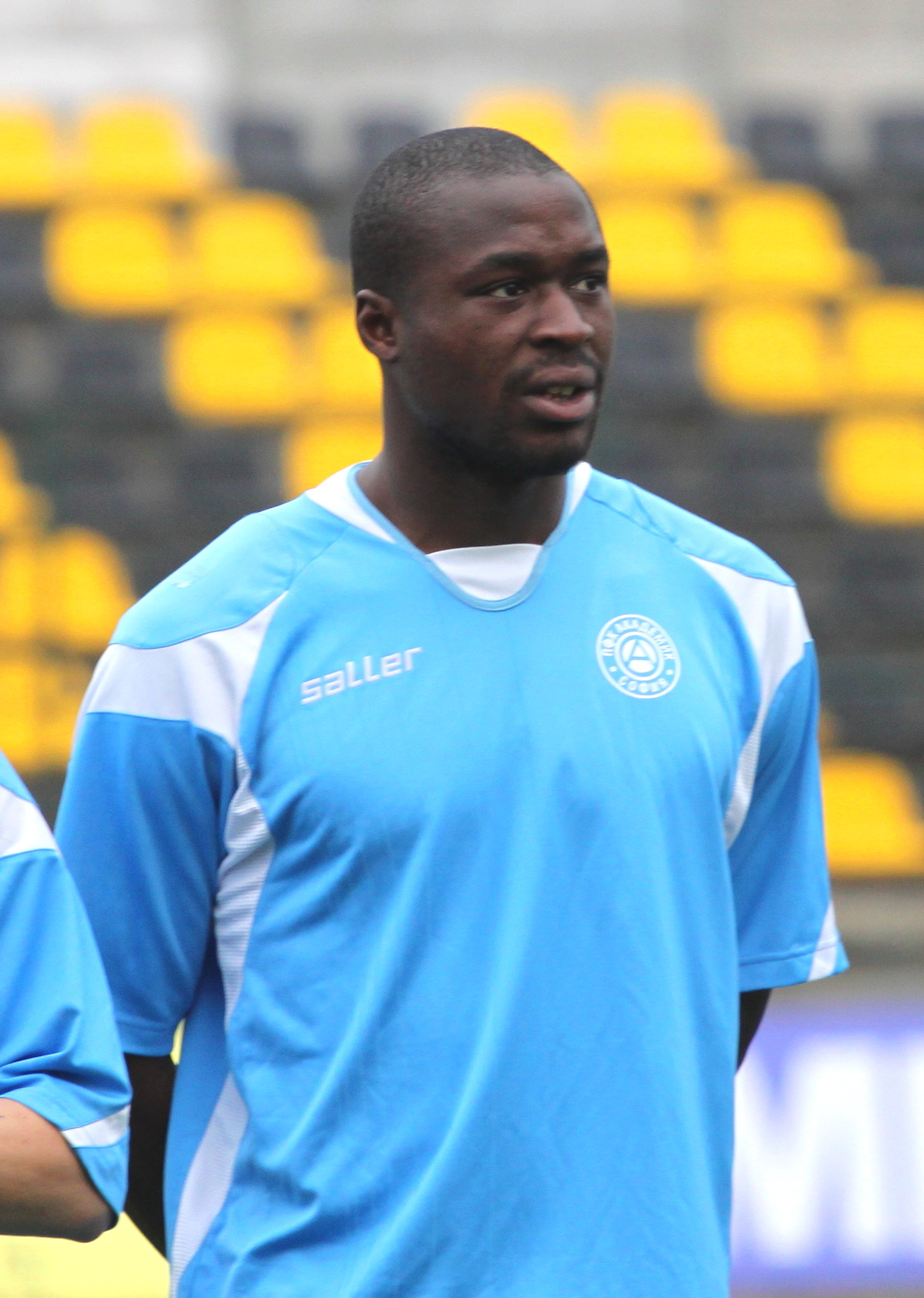

Personal information
- Full name: Pierre Emanuel Mbemba
- Date of birth: 23 July 1988 (age 38)
- Place of birth: Kinshasa, Zaire
- Height: 1.87 m (6 ft 1 1/2 in)
- Position: Defender

Senior career*
| Years | Team | Apps | (Gls) |
| 2008–2009 | Mechelen | 1 | (0) |
| 2008–2009 | → Eindhoven (loan) | 13 | (1) |
| 2009–2010 | Sivasspor | 2 | (0) |
| 2010 | → Bucaspor (loan) | 9 | (0) |
| 2010–2011 | Akademik Sofia | 26 | (1) |
| 2011–2013 | Bnei Sakhnin | 39 | (3) |
| 2013–2014 | Omonia | 0 | (0) |
| 2014–2015 | Kaposvár | 9 | (0) |
| 2015–2016 | Atlético CP | 46 | (0) |
| 2017 | Akritas Chloraka | 8 | (0) |
| 2017 | Anagennisi Deryneia | 4 | (0) |
- * Club domestic league appearances and goals as of 19 December 2015

Pierre Emanuel "Pieter" Mbemba (born 23 July 1988) is a Belgian professional footballer who plays as a defender.

== Career ==
Mbemba has played in Belgium, the Netherlands, Turkey, Bulgaria, Israel and Cyprus for KV Mechelen, FC Eindhoven, Sivasspor, Bucaspor, Bnei Sakhnin and Omonia.
