= Issaga Diallo =

French–Senegalese footballer (born 1987)

Personal information
- Date of birth: 26 January 1987 (age 39)
- Place of birth: Goudiry, Senegal
- Height: 1.92 m (6 ft 4 in)
- Position: Midfielder

Senior career*
Years	Team	Apps	(Gls)
- Montceau Bourgogne
2003	Saint-Louis Neuweg		
2003–2010	Locarno	56	(0)
2011–2014	Servette	34	(0)
2014	Kaposvár	12	(0)
2014	Cambridge United	8	(1)
2015–2017	Anagennisi Deryneia	47	(3)
2017	Foresta Suceava	16	(0)
2018	ASIL Lysi	7	(1)
- * Club domestic league appearances and goals

Issaga Diallo (born 26 January 1987) is a French–Senegalese former professional footballer who played as a midfielder.

== Career ==
Diallo signed for League Two club Cambridge United on 5 August 2014 on a free transfer.
