= CF Liberty Oradea =

Romanian football club

Liberty Oradea
- Full name: Centrul de Fotbal Liberty Oradea
- Short name: Liberty
- Founded: 2003
- Dissolved: 2017
Home colours	Away colours

Liberty Oradea was a Romanian football club from Pomezeu, Bihor County, founded in 2003 and dissolved in 2017.

The club last played in the Liga V in the 2016–17 season.

== History ==
At the end of the 2005–06 season it promoted for the very first time in its history to the Liga I, after only 3 years of existence. But it never had a chance to play there, because it sold its place to UTA Arad.

In its last years the club could be seen playing constantly in the Liga IV, as Liberty Oradea, but the club was relocated from Salonta to Pomezeu. In the summer of 2017 the club was dissolved and the old club of Pomezeu, Vida was refounded.

== Stadium ==
The club used to play its home matches on Stadionul Liberty in Salonta, but after the relocation, the club played its home matches on Stadionul Pomezeu in Pomezeu.

== Honours ==
Liga II:

- Winners (1): 2005–06

Liga III:

- Winners (1): 2006–07

== Notable former players ==
The footballers enlisted below have had international cap(s) for their respective countries at junior and/or senior level. Players whose name is listed in bold represented their countries at junior and/or senior level on through the time's passing. These players have also had a significant number of caps and goals accumulated throughout a certain number of seasons for the club itself as well.

Romania

- (Romania) **Cristian Bălgrădean**
- (Romania) Cristian Bud
- (Romania) **Cristian Cigan**
- (Romania) **Andrei Coroian**
- (Romania) Cristian Danci
- (Romania) **Sergiu Homei**
- (Romania) **Adrian Mărkuș**
- (Romania) Laurențiu Rus
- (Romania) Bogdan Străuț
- (Romania) **George Pușcaș**

Hungary

- (Hungary) **Bálint Bajner**
- (Hungary) **Iván Balaskó**
- (Hungary) **Gábor Demjén**
- (Hungary) **Pál Lázár**
- (Hungary) **Tamás Takács**

Ghana

- (Ghana) **William Amamoo**

== Former managers ==
- (Romania) Adrian Văsâi (2005)
- (Romania) Tibor Selymes (2007–2009)
