= Badis Lebbihi =

French-Algerian footballer (born 1990)

Personal information
- Full name: Badis Lebbihi
- Date of birth: 14 March 1990 (age 36)
- Place of birth: Nanterre, France
- Height: 1.87 m (6 ft 2 in)
- Position: Defender

Team information
- Current team: USM El Harrach
- Number: 17

Youth career
- –2010: Paris
- 2005–2006: Clairefontaine
- 2007–2008: Lille

Senior career*
| Years | Team | Apps | (Gls) |
| 2008–2009 | Lille | 27 | (0) |
| 2011–2013 | Zulte Waregem | 3 | (0) |
| 2014–2015 | Dijon | 8 | (0) |
| 2015–2017 | Épinal | 14 | (0) |
| 2018–2020 | Kaposvár | 10 | (0) |
| 2017–2018 | USM El Harrach | 29 | (0) |

International career^{‡}
| 2011–2013 | France U-17 | 9 | (2) |
| 2014–2015 | France U-19 | | |
- * Club domestic league appearances and goals as of 30 July 2016 ‡ National team caps and goals as of 09:09, 19 June 2010 (UTC)

Badis Lebbihi (born 14 March 1990) is a French-Algerian footballer who plays as a defender.

== Career ==
Born in Nanterre, Lebbihi began his career with RC Paris and joined than to INF Clairefontaine. After two years with INF Clairefontaine signed a youth contract with Lille OSC in 2006 and played his debut in the Ligue 1 on 24 November 2007 against AS Nancy.

On 19 June 2009, Lebbihi left Lille OSC to sign a three-year deal with SV Zulte-Waregem.

== International career ==
Lebbihi has already represented France at the U-17 and U-18 level. According to Algerian newspaper El Khabar, Lebbihi will join the Algerian U-20 team in a set of friendlies against Tunisia in March 2009.
