= Safet Jahič =

Slovenian footballer

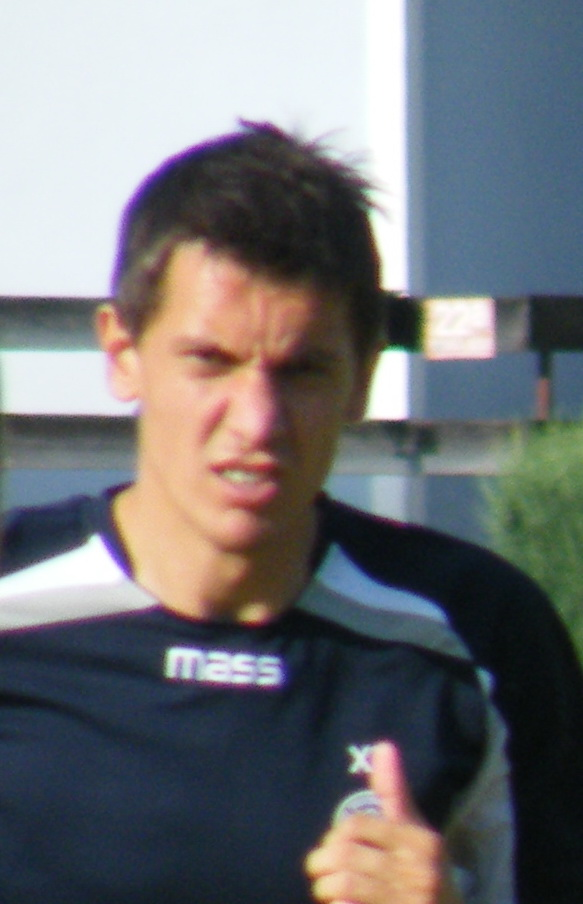
- Jahič with Zalaegerszeg in 2011

Personal information
- Full name: Safet Jahič
- Date of birth: 25 January 1987 (age 39)
- Place of birth: Slovenj Gradec, Slovenia
- Height: 1.98 m (6 ft 6 in)
- Position: Goalkeeper

Team information
- Current team: Nafta Lendava
- Number: 1

Youth career
- 2004–2005: Rudar Velenje

Senior career*
Years	Team	Apps	(Gls)
2005–2006	Panionios	0	(0)
2006–2007	Partizan	5	(0)
2007–2011	Rudar Velenje	52	(0)
2011–2013	Zalaegerszeg	53	(0)
2014	Kaposvár	2	(0)
2015	Dunaújváros	1	(0)
2016	SV Oberwart	13	(0)
2017	SV Ollersdorf	14	(0)
2017	Csácsbozsok	15	(0)
2018	SV Neuberg	15	(0)
2018–2021	Csácsbozsok	46	(0)
2021	SV Stegersbach	1	(0)
2022–	Nafta Lendava	0	(0)

International career
2003	Slovenia U17 (Note: Only official UEFA matches included)	3	(0)
2006	Slovenia U19	2	(0)
2007	Slovenia U21	7	(0)
- * Club domestic league appearances and goals as of 3 November 2023

Safet Jahič (born 25 January 1987) is a Slovenian professional footballer who plays as a goalkeeper for Nafta 1903 in Slovenia.

== Club career ==
Born in Slovenj Gradec, Jahič came through the youth academy of Rudar Velenje. He moved to Greece at the age of 18 by signing with Panionios. Jahič was included in their first team squad for the 2005–06 season, but failed to make any appearance.

On 4 August 2006, Jahič was transferred to Partizan, penning a four-year deal. He was one of 12 players to join the club during that transfer window. Mainly a backup to veteran Ivica Kralj, Jahič made five league and two UEFA Cup appearances during the 2006–07 season. He eventually left the club after the first year of his contract.

After leaving Serbia, Jahič returned to Slovenia by joining his former club Rudar Velenje. He spent the following four seasons there, making 52 league appearances for the team.

In the summer of 2011, Jahič moved abroad for the second time by signing with Hungarian side Zalaegerszeg. He made 53 league appearances for the club, before moving to Kaposvár in the 2014 winter transfer window. After six months without a club, Jahič signed an 18-month contract with Dunaújváros in January 2015.

== International career ==
Jahič represented his country at under-17, under-19 and under-21 level.
