= Bence Zámbó =

Hungarian footballer

Personal information
- Full name: Bence Zámbó
- Date of birth: 17 August 1989 (age 37)
- Place of birth: Celldömölk, Hungary
- Height: 1.75 m (5 ft 9 in)
- Position: Defender

Team information
- Current team: Ajka
- Number: 11

Youth career
- 2003–2008: Győr

Senior career*
Years	Team	Apps	(Gls)
2007–2013	Győr	11	(0)
2007–2012	→ Győr II	41	(0)
2010	→ Diósgyőr (loan)	5	(0)
2010–2011	→ MTK Budapest (loan)	1	(0)
2012–2013	→ Kaposvár (loan)	18	(2)
2013–2014	Kaposvár	12	(0)
2014	Tatabánya	12	(0)
2014–2016	Ajka	50	(1)
2016–2019	Csorna	38	(3)
2018	→ Ménfőcsanak (loan)	13	(1)
2019–2021	Lipót	49	(3)
2021–	Csorna	12	(0)

International career
2006–2009	Hungary U-20	26	(2)
- * Club domestic league appearances and goals as of 7 February 2022

Bence Zámbó (born 17 August 1989, in Celldömölk) is a Hungarian football player who currently plays for FC Ajka.

== Club career ==
Zámbó began his career in the youth from Győri ETO FC and was promoted to first team in July 2008. He played his first senior game on 23 August 2008 against Kaposvár and is the captain of the reserves Győri ETO FC II.

== International career ==
Zámbó was capped 26 times and scored two goals for the Hungary U-20 team

== Honours ==
- FIFA U-20 World Cup:
  - Third place: 2009
