= Adrian Mărkuș =

Romanian footballer

Personal information
- Full name: Adrian Alexandru Mărkuș
- Date of birth: 4 October 1992 (age 34)
- Place of birth: Oțelu Roșu, Romania
- Height: 1.78 m (5 ft 10 in)
- Position: Forward

Youth career
- 2008–2010: Liberty Salonta
- 2009–2010: → UTA Arad (loan)

Senior career*
Years	Team	Apps	(Gls)
2010–2013	Bihor Oradea	60	(29)
2013	Kaposvár	13	(3)
2014	Gaz Metan Mediaș	7	(0)
2014	Viitorul Constanța	4	(0)
2015	Olimpia Satu Mare	10	(3)
2015	Metropolitan Police	?	(?)
2016	Olimpia Satu Mare	16	(9)
2016–2017	Haringey Borough	?	(?)
Total		110	(44)

International career^{‡}
2010–2011	Romania U-19	10	(12)
2013	Romania U-21	2	(2)
- * Club domestic league appearances and goals as of 17 January 2016 ‡ National team caps and goals as of 10 August 2016

Adrian Alexandru Mărkuș (born 4 October 1992, in Oțelu Roșu) is a Romanian footballer who plays as a forward.

== Club statistics ==
Club	Season	League		Cup		League Cup		Europe		Total	
Club	Season	Apps	Goals	Apps	Goals	Apps	Goals	Apps	Goals	Apps	Goals
Bihor Oradea
Bihor Oradea	2010–11	23	12	0	0	0	0	0	0	23	12
Bihor Oradea	2011–12	15	6	0	0	0	0	0	0	15	6
Bihor Oradea	2012–13	22	11	0	0	0	0	0	0	22	11
Bihor Oradea	Total	60	29	0	0	0	0	0	0	60	29
Kaposvár
Kaposvár	2012–13	13	3	1	0	1	1	0	0	15	5
Kaposvár	Total	13	3	1	0	1	2	0	0	15	5
Career Total		73	32	1	0	1	2	0	0	75	34

Updated to games played as of 8 December 2013.
