= NK Mladost Prelog =

Croatian football club

- Full name: Nogometni klub Mladost Prelog
- Founded: 1920
- Ground: Stadion Mladosti
- Capacity: 1,500
- Chairman: Ivica Radiković
- Manager: Zoran Kraljić
- League: Premier League of Međimurje County
- 2012–13: 13th

NK Mladost Prelog is a football club based in the town of Prelog, Croatia.

== Honours ==
(Croatia) Treća HNL – South:

- Winners (1): 2001–02
