= Bojan Vručina =

Croatian footballer (born 1984)

Personal information
- Date of birth: 8 November 1984 (age 41)
- Place of birth: Varaždin, SFR Yugoslavia
- Height: 1.82 m (6 ft 0 in)
- Position: Forward

Team information
- Current team: Međimurec DP

Youth career
- 1990–1992: Podravina
- 1992–1996: Varteks
- 1996–1997: Podravina
- 1997–2002: Varteks
- 2002–2004: Podravina

Senior career*
Years	Team	Apps	(Gls)
2004–2010	Slaven Belupo	149	(46)
2008	→ MSV Duisburg (loan)	8	(0)
2010	Hapoel Tel Aviv	10	(1)
2010–2011	Panserraikos	13	(3)
2011–2012	Slaven Belupo	2	(0)
2012–2013	Kaposvár	30	(3)
2014–2016	Shkëndija	56	(30)
2016	Trikala	14	(3)
2016–2017	Rudar Velenje	31	(4)
2017–2018	Shabab Al-Ordon		
2018–2019	SV Wildon	41	(24)
2019–2020	Borac Imbriovec		
2020–2022	Zadrugar Hrastovsko		
2022	Sc St.Margarethen/Raab	12	(10)
2022	Drava-Ajax		
2022–	Međimurec DP		

International career
2004	Croatia U20	1	(0)
2006	Croatia U21	5	(1)
- * Club domestic league appearances and goals as of 21 January 2023

Bojan Vručina (born 8 November 1984) is a Croatian professional footballer who plays as a forward for Međimurec Dunjkovec-Pretetinec.

== Club career ==
After youth years with Varteks and Podravina Ludbreg, Vručina started his professional career at Slaven Belupo in the second half of the 2003–04 season. In the 2006–07 season, he appeared in 32 of the club's 33 games in the Croatian league, scoring eleven goals. In the summer of 2007, he also appeared in all of the club's four UEFA Cup qualifiers, scoring three goals.

In the second half of the 2007–08 season, Vručina was signed by German Bundesliga side MSV Duisburg on loan until the end of the season. He made his Bundesliga debut on 2 February 2008 as a late substitute in their 3–3 draw against Borussia Dortmund. However, he failed to find his place as a regular at the club and only appeared in eight league games, seven of them as a substitute. Following Duisburg's relegation to the 2. Bundesliga, he returned to Slaven Belupo.

In the summer of 2008, he helped Slaven Belupo reach the first round of the UEFA Cup for the first time in the club's history, scoring five goals in their four qualifiers for the competition. However, they failed to reach the group stage after losing to CSKA Moscow in the first round. Vručina nevertheless continued to perform well for the club in the Croatian league and he was their top goalscorer with 14 goals.

On 28 January 2010, Vručina signed a three-and-a-half-year contract with Hapoel Tel Aviv and was a part of the historic win of the Israeli State Cup and Ligat Ha'Al (the Israeli Premier League)

In August 2010, he signed a one-year contract with Super League Greece club Panserraikos After playing three official matches with the club, he suffered a knee injury and on 28 September it was announced that he would need a knee surgery that would keep him out of action for about five months.

Vručina and Panserraikos agreed termination of his contract in December 2011 and in March 2012 he joined his former club Slaven Belupo as a free agent.

On 25 June 2019, Vručina signed a contract with Croatian fifth division club Borac Imbriovec. He also had two spells in the Austrian lower leagues.

== International career ==
In 2006, Vručina won five international caps for the Croatian national under-21 team, scoring his only goal in a friendly match against Bosnia and Herzegovina on 1 August 2006.

In late March 2009, he received his first call-up for Croatia's senior national team after being named to their squad for the 2010 FIFA World Cup qualifier against Andorra on 1 April 2009.
