= Lucas Rocha (footballer, born 1991) =

Brazilian footballer

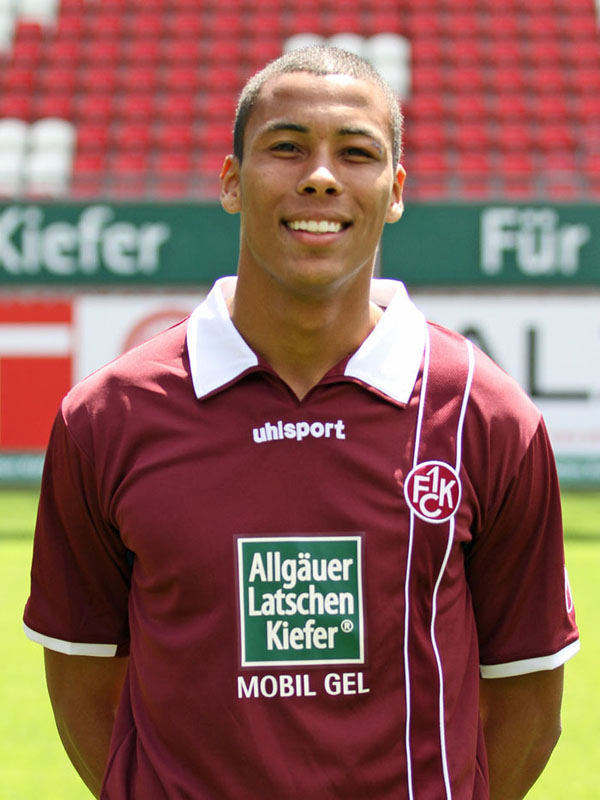
- Lucas with 1. FC Kaiserslautern

Personal information
- Full name: Lucas dos Santos Rocha da Silva
- Date of birth: 15 July 1991 (age 35)
- Place of birth: São Paulo, Brasil
- Height: 1.94 m (6 ft 4 in)
- Position: Defender

Team information
- Current team: Amazonas

Youth career
- 2010: Portuguesa

Senior career*
Years	Team	Apps	(Gls)
2008–2010	Portuguesa		
2010–2012	Bayer Leverkusen	0	(0)
2010	→ Portuguesa (loan)		
2011–2012	→ Kaiserslautern (loan)	0	(0)
2012–2013	Vasas	20	(2)
2013–2014	Kaposvár	6	(1)
2014–2016	Boavista	8	(0)
2015–2016	→ Atlético CP (loan)	12	(0)
2017	Rio Branco-AC	3	(1)
2017–2018	Lusitanos Saint-Maur	14	(2)
2019	CA Juventus	10	(3)
2019–2020	Quang Nam	17	(1)
2021	CA Juventus	11	(1)
2021	Caxias-RS	7	(0)
2021–2022	Audax-RJ	10	(0)
2022	Amazonas	16	(2)
2023	Patrocinense	1	(0)
2024–	Comercial	5	(0)
- * Club domestic league appearances and goals as of 7 February 2024

Lucas dos Santos Rocha da Silva (born 15 July 1991), commonly known as Lucas Rocha or just Lucão, is a Brazilian professional footballer who plays as a defender for Brazilian club Comercial.

== Career ==
A youth graduate from Portuguesa, his performances at early age led to a move abroad, joining Bayer Leverkusen on 17 July 2010, signing a two-year deal, while finishing the season at Portuguesa. In January 2011, he moved on a loan deal to 1. FC Kaiserslautern, but did not make an appearance.

A free agent, he joined Vasas on 4 September 2012, playing 19 games as starter, scoring once. A year later, he moved, this time to Kaposvár in the Hungarian league. On 27 June 2014, Lucas Rocha moved to his fourth club in same number of years, joining Boavista in Portugal.
