= Pomezeu =

- Commune
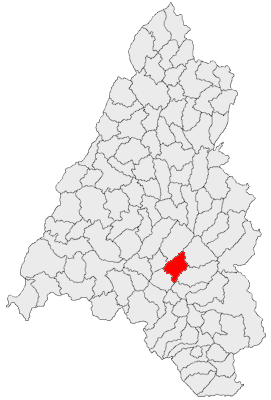
- Location in Bihor County

- Location in Romania
- Coordinates: 46°47′N 22°17′E
- Country: Romania
- County: Bihor
- Population (2021-12-01): 2,389
- Time zone: EET/EEST (UTC+2/+3)
- Vehicle reg.: BH

Pomezeu (Hungarian: Kispapmező) is a commune in Bihor County, Crișana, Romania with a population of 2,922 people. It is composed of eight villages: Câmpani de Pomezeu (Nagypapmező), Coșdeni (Kosgyán), Hidiș (Hegyes), Lacu Sărat, Pomezeu, Sitani (Szitány), Spinuș de Pomezeu (Tősfalva), and Vălani de Pomezeu (Papmezővalány).

== Natives ==
- Ioan Judea (1933–2022), army officer and former member of the Securitate
