= 2013–14 Kecskeméti TE season =

Kecskeméti TE
2013–14 season
- Chairman: (Hungary) Pál Rózsa (Hungary) János Versegi
- Manager: (Hungary) Balázs Bekő
- NB 1: 10th
- Hungarian Cup: Round of 16
- Hungarian League Cup: Round of 16
- Top goalscorer: League: (Montenegro) Vladan Savić (6); All: (Hungary) Zsolt Balázs (8)
- Highest home attendance: 4,462 vs Ferencváros (23 March 2014)
- Lowest home attendance: 200 vs Békéscsaba (19 November 2013)
Home colours	Away colours

The 2013–14 season will be Kecskeméti TE's 6th competitive season, 6th consecutive season in the OTP Bank Liga and 102nd year in existence as a football club.

== First team squad ==
Note: Flags indicate national team as defined under FIFA eligibility rules; some limited exceptions apply. Players may hold more than one non-FIFA nationality.

No.	Pos.	Nation	Player
1	GK	MNE	Vukašin Poleksić (loan from Debrecen)
4	DF	HUN	Róbert Varga
5	FW	MNE	Darko Pavićević
7	FW	HUN	Zsolt Balázs
8	MF	HUN	Zsolt Patvaros
9	FW	HUN	András Simon (loan from Győr)
10	MF	MNE	Vladan Savić
11	MF	BRA	Eliomar (loan from Partizan)
12	GK	HUN	Viktor Németh
13	DF	HUN	Krisztián Póti
14	MF	MNE	Marko Vukasović
15	DF	HUN	Attila Gyagya
16	FW	HUN	Dániel Szalai

No.	Pos.	Nation	Player
19	FW	HUN	Gábor Gréczi
20	FW	HUN	Márk Szécsi (loan from Debrecen)
26	MF	HUN	Dárius Csillag
29	MF	HUN	Patrik Nagy
30	MF	TOG	Henri Eninful
31	DF	SRB	Dejan Karan
77	FW	HUN	László Pekár
91	FW	SEN	Bebeto
92	DF	HUN	András Farkas
95	GK	HUN	Konrád Verebélyi

== Transfers ==
=== Summer ===
In: Note: Flags indicate national team as defined under FIFA eligibility rules; some limited exceptions apply. Players may hold more than one non-FIFA nationality.

No.	Pos.	Nation	Player
5	MF	HUN	István Farkas (loan return from Cegléd)
9	FW	GUI	Ousmane Barry (from (Estonia) Tartu)
11	MF	BRA	Eliomar (loan from (Serbia) Partizan)
12	GK	HUN	Viktor Németh (from Budaörs)
15	DF	HUN	Attila Gyagya (loan return from Szolnok)
20	FW	BEN	Sidoine Oussou (loan from (Norway) Vålerenga)
21	DF	HUN	Martin Ludasi (from Kecskemét II)
26	MF	HUN	Dárius Csillag (from Honvéd Academy)
30	MF	MNE	Boris Bulajić (from (Montenegro) Čelik Nikšić)
31	DF	SRB	Dejan Karan (from (Serbia) Vojvodina)
33	GK	HUN	Róbert Csala (from Kecskemét Academy)
37	MF	HUN	Dániel Nagy (from Kecskemét II)
83	GK	HUN	Csaba Borszéki (loan return from Vác)
88	DF	HUN	Viktor Tölgyesi (loan return from Gyirmót)
89	FW	HUN	Béni Faragó (from Kecskemét Academy)
92	DF	HUN	András Farkas (loan return from Baja)
95	GK	HUN	Konrád Verebélyi (from Honvéd Academy)
—	MF	SRB	Milan Cokić (loan return from Baja)

Out: Note: Flags indicate national team as defined under FIFA eligibility rules; some limited exceptions apply. Players may hold more than one non-FIFA nationality.

No.	Pos.	Nation	Player
5	MF	HUN	István Farkas (to Cegléd)
9	FW	HUN	Ádám Kovács (loan return to Nyíregyháza)
11	MF	HUN	Márkó Sós (to Gyirmót)
18	MF	HUN	Attila Hullám (to Paks)
20	MF	GEO	Givi Ioseliani (to (Georgia (country)) Bolnisi)
21	FW	SLV	Rafael Burgos (loan return to (Austria) Ried)
22	DF	HUN	Dávid Mohl (to Pécs)
26	MF	HUN	Lajos Bertus (to Puskás)
27	MF	CMR	Mbengono Yannick (to (Thailand) Chainat)
28	DF	HUN	Tamás Vaskó (loan return to Videoton)
30	FW	NGA	Eugène Salami (loan return to Debrecen)
33	GK	HUN	Gábor Ikotin
83	GK	HUN	Csaba Borszéki
88	DF	HUN	Viktor Tölgyesi (loan to Békéscsaba)
92	MF	ARG	Edgardo Díaz
—	MF	SRB	Milan Cokić

=== Winter ===
In: Note: Flags indicate national team as defined under FIFA eligibility rules; some limited exceptions apply. Players may hold more than one non-FIFA nationality.

No.	Pos.	Nation	Player
1	GK	MNE	Vukašin Poleksić (loan from Debrecen)
5	FW	MNE	Darko Pavićević (from Zalaegerszeg)
9	FW	HUN	András Simon (loan from Győr)
16	FW	HUN	Dániel Szalai (from Kecskemét U-19)
20	FW	HUN	Márk Szécsi (loan from Debrecen)
22	DF	HUN	Mihály Bene (from Kecskemét U-19)
30	MF	TOG	Henri Eninful (loan from Újpest)
40	MF	HUN	András Burics (loan from Debrecen II)
60	MF	CIV	Brahima Touré (from (Switzerland) Lugano)
70	FW	HUN	Péter Csima (from Kecskemét U-19)
91	FW	SEN	Bebeto (loan from (Switzerland) Lugano)

Out:1 Note: Flags indicate national team as defined under FIFA eligibility rules; some limited exceptions apply. Players may hold more than one non-FIFA nationality.

No.	Pos.	Nation	Player
2	DF	HUN	Balázs Koszó (to Békéscsaba)
3	DF	HUN	József Mogyorósi (to Ajka)
9	FW	GUI	Ousmane Barry (to (Greece) Panachaiki)
17	MF	CGO	Christian Ebala
20	FW	BEN	Sidoine Oussou (loan return to (Norway) Vålerenga)
30	MF	MNE	Boris Bulajić
81	FW	HUN	Péter Rajczi (to Mezőkövesd)
99	GK	HUN	Botond Antal (to Kaposvár)

- List of Hungarian football transfers summer 2013
- List of Hungarian football transfers winter 2013–14

== Statistics ==
=== Appearances and goals ===
Last updated on 1 June 2014.

No.	Pos	Nat	Player	Total		OTP Bank Liga		Hungarian Cup		League Cup	
No.	Pos	Nat	Player	Apps	Goals	Apps	Goals	Apps	Goals	Apps	Goals
1	GK	(Montenegro) MNE	Vukašin Poleksić	11	-12	10	-7	0	0	1	-5
4	DF	(Hungary) HUN	Róbert Varga	24	1	18	1	1	0	5	0
5	FW	(Montenegro) MNE	Darko Pavićević	11	1	10	1	0	0	1	0
7	FW	(Hungary) HUN	Zsolt Balázs	30	8	23	3	2	0	5	5
8	MF	(Hungary) HUN	Zsolt Patvaros	30	0	25	0	2	0	3	0
9	FW	(Hungary) HUN	András Simon	8	1	6	1	0	0	2	0
10	MF	(Montenegro) MNE	Vladan Savić	25	6	23	6	1	0	1	0
11	MF	(Brazil) BRA	Eliomar	16	3	8	2	3	0	5	1
12	GK	(Hungary) HUN	Viktor Németh	11	-29	8	-21	0	0	3	-8
13	DF	(Hungary) HUN	Krisztián Póti	29	2	24	1	1	0	4	1
14	MF	(Montenegro) MNE	Marko Vukasović	31	2	26	1	2	0	3	1
15	DF	(Hungary) HUN	Attila Gyagya	22	1	15	1	2	0	5	0
16	MF	(Hungary) HUN	Dániel Szalai	4	0	3	0	0	0	1	0
19	FW	(Hungary) HUN	Gábor Gréczi	26	4	20	4	2	0	4	0
20	FW	(Hungary) HUN	Márk Szécsi	12	1	12	1	0	0	0	0
23	DF	(Hungary) HUN	Gyula Forró	29	2	26	2	0	0	3	0
26	MF	(Hungary) HUN	Dárius Csillag	8	0	2	0	1	0	5	0
29	MF	(Hungary) HUN	Patrik Nagy	26	2	17	1	3	0	6	1
30	MF	(Togo) TOG	Henri Eninful	12	1	12	1	0	0	0	0
31	DF	(Serbia) SRB	Dejan Karan	32	0	27	0	3	0	2	0
40	MF	(Hungary) HUN	András Burics	2	0	1	0	0	0	1	0
70	MF	(Hungary) HUN	Péter Csima	6	0	1	0	1	0	4	0
77	FW	(Hungary) HUN	László Pekár	30	4	22	0	3	0	5	4
91	FW	(Senegal) SEN	Bebeto	10	2	10	2	0	0	0	0
92	DF	(Hungary) HUN	András Farkas	18	0	9	0	3	0	6	0
95	GK	(Hungary) HUN	Konrád Verebélyi	4	-9	1	-2	1	-1	2	-6
Youth players:
17	MF	(Hungary) HUN	Miklós Kitl	1	0	0	0	0	0	1	0
21	MF	(Hungary) HUN	Martin Ludasi	1	0	0	0	0	0	1	0
22	DF	(Hungary) HUN	Mihály Bene	4	0	0	0	1	0	3	0
37	MF	(Hungary) HUN	Dániel Nagy	1	0	0	0	0	0	1	0
39	DF	(Hungary) HUN	Tamás Sutus-Juhász	1	0	0	0	0	0	1	0
40	DF	(Hungary) HUN	Tamás Szabó	2	0	0	0	0	0	2	0
50	DF	(Hungary) HUN	Gábor Sztehlik	2	0	0	0	0	0	2	0
60	DF	(Hungary) HUN	Balázs Virágh	1	0	0	0	0	0	1	0
60	MF	(Ivory Coast) CIV	Brahima Touré	1	0	0	0	0	0	1	0
69	FW	(Hungary) HUN	Martin Vékes	3	0	0	0	1	0	2	0
89	FW	(Hungary) HUN	Béni Faragó	2	0	0	0	0	0	2	0
96	FW	(Hungary) HUN	Gábor Filyó	1	0	0	0	0	0	1	0
Players no longer at the club:
2	DF	(Hungary) HUN	Balázs Koszó	3	1	1	1	0	0	2	0
3	DF	(Hungary) HUN	József Mogyorósi	17	1	15	1	1	0	1	0
9	FW	(Guinea) GUI	Ousmane Barry	14	2	10	1	1	0	3	1
17	MF	(Republic of the Congo) CGO	Christian Ebala	4	0	1	0	1	0	2	0
20	FW	(Benin) BEN	Sidoine Oussou	4	1	2	1	0	0	2	0
30	MF	(Montenegro) MNE	Boris Bulajić	16	1	9	1	2	0	5	0
81	FW	(Hungary) HUN	Péter Rajczi	14	2	12	2	2	0	0	0
99	GK	(Hungary) HUN	Botond Antal	15	-28	11	-21	2	-3	2	-4

=== Top scorers ===
Includes all competitive matches. The list is sorted by shirt number when total goals are equal.

Last updated on 1 June 2014

Position	Nation	Number	Name	OTP Bank Liga	Hungarian Cup	League Cup	Total
1	(Hungary)	7	Zsolt Balázs	3	0	5	8
2	(Montenegro)	10	Vladan Savić	6	0	0	6
3	(Hungary)	19	Gábor Gréczi	4	0	0	4
4	(Hungary)	77	László Pekár	0	0	4	4
5	(Brazil)	11	Eliomar	2	0	1	3
6	(Hungary)	81	Péter Rajczi	2	0	0	2
7	(Hungary)	23	Gyula Forró	2	0	0	2
8	(Senegal)	91	Bebeto	2	0	0	2
9	(Hungary)	29	Patrik Nagy	1	0	1	2
10	(Hungary)	13	Krisztián Póti	1	0	1	2
11	(Montenegro)	14	Marko Vukasović	1	0	1	2
12	(Guinea)	9	Ousmane Barry	1	0	1	2
13	(Montenegro)	30	Boris Bulajić	1	0	0	1
14	(Benin)	20	Sidoine Oussou	1	0	0	1
15	(Hungary)	3	József Mogyorósi	1	0	0	1
16	(Hungary)	2	Balázs Koszó	1	0	0	1
17	(Hungary)	15	Attila Gyagya	1	0	0	1
18	(Hungary)	4	Róbert Varga	1	0	0	1
19	(Togo)	30	Henri Eninful	1	0	0	1
20	(Hungary)	20	Márk Szécsi	1	0	0	1
21	(Hungary)	9	András Simon	1	0	0	1
22	(Hungary)	5	Darko Pavićević	1	0	0	1
/	/	/	Own Goals	1	0	0	1
			TOTALS	38	0	12	50

=== Disciplinary record ===
Includes all competitive matches. Players with 1 card or more included only.

Last updated on 1 June 2014

Position	Nation	Number	Name	OTP Bank Liga		Hungarian Cup		League Cup		Total (Hu Total)	
Position	Nation	Number	Name	Booked	Sent off (straight red)	Booked	Sent off (straight red)	Booked	Sent off (straight red)	Booked	Sent off (straight red)
DF	(Hungary)	2	Balázs Koszó	0	0	0	0	1	0	1 (0)	0 (0)
DF	(Hungary)	3	József Mogyorósi	3	0	0	0	0	0	3 (3)	0 (0)
DF	(Hungary)	4	Róbert Varga	3	0	0	0	1	0	4 (3)	0 (0)
FW	(Montenegro)	5	Darko Pavićević	2	0	0	0	0	0	2 (2)	0 (0)
FW	(Hungary)	7	Zsolt Balázs	3	0	0	0	0	0	3 (3)	0 (0)
MF	(Hungary)	8	Zsolt Patvaros	3	2	0	0	0	0	3 (3)	2 (2)
FW	(Guinea)	9	Ousmane Barry	1	0	0	0	0	0	1 (1)	0 (0)
MF	(Montenegro)	10	Vladan Savić	5	0	0	0	0	0	5 (5)	0 (0)
DF	(Hungary)	13	Krisztián Póti	6	1	0	0	1	0	7 (6)	1 (1)
MF	(Montenegro)	14	Marko Vukasović	7	1	2	0	0	0	9 (7)	1 (1)
DF	(Hungary)	15	Attila Gyagya	1	0	0	0	2	0	3 (1)	0 (0)
MF	(Hungary)	16	Dániel Szalai	1	0	0	0	0	0	1 (1)	0 (0)
MF	(Republic of the Congo)	17	Christian Ebala	0	0	0	0	1	0	1 (0)	0 (0)
FW	(Hungary)	19	Gábor Gréczi	3	0	1	0	1	0	5 (3)	0 (0)
FW	(Hungary)	20	Márk Szécsi	2	0	0	0	0	0	2 (2)	0 (0)
DF	(Hungary)	23	Gyula Forró	6	1	0	0	0	0	6 (6)	1 (1)
MF	(Hungary)	29	Patrik Nagy	2	0	0	0	1	0	3 (2)	0 (0)
MF	(Montenegro)	30	Boris Bulajić	1	0	0	0	1	0	2 (1)	0 (0)
MF	(Togo)	30	Henri Eninful	3	0	0	0	0	0	3 (3)	0 (0)
DF	(Serbia)	31	Dejan Karan	8	0	0	0	1	0	9 (8)	0 (0)
DF	(Hungary)	39	Tamás Sutus-Juhász	0	0	0	0	1	0	1 (0)	0 (0)
DF	(Hungary)	60	Balázs Virágh	0	0	0	0	1	0	1 (0)	0 (0)
MF	(Ivory Coast)	60	Brahima Touré	0	0	0	0	1	0	1 (0)	0 (0)
FW	(Hungary)	81	Péter Rajczi	3	0	0	0	0	0	3 (3)	0 (0)
FW	(Senegal)	91	Bebeto	2	0	0	0	0	0	2 (2)	0 (0)
DF	(Hungary)	92	András Farkas	2	1	0	0	1	0	3 (2)	1 (1)
GK	(Hungary)	99	Botond Antal	2	0	1	0	0	0	3 (2)	0 (0)
			TOTALS	71	6	4	0	14	0	87 (71)	6 (6)

=== Overall ===
Games played	41 (30 OTP Bank Liga, 3 Hungarian Cup and 8 Hungarian League Cup)
Games won	12 (9 OTP Bank Liga, 0 Hungarian Cup and 3 Hungarian League Cup)
Games drawn	11 (9 OTP Bank Liga, 1 Hungarian Cup and 1 Hungarian League Cup)
Games lost	18 (12 OTP Bank Liga, 2 Hungarian Cup and 4 Hungarian League Cup)
Goals scored	50
Goals conceded	78
Goal difference	-28
Yellow cards	87
Red cards	6
Worst discipline	(Montenegro) Marko Vukasović (9 (yellow card) , 1 (red card) )
Best result	3–0 (H) v MTK – OTP Bank Liga – 19-04-2014
Worst result	0–5 (A) v Debrecen – OTP Bank Liga – 26-04-2014
Worst result	1–6 (A) v Újpest – OTP Bank Liga – 17-05-2014
Most appearances	(Serbia) Dejan Karan (32 appearances)
Top scorer	(Hungary) Zsolt Balázs (8 goals)
Points	47/123 (38.21%)

Last updated: 1 June 2014

== Nemzeti Bajnokság I ==
=== Matches ===
28 July 2013 1	Kecskemét	3–1	Honvéd	Kecskemét, Bács-Kiskun County
18:30 CEST	Bulajić 7'; Eliomar 66'; Oussou 90+2'	(Report)	Vécsei 90+1'	Stadium: Széktói Stadion; Attendance: 2,314; Referee: (Hungary) Péter Solymosi

3 August 2013 2	Kaposvár	1–2	Kecskemét	Kaposvár, Somogy County
19:00 CEST	Petrache 21'	(Report)	Mogyorósi 6'; Forró 33'	Stadium: Stadion Kaposvár Rákóczi; Attendance: 2,000; Referee: (Hungary) József Erdős

10 August 2013 3	Kecskemét	2–6	Mezőkövesd	Kecskemét, Bács-Kiskun County
16:30 CEST	Rajczi 42' (pen.); Koszó 55'	(Report)	Szalai 13'; Melczer 21' (pen.); Balajti 26'; Bognár 47'; Menougong 70'; Olasz 88'	Stadium: Széktói Stadion; Attendance: 2,500; Referee: (Hungary) Ádám Farkas

17 August 2013 4	Diósgyőr	1–1	Kecskemét	Miskolc, Borsod-Abaúj-Zemplén County
16:30 CEST	Barczi 15'	(Report)	Rajczi 73'	Stadium: DVTK Stadion; Attendance: 3,351; Referee: (Hungary) Sándor Andó-Szabó

23 August 2013 5	Kecskemét	1–1	Szombathely	Kecskemét, Bács-Kiskun County
19:00 CEST	Forró 26'	(Report)	Fehér 49'	Stadium: Széktói Stadion; Attendance: 2,048; Referee: (Hungary) Zsolt Szabó

31 August 2013 6	Ferencváros	1–0	Kecskemét	Budapest, Pest County
19:00 CEST	Diallo 3'	(Report)		Stadium: Ferenc Puskás Stadium; Attendance: 6,210; Referee: (Hungary) Sándor Andó-Szabó

14 September 2013 7	Kecskemét	2–5	Pécs	Kecskemét, Bács-Kiskun County
16:00 CEST	Savić 9'; Eliomar 22' (pen.)	(Report)	Uzoma 42'; Romić 45'; Mohl 50'; Márkvárt 82'; Pölöskey 85'	Stadium: Széktói Stadion; Attendance: 600; Referee: (Hungary) Dániel Becséri

21 September 2013 8	Videoton	1–0	Kecskemét	Székesfehérvár, Fejér County
20:00 CEST	Zé Luís 79'	(Report)		Stadium: Sóstói Stadion; Attendance: 2,550; Referee: (Hungary) Péter Solymosi

28 September 2013 9	Kecskemét	1–0	Győr	Kecskemét, Bács-Kiskun County
20:00 CEST	Savić 55'	(Report)		Stadium: Széktói Stadion; Attendance: 1,326; Referee: (Hungary) István Vad

5 October 2013 10	MTK	2–2	Kecskemét	Budapest, Pest County
18:00 CEST	Fejes 20'; Batik 84'	(Report)	Savić 63'; Nagy 73'	Stadium: Hidegkuti Nándor Stadium; Attendance: 1,000; Referee: (Hungary) Zsolt Szabó

19 October 2013 11	Kecskemét	0–3	Debrecen	Kecskemét, Bács-Kiskun County
16:00 CEST		(Report)	Kulcsár 32'; Bouadla 45'; Korhut 80'	Stadium: Széktói Stadion; Attendance: 1,412; Referee: (Hungary) Sándor Andó-Szabó

26 October 2013 12	Kecskemét	3–1	Paks	Kecskemét, Bács-Kiskun County
18:00 CEST	Gyagya 26'; Póti 33'; Vukasović 59'	(Report)	Nagy 7'	Stadium: Széktói Stadion; Attendance: 1,323; Referee: (Hungary) Ádám Németh

1 November 2013 13	Pápa	3–1	Kecskemét	Pápa, Veszprém County
19:00 CET	Arsić 22', 52'; Kenesei 49'	(Report)	Balázs 37'	Stadium: Stadion Várkerti; Attendance: 1,500; Referee: (Hungary) Ádám Farkas

10 November 2013 14	Kecskemét	1–1	Újpest	Kecskemét, Bács-Kiskun County
18:30 CET	Balázs 9'	(Report)	Vukasović 3' (o.g.)	Stadium: Széktói Stadion; Attendance: 1,852; Referee: (Hungary) Tamás Bognár

22 November 2013 15	Puskás	2–2	Kecskemét	Székesfehérvár, Fejér County
19:00 CET	Haraszti 16'; Gallardo 46'	(Report)	Gréczi 75'; Barry 80'	Stadium: Sóstói Stadion; Attendance: 100; Referee: (Hungary) Péter Solymosi

29 November 2013 16	Honvéd	1–1	Kecskemét	Budapest, Pest County
19:00 CET	Holender 90+5'	(Report)	Gréczi 77'	Stadium: Bozsik Stadion; Attendance: 1,000; Referee: (Hungary) Dániel Becséri

7 December 2013 17	Kecskemét	2–1	Kaposvár	Kecskemét, Bács-Kiskun County
16:00 CET	Kovács 1' (o.g.); Gréczi 21'	(Report)	Thian 38'	Stadium: Széktói Stadion; Attendance: 831; Referee: (Hungary) Dániel Becséri

1 March 2014 18	Mezőkövesd	0–1	Kecskemét	Mezőkövesd, Borsod-Abaúj-Zemplén County
20:00 CET		(Report)	Bebeto 70'	Stadium: Mezőkövesdi Városi Stadion; Attendance: 2,000; Referee: (Hungary) Zoltán Iványi

8 March 2014 19	Kecskemét	1–1	Diósgyőr	Kecskemét, Bács-Kiskun County
14:00 CET	Varga 63'	(Report)	Futács 16' (pen.)	Stadium: Széktói Stadion; Attendance: 2,382; Referee: (Hungary) Ádám Németh

14 March 2014 20	Szombathely	1–0	Kecskemét	Szombathely, Vas County
17:00 CET	Gyurján 55'	(Report)		Stadium: Rohonci Street Stadium; Attendance: 2,320; Referee: (Hungary) Dániel Becséri

23 March 2014 21	Kecskemét	0–0	Ferencváros	Kecskemét, Bács-Kiskun County
18:30 CET		(Report)		Stadium: Széktói Stadion; Attendance: 4,462; Referee: (Hungary) Zoltán Iványi

29 March 2014 22	Pécs	0–0	Kecskemét	Pécs, Baranya County
16:00 CET		(Report)		Stadium: Stadion PMFC; Attendance: 2,000; Referee: (Hungary) István Vad

5 April 2014 23	Kecskemét	3–1	Videoton	Kecskemét, Bács-Kiskun County
18:00 CEST	Eninful 43'; Bebeto 63'; Szécsi 89'	(Report)	Nikolić 65'	Stadium: Széktói Stadion; Attendance: 2,218; Referee: (Hungary) Sándor Andó-Szabó

13 April 2014 24	Győr	2–1	Kecskemét	Győr, Győr-Moson-Sopron County
18:30 CEST	Střeštík 65'; Varga 90+3'	(Report)	Gréczi 9'	Stadium: ETO Park; Attendance: 2,500; Referee: (Hungary) Péter Solymosi

19 April 2014 25	Kecskemét	3–0	MTK	Kecskemét, Bács-Kiskun County
16:00 CEST	Simon 12'; Savić 29'; Pavićević 90+2'	(Report)		Stadium: Széktói Stadion; Attendance: 2,120; Referee: (Hungary) Sándor Andó-Szabó

26 April 2014 26	Debrecen	5–0	Kecskemét	Debrecen, Hajdú-Bihar County
18:00 CEST	Sidibe 28', 37'; Mihelič 75'; Kulcsár 82', 83'	(Report)		Stadium: Stadion Oláh Gábor Út; Attendance: 7,500; Referee: (Hungary) Zoltán Iványi

2 May 2014 27	Paks	2–0	Kecskemét	Paks, Tolna County
19:00 CEST	Könyves 9'; Simon 11'	(Report)		Stadium: Stadion PSE; Attendance: 1,000; Referee: (Hungary) Ádám Farkas

10 May 2014 28	Kecskemét	1–0	Pápa	Kecskemét, Bács-Kiskun County
16:00 CEST	Savić 3'	(Report)		Stadium: Széktói Stadion; Attendance: 1,980; Referee: (Hungary) Dániel Becséri

17 May 2014 29	Újpest	6–1	Kecskemét	Budapest, Pest County
18:00 CEST	Stanisavljević 14'; Gyagya 48' (o.g.); Vasiljević 55' (pen.), 64' (pen.); Tshibuabua 71'; Vukasović 90' (o.g.)	(Report)	Savić 38' (pen.)	Stadium: Szusza Ferenc Stadium; Attendance: 1,375; Referee: (Hungary) Viktor Kassai

31 May 2014 30	Kecskemét	1–2	Puskás	Kecskemét, Bács-Kiskun County
18:00 CEST	Balázs 15'	(Report)	Szakály 34', 83'	Stadium: Széktói Stadion; Attendance: 1,684; Referee: (Hungary) Ádám Farkas

=== Classification ===
Pos	Team	Pld	W	D	L	GF	GA	GD	Pts
8	MTK	30	11	7	12	42	36	+6	40
9	Honvéd	30	10	6	14	37	39	−2	36
10	Kecskemét	30	9	9	12	36	51	−15	36
11	Paks	30	8	10	12	39	42	−3	34
12	Pápa	30	9	6	15	32	50	−18	33

Source: mlsz.hu (in Hungarian)
Rules for classification: 1st points; 2nd overall wins; 3rd goal difference; 4th head-to-head points; 5th head-to-head goal difference; 6th head-to-head away goals scored; 7th fair-play points; 8th drawing of lots

=== Results summary ===
Overall								Home						Away					
Pld	W	D	L	GF	GA	GD	Pts	W	D	L	GF	GA	GD	W	D	L	GF	GA	GD
30	9	9	12	36	51	−15	36	7	4	4	24	23	+1	2	5	8	12	28	−16

Last updated: 1 June 2014.
Source: NB1

=== Results by round ===
Round	1	2	3	4	5	6	7	8	9	10	11	12	13	14	15	16	17	18	19	20	21	22	23	24	25	26	27	28	29	30
Ground	H	A	H	A	H	A	H	A	H	A	H	H	A	H	A	A	H	A	H	A	H	A	H	A	H	A	A	H	A	H
Result	W	W	L	D	D	L	L	L	W	D	L	W	L	D	D	D	W	W	D	L	D	D	W	L	W	L	L	W	L	L
Position	3	3	6	6	7	10	13	13 November 2010	10	9	11	10	11	11	11	10	10	11	11	11	9	10	9	9	9	8	9	10		

Updated to match(es) played on 1 June 2014. Source: Matches
A = Away; H = Home; W = Win; D = Draw; L = Loss

== Hungarian Cup ==
22 October 2013 Round of 32	Puskás	0–0 (a.e.t.) (3–4 p)	Kecskemét	Székesfehérvár, Fejér County
13:30 CEST		(Report)		Stadium: Sóstói Stadion; Attendance: 80; Referee: (Hungary) Gábor Oláh
	Penalties
	(penalty scored) Nikolić; (penalty missed) Haraszti; (penalty scored) Szekeres; (penalty scored) Czvitkovics; (penalty missed) Tischler		(penalty scored) Pekár; (penalty scored) Gyagya; (penalty scored) Balázs; (penalty scored) Vukasović; (penalty missed) Savić

26 November 2013 Round of 16 (1st leg)	Kecskemét	0–3	MTK	Kecskemét, Bács-Kiskun County
17:00 CET		(Report)	Vass 48'; Horváth 63'; Kanta 90+2' (pen.)	Stadium: Széktói Stadion; Attendance: 200; Referee: (Hungary) Viktor Kassai

3 December 2013 Round of 16 (2nd leg)	MTK	1–0 (4–0 agg.)	Kecskemét	Budapest, Pest County
17:30 CET	Kanta 63'	Report		Stadium: Hidegkuti Nándor Stadium; Attendance: 100; Referee: (Hungary) Ádám Németh

== League Cup ==
=== Group stage ===
4 September 2013 1	Békéscsaba	3–3	Kecskemét	Békéscsaba, Békés County
19:00 CEST	Pozsár 2'; Pantović 11', 54'	(Report)	Balázs 25' (pen.), 67' (pen.); Pekár 34'	Stadium: Stadion Kórház utcai Attendance: 300; Referee: (Hungary) Ferenc Karakó

11 September 2013 2	Kecskemét	2–1	Újpest	Kecskemét, Bács-Kiskun County
18:00 CEST	Pekár 47'; Nagy 64'	(Report)	Simon 49'	Stadium: Széktói Stadion; Attendance: 200; Referee: (Hungary) János Takács

9 October 2013 3	Kecskemét	4–2	Szolnok	Kecskemét, Bács-Kiskun County
16:00 CEST	Vukasović 40'; Póti 42'; Balázs 82'; Barry 90+3'	(Report)	Szepessy 59'; Máté 73'	Stadium: Széktói Stadion; Attendance: 200; Referee: (Hungary) László Lovas

16 October 2013 4	Szolnok	5–2	Kecskemét	Szolnok, Jász-Nagykun-Szolnok County
17:00 CEST	Magos 3'; Papizsanszkij 43'; Bohner 61'; Antal 66' (pen.), 90+2'	(Report)	Balázs 17' (pen.); Eliomar 33'	Stadium: Tiszaligeti Stadion; Attendance: 100; Referee: (Hungary) János Takács

13 November 2013 5	Újpest	1–2	Kecskemét	Budapest, Pest County
18:00 CET	Horváth 37'	(Report)	Pekár 5', 84' (pen.)	Stadium: Szusza Ferenc Stadium; Attendance: 200; Referee: (Hungary) László Varga

19 November 2013 6	Kecskemét	0–2	Békéscsaba	Kecskemét, Bács-Kiskun County
14:00 CET		(Report)	Tölgyesi 7'; Pozsár 36'	Stadium: Széktói Stadion; Attendance: 200; Referee: (Hungary) Gyöngyi Gaál

==== Classification ====
Pos	Team	Pld	W	D	L	GF	GA	GD	Pts	Qualification
1	Szolnok	6	3	1	2	15	10	+5	10	Advance to knockout phase
2	Kecskemét	6	3	1	2	13	14	−1	10	Advance to knockout phase
3	Újpest	6	1	3	2	9	9	0	6	
4	Békéscsaba	6	1	3	2	8	12	−4	6	

Rules for classification: 1) points; 2) goal difference; 3) number of goals scored.

=== Knockout phase ===
22 February 2013 Round of 16 (1st leg)	Kecskemét	1–5	Pápa	Kecskemét, Bács-Kiskun County
13:00 CET	Balázs 76'	(Report)	Kenesei 5' (pen.), 40'; Tóth 34', 47'; Orosz 78'	Stadium: Széktói Stadion; Attendance: 200; Referee: (Hungary) János Takács

4 March 2014 Round of 16 (2nd leg)	Pápa	4–0 (9–1 agg.)	Kecskemét	Pápa, Veszprém County
16:00 CET	Tóth 12'; Griffiths 39'; Kulcsár 44', 84'	(Report)		Stadium: Stadion Várkerti; Attendance: 200; Referee: (Hungary) Balázs Böcskei

== Preseason ==
29 June 2013 1	Bölcske (Hungary)	2–14	(Hungary) Kecskeméti TE	Bölcske, Tolna County
16:00 CEST		(Report)	Balázs; Rajczi; Yannick; Koszó; Csillag; Csima; Kalmár	Stadium: Városi Sporttelep; Attendance: 150; Referee: (Hungary)

1 July 2013 2	AC Sparta Prague (Czech Republic)	3–1	(Hungary) Kecskeméti TE	Vorderweissenbach, Austria
CEST	Kadeřábek 78'; Matějovský 86'; Lafata 90+1'	(Report)	Rajczi 56' (pen.)	Attendance: 50; Referee: (Austria)

7 July 2013 3	Debreceni VSC (Hungary)	1–3	(Hungary) Kecskeméti TE	Debrecen, Hajdú-Bihar County
16:00 CEST	Horváth 27'	(Report)	Balázs 17'; Karan 45'; Rajczi 82'	Stadium: Pallag; Attendance: 300; Referee: (Hungary) Ferenc Karakó

10 July 2013 4	Kecskeméti TE (Hungary)	1–2	(Hungary) Kozármisleny SE	Kecskemét, Bács-Kiskun County
17:00 CEST	Rajczi 40'	(Report)	Turi 44'; Vituska 45+3'	Stadium: Széktói Stadion; Attendance: 500; Referee: (Hungary)

13 July 2013 5	Kecskeméti TE (Hungary)	0–2	(Serbia) FK Spartak Zlatibor Voda	Kecskemét, Bács-Kiskun County
17:00 CEST		(Report)		Stadium: Széktói Stadion; Attendance: 500; Referee: (Hungary)

17 July 2013 6	Kecskeméti TE (Hungary)	3–1	(Hungary) Ceglédi VSE	Kecskemét, Bács-Kiskun County
17:00 CEST	Mogyorósi 44'; Eliomar 51'; Gréczi 90'	(Report)	Horváth 115'	Stadium: Széktói Stadion; Attendance: 200; Referee: (Hungary)

20 July 2013 7	Kecskeméti TE (Hungary)	2–0	(Hungary) Békéscsaba 1912 Előre SE	Kecskemét, Bács-Kiskun County
18:00 CEST	Eliomar; Oussou	(Report)		Stadium: Széktói Stadion; Attendance: 700; Referee: (Hungary) Brezovai
