= 2012–13 Kecskeméti TE season =

Kecskeméti TE
2012–13 season
- Chairman: Pál Rózsa; János Versegi
- Manager: László Török (until 17 September); Ferenc Horváth
- NB 1: 7th
- Hungarian Cup: Second round
- Hungarian League Cup: Group stage
- Top goalscorer: League: Francis Litsingi (6); All: Francis Litsingi (11)
- Highest home attendance: 4,000 v Ferencváros (24 November 2012)
- Lowest home attendance: 200 v MTK (13 November 2012)
Home colours	Away colours

The 2012–13 season was Kecskeméti TE's 5th competitive season, 5th consecutive season in the OTP Bank Liga and 101st year in existence as a football club.

== First team squad ==
Note: Flags indicate national team as defined under FIFA eligibility rules; some limited exceptions apply. Players may hold more than one non-FIFA nationality.

No.	Pos.	Nation	Player
2	DF	HUN	Balázs Koszó
3	DF	HUN	József Mogyorósi
4	DF	HUN	Róbert Varga
7	FW	HUN	Zsolt Balázs
8	MF	HUN	Zsolt Patvaros
9	FW	BRA	Jorginho
10	MF	MNE	Vladan Savić
11	MF	HUN	Márkó Sós
13	DF	HUN	Krisztián Póti
14	MF	MNE	Marko Vukasović
18	MF	HUN	Attila Hullám
20	MF	GEO	Givi Ioseliani
21	FW	SLV	Rafael Burgos (on loan from SV Ried)

No.	Pos.	Nation	Player
22	DF	HUN	Dávid Mohl
23	DF	HUN	Gyula Forró
26	MF	HUN	Lajos Bertus
27	MF	CMR	Mbengono Yannick
28	DF	HUN	Tamás Vaskó
29	MF	HUN	Patrik Nagy
30	FW	NGA	Eugène Salami (on loan from Debreceni VSC)
77	FW	HUN	László Pekár
81	FW	HUN	Péter Rajczi
83	GK	HUN	Csaba Borszéki
92	MF	ARG	Edgardo Díaz
99	GK	HUN	Botond Antal

== Transfers ==
=== Summer ===
In: Note: Flags indicate national team as defined under FIFA eligibility rules; some limited exceptions apply. Players may hold more than one non-FIFA nationality.

No.	Pos.	Nation	Player
7	FW	HUN	Zsolt Balázs (from Zalaegerszeg)
9	FW	BRA	Jorginho (from (Malta) Qormi)
11	MF	HUN	Márkó Sós (from Rákospalota)
14	MF	HUN	Balázs Farkas (from Vasas)
20	FW	BRA	Tarabai (from (Malta) Hibernians)
21	FW	SLV	Rafael Burgos (loan from (Austria) Ried)
22	DF	HUN	Dávid Mohl (loan return from Debrecen)
24	MF	SRB	Predrag Vujović (from (Uzbekistan) Shurtan Guzar)
24	MF	HON	Luis Ramos (from Debrecen)
28	DF	HUN	Tamás Vaskó (from Videoton)
29	MF	HUN	Patrik Nagy (from Újpest)
30	FW	NGA	Eugène Salami (loan from Debrecen)
31	MF	CAN	Joseph Di Chiara (from (Russia) Krylia Sovetov)
83	GK	HUN	Csaba Borszéki (loan return from Vác)
—	MF	SRB	Milan Cokić (from (Serbia) Mladenovac)

Out: Note: Flags indicate national team as defined under FIFA eligibility rules; some limited exceptions apply. Players may hold more than one non-FIFA nationality.

No.	Pos.	Nation	Player
4	DF	HUN	Róbert Varga (to Debrecen)
7	MF	SRB	Aleksandar Alempijević (to Ferencváros)
9	FW	HUN	Marcell Balog (to Cegléd)
14	MF	SRB	Vladan Čukić (to Ferencváros)
19	FW	HUN	Ádám Hegedűs
20	MF	HUN	Balázs Sarus (to Csorna)
21	MF	HUN	Gábor Bori (to Paks)
22	DF	HUN	Dávid Mohl (loan to Debrecen)
24	MF	SRB	Predrag Vujović (to (Serbia) Metalac)
29	FW	HUN	László Lencse (loan return to Videoton)
33	GK	HUN	Gábor Németh
55	FW	HUN	Attila Tököli (to Paks)
83	GK	HUN	Csaba Borszéki (loan to Vác)
—	MF	SRB	Milan Cokić (loan to Siófok)
—	MF	SRB	Vladan Brdarić (to Cegléd)

=== Winter ===
In: Note: Flags indicate national team as defined under FIFA eligibility rules; some limited exceptions apply. Players may hold more than one non-FIFA nationality.

No.	Pos.	Nation	Player
3	DF	HUN	József Mogyorósi (from Siófok)
4	DF	HUN	Róbert Varga (from Debrecen)
14	MF	MNE	Marko Vukasović (from (Serbia) Novi Sad)
17	MF	CMR	Christian Ebala (loan return from (Kazakhstan) Astana)
18	MF	HUN	Attila Hullám (from Szigetszentmiklós)
20	MF	GEO	Givi Ioseliani (from (Georgia (country)) Kutaisi)
20	MF	CTA	Foxi Kethevoama (loan return from (Kazakhstan) Astana)
27	MF	CMR	Mbengono Yannick (from Debrecen)
81	FW	HUN	Péter Rajczi (from Újpest)
92	MF	ARG	Edgardo Díaz (from (Chile) Naval)
—	FW	HUN	Ádám Kovács (loan from Nyíregyháza)
—	MF	SRB	Milan Cokić (loan return from Siófok)

Out: Note: Flags indicate national team as defined under FIFA eligibility rules; some limited exceptions apply. Players may hold more than one non-FIFA nationality.

No.	Pos.	Nation	Player
6	DF	HUN	Béla Balogh (to Pécs)
14	MF	HUN	Balázs Farkas (to Mezőkövesd)
15	DF	ROU	Attila Gyagya (loan to Szolnok)
18	FW	CGO	Francis Litsingi (to (Czech Republic) Teplice)
19	FW	CIV	Sindou Dosso (to (Romania) UTA Arad)
20	FW	BRA	Tarabai (to (Malta) Hibernians)
20	MF	CTA	Foxi Kethevoama (to (Kazakhstan) Astana)
24	MF	HON	Luis Ramos (to Debrecen)
31	MF	CAN	Joseph Di Chiara (to (Russia) Torpedo Moscow)
88	DF	HUN	Viktor Tölgyesi (loan to Gyirmót)
—	DF	HUN	András Farkas (loan to Baja)
—	MF	SRB	Milan Cokić (loan to Baja)

- List of Hungarian football transfers summer 2012
- List of Hungarian football transfers winter 2012–13

== Statistics ==
=== Appearances and goals ===
Last updated on 2 June 2013.

No.	Pos	Nat	Player	Total		OTP Bank Liga		Hungarian Cup		League Cup	
No.	Pos	Nat	Player	Apps	Goals	Apps	Goals	Apps	Goals	Apps	Goals
2	DF	(Hungary) HUN	Balázs Koszó	18	0	14	0	1	0	3	0
3	DF	(Hungary) HUN	József Mogyorósi	11	2	11	2	0	0	0	0
4	DF	(Hungary) HUN	Róbert Varga	9	1	9	1	0	0	0	0
7	FW	(Hungary) HUN	Zsolt Balázs	19	4	13	3	1	0	5	1
8	MF	(Hungary) HUN	Zsolt Patvaros	18	1	15	1	0	0	3	0
9	FW	(Brazil) BRA	Jorginho	18	4	14	2	1	0	3	2
10	MF	(Montenegro) MNE	Vladan Savić	30	1	27	1	1	0	2	0
11	MF	(Hungary) HUN	Márkó Sós	14	2	11	2	0	0	3	0
13	DF	(Hungary) HUN	Krisztián Póti	22	0	19	0	1	0	2	0
14	MF	(Montenegro) MNE	Marko Vukasović	12	0	12	0	0	0	0	0
18	MF	(Hungary) HUN	Attila Hullám	6	0	6	0	0	0	0	0
20	MF	(Georgia (country)) GEO	Givi Ioseliani	4	0	4	0	0	0	0	0
21	FW	(El Salvador) SLV	Rafael Burgos	21	6	20	5	0	0	1	1
22	DF	(Hungary) HUN	Dávid Mohl	23	5	19	5	0	0	4	0
23	DF	(Hungary) HUN	Gyula Forró	30	1	26	1	1	0	3	0
26	FW	(Hungary) HUN	Lajos Bertus	13	1	8	1	1	0	4	0
27	MF	(Cameroon) CMR	Mbengono Yannick	5	0	5	0	0	0	0	0
28	DF	(Hungary) HUN	Tamás Vaskó	31	1	26	1	1	0	4	0
29	MF	(Hungary) HUN	Patrik Nagy	7	0	3	0	1	0	3	0
30	FW	(Nigeria) NGA	Eugène Salami	24	7	20	4	0	0	4	3
77	FW	(Hungary) HUN	László Pekár	25	2	23	2	0	0	2	0
81	FW	(Hungary) HUN	Péter Rajczi	10	2	10	2	0	0	0	0
83	GK	(Hungary) HUN	Csaba Borszéki	16	-22	14	-19	0	0	2	-3
92	MF	(Argentina) ARG	Edgardo Díaz	4	0	4	0	0	0	0	0
99	GK	(Hungary) HUN	Botond Antal	19	-20	14	-12	1	-4	4	-4
Young players:
Players out to loan:
15	DF	(Romania) ROU	Attila Gyagya	2	0	0	0	0	0	2	0
88	DF	(Hungary) HUN	Viktor Tölgyesi	5	0	4	0	0	0	1	0
Players no longer at the club:
6	DF	(Hungary) HUN	Béla Balogh	14	0	10	0	0	0	4	0
14	MF	(Hungary) HUN	Balázs Farkas	10	0	4	0	1	0	5	0
18	MF	(Republic of the Congo) CGO	Francis Litsingi	22	11	17	6	1	2	4	3
19	FW	(Ivory Coast) CIV	Sindou Dosso	7	1	3	0	0	0	4	1
20	FW	(Brazil) BRA	Tarabai	17	1	11	1	1	0	5	0
21	MF	(Hungary) HUN	Gábor Bori	5	0	5	0	0	0	0	0
24	MF	(Honduras) HON	Luis Ramos	14	0	10	0	1	0	3	0
31	MF	(Canada) CAN	Joseph Di Chiara	1	0	0	0	0	0	1	0
33	GK	(Hungary) HUN	Gábor Németh	5	-10	5	-10	0	0	0	0

=== Top scorers ===
Includes all competitive matches. The list is sorted by shirt number when total goals are equal.

Last updated on 2 June 2013

Position	Nation	Number	Name	OTP Bank Liga	Hungarian Cup	League Cup	Total
1	(Republic of the Congo)	18	Francis Litsingi	6	2	3	11
2	(Nigeria)	30	Eugène Salami	4	0	3	7
3	(El Salvador)	21	Rafael Burgos	5	0	1	6
4	(Hungary)	22	Dávid Mohl	5	0	0	5
5	(Hungary)	7	Zsolt Balázs	3	0	1	4
6	(Brazil)	9	Jorginho	2	0	2	4
7	(Hungary)	11	Márkó Sós	2	0	0	2
8	(Hungary)	77	László Pekár	2	0	0	2
9	(Hungary)	3	József Mogyorósi	2	0	0	2
10	(Hungary)	81	Péter Rajczi	2	0	0	2
11	(Hungary)	28	Tamás Vaskó	1	0	0	1
12	(Brazil)	20	Tarabai	1	0	0	1
13	(Hungary)	8	Zsolt Patvaros	1	0	0	1
14	(Montenegro)	10	Vladan Savić	1	0	0	1
15	(Hungary)	23	Gyula Forró	1	0	0	1
16	(Hungary)	4	Róbert Varga	1	0	0	1
17	(Hungary)	26	Lajos Bertus	1	0	0	1
18	(Ivory Coast)	19	Sindou Dosso	0	0	1	1
/	/	/	Own Goals	2	0	1	3
			TOTALS	42	2	12	56

=== Disciplinary record ===
Includes all competitive matches. Players with 1 card or more included only.

Last updated on 2 June 2013

Position	Nation	Number	Name	OTP Bank Liga		Hungarian Cup		League Cup		Total (Hu Total)	
Position	Nation	Number	Name	Booked	Sent off (straight red)	Booked	Sent off (straight red)	Booked	Sent off (straight red)	Booked	Sent off (straight red)
DF	(Hungary)	2	Balázs Koszó	1	0	1	0	1	0	3 (1)	0 (0)
DF	(Hungary)	3	József Mogyorósi	3	0	0	0	0	0	3 (3)	0 (0)
DF	(Hungary)	4	Róbert Varga	4	0	0	0	0	0	4 (4)	0 (0)
DF	(Hungary)	6	Béla Balogh	0	1	0	0	1	0	1 (0)	1 (1)
MF	(Hungary)	8	Zsolt Patvaros	4	0	0	0	0	0	4 (4)	0 (0)
FW	(Brazil)	9	Jorginho	2	0	0	0	0	0	2 (2)	0 (0)
MF	(Montenegro)	10	Vladan Savić	5	0	0	0	0	0	5 (5)	0 (0)
MF	(Hungary)	11	Márkó Sós	4	0	0	0	0	0	4 (4)	0 (0)
DF	(Hungary)	13	Krisztián Póti	6	0	1	0	0	0	7 (6)	0 (0)
MF	(Montenegro)	14	Marko Vukasović	3	1	0	0	0	0	3 (3)	1 (1)
MF	(Hungary)	14	Balázs Farkas	0	1	0	0	0	0	0 (0)	1 (1)
DF	(Romania)	15	Attila Gyagya	0	0	0	0	1	0	1 (0)	0 (0)
FW	(Republic of the Congo)	18	Francis Litsingi	2	0	1	0	0	0	3 (2)	0 (0)
FW	(Ivory Coast)	19	Sindou Dosso	0	0	0	0	1	0	1 (0)	0 (0)
MF	(Georgia (country))	20	Givi Ioseliani	1	0	0	0	0	0	1 (1)	0 (0)
FW	(Brazil)	20	Tarabai	1	0	0	0	2	0	3 (1)	0 (0)
MF	(Hungary)	21	Gábor Bori	2	0	0	0	0	0	2 (2)	0 (0)
DF	(Hungary)	22	Dávid Mohl	5	1	0	0	0	1	5 (5)	2 (1)
DF	(Hungary)	23	Gyula Forró	5	0	0	0	1	0	6 (5)	0 (0)
MF	(Honduras)	24	Luis Ramos	2	1	1	0	0	0	3 (2)	1 (1)
MF	(Cameroon)	27	Mbengono Yannick	1	0	0	0	0	0	1 (1)	0 (0)
DF	(Hungary)	28	Tamás Vaskó	9	1	0	0	0	1	9 (9)	2 (1)
MF	(Hungary)	29	Patrik Nagy	1	0	0	0	1	0	2 (1)	0 (0)
FW	(Nigeria)	30	Eugène Salami	5	0	0	0	1	0	6 (5)	0 (0)
FW	(Hungary)	77	László Pekár	4	0	0	0	0	0	4 (4)	0 (0)
FW	(Hungary)	81	Péter Rajczi	2	1	0	0	0	0	2 (2)	1 (1)
MF	(Argentina)	92	Edgardo Díaz	2	0	0	0	0	0	2 (2)	0 (0)
GK	(Hungary)	99	Botond Antal	1	3	0	0	0	0	1 (1)	3 (3)
			TOTALS	75	10	4	0	9	2	88 (75)	12 (10)

=== Overall ===
Games played	37 (30 OTP Bank Liga, 1 Hungarian Cup and 6 Hungarian League Cup)
Games won	14 (12 OTP Bank Liga, 0 Hungarian Cup and 2 Hungarian League Cup)
Games drawn	11 (8 OTP Bank Liga, 0 Hungarian Cup and 3 Hungarian League Cup)
Games lost	12 (10 OTP Bank Liga, 1 Hungarian Cup and 1 Hungarian League Cup)
Goals scored	56
Goals conceded	53
Goal difference	+3
Yellow cards	88
Red cards	12
Worst discipline	(Hungary) Tamás Vaskó (9 (yellow card) , 2 (red card) )
Best result	5–0 (H) v Szolnoki MÁV FC - Ligakupa - 04-09-2012
Worst result	1–5 (A) v Győri ETO FC - OTP Bank Liga - 25-08-2012
Worst result	1–5 (H) v Videoton FC - OTP Bank Liga - 26-05-2013
Most appearances	(Hungary) Tamás Vaskó (31 appearances)
Top scorer	(Republic of the Congo) Francis Litsingi (11 goal)
Points	53/111 (47.75%)

Last updated: 2 June 2013

== Nemzeti Bajnokság I ==
=== Matches ===
28 July 2012 1	Ferencváros	1–1	Kecskemét	Budapest, Pest County
20:45 CEST	Alempijević 33'	(Report)	Jorginho 63'	Stadium: Stadion Albert Flórián; Attendance: 5,000; Referee: (Hungary) Zsolt Szabó

5 August 2012 2	Kecskemét	1–1	MTK Budapest	Kecskemét, Bács-Kiskun County
17:00 CEST	Sós 43'	(Report)	Könyves 75'	Stadium: Széktói Stadion; Attendance: 1,700; Referee: (Hungary) Tamás Bognár

11 August 2012 3	Debrecen	2–1	Kecskemét	Debrecen, Hajdú-Bihar County
17:00 CEST	Kulcsár 23'; Coulibaly 73'	(Report)	Vaskó 53'	Stadium: Stadion Oláh Gábor Út; Attendance: 4,500; Referee: (Hungary) Ádám Farkas

17 August 2012 4	Kecskemét	1–2	Kaposvár	Kecskemét, Bács-Kiskun County
19:00 CEST	Sós 15'	(Report)	Vručina 5', 50'	Stadium: Széktói Stadion; Attendance: 2,500; Referee: (Hungary) Gábor Oláh

25 August 2012 5	Győr	5–1	Kecskemét	Győr, Győr-Moson-Sopron County
18:30 CEST	Varga 8'; Koltai 31' (pen.); Střeštík 38'; Kamber 76'; Kronaveter 80'	(Report)	Jorginho 64'	Stadium: ETO Park; Attendance: 1,000; Referee: (Hungary) Szabolcs Szilasi

31 August 2012 6	Pécs	0–1	Kecskemét	Pécs, Baranya County
17:00 CEST		(Report)	Balázs 83'	Stadium: Stadion PMFC; Attendance: 1,000; Referee: (Hungary) Zoltán Iványi

15 September 2012 7	Kecskemét	1–2	Pápa	Kecskemét, Bács-Kiskun County
16:00 CEST	Litsingi 11'	(Report)	Marić 41', 81' (pen.)	Stadium: Széktói Stadion; Attendance: 1,000; Referee: (Hungary) Péter Solymosi

22 September 2012 8	Újpest	2–1	Kecskemét	Budapest, Pest County
14:00 CEST	Kabát 42'; Vasiljević 45'	(Report)	Litsingi 38'	Stadium: Szusza Ferenc Stadium; Attendance: 2,000; Referee: (Hungary) István Vad

29 September 2012 9	Kecskemét	2–1	Budapest Honvéd	Kecskemét, Bács-Kiskun County
14:00 CEST	Litsingi 3', 30'	(Report)	Délczeg 28'	Stadium: Széktói Stadion; Attendance: 2,000; Referee: (Hungary) Roland Veizer

6 October 2012 10	Eger	0–2	Kecskemét	Debrecen, Hajdú-Bihar County
16:00 CEST		(Report)	Knakal 24' (o.g.); Burgos 46'	Stadium: Stadion Oláh Gábor Út; Attendance: 200; Referee: (Hungary) Tamás Bognár

20 October 2012 11	Kecskemét	2–1	Szombathely	Kecskemét, Bács-Kiskun County
16:00 CEST	Tarabai 84'; Litsingi 90+3'	(Report)	Nagy 43'	Stadium: Széktói Stadion; Attendance: 1,000; Referee: (Hungary) József Erdős

26 October 2012 12	Siófok	0–2	Kecskemét	Siófok, Somogy County
17:00 CEST		(Report)	Salami 31'; Patvaros 58'	Stadium: Révész Street Stadium; Attendance: 150; Referee: (Hungary) Gábor Oláh

2 November 2012 13	Kecskemét	1–1	Diósgyőr	Kecskemét, Bács-Kiskun County
17:00 CET	Savić 49'	(Report)	Tisza 25'	Stadium: Széktói Stadion; Attendance: 1,000; Referee: (Hungary) Sándor Andó-Szabó

11 November 2012 14	Videoton	2–0	Kecskemét	Székesfehérvár, Fejér County
18:30 CET	Nikolić 64'; Mitrović 87'	(Report)		Stadium: Sóstói Stadion; Attendance: 3,500; Referee: (Hungary) Ádám Farkas

17 November 2012 15	Kecskemét	1–1	Paks	Kecskemét, Bács-Kiskun County
16:00 CET	Pekár 90'	(Report)	Vaskó 16' (o.g.)	Stadium: Széktói Stadion; Attendance: 2,433; Referee: (Hungary) Ádám Németh

24 November 2012 16	Kecskemét	2–2	Ferencváros	Kecskemét, Bács-Kiskun County
16:00 CET	Burgos 28'; Forró 50'	(Report)	Böde 63'; Jenner 80'	Stadium: Széktói Stadion; Attendance: 4,000; Referee: (Hungary) Tamás Bognár

1 December 2012 17	MTK Budapest	3–1	Kecskemét	Budapest, Pest County
16:30 CET	Csiki 11', 30'; Vass 40'	(Report)	Litsingi 72'	Stadium: Hidegkuti Nándor Stadium; Attendance: 1,100; Referee: (Hungary) Zsolt Szabó

2 February 2013 18	Kecskemét	0–0	Debrecen	Kecskemét, Bács-Kiskun County
14:00 CET		(Report)		Stadium: Széktói Stadion; Attendance: 1,500; Referee: (Hungary) István Vad

8 March 2013 19	Kaposvár	2–3	Kecskemét	Kaposvár, Somogy County
19:00 CET	Oláh 15'; Waltner 81' (pen.)	(Report)	Mohl 19'; Pekár 48'; Burgos 70'	Stadium: Stadion Kaposvár Rákóczi; Attendance: 2,500; Referee: (Hungary) Viktor Kassai

23 April 2013 20	Kecskemét	5–2	Győr	Kecskemét, Bács-Kiskun County
18:00 CEST	Mohl 4' (pen.); Varga 10'; Burgos 34'; Salami 71'; Balázs 90+1'	(Report)	Varga 24'; Kamber 36'	Stadium: Széktói Stadion; Attendance: 1,800; Referee: (Hungary) Zsolt Szabó

30 March 2013 21	Kecskemét	0–2	Pécs	Kecskemét, Bács-Kiskun County
16:00 CET		(Report)	Grumić 56'; Simon 82'	Stadium: Széktói Stadion; Attendance: 2,000; Referee: (Hungary) Roland Veizer

6 April 2013 22	Pápa	0–2	Kecskemét	Pápa, Veszprém County
16:00 CEST		(Report)	Balázs 72'; Salami 85'	Stadium: Stadion Várkerti; Attendance: 500; Referee: (Hungary) Viktor Kassai

14 April 2013 23	Kecskemét	1–0	Újpest	Kecskemét, Bács-Kiskun County
18:30 CEST	Mogyorósi 61'	(Report)		Stadium: Széktói Stadion; Attendance: 2,122; Referee: (Hungary) Sándor Andó-Szabó

20 April 2013 24	Budapest Honvéd	0–0	Kecskemét	Budapest, Pest County
14:00 CEST		(Report)		Stadium: Bozsik Stadion; Attendance: 1,500; Referee: (Hungary) Gábor Oláh

26 April 2013 25	Kecskemét	3–1	Eger	Kecskemét, Bács-Kiskun County
17:00 CEST	Raković 6' (o.g.); Mohl 22'; Rajczi 26'	(Report)	Zvara 34'	Stadium: Széktói Stadion; Attendance: 2,000; Referee: (Hungary) Ádám Radványi

3 May 2013 26	Szombathely	1–1	Kecskemét	Szombathely, Vas County
19:00 CEST	Andorka 82'	(Report)	Mogyorósi 85'	Stadium: Rohonci úti Stadion; Attendance: 1,869; Referee: (Hungary) Szabolcs Szilasi

11 May 2013 27	Kecskemét	3–1	Siófok	Kecskemét, Bács-Kiskun County
14:00 CEST	Burgos 14'; Mohl 49'; Salami 68'	(Report)	Kiss 53'	Stadium: Széktói Stadion; Attendance: 2,000; Referee: (Hungary) Mihály Fábián

19 May 2013 28	Diósgyőr	2–1	Kecskemét	Miskolc, Borsod-Abaúj-Zemplén County
16:30 CEST	Gohér 77'; Luque 82' (pen.)	(Report)	Rajczi 23'	Stadium: DVTK Stadion; Attendance: 3,500; Referee: (Hungary) Ádám Németh

26 May 2013 29	Kecskemét	1–5	Videoton	Kecskemét, Bács-Kiskun County
18:30 CEST	Mohl 37'	(Report)	Juhász 16', 86'; Szolnoki 22'; Torghelle 53'; Paraiba 62'	Stadium: Széktói Stadion; Attendance: 1,500; Referee: (Hungary) Gábor Oláh

31 May 2013 30	Paks	0–1	Kecskemét	Paks, Tolna County
17:00 CEST		(Report)	Bertus 71'	Stadium: Stadion PSE; Attendance: 500; Referee: (Hungary) Péter Solymosi

=== Classification ===
Pos	Team	Pld	W	D	L	GF	GA	GD	Pts	Qualification or relegation
5	Ferencváros	30	13	10	7	51	36	+15	49	
6	Debrecen	30	14	4	12	47	36	+11	46	Qualification for Europa League second qualifying round (Note: Debrecen qualified for the Europa League second qualifying round as the 2012–13 Magyar Kupa winners.)
7	Kecskemét	30	12	8	10	42	42	0	44	
8	Haladás	30	11	11	8	36	27	+9	44	
9	Újpest	30	11	8	11	40	42	−2	41	

Source: mlsz.hu (in Hungarian)
Rules for classification: 1st points; 2nd overall wins; 3rd goal difference; 4th head-to-head points; 5th head-to-head goal difference; 6th head-to-head away goals scored; 7th fair-play points; 8th drawing of lots

=== Results summary ===
Overall								Home						Away					
Pld	W	D	L	GF	GA	GD	Pts	W	D	L	GF	GA	GD	W	D	L	GF	GA	GD
30	12	8	10	42	42	0	44	6	5	4	24	22	+2	6	3	6	18	20	−2

Last updated: 2 June 2013.
Source: NB1

=== Results by round ===
Round	1	2	3	4	5	6	7	8	9	10	11	12	13	14	15	16	17	18	19	20	21	22	23	24	25	26	27	28	29	30
Ground	A	H	A	H	A	A	H	A	H	A	H	A	H	A	H	H	A	H	A	H	H	A	H	A	H	A	H	A	H	A
Result	D	D	L	L	L	W	L	L	W	W	W	W	D	L	D	D	L	D	W	W	L	W	W	D	W	D	W	L	L	W
Position	9	9	12	13	14	15	14	15	14	11	8	7	6	9	10	11	12	13	10	8	10	8	7	7	7	7	7	7	8	7

Updated to match(es) played on 2 June 2013. Source: Matches
A = Away; H = Home; W = Win; D = Draw; L = Loss

== Hungarian Cup ==
26 September 2012 2	Nyíregyháza Spartacus FC	4–2	Kecskeméti TE	Nyíregyháza, Szabolcs-Szatmár-Bereg County
15:30 CEST	Germán 15'; Petneházi 62', 89'; Csorba 81'	(Report)	Litsingi 79', 90+1' (pen.)	Stadium: Városi Stadion; Attendance: 600; Referee: (Hungary) Ádám Farkas

== League Cup ==
=== Group stage ===
4 August 2012 1	Kecskemét	5–0	Szolnok	Kecskemét, Bács-Kiskun County
18:00 CEST	Jorginho 7', 45'; Litsingi 25', 47' (pen.); Salami 80'	(Report)		Stadium: Széktói Stadion; Attendance: 300; Referee: (Hungary) László Varga

9 September 2012 2	Ferencváros	2–1	Kecskemét	Budapest, Pest County
18:30 CEST	Somália 27'; Böde 66'	(Report)	Balázs 42'	Stadium: Stadion Albert Flórián; Attendance: 500; Referee: (Hungary) Sándor Andó-Szabó

10 October 2012 3	MTK Budapest	0–1	Kecskemét	Budapest, Pest County
15:00 CEST		(Report)	Salami 66'	Stadium: Stadion Hidegkuti Nándor; Attendance: 100; Referee: (Hungary) Krisztián Pánczél

13 October 2012 4	Kecskemét	2–2	Ferencváros	Kecskemét, Bács-Kiskun County
16:00 CEST	Salami 10'; Litsingi 15'	(Report)	Jenner 36'; Ionescu 60'	Stadium: Széktói Stadion; Attendance: 700; Referee: (Hungary) Szabolcs Szilasi

13 November 2012 5	Kecskemét	1–1	MTK Budapest	Kecskemét, Bács-Kiskun County
18:00 CET	Burgos 46'	(Report)	Balajti 80' (pen.)	Stadium: Széktói Stadion; Attendance: 200; Referee: (Hungary) Zoltán J. Kovács

5 December 2012 6	Szolnok	2–2	Kecskemét	Szolnok, Jász-Nagykun-Szolnok County
13:00 CET	Kocsis 43'; Vári 84'	(Report)	Dosso 52' (pen.); Kiprich 90+2' (o.g.)	Stadium: Tiszaligeti Stadion; Attendance: 100; Referee: (Hungary) Katalin Kulcsár

==== Classification ====
Pos	Team	Pld	W	D	L	GF	GA	GD	Pts	Qualification
1	Ferencváros	6	5	1	0	14	4	+10	16	Advance to knockout phase
2	Kecskemét	6	2	3	1	12	7	+5	9	
3	MTK	6	1	2	3	5	7	−2	5	
4	Szolnok	6	0	2	4	5	18	−13	2	

Rules for classification: 1) points; 2) goal difference; 3) number of goals scored.
