= 2014–15 Videoton FC season =

Videoton FC
2014–15 season
- Chairman: (Hungary) István Garancsi
- Manager: (Spain) Joan Carrillo Milan
- NB 1: 2nd
- Magyar Kupa: Runners-up
- Ligakupa: Quarter-final
- Top goalscorer: League: Nemanja Nikolić (21); All: Nemanja Nikolić (24)
Home colours	Away colours	Third colours

The 2014–15 season was Videoton FC's 46th competitive season, 15th consecutive season in the OTP Bank Liga and 73rd year in existence as a football club.

== First team squad ==
Note: Flags indicate national team as defined under FIFA eligibility rules; some limited exceptions apply. Players may hold more than one non-FIFA nationality.

No.	Pos.	Nation	Player
1	GK	ESP	Juan Calatayud
2	DF	ESP	Álvaro Brachi
3	DF	BRA	Paulo Vinícius
4	DF	POR	Marco Caneira
5	MF	HUN	Tibor Heffler
6	DF	HUN	András Fejes
7	MF	HUN	Ádám Gyurcsó
8	MF	HUN	László Kleinheisler
9	FW	HUN	Róbert Feczesin
10	MF	HUN	István Kovács

No.	Pos.	Nation	Player
11	MF	HUN	György Sándor
12	MF	ESA	Arturo Alvarez
16	MF	POR	Filipe Oliveira
17	FW	HUN	Nemanja Nikolić
22	DF	CPV	Stopira
23	DF	HUN	Roland Juhász
30	DF	HUN	Roland Szolnoki
33	MF	CRO	Dinko Trebotić
46	MF	HUN	Ádám Simon

== Transfers ==
=== Summer ===
In: Note: Flags indicate national team as defined under FIFA eligibility rules; some limited exceptions apply. Players may hold more than one non-FIFA nationality.

No.	Pos.	Nation	Player
—	DF	HUN	Zsolt Nagy (loan from Puskás)
—	FW	HUN	Róbert Feczesin (from (Italy) Padova)
—	GK	HUN	Tamás Horváth (from Mezőkövesd)
—	MF	CRO	Dinko Trebotić (from (Croatia) Lokomotiva)
—	MF	HUN	Ádám Simon (from (Italy) Palermo)
—	DF	HUN	András Fejes (from Videoton II)
—	MF	HUN	Dénes Szakály (loan return from Puskás)
—	DF	GRE	Vassilios Apostolopoulos (loan return from Puskás)
—	DF	HUN	Adrián Szekeres (loan return from Puskás)
—	FW	HUN	László Lencse (loan return from Puskás)
—	MF	HUN	Balázs Tóth (loan return from Puskás)
—	MF	HUN	Donát Zsótér (loan return from Szolnok)
—	FW	SRB	Milan Perić (loan return from Pécs)
14	DF	MAR	Sofian Chakla (from (Spain) Real Betis B)

Out: Note: Flags indicate national team as defined under FIFA eligibility rules; some limited exceptions apply. Players may hold more than one non-FIFA nationality.

No.	Pos.	Nation	Player
3	FW	SRB	Milan Perić (loan to Dunaújváros)
5	DF	GRE	Vassilios Apostolopoulos
5	MF	POR	Vítor Gomes
6	MF	BRA	Nildo Petrolina
7	MF	HUN	Dénes Szakály (to Puskás)
7	FW	BRA	Paraíba
9	FW	POR	Jucie Lupeta (to (Portugal) Setúbal)
12	GK	SVK	Tomáš Tujvel (loan to Kecskemét)
18	MF	HUN	Máté Papp (loan to Puskás)
19	FW	HUN	László Lencse (to Puskás)
20	MF	HUN	Donát Zsótér (loan to Dunaújváros)
21	DF	HUN	Adrián Szekeres (loan to Dunaújváros)
24	DF	GBS	Mamadu Candé
26	MF	HUN	Balázs Tóth (loan to Puskás)
29	FW	CPV	Zé Luís (loan return to (Portugal) Braga)
99	MF	SRB	Uroš Nikolić (to Videoton II)

- List of Hungarian football transfers summer 2014

== Statistics ==
=== Appearances and goals ===
Last updated on 26 October 2014.

No.	Pos	Nat	Player	Total		OTP Bank Liga		Hungarian Cup		League Cup	
No.	Pos	Nat	Player	Apps	Goals	Apps	Goals	Apps	Goals	Apps	Goals
1	GK	(Spain) ESP	Juan Calatayud	13	-6	12	-5	1	-1	0	0
2	DF	(Spain) ESP	Álvaro Brachi	4	0	2	0	0	0	2	0
3	DF	(Brazil) BRA	Paulo Vinícius	13	0	12	0	0	0	1	0
4	DF	(Portugal) POR	Marco Caneira	7	1	1	0	3	1	3	0
5	MF	(Hungary) HUN	Tibor Heffler	8	0	3	0	2	0	3	0
6	DF	(Hungary) HUN	András Fejes	9	1	2	0	3	1	4	0
7	MF	(Hungary) HUN	Ádám Gyurcsó	11	2	11	2	0	0	0	0
8	MF	(Hungary) HUN	László Kleinheisler	13	0	8	0	2	0	3	0
9	FW	(Hungary) HUN	Róbert Feczesin	15	12	8	1	3	6	4	5
10	MF	(Hungary) HUN	István Kovács	13	5	10	4	2	0	1	1
11	MF	(Hungary) HUN	György Sándor	14	1	12	1	0	0	2	0
12	MF	(El Salvador) ESA	Arturo Alvarez	12	2	9	0	2	1	1	1
16	MF	(Portugal) POR	Filipe Oliveira	18	5	12	2	2	1	4	2
17	FW	(Hungary) HUN	Nemanja Nikolić	11	13	11	13	0	0	0	0
22	DF	(Cape Verde) CPV	Stopira	11	0	11	0	0	0	0	0
23	DF	(Hungary) HUN	Roland Juhász	12	4	12	4	0	0	0	0
30	DF	(Hungary) HUN	Roland Szolnoki	14	0	10	0	2	0	2	0
33	MF	(Croatia) CRO	Dinko Trebotić	17	1	10	0	3	1	4	0
46	MF	(Hungary) HUN	Ádám Simon	13	0	12	0	0	0	1	0
Youth players:
14	DF	(Morocco) MAR	Soufian Chakla	7	2	0	0	3	2	4	0
23	DF	(Hungary) HUN	Zsolt Nagy	7	1	0	0	3	1	4	0
31	GK	(Hungary) HUN	Tamás Horváth	6	-3	0	0	2	0	4	-3
34	DF	(Hungary) HUN	Gergő Kocsis	1	0	0	0	0	0	1	0
35	FW	(Hungary) HUN	Domonique Vallejos	2	1	0	0	1	1	1	0
35	DF	(Hungary) HUN	Bence Király	1	0	0	0	1	0	0	0
36	MF	(Hungary) HUN	Patrik Paudits	1	0	0	0	1	0	0	0
36	MF	(Hungary) HUN	Péter Valkovszki	5	0	0	0	1	0	4	0
36	MF	(Hungary) HUN	Krisztián Géresi	1	0	0	0	0	0	1	0
37	FW	(Hungary) HUN	Bertalan Véninger	3	0	0	0	1	0	2	0
38	MF	(Hungary) HUN	Ádám Ács	1	1	0	0	0	0	1	1
40	FW	(Hungary) HUN	Viktor Sejben	2	1	0	0	1	0	1	1
77	MF	(Croatia) CRO	Marko Pajač	4	2	0	0	2	2	2	0
88	MF	(Hungary) HUN	Zsolt Haraszti	1	0	0	0	1	0	0	0
Players no longer at the club:

=== Top scorers ===
Includes all competitive matches. The list is sorted by shirt number when total goals are equal.

Last updated on 26 October 2014

Position	Nation	Number	Name	OTP Bank Liga	Hungarian Cup	League Cup	Total
1	(Hungary)	17	Nemanja Nikolić	13	0	0	13
2	(Hungary)	9	Róbert Feczesin	1	6	5	12
3	(Hungary)	10	István Kovács	4	0	1	5
4	(Portugal)	16	Filipe Oliveira	2	1	2	5
5	(Hungary)	23	Roland Juhász	4	0	0	4
6	(Hungary)	7	Ádám Gyurcsó	2	0	0	2
7	(Croatia)	77	Marko Pajač	0	2	0	2
8	(Morocco)	14	Soufian Chakla	0	2	0	2
9	(El Salvador)	12	Arturo Alvarez	0	1	1	2
10	(Hungary)	11	György Sándor	1	0	0	1
11	(Portugal)	4	Marco Caneira	0	1	0	1
12	(Hungary)	35	Domonique Vallejos	0	1	0	1
13	(Hungary)	25	Zsolt Nagy	0	1	0	1
14	(Croatia)	33	Dinko Trebotić	0	1	0	1
15	(Hungary)	6	András Fejes	0	1	0	1
16	(Hungary)	40	Viktor Sejben	0	0	1	1
17	(Hungary)	38	Ádám Ács	0	0	1	1
/	/	/	Own Goals	3	0	1	4
			TOTALS	30	16	12	58

=== Disciplinary record ===
Includes all competitive matches. Players with 1 card or more included only.

Last updated on 26 October 2014

Position	Nation	Number	Name	OTP Bank Liga		Hungarian Cup		League Cup		Total (Hu Total)	
Position	Nation	Number	Name	Yellow card	Red card	Yellow card	Red card	Yellow card	Red card	Yellow card	Red card
DF	(Brazil)	3	Paulo Vinícius	4	0	0	0	0	0	4 (4)	0 (0)
DF	(Portugal)	4	Marco Caneira	1	0	0	0	0	0	1 (1)	0 (0)
DF	(Hungary)	6	András Fejes	0	0	0	0	1	0	1 (0)	0 (0)
MF	(Hungary)	7	Ádám Gyurcsó	1	0	0	0	0	0	1 (1)	0 (0)
FW	(Hungary)	9	Róbert Feczesin	1	0	1	0	0	0	2 (1)	0 (0)
MF	(Hungary)	10	István Kovács	2	1	0	0	0	0	2 (2)	1 (1)
MF	(Hungary)	11	György Sándor	2	0	0	0	0	0	2 (2)	0 (0)
MF	(El Salvador)	12	Arturo Alvarez	1	0	0	0	0	0	1 (1)	0 (0)
MF	(Portugal)	16	Filipe Oliveira	3	0	0	0	0	0	3 (3)	0 (0)
FW	(Hungary)	17	Nemanja Nikolić	3	0	0	0	0	0	3 (3)	0 (0)
DF	(Cape Verde)	22	Stopira	1	0	0	0	0	0	1 (1)	0 (0)
DF	(Hungary)	23	Roland Juhász	3	0	0	0	0	0	3 (3)	0 (0)
DF	(Hungary)	30	Roland Szolnoki	3	0	0	0	0	0	3 (3)	0 (0)
MF	(Croatia)	33	Dinko Trebotić	1	0	0	0	0	0	1 (1)	0 (0)
MF	(Hungary)	46	Ádám Simon	2	0	0	0	0	0	2 (2)	0 (0)
MF	(Croatia)	77	Marko Pajač	0	0	0	0	0	1	0 (0)	1 (0)
			TOTALS	28	1	1	0	1	1	30 (28)	2 (1)

=== Overall ===
Games played	19 (12 OTP Bank Liga, 3 Hungarian Cup and 4 Hungarian League Cup)
Games won	17 (11 OTP Bank Liga, 3 Hungarian Cup and 3 Hungarian League Cup)
Games drawn	0 (0 OTP Bank Liga, 0 Hungarian Cup and 0 Hungarian League Cup)
Games lost	2 (1 OTP Bank Liga, 0 Hungarian Cup and 1 Hungarian League Cup)
Goals scored	59
Goals conceded	9
Goal difference	+50
Yellow cards	30
Red cards	2
Worst discipline	(Hungary) István Kovács (2 (yellow card) , 1 (red card) )
Worst discipline	(Portugal) Paulo Vinícius (4 (yellow card) , 0 (red card) )
Best result	8–0 (A) v Kunszállás – Magyar Kupa – 10-09-2014
Worst result	1–2 (H) v Debreceni – OTP Bank Liga – 19-10-2014
Worst result	0–1 (A) v Újpest – Ligakupa – 15-10-2014
Most appearances	(Portugal) Filipe Oliveira (18 appearances)
Top scorer	(Hungary) Nemanja Nikolić (13 goals)
Points	51/57 (89.47%)

Last updated: 26 October 2014

== Nemzeti Bajnokság I ==
=== Matches ===
26 July 2014 1	Videoton	3–0	Pápa	Székesfehérvár, Fejér County
18:30 CEST	Juhász 28', 63'; Nikolić 68' (pen.)	Report		Stadium: Stadion Sóstói; Attendance: 2,290; Referee: (Hungary) István Vad

2 August 2014 2	Videoton	3–0	Dunaújváros	Székesfehérvár, Fejér County
16:30 CEST	Oliveira 19'; Sándor 56'; Nikolić 62'	Report		Stadium: Sóstói Stadion; Attendance: 2,310; Referee: (Hungary) Tamás Bognár

9 August 2014 3	Videoton	3–2	Győr	Székesfehérvár, Fejér County
16:30 CEST	Wolfe 58' (o.g.); Juhász 75'; Nikolić 83'	Report	Pátkai 42'; Rudolf 65'	Stadium: Sóstói Stadion; Attendance: 3,645; Referee: (Hungary) Zoltán Iványi

16 August 2014 4	Nyíregyháza	0–2	Videoton	Nyíregyháza, Szabolcs-Szatmár-Bereg County
16:30 CEST		Report	Kovács 8'; Nikolić 77'	Stadium: Városi Stadion; Attendance: 2,744; Referee: (Hungary) Péter Solymosi

23 August 2014 5	Videoton	5–0	MTK	Székesfehérvár, Fejér County
18:30 CEST	Kovács 2', 27'; Gyurcsó 12'; Nikolić 55'; Feczesin 90+1'	Report		Stadium: Sóstói Stadion; Attendance: 2,880; Referee: (Hungary) Ádám Farkas

30 August 2014 6	Videoton	3–0	Puskás	Székesfehérvár, Fejér County
20:30 CEST	Gyurcsó 26'; Nikolić 69', 76'	Report		Stadium: Sóstói Stadion; Attendance: 3,085; Referee: (Hungary) Viktor Kassai

14 September 2014 7	Videoton	2–0	Újpest	Székesfehérvár, Fejér County
16:30 CEST	Juhász 38'; Nikolić 51'	Report		Stadium: Sóstói Stadion; Attendance: 4,650; Referee: (Hungary) Zoltán Iványi

20 September 2014 8	Haladás	0–2	Videoton	Szombathely, Vas County
18:30 CEST		Report	Nikolić 21', 33'	Stadium: Stadion Rohonci Út; Attendance: 2,120; Referee: (Hungary) Sándor Andó-Szabó

28 September 2014 9	Videoton	2–1	Diósgyőr	Székesfehérvár, Fejér County
16:30 CEST	Nikolić 54'; Alves 86' (o.g.)	Report	Grumić 81'	Stadium: Sóstói Stadion; Attendance: 5,522; Referee: (Hungary) Tamás Bognár

4 October 2014 10	Pécs	0–2	Videoton	Pécs, Baranya County
18:00 CEST		Report	Nikolić 37'; Čaušić 46' (o.g.)	Stadium: Stadion PMFC; Attendance: 800; Referee: (Hungary) István Vad

19 October 2014 11	Videoton	1–2	Debrecen	Székesfehérvár, Fejér County
16:30 CEST	Kovács 34'	Report	Kulcsár 27', 59'	Stadium: Sóstói Stadion; Attendance: 5,282; Referee: (Hungary) József Erdős

25 October 2014 12	Videoton	2–0	Paks	Székesfehérvár, Fejér County
20:00 CEST	Oliveira 56'; Nikolić 90+4'	Report		Stadium: Sóstói Stadion; Attendance: 1,883; Referee: (Hungary) Viktor Kassai

2 November 2014 13	Videoton	1–0	Honvéd	Székesfehérvár, Fejér County
18:30	Kovács 44'	Summary	Job (yellow card) 35'; Godoy (yellow card) 75'; Alcibiade (yellow card) 90'	Stadium: Stadion Sóstói; Attendance: 2,500; Referee: (Hungary) Istvan Vad

8 November 2014 14	Kecskemét	0–0	Videoton	Kecskemét, Bács-Kiskun County
14:00	Miklós Kitl (yellow card) 36'; Eninful (yellow card) 55'; Laczkó (yellow card) 71'; Patvaros (red card) 74'	Summary	Sándor (yellow card) 25'; Kovács (yellow card) 43'; Stopira (yellow card) 60'	Stadium: Széktói Stadion; Attendance: 1,882; Referee: (Hungary) Zoltan Ivanyi

23 November 2014 15	Ferencváros	0–0	Videoton	Budapest
16:30 CET	Szolnoki (yellow card) 11'; Marco Caneira (yellow card) 25'; Juhász (yellow card) 27'	Summary	Pavlović (yellow card) 33'; David Mateos (yellow card) 41'; Gera (yellow card) 77'	Stadium: Groupama Arena; Attendance: 3,500; Referee: (Hungary) Adam Farkas

29 November 2014 16	Pápa	0–5	Videoton	Pápa, Veszprém County
16:00 CET	Popin (yellow card) 17'; Bernardo Frizoni (yellow card) 66'; Kenesei (yellow card) 90+1'	Summary	Nikolić 9' 14'; Trebotić (yellow card) 40'; Gyurcsó 44'; Stopira 59'; Feczesin 69'; Juhász (yellow card) 82'; Szolnoki (yellow card) 83'	Stadium: Perutz Stadion; Attendance: 400; Referee: (Hungary) Sandor Ando-Szabo

6 December 2014 17	Dunaújváros FC	1–4	Videoton	Dunaújváros, Fejér County
16:00 CET	Böőr (yellow card) 15' (goal) 65' (pen.)	Summary	Nikolić 10'; Gyurcsó 29'; Alvarez 53'; Sándor (yellow card) 56' (yellow-red card); Marco Caneira (yellow card) 67'; Paulo Vinícius (yellow card) 67' (goal) 86'; Stopira (yellow card) 87' (yellow-red card)	Stadium: Dunaferr Arena; Attendance: 1,268; Referee: (Hungary) Istvan Vad II

1 March 2015 18	Győr	2-2	Videoton	Győr, Győr-Moson-Sopron County
16:30 CET	Windecker (yellow card) 19'; Koltai 45' (pen.); Priskin (yellow card) 56' (goal) 90+1'; Bucșa (yellow card) 90+3'	Summary	Filipe Oliveira (yellow card) 25'; Sofian Chakla (yellow card) 29'; Nikolić 31' (yellow card) 49'; Juhász 39'; Simon (yellow card) 45'; Fejes (yellow card) 79'; Szolnoki (yellow card) 89'; Calatayud (yellow card) 90'	Stadium: ETO Park; Attendance: 3,800; Referee: (Hungary) Adam Farkas

7 March 2015 19	Videoton	3-0	Nyíregyháza Spartacus	Székesfehérvár, Fejér County
18:30 CET	Paulo Vinícius 44'; Alvarez 70'; Nikolić 77' (pen.)	Summary	Szokol (yellow card) 43'; Arziani (yellow card) 49' (yellow-red card); Pákolicz (yellow card) 79'	Stadium: Sóstói Stadion; Attendance: 2,346; Referee: (Hungary) Ádám Németh

14 March 2015 20	MTK Budapest	0-1	Videoton	Budapest
14:00 CET	Vukmir (red card) 36'	Summary	Filipe Oliveira (yellow card) 45' (yellow-red card); Feczesin 78'	Stadium: Bozsik Stadion; Attendance: 1,200; Referee: (Hungary) Tamás Bognár

21 March 2015 21	Puskás Academy	0-0	Videoton	Felcsút, Fejér County
14:00 CET	Tóth (yellow card) 5'; Lencse (yellow card) 54'; Sallai (yellow card) 90'; Hajdúch (yellow card) 90+3'	Summary	Simon (yellow card) 47'; Paulo Vinícius (red card) 90+1'	Stadium: Pancho Arena; Attendance: 3,156; Referee: (Hungary) Ádám Németh

5 April 2015 22	Újpest	0-1	Videoton	Budapest
18:30 CET	Stanisavljević (yellow card) 32'; Ojo (yellow card) 85'	Summary	Juhász (yellow card) 25'; Filipe Oliveira 38'	Stadium: Ferenc Szusza Stadium; Attendance: 1,295; Referee: (Hungary) István Vad

12 April 2015 23	Videoton	7-0	Haladás	Székesfehérvár, Fejér County
18:30 CET	Nikolić 23'; Feczesin 53' 62'; Trebotić 70' 73'; Filipe Oliveira 86'; Fehér 88' (o.g.)	Summary	Martínez (red card) 36'; Alcibiade (yellow card) 45'; Iszlai (yellow card) 87'	Stadium: Sóstói Stadion; Attendance: 2,510; Referee: (Hungary) Adam Farkas

19 April 2015 24	Diósgyőr	1-2	Videoton	Miskolc, Borsod-Abaúj-Zemplén County
14:00 CET	Griffiths 90+3'	Summary	Szolnoki (yellow card) 42'; Filipe Oliveira 47'; Feczesin 58'	Stadium: DVTK Stadion; Attendance: 2,575; Referee: (Hungary) Zoltan Ivanyi

25 April 2015 25	Videoton	4-0	Pécsi MFC	Székesfehérvár, Fejér County
18:30 CET	Gyurcsó 25'; Filipe Oliveira 37'; Szolnoki (yellow card) 66'; Nikolić 74' 80'	Summary	Branko Ojdanić (yellow card) 77'; József Nagy (yellow card) 79'	Stadium: Sóstói Stadion; Attendance: 2,565; Referee: (Hungary) Peter Solymosi

2 May 2015 26	Debrecen	1-2	Videoton	Debrecen, Hajdú-Bihar County
14:00 CET	Máté (yellow card) 56'; Bódi (yellow card) 59' (goal) 81'; Jovanović (yellow card) 84'; Brković (yellow card) 90'	Summary	Feczesin (yellow card) 15' (goal) 54'; Szolnoki (yellow card) 23'; Gyurcsó 43'; Juhász (yellow card) 88'	Stadium: Nagyerdei Stadion; Attendance: 6,155; Referee: (Hungary) Zoltan Ivanyi

10 May 2015 27	Paks	1-0	Videoton	Paks, Tolna County
18:30 CET	Kecskés (yellow card) 36'; Könyves 80'; Kulcsár (yellow card) 90+1'	Summary	Simon (yellow card) 8'; Feczesin (yellow card) 43'	Stadium: Stadion PSE; Attendance: 1,853; Referee: (Hungary) Balazs Berke

16 May 2015 28	Honvéd	1-1	Videoton	Budapest
18:30 CET	Godoy (yellow card) 33'; Youla 69'; Baráth (yellow card) 72'; Gazdag (yellow card) 87'	Summary	Ivanovski 22' (yellow card) 72'; Maréval (yellow card) 90'; Trebotić (yellow card) 90'	Stadium: Bozsik Stadion; Attendance: 1,000; Referee: (Hungary) Ferenc Karakó

24 May 2015 29	Videoton	1-0	Kecskemét	Székesfehérvár, Fejér County
16:30 CET	Brachi (yellow card) 13'; Kovács (yellow card) 21'; Trebotić 29'; Alvarez (yellow card) 63'; Paulo Vinícius (yellow card) 89'	Summary	Farkas (yellow card) 40'; Eninful (yellow card) 43'; Szalai (yellow card) 56'; Karan (yellow card) 89'; Csillag (yellow card) 90'	Stadium: Sóstói Stadion; Attendance: 2,500; Referee: (Hungary) Fabian Mihaly

30 May 2015 30	Ferencváros	2-0	Videoton	Budapest
16:30 CET	Ramírez (yellow card) 28'; Böde 47'; Čukić 70'	Summary	Szolnoki (yellow card) 17'; Paulo Vinícius (yellow card) 45'; Brachi (yellow card) 51'	Stadium: Groupama Arena; Attendance: 6,087; Referee: (Hungary) Viktor Kassai

=== Classification ===
Pos	Team	Pld	W	D	L	GF	GA	GD	Pts	Qualification or relegation
1	Videoton (C)	30	22	5	3	64	14	+50	71	Qualification for Champions League second qualifying round
2	Ferencváros	30	19	7	4	49	19	+30	64	Qualification for Europa League first qualifying round
3	MTK	30	18	3	9	39	25	+14	57	Qualification for Europa League first qualifying round
4	Debrecen	30	15	9	6	44	19	+25	54	Qualification for Europa League first qualifying round
5	Paks	30	14	9	7	44	27	+17	51	

Source: mlsz.hu (in Hungarian)
Rules for classification: 1st points; 2nd overall wins; 3rd goal difference; 4th head-to-head points; 5th head-to-head goal difference; 6th head-to-head away goals scored; 7th fair-play points; 8th drawing of lots
(C) Champions

=== Results summary ===
Overall								Home						Away					
Pld	W	D	L	GF	GA	GD	Pts	W	D	L	GF	GA	GD	W	D	L	GF	GA	GD
30	22	5	3	64	14	+50	71	13	1	1	40	5	+35	9	4	2	24	9	+15

Last updated: 30 May 2015.
Source: NB1

=== Results by round ===
Round	1	2	3	4	5	6	7	8	9	10	11	12	13	14	15	16	17	18	19	20	21	22	23	24	25	26	27	28	29	30
Ground	H	H	H	A	H	H	H	A	H	A	H	H	H	A	H	A	A	A	H	A	A	A	H	A	H	A	A	A	H	A
Result	W	W	W	W	W	W	W	W	W	W	L	W	W	D	D	W	W	D	W	W	D	W	W	W	W	W	L	D	W	L
Position	2	1	1	1	1	1	1	1	1	1	1	1	1	1	1	1	1	1	1	1	1	1	1	1	1	1	1	1	1	1

Updated to match(es) played on 30 May 2015. Source: Matches
A = Away; H = Home; W = Win; D = Draw; L = Loss

== Hungarian Cup ==
13 August 2014 Round 1	Testvériség	0–7	Videoton	Budapest, Pest County
17:00 CEST		Report	Oliveira 21'; Alvarez 25'; Chakla 44'; Caneira 59'; Vallejos 73'; Feczesin 81', 85'	Stadium: Testvériség Sporttelep; Attendance: 250; Referee: (Hungary) József Ducsai

10 September 2014 Round 2	Kunszállás	0–8	Videoton	Kunszállás, Bács-Kiskun County
15:30 CEST		Report	Nagy 19'; Feczesin 22', 82', 88' (pen.); Trebotić 26'; Pajač 27', 61'; Chakla 79'	Stadium: Városi Sporttelep; Attendance: 500; Referee: (Hungary) Bence Csonka

23 September 2014 Round 3	Szigetszentmiklós	1–2	Videoton	Szigetszentmiklós, Pest County
15:00 CEST	Hevesi-Tóth 10'	Report	Feczesin 47'; Fejes 78'	Stadium: Stadium Sport Street; Attendance: 600; Referee: (Hungary) Róbert Nagy

28 October 2014 Last 16	Videoton	2–1	Diósgyőr	Székesfehérvár, Fejér County
17:30 CEST	Debreceni 22' (o.g.); Juhász (yellow card) 28'; Kovács (yellow card) 78'; Nikolić 86'	Summary	Grumić (yellow card) 37'; Gosztonyi (yellow card) 44'; Griffiths 64'	Stadium: Sóstói Stadion; Attendance: 1,500; Referee: (Hungary) Zoltan Ivanyi

4 March 2015 Quarter-finals 1st Leg	Videoton	2-1	Pécsi MFC	Székesfehérvár, Fejér County
18:00 CET	Paulo Vinícius (yellow card) 38'; Feczesin 67' (yellow card) 89'; Sándor (yellow card) 85'; Maréval (yellow card) 86'; Alvarez 90+5'	Summary	Frőhlich 44'; Róbert Kővári (yellow card) 62'; James (yellow card) 78'; Tadejević (yellow card) 90+2'; Branko Ojdanić (yellow card) 90+4'	Stadium: Sóstói Stadion; Referee: (Hungary) Istvan Vad

1 April 2015 Quarter-finals 2nd Leg	Pécsi MFC	0-3 (1-5 agg.)	Videoton	Pécs, Baranya County
18:00 CET	Márkvárt (red card) 68'	Summary	Feczesin 12' (pen.); Maréval (yellow card) 15'; Simon (yellow card) 54'; Ivanovski 59'; Pajač (red card) 63'; Paulo Vinícius (yellow card) 77'; Trebotić 85'; Szolnoki (yellow card) 89'	Stadium: Stadion PMFC; Referee: (Hungary) Zoltan Ivanyi

8 April 2015 Semi-finals 1st Leg	Videoton	1-0	Újpest	Székesfehérvár, Fejér County
18:00 CET	Gyurcsó 43'; Trebotić (yellow card) 54'; Filipe Oliveira (yellow card) 90'; Álvaro Brachi (yellow card) 90+4'	Summary	Suljić (yellow card) 42'; Andrić (yellow card) 42'; Nego (yellow card) 52'	Stadium: Sóstói Stadion; Referee: (Hungary) Csaba Pinter

28 April 2015 Semi-finals 2nd Leg	Újpest	1-4 (1-5 agg.)	Videoton	Budapest
18:00 CET	Nego (yellow card) 30'; Litauszki 39'; Balajcza (yellow card) 57'; Ojo (yellow card) 71'	Summary	Nikolić 23' 71'; Juhász (yellow card) 28'; Feczesin 88'; Filipe Oliveira 90+3'	Stadium: Ferenc Szusza Stadium; Attendance: 1,000; Referee: (Hungary) Zsolt Szabó

20 May 2015 Final	Videoton	0-4	Ferencváros	Budapest
20:00 CET	Filipe Oliveira (yellow card) 33'; Juhász (yellow card) 45'; Calatayud (yellow card) 61'	Summary	Batik (yellow card) 13' (goal) 60'; Varga 54'; Gera (yellow card) 67'; Lamah 70'; Szolnoki 87' (o.g.)	Stadium: Groupama Arena; Attendance: 15,525; Referee: (Hungary) Zoltan Ivanyi

== League Cup ==
2 September 2014 1	Videoton	4–0	Ajka	Székesfehérvár, Fejér County
18:00 CEST	Sejben 26'; Feczesin 34', 65'; Ács 88'	Report		Stadium: Stadion Sóstói; Attendance: 800; Referee: (Hungary) Attila Molnár

16 September 2014 2	Videoton	5–1	Vasas	Székesfehérvár, Fejér County
19:00 CEST	Oliveira 28', 43'; Kékesi 57' (o.g.); Kovács 79'; Feczesin 87'	Report	Ádám 20'	Stadium: Stadion Sóstói; Attendance: 921; Referee: (Hungary) Szabolcs Szilasi

7 October 2014 3	Videoton	3–1	Újpest	Székesfehérvár, Fejér County
18:00 CEST	Feczesin 15' (pen.), 73' (pen.); Alvarez 45'	Report	Stanisavljević 58'	Stadium: Sóstói Stadion; Attendance: 1,000; Referee: (Hungary) Gábor Oláh

15 October 2014 4	Újpest	1–0	Videoton	Budapest, Pest County
18:00 CEST	Tsveiba 90+2'	Report		Stadium: Szusza Ferenc Stadium; Attendance: 300; Referee: (Hungary) Balázs Berke

Pos	Team	Pld	W	D	L	GF	GA	GD	Pts	Qualification	VID	ÚJP	VAS	AJK
1	Videoton	6	4	1	1	18	5	+13	13	Advance to knockout phase	—	3–1	5–1	4–0
2	Újpest	6	4	1	1	14	8	+6	13	Advance to knockout phase	1–0	—	2–1	4–1
3	Vasas	6	2	1	3	10	13	−3	7		1–1	1–4	—	2–1
4	Ajka	6	0	1	5	5	21	−16	1		1–5	2–2	0–4	—

Source: Soccerway
Legend: Blue = home team win; Yellow = draw; Red = away team win.
