= Oussou =

Oussou is a given name and a surname. Notable people with the name include:

- Oussou Konan Anicet (1989–2022), Ivorian footballer
- Sidoine Oussou (born 1992), Beninese footballer
