= Eliomar (footballer, born 1988) =

Brazilian footballer

Personal information
- Full name: Eliomar Correia Silva
- Date of birth: 16 March 1988 (age 38)
- Place of birth: Salvador, Brazil
- Height: 1.75 m (5 ft 9 in)
- Position: Attacking midfielder

Youth career
- Vitória

Senior career*
Years	Team	Apps	(Gls)
2008	Cardoso Moreira	0	(0)
2008–2012	Javor Ivanjica	95	(11)
2013–2015	Partizan	7	(0)
2013–2014	→ Kecskemét (loan)	8	(2)
2014–2015	→ Pierikos (loan)	11	(1)
2015	→ AEL (loan)	19	(3)
2015	→ Javor Ivanjica (loan)	17	(1)
2016–2018	Javor Ivanjica	64	(5)
2018–2019	Široki Brijeg	20	(2)
2019–2020	Mladost Lučani	22	(4)
2020	Inđija	13	(1)
2021	Zlatibor Čajetina	8	(0)
2021–2025	Javor Ivanjica	87	(4)
- * Club domestic league appearances and goals as of 27 June 2025

Eliomar Correia Silva (born 16 March 1988) is a Brazilian professional footballer who plays as an attacking midfielder.

== Career ==
Born in Salvador, Eliomar started out at his hometown club Vitória. He would later move to different state to start his senior career with Cardoso Moreira. During the 2008 Campeonato Carioca, Eliomar made eight appearances in the process, as the team suffered relegation to the second level of football in Rio de Janeiro.

In August 2008, Eliomar moved abroad to Serbian club Javor Ivanjica. He made his league debut for the side in a 2–2 away draw against Partizan on 18 October 2008. In the heights of his spell in Ivanjica, Eliomar netted a hat-trick to give his team a 3–1 over OFK Beograd on 29 September 2012. He amassed a total of 95 league appearances and scored 11 goals for Javor in the top flight of Serbian football.

On 17 January 2013, Eliomar was transferred to Partizan. He signed a three-and-a-half-year contract and was given the number 10 shirt. On 2 March 2013, Eliomar made his competitive debut for the club in their 2–0 home league win over Donji Srem. He appeared in six more league games until the end of the 2012–13 season, as Partizan won the title.

On 15 July 2013, Eliomar joined Hungarian side Kecskemét on a season-long loan. He collected 16 appearances across all competitions over the course of the 2013–14 campaign, scoring three goals. In the summer of 2014, Eliomar went to Greece on loan to Pierikos, but switched to fellow Football League club AEL midway through the 2014–15 season.

== Career statistics ==
As of 6 October 2021

Appearances and goals by club, season and competition
Club	Season	League			National cup		League cup		Continental		Total	
Club	Season	Division	Apps	Goals	Apps	Goals	Apps	Goals	Apps	Goals	Apps	Goals
Javor Ivanjica	2008–09	Serbian SuperLiga	13	0			—		—		13	0
Javor Ivanjica	2009–10	Serbian SuperLiga	14	1	1	0	—		—		15	1
Javor Ivanjica	2010–11	Serbian SuperLiga	29	2	1	1	—		—		30	3
Javor Ivanjica	2011–12	Serbian SuperLiga	24	1	3	0	—		—		27	1
Javor Ivanjica	2012–13	Serbian SuperLiga	15	7	3	0	—		—		18	7
Javor Ivanjica	Total		95	11	8	1	—		—		103	12
Partizan	2012–13	Serbian SuperLiga	7	0	0	0	—		0	0	7	0
Kecskemét (loan)	2013–14	Nemzeti Bajnokság I	8	2	3	0	5	1	—		16	3
Pierikos (loan)	2014–15	Football League Greece	11	1	2	0	—		—		13	1
AEL (loan)	2014–15	Football League Greece	19	3	0	0	—		—		19	3
Javor Ivanjica	2015–16	Serbian SuperLiga	27	1	4	1	—		—		31	2
Javor Ivanjica	2016–17	Serbian SuperLiga	26	4	0	0	—		—		26	4
Javor Ivanjica	2017–18	Serbian SuperLiga	28	1	1	0	—		—		29	1
Javor Ivanjica	Total		81	6	5	1	—		—		86	7
Široki Brijeg	2018–19	Bosnian Premier League	20	2	5	0	—		2	0	27	2
Mladost Lučani	2019–20	Serbian SuperLiga	22	4	0	0	—		—		22	4
Inđija	2020–21	Serbian SuperLiga	13	1	1	0	—		—		14	1
Zlatibor Čajetina	2020–21	Serbian SuperLiga	8	0	0	0	—		—		8	0
Career total			284	30	24	2	5	1	2	0	315	33

== Honours ==
Partizan

- Serbian SuperLiga: 2012–13
