= Jorginho (footballer, born 1985) =

Brazilian footballer

Personal information
- Full name: Jorge Pereira da Silva
- Date of birth: 4 December 1985 (age 40)
- Place of birth: São Paulo, Brazil
- Height: 1.78 m (5 ft 10 in)
- Position: Striker

Youth career
- 1998–2003: Bahia

Senior career*
Years	Team	Apps	(Gls)
2004	Nagoya Grampus Eight	8	(2)
2005	Sanfrecce Hiroshima	4	(0)
2006	Tokushima Vortis	34	(8)
2007	FC Gifu	29	(12)
2007–2008	Bahia	10	(2)
2008–2009	Mixto	16	(8)
2009	Águia Negra	18	(8)
2009–2011	Al-Mabarrah	40	(18)
2011–2012	Qormi	29	(19)
2012–2013	Kecskeméti TE	14	(8)
2013–2014	Qormi	14	(6)
2014–2017	Hibernians	34	(25)
2017–2018	Al-Khaleej	1	(1)
2018–2019	Gżira United	8	(1)
2019–2020	Birkirkara	10	(2)
- * Club domestic league appearances and goals

Jorge Pereira da Silva (born 4 December 1985), better known as Jorginho, is a Brazilian former football player who played as a striker. He is the brother of prolific Brazilian striker Ueslei.

== Career ==
Jorginho was born in Bahia, where he started his career at the age of 13 playing at the youth level for Bahia (Div 1 Brazilian team) from 1998 to 2003.

In 2004, Jorginho was transferred to the Japanese market to play in the biggest league of the country the J1 League. In Japan, he built a spectacular career, joining big teams such as Nagoya Grampus Eight and Sanfrecce Hiroshima both Japanese Div 1 teams. Jorginho also played for Tokushima Vortis and FC GIFU during his stay in Japan.

In 2008 Jorginho comes back to his original country to play the Brazilian Div. 1 State Championships for teams such as Mixto Esporte Clube, EC Bahia, and EC Aguia Negra where he’d keep his performance of 0.5 goals per game. In 2009, Jorginho goes abroad once more to confirm his football. He joined Al-Mabarrah, Lebanese Premier League team that disputes important competitions such as FA Cup and Arab Champions League.

Jorginho’s also played for Qormi FC Premier League team that competes in the Maltese Premier League.

In 2012, he signed to Kecskeméti TE.

For the 2014–15 season, he joined Hibernians, and proved to be one of the most lethal strikers in the Maltese Premier League. He led Hibernians to the league title and jointly topped the scoring charts with teammate and strike partner Edison Luiz dos Santos. This helped qualify them for the second qualifying round of the 2015–16 UEFA Champions League

Jorginho joined Gzira United F.C. in 2018. He scored on his debut against UE Sant Julià in the UEFA Europa League. On 8 January 2019, he signed with Birkirkara FC.

== Club statistics ==
Club performance			League		Cup		League Cup		Total	
Season	Club	League	Apps	Goals	Apps	Goals	Apps	Goals	Apps	Goals
Japan			League		Emperor's Cup		J.League Cup		Total	
2004	Nagoya Grampus Eight	J1 League	8	2	0	0	2	0	10	2
2005	Sanfrecce Hiroshima	J1 League	4	0	0	0	1	0	5	0
2006	Tokushima Vortis	J2 League	34	8	0	0	-		34	8
2007	FC Gifu	Football League	27	8	2	0	-		29	8
Total			73	18	2	0	3	0	78	18
