= Boris Bulajić =

Montenegrin footballer

Personal information
- Full name: Boris Bulajić
- Date of birth: 27 April 1988 (age 38)
- Place of birth: Nikšić, SFR Yugoslavia
- Height: 1.83 m (6 ft 0 in)
- Position: Midfielder

Senior career*
Years	Team	Apps	(Gls)
2006–2011	Sutjeska	91	(4)
2011–2013	Čelik Nikšić	70	(5)
2013–2014	Kecskemét	9	(1)
2014–2015	Rudar Pljevlja	3	(0)
2015	Grbalj	4	(0)
2015	Sutjeska	3	(0)
2016	Borac Čačak		
2016–2018	Iskra Danilovgrad	51	(1)

International career^{‡}
2009–2011	Montenegro U-21	6	(0)
- * Club domestic league appearances and goals as of 11 October 2015 ‡ National team caps and goals as of 10 August 2011

Boris Bulajić (Cyrillic: Борис Булајић, born 27 April 1988) is a Montenegrin footballer, who plays for Borac Čačak.
