= Konrád Verebélyi =

Hungarian footballer

Personal information
- Full name: Konrád Verebélyi
- Date of birth: 11 December 1995 (age 30)
- Place of birth: Szentes, Hungary
- Height: 1.88 m (6 ft 2 in)
- Position: Goalkeeper

Team information
- Current team: Kecskemét
- Number: 95

Youth career
- 2009–2013: Kecskemét
- 2013: Honvéd

Senior career*
Years	Team	Apps	(Gls)
2013–	Kecskemét	1	(0)
- * Club domestic league appearances and goals as of 1 June 2014

Konrád Verebélyi (born 11 December 1995) is a Hungarian professional footballer who plays for Kecskeméti TE.
