= Darko Pavićević =

Montenegrin footballer

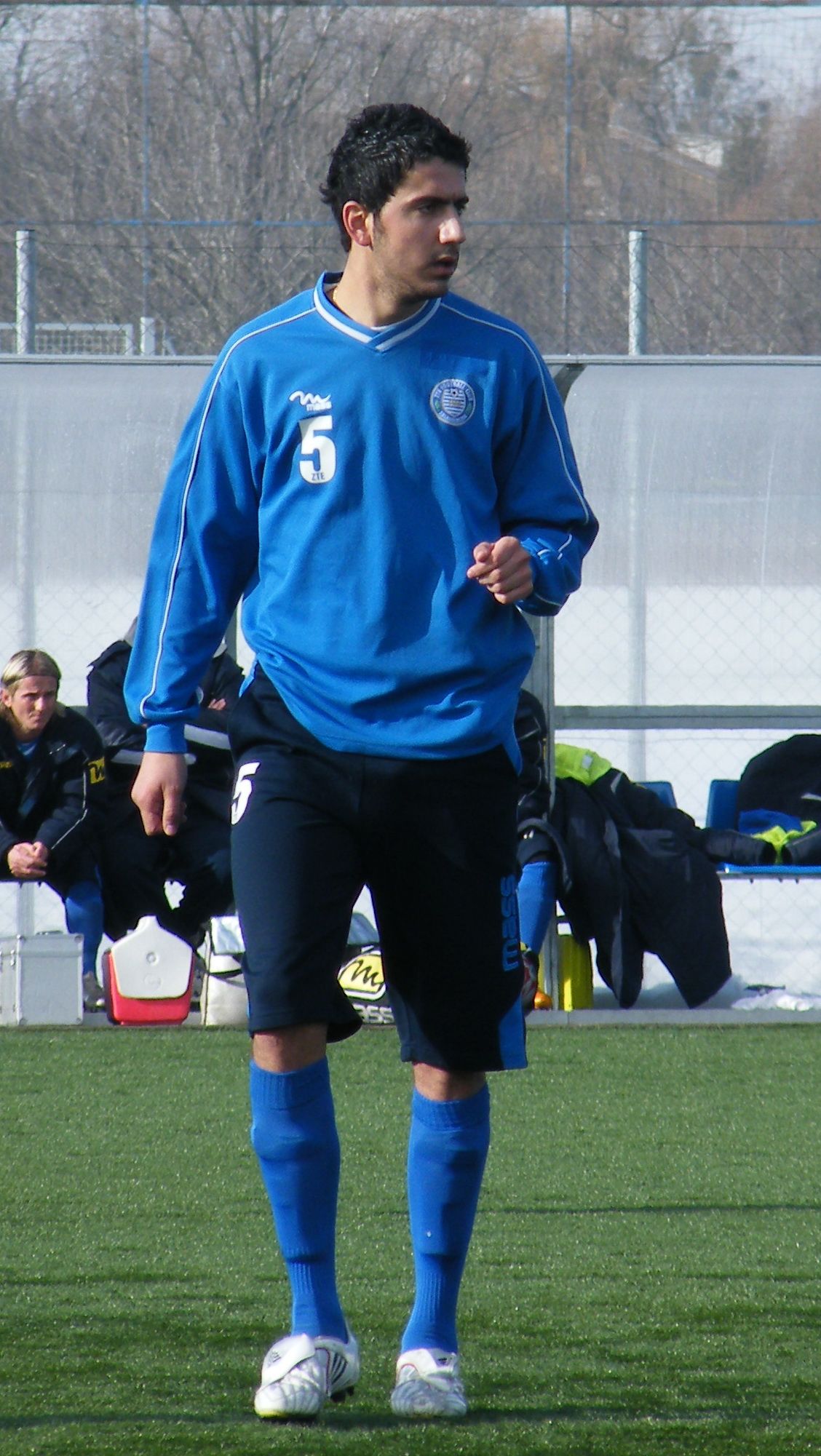

Personal information
- Full name: Darko Pavićević
- Date of birth: 27 December 1986 (age 39)
- Place of birth: Podgorica, SFR Yugoslavia
- Height: 1.98 m (6 ft 6 in)
- Position: Striker

Youth career
- 2004–2006: Budućnost Podgorica

Senior career*
Years	Team	Apps	(Gls)
2006–2007	Mladost Podgorica	12	(1)
2007–2008	Grbalj	27	(4)
2008–2013	Zalaegerszeg	90	(47)
2014	Kecskeméti	13	(2)
2015	Vllaznia Shkodër	6	(1)
2016	FC Deutschkreutz	8	(1)
Total		156	(56)
- * Club domestic league appearances and goals as of 7 October 2015

Darko Pavićević (born 27 December 1986) is a Montenegrin footballer.

== Club career ==
A big striker, Pavićević played in Hungary and for Vllaznia Shkodër in the Albanian Superliga.

He left Austrian lower league side FC Deutschkreutz in October 2016 for private reasons, just after scoring his first goal for the club.
