= Kunszállás =

Coordinates: 46°46′N 19°45′E

- Interactive map of Kunszállás
- Country: Hungary
- County: Bács-Kiskun

Area
  - Total: 20.85 km^{2} (8.05 sq mi)

Population (2015)
  - Total: 1,691
  - Density: 83/km^{2} (210/sq mi)
- Time zone: UTC+1 (CET)
  - Summer (DST): UTC+2 (CEST)
- Postal code: 6115
- Area code: 76

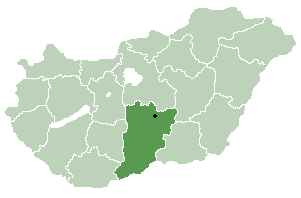
Location of Bács-Kiskun county in Hungary

Kunszállás is a village in Bács-Kiskun county, in the Southern Great Plain region of Hungary.

== Geography ==
It covers an area of 20.85 km^{2} (8 sq mi) and has a population of 1691 people (2015).
