= Dárius Csillag =

Hungarian footballer

Personal information
- Date of birth: 29 January 1995 (age 31)
- Place of birth: Gyöngyös, Hungary
- Height: 1.88 m (6 ft 2 in)
- Position: Forward

Team information
- Current team: Budaörs
- Number: 7

Youth career
- Tarnamérai KSZSE
- Hevesi DC
- Jászapáti VSE
- Hevesi LSC
- 2009–2013: Budapest Honvéd

Senior career*
Years	Team	Apps	(Gls)
2013–2015	Kecskemét	4	(0)
2015–2017	Budaörs	53	(9)
2017–2018	Soroksár	15	(0)
2018–2019	Vác	29	(6)
2019–2022	Dorogi	50	(3)
2022–	Budaörs	9	(0)
- * Club domestic league appearances and goals as of 1 May 2022

Dárius Csillag (born 29 January 1995) is a Hungarian professional footballer who plays for Budaörs.

== Club statistics ==
Appearances and goals by club, season and competition
Club	Season	League			Cup		League Cup		Europe		Total	
Club	Season	Division	Apps	Goals	Apps	Goals	Apps	Goals	Apps	Goals	Apps	Goals
Kecskemét	2013–14	Nemzeti Bajnokság I	2	0	1	0	5	0	0	0	8	0
Kecskemét	2014–15	Nemzeti Bajnokság I	1	0	0	0	3	0	0	0	4	0
Career total			3	0	1	0	8	0	0	0	12	0

Updated to games played as of 15 October 2014.
