= Edgardo Díaz (footballer) =

Argentine footballer

Personal information
- Full name: Edgardo Baudilio Díaz Del Valle
- Date of birth: January 19, 1988 (age 38)
- Place of birth: San Juan, Argentina
- Height: 1.83 m (6 ft 0 in)
- Position: Left back

Team information
- Current team: Club Deportivo Rincón

Senior career*
Years	Team	Apps	(Gls)
2008–2010	Central Córdoba	16	(1)
2010	Atlético Trinidad	22	(10)
2011	Blooming		
2011	Unión Temuco	13	(2)
2012	Deportes Naval	19	(5)
2012–2013	Gimnasia y Esgrima	8	(0)
2013	Kecskeméti TE	4	(0)
2013–2014	Unión Villa Krause	19	(0)
2014	San Martín Tucumán	10	(0)
2015	Deportivo Maipú	10	(1)
2016–2018	Chaco For Ever	44	(1)
2018–2019	Juventud Unida	21	(1)
2019–2020	Güemes	4	(0)
2020–21	Deportivo Maipú	35	(0)
2022	Sportivo Las Parejas	22	(0)
2023–2024	Ciudad Bolívar	44	(3)
2025	Argentino de Monte Maíz	7	(0)
2025–	Club Deportivo Rincón	8	(0)
- * Club domestic league appearances and goals as of 15:15, 07 January 2026 (UTC)

Edgardo Baudilio Díaz Del Valle (born October 20, 1988, in San Juan, Argentina) is an Argentine footballer playing for Club Deportivo Rincón in the Torneo Federal A of Argentina.

== Career ==
He started out with Club Atlético San Martín (San Juan) of the Primera B Nacional in 2008. After two seasons he was recruited by Atlético Trinidad. He played there for one year before migrating to Chile in 2011, where he joined Unión Temuco for a brief spell. In June of that year, he signed for Bolivian first division club Blooming. He played than with Chilean club Deportes Naval and signed with an breakpoint by Club Gimnasia y Esgrima La Plata, for Hungarian side in early 2013 Kecskeméti TE. Diaz played until 30 May 2013 in only four games for Kecskeméti TE, before returned to Argentine, to sign for Club Atlético Unión (Villa Krause).
