= Sidoine Oussou =

Beninese association football player

Personal information
- Date of birth: 14 November 1992 (age 33)
- Place of birth: Cotonou, Benin
- Height: 1.76 m (5 ft 9 in)
- Position: Striker

Senior career*
Years	Team	Apps	(Gls)
2009–2011	ASPAC		
2011–2014	Vålerenga	2	(0)
2012	→ Visé (loan)	0	(0)
2013	→ Kecskeméti (loan)	2	(1)
2015–2016	Naxxar Lions	10	(1)
2016	Beauvais	3	(0)

International career
2011–2012	Benin	3	(0)
- * Club domestic league appearances and goals

Sidoine Oussou (born 14 November 1992) is a Beninese former professional footballer who played as a striker. In 2011 and 2012, he made three appearances for the Benin national team.

== Club career ==
After playing club football for Beninese club ASPAC Oussou moved to Europe joining Vålerenga in January 2011. After playing two matches for Vålerenga in the 2011 Norwegian Premier League, his chances in 2012 were limited to the reserve team in the Norwegian Second Division. Oussou was in August 2012 sent on a season-long loan-deal to the Belgium club Cercle Sportif Visé. On 24 July 2013, Oussou signed a one-year loan contract with Kecskeméti TE.

== International career ==
Oussou made his international debut for Benin in 2011.

== Career statistics ==
Appearances and goals by club, season and competition
Club	Season	League			Cup		Total	
Club	Season	Division	Apps	Goals	Apps	Goals	Apps	Goals
Vålerenga	2011	Tippeligaen	2	0	0	0	2	0
Vålerenga	2012	Tippeligaen	0	0	0	0	0	0
Vålerenga	2013	Tippeligaen	0	0	0	0	0	0
Kecskeméti	2013–14	NB I	2	1	2	0	4	1
Naxxar Lions	2015–16	Maltese Premier League	10	1	0	0	10	1
Beauvais	2015–16	CFA 2	3	0	0	0	3	0
Career total			17	2	2	0	19	2
