= Marko Vukasović =

Montenegrin footballer

Personal information
- Date of birth: 10 September 1990 (age 36)
- Place of birth: Cetinje, SFR Yugoslavia
- Height: 1.78 m (5 ft 10 in)
- Position: Defensive midfielder

Team information
- Current team: Mosonmagyaróvár
- Number: 14

Senior career*
Years	Team	Apps	(Gls)
2008–2011	Veternik	42	(3)
2011–2013	Proleter Novi Sad	43	(2)
2013–2015	Kecskemét	62	(3)
2015–2016	Vasas	15	(0)
2016	Chikhura	6	(0)
2016–2018	Vojvodina	46	(0)
2018–2019	Győr	49	(3)
2020–2021	Csákvár	17	(0)
2021	Győr	8	(0)
2021–2022	Proleter Novi Sad	30	(2)
2022–2023	Novi Sad	16	(0)
2023–	Mosonmagyaróvár	28	(0)
- * Club domestic league appearances and goals as of 21 December 2023

Marko Vukasović (born 10 September 1990) is a Montenegrin footballer who plays for Hungarian club Mosonmagyaróvár.

He is the older brother of Mladen Vukasović.
