= Tarabai (footballer) =

Brazilian footballer

Personal information
- Full name: Edison Luiz dos Santos
- Date of birth: 9 December 1985 (age 40)
- Place of birth: Osasco, Brazil
- Height: 1.69 m (5 ft 6 1/2 in)
- Position: Forward

Senior career*
Years	Team	Apps	(Gls)
2007	Oeste Paulista		
2008	Galo Maringá		
2008–2009	Marcílio Dias		
2009–2010	Rio Preto (SP)	13	(3)
2010–2011	Vittoriosa Srars	17	(6)
2011–2012	Hibernians	30	(22)
2012	Kecskeméti TE	11	(1)
2013–2018	Hibernians	68	(54)
2015	→ Seoul E-Land (loan)	34	(17)
2016	→ Seoul E-Land (loan)	38	(12)
2017–2018	→ Al-Batin (loan)	26	(7)
2018–2019	Al-Raed	8	(3)
2019	Al-Shoulla	4	(0)
2019–2020	Birkirkara	6	(2)
2020	Hibernians	3	(0)
- * Club domestic league appearances and goals as of 23:05, 24 December 2020 (UTC)

Edison Luiz dos Santos (born 9 December 1985 in Osasco), also known as Tarabai, is a Brazilian football player who plays as a forward.

== Career statistics ==
As of 30 October 2016.

Club	Season	League			National Cup		Continental		Other		Total	
Club	Season	Division	Apps	Goals	Apps	Goals	Apps	Goals	Apps	Goals	Apps	Goals
Rio Preto (SP)	2010	Paulista A2	13	3	0	0	—				13	3
Rio Preto (SP)	Total		13	3	0	0	—|				13	3
Vittoriosa Stars	2010–11	Maltese First Division	17	6	3	1	—				20	7
Vittoriosa Stars	Total		17	6	3	1	—				20	7
Hibernians	2011–12	Maltese First Division	30	22	4	4	—				34	26
Hibernians	2012–13	Maltese First Division	8	6	2	3	0	0	1	0	11	9
Hibernians	2013–14	Maltese First Division	29	21	2	1	2	0	1	0	34	22
Hibernians	2014–15	Maltese First Division	25	25	3	2	0	0	—		28	27
Hibernians	2015–16	Maltese First Division	6	2	0	0	0	0	—		6	2
Hibernians	Total		98	76	11	10	2	0	2	0	113	86
Kecskeméti TE	2012–13	Nemzeti Bajnokság I	11	1	5	0	—				16	1
Kecskeméti TE	Total		11	1	5	0	—				16	1
Seoul E-Land (loan)	2015	K League Challenge	34	17	1	0	—		1	1	36	18
Seoul E-Land (loan)	2016	K League Challenge	38	12	2	3	—				40	15
Seoul E-Land (loan)	Total		72	29	3	3	—		1	1	76	33
Career total			211	115	22	14	2	0	3	1	238	130

Note: "Other" includes Maltese First Division title decider (2012–13), Maltese Super Cup (2013–14), and K League Challenge promotion play-offs (2015).
