= Givi Ioseliani =

Georgian footballer

Personal information
- Full name: Givi Ioseliani
- Date of birth: 25 October 1990 (age 36)
- Place of birth: Tbilisi, Georgia
- Height: 1.80 m (5 ft 11 in)
- Position: Midfielder

Team information
- Current team: Samtredia
- Number: 20

Senior career*
Years	Team	Apps	(Gls)
2011–2013	Torpedo Kutaisi	29	(0)
2013	Kecskemét	4	(0)
2013–2014	Sioni Bolnisi	2	(0)
2014–2015	Spartaki Tskhinvali	27	(0)
2015	Torpedo Kutaisi	8	(0)
2015–2016	Samtredia	17	(3)
2016	Zugdidi	7	(0)
2017	Spartaki Tskhinvali	13	(1)
2017	Meshakhte Tkibuli	7	(0)
2018	FC Telavi	26	(1)
2019	Tskhinvali	2	(0)
2020	Samgurali	0	(0)
2021–	Samtredia	68	(3)

International career
2011–2013	Georgia U-21	9	(0)
- * Club domestic league appearances and goals as of 3 December 2023

Givi Ioseliani (born 25 October 1990 in Tbilisi) is a Georgian football player who currently plays for Samtredia.

== Club statistics ==
Club	Season	League		Cup		League Cup		Europe		Total	
Club	Season	Apps	Goals	Apps	Goals	Apps	Goals	Apps	Goals	Apps	Goals
Kutaisi	2011–12	29	0	5	4	0	0	0	0	34	4
Kutaisi	2012–13	0	0	0	0	0	0	1	0	1	0
Kutaisi	Total	29	0	5	4	0	0	1	0	35	4
Kecskemét	2012–13	4	0	0	0	0	0	0	0	4	0
Kecskemét	Total	4	0	0	0	0	0	0	0	4	0
Career total		33	0	5	4	0	0	1	0	39	4

Updated to games played as of 12 May 2013.

== Sources ==
- MLSZ (in Hungarian)
- Givi Ioseliani at Soccerway (archived)
