= András Farkas =

Hungarian footballer

Personal information
- Date of birth: 3 December 1992 (age 33)
- Place of birth: Kecskemét, Hungary
- Height: 1.83 m (6 ft 0 in)
- Position: Defender

Youth career
- 2002–2011: Kecskemét

Senior career*
Years	Team	Apps	(Gls)
2011–2015	Kecskemét	15	(0)
2013	→ Baja (loan)	15	(0)
2015–2019	Ceglédi	102	(3)
2019–2021	Kazincbarcikai	53	(1)
2021–2023	Tiszakécske	41	(0)
- * Club domestic league appearances and goals as of 31 May 2023

András Farkas (born 3 December 1992) is a Hungarian professional footballer.

== Career statistics ==
Appearances and goals by club, season and competition
Club	Season	League			Cup		League Cup		Europe		Total	
Club	Season	Division	Apps	Goals	Apps	Goals	Apps	Goals	Apps	Goals	Apps	Goals
Kecskemét
Kecskemét	2009–10	Nemzeti Bajnokság I	0	0	2	0	1	0	0	0	3	0
Kecskemét	2010–11	Nemzeti Bajnokság I	1	0	0	0	3	0	0	0	4	0
Kecskemét	2011–12	Nemzeti Bajnokság I	0	0	2	0	4	0	0	0	6	0
Kecskemét	2013–14	Nemzeti Bajnokság I	9	0	2	0	6	0	0	0	17	0
Kecskemét	2014–15	Nemzeti Bajnokság I	2	0	3	0	6	0	0	0	11	0
Kecskemét	Total		12	0	9	0	20	0	0	0	41	0
Baja	2012–13	Nemzeti Bajnokság I	15	0	1	0	0	0	0	0	16	0
Career total			27	0	10	0	20	0	0	0	57	0

Updated to games played as of 18 November 2014.
