= Zsolt Patvaros =

Hungarian footballer

Personal information
- Full name: Zsolt Patvaros
- Date of birth: 18 February 1993 (age 33)
- Place of birth: Kecskemét, Hungary
- Height: 1.85 m (6 ft 1 in)
- Position: Midfielder

Youth career
- 2007–2010: Kecskemét

Senior career*
Years	Team	Apps	(Gls)
2010–2015	Kecskemét	64	(1)
2015–2018	Zalaegerszeg	69	(2)
2018–2019	Balmazújváros	26	(0)
2019–2020	Kecskemét	10	(6)
2020	Nyíregyháza Spartacus	3	(0)

International career
2011–2012	Hungary U19	7	(0)
2012–2013	Hungary U21	2	(0)
- * Club domestic league appearances and goals as of 21:52, 23 September 2020 (UTC)

Zsolt Patvaros (born 18 February 1993) is a Hungarian football player.

== Club statistics ==
Appearances and goals by club, season and competition
Club	Season	League		Cup		League Cup		Europe		Total	
Club	Season	Apps	Goals	Apps	Goals	Apps	Goals	Apps	Goals	Apps	Goals
Kecskemét
Kecskemét	2010–11	3	0	2	0	3	0	0	0	8	0
Kecskemét	2011–12	5	0	4	0	6	0	–	–	15	0
Kecskemét	2012–13	15	1	0	0	3	0	–	–	18	1
Kecskemét	2013–14	25	0	2	0	3	0	–	–	30	0
Kecskemét	2014–15	16	0	2	0	5	0	–	–	23	0
Kecskemét	Total	64	1	10	0	20	0	0	0	94	1
Zalaegerszeg
Zalaegerszeg	2015–16	25	0	4	1	–	–	–	–	29	1
Zalaegerszeg	2016–17	22	2	0	0	–	–	–	–	22	2
Zalaegerszeg	2017–18	22	0	5	0	–	–	–	–	27	0
Zalaegerszeg	Total	69	2	9	1	–	–	–	–	78	3
Balmazújváros
Balmazújváros	2018–19	26	0	1	0	–	–	–	–	27	0
Balmazújváros	Total	26	0	1	0	–	–	–	–	27	0
Career total		159	3	20	1	20	0	0	0	199	4

Updated to games played as of 19 May 2019.
