= 2015–16 Ferencvárosi TC season =

Ferencváros
2015–16 season
- Chairman: Gábor Kubatov
- Manager: Thomas Doll
- Stadium: Groupama Arena
- Nemzeti Bajnokság I: 1st
- Hungarian Cup: Winners
- Hungarian Super Cup: Winners
- UEFA Europa League: Second qualifying round
- Top goalscorer: League: Dániel Böde (17); All: Dániel Böde (20)
- Highest home attendance: 17,489 vs Újpest (12 December 2015); Nemzeti Bajnokság I
- Lowest home attendance: 1,967 vs Csákvár (28 October 2015); Hungarian Cup
- Average home league attendance: 7,737
- Biggest win: 10–0 vs Nagyecsed (A) (14 October 2015); Hungarian Cup
- Biggest defeat: 0–2 vs Željezničar (A) (23 July 2015); UEFA Europa League
Home colours	Away colours
- All statistics correct as of 8 May 2016.

The 2015–16 Ferencvárosi TC season was the club's 113th season in existence and the 7th consecutive season in the top flight of Hungarian football. In addition to the domestic league, Ferencváros are participating in this season's editions of the Hungarian Cup, the Hungarian Super Cup and the UEFA Europa League.

== First team squad ==
Note: Flags indicate national team as defined under FIFA eligibility rules; some limited exceptions apply. Players may hold more than one non-FIFA nationality.

No.	Pos.	Nation	Player
3	FW	ROU	László Hodgyai
4	DF	HUN	Erik Silye
10	MF	HUN	András Radó
11	FW	SVK	Stanislav Šesták
13	FW	HUN	Dániel Böde
14	FW	HUN	Dominik Nagy
15	MF	HUN	Tamás Hajnal
16	DF	HUN	Leandro
17	DF	HUN	Ádám Pintér
19	MF	HUN	Gábor Gyömbér
20	MF	HUN	Zoltán Gera
22	MF	HUN	Attila Busai

No.	Pos.	Nation	Player
24	MF	BEL	Roland Lamah
27	DF	POL	Michał Nalepa
30	MF	SRB	Vladan Čukić
35	FW	GER	Florian Trinks
55	GK	HUN	Levente Jova
66	DF	AUT	Emir Dilaver
67	FW	HUN	István Lakatos
77	FW	ECU	Cristian Ramírez
90	GK	HUN	Dénes Dibusz
97	FW	HUN	Roland Varga
99	MF	HUN	Ádám Nagy

== Transfers ==
=== Summer ===
In: Note: Flags indicate national team as defined under FIFA eligibility rules; some limited exceptions apply. Players may hold more than one non-FIFA nationality.

No.	Pos.	Nation	Player
4	DF	HUN	Sándor Hidvégi (loan return from Dunaújváros)
8	FW	HUN	Zsolt Haraszti (from Paks)
10	MF	HUN	András Radó (from Haladás)
11	FW	SVK	Stanislav Šesták (from (Germany) VfL Bochum)
14	FW	NED	Jack Tuijp (loan return from (Netherlands) Helmond)
16	DF	HUN	Leandro (from (Cyprus) Omonia)
17	DF	HUN	Ádám Pintér (from (Greece) Levadiakos)
31	GK	HUN	Roland Kunsági (loan return from Mezőkövesd)
34	MF	HUN	Tamás Csilus (loan return from Pápa)
35	DF	HUN	Predrag Bošnjak (loan return from Nyíregyháza)
37	MF	HUN	Antal Péter (loan return from Soroksár)
67	FW	HUN	István Lakatos (from Youth System)
77	DF	ECU	Ramírez (from (Germany) Fortuna Düsseldorf)

Out: Note: Flags indicate national team as defined under FIFA eligibility rules; some limited exceptions apply. Players may hold more than one non-FIFA nationality.

No.	Pos.	Nation	Player
4	DF	HUN	Sándor Hidvégi (to SZTK)
5	DF	GER	Philipp Bönig (Retired)
8	MF	CRO	Tomislav Havojić (End of contract)
11	FW	GER	Benjamin Lauth (Retired)
14	FW	NED	Jack Tuijp (to (Netherlands) Volendam)
17	MF	CRO	Stjepan Kukuruzović (to (Liechtenstein) Vaduz)
23	MF	HUN	Dániel Nagy (to (Germany) Würzburg)
25	MF	HUN	Ákos Buzsáky (Retired)
34	MF	HUN	Tamás Csilus (loan to Kisvárda)
35	DF	HUN	Predrag Bošnjak (to Haladás)
37	MF	HUN	Antal Péter (to Paks)
39	DF	CRO	Mateo Pavlović (loan return to (Germany) Werder Bremen)
44	DF	ESP	David Mateos (to (United States) Orlando City)
70	FW	HUN	Roland Ugrai (to Haladás)
85	GK	HUN	Pál Tarczy (to Kisvárda)
88	MF	BRA	Somália (to (France) Toulouse)

=== Winter ===
In: Note: Flags indicate national team as defined under FIFA eligibility rules; some limited exceptions apply. Players may hold more than one non-FIFA nationality.

No.	Pos.	Nation	Player
33	MF	HUN	Dávid Holman (loan return from (Poland) Lech Poznań)
35	MF	GER	Florian Trinks (from (Germany) Greuther Fürth)

Out: Note: Flags indicate national team as defined under FIFA eligibility rules; some limited exceptions apply. Players may hold more than one non-FIFA nationality.

No.	Pos.	Nation	Player
1	GK	HUN	Péter Kurucz (Retired)
8	MF	HUN	Zsolt Haraszti (to Videoton)
31	GK	HUN	Roland Kunsági (loan to Soroksár)
33	MF	HUN	Dávid Holman (to Debrecen)
34	DF	HUN	Ádám Csilus (loan to Soroksár)
95	MF	HUN	Attila Haris (loan to Soroksár)

== Competitions ==
=== Overview ===
Competition	First match	Last match	Starting round	Final position	Record							
Competition	First match	Last match	Starting round	Final position	Pld	W	D	L	GF	GA	GD	Win %
Nemzeti Bajnokság I	19 July 2015	30 April 2016	Matchday 1	Winners	33	24	4	5	69	23	+46	72.73
Hungarian Cup	14 October 2015	7 May 2016	Round of 32	Winners	8	5	1	2	23	7	+16	62.50
Hungarian Super Cup	5 July 2015		Final	Winners	1	1	0	0	3	0	+3	100.00
UEFA Europa League	2 July 2015	23 July 2015	First qualifying round	Second qualifying round	4	1	1	2	5	5	+0	25.00
Total					46	31	6	9	100	35	+65	67.39

Last updated: 8 May 2016
Source: Competitions

=== Nemzeti Bajnokság I ===
==== League table ====
Pos	Team	Pld	W	D	L	GF	GA	GD	Pts	Qualification or relegation
1	Ferencváros (C)	33	24	4	5	69	23	+46	76	Qualification for the Champions League second qualifying round
2	Videoton	33	17	4	12	42	29	+13	55	Qualification for the Europa League first qualifying round (Note: Since the winners of the 2015–16 Magyar Kupa, Ferencváros, qualified for European competition based on league position, the spot awarded to the cup winners (Europa League first qualifying round) was passed to the fourth-placed team.)
3	Debrecen	33	14	11	8	48	34	+14	53	Qualification for the Europa League first qualifying round
4	MTK Budapest	33	14	9	10	39	37	+2	51	Qualification for the Europa League first qualifying round
5	Haladás	33	13	11	9	33	37	−4	50	

Source: Soccerway
Rules for classification: 1) Points; 2) Matches won; 3) Goal difference; 4) Goals scored; 5) Head-to-head points; 6) Head-to-head goal difference; 7) Head-to-head away goals scored; 8) Fairplay; 9) Draw.
(C) Champions

==== Results summary ====
Overall								Home						Away					
Pld	W	D	L	GF	GA	GD	Pts	W	D	L	GF	GA	GD	W	D	L	GF	GA	GD
33	24	4	5	69	23	+46	76	13	3	1	41	14	+27	11	1	4	28	9	+19

Last updated: 1 May 2016.
Source: Hungarian Football Federation

==== Results by round ====
Round	1	2	3	4	5	6	7	8	9	10	11	12	13	14	15	16	17	18	19	20	21	22	23	24	25	26	27	28	29	30	31	32	33
Ground	A	H	A	A	H	A	H	A	H	A	H	H	A	H	H	A	H	A	H	A	H	A	H	A	H	A	H	A	H	H	A	H	A
Result	W	W	W	W	W	W	W	W	W	D	W	W	W	W	W	L	W	W	L	W	W	L	D	W	W	W	W	L	W	D	L	D	W
Position	1	1	1	1	1	1	1	1	1	1	1	1	1	1	1	1	1	1	1	1	1	1	1	1	1	1	1	1	1	1	1	1	1

Updated to match(es) played on 30 April 2016. Source: Matches
A = Away; H = Home; W = Win; D = Draw; L = Loss

==== Matches ====
19 July 2015 1	Haladás	0–2	Ferencváros	Szombathely
18:00 CEST		Report	Lamah 10'; Šesták 95'	Stadium: Rohonci Street Stadium; Attendance: 4,395; Referee: Viktor Kassai

26 July 2015 2	Ferencváros	3–1	DVTK	Budapest
18:00 CEST	Nalepa 4'; Leandro 23'; Böde 31'	Report	Barczi 54'	Stadium: Groupama Arena; Attendance: 6,027; Referee: Ádám Farkas

1 August 2015 3	Vasas	0–2	Ferencváros	Budapest
18:00 CEST		Report	Böde 48', 59'	Stadium: Illovszky Rudolf Stadion; Attendance: 4,000; Referee: Viktor Kassai

8 August 2015 4	Videoton	1–3	Ferencváros	Székesfehérvár
18:00 CEST	Ivanovski 50'; Vinícius (red card) 36'	Report	Heffler 11' (o.g.); Böde 57', 82'	Stadium: Sóstói Stadion; Attendance: 5,020; Referee: Sándor Andó-Szabó

15 August 2015 5	Ferencváros	2–0	MTK Budapest	Budapest
20:30 CEST	Gera 52'; Böde 60'	Report		Stadium: Groupama Arena; Attendance: 6,817; Referee: Zoltán Iványi

22 August 2015 6	Debrecen	0–3	Ferencváros	Debrecen
20:30 CEST		Report	Böde 12'; Šesták 66'; Radó 70'	Stadium: Nagyerdei Stadion; Attendance: 6,241; Referee: Zsolt Szabó

29 August 2015 7	Ferencváros	2–0	Paks	Budapest
20:30 CEST	Böde 14'; Lamah 24'	Report		Stadium: Groupama Arena; Attendance: 7,497; Referee: Péter Solymosi

12 September 2015 8	Újpest	1–2	Ferencváros	Budapest
20:30 CEST	Diagne 4'	Report	Böde 78', 89'	Stadium: Szusza Ferenc Stadium; Attendance: 8,445; Referee: Viktor Kassai

19 September 2015 9	Ferencváros	1–0	Békéscsaba	Budapest
18:00 CEST	Böde 21'	Report		Stadium: Groupama Arena; Attendance: 8,824; Referee: Gergely Szőts

26 September 2015 10	Puskás Akadémia	0–0	Ferencváros	Felcsút
18:00 CEST		Report		Stadium: Pancho Arena; Attendance: 3,789; Referee: Sándor Andó-Szabó

3 October 2015 11	Ferencváros	2–1	Budapest Honvéd	Budapest
20:30 CEST	Hajnal 35'; Varga 39'	Report	Youla 9'	Stadium: Groupama Arena; Attendance: 9,037; Referee: Viktor Kassai

17 October 2015 12	Ferencváros	3–1	Haladás	Budapest
20:30 CEST	Šesták 18'; Varga 37'; Ramírez 79'	Report	P. Nagy 59'	Stadium: Groupama Arena; Attendance: 7,869; Referee: József Erdős

24 October 2015 13	DVTK	0–2	Ferencváros	Miskolc
17:30 CEST	Tamás (red card) 17'	Report	Šesták 29'; Lamah 79'	Stadium: Diósgyőri Stadion; Attendance: 8,165; Referee: Zsolt Szabó

31 October 2015 14	Ferencváros	5–1	Vasas	Budapest
18:00 CET	Šesták 2'; Varga 23', 63'; Leandro 26'; Ramírez 81'	Report	Ubiparip 46'	Stadium: Groupama Arena; Attendance: 6,873; Referee: Ádám Farkas

2 December 2015 15	Ferencváros	1–0	Videoton	Budapest
18:30 CET	Radó 62'	Report		Stadium: Groupama Arena; Attendance: 5,379; Referee: Péter Solymosi

21 November 2015 16	MTK Budapest	1–0	Ferencváros	Budapest
18:00 CET	Torghelle 31'	Report		Stadium: Illovszky Rudolf Stadion; Attendance: 2,114; Referee: József Erdős

28 November 2015 17	Ferencváros	3–0	Debrecen	Budapest
18:00 CET	Ramírez 66'; Gera 78'; Radó 87'	Report		Stadium: Groupama Arena; Attendance: 6,642; Referee: Viktor Kassai

5 December 2015 18	Paks	0–5	Ferencváros	Paks
15:30 CET		Report	Lamah 22'; Šesták 56'; Böde 74'; Busai 88'; Varga 90'	Stadium: Stadion PSE; Attendance: 4,113; Referee: Zsolt Szabó

12 December 2015 19	Ferencváros	0–1	Újpest	Budapest
19:30 CET		Report	Diagne 59'	Stadium: Groupama Arena; Attendance: 17,489; Referee: Viktor Kassai

13 February 2016 20	Békéscsaba	0–1	Ferencváros	Békéscsaba
15:30 CET		Report	Pintér 9'	Stadium: Kórház utcai Stadion; Attendance: 2,532; Referee: Ferenc Karakó

20 February 2016 21	Ferencváros	2–0	Puskás Akadémia	Budapest
15:30 CET	Ramírez 63'; Böde 66'; Leandro (red card) 84'	Report		Stadium: Groupama Arena; Attendance: 6,124; Referee: Ádám Farkas

27 February 2016 22	Budapest Honvéd	2–1	Ferencváros	Budapest
18:00 CET	Baráth 41'; Vasiljević 56'	Report	Lamah 88'; Dilaver (red card) 90+5'	Stadium: Bozsik József Stadion; Attendance: 4,460; Referee: Péter Solymosi

5 March 2016 23	Ferencváros	2–2	DVTK	Budapest
18:00 CET	Gera 10'; Pintér 85'	Report	Bognár 17'; Novothny 88'	Stadium: Groupama Arena; Attendance: 7,144; Referee: Sándor Andó-Szabó

9 March 2016 24	Békéscsaba	0–1	Ferencváros	Békéscsaba
18:00 CET		Report	Radó 9'	Stadium: Kórház utcai Stadion; Attendance: 2,396; Referee: Csaba Pintér

12 March 2016 25	Ferencváros	4–0	Puskás Akadémia	Budapest
18:00 CET	Lamah 68'; Böde 70', 85'; Radó 90'	Report		Stadium: Groupama Arena; Attendance: 4,858; Referee: Tamás Bognár

19 March 2016 26	Vasas	1–4	Ferencváros	Budapest
18:00 CET	Pavlov 22'	Report	Šesták 11', 19'; Böde 65', 76'	Stadium: Illovszky Rudolf Stadion; Attendance: 3,452; Referee: Viktor Kassai

10 April 2016 27	Ferencváros	2–1	Budapest Honvéd	Budapest
19:00 CEST	Trinks 63'; Busai 70'	Report	Busai 26' (o.g.)	Stadium: Groupama Arena; Attendance: 7,053; Referee: Sándor Andó-Szabó

2 April 2016 28	Debrecen	2–1	Ferencváros	Debrecen
18:30 CEST	Takács 28', 30'	Report	Šesták 62'; Ramírez (red card) 90+1'	Stadium: Nagyerdei Stadion; Attendance: 5,658; Referee: Ádám Farkas

6 April 2016 29	Ferencváros	5–2	Paks	Budapest
18:00 CEST	Radó 6'; Hajnal 21'; Gyömbér 66'; Kulcsár 82' (o.g.); Lamah 90+2'	Report	Szakály 34'; Hahn 60'; Balázs (red card) 67'	Stadium: Groupama Arena; Attendance: 7,594; Referee: Csaba Pintér

16 April 2016 30	Ferencváros	2–2	MTK Budapest	Budapest
20:30 CEST	Gera 59'; Varga 63'	Report	Kanta 25'; Torghelle 77'	Stadium: Groupama Arena; Attendance: 5,043; Referee: Zoltán Iványi

20 April 2016 31	Videoton	1–0	Ferencváros	Felcsút
20:00 CEST	Stopira 56'	Report		Stadium: Pancho Arena; Attendance: 2,112; Referee: Péter Solymosi

23 April 2016 32	Ferencváros	2–2	Újpest	Budapest
20:30 CEST	Varga 42'; Litauszki 53' (o.g.)	Report	Andrić 6'; Lencse 40'	Stadium: Groupama Arena; Attendance: 11,267; Referee: Viktor Kassai

30 April 2016 33	Haladás	0–1	Ferencváros	Sopron
16:30 CEST		Report	Kovács 31' (o.g.)	Stadium: Káposztás utcai Stadion; Attendance: 4,137; Referee: Sándor Andó-Szabó

=== Hungarian Cup ===
14 October 2015 Round of 32	Nagyecsed	0–10	Ferencváros	Nagyecsed
14:00 CEST		Report	Nagy 1'; Haris 5', 40'; Busai 17', 28', 81', 87'; Lamah 19'; Varga 43'; Lakatos 46'	Stadium: Nagyecsed RSE Sporttelep; Attendance: 1,285; Referee: László Lovas

==== Round of 16 ====
28 October 2015 First leg	Ferencváros	4–1	Csákvár	Budapest
18:00 CET	Leandro 25'; Šesták 32'; Busai 48'; Varga 51'; Csilus (red card) 90+2'	Report	Cs. Molnár 90+3'; Gróf (red card) 13'	Stadium: Groupama Arena; Attendance: 1,967; Referee: Attila Molnár

18 November 2015 Second leg	Csákvár	4–3 (5–7 agg.)	Ferencváros	Csákvár
17:00 CET	Molnár 38'; Nyilasi 55'; Domján 57'; Dilaver 81' (o.g.)	Report	Böde 8'; Pintér 41'; Hajnal 54'	Stadium: Sóstói Stadion; Referee: Balázs Berke
Note: Ferenváros won 7-5 on aggregate.

==== Quarter-finals ====
10 February 2016 First leg	Ferencváros	0–1	Videoton	Budapest
18:00 CET		Report	Feczesin 42'	Stadium: Groupama Arena; Attendance: 3,857; Referee: Zsolt Szabó

2 March 2016 Second leg	Videoton	1–2 (2–2 agg.)	Ferencváros	Felcsút
18:00 CEST	Stopira 21'; Pátkai (red card) 83'; Suljić (red card) 84'	Report	Böde 52'; Kovácsik 82' (o.g.); Trinks (red card) 84'	Stadium: Pancho Arena; Attendance: 2,800; Referee: Viktor Kassai
Note: 2–2 on aggregate. Ferencváros won on away goals.

==== Semi-finals ====
16 March 2016 First leg	Debrecen	0–0	Ferencváros	Debrecen
18:00 CEST		Report		Stadium: Nagyerdei Stadion; Attendance: 4,208; Referee: Zoltán Iványi

13 April 2016 Second leg	Ferencváros	3–0 (3–0 agg.)	Debrecen	Budapest
18:00 CEST	Gera 22' (pen.), 79'; Nagy 90'	Report	Verpecz (red card) 19'	Stadium: Groupama Arena; Attendance: 4,500; Referee: Ferenc Karakó
Note: Ferenváros won 3-0 on aggregate.

==== Final ====
7 May 2016 Final	Újpest	0–1	Ferencváros	Budapest
20:30 CEST		Report	Gera 78'	Stadium: Groupama Arena; Attendance: 19,000; Referee: Zoltán Iványi

=== Hungarian Super Cup ===
5 July 2015 Final	Videoton	0–3	Ferencváros	Székesfehérvár
20:15 CEST		Report	Lamah 21'; Varga 26'; Somália 89'; Nalepa (red card) 37'	Stadium: Sóstói Stadion; Attendance: 3,679; Referee: Sándor Andó-Szabó

=== UEFA Europa League ===
==== First qualifying round ====
2 July 2015 First leg	Go Ahead Eagles (Netherlands)	1–1	(Hungary) Ferencváros	Emmen, Netherlands
20:00 CEST	Vriends 45+2'	Report	Gera 3'	Stadium: JENS Vesting (Note: Go Ahead Eagles played their home match at JENS Vesting, Emmen, instead of their regular stadium De Adelaarshorst, Deventer.); Attendance: 6,248; Referee: Craig Pawson (England)

9 July 2015 Second leg	Ferencváros (Hungary)	4–1 (5–2 agg.)	(Netherlands) Go Ahead Eagles	Budapest, Hungary
20:30 CEST	Gera 4'; Böde 20'; Busai 45'; Haraszti 89'	Report	Turuc 90+3'	Stadium: Groupama Arena; Attendance: 0 (Note: The Ferencváros v Go Ahead Eagles match was played behind closed doors due to UEFA punishment.); Referee: Bojan Pandžić (Sweden)
Note: Ferencváros won 5–2 on aggregate.

==== Second qualifying round ====
16 July 2015 First leg	Ferencváros (Hungary)	0–1	(Bosnia and Herzegovina) Željezničar	Budapest, Hungary
20:30 CEST		Report	Beganović 90'	Stadium: Groupama Arena; Attendance: 8,853; Referee: Gunnar Jarl Jónsson (Iceland)

23 July 2015 Second leg	Željezničar (Bosnia and Herzegovina)	2–0 (3–0 agg.)	(Hungary) Ferencváros	Sarajevo, Bosnia and Herzegovina
18:00 CEST	Kokot 23'; Đelmić 90+1'	Report		Stadium: Asim Ferhatović Hase Stadium; Attendance: 16,000; Referee: Orel Grinfeeld (Israel)
Note: Željezničar won 3–0 on aggregate.

== Statistics ==
=== Appearances and goals ===
Last updated on 8 May 2016.

No.	Pos	Nat	Player	Total		OTP Bank Liga		Hungarian Cup		Hungarian Super Cup		UEFA Europa League	
No.	Pos	Nat	Player	Apps	Goals	Apps	Goals	Apps	Goals	Apps	Goals	Apps	Goals
3	FW	(Romania) ROU	László Hodgyai	1	0	0	0	1	0	0	0	0	0
4	DF	(Hungary) HUN	Erik Silye	1	0	0	0	1	0	0	0	0	0
10	MF	(Hungary) HUN	András Radó	32	6	25	6	6	0	0	0	1	0
11	FW	(Slovakia) SVK	Stanislav Šesták	30	10	24	9	4	1	0	0	2	0
13	FW	(Hungary) HUN	Dániel Böde	41	20	31	17	5	2	1	0	4	1
14	FW	(Hungary) HUN	Dominik Nagy	22	2	15	0	5	2	1	0	1	0
15	MF	(Hungary) HUN	Tamás Hajnal	28	3	21	2	4	1	0	0	3	0
16	DF	(Hungary) HUN	Leandro	40	3	30	2	5	1	1	0	4	0
17	DF	(Hungary) HUN	Ádám Pintér	26	3	18	2	8	1	0	0	0	0
19	MF	(Hungary) HUN	Gábor Gyömbér	18	1	11	1	2	0	1	0	4	0
20	MF	(Hungary) HUN	Gera Zoltán	39	9	30	4	5	3	0	0	4	2
22	MF	(Hungary) HUN	Attila Busai	26	8	19	2	2	5	1	0	4	1
24	MF	(Belgium) BEL	Roland Lamah	46	9	33	7	8	1	1	1	4	0
27	DF	(Poland) POL	Michał Nalepa	40	1	29	1	7	0	1	0	3	0
30	MF	(Serbia) SRB	Vladan Čukić	19	0	12	0	7	0	0	0	0	0
35	MF	(Germany) GER	Florian Trinks	14	1	12	1	2	0	0	0	0	0
43	FW	(Hungary) HUN	Patrik Popov	1	0	0	0	1	0	0	0	0	0
55	GK	(Hungary) HUN	Levente Jova	5	-7	2	-2	3	-5	0	-0	0	-0
66	DF	(Austria) AUT	Emir Dilaver	37	0	27	0	7	0	0	0	3	0
67	FW	(Hungary) HUN	István Lakatos	3	1	1	0	2	1	0	0	0	0
77	DF	(Ecuador) ECU	Cristian Ramírez	39	4	28	4	7	0	1	0	3	0
90	GK	(Hungary) HUN	Dénes Dibusz	41	-28	31	-21	5	-2	1	-0	4	-5
97	FW	(Hungary) HUN	Roland Varga	41	10	30	7	6	2	1	1	4	0
99	MF	(Hungary) HUN	Ádám Nagy	30	0	25	0	4	0	1	0	0	0
Players out to loan:
31	GK	(Hungary) HUN	Roland Kunsági	0	0	0	-0	0	-0	0	-0	0	-0
34	DF	(Hungary) HUN	Ádám Csilus	2	0	0	0	2	0	0	0	0	0
95	MF	(Hungary) HUN	Attila Haris	2	2	0	0	2	2	0	0	0	0
Players no longer at the club:
1	GK	(Hungary) HUN	Péter Kurucz	0	0	0	-0	0	-0	0	-0	0	-0
8	FW	(Hungary) HUN	Zsolt Haraszti	8	1	5	0	1	0	1	0	1	1
44	DF	(Spain) ESP	David Mateos	2	0	0	0	0	0	0	0	2	0
70	FW	(Hungary) HUN	Roland Ugrai	2	0	0	0	0	0	1	0	1	0
88	MF	(Brazil) BRA	Somália	8	1	3	0	0	0	1	1	4	0

=== Top scorers ===
Includes all competitive matches. The list is sorted by shirt number when total goals are equal.

Last updated on 8 May 2016

Position	Nation	Number	Name	OTP Bank Liga	Hungarian Cup	Hungarian Super Cup	UEFA Europa League	Total
1	(Hungary)	13	Dániel Böde	17	2	0	1	20
2	(Slovakia)	11	Stanislav Šesták	9	1	0	0	10
2	(Hungary)	97	Roland Varga	7	2	1	0	10
4	(Hungary)	20	Zoltán Gera	4	3	0	2	9
4	(Belgium)	24	Roland Lamah	7	1	1	0	9
6	(Hungary)	22	Attila Busai	2	5	0	1	8
7	(Hungary)	10	András Radó	6	0	0	0	6
8	(Ecuador)	77	Cristian Ramírez	4	0	0	0	4
9	(Hungary)	15	Tamás Hajnal	2	1	0	0	3
9	(Hungary)	16	Leandro	2	1	0	0	3
9	(Hungary)	17	Ádám Pintér	2	1	0	0	3
12	(Hungary)	14	Dominik Nagy	0	2	0	0	2
12	(Hungary)	95	Attila Haris	0	2	0	0	2
14	(Hungary)	8	Zsolt Haraszti	0	0	0	1	1
14	(Hungary)	19	Gábor Gyömbér	1	0	0	0	1
14	(Poland)	27	Michał Nalepa	1	0	0	0	1
14	(Germany)	35	Florian Trinks	1	0	0	0	1
14	(Hungary)	67	István Lakatos	0	1	0	0	1
14	(Brazil)	88	Somália	0	0	1	0	1
/	/	/	Own Goals	4	1	0	0	5
			TOTALS	69	23	3	5	100

=== Hat-tricks ===
Player	Against	Result	Date	Competition	Round
(Hungary) Attila Busai (Note: Busai scored 4 goals.)	Nagyecsed	10–0 (A)	14 October 2015	Hungarian Cup	Round of 32

=== Disciplinary record ===
Includes all competitive matches. Players with 1 card or more included only.

Last updated on 8 May 2016

Position	Nation	Number	Name	OTP Bank Liga		Hungarian Cup		Hungarian Super Cup		UEFA Europa League		Total (Hu Total)	
Position	Nation	Number	Name	Booked	Sent off (straight red)	Booked	Sent off (straight red)	Booked	Sent off (straight red)	Booked	Sent off (straight red)	Booked	Sent off (straight red)
FW	(Hungary)	8	Zsolt Haraszti	1	0	0	0	0	0	0	0	1 (1)	0 (0)
MF	(Hungary)	10	András Radó	0	0	0	0	0	0	1	0	1 (0)	0 (0)
FW	(Slovakia)	11	Stanislav Šesták	2	0	1	0	0	0	1	0	4 (2)	0 (0)
MF	(Hungary)	14	Dominik Nagy	3	0	0	0	1	0	0	0	4 (3)	0 (0)
MF	(Hungary)	15	Tamás Hajnal	1	0	1	0	0	0	1	0	3 (1)	0 (0)
DF	(Hungary)	16	Leandro	4	1	1	0	0	0	0	0	5 (4)	1 (1)
DF	(Hungary)	17	Ádám Pintér	5	0	0	0	0	0	0	0	5 (5)	0 (0)
MF	(Hungary)	19	Gábor Gyömbér	2	0	2	0	0	0	0	0	4 (2)	0 (0)
MF	(Hungary)	20	Zoltán Gera	5	0	1	0	0	0	2	0	8 (5)	0 (0)
MF	(Hungary)	22	Attila Busai	2	0	0	0	0	0	0	0	2 (2)	0 (0)
MF	(Belgium)	24	Roland Lamah	3	0	0	0	0	0	0	0	3 (3)	0 (0)
DF	(Poland)	27	Michał Nalepa	9	0	1	0	0	1	0	0	10 (9)	1 (0)
MF	(Serbia)	30	Vladan Čukić	4	0	1	0	0	0	0	0	5 (4)	0 (0)
DF	(Hungary)	34	Ádám Csilus	0	0	0	1	0	0	0	0	0 (0)	1 (0)
MF	(Germany)	35	Florian Trinks	1	0	0	1	0	0	0	0	1 (1)	1 (0)
GK	(Hungary)	55	Levente Jova	1	0	0	0	0	0	0	0	1 (1)	0 (0)
DF	(Austria)	66	Emir Dilaver	5	1	0	0	0	0	0	0	5 (5)	1 (1)
DF	(Ecuador)	77	Cristian Ramírez	6	1	2	0	0	0	0	0	8 (6)	1 (1)
MF	(Brazil)	88	Somália	1	0	0	0	0	0	0	0	1 (1)	0 (0)
GK	(Hungary)	90	Dénes Dibusz	0	0	0	0	1	0	0	0	1 (0)	0 (0)
FW	(Hungary)	97	Roland Varga	3	0	0	0	0	0	0	0	3 (3)	0 (0)
MF	(Hungary)	99	Ádám Nagy	2	0	1	0	0	0	0	0	3 (2)	0 (0)
			TOTALS	60	3	11	2	2	1	5	0	78 (60)	6 (3)

=== Clean sheets ===
Last updated on 8 May 2016

Position	Nation	Number	Name	OTP Bank Liga	Hungarian Cup	Hungarian Super Cup	UEFA Europa League	Total
1	(Hungary)	90	Dénes Dibusz	16	3	1	0	20
2	(Hungary)	55	Levente Jova	0	1	0	0	1
3	(Hungary)	1	Péter Kurucz	0	0	0	0	0
3	(Hungary)	31	Roland Kunsági	0	0	0	0	0
			TOTALS	16	4	1	0	21
