= 2014–15 Ferencvárosi TC season =

Ferencvárosi TC
2014–15 season
- Chairman: Gábor Kubatov
- Manager: Thomas Doll
- NB 1: 2nd
- Hungarian Cup: Winners
- Hungarian League Cup: Winners
- UEFA Europa League: Second qualifying round
- Top goalscorer: League: Dániel Böde (13); All: Dániel Böde (19)
Home colours	Away colours	Third colours

The 2014–15 season will be Ferencvárosi TC's 112th competitive season, 6th consecutive season in the OTP Bank Liga and 115th year in existence as a football club.

== First team squad ==
Note: Flags indicate national team as defined under FIFA eligibility rules; some limited exceptions apply. Players may hold more than one non-FIFA nationality.

No.	Pos.	Nation	Player
5	DF	GER	Philipp Bönig
8	MF	CRO	Tomislav Havojić
11	FW	GER	Benjamin Lauth
13	FW	HUN	Dániel Böde
14	MF	HUN	Dominik Nagy
17	MF	CRO	Stjepan Kukuruzović
19	MF	HUN	Gábor Gyömbér (captain)
20	MF	HUN	Zoltán Gera
22	MF	HUN	Attila Busai
23	MF	HUN	Dániel Nagy
24	FW	BEL	Roland Lamah
27	DF	POL	Michał Nalepa

No.	Pos.	Nation	Player
30	MF	SRB	Vladan Čukić
33	MF	HUN	Dávid Holman
34	MF	HUN	Ádám Csilus
35	DF	HUN	Predrag Bošnjak
39	DF	CRO	Mateo Pavlović
44	DF	ESP	David Mateos
66	MF	AUT	Emir Dilaver
70	FW	HUN	Roland Ugrai
88	FW	BRA	Somália
90	GK	HUN	Dénes Dibusz
94	FW	HUN	Patrik Popov

== Transfers ==
=== Summer ===
In: Note: Flags indicate national team as defined under FIFA eligibility rules; some limited exceptions apply. Players may hold more than one non-FIFA nationality.

No.	Pos.	Nation	Player
7	MF	HUN	Bence Batik (loan return from MTK)
8	MF	CRO	Tomislav Havojić (from (Croatia) Istra)
11	FW	GER	Benjamin Lauth (from (Germany) 1860 München)
17	MF	CRO	Stjepan Kukuruzović (from (Switzerland) Zürich)
20	MF	HUN	Zoltán Gera (from (England) West Bromwich)
23	MF	HUN	Dániel Nagy (from (Germany) Osnabrück)
24	FW	BEL	Roland Lamah (from (Spain) Osasuna)
27	DF	POL	Michał Nalepa (from (Poland) Wisla Krakow)
34	MF	HUN	Ádám Csilus (from Ferencváros U-19)
35	DF	HUN	Predrag Bošnjak (from Haladás)
39	MF	HUN	Márk Orosz (loan return from Pápa)
39	DF	CRO	Mateo Pavlović (loan from (Germany) Werder Bremen)
66	DF	AUT	Emir Dilaver (from Austria Wien)
85	GK	HUN	Pál Tarczy (from Soroksár)

Out: Note: Flags indicate national team as defined under FIFA eligibility rules; some limited exceptions apply. Players may hold more than one non-FIFA nationality.

No.	Pos.	Nation	Player
1	GK	HUN	Péter Kurucz (loan to Soroksár)
3	DF	NED	Mark Otten (retired)
4	DF	HUN	Sándor Hidvégi (loan to MTK)
7	MF	BIH	Aleksandar Jovanović (to Debrecen)
8	MF	HUN	György Józsi (to Dunaújváros)
10	MF	ROU	Andrei Ionescu
11	FW	NED	Arsenio Valpoort (to (Netherlands) Waalwijk)
14	FW	NED	Jack Tuyp (to (Netherlands) Helmond)
16	MF	HUN	Tamás Csilus (loan to Pápa)
17	FW	MLI	Ulysse Diallo (to (Portugal) Arouca)
21	DF	BIH	Muhamed Bešić (to (England) Everton)
27	MF	NED	Julian Jenner (to Diósgyőr)
37	MF	HUN	Péter Antal (loan to Soroksár)
39	DF	CRO	Mateo Pavlović (loan return to (Germany) Werder Bremen)
39	MF	HUN	Márk Orosz (to Dunaújváros)
41	GK	HUN	Roland Kunsági (loan to Mezőkövesd)
86	DF	HUN	Zsolt Laczkó (loan return to (Italy) Sampdoria)
99	MF	BRA	Leonardo (to (Germany) 1860 München)

=== Winter ===
In: Note: Flags indicate national team as defined under FIFA eligibility rules; some limited exceptions apply. Players may hold more than one non-FIFA nationality.

No.	Pos.	Nation	Player
—	FW	HUN	Roland Varga (from Győr)
—	MF	HUN	Attila Haris (from Ferencváros U-19)
—	FW	HUN	Patrik Popov (from Ferencváros U-19)
—	MF	HUN	Tamás Hajnal (from (Germany) Ingolstadt)
—	DF	ECU	Cristian Ramírez (loan from (Germany) Düsseldorf)

Out: Note: Flags indicate national team as defined under FIFA eligibility rules; some limited exceptions apply. Players may hold more than one non-FIFA nationality.

No.	Pos.	Nation	Player
33	MF	HUN	Dávid Holman (loan to (Poland) Lech Poznań)
35	DF	HUN	Predrag Bošnjak (loan to Nyíregyháza)

- List of Hungarian football transfers summer 2014
- List of Hungarian football transfers winter 2014–15

== Statistics ==
=== Appearances and goals ===
Last updated on 10 December 2014.

No.	Pos	Nat	Player	Total		OTP Bank Liga		Europa League		Hungarian Cup		League Cup	
No.	Pos	Nat	Player	Apps	Goals	Apps	Goals	Apps	Goals	Apps	Goals	Apps	Goals
5	DF	(Germany) GER	Philipp Bönig	19	0	15	0	1	0	1	0	2	0
7	MF	(Hungary) HUN	Bence Batik	10	0	1	0	0	0	2	0	7	0
8	MF	(Croatia) CRO	Tomislav Havojić	8	2	3	0	1	0	1	2	3	0
11	FW	(Germany) GER	Benjamin Lauth	25	10	15	6	4	0	4	4	2	0
13	FW	(Hungary) HUN	Dániel Böde	26	12	16	6	3	0	4	5	3	1
14	MF	(Hungary) HUN	Dominik Nagy	16	1	6	1	0	0	4	0	6	0
17	MF	(Croatia) CRO	Stjepan Kukuruzović	21	4	10	1	4	0	3	3	4	0
19	MF	(Hungary) HUN	Gábor Gyömbér	19	0	12	0	4	0	2	0	1	0
20	MF	(Hungary) HUN	Zoltán Gera	18	3	16	3	1	0	1	0	0	0
22	MF	(Hungary) HUN	Attila Busai	25	9	15	3	4	1	2	1	4	4
23	MF	(Hungary) HUN	Dániel Nagy	18	2	10	0	2	0	2	0	4	2
24	MF	(Belgium) BEL	Roland Lamah	11	2	8	2	0	0	1	0	2	0
27	DF	(Poland) POL	Michał Nalepa	26	2	13	0	4	1	3	0	6	1
30	MF	(Serbia) SRB	Vladan Čukić	20	1	10	0	2	0	3	1	5	0
33	MF	(Hungary) HUN	Dávid Holman	6	2	0	0	1	0	0	0	5	2
34	MF	(Hungary) HUN	Ádám Csilus	6	1	1	0	0	0	2	1	3	0
35	DF	(Hungary) HUN	Predrag Bošnjak	13	0	1	0	4	0	2	0	6	0
39	DF	(Croatia) CRO	Mateo Pavlović	22	0	14	0	2	0	4	0	2	0
44	DF	(Spain) ESP	David Mateos	23	2	12	2	4	0	3	0	4	0
66	MF	(Austria) AUT	Emir Dilaver	27	0	17	0	3	0	3	0	4	0
70	FW	(Hungary) HUN	Roland Ugrai	21	5	11	2	3	2	2	0	5	1
88	FW	(Brazil) BRA	Somália	20	0	12	0	4	0	3	0	1	0
90	GK	(Hungary) HUN	Dénes Dibusz	24	-21	17	-15	4	-5	2	-1	1	0
94	FW	(Hungary) HUN	Patrik Popov	7	1	1	0	0	0	0	0	6	1
Youth players:
3	MF	(Hungary) HUN	Attila Havas	2	0	0	0	0	0	0	0	2	0
18	MF	(Hungary) HUN	Kevin Korozmán	2	0	0	0	0	0	0	0	2	0
31	MF	(Hungary) HUN	Attila Oláh	2	0	0	0	0	0	0	0	2	0
31	DF	(Hungary) HUN	Dávid Valencsik	4	0	0	0	0	0	0	0	4	0
32	FW	(Hungary) HUN	Péter Zsivoczky	4	1	0	0	0	0	0	0	4	1
37	DF	(Hungary) HUN	Krisztián Kárász	3	0	0	0	0	0	0	0	3	0
40	MF	(Hungary) HUN	Ádám Nagy	4	0	0	0	0	0	0	0	4	0
55	GK	(Hungary) HUN	Levente Jova	8	-4	0	0	0	0	2	0	6	-4
71	FW	(Hungary) HUN	Dávid Dragoner	1	0	0	0	0	0	0	0	1	0
72	MF	(Hungary) HUN	Erik Silye	2	0	0	0	0	0	0	0	2	0
77	MF	(Hungary) HUN	Krisztián Kovács	3	0	0	0	0	0	0	0	3	0
85	GK	(Hungary) HUN	Pál Tarczy	1	-1	0	0	0	0	0	0	1	-1
95	MF	(Hungary) HUN	Attila Haris	6	0	0	0	0	0	0	0	6	0
Out to loan:
Players no longer at the club:

=== Top scorers ===
Includes all competitive matches. The list is sorted by shirt number when total goals are equal.

Last updated on 10 December 2014

Position	Nation	Number	Name	OTP Bank Liga	Hungarian Cup	Europa League	League Cup	Total
1	(Hungary)	13	Dániel Böde	6	0	5	1	12
2	(Germany)	11	Benjamin Lauth	6	0	4	0	10
3	(Hungary)	22	Attila Busai	3	1	1	4	9
4	(Hungary)	70	Roland Ugrai	2	2	0	1	5
5	(Croatia)	17	Stjepan Kukuruzović	1	0	3	0	4
6	(Hungary)	20	Zoltán Gera	3	0	0	0	3
7	(Poland)	27	Michał Nalepa	0	1	0	1	2
8	(Spain)	44	David Mateos	2	0	0	0	2
9	(Belgium)	24	Roland Lamah	2	0	0	0	2
10	(Croatia)	8	Tomislav Havojić	0	0	2	0	2
11	(Hungary)	23	Dániel Nagy	0	0	0	2	2
12	(Hungary)	33	Dávid Holman	0	0	0	2	2
13	(Hungary)	14	Dominik Nagy	1	0	0	0	1
14	(Hungary)	34	Ádám Csilus	0	0	1	0	1
15	(Serbia)	30	Vladan Čukić	0	0	1	0	1
16	(Hungary)	15	Péter Zsivoczky	0	0	0	1	1
17	(Hungary)	94	Patrik Popov	0	0	0	1	1
/	/	/	Own Goals	0	0	0	0	0
			TOTALS	26	4	17	13	60

=== Disciplinary record ===
Includes all competitive matches. Players with 1 card or more included only.

Last updated on 10 December 2014

Position	Nation	Number	Name	OTP Bank Liga		Europa League		Hungarian Cup		League Cup		Total (Hu Total)	
Position	Nation	Number	Name	Booked	Sent off (straight red)	Booked	Sent off (straight red)	Booked	Sent off (straight red)	Booked	Sent off (straight red)	Booked	Sent off (straight red)
DF	(Germany)	5	Philipp Bönig	4	0	1	0	0	0	0	0	5 (4)	0 (0)
MF	(Hungary)	7	Bence Batik	1	0	0	0	0	0	1	0	2 (1)	0 (0)
FW	(Germany)	11	Benjamin Lauth	2	0	1	0	0	0	0	0	3 (2)	0 (0)
FW	(Hungary)	13	Dániel Böde	1	0	1	0	0	0	0	0	2 (1)	0 (0)
MF	(Hungary)	19	Gábor Gyömbér	3	0	1	0	0	0	1	0	5 (3)	0 (0)
MF	(Hungary)	20	Zoltán Gera	2	0	0	0	0	0	0	0	2 (2)	0 (0)
MF	(Hungary)	22	Attila Busai	4	0	1	0	0	0	1	0	6 (4)	0 (0)
MF	(Hungary)	23	Dániel Nagy	0	0	1	0	0	0	0	0	1 (0)	0 (0)
DF	(Poland)	27	Michał Nalepa	4	0	2	0	2	0	1	0	9 (4)	0 (0)
MF	(Serbia)	30	Vladan Čukić	6	0	0	0	1	0	2	0	9 (6)	0 (0)
FW	(Hungary)	32	Péter Zsivoczky	0	0	0	0	0	0	1	0	1 (0)	0 (0)
MF	(Hungary)	33	Dávid Holman	0	0	1	0	0	0	0	0	1 (0)	0 (0)
MF	(Hungary)	34	Ádám Csilus	1	0	0	0	0	0	0	0	1 (1)	0 (0)
DF	(Hungary)	35	Predrag Bošnjak	0	1	0	0	0	0	0	0	0 (0)	1 (1)
DF	(Croatia)	39	Mateo Pavlović	6	1	1	0	2	0	0	0	9 (6)	1 (1)
DF	(Spain)	44	David Mateos	4	0	2	0	1	0	1	0	8 (4)	0 (0)
MF	(Austria)	66	Emir Dilaver	1	0	1	0	1	0	1	0	4 (1)	0 (0)
FW	(Hungary)	70	Roland Ugrai	1	0	1	0	0	0	0	0	2 (1)	0 (0)
FW	(Brazil)	88	Somália	0	0	1	0	1	0	0	0	2 (0)	0 (0)
FW	(Hungary)	94	Patrik Popov	0	0	0	0	0	0	2	0	2 (0)	0 (0)
MF	(Hungary)	95	Attila Haris	0	0	0	0	0	0	1	1	1 (0)	1 (0)
			TOTALS	40	2	15	0	8	0	12	1	75 (40)	3 (2)

=== Overall ===
Games played	52 (28 OTP Bank Liga, 4 Europa League, 9 Hungarian Cup and 11 Hungarian League Cup)
Games won	34 (18 OTP Bank Liga, 1 Europa League, 9 Hungarian Cup and 7 Hungarian League Cup)
Games drawn	11 (4 OTP Bank Liga, 1 Europa League, 1 Hungarian Cup and 3 Hungarian League Cup)
Games lost	7 (4 OTP Bank Liga, 2 Europa League, 0 Hungarian Cup and 1 Hungarian League Cup)
Goals scored	105
Goals conceded	36
Goal difference	+69
Yellow cards	83
Red cards	12
Worst discipline	(Croatia) Mateo Pavlović (9 (yellow card) , 1 (red card) )
Best result	8–0 (A) v Hévíz - Hungarian Cup - 13–08–2014
Worst result	0–1 (A) v HNK Rijeka - UEFA Europa League - 17–07–2014
Worst result	1–2 (H) v HNK Rijeka - UEFA Europa League - 24–07–2014
Worst result	0–1 (A) v Pápa - OTP Bank Liga - 03–08–2014
Worst result	1–2 (A) v MTK - OTP Bank Liga - 31–08–2014
Worst result	1–2 (A) v Újpest - OTP Bank Liga - 21–09–2014
Worst result	1–2 (A) v Diósgyőr - OTP Bank Liga - 04–10–2014
Worst result	0–1 (A) v Kaposvár - Ligakupa - 15–10–2014
Most appearances	(Austria) Emir Dilaver (27 appearances)
Top scorer	(Hungary) Dániel Böde (12 goals)
Points	69/102 (67.64%)

Last updated: 21 May 2015

== Nemzeti Bajnokság I ==
=== Matches ===
27 July 2014 1	Kecskemét	1 – 3	Ferencváros	Kecskemét, Bács-Kiskun County
16:30 CEST	Kitl 62'	Report	Böde 25', 76', 85'	Stadium: Széktói Stadion; Attendance: 2,432; Referee: (Hungary) Zoltán Iványi

3 August 2014 2	Pápa	1 – 0	Ferencváros	Pápa, Veszprém County
16:30 CEST	Popin 62'	Report		Stadium: Stadion Várkerti; Attendance: 3,500; Referee: (Hungary) Mihály Fábián

27 August 2014 3	Ferencváros	2 – 0	Dunaújváros	Budapest, Pest County
18:30 CEST	Ugrai 30'; Böde 44'	Report		Stadium: Groupama Arena; Attendance: 7,789; Referee: (Hungary) József Erdős

17 August 2014 4	Győr	0 – 1	Ferencváros	Győr, Győr-Moson-Sopron County
16:30 CEST		Report	Busai 45'	Stadium: ETO Park; Attendance: 7,213; Referee: (Hungary) Sándor Andó-Szabó

24 August 2014 5	Ferencváros	3 – 1	Nyíregyháza	Budapest, Pest County
16:30 CEST	Busai 13'; Gera 28'; Mateos 66' (pen.)	Report	Bajzát 78'	Stadium: Groupama Arena; Attendance: 12,128; Referee: (Hungary) István Vad

31 August 2014 6	MTK	2 – 1	Ferencváros	Budapest, Pest County
16:30 CEST	Poór 25'; Horváth 80'	Report	Lauth 30'	Stadium: Hidegkuti Nándor Stadium; Attendance: 948; Referee: (Hungary) Tamás Bognár

14 September 2014 7	Ferencváros	2 – 1	Puskás	Budapest, Pest County
18:30 CEST	Lauth 23'; Böde 24'	Report	Sallai 79'	Stadium: Groupama Arena; Attendance: 7,082; Referee: (Hungary) Zsolt Szabó

21 September 2014 8	Újpest	2 – 1	Ferencváros	Budapest, Pest County
16:30 CEST	Vasiljević 52' (pen.); Simon 72'	Report	Mateos 56' (pen.)	Stadium: Szusza Ferenc Stadium; Attendance: 8,500; Referee: (Hungary) Ádám Farkas

28 September 2014 9	Ferencváros	0 – 0	Haladás	Budapest, Pest County
18:30 CEST		Report		Stadium: Groupama Arena; Attendance: 7,118; Referee: (Hungary) Mihály Fábián

4 October 2014 10	Diósgyőr	2 – 1	Ferencváros	Diósgyőr, Borsod-Abaúj-Zemplén County
14:00 CEST	Grumić 6'; Takács 60'	Report	Gera 8'	Stadium: DVTK Stadion; Attendance: 8,626; Referee: (Hungary) Zoltán Iványi

18 October 2014 11	Ferencváros	2 – 0	Pécs	Budapest, Pest County
20:00 CEST	Nagy 11'; Busai 82'	Report		Stadium: Groupama Arena; Attendance: 6,023; Referee: (Hungary) Viktor Kassai

26 October 2014 12	Debrecen	2 – 2	Ferencváros	Debrecen, Hajdú-Bihar County
16:30 CET	Varga 56'; Szakály 58'	Report	Ugrai 18'; Lauth 79'	Stadium: Nagyerdei Stadion; Attendance: 8,157; Referee: (Hungary) Zsolt Szabó

1 November 2014 13	Ferencváros	0 – 0	Paks	Budapest, Pest County
20:00 CET		Report		Stadium: Groupama Arena; Attendance: 6,241; Referee: (Hungary) Ádám Farkas

7 November 2014 14	Honvéd	2 – 3	Ferencváros	Budapest, Pest County
19:00 CET	Youla 28' (pen.), 55' (pen.)	Report	Böde 47'; Lauth 48'; Lamah 90' (pen.)	Stadium: Bozsik Stadion; Attendance: 1,650; Referee: (Hungary) Fabian Mihaly

23 November 2014 15	Videoton	0 – 0	Ferencváros	Székesfehérvár, Fejér County
16:30 CET		Report		Stadium: Sóstói Stadion; Attendance: 6,012; Referee: (Hungary) Ádám Farkas

29 November 2014 16	Ferencváros	3 – 1	Kecskemét	Budapest, Pest County
20:00 CET	Lauth 52', 68'; Lamah 62'	Report	Vukasović 42' (pen.)	Stadium: Groupama Arena; Attendance: 3,627; Referee: (Hungary) József Erdős

5 December 2014 17	Ferencváros	2 – 0	Pápa	Budapest, Pest County
19:00 CET	Kukuruzović 28'; Gera 36' (pen.)	Report		Stadium: Groupama Arena; Attendance: 3,465; Referee: (Hungary) Zsolt Szabó

=== Classification ===
Pos	Team	Pld	W	D	L	GF	GA	GD	Pts	Qualification or relegation
1	Videoton (C)	30	22	5	3	64	14	+50	71	Qualification for Champions League second qualifying round
2	Ferencváros	30	19	7	4	49	19	+30	64	Qualification for Europa League first qualifying round
3	MTK	30	18	3	9	39	25	+14	57	Qualification for Europa League first qualifying round
4	Debrecen	30	15	9	6	44	19	+25	54	Qualification for Europa League first qualifying round
5	Paks	30	14	9	7	44	27	+17	51	

Source: mlsz.hu (in Hungarian)
Rules for classification: 1st points; 2nd overall wins; 3rd goal difference; 4th head-to-head points; 5th head-to-head goal difference; 6th head-to-head away goals scored; 7th fair-play points; 8th drawing of lots
(C) Champions

=== Results summary ===
Overall								Home						Away					
Pld	W	D	L	GF	GA	GD	Pts	W	D	L	GF	GA	GD	W	D	L	GF	GA	GD
17	9	4	4	26	15	+11	31	6	2	0	14	3	+11	3	2	4	12	12	0

Last updated: 6 December 2014.
Source: NB1

=== Results by round ===
Round	1	2	3	4	5	6	7	8	9	10	11	12	13	14	15	16	17	18	19	20	21	22	23	24	25	26	27	28	29	30
Ground	A	A	H	A	H	A	H	A	H	A	H	A	H	A	A	H	H													
Result	W	L	W	W	W	L	W	L	D	L	W	D	D	W	D	W	W													
Position	4	7	4	5	3	4	3	5	5	6	5	6	6	6	6	5	5													

Updated to match(es) played on 6 December 2014. Source: Matches
A = Away; H = Home; W = Win; D = Draw; L = Loss

== Hungarian Cup ==
13 August 2014 Round 1	Hévíz	0 – 8	Ferencváros	Hévíz, Zala County
17:00 CEST		Report	Lauth 9', 13', 62'; Kukuruzović 22'; Böde 27'; Havojić 34', 44'; Csilus 49'	Stadium: Hévíz SK Sporttelep; Referee: (Hungary) Gergely Szőts

10 September 2014 Round 2	Vecsés	1 – 6	Ferencváros	Vecsés, Pest County
19:00 CEST	Petruska 88'	Report	Lauth 47'; Kukuruzović 57'; Böde 62', 86', 90'; Busai 74'	Stadium: Budai II László Stadion; Attendance: 2,000; Referee: (Hungary) Ádám Radványi

24 September 2014 Round 3	ESMTK	0 – 3	Ferencváros	Pesterzsébet, Pest County
15:00 CEST		Report	Kukuruzović 18'; Böde 32'; Čukić 83'	Stadium: Stadium Ady Street; Attendance: 1,000; Referee: (Hungary) Tamás Nazsa

29 October 2014 Quarter-final	Honvéd	0 – 0 (a.e.t.) (1 – 3 p)	Ferencváros	Budapest, Pest County
18:00 CET		Report		Stadium: Bozsik Stadion; Attendance: 600; Referee: (Hungary) Péter Solymosi
	Penalties
	Portilla (penalty scored); Hidi (penalty missed); Bobál (penalty missed); Kapacina (penalty missed)		Gera (penalty scored); Busai (penalty missed); Čukić (penalty scored); Nagy (penalty scored)

== League Cup ==
3 September 2014 1	Paks	1 – 1	Ferencváros	Paks, Tolna County
18:00 CEST	Haraszti 85'	Report	Zsivoczky 15'	Stadium: Stadion PSE; Attendance: 750; Referee: (Hungary) Gábor Oláh

17 September 2014 2	Ferencváros	2 – 0	Zalaegerszeg	Budapest, Pest County
18:00 CEST	Ugrai 34'; Nagy 81'	Report		Stadium: Groupama Arena; Attendance: 437; Referee: (Hungary) József Berger

8 October 2014 3	Ferencváros	3 – 0	Kaposvár	Budapest, Pest County
18:00 CEST	Popov 48'; Nalepa 56'; Böde 67'	Report		Stadium: Groupama Arena; Attendance: 740; Referee: (Hungary) Róbert Nagy

15 October 2014 4	Kaposvár	1 – 0	Ferencváros	Kaposvár, Somogy County
18:00 CEST	Házi 54'	Report		Stadium: Stadion Kaposvár Rákóczi; Attendance: 200; Referee: (Hungary) Béla Botló

12 November 2014 5	Zalaegerszeg	1 – 1	Ferencváros	Zalaegerszeg, Zala County
18:00 CET	Bailo 61'	Report	Holman 41'	Stadium: ZTE Arena; Attendance: 450; Referee: (Hungary) Ádám Németh

25 November 2014 6	Ferencváros	2 – 1	Paks	Budapest, Pest County
16:00 CET	Busai 28'; Nagy 36'	Report	Simon 51'	Stadium: Groupama Arena; Attendance: 150; Referee: (Hungary) Ádám Radványi

Pos	Team	Pld	W	D	L	GF	GA	GD	Pts	Qualification	FER	PAK	KAP	ZAL
1	Ferencváros	6	3	2	1	9	4	+5	11	Advance to knockout phase	—	2–1	3–0	2–0
2	Paks	6	2	3	1	13	10	+3	9	Advance to knockout phase	1–1	—	4–3	2–2
3	Kaposvár	6	2	0	4	6	12	−6	6		1–0	1–4	—	1–0
4	Zalaegerszeg	6	1	3	2	5	7	−2	6		1–1	1–1	1–0	—

Source: Soccerway

=== Knockout phase ===
2 December 2014 Round of 16	Ferencváros	4 – 1	Újpest	Budapest, Pest County
18:00 CET	Busai 12', 21', 29'; Holman 34'	Report	Stanisavljević 82'	Stadium: Groupama Arena; Attendance: 1,400; Referee: (Hungary) Csaba Pintér

10 December 2014 Round of 16	Újpest	0 – 0 (1 – 4 agg.)	Ferencváros	Budapest, Pest County
17:30 CET		Report		Stadium: Szusza Ferenc Stadium; Attendance: 300; Referee: (Hungary) Zoltán Iványi

== UEFA Europa League ==
The First and Second Qualifying Round draws took place at UEFA headquarters in Nyon, Switzerland on 23 June 2014.

1 July 2014 Q1 Leg 1	Sliema Wanderers (Malta)	1 – 1	(Hungary) Ferencváros	Ta' Qali
17:45 CEST	Ohawuchi 39'	Report	Nalepa 77'	Stadium: Ta' Qali National Stadium; Referee: (Northern Ireland) Arnold Hunter

10 July 2014 Q1 Leg 2	Ferencváros (Hungary)	2 – 1 (3 – 2 agg.)	(Malta) Sliema Wanderers	Budapest
20:30 CEST	Ugrai 14' (pen.); Busai 56'	Report	Scozzese 60'	Stadium: Ferenc Puskás Stadium; Attendance: 4,724; Referee: (Bosnia and Herzegovina) Ognjen Valjić

17 July 2014 Q2 Leg 1	Rijeka (Croatia)	1 – 0	Ferencváros (Hungary)	Rijeka
20:30 CEST	Krstanović 85' (pen.)	Report		Stadium: Stadion Kantrida; Attendance: 9,000; Referee: (Germany) Tobias Stieler

24 July 2014 Q2 Leg 2	Ferencváros (Hungary)	1 – 2 (1 – 3 agg.)	Rijeka (Croatia)	Budapest
20:30 CEST	Ugrai 65' (pen.)	Report	Krstanović 20' (pen.); Samardžić 37'	Stadium: Ferenc Puskás Stadium; Attendance: 5,127; Referee: (Italy) Paolo Valeri
