= 2016–17 Ferencvárosi TC season =

Ferencvárosi TC
2016–17 season
- Chairman: (Hungary) Gábor Kubatov
- Manager: (Germany) Thomas Doll
- NB 1: 4th
- Hungarian Cup: Winner
- UEFA Champions League: Second qualifying round
- Top goalscorer: League: (Hungary) Dániel Böde (11 goals); All: (Hungary) Dániel Böde (16 goals)
- Highest home attendance: 14,970 v Vasas 31 May 2017
- Lowest home attendance: 4,055 v Budafok 26 April 2017
Home colours	Away colours

The 2016–17 season was Ferencvárosi TC's 114th competitive season, 8th consecutive season in the OTP Bank Liga and 117th year in existence as a football club.

== First team squad ==
Note: Flags indicate national team as defined under FIFA eligibility rules; some limited exceptions apply. Players may hold more than one non-FIFA nationality.

No.	Pos.	Nation	Player
3	FW	HUN	Norbert Kundrák
4	DF	HUN	Krisztián Kárász
5	DF	GER	Oliver Hüsing
6	MF	HUN	László Kleinheisler
7	FW	HUN	Bence Batik
8	MF	HUN	Gergő Lovrencsics
10	MF	HUN	András Radó
11	MF	HUN	István Bognár
13	FW	HUN	Dániel Böde
15	MF	HUN	Tamás Hajnal
16	DF	HUN	Leandro
17	MF	HUN	Kornél Csernik
18	FW	KOR	Ryu Seung-woo
19	MF	GER	Julian Koch

No.	Pos.	Nation	Player
20	MF	HUN	Zoltán Gera
21	DF	HUN	Endre Botka
23	FW	AUT	Marco Djuricin
27	DF	POL	Michał Nalepa
30	MF	SRB	Vladan Čukić
31	GK	HUN	Ádám Holczer
35	FW	GER	Florian Trinks
37	DF	GER	Janek Sternberg
40	FW	NIG	Amadou Moutari
51	MF	HUN	András Csonka
66	DF	AUT	Emir Dilaver
90	GK	HUN	Dénes Dibusz
97	FW	HUN	Roland Varga

== Transfers ==
=== Summer ===
In: Note: Flags indicate national team as defined under FIFA eligibility rules; some limited exceptions apply. Players may hold more than one non-FIFA nationality.

No.	Pos.	Nation	Player
5	DF	GER	Oliver Hüsing (from (Germany) Werder Bremen)
8	MF	HUN	Gergő Lovrencsics (from (Poland) Lech Poznań)
18	FW	KOR	Ryu Seung-woo (loan from (Germany) Bayer Leverkusen)
21	MF	HUN	Kornél Csernik (from Ferencváros youth)
23	FW	AUT	Marco Djuricin (loan from (Austria) Red Bull Salzburg)

Out: Note: Flags indicate national team as defined under FIFA eligibility rules; some limited exceptions apply. Players may hold more than one non-FIFA nationality.

No.	Pos.	Nation	Player
3	FW	ROU	László Hodgyai (to (Romania) CFR Cluj)
11	FW	SVK	Stanislav Šesták (to (Slovakia) Poprad)
24	FW	BEL	Roland Lamah (to (United States) Dallas)
41	GK	HUN	Roland Kunsági (loan to Győr)
99	MF	HUN	Ádám Nagy (to (Italy) Bologna)

=== Winter ===
In: Note: Flags indicate national team as defined under FIFA eligibility rules; some limited exceptions apply. Players may hold more than one non-FIFA nationality.

No.	Pos.	Nation	Player
6	MF	HUN	László Kleinheisler (loan from (Germany) Werder Bremen)
11	MF	HUN	István Bognár (from Diósgyőr)
19	MF	GER	Julian Koch (from (Germany) Fortuna Düsseldorf)
21	DF	HUN	Endre Botka (from Budapest Honvéd)
31	GK	HUN	Ádám Holczer (loan return from Soroksár)
37	DF	GER	Janek Sternberg (from (Germany) Werder Bremen)
40	FW	NIG	Amadou Moutari (from (Russia) Anzhi Makhachkala)

Out: Note: Flags indicate national team as defined under FIFA eligibility rules; some limited exceptions apply. Players may hold more than one non-FIFA nationality.

No.	Pos.	Nation	Player
14	MF	HUN	Dominik Nagy (to (Poland) Legia Warsaw)
17	MF	HUN	Ádám Pintér (to (Germany) Greuther Fürth)
19	MF	HUN	Gábor Gyömbér (to Puskás Akadémia)
22	MF	HUN	Attila Busai (to Diósgyőr)
55	GK	HUN	Levente Jova (loan to Soroksár)
77	DF	ECU	Cristian Ramírez (to (Russia) Krasnodar)

== Statistics ==
=== Appearances and goals ===
Last updated on 31 May 2017.

No.	Pos	Nat	Player	Total		OTP Bank Liga		Champions League		Hungarian Cup	
No.	Pos	Nat	Player	Apps	Goals	Apps	Goals	Apps	Goals	Apps	Goals
3	FW	(Hungary) HUN	Norbert Kundrák	4	2	2	0	0	0	2	2
4	DF	(Hungary) HUN	Krisztián Kárász	1	0	0	0	0	0	1	0
5	DF	(Germany) GER	Oliver Hüsing	26	0	19	0	1	0	6	0
6	MF	(Hungary) HUN	László Kleinheisler	15	0	10	0	0	0	5	0
7	DF	(Hungary) HUN	Bence Batik	1	0	0	0	0	0	1	0
8	MF	(Hungary) HUN	Gergő Lovrencsics	39	1	28	1	2	0	9	0
10	MF	(Hungary) HUN	András Radó	19	2	13	0	1	0	5	2
11	MF	(Hungary) HUN	István Bognár	12	2	8	0	0	0	4	2
13	FW	(Hungary) HUN	Dániel Böde	37	16	29	11	2	1	6	4
15	MF	(Hungary) HUN	Tamás Hajnal	25	3	19	2	0	0	6	1
16	DF	(Hungary) HUN	Leandro	33	3	25	2	2	0	6	1
17	MF	(Hungary) HUN	Kornél Csernik	14	0	8	0	0	0	6	0
18	FW	(South Korea) KOR	Ryu Seung-woo	13	2	11	1	0	0	2	1
19	MF	(Germany) GER	Julian Koch	8	0	6	0	0	0	2	0
20	MF	(Hungary) HUN	Zoltán Gera	37	10	29	8	2	1	6	1
21	DF	(Hungary) HUN	Endre Botka	13	0	10	0	0	0	3	0
23	FW	(Austria) AUT	Marco Djuricin	32	11	25	8	2	0	5	3
27	DF	(Poland) POL	Michał Nalepa	30	2	21	1	1	0	8	1
30	MF	(Serbia) SRB	Vladan Čukić	21	1	15	0	0	0	6	1
31	GK	(Hungary) HUN	Ádám Holczer	7	-8	5	-6	0	0	2	-2
35	MF	(Germany) GER	Florian Trinks	13	4	10	3	2	0	1	1
37	DF	(Germany) GER	Janek Sternberg	18	1	11	1	0	0	7	0
40	FW	(Niger) NIG	Amadou Moutari	21	7	14	3	0	0	7	4
51	MF	(Hungary) HUN	András Csonka	1	0	0	0	0	0	1	0
66	DF	(Austria) AUT	Emir Dilaver	40	2	30	2	2	0	8	0
90	GK	(Hungary) HUN	Dénes Dibusz	36	-44	28	-38	2	-2	6	-4
97	FW	(Hungary) HUN	Roland Varga	24	5	17	3	1	0	6	2
Players out to loan:
55	GK	(Hungary) HUN	Levente Jova	2	0	0	0	0	0	2	0
Players no longer at the club:
11	FW	(Slovakia) SVK	Stanislav Šesták	8	0	6	0	2	0	0	0
14	MF	(Hungary) HUN	Dominik Nagy	21	1	18	1	2	0	1	0
17	MF	(Hungary) HUN	Ádám Pintér	15	0	11	0	2	0	2	0
19	MF	(Hungary) HUN	Gábor Gyömbér	14	1	12	0	0	0	2	1
22	MF	(Hungary) HUN	Attila Busai	9	6	6	2	0	0	3	4
77	DF	(Ecuador) ECU	Cristian Ramírez	17	0	14	0	2	0	1	0

=== Top scorers ===
Includes all competitive matches. The list is sorted by shirt number when total goals are equal.

Last updated on 31 May 2017

Position	Nation	Number	Name	OTP Bank Liga	Champions League	Hungarian Cup	Total
1	(Hungary)	13	Dániel Böde	11	1	4	16
2	(Austria)	23	Marco Djuricin	8	0	3	11
3	(Hungary)	20	Zoltán Gera	8	1	1	10
4	(Niger)	40	Amadou Moutari	3	0	4	7
5	(Hungary)	22	Attila Busai	2	0	4	6
6	(Hungary)	97	Roland Varga	3	0	2	5
7	(Germany)	35	Florian Trinks	3	0	1	4
8	(Hungary)	16	Leandro	2	0	1	3
9	(Hungary)	15	Tamás Hajnal	2	0	1	3
10	(Austria)	66	Emir Dilaver	2	0	0	2
11	(South Korea)	18	Ryu Seung-woo	1	0	1	2
12	(Poland)	27	Michał Nalepa	1	0	1	2
13	(Hungary)	10	András Radó	0	0	2	2
14	(Hungary)	11	István Bognár	0	0	2	2
15	(Hungary)	3	Norbert Kundrák	0	0	2	2
16	(Hungary)	14	Dominik Nagy	1	0	0	1
17	(Germany)	37	Janek Sternberg	1	0	0	1
18	(Hungary)	8	Gergő Lovrencsics	1	0	0	1
19	(Serbia)	30	Vladan Čukić	0	0	1	1
20	(Hungary)	19	Gábor Gyömbér	0	0	1	1
/	/	/	Own Goals	5	0	0	5
			TOTALS	54	2	31	87

=== Disciplinary record ===
Includes all competitive matches. Players with 1 card or more included only.

Last updated on 31 May 2017

Position	Nation	Number	Name	OTP Bank Liga		Champions League		Hungarian Cup		Total (Hu Total)	
Position	Nation	Number	Name	Booked	Sent off (straight red)	Booked	Sent off (straight red)	Booked	Sent off (straight red)	Booked	Sent off (straight red)
DF	(Germany)	5	Oliver Hüsing	3	0	0	0	0	0	3 (3)	0 (0)
MF	(Hungary)	6	László Kleinheisler	1	0	0	0	1	0	2 (1)	0 (0)
DF	(Hungary)	7	Bence Batik	0	0	0	0	1	0	1 (0)	0 (0)
MF	(Hungary)	8	Gergő Lovrencsics	4	0	0	0	1	0	5 (4)	0 (0)
MF	(Hungary)	10	András Radó	2	0	0	0	0	0	2 (2)	0 (0)
FW	(Slovakia)	11	Stanislav Šesták	1	0	0	0	0	0	1 (1)	0 (0)
FW	(Hungary)	13	Dániel Böde	3	0	1	0	0	0	4 (3)	0 (0)
MF	(Hungary)	14	Dominik Nagy	8	0	0	0	0	0	8 (8)	0 (0)
MF	(Hungary)	15	Tamás Hajnal	5	0	0	0	0	0	5 (5)	0 (0)
DF	(Hungary)	16	Leandro	3	0	0	0	1	0	4 (3)	0 (0)
MF	(Hungary)	17	Ádám Pintér	3	0	0	0	0	0	3 (3)	0 (0)
MF	(Germany)	19	Julian Koch	1	0	0	0	0	0	1 (1)	0 (0)
MF	(Hungary)	19	Gábor Gyömbér	1	0	0	0	0	0	1 (1)	0 (0)
MF	(Hungary)	20	Zoltán Gera	7	0	1	0	1	0	9 (7)	0 (0)
DF	(Hungary)	21	Endre Botka	2	0	0	0	1	0	3 (2)	0 (0)
MF	(Hungary)	22	Attila Busai	0	0	0	0	1	0	1 (0)	0 (0)
FW	(Austria)	23	Marco Djuricin	6	0	0	0	2	0	9 (6)	0 (0)
DF	(Poland)	27	Michał Nalepa	8	2	1	0	0	0	9 (8)	2 (2)
MF	(Serbia)	30	Vladan Čukić	6	1	0	0	3	0	9 (6)	1 (1)
FW	(Germany)	35	Florian Trinks	3	0	0	0	0	0	3 (3)	0 (0)
DF	(Germany)	37	Janek Sternberg	5	0	0	0	2	0	7 (5)	0 (0)
FW	(Niger)	40	Amadou Moutari	3	0	0	0	2	0	5 (3)	0 (0)
DF	(Austria)	66	Emir Dilaver	6	1	2	0	0	0	8 (6)	1 (1)
DF	(Ecuador)	77	Cristian Ramírez	6	1	2	0	1	0	9 (6)	1 (1)
GK	(Hungary)	90	Dénes Dibusz	0	0	0	0	1	0	1 (0)	0 (0)
FW	(Hungary)	97	Roland Varga	1	0	0	0	1	0	2 (1)	0 (0)
			TOTALS	88	5	7	0	19	0	114 (88)	5 (5)

=== Overall ===
Games played	45 (33 OTP Bank Liga, 2 Champions League and 10 Hungarian Cup)
Games won	22 (14 OTP Bank Liga, 0 Champions League and 8 Hungarian Cup)
Games drawn	14 (10 OTP Bank Liga, 2 Champions League and 2 Hungarian Cup)
Games lost	9 (9 OTP Bank Liga, 0 Champions League and 0 Hungarian Cup)
Goals scored	87
Goals conceded	52
Goal difference	+35
Yellow cards	114
Red cards	5
Worst discipline	(Poland) Michał Nalepa (8 (yellow card) , 2 (red card) )
Best result	9–0 (A) v Koroncó - Hungarian Cup - 26-10-2016
Worst result	1–4 (A) v Videoton - OTP Bank Liga - 20-05-2017
Most appearances	(Austria) Emir Dilaver (40 appearances)
Top scorer	(Hungary) Dániel Böde (16 goals)
Points	80/135 (59.26%)

Last updated: 31 May 2017

== Nemzeti Bajnokság I ==
=== Matches ===
16 July 2016 1	Ferencváros	3 – 1	Szombathelyi Haladás	Budapest, Pest County
20:30 CEST	Trinks 3'; Böde 7', 36'	Report	Iszlai 52'	Stadium: Groupama Arena; Attendance: 5,642; Referee: (Hungary) Péter Solymosi

23 July 2016 2	Budapest Honvéd	0 – 1	Ferencváros	Budapest, Pest County
20:30 CEST		Report	Böde 43'	Stadium: Bozsik Stadion; Attendance: 2,384; Referee: (Hungary) Viktor Kassai

30 July 2016 3	Ferencváros	6 – 2	Diósgyőr	Budapest, Pest County
20:30 CEST	Trinks 33'; Leandro 51'; Djuricin 63', 86'; Dilaver 67'; Gera 84'	Report	Vela 78'; Tamás 90'	Stadium: Groupama Arena; Attendance: 6,736; Referee: (Hungary) Tamás Bognár

6 August 2016 4	Paks	0 – 0	Ferencváros	Paks, Tolna County
18:00 CEST		Report		Stadium: Fehérvári úti Stadion; Attendance: 4,217; Referee: (Hungary) Sándor Andó-Szabó

13 August 2016 5	Ferencváros	1 – 2	Vasas	Budapest, Pest County
20:30 CEST	Trinks 45'	Report	Vaskó 28'; Pavlov 89'	Stadium: Groupama Arena; Attendance: 6,843; Referee: (Hungary) Zoltán Iványi

17 August 2016 6	Gyirmót	0 – 1	Ferencváros	Győr, Győr-Moson-Sopron County
19:00 CEST		Report	Böde 18'	Stadium: Ménfői úti Stadion; Attendance: 4,000; Referee: (Hungary) Gergely Szőts

21 August 2016 7	Ferencváros	2 – 2	Mezőkövesd	Budapest, Pest County
18:00 CEST	Djuricin 9'; Nagy 84'	Report	Hudák 63'; Bačelić-Grgić 79'	Stadium: Groupama Arena; Attendance: 5,242; Referee: (Hungary) Tamás Bognár

10 September 2016 8	MTK	2 – 1	Ferencváros	Dunaújváros, Fejér County
20:30 CEST	Gera 34'; Torghelle 90+2' (pen.)	Report	Ryu 70'	Stadium: Eszperantó úti Stadion; Attendance: 1,117; Referee: (Hungary) Ferenc Karakó

17 September 2016 9	Ferencváros	3 – 1	Debrecen	Budapest, Pest County
20:30 CEST	Böde 14', 65'; Dilaver 62'	Report	Bobko 16'	Stadium: Groupama Arena; Attendance: 5,198; Referee: (Hungary) Zsolt Szabó

21 September 2016 10	Videoton	1 – 1	Ferencváros	Felcsút, Fejér County
20:00 CEST	Šćepović 53' (pen.)	Report	Djuricin 83'	Stadium: Pancho Aréna; Attendance: 3,112; Referee: (Hungary) Sándor Andó-Szabó

24 September 2016 11	Ferencváros	3 – 3	Újpest	Budapest, Pest County
20:30 CEST	Djuricin 10'; Leandro 60'; Pávkovics 65' (o.g.)	Report	Diarra 20'; Balogh 38', 53' (pen.)	Stadium: Groupama Arena; Attendance: 11,760; Referee: (Hungary) Viktor Kassai

15 October 2016 12	Szombathelyi Haladás	2 – 0	Ferencváros	Sopron, Győr-Moson-Sopron County
18:00 CEST	Gaál 64'; Iszlai 84'	Report		Stadium: Káposztás utcai Stadion; Attendance: 4,138; Referee: (Hungary) Péter Solymosi

22 October 2016 13	Ferencváros	3 – 2	Budapest Honvéd	Budapest, Pest County
18:00 CEST	Böde 26'; Hajnal 44'; Djuricin 60'	Report	Kamber 73'; Lanzafame 78' (pen.)	Stadium: Groupama Arena; Attendance: 7,072; Referee: (Hungary) Ferenc Karakó

29 October 2016 14	Diósgyőr	2 – 3	Ferencváros	Miskolc, Borsod-Abaúj-Zemplén County
17:30 CEST	Novothny 41'; Nono 57'	Report	Jagodinskis 19' (o.g.); Busai 30'; Nalepa 65'	Stadium: Diósgyőri Stadion; Attendance: 8,052; Referee: (Hungary) Zsolt Szabó

5 November 2016 15	Ferencváros	1 – 2	Paks	Budapest, Pest County
15:30 CET	Busai 86'	Report	Hahn 14'; Koltai 57'	Stadium: Groupama Arena; Attendance: 5,592; Referee: (Hungary) Csaba Pintér

19 November 2016 16	Vasas	2 – 2	Ferencváros	Budapest, Pest County
18:00 CET	Ferenczi 88' (pen.), 90+3'	Report	Djuricin 9'; Gera 90+2' (pen.)	Stadium: Bozsik Stadion; Attendance: 3,425; Referee: (Hungary) Viktor Kassai

26 November 2016 17	Ferencváros	2 – 0	Gyirmót	Budapest, Pest County
15:30 CET	Présinger 48' (o.g.); Djuricin 65'	Report		Stadium: Groupama Arena; Attendance: 5,613; Referee: (Hungary) Ferenc Karakó

3 December 2016 18	Mezőkövesd	2 – 0	Ferencváros	Mezőkövesd, Borsod-Abaúj-Zemplén County
15:30 CET	Molnár 44'; Bačelić-Grgić 81' (pen.)	Report		Stadium: Városi Stadion; Attendance: 3,562; Referee: (Hungary) Zsolt Szabó

10 December 2016 19	Ferencváros	1 – 1	MTK	Budapest, Pest County
18:00 CET	Baki 36' (o.g.)	Report	Torghelle 82'	Stadium: Groupama Arena; Attendance: 4,754; Referee: (Hungary) Sándor Andó-Szabó

18 February 2017 20	Debrecen	0 – 0	Ferencváros	Debrecen, Hajdú-Bihar County
15:30 CET		Report		Stadium: Nagyerdei Stadion; Attendance: 7,138; Referee: (Hungary) Ádám Farkas

25 February 2017 21	Ferencváros	0 – 0	Videoton	Budapest, Pest County
18:00 CET		Report		Stadium: Groupama Arena; Attendance: 8,725; Referee: (Hungary) Zsolt Szabó

4 March 2017 22	Újpest	0 – 1	Ferencváros	Budapest, Pest County
18:00 CET		Report	Gera 35'	Stadium: Szusza Ferenc Stadion; Attendance: 8,005; Referee: (Hungary) Ádám Farkas

11 March 2017 23	Ferencváros	3 – 1	Szombathelyi Haladás	Budapest, Pest County
18:00 CET	Moutari 1'; Gera 20' (pen.); Böde 43'	Report	Jancsó 69'	Stadium: Groupama Arena; Attendance: 6,983; Referee: (Hungary) Gergely Szőts

1 April 2017 24	Budapest Honvéd	2 – 1	Ferencváros	Budapest, Pest County
20:30 CEST	Zsótér 20'; Eppel 32'	Report	Moutari 39'	Stadium: Bozsik Stadion; Attendance: 5,697; Referee: (Hungary) Péter Solymosi

8 April 2017 25	Ferencváros	1 – 1	Diósgyőr	Budapest, Pest County
20:30 CEST	Varga 77'	Report	Tamás 46'	Stadium: Groupama Arena; Attendance: 6,235; Referee: (Hungary) Sándor Andó-Szabó

12 April 2017 26	Paks	3 – 1	Ferencváros	Paks, Tolna County
18:00 CEST	Bartha 29'; Haraszti 43'; Hajdú 79'	Report	Böde 88'	Stadium: Fehérvári úti Stadion; Attendance: 3,500; Referee: (Hungary) Viktor Kassai

15 April 2017 27	Ferencváros	1 – 2	Vasas	Budapest, Pest County
20:30 CEST	Sternberg 46'	Report	Berecz 54'; Sağlık 56'	Stadium: Groupama Arena; Attendance: 5,044; Referee: (Hungary) Ádám Farkas

22 April 2017 28	Gyirmót	2 – 3	Ferencváros	Győr, Győr-Moson-Sopron County
18:00 CEST	Novák 21'; Tamás 77'	Report	Gera 36', 38', 61' (pen.)	Stadium: Ménfői úti Stadion; Attendance: 1,952; Referee: (Hungary) István Vad

29 April 2017 29	Ferencváros	3 – 1	Mezőkövesd	Budapest, Pest County
18:00 CEST	Böde 20', 29'; Gera 23'	Report	Molnár 38'	Stadium: Groupama Arena; Attendance: 5,875; Referee: (Hungary) Balázs Berke

6 May 2017 30	MTK	1 – 3	Ferencváros	Budapest, Pest County
20:30 CEST	Myke 80'	Report	Varga 10'; Lovrencsics 31'; Moutari 45'	Stadium: Hidegkuti Nándor Stadion; Attendance: 4,368; Referee: (Hungary) Tamás Bognár

13 May 2017 31	Ferencváros	0 – 0	Debrecen	Budapest, Pest County
18:00 CEST		Report		Stadium: Groupama Arena; Attendance: 6,596; Referee: (Hungary) Csaba Pintér

20 May 2017 32	Videoton	4 – 1	Ferencváros	Felcsút, Fejér County
20:30 CEST	Lazović 36'; Stopira 42'; Koch 45' (o.g.); Marić 90+3'	Report	Nego 7' (o.g.)	Stadium: Pancho Aréna; Attendance: 3,208; Referee: (Hungary) Zoltán Iványi

27 May 2017 33	Ferencváros	2 – 0	Újpest	Budapest, Pest County
19:00 CEST	Hajnal 32' (pen.); Varga 60'	Report		Stadium: Groupama Arena; Attendance: 10,341; Referee: (Hungary) Ádám Farkas

=== League table ===
Pos	Team	Pld	W	D	L	GF	GA	GD	Pts	Qualification or relegation
2	Videoton	33	18	8	7	65	28	+37	62	Qualification for the Europa League first qualifying round (Note: Ferencváros qualified for the Europa League first qualifying round by winning the 2016–17 Magyar Kupa.)
3	Vasas	33	15	7	11	50	40	+10	52	Qualification for the Europa League first qualifying round
4	Ferencváros	33	14	10	9	54	44	+10	52	Qualification for the Europa League first qualifying round
5	Paks	33	11	12	10	41	37	+4	45	
6	Haladás	33	12	7	14	42	46	−4	43	

Source: Hungarian Football Federation (in Hungarian), Soccerway
Rules for classification: 1) Points; 2) Matches won; 3) Goal difference; 4) Goals scored; 5) Head-to-head points; 6) Head-to-head goal difference; 7) Head-to-head away goals scored; 8) Fairplay; 9) Draw.

=== Results summary ===
Overall								Home						Away					
Pld	W	D	L	GF	GA	GD	Pts	W	D	L	GF	GA	GD	W	D	L	GF	GA	GD
33	14	10	9	54	44	+10	52	8	6	3	35	21	+14	6	4	6	19	23	−4

Last updated: 27 May 2017.
Source: NB1

=== Results by round ===
Round	1	2	3	4	5	6	7	8	9	10	11	12	13	14	15	16	17	18	19	20	21	22	23	24	25	26	27	28	29	30	31	32	33
Ground	H	A	H	A	H	A	H	A	H	A	H	A	H	A	H	A	H	A	H	A	H	A	H	A	H	A	H	A	H	A	H	A	H
Result	W	W	W	D	L	W	D	L	W	D	D	L	W	W	L	D	W	L	D	D	D	W	W	L	D	L	L	W	W	W	D	L	W
Position	1	1	1	1	2	2	2	2	2	2	3	4	3	2	3	3	3	4	4	4	4	4	4	4	4	4	5	4	4	3	3	4	4

Updated to match(es) played on 27 May 2017. Source: Matches
A = Away; H = Home; W = Win; D = Draw; L = Loss

== Hungarian Cup ==
14 September 2016 Round 1	BKV Előre	0 – 1	Ferencváros	Budapest, Pest County
15:30 CEST		Report	Čukić 30'	Stadium: Sport utcai stadium Attendance: 600; Referee: (Hungary) Ádám Radványi

26 October 2016 Round 2	Koroncó	0 – 9	Ferencváros	Koroncó, Győr-Moson-Sopron County
13:30 CEST		Report	Busai 17', 44', 57', 88'; Trinks 29'; Radó 52', 86'; Ryu 53'; Gyömbér 60'	Stadium: Koroncó SE Sportpálya; Attendance: 2,500; Referee: (Hungary) Gergely Kovács

30 November 2016 Round of 32	Puskás Akadémia	1 – 2 (a.e.t.)	Ferencváros	Felcsút, Fejér County
18:00 CET	Tischler 66'	Report	Djuricin 28'; Gera 105' (pen.)	Stadium: Pancho Aréna; Referee: (Hungary) Ádám Németh

11 February 2017 Round of 16	Ferencváros	2 – 1	Budapest Honvéd	Budapest, Pest County
18:00 CET	Moutari 32'; Leandro 51'	Report	Lanzafame 88'	Stadium: Groupama Arena; Attendance: 6,817; Referee: (Hungary) Zoltán Iványi

1 March 2017 Round of 16	Budapest Honvéd	0 – 2 (1 – 4 agg.)	Ferencváros	Budapest, Pest County
20:30 CET		Report	Nalepa 30'; Böde 51'	Stadium: Bozsik Stadion; Attendance: 3,128; Referee: (Hungary) Tamás Bognár

29 March 2017 Quarter-final	Ferencváros	2 – 1	Diósgyőr	Budapest, Pest County
19:00 CEST	Böde 65'; Moutari 90+2'	Report	Ugrai 13' (pen.)	Stadium: Groupama Arena; Attendance: 4,452; Referee: (Hungary) József Erdős

4 April 2017 Quarter-final	Diósgyőr	0 – 0 (1 – 2 agg.)	Ferencváros	Mezőkövesd, Borsod-Abaúj-Zemplén County
19:45 CEST		Report		Stadium: Városi Stadion; Attendance: 2,387; Referee: (Hungary) Zsolt Szabó

26 April 2017 Semi-final	Ferencváros	8 – 0	Budafok	Budapest, Pest County
18:00 CEST	Bognár 13', 40'; Böde 26', 55'; Varga 38'; Moutari 43'; Djuricin 57', 58'	Report		Stadium: Groupama Arena; Attendance: 4,055; Referee: (Hungary) Ferenc Karakó

17 May 2017 Semi-final	Budafok	2 – 4 (2 – 12 agg.)	Ferencváros	Budapest, Pest County
15:00 CEST	Csizmadia 25'; Kovács 49'	Report	Kundrák 21', 33'; Hajnal 30' (pen.); Moutari 71'	Stadium: Promontor utcai Stadion; Attendance: 3,000; Referee: (Hungary) Ádám Radványi

31 May 2017 Final	Vasas	1 – 1 (a.e.t.) (4 – 5 p)	Ferencváros	Budapest, Pest County
19:00 CEST	Kulcsár 47'	Report	Varga 25'	Stadium: Groupama Arena; Attendance: 14,970; Referee: (Hungary) Péter Solymosi
	Penalties
	Remili (penalty scored); Berecz (penalty scored); Ristevski (penalty missed); Vida (penalty scored); Gaál (penalty scored)		Varga (penalty scored); Leandro (penalty scored); Radó (penalty scored); Sternberg (penalty scored); Čukić (penalty scored)

== UEFA Champions League ==
The First and Second Qualifying Round draws took place at UEFA headquarters in Nyon, Switzerland on 20 June 2016.

13 July 2016 Q2 Leg 1	Partizani Tirana (Albania)	1 – 1	(Hungary) Ferencváros	Elbasan
20:00 CEST	Fili 47'	Report	Böde 71'	Stadium: Elbasan Arena; Attendance: 1,700; Referee: (France) Benoît Millot

20 July 2016 Q2 Leg 2	Ferencváros (Hungary)	1 – 1 (1–3 p)	(Albania) Partizani Tirana	Budapest
19:30 CEST	Gera 14' (pen.)	Report	Hüsing 40' (o.g.)	Stadium: Groupama Arena; Attendance: 8,752; Referee: (Estonia) Kristo Tohver
	Penalties
	Gera (penalty missed); Šesták (penalty missed); Nagy (penalty scored); Ramírez (penalty missed)		(penalty scored) Hoxha; (penalty missed) Vila; (penalty scored) Trashi; (penalty scored) Ekuban
