= Patrik Popov =

Hungarian footballer (born 1997)

Personal information
- Date of birth: 12 October 1997 (age 29)
- Place of birth: Budapest, Hungary
- Height: 1.85 m (6 ft 1 in)
- Position: Forward

Team information
- Current team: Bugyi
- Number: 9

Youth career
- 2005–2014: Ferencváros

Senior career*
Years	Team	Apps	(Gls)
2014–2016	Ferencváros II	50	(26)
2014–2018	Ferencváros	1	(0)
2017	→ Soroksár (loan)	5	(0)
2018	→ Soroksár (loan)	8	(0)
2018–2019	Soroksár	1	(0)
2019	Rákospalota	12	(10)
2019–2020	Dabas	16	(5)
2020–2021	Érd	24	(7)
2021–2022	Mosonmagyaróvár	17	(2)
2021–2022	Mosonmagyaróvár II	9	(1)
2022–2023	Budaörs	15	(6)
2023	BKV Előre	17	(5)
2023–2024	SZAC	12	(5)
2024–	Bugyi	40	(21)

International career
2015	Hungary U-18	3	(2)
2015	Hungary U-19	4	(0)
2015	Hungary U-20	2	(0)
- * Club domestic league appearances and goals as of 6 September 2025

Patrik Popov (born 12 October 1997) is a Hungarian professional footballer, who plays as a forward for Megyei Bajnokság I club Bugyi. He was also part of the Hungarian U-20 team at the 2015 FIFA U-20 World Cup.

== Career statistics ==
As of match played 6 September 2025

Appearances and goals by club, season and competition
Club	Season	League			Magyar Kupa		Ligakupa		Other		Total	
Club	Season	Division	Apps	Goals	Apps	Goals	Apps	Goals	Apps	Goals	Apps	Goals
Ferencváros II	2013–14	Nemzeti Bajnokság III	2	1	—		—		—		2	1
Ferencváros II	2015–16	Nemzeti Bajnokság III	29	17	—		—		—		29	17
Ferencváros II	2016–17	Nemzeti Bajnokság III	19	8	—		—		—		19	8
Ferencváros II	Total		50	26	—		—		—		50	26
Ferencváros	2014–15	Nemzeti Bajnokság I	1	0	—		7	2	—		8	2
Ferencváros	2015–16	Nemzeti Bajnokság I	0	0	1	0	—		0	0	1	0
Ferencváros	2016–17	Nemzeti Bajnokság I	—		0	0	—		—		0	0
Ferencváros	Total		1	0	1	0	7	2	0	0	9	2
Soroksár (loan)	2016–17	Nemzeti Bajnokság II	5	0	—		—		—		5	0
Soroksár (loan)	2017–18	Nemzeti Bajnokság II	8	0	—		—		—		8	0
Soroksár	2018–19	Nemzeti Bajnokság II	1	0	1	0	—		—		2	0
Soroksár	Soroksár total		14	0	1	0	—		—		15	0
Rákospalota	2018–19	Megyei Bajnokság I	12	10	—		—		3 (Note: Appearances in Budapest Kupa)	3	15	13
Dabas	2019–20	Nemzeti Bajnokság III	16	5	2	2	—		—		18	7
Érd	2020–21	Nemzeti Bajnokság III	24	7	1	1	—		—		25	8
Mosonmagyaróvár	2021–22	Nemzeti Bajnokság III	17	2	2	2	—		—		19	4
Mosonmagyaróvár II	2021–22	Megyei Bajnokság I	9	1	—		—		—		9	1
Budaörs	2022–23	Nemzeti Bajnokság III	15	6	2	0	—		—		17	6
BKV Előre	2022–23	Nemzeti Bajnokság III	17	5	—		—		—		17	5
SZAC	2023–24	Megyei Bajnokság I	12	5	—		—		—		12	5
Bugyi	2023–24	Megyei Bajnokság I	14	4	—		—		—		14	4
Bugyi	2024–25	Megyei Bajnokság I	23	17	—		—		—		23	17
Bugyi	2025–26	Megyei Bajnokság I	3	0	—		—		—		3	0
Bugyi	Total		40	21	—		—		—		40	21
Career total			227	88	9	5	7	2	3	3	246	98

== Honours ==
Ferencváros

- Magyar Kupa: 2015–16
- Szuperkupa: 2015

Ferencváros II

- Nemzeti Bajnokság III – West: 2015–16

Rákospalota

- Budapest Kupa runner-up: 2018–19

Mosonmagyaróvár

- Nemzeti Bajnokság III – West: 2021–22
