= Michał Nalepa (footballer, born 1993) =

Polish footballer

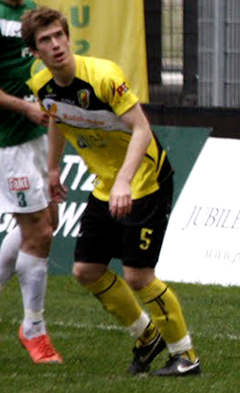
- Nalepa with Ruch Radzionków in 2012

Personal information
- Date of birth: 22 January 1993 (age 33)
- Place of birth: Chrzanów, Poland
- Height: 1.90 m (6 ft 3 in)
- Position: Centre-back

Team information
- Current team: Zagłębie Lubin
- Number: 25

Youth career
- Unia Oświęcim
- 2007–2011: Wisła Kraków

Senior career*
Years	Team	Apps	(Gls)
2011–2014	Wisła Kraków	16	(0)
2011–2012	→ Ruch Radzionków (loan)	21	(1)
2012–2013	→ Termalica Bruk-Bet (loan)	31	(3)
2013–2014	Wisła Kraków II	3	(0)
2014–2017	Ferencváros	73	(2)
2017–2023	Lechia Gdańsk	152	(12)
2023–	Zagłębie Lubin	77	(3)
2023–2024	Zagłębie Lubin II	2	(0)

International career
2008–2009	Poland U16	8	(1)
2009–2010	Poland U17	16	(3)
2010–2011	Poland U18	6	(0)
2011	Poland U19	7	(2)
2012	Poland U20	13	(1)
- * Club domestic league appearances and goals as of 11:27, 16 September 2026 (UTC)

Michał Nalepa (born 22 January 1993) is a Polish professional footballer who plays as a centre-back for Ekstraklasa club Zagłębie Lubin.

== Club career ==
In July 2011, Nalepa joined Ruch Radzionków on a one-season loan deal from Wisła Kraków. He made his league debut for Radzionkow on 13 August 2011 in a 2–2 home draw with GKS Katowice. He was subbed on for Paweł Giel in the 58th minute. He scored his first league goal for the club on 3 September 2011 in a 3–1 away win against Arka Gdynia. His goal, the third of the match, came in the 47th minute. In the 2012–13 season he was loaned out to Bruk-Bet Termalica Nieciecza. He made his league debut for Termalica on 22 August 2012 in a 3–0 away victory over Polonia Bytom. He scored his first goal for the club on 3 November 2012 in a 1–1 away draw with Zawisza Bydgoszcz. His goal, scored in the 90th minute, rescued a point for the visitors that day. On 19 July 2013, Nalepa made his debut for Wisła Kraków in the Ekstraklasa match against Górnik Zabrze.

=== Ferencváros ===
On 7 June 2014, Nalepa signed three-year deal with Hungarian club Ferencvárosi TC. He made his league debut for the club on 27 July 2014 in a 3–1 away win against Kecskeméti TE. He was subbed on in the 83rd minute for Wergiton do Rosario Calmon. He scored his first league goal for the club on 26 July 2015 in a 3–1 home victory over Diósgyőri VTK. His goal, scored in the 5th minute, was the first of the match.

On 2 April 2016, Nalepa became Hungarian League champion with Ferencvárosi TC after losing to Debreceni VSC 2–1 at the Nagyerdei Stadion in the 2015–16 Nemzeti Bajnokság I season.

=== Lechia Gdańsk ===
On 1 July 2017, he became a Lechia Gdańsk player. He made his league debut for the club on 14 July 2017 in a 2–0 away win against Wisła Płock. He scored his first league goal for the club on 8 May 2018 in a 2–0 away win against Piast Gliwice. His goal, the first of the match, came in the 45th minute.

=== Zagłębie Lubin ===
After Lechia's relegation to I liga, Nalepa remained in the top flight after signing a two-year deal with Zagłębie Lubin on 6 July 2023.

== International career ==
Nalepa was the captain of Poland national under-17 football team during 2010 UEFA Under-17 Championship elite round as well as of Poland national under-19 football team during 2012 UEFA Under-19 Championship qualifying round.

== Career statistics ==
As of match played 23 May 2026

Appearances and goals by club, season and competition
Club	Season	League			National cup (Note: Includes Polish Cup, Magyar Kupa)		Europe		Other		Total	
Club	Season	Division	Apps	Goals	Apps	Goals	Apps	Goals	Apps	Goals	Apps	Goals
Ruch Radzionków (loan)	2011–12	I liga	21	1	2	2	—		—		23	3
Termalica Bruk-Bet (loan)	2012–13	I liga	31	3	2	0	—		—		33	3
Wisła Kraków	2013–14	Ekstraklasa	16	0	2	0	—		—		18	0
Wisła Kraków II	2013–14	III liga, gr. G	3	0	—		—		—		3	0
Ferencváros	2014–15	Nemzeti Bajnokság I	23	0	5	0	4 (Note: Appearances in UEFA Europa League)	1	7 (Note: Appearances in Ligakupa)	1	39	2
Ferencváros	2015–16	Nemzeti Bajnokság I	29	1	7	0	4	0	1 (Note: Appearance in Szuperkupa)	0	41	1
Ferencváros	2016–17	Nemzeti Bajnokság I	21	1	8	1	1 (Note: Appearance in UEFA Champions League)	0	—		30	2
Ferencváros	Total		73	2	20	1	9	1	8	1	110	5
Lechia Gdańsk	2017–18	Ekstraklasa	16	1	1	0	—		—		17	1
Lechia Gdańsk	2018–19	Ekstraklasa	35	3	6	1	—		—		41	4
Lechia Gdańsk	2018–20	Ekstraklasa	34	2	6	1	2	0	1 (Note: Appearance in Polish Super Cup)	0	43	3
Lechia Gdańsk	2020–21	Ekstraklasa	16	3	3	0	—		—		19	3
Lechia Gdańsk	2021–22	Ekstraklasa	28	1	1	0	—		—		29	1
Lechia Gdańsk	2022–23	Ekstraklasa	23	2	1	0	3 (Note: Appearance in UEFA Europa Conference League)	0	—		27	2
Lechia Gdańsk	Total		152	12	18	2	5	0	1	0	176	14
Zagłębie Lubin	2023–24	Ekstraklasa	18	0	2	0	—		—		20	0
Zagłębie Lubin	2024–25	Ekstraklasa	22	0	3	1	—		—		25	1
Zagłębie Lubin	2025–26	Ekstraklasa	31	2	1	0	—		—		32	2
Zagłębie Lubin	Total		71	2	6	1	—		—		77	3
Zagłębie Lubin II	2023–24	II liga	1	0	0	0	—		—		1	0
Zagłębie Lubin II	2024–25	II liga	1	0	0	0	—		—		1	0
Zagłębie Lubin II	Total		2	0	0	0	—		—		2	0
Career total			369	20	50	6	14	1	9	1	442	28

== Honours ==
Ferencváros

- Nemzeti Bajnokság I: 2015-16
- Hungarian Cup: 2014–15, 2015–16, 2016-17
- Hungarian League Cup: 2014–15
- Hungarian Super Cup: 2015

Lechia Gdańsk

- Polish Cup: 2018–19
- Polish Super Cup: 2019
