= Emir Dilaver =

Austrian professional footballer

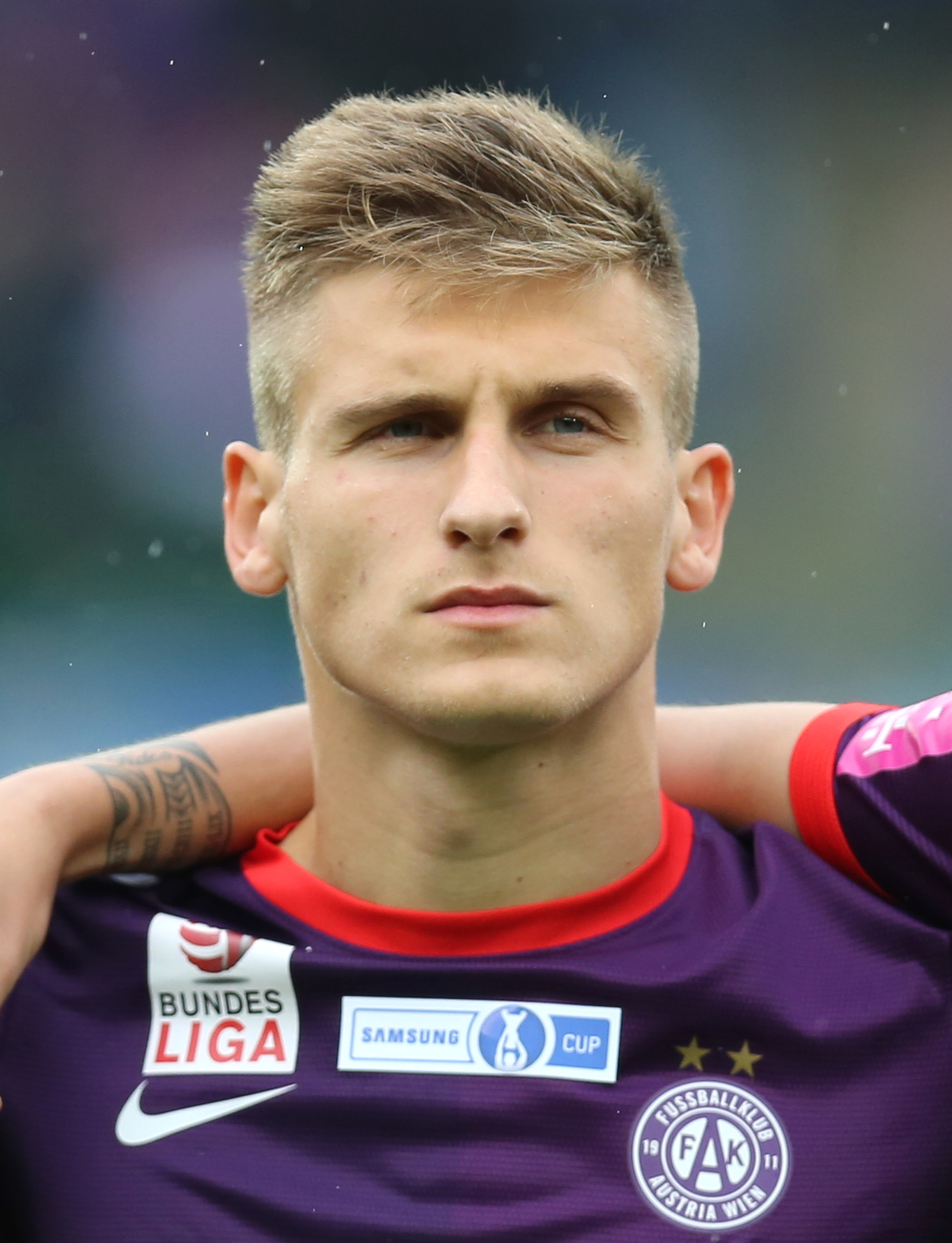
- Dilaver with Austria Wien in 2013

Personal information
- Full name: Emir Dilaver
- Date of birth: 7 May 1991 (age 35)
- Place of birth: Tomislavgrad, SR Bosnia and Herzegovina, Yugoslavia
- Height: 1.84 m (6 ft 0 in)
- Position: Centre back

Youth career
- 2001–2009: Austria Wien

Senior career*
| Years | Team | Apps | (Gls) |
| 2009–2014 | Austria Wien | 70 | (2) |
| 2009–2012 | Austria Wien II | 48 | (5) |
| 2009 | → Wienerberg (loan) | 11 | (0) |
| 2014–2017 | Ferencváros | 86 | (2) |
| 2017–2018 | Lech Poznań | 32 | (3) |
| 2018–2020 | Dinamo Zagreb | 42 | (1) |
| 2020–2021 | Çaykur Rizespor | 25 | (0) |
| 2021–2022 | Dinamo Zagreb | 7 | (0) |
| 2022–2024 | Rijeka | 31 | (0) |

International career
| 2009 | Austria U18 | 1 | (1) |
| 2010 | Austria U19 | 6 | (0) |
| 2011 | Austria U20 | 3 | (0) |
| 2010–2012 | Austria U21 | 15 | (0) |
- * Club domestic league appearances and goals as of 19 May 2024

Emir Dilaver (Bosnian pronunciation: [ěmir dǐlaːʋer]; born 7 May 1991) is a Bosnian-Austrian professional footballer who plays as a centre back. He last played for Croatian Football League club Rijeka.

Dilaver started his professional career at Austria Wien, who loaned him to Wienerberg in 2009. In 2014, he joined Ferencváros. In 2017, he moved to Lech Poznań. The following year, he was transferred to Dinamo Zagreb.

== Club career ==
=== Early career ===
Dilaver came through Austria Wien's youth academy. He made his professional debut playing for Wienerberg in 2009 at the age of 17.

Dilaver made his UEFA Champions League debut against Atlético Madrid on 22 October 2013.

=== Ferencváros ===
In June 2014, Dilaver moved to Hungarian team Ferencváros on a three-year contract. He made his debut for the team on 27 July against Kecskemét.

Dilaver won his first trophy with the club on 20 May 2015, by beating Fehérvár in Magyar Kupa final.

Over a year later, he scored his first goal for Ferencváros against Diósgyőr.

=== Lech Poznań ===
In June 2017, Dilaver signed a four-year deal with Polish club Lech Poznań. On 16 July, he made his official debut for the side against Sandecja. He scored his first goal for Lech Poznań against Cracovia, which turned out to be the winning goal in the game.

=== Dinamo Zagreb ===
On 29 May 2018, Dilaver was transferred to Croatian outfit Dinamo Zagreb for an undisclosed fee. He made his competitive debut for the team on 24 July in UEFA Champions League qualifier against Hapoel Be'er Sheva. A week later, he made his league debut against Istra 1961. Dilaver scored his first goal for Dinamo Zagreb in UEFA Europa League game against Viktoria Plzeň on 21 February 2019. Dilaver won his first trophy with the club on 19 April, when they were crowned league champions.

== International career ==
Despite representing Austria at various youth levels, Dilaver decided to play for Bosnia and Herzegovina at senior level.

== Career statistics ==
As of match played 18 December 2019

Appearances and goals by club, season and competition
| Club | Season | League | | | National cup (Note: Includes Austrian Cup, Magyar Kupa, Polish Cup, Croatian Cup) | | League cup (Note: Includes Ligakupa) | | Continental | | Total | |
| Club | Season | Division | Apps | Goals | Apps | Goals | Apps | Goals | Apps | Goals | Apps | Goals |
|---|---|---|---|---|---|---|---|---|---|---|---|---|
| Wienerberg (loan) | 2008–09 | Austrian Regionalliga East | 11 | 0 | — | | — | | — | | 11 | 0 |
| Austria Wien II | 2009–10 | Austrian Second League | 27 | 1 | 1 | 0 | — | | — | | 28 | 1 |
| Austria Wien II | 2010–11 | Austrian Regionalliga East | 17 | 2 | 2 | 0 | — | | — | | 19 | 2 |
| Austria Wien II | 2011–12 | Austrian Regionalliga East | 3 | 2 | 0 | 0 | — | | — | | 19 | 2 |
| Austria Wien II | 2012–13 | Austrian Regionalliga East | 1 | 0 | — | | — | | — | | 1 | 0 |
| Austria Wien II | Total | | 48 | 5 | 3 | 0 | — | | — | | 51 | 5 |
| Austria Wien | 2010–11 | Austrian Bundesliga | 3 | 0 | 0 | 0 | — | | 0 | 0 | 3 | 0 |
| Austria Wien | 2011–12 | Austrian Bundesliga | 19 | 0 | 3 | 0 | — | | 1 (Note: Appearance(s) in UEFA Europa League) | 0 | 23 | 0 |
| Austria Wien | 2012–13 | Austrian Bundesliga | 26 | 2 | 4 | 0 | — | | — | | 30 | 2 |
| Austria Wien | 2013–14 | Austrian Bundesliga | 22 | 0 | 2 | 0 | — | | 5 (Note: Appearances in UEFA Champions League) | 0 | 29 | 0 |
| Austria Wien | Total | | 70 | 2 | 9 | 0 | — | | 6 | 0 | 85 | 2 |
| Ferencváros | 2014–15 | Nemzeti Bajnokság I | 29 | 0 | 7 | 0 | 5 | 0 | 3 | 0 | 44 | 0 |
| Ferencváros | 2015–16 | Nemzeti Bajnokság I | 27 | 0 | 7 | 0 | — | | 3 | 0 | 37 | 0 |
| Ferencváros | 2016–17 | Nemzeti Bajnokság I | 30 | 2 | 8 | 0 | — | | 2 | 0 | 40 | 2 |
| Ferencváros | Total | | 86 | 2 | 22 | 0 | 5 | 0 | 8 | 0 | 121 | 2 |
| Lech Poznań | 2017–18 | Ekstraklasa | 32 | 3 | 1 | 0 | — | | 4 | 0 | 37 | 3 |
| Dinamo Zagreb | 2018–19 | 1. HNL | 18 | 0 | 3 | 0 | — | | 14 (Note: Six appearances in UEFA Champions League, eight appearances and one goal in UEFA Europa League) | 1 | 35 | 1 |
| Dinamo Zagreb | 2019–20 | 1. HNL | 11 | 0 | 0 | 0 | — | | 9 | 0 | 20 | 0 |
| Dinamo Zagreb | Total | | 29 | 0 | 3 | 0 | — | | 23 | 1 | 55 | 1 |
| Career total | | | 276 | 12 | 38 | 0 | 5 | 0 | 41 | 1 | 360 | 13 |

== Honours ==
Austria Wien

- Austrian Bundesliga: 2012–13

Ferencváros

- Nemzeti Bajnokság I: 2015–16
- Magyar Kupa: 2014–15, 2015–16, 2016–17
- Ligakupa: 2014–15

Dinamo Zagreb

- 1. HNL: 2018–19, 2019–20, 2021–22
