= Stjepan Kukuruzović =

Swiss footballer

Personal information
- Date of birth: 7 June 1989 (age 37)
- Place of birth: Thun, Switzerland
- Height: 1.76 m (5 ft 9 in)
- Position: Midfielder

Youth career
- Lerchenfeld
- Thun

Senior career*
Years	Team	Apps	(Gls)
2008–2009	Thun	50	(10)
2009–2014	Zürich	82	(8)
2010	→ Thun (loan)	16	(5)
2014–2015	Ferencváros	11	(1)
2015–2017	Vaduz	70	(9)
2017–2018	St. Gallen	31	(4)
2018–2024	Lausanne-Sport	150	(15)
- * Club domestic league appearances and goals as of 27 May 2024

Stjepan Kukuruzović (born 7 June 1989) is a Croatian professional footballer who plays as a midfielder.

== Club statistics ==
As of 8 January 2022

Club	Season	League		Cup		League Cup		Europe		Total	
Club	Season	Apps	Goals	Apps	Goals	Apps	Goals	Apps	Goals	Apps	Goals
Thun	2008–09	20	3	1	0	0	0	0	0	21	3
Thun	2009–10	30	7	4	1	0	0	0	0	34	8
Thun	Total	50	10	5	1	0	0	0	0	55	11
Zürich	2010–11	27	1	3	0	0	0	0	0	30	1
Zürich	2011–12	9	2	0	0	0	0	2	0	11	2
Zürich	2012–13	28	5	3	0	0	0	0	0	31	5
Zürich	2013–14	18	0	3	1	0	0	1	0	22	1
Zürich	Total	82	8	9	1	0	0	3	0	94	9
Ferencváros	2014–15	11	1	3	3	4	0	4	0	22	4
Vaduz	2015–16	35	4	1	0	0	0	4	0	40	4
Vaduz	2016–17	35	5	3	5	0	0	4	0	42	10
Vaduz	Total	70	9	4	5	0	0	8	0	82	14
St. Gallen	2017–18	29	2	2	0	0	0	0	0	31	2
St. Gallen	2018–19	2	2	0	0	0	0	0	0	2	2
St. Gallen	Total	31	4	2	0	0	0	0	0	33	4
Lausanne-Sport	2018–19	29	1	1	0	0	0	0	0	30	1
Lausanne-Sport	2019–20	35	3	4	3	0	0	0	0	39	6
Lausanne-Sport	2020–21	34	3	1	0	0	0	0	0	35	3
Lausanne-Sport	2020–21	19	4	2	0	0	0	0	0	21	4
Lausanne-Sport	Total	117	11	8	3	0	0	0	0	125	14
Career total		361	43	31	13	4	0	15	0	411	56

== Honours ==
FC Thun

- Swiss Challenge League: 2009–10

FC Zürich

- Swiss Cup: 2013–14

Ferencváros

- Hungarian Cup: 2014–15
- Hungarian League Cup: 2014–15

FC Vaduz

- Liechtenstein Football Cup: 2015–16, 2016–17
