= Tomislav Havojić =

Croatian footballer

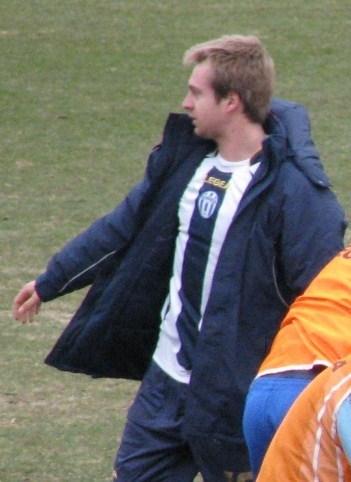

Personal information
- Date of birth: 10 March 1989 (age 37)
- Place of birth: Zagreb, SFR Yugoslavia
- Height: 1.78 m (5 ft 10 in)
- Position: Attacking midfielder

Team information
- Current team: Fürstenfeld
- Number: 27

Youth career
- 1999–2004: Križevci
- 2004–2007: Dinamo Zagreb

Senior career*
Years	Team	Apps	(Gls)
2007–2009	Dinamo Zagreb	1	(0)
2007–2009	→ Lokomotiva (loan)	62	(8)
2010	Lokomotiva	19	(1)
2011	Slaven Belupo	13	(1)
2012–2014	Istra 1961	34	(5)
2014–2015	Ferencváros	3	(0)
2015	Lučko	11	(6)
2016	Spartaks Jūrmala	1	(0)
2016–2018	Rudeš	43	(11)
2018–2019	Lokomotiva	7	(0)
2018–2019	→ Hrvatski Dragovoljac (loan)	21	(3)
2019–2020	Rudeš	16	(6)
2020–2021	Kustošija	32	(3)
2021-	Fürstenfeld	28	(5)

International career^{‡}
2005	Croatia U16	2	(0)
2005	Croatia U17	5	(2)
2007	Croatia U18	4	(0)
2006–2008	Croatia U19	11	(0)
- * Club domestic league appearances and goals as of 27 July 2022 ‡ National team caps and goals as of 5 February 2008

Tomislav Havojić (Croatian pronunciation: [ˈtɔmislaʋ ˈhaʋɔiːtɕ]; born 10 March 1989 in Zagreb, SR Croatia, SFR Yugoslavia) is a Croatian professional footballer, currently playing for SK Fürstenfeld.

== Club career ==
Havojić was a product of Dinamo Zagreb youth school, but spent four years, mostly on loan, at Lokomotiva before joining Slaven Belupo in January 2011. After having his contract with Slaven Belupo terminated in December 2011, he joined Istra 1961.

== Honours ==
- GNK Dinamo Zagreb
  - Prva HNL champions: 2006–07
- Rudeš
  - 2. HNL champions: 2016–17
- Lokomotiva
  - 3. HNL (West) champions: 2007–08
- Ferencvárosi TC
  - Hungarian Cup: 2014–15
  - Hungarian League Cup: 2014–15

== Career statistics ==
Club	Season	League		Cup		Europe		Total	
Club	Season	Apps	Goals	Apps	Goals	Apps	Goals	Apps	Goals
Dinamo Zagreb	2006–07	1	0	–		–		1	0
Lokomotiva (loan)	2007–08	21	6	–		–		21	6
Lokomotiva (loan)	2008–09	28	2	–		–		21	6
Lokomotiva (loan)	2009–10	25	1	–		–		25	1
Lokomotiva (loan)	2010–11	8	0	–		–		8	1
Slaven Belupo	2010–11	7	1	2	0	–		9	1
Slaven Belupo	2011–12	6	0	2	0	–		8	0
Slaven Belupo	Total	95	10	4	0	0	0	99	10
Last Update: 3 December 2011
