= Roland Lamah =

Belgian footballer (born 1987)

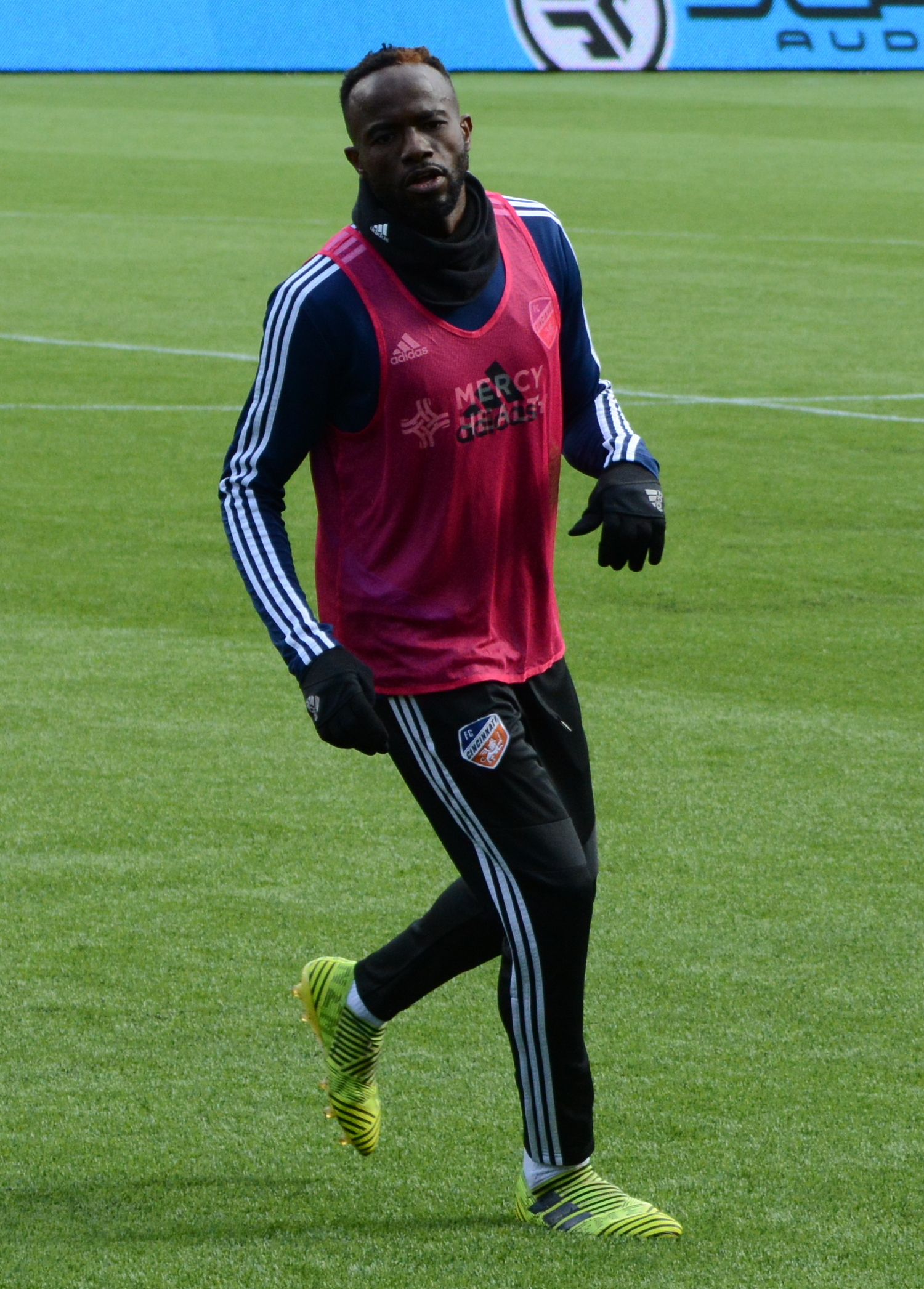
- Lamah with FC Cincinnati in 2019

Personal information
- Full name: Roland Conde Lamah
- Date of birth: 31 December 1987 (age 38)
- Place of birth: Abidjan, Ivory Coast
- Height: 1.82 m (6 ft 0 in)
- Position: Left winger

Youth career
- 1993–2001: Karthala Abidjan
- 2001–2003: Visé

Senior career*
Years	Team	Apps	(Gls)
2003–2005	Visé	17	(1)
2004–2005	→ Anderlecht (loan)	0	(0)
2005–2008	Anderlecht	6	(0)
2007–2008	→ Roda (loan)	32	(11)
2008–2011	Le Mans	92	(10)
2011–2014	Osasuna	45	(3)
2013–2014	→ Swansea City (loan)	14	(2)
2014–2016	Ferencváros	54	(12)
2017–2018	FC Dallas	61	(19)
2019	FC Cincinnati	28	(1)
2021	Memphis 901	13	(4)

International career
2004–2006	Belgium U19	12	(6)
2006	Belgium U20	2	(0)
2007–2008	Belgium U21	6	(1)
2009	Belgium	5	(0)
- * Club domestic league appearances and goals

Roland Conde Lamah (born 31 December 1987) is a former professional footballer who played as a left winger. Born in the Ivory Coast, Lamah represents Belgium internationally.

== Club career ==
=== Early years and Osasuna ===
Born in Abidjan, Ivory Coast, Lamah started playing in Belgium, representing C.S. Visé in the second division and R.S.C. Anderlecht in the Pro League. In the 2007–08 season, he represented Roda JC Kerkrade on loan from the latter.

In the summer of 2008, Lamah moved clubs and countries again, joining France's Le Mans UC 72 on a four-year contract and making his Ligue 1 debut on 30 August by playing one minute in a 4–1 away win against FC Nantes. After suffering relegation in 2010, he competed in Ligue 2 with the team.

On 24 August 2011, after a successful medical, Lamah penned a three-year deal with Spanish side CA Osasuna. he scored four goals all competitions comprised during his one-and-a-half-year spell in Navarre, also being sent off during a 5–1 home loss to Real Madrid in late March 2012.

=== Swansea City ===
On 15 January 2013, Swansea City signed Lamah on an initial 18-month loan after which the Welsh could make it a permanent move. He made his debut four days later, coming on as a 63rd-minute substitute for Pablo Hernández in a 3–1 win over Stoke City at the Liberty Stadium. Also from the bench, he featured 12 minutes to help his team win the League Cup after a 5–0 success against Bradford City.

Lamah scored his first Swansea goal on 29 August 2013 in a UEFA Europa League play-off second leg against Petrolul Ploiești, finishing from a cross by Alejandro Pozuelo in an eventual 2–1 away loss but 6–3 aggregate win. He netted for the first time in the league on 28 December, in a 1–1 draw at Aston Villa. His second goal came against West Bromwich Albion on 15 March 2014, opening the scoring in the second minute of a 2–1 home defeat after being set up by Wilfried Bony.

=== Ferencváros ===
On 9 September 2014, having been released by Osasuna, Lamah signed for Hungarian club Ferencvárosi TC, the move being permitted outside the transfer window as he was a free agent. On 2 April 2016, in spite of a 2–1 away loss against Debreceni VSC, he and his team won the national championship after a 12-year wait.

=== FC Dallas ===
On 16 December 2016, Lamah signed with Major League Soccer side FC Dallas. Lamah was released by Dallas the end of their 2018 season.

=== FC Cincinnati ===
On 11 December 2018, Lamah was selected by FC Cincinnati in the 2018 MLS Expansion Draft, transferring his MLS rights from Dallas. Cincinnati declined Lamah's option at the end of the 2019 season.

=== Memphis 901 ===
In March 2021, Lamah joined Memphis 901 FC of the USL Championship.

== International career ==
Lamah chose to represent Belgium internationally, gaining 20 caps at youth level. He made his debut for the full side on 9 September 2009, coming on as a late substitute for Wesley Sonck in a 2–1 loss in Armenia for the 2010 FIFA World Cup qualifiers.

== Personal life ==
Lamah holds a U.S. green card which qualifies him as a domestic player for MLS roster purposes.

== Honours ==
Anderlecht

- Belgian Pro League: 2006–07

Swansea City

- Football League Cup: 2012–13

Ferencváros

- Magyar Kupa: 2014–15
- Ligakupa: 2014–15

Individual

- 2017 MLS Player of the Week: Week 14
- 2017 MLS Team of the Week: Week 14, Week 19 (Bench), Week 33
- 2018 MLS Team of the Week: Week 3
