= Predrag Bošnjak =

Hungarian footballer

Personal information
- Full name: Predrag Bošnjak
- Date of birth: 13 November 1985 (age 40)
- Place of birth: Subotica, SR Serbia, SFR Yugoslavia
- Height: 1.80 m (5 ft 11 in)
- Position: Defender

Senior career*
Years	Team	Apps	(Gls)
2003–2004	Bačka 1901	29	(0)
2004–2006	Veternik	49	(0)
2006–2008	Novi Sad	48	(2)
2008–2009	Kikinda	17	(0)
2009–2010	Proleter	6	(0)
2010–2011	Nyíregyháza	25	(1)
2011–2013	Veszprém	56	(4)
2013–2014	Haladás	26	(0)
2014–2015	Ferencváros	1	(0)
2015	→ Nyíregyháza (loan)	8	(0)
2015-2023	Haladás	226	(2)

International career^{‡}
2014	Hungary	1	(0)
- * Club domestic league appearances and goals as of 21 December 2023 ‡ National team caps and goals as of 29 July 2018

Predrag Bošnjak (born 13 November 1985) is a Hungarian retired footballer who played as a defender.

== Club career ==
Born as a Serb in Subotica, SR Serbia, SFR Yugoslavia, he played with several Serbian lower league clubs before moving to Hungary in 2010.

== International career ==
In 2014, he made his debut and played his sole international match for the Hungary national team in a friendly match against Albania.
