= Ádám Csilus =

Hungarian footballer

Personal information
- Date of birth: 18 November 1996 (age 30)
- Place of birth: Ócsa, Hungary
- Height: 1.78 m (5 ft 10 in)
- Position: Defender

Team information
- Current team: Kazincbarcika
- Number: 34

Youth career
- 2003–2014: Ferencváros

Senior career*
Years	Team	Apps	(Gls)
2014–2017	Ferencváros	1	(0)
2016	→ Soroksár (loan)	25	(2)
2017–2019	Puskás Akadémia	14	(0)
2018	→ Nyíregyháza (loan)	6	(0)
2018–2019	→ Csákvár (loan)	27	(1)
2019–2022	Nyíregyháza	24	(0)
2022–2023	Szentlőrinc	6	(0)
2023–	Kazincbarcika	3	(0)

International career^{‡}
2014	Hungary U-18	1	(0)
- * Club domestic league appearances and goals as of 21 December 2023 ‡ National team caps and goals as of 19 March 2014

Ádám Csilus (born 18 November 1996) is a Hungarian football player who plays for Kazincbarcika.

He is the younger brother of Tamás Csilus, who is also a footballer.

== Club career ==
Csilus signed with Szentlőrinc in July 2022 and left the club in January 2023.
