= Tamás Csilus =

Hungarian footballer

Personal information
- Date of birth: 8 May 1995 (age 31)
- Place of birth: Ócsa, Hungary
- Height: 1.78 m (5 ft 10 in)
- Position: Midfielder

Team information
- Current team: Budapest Honvéd
- Number: 13

Youth career
- 2002–2013: Ferencváros

Senior career*
Years	Team	Apps	(Gls)
2013–2014	Ferencváros II	32	(2)
2013–2017	Ferencváros	1	(0)
2014–2015	→ Pápa (loan)	21	(0)
2015–2016	→ Kisvárda (loan)	21	(0)
2016–2017	→ Soroksár (loan)	34	(3)
2017–2018	Nyíregyháza	27	(4)
2018–2020	Siófok	43	(1)
2020–2023	Haladás	93	(7)
2023–2024	Kazincbarcika	23	(0)
2024–	Budapest Honvéd	13	(0)
- * Club domestic league appearances and goals as of 10 June 2025

Tamás Csilus (born 8 May 1995) is a Hungarian football player. He plays for Budapest Honvéd in the Hungarian NB II. He played his first league match in 2013.

He is the older brother of Ádám Csilus, who is also a footballer.

== Career statistics ==
Appearances and goals by club, season and competition
Club	Season	League			Cup		League Cup		Europe		Total	
Club	Season	Division	Apps	Goals	Apps	Goals	Apps	Goals	Apps	Goals	Apps	Goals
Ferencváros II
Ferencváros II	2012–13	Nemzeti Bajnokság II	11	0	0	0	0	0	0	0	11	0
Ferencváros II	2013–14	Nemzeti Bajnokság III	21	2	0	0	0	0	0	0	21	2
Ferencváros II	Total		32	2	0	0	0	0	0	0	32	2
Ferencváros
Ferencváros	2012–13	Nemzeti Bajnokság I	1	0	0	0	2	0	0	0	3	0
Ferencváros	2013–14	Nemzeti Bajnokság I	0	0	0	0	1	0	0	0	1	0
Ferencváros	Total		1	0	0	0	3	0	0	0	4	0
Pápa	2014–15	Nemzeti Bajnokság I	21	0	1	0	4	0	0	0	26	0
Kisvárda	2015–16	Nemzeti Bajnokság II	21	0	1	2	0	0	0	0	22	2
Soroksár	2016–17	Nemzeti Bajnokság II	34	3	0	0	0	0	0	0	34	3
Career total			109	5	2	2	7	0	0	0	118	7

Updated to games played as of 6 July 2017.

== Honours ==
Ferencváros

- Hungarian League Cup (1): 2012–13
