= László Hodgyai =

Romanian footballer (born 1992)

Personal information
- Full name: László Hodgyai
- Date of birth: 18 January 1992 (age 34)
- Place of birth: Miercurea Ciuc, Romania
- Position: Forward

Youth career
- –2011: ASA Târgu Mureș

Senior career*
Years	Team	Apps	(Gls)
2011–2012	ASA II Târgu Mureș		
2012–2016	Ferencvárosi II	28	(3)
2013–2015	→ Soroksár	29	(4)
2016–2017	CFR Cluj	2	(0)
2017	Csákvár	12	(1)
2017–2020	FK Csíkszereda	12	(2)
2020–2021	Jászberény	18	(7)
2021	Odorheiu Secuiesc	7	(4)
2021	FK Csíkszereda	1	(0)
- * Club domestic league appearances and goals as of 9 August 2021

László Attila Hodgyai (born 18 January 1992) is a Romanian professional footballer who plays as a forward.

== Honours ==
FK Csíkszereda

- Liga III: 2018–19
