= Attila Busai =

Hungarian footballer

Personal information
- Full name: Attila Busai
- Date of birth: 21 January 1989 (age 37)
- Place of birth: Budapest, Hungary
- Height: 1.68 m (5 ft 6 in)
- Position: Midfielder

Team information
- Current team: BKV Előre
- Number: 11

Youth career
- 1999–2001: Gödöllő
- 2005–2007: MTK

Senior career*
Years	Team	Apps	(Gls)
2006–2010	MTK	1	(0)
2010–2012	Wil	44	(1)
2012–2017	Ferencváros	73	(12)
2013	→ Szolnok (loan)	13	(12)
2017–2018	Diósgyőr	43	(3)
2019	Nyíregyháza	6	(0)
2020	NEROCA	3	(0)
2020	Nyköping	0	(0)
2021–	BKV Előre	43	(23)

International career
2006–2007	Hungary U-17	?	(?)
2007–2008	Hungary U-19	9	(2)
2008–2009	Hungary U-20	3	(0)
- * Club domestic league appearances and goals as of 23 April 2023

Attila Busai (born 21 January 1989) is a Hungarian football player who plays for BKV Előre SC.

== Career statistics ==
Appearances and goals by club, season and competition
Club	Season	League			Cup		League Cup		Europe		Total	
Club	Season	Division	Apps	Goals	Apps	Goals	Apps	Goals	Apps	Goals	Apps	Goals
MTK Budapest
MTK Budapest	2006–07	Nemzeti Bajnokság I	1	0	0	0	0	0	0	0	1	0
MTK Budapest	2007–08	Nemzeti Bajnokság I	0	0	0	0	4	0	0	0	4	0
MTK Budapest	2008–09	Nemzeti Bajnokság I	0	0	0	0	2	0	0	0	2	0
MTK Budapest	2009–10	Nemzeti Bajnokság I	0	0	0	0	4	1	0	0	4	1
MTK Budapest	Total		1	0	0	0	10	1	0	0	11	1
Wil
Wil	2009–10	Swiss Challenge League	11	0	0	0	0	0	0	0	11	0
Wil	2010–11	Swiss Challenge League	22	0	0	0	0	0	0	0	22	0
Wil	2011–12	Swiss Challenge League	9	0	2	1	0	0	0	0	11	1
Wil	Total		42	0	2	1	0	0	0	0	44	1
Ferencváros
Ferencváros	2011–12	Nemzeti Bajnokság I	7	1	0	0	0	0	0	0	7	1
Ferencváros	2012–13	Nemzeti Bajnokság I	1	0	0	0	4	1	0	0	5	1
Ferencváros	2013–14	Nemzeti Bajnokság I	18	3	3	2	10	1	0	0	31	6
Ferencváros	2014–15	Nemzeti Bajnokság I	22	4	4	4	5	7	5	1	36	16
Ferencváros	2015–16	Nemzeti Bajnokság I	19	2	2	5	—		4	1	25	8
Ferencváros	2016–17	Nemzeti Bajnokság I	6	2	3	4	—		0	0	9	6
Ferencváros	Total		73	12	12	15	19	9	9	2	113	38
Szolnok	2012–13	Nemzeti Bajnokság II	19	12	0	0	0	0	0	0	19	12
Diósgyőr
Diósgyőr	2016–17	Nemzeti Bajnokság I	11	1	2	0	—		0	0	13	1
Diósgyőr	2017–18	Nemzeti Bajnokság I	29	2	3	0	—		0	0	32	2
Diósgyőr	2018–19	Nemzeti Bajnokság I	3	0	0	0	—		—		3	0
Diósgyőr	Total		43	3	5	0	0	0	0	0	48	3
Career total			178	27	19	16	29	10	9	2	235	55

Updated to games played as of 28 July 2018.

== Honours ==
Ferencváros

- Nemzeti Bajnokság I: 2015–16, runner-up 2014–15
- Magyar Kupa: 2014–15, 2015–16, 2016–17
- Szuperkupa: 2015, 2016
- Ligakupa: 2014–15
