= Roland Ugrai =

Hungarian footballer

Personal information
- Full name: Roland András Ugrai
- Date of birth: 13 November 1992 (age 34)
- Place of birth: Békéscsaba, Hungary
- Height: 1.74 m (5 ft 8 1/2 in)
- Positions: Right winger; forward

Team information
- Current team: Gyirmót
- Number: 17

Youth career
- 2002–2007: Békéscsaba
- 2007–2008: Haladás

Senior career*
Years	Team	Apps	(Gls)
2009–2014	Haladás	47	(8)
2014–2015	Ferencváros	22	(2)
2015–2016	Haladás	17	(3)
2016–2018	Diósgyőr	51	(15)
2018–2020	Atromitos	20	(5)
2020	Budapest Honvéd	21	(4)
2021–2022	Debrecen	33	(13)
2022–2023	Pendikspor	3	(0)
2023–2024	Mezőkövesd	10	(0)
2024–	Gyirmót	28	(8)

International career^{‡}
2012	Hungary U20	2	(0)
2012–2014	Hungary U21	11	(1)
2017–	Hungary	5	(1)
- * Club domestic league appearances and goals as of 10 June 2025 ‡ National team caps and goals as of 7 May 2019

Roland Ugrai (born 13 November 1992) is a Hungarian football player who plays for Hungarian club Gyirmót.

== Club career ==
=== Atromitos ===
On 13 September 2018, Ugrai signed a two-year contract with Super League club Atromitos. Nine days later he scored his first goal with the Greek side in a 2–0 home win against AEL. On 30 September 2018, he sealed a 2–0 away win against Levadiakos. On 3 November 2018, in a 1–1 home win draw against rivals PAOK, he scored with a superb effort as the 25-year-old striker finding himself some space in the box to pick his spot and beat the dive of PAOK goalkeeper Alexandros Paschalakis.

On 20 June 2023, Ugrai signed a 2+1 year contract with Mezőkövesd.

== Career statistics ==
Appearances and goals by club, season and competition
Club	Season	League			Cup		League Cup		Europe		Total	
Club	Season	Division	Apps	Goals	Apps	Goals	Apps	Goals	Apps	Goals	Apps	Goals
Haladás
Haladás	2008–09	Nemzeti Bajnokság I	0	0	0	0	1	0	0	0	1	0
Haladás	2009–10	Nemzeti Bajnokság I	2	1	0	0	0	0	1	0	3	1
Haladás	2010–11	Nemzeti Bajnokság I	4	0	1	0	3	0	0	0	8	0
Haladás	2011–12	Nemzeti Bajnokság I	9	1	1	0	5	2	0	0	15	3
Haladás	2012–13	Nemzeti Bajnokság I	21	3	2	0	1	0	0	0	24	3
Haladás	2013–14	Nemzeti Bajnokság I	11	3	3	2	0	0	0	0	14	5
Haladás	2015–16	Nemzeti Bajnokság I	17	3	3	2	0	0	0	0	20	5
Haladás	Total		65	11	10	4	10	2	1	0	86	17
Ferencváros
Ferencváros	2013–14	Nemzeti Bajnokság I	8	0	0	0	3	3	0	0	11	3
Ferencváros	2014–15	Nemzeti Bajnokság I	14	2	3	1	10	3	3	2	29	8
Ferencváros	2015–16	Nemzeti Bajnokság I	0	0	0	0	0	0	1	0	1	0
Ferencváros	Total		22	2	3	1	13	6	4	2	42	11
Diósgyőr
Diósgyőr	2016–17	Nemzeti Bajnokság I	18	5	3	3	0	0	0	0	21	8
Diósgyőr	2017–18	Nemzeti Bajnokság I	31	10	5	2	0	0	0	0	36	12
Diósgyőr	2018–19	Nemzeti Bajnokság I	2	0	0	0	—		—		2	0
Diósgyőr	Total		51	15	8	5	0	0	0	0	59	20
Atromitos
Atromitos	2018–19	Super League Greece	11	3	2	0	0	0	0	0	13	3
Atromitos	2019–20	Super League Greece	9	2	1	0	0	0	2	0	12	2
Atromitos	Total		20	5	3	0	0	0	2	0	25	5
Budapest Honvéd
Budapest Honvéd	2019–20	Nemzeti Bajnokság I	13	3	5	0	—		0	0	18	3
Budapest Honvéd	2020–21	Nemzeti Bajnokság I	8	1	1	0	—		2	0	11	1
Budapest Honvéd	Total		21	4	6	0	0	0	2	0	29	4
Debrecen
Debrecen	2020–21	Nemzeti Bajnokság II	8	3	1	0	—		—		9	3
Debrecen	2021–22	Nemzeti Bajnokság I	25	10	2	0	—		—		27	10
Debrecen	Total		33	13	3	0	0	0	0	0	36	13
Career total			212	50	33	10	23	8	9	2	277	70

Updated to games played as of 15 May 2022.

=== International goals ===
Scores and results list Hungary's goal tally first.

No	Date	Venue	Opponent	Score	Result	Competition
1.	7 October 2017	St. Jakob-Park, Basel, Switzerland	Switzerland	2–5	2–5	2018 FIFA World Cup qualification

== Honours ==
Ferencváros

- Hungarian Cup: 2014–15
- Hungarian League Cup: 2014–15
- Szuperkupa: 2015

Honvéd

- Hungarian Cup: 2019-20
