= Roland Kunsági =

Hungarian footballer

Personal information
- Full name: Roland Kunsági
- Date of birth: 17 April 1990 (age 36)
- Place of birth: Budapest, Hungary
- Height: 1.88 m (6 ft 2 in)
- Position: Goalkeeper

Youth career
- 2003–2009: Budapest Honvéd

Senior career*
Years	Team	Apps	(Gls)
2009–2011	Budapest Honvéd FC II	33	(0)
2011–2012	Rákospalotai EAC	9	(0)
2012–2016	Ferencvárosi TC	1	(0)
2014–2015	→ Mezőkövesdi SE (loan)	28	(0)
2016	→ Soroksár SC (loan)	1	(0)
2016–2017	ETO FC Győr	0	(0)

International career
2008–2009	Hungary U-19		
- * Club domestic league appearances and goals as of 1 August 2017

Roland Kunsági (born 17 April 1990 in Budapest) is a Hungarian football player.

== Honours ==
Ferencváros

- Hungarian League Cup (1): 2012–13
