= 2014–15 Ligakupa =

Tournament details
- Country: Hungary
- Teams: 32

Final positions
- Champions: Ferencváros
- Runners-up: Debrecen

The 2014–15 Ligakupa was the 8th and final edition of the Hungarian association football League Cup, the Ligakupa.

== Group stage ==
=== Group A ===
Pos	Team	Pld	W	D	L	GF	GA	GD	Pts	Qualification	NYÍ	DIÓ	CEG	SZO
1	Nyíregyháza	6	4	1	1	8	4	+4	13	Advance to knockout phase	—	0–0	3–0	1–0
2	Diósgyőr	6	3	1	2	12	8	+4	10	Advance to knockout phase	3–0	—	3–1	4–1
3	Cegléd	6	2	0	4	9	12	−3	6		1–2	4–1	—	2–1
4	Szolnok	6	2	0	4	6	11	−5	6		0–2	2–1	2–1	—

Source: Soccerway
Legend: Blue = home team win; Yellow = draw; Red = away team win.

=== Group B ===
Pos	Team	Pld	W	D	L	GF	GA	GD	Pts	Qualification	DEB	BÉK	KEC	SZE
1	Debrecen	6	4	1	1	17	4	+13	13	Advance to knockout phase	—	2–3	2–0	1–1
2	Békéscsaba	6	3	0	3	10	14	−4	9	Advance to knockout phase	0–6	—	2–3	2–0
3	Kecskemét	6	2	1	3	6	9	−3	7		0–2	2–0	—	0–0
4	Szeged	6	1	2	3	5	11	−6	5		0–4	1–3	3–1	—

Source: Soccerway
Legend: Blue = home team win; Yellow = draw; Red = away team win.

=== Group C ===
Pos	Team	Pld	W	D	L	GF	GA	GD	Pts	Qualification	MTK	DUN	MEZ	BAL
1	MTK Budapest	6	5	0	1	16	8	+8	15	Advance to knockout phase	—	2–3	2–1	2–1
2	Dunaújváros	6	4	1	1	18	8	+10	13	Advance to knockout phase	1–2	—	6–1	1–1
3	Mezőkövesd	6	2	0	4	13	20	−7	6		2–5	0–4	—	4–2
4	Balmazújváros	6	0	1	5	7	18	−11	1		0–3	2–3	1–5	—

Source: Soccerway
Legend: Blue = home team win; Yellow = draw; Red = away team win.

=== Group D ===
Pos	Team	Pld	W	D	L	GF	GA	GD	Pts	Qualification	HON	GYŐ	GYI	CSÁ
1	Budapest Honvéd	6	4	1	1	19	12	+7	13	Advance to knockout phase	—	1–0	4–0	7–3
2	Győr	6	3	1	2	17	12	+5	10	Advance to knockout phase	3–3	—	1–3	4–1
3	Gyirmót	6	2	1	3	10	12	−2	7		1–2	1–4	—	4–0
4	Csákvár	6	1	1	4	13	23	−10	4		5–2	3–5	1–1	—

Source: Soccerway
Legend: Blue = home team win; Yellow = draw; Red = away team win.

=== Group E ===
Pos	Team	Pld	W	D	L	GF	GA	GD	Pts	Qualification	VID	ÚJP	VAS	AJK
1	Videoton	6	4	1	1	18	5	+13	13	Advance to knockout phase	—	3–1	5–1	4–0
2	Újpest	6	4	1	1	14	8	+6	13	Advance to knockout phase	1–0	—	2–1	4–1
3	Vasas	6	2	1	3	10	13	−3	7		1–1	1–4	—	2–1
4	Ajka	6	0	1	5	5	21	−16	1		1–5	2–2	0–4	—

Source: Soccerway
Legend: Blue = home team win; Yellow = draw; Red = away team win.

=== Group F ===
Pos	Team	Pld	W	D	L	GF	GA	GD	Pts	Qualification	FER	PAK	KAP	ZAL
1	Ferencváros	6	3	2	1	9	4	+5	11	Advance to knockout phase	—	2–1	3–0	2–0
2	Paks	6	2	3	1	13	10	+3	9	Advance to knockout phase	1–1	—	4–3	2–2
3	Kaposvár	6	2	0	4	6	12	−6	6		1–0	1–4	—	1–0
4	Zalaegerszeg	6	1	3	2	5	7	−2	6		1–1	1–1	1–0	—

Source: Soccerway
Legend: Blue = home team win; Yellow = draw; Red = away team win.

=== Group G ===
Pos	Team	Pld	W	D	L	GF	GA	GD	Pts	Qualification	HAL	SOP	PÁP	SIÓ
1	Haladás	6	4	1	1	12	4	+8	13	Advance to knockout phase	—	1–1	2–1	2–0
2	Sopron	6	3	1	2	7	5	+2	10	Advance to knockout phase	2–1	—	2–0	0–2
3	Pápa	6	2	1	3	5	7	−2	7		0–2	1–0	—	2–0
4	Siófok	6	1	1	4	3	11	−8	4		0–4	0–2	1–1	—

Source: Soccerway
Legend: Blue = home team win; Yellow = draw; Red = away team win.

=== Group H ===
Pos	Team	Pld	W	D	L	GF	GA	GD	Pts	Qualification	SZI	PÉC	SOR	PUS
1	Szigetszentmiklós	6	3	2	1	10	3	+7	11	Advance to knockout phase	—	0–1	4–0	2–0
2	Pécs	6	3	2	1	8	5	+3	11	Advance to knockout phase	1–1	—	2–1	0–0
3	Soroksár	6	2	1	3	8	12	−4	7		1–1	0–2	—	3–2
4	Puskás Akadémia	6	1	1	4	6	12	−6	4		0–2	3–2	1–3	—

Source: Soccerway
Legend: Blue = home team win; Yellow = draw; Red = away team win.

== Knockout phase ==
Round of 16
Sopron	1	1	2
Debrecen	1	3	4
Dunaújváros	2	1	3
Videoton	1	3	4
Pécs	0	2	2
Haladás	0	1	1
Paks	0	1	1
MTK Budapest	3	2	5
Ferencváros	4	0	4
Újpest	1	0	1
Győr	1	0	1
Szigetszentmiklós	2	0	2
Diósgyőr	2	1	3
Budapest Honvéd (a)	3	0	3
Békéscsaba	2	0	2
Nyíregyháza	2	1	3

Quarter-finals
Debrecen	2	2	4
Videoton	3	0	3
Pécs	0	0	0
MTK Budapest	1	1	2
Ferencváros	7	3	10
Szigetszentmiklós	1	2	3
Budapest Honvéd	3	3	6
Nyíregyháza	0	2	2

Semi-finals
Debrecen	3	2	5
MTK Budapest	1	0	1
Ferencváros	3	0	3
Budapest Honvéd	0	1	1

Final
Debrecen	1
Ferencváros	2

=== Round of 16 ===
Team 1	Agg.	Team 2	1st leg	2nd leg
Paks	1–5	MTK Budapest	0–3	1–2
Győr	1–2	Szigetszentmiklósi	1–2	0–0
Békéscsaba	2–3	Nyíregyháza	2–2	0–1
Dunaújváros PASE	3–4	Videoton	2–1	1–3
Pécsi	2–1	Haladás	0–0	2–1
Újpest	1–4	Ferencváros	1–4	0–0
Soproni VSE	2–4	Debrecen	1–1	1–3
DVTK	3–3	Budapest Honvéd	2–3	1–0

=== Quarter-finals ===
Team 1	Agg.	Team 2	1st leg	2nd leg
Debrecen	4–3	Videoton	2–3	2–0
Pécsi	0–2	MTK Budapest	0–1	0–1
Szigetszentmiklósi	3–10	Ferencváros	1–7	2–3
Budapest Honvéd	6–2	Nyíregyháza	3–0	3–2

=== Semi-finals ===
Team 1	Agg.	Team 2	1st leg	2nd leg
Debrecen	5–1	MTK Budapest	3–1	2–0
Ferencváros	4–0	Budapest Honvéd	3–0	1–0

=== Final ===
3 June 2015
19:00 (UTC+2)

Debreceni VSC (I)	1–2	Ferencvárosi TC (I)
Brković 73'		Ugrai 8'; Da. Nagy 47'

Nagyerdei Stadion, Debrecen
Attendance: 5,500
Referee: Mihály Fábián
