= Muhamed Bešić =

Bosnian footballer (born 1992)

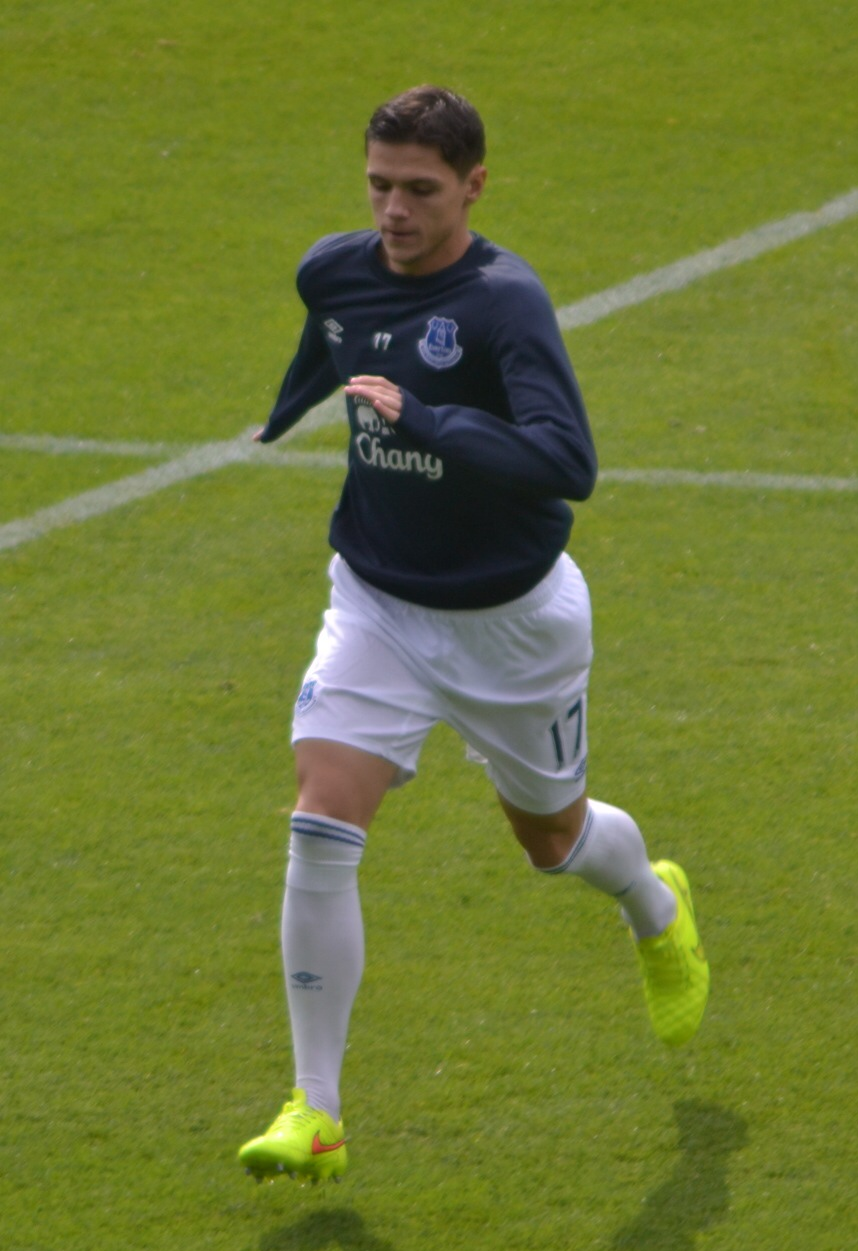
- Bešić with Everton in 2014

Personal information
- Date of birth: 10 September 1992 (age 34)
- Place of birth: Berlin, Germany
- Height: 1.80 m (5 ft 11 in)
- Position: Defensive midfielder

Team information
- Current team: OFK Beograd
- Number: 17

Youth career
- SpVgg Tiergarten
- Reinickendorfer Füchse
- 2007–2009: TB Berlin
- 2009–2010: Hamburger SV

Senior career*
Years	Team	Apps	(Gls)
2010–2012	Hamburger SV II	38	(0)
2010–2012	Hamburger SV	3	(0)
2012–2014	Ferencváros	47	(1)
2014–2021	Everton	37	(0)
2018–2019	→ Middlesbrough (loan)	52	(3)
2019–2020	→ Sheffield United (loan)	9	(0)
2021–2024	Ferencváros	44	(1)
2025–2026	Spartak Subotica	26	(0)
2026–	OFK Beograd	0	(0)

International career
2010–2012	Bosnia and Herzegovina U21	10	(2)
2010–2022	Bosnia and Herzegovina	47	(0)
- * Club domestic league appearances and goals as of 19 April 2026

Muhamed Bešić (pronounced [muxǎmed běʃitɕ]; born 10 September 1992) is a professional footballer who plays as a defensive midfielder for Serbian SuperLiga club OFK Beograd. Born in Germany, he played for the Bosnia and Herzegovina national team.

Bešić started his professional career at Hamburger SV, playing mainly in its reserve team, before joining Ferencváros in 2012. Two years later, he moved to Everton, who loaned him to Middlesbrough in 2018 and to Sheffield United in 2019. He went back to Ferencváros in 2021. In 2025, Bešić signed with Spartak Subotica. The following year, he joined OFK Beograd.

A former youth international for Bosnia and Herzegovina, Bešić made his senior international debut in 2010, earning over 40 caps until 2022. He represented the nation at their first ever major championship, the 2014 FIFA World Cup.

== Club career ==
=== Hamburger SV ===
Bešić started playing football at local clubs, before joining Hamburger SV's youth academy in 2009. In November 2010, he signed his first professional contract with the team. He made his professional debut against Borussia Dortmund on 12 November at the age of 18.

=== Ferencváros ===
In August 2012, he moved to Hungarian side Ferencváros on a one-year deal. He made his official debut for the club on 14 September against Haladás. On 5 May 2013, he scored his first professional goal in a triumph over Paks.

In July, he prolonged his contract with the squad until June 2016.

=== Everton ===
In July 2014, Bešić was transferred to English outfit Everton for an undisclosed fee. He made his competitive debut for the team on 30 August against Chelsea.

In February 2016, he signed a new five-year deal with the side.

In August, he suffered a severe knee injury, which was diagnosed as an anterior cruciate ligament tear and was ruled out for at least six months. Over eight months after the injury, on 10 April 2017, he returned to the pitch.

In February 2018, he was loaned to Middlesbrough for the remainder of the campaign. In August, his loan was extended for an additional season.

In August 2019, he was sent on a season-long loan to Sheffield United.

=== Return to Ferencváros ===
In September 2021, Bešić returned to Ferencváros on a three-year contract. On 22 September, he played his first official game for the squad since coming back against Fehérvár. He won his first trophy with the club after returning on 24 April 2022, when they were crowned league champions. On 29 April, he scored first goal for Ferencváros since his comeback in a defeat of Paks.

Bešić appeared in his 100th match for the team against Honvéd on 13 November.

In February 2023, he suffered a ruptured anterior cruciate ligament again and was expected to be sidelined for at least half a year. Over seven months after the injury, on 16 September, he made his return to action and managed to score a goal.

=== Later stage of career ===
In January 2025, Bešić joined Serbian side Spartak Subotica.

In August 2026, he switched to OFK Beograd.

== International career ==
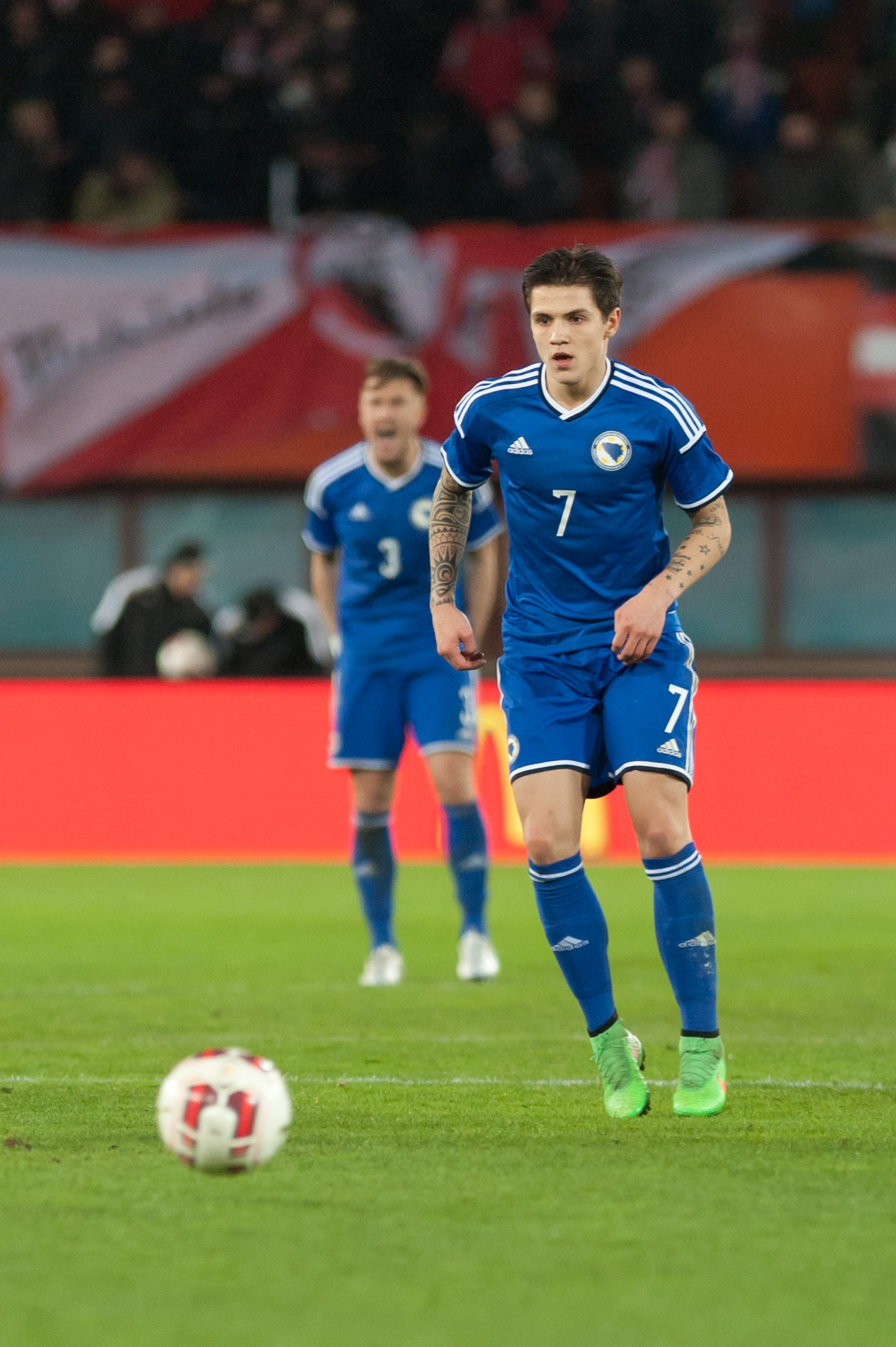
Bešić playing for Bosnia and Herzegovina in 2015

Bešić was a member of the Bosnia and Herzegovina under-21 team for several years.

In November 2010, he received his first senior call up, for a friendly game against Slovakia, and debuted in that match on 17 November.

In June 2014, Bešić was named in Bosnia and Herzegovina's squad for the 2014 FIFA World Cup, country's first ever major competition. He made his tournament debut in the opening group tie against Argentina on 15 June.

== Style of play ==
During his career, Bešić has been deployed as a right-back and as a centre-back, although his natural position in his own words is defensive midfielder.

He was described by then Everton manager Roberto Martínez as a "very complete footballer", who "has got a natural balance about knowing that he can be strong and aggressive in duels, but also a technical player on the ball."

== Personal life ==
Bešić has three children with his long-time girlfriend Jessica, two daughters and one son.

He is a practising Muslim; together with international teammates Ibrahim Šehić, Armin Hodžić, Izet Hajrović, Sead Kolašinac, Edin Višća and Ervin Zukanović he visited a mosque in Zenica during the national team's concentration.

Bešić has many tattoos, his first being the word Bosanac (Bosnian). Some of many are also names of his parents and brother.

== Career statistics ==
=== Club ===
As of match played 19 April 2026

Appearances and goals by club, season and competition
Club	Season	League			National cup (Note: Includes Magyar Kupa, FA Cup)		League cup (Note: Includes Ligakupa, EFL Cup)		Continental		Other		Total	
Club	Season	Division	Apps	Goals	Apps	Goals	Apps	Goals	Apps	Goals	Apps	Goals	Apps	Goals
Hamburger SV II	2010–11	Regionalliga Nord	23	0	–		–		–		–		23	0
Hamburger SV II	2011–12	Regionalliga Nord	15	0	–		–		–		–		15	0
Hamburger SV II	Total		38	0	–		–		–		–		38	0
Hamburger SV	2010–11	Bundesliga	3	0	0	0	–		–		–		3	0
Ferencváros	2012–13	Nemzeti Bajnokság I	22	1	1	0	4	0	–		–		27	1
Ferencváros	2013–14	Nemzeti Bajnokság I	25	0	2	0	6	0	–		–		33	0
Ferencváros	Total		47	1	3	0	10	0	–		–		60	1
Everton	2014–15	Premier League	23	0	2	0	1	0	5 (Note: Appearances in UEFA Europa League)	0	–		31	0
Everton	2015–16	Premier League	12	0	3	0	2	0	–		–		17	0
Everton	2016–17	Premier League	0	0	0	0	0	0	–		–		0	0
Everton	2017–18	Premier League	2	0	0	0	1	0	5	0	–		8	0
Everton	Total		37	0	5	0	4	0	10	0	–		56	0
Middlesbrough (loan)	2017–18	Championship	15	1	–		–		–		2 (Note: Appearances in Championship play-offs)	0	17	1
Middlesbrough (loan)	2018–19	Championship	37	2	0	0	2	0	–		–		39	2
Middlesbrough (loan)	Total		52	3	0	0	2	0	–		2	0	56	3
Sheffield United (loan)	2019–20	Premier League	9	0	2	1	2	0	–		–		13	1
Ferencváros	2021–22	Nemzeti Bajnokság I	20	1	2	0	–		0	0	–		22	1
Ferencváros	2022–23	Nemzeti Bajnokság I	16	0	1	0	–		7 (Note: One appearance in UEFA Champions League; six appearances in UEFA Europa League)	0	–		24	0
Ferencváros	2023–24	Nemzeti Bajnokság I	8	0	2	1	–		4 (Note: Appearances in UEFA Conference League)	0	–		14	1
Ferencváros	Total		44	1	5	1	–		11	0	–		60	2
Spartak Subotica	2024–25	Serbian SuperLiga	5	0	0	0	–		–		–		5	0
Spartak Subotica	2025–26	Serbian SuperLiga	21	0	0	0	–		–		–		21	0
Spartak Subotica	Total		26	0	0	0	–		–		–		26	0
OFK Beograd	2026–27	Serbian SuperLiga	0	0	0	0	–		–		–		0	0
Career total			256	5	15	2	18	0	21	0	2	0	312	7

=== International ===
Appearances and goals by national team and year
National team	Year	Apps	Goals
Bosnia and Herzegovina
Bosnia and Herzegovina	2010	1	0
Bosnia and Herzegovina	2011	4	0
Bosnia and Herzegovina	2012	2	0
Bosnia and Herzegovina	2013	0	0
Bosnia and Herzegovina	2014	10	0
Bosnia and Herzegovina	2015	6	0
Bosnia and Herzegovina	2016	3	0
Bosnia and Herzegovina	2017	2	0
Bosnia and Herzegovina	2018	8	0
Bosnia and Herzegovina	2019	7	0
Bosnia and Herzegovina	2020	2	0
Bosnia and Herzegovina	2021	0	0
Bosnia and Herzegovina	2022	2	0
Total		47	0

== Honours ==
Ferencváros

- Nemzeti Bajnokság I: 2021–22, 2022–23, 2023–24
- Magyar Kupa: 2021–22
- Ligakupa: 2012–13
