= 2014–15 Everton F.C. season =

English football club season

Everton
2014–15 season
- Chairman: Bill Kenwright
- Manager: Roberto Martínez
- Stadium: Goodison Park
- Premier League: 11th
- FA Cup: Third Round
- League Cup: Third Round
- UEFA Europa League: Round of 16
- Top goalscorer: League: Romelu Lukaku (10); All: Romelu Lukaku (20)
- Highest home attendance: 39,505 (vs. Aston Villa, 18 October 2014)
- Lowest home attendance: 22,236 (vs. West Ham United, 6 January 2015)
Home colours	Away colours	Third colours

The 2014–15 season was Everton's 23rd season in the Premier League and 61st consecutive season in the top division of English football. It is also Everton's 116th season of league football and 118th season in all competitions. The club finished fifth in the previous campaign to qualify for the Europa League, which saw Everton play in Europe for the first time since the 2009–10 season. On 30 July 2014, the club signed Chelsea striker Romelu Lukaku for a club record £28 million.

== Season overview ==
=== July ===
"This signing is not just important for this season. It is a significant day in the history of this football club. We know that Romelu is still a young man and the potential that he has is quite unique, and we are desperate to see him enjoying his football and to watch him grow as footballer in the years to come."

— Roberto Martínez, Everton's manager, on signing Romelu Lukaku, 30 July 2014.

On 8 July, Everton signed Gareth Barry on a three-year contract after the midfielder had been on loan to the club in the previous campaign. Later in the month Bosnian Muhamed Bešić joined from Ferencváros for an undisclosed fee. On 30 July, Everton broke their record transfer fee by signing Romelu Lukaku from Chelsea for £28 million, smashing the £15 million the club paid for Marouane Fellaini in 2008. Lukaku had been on loan at Everton last season, scoring 16 goals in 33 games.

=== August ===
Everton played five pre-season friendlies before their first Premier League match without winning any (drew two, lost three). They opened the year with a 2–2 draw at newcomers Leicester City after twice being ahead. A week later goals from Séamus Coleman and Steven Naismith saw Everton take a 2–0 lead over Arsenal with seven minutes to go, but two late goals resulted in a second consecutive 2–2 draw. On 26 August, Everton signed Cameroon striker Samuel Eto'o on a free transfer. Everton were then involved in the joint seventh highest scoring game in the history of the Premier League when they fell 2–0 down at home to Chelsea after three minutes and went on to be defeated 6–3. It meant the club had equalled a Premier League record by conceding 10 goals in the first three games.

=== September ===
Everton recorded their first win of the campaign by beating West Bromwich Albion 2–0 at the Hawthorns with Lukaku getting his first goal since joining permanently. The club then returned to European football for the first time since February 2010 with an impressive 4–1 victory over VfL Wolfsburg. Everton's congested fixture list then seemed to affect results as Crystal Palace beat them 3–2 at Goodison Park for the second successive season and the Toffees were unceremoniously knocked out of the League Cup 3–0 by Swansea City. However, the month did end on a positive note when Phil Jagielka scored a spectacular injury-time drive from 30 yards to salvage a 1–1 in the first Merseyside derby at Anfield.

=== October ===
The side battled to a 1–1 draw once more this time in Russia against Krasnodar with Samuel Eto'o getting the goal. The fixture became Everton's furthest ever competitive game, some 2,400 miles from Goodison Park. A 2–1 loss at Old Trafford followed with Leighton Baines missing his first Premier League penalty after converting all of his 15 previous ones. During the match defender John Stones picked up an ankle injury which ruled him out of the rest of 2014, but in the next game Everton welcomed back Ross Barkley for his first appearance of the season and beat Aston Villa 3–0 at home. Everton won successive games for the first time this season by defeating Burnley 3–1 with Eto'o scoring a brace and on 31 October announced club record profits of £28.2 million for the year ending 31 May 2014.

=== November ===
A 0–0 draw with Swansea City marked the first time Everton had not scored a goal in a league match this season. They remained top of Group H in the Europa League with a resounding 3–0 win over Lille. Everton recorded just their second home win of the season by beating West Ham United 2–1 and then guaranteed they would finish atop of their Europa League group with a game to spare when they won 2–0 against Wolfsburg, described as a perfect away performance by Martínez. However, the month closed with a first defeat in eight games in all competitions when they lost 2–1 to Tottenham Hotspur.

=== December ===
Martínez then blamed Everton's busy schedule of matches for their 1–1 home draw against relegation candidates Hull City and a contentious penalty for Manchester City proved the difference in a 1–0 loss at the City of Manchester Stadium. Ross Barkley scored a superb individual goal to put Everton 1–0 ahead of Queens Park Rangers, with further goals from Kevin Mirallas and Steven Naismith helping the Toffees to their fifth league win of the campaign. Everton's up and down season continued when they were beaten 3–0 by Southampton to maintain their mid-table position in the league. However, their form was to get worse over the Christmas period with a 1–0 home defeat to Stoke City and a 3–2 loss against Newcastle United. Everton ended the calendar year with the second worse defensive record in the league and had made the most individual errors resulting in goals in Europe's top five leagues. Despite this, Martínez stated that he would not change his team's style of play which had proven so successful last season.

=== January ===
Everton lost their fourth game in a row on New Year's Day when Hull City saw them off 2–0. Lukaku scored a stoppage time goal to rescue a 1–1 draw against West Ham United in the third round of the FA Cup. Their run without picking up any points ended when Steven Naismith equalised to draw 1–1 at home to reigning champions Manchester City. Leighton Baines delivered the ball for the goal which was his 45th assist in the Premier League to overtake Graeme Le Saux as the defender with the most in the history of the division. Aiden McGeady was sent off in the 56th minute of Everton's FA Cup replay with West Ham, but Kevin Mirallas scored a free kick to send the match into extra time during which Everton took the lead through Lukaku. However, West Ham levelled meaning penalties were required to settle the tie which they won 9–8 after goalkeeper Joel Robles missed for Everton and his opposite number Adrián converted the game-winning penalty. The barren spell continued with a 0–0 draw at home to West Bromwich Albion after Kevin Mirallas refused to hand over the ball to regular penalty taker Leighton Baines and subsequently missed. Samuel Eto'o's brief stay at the club ended when he joined Sampdoria.

=== February ===
Everton won for the first time in nine matches as Lukaku scored the only goal of the game after two minutes in beating Crystal Palace. The club signed Aaron Lennon from Tottenham Hotspur on loan for the rest of the season on transfer deadline day. A 0–0 draw with Liverpool followed before an 89th minute Chelsea goal proved the difference between the teams. However, Everton's good form in Europe continued as Lukaku scored a hat-trick during a 4–1 away win over Swiss side Young Boys, despite playing for over half an hour with 10 men after John Stones had been dismissed. Bottom of the table club Leicester City twice came from behind to draw 2–2 in the next league fixture, but Everton closed out the month by comfortably progressing to the last 16 of the Europa League by seeing off Young Boys 7–2 on aggregate.

=== March ===
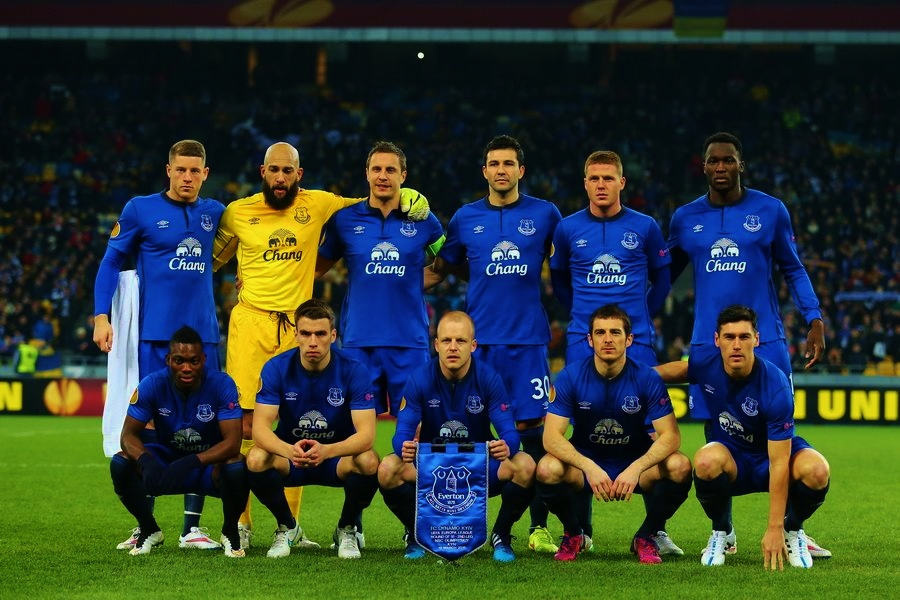
Everton's starting line-up for the away match against Dynamo Kyiv.

Everton's struggles in the league continued as they lost back-to-back matches 2–0 against Arsenal and Stoke City which led Martínez to admit for the first time that his side were in a relegation battle. With 28 points from 28 games, it was Everton's lowest tally at this stage of a season in the history of the Premier League. They responded by coming from a goal down to take a 2–1 first leg lead over Dynamo Kyiv. Lukaku became the club's record European goal scorer as he netted for the seventh time in the competition this season. Everton then won their first league game at home in over three months as James McCarthy opened the scoring with his first goal of the year against Newcastle United and further strikes from Lukaku and Ross Barkley completed a 3–0 victory. The Toffees' run in Europe ended on a 6–4 aggregate loss to Dynamo when they lost the second leg 5–2. For the first time since October, Everton won two consecutive league games with a 2–1 success against Queens Park Rangers which put them nine points clear of relegation.

=== April ===
A 1–0 win over Southampton made for Everton's first three-game league win streak of the season. Everton then tied 1–1 with Swansea City after a goal from Aaron Lennon opened the scoring, and a Jonjo Shelvey penalty equalised for Swansea. Everton defeated relegation candidates Burnley 1–0, before producing undoubtedly their best performance of the season in beating Manchester United 3–0. It marked the third season in a row that Everton had won the home fixture versus the Red Devils and extended their unbeaten run to six matches.

=== May ===
Despite Everton's late season revival, May has so far proved something of an anti-climax as the club were beaten 3–2 by Aston Villa and suffered their first home defeat since December, 2–0 against Sunderland. However, a goal from Leon Osman, coupled with Romelu Lukaku's injury time winner against West Ham ended the Toffee's two game losing streak as well as ensuring Everton would defeat the Hammers for a third consecutive season in Upton Park. Having said that, the mediocre season was capped off with a 1–0 defeat at the hands of Tottenham Hotspur with Harry Kane scoring the only goal. The game similarly marked the end of Sylvain Distin's distinguished Everton career.

== Players ==
=== Squad information ===
N	Pos.	Nat.	Name	Age	EU	Since	App	Goals	Ends	Transfer fee	Notes
24	GK	(United States)	Tim Howard	36	Non-EU	2006	346	1	2018	£3,000,000	Fourth in list of most clean sheets for Everton.
1	GK	(Spain)	Joel Robles	25	EU	2013	9	0	2018	£1,600,000	
36	GK	(Czech Republic)	Jindřich Staněk	19	EU	2014	0	0	2016	Youth system	
30	DF	(Paraguay)	Antolín Alcaraz	32	Non-EU	2013	7	0	2015	Free	
3	DF	(England)	Leighton Baines	30	EU	2007	281	28	2018	£5,000,000 rising to £6,000,000.	
27	DF	(England)	Tyias Browning	21	EU	2012	0	0	2017	Youth system	
23	DF	(Republic of Ireland)	Séamus Coleman	26	EU	2009	143	14	2019	£60,000	Last season's Player of the Year.
15	DF	(France)	Sylvain Distin	37	EU	2009	192	5	2015	£5,000,000	First foreign outfield player to make over 400 Premier League appearances.
29	DF	(England)	Luke Garbutt	22	EU	2009	2	0	2015	Youth system	
32	DF	(England)	Brendan Galloway	19	EU	2014	0	0	2019	Undisclosed	
2	DF	(England)	Tony Hibbert	34	EU	2000	318	0	2016	Youth system	
6	DF	(England)	Phil Jagielka	32	EU	2007	243	9	2017	£4,000,000	
8	DF	(Costa Rica)	Bryan Oviedo	25	Non-EU	2012	31	2	2016	£1,200,000 rising to £3,000,000	
38	DF	(England)	Matthew Pennington	20	EU	2013	0	0	2015	Youth system	
26	DF	(England)	John Stones	21	EU	2013 (Winter)	26	0	2019	With add-ons up to £3,000,000	
20	MF	(England)	Ross Barkley	21	EU	2010	56	7	2018	Youth system	
18	MF	(England)	Gareth Barry	34	EU	2014	37	3	2017	£2,000,000	Signed permanent deal after being on loan the previous year.
17	MF	(Bosnia and Herzegovina)	Muhamed Bešić	22	Non-EU	2014	0	0	2019	£4,000,000	
4	MF	(Republic of Ireland)	Darron Gibson	27	EU	2012 (Winter)	43	2	2016	£500,000 rising to £2,000,000	
39	MF	(England)	Conor Grant	20	EU	2013	0	0	2015	Youth system	
31	MF	(Scotland)	Matthew Kennedy	20	EU	2012	0	0	2015	Nominal	
33	MF	(England)	John Lundstram	21	EU	2012	0	0	2015	Youth system	
16	MF	(Republic of Ireland)	James McCarthy	24	EU	2013	39	1	2017	£13,000,000	
7	MF	(Republic of Ireland)	Aiden McGeady	29	EU	2014 (Winter)	18	0	2018	Undisclosed	
11	MF	(Belgium)	Kevin Mirallas	27	EU	2012	70	17	2016	£6,000,000	
21	MF	(England)	Leon Osman	34	EU	2000	387	53	2016	Youth system	16th in list of most appearances for Everton all-time.
22	MF	(South Africa)	Steven Pienaar	33	Non-EU	2007	211	24	2016	£4,500,000	
37	FW	(England)	Hallam Hope	21	EU	2013	0	0	2015	Youth system	
9	FW	(Ivory Coast)	Arouna Koné	31	Non-EU	2013	6	0	2016	£6,000,000	
41	FW	(England)	Chris Long	20	EU	2013	0	0	2015	Youth system	
10	FW	(Belgium)	Romelu Lukaku	22	EU	2014	33	16	2019	£28,000,000	Club record signing. Signed permanent deal after being on loan the previous year.
35	FW	(England)	Conor McAleny	22	EU	2009	2	0	2017	Youth system	
14	FW	(Scotland)	Steven Naismith	28	EU	2012	71	13	2019	Free	
5	FW	(Cameroon)	Samuel Eto'o	34	Non-EU	2014	0	0	2016	Free	

- Last updated: 16 August 2014 – stats are correct as of start of season
- Source: Everton FC Official Site
- Ordered by position.

=== Player awards ===
- Player of the Season – Phil Jagielka
- Players' Player of the Season – Phil Jagielka
- Young Player of the Season – John Stones
- Reserve / U21 Player of the Season – Brendan Galloway
- Academy Player of the Season – Harry Charsley
- Goal of the Season – Phil Jagielka vs. Liverpool

== Pre-season and Friendlies ==
22 July 2014 Friendly	Tranmere Rovers (England)	2–2	(England) Everton	Birkenhead, England
19:45 BST	Stockton 63'; Rowe 87'	Report	Naismith 26'; Osman 71'	Stadium: Prenton Park

27 July 2014 Friendly	Leicester City (England)	1–0	(England) Everton	Bangkok, Thailand
12:00 BST / 18:00 Local	Taylor-Fletcher 54'	Report		Stadium: Supachalasai Stadium

3 August 2014 Leon Osman Testimonial	Everton (England)	1–1	(Portugal) Porto	Liverpool, England
16:00 BST	Naismith 42'	Report	Martínez 57'	Stadium: Goodison Park

6 August 2014 Friendly	Everton (England)	1–3	(Spain) Celta Vigo	Birkenhead, England
19:45 BST	McGeady 11'	Report	Nolito 19', 24', 34'	Stadium: Prenton Park

9 August 2014 Friendly	Paderborn 07 (Germany)	3–1	(England) Everton	Paderborn, Germany
16:00 CET	Stoppelkamp 15'; Ducksch 68'; Brückner 75'	Report	Long 12'	Stadium: Benteler Arena

Last updated: 9 August 2014
Source: Everton F.C.

== Competitions ==
=== Overall ===
Competition	Started round	Current position / round	Final position / round	First match	Last match
Premier League	—	—	11th	16 August 2014	24 May 2015
FA Cup	Third round	—	Third round	6 January 2015	13 January 2015
League Cup	Third round	—	Third round	23 September 2014	23 September 2014
UEFA Europa League	Group stage	—	Round of 16	18 September 2014	19 March 2015

Updated to match played 21 November 2017
Source: Competitions

=== Overview ===
Competition	Record							
Competition	G	W	D	L	GF	GA	GD	Win %
Premier League	38	12	11	15	48	50	−2	31.58
FA Cup	2	0	2	0	3	3	+0	0.00
League Cup	1	0	0	1	0	3	−3	0.00
Europa League	10	6	2	2	21	10	+11	60.00
Total	51	18	15	18	72	66	+6	35.29

=== Premier League ===
==== League table ====
Pos	Team	Pld	W	D	L	GF	GA	GD	Pts	Qualification or relegation
9	Stoke City	38	15	9	14	48	45	+3	54	
10	Crystal Palace	38	13	9	16	47	51	−4	48	
11	Everton	38	12	11	15	48	50	−2	47	
12	West Ham United	38	12	11	15	44	47	−3	47	Qualification for the Europa League first qualifying round (Note: England was given an extra qualification berth for the Europa League first qualifying round as one of the top three associations in UEFA Respect Fair Play ranking. The spot was given to West Ham United after finishing on top of the Premier League Fair Play table.)
13	West Bromwich Albion	38	11	11	16	38	51	−13	44	

Source: Barclays Premier League
Rules for classification: 1) Points; 2) Goal difference; 3) Goals scored; 4) Play-offs (only if needed to decide champion, teams for relegation or teams for UEFA competitions).

==== Results summary ====
Overall								Home						Away					
Pld	W	D	L	GF	GA	GD	Pts	W	D	L	GF	GA	GD	W	D	L	GF	GA	GD
38	12	11	15	48	50	−2	47	7	7	5	27	21	+6	5	4	10	21	29	−8

Last updated: 24 May 2015.
Source: Premier League

==== Results by matchday ====
Matchday	1	2	3	4	5	6	7	8	9	10	11	12	13	14	15	16	17	18	19	20	21	22	23	24	25	26	27	28	29	30	31	32	33	34	35	36	37	38
Ground	A	H	H	A	H	A	A	H	A	H	A	H	A	H	A	H	A	H	A	A	H	H	A	H	A	H	A	A	H	A	H	A	H	H	A	H	A	H
Result	D	D	L	W	L	D	L	W	W	D	D	W	L	D	L	W	L	L	L	L	D	D	W	D	L	D	L	L	W	W	W	D	W	W	L	L	W	L
Position	6	10	16	9	14	13	17	12	9	9	10	9	10	11	11	10	10	12	12	13	12	12	12	12	12	12	14	14	14	13	11	12	12	10	11	11	10	11

Updated to match(es) played on 24 May 2015. Source: Statto.com
A = Away; H = Home; W = Win; D = Draw; L = Loss

==== Matches ====
Win Draw Loss Postponed

The fixtures for the 2014–15 season were announced on 18 June 2014 at 9am.

16 August 2014 1	Leicester City	2–2	Everton	Leicester
15:00 BST	Ulloa 22'; Wood 86'; Moore (yellow card) 71'	Report	McGeady 20'; Naismith 45'; Barry (yellow card) 68'	Stadium: King Power Stadium; Attendance: 31,603; Referee: Mike Jones

23 August 2014 2	Everton	2–2	Arsenal	Walton, Liverpool
17:30 BST	Coleman 19'; Naismith 45'; Baines (yellow card) 29'	Report	Ramsey 83'; Giroud 90'; Mertesacker (yellow card) 43'; Wilshere (yellow card) 54'; Chambers (yellow card) 57'; Flamini (yellow card) 77'	Stadium: Goodison Park; Attendance: 39,490; Referee: Kevin Friend

30 August 2014 3	Everton	3–6	Chelsea	Walton, Liverpool
17:30 BST	Mirallas 45'; Howard (yellow card) 69'; Naismith 69'; Eto'o 76'	Report	Costa 1', 90' (yellow card) 56'; Ivanović 3'; Ramires (yellow card) 64' (goal) 77'; Coleman 67' (o.g.); Matić 74'; Fàbregas (yellow card) 81'	Stadium: Goodison Park; Attendance: 39,402; Referee: Jonathan Moss

13 September 2014 4	West Bromwich Albion	0–2	Everton	West Bromwich
15:00 BST	Gardner (yellow card) 26'; Wisdom (yellow card) 90'	Report	Lukaku 2'; McCarthy (yellow card) 66'; Mirallas 66'; Naismith (yellow card) 81'; Bešić (yellow card) 90+1'	Stadium: The Hawthorns; Attendance: 23,567; Referee: Anthony Taylor

21 September 2014 5	Everton	2–3	Crystal Palace	Walton, Liverpool
16:00 BST	Lukaku 9'; Eto'o (yellow card) 56'; Naismith (yellow card) 77'; Baines 83' (pen.)	Report	Jedinak 30' (pen.); Campbell 54'; Bolasie 69'; Puncheon (yellow card) 76'; Speroni (yellow card) 89'	Stadium: Goodison Park; Attendance: 37,574; Referee: Michael Oliver

27 September 2014 6	Liverpool	1–1	Everton	Anfield, Liverpool
12:45 BST	Gerrard 65' (yellow card) 67'; Moreno (yellow card) 90+3'	Report	Barry (yellow card) 2'; Jagielka 90+2'	Stadium: Anfield; Attendance: 44,511; Referee: Martin Atkinson

5 October 2014 7	Manchester United	2–1	Everton	Manchester
12:00 BST	van Persie (yellow card) 9'; Di María 27'; Blind (yellow card) 31'; Valencia (yellow card) 55'; Falcao 62'; Wilson (yellow card) 90+3'	Report	Bešić (yellow card) 17'; Pienaar (yellow card) 26'; Naismith 55'; Howard (yellow card) 90+1'	Stadium: Old Trafford; Attendance: 75,294; Referee: Kevin Friend

18 October 2014 8	Everton	3–0	Aston Villa	Walton, Liverpool
15:00 BST	Jagielka 18'; Lukaku 48'; Barry (yellow card) 61'; Naismith (yellow card) 71'; Coleman 76'	Report	Richardson (yellow card) 7'; Agbonlahor (yellow card) 36'	Stadium: Goodison Park; Attendance: 39,505; Referee: Anthony Taylor

26 October 2014 9	Burnley	1–3	Everton	Burnley
13:30 GMT	Ings 20'; Boyd (yellow card) 31'; Arfield (yellow card) 52'; Ward (yellow card) 63'; Barnes (yellow card) 74'	Report	Eto'o 4', 85'; Lukaku (yellow card) 24' (goal) 29'; Naismith (yellow card) 55'	Stadium: Turf Moor; Attendance: 19,927; Referee: Andre Marriner

1 November 2014 10	Everton	0–0	Swansea City	Walton, Liverpool
15:00 GMT	Barry (yellow card) 38'; Bešić (yellow card) 90+4'	Report	Shelvey (yellow card) 24' (yellow-red card) 72'; Bony (yellow card) 33'; Williams (yellow card) 54'; Sigurðsson (yellow card) 66'	Stadium: Goodison Park; Attendance: 39,149; Referee: Kevin Friend

9 November 2014 11	Sunderland	1–1	Everton	Sunderland
13:30 GMT	Gómez (yellow card) 11'; Larsson 67'	Report	McCarthy (yellow card) 30'; McGeady (yellow card) 57'; Baines 76' (pen.)	Stadium: Stadium of Light; Attendance: 43,476; Referee: Lee Mason

22 November 2014 12	Everton	2–1	West Ham United	Walton, Liverpool
15:00 GMT	Lukaku 26'; McCarthy (yellow card) 41'; Mirallas (yellow card) 60'; Osman 73'	Report	Reid (yellow card) 41'; Zárate 56'; Tomkins (yellow card) 60'; Collins (yellow card) 74'	Stadium: Goodison Park; Attendance: 39,182; Referee: Mark Clattenburg

30 November 2014 13	Tottenham Hotspur	2–1	Everton	Tottenham
16:00 GMT	Eriksen 21' (yellow card) 90+2'; Soldado 45+1'; Chiricheș (yellow card) 56'; Lamela (yellow card) 87'; B. Davies (yellow card) 89'	Report	Mirallas 15' (yellow card) 43'	Stadium: White Hart Lane; Attendance: 35,901; Referee: Michael Oliver

3 December 2014 14	Everton	1–1	Hull City	Walton, Liverpool
19:45 GMT	Lukaku 34'; Baines (yellow card) 78'	Report	Dawson (yellow card) 24'; Aluko 59'	Stadium: Goodison Park; Attendance: 34,645; Referee: Robert Madley

6 December 2014 15	Manchester City	1–0	Everton	Manchester
15:00 GMT	Mangala (yellow card) 18'; Touré 24' (pen.) (yellow card) 88'; Fernando (yellow card) 26'	Report	Coleman (yellow card) 11'; Barry (yellow card) 52'; Barkley (yellow card) 90'	Stadium: Etihad Stadium; Attendance: 45,603; Referee: Andre Marriner

15 December 2014 16	Everton	3–1	Queens Park Rangers	Walton, Liverpool
20:00 GMT	Barkley 33'; Mirallas 43'; Onuoha 53' (o.g.); Baines (yellow card) 86'	Report	Zamora 80'; Mutch (yellow card) 89'	Stadium: Goodison Park; Attendance: 34,035; Referee: Neil Swarbrick

20 December 2014 17	Southampton	3–0	Everton	Southampton
15:00 GMT	Lukaku 38' (o.g.); Pellè 65'; Fonte (yellow card) 72'; Maya Yoshida 82'	Report	Bešić (yellow card) 68'	Stadium: St Mary's Stadium; Attendance: 31,475; Referee: Jonathan Moss

26 December 2014 18	Everton	0–1	Stoke City	Walton, Liverpool
15:00 GMT	Naismith (yellow card) 28'; Barry (yellow card) 78'	Report	Walters (yellow card) 35'; Krkić 38' (pen.); Cameron (yellow card) 83'; Adam (yellow card) 90'	Stadium: Goodison Park; Attendance: 39,166; Referee: Lee Mason

28 December 2014 19	Newcastle United	3–2	Everton	Newcastle upon Tyne
16:15 GMT	Gouffran (yellow card) 27'; Cissé 34'; Pérez 51'; Colback 68'; Dummett (yellow card) 90+4'	Report	Koné 5'; McCarthy (yellow card) 28'; Alcaraz (yellow card) 71'; Mirallas 84'	Stadium: St James' Park; Attendance: 52,313; Referee: Craig Pawson

1 January 2015 20	Hull City	2–0	Everton	Hull
15:00 GMT	Meyler (yellow card) 20'; Elmohamady 33'; Livermore (yellow card) 39'; Jelavić 43'; Maguire (yellow card) 89'	Report	Bešić (yellow card) 11'; Koné (yellow card) 45+2'; Barry (yellow card) 65'; Alcaraz (yellow card) 67' (yellow-red card) 86'	Stadium: KC Stadium; Attendance: 23,865; Referee: Kevin Friend

10 January 2015 21	Everton	1–1	Manchester City	Walton, Liverpool
15:00 GMT	Stones (yellow card) 63'; Naismith 78'	Report	Mangala (yellow card) 50'; Fernandinho (yellow card) 69' (goal) 74'	Stadium: Goodison Park; Attendance: 39,499; Referee: Martin Atkinson

19 January 2015 22	Everton	0–0	West Bromwich Albion	Walton, Liverpool
20:00 GMT	Barry (yellow card) 49'; Oviedo (yellow card) 52'; Bešić (yellow card) 77'	Report	Morrison (yellow card) 58'; Dorrans (yellow card) 90'	Stadium: Goodison Park; Attendance: 34,739; Referee: Michael Oliver

31 January 2015 23	Crystal Palace	0–1	Everton	Selhurst
15:00 GMT		Report	Lukaku 2'; Oviedo (yellow card) 80'; Robles (yellow card) 90'; Baines (yellow card) 90'	Stadium: Selhurst Park; Attendance: 25,197; Referee: Roger East

7 February 2015 24	Everton	0–0	Liverpool	Walton, Liverpool
17:30 GMT	McCarthy (yellow card) 37'; Oviedo (yellow card) 72'; Naismith (yellow card) 79'; Bešić (yellow card) 79'	Report	Henderson (yellow card) 79'	Stadium: Goodison Park; Attendance: 39,621; Referee: Anthony Taylor

11 February 2015 25	Chelsea	1–0	Everton	Fulham
19:45 GMT	Azpilicueta (yellow card) 15'; Fàbregas (yellow card) 88'; Ramires (yellow card) 89'; Willian 89'	Report	Bešić (yellow card) 17'; Barry (yellow card) 24' (yellow-red card) 88'; Coleman (yellow card) 58'; McCarthy (yellow card) 89'	Stadium: Stamford Bridge; Attendance: 41,592; Referee: Jonathan Moss

22 February 2015 26	Everton	2–2	Leicester City	Walton, Liverpool
14:05 GMT	Naismith 57'; Upson 88' (o.g.)	Report	Morgan (yellow card) 25'; Nugent 63'; Cambiasso 70'	Stadium: Goodison Park; Attendance: 38,904; Referee: Phil Dowd

1 March 2015 27	Arsenal	2–0	Everton	Holloway
14:05 GMT	Giroud 39', (yellow card) 47'; Koscielny (yellow card) 78'; Rosický 89'	Report		Stadium: Emirates Stadium; Attendance: 59,925; Referee: Andre Marriner

4 March 2015 28	Stoke City	2–0	Everton	Stoke-on-Trent
19:45 GMT	Moses 32'; Diouf 84'; Begović (yellow card) 89'; Walters (yellow card) 90+1'	Report	Barry (yellow card) 14'; Naismith (yellow card) 52'	Stadium: Britannia Stadium; Attendance: 26,431; Referee: Mark Clattenburg

15 March 2015 29	Everton	3–0	Newcastle United	Walton, Liverpool
16:00 GMT	McCarthy 20'; Lukaku 56' (pen.); Lennon (yellow card) 79'; Barkley 90+3'	Report	Taylor (yellow card) 29'; Sissoko (yellow card) 55'; Coloccini (red card) 59'	Stadium: Goodison Park; Attendance: 38,806; Referee: Martin Atkinson

22 March 2015 30	Queens Park Rangers	1–2	Everton	White City
16:00 GMT	Hoilett (yellow card) 40'; Yun (yellow card) 54'; Vargas 65'	Report	Coleman 18'; Lennon 77'; Naismith (yellow card) 90'	Stadium: Loftus Road; Attendance: 17,706; Referee: Jonathan Moss

4 April 2015 31	Everton	1–0	Southampton	Walton, Liverpool
15:00 BST	Jagielka 16'	Report	Bertrand (yellow card) 21'	Stadium: Goodison Park; Attendance: 39,390; Referee: Lee Mason

11 April 2015 32	Swansea City	1–1	Everton	Swansea
12:45 BST (UTC+01:00)	Taylor (yellow card) 52'; Emnes (yellow card) 56'; Shelvey 69' (pen.); Williams (yellow card) 80'	Report	Koné (yellow card) 25'; Lennon 41', (yellow card) 84'; Howard (yellow card) 68'	Stadium: Liberty Stadium; Attendance: 20,468; Referee: Michael Oliver

18 April 2015 33	Everton	1–0	Burnley	Walton, Liverpool
15:00 BST (UTC+01:00)	Mirallas 29' (yellow card) 51'	Report	Barnes (yellow card) 23' (red card) 45+2'; Arfield (yellow card) 53'; Shackell (yellow card) 61'	Stadium: Goodison Park; Attendance: 39,496; Referee: Mike Jones

26 April 2015 34	Everton	3–0	Manchester United	Walton, Liverpool
13:30 BST (UTC+01:00)	McCarthy 5'; Stones 35'; Mirallas 74'	Report	Fellaini (yellow card) 12'; Shaw (yellow card) 64'	Stadium: Goodison Park; Attendance: 39,497; Referee: Andre Marriner

2 May 2015 35	Aston Villa	3–2	Everton	Aston, Birmingham
15:00 BST (UTC+01:00)	Benteke 10', 45'; Cleverley 64'; Vlaar (yellow card) 84'; Given (yellow card) 90'	Report	Lukaku 59' (pen.); Coleman (yellow card) 73'; Jagielka 90'	Stadium: Villa Park; Attendance: 37,859; Referee: Mark Clattenburg

9 May 2015 36	Everton	0–2	Sunderland	Walton, Liverpool
12:45 BST (UTC+01:00)	Coleman (yellow card) 73'; Garbutt (yellow card) 88'	Report	Brown (yellow card) 42'; Graham 53'; Gómez (yellow card) 65'; Defoe (yellow card) 66', (goal) 85'	Stadium: Goodison Park; Attendance: 38,246; Referee: Lee Probert

16 May 2015 37	West Ham United	1–2	Everton	Upton Park
15:00 BST (UTC+01:00)	Reid (yellow card) 26'; Downing 62'	Report	Coleman (yellow card) 33'; Barry (yellow card) 45'; Osman 68'; McCarthy (yellow card) 74'; Galloway (yellow card) 90+1'; Lukaku 90+3'	Stadium: Boleyn Ground; Attendance: 34,977; Referee: Kevin Friend

24 May 2015 38	Everton	0–1	Tottenham Hotspur	Walton, Liverpool
15:00 BST (UTC+01:00)	Jagielka (yellow card) 81'	Report	Kane 24'; Stambouli (yellow card) 81'; Mason (yellow card) 83'	Stadium: Goodison Park; Attendance: 39,365; Referee: Jonathan Moss

Last updated: match played 24 May 2015.
Source: Everton F.C.

=== FA Cup ===
6 January 2015 Third round	Everton	1–1	West Ham United	Liverpool
19:45 GMT	Eto'o (yellow card) 66'; Lukaku (yellow card) 80', (goal) 90+1'	Report	Collins 56'; Cole (yellow card) 88'	Stadium: Goodison Park; Attendance: 22,236; Referee: Anthony Taylor

13 January 2015 Third round replay	West Ham United	2–2 (a.e.t.) (9–8 p)	Everton	Upton Park
19:45 GMT	Valencia 51'; Cole 113'	Report	McGeady (yellow card) 40' (yellow-red card) 56'; Mirallas 82'; Lukaku 97'	Stadium: Boleyn Ground; Attendance: 25,301; Referee: Neil Swarbrick
	Penalties
	Noble (penalty scored); Nolan (penalty scored); Carroll (penalty scored); Cresswell (penalty scored); Downing (penalty missed); Cole (penalty scored); Valencia (penalty scored); Amalfitano (penalty scored); Jenkinson (penalty scored); Adrián (penalty scored)		(penalty scored) Mirallas; (penalty missed) Naismith; (penalty scored) Lukaku; (penalty scored) Baines; (penalty scored) Oviedo; (penalty scored) Barry; (penalty scored) Stones; (penalty scored) Jagielka; (penalty scored) Coleman; (penalty missed) Robles

Last updated: 13 January 2015
Source: Everton F.C.

=== League Cup ===
23 September 2014 Third round	Swansea City	3–0	Everton	Swansea
19:45 BST	Fernández (yellow card) 18'; Dyer 28'; Shelvey (yellow card) 60'; Sigurðsson 64'; Emnes 87'	Report	Garbutt (yellow card) 90+3'	Stadium: Liberty Stadium; Attendance: 20,397; Referee: Roger East

Last updated: 23 September 2014
Source: Everton F.C.

=== UEFA Europa League ===
==== Group stage ====
Pos	Team	Pld	W	D	L	GF	GA	GD	Pts	Qualification	EVE	WOL	KRA	LIL
1	(England) Everton	6	3	2	1	10	3	+7	11	Advance to knockout phase	—	4–1	0–1	3–0
2	(Germany) VfL Wolfsburg	6	3	1	2	14	10	+4	10	Advance to knockout phase	0–2	—	5–1	1–1
3	(Russia) Krasnodar	6	1	3	2	7	12	−5	6		1–1	2–4	—	1–1
4	(France) Lille	6	0	4	2	3	9	−6	4		0–0	0–3	1–1	—

Source: Soccerway
Rules for classification: Group stage tiebreakers

18 September 2014 1	Everton (England)	4–1	(Germany) Wolfsburg	Liverpool, England
20:05 BST	Rodríguez 15' (o.g.); Coleman 45+1'; Baines 47' (pen.); Naismith (yellow card) 54'; Mirallas (yellow card) 72', (goal) 89'	Report	Knoche (yellow card) 46'; Rodríguez 90+4'	Stadium: Goodison Park; Attendance: 29,593; Referee: Luca Banti

2 October 2014 2	Krasnodar (Russia)	1–1	(England) Everton	Krasnodar, Russia
17:00 BST	Ari 43'	Report	Eto'o 82'; Lukaku (yellow card) 90+3'	Stadium: Kuban Stadium; Attendance: 31,050; Referee: Hüseyin Göçek, (Turkey)

23 October 2014 3	Lille (France)	0–0	(England) Everton	Villeneuve d'Ascq, France
18:00 BST	Béria (yellow card) 57'	Report	Bešić (yellow card) 15'; Pienaar (yellow card) 57'	Stadium: Stade Pierre-Mauroy; Attendance: 42,000; Referee: Manuel de Sousa (Portugal)

6 November 2014 4	Everton (England)	3–0	(France) Lille	Liverpool, England
20:05 GMT	Osman 27'; Jagielka 42'; Naismith 61'; Barry (yellow card) 67'	Report	Mavuba (yellow card) 28'; Balmont (yellow card) 86'	Stadium: Goodison Park; Attendance: 32,000; Referee: Bas Nijhuis

27 November 2014 5	Wolfsburg (Germany)	0–2	(England) Everton	Wolfsburg, Germany
18:00 GMT	Luiz Gustavo (yellow card) 45+1'; Perišić (yellow card) 57'	Report	Lukaku 43'; Bešić (yellow card) 72'; Mirallas 75'	Stadium: Volkswagen Arena; Attendance: 23,375; Referee: Fernando Teixeira Vitienes

11 December 2014 6	Everton (England)	0–1	(Russia) Krasnodar	Liverpool, England
20:05 GMT	Koné (yellow card) 43'; Pienaar (yellow card) 60'	Report	Granqvist (yellow card) 2'; Laborde 30'; Sigurðsson (yellow card) 81'	Stadium: Goodison Park; Attendance: 20,260; Referee: Istvan Kovacs

==== Round of 32 ====
19 February 2015 First leg	Young Boys (Switzerland)	1–4	(England) Everton	Bern, Switzerland
18:00 GMT	Hoarau 10'; Sanogo (yellow card) 50'; Hadergjonaj (yellow card) 90'	Report	Lukaku 24', 39', 58' (yellow card) 79'; Coleman 28'; Naismith (yellow card) 36'; Barkley (yellow card) 49'; Stones (red card) 62'	Stadium: Stade de Suisse; Referee: Aleksei Kulbakov

26 February 2015 Second leg	Everton (England)	3–1 (7–2 agg.)	(Switzerland) Young Boys	Liverpool, England
20:05	Lukaku 25' (pen.), 30'; Mirallas 42'	Report	Sanogo 13'	Stadium: Goodison Park; Referee: Stefan Johannesson

==== Round of 16 ====
12 March 2015 First leg	Everton (England)	2–1	(Ukraine) Dynamo Kyiv	Liverpool, England
20:05	Mirallas (yellow card) 16'; Naismith 39'; Lukaku 82' (pen.)	Report	Gusev 14'; Mbokani (yellow card) 90'	Stadium: Goodison Park; Attendance: 30,000; Referee: Carlos Velasco Carballo

19 March 2015 Second leg	Dynamo Kyiv (Ukraine)	5–2 (6–4 agg.)	(England) Everton	Kyiv, Ukraine
18:00	Yarmolenko 21'; Teodorczyk 35'; Veloso 37'; Gusev 56'; Antunes 76', (yellow card) 90+1'; Rybalka (yellow card) 83'; Dragović (yellow card) 85'	Report	Lukaku 29', (yellow card) 83'; Jagielka 82'; Bešić (yellow card) 90+4'	Stadium: Olympic Stadium; Referee: Deniz Aytekin (Germany)

== Statistics ==
=== Appearances ===
As of match played 24 May 2015.

No.	Pos	Nat	Player	Total		Premier League		Europa League		FA Cup		League Cup	
No.	Pos	Nat	Player	Apps	Goals	Apps	Goals	Apps	Goals	Apps	Goals	Apps	Goals
1	GK	(Spain) ESP	Joel Robles	10	0	6+1	0	1	0	2	0	0	0
2	DF	(England) ENG	Tony Hibbert	9	0	4	0	4	0	0	0	1	0
3	DF	(England) ENG	Leighton Baines	37	3	31	2	5	1	1	0	0	0
4	MF	(Republic of Ireland) IRL	Darron Gibson	14	0	3+6	0	2+2	0	0	0	1	0
5	FW	(Cameroon) CMR	Samuel Eto'o	20	4	8+6	3	3+1	1	0+1	0	1	0
6	DF	(England) ENG	Phil Jagielka	48	6	37	4	9	2	2	0	0	0
7	MF	(Republic of Ireland) IRL	Aiden McGeady	22	1	10+5	1	4	0	1+1	0	1	0
8	MF	(Costa Rica) CRC	Bryan Oviedo	11	0	2+4	0	2	0	1+1	0	1	0
9	FW	(Ivory Coast) CIV	Arouna Koné	16	1	7+5	1	1+3	0	0	0	0	0
10	FW	(Belgium) BEL	Romelu Lukaku	47	20	31+4	10	7+2	8	2	2	0+1	0
11	FW	(Belgium) BEL	Kevin Mirallas	35	11	18+10	7	5	3	1+1	1	0	0
14	FW	(Scotland) SCO	Steven Naismith	39	8	22+9	6	6	2	2	0	0	0
15	DF	(France) FRA	Sylvain Distin	18	0	12+1	0	3	0	1	0	1	0
16	MF	(Republic of Ireland) IRL	James McCarthy	37	2	27+1	2	7+1	0	0	0	0+1	0
17	MF	(Bosnia and Herzegovina) BIH	Muhamed Bešić	31	0	15+8	0	2+3	0	2	0	1	0
18	MF	(England) ENG	Gareth Barry	44	0	33	0	9	0	2	0	0	0
19	FW	(Ghana) GHA	Christian Atsu	14	0	1+5	0	3+4	0	0	0	1	0
20	MF	(England) ENG	Ross Barkley	35	2	21+7	2	4+1	0	2	0	0	0
21	MF	(England) ENG	Leon Osman	29	3	13+8	2	2+5	1	0	0	0+1	0
22	MF	(South Africa) RSA	Steven Pienaar	11	0	3+6	0	2	0	0	0	0	0
23	DF	(Republic of Ireland) IRL	Séamus Coleman	42	5	34+1	3	5	2	2	0	0	0
24	GK	(United States) USA	Tim Howard	42	0	32	0	9	0	0	0	1	0
25	MF	(England) ENG	Aaron Lennon	15	2	12+2	2	1	0	0	0	0	0
26	DF	(England) ENG	John Stones	28	1	23	1	3	0	1+1	0	0	0
27	DF	(England) ENG	Tyias Browning	3	0	0+2	0	1	0	0	0	0	0
29	DF	(England) ENG	Luke Garbutt	10	0	3+1	0	4+1	0	0	0	1	0
30	DF	(Paraguay) PAR	Antolín Alcaraz	14	0	6+2	0	4+1	0	0	0	1	0
31	MF	(Scotland) SCO	Matthew Kennedy	0	0	0	0	0	0	0	0	0	0
32	DF	(England) ENG	Brendan Galloway	2	0	2	0	0	0	0	0	0	0
33	MF	(England) ENG	John Lundstram	0	0	0	0	0	0	0	0	0	0
35	FW	(England) ENG	Conor McAleny	1	0	0	0	1	0	0	0	0	0
36	GK	(Czech Republic) CZE	Jindřich Staněk	0	0	0	0	0	0	0	0	0	0
37	FW	(England) ENG	Hallam Hope	0	0	0	0	0	0	0	0	0	0
38	DF	(England) ENG	Matthew Pennington	0	0	0	0	0	0	0	0	0	0
39	MF	(England) ENG	Conor Grant	0	0	0	0	0	0	0	0	0	0
41	FW	(England) ENG	Chris Long	1	0	0	0	0+1	0	0	0	0	0
42	MF	(England) ENG	Ryan Ledson	1	0	0	0	1	0	0	0	0	0
50	MF	(Wales) WAL	Gethin Jones	1	0	0	0	0+1	0	0	0	0	0
51	FW	(England) ENG	Kieran Dowell	1	0	0	0	0+1	0	0	0	0	0

=== Goalscorers ===
As of match played 16 May 2015.

Rank	Pos.	No.	Player	Premier League	Europa League	FA Cup	League Cup	Total
1	FW	10	(Belgium) Romelu Lukaku	10	8	2	0	20
2	FW	11	(Belgium) Kevin Mirallas	7	3	1	0	11
3	FW	14	(Scotland) Steven Naismith	6	2	0	0	8
4	DF	6	(England) Phil Jagielka	4	2	0	0	6
5	DF	23	(Republic of Ireland) Séamus Coleman	3	2	0	0	5
6	FW	5	(Cameroon) Samuel Eto'o	3	1	0	0	4
7	DF	3	(England) Leighton Baines	2	1	0	0	3
7	MF	21	(England) Leon Osman	2	1	0	0	3
9	MF	20	(England) Ross Barkley	2	0	0	0	2
9	MF	25	(England) Aaron Lennon	2	0	0	0	2
9	MF	16	(Republic of Ireland) James McCarthy	2	0	0	0	2
12	FW	9	(Ivory Coast) Arouna Koné	1	0	0	0	1
12	MF	7	(Republic of Ireland) Aiden McGeady	1	0	0	0	1
12	DF	26	(England) John Stones	1	0	0	0	1
#	Own Goals			2	1	0	0	3
Total				48	21	3	0	72

Source: Match reports in Competitions

=== Disciplinary record ===
Rank	Name	Premier League			FA Cup			League Cup			Europa League			Total		
Rank	Name	Yellow card	(yellow card) (yellow-red card)	Red card	Yellow card	(yellow card) (yellow-red card)	Red card	Yellow card	(yellow card) (yellow-red card)	Red card	Yellow card	(yellow card) (yellow-red card)	Red card	Yellow card	(yellow card) (yellow-red card)	Red card
1	(England) Gareth Barry	10	1	0	1	0	0	0	0	0	1	0	0	12	1	0
2	(Bosnia and Herzegovina) Muhamed Bešić	8	0	0	0	0	0	0	0	0	3	0	0	11	0	0
3	(Scotland) Steven Naismith	8	0	0	0	0	0	0	0	0	2	0	0	10	0	0
4	(Republic of Ireland) James McCarthy	7	0	0	0	0	0	0	0	0	0	0	0	7	0	0
5	(Belgium) Kevin Mirallas	3	0	0	1	0	0	0	0	0	2	0	0	6	0	0
6	(Republic of Ireland) Séamus Coleman	5	0	0	0	0	0	0	0	0	0	0	0	5	0	0
6	(Belgium) Romelu Lukaku	1	0	0	1	0	0	0	0	0	3	0	0	5	0	0
8	(Paraguay) Antolín Alcaraz	1	1	0	0	0	0	0	0	0	0	0	0	1	1	0
8	(England) Leighton Baines	4	0	0	0	0	0	0	0	0	0	0	0	4	0	0
8	(Republic of Ireland) Aiden McGeady	1	0	0	0	1	0	0	0	0	0	0	0	1	1	0
8	(England) John Stones	1	0	0	0	0	0	0	0	0	0	0	1	1	0	1
12	(United States) Tim Howard	3	0	0	0	0	0	0	0	0	0	0	0	3	0	0
12	(Ivory Coast) Arouna Koné	2	0	0	0	0	0	0	0	0	1	0	0	3	0	0
12	(Costa Rica) Bryan Oviedo	3	0	0	0	0	0	0	0	0	0	0	0	3	0	0
12	(South Africa) Steven Pienaar	1	0	0	0	0	0	0	0	0	2	0	0	3	0	0
16	(England) Ross Barkley	1	0	0	0	0	0	0	0	0	1	0	0	2	0	0
16	(Cameroon) Samuel Eto'o	1	0	0	1	0	0	0	0	0	0	0	0	2	0	0
16	(England) Luke Garbutt	1	0	0	0	0	0	1	0	0	0	0	0	2	0	0
16	(England) Aaron Lennon	2	0	0	0	0	0	0	0	0	0	0	0	2	0	0
16	(Spain) Joel Robles	1	0	0	1	0	0	0	0	0	0	0	0	2	0	0
21	(England) Brendan Galloway	1	0	0	0	0	0	0	0	0	0	0	0	1	0	0
21	(England) Phil Jagielka	1	0	0	0	0	0	0	0	0	0	0	0	1	0	0
Total		63	2	0	5	1	0	1	0	0	15	0	1	84	3	1

Last updated: match played 24 May 2015
Source: Match reports in Competitions

=== Home attendances ===
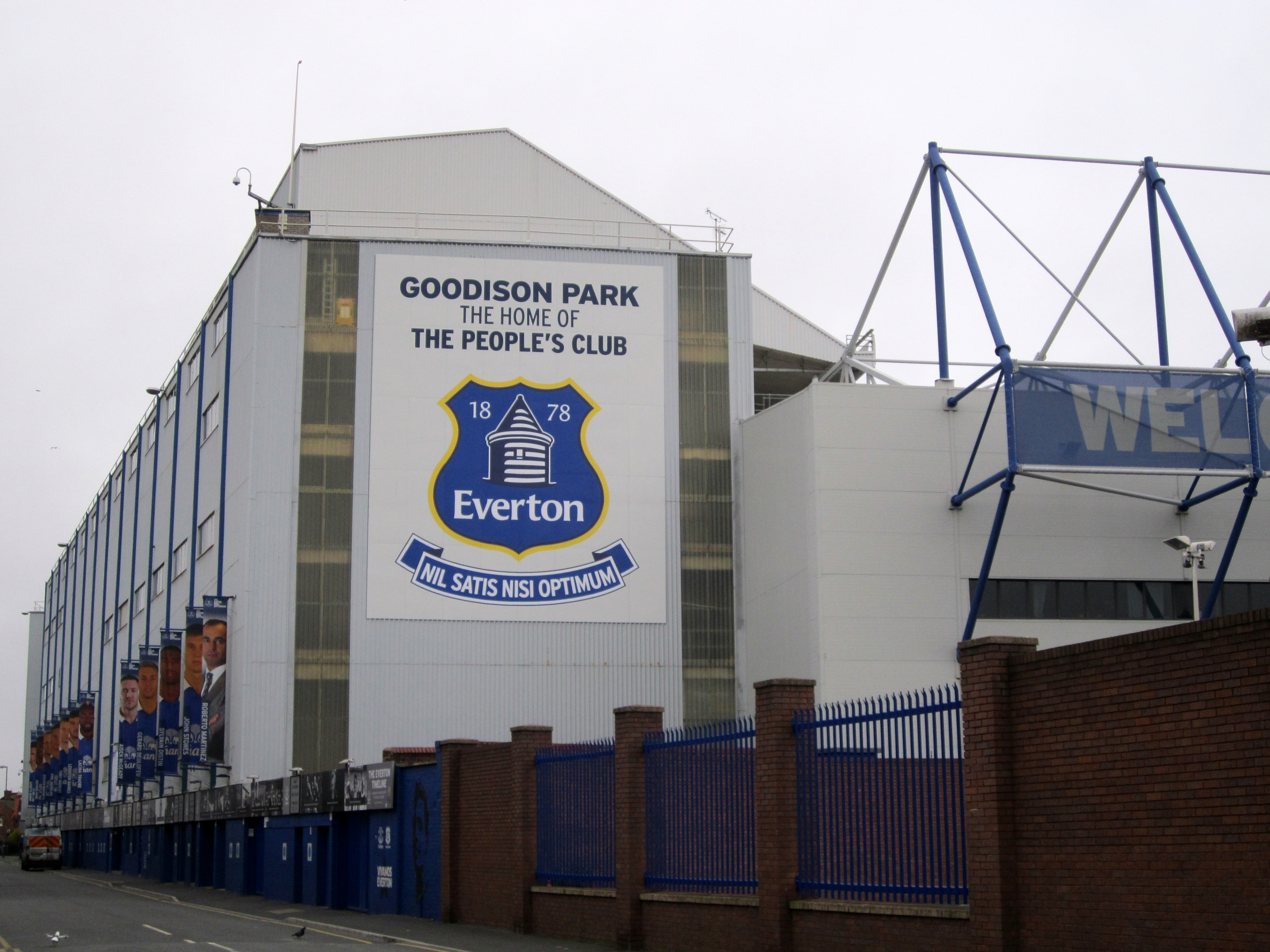
Goodison Park – Everton's home ground

Correct as of match played 24 May 2015.
Win Draw Loss

Comp	Date	Score	Opponent	Attendance
Premier League	23 August 2014	2–2	Arsenal	39,490
Premier League	30 August 2014	3–6	Chelsea	39,402
Premier League	21 September 2014	2–3	Crystal Palace	37,574
Premier League	18 October 2014	3–0	Aston Vila	39,505
Premier League	1 November 2014	0–0	Swansea City	39,149
Premier League	22 November 2014	2–1	West Ham United	39,182
Premier League	3 December 2014	1–1	Hull City	34,645
Premier League	15 December 2014	3–1	Queens Park Rangers	34,035
Premier League	26 December 2014	0–1	Stoke City	39,166
FA Cup	6 January 2015	1–1	West Ham United	22,236
Premier League	10 January 2015	1–1	Manchester City	39,499
Premier League	19 January 2015	0–0	West Bromwich Albion	34,739
Premier League	7 February 2015	0–0	Liverpool	39,621
Premier League	22 February 2015	2–2	Leicester City	38,904
Premier League	15 March 2015	3–0	Newcastle United	38,806
Premier League	4 April 2015	1–0	Southampton	39,390
Premier League	18 April 2015	1–0	Burnley	39,496
Premier League	26 April 2015	3–0	Manchester United	39,497
Premier League	9 May 2015	0–2	Sunderland	38,246
Premier League	24 May 2015	0–1	Tottenham Hotspur	39,365
			Total attendance	751,947
			Total league attendance	729,711
			Average attendance	37,597
			Average league attendance	38,406

Source: Match reports in Results

== Transfers ==
=== In ===
Player	From	Date	Fee	Ref.
(England) Gareth Barry	(England) Manchester City	8 July 2014	£2m	
(Bosnia and Herzegovina) Muhamed Bešić	(Hungary) Ferencváros	28 July 2014	Undisclosed (~ £4m)	
(Belgium) Romelu Lukaku	(England) Chelsea	30 July 2014	£28m	
(England) Brendan Galloway	(England) Milton Keynes Dons	2 August 2014	Undisclosed (~ £2m)	
(Cameroon) Samuel Eto'o	(England) Chelsea	26 August 2014	Free	

=== Out ===
Player	To	Date	Fee	Ref.
(England) Mason Springthorpe	(England) Ellesmere Rangers	23 May 2014	Free	
(England) Ibou Touray	(England) Chester	23 May 2014	Free	
(Greece) Apostolos Vellios	(Belgium) Lierse	23 May 2014	Free	
(Senegal) Magaye Gueye	(England) Millwall	13 June 2014	Free	
(Republic of Ireland) Shane Duffy	(England) Blackburn Rovers	1 September 2014	Undisclosed (~ £1.5m)	
(England) Hallam Hope	(England) Bury	1 January 2015	Undisclosed	
(Cameroon) Samuel Eto'o	(Italy) Sampdoria	24 January 2015	Undisclosed (~ £1m)	
(Scotland) Matthew Kennedy	(Wales) Cardiff City	2 February 2015	Undisclosed	

=== Loans in ===
Player	From	Date	Fee	Ref.
(Ghana) Christian Atsu	(England) Chelsea	13 August 2014	Loan	
(Belgium) David Henen	(Greece) Olympiacos	1 September 2014	Loan	
(England) Aaron Lennon	(England) Tottenham Hotspur	2 February 2015	Loan	

=== Loans out ===
Player	To	Start date	End date	Ref.
(England) John Lundstram	(England) Blackpool	6 August 2014	8 January 2015	
(Scotland) Matthew Kennedy	(Scotland) Hibernian	8 August 2014	5 January 2015	
(England) Hallam Hope	(England) Sheffield Wednesday	29 August 2014	1 January 2015	
(England) Connor Hunt	(England) Chesterfield	18 October 2014	15 November 2014	
(England) Courtney Duffus	(England) Bury	24 October 2014	January 2015	
(England) Hallam Hope	(England) Bury	11 November 2014	3 January 2015	
(England) Matthew Pennington	(England) Coventry City	27 November 2014	30 June 2015	
(England) John Lundstram	(England) Leyton Orient	9 January 2015	18 February 2015	
(England) Chris Long	(England) Brentford	20 January 2015	19 April 2015	
(England) Conor McAleny	(Wales) Cardiff City	2 February 2015	30 June 2015	
(England) Conor Grant	(Scotland) Motherwell	2 February 2015	30 June 2015	
(England) John Lundstram	(England) Scunthorpe United	19 March 2015	18 April 2015	
(Wales) Gethin Jones	(England) Plymouth Argyle	25 March 2015	30 June 2015	
(England) George Green	(England) Tranmere Rovers	26 March 2015	30 June 2015	
(Portugal) Francisco Júnior	(England) Port Vale	26 March 2015	30 June 2015	
