= Darren Randolph =

Irish footballer

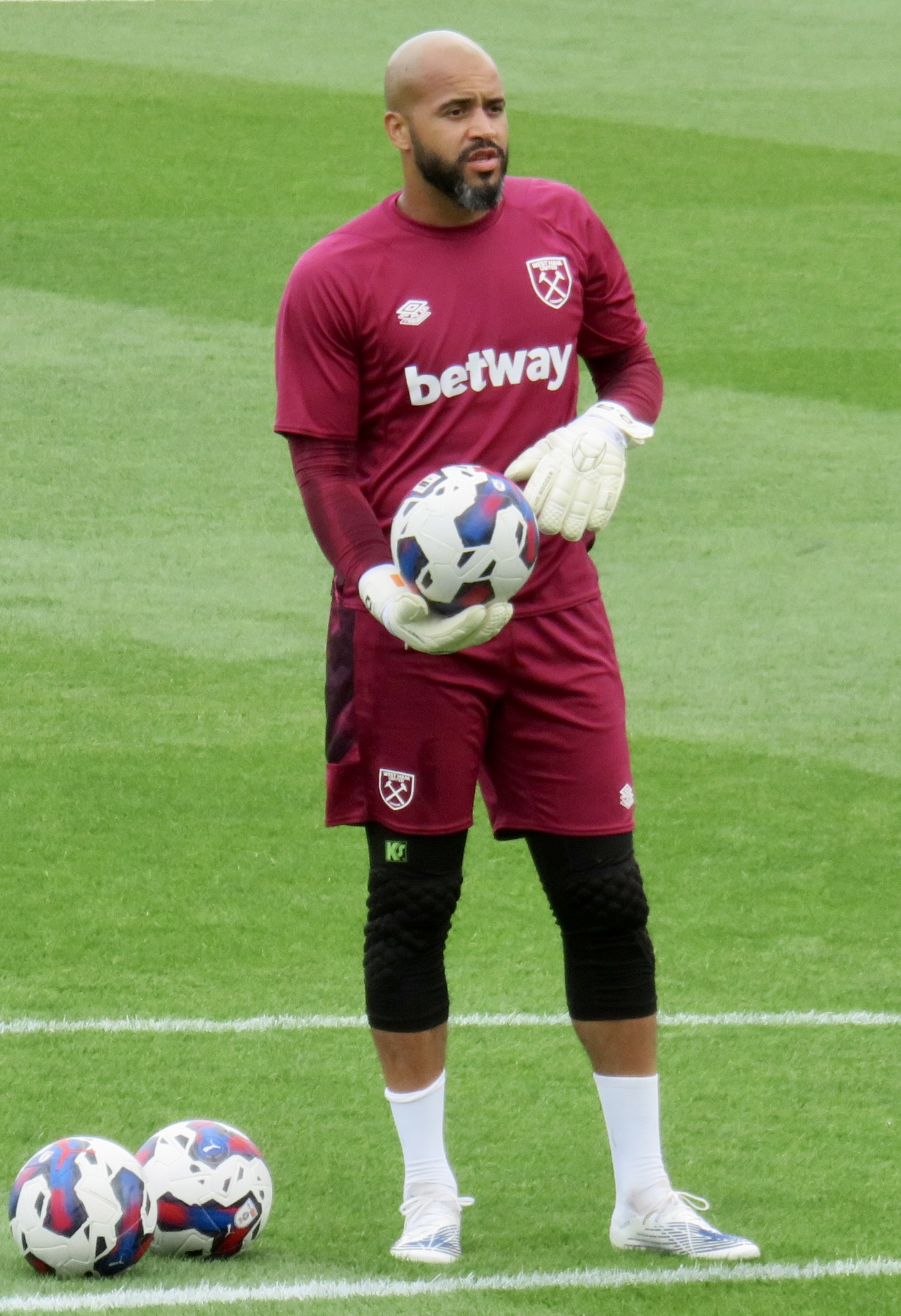
- Randolph with West Ham United in 2022

Personal information
- Full name: Darren Edward Andrew Randolph
- Date of birth: 12 May 1987 (age 39)
- Place of birth: Bray, Ireland
- Height: 1.88 m (6 ft 2 in)
- Position: Goalkeeper

Youth career
- 1998–2003: Ardmore Rovers
- 2003–2004: Charlton Athletic

Senior career*
Years	Team	Apps	(Gls)
2004–2010	Charlton Athletic	14	(0)
2004	→ Welling United (loan)	4	(0)
2005	→ Accrington Stanley (loan)	14	(0)
2006	→ Gillingham (loan)	3	(0)
2008	→ Bury (loan)	14	(0)
2008	→ Hereford United (loan)	13	(0)
2010–2013	Motherwell	111	(0)
2013–2015	Birmingham City	91	(0)
2015–2017	West Ham United	28	(0)
2017–2020	Middlesbrough	106	(0)
2020–2023	West Ham United	5	(0)
2023–2024	Bournemouth	0	(0)
Total		403	(0)

International career
2003	Republic of Ireland U17	3	(0)
2004–2006	Republic of Ireland U19	15	(0)
2006–2008	Republic of Ireland U21	8	(0)
2006	Republic of Ireland B	1	(0)
2012–2020	Republic of Ireland	50	(0)
- * Club domestic league appearances and goals

Darren Edward Andrew Randolph (born 12 May 1987) is an Irish former professional footballer who played as a goalkeeper. He represented the Republic of Ireland national team in football, and Ireland at basketball.

Having progressed through the youth ranks at Ardmore Rovers and Premier League club Charlton Athletic, Randolph turned professional in 2004 with Charlton. He spent time on loan at Welling United, Accrington Stanley and Gillingham before making his Charlton debut in the last match of the 2006–07 season. Despite the club's relegation from the Premier League, he was unable to cement a regular starting position, and had two loan spells during 2008, at Bury and at Hereford United. Having made just 20 appearances for Charlton in six years, he moved on to Scottish Premier League side Motherwell in July 2010. He played regularly for Motherwell over three years, then returned to England to join Birmingham City, for whom he missed only one Championship match in two seasons. He signed for West Ham United in 2015 and Middlesbrough two years later.

In 2006, Randolph made ten appearances for the Republic of Ireland under-21 side, and a single appearance for the Republic of Ireland B team. He made his full international debut for the Republic of Ireland in September 2012, in a 4–1 victory over Oman. He played for the nation at UEFA Euro 2016.

== Club career ==
=== Charlton Athletic ===
Randolph was born in Bray to an American father and a Mayo mother. He played school football with Ardmore Rovers. He joined Charlton Athletic in the summer of 2003 by virtue of the links between the Irish and English clubs. When leaving Ardmore Rovers, the club placed Randolph in the Hall of Fame.

As a youngster, Randolph spent a month on loan at Conference South club Welling United in 2004; he played four league matches and once in the FA Cup. He spent the beginning of the 2005–06 season on loan at Accrington Stanley in the Conference National, and at the end of the season, signed an extension to his Charlton contract to run until 2009. In August 2006 he joined League One Gillingham on a month's loan.

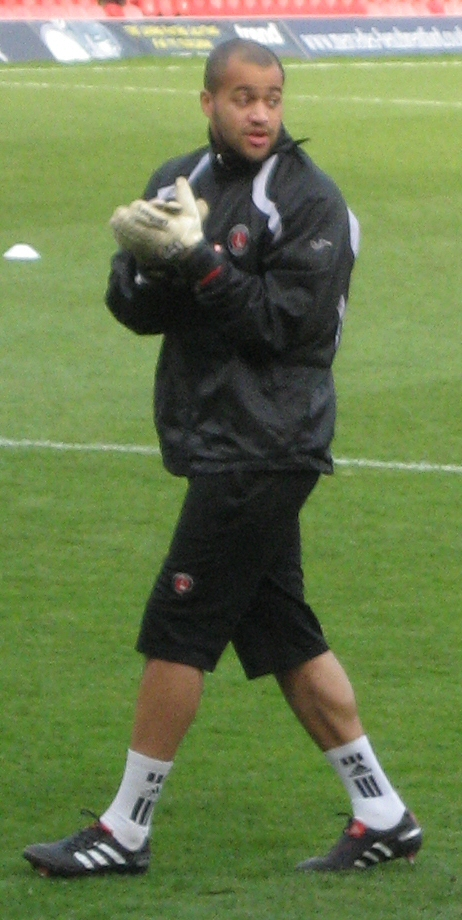
Randolph warming up for Charlton Athletic in 2009

Randolph made his first-team debut for the already relegated Charlton in their last match of the 2006–07 Premier League season, away against Liverpool. Replacing loanee Scott Carson, who was ineligible to play against his parent club, Randolph performed well, limiting Liverpool to two goals, one of which was a penalty kick in the 90th minute for a 2–2 draw. He was second-choice behind Nicky Weaver in 2007–08, and in February 2008, joined Bury of League Two on loan. After featuring 14 times, Randolph was recalled by Charlton to cover for Weaver, who was sent off in a match against Plymouth Argyle. He started Charlton's next match, at home to Southampton, and contributed to a farcical own goal when he appeared to catch a high ball, then dropped it into the net via teammate Paddy McCarthy.

Randolph joined Hereford United on a season-long loan in July 2008. He started 14 of the first 17 matches of the season, which included an "outstanding" performance against Leeds United at Elland Road, where he conceded only once from Leeds' 19 shots on target.

On 11 November 2008, it came to light that Randolph had refused to play in an FA Cup match against Dagenham & Redbridge, amid speculation that another goalkeeper would be joining Hereford. He was fined two weeks' wages and it was announced he was unlikely to play for Hereford United again. The following day, goalkeeper Matt Murray joined Hereford on a month's loan deal from Wolverhampton Wanderers. Graham Turner said in his Hereford Times column that it was a situation that he had never experienced before in nearly 30 years of management, it was not what he expected from a professional player, and had he been a contracted player, his contract would have been terminated forthwith. In response, Randolph expressed his unhappiness with Turner's statement, and received support from Charlton manager Alan Pardew. Randolph made no more appearances for Hereford, and returned to Charlton in January 2009.

In his second match back, on 17 January 2009, Randolph conceded four goals in a Championship match against Sheffield Wednesday. This was to be his last appearance of the season. Nevertheless, he was offered, and eventually signed, a one-year contract ahead of the 2009–10 season. He was again second choice, this time behind Rob Elliot, and made his first appearance of the season in November, in the FA Cup against Northwich Victoria. Despite "a string of stunning first half saves", the Conference North team won 1–0 to inflict what the local newspaper described as the "most embarrassing defeat in the club's 104-year history". Randolph regained his starting place in March 2010 after Elliot was injured, and kept it for the remainder of the season, including the play-offs, in which Charlton lost on penalties to Swindon Town in the semi-finals.

=== Motherwell ===
Although Charlton offered Randolph a new contract, he chose instead to join Scottish Premier League club Motherwell on 1 July 2010 on a free transfer. He signed a three-year contract at Fir Park. Randolph made his Motherwell debut in the second qualifying round of the Europa League, in a 1–0 win over Icelandic side Breiðablik. The club were eliminated by Danish club OB in the play-off round; Motherwell complained to UEFA about OB fans throwing cigarette lighters at Randolph during the first leg. Randolph established himself as first-choice goalkeeper; in his first season, he broke John Ruddy's club record of 15 clean sheets on 27 February 2011 in a 2–0 win over Celtic. He helped Motherwell reach the 2011 Scottish Cup Final, but they lost 3–0 to Celtic; he suggested afterwards that Motherwell had been unlucky.

Randolph began the 2011–12 SPL season with four clean sheets, and finished it as an ever-present. On 28 April 2012, he provided an assist for Henrik Ojamaa's second goal of the match in a 5–1 win over St Johnstone. He was the only Motherwell player to be named in the PFA Scotland Team of the Year.

Because 2011–12 runners-up Rangers entered administration, they were ineligible for UEFA competitions, so Motherwell's third-place finish earned the club entry into the Champions League for the first time. Randolph made his Champions League debut against Panathinaikos in the third qualifying round. Motherwell lost 5–0 on aggregate to go out of the competition, but entered the Europa League play-off round. Randolph played in both legs against Spanish side Levante but his team were again eliminated.

In a 0–0 draw against Heart of Midlothian on 24 November 2012, Randolph caught Hearts' Callum Paterson's head with his leg as he challenged for a high ball; no card was issued, leading Hearts' manager John McGlynn to describe Randolph as a "lucky man". A few days later, the Scottish Football Association charged Randolph with "violent conduct by kicking an opposing player" and offered a two-match ban; Motherwell appealed, but the ban was upheld. Together with teammates Shaun Hutchinson, Nicky Law and Michael Higdon, Randolph was named in the 2012–13 PFA Scotland Team of the Year. Motherwell finished the season in second place behind Celtic, so qualified for Europe for the second year running.

=== Birmingham City ===
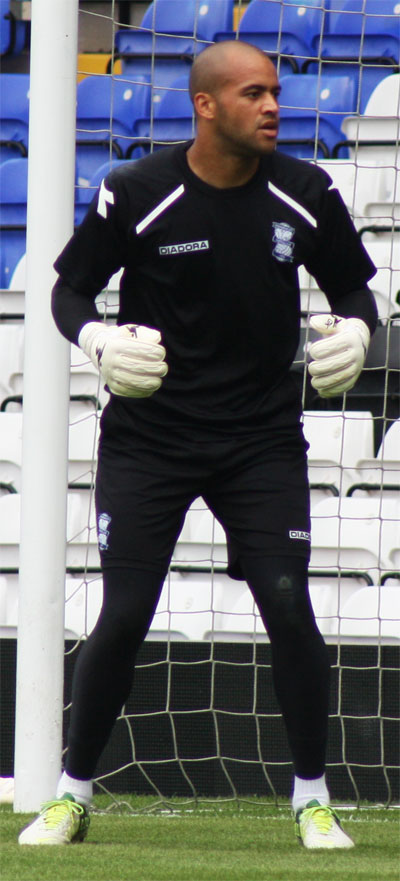
Randolph warming up for Birmingham City in 2013

With Randolph's contract due to expire at the end of the season, Motherwell manager Stuart McCall said in mid-April that there was only a "slim possibility" of keeping him at the club. On 10 May 2013, McCall confirmed that Randolph would be leaving, and four days later, English Championship club Birmingham City announced that Randolph would join them on a free transfer once his Motherwell contract expired. He signed a two-year contract to commence on 1 July. He went straight into the starting eleven, made his debut in a 1–0 defeat at home to Watford on 3 August, and remained ever-present in Championship matches throughout the season, though Colin Doyle played in all Birmingham's cup ties.

The unbroken run continued into the next season, until Randolph was sent off late in the home defeat to Bolton Wanderers on 18 October 2014 for bringing down Craig Davies (who missed the ensuing penalty), so was suspended for the next match. He was ever-present in league matches for what remained of the season, and also made his first cup appearance for the club, in the FA Cup fourth-round defeat by West Bromwich Albion. Manager Gary Rowett said that had a Premier League club made a bid for Randolph's services in the January transfer window, he would not have stopped him leaving, but he wanted to keep him at Birmingham. The club confirmed in May that he had rejected the offer of a contract extension, and would leave as a free agent under the Bosman ruling at the end of his existing deal.

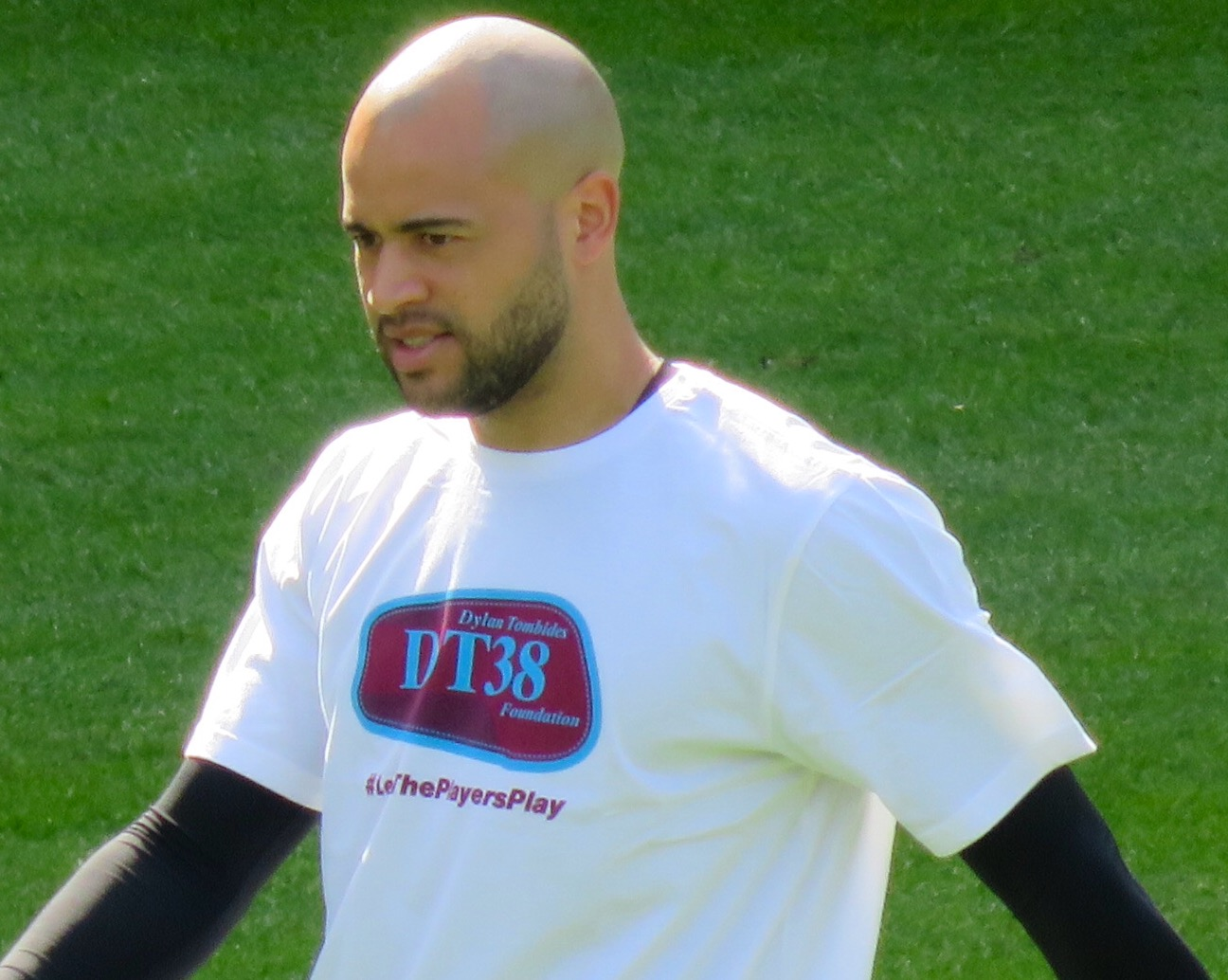
Randolph warming up for West Ham United in 2016

=== West Ham United ===
On 30 May 2015, West Ham United confirmed that Randolph would join the club on 1 July when his contract with Birmingham expired. He made his debut on 2 July in a 3–0 victory over Lusitanos in a Europa League qualifying match. Randolph made his league debut for West Ham in a 4–3 home defeat to AFC Bournemouth on 22 August 2015. He continued in goal, and kept a clean sheet in a 3–0 win against Liverpool on 29 August which was West Ham's first league win at Anfield since 1963. Randolph played in West Ham's last three matches of the 2015–16 season which included their final match at the Boleyn Ground, a 3–2 victory over Manchester United. He played in 15 matches in all competitions over the season. In July 2016, Randolph signed a new, four-year contract with West Ham. Following a goalkeeping error by first choice goalkeeper, Adrián, in a match against Stoke City in November 2016, Randolph became West Ham's regular goalkeeper.

=== Middlesbrough ===
On 22 July 2017, Randolph signed a four-year contract with Championship club Middlesbrough, for a reported transfer fee of £5 million. The player made his first appearance for the club on 29 July 2017, in a 2–1 friendly victory over FC Augsburg. Following his arrival, he was reunited with former West Ham United teammate, Ashley Fletcher, who signed for Middlesbrough on 28 July. On 1 August 2017, it was confirmed that Randolph would wear the number 25 shirt for the 2017–18 season. Randolph made his league debut for Middlesbrough on 5 August 2017 away to Wolverhampton Wanderers, which resulted in a 1–0 defeat. He held his first clean sheet the following week, when his team won 1–0 to division newcomers Sheffield United at the Riverside Stadium. He held a second consecutive clean sheet in their next fixture, a 2–0 victory at home against Burton Albion.

In March 2019 he was selected to the 2018–19 Championship Team of the Season.

=== Return to West Ham United ===
On 15 January 2020, it was announced that Randolph was returning to West Ham following an agreement with Middlesbrough. The transfer fee was reported as £4 million. He played 5 league matches over the 3 years he stayed at the club.

=== AFC Bournemouth ===
On 26 January 2023, Randolph joined Bournemouth on an 18-month contract.

On 5 June 2024, the club announced he would leave in the summer when his contract expired. Randolph did not make a competitive appearance for the club during his one-and-a-half-year stint.

== International career ==
Randolph has represented the Republic of Ireland at U15, U16, U17, U18, U19, U21, B, and senior levels. He was called up to the Republic of Ireland senior squad for the first time in March 2011 for a match against Macedonia. He was again called up in May, for match against Northern Ireland and Scotland in the Nations Cup, but again did not feature.

Randolph made his full international debut in a friendly against Oman on 11 September 2012, coming on as a substitute in a 4–1 win. His second Republic of Ireland appearance was against Spain on 12 June 2013, again as a substitute; he made a "brilliant fingertip save" from Santi Cazorla before conceding a late goal by Juan Mata as Spain won 2–0. On 8 October 2015, Randolph replaced Shay Given in the 44th minute against Germany in a 2016 European Championship qualifying match and provided the long ball assist for Shane Long's winner in the 70th minute in a match won 1–0 by the Republic of Ireland. Randolph played every match for the Republic of Ireland at Euro 2016, against Sweden, Belgium and Italy before being defeated by France. Randolph retired from international football in 2020 after the Nations League after picking up an injury.

== Personal life ==
His father Ed Randolph played basketball for UCD Marian and was one of the first American imports to the Irish Basketball League. His mother, Anne Randolph (née Walsh), is a folk singer originally from Kiltimagh, County Mayo. He is a past pupil of St. Cronan's Boys National School and Presentation College, Bray. He had a long-term relationship with Rochelle Wiseman from girl group The Saturdays.

Randolph and singer Alexandra Burke began a relationship in 2021, and their first child was born in July 2022. They got engaged in September 2024.

Randolph leads the Darren Randolph Academy, a goalkeeping academy run with the aim of giving back to the young goalkeepers of Ireland and helping them to progress. It also has a range of sportswear.

Darren Randolph is a regular pundit on talkSPORT Ireland's Premier League show, The Insight, and also led their 2026 World Cup coverage alongside former Ireland teammate Alan Judge.

== Career statistics ==
=== Club ===
As of 26 January 2023

Appearances and goals by club, season and competition
Club	Season	League			National Cup (Note: Includes FA Cup, Scottish Cup)		League Cup (Note: Includes Football League Cup/EFL Cup, Scottish League Cup)		Europe		Other		Total	
Club	Season	Division	Apps	Goals	Apps	Goals	Apps	Goals	Apps	Goals	Apps	Goals	Apps	Goals
Charlton Athletic	2004–05	Premier League	0	0	0	0	—		—		—		0	0
Charlton Athletic	2005–06	Premier League	0	0	0	0	—		—		—		0	0
Charlton Athletic	2006–07	Premier League	1	0	0	0	—		—		—		1	0
Charlton Athletic	2007–08	Championship	1	0	0	0	2	0	—		—		3	0
Charlton Athletic	2008–09	Championship	1	0	1	0	—		—		—		2	0
Charlton Athletic	2009–10	League One	11	0	1	0	0	0	—		2 (Note: Appearances in League One play-offs)	0	14	0
Charlton Athletic	Total		14	0	2	0	2	0	—		2	0	20	0
Welling United (loan)	2004–05	Conference South	4	0	1	0	—		—		—		5	0
Accrington Stanley (loan)	2005–06	Conference National	14	0	0	0	—		—		—		14	0
Gillingham (loan)	2006–07	League One	3	0	—		1	0	—		0	0	4	0
Bury (loan)	2007–08	League Two	14	0	—		—		—		—		14	0
Hereford United (loan)	2008–09	League One	13	0	0	0	1	0	—		0	0	14	0
Motherwell	2010–11	Scottish Premier League	37	0	6	0	3	0	6 (Note: Appearances in UEFA Europa League)	0	—		52	0
Motherwell	2011–12	Scottish Premier League	38	0	3	0	1	0	—		—		42	0
Motherwell	2012–13	Scottish Premier League	36	0	1	0	1	0	4 (Note: Two appearances in UEFA Champions League, two in UEFA Europa League)	0	—		42	0
Motherwell	Total		111	0	10	0	5	0	10	0	—		136	0
Birmingham City	2013–14	Championship	46	0	0	0	0	0	—		—		46	0
Birmingham City	2014–15	Championship	45	0	1	0	0	0	—		—		46	0
Birmingham City	Total		91	0	1	0	0	0	—		—		92	0
West Ham United	2015–16	Premier League	6	0	6	0	0	0	3	0	—		15	0
West Ham United	2016–17	Premier League	22	0	0	0	2	0	3	0	—		27	0
West Ham United	Total		28	0	6	0	2	0	6	0	—		42	0
Middlesbrough	2017–18	Championship	46	0	2	0	0	0	—		2 (Note: Appearances in Championship play-offs)	0	50	0
Middlesbrough	2018–19	Championship	46	0	1	0	1	0	—		—		48	0
Middlesbrough	2019–20	Championship	14	0	0	0	0	0	—		—		14	0
Middlesbrough	Total		106	0	3	0	1	0	—		2	0	112	0
West Ham United	2019–20	Premier League	2	0	1	0	—		—		—		3	0
West Ham United	2020–21	Premier League	3	0	1	0	3	0	—		—		7	0
West Ham United	2021–22	Premier League	0	0	0	0	0	0	0	0	—		0	0
West Ham United	2022–23	Premier League	0	0	0	0	0	0	0	0	—		0	0
West Ham United	Total		5	0	2	0	3	0	0	0	—		10	0
AFC Bournemouth	2022–23	Premier League	0	0	0	0	0	0	—		—		0	0
AFC Bournemouth	2023–24	Premier League	0	0	0	0	0	0	—		—		0	0
AFC Bournemouth	Total		0	0	0	0	0	0	—		—		0	0
Career total			403	0	25	0	14	0	16	0	4	0	462	0

=== International ===
As of 18 November 2020

Appearances and goals by national team and year
National team	Year	Apps	Goals
Republic of Ireland	2012	1	0
Republic of Ireland	2013	1	0
Republic of Ireland	2015	4	0
Republic of Ireland	2016	12	0
Republic of Ireland	2017	10	0
Republic of Ireland	2018	6	0
Republic of Ireland	2019	8	0
Republic of Ireland	2020	8	0
Republic of Ireland	Total	50	0

== Honours ==
Accrington Stanley

- Conference National: 2005–06

Motherwell

- Scottish Cup runner-up: 2010–11

Individual

- PFA Scotland Team of the Year: 2011–12, 2012–13
- PFA Team of the Year: 2018–19 Championship
- Middlesbrough Player of the Year: 2019
