= 2017–18 Middlesbrough F.C. season =

Middlesbrough
2017–18 season
- Chairman: Steve Gibson
- Manager: Garry Monk (until 23 December 2017); Tony Pulis (from 26 December 2017)
- Stadium: Riverside Stadium
- Championship: 5th
- FA Cup: Fourth round
- EFL Cup: Fourth round
- Top goalscorer: League: Britt Assombalonga (14); All: Britt Assombalonga (14)
Home colours	Away colours

The 2017–18 season was Middlesbrough's first season back in the Championship, making an immediate return to the division following relegation from the Premier League in the previous season. In their 142nd year in existence, the club also competed in the FA Cup and the EFL Cup.

The season covers the period from 1 July 2017 to 30 June 2018, with all competitive games played between August 2017 and May 2018. Two transfer windows took place, the first from 1 July to 31 August 2017, the second from 1 January to 31 January 2018.

Garry Monk was appointed as manager in June 2017, however he parted company with the club in late December after an unconvincing start to the season, with the club in 9th position. Tony Pulis replaced him on 26 December, and took charge of the team after Middlesbrough's Boxing Day fixture against Bolton Wanderers.

== Changes ==
The first and most crucial change this season is that the club will play in the EFL Championship, having been relegated from the Premier League in the previous season. Aitor Karanka, who had managed the club from November 2013, was sacked in March 2017 after a poor run of results, having not won in ten matches and having occupied a place in the relegation zone. Prior to his sacking, tensions had mounted between Karanka and both the club's board and fans surrounding Middlesbrough's January transfer activity and frustration from supporters over the poor results and perceived poor style of play. Karanka's assistant manager, Steve Agnew, served as caretaker manager until the end of the season. On 9 June 2017, it was confirmed that former Swansea City and Leeds United manager Garry Monk would become the new manager for the 2017–18 season.

Nathan Convery, Bradley Fewster, Brandon Holdsworth, Lewis Maloney, Niall McGoldrick, Junior Mondal, Josef Wheatley, Matthew Wilson, Víctor Valdés, Brad Guzan and Viktor Fischer were amongst the first players to leave the club in the summer 2017 transfer window. Further departures would include Bernardo Espinosa and Cristhian Stuani, who both completed moves to Girona, while James Husband would leave for Norwich City, defender Antonio Barragán would depart on a season-long loan to Spanish club Real Betis, midfielder Gastón Ramírez would depart for Sampdoria, and the club also terminated the contract of Carlos de Pena by mutual consent.

Monk's first major signings included Norwich City midfielder Jonny Howson, Derby County right-back Cyrus Christie, Toulouse striker Martin Braithwaite, Nottingham Forest striker Britt Assombalonga, as well as goalkeeper Darren Randolph, and striker Ashley Fletcher, both moving from West Ham United.

== Squad ==
=== First team squad ===
As of 1 February 2018.

Squad No.	Name	Nationality	Position(s)	Date of Birth (Age)	Previous Team
Goalkeepers
1	Dimitrios Konstantopoulos	(Greece)	GK	29 November 1978 (age 47)	(Greece) AEK Athens
13	Tomás Mejías	(Spain)	GK	30 January 1989 (age 37)	(Spain) Real Madrid
25	Darren Randolph	(Republic of Ireland)	GK	12 May 1987 (age 39)	(England) West Ham United
Defenders
2	Fábio	(Brazil)	FB	9 July 1990 (age 36)	(Wales) Cardiff City
3	George Friend	(England)	LB	17 October 1987 (age 38)	(England) Doncaster Rovers
4	Daniel Ayala	(Spain)	CB	7 November 1990 (age 35)	(England) Norwich City
5	Ryan Shotton	(England)	RB / CB	30 October 1988 (age 37)	(England) Birmingham City
6	Ben Gibson	(England)	CB	15 January 1993 (age 33)	Academy
14	Martin Cranie	(England)	CB / RB	26 September 1986 (age 40)	(England) Huddersfield Town
20	Dael Fry	(England)	CB / RB	30 August 1997 (age 29)	Academy
Midfielders
7	Grant Leadbitter	(England)	DM / CM	7 January 1986 (age 40)	(England) Ipswich Town
8	Adam Clayton	(England)	DM / CM	14 January 1989 (age 37)	(England) Huddersfield Town
16	Jonny Howson	(England)	CM	21 May 1988 (age 38)	(England) Norwich City
19	Stewart Downing	(England)	AM / LM / RM	22 July 1984 (age 42)	(England) West Ham United
21	Marvin Johnson	(England)	LW	1 December 1990 (age 35)	(England) Oxford United
23	Jack Harrison L	(England)	RW	20 November 1996 (age 29)	(England) Manchester City
27	Muhamed Bešić L	(Bosnia and Herzegovina)	CM	10 September 1992 (age 34)	(England) Everton
30	Lewis Baker L	(England)	CM	25 April 1995 (age 31)	(England) Chelsea
37	Adama Traoré	(Spain)	RW	25 January 1996 (age 30)	(England) Aston Villa
Strikers
9	Britt Assombalonga	(Democratic Republic of the Congo)	ST	6 December 1992 (age 33)	(England) Nottingham Forest
11	Patrick Bamford	(England)	CF	5 September 1993 (age 33)	(England) Chelsea
39	Rudy Gestede	(Benin)	FW	10 October 1988 (age 37)	(England) Aston Villa

- L = Player on Loan

== Pre-season ==
=== Friendlies ===
As of 3 July 2017, Middlesbrough have announced five pre-season friendlies, against Mansfield Town, Rochdale, Oxford United, Chesterfield and FC Augsburg.

12 July 2017	Oxford United	0–0	Middlesbrough	Albufeira, Portugal
18:30 WEST		Report		Stadium: Estádio da Nora

15 July 2017	Chesterfield	0–2	Middlesbrough	Santo António, Portugal
18:30 WEST		Report	Stuani 19'; Bamford 65' (pen.)	Stadium: Complexo Desportivo de Vila Real de Santo António

19 July 2017	Mansfield Town	2–2	Middlesbrough	Mansfield
19:30 BST	Howson 13' (o.g.); Angol 18'	Report	Soisalo 19'; Fry 28'	Stadium: Field Mill; Attendance: 1,931; Referee: Ross Joyce

22 July 2017	Rochdale	2–0	Middlesbrough	Spotland
15:00 BST	Ayala 51' (o.g.); Rathbone 87'	Report		Stadium: Spotland Stadium; Attendance: 1,608; Referee: Darren Handley

29 July 2017	Middlesbrough	2–1	FC Augsburg	Middlesbrough
15:00 BST	Braithwaite 37'; Forshaw 90'	Report	Stafylidis 2'	Stadium: Riverside Stadium

== Competitions ==
=== Championship ===
==== League table ====
Pos	Team	Pld	W	D	L	GF	GA	GD	Pts	Promotion, qualification or relegation
3	Fulham (O, P)	46	25	13	8	79	46	+33	88	Qualification for Championship play-offs (Note: Four teams play for one spot and promotion to the Premier League.)
4	Aston Villa	46	24	11	11	72	42	+30	83	Qualification for Championship play-offs
5	Middlesbrough	46	22	10	14	67	45	+22	76	Qualification for Championship play-offs
6	Derby County	46	20	15	11	70	48	+22	75	Qualification for Championship play-offs
7	Preston North End	46	19	16	11	57	46	+11	73	

Source: English Football League
Rules for classification: 1) Points; 2) Goal difference; 3) Number of goals scored
(O) Play-off winners; (P) Promoted

==== Result summary ====
Overall								Home						Away					
Pld	W	D	L	GF	GA	GD	Pts	W	D	L	GF	GA	GD	W	D	L	GF	GA	GD
46	22	10	14	67	45	+22	76	14	3	6	33	17	+16	8	7	8	34	28	+6

Last updated: 6 May 2018.

==== Results by matchday ====
Matchday	1	2	3	4	5	6	7	8	9	10	11	12	13	14	15	16	17	18	19	20	21	22	23	24	25	26	27	28	29	30	31	32	33	34	35	36	37	38	39	40	41	42	43	44	45	46
Ground	A	H	H	A	H	A	A	H	A	H	H	A	H	A	A	H	A	H	H	A	H	A	A	H	H	A	H	A	H	A	H	A	H	A	H	A	H	A	H	A	H	A	H	A	H	A
Result	L	W	W	L	D	W	D	W	D	L	D	D	L	W	W	W	L	W	L	L	W	L	W	W	L	W	L	W	D	L	W	L	W	D	W	W	W	D	L	D	W	L	W	W	W	D
Position	20	12	4	9	9	6	9	7	6	9	11	11	13	12	8	5	6	6	7	9	8	10	9	7	9	8	9	8	8	9	9	9	8	8	7	6	6	6	6	6	6	7	5	5	5	5

Updated to match(es) played on 22 April 2018. Source: Statto.com
A = Away; H = Home; W = Win; D = Draw; L = Loss

==== Matches ====
5 August 2017 1	Wolverhampton Wanderers	1–0	Middlesbrough	Wolverhampton
15:00 BST	Miranda (yellow card) 28'; Bonatini 33'	Report	Clayton (yellow card) 58'; Forshaw (yellow card) 90+4'	Stadium: Molineux Stadium; Attendance: 29,692; Referee: Darren Bond

12 August 2017 2	Middlesbrough	1–0	Sheffield United	Middlesbrough
17:30 BST	Gestede 20'; Friend (yellow card) 75'	Report	Stevens (yellow card) 63'	Stadium: Riverside Stadium; Attendance: 26,876; Referee: Peter Bankes

15 August 2017 3	Middlesbrough	2–0	Burton Albion	Middlesbrough
19:45 BST	Clayton (yellow card) 12'; Assombalonga 23', 60'	Report	Lund (yellow card) 26'; Naylor (yellow card) 70'; Akpan (red card) 78'	Stadium: Riverside Stadium; Attendance: 24,522; Referee: Tim Robinson

19 August 2017 4	Nottingham Forest	2–1	Middlesbrough	Nottingham
15:00 BST	Darikwa (yellow card) 15'; McKay 16'; Traoré (yellow card) 19'; Murphy 79' (pen.)	Report	Clayton (yellow card) 39'; Fry (yellow card) 63'; Assombalonga (yellow card) 76'; Gibson 83' (yellow card) 89'	Stadium: City Ground; Attendance: 26,265; Referee: Graham Scott

26 August 2017 5	Middlesbrough	0–0	Preston North End	Middlesbrough
15:00 BST	Clayton (yellow card) 65'	Report	Pearson (yellow card) 63'; Harrop (yellow card) 89'	Stadium: Riverside Stadium; Attendance: 25,295; Referee: Darren England

9 September 2017 6	Bolton Wanderers	0–3	Middlesbrough	Horwich
15:00 BST	Karacan (yellow card) 10'	Report	Assombalonga 13', 71'; Traoré (yellow card) 45+1'; Johnson 78'	Stadium: Macron Stadium; Attendance: 17,385; Referee: Geoff Eltringham

12 September 2017 7	Aston Villa	0–0	Middlesbrough	Aston
19:30 BST	Snodgrass (yellow card) 31'; Lansbury (red card) 64'; Kodjia (yellow card) 83'	Report	Traoré (red card) 4'; Christie (yellow card) 80'	Stadium: Villa Park; Attendance: 26,631; Referee: James Linington

16 September 2017 8	Middlesbrough	3–2	Queens Park Rangers	Middlesbrough
15:00 BST	Clayton (yellow card) 34'; Leadbitter (yellow card) 39'; Baker 36' (yellow card) 66'; Fletcher 55'; Assombalonga 60'; Christie (yellow card) 66'	Report	Wheeler 2'; Luongo (yellow card) 32'; Wszołek (yellow card) 47'; Mackie 50' (yellow card) 66'; Smithies (yellow card) 52'	Stadium: Riverside Stadium; Attendance: 24,790; Referee: Darren Bond

23 September 2017 9	Fulham	1–1	Middlesbrough	Craven Cottage, London
15:00 BST	Kamara 86'	Report	Christie 88'	Attendance: 20,718; Referee: Oliver Langford

26 September 2017 10	Middlesbrough	0–1	Norwich City	Middlesbrough
19:45 BST	Howson (yellow card) 71'	Report	Maddison 13'; Wildschut (yellow card) 28'; Pinto (yellow card) 54'; Tettey (yellow card) 62'; Stiepermann (yellow card) 82'	Stadium: Riverside Stadium; Attendance: 24,084; Referee: Jeremy Simpson

30 September 2017 11	Middlesbrough	2–2	Brentford	Middlesbrough
15:00 BST	Braithwaite 68'; Christie (yellow card) 70'; Fábio 76'; Bamford (yellow card) 90+4'; Randolph (yellow card) 90+6'	Report	Barbet 29'; Dalsgaard (yellow card) 67'; Watkins 72' (yellow card) 90+5'; Maupay (yellow card) 90+6'	Stadium: Riverside Stadium; Attendance: 24,545; Referee: Paul Tierney

14 October 2017 12	Barnsley	2–2	Middlesbrough	Barnsley
15:00 BST	Fletcher 3' (o.g.); McGeehan 9'; Pearson (yellow card) 73'; Williams (yellow card) 74'	Report	Braithwaite 7'; Assombalonga 60'	Stadium: Oakwell; Attendance: 17,163; Referee: Lee Mason

21 October 2017 13	Middlesbrough	0–1	Cardiff City	Middlesbrough
15:00 BST	Gibson (yellow card) 20'; Leadbitter (yellow card) 66'	Report	Bennett (yellow card) 39'; Bamba (yellow card) 59'; Ralls 84' (pen.)	Stadium: Riverside Stadium; Attendance: 24,806; Referee: Andrew Madley

28 October 2017 14	Reading	0–2	Middlesbrough	Reading
15:00 BST	McShane (yellow card) 45+1'	Report	Leadbitter 14' (pen.); Assombalonga (yellow card) 49' (goal) 74'	Stadium: Madejski Stadium; Attendance: 17,928; Referee: Oliver Langford

31 October 2017 15	Hull City	1–3	Middlesbrough	Kingston upon Hull
19:45 GMT	Grosicki 72' (yellow card) 90+1'; Hector (red card) 83'; Irvine (yellow card) 90+1'	Report	Braithwaite 13'; Assombalonga 36'; Ayala (yellow card) 56'; Howson (yellow card) 81'; Leadbitter 85' (pen.)	Stadium: KCOM Stadium; Attendance: 15,454; Referee: Tim Robinson

5 November 2017 16	Middlesbrough	1–0	Sunderland	Middlesbrough
12:00 GMT	Tavernier 6'; Christie (yellow card) 63'	Report	Jones (yellow card) 17'; Cattermole (yellow card) 45'; McGeady (yellow card) 60'; Wilson (yellow card) 75'	Stadium: Riverside Stadium; Attendance: 29,277; Referee: Jeremy Simpson

19 November 2017 17	Leeds United	2–1	Middlesbrough	Leeds
13:15 GMT	Hernández 25' (yellow card) 90+2'; Berardi (yellow card) 33'; Jansson (yellow card) 34'; Alioski 54'; Ayling (yellow card) 76'; Phillips (yellow card) 87'	Report	Friend (yellow card) 30'; Howson (yellow card) 61'; Assombalona 78' (pen.) (yellow card) 86'	Stadium: Elland Road; Attendance: 33,771; Referee: Keith Stroud

22 November 2017 18	Middlesbrough	2–0	Birmingham City	Middlesbrough
19:45 GMT	Assombalonga 10', 41'; Howson (yellow card) 56'	Report	Maghoma (yellow card) 81'	Stadium: Riverside Stadium; Attendance: 22,848; Referee: Darren England

25 November 2017 19	Middlesbrough	0–3	Derby County	Middlesbrough
15:00 GMT	Ayala (yellow card) 15' (yellow-red card) 60'; Fabio (yellow card) 53'	Report	Vydra 13', 47' (pen.), 63'; Huddlestone (yellow card) 53'; Ledley (yellow card) 77'	Stadium: Riverside Stadium; Attendance: 24,607; Referee: Simon Hooper

2 December 2017 20	Bristol City	2–1	Middlesbrough	Ashton Gate
17:30 GMT	Bryan 51' (yellow card) 61'; Paterson 54'; Smith (yellow card) 90+4'	Report	Gibson (yellow card) 56'; Magnússon 75' (o.g.); Christie (yellow card) 90+2'	Stadium: Ashton Gate Stadium; Attendance: 18,752; Referee: Stephen Martin

9 December 2017 21	Middlesbrough	2–0	Ipswich Town	Middlesbrough
15:00 GMT	Leadbitter (yellow card) 21'; Ayala (yellow card) 32'; Braithwaite 44' (yellow card) 90'; Bamford 51'	Report	Celina (yellow card) 59'	Stadium: Riverside Stadium; Attendance: 22,989; Referee: Robert Jones

16 December 2017 22	Millwall	2–1	Middlesbrough	South Bermondsey
15:00 GMT	Wallace 31'; Saville 37'	Report	Downing 67'	Stadium: The Den; Attendance: 12,026; Referee: Oliver Langford

23 December 2017 23	Sheffield Wednesday	1–2	Middlesbrough	Sheffield
15:00 GMT	Wallace 30'; Palmer (yellow card) 33' van Aken (yellow card) 57'	Report	Leadbitter (penalty missed) 71; Howson 71' (yellow card) 90+5'; Shotton 83'	Stadium: Hillsborough; Attendance: 27,471; Referee: Peter Bankes

26 December 2017 24	Middlesbrough	2–0	Bolton Wanderers	Middlesbrough
15:00 GMT	Howson (yellow card) 33'; Braithwaite 49', (yellow card) 57'; Assombalonga 67'	Report	Taylor (yellow card) 12'; Beevers (yellow card) 51'; Wheater (yellow card) 88'	Stadium: Riverside Stadium; Attendance: 29,433; Referee: Jeremy Simpson

30 December 2017 25	Middlesbrough	0–1	Aston Villa	Middlesbrough
15:00 GMT	Leadbitter (yellow card) 15'; Friend (yellow card) 67'; Downing (yellow card) 90+4'	Report	Hourihane (yellow card) 24'; Onomah (yellow card) 30'; Elphick (yellow card) 45+4'; Chester (yellow card) 62'; Snodgrass 75'	Stadium: Riverside Stadium; Attendance: 29,422; Referee: Andy Madley

1 January 2018 26	Preston North End	2–3	Middlesbrough	Preston
15:00 GMT	Robinson 14'; Hugill 40'; Johnson (yellow card) 63'; Harrop (yellow card) 67'	Report	Ayala 13', 73'; Christie (yellow card) 56'; Howson 65'; Friend (yellow card) 72'; Gestede (yellow card) 89'; Randolph (yellow card) 90+2'	Stadium: Deepdale; Attendance: 15,101; Referee: David Coote

13 January 2018 27	Middlesbrough	0–1	Fulham	Middlesbrough
15:00 GMT		Report	Norwood 90+5' (pen.)	Stadium: Riverside Stadium; Attendance: 23,850; Referee: Geoff Eltringham

20 January 2018 28	Queens Park Rangers	0–3	Middlesbrough	Shepherd's Bush, London
15:00 GMT		Report	Ayala 24'; Friend 34'; Traoré 85'	Stadium: Loftus Road; Attendance: 14,182; Referee: Oliver Langford

30 January 2018 29	Middlesbrough	0–0	Sheffield Wednesday	Middlesbrough
19:45 DST		Report	Thorniley (yellow card) 11'; Reach (yellow card) 87'	Stadium: Riverside Stadium; Attendance: 24,120; Referee: James Linington

3 February 2018 30	Norwich City	1–0	Middlesbrough	Norwich
15:00 GMT	Trybull 44' (yellow card) 45+1'; Tettey (yellow card) 90'	Report	Gestede (red card) 28'; Leadbitter (yellow card) 62'	Stadium: Carrow Road; Attendance: 25,960; Referee: Mike Jones

10 February 2018 31	Middlesbrough	2–1	Reading	Middlesbrough
15:00 GMT (UTC)	Traoré 44' 49'; Friend (yellow card) 73'; Clayton (yellow card) 88'	Report	van den Berg (yellow card) 60'; Martin 78'; Gunter (yellow card) 83'; Bacuna (yellow card) 87'	Stadium: Riverside Stadium; Attendance: 23,491; Referee: David Coote

17 February 2018 32	Cardiff City	1–0	Middlesbrough	Cardiff
15:00 GMT	Morrison 33'	Report	Bešić (yellow card) 45'	Stadium: Cardiff City Stadium; Attendance: 18,720; Referee: Darren Bond

20 February 2018 33	Middlesbrough	3–1	Hull City	Middlesbrough
19:45 GMT	Gestede 16', 58', (yellow card) 35'; Bamford 45'	Report	Evandro 41'; Dawson (yellow card) 88'	Stadium: Riverside Stadium; Attendance: 23,111; Referee: Andrew Madley

24 February 2018 34	Sunderland	3–3	Middlesbrough	Sunderland
15:00 GMT	Asoro 11'; Clarke-Salter (red card) 24'; Williams 58'; McManaman 90+6'	Report	Traore (red card) 37'; Bamford 49', 68'; Leadbitter 53' (pen.)	Stadium: Stadium of Light; Attendance: 29,048; Referee: Tim Robinson

2 March 2018 35	Middlesbrough	3–0	Leeds United	Middlesbrough
19:45 GMT	Bamford 31', 36', 68'; Leadbitter (yellow card) 34'	Report	Sáiz (yellow card) 34'; Anita (yellow card) 41'; Cooper (yellow card) 73'	Stadium: Riverside Stadium; Attendance: 27,621; Referee: Darren England

6 March 2018 36	Birmingham City	0–1	Middlesbrough	Birmingham
19:45 GMT	Morrison (yellow card) 82'	Report	Bamford 39'	Stadium: St Andrew's; Attendance: 18,301; Referee: Stephen Martin

10 March 2018 37	Middlesbrough	3–1	Barnsley	Middlesbrough
15:00 GMT	Ayala 1'; Traoré 18'; Bamford 53'	Report	Gardner (yellow card) 5'; Moore 58'	Stadium: Riverside Stadium; Attendance: 24,917; Referee: Andy Davies

17 March 2018 38	Brentford	1–1	Middlesbrough	Brentford
15:00 GMT	Woods (yellow card) 14'; MacLeod 34'; Dalsgaard (yellow card) 53'; Sawyers (yellow card) 87' (yellow-red card) 90+1'; Mepham (yellow card) 90+6'	Report	Traoré 21'; Clayton (yellow card) 29'; Gibson (yellow card) 51'; Bešić (yellow card) 62'; Friend (yellow card) 90'	Stadium: Griffin Park; Attendance: 11,134; Referee: Simon Hooper

30 March 2018 39	Middlesbrough	1–2	Wolverhampton Wanderers	Middlesbrough
17:30 BST	Bamford 90+4'	Report	Costa 32'; Cavaleiro 37'	Stadium: Riverside Stadium; Attendance: 27,658; Referee: Stuart Attwell

2 April 2018 40	Burton Albion	1–1	Middlesbrough	Burton upon Trent
15:00 BST	Sordell 6'	Report	Assombalonga 90'	Stadium: Pirelli Stadium; Attendance: 4468; Referee: David Coote

7 April 2018 41	Middlesbrough	2–0	Nottingham Forest	Middlesbrough
15:00 BST	Ayala 7'; Downing 31'; Shotton (yellow card) 57'	Report	Dowell (yellow card) 13'; Pereira Figueiredo (yellow card) 34'	Stadium: Riverside Stadium; Attendance: 25,812; Referee: David Webb

10 April 2018 42	Sheffield United	2–1	Middlesbrough	Sheffield
	L. Evans 2', 40'; Fleck (yellow card) 35'	Report	Leadbitter (yellow card) 19' (yellow-red card) 25'; Traoré (yellow card) 41'; Ayala 48'; Fábio (yellow card) 71'; Friend (yellow card) 87'	Stadium: Bramall Lane; Attendance: 26,557; Referee: Darren Bond

14 April 2018 43	Middlesbrough	2–1	Bristol City	Middlesbrough
15:00 BST	Bešić (yellow card) 9'; Friend 18', (yellow card) 19'; Clayton (yellow card) 56'; Ayala 68'; Randolph (yellow card) 90'	Report	Djuric 13'; Reid (yellow card) 45'; Pack (yellow card) 77'	Stadium: Riverside Stadium; Attendance: 24,812; Referee: Andy Madley

21 April 2018 44	Derby County	1–2	Middlesbrough	Derby
15:00 BST	Huddlestone (yellow card) 36'; Hanson (yellow card) 84'; Nugent 90+2' (pen.)	Report	Clayton (yellow card) 1'; Bešić 20'; Traoré (yellow card) 32'; Assombalonga 70'	Stadium: Pride Park; Attendance: 28,096; Referee: Lee Probert

28 April 2018 45	Middlesbrough	2–0	Millwall	Middlesbrough
17:30 BST	Assombalonga 11'; Friend (yellow card) 47'; Howson 66'; Bešić (yellow card) 85'	Report	Williams (yellow card) 45'; Hutchinson (yellow card) 87'; Tunnicliffe (yellow card) 90'	Stadium: Riverside Stadium; Attendance: 28,606; Referee: Paul Tierney

6 May 2018 46	Ipswich Town	2–2	Middlesbrough	Ipswich
12:30 BST	Sears 8', (yellow card) 45+2'; Skuse (yellow card) 12'; Nydam (yellow card) 45+1'; Waghorn 83' (pen.)	Report	Downing 71'; Gibson (yellow card) 90+4'; Bamford 90+6'	Stadium: Portman Road; Attendance: 18,829; Referee: David Coote

==== Football League play-offs ====
12 May 2018 Semi final (1st leg)	Middlesbrough	0–1	Aston Villa	Middlesbrough
19:45 BST	Friend (yellow card) 45'; Gibson (yellow card) 49'	Report	Hourihane (yellow card) 13'; Jedinak 15'; Snodgrass (yellow card) 75'	Stadium: Riverside Stadium; Attendance: 29,233; Referee: Bobby Madley

15 May 2018 Semi-final second leg	Aston Villa	0–0 (1–0 agg.)	Middlesbrough	Birmingham
19:45 BST	Snodgrass (yellow card) 34'; Hutton (yellow card) 45'; Grealish (yellow card) 60'; Johnstone (yellow card) 87'	Report	Friend (yellow card) 13'; Bešić (yellow card) 80'	Stadium: Villa Park; Attendance: 40,505; Referee: Mike Dean

=== FA Cup ===
In the FA Cup, Middlesbrough entered the competition in the third round and were drawn at home versus Sunderland. Boro beat the Black Cats 2–0 at the Riverside.

The Monday after Boro were drawn with who ever won that night's game between Brighton and Crystal Palace. The Seagulls (Brighton) won the game 2–1, meaning that Boro will play them in the 4th round, on the Weekend of the 27th of January.

6 January 2018 Third round	Middlesbrough	2–0	Sunderland	Middlesbrough
13:00 GMT	Gestede 10'; Braithwaite 42'	Report		Stadium: Riverside Stadium; Attendance: 26,399; Referee: Christopher Kavanagh

27 January 2018 Fourth round	Middlesbrough	0–1	Brighton & Hove Albion	Middlesbrough
15:00 GMT	Clayton (yellow card) 44'	Report	Baldock (yellow card) 61'; Pröpper (yellow card) 68'; Izquierdo (yellow card) 70'; Murray 90'; Kayal (yellow card) 90+5'	Stadium: Riverside Stadium; Attendance: 20,475; Referee: Anthony Taylor

=== EFL Cup ===
Middlesbrough entered the 2017–18 EFL Cup in the second round, and were drawn at home to Scunthorpe United. An away trip against Aston Villa was confirmed for the third round. A fourth round trip to AFC Bournemouth was announced.

22 August 2017 Second round	Middlesbrough	3–0	Scunthorpe United	Middlesbrough
19:45 BST	Fábio 17'; Baker 30'; Fletcher 55'	Report		Stadium: Riverside Stadium; Attendance: 12,679; Referee: Andy Madley

19 September 2017 Third round	Aston Villa	0–2	Middlesbrough	Aston
19:45 BST	Elphick (yellow card) 17' (yellow-red card) 57'	Report	Bamford 58' (pen.), 67'; Howson (yellow card) 72'	Stadium: Villa Park; Attendance: 11,197; Referee: Stephen Martin

24 October 2017 Fourth round	AFC Bournemouth	3–1	Middlesbrough	Boscombe
19:45 BST	Simpson 49'; Wilson 75' (pen.); Afobe 82'	Report	Fry (yellow card) 39'; Tavernier 56'	Stadium: Dean Court; Referee: Simon Hooper

== Transfers ==
=== Transfers in ===
Date from	Position	Nationality	Name	From	Fee	Ref.
1 July 2017	CF	(England)	Luke Armstrong	Blyth Spartans	Free	
1 July 2017	CB	(England)	Tom Brewitt	Liverpool	Free	
1 July 2017	CB	(Luxembourg)	Enes Mahmutovic	Fola Esch	Undisclosed	
1 July 2017	AM	(England)	Lewis Wing	Shildon	Free	
7 July 2017	RB	(Republic of Ireland)	Cyrus Christie	Derby County	Undisclosed	
7 July 2017	CM	(England)	Jonny Howson	Norwich City	Undisclosed	
13 July 2017	CF	(Denmark)	Martin Braithwaite	Toulouse	undisclosed	
14 July 2017	ST	(England)	George Miller	Bury	Undisclosed	
17 July 2017	CF	(Democratic Republic of the Congo)	Britt Assombalonga	Nottingham Forest	£15,000,000	
22 July 2017	GK	(Republic of Ireland)	Darren Randolph	West Ham United	£5,000,000	
28 July 2017	CF	(England)	Ashley Fletcher	West Ham United	£6,500,000	
29 August 2017	CB	(Poland)	Jakub Sinior	Legia Warsaw	Undisclosed	
29 August 2017	AM	(France)	Amadou Sylla	Stade Reims	Free	
30 August 2017	CB	(England)	Ryan Shotton	Birmingham City	Undisclosed	
31 August 2017	LM	(England)	Marvin Johnson	Oxford United	Undisclosed	
31 January 2018	RB	(England)	Martin Cranie	Huddersfield Town	Undisclosed	

=== Transfers out ===
Date from	Position	Nationality	Name	To	Fee	Ref.
1 July 2017	FW	(Scotland)	Jordan Rhodes	Sheffield Wednesday	Undisclosed	
1 July 2017	RB	(England)	Nathan Convery	Free agent	Released	
1 July 2017	CF	(England)	Bradley Fewster	Free agent	Released	
1 July 2017	LW	(Denmark)	Viktor Fischer	Mainz 05	Undisclosed	
1 July 2017	GK	(United States)	Brad Guzan	Atlanta United	Undisclosed	
1 July 2017	CM	(England)	Brandon Holdsworth	Free agent	Released	
1 July 2017	CM	(Northern Ireland)	Lewis Maloney	Free agent	Released	
1 July 2017	CB	(England)	Niall McGoldrick	Whitby Town	Released	(Note: Niall McGoldrick joined Whitby Town following his release.)
1 July 2017	LW	(England)	Junior Mondal	Free agent	Released	
1 July 2017	GK	(Spain)	Víctor Valdés	Retired	Released	
1 July 2017	CM	(England)	Josef Wheatley	Free agent	Released	
1 July 2017	MF	(England)	Matthew Wilson	Free agent	Released	
7 July 2017	CB	(Colombia)	Bernardo Espinosa	Girona	Undisclosed	
11 July 2017	LB	(England)	James Husband	Norwich City	Undisclosed	
19 July 2017	LW	(Uruguay)	Carlos de Pena	Free agent	Released	
21 July 2017	RW	(Uruguay)	Cristhian Stuani	Girona	Undisclosed	
4 August 2017	AM	(Uruguay)	Gastón Ramírez	Sampdoria	Undisclosed	
7 August 2017	CB	(England)	Alex Baptiste	Queen's Park Rangers	Released	
10 August 2017	CM	(Netherlands)	Marten de Roon	Atalanta	Undisclosed	
18 January 2018	CM	(England)	Adam Forshaw	Leeds United	£4,500,000	
31 January 2018	RB	(Republic of Ireland)	Cyrus Christie	Fulham	Undisclosed	
31 January 2018	CM	(Algeria)	Adlène Guedioura	Nottingham Forest	Free	

=== Loans in ===
Start date	Position	Nationality	Name	From	End date	Ref.
14 July 2017	RB	(Wales)	Connor Roberts	Swansea City	30 June 2018	
11 August 2017	CM	(England)	Lewis Baker	Chelsea	30 June 2018	
30 January 2018	RW	(England)	Jack Harrison	Manchester City	30 June 2018	
31 January 2018	DM	(Bosnia and Herzegovina)	Muhamed Bešić	Everton	30 June 2018	

=== Loans out ===
Start date	Position	Nationality	Name	To	End date	Ref.
1 July 2017	GK	(England)	Joe Fryer	Stevenage	30 June 2018	
1 July 2017	DM	(Belgium)	Julien De Sart	Zulte Waregem	30 June 2018	
3 July 2017	DM	(England)	Robbie Tinkler	Gateshead	January 2018	
6 July 2017	RB	(Spain)	Antonio Barragán	Real Betis	30 June 2018	
7 July 2017	CB	(England)	Matthew Elsdon	Inverness Caledonian Thistle	30 June 2018	
18 July 2017	AM	(England)	Callum Cooke	Blackpool	30 June 2018	
4 August 2017	RW	(England)	Harry Chapman	Blackburn Rovers	30 June 2018	
7 August 2017	GK	(England)	Connor Ripley	Burton Albion	4 January 2018 (Note: Ripley's loan spell was terminated early)	
31 August 2017	RB	(England)	Callum Johnson	Accrington Stanley	January 2018	
5 December 2017	CF	(England)	George Miller	Wrexham	5 January 2018	
12 December 2017	CM	(England)	Alexander Pattison	York City	12 January 2018	
4 January 2018	GK	(England)	Connor Ripley	Bury	30 June 2018	
17 January 2018	LW	(England)	Marcus Tavernier	Milton Keynes Dons	30 June 2018	
19 January 2018	CF	(England)	George Miller	Bury	30 June 2018	
31 January 2018	CF	(Denmark)	Martin Braithwaite	Girondins de Bordeaux	30 June 2018	
31 January 2018	CF	(England)	Ashley Fletcher	Sunderland	30 June 2018	

== Statistics ==
=== Appearances ===
No.	Pos.	Name	Championship			FA Cup			EFL Cup			Total			Discipline	
No.	Pos.	Name	Apps	Goals	Assists	Apps	Goals	Assists	Apps	Goals	Assists	Apps	Goals	Assists	Yellow card	Red card
1	GK	(Greece) Dimitrios Konstantopoulos	0	0	0	0	0	0	3	0	0	3	0	0	0	0
2	DF	(Brazil) Fábio	18 (3)	1	1	0	0	0	1	1	0	19 (3)	2	1	2	0
3	DF	(England) George Friend	27 (4)	2	1	2	0	0	2	0	0	31 (4)	2	1	9	0
4	DF	(Spain) Daniel Ayala	31	7	1	2	0	0	3	0	0	36	7	1	2	1
5	DF	(England) Ryan Shotton	21 (1)	1	2	2	0	0	0	0	0	23 (1)	1	2	2	0
6	DF	(England) Ben Gibson	43	1	3	2	0	0	1	0	0	46	1	2	5	0
7	MF	(England) Grant Leadbitter	29 (3)	3	1	1	0	0	1	0	1	27 (3)	3	2	11	1
8	MF	(England) Adam Clayton	20 (10)	0	0	1 (1)	0	0	1	0	0	22 (11)	0	0	11	0
9	FW	(Democratic Republic of the Congo) Britt Assombalonga	30 (12)	15	0	0 (1)	0	0	0	0	0	30 (13)	15	0	3	0
11	FW	(England) Patrick Bamford	23 (14)	11	0	1	0	0	2	2	0	26 (14)	13	0	1	0
13	GK	(Spain) Tomás Mejías	0	0	0	0	0	0	0	0	0	0	0	0	0	0
14	DF	(England) Martin Cranie	1 (8)	0	0	0	0	0	0	0	0	1 (8)	0	0	1	0
16	MF	(England) Jonny Howson	35 (6)	3	2	2	0	0	1	0	0	38 (6)	3	2	7	0
19	MF	(England) Stewart Downing	36 (2)	3	7	1 (1)	0	0	0 (3)	0	0	37 (6)	3	7	1	0
20	DF	(England) Dael Fry	11 (2)	0	1	0 (1)	0	0	2 (1)	0	0	13 (4)	0	1	2	0
21	MF	(England) Marvin Johnson	6 (11)	1	2	0 (1)	0	0	0	0	0	6 (12)	1	2	0	0
23	DF	(England) Jack Harrison	0 (3)	0	0	0	0	0	0	0	0	0 (3)	0	0	0	0
25	GK	(Republic of Ireland) Darren Randolph	44	0	0	2	0	0	0	0	0	46	0	0	3	0
27	MF	(Bosnia and Herzegovina) Muhamed Bešić	13	1	1	0	0	0	0	0	0	13	1	1	3	0
30	MF	(England) Lewis Baker	6 (6)	1	0	0	0	0	2	1	0	8 (6)	2	0	1	0
37	FW	(Spain) Adama Traoré	24 (8)	5	10	2	0	1	2	0	2	28 (8)	5	12	3	2
39	FW	(Benin) Rudy Gestede	10 (9)	3	2	1	1	0	0 (1)	0	0	11 (10)	2	1	3	1
45	FW	(England) George Miller	0	0	0	0	0	0	0 (1)	0	0	0 (1)	0	0	0	0
Players who left the club in August/January transfer window or on loan
10	FW	(Denmark) Martin Braithwaite	17 (2)	5	2	2	1	0	0	0	0	19 (2)	6	2	3	0
12	GK	(England) Connor Ripley	0	0	0	0	0	0	0	0	0	0	0	0	0	0
14	MF	(Netherlands) Marten de Roon	1	0	0	0	0	0	0	0	0	1	0	0	0	0
15	DF	(England) Alex Baptiste	0	0	0	0	0	0	0	0	0	0	0	0	0	0
17	DF	(Spain) Antonio Barragán	0	0	0	0	0	0	0	0	0	0	0	0	0	0
17	MF	(Algeria) Adlène Guedioura	1	0	0	0	0	0	0	0	0	1	0	0	0	0
18	FW	(England) Ashley Fletcher	3 (13)	1	1	1	0	0	2 (1)	1	0	6 (14)	2	1	0	0
22	DF	(Republic of Ireland) Cyrus Christie	24 (1)	1	4	0 (1)	0	0	0	0	0	24 (2)	1	4	7	0
23	MF	(Belgium) Julien De Sart	0	0	0	0	0	0	0	0	0	0	0	0	0	0
23	DF	(Wales) Connor Roberts	1	0	0	0	0	0	2	0	0	3	0	0	0	0
34	MF	(England) Adam Forshaw	5 (6)	0	0	0	0	0	3	0	0	8 (6)	0	0	1	0
51	MF	(England) Lewis Wing	0	0	0	0	0	0	1 (1)	0	0	1 (1)	0	0	0	0
62	MF	(England) Marcus Tavernier	4 (1)	1	0	0	0	0	3	1	2	7 (1)	2	2	0	0

=== Top scorers ===
The list is sorted by shirt number when total goals are equal.

RK	Pos	No.	Player	Championship	FA Cup	League Cup	Total
1	FW	9	(Democratic Republic of the Congo) Britt Assombalonga	14	0	0	14
2	FW	11	(England) Patrick Bamford	10	0	2	12
3	DF	4	(Spain) Daniel Ayala	7	0	0	7
4	FW	10	(Denmark) Martin Braithwaite	5	1	0	6
5	FW	37	(Spain) Adama Traoré	5	0	0	5
6	FW	39	(Benin) Rudy Gestede	3	1	0	4
7	MF	7	(England) Grant Leadbitter	3	0	0	3
8	DF	3	(England) George Friend	2	0	0	2
8	MF	16	(England) Jonny Howson	2	0	0	2
8	MF	19	(England) Stewart Downing	2	0	0	2
8	DF	2	(Brazil) Fábio	1	0	1	2
8	FW	18	(England) Ashley Fletcher	1	0	1	2
8	MF	30	(England) Lewis Baker	1	0	1	2
8	MF	62	(England) Marcus Tavernier	1	0	1	2
15	DF	5	(England) Ryan Shotton	1	0	0	1
15	DF	6	(England) Ben Gibson	1	0	0	1
15	MF	21	(England) Marvin Johnson	1	0	0	1
15	DF	22	(England) Cyrus Christie	1	0	0	1
15	MF	27	(Bosnia and Herzegovina) Muhamed Bešić	1	0	0	1
Own Goal				1	0	0	1
Total				63	2	6	71
