= 2024–25 FK Spartak Subotica season =

FK Spartak Subotica
2024–25 season
- Manager: Miloš Kruščić
- Stadium: Subotica City Stadium
- Serbian SuperLiga: Pre-season
- Serbian Cup: Pre-season

The 2024–25 season is the 80th season in the history of FK Spartak Subotica, and the club's 16th consecutive season in Serbian SuperLiga. In addition to the domestic league, the team is scheduled to participate in the Serbian Cup.

== Squad ==
As of 20 July 2024

Note: Flags indicate national team as defined under FIFA eligibility rules; some limited exceptions apply. Players may hold more than one non-FIFA nationality.

No.	Pos.	Nation	Player
1	GK	SRB	Aleksandar Vulić
3	DF	SRB	Vladimir Vitorović
4	DF	SRB	Mihailo Bogićević
5	DF	SRB	Dejan Kerkez (captain)
6	MF	NGR	Francis Ebuka Nwokeabia
7	MF	SRB	Veljko Jocić
9	FW	COL	José Mulato
10	FW	SRB	Luka Bijelović
12	GK	SRB	Marin Dulić
14	FW	SRB	Vojo Ubiparip
15	DF	SRB	Nemanja Ćalasan
16	DF	SRB	Danijel Kolarić
17	MF	GHA	Kwaku Bonsu Osei
18	DF	SRB	David Dunđerski
19	FW	NGR	Collins Atule

No.	Pos.	Nation	Player
20	MF	SRB	Miloš Mijić
21	MF	SRB	Ilija Babić
22	MF	SRB	Jovan Lukić
23	GK	SRB	Dimitrije Minić
24	DF	SRB	Marko Kerkez
26	DF	SRB	Vladimir Prijović
28	MF	SRB	Milan Desnica
30	DF	SRB	Luka Peić
44	DF	SRB	Marko Mijailović
49	DF	SRB	Nemanja Krsmanović
70	FW	SRB	Stefan Simin
77	DF	SRB	Nikola Puskar
80	MF	GHA	Lucius Chimeremeze Onwuboro
88	MF	SRB	Stefan Tomović
99	DF	MNE	Ilija Martinović

=== Out on loan ===
Note: Flags indicate national team as defined under FIFA eligibility rules; some limited exceptions apply. Players may hold more than one non-FIFA nationality.

No.	Pos.	Nation	Player
—	DF	SRB	Ilija Miodragović (at Radnički Sremska Mitrovica)
—	DF	SRB	Simo Vrbljanac (at Rad Zrenjanin)
—	DF	TAN	Alphonce Msanga (at Novi Sad)
—	MF	TAN	Morice Abraham (at Novi Sad)

No.	Pos.	Nation	Player
—	MF	SRB	Miloš Opačić (at Radnički Pirot)
—	FW	SRB	Lazar Stajković (at Radnički Sremska Mitrovica)
—	FW	SRB	Uroš Čejić (at OFK Vršac)

== Friendlies ==
=== Pre-season ===
22 June 2024 Friendly	Spartak Subotica (Serbia)	2–4	(Serbia) Tekstilac Odžaci
10:30 UTC+2

22 June 2024 Friendly	Vojvodina (Serbia)	3–0	(Serbia) Spartak Subotica
18:00 UTC+2

26 June 2024 Friendly	Spartak Subotica (Serbia)	2–0	(Montenegro) Dečić
18:00 UTC+2

30 June 2024 Friendly	Spartak Subotica (Serbia)	1–2	(Cyprus) APOEL	Užice
18:00	Todoroski 74' (pen.)		Kostadinov 19'; Ben Nabouhane 40' (pen.)	Stadium: Stadion Radomir Antić

5 July 2024 Friendly	Spartak Subotica (Serbia)	2–0	(Serbia) Sloboda Užice
16:30 UTC+2

6 July 2024 Friendly	Spartak Subotica (Serbia)	0–0	(Montenegro) Arsenal Tivat
16:30 UTC+2

== Competitions ==
=== Overall record ===
Competition	First match	Last match	Starting round	Record							
Competition	First match	Last match	Starting round	Pld	W	D	L	GF	GA	GD	Win %
Serbian SuperLiga	21 July 2024		Matchday 1	1	0	0	1	2	3	−1	0.00
Serbian Cup				0	0	0	0	0	0	+0	—
Total				1	0	0	1	2	3	−1	0.00

Last updated: 21 July 2024
Source: Soccerway

=== Serbian SuperLiga ===
==== Results summary ====
Overall								Home						Away					
Pld	W	D	L	GF	GA	GD	Pts	W	D	L	GF	GA	GD	W	D	L	GF	GA	GD
1	0	0	1	2	3	−1	0	0	0	0	0	0	0	0	0	1	2	3	−1

Last updated: 21 July 2024.

==== Results by round ====
Round	1
Ground	A
Result	L
Position	

Updated to match(es) played on 21 July 2024. Source:
A = Away; H = Home; W = Win; D = Draw; L = Loss

==== Matches ====
The match schedule was released on 10 June 2024.

21 July 2024 1	Novi Pazar	3–2	Spartak Subotica	Novi Pazar
17:30 UTC+2	Adeshina 23'; Lakićević (yellow card) 25'; Ljajić 31', 78'; Bjeličić (yellow card) 50'; Alić (yellow card) 64'; Bačkulja (yellow card) 74'		Bogićević (yellow card) 30'; Todoroski (yellow card) 39'; Ubiparip 83'; Atule 90+2'	Stadium: Novi Pazar City Stadium; Referee: Milan Stefanović
