= 2013–14 Ferencvárosi TC season =

Ferencvárosi TC
2013–14 season
- Chairman: Gábor Kubatov
- Manager: Ricardo Moniz (until 1 December 2013); Thomas Doll
- NB 1: 3rd
- Hungarian Cup: Round of 16
- Hungarian League Cup: Semi-final
- Top goalscorer: League: Dániel Böde (11); All: Dániel Böde (17)
- Highest home attendance: 22,094 vs Újpest (22 September 2013)
- Lowest home attendance: 400 vs Sopron (4 September 2013)
Home colours	Away colours	Third colours

The 2013–14 season will be Ferencvárosi TC's 111th competitive season, 5th consecutive season in the OTP Bank Liga and 114th year in existence as a football club.

== First team squad ==
Note: Flags indicate national team as defined under FIFA eligibility rules; some limited exceptions apply. Players may hold more than one non-FIFA nationality.

No.	Pos.	Nation	Player
4	DF	HUN	Sándor Hidvégi
5	DF	GER	Philipp Bönig
7	MF	BIH	Aleksandar Jovanović
8	MF	HUN	György Józsi
10	MF	ROU	Andrei Ionescu
13	FW	HUN	Dániel Böde
17	FW	MLI	Ulysse Diallo
19	DF	HUN	Gábor Gyömbér
21	DF	BIH	Muhamed Bešić
22	MF	HUN	Attila Busai
25	MF	HUN	Ákos Buzsáky

No.	Pos.	Nation	Player
27	MF	NED	Julian Jenner
30	MF	SRB	Vladan Čukić
33	MF	HUN	Dávid Holman
39	DF	CRO	Mateo Pavlović (loan from Werder Bremen)
44	DF	ESP	David Mateos
55	GK	HUN	Levente Jova
70	FW	HUN	Roland Ugrai
86	DF	HUN	Zsolt Laczkó
88	FW	BRA	Somália
90	DF	HUN	Dénes Dibusz
99	MF	BRA	Leonardo

== Transfers ==
=== Summer ===
In: Note: Flags indicate national team as defined under FIFA eligibility rules; some limited exceptions apply. Players may hold more than one non-FIFA nationality.

No.	Pos.	Nation	Player
1	GK	HUN	Péter Kurucz (from Siófok)
4	DF	HUN	Sándor Hidvégi (from MTK)
11	MF	NED	Arsenio Valpoort (from (Netherlands) Heerenveen)
11	FW	HUN	János Máté (loan return from Siófok)
14	FW	NED	Jack Tuyp (from (Netherlands) Volendam)
17	MF	HUN	Dominik Nagy (from Pécs)
17	FW	MLI	Ulysse Diallo (from (Lebanon) Al-Sahel)
20	FW	HUN	Pantelis Popgeorgiev (from Ferencváros II)
21	MF	HUN	Norbert Zsivóczky (loan return from Szigetszentmiklós)
22	MF	HUN	Attila Busai (loan return from Szolnok)
25	MF	HUN	Ákos Buzsáky (from (England) Portsmouth)
26	DF	HUN	Tamás Grúz (loan return from Szolnok)
35	DF	BRA	Gerson (loan from (Austria) Kapfenberg)
37	DF	HUN	János Birtalan (from Ferencváros II)
44	DF	ESP	David Mateos (from (Spain) Real Madrid B)
52	DF	TRI	Akeem Adams (from (Trinidad and Tobago) Central)
72	GK	HUN	Gábor Rigó (from Ferencváros II)

Out: Note: Flags indicate national team as defined under FIFA eligibility rules; some limited exceptions apply. Players may hold more than one non-FIFA nationality.

No.	Pos.	Nation	Player
1	GK	SVN	Marko Ranilović (to Kaposvár)
4	DF	HUN	Dániel Sváb (to (Germany) Cottbus)
10	FW	SRB	Milan Perić (loan return to Videoton)
11	FW	HUN	János Máté (to Szolnok)
11	MF	BEL	Stanley Aborah
17	MF	HUN	Bence Batik (loan to MTK)
18	MF	HUN	András Gárdos (to Siófok)
21	MF	HUN	Norbert Zsivóczky (to Szigetszentmiklós)
23	DF	BRA	Júnior Fell
26	DF	HUN	Tamás Grúz (loan to Szolnok)
39	MF	HUN	Márk Orosz (loan to Pápa)
44	DF	CZE	Martin Klein
66	MF	SRB	Aleksandar Alempijević (to (Serbia) Javor)
77	MF	FIN	Juha Hakola (to (Finland) Kuopion)
91	FW	NED	Quenten Martinus (to (Netherlands) Emmen)

=== Winter ===
In: Note: Flags indicate national team as defined under FIFA eligibility rules; some limited exceptions apply. Players may hold more than one non-FIFA nationality.

No.	Pos.	Nation	Player
26	DF	HUN	Tamás Grúz (loan return from Szolnok)
37	FW	HUN	Péter Antal (from Ferencváros U-19)
39	DF	CRO	Mateo Pavlović (loan from (Germany) Werder Bremen)
70	FW	HUN	Roland Ugrai (from Szombathely)
86	DF	HUN	Zsolt Laczkó (from (Italy) Sampdoria)
90	GK	HUN	Dénes Dibusz (from Pécs)

Out: Note: Flags indicate national team as defined under FIFA eligibility rules; some limited exceptions apply. Players may hold more than one non-FIFA nationality.

No.	Pos.	Nation	Player
3	DF	NED	Mark Otten (to Ferencváros II)
11	FW	NED	Arsenio Valpoort (to Ferencváros II)
14	FW	NED	Jack Tuyp (to Ferencváros II)
26	DF	HUN	Tamás Grúz (to Vasas)
35	DF	BRA	Gerson (loan return to (Austria) Kapfenberg)

- List of Hungarian football transfers summer 2013
- List of Hungarian football transfers winter 2013–14

== Statistics ==
=== Appearances and goals ===
Last updated on 1 June 2014.

No.	Pos	Nat	Player	Total		OTP Bank Liga		Hungarian Cup		League Cup	
No.	Pos	Nat	Player	Apps	Goals	Apps	Goals	Apps	Goals	Apps	Goals
4	DF	(Hungary) HUN	Sándor Hidvégi	6	0	3	0	0	0	3	0
5	DF	(Germany) GER	Philipp Bönig	32	3	24	2	1	1	7	0
7	MF	(Bosnia and Herzegovina) BIH	Aleksandar Jovanović	33	0	20	0	2	0	11	0
8	MF	(Hungary) HUN	György Józsi	25	3	18	1	2	2	5	0
10	MF	(Romania) ROU	Andrei Ionescu	16	1	6	0	2	0	8	1
13	FW	(Hungary) HUN	Dániel Böde	37	17	29	11	3	3	5	3
17	FW	(Mali) MLI	Ulysse Diallo	28	10	18	4	2	0	8	6
19	DF	(Hungary) HUN	Gábor Gyömbér	40	5	29	3	3	0	8	2
21	DF	(Bosnia and Herzegovina) BIH	Muhamed Bešić	33	0	25	0	2	0	6	0
22	MF	(Hungary) HUN	Attila Busai	31	6	18	3	3	2	10	1
25	MF	(Hungary) HUN	Ákos Buzsáky	5	0	4	0	0	0	1	0
27	MF	(Netherlands) NED	Julian Jenner	37	7	25	4	3	0	9	3
30	MF	(Serbia) SRB	Vladan Čukić	35	0	23	0	3	0	9	0
33	MF	(Hungary) HUN	Dávid Holman	28	5	22	3	1	0	5	2
39	DF	(Croatia) CRO	Mateo Pavlović	14	1	9	1	0	0	5	0
44	DF	(Spain) ESP	David Mateos	33	4	21	2	2	0	10	2
55	GK	(Hungary) HUN	Levente Jova	23	-29	17	-26	3	-1	3	-2
70	FW	(Hungary) HUN	Roland Ugrai	11	3	8	0	0	0	3	3
86	DF	(Hungary) HUN	Zsolt Laczkó	6	0	4	0	0	0	2	0
88	FW	(Brazil) BRA	Somália	34	5	23	4	3	1	8	0
90	GK	(Hungary) HUN	Dénes Dibusz	16	-8	13	-7	0	0	3	-1
99	MF	(Brazil) BRA	Leonardo Santiago	20	5	14	5	1	0	5	0
Youth players:
1	GK	(Hungary) HUN	Péter Kurucz	2	-2	0	0	0	0	2	-2
16	MF	(Hungary) HUN	Tamás Csilus	2	0	0	0	0	0	2	0
23	MF	(Hungary) HUN	Dominik Nagy	1	0	0	0	0	0	1	0
24	FW	(Hungary) HUN	Krisztián Kovács	2	0	0	0	0	0	2	0
31	DF	(Hungary) HUN	Dávid Valencsik	1	0	0	0	0	0	1	0
32	MF	(Hungary) HUN	Péter Zsivoczky	1	0	0	0	0	0	1	0
35	DF	(Hungary) HUN	András Gyurácz	2	0	0	0	0	0	2	0
37	MF	(Hungary) HUN	Antal Péter	3	1	0	0	0	0	3	1
41	GK	(Hungary) HUN	Roland Kunsági	4	-6	0	0	0	0	4	-6
Players no longer at the club:
3	DF	(Netherlands) NED	Mark Otten	2	0	2	0	0	0	0	0
11	FW	(Netherlands) NED	Arsenio Valpoort	15	2	10	1	1	1	4	0
14	FW	(Netherlands) NED	Jack Tuyp	8	1	7	1	0	0	1	0
35	DF	(Brazil) BRA	Gerson	18	0	11	0	3	0	4	0
52	DF	(Trinidad and Tobago) TRI	Akeem Adams	8	0	6	0	0	0	2	0
66	MF	(Serbia) SRB	Aleksandar Alempijević	2	0	2	0	0	0	0	0

=== Top scorers ===
Includes all competitive matches. The list is sorted by shirt number when total goals are equal.

Last updated on 1 June 2014

Position	Nation	Number	Name	OTP Bank Liga	Hungarian Cup	League Cup	Total
1	(Hungary)	13	Dániel Böde	11	3	3	17
2	(Mali)	17	Ulysse Diallo	4	0	6	10
3	(Netherlands)	27	Julian Jenner	4	0	3	7
4	(Hungary)	22	Attila Busai	3	2	1	6
5	(Brazil)	99	Leonardo	5	0	0	5
6	(Brazil)	88	Somália	4	1	0	5
7	(Hungary)	33	Dávid Holman	3	0	2	5
8	(Hungary)	19	Gábor Gyömbér	3	0	2	5
9	(Spain)	44	David Mateos	2	0	2	4
10	(Germany)	5	Philipp Bönig	2	1	0	3
11	(Hungary)	8	György Józsi	1	2	0	3
12	(Hungary)	70	Roland Ugrai	0	0	3	3
13	(Netherlands)	11	Arsenio Valpoort	1	1	0	2
14	(Netherlands)	14	Jack Tuyp	1	0	0	1
15	(Croatia)	39	Mateo Pavlović	1	0	0	1
16	(Romania)	10	Andrei Ionescu	0	0	1	1
17	(Hungary)	37	Antal Péter	0	0	1	1
/	/	/	Own Goals	2	0	0	2
			TOTALS	47	10	24	81

=== Disciplinary record ===
Includes all competitive matches. Players with 1 card or more included only.

Last updated on 1 June 2014

Position	Nation	Number	Name	OTP Bank Liga		Hungarian Cup		League Cup		Total (Hu Total)	
Position	Nation	Number	Name	Booked	Sent off (straight red)	Booked	Sent off (straight red)	Booked	Sent off (straight red)	Booked	Sent off (straight red)
DF	(Hungary)	4	Sándor Hidvégi	0	0	0	0	1	0	1 (0)	0 (0)
DF	(Germany)	5	Philipp Bönig	1	0	0	0	1	0	2 (1)	0 (0)
MF	(Bosnia and Herzegovina)	7	Aleksandar Jovanović	7	0	1	0	1	0	9 (7)	0 (0)
MF	(Hungary)	8	György Józsi	0	0	0	0	1	0	1 (0)	0 (0)
MF	(Romania)	10	Andrei Ionescu	0	0	0	0	1	0	1 (0)	0 (0)
FW	(Netherlands)	11	Arsenio Valpoort	1	0	0	0	1	0	2 (1)	0 (0)
FW	(Hungary)	13	Dániel Böde	5	0	1	0	0	0	6 (5)	0 (0)
FW	(Mali)	17	Ulysse Diallo	2	0	0	0	1	0	3 (2)	0 (0)
DF	(Hungary)	19	Gábor Gyömbér	5	0	0	0	0	0	5 (5)	0 (0)
DF	(Bosnia and Herzegovina)	21	Muhamed Bešić	11	1	0	1	2	0	13 (11)	2 (1)
MF	(Hungary)	22	Attila Busai	4	2	1	0	1	0	6 (4)	2 (2)
MF	(Hungary)	23	Dominik Nagy	0	0	0	0	1	0	1 (0)	0 (0)
MF	(Netherlands)	27	Julian Jenner	6	1	0	0	1	0	7 (6)	1 (1)
MF	(Serbia)	30	Vladan Čukić	10	0	0	0	3	0	13 (10)	0 (0)
DF	(Hungary)	31	Dávid Valencsik	0	0	0	0	0	1	0 (0)	1 (0)
MF	(Hungary)	33	Dávid Holman	6	0	0	0	1	0	7 (6)	0 (0)
DF	(Brazil)	35	Gerson	2	0	2	0	1	0	5 (2)	0 (0)
DF	(Hungary)	35	András Gyurácz	0	0	0	0	0	1	0 (0)	1 (0)
DF	(Croatia)	39	Mateo Pavlović	2	2	0	0	1	0	3 (2)	2 (2)
DF	(Spain)	44	David Mateos	5	0	1	0	4	0	10 (5)	0 (0)
DF	(Trinidad and Tobago)	52	Akeem Adams	4	0	0	0	0	0	4 (4)	0 (0)
GK	(Hungary)	55	Levente Jova	2	0	0	0	0	0	2 (2)	0 (0)
MF	(Serbia)	66	Aleksandar Alempijević	1	1	0	0	0	0	1 (1)	1 (1)
FW	(Hungary)	70	Roland Ugrai	1	0	0	0	1	0	2 (1)	0 (0)
DF	(Hungary)	86	Zsolt Laczkó	0	0	0	0	2	0	2 (0)	0 (0)
FW	(Brazil)	88	Somália	2	0	0	0	0	0	2 (2)	0 (0)
MF	(Brazil)	99	Leonardo	3	0	0	0	0	0	3 (3)	0 (0)
			TOTALS	84	7	2	1	25	2	111 (84)	10 (7)

=== Overall ===
Games played	45 (30 OTP Bank Liga, 3 Hungarian Cup and 12 Hungarian League Cup)
Games won	26 (17 OTP Bank Liga, 1 Hungarian Cup and 8 Hungarian League Cup)
Games drawn	9 (6 OTP Bank Liga, 1 Hungarian Cup and 2 Hungarian League Cup)
Games lost	10 (7 OTP Bank Liga, 1 Hungarian Cup and 2 Hungarian League Cup)
Goals scored	81
Goals conceded	45
Goal difference	+36
Yellow cards	111
Red cards	10
Worst discipline	(Bosnia and Herzegovina) Muhamed Bešić (13 (yellow card) , 2 (red card) )
Best result	10–0 (A) v Szekszárd – Magyar Kupa – 29-10-2013
Worst result	1–4 (A) v Debrecen – OTP Bank Liga – 25-08-2013
Worst result	1–4 (A) v Győr – Ligakupa – 16-10-2013
Worst result	0–3 (H) v Szombathely – OTP Bank Liga – 10-11-2013
Most appearances	(Hungary) Gábor Gyömbér (40 appearances)
Top scorer	(Hungary) Dániel Böde (17 goals)
Points	87/135 (64.44%)

Last updated: 1 June 2014

== Nemzeti Bajnokság I ==
=== Matches ===
27 July 2013 1	Pécs	1–2	Ferencváros	Pécs, Baranya County
19:00 CEST	Koller 59'	(Report)	Tuyp 28'; Valpoort 77'	Stadium: Stadion PMFC; Attendance: 5,500; Referee: (Hungary) Zsolt Szabó

4 August 2013 2	Ferencváros	0–2	Videoton	Budapest, Pest County
16:30 CEST		(Report)	Nikolić 7', 76' (pen.)	Stadium: Ferenc Puskás Stadium; Attendance: 12,400; Referee: (Hungary) Viktor Kassai

10 August 2013 3	Győr	1–2	Ferencváros	Győr, Győr-Moson-Sopron County
21:00 CEST	Varga 47'	(Report)	Holman 58'; Jenner 88'	Stadium: ETO Park; Attendance: 7,000; Referee: (Hungary) Sándor Andó-Szabó

17 August 2013 4	Ferencváros	2–0	MTK	Budapest, Pest County
21:00 CEST	Józsi 24' (pen.); Holman 56'	(Report)		Stadium: Ferenc Puskás Stadium; Attendance: 8,490; Referee: (Hungary) Ádám Farkas

25 August 2013 5	Debrecen	4–1	Ferencváros	Debrecen, Hajdú-Bihar County
16:30 CEST	Bódi 9'; Volaš 48', 61' (pen.); Szakály 90+3'	(Report)	Böde 36'	Stadium: Stadion Oláh Gábor Út; Attendance: 9,000; Referee: (Hungary) Ádám Farkas

31 August 2013 6	Ferencváros	1–0	Kecskemét	Budapest, Pest County
19:00 CEST	Diallo 3'	(Report)		Stadium: Ferenc Puskás Stadium; Attendance: 6,210; Referee: (Hungary) Sándor Andó-Szabó

14 September 2013 7	Pápa	0–2	Ferencváros	Pápa, Veszprém County
20:00 CEST		(Report)	Böde 2'; Holman 46'	Stadium: Stadion Várkerti; Attendance: 4,000; Referee: (Hungary) Viktor Kassai

22 September 2013 8	Ferencváros	3–1	Újpest	Budapest, Pest County
16:30 CEST	Diallo 25'; Juanan 47' (o.g.); Böde 77'	(Report)	Tshibuabua 4'	Stadium: Ferenc Puskás Stadium; Attendance: 22,094; Referee: (Hungary) Zsolt Szabó

28 September 2013 9	Puskás	3–1	Ferencváros	Székesfehérvár, Fejér County
16:00 CEST	Czvitkovics 16'; Lencse 58', 76'	(Report)	Vaszicsku 78' (o.g.)	Stadium: Sóstói Stadion; Attendance: 2,300; Referee: (Hungary) Ádám Németh

6 October 2013 10	Ferencváros	1–2	Honvéd	Budapest, Pest County
16:30 CEST	Gyömbér 11'	(Report)	Alcibiade 37'; Daud 53'	Stadium: Ferenc Puskás Stadium; Attendance: 7,433; Referee: (Hungary) Sándor Andó-Szabó

20 October 2013 11	Kaposvár	1–1	Ferencváros	Kaposvár, Somogy County
18:30 CEST	Mărkuş 57'	(Report)	Böde 89'	Stadium: Stadion Kaposvár Rákóczi; Attendance: 3,000; Referee: (Hungary) József Erdős

26 October 2013 12	Ferencváros	1–1	Mezőkövesd	Budapest, Pest County
16:00 CEST	Diallo 68'	(Report)	Szalai 41'	Stadium: Ferenc Puskás Stadium; Attendance: 5,687; Referee: (Hungary) Péter Solymosi

2 November 2013 13	Diósgyőr	1–4	Ferencváros	Miskolc, Borsod-Abaúj-Zemplén County
14:00 CET	Futács 1'	(Report)	Jenner 14'; Böde 46', 86'; Gyömbér 52'	Stadium: DVTK Stadion; Attendance: 9,271; Referee: (Hungary) Sándor Andó-Szabó

10 November 2013 14	Ferencváros	0–3	Szombathely	Budapest, Pest County
16:30 CET		(Report)	Halmosi 10', 65'; Ugrai 22'	Stadium: Ferenc Puskás Stadium; Attendance: 6,758; Referee: (Hungary) Mihály Fábián

24 November 2013 15	Paks	2–2	Ferencváros	Paks, Tolna County
18:30 CET	Bartha 60'; Simon 64'	(Report)	Böde 43'; Jenner 65'	Stadium: Stadion PSE; Attendance: 3,500; Referee: (Hungary) Tamás Bognár

30 November 2013 16	Ferencváros	1–2	Pécs	Budapest, Pest County
20:00 CET	Böde 6'	(Report)	Mateos 13' (o.g.); Koller 39' (pen.)	Stadium: Ferenc Puskás Stadium; Attendance: 3,423; Referee: (Hungary) Ádám Farkas

8 December 2013 17	Videoton	2–3	Ferencváros	Székesfehérvár, Fejér County
16:30 CET	Gomes 26'; Nikolić 76'	(Report)	Busai 13'; Böde 59'; Jenner 63'	Stadium: Sóstói Stadion; Attendance: 4,391; Referee: (Hungary) Sándor Andó-Szabó

2 March 2014 18	Ferencváros	1–1	Győr	Budapest, Pest County
16:30 CET	Leonardo 74'	(Report)	Varga 87'	Stadium: Ferenc Puskás Stadium; Attendance: 11,228; Referee: (Hungary) Péter Solymosi

8 March 2014 19	MTK	3–2	Ferencváros	Budapest, Pest County
16:00 CET	Pölöskei 1'; Kanta 60'; Torghelle 65'	(Report)	Somália 18', 76'	Stadium: Hidegkuti Nándor Stadium; Attendance: 5,000; Referee: (Hungary) Sándor Andó-Szabó

16 March 2014 20	Ferencváros	1–1	Debrecen	Budapest, Pest County
16:30 CET	Somália 8'	(Report)	Volaš 27'	Stadium: Ferenc Puskás Stadium; Attendance: 8,179; Referee: (Hungary) Viktor Kassai

23 March 2014 21	Kecskemét	0–0	Ferencváros	Kecskemét, Bács-Kiskun County
18:30 CET		(Report)		Stadium: Széktói Stadion; Attendance: 4,462; Referee: (Hungary) Zoltán Iványi

29 March 2014 22	Ferencváros	4–0	Pápa	Budapest, Pest County
18:00 CET	Leonardo 32' (pen.); Böde 36'; Mateos 53' (pen.); Somália 75'	(Report)		Stadium: Ferenc Puskás Stadium; Attendance: 6,122; Referee: (Hungary) Dániel Becséri

4 April 2014 23	Újpest	1–2	Ferencváros	Budapest, Pest County
19:00 CEST	Vasiljević 4'	(Report)	Gyömbér 23'; Leonardo 88'	Stadium: Szusza Ferenc Stadium; Attendance: 9,517; Referee: (Hungary) Ádám Farkas

12 April 2014 24	Ferencváros	1–0	Puskás	Budapest, Pest County
14:00 CEST	Mateos 65' (pen.)	(Report)		Stadium: Ferenc Puskás Stadium; Attendance: 6,952; Referee: (Hungary) József Erdős

20 April 2014 25	Honvéd	0–2	Ferencváros	Budapest, Pest County
16:30 CEST		(Report)	Pavlović 28'; Leonardo 35' (pen.)	Stadium: Bozsik Stadion; Attendance: 5,000; Referee: (Hungary) Viktor Kassai

25 April 2014 26	Ferencváros	1–0	Kaposvár	Budapest, Pest County
19:00 CEST	Busai 12'	(Report)		Stadium: Ferenc Puskás Stadium; Attendance: 5,344; Referee: (Hungary) Sándor Andó-Szabó

3 May 2014 27	Mezőkövesd	0–1	Ferencváros	Mezőkövesd, Borsod-Abaúj-Zemplén County
16:00 CEST		(Report)	Busai 29'	Stadium: Mezőkövesdi Városi Stadion; Attendance: 5,000; Referee: (Hungary) Zsolt Szabó

10 May 2014 28	Ferencváros	2–1	Diósgyőr	Budapest, Pest County
14:00 CEST	Bönig 29'; Böde 85'	(Report)	Elek 47'	Stadium: Ferenc Puskás Stadium; Attendance: 11,171; Referee: (Hungary) Viktor Kassai

18 May 2014 29	Haladás	0–1	Ferencváros	Szombathely, Vas County
16:30 CET		(Report)	Diallo 55'	Stadium: Rohonci Street Stadium; Attendance: 6,126; Referee: (Hungary) Sándor Andó-Szabó

1 June 2014 30	Ferencváros	2–0	Paks	Budapest, Pest County
16:30 CEST	Bönig 54'; Leonardo 82' (pen.)	(Report)		Stadium: Ferenc Puskás Stadium; Attendance: 13,689; Referee: (Hungary) Zoltán Iványi

=== Classification ===
Pos	Team	Pld	W	D	L	GF	GA	GD	Pts	Qualification or relegation
1	Debrecen (C)	30	18	8	4	66	33	+33	62	Qualification for Champions League second qualifying round
2	Győr	30	18	8	4	58	32	+26	62	Qualification for Europa League second qualifying round
3	Ferencváros	30	17	6	7	47	33	+14	57	Qualification for Europa League first qualifying round
4	Videoton	30	15	8	7	52	31	+21	53	
5	Diósgyőr	30	12	11	7	45	38	+7	47	Qualification for Europa League first qualifying round (Note: Diósgyőr qualified for the Europa League first qualifying round as the 2013–14 Magyar Kupa runners-up since the winners, Újpest, failed to receive the UEFA license to participate in European competitions.)

Source: mlsz.hu (in Hungarian)
Rules for classification: 1st points; 2nd overall wins; 3rd goal difference; 4th head-to-head points; 5th head-to-head goal difference; 6th head-to-head away goals scored; 7th fair-play points; 8th drawing of lots
(C) Champions

=== Results summary ===
Overall								Home						Away					
Pld	W	D	L	GF	GA	GD	Pts	W	D	L	GF	GA	GD	W	D	L	GF	GA	GD
30	17	6	7	47	33	+14	57	8	3	4	21	14	+7	9	3	3	26	19	+7

Last updated: 1 June 2014.
Source: NB1

=== Results by round ===
Round	1	2	3	4	5	6	7	8	9	10	11	12	13	14	15	16	17	18	19	20	21	22	23	24	25	26	27	28	29	30
Ground	A	H	A	H	A	H	A	H	A	H	A	H	A	H	A	H	A	H	A	H	A	H	A	H	A	H	A	H	A	H
Result	W	L	W	W	L	W	W	W	L	L	D	D	W	L	D	L	W	D	L	D	D	W	W	W	W	W	W	W	W	W
Position	5	8	5	5	5	3	3	2	3	4	4	5	4	6	5	7	5	5	7	8	8	6	5	5	4	4	4	4	3	3

Updated to match(es) played on 1 June 2014. Source: Matches
A = Away; H = Home; W = Win; D = Draw; L = Loss

== Hungarian Cup ==
29 October 2013 Round of 32	Szekszárd	0–10	Ferencváros	Szekszárd, Tolna County
12:30 CET		(Report)	Böde 10', 71', 78'; Busai 16', 90+1'; Józsi 39' (pen.), 48'; Somália 61'; Bönig 73'; Valpoort 81'	Stadium: Stadion Városi; Attendance: 2,650; Referee: (Hungary) Szabolcs Szilasi

27 November 2013 Round of 16 (1st leg)	Ferencváros	0–0	Újpest	Budapest, Pest County
18:00 CET		(Report)		Stadium: Stadium Puskás Ferenc; Attendance: 8,845; Referee: (Hungary) Zoltán Iványi

4 December 2013 Round of 16 (2nd leg)	Újpest	1–0 (1–0 agg.)	Ferencváros	Budapest, Pest County
18:00 CET	Vasiljević 72'	Report		Stadium: Szusza Ferenc Stadium; Attendance: 5,850; Referee: (Hungary) Viktor Kassai

== League Cup ==
=== Group stage ===
4 September 2013 1	Ferencváros	2–1	Sopron	Budapest, Pest County
20:30 CEST	Ionescu 24'; Diallo 53'	(Report)	Nyilasi 61'	Stadium: Ferenc Puskás Stadium; Attendance: 400; Referee: (Hungary) Szabolcs Szilasi

11 September 2013 2	Tatabánya	1–4	Ferencváros	Tatabánya, Komárom-Esztergom County
17:00 CEST	Szabó 2'	(Report)	Holman 40'; Diallo 43', 45'; Mateos 57'	Stadium: Stadion Városi; Attendance: 800; Referee: (Hungary) Gergely Szőts

16 November 2013 3	Ferencváros	2–1	Győr	Budapest, Pest County
17:00 CET	Diallo 52', 61'	(Report)	Varga 38'	Stadium: Puskás Ferenc Stadium; Attendance: 2,500; Referee: (Hungary) Gábor Oláh

16 October 2013 4	Győr	4–1	Ferencváros	Győr, Győr-Moson-Sopron County
19:30 CEST	Varga 8', 88'; Kronaveter 45'; Andrić 73'	(Report)	Gyömbér 30'	Stadium: ETO Park; Referee: (Hungary) Gergely Szőts

13 November 2013 5	Ferencváros	2–0	Tatabánya	Budapest, Pest County
18:00 CET	Gyömbér 31'; Busai 69'	(Report)		Stadium: Puskás Ferenc Stadium; Attendance: 200; Referee: (Hungary) Roland Veizer

20 November 2013 6	Sopron	1–3	Ferencváros	Sopron, Győr-Moson-Sopron County
17:00 CET	Nyilasi 4'	(Report)	Böde 23', 57', 61'	Stadium: Stadion Városi; Attendance: 500; Referee: (Hungary) Ádám Radványi

==== Classification ====
Pos	Team	Pld	W	D	L	GF	GA	GD	Pts	Qualification
1	Ferencváros	6	5	0	1	14	8	+6	15	Advance to knockout phase
2	Győr	6	4	1	1	21	5	+16	13	Advance to knockout phase
3	Sopron	6	2	1	3	13	11	+2	7	
4	Tatabánya	6	0	0	6	2	26	−24	0	

Rules for classification: 1) points; 2) goal difference; 3) number of goals scored.

=== Knockout phase ===
22 February 2014 Round of 16 (1st leg)	Szombathely	0–0	Ferencváros	Szombathely, Vas County
14:00 CET		(Report)		Stadium: Rohonci Street Stadium; Attendance: 1,700; Referee: (Hungary) Gábor Oláh

4 March 2014 Round of 16 (2nd leg)	Ferencváros	2–0 (2–0 agg.)	Szombathely	Budapest, Pest County
18:00 CET	Jenner 76' 90'	(Report)		Stadium: Ferenc Puskás Stadium; Attendance: 700; Referee: (Hungary) Zoltán Iványi

19 March 2014 Quarter-final (1st leg)	Ferencváros	4–0	Pápa	Budapest, Pest County
18:00 CET	Ugrai 5' (pen.), 9'; Jenner 61'; Holman 84'	(Report)		Stadium: Ferenc Puskás Stadium; Attendance: 1,200; Referee: (Hungary) Mihály Fábián

1 April 2014 Quarter-final (2nd leg)	Pápa	0–2 (0–6 agg.)	Ferencváros	Pápa, Veszprém County
17:00 CEST		(Report)	Ugrai 24'; Diallo 44'	Stadium: Stadion Várkerti; Attendance: 300; Referee: (Hungary) Ádám Radványi

23 April 2014 Semi-final (1st leg)	Ferencváros	1–2	Diósgyőr	Budapest, Pest County
18:00 CEST	Péter 27'	(Report)	Alves 48'; Bacsa 65'	Stadium: Ferenc Puskás Stadium; Attendance: 2,000; Referee: (Hungary) Zoltán Iványi

30 April 2014 Semi-final (2nd leg)	Diósgyőr	1–1 (3–2 agg.)	Ferencváros	Miskolc, Borsod-Abaúj-Zemplén County
17:30 CEST	Bacsa 44'	(Report)	Mateos 54' (pen.)	Stadium: DVTK Stadion; Attendance: 2,871; Referee: (Hungary) Ádám Németh

== Pre-season ==
29 June 2013 1	Ferencváros (Hungary)	4–1	(Hungary) Szekszárdi UFC	Budapest, Pest County
CEST	Čukić 12'; Böde 18'; Jenner 27'; Busai 48'	(Report)	Hencz 75'	Stadium: Stadion Puskás Ferenc; Attendance: 1,000; Referee: (Hungary)

3 July 2013 2	Ferencváros (Hungary)	4–1	(Hungary) Vasas SC	Budapest, Pest County
CEST	Böde 8', 48'; Somália 18'; Halilagić 71'	(Report)	Crişan 21' (pen.)	Stadium: Stadion Puskás Ferenc; Attendance: 1,000; Referee: (Hungary)

6 July 2013 3	Ferencváros (Hungary)	3–2	(Morocco) Raja Casablanca	Telki, Pest County
CEST	Böde 14', 28'; Somália 88'	(Report)	Salhi 26' (pen.); Kachani 50'	Stadium: Globall Football Park & Sporthotel; Attendance: – Referee: (Hungary)

10 July 2013 4	Ferencváros (Hungary)	1–1	(Poland) Piast Gliwice	Telki, Pest County
CEST	Böde 66'	(Report)	Klepczyński 70'	Stadium: Globall Football Park & Sporthotel; Attendance: – Referee: (Hungary)

13 July 2013 5	Ferencváros (Hungary)	3–2	(Hungary) Kozármisleny	Telki, Pest County
CEST	Valpoort 1'; Böde 47', 80'	(Report)	Nagy 70'; Varga 45'	Stadium: Globall Football Park & Sporthotel; Attendance: – Referee: (Hungary)

16 July 2013 6	Ferencváros (Hungary)	1–0	(England) Leeds United	Murska Sobota
18:00 CEST	Böde 52'	(Report)		Stadium: Fazanerija City Stadium
