= 2012–13 Ferencvárosi TC season =

Ferencvárosi TC
2012–13 season
- Chairman: Gábor Kubatov
- Manager: Lajos Détári (until 20 August); Ricardo Moniz
- NB 1: 5th
- Hungarian Cup: 2nd round
- Hungarian League Cup: Winner
- Top goalscorer: League: Dániel Böde (17); All: Dániel Böde (20)
- Highest home attendance: 16,000 v Újpest (10 March 2013)
- Lowest home attendance: 300 v MTK (5 December 2012)
Home colours	Away colours	Third colours

The 2012–13 season was Ferencvárosi TC's 110th competitive season, 4th consecutive season in the OTP Bank Liga and 113th year in existence as a football club.

== First team squad ==
Note: Flags indicate national team as defined under FIFA eligibility rules; some limited exceptions apply. Players may hold more than one non-FIFA nationality.

No.	Pos.	Nation	Player
3	DF	NED	Mark Otten
4	DF	HUN	Dániel Sváb
5	DF	GER	Philipp Bönig
7	MF	BIH	Aleksandar Jovanović
8	MF	HUN	György Józsi
10	FW	SRB	Milan Perić (loan from Videoton)
11	MF	BEL	Stanley Aborah
13	MF	HUN	Dániel Böde
14	MF	ROU	Andrei Ionescu
15	DF	HUN	János Birtalan
16	MF	HUN	Tamás Csilus
18	MF	HUN	András Gárdos
19	MF	HUN	Gábor Gyömbér

No.	Pos.	Nation	Player
21	DF	BIH	Muhamed Bešić
23	DF	BRA	Júnior Fell
27	MF	NED	Julian Jenner
30	MF	SRB	Vladan Čukić
33	MF	HUN	Dávid Holman
39	MF	HUN	Márk Orosz
44	DF	CZE	Martin Klein
55	GK	HUN	Levente Jova
66	MF	SRB	Aleksandar Alempijević
77	MF	FIN	Juha Hakola
88	FW	BRA	Somália
91	FW	NED	Quenten Martinus
99	FW	BRA	Leonardo Santiago
TBA	GK	HUN	Péter Kurucz

== Transfers ==
=== Summer ===
In: Note: Flags indicate national team as defined under FIFA eligibility rules; some limited exceptions apply. Players may hold more than one non-FIFA nationality.

No.	Pos.	Nation	Player
5	DF	GER	Philipp Bönig (from (Germany) Bochum)
10	FW	SRB	Milan Perić (loan from Videoton)
11	FW	HUN	János Máté (from Videoton)
12	GK	HUN	Tamás Mester (loan return from Budaörsi SC)
13	MF	HUN	Dániel Böde (from Paks)
14	MF	ROU	Andrei Ionescu (from (Belgium) Royal Antwerp)
17	FW	HUN	Viktor Bölcsföldi (loan return from Szigetszentmiklós)
19	MF	HUN	Gábor Gyömbér (from Pápa)
20	MF	HUN	Attila Menyhárt (from Rákospalota)
21	DF	BIH	Muhamed Bešić (from (Germany) Hamburg)
27	MF	NED	Julian Jenner (from (Netherlands) Vitesse Arnhem)
30	MF	SRB	Vladan Čukić (from Kecskemét)
39	MF	HUN	Márk Orosz (from Szeged)
66	MF	SRB	Aleksandar Alempijević (from Kecskemét)
88	FW	BRA	Somália (from (Brazil) Bangu)

Out: Note: Flags indicate national team as defined under FIFA eligibility rules; some limited exceptions apply. Players may hold more than one non-FIFA nationality.

No.	Pos.	Nation	Player
10	MF	HUN	Krisztián Lisztes (to Szeged)
11	FW	HUN	Lóránt Oláh (loan return to Kaposvár)
12	GK	HUN	Tamás Mester (to Balmazújváros)
13	DF	BRA	Júnior (to (Azerbaijan) AZAL)
19	MF	SOM	Liban Abdi (to (Portugal) Olhanense)
20	MF	HUN	Dénes Rósa
21	MF	HUN	Norbert Zsivóczky (loan to Szigetszentmiklós)
25	MF	HUN	Béla Maróti (to Pápa)
27	MF	HUN	Dávid Kulcsár (to Paks)
29	DF	HUN	Noel Fülöp (to Siófok)
35	MF	ARG	Héctor Gabriel Morales (loan return to (Argentina) Estudiantes)
40	GK	HUN	Zoltán Végh (retired)
60	FW	HUN	Péter Pölöskey (to Debrecen)
78	DF	HUN	Zoltán Balog (to Gyirmót)
88	FW	BRA	Somália (loan return to (Brazil) Bangu)
97	FW	CRO	Marko Šimić (to (Poland) GKS Bełchatów)

=== Winter ===
In: Note: Flags indicate national team as defined under FIFA eligibility rules; some limited exceptions apply. Players may hold more than one non-FIFA nationality.

No.	Pos.	Nation	Player
11	MF	BEL	Stanley Aborah (from (Slovenia) Mura)
16	MF	HUN	Tamás Csilus (from Ferencváros U-19)
20	FW	NED	Quenten Martinus (from (Netherlands) Heerenveen)
23	DF	BRA	Júnior Fell (from (Brazil) Metropolitano)
99	FW	BRA	Leonardo Santiago (from (Netherlands) Breda)

Out: Note: Flags indicate national team as defined under FIFA eligibility rules; some limited exceptions apply. Players may hold more than one non-FIFA nationality.

No.	Pos.	Nation	Player
11	FW	HUN	János Máté (loan to Ferencváros)
20	MF	HUN	Attila Menyhárt (to Ferencváros)
22	MF	HUN	Attila Busai (loan to Szolnok)
26	DF	HUN	Tamás Grúz (loan to Szolnok)
99	FW	HUN	Gergő Beliczky (to Pápa)

- List of Hungarian football transfers summer 2012
- List of Hungarian football transfers winter 2012–13

== Statistics ==
=== Appearances and goals ===
Last updated on 2 June 2013.

No.	Pos	Nat	Player	Total		OTP Bank Liga		Hungarian Cup		League Cup	
No.	Pos	Nat	Player	Apps	Goals	Apps	Goals	Apps	Goals	Apps	Goals
3	DF	(Netherlands) NED	Mark Otten	16	0	11	0	1	0	4	0
4	DF	(Hungary) HUN	Dániel Sváb	31	0	22	0	1	0	8	0
5	DF	(Germany) GER	Philipp Bönig	8	0	7	0	0	0	1	0
7	MF	(Bosnia and Herzegovina) BIH	Aleksandar Jovanović	22	0	16	0	1	0	5	0
8	MF	(Hungary) HUN	György Józsi	35	6	28	5	0	0	7	1
10	FW	(Serbia) SRB	Milan Perić	24	10	16	4	1	0	7	6
11	MF	(Belgium) BEL	Stanley Aborah	10	4	7	1	0	0	3	3
13	MF	(Hungary) HUN	Dániel Böde	37	20	30	17	1	0	6	3
14	MF	(Romania) ROU	Andrei Ionescu	18	2	13	1	1	0	4	1
15	DF	(Hungary) HUN	János Birtalan	1	0	1	0	0	0	0	0
16	MF	(Hungary) HUN	Tamás Csilus	3	0	1	0	0	0	2	0
18	MF	(Hungary) HUN	András Gárdos	4	0	1	0	0	0	3	0
19	MF	(Hungary) HUN	Gábor Gyömbér	39	2	30	2	1	0	8	0
21	DF	(Bosnia and Herzegovina) BIH	Muhamed Bešić	27	1	22	1	1	0	4	0
23	DF	(Brazil) BRA	Júnior Fell	2	0	1	0	0	0	1	0
27	MF	(Netherlands) NED	Julian Jenner	28	9	20	5	1	0	7	4
30	MF	(Serbia) SRB	Vladan Čukić	38	5	28	2	1	0	9	3
33	MF	(Hungary) HUN	Dávid Holman	5	0	4	0	0	0	1	0
39	MF	(Hungary) HUN	Márk Orosz	29	1	20	1	1	0	8	0
44	DF	(Czech Republic) CZE	Martin Klein	25	2	18	2	1	0	6	0
55	GK	(Hungary) HUN	Levente Jova	34	-42	30	-36	0	0	4	-6
66	MF	(Serbia) SRB	Aleksandar Alempijević	20	2	16	2	0	0	4	0
77	MF	(Finland) FIN	Juha Hakola	11	0	7	0	0	0	4	0
88	FW	(Brazil) BRA	Somália	38	8	28	5	1	0	9	3
91	FW	(Netherlands) NED	Quenten Martinus	9	0	7	0	0	0	2	0
99	FW	(Brazil) BRA	Leonardo Santiago	12	2	9	2	0	0	3	0
Youth players:
1	GK	(Slovenia) SVN	Marko Ranilović	7	-6	0	0	1	-2	6	-4
17	MF	(Hungary) HUN	Bence Batik	3	0	0	0	0	0	3	0
24	MF	(Hungary) HUN	Bálint Nyilasi	1	0	0	0	0	0	1	0
41	GK	(Hungary) HUN	Roland Kunsági	1	-1	0	0	0	0	1	-1
Players out to loan:
11	FW	(Hungary) HUN	János Máté	14	4	8	1	0	0	6	3
22	MF	(Hungary) HUN	Attila Busai	5	1	1	0	0	0	4	1
26	DF	(Hungary) HUN	Tamás Grúz	9	0	5	0	0	0	4	0
Players no longer at the club
20	MF	(Hungary) HUN	Attila Menyhárt	1	0	0	0	0	0	1	0
29	DF	(Hungary) HUN	Noel Fülöp	1	0	1	0	0	0	0	0
60	FW	(Hungary) HUN	Péter Pölöskey	1	0	1	0	0	0	0	0
99	FW	(Hungary) HUN	Gergő Beliczky	8	0	4	0	0	0	4	0

=== Top scorers ===
Includes all competitive matches. The list is sorted by shirt number when total goals are equal.

Last updated on 2 June 2013

Position	Nation	Number	Name	OTP Bank Liga	Hungarian Cup	League Cup	Total
1	(Hungary)	13	Dániel Böde	17	0	3	20
2	(Serbia)	10	Milan Perić	4	0	6	10
3	(Netherlands)	27	Julian Jenner	5	0	4	9
4	(Brazil)	88	Somália	5	0	3	8
5	(Hungary)	8	György Józsi	5	0	1	6
6	(Serbia)	30	Vladan Čukić	2	0	3	5
7	(Belgium)	11	Stanley Aborah	1	0	3	4
8	(Hungary)	11	János Máté	1	0	3	4
9	(Serbia)	66	Aleksandar Alempijević	2	0	0	2
10	(Hungary)	19	Gábor Gyömbér	2	0	0	2
11	(Brazil)	99	Leonardo	2	0	0	2
12	(Czech Republic)	44	Martin Klein	2	0	0	2
13	(Romania)	14	Andrei Ionescu	1	0	1	2
14	(Hungary)	39	Márk Orosz	1	0	0	1
15	(Bosnia and Herzegovina)	21	Muhamed Bešić	1	0	0	1
16	(Hungary)	22	Attila Busai	0	0	1	1
/	/	/	Own Goals	0	0	0	0
			TOTALS	51	0	25	76

=== Disciplinary record ===
Includes all competitive matches. Players with 1 card or more included only.

Last updated on 2 June 2013

Position	Nation	Number	Name	OTP Bank Liga		Hungarian Cup		League Cup		Total (Hu Total)	
Position	Nation	Number	Name	Booked	Sent off (straight red)	Booked	Sent off (straight red)	Booked	Sent off (straight red)	Booked	Sent off (straight red)
GK	(Slovenia)	1	Marko Ranilović	1	0	0	0	0	0	1 (1)	0 (0)
DF	(Netherlands)	3	Mark Otten	3	1	0	0	0	0	3 (3)	1 (1)
DF	(Hungary)	4	Dániel Sváb	4	0	0	0	0	0	4 (4)	0 (0)
DF	(Germany)	5	Philipp Bönig	2	0	0	0	1	0	3 (2)	0 (0)
MF	(Bosnia and Herzegovina)	7	Aleksandar Jovanović	4	0	0	0	2	0	6 (4)	0 (0)
MF	(Hungary)	8	György Józsi	1	0	0	0	0	0	1 (1)	0 (0)
FW	(Serbia)	10	Milan Perić	2	0	1	0	2	0	5 (2)	0 (0)
MF	(Belgium)	11	Stanley Aborah	2	0	0	0	1	0	3 (2)	0 (0)
FW	(Hungary)	11	János Máté	0	0	0	0	1	0	1 (0)	0 (0)
FW	(Hungary)	13	Dániel Böde	4	0	0	0	0	0	4 (4)	0 (0)
MF	(Hungary)	16	Tamás Csilus	0	0	0	0	1	0	1 (0)	0 (0)
MF	(Hungary)	19	Gábor Gyömbér	4	0	0	0	1	0	5 (4)	0 (0)
DF	(Bosnia and Herzegovina)	21	Muhamed Bešić	5	1	0	0	1	1	6 (5)	2 (1)
MF	(Hungary)	22	Attila Busai	0	0	0	0	2	0	2 (0)	0 (0)
DF	(Hungary)	26	Tamás Grúz	3	0	0	0	0	0	3 (3)	0 (0)
MF	(Netherlands)	27	Julian Jenner	3	1	0	0	3	0	6 (3)	1 (1)
MF	(Serbia)	30	Vladan Čukić	10	0	1	0	7	0	18 (10)	0 (0)
MF	(Hungary)	33	Dávid Holman	0	0	0	0	1	0	1 (0)	0 (0)
DF	(Czech Republic)	44	Martin Klein	4	1	0	0	0	0	4 (4)	1 (1)
GK	(Hungary)	55	Levente Jova	1	0	0	0	0	0	1 (1)	0 (0)
MF	(Serbia)	66	Aleksandar Alempijević	3	2	0	0	0	0	3 (3)	2 (2)
FW	(Brazil)	88	Somália	3	0	1	0	0	0	4 (3)	0 (0)
FW	(Netherlands)	91	Quenten Martinus	1	0	0	0	0	0	1 (1)	0 (0)
FW	(Brazil)	99	Leonardo Santiago	3	0	0	0	2	0	5 (3)	0 (0)
			TOTALS	63	6	3	0	25	1	91 (63)	7 (6)

=== Overall ===
Games played	42 (30 OTP Bank Liga, 1 Hungarian Cup and 11 Hungarian League Cup)
Games won	22 (13 OTP Bank Liga, 0 Hungarian Cup and 9 Hungarian League Cup)
Games drawn	11 (10 OTP Bank Liga, 0 Hungarian Cup and 1 Hungarian League Cup)
Games lost	9 (7 OTP Bank Liga, 1 Hungarian Cup and 1 Hungarian League Cup)
Goals scored	79
Goals conceded	49
Goal difference	+30
Yellow cards	91
Red cards	7
Worst discipline	(Serbia) Vladan Čukić (18 (yellow card) , 0 (red card) )
Best result	5–0 (A) v Szolnoki MÁV FC - Ligakupa - 13-11-2012
Worst result	0–2 (H) v Budapest Honvéd FC - OTP Bank Liga - 25-08-2012
Worst result	0–2 (H) v Szombathelyi Haladás - Hungarian Cup - 26-09-2012
Worst result	2–4 (A) v MTK Budapest FC - OTP Bank Liga - 03-11-2012
Worst result	2–4 (A) v Lombard-Pápa TFC - Ligakupa - 06-03-2013
Most appearances	(Hungary) Gábor Gyömbér (39 appearances)
Top scorer	(Hungary) Dániel Böde (20 goals)
Points	77/126 (61.11%)

Last updated: 2 June 2013

== Nemzeti Bajnokság I ==
=== Matches ===
28 July 2012 1	Ferencváros	1 – 1	Kecskemét	Budapest, Pest County
20:45 CEST	Alempijević 33'	(Report)	Jorginho 63'	Stadium: Stadion Albert Flórián; Attendance: 5,000; Referee: (Hungary) Zsolt Szabó

4 August 2012 2	Pécs	0 – 0	Ferencváros	Pécs, Baranya County
20:45 CEST		(Report)		Stadium: Stadion PMFC; Attendance: 5,000; Referee: (Hungary) Mihály Fábián

11 August 2012 3	Ferencváros	4 – 1	Pápa	Budapest, Pest County
20:45 CEST	Józsi 6', 17' (pen.); Klein 68'; Máté 73'	(Report)	Maróti 9'	Stadium: Stadion Albert Flórián; Attendance: 4,000; Referee: (Hungary) Ádám Németh

19 August 2012 4	Újpest	2 – 1	Ferencváros	Budapest, Pest County
16:30 CEST	Kabát 28'; Tshibuabua 90+4'	(Report)	Orosz 90'	Stadium: Szusza Ferenc Stadium; Attendance: 9,827; Referee: (Hungary) Tamás Bognár

25 August 2012 5	Ferencváros	0 – 2	Budapest Honvéd	Budapest, Pest County
16:15 CEST		(Report)	Tchami 44'; Délczeg 90+2'	Stadium: Stadion Albert Flórián; Attendance: 5,000; Referee: (Hungary) Zoltán Iványi

1 September 2012 6	Eger	2 – 2	Ferencváros	Debrecen, Hajdú-Bihar County
19:00 CEST	Németh 72', 90+4' (pen.)	(Report)	Perić 47' (pen.); Böde 52'	Stadium: Stadion Oláh Gábor Út; Attendance: 2,000; Referee: (Hungary) Péter Solymosi

14 September 2012 7	Ferencváros	2 – 1	Szombathely	Budapest, Pest County
19:00 CEST	Somália 10'; Čukić 87'	(Report)	Andorka 90+3'	Stadium: Stadion Albert Flórián; Attendance: 4,500; Referee: (Hungary) Ádám Farkas

23 September 2012 8	Siófok	0 – 0	Ferencváros	Siófok, Somogy County
18:30 CEST		(Report)		Stadium: Révész Street Stadium; Attendance: 1,500; Referee: (Hungary) János Takács

30 September 2012 9	Ferencváros	2 – 0	Diósgyőr	Budapest, Pest County
16:30 CEST	Böde 70'; Perić 90+2'	(Report)		Stadium: Stadion Albert Flórián; Attendance: 5,000; Referee: (Hungary) Dániel Becséri

7 October 2012 10	Videoton	1 – 2	Ferencváros	Székesfehérvár, Fejér County
16:30 CEST	Nikolić 69' (pen.)	(Report)	Józsi 7' (pen.); Böde 74'	Stadium: Sóstói Stadion; Attendance: 5,000; Referee: (Hungary) Zoltán Iványi

19 October 2012 11	Ferencváros	2 – 2	Paks	Budapest, Pest County
19:00 CEST	Ionescu 40'; Gyömbér 88'	(Report)	Simon 54'; Jovanović 85' (o.g.)	Stadium: Stadion Albert Flórián; Attendance: 4,000; Referee: (Hungary) Péter Solymosi

28 October 2012 12	Ferencváros	1 – 1	Győr	Budapest, Pest County
18:30 CEST	Alempijević 62'	(Report)	Varga 7'	Stadium: Stadion Albert Flórián; Attendance: 6,100; Referee: (Hungary) Tamás Bognár

3 November 2012 13	MTK Budapest	4 – 2	Ferencváros	Budapest, Pest County
14:00 CET	Csiki 10', 44'; Hidvégi 90'; Könyves 90+2'	(Report)	Józsi 37'; Böde 80'	Stadium: Hidegkuti Nándor Stadium; Attendance: 4,000; Referee: (Hungary) Viktor Kassai

11 November 2012 14	Ferencváros	2 – 1	Debrecen	Budapest, Pest County
16:30 CET	Böde 34'; Józsi 90' (pen.)	(Report)	Coulibaly 10'	Stadium: Stadion Albert Flórián; Attendance: 7,943; Referee: (Hungary) Mihály Fábián

18 November 2012 15	Kaposvár	1 – 0	Ferencváros	Kaposvár, Somogy County
16:30 CET	Pavlović 72'	(Report)		Stadium: Stadion Kaposvár Rákóczi; Attendance: 3,000; Referee: (Hungary) Péter Solymosi

24 November 2012 16	Kecskemét	2 – 2	Ferencváros	Kecskemét, Bács-Kiskun County
16:00 CET	Burgos 28'; Forró 50'	(Report)	Böde 63'; Jenner 80'	Stadium: Széktói Stadion; Attendance: 4,000; Referee: (Hungary) Tamás Bognár

2 December 2012 17	Ferencváros	3 – 2	Pécs	Budapest, Pest County
18:30 CET	Böde 70', 90+4'; Perić 78'	(Report)	Wittrédi 39'; Bajzát 48'	Stadium: Stadion Albert Flórián; Attendance: 5,588; Referee: (Hungary) Ádám Farkas

3 March 2013 18	Pápa	0 – 3	Ferencváros	Pápa, Veszprém County
16:30 CET		(Report)	Jenner 17'; Aborah 23'; Böde 84'	Stadium: Stadion Várkerti; Attendance: 5,000; Referee: (Hungary) Ádám Farkas

10 March 2013 19	Ferencváros	2 – 1	Újpest	Budapest, Pest County
16:30 CET	Somália 41'; Čukić 90+3'	(Report)	Kabát 51'	Stadium: Stadion Albert Flórián; Attendance: 16,000; Referee: (Hungary) Péter Solymosi

16 April 2013 20	Budapest Honvéd	1 – 0	Ferencváros	Budapest, Pest County
20:30 CEST	Tchami 66'	(Report)		Stadium: Bozsik Stadion; Attendance: 4,500; Referee: (Hungary) Zoltán Iványi

30 March 2013 21	Ferencváros	4 – 0	Eger	Budapest, Pest County
16:30 CET	Böde 4', 74'; Jenner 10'; Somália 67'	(Report)		Stadium: Stadion Puskás Ferenc; Attendance: 4,000; Referee: (Hungary) Zoltán Iványi

6 April 2013 22	Haladás	0 – 0	Ferencváros	Szombathely, Vas County
16:00 CEST		(Report)		Stadium: Stadion Rohonci Út; Attendance: 5,205; Referee: (Hungary) Sándor Andó-Szabó

13 April 2013 23	Ferencváros	4 – 2	Siófok	Budapest, Pest County
16:30 CEST	Böde 11', 54', 65'; Leonardo 89'	(Report)	Timár 27'; Melczer 72'	Stadium: Stadion Puskás Ferenc; Attendance: 5,500; Referee: (Hungary) József Erdős

21 April 2013 24	Diósgyőr	2 – 2	Ferencváros	Miskolc, Borsod-Abaúj-Zemplén County
16:30 CEST	Seydi 13', 73'	(Report)	Jenner 7'; Gyömbér 43'	Stadium: DVTK Stadion; Attendance: 10,000; Referee: (Hungary) Péter Solymosi

28 April 2013 25	Ferencváros	0 – 1	Videoton	Budapest, Pest County
16:30 CEST		(Report)	Torghelle 1'	Stadium: Stadion Puskás Ferenc; Attendance: 10,128; Referee: (Hungary) Viktor Kassai

5 May 2013 26	Paks	1 – 3	Ferencváros	Paks, Tolna County
18:30 CET	Lázok 88' (pen.)	(Report)	Leonardo 45'; Bešić 66'; Klein 73'	Stadium: Stadion PSE; Attendance: 5,000; Referee: (Hungary) Sándor Andó-Szabó

12 May 2013 27	Győr	1 – 0	Ferencváros	Győr, Győr-Moson-Sopron County
18:30 CEST	Völgyi 60' (pen.)	(Report)		Stadium: ETO Park; Attendance: 13,700; Referee: (Hungary) Ádám Farkas

18 May 2013 28	Ferencváros	2 – 0	MTK Budapest	Győr, Győr-Moson-Sopron County
14:00 CEST	Somália 52'; Böde 68'	(Report)		Stadium: ETO Park; Attendance: 2,500; Referee: (Hungary) Viktor Kassai

26 May 2013 29	Debrecen	2 – 3	Ferencváros	Debrecen, Hajdú-Bihar County
16:30 CEST	Coulibaly 32' (pen.), 90' (pen.)	(Report)	Somália 6'; Jenner 36'; Perić 83'	Stadium: Stadion Oláh Gábor Út; Attendance: 9,000; Referee: (Hungary) Tamás Bognár

31 May 2013 30	Ferencváros	2 – 2	Kaposvár	Győr, Győr-Moson-Sopron County
19:00 CEST	Böde 21' (pen.), 60' (pen.)	(Report)	Okuka 55'; Waltner 84' (pen.)	Stadium: ETO Park; Attendance: 4,000; Referee: (Hungary) Zsolt Szabó

=== Classification ===
Pos	Team	Pld	W	D	L	GF	GA	GD	Pts	Qualification or relegation
3	Honvéd	30	15	7	8	50	36	+14	52	Qualification for Europa League first qualifying round
4	MTK	30	15	6	9	43	30	+13	51	
5	Ferencváros	30	13	10	7	51	36	+15	49	
6	Debrecen	30	14	4	12	47	36	+11	46	Qualification for Europa League second qualifying round (Note: Debrecen qualified for the Europa League second qualifying round as the 2012–13 Magyar Kupa winners.)
7	Kecskemét	30	12	8	10	42	42	0	44	

Source: mlsz.hu (in Hungarian)
Rules for classification: 1st points; 2nd overall wins; 3rd goal difference; 4th head-to-head points; 5th head-to-head goal difference; 6th head-to-head away goals scored; 7th fair-play points; 8th drawing of lots

=== Results summary ===
Overall								Home						Away					
Pld	W	D	L	GF	GA	GD	Pts	W	D	L	GF	GA	GD	W	D	L	GF	GA	GD
30	13	10	7	51	36	+15	49	9	4	2	31	17	+14	4	6	5	20	19	+1

Last updated: 2 June 2013.
Source: NB1

=== Results by round ===
Round	1	2	3	4	5	6	7	8	9	10	11	12	13	14	15	16	17	18	19	20	21	22	23	24	25	26	27	28	29	30
Ground	H	A	H	A	H	A	H	A	H	A	H	H	A	H	A	A	H	A	H	A	H	A	H	A	H	A	A	H	A	H
Result	D	D	W	L	L	D	W	D	W	W	D	D	L	W	L	D	W	W	W	L	W	D	W	D	L	W	L	W	W	D
Position	10	11	5	9	10	9	8	8	7	6	5	5	8	6	7	7	6	5	5	5	4	4	4	4	6	5	6	6	5	5

Updated to match(es) played on 2 June 2013. Source: Matches
A = Away; H = Home; W = Win; D = Draw; L = Loss

=== Points by opponent ===
Team	Results		Points
Team	Home	Away	Points
Budapest Honvéd	0–2	0–1	0
Debrecen	2–1	3–2	6
Diósgyőr	2–0	2–2	4
Eger	4–0	2–2	4
Győr	1–1	0–1	1
Kaposvári Rákóczi	2–2	0–1	1
Kecskemét	1–1	2–2	2
Pápa	4–1	3–0	6
MTK Budapest	2–0	2–4	3
Paks	2–2	3–1	4
Pécs	3–2	0–0	4
Siófok	4–2	0–0	4
Szombathelyi Haladás	2–1	0–0	4
Újpest	2–1	1–2	3
Videoton	0–1	2–1	3

== Hungarian Cup ==
26 September 2012 2	Ferencvárosi TC	0 – 2	Szombathelyi Haladás	Budapest, Pest County
18:00 CEST		(Report)	Halmosi 47'; Andorka 48'	Stadium: Stadion Albert Flórián; Attendance: 1,000; Referee: (Hungary) Zsolt Szabó

== League Cup ==
=== Group stage ===
5 September 2012 1	MTK Budapest	0 – 1	Ferencváros	Budapest, Pest County
18:00 CEST		(Report)	Somália 12'	Stadium: Hidegkuti Nándor Stadium; Attendance: 400; Referee: (Hungary) Balázs Böcskei

9 September 2012 2	Ferencváros	2 – 1	Kecskemét	Budapest, Pest County
18:30 CEST	Somália 27'; Böde 66'	(Report)	Balázs 42'	Stadium: Stadion Albert Flórián; Attendance: 500; Referee: (Hungary) Sándor Andó-Szabó

10 October 2012 3	Ferencváros	2 – 1	Szolnok	Budapest, Pest County
18:00 CEST	Perić 20'; Máté 90' (pen.)	(Report)	Szepessy 3'	Stadium: Stadion Albert Flórián; Attendance: 600; Referee: (Hungary) Ádám Radványi

13 October 2012 4	Kecskemét	2 – 2	Ferencváros	Kecskemét, Bács-Kiskun County
16:00 CEST	Salami 10'; Litsingi 15'	(Report)	Jenner 36'; Ionescu 60'	Stadium: Széktói Stadion; Attendance: 700; Referee: (Hungary) Szabolcs Szilasi

13 November 2012 5	Szolnok	0 – 5	Ferencváros	Szolnok, Jász-Nagykun-Szolnok County
13:30 CET		(Report)	Perić 19', 43' (pen.), 73'; Busai 52'; Máté 76' (pen.)	Stadium: Tiszaligeti Stadion; Attendance: 100; Referee: (Hungary) Krisztián Pánczél

5 December 2012 6	Ferencváros	2 – 0	MTK Budapest	Budapest, Pest County
17:00 CEST	Perić 1'; Máté 16'	(Report)		Stadium: Stadion Albert Flórián; Attendance: 300; Referee: (Hungary) Viktor Kassai

==== Classification ====
Pos	Team	Pld	W	D	L	GF	GA	GD	Pts	Qualification
1	Ferencváros	6	5	1	0	14	4	+10	16	Advance to knockout phase
2	Kecskemét	6	2	3	1	12	7	+5	9	
3	MTK	6	1	2	3	5	7	−2	5	
4	Szolnok	6	0	2	4	5	18	−13	2	

Rules for classification: 1) points; 2) goal difference; 3) number of goals scored.

=== Knockout phase ===
20 February 2013 Quarter-final (1st leg)	Ferencváros	3 – 1	Pápa	Budapest, Pest County
16:00 CET	Józsi 40'; Jenner 42'; Böde 50'	(Report)	Marić 57'	Stadium: Stadio Albert Flórián; Attendance: 1,200; Referee: (Hungary) Sándor Andó-Szabó

6 February 2013 Quarter-final (2nd leg)	Pápa	4 – 2 (5 – 5 (a) agg.)	Ferencváros	Pápa, Veszprém County
17:00 CET	Arsić 30'; Orozco 64'; Lagator 89'; Szabó 117'	(Report)	Böde 53'; Čukić 93'	Stadium: Stadion Várkerti; Attendance: 1,200; Referee: (Hungary) Ádám Radványi

20 March 2013 Semi-final (1st leg)	Eger	1 – 3	Ferencváros	Vác, Pest County
18:00 CET	Mecinović 22'	(Report)	Jenner 35'; Aborah 37'; Čukić 53'	Stadium: Stadion Városi Vác; Attendance: 1,000; Referee: (Hungary) Zsolt Szabó

23 March 2013 Semi-final (2nd leg)	Ferencváros	1 – 0 (4 – 1 agg.)	Eger	Budapest, Pest County
18:00 CET	Perić 16'	(Report)		Stadium: Stadion Albert Flórián; Attendance: 800; Referee: (Hungary) Dániel Becséri

24 April 2013 Final	Ferencváros	5 – 1	Videoton	Székesfehérvár, Fejér County
17:30 CEST	Čukić 21'; Jenner 27'; Aborah 39', 70'; Somália 75'	(Report)	Mitrović 23'	Stadium: Stadion Sóstói; Attendance: 6,200; Referee: (Hungary) Ádám Farkas
