= 2006–07 Paksi FC season =

Paks
2006–07 season
- Chairman: János Süli
- Manager: Ferenc Lengyel
- Stadium: Fehérvári úti Stadion
- Nemzeti Bajnokság I: 11th
- Hungarian Cup: Round of 32

The 2006–07 season was Paksi Football Club's 1st competitive season, 1st consecutive season in the Nemzeti Bajnokság I and 54th year in existence as a football club.In addition to the domestic league, Paks participate in this season's editions of the Hungarian Cup.

== Transfers ==
=== Summer ===
In: Note: Flags indicate national team as defined under FIFA eligibility rules; some limited exceptions apply. Players may hold more than one non-FIFA nationality.

No.	Pos.	Nation	Player
2	DF	HUN	Zoltán Molnár (from Vasas)
6	MF	HUN	János Zováth (from Vasas)
11	FW	HUN	Tibor Montvai (from Zalaegerszeg)
13	FW	HUN	Dániel Böde (from youth sector)
16	DF	HUN	Tibor Heffler (from youth sector)
25	DF	HUN	Sándor Ambrus (from MTK Budapest II)
49	DF	HUN	Sándor Horváth (from Érd)
83	FW	HUN	Miklós Belényesi (from Dunaújváros FC)
—	FW	HUN	Ferenc Horváth (from Fehérvár)
—	DF	HUN	Barnabás Vári (from Dunaújváros FC)

Out: Note: Flags indicate national team as defined under FIFA eligibility rules; some limited exceptions apply. Players may hold more than one non-FIFA nationality.

No.	Pos.	Nation	Player
—	FW	HUN	Árpád Nógrádi (to Pécs)
—	FW	HUN	Attila Szabados (to Pécs)

=== Winter ===
In: Note: Flags indicate national team as defined under FIFA eligibility rules; some limited exceptions apply. Players may hold more than one non-FIFA nationality.

No.	Pos.	Nation	Player
—	DF	HUN	Viktor Hanák (from Győr)
—	MF	HUN	Iván Balaskó (from Pécs)
—	FW	HUN	Gábor Bardi (from Szolnok)
—	MF	HUN	Roland Bohner (from Mohács)

Out: Note: Flags indicate national team as defined under FIFA eligibility rules; some limited exceptions apply. Players may hold more than one non-FIFA nationality.

No.	Pos.	Nation	Player
4	DF	HUN	Ferenc Benedeczki (Retired)
11	FW	HUN	Tibor Montvai (to Nyíregyháza)
14	DF	HUN	Péter Barics (loan to Dunaújváros)

== Competitions ==
=== Overview ===
Competition	First match	Last match	Starting round	Final position	Record							
Competition	First match	Last match	Starting round	Final position	Pld	W	D	L	GF	GA	GD	Win %
Nemzeti Bajnokság I	28 July 2006	26 May 2007	Matchday 1	11th	30	10	7	13	34	38	−4	33.33
Hungarian Cup	20 September 2006	25 October 2006	Round of 64	Round of 32	2	1	0	1	1	2	−1	50.00
Total					32	11	7	14	35	40	−5	34.38

Last updated: 2 March 2023
Source: Competitions

=== Nemzeti Bajnokság I ===
==== League table ====
Pos	Team	Pld	W	D	L	GF	GA	GD	Pts
9	Diósgyőr	30	11	5	14	40	52	−12	38
10	Sopron	30	11	4	15	33	46	−13	37
11	Paks	30	10	7	13	34	38	−4	37
12	Tatabánya	30	11	3	16	46	58	−12	36
13	Győr	30	9	8	13	37	43	−6	35

Source: soccerway.com

==== Results summary ====
Overall								Home						Away					
Pld	W	D	L	GF	GA	GD	Pts	W	D	L	GF	GA	GD	W	D	L	GF	GA	GD
30	10	7	13	34	38	−4	37	6	5	4	18	14	+4	4	2	9	16	24	−8

Last updated: 26 February 2023.
Source: Worldfootball

==== Results by round ====
Round	1	2	3	4	5	6	7	8	9	10	11	12	13	14	15	16	17	18	19	20	21	22	23	24	25	26	27	28	29	30
Ground	A	H	A	H	A	H	A	H	A	H	A	H	A	A	H	H	A	H	A	H	A	H	A	H	A	H	A	H	H	A
Result	W	D	L	L	L	W	L	D	L	W	W	L	D	W	W	D	L	L	D	W	L	D	L	D	L	W	W	L	W	L
Position	3	4	9	13	14	9	11	12	12	11	10	10	11	9	7	8	8	10	11	9	11	11	13	12	14	10	10	11	11	11

Updated to match(es) played on 26 February 2023. Source: Matches
A = Away; H = Home; W = Win; D = Draw; L = Loss

==== Matches ====
28 July 2006 1	Vác	0–2	Paks	Vác
19:00 CEST		Report	Buzás 13'; Kiss 40'	Stadium: Ligeti Stadion; Attendance: 1,500; Referee: Zoltán Iványi

6 August 2006 2	Paks	0–0	Debrecen	Paks
17:30 CEST	Molnár (red card) 78'; Fehér (red card) 85'	Report		Stadium: Fehérvári úti Stadion; Attendance: 4,000; Referee: Ferenc Bede

19 August 2006 3	Tatabánya	3–0	Paks	Tatabánya
17:30 CEST	Csopaki 19'; Kouemaha 44', 73'	Report		Stadium: Városi Stadion; Attendance: 2,000; Referee: Zsolt Szabó

27 August 2006 4	Paks	0–2	Fehérvár	Paks
17:30 CEST		Report	Csizmadia 47'; Sitku 67'	Stadium: Fehérvári úti Stadion; Attendance: 3,000; Referee: Viktor Kassai

10 September 2006 5	MTK Budapest	1–0	Paks	Budapest
19:00 CEST	Urbán 78'	Report	Horváth (red card) 90+4'	Stadium: Hidegkuti Nándor Stadion; Attendance: 1,000; Referee: Mihály Fábián

16 September 2006 6	Paks	2–1	Diósgyőr	Paks
16:00 CEST	Báló 12'; Belényesi 19'	Report	Simon 5'; Katona (red card) 89'	Stadium: Fehérvári úti Stadion; Attendance: 1,000; Referee: István Vad

23 September 2006 7	Győr	2–1	Paks	Győr
14:00 CEST	Bajzát 62'; Tokody 72'	Report	Heffler 75'	Stadium: Nádorvárosi Stadion; Attendance: 2,800; Referee: Szabolcs Szilasi

30 September 2006 8	Paks	1–1	Újpest	Paks
16:00 CEST	Varga 86'	Report	Rajczi 28'	Stadium: Fehérvári úti Stadion; Attendance: 5,000; Referee: Sándor Gergely

14 October 2006 9	Rákospalota	4–3	Paks	Budapest
15:00 CEST	Cseri 23'; Bárányos 30'; Torma 45'; Nyerges 55'	Report	Kiss 58'; Heffler 71'; Molnár 89'	Stadium: Budai II. László Stadion; Attendance: 1,200; Referee: Zoltán Iványi

21 October 2006 10	Paks	2–0	Zalaegerszeg	Paks
14:30 CEST	Buzás 50'; Kiss 69'	Report		Stadium: Fehérvári úti Stadion; Attendance: 2,000; Referee: Zsolt Szabó

28 October 2006 11	Sopron	1–3	Paks	Sopron
18:00 CEST	Bagoly 45'; Horváth (red card) 78'	Report	Kóczián 25'; Belényesi 30'; Varga 79'	Stadium: Káposztás utcai Stadion; Attendance: 2,425; Referee: Tamás Bognár

4 November 2006 12	Paks	0–1	Pécs	Paks
13:30 CET		Report	Lantos 14'	Stadium: Fehérvári úti Stadion; Attendance: 1,000; Referee: Csaba Sápi

13 November 2006 13	Budapest Honvéd	0–0	Paks	Budapest
18:00 CET		Report	Tamási (red card) 46'	Stadium: Béke téri Stadion; Attendance: 200; Referee: Mihály Fábián

17 November 2006 14	Vasas	0–1	Paks	Budapest
18:00 CET		Report	Zováth 74'	Stadium: Illovszky Rudolf Stadion; Attendance: 1,000; Referee: István Vad

25 November 2006 15	Paks	1–0	Kaposvár	Paks
13:00 CET	Belényesi 20'	Report		Stadium: Fehérvári úti Stadion; Attendance: 1,000; Referee: Zoltán Iványi

2 December 2006 16	Paks	0–0	Vác	Paks
13:30 CET		Report		Stadium: Fehérvári úti Stadion; Attendance: 1,000; Referee: Zsolt Szabó

10 December 2006 17	Debrecen	1–0	Paks	Debrecen
15:00 CET	Macaé 85'	Report		Stadium: Oláh Gábor utcai Stadion; Attendance: 7,000; Referee: Tamás Arany

24 February 2007 18	Paks	0–1	Tatabánya	Paks
14:00 CET		Report	Kouemaha 1'	Stadium: Fehérvári úti Stadion; Attendance: 1,500; Referee: Ferenc Bede

3 March 2007 19	Fehérvár	1–1	Paks	Székesfehérvár
16:00 CET	Kuttor 81'; Farkas (red card) 89'; Mohl (red card) 90+2'	Report	Kiss 11'	Stadium: Sóstói Stadion; Attendance: 700; Referee: Viktor Kassai

10 March 2007 20	Paks	3–1	MTK Budapest	Paks
14:30 CET	Lambulić 1' (o.g.); Kiss 30'; Belényesi 74'	Report	Kanta 61'	Stadium: Fehérvári úti Stadion; Attendance: 2,000; Referee: Tamás Bognár

17 March 2007 21	Diósgyőr	2–1	Paks	Miskolc
15:00 CET	Rubint 21'; Farkas 34'	Report	Katona 87' (o.g.)	Stadium: Diósgyőri Stadion; Attendance: 3,500; Referee: Krisztián Pánczél

31 March 2007 22	Paks	2–2	Győr	Paks
15:00 CEST	Horváth 55', 86'	Report	Brnović 15'; Stark 85'	Stadium: Fehérvári úti Stadion; Attendance: 2,000; Referee: Csaba Sápi

9 April 2007 23	Újpest	3–2	Paks	Budapest
18:00 CEST	Vaskó 39', 61'; Tisza 80'	Report	Heffler 46', 90+1'	Stadium: Szusza Ferenc Stadion; Attendance: 3,120; Referee: Sándor Andó-Szabó

14 April 2007 24	Paks	1–1	Rákospalota	Paks
17:00 CEST	Balaskó 24' (red card) 24'	Report	Horváth 83'; Sallai (red card) 45'	Stadium: Fehérvári úti Stadion; Attendance: 1,000; Referee: József Berger

21 April 2007 25	Zalaegerszeg	4–0	Paks	Zalaegerszeg
18:00 CEST	Waltner 7'; Salamon 11' (o.g.); Józsi 23'; Dovičovič 73'	Report		Stadium: ZTE Arena; Attendance: 5,000; Referee: Szabolcs Szilasi

28 April 2007 26	Paks	1–0	Sopron	Paks
16:00 CEST	Buzás 85'	Report		Stadium: Fehérvári úti Stadion; Attendance: 1,500; Referee: Zoltán Iványi

5 May 2007 27	Pécs	0–2	Paks	Pécs
18:00 CEST	Sólyom (red card) 1'	Report	Horváth 28'; Fehér 85'	Stadium: Stadion PMFC; Attendance: 1,100; Referee: Zsolt Szabó

12 May 2007 28	Paks	1–2	Budapest Honvéd	Paks
17:30 CEST	Csehi 32'	Report	Bogdanović 24', 64'	Stadium: Fehérvári úti Stadion; Attendance: 3,000; Referee: Tamás Arany

19 May 2007 29	Paks	4–2	Vasas	Paks
18:00 CEST	Buzás 24'; Heffler 42'; Horváth 68'; Belényesi 72'	Report	Nagy 71'; Kincses 87'; Pintér (red card) 22'	Stadium: Fehérvári úti Stadion; Attendance: 3,000; Referee: Ferenc Bede

26 May 2007 30	Kaposvár	2–0	Paks	Kaposvár
18:00 CEST	Oláh 77'; Alves 84'	Report		Stadium: Rákóczi Stadion; Attendance: 2,500; Referee: Sándor Gergely

=== Hungarian Cup ===
20 September 2006 Round of 64	Budakalász	0–1	Paks	Budapest
15:00 CEST		Report	Fehér 68'	Stadium: Omszk Park; Attendance: 150; Referee: József Erdős

25 October 2006 Round of 32	Dunaújváros	2–0	Paks	Dunaújváros
13:30 CEST	Potemkin 55'; Riedl 90'	Report		Stadium: Eszperantó úti Stadion

== Statistics ==
=== Appearances and goals ===
Last updated on 2 March 2023.

No.	Pos	Nat	Player	Total		OTP Bank Liga		Hungarian Cup	
No.	Pos	Nat	Player	Apps	Goals	Apps	Goals	Apps	Goals
1	GK	(Hungary) HUN	Attila Kovács	22	-24	22	-24	0	-0
2	DF	(Hungary) HUN	Zoltán Molnár	25	1	25	1	0	0
3	DF	(Hungary) HUN	Miklós Salamon	27	0	27	0	0	0
4	DF	(Hungary) HUN	Ferenc Benedeczki	13	0	11	0	2	0
5	DF	(Hungary) HUN	Attila Fehér	9	2	7	1	2	1
6	MF	(Hungary) HUN	János Zováth	23	1	22	1	1	0
7	MF	(Hungary) HUN	Tamás Báló	21	1	19	1	2	0
8	FW	(Hungary) HUN	László Varga	21	2	19	2	2	0
9	DF	(Hungary) HUN	Tamás Csehi	11	1	11	1	0	0
10	MF	(Hungary) HUN	Tamás Kiss	28	5	26	5	2	0
13	FW	(Hungary) HUN	Dániel Böde	17	0	16	0	1	0
14	DF	(Hungary) HUN	Viktor Hanák	11	0	11	0	0	0
15	MF	(Hungary) HUN	Péter Tóth	7	0	5	0	2	0
16	MF	(Hungary) HUN	Tibor Heffler	19	5	17	5	2	0
17	FW	(Hungary) HUN	Gábor Bardi	1	0	1	0	0	0
18	MF	(Hungary) HUN	Iván Balaskó	7	1	7	1	0	0
19	MF	(Hungary) HUN	István Mészáros	17	0	15	0	2	0
20	MF	(Hungary) HUN	Attila Buzás	26	4	25	4	1	0
22	GK	(Hungary) HUN	László Bita	4	-6	3	-6	1	-0
23	DF	(Hungary) HUN	Ferenc Kóczián	10	1	10	1	0	0
26	MF	(Hungary) HUN	Gábor Tamási	23	0	23	0	0	0
28	GK	(Hungary) HUN	Péter Pokorni	5	-6	4	-4	1	-2
49	DF	(Hungary) HUN	Sándor Horváth	17	2	16	2	1	0
83	FW	(Hungary) HUN	Miklós Belényesi	28	5	27	5	1	0
99	FW	(Hungary) HUN	Ferenc Horváth	4	2	4	2	0	0
Youth players:
25	DF	(Hungary) HUN	Sándor Ambrus	4	0	2	0	2	0
82	MF	(Hungary) HUN	Zsolt Vizdár	2	0	1	0	1	0
86	GK	(Hungary) HUN	Balázs Csoknyai	0	0	0	-0	0	-0
Out to loan:
14	DF	(Hungary) HUN	Péter Barics	15	0	13	0	2	0
Players no longer at the club:
11	FW	(Hungary) HUN	Tibor Montvai	14	0	14	0	0	0

=== Top scorers ===
Includes all competitive matches. The list is sorted by shirt number when total goals are equal.

Last updated on 2 March 2023

Position	Nation	Number	Name	OTP Bank Liga	Hungarian Cup	Total
1	(Hungary)	10	Tamás Kiss	5	0	5
2	(Hungary)	83	Miklós Belényesi	5	0	5
3	(Hungary)	16	Tibor Heffler	5	0	5
4	(Hungary)	20	Attila Buzás	4	0	4
5	(Hungary)	49	Sándor Horváth	2	0	2
6	(Hungary)	8	László Varga	2	0	2
7	(Hungary)	99	Ferenc Horváth	2	0	2
8	(Hungary)	5	Attila Fehér	1	1	2
9	(Hungary)	7	Tamás Báló	1	0	1
10	(Hungary)	2	Zoltán Molnár	1	0	1
11	(Hungary)	23	Ferenc Kóczián	1	0	1
12	(Hungary)	6	János Zováth	1	0	1
13	(Hungary)	18	Iván Balaskó	1	0	1
14	(Hungary)	9	Tamás Csehi	1	0	1
/	/	/	Own Goals	2	0	2
			TOTALS	34	1	35

=== Disciplinary record ===
Includes all competitive matches. Players with 1 card or more included only.

Last updated on 2 March 2023

Position	Nation	Number	Name	OTP Bank Liga		Hungarian Cup		Total (Hu Total)	
Position	Nation	Number	Name	Booked	Sent off (straight red)	Booked	Sent off (straight red)	Booked	Sent off (straight red)
DF	(Hungary)	2	Zoltán Molnár	8	1	0	0	8 (8)	1 (1)
DF	(Hungary)	3	Miklós Salamon	2	0	0	0	2 (2)	0 (0)
DF	(Hungary)	5	Attila Fehér	4	1	0	0	4 (4)	1 (1)
MF	(Hungary)	6	János Zováth	5	0	0	0	5 (5)	0 (0)
MF	(Hungary)	7	Tamás Báló	3	0	1	0	4 (3)	0 (0)
FW	(Hungary)	8	László Varga	4	0	0	0	4 (4)	0 (0)
MF	(Hungary)	10	Tamás Kiss	3	0	0	0	3 (3)	0 (0)
FW	(Hungary)	11	Tibor Montvai	1	0	0	0	1 (1)	0 (0)
FW	(Hungary)	13	Dániel Böde	1	0	0	0	1 (1)	0 (0)
DF	(Hungary)	14	Péter Barics	3	0	0	0	3 (3)	0 (0)
MF	(Hungary)	15	Péter Tóth	2	0	1	0	3 (2)	0 (0)
MF	(Hungary)	16	Tibor Heffler	3	0	0	0	3 (3)	0 (0)
MF	(Hungary)	18	Iván Balaskó	0	1	0	0	0 (0)	1 (1)
FW	(Hungary)	19	István Mészáros	3	0	0	0	3 (3)	0 (0)
MF	(Hungary)	20	Attila Buzás	3	0	1	0	4 (3)	0 (0)
DF	(Hungary)	23	Ferenc Kóczián	3	0	0	0	3 (3)	0 (0)
DF	(Hungary)	25	Sándor Ambrus	1	0	0	0	1 (1)	0 (0)
MF	(Hungary)	26	Gábor Tamási	12	1	0	0	12 (12)	1 (1)
DF	(Hungary)	49	Sándor Horváth	2	1	0	0	2 (2)	1 (1)
FW	(Hungary)	83	Miklós Belényesi	1	0	0	0	1 (1)	0 (0)
			TOTALS	61	5	3	0	64 (61)	5 (5)

=== Clean sheets ===
Last updated on 2 March 2023

Position	Nation	Number	Name	OTP Bank Liga	Hungarian Cup	Total
1	(Hungary)	1	Attila Kovács	8	0	8
2	(Hungary)	28	Péter Pokorni	1	0	1
3	(Hungary)	22	László Bita	0	1	1
4	(Hungary)	68	Balázs Csoknyai	0	0	0
			TOTALS	9	1	10
