= Stanley Aborah =

Stanley Aborah may refer to:

- Stanley Aborah (footballer, born 1969), Ghanaian international footballer
- Stanley Aborah (footballer, born 1987), Belgian footballer of Ghanaian descent, son of the above
