= Aborah =

Aborah is a surname. Notable people with the surname include:

- Stanley Aborah (born 1969), Ghanaian footballer
- Stanley Aborah (born 1987), Ghanaian-Belgian footballer, son of the above
