= Dániel Böde =

Hungarian footballer

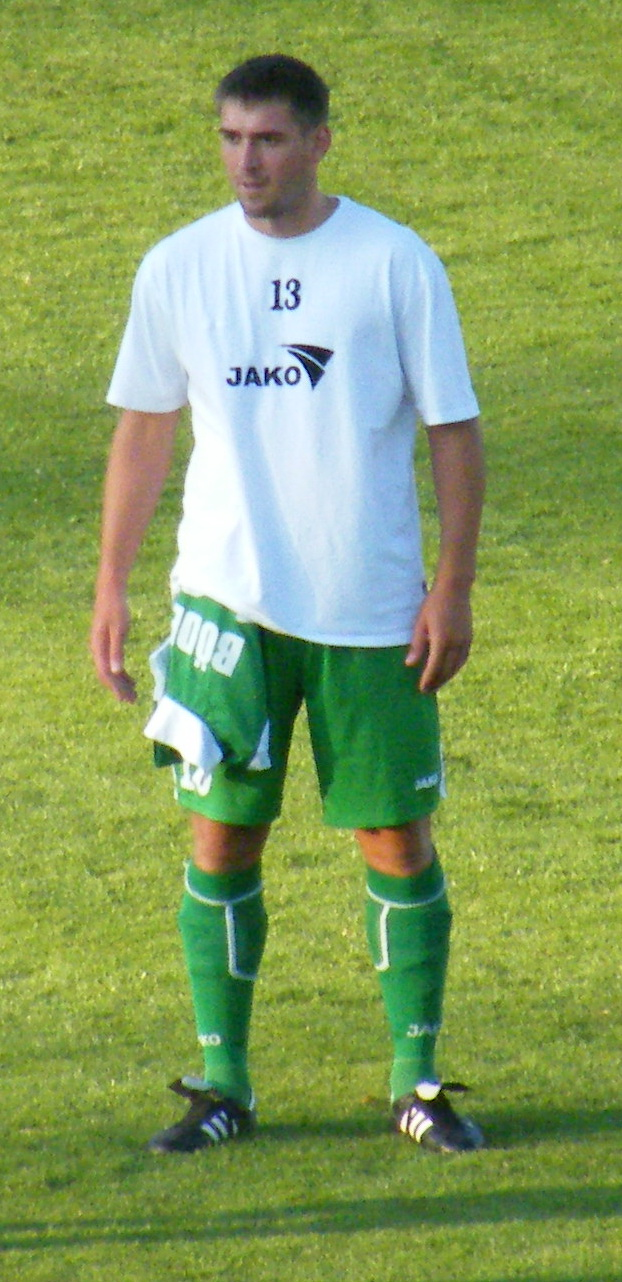
- Böde in 2009

Personal information
- Full name: Dániel Böde
- Date of birth: 24 October 1986 (age 40)
- Place of birth: Szekszárd, Hungary
- Height: 1.90 m (6 ft 3 in)
- Position: Forward

Team information
- Current team: Paks
- Number: 13

Youth career
- 1997–2005: Paks

Senior career*
Years	Team	Apps	(Gls)
2005–2012	Paks	162	(39)
2012–2019	Ferencváros	201	(89)
2019–	Paks	174	(47)
2021	Paks II	7	(4)

International career
2013–2018	Hungary	25	(5)
- * Club domestic league appearances and goals as of 30 May 2026

Dániel Böde (born 24 October 1986) is a Hungarian professional footballer who plays for Paksi FC as a forward.

== Club career ==
=== Paks ===
Böde was born in Szekszárd, Tolna County and started to play for the local neighbouring club Paksi SE. On 16 September 2006, Böde played his first Hungarian League match against Diósgyőri VTK which was won by his club by 2–1.

In 2011 Böde played a major role in Paks's international success in the 2011–12 Europa League season. Böde played his first international match in Andorra where Paks beat UE Santa Coloma 1–0. The only goal of the match came in the 14th minute when Gábor Vayer scored. At home Paks debuted with a four-goal win in Videoton FC's stadium, the Sóstói Stadion. József Magasföldi scored twice, one in each half. Dániel Böde and Norbert Heffler also contributed to the final result.

In the second round Böde's Paks faced the Norwegian Tromsø IL at home in front of 1,800 spectators, again in the Sóstói Stadion, in Székesfehérvár. The first goal of the match was scored by Magnus Andersen, with an equaliser from Hungarian Gábor Vayer. The match finished 1–1. In the second leg in Norway at the Alfheim Stadion Tamás Kiss scored to give Paks the lead in the 59th minute. Two more goals were scored by Dániel Böde and again Kiss on the night gave Paks a 4–1 aggregate win over Tromsø.

In the third round Paks were drawn against Scottish club Hearts. In the first leg in Hungary, Paks took the lead in the 32nd minute with a stunning lobbed goal by István Sipeki. In stoppage time at the end of the first half, Finnish referee Mattias Gestranius awarded Hearts a soft penalty, which was scored by Jamie Hamill to equalise and end the scoring on the night at the Sóstói Stadion.

=== Ferencváros ===
In the summer of 2012 Dániel Böde was approached by the Hungarian giant club Ferencvárosi TC and he was offered a three-year contract. In his first season with his new club, he scored 17 goals in 30 matches, and was the second top goalscorer, after Adamo Coulibaly.

On 2 April 2016, Böde became Hungarian League champion with Ferencváros after losing to Debreceni VSC 2–1 at the Nagyerdei Stadion in the 2015–16 Nemzeti Bajnokság I season.

In the 2018–19 season, Ferencváros appointed manager, Serhii Rebrov. Böde and Rebrov had a very unsteady relationship throughout the year, as Rebrov saw many other strikers as the target man for the club. In an interview with M4 Sport, Böde admitted discomfort as he said, “The club wants to sign a new foreign striker every year, but at the end, I always play.” Ferencváros ended up becoming the Hungarian Champions that season. During an interview at the Ferencváros Celebration Parade, when he was asked about his future with the club, he said, “I really have not enjoyed coming to training after crying because of my lack of action. My heart is telling me to stay, but my brain is telling me to leave.” This quote saw many as Böde saying he is ready to leave the club in search of playing time.

=== Paks ===
In the summer of 2019, Ferencváros announced that their striker, Böde Daniel was leaving the club after 7 years at the club. M4 Sport reported that Böde had made the move to his former club, Paks, due to a lack of playing time at Ferencváros.

In early September, 2022 Bode and Paksi FC mutually agreed to end his contract after the lack of playing time he received under the team's new manager Robert Waltner. On 15 May 2024, he won the 2024 Magyar Kupa Final with Paks by beating Ferencváros 2–0 at the Puskás Aréna.

In April 2025, Böde played his 500th game in the Hungarian league, becoming the fifth player to reach that milestone.

On 14 May 2025, he won the 2025 Magyar Kupa final with Paksi FC after beating Ferencvárosi TC 4–3 on penalty shoot-out.

== International career ==
Böde debuted for the Hungary national team in a friendly match against Belarus. He scored his first goal in 1–1 draw match against Turkey in the 2014 FIFA World Cup qualification. On 10 September 2013, Böde scored his second goal wearing the national team's shirt in a 5–1 victory over Estonia in the 2014 FIFA World Cup qualification match at the Puskás Ferenc Stadium.

On 8 October 2015, against Faroe Islands, Böde came off the bench at half-time when Hungary was 1–0 down. He scored twice in the 63rd and 71st minutes of the game, securing an important 2–1 win for Hungary in the UEFA Euro 2016 qualifying campaign.

On 15 November 2015, during the Euro 2016 play-offs against Norway, Böde became notorious when in the 81. minute, he tackled defender Even Hovland with what the press later called a "judo throw". He would later explain that he was trying to stop the opposing team from countering, and expressed surprise for receiving a yellow card. Minutes later his header would deflect off defender Markus Henriksen and into the net, putting Hungary 3–0 ahead in aggregate and securing the qualification.

He was selected for Hungary's Euro 2016 squad.

On 18 June 2016, he played in a 1–1 draw against Iceland at the Stade Vélodrome, Marseille.

== Career statistics ==
=== Club ===
As of matches played 14 September 2025

Appearances and goals by club, season and competition
Club	Season	League			Magyar Kupa		Ligakupa		Europe		Other		Total	
Club	Season	Division	Apps	Goals	Apps	Goals	Apps	Goals	Apps	Goals	Apps	Goals	Apps	Goals
Paks	2005–06	Nemzeti Bajnokság II	19	3	0	0	–		–		–		19	3
Paks	2006–07	Nemzeti Bajnokság I	16	0	1	0	–		–		–		17	0
Paks	2007–08	Nemzeti Bajnokság I	20	2	0	0	9	1	–		–		29	3
Paks	2008–09	Nemzeti Bajnokság I	29	1	1	0	6	0	–		–		36	1
Paks	2009–10	Nemzeti Bajnokság I	28	8	2	0	6	2	–		–		36	10
Paks	2010–11	Nemzeti Bajnokság I	24	15	3	0	6	0	–		–		33	15
Paks	2011–12	Nemzeti Bajnokság I	26	10	1	1	5	1	6 (Note: Appearances in UEFA Europa League)	3	–		38	15
Paks	Total		162	39	8	1	32	4	6	3	–		208	47
Ferencváros	2012–13	Nemzeti Bajnokság I	30	17	1	0	6	3	–		–		37	20
Ferencváros	2013–14	Nemzeti Bajnokság I	29	11	3	3	5	3	–		–		39	17
Ferencváros	2014–15	Nemzeti Bajnokság I	29	13	7	5	5	1	3	0	–		45	19
Ferencváros	2015–16	Nemzeti Bajnokság I	31	17	5	2	–		4	1	1 (Note: Appearance in Szuperkupa)	0	41	20
Ferencváros	2016–17	Nemzeti Bajnokság I	29	11	6	4	–		2 (Note: Appearances in UEFA Champions League)	1	0	0	37	16
Ferencváros	2017–18	Nemzeti Bajnokság I	30	13	1	0	–		0	0	–		31	13
Ferencváros	2018–19	Nemzeti Bajnokság I	23	7	5	2	–		2	0	–		30	9
Ferencváros	Total		201	89	28	16	16	7	11	2	1	0	257	114
Paks	2019–20	Nemzeti Bajnokság I	27	6	4	4	–		–		–		31	10
Paks	2020–21	Nemzeti Bajnokság I	25	4	2	0	–		–		–		27	4
Paks	2021–22	Nemzeti Bajnokság I	32	3	6	3	–		–		–		38	6
Paks	2022–23	Nemzeti Bajnokság I	16	5	1	1	–		–		–		17	6
Paks	2023–24	Nemzeti Bajnokság I	29	4	4	1	–		–		–		33	5
Paks	2024–25	Nemzeti Bajnokság I	32	15	2	1	–		8 (Note: Two appearances and one goal in UEFA Europa League, six appearances and two goals in UEFA Conference League)	3	–		42	19
Paks	2025–26	Nemzeti Bajnokság I	4	1	0	0	–		6 (Note: Two appearances in UEFA Europa League, four appearances in UEFA Conference League)	0	–		10	1
Paks	Total		155	38	19	10	–		14	3	–		198	51
Career total			518	166	55	27	48	11	31	8	1	0	653	212

=== International ===
As of 10 October 2017

Appearances and goals by national team and year
National team	Year	Apps	Goals
Hungary	2013	7	2
Hungary	2015	3	2
Hungary	2016	6	0
Hungary	2017	3	1
Total		19	5

Scores and results list Hungary's goal tally first, score column indicates score after each Böde goal.

List of international goals scored by Dániel Böde
No.	Date	Venue	Opponent	Score	Result	Competition
1	26 March 2013	Şükrü Saracoğlu Stadium, Istanbul	Turkey	1–1	1–1	2014 FIFA World Cup qualification
2	10 September 2013	Ferenc Puskás Stadion, Budapest	Estonia	3–0	5–1	2014 FIFA World Cup qualification
3	8 October 2015	Groupama Arena, Budapest	Faroe Islands	1–1	2–1	UEFA Euro 2016 qualification
4	8 October 2015	Groupama Arena, Budapest	Faroe Islands	2–1	2–1	UEFA Euro 2016 qualification
5	10 October 2017	Groupama Arena, Budapest	Faroe Islands	1–0	1–0	2018 FIFA World Cup qualification

== Honours ==
Paks

- Magyar Kupa: 2023–24, 2024–25
- Ligakupa: 2010–11
- Nemzeti Bajnokság II: 2005–06

Ferencváros

- Nemzeti Bajnokság I: 2015–16, 2018–19
- Magyar Kupa: 2014–15, 2015–16, 2016–17
- Ligakupa: 2012–13, 2014–15
- Szuperkupa: 2015, 2016

Individual

- Nemzeti Sport Team of the Season: 2010–11
- MVM Paks Player of the Season: 2009–10, 2010–11
- Tolna megye Footballer of the Year: 2010, 2011
- OTP Bank Liga top goalscorer (Deák Ferenc Award): 2015–16 - with 17 goals
- MLSZ Player of the Season: 2012–13
- HLSZ Player of the Season (Albert Flórián Award): 2012–13 2015–16 (shared with Zoltán Gera)
- HLSZ Team of the Season: 2014–15 2015–16
- nb1.hu Player of the Year: 2013, 2015
- Nemzeti Sport Team of the Season (6): 2012–13 Autumn Season, 2012–13 2013–14, 2014–15, 2015–16 Autumn Season, 2015–16
- rangado.hu Goal of the Season: 2015–16 - against Újpest FC
