= Miklós Belényesi =

Romanian footballer

Personal information
- Date of birth: 15 May 1983 (age 43)
- Place of birth: Marghita, Romania
- Height: 1.89 m (6 ft 2 1/2 in)
- Position: Forward

Team information
- Current team: Balmazújváros
- Number: 56

Youth career
- 1997–1999: Unirea Valea lui Mihai
- 1999–2001: Debrecen

Senior career*
Years	Team	Apps	(Gls)
2001–2003	Debrecen	6	(0)
2003–2006	Dunaújváros	15	(1)
2004–2005	→ Diósgyőr (loan)	17	(0)
2006–2008	Paks	35	(6)
2008–2009	Nyíregyháza	10	(0)
2009–2010	Szolnok	17	(1)
2010	Baumgarten	14	(3)
2010–	Balmazújváros	164	(40)
- * Club domestic league appearances and goals as of 12 August 2017

Miklós Belényesi (born 15 May 1983) is a Romanian football forward of Hungarian ethnicity. He currently plays for Balmazújvárosi FC.
