= András Gárdos =

Hungarian footballer

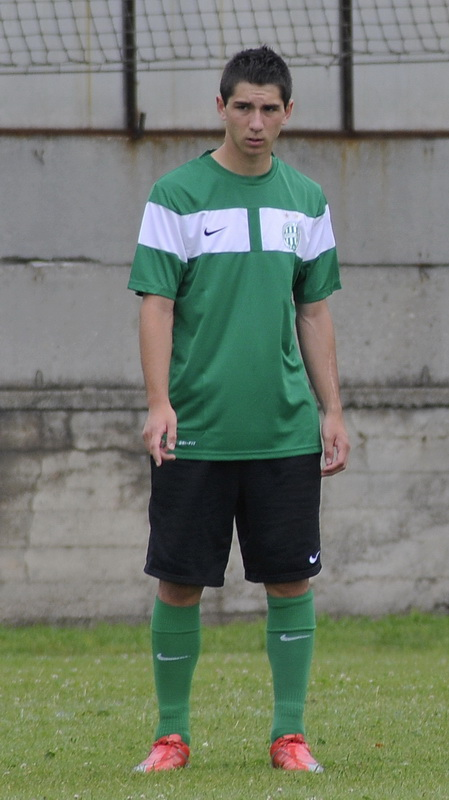

Personal information
- Date of birth: 9 January 1991 (age 35)
- Place of birth: Budapest, Hungary
- Height: 1.78 m (5 ft 10 in)
- Positions: Wide midfielder; forward

Youth career
- 2003–2007: MTK
- 2007–2010: Ferencváros

Senior career*
Years	Team	Apps	(Gls)
2010–2013	Ferencváros	2	(1)
2010–2011	→ Sheffield United (loan)	0	(0)
2013–2017	Siófok	53	(5)
2015–2016	→ Soroksár SC (loan)	25	(4)
2016–2017	→ Soroksár SC (loan)	21	(3)
2017–2021	Soroksár SC	104	(5)
- * Club domestic league appearances and goals

András Gárdos (born 9 January 1991) is a Hungarian former football player who played as a midfielder. He had a spell on loan at Sheffield United but failed to break into the English club's first team.

== Playing career ==
After coming through the youth ranks at MTK Budapest and Ferencváros. Gárdos was loaned to Fradi's sister club Sheffield United during the January 2011 transfer window.

== Career statistics ==
Appearances and goals by club, season and competition
Club	Season	League			Cup		League Cup		Europe		Total	
Club	Season	Division	Apps	Goals	Apps	Goals	Apps	Goals	Apps	Goals	Apps	Goals
Ferencváros
Ferencváros	2009–10	Nemzeti Bajnokság I	1	1	0	0	1	0	0	0	2	1
Ferencváros	2010–11	Nemzeti Bajnokság I	0	0	0	0	2	0	0	0	2	0
Ferencváros	2011–12	Nemzeti Bajnokság I	0	0	0	0	3	0	0	0	3	0
Ferencváros	2012–13	Nemzeti Bajnokság I	1	0	0	0	3	0	0	0	4	0
Ferencváros	Total		2	1	0	0	9	0	0	0	11	1
Siófok	2013–14	Nemzeti Bajnokság II	16	2	1	0	2	1	0	0	19	3
Career total			18	3	1	0	11	1	0	0	30	4

Updated to games played as of 9 March 2014.

== Honours ==
Ferencváros

- Hungarian League Cup: 2012–13
