= Arsenio Valpoort =

Dutch footballer (born 1992)

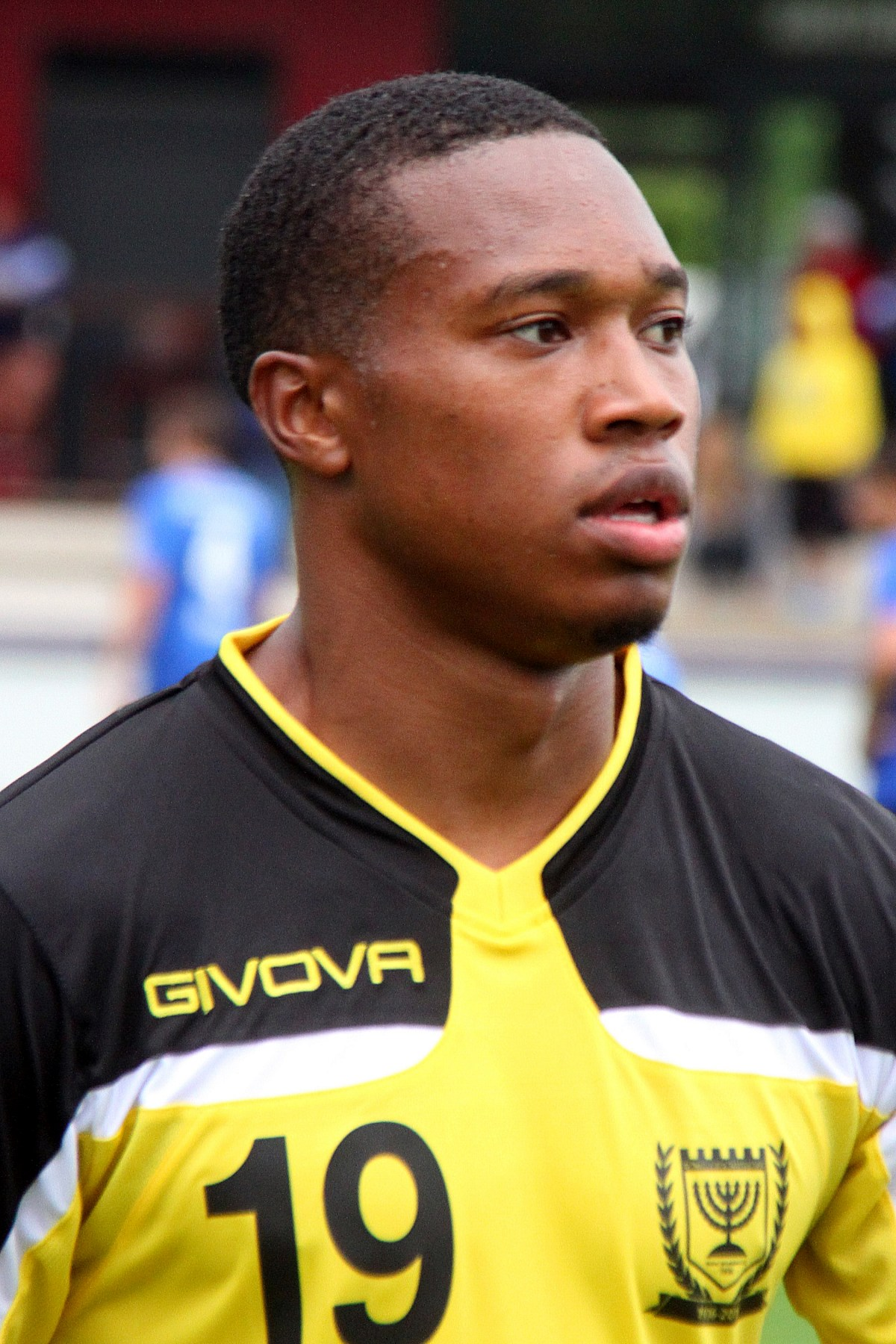
- Valpoort with Beitar Jerusalem in 2016

Personal information
- Full name: Arsenio Jermaine Cedric Valpoort
- Date of birth: 5 August 1992 (age 34)
- Place of birth: Amsterdam, Netherlands
- Height: 1.84 m (6 ft 0 in)
- Position: Winger

Team information
- Current team: TEC
- Number: 17

Youth career
- DCG
- 2006–2011: Heerenveen

Senior career*
Years	Team	Apps	(Gls)
2011–2013	Heerenveen	13	(1)
2013	→ PEC Zwolle (loan)	9	(2)
2013–2014	Ferencváros	10	(2)
2014–2016	RKC Waalwijk	49	(11)
2016–2017	Beitar Jerusalem	8	(2)
2017–2018	Almere City	40	(18)
2018	Busan IPark	10	(1)
2019	Roeselare	14	(2)
2019–2020	Excelsior	5	(0)
2020	Dordrecht	14	(1)
2021	Ermis Aradippou	15	(2)
2021	Teuta Durrës	0	(0)
2021	Egnatia Rrogozhinë	5	(0)
2022	Persebaya Surabaya	11	(1)
2022–2023	Hebar Pazardzhik	18	(3)
2023–	TEC	26	(4)

International career^{‡}
2012	Netherlands U20	4	(1)
- * Club domestic league appearances and goals as of 17:04, 19 September 2024 (UTC) ‡ National team caps and goals as of 22 March 2013

Arsenio Jermaine Cedric Valpoort (born 5 August 1992) is a Dutch professional footballer who plays as a winger for Tweede Divisie club TEC.

A youth prospect of Heerenveen, Valpoort made his first team debut in 2011. Failing to break through as a regular starter for the club, Valpoort embarked on a journeyman career, playing in Hungary, Israel, South Korea and Belgium, but achieving the most success in the Netherlands, where he had short spells with RKC Waalwijk and Almere City. In 2020, he moved to Dordrecht, his tenth club in nine years.

Valpoort is a youth international for the Netherlands, having gained four caps for the Netherlands under-20 team in which he scored one goal.

== Club career ==
=== Heerenveen ===
Valpoort joined the youth academy of Heerenveen at the same time as future professional Luciano Narsingh, and later stated that he saw the latter's breakthrough as a source of inspiration. In the youth teams he regularly showed his scoring ability, for example in the U19 league where he with 16 goals to his name finished third in the top goalscorers list. This achievement earned him a promotion to the first team where he initially signed a one-year contract with the option of an extra year in June 2011.

On 4 December 2011, Valpoort made his debut in the Eredivisie, coming on as a substitute for the injured Narsingh in a 5–1 win over AZ. On 31 January 2012, he made his debut in the KNVB Cup in a match against Vitesse. In March 2012, Heerenveen announced that the option in his contract would be triggered, keeping him at the club until June 2013. Valpoort was officially added to the Heerenveen first team in January 2012, after joining on a training camp to Portugal. During the training camp, he made two appearances in friendlies against Hannover 96 and Bayer Leverkusen. After the training camp, Valpoort made four more appearances in the Eredivisie that season and one more in the KNVB Cup, where he failed to score. In the summer break, he appeared in the UEFA Europa League matches against Norwegian club Molde, where he scored a consolation goal in the return leg to make it 2–1. Heerenveen was eliminated based on goal difference.

After a first half of the season in the 2012–13 season, in which Valpoort made five appearances, he was sent on a six-month loan deal to PEC Zwolle.

==== Loan to PEC Zwolle ====
Moving to PEC Zwolle in January indicated a new beginning for Valpoort. However, he was immediately benched for the first two matches. After his debut for Zwolle against Feyenoord, he was benched again. On 2 March, Valpoort made his debut in the starting lineup against Willem II due to an injury to Furdjel Narsingh. In that game, Valpoort made his first goal in the Eredivisie in the 57th minute on a pass from Denni Avdić.

=== Ferencváros ===
After his contract was not extended at Heerenveen, he trialled with Hungarian club Ferencváros in June 2013. After a successful trial, he signed a contract on 27 June with the club, coached by fellow Dutchman Ricardo Moniz. After the resignation of Moniz, he was demoted to the club's second team together with fellow countrymen Jack Tuijp and Mark Otten.

=== Later career ===
Valpoort signed a two-year contract with RKC Waalwijk in July 2014 after a successful trial. In February 2016, he signed a multi-year contract with Beitar Jerusalem. Valpoort scored his first ever goal for Beitar Jerusalem in an Israeli Premier League match against Maccabi Haifa.

In January 2017, Valpoort signed a one-and-a-half-year deal with Almere City. In June 2018, he moved to South Korean K League 2 club Busan IPark together with fellow Dutch player Sherjill Mac-Donald. After the club failed to win promotion to the top-tier K-League, Valpoort left and signed a two-and-a-half-year contract with Roeselare in the Belgian First Division B on 28 January 2019.

On 1 September 2019, Valpoort signed a one-year contract with Excelsior, reuniting him with his former coach, Ricardo Moniz. He made five league appearances at the club. After becoming a free agent, he moved to FC Dordrecht. On 7 January 2021, Valpoort moved to Ermis Aradippou in the Cypriot First Division. On 14 August 2021, he signed with Albanian champions Teuta Durrës. His spell at the club lasted only two weeks, as the technical staff were not satisfied with his performances. After his contract was terminated by mutual agreement, he joined league rivals Egnatia. In 2022, Valpoort moved to Indonesian club Persebaya Surabaya where he also disappointed with only one goal in 11 appearances. He left the club again in April 2022. In September 2022, Valpoort joined newly promoted Bulgarian first division club Hebar Pazardzhik.

== International career ==
Born in the Netherlands, Valpoort is of Surinamese descent. Valpoort has gained four caps for the Netherlands under-20 team, scoring one goal.
