= Gábor Bardi =

Hungarian footballer

Personal information
- Date of birth: 20 November 1978 (age 47)
- Place of birth: Budapest, Hungary
- Height: 1.90 m (6 ft 3 in)
- Position: Goalkeeper

Senior career*
Years	Team	Apps	(Gls)
1999–2000	Újpest	2	(0)
2000–2004	Zalaegerszeg	33	(0)
2002	→ Lahti (loan)	16	(0)
2004–2005	AEP Paphos	13	(0)
2005–2006	Hévíz	14	(0)
2006–2010	APOP Kinyras	57	(0)

International career
1996–1997	Hungary U14	2	(0)
- * Club domestic league appearances and goals

Gábor Bardi (born 20 November 1978) is a Hungarian former professional footballer who played as a goalkeeper.

== Honours ==
APOP Kinyras

- Cypriot Cup: 2008–09
- Cypriot Second Division: 2006–07
