= Gábor Gyömbér =

Hungarian footballer

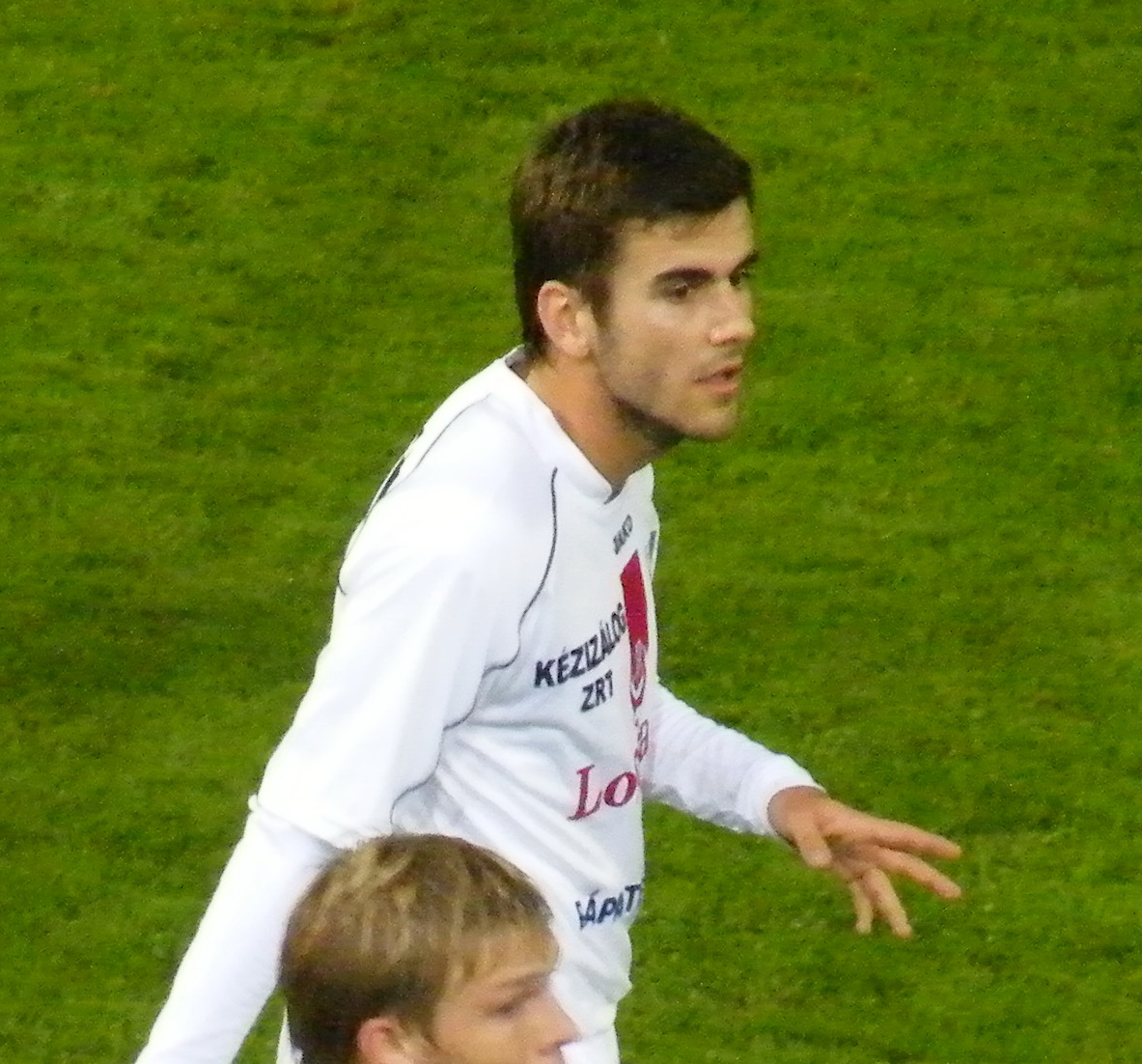

Personal information
- Date of birth: 27 February 1988 (age 38)
- Place of birth: Makó, Hungary
- Height: 1.79 m (5 ft 10 1/2 in)
- Positions: Defensive midfielder; centre back

Youth career
- 2003–2004: Makó
- 2004–2006: Ferencváros

Senior career*
Years	Team	Apps	(Gls)
2006–2007	Náutico PR		
2007–2008	Sopron	8	(0)
2008–2012	Pápa	110	(10)
2012–2017	Ferencváros	87	(7)
2017	Puskás	12	(0)
2017–2022	Soroksár	156	(18)

International career
2006–2007	Hungary U-19	6	(0)
2010	Hungary U-21	3	(0)
2013	Hungary	1	(0)
- * Club domestic league appearances and goals

Gábor Gyömbér (born 27 February 1988) is a Hungarian former professional footballer.

== Career statistics ==
Appearances and goals by club, season and competition
Club	Season	League			Cup		League Cup		Europe		Total	
Club	Season	Division	Apps	Goals	Apps	Goals	Apps	Goals	Apps	Goals	Apps	Goals
Sopron	2007–08	Nemzeti Bajnokság I	8	0	0	0	3	0	0	0	11	0
Pápa
Pápa	2007–08	Nemzeti Bajnokság II	11	1	0	0	0	0	0	0	11	1
Pápa	2008–09	Nemzeti Bajnokság II	29	4	3	0	7	3	0	0	39	7
Pápa	2009–10	Nemzeti Bajnokság I	29	3	4	0	4	0	0	0	37	3
Pápa	2010–11	Nemzeti Bajnokság I	29	2	4	0	2	0	0	0	35	2
Pápa	2011–12	Nemzeti Bajnokság I	12	0	0	0	3	0	0	0	15	0
Pápa	Total		110	10	11	0	16	3	0	0	138	13
Ferencváros
Ferencváros	2012–13	Nemzeti Bajnokság I	30	2	1	0	8	0	0	0	39	2
Ferencváros	2013–14	Nemzeti Bajnokság I	29	3	3	0	8	2	0	0	40	5
Ferencváros	2014–15	Nemzeti Bajnokság I	12	0	2	0	1	0	4	0	19	0
Ferencváros	Total		71	5	6	0	17	2	4	0	98	7
Career total			189	15	17	0	36	5	4	0	247	20

Updated to games played as of 2 December 2014.

== Honours ==
Ferencváros

- Hungarian League Cup: 2012–13
