= Akeem Adams =

Trinidadian and Tobago footballer

Personal information
- Full name: Akeem Elijah Adams
- Date of birth: 13 April 1991
- Place of birth: Point Fortin, Trinidad and Tobago
- Date of death: 30 December 2013 (aged 22)
- Place of death: Budapest, Hungary
- Height: 1.80 m (5 ft 11 in)
- Position: Defender

Senior career*
| Years | Team | Apps | (Gls) |
| 2008 | W Connection | | |
| 2009 | United Petrotrin | | |
| 2010–2011 | W Connection | | |
| 2011–2012 | T&TEC SC | | |
| 2012–2013 | Central | | |
| 2013 | Ferencváros | 6 | (0) |

International career
| 2007 | Trinidad & Tobago U17 | | |
| 2009 | Trinidad & Tobago U20 | | |
| 2008–2012 | Trinidad & Tobago | 9 | (0) |
- * Club domestic league appearances and goals

Akeem Elijah Adams (13 April 1991 – 30 December 2013) was a Trinidadian international footballer who played as a defender.

== Club career ==
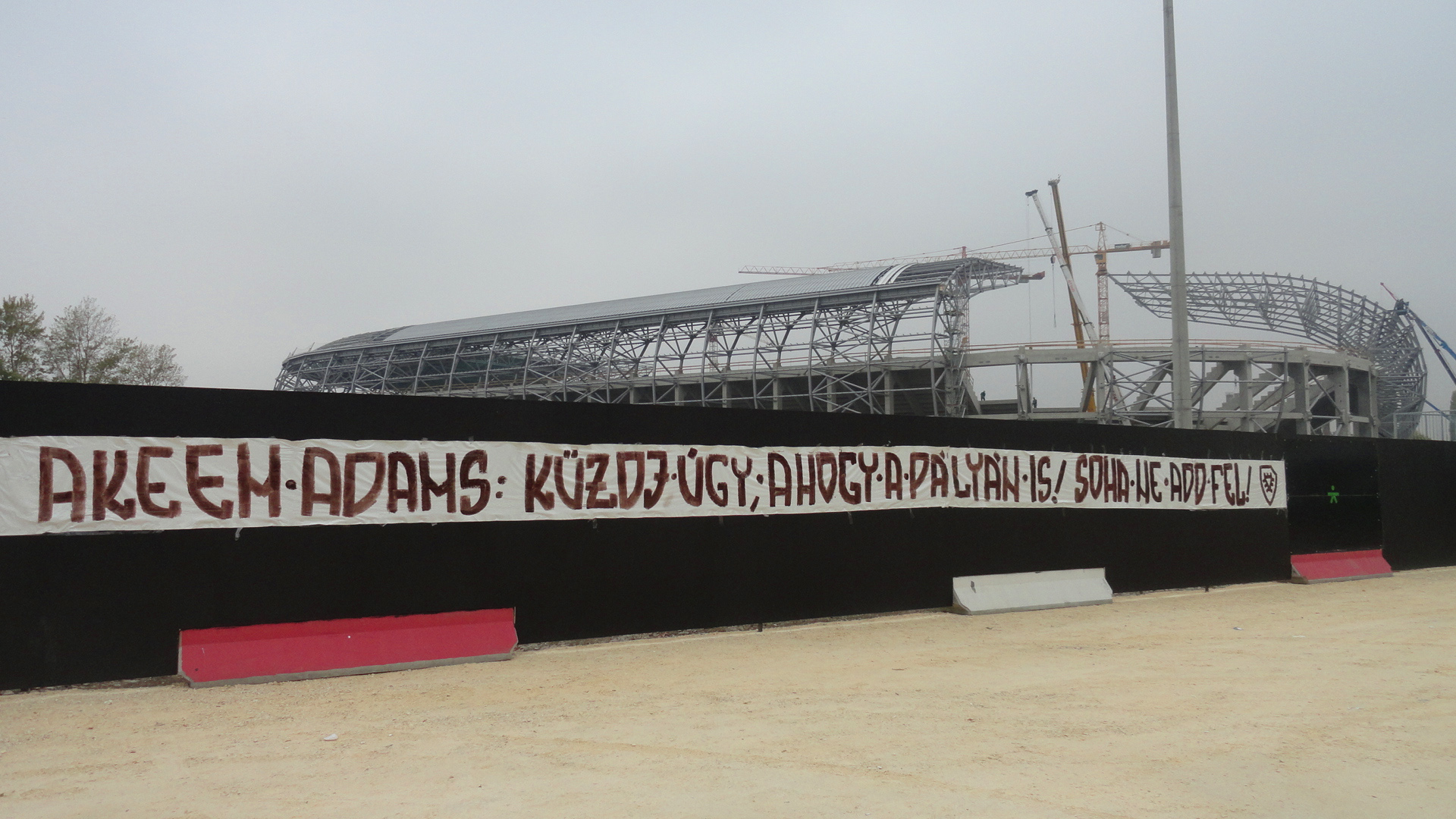
Message of the fans for hospitalized Adams at the construction site of the new Ferencváros stadium. Translation: Akeem Adams: Fight the way you do on the field! Never give up!

=== Early career ===
Adams spent his early career in Trinidad with W Connection, T&TEC SC, United Petrotrin and Central.

Akeem received a trial with Seattle Sounders FC of Major League Soccer and played the second half of an international friendly against Chivas de Guadalajara on October 12, 2010, in Seattle.

=== Ferencváros, illness and death ===
In August 2013, Akeem signed a contract with Hungarian club Ferencváros.

On 25 September 2013, Adams suffered a heart attack. His condition did not improve quickly enough and his left leg had to be amputated on October 8 in a life-saving surgery.

His doctor stated that his body was not ready for a heart transplant that would be necessary to keep him alive.

On 28 December 2013, Adams suffered a stroke while at the Városmajori Heart Clinic and fell into a coma. He died in Budapest on 30 December 2013.

== International career ==
Adams played youth international football with the Trinidad and Tobago under-17 team, participating in the 2007 FIFA U-17 World Cup and was part of the under-20 squad at 2009 FIFA U-20 World Cup. Adams made his full international debut in March 2008 at age 16, in a 1-0 victory against El Salvador.

== Personal life ==
His brother is fellow player Akini Adams.
