= László Bita =

Hungarian footballer

Personal information
- Full name: László Bita
- Date of birth: 14 August 1967 (age 59)
- Place of birth: Hungary
- Height: 1.86 m (6 ft 1 in)
- Position: Goalkeeper

Team information
- Current team: Paksi SE
- Number: 22

Youth career
- Szegedi LC

Senior career*
Years	Team	Apps	(Gls)
1988–2003	Dunaferr SE	81	(0)
1998	→ Szeged LC (loan)	17	(0)
2005–2008	Paksi SE	5	(0)
- * Club domestic league appearances and goals

László Bita (born 14 August 1967) is a Hungarian football player who currently plays for Paksi SE.

== Honours ==
Hungarian League:
Winner: 2000
UEFA Champions League:
Third qualifying round: 2000/01
UEFA Cup:
First round: 2000/01
