= Julian Jenner =

Dutch footballer (born 1984)

Personal information
- Full name: Julian Christopher Jenner
- Date of birth: 28 February 1984 (age 42)
- Place of birth: Delft, Netherlands
- Height: 1.88 m (6 ft 2 in)
- Positions: Winger; forward

Youth career
- DVV Delft
- Feyenoord
- TONEGIDO
- DHC
- NAC Breda

Senior career*
Years	Team	Apps	(Gls)
2003–2006	NAC Breda	35	(4)
2006–2009	AZ	46	(5)
2008–2009	→ Vitesse (loan)	21	(0)
2009–2012	Vitesse	28	(4)
2010	→ Rot Weiss Ahlen (loan)	11	(1)
2011	→ NAC Breda (loan)	11	(2)
2012–2014	Ferencváros	45	(9)
2014–2015	Diósgyőr	6	(0)
2015	Notts County	11	(0)
Total		214	(25)

International career
2006–2007	Netherlands U21	4	(1)
Medal record
Men's football
Representing Netherlands
UEFA European Under-21 Championship
Winner	2007 Netherlands
- * Club domestic league appearances and goals

Julian Christopher Jenner (born 28 February 1984) is a Dutch former professional footballer who played as a winger.

Known for his fast step over move, Jenner began his professional career with NAC Breda, and grew into one of the most promising wingers in the Eredivisie. He moved to AZ in 2006, where he was mostly a reserve after a good first season. A three-year stint followed with Vitesse, where he also never managed to grow into a starter and was sent on two loan spells. He then moved abroad to play in Hungary and has a short stint in England before retiring in January 2016.

A youth international, Jenner was part of the Netherlands U21 team winning gold at the 2007 UEFA European Under-21 Championship at home.

== Club career ==
=== Early career ===
Jenner started playing football at amateur club DVV Delft. Afterwards, he played for one year at Feyenoord, before returning to DVV and later playing for TONEGIDO. Jenner then moved to the youth academy of DHC, where his father was a coach. He was part of a talented team at DHC, and was invited to trials with Ajax and NAC Breda, eventually choosing to join the latter. He progressed through several youth teams there, and eventually reached the second team, Jong NAC.

=== Breakthrough ===
Towards the end of the 2003–04 season, Jenner had the opportunity to play in the first team. Due to many injuries in the squad, the then head coach Ton Lokhoff decided to add him to the bench in the match against AZ on 1 May 2004. After 83 minutes, Anouar Diba was taken off the pitch and Jenner made his professional debut. He later recalled that he was tackled harshly by AZ legend Barry van Galen, whom he later befriended. The game ended in a 2–2 draw. In the following season, Jenner was unable to make a definitive break through and he only played 5 games in which he managed to score once. In the 2005–06 season, Jenner was able to consolidate himself as a starter for NAC. He played alongside Pierre van Hooijdonk and Johan Vonlanthen in attack, among others.

In the summer of 2006, Jenner left for AZ, a team coached by Louis van Gaal, where he was seen as the replacement of Stein Huysegems who had moved to Feyenoord. In the 2006–07 season, Jenner came on as a substitute in the UEFA Cup game against Czech club Slovan Liberec. He scored the 2–2 equaliser in the 89th minute – a chip ball over goalkeeper Marek Čech – which secured AZ's advancement to the third round. The club finished the season in disappointing fashion, losing out on the Eredivisie title by three points, and losing to Ajax in the subsequent play-offs for a place in the UEFA Champions League.

=== Vitesse ===
On 14 June 2008, it was announced that Jenner signed a contract with Vitesse, together with teammate Rogier Molhoek. In his first season he made 21 appearances, partly due to a change of head coach. Where his first coach Hans Westerhof utilised Jenner as a winger, his successor Theo Bos played a system without wingers. In his second season, Jenner played four games with Vitesse and was sent on a six-month loan to Rot-Weiss Ahlen in the 2. Bundesliga in January 2010. There, Jenner played eleven games and scored one goal. When he returned to Arnhem in the summer of 2010, Jenner indicated that he was ready to stay to challenge for a place in the starting lineup. In the winter break, Jenner was found redundant by manager Albert Ferrer; on the last day of the transfer window, Vitesse sent him on loan to NAC Breda for the rest of the season. In the summer of 2011, Jenner returned to Vitesse.

=== Later career ===
In September 2012, Jenner signed with Hungarian club Ferencváros. After two years with the Hungarian club, Jenner retired from football on 9 September 2014 and announced that he would continue as a youth coach at his former club Vitesse. A month and a half later he accepted an offer from Diósgyőr and continued his active career.

In July 2015, after a week of trial, Jenner signed a one-year contract with Notts County, who had just suffered relegation to the EFL League Two. Jenner was reunited with fellow countryman Ricardo Moniz, who was also his manager at Ferencváros in the 2012–13 season. After the resignation of Moniz, he left the club at the end of January 2016 and retired from football. After his active football career, Julian Jenner married a Hungarian citizen woman. He is currently an assistant coach and personal development coach at the Hungarian football club MTK.

== International career ==
In 2007, Jenner was called up by Jong Oranje coach Foppe de Haan to be part of his squad for the 2007 UEFA European Under-21 Football Championship held in the Netherlands. Jenner participated in both of their first round group matches against Israel (1–0 win) and Portugal (2–1 win) to secure a semi final spot and to qualify for the 2008 Summer Olympics. Later the final was reached with a 1–1, 13–12 win after a penalty shootout with 32 penalty kicks taken against England. The Dutch went on to retain their 2006 title by beating Serbia 4–1 in the final.

== Style of play ==
A technically gifted winger, Jenner was famous for his step over. He learned the dribbling move by watching video tapes of Dennis Bergkamp in his childhood.

== Honours ==
Ferencváros

- Hungarian League Cup: 2012–13

Netherlands U21

- UEFA European Under-21 Championship: 2007
