= Júnior Fell =

Brazilian footballer

Personal information
- Full name: Júnior Jader Fell
- Date of birth: 10 April 1992 (age 34)
- Place of birth: Estrela, Brazil
- Height: 1.87 m (6 ft 1 1/2 in)
- Position: Centre-back

Team information
- Current team: Nacional de Muriaé

Youth career
- 2009–2010: Metropolitano
- 2010–2011: Vasco da Gama

Senior career*
Years	Team	Apps	(Gls)
2012–2013	Metropolitano	9	(0)
2013	→ Ferencváros (loan)	1	(0)
2014	Atlético Paranaense	0	(0)
2015	→ Foz do Iguaçu (loan)	0	(0)
2015	→ Inter de Lages	2	(0)
2017	Metropolitano	13	(0)
2017	→ Roasso Kumamoto (loan)	3	(0)
2018–2019	Cascavel	7	(0)
2019–2020	Juventus-SC	8	(0)
2020	Rolândia	9	(0)
2021	Glória	9	(0)
2022–	Nacional de Muriaé	0	(0)
- * Club domestic league appearances and goals as of 17:04, 31 May 2022 (UTC)

Júnior Jader Fell (born 10 April 1992 in Estrela) is a Brazilian professional footballer who plays as a centre-back for Nacional de Muriaé.

== Career ==
He began his career playing for the Under-20 sides of the Brazilian clubs Metropolitano and Vasco da Gama. His senior career started in 2013 in Metropolitano, and in that same year he played, on loan, for Ferencváros, a Hungarian League member.

In 2014, back to Metropolitano, he was elected by Globoesporte.com as one of the ten best new players in the Brazilian state leagues of that season. Later that year, in October, he signed with Atlético Paranaense.

In 2015, Júnior Fell played for Foz do Iguaçu and Inter de Lages, on loan in both cases.
