= Stanley Aborah (footballer, born 1987) =

Ghanaian-Belgian footballer

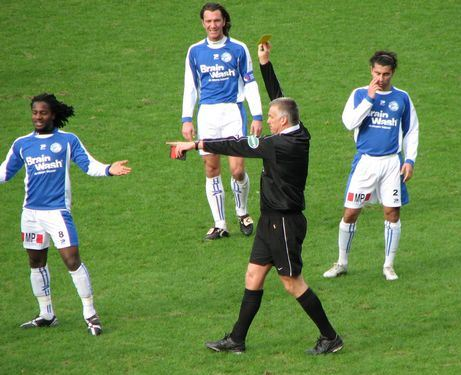
- Aborah (left) in 2008

Personal information
- Full name: Stanley Opoku Aborah
- Date of birth: 23 June 1987 (age 39)
- Place of birth: Kumasi, Ghana
- Height: 1.70 m (5 ft 7 in)
- Position: Midfielder

Youth career
- 1997–1998: Anderlecht
- 1998–1999: Cappellen
- 1999–2000: Gent
- 2000–2001: Germinal Beerschot
- 2001–2004: Jong Ajax

Senior career*
Years	Team	Apps	(Gls)
2004–2006	Ajax	4	(0)
2005–2006	→ Den Bosch (loan)	21	(3)
2006–2007	Dender	3	(0)
2007–2009	Den Bosch	36	(3)
2010	Gillingham	1	(0)
2011	Cappellen	14	(8)
2011–2012	Vitesse	13	(1)
2012–2013	Mura 05	12	(1)
2013	Ferencváros	7	(1)
2013–14	Al-Salmiya		
2015–2017	Notts County	42	(1)
2017	Portsmouth	4	(0)
2018	Waterford	24	(3)

International career
- Belgium U19
- * Club domestic league appearances and goals

Stanley Opoku Aborah (born 23 June 1987) is a former professional footballer who played as an attacking midfielder. He holds both a Ghanaian passport and a Belgian passport.

== Club career ==
=== Early career ===
Aborah was born in Kumasi, Ghana, and has had Belgian nationality since he was 10 years old. He had spells at R.S.C. Anderlecht, Cappellen, AA Gent and Germinal Beerschot before joining the Ajax youth team in 2001. His father, Stanley Aborah, Snr, a former Ghana international who played in the 1992 African Cup of Nations final, operated as a defensive midfielder and played at clubs including Germinal Ekeren (now Germinal Beerschot).

=== Ajax ===
As a former Jong Ajax captain, he stepped into the senior Ajax squad in 2004–05 and made his debut on 16 October 2004, against SC Heerenveen. Aborah came on as a substitute in the team's UEFA Champions League victory against Maccabi Tel Aviv, replacing Rafael van der Vaart in the 71st minute.

=== FC Den Bosch (loan) ===
Ajax loaned him in the 2005–06 season to second division F.C. Den Bosch to gain more experience. Aborah took part in 21 matches with this club and scored three goals.

=== F.C.V. Dender E.H. ===
On 3 January 2007, he signed for Belgian Second Division side FCV Dender EH on a free transfer.

=== Return to FC Den Bosch ===
In the summer of 2007, Aborah signed a two-year contract with his former club Den Bosch.

=== AS Trenčín ===
In 2010, he left Bosch and joined second division Slovak team AS Trenčín.

=== Gillingham ===
Aborah joined Gillingham of England's Football League Two on a one-month contract in August 2010 having spent the summer on trial with the Kent side. The deal was subsequently extended to two months. He made his Gillingham debut in a 1–0 defeat away to Bradford City on 18 September 2010, but this proved to be his only appearance for the club, as he was released from his contract on 5 October.

=== Vitesse ===
After a spell with Belgian side Cappellen, Aborah joined Eredivise side Vitesse. He made 13 league appearances scoring one goal. The club announced that while they had initiated contract renewal talks with Aborah he chose to leave the club.

=== ND Mura 05 ===
Aborah joined Slovenian side ND Mura in 2012 and made 12 league appearances.

=== Ferencváros ===
Aborah then joined Ferencvárosi TC after leaving ND Mura. During his time with the Hungarian side he featured in the 2013 League Cup final, scoring twice in a 5–1 victory over Videoton.

=== Al-Salmiyah ===
After leaving Hungary Aborah joined Kuwaiti side Al-Samiyah in September 2013. His time in Kuwait ended in a contract dispute, which prevented Aborah for playing for a year.

=== Notts County ===
In July 2015, Aborah signed for Notts County after having a trial with the Nottinghamshire side. He remained with the club until he was released on 31 January 2017.

=== Portsmouth ===
Aborah subsequently signed for Portsmouth but was released after just 4 appearances, 3 of them as a substitute, in the summer of 2017.

=== Waterford ===
After deciding to retire from football Aborah signed for League of Ireland Premier Division side Waterford in January 2018. Aborah made his debut in a 2–1 win against Derry City on 17 February 2018. Aborah retired after a season with the club.

== International career ==
Aborah has dual Ghanaian and Belgian citizenship. He was a Belgium youth (U18) international.

== Personal life ==
After retiring from football Aborah moved to Antwerp, Belgium. He opened a clothing line called Parte and worked for a telecommunications company Cask BV.
