= 2012–13 Ligakupa =

Tournament details
- Country: Hungary
- Teams: 20

Final positions
- Champions: Ferencváros
- Runners-up: Videoton

Tournament statistics
- Matches played: 73
- Goals scored: 243 (3.33 per match)

The 2012–13 Ligakupa was the sixth edition of the Hungarian League Cup, the Ligakupa.

== Group stage ==
=== Group A ===
Pos	Team	Pld	W	D	L	GF	GA	GD	Pts	Qualification	GYŐ	HON	GYI	SZO
1	Győr	6	3	2	1	18	8	+10	11	Advance to knockout phase	—	2–2	5–1	5–1
2	Honvéd	6	3	2	1	13	9	+4	11	Advance to knockout phase	0–3	—	4–0	2–0
3	Gyirmót	6	1	2	3	11	18	−7	5		2–2	1–2	—	4–2
4	Haladás	6	1	2	3	11	18	−7	5		2–1	3–3	3–3	—

Rules for classification: 1) points; 2) goal difference; 3) number of goals scored.

=== Group B ===
Pos	Team	Pld	W	D	L	GF	GA	GD	Pts	Qualification	PÉC	PAK	VAS	SIÓ
1	Pécs	6	3	2	1	11	6	+5	11	Advance to knockout phase	—	2–0	2–1	1–1
2	Paks	6	2	2	2	7	6	+1	8		2–1	—	4–1	1–1
3	Vasas	6	2	1	3	5	9	−4	7		1–1	1–0	—	0–2
4	Siófok	6	1	3	2	5	7	−2	6		1–4	0–0	0–1	—

Rules for classification: 1) points; 2) goal difference; 3) number of goals scored.

=== Group C ===
Pos	Team	Pld	W	D	L	GF	GA	GD	Pts	Qualification	VID	PÁP	KAP	ZTE
1	Videoton	6	4	1	1	9	3	+6	13	Advance to knockout phase	—	2–0	1–0	2–0
2	Pápa	6	4	0	2	9	8	+1	12	Advance to knockout phase	2–1	—	2–1	2–1
3	Kaposvár	6	1	2	3	6	8	−2	5		1–1	2–1	—	1–1
4	Zalaegerszeg	6	1	1	4	5	10	−5	4		0–2	1–2	2–1	—

Rules for classification: 1) points; 2) goal difference; 3) number of goals scored.

=== Group D ===
Pos	Team	Pld	W	D	L	GF	GA	GD	Pts	Qualification	FTC	KEC	MTK	SZL
1	Ferencváros	6	5	1	0	14	4	+10	16	Advance to knockout phase	—	2–1	2–0	2–1
2	Kecskemét	6	2	3	1	12	7	+5	9		2–2	—	1–1	5–0
3	MTK	6	1	2	3	5	7	−2	5		0–1	0–1	—	4–2
4	Szolnok	6	0	2	4	5	18	−13	2		0–5	2–2	0–0	—

Rules for classification: 1) points; 2) goal difference; 3) number of goals scored.

=== Group E ===
Pos	Team	Pld	W	D	L	GF	GA	GD	Pts	Qualification	DEB	EGE	DIÓ	UTE
1	Debrecen	6	4	0	2	13	6	+7	12	Advance to knockout phase	—	0–1	5–2	3–0
2	Eger	6	4	0	2	13	9	+4	12	Advance to knockout phase	1–3	—	2–1	4–0
3	Diósgyőr	6	2	0	4	11	13	−2	6		0–1	3–0	—	3–2
4	Újpest	6	2	0	4	9	18	−9	6		2–1	2–5	3–2	—

Rules for classification: 1) points; 2) goal difference; 3) number of goals scored.

== Knockout phase ==
Quarter-finals
Eger	4	3	7
Győr	1	3	4
Ferencváros (a.e.t.) (a)	3	2	5
Pápa	1	4	5
Videoton	1	0	1
Debrecen	0	0	0
Pécs	3	3	6
Honvéd	2	3	5

Semi-finals
Eger	1	0	1
Ferencváros	3	1	4
Videoton	3	2	5
Pécs	1	1	2

Final
Ferencváros	5
Videoton	1

=== Quarter-finals ===
The five winners and 3 seconds placed of the previous round were drawn into five group matches. The winners on aggregate advanced to the next round. The first leg were played on 20 February, the second leg were played on 6 March 2012.

Team 1	Agg.	Team 2	1st leg	2nd leg
Eger	7–4	Győr	4–1	3–3
Ferencváros	5–5 (a)	Pápa	3–1	2–4 (a.e.t.)
Videoton	1–0	Debrecen	1–0	0–0
Pécs	6–5	Honvéd	3–2	3–3

=== Semi-finals ===
The first leg were played on 20 and 21 March, the second leg were played on 23 and 24 March 2012.

Team 1	Agg.	Team 2	1st leg	2nd leg
Eger	1–4	Ferencváros	1–3	0–1
Videoton	5–2	Pécs	3–1	2–1

=== Final ===
24 April 2013
17:30

Ferencváros	5–1	Videoton
Čukić 21'; Jenner 27'; Aborah 39', 70'; Somália 75'	Report	Mitrović 23'

Sóstói Stadion, Székesfehérvár
Attendance: 6,200
Referee: Ádám Farkas
