= 2015–16 Videoton FC season =

Videoton
2015–16 season
- Chairman: István Garancsi
- Manager: Bernard Casoni (until 19 August); Tamás Pető (caretaker, from 9 August to 6 October); Ferenc Horváth (from 6 October)
- Stadium: Sóstói Stadion (until 14 December 2015); Pancho Aréna (from 14 December 2015)
- Nemzeti Bajnokság I: 2nd
- Magyar Kupa: Quarter-finals
- Szuperkupa: Runners-up
- UEFA Champions League: Third qualifying round
- UEFA Europa League: Play-off round
- Top goalscorer: League: Ádám Gyurcsó (7); All: Ádám Gyurcsó (9)
- Highest home attendance: 5,020 vs Ferencváros (8 August 2015); Nemzeti Bajnokság I
- Lowest home attendance: 1,006 vs Debrecen (5 April 2016); Nemzeti Bajnokság I
- Average home league attendance: 1,988
- Biggest win: 5–0 vs MTK Budapest (H) (23 April 2016); Nemzeti Bajnokság I
- Biggest defeat: 0–3 vs Ferencváros (N) (5 July 2015); Szuperkupa; 0–3 vs Lech Poznań (A) (20 August 2015); UEFA Europa League

The 2015–16 season was Videoton Football Club's 47th competitive season, 16th consecutive season in the Nemzeti Bajnokság I and 73rd year in existence as a football club. In addition to the domestic league, Videoton participated in this season's editions of the Magyar Kupa, Szuperkupa, UEFA Champions League and UEFA Europa League.

Before the season Videoton's manager Joan Carrillo contract got terminated and replaced with by Bernard Casoni. In the league after ten games, the defending champions won only three times and lost seven. Videoton performed as poorly as in the 1998–99 season, the one which led to relegation.

In European competitions, the team beat The New Saints in the second qualifying round, but knocked out one round later by BATE Borisov. Lech Poznań crushed the team's hopes to join the group stages of the second tier of European competitions in the play-off round due to lost twice to them.

After the unfortunate European campaign and losing to rivals, Ferencváros 3–0 in the Szuperkupa, Casoni got sacked. As a caretaker, Tamás Pető was appointed until 6 October, and replaced with Ferenc Horváth who stayed until the end of season. Under his management, Videoton made it the Quarter-finals in the domestic cup and finishing runner's up in the league.

== First team squad ==
Note: Flags indicate national team as defined under FIFA eligibility rules; some limited exceptions apply. Players may hold more than one non-FIFA nationality.

No.	Pos.	Nation	Player
2	DF	FRA	Loïc Négo
3	DF	BRA	Paulo Vinícius (vice-captain)
5	MF	HUN	Tibor Heffler
6	DF	HUN	András Fejes
8	MF	HUN	Zsolt Pölöskei
9	FW	HUN	Róbert Feczesin
10	MF	HUN	István Kovács
14	FW	HUN	Gergely Rudolf
15	FW	HUN	Viktor Sejben
16	MF	POR	Filipe Oliveira
17	FW	HUN	Máté Pátkai
18	DF	HUN	Ádám Lang

No.	Pos.	Nation	Player
19	FW	HUN	Patrik Tischler
22	DF	CPV	Stopira
23	DF	HUN	Roland Juhász (captain)
27	MF	GUI	Alhassane Soumah
30	DF	HUN	Roland Szolnoki
33	MF	CRO	Dinko Trebotić
44	GK	SRB	Branislav Danilović
46	MF	HUN	Ádám Simon
74	GK	HUN	Ádám Kovácsik
88	MF	HUN	Zsolt Haraszti
99	FW	BIH	Asmir Suljić

== Transfers ==
=== Summer ===
In: Note: Flags indicate national team as defined under FIFA eligibility rules; some limited exceptions apply. Players may hold more than one non-FIFA nationality.

No.	Pos.	Nation	Player
2	DF	FRA	Loïc Négo (from (England) Charlton Athletic)
3	DF	HUN	Márton Lorentz (loan return from Puskás Akadémia)
8	MF	HUN	Zsolt Pölöskei (from MTK Budapest)
8	MF	HUN	László Kleinheisler (loan return from Puskás Akadémia)
11	FW	HUN	Tamás Koltai (from Győr)
12	GK	SVK	Tomáš Tujvel (loan return from Kecskemét)
14	FW	HUN	Gergely Rudolf (from Győr)
17	MF	HUN	Máté Pátkai (from Győr)
18	DF	HUN	Ádám Lang (from Győr)
18	MF	HUN	Máté Papp (loan return from Dunaújváros)
20	FW	HUN	Donát Zsótér (loan return from Puskás Akadémia)
21	DF	HUN	Adrián Szekeres (loan return from Dunaújváros)
26	MF	HUN	Balázs Tóth (loan return from Puskás Akadémia)
27	MF	GUI	Alhassane Soumah (on loan from (Italy) Juventus)
42	GK	HUN	Péter Gábor (from Videoton II)
44	GK	SRB	Branislav Danilović (on loan from Puskás Akadémia)
74	GK	HUN	Ádám Kovácsik (from (Italy) Reggina)
99	FW	BIH	Asmir Suljić (from Újpest)

Out: Note: Flags indicate national team as defined under FIFA eligibility rules; some limited exceptions apply. Players may hold more than one non-FIFA nationality.

No.	Pos.	Nation	Player
1	GK	ESP	Juan Calatayud (to (India) Atlético de Kolkata)
2	DF	ESP	Álvaro Brachi (End of Contract)
3	DF	HUN	Márton Lorentz (on loan to Dunaújváros)
4	DF	NED	Kees Luijckx (to (Denmark) Sønderjyske)
11	MF	HUN	György Sándor (to (Australia) Perth Glory)
11	FW	HUN	Tamás Koltai (loan to Paks)
12	GK	SVK	Tomáš Tujvel (on loan to Dunajská Streda)
12	MF	ESA	Arturo Álvarez (End of Contract)
14	DF	MAR	Sofian Chakla (to (Spain) La Roda)
14	MF	HUN	Márk Barcsay (loan return to Puskás Akadémia)
17	FW	HUN	Nemanja Nikolić (to (Poland) Legia Warsaw)
18	MF	HUN	Máté Papp (to Sopron)
20	FW	HUN	Donát Zsótér (on loan to Puskás Akadémia)
26	MF	HUN	Balázs Tóth (Retired)
31	GK	HUN	Tamás Horváth (loan to Puskás Akadémia)
31	DF	MTQ	Rémi Maréval (Retired)
37	FW	HUN	Dániel Havasi (on loan to Dunaújváros)
64	DF	HUN	Gergő Kocsis (to MTK Budapest)
77	MF	CRO	Marko Pajač (to (Slovenia) Celje)

=== Winter ===
In: Note: Flags indicate national team as defined under FIFA eligibility rules; some limited exceptions apply. Players may hold more than one non-FIFA nationality.

No.	Pos.	Nation	Player
19	FW	HUN	Patrik Tischler (on loan from Puskás Akadémia)
31	GK	HUN	Tamás Horváth (loan return from Puskás Akadémia)
35	FW	HUN	Dominique Vallejos (loan return from BKV Előre)
36	FW	HUN	Patrik Paudits (from Videoton II)
37	FW	HUN	Dániel Havasi (loan return from Dunaújváros)
88	FW	HUN	Zsolt Haraszti (from Ferencváros)

Out: Note: Flags indicate national team as defined under FIFA eligibility rules; some limited exceptions apply. Players may hold more than one non-FIFA nationality.

No.	Pos.	Nation	Player
1	GK	SRB	Filip Pajović (on loan to Puskás Akadémia)
2	DF	HUN	Dénes Baksa (on loan to Siófok)
7	FW	HUN	Ádám Gyurcsó (to (Poland) Pogoń Szczecin)
8	MF	HUN	László Kleinheisler (to (Germany) Werder Bremen)
11	MF	HUN	Bence Bognár (on loan to Siófok)
19	FW	MKD	Mirko Ivanovski (to (Turkey) Boluspor)
21	DF	HUN	Adrián Szekeres (to Gyirmót)
31	GK	HUN	Tamás Horváth (on loan to Mezőkövesd)
36	FW	HUN	Patrik Paudits (on loan to Siófok)
42	GK	HUN	Péter Gábor (on loan to Siófok)

== Competitions ==
=== Overview ===
Competition	First match	Last match	Starting round	Final position	Record							
Competition	First match	Last match	Starting round	Final position	Pld	W	D	L	GF	GA	GD	Win %
Nemzeti Bajnokság I	19 July 2015	30 April 2016	Matchday 1	2nd	33	17	4	12	42	29	+13	51.52
Magyar Kupa	14 October 2015	2 March 2016	Round of 32	Quarter-finals	5	3	1	1	6	3	+3	60.00
Szuperkupa	5 July 2015		Final	Runners-up	1	0	0	1	0	3	−3	0.00
UEFA Champions League	14 July 2015	5 August 2015	Second qualifying round	Third qualifying round	4	1	2	1	3	3	+0	25.00
UEFA Europa League	20 August 2015	27 August 2015	Play-off round	Play-off round	2	0	0	2	0	4	−4	0.00
Total					45	21	7	17	51	42	+9	46.67

Source: Competitions

=== Nemzeti Bajnokság I ===
==== League table ====
Pos	Team	Pld	W	D	L	GF	GA	GD	Pts	Qualification or relegation
1	Ferencváros (C)	33	24	4	5	69	23	+46	76	Qualification for the Champions League second qualifying round
2	Videoton	33	17	4	12	42	29	+13	55	Qualification for the Europa League first qualifying round (Note: Since the winners of the 2015–16 Magyar Kupa, Ferencváros, qualified for European competition based on league position, the spot awarded to the cup winners (Europa League first qualifying round) was passed to the fourth-placed team.)
3	Debrecen	33	14	11	8	48	34	+14	53	Qualification for the Europa League first qualifying round
4	MTK Budapest	33	14	9	10	39	37	+2	51	Qualification for the Europa League first qualifying round
5	Haladás	33	13	11	9	33	37	−4	50	

Source: Soccerway
Rules for classification: 1) Points; 2) Matches won; 3) Goal difference; 4) Goals scored; 5) Head-to-head points; 6) Head-to-head goal difference; 7) Head-to-head away goals scored; 8) Fairplay; 9) Draw.
(C) Champions

==== Results summary ====
Overall								Home						Away					
Pld	W	D	L	GF	GA	GD	Pts	W	D	L	GF	GA	GD	W	D	L	GF	GA	GD
33	17	4	12	42	29	+13	55	12	3	2	30	12	+18	5	1	10	12	17	−5

Source: Hungarian Football Federation

==== Results by round ====
Round	1	2	3	4	5	6	7	8	9	10	11	12	13	14	15	16	17	18	19	20	21	22	23	24	25	26	27	28	29	30	31	32	33
Ground	A	H	A	H	A	A	H	A	H	A	H	H	A	H	A	H	H	A	H	A	H	A	H	A	H	A	H	H	H	A	H	H	A
Result	L	L	W	L	L	L	W	L	W	L	W	W	L	W	L	W	W	W	W	L	D	W	W	L	D	D	D	L	W	W	W	W	W
Position	11	10	9	10	10	11	11	11	10	11	7	7	7	6	7	7	7	5	3	6	6	5	3	4	5	4	5	5	5	4	3	2	2

Source: Matches
A = Away; H = Home; W = Win; D = Draw; L = Loss

==== Matches ====
18 July 2015 1	Budapest Honvéd	1–0	Videoton	Budapest
20:30 CEST (UTC+2)	Botka (yellow card) 46'; Kamber (yellow card) 58'; Youla 84'	Report	Juhász (yellow card) 49'; Lang (red card) 83'; Szolnoki (yellow card) 86'	Stadium: Bozsik József Stadion; Attendance: 2,020; Referee: István Vad

25 July 2015 2	Videoton	0–1	Haladás	Székesfehérvár
18:00 CEST (UTC+2)	Maréval (yellow card) 82'; Soumah (yellow card) 90+3'	Report	Bošnjak (yellow card) 42'; Juhász 49' (o.g.); P. Nagy (yellow card) 71'; Wils (yellow card) 76'; Martínez (yellow card) 88'	Stadium: Sóstói Stadion; Attendance: 1,598; Referee: Péter Solymosi

1 August 2015 3	Diósgyőr	1–2	Videoton	Miskolc
18:00 CEST (UTC+2)	Koman 9' (pen.), (yellow card) 61'; Nemes (yellow card) 41'; Okuka (yellow card) 44'; Bacsa (yellow card) 70'	Report	Vinícius (yellow card) 9'; Simon (red card) 48'; Maréval (yellow card) 61'; Pátkai (yellow card) 69', (goal) 90+5'; Oliveira 90+3'	Stadium: Diósgyőri Stadion; Attendance: 4,264; Referee: Zoltán Iványi

8 August 2015 4	Videoton	1–3	Ferencváros	Székesfehérvár
20:30 CEST (UTC+2)	Vinícius (red card) 36'; Szolnoki (yellow card) 45'; Ivanovski 50'	Report	Heffler 11' (o.g.); Hajnal (yellow card) 12'; Böde 57', 82'	Stadium: Sóstói Stadion; Attendance: 5,020; Referee: Sándor Andó-Szabó

15 August 2015 5	Vasas	2–1	Videoton	Budapest
18:00 CEST (UTC+2)	Pajović (yellow card) 17'; Novák 48'; Remili 76'	Report	Heffler (yellow card) 28'; Ivanovski (yellow card) 42'; Kovács 45+2', (yellow card) 49'	Stadium: Illovszky Rudolf Stadion; Attendance: 2,500; Referee: Péter Solymosi

23 August 2015 6	MTK Budapest	1–0	Videoton	Budapest
18:00 CEST (UTC+2)	Torghelle (yellow card) 46'; Grgić (yellow card) 48'; Vass (yellow card) 58'; Gera (yellow card) 62'; Kanta 81' (pen.)	Report	Pátkai (yellow card) 36'; Simon (yellow card) 59'; Juhász (red card) 90+3'	Stadium: Illovszky Rudolf Stadion; Attendance: 1,117; Referee: Viktor Kassai

30 August 2015 7	Videoton	1–0	Debrecen	Székesfehérvár
19:00 CEST (UTC+2)	Oliveira (yellow card) 43', (goal) 90+1'; Heffler (yellow card) 48'; Kovács (yellow card) 88'; Danilović (yellow card) 90+2'	Report	Varga (yellow card) 71'; Bódi (yellow card) 85'	Stadium: Sóstói Stadion; Attendance: 2,147; Referee: István Vad

12 September 2015 8	Paks	2–0	Videoton	Paks
18:00 CEST (UTC+2)	Vinícius 28' (o.g.); Papp (yellow card) 48'; Szabó (red card) 50'; Szakály 58' (pen.), (yellow card) 90+3'; Bartha (yellow card) 72'; Lenzsér (yellow card) 73'	Report	Danilović (yellow card) 9'; Suljić (yellow card) 48'; Oliveira (yellow card) 49'; Gyurcsó (yellow card) 83'	Stadium: Fehérvári úti Stadion; Attendance: 1,700; Referee: Zoltán Iványi

19 September 2015 9	Videoton	3–0	Újpest	Székesfehérvár
20:30 CEST (UTC+2)	Gyurcsó 58' (pen.), 86'; Kovács 90'	Report	Sallói (yellow card) 28'; Mohl (yellow card) 58'; Heris (red card) 72'	Stadium: Sóstói Stadion; Attendance: 2,589; Referee: Péter Solymosi

26 September 2015 10	Békéscsaba	2–0	Videoton	Békéscsaba
18:00 CEST (UTC+2)	Viczián 23'; Bényei (yellow card) 38'; Borbély (yellow card) 40'; Calvente 45'	Report	Simon (yellow card) 32'; Vinícius (yellow card) 34'	Stadium: Stadion Kórház utcai Attendance: 1,312; Referee: Mihály Fábián

3 October 2015 11	Videoton	3–2	Puskás Akadémia	Székesfehérvár
18:00 CEST (UTC+2)	Pölöskei (yellow card) 10'; Gyurcsó 34', 79'; Suljić 50'; Pátkai (yellow card) 52'; Stopira (yellow card) 65'	Report	Lencse 6'; Pekár 22'; Bačelić-Grgić (yellow card) 58'; Márkvárt (yellow card) 69'; Fiola (red card) 84'	Stadium: Sóstói Stadion; Attendance: 1,745; Referee: József Erdős

17 October 2015 12	Videoton	3–0	Budapest Honvéd	Székesfehérvár
18:00 CEST (UTC+2)	Feczesin 34', (yellow card) 35'; Gyurcsó 45+1'; Szolnoki (yellow card) 61'; Danilović (yellow card) 61'; Juhász 74', (yellow card) 81'	Report	Vernes (yellow card) 9'; Gazdag (yellow card) 39'; Youla (yellow card) 61'	Stadium: Sóstói Stadion; Attendance: 2,290; Referee: Zoltán Iványi

24 October 2015 13	Haladás	1–0	Videoton	Szombathely
17:30 CEST (UTC+2)	Gaál 24'; Bošnjak (yellow card) 52'; Ugrai (yellow card) 90+3'	Report	Oliveira (yellow card) 39'; Simon (yellow card) 50'; Négo (yellow card) 52'; Pátkai (yellow card) 89'	Stadium: Rohonci Street Stadium; Attendance: 4,200; Referee: Viktor Kassai

31 October 2015 14	Videoton	2–1	Diósgyőr	Székesfehérvár
18:00 CET (UTC+1)	Juhász (yellow card) 45'; Sejben 47'; Négo (yellow card) 49', (goal) 70'; Kovács (yellow card) 50'; Suljić (yellow card) 51'	Report	Grumić 44'; Egerszegi (yellow card) 48'; Lipták (yellow card) 48'; Okuka (yellow card) 49'; Eperjesi (yellow card) 65'	Stadium: Sóstói Stadion; Attendance: 2,409; Referee: István Vad

2 December 2015 15	Ferencváros	1–0	Videoton	Budapest
18:30 CET (UTC+1)	Nalepa (yellow card) 21'; Lamah (yellow card) 29'; Ramírez (yellow card) 53'; Radó 62'; Á. Nagy (yellow card) 83'	Report	Gyurcsó (yellow card) 26'; Oliveira (yellow card) 26'; Pátkai (yellow card) 48'; Kovács (yellow card) 55'; Szolnoki (yellow card) 87'; Soumah (yellow card) 90'	Stadium: Groupama Arena; Attendance: 5,379; Referee: Péter Solymosi

21 November 2015 16	Videoton	2–0	Vasas	Székesfehérvár
15:30 CET (UTC+1)	Kovács 10'; Gyurcsó 33'; Pátkai (yellow card) 63'	Report	Adamović (yellow card) 31'; Vukasović (yellow card) 74'	Stadium: Sóstói Stadion; Attendance: 1,615; Referee: Csaba Pintér

28 November 2015 17	Videoton	1–0	MTK Budapest	Székesfehérvár
15:30 CET (UTC+1)	Suljić (yellow card) 32'; Oliveira (yellow card) 77', (goal) 82'; Szolnoki (yellow card) 84'; Juhász (yellow card) 86'; Vinícius (yellow card) 87'; Pölöskei (yellow card) 90+1'; Feczesin (yellow card) 90+3'	Report	Gera (red card) 72'; Vadnai (yellow card) 89'	Stadium: Sóstói Stadion; Attendance: 1,314; Referee: Tamás Bognár

5 December 2015 18	Debrecen	1–2	Videoton	Debrecen
18:30 CET (UTC+1)	Korhut (yellow card) 10', (goal) 62'; Sidibe (yellow card) 25'; Zsidai (yellow card) 59'	Report	Gyurcsó 31'; Feczesin (yellow card) 44'; Kovács 69'	Stadium: Nagyerdei Stadion; Attendance: 1,656; Referee: István Vad

12 December 2015 19	Videoton	1–0	Paks	Székesfehérvár
15:30 CET (UTC+1)	Géresi 81', (yellow card) 88'	Report	Hahn (yellow card) 40'; Kesztyűs (yellow card) 89'	Stadium: Sóstói Stadion; Attendance: 2,531; Referee: Sándor Andó-Szabó

13 February 2016 20	Újpest	1–0	Videoton	Budapest
18:00 CET (UTC+1)	Heris (yellow card) 56'; Hazard 69'; Litauszki (yellow card) 83'	Report	Oliveira (yellow card) 77'; Fejes (yellow card) 87'	Stadium: Szusza Ferenc Stadium; Attendance: 2,564; Referee: Viktor Kassai

20 February 2016 21	Videoton	1–1	Békéscsaba	Felcsút
15:30 CET (UTC+1)	Vaskó 18' (o.g.); Juhász (yellow card) 24'; Pátkai (yellow card) 83'; Sejben (yellow card) 90+1'	Report	Laczkó 10', (red card) 90+4'; Piermayr (yellow card) 14'; Poleksić (yellow card) 61'; Damjanović (yellow card) 64'; Calvente (yellow card) 80'	Stadium: Pancho Aréna; Attendance: 1,763; Referee: Szabolcs Szilasi

27 February 2016 22	Puskás Akadémia	0–1	Videoton	Felcsút
15:30 CET (UTC+1)	Bačelić-Grgić (yellow card) 38'; Polonkai (yellow card) 52'; Pauljević (red card) 76'; Sallai (yellow card) 87'	Report	Rudolf (yellow card) 18'; Kovács (yellow card) 63'; Haraszti (yellow card) 86'; Feczesin 90+4'	Stadium: Pancho Aréna; Attendance: 1,756; Referee: Zoltán Iványi

5 March 2016 23	Videoton	2–1	Haladás	Felcsút
18:00 CET (UTC+1)	Simon 10'; Oliveira (yellow card) 62'; Feczesin 71' (pen.)	Report	Iszlai (yellow card) 13'; Kovács (yellow card) 26'; Popin 66'; Gaál (yellow card) 73'	Stadium: Pancho Aréna; Attendance: 1,298; Referee: István Vad

9 March 2016 24	Diósgyőr	2–1	Videoton	Miskolc
18:00 CET (UTC+1)	Barczi 33'; Tamás (yellow card) 72'; Novothny (yellow card) 87', (goal) 90+2' (pen.)	Report	Pátkai (yellow card) 15'; Suljić (yellow card) 35'; Négo 43'; Oliveira (yellow card) 57'; Haraszti (yellow card) 60'; Kovács (yellow card) 73'	Stadium: Diósgyőri Stadion; Attendance: 3,262; Referee: Péter Solymosi

12 March 2016 25	Videoton	1–1	Békéscsaba	Felcsút
15:30 CET (UTC+1)	Stopira (yellow card) 50', (goal) 57'; Juhász (yellow card) 67'	Report	Laczkó 9'; Piermayr (yellow card) 59'; Bényei (yellow card) 66'; Poleksić (yellow card) 79'; Damjanović (red card) 90+4'	Stadium: Pancho Aréna; Attendance: 1,164; Referee: Ádám Németh

19 March 2016 26	Puskás Akadémia	0–0	Videoton	Felcsút
15:30 CET (UTC+1)	Zsidai (yellow card) 31'; Márkvárt (yellow card) 82'; Mészáros (yellow card) 90+4'	Report	Simon (yellow card) 26'; Oliveira (yellow card) 32'; Pátkai (yellow card) 65'	Stadium: Pancho Aréna; Attendance: 1,718; Referee: Péter Solymosi

9 April 2016 27	Videoton	2–2	Vasas	Felcsút
18:00 CEST (UTC+2)	Pátkai (yellow card) 33'; Juhász (yellow card) 63'; Suljić (yellow card) 73'; Géresi 74'; Négo 78', (yellow card) 90+4'	Report	Remili 14', 18', (yellow card) 73'; Hangya (yellow card) 17'; Novák (yellow card) 71'	Stadium: Pancho Aréna; Attendance: 1,278; Referee: Ádám Farkas

2 April 2016 28	Budapest Honvéd	2–1	Videoton	Budapest
18:30 CEST (UTC+2)	Bobál (yellow card) 25'; Eppel 31'; Lovrić (yellow card) 68'; Vernes 90+2'	Report	Feczesin 32'; Fejes (yellow card) 41'; Oliveira (yellow card) 58'; Pátkai (red card) 90'	Stadium: Bozsik József Stadion; Attendance: 1,829; Referee: István Vad

5 April 2016 29	Videoton	1–0	Debrecen	Felcsút
18:00 CEST (UTC+2)	Pölöskei (yellow card) 35'; Feczesin 37'; Stopira (yellow card) 54'; Simon (yellow card) 64'	Report	Brković (red card) 31'; Szakály (yellow card) 88'; Bódi (yellow card) 90'	Stadium: Pancho Aréna; Attendance: 1,006; Referee: Zsolt Szabó

16 April 2016 30	Paks	0–1	Videoton	Paks
18:00 CEST (UTC+2)	Bartha (yellow card) 40'; Gévay (yellow card) 41'; Kulcsár (yellow card) 53'	Report	Suljić (yellow card) 20'; Simon (yellow card) 28'; Oliveira (yellow card) 36'; Papp 69' (o.g.)	Stadium: Fehérvári úti Stadion; Attendance: 1,674; Referee: Zsolt Szabó

20 April 2016 31	Videoton	1–0	Ferencváros	Felcsút
20:00 CEST (UTC+2)	Suljić (yellow card) 33'; Stopira 56'; Vinícius (yellow card) 90+3'	Report	Leandro (yellow card) 31'; Busai (yellow card) 34'; Trinks (yellow card) 49'; Jova (yellow card) 56'	Stadium: Pancho Aréna; Attendance: 2,112; Referee: Péter Solymosi

23 April 2016 32	Videoton	5–0	MTK Budapest	Felcsút
18:00 CEST (UTC+2)	Négo 5', 83'; Grgić 10' (o.g.); Simon (yellow card) 44'; Tischler 64'; Suljić 65'	Report	Torghelle (red card) 24'; Baki (yellow card) 71'; Vass (yellow card) 85'	Stadium: Pancho Aréna; Attendance: 1,933; Referee: Sándor Andó-Szabó

30 April 2016 33	Újpest	0–3	Videoton	Budapest
16:30 CEST (UTC+2)	Kecskés (yellow card) 28'; Balajcza (red card) 30'; Cseke (yellow card) 68'; Diarra (yellow card) 71'	Report	Nego 55'; Simon (yellow card) 71'; Tischler 76'; Géresi (yellow card) 83'; Juhász 90+3'	Stadium: Szusza Ferenc Stadium; Attendance: 1,894; Referee: Zsolt Szabó

=== Magyar Kupa ===
14 October 2015 Round of 32	Andráshida	0–2	Videoton	Zalaegerszeg
14:00 CEST (UTC+2)	Polareczki (yellow card) 53'; Kalamár (yellow card) 72'; Kovács (yellow card) 90+3'	Report	Vinícius 14'; Stopira (yellow card) 54'; Soumah 79'	Stadium: Andráshida Sporttelep; Attendance: 200; Referee: Gergely Kovács

==== Round of 16 ====
28 October 2015 First leg	Haladás	0–1	Videoton	Szombathely
18:00 CET (UTC+1)	Medgyes (yellow card) 18'; Ugrai (yellow card) 73'	Report	Kovács 54', (yellow card) 76'	Stadium: Rohonci Street Stadium; Attendance: 1,530; Referee: Péter Solymosi

18 November 2015 Second leg	Videoton	1–1 (2–1 agg.)	Haladás	Székesfehérvár
20:15 CET (UTC+1)	Simon (yellow card) 41'; Feczesin 58'; Juhász (yellow card) 72'; Oliveira (yellow card) 90+2'	Report	Gosztonyi (yellow card) 35'; Ugrai 61'; Batarelo (yellow card) 67'; Jagodics (yellow card) 73'; Angyal (yellow card) 88'	Stadium: Sóstói Stadion; Attendance: 1,415; Referee: Zsolt Szabó
Note: Videoton won 2-1 on aggregate.

==== Quarter-finals ====
10 February 2016 First leg	Ferencváros	0–1	Videoton	Budapest
18:00 CET (UTC+1)	Hajnal (yellow card) 12'; Á. Nagy (yellow card) 21'	Report	Pátkai (yellow card) 37'; Feczesin 42', (yellow card) 48'; Kovács (yellow card) 65'; Sejben (yellow card) 90+4'	Stadium: Groupama Arena; Attendance: 3,857; Referee: Zsolt Szabó

2 March 2016 Second leg	Videoton	1–2 (2–2 agg.)	Ferencváros	Felcsút
18:00 CEST (UTC+2)	Simon (yellow card) 10'; Stopira 21'; Pátkai (red card) 83'; Suljić (red card) 84'; Oliveira (yellow card) 90+2'	Report	Šesták (yellow card) 16'; Nalepa (yellow card) 20'; Böde 52'; Kovácsik 82' (o.g.); Trinks (red card) 84'	Stadium: Pancho Aréna; Attendance: 2,800; Referee: Viktor Kassai
Note: 2–2 on aggregate. Ferencváros won on away goals.

=== Szuperkupa ===
5 July 2015 Final	Videoton	0–3	Ferencváros	Székesfehérvár
20:15 CEST (UTC+2)	Pátkai (yellow card) 65'; Szolnoki (yellow card) 90+2'	Report	Lamah 21'; Varga 26'; Nalepa (red card) 37'; D. Nagy (yellow card) 69'; Dibusz (yellow card) 85'; Somália 89'	Stadium: Sóstói Stadion; Attendance: 3,679; Referee: Sándor Andó-Szabó

=== UEFA Champions League ===
==== Second qualifying round ====
14 July 2015 First leg	The New Saints (Wales)	0–1	(Hungary) Videoton	Oswestry, Wales
19:00 BST (UTC+1)	Mullan (yellow card) 74'; Spender (yellow card) 76'; Quigley (yellow card) 84'	Report	Pátkai (yellow card) 42'; Gyurcsó 77'; Trebotić (yellow card) 79'	Stadium: Park Hall; Attendance: 1,068; Referee: Ján Valášek (Slovakia)

22 July 2015 Second leg	Videoton (Hungary)	1–1 (a.e.t.) (2–1 agg.)	(Wales) The New Saints	Székesfehérvár, Hungary
20:30 CEST (UTC+2)	Trebotić (yellow card) 16'; Oliveira (yellow card) 88'; Gyurcsó 107'	Report	Williams 78'; Edwards (yellow card) 92'; Finley (red card) 118'	Stadium: Sóstói Stadion; Attendance: 3,268; Referee: Nerijus Dunauskas (Lithuania)
Note: Videoton won 2–1 on aggregate.

==== Third qualifying round ====
28 July 2015 First leg	Videoton (Hungary)	1–1	(Belarus) BATE Borisov	Székesfehérvár, Hungary
19:30 CEST (UTC+2)	Vinícius 89'	Report	Rodionov (yellow card) 15'; Nikolić (yellow card) 37'; Karnitsky 56'; Signevich (yellow card) 78'	Stadium: Sóstói Stadion; Attendance: 3,118; Referee: Aleksandar Stavrev (Macedonia)

5 August 2015 Second leg	BATE Borisov (Belarus)	1–0 (2–1 agg.)	(Hungary) Videoton	Barysaw, Belarus
17:30 FET (UTC+3)	Aleksiyevich (yellow card) 15'; Nikolić 82'	Report	Luijckx (yellow card) 34' (yellow-red card) 60'; Oliveira (yellow card) 82'	Stadium: Borisov Arena; Attendance: 12,498; Referee: Kenn Hansen (Denmark)
Note: BATE Borisov won 2–1 on aggregate.

=== UEFA Europa League ===
==== Play-off round ====
20 August 2015 First leg	Lech Poznań (Poland)	3–0	(Hungary) Videoton	Poznań, Poland
21:00 CEST (UTC+2)	Linetty 11', (yellow card) 62'; Thomalla 57'; Trałka 68'; Burić (yellow card) 77'	Report	Simon (yellow card) 32'; Kovács (yellow card) 90+2'; Ivanovski (yellow card) 90+4'	Stadium: INEA Stadion; Attendance: 14,133; Referee: Oliver Drachta (Austria)

27 August 2015 Second leg	Videoton (Hungary)	0–1 (0–4 agg.)	(Poland) Lech Poznań	Székesfehérvár, Hungary
19:00 CEST (UTC+2)	Fejes (yellow card) 49'; Luijckx (yellow card) 56'; Simon (yellow card) 67'	Report	Thomalla (yellow card) 39'; Kędziora 57'; Formella (yellow card) 90'	Stadium: Sóstói Stadion; Attendance: 2,815; Referee: Stefan Johannesson (Sweden)
Note: Lech Poznań won 4-0 on aggregate.

== Statistics ==
=== Appearances and goals ===
Last updated on 8 May 2016.

No.	Pos	Nat	Player	Total		Nemzeti Bajnokság I		Magyar Kupa		Szuperkupa		UEFA Champions League		UEFA Europa League	
No.	Pos	Nat	Player	Apps	Goals	Apps	Goals	Apps	Goals	Apps	Goals	Apps	Goals	Apps	Goals
2	DF	(France) FRA	Loïc Négo	29	6	26	6	3	0	0	0	0	0	0	0
3	DF	(Brazil) BRA	Paulo Vinícius	37	2	27	0	3	1	1	0	4	1	2	0
5	MF	(Hungary) HUN	Tibor Heffler	13	0	10	0	3	0	0	0	0	0	0	0
6	DF	(Hungary) HUN	András Fejes	18	0	11	0	1	0	1	0	3	0	2	0
8	MF	(Hungary) HUN	Zsolt Pölöskei	24	0	20	0	4	0	0	0	0	0	0	0
9	FW	(Hungary) HUN	Róbert Feczesin	33	7	26	5	5	2	1	0	0	0	1	0
10	MF	(Hungary) HUN	István Kovács	38	5	26	4	5	1	1	0	4	0	2	0
14	FW	(Hungary) HUN	Gergely Rudolf	8	0	7	0	1	0	0	0	0	0	0	0
15	FW	(Hungary) HUN	Viktor Sejben	12	1	9	1	2	0	0	0	0	0	1	0
16	MF	(Portugal) POR	Filipe Oliveira	40	3	30	3	4	0	1	0	4	0	1	0
17	FW	(Hungary) HUN	Máté Pátkai	38	1	29	1	5	0	1	0	2	0	1	0
18	DF	(Hungary) HUN	Ádám Lang	24	0	16	0	4	0	0	0	3	0	1	0
19	FW	(Hungary) HUN	Patrik Tischler	12	2	11	2	1	0	0	0	0	0	0	0
22	DF	(Cape Verde) CPV	Stopira	18	3	16	2	2	1	0	0	0	0	0	0
23	DF	(Hungary) HUN	Roland Juhász	32	2	24	2	3	0	1	0	3	0	1	0
27	MF	(Guinea) GUI	Alhassane Soumah	15	1	11	0	2	1	0	0	1	0	1	0
30	DF	(Hungary) HUN	Roland Szolnoki	30	0	21	0	2	0	1	0	4	0	2	0
33	MF	(Croatia) CRO	Dinko Trebotić	11	0	4	0	0	0	1	0	4	0	2	0
44	GK	(Serbia) SRB	Branislav Danilović	36	0	25	0	5	0	1	0	3	0	2	0
46	MF	(Hungary) HUN	Ádám Simon	27	1	20	1	3	0	1	0	2	0	1	0
74	GK	(Hungary) HUN	Ádám Kovácsik	8	0	7	0	1	0	0	0	0	0	0	0
88	MF	(Hungary) HUN	Zsolt Haraszti	14	0	12	0	2	0	0	0	0	0	0	0
99	FW	(Bosnia and Herzegovina) BIH	Asmir Suljić	29	2	24	2	5	0	0	0	0	0	0	0
Youth players:
40	DF	(Hungary) HUN	Gergő Gulyás	0	0	0	0	0	0	0	0	0	0	0	0
45	GK	(Hungary) HUN	József Gyánó	0	0	0	0	0	0	0	0	0	0	0	0
49	MF	(Hungary) HUN	Krisztián Géresi	13	2	13	2	0	0	0	0	0	0	0	0
94	DF	(Hungary) HUN	Dávid Kiprich	0	0	0	0	0	0	0	0	0	0	0	0
Players loaned out (for spring):
1	GK	(Serbia) SRB	Filip Pajović	1	0	1	0	0	0	0	0	0	0	0	0
42	GK	(Hungary) HUN	Péter Gábor	1	0	0	0	0	0	0	0	1	0	0	0
Players left the club (from summer):
4	DF	(Netherlands) NED	Kees Luijckx	10	0	5	0	0	0	0	0	4	0	1	0
11	FW	(Hungary) HUN	Tamás Koltai	5	0	2	0	0	0	1	0	1	0	1	0
31	DF	(Martinique) MTQ	Rémi Maréval	4	0	2	0	0	0	0	0	2	0	0	0
77	MF	(Croatia) CRO	Marko Pajač	1	0	0	0	0	0	0	0	1	0	0	0
Players left the club (from winter):
7	MF	(Hungary) HUN	Ádám Gyurcsó	25	9	17	7	2	0	1	0	4	2	1	0
19	FW	(North Macedonia) MKD	Mirko Ivanovski	15	1	8	1	1	0	1	0	3	0	2	0
21	DF	(Hungary) HUN	Adrián Szekeres	1	0	0	0	1	0	0	0	0	0	0	0

=== Goalscorers ===
Rank	No.	Nat.	Name	Nemzeti Bajnokság I	Magyar Kupa	Szuperkupa	UEFA Champions League	UEFA Europa League	Total
1	7	(Hungary)	Ádám Gyurcsó	7	0	0	2	0	9
2	9	(Hungary)	Róbert Feczesin	5	2	0	0	0	7
3	2	(France)	Loïc Négo	6	0	0	0	0	6
4	10	(Hungary)	István Kovács	4	1	0	0	0	5
5	16	(Portugal)	Filipe Oliveira	3	0	0	0	0	3
5	22	(Cape Verde)	Stopira	2	1	0	0	0	3
7	3	(Brazil)	Paulo Vinícius	0	1	0	1	0	2
7	19	(Hungary)	Patrik Tischler	2	0	0	0	0	2
7	23	(Hungary)	Roland Juhász	2	0	0	0	0	2
7	49	(Hungary)	Krisztián Géresi	2	0	0	0	0	2
7	99	(Bosnia and Herzegovina)	Asmir Suljić	2	0	0	0	0	2
12	15	(Hungary)	Viktor Sejben	1	0	0	0	0	1
12	17	(Hungary)	Máté Pátkai	1	0	0	0	0	1
12	19	(North Macedonia)	Mirko Ivanovski	1	0	0	0	0	1
12	27	(Guinea)	Alhassane Soumah	0	1	0	0	0	1
12	46	(Hungary)	Ádám Simon	1	0	0	0	0	1
Own goals				3	0	0	0	0	3
Total				42	6	0	3	0	51

=== Disciplinary record ===
No.	Pos.	Nat.	Name	Nemzeti Bajnokság I		Magyar Kupa		Szuperkupa		UEFA Champions League		UEFA Europa League		Total	
No.	Pos.	Nat.	Name	Yellow card	Red card	Yellow card	Red card	Yellow card	Red card	Yellow card	Red card	Yellow card	Red card	Yellow card	Red card
16	MF	(Portugal)	Filipe Oliveira	11		2				2				15	
17	FW	(Hungary)	Máté Pátkai	10	1	1		1		1				13	1
46	MF	(Hungary)	Ádám Simon	8	1	2						2		12	1
10	MF	(Hungary)	István Kovács	6		2						1		9	
23	DF	(Hungary)	Roland Juhász	7	1	1								8	1
99	FW	(Bosnia and Herzegovina)	Asmir Suljić	7			1							7	1
30	DF	(Hungary)	Roland Szolnoki	5				1						6	
3	DF	(Brazil)	Paulo Vinícius	4	1									4	1
9	FW	(Hungary)	Róbert Feczesin	3		1								4	
22	DF	(Cape Verde)	Stopira	3		1								4	
2	DF	(France)	Loïc Négo	3										3	
6	DF	(Hungary)	András Fejes	2								1		3	
8	MF	(Hungary)	Zsolt Pölöskei	3										3	
44	GK	(Serbia)	Branislav Danilović	3										3	
4	DF	(Netherlands)	Kees Luijckx								1	1		1	1
5	MF	(Hungary)	Tibor Heffler	2										2	
7	MF	(Hungary)	Ádám Gyurcsó	2										2	
15	FW	(Hungary)	Viktor Sejben	1		1								2	
19	FW	(North Macedonia)	Mirko Ivanovski	1								1		2	
27	MF	(Guinea)	Alhassane Soumah	2										2	
31	DF	(Martinique)	Rémi Maréval	2										2	
33	MF	(Croatia)	Dinko Trebotić							2				2	
49	MF	(Hungary)	Krisztián Géresi	2										2	
88	MF	(Hungary)	Zsolt Haraszti	2										2	
14	FW	(Hungary)	Gergely Rudolf	1										1	
18	DF	(Hungary)	Ádám Lang		1										1
Totals				90	5	11	1	2	0	5	1	6	0	114	7

=== Clean sheets ===
Rank	Nat.	Name	Nemzeti Bajnokság I	Magyar Kupa	Szuperkupa	UEFA Champions League	UEFA Europa League	Total
1	(Serbia)	Branislav Danilović	11	3	0	0	0	14
2	(Hungary)	Ádám Kovácsik	2	0	0	0	0	2
3	(Hungary)	Péter Gábor	0	0	0	1	0	1
4	(Serbia)	Filip Pajović	0	0	0	0	0	0
Total			13	3	0	1	0	17
