= 2013–14 Videoton FC season =

Videoton FC
2013–14 season
- Chairman: (Hungary) István Garancsi
- Manager: (Portugal) José Gomes
- NB 1: 4th
- UEFA Europa League: First Qualifying Round
- Hungarian Cup: Round of 16
- Hungarian League Cup: Runners-up
- Top goalscorer: League: (Hungary) Nemanja Nikolić (18); All: (Hungary) Nemanja Nikolić (19)
- Highest home attendance: 6,500 vs Mladost Podgorica (4 July 2013)
- Lowest home attendance: 300 vs Pécs (2 April 2014)
Home colours	Away colours	Third colours

The 2013–14 season will be Videoton FC's 45th competitive season, 14th consecutive season in the OTP Bank Liga and 72nd year in existence as a football club.

== Current squad ==
Note: Flags indicate national team as defined under FIFA eligibility rules; some limited exceptions apply. Players may hold more than one non-FIFA nationality.

No.	Pos.	Nation	Player
1	GK	ESP	Juan Calatayud
2	DF	ESP	Álvaro Brachi
3	DF	BRA	Paulo Vinícius
4	DF	POR	Marco Caneira
5	MF	POR	Vítor Gomes
6	MF	BRA	Nildo Petrolina
7	FW	BRA	Paraiba
8	MF	HUN	László Kleinheisler
9	FW	POR	Jucie Lupeta
11	MF	HUN	György Sándor
12	GK	SVK	Tomáš Tujvel
16	MF	POR	Filipe Oliveira

No.	Pos.	Nation	Player
17	FW	HUN	Nemanja Nikolić
22	DF	CPV	Stopira
23	FW	SLV	Arturo Alvarez
24	DF	GNB	Mamadu Candé
29	FW	CPV	Zé Luís (on loan from Braga)
30	DF	HUN	Roland Szolnoki
32	DF	HUN	Roland Juhász
34	DF	HUN	Zsolt Tar
70	MF	HUN	István Kovács
77	MF	HUN	Ádám Gyurcsó
88	FW	HUN	Zsolt Haraszti

== Transfers ==
=== Summer ===
In: Note: Flags indicate national team as defined under FIFA eligibility rules; some limited exceptions apply. Players may hold more than one non-FIFA nationality.

No.	Pos.	Nation	Player
1	GK	ESP	Juan Calatayud (from (Spain) Mallorca)
5	MF	POR	Vítor Gomes (from (Portugal) Rio Ave)
5	DF	GRE	Vassilios Apostolopoulos (loan return from Puskás)
6	MF	BRA	Nildo Petrolina (from (Portugal) Beira-Mar)
7	MF	HUN	Dénes Szakály (loan return from Puskás)
8	MF	HUN	László Kleinheisler (from Puskás)
8	FW	SRB	Milan Perić (loan return from Ferencváros)
9	FW	POR	Evandro Brandão (loan return from (Portugal) Olhanense)
11	MF	HUN	György Sándor (loan return from (Saudi Arabia) Al-Ittihad)
18	MF	HUN	Máté Papp (from Videoton II)
19	FW	HUN	László Lencse (loan return from (Greece) Asteras Tripoli)
22	MF	HUN	Dániel Nagy (loan return from Puskás)
23	FW	SLV	Arturo Alvarez (from (Portugal) Paços de Ferreira)
23	DF	HUN	Tamás Vaskó (loan return from Kecskemét)
24	DF	GNB	Mamadu Candé (from (Portugal) Aves)
29	FW	CPV	Zé Luís (loan from (Portugal) Braga)
29	MF	NGA	Moris Enete (from Puskás)
32	DF	HUN	Roland Juhász (from (Belgium) Anderlecht)
66	DF	HUN	Gábor Gyepes (from (England) Portsmouth)

Out: Note: Flags indicate national team as defined under FIFA eligibility rules; some limited exceptions apply. Players may hold more than one non-FIFA nationality.

No.	Pos.	Nation	Player
5	DF	GRE	Vassilios Apostolopoulos (loan to Puskás)
5	MF	POR	Vítor Gomes (loan return to (Portugal) Rio Ave)
7	MF	HUN	Dénes Szakály (loan to Puskás)
8	FW	SRB	Milan Perić (to Videoton II)
9	MF	POR	Evandro Brandão (to (Portugal) Tondela)
14	MF	SRB	Nikola Mitrović (to (Israel) Maccabi Tel Aviv)
18	MF	HUN	Máté Papp (loan to Dunaújváros)
19	FW	HUN	László Lencse (loan to Puskás)
21	DF	HUN	Adrián Szekeres (loan to Puskás)
22	MF	HUN	Dániel Nagy (to Siófok)
23	DF	BRA	Kaká (to (Spain) Deportivo)
23	DF	HUN	Tamás Vaskó (to Videoton II)
23	FW	SLV	Arturo Alvarez (loan return to (Portugal) Paços de Ferreira)
24	DF	ESP	Héctor Sánchez
27	GK	MNE	Mladen Božović (to (Russia) Tom Tomsk)
32	DF	HUN	Roland Juhász (loan return to (Belgium) Anderlecht)
88	MF	HUN	Zsolt Haraszti (loan to Puskás)
99	MF	SRB	Uroš Nikolić (loan to Puskás)

=== Winter ===
In: Note: Flags indicate national team as defined under FIFA eligibility rules; some limited exceptions apply. Players may hold more than one non-FIFA nationality.

No.	Pos.	Nation	Player
18	MF	HUN	Máté Papp (from Videoton II)
88	FW	HUN	Zsolt Haraszti (loan return from Puskás)
99	MF	SRB	Uroš Nikolić (loan return from Puskás)

Out: Note: Flags indicate national team as defined under FIFA eligibility rules; some limited exceptions apply. Players may hold more than one non-FIFA nationality.

No.	Pos.	Nation	Player
8	FW	SRB	Milan Perić (loan to Pécs)
14	FW	HUN	Sándor Torghelle (to MTK Budapest)
20	MF	HUN	Donát Zsótér (loan to Szolnok)
23	DF	HUN	Tamás Vaskó (to Mezőkövesd)
26	MF	HUN	Balázs Tóth (loan to Puskás)
66	DF	HUN	Gábor Gyepes (to (Malaysia) Sarawak)

- List of Hungarian football transfers summer 2013
- List of Hungarian football transfers winter 2013–14

== Statistics ==
=== Appearances and goals ===
Last updated on 1 June 2014.

No.	Pos	Nat	Player	Total		OTP Bank Liga		Europa League		Hungarian Cup		League Cup	
No.	Pos	Nat	Player	Apps	Goals	Apps	Goals	Apps	Goals	Apps	Goals	Apps	Goals
1	GK	(Spain) ESP	Juan Calatayud	36	-36	30	-32	0	0	2	-1	4	-3
2	DF	(Spain) ESP	Álvaro Brachi	19	1	9	0	0	0	2	0	8	1
3	DF	(Brazil) BRA	Paulo Vinícius	40	2	25	1	2	1	3	0	10	0
4	DF	(Portugal) POR	Marco Caneira	36	0	23	0	1	0	2	0	10	0
5	MF	(Portugal) POR	Vítor Gomes	37	1	24	1	2	0	2	0	9	0
6	MF	(Brazil) BRA	Nildo Petrolina	34	5	20	2	0	0	3	0	11	3
7	FW	(Brazil) BRA	Paraiba	17	1	8	0	2	0	0	0	7	1
8	MF	(Hungary) HUN	László Kleinheisler	25	4	19	4	2	0	2	0	2	0
9	FW	(Portugal) POR	Jucie Lupeta	11	5	2	0	0	0	1	0	8	5
11	MF	(Hungary) HUN	György Sándor	35	1	27	1	0	0	3	0	5	0
12	GK	(Slovakia) SVK	Tomáš Tujvel	11	-13	0	0	2	-2	0	0	9	-11
16	MF	(Portugal) POR	Filipe Oliveira	30	2	16	1	2	0	2	0	10	1
17	FW	(Hungary) HUN	Nemanja Nikolić	34	19	28	18	2	0	1	0	3	1
22	DF	(Cape Verde) CPV	Stopira	33	1	29	1	1	0	0	0	3	0
23	MF	(El Salvador) SLV	Arturo Alvarez	33	7	22	4	1	0	1	0	9	3
24	DF	(Guinea-Bissau) GNB	Mamadu Candé	18	0	3	0	1	0	3	0	11	0
29	FW	(Cape Verde) CPV	Zé Luís	38	16	26	9	0	0	3	1	9	6
30	DF	(Hungary) HUN	Roland Szolnoki	25	1	21	0	1	0	1	0	2	1
32	DF	(Hungary) HUN	Roland Juhász	24	4	19	2	0	0	0	0	5	2
34	DF	(Hungary) HUN	Zsolt Tar	11	1	3	0	0	0	1	0	7	1
40	FW	(Nigeria) NGA	Moris Enete	1	0	0	0	1	0	0	0	0	0
70	MF	(Hungary) HUN	István Kovács	29	1	23	1	2	0	2	0	2	0
77	MF	(Hungary) HUN	Ádám Gyurcsó	30	7	19	3	2	1	2	0	7	3
88	FW	(Hungary) HUN	Zsolt Haraszti	15	3	11	2	0	0	0	0	4	1
Youth players:
15	MF	(Hungary) HUN	Rajmund Teixeira	1	0	0	0	0	0	0	0	1	0
18	MF	(Hungary) HUN	Máté Papp	2	0	0	0	0	0	0	0	2	0
27	DF	(Brazil) BRA	Thiago	1	0	0	0	0	0	0	0	1	0
31	MF	(Hungary) HUN	Martin Hudák	3	0	0	0	0	0	0	0	3	0
Out to loan:
20	MF	(Hungary) HUN	Donát Zsótér	4	0	0	0	0	0	0	0	4	0
21	DF	(Hungary) HUN	Adrián Szekeres	1	0	0	0	1	0	0	0	0	0
26	MF	(Hungary) HUN	Balázs Tóth	14	0	4	0	2	0	3	0	5	0
28	MF	(Hungary) HUN	Gáspár Orbán	1	0	0	0	0	0	0	0	1	0
Players no longer at the club:
14	FW	(Hungary) HUN	Sándor Torghelle	10	1	5	0	0	0	1	0	4	1
66	DF	(Hungary) HUN	Gábor Gyepes	7	0	2	0	0	0	1	0	4	0

=== Top scorers ===
Includes all competitive matches. The list is sorted by shirt number when total goals are equal.

Last updated on 1 June 2014

Position	Nation	Number	Name	OTP Bank Liga	Hungarian Cup	Europa League	League Cup	Total
1	(Hungary)	17	Nemanja Nikolić	18	0	0	1	19
2	(Cape Verde)	29	Zé Luís	9	0	1	6	16
3	(El Salvador)	23	Arturo Alvarez	4	0	0	3	7
4	(Hungary)	77	Ádám Gyurcsó	3	1	0	3	7
5	(Brazil)	6	Nildo Petrolina	2	0	0	3	5
6	(Portugal)	9	Jucie Lupeta	0	0	0	5	5
7	(Hungary)	8	László Kleinheisler	4	0	0	0	4
8	(Hungary)	32	Roland Juhász	2	0	0	2	4
9	(Hungary)	88	Zsolt Haraszti	2	0	0	1	3
10	(Brazil)	3	Paulo Vinícius	1	1	0	0	2
11	(Portugal)	16	Filipe Oliveira	1	0	0	1	2
12	(Hungary)	11	György Sándor	1	0	0	0	1
13	(Hungary)	70	István Kovács	1	0	0	0	1
14	(Portugal)	5	Vítor Gomes	1	0	0	0	1
15	(Cape Verde)	22	Stopira	1	0	0	0	1
16	(Brazil)	7	Paraiba	0	0	0	1	1
17	(Hungary)	34	Zsolt Tar	0	0	0	1	1
18	(Hungary)	30	Roland Szolnoki	0	0	0	1	1
19	(Hungary)	14	Sándor Torghelle	0	0	0	1	1
20	(Spain)	2	Álvaro Brachi	0	0	0	1	1
/	/	/	Own Goals	1	0	0	0	1
			TOTALS	52	2	1	30	85

=== Disciplinary record ===
Includes all competitive matches. Players with 1 card or more included only.

Last updated on 1 June 2014

Position	Nation	Number	Name	OTP Bank Liga		Europa League		Hungarian Cup		League Cup		Total (Hu Total)	
Position	Nation	Number	Name	Booked	Sent off (straight red)	Booked	Sent off (straight red)	Booked	Sent off (straight red)	Booked	Sent off (straight red)	Booked	Sent off (straight red)
GK	(Spain)	1	Juan Calatayud	1	0	0	0	0	0	0	0	1 (1)	0 (0)
DF	(Spain)	2	Álvaro Brachi	1	0	0	0	0	0	2	0	3 (1)	0 (0)
DF	(Brazil)	3	Paulo Vinícius	10	1	0	0	1	0	0	0	11 (10)	1 (1)
DF	(Portugal)	4	Marco Caneira	10	0	1	0	2	0	1	0	14 (10)	0 (0)
MF	(Portugal)	5	Vítor Gomes	2	0	1	0	0	0	1	0	4 (2)	0 (0)
MF	(Brazil)	6	Nildo Petrolina	2	0	0	0	0	0	0	0	2 (2)	0 (0)
FW	(Brazil)	7	Paraiba	2	0	0	0	0	0	0	0	2 (2)	0 (0)
FW	(Portugal)	9	Jucie Lupeta	1	0	0	0	0	0	0	0	1 (1)	0 (0)
MF	(Hungary)	11	György Sándor	6	0	0	0	0	0	0	0	6 (6)	0 (0)
MF	(Portugal)	16	Filipe Oliveira	2	1	0	0	1	0	1	0	4 (2)	1 (1)
FW	(Hungary)	17	Nemanja Nikolić	2	0	0	0	0	0	1	0	3 (2)	0 (0)
DF	(Cape Verde)	22	Stopira	3	0	0	0	0	0	0	0	3 (3)	0 (0)
MF	(El Salvador)	23	Arturo Alvarez	2	0	1	0	0	0	0	0	3 (2)	0 (0)
DF	(Guinea-Bissau)	24	Mamadu Candé	2	0	0	0	0	0	3	0	5 (2)	0 (0)
MF	(Hungary)	26	Balázs Tóth	1	0	0	0	1	0	1	1	3 (1)	1 (0)
FW	(Cape Verde)	29	Zé Luís	3	0	0	0	0	0	1	0	4 (3)	0 (0)
DF	(Hungary)	30	Roland Szolnoki	6	0	1	0	1	0	1	0	9 (6)	0 (0)
MF	(Hungary)	31	Martin Hudák	0	0	0	0	0	0	2	0	2 (0)	0 (0)
DF	(Hungary)	32	Roland Juhász	6	0	0	0	0	0	1	0	7 (6)	0 (0)
DF	(Hungary)	66	Gábor Gyepes	0	0	0	0	1	0	1	1	2 (0)	1 (0)
MF	(Hungary)	70	István Kovács	1	0	0	0	1	0	0	0	2 (1)	0 (0)
MF	(Hungary)	77	Ádám Gyurcsó	0	0	0	0	1	0	0	0	1 (0)	0 (0)
FW	(Hungary)	88	Zsolt Haraszti	1	0	0	0	0	0	1	0	2 (1)	0 (0)
			TOTALS	64	2	4	0	9	0	17	2	94 (64)	4 (2)

=== Overall ===
Games played	48 (30 OTP Bank Liga, 2 Europa League, 3 Hungarian Cup and 13 Hungarian League Cup)
Games won	24 (15 OTP Bank Liga, 1 Europa League, 1 Hungarian Cup and 7 Hungarian League Cup)
Games drawn	12 (8 OTP Bank Liga, 0 Europa League, 1 Hungarian Cup and 3 Hungarian League Cup)
Games lost	12 (7 OTP Bank Liga, 1 Europa League, 1 Hungarian Cup and 3 Hungarian League Cup)
Goals scored	85
Goals conceded	48
Goal difference	+37
Yellow cards	94
Red cards	4
Worst discipline	(Portugal) Marco Caneira (14 (yellow card) , 0 (red card) )
Best result	5–1 (H) v Pécs – OTP Bank Liga – 11-08-2013
Best result	4–0 (H) v Kozármisleny – Ligakupa – 16-10-2013
Best result	5–1 (A) v Debrecen – Ligakupa – 22-04-2014
Worst result	1–4 (H) v Paks – Ligakupa – 13-11-2013
Most appearances	(Brazil) Paulo Vinícius (40 appearances)
Top scorer	(Hungary) Nemanja Nikolić (19 goals)
Points	84/144 (58.33%)

Last updated: 1 June 2014

== Nemzeti Bajnokság I ==
=== Matches ===
28 July 2013 1	Videoton	2–0	Szombathely	Székesfehérvár, Fejér County
16:30 CEST	Kleinheisler 25'; Nikolić 46'	(Report)		Stadium: Sóstói Stadion; Attendance: 4,047; Referee: (Hungary) Sándor Andó-Szabó

4 August 2013 2	Ferencváros	0–2	Videoton	Budapest, Pest County
16:30 CEST		(Report)	Nikolić 7', 76' (pen.)	Stadium: Ferenc Puskás Stadium; Attendance: 12,400; Referee: (Hungary) Viktor Kassai

11 August 2013 3	Videoton	5–1	Pécs	Székesfehérvár, Fejér County
16:30 CEST	Nikolić 27' (pen.), 44'; Vinícius 35'; Sándor 70'; Alvarez 77'	(Report)	Frőhlich 24'	Stadium: Sóstói Stadion; Attendance: 3,320; Referee: (Hungary) Tamás Bognár

18 August 2013 4	Videoton	4–1	Paks	Székesfehérvár, Fejér County
18:30 CEST	Nikolić 3', 8' (pen.); Juhász 65'; Gyurcsó 83'	(Report)	Könyves 90'	Stadium: Sóstói Stadion; Attendance: 3,600; Referee: (Hungary) Péter Solymosi

25 August 2013 5	Győr	1–1	Videoton	Győr, Győr-Moson-Sopron County
20:30 CEST	Pátkai 18'	(Report)	Juhász 35'	Stadium: ETO Park; Attendance: 4,000; Referee: (Hungary) Viktor Kassai

1 September 2013 6	Videoton	2–0	MTK	Székesfehérvár, Fejér County
20:30 CEST	Kálnoki-Kis 39' (o.g.); Nikolić 42'	(Report)		Stadium: Sóstói Stadion; Attendance: 2,850; Referee: (Hungary) Tamás Bognár

15 September 2013 7	Debrecen	2–1	Videoton	Debrecen, Hajdú-Bihar County
16:30 CEST	Sidibe 60'; Volaš 78'	(Report)	Gyurcsó 51'	Stadium: Stadion Oláh Gábor Út; Attendance: 7,500; Referee: (Hungary) István Vad

21 September 2013 8	Videoton	1–0	Kecskemét	Székesfehérvár, Fejér County
20:00 CEST	Zé Luís 79'	(Report)		Stadium: Sóstói Stadion; Attendance: 2,550; Referee: (Hungary) Péter Solymosi

28 September 2013 9	Pápa	1–2	Videoton	Pápa, Veszprém County
14:00 CEST	Griffiths 10'	(Report)	Nikolić 2', 6'	Stadium: Stadion Várkerti; Attendance: 1,500; Referee: (Hungary) Ádám Farkas

6 October 2013 10	Videoton	3–0	Újpest	Székesfehérvár, Fejér County
18:30 CEST	Zé Luís 48', 66'; Kleinheisler 53'	(Report)		Stadium: Sóstói Stadion; Attendance: 3,420; Referee: (Hungary) Viktor Kassai

19 October 2013 11	Videoton	3–0	Puskás	Székesfehérvár, Fejér County
14:00 CEST	Zé Luís 66'; Petrolina 75'; Alvarez 90'	(Report)		Stadium: Sóstói Stadion; Attendance: 3,020; Referee: (Hungary) Péter Solymosi

27 October 2013 12	Videoton	1–2	Honvéd	Székesfehérvár, Fejér County
16:30 CET	Nikolić 21'	(Report)	Nagy 27'; Perea 90+2'	Stadium: Sóstói Stadion; Attendance: 4,202; Referee: (Hungary) Tamás Bognár

2 November 2013 13	Kaposvár	1–0	Videoton	Kaposvár, Somogy County
16:00 CET	Waltner 69' (pen.)	(Report)		Stadium: Stadion Kaposvár Rákóczi; Attendance: 1,500; Referee: (Hungary) Ádám Németh

8 November 2013 14	Videoton	1–0	Mezőkövesd	Székesfehérvár, Fejér County
19:00 CET	Kleinheisler 87'	(Report)		Stadium: Sóstói Stadion; Attendance: 2,305; Referee: (Hungary) József Erdős

24 November 2013 15	Diósgyőr	2–2	Videoton	Miskolc, Borsod-Abaúj-Zemplén County
16:30 CET	Bacsa 5'; Gohér 73'	(Report)	Kleinheisler 1'; Kovács 29'	Stadium: DVTK Stadion; Attendance: 5,039; Referee: (Hungary) István Vad

1 December 2013 16	Szombathely	1–1	Videoton	Szombathely, Vas County
18:30 CEST	Ugrai 61'	(Report)	Nikolić 40' (pen.)	Stadium: Stadion Rohonci Út; Attendance: 2,200; Referee: (Hungary) Viktor Kassai

8 December 2013 17	Videoton	2–3	Ferencváros	Székesfehérvár, Fejér County
16:30 CET	Gomes 26'; Nikolić 76'	(Report)	Busai 13'; Böde 59'; Jenner 63'	Stadium: Sóstói Stadion; Attendance: 4,391; Referee: (Hungary) Sándor Andó-Szabó

1 March 2014 18	Pécs	1–1	Videoton	Pécs, Baranya County
18:00 CET	Kővári 60'	(Report)	Gyurcsó 23'	Stadium: Stadion PMFC; Attendance: 2,000; Referee: (Hungary) Sándor Andó-Szabó

9 March 2014 19	Paks	2–2	Videoton	Paks, Tolna County
18:30 CET	Heffler 35'; Caneira 49' (o.g.)	(Report)	Haraszti 22'; Nikolić 78'	Stadium: Stadion PSE; Attendance: 1,000; Referee: (Hungary) Mihály Fábián

16 March 2014 20	Videoton	0–1	Győr	Székesfehérvár, Fejér County
18:30 CET		(Report)	Martínez 67'	Stadium: Sóstói Stadion; Attendance: 3,050; Referee: (Hungary) István Vad

22 March 2014 21	MTK	1–2	Videoton	Budapest, Pest County
16:00 CET	Torghelle 83' (pen.)	(Report)	Alvarez 71'; Petrolina 74'	Stadium: Hidegkuti Nándor Stadium; Attendance: 1,000; Referee: (Hungary) Viktor Kassai

30 March 2014 22	Videoton	1–2	Debrecen	Székesfehérvár, Fejér County
16:30 CEST	Nikolić 15'	(Report)	Caneira 25' (o.g.); Máté 36'	Stadium: Sóstói Stadion; Attendance: 5,232; Referee: (Hungary) Zoltán Iványi

5 April 2014 23	Kecskemét	3–1	Videoton	Kecskemét, Bács-Kiskun County
18:00 CEST	Eninful 43'; Bebeto 63'; Szécsi 89'	(Report)	Nikolić 65'	Stadium: Széktói Stadion; Attendance: 2,218; Referee: (Hungary) Sándor Andó-Szabó

12 April 2014 24	Videoton	2–2	Pápa	Székesfehérvár, Fejér County
16:00 CEST	Zé Luís 53'; Alvarez 62'	(Report)	Arsić 10'; Marić 58'	Stadium: Sóstói Stadion; Attendance: 2,200; Referee: (Hungary) Ádám Németh

19 April 2014 25	Újpest	1–2	Videoton	Budapest, Pest County
18:00 CEST	Kabát 81'	(Report)	Zé Luís 58', 60'	Stadium: Szusza Ferenc Stadium; Attendance: 2,194; Referee: (Hungary) József Erdős

26 April 2014 26	Puskás	1–3	Videoton	Felcsút, Fejér County
14:00 CEST	Tischler 62'	(Report)	Nikolić 19' (pen.); Zé Luís 74'; Oliveira 78'	Stadium: Pancho Arena; Attendance: 3,633; Referee: (Hungary) Viktor Kassai

3 May 2014 27	Honvéd	0–1	Videoton	Budapest, Pest County
14:00 CEST		(Report)	Stopira 43'	Stadium: Bozsik Stadion; Attendance: 1,000; Referee: (Hungary) Péter Solymosi

10 May 2014 28	Videoton	2–0	Kaposvár	Székesfehérvár, Fejér County
18:00 CEST	Zé Luís 51'; Nikolić 74'	(Report)		Stadium: Sóstói Stadion; Attendance: 2,466; Referee: (Hungary) Ádám Farkas

18 May 2014 29	Mezőkövesd	1–1	Videoton	Mezőkövesd, Borsod-Abaúj-Zemplén County
18:30 CEST	Melczer 47'	(Report)	Haraszti 90'	Stadium: Mezőkövesdi Városi Stadion; Attendance: 2,400; Referee: (Hungary) Zoltán Iványi

1 June 2014 30	Videoton	1–1	Diósgyőr	Székesfehérvár, Fejér County
16:30 CEST	Nikolić 76'	(Report)	Futács 68'	Stadium: Sóstói Stadion; Attendance: 3,461; Referee: (Hungary) Tamás Bognár

=== Classification ===
Pos	Team	Pld	W	D	L	GF	GA	GD	Pts	Qualification or relegation
2	Győr	30	18	8	4	58	32	+26	62	Qualification for Europa League second qualifying round
3	Ferencváros	30	17	6	7	47	33	+14	57	Qualification for Europa League first qualifying round
4	Videoton	30	15	8	7	52	31	+21	53	
5	Diósgyőr	30	12	11	7	45	38	+7	47	Qualification for Europa League first qualifying round (Note: Diósgyőr qualified for the Europa League first qualifying round as the 2013–14 Magyar Kupa runners-up since the winners, Újpest, failed to receive the UEFA license to participate in European competitions.)
6	Haladás	30	12	10	8	37	31	+6	46	

Source: mlsz.hu (in Hungarian)
Rules for classification: 1st points; 2nd overall wins; 3rd goal difference; 4th head-to-head points; 5th head-to-head goal difference; 6th head-to-head away goals scored; 7th fair-play points; 8th drawing of lots

=== Results summary ===
Overall								Home						Away					
Pld	W	D	L	GF	GA	GD	Pts	W	D	L	GF	GA	GD	W	D	L	GF	GA	GD
30	15	8	7	52	31	+21	53	9	2	4	30	13	+17	6	6	3	22	18	+4

Last updated: 1 June 2014.
Source: NB1

=== Results by round ===
Round	1	2	3	4	5	6	7	8	9	10	11	12	13	14	15	16	17	18	19	20	21	22	23	24	25	26	27	28	29	30
Ground	H	A	H	H	A	H	A	H	A	H	H	H	A	H	A	A	H	A	A	H	A	H	A	H	A	A	A	H	A	H
Result	W	W	W	W	D	W	L	W	W	W	W	L	L	W	D	D	L	D	D	L	W	L	L	D	W	W	W	W	D	D
Position	4	2	2	1	2	1	2	1	1	1	1	1	1	1	2	2	2	2	2	2	2	3	3	4	3	3	3	3	4	4

Updated to match(es) played on 1 June 2014. Source: Matches
A = Away; H = Home; W = Win; D = Draw; L = Loss

== Hungarian Cup ==
30 October 2013 Round of 32	Békéscsaba	0–1 (a.e.t.)	Videoton	Békéscsaba, Békés County
18:00 CET		(Report)	Zé Luís 117'	Stadium: Stadion Kórház utcai Attendance: 200; Referee: (Hungary) Gergely Szőts

27 November 2013 Round of 16 (1st leg)	Videoton	0–0	Diósgyőr	Székesfehérvár, Fejér County
17:00 CET		(Report)		Stadium: Sóstói Stadion; Attendance: 1,100; Referee: (Hungary) Ádám Farkas

4 December 2013 Round of 16 (2nd leg)	Diósgyőr	1–0 (1–0 agg.)	Videoton	Miskolc, Borsod-Abaúj-Zemplén County
18:00 CET	Futács 16' (pen.)	Report		Stadium: DVTK Stadion; Attendance: 2,359; Referee: (Hungary) Péter Solymosi

== League Cup ==
=== Group stage ===
4 September 2013 1	Videoton	3–0	Dunaújváros	Székesfehérvár, Fejér County
18:00 CEST	Lupeta 1'; Paraiba 33'; Tar 79'	(Report)		Stadium: Sóstói Stadion; Attendance: 1,200; Referee: (Hungary) Balázs Böcskei

10 September 2013 2	Paks	3–3	Videoton	Paks, Tolna County
16:30 CEST	Heffler 10'; Délczeg 20'; Kiss 44'	(Report)	Zé Luís 46'; Szolnoki 68'; Gyurcsó 90+1'	Stadium: Stadion PSE; Attendance: 400; Referee: (Hungary) Ferenc Karakó

9 October 2013 3	Videoton	1–2	Kozármisleny	Székesfehérvár, Fejér County
18:00 CEST	Zé Luís 81'	(Report)	Cziráki 24'; Tóth 44'	Stadium: Sóstói Stadion; Attendance: 1,000; Referee: (Hungary) Szabolcs Szilasi

16 October 2013 4	Kozármisleny	0–4	Videoton	Kozármisleny, Baranya County
14:30 CEST		(Report)	Torghelle 7' (pen.); Alvarez 32', 72'; Gyurcsó 45'	Stadium: Stadium Alkotmány Square; Attendance: 100; Referee: (Hungary) József Berger

13 November 2013 5	Videoton	1–4	Paks	Székesfehérvár, Fejér County
17:00 CET	Zé Luís 67'	(Report)	Könyves 12'; Délczeg 15', 52'; Bartha 49'	Stadium: Sóstói Stadion; Attendance: 500; Referee: (Hungary) Ádám Radványi

20 November 2013 6	Dunaújváros	0–3	Videoton	Dunaújváros, Fejér County
13:00 CET		(Report)	Lupeta 35', 64', 76'	Stadium: Dunaferr Arena; Attendance: 400; Referee: (Hungary) Csaba Pintér

==== Classification ====
Pos	Team	Pld	W	D	L	GF	GA	GD	Pts	Qualification
1	Paks	6	4	1	1	16	7	+9	13	Advance to knockout phase
2	Videoton	6	3	1	2	15	9	+6	10	Advance to knockout phase
3	Kozármisleny	6	2	1	3	7	13	−6	7	
4	Dunaújváros	6	1	1	4	2	11	−9	4	

Rules for classification: 1) points; 2) goal difference; 3) number of goals scored.

=== Knockout phase ===
26 February 2014 Round of 16 (1st leg)	Videoton	3–0	Kaposvár	Székesfehérvár, Fejér County
16:00 CET	Zé Luís 23'; Petrolina 69'; Lupeta 88'	(Report)		Stadium: Sóstói Stadion; Attendance: 1,300; Referee: (Hungary) Csaba Pintér

4 March 2014 Round of 16 (2nd leg)	Kaposvár	1–1 (1–4 agg.)	Videoton	Kaposvár, Somogy County
13:30 CET	Murai 50'	(Report)	Zé Luís 81'	Stadium: Stadion Kaposvár Rákóczi; Attendance: 250; Referee: (Hungary) Norbert Kiss

18 March 2014 Quarter-final (1st leg)	Pécs	1–1	Videoton	Pécs, Baranya County
17:30 CET	Perić 34'	(Report)	Nikolić 61'	Stadium: Stadion PMFC; Attendance: 300; Referee: (Hungary) Zoltán Iványi

2 April 2014 Quarter-final (2nd leg)	Videoton	3–0 (4–1 agg.)	Pécs	Székesfehérvár, Fejér County
17:30 CEST	Juhász 21'; Haraszti 71'; Zé Luís 84'	(Report)		Stadium: Sóstói Stadion; Attendance: 300; Referee: (Hungary) Ádám Farkas

22 April 2014 Semi-final (1st leg)	Debrecen	1–5	Videoton	Debrecen, Hajdú-Bihar County
18:00 CEST	Ludánszki 67'	(Report)	Petrolina 6', 74'; Alvarez 9'; Brachi 41'; Oliveira 82'	Stadium: Stadion Oláh Gábor Út; Attendance: 2,000; Referee: (Hungary) Ádám Farkas

29 April 2014 Semi-final (2nd leg)	Videoton	1–0 (6–1 agg.)	Debrecen	Székesfehérvár, Fejér County
17:30 CEST	Gyurcsó 38'	(Report)		Stadium: Sóstói Stadion; Attendance: 700; Referee: (Hungary) Zsolt Szabó

13 May 2014 Final	Diósgyőr	2–1	Videoton	Miskolc, Borsod-Abaúj-Zemplén County
19:00 CEST	Kostić 9'; Futács 12'	(Report)	Juhász 69'	Stadium: DVTK Stadion; Attendance: 6,000; Referee: (Hungary) Sándor Andó-Szabó

== UEFA Europa League ==
The First and Second Qualifying Round draws took place at UEFA headquarters in Nyon, Switzerland on 24 June 2013.

4 July 2013 Q1 Leg 1	Videoton (Hungary)	2–1	(Montenegro) Mladost Podgorica	Székesfehérvár
20:30 CEST	Vinícius 36'; Gyurcsó 41'	(Report)	Marković 3' (pen.)	Stadium: Sóstói Stadion; Attendance: 6,500; Referee: (Sweden) Andreas Ekberg

11 July 2013 Q1 Leg 2	Mladost Podgorica (Montenegro)	1–0 ((a) 2 – 2 agg.)	(Hungary) Videoton	Podgorica
17:30 CEST	Knežević 90+2' (pen.)	Report		Stadium: Cvijetni Brijeg Stadium; Attendance: 2,700; Referee: (Belgium) Jérôme Efong Nzolo

== Pre-season ==
22 June 2013 1	SK Jenbach (Austria)	0–6	(Hungary) Videoton FC	Jenbach, Austria
18:00 CEST		(Report)	Lupeta 3', 43'; Nikolić 49', 87'; Alvarez 69'; Gyurcsó 80'	Stadium: Jenbach Stadium; Attendance: 150

25 June 2013 2	FC Steaua București (Romania)	0–1	(Hungary) Videoton FC	Jenbach, Austria
20:00 CEST		(Report)	Caneira 62'	Stadium: Jenbach Stadium; Attendance: 500

28 June 2013 3	Karlsruher SC (Germany)	1–0	(Hungary) Videoton FC	Walchsee, Austria
15:30 CEST	Schwertfeger 69'	(Report)		Stadium: Stadion Walchsee; Attendance: 50; Referee: (Austria)

20 July 2013 4	Videoton FC (Hungary)	4–0	(Hungary) Dunaújváros FC	Székesfehérvár, Fejér County
16:30 CEST	Zsótér 37'; Torghelle 44'; Nikolić 86'; Kovács 90' (pen.)	(Report)		Stadium: Sóstói Stadion; Attendance: 800; Referee: (Hungary) Tamás Rózsa

24 July 2013 5	Videoton FC (Hungary)	6–1	(Hungary) Vasas SC	Felcsút, Fejér County
16:30 CEST	Nikolić 11', 22'; Zé Luís 56', 68'; Hudák 80'; Juhász 86'	(Report)	Ádám 58'	Stadium: Városi Sporttelep; Attendance: 200; Referee: (Hungary) Závodka
