= ING Cup =

ING Cup may refer to:

- ING Cup (cricket), 2001–02 to 2005–06 Australian cricket tournament
- ING Cup (football), 2008 pre-Olympics football tournament
- Ing Cup, international Go tournament
