= István Kovács (footballer, born 1992) =

Hungarian footballer

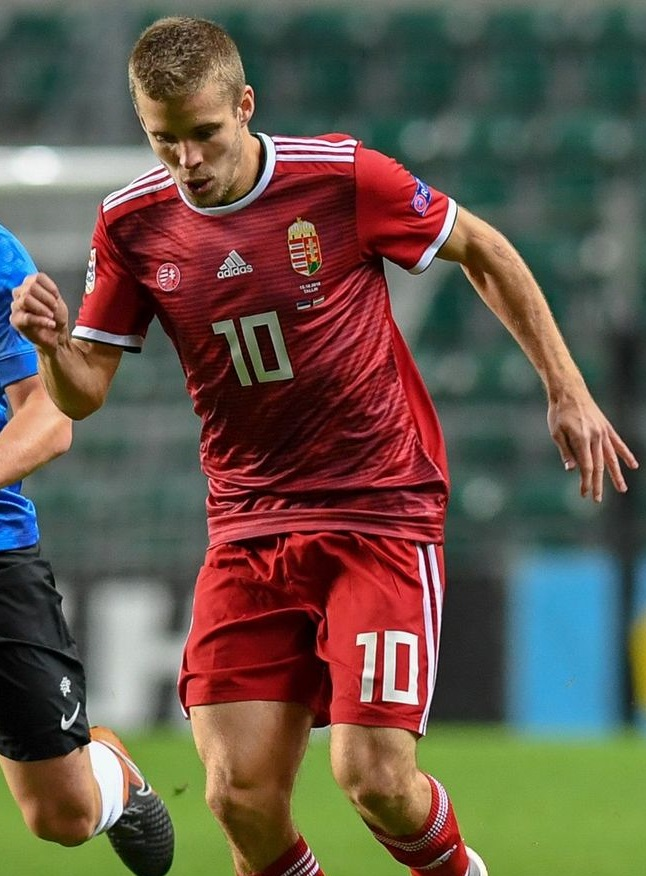
- Kovács playing for Hungary in 2018

Personal information
- Full name: István Ádám Kovács
- Date of birth: 27 March 1992 (age 34)
- Place of birth: Szombathely, Hungary
- Height: 1.73 m (5 ft 8 in)
- Position: Attacking midfielder

Youth career
- 2003–2008: Haladás

Senior career*
Years	Team	Apps	(Gls)
2008–2012	Haladás II	44	(7)
2008–2012	Haladás	18	(2)
2012–2022	Fehérvár	218	(21)
2016–2022	Fehérvár II	14	(2)
2022	Győr	15	(2)
Total		309	(34)

International career
2008–2009	Hungary U17	5	(0)
2010	Hungary U18	2	(0)
2010–2011	Hungary U19	7	(2)
2011	Hungary U20	3	(1)
2011–2014	Hungary U21	10	(1)
2013–2019	Hungary	15	(0)
- * Club domestic league appearances and goals

István Ádám Kovács (born 27 March 1992) is a Hungarian former professional footballer who played as a midfielder.

Kovács won 15 caps with the Hungary national team.

== International career ==
On 22 March 2013, he made his international debut for Hungary as he came on as a substitute against Romania in the 79th minute.

== Club statistics ==
Appearances and goals by club, season and competition
Club	Season	League			National cup (Note: Includes Magyar Kupa)		League cup (Note: Includes Ligakupa)		Europe		Other		Total	
Club	Season	Division	Apps	Goals	Apps	Goals	Apps	Goals	Apps	Goals	Apps	Goals	Apps	Goals
Haladás II	2008–09	Nemzeti Bajnokság III	21	4	—		—		—		—		21	4
Haladás II	2009–10	Nemzeti Bajnokság III	16	1	—		—		—		—		16	1
Haladás II	2010–11	Nemzeti Bajnokság III	7	2	—		—		—		—		7	2
Haladás II	Total		44	7	—		—		—		—		44	7
Haladás	2008–09	Nemzeti Bajnokság I	1	0	—		7	0	—		—		8	0
Haladás	2009–10	Nemzeti Bajnokság I	1	0	1	0	4	0	—		—		6	0
Haladás	2010–11	Nemzeti Bajnokság I	1	0	1	0	1	0	—		—		3	0
Haladás	2011–12	Nemzeti Bajnokság I	15	2	2	0	1	0	—		—		18	2
Haladás	Total		18	2	4	0	13	0	—		—		35	2
Fehérvár	2011–12	Nemzeti Bajnokság I	10	0	4	0	4	0	—		—		18	0
Fehérvár	2012–13	Nemzeti Bajnokság I	29	4	6	2	4	0	8 (Note: Appearance in UEFA Europa League)	0	1 (Note: Appearance in Szuperkupa)	1	48	7
Fehérvár	2013–14	Nemzeti Bajnokság I	23	1	2	0	2	0	2	0	—		29	1
Fehérvár	2014–15	Nemzeti Bajnokság I	26	5	6	0	5	1	—		—		37	6
Fehérvár	2015–16	Nemzeti Bajnokság I	26	4	5	1	—		6 (Note: Four appearances in UEFA Champions League, two appearances in UEFA Europa League)	0	1	0	38	5
Fehérvár	2016–17	Nemzeti Bajnokság I	12	0	3	1	—		2	1	—		17	2
Fehérvár	2017–18	Nemzeti Bajnokság I	20	1	2	0	—		1	0	—		23	1
Fehérvár	2018–19	Nemzeti Bajnokság I	32	4	9	0	—		14 (Note: Eight appearances in UEFA Champions League, six appearances in UEFA Europa League)	0	—		55	4
Fehérvár	2019–20	Nemzeti Bajnokság I	30	2	5	0	—		2	0	—		37	2
Fehérvár	2020–21	Nemzeti Bajnokság I	3	0	1	0	—		0	0	—		4	0
Fehérvár	2021–22	Nemzeti Bajnokság I	7	0	1	0	—		1 (Note: Appearance in UEFA Europa Conference League)	0	—		9	0
Fehérvár	Total		218	21	44	4	15	1	36	1	2	1	315	28
Fehérvár II	2016–17	Nemzeti Bajnokság III	3	0	—		—		—		—		3	0
Fehérvár II	2020–21	Nemzeti Bajnokság III	2	1	—		—		—		—		2	1
Fehérvár II	2021–22	Nemzeti Bajnokság III	9	1	—		—		—		—		9	1
Fehérvár II	Total		14	2	—		—		—		—		14	2
Győr	2022–23	Nemzeti Bajnokság II	15	2	2	0	—		—		—		17	2
Career total			309	34	50	4	28	1	36	1	2	1	425	41

== Honours ==
Videoton

- Nemzeti Bajnokság I: 2014–15, 2017–18
- Magyar Kupa: 2018–19
- Ligakupa: 2011–12
- Szuperkupa: 2012
