= Ádám Lang =

Hungarian footballer (born 1993)

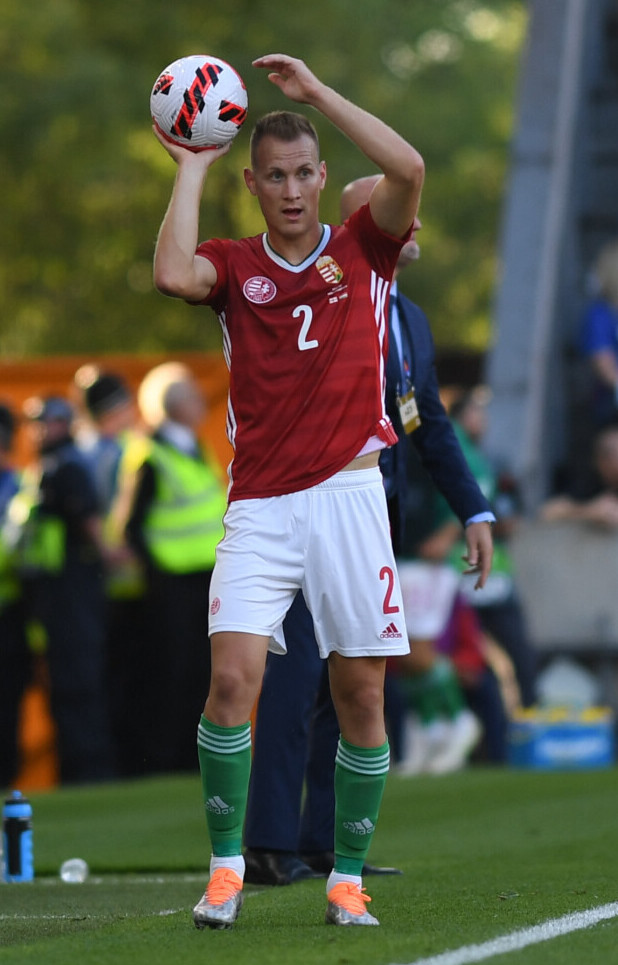
- Lang with Hungary in 2022

Personal information
- Full name: Ádám Lang
- Date of birth: 17 January 1993 (age 33)
- Place of birth: Veszprém, Hungary
- Height: 1.88 m (6 ft 2 in)
- Position: Centre back

Team information
- Current team: Debreceni VSC
- Number: 26

Youth career
- 2004–2008: Veszprém

Senior career*
Years	Team	Apps	(Gls)
2008–2012	Veszprém	44	(3)
2012–2015	Győr	57	(1)
2015–2016	Videoton	23	(2)
2016–2018	Dijon	22	(0)
2017	Dijon II	1	(0)
2018	→ Nancy (loan)	14	(0)
2018–2019	CFR Cluj	18	(0)
2019–2025	Omonia	115	(4)
2025–	Debrecen	46	(1)

International career^{‡}
2011–2012	Hungary U19	5	(0)
2013–2014	Hungary U21	5	(0)
2014–2024	Hungary	70	(2)
- * Club domestic league appearances and goals as of 30 May 2026 ‡ National team caps and goals as of 15 June 2024 (UTC)

Ádám Lang (born 17 January 1993) is a Hungarian professional footballer who plays as a central defender for Hungarian Nemzeti Bajnokság club Debreceni VSC.

== Club career ==
=== Győr ===
Born in Veszprém, Lang was signed in 2012 by Hungarian League club Győri ETO FC.

He scored his first Hungarian League goal in the 2013–14 Nemzeti Bajnokság I season against Mezőkövesd-Zsóry SE in the 28th minute at ETO Park.

=== Videoton ===
On 24 June 2015, Lang was signed by Hungarian League club Videoton FC.

On 21 August 2016, he scored his first goal in the 2016–17 Nemzeti Bajnokság I in a 5–1 victory for Videoton over Debreceni VSC. Lang scored in the 23rd minute and was able to repeat his feat with another goal in the same match in the 56th minute.

=== Dijon ===
Lang signed with Dijon FCO in September 2016; his signing was registered minutes before the transfer window deadline.

On 20 September 2016, he played his first match in the Ligue 1 at the Parc des Princes, Paris, France against Paris Saint-Germain F.C. in the 2016–17 Ligue 1 season. In the 15th minute he scored an own goal and the match ended with a 3–0 defeat for Dijon.

=== CFR Cluj ===
Lang penned a deal with Romanian club CFR Cluj on 4 July 2018.

=== Omonia ===
On 27 June 2019, Lang joined Cypriot club Omonia on a three-year deal. In these three years, he won the Cypriot League, the Cup and the Super Cup. He also helped Omonia qualify to, and played in the group stages of the 2020-21 Europa League and the 2021–22 Europa Conference League, the first two times the club had made it to the group stage of a European competition.

In January 2022, he extended his contract until Summer 2025, and expressed his happiness at Omonia. On 17 April 2022, he made his 100th appearance for the club, in a 1–0 home win against Ethnikos Achna in the Cypriot First Division.

On 29 March 2024, he broke his leg during training. He has to miss 1 month, according to the doctors of his club. Coming back from the injury he was out for the rest of the season due to sinus infection. This is reported from Omonia official account.

=== Debrecen ===
On 17 January 2025, Lang was signed by Hungarian League club Debreceni VSC on a two and half-year deal.

== International career ==
On 22 May 2014, Lang played his first match for the Hungary national team against Denmark in a 2–2 draw friendly match at the Nagyerdei Stadion, Debrecen.

He played four times during Hungary's UEFA Euro 2016 qualifying campaign, including starting both legs of the play-off with Norway, which saw the Magyars qualify for their first major tournament finals in 30 years and their first European Championship since UEFA Euro 1972.

Lang was selected for Hungary's UEFA Euro 2016 squad. On 14 June 2016, he started and played the full match of Hungary's 2–0 win over rivals Austria in Bordeaux. He went on to play the full 90 minutes against both Iceland and Portugal, as Hungary qualified for the knockout stage as Group F winners, unbeaten in three matches. On 26 June, Lang played the full match against Belgium in Toulouse, as Hungary were beaten 4–0 in the round of 16.

On 13 November 2016, Lang scored his first goal for Hungary in a 4–0 win over Andorra during 2018 FIFA World Cup qualification.

On 1 June 2021, Lang was included in the final 26-man squad to represent Hungary at the rescheduled UEFA Euro 2020 tournament. He was an unused substitute in all three of the team's Group F matches, as the Magyars lost to Portugal and drew with both France and Germany.

On 14 May 2024, Lang was named in Hungary's squad for UEFA Euro 2024. On 4 June 2024, he scored the equalizer in a friendly match against Ireland at the Aviva Stadium, Dublin. On 16 June, he started the team's opening match of the tournament against Switzerland, playing the first 45 minutes of the 3–1 loss before being substituted for Bendegúz Bolla at half time. He was an unused substitute against both Germany and Scotland as Hungary finished third in Group A and were eliminated from the tournament.

On 27 August 2024, Marco Rossi, the head coach of the national team, announced the squad for the matches of the 2024–25 UEFA Nations League against Germany and Bosnia and Hercegovina and Lang was not included. One possible reason for his omission was that Lang did not play in his club.

== Career statistics ==
=== Club ===
As of match played 23 May 2025

Appearances and goals by club, season and competition
Club	Season	League			National cup (Note: Includes Magyar Kupa, Coupe de France, Cupa României, Cypriot Cup)		League cup (Note: Includes Ligakupa, Coupe de la Ligue)		Europe		Other		Total	
Club	Season	Division	Apps	Goals	Apps	Goals	Apps	Goals	Apps	Goals	Apps	Goals	Apps	Goals
Veszprém	2008–09	Nemzeti Bajnokság III	2	0	0	0	0	0	—		—		2	0
Veszprém	2009–10	Nemzeti Bajnokság III	0	0	2	0	0	0	—		—		2	0
Veszprém	2010–11	Nemzeti Bajnokság II	17	1	2	0	0	0	—		—		19	1
Veszprém	2011–12	Nemzeti Bajnokság II	25	2	3	0	0	0	—		—		28	2
Veszprém	Total		44	3	7	0	0	0	—		—		51	3
Győr	2012–13	Nemzeti Bajnokság I	4	0	3	0	5	0	—		—		12	0
Győr	2013–14	Nemzeti Bajnokság I	24	1	3	0	1	0	0	0	—		28	1
Győr	2014–15	Nemzeti Bajnokság I	29	0	4	0	2	0	1 (Note: Appearances in UEFA Europa League)	0	—		36	0
Győr	Total		57	1	10	0	8	0	1	0	—		76	1
Videton	2015–16	Nemzeti Bajnokság I	16	0	3	0	—		4 (Note: Three appearances in UEFA Champions League, one appearance in UEFA Europa League)	0	—		23	0
Videton	2016–17	Nemzeti Bajnokság I	7	2	0	0	—		5	0	—		12	2
Videton	Total		23	2	3	0	—		9	0	—		35	2
Dijon	2016–17	Ligue 1	19	0	1	0	0	0	—		—		20	0
Dijon	2017–18	Ligue 1	3	0	0	0	1	0	—		—		4	0
Dijon	Total		22	0	1	0	1	0	—		—		24	0
Nancy (loan)	2017–18	Ligue 2	14	0	0	0	—		—		—		14	0
CFR Cluj	2018–19	Liga I	18	0	5	0	0	0	1	0	—		24	0
Omonia	2019–20	Cypriot First Division	22	0	3	0	—		—		—		25	0
Omonia	2020–21	Cypriot First Division	25	0	2	0	—		11 (Note: Five appearances in UEFA Champions League, six appearances in UEFA Europa League)	0	—		38	0
Omonia	2021–22	Cypriot First Division	20	2	6	1	—		12 (Note: Two appearances in UEFA Champions League, four appearances in UEFA Europa League, six appearances in UEFA Europa Conference League)	0	1 (Note: Appearance in Cypriot Super Cup)	0	39	3
Omonia	2022–23	Cypriot First Division	29	1	1	0	—		5	0	1	0	36	1
Omonia	2023–24	Cypriot First Division	15	0	1	0	—		4 (Note: Appearances in UEFA Europa Conference League)	1	1	0	21	1
Omonia	2024–25	Cypriot First Division	4	1	0	0	—		3	0	—		7	1
Omonia	Total		115	4	13	1	—		35	1	3	0	166	6
Debrecen	2024–25	Nemzeti Bajnokság I	16	0	—		—		—		—		16	0
Debrecen	Total		16	0	0	0	—		0	0	—		16	0
Career total			309	10	39	1	9	0	46	1	3	0	406	12

=== International ===
As of match played 15 June 2024

Appearances and goals by national team and year
National team	Year	Apps	Goals
Hungary	2014	4	0
Hungary	2015	4	0
Hungary	2016	10	1
Hungary	2017	4	0
Hungary	2018	3	0
Hungary	2019	5	0
Hungary	2020	6	0
Hungary	2021	9	0
Hungary	2022	10	0
Hungary	2023	10	0
Hungary	2024	5	1
Total		70	2

Scores and results list Hungary's goal tally first, score column indicates score after each Lang goal.

List of international goals scored by Ádám Lang
No.	Date	Venue	Opponent	Cap	Score	Result	Competition
1	13 November 2016	Groupama Arena, Budapest, Hungary	Andorra	18	2–0	4–0	2018 FIFA World Cup qualification
2	4 June 2024	Aviva Stadium, Dublin, Ireland	Republic of Ireland	68	1–1	1–2	Friendly

== Honours ==
Győr

- Nemzeti Bajnokság I: 2012–13
- Szuperkupa: 2013
- Hungarian Cup runner-up: 2012–13

Videoton

- Szuperkupa runner-up: 2015

CFR Cluj

- Liga I: 2018–19
- Supercupa României: 2018

Omonia

- Cypriot First Division: 2020–21
- Cypriot Cup: 2021–22, 2022–23
- Cypriot Super Cup: 2021
