= Domont =

- Commune
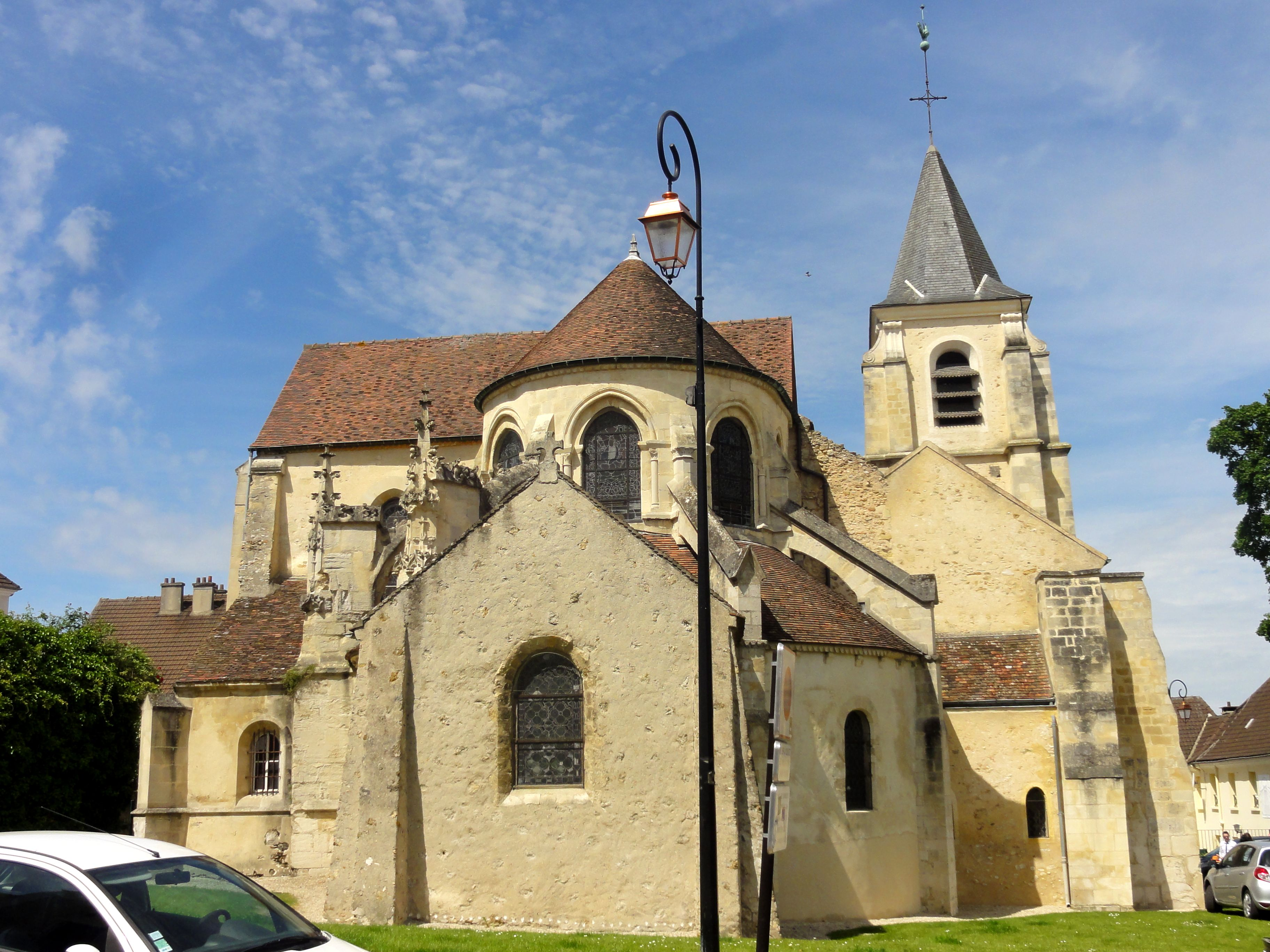
- Church of St Madeleine, Domont

- Coat of arms
- Location of Domont
- Location within France Location within Île-de-France (region)
- Coordinates: 49°01′42″N 2°19′39″E
- Country: France
- Region: Île-de-France
- Department: Val-d'Oise
- Arrondissement: Sarcelles
- Canton: Domont
- Intercommunality: CA Plaine Vallée

Government
  - Mayor (2020–2026): Frédéric Bourdin
- Area^{1}: 8.33 km^{2} (3.22 sq mi)
- Population (2023): 16,065
  - Density: 1,930/km^{2} (4,990/sq mi)
- Time zone: UTC+01:00 (CET)
  - Summer (DST): UTC+02:00 (CEST)
- INSEE/Postal code: 95199 /95330
- ^{1} French Land Register data, which excludes lakes, ponds, glaciers > 1 km^{2} (0.386 sq mi or 247 acres) and river estuaries.

Domont (French pronunciation: [dɔmɔ̃]) is a commune in the Val-d'Oise department and Île-de-France region of France. It is twinned with the Leicestershire town of Shepshed. Domont Station has rail connections to Persan, Luzarches, Sarcelles and Paris.

== Population ==
Historical population
Year	Pop.	±% p.a.
1968	9,016	—
1975	10,897	+2.74%
1982	11,047	+0.20%
1990	13,226	+2.28%
1999	14,883	+1.32%
2007	14,755	−0.11%
2012	15,213	+0.61%
2017	15,514	+0.39%
2023	16,065	+0.58%
Source: INSEE

== Twin towns — sister cities ==
Domont is twinned with:

- Germering, Germany (1984)
- (England) Shepshed, United Kingdom (1989)
- Wolsztyn, Poland (2005)
- Buja, Italy (2009)

== Notable people from Domont ==
- Bédi Buval, footballer
- Jean-Pierre Changeux, neuroscientist
- Yoann Djidonou, footballer
- Rémi Maréval, footballer
- Bertrand Ndzomo, footballer
- Eugene Jules Houdry, inventor
- Carole Sinoquet, hammer throwing athlete

== See also ==
- Communes of the Val-d'Oise department
