= Carole Sinoquet =

French athletics competitor

Personal information
- Born: 7 June 1975 (age 50) Domont, France
- Years active: 1990s
- Height: 173 cm (5 ft 8 in)
- Weight: 92 kg (203 lb)

Sport
- Country: France
- Sport: Athletics
- Event: Hammer throw

Carole Sinoquet (born 7 June 1975 in Domont) is a former French athlete, who specialized in the hammer throw.

== Biography ==
She won two titles of champion of France in the hammer throw in 1995 and 1996.

In 1996, she improved on four occasions French hammer throw record successively bringing it to 57.06 m, 57.16 m, 57.32 m and 57.54 m.

=== Prize list ===
- French Championships in Athletics :
  - 2-time winner in the hammer throw 1995 and 1996.

=== Records ===
Personal Bests
Event	Performance	Location	Date
Hammer throw	57.54 m		1996
