= Bertrand N'Dzomo =

French footballer (born 1985)

Personal information
- Date of birth: 18 June 1985 (age 41)
- Place of birth: Domont, France
- Height: 1.77 m (5 ft 10 in)
- Position: Midfielder

Team information
- Current team: FC Forward Morges

Senior career*
Years	Team	Apps	(Gls)
2004–2007	Le Mans	1	(0)
2007–2009	Yverdon-Sport	61	(1)
2009–2010	Lausanne-Sport	57	(2)
2010–2012	Nyon	57	(1)
2012–2013	Fribourg	29	(1)
2013–2015	Schaffhausen	64	(0)
2015–2017	Le Mont	55	(0)
2017–2018	La Chaux-de-Fonds	29	(0)
2018–2019	Yverdon-Sport	28	(0)
2019–	FC Forward Morges	12	(0)
- * Club domestic league appearances and goals as of 01:01, 9 November 2019 (UTC)

Bertrand N'Dzomo (born 18 June 1985) is a French footballer currently playing for FC Forward Morges.
