= Kees Luijckx =

Dutch footballer (born 1986)

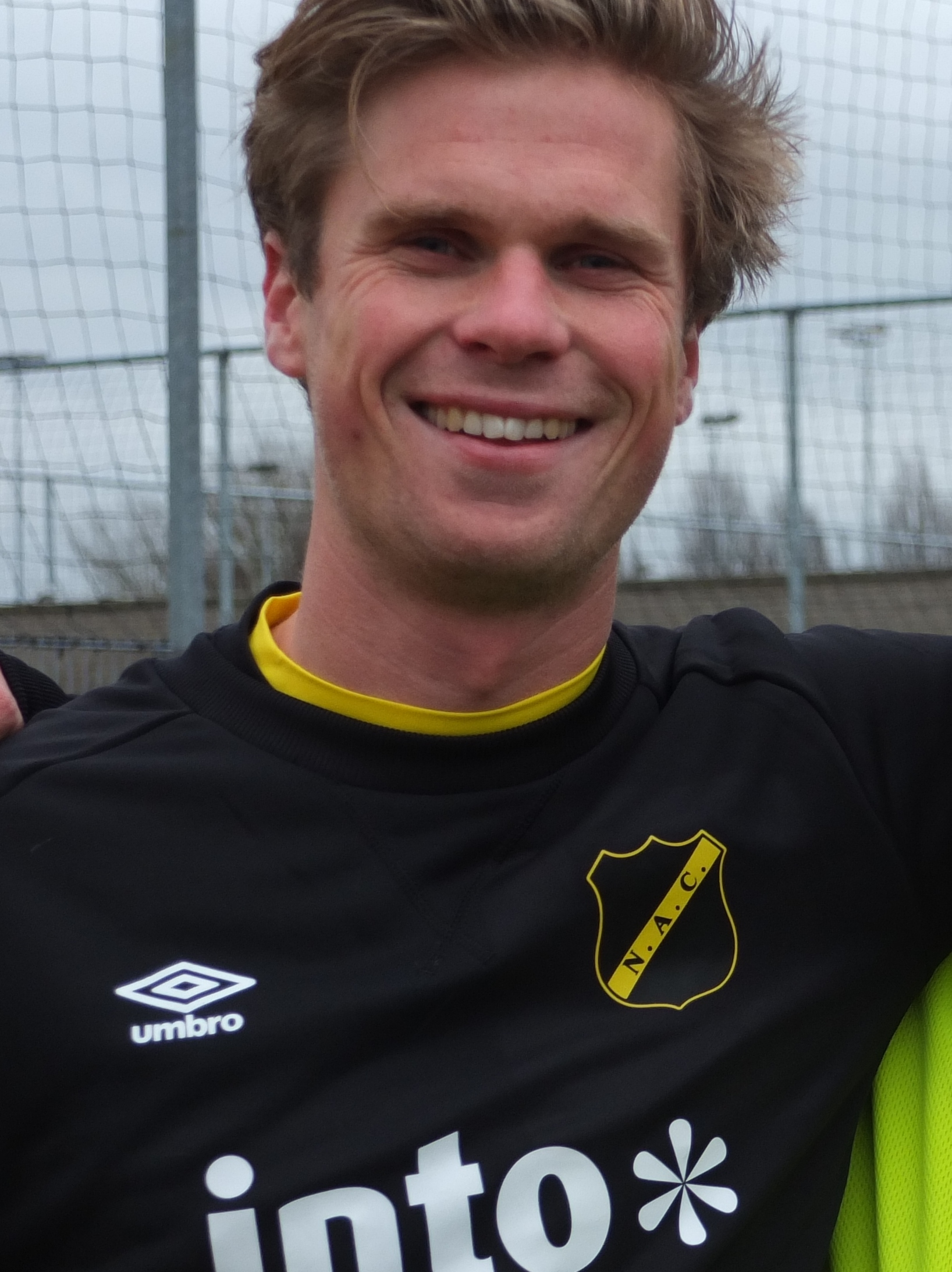
- Luijckx at NAC Breda in January 2015

Personal information
- Date of birth: 11 February 1986 (age 40)
- Place of birth: Beverwijk, Netherlands
- Height: 1.87 m (6 ft 2 in)
- Position: Centre-back

Youth career
- 1992–1996: Vitesse 1922
- 1996–2006: AZ

Senior career*
Years	Team	Apps	(Gls)
2006–2010	AZ	18	(0)
2007–2008	→ Excelsior (loan)	44	(3)
2010	→ ADO Den Haag (loan)	16	(2)
2010–2013	NAC Breda	92	(10)
2013–2014	Roda JC Kerkrade	28	(2)
2014–2015	Niki Volos	10	(0)
2015	Videoton	7	(0)
2015–2020	SønderjyskE	124	(12)
2020	Silkeborg	8	(0)
2020–2021	Roda JC Kerkrade	36	(4)

International career
2006–2008	Netherlands U21	7	(0)
2009	Netherlands B	2	(0)
- * Club domestic league appearances and goals

Kees Luijckx (Dutch pronunciation: [keːs ˈlœyks]; born 11 February 1986) is a Dutch former professional footballer who played as a centre-back. He earned 7 caps with the Netherlands U21 youth team.

== Club career ==
Born in Beverwijk, North Holland. Luijckx began his career in his hometown Castricum with Vitesse 1922 before being scouted by AZ in 1996. He initially played for the youth side and was then promoted to AZ's first team in the Eredivisie. Having made one league appearance in a year, he was loaned out to S.B.V. Excelsior in July 2007. He left Excelsior after only two games in the season 2007–2008 and returned to AZ, where he played 15 matches in the 2008–2009 season and won the 2008–09 Eredivisie. On 26 May 2009, his club announced they were planning without him and he would be searching a new club.

In January 2010, Luijckx signed a three-year contract with NAC Breda joining the club in July 2010.

In 2015, he joined Videoton, Hungary's reigning champion.

On 20 September 2015, Luijckx, who was a free agent, signed a half-year contract with Danish Superliga-side SønderjyskE. In January 2020, he joined Silkeborg IF on a contract for the rest of the season.

On 17 July 2020, Luijckx returned to Roda JC Kerkrade on a one-year contract.

== International career ==
Luijckx was part of the Dutch Olympic side participating in the Beijing 2008 Olympics. He played as a substitute in the pre-Olympic ING Cup in Hong Kong, arriving in the second half for the injured Kew Jaliens.

== Career statistics ==
=== Club ===
As of 6 June 2018

Appearances and goals by club, season and competition
Club	Season	League			Cup^{1}		Continental^{2}		Other^{3}		Total	
Club	Season	Division	Apps	Goals	Apps	Goals	Apps	Goals	Apps	Goals	Apps	Goals
AZ	2006–07	Eredivisie	2	0	—		—		—		2	0
AZ	Total		2	0	0	0	0	0	0	0	2	0
Excelsior	2006–07	Eredivisie	12	0	0	0	—		4	0	16	0
Excelsior	2007–08	Eredivisie	32	3	2	1	—		—		34	4
Excelsior	Total		44	3	2	1	0	0	4	0	50	4
AZ	2008–09	Eredivisie	15	0	2	0	—		—		17	0
AZ	2009–10	Eredivisie	3	0	—		1	0	—		4	0
AZ	Total		18	0	2	0	1	0	0	0	21	0
ADO Den Haag	2009–10	Eredivisie	16	2	—		—		—		16	2
ADO Den Haag	Total		16	2	0	0	0	0	0	0	16	2
NAC Breda	2010–11	Eredivisie	29	3	4	1	—		—		33	4
NAC Breda	2011–12	Eredivisie	29	3	0	0	—		—		29	3
NAC Breda	2012–13	Eredivisie	34	4	3	0	—		—		37	4
NAC Breda	Total		92	10	7	1	0	0	0	0	99	11
Roda JC	2013–14	Eredivisie	28	2	3	0	—		—		31	2
Roda JC	Total		28	2	3	0	0	0	0	0	31	2
Niki Volos	2014–15	Super League Greece	10	0	0	0	—		—		10	0
Niki Volos	Total		10	0	0	0	0	0	0	0	10	0
Videoton	2014–15	Nemzeti Bajnokság I	2	0	1	0	—		—		10	0
Videoton	2015–16	Nemzeti Bajnokság I	5	0	0	0	5	0	—		10	0
Videoton	Total		7	0	1	0	5	0	0	0	20	0
SønderjyskE	2015–16	Danish Superliga	20	1	3	1	—		—		23	2
SønderjyskE	2016–17	Danish Superliga	16	2	1	0	1	0	8	0	26	2
SønderjyskE	2017–18	Danish Superliga	24	6	1	1	—		9	1	34	8
SønderjyskE	Total		60	9	5	2	1	0	17	1	83	12
Career total			277	26	20	4	7	0	21	1	325	31

Notes

^{1} Includes KNVB Cup. ^{2} Includes UEFA Champions League and UEFA Europa League matches. ^{3} Includes the Johan Cruijff Shield, Eredivisie playoffs, and Danish Superliga championship playoff matches.
