= Zsolt Tar =

Hungarian footballer

Personal information
- Full name: Zsolt Tar
- Date of birth: 13 February 1993 (age 33)
- Place of birth: Kunhegyes, Hungary
- Height: 1.90 m (6 ft 3 in)
- Position: Centre back

Team information
- Current team: Ajka
- Number: 34

Youth career
- 2003–2008: Kunhegyes
- 2008–2011: Felcsút
- 2011–2013: Videoton

Senior career*
Years	Team	Apps	(Gls)
2012–2015	Videoton II	41	(3)
2013–2015	Videoton	3	(0)
2014–2017	→ Puskás Akadémia (loan)	32	(1)
2014–2017	→ Puskás Akadémia II (loan)	27	(3)
2017–2018	→ Csákvári (loan)	33	(3)
2018–2020	Győr	26	(1)
2020–	Ajka	178	(7)

International career
2011–2012	Hungary U19	6	(0)
- * Club domestic league appearances and goals as of 31 May 2026

Zsolt Tar (born 13 February 1993) is a Hungarian professional footballer who plays for FC Ajka.

== Career statistics ==
Appearances and goals by club, season and competition
Club	Season	League			Cup		League Cup		Europe		Total	
Club	Season	Division	Apps	Goals	Apps	Goals	Apps	Goals	Apps	Goals	Apps	Goals
Videoton II
Videoton II	2012–13	Nemzeti Bajnokság III	24	3	—		—		—		24	3
Videoton II	2013–14	Nemzeti Bajnokság III	17	0	—		—		—		17	0
Videoton II	Total		41	3	0	0	0	0	0	0	41	3
Videoton
Videoton	2012–13	Nemzeti Bajnokság I	0	0	0	0	2	1	0	0	2	1
Videoton	2013–14	Nemzeti Bajnokság I	3	0	1	0	7	1	0	0	11	1
Videoton	Total		3	0	1	0	9	2	0	0	13	2
Puskás Akadémia
Puskás Akadémia	2014–15	Nemzeti Bajnokság I	16	0	3	0	6	0	—		25	0
Puskás Akadémia	2015–16	Nemzeti Bajnokság I	9	1	2	0	—		—		11	1
Puskás Akadémia	2016–17	Nemzeti Bajnokság II	7	0	3	0	—		—		10	0
Puskás Akadémia	Total		32	1	8	0	6	0	0	0	46	1
Puskás Akadémia II
Puskás Akadémia II	2015–16	Nemzeti Bajnokság III	14	1	—		—		—		14	1
Puskás Akadémia II	2016–17	Nemzeti Bajnokság III	13	2	—		—		—		13	2
Puskás Akadémia II	Total		27	3	0	0	0	0	0	0	27	3
Csákvár	2017–18	Nemzeti Bajnokság II	33	3	0	0	—		—		33	3
Győr
Győr	2018–19	Nemzeti Bajnokság II	25	1	1	0	—		—		26	1
Győr	2019–20	Nemzeti Bajnokság II	1	0	0	0	—		—		1	0
Győr	Total		26	1	1	0	0	0	0	0	27	1
Ajka
Ajka	2019–20	Nemzeti Bajnokság II	6	0	0	0	—		—		6	0
Ajka	2020–21	Nemzeti Bajnokság II	3	0	0	0	—		—		3	0
Ajka	Total		9	0	0	0	0	0	0	0	9	0
Career total			171	11	10	0	15	2	0	0	196	13

Updated to games played as of 9 August 2020.
