= Alhassane Soumah =

Guinean footballer

Personal information
- Full name: Alhassane Soumah
- Date of birth: 2 March 1998 (age 28)
- Place of birth: Conakry, Guinea
- Height: 1.80 m (5 ft 11 in)
- Position: Attacking midfielder

Youth career
- –2013: Santarcangelo
- 2013–2015: Juventus
- 2015: → Cesena (loan)

Senior career*
| Years | Team | Apps | (Gls) |
| 2015–2019 | Juventus | 0 | (0) |
| 2015–2016 | → Vidi (loan) | 11 | (0) |
| 2016–2017 | → Cercle Brugge (loan) | 18 | (1) |
| 2017–2018 | → Chiasso (loan) | 8 | (1) |
| 2018–2019 | → Wattens (loan) | 14 | (0) |
- * Club domestic league appearances and goals as of 29 May 2019

Alhassane Soumah (born 2 March 1996) is a Guinean professional footballer who plays as an attacking midfielder.

== Career ==
On 25 July 2015, Soumah made his senior debut for Vidi, playing 35 minutes as a substitute in a 1–0 loss to Szombathelyi Haladás.

On 7 July 2018, Soumah joined Austrian club Wattens on a season-long loan deal.
