= Rémi Maréval =

Martiniquais footballer (born 1983)

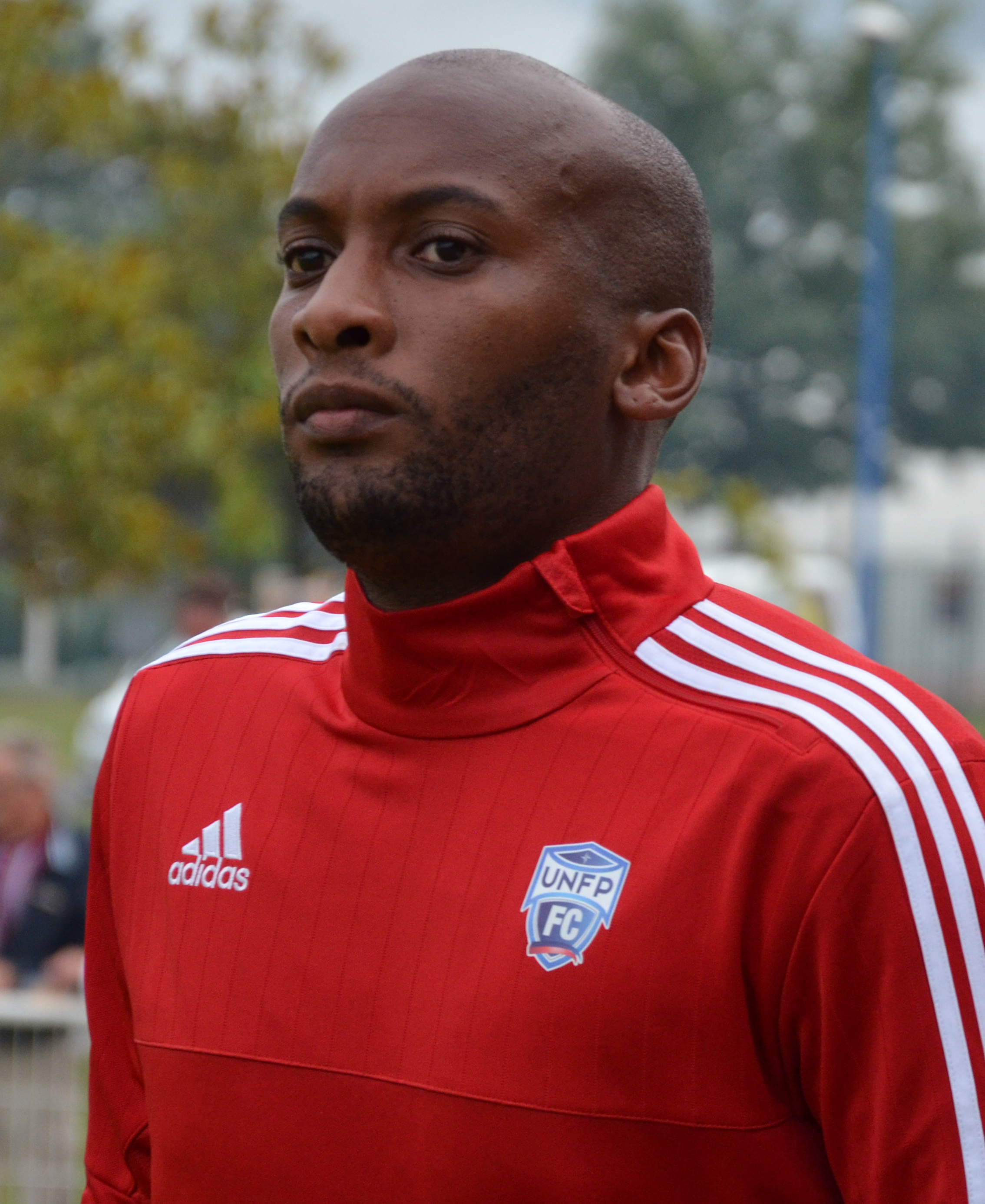
- Maréval in 2016

Personal information
- Date of birth: 24 February 1983 (age 43)
- Place of birth: Domont, France
- Height: 1.82 m (6 ft 0 in)
- Position: Defender

Youth career
- 1997–2001: US Chantilly

Senior career*
Years	Team	Apps	(Gls)
2001–2003	AS Beauvais	38	(1)
2004	Oldham Athletic	0	(0)
2004–2005	Gazélec Ajaccio	37	(1)
2005–2007	Tours	64	(2)
2007–2010	Nantes	96	(2)
2010–2012	Zulte Waregem	40	(6)
2012–2014	Gent	32	(4)
2014	Maccabi Tel Aviv	8	(1)
2015	Videoton FC	5	(0)
Total		319	(17)

International career
2014	Martinique	0	(0)
- * Club domestic league appearances and goals

Rémi Maréval (born 24 February 1983) is a Martiniquais former professional footballer who played as a defender.

== Career ==
Born in Domont, Maréval began his career at the age of 14 in the US Chantilly's youth system and signed for Ligue 2 team AS Beauvais in the summer of 2001. After two and a half years with AS Beauvais, where he played 38 games and scored one goal, Maréval signed for Oldham Athletic in January 2004. In 2004, after half a year in England with Oldham Athletic, he returned to France and signed for Gazélec Ajaccio. After a successful season with 37 games and one goal for Gazélec Ajaccio, he joined Tours, but played only 33 matches in two seasons. In July 2007, Maréval again moved, this time to FC Nantes.

On 2 February 2014, Israel Premier League club Maccabi Tel Aviv announced Maréval's arrival in a contract until the end of the 2013–14 season.

== Trivia ==
Maréval had one of his most memorable moments against Olympique de Marseille, scoring a goal from more than 30 metres. He scored another memorable goal against Nîmes Olympique from 60 metres in September 2009. Coming after just eight seconds, the goal was the fastest goal in the history of the French Ligue 2.
