= Filipe Oliveira (footballer, born 1984) =

Portuguese footballer

Personal information
- Full name: Filipe Vilaça de Oliveira
- Date of birth: 27 May 1984 (age 42)
- Place of birth: Braga, Portugal
- Height: 1.78 m (5 ft 10 in)
- Position: Midfielder

Youth career
- 1994–1999: Braga
- 1999–2001: Porto
- 2001–2002: Chelsea

Senior career*
Years	Team	Apps	(Gls)
2002–2006	Chelsea	5	(0)
2004–2005	→ Preston North End (loan)	5	(0)
2005–2006	→ Marítimo (loan)	23	(0)
2006–2007	Marítimo	24	(1)
2007–2008	Leixões	24	(0)
2008–2010	Braga	21	(0)
2010–2012	Parma	1	(0)
2010	→ Torino (loan)	4	(0)
2011–2012	→ Videoton (loan)	23	(2)
2012–2016	Videoton	94	(14)
2017	Anorthosis	14	(3)
2018	Sepsi OSK	16	(0)
Total		254	(20)

International career
2000	Portugal U15	5	(1)
2000–2001	Portugal U16	8	(3)
2002	Portugal U18	5	(2)
2002–2003	Portugal U19	12	(2)
2004	Portugal U20	3	(1)
2004–2007	Portugal U21	21	(4)
2006–2007	Portugal B	2	(0)
- * Club domestic league appearances and goals

Filipe Vilaça de Oliveira (born 27 May 1984) is a Portuguese former professional footballer who played mainly as a right midfielder but also as an attacking right-back.

After starting out at Chelsea as a senior, he went on to play mostly for Hungarian club Videoton. In his country's Primeira Liga, he appeared in 92 matches over five seasons.

== Club career ==
Born in Braga, Oliveira started his career with local S.C. Braga, joining their youth system at the age of 10. Still in his teens, he was bought by Chelsea for a reported cost of £500,000, making his Premier League debut on 19 October 2002 in a 3–0 away win over Manchester City where he played one minute after coming on as a substitute for two-time scorer Gianfranco Zola; however, he never managed to break into the main squad and, during one month, served a spell at Preston North End.

Oliveira played once for the Blues in 2004–05, in the last game against Newcastle United where he also came off the bench. In the summer of 2005 he was loaned to C.S. Marítimo, with Nuno Morais joining in the same situation; after the season finished, he agreed to be released from his contract and signed with the Madeira-based club.

At the end of 2006–07, which included his only Primeira Liga goal in a 3–2 away loss against neighbours C.D. Nacional, Oliveira was released and joined Leixões SC, recently returned to the top flight after several decades of absence. In June 2008, after having helped the Matosinhos team to retain their status, he returned to Braga now as a senior player, signing a two-year contract. He appeared very rarely throughout his debut campaign, one of his few chances being a 5–0 win at C.F. Os Belenenses.

After the January 2010 sale of starter João Pereira to Sporting CP, Oliveira became the first-choice right-back. He finished the season with 17 appearances, as the Minho side achieved a best-ever second place in the league.

In July 2010, Oliveira joined Parma FC – who paid K.A.S. Eupen a fee of €1 million (5% Solidarity Contribution included) – being called up to training camp on the 12th. Two weeks later, he was loaned to fellow Italians Torino FC for €600,000, with the Serie B club having an option to buy half of his contract subsequently; he was recalled from his spell in the following transfer window, only managing one official appearance during his first year (25 minutes in a 1–1 draw away to Cagliari Calcio, in Serie A's last round).

In early August 2011, Oliveira was sent on loan to Videoton FC in Hungary, and the move was made permanent at the end of the campaign. On 29 May 2015, after contributing 26 games, six goals and 11 assists as the team won the second Nemzeti Bajnokság I championship in their history, the 31-year-old renewed his contract for a further two seasons.

Oliveira switched countries again on 31 January 2017, joining Cypriot First Division's Anorthosis Famagusta FC until the end of the season. Nearly a year later, having been unemployed for half of that time, he signed for Sepsi OSK Sfântu Gheorghe who were aiming to stay in Romania's Liga I.

== International career ==
Oliveira represented Portugal at every youth level. He was part of the team that finished runners-up to Italy in the 2003 UEFA European Under-19 Championship.

In summer 2006, Oliveira appeared – with Chelsea and Marítimo teammate Morais – for the under-21s at the 2006 European Under-21 Championship, on home soil.

== Career statistics ==
Club	Season	League		Cup		League Cup		Europe		Total	
Club	Season	Apps	Goals	Apps	Goals	Apps	Goals	Apps	Goals	Apps	Goals
Chelsea	2002–03	3	0	0	0	1	0	1	0	5	0
Chelsea	2003–04	1	0	1	0	0	0	0	0	2	0
Chelsea	2004–05	1	0	0	0	0	0	0	0	1	0
Chelsea	Total	5	0	1	0	1	0	1	0	8	0
Preston North End	2004–05	5	0	0	0	0	0	0	0	5	0
Preston North End	Total	5	0	0	0	0	0	0	0	5	0
Marítimo	2005–06	23	0	2	0	0	0	0	0	25	0
Marítimo	2006–07	24	1	1	0	0	0	0	0	25	1
Marítimo	Total	47	1	3	0	0	0	0	0	50	1
Leixões	2007–08	24	0	3	0	1	0	0	0	28	0
Leixões	Total	24	0	3	0	1	0	0	0	28	0
Braga	2008–09	4	0	0	0	1	0	1	0	6	0
Braga	2009–10	17	0	2	1	2	0	0	0	21	1
Braga	Total	21	0	2	1	3	0	1	0	27	1
Parma	2010–11	1	0	0	0	0	0	0	0	1	0
Parma	Total	1	0	0	0	0	0	0	0	1	0
Torino	2010–11	4	0	2	0	0	0	0	0	6	0
Torino	Total	4	0	2	0	0	0	0	0	6	0
Videoton	2011–12	23	2	3	1	8	0	0	0	34	3
Videoton	2012–13	17	4	3	3	6	0	12	3	38	10
Videoton	2013–14	16	1	2	0	10	1	2	0	30	2
Videoton	2014–15	26	6	3	1	10	3	0	0	39	7
Videoton	2015–16	30	3	3	0	1 (Note: Appearance in Szuperkupa)	0	5	0	39	3
Videoton	2016–17	5	0	0	0	0	0	4	0	9	0
Videoton	Total	117	16	14	5	35	4	23	3	189	28
Anorthosis	2016–17	14	3	4	2	0	0	0	0	18	5
Anorthosis	Total	14	3	4	2	0	0	0	0	18	5
Sepsi OSK	2017–18	16	0	0	0	0	0	0	0	16	0
Sepsi OSK	Total	16	0	0	0	0	0	0	0	16	0
Career totals		254	20	29	8	40	4	25	3	348	35

== Honours ==
Videoton

- Nemzeti Bajnokság I: 2014–15
- Ligakupa: 2011–12
