= Juan Calatayud =

Spanish footballer (born 1979)

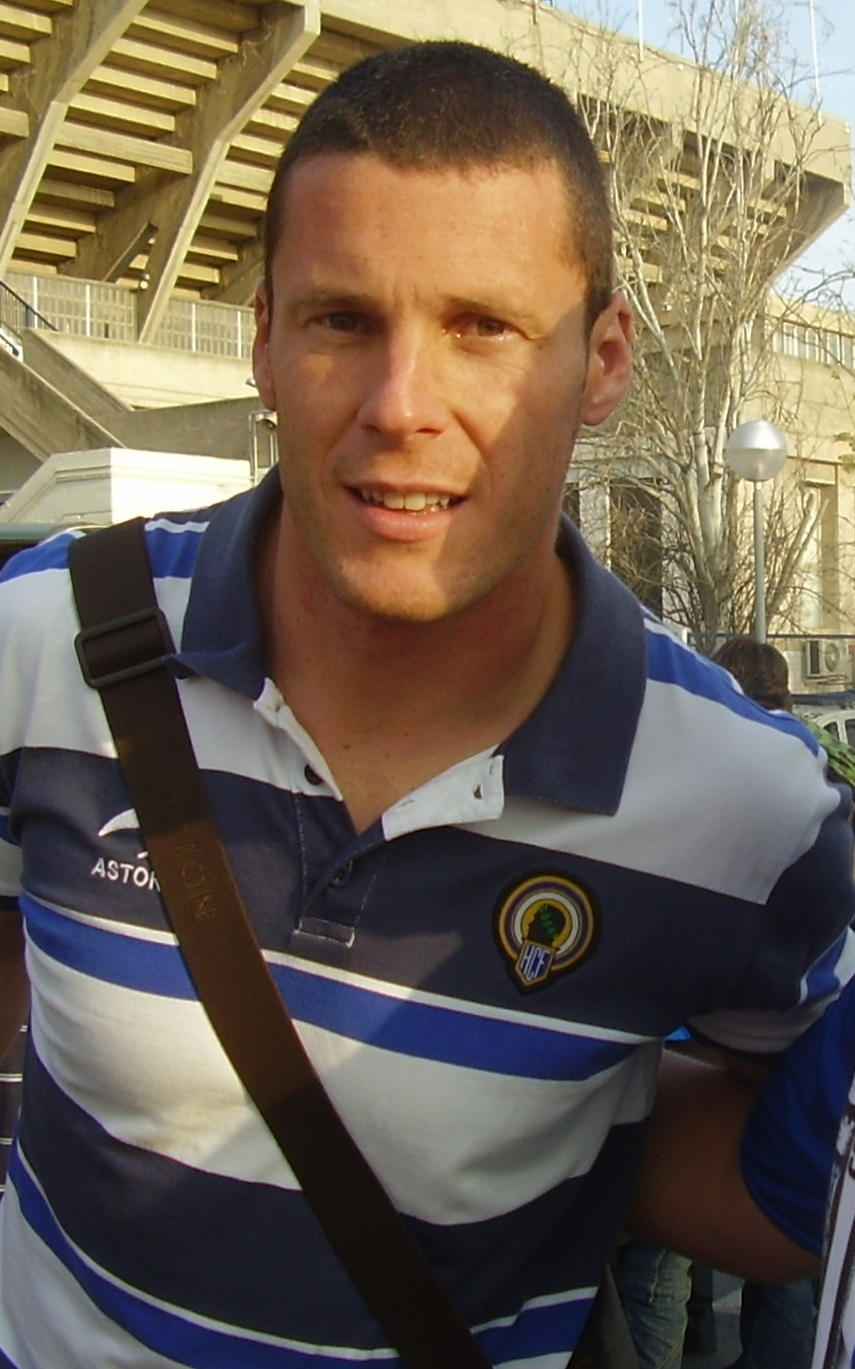
- Calatayud with Hércules in 2010

Personal information
- Full name: Juan Jesús Calatayud Sánchez
- Date of birth: 21 December 1979 (age 46)
- Place of birth: Antequera, Spain
- Height: 1.91 m (6 ft 3 in)
- Position: Goalkeeper

Youth career
- Málaga

Senior career*
Years	Team	Apps	(Gls)
1999–2003	Málaga B	102	(0)
2002	→ Algeciras (loan)	0	(0)
2003–2006	Málaga	36	(0)
2005–2006	→ Getafe (loan)	13	(0)
2006–2008	Racing Santander	7	(0)
2008–2011	Hércules	117	(0)
2011–2013	Mallorca	6	(0)
2013–2015	Videoton	59	(0)
2015	Atlético Kolkata	3	(0)
2016–2017	Antequera	35	(0)
Total		378	(0)
- * Club domestic league appearances and goals

Juan Jesús Calatayud Sánchez (born 21 December 1979) is a Spanish former professional footballer who played as a goalkeeper.

He played 96 matches in La Liga over the course of eight seasons, in representation of Málaga, Racing de Santander, Hércules and Mallorca. He also appeared for clubs in Hungary (winning the national championship with Videoton in 2015) and India.

== Club career ==
Calatayud was born in Antequera, Province of Málaga. After graduating from Málaga CF's youth system, and spending a few weeks in summer 2002 on loan to lowly Algeciras CF, he returned to the Andalusians' first team and went on to appear in 36 La Liga games over two seasons, his debut in the competition coming on 29 October 2003 in a 2–1 away loss against Athletic Bilbao. Subsequently, he represented, still in the top flight, Getafe CF (also loaned) and Racing de Santander, mostly as a backup or third choice; in 2007–08, whilst with the Cantabrians, he was not given a jersey and was forced to train separately from his teammates.

In July 2008, Calatayud joined Segunda División side Hércules CF on a two-year deal. He only missed one league match in his first year, as the club fell short of promotion by just three points.

Calatayud continued as Hércules' starter in 2009–10, keeping the most clean sheets in the whole league for the first half of the campaign. Eventually, even though he was not awarded the Ricardo Zamora Trophy, his team finished with the best defensive record in the league and returned to the top division after a 13-year absence.

Calatayud was again an undisputed starter in the 2010–11 season, but the Valencians were immediately relegated. In July, the 31-year-old returned to the top tier, signing with RCD Mallorca for two years and backing up Dudu Aouate during his spell (13 appearances in all competitions).

Calatayud spent the later part of his career abroad, first with Videoton FC in Hungary then Atlético de Kolkata in the Indian Super League. The 36-year-old moved to local Antequera in the summer of 2016 as they competed in the Tercera División, retiring at the end of the campaign.

== Career statistics ==
Appearances and goals by club, season and competition
Club	Season	League			Cup		Other		Total	
Club	Season	Division	Apps	Goals	Apps	Goals	Apps	Goals	Apps	Goals
Málaga	2003–04	La Liga	18	0	3	0	—		21	0
Málaga	2004–05	La Liga	18	0	1	0	—		19	0
Málaga	Total		36	0	4	0	—		40	0
Getafe (loan)	2005–06	La Liga	13	0	3	0	—		16	0
Racing Santander	2006–07	La Liga	7	0	2	0	—		9	0
Racing Santander	2007–08	La Liga	0	0	0	0	—		0	0
Racing Santander	Total		7	0	2	0	—		9	0
Hércules	2008–09	Segunda División	41	0	0	0	—		41	0
Hércules	2009–10	Segunda División	42	0	0	0	—		42	0
Hércules	2010–11	La Liga	34	0	1	0	—		35	0
Hércules	Total		117	0	1	0	—		118	0
Mallorca	2011–12	La Liga	3	0	6	0	—		9	0
Mallorca	2012–13	La Liga	3	0	1	0	—		4	0
Mallorca	Total		6	0	7	0	—		13	0
Videoton	2013–14	Nemzeti Bajnokság I	30	0	7	0	—		37	0
Videoton	2014–15	Nemzeti Bajnokság I	29	0	6	0	—		35	0
Videoton	Total		59	0	13	0	—		72	0
Atlético Kolkata	2015	Indian Super League	3	0	—		—		3	0
Antequera	2016–17	Tercera División	31	0	—		4	0	35	0
Career total			272	0	30	0	4	0	306	0

== Honours ==
Videoton

- Nemzeti Bajnokság I: 2014–15
- Magyar Kupa runner-up: 2014–15
- Ligakupa runner-up: 2013–14
