= Tibor Heffler =

Hungarian footballer

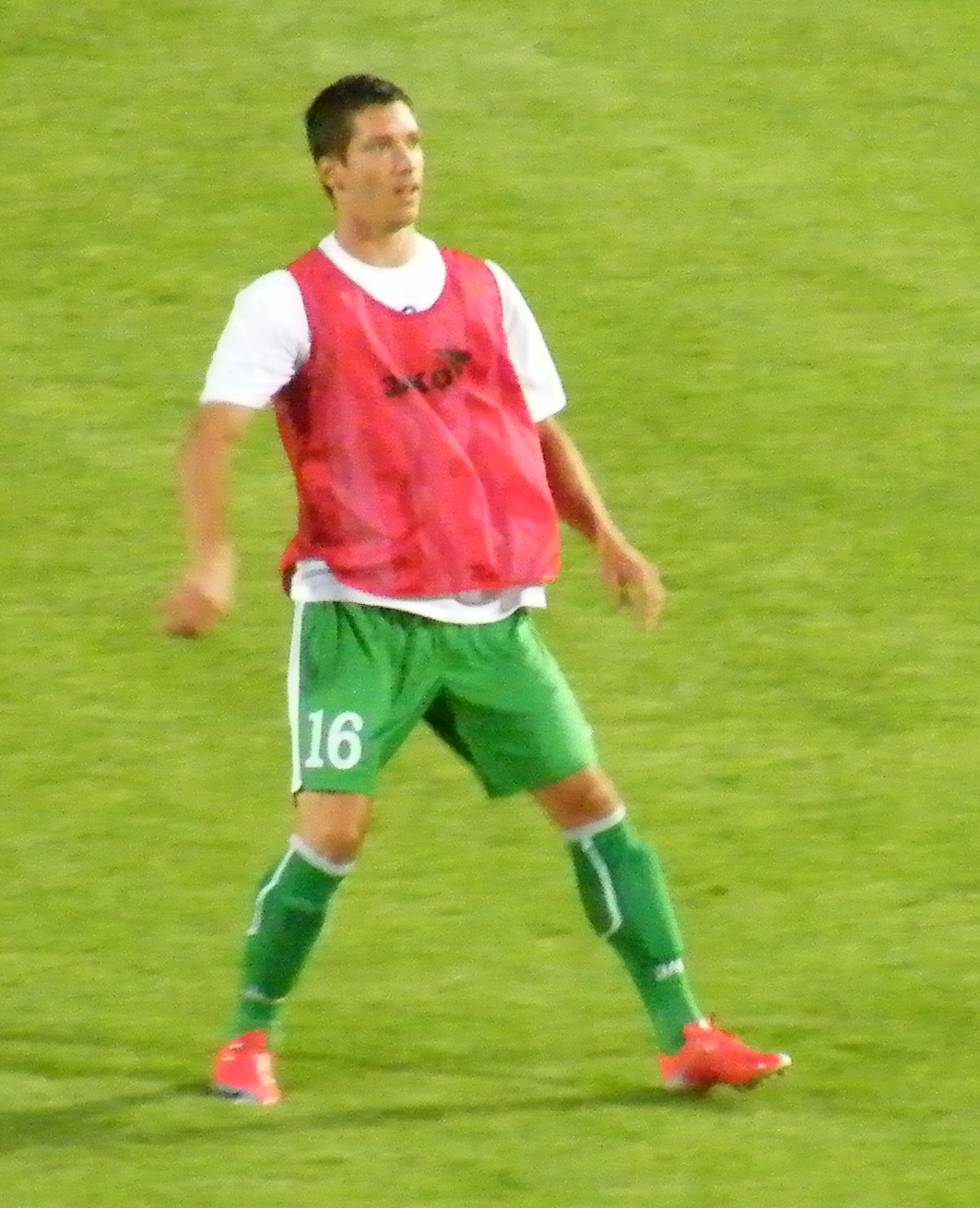

Personal information
- Date of birth: 17 May 1987 (age 39)
- Place of birth: Dunaújváros, Hungary
- Height: 1.80 m (5 ft 11 in)
- Position: Midfielder

Youth career
- 2001–2004: Dunaújváros
- 2004–2005: Paks

Senior career*
| Years | Team | Apps | (Gls) |
| 2005–2014 | Paks | 238 | (17) |
| 2014–2016 | Videoton | 22 | (0) |
| 2016–2017 | Puskás Akadémia | 33 | (2) |
| 2017–2018 | Cegléd | 8 | (0) |
| 2018–2019 | Budapest Honvéd | 45 | (0) |
| 2019–2022 | Ajka | 86 | (0) |

International career^{‡}
| 2003–2004 | Hungary U-17 | 3 | (0) |
| 2005–2006 | Hungary U-19 | 3 | (1) |
| 2007–2009 | Hungary U-21 | 1 | (0) |
| 2014 | Hungary | 2 | (0) |
- * Club domestic league appearances and goals as of 22 May 2022 ‡ National team caps and goals as of 7 June 2014

Tibor Heffler (born 17 May 1987) is a Hungarian football player. He has a brother, Norbert Heffler, who plays for Gyirmót II.

== Honours ==
Paksi SE
Hungarian Second Division: Winner 2006

== Career statistics ==
Appearances and goals by club, season and competition
| Club | Season | League | | | Cup | | League Cup | | Europe | | Total | |
| Club | Season | Division | Apps | Goals | Apps | Goals | Apps | Goals | Apps | Goals | Apps | Goals |
|---|---|---|---|---|---|---|---|---|---|---|---|---|
Paks
| Paks | 2005–06 | Nemzeti Bajnokság II | 21 | 1 | 0 | 0 | 0 | 0 | 0 | 0 | 21 | 1 |
| Paks | 2006–07 | Nemzeti Bajnokság I | 26 | 5 | 1 | 0 | 0 | 0 | 0 | 0 | 27 | 5 |
| Paks | 2007–08 | Nemzeti Bajnokság I | 23 | 4 | 0 | 0 | 13 | 1 | 0 | 0 | 36 | 5 |
| Paks | 2008–09 | Nemzeti Bajnokság I | 30 | 0 | 0 | 0 | 5 | 2 | 0 | 0 | 35 | 2 |
| Paks | 2009–10 | Nemzeti Bajnokság I | 27 | 0 | 2 | 0 | 14 | 3 | 0 | 0 | 43 | 3 |
| Paks | 2010–11 | Nemzeti Bajnokság I | 30 | 2 | 3 | 0 | 6 | 0 | 0 | 0 | 39 | 2 |
| Paks | 2011–12 | Nemzeti Bajnokság I | 30 | 0 | 1 | 0 | 7 | 0 | 5 | 0 | 43 | 0 |
| Paks | 2012–13 | Nemzeti Bajnokság I | 29 | 0 | 3 | 0 | 3 | 0 | 0 | 0 | 35 | 0 |
| Paks | 2013–14 | Nemzeti Bajnokság I | 17 | 3 | 1 | 0 | 6 | 1 | 0 | 0 | 24 | 4 |
| Paks | 2014–15 | Nemzeti Bajnokság I | 5 | 2 | 0 | 0 | 0 | 0 | 0 | 0 | 5 | 2 |
| Paks | Total | | 238 | 17 | 11 | 0 | 54 | 7 | 5 | 0 | 308 | 24 |
Videoton
| Videoton | 2014–15 | Nemzeti Bajnokság I | 12 | 0 | 7 | 0 | 8 | 1 | 0 | 0 | 27 | 1 |
| Videoton | 2015–16 | Nemzeti Bajnokság I | 10 | 0 | 3 | 0 | — | | 0 | 0 | 13 | 0 |
| Videoton | Total | | 22 | 0 | 10 | 0 | 8 | 1 | 0 | 0 | 40 | 1 |
| Puskás Akadémia | 2016–17 | Nemzeti Bajnokság II | 33 | 2 | 2 | 0 | — | | 0 | 0 | 35 | 2 |
| Cegléd | 2017–18 | Nemzeti Bajnokság II | 8 | 0 | 0 | 0 | — | | — | | 8 | 0 |
Budapest Honvéd
| Budapest Honvéd | 2017–18 | Nemzeti Bajnokság I | 14 | 0 | 4 | 0 | — | | 0 | 0 | 18 | 0 |
| Budapest Honvéd | 2018–19 | Nemzeti Bajnokság I | 31 | 0 | 5 | 0 | — | | 3 | 0 | 39 | 0 |
| Budapest Honvéd | 2019–20 | Nemzeti Bajnokság I | 0 | 0 | 0 | 0 | — | | 1 | 0 | 1 | 0 |
| Budapest Honvéd | Total | | 45 | 0 | 9 | 0 | 0 | 0 | 4 | 0 | 58 | 0 |
Ajka
| Ajka | 2019–20 | Nemzeti Bajnokság II | 18 | 0 | 2 | 0 | — | | — | | 20 | 0 |
| Ajka | 2020–21 | Nemzeti Bajnokság II | 3 | 0 | 0 | 0 | — | | — | | 3 | 0 |
| Ajka | Total | | 21 | 0 | 2 | 0 | 0 | 0 | 0 | 0 | 23 | 0 |
| Career total | | | 367 | 19 | 34 | 0 | 62 | 8 | 9 | 0 | 472 | 27 |

Updated to games played as of 9 August 2020.
