= Paulo Vinícius (footballer, born 1990) =

Brazilian-born Hungarian footballer

- Vinícius playing for BVSC-Zugló in 2026

Personal information
- Full name: Paulo Vinícius Souza dos Santos
- Date of birth: 21 February 1990 (age 36)
- Place of birth: São Paulo, Brazil
- Height: 1.84 m (6 ft 0 in)
- Position: Centre back

Team information
- Current team: BVSC-Zugló
- Number: 90

Youth career
- 2008–2009: São Paulo

Senior career*
Years	Team	Apps	(Gls)
2009–2011	River Plate	25	(1)
2011–2020	Fehérvár	199	(10)
2020–2021	Nacional	9	(0)
2021–2022	APOEL	23	(2)
2022–2023	Levadiakos	22	(1)
2023–	BVSC-Zugló	78	(3)

International career^{‡}
2017–2019	Hungary	7	(0)
- * Club domestic league appearances and goals as of 31 May 2026 ‡ National team caps and goals as of 8 November 2018

Paulo Vinícius Souza dos Santos (born 21 February 1990) is a professional footballer who plays as a centre back for NB II club BVSC-Zugló and the Hungary national team. He was born in Brazil, and became a Hungarian citizen on 10 March 2017 and thus eligible to play internationally for Hungary.

== International career ==
Vinícius was called up to the Hungary national football team, after gaining his Hungarian citizenship in 2017.

== Club statistics ==
As of 27 June 2020

Appearances and goals by club, season and competition
Club	Season	League			Cup		League Cup		Europe		Total	
Club	Season	Division	Apps	Goals	Apps	Goals	Apps	Goals	Apps	Goals	Apps	Goals
River Plate	2009–10	Uruguayan Primera División	1	0	0	0	0	0	0	0	1	0
River Plate	2010–11	Uruguayan Primera División	24	1	0	0	0	0	1	0	25	1
River Plate	Total		25	1	0	0	0	0	1	0	26	1
Videoton	2011–12	Nemzeti Bajnokság I	21	3	6	0	8	0	–	–	35	3
Videoton	2012–13	Nemzeti Bajnokság I	20	0	5	1	5	0	12	1	42	2
Videoton	2013–14	Nemzeti Bajnokság I	25	2	3	0	10	0	2	1	40	3
Videoton	2014–15	Nemzeti Bajnokság I	25	2	6	0	6	0	–	–	37	2
Videoton	2015–16	Nemzeti Bajnokság I	27	0	3	1	–	–	6	1	36	2
Videoton	2016–17	Nemzeti Bajnokság I	32	2	3	0	–	–	6	0	41	2
Videoton	2017–18	Nemzeti Bajnokság I	15	1	0	0	–	–	3	0	18	1
Videoton	2018–19	Nemzeti Bajnokság I	24	0	9	1	–	–	14	0	47	1
Videoton	2019–20	Nemzeti Bajnokság I	10	0	2	0	–	–	0	0	12	0
Videoton	Total		199	10	37	3	29	0	43	3	308	16
Career total			224	11	37	3	29	0	44	3	334	17
