= ING Cup (football) =

ING Cup was a pre-Olympics football tournament held at Hong Kong Stadium, Hong Kong from 30 July to 2 August 2008. The Netherlands, Cameroon, United States and Ivory Coast competed for the ING Cup as part of their teams' final preparation for the 2008 Beijing Olympic Games.

== Background ==
The ING Cup was hosted by the Hong Kong Football Association and organised by the Asian Football Confederation's (AFC) marketing partner World Sport Group (WSG).

== Format ==
Since the Netherlands and the United States were in the same group in the Olympic football tournament, they did not face each other in the ING Cup. Therefore, the winner of the ING Cup was determined by the number of points gained from the matches played.

The point system was different from the regular football scoring system. A win earned 3 points, but a point was awarded for every goal scored. A draw still earned one point, and a loss did not gain or lose points.

=== Match Day 1 ===
30 July 2008
18:30 HKT
10:30 UTC

Ivory Coast	0 – 0	United States
	(Report)

Hong Kong Stadium, Hong Kong
Attendance: 6,039

30 July 2008
20:45 HKT
12:45 UTC

Netherlands	2 – 0	Cameroon
Ryan Babel 87'; Roy Makaay 90'	(Report)

Hong Kong Stadium, Hong Kong
Attendance: 6,039

=== Match Day 2 ===
2 August 2008
17:00 HKT
09:00 UTC

Cameroon	1 – 0	United States
Aurélien Chedjou 24' (pen.)	(Report)

Hong Kong Stadium, Hong Kong
Attendance: 6,728

2 August 2008
19:30 HKT
11:30 UTC

Netherlands	1 – 1	Ivory Coast
Urby Emanuelson 14'	(Report)	Gervinho 47'

Hong Kong Stadium, Hong Kong
Attendance: 6,728

== Points table ==
Team	Pld	W	D	L	GF	GA	GD	Pts
Netherlands	2	1	1	0	3	1	+2	7
Cameroon	2	1	0	1	1	2	-1	4
Ivory Coast	2	0	2	0	1	1	0	3
United States	2	0	1	1	0	1	0	1

== Goalscorers ==
The goal scorers from the ING Cup are as follows:

#	Name	Goals
1	(Netherlands) Ryan Babel	1
1	(Netherlands) Roy Makaay	1
1	(Netherlands) Urby Emanuelson	1
1	(Cameroon) Aurélien Chedjou	1
1	(Ivory Coast) Gervinho	1

== Live Broadcast ==
TV Broadcast: TVB Pearl
