= 2011–12 Videoton FC season =

Videoton FC
2011–12 season
- Chairman: (Hungary) István Garancsi
- Manager: (Portugal) Paulo Sousa
- NB 1: Runners-up
- UEFA Champions League: Second qualifying round
- Hungarian Cup: Semi-final
- Hungarian League Cup: Winner
- Hungarian Super Cup: Winner
- Top goalscorer: League: (Serbia) (Hungary) Nemanja Nikolić (19); All: (Serbia) (Hungary) Nemanja Nikolić (30)
- Highest home attendance: 9,500 v FTC (29 April 2012)
- Lowest home attendance: 300 v MTK (16 November 2011)
Home colours	Away colours	Third colours

The 2011–12 season was Videoton FC's 43rd competitive season, 12th consecutive season in the OTP Bank Liga and 70th year in existence as a football club.

== First team squad ==
Note: Flags indicate national team as defined under FIFA eligibility rules; some limited exceptions apply. Players may hold more than one non-FIFA nationality.

No.	Pos.	Nation	Player
2	DF	ESP	Álvaro Brachi
3	DF	BRA	Paulo Vinícius
4	DF	POR	Marco Caneira
7	DF	BRA	Jeff Silva
8	MF	HUN	Attila Polonkai
9	FW	POR	Evandro Brandão
10	FW	HUN	András Gosztonyi
11	MF	HUN	György Sándor
12	GK	SVK	Tomáš Tujvel
14	MF	SRB	Nikola Mitrović
16	MF	POR	Filipe Oliveira (on loan from Parma)
17	FW	SRB	Nemanja Nikolić

No.	Pos.	Nation	Player
18	FW	SRB	Milan Perić
23	DF	HUN	Tamás Vaskó
24	DF	ESP	Héctor Sánchez
26	MF	HUN	Balázs Tóth
27	GK	MNE	Mladen Božović
28	FW	HUN	Sándor Torghelle
29	MF	ESP	Walter Fernández
30	DF	HUN	Roland Szolnoki
70	MF	HUN	István Kovács
77	FW	HUN	Ádám Gyurcsó
99	MF	SRB	Uroš Nikolić

== Transfers ==
=== Summer ===
In: Note: Flags indicate national team as defined under FIFA eligibility rules; some limited exceptions apply. Players may hold more than one non-FIFA nationality.

No.	Pos.	Nation	Player
1	GK	SRB	Filip Pajović (from (Serbia) FK Vojvodina)
2	DF	ESP	Álvaro Brachi (from (Spain) RCD Espanyol B)
3	DF	BRA	Paulo Vinícius (from (Uruguay) River Plate)
4	DF	POR	Marco Caneira (from (Portugal) Sporting CP)
5	DF	GRE	Vassilios Apostolopoulos (from (Greece) Atromitos F.C.)
9	FW	POR	Evandro Brandão (loan from (Portugal) S.L. Benfica)
9	FW	HUN	Illés Sitku (loan return from Újpest FC)
14	MF	SRB	Nikola Mitrovic (from Újpest FC)
16	MF	POR	Filipe Oliveira (loan from (Italy) Parma F.C.)
16	DF	HUN	Ádám Présinger (loan return from Vasas SC)
18	FW	MNE	Goran Vujovic (loan return from Kecskeméti TE)
24	DF	ESP	Héctor Sánchez (from (Spain) Villarreal CF B)
24	MF	HUN	Csaba Ponczók (loan return from Vasas SC)
26	MF	HUN	Balázs Tóth (from (Belgium) K.R.C. Genk)
29	MF	ESP	Walter Fernández (from (Spain) Gimnàstic de Tarragona)
33	DF	HUN	Gábor Horváth (loan return from (Netherlands) NAC Breda)

Out: Note: Flags indicate national team as defined under FIFA eligibility rules; some limited exceptions apply. Players may hold more than one non-FIFA nationality.

No.	Pos.	Nation	Player
1	GK	HUN	Zsolt Sebők (to (Cyprus) AEP Paphos F.C.)
2	DF	SRB	Marko Andić (to (Cyprus) Anorthosis Famagusta)
4	DF	HUN	Sándor Hidvégi (to Zalaegerszegi TE)
5	DF	HUN	Zoltán Lipták (to Újpest FC)
7	MF	SWE	Bojan Djordjic (to (England) Blackpool F.C.)
7	MF	HUN	Dénes Szakály (loan to Zalaegerszegi TE)
9	FW	HUN	Illés Sitku (to FC Tatabánya)
14	MF	HUN	Balázs Farkas (to Vasas SC)
16	DF	HUN	Ádám Présinger (to Lombard-Pápa TFC)
18	MF	HUN	Ádám Gyurcsó (loan to Kecskeméti TE)
18	FW	MNE	Goran Vujovic (loan to Szombathelyi Haladás)
19	FW	HUN	László Lencse (loan to Kecskeméti TE)
20	DF	HUN	Pál Lázár (to (Turkey) Samsunspor)
24	MF	HUN	András Fejes (loan to BFC Siófok)
24	MF	HUN	Csaba Ponczók (unattached)
26	MF	CRO	Damir Milanović (to FC Tatabánya)
28	DF	HUN	Martin Izing (loan to FC Tatabánya)
33	DF	HUN	Gábor Horváth (to (Netherlands) ADO Den Haag)

=== Winter ===
In: Note: Flags indicate national team as defined under FIFA eligibility rules; some limited exceptions apply. Players may hold more than one non-FIFA nationality.

No.	Pos.	Nation	Player
7	DF	BRA	Jeff Silva (from (Brazil) Clube Náutico Capibaribe)
18	FW	SRB	Milan Perić (from Kaposvári Rákóczi FC)
28	FW	HUN	Sándor Torghelle (from Budapest Honvéd FC)
70	MF	HUN	István Kovács (from Szombathelyi Haladás)
77	MF	HUN	Ádám Gyurcsó (loan return from Kecskeméti TE)
99	MF	SRB	Uros Nikolić (from (Serbia) FK Partizan)
—	FW	HUN	Zsolt Haraszti (from Paksi SE)

Out: Note: Flags indicate national team as defined under FIFA eligibility rules; some limited exceptions apply. Players may hold more than one non-FIFA nationality.

No.	Pos.	Nation	Player
6	MF	SRB	Dušan Vasiljević (to Újpest FC)
13	GK	HUN	Bence Somodi (on loan to Gyirmót SE)
21	FW	BRA	Andre Alves (to (Cyprus) AC Omonia)
22	MF	HUN	Dániel Nagy (on loan to Szombathelyi Haladás)
25	MF	HUN	Ákos Elek (on loan to (Turkey) Eskişehirspor)
—	FW	HUN	Zsolt Haraszti (on loan to BFC Siófok)

- List of Hungarian football transfer summer 2011
- List of Hungarian football transfers winter 2011–12

== Statistics ==
=== Appearances and goals ===
Last updated on 27 May 2012.

No.	Pos	Nat	Player	Total		OTP Bank Liga		Champions League		Hungarian Cup		League Cup	
No.	Pos	Nat	Player	Apps	Goals	Apps	Goals	Apps	Goals	Apps	Goals	Apps	Goals
2	DF	(Spain) ESP	Álvaro Brachi	35	1	20	1	2	0	7	0	6	0
3	DF	(Brazil) BRA	Paulo Vinícius	35	3	21	3	0	0	6	0	8	0
4	DF	(Portugal) POR	Marco Caneira	32	0	21	0	0	0	5	0	6	0
7	DF	(Brazil) BRA	Jeff Silva	4	0	1	0	0	0	0	0	3	0
8	MF	(Hungary) HUN	Attila Polonkai	15	0	5	0	2	0	1	0	7	0
9	FW	(Portugal) POR	Evandro Brandão	25	2	14	1	0	0	4	0	7	1
10	FW	(Hungary) HUN	András Gosztonyi	24	1	17	1	2	0	2	0	3	0
11	MF	(Hungary) HUN	György Sándor	40	11	28	7	2	1	6	2	4	1
12	GK	(Slovakia) SVK	Tomáš Tujvel	29	-18	17	-12	2	-4	1	0	9	-2
14	MF	(Serbia) SRB	Nikola Mitrović	45	2	28	1	2	0	6	0	9	1
16	MF	(Portugal) POR	Filipe Oliveira	34	3	23	2	0	0	3	1	8	0
17	FW	(Hungary) HUN	Nemanja Nikolić	47	30	30	19	1	0	6	4	10	7
18	FW	(Serbia) SRB	Milan Perić	8	5	4	2	0	0	1	1	3	2
23	DF	(Hungary) HUN	Tamás Vaskó	27	2	16	1	0	0	3	0	8	1
24	DF	(Spain) ESP	Héctor Sánchez	28	0	14	0	2	0	4	0	8	0
26	MF	(Hungary) HUN	Balázs Tóth	33	0	20	0	0	0	7	0	6	0
27	GK	(Montenegro) MNE	Mladen Božović	20	-14	13	-7	0	0	6	-5	1	-2
28	FW	(Hungary) HUN	Sándor Torghelle	15	5	9	1	0	0	3	2	3	2
29	MF	(Spain) ESP	Walter Fernández	36	3	22	1	2	0	5	1	7	1
30	MF	(Hungary) HUN	Roland Szolnoki	24	0	13	0	0	0	4	0	7	0
70	MF	(Hungary) HUN	István Kovács	18	0	10	0	0	0	4	0	4	0
77	FW	(Hungary) HUN	Ádám Gyurcsó	22	3	13	2	0	0	4	0	5	1
99	MF	(Serbia) SRB	Uros Nikolić	4	0	1	0	0	0	0	0	3	0
Youth players:
1	GK	(Serbia) SRB	Filip Pajović	2	-1	0	0	0	0	0	0	2	-1
5	DF	(Greece) GRE	Vassilios Apostolopoulos	8	0	0	0	0	0	2	0	6	0
20	MF	(Hungary) HUN	Patrik Paudits	1	0	0	0	0	0	0	0	1	0
31	MF	(Hungary) HUN	Andor Margitics	6	0	0	0	0	0	1	0	5	0
32	MF	(Hungary) HUN	Patrik Király	3	0	0	0	0	0	0	0	3	0
33	FW	(Hungary) HUN	János Máté	2	0	0	0	0	0	0	0	2	0
––	FW	(Hungary) HUN	Barnabás Babos	1	0	0	0	0	0	0	0	1	0
Players currently out on loan
7	MF	(Hungary) HUN	Dénes Szakály	2	0	1	0	0	0	0	0	1	0
13	GK	(Hungary) HUN	Bence Somodi	1	-2	0	0	0	0	0	0	1	-2
22	MF	(Hungary) HUN	Dániel Nagy	14	1	5	0	2	0	1	0	6	1
25	MF	(Hungary) HUN	Ákos Elek	16	2	13	1	2	1	1	0	0	0
Players no longer at the club:
5	DF	(Hungary) HUN	Zoltán Lipták	6	1	4	0	2	1	0	0	0	0
6	MF	(Serbia) SRB	Dušan Vasiljević	23	5	13	2	1	0	3	1	6	2
21	FW	(Brazil) BRA	Andre Alves	25	14	17	12	2	0	2	0	4	2
33	DF	(Hungary) HUN	Gábor Horváth	9	0	7	0	2	0	0	0	0	0

=== Top scorers ===
Includes all competitive matches. The list is sorted by shirt number when total goals are equal.

Last updated on 27 May 2012

Position	Nation	Number	Name	OTP Bank Liga	Champions League	Hungarian Cup	League Cup	Total
1	(Serbia) (Hungary)	17	Nemanja Nikolić	19	0	4	7	30
2	(Brazil)	21	Andre Alves	12	0	0	2	14
3	(Hungary)	11	György Sándor	7	1	2	1	11
4	(Serbia)	6	Dušan Vasiljević	2	0	1	2	5
5	(Serbia)	18	Milan Perić	2	0	1	2	5
6	(Hungary)	28	Sándor Torghelle	1	0	2	2	5
7	(Brazil)	3	Paulo Vinícius	3	0	0	0	3
8	(Portugal)	16	Filipe Oliveira	2	0	1	0	3
9	(Hungary)	77	Ádám Gyurcsó	2	0	0	1	3
10	(Spain)	29	Walter Fernández	1	0	1	1	3
11	(Hungary)	25	Ákos Elek	1	1	0	0	2
12	(Portugal)	9	Evandro Brandão	1	0	0	1	2
13	(Hungary)	23	Tamás Vaskó	1	0	0	1	2
14	(Serbia)	14	Nikola Mitrović	1	0	0	1	2
15	(Hungary)	5	Zoltán Lipták	0	1	0	0	1
16	(Spain)	2	Álvaro Brachi	1	0	0	0	1
17	(Hungary)	10	András Gosztonyi	1	0	0	0	1
18	(Hungary)	22	Dániel Nagy	0	0	0	1	1
/	/	/	Own Goals	1	0	0	0	1
			TOTALS	58	3	12	22	95

=== Disciplinary record ===
Includes all competitive matches. Players with 1 card or more included only.

Last updated on 27 May 2012

Position	Nation	Number	Name	OTP Bank Liga		Champions League		Hungarian Cup		League Cup		Total (Hu Total)	
Position	Nation	Number	Name	Booked	Sent off (straight red)	Booked	Sent off (straight red)	Booked	Sent off (straight red)	Booked	Sent off (straight red)	Booked	Sent off (straight red)
DF	(Spain)	2	Álvaro Brachi	6	1	1	0	2	0	0	0	9 (6)	1 (1)
DF	(Brazil)	3	Paulo Vinícius	4	0	0	0	1	0	2	0	7 (4)	0 (0)
DF	(Portugal)	4	Marco Caneira	6	1	0	0	2	0	2	0	10 (6)	1 (1)
DF	(Hungary)	5	Zoltán Lipták	2	0	2	0	0	0	0	0	4 (2)	0 (0)
DF	(Greece)	5	Vassilios Apostolopoulos	0	0	0	0	1	0	1	0	2 (0)	0 (0)
MF	(Serbia)	6	Dušan Vasiljević	0	0	0	0	2	0	1	0	3 (0)	0 (0)
FW	(Portugal)	9	Evandro Brandão	2	0	0	0	0	0	0	1	2 (2)	1 (0)
FW	(Hungary)	10	András Gosztonyi	1	0	0	0	0	0	1	0	2 (1)	0 (0)
MF	(Hungary)	11	György Sándor	1	0	0	0	1	0	0	0	2 (1)	0 (0)
GK	(Slovakia)	12	Tomáš Tujvel	0	0	0	0	1	0	0	1	1 (0)	1 (0)
MF	(Serbia)	14	Nikola Mitrović	5	0	0	0	0	0	2	0	7 (5)	0 (0)
MF	(Portugal)	16	Filipe Oliveira	5	0	0	0	1	0	1	0	7 (5)	0 (0)
FW	(Serbia) (Hungary)	17	Nemanja Nikolić	3	0	0	0	0	0	2	0	5 (3)	0 (0)
FW	(Serbia)	18	Milan Perić	0	0	0	0	1	0	0	0	1 (0)	0 (0)
FW	(Brazil)	21	Andre Alves	2	0	1	0	0	0	0	0	3 (2)	0 (0)
DF	(Hungary)	23	Tamás Vaskó	5	1	0	0	0	0	1	0	6 (5)	1 (1)
DF	(Spain)	24	Héctor Sánchez	2	1	0	0	0	0	0	0	2 (2)	1 (1)
MF	(Hungary)	25	Ákos Elek	2	0	1	0	0	0	0	0	3 (2)	0 (0)
MF	(Hungary)	26	Balázs Tóth	2	0	0	0	0	0	1	0	3 (2)	0 (0)
GK	(Montenegro)	27	Mladen Božović	2	0	0	0	0	0	0	0	2 (2)	0 (0)
FW	(Hungary)	28	Sándor Torghelle	2	0	0	0	1	0	1	0	4 (2)	0 (0)
MF	(Spain)	29	Walter Fernández	1	0	0	0	0	1	0	0	1 (1)	1 (0)
DF	(Hungary)	30	Roland Szolnoki	4	0	0	0	2	0	0	0	6 (4)	0 (0)
DF	(Hungary)	33	Gábor Horváth	0	0	1	0	0	0	0	0	1 (0)	0 (0)
FW	(Hungary)	77	Ádám Gyurcsó	1	0	0	0	0	0	0	0	1 (1)	0 (0)
MF	(Serbia)	99	Uros Nikolić	1	0	0	0	0	0	0	0	1 (1)	0 (0)
MF	(Hungary)	––	Andor Margitics	0	0	0	0	0	0	1	0	1 (0)	0 (0)
			TOTALS	59	4	6	0	15	1	16	2	96 (59)	7 (4)

=== Overall ===
Games played	50 (30 OTP Bank Liga, 2 UEFA Champions League, 7 Hungarian Cup and 11 Hungarian League Cup)
Games won	35 (21 OTP Bank Liga, 1 UEFA Champions League, 5 Hungarian Cup and 8 Hungarian League Cup)
Games drawn	6 (3 OTP Bank Liga, 0 UEFA Champions League, 1 Hungarian Cup and 2 Hungarian League Cup)
Games lost	9 (6 OTP Bank Liga, 1 UEFA Champions League, 1 Hungarian Cup and 1 Hungarian League Cup)
Goals scored	95
Goals conceded	35
Goal difference	+60
Yellow cards	96
Red cards	7
Worst discipline	(Portugal) Marco Caneira (10 (yellow card) , 1 (red card) )
Best result	7–0 (H) v BFC Siófok - OTP Bank Liga - 19-11-2011
Worst result	0–2 (A) v SK Sturm Graz - UEFA Champions League - 13-07-2011
Worst result	0–2 (A) v Kaposvári Rákóczi FC - OTP Bank Liga - 30-07-2011
Worst result	0–2 (H) v Kecskeméti TE - OTP Bank Liga - 16-10-2011
Worst result	0–2 (H) v MTK Budapest FC - Magyar Kupa - 10-14-2012
Most appearances	(Serbia) (Hungary) Nemanja Nikolić (47 appearances)
Top scorer	(Serbia) (Hungary) Nemanja Nikolić (30 goals)
Points	111/150 (74.0%)

Last updated: 27 May 2012

== Nemzeti Bajnokság I ==
=== Matches ===
17 August 2011 1	BFC Siófok	0–0	Videoton FC	Siófok, Somogy County
19:00 CET (UTC+01)		(Report)		Stadium: Révész Street Stadium; Attendance: 4,500; Referee: (Hungary) Ádám Farkas

24 July 2011 2	Videoton FC	4–0	Paksi SE	Székesfehérvár, Fejér County
16:00 CET (UTC+01)	Vasiljević 4' 68'; Alves 38'; Nikolić 87'	(Report)		Stadium: Stadion Sóstói; Attendance: 3,000; Referee: (Hungary) József Berger

30 July 2011 3	Kaposvári Rákóczi FC	2–0	Videoton FC	Kaposvár, Somogy County
20:00 CET (UTC+01)	Perić 13' 68'	(Report)		Stadium: Stadion Kaposvár Rákóczi; Attendance: 3,000; Referee: (Hungary) Ádám Németh

6 August 2011 4	Videoton FC	2–0	Diósgyőri VTK	Székesfehérvár, Fejér County
20:00 CET (UTC+01)	Alves 21'; Brachi 89'	(Report)		Stadium: Stadion Sóstói; Attendance: 4,085; Referee: (Hungary) Péter Solymosi

14 August 2011 5	Debreceni VSC	2–1	Videoton FC	Debrecen, Hajdú-Bihar County
16:00 CET (UTC+01)	Kulcsár 3'; Ramos 47'	(Report)	Korhut 41' (o.g.)	Stadium: Stadion Oláh Gábor Út; Attendance: 9,000; Referee: (Hungary) Viktor Kassai

20 August 2011 6	Videoton FC	4–1	Pécsi Mecsek FC	Székesfehérvár, Fejér County
17:30 CET (UTC+01)	Alves 17' (pen.); Elek 25'; Brandão 69'; Nikolić 90'	(Report)	Pintér 23'	Stadium: Sóstói Stadion; Attendance: 3,200; Referee: (Hungary) Tamás Bognár

27 August 2011 7	Budapest Honvéd FC	1–0	Videoton FC	Budapest, Pest County
17:30 CET (UTC+01)	Danilo 58' (pen.)	(Report)		Stadium: Bozsik Stadion; Attendance: 1,500; Referee: (Hungary) Viktor Kassai

10 September 2011 8	Videoton FC	1–0	Szombathelyi Haladás	Székesfehérvár, Fejér County
17:30 CET (UTC+01)	Vaskó 90'	(Report)		Stadium: Sóstói Stadion; Attendance: 3,447; Referee: (Hungary) Mihály Fábián

17 September 2011 9	Vasas SC	0–0	Videoton FC	Budapest, Pest County
15:00 CET (UTC+01)		(Report)		Stadium: Stadion Rudolf Illovszky; Attendance: 2,000; Referee: (Hungary) Péter Solymosi

23 September 2011 10	Videoton FC	4–1	Zalaegerszegi TE	Székesfehérvár, Fejér County
18:00 CET (UTC+01)	Fernández 31'; Sándor 51'; Alves 56' 71'	(Report)	Máté 88'	Stadium: Stadion Sóstói; Attendance: 3,262; Referee: (Chile) Alvaro Miquel Garcia

2 October 2011 11	Ferencvárosi TC	0–1	Videoton FC	Budapest, Pest County
18:00 CET (UTC+01)		(Report)	Alves 14'	Stadium: Stadion Albert Flórián; Attendance: 5,000; Referee: (Hungary) Viktor Kassai

15 October 2011 12	Videoton FC	0–2	Kecskeméti TE	Székesfehérvár, Fejér County
17:30 CET (UTC+01)		(Report)	Radanović 56'; Savić 67'	Stadium: Stadion Sóstói; Attendance: 2,788; Referee: (Hungary) István Vad

23 October 2011 13	Győri ETO FC	1–0	Videoton FC	Győr, Győr-Moson-Sopron County
16:00 CET (UTC+01)	Dudás 12'	(Report)		Stadium: ETO Park; Attendance: 5,500; Referee: (Hungary) Sándor Andó-Szabó

29 October 2011 14	Lombard-Pápa TFC	2–3	Videoton FC	Pápa, Veszprém County
15:00 CET (UTC+01)	Marić 59'; Ferenczi 67'	(Report)	Alves 65' 77'; Nikolić 81'	Stadium: Stadion Várkerti; Attendance: 1,500; Referee: (Hungary) Ádám Németh

6 November 2011 15	Videoton FC	3–0	Újpest FC	Székesfehérvár, Fejér County
16:00 CET (UTC+01)	Nikolić 79' 82'; Alves 85'	(Report)		Stadium: Stadion Sóstói; Attendance: 4,150; Referee: (Hungary) Mihály Fábián

19 November 2011 16	Videoton FC	7–0	BFC Siófok	Székesfehérvár, Fejér County
15:00 CET (UTC+01)	Oliveira 41'; Alves 45' 82' 86'; Sándor 61'; Nikolić 80' 88'	(Report)		Stadium: Stadion Sóstói; Attendance: 2,500; Referee: (Hungary) Gábor Oláh

27 November 2011 17	Paksi SE	1–2	Videoton FC	Paks, Tolna County
16:00 CET (UTC+01)	Szatmári 40'	(Report)	Vinícius 66'; Nikolić 83'	Stadium: Stadion PSE; Attendance: 1,500; Referee: (Chile) Alvaro Miquel Garcia

3 March 2012 18	Videoton FC	2–0	Kaposvári Rákóczi FC	Székesfehérvár, Fejér County
15:00 CET (UTC+01)	Nikolić 69'; Gyurcsó 90'	(Report)		Stadium: Sóstói Stadion; Attendance: 3,423; Referee: (Hungary) József Berger

11 March 2012 19	Diósgyőri VTK	0–2	Videoton FC	Miskolc, Borsod-Abaúj-Zemplén County
18:00 CET (UTC+01)		(Report)	Vinícius 3'; Nikolić 73'	Stadium: DVTK Stadion; Attendance: 8,000; Referee: (Hungary) Zsolt Szabó

18 March 2012 20	Videoton FC	0–1	Debreceni VSC	Székesfehérvár, Fejér County
16:00 CET (UTC+01)		(Report)	Coulibaly 63'	Stadium: Sóstói Stadion; Attendance: 8,120; Referee: (Hungary) Zoltán Iványi

24 March 2012 21	Pécsi Mecsek FC	1–3	Videoton FC	Pécs, Baranya County
17:00 CET (UTC+01)	Andorka 53'	(Report)	Nikolić 13' 69' (pen.); Gyurcsó 40'	Stadium: Stadion PMFC; Attendance: 3,500; Referee: (Hungary) Tamás Bognár

1 April 2012 22	Videoton FC	1–0	Budapest Honvéd FC	Székesfehérvár, Fejér County
18:00 CET (UTC+01)	Torghelle 90+2'	(Report)		Stadium: Sóstói Stadion; Attendance: 4,138; Referee: (Hungary) János Takács

7 April 2012 23	Szombathelyi Haladás	2–2	Videoton FC	Szombathely, Vas County
18:00 CET (UTC+01)	Radó 65'; Halmosi 79'	(Report)	Oliveira 40'; Sándor 59' (pen.)	Stadium: Rohonci Street Stadium; Attendance: 5,000; Referee: (Hungary) Ádám Németh

15 April 2012 24	Videoton FC	4–1	Vasas SC	Székesfehérvár, Fejér County
16:00 CET (UTC+01)	Vinícius 8'; Sándor 47'; Nikolić 54' 71'	(Report)	Ferkó 5'	Stadium: Sóstói Stadion; Attendance: 2,800; Referee: (Hungary) József Berger

21 April 2012 25	Zalaegerszegi TE	0–2	Videoton FC	Zalaegerszeg, Zala County
15:00 CET (UTC+01)		(Report)	Nikolić 41' (pen.); Gosztonyi 73'	Stadium: ZTE Arena; Attendance: 4,000; Referee: (Hungary) Gábor Oláh

29 April 2012 26	Videoton FC	2–0	Ferencvárosi TC	Székesfehérvár, Fejér County
16:00 CET (UTC+01)	Nikolić 67'; Mitrović 78' (pen.)	(Report)		Stadium: Sóstói Stadion; Attendance: 9,500; Referee: (Hungary) Mihály Fábián

5 May 2012 27	Kecskeméti TE	0–2	Videoton FC	Kecskemét, Bács-Kiskun County
15:00 CET (UTC+01)		(Report)	Sándor 10' 71'	Stadium: Széktói Stadion; Attendance: 2,500; Referee: (Hungary) Zsolt Szabó

13 May 2012 28	Videoton FC	2–1	Győri ETO FC	Székesfehérvár, Fejér County
16:45 CET (UTC+01)	Nikolić 47'; Sándor 90'	(Report)	Koltai 49'	Stadium: Sóstói Stadion; Attendance: 4,000; Referee: (Hungary) Sándor Andó-Szabó

20 May 2012 29	Videoton FC	2–0	Lombard-Pápa TFC	Székesfehérvár, Fejér County
18:00 CET (UTC+01)	Nikolić 52' (pen.) 69'	(Report)		Stadium: Sóstói Stadion; Attendance: 3,412; Referee: (Hungary) Ádám Radványi

27 May 2012 30	Újpest FC	0–2	Videoton FC	Budapest, Pest County
15:30 CET (UTC+01)		(Report)	Perić 88' 89'	Stadium: Szusza Ferenc Stadium; Attendance: 2,837; Referee: (Hungary) Tamás Bognár

=== Classification ===
Pos	Team	Pld	W	D	L	GF	GA	GD	Pts	Qualification or relegation
1	Debrecen (C)	30	22	8	0	64	18	+46	74	Qualification for Champions League second qualifying round
2	Videoton	30	21	3	6	58	19	+39	66	Qualification for Europa League second qualifying round (Note: Since Debrecen won both the league and the 2011–12 Hungarian Cup competition, the second qualifying round berth transferred to the second-placed team of the league, and cup runners-up MTK (playing in the 2011–12 Nemzeti Bajnokság II) inherited the respective spot in the first qualifying round.)
3	Győr	30	20	3	7	56	31	+25	63	Ineligible for 2012–13 European competitions (Note: Győr have been suspended from participating in UEFA competitions for the first season they qualify between the 2011–12 and 2013–14 seasons in relation to club licensing violations. As a consequence, since they finish in any of the top three positions, the respective qualifying spots have been allocated to the team(s) immediately below.)
4	Honvéd	30	13	7	10	48	40	+8	46	Qualification for Europa League first qualifying round
5	Kecskemét	30	13	6	11	48	38	+10	45	

Source: MLSZ (in Hungarian)
Rules for classification: 1st points; 2nd overall wins; 3rd goal difference; 4th goals scored
(C) Champions

=== Results summary ===
Overall								Home						Away					
Pld	W	D	L	GF	GA	GD	Pts	W	D	L	GF	GA	GD	W	D	L	GF	GA	GD
30	21	3	6	58	19	+39	66	13	0	2	38	7	+31	8	3	4	20	12	+8

Last updated: 27 May 2012.
Source: NB1

=== Results by round ===
Round	1	2	3	4	5	6	7	8	9	10	11	12	13	14	15	16	17	18	19	20	21	22	23	24	25	26	27	28	29	30
Ground	A	H	A	H	A	H	A	H	A	H	A	H	A	A	H	H	A	H	A	H	A	H	A	H	A	H	A	H	H	A
Result	D	W	L	W	L	W	L	W	D	W	W	L	L	W	W	W	W	W	W	L	W	W	D	W	W	W	W	W	W	W
Position	9	5	8	6	8	5	7	5	6	6	3	5	6	5	4	3	3	2	2	2	2	2	2	2	2	2	2	2	2	2

Updated to match(es) played on 27 May 2012. Source: Matches
A = Away; H = Home; W = Win; D = Draw; L = Loss

== Hungarian Cup ==
26 October 2011 4	FC Tatabánya	0–2	Videoton FC	Tatabánya, Komárom-Esztergom
14:00		(Report)	Nikolić 16'; Sándor 71'	Stadium: Stadion Gyula Grosics; Attendance: 400; Referee: (Hungary) Ádám Farkas

=== Round of 16 ===
30 November 2011 1st leg	Videoton FC	1–0	Szombathelyi Haladás	Székesfehérvár, Fejér County
18:00	Vasiljević 22' (pen.)	(Report)		Stadium: Sóstói Stadion; Attendance: 923; Referee: (Hungary) József Berger

3 December 2011 2nd leg	Szombathelyi Haladás	0–0 (0–1 agg.)	Videoton FC	Szombathely, Vas County
15:00		(Report)		Stadium: Rohonci Street Stadium; Attendance: 2,000; Referee: (Hungary) Zsolt Szabó

=== Quarter-final ===
25 February 2012 1st leg	Videoton FC	5–1	Győri ETO FC	Székesfehérvár, Fejér County
16:00	Fernández 14'; Nikolić 39' (pen.); Sándor 48' (pen.); Oliveira 67'; Torghelle 90+2'	(Report)	Windecker 80'	Stadium: Sóstói Stadion; Attendance: 3,000; Referee: (Hungary) Péter Solymosi

14 March 2012 2nd leg	Győri ETO FC	0–1 (1–6 agg.)	Videoton FC	Győr, Győr-Moson-Sopron County
18:00		(Report)	Perić 11'	Stadium: ETO Park; Attendance: 500; Referee: (Hungary) Gergely Szőts

=== Semi-final ===
21 March 2012 1st leg	MTK Budapest FC	2–3	Videoton FC	Budapest, Pest County
17:00	Könyves 6' 26'	(Report)	Nikolić 52' 85' (pen.); Torghelle 63'	Stadium: Hidegkuti Nándor Stadium; Attendance: 600; Referee: (Hungary) Mihály Fábián

10 April 2012 2nd leg	Videoton FC	0–2 (3–4 agg.)	MTK Budapest FC	Székesfehérvár, Fejér County
18:00		(Report)	Kanta 22'; Tischler 31'	Stadium: Sóstói Stadion; Attendance: 2,000; Referee: (Hungary) Ádám Farkas

== League Cup ==
=== Group stage ===
31 August 2011 1	MTK Budapest FC	1–0	Videoton FC	Budapest, Pest County
17:00	Könyves 72'	(Report)		Stadium: Hidegkuti Nándor Stadium; Attendance: 147; Referee: (Chile) Alvaro Miquel Garcia

7 September 2011 2	Videoton FC	4–2	Gyirmót SE	Székesfehérvár, Fejér County
19:00	Nikolić 16' 90+2'; Alves 46' 82'	(Report)	Sánchez 32' (o.g.); Lannert 73'	Stadium: Sóstói Stadion; Attendance: 1,000; Referee: (Hungary) Tibor Gyarmati

5 October 2011 3	Videoton FC	2–1	Budapest Honvéd FC	Székesfehérvár, Fejér County
19:00	Nagy 70'; Nikolić 90+1'	(Report)	Torghelle 72'	Stadium: Sóstói Stadion; Attendance: 500; Referee: (Hungary) Balázs Böcskei

12 October 2011 4	Budapest Honvéd FC	1–1	Videoton FC	Budapest, Pest County
18:00	Abass 82'	(Report)	Fernández 90+2'	Stadium: Bozsik Stadion; Attendance: 200; Referee: (Hungary) János Takács

9 November 2011 5	Gyirmót SE	2–4	Videoton FC	Győr, Győr-Moson-Sopron County
15:00	Varga 42' (pen.); Homonyik 87' (pen.)	(Report)	Nikolić 21' 54'; Vasiljević 34' 85'	Stadium: Ménfői úti sporttelep Attendance: 200; Referee: (Hungary) Ádám Radványi

16 November 2011 6	Videoton FC	0–0	MTK Budapest FC	Székesfehérvár, Fejér County
16:00		(Report)		Stadium: Sóstói Stadion; Attendance: 300; Referee: (Hungary) Balázs Berke

==== Classification ====
Pos	Team	Pld	W	D	L	GF	GA	GD	Pts	Qualification
1	Videoton	6	3	2	1	11	7	+4	11	Advance to knockout phase
2	MTK Budapest	6	3	2	1	6	5	+1	11	Advance to knockout phase
3	Budapest Honvéd	6	2	1	3	8	8	0	7	
4	Gyirmót	6	1	1	4	9	11	−2	4	

Rules for classification: 1) points; 2) goal difference; 3) number of goals scored.

=== Quarter-final ===
22 February 2012 1st leg	Diósgyőri VTK	0–2	Videoton FC	Miskolc, Borsod-Abaúj-Zemplén County
18:00		(Report)	Torghelle 25'; Nikolić 90+2'	Stadium: DVTK Stadion; Attendance: 4,000; Referee: (Hungary) Zoltán Iványi

7 March 2012 2nd leg	Videoton FC	2–0 (4–0 agg.)	Diósgyőri VTK	Székesfehérvár, Fejér County
16:00	Brandão 31'; Mitrović 51' (pen.)	(Report)		Stadium: Sóstói Stadion; Attendance: 2,000; Referee: (Hungary) Balázs Berke

=== Semi-final ===
27 March 2012 1st leg	Lombard-Pápa TFC	0–3	Videoton FC	Pápa, Veszprém County
18:00		(Report)	Perić 56' 69'; Torghelle 90+1'	Stadium: Stadion Várkerti; Attendance: 500; Referee: (Hungary) István Vad

4 April 2012 2nd leg	Videoton FC	1–0 (4–0 agg.)	Lombard-Pápa TFC	Székesfehérvár, Fejér County
15:30	Vaskó 86'	(Report)		Stadium: Sóstói Stadion; Attendance: 500; Referee: (Hungary) Csaba Pintér

=== Final ===
18 April 2012 Final	Kecskeméti TE	0–3	Videoton FC	Kecskemét, Bács-Kiskun County
17:30		(Report)	Sándor 38'; Gyurcsó 65'; Nikolić 90+1'	Stadium: Széktói Stadion; Attendance: 5,000; Referee: (Hungary) Tamás Bognár

== UEFA Champions League ==
The First and Second Qualifying Round draws took place at UEFA headquarters in Nyon, Switzerland on 20 June 2011.

13 July 2011 Q2 Leg 1	SK Sturm Graz (Austria)	2–0	(Hungary) Videoton FC	Klagenfurt
20:30 CEST	Szabics 68'; Kienast 90+2'	(Report)		Stadium: Hypo-Arena; Attendance: 11,500; Referee: (England) Stuart Attwell

20 July 2011 Q2 Leg 2	Videoton FC (Hungary)	3–2 (3–4 agg.)	(Austria) SK Sturm Graz	Székesfehérvár
20:30 CEST	Elek 27'; Sándor 32'; Lipták 45'	(Report)	Hölzl 30'; Feldhofer 36'	Stadium: Sóstói Stadion; Attendance: 8,780; Referee: (North Macedonia) Aleksandar Stavrev

== Super Cup ==
8 July 2011 final	Kecskeméti TE	0–1	Videoton FC	Kecskemét
19:00 CEST		(Report)	Alves 82'	Stadium: Széktói Stadion; Attendance: 5,000; Referee: (Hungary) Mihály Fábián
