= 2012–13 Videoton FC season =

Videoton FC
2012–13 season
- Chairman: (Hungary) István Garancsi
- Manager: (Portugal) Paulo Sousa (until 7 January 2013) (Portugal) José Gomes
- NB 1: 2.
- UEFA Europa League: Group stage
- Hungarian Cup: Semi-final
- Super Cup: Winner
- Hungarian League Cup: Runners-up
- Top goalscorer: League: Nemanja Nikolić (13); All: Nemanja Nikolić (27)
- Highest home attendance: 11,230 v Trabzonspor (30 July 2012)
- Lowest home attendance: 100 v Zalaegerszeg (16 October 2012)
Home colours	Away colours	Third colours

The 2012–13 season will be Videoton FC's 44th competitive season, 13th consecutive season in the OTP Bank Liga and 71st year in existence as a football club.

== First team squad ==
Note: Flags indicate national team as defined under FIFA eligibility rules; some limited exceptions apply. Players may hold more than one non-FIFA nationality.

No.	Pos.	Nation	Player
2	DF	ESP	Álvaro Brachi
3	DF	BRA	Paulo Vinícius
4	DF	POR	Marco Caneira
5	MF	POR	Vítor Gomes (on loan from Rio Ave)
7	FW	BRA	Paraiba
9	FW	POR	Jucie Lupeta
12	GK	SVK	Tomáš Tujvel
14	MF	SRB	Nikola Mitrović
16	MF	POR	Filipe Oliveira
17	FW	HUN	Nemanja Nikolić
21	DF	HUN	Adrián Szekeres
22	DF	CPV	Stopira

No.	Pos.	Nation	Player
23	MF	SLV	Arturo Alvarez (on loan from Paços de Ferreira)
24	DF	ESP	Héctor Sánchez
26	MF	HUN	Balázs Tóth
27	GK	MNE	Mladen Božović
28	FW	HUN	Sándor Torghelle
30	DF	HUN	Roland Szolnoki
32	DF	HUN	Roland Juhász (on loan from Anderlecht)
70	MF	HUN	István Kovács
77	FW	HUN	Ádám Gyurcsó
88	MF	HUN	Zsolt Haraszti
99	MF	SRB	Uroš Nikolić

== Transfers ==
=== Summer ===
In: Note: Flags indicate national team as defined under FIFA eligibility rules; some limited exceptions apply. Players may hold more than one non-FIFA nationality.

No.	Pos.	Nation	Player
7	FW	BRA	Paraiba (from (Brazil) Londrina)
7	MF	HUN	Dénes Szakály (loan return from Zalaegerszeg)
10	MF	BRA	Renato Neto (loan from (Portugal) Sporting)
13	GK	HUN	Bence Somodi (loan return from Gyirmót)
16	MF	POR	Filipe Oliveira (from (Italy) Parma)
18	FW	MNE	Goran Vujović (loan return from Szombathely)
19	FW	HUN	László Lencse (loan return from Kecskemét)
21	DF	HUN	Adrián Szekeres (from MTK Budapest)
22	DF	CPV	Stopira (from (Portugal) Feirense)
23	DF	BRA	Kaká (from (Cyprus) APOEL Nicosia)
25	MF	HUN	Ákos Elek (loan return from (Turkey) Eskisehirspor)
88	FW	HUN	Zsolt Haraszti (from Paks)

Out: Note: Flags indicate national team as defined under FIFA eligibility rules; some limited exceptions apply. Players may hold more than one non-FIFA nationality.

No.	Pos.	Nation	Player
1	GK	SRB	Filip Pajović (loan to Puskás)
5	DF	GRE	Vassilios Apostolopoulos (loan to Puskás)
7	MF	HUN	Dénes Szakály (loan to Puskás)
7	MF	BRA	Jeff Silva (loan to Diósgyőr)
8	MF	HUN	Attila Polonkai (to Puskás)
8	FW	SRB	Milan Perić (loan to Ferencváros)
9	FW	POR	Evandro Brandão (loan to (Portugal) Olhanense)
10	FW	HUN	András Gosztonyi (to Diósgyőr)
16	MF	POR	Filipe Oliveira (loan return to (Italy) Parma)
18	FW	MNE	Goran Vujović (to Eger)
23	DF	HUN	Tamás Vaskó (to Kecskemét)
25	MF	HUN	Ákos Elek (to Diósgyőr)

=== Winter ===
In: Note: Flags indicate national team as defined under FIFA eligibility rules; some limited exceptions apply. Players may hold more than one non-FIFA nationality.

No.	Pos.	Nation	Player
5	MF	POR	Vítor Gomes (loan from (Portugal) Rio Ave)
7	MF	BRA	Jeff Silva (loan return from Diósgyőr)
13	GK	SRB	Filip Pajović (from Puskás)
20	DF	HUN	Donát Zsótér (from Videoton U-19)
22	MF	HUN	Dániel Nagy (loan return from Szombathely)
23	MF	SLV	Arturo Alvarez (loan from (Portugal) Paços de Ferreira)
32	DF	HUN	Roland Juhász (loan from (Belgium) Anderlecht)

Out: Note: Flags indicate national team as defined under FIFA eligibility rules; some limited exceptions apply. Players may hold more than one non-FIFA nationality.

No.	Pos.	Nation	Player
7	MF	BRA	Jeff Silva (to (Brazil) ABC)
10	MF	BRA	Renato Neto (loan return to (Portugal) Sporting)
11	MF	HUN	György Sándor (loan to (Saudi Arabia) Al-Ittihad)
13	GK	HUN	Bence Somodi (to Puskás)
19	FW	HUN	László Lencse (loan to (Greece) Asteras Tripolis)
20	FW	ESP	Walter Fernández (to (Belgium) Lokeren)
22	MF	HUN	Dániel Nagy (loan to Puskás)

- List of Hungarian football transfers summer 2012
- List of Hungarian football transfers winter 2012–13

== Statistics ==
=== Appearances and goals ===
Last updated on 2 June 2013.

No.	Pos	Nat	Player	Total		OTP Bank Liga		Europa League		Hungarian Cup		League Cup	
No.	Pos	Nat	Player	Apps	Goals	Apps	Goals	Apps	Goals	Apps	Goals	Apps	Goals
2	DF	(Spain) ESP	Álvaro Brachi	38	2	19	1	11	0	3	1	5	0
3	DF	(Brazil) BRA	Paulo Vinícius	42	2	20	0	12	1	5	1	5	0
4	DF	(Portugal) POR	Marco Caneira	40	2	20	1	11	1	4	0	5	0
5	MF	(Portugal) POR	Vítor Gomes	17	0	11	0	0	0	2	0	4	0
7	FW	(Brazil) BRA	Paraiba	31	4	18	1	1	0	4	0	8	3
9	FW	(Portugal) POR	Jucie Lupeta	3	0	3	0	0	0	0	0	0	0
12	GK	(Slovakia) SVK	Tomáš Tujvel	12	-14	5	-7	1	-2	2	-3	4	-2
14	MF	(Serbia) SRB	Nikola Mitrović	49	9	27	6	11	0	5	0	6	3
16	MF	(Portugal) POR	Filipe Oliveira	38	10	17	4	12	3	3	3	6	0
17	FW	(Serbia) SRB	Nemanja Nikolić	51	27	27	13	12	4	5	5	7	5
21	DF	(Hungary) HUN	Adrián Szekeres	16	2	10	2	1	0	1	0	4	0
22	DF	(Cape Verde) CPV	Stopira	21	0	9	0	8	0	1	0	3	0
23	MF	(El Salvador) SLV	Arturo Alvarez	18	2	11	2	0	0	2	0	5	0
24	DF	(Spain) ESP	Héctor Sánchez	20	0	16	0	0	0	1	0	3	0
26	MF	(Hungary) HUN	Balázs Tóth	38	1	21	1	10	0	2	0	5	0
27	GK	(Montenegro) MNE	Mladen Božović	42	-31	25	-16	11	-7	3	-3	3	-5
28	FW	(Hungary) HUN	Sándor Torghelle	42	6	21	6	10	0	4	0	7	0
30	DF	(Hungary) HUN	Roland Szolnoki	30	1	18	1	6	0	4	0	2	0
32	DF	(Hungary) HUN	Roland Juhász	14	3	9	3	0	0	2	0	3	0
70	MF	(Hungary) HUN	István Kovács	46	6	29	4	8	0	5	2	4	0
77	FW	(Hungary) HUN	Ádám Gyurcsó	45	4	26	4	11	0	5	0	3	0
88	FW	(Hungary) HUN	Zsolt Haraszti	13	3	7	1	0	0	3	0	3	2
99	MF	(Serbia) SRB	Uroš Nikolić	12	2	5	0	1	0	1	2	5	0
Youth Players:
2	DF	(Hungary) HUN	Zsolt Tar	2	1	0	0	0	0	0	0	2	1
3	DF	(Hungary) HUN	Márk Tamás	3	0	0	0	0	0	0	0	3	0
5	DF	(Hungary) HUN	Dávid Kiprich	3	0	0	0	0	0	0	0	3	0
6	FW	(Hungary) HUN	Csaba Vachtler	2	1	0	0	0	0	0	0	2	1
7	MF	(Hungary) HUN	Bálint Károly	2	0	0	0	0	0	0	0	2	0
9	MF	(Hungary) HUN	Patrik Paudits	3	0	0	0	0	0	0	0	3	0
10	FW	(Brazil) BRA	Rajmund dos Reis	2	0	0	0	0	0	0	0	2	0
11	MF	(Hungary) HUN	Máté Papp	2	0	0	0	0	0	0	0	2	0
13	GK	(Hungary) HUN	Bence Somodi	4	-3	0	0	0	0	0	0	4	-3
16	MF	(Hungary) HUN	Márk Barcsay	3	0	0	0	0	0	0	0	3	0
17	MF	(Hungary) HUN	Martin Hudák	3	0	0	0	0	0	0	0	3	0
18	FW	(Hungary) HUN	Tibor Molnár	1	0	0	0	0	0	0	0	1	0
20	MF	(Hungary) HUN	Donát Zsótér	7	0	0	0	0	0	1	0	6	0
30	FW	(Hungary) HUN	László Tóth	2	0	0	0	0	0	0	0	2	0
	DF	(Hungary) HUN	Dénes Baksa	2	0	0	0	0	0	0	0	2	0
	FW	(Hungary) HUN	Dominique Vallejos	1	0	0	0	0	0	0	0	1	0
	MF	(Hungary) HUN	Márton Lorentz	1	0	0	0	0	0	0	0	1	0
	DF	(Hungary) HUN	Zsolt Nagy	2	0	0	0	0	0	0	0	2	0
	MF	(Hungary) HUN	Krisztián Géresi	1	0	0	0	0	0	0	0	1	0
Players out to loan:
8	FW	(Serbia) SRB	Milan Perić	1	0	1	0	0	0	0	0	0	0
11	MF	(Hungary) HUN	György Sándor	26	2	11	1	12	1	1	0	2	0
23	DF	(Brazil) BRA	Kaká	13	0	8	0	1	0	1	0	3	0
Players no longer at the club:
10	MF	(Brazil) BRA	Renato Neto	24	2	14	1	8	0	0	0	2	1
20	FW	(Spain) ESP	Walter Fernández	23	0	11	0	10	0	0	0	2	0
23	DF	(Hungary) HUN	Tamás Vaskó	1	0	1	0	0	0	0	0	0	0

=== Top scorers ===
Includes all competitive matches. The list is sorted by shirt number when total goals are equal.

Last updated on 2 June 2013

Position	Nation	Number	Name	OTP Bank Liga	European League	Hungarian Cup	League Cup	Total
1	(Serbia)	17	Nemanja Nikolić	13	4	5	5	27
2	(Portugal)	16	Filipe Oliveira	4	3	3	0	10
3	(Serbia)	14	Nikola Mitrović	6	0	0	3	9
4	(Hungary)	28	Sándor Torghelle	6	0	0	0	6
5	(Hungary)	70	István Kovács	4	0	2	0	6
6	(Hungary)	77	Ádám Gyurcsó	4	0	0	0	4
7	(Brazil)	7	Paraiba	1	0	0	3	4
8	(Hungary)	32	Roland Juhász	3	0	0	0	3
9	(Hungary)	88	Zsolt Haraszti	1	0	0	2	3
10	(Hungary)	21	Adrián Szekeres	2	0	0	0	2
11	(El Salvador)	23	Arturo Alvarez	2	0	0	0	2
12	(Hungary)	11	György Sándor	1	1	0	0	2
13	(Portugal)	4	Marco Caneira	1	1	0	0	2
14	(Spain)	2	Álvaro Brachi	1	0	1	0	2
15	(Brazil)	10	Renato Neto	1	0	0	1	2
16	(Brazil)	3	Paulo Vinícius	0	1	1	0	2
17	(Serbia)	99	Uroš Nikolić	0	0	2	0	2
18	(Hungary)	26	Balázs Tóth	1	0	0	0	1
19	(Hungary)	30	Roland Szolnoki	1	0	0	0	1
20	(Hungary)	2	Zsolt Tar	0	0	0	1	1
21	(Hungary)	6	Csaba Vachtler	0	0	0	1	1
/	/	/	Own Goals	0	1	0	0	1
			TOTALS	52	11	14	15	92

=== Disciplinary record ===
Includes all competitive matches. Players with 1 card or more included only.

Last updated on 2 June 2013

Position	Nation	Number	Name	OTP Bank Liga		Europea League		Hungarian Cup		League Cup		Total (Hu Total)	
Position	Nation	Number	Name	Booked	Sent off (straight red)	Booked	Sent off (straight red)	Booked	Sent off (straight red)	Booked	Sent off (straight red)	Booked	Sent off (straight red)
DF	(Spain)	2	Álvaro Brachi	6	0	1	0	1	0	1	1	9 (6)	1 (0)
DF	(Brazil)	3	Paulo Vinícius	1	2	2	0	1	0	2	0	5 (0)	2 (2)
DF	(Portugal)	4	Marco Caneira	7	0	2	1	2	0	0	0	11 (7)	1 (0)
MF	(Portugal)	5	Vítor Gomes	2	0	0	0	0	0	2	0	4 (2)	0 (0)
FW	(Brazil)	7	Paraiba	4	0	0	0	1	0	1	0	6 (4)	0 (0)
MF	(Brazil)	10	Renato Neto	4	0	0	0	0	0	0	0	4 (4)	0 (0)
MF	(Hungary)	11	György Sándor	3	0	1	1	0	0	0	0	4 (3)	1 (0)
MF	(Serbia)	14	Nikola Mitrović	5	0	1	0	1	0	1	0	8 (5)	0 (0)
MF	(Portugal)	16	Filipe Oliveira	5	0	3	0	1	0	3	0	12 (5)	0 (0)
FW	(Serbia)	17	Nemanja Nikolić	2	0	2	0	0	0	0	0	4 (2)	0 (0)
MF	(Spain)	20	Walter Fernández	0	0	2	0	0	0	0	0	2 (0)	0 (0)
DF	(Hungary)	21	Adrián Szekeres	0	0	0	0	0	1	0	0	0 (0)	1 (0)
DF	(Cape Verde)	22	Stopira	2	0	2	0	1	0	2	0	7 (2)	0 (0)
MF	(El Salvador)	23	Arturo Alvarez	1	0	0	0	0	0	2	0	3 (1)	0 (0)
DF	(Brazil)	23	Kaká	1	0	1	0	0	0	0	0	2 (1)	0 (0)
DF	(Hungary)	23	Tamás Vaskó	1	0	0	0	0	0	0	0	1 (1)	0 (0)
MF	(Hungary)	26	Balázs Tóth	9	0	3	0	0	0	0	0	12 (9)	0 (0)
GK	(Montenegro)	27	Mladen Božović	2	0	1	0	0	0	0	0	3 (2)	0 (0)
FW	(Hungary)	28	Sándor Torghelle	5	1	1	0	2	0	0	0	8 (5)	1 (1)
DF	(Hungary)	30	Roland Szolnoki	3	2	0	0	0	0	0	0	3 (3)	2 (2)
DF	(Hungary)	32	Roland Juhász	3	0	0	0	1	1	2	0	6 (3)	1 (0)
MF	(Hungary)	70	István Kovács	5	0	3	0	0	0	0	0	8 (5)	0 (0)
FW	(Hungary)	77	Ádám Gyurcsó	1	0	3	0	0	0	0	0	4 (1)	0 (0)
FW	(Hungary)	88	Zsolt Haraszti	2	0	0	0	0	0	1	0	3 (2)	0 (0)
MF	(Hungary)		Dávid Kiprich	0	0	0	0	0	0	2	0	2 (0)	0 (0)
DF	(Hungary)		Zsolt Nagy	0	0	0	0	0	0	0	1	0 (0)	1 (0)
MF	(Hungary)		Márk Barcsay	0	0	0	0	0	0	1	0	1 (0)	0 (0)
MF	(Hungary)		Bálint Károly	0	0	0	0	0	0	1	0	1 (0)	0 (0)
			TOTALS	74	5	28	2	11	2	21	2	134 (74)	11 (5)

=== Overall ===
Games played	58 (30 OTP Bank Liga, 12 UEFA Europa League, 5 Hungarian Cup and 11 Hungarian League Cup)
Games won	31 (16 OTP Bank Liga, 4 UEFA Europa League, 4 Hungarian Cup and 7 Hungarian League Cup)
Games drawn	12 (6 OTP Bank Liga, 4 UEFA Europa League, 0 Hungarian Cup and 2 Hungarian League Cup)
Games lost	15 (8 OTP Bank Liga, 4 UEFA Europa League, 1 Hungarian Cup and 2 Hungarian League Cup)
Goals scored	92
Goals conceded	59
Goal difference	+33
Yellow cards	134
Red cards	11
Worst discipline	(Portugal) Marco Caneira (11 (yellow card) , 1 (red card) )
Best result	6–0 (H) v BFC Siófok - OTP Bank Liga - 29-03-2013
Worst result	0–3 (A) v KRC Genk - UEFA Europa League - 20-09-2012
Most appearances	(Serbia) Nemanja Nikolić (51 appearances)
Top scorer	(Serbia) Nemanja Nikolić (27 goals)
Points	105/175 (60.0%)

Last updated: 2 June 2013

== Nemzeti Bajnokság I ==
=== Matches ===
29 July 2012 1	Videoton	1–1	Pápa	Székesfehérvár, Fejér County
18:30 CEST	Nikolić 53'	(Report)	Seye 25'	Stadium: Sóstói Stadion; Attendance: 3,500; Referee: (Hungary) Ádám Radványi

5 August 2012 2	Újpest	0–1	Videoton	Budapest, Pest County
15:30 CEST		(Report)	Torghelle 66'	Stadium: Szusza Ferenc Stadium; Attendance: 3,757; Referee: (Hungary) Zoltán Iványi

12 August 2012 3	Videoton	0–1	Budapest Honvéd	Székesfehérvár, Fejér County
15:30 CEST		(Report)	Živanović 11'	Stadium: Sóstói Stadion; Attendance: 4,000; Referee: (Hungary) Zsolt Szabó

19 August 2012 4	Videoton	2–1	Eger	Székesfehérvár, Fejér County
18:30 CEST	Torghelle 87'; Nikolić 90+2' (pen.)	(Report)	Koós 56'	Stadium: Sóstói Stadion; Attendance: 1,500; Referee: (Hungary) Roland Weizer

26 August 2012 5	Videoton	2–1	Szombathely	Székesfehérvár, Fejér County
18:30 CEST	Gyurcsó 61', 63'	(Report)	Andorka 80'	Stadium: Sóstói Stadion; Attendance: 3,000; Referee: (Hungary) Sándor Andó-Szabó

2 September 2012 6	Siófok	1–3	Videoton	Siófok, Somogy County
18:30 CEST	Zamostny 84'	(Report)	Haraszti 14'; Mitrović 77'; Oliveira 89'	Stadium: Révész Street Stadium; Attendance: 1,800; Referee: (Hungary) Viktor Kassai

15 September 2012 7	Videoton	0–0	Diósgyőr	Székesfehérvár, Fejér County
14:00 CEST		(Report)		Stadium: Stadion Sóstói; Attendance: 3,500; Referee: (Hungary) Gábor Oláh

23 September 2012 8	Videoton	0–1	Győr	Székesfehérvár, Fejér County
16:30 CEST		(Report)	Koltai 67'	Stadium: Sóstói Stadion; Attendance: 3,000; Referee: (Hungary) Mihály Fábián

29 September 2012 9	Paks	1–1	Videoton	Paks, Tolna County
18:30 CEST	Tököli 8'	(Report)	Kovács 76'	Stadium: Stadion PSE; Attendance: 2,000; Referee: (Hungary) Zsolt Szabó

7 October 2012 10	Videoton	1–2	Ferencváros	Székesfehérvár, Fejér County
16:30 CEST	Nikolić 69' (pen.)	(Report)	Józsi 7' (pen.); Böde 74'	Stadium: Sóstói Stadion; Attendance: 5,000; Referee: (Hungary) Zoltán Iványi

19 October 2012 11	MTK Budapest	3–2	Videoton	Budapest, Pest County
17:00 CEST	Tischler 21', 86'; Csiki 33'	(Report)	Nikolić 81' (pen.); Sándor 90+2'	Stadium: Hidegkuti Nándor Stadium; Attendance: 1,000; Referee: (Hungary) Ádám Németh

28 October 2012 12	Videoton	3–1	Debrecen	Székesfehérvár, Fejér County
16:30 CEST	Torghelle 22'; Oliveira 61'; Nikolić 75'	(Report)	Coulibaly 65'	Stadium: Sóstói Stadion; Attendance: 6,000; Referee: (Hungary) Viktor Kassai

4 November 2012 13	Kaposvár	0–2	Videoton	Kaposvár, Somogy County
16:30 CET		(Report)	Nikolić 47', 79'	Stadium: Stadion Kaposvár Rákóczi; Attendance: 2,000; Referee: (Hungary) Tamás Bognár

11 November 2012 14	Videoton	2–0	Kecskemét	Székesfehérvár, Fejér County
18:30 CET	Nikolić 64'; Mitrović 87'	(Report)		Stadium: Sóstói Stadion; Attendance: 3,500; Referee: (Hungary) Ádám Farkas

17 November 2012 15	Pécs	0–0	Videoton	Pécs, Baranya County
18:30 CET		(Report)		Stadium: Stadion PMFC; Attendance: 2,500; Referee: (Hungary) Sándor Andó-Szabó

25 November 2012 16	Pápa	1–0	Videoton	Pápa, Veszprém County
18:30 CET	Seye 39'	(Report)		Stadium: Stadion Várkerti; Attendance: 800; Referee: (Hungary) János Takács

2 December 2012 17	Videoton	1–1	Újpest	Székesfehérvár, Fejér County
16:30 CET	Neto 26'	(Report)	Remili 8'	Stadium: Sóstói Stadion; Attendance: 2,854; Referee: (Hungary) Viktor Kassai

3 March 2013 18	Budapest Honvéd	0–4	Videoton	Budapest, Pest County
18:30 CET		(Report)	Mitrović 25', 75'; Oliveira 31'; Kovács 35'	Stadium: Bozsik Stadion; Attendance: 2,000; Referee: (Hungary) Sándor Andó-Szabó

9 March 2013 19	Eger	0–4	Videoton	Vác, Pest County
16:00 CET		(Report)	Szekeres 11', 54'; Brachi 17'; Kovács 60'	Stadium: Stadion Városi Vác; Attendance: 450; Referee: (Hungary) Szabolcs Szilasi

10 April 2013 20	Szombathely	0–1	Videoton	Szombathely, Vas County
16:00 CEST		(Report)	Alvarez 33'	Stadium: Stadion Rohonci Út; Attendance: 1,972; Referee: (Hungary) Péter Solymosi

29 March 2013 21	Videoton	6–0	Siófok	Székesfehérvár, Fejér County
19:00 CET	Mitrović 60'; Nikolić 67' (pen.), 84'; Gyurcsó 77'; Juhász 90'; Oliveira 90+3'	(Report)		Stadium: Stadion Sóstói; Attendance: 1,600; Referee: (Hungary) István Vad

7 April 2013 22	Diósgyőr	2–1	Videoton	Miskolc, Borsod-Abaúj-Zemplén County
18:30 CEST	Luque 10'; Fernando 22'	(Report)	Nemanja Nikolić 80'	Stadium: DVTK Stadion; Attendance: 4,500; Referee: (Hungary) Zsolt Szabó

14 April 2013 23	Győr	1–1	Videoton	Győr, Győr-Moson-Sopron County
16:30 CEST	Kamber 68'	(Report)	Tóth 64'	Stadium: ETO Park; Attendance: 9,400; Referee: (Hungary) Viktor Kassai

20 April 2013 24	Videoton	2–0	Paks	Székesfehérvár, Fejér County
16:00 CEST	Gyurcsó 25'; Caneira 68'	(Report)		Stadium: Stadion Sóstói; Attendance: 2,700; Referee: (Hungary) Tamás Bognár

28 April 2013 25	Ferencváros	0–1	Videoton	Budapest, Pest County
16:30 CEST		(Report)	Torghelle 1'	Stadium: Stadion Puskás Ferenc; Attendance: 10,128; Referee: (Hungary) Viktor Kassai

3 May 2013 26	Videoton	2–0	MTK Budapest	Székesfehérvár, Fejér County
17:00 CEST	Mitrović 5'; Nikolić 84'	(Report)		Stadium: Stadion Sóstói; Attendance: 2,800; Referee: (Hungary) Tamás Bognár

12 May 2013 27	Debrecen	2–1	Videoton	Debrecen, Hajdú-Bihar County
16:30 CEST	Bódi 39'; Kulcsár 57'	(Report)	Torghelle 29'	Stadium: Stadion Oláh Gábor Út; Attendance: 5,000; Referee: (Hungary) István Vad

18 May 2013 28	Videoton	2–1	Kaposvár	Székesfehérvár, Fejér County
18:30 CEST	Alvarez 29'; Kovács 54'	(Report)	Thian 77'	Stadium: Stadion Sóstói; Attendance: 3,000; Referee: (Hungary) Péter Solymosi

26 May 2013 29	Kecskemét	1–5	Videoton	Kecskemét, Bács-Kiskun County
18:30 CEST	Mohl 37'	(Report)	Juhász 16', 86'; Szolnoki 22'; Torghelle 53'; Paraiba 62'	Stadium: Széktói Stadion; Attendance: 1,500; Referee: (Hungary) Gábor Oláh

1 June 2013 30	Videoton	1–2	Pécs	Székesfehérvár, Fejér County
18:30 CEST	Nikolić 3'	(Report)	Márkvárt 66'; Koller 75'	Stadium: Stadion Sóstói; Attendance: 1,800; Referee: (Hungary) Ádám Németh

=== Classification ===
Pos	Team	Pld	W	D	L	GF	GA	GD	Pts	Qualification or relegation
1	Győr (C)	30	19	7	4	57	33	+24	64	Qualification for Champions League second qualifying round
2	Videoton	30	16	6	8	52	24	+28	54	Qualification for Europa League first qualifying round
3	Honvéd	30	15	7	8	50	36	+14	52	Qualification for Europa League first qualifying round
4	MTK	30	15	6	9	43	30	+13	51	
5	Ferencváros	30	13	10	7	51	36	+15	49	

Source: mlsz.hu (in Hungarian)
Rules for classification: 1st points; 2nd overall wins; 3rd goal difference; 4th head-to-head points; 5th head-to-head goal difference; 6th head-to-head away goals scored; 7th fair-play points; 8th drawing of lots
(C) Champions

=== Results summary ===
Overall								Home						Away					
Pld	W	D	L	GF	GA	GD	Pts	W	D	L	GF	GA	GD	W	D	L	GF	GA	GD
30	16	6	8	52	24	+28	54	8	3	4	25	12	+13	8	3	4	27	12	+15

Last updated: 2 June 2013.
Source: NB1

=== Results by round ===
Round	1	2	3	4	5	6	7	8	9	10	11	12	13	14	15	16	17	18	19	20	21	22	23	24	25	26	27	28	29	30
Ground	H	A	H	H	H	A	H	H	A	H	A	H	A	H	A	A	H	A	A	A	H	A	A	H	A	H	A	H	A	H
Result	D	W	L	W	W	W	D	L	D	L	L	W	W	W	D	L	D	W	W	W	W	L	D	W	W	W	L	W	W	L
Position	8	5	8	5	5	5	4	5	5	7	7	4	4	4	4	4	4	4	4	3	3	3	3	2	2	2	2	2	2	2

Updated to match(es) played on 2 June 2013. Source: Matches
A = Away; H = Home; W = Win; D = Draw; L = Loss

=== Points by opponent ===
Team	Results		Points
Team	Home	Away	Points
Budapest Honvéd	0–1	4–0	3
Debrecen	3–1	1–2	3
Diósgyőr	0–0	1–2	1
Eger	2–1	4–0	6
Ferencváros	1–2	1–0	3
Győr	0–1	1–1	1
Kaposvári Rákóczi	2–1	2–0	6
Kecskemét	2–0	5–1	6
Pápa	1–1	0–1	1
MTK Budapest	2–0	2–3	3
Paks	2–0	1–1	4
Pécs	1–2	0–0	1
Siófok	6–0	3–1	6
Szombathelyi Haladás	2–1	1–0	6
Újpest	1–1	1–0	4

== Hungarian Cup ==
31 October 2012 3	Videoton	2–0 (a.e.t.)	Szombathely	Székesfehérvár, Fejér County
18:00 CET	Nikolić 95', 100'	(Report)		Stadium: Sóstói Stadion; Attendance: 1,571; Referee: (Hungary) Péter Solymosi

2 February 2013 Round of 16 (1st leg)	Videoton	4–0	Zalaegerszeg	Székesfehérvár, Fejér County
16:00 CET	Oliveira 2', 65'; Nikolić 30', 35'	(Report)		Stadium: Sóstói Stadion; Attendance: 2,000; Referee: (Hungary) Sándor Andó-Szabó

9 February 2013 Round of 16 (2nd leg)	Zalaegerszeg	3–6 (3–10 agg.)	Videoton	Zalaegerszeg, Zala County
15:00	Nánási 18'; Pavićević 45' (pen.); Grbić 62'	(Report)	U. Nikolić 5', 21'; Vinícius 8'; Kovács 72'; Oliveira 81'; N. Nikolić 86'	Stadium: ZTE Arena; Attendance: 1,200; Referee: (Hungary) Viktor Kassai

23 February 2013 Quarter-final (1st leg)	Vác	0–3	Videoton	Vác, Pest County
14:00 CET		(Report)		Stadium: Stadion Városi Vác; Attendance: 0 Referee: (Hungary) József Erdős

27 February 2013 Quarter-final (2nd leg)	Videoton	3–0 (6–0 agg.)	Vác	Székesfehérvár, Fejér County
18:00		(Report)		Stadium: Sóstói Stadion; Referee: (Hungary) Ádám Németh

17 April 2013 Semi-final (1st leg)	Videoton	0–2	Győr	Székesfehérvár, Fejér County
18:00 CEST		(Report)	Střeštík 31'; Tokody 67'	Stadium: Sóstói Stadion; Attendance: 2,000; Referee: (Hungary) Sándor Andó-Szabó

8 May 2013 Semi-final (2nd leg)	Győr	1–2 (3–2 agg.)	Videoton	Győr, Győr-Moson-Sopron County
18:00 CEST	Kink 90+2'	(Report)	Kovács 57'; Brachi 73' (pen.)	Stadium: ETO Park; Attendance: 3,000; Referee: (Hungary) Szabolcs Szilasi

== League Cup ==
=== Group stage ===
5 September 2012 1	Kaposvár	1–1	Videoton	Kaposvár, Somogy County
18:00 CEST	Kovačević 1'	(Report)	Paraiba 26'	Stadium: Stadion Kaposvár Rákóczi; Attendance: 150; Referee: (Hungary) Balázs Berke

8 September 2012 2	Videoton	2–0	Pápa	Székesfehérvár, Fejér County
18:00 CEST	Neto 30'; Nikolić 58'	(Report)		Stadium: Sóstói Stadion; Attendance: 1,300; Referee: (Hungary) Norbert Kiss

10 October 2012 3	Zalaegerszeg	0–2	Videoton	Zalaegerszeg, Zala County
17:00 CEST		(Report)	Tar 33'; Vachtler 81'	Stadium: ZTE Arena; Attendance: 350; Referee: (Hungary) Gergely Szőts

16 October 2012 4	Videoton	2–0	Zalaegerszeg	Felcsút, Fejér County
14:00 CEST	Haraszti 34', 70'	(Report)		Stadium: Felcsúti Sportkomplexum; Attendance: 100; Referee: (Hungary) Tibor Farkas

13 November 2012 5	Pápa	2–1	Kaposvár	Pápa, Veszprém County
16:00 CET	Seye 72'; Szabó 76'	(Report)	Paraiba 7'	Stadium: Stadion Várkerti; Attendance: 200; Referee: (Hungary) István Vad

13 October 2012 6	Videoton	1–0	Kaposvár	Székesfehérvár, Fejér County
17:00 CEST	Nikolić 76'	(Report)		Stadium: Sóstói Stadion; Attendance: 1,300; Referee: (Hungary) Balázs Berke

==== Classification ====
Pos	Team	Pld	W	D	L	GF	GA	GD	Pts	Qualification
1	Videoton	6	4	1	1	9	3	+6	13	Advance to knockout phase
2	Pápa	6	4	0	2	9	8	+1	12	Advance to knockout phase
3	Kaposvár	6	1	2	3	6	8	−2	5	
4	Zalaegerszeg	6	1	1	4	5	10	−5	4	

Rules for classification: 1) points; 2) goal difference; 3) number of goals scored.

=== Knockout phase ===
20 February 2013 Quarter-final (1st leg)	Videoton	1–0	Debrecen	Székesfehérvár, Fejér County
16:45 CET	Nikolić 62' (pen.)	(Report)		Stadium: Sóstói Stadion; Attendance: 3,000; Referee: (Hungary) Zoltán Iványi

6 February 2013 Quarter-final (2nd leg)	Debrecen	0–0 (0–1 agg.)	Videoton	Debrecen, Hajdú-Bihar County
18:00 CET		(Report)		Stadium: Stadion Oláh Gábor Út; Attendance: 2,000; Referee: (Hungary) Ádám Farkas

21 March 2013 Semi-final (1st leg)	Videoton	3–1	Pécs	Székesfehérvár, Fejér County
17:15 CET	Paraiba 12'; Mitrović 19'; Nikolić 55'	(Report)	Vinícius 4' (o.g.)	Stadium: Stadion Sóstói; Attendance: 1,000; Referee: (Hungary) Zoltán Iványi

24 March 2013 Semi-final (2nd leg)	Pécs	1–2 (2–5 agg.)	Videoton	Pécs, Baranya County
18:00 CET	Koller 18'	(Report)	Nikolić 77'; Mitrović 90'	Stadium: Stadion PMFC; Attendance: 1,000; Referee: (Hungary) József Erdős

24 April 2013 Final	Ferencváros	5–1	Videoton	Székesfehérvár, Fejér County
17:30 CEST	Čukić 21'; Jenner 27'; Aborah 39', 70'; Somália 75'	(Report)	Mitrović 23'	Stadium: Stadion Sóstói; Attendance: 6,200; Referee: (Hungary) Ádám Farkas

== Super Cup ==
11 July 2012	Videoton FC	1–1 (a.e.t.) (5–3 p)	Debreceni VSC	Székesfehérvár, Fejér County
20:15 CEST	Kovács 72'	(Report)	Bódi 2'	Stadium: Sóstói Stadion; Attendance: 5,000; Referee: (Hungary) Tamás Bognár
	Penalties
	Nikolić (penalty scored); Mitrović (penalty scored); Gyurcsó (penalty scored); Brachi (penalty scored); Caneira (penalty scored)		Szakály (penalty scored); Korhut (penalty scored); Sidibe (penalty scored); Bódi (penalty missed)

== Europa League ==
The First and Second Qualifying Round draws took place at UEFA headquarters in Nyon, Switzerland on 25 June 2012.

=== Qualifying rounds ===
19 July 2012 Q2 Leg 1	ŠK Slovan Bratislava (Slovakia)	1–1	(Hungary) Videoton FC	Bratislava
20:15 CEST	Šebo 26'	(Report)	Oliveira 30'	Stadium: Štadión Pasienky; Attendance: 6,248; Referee: (Russia) Aleksei Nikolaev

26 July 2012 Q2 Leg 2	Videoton FC (Hungary)	0–0 (1–1 agg.)	(Slovakia) ŠK Slovan Bratislava	Székesfehérvár
20:30 CEST		(Report)		Stadium: Sóstói Stadion; Attendance: 8,028; Referee: (France) Anthony Galtier

2 August 2012 Q3 Leg 1	Videoton FC (Hungary)	1–0	(Belgium) K.A.A. Gent	Székesfehérvár
20:30 CEST	Nikolić 78'	(Report)		Stadium: Sóstói Stadion; Attendance: 5,900; Referee: (Italy) Paolo Silvio Mazzoleni

9 August 2012 Q3 Leg 2	K.A.A. Gent (Belgium)	0–3 (0–4 agg.)	(Hungary) Videoton FC	Ghent
19:30 CEST		(Report)	Oliveira 13'; Nikolić 68', 71'	Stadium: Jules Ottenstadion; Referee: (Poland) Szymon Marciniak

23 August 2012 Play off Leg 1	Trabzonspor (Turkey)	0–0	(Hungary) Videoton FC	Trabzon
20:00 CEST		(Report)		Stadium: Hüseyin Avni Aker Stadium; Attendance: 22,778; Referee: (Scotland) Euan Norris

30 August 2012 Play off Leg 2	Videoton FC (Hungary)	0–0 (a.e.t.) (0–0 agg.) (4–2 p)	(Turkey) Trabzonspor	Székesfehérvár
20:30 CEST		(Report)		Stadium: Sóstói Stadion; Attendance: 11,230; Referee: (Sweden) Martin Hansson
	Penalties
	Caneira (penalty scored); Brachi (penalty scored); Gyurcsó (penalty scored); Mitrović (penalty scored)		(penalty scored) Sapara; (penalty scored) Vittek; (penalty missed) Aydoğdu; (penalty missed) Zokora

=== Group stage ===
21 September 2012 Group Stage	K.R.C. Genk (Belgium)	3–0	(Hungary) Videoton FC	Genk
21:05 CEST	Vossen 22'; Buffel 78'; De Ceulaer 90+2'	(Report)		Stadium: Cristal Arena; Attendance: 10,537; Referee: (France) Laurent Duhamel

4 October 2012 Group Stage	Videoton FC (Hungary)	3–0	(Portugal) Sporting CP	Székesfehérvár
19:00 CEST	Vinícius 15'; Oliveira 21'; Nikolić 35'	(Report)		Stadium: Sóstói Stadion; Attendance: 10,160; Referee: (Iceland) Kristinn Jakobsson

25 October 2012 Group Stage	Videoton FC (Hungary)	2–1	(Switzerland) FC Basel	Székesfehérvár
19:00 CEST	Schär 2' (o.g.); Caneira 33'	(Report)	Schär 90+1'	Stadium: Sóstói Stadion; Attendance: 9,243; Referee: (Czech Republic) Miroslav Zelinka

8 November 2012 Group Stage	FC Basel (Switzerland)	1–0	(Hungary) Videoton FC	Basel
21:05 CET	Streller 80'	(Report)		Stadium: St. Jakob-Park; Attendance: 12,743; Referee: (Ukraine) Yevhen Aranovskiy

22 November 2012 Group Stage	Videoton FC (Hungary)	0–1	(Belgium) K.R.C. Genk	Székesfehérvár
19:00 CEST		(Report)	Barga 19'	Stadium: Sóstói Stadion; Attendance: 11,000; Referee: (Israel) Liran Liany

7 December 2012 Group Stage	Sporting CP (Portugal)	2–1	(Hungary) Videoton FC	Lisbon
21:05 CET	Labyad 64'; Viola 82'	(Report)	Sándor 80' (pen.)	Stadium: Estádio José Alvalade; Attendance: 8,080; Referee: (Greece) Michael Koukoulakis

==== Classification ====
Pos	Team	Pld	W	D	L	GF	GA	GD	Pts	Qualification
1	(Belgium) Genk	6	3	3	0	9	4	+5	12	Advance to knockout phase
2	(Switzerland) Basel	6	2	3	1	7	4	+3	9	Advance to knockout phase
3	(Hungary) Videoton	6	2	0	4	6	8	−2	6	
4	(Portugal) Sporting CP	6	1	2	3	4	10	−6	5	

Source: Soccerway
