= List of Hungarian football transfers summer 2011 =

This is a list of Hungarian football transfers for the 2011 summer transfer window by club. Only transfers of clubs in the OTP Bank Liga are included.

The summer transfer window opened on 1 June 2011, although a few transfers may have taken place prior to that date. The window closed at midnight on 31 August 2011. Players without a club may join one at any time, either during or in between transfer windows.

== OTP Bank Liga ==
=== BFC Siófok ===
In: Note: Flags indicate national team as defined under FIFA eligibility rules; some limited exceptions apply. Players may hold more than one non-FIFA nationality.

No.	Pos.	Nation	Player
28	DF	HUN	Zsolt Kiss (from Gyirmót SE)
––	DF	HUN	Szilárd Éles (loan from Debreceni VSC)

Out: Note: Flags indicate national team as defined under FIFA eligibility rules; some limited exceptions apply. Players may hold more than one non-FIFA nationality.

No.	Pos.	Nation	Player
9	FW	HUN	Gergely Délczeg (to Budapest Honvéd FC)

=== Budapest Honvéd FC ===
In: Note: Flags indicate national team as defined under FIFA eligibility rules; some limited exceptions apply. Players may hold more than one non-FIFA nationality.

No.	Pos.	Nation	Player
9	FW	HUN	Gergely Délczeg (from BFC Siófok)
11	MF	CRO	Boris Bjelkanović (from (Croatia) NK Pomorac)
20	MF	HUN	Gellért Ivancsics (from Zalaegerszegi TE)
28	FW	MNE	Radislav Sekulić (from (Montenegro) FK Mladost Podgorica)
81	MF	HUN	Norbert Németh (from Vasas SC)

Out: Note: Flags indicate national team as defined under FIFA eligibility rules; some limited exceptions apply. Players may hold more than one non-FIFA nationality.

No.	Pos.	Nation	Player

=== Debreceni VSC ===
In: Note: Flags indicate national team as defined under FIFA eligibility rules; some limited exceptions apply. Players may hold more than one non-FIFA nationality.

No.	Pos.	Nation	Player
26	MF	NED	Adnan Alisic (from (Netherlands) SBV Excelsior)
30	FW	BIH	Stevo Nikolić (from (Bosnia and Herzegovina) FK Borac Banja Luka)
40	FW	EST	Vjatšeslav Zahovaiko (from (Portugal) UD Leiria)

Out: Note: Flags indicate national team as defined under FIFA eligibility rules; some limited exceptions apply. Players may hold more than one non-FIFA nationality.

No.	Pos.	Nation	Player
11	FW	HUN	Péter Kabát (to Újpest FC)
77	MF	HUN	Péter Czvitkovics (to (Belgium) K. V. Kortrijk)

=== Ferencvárosi TC ===
In: Note: Flags indicate national team as defined under FIFA eligibility rules; some limited exceptions apply. Players may hold more than one non-FIFA nationality.

No.	Pos.	Nation	Player
11	FW	SRB	Lóránt Oláh (loan from Kaposvári Rákóczi FC)
27	MF	HUN	Krisztián Lisztes (from Vasas SC)

Out: Note: Flags indicate national team as defined under FIFA eligibility rules; some limited exceptions apply. Players may hold more than one non-FIFA nationality.

No.	Pos.	Nation	Player
18	FW	CZE	Marek Heinz (to (Czech Republic) Sigma Olomouc)
26	DF	HUN	Attila Dragóner (to Jászapáti VSE)
27	MF	MLT	André Schembri (to (Greece) Olympiacos Volos)

=== Győri ETO FC ===
In: Note: Flags indicate national team as defined under FIFA eligibility rules; some limited exceptions apply. Players may hold more than one non-FIFA nationality.

No.	Pos.	Nation	Player
19	FW	HUN	András Simon (from (Netherlands) SBV Excelsior)
21	MF	CZE	Marek Střeštík (on loan from (Czech Republic) FC Zbrojovka Brno)

Out: Note: Flags indicate national team as defined under FIFA eligibility rules; some limited exceptions apply. Players may hold more than one non-FIFA nationality.

No.	Pos.	Nation	Player

=== Kaposvári Rákóczi FC ===
In: Note: Flags indicate national team as defined under FIFA eligibility rules; some limited exceptions apply. Players may hold more than one non-FIFA nationality.

No.	Pos.	Nation	Player
19	MF	HUN	György Katona (from Nagyecsed RSE)
30	GK	HUN	Zsolt Posza (from Balatonelle SE)

Out: Note: Flags indicate national team as defined under FIFA eligibility rules; some limited exceptions apply. Players may hold more than one non-FIFA nationality.

No.	Pos.	Nation	Player
14	FW	SRB	Lóránt Oláh (loan to Ferencvárosi TC)

=== Kecskeméti TE ===
In: Note: Flags indicate national team as defined under FIFA eligibility rules; some limited exceptions apply. Players may hold more than one non-FIFA nationality.

No.	Pos.	Nation	Player
27	MF	HUN	Ádám Gyurcsó (loan from Videoton FC)
33	GK	HUN	Gábor Németh (from Vasas SC)
––	FW	CAN	Igor Pisanjuk (from (Canada) Mississauga Eagles FC)

Out: Note: Flags indicate national team as defined under FIFA eligibility rules; some limited exceptions apply. Players may hold more than one non-FIFA nationality.

No.	Pos.	Nation	Player

=== Lombard-Pápa TFC ===
In: Note: Flags indicate national team as defined under FIFA eligibility rules; some limited exceptions apply. Players may hold more than one non-FIFA nationality.

No.	Pos.	Nation	Player
26	DF	HUN	Levente Horváth (from Nyíregyháza Spartacus FC)
32	DF	HUN	Ádám Présinger (from Videoton FC)

Out: Note: Flags indicate national team as defined under FIFA eligibility rules; some limited exceptions apply. Players may hold more than one non-FIFA nationality.

No.	Pos.	Nation	Player
8	MF	HUN	Norbert Heffler (to Paksi SE)

=== Paksi SE ===
In: Note: Flags indicate national team as defined under FIFA eligibility rules; some limited exceptions apply. Players may hold more than one non-FIFA nationality.

No.	Pos.	Nation	Player
20	FW	HUN	Ádám Hrepka (loan from MTK Budapest FC)
27	MF	HUN	Norbert Heffler (from Lombard-Pápa TFC)

Out: Note: Flags indicate national team as defined under FIFA eligibility rules; some limited exceptions apply. Players may hold more than one non-FIFA nationality.

No.	Pos.	Nation	Player

=== Pécsi Mecsek FC ===
In: Note: Flags indicate national team as defined under FIFA eligibility rules; some limited exceptions apply. Players may hold more than one non-FIFA nationality.

No.	Pos.	Nation	Player
25	MF	HUN	Zoltán Tóth (from Kozármisleny SE)
27	DF	HUN	Viktor Petrók (from Kaposvári Rákóczi FC)

Out: Note: Flags indicate national team as defined under FIFA eligibility rules; some limited exceptions apply. Players may hold more than one non-FIFA nationality.

No.	Pos.	Nation	Player

=== Szombathelyi Haladás ===
In: Note: Flags indicate national team as defined under FIFA eligibility rules; some limited exceptions apply. Players may hold more than one non-FIFA nationality.

No.	Pos.	Nation	Player
2	MF	HUN	Zoltán Búrány (from Szolnoki MÁV FC)

Out: Note: Flags indicate national team as defined under FIFA eligibility rules; some limited exceptions apply. Players may hold more than one non-FIFA nationality.

No.	Pos.	Nation	Player
46	MF	HUN	Ádám Simon (to (Italy) U.S. Città di Palermo)

=== Újpest FC ===
In: Note: Flags indicate national team as defined under FIFA eligibility rules; some limited exceptions apply. Players may hold more than one non-FIFA nationality.

No.	Pos.	Nation	Player
2	DF	HUN	Csaba Fehér (from (Netherlands) NAC Breda)
22	FW	HUN	Péter Kabát (from Debreceni VSC)
35	DF	BIH	Bojan Mihajlovic (from (Bosnia and Herzegovina) FK Drina Zvornik)

Out: Note: Flags indicate national team as defined under FIFA eligibility rules; some limited exceptions apply. Players may hold more than one non-FIFA nationality.

No.	Pos.	Nation	Player
14	MF	SRB	Nikola Mitrovic (to Videoton FC)

=== Vasas SC ===
In: Note: Flags indicate national team as defined under FIFA eligibility rules; some limited exceptions apply. Players may hold more than one non-FIFA nationality.

No.	Pos.	Nation	Player
7	MF	HUN	Dávid Kulcsár (from Ferencvárosi TC)
19	MF	SRB	Miloš Jokić (from Szolnoki MÁV FC)

Out: Note: Flags indicate national team as defined under FIFA eligibility rules; some limited exceptions apply. Players may hold more than one non-FIFA nationality.

No.	Pos.	Nation	Player
21	MF	HUN	Norbert Németh (to Budapest Honvéd FC)
28	MF	HUN	Krisztián Lisztes (to Ferencvárosi TC)
33	GK	HUN	Gábor Németh (to Kecskeméti TE)

=== Videoton FC ===
In: Note: Flags indicate national team as defined under FIFA eligibility rules; some limited exceptions apply. Players may hold more than one non-FIFA nationality.

No.	Pos.	Nation	Player
2	DF	ESP	Álvaro Brachi (from (Spain) RCD Espanyol B)
14	MF	SRB	Nikola Mitrovic (from Újpest FC)
24	DF	ESP	Héctor Sánchez (from (Spain) Villarreal CF B)
29	MF	ESP	Walter Fernández (from (Spain) Gimnàstic de Tarragona)

Out: Note: Flags indicate national team as defined under FIFA eligibility rules; some limited exceptions apply. Players may hold more than one non-FIFA nationality.

No.	Pos.	Nation	Player
7	MF	SWE	Bojan Djordjic (to (England) Blackpool F.C.)
16	DF	HUN	Ádám Présinger (to Lombard-Pápa TFC)
18	MF	HUN	Ádám Gyurcsó (loan to Kecskeméti TE)
20	DF	HUN	Pál Lázár (to (Turkey) Samsunspor)

=== Zalaegerszegi TE ===
In: Note: Flags indicate national team as defined under FIFA eligibility rules; some limited exceptions apply. Players may hold more than one non-FIFA nationality.

No.	Pos.	Nation	Player
6	MF	ESP	Manu Hervás (from (Austria) FC Admira Wacker Mödling)
8	FW	AUT	Aleksandar Stanisavljević (from (Austria) First Vienna FC)
12	GK	SLO	Safet Jahič (from (Slovenia) NK Rudar Velenje)
22	DF	MNE	Radoš Bulatović (from (Serbia) FK Sevojno)
30	MF	HUN	Szabolcs Csordás (from MTK Budapest FC)
31	FW	HUN	Bálint Gaál (from FC Ajka)

Out: Note: Flags indicate national team as defined under FIFA eligibility rules; some limited exceptions apply. Players may hold more than one non-FIFA nationality.

No.	Pos.	Nation	Player
––	MF	HUN	Gellért Ivancsics (to Budapest Honvéd FC)
