= Nemanja Nikolić (footballer, born 1987) =

Hungarian footballer (born 1987)

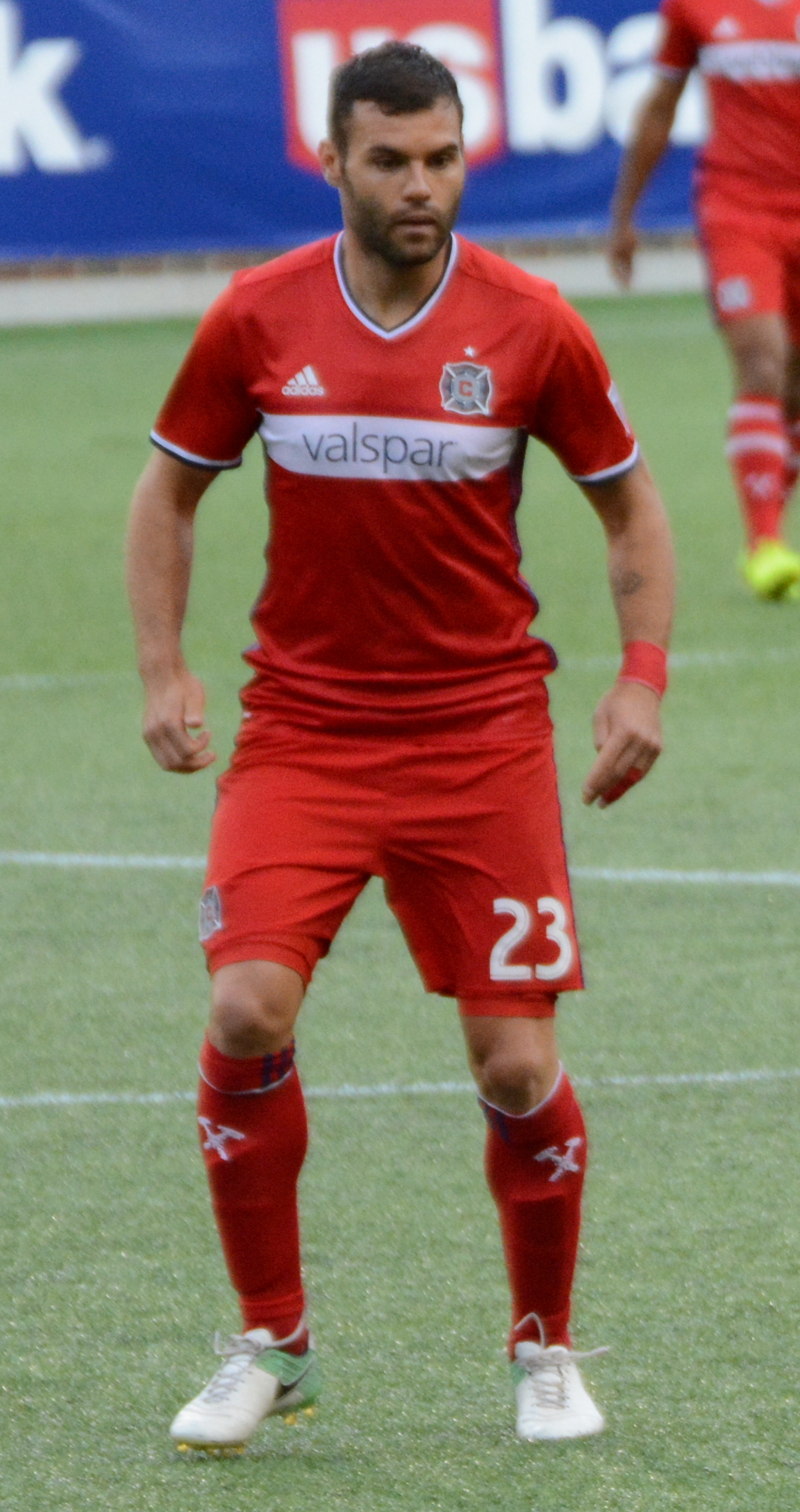
- Nikolić with the Chicago Fire in 2017

Personal information
- Date of birth: 31 December 1987 (age 38)
- Place of birth: Senta, SR Serbia, Yugoslavia
- Height: 1.80 m (5 ft 11 in)
- Position: Striker

Youth career
- 1996–2006: Senta

Senior career*
Years	Team	Apps	(Gls)
2006–2007	Barcs	19	(3)
2007–2008	Kaposvölgye	14	(11)
2008–2010	Kaposvár	49	(30)
2010–2015	Videoton	149	(87)
2015–2017	Legia Warsaw	56	(40)
2017–2019	Chicago Fire	96	(51)
2019–2022	Fehérvár	75	(30)
2022–2023	Pendikspor	8	(0)
2023	AEK Larnaca	12	(1)
Total		478	(253)

International career
2013–2021	Hungary	43	(8)
- * Club domestic league appearances and goals

Nemanja Nikolić (Serbian Cyrillic: Немања Николић, pronounced [němaɲa nǐkolitɕ]; Hungarian: Nikolics Nemanja; born 31 December 1987) is a former professional footballer who played as a striker.

Nikolić is a former Hungary national team international; he has made 43 appearances and scored 8 goals for the senior team. As a Serbian Hungarian from Vojvodina, Nikolić was also eligible to represent Serbia, his country of birth, but he never received a call-up to the team.

== Early life ==
Nikolić was born in Senta, Yugoslavia to a Serbian father and a Hungarian mother. He began his career with his brother at Senta.

== Club career ==
=== Kaposvár ===
On 7 February 2008, Nikolić was signed by Kaposvár. He played his first match against Videoton. He managed to score thirty goals in just 49 matches therefore many top Hungarian sides wanted to sign him such as Újpest, Ferencváros and Videoton.

=== Videoton ===
In 2010 Videoton signed Nikolić. He became top scorer in the 2009–10 season of the Hungarian League.

Nikolić won the 2010–11 season of the Hungarian League with Videoton. With the arrival of the Portuguese coach Paulo Sousa he was often left out from the first squad in the early matches of the 2011–12 season of the Hungarian League. However, as a substitute he managed to score against Paks, Siófok (twice), Újpest (twice) and Pápa in a row in the Hungarian League.

On 2 August 2012, Nikolić scored the only goal of the first leg of the third round of the 2012–13 UEFA Europa League season, when Videoton beat the Belgian K.A.A. Gent 1–0 at the Sóstói Stadion. He also scored in the second leg of the tie which was won by 3–0 by Videoton at the Jules Ottenstadion. On 4 September 2012, he scored a goal in the 2012–13 UEFA Europa League season when Videoton beat Portugal's Sporting CP 3–0 at Stadion Sóstói.

On 26 October 2014, Nikolić set a new record scoring in 12 consecutive league matches in the 2014–15 season.

=== Legia Warsaw ===
On 8 June 2015, Nikolić joined Ekstraklasa club, Legia Warsaw. On 19 July 2015, Nikolić debuted in the 2015–16 season of the Ekstraklasa by scoring two goals against Śląsk Wrocław at the Stadion Miejski, Wrocław. On 16 March 2016 Nikolic scored a hat-trick against Zawisza Bydgoszcz at the Pepsi Arena, Warsaw. The match ended with a 4–0 win for Legia Warsaw. On 15 May 2016 Legia became champions of the 2015–16 Ekstraklasa season by beating Pogoń Szczecin 3–0 at home. He was the top scorer of the 2015–16 Ekstraklasa season, scoring 28 goals in 37 matches.

=== Chicago Fire ===
Nikolić joined the Chicago Fire as a Designated Player for a reported transfer fee of $3 million from Legia Warsaw on 20 December 2016 on a three-year deal worth reportedly $1.9 million per year, per MLS Players Union documents.

Speaking on the transfer, in a press release by the club, Fire GM Nelson Rodriguez stated "Through this transfer, we have secured a champion in his prime, and one of the most prolific goal scorers in Europe over the last few years".

Fire coach Veljko Paunović noted his awareness of Nikolić from an early age from his time in Serbia. In an article published by the Fire Paunović praised Nikolić's skillset:

"His quality is scoring goals and assisting, but then he's a man that can participate in both phases of team play," Paunovic said. "He's very good in all phases of the game. Defensively, he helps the team to recover the ball as soon as possible in order that we can control the game and create opportunities for our team to win. Sometimes he will benefit from team play and he will be just the executor, but sometimes he's capable of creating his own situations in the game, the opportunities 1v1, and scoring his own goals."

==== 2017 season ====
Nikolić's high career strike-rate continued with the Fire, where he became an instant success - leading the league in scoring and acquiring numerous accolades through the first half of the season, and ultimately winning the 2017 MLS Golden Boot. His first goal for the club came in the Fire's 2017 home opener against Real Salt Lake, in which he scored an unassisted effort in the 11th minute.

Nikolić was named to the MLS Team of the Week in week 7 alongside fellow Fire forward Luis Solignac. He was additionally selected as MLS player of the week in week 7.

He was once again chosen for team of the week in week 11 for his brace in Chicago's 4–1 win against the reigning MLS Cup champion Seattle Sounders FC.

With 10 goals through the first 11 games of the season, Nikolić led the league in scoring. With his brace against the Colorado Rapids on 16 May, he became the first Fire player to score in four straight games since Mike Magee in 2013. This brace once again earned him MLS Team of the Week honors.

After week 15 Nikolić continued to lead the league in scoring, with 12 goals in 15 games. He was named to the week 15 Team of the Week for his goal against Atlanta United in Chicago's 2–0 home win alongside Fire players Bastian Schweinsteiger, David Accam, and João Meira.

He was named MLS Player of the Month for May for his six goals and one assist during the Fire's undefeated run during the stretch.

A week after Fire teammate David Accam was named player of the week for week 17 for his hat-trick against Orlando City SC, Nikolić earned the same honor on 3 July for his brace against Vancouver Whitecaps FC. It was the second time he won the award (the first time in week 7 as noted above). After week 18 Nikolić continued to lead the MLS Golden Boot race with 16 goals in 18 matches.

Alongside Bastian Schweinsteiger Nikolić was named to the "2017 MLS All-Star Fan XI". Nikolic finished the 2017 season as the Golden Boot winner with 24 goals and 4 assists.

==== 2018 season ====
Nikolić finished the 2018 season as the Fire's top scorer, finishing seventh in scoring league-wide, with 15 goals and 2 assists.

=== Fehérvár ===
In February 2020, Nikolić left the Fire on the expiry of his contract and returned to Hungary and former club Videoton now known as Fehérvár. Nikolić was given the number 71 shirt upon his return.

== International career ==
On 11 October 2013, Nikolić debuted in the Hungary national team against the Netherlands in an 8–1 defeat at the Amsterdam Arena in the 2014 FIFA World Cup qualification. On 14 October 2013, Nikolić scored his first goal in the national team against Andorra in the 51st minute. His second goal was recorded as an own goal by Lima.

On 18 November 2014, Nikolić scored against Russia in a 2–1 defeat in a friendly match at the Groupama Arena, Budapest, Hungary.

Nikolić was called up to Hungary's squad for UEFA Euro 2016. On 18 June 2016, he played in a 1–1 draw against Iceland at the Stade Vélodrome, Marseille in which his run and far post drive was re-directed in by Iceland for the last minute equalizer.

On 3 May 2018, Nikolić announced his retirement from the national team. But this situation has been changed when he agreed with Marco Rossi on his return.

On 1 June 2021, Nikolić was included in the final 26-man squad to represent Hungary at the rescheduled UEFA Euro 2020 tournament.

== Career statistics ==
=== Club ===
As of 30 December 2023

Appearances and goals by club, season and competition
Club	Season	League			National Cup		League Cup		Continental		Total	
Club	Season	Division	Apps	Goals	Apps	Goals	Apps	Goals	Apps	Goals	Apps	Goals
Barcs	2006–07	NB II	19	3	0	0	0	0	–		19	3
Kaposvölgye	2007–08	NB II	14	11	0	0	0	0	—		14	11
Kaposvár	2007–08	NB I	12	4	5	2	4	2	—		21	8
Kaposvár	2008–09	NB I	22	16	3	1	5	7	—		30	24
Kaposvár	2009–10	NB I	15	10	3	1	0	0	—		18	11
Kaposvár	Total		49	30	11	4	9	9	—		69	43
Videoton	2009–10	NB I	15	8	1	1	3	1	0	0	19	10
Videoton	2010–11	NB I	24	8	7	5	2	0	2	0	35	13
Videoton	2011–12	NB I	30	19	6	4	10	7	1	0	47	30
Videoton	2012–13	NB I	27	13	5	5	7	5	12	4	51	27
Videoton	2013–14	NB I	28	18	1	0	3	1	2	0	34	19
Videoton	2014–15	NB I	25	21	4	3	0	0	0	0	29	24
Videoton	Total		149	87	24	18	25	14	17	4	215	123
Legia Warsaw	2015–16	Ekstraklasa	37	28	7	6	1	0	10	2	55	36
Legia Warsaw	2016–17	Ekstraklasa	19	12	1	1	0	0	11	6	31	19
Legia Warsaw	Total		56	40	8	7	1	0	21	8	86	55
Chicago Fire	2017	MLS	34	24	2	0	1	0	—		37	24
Chicago Fire	2018	MLS	31	15	4	4	0	0	—		35	19
Chicago Fire	2019	MLS	31	12	1	1	0	0	—		32	13
Chicago Fire	Total		96	51	7	5	1	0	—		104	56
Fehérvár	2019–20	NB I	14	5	5	1	—		—		19	6
Fehérvár	2020–21	NB I	31	15	6	5	—		3	2	40	22
Fehérvár	2021–22	NB I	30	10	4	4	—		2	0	36	14
Fehérvár	Total		75	30	15	10	—		5	2	95	42
Pendikspor	2022–23	1. Lig	8	0	1	0	—		—		9	0
AEK Larnaca	2022–23	Cypriot First Division	12	1	—		—		4	0	16	1
Career total			478	253	66	44	36	23	47	14	627	334

=== International ===
As of match played 8 September 2021

Appearances and goals by national team and year
National team	Year	Apps	Goals
Hungary	2013	2	1
Hungary	2014	8	1
Hungary	2015	6	1
Hungary	2016	7	0
Hungary	2017	2	2
Hungary	2018	2	0
Hungary	2019	0	0
Hungary	2020	8	2
Hungary	2021	7	1
Total		42	8

Scores and results list Hungary's goal tally first, score column indicates score after each Nikolić goal.

List of international goals scored by Nemanja Nikolić
No.	Date	Venue	Opponent	Score	Result	Competition
1	15 October 2013	Ferenc Puskás Stadium, Budapest, Hungary	Andorra	1–0	2–0	2014 FIFA World Cup qualification
2	18 November 2014	Groupama Arena, Budapest, Hungary	Russia	1–2	1–2	Friendly
3	5 June 2015	Nagyerdei Stadion, Debrecen, Hungary	Lithuania	3–0	4–0	Friendly
4	9 November 2017	Stade Josy Barthel, Luxembourg City, Luxembourg	Luxembourg	1–1	1–2	Friendly
5	14 November 2017	Groupama Arena, Budapest, Hungary	Costa Rica	1–0	1–0	Friendly
6	6 September 2020	Puskás Aréna, Budapest, Hungary	Russia	2–3	2–3	2020–21 UEFA Nations League B
7	8 October 2020	Vasil Levski National Stadium, Sofia, Bulgaria	Bulgaria	3–0	3–1	UEFA Euro 2020 qualifying play-offs
8	28 March 2021	San Marino Stadium, Serravalle, San Marino	San Marino	3–0	3–0	2022 FIFA World Cup qualification

== Honours ==
Videoton

- Nemzeti Bajnokság I: 2010–11, 2014–15
- Hungarian League Cup: 2011–12
- Hungarian Super Cup: 2011, 2012

Legia Warsaw

- Ekstraklasa: 2015–16, 2016–17
- Polish Cup: 2015–16

Individual

- Nemzeti Bajnokság I top scorer: 2009–10 (18 goals), 2013–14 (18 goals; shared with Attila Simon), 2014–15 (21 goals)
- Ekstraklasa top scorer: 2015–16 (28 goals)
- Polish Cup top scorer: 2015–16 (6 goals)
- Ekstraklasa Player of the Year: 2015
- Ekstraklasa Player of the Season: 2015–16
- Ekstraklasa Forward of the Season: 2015–16
- Ekstraklasa Player of the Month: August 2015, September 2015, October 2015
- Ekstraklasa Canal+ Spectator Prize: 2015–16
- MLS Golden Boot: 2017 (24 goals)
- MLS Best XI: 2017
- 2017 Hungarian Player of the Year (M4 Sport Gála)
- Best MLS Player ESPY Award: 2018

== Managerial career ==
In October 2025, he completed the UEFA-MIP course and obtained a UEFA coaching license to manage football teams. On 11 November 2025, he was appointed as the sports director of Videoton.

== Personal life ==
On 28 January 2011, Nikolić obtained Hungarian citizenship. András Cser-Palkovics, mayor of Székesfehérvár said that "We know about him that he knows the country, speaks the language since he has big plans with Videoton this year". Nikolić said that "I knew that it is not easy to obtain Hungarian citizenship but I hoped that due to the fact that my mother is Hungarian it would be easier but it turned out to be a bit more difficult."
