= Roland Szolnoki =

Hungarian footballer (born 1992)

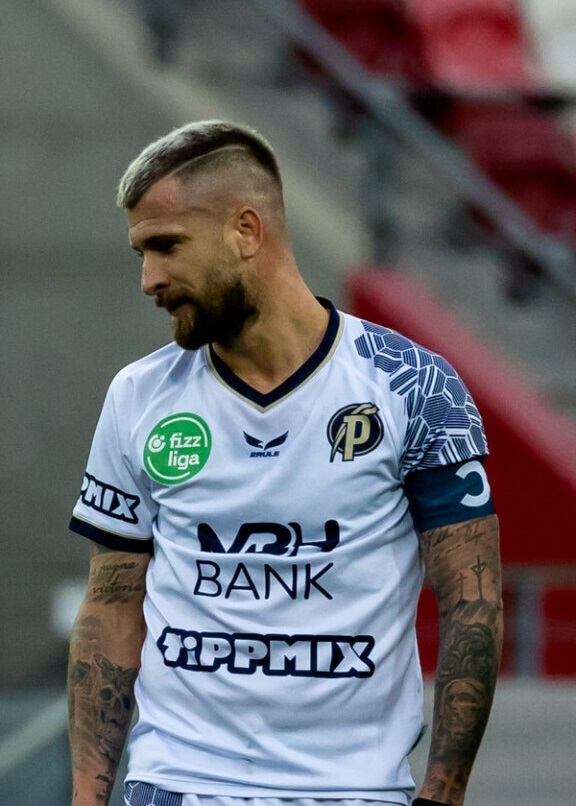
- Szolnoki playing for Puskás Akadémia in 2026

Personal information
- Full name: Roland Szolnoki
- Date of birth: 21 January 1992 (age 34)
- Place of birth: Mór, Hungary
- Height: 1.77 m (5 ft 9 1/2 in)
- Position: Right-back

Team information
- Current team: Puskás Akadémia
- Number: 22

Youth career
- 2002–2005: Videoton
- 2005–2008: Felcsút

Senior career*
| Years | Team | Apps | (Gls) |
| 2008–2018 | Videoton | 132 | (1) |
| 2008–2018 | Videoton II | 39 | (1) |
| 2018– | Puskás Akadémia | 168 | (5) |
| 2023– | Puskás Akadémia II | 3 | (0) |

International career^{‡}
| 2010–2011 | Hungary U-19 | 4 | (0) |
| 2012–2013 | Hungary U-21 | 9 | (0) |
| 2015 | Hungary | 1 | (0) |
- * Club domestic league appearances and goals as of 30 May 2026 ‡ National team caps and goals as of 5 June 2015

Roland Szolnoki (born 21 January 1992) is a Hungarian professional footballer who plays as a right-back for and captains Nemzeti Bajnokság I club Puskás Akadémia. A versatile international footballer, he can play with both feet. He normally plays as a defender, but he can sometimes play as a deep-lying playmaker.

He started his football career with Videoton and scored his first senior goal against Kecskemét, on 26 May 2013.

== Club career ==
In his first season, he played in the first team only in a Hungarian Cup match. The first was played in August 2009 by BFC against Siofok.

Prior to the 2011–12 season, on 7 July, he extended his contract with Videoton for another three years. In the qualifying round of the 2011-12 Champions League, he was nominated as a substitute for the sturm Graz, but he did not enter the field. In the championship, Paulo Sousa head coached the Paks FC in the 85th minute between adults. Then they were counted on the second team again. He gave Barnabás Babos a scorer for Győr II. Eight months later, after entering the first adult championship, he was back on track in the first team against Kaposvár as a beginner. During the season, he got more and more opportunities. The season ended with 13 NB 1 matches.

In the 2012–13 season in the European League qualifier, the first match against Slovan Bratislava was still on the bench, but on the retrograde he was already on the pitch. KAA was also a beginner against Gent, but on the retreat only Sousa was on the bench. In the first round of the championship, he was just a beginner in the domestic match against Lombard Pope. However, it was replaced in the midst of the match. He collected his second yellow card against Újpest FC, so the judge issued it. By downloading his disqualification, he returned to Szombathely's Progress, but he could not be long since he was fouled at 76 minutes and re-issued.

In summer 2018, he signed a two-year contract with Puskas Akademia FC.

== International career ==
Szolnoki previously represented Hungary at various youth levels. He was called to national team by Pál Dárdai. Szolnoki made his first senior international debut in June 2015 against Lithuania and played all 90 minutes. Hungary won the match 4–0.

== Career statistics ==
=== Club ===
As of match played 21 January 2026

Appearances and goals by club, season and competition
| Club | Season | League | | | Magyar Kupa | | Ligakupa | | Europe | | Other | | Total | |
| Club | Season | Division | Apps | Goals | Apps | Goals | Apps | Goals | Apps | Goals | Apps | Goals | Apps | Goals |
|---|---|---|---|---|---|---|---|---|---|---|---|---|---|---|
| Videoton | 2009–10 | Nemzeti Bajnokság I | — | | — | | 8 | 0 | — | | — | | 8 | 0 |
| Videoton | 2010–11 | Nemzeti Bajnokság I | 0 | 0 | 0 | 0 | — | | — | | — | | 0 | 0 |
| Videoton | 2011–12 | Nemzeti Bajnokság I | 13 | 0 | 4 | 0 | 7 | 0 | — | | — | | 24 | 0 |
| Videoton | 2012–13 | Nemzeti Bajnokság I | 18 | 1 | 6 | 0 | 2 | 0 | 6 (Note: Appearance(s) in UEFA Europa League) | 0 | 1 (Note: Appearance in Szuperkupa) | 0 | 33 | 1 |
| Videoton | 2013–14 | Nemzeti Bajnokság I | 21 | 0 | 1 | 0 | 2 | 1 | 1 | 0 | — | | 25 | 1 |
| Videoton | 2014–15 | Nemzeti Bajnokság I | 25 | 0 | 5 | 0 | 5 | 0 | — | | — | | 35 | 0 |
| Videoton | 2015–16 | Nemzeti Bajnokság I | 21 | 0 | 2 | 0 | — | | 6 (Note: Four appearances in UEFA Champions League, two appearances in UEFA Europa League) | 0 | 1 | 0 | 30 | 0 |
| Videoton | 2016–17 | Nemzeti Bajnokság I | 21 | 0 | 1 | 0 | — | | 6 | 0 | — | | 28 | 0 |
| Videoton | 2017–18 | Nemzeti Bajnokság I | 13 | 0 | 3 | 0 | — | | 5 | 0 | — | | 21 | 0 |
| Videoton | Total | | 132 | 1 | 22 | 0 | 24 | 1 | 24 | 0 | 2 | 0 | 204 | 2 |
| Videoton II | 2009–10 | Nemzeti Bajnokság II | 7 | 0 | 2 | 0 | — | | — | | — | | 9 | 0 |
| Videoton II | 2010–11 | Nemzeti Bajnokság II | 17 | 0 | 1 | 0 | — | | — | | — | | 18 | 0 |
| Videoton II | 2011–12 | Nemzeti Bajnokság II | 8 | 0 | 1 | 0 | — | | — | | — | | 9 | 0 |
| Videoton II | 2013–14 | Nemzeti Bajnokság III | 1 | 0 | — | | — | | — | | — | | 1 | 0 |
| Videoton II | 2017–18 | Nemzeti Bajnokság III | 6 | 1 | — | | — | | — | | — | | 6 | 1 |
| Videoton II | Total | | 39 | 1 | 4 | 0 | — | | — | | — | | 43 | 1 |
| Puskás Akadémia | 2018–19 | Nemzeti Bajnokság I | 20 | 0 | 3 | 0 | — | | — | | — | | 23 | 0 |
| Puskás Akadémia | 2019–20 | Nemzeti Bajnokság I | 27 | 1 | 4 | 0 | — | | — | | — | | 31 | 1 |
| Puskás Akadémia | 2020–21 | Nemzeti Bajnokság I | 23 | 1 | 4 | 0 | — | | 1 | 0 | — | | 28 | 1 |
| Puskás Akadémia | 2021–22 | Nemzeti Bajnokság I | 25 | 0 | 1 | 0 | — | | — | | — | | 26 | 0 |
| Puskás Akadémia | 2022–23 | Nemzeti Bajnokság I | 9 | 0 | 0 | 0 | — | | 2 (Note: Appearances in UEFA Europa Conference League) | 0 | — | | 11 | 0 |
| Puskás Akadémia | 2023–24 | Nemzeti Bajnokság I | 26 | 2 | 2 | 0 | — | | — | | — | | 28 | 2 |
| Puskás Akadémia | 2024–25 | Nemzeti Bajnokság I | 15 | 0 | 2 | 0 | — | | 4 (Note: Appearances in UEFA Conference League) | 0 | — | | 21 | 0 |
| Puskás Akadémia | 2025–26 | Nemzeti Bajnokság I | 13 | 0 | 0 | 0 | — | | — | | — | | 13 | 0 |
| Puskás Akadémia | Total | | 158 | 4 | 16 | 0 | — | | 7 | 0 | — | | 181 | 4 |
| Puskás Akadémia II | 2022–23 | Nemzeti Bajnokság III | 1 | 0 | — | | — | | — | | — | | 1 | 0 |
| Puskás Akadémia II | 2025–26 | Nemzeti Bajnokság III | 2 | 0 | — | | — | | — | | — | | 2 | 0 |
| Puskás Akadémia II | Total | | 3 | 0 | — | | — | | — | | — | | 3 | 0 |
| Career total | | | 332 | 6 | 42 | 0 | 24 | 1 | 31 | 0 | 2 | 0 | 431 | 7 |

=== International ===
As of match played 5 June 2015

Appearances and goals by national team and year
| National team | Year | Apps | Goals |
|---|---|---|---|
| Hungary | 2015 | 1 | 0 |
| Total | | 1 | 0 |

== Honours ==
Videoton

- Nemzeti Bajnokság I: 2014–15, 2017–18
- Ligakupa: 2011–12; runner-up: 2012–13, 2013–14
- Szuperkupa: 2012; runner-up: 2015
- Magyar Kupa runner-up: 2014–15
