= Gabino Rodríguez (footballer) =

Spanish footballer

Gabino
Personal information
- Full name: Gabino Rodríguez Rodríguez
- Date of birth: 18 June 1964 (age 62)
- Place of birth: Seville, Spain
- Height: 1.72 m (5 ft 8 in)
- Position: Attacking midfielder

Youth career
- Betis

Senior career*
Years	Team	Apps	(Gls)
1982–1984	Betis B	65	(19)
1984–1988	Betis	113	(13)
1984–1985	→ Logroñés (loan)	31	(12)
1988–1991	Español	81	(18)
1991–1993	Betis	54	(12)
1993–1994	Xerez	3	(0)
1996–1997	Atlético Ceutí	3	(0)
Total		350	(74)

International career
1985–1986	Spain U21	5	(1)
- * Club domestic league appearances and goals

Gabino Rodríguez Rodríguez (born 18 June 1964), known simply as Gabino, is a Spanish former professional footballer who played as an attacking midfielder.

== Club career ==
Gabino was born in Seville, Andalusia. He played ten seasons as a professional, mainly with his hometown club Real Betis and Barcelona-based RCD Español, six of those in La Liga. After three years with the Catalans, he returned to the Estadio Benito Villamarín in 1991 and spent a further two years there, both in the Segunda División, scoring six goals in each one of the campaigns, which did not end in promotion however.

Gabino ended his career following a brief spell with Xerez CD (he also represented CD Logroñés in the second tier early in his career, loaned by Betis) with 161 matches in the top flight, scoring 19 times. After serious economic and personal problems – he was briefly a maintenance worker (kits, balls, etc.) with lowly AD Ceuta, as well as being their assistant manager – he finished his bachelor's degree whilst working in a laundry, and eventually received his coaching licence; his first job was with amateurs CD Quintanar del Rey.

After a few years working as director of football with Ceuta, Gabino once again returned to Betis, as a youth coordinator.

== Personal life ==
Gabino's son, Álvaro Brachi, was also a footballer. He too represented Betis (only the reserves), and spent most of his career with Videoton FC in Hungary.

== Honours ==
Spain

- UEFA European Under-21 Championship: 1986
