= Edson Paraíba =

Brazilian footballer (born 1992)

Personal information
- Full name: Edson Rodrigues Farias
- Date of birth: 12 January 1992 (age 34)
- Place of birth: Juazeiro do Norte, Brazil
- Height: 1.70 m (5 ft 7 in)
- Positions: Winger; right-back

Team information
- Current team: Académica Coimbra
- Number: 11

Youth career
- –2012: Londrina

Senior career*
Years	Team	Apps	(Gls)
2011–2012	Iraty	0	(0)
2012–2014	Videoton	52	(5)
2014–2016	Paços de Ferreira	39	(5)
2016–2017	Bucheon FC	4	(0)
2017–2021	Feirense	117	(6)
2021–2022	Penafiel	30	(5)
2022–2022	Vilafranquense	22	(3)
2023–2024	AVS	26	(2)
2024–2025	Fafe	29	(2)
2025–	Académica Coimbra	27	(1)
- * Club domestic league appearances and goals as of 7 May 2026

Edson Rodrigues Farias (born 12 January 1992), known as Edson Farias, is a Brazilian professional footballer who plays as a winger or right-back for Liga Portugal 2 club Académica Coimbra.

== Career ==
On 23 September 2012, he joined Hungarian club Videoton FC. In August 2014, he joined Paços de Ferreira.

On 23 June 2021, he signed with Penafiel.

On 14 July 2024, he joined AD Fafe as a free agent.

== Club statistics ==
As of 29 April 2014

Club	Season	League		Cup		League Cup		Europe		Total	
Club	Season	Apps	Goals	Apps	Goals	Apps	Goals	Apps	Goals	Apps	Goals
Videoton	2012–13	18	1	4	0	8	3	1	0	31	4
Videoton	2013–14	8	0	0	0	7	1	2	0	17	1
Videoton	Total	26	1	4	0	15	4	3	0	48	5
Career totals		26	1	4	0	15	4	3	0	48	5
