= Álvaro Brachi =

Spanish footballer

Personal information
- Full name: Álvaro Rodríguez Brachi
- Date of birth: 6 January 1986 (age 40)
- Place of birth: Seville, Spain
- Height: 1.79 m (5 ft 10 1/2 in)
- Position: Right-back

Youth career
- Betis

Senior career*
Years	Team	Apps	(Gls)
2005–2006	Betis C	14	(0)
2006–2007	Betis B	29	(1)
2007–2011	Espanyol B	35	(0)
2010–2011	→ Anorthosis (loan)	21	(1)
2011–2015	Videoton	55	(2)
2016–2017	Domžale	17	(0)
2018	Utrera	10	(0)
Total		181	(4)
- * Club domestic league appearances and goals

Álvaro Rodríguez Brachi (born 6 January 1986) is a Spanish former professional footballer who played as a right-back.

== Club career ==
=== Spain ===
Born in Seville, Andalusia, Brachi only played lower league football in his country, representing the reserve teams of both Real Betis and RCD Espanyol.

He spent two seasons in the Segunda División B, being relegated in 2007–08 and 2009–10 with Espanyol B.

=== Anorthosis and Videoton ===
In the summer of 2010, Brachi joined Anorthosis Famagusta FC on loan. His debut in professional football took place on 29 August, as he came on as a late substitute in a 3–2 away win against Alki Larnaca FC in the Cypriot First Division.

Subsequently, Brachi spent four years in Hungary at the service of Videoton FC, signing at the same time as compatriot Héctor Sánchez. He was regularly played by Paulo Sousa– a total of 39 matches in his first two years in the Nemzeti Bajnokság I – but, after his replacement with fellow Portuguese coach José Gomes, became a fringe player.

Brachi left Videoton on 30 June 2015.

=== Domžale ===
Brachi signed for NK Domžale in January 2016, after responding to an advertisement from the Slovenian club posted on LinkedIn.

== Personal life ==
Brachi's father, Gabino Rodríguez, was also a footballer. He too played for Betis.

== Career statistics ==
As of 29 January 2016

Club	Season	League		Cup		League Cup		Europe		Total	
Club	Season	Apps	Goals	Apps	Goals	Apps	Goals	Apps	Goals	Apps	Goals
Anorthosis	2010–11	21	1	4	0	0	0	1	0	26	1
Anorthosis	Total	21	1	4	0	0	0	1	0	26	1
Videoton	2011–12	20	1	6	0	7	0	2	0	35	1
Videoton	2012–13	19	1	3	1	5	0	11	0	38	2
Videoton	2013–14	9	0	2	0	8	1	0	0	19	1
Videoton	2014–15	7	0	3	0	8	0	0	0	18	0
Videoton	Total	55	2	14	1	28	1	13	0	110	4
Career totals		76	3	18	1	28	1	14	0	136	5
