= Jeff Silva (footballer) =

Brazilian footballer

Personal information
- Full name: Jefferson da Silva Nascimento
- Date of birth: 29 June 1986 (age 40)
- Place of birth: Campo Mourão, Brazil
- Height: 1.78 m (5 ft 10 in)
- Position: Left back

Youth career
- 2002–2006: Londrina

Senior career*
Years	Team	Apps	(Gls)
2006–2007	Londrina		
2007	Beira-Mar		
2007	Londrina		
2007–2009	Avaí	28	(2)
2009–2010	Red Star Belgrade	7	(0)
2010	Monte Azul	7	(0)
2010	Clube Andraus Brasil		
2010	Fortaleza	6	(0)
2010–2012	Náutico	33	(0)
2012	Videoton	1	(0)
2012	→ Diósgyőr (loan)	5	(1)
2013	ABC		
2013	Paulista		
2014	Ceilândia		
2015	Boavista		
2016	Hercílio Luz		
2017–	Novo Hamburgo		
- * Club domestic league appearances and goals as of 4 May 2015

Jefferson da Silva Nascimento (born June 29, 1986) known as Jeff Silva, is a Brazilian football defender who plays for Boavista.

== Career ==
Born in Campo Mourão, he begin playing in the youth team of Londrina Esporte Clube where he became senior in 2006. In 2007, he had a spell in Portugal with S.C. Beira-Mar. In December 2007 Avaí Futebol Clube signed him from Londrina and he was part of the team that won promotion to the Campeonato Brasileiro Série A. However, he did not stay and moved abroad to play with Red Star Belgrade in the Serbian SuperLiga. In the winter break of the 2009–10 he was released, and while returning to Brazil, he was picked right in the airport by Atlético Monte Azul to sign him and helped them win the Campeonato Paulista A2. After only 6 months he was signed in July 2010 by Fortaleza Esporte Clube, however his spell with them in the Campeonato Brasileiro Série C there was also short, as by the end of the year he was signing with Clube Náutico Capibaribe.+ On December 12, 2012, he moved to ABC FC, Brasil Serie B.

== Honours ==
Monte Azul

- Campeonato Paulista Série A2: 2009

Fortaleza

- Campeonato Cearense: 2010

== External sources ==
- Jeff Silva at Soccerway
- Jeff Silva at Srbijafudbal
