= Marco Caneira =

Portuguese footballer (born 1979)

Personal information
- Full name: Marco António Simões Caneira
- Date of birth: 9 February 1979 (age 47)
- Place of birth: Negrais, Portugal
- Height: 1.78 m (5 ft 10 in)
- Position: Defender

Youth career
- 1990–1997: Sporting CP

Senior career*
Years	Team	Apps	(Gls)
1996–2000	Sporting CP	1	(0)
1996–1997	→ Lourinhanense (loan)		
1998	→ Salgueiros (loan)	1	(0)
1998–1999	→ Beira-Mar (loan)	12	(0)
1999–2000	→ Alverca (loan)	17	(0)
2000–2003	Inter Milan	0	(0)
2000–2001	→ Reggina (loan)	22	(0)
2001–2002	→ Benfica (loan)	27	(0)
2002–2003	→ Bordeaux (loan)	30	(0)
2003–2005	Bordeaux	35	(0)
2004–2005	→ Valencia (loan)	22	(1)
2005–2008	Valencia	24	(0)
2006–2007	→ Sporting CP (loan)	40	(1)
2008–2011	Sporting CP	28	(0)
2011–2015	Videoton	67	(1)
2016–2019	Negrais		
2021	Atlético Malveira	2	(0)
Total		328	(3)

International career
1998–2000	Portugal U20	15	(0)
2000–2002	Portugal U21	17	(0)
2002	Portugal B	2	(0)
2002–2008	Portugal	25	(0)
- * Club domestic league appearances and goals

Marco António Simões Caneira (born 9 February 1979) is a Portuguese former professional footballer. Preferably a central defender, he was equally at ease on the right or left flank.

A youth graduate at Sporting CP, he started his career at the club, also appearing briefly for Benfica in his country, and represented Valencia in La Liga for a couple of years before returning to Sporting. Over ten seasons, he amassed Primeira Liga totals of 126 matches and one goal. He retired in 2015, after a four-year stint with Videoton.

Internationally, Caneira appeared for Portugal at two World Cups and earned 25 caps in six years.

== Club career ==
=== Early years ===
Born in the village of Negrais in Sintra, Lisbon, Caneira began his career at the Sporting CP youth system, eventually graduating to the senior squad and making his first-team debut while still only a junior (aged 17). After signing a professional contract, he immediately went on loan to fellow Primeira Liga club S.C. Beira-Mar.

Caneira, along with fellow Sporting players Paulo Costa and Vasco Faísca, was then involved in a somewhat complicated 2000 transfer between F.C. Alverca, who now owned 50% of their rights, and Inter Milan. He was immediately sent to Reggina Calcio, in a co-ownership bid. After a season, he was bought back from Reggina and sent to S.L. Benfica on a one-year-long loan.

=== Bordeaux and Valencia ===
Caneira left for another loan spell in summer 2001, this time with FC Girondins de Bordeaux. At the end of the campaign, the French signed him to a four-year contract.

After his second season, Caneira was loaned out again, this time to Valencia CF which had faced Bordeaux twice in the 2003–04 edition of the UEFA Champions League. The move was made permanent on 13 June 2005.

=== Sporting CP ===
After one and a half seasons at Valencia, Caneira returned to Portugal and Sporting in January 2006, where he displayed consistent defensive performances, also scoring a rare goal against former owners Inter Milan in the following season's Champions League, in a 12 September home win (1–0). In August 2007, although he had reached an agreement for a further five-year loan with the Lions, he returned to the Quique Sánchez Flores-led team.

After appearing rarely on the second Valencia stint, Caneira returned for a third one with Sporting, for €3.5 million, signing a four-year deal on 25 June 2008. He appeared in 32 official games in his first season (21 in the league, helping his team to the second place), but fell out of favour the following years, inclusively not being given a jersey for the 2010–11 campaign, and he left the club in June 2011.

=== Later career ===
On the last day of the 2011 summer transfer window, the 32-year-old Caneira signed with Videoton FC in Hungary, sharing teams with three compatriots including former international teammate Paulo Sousa, who acted as the club's manager. On 25 October 2012, he scored only his fourth goal as a professional, netting from close range after a corner kick in an eventual 2–1 home victory against FC Basel in the UEFA Europa League group stage.

Caneira left the Sóstói Stadion at the end of the 2014–15 season, having contributed only three appearances to the club's second Nemzeti Bajnokság I conquest. After one year out football, the 36-year-old came out of retirement and joined amateurs SRD Negrais in the Lisbon Football Association.

== International career ==
A Portugal international since 2002, Caneira was selected for the squad that appeared in that year's FIFA World Cup, but did not play in the tournament held in Japan and South Korea. He made his debut on 27 March, in a 4–1 friendly loss to Finland in Porto.

Left out of the squad for UEFA Euro 2004, Caneira returned for the 2006 World Cup, playing in Portugal's last group stage match against Mexico (2–1 win).

== Personal life ==
On 16 January 2005, Caneira's 8-month-old daughter was a victim of sudden death, shortly before Valencia's La Liga match against CA Osasuna, which ended 0–0.

In October 2009, while still an active player, Caneira ran for office in the Almargem do Bispo civil parish in his native Sintra, losing the election by 32 votes.

== Career statistics ==
=== Club ===
Appearances and goals by club, season and competition
Club	Season	League			National cup (Note: Includes Taça de Portugal, Coppa Italia, Coupe de France, Copa del Rey, Hungarian Cup.)		League cup (Note: Includes Taça da Liga, Coupe de la Ligue.)		Continental		Total	
Club	Season	Division	Apps	Goals	Apps	Goals	Apps	Goals	Apps	Goals	Apps	Goals
Sporting CP	1995–96	Primeira Liga	1	0								
Sporting CP	1996–97	Primeira Liga	0	0								
Sporting CP	Total		1	0								
Salgueiros (loan)	1997–98	Primeira Liga	1	0								
Beira-Mar (loan)	1998–99	Primeira Liga	12	0	4	0					16	0
Alverca (loan)	1999–2000	Primeira Liga	17	0								
Reggina (loan)	2000–01	Serie A	22	0								
Benfica (loan)	2001–02	Primeira Liga	27	0	2	0					29	0
Bordeaux (loan)	2002–03	Ligue 1	30	0					4	0	34	0
Bordeaux	2003–04	Ligue 1	35	0					5	0	40	0
Valencia (loan)	2004–05	La Liga	22	1	1	0			6	0	29	1
Valencia	2005–06	La Liga	5	0					3	0	8	0
Valencia	2007–08	La Liga	19	0	6	0			4	0	29	0
Valencia	Total		24	0	6	0			7	0	37	0
Sporting CP (loan)	2005–06	Primeira Liga	15	1	4	0					19	1
Sporting CP (loan)	2006–07	Primeira Liga	25	0	5	0			5	1	35	1
Sporting CP (loan)	Total		40	1	9	0			5	1	54	2
Sporting CP	2008–09	Primeira Liga	21	0	1	0	3	0	6	0	31	0
Sporting CP	2009–10	Primeira Liga	7	0	1	0			4	0	12	0
Sporting CP	2010–11	Primeira Liga										
Sporting CP	Total		28	0	2	0	3	0	10	0	43	0
Videoton	2011–12	Nemzeti Bajnokság I	21	0	5	0	6	0	0	0	32	0
Videoton	2012–13	Nemzeti Bajnokság I	20	1	4	0	5	0	11	1	40	2
Videoton	2013–14	Nemzeti Bajnokság I	23	0	2	0	10	0	1	0	36	0
Videoton	2014–15	Nemzeti Bajnokság I	3	0			7	0	0	0	10	0
Videoton	Total		67	1	11	1	28	0	12	1	118	3
Career total			326	3	26	1	31	0	50	2	433	6

=== International ===
Appearances and goals by national team and year
National team	Year	Apps	Goals
Portugal	2002	2	0
Portugal	2003	2	0
Portugal	2004	1	0
Portugal	2005	7	0
Portugal	2006	6	0
Portugal	2007	5	0
Portugal	2008	2	0
Total		25	0

== Honours ==
Sporting CP

- Taça de Portugal: 2006–07
- Supertaça Cândido de Oliveira: 2008
- Taça da Liga runner-up: 2008–09

Beira-Mar

- Taça de Portugal: 1998–99

Valencia

- Copa del Rey: 2007–08
- UEFA Super Cup: 2004

Videoton

- Nemzeti Bajnokság I: 2014–15
- Szuperkupa: 2011, 2012
- Ligakupa: 2011–12

Portugal

- UEFA European Under-16 Championship: 1995

Orders

- Medal of Merit, Order of the Immaculate Conception of Vila Viçosa (House of Braganza)
