= Evandro Brandão =

Angolan footballer (born 1991)

Personal information
- Full name: Evandro Elmer de Carvalho Brandão
- Date of birth: 7 May 1991 (age 35)
- Place of birth: Luanda, Angola
- Height: 1.80 m (5 ft 11 in)
- Position: Forward

Youth career
- Blackburn Rovers
- 2003–2006: Walsall
- 2006–2009: Manchester United
- 2009: Braga
- 2009–2010: Benfica

Senior career*
Years	Team	Apps	(Gls)
2010–2011	Benfica	0	(0)
2010	→ Fátima (loan)	3	(0)
2011	→ Gondomar (loan)	12	(10)
2011–2013	Videoton	14	(1)
2012–2013	→ Olhanense (loan)	18	(1)
2013–2014	Tondela	17	(4)
2014–2015	Libolo	20	(2)
2015	Kabuscorp	8	(1)
2016	Benfica Castelo Branco	11	(1)
2016–2017	Fafe	36	(10)
2017–2019	Leixões	61	(11)
2019–2020	Maccabi Petah Tikva	22	(5)
2021	Vilafranquense	16	(4)
2022–2023	Alverca	40	(6)
2023–2024	RANS Nusantara	31	(6)
2024–2025	PSIS Semarang	8	(2)
Total		317	(64)

International career
2007	Portugal U16	8	(1)
2006–2008	Portugal U17	8	(0)
2009	Portugal U18	2	(0)
2010	Portugal U19	6	(0)
2014–2019	Angola	2	(1)
- * Club domestic league appearances and goals

Evandro Elmer de Carvalho Brandão (born 7 May 1991) is an Angolan former professional footballer who played as a forward.

== Club career ==
=== England ===
Brandão was born in Luanda, Angola, but spent the first years of his life in Portugal before moving to England at the age of 9. He began his football career at Blackburn Rovers, before joining Walsall in 2003.

After three years with Walsall, Brandão signed for Manchester United on 21 October 2006, after impressing assistant manager Carlos Queiroz while on trial at the 2006 Under-17 Nike Cup. He had to wait five months to make his debut for the under-18s, but played four of their last five games as the side finished fourth in the 2006–07 Premier Academy League, being offered a trainee contract in July 2007.

The following season, Brandão scored four goals in 18 appearances for the under-18 team, adding four in 15 matches the year after. He also made his debut for the reserves in 2008–09, coming on as a 69th-minute substitute for Magnus Wolff Eikrem in a Manchester Senior Cup game away to Bury. However, he was unable to make any more of an impression at the club, and was released in June 2009.

=== Benfica ===
Brandão joined Braga in summer 2009 but, five months later, left to sign a two-and-a-half-year contract with Benfica.

After spending a year in the Benfica academy, he went out on loan twice in 2010–11, first to Fátima (Segunda Liga) and then to Gondomar (third division), for whom he netted ten times in 12 games.

=== Hungary ===
After failing to break into the Benfica first team, Brandão moved to Hungarian club Videoton in July 2011, coached by his former Portugal under-16 manager Paulo Sousa. He scored his only Nemzeti Bajnokság I goal for the side on 20 August, contributing to a 4–1 home win against Pécs.

=== Later career ===
On 30 August 2012, Brandão signed with Olhanense in the Portuguese top flight, on loan. He scored his only goal in the competition on 15 December to help to a 2–2 home draw with Gil Vicente, as his team went on to finish as the first above the relegation zone.

Subsequently, Brandão represented in quick succession Tondela, Libolo, Kabuscorp – both from the Angolan Girabola– and Benfica e Castelo Branco, totalling only eight goals. On 12 July 2016, he agreed to a deal at Fafe from the Portuguese second tier.

Brandão scored his first hat-trick at the professional level on 15 January 2017, in a 4–1 victory over Braga B at the Estádio Municipal de Fafe. In June, following relegation, he signed for Leixões also of the second division.

On 10 September 2019, Brandão joined Israeli Liga Leumit club Maccabi Petah Tikva. He returned to Portugal and its division two in the 2021 January transfer window, on a one-and-a-half-year contract at Vilafranquense.

In January 2022, Brandão moved to the Liga 3 with Alverca. In the 2023 off-season, both he and his teammate Tavinho signed with RANS Nusantara in the Indonesian Liga 1.

Brandão joined PSIS Semarang of the same country and league in August 2024. On 26 March 2025, he decided to terminate his contract citing unpaid wages for more than four months.

== International career ==
At youth level, Brandão earned 24 caps for Portugal. He switched allegiance to Angola as a senior, making his debut on 13 August 2014 by playing the last four minutes of a 0–0 friendly draw against Botswana.

=== International goals ===
Scores and results list Angola's goal tally first, score column indicates score after each Brandão goal.

No.	Date	Venue	Opponent	Score	Result	Competition
1	8 June 2019	Estádio Municipal 25 de Abril, Penafiel, Portugal	Guinea-Bissau	1–0	2–0	Friendly

== Honours ==
Videoton

- Ligakupa: 2011–12
- Szuperkupa: 2011

Libolo

- Girabola: 2014, 2015

Maccabi Petah Tikva

- Liga Leumit: 2019–20
