= Ádám Gyurcsó =

Hungarian footballer

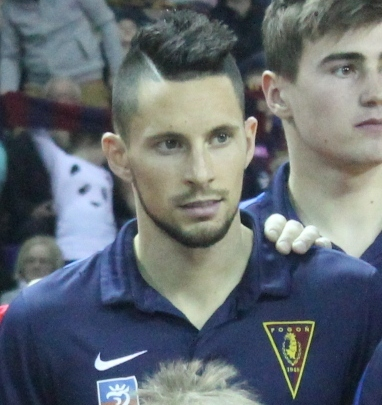

Personal information
- Date of birth: 6 March 1991 (age 35)
- Place of birth: Tatabánya, Hungary
- Height: 1.79 m (5 ft 10 1/2 in)
- Position: Winger

Team information
- Current team: Budapest Honvéd
- Number: 91

Youth career
- 2003–2008: Tatabánya

Senior career*
Years	Team	Apps	(Gls)
2008–2016	Videoton	102	(22)
2011	→ Kecskemét (loan)	16	(4)
2016–2018	Pogoń Szczecin	67	(9)
2018–2021	Hajduk Split	72	(15)
2019–2020	→ Puskás Akadémia (loan)	29	(7)
2021	Osijek	4	(1)
2021–2024	AEK Larnaca	72	(12)
2024–2025	Anorthosis Famagusta	22	(3)
2025–	Budapest Honvéd	22	(2)

International career
2011–2012	Hungary U21	2	(0)
2012–2020	Hungary	20	(3)
- * Club domestic league appearances and goals as of 31 May 2026

Ádám Gyurcsó (born 6 March 1991) is a Hungarian professional footballer who plays as a winger for Budapest Honvéd.

== Club career ==
=== Videoton ===
In the 2010–2011 season, he played for the second team of Videoton FC. With 10 goals and 14 assists, he was a key player in a great season. He made his first team debut on 15 March 2011 in a Magyar Kupa match against Budapest Honvéd FC and scored off the bench in a 4–0 win. He made his first team league debut for Videoton on 22 May 2011, coming off the bench in a 1–0 loss to Újpest FC.

In the following season, he was loaned to Kecskeméti TE. After six months on loan, scoring four goals and making four assist, Videoton FC brought him back to the club. He finished the season with six goals and ten assists in Hungarian top flight.

In the 2014–15 season, Gyurcsó scored 6 goals and made 18 assists as Videoton won the Hungarian league.

=== Pogoń Szczecin ===
On 5 January 2016, Gyurcsó was signed by Ekstraklasa club Pogoń Szczecin. He debuted in a 3–2 win against Korona Kielce at the Stadion Florian Krygier on 15 February 2016 in the 2015-16 Ekstraklasa season by scoring the winning goal in the 78th minute.

=== Hajduk Split ===
In January 2018, Gyurcsó joined Prva HNL side Hajduk Split on a six-month loan deal with an option to buy. He scored his first Hajduk goal in a 1–0 win over NK Rudeš on 3 March 2018. In May 2018, Hajduk activated a buy-out clause to sign the player on a permanent basis for the next 3 years.

==== Puskás Akadémia (loan) ====
On 10 August 2020, Gyurcsó moved to Hungarian side Puskás Akadémia, on a loan deal.

=== NK Osijek ===
On 15 February 2021, Gyurcsó terminated his contract with Hajduk Split, and signed as a free-agent with Prva HNL side NK Osijek.

=== Anorthosis Famagusta ===
On 5 September 2024, Gyurcsó signed with Anorthosis Famagusta.

== Club statistics ==
As of 29 August 2020

Appearances and goals by club, season and competition
Club	Season	League			Cup		League Cup		Europe		Total	
Club	Season	Division	Apps	Goals	Apps	Goals	Apps	Goals	Apps	Goals	Apps	Goals
Videoton	2008–09	Nemzeti Bajnokság I	0	0	3	2	3	0	—		6	2
Videoton	2009–10	Nemzeti Bajnokság I	0	0	1	2	4	0	—		5	2
Videoton	2010–11	Nemzeti Bajnokság I	1	0	2	1	0	0	—		3	1
Videoton	2011–12	Nemzeti Bajnokság I	13	2	4	0	5	1	—		22	3
Videoton	2012–13	Nemzeti Bajnokság I	26	4	5	0	3	0	11	0	45	4
Videoton	2013–14	Nemzeti Bajnokság I	19	3	2	0	7	3	2	1	30	7
Videoton	2014–15	Nemzeti Bajnokság I	26	6	5	1	1	0	—		32	7
Videoton	2015–16	Nemzeti Bajnokság I	17	7	2	0	—		6	2	25	9
Videoton	Total		102	22	24	6	23	4	19	3	168	35
Kecskemét (loan)	2011–12	Nemzeti Bajnokság I	16	4	4	0	2	0	2	0	24	4
Pogoń Szczecin	2015–16	Ekstraklasa	14	2	0	0	—		—		14	2
Pogoń Szczecin	2016–17	Ekstraklasa	35	5	6	1	—		—		41	6
Pogoń Szczecin	2017–18	Ekstraklasa	18	2	2	0	—		—		20	2
Pogoń Szczecin	Total		67	9	8	1	—		—		75	10
Hajduk Split	2017–18	Prva HNL	14	6	2	0	—		—		16	6
Hajduk Split	2018–19	Prva HNL	31	4	2	1	—		4	0	37	5
Hajduk Split	2019–20	Prva HNL	1	0	0	0	—		1	1	2	1
Hajduk Split	2020–21	Prva HNL	3	2	0	0	—		0	0	3	2
Hajduk Split	Total		49	12	4	1	—		5	1	58	14
Puskás Akadémia (loan)	2019–20	Nemzeti Bajnokság I	29	7	6	8	—		—		35	15
Career totals			263	54	46	16	25	4	26	4	360	78

== International career ==
On 1 June 2012, he made his international debut for Hungary as he came on as a substitute against Czech Republic in the 65th minute, where he scored the winning goal. Three days later he started in a match against Ireland.

On 10 October 2016 Gyurcsó scored his first goal in the 2018 FIFA World Cup qualification – UEFA Group B match against Latvia at the Skonto Stadium, Riga, Latvia.

== Career statistics ==
=== International goals ===
#	Date	Venue	Opponent	Score	Result	Competition
1.	1 June 2012	Generali Arena, Prague, Czech Republic	Czech Republic	2–1	2–1	Friendly
2.	10 October 2016	Skonto Stadium, Riga, Latvia	Latvia	1–0	2–0	2018 World Cup qualification
3.	13 November 2016	Groupama Arena, Budapest, Hungary	Andorra	3–0	4–0	2018 World Cup qualification
Correct as of 13 November 2016

== Honours ==
Videoton

- Nemzeti Bajnokság I: 2010–11, 2014–15
- Ligakupa: 2011–12
- Szuperkupa: 2012
