= Walter Fernández =

Spanish footballer

Walter
Personal information
- Full name: Walter Fernández Balufo
- Date of birth: 14 August 1989 (age 37)
- Place of birth: Caldes de Montbui, Spain
- Height: 1.84 m (6 ft 1/2 in)
- Position: Attacking midfielder

Team information
- Current team: Manresa

Youth career
- Espanyol
- Barcelona

Senior career*
Years	Team	Apps	(Gls)
2008–2009	Barcelona B	0	(0)
2008–2009	→ Mahonés (loan)		
2009	→ Antequera (loan)	10	(1)
2009–2012	Gimnàstic	44	(0)
2011–2012	→ Videoton (loan)	33	(1)
2013–2014	Lokeren	11	(1)
2013–2014	→ Petrolul Ploiești (loan)	21	(0)
2015	Skoda Xanthi	14	(0)
2015–2016	Panthrakikos	12	(0)
2016	Hospitalet	13	(0)
2017	Extremadura	10	(1)
2018–2019	Sant Julià		
2019–	Manresa	3	(0)
- * Club domestic league appearances and goals as of 11 September 2019

Walter Fernández Balufo (born 14 August 1989), known simply as Walter, is a Spanish professional footballer who plays for CE Manresa mainly as an attacking midfielder.

== Football career ==
Born in Caldes de Montbui, Barcelona, Catalonia, Walter finished his formation at FC Barcelona. He started his senior career in the lower leagues, being successively loaned to CF Sporting Mahonés and Antequera CF.

For 2009–10, Walter signed for four years with Segunda División club Gimnàstic de Tarragona, making his professional debut on 30 August 2009 by starting in a 1–0 away win against Real Murcia and finishing the season with 34 matches (21 starts). In late June 2011, however, both parties agreed to cancel his contract, and he was loaned to Hungarian side Videoton FC for two years.

Walter played his first match in top flight football on 24 July 2011, featuring the full 90 minutes in a 4–0 home success over Paksi SE. He had first appeared in the UEFA Europa League 11 days earlier, coming on as a second-half substitute in a 0–2 loss at SK Sturm Graz.

In the following years, Walter failed to settle with a team, representing K.S.C. Lokeren Oost-Vlaanderen, FC Petrolul Ploiești, Skoda Xanthi and Panthrakikos.

== Honours ==
Videoton

- Ligakupa: 2011–12
- Szuperkupa: 2011, 2012
