= Héctor Sánchez (footballer, born 1985) =

Spanish footballer

Personal information
- Full name: Héctor Sánchez Cabrera
- Date of birth: 31 March 1985 (age 41)
- Place of birth: Fuerteventura, Spain
- Height: 1.75 m (5 ft 9 in)
- Position: Left-back

Youth career
- 2002–2003: Herbania

Senior career*
Years	Team	Apps	(Gls)
2003–2005	Tenerife B	4	(1)
2005–2010	Tenerife	70	(0)
2010–2011	Villarreal B	9	(0)
2011–2013	Videoton	29	(0)
2015–2016	La Roda	22	(0)
2016–2017	Palencia	21	(0)
2017–2018	Amorebieta	14	(0)
2018–2021	Unión Puerto	74	(4)
2021–2022	Gran Tarajal	25	(1)
Total		268	(6)
- * Club domestic league appearances and goals

Héctor Sánchez Cabrera (born 31 March 1985) is a Spanish former professional footballer who played as a left-back.

== Club career ==
Sánchez was born in Fuerteventura, Canary Islands. A product of CD Tenerife's youth system, he made his first-team debut in 2004–05 in the Segunda División, then made a further 57 league appearances over the next four seasons, including 19 in 2008–09 to help the club return to La Liga after seven years (21 in all competitions).

In the following campaign, Sánchez made his top-flight debut when he played seven minutes in a 2–1 home win against Sporting de Gijón on 6 December 2009, but featured sparingly overall – seven of his 11 matches came in the last rounds – as his team was immediately relegated.

On 19 June 2011, Sánchez signed for Videoton FC in Hungary. Having returned to his country after nearly two years of inactivity, he resumed his career in the lower leagues, retiring in August 2023 aged 38.

== Career statistics ==
As of 14 April 2013

Club	Season	League		Cup		League Cup		Europe		Total	
Club	Season	Apps	Goals	Apps	Goals	Apps	Goals	Apps	Goals	Apps	Goals
Tenerife	2007–08	6	0	2	0	0	0	0	0	8	0
Tenerife	2008–09	19	0	2	0	0	0	0	0	21	0
Tenerife	2009–10	11	0	0	0	0	0	0	0	11	0
Tenerife	Total	36	0	4	0	0	0	0	0	40	0
Villarreal B	2010–11	9	0	0	0	0	0	0	0	9	0
Villarreal B	Total	9	0	0	0	0	0	0	0	9	0
Videoton	2011–12	14	0	5	0	8	0	2	0	29	0
Videoton	2012–13	15	0	1	0	3	0	0	0	19	0
Videoton	Total	29	0	6	0	11	0	2	0	48	0
Career totals		74	0	10	0	11	0	2	0	97	0
