= 2010–11 Budapest Honvéd FC season =

Budapest Honvéd FC
2010–11 season
- Chairman: George Hemingway
- Manager: Massimo Morales (until 13 November 2010); Attila Supka
- NB 1: 10th
- Hungarian Cup: Quarter-final
- Hungarian League Cup: Group Stage
- Top goalscorer: League: Danilo (5 goal); All: Danilo (8 goal)
- Highest home attendance: 3,500 (16 October vs Kecskeméti TE)
- Lowest home attendance: 500 (10 September vs Zalaegerszegi TE)

The 2010–11 season will be Budapest Honvéd FC's 100th competitive season, 6th consecutive season in the Soproni Liga and 101st year in existence as a football club.

== Team kit and logo ==
The team kits for the 2010–11 season are produced by Nike. The home kit is red and black colour and the away kit is white, red and black colour.

Home	Away

== Squad ==
=== First team squad ===
Note: Flags indicate national team as defined under FIFA eligibility rules; some limited exceptions apply. Players may hold more than one non-FIFA nationality.

No.	Pos.	Nation	Player
1	GK	HUN	Iván Tóth
2	DF	ROU	Sergiu Ionut Moga
3	DF	CMR	Sadjo Haman
4	DF	HUN	György Cséke
4	DF	CIV	Jean-Baptiste Akassou
5	DF	HUN	András Debreceni
6	DF	ROU	Sorin Botis
8	MF	HUN	Norbert Hajdú
9	MF	HUN	Bálint Bajner
9	FW	HUN	László Erdélyi
11	FW	ESP	Rufino
13	FW	BIH	Jovica Stokić
13	MF	HUN	Valér Kapacina
14	FW	HUN	László Bojtor
15	FW	NZL	Kris Bright
17	MF	SEN	Dieng Cheikh Abass
17	MF	SVK	Peter Fieber
18	MF	ESP	Pablo Coira
19	FW	BRA	Danilo

No.	Pos.	Nation	Player
20	DF	ESP	Fernando Cuerda
20	MF	HUN	Gellért Ivancsics
21	FW	SLE	Alfi Conteh-Lacalle
23	FW	MAR	Karim Rouani
24	MF	HUN	Adrián Horváth
25	MF	CRO	Ivan Lovrić
26	MF	HUN	Patrik Hidi
27	FW	BRA	Moreira
28	DF	HUN	Márkó Sós
28	MF	HUN	Bálint Vécsei
29	DF	HUN	Ákos Takács
29	DF	CRO	Tomislav Labudović
30	MF	CZE	Lukáš Zelenka
32	MF	HUN	Richárd Czár
33	GK	HUN	Gábor Németh
34	MF	HUN	Richárd Vernes
71	GK	HUN	Szabolcs Kemenes
77	MF	HUN	Gergő Nagy

=== League Cup squad ===
Note: Flags indicate national team as defined under FIFA eligibility rules; some limited exceptions apply. Players may hold more than one non-FIFA nationality.

No.	Pos.	Nation	Player
3	DF	ROU	Sebastian Remeş
4	DF	HUN	György Cséke
5	DF	HUN	András Debreceni
7	FW	HUN	Roland Vólent
9	FW	HUN	Bálint Bajner
21	FW	SLE	Alfi Conteh-Lacalle
22	DF	HUN	Márkó Sós
22	MF	HUN	Gergő Nagy
23	MF	HUN	Márk Farkas
24	MF	HUN	Adrián Horváth

No.	Pos.	Nation	Player
26	MF	HUN	Patrik Hidi
30	FW	GAM	Jammeh Haruna
32	MF	HUN	Richárd Czár
34	MF	HUN	Richárd Vernes
36	DF	HUN	Botond Baráth
71	MF	HUN	Armand Nagy
79	MF	BRA	Dyjan Carlos De Azevedo
85	FW	HUN	László Bojtor
90	GK	HUN	Roland Kunsági

== Club ==
=== Coaching staff ===
Position	Staff
Manager	(Italy) Massimo Morales
Assistant managers	(Hungary) József Csábi
First team fitness coach	(Hungary) István Kasper
Goalkeeping coach	(Hungary) István Brockhauser
Head scout	(Hungary) Róbert Pandur
Club doctor	(Hungary) Dr. Gergely Pánics
Club doctor	(Hungary) Dr. József Toman
Masseur	(Hungary) Buda Lajtaváry
Masseur	(Hungary) István Kiss
Reserve team manager	(Hungary) Krisztián Gabala

Last updated: 4 August 2010

=== Other information ===
General Manager	(Hungary) Pál Gácsi
Lawyer	(Hungary) Dr. József Lóránth
Marketing Director	(Hungary) Zoltán Kollek
Technical Leader	(Hungary) Gábor Simon
Security Chief	(Hungary) Csaba Tóth
Media Responsible	(Hungary) Kálmán Kaszás
Hungarian Futball Academy Headmaster	(Hungary) László Szalai
Communicational Headmaster	(Hungary) Zoltán Simon
General Editor	(Hungary) Dénes Éless
Establishment Headmaster	(Hungary) Judit Kuskó Vargáné
Hospitality Leader	(Hungary) Sándor Hólé
Ground (capacity and dimensions)	Bozsik József Stadion (16,000 / 105x68 meters)

Updated to match played 4 August 2010

== Transfers ==
=== Summer ===
In: Note: Flags indicate national team as defined under FIFA eligibility rules; some limited exceptions apply. Players may hold more than one non-FIFA nationality.

No.	Pos.	Nation	Player
3	DF	CMR	Sadjo Haman (from (Hungary) Diósgyőri VTK)
9	FW	HUN	Bálint Bajner (from (Romania) CF Liberty)
11	FW	ESP	Rufino del Burgo (from (Spain) CD Toledo)
13	MF	BIH	Jovica Stokić (from (Bosnia and Herzegovina) FK Modriča)
19	FW	BRA	Danilo de Oliveira (from (Slovakia) FC Spartak Trnava)
21	FW	SLE	Alfi Conteh-Lacalle (from (Hungary) Nyíregyháza)
23	FW	MAR	Karim Rouani (from (Portugal) GD Chaves)
—	FW	ITA	Andre Luiz (from (Malta) Nadur Youngsters)

Out: Note: Flags indicate national team as defined under FIFA eligibility rules; some limited exceptions apply. Players may hold more than one non-FIFA nationality.

No.	Pos.	Nation	Player
3	FW	HUN	Norbert Palásthy (to (Hungary) Paksi SE)
5	DF	UKR	Pavlo Yanchuk (loan return to (Romania) CF Liberty)
9	MF	SVK	Viliam Macko (to (Slovakia) Tatran Prešov)
11	FW	HUN	Róbert Zsolnai (on loan to (Hungary) Kaposvár)
13	DF	HUN	Zoltán Nagy (loan return to (Hungary) Debreceni VSC)
18	FW	CIV	Guie Abraham (to (France) Tours FC)
19	MF	BRA	Diego (to (France) Tours FC)
21	DF	HUN	Gergő Gohér (loan return to (Hungary) Diósgyőri VTK)
23	FW	ITA	Angelo Vaccaro (to (Italy) Sorrento Calcio)
55	MF	SRB	Dragan Vukmir (to (Hungary) MTK Budapest FC)

=== Winter ===
In: Note: Flags indicate national team as defined under FIFA eligibility rules; some limited exceptions apply. Players may hold more than one non-FIFA nationality.

No.	Pos.	Nation	Player
14	FW	NZL	Kris Bright (from (England) Shrewsbury Town F.C.)
17	MF	SVK	Peter Fieber (from (Slovakia) FC Petržalka 1898)
20	MF	HUN	Gellért Ivancsics (on loan from (Hungary) Zalaegerszegi TE)
21	FW	HUN	Zoltán Hercegfalvi (loan return from (United States) Sporting Kansas City)
25	DF	CRO	Ivan Lovrić (from Singapore Armed Forces FC)
30	MF	CZE	Lukáš Zelenka (from (Czech Republic) 1. FC Slovácko)
—	MF	HUN	Bálint Sásdi (from (Hungary) Büki TK)

Out: Note: Flags indicate national team as defined under FIFA eligibility rules; some limited exceptions apply. Players may hold more than one non-FIFA nationality.

No.	Pos.	Nation	Player
4	DF	HUN	György Cséke (to (Hungary) Nyíregyháza Spartacus)
11	FW	HUN	Róbert Zsolnai (to (Hungary) Szolnoki MÁV FC)
13	MF	BIH	Jovica Stokić (to (Bosnia and Herzegovina) NK Zvijezda Gradačac)
17	MF	SEN	Dieng Cheikh Abass (on loan to (France) Nîmes Olympique)
18	DF	ESP	Pablo Coira (to unemployed)
20	DF	ESP	Fernando Cuerda (to unemployed)
21	FW	SLE	Alfi Conteh-Lacalle (to unemployed)
22	DF	FRA	Gary Tavars (to unemployed)
29	DF	HUN	Ákos Takács (to (Hungary) Győri ETO FC)
33	GK	HUN	Gábor Németh (to (Hungary) Vasas SC)
85	FW	HUN	László Bojtor (to (Hungary) Vecsési FC)

List of Hungarian football transfer summer 2010

== Pre-season ==
3 July 2010

Budapest Honvéd FC (Hungary)	3–1	(Romania) FC Victoria Brăneşti
Conteh 36'; Hajdú 49' (pen.); Abass 70'	(Report)	57'

Bozsik József Stadion, Budapest
Attendance: 100

7 July 2010

Budapest Honvéd FC (Hungary)	2–1	(Romania) CS Gaz Metan Mediaş
Hajdú 25' (pen.); Sadjo 80' (pen.)	(Report)	56'

Bozsik József Stadion, Budapest

10 July 2010

Budapest Honvéd FC (Hungary)	3–0	(Slovakia) DAC Dunajská Streda
Hajdú 42'; Stokić 77'; Tchami 84'	(Report)

Bozsik József Stadion, Budapest
Attendance: 200
Referee: Landeszmann

14 July 2010

Budapest Honvéd FC (Hungary)	11–1	(Hungary) Vecsési FC
Bojtor 7' 13' 41'; Bajner 36'; Haruna 46' 49' 85'; Vólent 55' 61' 65'; Czár 80'	(Report)	29'

Bozsik József Stadion, Budapest
Attendance: 300

15 July 2010

Budapest Honvéd FC (Hungary)	1–3	(Greece) Panionios
Stokić 86'	(Report)	Osei 19'; Kukec 55'; Skuritis 88'

Bozsik József Stadion, Budapest
Attendance: 500
Referee: Gyula Kömpf

19 July 2010

Budapest Honvéd FC (Hungary)	4–0	(Hungary) BKV Előre SC
Conteh 34'; 71' (o.g.); Hajdú 74' (pen.); Danilo 80'	(Report)

Bozsik József Stadion, Budapest
Attendance: 300
Referee: János Csák

23 July 2010

Budapest Honvéd FC (Hungary)	2–1	(Israel) Hapoel Petah Tikva
Hajdú 86'; Rufino 89'	(Report)	Odah 7'

Bozsik József Stadion, Budapest
Attendance: 200
Referee: Gyula Kömpf

== Statistics ==
=== Appearances and goals ===
Last updated on 22 May 2011.

No.	Pos	Nat	Player	Total		NB 1		Hungarian Cup		League Cup	
No.	Pos	Nat	Player	Apps	Goals	Apps	Goals	Apps	Goals	Apps	Goals
1	GK	(Hungary) HUN	Iván Tóth	6	-6	2	-4	4	-2	0	0
2	DF	(Romania) ROU	Sergiu Ionut Moga	1	0	1	0	0	0	0	0
3	DF	(Cameroon) CMR	Sadjo Haman	25	1	20	1	5	0	0	0
3	DF	(Romania) ROU	Remes Sebastian Bogdan	1	0	0	0	0	0	1	0
4	DF	(Hungary) HUN	György Cséke	7	2	1	0	2	2	4	0
4	DF	(Ivory Coast) CIV	Jean-Baptiste Akassou	29	2	24	1	4	1	1	0
5	DF	(Hungary) HUN	András Debreceni	33	2	24	1	6	1	3	0
6	DF	(Romania) ROU	Sorin Botis	31	1	27	1	4	0	0	0
7	FW	(Hungary) HUN	Roland Vólent	12	1	7	0	2	0	3	1
8	MF	(Hungary) HUN	Norbert Hajdú	36	3	29	3	5	0	2	0
9	FW	(Hungary) HUN	Bálint Bajner	9	2	6	1	1	1	2	0
9	FW	(Hungary) HUN	László Erdélyi	1	0	1	0	0	0	0	0
11	FW	(Spain) ESP	Rufino Segovia del Burgo	20	7	14	2	4	2	2	3
13	FW	(Bosnia and Herzegovina) BIH	Jovica Stokić	2	1	1	0	1	1	0	0
13	DF	(Hungary) HUN	Kálmán Tisza	1	0	0	0	0	0	1	0
13	MF	(Hungary) HUN	Valér Kapacina	1	0	1	0	0	0	0	0
14	FW	(Hungary) HUN	László Bojtor	16	1	9	1	3	0	4	0
15	FW	(New Zealand) NZL	Kris Bright	11	1	9	1	2	0	0	0
17	MF	(Senegal) SEN	Dieng Cheikh Abass	18	4	16	4	1	0	1	0
17	MF	(Slovakia) SVK	Peter Fieber	2	0	1	0	1	0	0	0
18	MF	(Spain) ESP	Pablo Coira	16	2	13	2	3	0	0	0
19	FW	(Brazil) BRA	Danilo Cirino de Oliveira	28	8	24	5	4	3	0	0
20	DF	(Spain) ESP	Fernando Cuerda	8	0	7	0	1	0	0	0
20	MF	(Hungary) HUN	Gellért Ivancsics	15	2	14	2	1	0	0	0
21	FW	(Sierra Leone) SLE	Alfi Conteh-Lacalle	10	1	7	0	2	1	1	0
23	FW	(Morocco) MAR	Karim Rouani	21	5	17	2	3	3	1	0
23	MF	(Hungary) HUN	Márk Farkas	1	0	0	0	0	0	1	0
24	MF	(Hungary) HUN	Adrián Horváth	27	0	17	0	6	0	4	0
25	MF	(Hungary) HUN	Péter Varga	2	0	0	0	0	0	2	0
25	DF	(Croatia) CRO	Ivan Lovrić	15	4	13	4	2	0	0	0
26	MF	(Hungary) HUN	Patrik Hidi	19	0	13	0	2	0	4	0
27	FW	(Brazil) BRA	Guilherme Rodrigues Moreira	23	0	19	0	3	0	1	0
28	DF	(Hungary) HUN	Márkó Sós	8	0	1	0	3	0	4	0
28	MF	(Hungary) HUN	Bálint Vécsei	3	0	3	0	0	0	0	0
29	DF	(Hungary) HUN	Ákos Takács	16	1	15	1	0	0	1	0
29	DF	(Croatia) CRO	Tomislav Labudović	1	0	1	0	0	0	0	0
30	FW	(The Gambia) GAM	Jammeh Haruna	2	2	0	0	0	0	2	2
30	MF	(Czech Republic) CZE	Lukáš Zelenka	13	3	12	2	1	1	0	0
32	MF	(Hungary) HUN	Richárd Czár	5	1	2	1	1	0	2	0
33	GK	(Hungary) HUN	Gábor Németh	1	-3	1	-3	0	0	0	0
34	MF	(Hungary) HUN	Richárd Vernes	2	0	1	0	0	0	1	0
36	DF	(Hungary) HUN	Botond Baráth	4	0	0	0	1	0	3	0
71	GK	(Hungary) HUN	Szabolcs Kemenes	30	-39	27	-32	2	-5	1	-2
71	MF	(Hungary) HUN	Armand Nagy	2	0	0	0	0	0	2	0
77	MF	(Hungary) HUN	Gergő Nagy	16	1	13	0	1	0	2	1
79	MF	(Brazil) BRA	Dyjan Carlos De Azevedo	3	0	0	0	1	0	2	0
90	GK	(Hungary) HUN	Roland Kunsági	3	-9	0	0	0	0	3	-9

=== Top scorers ===
Includes all competitive matches. The list is sorted by shirt number when total goals are equal.

Last updated on 12 May 2011

Position	Nation	Number	Name	Soproni Liga	Hungarian Cup	League Cup	Total
1	(Brazil)	19	Danilo	5	3	0	8
2	(Spain)	11	Rufino	2	2	3	7
3	(Morocco)	23	Karim Rouani	2	3	0	5
4	(Senegal)	16	Dieng Abass	4	0	0	4
5	(Croatia)	25	Ivan Lovrić	4	0	0	4
6	(Hungary)	8	Norbert Hajdú	3	0	0	3
7	(Czech Republic)	30	Lukáš Zelenka	2	1	0	3
8	(Spain)	18	Pablo Coira	2	0	0	2
9	(Hungary)	20	Gellért Ivancsics	2	0	0	2
10	(Hungary)	9	Bálint Bajner	1	1	0	2
11	(Hungary)	5	András Debreceni	1	1	0	2
12	(Ivory Coast)	15	Jean-Baptiste Akassou	1	1	0	2
13	(Hungary)	4	György Cséke	0	2	0	2
14	(The Gambia)	30	Jammeh Haruna	0	0	2	2
15	(Hungary)	29	Ákos Takács	1	0	0	1
16	(Romania)	6	Sorin Botis	1	0	0	1
17	(Cameroon)	3	Sadjo Haman	1	0	0	1
18	(Hungary)	14	László Bojtor	1	0	0	1
19	(New Zealand)	15	Kris Bright	1	0	0	1
20	(Hungary)	32	Richárd Czár	1	0	0	1
21	(Sierra Leone)	21	Alfi Conteh-Lacalle	0	1	0	1
22	(Bosnia and Herzegovina)	13	Jovica Stokić	0	1	0	1
23	(Hungary)	7	Roland Vólent	0	0	1	1
24	(Hungary)	77	Gergő Nagy	0	0	1	1
/	/	/	Own Goals	1	0	0	1
			TOTALS	36	16	7	59

=== Disciplinary record ===
Includes all competitive matches. Players with 1 card or more included only.

Last updated on 22 May 2011

Position	Nation	Number	Name	Soproni Liga		Hungarian Cup		League Cup		Total (Hu Total)	
Position	Nation	Number	Name	Yellow card	Red card	Yellow card	Red card	Yellow card	Red card	Yellow card	Red card
DF	(Cameroon)	3	Sadjo Haman	5	0	1	0	0	0	6 (5)	0 (0)
DF	(Hungary)	4	György Cséke	0	0	0	0	2	0	2 (0)	0 (0)
DF	(Hungary)	5	András Debreceni	2	1	0	0	0	0	2 (2)	1 (1)
DF	(Romania)	6	Sorin Botis	5	0	0	0	0	0	5 (5)	0 (0)
FW	(Hungary)	7	Roland Vólent	1	0	1	0	0	0	2 (1)	0 (0)
MF	(Hungary)	8	Norbert Hajdú	3	1	2	0	1	0	6 (3)	1 (1)
FW	(Spain)	11	Rufino	2	0	0	0	0	0	2 (2)	0 (0)
DF	(Ivory Coast)	15	Baptiste Akassou	5	1	1	0	0	0	6 (5)	1 (1)
MF	(Senegal)	17	Dieng Abass	1	0	0	0	0	0	1 (1)	0 (0)
MF	(Slovakia)	17	Peter Fieber	1	0	0	0	0	0	1 (1)	0 (0)
MF	(Spain)	18	Pablo Coira	2	0	0	0	0	0	2 (2)	0 (0)
FW	(Brazil)	19	Danilo	5	0	0	0	0	0	5 (5)	0 (0)
MF	(Spain)	20	Fernando Cuerda	2	2	0	1	0	0	2 (2)	3 (2)
MF	(Hungary)	20	Gellért Ivancsics	1	0	1	0	0	0	2 (1)	0 (0)
FW	(Sierra Leone)	21	Alfi Conteh-Lacalle	1	0	0	0	0	0	1 (1)	0 (0)
FW	(Morocco)	23	Karim Rouani	0	0	1	0	0	0	1 (0)	0 (0)
MF	(Hungary)	24	Adrián Horváth	4	0	0	0	1	0	5 (4)	0 (0)
DF	(Croatia)	25	Ivan Lovrić	4	0	1	0	0	0	5 (4)	0 (0)
MF	(Hungary)	26	Patrik Hidi	1	0	0	0	0	0	1 (1)	0 (0)
FW	(Brazil)	27	Moreira	3	0	1	0	0	0	4 (3)	0 (0)
DF	(Hungary)	29	Ákos Takács	2	0	0	0	0	0	2 (2)	0 (0)
MF	(Czech Republic)	30	Lukáš Zelenka	4	0	1	0	0	0	5 (4)	0 (0)
MF	(Hungary)	34	Richárd Vernes	1	0	0	0	0	0	1 (1)	0 (0)
GK	(Hungary)	71	Szabolcs Kemenes	1	0	0	0	0	0	1 (1)	0 (0)
MF	(Hungary)	77	Gergő Nagy	1	0	0	0	0	0	1 (1)	0 (0)
FW	(Hungary)	85	László Bojtor	0	0	1	0	0	0	1 (0)	0 (0)
			TOTALS	57	5	11	1	4	0	72 (57)	6 (5)

=== Overall ===
Games played	40 (30 Soproni Liga, 6 Hungarian Cup and 4 Hungarian League Cup)
Games won	16 (11 Soproni Liga, 4 Hungarian Cup and 1 Hungarian League Cup)
Games drawn	8 (7 Soproni Liga, 1 Hungarian Cup and 0 Hungarian League Cup)
Games lost	16 (12 Soproni Liga, 1 Hungarian Cup and 3 Hungarian League Cup)
Goals scored	59
Goals conceded	57
Goal difference	+2
Yellow cards	72
Red cards	6
Worst discipline	(Spain) Fernando Cuerda (2 (yellow card) , 3 (red card) )
Worst discipline	(Ivory Coast) Jean-Baptiste Akassou (6 (yellow card) , 1 (red card) )
Worst discipline	(Hungary) Norbert Hajdú (6 (yellow card) , 1 (red card) )
Best result	7–0 (H) v Eger FC – Hungarian Cup – 23 November 2010
Worst result	0–4 (A) v Videoton FC Fehérvár – Hungarian Cup – 15 March 2011
Most appearances	(Hungary) Norbert Hajdú (36 appearances)
Top scorer	(Brazil) Danilo Cirino de Oliveira (8 goals)
Points	56/120 (46.67%)

Last updated: 22 May 2011

== Nemzeti Bajnokság I ==
=== Classification ===
Pos	Team	Pld	W	D	L	GF	GA	GD	Pts	Qualification or relegation
8	Haladás	30	11	8	11	42	36	+6	41	
9	Győr	30	10	11	9	40	35	+5	41	
10	Honvéd	30	11	7	12	36	39	−3	40	
11	Vasas	30	11	7	12	34	46	−12	40	
12	Kecskemét	30	11	3	16	51	56	−5	36	Qualification for Europa League second qualifying round (Note: Kecskemét have qualified for the second qualifying round of the 2011–12 UEFA Europa League after winning the 2010–11 Hungarian Cup.)

Source: soccerway.com
Rules for classification: 1st points; 2nd overall wins; 3rd goal difference; 4th goals scored

=== Results summary ===
Overall								Home						Away					
Pld	W	D	L	GF	GA	GD	Pts	W	D	L	GF	GA	GD	W	D	L	GF	GA	GD
30	11	7	12	36	39	−3	40	5	4	6	15	18	−3	6	3	6	21	21	0

Last updated: 22 May 2011.
Source: NB1

=== Results by round ===
Round	1	2	3	4	5	6	7	8	9	10	11	12	13	14	15	16	17	18	19	20	21	22	23	24	25	26	27	28	29	30
Ground	A	H	A	H	A	H	A	H	A	H	A	A	H	A	H	H	A	H	A	H	A	H	A	H	A	H	H	A	H	A
Result	L	L	W	W	W	W	D	L	W	L	D	W	D	L	L	D	L	L	D	D	L	W	W	W	L	W	D	L	L	W
Position	12	15	11	7	6	2	4	5	3	5	7	7	7	8	8	8	10	11	13	12	13	12	10	7	11	9	8	11	11	10

Updated to match(es) played on 22 May 2011. Source: Matches
A = Away; H = Home; W = Win; D = Draw; L = Loss

=== Matches ===
31 July 2010
20:00 CEST

Vasas SC	3 – 2 (2–1)	Budapest Honvéd FC
Gáspár 9' 76'; Arnaut 36'; Pavičević (yellow card) 64'	(Report)	Akassou (yellow card) 12'; Abass 16'; Conteh (yellow card) 59'; Botis (yellow card) 79'; Á. Takács 83'; Sadjo (yellow card) 86'

Stadion Rudolf Illovszky, Budapest
Attendance: 1,500
Referee: Ádám Farkas
- Vasas SC: Végh – Zs. Balog, Arnaut, Gáspár, M. Katona (Mileusnic 30.) – Benounes (Mundi 70.), Pavicevic, Bakos – Hrepka (Phanktkhava 83.), Ferenczi, Lázok. Coach: Giovanni Dellacasa.
- Budapest Honvéd FC: G. Németh – Á. Takács, Cuerda, Botis, Hajdú – Abass, Coira, Akassou, Conteh (Sadjo 62.), Rouani (Rufino 68.) – Bajner (Stokic 46.). Coach: Massimo Morales.
- G.: Gáspár (9., 76.), Arnaut (36.) – Abass (16.), Á. Takács (83.)
- Y.: C. Pavicevic (64.) – Akassou (12.), Conteh (59.), Botis (79.), Sadjo (86.)

7 August 2010
17:30 CEST

Budapest Honvéd FC	1 – 2 (0–1)	MTK Budapest FC
Debreceni (red card) 9'; Cuerda (yellow card) 31' (yellow-red card) 55'; Botis 62' (yellow card) 89'	(Report)	J. Kanta 10' (pen.); Vukadinović (yellow card) 20'; Pátkai (yellow card) 27'; A. Gál (yellow card) 41'; Tischler 74'; A. Pál (yellow card) 92'

Bozsik József Stadion, Budapest
Attendance: 800
Referee: Zoltán Iványi
- Budapest Honvéd FC: Kemenes – Á. Takács, Debreceni, Cuerda, Sadjo – Abass, Akassou, Danilo (Conteh 82.), Moreira (Botis 55.), Hajdú – Rufino (Rouani 68.). Coach: Massimo Morales.
- MTK Budapest FC: Szatmári – Vukadinovic, Sütő, Á. Pintér, A. Gál (Eppel 67.) – Vadnai, Pátkai, J. Kanta (Ladányi 75.) – Á. Szabó (Skriba 79.), Tischler, A. Pál. Coach: József Garami.
- G.: Botis (62.) – J. Kanta (10. – pen.), Tischler (74.)
- Y.: Cuerda (31.), Botis (89.) – Vukadinovic (20.), Pátkai (27.), A. Gál (41.), A. Pál (92.)
- R.: Debreceni (9.), Cuerda (55.)

15 August 2010
17:30 CEST

Ferencvárosi TC	1 – 3 (0–3)	Budapest Honvéd FC
Junior (yellow card) 12'; Stanić (red card) 40'; Csizmadia (yellow card) 43'; Kulcsár 51'; Heinz (yellow card) 78'	(Report)	Rufino 8'; Hajdú 13' (pen.); Haman (yellow card) 23'; Rouani 33'

Stadion Albert Flórián, Budapest
Attendance: 4,000
Referee: Roland Veizer
- Ferencvárosi TC: Ranilović – Balog (Rodenbücher 59.), Csizmadia, Tutoric, Junior (Kulcsár 25.) – Maróti (Abdi 68.), Józsi, Stanic, Andrezinho – Rósa, Heinz. Coach: László Prukner.
- Budapest Honvéd FC: Kemenes – Takács, Cséke, Botis, Hajdú – Coira, Akassou, Danilo (Bajner 76.), Sadjo (Conteh 70.) – Rouani (Abass 67.), Rufino. Coach: Massimo Morales.
- G.: Kulcsár (51.) – Rufino (8.), Hajdú (13. – pen.), Rouani (33.)
- Y.: Junior (12.), Csizmadia (43.), Heinz (79.) – Sadjo (23.)
- R.: Stanic (40.)

22 August 2010
17:30 CEST

Budapest Honvéd FC	1 – 0 (1–0)	Debreceni VSC
Coira 22'; Akassou (yellow card) 25'; Rufino (yellow card) 77'	(Report)	Fodor (yellow card) 37'; Spitzmüller (yellow card) 85'

Bozsik József Stadion, Budapest
Attendance: 1,200
Referee: Zsolt Szabó
- Budapest Honvéd FC: Kemenes – Takács, Botis, Cuerda, Hajdú – Danilo (Bojtor 88.), Coira, Rufino, Akassou, Sadjo – Rouani (Abass 85.). Coach: Massimo Morales.
- Debreceni VSC: Malinauskas – Nagy, Simac, Szűcs, Fodor – Kulcsár (Ramos 46.), Spitzmüller, Bódi, Rezes – Farkas (Coulibaly 46.), Szilágyi (Balajti 63.). Coach: András Herczeg.
- G.: Coira (22.)
- Y.: Akassou (25.), Rufino (77.) – Fodor (37.), Spitzmüller (85.)

28 August 2010
17:30 CEST

Szolnoki MÁV FC	0 – 2 (0–1)	Budapest Honvéd FC
Pető (yellow card) 36'; Schindler (yellow card) 63'; Hevesi-Tóth (yellow card) 74'	(Report)	Haman 21'; Rufino (yellow card) 41' (goal) 88'; Cuerda (yellow card) 46'; Danilo (yellow card) 77'

Tiszaligeti Stadion, Szolnok
Attendance: 3,000
Referee: Tamás Bognár
- Szolnoki MÁV FC: Kövesfalvi – Schindler, Hegedűs (Koós 22.), Pető, Balogh – Remili, Búrány, Pisanjuk (Lengyel 57.), Hevesi-Tóth, Tchami (Antal 65.) – Alex. Coach: Attila Vágó.
- Budapest Honvéd FC: Kemenes – Botis, Takács, Cuerda, Hajdú – Danilo (Conteh 75.), Coira, Akassou, Sadjo – Rufino, Rouani (Abass 73.). Coach: Massimo Morales.
- G.: Sadjo (21.), Rufino (88.)
- Y.: Pető (36.), Schindler (63.), Hevesi-Tóth (74.) – Rufino (41.), Cuerda (46.), Danilo (77.)

10 September 2010
15:00 CEST

Budapest Honvéd FC	1 – 0 (1–0)	Zalaegerszegi TE
Abass 22'; Kemenes (yellow card) 32'; Takács (yellow card) 57'; Danilo (yellow card) 83'	(Report)	Rajcomar (yellow card) 19'; Pavičević (yellow card) 32'; Szalai (red card) 38'; Horváth (yellow card) 81'; Bogunović (yellow card) 83'; Máté (yellow card) 90'; Illés (yellow card) 90'

Bozsik József Stadion, Budapest
Attendance: 500
Referee: István Vad
- Budapest Honvéd FC: Kemenes – Takács, Cuerda, Botis, Hajdú – Abass, Coira, Akassou, Sadjo – Danilo, Rouani (Rufino 77.). Coach: Massimo Morales.
- Zalaegerszegi TE: Vlaszák – Kovács (Simon 54.), Bogunovic, Miljatovic, Panikavar (Balázs 74.) – Szalai, Máté, Kamber, Illés – Rajcomar (Horváth 43.), Pavicevic. Coach: János Csank.
- G.: Abass (22.)
- Y.: Kemenes (32.), Takács (57.), Danilo (83.) – Rajcomar (19.), Pavicevic (32.), Horváth (81.), Bogunovic (83.), Máté (90.), Illés (90.)
- R.: Szalai (38.)

18 September 2010
18:00 CEST

Szombathelyi Haladás	1 – 1 (1–0)	Budapest Honvéd FC
Tóth 28'; Kenesei (yellow card) 60'; Á. Simon (yellow card) 87'	(Report)	Abass (yellow card) 52'; Cuerda (yellow card) 60'; Coira 61'

Rohonci úti Stadion, Szombathely
Attendance: 2,000
Referee: Ferenc Bede
- Szombathelyi Haladás: Rózsa – Schimmer, Guzmics, Korolovszky, Tóth – Rajos, Irhás (Obric 68.), Á. Simon – Nagy, Kenesei, Oross (Sipos 77.). Coach: Aurél Csertői.
- Budapest Honvéd FC: Kemenes – Takács, Botis, Cuerda, Hajdú – Abass (Danilo 57.), Akassou, Coira, Sadjo – Rufino (Conteh 61.), Rouani (Bojtor 85.). Coach: Massimo Morales.
- G.: Tóth (28.) – Coria (61.)
- Y.: Kenesei (60.), Á. Simon (87.) – Abass (52.), Cuerda (60.)

25 September 2010
18:00 CEST

Budapest Honvéd FC	2 – 4 (1–2)	Lombard-Pápa TFC
Abass 26' 61'; Takács (yellow card) 60'; Cuerda (yellow card) 90' (yellow-red card) 90+2'	(Report)	Marić 7'; Bárányos 22' 57'; Farkas (yellow card) 51'; Heffler (yellow card) 60' (goal) 72'

Bozsik József Stadion, Budapest
Attendance: 0
Referee: Ádám Farkas
- Budapest Honvéd FC: Kemenes – Takács, Cuerda, Debreceni, Hajdú – Abass, Coira, Akassou (Conteh 77.), Sadjo (Rufino 65.) – Rouani, Danilo. Coach: Massimo Morales.
- Lombard-Pápa TFC: Szűcs – Takács, Bíró, Farkas, Németh – Quintero, Gyömbér, Bárányos – Abwo (Rebryk 65.), Heffler (Venczel 92.), Maric. Coach: György Véber.
- G.: Abass (26., 61.) – Maric (7.), Bárányos (22., 57.), Heffler (72.)
- Y.: Takács (60.), Cuerda (90.) – Farkas (51.), Heffler (60.)
- R.: Cuerda (92.)

2 October 2010
18:00 CEST

Paksi SE	0 – 1 (0–0)	Budapest Honvéd FC
	(Report)	Sadjo (yellow card) 14'; Bojtor 81'

Stadion PSE, Paks
Attendance: 1,700
Referee: Tamás Bognár
- Paksi SE: Csernyánszki – Fiola, Éger, Sifter, Csehi – Bartha (Böde 60.), Sipeki, Heffler, Vayer – Kiss (Nagy 77.), Montvai. Coach: Károly Kis.
- Budapest Honvéd FC: Kemenes – Sós, Botis, Debreceni, Hajdú – Abass, Coira, Akassou, Sadjo (Bojtor 77.) – Rouani (Danilo 69.), Rufino (Horváth 86.). Coach: Massimo Morales.
- G.: Bojtor (81.)
- Y.: Sadjo (14.)

16 October 2010
17:00 CEST

Budapest Honvéd FC	1 – 2 (0–2)	Kecskeméti TE
Rouani 49'; Akassou (yellow card) 61' (yellow-red card) 78'	(Report)	Tököli 18' 43'; Ebala (yellow card) 45'; Foxi (yellow card) 78'

Bozsik József Stadion, Budapest
Attendance: 3,500
Referee: Zsolt Szabó
- Budapest Honvéd FC: Kemenes – Takács, Debreceni, Botis, Hajdú – Abass, Akassou, Coira (Conteh 72.), Danilo – Rouani (Bojtor 79.), Rufino (Sadjo 60.). Coach: Massimo Morales.
- Kecskeméti TE: Rybánsky – Némedi, Gyagya, Balogh (Lambulic 46.), Mohl – Bori, Ebala (Alempijevic 54.), Cukic – Foxi, Tököli (Litsingi 84.), Bertus. Coach: Tomislav Sivic.
- G.: Rouani (49.) – Tököli (18., 43.)
- Y.: Akassou (61.) – Ebala (45.), Foxi (78.)
- R.: Akassou (78.)

23 October 2010
17:00 CEST

Kaposvári Rákóczi FC	0 – 0 (0–0)	Budapest Honvéd FC
Pavlović (yellow card) 61' (yellow-red card) 68'	(Report)	Coira (yellow card) 40'; Sadjo (yellow card) 83'; Moreira (yellow card) 89'

Stadion Kaposvár Rákóczi, Kaposvár
Attendance: 2,500
Referee: János Takács
- Kaposvári Rákóczi FC: Kovács – Gujic (Kovácsevics 9.), Okuka, Grúz, Zsók – Hegedűs, Kulcsár, Pavlovic, Jawad (Balázs 79.) – Oláh (Szepessy 86.), Peric. Coach: Tibor Sisa.
- Budapest Honvéd FC: Kemenes – Takács, Debreceni, Botis, Hajdú – Moreira, Abass (Rufino 90.), Horváth, Coira, Sadjo (Bojtor 85.) – Rouani (Danilo 43.). Coach: Massimo Morales.
- G.: —
- Y.: Pavlovic (61.) – Coria (40.), Sadjo (83.), Moreira (89.)
- R.: Pavlovic (68.)

29 October 2010
19:00 CEST

Videoton FC Fehérvár	0 – 2 (0–0)	Budapest Honvéd FC
Andić (yellow card) 65'	(Report)	Danilo (yellow card) 11' (goal) 52' 57'; Coira (yellow card) 43'; Moreira (yellow card) 74'

Stadion Sóstói, Székesfehérvár
Attendance: 3,125
Referee: Viktor Kassai
- Videoton FC Fehérvár: Bozovic – Lázár, Lipták, Vaskó, Andic – Gosztonyi (Sándor 60.), Farkas, Elek, Polonkai (Djordjic 68.) – Alves, Nikolic (Mutumba 60.). Coach: György Mezey.
- Budapest Honvéd FC: Kemenes – Takács, Botis, Debreceni, Hajdú – Abass (Rufino 90.), Coira (Horváth 66.), Moreira, Danilo – Bojtor, Rouani (Bajner 83.). Coach: Massimo Morales.
- G.: Danilo (52., 57.)
- Y.: Andic (66.) – Danilo (11.), Coira (43.), Moreira (74.)

7 November 2010
19:00 CEST

Budapest Honvéd FC	1 – 1 (0–0)	Győri ETO FC
Hajdú 48' (pen.)	(Report)	Copa (yellow card) 20'; Bouguerra (yellow card) 34'; Völgyi 67'

Bozsik József Stadion, Budapest
Attendance: 1,500
Referee: Zoltán Iványi
- Budapest Honvéd FC: Kemenes – Takács, Debreceni, Botis, Hajdú – Abass, Horváth (Akassou 72.), Moreira, Danilo – Bojtor (Sadjo 79.), Rouani (Rufino 75.). Coach: Massimo Morales.
- Győri ETO FC: Radosavljevic – Fehér, Stanisic, Eugene, Völgyi – Copa, Kiss (Ji-Paraná 46.), Pilibaitis, Koltai (Aleksidze 65.) – Ceolin (Marinelli 59.), Bouguerra. Coach: Attila Pintér.
- G.: Hajdú (48. – pen.) – Völgyi (67.)
- Y.: Copa (20.), Bouguerra (34.)

13 November 2010
17:30 CEST

Újpest FC	3 – 1 (2–0)	Budapest Honvéd FC
Pollák (yellow card) 17'; Hajdú 40' (o.g.); Böőr 45'; Rajczi 53' (pen.)	(Report)	Danilo (yellow card) 52'; Bajner 82'

Szusza Ferenc Stadium, Budapest
Attendance: 2,791
Referee: István Vad
- Újpest FC: Balajcza – Szokol, Takács, Vermes, Pollák (Kiss 71.) – Böőr (Matos 70.), Tajthy, Rajczi, Mitrovic, Simon (Sitku 79.) – Tisza. Coach: Géza Mészöly.
- Budapest Honvéd FC: Kemenes – Takács, Botis, Debreceni, Hajdú – Danilo (Bajner 80.), Akassou, Coira (Abass 46.), Sadjo – Rouani, Bojtor (Moreira 51.). Coach: Massimo Morales.
- G.: Hajdú (40. – og.), Böőr (45.), Rajczi (53. – pen.) – Bajner (82.)
- Y.: Pollák (19.) – Danilo (52.)

19 November 2010
19:00 CEST

Budapest Honvéd FC	0 – 1 (0–1)	BFC Siófok
Akassou (yellow card) 71'; Hajdú (yellow card) 76'	(Report)	Délczeg 40'; Mogyorósi (yellow card) 47'; Márton (yellow card) 68'; Graszl (yellow card) 72'

Bozsik József Stadion, Budapest
Attendance: 1,000
Referee: Sándor Andó-Szabó
- Budapest Honvéd FC: Kemenes – Takács, Debreceni, Botis, Hajdú – Abass, Akassou, Horváth (Hidi 58.), Moreira – Bojtor (Sadjo 60.; Bajner 75.), Danilo. Coach: László Szalai.
- BFC Siófok: Molnár – Mogyorósi (Kocsis 85.), Graszl, Márton, Novák – Csermelyi (Homma 66.), Tusori, Lukács, Ivancsics – Sowunmi, Délczeg (Horváth 91.). Coach: István Mihalecz.
- G.: Délczeg (40.)
- Y.: Akassou (71.), Hajdú (76.) – Mogyorósi (47.), Márton (68.), Graszl (72.)

26 November 2010
19:00 CEST

Budapest Honvéd FC	0 – 0 (0–0)	Vasas SC
	(Report)	Pavičević (yellow card) 81'

Bozsik József Stadion, Budapest
Attendance: 800
Referee: Zsolt Szabó
- Budapest Honvéd FC: Kemenes – Takács, Debreceni, Botis, Hajdú – Hidi, Coira, Akassou – Rouani (Nagy 83.), Rufino (Czár 46.), Abass (Danilo 75.). Coach: László Szalai.
- Vasas SC: Végh – Balog, Arnaut, Gáspár, Polényi – Arsic (Katona 88.), Dobric (Mundi 75.), Pavicevic, Németh – Lázok, Beliczky (Kovács 90.). Coach: András Komjáti.
- G.: —
- Y.: Pavicevic (81.)

26 February 2011
15:00 CEST

MTK Budapest FC	3 – 1 (1–1)	Budapest Honvéd FC
Sütő 43'; Urbán 76' (yellow card) 84'; Szekeres (yellow card) 79'; Eppel 90+1'	(Report)	Lovrić 25'; Debreceni (yellow card) 55'; Horváth (yellow card) 82'

Hidegkuti Nándor Stadium, Budapest
Attendance: 1,200
Referee: Tamás Bognár
- MTK Budapest FC: Szatmári – Vukadinovic (Hajdú 87.), Szekeres, Sütő, Vadnai – Kanta, Pátkai, A. Pál, Vukmir, Frank (Urbán 64.) – Tischler (Eppel 76.). Coach: József Garami.
- Budapest Honvéd FC: Tóth – Moga (Horváth 42.), Debreceni, Lovric, Hajdú – Sadjo, Akassou, Moreira, Ivancsics (G. Nagy 80.) – Danilo, Bright (Rouani 52.). Coach: Attila Supka.
- G.: Sütő (43.), Urbán (76.), Eppel (90.+1) – Lovric (25.)
- Y.: Szekeres (79.), Urbán (84.) – Debreceni (55.), Horváth (82.)

6 March 2011
17:30 CEST

Budapest Honvéd FC	0 – 1 (0–1)	Ferencvárosi TC
Botis (yellow card) 61'; Lovrić (yellow card) 79'; Hajdú (yellow card) 88'; Zelenka (yellow card) 89'; Akassou (yellow card) 90+2'	(Report)	Stanić 12'; Ranilović (yellow card) 75'; Csizmadia (yellow card) 79'; Abdi (yellow card) 90+3'

Bozsik József Stadion, Budapest
Attendance: 2,500
Referee: József Berger
- Budapest Honvéd FC: Tóth – Lovric, Debreceni, Botis, Hajdú – G. Nagy (Danilo 55.), Hidi (Zelenka 55.), Ivancsics, Akassou, Moreira (Vólent 68.) – Bright. Coach: Attila Supka.
- Ferencvárosi TC: Ranilović – Csizmadia, Tutoric, Balog – Stanic, Maróti, Rósa, Józsi (Tóth 65.) – Schembri, Heinz (Andrezinho 83.), Miljkovic (Abdi 68.). Coach: László Prukner.
- G.: Stanic (12.)
- Y.: Botis (61.), Lovric (79.), Hajdú (88.), Zelenka (89.), Akassou (92.) – Ranilović (75.), Csizmadia (79.), Abdi (93.)

12 March 2011
15:00 CEST

Debreceni VSC	2 – 2 (1–1)	Budapest Honvéd FC
Czvitkovics 45'; Salami 47'; Bernáth (yellow card) 78'	(Report)	Debreceni 21'; Hajdú 62'; Hidi (yellow card) 65'; Lovrić (yellow card) 75'

Stadion Oláh Gábor Út, Debrecen
Attendance: 3,500
Referee: Sándor Andó-Szabó
- Debreceni VSC: Novakovic – Bernáth, Simac, Mijadinoski, Fodor – Czvitkovics, Varga, Ramos (Salami 46.), Szakály (Dombi 77.) – Kabát, Yannick (Farkas 62.). Coach: Zdenek Scasny.
- Budapest Honvéd FC: Kemenes – Lovric, Debreceni, Botis, Hajdú – G. Nagy (Sadjo 78.), Akassou (Hidi 46.), Zelenka (Moreira 52.), Horváth, Ivancsics – Danilo. Coach: Attila Supka.
- G.: Czvitkovics (45.), Salami (47.) – Debreceni (21.), Hajdú (62.)
- Y.: Bernáth (78.) – Hidi (65.), Lovric (75.)

19 March 2011
17:00 CEST

Budapest Honvéd FC	0 – 0 (0–0)	Szolnoki MÁV FC
Fieber (yellow card) 76'	(Report)

Bozsik József Stadion, Budapest
Attendance: 500
Referee: Roland Veizer
- Budapest Honvéd FC: Kemenes – Lovric, Debreceni, Botis, Hajdú – Zelenka (Bright 58.), Akassou, Ivancsics (Fieber 72.), G. Nagy (Kapacina 58.) – Danilo, Moreira. Coach: Attila Supka.
- Szolnoki MÁV FC: Melnichenko – Đurovic, Máté, Milicic, Vukomanovic – Búrány, Némedi, Fitos (Balogh 90.), Remili – Zsolnai (Tchami 77.), Jokic (Szalai 88.). Coach: Antal Simon.
- G.: —
- Y.: Fieber (76.)

2 April 2011
17:30 CEST

Zalaegerszegi TE	2 – 1 (0–0)	Budapest Honvéd FC
Kocsárdi (yellow card) 20'; Turkovs 52'; Kamber (yellow card) 81' (goal) 85'; Panikvar (yellow card) 85'	(Report)	Akassou (yellow card) 22' (goal) 87' (pen.); Horváth (yellow card) 53'; Hajdú (yellow card) 34' (yellow-red card) 64'

ZTE Arena, Zalaegerszeg
Attendance: 2,500
Referee: Ádám Németh
- Zalaegerszegi TE: Sipos – Kocsárdi (Rajcomar 46.), Miljatovic (Kovács 46.), Varga, Panikvar – A. Delic, Szalai (Horváth 55.), Simonfalvi, Kamber, Balázs – Turkovs. Coach: János Csank.
- Budapest Honvéd FC: Kemenes – Sadjo (Vólent 56.), Debreceni, Botis, Hajdú – Moreira, Akassou, Zelenka (G. Nagy 46.), Horváth, Ivancsics – Rouani (Bajner 75.). Coach: Attil Supka.
- G.: Turkovs (52.), Kamber (85.) – Akassou (87. – pen.)
- Y.: Kocsárdi (20.), Kamber (81.), Panikvar (85.) – Akassou (22.), Hajdú (34.), Horváth (53.)
- R.: Hajdú (64.)

9 April 2011
17:30 CEST

Budapest Honvéd FC	3 – 1 (1–0)	Szombathelyi Haladás
Lovrić 40' (yellow card) 47' (goal) 69'; Sadjo (yellow card) 56'; Ivancsics 78'	(Report)	Nagy (yellow card) 25'; Simon (yellow card) 34'; Lengyel (yellow card) 43'; Sipos (yellow card) 72'; Halmosi 75'

Bozsik József Stadion, Budapest
Attendance: 1,200
Referee: István Vad
- Budapest Honvéd FC: Kemenes – Lovric, Debreceni, Botis, Sadjo – Moreira (G. Nagy 77.), Hidi, Zelenka (Labudovic 87.), Horváth, Ivancsics – Brigh (Vólent 80.). Coach: Attila Supka.
- Szombathelyi Haladás: Rózsa – II Nagy, Lengyel, Korolovszky, Tóth – Irhás (Sipos 46.), Á. Simon (Molnár 75.), Halmosi, Sluka – Kenesei, Fodrek. Coach: Zoltán Aczél.
- G.: Lovric (40., 69.), Ivancsics (78.) – Halmosi (75.)
- Y.: Lovric (47.), Sadjo (56.) – II Nagy (25.), Á. Simon (34.), Lengyel (43.), Sipos (72.)

16 April 2011
18:00 CEST

Lombard-Pápa TFC	0 – 1 (0–1)	Budapest Honvéd FC
Heffler (yellow card) 22'; P. Takács (yellow card) 90+4'	(Report)	Moreira (yellow card) 15'; Bright 20'; Horváth; Lovrić (yellow card) 69'; Vólent (yellow card) 90+3'

Stadion Várkerti, Pápa
Attendance: 2,000
Referee: János Takács
- Lombard-Pápa TFC: Szűcs – Nagy (P. Takács 66.), Quintero (Szabó 53.), Dlusztus, Supic, Németh – Zulevs (Bali 79.), Gyömbér, Bárányos – Maric, Heffler. Coach: György Véber.
- Budapest Honvéd FC: Kemenes – Lovric, Debreceni, Botis, Hajdú – Moreira (G. Nagy 70.), Hidi, Zelenka, Horváth (Akassou 77.), Ivancsics – Bright (Vólent 66.). Coach: Attila Supka.
- G.: Bright (20.)
- Y.: Heffler (22.), P. Takács (90.+4) – Moreira (15.), Horváth (60.), Lovric (69.), Vólent (90.+3)

23 April 2011
18:00 CEST

Budapest Honvéd FC	1 – 0 (0–0)	Paksi SE
Lovrić 33'; Ivancsics (yellow card) 88'; Debreceni (yellow card) 90+2'	(Report)	Nagy (yellow card) 35'; Fiola (yellow card) 41'

Bozsik József Stadion, Budapest
Attendance: 1,200
Referee: Gábor Oláh
- Budapest Honvéd FC: Kemenes – Lovric, Botis, Debreceni, Hajdú – Moreira, Horváth (Akassou 69.), Zelenka (Sadjo 81.), Hidi, Ivancsics – Bright (Vólent 61.). Coach: Attila Supka.
- Paksi SE: Csernyánszki – Heffler, Éger, Fiola, Szabó – Magasföldi, Sifter, Böde (Nagy 67.), Sipeki (Báló 28.) – Kiss (Haraszti 67.), Vayer. Coach: Károly Kis.
- G.: Lovric (33.)
- Y.: Ivancsics (88.), Debreceni (90.+2) – Nagy (35.), Fiola (41.)

26 April 2011
18:00 CEST

Kecskeméti TE	2 – 1 (1–1)	Budapest Honvéd FC
Mohl 27'; Čukić (yellow card) 38'; Tököli (yellow card) 76'; Vujović (yellow card) 81'; Sadjo 84' (o.g.)	(Report)	Zelenka 29' (yellow card) 38'; G. Nagy (yellow card) 82'

Széktói Stadion, Kecskemét
Attendance: 2,000
Referee: Ádám Farkas
- Kecskeméti TE: Rybánsky – Alempijevic (Bertus 78.), Radanovic, Balogh, Mohl – Bori (Dosso 57.), Ebala, Litsingi (Vujovic 65.), Cukic, Foxi – Tököli. Coach: Tomislav Sivic.
- Budapest Honvéd FC: Kemenes – Lovric, Botis, Debreceni, Hajdú – Moreira (Sadjo 53.), Hidi, Zelenka (G. Nagy 79.), Horváth, Ivancsics – Bright (Danilo 27.). Coach: Attila Supka.
- G.: Mohl (27.), Sadjo (84. – o.g.) – Zelenka (29.)
- Y.: Cukic (38.), Tököli (76.), Vujovic (81.) – Zelenka (38.), G. Nagy (82.)

30 April 2011
18:00 CEST

Budapest Honvéd FC	1 – 0 (0–0)	Kaposvári Rákóczi FC
Danilo 53'; Zelenka (yellow card) 83'	(Report)	Pavlović (yellow card) 58'; Perić (yellow card) 81'

Bozsik József Stadion, Budapest
Attendance: 1,800
Referee: Ádám Radványi
- Budapest Honvéd FC: Kemenes – Lovric, Botis, Debreceni, Hajdú – Moreira (G. Nagy 88.), Horváth, Zelenka, Hidi, Ivancsics – Danilo (Vólent 74.). Coach: Attila Supka.
- Kaposvári Rákóczi FC: Kovács – Okuka, Grúz, Zsók, Gujic (Korhut 64.) – Pavlovic (Jawad 77.), Hegedűs, Máté, Balázs (Grumic 57.) – Oláh, Peric. Coach: Tibor Sisa.
- G.: Danilo (53.)
- Y.: Zelenka (83.) – Pavlovic (58.), Peric (81.)

8 May 2011
17:30 CEST

Budapest Honvéd FC	2 – 2 (2–2)	Videoton FC Fehérvár
Zelenka 31'; Botis (yellow card) 33'; Danilo (yellow card) 33'; Ivancsics 43'	(Report)	Alves 10'; Nikolić (yellow card) 12'; Gosztonyi 13'; Andić (yellow card) 23'; Vaskó (yellow card) 41'

Bozsik József Stadion, Budapest
Attendance: 3,500
Referee: Sándor Andó-Szabó
- Budapest Honvéd FC: Kemenes – Lovric, Botis, Debreceni, Hajdú – Moreira (G. Nagy 89.), Hidi, Zelenka, Horváth (Akassou 75.), Ivancsics – Danilo. Coach: Attila Supka.
- Videoton FC Fehérvár: Bozovic – Lázár, Lipták, Vaskó, Andic – Gosztonyi, Sándor, Elek (Lencse 75.), Vasiljevic (Farkas 63.) – Alves, Nikolic (Polonkai 63.). Coach: György Mezey.
- G.: Zelenka (31.), Ivancsics (43.) – Alves (10.), Gosztonyi (13.)
- Y.: Botis (33.), Danilo (33.) – Nikolic (12.), Andic (23.), Vaskó (41.)

11 May 2011
20:00 CEST

Győri ETO FC	3 – 0 (0–0)	Budapest Honvéd FC
Völgyi 48'; Kiss 57'; Aleksidze 62'	(Report)

Stadion ETO, Győr
Attendance: 1,500
Referee: Tamás Bognár
- Győri ETO FC: Stevanovic – Takács, Dordevic, Fehér, Völgyi – Kiss (Tokody 83.), Ji-Paraná, Pilibaitis, Dinjar (Dudás 80.) – Koltai (Ceolin 84.), Aleksidze. Coach: Aurél Csertői.
- Budapest Honvéd FC: Kemenes – Lovric, Botis, Debreceni, Hajdú – Moreira (Erdélyi 60.), Horváth (Akassou 66.), Vécsei, Hidi, Ivancsics – Bright (Vólent 60.). Coach: Attila Supka.
- G.: Völgyi (48.), Kiss (57.), Aleksidze (62.)
- Y.: —

14 May 2011
15:00 CEST

Budapest Honvéd FC	1 – 4 (0–3)	Újpest FC
Horváth (yellow card) 40'; Hajdú (yellow card) 50'; Danilo 57'; Botis (yellow card) 68'	(Report)	Ahjupera 9'; Balogh 36'; Tajthy (yellow card) 38'; Balajti 40'; Rajczi 88'

Bozsik József Stadion, Budapest
Attendance: 2,000
Referee: István Vad
- Budapest Honvéd FC: Kemenes – Lovric, Botis, Debreceni, Hajdú – Moreira (G. Nagy 27.), Horváth, Zelenka (Vécsei 46.), Hidi (Bright 71.), Ivancsics – Danilo. Coach: Attila Supka.
- Újpest FC: Balajcza – Szokol, Litauszki, Takács, Pollák (Tajthy 28.) – Balajti (Rajczi 59.), Mitrovic, Egerszegi (Szalai 61.), Balogh – Lázár, Ahjupera. Coach: Géza Mészöly.
- G.: Danilo (57.) – Ahjupera (9.), Balogh (36.), Balajti (40.), Rajczi (88.)
- Y.: Horváth (40.), Hajdú (50.), Botis (68.) – Tajthy (38.)

22 May 2011
15:00 CEST

BFC Siófok	1 – 3 (1–1)	Budapest Honvéd FC
Mogyorósi (yellow card) 18'; Novák (yellow card) 24'; Homma 40'; Márton (yellow card) 46'; Melczer (yellow card) 67'; Tusori (yellow card) 87'	(Report)	Danilo 6'; Zelenka (yellow card) 25'; Vernes (yellow card) 48'; Délczeg 51' (o.g.); Czár 90'

Révesz Géza Stadion, Siófok
Attendance: 850
Referee: Katalin Kulcsár
- BFC Siófok: Molnár – Mogyorósi, Márton (Graszl 55.), Fehér, Novák – Csordás, Tusori, Ludánszki (László 46.), Melczer – Homma, Délczeg (Isaac 75.). Coach: István Mihalecz.
- Budapest Honvéd FC: Kemenes – Akassou, Lovric, Debreceni, Hajdú – Danilo, Hidi, Zelenka (G. Nagy 35.), Horváth, Ivancsics (Czár 81.) – Vernes (Vécsei 71.). Coach: Attila Supka.
- G.: Homma (40.) – Danilo (6.), Délczeg (51. – og.), Czár (90.)
- Y.: Mogyorósi (18.), Novák (24.), Márton (46.), Melczer (67.), Tusori (87.) – Zelenka (25.), Vernes (48.)

== Hungarian Cup ==
=== Third round ===
22 September 2010
15:30 CEST

Budaörsi SC	1 – 2 (0–1)	Budapest Honvéd FC
Tüske 71'; Pleván (yellow card) 79'; Farkas (yellow card) 88'; Mihályi (red card) 90+1'	(Report)	Conteh 4'; Hajdú (yellow card) 54'; Debreceni 89'; Moreira (yellow card) 90'

Árok utcai Stadion, Budaörs
Attendance: 400
Referee: Róbert Nagy
- Budaörsi SC: Kozma – Pleván, L. Horváth (Kiss 38.), Lászka, Lőrincz (Papp 80.) – Tüske, Melczer, Csobánki, Hegedűs (Sándor 74.) – Mihályi, Farkas. Coach: Tamás Lucsánszky.
- Budapest Honvéd FC: Tóth – Sós, Debreceni, Botis, Hajdú – Abass, Horváth (Coira 46.), Moreira, Bojtor – Conteh (Danilo 71.), Rufino (Sadjo 54.). Coach: Massimo Morales.
- G.: Tüske (71.) – Conteh (4.), Debreceni (89.)
- Y.: Pleván (79.), Farkas (88.) – Hajdú (54.), Moreira (90.)
- R.: Mihályi (91.)

=== Fourth round ===
20 October 2010
14:30 CEST

Putnok VSE	1 – 3 (0–1)	Budapest Honvéd FC
Madarász (yellow card) 32'; Roza (yellow card) 80'; Sápi 90'	(Report)	Danilo 4' 95' 117'; Hajdú (yellow card) 35'; Sadjo (yellow card) 80'; Bojtor (yellow card) 89'

Városi Stadion, Putnok
Attendance: 500
Referee: Alvaro Garcia Miquel
- Putnoki VSE: Roza – Sebők (Lenkey 88.), Nagy, Hanász, Boczki – Madarász, Balogh, Gál, Mészáros (Darai 63.) – Monyók (Zimányi 64.), Sápi. Coach: Péter Koszta.
- Budapest Honvéd FC: Tóth – Horváth, Debreceni, Cséke, Hajdú – Moreira, Akassou, Danilo, Conteh (Rouani 66.) – Bojtor, Rufino (Sadjo 58.). Coach: Massimo Morales.
- G.: Sápi (90.) – Danilo (4., 95., 117.)
- Y.: Madarász (32.), Roza (80.) – Hajdú (35.), Sadjo (80.), Bojtor (89.)

=== Fifth round ===
==== First leg ====
9 November 2010
13:30 CEST

Egri FC	0 – 3 (0–0)	Budapest Honvéd FC
Romhányi (yellow card) 55'; Káposzta (yellow card) 70'	(Report)	Bajner 63'; Cuerda (red card) 68'; Akassou 70' (pen.); Rouani 75'

Városi Stadion, Eger
Attendance: 900
Referee: Ádám Radványi
- Eger FC: Illyés – Debreceni, Káposzta, Kiskapusi, Szűcs – Romhányi (Kotula 80.), Zováth, Vén (Kéki 70.), Busai – Bardi, Hamar (Bezzeg 65.). Coach: István László.
- Budapest Honvéd FC: Tóth – Horváth, Debreceni, Cuerda, Sadjo – Akassou, Coira – Sós, Rufino (Rouani 57.), Bojtor – Bajner (Botis 71.). Coach: Massimo Morales.
- G.: Bajner (63.), Akassou (70. – pen.), Rouani (75.)
- Y.: Romhányi (55.), Káposzta (70.)
- R.: Cuerda (68.)

==== Second leg ====
23 November 2010
17:00 CEST

Budapest Honvéd FC	7 – 0 (5–0) ( 10 – 0 agg.)	Egri FC
Rufino 4' 27'; Cséke 29' (pen.) 42'; Rouani 45' (yellow card) 64' (goal) 88'; Stokić 80'	(Report)

Bozsik József Stadion, Budapest
Attendance: 300
Referee: Gyöngyi Gaál
- Budapest Honvéd FC: Tóth – Baráth, Cséke, Debreceni, Hajdú (Czár 54.) – Horváth (Nagy 63.) – Sós, Coira, Stokic – Rouani, Rufino (Hidi 59.). Coach: László Szalai.
- Eger FC: Illyés (Gömöri 46.) – Debreceni, Káposzta, Kiskapusi, Busai – Kálmán (Halász 84.), Bezzeg, Kéki, Hamar – Romhányi, Kotula (Szilágyi 76.). Coach: István László.
- G.: Rufino (4., 27.), Cséke (29. – pen., 42.), Rouani (45., 88.), Stokic (80.)
- Y.: Rouani (64.)

Budapest Honvéd FC won 10–0 on aggregate.

=== Quarter-final ===
==== First leg ====
9 March 2011
18:00 CEST

Budapest Honvéd FC	1 – 1 (1–0)	Videoton FC Fehérvár
Zelenka 22' (yellow card) 85'	(Report)	Nikolić 71'

Bozsik József Stadion, Budapest
Attendance: 900
Referee: Zsolt Szabó
- Budapest Honvéd FC: Kemenes – Horváth (Akassou 62.), Botis, Hajdú, Lovric – Debreceni, Hidi, Sadjo, Vólent (Bright 78.) – Danilo (Azevedo 62.), Zelenka. Coach: Attila Supka.
- Videoton FC Fehérvár: Bozovic – Hidvégi, Lipták, Lázár, Vaskó – Vasiljevic, Szakály (Gosztonyi 62.), Sándor, Milanovic (Polonkai 46.) – Djordjic (Nikolic 46.), Lencse. Coach: György Mezey.
- G.: Zelenka (22.) – Nikolic (71.)
- Y.: Zelenka (85.)

==== Second leg ====
15 March 2011
18:00 CEST

Videoton FC Fehérvár	4 – 0 (2–0) ( 5 – 1 agg.)	Budapest Honvéd FC
Gosztonyi 3' (yellow card) 48'; Lencse 27' 80'; Vaskó (yellow card) 79'; Gyurcsó 90'	(Report)	Lovrić (yellow card) 45'; Akassou (yellow card) 53'; Vólent (yellow card) 59'; Ivancsics (yellow card) 64'

Stadion Sóstói, Székesfehérvár
Attendance: 2000
Referee: Zoltán Iványi
- Videoton FC Fehérvár: Bozovic – Anđic, Vaskó, Milanovic, Izing – Szakály, Polonkai, Sándor, Gosztonyi (Gyurcsó 61.) – Lencse (B. Elek 81.), Alves (Vasiljevic 46.). Coach: György Mezey.
- Budapest Honvéd FC: Kemenes – Akassou, Botis, Lovric, Debreceni – Hajdú, Horváth (Sadjo 46.), Ivancsics (Fieber 72.), Moreira – Bright (Danilo 46.), Vólent. Coach: Attila Supka.
- G.: Gosztonyi (3.), Lencse (27., 80.), Gyurcsó (90.)
- Y.: Gosztonyi (48.), Vaskó (79.) – Lovric (45.), Akassou (53.), Vólent (59.), Ivancsics (64.)

Videoton FC Fehérvár won 5–1 on aggregate.

== League Cup ==
=== Group stage ===
Pos	Team	Pld	W	D	L	GF	GA	GD	Pts	Qualification	KEC	SZL	HON
1	Kecskemét	4	3	1	0	11	3	+8	10	Advance to knockout phase	—	4–0	4–2
2	Szolnok	4	1	1	2	6	10	−4	4		1–1	—	3–4
3	Honvéd	4	1	0	3	7	11	−4	3		0–2	1–2	—

24 July 2010
17:00 CEST

Budapest Honvéd FC	1 – 2 (1–0)	Szolnoki MÁV FC
Haruna 32'; Cséke (yellow card) 38'; A. Horváth (yellow card) 67'	(Report)	Mile (yellow card) 22'; Búrány (yellow card) 52'; Koós 60'; Pető 70'

Bozsik József Stadion, Budapest
Attendance: 700
Referee: János Takács
- Budapest Honvéd FC: Kunsági – Baráth, Cséke, Sós, Bojtor – Azevedo, A. Horváth (Debreceni 70.), Hidi, Vólent (Conteh 65.) – Bajner, Haruna. Coach: Massimo Morales.
- Szolnoki MÁV FC: Tarczy – B. Szalai, Gy. Hegedűs, Pető, Cornaci (P. Balogh 80.) – Búrány (Benedek 86.), Z. Molnár, Antal, Mile – Hevesi-Tóth, Koós (Blaskovits 83.). Coach: Attila Vágó.
- G.: Haruna (32.) – Koós (60.), Pető (70.)
- Y.: Cséke (38.), A. Horváth (67.) – Mile (22.), Búrány (52.)

28 July 2010
19:00 CEST

Kecskeméti TE	4 – 2 (3–0)	Budapest Honvéd FC
Wilson 32' 69'; A. Simon 33'; Koncz 43'	(Report)	Cséke (yellow card) 45'; Haruna 46'; Vólent 66'

Széktói Stadion, Kecskemét
Attendance: 400
Referee: Gábor Oláh
- Kecskeméti TE: Z. Tóth – Bori (I. Farkas 60.), Gyagya, Koncz, Alempijevic (Foxi 46.) – Cukic (Tölgyesi 46.), Bertus, Bagi, Wilson – A. Simon (Ebala 10.), Dosso (T. Szabó 60.). Coach: István Urbányi.
- Budapest Honvéd FC: Kunsági – Baráth (G. Nagy 46.), Remes, Cséke, Czár (A. Nagy 46.) – Sós, Hidi, A. Horváth (Azevedo 46.), Bojtor (M. Farkas 75.) – Vólent, Haruna (Vernes 72.). Coach: Krisztián Gabala.
- G.: Wilson (32., 69.), A. Simon (33.), Koncz (43.) – Haruna (46.), Vólent (66.)
- Y.: Cséke (45.)

1 December 2010
12:45 CEST

Szolnoki MÁV FC	3 – 4 (2–1)	Budapest Honvéd FC
Remili 33'; Rokszin (yellow card) 42'; Ngalle 43'; Hevesi-Tóth 63'; Vörös (red card) 90'	(Report)	Rufino 21' 47' 60'; Nagy 76'

Tiszaligeti Stadion, Szolnok
Attendance: 500
Referee: Eszter Urbán
- Szolnoki MÁV FC: Tarczy – Molnár (Mile 62.), Rokszin, Ngalle (Hevesi-Tóth 46.), Alex (Kalmár 46.) – Stanisic, Vörös, Antal (Koós 62.), Búrány – Tchami (Lengyel 46.), Ramili. Coach: Antal Simon.
- Budapest Honvéd FC: Kunsági – Baráth, Debreceni, Cséke (Varga 62.), Hajdú – Sós (Nagy 46.), Hidi, Horváth (Tisza 75.), Czár (Bojtor 46.) – Bajner (Moreira 56.), Rufino. Coach: László Szalai.
- G.: Remili (33.), Ngalle (43.), Hevesi-Tóth (63.) – Rufino (21., 47., 60.), Nagy (76.)
- Y.: Rokszin (42.)
- R.: Vörös (90.)

4 December 2010
13:00 CEST

Budapest Honvéd FC	0 – 2 (0–1)	Kecskeméti TE
Hajdú (yellow card) 70'	(Report)	Alempijević 25' (yellow card) 68'; Mohl (yellow card) 31'; Tököli (yellow card) 41'; Dosso 56'; Balogh (yellow card) 75'; Koszó (yellow card) 89'

Bozsik József Stadion, Budapest
Attendance: 700
Referee: Ádám Radványi
- Budapest Honvéd FC: Kemenes – Takács (Varga 62.), Debreceni, Cséke, Hajdú – Sós (Vólent 53.), Horváth (Bojtor 65.), Hidi, Akassou (Nagy 70.) – Rufino (Rouani 78.), Abass. Coach: László Szalai.
- Kecskeméti TE: Tóth – Koszó, Balogh, Gyagya, Mohl (Farkas 66.) – Ebala, Savic (Bertus 46.), Litsingi (Dosso 46.), Foxi (Patvaros 62.) – Alempijevic, Tököli (Csordás 46.). Coach: Tomislav Sivic.
- G.: Alempijevic (25.), Dosso (56.)
- Y.: Hajdú (70.) – Mohl (31.), Tököli (41.), Alempijevic (68.), Balogh (75.), Koszó (89.)
