= 2009–10 Budapest Honvéd FC season =

Honvéd
2009–10 season
- Owner: George Hemingway
- Manager: Tibor Sisa (until 23 October 2009); Massimo Morales (from 27 October)
- Stadium: Bozsik József Stadion
- Nemzeti Bajnokság I: 9th
- Magyar Kupa: Semi-finals
- Ligakupa: Second group stage
- Szuperkupa: Runners-up
- UEFA Europa League: Third qualifying round
- Highest home attendance: 4,000 v Ferencváros (22 May 2010, Nemzeti Bajnokság I)
- Lowest home attendance: 100 (multiple Ligakupa matches)
- Average home league attendance: 1,560
- Biggest win: 5–0 v Nyíregyháza (Away, 17 March 2010, Ligakupa)
- Biggest defeat: 1–5 v Fenerbahçe (Away, 30 July 2009, UEFA Europa League)

The 2009–10 season was Budapest Honvéd Football Club's 96th competitive season, 6th consecutive season in the Nemzeti Bajnokság I and 102nd year in existence as a football club. In addition to the domestic league, Honvéd participated in that season's editions of the Magyar Kupa, the Ligakupa, the Szuperkupa and the UEFA Europa League.

== Squad ==
Squad at end of season

Note: Flags indicate national team as defined under FIFA eligibility rules; some limited exceptions apply. Players may hold more than one non-FIFA nationality.

No.	Pos.	Nation	Player
1	GK	HUN	Iván Tóth
3	FW	HUN	Norbert Palásthy
4	DF	HUN	György Cséke
5	DF	UKR	Pavlo Yanchuk
6	DF	ROU	Sorin Botiș
7	FW	HUN	Roland Vólent
8	MF	HUN	Norbert Hajdú
9	MF	SVK	Viliam Macko
11	FW	HUN	Róbert Zsolnai
13	DF	HUN	Zoltán Nagy
14	DF	HUN	András Debreceni
15	MF	CIV	Jean-Baptiste Akassou
17	FW	SEN	Abass Cheikh Dieng
18	FW	CIV	Abraham Gneki Guié
19	MF	BRA	Diego
20	DF	ESP	Fernando Cuerda
21	DF	HUN	Gergő Gohér
22	DF	FRA	Gary Tavars
23	FW	ITA	Angelo Vaccaro

No.	Pos.	Nation	Player
24	MF	HUN	Adrián Horváth
25	DF	HUN	Máté Madar
26	MF	HUN	Patrik Hidi
27	FW	BRA	Guilherme Moreira
28	DF	ESP	Pablo Coira
29	MF	HUN	Ákos Takács
32	FW	HUN	Attila Szili
33	GK	HUN	Gábor Németh
34	MF	HUN	Richárd Vernes
35	MF	ROU	Sergiu Moga
36	DF	HUN	Botond Baráth
55	DF	SRB	Dragan Vukmir
71	GK	HUN	Szabolcs Kemenes
85	MF	HUN	László Bojtor
90	GK	HUN	Roland Kunsági
99	FW	HUN	Bálint Bajner
—	MF	HUN	Gábor Freud
—	FW	HUN	Dávid Kleiber

== Competitions ==
=== Overview ===
Competition	First match	Last match	Starting round	Final position	Record							
Competition	First match	Last match	Starting round	Final position	Pld	W	D	L	GF	GA	GD	Win %
Nemzeti Bajnokság I	25 July 2009	22 May 2010	Matchday 1	9th	30	9	11	10	38	35	+3	30.00
Magyar Kupa	7 October 2009	13 April 2010	Round of 32	Semi-finals	7	3	2	2	10	8	+2	42.86
Ligakupa	16 February 2010	7 April 2010	Second group stage	Second group stage	6	1	2	3	8	8	+0	16.67
Szuperkupa	18 July 2009		Final	Runners-up	1	0	0	1	0	1	−1	0.00
UEFA Europa League	30 July 2009	6 August 2009	Third qualifying round	Third qualifying round	2	0	1	1	2	6	−4	0.00
Total					46	13	16	17	58	58	+0	28.26

Source: Competitions

=== Szuperkupa ===
Honvéd, as Magyar Kupa winners in the previous season, played against Debrecen in the 2009 Szuperkupa, who themselves won the Nemzeti Bajnokság I.

18 July 2009 Final	Honvéd	0–1	Debrecen	Siófok
19:00 CEST (UTC+2)	Diego (yellow card) 20'; Angoua (red card) 75'	Report	Mohl (yellow card) 15'; Z. Nagy (yellow card) 21'; Komlósi (yellow card) 72'; P. Szilágyi 83'; Spitzmüller (yellow card) 90+2'	Stadium: Révész Géza utcai Stadion; Attendance: 1,500; Referee: Sándor Andó-Szabó; Assistant referees: György Ring, István Albert; Fourth official: Zoltán Iványi

=== Nemzeti Bajnokság I ===
==== League table ====
Pos	Team	Pld	W	D	L	GF	GA	GD	Pts
7	Ferencváros	30	10	11	9	34	35	−1	41
8	Haladás	30	10	9	11	46	49	−3	39
9	Honvéd	30	9	11	10	38	35	+3	38
10	Kecskemét	30	10	7	13	50	56	−6	37
11	Pápa	30	10	5	15	39	50	−11	35

Source: soccerway.com
Rules for classification: 1st points; 2nd overall wins; 3rd goal difference; 4th goals scored

==== Results summary ====
Overall								Home						Away					
Pld	W	D	L	GF	GA	GD	Pts	W	D	L	GF	GA	GD	W	D	L	GF	GA	GD
30	9	11	10	38	35	+3	38	4	7	4	21	17	+4	5	4	6	17	18	−1

Source: Hungarian Football Federation

==== Results by round ====
Round	1	2	3	4	5	6	7	8	9	10	11	12	13	14	15	16	17	18	19	20	21	22	23	24	25	26	27	28	29	30
Ground	H	A	H	A	H	A	H	A	H	H	A	H	A	H	A	A	H	A	H	A	H	A	H	A	A	H	A	H	A	H
Result	W	L	L	L	D	L	L	W	L	D	D	L	W	D	D	L	W	L	D	W	D	D	W	W	D	D	W	D	L	W
Position	3	7	9	12	14	15	15	13	15	15	15	16	14	14	14	14	14	14	14	13	14	13	12	12	11	10	9	9	9	9
Points	3	3	3	3	4	4	4	7	7	8	9	9	12	13	14	14	17	17	18	21	22	23	26	29	30	31	34	35	35	38

Source: Matches
A = Away; H = Home; W = Win; D = Draw; L = Loss

==== Matches ====
25 July 2009 1	Honvéd	3–1	Kaposvár	Budapest
17:30 CEST (UTC+2)	Hajdú 47'; Guié 66'; Hrepka 78'; Diego (yellow card) 85'	Report	Z. Farkas (yellow card) 47'; Grúz (red card) 49'; Kovácsevics (yellow card) 64'; Pest (red card) 70'; K. Farkas 83'	Stadium: Bozsik József Stadion; Attendance: 1,000; Referee: János Takács; Assistant referees: Lajos L. Tóth, Péter Berettyán; Fourth official: Csaba Sándor

2 August 2009 2	MTK	2–1	Honvéd	Budapest
20:00 CEST (UTC+2)	M. Molnár 6'; Lencse 22'; Zsidai (yellow card) 28'; Gosztonyi (yellow card) 32'; Vadnai (yellow card) 61'	Report	Hajdú 10'; Debreceni (yellow card) 90+1'	Stadium: Hidegkuti Nándor Stadion; Attendance: 2,000; Referee: Zoltán Iványi; Assistant referees: Zsolt Szpisják, János Medovarszki; Fourth official: Balázs Berke

15 August 2009 4	Videoton	2–0	Honvéd	Székesfehérvár
17:30 CEST (UTC+2)	Alves 25' (pen.); Milanović (yellow card) 27'; Présinger 66'	Report	Angoua (yellow card) 24'; Zsolnai (yellow card) 72'; Macko (red card) 85'	Stadium: Sóstói Stadion; Attendance: 3,120; Referee: Mihály Fábián; Assistant referees: Gyula Ortó, János Demeter; Fourth official: Ádám Radványi

23 August 2009 5	Honvéd	1–1	Újpest	Budapest
17:30 CEST (UTC+2)	Debreceni (yellow card) 34'; Hajdú (yellow card) 63'; Hrepka 82'	Report	Kéthévoama 30'; Pollák (yellow card) 40'; Vermes (yellow card) 73'	Stadium: Bozsik József Stadion; Attendance: 2,500; Referee: Tamás Arany; Assistant referees: Gábor Erős, László Viszokai; Fourth official: J. Zoltán Kovács

30 August 2009 6	Győr	2–0	Honvéd	Győr
20:00 CEST (UTC+2)	Pilibaitis (yellow card) 15'; Kink 18'; Đorđević 27'; Babić (yellow card) 65'	Report	Ad. Horváth (yellow card) 20'; Botiș (yellow card) 32'; Pastva (yellow card) 38'; Angoua (yellow card) 44'; Moreira (yellow card) 79'	Stadium: ETO Park; Attendance: 2,500; Referee: Ferenc Bede; Assistant referees: Balázs Farkas, Zoltán Kovács; Fourth official: Gergő Király

12 September 2009 7	Honvéd	0–1	Kecskemét	Budapest
19:00 CEST (UTC+2)	Pastva (yellow card) 17'; Angoua (yellow card) 34'; Botiș (yellow card) 69'; Debreceni (yellow card) 81'	Report	Savić 70'; Alempijević (yellow card) 78'	Stadium: Bozsik József Stadion; Attendance: 1,500; Referee: Viktor Kassai; Assistant referees: Tibor Vígh, István Tóth; Fourth official: József Erdős

19 September 2009 8	Diósgyőr	1–2	Honvéd	Miskolc
19:00 CEST (UTC+2)	Gohér (yellow card) 31'; G. Horváth I (yellow card) 53'; Miličić 90+2'	Report	Hrepka 7', (yellow card) 84'; Debreceni (yellow card) 21'; Angoua (yellow card) 65'; Macko 66' (pen.); Hajdú (yellow card) 90'	Stadium: Diósgyőri Stadion; Attendance: 2,500; Referee: Szabolcs Szilasi; Assistant referees: Attila Kelemen, Zsolt Butkai; Fourth official: Tibor Gyarmati II

26 September 2009 9	Honvéd	1–3	Pápa	Budapest
19:00 CEST (UTC+2)	Macko (yellow card) 52'; Botiș (yellow card) 57'; Hajdú 89'	Report	A. Farkas (yellow card) 10'; Bárányos 16'; Orosz 48', 81'; Gyömbér (yellow card) 69'; Béres (yellow card) 88'	Stadium: Bozsik József Stadion; Attendance: 1,000; Referee: Roland Veizer; Assistant referees: Balázs Farkas, Zsolt Butkai; Fourth official: Ádám Radványi

2 October 2009 10	Honvéd	3–3	Vasas	Budapest
19:00 CEST (UTC+2)	Cséke 9'; Bajner 18', (red card) 90+2'; Hrepka 28'; Macko (yellow card) 52'; Diego (yellow card) 56'; Z. Nagy (yellow card) 58'	Report	Lázok 6', 57' (pen.), 71', (yellow card) 88'; Mrđanin (yellow card) 7'; Zs. Balog (yellow card) 24'; Divić (yellow card) 43'; Pavičević (yellow card) 90'	Stadium: Bozsik József Stadion; Attendance: 1,800; Referee: Sándor Andó-Szabó; Assistant referees: István Albert, Tibor Vígh; Fourth official: Tibor Gyarmati II

17 October 2009 11	Haladás	2–2	Honvéd	Szombathely
18:00 CEST (UTC+2)	Oross 5'; A. Simon II 47'; Rajos (yellow card) 68'	Report	Botiș 16'; Hrepka (yellow card) 37', (goal) 82'; Hidi (yellow card) 60'; Macko (yellow card) 90+1'	Stadium: Rohonci út Attendance: 3,500; Referee: Szabolcs Szilasi; Assistant referees: Gábor Takács, Gábor Gyürüsi; Fourth official: Dániel Becséri

23 October 2009 12	Honvéd	0–1	Zalaegerszeg	Budapest
19:00 CEST (UTC+2)	Bajner (yellow card) 37'; Angoua (yellow card) 65'	Report	Kamber (yellow card) 49'; Magasföldi 73'	Stadium: Bozsik József Stadion; Attendance: 1,000; Referee: József Berger; Assistant referees: Attila Forgács, Zoltán Kis; Fourth official: Gergő Janitz

31 October 2009 13	Nyíregyháza	0–1	Honvéd	Nyíregyháza
17:00 CET (UTC+1)	Goia (yellow card) 27'	Report	Z. Nagy 9'; Hrepka (yellow card) 20'; Moreira (red card) 82'; Macko (yellow card) 90'	Stadium: Városi Stadion; Attendance: 1,500; Referee: István Vad; Assistant referees: Zsolt Márton, Tamás Márkus; Fourth official: Róbert Nagy

7 November 2009 14	Honvéd	1–1	Paks	Budapest
16:00 CET (UTC+1)	Hajdú (yellow card) 45'; Macko (yellow card) 47'; Palásthy 67'	Report	T. Kiss 20'; Böde (yellow card) 44'; Gévay (yellow card) 48'; J. Szabó (yellow card) 80'	Stadium: Bozsik József Stadion; Attendance: 700; Referee: Ferenc Bede; Assistant referees: György Ring, Zsolt Butkai; Fourth official: Gergely Szőts

13 November 2009 15	Ferencváros	0–0	Honvéd	Budapest
19:00 CET (UTC+1)	Morrison (yellow card) 23'; Ferenczi (penalty missed) 60'; D. Kulcsár (yellow card) 61'; Lipcsei (yellow card) 72'	Report	Ad. Horváth (yellow card) 48'; Z. Nagy (yellow card) 59'; Vukmir (yellow card) 88'	Stadium: Stadion Albert Flórián; Attendance: 0 Referee: Péter Solymosi; Assistant referees: Róbert Kispál, Attila Kelemen; Fourth official: Ádám Farkas

20 November 2009 3	Honvéd	1–2	Debrecen	Budapest
19:00 CET (UTC+1)	Vukmir (yellow card) 60'; Guié 68'; Angoua (yellow card) 77'; Palásthy (yellow card) 83'	Report	Dudu (yellow card) 42'; Leandro (yellow card) 67', (goal) 76'; Bernáth (yellow card) 70'; Czvitkovics (yellow card) 84'; Rudolf 90+1'	Stadium: Bozsik József Stadion; Attendance: 600; Referee: István Vad; Assistant referees: Vencel Tóth II, Balázs Farkas; Fourth official: Balázs Böcskei

27 February 2010 16	Kaposvár	1–0	Honvéd	Kaposvár
14:00 CET (UTC+1)	Stanić (yellow card) 40'; Pes (yellow card) 43'; L. Oláh 61'; Maróti (red card) 89'	Report	Botiș (yellow card) 11'; Diego (red card) 42'; Palásthy (yellow card) 43'; Debreceni (yellow card) 72'; Á. Takács (yellow card) 88'	Stadium: Rákóczi Stadion; Attendance: 3,000; Referee: Ádám Németh; Assistant referees: Balázs Farkas, Zsolt Butkai; Fourth official: Szabolcs Fenyvesi

6 March 2010 17	Honvéd	4–1	MTK	Budapest
14:00 CET (UTC+1)	Dieng 9'; Macko (yellow card) 19'; Botiș 36'; Vaccaro 46'; Coira 74'	Report	Lázok 12' (pen.); Vadnai (yellow card) 49'; Zsidai (yellow card) 62'; Rodenbücher (yellow card) 81'	Stadium: Bozsik József Stadion; Attendance: 1,500; Referee: Tamás Bognár; Assistant referees: Zoltán Kovács, Balázs Huszár; Fourth official: Gyöngyi Gaál

13 March 2010 18	Debrecen	2–1	Honvéd	Debrecen
17:30 CET (UTC+1)	Feczesin 2'; Laczkó (yellow card) 68'; Coulibaly 72', (yellow card) 72'	Report	Guié 24'; Cuerda (yellow card) 79'	Stadium: Oláh Gábor utcai Stadion; Attendance: 3,000; Referee: Sándor Andó-Szabó; Assistant referees: György Ring, Tamás Márkus; Fourth official: Csaba Sándor

20 March 2010 19	Honvéd	0–0	Videoton	Budapest
15:00 CET (UTC+1)	Guié (yellow card) 100'	Report	Elek (yellow card) 35'; Lipták (yellow card) 72'	Stadium: Bozsik József Stadion; Attendance: 2,500; Referee: Zsolt Szabó; Assistant referees: Róbert Kispál, Attila Kelemen; Fourth official: László Varga

27 March 2010 20	Újpest	0–1	Honvéd	Budapest
15:00 CET (UTC+1)	Millar (yellow card) 58'; Korcsmár (yellow card) 70'; Vaskó (yellow card) 90+2'	Report	Debreceni (yellow card) 14'; Diego 51'; Guié (yellow card) 53'; Z. Nagy (yellow card) 66'	Stadium: Szusza Ferenc Stadion; Attendance: 3,247; Referee: Roland Veizer; Assistant referees: Tibor Vámos, Zsolt Márton; Fourth official: Gergő Király

3 April 2010 21	Honvéd	0–0	Győr	Budapest
15:00 CEST (UTC+2)	Macko (yellow card) 63'; Guié (yellow card) 90'	Report	Babić (yellow card) 87'; Kink (yellow card) 90+2'	Stadium: Bozsik József Stadion; Attendance: 1,000; Referee: Ferenc Bede; Assistant referees: Vencel Tóth II, Attila Kelemen; Fourth official: Balázs Berke

10 April 2010 22	Kecskemét	2–2	Honvéd	Kecskemét
16:30 CEST (UTC+2)	Némedi 69' (pen.), (yellow card) 100'; Montvai 72'	Report	Gyagya 41' (o.g.); Bajner (yellow card) 51'; Macko (yellow card) 60'; Moreira (yellow card) 72'; Vaccaro 84'	Stadium: Széktói Stadion; Attendance: 2,200; Referee: Péter Solymosi; Assistant referees: Gábor Takács, Balázs Kiss; Fourth official: Gábor Barna

17 April 2010 23	Honvéd	4–2	Diósgyőr	Budapest
16:30 CEST (UTC+2)	Guié 4'; Bajner 13'; Diego 17' (pen.), 25'; Vukmir (yellow card) 53'; Z. Nagy (yellow card) 75'	Report	Bajzát 12', 30', (yellow card) 52'; Balajti (yellow card) 23'; Vukadinović (yellow card) 68'; Jeknić (yellow card) 76'	Stadium: Bozsik József Stadion; Attendance: 2,000; Referee: Viktor Kassai; Assistant referees: Gábor Erős, Zsolt Szpisják; Fourth official: Gábor Fajkusz

24 April 2010 24	Pápa	0–3	Honvéd	Pápa
17:00 CEST (UTC+2)	Bali (red card) 14'; A. Farkas (yellow card) 44'; Gyömbér (yellow card) 53'; Bárányos (yellow card) 77'; Sarus (yellow card) 90'	Report	Debreceni (yellow card) 8'; Guié 44'; Diego 63'; Akassou (yellow card) 75'; Bajner 83'	Stadium: Perutz Stadion; Attendance: 2,500; Referee: Ádám Farkas; Assistant referees: Attila Kelemen, Gyula Fehér; Fourth official: Dániel Becséri

1 May 2010 25	Vasas	2–2	Honvéd	Budapest
17:30 CEST (UTC+2)	Bakos 7'; Gá. Kovács (yellow card) 27'; Pavičević (yellow card) 40'; Benounes 80'	Report	Cuerda 25'; Hajdú 28'	Stadium: Illovszky Rudolf Stadion; Attendance: 2,500; Referee: Zsolt Szabó; Assistant referees: Róbert Kispál, Dr. Zsolt Varga; Fourth official: László Varga

5 May 2010 26	Honvéd	0–0	Haladás	Budapest
18:00 CEST (UTC+2)	Akassou (yellow card) 32'	Report	Schimmer (yellow card) 54'; Guzmics (yellow card) 61'; P. Tóth (yellow card) 64'	Stadium: Bozsik József Stadion; Attendance: 1,500; Referee: János Takács; Assistant referees: László Viszokai, Lajos L. Tóth; Fourth official: Gergely Szőts

8 May 2010 27	Zalaegerszeg	0–1	Honvéd	Zalaegerszeg
17:30 CEST (UTC+2)	Miljatovič (yellow card) 59'; Ge. Kovács (yellow card) 85'; Kocsárdi (yellow card) 90+2'	Report	Panikvar 13' (o.g.); Debreceni (yellow card) 29'; Diego (yellow card) 45'; Botiș (yellow card) 50'; Coira (yellow card) 73'; Z. Nagy (yellow card) 77'	Stadium: ZTE Arena; Attendance: 2,338; Referee: Ferenc Bede; Assistant referees: Tibor Vámos, Zsolt Márton; Fourth official: Gábor Barna

15 May 2010 28	Honvéd	1–1	Nyíregyháza	Budapest
18:00 CEST (UTC+2)	Cuerda 88'; Vaccaro (yellow card) 90+1'	Report	Miskolczi (yellow card) 31'; Hurt (yellow card) 53'; Struhár 90'	Stadium: Bozsik József Stadion; Attendance: 800; Referee: István Vad; Assistant referees: Balázs Farkas, Zsolt Butkai; Fourth official: Gyöngyi Gaál

19 May 2010 29	Paks	2–1	Honvéd	Paks
18:00 CEST (UTC+2)	T. Kiss 5'; Böde 44', (yellow card) 66'; Völgyi (yellow card) 80'; Fiola (yellow card) 81'; Nikolov (yellow card) 85'	Report	Dieng (yellow card) 72'; Debreceni (yellow card) 75'; Vaccaro 82' (pen.); Akassou (yellow card) 87'; Yanchuk (yellow card) 88'	Stadium: Fehérvári úti Stadion; Attendance: 500; Referee: Viktor Kassai; Assistant referees: Gábor Erős, Tibor Vígh; Fourth official: Katalin Kulcsár

22 May 2010 30	Honvéd	2–0	Ferencváros	Budapest
17:30 CEST (UTC+2)	Moreira (yellow card) 10'; Coira 51'; Vaccaro (penalty missed) 79', 79'; Zsolnai (yellow card) 83'	Report	Lipcsei (yellow card) 30'; Stockley (yellow card) 51'; Csizmadia (yellow card) 53'; Zo. Balog (yellow card) 87'	Stadium: Bozsik József Stadion; Attendance: 4,000; Referee: Roland Veizer; Assistant referees: Vencel Tóth II, Péter Berettyán; Fourth official: Tibor Gyarmati II

=== Magyar Kupa ===
7 October 2009 Round of 32	Dunakanyar-Vác	0–2	Honvéd	Vác
15:00 CEST (UTC+2)	Gulyás (yellow card) 59'; Benke (yellow card) 80'; Albert (yellow card) 88'	Report	Bajner 14', 81'	Stadium: Ligeti Stadion; Attendance: 300; Referee: János Takács; Assistant referees: Lajos L. Tóth, Tamás Márkus

==== Round of 16 ====
20 October 2009 First leg	Szolnok	4–1	Honvéd	Szolnok
14:30 CEST (UTC+2)	Z. Nagy 11' (o.g.); Csehi 13'; Hevesi-Tóth 40'; M. Tóth 65'; Belényesi (red card) 80'; Bardi (yellow card) 90+1'	Report	Cséke (yellow card) 19'; Hajdú (yellow card) 19'; Guié 41'; Macko (yellow card) 89'	Stadium: Tiszaligeti Stadion; Attendance: 500; Referee: Ádám Németh; Assistant referees: Balázs Farkas, Gábor Kormányos II

27 October 2009 Second leg	Honvéd	3–0 ((a) 4–4 agg.)	Szolnok	Budapest
18:00 CET (UTC+1)	Moreira (yellow card) 4'; Diego 7'; Vukmir (yellow card) 56'; Angoua (red card) 59'; Guié 64'; Macko 87'; Hajdú (yellow card) 90+2'	Report	Pető (yellow card) 21'; M. Tóth (yellow card) 48'; Kotula (yellow card) 65'; G. Hegedűs (red card) 68'	Stadium: Bozsik József Stadion; Attendance: 800; Referee: Ádám Farkas; Assistant referees: Attila Kelemen, János Demeter
Note: 4–4 on aggregate. Honvéd won on away goals.

==== Quarter-finals ====
17 November 2009 First leg	Honvéd	1–1	Győr	Budapest
18:00 CET (UTC+1)	Moreira 65'; Palásthy (yellow card) 85'	Report	Fehér (yellow card) 44'; Aleksidze 70', (yellow card) 84'; Šupić (yellow card) 87'; Józsi (yellow card) 90+3'	Stadium: Bozsik József Stadion; Attendance: 800; Referee: Zsolt Szabó; Assistant referees: Róbert Kispál, Tibor Vígh

25 November 2009 Second leg	Győr	0–1 (1–2 agg.)	Honvéd	Győr
17:00 CET (UTC+1)	Kink (yellow card) 23'; Babić (yellow card) 35'; Stanišić (yellow card) 64'; Fehér (yellow card) 82'	Report	Diego 9'; Vukmir (yellow card) 22'; Macko (yellow card) 32'; Hajdú (yellow card) 59'	Stadium: ETO Park; Attendance: 1,000; Referee: Péter Solymosi; Assistant referees: Gábor Erős, Zsolt Butkai
Note: Honvéd won 2–1 on aggregate.

==== Semi-finals ====
23 March 2010 First leg	Honvéd	1–1	Debrecen	Budapest
18:00 CET (UTC+1)	Ad. Horváth (yellow card) 45'; Vukmir (yellow card) 66'; Guié 88'	Report	Z. Kiss I (yellow card) 80'; P. Szilágyi 81'	Stadium: Bozsik József Stadion; Attendance: 1,000; Referee: Zoltán Iványi; Assistant referees: István Albert, János Medovarszki; Fourth official: József Erdős

13 April 2010 Second leg	Debrecen	2–1 (3–2 agg.)	Honvéd	Debrecen
18:00 CEST (UTC+2)	Mbengono 34'; Bodnár (yellow card) 58'; Laczkó 85', (yellow card) 90'; N. Mészáros (yellow card) 87'	Report	Macko (yellow card) 39'; Palásthy (yellow card) 49'; Akassou (yellow card) 53'; Guié 83'; Tavars (yellow card) 90'	Stadium: Oláh Gábor utcai Stadion; Attendance: 3,000; Referee: István Vad; Assistant referees: György Ring, Balázs Farkas; Fourth official: Gergő Janitz
Note: Debrecen won 3–2 on aggregate.

=== Ligakupa ===
==== Second group stage ====
Pos	Team	Pld	W	D	L	GF	GA	GD	Pts	Qualification	DEB	VID	HON	NYI
1	Debrecen	6	5	1	0	17	4	+13	16	Advance to final	—	2–2	2–1	5–1
2	Videoton	6	3	2	1	7	5	+2	11		0–2	—	2–0	1–0
3	Honvéd	6	1	2	3	8	8	0	5		0–2	1–1	—	1–1
4	Nyíregyháza	6	0	1	5	2	17	−15	1		0–4	0–1	0–5	—

Source: Hungarian Football Federation

16 February 2010 1	Honvéd	1–1	Nyíregyháza	Budapest
14:00 CET (UTC+1)	Vukmir (yellow card) 87'; Palásthy 90+2'	Report	Davidov (yellow card) 8', (goal) 47'; Miskolczi (yellow card) 41'; Andorka (yellow card) 88'	Stadium: Bozsik József Stadion; Attendance: 200; Referee: István Vad; Assistant referees: Tibor Vígh, János Agócs

23 February 2010 2	Videoton	2–0	Honvéd	Székesfehérvár
14:30 CET (UTC+1)	Elek (yellow card) 23'; Milanović (red card) 31'; G. Horváth II 43'; B. Farkas (yellow card) 73'; Sándor 78'	Report	Macko (yellow card) 43'; Botiș (yellow card) 70'	Stadium: Sóstói Stadion; Attendance: 300; Referee: Szabolcs Szilasi; Assistant referees: Oszkár Lémon, Balázs Huszár

10 March 2010 3	Debrecen	2–1	Honvéd	Debrecen
18:00 CET (UTC+1)	Rezes 2'; Lucas (yellow card) 44'; Bodnár 60'	Report	Palásthy 40'	Stadium: Oláh Gábor utcai Stadion; Attendance: 200; Referee: József Berger; Assistant referees: Attila Forgács, Lajos L. Tóth

17 March 2010 4	Nyíregyháza	0–5	Honvéd	Nyíregyháza
13:00 CET (UTC+1)		Report	Freud 8', 43'; Bojtor 32', 78'; Frizoni 89'	Stadium: Városi Stadion; Attendance: 200; Referee: Gyöngyi Gaál; Assistant referees: Zsolt Márton, Zsolt Butkai

31 March 2010 5	Honvéd	1–1	Videoton	Budapest
16:00 CEST (UTC+2)	Palásthy 71'; Sós (yellow card) 79'	Report	Lelkes 13'; Sötét (red card) 55'	Stadium: Bozsik József Stadion; Attendance: 100; Referee: Mohamed (Qatar); Assistant referees: G. Ring (Hungary), Rashid (Qatar)

4 April 2010 6	Honvéd	0–2	Debrecen	Budapest
14:00 CEST (UTC+2)	Lengyel (yellow card) 20'; Vernes (yellow card) 25'	Report	Angyal 49'; Bíró 83'	Stadium: Bozsik József Stadion; Attendance: 100; Referee: Al-Doszari (Qatar); Assistant referees: R. Kispál (Hungary), Altavadi (Qatar)

=== UEFA Europa League ===
==== Qualifying rounds ====
===== Third qualifying round =====
30 July 2009 First leg	Fenerbahçe (Turkey)	5–1	(Hungary) Honvéd	Istanbul, Turkey
21:45 EEST (UTC+3)	Roberto Carlos 13'; Güiza 30', 40', 61'; Alex 69'	Report	Angoua (yellow card) 16'; Zsolnai 78'	Stadium: Şükrü Saracoğlu Stadium; Attendance: 28,099; Referee: Knut Kircher (Germany); Assistant referees: Jan-Hendrik Salver (Germany), Wolfgang Walz (Germany); Fourth official: Markus Schmidt (Germany)

6 August 2009 Second leg	Honvéd (Hungary)	1–1 (2–6 agg.)	(Turkey) Fenerbahçe	Budapest, Hungary
20:00 CEST (UTC+2)	Debreceni (yellow card) 15'; Fritz 86'	Report	Santos 9'; Bilica (red card) 31'	Stadium: Bozsik József Stadion; Attendance: 450; Referee: Paul Allaerts (Belgium); Assistant referees: Dirk Gilon (Belgium), Gregory Crotteu (Belgium); Fourth official: Stéphane Breda (Belgium)
Note: Fenerbahçe won 6–2 on aggregate.
