= László Bojtor =

Hungarian footballer (born 1985)

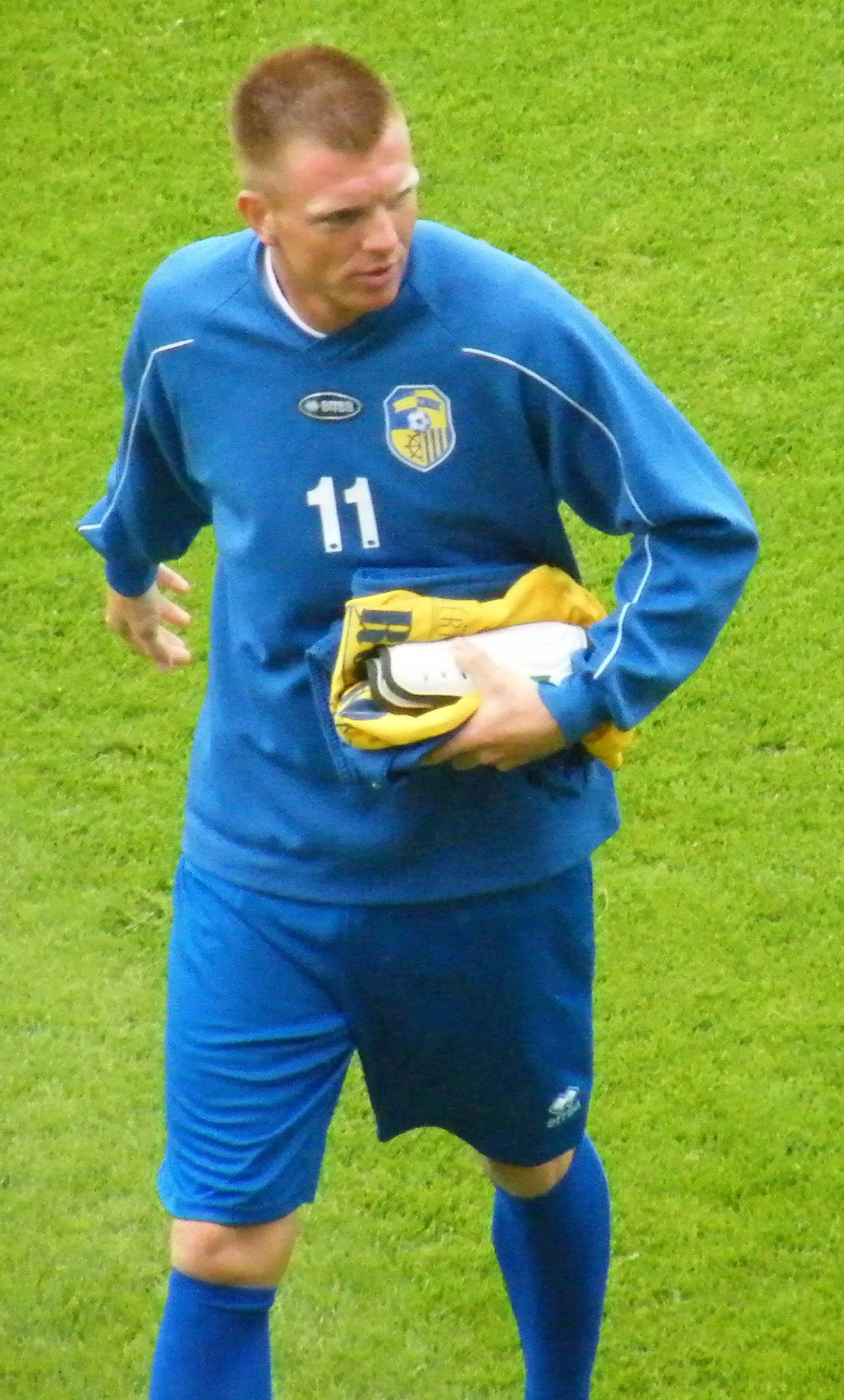
- Bojtor with Siófok in 2009

Personal information
- Full name: László Balázs Bojtor
- Date of birth: 17 September 1985 (age 41)
- Place of birth: Budapest, Hungary
- Height: 1.93 m (6 ft 4 in)
- Positions: Striker; midfielder

Youth career
- 1999–2004: Honvéd

Senior career*
Years	Team	Apps	(Gls)
2004–2011	Honvéd	30	(1)
2006–2007	→ Felcsút (loan)	21	(1)
2007–2010	Honvéd II	40	(6)
2008–2009	→ Siófok (loan)	17	(1)
2008–2009	→ Siófok II (loan)	3	(1)
2011	Vecsés	13	(2)
2011–2012	Eger	19	(2)
2012–2014	Rákospalota	40	(8)
2014	Pamhagen	11	(8)
2014–2015	Rákosmente	29	(6)
2015–2016	Dorog	22	(3)
2016–2017	Jászberény	30	(6)
2017–2018	Rákosmente	3	(0)
2018	Vecsés	11	(1)
2018–2019	Biatorbágy	17	(8)
2019–2020	Páty	13	(10)
Total		308	(56)
- * Club domestic league appearances and goals

László Balázs Bojtor (born 17 September 1985) is a Hungarian former professional footballer who played as a striker and midfielder.

== Career ==
On 28 August 2008, Bojtor joined Nemzeti Bajnokság I club Siófok on loan until the end of the 2008–09 season.

== Career statistics ==
Appearances and goals by club, season and competition
Club	Season	League			National cup (Note: Includes Magyar Kupa)		League cup (Note: Includes Ligakupa)		Europe		Other		Total	
Club	Season	Division	Apps	Goals	Apps	Goals	Apps	Goals	Apps	Goals	Apps	Goals	Apps	Goals
Honvéd	2003–04	Nemzeti Bajnokság II	1	0	0	0	—		—		—		1	0
Honvéd	2004–05	Nemzeti Bajnokság I	12	0	2	0	—		3 (Note: Appearances in UEFA Cup)	0	—		17	0
Honvéd	2005–06	Nemzeti Bajnokság I	4	0	3	1	—		—		—		7	1
Honvéd	2007–08	Nemzeti Bajnokság I	0	0	1	0	5	0	—		—		6	0
Honvéd	2008–09	Nemzeti Bajnokság I	0	0	—		—		4 (Note: Appearances in UEFA Intertoto Cup)	2	—		4	2
Honvéd	2009–10	Nemzeti Bajnokság I	4	0	1	0	5	2	—		—		10	2
Honvéd	2010–11	Nemzeti Bajnokság I	9	1	3	0	4	0	—		—		16	1
Honvéd	Total		30	1	10	1	14	2	7	2	—		61	6
Felcsút (loan)	2005–06	Nemzeti Bajnokság II	11	1	—		—		—		—		11	1
Felcsút (loan)	2006–07	Nemzeti Bajnokság II	10	0	—		—		—		—		10	0
Felcsút (loan)	Total		21	1	—		—		—		—		21	1
Honvéd II	2007–08	Nemzeti Bajnokság III	27	3	—		—		—		—		27	3
Honvéd II	2008–09	Nemzeti Bajnokság III	3	1	—		—		—		—		3	1
Honvéd II	2009–10	Nemzeti Bajnokság II	8	1	—		—		—		—		8	1
Honvéd II	2010–11	Nemzeti Bajnokság II	2	1	—		—		—		—		2	1
Honvéd II	Total		40	6	—		—		—		—		40	6
Siófok (loan)	2008–09	Nemzeti Bajnokság I	17	1	5	0	7	0	—		—		29	1
Siófok II (loan)	2008–09	Nemzeti Bajnokság III	3	1	—		—		—		—		3	1
Vecsés	2010–11	Nemzeti Bajnokság II	13	2	—		—		—		—		13	2
Eger	2011–12	Nemzeti Bajnokság II	19	2	2	1	—		—		—		21	3
Rákospalota	2012–13	Nemzeti Bajnokság III	26	5	3	1	—		—		4 (Note: Two appearances and two goals in Magyar Kupa qualifying rounds, two appearances in Nemzeti Bajnokság III relegation play-offs)	2	33	8
Rákospalota	2013–14	Nemzeti Bajnokság III	14	3	—		—		—		—		14	3
Rákospalota	Total		40	8	3	1	—		—		4	2	47	11
Pamhagen	2013–14	2. Klasse Nord	11	8	—		—		—		—		11	8
Rákosmente	2014–15	Nemzeti Bajnokság III	29	6	—		—		—		—		29	6
Dorog	2015–16	Nemzeti Bajnokság III	22	3	1	0	—		—		—		23	3
Jászberény	2016–17	Nemzeti Bajnokság III	30	6	2	0	—		—		—		32	6
Rákosmente	2017–18	Nemzeti Bajnokság III	3	0	—		—		—		—		3	0
Vecsés	2017–18	Nemzeti Bajnokság III	11	1	—		—		—		—		11	1
Biatorbágy	2018–19	Megyei Bajnokság I	17	8	2	1	—		—		3 (Note: Two appearances in Magyar Kupa qualifying rounds, one appearance and one goal in Pest Megyei Kupa)	1	22	10
Páty	2019–20	Megyei Bajnokság III	13	10	—		—		—		—		13	10
Career total			308	56	25	4	21	2	7	2	7	3	368	67

== Honours ==
Honvéd

- Nemzeti Bajnokság II: 2003–04
- Magyar Kupa runner-up: 2007–08

Honvéd II

- Nemzeti Bajnokság III – Alföld: 2008–09

Eger

- Nemzeti Bajnokság II – East: 2011–12
