= Tomislav Labudović =

Croatian footballer

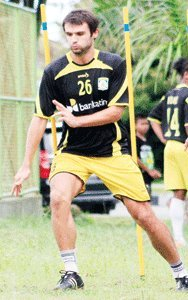
- Labudović during training for Persiba Balikpapan

Personal information
- Date of birth: 25 October 1985 (age 41)
- Place of birth: Zagreb, Croatia
- Height: 1.84 m (6 ft 0 in)
- Position: Central defender

Youth career
- NK Zagreb

Senior career*
Years	Team	Apps	(Gls)
2004–2009	NK Zagreb	120	(5)
2008–2009	→ Šibenik (loan)	16	(0)
2009	Croatia Sesvete	18	(1)
2010	Inter Zaprešic	8	(0)
2010	Slaven Belupo	6	(0)
2011	Budapest Honvéd	3	(0)
2012–2013	Persiba Balikpapan	27	(1)
2013–2014	Pomorac	24	(2)
2014–2015	Gorica	34	(1)
2016–2019	SV 1910 Neuhof	77	(5)

International career
2001	Croatia U17	5	
- Croatia U19
2005–2006	Croatia U21	11	
- * Club domestic league appearances and goals as of 1 October 2022

Tomislav Labudović (born 25 October 1985) is a Croatian footballer who plays as a central defender.

== Club career ==
Labudović started his football career at NK Zagreb in the Croatian First Division.

Between 2004 and 2009, under the guidance of Miroslav Blažević and Mile Petković, he established himself as a young player and leader of the game, and enrolled in 125 appearances for Croatian First Division with his 23 years.

During 2004–05 season he scored five goals in five games in a row and became a standard player in "Player of the round2.

In summer 2008, NK Zagreb refused an offer from Turkish club MKE Ankaragücü and Israeli club FC Ashdod and offered Labudović a new contract which he refused. The club put him to the bench. In winter 2009, Labudović was loaned out to HNK Šibenik (Croatian First Division) playing 10 matches.

On 31 August 2009, last day of the transfer window, Labudović terminated his contract with NK Zagreb and Croatia Sesvete (Croatian First Division), where he played eight games. He left the club at the end of the year because of the club's financial collapse. He was acquitted for the second time for alleged bribery of two traffic officers after a traffic offence in February 2009.

In 2010, he joined NK Inter Zaprešić where he played at a high level eight matches under the guidance of coach Ilija Lončarević, and he was again standard in "Player of the round".

In 2011, he joined Indonesian outfit Persiba Balikpapan on a one-year contract for season 2011–12. Labudović played 30 matches and scored one goal. In 2013, he moved to NK Pomorac Kostrena, where he played 25 matches and scored 2 goals. Before the season 2014/2015, he signed for HNK Gorica.
