= Karim Rouani =

French footballer (born 1982)

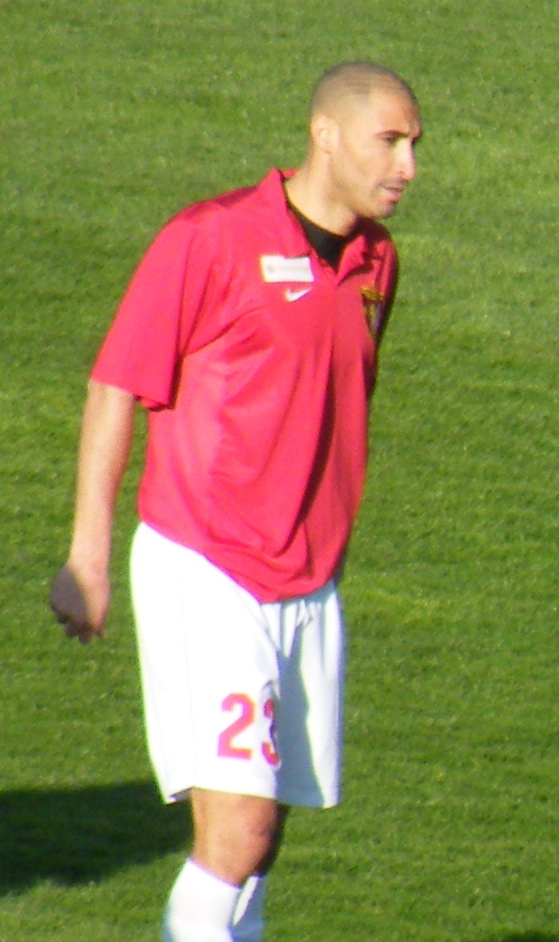
- Rouani in 2011

Personal information
- Date of birth: 8 March 1982 (age 44)
- Place of birth: Bordeaux, France
- Position: Striker

Youth career
- 2000–2002: Bordeaux

Senior career*
Years	Team	Apps	(Gls)
2002–2004	FCÉ Mérignac Arlac		
2004–2005	Langon-Castets		
2005–2006	Biscarosse Olympique Football		
2006–2007	Sprimont Comblain Sport	28	(11)
2007–2008	R.O.C. de Charleroi-Marchienne	27	(3)
2008–2009	→ Olympique Safi (loan)		
2009–2010	Chaves	7	(0)
2010–2011	Budapest Honvéd	17	(2)
2012	BEC Tero Sasana		
2013	Perak FA		
2013–2014	Stuttgarter Kickers	0	(0)
- * Club domestic league appearances and goals

Karim Rouani (born 8 March 1982) is a French former professional footballer who played as a striker.

== Career ==
Rouani was born in Bordeaux.

He left in January 2009 R.O.C. de Charleroi-Marchienne and moved to Moroccan side Olympique Safi.

He signed for Malaysian team Perak FA, a team in the Malaysia Super League for the 2013 season. He made his debut with Perak in February, in a league game against Terengganu FA. signed for Stuttgarter Kickers four months later.
