= Alfi Conteh-Lacalle =

Sierra Leonean football manager

Alfi Conteh
Personal information
- Full name: Alfi Conteh-Lacalle
- Birth name: Alfi Conteh Lacalle (Note: In this Spanish name, the first or paternal surname is Conteh and the second or maternal family name is Lacalle.)
- Date of birth: 18 January 1985 (age 41)
- Place of birth: Barcelona, Spain
- Height: 1.80 m (5 ft 11 in)
- Position: Centre forward

Youth career
- 1995–2003: Barcelona

Senior career*
Years	Team	Apps	(Gls)
2003	Barcelona C	4	(2)
2003–2005	Barcelona B	9	(1)
2006	Gavà	17	(3)
2009	Kavala	2	(1)
2010	Nyíregyháza Spartacus	3	(0)
2010	Budapest Honvéd	7	(0)
2011–2012	Terrassa	21	(10)
2013	Kallon	8	(4)
2014–2015	Lusitanos	2	(2)
2015–2016	Sant Julia	15	(7)
2016	Eiger IL	9	(8)
2017	Selfoss	9	(2)
2017–2018	Proodeftiki	1	(0)
2018	Dénia	7	(0)
2019	Cartagena	7	(0)
2020	Louisiana Krewe	0	(0)
2020–2021	Horta	11	(1)
2021–2022	Ordino	9	(4)
2022	Louisiana Krewe	11	(8)
Total		152	(53)

International career^{‡}
2004	Spain U19	4	(0)
2008	Sierra Leone	1	(0)
- * Club domestic league appearances and goals as of 29 October 2022 ‡ National team caps and goals as of 30 June 2012

Alfi Conteh-Lacalle (born 18 January 1985) is a football manager and former professional player who played a forward. Born in Spain, he represented Sierra Leone at international level.

== Early life ==
Conteh was born in Barcelona to a Sierra Leonean father and a Spanish mother.

== Club career ==
Conteh has played for Nyíregyháza Spartacus FC and Budapest Honvéd FC in Hungary.

== International career ==
Conteh made his senior debut for Sierra Leone on 7 June 2008 as a 75th-minute substitution in a 1–0 home loss to Nigeria during the 2010 FIFA World Cup qualification.
