= Lukáš Zelenka =

Czech footballer (born 1979)

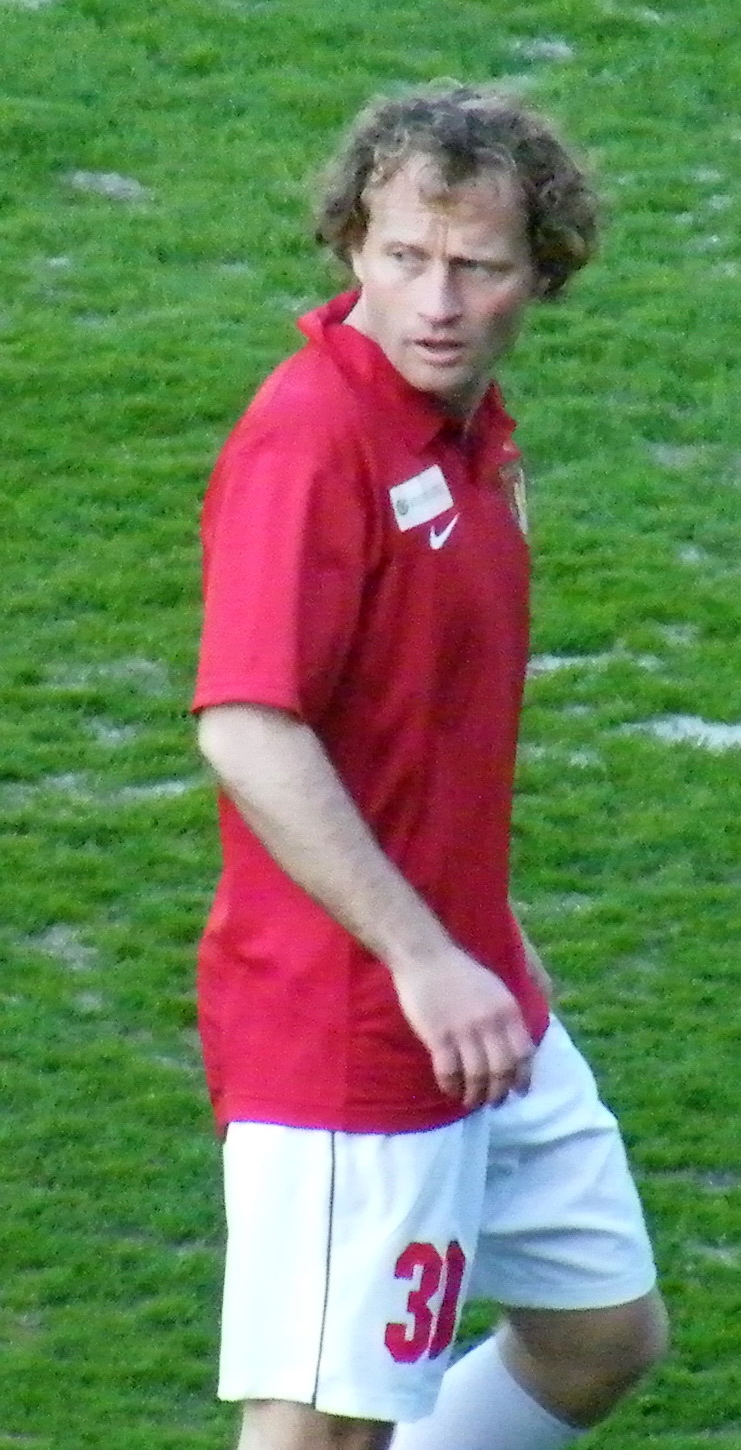

Personal information
- Date of birth: 5 October 1979 (age 47)
- Place of birth: Prague, Czechoslovakia
- Height: 1.75 m (5 ft 9 in)
- Position: Midfielder

Youth career
- 1986–1997: Sparta Prague

Senior career*
Years	Team	Apps	(Gls)
1998–1999	R.S.C. Anderlecht	3	(0)
1999–2001	Westerlo	69	(7)
2001–2005	Sparta Prague	114	(19)
2006–2007	Manisaspor	49	(8)
2008–2009	Westerlo	38	(3)
2009–2010	1. FC Slovácko	17	(2)
2011–2012	Budapest Honvéd	19	(2)
2012–2016	1. SK Prostějov	91	(21)

International career
2000–2002	Czech Republic U21	18	(3)
2005	Czech Republic	3	(0)
Medal record
Men's football
Representing Czech Republic
UEFA European Under-21 Championship
Winner	2002 Switzerland
- * Club domestic league appearances and goals

Lukáš Zelenka (born 5 October 1979) is a Czech former professional footballer who played as a midfielder. At international level, he made three appearances for the Czech Republic national team.

In November 2004, Zelenka scored against Manchester United at Old Trafford for Sparta in the Champions League upon striding into the box and slotting home after a slick passing move to draw a goal back for Sparta making it 2–1. However, Manchester United went on to complete a 4–1 victory.

== Honours ==
Westerlo

- Belgian Cup: 2000-01

Sparta Prague

- Czech First League: 2002–03
- Czech Cup: 2003–04

Czech Republic U21

- UEFA European Under-21 Championship: 2002
