= Balázs Sarus =

Hungarian footballer

Personal information
- Full name: Balázs Sarus
- Date of birth: 9 December 1988 (age 37)
- Place of birth: Győr, Hungary
- Height: 1.72 m (5 ft 7 1/2 in)
- Position: Midfielder

Team information
- Current team: Kecskeméti TE
- Number: 20

Youth career
- 2002–2003: Győri ETO FC
- 2003–2004: Gyirmót SE
- 2004–2008: Győri ETO FC

Senior career*
Years	Team	Apps	(Gls)
2008–2009	Győri ETO FC	0	(0)
2008–2009	→ Integrál-DAC (loan)	10	(0)
2009–2010	Lombard-Pápa TFC	13	(0)
2010–2012	Nyíregyháza Spartacus	0	(0)
2011	→ Balmazújvárosi FC (loan)	0	(0)
2012–	Kecskeméti TE	0	(0)
- * Club domestic league appearances and goals as of 11 September 2011

Balázs Sarus (born 9 December 1988 in Győr) is a Hungarian football player who currently plays for Kecskeméti TE.
