= Haman Sadjo =

Cameroonian footballer

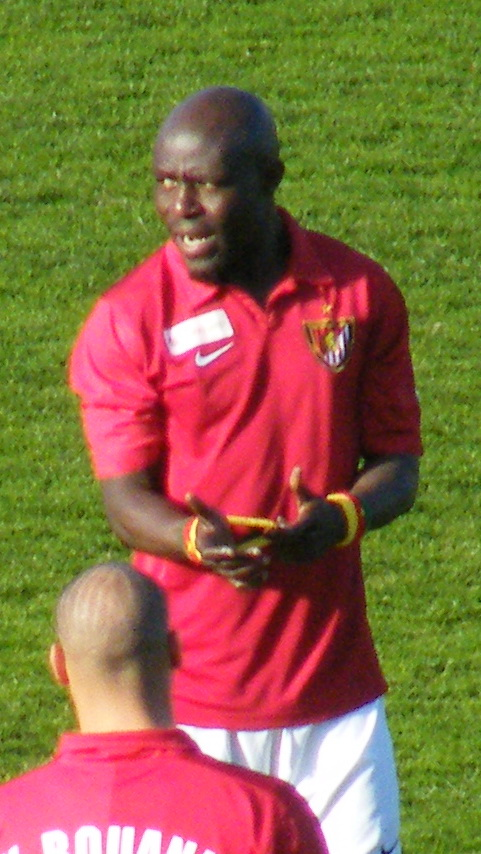

Personal information
- Full name: Sadjo Haman
- Date of birth: 28 November 1984 (age 41)
- Place of birth: Ngaoundere, Cameroon
- Height: 1.74 m (5 ft 9 in)
- Position: Defender

Senior career*
Years	Team	Apps	(Gls)
2003–2004	Cotonsport Garoua	?	(?)
2005–2010	Sahel FC	?	(?)
2006	→ Association Salé (loan)	?	(?)
2007	→ Diósgyőri VTK (loan)	12	(1)
2007–2008	→ Újpest FC (loan)	23	(2)
2008–2009	→ FC Vaduz (loan)	15	(0)
2010	Diósgyőri VTK	11	(0)
2010–2011	Budapest Honvéd FC	20	(1)
2011–2012	Szigetszentmiklósi TK	12	(2)
2012–2013	Akzhayik	46	(6)
2014	Al-Merrikh		
2016	VLS Veszprém		

International career^{‡}
2008–2011	Cameroon	2	(0)
- * Club domestic league appearances and goals as of 1 October 2015 ‡ National team caps and goals as of 9 February 2011

Haman Sadjo (born 28 November 1984, in Ngaoundere) is a Cameroonian footballer who last played for Al-Merrikh in the Sudan Premier League.

== International ==
He won his first cap for Cameroon national football team in the 2010 World Cup Qualification match against Tanzania on 21 June 2008.
