= Peter Fieber =

Slovak footballer and manager

Personal information
- Date of birth: 16 May 1964 (age 62)
- Place of birth: Bratislava, Czechoslovakia
- Height: 1.80 m (5 ft 11 in)
- Position: Defender

Youth career
- 1975–1983: Inter Bratislava

Senior career*
Years	Team	Apps	(Gls)
1983–1984	Dukla Banská Bystrica	17	(0)
1984–1986	Inter Bratislava	56	(2)
1986–1990	DAC Dunajská Streda	117	(11)
1991	K. Beerschot VAV		
1991–1993	Racing Genk		
1993–1996	DAC Dunajská Streda	74	(12)
1996–1997	Artmedia Petržalka		
1998	SV Meppen	14	(0)

International career
1988	Czechoslovakia	3	(0)
1990	Czechoslovakia B	1	(0)
1994	Slovakia	1	(0)

Managerial career
- 2002: FK SH Senica
- 2003: KFC Komárno
- 2004: Rapid Bratislava
- 2005: DAC Dunajská Streda
- 2006: FC Senec (assistant)
- 2007: Debreceni VSC (assistant)
- 2008: DAC Dunajská Streda
- 2008: Slovan Galanta
- 2009: TJ Gabčíkovo
- 2009: Inter Bratislava
- 2009–2010: MFK Petržalka
- 2015–2016: OFK Dunajská Lužná
- 2017–: Persika Karawang
- * Club domestic league appearances and goals

Peter Fieber (born 16 May 1964) is a Slovak football player and later a football manager. He played for Dukla Banská Bystrica, Inter Bratislava, DAC Dunajská Streda, Artmedia Petržalka, Racing Genk and SV Meppen.

== Biography ==
Fieber was part of the Dunajská Streda side which won the 1986–87 Czechoslovak Cup. A member of Czechoslovakia squad at the 1990 FIFA World Cup, Fieber earned three appearances for Czechoslovakia and one cap for the newly-established Slovakia.

His son, born in 1989 and also named Peter Fieber, was a footballer too. He played for Inter Bratislava between 2008 and 09, Petržalka from 2009, and Budapest Honvéd leaving in 2011.
