= György Cséke =

Hungarian footballer (born 1983)

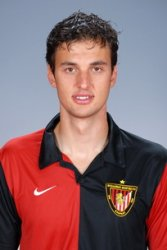

Personal information
- Full name: György Cséke
- Date of birth: 7 April 1983 (age 43)
- Place of birth: Nyíregyháza, Hungary
- Height: 1.95 m (6 ft 5 in)
- Position: Defender

Senior career*
Years	Team	Apps	(Gls)
2005–2006	Bőcs KSC	10	(2)
2006–2007	Tuzsér SE	22	(4)
2007–2008	Nyíregyháza Spartacus	17	(1)
2008–2009	Bőcs KSC	26	(8)
2009–2011	Budapest Honvéd FC	23	(3)
2011–2012	Nyíregyháza Spartacus	20	(1)
2012–2014	Cigánd SE	12	(2)
2014–2016	Storm F.C.	19	(0)
- * Club domestic league appearances and goals as of 22 May 2011

György Cséke (born 7 April 1983 in Nyíregyháza) is a Hungarian football player who retired in 2016. He played his last professional game with a Fort Lauderdale-based NPSL club Storm FC. against Jacksonville United. He currently works as a private soccer coach in Florida and is ranked 1st in the state.

== Club career ==
=== Nyíregyháza Spartacus FC ===
He made his debut on 4 September 2007 against ETO Győr FC in a match that ended 1–0.

=== Budapest Honved ===
He made his debut on 19 September 2009 against Diósgyőri VTK in a match that ended 2–1.

=== Storm FC ===
He made his debut in 2014 in a match against Miami United FC that ended in a 2- 4 loss.

== Club honours ==
=== Budapest Honvéd FC ===
- Hungarian Super Cup:
  - Runners-up: 2009
