= Bálint Bajner =

Hungarian footballer (born 1990)

Personal information
- Full name: Bálint Marcell Bajner
- Date of birth: 18 November 1990 (age 36)
- Place of birth: Szombathely, Hungary
- Height: 1.97 m (6 ft 6 in)
- Position: Striker

Team information
- Current team: Episkopi

Youth career
- Haladás
- 2002–2006: FC Sopron

Senior career*
Years	Team	Apps	(Gls)
2006–2007	FC Sopron	1	(0)
2007–2010	Liberty Oradea	25	(7)
2008–2009	→ West Ham United (loan)	0	(0)
2009–2010	→ Budapest Honvéd (loan)	13	(3)
2010–2011	Budapest Honvéd	12	(4)
2011–2012	Sulmona	18	(11)
2012–2014	Borussia Dortmund	1	(0)
2012–2014	Borussia Dortmund II	52	(9)
2014–2015	Ipswich Town	5	(0)
2015	Notts County	19	(3)
2015–2016	Paks	14	(1)
2016	Modena	16	(1)
2018	Borussia Dortmund II	13	(1)
2020–2021	Pécs	9	(0)
2024	Haladás	0	(0)
2024–	Episkopi	9	(6)

International career
2008–2009	Hungary U19	4	(3)
- * Club domestic league appearances and goals as of 17:08, 23 October 2024 (UTC)

Bálint Bajner (born 18 November 1990) is a Hungarian professional footballer who plays as a forward for Episkopi.

== Club career ==
Bajner was born in Szombathely.

=== West Ham United ===
Bajner joined West Ham United in July 2008 on a season long loan. He returned to Liberty Oradea at the end of the 2008–09 season as West Ham decided not to take up the option of a permanent transfer when his loan ended.

=== Sulmona Calcio ===
On 14 October 2011, Bajner joined Sulmona Calcio 1921 in the Italian "Eccellenza Abruzzo" division and played his first match at Sulmona's Stadio Francesco Pallozzi on 16 October 2011 against Real San Salvo. Sulmona Calcio 1921 won 1–0. On 23 October 2011, Bajner scored his first goal for the "white-reds" in a 1–1 draw against Mosciano.

=== Borussia Dortmund ===
On 1 September 2012, Bajner transferred to Borussia Dortmund II. He scored his first goal against Chemnitzer FC on 7 October 2012.

On 24 February 2013, he made his Bundesliga debut for Borussia's first team, coming on as a substitute in an away game at Borussia Mönchengladbach in the 71st minute.

On 8 January 2013, Bajner scored a goal in a training match against Albacete Balompié. The match ended with a 3–1 victory for Borussia Dortmund.

In the summer of 2014, Bajner attended a training session of Hungarian League club Ferencváros.

=== Ipswich Town ===
On 30 July 2014, Bajner signed a two-year contract with Ipswich Town. Bajner made his debut on 9 August 2014 in a 2–1 home win against Fulham. Ipswich manager, Mick McCarthy admitted that during the early season Bajner had found playing in the Championship "tough". He played in several games throughout August and September and made his last league appearance in a 3–1 away defeat by Cardiff City on 21 October 2014. His only other game for Ipswich came on 14 January 2015 in a 1–0 home defeat by Southampton in the FA Cup. He made seven appearances for the club, five in the league and one in both the FA Cup and the League Cup before being transferred in January 2015.

=== Notts County ===
On 20 January 2015, Bajner was released by Ipswich. He signed for Notts County on the same day, on a contract until the end of season. Also on the same day he made his debut in a 0–0 draw against Doncaster Rovers. Assistant manager Greg Abbott described Bajner as being an "ideal signing" for Notts County. His signing provoked a stream of messages from Hungary on Notts County's Facebook page, which led to the whole country being blocked from interacting with the page. On 10 February 2015, Bajner scored his first goal for Notts County against Leyton Orient in a 0–1 away win.

=== Paks ===
On 8 October 2015, Bajner was signed by the Nemzeti Bajnokság I club Paksi FC.

== International career ==
In Hungary's opening match of the 2008–09 Under-19 European Championship qualifying against San Marino, Bajner scored a 16-minute hat-trick as his side won 6–0 on 20 October 2008.
