= Adrián Horváth =

Hungarian footballer

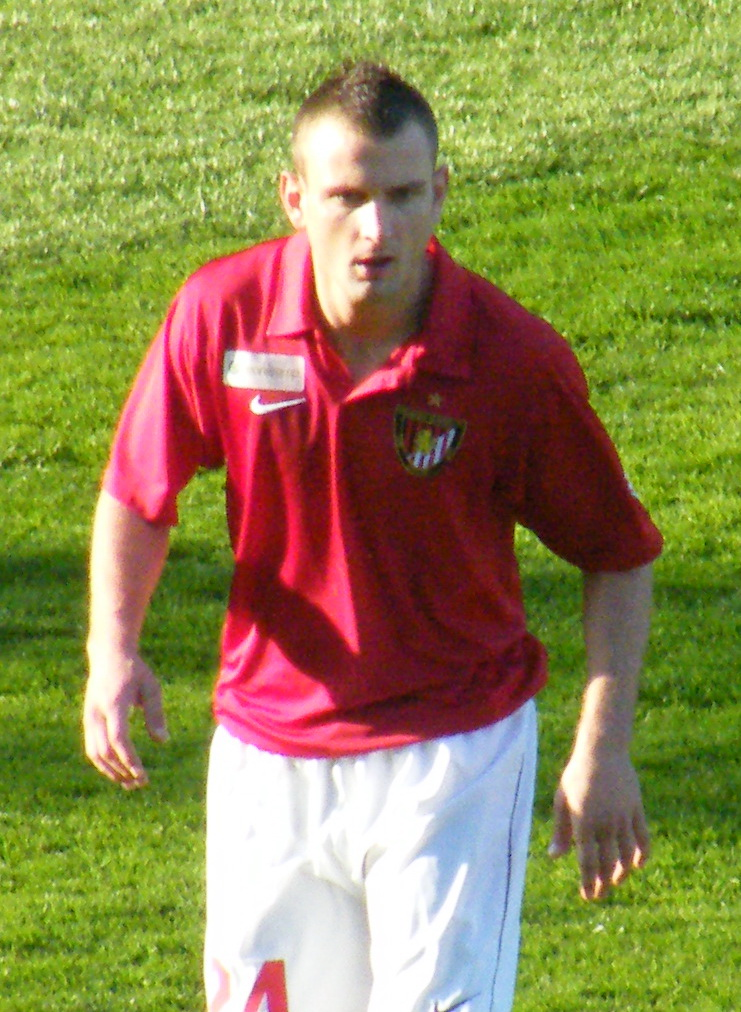

Personal information
- Date of birth: 20 November 1987 (age 38)
- Place of birth: Pécs, Hungary
- Height: 1.83 m (6 ft 0 in)
- Position: Midfielder

Youth career
- 2002–2003: Pécs

Senior career*
Years	Team	Apps	(Gls)
2003–2006	Pécs	0	(0)
2006–2008	Barcs	58	(2)
2008–2009	Kozármisleny	29	(2)
2009–2012	Budapest Honvéd	51	(1)
2012–2015	Pécs	76	(1)
2015–2017	Gyirmót	24	(0)
2017	Várda SE	16	(1)
2017–2018	Pécs	27	(3)
2018	Kaposvár	1	(0)
2018–2021	Tiszakécske	54	(1)
- * Club domestic league appearances and goals as of 12 December 2021

Adrián Horváth (born 20 November 1987) is a Hungarian football player.

== Club career ==
=== Budapest Honved ===
He made his debut on 25 July 2009 against Kaposvári Rákóczi FC in a match that ended 2–1.

== Club honours ==
=== Budapest Honvéd FC ===
- Hungarian Super Cup:
  - Runners-up: 2009
