= Viliam Macko =

Slovak football player (born 1981)

Personal information
- Full name: Viliam Macko
- Date of birth: 22 October 1981 (age 45)
- Place of birth: Prešov, Czechoslovakia
- Height: 1.76 m (5 ft 9 in)
- Positions: Midfielder; striker

Team information
- Current team: Club Green Streets

Youth career
- Prešov

Senior career*
| Years | Team | Apps | (Gls) |
| 1999–2006 | Prešov | ? | (?) |
| 2006–2008 | Ružomberok | ? | (?) |
| 2008–2009 | Zlaté Moravce | 11 | (2) |
| 2009 | → Ružomberok (loan) | 3 | (0) |
| 2009–2010 | Budapest Honvéd | 20 | (1) |
| 2010–2013 | Prešov | 44 | (4) |
| 2013 | → Dolný Kubín (loan) | 11 | (2) |
| 2013–2015 | Angthong | 40 | (21) |
| 2015 | New Radiant | | |
| 2016 | Prešov | 12 | (2) |
| 2017 | Abahani Limited | | |
| 2017– | Club Green Streets | | |
- * Club domestic league appearances and goals as of 10 June 2016

Viliam Macko (born 22 October 1981) is a Slovak football player.

== Club career ==
=== Budapest Honved ===
He made his debut on 25 July 2009 against Kaposvári Rákóczi FC in a match that ended 3–1.

== Club honours ==
=== 1. FC Tatran Presov ===
- Slovak First League:
  - 3rd place: 2003–04

=== MFK Ružomberok ===
- Slovak Super Cup:
  - Winner: 2006

=== Budapest Honvéd FC ===
- Hungarian Super Cup:
  - Runners-up: 2009
