= Gary Tavars =

French footballer (born 1984)

Personal information
- Full name: Gary Tavars
- Date of birth: 15 July 1984 (age 42)
- Place of birth: Paris, France
- Height: 1.78 m (5 ft 10 in)
- Position: Defender

Senior career*
Years	Team	Apps	(Gls)
2002–2004	Lucé		
2004–2006	Chartres		
2006–2007	Chmel Blšany	18	(0)
2007–2009	Baník Most	3	(0)
2010	Budapest Honvéd	1	(0)
2010	Budapest Honvéd II	6	(0)
- * Club domestic league appearances and goals as of 1 August 2010

Gary Tavars (born 15 July 1984) is a French former professional footballer who played as a defender.

== Career ==
Tavars made one appearance for Hungarian club Budapest Honvéd in the 2009–10 Nemzeti Bajnokság I.
