= Fernando Cuerda =

Spanish footballer

Personal information
- Full name: Fernando Cuerda Peña
- Date of birth: 6 March 1984 (age 42)
- Place of birth: Seville, Spain
- Height: 1.90 m (6 ft 3 in)
- Position: Centre back

Youth career
- 1998–2002: Sevilla

Senior career*
Years	Team	Apps	(Gls)
2002–2004	Sevilla B	1	(0)
2003–2004	→ Mérida (loan)	14	(0)
2005	Atlético Madrid B	1	(0)
2005–2008	Valladolid B	83	(5)
2008–2009	Kavala	9	(0)
2010	Honvéd	13	(2)
2011–2012	MAS Fez		
2012–2013	Piast Gliwice	13	(1)
Total		134	(8)
- * Club domestic league appearances and goals

Fernando Cuerda Peña (born 6 March 1984) is a Spanish former professional footballer who played as a central defender.

== Honours ==
Piast Gliwice

- I liga: 2011–12
