= Pablo Coira =

Spanish footballer (born 1979)

Personal information
- Full name: Pablo Coira Lojo
- Date of birth: 18 October 1979 (age 47)
- Place of birth: Vilagarcía de Arousa, Spain
- Height: 1.75 m (5 ft 9 in)
- Position: Right-back

Youth career
- 1997–1998: Compostela

Senior career*
Years	Team	Apps	(Gls)
1998–1999	Compostela	29	(2)
1999–2000	Celta B		
1999–2003	Celta	42	(0)
2003–2006	Alavés	20	(0)
2004–2005	→ Recreativo (loan)	3	(0)
2006–2007	Aris	8	(0)
2007–2008	Figueres		
2008–2009	Espanyol B		
2010	Honvéd	25	(4)
Total		127+	(6+)

International career
1999	Spain U20	9	(0)
1999–2001	Spain U21	9	(0)
Medal record
Representing Spain
Men's football
FIFA World Youth Championship
Winner	1999 Nigeria
- * Club domestic league appearances and goals

Pablo Coira Lojo (born 18 October 1979) is a Spanish former professional footballer who played mainly as a right-back.

== Career ==
After starting playing football with local SD Compostela, in the Segunda División, Coira joined Galicia giants RC Celta de Vigo in 1999, appearing sparingly throughout four La Liga seasons (maximum 18 league games in 2001–02). Shortly before signing, he represented Spain at the 1999 FIFA World Youth Championship, winning the tournament; also in the squad was his teammate Pablo Couñago, who was crowned the competition's top scorer.

Subsequently, Coira had unassuming stints with Deportivo Alavés – playing no matches in his final year, which ended in top-flight relegation, after falling out with chairman Dmitry Piterman, and being loaned to Recreativo de Huelva in between – and Greek club Aris Thessaloniki FC. He returned to Spain in January 2007 with UE Figueres in the Segunda División B, named UE Casteldefells shortly after.

For the 2008–09 campaign, Coira dropped down to Tercera División and joined RCD Espanyol's B team. In January 2010, he moved countries for the second time in his career, signing with Budapest Honvéd FC in Hungary, where he was mostly deployed as a central midfielder.

== Honours ==
Celta

- UEFA Intertoto Cup: 2000

Spain U20

- FIFA World Youth Championship: 1999
