= Norbert Hajdú =

Hungarian footballer

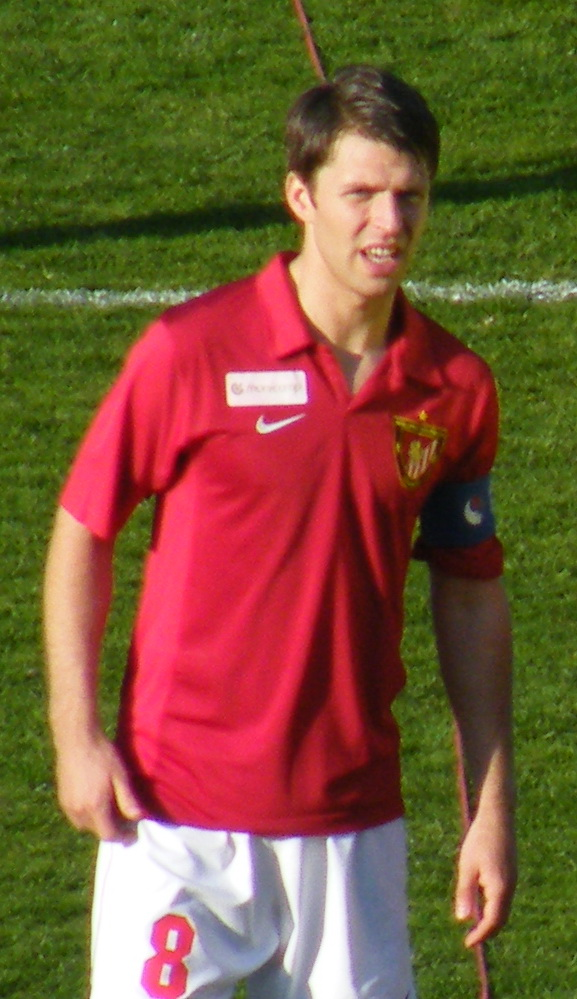

Personal information
- Date of birth: 1 October 1982 (age 44)
- Place of birth: Eger, Hungary
- Height: 1.76 m (5 ft 9 in)
- Position: Midfielder

Youth career
- 1996–1999: Vác

Senior career*
Years	Team	Apps	(Gls)
1999–2001	Vác	30	(6)
2001–2002	Újpest	0	(0)
2002–2003	Fót	34	(4)
2003–2004	Rákospalota	?	(?)
2004–2005	Vác	24	(4)
2005–2007	Tatabánya	105	(16)
2008–2010	Újpest	14	(1)
2008–2009	→ Zalaegerszeg (loan)	25	(2)
2009–2010	→ Honvéd (loan)	26	(4)
2010–2012	Honvéd	50	(5)
2012–2014	Zalaegerszeg	54	(1)
2014–2015	Vasas	10	(0)
2016	SV Stegersbach		
2017–2021	ASC Götzendorf Oranjezz		

International career
1998–1999	Hungary U-16	6	(0)
1999–2000	Hungary U-17	11	(1)
- * Club domestic league appearances and goals

Norbert Hajdú (born 1 October 1982) is a Hungarian former footballer who played as a midfielder.

Hajdú started to play football for Vác, making his first league debut at the age of 17. In 2001, he joined the youth team of Újpest FC and a year later the junior team, Újpest FC-Fót. In 2003, he was signed by REAC, where he spent the 2003/04 season. After playing for Vác during the following season, he joined Tatabánya, where he became a widely known player. Hajdú joined Újpest FC in January, 2008 and later went on loan to Zalaegerszegi TE. Hajdú again joined Újpest FC in June, 2009 and later went on loan to Bp. Honvéd.

== Club honours ==
=== Vác-Újbuda LTC ===
- Hungarian National Championship II:
  - 3rd place: 2004–05
- Hungarian National Championship III:
  - 3rd place: 2000–01

=== Újpest FC ===
- Hungarian Cup:
  - Winner: 2001–02
- Hungarian Super Cup:
  - Winner: 2001–02

=== Budapest Honvéd FC ===
- Hungarian Super Cup:
  - Runners-up: 2009
