= Roland Vólent =

Hungarian footballer

Personal information
- Date of birth: 23 September 1992 (age 34)
- Place of birth: Békéscsaba, Hungary
- Height: 1.92 m (6 ft 4 in)
- Position: Forward

Team information
- Current team: Békéscsaba
- Number: 10

Youth career
- 2000–2008: Békéscsaba

Senior career*
Years	Team	Apps	(Gls)
2008–2016	Honvéd	12	(0)
2009–2014	→ Honvéd II	47	(12)
2012	→ Sopron (loan)	12	(3)
2013	→ Kazincbarcika (loan)	15	(8)
2013–2014	→ Siófok (loan)	6	(1)
2014	→ Balmazújváros (loan)	11	(2)
2014–2015	→ Békéscsaba (loan)	14	(1)
2015–2016	→ Szigetszentmiklós (loan)	29	(8)
2016–2018	Balmazújváros	29	(5)
2018	Siófok	14	(6)
2018–2019	Gyirmót	9	(1)
2019	Békéscsaba	16	(1)
2019–2022	Szolnoki MÁV	43	(6)
2022–2023	Tiszakécske	22	(3)
2023–	Békéscsaba	40	(16)

International career
2009–2010	Hungary U-18	1	(2)
2010–2011	Hungary U-19		
- * Club domestic league appearances and goals as of 10 June 2025

Roland Vólent (born 23 September 1992) is a Hungarian football player who plays for Békéscsaba.

== Club career ==
=== Budapest Honved ===
He made his debut on 28 April 2009 against BFC Siófok in a match that ended 0–2.

== Club honours ==
=== Budapest Honvéd FC ===
- Hungarian Super Cup:
  - Runners-up: 2009
