= Jean-Baptiste Akassou =

Ivorian footballer

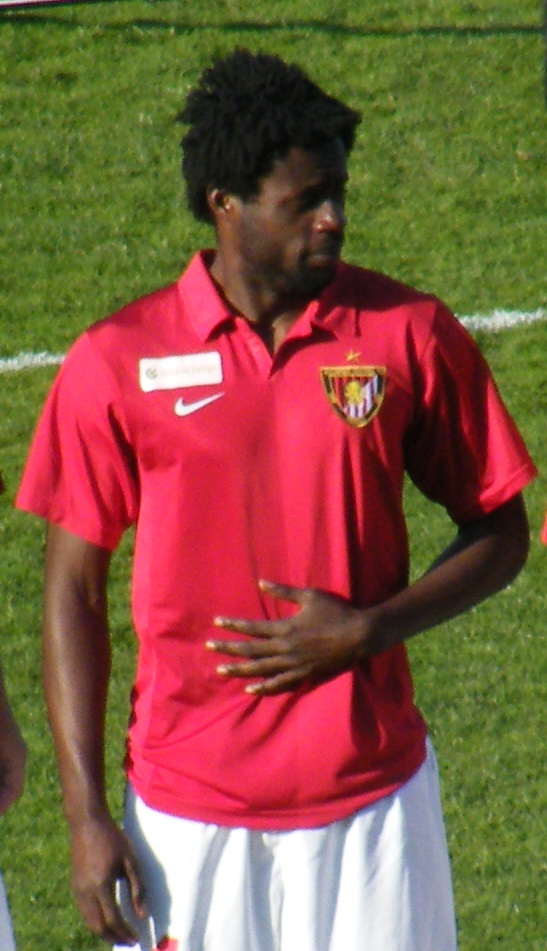

Personal information
- Full name: Jean-Baptiste Akra Akassou
- Date of birth: November 5, 1985 (age 41)
- Place of birth: Songon, Ivory Coast
- Height: 1.75 m (5 ft 9 in)
- Positions: Defender; defensive midfielder

Team information
- Current team: Anagennisi Karditsa

Youth career
- Académie de JMG

Senior career*
Years	Team	Apps	(Gls)
2006	Stade d'Abidjan		
2006–2007	Muangthong United		
2008–2009	BEC Tero Sasana		
2010–2012	Honvéd	49	(2)
2012–2013	Pécsi MFC	24	(0)
2013–2014	Niki Volos	29	(1)
2014–2015	Apollon Kalamarias	15	(1)
2015–2016	Anagennisi Karditsa	12	(0)
2016–	Doxa Drama		
- * Club domestic league appearances and goals as of 9 August 2014

Jean-Baptiste Akra Akassou (born November 5, 1985, in Songon) is an Ivorian professional footballer who currently plays for Anagennisi Karditsa.His weight is 73kg.

== Honours ==
=== Club ===
Muangthong United

- Thailand Division 2 League Champions (1) : 2007

Niki Volos

- Football League (Greece) Champions (1) : 2013–14
