= Pavlo Yanchuk =

Ukrainian footballer

Personal information
- Full name: Pavlo Sergeyevich Yanchuk
- Date of birth: 12 July 1986 (age 40)
- Place of birth: Kiev, Soviet Union
- Height: 1.84 m (6 ft 0 in)
- Position: Defender

Youth career
- 1999–2003: Dynamo Kyiv

Senior career*
Years	Team	Apps	(Gls)
2003–2005	FC Obolon-2 Kyiv	27	(0)
2006–2007	Argeș Pitești	0	(0)
2008	FC St. Pauli	1	(0)
2009–2010	Liberty Salonta	4	(0)
2009	→ Dinamo II București (loan)	3	(0)
2010	→ Budapest Honvéd (loan)	6	(0)
2010	Bihor Oradea	3	(0)
2012	FC Tiraspol	11	(0)
- * Club domestic league appearances and goals

Pavlo Sergeyevich Yanchuk (born 12 July 1986) is a Ukrainian former professional footballer who played as a defender.

== Career ==
Yanchuk started playing football in the Dynamo Kyiv Youth Academy. He then left for the Ukrainian First League club Obolon Kyiv from where he was bought by the Romanian side, FC Argeş Piteşti. During the 2008 winter transfer season, Yanchuk signed a half-season deal with FC St Pauli after unsuccessfully trying out in Schalke 04, He left then in July 2008 to Hamburg. Afterward, he played for Romanian side Liberty Salonta.
