= 2009–10 Nyíregyháza Spartacus FC season =

Nyíregyháza
2009–10 season
- Owner: Gyula Sziky
- Manager: Lázár Szentes
- Stadium: Városi Stadion
- Nemzeti Bajnokság I: 15th (relegated)
- Magyar Kupa: Third round
- Ligakupa: Second group stage
- Top goalscorer: League: Fouad Bouguerra (10); All: Fouad Bouguerra (13)
- Highest home attendance: 10,000 v Ferencváros (7 August 2009, Nemzeti Bajnokság I)
- Lowest home attendance: 200 (multiple Ligakupa matches)
- Average home league attendance: 3,300
- Biggest win: 7–0 v MTK (Home, 23 September 2009, Ligakupa); 7–0 v Diósgyőr (Away, 5 December 2009, Ligakupa)
- Biggest defeat: 0–5 v Honvéd (Home, 17 March 2010, Ligakupa)

The 2009–10 season was Nyíregyháza Spartacus Football Club's 11th competitive season, 3rd consecutive season in the Nemzeti Bajnokság I and 83rd season in existence as a football club. In addition to the domestic league, Nyíregyháza participated in that season's editions of the Magyar Kupa and the Ligakupa.

== Squad ==
Squad at end of season

Note: Flags indicate national team as defined under FIFA eligibility rules; some limited exceptions apply. Players may hold more than one non-FIFA nationality.

No.	Pos.	Nation	Player
1	GK	SRB	Draško Vojinović
3	DF	BRA	Diego Balbinot
4	DF	HUN	Balázs Nánási
5	MF	HUN	Attila Zabos
8	MF	HUN	Zsolt Müller
9	MF	HUN	Dávid Pákolicz
10	FW	HUN	Péter Andorka
11	DF	MNE	Petar Stanišić
12	MF	HUN	László Miskolczi
13	DF	SVK	Peter Struhár
14	FW	SRB	Milan Davidov
16	MF	HUN	Bence Bakos
19	FW	FRA	Nacim Abdelali
20	MF	HUN	Tibor Minczér
21	MF	HUN	Zoltán Böőr
25	DF	EST	Martin Hurt
26	DF	HUN	Dávid Oláh

No.	Pos.	Nation	Player
29	FW	SLE	Alfi Conteh-Lacalle
33	GK	UKR	Volodymyr Ovsiyenko
34	DF	HUN	József Csáki
35	MF	SRB	Predrag Bošnjak
37	DF	HUN	Krisztián Varga
42	FW	HUN	Gergely Simon
44	DF	SRB	Željko Kovačević
45	FW	JPN	Kazuo Honma
66	GK	HUN	Tibor Sánta
83	GK	HUN	Zsolt Dénes
88	MF	HUN	Ádám Fekete
89	MF	HUN	János Markos
90	GK	HUN	Ferenc Gazsi
92	FW	HUN	Balázs Batizi-Pócsi
93	FW	HUN	Szabolcs Banka
99	FW	ALG	Fouad Bouguerra

== Transfers ==
=== Transfers in ===
Transfer window	Pos.	No.	Player	From
Summer	GK	1	(Serbia) Draško Vojinović	(Hungary) Diósgyőr
Summer	MF	8	(Hungary) Zsolt Müller	(Hungary) Integrál-DAC
Summer	FW	10	(Hungary) Péter Andorka	(Hungary) Haladás
Summer	FW	10	(Serbia) Igor Bogdanović	(Hungary) Debrecen
Summer	MF	21	(Hungary) Zoltán Böőr	(Hungary) Győr
Summer	FW	45	(Japan) Kazuo Honma	(Hungary) Diósgyőr
Summer	GK	83	(Hungary) Zsolt Dénes	(Hungary) Tatabánya
Winter	DF	3	(Brazil) Diego Balbinot	(Estonia) Nõmme Kalju
Winter	DF	11	(Montenegro) Petar Stanišić	(Kazakhstan) Kairat
Winter	DF	13	(Slovakia) Peter Struhár	(Czech Republic) Slovácko
Winter	FW	14	(Serbia) Milan Davidov	(Serbia) Borac Čačak
Winter	FW	19	(France) Nacim Abdelali	(Algeria) Blida
Winter	DF	25	(Estonia) Martin Hurt	(Hungary) Nõmme Kalju
Winter	GK	33	(Ukraine) Volodymyr Ovsiyenko	(Ukraine) Naftovyk-Ukrnafta Okhtyrka
Winter	MF	35	(Serbia) Predrag Bošnjak	(Serbia) Novi Sad
Winter	DF	44	(Serbia) Željko Kovačević	(Serbia) Smederevo
Winter	FW	93	(Hungary) Szabolcs Banka	(Hungary) Nyírsuli
Winter	FW	99	(Algeria) Fouad Bouguerra	(Algeria) JSM Béjaïa

=== Transfers out ===
Transfer window	Pos.	No.	Player	To
Summer	GK	1	(Hungary) Dániel Illyés	(Hungary) Released
Summer	FW	9	(Romania) Bogdan Apostu	(Israel) Bnei Sakhnin
Summer	DF	15	(Hungary) László Ur	(Hungary) Bőcs
Summer	MF	17	(Hungary) Tibor Hegedűs	(Hungary) Mezőkövesd
Summer	MF	21	(Hungary) Árpád Majoros	(Hungary) Szigetszentmiklós
Summer	MF	23	(Hungary) Péter Odrobéna	(Hungary) Tiszaújváros
Summer	MF	27	(Honduras) Luis Ramos	(Hungary) Debrecen
Summer	GK	33	(Romania) Filip Lăzăreanu	(Hungary) Kecskemét
Winter	DF	3	(Romania) Claudiu Cornaci	Released
Winter	FW	10	(Serbia) Igor Bogdanović	(Hungary) Haladás
Winter	DF	14	(Hungary) Árpád Ambrusz	Retired
Winter	DF	29	(Romania) Cosmin Goia	Released

=== Loans in ===
Transfer window	Pos.	No.	Player	From	End date
Summer	MF	9	(Hungary) Dávid Pákolicz	(Hungary) Győr	End of season
Summer	DF	11	(Hungary) Szilárd Éles	(Hungary) Debrecen	End of summer
Summer	FW	11	(Hungary) Tibor Márkus	(Hungary) Paks	Middle of season
Summer	MF	21	(Hungary) Tamás Szélpál	(Hungary) Debrecen	Middle of season
Summer	FW	25	(Hungary) Viktor Bölcsföldi	(Romania) Liberty Oradea	Middle of season
Summer	MF	27	(Slovakia) Károly Czanik	(Hungary) Debrecen	Middle of season
Summer	DF	33	(Hungary) Zoltán Kovács	(Hungary) Győr	Middle of season
Summer	DF	86	(Hungary) Zoltán Kiss	(Hungary) Újpest	Middle of season

=== Loans out ===
Transfer window	Pos.	No.	Player	To	End date
Summer	GK	22	(Hungary) Norbert Tóth	(Hungary) Baktalórántháza	Middle of season
Summer	FW	25	(Hungary) Norbert Szilágyi	(Hungary) Bőcs	Middle of season
Winter	DF	7	(Hungary) István Lakatos	(Hungary) Tuzsér	End of season
Winter	DF	18	(Cameroon) Yves Mboussi	(Hungary) Vecsés	End of season
Winter	GK	22	(Hungary) Norbert Tóth	(Hungary) Ibrány	Middle of season
Winter	FW	25	(Hungary) Norbert Szilágyi	(Hungary) Kazincbarcika	End of season
Winter	FW	28	(Ivory Coast) Sindou Dosso	(Hungary) Vecsés	End of season

== Competitions ==
=== Overview ===
Competition	First match	Last match	Starting round	Final position	Record							
Competition	First match	Last match	Starting round	Final position	Pld	W	D	L	GF	GA	GD	Win %
Nemzeti Bajnokság I	24 July 2009	22 May 2010	Matchday 1	15th	30	6	9	15	41	60	−19	20.00
Magyar Kupa	16 September 2009	16 September 2009	Third round	Third round	1	0	0	1	0	2	−2	0.00
Ligakupa	22 July 2009	7 April 2010	First group stage	Second group stage	16	5	3	8	30	30	+0	31.25
Total					47	11	12	24	71	92	−21	23.40

Source: Competitions

=== Nemzeti Bajnokság I ===
==== League table ====
Pos	Team	Pld	W	D	L	GF	GA	GD	Pts	Qualification or relegation
12	Kaposvár	30	8	8	14	38	50	−12	32	
13	Vasas	30	8	7	15	39	61	−22	31	
14	Paks	30	7	10	13	31	44	−13	31	
15	Nyíregyháza (R)	30	6	9	15	41	60	−19	27	Relegation to Nemzeti Bajnokság II
16	Diósgyőr (R)	30	4	5	21	31	56	−25	17	Relegation to Nemzeti Bajnokság II

Source: soccerway.com
Rules for classification: 1st points; 2nd overall wins; 3rd goal difference; 4th goals scored
(R) Relegated

==== Results summary ====
Overall								Home						Away					
Pld	W	D	L	GF	GA	GD	Pts	W	D	L	GF	GA	GD	W	D	L	GF	GA	GD
30	6	9	15	41	60	−19	27	4	5	6	26	29	−3	2	4	9	15	31	−16

Source: Hungarian Football Federation

==== Results by round ====
Round	1	2	3	4	5	6	7	8	9	10	11	12	13	14	15	16	17	18	19	20	21	22	23	24	25	26	27	28	29	30
Ground	H	A	H	A	H	A	H	A	H	A	H	A	H	A	H	A	H	A	H	A	H	A	H	A	H	A	H	A	H	A
Result	W	L	W	D	D	L	L	L	L	D	D	L	L	L	L	W	D	D	W	L	L	L	D	L	L	W	W	D	D	L
Position	1	6	4	4	4	8	10	10	13	13	14	14	16	16	16	15	15	15	15	15	15	15	15	15	15	15	15	15	15	15
Points	3	3	6	7	8	8	8	8	8	9	10	10	10	10	10	13	14	15	18	18	18	18	19	19	19	22	25	26	27	27

Source: Matches
A = Away; H = Home; W = Win; D = Draw; L = Loss

==== Matches ====
24 July 2009 1	Nyíregyháza	5–1	Vasas	Nyíregyháza
19:00 CEST (UTC+2)	Andorka 10'; Miskolczi 39', (yellow card) 72'; Honma 46', 51'; Bogdanović 60'; Minczér (yellow card) 78'	Report	Pavičević (yellow card) 23'; Lázok 28'; Kovács (yellow card) 38'; Piller (yellow card) 76'; L. Szűcs (yellow card) 90'	Stadium: Városi Stadion; Attendance: 4,000; Referee: Ádám Farkas; Assistant referees: Attila Kelemen, István Tóth; Fourth official: László Varga

1 August 2009 2	Paks	1–0	Nyíregyháza	Paks
20:00 CEST (UTC+2)	Tököli 18'; Horváth (yellow card) 42'	Report	Mboussi (yellow card) 17'; Zabos (yellow card) 78'	Stadium: Fehérvári úti Stadion; Attendance: 3,100; Referee: Ferenc Bede; Assistant referees: László Viszokai, Balázs Farkas; Fourth official: Tibor Farkas

7 August 2009 3	Nyíregyháza	3–1	Ferencváros	Nyíregyháza
19:00 CEST (UTC+2)	Dosso 14'; Miskolczi (yellow card) 30'; Honma 33', 65'; Kiss (yellow card) 84'	Report	Wedgbury (yellow card) 34', (goal) 54'; Dragóner (yellow card) 68'	Stadium: Városi Stadion; Attendance: 10,000; Referee: Tamás Arany; Assistant referees: Róbert Kispál, János Demeter; Fourth official: Dániel Becséri

15 August 2009 4	Kaposvár	1–1	Nyíregyháza	Kaposvár
20:00 CEST (UTC+2)	Nikolić 54'; Stanić (yellow card) 65'; Zahorecz (yellow card) 75'; Petrók (yellow card) 86'; Maróti (yellow card) 89'	Report	Zabos (yellow card) 12'; Honma 27', (yellow card) 89'; Miskolczi (yellow card) 43'; Goia (yellow card) 66'; Andorka (yellow card) 75'; Kiss (red card) 86'	Stadium: Rákóczi Stadion; Attendance: 2,500; Referee: Tamás Bognár; Assistant referees: Balázs Huszár, Arnold Kepe; Fourth official: Krisztián Király

22 August 2009 5	Nyíregyháza	1–1	MTK	Nyíregyháza
20:00 CEST (UTC+2)	Bogdanović 29'; Goia (yellow card) 76'	Report	Balogh (yellow card) 24'; Gosztonyi 45'	Stadium: Városi Stadion; Attendance: 4,000; Referee: Zoltán Iványi; Assistant referees: István Albert, János Medovarszki; Fourth official: Gábor Oláh

29 August 2009 6	Debrecen	3–1	Nyíregyháza	Debrecen
15:00 CEST (UTC+2)	Rudolf 7', 49'; Coulibaly 22'; Bernáth (yellow card) 66'	Report	Honma 56'; Mboussi (yellow card) 65'	Stadium: Oláh Gábor utcai Stadion; Attendance: 7,500; Referee: Péter Solymosi; Assistant referees: Oszkár Lémon, Gábor Takács; Fourth official: Dávid Ákos

12 September 2009 7	Nyíregyháza	2–3	Videoton	Nyíregyháza
19:00 CEST (UTC+2)	Honma (yellow card) 6', (goal) 90+1'; Mboussi (red card) 15'; Dosso 32'; Nánási (yellow card) 71'; Goia (yellow card) 78'	Report	Alves 9', 75'; Lipták (yellow card) 22'; Sitku (yellow card) 33', (goal) 53'; B. Farkas I (yellow card) 56'; Polonkai (yellow card) 56'	Stadium: Városi Stadion; Attendance: 4,000; Referee: Zsolt Szabó; Assistant referees: Róbert Kispál, Dr. Zsolt Varga; Fourth official: Róbert Nagy

19 September 2009 8	Újpest	3–1	Nyíregyháza	Budapest
17:30 CEST (UTC+2)	Kabát 42', 55'; Takács (yellow card) 67'; Tóth (yellow card) 69'; Rajczi 88'	Report	Ambrusz (yellow card) 17'; Goia 28', (red card) 55'	Stadium: Szusza Ferenc Stadion; Attendance: 4,315; Referee: Gergely Sulyok; Assistant referees: György Ring, Tibor Vígh; Fourth official: Gergő Janitz

26 September 2009 9	Nyíregyháza	1–3	Győr	Nyíregyháza
17:30 CEST (UTC+2)	Pákolicz 23'; Zabos (yellow card) 49'; Miskolczi (yellow card) 59'; Cornaci (red card) 89'	Report	Józsi (yellow card) 28'; Kink 30', 74', (yellow card) 49'; Aleksidze (yellow card) 43', (goal) 90+4'; Szabó (yellow card) 80'	Stadium: Városi Stadion; Attendance: 2,500; Referee: Ádám Farkas; Assistant referees: Attila Kelemen, János Demeter; Fourth official: László Varga

4 October 2009 10	Kecskemét	2–2	Nyíregyháza	Kecskemét
17:30 CEST (UTC+2)	Montvai 21', (yellow card) 21'; Csordás 30'; Gyagya (yellow card) 56'	Report	Andorka 9'; Kiss (yellow card) 50'; Pákolicz 59'; Zabos (yellow card) 64'; Nánási (yellow card) 90'	Stadium: Széktói Stadion; Attendance: 2,700; Referee: Tamás Arany; Assistant referees: Zsolt Szpisják, János Medovarszki; Fourth official: Dániel Becséri

17 October 2009 11	Nyíregyháza	1–1	Diósgyőr	Nyíregyháza
17:30 CEST (UTC+2)	Vojinović (yellow card) 20'; Batizi-Pócsi (yellow card) 67'; Lakatos 78' (o.g.)	Report	Lippai (yellow card) 9'; Višković (yellow card) 18'; Ivancsics 20'; Apostu (yellow card) 65'; Huszák (yellow card) 69'; Szabó (yellow card) 88'	Stadium: Városi Stadion; Attendance: 3,500; Referee: Péter Solymosi; Assistant referees: Róbert Kispál, István Tóth; Fourth official: Dávid Ákos

24 October 2009 12	Pápa	5–1	Nyíregyháza	Pápa
17:00 CEST (UTC+2)	Bárányos 47'; Orosz (yellow card) 52'; De Paula 65', 90+1'; Bali 83'; Gyömbér 88'	Report	Z. Kovács (yellow card) 12'; Andorka 39'; Goia (yellow card) 72'	Stadium: Perutz Stadion; Attendance: 1,500; Referee: Zoltán Iványi; Assistant referees: István Albert, Tibor Vígh; Fourth official: J. Zoltán Kovács

31 October 2009 13	Nyíregyháza	0–1	Honvéd	Nyíregyháza
17:00 CET (UTC+1)	Goia (yellow card) 27'	Report	Nagy 9'; Hrepka (yellow card) 20'; Moreira (red card) 82'; Macko (yellow card) 90'	Stadium: Városi Stadion; Attendance: 1,500; Referee: István Vad; Assistant referees: Zsolt Márton, Tamás Márkus; Fourth official: Róbert Nagy

7 November 2009 14	Haladás	2–0	Nyíregyháza	Szombathely
16:00 CET (UTC+1)	Á. Simon 20'; Tóth 70'; Kuttor (yellow card) 90+4'; Rajos (yellow card) 90+7'	Report	Miskolczi (yellow card) 33'	Stadium: Rohonci út Attendance: 2,000; Referee: Ádám Németh; Assistant referees: Vencel Tóth II, Balázs Farkas; Fourth official: Gergő Király

21 November 2009 15	Nyíregyháza	0–4	Zalaegerszeg	Nyíregyháza
16:00 CET (UTC+1)	Minczér (yellow card) 25'; Mboussi (red card) 45'; Zabos (yellow card) 62'	Report	Rudņevs 39', 53', 80'; Pavićević 76'; Barna (yellow card) 90'	Stadium: Városi Stadion; Attendance: 2,500; Referee: Tamás Bognár; Assistant referees: Oszkár Lémon, Gábor Takács; Fourth official: Dábid Ákos

28 February 2010 16	Vasas	2–3	Nyíregyháza	Budapest
17:30 CET (UTC+1)	Divić 10'; Pavičević (yellow card) 33'; Hrepka 40'; Kovács (yellow card) 45'; Katona (yellow card) 80'; Bakos (yellow card) 83'	Report	Balbinot (yellow card) 27'; Struhár 45'; Hrepka 89' (o.g.); Kovačević 90+1'	Stadium: Illovszky Rudolf Stadion; Attendance: 1,000; Referee: Roland Veizer; Assistant referees: János Demeter, Róbert Horváth; Fourth official: László Varga

6 March 2010 17	Nyíregyháza	1–1	Paks	Nyíregyháza
14:00 CET (UTC+1)	Fekete 72'; Struhár (yellow card) 76'; Davidov (yellow card) 80'	Report	Szabó (yellow card) 13'; Tököli 14'; Vári (yellow card) 71'; Fiola (yellow card) 80'; Horváth (yellow card) 85'; Heffler (yellow card) 88'	Stadium: Városi Stadion; Attendance: 2,500; Referee: Szabolcs Szilasi; Assistant referees: István Tóth, Gábor Gyürüsi; Fourth official: Balázs Berke

12 March 2010 18	Ferencváros	0–0	Nyíregyháza	Budapest
19:00 CET (UTC+1)	Tutorić (yellow card) 67'; Abdi (yellow card) 84'; Doherty (yellow card) 86'	Report	Abdelali (yellow card) 59'; Honma (yellow card) 86'; Nánási (red card) 90+2'	Stadium: Stadion Albert Flórián; Attendance: 4,000; Referee: Viktor Kassai; Assistant referees: Gábor Erős, Tibor Vámos; Fourth official: Krisztián Pánczél

20 March 2010 19	Nyíregyháza	2–1	Kaposvár	Nyíregyháza
14:30 CET (UTC+1)	Bouguerra 19'; Miskolczi (yellow card) 38'; Zabos (yellow card) 63'; Honma 67'	Report	Petrók (yellow card) 18'; Zahorecz (yellow card) 52'; Bogdán (yellow card) 57'; Gujić 82'	Stadium: Városi Stadion; Attendance: 2,500; Referee: Roland Veizer; Assistant referees: Péter Berettyán, Róbert Horváth; Fourth official: Róbert Nagy

27 March 2010 20	MTK	4–0	Nyíregyháza	Budapest
15:00 CET (UTC+1)	Kulcsár 25', (yellow card) 65'; Könyves 26'; Pál 63'; Lázok 90'	Report	Nánási (yellow card) 82'; Davidov (red card) 85'	Stadium: Hidegkuti Nándor Stadion; Attendance: 500; Referee: Ádám Farkas; Assistant referees: Attila Kelemen, Gyula Fehér; Fourth official: Balázs Berke

11 April 2010 22	Videoton	1–0	Nyíregyháza	Székesfehérvár
17:30 CEST (UTC+2)	Sándor 28'	Report	Hurt (yellow card) 16'; Struhár (yellow card) 21'; Zabos (yellow card) 45'	Stadium: Sóstói Stadion; Attendance: 2,889; Referee: Ádám Németh; Assistant referees: Zsolt Butkai, Zsolt Márton; Fourth official: Szabolcs Fenyvesi

17 April 2010 23	Nyíregyháza	2–2	Újpest	Nyíregyháza
17:30 CEST (UTC+2)	Bošnjak 42'; Minczér (yellow card) 71'; Andorka 76'	Report	Vermes 14'; Horváth (red card) 39'; Rajczi (yellow card) 39'; Vaskó (yellow card) 40'; Kéthévoama 72'; Barczi (yellow card) 85'	Stadium: Városi Stadion; Attendance: 3,000; Referee: István Vad; Assistant referees: Vencel Tóth II, István Tóth; Fourth official: Ádám Farkas

20 April 2010 21	Nyíregyháza	0–3	Debrecen	Nyíregyháza
19:00 CEST (UTC+2)		Report	Mijadinoski 41'; Feczesin 55'; Coulibaly 57'; Ramos (yellow card) 73'	Stadium: Városi Stadion; Attendance: 4,000; Referee: Zoltán Iványi; Assistant referees: István Albert, János Medovarszki; Fourth official: László Varga

24 April 2010 24	Győr	2–1	Nyíregyháza	Győr
18:00 CEST (UTC+2)	Kink 35', 47', (yellow card) 71'; Ganugrava (yellow card) 75'; Babić (red card) 84'; Stevanović (yellow card) 84'	Report	Stanišić (yellow card) 24'; Bouguerra (yellow card) 30'; Honma (yellow card) 62'; Davidov (yellow card) 78'; Kovačević 86'	Stadium: ETO Park; Attendance: 1,500; Referee: Zsolt Szabó; Assistant referees: Gábor Erős, Tibor Vámos; Fourth official: Krisztián Pánczél

1 May 2010 25	Nyíregyháza	2–3	Kecskemét	Nyíregyháza
17:00 CEST (UTC+2)	Bouguerra 10', 60', (yellow card) 39'; Minczér (yellow card) 42'; Zabos (yellow card) 65'	Report	I. Farkas 6'; Montvai 26'; Koncz (not on pitch) (yellow card) 27'; Čukić 46'; Alempijević (yellow card) 51'; Schindler (yellow card) 67'; Simon (red card) 77'	Stadium: Városi Stadion; Attendance: 2,000; Referee: Ferenc Bede; Assistant referees: György Ring, Balázs Farkas; Fourth official: Balázs Berke

5 May 2010 26	Diósgyőr	0–1	Nyíregyháza	Miskolc
18:00 CEST (UTC+2)	Dobos (yellow card) 74'; Menougong (yellow card) 84'	Report	Bouguerra 40'; Minczér (yellow card) 71'; Stanišić (red card) 82'	Stadium: Diósgyőri Stadion; Attendance: 2,500; Referee: Ádám Farkas; Assistant referees: Attila Kelemen, Gyula Fehér; Fourth official: László Varga

8 May 2010 27	Nyíregyháza	3–1	Pápa	Nyíregyháza
18:00 CEST (UTC+2)	Andorka 41', (yellow card) 66'; Miskolczi 65'; Abdelali 73', (yellow card) 73'	Report	Gyömbér 58'; Mészáros (yellow card) 85'	Stadium: Városi Stadion; Attendance: 1,500; Referee: Viktor Kassai; Assistant referees: László Viszokai, István Tóth; Fourth official: Gyöngyi Gaál

15 May 2010 28	Honvéd	1–1	Nyíregyháza	Budapest
18:00 CEST (UTC+2)	Cuerda 88'; Vaccaro (yellow card) 90+1'	Report	Miskolczi (yellow card) 31'; Hurt (yellow card) 53'; Struhár 90'	Stadium: Bozsik József Stadion; Attendance: 800; Referee: István Vad; Assistant referees: Balázs Farkas, Zsolt Butkai; Fourth official: Gyöngyi Gaál

19 May 2010 29	Nyíregyháza	3–3	Haladás	Nyíregyháza
18:00 CEST (UTC+2)	Minczér (yellow card) 25'; Balbinot (yellow card) 44'; Vojinović (yellow card) 61'; Bouguerra 65', 71', 81'	Report	Nagy (yellow card) 16'; Á. Simon 34'; A. Simon 45'; Molnár 62', (yellow card) 83'; Tóth (yellow card) 81'; Lengyel (yellow card) 89'	Stadium: Városi Stadion; Attendance: 2,000; Referee: Zoltán Iványi; Assistant referees: István Albert, János Medovarszki; Fourth official: Gábor Fajkusz

22 May 2010 30	Zalaegerszeg	4–3	Nyíregyháza	Zalaegerszeg
15:00 CEST (UTC+2)	Todorović (yellow card) 39'; Rudņevs 48'; Pavićević 54', 56', 71', (yellow card) 71'; Bogunović (red card) 81'	Report	Bouguerra 8', 16', 62'; Struhár (yellow card) 34'; Miskolczi (yellow card) 77'	Stadium: ZTE Arena; Attendance: 2,028; Referee: Tamás Bognár; Assistant referees: Gábor Takács, Milán Mohos; Fourth official: Gábor Barna

=== Magyar Kupa ===
16 September 2009 Third round	Nyírmada	2–0	Nyíregyháza	Nyírmada
15:30 CEST (UTC+2)	A. Danku (yellow card) 11'; Benkő 16', (yellow card) 65'; Tuza (yellow card) 83'; Tóth 86'	Report	Varga (yellow card) 38'; Mboussi (yellow card) 40'; Müller (yellow card) 41'	Stadium: Városi sportpálya Attendance: 300; Referee: Csaba Sándor; Assistant referees: Elemér Vitkai, Ferenc Papp

=== Ligakupa ===
==== First group stage ====
Pos	Team	Pld	W	D	L	GF	GA	GD	Pts	Qualification	FER	NYI	VAS	MTK	KEC	DIO
1	Ferencváros	10	7	0	3	21	15	+6	21	Advance to second group stage	—	4–0	2–1	1–3	4–2	2–0
2	Nyíregyháza	10	5	2	3	28	13	+15	17	Advance to second group stage	3–4	—	2–3	7–0	2–0	3–0
3	Vasas	10	5	0	5	21	23	−2	15		3–0	1–3	—	2–1	5–0	3–1
4	MTK	10	3	4	3	15	16	−1	13		0–1	0–0	3–0	—	1–1	1–1
5	Kecskemét	10	3	3	4	16	21	−5	12		0–3	1–1	4–3	2–2	—	3–0
6	Diósgyőr	10	2	1	7	13	26	−13	7		3–0	0–7	7–0	1–4	0–3	—

Source: Hungarian Football Federation

22 July 2009 1	MTK	0–0	Nyíregyháza	Budapest
17:00 CEST (UTC+2)	Gál (yellow card) 76'	Report	Csáki (yellow card) 90'	Stadium: Hidegkuti Nándor Stadion; Attendance: 300; Referee: Ádám Németh; Assistant referees: János Demeter, Tamás Márkus

29 July 2009 2	Nyíregyháza	2–0	Kecskemét	Nyíregyháza
19:00 CEST (UTC+2)	Dosso 2'; Batizi-Pócsi 38'; Müller (yellow card) 50'	Report	Alempijević (yellow card) 28'	Stadium: Városi Stadion; Attendance: 500; Referee: László Varga; Assistant referees: Gyula Ortó, Zoltán Pápai

4 August 2009 3	Ferencváros	4–0	Nyíregyháza	Budapest
18:00 CEST (UTC+2)	Pisanjuk 11', (yellow card) 29'; Rósa 20', 32', 35'; Vattai (yellow card) 57'	Report	Szilágyi (yellow card) 44'	Stadium: Stadion Albert Flórián; Attendance: 2,500; Referee: Mihály Fábián; Assistant referees: Dr. Zsolt Varga, Zsolt Butkai

19 August 2009 4	Vasas	1–3	Nyíregyháza	Budapest
18:00 CEST (UTC+2)	Kelemen (yellow card) 29'; L. Szűcs 65'	Report	Nánási 3'; Minczér (yellow card) 18'; Varga (yellow card) 52'; Czanik 69', 90+2'; Bakos (yellow card) 79'; Markos (yellow card) 88'	Stadium: Illovszky Rudolf Stadion; Attendance: 200; Referee: J. Zoltán Kovács; Assistant referees: Tamás Péter, Andrea Hima

26 August 2008 5	Nyíregyháza	3–0	Diósgyőr	Nyíregyháza
17:00 CEST (UTC+2)	Batizi-Pócsi 32', 77'; Varga (yellow card) 35'; Nánási (yellow card) 65'; Markos 82'	Report	Jovanović (yellow card) 38'; Faggyas (yellow card) 56'; Jeknić (red card) 78'	Stadium: Városi Stadion; Attendance: 400; Referee: Roland Veizer; Assistant referees: Péter Berettyán, Róbert Horváth

23 September 2009 6	Nyíregyháza	7–0	MTK	Nyíregyháza
17:00 CEST (UTC+2)	Mboussi (yellow card) 19'; Andorka 40', 65'; Goia 45'; Bakos (yellow card) 79'; Bölcsföldi 84'; Danci 86', 90'; Müller 87'	Report	Hubai (yellow card) 66'; Ladányi (yellow card) 82'; Kornis (red card) 89'	Stadium: Városi Stadion; Attendance: 300; Referee: Roland Veizer; Assistant referees: Péter Berettyán, Róbert Horváth

4 November 2009 7	Kecskemét	1–1	Nyíregyháza	Kecskemét
16:00 CET (UTC+1)	Dvorschák (yellow card) 40', (goal) 81'; Koszó (yellow card) 68'	Report	Pákolicz 34'; Oláh (yellow card) 37'; Abdelali (yellow card) 40'; Csáki (yellow card) 80'	Stadium: Széktói Stadion; Attendance: 100; Referee: J. Zoltán Kovács; Assistant referees: Roland Hofbauer, Dániel Szalai

11 November 2009 8	Nyíregyháza	3–4	Ferencváros	Nyíregyháza
18:00 CET (UTC+1)	Bouguerra 36', 42', 45'	Report	Takács 9'; Ashmore 22'; Holczer (yellow card) 44'; Pölöskei (yellow card) 45'; Nyilasi 50'; Pisanjuk 56'	Stadium: Városi Stadion; Attendance: 300; Referee: Róbert Nagy; Assistant referees: Dr. Zsolt Varga, Zoltán Pápai

28 November 2009 9	Nyíregyháza	2–3	Vasas	Nyíregyháza
13:00 CET (UTC+1)	Miskolczi (yellow card) 32'; Dosso 44'; Andorka 55'	Report	Remili 21'; Kovács (yellow card) 48'; Balog (yellow card) 53'; Dobrić 69'; Bakos (yellow card) 71', (goal) 80'	Stadium: Városi Stadion; Attendance: 300; Referee: László Varga; Assistant referees: Attila Kelemen, Gyula Fehér

5 December 2009 10	Diósgyőr	0–7	Nyíregyháza	Miskolc
13:00 CET (UTC+1)	Kodalaev (red card) 26'; Vukadinović (yellow card) 64'	Report	Andorka 2', 60', 70'; Honma 12'; Zabos (yellow card) 59'; Müller (yellow card) 62'; Pákolicz 81', 87'; Miskolczi 84'	Stadium: Diósgyőri Stadion; Attendance: 200; Referee: Gergő Király; Assistant referees: Tibor Gyarmati II, István Tóth

==== Second group stage ====
Pos	Team	Pld	W	D	L	GF	GA	GD	Pts	Qualification	DEB	VID	HON	NYI
1	Debrecen	6	5	1	0	17	4	+13	16	Advance to final	—	2–2	2–1	5–1
2	Videoton	6	3	2	1	7	5	+2	11		0–2	—	2–0	1–0
3	Honvéd	6	1	2	3	8	8	0	5		0–2	1–1	—	1–1
4	Nyíregyháza	6	0	1	5	2	17	−15	1		0–4	0–1	0–5	—

Source: Hungarian Football Federation

16 February 2010 1	Honvéd	1–1	Nyíregyháza	Budapest
14:00 CET (UTC+1)	Vukmir (yellow card) 87'; Palásthy 90+2'	Report	Davidov (yellow card) 8', (goal) 47'; Miskolczi (yellow card) 41'; Andorka (yellow card) 88'	Stadium: Bozsik József Stadion; Attendance: 200; Referee: István Vad; Assistant referees: Tibor Vígh, János Agócs

19 February 2010 2	Debrecen	5–1	Nyíregyháza	Debrecen
13:30 CET (UTC+1)	Coulibaly 6', 57', 66'; Rudolf 22'; Czvitkovics 26'; Laczkó (yellow card) 53'	Report	Miskolczi 18'	Stadium: Oláh Gábor utcai Stadion; Attendance: 1,000; Referee: Gábor Oláh; Assistant referees: Zsolt Márton, Gábor Varga Jr.

9 March 2010 3	Videoton	1–0	Nyíregyháza	Székesfehérvár
17:00 CET (UTC+1)	Horváth 2'; B. Farkas II (yellow card) 51'	Report	Nánási (yellow card) 60'; Müller (yellow card) 85'	Stadium: Sóstói Stadion; Attendance: 200; Referee: Gergely Sulyok; Assistant referees: Arnold Kepe, Balázs Kiss

17 March 2010 4	Nyíregyháza	0–5	Honvéd	Nyíregyháza
13:00 CET (UTC+1)		Report	Freud 8', 43'; Bojtor 32', 78'; Frizoni 89'	Stadium: Városi Stadion; Attendance: 200; Referee: Gyöngyi Gaál; Assistant referees: Zsolt Márton, Zsolt Butkai

30 March 2010 5	Nyíregyháza	0–4	Debrecen	Nyíregyháza
18:00 CEST (UTC+2)	Davidov (red card) 26'; Conteh-Lacalle (yellow card) 32'	Report	Bíró 17'; Etogo 36', 55'; Lucas 65'	Stadium: Városi Stadion; Attendance: 400; Referee: Róbert Nagy; Assistant referees: János Demeter, Tamás Márkus

7 April 2010 6	Nyíregyháza	0–1	Videoton	Nyíregyháza
14:00 CEST (UTC+2)	Müller (yellow card) 21'; Balbinot (yellow card) 74'	Report	Novaković 37'; Kocsis (yellow card) 69'; Radović (yellow card) 90'	Stadium: Városi Stadion; Attendance: 200; Referee: Gyöngyi Gaál; Assistant referees: Tibor Gyarmati II, Gábor Varga Jr.

== Statistics ==
=== Overall ===
Appearances (Apps) numbers are for appearances in competitive games only, including sub appearances.
Source: Competitions

No.	Player	Pos.	Nemzeti Bajnokság I				Magyar Kupa				Ligakupa				Total			
No.	Player	Pos.	Apps	Goal	Yellow card	Red card	Apps	Goal	Yellow card	Red card	Apps	Goal	Yellow card	Red card	Apps	Goal	Yellow card	Red card
1	(Serbia) Draško Vojinović	GK	19		2						3				22		2	
3	(Brazil) Diego Balbinot	DF	9		2						1		1		10		3	
3	(Romania) Claudiu Cornaci	DF	5			1									5			1
4	(Hungary) Balázs Nánási	DF	8		3	1					10	1	2		18	1	5	1
5	(Hungary) Attila Zabos	MF	22		8						4		1		26		9	
7	(Hungary) István Lakatos	DF	13				1				6				20			
8	(Hungary) László Bodnár	DF									2				2			
8	(Hungary) Zsolt Müller	MF	12				1		1		13	1	4		26	1	5	
9	(Hungary) Dávid Pákolicz	MF	21	2							8	3			29	5		
9	(North Macedonia) Aco Stojkov	FW	2												2			
10	(Hungary) Péter Andorka	FW	27	5	2		1				6	6	1		34	11	3	
10	(Serbia) Igor Bogdanović	FW	13	2											13	2		
11	(Hungary) Szilárd Éles	DF									4				4			
11	(Hungary) Tibor Márkus	FW	1				1				1				3			
11	(Montenegro) Petar Stanišić	DF	5		1	1					1				6		1	1
12	(Hungary) László Miskolczi	MF	29	2	8						5	2	2		34	4	10	
13	(Slovakia) Peter Struhár	DF	15	2	3						2				17	2	3	
14	(Hungary) Árpád Ambrusz	DF	5		1						3				8		1	
14	(Serbia) Milan Davidov	FW	12		2	1					3	1	1	1	15	1	3	2
16	(Hungary) Bence Bakos	MF					1				10		2		11		2	
18	(Cameroon) Yves Mboussi	DF	11		2	2	1		1		1		1		13		4	2
19	(France) Nacim Abdelali	FW	14	1	2						3		1		17	1	3	
20	(Hungary) Tibor Minczér	MF	12		6		1				10		1		23		7	
21	(Hungary) Tamás Szélpál	MF	4				1								5			
24	(Romania) Szabolcs Perenyi	DF	1								2				3			
25	(Hungary) József Bíró	—																
25	(Hungary) Viktor Bölcsföldi	FW					1				1	1			2	1		
25	(Estonia) Martin Hurt	DF	8		2						2				10		2	
25	(Hungary) Norbert Szilágyi	FW	1								3		1		4		1	
26	(Hungary) Dávid Oláh	DF									13		1		13		1	
27	(Slovakia) Károly Czanik	MF	5				1				2	2			8	2		
27	(Honduras) Luis Ramos	MF	1												1			
28	(Ivory Coast) Sindou Dosso	FW	14	2							4	2			18	4		
29	(Sierra Leone) Alfi Conteh-Lacalle	FW	3								3		1		6		1	
29	(Romania) Cosmin Goia	DF	13	1	5	1					2	1			15	2	5	1
33	(Hungary) Zoltán Kovács	DF	1		1										1		1	
33	(Ukraine) Volodymyr Ovsiyenko	GK	13								3				16			
34	(Hungary) József Csáki	DF									11		2		11		2	
34	(Romania) Cristian Danci	MF									1	2			1	2		
34	(Latvia) Jevgēņijs Kazura	DF									2				2			
35	(Serbia) Predrag Bošnjak	MF	11	1							2				13	1		
35	(Brazil) Leonardo Drugovich	MF									1				1			
35	(Brazil) Felipe Menezes	—									1				1			
35	(Hungary) Róbert Szentgyörgyi	—																
36	(Hungary) Kiran Bechan	MF									1				1			
36	(Hungary) Ádám Bencs	—									2				2			
36	(Hungary) István Makai	MF									4				4			
36	(Hungary) Tamás Torma	—									1				1			
37	(Hungary) Krisztián Varga	DF	11				1		1		10		2		22		3	
39	(Hungary) Gábor Bodó	DF									3				3			
39	(Hungary) Dávid Erdélyi	DF									2				2			
39	(Hungary) Márton Farkas	FW									9				9			
40	(Brazil) Leandro Alves	MF									1				1			
40	(Hungary) Szabolcs Gál	DF									1				1			
41	(Ukraine) Volodymyr Kozlenko	DF									1				1			
41	(Hungary) Roland Matejkó	MF									1				1			
41	(Hungary) Gergő Ráti	FW									4				4			
42	(Hungary) Gergely Simon	FW	1								4				5			
44	(Serbia) Željko Kovačević	DF	8	2							2				10	2		
45	(Japan) Kazuo Honma	FW	29	8	4						3	1			32	9	4	
66	(Hungary) Tibor Sánta	GK																
83	(Hungary) Zsolt Dénes	GK									7				7			
86	(Hungary) Zoltán Kiss	DF	12		2	1					1				13		2	1
88	(Hungary) Ádám Fekete	MF	7	1			1				9				17	1		
89	(Hungary) János Markos	MF									6	1	1		6	1	1	
90	(Hungary) Ferenc Gazsi	GK					1				4				5			
92	(Hungary) Balázs Batizi-Pócsi	FW	8		1		1				11	3			20	3	1	
93	(Hungary) Szabolcs Banka	FW									3				3			
99	(Algeria) Fouad Bouguerra	FW	12	10	2						1	3			13	13	2	
Own goals				2												2		
Totals				41	59	8			3			30	25	1		71	87	9

=== Hat-tricks ===
No.	Player	Against	Result	Date	Competition
99	(Algeria) Fouad Bouguerra	Haladás (H)	3–3	19 May 2010	Nemzeti Bajnokság I
99	(Algeria) Fouad Bouguerra	Zalaegerszeg (A)	4–3	22 May 2010	Nemzeti Bajnokság I

=== Clean sheets ===
			Clean sheets			
No.	Player	Games Played	Nemzeti Bajnokság I	Magyar Kupa	Ligakupa	Total
33	(Ukraine) Volodymyr Ovsiyenko	16	3		1	4
83	(Hungary) Zsolt Dénes	7			3	3
90	(Hungary) Ferenc Gazsi	5			2	2
1	(Serbia) Draško Vojinović	22				
66	(Hungary) Tibor Sánta					
Totals			3		6	9
