= 2009–10 Szombathelyi Haladás season =

Haladás
2009–10 season
- Owner: Local government (51%); HALMILL TEAM Tanácsadó Kft. (44%); Haladás Marketing Kft. (5%)
- Manager: Aurél Csertői (until 15 September 2009); Antal Róth (from 15 September)
- Stadium: Rohonci út
- Nemzeti Bajnokság I: 8th
- Magyar Kupa: Round of 16
- Ligakupa: Second group stage
- UEFA Europa League: Second qualifying round
- Highest home attendance: 9,000 v Ferencváros (26 August 2009, Nemzeti Bajnokság I)
- Lowest home attendance: 200 v Újpest (6 April 2010, Ligakupa)
- Average home league attendance: 4,267
- Biggest win: 4–0 v Paks (Home, 23 May 2010, Nemzeti Bajnokság I)
- Biggest defeat: 0–3 v IF Elfsborg (Away, 16 July 2009, UEFA Europa League); 0–3 v Kaposvár (Away, 2 August 2009, Nemzeti Bajnokság I); 0–3 v Zalaegerszeg (Away, 31 October 2009, Nemzeti Bajnokság I)

The 2009–10 season was Szombathelyi Haladás's 53rd competitive season, 2nd consecutive season in the Nemzeti Bajnokság I and 92nd year in existence as a football club. In addition to the domestic league, Haladás participated in that season's editions of the Magyar Kupa, the Ligakupa and the UEFA Europa League.

== Squad ==
Squad at end of season

Note: Flags indicate national team as defined under FIFA eligibility rules; some limited exceptions apply. Players may hold more than one non-FIFA nationality.

| No. | Pos. | Nation | Player |
|---|---|---|---|
| 1 | GK | HUN | Tamás Szép |
| 2 | MF | HUN | Zoltán Csontos |
| 4 | MF | HUN | Gábor Rajos |
| 6 | DF | HUN | Dániel Lengyel |
| 7 | MF | HUN | Balázs Molnár |
| 8 | FW | HUN | Gábor Nagy |
| 9 | FW | HUN | Márton Oross |
| 10 | MF | HUN | István Kovács |
| 11 | MF | HUN | Ignác Irhás |
| 12 | DF | HUN | Szilárd Devecseri |
| 13 | MF | HUN | Péter Halmosi |
| 14 | FW | HUN | Roland Ugrai |
| 15 | DF | HUN | Péter Tóth |
| 16 | FW | HUN | Máté Skriba |
| 17 | FW | HUN | Attila Simon |

| No. | Pos. | Nation | Player |
|---|---|---|---|
| 18 | MF | HUN | Norbert Sipos |
| 20 | FW | HUN | Krisztián Kenesei |
| 21 | MF | SEN | El Hadji Diouf |
| 22 | DF | HUN | Richárd Guzmics |
| 23 | MF | HUN | Szabolcs Schimmer |
| 25 | MF | HUN | Zsolt Kovács |
| 27 | DF | FRA | Jean-Baptiste Paternotte |
| 30 | GK | HUN | Gergő Gőcze |
| 32 | FW | HUN | Ferenc Rácz |
| 46 | MF | HUN | Ádám Simon |
| 55 | MF | SRB | Igor Bogdanović |
| 66 | GK | HUN | Dániel Rózsa |
| 77 | DF | HUN | Attila Kuttor |
| 84 | MF | HUN | Norbert Lattenstein |
| 90 | MF | HUN | Bence Iszlai |

== Competitions ==
=== Overview ===
| Competition | First match | Last match | Starting round | Final position | Record | | | | | | | |
| Competition | First match | Last match | Starting round | Final position | Pld | W | D | L | GF | GA | GD | Win % |
|---|---|---|---|---|---|---|---|---|---|---|---|---|
| Nemzeti Bajnokság I | 2 August 2009 | 23 May 2010 | Matchday 1 | 8th | 30 | 10 | 9 | 11 | 46 | 49 | −3 | 33.33 |
| Magyar Kupa | 30 September 2009 | 28 October 2009 | Round of 32 | Round of 16 | 3 | 1 | 1 | 1 | 2 | 3 | −1 | 33.33 |
| Ligakupa | 19 February 2010 | 6 April 2010 | Second group stage | Second group stage | 6 | 1 | 3 | 2 | 9 | 9 | +0 | 16.67 |
| UEFA Europa League | 2 July 2009 | 23 July 2009 | First qualifying round | Second qualifying round | 4 | 1 | 1 | 2 | 2 | 5 | −3 | 25.00 |
| Total | | | | | 43 | 13 | 14 | 16 | 59 | 66 | −7 | 30.23 |

Source: Competitions

=== Nemzeti Bajnokság I ===
==== League table ====
| Pos | Team | Pld | W | D | L | GF | GA | GD | Pts |
|---|---|---|---|---|---|---|---|---|---|
| 6 | MTK | 30 | 12 | 7 | 11 | 52 | 41 | +11 | 43 |
| 7 | Ferencváros | 30 | 10 | 11 | 9 | 34 | 35 | −1 | 41 |
| 8 | Haladás | 30 | 10 | 9 | 11 | 46 | 49 | −3 | 39 |
| 9 | Honvéd | 30 | 9 | 11 | 10 | 38 | 35 | +3 | 38 |
| 10 | Kecskemét | 30 | 10 | 7 | 13 | 50 | 56 | −6 | 37 |

Source: soccerway.com
Rules for classification: 1st points; 2nd overall wins; 3rd goal difference; 4th goals scored

==== Results summary ====
| Overall | | | | | | | | Home | | | | | | Away | | | | | |
| Pld | W | D | L | GF | GA | GD | Pts | W | D | L | GF | GA | GD | W | D | L | GF | GA | GD |
|---|---|---|---|---|---|---|---|---|---|---|---|---|---|---|---|---|---|---|---|
| 30 | 10 | 9 | 11 | 46 | 49 | −3 | 39 | 7 | 4 | 4 | 28 | 22 | +6 | 3 | 5 | 7 | 18 | 27 | −9 |

Source: Hungarian Football Federation

==== Results by round ====
| Round | 1 | 2 | 3 | 4 | 5 | 6 | 7 | 8 | 9 | 10 | 11 | 12 | 13 | 14 | 15 | 16 | 17 | 18 | 19 | 20 | 21 | 22 | 23 | 24 | 25 | 26 | 27 | 28 | 29 | 30 |
|---|---|---|---|---|---|---|---|---|---|---|---|---|---|---|---|---|---|---|---|---|---|---|---|---|---|---|---|---|---|---|
| Ground | H | A | H | A | H | A | H | H | H | A | H | H | A | H | A | A | H | A | H | A | H | A | A | A | H | A | A | H | A | H |
| Result | D | L | L | L | W | L | L | D | W | W | D | L | L | W | L | L | W | D | L | L | W | D | W | W | W | D | D | D | D | W |
| Position | 9 | 13 | 15 | 16 | 15 | 16 | 16 | 16 | 14 | 9 | 12 | 13 | 15 | 12 | 12 | 12 | 12 | 12 | 13 | 14 | 13 | 12 | 10 | 10 | 7 | 7 | 8 | 8 | 8 | 8 |
| Points | 1 | 1 | 1 | 1 | 4 | 4 | 4 | 5 | 8 | 11 | 12 | 12 | 12 | 15 | 15 | 15 | 18 | 19 | 19 | 19 | 22 | 23 | 26 | 29 | 32 | 33 | 34 | 35 | 36 | 39 |

Source: Matches
A = Away; H = Home; W = Win; D = Draw; L = Loss

==== Matches ====
| 2 August 2009 2 | Kaposvár | 3–0 | Haladás | Kaposvár |
| 20:00 CEST (UTC+2) | Zahorecz (yellow card) 43', (goal) 88'; Petrók 58', (yellow card) 83'; Z. Farkas (yellow card) 62'; Reszli 77' | Report | Skriba (yellow card) 23'; Irhás (yellow card) 70' | Stadium: Rákóczi Stadion; Attendance: 2,500; Referee: József Berger; Assistant referees: Attila Forgács, Gábor Kormányos II; Fourth official: Gábor Fajkusz |

| 9 August 2009 3 | Haladás | 2–4 | MTK | Szombathely |
| 20:00 CEST (UTC+2) | P. Tóth 4'; Lattenstein 16'; Schimmer (yellow card) 43'; G. Nagy (yellow card) 44' | Report | Vadnai (yellow card) 22'; Pátkai (yellow card) 38'; Rodenbücher (yellow card) 38'; Lencse 53', 87', (yellow card) 61'; Könyves 57'; Gosztonyi 73' | Stadium: Rohonci út Attendance: 4,000; Referee: Sándor Andó-Szabó; Assistant referees: György Ring, László Viszokai; Fourth official: J. Zoltán Kovács |

| 14 August 2009 4 | Debrecen | 2–1 | Haladás | Debrecen |
| 19:00 CEST (UTC+2) | Leandro 2', (yellow card) 89'; Czvitkovics 63' | Report | G. Nagy (yellow card) 21'; Skriba (yellow card) 59'; Ugrai 75'; P. Tóth (yellow card) 90' | Stadium: Oláh Gábor utcai Stadion; Attendance: 5,000; Referee: István Vad; Assistant referees: György Ring, Zsolt Szpisják; Fourth official: Balázs Berke |

| 23 August 2009 5 | Haladás | 4–3 | Videoton | Szombathely |
| 20:00 CEST (UTC+2) | Schimmer 1'; Kenesei 33'; Oross 44'; G. Nagy 88' | Report | Anđić 12'; Sitku (yellow card) 31', (goal) 34', 58'; B. Farkas (yellow card) 52'; Lázár (yellow card) 61'; Lipták (red card) 90+5' | Stadium: Rohonci út Attendance: 5,000; Referee: Péter Solymosi; Assistant referees: Oszkár Lémon, Gábor Takács; Fourth official: Dávid Ákos |

| 26 August 2009 1 | Haladás | 0–0 | Ferencváros | Szombathely |
| 19:00 CEST (UTC+2) | G. Nagy (yellow card) 27'; Guzmics (yellow card) 49'; Irhás (yellow card) 77'; Kenesei (yellow card) 87' | Report | Zo. Balog (yellow card) 81' | Stadium: Rohonci út Attendance: 9,000; Referee: Viktor Kassai; Assistant referees: Gábor Erős, Zsolt Butkai; Fourth official: Tibor Farkas |

| 30 August 2009 6 | Újpest | 3–1 | Haladás | Budapest |
| 17:30 CEST (UTC+2) | Kabát 73', (yellow card) 90+1'; Kéthévoama 81'; N. Tóth (yellow card) 88'; Sándor 89', (red card) 90'; Korcsmár (yellow card) 90+2' | Report | Rajos 28'; P. Tóth (yellow card) 50'; G. Nagy (yellow card) 71'; Irhás (yellow card) 83' | Stadium: Szusza Ferenc Stadion; Attendance: 3,078; Referee: Zsolt Szabó; Assistant referees: Róbert Kispál, György Ring; Fourth official: Tibor Gyarmati II |

| 12 September 2009 7 | Haladás | 1–2 | Győr | Szombathely |
| 17:30 CEST (UTC+2) | Kenesei (yellow card) 63', (goal) 90+2' (pen.); Guzmics (yellow card) 88' | Report | Nicorec 24'; Stanišić (yellow card) 73'; Józsi 78'; Dudás (yellow card) 90+1' | Stadium: Rohonci út Attendance: 4,000; Referee: Péter Solymosi; Assistant referees: Gábor Takács, Arnold Kepe; Fourth official: Norbert Kiss |

| 19 September 2009 8 | Haladás | 3–3 | Kecskemét | Szombathely |
| 19:00 CEST (UTC+2) | Lattenstein 33'; G. Nagy 51'; Kuttor 61'; Skriba (yellow card) 90' | Report | Alempijević (yellow card) 45'; Csordás 48'; Mbengono 57'; Bertus 68'; Koszó (yellow card) 78'; Koller (yellow card) 90' | Stadium: Rohonci út Attendance: 4,000; Referee: Roland Veizer; Assistant referees: Péter Berettyán, Róbert Horváth; Fourth official: Balázs Böcskei |

| 26 September 2009 9 | Haladás | 2–1 | Diósgyőr | Szombathely |
| 19:00 CEST (UTC+2) | Oross 29'; G. Nagy (yellow card) 72'; Irhás 88'; Lattenstein (yellow card) 89' | Report | Lipusz 54'; Kállai (yellow card) 72'; Huszák (yellow card) 79' | Stadium: Rohonci út Attendance: 4,000; Referee: Viktor Kassai; Assistant referees: Tibor Vámos, Zsolt Márton; Fourth official: J. Zoltán Kovács |

| 3 October 2009 10 | Pápa | 1–3 | Haladás | Pápa |
| 19:00 CEST (UTC+2) | Rajnay (yellow card) 50'; Gyömbér 59'; Orosz (yellow card) 67'; S. Nagy (red card) 79' | Report | Lattenstein 2'; Oross 31'; Schimmer (yellow card) 51'; Skriba (yellow card) 75'; Rácz 88' | Stadium: Perutz Stadion; Attendance: 4,000; Referee: Ferenc Bede; Assistant referees: Zsolt Butkai, Arnold Kepe; Fourth official: Gergely Szőts |

| 17 October 2009 11 | Haladás | 2–2 | Honvéd | Szombathely |
| 18:00 CEST (UTC+2) | Oross 5'; A. Simon II 47'; Rajos (yellow card) 68' | Report | Botiș 16'; Hrepka (yellow card) 37', (goal) 82'; Hidi (yellow card) 60'; Macko (yellow card) 90+1' | Stadium: Rohonci út Attendance: 3,500; Referee: Szabolcs Szilasi; Assistant referees: Gábor Takács, Gábor Gyürüsi; Fourth official: Dániel Becséri |

| 24 October 2009 12 | Haladás | 0–1 | Vasas | Szombathely |
| 17:00 CEST (UTC+2) | P. Tóth (yellow card) 41'; I. Kovács (yellow card) 73' | Report | Zs. Balog (yellow card) 40', (goal) 80' | Stadium: Rohonci út Attendance: 3,500; Referee: Gergly Sulyok; Assistant referees: Zsolt Márton, Arnold Kepe; Fourth official: József Erdős |

| 31 October 2009 13 | Zalaegerszeg | 3–0 | Haladás | Zalaegerszeg |
| 17:00 CET (UTC+1) | Rudņevs 9', 25'; Pavićević 53' (pen.); Sluka (yellow card) 90+1' | Report | P. Tóth (yellow card) 52' | Stadium: ZTE Arena; Attendance: 7,472; Referee: Péter Solymosi; Assistant referees: Oszkár Lémon, Gábor Takács; Fourth official: Balázs Böcskei |

| 7 November 2009 14 | Haladás | 2–0 | Nyíregyháza | Szombathely |
| 16:00 CET (UTC+1) | Á. Simon 20'; P. Tóth 70'; Kuttor (yellow card) 90+4'; Rajos (yellow card) 90+7' | Report | Miskolczi (yellow card) 33' | Stadium: Rohonci út Attendance: 2,000; Referee: Ádám Németh; Assistant referees: Vencel Tóth II, Balázs Farkas; Fourth official: Gergő Király |

| 21 November 2009 15 | Paks | 2–0 | Haladás | Paks |
| 16:00 CET (UTC+1) | Böde 80', (yellow card) 90'; Éger 85'; Tököli (yellow card) 85'; T. Kiss (yellow card) 88' | Report | Rácz (yellow card) 62'; B. Molnár (yellow card) 75' | Stadium: Fehérvári úti Stadion; Attendance: 1,000; Referee: Sándor Andó-Szabó; Assistant referees: Attila Forgács, István Iványi; Fourth official: Tibor Gyarmati II |

| 27 February 2010 16 | Ferencváros | 2–1 | Haladás | Budapest |
| 15:00 CET (UTC+1) | Stockley (yellow card) 36'; Ferenczi 45' (pen.); Csizmadia (yellow card) 65'; Elding 88' | Report | Guzmics (yellow card) 16'; Halmosi 31' | Stadium: Stadion Albert Flórián; Attendance: 0 Referee: Sándor Andó-Szabó; Assistant referees: Zsolt Szpisják, János Medovarszki; Fourth official: József Erdős |

| 5 March 2010 17 | Haladás | 2–1 | Kaposvár | Szombathely |
| 19:00 CET (UTC+1) | Bogdanović 22' (pen.), 78'; B. Molnár (yellow card) 35'; Á. Simon (yellow card) 66'; D. Lengyel (yellow card) 68'; Halmosi (yellow card) 84'; Diouf (yellow card) 90+1' | Report | Aílton (yellow card) 21'; Ukwuoma (yellow card) 33'; Antanasijević (yellow card) 60'; Stanić 71' | Stadium: Rohonci út Attendance: 2,000; Referee: István Vad; Assistant referees: Róbert Kispál, Zsolt Márton; Fourth official: Gergő Király |

| 13 March 2010 18 | MTK | 0–0 | Haladás | Budapest |
| 14:30 CET (UTC+1) | Á. Szabó (red card) 83' | Report | Guzmics (yellow card) 74' | Stadium: Hidegkuti Nándor Stadion; Attendance: 500; Referee: Gábor Oláh; Assistant referees: Balázs Farkas, Zsolt Butkai; Fourth official: Gergő Janitz |

| 19 March 2010 19 | Haladás | 0–2 | Debrecen | Szombathely |
| 19:00 CET (UTC+1) | Halmosi (yellow card) 37' | Report | Rudolf (yellow card) 47'; Czvitkovics 68'; Feczesin 75' | Stadium: Rohonci út Attendance: 4,000; Referee: Gergely Sulyok; Assistant referees: Gábor Erős, Tibor Vámos; Fourth official: Szabolcs Fenyvesi |

| 26 March 2010 20 | Videoton | 4–2 | Haladás | Székesfehérvár |
| 19:00 CET (UTC+1) | Radović (yellow card) 8'; Guzmics 30', 55' (o.g.); Nikolić 36', 38'; Lencse (yellow card) 86' | Report | Halmosi (yellow card) 37'; Á. Simon (yellow card) 53'; P. Tóth 71' (pen.); Oross 80' | Stadium: Sóstói Stadion; Attendance: 3,266; Referee: Zoltán Iványi; Assistant referees: István Albert, János Medovarszki; Fourth official: Gábor Fajkusz |

| 3 April 2010 21 | Haladás | 1–0 | Újpest | Szombathely |
| 15:00 CEST (UTC+2) | G. Nagy 46', (yellow card) 64' | Report | Pollák (red card) 32'; Kabát (yellow card) 49' | Stadium: Rohonci út Attendance: 5,000; Referee: Sándor Andó-Szabó; Assistant referees: György Ring, István Tóth; Fourth official: Gergő Janitz |

| 10 April 2010 22 | Győr | 1–1 | Haladás | Győr |
| 18:00 CEST (UTC+2) | Józsi 17' (pen.); Fehér (yellow card) 37' | Report | D. Lengyel (yellow card) 17'; P. Tóth (yellow card) 20', (goal) 38' (pen.); Sipos (yellow card) 55'; Schimmer (yellow card) 81' | Stadium: ETO Park; Attendance: 3,000; Referee: Gábor Oláh; Assistant referees: Róbert Kispál, János Demeter; Fourth official: Balázs Berke |

| 17 April 2010 23 | Kecskemét | 2–3 | Haladás | Kecskemét |
| 16:30 CEST (UTC+2) | Némedi (yellow card) 49', (goal) 70'; I. Farkas 56'; Gyagya (yellow card) 77'; Montvai (yellow card) 90+3' | Report | Sipos 31'; G. Nagy 47', 62'; B. Molnár (yellow card) 66'; Oross (yellow card) 90+2' | Stadium: Széktói Stadion; Attendance: 5,000; Referee: Gergely Sulyok; Assistant referees: István Albert, János Medovarszki; Fourth official: Szabolcs Fenyvesi |

| 25 April 2010 24 | Diósgyőr | 1–3 | Haladás | Miskolc |
| 18:00 CEST (UTC+2) | Sadjo (yellow card) 32'; Búrány (yellow card) 36'; Menougong 61' | Report | G. Nagy 14'; Sipos (yellow card) 31'; Á. Simon (yellow card) 32'; Oross (yellow card) 51', (goal) 54'; Guzmics 86' | Stadium: Diósgyőri Stadion; Attendance: 3,000; Referee: Roland Veizer; Assistant referees: Péter Berettyán, Róbert Horváth; Fourth official: László Varga |

| 1 May 2010 25 | Haladás | 4–2 | Pápa | Szombathely |
| 18:00 CEST (UTC+2) | P. Tóth 23' (pen.); Halmosi 29'; Sipos (yellow card) 35'; Iszlai (yellow card) 73'; Kenesei 81' (pen.), 87' | Report | Szűcs (yellow card) 22'; Jovánczai 30'; G. Tóth (yellow card) 46'; Abwo (yellow card) 69'; G. Varga (yellow card) 69'; Á. Simon 75' (o.g.); A. Farkas (yellow card) 80'; Sarus (red card) 80' | Stadium: Rohonci út Attendance: 6,000; Referee: István Vad; Assistant referees: Vencel Tóth II, Arnold Kepe; Fourth official: Balázs Böcskei |

| 5 May 2010 26 | Honvéd | 0–0 | Haladás | Budapest |
| 18:00 CEST (UTC+2) | Akassou (yellow card) 32' | Report | Schimmer (yellow card) 54'; Guzmics (yellow card) 61'; P. Tóth (yellow card) 64' | Stadium: Bozsik József Stadion; Attendance: 1,500; Referee: János Takács; Assistant referees: László Viszokai, Lajos L. Tóth; Fourth official: Gergely Szőts |

| 8 May 2010 27 | Vasas | 0–0 | Haladás | Budapest |
| 18:00 CEST (UTC+2) | Pavičević (yellow card) 57'; Dobrić (red card) 62'; Hrepka (red card) 65'; Mileusnić (yellow card) 69' | Report | Á. Simon (yellow card) 35'; P. Tóth (yellow card) 76' | Stadium: Illovszky Rudolf Stadion; Attendance: 1,000; Referee: J. Zoltán Kovács; Assistant referees: Gábor Takács, Gábor Gyürüsi; Fourth official: Dániel Becséri |

| 16 May 2010 28 | Haladás | 1–1 | Zalaegerszeg | Szombathely |
| 17:30 CEST (UTC+2) | Kenesei 18'; Oross (yellow card) 54'; D. Lengyel (yellow card) 66'; P. Tóth (yellow card) 68'; B. Molnár (yellow card) 74' | Report | Miljatovič (yellow card) 14'; An. Horváth (yellow card) 31'; Magasföldi (yellow card) 46'; Rudņevs 57' | Stadium: Rohonci út Attendance: 4,000; Referee: Zsolt Szabó; Assistant referees: Róbert Kispál, György Ring; Fourth official: József Erdős |

| 19 May 2010 29 | Nyíregyháza | 3–3 | Haladás | Nyíregyháza |
| 18:00 CEST (UTC+2) | Minczér (yellow card) 25'; Balbinot (yellow card) 44'; Vojinović (yellow card) 61'; Bouguerra 65', 71', 81' | Report | G. Nagy (yellow card) 16'; Á. Simon 34'; A. Simon II 45'; B. Molnár 62', (yellow card) 83'; P. Tóth (yellow card) 81'; D. Lengyel (yellow card) 89' | Stadium: Városi Stadion; Attendance: 2,000; Referee: Zoltán Iványi; Assistant referees: István Albert, János Medovarszki; Fourth official: Gábor Fajkusz |

| 23 May 2010 30 | Haladás | 4–0 | Paks | Szombathely |
| 17:30 CEST (UTC+2) | D. Lengyel 15', (yellow card) 89'; Halmosi 29'; Oross 41'; Irhás 75'; Iszlai (yellow card) 87' | Report | Sipeki (yellow card) 28'; J. Szabó (yellow card) 33'; Böde (red card) 37' | Stadium: Rohonci út Attendance: 4,000; Referee: József Berger; Assistant referees: Tamás Péter, Brigitta Makkosné Petz; Fourth official: Balázs Böcskei |

=== Magyar Kupa ===
| 30 September 2009 Round of 32 | Baja | 0–1 | Haladás | Baja |
| 15:00 CEST (UTC+2) | Zsók (yellow card) 83' | Report | G. Nagy 19'; Rajos (yellow card) 24'; Oross (yellow card) 64'; Guzmics (yellow card) 79' | Stadium: Városi Sporttelep; Attendance: 600; Referee: Gábor Fajkusz; Assistant referees: Gábor Kormányos II, Kornél Orosz |

==== Round of 16 ====
| 20 October 2009 First leg | Haladás | 0–2 | Zalaegerszeg | Szombathely |
| 18:00 CEST (UTC+2) | Iszlai (yellow card) 18' | Report | An. Horváth 9'; Rudņevs 85' | Stadium: Rohonci út Attendance: 2,000; Referee: Tamás Arany; Assistant referees: Tamás Péter, Roland Hofbauer |

| 28 October 2009 Second leg | Zalaegerszeg | 1–1 (3–1 agg.) | Haladás | Zalaegerszeg |
| 18:00 CET (UTC+1) | Todorović 25'; Bogunović (yellow card) 40'; Sluka (yellow card) 79' | Report | Devecseri (yellow card) 27'; G. Nagy 34'; A. Simon II (yellow card) 40'; Gyurján (yellow card) 70' | Stadium: ZTE Arena; Attendance: 2,100; Referee: Gábor Barna; Assistant referees: István Iványi, Balázs Kiss |
Note: Zalaegerszeg won 3–1 on aggregate.

=== Ligakupa ===
==== Second group stage ====
| Pos | Team | Pld | W | D | L | GF | GA | GD | Pts | Qualification | PAK | HAL | UTE | FER |
|---|---|---|---|---|---|---|---|---|---|---|---|---|---|---|
| 1 | Paks | 6 | 3 | 3 | 0 | 9 | 6 | +3 | 12 | Advance to final | — | 3–2 | 2–1 | 1–1 |
| 2 | Haladás | 6 | 1 | 3 | 2 | 9 | 9 | 0 | 6 | | 0–0 | — | 2–2 | 4–1 |
| 3 | Újpest | 6 | 1 | 3 | 2 | 6 | 6 | 0 | 6 | | 1–1 | 2–0 | — | 0–1 |
| 4 | Ferencváros | 6 | 1 | 3 | 2 | 5 | 8 | −3 | 6 | | 1–2 | 1–1 | 0–0 | — |

Source: Hungarian Football Federation

| 19 February 2010 2 | Paks | 3–2 | Haladás | Paks |
| 14:00 CET (UTC+1) | I. Nagy 8'; Le. Horváth (yellow card) 37'; Éger 51' (pen.); Gévay (yellow card) 59'; J. Szabó (yellow card) 71'; T. Kiss (yellow card) 74'; Tököli (yellow card) 85'; Vayer 89' | Report | G. Nagy 31'; Halmosi (yellow card) 35'; Bogdanović 45' (pen.); Guzmics (yellow card) 49'; Iszlai (yellow card) 88' | Stadium: Fehérvári úti Stadion; Attendance: 200; Referee: J. Zoltán Kovács; Assistant referees: Gábor Gyürüsi, Milán Mohos |

| 23 February 2010 5 | Haladás | 0–0 | Paks | Szombathely |
| 14:00 CET (UTC+1) | | Report | | Stadium: Rohonci út Attendance: 300; Referee: Péter Solymosi; Assistant referees: Gábor Takács, Balázs Kiss |

| 9 March 2010 3 | Újpest | 2–0 | Haladás | Budapest |
| 18:00 CET (UTC+1) | Martin 24'; R. Varga 74' | Report | A. Simon II (yellow card) 37' | Stadium: Szusza Ferenc Stadion; Attendance: 200; Referee: Ádám Németh; Assistant referees: Tibor Vígh, János Agócs |

| 16 March 2010 4 | Ferencváros | 1–1 | Haladás | Budapest |
| 19:00 CET (UTC+1) | Wolfe 39'; Gárdos (yellow card) 82'; Sváb (yellow card) 87' | Report | Diouf (yellow card) 67'; Iszlai 90' | Stadium: Stadion Albert Flórián; Attendance: 200; Referee: János Takács; Assistant referees: Lajos L. Tóth, Gábor Kormányos II |

| 23 March 2010 1 | Haladás | 4–1 | Ferencváros | Szombathely |
| 20:00 CET (UTC+1) | Kuttor (yellow card) 20'; Lattenstein (yellow card) 42'; Kenesei 44'; A. Simon II 53'; Paternotte (yellow card) 64'; Irhás 66'; Skriba 79'; A. Szakály (yellow card) 87' | Report | Lipcsei 65' (pen.); Ahmed (yellow card) 82'; Pastor (red card) 88' | Stadium: Rohonci út Attendance: 400; Referee: Szabolcs Szilasi; Assistant referees: Gábor Gyürüsi, Milán Mohos |

| 6 April 2010 6 | Haladás | 2–2 | Újpest | Szombathely |
| 18:00 CEST (UTC+2) | Irhás 76'; Iszlai 86' (pen.); Z. Nagy II (yellow card) 87' | Report | Electo 71', (yellow card) 72'; Rajczi 81' (pen.); Privigyei (yellow card) 85'; Magos (yellow card) 88' | Stadium: Rohonci út Attendance: 200; Referee: Gábor Oláh; Assistant referees: Balázs Farkas, Balázs Kiss |

=== UEFA Europa League ===
==== Qualifying rounds ====
===== First qualifying round =====
| 2 July 2009 First leg | Haladás (Hungary) | 1–0 | (Kazakhstan) Irtysh | Szombathely, Hungary |
| 19:00 CEST (UTC+2) | Rajos (yellow card) 78'; Kenesei 79' | Report | Andreev (yellow card) 32'; Shomko (yellow card) 48'; Parkhamchuk (yellow card) 72'; Sobolev (yellow card) 85' | Stadium: Rohonci út Attendance: 3,500; Referee: Albano Janku (Albania); Assistant referees: Denis Rexha (Albania), Proletar Puto (Albania); Fourth official: Lorenc Jemini (Albania) |

| 9 July 2009 Second leg | Irtysh (Kazakhstan) | 2–1 (2–2 (a) agg.) | (Hungary) Haladás | Karagandy, Kazakhstan (Note: The match was played at the Shakhtyor Stadium in Karagandy, instead of Irtysh regular stadium, the Pavlodar Central Stadium in Pavlodar, which did not meet UEFA requirements.) |
| 19:00 (UTC+6) | Yurin 20'; Rajos 36' (o.g.) | Report | Chernyshov 24' (o.g.); Vörös (yellow card) 35'; Oross (yellow card) 85' | Stadium: Shakhtyor Stadium; Attendance: 1,2000; Referee: Halis Özkahya (Turkey); Assistant referees: Serkan Ok (Turkey), Erdinç Sezertam (Turkey); Fourth official: Koray Gençerler (Turkey) |
Note: 2–2 on aggregate. Haladás won on away goals.

===== Second qualifying round =====
| 16 July 2009 First leg | IF Elfsborg (Sweden) | 3–0 | (Hungary) Haladás | Borås, Sweden |
| 19:00 CEST (UTC+2) | Wikström (yellow card) 36'; Keene (yellow card) 51'; Svensson 60'; Ishizaki 82'; Avdić 89' | Report | B. Molnár (yellow card) 27'; Iszlai (yellow card) 48' | Stadium: Borås Arena; Attendance: 3,187; Referee: Calum Murray (Scotland); Assistant referees: Keith Sorbie (Scotland), Stuart Macaulay (Scotland); Fourth official: Brian Colvin (Scotland) |

| 23 July 2009 Second leg | Haladás (Hungary) | 0–0 (0–3 agg.) | (Sweden) IF Elfsborg | Szombathely, Hungary |
| 19:00 CEST (UTC+2) | P. Tóth (yellow card) 31' | Report | J. Florén (yellow card) 85'; Daníelsson (yellow card) 88' | Stadium: Rohonci út Attendance: 2,500; Referee: João Ferreira (Portugal); Assistant referees: Jose Cardinal (Portugal), Venâncio Tomé (Portugal); Fourth official: Paulo Batista (Portugal) |
Note: IF Elfsborg won 3–0 on aggregate.
