= Yevseyev =

Yevseyev (Russian: Евсе́ев; masculine) or Yevseyeva (Евсе́ева; feminine) is a Russian surname. Variants of this surname include Avseyev/Avseyeva (Авсе́ев/Авсе́ева), Avseyenko (Авсе́енко), Avseykin/Avseykina (Авсе́йкин/Авсе́йкина), Avsyukov/Avsyukova (Авсюко́в/Авсюко́ва), Aseyev/Aseyeva (Асе́ев/Асе́ева), Yevsevenko (Евсеве́нко), Yevsevyev/Yevsevyeva (Евсе́вьев/Евсе́вьева), Yevseyenko (Евсе́енко), Yevseichev/Yevseicheva (Евсе́ичев/Евсе́ичева), Yevseykin/Yevseykina (Евсе́йкин/Евсе́йкина), Yevsenov/Yevsenova (Евсе́нов/Евсе́нова), Yevsyonochkin/Yevsyonochkina (Евсёночкин/Евсёночкина), Ovseyev/Ovseyeva (Овсе́ев/Овсе́ева), and Ovsiyenko (Овсие́нко).

All these surnames derive from various forms of the Christian male first name Yevsevy, or its colloquial form Yevsey (or Avsey), which is of Greek origins where it means pious, devout.

Surnames Yevsikov/Yevsikova (Е́всиков/Е́всикова), Yevsyukov/Yevsyukova (Евсюко́в/Евсюко́ва), Yevsyunin/Yevsyunina (Евсю́нин/Евсю́нина), Yevsyutin/Yevsyutina (Евсю́тин/Евсю́тина), Yevsyutkin/Yevsyutkina (Евсю́ткин/Евсю́ткина), Yevsyukhin/Yevsyukhina (Евсю́хин/Евсю́хина), Yevsyushin/Yevsyushina (Евсю́шин/Евсю́шина), and Yevsyushkin/Yevsyushkina (Евсю́шкин/Евсю́шкина) may have derived either from "Yevsey", or from Christian male first names Yevstafy or Yevstigney.

== People with the surname ==
- Alexey Yevseyev (b. 1994), Russian association football player
- Denis Yevseyev (b. 1993), Kazakh tennis player
- Inna Yevseyeva (b. 1964), Soviet female middle distance runner
- Nikolay Yevseyev (b. 1966), Russian Olympic swimmer
- Vadim Evseev (Vadim Yevseyev) (b. 1976), Russian association football player
- Vasyl Yevseyev (1962–2010), Ukrainian association football coach and player
- Vladimir Yevseyev (1939–2012), Soviet rower
- Vladislav Evseev (Yevseyev) (b. 1984), Russian ice hockey player
- Willi Evseev (Yevseyev) (b. 1992), German association football player
- Yekaterina Yevseyeva (b. 1988), Kazakhstani high jumper
- Yevhen Yevseyev (b. 1987), Ukrainian association football player

== Toponyms ==
- Yevseyev (rural locality), a rural locality (a khutor) in Krasnogvardeysky District of Belgorod Oblast, Russia

== See also ==
- Yevseyevo, several rural localities in Russia
