= List of Estonian football transfers winter 2009–10 =

This is a list of Estonian winter football transfers between the 2009 and 2010 seasons.

The winter transfer window in Estonia opens on January 10 or if the date happens to be in the weekend, on the next available weekday, which in 2010 was January 11. For international transfers, the window closed on February 28 at 17:00. Local transfers had to be completed the day before the first match in the league.

== Meistriliiga ==
=== Flora ===
In	From
(Georgia (country)) Alekxandre Abashidze	(Georgia (country)) Garga Tbilisi
(Estonia) Rauno Alliku	(Estonia) Tulevik
(Georgia (country)) Zakaria Beglarishvili	(Georgia (country)) Lokomotivi Tbilisi
(Estonia) Jürgen Henn	(Estonia) Tulevik
(Estonia) Aleksei Jahhimovitš	(Estonia) Tulevik
(Estonia) Siim Luts	(Estonia) Tulevik
(Estonia) Marko Meerits	(Estonia) Flora II
(Estonia) Meelis Peitre	(Estonia) Flora II
(Estonia) Albert Taar	(Estonia) Tulevik
(Estonia) Andrei Veis	(Estonia) Tulevik

Out	To
(Georgia (country)) Ernest Akhalbedašvili	(Estonia) Flora II
(Estonia) Mihkel Aksalu	(England) Sheffield United
(Estonia) Ken Kallaste	(Estonia) Kalju
(Estonia) Jürgen Kuresoo	(Estonia) Sillamäe Kalev
(Estonia) Alen Stepanjan	(Latvia) Jaunība (loan)
(Estonia) Tõnis Vanna	(Sweden) Syrianska
(Estonia) Martin Vunk	(Sweden) Syrianska (loan)
(Estonia) Vjatšeslav Zahovaiko	(Portugal) U.D. Leiria

=== Kalju ===
In	From
(Brazil) (Italy) Giovani Albani Alemão	(Italy) Pro Patria
(Portugal) Bruno Gomes	(Mexico) Veracruz B
(Estonia) Jüri Jevdokimov	(Estonia) Tulevik
(Estonia) Deniss Jõgiste	(Estonia) Ajax Lasnamäe
(Estonia) Ken Kallaste	(Estonia) Flora
(Estonia) Dmitri Kovtunovitš	(Estonia) Kalju II
(Estonia) Rait Kuusk	Unemployed
(Estonia) Anti Kõlu	(Estonia) Tallinna Kalev (loan return)
(Japan) Hiroyuki Mitsuyama	Unknown
(Mexico) Adriel Ochoa	(Mexico) Leones Negros UdeG
(Brazil) (Italy) Tiago Sala	(Brazil) Veranópolis
(Estonia) Tanel Võtti	(Estonia) Tulevik

Out	To
(Brazil) Diego Balbinot	(Hungary) Nyíregyháza Spartacus
(Estonia) Martin Hurt	(Hungary) Nyíregyháza Spartacus
(Estonia) Rene Kaas	(Estonia) HÜJK Emmaste
(Brazil) (Italy) Murilo Maccari	Unknown
(Estonia) Jevgeni Novikov	Unknown
(Estonia) Miroslav Rõškevitš	Unknown
(Estonia) Maksim Smirnov	Unknown
(Estonia) Janar Tükk	(Estonia) HÜJK Emmaste
(Belarus) Vitali Shuhanau	Unknown

=== Levadia ===
In	From
(Estonia) Anton Aristov	(Estonia) Tammeka
(Estonia) Artjom Artjunin	(Estonia) Tammeka
(Estonia) Maksim Paponov	(Estonia) Tallinna Kalev
(Estonia) Andero Pebre	(Estonia) Paide LM (loan return)
(Estonia) Aleksandr Volodin	(Estonia) Trans

Out	To
(Russia) Yaroslav Dmitriev	Unknown
(Estonia) Vitali Gussev	(Romania) Astra Ploieşti
(Estonia) Martin Kaalma	Retired
(Estonia) Kert Kütt	Unknown
(Estonia) Kristian Marmor	Retired
(Estonia) Sander Puri	(Greece) AEL
(Estonia) Tihhon Šišov	(Azerbaijan) Khazar
(Estonia) Tõnis Stakopf	(Estonia) Tamme Auto
(Estonia) Indrek Zelinski	Retired

=== Lootus ===
In	From
(Estonia) Roman Daniljuk	(Estonia) Sillamäe Kalev
(Estonia) Rameš Mamedov	(Estonia) Tallinna Kalev
(Estonia) Konstantin Rubtsov	(Estonia) Tamme Auto
(Estonia) Dmitri Smirnov	(Estonia) Sillamäe Kalev

Out	To

=== Paide LM ===
In	From
(Estonia) Oliver Andres	(Estonia) Warrior
(Estonia) Volodja Erdei	(Estonia) Operi JK
(Estonia) Herki Orro	Unknown
(Estonia) Madis Randoja	(Estonia) Warrior
(Estonia) Vahur Vahtramäe	(Estonia) Tallinna Kalev

Out	To
(Estonia) Lauri Ellram	(Cyprus) Orfeas Nicosia
(Estonia) Liivo Leetma	(Finland) Grankulla
(Estonia) Andero Pebre	(Estonia) Levadia (loan return)
(Estonia) Alan Ventsel	(Estonia) Tulevik
(Estonia) Karel Voolaid	Retired

=== Sillamäe Kalev ===
In	From

Out	To
(Lithuania) Gvidas Grigas	(Belgium) RFC Liège

=== Tulevik ===
In	From

Out	To
(Estonia) Jüri Jevdokimov	(Estonia) Kalju
(Estonia) Tanel Võtti	(Estonia) Kalju
