= Yevsyukov =

Yevsyukov (Russian: Евсюков; masculine) or Yevsyukova (Евсюко́ва; feminine) is a Russian last name. Variants of this last name include Yevsikov/Yevsikova (Е́всиков/Е́всикова), Yevsyunin/Yevsyunina (Евсю́нин/Евсю́нина), Yevsyutin/Yevsyutina (Евсю́тин/Евсю́тина), Yevsyutkin/Yevsyutkina (Евсю́ткин/Евсю́ткина), Yevsyukhin/Yevsyukhina (Евсю́хин/Евсю́хина), Yevsyushin/Yevsyushina (Евсю́шин/Евсю́шина), and Yevsyushkin/Yevsyushkina (Евсю́шкин/Евсю́шкина).

There are two theories regarding the origins of these last names. The first one relates them to last name Yevseyev, derived from the Christian male first name Yevsevy, or its colloquial form Yevsey. But it is also possible that some of them derive from the Christian male first names Yevstafy or Yevstigney.

The following people share this last name:

- Viktor Yevsyukov (born 1956), Kazakhstani javelin thrower
- Vladimir Yevsyukov (born 1953), Russian football player and coach
- Yevgeniy Yevsyukov (born 1950), Soviet race walker

== See also ==
- Yevsyukovo, several rural localities in Russia
