= Sergei Frolov =

Sergei Frolov may refer to:

- Sergei Frolov (footballer)
- Sergei Frolov (artist)
- Sergei Frolov (actor)
