= 2009 in Estonian football =

- Meistriliiga winners
- TBD
- Estonian Cup winners
- FC Flora Tallinn
- SuperCup winners
- FC Flora Tallinn
- Champions League
- FC Levadia Tallinn (1Q)
- Europa League
- FC Flora Tallinn (2Q); FC Trans Narva (1Q); JK Kalju Nõmme (1Q)
- Estonian national team
- 2010 World Cup qualification
- Estonian Footballer of the Year
- Raio Piiroja

The 2009 season is the 18th competitive football season in Estonia.

== National Leagues ==
=== Meistriliiga ===
Pos	Team	Pld	W	D	L	GF	GA	GD	Pts	Qualification or relegation
1	Levadia (C)	36	31	4	1	121	23	+98	97	Qualification for Champions League second qualifying round
2	Sillamäe Kalev	36	24	4	8	85	40	+45	76	Qualification for Europa League second qualifying round
3	Trans	36	23	7	6	82	29	+53	76	Qualification for Europa League first qualifying round (Note: The winner of the 2009–10 Estonian Cup, Levadia have already qualified for Champions League, that means Flora will qualify for the 2010–11 UEFA Europa League 1st qualifying round as cup runners-up.)
4	Flora	36	22	6	8	79	31	+48	72	Qualification for Europa League first qualifying round
5	Kalju	36	15	9	12	65	47	+18	54	
6	Tulevik	36	15	6	15	55	49	+6	51	
7	Tammeka	36	7	3	26	29	86	−57	24	
8	Kuressaare	36	7	3	26	21	99	−78	24	
9	Paide Linnameeskond (O)	36	6	4	26	21	97	−76	22	Qualification for relegation play-offs
10	Tallinna Kalev (R)	36	4	4	28	32	89	−57	16	Relegation to Esiliiga

Source: Estonian Football Association (in Estonian)
Rules for classification: 1st points; 2nd least withdrawals or annulled matches; 3rd overall wins; 4th head-to-head points; 5th head-to-head goal difference; 6th goal difference; 7th goals scored.
If two or more teams on the top have the same number of points by the end of the season, the aforementioned rules will not apply and additional game(s) will be played to determine the champions
(C) Champions; (O) Play-off winners; (R) Relegated

=== Esiliiga ===
Pos	Team	Pld	W	D	L	GF	GA	GD	Pts	Promotion or relegation
1	Levadia II (Note: Reserve teams are ineligible for promotion.) (C)	36	26	8	2	96	21	+75	86	
2	Lootus (P)	36	24	2	10	88	48	+40	74	Promotion to Meistriliiga
3	Warrior	36	21	2	13	68	63	+5	65	Qualification for promotion play-offs
4	Lasnamäe Ajax	36	20	4	12	75	53	+22	64	
5	Tamme Auto (Note: Three points deducted from Kiviõli Tamme Auto and six from FC Flora Rakvere before season because of licensing problems.)	36	17	2	17	77	77	0	50	
6	TJK Legion	36	13	5	18	63	76	−13	44	
7	Vaprus	36	11	6	19	64	77	−13	39	
8	Tulevik II	36	10	6	20	49	79	−30	36	Qualification for relegation play-offs
9	Flora U21 (R)	36	9	5	22	35	64	−29	32	Relegation to II Liiga
10	Rakvere (R)	36	8	2	26	48	105	−57	20	Relegation to II Liiga

Source: Jalgpall.ee Soccernet.ee
Rules for classification: 1) points; 2) goal difference; 3) number of goals scored.
(C) Champions; (P) Promoted; (R) Relegated

== Estonian FA Cup ==
Flora Tallinn, playing in their 6th final, successfully defended the title, winning the cup for the 4th time overall. The normal and the extra time ended 0–0. The match went to a penalty shootout, where Flora 4–3. Kalju Nõmme played in their first ever cup final, defeating three Meistriliiga sides on the way. The final was played on 12 May at Kadrioru Stadium.

=== Final ===
12 May 2009
18:45 EEST

Flora	0–0 (a.e.t.)	Nõmme Kalju
	Report
Penalties
Zahovaiko (penalty scored); Kasimir (penalty scored); Vunk (penalty missed); Vanna (penalty scored); Dupikov (penalty scored)	4–3	(penalty scored) Smirnov; (penalty scored) Rõškevitš; (penalty scored) Pimentel; (penalty missed) Hurt; (penalty missed) Nunes

Kadrioru staadion, Tallinn
Attendance: 2,000
Referee: Kristo Tohver

== National Teams ==
=== A Team ===
The Estonia national football team played a total number of thirteen matches, and did not qualify for the 2010 FIFA World Cup in South Africa.

Date	Comp.	Venue	Home team	Result	Away team	Scorers
February 11	Friendly	Top Kapi Stadium, Belek	Kazakhstan	2 – 0	Estonia	
March 28	WC10Q	Hanrapetakan Stadium, Jerevan	Armenia	2 – 2	Estonia	Vassiljev 36' Zenjov 67'
April 1	WC10Q	A. Le Coq Arena, Tallinn	Estonia	1 – 0	Armenia	S. Puri 83'
May 29	Friendly	Parc y Scarlets, Llanelli	Wales	1 – 0	Estonia	
June 6	Friendly	A. Le Coq Arena, Tallinn	Estonia	3 – 0	Equatorial Guinea	Viikmäe 8' Voskoboinikov 35' Zenjov 90'
June 10	Friendly	A. Le Coq Arena, Tallinn	Estonia	0 – 0	Portugal	
August 12	Friendly	A. Le Coq Arena, Tallinn	Estonia	0 – 1	Brazil	
September 5	WC10Q	Istanbul	Turkey	4 – 2	Estonia	Voskoboinikov 7' Vassiljev 52'
September 9	WC10Q	Estadio Romano, Mérida	Spain	3 – 0	Estonia	
October 10	WC10Q	A. Le Coq Arena, Tallinn	Estonia	0 – 2	Bosnia and Herzegovina	
October 14	WC10Q	A. Le Coq Arena, Tallinn	Estonia	2 – 0	Belgium	Piiroja 30' Vassiljev 67'
November 14	Friendly	A. Le Coq Arena, Tallinn	Estonia	0 – 0	Albania	
December 30	Friendly	Estadio Municipal, Vila Real de Santo António, Portugal	Angola	0 – 1	Estonia	Saag 79'
Notes	WC10Q – 2010 FIFA World Cup qualification – UEFA Group 5					

=== U-21 ===
Date	Comp.	Venue	Home team	Result	Away team	Scorers
February 11	Friendly	Esport Arena, Helsinki	Finland	2 – 1	Estonia	Jegorov 28'
March 27	Friendly	Stade Jacques Rimbault, Bourges	France	3 – 0	Estonia	
June 5	Friendly	Kadriorg Stadium, Tallinn	Estonia	1 – 1	Norway	Stüf 72'
June 9	Friendly	Falkenberg Stadium, Falkenberg	Sweden	2 – 1	Estonia	Sillaste 59'
August 12	Euro 2011 Q	Stadion Breite, Schaffhausen	Switzerland	0 – 1	Estonia	Saag 31'
September 5	Euro 2011 Q	A. Le Coq Arena, Tallinn	Estonia	2 – 0	Georgia	Mošnikov 42', Anier 90'
September 9	Euro 2011 Q	Linnastaadion, Rakvere	Estonia	1 – 1	Republic of Ireland	Saag 4'
October 9	Euro 2011 Q	Kadriorg Stadium, Tallinn	Estonia	1 – 4	Switzerland	Zenjov 7'
November 14	Euro 2011 Q	Hanrapetakan Stadium, Yerevan	Armenia	1 – 1	Estonia	Artjunin 90+3'
November 18	Euro 2011 Q	Rize Atatürk Stadium, Rize	Turkey	0 – 0	Estonia	
Notes	Euro 2011 Q – 2011 UEFA European Under-21 Football Championship qualification					

=== U-19 ===
Date	Comp.	Venue	Home team	Result	Away team	Scorers
January 15	Friendly	Esport Arena, Helsinki	Finland	2 – 0	Estonia	
February 4	Friendly	OSC Football Hall, Riga	Latvia	2 – 4	Estonia	Own goal 44' Taar 65' Prosa 70' Ljaš 82'
March 10	Friendly	Chalcis	Greece	3 – 0	Estonia	
March 12	Friendly	Chalcis	Greece	3 – 2	Estonia	Laabus 9' Anier 41'
March 30	Friendly	Stade de la Fontenette, Carouge	Switzerland	6 – 0	Estonia	
April 1	Friendly	Lancy	Switzerland	3 – 1	Estonia	Subbotin 9'
April 6	Friendly	Sportland Arena, Tallinn	Estonia	2 – 4	Belarus	Tamm 80' Jahhimovitš 90'
April 8	Friendly	Sportland Arena, Tallinn	Estonia	0 – 1	Belarus	
April 15	Friendly	Sportland Arena, Tallinn	Estonia	2 – 1	Liechtenstein	Tamm 7' Ilves 20'
May 1	Baltic Cup	Daugava Stadium, Riga	Latvia	3 – 2	Estonia	Krillo 10' Kõlu 64'
May 2	Baltic Cup	Daugava Stadium, Riga	Lithuania	1 – 1	Estonia	Stepanjan 19'
May 12	Friendly	Kalevi Keskstaadion, Tallinn	Estonia	0 – 4	Austria	
May 21	EC09EQ	A. Le Coq Arena, Tallinn	Estonia	0 – 5	Germany	
May 23	EC09EQ	A. Le Coq Arena, Tallinn	Estonia	0 – 3	Spain	
May 26	EC09EQ	A. Le Coq Arena, Tallinn	Estonia	1 – 5	Czech Republic	Tamm 1'
July 15	Friendly	Helsinki	Finland	6 – 0	Estonia	
August 4	Friendly	Linnastaadion, Rakvere	Estonia	0 – 0	Georgia	
August 6	Friendly	Linnastaadion, Rakvere	Estonia	1 – 0	Georgia	Own goal 63'
September 8	Friendly	Kuusalu staadion, Kuusalu	Estonia	0 – 1	Greece	
September 10	Friendly	Linnastaadion, Haapsalu	Estonia	0 – 3	Greece	
September 23	EC19Q	Sūduva Stadium, Marijampolė	Croatia	3 – 0	Estonia	
September 25	EC19Q	Sūduva Stadium, Marijampolė	Switzerland	5 – 0	Estonia	
September 28	EC19Q	Sūduva Stadium, Marijampolė	Lithuania	2 – 1	Estonia	Teino 83'
Unofficial match(es)
May 5	Friendly	A. Le Coq Arena, Tallinn	Estonia	0 – 6	(Estonia) Flora Tallinn	

=== U-18 ===
Date	Comp.	Venue	Home team	Result	Away team	Scorers
February 21	Friendly	OSC Football Hall, Riga	Latvia	6 – 0	Estonia	
April 28	Friendly	Rådavallen, Mellerud	Sweden	5 – 0	Estonia	
April 30	Friendly	Bergslätts IP, Ed	Sweden	2 – 0	Estonia	
June 10	Friendly	Complexe Sportif Jean Wirtz, Strassen	Luxembourg	3 – 4	Estonia	Karpov 17' Podholjuzin 44' 78' Own goal 48'

=== U-17 ===
Date	Comp.	Venue	Home team	Result	Away team	Scorers
January 20	Friendly	OSC Football Hall, Riga	Latvia	2 – 3	Estonia	Luigend 32', Raudsepp 40', Knjazev 70'
January 22	Friendly	OSC Football Hall, Riga	Latvia	1 – 2	Estonia	Elhi 1', Rääbis 58'
May 1	Baltic Cup	Daugava Stadium, Riga	Estonia	1 – 0	Latvia	Leht 10'
May 2	Baltic Cup	Daugava Stadium, Riga	Lithuania	0 – 1	Estonia	Knjazev 2'
July 26	Friendly	Mikheil Meskhi Stadium, Tbilisi	Georgia	3 – 1	Estonia	Pikkor 49'
July 28	Friendly	Mikheil Meskhi Stadium, Tbilisi	Georgia	3 – 1	Estonia	Elhi 30'
August 19	Friendly	Ta' Qali National Stadium training pitch, Ta' Qali	Malta	0 – 1	Estonia	Leht 80'
August 21	Friendly	Ta' Qali National Stadium training pitch, Ta' Qali	Malta	1 – 0	Estonia	
September 16	Friendly	Töölön Pallokenttä, Helsinki	Finland	3 – 0	Estonia	
October 17	EC10Q	Kadriorg Stadium, Tallinn	Estonia	0 – 0	Ukraine	
October 19	EC10Q	Kadriorg Stadium, Tallinn	Estonia	1 – 3	France	Leht 21'
October 22	EC10Q	Kadriorg Stadium, Tallinn	Estonia	1 – 0	Slovenia	Rättel 58'
Notes	EC10Q – 2010 UEFA European Under-17 Football Championship qualification					

=== U-16 ===
Date	Comp.	Venue	Home team	Result	Away team	Scorers
February 1	Friendly	OSC Football Hall, Riga	Latvia	5 – 0	Estonia	
April 28	Friendly	Juchnowiec Dolny	Poland	4 – 0	Estonia	
April 30	Friendly	Sokółka	Poland	5 – 0	Estonia	
September 8	Friendly	Stadion En Marche	Switzerland	6 – 0	Estonia	
September 10	Friendly	Centre sportif des 3 sapins	Switzerland	4 – 0	Estonia	
November 11	Friendly	Waren Müritz	Germany	6 – 2	Estonia	Kubber 68' Aotäht 76'
Unofficial match(es)
April 17	Tournament of Kazachenok	Saint Petersburg	Estonia	5 – 0	Aktyubinsk Iskra	Koger 7' 40' Kirss 13' 16' Piir 20'
April 17	Tournament of Kazachenok	Saint Petersburg	Estonia	0 – 0	Kolomyagi St. Petersburg	
April 18	Tournament of Kazachenok	Saint Petersburg	Estonia	0 – 5	Smena St. Petersburg	
April 19	Tournament of Kazachenok	Saint Petersburg	Estonia	3 – 2	Brazilian Football School	Koger 14' 34' Frolov 50'
June 7	Friendly	A. Le Coq Arena 1st grass pitch	Estonia	0 – 5	Helsinki '94	

=== U-15 ===
Date	Comp.	Venue	Home team	Result	Away team	Scorers
Unofficial match(es)
April 17	Friendly	Kalevi kunstmuruväljak, Tallinn	Estonia	6 – 1	(Estonia) Levadia '94	Kauber 2' (pen.) Laurits 6' Paur 16' 17' Ojamaa 29' Zakarljuka 50'
