= Yevseyenko =

Yevseyenko (Russian: Евсе́енко) is a Russian last name, a variant of Yevseyev. It is shared by the following people:

- Andrey Yevseyenko, bass guitarist of the Kazakhstani metal band Holy Dragons
- Nina Yevseyenko, founder of BTDigg, the first BitTorrent DHT search engine
- Pavel Yawseenka (Pavel Yevseyenko) (b. 1980), Belarusian association football player
- Sergey Yevseyenko, author of names published under the International Code of Zoological Nomenclature
- Tetyana Yevseyenko, Ukrainian shooter who participated in the 2009 World Running Target Championships
