= Ovsiyenko =

Ovsiyenko (Ukrainian: Овсієнко) is a Ukrainian surname. It is shared by the following people:

- Tatyana Ovsiyenko, Russian singer; see Russia in the Eurovision Song Contest
- Vasyl Ovsienko (Ovsiyenko), member of the Ukrainian Helsinki Group
- Volodymyr Ovsienko (Ovsiyenko) (b. 1978), Ukrainian association football player
- Yevgeny Ovsiyenko (b. 1988), Russian association football player

== See also ==
- Avseyenko
