= Yevsyukovo =

Yevsyukovo (Russian: Евсюково) is the name of several rural localities in Russia:

- Yevsyukovo, Vologda Oblast, a village in Komyansky Selsoviet of Gryazovetsky District in Vologda Oblast
- Yevsyukovo, Yaroslavl Oblast, a village in Slobodskoy Rural Okrug of Danilovsky District in Yaroslavl Oblast
