= Yevsevyevo =

Yevsevyevo (Russian: Евсевьево) is the name of several rural localities in Russia.

== Modern localities ==
- Yevsevyevo, Danilovsky District, Yaroslavl Oblast, a village in Semlovsky Rural Okrug of Danilovsky District in Yaroslavl Oblast
- Yevsevyevo, Poshekhonsky District, Yaroslavl Oblast, a village in Voshchikovsky Rural Okrug of Poshekhonsky District in Yaroslavl Oblast

== Alternative names ==
- Yevsevyevo, alternative name of Yevseyevo, a village in Ulitinskoye Rural Settlement of Pavlovo-Posadsky District in Moscow Oblast; 55°45′N 38°42′E

== See also ==
- Yevsevyev, Russian last name
