= Yevsevyev =

Yevsevyev (Russian: Евсе́вьев; masculine) or Yevsevyeva (Евсе́вьева; feminine) is a Russian last name, a variant of Yevseyev.

People with the last name

- Makar Yevsevyev, Russian linguist who studied the Moksha language

Toponyms

- Yevsevyeva, alternative name of Yevseyevo, a rural locality (a village) in Ulitinskoye Rural Settlement of Pavlovo-Posadsky District in Moscow Oblast, Russia; 55°45′N 38°42′E

== See also ==
- Yevsevyevo, several rural localities in Russia
