= Yevseichev =

Yevseichev (Russian: Евсе́ичев; masculine) or Yevseicheva (Евсе́ичева; feminine) is a Russian last name, a variant of Yevseyev. It derives from a patronymic which itself was derived from a patronymic ("Yevseichev" literally means a son of Yevseich, with "Yevseich" also being a patronymic), meaning that the first bearer of this last name was a grandson of someone named Yevsey.
