= Ovseyev =

Ovseyev (Russian: Овсе́ев; masculine) or Ovseyeva (Овсе́ева; feminine) is a Russian last name, a variant of Yevseyev. The following people bear this last name:

- Robbie Ovseev (Ovseyev), rugby player who participated in the 2011 Canterbury-Bankstown Bulldogs season

== See also ==
- Ovseyevo, a rural locality (a village) in Ostrovsky District of Pskov Oblast, Russia
