= Aseyev =

Aseyev (Russian: Асе́ев; masculine) or Aseyeva (Асе́ева; feminine) is a Russian last name, a variant of Yevseyev. It is shared by the following people:

- Anastasia Aseyeva, member of the ballet troupe at the Donetsk State Academic Opera and Ballet Theatre named after A. Solovyanenko
- Herman Aseyev, member of the parliament of Ukraine in 1990–1994
- Igor Aseyev, Hero of the Soviet Union who fought with Roza Shanina, a Soviet sniper
- Konstantin Aseev (Aseyev) (1960–2004), Russian chess grandmaster
- Lyudmila Aseyeva, one of the names of Lyudmila Gromova (b. 1942), Soviet Olympic artistic gymnast
- Nadezhna Aseyeva, Russian speed skater who participated in the 2014 World Sprint Speed Skating Championships
- Nikolai Aseev (Nikolay Aseyev) (1889–1963), Russian poet
- Stanislav Aseyev (b. 1989), Ukrainian writer and journalist.
- Tetyana Aseeva (Aseyeva), referee at the UEFA Women's Euro 2009 qualifying
- Vladimir Aseev (Aseyev) (b. 1951), Russian politician
