= Nacim Abdelali =

French footballer (born 1981)

Personal information
- Full name: Nacim Mustapha Abdelali
- Date of birth: 19 December 1981 (age 44)
- Place of birth: Aix-en-Provence, France
- Height: 1.70 m (5 ft 7 in)
- Position: Midfielder

Team information
- Current team: Yverdon-Sport FC
- Number: 10

Senior career*
Years	Team	Apps	(Gls)
2001–2004	Chamois Niortais	9	(0)
2005–2008	Gap	70	(4)
2008–2009	USM Blida	16	(2)
2010–2012	Nyíregyháza Spartacus	39	(1)
2012	Yverdon-Sport	0	(0)
- * Club domestic league appearances and goals as of 00:00, 1 August 2012 (UTC)

Nacim Mustapha Abdelali, sometimes spelt Nassim Mustapha Abdelaali, (born 19 December 1981) is a French footballer. He currently plays for Yverdon-Sport FC in the 1. Liga Promotion.

On 28 February 2010, Abdelali made his league début for Nyíregyháza Spartacus in a 3–2 win over Vasas SC.
