= Milan Davidov =

Serbian footballer

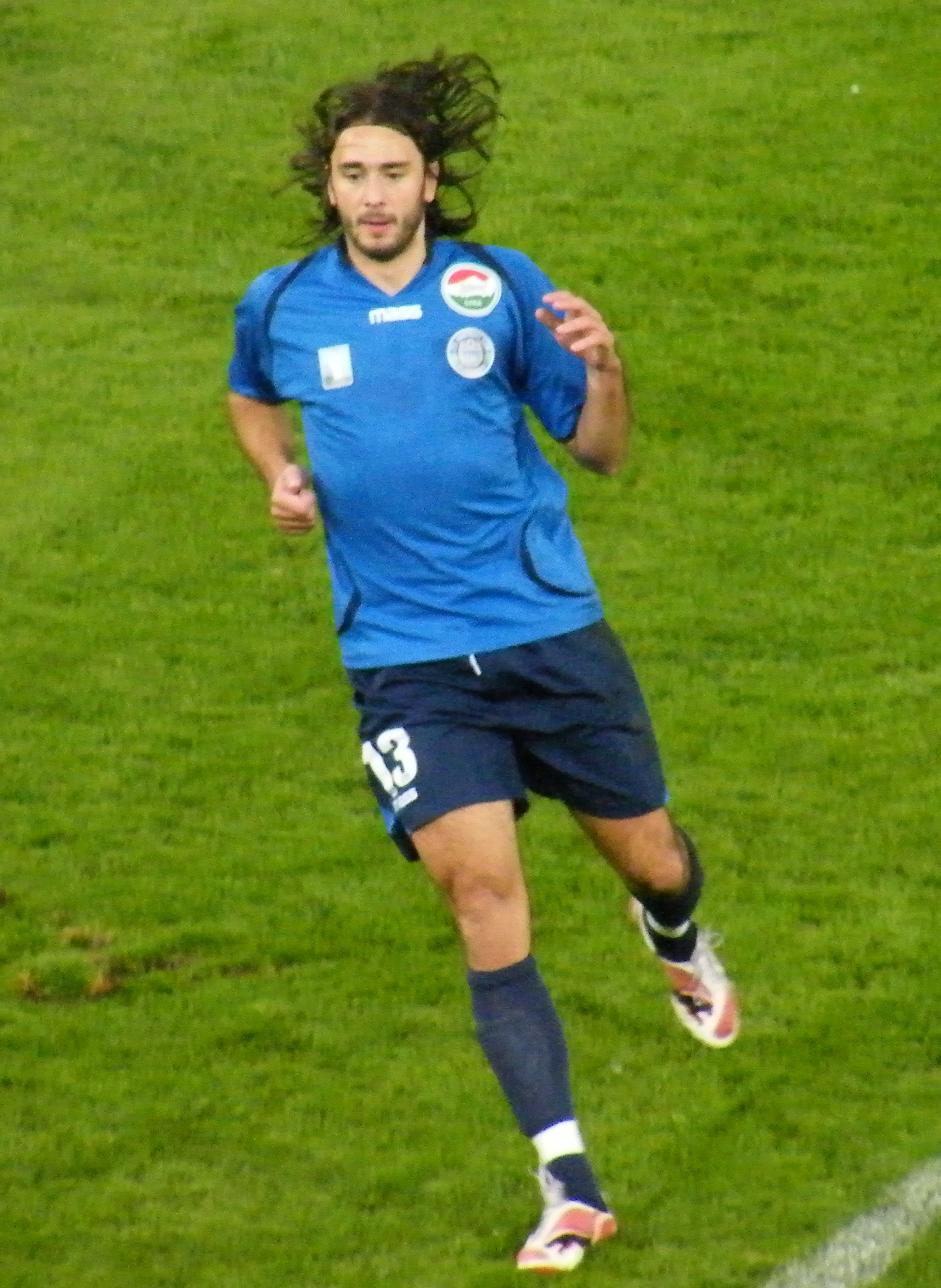
- Davidov with Zalaegerszeg

Personal information
- Full name: Milan Davidov
- Date of birth: 1 June 1979 (age 47)
- Place of birth: Odžaci, SFR Yugoslavia
- Height: 1.85 m (6 ft 1 in)
- Position: Midfielder

Youth career
- Omladinac Deronje

Senior career*
Years	Team	Apps	(Gls)
1998–2000	Tekstilac Odžaci	13	(1)
2000–2001	Cement Beočin	19	(0)
2001–2002	Mladost Apatin	18	(0)
2002–2005	Hajduk Kula	76	(7)
2005–2006	Borac Čačak	28	(4)
2006–2007	Vojvodina	19	(1)
2007–2008	Zalaegerszeg	39	(0)
2008	Zalaegerszeg II	1	(0)
2009	Hajduk Kula	16	(1)
2009	Borac Čačak	14	(0)
2010–2013	Nyíregyháza	42	(0)
2010–2011	→ Inđija (loan)	26	(2)
- * Club domestic league appearances and goals

Milan Davidov (Serbian Cyrillic: Милан Давидов; born 1 June 1979) is a Serbian former professional footballer.

He also graduated on the University of Novi Sad Faculty of Law in 2011.

== Career statistics ==
Club	Season	League	
Club	Season	Apps	Goals
Mladost Apatin	2001–02	18	0
Hajduk Kula	2002–03	22	1
Hajduk Kula	2003–04	24	2
Hajduk Kula	2004–05	30	4
Borac Čačak	2005–06	28	4
Vojvodina	2006–07	19	1
