= Yevsikov =

Yevsikov (Russian: Е́всиков; masculine) or Yevsikova (Е́всикова; feminine) is a Russian last name, a variant of Yevsyukov.

The following people share this last name:

- Anton Evsikov (Yevsikov), Russian swimmer participating in the open water swimming at the 2014 European Aquatics Championships – Men's 5 km
- Denis Yevsikov (b. 1981), Russian association football player
- Sergey Yevsikov, housemate on the Russian reality TV show Big Brother
- Tatyana Yevsikova, mayor of Anapa, a town in Krasnodar Krai, Russia

== See also ==
- Yevsikovo, a rural locality (a village) in Pizhansky District of Kirov Oblast, Russia; 57°17′N 48°25′E
