= Avseyenko =

Lubicz C.O.A

Avseyenko, Avseenko (Russian: Авсе́енко) is a Ukrainian surname of Russian noble Avseyenko family of Ukrainian descent, of Lubicz coat of arms.

Notable people with the surname include:

- Antonov-Ovseenko
- Natalie Avseenko (Natalya Avseyenko), former free diving champion featured in a photographic series illustrating the Orda Cave, a gypsum crystal cave underneath the western Ural Mountains
- Oxana Avseyenko, Kazakhstani cross country skier who participated in the 1994 IAAF World Cross Country Championships – Junior women's race
- Vasily Avseenko (Vasily Avseyenko) (1842–1913), Russian literary critic, writer, and journalist

== See also ==
- Ovsiyenko
