= Yevsyukovo, Vologda Oblast =

Yevsyukovo Евсюково
- Village
- Location within Vologda Oblast Location within Russia
- Coordinates: 58°59′N 40°25′E
- Country: Russia
- Region: Vologda Oblast
- District: Gryazovetsky District
- Time zone: UTC+3:00

Yevsyukovo (Russian: Евсюково) is a rural locality (a village) in Komyanskoye Rural Settlement, Gryazovetsky District, Vologda Oblast, Russia. The population was 17 as of 2002.

== Geography ==
Yevsyukovo is located 29 km northeast of Gryazovets (the district's administrative centre) by road. Krutets is the nearest rural locality.
