= Petar Stanišić =

Montenegrin footballer

Personal information
- Full name: Petar Stanišić
- Date of birth: 23 September 1984 (age 42)
- Place of birth: Bačka Topola, Yugoslavia
- Height: 1.80 m (5 ft 11 in)
- Position: Defender

Senior career*
Years	Team	Apps	(Gls)
2001–2002	AIK Bačka Topola		
2002–2004	Njegoš Lovćenac		
2004–2005	Crvenka	21	(2)
2005–2006	Spartak Subotica	11	(0)
2006–2007	Zlatibor Voda	19	(3)
2007	Petrovac	15	(4)
2008–2009	Kairat	25+	(1+)
2010–2011	Nyíregyháza Spartacus	5	(0)
2010	→ Szolnok (loan)	8	(1)
2011	→ Petrovac (loan)	13	(0)
2011–2012	Bačka Topola		
2012–2013	Mornar	14	(0)
- * Club domestic league appearances and goals

Petar Stanišić (Cyrillic: Петар Станишић; born 23 September 1984) is a Montenegrin retired football midfielder who last played for FK Mornar in the Montenegrin First League.
