= Yevseyevo =

Yevseyevo (Russian: Евсеево) is the name of several rural localities in Russia:

- Yevseyevo, Moscow, a village in Desenovskoye Settlement of the federal city of Moscow
- Yevseyevo, Moscow Oblast, a village in Ulitinskoye Rural Settlement of Pavlovo-Posadsky District in Moscow Oblast; 55°45′N 38°42′E
- Yevseyevo, Pskov Oblast, a village in Pskovsky District of Pskov Oblast
- Yevseyevo, Yaroslavl Oblast, a village in Veskovsky Rural Okrug of Pereslavsky District in Yaroslavl Oblast
