= Peter Struhár =

Slovak footballer

Personal information
- Full name: Peter Struhár
- Date of birth: 17 January 1984 (age 42)
- Place of birth: Bratislava, Czechoslovakia
- Height: 1.91 m (6 ft 3 in)
- Position: Centre-back

Youth career
- ZŤS Martin
- Sigma Pumpy Hranice na Morave
- ŠK Turčianska Štiavnička

Senior career*
Years	Team	Apps	(Gls)
2005–2008	Slovan Bratislava	39	(2)
2008–2009	Petržalka	15	(2)
2009–2010	Slovácko	11	(0)
2010	Nyíregyháza Spartacus	15	(2)
2010–2011	Dunajská Streda	35	(2)
2011–2012	Kapfenberger SV	2	(0)
2012–2013	Nitra	28	(1)
2013–2014	Pápa	23	(0)
2014	Dunajská Streda	9	(0)
2015	TJ Slovan Čeľadice		
2015–2021	Tatran Oravské Veselé		

Managerial career
- 2019–2020: Ružomberok II (assistant)
- 2021–2023: Ružomberok
- 2023–2024: Michalovce
- 2024–2025: GKS Jastrzębie
- 2025–2026: Znicz Pruszków
- * Club domestic league appearances and goals

Peter Struhár (born 17 January 1984) is a Slovak professional football manager and former player. He was most recently in charge of Polish club Znicz Pruszków. Prior to that, he managed MFK Ružomberok, Zemplín Michalovce and GKS Jastrzębie.

Struhár played for Czech team 1. FC Slovácko.

== Managerial statistics ==
As of match played 20 March 2026

Managerial record by team and tenure
Team	From	To	Record							
Team	From	To	G	W	D	L	GF	GA	GD	Win %
Ružomberok	1 July 2021	30 June 2023	78	37	25	16	126	65	+61	47.44
Michalovce	28 September 2023	20 February 2024	14	2	5	7	15	18	−3	14.29
GKS Jastrzębie	3 December 2024	30 June 2025	16	8	2	6	16	12	+4	50.00
Znicz Pruszków	14 August 2025	26 March 2026	24	6	5	13	25	42	−17	25.00
Total			132	53	37	42	182	137	+45	40.15

== Honours ==
=== Player ===
Slovan Bratislava

- Slovak First Football League: 2008–09

=== Managerial ===
Ružomberok

- Slovak Super Liga runner-up: 2021–22
