= Jean-Baptiste Paternotte =

French footballer (born 1981)

Personal information
- Full name: Jean-Baptiste Paternotte
- Date of birth: January 4, 1981 (age 45)
- Place of birth: Noyon, France
- Height: 1.90 m (6 ft 3 in)
- Position: Defender

Team information
- Current team: UR Namur

Senior career*
Years	Team	Apps	(Gls)
2000–2001	CS Sedan B	?	(?)
2001–2005	US Roye	?	(?)
2005–2007	AFC Compiègne	?	(?)
2007–2010	AFC Tubize	43	(2)
2009	→ Olympic Charleroi (loan)	10	(0)
2010	Szombathelyi Haladás	1	(0)
2011–	UR Namur	0	(0)
- * Club domestic league appearances and goals as of 8 May 2010

Jean-Baptiste Paternotte (born 4 January 1981) is a French football player who plays in Belgium for Union Royale Namur. He has also played for A.F.C. Tubize and CS Sedan in the Championnat National.
