= Zsolt Müller =

Hungarian footballer

Personal information
- Full name: Zsolt Müller
- Date of birth: 8 April 1984 (age 42)
- Place of birth: Nyíregyháza, Hungary
- Height: 1.75 m (5 ft 9 in)
- Position: Midfielder

Team information
- Current team: Balmazújváros
- Number: 23

Youth career
- 1994–1998: Nyíregyháza
- 1998–2000: Debrecen

Senior career*
Years	Team	Apps	(Gls)
2000–2003	Debrecen	7	(0)
2003–2004	→ Nyíregyháza (loan)		
2004–2005	Diósgyőr	19	(2)
2005–2006	→ Pápa (loan)	20	(0)
2006–2008	Győr	37	(1)
2008–2009	Integrál-DAC	41	(2)
2009–2010	Nyíregyháza	12	(0)
2010–2011	Bőcs	12	(0)
2011	Kazincbarcika	14	(1)
2011–2012	Wallern		
2012–2013	St.Peter\Au	4	(0)
2013–	Balmazújváros	26	(1)

International career
1998–1999	Hungary U-14	3	(2)
1999–2000	Hungary U-15	12	(2)
- * Club domestic league appearances and goals as of 1 June 2014

Zsolt Müller (born 8 April 1984 in Nyíregyháza) is a Hungarian football player who currently plays for Nyíregyháza Spartacus.
