= Yevsyunin =

Yevsyunin (Russian: Евсю́нин; masculine) or Yevsyunina (Евсю́нина; feminine) is a Russian last name, a variant of Yevsyukov.

The following people share this last name:

- Anastasia Evsyunina (Anastasiya Yevsyunina), Russian biathlete participating in the Biathlon European Championships 2014
- Sergey Yevsyunin, Soviet actor playing an evil wizard in the 1970 children's movie The Secret of the Iron Door

== See also ==
- Yevsyunino, a rural locality (a village) in Kirillovsky District of Vologda Oblast, Russia
