= Željko Kovačević =

Serbian footballer

Personal information
- Full name: Željko Kovačević
- Date of birth: 30 October 1981 (age 45)
- Place of birth: Čačak, SFR Yugoslavia
- Height: 1.97 m (6 ft 5 1/2 in)
- Position: Centre-back

Youth career
- Borac Čačak

Senior career*
Years	Team	Apps	(Gls)
1999–2003	Borac Čačak	52	(5)
2003–2007	Smederevo	80	(4)
2007–2008	Rabotnički	16	(0)
2008	Vardar	5	(0)
2009	Smederevo	24	(0)
2010–2011	Nyíregyháza Spartacus	31	(4)
2012	Slavija Sarajevo	7	(0)
2012–2014	Polet Ljubić		
Total		215	(13)

Managerial career
- 2021–2022: Borac Čačak
- * Club domestic league appearances and goals as of 6 August 2016

Željko Kovačević (Serbian Cyrillic: Жељко Ковачевић; born 30 October 1981) is a Serbian retired footballer who played as a defender.

== Statistics ==
Club	Season	League	
Club	Season	Apps	Goals
Borac Čačak	1999–00	6	0
Borac Čačak	Total	6	0
Smederevo	2003–04	26	3
Smederevo	2004–05	23	1
Smederevo	2005–06	11	0
Smederevo	2006–07	20	0
Smederevo	Total	80	4
Career total		86	4

== Honours ==
Rabotnički

- Macedonian First League: 2007–08
- Macedonian Cup: 2007–08
