= Balázs Nánási =

Hungarian footballer

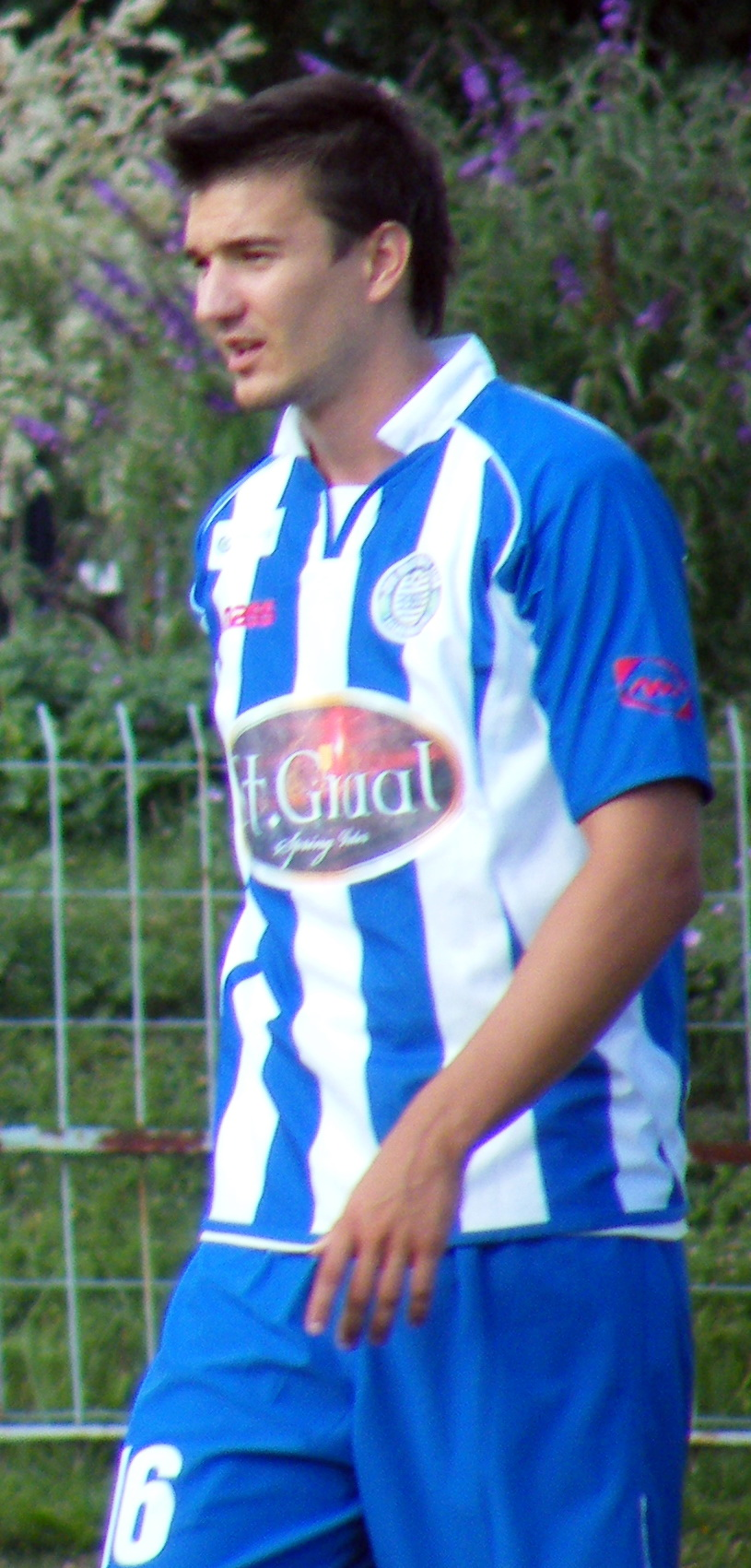
- Nánási Balázs in 2011

Personal information
- Full name: Balázs Nánási
- Date of birth: 22 April 1989 (age 37)
- Place of birth: Nyíregyháza, Hungary
- Height: 1.84 m (6 ft 0 in)
- Position: Centre-back

Youth career
- 2002–2003: Demecser
- 2003–2007: Nyíregyháza

Senior career*
Years	Team	Apps	(Gls)
2007–2011	Nyíregyháza	16	(1)
2011–2014	Zalaegerszeg	33	(4)
2011–2012	→ Nyíregyháza (loan)	14	(0)
2014	Vasas	0	(0)
2014–2016	Mezőkövesd	10	(0)
2016	→ Felsőtárkány (loan)	14	(1)
2016–2019	Cegléd	70	(6)
2019–2020	Kecskemét	15	(3)
- * Club domestic league appearances and goals as of 19:05, 5 May 2024 (UTC)

Balázs Nánási (born 22 April 1989 in Nyíregyháza) is a Hungarian football player.
