= Péter Orosz =

Hungarian footballer

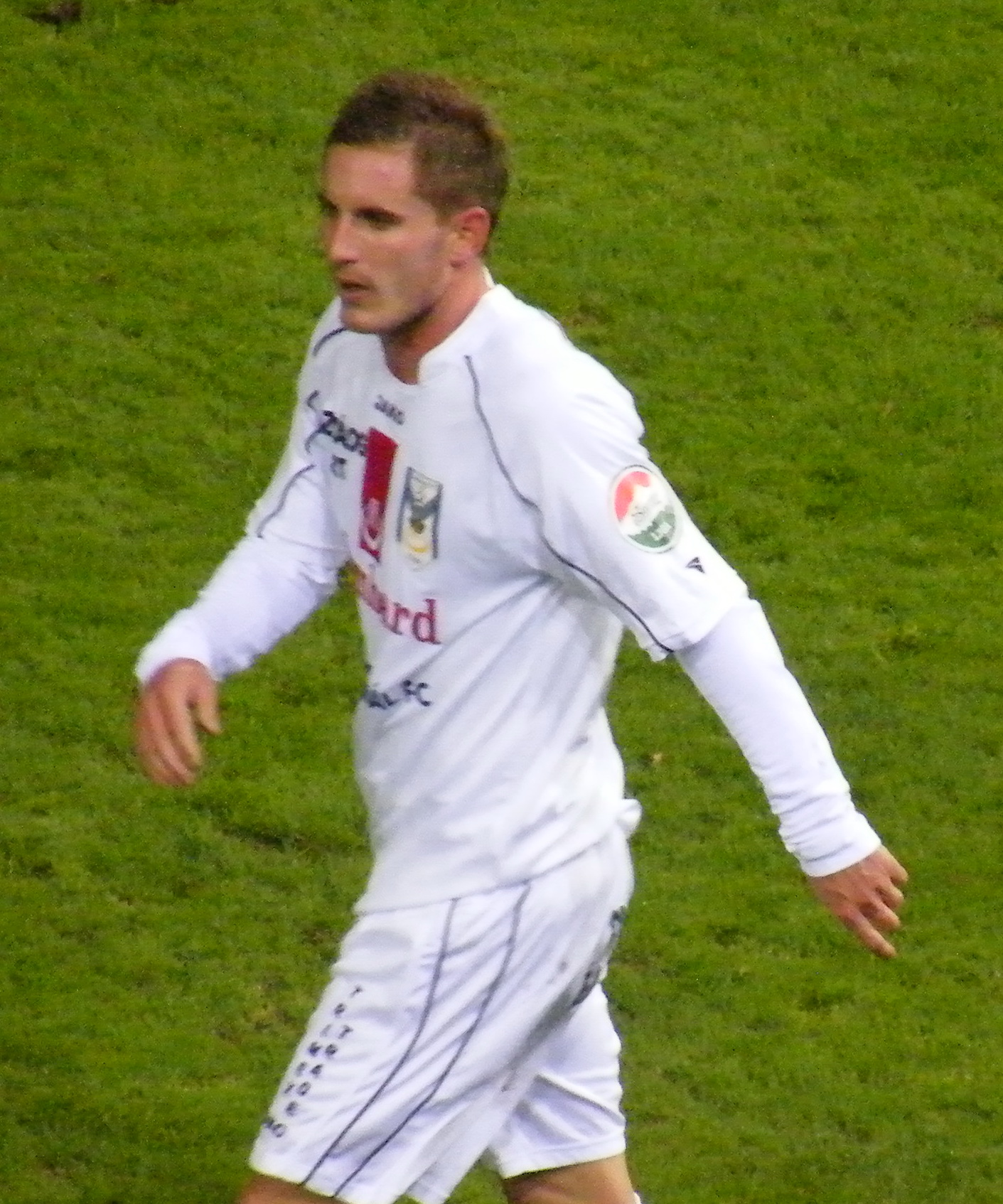

Personal information
- Date of birth: 19 August 1981 (age 45)
- Place of birth: Budapest, Hungary
- Height: 1.81 m (5 ft 11 in)
- Position: Striker

Youth career
- 1995–1999: Vasas SC

Senior career*
Years	Team	Apps	(Gls)
1999–2000	III. Kerületi	3	(1)
2000–2001	Gázművek MTE	14	(12)
2001–2003	SK Saalfelden	40	(48)
2003–2005	FC Puch	?	(41)
2005–2007	Red Bull Salzburg	6	(1)
2007–2008	Wacker Innsbruck	33	(9)
2008	OFI	0	(0)
2009	Vasas	11	(0)
2009–2010	Lombard-Pápa	17	(3)
2010–2011	Pasching	28	(11)
2012	Vorwärts Steyr	13	(5)
2013	Union Vöcklamarkt	12	(6)
2013–2014	Vorwärts Steyr	15	(4)
2014–2016	ASKÖ Oedt		
2016–2017	Wels		
2017–2018	ASKÖ Vorchdorf		
2018–2021	ASKÖ Oedt II		
2021–2022	ASKÖ Vorchdorf		

International career
2008	Hungary	3	(0)
- * Club domestic league appearances and goals

Péter Orosz (born 19 August 1981) is a former football striker from Hungary.

== Career ==
He has previously played for Wacker Innsbruck in Austria and in Greece for OFI.
