= Sergei Frolov (footballer) =

Russian footballer

Personal information
- Full name: Sergei Sergeyevich Frolov
- Date of birth: 20 January 1989 (age 37)
- Height: 1.84 m (6 ft 1/2 in)
- Position: Forward

Youth career
- FC Lokomotiv Moscow

Senior career*
Years	Team	Apps	(Gls)
2006–2008	FC Lokomotiv Moscow	0	(0)
2008–2009	FC Nosta Novotroitsk	31	(7)
2010	FC Torpedo-ZIL Moscow	5	(0)
2011	FC Zenit Penza	6	(0)
2012	FC Olimp Fryazino		
2013	FC Lyubertsy		
- * Club domestic league appearances and goals

Sergei Sergeyevich Frolov (Russian: Серге́й Серге́евич Фролов; born 20 January 1989) is a former Russian professional football player.

== Club career ==
He played two seasons in the Russian Football National League for FC Nosta Novotroitsk.
