= Tibor Minczér =

Hungarian footballer

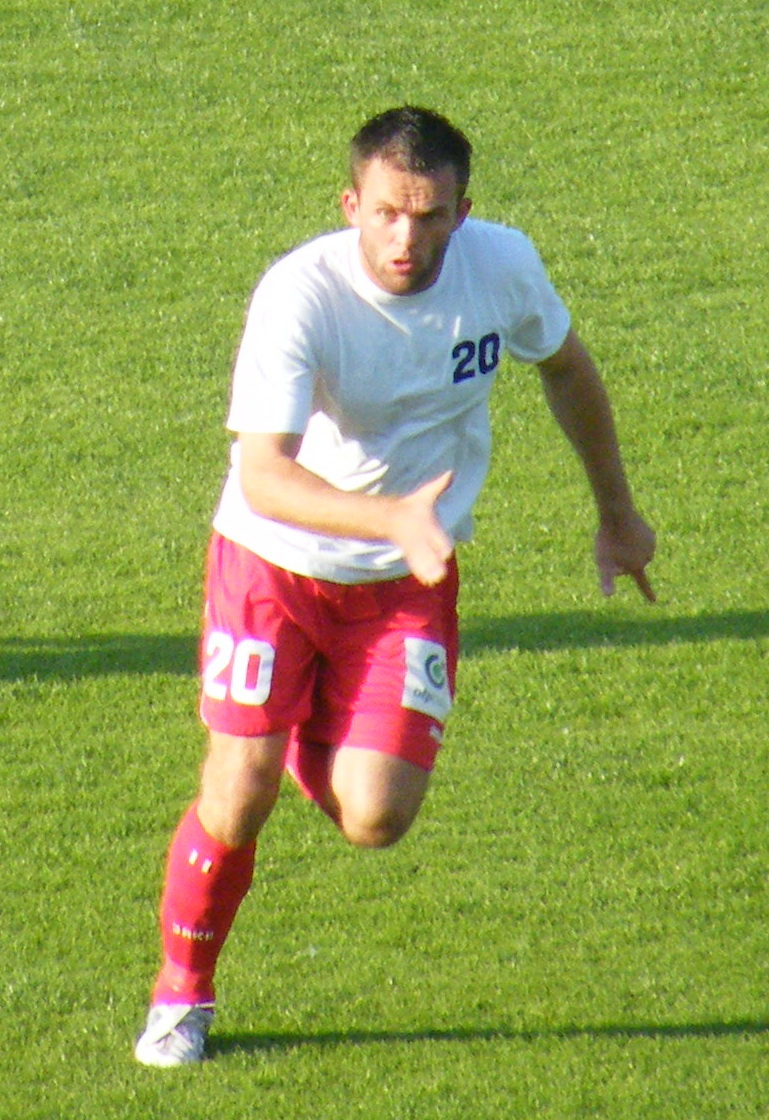

Personal information
- Full name: Tibor Minczér
- Date of birth: 23 June 1984 (age 42)
- Place of birth: Nyíregyháza, Hungary
- Height: 1.83 m (6 ft 0 in)
- Position: Midfielder

Team information
- Current team: Várda

Youth career
- 1992–2003: Nyírbátor
- 2003–2005: Rakamaz

Senior career*
Years	Team	Apps	(Gls)
2005–2014	Nyíregyháza	147	(3)
2011–2012	→ Hajdúböszörmény (loan)	11	(0)
2014–	Várda	12	(0)
- * Club domestic league appearances and goals as of 16 January 2015

Tibor Minczér (born 23 June 1984 in Nyíregyháza) is a Hungarian football player who currently plays for Várda SE.
