= Volodymyr Ovsiyenko =

Ukrainian footballer

Volodymyr Ovsienko
Personal information
- Full name: Volodymyr Volodymyrovych Ovsienko
- Date of birth: 30 October 1978 (age 48)
- Place of birth: Uzhhorod, Ukrainian SSR, Soviet Union
- Height: 1.88 m (6 ft 2 in)
- Position: Goalkeeper

Senior career*
| Years | Team | Apps | (Gls) |
| 1994–1996 | Zakarpattia Uzhhorod | 39 | (0) |
| 1997–1999 | CSKA-2 Kyiv | 26 | (0) |
| 1998 | CSKA Kyiv | 0 | (0) |
| 2000 | Polissya Zhytomyr | 0 | (0) |
| 2001–2005 | Zakarpattia Uzhhorod | 59 | (0) |
| 2001–2002 | → Zakarpattia-2 Uzhhorod | 17 | (0) |
| 2005 | Metalist Kharkiv | 3 | (0) |
| 2006–2007 | PFC Oleksandria | 52 | (0) |
| 2008–2009 | Obolon Kyiv | 21 | (0) |
| 2009–2010 | Naftovyk-Ukrnafta Okhtyrka | 15 | (0) |
| 2010 | Nyíregyháza Spartacus | 13 | (0) |
| 2011–2012 | PFC Oleksandria | 4 | (0) |
| 2012–2016 | Nyíregyháza Spartacus | 14 | (0) |
- * Club domestic league appearances and goals

Volodymyr Ovsienko (Ukrainian: Володимир Володимирович Овсієнко; born 30 October 1978) is a Ukrainian former football player.
