= 2009–10 Ligakupa =

Tournament details
- Country: Hungary

The 2009–10 Ligakupa was the third edition of the Hungarian League Cup, the Ligakupa.

== First group stage ==
=== Group A ===
Pos	Team	Pld	W	D	L	GF	GA	GD	Pts	Qualification	FER	NYI	VAS	MTK	KEC	DIO
1	Ferencváros	10	7	0	3	21	15	+6	21	Advance to second group stage	—	4–0	2–1	1–3	4–2	2–0
2	Nyíregyháza	10	5	2	3	28	13	+15	17	Advance to second group stage	3–4	—	2–3	7–0	2–0	3–0
3	Vasas	10	5	0	5	21	23	−2	15		3–0	1–3	—	2–1	5–0	3–1
4	MTK	10	3	4	3	15	16	−1	13		0–1	0–0	3–0	—	1–1	1–1
5	Kecskemét	10	3	3	4	16	21	−5	12		0–3	1–1	4–3	2–2	—	3–0
6	Diósgyőr	10	2	1	7	13	26	−13	7		3–0	0–7	7–0	1–4	0–3	—

Source: Hungarian Football Federation

==== Matches ====
1. day:
Kecskemét	0 – 3	Ferencváros
MTK	0 – 0	Nyíregyháza
Diósgyőr	7 – 0	Vasas
2. day:
Vasas	2 – 1	MTK
Nyíregyháza	2 – 0	Kecskemét
Ferencváros	2 – 0	Diósgyőr
3. day:
Kecskemét	4 – 3	Vasas
MTK	1 – 1	Diósgyőr
Ferencváros	4 – 0	Nyíregyháza
4. day:
MTK	0 – 1	Ferencváros
Diósgyőr	0 – 3	Kecskemét
Vasas	1 – 3	Nyíregyháza
5. day:
MTK	1 – 1	Kecskemét
Nyíregyháza	3 – 0	Diósgyőr
Ferencváros	2 – 1	Vasas
6. day:
Ferencváros	4 – 2	Kecskemét
Nyíregyháza	7 – 0	MTK
Vasas	3 – 1	Diósgyőr
7. day:
MTK	3 – 0	Vasas
Kecskemét	1 – 1	Nyíregyháza
Diósgyőr	3 – 0	Ferencváros
8. day:
Vasas	5 – 0	Kecskemét
Diósgyőr	1 – 4	MTK
Nyíregyháza	3 – 4	Ferencváros
9. day:
Ferencváros	1 – 3	MTK
Kecskemét	3 – 0	Diósgyőr
Nyíregyháza	2 – 3	Vasas
10. day:
MTK	2 – 2	Kecskemét
Vasas	3 – 0	Ferencváros
Diósgyőr	0 – 7	Nyíregyháza

=== Group B ===
Pos	Team	Pld	W	D	L	GF	GA	GD	Pts	Qualification	VID	PAK	ZAL	GYO	KAP	PAP
1	Videoton	10	5	4	1	19	7	+12	19	Advance to second group stage	—	3–0	1–1	1–1	4–1	5–0
2	Paks	10	5	2	3	16	11	+5	17	Advance to second group stage	0–1	—	3–0	3–3	4–0	1–1
3	Zalaegerszeg	10	5	1	4	17	17	0	16		2–0	3–1	—	1–0	3–1	4–2
4	Győr	10	4	4	2	18	11	+7	16		0–0	0–1	3–1	—	4–3	4–1
5	Kaposvár	10	3	1	6	9	19	−10	10		0–2	0–1	1–0	0–0	—	2–1
6	Pápa	10	1	2	7	12	26	−14	5		2–2	0–2	5–2	0–3	0–1	—

Source: Hungarian Football Federation

==== Matches ====
1. day:
Paks	1 – 1	Pápa
Győr	4 – 3	Kaposvár
Zalaegerszeg	2 – 0	Videoton
2. day:
Videoton	1 – 1	Győr
Kaposvár	0 – 1	Paks
Pápa	5 – 2	Zalaegerszeg
3. day:
Paks	0 – 1	Videoton
Győr	3 – 1	Zalaegerszeg
Pápa	0 – 1	Kaposvár
4. day:
Győr	4 – 1	Pápa
Zalaegerszeg	3 – 1	Paks
Videoton	4 – 1	Kaposvár
5. day:
Paks	3 – 3	Győr
Kaposvár	1 – 0	Zalaegerszeg
Pápa	2 – 2	Videoton
6. day:
Pápa	0 – 2	Paks
Kaposvár	0 – 0	Győr
Videoton	1 – 1	Zalaegerszeg
7. day:
Győr	0 – 0	Videoton
Paks	4 – 0	Kaposvár
Zalaegerszeg	4 – 2	Pápa
8. day:
Videoton	3 – 0	Paks
Zalaegerszeg	1 – 0	Győr
Kaposvár	2 – 1	Pápa
9. day:
Paks	3 – 0	Zalaegerszeg
Pápa	0 – 3	Győr
Kaposvár	0 – 2	Videoton
10. day:
Győr	0 – 1	Paks
Zalaegerszeg	3 – 1	Kaposvár
Videoton	5 – 0	Pápa

== Second group stage ==
=== Group A ===
Pos	Team	Pld	W	D	L	GF	GA	GD	Pts	Qualification	DEB	VID	HON	NYI
1	Debrecen	6	5	1	0	17	4	+13	16	Advance to final	—	2–2	2–1	5–1
2	Videoton	6	3	2	1	7	5	+2	11		0–2	—	2–0	1–0
3	Honvéd	6	1	2	3	8	8	0	5		0–2	1–1	—	1–1
4	Nyíregyháza	6	0	1	5	2	17	−15	1		0–4	0–1	0–5	—

Source: Hungarian Football Federation

==== Matches ====
1. day:
Honvéd	1 – 1	Nyíregyháza
Debrecen	2 – 2	Videoton
2. day:
Debrecen	5 – 1	Nyíregyháza
Videoton	2 – 0	Honvéd
3. day:
Videoton	1 – 0	Nyíregyháza
Debrecen	2 – 1	Honvéd
4. day:
Videoton	0 – 2	Debrecen
Nyíregyháza	0 – 5	Honvéd
5. day:
Nyíregyháza	0 – 4	Debrecen
Honvéd	1 – 1	Videoton
6. day:
Honvéd	0 – 2	Debrecen
Nyíregyháza	0 – 1	Videoton

=== Group B ===
Pos	Team	Pld	W	D	L	GF	GA	GD	Pts	Qualification	PAK	HAL	UTE	FER
1	Paks	6	3	3	0	9	6	+3	12	Advance to final	—	3–2	2–1	1–1
2	Haladás	6	1	3	2	9	9	0	6		0–0	—	2–2	4–1
3	Újpest	6	1	3	2	6	6	0	6		1–1	2–0	—	0–1
4	Ferencváros	6	1	3	2	5	8	−3	6		1–2	1–1	0–0	—

Source: Hungarian Football Federation

==== Matches ====
1. day:
Újpest	1 – 1	Paks
Haladás	4 – 1	Ferencváros
2. day:
Paks	3 – 2	Haladás
Ferencváros	0 – 0	Újpest
3. day:
Paks	1 – 1	Ferencváros
Újpest	2 – 0	Haladás
4. day:
Ferencváros	1 – 1	Haladás
Paks	2 – 1	Újpest
5. day:
Haladás	0 – 0	Paks
Újpest	0 – 1	Ferencváros
6. day:
Haladás	2 – 2	Újpest
Ferencváros	1 – 2	Paks

== Final ==
28 April 2010
18:00 (UTC+2)

Debrecen	2–1	Paks
Bódi 23'; Szilágyi 76'		Völgyi 40'

Széktói Stadion, Kecskemét
Attendance: 1,000
Referee: József Berger
