= Draško Vojinović =

Serbian footballer (born 1984)

Personal information
- Full name: Дpaшкo Bojинoвић
- Date of birth: 3 December 1984 (age 41)
- Place of birth: Subotica, SFR Yugoslavia
- Height: 1.90 m (6 ft 3 in)
- Position: Goalkeeper

Senior career*
Years	Team	Apps	(Gls)
2002–2006	Spartak Subotica		
2006–2008	Integrál-DAC	3	(0)
2008–2009	Diósgyőr	3	(0)
2009–2012	Nyíregyháza	43	(0)
- * Club domestic league appearances and goals as of 19 May 2010

Draško Vojinović (Serbian Cyrillic: Дpaшкo Bojинoвић; born 3 December 1984) is a Serbian retired footballer.
