= Martin Hurt =

Estonian footballer

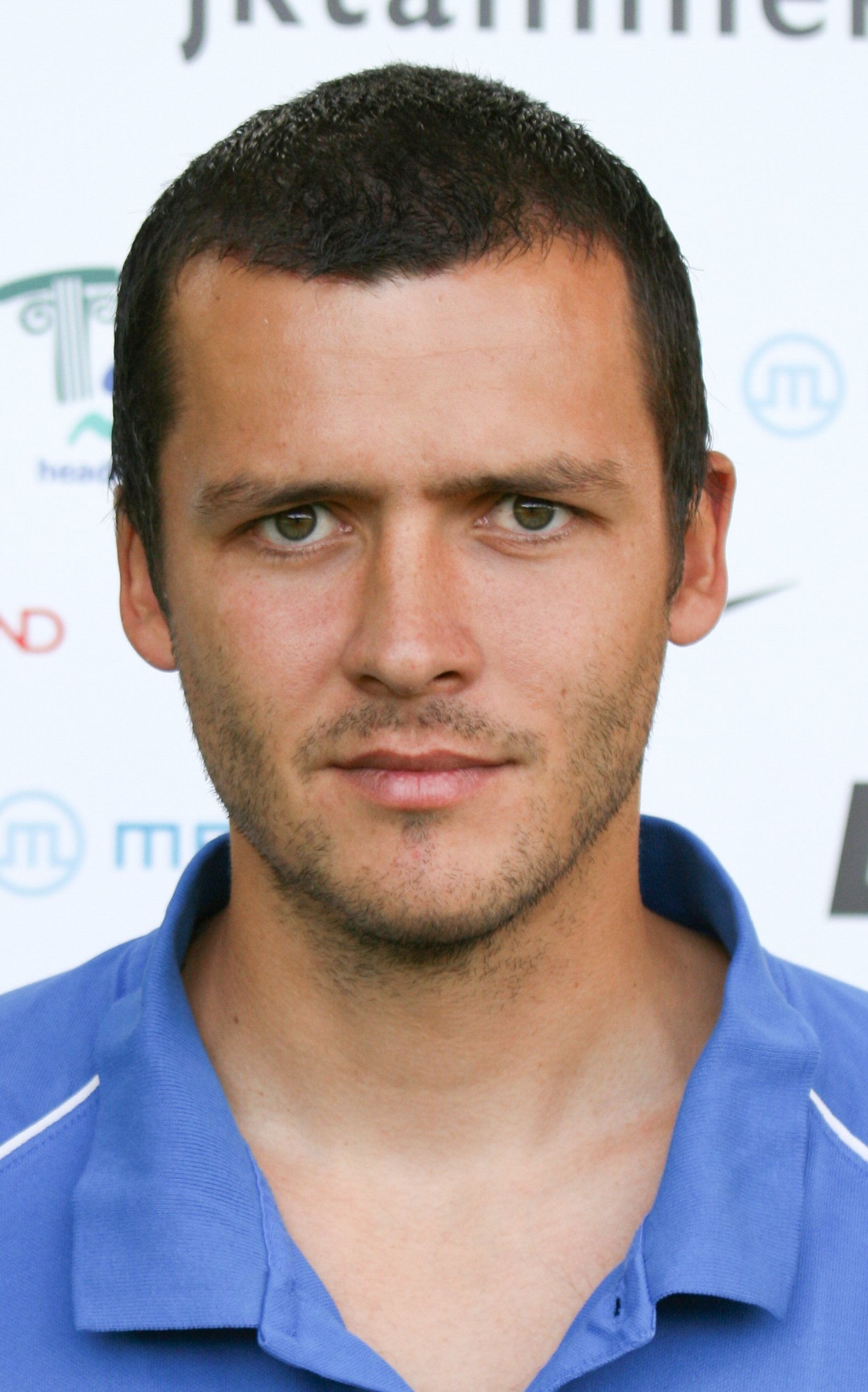

Personal information
- Date of birth: 27 June 1984 (age 42)
- Place of birth: Tartu, then part of Estonian SSR, Soviet Union
- Height: 1.82 m (6 ft 0 in)
- Position: Defender

Youth career
- Tartu Jalgpallikool Tammeka
- 1999–2000: FC Lelle

Senior career*
Years	Team	Apps	(Gls)
1999–2000	FC Lelle		
2001	JK Tervis Pärnu	6	(2)
2002–2003	FC Warrior Valga	12	(0)
2003	→ Hiiumaa ÜJK Emmaste	22	(7)
2004–2005	JK Tulevik Viljandi	46	(5)
2004	→ FC Elva	2	(1)
2006–2008	FC Flora Tallinn	63	(5)
2006–2007	→ FC Flora II Tallinn	7	(0)
2009	JK Nõmme Kalju	33	(0)
2010–2011	Nyíregyháza Spartacus	8	(0)
2012–2015	JK Tammeka Tartu	79	(17)

International career
	Estonia U16	1	(0)
	Estonia U17	4	(1)
	Estonia U19	6	(0)
	Estonia U21	9	(0)
- * Club domestic league appearances and goals

Martin Hurt (born 27 June 1984, in Tartu) is a retired Estonian professional footballer, who last played for JK Tammeka Tartu. He played the position of defender or midfielder.
