= Diego Balbinot =

Brazilian footballer (born 1984)

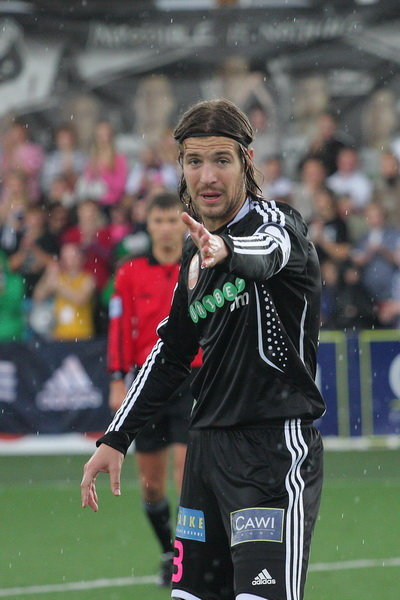

Personal information
- Full name: Diego Douglas Balbinot
- Date of birth: 7 January 1984 (age 42)
- Place of birth: Bento Gonçalves, Brazil
- Height: 1.90 m (6 ft 3 in)
- Position: Centre back

Youth career
- 1993–2003: Esportivo

Senior career*
Years	Team	Apps	(Gls)
2004–2005	Esportivo	?	(?)
2006	Confiança	?	(?)
2006–2007	Sertãozinho	?	(?)
2007	Olímpia	13	(1)
2007–2008	Workable FC	25	(1)
2009	Nõmme Kalju	23	(2)
2010	Nyíregyháza Spartacus	9	(1)
2011	Hibernians	8	(0)
2012–2014	3 de Febrero	56	(3)
2015	Nacional-PR	10	(0)
2015	Lajeadense	2	(0)
2016	Valletta	2	(0)
- * Club domestic league appearances and goals

Diego Douglas Balbinot (born 7 January 1984) is a retired Brazilian footballer with Italian Passport. He played as a defender.

== Honours ==
=== Club ===
JK Nõmme Kalju

- Estonian Cup: Runners Up: 2008–09

3 de Febrero

- División Intermedia: Champion: 2013
