= 2007–08 Diósgyőri VTK season =

Diósgyőr
2007–08 season
- Manager: János Pajkos (until 29 September 2007); Károly Földesi (caretaker, from 29 September 2007 to 4 October 2007); Attila Vágó (from 4 October 2007)
- Stadium: Diósgyőri Stadion
- Nemzeti Bajnokság I: 13th
- Magyar Kupa: Round of 16
- Ligakupa: Autumn season: Runners-up; Spring season: Group stage
- Highest home attendance: 9,000 v Rákospalota (29 September 2007, Nemzeti Bajnokság I)
- Lowest home attendance: 300 v Vasas (1 December 2007, Ligakupa)
- Average home league attendance: 4,714
- Biggest win: 3–0 v Eger (Away, 28 August 2007, Magyar Kupa); 4–1 v Debrecen (Away, 31 October 2007, Ligakupa); 3–0 v Vasas (Home, 1 December 2007, Ligakupa); 3–0 v Sopron (Home, 3 May 2008, Nemzeti Bajnokság I)
- Biggest defeat: 1–5 v Győr (Away, 24 November 2007, Nemzeti Bajnokság I); 0–4 v Siófok (Away, 1 March 2008, Nemzeti Bajnokság I)

The 2007–08 season was Diósgyőri Vasgyárak Testgyakorló Köre's 44th competitive season, 4th consecutive season in the Nemzeti Bajnokság I and 96th season in existence as a football club. In addition to the domestic league, Diósgyőr participated in that season's editions of the Magyar Kupa and the Ligakupa.

== Squad ==
Squad at end of season

Note: Flags indicate national team as defined under FIFA eligibility rules; some limited exceptions apply. Players may hold more than one non-FIFA nationality.

| No. | Pos. | Nation | Player |
|---|---|---|---|
| 1 | GK | HUN | Zsolt Dénes |
| 2 | DF | HUN | Norbert Kállai |
| 3 | DF | HUN | Norbert Elek |
| 4 | DF | HUN | Gergely Vida |
| 5 | DF | HUN | Vilmos Sebők |
| 6 | MF | HUN | Zoltán Pintér |
| 7 | MF | HUN | Béla Lakatos |
| 8 | MF | HUN | Zoltán Vitelki |
| 9 | FW | HUN | Attila Simon |
| 11 | MF | SRB | Dane Trbović |
| 14 | MF | BIH | Đorđe Kamber |
| 16 | DF | HUN | Gábor Kerényi |
| 18 | FW | HUN | Tamás Nagy |

| No. | Pos. | Nation | Player |
|---|---|---|---|
| 19 | MF | HUN | Norbert Lipusz |
| 21 | FW | PAR | Gonzalo Cardozo |
| 23 | MF | ROU | Florin Pelecaci |
| 24 | FW | HUN | Dávid Kleiber |
| 26 | GK | HUN | László Köteles |
| 27 | MF | HUN | Tamás Szélpál |
| 28 | DF | HUN | Aladár Virág |
| 29 | MF | TOG | Kassim Guyazou |
| 33 | DF | HUN | Gyula Hegedűs |
| 66 | GK | HUN | István Kövesfalvi |
| 69 | DF | HUN | József Mogyorósi |
| 99 | FW | JPN | Kazuo Honma |

== Competitions ==
=== Overview ===
| Competition | First match | Last match | Starting round | Final position | Record | | | | | | | |
| Competition | First match | Last match | Starting round | Final position | Pld | W | D | L | GF | GA | GD | Win % |
|---|---|---|---|---|---|---|---|---|---|---|---|---|
| Nemzeti Bajnokság I | 22 July 2007 | 31 May 2008 | Matchday 1 | 13th | 30 | 5 | 13 | 12 | 43 | 63 | −20 | 16.67 |
| Magyar Kupa | 28 August 2007 | 6 November 2007 | Third round | Round of 16 | 4 | 2 | 1 | 1 | 8 | 5 | +3 | 50.00 |
| Ligakupa (Autumn season) | 15 August 2007 | 28 November 2007 | Group stage | Runners-up | 12 | 7 | 1 | 4 | 19 | 16 | +3 | 58.33 |
| Ligakupa (Spring season) | 1 December 2007 | 27 February 2008 | Group stage | Group stage | 6 | 1 | 1 | 4 | 8 | 12 | −4 | 16.67 |
| Total | | | | | 52 | 15 | 16 | 21 | 78 | 96 | −18 | 28.85 |

Source: Competitions

=== Nemzeti Bajnokság I ===
==== League table ====
| Pos | Team | Pld | W | D | L | GF | GA | GD | Pts | Qualification or relegation |
|---|---|---|---|---|---|---|---|---|---|---|
| 11 | Paks | 30 | 9 | 10 | 11 | 51 | 51 | 0 | 37 | |
| 12 | Rákospalota | 30 | 7 | 9 | 14 | 42 | 60 | −18 | 30 | |
| 13 | Diósgyőr | 30 | 5 | 13 | 12 | 43 | 63 | −20 | 28 | |
| 14 | Siófok | 30 | 6 | 9 | 15 | 33 | 46 | −13 | 27 | |
| 15 | Tatabánya (R) | 30 | 2 | 4 | 24 | 34 | 93 | −59 | 10 | Relegation to Nemzeti Bajnokság II |

Source: soccerway.com
(R) Relegated

==== Results summary ====
| Overall | | | | | | | | Home | | | | | | Away | | | | | |
| Pld | W | D | L | GF | GA | GD | Pts | W | D | L | GF | GA | GD | W | D | L | GF | GA | GD |
|---|---|---|---|---|---|---|---|---|---|---|---|---|---|---|---|---|---|---|---|
| 30 | 5 | 13 | 12 | 43 | 63 | −20 | 28 | 3 | 6 | 6 | 24 | 29 | −5 | 2 | 7 | 6 | 19 | 34 | −15 |

Source: Hungarian Football Federation

==== Matches ====
| 22 July 2007 1 | Diósgyőr | 1–2 | Debrecen | Miskolc |
| 18:00 CEST (UTC+2) | Katona 21'; Abdou (yellow card) 88' | Report | Kouemaha 8', 16'; Bernáth (yellow card) 63'; Sidibe (yellow card) 70' | Stadium: Diósgyőri Stadion; Attendance: 6,000; Referee: Zoltán Iványi; Assistant referees: István Albert, János Medovarszki; Fourth official: Attila Hegedűs |

| 28 July 2007 2 | Diósgyőr | 0–3 | Siófok | Miskolc |
| 19:00 CEST (UTC+2) | Vitelki (yellow card) 20'; Elek (yellow card) 60' | Report | Forgács (yellow card) 2'; Kuttor 7'; Fülöp 48', 65' | Stadium: Diósgyőri Stadion; Attendance: 3,000; Referee: Szabolcs Szilasi; Assistant referees: Gábor Takács, Gyula Fehér; Fourth official: László Varga |

| 3 August 2007 3 | Zalaegerszeg | 4–1 | Diósgyőr | Zalaegerszeg |
| 19:00 CEST (UTC+2) | Pekič 17'; Polgár (yellow card) 59'; Waltner 69', 81' (pen.); Davidov (yellow card) 82'; Vulin 85' | Report | Abdou 28'; N. Farkas (red card) 61'; Lakatos (yellow card) 80' | Stadium: ZTE Arena; Attendance: 5,500; Referee: Sándor Andó-Szabó; Assistant referees: Róbert Kispál, Zoltán Szalai; Fourth official: Gábor Oláh |

| 10 August 2007 4 | Diósgyőr | 2–2 | MTK | Miskolc |
| 19:00 CEST (UTC+2) | Carr 30'; Elek 90+2' | Report | Urbán 45', 55' | Stadium: Diósgyőri Stadion; Attendance: 3,000; Referee: Tamás Arany; Assistant referees: Attila Kelemen, István Tóth; Fourth official: Tibor Gyarmati II |

| 18 August 2007 5 | Kaposvár | 1–1 | Diósgyőr | Kaposvár |
| 19:00 CEST (UTC+2) | Zahorecz (yellow card) 10'; Oláh 48'; Petrók (yellow card) 64'; Pest (red card) 90+2' | Report | A. Simon 7'; Abdou (yellow card) 38'; Kállai (yellow card) 59'; Köteles (yellow card) 71' | Stadium: Rákóczi Stadion; Attendance: 3,000; Referee: Ferenc Bede; Assistant referees: Zoltán Tompos, Balázs Farkas; Fourth official: István Kelemen |

| 24 August 2007 6 | Diósgyőr | 2–2 | Honvéd | Miskolc |
| 19:00 CEST (UTC+2) | Sipeki 18'; A. Simon 23' | Report | Hercegfalvi 15', 81'; Pomper (red card) 85' | Stadium: Diósgyőri Stadion; Attendance: 3,000; Referee: Zoltán Iványi; Assistant referees: István Albert, János Medovarszki; Fourth official: Attila Hegedűs |

| 31 August 2007 7 | Vasas | 0–0 | Diósgyőr | Budapest |
| 19:00 CEST (UTC+2) | | Report | Katona (yellow card) 63'; Vitelki (yellow card) 68'; N. Farkas (yellow card) 78' | Stadium: Illovszky Rudolf Stadion; Attendance: 2,500; Referee: Roland Veizer; Assistant referees: Zoltán Kovács, Szabolcs Deutsch; Fourth official: Ádám Németh |

| 15 September 2007 8 | Diósgyőr | 0–0 | Nyíregyháza | Miskolc |
| 18:00 CEST (UTC+2) | Katona (yellow card) 19'; Carr (yellow card) 79'; Köteles (yellow card) 89' | Report | Zaleh (yellow card) 21'; Miskolczi (yellow card) 23'; Hegedűs (yellow card) 52'; Bagoly (yellow card) 79'; Cséke (yellow card) 89' | Stadium: Diósgyőri Stadion; Attendance: 7,500; Referee: Zsolt Szabó; Assistant referees: Róbert Kispál, István Tóth; Fourth official: Tibor Farkas |

| 21 September 2007 9 | Tatabánya | 2–2 | Diósgyőr | Tatabánya |
| 16:00 CEST (UTC+2) | Z. Balogh (yellow card) 53'; M. Takács 75'; Hajdú 80'; Filó (yellow card) 87'; Kichi (yellow card) 90+1' | Report | A. Simon 5'; Abdou 40'; Navarrete (yellow card) 67'; N. Farkas (yellow card) 87'; Hegedűs (yellow card) 88' | Stadium: Városi Stadion; Attendance: 400; Referee: Péter Solymosi; Assistant referees: Gábor Takács, Imre Attila Nagy; Fourth official: Imre Schnellbach |

| 29 September 2007 10 | Diósgyőr | 0–1 | Rákospalota | Miskolc |
| 18:00 CEST (UTC+2) | Hegedűs (yellow card) 10'; N. Farkas (yellow card) 60' | Report | Rása (yellow card) 43'; G. Horváth I (yellow card) 50'; Torma (yellow card) 81'; Erős (yellow card) 82'; Nyerges 90' | Stadium: Diósgyőri Stadion; Attendance: 9,000; Referee: József Berger; Assistant referees: Attila Forgács, Tibor Vígh; Fourth official: Péter Pető |

| 6 October 2007 11 | Sopron | 0–1 | Diósgyőr | Sopron |
| 18:00 CEST (UTC+2) | A. Farkas (yellow card) 30' | Report | A. Simon 14'; Ebala (yellow card) 29'; Rassou (red card) 65'; N'Gam (yellow card) 86' | Stadium: Káposztás utcai Stadion; Attendance: 2,900; Referee: Ferenc Bede; Assistant referees: Zoltán Tompos, Balázs Farkas; Fourth official: Gergő Janitz |

| 19 October 2007 12 | Diósgyőr | 2–0 | Fehérvár | Miskolc |
| 19:00 CEST (UTC+2) | A. Simon (yellow card) 27', (goal) 86'; Sipeki 47' | Report | Božić (yellow card) 20'; Mohl (yellow card) 31'; G. Horváth II (yellow card) 80' | Stadium: Diósgyőri Stadion; Attendance: 2,000; Referee: Csaba Imre Sápi; Assistant referees: Péter Berettyán, Gyula Fehér; Fourth official: János Guta |

| 3 November 2007 13 | Paks | 2–2 | Diósgyőr | Paks |
| 13:30 CET (UTC+1) | Tamási (yellow card) 22'; Molnár (yellow card) 32'; Tököli 79'; T. Kiss I 90' | Report | Bessong (yellow card) 35'; A. Simon 42'; Sipeki 65' | Stadium: Fehérvári úti Stadion; Attendance: 1,000; Referee: Viktor Kassai; Assistant referees: Gábor Erős, Tibor Vámos; Fourth official: Tibor Farkas |

| 9 November 2007 14 | Diósgyőr | 1–4 | Újpest | Miskolc |
| 19:00 CET (UTC+1) | Bessong 22'; Elek (yellow card) 38'; Kállai (yellow card) 51'; Köteles (yellow card) 56' | Report | Z. Kovács I 11'; Sadjo (yellow card) 25', (goal) 57' (pen.); Tisza (yellow card) 28', (goal) 53' (pen.); Kéthévoama (yellow card) 38', (goal) 73' (pen.); Habi (yellow card) 50' | Stadium: Diósgyőri Stadion; Attendance: 4,000; Referee: Péter Solymosi; Assistant referees: Dr. Péter Hegyi, Zsolt Butkai; Fourth official: Gábor Fajkusz |

| 24 November 2007 15 | Győr | 5–1 | Diósgyőr | Győr |
| 13:00 CET (UTC+1) | Józsi 2'; Bajzát 35', 70'; Z. Kovács II (yellow card) 36', (goal) 90+1'; Bogdanović (yellow card) 40', (goal) 54'; Völgyi (yellow card) 44' | Report | Ebala 10'; Bessong (yellow card) 41'; N. Farkas (yellow card) 84' | Stadium: ETO Park; Attendance: 1,800; Referee: Csaba Imre Sápi; Assistant referees: Zoltán Tompos, Lajos L. Tóth; Fourth official: Péter Berettyán |

| 22 February 2008 16 | Debrecen | 3–0 | Diósgyőr | Debrecen |
| 19:00 CET (UTC+1) | T. Sándor (yellow card) 25'; Kerekes 69', 90+3', (yellow card) 90+3'; Z. Kiss 75'; Vukmir (yellow card) 90+2' | Report | Kamber (yellow card) 35'; Cardozo (yellow card) 79' | Stadium: Oláh Gábor utcai Stadion; Attendance: 4,500; Referee: István Vad; Assistant referees: György Ring, István Tóth; Fourth official: Tibor Gyarmati II |

| 1 March 2008 17 | Siófok | 4–0 | Diósgyőr | Siófok |
| 16:00 CET (UTC+1) | Magasföldi 25', 64'; Tusori (yellow card) 27'; Bonifert 75'; Melczer 89' | Report | Z. Pintér (red card) 45'; Mogyorósi (yellow card) 67' | Stadium: Révész Géza utcai Stadion; Attendance: 400; Referee: Sándor Andó-Szabó; Assistant referees: Gábor Takács, Zsolt Márton; Fourth official: Tibor Farkas |

| 8 March 2008 18 | Diósgyőr | 1–1 | Zalaegerszeg | Miskolc |
| 16:00 CET (UTC+1) | Vitelki (yellow card) 46'; V. Sebők 90+1' | Report | Miljatovič (yellow card) 17'; Waltner 59', (yellow card) 83'; B. Molnár (yellow card) 90+2' | Stadium: Diósgyőri Stadion; Attendance: 3,000; Referee: Ferenc Bede; Assistant referees: Vencel Tóth II, Gyula Fehér; Fourth official: József Erdős |

| 17 March 2008 19 | MTK | 1–1 | Diósgyőr | Budapest |
| 18:00 CET (UTC+1) | Kanta 55'; Pátkai (yellow card) 82'; Pollák (yellow card) 90' | Report | Z. Pintér (yellow card) 34'; Mogyorósi (yellow card) 45'; Kállai (yellow card) 64'; Elek (yellow card) 73'; Honma 90' | Stadium: Hidegkuti Nándor Stadion; Attendance: 700; Referee: Tamás Bognár; Assistant referees: Dr. Péter Szabó, Zoltán Kovács; Fourth official: Csaba Pintér |

| 22 March 2008 20 | Diósgyőr | 2–1 | Kaposvár | Miskolc |
| 16:00 CET (UTC+1) | V. Sebők 66', (red card) 90+3'; Hegedűs (yellow card) 67'; Cardozo 83' | Report | Leandro 11'; Graszl (yellow card) 60'; Ribi (yellow card) 75' | Stadium: Diósgyőri Stadion; Attendance: 3,000; Referee: Roland Veizer; Assistant referees: Attila Kelemen, István Tóth; Fourth official: János Guta |

| 28 March 2008 21 | Honvéd | 0–1 | Diósgyőr | Budapest |
| 19:00 CET (UTC+1) | Ivancsics (yellow card) 44' | Report | Z. Pintér (yellow card) 17'; Mogyorósi (yellow card) 21'; Honma 79'; Kerényi (yellow card) 87' | Stadium: Bozsik József Stadion; Attendance: 1,200; Referee: Zsolt Szabó; Assistant referees: Róbert Kispál, Vencel Tóth II; Fourth official: Gábor Oláh |

| 5 April 2008 22 | Diósgyőr | 4–5 | Vasas | Miskolc |
| 19:00 CEST (UTC+2) | Honma 21'; A. Simon 44'; Cardozo (yellow card) 75'; Köteles (red card) 82'; Lipusz 89'; Elek 90' | Report | Kincses 26'; Pavičević 41', (yellow card) 72'; Sowunmi 59'; N. Németh 74', 83'; Jovánczai (yellow card) 90+1' | Stadium: Diósgyőri Stadion; Attendance: 5,000; Referee: Viktor Kassai; Assistant referees: Gábor Erős, Tibor Vámos; Fourth official: József Erdős |

| 12 April 2008 23 | Nyíregyháza | 2–1 | Diósgyőr | Nyíregyháza |
| 19:00 CEST (UTC+2) | Granát 12'; Miskolczi 45', (yellow card) 54' | Report | V. Sebők (yellow card) 16'; Kamber (red card) 42'; Hegedűs (yellow card) 53'; Honma 55' | Stadium: Városi Stadion; Attendance: 8,000; Referee: István Mészáros; Assistant referees: László Viszokai, Gyula Fehér; Fourth official: László Varga |

| 19 April 2008 24 | Diósgyőr | 2–2 | Tatabánya | Miskolc |
| 19:00 CEST (UTC+2) | A. Simon 68', 70' | Report | I. Kovács (yellow card) 32'; Kichi 42'; Megyesi 45'; Kurucz (yellow card) 68'; Dienes (yellow card) 71'; V. Farkas (yellow card) 85' | Stadium: Diósgyőri Stadion; Attendance: 3,000; Referee: Ádám Németh; Assistant referees: Tibor Vígh, János Agócs; Fourth official: István Kelemen |

| 26 April 2008 25 | Rákospalota | 5–5 | Diósgyőr | Sopron (Note: The match was played at the Káposztás utcai Stadion in Sopron, instead of Rákospalota regular stadium, the Budai II. László Stadion in Budapest, which did not meet HFF requirements.) |
| 19:00 CEST (UTC+2) | Dancs 36', 52'; Erős (yellow card) 40'; G. Horváth I (yellow card) 52'; Kőhalmi (yellow card) 65'; Z. Varga 68'; Somorjai 76' (pen.), 81' (pen.) | Report | Köteles (yellow card) 22'; A. Simon 24', 50'; Z. Pintér (yellow card) 40'; Honma 45', 77'; Kamber 70'; Hegedűs (yellow card) 75' | Stadium: Káposztás utcai Stadion; Attendance: 500; Referee: Mawla Hussain (Qatar); Assistant referees: Gábor Erős (Hungary), Ali Elisa Rasid (Qatar); Fourth official: Balázs Böcskei (Hungary) |

| 3 May 2008 26 | Diósgyőr | 3–0 (awd.) | Sopron | Miskolc |
| | | Report | | Stadium: Diósgyőri Stadion |
Note: After the exclusion of Sopron, the matches were registered with a goal difference of 3–0.

| 10 May 2008 27 | Fehérvár | 3–1 | Diósgyőr | Székesfehérvár |
| 19:00 CEST (UTC+2) | Sitku 56'; Dvéri 81'; D. Nagy 90' | Report | Z. Pintér (yellow card) 41', (goal) 70'; V. Sebők (yellow card) 45'; Kamber (yellow card) 70' | Stadium: Sóstói Stadion; Attendance: 3,015; Referee: Szabolcs Szilasi; Assistant referees: Oszkár Lémon, Attila Beidek; Fourth official: Dávid Ákos |

| 17 May 2008 28 | Diósgyőr | 3–3 | Paks | Miskolc |
| 19:00 CEST (UTC+2) | Szélpál (yellow card) 39'; A. Simon 49', 58', 82'; Sebők (yellow card) 51' | Report | S. Horváth (yellow card) 15'; Böde 31', (yellow card) 76'; Tököli 40' (pen.), 69'; Báló (yellow card) 80' | Stadium: Diósgyőri Stadion; Attendance: 6,500; Referee: Ádám Németh; Assistant referees: Attila Kelemen, Gyula Fehér; Fourth official: István Kelemen |

| 25 May 2008 29 | Újpest | 2–2 | Diósgyőr | Budapest |
| 18:00 CEST (UTC+2) | Kéthévoama 53'; G. Sándor 55'; Habi (yellow card) 84' | Report | Honma 27'; Virág 29', (yellow card) 29' | Stadium: Szusza Ferenc Stadion; Attendance: 3,291; Referee: István Vad; Assistant referees: Tibor Vámos, Zsolt Butkai; Fourth official: Gergő Janitz |

| 31 May 2008 30 | Diósgyőr | 1–3 | Győr | Miskolc |
| 15:00 CEST (UTC+2) | Vitelki (yellow card) 70'; Kamber 86' | Report | Šupić (yellow card) 20'; Böőr 43'; Brnović 55'; Bajzát 76'; M. Kiss (yellow card) 90+2' | Stadium: Diósgyőri Stadion; Attendance: 5,000; Referee: Ferenc Bede; Assistant referees: Róbert Kispál, Balázs Farkas; Fourth official: Gábor Oláh |

=== Magyar Kupa ===
| 28 August 2007 Third round | Eger | 0–3 | Diósgyőr | Eger |
| 16:30 CEST (UTC+2) | G. Nagy (yellow card) 57' | Report | Abdou 10'; A. Simon (yellow card) 18', (goal) 50'; Huszák (yellow card) 46'; Sipeki 68' | Stadium: Szentmarjay Tibor Városi Stadion; Attendance: 1,000; Referee: Gergely Sulyok; Assistant referees: János Csák, Krisztián Selmeczi |

| 26 September 2007 Round of 32 | Mezőkövesd | 1–3 | Diósgyőr | Mezőkövesd |
| 15:00 CEST (UTC+2) | Busai (yellow card) 21'; Ragó (yellow card) 62'; Olasz 82' | Report | A. Simon 18'; Lakatos (yellow card) 34'; Fodor (yellow card) 38'; Abdou 48'; Rebecsák 74' | Stadium: Városi Stadion; Attendance: 1,200; Referee: Csaba Imre Sápi; Assistant referees: Attila Kelemen, Péter Berettyán |

==== Round of 16 ====
| 24 October 2007 First leg | Kazincbarcika | 3–1 | Diósgyőr | Kazincbarcika |
| 14:30 CEST (UTC+2) | Binder 45', 64'; Zimányi (yellow card) 53'; Stevica (yellow card) 59'; P. Kovács 81' | Report | Katona (yellow card) 17'; N'Gam (yellow card) 49'; Vitelki (red card) 59'; Lipusz 73' | Stadium: Pete András Stadion; Attendance: 3,000; Referee: Abdul Rahman Abdul (Qatar); Assistant referees: Róbert Kispál (Hungary), Darman (Qatar) |

| 6 November 2007 Second leg | Diósgyőr | 1–1 (2–4 agg.) | Kazincbarcika | Miskolc |
| 17:00 CET (UTC+1) | Lakatos (yellow card) 35'; Abdou (yellow card) 36', (goal) 65'; Sipeki (yellow card) 42'; Vámosi (yellow card) 61' | Report | T. Nagy (yellow card) 25'; Stevica 45'; Elek (yellow card) 47' | Stadium: Diósgyőri Stadion; Attendance: 1,500; Referee: József Berger; Assistant referees: Attila Forgács, Tibor Vígh |
Note: Kazincbarcika won 4–2 on aggregate.

=== Ligakupa ===
==== Autumn season ====
===== Group stage =====
| Pos | Team | Pld | W | D | L | GF | GA | GD | Pts | Qualification | DEB | DIO | NYI | VAS |
|---|---|---|---|---|---|---|---|---|---|---|---|---|---|---|
| 1 | Debrecen | 6 | 3 | 2 | 1 | 10 | 6 | +4 | 11 | Advance to knockout phase | — | 1–1 | 3–2 | 3–0 |
| 2 | Diósgyőr | 6 | 3 | 1 | 2 | 6 | 6 | 0 | 10 | Advance to knockout phase | 2–0 | — | 1–0 | 2–1 |
| 3 | Nyíregyháza | 6 | 3 | 0 | 3 | 8 | 6 | +2 | 9 | | 0–2 | 1–0 | — | 4–0 |
| 4 | Vasas | 6 | 1 | 1 | 4 | 5 | 11 | −6 | 4 | | 1–1 | 3–0 | 0–1 | — |

Source: HFF

| 15 August 2007 1 | Diósgyőr | 2–0 | Debrecen | Miskolc |
| 19:00 CEST (UTC+2) | Simon 60'; Kállai (red card) 77'; Lipusz 86' | Report | Spitzmüller (yellow card) 17'; Bíró (red card) 73' | Stadium: Diósgyőri Stadion; Attendance: 1,500; Referee: Péter Solymosi; Assistant referees: István Szécsényi, Zsolt Márton |

| 22 August 2007 2 | Vasas | 3–0 | Diósgyőr | Budapest |
| 16:00 CEST (UTC+2) | Rebryk 6'; Skita 14'; Bükszegi 24'; Balogh (yellow card) 53'; Pandur (yellow card) 60'; Tandari (yellow card) 87' | Report | | Stadium: Illovszky Rudolf Stadion; Attendance: 400; Referee: József Erdős; Assistant referees: István Albert, Dr. Ádám Vári |

| 9 September 2007 3 | Diósgyőr | 1–0 | Nyíregyháza | Miskolc |
| 19:00 CEST (UTC+2) | Ebala (yellow card) 53', (goal) 68'; Kállai (yellow card) 54' | Report | Bagoly (yellow card) 39'; Vukadinović (yellow card) 75'; Cséke (yellow card) 83' | Stadium: Diósgyőri Stadion; Attendance: 1,500; Referee: Krisztián Pánczél assistantreferees = György Ring, Attila Kelemen |

| 19 September 2007 4 | Nyíregyháza | 1–0 | Diósgyőr | Nyíregyháza |
| 16:00 CEST (UTC+2) | Moldovan 41'; Ambrusz (yellow card) 55' | Report | Vámosi (yellow card) 85' | Stadium: Városi Stadion; Attendance: 1,200; Referee: Ádám Németh; Assistant referees: Zsolt Márton, Ferenc Varga |

| 3 October 2007 5 | Debrecen | 1–1 | Diósgyőr | Debrecen |
| 18:00 CEST (UTC+2) | Kouemaha 61'; Komlósi (yellow card) 85' | Report | N'Gam 43'; Lipusz (yellow card) 75' | Stadium: Oláh Gábor utcai Stadion; Attendance: 1,500; Referee: Gergely Sulyok; Assistant referees: Zsolt Szpisják, Dr. Ádám Vári |

| 10 October 2007 6 | Diósgyőr | 2–1 | Vasas | Miskolc |
| 18:00 CEST (UTC+2) | Ebala 39'; Bessong 43' | Report | Sowunmi 21' | Stadium: Diósgyőri Stadion; Attendance: 1,800; Referee: Zoltán Iványi; Assistant referees: István Albert, Gyula Fehér |

===== Knockout phase =====
====== Quarter-finals ======
| 16 October 2007 First leg | Tatabánya | 1–2 | Diósgyőr | Tatabánya |
| 14:30 CEST (UTC+2) | B. Balogh (yellow card) 26'; Megyesi 89'; Kriston (yellow card) 90+1' | Report | Simon 9', 48'; Kállai (yellow card) 30'; Bessong (yellow card) 89' | Stadium: Városi Stadion; Attendance: 200; Referee: István Mészáros; Assistant referees: Dr. Péter Kovács, Imre Attila Nagy |

| 26 October 2007 Second leg | Diósgyőr | 3–1 (5–2 agg.) | Tatabánya | Miskolc |
| 18:00 CEST (UTC+2) | Simon 21'; Guyazou (yellow card) 44'; Farkas 82'; Lipusz 89' | Report | A. Németh (yellow card) 41'; Kichi (yellow card) 79'; M. Takács 84' | Stadium: Diósgyőri Stadion; Attendance: 1,500; Referee: Gyöngyi Gaál; Assistant referees: Gyula Fehér, Zsolt Butkai |
Note: Diósgyőr won 5–2 on aggregate.

====== Semi-finals ======
| 31 October 2007 First leg | Debrecen | 1–4 | Diósgyőr | Debrecen |
| 18:00 CET (UTC+1) | Sidibe 49'; Z. Nagy (yellow card) 52'; Bíró (yellow card) 80' | Report | Hegedűs (yellow card) 6'; Katona 18'; A. Simon 28', 58', (yellow card) 42'; Lipusz 68' | Stadium: Oláh Gábor utcai Stadion; Attendance: 500; Referee: Sándor Andó-Szabó; Assistant referees: Zsolt Márton, György Ring |

| 14 November 2007 Second leg | Diósgyőr | 2–3 (6–4 agg.) | Debrecen | Miskolc |
| 18:00 CET (UTC+1) | Sipeki (yellow card) 28'; Vukmir 48' (o.g.); A. Simon 60'; N. Farkas (yellow card) 82' | Report | Komlósi (yellow card) 26'; P. Szilágyi 28', 32'; Szatmári (yellow card) 59'; Kouemaha 90+1' | Stadium: Diósgyőri Stadion; Attendance: 1,000; Referee: Zsolt Szabó; Assistant referees: Róbert Kispál, Attila Kelemen |
Note: Diósgyőr won 6–4 on aggregate.

====== Final ======
| 18 November 2007 First leg | Fehérvár | 3–0 | Diósgyőr | Székesfehérvár |
| 18:00 CET (UTC+1) | Božić (yellow card) 8'; Simek 38'; Dvéri 51'; Sitku 59'; G. Horváth II (red card) 90' | Report | Guyazou (red card) 34' | Stadium: Sóstói Stadion; Attendance: 1,000; Referee: Ferenc Bede; Assistant referees: Gyula Fehér, István Tóth; Fourth official: Ádám Németh |

| 28 November 2007 Second leg | Diósgyőr | 2–1 (2–4 agg.) | Fehérvár | Miskolc |
| 18:00 CET (UTC+1) | A. Simon 77'; Huszák 84' | Report | Sitku 70', (yellow card) 72'; Mohl (yellow card) 74'; B. Farkas (yellow card) 83'; Vayer (yellow card) 86'; Csobánki (red card) 89' | Stadium: Diósgyőri Stadion; Attendance: 1,000; Referee: Zsolt Szabó; Assistant referees: Róbert Kispál, Dr. Péter Hegyi; Fourth official: Péter Pető |
Note: Fehérvár won 4–2 on aggregate and advanced to the Grand final.

==== Spring season ====
===== Group stage =====
| Pos | Team | Pld | W | D | L | GF | GA | GD | Pts | Qualification | MTK | UJP | VAS | DIO |
|---|---|---|---|---|---|---|---|---|---|---|---|---|---|---|
| 1 | MTK | 6 | 4 | 2 | 0 | 12 | 6 | +6 | 14 | Advance to knockout phase | — | 2–0 | 3–2 | 2–1 |
| 2 | Újpest | 6 | 3 | 0 | 3 | 14 | 9 | +5 | 9 | Advance to knockout phase | 1–3 | — | 1–2 | 3–1 |
| 3 | Vasas | 6 | 2 | 1 | 3 | 9 | 16 | −7 | 7 | | 1–1 | 0–7 | — | 4–1 |
| 4 | Diósgyőr | 6 | 1 | 1 | 4 | 8 | 12 | −4 | 4 | | 1–1 | 1–2 | 3–0 | — |

Source: HFF

| 1 December 2007 1 | Diósgyőr | 3–0 | Vasas | Miskolc |
| 13:00 CET (UTC+1) | Lipusz 50', 75'; Huszák 56' | Report | | Stadium: Diósgyőri Stadion; Attendance: 300; Referee: Roland Veizer; Assistant referees: Tibor Vígh, János Agócs |

| 5 December 2007 2 | Újpest | 3–1 | Diósgyőr | Budapest |
| 18:00 CET (UTC+1) | G. Sándor 29'; Bisoye (yellow card) 32'; Moldovan 50'; Z. Kovács I 63'; Mészáros (yellow card) 67' | Report | A. Simon 36'; Fodor (yellow card) 55' | Stadium: Szusza Ferenc Stadion; Attendance: 726; Referee: Tamás Arany; Assistant referees: Balázs Farkas, István Szécsényi |

| 8 December 2007 3 | MTK | 2–1 | Diósgyőr | Budapest |
| 13:00 CET (UTC+1) | Urbán 28'; Bori 66'; Pátkai (yellow card) 78' | Report | Lipusz 40'; Huszák (yellow card) 43'; Menyhért (yellow card) 83' | Stadium: Promontor utcai Stadion; Attendance: 200; Referee: Péter Pető; Assistant referees: Gyula Fehér, György Ring |

| 16 February 2008 4 | Diósgyőr | 1–2 | Újpest | Miskolc |
| 14:00 CET (UTC+1) | Z. Pintér (yellow card) 4'; Elek (yellow card) 14'; V. Sebők (yellow card) 27'; Cardozo 52'; Mogyorósi (yellow card) 64' | Report | Dourandi 7'; Božić (yellow card) 62'; Tisza 67' | Stadium: Diósgyőri Stadion; Attendance: 3,000; Referee: István Mészáros; Assistant referees: László Viszokai, Ferenc Varga |

| 19 February 2008 5 | Vasas | 4–1 | Diósgyőr | Budapest |
| 13:00 CET (UTC+1) | Piller 13', 60'; Divić 23'; M. Kiss 35' | Report | Vitelki 54' | Stadium: Szamosi Mihály Sporttelep; Attendance: 200; Referee: Tamás Arany; Assistant referees: Balázs Farkas, István Szécsényi |

| 27 February 2008 6 | Diósgyőr | 1–1 | MTK | Miskolc |
| 14:00 CET (UTC+1) | Simon 18'; Honma (yellow card) 75' | Report | Rodenbücher 90+1' | Stadium: Diósgyőri Stadion; Attendance: 500; Referee: Csaba Imre Sápi; Assistant referees: Péter Berettyán, János Guta |
