= 2008–09 Diósgyőri VTK season =

Diósgyőr
2008–09 season
- Chairman: Sándor Baranyi
- Manager: Attila Vágó (until 25 September 2008); Miklós Benczés (caretaker, from 25 September to 2 October); Tibor Sisa (from 2 October to 16 January 2009); György Gálhidi (from 21 January)
- Stadium: Diósgyőri Stadion
- Nemzeti Bajnokság I: 12th
- Magyar Kupa: Round of 32
- Ligakupa: Quarter-finals
- Highest home attendance: 6,000 (multiple Nemzeti Bajnokság I matches)
- Lowest home attendance: 300 v Vasas (5 November 2008, Ligakupa)
- Average home league attendance: 3,767
- Biggest win: 5–0 v Bőcs (Home, 29 November 2008, Ligakupa)
- Biggest defeat: 0–6 v Győr (Away, 20 September 2008, Nemzeti Bajnokság I)

The 2008–09 season was Diósgyőri Vasgyárak Testgyakorló Köre's 45th competitive season, 5th consecutive season in the Nemzeti Bajnokság I and 97th season in existence as a football club. In addition to the domestic league, Diósgyőr participated in that season's editions of the Magyar Kupa and the Ligakupa.

== Squad ==
Squad at end of season

Note: Flags indicate national team as defined under FIFA eligibility rules; some limited exceptions apply. Players may hold more than one non-FIFA nationality.

No.	Pos.	Nation	Player
1	GK	HUN	László Köteles
2	DF	HUN	Norbert Kállai
3	DF	SRB	Boris Miličić
5	DF	SRB	Milan Bogunović
6	DF	HUN	Gergő Menyhért
7	MF	HUN	Béla Lakatos
9	DF	HUN	Gergő Gohér
10	MF	HUN	Péter Takács
12	DF	SRB	Despot Višković
13	MF	SRB	Srđan Stanić
14	MF	SRB	Đorđe Kamber
15	MF	HUN	Zoltán Búrány
17	DF	HUN	Tibor Bokros
18	MF	TOG	Euloge Ahodikpe
19	MF	HUN	Norbert Lipusz

No.	Pos.	Nation	Player
20	MF	HUN	Ádám Horváth
21	FW	HUN	Mihály Tóth
22	MF	HUN	Ádám Kovács
23	MF	ROU	Florin Pelecaci
24	FW	HUN	Dávid Kleiber
25	GK	HUN	Tamás Giák
26	DF	HUN	Gábor Nagy
27	MF	HUN	Tamás Szélpál
30	GK	SRB	Draško Vojinović
32	FW	SRB	Djordje Simić
33	FW	HUN	Viktor Szabó
41	MF	HUN	Szabolcs Horváth
79	MF	HUN	Ákos Lippai
99	FW	JPN	Kazuo Honma

== Competitions ==
=== Overview ===
Competition	First match	Last match	Starting round	Final position	Record							
Competition	First match	Last match	Starting round	Final position	Pld	W	D	L	GF	GA	GD	Win %
Nemzeti Bajnokság I	26 July 2008	30 May 2009	Matchday 1	12th	30	9	6	15	29	45	−16	30.00
Magyar Kupa	3 September 2008	24 September 2008	Third round	Round of 32	2	1	0	1	5	3	+2	50.00
Ligakupa	1 October 2008	25 March 2009	Group stage	Quarter-finals	12	6	4	2	22	10	+12	50.00
Total					44	16	10	18	56	58	−2	36.36

Source: Competitions

=== Nemzeti Bajnokság I ===
==== League table ====
Pos	Team	Pld	W	D	L	GF	GA	GD	Pts	Qualification or relegation
10	Vasas	30	11	5	14	42	52	−10	38	
11	Paks	30	9	8	13	38	51	−13	35	
12	Diósgyőr	30	9	6	15	29	45	−16	33	
13	Budapest Honvéd	30	8	8	14	31	46	−15	32	Qualification for Europa League third qualifying round (Note: Budapest Honvéd won the 2008–09 Hungarian Cup and thereby qualified for the third qualifying round of the UEFA Europa League.)
14	Nyíregyháza	30	7	11	12	32	41	−9	32	

Source: soccerway.com
Rules for classification: 1st points; 2nd overall wins; 3rd goal difference; 4th goals scored

==== Results summary ====
Overall								Home						Away					
Pld	W	D	L	GF	GA	GD	Pts	W	D	L	GF	GA	GD	W	D	L	GF	GA	GD
30	9	6	15	29	45	−16	33	8	2	5	16	13	+3	1	4	10	13	32	−19

Source: Hungarian Football Federation

==== Results by round ====
Round	1	2	3	4	5	6	7	8	9	10	11	12	13	14	15	16	17	18	19	20	21	22	23	24	25	26	27	28	29	30
Ground	A	H	A	H	A	A	H	A	H	A	H	A	H	A	H	H	A	H	A	H	H	A	H	A	H	A	H	A	H	A
Result	D	W	L	L	L	D	W	L	L	D	D	L	W	W	W	W	L	D	L	W	W	L	L	L	W	D	L	L	L	L
Position	8	4	10	12	15	14	13	14	14	14	14	14	14	14	12	10	12	13	13	10	8	9	11	11	11	11	11	12	12	12
Points	1	4	4	4	4	5	8	8	8	9	10	10	13	16	19	22	22	23	23	26	29	29	29	29	32	33	33	33	33	33

Source: Matches
A = Away; H = Home; W = Win; D = Draw; L = Loss

==== Matches ====
26 July 2008 1	Rákospalota	1–1	Diósgyőr	Budapest
20:00 CEST (UTC+2)	Cseri 27'; Kapcsos (yellow card) 45'	Report	Mi. Tóth 29'; Tchana (yellow card) 90'	Stadium: Budai II. László Stadion; Attendance: 1,000; Referee: Szabolcs Szilasi; Assistant referees: Oszkár Lémon, István Tóth; Fourth official: Péter Pető

2 August 2008 2	Diósgyőr	1–0	Kaposvár	Miskolc
20:00 CEST (UTC+2)	Honma 18'; Mi. Tóth (yellow card) 77'; Kamber (yellow card) 82'	Report	Graszl (yellow card) 18'; Grúz (yellow card) 31'; Obrić (yellow card) 67'	Stadium: Diósgyőri Stadion; Attendance: 4,500; Referee: József Berger; Assistant referees: Attila Forgács, Gábor Kormányos II; Fourth official: Gábor Fajkusz

8 August 2008 3	Honvéd	3–1	Diósgyőr	Budapest
19:00 CEST (UTC+2)	Hercegfalvi 24', 60', 90+2'; Ivancsics (yellow card) 60'; Gebro (yellow card) 85'	Report	Kamber (yellow card) 23'; Miličić (yellow card) 30'; Mi. Tóth 54'; V. Sebők (red card) 63'; Köteles (yellow card) 90+2'	Stadium: Bozsik József Stadion; Attendance: 1,500; Referee: István Vad; Assistant referees: Vencel Tóth II, Zoltán Szalai; Fourth official: Gergő Janitz

16 August 2008 4	Diósgyőr	2–3	MTK	Miskolc
20:00 CEST (UTC+2)	Z. Pintér (yellow card) 7'; Mi. Tóth 10'; Pelecaci (yellow card) 15'; Miličić 79'	Report	G. Nagy II 3', (yellow card) 65'; Pátkai 60'; Miličić 62' (o.g.); Melczer (yellow card) 65'	Stadium: Diósgyőri Stadion; Attendance: 4,000; Referee: Roland Veizer; Assistant referees: Péter Berettyán, Lajos L. Tóth; Fourth official: Csaba Sándor

22 August 2008 5	Vasas	3–2	Diósgyőr	Budapest
19:00 CEST (UTC+2)	Divić 22'; Lázok 41'; N. Németh 49'; Gyánó (yellow card) 90'	Report	Mi. Tóth (yellow card) 72', (goal) 83'; Pelecaci 90'	Stadium: Illovszky Rudolf Stadion; Attendance: 1,500; Referee: Gergely Sulyok; Assistant referees: Attila Kelemen, Zsolt Butkai; Fourth official: Ádám Farkas

30 August 2008 6	Paks	1–1	Diósgyőr	Paks
20:00 CEST (UTC+2)	Tököli 18'; Z. Molnár (yellow card) 33'; Báló (yellow card) 82'	Report	Kamber (yellow card) 18', (goal) 24'; Búrány (yellow card) 61'; Gohér (red card) 62'; Z. Pintér (yellow card) 75'; P. Takács (yellow card) 90'	Stadium: Fehérvári úti Stadion; Attendance: 2,500; Referee: Zsolt Szabó; Assistant referees: Róbert Kispál, Gábor Kormányos II; Fourth official: Gábor Fajkusz

13 September 2008 7	Diósgyőr	2–1	Zalaegerszeg	Miskolc
20:00 CEST (UTC+2)	Kamber 12', (yellow card) 54'; Z. Pintér (yellow card) 42'; Honma 64'	Report	Szamosi (yellow card) 15'; Miljatovič 31'; Petneházi (yellow card) 52'; Z. Tóth I (yellow card) 70'; Méyé (yellow card) 82'	Stadium: Diósgyőri Stadion; Attendance: 2,500; Referee: Sándor Andó-Szabó; Assistant referees: György Ring, Balázs Farkas; Fourth official: Gábor Oláh

20 September 2008 8	Győr	6–0	Diósgyőr	Győr
19:00 CEST (UTC+2)	Stark 10' (pen.); Zo. Kovács I 19', 45'; Bajzát 44', 55'; Völgyi 50'; Tokody (yellow card) 70'	Report	Stanić (yellow card) 28'; Miličić (yellow card) 57'	Stadium: ETO Park; Attendance: 1,800; Referee: Viktor Kassai; Assistant referees: Péter Berettyán, Lajos L. Tóth; Fourth official: Csaba Sándor

27 September 2008 9	Diósgyőr	0–1	Fehérvár	Miskolc
19:00 CEST (UTC+2)	Kamber (yellow card) 42'	Report	Simek 8'; Sifter (yellow card) 38'; Anđić (yellow card) 39'; Mohl (yellow card) 44'	Stadium: Diósgyőri Stadion; Attendance: 3,000; Referee: Zoltán Iványi; Assistant referees: Zsolt Szpisják, István Albert; Fourth official: Tibor Csatári

4 October 2008 10	Nyíregyháza	2–2	Diósgyőr	Nyíregyháza
18:00 CEST (UTC+2)	Apostu 19'; Ramos (yellow card) 36'; Miskolczi 63'	Report	Miličić 6', (yellow card) 24'; Mi. Tóth 16', (red card) 35'; V. Sebők (yellow card) 47'; Honma (yellow card) 67'	Stadium: Városi Stadion; Attendance: 5,000; Referee: Ferenc Bede; Assistant referees: György Ring, István Tóth; Fourth official: Gergő Király

19 October 2008 11	Diósgyőr	0–0	Újpest	Miskolc
17:30 CEST (UTC+2)		Report	Bori (yellow card) 35'; Pollák (yellow card) 77'; Rajczi (yellow card) 90'	Stadium: Diósgyőri Stadion; Attendance: 6,000; Referee: Tamás Arany; Assistant referees: Róbert Kispál, László Viszokai; Fourth official: Balázs Lak

25 October 2008 12	Siófok	4–1	Diósgyőr	Siófok
18:00 CEST (UTC+2)	Ndjodo 45', 51'; Magasföldi 46'; Mogyorósi (yellow card) 50'; Tusori 61'	Report	Miličić (yellow card) 27'; Tchana 63'; Z. Pintér (yellow card) 70'	Stadium: Révész Géza utcai Stadion; Attendance: 500; Referee: Péter Solymosi; Assistant referees: Zoltán Kis, István Iványi; Fourth official: Dávid Ákos

1 November 2008 13	Diósgyőr	1–0	Haladás	Miskolc
18:00 CET (UTC+1)	Kamber 25'; P. Takács (yellow card) 26'; Miličić (yellow card) 73'; Búrány (yellow card) 85'	Report	B. Molnár (yellow card) 5'; Vörös (yellow card) 35'; Rajos (yellow card) 62'; Kuttor (red card) 82'; N. Tóth (yellow card) 87'; N. Sipos (yellow card) 90+1'	Stadium: Diósgyőri Stadion; Attendance: 2,500; Referee: János Takács; Assistant referees: Lajos L. Tóth, Péter Berettyán; Fourth official: Gábor Bendik

8 November 2008 14	Debrecen	1–2	Diósgyőr	Debrecen
18:00 CET (UTC+1)	Leandro (yellow card) 11'; Rudolf 32'	Report	Mi. Tóth (yellow card) 13', (goal) 70'; P. Takács 64' (pen.)	Stadium: Oláh Gábor utcai Stadion; Attendance: 6,500; Referee: Ádám Németh; Assistant referees: Tibor Vámos, István Tóth; Fourth official: Péter Pető

15 November 2008 15	Diósgyőr	1–0	Kecskemét	Miskolc
18:00 CET (UTC+1)	Miličić 8', (yellow card) 16'; V. Sebők (yellow card) 51'	Report	Bagi (yellow card) 60'	Stadium: Diósgyőri Stadion; Attendance: 3,500; Referee: Tamás Arany; Assistant referees: Attila Kelemen, Gyula Fehér; Fourth official: Dániel Becséri

21 February 2009 16	Diósgyőr	2–1	Rákospalota	Miskolc
17:00 CET (UTC+1)	Mi. Tóth (yellow card) 21'; Honma 32'; Miličić (yellow card) 53'; P. Takács 65' (pen.), (yellow card) 73'; Bokros (yellow card) 81'	Report	Pomper (yellow card) 10'; Nyerges 35' (pen.); Erős (yellow card) 77'	Stadium: Diósgyőri Stadion; Attendance: 2,500; Referee: Ádám Németh; Assistant referees: Balázs Farkas, István Tóth; Fourth official: Gábor Oláh

7 March 2009 18	Diósgyőr	0–0	Honvéd	Miskolc
18:00 CET (UTC+1)		Report	Filó (red card) 55'; Lungu (red card) 90'	Stadium: Diósgyőri Stadion; Attendance: 5,500; Referee: József Berger; Assistant referees: Attila Forgács, Tibor Vígh; Fourth official: Eszter Urbán

15 March 2009 19	MTK	2–0	Diósgyőr	Budapest
17:30 CET (UTC+1)	J. Kanta 4' (pen.); Zsidai 16', (yellow card) 67'; Vadnai (yellow card) 57'	Report	Lippai (yellow card) 23'; Ahodikpe (yellow card) 50'; Kamber (yellow card) 59'; Stanić (yellow card) 66'	Stadium: Hidegkuti Nándor Stadion; Attendance: 800; Referee: Zoltán Iványi; Assistant referees: Zsolt Szpisják, István Albert; Fourth official: Gergő Király

22 March 2009 20	Diósgyőr	1–0	Vasas	Miskolc
17:30 CET (UTC+1)	Višković (yellow card) 19'; Bokros (yellow card) 73'; Honma 88'	Report		Stadium: Diósgyőri Stadion; Attendance: 3,500; Referee: Péter Solymosi; Assistant referees: Gábor Takács, István Tóth; Fourth official: Gábor Bendik

4 April 2009 21	Diósgyőr	1–0	Paks	Miskolc
19:00 CEST (UTC+2)	Kamber (yellow card) 14'; P. Takács (yellow card) 29'; Mi. Tóth 78'; Stanić (yellow card) 81'	Report	Zováth (yellow card) 15'; A. Pintér (yellow card) 76'; Tököli (yellow card) 80'	Stadium: Diósgyőri Stadion; Attendance: 3,500; Referee: Roland Veizer; Assistant referees: Zoltán Szalai, Róbert Horváth; Fourth official: Tibor Gyarmati II

12 April 2009 22	Zalaegerszeg	1–0	Diósgyőr	Zalaegerszeg
17:30 CEST (UTC+2)	Pavićević 65', (yellow card) 66'; Sluka (yellow card) 82'; R. Varga (yellow card) 90+1'	Report	V. Szabó (yellow card) 66'	Stadium: ZTE Arena; Attendance: 5,500; Referee: József Berger; Assistant referees: László Viszokai, Attila Forgács; Fourth official: Dániel Becséri

18 April 2009 23	Diósgyőr	2–3	Győr	Miskolc
19:00 CEST (UTC+2)	Mi. Tóth 32'; Kamber (yellow card) 70'; Stanić 72'	Report	Bajzát 6', 87'; Nyári (yellow card) 18'; Kink (yellow card) 31'; Jäkl (yellow card) 54', (goal) 66'; Stark (yellow card) 77'; Stevanović (yellow card) 82'; Aleksidze (yellow card) 85'	Stadium: Diósgyőri Stadion; Attendance: 4,000; Referee: Zoltán Iványi; Assistant referees: István Albert, Péter Berettyán; Fourth official: Gábor Bendik

25 April 2009 24	Fehérvár	2–1	Diósgyőr	Székesfehérvár
19:00 CEST (UTC+2)	Vujović 21'; Alves 33'; Radović (yellow card) 81'	Report	Honma 40'; Gohér (yellow card) 44'; Kamber (yellow card) 51'	Stadium: Sóstói Stadion; Attendance: 1,617; Referee: János Takács; Assistant referees: Lajos L. Tóth, Zoltán Szalai; Fourth official: Gábor Bendik

28 April 2009 25	Diósgyőr	1–0	Nyíregyháza	Miskolc
19:00 CEST (UTC+2)	Lippai 23', (yellow card) 77'	Report	Miskolczi (yellow card) 52'	Stadium: Diósgyőri Stadion; Attendance: 6,000; Referee: Tamás Arany; Assistant referees: László Viszokai, István Tóth; Fourth official: J. Zoltán Kovács

3 May 2009 26	Újpest	2–2	Diósgyőr	Budapest
17:30 CEST (UTC+2)	Kéthévoama 55'; Korcsmár (yellow card) 63', (goal) 69'	Report	Mi. Tóth 56'; Honma 67'; Búrány (yellow card) 73'; Višković (yellow card) 82'	Stadium: Szusza Ferenc Stadion; Attendance: 5,617; Referee: Sándor Andó-Szabó; Assistant referees: Vencel Tóth II, Attila Kelemen; Fourth official: László Varga

6 May 2009 17	Kaposvár	1–0	Diósgyőr	Kaposvár
19:00 CEST (UTC+2)	Z. Farkas (yellow card) 27'; Nem. Nikolić 44'; Aílton (yellow card) 80'	Report	B. Lakatos (yellow card) 38'; Bogunović (yellow card) 55'; Miličić (red card) 90'; Szélpál (yellow card) 90'	Stadium: Rákóczi Stadion; Attendance: 1,800; Referee: Ádám Németh; Assistant referees: György Ring, Balázs Farkas; Fourth official: Gergő Janitz
Note: The matches of the 17th round were postponed due to HFF decision.

9 May 2009 27	Diósgyőr	0–1	Siófok	Miskolc
19:00 CEST (UTC+2)	Kamber (yellow card) 33'; Menyhért (yellow card) 63'	Report	L. Nagy (yellow card) 30'; Köntös (yellow card) 55'; Ekounda 80'	Stadium: Diósgyőri Stadion; Attendance: 2,500; Referee: Roland Veizer; Assistant referees: Tibor Vígh, Róbert Horváth; Fourth official: Gábor Bendik

16 May 2009 28	Haladás	1–0	Diósgyőr	Szombathely
19:00 CEST (UTC+2)	Rajos (yellow card) 63'; Oross 88', (yellow card) 88'	Report	B. Lakatos (yellow card) 33'; Miličić (red card) 90+1'	Stadium: Rohonci út Attendance: 6,000; Referee: István Vad; Assistant referees: Balázs Farkas, Roland Schuszter; Fourth official: Balázs Böcskei

22 May 2009 29	Diósgyőr	2–3	Debrecen	Miskolc
19:00 CEST (UTC+2)	Višković (yellow card) 19'; Ahodikpe (yellow card) 40'; Bogunović (yellow card) 58'; Honma 62'; Balajti 80'	Report	Czvitkovics 48', 52'; Vinicius (yellow card) 58'; Dombi 70'	Stadium: Diósgyőri Stadion; Attendance: 3,000; Referee: Péter Solymosi; Assistant referees: Oszkár Lémon, Gábor Takács; Fourth official: László Varga

30 May 2009 30	Kecskemét	2–0	Diósgyőr	Kecskemét
19:00 CEST (UTC+2)	Litsingi 43'; Schindler (yellow card) 71'; Mbengono 80' (pen.)	Report	Kállai (yellow card) 24'; Kamber (yellow card) 43'; Bogunović (red card) 58'	Stadium: Széktói Stadion; Attendance: 5,000; Referee: Ádám Farkas; Assistant referees: Attila Kelemen, Gyula Fehér; Fourth official: László Varga

=== Magyar Kupa ===
3 September 2008 Third round	Nyírtelek	2–5	Diósgyőr	Nyírtelek
15:30 CEST (UTC+2)	L. Simon; Szatmári; Homonyik (red card) 57'; Batári (red card) 82'	Report	Kamber 2x; Stanić, (red card) 63'; V. Szabó; Szélpál	Stadium: Dózsa György utcai Sportpálya; Attendance: 500; Referee: János Guta; Assistant referees: Róbert Horváth, Róbert Tőkés

24 September 2008 Round of 32	Makó	1–0	Diósgyőr	Makó
15:30 CEST (UTC+2)	Maróti 16'; Szamosszegi (yellow card) 39'; Dálnaki (yellow card) 62'; Magyar (yellow card) 83'	Report	Z. Pintér (yellow card) 42'	Stadium: Erdei Ferenc téri Sporttelep; Attendance: 500; Referee: József Berger; Assistant referees: Attila Forgács, János Medovarszki

=== Ligakupa ===
==== Group stage ====
Pos	Team	Pld	W	D	L	GF	GA	GD	Pts	Qualification	VAS	DIO	DEB	NYI	BOC	VAC
1	Vasas	10	6	3	1	31	14	+17	21	Advance to knockout phase	—	3–0	2–1	4–1	1–1	7–1
2	Diósgyőr	10	6	3	1	22	9	+13	21	Advance to knockout phase	2–2	—	4–1	3–1	5–0	4–1
3	Debrecen	10	3	3	4	22	19	+3	12		3–3	0–0	—	2–1	5–1	4–0
4	Nyíregyháza	10	3	2	5	19	18	+1	11		4–0	1–1	2–2	—	4–0	3–0
5	Bőcs	10	3	1	6	15	27	−12	10		1–5	0–1	3–2	2–0	—	5–0
6	Vác-Újbuda	10	3	0	7	13	35	−22	9		0–4	0–2	3–2	4–2	4–2	—

Source: HFF

1 October 2008 1	Diósgyőr	4–1	Debrecen	Miskolc
18:00 CEST (UTC+2)	Tchana 5'; Szélpál 22'; Sz. Horváth 36'; Szabó 66'	Report	Kerekes 29'; Poledica (yellow card) 43'	Stadium: Diósgyőri Stadion; Attendance: 600; Referee: László Varga; Assistant referees: Attila Kelemen, Gyula Fehér

15 October 2008 2	Bőcs	0–1	Diósgyőr	Bőcs
15:00 CEST (UTC+2)	L. Lipták (yellow card) 30'; Kóka (yellow card) 56'	Report	Miličić (yellow card) 15'; Szélpál 56'; Búrány (yellow card) 58'; Kállai (yellow card) 66'; Gohér (yellow card) 89'	Stadium: Szabadság utcai Stadion; Attendance: 500; Referee: Róbert Nagy; Assistant referees: Zoltán Pápai, Tamás Márkus

29 October 2008 3	Nyíregyháza	1–1	Diósgyőr	Nyíregyháza
14:00 CET (UTC+1)	Odrobéna (yellow card) 22'; Apostu (yellow card) 36'; Ambrusz (yellow card) 61'; B. Bakos (yellow card) 74'	Report	P. Takács (yellow card) 37', (goal) 62' (pen.)	Stadium: Városi Stadion; Attendance: 500; Referee: Gábor Oláh; Assistant referees: Balázs Farkas, Zsolt Márton

5 November 2008 4	Diósgyőr	2–2	Vasas	Miskolc
16:00 CET (UTC+1)	V. Sebők 18'; Z. Pintér (yellow card) 23'; Trbović (yellow card) 39'; Tchana (yellow card) 50'; P. Takács 53' (pen.), (yellow card) 61'; Menyhért (yellow card) 90+2'	Report	Gyánó 28'; Kelemen (yellow card) 28', (goal) 42'; Papucsek (yellow card) 71'	Stadium: Diósgyőri Stadion; Attendance: 300; Referee: Gergely Szőts; Assistant referees: Róbert Kispál, István Tóth

12 November 2008 5	Vác-Újbuda	0–2	Diósgyőr	Vác
13:30 CET (UTC+1)		Report	Szélpál (yellow card) 65'; Kamber 70', 73'; Z. Pintér (yellow card) 86'; Bokros (yellow card) 90'	Stadium: Ligeti Stadion; Attendance: 100; Referee: Tibor Gyarmati II; Assistant referees: Róbert Kispál, Vencel Tóth II

22 November 2008 6	Debrecen	0–0	Diósgyőr	Debrecen
13:30 CET (UTC+1)	J. Varga (yellow card) 10'; Z. Takács (yellow card) 52'	Report	Bokros (yellow card) 48'; Menyhért (yellow card) 90+2'	Stadium: Oláh Gábor utcai Stadion; Attendance: 600; Referee: Zoltán Iványi; Assistant referees: János Medovarszki, Tibor Vígh

29 November 2008 7	Diósgyőr	5–0	Bőcs	Miskolc
13:00 CET (UTC+1)	Kamber 18'; Mi. Tóth 27', 29', 70'; Búrány (yellow card) 44'; Miličić (yellow card) 53'; Honma 60'	Report	L. Lipták (yellow card) 63'; Jeney (yellow card) 80'	Stadium: Diósgyőri Stadion; Attendance: 350; Referee: Péter Pető; Assistant referees: László Varga, Gyula Fehér

6 December 2008 8	Diósgyőr	3–1	Nyíregyháza	Miskolc
15:00 CET (UTC+1)	Mi. Tóth 32', 85'; Kamber 48'	Report	Nánási (yellow card) 7'; G. Tóth (yellow card) 51'; Lippai (yellow card) 53'; Goia (red card) 57'; G. Simon 68', (yellow card) 78'; Odrobéna (yellow card) 69'	Stadium: Diósgyőri Stadion; Attendance: 800; Referee: Ádám Farkas; Assistant referees: Tibor Vígh, István Tóth

7 February 2009 9	Vasas	3–0	Diósgyőr	Budapest
12:00 CET (UTC+1)	Divić 57' (pen.); Sowunmi 74'; Papucsek (yellow card) 88'; Dobrić 90'	Report	Stanić (yellow card) 63'; Bokros (yellow card) 66'; Bogunović (yellow card) 67'; Búrány (yellow card) 81'	Stadium: Illovszky Rudolf Stadion; Attendance: 400; Referee: Péter Solymosi; Assistant referees: Oszkár Lémon, Gábor Gyürüsi

14 February 2009 10	Diósgyőr	4–1	Vác-Újbuda	Miskolc
15:00 CET (UTC+1)	Stanić 75'; Kamber 76'; Honma 78'; V. Szabó 82'	Report	Rob (yellow card) 44'; C. Varga 73'; C. Hegedűs (yellow card) 84'	Stadium: Diósgyőri Stadion; Attendance: 1,000; Referee: Eszter Urbán; Assistant referees: Attila Fehér, Gyula Fehér

==== Knockout phase ====
===== Quarter-finals =====
3 March 2009 First leg	Diósgyőr	0–0	Fehérvár	Miskolc
16:30 CET (UTC+1)	Kamber (yellow card) 41'; Szélpál (yellow card) 84'	Report	Pavličić (yellow card) 21'; Sifter (yellow card) 51'; Elek (yellow card) 81'	Stadium: Diósgyőri Stadion; Attendance: 500; Referee: János Takács; Assistant referees: Lajos L. Tóth, Gábor Varga Jr.

25 March 2009 Second leg	Fehérvár	1–0 (1–0 agg.)	Diósgyőr	Székesfehérvár
17:00 CET (UTC+1)	G. Horváth II 71'	Report	Bogunović (yellow card) 35'; V. Szabó (yellow card) 70'	Stadium: Sóstói Stadion; Attendance: 300; Referee: Ádám Németh; Assistant referees: Zoltán Kovács, Balázs Huszár
Note: Fehérvár won 1–0 on aggregate.
