= List of Hungarian football transfers winter 2009–10 =

This is a list of Hungarian football transfers for the 2009–10 winter transfer window by club. Only transfers of clubs in the Soproni Liga and Hungarian National Championship II are included.

The summer transfer window opened on 1 January 2010, although a few transfers may have taken place prior to that date. The window closed at midnight on 20 February 2010. Players without a club may join one at any time, either during or in between transfer windows.

== Soproni Liga ==
=== Budapest Honvéd FC ===
In: Note: Flags indicate national team as defined under FIFA eligibility rules; some limited exceptions apply. Players may hold more than one non-FIFA nationality.

No.	Pos.	Nation	Player
5	MF	UKR	Pavlo Yanchuk (from (Romania) FC Dinamo II București)
15	DF	CIV	Jean-Baptiste Akassou (from (Thailand) BEC Tero Sasana)
21	MF	HUN	Gergő Gohér (on loan from (Hungary) Diósgyőri VTK)
22	DF	FRA	Gary Tavars (from (Czech Republic) FK Baník Most)
23	FW	GER	Angelo Vaccaro (from (Germany) Eintracht Frankfurt II)
28	MF	ESP	Pablo Coira (from (Spain) RCD Espanyol B)
32	MF	HUN	Attila Szili (from (Cyprus) Atromitos Yeroskipou)
TBA	FW	HUN	Dávid Kleiber (on loan from (Hungary) Diósgyőri VTK)
TBA	DF	ESP	Fernando Cuerda (from (Greece) Kavala FC)

Out: Note: Flags indicate national team as defined under FIFA eligibility rules; some limited exceptions apply. Players may hold more than one non-FIFA nationality.

No.	Pos.	Nation	Player
2	DF	HUN	Géza Fazakas (on loan to (Hungary) BKV Előre SC)
5	DF	CIV	Benjamin Angoua (to (France) Valenciennes FC)
13	FW	HUN	Ádám Hrepka (loan return to (Hungary) MTK Budapest FC)
16	DF	SVK	Milan Pastva (released)
21	MF	HUN	Zoltán Tóth (released)

=== Debreceni VSC ===
In: Note: Flags indicate national team as defined under FIFA eligibility rules; some limited exceptions apply. Players may hold more than one non-FIFA nationality.

No.	Pos.	Nation	Player
11	FW	HUN	Milán Faggyas (loan return from (Hungary) Diósgyőri VTK)
20	MF	CMR	Mbengono Yannick (from (Hungary) Kecskeméti TE)
23	FW	HUN	Péter Szilágyi (loan return from (Hungary) Vasas SC)
40	FW	CMR	Etogo Essama (from (Italy) US Sestese Calcio)
60	MF	SVK	Károly Czanik (loan return from (Hungary) Nyíregyháza Spartacus)
83	MF	HUN	Zoltán Varga (loan return from (Hungary) Rákospalotai EAC)
—	MF	HUN	Róbert Nagy (loan return from (Hungary) Diósgyőri VTK)
—	MF	HUN	Tamás Szélpál (loan return from (Hungary) Nyíregyháza Spartacus)

Out: Note: Flags indicate national team as defined under FIFA eligibility rules; some limited exceptions apply. Players may hold more than one non-FIFA nationality.

No.	Pos.	Nation	Player
2	DF	HUN	István Szűcs (loan to (Hungary) Kecskeméti TE)
4	DF	HUN	Leandro de Almeida (to (Cyprus) AC Omonia)
8	FW	HUN	Zsombor Kerekes (to (Hungary) Báránd KSE)
41	FW	HUN	Lóránt Oláh (to (Hungary) Kaposvári Rákóczi FC)
57	DF	BRA	Hugo Nascimento (released)
60	MF	SVK	Károly Czanik (loan return to (Hungary) Szolnoki MÁV FC)
83	MF	HUN	Zoltán Varga (to (Hungary) Pécsi Mecsek FC)
99	FW	NGR	Dudu Omagbemi (to (Hungary) Kecskeméti TE)
—	MF	HUN	Tamás Szélpál (loan to (Hungary) Szolnoki MÁV FC)

=== Diósgyőri VTK ===
In: Note: Flags indicate national team as defined under FIFA eligibility rules; some limited exceptions apply. Players may hold more than one non-FIFA nationality.

No.	Pos.	Nation	Player
1	GK	CRO	Ivan Radoš (from NK Croatia Sesvete)
4	MF	ENG	Rohan Ricketts (from (Canada) Toronto FC)
5	DF	CRO	Igor Gal (from (Croatia) NK Slaven Belupo)
7	DF	HUN	Bence Zámbó (on loan from (Hungary) Győri ETO FC)
8	MF	HUN	Tamás Huszák (on loan from (Hungary) Debreceni VSC)
9	FW	HUN	Robert Roszel (from (Romania) FC Baia Mare)
11	FW	MNE	Bojan Brnovic (on loan from (Hungary) Győri ETO FC)
14	MF	HUN	Tamás Burányi (from (Hungary) Zalaegerszegi TE)
17	DF	CMR	Haman Sadjo (from (Cameroon) Sahel FC)
21	FW	CMR	George Menougong (on loan from (Hungary) Bőcs KSC)
22	FW	HUN	Péter Bajzát (on loan from (Hungary) Győri ETO FC)
26	DF	BIH	Zoran Šupić (on loan from (Hungary) Győri ETO FC)
27	GK	LTU	Mindaugas Malinauskas (from (Latvia) Tranzīts Ventspils)
28	MF	HUN	Tamás Somorjai (from (Austria) TSV Hartberg)
99	MF	HUN	Attila Dobos (from (Hungary) Rákospalotai EAC)

Out: Note: Flags indicate national team as defined under FIFA eligibility rules; some limited exceptions apply. Players may hold more than one non-FIFA nationality.

No.	Pos.	Nation	Player
2	DF	HUN	Norbert Kállai (on loan to (Hungary) Hévíz FC)
3	DF	SRB	Boris Miličić (to (Serbia) FK Javor)
6	DF	HUN	Gergő Menyhért (on loan to (Hungary) Kaposvölgye)
9	DF	HUN	Gergő Gohér (on loan to (Hungary) Budapest Honvéd)
11	FW	HUN	Milán Faggyas (loan return to (Hungary) Debrecen)
12	DF	SRB	Despot Visković (to (China) Hohhot Black Horse)
17	DF	HUN	Tibor Bokros (on loan to (Hungary) Bőcs KSC)
19	MF	HUN	Norbert Lipusz (on loan to (Hungary) Kazincbarcikai SC)
20	MF	HUN	Gellért Ivancsics (on loan to (Hungary) Szigetszentmiklósi TK)
22	GK	HUN	Bence Somodi (to (Hungary) Kazincbarcikai SC)
22	DF	SRB	Nemanja Bulatović (released)
24	FW	HUN	Dávid Kleiber (on loan to (Hungary) Budapest Honvéd)
24	GK	GEO	Besarion Kodalaev (to (Georgia (country)) Spartaki Tbilisi)
29	GK	HUN	Zoltán Kovács (loan return to (Hungary) Kaposvár)
33	FW	HUN	Viktor Szabó (to (Hungary) Mezőkövesdi SE)
41	MF	HUN	Szabolcs Horváth (on loan to (Hungary) Vecsési FC)
82	FW	ROU	Bogdan Apostu (to (Romania) Cureta de Argeş)
—	DF	ROU	László Balint (released)

=== Ferencvárosi TC ===
In: Note: Flags indicate national team as defined under FIFA eligibility rules; some limited exceptions apply. Players may hold more than one non-FIFA nationality.

No.	Pos.	Nation	Player
9	FW	ENG	Anthony Elding (from (England) Crewe Alexandra)
14	MF	NIR	Tommy Doherty (from (England) Wycombe Wanderers)
15	DF	SRB	Đorđe Tutorić (from (Serbia) Red Star Belgrade)
23	GK	MLT	Justin Haber (from (England) Sheffield United)
27	MF	MLT	André Schembri (from SK Austria Kärnten)
32	MF	ENG	Sam Stockley (from (England) Port Vale)
85	DF	HUN	Csaba Csizmadia (from (Croatia) NK Slaven Belupo)

Out: Note: Flags indicate national team as defined under FIFA eligibility rules; some limited exceptions apply. Players may hold more than one non-FIFA nationality.

No.	Pos.	Nation	Player
8	MF	ENG	James Ashmore (released)
14	DF	ENG	Matthew Lowton (loan return to (England) Sheffield United)
15	DF	ENG	Cory Sinnott (released)
16	GK	HUN	Ádám Holczer (to (Hungary) Kecskeméti TE)
17	MF	ENG	Sam Wedgbury (loan return to (England) Sheffield United)
21	MF	HUN	Norbert Zsivóczky (to (Hungary) Diósgyőri VTK)
28	FW	HUN	István Kovács (on loan to (Hungary) Ceglédi VSE)
29	DF	HUN	Noel Fülöp (on loan to (Hungary) Szigetszentmiklósi TK)
36	FW	CAN	Igor Pisanjuk (on loan to (Hungary) Szolnoki MÁV FC)
60	FW	HUN	Péter Pölöskey (on loan to (Hungary) Rákospalotai EAC)
82	DF	HUN	Zoltán Csiszár (to (Hungary) Békéscsabai Előre FC)

=== Győri ETO FC ===
In: Note: Flags indicate national team as defined under FIFA eligibility rules; some limited exceptions apply. Players may hold more than one non-FIFA nationality.

No.	Pos.	Nation	Player
7	MF	BIH	Eldin Adilović (from (Azerbaijan) FK Mughan)
11	FW	BRA	Nicolas Ceolin (from (Belarus) FC Neman Grodno)
14	FW	GEO	Vakhtang Pantskhava (from (France) Le Mans UC B)
18	MF	MKD	Gjorgji Mojsov (from (Romania) FC Oţelul Galaţi)
32	MF	MAR	Chemcedine El Araichi (from (Belgium) R.E. Mouscron)
—	MF	BEL	Jonathan Walasiak (from (Belgium) R.E. Mouscron)

Out: Note: Flags indicate national team as defined under FIFA eligibility rules; some limited exceptions apply. Players may hold more than one non-FIFA nationality.

No.	Pos.	Nation	Player
3	DF	HUN	Zoltán Kovács (on loan to (Hungary) Rákospalotai EAC)
11	FW	MNE	Bojan Brnović (on loan to (Hungary) Diósgyőri VTK)
14	DF	HUN	Dániel Völgyi (on loan to (Hungary) Paksi SE)
15	DF	HUN	Bence Zámbó (on loan to (Hungary) Diósgyőri VTK)
19	FW	HUN	Péter Bajzát (on loan to (Hungary) Diósgyőri VTK)
26	DF	BIH	Zoran Šupić (on loan to (Hungary) Diósgyőri VTK)
—	MF	BEL	Jonathan Walasiak (released)

=== Kaposvári Rákóczi FC ===
In: Note: Flags indicate national team as defined under FIFA eligibility rules; some limited exceptions apply. Players may hold more than one non-FIFA nationality.

No.	Pos.	Nation	Player
1	GK	HUN	Zoltán Kovács (loan return from (Hungary) Diósgyőri VTK)
3	DF	ITA	Gabriele Fabris (from (Italy) Treviso Calcio)
9	FW	NGR	Egejuru Godslove (from (Hungary) Kaposvölgye VSC)
14	FW	HUN	Lóránt Oláh (from (Hungary) Debreceni VSC)
15	MF	SRB	Dragan Antanasijević (from (Serbia) FK BASK Beograd)
—	FW	BIH	Daniel Culum (from (Bosnia and Herzegovina) FK Drina Zvornik)

Out: Note: Flags indicate national team as defined under FIFA eligibility rules; some limited exceptions apply. Players may hold more than one non-FIFA nationality.

No.	Pos.	Nation	Player
2	FW	HUN	Zoltán Jovánczai (to (Hungary) Lombard-Pápa TFC)
3	DF	HUN	László Pintér (on loan to (Hungary) Kaposvölgye VSC)
9	FW	HUN	Krisztián Farkas (to (Hungary) Szolnoki MÁV FC)
10	FW	SRB	Nemanja Nikolić (to (Hungary) Videoton FCF)
—	FW	MNE	Igor Lambulić (released)
—	MF	HUN	Dávid Hegedűs (to (Hungary) Hevesi SC)
—	DF	HUN	István Kerekes (on loan to (Hungary) Kaposvölgye VSC)
—	DF	SRB	Slobodan Marković (to (Hungary) Hévíz FC)
—	GK	HUN	Pál Tarczy (to (Hungary) BKV Előre SC)

=== Kecskeméti TE ===
In: Note: Flags indicate national team as defined under FIFA eligibility rules; some limited exceptions apply. Players may hold more than one non-FIFA nationality.

No.	Pos.	Nation	Player
1	GK	HUN	Ádám Holczer (from (Hungary) Ferencvárosi TC)
4	DF	HUN	István Szűcs (on loan from (Hungary) Debreceni VSC)
6	DF	BIH	Dalio Memić (from (Germany) 1. FC Nürnberg II)
9	FW	NGR	Dudu (from (Hungary) Debreceni VSC)
14	DF	SRB	Vladan Čukić (loan return from (Hungary) Mezőkövesd SE)
16	DF	SLO	Ales Kokot (from (Slovenia) Interblock Ljubljana)
19	DF	MNE	Mladen Lambulić (from (Hungary) Újpest FC)
19	FW	HUN	László Kormos (loan return from (Hungary) Szolnoki MÁV FC)
20	MF	HUN	Péter Vörös (from (Uzbekistan) Lokomotiv Tashkent)
21	MF	HUN	Gábor Bori (on loan from (Hungary) MTK Budapest FC)

Out: Note: Flags indicate national team as defined under FIFA eligibility rules; some limited exceptions apply. Players may hold more than one non-FIFA nationality.

No.	Pos.	Nation	Player
4	DF	SLO	Milan Rakič (to (Serbia) FK Smederevo)
9	FW	HUN	Marcell Balog (on loan to (Hungary) Szolnoki MÁV FC)
19	FW	HUN	László Kormos (on loan to (Hungary) Vecsés FC)
19	MF	CRO	Goran Perak (to (Bosnia and Herzegovina) FK Željezničar Sarajevo)
20	MF	HUN	Attila Menyhárt (on loan to (Hungary) Vecsés FC)
25	GK	MNE	Pavle Velimirović (released)
27	FW	CMR	Mbengono Yannick (to (Hungary) Debreceni VSC)
30	GK	BIH	Romeo Mitrović (released)
32	DF	MNE	Vladan Peličić (released)

=== Lombard-Pápa TFC ===
In: Note: Flags indicate national team as defined under FIFA eligibility rules; some limited exceptions apply. Players may hold more than one non-FIFA nationality.

No.	Pos.	Nation	Player
10	MF	NGR	David Solomon Abwo (from (France) US Créteil)
12	FW	HUN	Zoltán Jovánczai (from (Hungary) Kaposvári Rákóczi)
30	DF	COL	César Quintero (from (Colombia) Independiente Medellín)
TBA	MF	HUN	Gergely Fűzfa (from (Hungary) Újpest FC)

Out: Note: Flags indicate national team as defined under FIFA eligibility rules; some limited exceptions apply. Players may hold more than one non-FIFA nationality.

No.	Pos.	Nation	Player
10	FW	BRA	Alex José De Paula (to (Hungary) Szolnoki MÁV FC)
11	FW	HUN	Tamás Ferenc Béres (released)

=== MTK Budapest FC ===
In: Note: Flags indicate national team as defined under FIFA eligibility rules; some limited exceptions apply. Players may hold more than one non-FIFA nationality.

No.	Pos.	Nation	Player
10	MF	HUN	János Lázok (on loan from (Hungary) Vasas SC)
20	GK	SRB	Nenad Filipovic (on loan from (Hungary) Videoton FC)
33	GK	HUN	Viktor Szentpéteri (from (Finland) FC Lahti)
77	FW	HUN	Tamás Kulcsár (on loan from (Poland) Polonia Warsaw)

Out: Note: Flags indicate national team as defined under FIFA eligibility rules; some limited exceptions apply. Players may hold more than one non-FIFA nationality.

No.	Pos.	Nation	Player
12	FW	HUN	László Lencse (to (Hungary) Videoton FC)
13	FW	HUN	Ádám Hrepka (on loan to (Hungary) Vasas SC)
21	MF	HUN	Gábor Bori (on loan to (Hungary) Kecskeméti TE)
30	FW	HUN	András Gosztonyi (to (Italy) A.S. Bari)
—	GK	HUN	Milán Balikó (on loan to (Hungary) Szigetszentmiklós)
—	GK	HUN	Szabolcs Kemenes (released)

=== Nyíregyháza Spartacus ===
In: Note: Flags indicate national team as defined under FIFA eligibility rules; some limited exceptions apply. Players may hold more than one non-FIFA nationality.

No.	Pos.	Nation	Player
—	DF	SRB	Predrag Bosnjak (from (Serbia) FK Novi Sad)

Out: Note: Flags indicate national team as defined under FIFA eligibility rules; some limited exceptions apply. Players may hold more than one non-FIFA nationality.

No.	Pos.	Nation	Player

=== Paksi SE ===
In: Note: Flags indicate national team as defined under FIFA eligibility rules; some limited exceptions apply. Players may hold more than one non-FIFA nationality.

No.	Pos.	Nation	Player

Out: Note: Flags indicate national team as defined under FIFA eligibility rules; some limited exceptions apply. Players may hold more than one non-FIFA nationality.

No.	Pos.	Nation	Player

=== Szombathelyi Haladás ===
In: Note: Flags indicate national team as defined under FIFA eligibility rules; some limited exceptions apply. Players may hold more than one non-FIFA nationality.

No.	Pos.	Nation	Player
13	MF	HUN	Péter Halmosi (on loan from (England) Hull City A.F.C.)
18	MF	HUN	Norbert Sipos (from (Cyprus) Nea Salamis Famagusta)
21	MF	SEN	El Hadji Diouf (on loan from (Greece) AEK Athens F.C.)
27	DF	FRA	Jean-Baptiste Paternotte (from (Belgium) A.F.C. Tubize)
55	FW	SRB	Igor Bogdanović (from (Hungary) Nyíregyháza Spartacus)

Out: Note: Flags indicate national team as defined under FIFA eligibility rules; some limited exceptions apply. Players may hold more than one non-FIFA nationality.

No.	Pos.	Nation	Player
5	MF	BRA	Maikel (to (Portugal) C.D. Feirense)
—	FW	LBR	Victor Pony Carr (to (Israel) Maccabi Herzliya)

=== Újpest FC ===
In: Note: Flags indicate national team as defined under FIFA eligibility rules; some limited exceptions apply. Players may hold more than one non-FIFA nationality.

No.	Pos.	Nation	Player

Out: Note: Flags indicate national team as defined under FIFA eligibility rules; some limited exceptions apply. Players may hold more than one non-FIFA nationality.

No.	Pos.	Nation	Player

=== Vasas SC ===
In: Note: Flags indicate national team as defined under FIFA eligibility rules; some limited exceptions apply. Players may hold more than one non-FIFA nationality.

No.	Pos.	Nation	Player

Out: Note: Flags indicate national team as defined under FIFA eligibility rules; some limited exceptions apply. Players may hold more than one non-FIFA nationality.

No.	Pos.	Nation	Player

=== Videoton FC ===
In: Note: Flags indicate national team as defined under FIFA eligibility rules; some limited exceptions apply. Players may hold more than one non-FIFA nationality.

No.	Pos.	Nation	Player

Out: Note: Flags indicate national team as defined under FIFA eligibility rules; some limited exceptions apply. Players may hold more than one non-FIFA nationality.

No.	Pos.	Nation	Player

=== Zalaegerszegi TE ===
In: Note: Flags indicate national team as defined under FIFA eligibility rules; some limited exceptions apply. Players may hold more than one non-FIFA nationality.

No.	Pos.	Nation	Player

Out: Note: Flags indicate national team as defined under FIFA eligibility rules; some limited exceptions apply. Players may hold more than one non-FIFA nationality.

No.	Pos.	Nation	Player

== See also ==
- (Belgium) List of Belgian football transfers winter 2009–10
- (Denmark) List of Danish football transfers winter 2009–10
- (England) List of English football transfers winter 2009–10
- (France) List of French football transfers winter 2010
- (Germany) List of German football transfers winter 2009–10
- (Italy) List of Italian football transfers winter 2009–10
- (Latvia) List of Latvian football transfers winter 2009–10
- (Malta) List of Maltese football transfers winter 2009–10
- (Serbia) List of Serbian football transfers winter 2009–10
- (Spain) List of Spanish football transfers winter 2009–10
- (Sweden) List of Swedish football transfers winter 2009–2010
