= Trbović =

Trbović is a surname. The Croatian census of 2011 listed it as one of the most common surnames in Vrbovsko.

Notable people with the surname include:

- Nenad Trbović, a Serbian politician
- Dane Trbović, a Serbian footballer
