= Köteles =

Köteles is a surname. Notable people with the name include:

- Erzsébet Gulyás-Köteles (1924–2019), Hungarian gymnast
- László Köteles (born 1984), Hungarian footballer
