= List of Maltese football transfers winter 2009–10 =

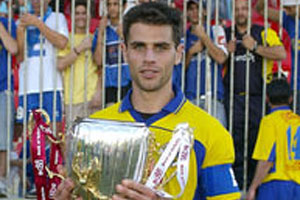
Carlo Mamo joined Birkirkara on loan for the remainder of the season from Marsaxlokk.

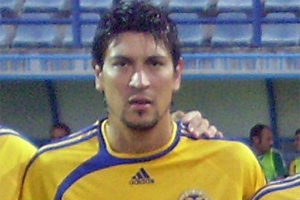
Julio Alcorsé returned to Malta to join Sliema Wanderers.

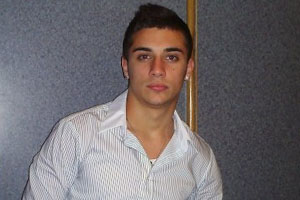
Leighton Grech joined Marsaxlokk on loan from Hibernians.

This is a list of Maltese football transfers for the 2009–10 winter transfer window by club. Only transfers of clubs in the Maltese Premier League and Maltese First Division are included.

The summer transfer window opened on 1 January 2010, although a few transfers may take place prior to that date. The window closed at midnight on 31 January 2010. Players without a club may join one at any time, either during or in between transfer windows.

== Maltese Premier League ==
=== Birkirkara ===
In: Note: Flags indicate national team as defined under FIFA eligibility rules; some limited exceptions apply. Players may hold more than one non-FIFA nationality.

No.	Pos.	Nation	Player
3	DF	(Malta) MLT	Carlo Mamo (on loan from Marsaxlokk)

Out: Note: Flags indicate national team as defined under FIFA eligibility rules; some limited exceptions apply. Players may hold more than one non-FIFA nationality.

No.	Pos.	Nation	Player
15	MF	(Malta) MLT	Jonathan Holland (from Ħamrun Spartans)

=== Dingli Swallows ===
In: Note: Flags indicate national team as defined under FIFA eligibility rules; some limited exceptions apply. Players may hold more than one non-FIFA nationality.

No.	Pos.	Nation	Player

Out: Note: Flags indicate national team as defined under FIFA eligibility rules; some limited exceptions apply. Players may hold more than one non-FIFA nationality.

No.	Pos.	Nation	Player

=== Floriana ===
In: Note: Flags indicate national team as defined under FIFA eligibility rules; some limited exceptions apply. Players may hold more than one non-FIFA nationality.

No.	Pos.	Nation	Player
—	GK	(Sweden) SWE	Goran Jovanovic (from free agent)
15	DF	(Malta) MLT	Stefano Grima (from Msida Saint-Joseph)
2	DF	(Malta) MLT	Brian Said (from Marsaxlokk)
21	MF	(Serbia) SRB	Stefan Lijeskić (from (Serbia) FK Sevojno)
9	FW	(Russia) RUS	Victor Zlydarev (from (Russia) FC Volga-d Ulyanovsk)

Out: Note: Flags indicate national team as defined under FIFA eligibility rules; some limited exceptions apply. Players may hold more than one non-FIFA nationality.

No.	Pos.	Nation	Player
—	GK	(Sweden) SWE	Goran Jovanovic (released)
16	DF	(Malta) MLT	Duncan Pisani (on loan to Qormi)
—	FW	(Malta) MLT	Nicolo Baldacchino Orland (to Melita)
9	FW	(England) ENG	Donovan Simmonds (to (Scotland) Greenock Morton)
11	FW	(Nigeria) NGA	Akanni-Sunday Wasiu (to (Republic of Ireland) Cork City)

=== Ħamrun Spartans ===
In: Note: Flags indicate national team as defined under FIFA eligibility rules; some limited exceptions apply. Players may hold more than one non-FIFA nationality.

No.	Pos.	Nation	Player
23	DF	(Czech Republic) CZE	Martin Hrubsa (from Vittoriosa Stars)
78	MF	(Malta) MLT	Jonathan Holland (from Birkirkara)
28	FW	(Angola) ANG	João Mawete (from (Cyprus) Chalkanoras Idaliou)
90	FW	(Malta) MLT	Ian Zammit (on loan from Valletta)

Out: Note: Flags indicate national team as defined under FIFA eligibility rules; some limited exceptions apply. Players may hold more than one non-FIFA nationality.

No.	Pos.	Nation	Player
13	DF	(Malta) MLT	John Debattista (on loan to Mqabba)

=== Hibernians ===
In: Note: Flags indicate national team as defined under FIFA eligibility rules; some limited exceptions apply. Players may hold more than one non-FIFA nationality.

No.	Pos.	Nation	Player
7	MF	Gozo	Chris Camilleri (on loan from (Gozo) Xewkija Tigers)
11	FW	(Portugal) POR	Miguel Nimes Lopes De Pina (from (Cyprus) Othellos Athienou)
11	FW	(Latvia) LVA	Oļegs Malašenoks (on loan from (Latvia) FK Ventspils)
22	FW	(Brazil) BRA	Elton Morelato (from (South Africa) Moroka Swallows)

Out: Note: Flags indicate national team as defined under FIFA eligibility rules; some limited exceptions apply. Players may hold more than one non-FIFA nationality.

No.	Pos.	Nation	Player
22	MF	(Bulgaria) BUL	Rumen Galabov (to Marsaxlokk)
7	MF	(Australia) AUS	Leighton Grech (on loan to Marsaxlokk)
11	FW	(Latvia) LVA	Oļegs Malašenoks (loan return to (Latvia) FK Ventspils)

=== Msida Saint-Joseph ===
In: Note: Flags indicate national team as defined under FIFA eligibility rules; some limited exceptions apply. Players may hold more than one non-FIFA nationality.

No.	Pos.	Nation	Player
13	MF	(Nigeria) NGA	Julius Emanche (loan return from (Gozo) Victoria Hotspurs)
18	FW	(Malta) MLT	Miguel Ciantar (on loan from Sliema Wanderers)
21	FW	(Costa Rica) CRC	Windell Gabriels (from (Costa Rica) L.D. Alajuelense)
19	FW	(Democratic Republic of the Congo) COD	N'Dayi Kalenga (from (Gozo) Għajnsielem)

Out: Note: Flags indicate national team as defined under FIFA eligibility rules; some limited exceptions apply. Players may hold more than one non-FIFA nationality.

No.	Pos.	Nation	Player
4	DF	(Malta) MLT	Stefano Grima (to Floriana)
—	MF	(Malta) MLT	Andrew Spiteri (to Marsaxlokk)

=== Qormi ===
In: Note: Flags indicate national team as defined under FIFA eligibility rules; some limited exceptions apply. Players may hold more than one non-FIFA nationality.

No.	Pos.	Nation	Player
2	DF	(Malta) MLT	Duncan Pisani (on loan from Floriana)
7	MF	(Malta) MLT	Matthew Bartolo (on loan from Sliema Wanderers)
26	MF	(Malta) MLT	Stefan Giglio (on loan from Valletta)

Out: Note: Flags indicate national team as defined under FIFA eligibility rules; some limited exceptions apply. Players may hold more than one non-FIFA nationality.

No.	Pos.	Nation	Player
29	DF	(Malta) MLT	Sharlon Pace (to Pietà Hotspurs)
80	MF	(Malta) MLT	Joseph Chetcuti (on loan to Vittoriosa Stars)

=== Sliema Wanderers ===
In: Note: Flags indicate national team as defined under FIFA eligibility rules; some limited exceptions apply. Players may hold more than one non-FIFA nationality.

No.	Pos.	Nation	Player
20	FW	(Argentina) ARG	Julio Alcorsé (from (Paraguay) Guaraní)
22	FW	(Brazil) BRA	Pedrinho (from (Israel) Hapoel Ironi Rishon LeZion)

Out: Note: Flags indicate national team as defined under FIFA eligibility rules; some limited exceptions apply. Players may hold more than one non-FIFA nationality.

No.	Pos.	Nation	Player
25	GK	(Brazil) BRA	Michael Lima (released)
11	MF	(Malta) MLT	Matthew Bartolo (on loan to Qormi)
10	FW	(Malta) MLT	Miguel Ciantar (on loan to Msida Saint-Joseph)
20	FW	(Germany) GER	Henry Isaac (released)

=== Tarxien Rainbows ===
In: Note: Flags indicate national team as defined under FIFA eligibility rules; some limited exceptions apply. Players may hold more than one non-FIFA nationality.

No.	Pos.	Nation	Player
87	DF	(Malta) MLT	Justin Grioli (on loan from Valletta)

Out: Note: Flags indicate national team as defined under FIFA eligibility rules; some limited exceptions apply. Players may hold more than one non-FIFA nationality.

No.	Pos.	Nation	Player

=== Valletta ===
In: Note: Flags indicate national team as defined under FIFA eligibility rules; some limited exceptions apply. Players may hold more than one non-FIFA nationality.

No.	Pos.	Nation	Player
16	FW	(Ireland) EIR	Declan O'Brien (from (Republic of Ireland) St Patrick's Athletic)

Out: Note: Flags indicate national team as defined under FIFA eligibility rules; some limited exceptions apply. Players may hold more than one non-FIFA nationality.

No.	Pos.	Nation	Player
2	DF	(Malta) MLT	Justin Grioli (on loan to Tarxien Rainbows)
26	MF	(Malta) MLT	Stefan Giglio (on loan to Qormi)
16	FW	(Netherlands) NED	Geert den Ouden (released)
9	FW	(Malta) MLT	Ian Zammit (on loan to Ħamrun Spartans)

== Maltese First Division ==
=== Balzan Youths ===
In: Note: Flags indicate national team as defined under FIFA eligibility rules; some limited exceptions apply. Players may hold more than one non-FIFA nationality.

No.	Pos.	Nation	Player
—	MF	(Malta) MLT	Silvan Ciscaldi (from Pietà Hotspurs)

Out: Note: Flags indicate national team as defined under FIFA eligibility rules; some limited exceptions apply. Players may hold more than one non-FIFA nationality.

No.	Pos.	Nation	Player
—	DF	(Malta) MLT	David Carabott (to Marsaxlokk)

=== Marsaxlokk ===
In: Note: Flags indicate national team as defined under FIFA eligibility rules; some limited exceptions apply. Players may hold more than one non-FIFA nationality.

No.	Pos.	Nation	Player
5	DF	(Malta) MLT	David Carabott (from Balzan Youths)
17	MF	(Bulgaria) BUL	Rumen Galabov (from Hibernians)
10	MF	(Australia) AUS	Leighton Grech (on loan from Hibernians)
—	MF	(Malta) MLT	Andrew Spiteri (from Msida Saint-Joseph)
—	FW	(Latvia) LVA	Maksims Daņilovs (from (Latvia) FC Dinaburg)

Out: Note: Flags indicate national team as defined under FIFA eligibility rules; some limited exceptions apply. Players may hold more than one non-FIFA nationality.

No.	Pos.	Nation	Player
3	DF	(Malta) MLT	Carlo Mamo (on loan to Birkirkara)
6	DF	(Malta) MLT	Brian Said (to Floriana)
10	MF	Gozo	Chris Camilleri (to (Gozo) Xewkija Tigers)
—	FW	(Latvia) LVA	Maksims Daņilovs (released)

=== Melita ===
In: Note: Flags indicate national team as defined under FIFA eligibility rules; some limited exceptions apply. Players may hold more than one non-FIFA nationality.

No.	Pos.	Nation	Player
—	FW	(Malta) MLT	Nicolo Baldacchino Orland (from Floriana)

Out: Note: Flags indicate national team as defined under FIFA eligibility rules; some limited exceptions apply. Players may hold more than one non-FIFA nationality.

No.	Pos.	Nation	Player

=== Mosta ===
In: Note: Flags indicate national team as defined under FIFA eligibility rules; some limited exceptions apply. Players may hold more than one non-FIFA nationality.

No.	Pos.	Nation	Player
20	DF	(Jamaica) JAM	Nathan Koo-Boothe (from (Jamaica) Portmore United)
16	MF	(England) ENG	Mark Briggs (from (United States) Wilmington Hammerheads)
—	FW	(England) ENG	Victor Osobu (from (England) Windsor & Eton)

Out: Note: Flags indicate national team as defined under FIFA eligibility rules; some limited exceptions apply. Players may hold more than one non-FIFA nationality.

No.	Pos.	Nation	Player
20	DF	(Jamaica) JAM	Nathan Koo-Boothe (released)

=== Mqabba ===
In: Note: Flags indicate national team as defined under FIFA eligibility rules; some limited exceptions apply. Players may hold more than one non-FIFA nationality.

No.	Pos.	Nation	Player
18	DF	(Malta) MLT	John Debattista (on loan from Ħamrun Spartans)

Out: Note: Flags indicate national team as defined under FIFA eligibility rules; some limited exceptions apply. Players may hold more than one non-FIFA nationality.

No.	Pos.	Nation	Player

=== Pietà Hotspurs ===
In: Note: Flags indicate national team as defined under FIFA eligibility rules; some limited exceptions apply. Players may hold more than one non-FIFA nationality.

No.	Pos.	Nation	Player
—	DF	(Malta) MLT	Sharlon Pace (from Qormi)
—	MF	(England) ENG	Benjamin Perry-Acton (from Unknown)
—	FW	(England) ENG	Olalekan Alabi (from Unknown)

Out: Note: Flags indicate national team as defined under FIFA eligibility rules; some limited exceptions apply. Players may hold more than one non-FIFA nationality.

No.	Pos.	Nation	Player
—	MF	(Malta) MLT	Silvan Ciscaldi (to Balzan Youths)

=== San Gwann ===
In: Note: Flags indicate national team as defined under FIFA eligibility rules; some limited exceptions apply. Players may hold more than one non-FIFA nationality.

No.	Pos.	Nation	Player

Out: Note: Flags indicate national team as defined under FIFA eligibility rules; some limited exceptions apply. Players may hold more than one non-FIFA nationality.

No.	Pos.	Nation	Player

=== St. George's ===
In: Note: Flags indicate national team as defined under FIFA eligibility rules; some limited exceptions apply. Players may hold more than one non-FIFA nationality.

No.	Pos.	Nation	Player

Out: Note: Flags indicate national team as defined under FIFA eligibility rules; some limited exceptions apply. Players may hold more than one non-FIFA nationality.

No.	Pos.	Nation	Player

=== St. Patrick ===
In: Note: Flags indicate national team as defined under FIFA eligibility rules; some limited exceptions apply. Players may hold more than one non-FIFA nationality.

No.	Pos.	Nation	Player

Out: Note: Flags indicate national team as defined under FIFA eligibility rules; some limited exceptions apply. Players may hold more than one non-FIFA nationality.

No.	Pos.	Nation	Player

=== Vittoriosa Stars ===
In: Note: Flags indicate national team as defined under FIFA eligibility rules; some limited exceptions apply. Players may hold more than one non-FIFA nationality.

No.	Pos.	Nation	Player
—	MF	(Malta) MLT	Joseph Chetcuti (on loan from Qormi)
33	MF	(Romania) ROU	Leontin Chitescu (from (Indonesia) Arema Malang)
15	FW	(Nigeria) NGA	Henry Makinwa (from (Indonesia) PSMS Medan)

Out: Note: Flags indicate national team as defined under FIFA eligibility rules; some limited exceptions apply. Players may hold more than one non-FIFA nationality.

No.	Pos.	Nation	Player
19	DF	(Czech Republic) CZE	Martin Hrubsa (to Ħamrun Spartans)

== Manager Transfers ==
Name	Moving from	Moving to	Source
(Republic of Ireland) Roddy Collins	Floriana	(Republic of Ireland) Cork City	
(Serbia) Zoran Popovic	unattached	Floriana	
(Malta) Mark Marlow	Msida Saint-Joseph	resigned	
(Malta) Keith Gouder	Msida Saint-Joseph assistant	Msida Saint-Joseph	
(Malta) Stephen Azzopardi	Sliema Wanderers	sacked	
(Malta) Mark Marlow	unattached	Sliema Wanderers	
(Bulgaria) Borislav Giorev	Mqabba	sacked	
(Malta) Clive Mizzi	Marsaxlokk assistant	Mqabba	

== See also ==
- (Belgium) List of Belgian football transfers winter 2009–10
- (Denmark) List of Danish football transfers winter 2009–10
- (England) List of English football transfers winter 2009–10
- (France) List of French football transfers winter 2010
- (Germany) List of German football transfers winter 2009–10
- (Hungary) List of Hungarian football transfers winter 2009–2010
- (Italy) List of Italian football transfers winter 2009–10
- (Spain) List of Spanish football transfers winter 2009–10
- (Sweden) List of Swedish football transfers winter 2009–2010
