= Nenad Trbović =

Serbian politician

Nenad Trbović (Serbian Cyrillic: Ненад Трбовић; born 1967) is a politician in Serbia. He served in the Assembly of Vojvodina from 2016 to 2020 and is now a member of the Kula municipal assembly. Formerly with the Serbian Renewal Movement (Srpski pokret obnove, SPO), Trbović is now a member of the Movement for the Restoration of the Kingdom of Serbia (Pokret obnove Kraljevine Srbije, POKS).

== Private career ==
Trbović is a mechanical technician. He lives in Crvenka in the Kula municipality.

== Politician ==
The SPO contested the 2012 Vojvodina provincial election in an alliance with the Liberal Democratic Party (Liberalno demokratska partija, LDP) and other parties, known as Preokret (English: U-Turn). Trbović received the fifty-first position on the alliance's electoral list, which failed to cross the threshold to win any mandates in the assembly. He also appeared on the alliance's list for the Kula municipal assembly in the concurrent 2012 Serbian local elections and was elected when the list won two mandates.

The Preokret alliance dissolved after the elections, SPO subsequently joined the electoral alliance around the Serbian Progressive Party (Srpska napredna stranka, SNS). Trbović was given the fifty-eighth position on the Progressive Party's list in the 2016 provincial election and was elected when the list won a majority victory with sixty-three out of 120 mandates. He was appointed to the assembly committee for co-operation with the national assembly in exercising the competencies of the province. He also received the fifth position on the Progressive Party's list in Kula in the 2016 local elections and was re-elected when the list won a narrow majority with nineteen out of thirty-seven seats.

There was a serious split in the SPO in 2017, and several party dissidents founded the POKS as a new organization. All three SPO delegates in the provincial assembly, including Trbović, joined the new party.

The following year, a period of political upheaval in Kula led to the dissolution of the municipal assembly and the calling of new local elections. The POKS fielded its own list; Trbović appeared in the first position and was re-elected when the list won two mandates.

Trbović did not seek re-election at the provincial level in 2020. He continues to serve in the Kula municipal assembly.
