= Euloge Ahodikpe =

Togolese footballer (born 1983)

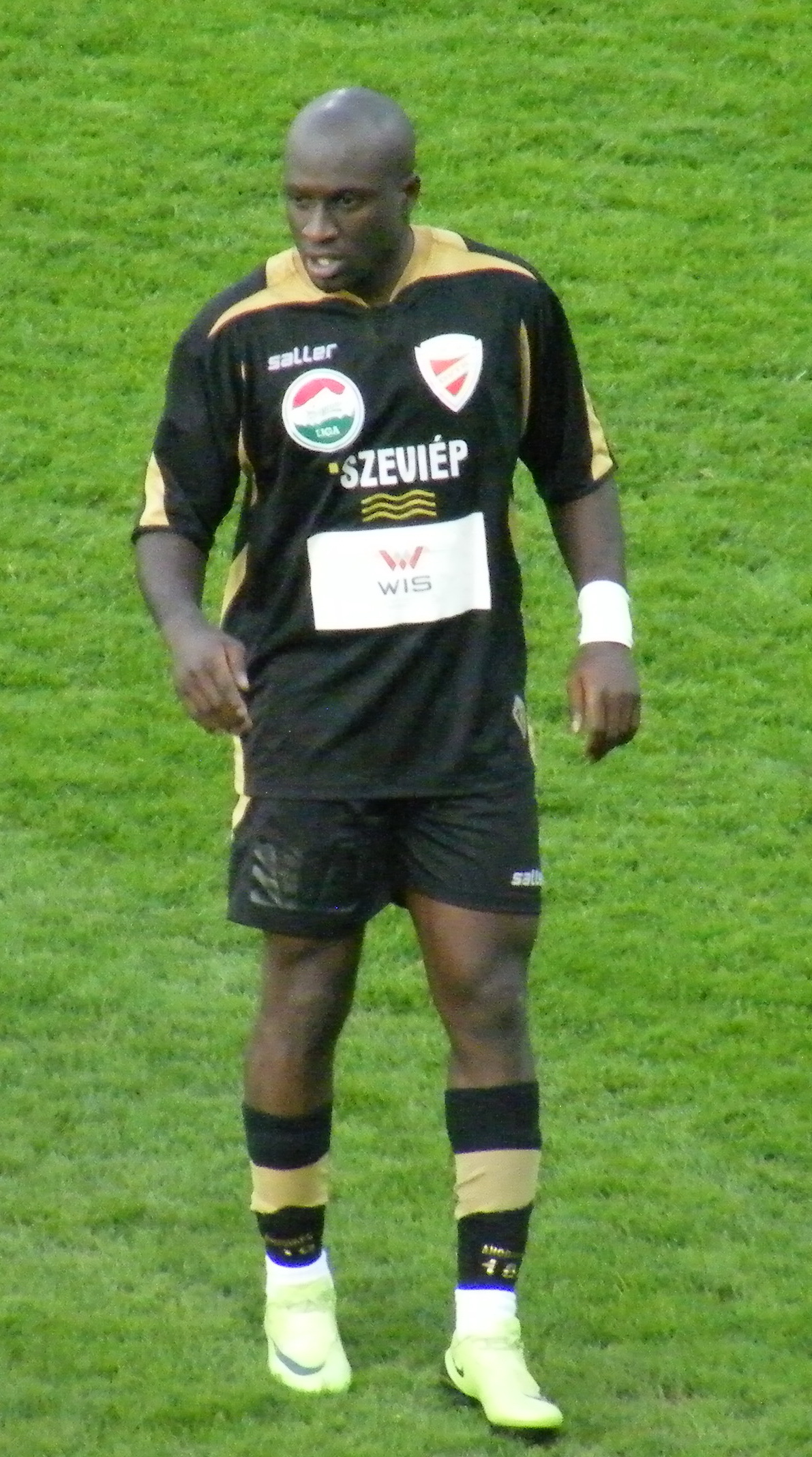
- Ahodikpe with Diósgyőr in 2009

Personal information
- Full name: Euloge Daniel Date Ahodikpe
- Date of birth: 1 May 1983 (age 43)
- Place of birth: Paris, France
- Height: 1.73 m (5 ft 8 in)
- Position: Midfielder

Youth career
- Olympique Montmartre
- ES Parisienne
- 2001–2002: Lille
- 2002–2003: Amiens

Senior career*
Years	Team	Apps	(Gls)
2003–2006	US Créteil	5	(1)
2007–2009	Lombard-Pápa	27	(4)
2008–2009	→ Diósgyőr (loan)	25	(0)
2010–2012	Diyarbakırspor	0	(0)
2012	Macclesfield Town	0	(0)
2012–2014	Al-Taawon	48	(15)
2014–2015	Lombard-Pápa	3	(0)
2017–	US Chantilly		

International career
2009–2010	Togo	9	(0)
- * Club domestic league appearances and goals as of 13:28, 10 December 2019 (UTC)

Euloge Daniel Date Ahodikpe (born 1 May 1983) is a footballer who plays as a midfielder for US Chantilly. Born in France, he represented the Togo national team.

== Early life ==
Ahodikpe was born in 1983 in the 13th arrondissement of Paris, to Togolese parents. He acquired French nationality on 16 December 1998, through the naturalization of his parents.

== Career ==
Ahodikpe started his senior career at Créteil and subsequently played for Lombard-Pápa TFC and a loan period at Diósgyőri VTK before moving to Diyarbakırspor. In the summer of 2012, he joined English non-league club Macclesfield Town but departed from the club in late September, opting to return to France.
