= Gergő Menyhért =

Hungarian footballer (born 1989)

Personal information
- Date of birth: 22 October 1989 (age 37)
- Place of birth: Miskolc, Hungary
- Height: 1.90 m (6 ft 3 in)
- Position: Defender

Youth career
- 2003: Diósgyőr
- 2003–2006: Misi
- 2006–2007: Diósgyőr

Senior career*
Years	Team	Apps	(Gls)
2007–2010	Diósgyőr	5	(0)
2007–2009	Diósgyőr II	35	(4)
2008	→ Bőcs (loan)	10	(1)
2010–2011	Kaposvölgye	21	(1)
2011–2012	Rákospalota	39	(2)
2012–2013	BKV Előre	13	(1)
2013–2014	Kazincbarcika	27	(3)
2014	→ Felsőtárkány (loan)	11	(2)
Total		161	(14)
- * Club domestic league appearances and goals

Gergő Menyhért (born 22 October 1989) is a Hungarian former professional footballer who played as a defender.

== Career ==
On 23 July 2009, Menyhért signed a two-year extension to stay with Nemzeti Bajnokság I club Diósgyőr through 2011.

== Career statistics ==
Appearances and goals by club, season and competition
Club	Season	League			Magyar Kupa		Ligakupa		Total	
Club	Season	Division	Apps	Goals	Apps	Goals	Apps	Goals	Apps	Goals
Diósgyőr	2006–07	Nemzeti Bajnokság I	2	0	1	0	—		3	0
Diósgyőr	2007–08	Nemzeti Bajnokság I	0	0	0	0	7	0	7	0
Diósgyőr	2008–09	Nemzeti Bajnokság I	3	0	—		6	0	9	0
Diósgyőr	2009–10	Nemzeti Bajnokság I	0	0	0	0	6	0	6	0
Diósgyőr	Total		5	0	1	0	19	0	25	0
Diósgyőr II	2007–08	Nemzeti Bajnokság III	13	1	—		—		13	1
Diósgyőr II	2008–09	Nemzeti Bajnokság III	16	2	—		—		16	2
Diósgyőr II	2009–10	Nemzeti Bajnokság III	6	1	—		—		6	1
Diósgyőr II	Total		35	4	—		—		35	4
Bőcs (loan)	2007–08	Nemzeti Bajnokság II	10	1	—		—		10	1
Kaposvölgye	2009–10	Nemzeti Bajnokság II	8	1	—		—		8	1
Kaposvölgye	2010–11	Nemzeti Bajnokság II	13	0	2	0	—		15	0
Kaposvölgye	Total		21	1	2	0	—		23	1
Rákospalota	2010–11	Nemzeti Bajnokság II	12	1	—		—		12	1
Rákospalota	2011–12	Nemzeti Bajnokság II	27	1	2	1	—		29	2
Rákospalota	Total		39	2	2	1	—		41	3
BKV Előre	2012–13	Nemzeti Bajnokság II	13	1	1	1	—		14	2
Kazincbarcika	2012–13	Nemzeti Bajnokság III	25	3	2	0	—		27	3
Kazincbarcika	2014–15	Nemzeti Bajnokság III	2	0	1	0	—		3	0
Kazincbarcika	Total		27	3	3	0	—		30	3
Felsőtárkány (loan)	2014–15	Nemzeti Bajnokság III	11	2	1	0	—		12	2
Career total			161	14	10	2	19	0	190	16
