= Kassim Guyazou =

Togolese footballer

Personal information
- Date of birth: January 7, 1982 (age 44)
- Place of birth: Lomé, Togo
- Height: 1.76 m (5 ft 9 in)
- Position: Midfielder

Team information
- Current team: Foolad Yazd F.C.
- Number: 28

Senior career*
Years	Team	Apps	(Gls)
–	Sara FC		
2004–2005	AS Douane		
2005–2007	Étoile Filante de Lomé		
2008–2008	Diósgyőri VTK	2	(0)
2008–2009	Steel Azin		
2009–2010	Gostaresh Foolad F.C.		
2010–	Foolad Yazd F.C.		

International career^{‡}
2001–	Togo	22	(2)
- * Club domestic league appearances and goals as of 14 May 2008 ‡ National team caps and goals as of 14 May 2008

Kassim Guyazou (born 7 January 1982) is a Togolese football (midfielder) currently playing for Foolad Yazd F.C.

== Club career ==
Guyazou previously played for Diósgyőri VTK in the Hungarian National Championship I.
