= Abass Rassou =

Cameroonian footballer

Personal information
- Date of birth: 12 December 1986 (age 39)
- Place of birth: Maroua, Cameroon
- Position: Forward

Senior career*
Years	Team	Apps	(Gls)
2005	Sahel		
2006–2007	APR		
2007	Diósgyőr	4	(0)
2009–2011	APR		

International career^{‡}
2009–2010	Rwanda	2	(0)
- * Club domestic league appearances and goals as of 16:00, 3 September 2017 (UTC+1) ‡ National team caps and goals as of 16:00, 3 September 2017 (UTC+1)

Abass Rassou (born 12 December 1986) is a Cameroonian born Rwanda footballer.
