= Norbert Farkas (footballer, born 1977) =

Hungarian footballer

Personal information
- Full name: Norbert Farkas
- Date of birth: 2 January 1977 (age 49)
- Place of birth: Pécs, Hungary
- Height: 1.82 m (5 ft 11 1/2 in)
- Position: Defender

Senior career*
Years	Team	Apps	(Gls)
1996–1999	Pécsi MFC	44	(1)
1999–2000	Beremendi Építők	23	(3)
2000–2002	Marcali VFC	54	(7)
2002–2005	Kaposvári Rákóczi FC	83	(3)
2005–2006	Diósgyőri VTK	28	(0)
2006–2007	Digenis Morphou	18	(0)
2007–2008	Diósgyőri VTK	10	(0)
2008	KA Akureyri	37	(3)
Total		297	(17)
- * Club domestic league appearances and goals

Norbert Farkas (born 2 January 1977) is a Hungarian former footballer who played as a defender.
