= Steve Bessong =

Cameroonian footballer

Personal information
- Full name: Steve Libiih Leo Bessong
- Date of birth: February 10, 1989 (age 37)
- Place of birth: Yaoundé, Cameroon
- Height: 1.85 m (6 ft 1 in)
- Position: Striker

Team information
- Current team: Fogape Yaoundé
- Number: 15

Youth career
- –2006: Dauphins FC

Senior career*
Years	Team	Apps	(Gls)
2007	Diósgyőri VTK	7	(1)
2008–present	Fogape Yaoundé		
- * Club domestic league appearances and goals as of 22 December 2007

Steve Libiih Leo Bessong (born February 10, 1989, in Yaoundé) is a professional Cameroonian footballer currently playing for Fogape Yaoundé.

== Career ==
He began his career by Dauphins FC and joined than in January 2007 Diósgyőri VTK, after one year joined back to Cameroon and signed by Fogape Yaoundé. Bessong had a try out by Trois-Rivières Attak and Montreal Impact.
