= Florin Pelecaci =

Romanian footballer

Personal information
- Full name: Florin Ioan Pelecaci
- Date of birth: 6 January 1980 (age 46)
- Place of birth: Baia Mare, Romania
- Height: 1.72 m (5 ft 8 in)
- Position: Midfielder

Team information
- Current team: F.C. Romania

Senior career*
Years	Team	Apps	(Gls)
1999–2002	FC Baia Mare	37	(6)
2002–2006	Gloria 1922 Bistriţa	41	(1)
2006	→ Srem (loan)	1	(0)
2006–2007	Unirea Urziceni	6	(0)
2007–2008	Progresul București	16	(0)
2008–2009	Diósgyőri VTK	23	(1)
2009	Gloria Bistriţa	0	(0)
2009–2010	Bath City	11	(1)
2010	Truro City	2	(1)
2010	Thurrock	1	(0)
2011–2015	Enfield 1893	1	(1)
2015–	F.C. Romania		
- * Club domestic league appearances and goals as of 18 October 2009

Florin Ioan Pelecaci (born 6 January 1980) is a Romanian footballer who currently plays for F.C. Romania. He speaks Romanian, Italian and English.

== Career ==
He played for Romanian clubs FC Baia Mare, CF Gloria 1922 Bistriţa, FK Srem, FC Unirea Urziceni and FC National București before he moved to Hungary.

=== Diósgyőr ===
He joined Diósgyőri VTK in January 2008, but he rarely played as he suffered from a number of injuries. Whilst at DVTK he scored one goal, against Vasas on 22 August 2008, a shot from 40 metres.

=== English football ===
He subsequently joined Bath City scoring a great goal in FA Cup game, before leaving to join Truro City in January 2010. He scored on his debut for Truro City, in a 3–0 away victory against Cambridge City. In August 2010 he joined Thurrock but he did not play being unhappy with the condition offered.
