= Tibor Bokros =

Hungarian football player

Personal information
- Full name: Tibor Bokros
- Date of birth: 28 August 1989 (age 37)
- Place of birth: Sátoraljaújhely, Hungary
- Height: 1.82 m (5 ft 11 1/2 in)
- Position: Defender

Team information
- Current team: Tiszaújváros

Youth career
- 2002–2006: Sárospatak
- 2006–2008: Diósgyőr

Senior career*
Years	Team	Apps	(Gls)
2008–2010	Diósgyőr	10	(0)
2010–2011	Bőcs	21	(0)
2011–2016	Balmazújváros	106	(3)
2016–2018	Debreceni VSC	0	(0)
2016–2017	→ Balmazújváros (loan)	19	(2)
2017–2018	→ Balmazújváros (loan)	0	(0)
2018–2019	Cigánd		
2019–	Tiszaújváros		
- * Club domestic league appearances and goals as of 6 September 2017

Tibor Bokros (born 28 August 1989) is a Hungarian football player who currently plays for FC Tiszaújváros.

== Career ==
In August 2018, Bokros joined Cigánd SE. In 2019, he then signed with FC Tiszaújváros.
