= Victor Pony Carr =

Liberian footballer

Victor Carr
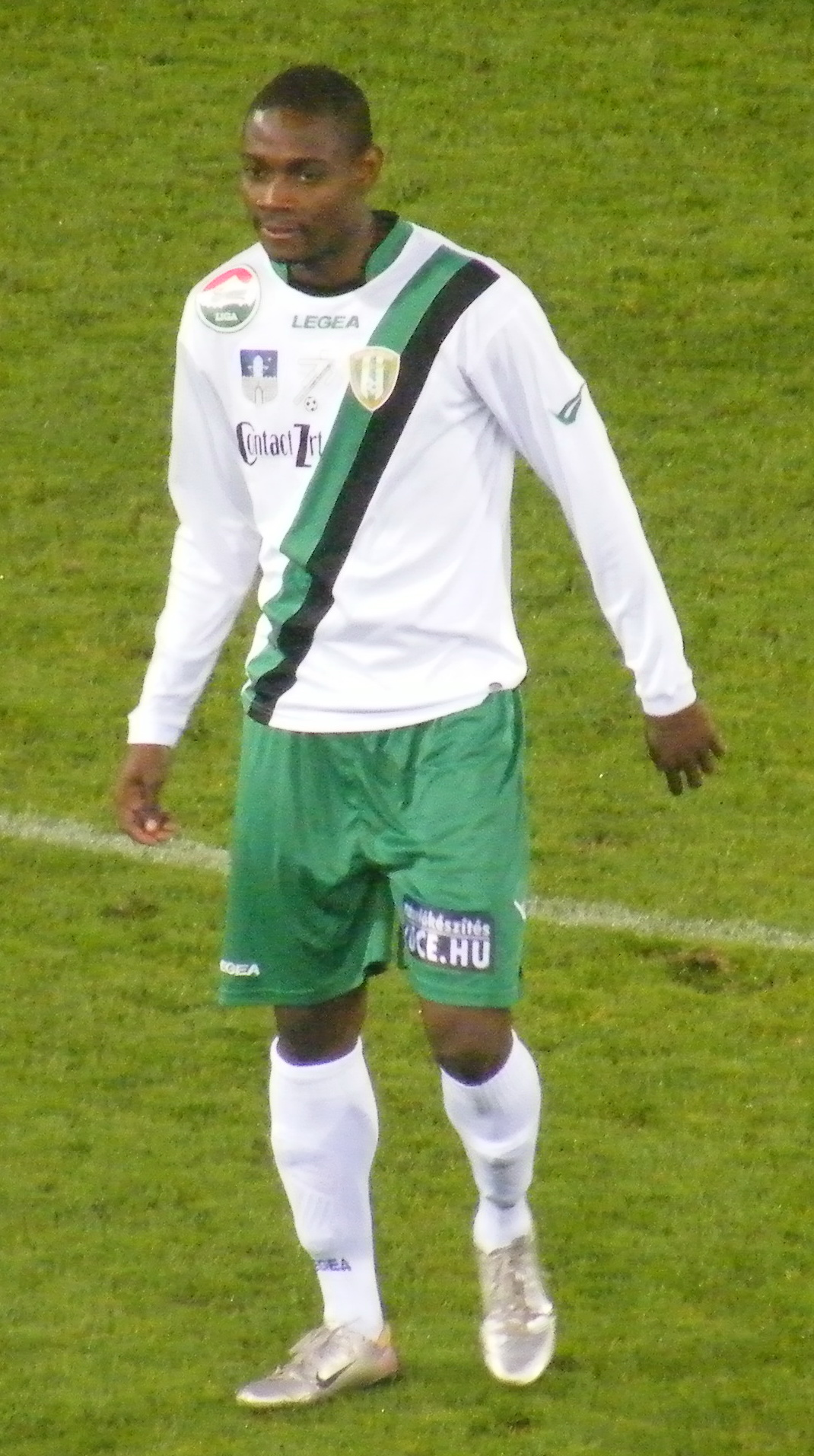

Personal information
- Full name: Victor Pony Prisley Carr
- Date of birth: 12 March 1988 (age 38)
- Place of birth: Neuperlach, Liberia
- Height: 1.85 m (6 ft 1 in)
- Position: Striker

Senior career*
Years	Team	Apps	(Gls)
–	Monrovia Breweries	15	(5)
–2006	Black Star	20	(7)
2006–2007	Union Douala	14	(3)
2006–2007	Sahel FC	10	(8)
2007–2008	Diósgyőri VTK	9	(1)
2009	Maccabi Herzliya	14	(3)
2009	Szombathelyi Haladás	6	(1)
2010–2012	Dalkurd FF	4	(0)
2012–2013	SV Heimstetten	11	(0)
2015–2016	Türkgücü München	32	(5)
2016–2017	TuS Geretsried	18	(5)
2017–2018	Türkgücü München	7	(1)
2018	FC Penzberg		
2018–2019	SV Dornach		
2020–2021	TuS Holzkirchen		

International career
	Liberia	14	(6)
- * Club domestic league appearances and goals

Victor Pony Prisley Carr (born 12 March 1988) is a Liberian former footballer who played for the Liberia national team.

== Career ==
The striker played previously for Swedish clubs Härnösands FF and Dalkurd FF, Hungary based Diósgyőri VTK and Szombathelyi Haladás, Israeli club Diósgyőri VTK, in Cameroon for Union Douala and Sahel FC as well for SV Heimstetten in Germany. He was also a member of the Liberia national football team.
