= Despot Višković =

Serbian footballer

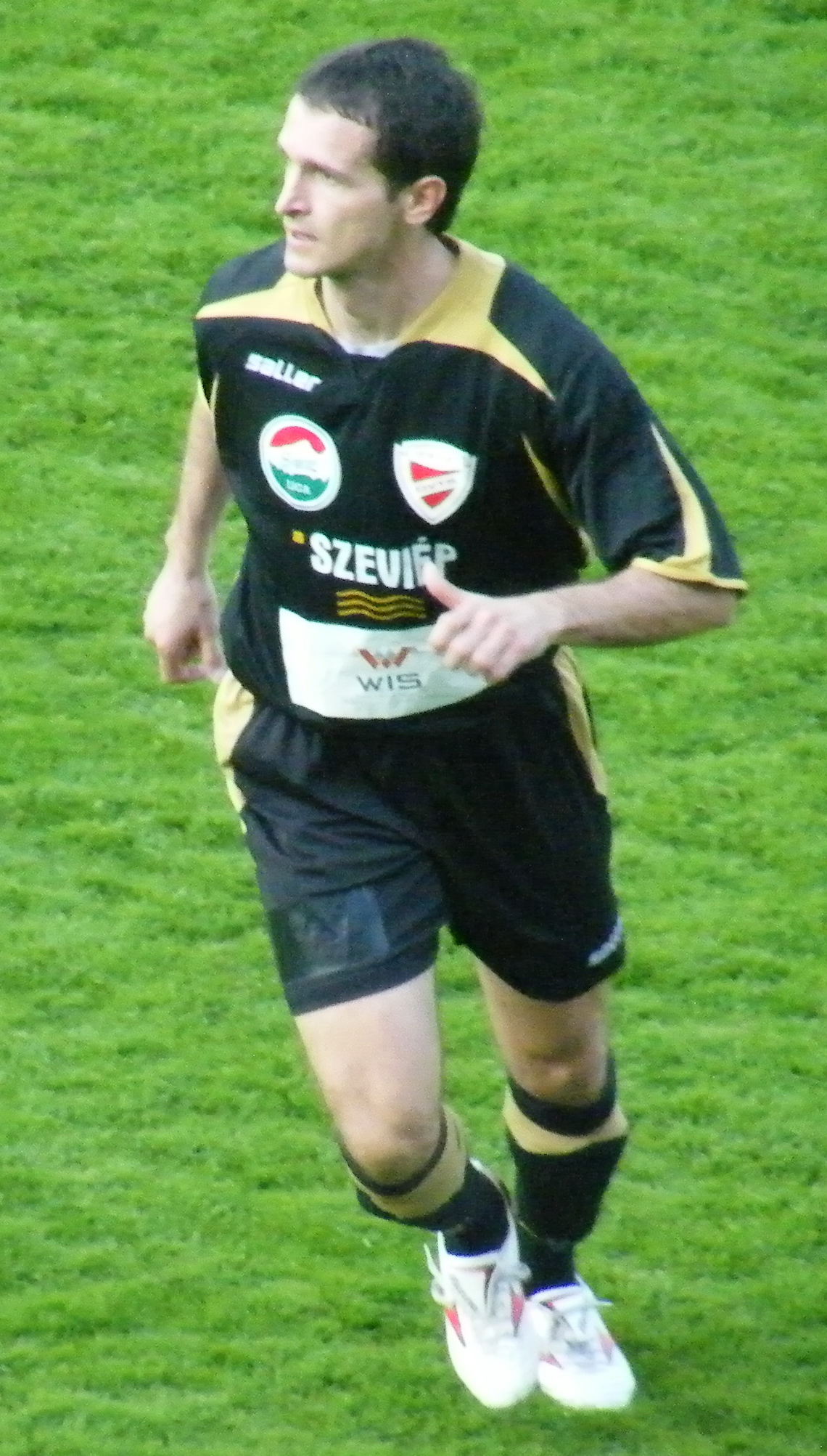

Personal information
- Full name: Despot Višković
- Date of birth: 3 March 1980 (age 46)
- Place of birth: Zrenjanin, SFR Yugoslavia
- Height: 1.84 m (6 ft 1/2 in)
- Position: Defender

Senior career*
Years	Team	Apps	(Gls)
2001–2002	Mladost Apatin	33	(1)
2002–2005	Hajduk Kula	46	(0)
2005	Radnički Beograd	17	(0)
2006	Jedinstvo Ub	19	(0)
2006	Qingdao Jonoon	12	(0)
2007	Srem Jakovo	10	(1)
2008	Novi Pazar	16	(0)
2008–2009	Jászberény	6	(0)
2009–2010	Diósgyőr	21	(0)
2010–2011	Novi Pazar	25	(0)
2011	Al-Ansar	3	(0)
2012	Radnički Obrenovac	13	(0)
2012	Srem	11	(0)
2013	Posavac Tišma		
2013–2014	Jedinstvo Surčin		
2015	YPA	9	(0)
2016	Kokkola-62		
2017–XXXX	Jedinstvo Surčin		

Managerial career
- 2022: Hajduk Divoš
- 2022–2023: Napredak Kruševac (assistant)
- * Club domestic league appearances and goals

Despot Višković (Serbian Cyrillic: Деспот Вишковић; born 3 March 1980) is a Serbian retired football defender.

Born in Zrenjanin, SR Serbia, he has played with Serbian clubs FK Mladost Apatin, FK Hajduk Kula, FK Radnički Beograd, FK Jedinstvo Ub and FK Srem Jakovo, FK Radnički Obrenovac, beside Chinese Qingdao Jonoon F.C. and Hungarian clubs Jászberény SE and Diósgyőri VTK.
