= Boris Miličić =

Serbian footballer

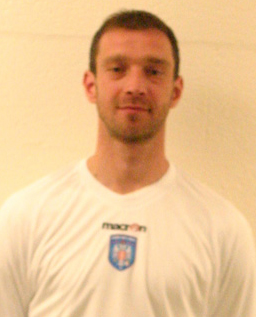
- Miličić in 2012

Personal information
- Full name: Boris Miličić
- Date of birth: April 4, 1979 (age 47)
- Place of birth: Vrbas, SFR Yugoslavia
- Height: 1.91 m (6 ft 3 in)
- Position: Central defender

Senior career*
Years	Team	Apps	(Gls)
1996–2002	Vrbas	99	(6)
2002–2003	Mladost Apatin	34	(6)
2003–2004	Hajduk Kula	11	(0)
2004	→ Veternik (loan)	13	(1)
2004–2005	Budućnost Banatski Dvor	12	(0)
2004–2005	→ Vrbas (loan)	13	(1)
2005–2007	Inđija	62	(8)
2007–2008	Javor Ivanjica	20	(6)
2008–2010	Diósgyőr	35	(5)
2010	Javor Ivanjica	10	(0)
2010	Inđija	3	(0)
2011	Szolnok	14	(2)
2011–2013	Serbian White Eagles		
2014	North York Astros		
2015	Scarborough		
2015–2018	Brantford Galaxy		
- * Club domestic league appearances and goals

Boris Miličić (Serbian Cyrillic: Борис Миличић; born April 4, 1979) is a Serbian retired footballer.

== Playing career ==
Miličić played with FK Mladost Apatin, FK Hajduk Kula, FK Veternik, FK Buducnost Banatski Dvor, and FK Javor Ivanjica in the Serbian First League. He played in the Serbian SuperLiga with FK Inđija. He played with Diósgyőri VTK in the Nemzeti Bajnokság I. He also had a stint the Nemzeti Bajnokság I with Szolnoki MÁV FC. In 2011, he went overseas to Canada to sign with the Serbian White Eagles FC of the Canadian Soccer League. In 2014, he signed with the North York Astros, and helped the club secure a postseason berth by finishing fourth in the overall standings. After North York's departure from the CSL he signed with expansion franchise Scarborough SC. Midway through the season he was transferred to Brantford Galaxy.
