= Dane Trbović =

Serbian footballer

Personal information
- Full name: Dane Trbović
- Date of birth: 15 April 1986 (age 40)
- Place of birth: Belgrade, SFR Yugoslavia
- Height: 1.80 m (5 ft 11 in)
- Position: Defender

Senior career*
Years	Team	Apps	(Gls)
2003–2005	Vojvodina	1	(0)
2004–2005	→ Šajkaš Kovilj (loan)	14	(0)
2005–2006	Fruškogorac	37	(6)
2006–2007	Voždovac	7	(0)
2007	→ Mačva Šabac (loan)	4	(0)
2007	Radnički Bajmok	1	(0)
2008	Diósgyőr	5	(0)
2009	Jugović Kać		
2009–2013	Cement Beočin		
2013–2015	Bačka Pačir		
- * Club domestic league appearances and goals

Dane Trbović (Serbian Cyrillic: Дане Трбовић; born 15 April 1986) is a Serbian retired footballer who played as a defender.

He played with FK Vojvodina in the First League of Serbia and Montenegro and Hungarian First League club Diósgyőri VTK among other lower league clubs in Serbia.
