= Tamás Szélpál =

Hungarian footballer

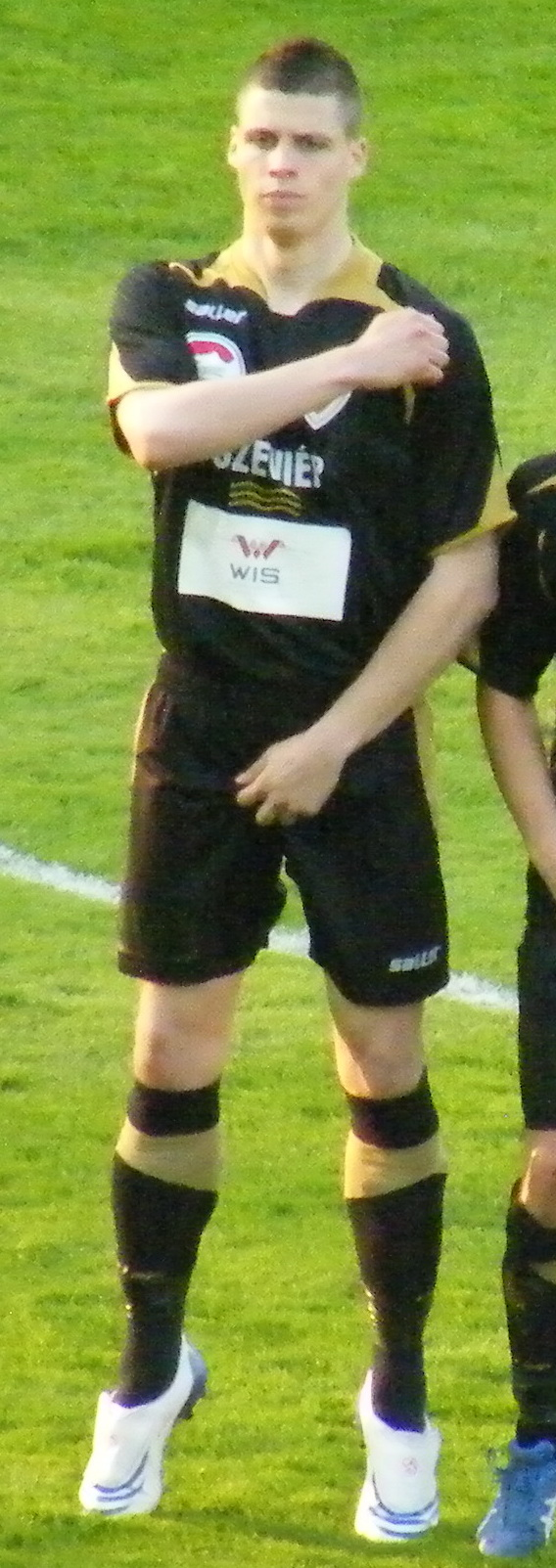

Personal information
- Date of birth: 11 July 1987 (age 39)
- Place of birth: Szeged, Hungary
- Height: 1.90 m (6 ft 3 in)
- Position: Midfielder

Team information
- Current team: Békéscsaba 1912 Előre SE
- Number: 7

Senior career*
Years	Team	Apps	(Gls)
2003–2005	Szeged LC	23	(0)
2005–2006	Makó FC	11	(0)
2006–2008	Tisza Volán SC	59	(20)
2008–2009	Diósgyőri VTK	29	(0)
2009–	Debreceni VSC	0	(0)
2009	→ Debreceni VSC II	1	(0)
2009–2010	→ Nyíregyháza Spartacus (loan)	4	(0)
2010	→ Szolnoki MÁV FC (loan)	9	(0)
2010–	→ Békéscsaba 1912 Előre SE (loan)	35	(2)
- * Club domestic league appearances and goals as of 27 November 2011

Tamás Szélpál (born 11 July 1987) is a Hungarian football player who currently plays for Békéscsaba 1912 Előre SE.
