= László Köteles =

Hungarian footballer (born 1984)

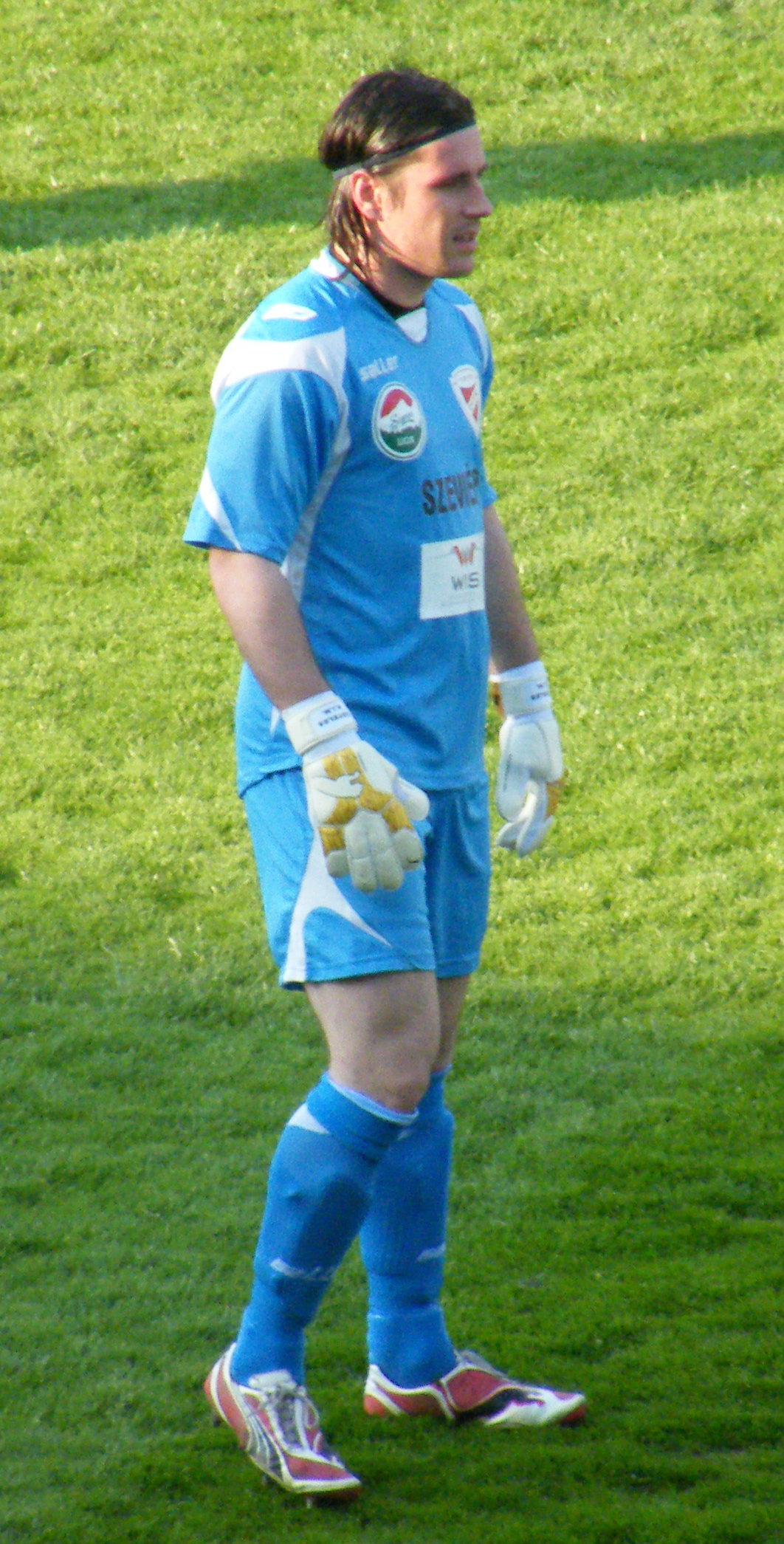

Personal information
- Date of birth: 1 September 1984 (age 42)
- Place of birth: Makó, Hungary
- Height: 1.85 m (6 ft 1 in)
- Position: Goalkeeper

Senior career*
Years	Team	Apps	(Gls)
2002	Fehérvár	0	(0)
2003	Železnik	0	(0)
2003–2004	Grafičar Beograd	43	(0)
2005	Bežanija	0	(0)
2005–2007	Vác	47	(0)
2007–2009	Diósgyőri VTK	58	(0)
2009–2010	→ Genk (loan)	16	(0)
2010–2018	Genk	154	(0)
2016–2017	→ Waasland-Beveren (loan)	22	(0)
2018	Copenhagen	1	(0)
Total		241	(0)
- * Club domestic league appearances and goals

László Köteles (Hungarian pronunciation: [ˈlaːsloː ˈkøtɛlɛʃ]; born 1 September 1984) is a Hungarian former football goalkeeper.

== Club career ==
=== Early career ===
Köteles played for Vác and Diósgyőr in the Hungarian NB I, and with FK Železnik, RFK Grafičar Beograd and FK Bežanija in Serbia and Montenegro.

=== Genk ===
In August 2009, Lázsló Köteles joined the Belgian KRC Genk on a one-year loan with an option to make the move permanent. The club has already had two other Hungarian players (Dániel Tőzsér and Balázs Tóth).

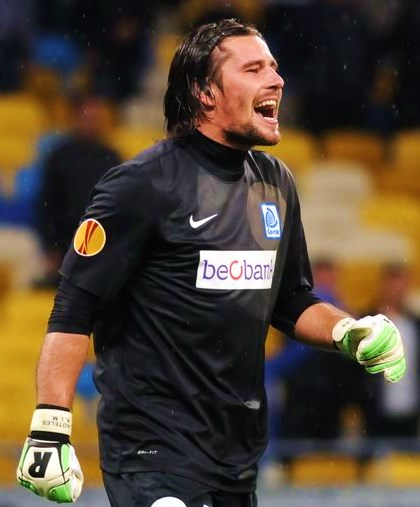
László Köteles with Genk

It was uncertain whether KRC Genk would continue with Köteles as the Hungarian has had some flaws in a few games, but in the play-offs of the Belgian league he got back to his regular level. In a small amount of time, Köteles has gained a lot of popularity with Genk fans due to his enthusiastic style of goalkeeping and the interaction with the fans, making them think of the legendary and unmatched popular goalkeeper István Brockhauser (also Hungarian) when the latter was first goalkeeper at KRC Genk, back in the 1990s.

On 23 August 2011, Köteles played an important role in qualifying for the group stages of the UEFA Champions League 2011–12 season. Genk beat Maccabi Haifa 4–1 on penalties. Köteles saved the penalties of Vladimir Dvalishvili and Eyal Golasa.

On 13 September 2011, Köteles debuted in the UEFA Champions League against Valencia. Köteles kept a clean sheet since the result was a goalless draw.

On 1 November 2011, Köteles saved the penalty shot by David Luiz and contributed to the second point gained in the UEFA Champions League 2011–12 season for Genk against Chelsea F.C. The final result was 1–1.

In January 2018, Genk and Köteles dissolved their contract by mutual agreement.

=== Retirement ===
On 5 March 2018, he was signed by F.C. Copenhagen on a short-term contract.

== International career ==
He was called up several times to be part of the Hungarian national team but never made a debut.

== Honours ==
Genk

- Belgian Pro League (1): 2010–11
- Belgian Cup (1): 2012–13
- Belgian Super Cup (1): 2011
