= Norbert Kállai =

Hungarian football player

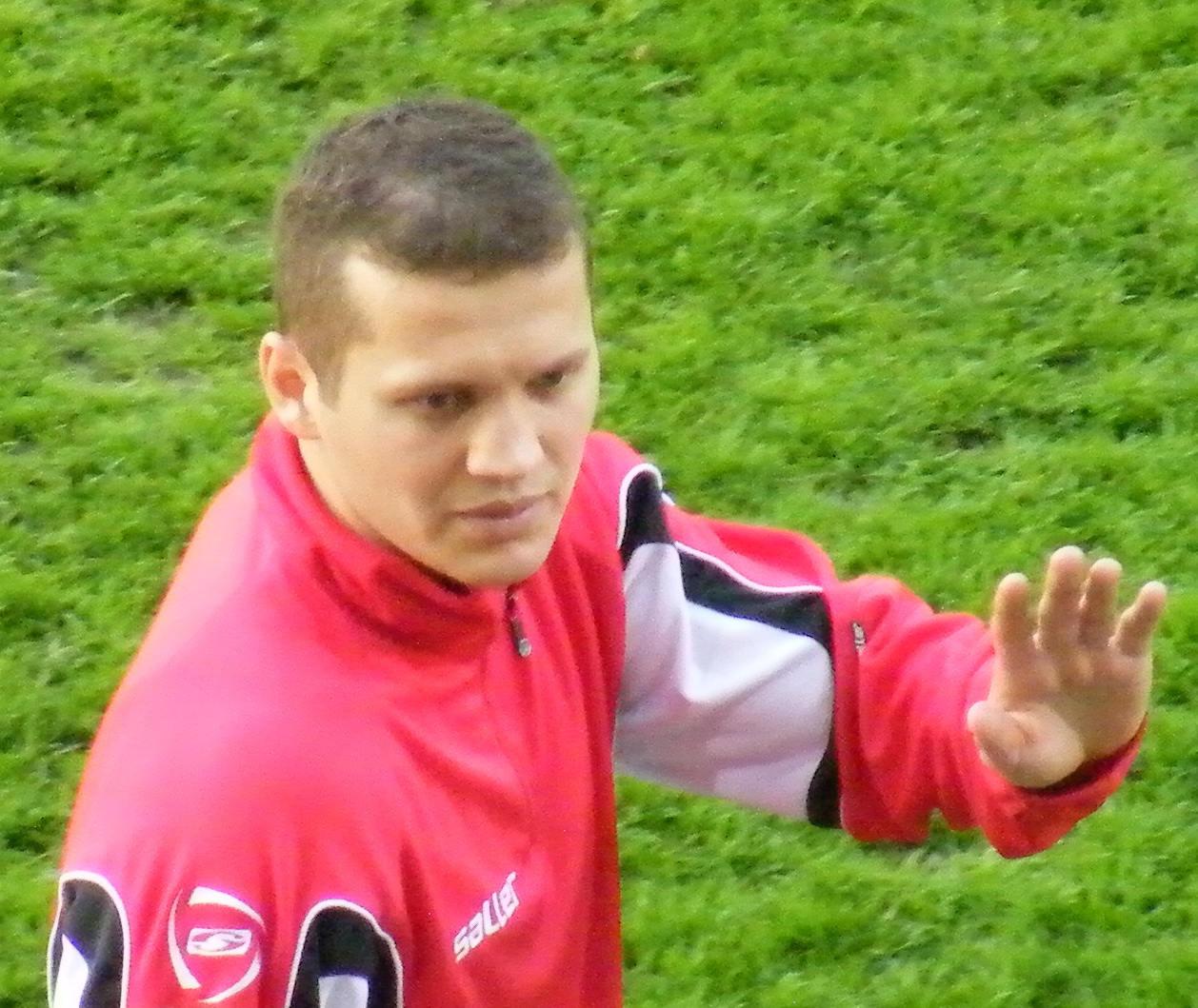

Personal information
- Date of birth: 6 March 1984 (age 42)
- Place of birth: Abony, Hungary
- Height: 1.89 m (6 ft 2 1/2 in)
- Position: Defender

Team information
- Current team: Békéscsaba 1776 Előre SE
- Number: 4

Senior career*
Years	Team	Apps	(Gls)
2004–2005	Zalaegerszegi TE	1	(0)
2005–2006	→ Kaposvölgye VSC (loan)	10	(0)
2006–2007	Hévíz FC	24	(2)
2007–2010	Diósgyőri VTK	27	(0)
2010	Hévíz FC	13	(2)
2010–2011	Kaposvölgye VSC	10	(0)
2011–	Békéscsaba 1912 Előre SE	29	(7)
- * Club domestic league appearances and goals as of 27 November 2011

Norbert Kállai (born 6 March 1984) is a retired Hungarian football player who currently plays for Békéscsaba 1912 Előre SE.
