= Dávid Kleiber =

Hungarian footballer

Personal information
- Full name: Dávid Kleiber
- Date of birth: 19 January 1990 (age 36)
- Place of birth: Miskolc, Hungary
- Height: 1.85 m (6 ft 1 in)
- Position: Forward

Team information
- Current team: Budapest Honvéd FC

Senior career*
Years	Team	Apps	(Gls)
2007–	Diósgyőri VTK	20	(12)
2007–	→ Diósgyőri VTK II	39	(5)
2010–	→ Budapest Honvéd FC (loan)	0	(0)
- * Club domestic league appearances and goals as of 23 February 2010

Dávid Kleiber (born 19 January 1990 in Miskolc) is a Hungarian football player who currently plays for Budapest Honvéd FC. He was the best young player in 2007.
