= 2008–09 Nyíregyháza Spartacus FC season =

Nyíregyháza
2008–09 season
- Owner: Gyula Sziky
- Chairman: Zsolt Banka
- Manager: Attila Révész (until 12 April 2009); András Szabó (caretaker, from 12 April to 1 May); József Tajti (caretaker, from 2 May)
- Stadium: Városi Stadion
- Nemzeti Bajnokság I: 14th
- Magyar Kupa: Third round
- Ligakupa: Group stage
- Highest home attendance: 7,000 v Debrecen (17 August 2008, Nemzeti Bajnokság I)
- Lowest home attendance: 200 v Debrecen (26 November 2008, Ligakupa)
- Average home league attendance: 3,347
- Biggest win: 4–0 v Rákospalota (Home, 30 August 2008, Nemzeti Bajnokság I); 4–0 v Bőcs (Home, 7 February 2009, Ligakupa); 4–0 v Vasas (Home, 11 February 2009, Ligakupa)
- Biggest defeat: 0–4 v Debrecen (Away, 14 March 2009, Nemzeti Bajnokság I)

The 2008–09 season was Nyíregyháza Spartacus Football Club's 10th competitive season, 2nd consecutive season in the Nemzeti Bajnokság I and 82nd season in existence as a football club. In addition to the domestic league, Nyíregyháza participated in that season's editions of the Magyar Kupa and the Ligakupa.

== Squad ==
Squad at end of season

Note: Flags indicate national team as defined under FIFA eligibility rules; some limited exceptions apply. Players may hold more than one non-FIFA nationality.

No.	Pos.	Nation	Player
1	GK	HUN	Dániel Illyés
3	DF	ROU	Claudiu Cornaci
4	DF	HUN	Balázs Nánási
5	MF	HUN	Attila Zabos
7	DF	HUN	István Lakatos
9	FW	ROU	Bogdan Apostu
11	MF	HUN	Krisztián Varga
12	MF	HUN	László Miskolczi
15	FW	HUN	Ádám Fekete
16	MF	HUN	Bence Bakos
17	MF	HUN	Tibor Hegedűs
18	DF	CMR	Yves Mboussi
20	MF	HUN	Tibor Minczér

No.	Pos.	Nation	Player
21	MF	HUN	Árpád Majoros
22	GK	HUN	Norbert Tóth
23	MF	HUN	Péter Odrobéna
24	DF	ROU	Szabolcs Perenyi
25	FW	HUN	Norbert Szilágyi
26	DF	HUN	Dávid Oláh
27	MF	HON	Luis Ramos
28	FW	CIV	Sindou Dosso
29	DF	ROU	Cosmin Goia
33	GK	ROU	Filip Lăzăreanu
40	DF	GEO	Davit Imedashvili
41	FW	MKD	Aco Stojkov
—	MF	HUN	Szilárd Éles

== Competitions ==
=== Overview ===
Competition	First match	Last match	Starting round	Final position	Record							
Competition	First match	Last match	Starting round	Final position	Pld	W	D	L	GF	GA	GD	Win %
Nemzeti Bajnokság I	26 July 2008	30 May 2009	Matchday 1	14th	30	7	11	12	32	41	−9	23.33
Magyar Kupa	3 September 2008	3 September 2008	Third round	Third round	1	0	0	1	0	1	−1	0.00
Ligakupa	1 October 2008	11 February 2009	Group stage	Group stage	10	3	2	5	19	18	+1	30.00
Total					41	10	13	18	51	60	−9	24.39

Source: Competitions

=== Nemzeti Bajnokság I ===
==== League table ====
Pos	Team	Pld	W	D	L	GF	GA	GD	Pts	Qualification or relegation
12	Diósgyőr	30	9	6	15	29	45	−16	33	
13	Budapest Honvéd	30	8	8	14	31	46	−15	32	Qualification for Europa League third qualifying round (Note: Budapest Honvéd won the 2008–09 Hungarian Cup and thereby qualified for the third qualifying round of the UEFA Europa League.)
14	Nyíregyháza	30	7	11	12	32	41	−9	32	
15	Siófok (R)	30	8	2	20	30	56	−26	26	Relegation to Nemzeti Bajnokság II
16	Rákospalota (R)	30	3	6	21	33	73	−40	15	Relegation to Nemzeti Bajnokság II

Source: soccerway.com
Rules for classification: 1st points; 2nd overall wins; 3rd goal difference; 4th goals scored
(R) Relegated

==== Results summary ====
Overall								Home						Away					
Pld	W	D	L	GF	GA	GD	Pts	W	D	L	GF	GA	GD	W	D	L	GF	GA	GD
30	7	11	12	32	41	−9	32	4	8	3	23	18	+5	3	3	9	9	23	−14

Source: Hungarian Football Federation

==== Results by round ====
Round	1	2	3	4	5	6	7	8	9	10	11	12	13	14	15	16	17	18	19	20	21	22	23	24	25	26	27	28	29	30
Ground	A	H	A	H	A	H	A	H	A	H	A	H	A	H	A	H	A	H	A	H	A	H	A	H	A	H	A	H	A	H
Result	L	W	L	D	D	W	L	W	W	D	W	D	W	D	D	L	L	L	L	D	D	L	L	D	L	D	L	D	L	W
Position	15	10	15	13	12	8	10	7	5	8	6	7	5	5	5	7	10	10	11	12	12	13	14	14	14	14	14	14	14	14
Points	0	3	3	4	5	8	8	11	14	15	18	19	22	23	24	24	24	24	24	25	26	26	26	27	27	28	28	29	29	32

Source: Matches
A = Away; H = Home; W = Win; D = Draw; L = Loss

==== Matches ====
26 July 2008 1	Újpest	1–0	Nyíregyháza	Budapest
20:00 CEST (UTC+2)	Kabát 40'; Vaskó (yellow card) 43'; Remili (yellow card) 50'	Report	Belényesi (yellow card) 17'; Goia (yellow card) 26'; Dosso (yellow card) 43'; Lăzăreanu (red card) 66'	Stadium: Szusza Ferenc Stadion; Attendance: 4,449; Referee: Sándor Andó-Szabó; Assistant referees: György Ring, Zsolt Butkai; Fourth official: Gergely Szőts

2 August 2008 2	Nyíregyháza	1–0	Siófok	Nyíregyháza
20:00 CEST (UTC+2)	Cornaci (yellow card) 31', (goal) 67'; Zabos (yellow card) 45'; Dosso (yellow card) 56'; Lippai (yellow card) 58'	Report	Magasföldi (yellow card) 45'; Lipcsei (yellow card) 68'; Forgács (yellow card) 84'	Stadium: Városi Stadion; Attendance: 5,200; Referee: Gergely Sulyok; Assistant referees: Attila Kelemen, Dr. Zsolt Varga; Fourth official: Ádám Farkas

9 August 2008 3	Haladás	3–0	Nyíregyháza	Szombathely
20:00 CEST (UTC+2)	Oross 39'; Rajos 41', 50'	Report	Lippai (yellow card) 24'; Miskolczi (yellow card) 73'	Stadium: Rohonci út Attendance: 6,000; Referee: Szabolcs Szilasi; Assistant referees: Oszkár Lémon, István Iványi; Fourth official: Dávid Ákos

17 August 2008 4	Nyíregyháza	1–1	Debrecen	Nyíregyháza
20:00 CEST (UTC+2)	Miskolczi (yellow card) 43'; Mboussi (yellow card) 45'; Apostu 50'; Minczér (yellow card) 53'; Goia (yellow card) 72'	Report	Leandro 28'; Bernáth (yellow card) 41'; Z. Takács (yellow card) 48'; Szűcs (yellow card) 54'	Stadium: Városi Stadion; Attendance: 7,000; Referee: Zsolt Szabó; Assistant referees: Róbert Kispál, Zoltán Pápai; Fourth official: Róbert Nagy

23 August 2008 5	Kecskemét	1–1	Nyíregyháza	Kecskemét
20:00 CEST (UTC+2)	Savić (yellow card) 44'; Schindler (yellow card) 60'; Alempijević (yellow card) 78'; Litsingi 90+2'	Report	Goia (yellow card) 28'; Apostu 49', (yellow card) 72'; Cornaci (red card) 74'; Dosso (yellow card) 76'; Zabos (yellow card) 82'; Ramos (yellow card) 90+3'	Stadium: Széktói Stadion; Attendance: 4,000; Referee: Tamás Bognár; Assistant referees: István Albert, János Medovarszki; Fourth official: Miklós Tuczai

30 August 2008 6	Nyíregyháza	4–0	Rákospalota	Nyíregyháza
20:00 CEST (UTC+2)	Ramos (yellow card) 18'; Apostu 20', 42', 68'; Miskolczi (yellow card) 22'; Shevel 78'; Bárányos (yellow card) 90+2'	Report	Erős (red card) 22'; Balaskó (yellow card) 34'; Rása (yellow card) 79'; Cseri (yellow card) 90+1'	Stadium: Városi Stadion; Attendance: 3,000; Referee: Ferenc Bede; Assistant referees: Gyula Ortó, Tamás Márkus; Fourth official: Tibor Gyarmati II

13 September 2008 7	Kaposvár	1–0	Nyíregyháza	Kaposvár
20:00 CEST (UTC+2)	Zahorecz 19', (yellow card) 35'; Z. Farkas (yellow card) 46'; Obrić (yellow card) 77'; Grúz (red card) 84'	Report	Lippai (yellow card) 39'; Ramos (yellow card) 50'; Cornaci (red card) 71'; Miskolczi (yellow card) 77'; Mboussi (red card) 90+4'	Stadium: Rákóczi Stadion; Attendance: 2,500; Referee: Krisztián Király; Assistant referees: László Viszokai, Zoltán Kis; Fourth official: Balázs Lak

20 September 2008 8	Nyíregyháza	3–0	Honvéd	Nyíregyháza
19:00 CEST (UTC+2)	Apostu 36', 63'; Ramos 56'	Report		Stadium: Városi Stadion; Attendance: 2,000; Referee: Tamás Arany; Assistant referees: Attila Kelemen, Gyula Fehér; Fourth official: J. Zoltán Kovács

28 September 2008 9	MTK	1–2	Nyíregyháza	Budapest
17:30 CEST (UTC+2)	Lambulić (yellow card) 31'; Urbán 44', (yellow card) 73'	Report	Apostu 33' (pen.); Stojkov 47'; Zabos (yellow card) 49'; Goia (yellow card) 52'; Belényesi (yellow card) 63'	Stadium: Hidegkuti Nándor Stadion; Attendance: 450; Referee: Ádám Németh; Assistant referees: Dr. Péter Kovács, Zsolt Butkai; Fourth official: Csaba Molnár

4 October 2008 10	Nyíregyháza	2–2	Diósgyőr	Nyíregyháza
18:00 CEST (UTC+2)	Apostu 19'; Ramos (yellow card) 36'; Miskolczi 63'	Report	Miličić 6', (yellow card) 24'; Mi. Tóth 16', (red card) 35'; V. Sebők (yellow card) 47'; Honma (yellow card) 67'	Stadium: Városi Stadion; Attendance: 5,000; Referee: Ferenc Bede; Assistant referees: György Ring, István Tóth; Fourth official: Gergő Király

18 October 2008 11	Paks	1–2	Nyíregyháza	Paks
18:00 CEST (UTC+2)	Kriston 36'; Pandur (yellow card) 45'; Éger (red card) 90'; Tamási (yellow card) 90+3'	Report	Bárányos 23', 90+5'; Shevel (yellow card) 45'; Perenyi (yellow card) 56'; Zabos (yellow card) 90'; Odrobéna (red card) 90+4'	Stadium: Fehérvári úti Stadion; Attendance: 2,000; Referee: Péter Solymosi; Assistant referees: Oszkár Lémon, István Iványi; Fourth official: Dávid Ákos

26 October 2008 12	Nyíregyháza	1–1	Zalaegerszeg	Nyíregyháza
18:00 CET (UTC+1)	Cornaci (yellow card) 56'; Stojkov 82'	Report	Davidov (yellow card) 34'; Waltner 53'; P. Máté I (yellow card) 83'; Méyé (yellow card) 90'	Stadium: Városi Stadion; Attendance: 4,000; Referee: Roland Veizer; Assistant referees: Péter Berettyán, Tibor Vígh; Fourth official: Ferenc Szöllősi

1 November 2008 13	Győr	0–1	Nyíregyháza	Győr
18:00 CET (UTC+1)		Report	Ramos (yellow card) 59'; Stojkov 60'	Stadium: ETO Park; Attendance: 2,200; Referee: József Berger; Assistant referees: Attila Forgács, Balázs Huszár; Fourth official: Csaba Pintér

8 November 2008 14	Nyíregyháza	1–1	Fehérvár	Nyíregyháza
18:00 CET (UTC+1)	Bárányos 17'; Zabos (yellow card) 59'; Mboussi (yellow card) 85'	Report	Koller 63'	Stadium: Városi Stadion; Attendance: 4,000; Referee: Szabolcs Szilasi; Assistant referees: Gyula Ortó, Gyula Fehér; Fourth official: Ádám Radványi

15 November 2008 15	Vasas	1–1	Nyíregyháza	Budapest
18:00 CET (UTC+1)	N. Németh 9'; Paripović (yellow card) 17'; Laczkó (yellow card) 42'	Report	Ramos (yellow card) 37'; Odrobéna (yellow card) 85', (goal) 89'	Stadium: Illovszky Rudolf Stadion; Attendance: 3,300; Referee: Mihály Fábián; Assistant referees: Zoltán Pápai, János Demeter; Fourth official: Róbert Nagy

22 February 2009 16	Nyíregyháza	1–3	Újpest	Nyíregyháza
17:30 CET (UTC+1)	Apostu 4', (yellow card) 56'; Imedashvili (yellow card) 68'	Report	Kabát 25'; Dudić (yellow card) 30'; Božić (yellow card) 31'; Korcsmár (yellow card) 39'; Mijadinoski (yellow card) 63', (goal) 66'; Rajczi 83'	Stadium: Városi Stadion; Attendance: 3,500; Referee: Zoltán Iványi; Assistant referees: István Albert, János Medovarszki; Fourth official: Gábor Fajkusz

7 March 2009 18	Nyíregyháza	0–2	Haladás	Nyíregyháza
18:00 CET (UTC+1)	Perenyi (yellow card) 43'; Goia (red card) 75'; Mboussi (red card) 90+2'	Report	N. Sipos 53'; Kenesei 76' (pen.); Andorka (yellow card) 86'	Stadium: Városi Stadion; Attendance: 2,000; Referee: Viktor Kassai; Assistant referees: Gábor Erős, Tibor Vámos; Fourth official: Gergely Szőts

14 March 2009 19	Debrecen	4–0	Nyíregyháza	Debrecen
15:00 CET (UTC+1)	Rudolf 13', 71', (yellow card) 70'; L. Oláh 48'; Czvitkovics (yellow card) 57'; Dudu 88'	Report	Minczér (yellow card) 15'; Zabos (yellow card) 37'; Cornaci (yellow card) 55'; Stojkov (yellow card) 66'; T. Hegedűs (yellow card) 67'; Imedashvili (yellow card) 86'	Stadium: Oláh Gábor utcai Stadion; Attendance: 7,500; Referee: Sándor Andó-Szabó; Assistant referees: Balázs Farkas, Zsolt Butkai; Fourth official: Balázs Böcskei

21 March 2009 20	Nyíregyháza	3–3	Kecskemét	Nyíregyháza
18:00 CET (UTC+1)	Imedashvili 7', (yellow card) 47'; Apostu 11'; Minczér (yellow card) 40'; Odrobéna (red card) 47'; Miskolczi (yellow card) 83', (goal) 88'	Report	Montvai 22', 90+2', (yellow card) 79'; Némedi (yellow card) 36'; Gyagya (yellow card) 38'; Mbengono 48'; Schindler (yellow card) 87'	Stadium: Városi Stadion; Attendance: 1,500; Referee: Zsolt Szabó; Assistant referees: Róbert Kispál, Péter Berettyán; Fourth official: Gyöngyi Gaál

4 April 2009 21	Rákospalota	1–1	Nyíregyháza	Budapest
19:00 CEST (UTC+2)	B. Kovács (yellow card) 19'; Pomper 26'; Szántai (yellow card) 29'; Kőhalmi (yellow card) 57'; Dancs (yellow card) 81'; Z. Pintér (yellow card) 88'	Report	Perenyi (yellow card) 38'; Goia (yellow card) 52'; T. Hegedűs 73', (yellow card) 83'	Stadium: Budai II. László Stadion; Attendance: 600; Referee: Tamás Bognár; Assistant referees: Zoltán Kovács, Balázs Huszár; Fourth official: Csaba Pintér

11 April 2009 22	Nyíregyháza	0–1	Kaposvár	Nyíregyháza
19:00 CEST (UTC+2)	T. Hegedűs (yellow card) 37'; Ramos (yellow card) 87'	Report	Nikolić 27'; Bogdán (yellow card) 31'; Zsolnai (yellow card) 67'	Stadium: Városi Stadion; Attendance: 2,000; Referee: István Vad; Assistant referees: Dr. Zsolt Varga, János Demeter; Fourth official: Gergő Janitz

18 April 2009 23	Honvéd	1–0	Nyíregyháza	Budapest
19:00 CEST (UTC+2)	Angoua (yellow card) 55'; Guié 58'; Stojaković (yellow card) 84'	Report	Ramos (yellow card) 23'; Imedashvili (yellow card) 27'; Odrobéna (yellow card) 57'; Perenyi (yellow card) 72'; Mboussi (yellow card) 75'; Dosso (yellow card) 76'	Stadium: Bozsik József Stadion; Attendance: 1,500; Referee: Roland Veizer; Assistant referees: Attila Kelemen, Róbert Horváth; Fourth official: Gábor Oláh

25 April 2009 24	Nyíregyháza	0–0	MTK	Nyíregyháza
19:00 CEST (UTC+2)	Zabos (yellow card) 22'; Mboussi (red card) 74'	Report	G. Nagy (yellow card) 29'; Melczer (yellow card) 55'	Stadium: Városi Stadion; Attendance: 5,000; Referee: Ferenc Bede; Assistant referees: Tibor Vámos, Gyula Ortó; Fourth official: Gergő Janitz

28 April 2009 25	Diósgyőr	1–0	Nyíregyháza	Miskolc
19:00 CEST (UTC+2)	Lippai 23', (yellow card) 77'	Report	Miskolczi (yellow card) 52'	Stadium: Diósgyőri Stadion; Attendance: 6,000; Referee: Tamás Arany; Assistant referees: László Viszokai, István Tóth; Fourth official: J. Zoltán Kovács

1 May 2009 26	Nyíregyháza	2–2	Paks	Nyíregyháza
19:00 CEST (UTC+2)	Lăzăreanu (yellow card) 52'; Imedashvili (yellow card) 65'; Miskolczi 82'; Fekete 86'	Report	Heffler (yellow card) 14'; Tököli 53', 71'; Nikolov (yellow card) 82'	Stadium: Városi Stadion; Attendance: 2,000; Referee: Szabolcs Szilasi; Assistant referees: Balázs Farkas, Zoltán Szalai; Fourth official: Gábor Oláh

5 May 2009 17	Siófok	3–1	Nyíregyháza	Siófok
19:00 CEST (UTC+2)	Sütő 4'; Ivancsics 38'; Magasföldi 41', (yellow card) 56'	Report	Miskolczi (yellow card) 45'; Perenyi (yellow card) 73'; Stojkov 83'	Stadium: Révész Géza utcai Stadion; Attendance: 300; Referee: Ádám Farkas; Assistant referees: Attila Kelemen, Gyula Fehér; Fourth official: László Varga
Note: The matches of the 17th round were postponed due to HFF decision.

9 May 2009 27	Zalaegerszeg	2–0	Nyíregyháza	Zalaegerszeg
19:00 CEST (UTC+2)	An. Horváth I (yellow card) 27'; Waltner 43', 54'; Miljatovič (yellow card) 78'	Report	I. Lakatos (yellow card) 8'; Ramos (yellow card) 53'; T. Hegedűs (yellow card) 69'; Zabos (yellow card) 75'; D. Oláh (yellow card) 79'; Minczér (yellow card) 81'; Miskolczi (yellow card) 82'	Stadium: ZTE Arena; Attendance: 3,785; Referee: István Vad; Assistant referees: Oszkár Lémon, Zoltán Kovács; Fourth official: Gergő Janitz

16 May 2009 28	Nyíregyháza	1–1	Győr	Nyíregyháza
19:00 CEST (UTC+2)	Minczér 68', (yellow card) 85'; Zabos (yellow card) 74'	Report	Đorđević (yellow card) 12'; Böőr (yellow card) 20'; Nyári (yellow card) 30'; Zámbó (yellow card) 43'; Csermelyi 61'	Stadium: Városi Stadion; Attendance: 2,000; Referee: József Berger; Assistant referees: Attila Forgács, János Medovarszki; Fourth official: Gábor Fajkusz

23 May 2009 29	Fehérvár	2–0	Nyíregyháza	Székesfehérvár
19:00 CEST (UTC+2)	Sitku 15'; Silva (yellow card) 40', (goal) 75'; G. Horváth II (yellow card) 47'; Dvéri (yellow card) 81'	Report	Miskolczi (yellow card) 8'; D. Oláh (yellow card) 29'; B. Bakos (yellow card) 89'	Stadium: Sóstói Stadion; Attendance: 1,508; Referee: Mihály Fábián; Assistant referees: Gyula Ortó, János Demeter; Fourth official: Róbert Nagy

30 May 2009 30	Nyíregyháza	3–1	Vasas	Nyíregyháza
19:00 CEST (UTC+2)	Goia 8'; Odrobéna (yellow card) 50'; Stojkov 64', 66'	Report	Unierzyski (yellow card) 26'; Balog (yellow card) 48'; A. Tóth 52', (yellow card) 71'	Stadium: Városi Stadion; Attendance: 2,000; Referee: Ádám Németh; Assistant referees: Vencel Tóth II, Tamás Márkus; Fourth official: Gergő Janitz

=== Magyar Kupa ===
3 September 2008 Third round	Bőcs	1–0	Nyíregyháza	Bőcs
15:30 CEST (UTC+2)	Martis 2'; Cséke (yellow card) 87'	Report	Apostu (yellow card) 39'; Zabos (yellow card) 39'; Lippai (yellow card) 63'	Stadium: Szabadság utcai Stadion; Attendance: 500; Referee: Ádám Farkas; Assistant referees: Zoltán Szalai, Gábor Varga Jr.

=== Ligakupa ===
==== Group stage ====
Pos	Team	Pld	W	D	L	GF	GA	GD	Pts	Qualification	VAS	DIO	DEB	NYI	BOC	VAC
1	Vasas	10	6	3	1	31	14	+17	21	Advance to knockout phase	—	3–0	2–1	4–1	1–1	7–1
2	Diósgyőr	10	6	3	1	22	9	+13	21	Advance to knockout phase	2–2	—	4–1	3–1	5–0	4–1
3	Debrecen	10	3	3	4	22	19	+3	12		3–3	0–0	—	2–1	5–1	4–0
4	Nyíregyháza	10	3	2	5	19	18	+1	11		4–0	1–1	2–2	—	4–0	3–0
5	Bőcs	10	3	1	6	15	27	−12	10		1–5	0–1	3–2	2–0	—	5–0
6	Vác-Újbuda	10	3	0	7	13	35	−22	9		0–4	0–2	3–2	4–2	4–2	—

Source: HFF

1 October 2008 1	Nyíregyháza	3–0	Vác-Újbuda	Nyíregyháza
15:00 CEST (UTC+2)	Odrobéna (yellow card) 25'; Miskolczi 35'; Cornaci 42'; Dosso 72'	Report	T. Horváth (yellow card) 26'; C. Hegedűs (yellow card) 53'	Stadium: Városi Stadion; Attendance: 250; Referee: Ferenc Szöllősi; Assistant referees: Tibor Vígh, János Agócs

15 October 2008 2	Debrecen	2–1	Nyíregyháza	Debrecen
15:30 CEST (UTC+2)	Z. Takács 7'; Dudu 16'	Report	Shevel (yellow card) 32'; Lippai 58'; Zaleh (yellow card) 90+3'	Stadium: Oláh Gábor utcai Stadion; Attendance: 800; Referee: József Erdős; Assistant referees: Dr. Zsolt Varga, Gyula Ortó

29 October 2008 3	Nyíregyháza	1–1	Diósgyőr	Nyíregyháza
14:00 CET (UTC+1)	Odrobéna (yellow card) 22'; Apostu (yellow card) 36'; Ambrusz (yellow card) 61'; B. Bakos (yellow card) 74'	Report	P. Takács (yellow card) 37', (goal) 62' (pen.)	Stadium: Városi Stadion; Attendance: 500; Referee: Gábor Oláh; Assistant referees: Balázs Farkas, Zsolt Márton

5 November 2008 4	Bőcs	2–0	Nyíregyháza	Bőcs
13:30 CET (UTC+1)	Martis (yellow card) 18'; Jeney (yellow card) 20'; Menougong 59', 70'	Report	Lippai (yellow card) 38'; Ramos (yellow card) 78'	Stadium: Szabadság utcai Stadion; Attendance: 150; Referee: Gergő Király; Assistant referees: Gergő Janitz, Zsolt Butkai

12 November 2008 5	Vasas	4–1	Nyíregyháza	Budapest
16:00 CET (UTC+1)	Katona (yellow card) 12'; Laczkó 20'; Gyánó 36', 58'; Piller 47'	Report	Nánási (yellow card) 24'; N. Tóth II (yellow card) 58'; Fekete 75'; Szilágyi (yellow card) 81'	Stadium: Illovszky Rudolf Stadion; Attendance: 100; Referee: Zsolt Szabó; Assistant referees: Tibor Vámos, Balázs Farkas

22 November 2008 6	Vác-Újbuda	4–2	Nyíregyháza	Vác
13:00 CET (UTC+1)	P. Kovács 36', 45'; Rob 65'; C. Hegedűs 71'	Report	Goia 56'; Szilágyi 79'; Miskolczi (yellow card) 87'	Stadium: Ligeti Stadion; Attendance: 100; Referee: Tamás Arany; Assistant referees: J. Zoltán Kovács, László Viszokai

26 November 2008 7	Nyíregyháza	2–2	Debrecen	Nyíregyháza
13:00 CET (UTC+1)	Dosso 67'; Cornaci 83'	Report	Dudu 1'; Bogdanović 13'; Szatmári (yellow card) 29'; Z. Kiss I (yellow card) 34'	Stadium: Városi Stadion; Attendance: 200; Referee: László Varga; Assistant referees: Attila Kelemen, Gábor Varga Jr.

6 December 2008 8	Diósgyőr	3–1	Nyíregyháza	Miskolc
15:00 CET (UTC+1)	Mi. Tóth 32', 85'; Kamber 48'	Report	Nánási (yellow card) 7'; G. Tóth (yellow card) 51'; Lippai (yellow card) 53'; Goia (red card) 57'; G. Simon 68', (yellow card) 78'; Odrobéna (yellow card) 69'	Stadium: Diósgyőri Stadion; Attendance: 800; Referee: Ádám Farkas; Assistant referees: Tibor Vígh, István Tóth

7 February 2009 9	Nyíregyháza	4–0	Bőcs	Nyíregyháza
13:00 CET (UTC+1)	Stojkov 9', 70'; Mboussi (yellow card) 37', (goal) 78'; Apostu (yellow card) 64'; Lippai 80'	Report	Ur (yellow card) 32'	Stadium: Városi Stadion; Attendance: 500; Referee: Ádám Farkas; Assistant referees: Attila Kelemen, Gyula Fehér

11 February 2009 10	Nyíregyháza	4–0	Vasas	Nyíregyháza
13:00 CET (UTC+1)	Kertai 17'; Apostu 26', 27', 39'	Report	Borszéki (yellow card) 26'	Stadium: Városi Stadion; Attendance: 400; Referee: Tibor Gyarmati II; Assistant referees: Zoltán Szalai, Gábor Varga Jr.
