= 2008–09 Debreceni VSC season =

Debreceni VSC - TEVA
2008–09 season
- Chairman: (Hungary) Sándor Szilágyi
- Manager: (Hungary) András Herczeg
- Soproni Liga: 1st
- Hungarian Cup: Quarter-final
- Hungarian League Cup: Group stage
- UEFA Cup: Second qualifying round

The 2008–09 season was Debreceni VSC - TEVA's 16th competitive season, 16th consecutive season in the Soproni Liga and 106th year in existence as a football club.

== Team kit ==
The team kits for the 2008-09 season are produced by Adidas and the shirt sponsor is TEVA and Ave-Ásványvíz. The home kit is red colour and the away kit is white colour.

Home
Away

== Squad ==
=== First-team squad ===
Note: Flags indicate national team as defined under FIFA eligibility rules; some limited exceptions apply. Players may hold more than one non-FIFA nationality.

No.	Pos.	Nation	Player
1	GK	MNE	Vukašin Poleksić
2	DF	HUN	István Szűcs
3	DF	HUN	Csaba Szatmári
3	DF	SRB	Božidar Ćosić
4	MF	HUN	Leandro de Almeida
6	DF	HUN	Zoltán Takács
7	MF	HUN	Tibor Dombi (vice-captain)
8	FW	HUN	Zsombor Kerekes
9	MF	HUN	Tamás Sándor
10	FW	SRB	Igor Bogdanović
12	GK	SRB	Đorđe Pantić
13	DF	HUN	Péter Bíró
14	FW	HUN	Gergely Rudolf
15	MF	HUN	László Rezes
16	DF	HUN	Ádám Komlósi
17	DF	HUN	Norbert Mészáros
18	DF	HUN	Péter Máté
19	FW	BRA	Vinicius Galvão Leal

No.	Pos.	Nation	Player
21	DF	HUN	Marcell Fodor
22	DF	HUN	Csaba Bernáth (vice-captain)
23	FW	HUN	Péter Szilágyi
24	GK	HUN	Norbert Csernyánszki
26	FW	CRO	Mate Eterovic
27	MF	HUN	Gábor Demjén
28	DF	HUN	Zoltán Nagy
29	MF	HUN	István Spitzmüller
30	MF	HUN	Zoltán Kiss (captain)
33	MF	HUN	József Varga
41	FW	HUN	Lóránt Oláh
55	MF	HUN	Péter Szakály
77	MF	HUN	Péter Czvitkovics
81	MF	HUN	Attila Katona
83	MF	HUN	Zoltán Varga
87	GK	HUN	István Verpecz
88	MF	HUN	Tamás Huszák
99	FW	NGA	Omagbemi Dudu

== Competitions ==
=== Nemzeti Bajnokság I ===
==== League table ====
Pos	Team	Pld	W	D	L	GF	GA	GD	Pts	Qualification or relegation
1	Debrecen (C)	30	21	5	4	70	29	+41	68	Qualification for Champions League second qualifying round
2	Újpest	30	17	8	5	61	38	+23	59	Qualification for Europa League second qualifying round
3	Haladás	30	16	5	9	44	29	+15	53	Qualification for Europa League first qualifying round
4	Zalaegerszeg	30	15	7	8	52	44	+8	52	
5	Kecskemét	30	14	6	10	55	44	+11	48	

Source: soccerway.com
Rules for classification: 1st points; 2nd overall wins; 3rd goal difference; 4th goals scored
(C) Champions

==== Results summary ====
Overall								Home						Away					
Pld	W	D	L	GF	GA	GD	Pts	W	D	L	GF	GA	GD	W	D	L	GF	GA	GD
30	21	5	4	70	29	+41	68	10	4	1	43	17	+26	11	1	3	27	12	+15

Last updated: 30 May 2009.
Source: Soproni Liga

==== Results by round ====
Round	1	2	3	4	5	6	7	8	9	10	11	12	13	14	15	16	17	18	19	20	21	22	23	24	25	26	27	28	29	30
Ground	A	H	A	H	A	H	A	H	A	H	A	A	H	A	H	H	A	H	A	H	A	H	A	H	A	H	H	A	H	A
Result	W	W	W	D	D	W	D	W	L	W	W	W	W	L	W	L	D	W	W	L	W	W	W	W	W	W	W	D	W	W
Position	4	1	1	1	2	1	3	2	4	2	1	1	1	1	1	1	2	2	2	2	2	2	2	2	1	1	1	1	1	1

Updated to match(es) played on 30 May 2009. Source: Matches
A = Away; H = Home; W = Win; D = Draw; L = Loss

==== Matches ====
26 July 2008 1	Debreceni VSC	2–1	Zalaegerszegi TE	Debrecen
15:00 CEST	Rudolf 38' (pen.), 66'; Bernáth (yellow card) 69'; Czvitkovics (yellow card) 76'	Report	Waltner 21' (pen.) (yellow card) 51'; Trnavac (yellow card) 38'	Stadium: Stadion Oláh Gábor Út; Attendance: 4,500; Referee: Viktor Kassai

4 August 2008 2	Győri ETO FC	0–3	Debreceni VSC	Győr
20:00 CEST	Nikolov (yellow card) 61'; Völgyi (red card) 79'	Report	L. Oláh 23'; I. Szűcs 29', 42'	Stadium: Stadion ETO; Attendance: 1,500; Referee: Tamás Bognár

10 August 2008 3	Debreceni VSC	1–0	FC Fehérvár	Debrecen
20:00 CEST	L. Oláh 32'; Czvitkovics (yellow card) 52'; Z. Takács (yellow card) 90'	Report	Mohl (yellow card) 6'; Dvéri (yellow card) 17'; Andić (yellow card) 70'; B. Farkas (yellow card) 86'	Stadium: Stadion Oláh Gábor Út; Attendance: 5,000; Referee: Mihály Fábián

17 August 2008 4	Nyíregyháza Spartacus	1–1	Debreceni VSC	Nyíregyháza
20:00 CEST	Miskolczi (yellow card) 43'; Mboussi (yellow card) 45'; Apostu 50'; Minczér (yellow card) 53'; Goia (yellow card) 72'	Report	Leandro 28'; Bernáth (yellow card) 41'; Z. Takács (yellow card) 48'; I. Szűcs (yellow card) 54'	Stadium: Városi Stadion; Attendance: 7,000; Referee: Zsolt Szabó

23 August 2008 5	Debreceni VSC	1–1	Újpest FC	Debrecen
20:00 CEST	Zs. Kerekes (yellow card) 60'; I. Szűcs (yellow card) 63'; L. Oláh 77'	Report	A. Simon 71'	Stadium: Stadion Oláh Gábor Út; Attendance: 7,500; Referee: István Mészáros

31 August 2008 6	BFC Siófok	0–4	Debreceni VSC	Siófok
20:00 CEST	R. Lipcsei (yellow card) 59'; Basara (yellow card) 92'	Report	Leandro 4'; P. Bíró 33'; P. Szakály 51'; Rudolf 62'	Stadium: Révesz Géza Stadion; Attendance: 1,000; Referee: István Vad

12 September 2008 7	Debreceni VSC	2–2	Szombathelyi Haladás	Debrecen
19:00 CEST	Rudolf 18' (yellow card) 49'; Mészáros (yellow card) 53'; L. Oláh 80'; Leandro (yellow card) 90+2'	Report	P. Tóth 59'; Z.Takács 86' (o.g.); Zs. Kovács (yellow card) 90+2'	Stadium: Stadion Oláh Gábor Út; Attendance: 4,500; Referee: Ferenc Bede

20 September 2008 8	Debreceni VSC	4–1	Vasas SC	Debrecen
15:00 CEST	Z. Takács (yellow card) 37'; Poleksić (yellow card) 54'; L. Oláh 60', 67'; Dudu 72'; P. Szakály 80'	Report	Paripović (yellow card) 21'; Dobrić 26' (yellow card) 74'; Pavićević (yellow card) 45'; N. Németh (yellow card) 69'; Piller (yellow card) 86'	Stadium: Stadion Oláh Gábor Út; Attendance: 4,500; Referee: Péter Solymosi

26 September 2008 9	Kecskeméti TE	3–0	Debreceni VSC	Kecskemét
19:00 CEST	Koncz (yellow card) 1'; Schindler (yellow card) 9'; Montvai 15'; Yannick 44'; Csordás 68'	Report	Leandro (yellow card) 52'; Komlósi (yellow card) 57'	Stadium: Széktói Stadion; Attendance: 5,500; Referee: Sándor Andó-Szabó

4 October 2008 10	Debreceni VSC	6–2	Rákospalotai EAC	Debrecen
18:00 CEST	P. Szakály 7'; Z. Takács (yellow card) 20'; L. Oláh 36'; Rudolf 44' (pen.); Pomper 56' (o.g.); Z. Kiss 62'; Komlósi (yellow card) 81'; Zs. Kerekes 90+2'	Report	Jeremiás 18', 64'; K. Erős (yellow card) 29'; Cseri (yellow card) 43'	Stadium: Stadion Oláh Gábor Út; Attendance: 3,000; Referee: János Takács

18 October 2008 11	Kaposvári Rákóczi FC	0–1	Debreceni VSC	Kaposvár
18:00 CEST	Grúz (yellow card) 21'; Božović (yellow card) 45'	Report	Rudolf 30'; Z. Kiss (yellow card) 59'; Dombi (yellow card) 81'	Stadium: Stadion Kaposvár Rákóczi; Attendance: 3,500; Referee: István Vad

24 October 2008 12	Debreceni VSC	4–1	Budapest Honvéd FC	Debrecen
19:00 CEST	Rudolf 2'; L. Oláh 41'; P. Szakály 58', 61'	Report	Maróti (yellow card) 13'; Benjamin (yellow card) 25'; Genito (yellow card) 40'; Moreira 59'; Z. Vincze (yellow card) 75'	Stadium: Stadion Oláh Gábor Út; Attendance: 3,500; Referee: Zoltán Iványi

2 November 2008 13	MTK Budapest FC	0–1	Debreceni VSC	Budapest
17:30 CEST	Zsidai (yellow card) 11'; Melczer (yellow card) 34'; Rodenbücher (red card) 89'	Report	Z. Takács (yellow card) 45'; Leandro (yellow card) 76'; Z. Kiss 84'	Stadium: Stadion Hidegkuti Nándor; Attendance: 1,000; Referee: Mihály Fábián

8 November 2008 14	Debreceni VSC	1–2	Diósgyőri VTK	Debrecen
18:00 CEST	Leandro (yellow card) 11'; Rudolf 32'	Report	M. Tóth (yellow card) 13' (goal) 70'; P. Takács 64' (pen.)	Stadium: Stadion Oláh Gábor Út; Attendance: 5,000; Referee: Ádám Németh

14 November 2008 15	Paksi SE	0–2	Debreceni VSC	Paks
19:00 CEST	Pandur (yellow card) 38'	Report	Rudolf 20'; P. Szakály 39'; Komlósi (yellow card) 49'	Stadium: Stadion PSE; Attendance: 1,500; Referee: Viktor Kassai

8 April 2009 16	Zalaegerszegi TE	2–1	Debreceni VSC	Zalaegerszeg
17:00 CEST	Gy. Illés 32'; Waltner (yellow card) 35'; D. Pavićević 61'; Sluka (yellow card) 90'; Miljatovič (yellow card) 90+3'	Report	J. Varga (yellow card) 23'; Leandro (yellow card) 37'; Dudu 39' (yellow card) 90+3'; Bernáth (yellow card) 77'	Stadium: ZTE Arena; Attendance: 5,382; Referee: Zsolt Szabó

6 May 2009 17	Debreceni VSC	2–2	Győri ETO FC	Debrecen
19:00 CEST	Czvitkovics 7' (yellow card) 36'; Bernáth (red card) 36'; P. Szakály 72'; Dombi (yellow card) 90'	Report	Aleksidze 27'; Józsi (yellow card) 52'; Bicak (yellow card) 56'; Supić (yellow card) 89'; Böőr 90+1'	Stadium: Stadion Oláh Gábor Út; Attendance: 6,000; Referee: Mihály Fábián

6 March 2009 18	FC Fehérvár	0–1	Debreceni VSC	Székesfehérvár
19:00 CEST	Radović (yellow card) 36'; Sifter (yellow card) 73'; D. Nagy (yellow card) 74'; B. Farkas (red card) 75'; G. Horváth (red card) 90+1'	Report	Demjén 15'; Z. Kiss (yellow card) 56'	Stadium: Stadion Sóstói; Attendance: 2,000; Referee: István Vad

14 March 2009 19	Debreceni VSC	4–0	Nyíregyháza Spartacus	Debrecen
15:00 CEST	Rudolf 13', 71' (yellow card) 70'; L. Oláh 48'; Czvitkovics (yellow card) 57'; Dudu 88'	Report	Minczér (yellow card) 15'; Zabos (yellow card) 37'; Cornaci (yellow card) 55'; Stojkov (yellow card) 66'; T. Hegedűs (yellow card) 67'; Imedashvili (yellow card) 86'	Stadium: Stadion Oláh Gábor Út; Attendance: 4,500; Referee: Sándor Andó-Szabó

20 March 2009 20	Újpest FC	2–0	Debreceni VSC	Budapest
19:00 CEST	Kabát 7'; Rajczi 58' (yellow card) 75'; Pollák (yellow card) 73'; Foxi (yellow card) 78'	Report	Komlósi (yellow card) 51'	Stadium: Szusza Ferenc Stadium; Attendance: 10,265; Referee: Viktor Kassai

4 April 2009 21	Debreceni VSC	5–1	BFC Siófok	Debrecen
19:00 CEST	L. Oláh 16' (pen.), 77'; N. Mészáros 37'; Dudu 44'; Vinicius 85'	Report	Sz. Kanta (yellow card) 31'; Gy. Hegedűs (yellow card) 36'; Eugene (yellow card) 40'; Magasföldi 43'; Sütő (red card) 84'	Stadium: Stadion Oláh Gábor Út; Attendance: 4,000; Referee: János Takács

11 April 2009 22	Szombathelyi Haladás	1–2	Debreceni VSC	Szombathely
15:00 CEST	Kenesei 60'; B. Molnár (yellow card) 83'	Report	Czvitkovics 32', 64' (pen.); Komlósi (yellow card) 75'	Stadium: Rohonci úti Stadion; Attendance: 6,000; Referee: Péter Solymosi

19 April 2009 23	Vasas SC	1–3	Debreceni VSC	Budapest
17:30 CEST	B. Tóth 54'; Laczkó (yellow card) 80'; Unierzyski (yellow card) 82'	Report	Rudolf 16', 33'; Bernáth (yellow card) 53'; P. Szilágyi 70'	Stadium: Stadion Rudolf Illovszky; Attendance: 2,000; Referee: Sándor Andó-Szabó

25 April 2009 24	Debreceni VSC	3–1	Kecskeméti TE	Debrecen
15:00 CEST	L. Oláh 22'; Dombi (yellow card) 62' (goal) 86'; Leandro 73'	Report	Litsingi (yellow card) 29' (goal) 36'; Mitrović (red card) 33'; Velimirović (yellow card) 71'; Koncz (yellow card) 86'	Stadium: Stadion Oláh Gábor Út; Attendance: 4,000; Referee: István Vad

28 April 2009 25	Rákospalotai EAC	0–4	Debreceni VSC	Budapest
19:00 CEST	K. Erős (yellow card) 58'	Report	Czvitkovics 4'; Rudolf 19'; P. Szilágyi 55'; Leandro 59'; Rezes (yellow card) 65'	Stadium: Stadion Budai II. Laszló; Attendance: 300; Referee: Ádám Farkas

1 May 2009 26	Debreceni VSC	4–1	Kaposvári Rákóczi FC	Debrecen
19:00 CEST	Czvitkovics 17'; N. Mészáros 22'; P. Szakály 30'; Rudolf 70'	Report	Zsolnai 75'	Stadium: Stadion Oláh Gábor Út; Attendance: 4,000; Referee: Tamás Arany

9 May 2009 27	Budapest Honvéd FC	0–1	Debreceni VSC	Budapest
15:00 CEST	Á. Takács (yellow card) 6'; Maróti (red card) 90+2'	Report	P. Szakály (yellow card) 55' (goal) 59'; Rudolf (yellow card) 85'; Z. Nagy (yellow card) 90'	Stadium: Bozsik Stadion; Attendance: 1,500; Referee: József Berger

17 May 2009 28	Debreceni VSC	2–2	MTK Budapest FC	Debrecen
17:30 CEST	Leandro 57'; N. Mészáros 82'; J. Varga (yellow card) 84'; Vinicius (yellow card) 90+2'	Report	Könyves (yellow card) 17'; Pátkai 71'; Rodenbücher (yellow card) 79'; Lambulić (yellow card) 81'; Hrepka (yellow card) 90+2'; A. Szekeres 90+3'	Stadium: Stadion Oláh Gábor Út; Attendance: 7,000; Referee: Zsolt Szabó

22 May 2009 29	Diósgyőri VTK	2–3	Debreceni VSC	Győr
19:00 CEST	Visković (yellow card) 19'; Ahodikpe (yellow card) 40'; Bogunović (yellow card) 58'; Homma 62'; Balajti 80'	Report	Czvitkovics 48', 52'; Vinicius (yellow card) 58'; Dombi 70'	Stadium: DVTK Stadion; Attendance: 5,000; Referee: Péter Solymosi

30 May 2009 30	Debreceni VSC	2–0	Paksi SE	Debrecen
15:00 CEST	Poleksić 45' (pen.); Rudolf 69' (pen.)	Report	Zováth (yellow card) 24'; Böde (yellow card) 64'; Tamási (yellow card) 71'	Stadium: Stadion Oláh Gábor Út; Attendance: 5,000; Referee: Sándor Andó-Szabó

=== Hungarian Cup ===
17 September 2008 4	Algyő SK	1–10	Debreceni VSC	Algyő
15:30 CEST	Végh (yellow card) 5'; L. Tóth (yellow card) 12'; Gyimesi 14'; Krajczár (yellow card) 80'	Report	Zs. Kerekes 3', 13'; Dudu 6', 45', 55', 56'; Z. Nagy (yellow card) 16'; Z. Varga 43'; Bogdanović 61', 72', 85'	Stadium: Városi Spottelep; Attendance: 600; Referee: Gergely Szőts

8 October 2008 Round of 16 (1st leg)	FC Fehérvár	2–1	Debreceni VSC	Székesfehérvár
20:45 CEST	Vujović (yellow card) 47' (goal) 62', 79'; G. Horváth (red card) 89'	Report	Csernyánszki (red card) 20'; Leandro 65'; Dombi (yellow card) 87'; Dudu (red card) 90'	Stadium: Stadion Sóstói; Attendance: 800; Referee: Zsolt Szabó

21 October 2008 Round of 16 (2nd leg)	Debreceni VSC	1–0 (2(a)–2 agg.)	FC Fehérvár	Debrecen
18:00 CEST	Komlósi 39'	Report	Mohl (yellow card) 72'; Koller (red card) 90+1'	Stadium: Stadion Oláh Gábor Út; Attendance: 4,000; Referee: Viktor Kassai

10 March 2009 Quarter-final (1st leg)	BFC Siófok	2–0	Debreceni VSC	Siófok
16:00 CEST	Magasföldi 20' (yellow card) 80'; Sz. Kanta (yellow card) 20'; Ivancsics 57'	Report	Hugo (yellow card) 31'; Huszák (yellow card) 43'	Stadium: Révesz Géza Stadion; Attendance: 150; Referee: Ádám Németh

17 March 2009 Quarter-final (2nd leg)	Debreceni VSC	1–1 (1–3 agg.)	BFC Siófok	Debrecen
17:00 CEST	Huszák (yellow card) 6'; Leandro (yellow card) 39'; Dudu 49'	Report	Ndjodo (yellow card) 11'; Gy. Hegedűs (yellow card) 20'; Magasföldi (yellow card) 25'; Ivancsics 45' (pen.); Sütő (yellow card) 57'; Koós (yellow card) 88'	Stadium: Stadion Oláh Gábor Út; Attendance: 1,500; Referee: Ferenc Bede

=== League Cup ===
==== Group stage ====
1 October 2008 1	Diósgyőri VTK	4–1	Debreceni VSC	Miskolc
18:00 CEST	Tchana 5'; Szélpál 22'; Sz. Horváth 36'; V. Szabó 66'	Report	Zs. Kerekes 29'; Poledica (yellow card) 43'	Stadium: DVTK Stadion; Attendance: 800; Referee: László Varga

15 October 2008 2	Debreceni VSC	2–1	Nyíregyháza Spartacus	Debrecen
15:30 CEST	Z. Takács 7'; Dudu 16'	Report	Shevel (yellow card) 32'; Lippai 58'; Zaleh (yellow card) 90+3'	Stadium: Stadion Oláh Gábor Út; Attendance: 800; Referee: József Erdős

29 October 2008 3	Vasas SC	2–1	Debreceni VSC	Budapest
16:00 CEST	Gyánó 44'; B. Tóth 76'; Laczkó (yellow card) 87'	Report	Á. Németh (yellow card) 18'; Dudu (yellow card) 40'; P. Szilágyi 67'; Spitzmüller (yellow card) 77'	Stadium: Stadion Rudolf Illovszky; Attendance: 100; Referee: Ádám Farkas

5 November 2008 4	Debreceni VSC	4–0	Vác-Újbuda LTC	Debrecen
13:30 CEST	Czvitkovics 16'; Z. Takács 33'; Dudu 35'; Vinicius 67'	Report	Cs. Hegedűs (yellow card) 32'	Stadium: Stadion Oláh Gábor Út; Attendance: 500; Referee: Gábor Fajkusz

12 November 2008 5	Bőcs KSC	3–2	Debreceni VSC	Bőcs
13:30 CEST	A. Török (yellow card) 45'; Irhás (yellow card) 56'; L. Vass 68'; George 72'; Zs. Molnár 84'	Report	Bogdanović 58', 65'	Stadium: Városi Sporttelep; Attendance: 200; Referee: János Takács

22 November 2008 6	Debreceni VSC	0–0	Diósgyőri VTK	Debrecen
13:30 CEST	J. Varga (yellow card) 10'; Z. Takács (yellow card) 52'	Report	Bokros (yellow card) 48'; Menyhért (yellow card) 90+2'	Stadium: Stadion Oláh Gábor Út; Attendance: 600; Referee: Zoltán Iványi

26 November 2008 7	Nyíregyháza Spartacus	2–2	Debreceni VSC	Nyíregyháza
13:00 CEST	Dosso 67'; Cornaci 83'	Report	Dudu 1'; Bogdanović 13'; Szatmári (yellow card) 29'; Z. Kiss (yellow card) 34'	Stadium: Városi Stadion; Attendance: 200; Referee: László Varga

3 December 2008 8	Debreceni VSC	3–3	Vasas SC	Debrecen
13:00 CEST	Dudu 24', 60'; Bogdanović 25'	Report	Papucsek 2' (yellow card) 56'; Laczkó 17'; A. Tóth 65'	Stadium: Stadion Oláh Gábor Út; Attendance: 100; Referee: Sándor Andó-Szabó

7 February 2009 9	Vác-Újbuda LTC	3–2	Debreceni VSC	Vác
14:00 CEST	L. Fekete 25'; Rob 30'; Rusvay 65' (yellow card) 69'; Margitics (yellow card) 80'; Sztankó (yellow card) 89'	Report	Kardos (yellow card) 30'; Lucas (yellow card) 73' (goal) 84'; Faggyas 89'	Stadium: Városi Stadion; Attendance: 100; Referee: Gyöngyi Gaál

14 February 2009 10	Debreceni VSC	5–1	Bőcs KSC	Debrecen
14:30 CEST	Dudu 44', 65', 85', 90'; Vinicius 88'	Report	Martis 29' (yellow card) 80'; Cséke (yellow card) 35'; Ur (yellow card) 43'; Jeney (yellow card) 46'; Póti (yellow card) 71'	Stadium: Stadion Oláh Gábor Út; Attendance: 100; Referee: Gábor Fajkusz

===== Classification =====
Pos	Team	Pld	W	D	L	GF	GA	GD	Pts	Qualification
1	Vasas	10	6	3	1	31	14	+17	21	Advance to knockout phase
2	Diósgyőr	10	6	3	1	22	9	+13	21	Advance to knockout phase
3	Debrecen	10	3	3	4	22	19	+3	12	
4	Nyíregyháza	10	3	2	5	19	18	+1	11	
5	Bőcs	10	3	1	6	15	27	−12	10	
6	Vác-Újbuda	10	3	0	7	13	35	−22	9	

Source: HFF

=== UEFA Cup ===
==== Qualifying rounds ====
17 July 2008 Q1 Leg 1	FC Shakhter Karagandy (Kazakhstan)	1–1	(Hungary) Debreceni VSC	Karagandy
14:00 CEST	Perić 63'	Report	Dombi (yellow card) 10'; Szűcs (yellow card) 53'; Rudolf 61' (yellow card) 64'	Stadium: Shakhtyor Stadium; Attendance: 6,000; Referee: (Turkey) Hüseyin Göçek

31 July 2008 Q1 Leg 2	Debreceni VSC (Hungary)	1–0 (2–1 agg.)	(Kazakhstan) FC Shakhter Karagandy	Debrecen
20:00 CEST	Bernáth (yellow card) 2'; Huszák (yellow card) 38'; Rudolf 38'; Z. Takács (yellow card) 74'	Report	Glushko (yellow card) 58'; Samchenko (yellow card) 62'; Perić (yellow card) 82'	Stadium: Stadion Oláh Gábor Út; Attendance: 7,000; Referee: (Denmark) Lars Christoffersen

14 August 2008 Q2 Leg 1	BSC Young Boys (Switzerland)	4–1	(Hungary) Debreceni VSC	Bern
19:30 CEST	M. Schneuwly 41', 77'; Regazzoni 68', 87'; Varela (yellow card) 76'	Report	Rudolf 17' (yellow card) 67'	Stadium: Wankdorf; Attendance: 6,500; Referee: (Denmark) Peter Rasmussen

28 August 2008 Q2 Leg 2	Debreceni VSC (Hungary)	2–3 (3–7 agg.)	(Switzerland) BSC Young Boys	Debrecen
20:00 CEST	L. Oláh 42'; Dudu 73'	Report	M. Schneuwly 33'; Regazzoni 56'; Yapi 67'; Kulaksızoğlu (yellow card) 86'; Varela (yellow card) 87'	Stadium: Stadion Oláh Gábor Út; Attendance: 6,000; Referee: (Georgia (country)) Levan Paniashvili

== Statistics ==
=== Appearances and goals ===
Last updated on 30 May 2009.

No.	Pos	Nat	Player	Total		Soproni Liga		UEFA Cup		Hungarian Cup		League Cup	
No.	Pos	Nat	Player	Apps	Goals	Apps	Goals	Apps	Goals	Apps	Goals	Apps	Goals
1	GK	(Montenegro) MNE	Vukašin Poleksić	34	-37	29	-28/1	3	-7	2	-2	0	0
2	DF	(Hungary) HUN	István Szűcs	9	2	5	2	3	0	1	0	0	0
3	DF	(Hungary) HUN	Csaba Szatmári	2	0	1	0	0	0	1	0	0	0
3	DF	(Serbia) SRB	Božidar Ćosić	3	0	1	0	0	0	2	0	0	0
4	MF	(Hungary) HUN	Leandro de Almeida	36	6	29	5	4	0	3	1	0	0
6	DF	(Hungary) HUN	Zoltán Takács	20	0	14	0	4	0	2	0	0	0
7	MF	(Hungary) HUN	Tibor Dombi	34	2	26	2	3	0	5	0	0	0
8	FW	(Hungary) HUN	Zsombor Kerekes	17	3	9	1	3	0	5	2	0	0
9	MF	(Hungary) HUN	Tamás Sándor	6	0	4	0	0	0	2	0	0	0
10	FW	(Serbia) SRB	Igor Bogdanović	5	3	0	0	1	0	4	3	0	0
12	GK	(Serbia) SRB	Đorđe Pantić	2	-1	1	0	0	0	1	-1	0	0
13	DF	(Hungary) HUN	Péter Bíró	9	1	7	1	1	0	1	0	0	0
14	FW	(Hungary) HUN	Gergely Rudolf	29	19	26	16	3	3	0	0	0	0
15	MF	(Hungary) HUN	László Rezes	5	0	5	0	0	0	0	0	0	0
16	DF	(Hungary) HUN	Ádám Komlósi	18	1	14	0	2	0	2	1	0	0
17	DF	(Hungary) HUN	Norbert Mészáros	32	3	26	3	3	0	3	0	0	0
19	FW	(Brazil) BRA	Vinicius Galvão Leal	6	1	6	1	0	0	0	0	0	0
21	DF	(Hungary) HUN	Marcell Fodor	10	0	10	0	0	0	0	0	0	0
22	DF	(Hungary) HUN	Csaba Bernáth	32	0	27	0	4	0	1	0	0	0
23	FW	(Hungary) HUN	Péter Szilágyi	6	2	6	2	0	0	0	0	0	0
26	FW	(Croatia) CRO	Mate Eterovic	1	0	0	0	1	0	0	0	0	0
24	GK	(Hungary) HUN	Norbert Csernyánszki	4	-3	1	-1	1	-1	2	-1	0	0
27	MF	(Hungary) HUN	Gábor Demjén	26	1	20	1	2	0	4	0	0	0
28	DF	(Hungary) HUN	Zoltán Nagy	7	0	3	0	0	0	4	0	0	0
29	MF	(Hungary) HUN	István Spitzmüller	1	0	1	0	0	0	0	0	0	0
29	MF	(Hungary) HUN	Dávid Nagy	1	0	0	0	0	0	1	0	0	0
30	MF	(Hungary) HUN	Zoltán Kiss	26	2	21	2	4	0	1	0	0	0
33	MF	(Hungary) HUN	József Varga	20	0	20	0	0	0	0	0	0	0
41	FW	(Hungary) HUN	Lóránt Oláh	31	13	26	12	2	1	3	0	0	0
55	MF	(Hungary) HUN	Péter Szakály	32	9	27	9	1	0	4	0	0	0
57	DF	(Brazil) BRA	Hugo Nascimento	2	0	0	0	0	0	2	0	0	0
77	MF	(Hungary) HUN	Péter Czvitkovics	32	7	24	7	4	0	4	0	0	0
81	MF	(Hungary) HUN	Attila Katona	11	0	10	0	0	0	1	0	0	0
83	DF	(Hungary) HUN	Zoltán Varga	8	1	5	0	2	0	1	1	0	0
87	GK	(Hungary) HUN	István Verpecz	1	-2	0	0	0	0	1	-2	0	0
88	MF	(Hungary) HUN	Tamás Huszák	7	0	1	0	2	0	4	0	0	0
99	FW	(Nigeria) NGA	Omagbemi Dudu	16	10	11	4	2	1	3	5	0	0

=== Top scorers ===
Includes all competitive matches. The list is sorted by shirt number when total goals are equal.

Last updated on 30 May 2009

Position	Nation	Number	Name	Soproni Liga	UEFA Cup	Hungarian Cup	League Cup	Total
1	(Hungary)	14	Gergely Rudolf	16	3	0	0	19
2	(Hungary)	41	Lóránt Oláh	12	1	0	0	13
3	(Nigeria)	99	Omagbemi Dudu	4	1	5	0	10
4	(Hungary)	55	Péter Szakály	9	0	0	0	9
5	(Hungary)	77	Péter Czvitkovics	7	0	0	0	7
6	(Hungary)	4	Leandro de Almeida	5	0	1	0	6
7	(Hungary)	17	Norbert Mészáros	3	0	0	0	3
8	(Hungary)	8	Zsombor Kerekes	1	0	2	0	3
9	(Serbia)	10	Igor Bogdanović	0	0	3	0	3
10	(Hungary)	2	István Szűcs	2	0	0	0	2
11	(Hungary)	30	Zoltán Kiss	2	0	0	0	2
12	(Hungary)	23	Péter Szilágyi	2	0	0	0	2
13	(Hungary)	7	Tibor Dombi	2	0	0	0	2
14	(Hungary)	13	Péter Bíró	1	0	0	0	1
15	(Hungary)	27	Gábor Demjén	1	0	0	0	1
16	(Brazil)	19	Vinicius Galvão Leal	1	0	0	0	1
17	(Montenegro)	1	Vukašin Poleksić	1	0	0	0	1
18	(Hungary)	83	Zoltán Varga	0	0	1	0	1
19	(Hungary)	16	Ádám Komlósi	0	0	1	0	1
/	/	/	Own Goals	1	0	0	0	1
			TOTALS	70	5	13	0	88

=== Disciplinary record ===
Includes all competitive matches. Players with 1 card or more included only.

Last updated on 30 May 2009

Position	Nation	Number	Name	Soproni Liga		UEFA Cup		Hungarian Cup		League Cup		Total (Hu Total)	
Position	Nation	Number	Name	Booked	Sent off (straight red)	Booked	Sent off (straight red)	Booked	Sent off (straight red)	Booked	Sent off (straight red)	Booked	Sent off (straight red)
GK	(Montenegro)	1	Vukašin Poleksić	1	0	0	0	0	0	0	0	1 (1)	0 (0)
DF	(Hungary)	2	István Szűcs	2	0	1	0	0	0	0	0	3 (2)	0 (0)
MF	(Hungary)	4	Leandro de Almeida	5	0	0	0	1	0	0	0	6 (5)	0 (0)
DF	(Hungary)	6	Zoltán Takács	5	0	1	0	0	0	0	0	6 (5)	0 (0)
MF	(Hungary)	7	Tibor Dombi	3	0	1	0	1	0	0	0	5 (3)	0 (0)
FW	(Hungary)	8	Zsombor Kerekes	1	0	0	0	0	0	0	0	1 (1)	0 (0)
FW	(Hungary)	14	Gergely Rudolf	3	0	2	0	0	0	0	0	5 (3)	0 (0)
MF	(Hungary)	15	László Rezes	1	0	0	0	0	0	0	0	1 (1)	0 (0)
DF	(Hungary)	16	Ádám Komlósi	5	0	0	0	0	0	0	0	5 (5)	0 (0)
DF	(Hungary)	17	Norbert Mészáros	1	0	0	0	0	0	0	0	1 (1)	0 (0)
FW	(Brazil)	19	Vinicius Galvão Leal	2	0	0	0	0	0	0	0	2 (2)	0 (0)
DF	(Hungary)	22	Csaba Bernáth	4	1	1	0	0	0	0	0	5 (4)	1 (1)
GK	(Hungary)	24	Norbert Csernyánszki	0	0	0	0	0	1	0	0	0 (0)	1 (0)
DF	(Hungary)	28	Zoltán Nagy	1	0	0	0	1	0	0	0	2 (1)	0 (0)
MF	(Hungary)	30	Zoltán Kiss	2	0	0	0	0	0	0	0	2 (2)	0 (0)
MF	(Hungary)	33	József Varga	2	0	0	0	0	0	0	0	2 (2)	0 (0)
MF	(Hungary)	55	Péter Szakály	1	0	0	0	0	0	0	0	1 (1)	0 (0)
DF	(Brazil)	57	Hugo Nascimento	0	0	0	0	1	0	0	0	1 (0)	0 (0)
MF	(Hungary)	77	Péter Czvitkovics	4	0	0	0	0	0	0	0	4 (4)	0 (0)
MF	(Hungary)	88	Tamás Huszák	0	0	1	0	2	0	0	0	3 (0)	0 (0)
FW	(Nigeria)	99	Omagbemi Dudu	1	0	0	0	0	1	0	0	1 (1)	1 (0)
			TOTALS	44	1	7	0	6	2	0	0	57 (44)	3 (1)
