= 2007–08 Nyíregyháza Spartacus FC season =

Nyíregyháza
2007–08 season
- Manager: Attila Révész
- Stadium: Városi Stadion
- Nemzeti Bajnokság I: 10th
- Magyar Kupa: Round of 16
- Ligakupa: Autumn season: Group stage Spring season: Group stage

The 2007–08 season was Nyíregyháza Spartacus Football Club's 9th competitive season, 1st consecutive season in the Nemzeti Bajnokság I and 79th year in existence as a football club. In addition to the domestic league, Nyíregyháza participated in this season's editions of the Magyar Kupa and the Ligakupa.

== Squad ==
Note: Flags indicate national team as defined under FIFA eligibility rules; some limited exceptions apply. Players may hold more than one non-FIFA nationality.

No.	Pos.	Nation	Player
1	GK	HUN	Dániel Illyés
2	DF	ARG	Ivan Zaleh
3	DF	ROU	Claudiu Cornaci
4	DF	HUN	Tamás Sipos
5	DF	HUN	György Cséke
6	DF	HUN	Árpád Ambrusz
7	FW	HUN	Tibor Montvai
10	MF	HUN	Ákos Lippai
11	FW	HUN	Balázs Granát
11	MF	HUN	Attila Zabos
12	MF	HUN	László Miskolczi
17	MF	HUN	Tibor Hegedüs

No.	Pos.	Nation	Player
18	MF	ROU	Szabolcs Perenyi
20	MF	HUN	Tibor Minczér
21	FW	CMR	George Menougong
22	GK	HUN	Miklós Erdélyi
25	FW	HUN	Norbert Szilágyi
26	DF	HUN	Gábor Bagoly
27	MF	HON	Luis Ramos
28	MF	HUN	Béla Kovács
55	GK	HUN	Tamás Takács
99	FW	BRA	Welton
—	FW	SVK	Pavol Piatka

== Competitions ==
=== Overview ===
Competition	First match	Last match	Starting round	Final position	Record							
Competition	First match	Last match	Starting round	Final position	Pld	W	D	L	GF	GA	GD	Win %
Nemzeti Bajnokság I	28 July 2007	30 May 2008	Matchday 1	10th	30	11	7	12	34	37	−3	36.67
Magyar Kupa	5 September 2007	7 November 2007	Third round	Round of 16	4	3	0	1	8	4	+4	75.00
Ligakupa (Autumn season)	15 August 2007	10 October 2007	Group stage	Group Stage	6	3	0	3	8	6	+2	50.00
Ligakupa (Spring season)	1 December 2007	27 February 2008	Group stage	Group Stage	6	0	2	4	4	10	−6	0.00
Total					46	17	9	20	54	57	−3	36.96

Source: Competitions

=== Nemzeti Bajnokság I ===
==== League table ====
Pos	Team	Pld	W	D	L	GF	GA	GD	Pts	Qualification or relegation
8	Honvéd	30	12	7	11	45	36	+9	43	Qualification for Intertoto Cup first round
9	Vasas	30	12	5	13	41	45	−4	41	
10	Nyíregyháza	30	11	7	12	34	37	−3	40	
11	Paks	30	9	10	11	51	51	0	37	
12	Rákospalota	30	7	9	14	42	60	−18	30	

Source: soccerway.com

==== Results summary ====
Overall								Home						Away					
Pld	W	D	L	GF	GA	GD	Pts	W	D	L	GF	GA	GD	W	D	L	GF	GA	GD
30	11	7	12	34	37	−3	40	9	1	5	25	13	+12	2	6	7	9	24	−15

Source: Hungarian Football Federation

==== Results by round ====
Round	1	2	3	4	5	6	7	8	9	10	11	12	13	14	15	16	17	18	19	20	21	22	23	24	25	26	27	28	29	30
Ground	H	A	H	A	H	A	H	A	H	A	H	A	H	A	H	A	H	A	H	A	H	A	H	A	H	A	H	A	H	A
Result	W	W	W	D	L	L	L	D	D	W	W	L	L	D	W	L	W	D	W	L	L	L	W	L	W	D	L	D	W	L
Position	7	4	2	3	5	8	10	9	8	8	5	7	8	8	8	9	8	8	8	9	9	9	9	9	9	9	9	10	9	10

Source: Matches
A = Away; H = Home; W = Win; D = Draw; L = Loss

==== Matches ====
28 July 2007 2	Tatabánya	0–1	Nyíregyháza	Tatabánya
		Report	Montvai 32'	Stadium: Stadion Városi; Referee: Roland Veizer

4 August 2007 3	Nyíregyháza	2–0	Rákospalota	Nyíregyháza
	Lippai 52'; Bagoly (yellow card) 67', (goal) 82'; Vukadinović (yellow card) 84'	Report	Kapcsos (yellow card) 21'; Polonkai (yellow card) 90+1'	Stadium: Városi Stadion; Attendance: 4,000; Referee: Zoltán Iványi

11 August 2007 4	Sopron	1–1	Nyíregyháza	Sopron
	Tchana 10'	Report	Miskolczi 27'	Stadium: Stadion Városi; Referee: István Mészáros

18 August 2007 5	Nyíregyháza	0–1	Fehérvár	Nyíregyháza
		Report	B. Farkas 36'	Stadium: Városi Stadion; Referee: Viktor Kassai

25 August 2007 6	Paks	3–0	Nyíregyháza	Paks
	Hanák 47'; F. Horváth 71'; Márkus 90'	Report		Stadium: Fehérvári úti Stadion; Referee: Péter Solymosi

29 August 2007 1	Nyíregyháza	1–0	Győr	Nyíregyháza
	Hegedüs 44'	Report		Stadium: Városi Stadion; Referee: Sándor Andó-Szabó

1 September 2007 7	Nyíregyháza	1–2	Újpest	Nyíregyháza
	Zaleh 51'	Report	Radulovic 35'; Roiha 80'	Stadium: Városi Stadion; Referee: István Mészáros

15 September 2007 8	Diósgyőr	0–0	Nyíregyháza	Miskolc
		Report		Stadium: Diósgyőri Stadion; Referee: Zsolt Szabó

22 September 2007 9	Nyíregyháza	1–1	Debrecen	Nyíregyháza
	Menougong 9'	Report	Kerekes 65'	Stadium: Városi Stadion; Referee: István Vad

29 September 2007 10	Siófok	0–1	Nyíregyháza	Siófok
		Report	N. Szilágyi 12'	Stadium: Révész Géza utcai Stadion; Referee: Roland Veizer

6 October 2007 11	Nyíregyháza	2–1	Zalaegerszeg	Nyíregyháza
	Bagoly (yellow card) 34'; Cornaci (yellow card) 67', (goal) 70'; Vukadinović 78'	Report	Koplárovics 2'; Méyé (yellow card) 40'; N. Tóth (yellow card) 45'; Vulin (yellow card) 56'	Stadium: Városi Stadion; Referee: Krisztián Pánczél

22 October 2007 12	MTK	2–0	Nyíregyháza	Budapest
	Bori 43'; Á. Szabó 50'	Report		Stadium: Hidegkuti Nándor Stadion; Referee: Tamás Bognár

3 November 2007 13	Nyíregyháza	0–2	Kaposvár	Nyíregyháza
		Report	Alves 30', 38'	Stadium: Városi Stadion; Referee: Gergely Sulyok

10 November 2007 14	Honvéd	0–0	Nyíregyháza	Budapest
		Report		Stadium: Bozsik József Stadion; Referee: Tamás Arany

24 November 2007 15	Nyíregyháza	2–1	Vasas	Nyíregyháza
	N. Szilágyi 30'; Montvai 82'	Report	Németh 39'	Stadium: Városi Stadion; Referee: István Vad

23 February 2008 16	Győr	5–0	Nyíregyháza	Győr
	Tokody 7', 77'; Völgyi 21'; Dudás 54'; Brnović 79'	Report		Stadium: ETO Park; Referee: Ferenc Bede

1 March 2008 17	Nyíregyháza	5–0	Tatabánya	Nyíregyháza
	Granát 49'; N. Szilágyi 57'; Bagoly 73'; Lippai 77'; Dosso 83'	Report		Stadium: Városi Stadion; Referee: Ádám Németh

8 March 2008 18	Rákospalota	2–2	Nyíregyháza	Sopron (Note: The match was played at the Káposztás utcai Stadion in Sopron, instead of REAC regular stadium, the Budai II. László Stadion in Budapest, which did not meet HFF requirements.)
	Nyerges 59'; Rása (yellow card) 60'; Torma 61'	Report	Ramos (yellow card) 58'; B. Kovács 82'; Dosso 86'; Perenyi (yellow card) 90+1'	Stadium: Káposztás utcai Stadion; Attendance: 1,300; Referee: Krisztián Pánczél

15 March 2008 19	Nyíregyháza	3–0 (Awarded)	Sopron	Nyíregyháza
		Report		Stadium: Városi Stadion

22 March 2008 20	Fehérvár	2–1	Nyíregyháza	Székesfehérvár
	Dvéri 16'; Sitku 63'	Report	Cornaci 73'	Stadium: Sóstói Stadion; Referee: József Berger

29 March 2008 21	Nyíregyháza	1–2	Paks	Nyíregyháza
	N. Szilágyi 58'	Report	Weitner 90+2'; Tököli 90+4'	Stadium: Városi Stadion; Referee: Csaba Imre Sápi

7 April 2008 22	Újpest	1–0	Nyíregyháza	Budapest
	Dourandi 83'	Report		Stadium: Szusza Ferenc Stadion; Referee: Zoltán Iványi

12 April 2008 23	Nyíregyháza	2–1	Diósgyőr	Nyíregyháza
	Granát 12'; Miskolczi 45'	Report	Honma 55'	Stadium: Városi Stadion; Referee: István Mészáros

19 April 2008 24	Debrecen	4–1	Nyíregyháza	Debrecen
	Huszák 25'; Z. Takács 44'; Bagoly 73' (o.g.); Leandro 83'; Bíró (yellow card) 86'	Report	Mboussi (yellow card) 41'; Bagoly 51', (yellow card) 83'	Stadium: Oláh Gábor utcai Stadion; Referee: Ferenc Bede

26 April 2008 25	Nyíregyháza	2–0	Siófok	Nyíregyháza
	Dosso 10'; Miskolczi 42'	Report		Stadium: Városi Stadion; Referee: Zoltán Iványi

3 May 2008 26	Zalaegerszeg	0–0	Nyíregyháza	Zalaegerszeg
	Botiș (yellow card) 40'	Report	Cséke (yellow card) 25'; Mboussi (yellow card) 41'; Ramos (yellow card) 80'	Stadium: ZTE Arena; Referee: Szabolcs Szilasi

9 May 2008 27	Nyíregyháza	0–2	MTK	Nyíregyháza
		Report	J. Kanta 29'; Urbán 51'	Stadium: Városi Stadion; Referee: Tamás Arany

17 May 2008 28	Kaposvár	1–1	Nyíregyháza	Kaposvár
	Alves 43'	Report	Miskolczi 70'	Stadium: Rákóczi Stadion; Referee: Viktor Kassai

25 May 2008 29	Nyíregyháza	3–0	Honvéd	Nyíregyháza
	Filó 31' (o.g.); Lippai 51'; Ramos 79'	Report		Stadium: Városi Stadion; Referee: Gergely Sulyok

30 May 2008 30	Vasas	3–1	Nyíregyháza	Budapest
	Lázok 53'; Pandur 70'; Németh 90'	Report	Lippai 45'	Stadium: Illovszky Rudolf Stadion; Referee: Zoltán Iványi

=== Magyar Kupa ===
5 September 2007 Third round	Bőcs	0–2	Nyíregyháza	Bőcs
		Report	Menougong 10'; Vukadinović 50'	Stadium: Bőcs Sportpálya; Referee: Gábor Oláh

26 September 2007 Round of 32	Békéscsaba	2–5	Nyíregyháza	Békéscsaba
	Pozsár 5'; R. Ladányi 7'	Report	N. Szilágyi 35'; Rojas 40'; Krajnc 70'; Lippai 76'; Menougong 88'	Stadium: Kórház utcai Stadion; Referee: István Mészáros

==== Round of 16 ====
24 October 2007 First leg	Gyirmót	2–0	Nyíregyháza	Győr
	G. Varga 23', 69'	Report		Stadium: Ménfői úti Stadion; Referee: Tamás Arany

7 November 2007 Second leg	Nyíregyháza	1–0 (1–2 agg.)	Gyirmót	Nyíregyháza
	Zabos 59'	Report		Stadium: Városi Stadion; Referee: Mihály Fábián
Note: Gyirmót won 2–1 on aggregate.

=== Ligakupa ===
==== Autumn season ====
===== Group stage =====
Pos	Team	Pld	W	D	L	GF	GA	GD	Pts	Qualification	DEB	DIO	NYI	VAS
1	Debrecen	6	3	2	1	10	6	+4	11	Advance to knockout phase	—	1–1	3–2	3–0
2	Diósgyőr	6	3	1	2	6	6	0	10	Advance to knockout phase	2–0	—	1–0	2–1
3	Nyíregyháza	6	3	0	3	8	6	+2	9		0–2	1–0	—	4–0
4	Vasas	6	1	1	4	5	11	−6	4		1–1	3–0	0–1	—

Source: HFF

15 August 2007 1	Nyíregyháza	4–0	Vasas	Nyíregyháza
17:00 CEST (UTC+2)	Menougong 3', 48', 64'; N. Szilágyi 20'	Report		Stadium: Városi Stadion; Referee: József Berger

22 August 2007 2	Debrecen	3–2	Nyíregyháza	Debrecen
16:00 CEST (UTC+2)	Zsolnai 28'; Kerekes 41'; Dombi 68'	Report	Moldovan 58'; Cséke 83'	Stadium: Oláh Gábor utcai Stadion; Referee: Zoltán Iványi

9 September 2007 3	Diósgyőr	1–0	Nyíregyháza	Miskolc
19:00 CEST (UTC+2)	Ebala 68'	Report		Stadium: Diósgyőri Stadion; Referee: Krisztián Pánczél

19 September 2007 4	Nyíregyháza	1–0	Diósgyőr	Nyíregyháza
16:00 CEST (UTC+2)	Moldovan 41'	Report		Stadium: Városi Stadion; Referee: Ádám Németh

3 October 2007 5	Vasas	0–1	Nyíregyháza	Budapest
17:00 CEST (UTC+2)		Report	Rojas 74'	Stadium: Illovszky Rudolf Stadion; Referee: Tamás Arany

10 October 2007 6	Nyíregyháza	0–2	Debrecen	Nyíregyháza
15:00 CEST (UTC+2)		Report	Sidibe 6'; Kouemaha 64'	Stadium: Városi Stadion; Attendance: 2,500; Referee: Zsolt Szabó

==== Spring season ====
===== Group stage =====
Pos	Team	Pld	W	D	L	GF	GA	GD	Pts	Qualification	DEB	RAK	HON	NYI
1	Debrecen	6	4	1	1	10	8	+2	13	Advance to knockout phase	—	3–2	2–1	2–1
2	Rákospalota (Note: Rákospalota was deducted 1 points)	6	3	1	2	9	10	−1	9	Advance to knockout phase	3–1	—	1–1	2–0
3	Budapest Honvéd	6	2	2	2	13	8	+5	8		1–2	5–0	—	4–2
4	Nyíregyháza	6	0	2	4	4	10	−6	2		0–0	0–1	1–1	—

Source: HFF
Notes:

1 December 2007 1	Honvéd	4–2	Nyíregyháza	Budapest
13:00 CET (UTC+1)	Guié 3'; Hercegfalvi 5', 38'; Zsolnai 84'	Report	Montvai 65'; Apostu 74'	Stadium: Bozsik József Stadion; Referee: Róbert Nagy

5 December 2007 2	Debrecen	2–1	Nyíregyháza	Debrecen
13:00 CET (UTC+1)	Z. Takács 8'; Czvitkovics 34'	Report	Apostu 47'	Stadium: Oláh Gábor utcai Stadion; Referee: Zsolt Szabó

8 December 2007 3	Rákospalota	2–0	Nyíregyháza	Budapest
13:00 CET (UTC+1)	Z. Varga 12'; G. Horváth (yellow card) 19'; Torma 45'	Report	B. Jeddi (yellow card) 90+2'	Stadium: Budai II. László Stadion; Attendance: 150; Referee: Ferenc Bede

16 February 2008 4	Nyíregyháza	0–1	Rákospalota	Nyíregyháza
14:00 CET (UTC+1)		Report	Erős (yellow card) 33'; Cseri (yellow card) 55'; Nyerges 57'	Stadium: Városi Stadion; Attendance: 400; Referee: Zoltán Iványi

20 February 2008 5	Nyíregyháza	1–1	Honvéd	Nyíregyháza
14:00 CET (UTC+1)	Granát 42'	Report	Fritz 80'	Stadium: Városi Stadion; Referee: Sándor Andó-Szabó

27 February 2008 6	Nyíregyháza	0–0	Debrecen	Nyíregyháza
14:00 CET (UTC+1)		Report		Stadium: Városi Stadion; Referee: Róbert Nagy
