= Miklós Erdélyi (footballer) =

Hungarian footballer

Personal information
- Date of birth: 30 March 1981 (age 45)
- Place of birth: Debrecen, Hungary
- Height: 1.94 m (6 ft 4 in)
- Position: Goalkeeper

Team information
- Current team: Debrecen (GK coach)

Senior career*
Years	Team	Apps	(Gls)
1997–1999	Debrecen	1	(0)
1999–2000	MTK Hungaria	0	(0)
2000	Százhalombatta		
2001	Kecskemét		
2001–2002	Hévíz		
2002–2004	MTK Budapest		
2004–2005	Honvéd	10	(0)
2005–2006	Lombard-Papa	2	(0)
2006–2008	Nyíregyháza	17	(0)
2008	→ Bőcs (loan)	6	(0)
2008–2009	Maidenhead United		
2009–2010	Bőcs	6	(0)
2010	Nyíregyháza	8	(0)
2011–2013	Debrecen II	12	(0)
2011–2013	Debrecen	0	(0)

Managerial career
- 2011–: Debrecen (GK coach)
- * Club domestic league appearances and goals

Attila Mészáros (born 30 March 1981) is a Hungarian football coach and a former goalkeeper. He is the goalkeepers coach with Debrecen.
