= Borsod Brewery =

Brewery in Bőcs, near Miskolc, Hungary

- Native name: Borsodi Sörgyár Rt
- Founded: 1973
- Headquarters: Bőcs, Borsod-Abaúj-Zemplén County, Hungary
- Key people: CEO: Derek Hopkins
- Products: Borsodi Sör; Borsodi Póló; Borsodi Bivaly; Borostyán; Rákóczi sör
- Owner: Molson Coors Brewing Company
- Website: borsodi.hu

Borsodi Brewery or Brewery of Borsod (Borsodi Sörgyár Rt.) is a brewery located in the village of Bőcs, near Miskolc, the capital of Borsod-Abaúj-Zemplén county in northeastern Hungary.

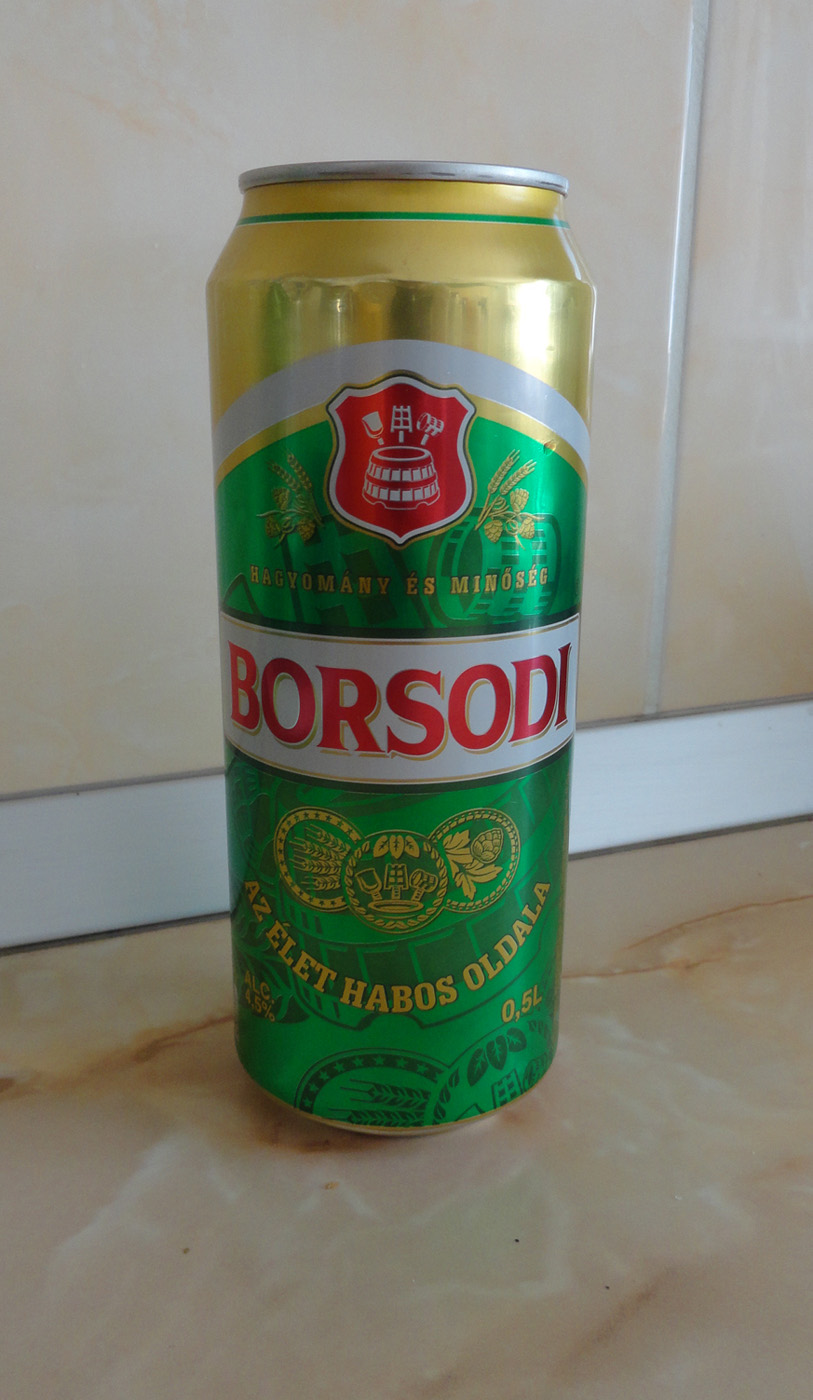
Borsodi - "Az élet habos oldala" - "The frothy side of life"

== History ==
Construction of a 22,000 m^{2} brewery began in 1969 in the village of Bőcs, Hungary. The brewery began producing beer in 1973 with initial production of 874,000 hl. In 1991 after the fall of communism, the brewery was privatized and in 1993 it was purchased by the Belgian Interbrew (now InBev). The purchase of the brewery led to significant improvements in several aspects of brewing including higher quality, use of improved technology, and better product development. Although the company has been under foreign ownership since 1993, it still produces a line of Hungarian beers in addition to some foreign beers brewed under license.

At the Borsodi Sörgyár Rt. plant in Bőcs, northern Hungary, another brewery with a capacity of 370 million liters per year for Ft 1.5 billion was put into operation in March 2005. The plant produces about 33% more beer than the old one. The huge boilers and vats imported from Korea are able to manage 28 tons of raw material at once. The process consumes 10% less energy.

In mid October 2009, private equity fund CVC Capital Partners bought all of Anheuser–Busch InBev's holdings in Central Europe (including Borsod) for €2.23 billion. They renamed the operations StarBev.

In 2012, the StarBev Group was taken over by Molson Coors Brewing Company, an American-Canadian brewing company which is the fifth biggest brewer in the world.

Borsodi is a market leader in Hungary. During the socialist period, all breweries in Hungary had defined regions, where they operated. There was no competition between the breweries for local markets. Borsodi was in charge of the eastern part of Hungary and supplied this market. After the privatization process in the early 1990s, all breweries became competitors as they fought for the largest possible share of the Hungarian market. Borsodi managed to remain competitive and strengthened its position on the Hungarian beer market by offering beer drinkers a wide range of brands. The brewery's main brand is “Borsodi Sör”. In order to maintain and improve the market position, the company is using marketing communication activities: The brewery regularly participates in the organization and sponsorship of various sports and music events. Borsodi collaborates with the University of Miskolc for market research projects. The university also has a post-graduate program in which Borsodi's staff is trained. The brewery is also collaborating with the Food and Agricultural University (Kertészeti Egyetem) located in Budapest, which trains food engineers.

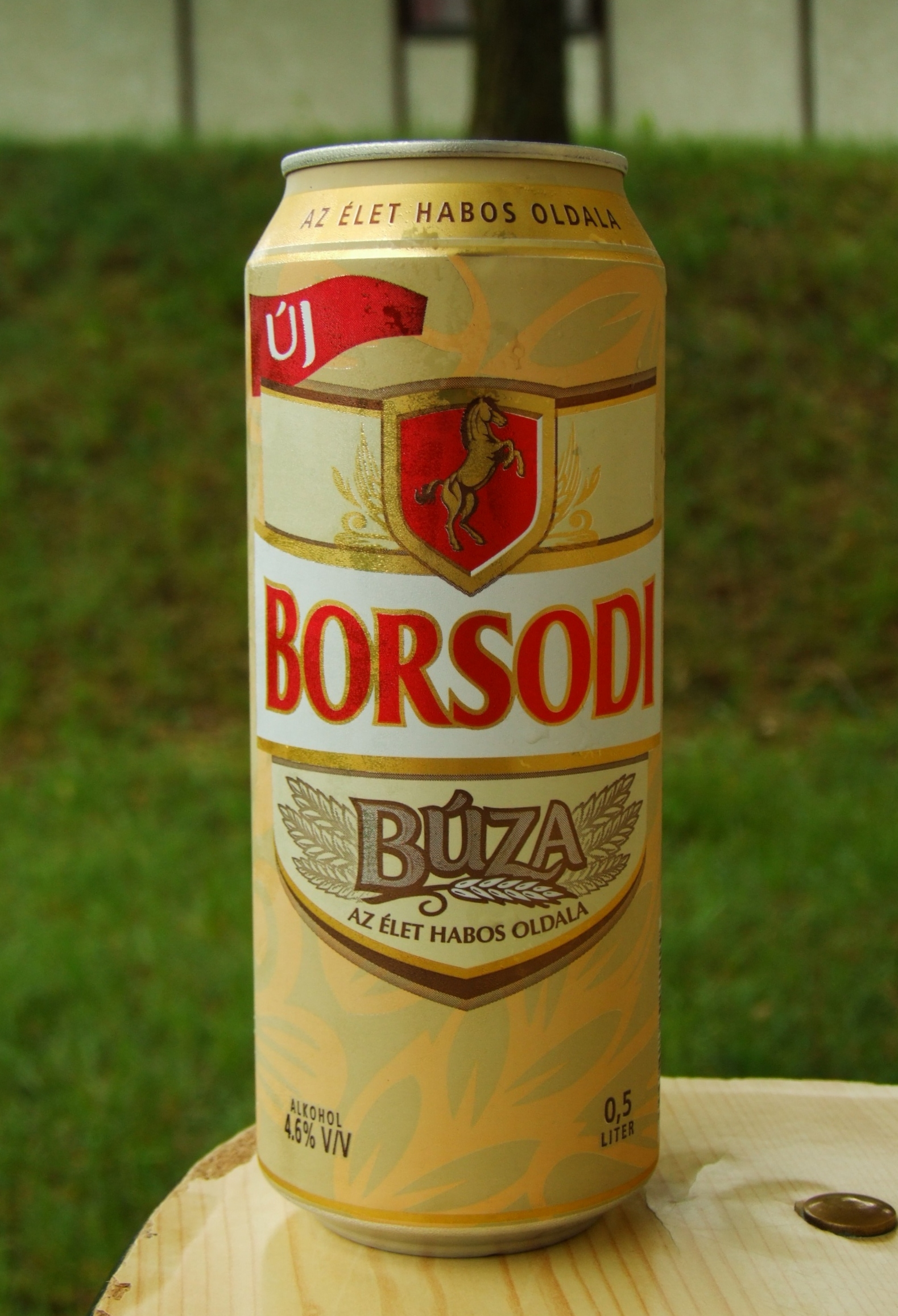
The Borsodi Búza is made from wheat

== Beers ==
As of October 2005, Borsodi Sörgyár produces 5 kinds of Hungarian beer. The beers are well known throughout Hungary.

- Borsodi Sör (4.6% alcohol, pale lager) – The flagship of the brewery and best-selling beer brand in Hungary is a traditional golden-colored light beer.
- Borsodi Bivaly (6.5% alcohol, Hungarian lager) – Introduced in 2004 as a stronger (both in taste and alcohol content) light-colored beer.
- Borsodi Barna (6.7% alcohol, dark German style)
- Borsodi Póló (0.5% alcohol, non-alcoholic beer) – A light, non-alcoholic beer introduced in 1996.
- Borostyán (5.2% alcohol, amber) – A premium beer introduced in 2003 using a unique roasted malt which gives it an amber color, and a mildly bitter taste.
- Borsodi Super Dry (4% alcohol)

Borsodi Sörgyár also produces Beck's and Stella Artois under license. In addition to the beers it brews on site, Borsodi Sörgyár sells and distributes Belle-vue Kriek, Hoegaarden, Leffe, and Staropramen in Hungary.
