= Dejan Vukadinović =

Montenegrin footballer

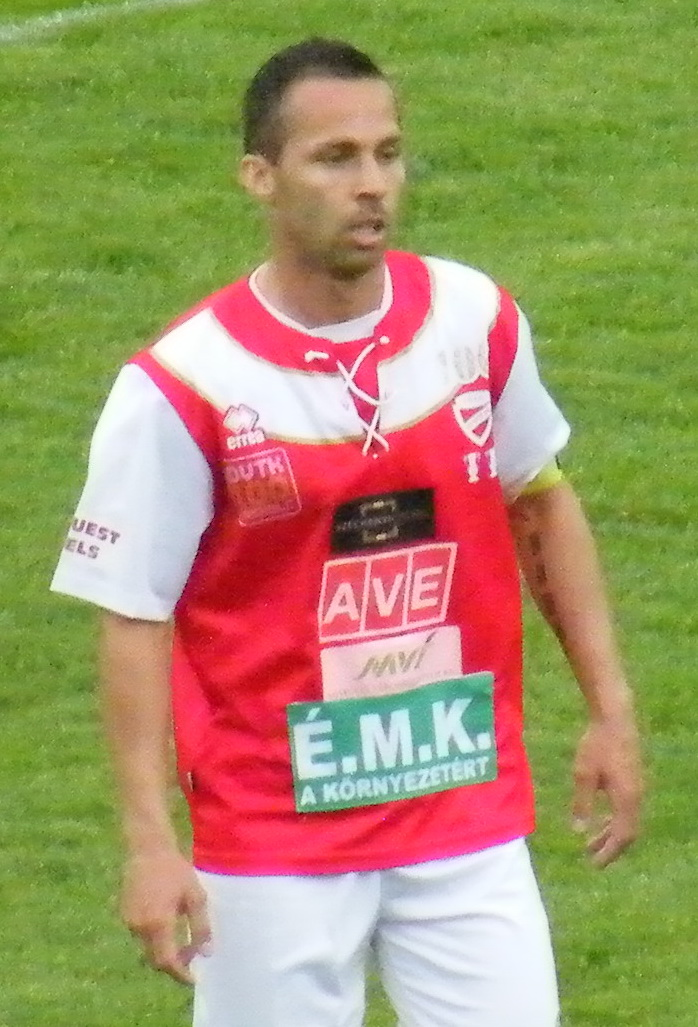

Personal information
- Date of birth: 3 September 1982 (age 44)
- Place of birth: Titograd, SFR Yugoslavia
- Height: 1.80 m (5 ft 11 in)
- Positions: Defensive midfielder; right midfielder

Senior career*
Years	Team	Apps	(Gls)
1996–2000	Budućnost Podgorica	60	(4)
2000–2001	OFK Beograd	20	(3)
2001–2002	1. FC Schweinfurt 05	12	(7)
2002–2003	Mogren	27	(3)
2003	Vojvodina	9	(4)
2004	Kom	10	(8)
2004	Bokelj	13	(1)
2005	ČSK Čelarevo	4	(3)
2005–2008	Nyíregyháza Spartacus	57	(4)
2008	Viktoria Žižkov	4	(2)
2009–2010	Diósgyőr	21	(2)
2010–2011	MTK Budapest	26	(0)
2011	Nyíregyháza Spartacus	9	(2)
2012-2013	Chainat Hornbill	29	(0)
- * Club domestic league appearances and goals

Dejan Vukadinović (Serbian Cyrillic: Дејан Вукадиновић; born 3 September 1982) is a Montenegrin retired footballer and football agent mostly in South East Asia.

He developed his connection with football in his native Montenegro, beginning as an active player, and established a network of associations and friendships across the football world.

== Playing career ==
Born in Titograd, he had played with Montenegrin clubs FK Budućnost Podgorica and FK Mogren, Serbian clubs OFK Beograd and FK Vojvodina, German 1. FC Schweinfurt 05, Hungarian Nyíregyháza Spartacus FC and Diósgyőri VTK and Czech FK Viktoria Žižkov.

In 2012, he signed for join Chainat.

== Football agent career ==
In addition to numerous transfers in South Asia, Vukadinović's biggest achievement is signing head coach of Thailand national football team, Milovan Rajevac in April 2017.
