= Péter Odrobéna =

Hungarian footballer

Personal information
- Full name: Péter Odrobéna
- Date of birth: 28 June 1985 (age 41)
- Place of birth: Kazincbarcika, Hungary
- Height: 1.94 m (6 ft 4 in)
- Position: Midfielder

Team information
- Current team: Völsungur
- Number: 17

Senior career*
Years	Team	Apps	(Gls)
2003–2006	Kazincbarcika	26	(7)
2006–2008	Vasas	20	(1)
2008	→ Kazincbarcika (loan)	7	(0)
2008–2009	Nyíregyháza	11	(1)
2009–2010	Tiszaújváros	?	(11)
2010–2011	Kazincbarcika	26	(10)
2011–2012	Cegléd	22	(4)
2012–2013	Putnok	27	(7)
2013–2017	Völsungur	0	(0)
- * Club domestic league appearances and goals as of 3 February 2013

Péter Odrobéna (born 18 October 1985 in Kazincbarcika) is a Hungarian football player who currently plays for Völsungur.
