= Leonardo (footballer, born 1987) =

Brazilian footballer

Personal information
- Full name: Hugo Leonardo Pereira Nascimento
- Date of birth: June 6, 1987 (age 39)
- Place of birth: Rio de Janeiro, Brazil
- Height: 1.75 m (5 ft 9 in)
- Position: Left back

Youth career
- 1997–2007: Vasco da Gama

Senior career*
Years	Team	Apps	(Gls)
2007	Clube 15 de Novembro	23	(0)
2008–2009	Friburguense Atlético Clube	26	(0)
2009	Debreceni VSC	0	(0)
2009–2010	→ Debreceni VSC II	17	(0)
- * Club domestic league appearances and goals

Hugo Leonardo Pereira Nascimento (born June 6, 1987) is a Brazilian footballer currently unattached, he is known as Leonardo.
