= Božidar Ćosić =

Serbian footballer

Personal information
- Date of birth: 25 July 1982 (age 44)
- Place of birth: Šabac, SFR Yugoslavia
- Height: 1.82 m (5 ft 11 1/2 in)
- Position: Left back

Youth career
- Mačva Šabac
- Vojvodina
- 1998–1999: Ajax

Senior career*
Years	Team	Apps	(Gls)
1999–2000	Utrecht	0	(0)
2000	Bayer Uerdingen	0	(0)
2001–2002	Železnik	0	(0)
2002	Loznica	12	(0)
2003	Radnički Stobex	17	(0)
2003–2004	Mačva Šabac	28	(1)
2004–2006	Železnik		
2006	Khimki	8	(0)
2007	Mačva Šabac		
2007–2008	Zemun	12	(0)
2008	Modriča	14	(0)
2009	Debreceni VSC	1	(0)
2009–2010	Petrolul Ploiești	14	(1)
2010–2011	Concordia Chiajna	23	(0)
2011–2012	Turnu Severin	20	(1)
2013	Olt Slatina	20	(1)
2013–2014	Universitatea Craiova	4	(0)

International career
- FR Yugoslavia U16
- * Club domestic league appearances and goals

Božidar Ćosić (Serbian Cyrillic: Божидар Ћосић; born 25 July 1982) is a former Serbian professional footballer.

Born in Šabac, SR Serbia, he played with FK Železnik in the First League of Serbia and Montenegro, with FC Khimki in Russian second level, with FK Modriča in the Bosnian Premier League, and with Debreceni VSC in Nemzeti Bajnokság I. In 2009, he moved to Romania where he played for numeros clubs in the Liga II.
