= Cosmin Goia =

Romanian footballer and manager

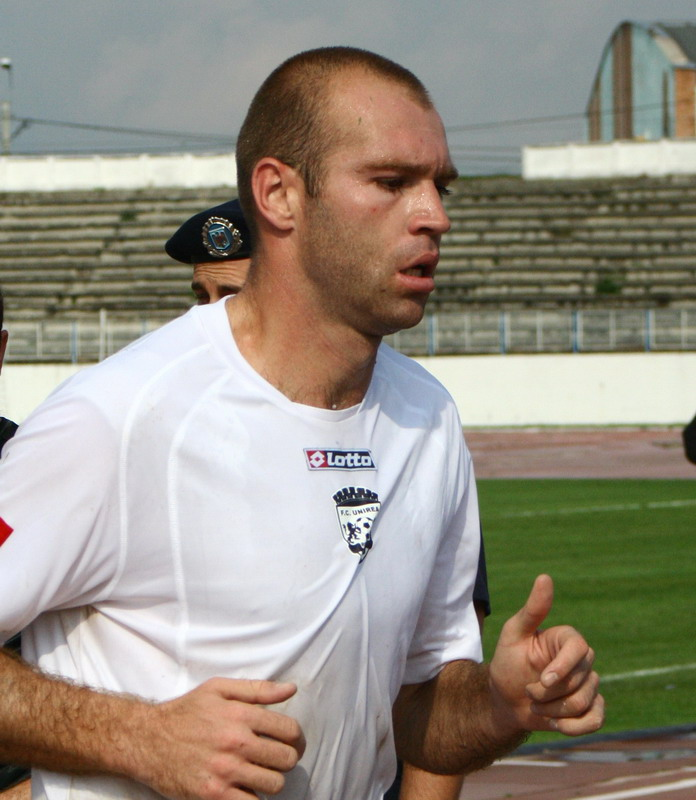

Personal information
- Full name: Cosmin Sabin Goia
- Date of birth: 16 February 1982 (age 44)
- Place of birth: Timișoara, Romania
- Height: 1.88 m (6 ft 2 in)
- Position: Defender

Team information
- Current team: Progresul Ciacova (player-manager)

Senior career*
Years	Team	Apps	(Gls)
2001–2002	Politehnica Timișoara	11	(0)
2002–2003	Seso Câmpia Turzii	26	(6)
2003–2006	CFR Cluj	39	(3)
2006	→ Unirea Dej (loan)	9	(0)
2006–2007	Brașov	5	(0)
2007–2008	Unirea Alba Iulia	28	(0)
2008–2011	Nyíregyháza Spartacus	58	(6)
2010	→ Mureșul Deva (loan)	9	(1)
2011–2012	Pécs	12	(0)
2013	SHB-Đà Nẵng	11	(1)
2014	Sanna Khánh Hòa	6	(0)
2014	Timișul Șag	?	(?)
2015	Hoàng Anh Gia Lai	4	(0)
2016	Sighetu Marmației	?	(?)
2016	Timișul Șag	?	(?)
2017–2018	ASO Deta	?	(?)
2018–	Progresul Ciacova	?	(?)

Managerial career
- 2016: Timișul Șag (assistant)
- 2018–: Progresul Ciacova
- * Club domestic league appearances and goals

Cosmin Sabin Goia (born 16 February 1982) is a Romanian football defender and manager who plays and manages for Liga IV – Timiș County club Progresul Ciacova. Goia played in Romania for teams like: Politehnica Timișoara, CFR Cluj, Brașov and Unirea Alba Iulia, in Hungary for Nyíregyháza Spartacus and Pécs and in Vietnam for SHB-Đà Nẵng, Sanna Khánh Hòa and Hoàng Anh Gia Lai.

== External sources ==
- Sabin-Cosmin Goia at HLSZ.hu (in Hungarian)
- Sabin-Cosmin Goia at RomanianSoccer.ro (in Romanian)
- Sabin-Cosmin Goia at FBref.com
- Cosmin-Sabin Goia at Soccerway
