= Ákos Lippai =

Hungarian footballer

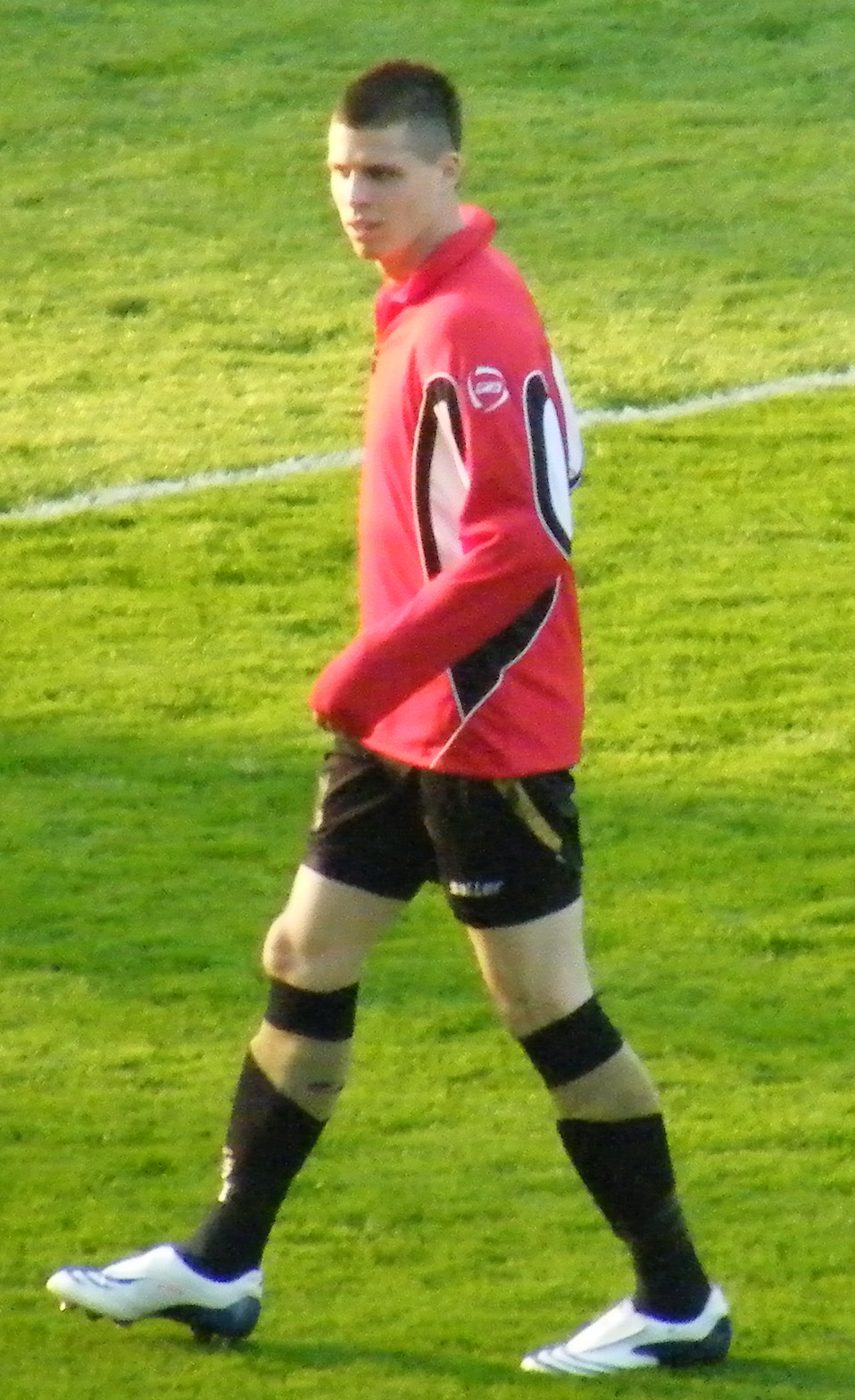

Personal information
- Full name: Ákos Lippai
- Date of birth: 13 June 1979 (age 47)
- Place of birth: Miskolc, Hungary
- Height: 1.74 m (5 ft 8 1/2 in)
- Position: Midfielder

Team information
- Current team: Diósgyőri VTK
- Number: 79

Senior career*
Years	Team	Apps	(Gls)
1999–2000	Diósgyőri VTK	23	(2)
2000–2001	FC Sopron	?	(?)
2001–2002	Diósgyőri VTK	8	(0)
2002–2003	Kecskeméti TE	15	(1)
2003–2004	Egri FC	?	(?)
2004	Bőcs KSC	23	(22)
2004–2005	Hapoel Zafririm Holon	?	(?)
2005–2006	Bőcs KSC	12	(6)
2006–2009	Nyíregyháza Spartacus	60	(11)
2009–	Diósgyőri VTK	76	(10)

International career
1997–1998	Hungary U-17	?	(?)
- * Club domestic league appearances and goals as of 27 November 2011

Ákos Lippai (born 13 June 1979 in Miskolc) is a Hungarian football player who currently plays for Diósgyőri VTK.
