= George Menougong =

Cameroonian-born Hungarian footballer

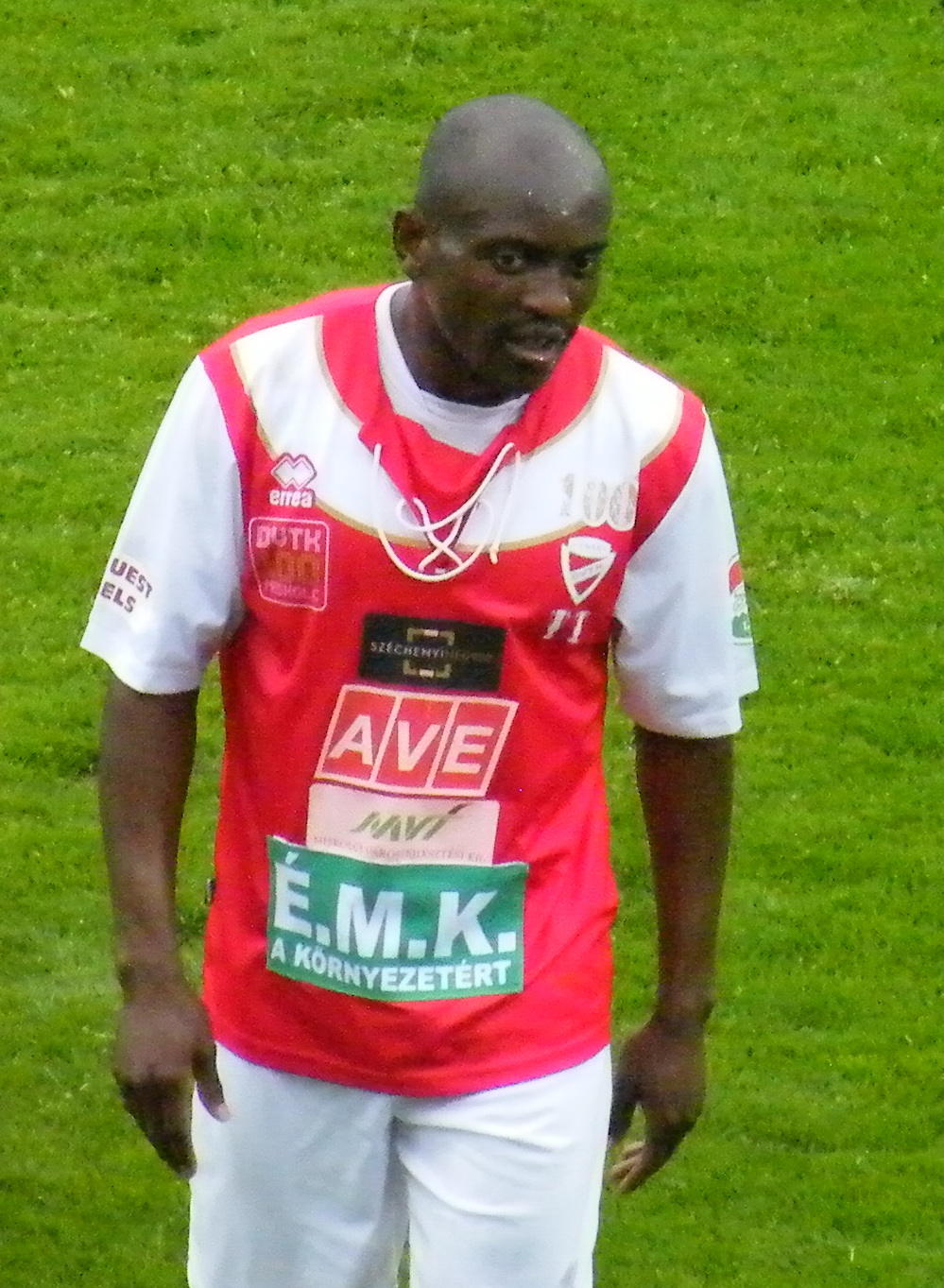

Personal information
- Date of birth: 18 May 1985 (age 41)
- Place of birth: Yaoundé, Cameroon
- Height: 1.74 m (5 ft 8 1/2 in)
- Position: Forward

Youth career
- 2001–2003: Espoirs de Yaoundé

Senior career*
Years	Team	Apps	(Gls)
2004–2005	Nagykálló	10	(1)
2005–2006	Jászapáti	23	(5)
2006–2008	Nyíregyháza	31	(1)
2008–2010	Bőcs	44	(13)
2010–2012	Diósgyőr	43	(15)
2012–2013	Kazincbarcika	12	(2)
2013–2015	Mezőkövesd	53	(13)
- * Club domestic league appearances and goals as of 1 January 2015

George Menougong (born 18 May 1985 in Yaoundé) is a Cameroon-born Hungarian football player. who currently plays for Mezőkövesd-Zsóry SE.
