= Yuriy Shevel =

Ukrainian footballer

Personal information
- Full name: Yuriy Mykolayovych Shevel
- Date of birth: 29 January 1988 (age 38)
- Place of birth: Vyshneve, Kyiv Oblast, Ukrainian SSR
- Height: 1.80 m (5 ft 11 in)
- Position: Forward

Youth career
- 2001–2002: Dynamo Kyiv
- 2002–2003: Lokomotyv Kyiv
- 2003–2005: Dynamo Kyiv

Senior career*
Years	Team	Apps	(Gls)
2005–2009	FC Dynamo Kyiv	0	(0)
2005–2008	→FC Dynamo-3 Kyiv	33	(9)
2007	→FC Dynamo-2 Kyiv	7	(2)
2008	→Nyíregyháza Spartacus FC (loan)	8	(1)
2008	→Nyíregyháza Spartacus II (loan)	2	(0)
2010–2011	Kaposvölgye VSC	24	(1)
2011–2012	FC Odesa	9	(1)
2012–2014	FC Olimpia	22	(6)
2013	→FC Dacia Chișinău (loan)	4	(1)
2015	FC Guria Lanchkhuti	5	(1)
2016	FC Zugdidi	12	(1)
2017	SC Tavriya Simferopol	7	(1)

International career^{‡}
2003	Ukraine-16	3	(1)
2004	Ukraine-17	3	(1)
2006	Ukraine-18	5	(0)
2007	Ukraine-19	2	(1)
2008	Ukraine-21	1	(0)
- * Club domestic league appearances and goals as of 28 September 2017 ‡ National team caps and goals as of 28 September 2017

Yuriy Shevel (Ukrainian: Юрій Миколайович Шевель; born 29 January 1988) is a Ukrainian football forward.

== Club statistics ==
- Total matches played for FC Olimpia Bălți in Moldavian First League: 22 matches, 6 goals.
