= Yves Mboussi =

Cameroonian footballer

Personal information
- Full name: Yves Simplice Mboussi
- Date of birth: 30 May 1987 (age 39)
- Place of birth: Bafia, Cameroon
- Height: 1.88 m (6 ft 2 in)
- Position: Defender

Team information
- Current team: Balassagyarmat
- Number: 12

Senior career*
Years	Team	Apps	(Gls)
2005–2006	Bellinzona	34	(8)
2006–2008	Team Ticino	30	(6)
2009–2010	Nyíregyháza	55	(5)
2010	→ Vecsés (loan)	12	(1)
2010–2011	Milsami	36	(4)
2011–2013	Hà Nội	22	(4)
2013–2015	Kisvárda	19	(2)
2016–	Balassagyarmat	3	
- * Club domestic league appearances and goals as of 1 August 2016

Yves Simplice Mboussi (born 30 May 1987 in Bafia, Cameroon) is a Cameroonian footballer who plays for Vietnamese football club Hà Nội playing in V-League. He plays in defender.

From 2009 to 2010, he played for Hungarian club Nyíregyháza Spartacus in Nemzeti Bajnokság II.

From 2010 to 2011, he played for Moldovan club Milsami in Moldovan National Division.
