= Szabolcs Perenyi =

Romanian-born Hungarian footballer

Szabolcs Perényi
Personal information
- Full name: Szabolcs Mihai Perényi
- Date of birth: 5 July 1982 (age 44)
- Place of birth: Carei, Romania
- Height: 1.80 m (5 ft 11 in)
- Position: Right back

Senior career*
Years	Team	Apps	(Gls)
2000	Dinamo București	1	(0)
2000–2001	FCM Câmpina	4	(0)
2001–2003	ARO Câmpulung	35	(3)
2003–2004	Dinamo București	15	(0)
2004	Politehnica Iași	11	(0)
2005–2006	Jiul Petroşani	28	(0)
2006–2007	Farul Constanța	1	(0)
2007–2011	Nyíregyháza Spartacus	52	(0)
Total		147	(3)
- * Club domestic league appearances and goals as of 8 April 2015

Szabolcs Mihai Perényi (born 5 July 1982) is a Romanian-born Hungarian former professional football player.

== Honours ==
=== Club ===
Dinamo București

- Romanian League Championship: 2003–04
- Cupa României: 2003–04

Jiul Petroşani

- Romanian Second League: 2004–05
