= Bogdan Apostu =

Romanian footballer (born 1982)

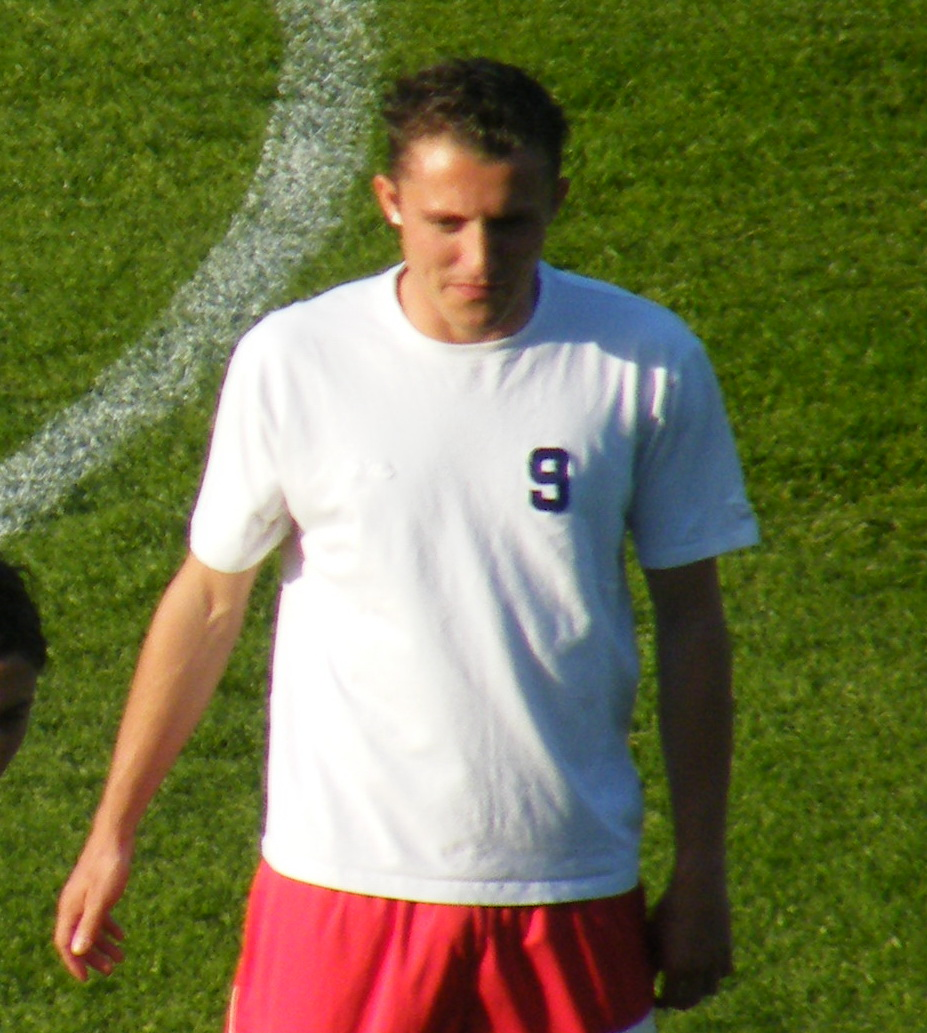

Personal information
- Full name: Bogdan Radu Apostu
- Date of birth: 26 April 1982 (age 44)
- Place of birth: Hunedoara, Romania
- Height: 1.86 m (6 ft 1 in)
- Position: Forward

Team information
- Current team: Gloria Bistrița (general manager)

Youth career
- –1999: Corvinul Hunedoara

Senior career*
| Years | Team | Apps | (Gls) |
| 1999–2001 | Corvinul Hunedoara | 27 | (4) |
| 2001–2003 | Oțelul Galați | 5 | (0) |
| 2003 | Corvinul Hunedoara | 9 | (4) |
| 2004–2005 | UTA Arad | 38 | (16) |
| 2005–2006 | Farul Constanţa | 21 | (3) |
| 2006–2007 | UTA Arad | 29 | (3) |
| 2007–2008 | Bnei Sakhnin | 20 | (5) |
| 2008–2009 | Nyíregyháza | 26 | (11) |
| 2009 | Diósgyőr | 5 | (0) |
| 2010 | Internațional Curtea de Argeș | 15 | (5) |
| 2010–2011 | Pandurii Târgu Jiu | 20 | (4) |
| 2011 | Petrolul Ploieşti | 5 | (0) |
| 2012 | FCM Târgu Mureș | 13 | (2) |
| 2013 | Universitatea Cluj | 13 | (3) |
| 2013–2014 | UTA Arad | 17 | (3) |
| 2014 | Olimpia Satu Mare | 3 | (0) |
| Total | | 266 | (63) |

International career
| 2000 | Romania U19 | 1 | (2) |

Managerial career
- 2015–2016: Academica Clinceni (general manager)
- 2024–: Gloria Bistrița (general manager)
- * Club domestic league appearances and goals

Bogdan Radu Apostu (born 26 April 1982) is a Romanian former professional footballer who played as a forward, currently a football agent and general manager at Liga II club Gloria Bistrița.

== Career ==
Apostu grew up at Corvinul Hunedoara well known football academy and played in his career for clubs such as: Corvinul Hunedoara, Oțelul Galați, UTA Arad, Farul Constanţa, Bnei Sakhnin, Nyíregyháza Spartacus, Pandurii Târgu Jiu, Petrolul Ploieşti or Universitatea Cluj, among others.

== After retirement ==
After retirement Apostu started his career as a football agent. For almost a season he was also the general manager of Academica Clinceni. On 16 July 2024 he became the manager of CS Gloria Bistrița-Năsăud.
