= Claudiu Cornaci =

Romanian former professional footballer

Personal information
- Full name: Claudiu Mircea Cornaci
- Date of birth: 19 July 1975 (age 51)
- Place of birth: Zalău, Romania
- Height: 1.80 m (5 ft 11 in)
- Positions: Left back; left midfielder

Team information
- Current team: SCM Zalău (assistant)

Youth career
- Armătura Zalău

Senior career*
Years	Team	Apps	(Gls)
1994–1995	Armătura Zalău	33	(0)
1996	Dinamo București	5	(0)
1996–1997	Inter Sibiu	23	(0)
1997–1999	Olimpia Satu Mare	57	(4)
1999–2003	Argeș Pitești	23	(0)
2000	→ Ceahlăul Piatra Neamț (loan)	1	(0)
2001	→ Gloria Bistrița (loan)	4	(0)
2003–2005	Armătura Zalău	52	(6)
2005–2006	Liberty Salonta	26	(1)
2006–2009	Nyíregyháza Spartacus	72	(7)
2010	Szolnoki MÁV	19	(0)
2011–2013	FC Zalău		
2013–2014	CS Crasna		
Total		315	(18)

Managerial career
- 2014–: Atletic Zalău (youth)
- 2019: SCM Zalău (assistant)
- 2022–: SCM Zalău (assistant)
- * Club domestic league appearances and goals as of 17:20, 7 November 2022 (UTC)

Claudiu Mircea Cornaci (born 19 July 1975) is a Romanian former professional footballer who played as a left back or left midfielder for teams such as: Armătura Zalău, Dinamo București, Olimpia Satu Mare or Nyíregyháza Spartacus, among others. After retirement he started a football manager career and in 2018 obtained the UEFA A Licence.

== Honours ==
Olimpia Satu Mare

- Divizia B: 1997–98

Liberty Salonta

- Divizia B: 2005–06

Nyíregyháza Spartacus

- Nemzeti Bajnokság II: 2006–07
