= Sindou Dosso =

Ivorian football player

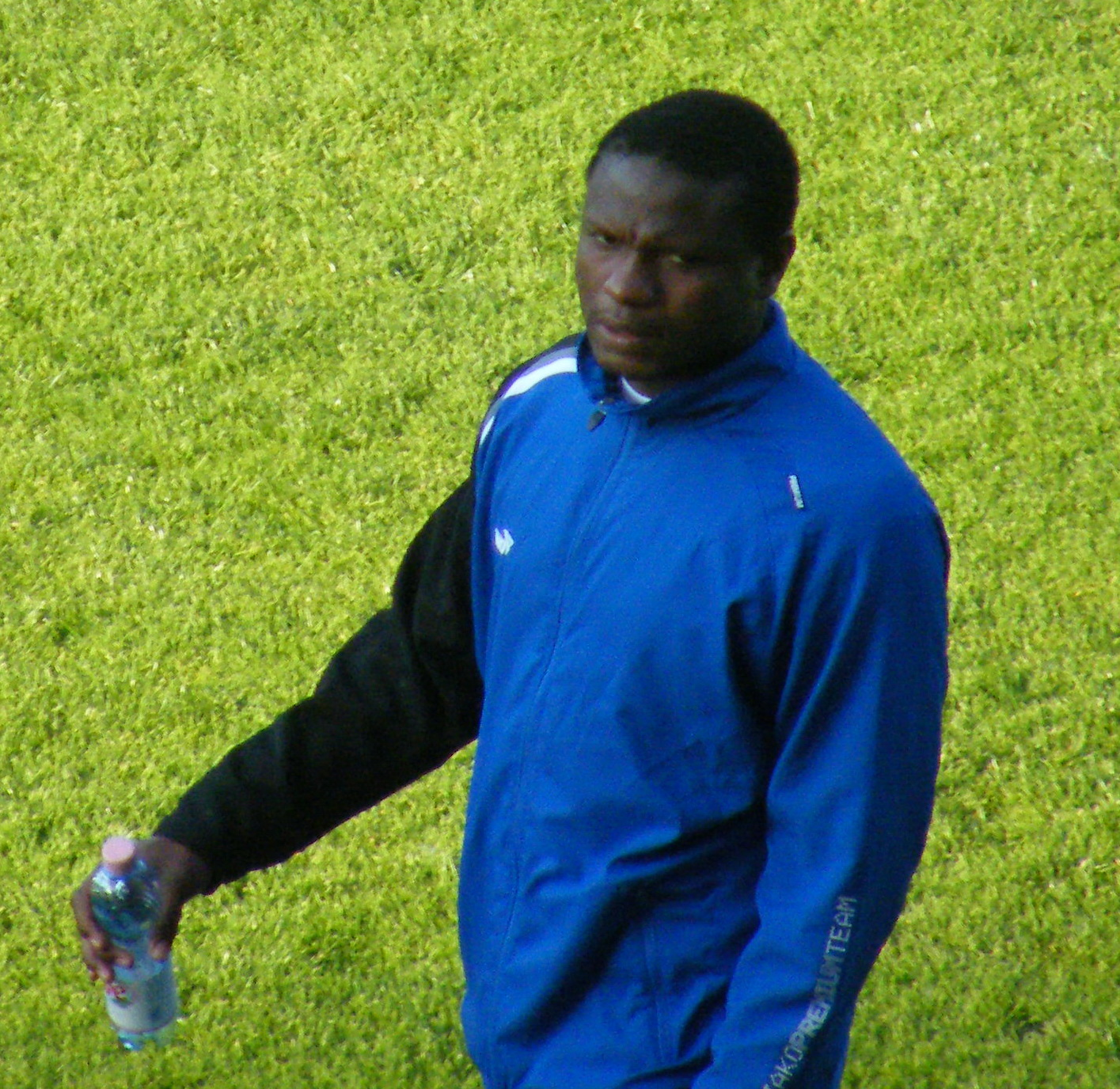

Personal information
- Full name: Sindou Dosso
- Date of birth: April 23, 1986 (age 40)
- Place of birth: Côte d'Ivoire
- Height: 1.82 m (5 ft 11 1/2 in)
- Position: Forward

Senior career*
Years	Team	Apps	(Gls)
2006–2008	Stella Club d'Adjamé	20	(9)
2008–2010	Nyíregyháza Spartacus	51	(20)
2010	→ Vecsési FC (loan)	12	(7)
2010–2012	Kecskeméti TE	31	(9)
2011–2012	→ Hapoel Rishon LeZion (loan)	5	(0)
2013–2014	UTA Arad	7	(3)
2014–	An Giang	6	(2)
- * Club domestic league appearances and goals as of 18 January 2015

Sindou Dosso (born April 23, 1986) is an Ivorian football player.
