= László Miskolczi =

Hungarian footballer

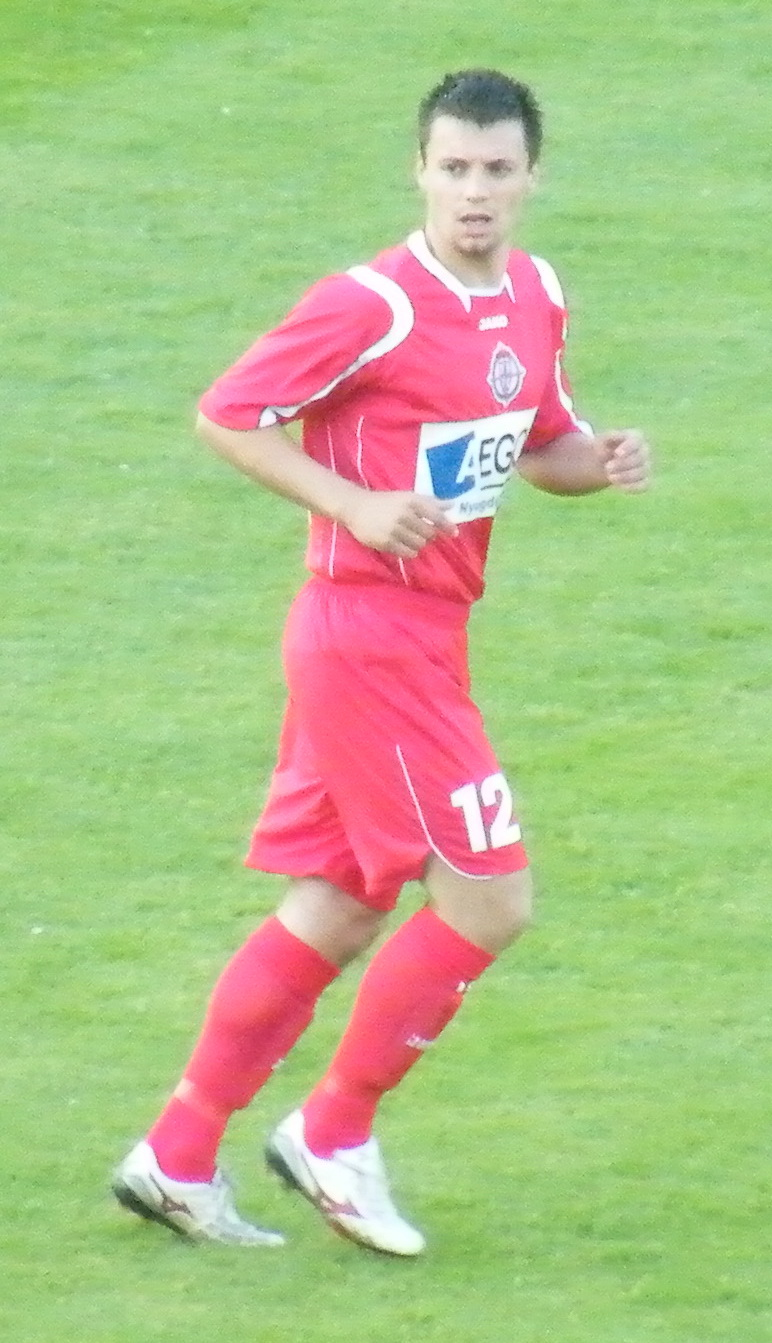

Personal information
- Full name: László Miskolczi
- Date of birth: 12 March 1986 (age 40)
- Place of birth: Nyíregyháza, Hungary
- Height: 1.75 m (5 ft 9 in)
- Position: Midfielder

Team information
- Current team: Kisvárda
- Number: 8

Youth career
- 1994–2004: Nyíregyháza
- 2002–2003: → Demecser (loan)
- 2003–2004: → Baktalórántháza (loan)

Senior career*
Years	Team	Apps	(Gls)
2004–2012	Nyíregyháza	138	(13)
2010	→ Paks (loan)	3	(0)
2012	Kemecse	14	(5)
2012–	Kisvárda	41	(8)
- * Club domestic league appearances and goals as of 1 March 2014

László Miskolczi (born 12 March 1986, in Nyíregyháza) is a Hungarian football player who currently plays for Várda SE.
