= Városi Stadion (Nyíregyháza, 1958) =

Former stadium in Nyíregyháza, Hungary

Coordinates: 47°58′13″N 21°42′46″E

Nyíregyháza Városi Stadion
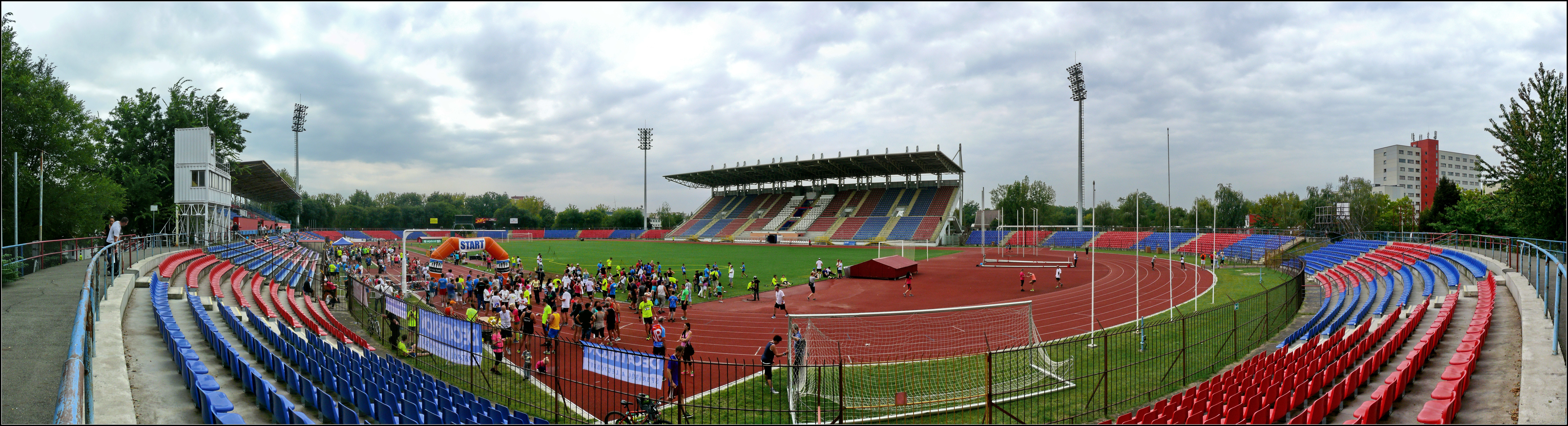
- Interactive map of Nyíregyháza Városi Stadion
- Full name: Városi Stadion
- Location: Nyíregyháza, Hungary
- Owner: City of Nyíregyháza
- Capacity: 10,500
- Surface: Grass; Field
- Field size: 105 m × 68 m (344 ft × 223 ft)

Construction
- Built: 1958
- Renovated: 1999-2002
- Demolished: 2021

Tenant
- Nyíregyháza Spartacus

Városi Stadion (literally Town Stadium) was a multi-purpose stadium in Nyíregyháza, Hungary. It was used mostly for football matches and is the home stadium of Nyíregyháza Spartacus. The stadium was able to hold 10,500 people. In 2021, the stadium was demolished to construct a new stadium in its place with a capacity of 8,000.
