= Attila Zabos =

Hungarian footballer

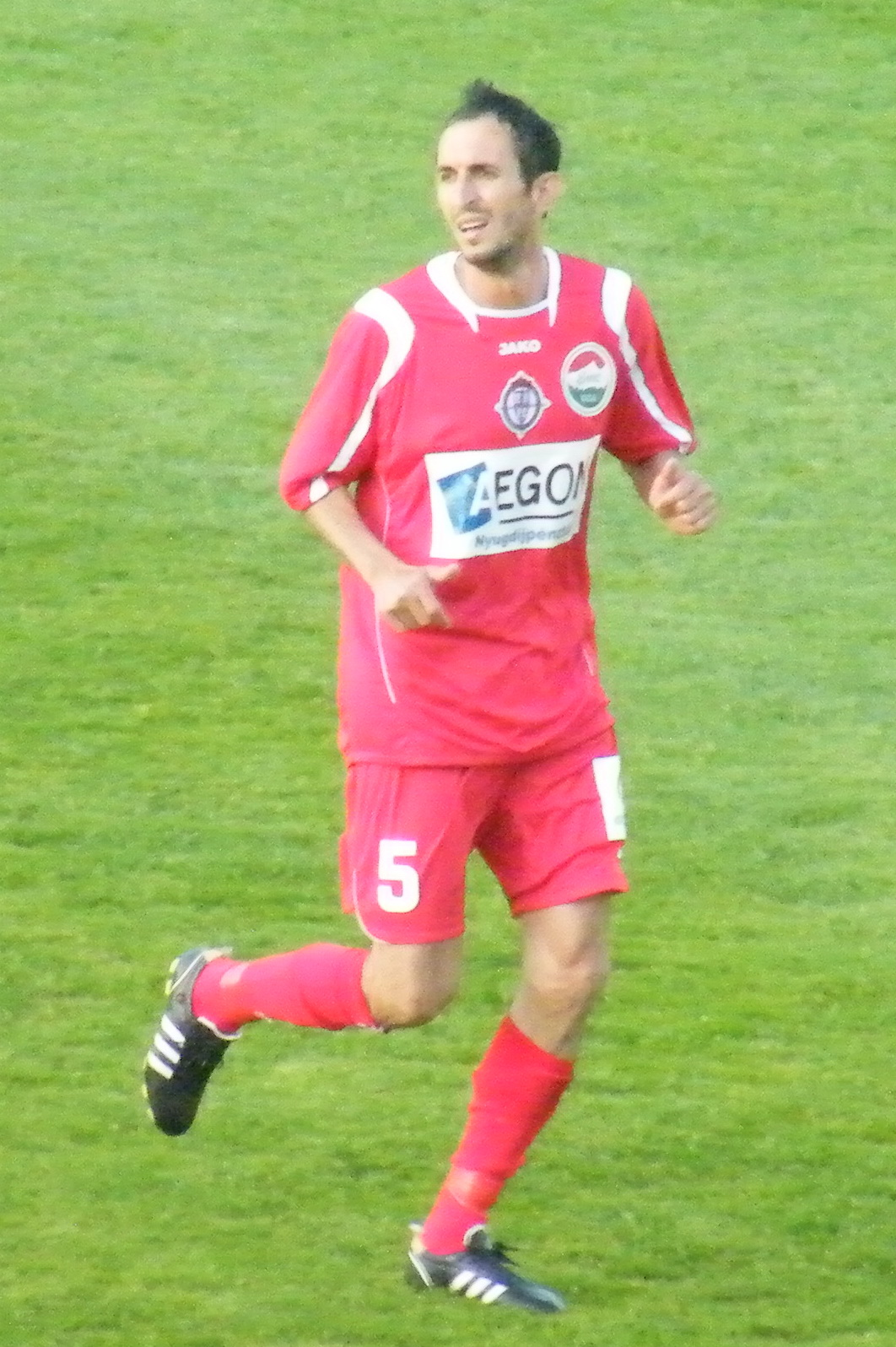

Personal information
- Full name: Attila Zabos
- Date of birth: 21 August 1980 (age 46)
- Place of birth: Kazincbarcika, Hungary
- Height: 1.79 m (5 ft 10 1/2 in)
- Position: Midfielder

Youth career
- 1992–1996: Diósgyőri VTK
- 1996–2000: Kazincbarcikai SC

Senior career*
Years	Team	Apps	(Gls)
2000–2002	Vasas SC	48	(0)
2002–2003	Kazincbarcikai SC	4	(0)
2003–2007	MTK Budapest FC	69	(5)
2007–2011	Nyíregyháza Spartacus	115	(0)
2011–2013	Putnok VSE	46	(0)
- * Club domestic league appearances and goals as of 15 May 2010

Attila Zabos (born 21 August 1980 in Kazincbarcika) is a retired Hungarian football player.
