= Bőcs =

- Village
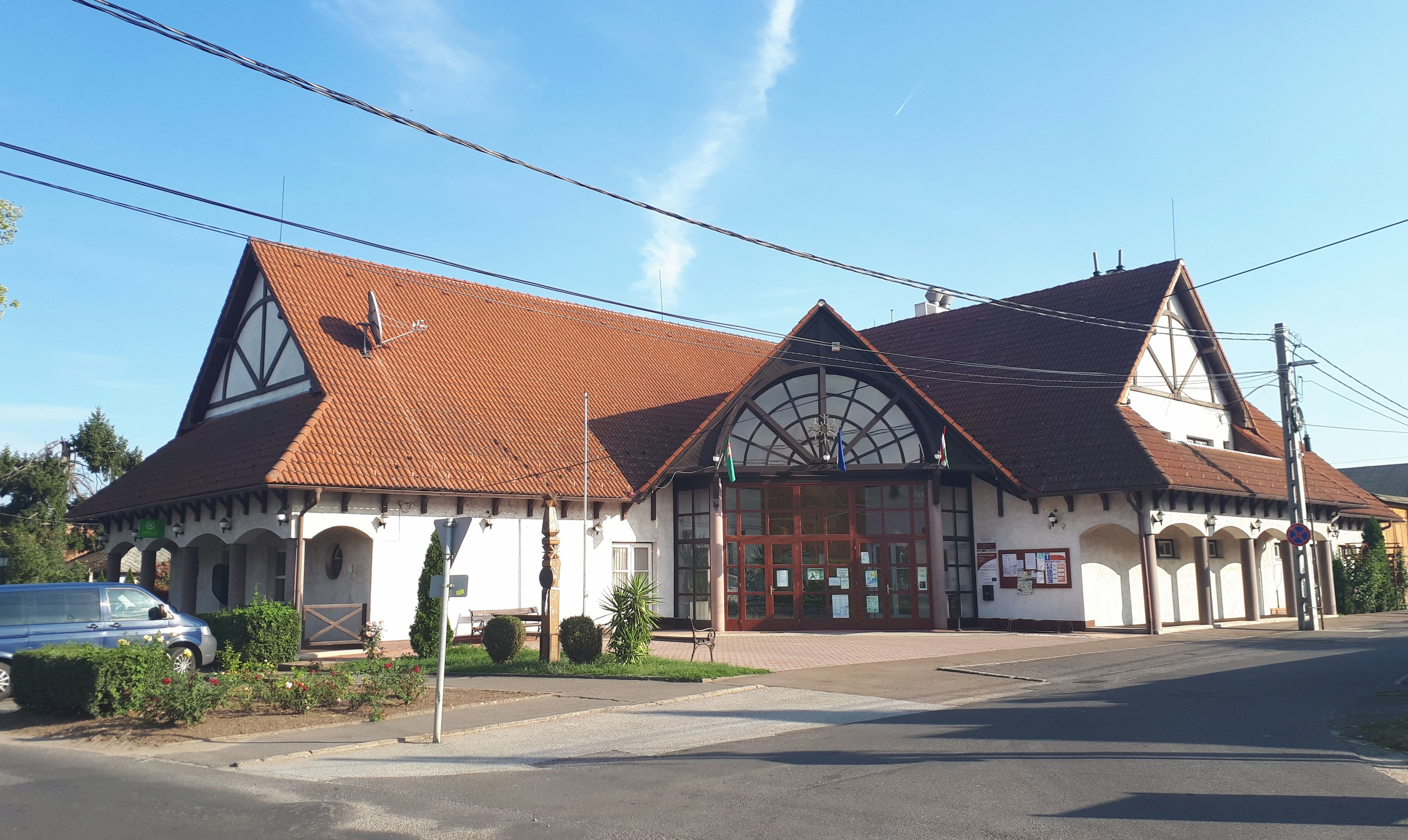

- Flag Coat of arms

- Location of Bőcs
- Coordinates: 48.03785°N 20.966181°E
- Country: Hungary
- Region: Northern Hungary
- County: Borsod-Abaúj-Zemplén
- District: Miskolc

Area
  - Total: 24.32 km^{2} (9.39 sq mi)

Population (1 January 2025)
  - Total: 2,569
  - Density: 105.6/km^{2} (273.6/sq mi)
- Time zone: UTC+1 (CET)
  - Summer (DST): UTC+2 (CEST)
- Postal code: 3574
- Area code: (+36) 46
- Website: www.bocskozseg.hu

Bőcs is a village in Borsod-Abaúj-Zemplén county, Hungary famous for the Borsod Brewery and its products.

== Notable residents ==
- Andrei Enescu (b. 1987), Romanian footballer
- Ignác Irhás (b. 1985), Hungarian footballer
- Gábor Bardi (b. 1978), Hungarian footballer
