= Bőcs KSC =

Hungarian football club

- Full name: Bőcs Községi Sport Club
- Nickname: –
- Founded: 1948
- Ground: Sportpálya, Bőcs, Hungary
- Capacity: 3,000
- Chairman: László Nagy
- Manager: Zsolt Molnár
- League: Borsod-Abaúj-Zemplén County League 2.division
- 2011–12: 1st (promoted)
Home colours	Away colours

Bőcs KSC is a Hungarian football club located in Bőcs, Hungary. It played in the Hungarian National Championship II division until 2011, when the club was moved to Balmazújváros and renamed as Balmazújvárosi FC. Böcs KSC was refounded at the summer of 2011. The team's colors are green and yellow.
