= 2012–13 Debreceni VSC season =

Debreceni VSC
2012–13 season
- Chairman: (Hungary) Gábor Szima
- Manager: (Hungary) Elemér Kondás
- NB 1: 6.
- UEFA Champions League: Third qualifying round
- Hungarian Cup: Winner
- Hungarian League Cup: Quarter-final
- Super Cup: Runners-up
- Top goalscorer: League: (France) Adamo Coulibaly (18); All: (France) Adamo Coulibaly (27)
- Highest home attendance: 10,500 v BATE (1 August 2012)
- Lowest home attendance: 100 v Eger (5 December 2012)
Home colours	Away colours

The 2012–13 season was Debreceni VSC's 35th competitive season, 20th consecutive season in the OTP Bank Liga and 110th year in existence as a football club.

== First team squad ==
Note: Flags indicate national team as defined under FIFA eligibility rules; some limited exceptions apply. Players may hold more than one non-FIFA nationality.

No.	Pos.	Nation	Player
1	GK	MNE	Vukašin Poleksić
2	DF	HUN	István Szűcs
4	DF	GER	Dajan Šimac
6	MF	HON	Luis Ramos
7	MF	HUN	Tibor Dombi
8	MF	FRA	Selim Bouadla
11	MF	HUN	János Ferenczi
15	MF	HUN	László Rezes
17	DF	HUN	Norbert Mészáros
18	DF	HUN	Péter Máté
21	DF	HUN	Bence Ludánszki
22	DF	HUN	Csaba Bernáth
26	FW	SEN	Ibrahima Sidibe

No.	Pos.	Nation	Player
27	MF	HUN	Ádám Bódi
28	DF	HUN	Zoltán Nagy
29	MF	HUN	István Spitzmüller
37	MF	BRA	Lucas
39	FW	FRA	Adamo Coulibaly
45	GK	SRB	Nenad Novaković
55	MF	HUN	Péter Szakály
60	FW	HUN	Péter Pölöskey
66	FW	HUN	Márk Szécsi
69	DF	HUN	Mihály Korhut
70	MF	HUN	Tamás Kulcsár
77	MF	HUN	Péter Czvitkovics
87	GK	HUN	István Verpecz

== Transfers ==
=== Summer ===
In: Note: Flags indicate national team as defined under FIFA eligibility rules; some limited exceptions apply. Players may hold more than one non-FIFA nationality.

No.	Pos.	Nation	Player
16	DF	HUN	Róbert Varga (from Kecskemét)
19	FW	BRA	Vinícius (loan return from Nyíregyháza)
23	MF	FRA	Slimane Bouadla (from (France) Châteauroux)
24	MF	BIH	Nenad Kiso (from (Israel) Hapoel Be'er Sheva)
26	FW	SEN	Ibrahima Sidibe (from (Belgium) Westerlo)
53	MF	HUN	Botond Birtalan (from (Romania) Bihor Oradea)
60	FW	HUN	Péter Pölöskey (from Ferencváros)
77	DF	HUN	Dávid Mohl (loan from Kecskemét)
77	MF	HUN	Péter Czvitkovics (from (Belgium) Kortrijk)

Out: Note: Flags indicate national team as defined under FIFA eligibility rules; some limited exceptions apply. Players may hold more than one non-FIFA nationality.

No.	Pos.	Nation	Player
5	MF	HUN	Gyula Illés (to Gyirmót)
6	MF	HON	Luis Ramos (to Kecskemét)
8	DF	HUN	Balázs Nikolov (to Vasas)
14	FW	NGA	Eugène Salami (loan to Kecskemét)
19	FW	BRA	Vinícius (loan to Csákvár)
24	DF	HUN	Gergő Oláh (loan to Tatabánya)
26	MF	NED	Adnan Alisic (to (Netherlands) Dordrecht)
30	FW	BIH	Stevo Nikolić (loan to (Slovakia) Spartak Trnava)
77	DF	HUN	Dávid Mohl (loan return to Kecskemét)

=== Winter ===
In: Note: Flags indicate national team as defined under FIFA eligibility rules; some limited exceptions apply. Players may hold more than one non-FIFA nationality.

No.	Pos.	Nation	Player
6	MF	HON	Luis Ramos (from Kecskemét)
30	FW	BIH	Stevo Nikolić (loan return from (Slovakia) Spartak Trnava)
—	DF	FRA	Mamadou Wague (from (France) Metz)

Out: Note: Flags indicate national team as defined under FIFA eligibility rules; some limited exceptions apply. Players may hold more than one non-FIFA nationality.

No.	Pos.	Nation	Player
10	FW	HUN	Balázs Farkas (to Győr)
16	DF	HUN	Róbert Varga (to Kecskemét)
20	MF	CMR	Mbengono Yannick (to Kecskemét)
24	MF	BIH	Nenad Kiso (to (Azerbaijan) Simurq)
33	MF	HUN	József Varga (loan to (Germany) Greuther Fürth)
53	MF	HUN	Botond Birtalan (to Kozármisleny)
99	MF	GAB	Roguy Méyé

- List of Hungarian football transfers summer 2012
- List of Hungarian football transfers winter 2012–13

== Competitions ==
=== Super Cup ===
11 July 2012	Videoton	1–1 (a.e.t.) (5–3 p)	Debrecen	Székesfehérvár
20:15 CEST	Kovács 72'	Report	Bódi 2'	Stadium: Sóstói Stadion; Attendance: 5,000; Referee: (Hungary) Tamás Bognár
	Penalties
	Nikolić (penalty scored); Mitrović (penalty scored); Gyurcsó (penalty scored); Brachi (penalty scored); Caneira (penalty scored)		Szakály (penalty scored); Korhut (penalty scored); Sidibe (penalty scored); Bódi (penalty missed)

=== Nemzeti Bajnokság I ===
==== Classification ====
Pos	Team	Pld	W	D	L	GF	GA	GD	Pts	Qualification or relegation
4	MTK	30	15	6	9	43	30	+13	51	
5	Ferencváros	30	13	10	7	51	36	+15	49	
6	Debrecen	30	14	4	12	47	36	+11	46	Qualification for Europa League second qualifying round (Note: Debrecen qualified for the Europa League second qualifying round as the 2012–13 Magyar Kupa winners.)
7	Kecskemét	30	12	8	10	42	42	0	44	
8	Haladás	30	11	11	8	36	27	+9	44	

Source: mlsz.hu (in Hungarian)
Rules for classification: 1st points; 2nd overall wins; 3rd goal difference; 4th head-to-head points; 5th head-to-head goal difference; 6th head-to-head away goals scored; 7th fair-play points; 8th drawing of lots

==== Results summary ====
Overall								Home						Away					
Pld	W	D	L	GF	GA	GD	Pts	W	D	L	GF	GA	GD	W	D	L	GF	GA	GD
30	14	4	12	47	36	+11	46	11	0	4	32	14	+18	3	4	8	15	22	−7

Last updated: 2 June 2013.
Source: NB1

==== Results by round ====
Round	1	2	3	4	5	6	7	8	9	10	11	12	13	14	15	16	17	18	19	20	21	22	23	24	25	26	27	28	29	30
Ground	H	A	H	A	H	A	H	A	H	A	H	A	H	A	H	A	H	A	H	A	H	A	H	A	H	A	H	A	H	A
Result	W	L	W	W	W	D	W	L	W	W	W	L	L	L	L	L	W	D	W	L	L	D	W	L	W	D	W	W	L	L
Position	1	6	3	2	2	3	2	3	2	2	2	2	2	2	3	3	3	3	3	4	5	5	5	5	4	6	5	5	6	6

Updated to match(es) played on 2 June 2013. Source: Matches
A = Away; H = Home; W = Win; D = Draw; L = Loss

==== Matches ====
28 July 2012 1	Debrecen	4–1	Győr	Debrecen
19:00 CEST	Sidibe 8', 26'; Szakály 10'; Kulcsár 45'	Report	Andrić 11'	Stadium: Stadion Oláh Gábor Út; Attendance: 5,000; Referee: (Hungary) Viktor Kassai

4 August 2012 2	Kaposvár	1–0	Debrecen	Kaposvár
17:00 CEST	Zámbó 27'	Report		Stadium: Stadion Kaposvár Rákóczi; Attendance: 2,500; Referee: (Hungary) István Vad

11 August 2012 3	Debrecen	2–1	Kecskemét	Debrecen
17:00 CEST	Kulcsár 23'; Coulibaly 73'	Report	Vaskó 53'	Stadium: Stadion Oláh Gábor Út; Attendance: 4,500; Referee: (Hungary) Ádám Farkas

18 August 2012 4	Pécs	2–3	Debrecen	Pécs
18:30 CEST	Okoronkwo 47'; Krejčí 61'	Report	Coulibaly 70' (pen.), 75', 79'	Stadium: Stadion PMFC; Attendance: 4,000; Referee: (Hungary) Sándor Andó-Szabó

26 August 2012 5	Debrecen	1–0	Pápa	Debrecen
16:30 CEST	Szakály 77'	Report		Stadium: Stadion Oláh Gábor Út; Attendance: 2,500; Referee: (Hungary) János Takács

2 September 2012 6	Újpest	0–0	Debrecen	Budapest
16:30 CEST		Report		Stadium: Szusza Ferenc Stadium; Attendance: 3,000; Referee: (Hungary) Mihály Fábián

16 September 2012 7	Debrecen	4–1	Budapest Honvéd	Debrecen
18:30 CEST	Sidibe 5', 64'; Coulibaly 8'; Szűcs 53'	Report	Vernes 21'	Stadium: Stadion Oláh Gábor Út; Attendance: 5,500; Referee: (Hungary) Tamás Bognár

22 September 2012 8	Eger	1–0	Debrecen	Miskolc
16:00 CEST	Németh 56'	Report		Stadium: DVTK Stadion; Attendance: 250; Referee: (Hungary) Gergely Szőts

29 September 2012 9	Debrecen	2–0	Szombathely	Debrecen
16:00 CEST	Rezes 38'; Kulcsár 80'	Report		Stadium: Stadion Oláh Gábor Út; Attendance: 4,000; Referee: (Hungary) Zoltán Iványi

7 October 2012 10	Siófok	0–2	Debrecen	Siófok
18:30 CEST		Report	Coulibaly 33' (pen.); Bódi 62'	Stadium: Révész Street Stadium; Attendance: 500; Referee: (Hungary) Ádám Radványi

21 October 2012 11	Debrecen	2–0	Diósgyőr	Debrecen
16:30 CEST	Yannick 24'; Coulibaly 77'	Report		Stadium: Stadion Oláh Gábor Út; Attendance: 9,500; Referee: (Hungary) Zsolt Szabó

28 October 2012 12	Videoton	3–1	Debrecen	Székesfehérvár
16:30 CEST	Torghelle 22'; Oliveira 61'; Nikolić 75'	Report	Coulibaly 65'	Stadium: Sóstói Stadion; Attendance: 6,000; Referee: (Hungary) Viktor Kassai

3 November 2012 13	Debrecen	0–1	Paks	Debrecen
18:30 CET		Report	Tököli 63'	Stadium: Stadion Oláh Gábor Út; Attendance: 5,000; Referee: (Hungary) Szabolcs Szilasi

11 November 2012 14	Ferencváros	2–1	Debrecen	Budapest
16:30 CET	Böde 34'; Józsi 90' (pen.)	Report	Coulibaly 10'	Stadium: Stadion Albert Flórián; Attendance: 7,943; Referee: (Hungary) Mihály Fábián

17 November 2012 15	Debrecen	0–2	MTK Budapest	Debrecen
16:00 CET		Report	Kanta 9'; Korhut 77' (o.g.)	Stadium: Stadion Oláh Gábor Út; Attendance: 6,000; Referee: (Hungary) István Vad

23 November 2012 16	Győr	2–0	Debrecen	Győr
14:00 CET	Varga 46'; Dudás 90+3'	Report		Stadium: ETO Park; Attendance: 6,000; Referee: (Hungary) Zsolt Szabó

30 November 2012 17	Debrecen	2–1	Kaposvár	Debrecen
17:00 CET	Coulibaly 49' (pen.), 62'	Report	Pavlović 90+2'	Stadium: Stadion Oláh Gábor Út; Attendance: 1,500; Referee: (Hungary) Sándor Andó-Szabó

2 February 2013 18	Kecskemét	0–0	Debrecen	Kecskemét
14:00 CET		Report		Stadium: Széktói Stadion; Attendance: 1,500; Referee: (Hungary) István Vad

10 March 2013 19	Debrecen	4–1	Pécs	Debrecen
18:30 CET	Pölöskey 31'; Sidibe 64', 89'; Szakály 84' (pen.)	Report	Grumić 15'	Stadium: Stadion Oláh Gábor Út; Attendance: 1,500; Referee: (Hungary) Ádám Németh

10 April 2013 20	Pápa	1–0	Debrecen	Pápa
18:00 CEST	Tóth 65'	Report		Stadium: Stadion Várkerti; Attendance: 800; Referee: (Hungary) Gábor Oláh

31 March 2013 21	Debrecen	0–1	Újpest	Debrecen
16:30 CEST		Report	Šimac 9' (o.g.)	Stadium: Stadion Oláh Gábor Út; Attendance: 2,500; Referee: (Hungary) Tamás Bognár

7 April 2013 22	Budapest Honvéd	2–2	Debrecen	Budapest
26:30 CEST	Nagy 5'; Martínez 76' (pen.)	Report	Pölöskey 34'; Ignjatović 44' (o.g.)	Stadium: Bozsik Stadion; Attendance: 1,000; Referee: (Hungary) Ádám Farkas

13 April 2013 23	Debrecen	3–0	Eger	Debrecen
14:00 CEST	Sidibe 33'; Bouadla 75'; Coulibaly 80'	Report		Stadium: Stadion Oláh Gábor Út; Attendance: 2,000; Referee: (Hungary) Szabolcs Szilasi

21 April 2012 24	Szombathely	1–0	Debrecen	Szombathely
18:30 CEST	Halmosi 51'	Report		Stadium: Rohonci úti Stadion; Attendance: 2,459; Referee: (Hungary) Zoltán Iványi

27 April 2013 25	Debrecen	4–1	Siófok	Debrecen
18:30 CEST	Sidibe 2'; Coulibaly 25', 44', 53'	Report	Dajić 62'	Stadium: Stadion Oláh Gábor Út; Attendance: 3,000; Referee: (Hungary) Tamás Bognár

4 May 2013 26	Diósgyőr	3–3	Debrecen	Miskolc
14:00 CEST	Fernando 40'; Luque 77' (pen.); Gallardo 81'	Report	Kulcsár 23'; Coulibaly 62'; Bódi 66'	Stadium: DVTK Stadion; Attendance: 6,000; Referee: (Hungary) Viktor Kassai

12 May 2013 27	Debrecen	2–1	Videoton	Debrecen
16:30 CEST	Bódi 39'; Kulcsár 57'	Report	Torghelle 29'	Stadium: Stadion Oláh Gábor Út; Attendance: 5,000; Referee: (Hungary) István Vad

17 May 2013 28	Paks	1–2	Debrecen	Paks
19:00 CEST	Bartha 33'	Report	Korhut 53'; Mészáros 86'	Stadium: Stadion PSE; Attendance: 1,000; Referee: (Hungary) Ádám Farkas

26 May 2013 29	Debrecen	2–3	Ferencváros	Debrecen
16:30 CEST	Coulibaly 32' (pen.), 90' (pen.)	Report	Somália 6'; Jenner 36'; Perić 83'	Stadium: Stadion Oláh Gábor Út; Attendance: 9,000; Referee: (Hungary) Tamás Bognár

1 June 2013 30	MTK Budapest	3–1	Debrecen	Budapest
16:00 CEST	Kálnoki-Kis 20'; Kanta 52'; Vass 70'	Report	Bódi 86'	Stadium: Hidegkuti Nándor Stadium; Attendance: 1,400; Referee: (Hungary) Szabolcs Szilasi

=== Hungarian Cup ===
31 October 2012 Round 3	Szentlőrinc	1–3	Debrecen	Szentlőrinc
12:30 CET	Zámbó 20'	Report	Lucas 48'; Gál 82'; Kulcsár 90+1'	Stadium: Városi Sporttelep; Attendance: 600; Referee: (Hungary) István Mészáros

21 November 2012 Round of 16 (1st leg)	Nyíregyháza	3–2	Debrecen	Nyíregyháza
17:30 CET	Pákolicz 54'; Csorba 87'; Benkő 90'	Report	Ludánszki 37'; Szakály 65'	Stadium: Városi Stadion; Attendance: 2,000; Referee: (Hungary) József Berger

27 November 2012 Round of 16 (2nd leg)	Debrecen	3–1 (5–4 agg.)	Nyíregyháza	Debrecen
17:00 CET	Coulibaly 16', 63'; Szakály 60'	Report	Minczér 51'	Stadium: Stadion Oláh Gábor Út; Attendance: 3,000; Referee: (Hungary) Gábor Oláh

3 February 2013 Quarter-final (1st leg)	Létavértes	0–2	Debrecen	Létavértes
14:00 CET		Report	Dombi 24'; Šimac 32'	Stadium: Stadion Debreceni Street; Attendance: 500; Referee: (Hungary) László Varga

6 February 2013 Quarter-final (2nd leg)	Debrecen	8–0 (10–0 agg.)	Létavértes	Debrecen
13:00 CET	Ludánszki 10'; Szakály 34'; Coulibaly 56', 80'; Pölöskey 69', 76', 87'; Bódi 72'	Report		Stadium: Stadion Oláh Gábor Út; Attendance: 500; Referee: (Hungary) István Vad

16 April 2013 Semi-final (1st leg)	Vasas	0–3	Debrecen	Budapest
18:00 CEST		Report	Ferenczi 8' (pen.), 19' (pen.); Czvitkovics 68'	Stadium: Stadion Rudolf Illovszky; Attendance: 1,200; Referee: (Hungary) Ádám Németh

7 May 2013 Semi-final (2nd leg)	Debrecen	3–1 (6–1 agg.)	Vasas	Debrecen
18:00 CEST	Coulibaly 54', 77'; Sidibe 89'	Report	Berecz 27'	Stadium: Stadion Oláh Gábor Út; Attendance: 800; Referee: (Hungary) Csaba Pintér

22 May 2013 Final	Debrecen	2–1	Győr	Budapest
20:00 CEST	Coulibaly 51', 86'	Report	Andrić 17'	Stadium: Bozsik Stadion; Attendance: 5,000; Referee: (Hungary) Viktor Kassai

=== League Cup ===
==== Group stage ====
5 September 2012 1	Eger	1–3	Debrecen	Eger
17:00 CEST	Németh 23'	Report	Lucas 11'; Ferenczi 28'; Rezes 45'	Stadium: Szentmarjay Tibor Városi Stadion; Attendance: 300; Referee: (Hungary) Ferenc Karakó

8 September 2012 2	Debrecen	5–2	Diósgyőr	Debrecen
16:00 CEST	Czvitkovics 40'; Sidibe 56', 86'; Szűcs 61'; Kulcsár 76'	Report	Tisza 36'; Bacsa 79'	Stadium: Stadion Oláh Gábor Út; Attendance: 1,500; Referee: (Hungary) Ádám Németh

10 October 2012 3	Újpest	2–1	Debrecen	Budapest
17:00 CEST	Toricska 41', 62'	Report	Kulcsár 48' (pen.)	Stadium: Szusza Ferenc Stadium; Attendance: 300; Referee: (Hungary) János Takács

14 October 2012 4	Debrecen	3–0	Újpest	Debrecen
18:30 CEST	Korhut 28' (pen.), 70'; Coulibaly 37'	Report		Stadium: Stadion Oláh Gábor Út; Attendance: 1,200; Referee: (Hungary) Gábor Oláh

13 November 2012 5	Diósgyőr	0–1	Debrecen	Miskolc
17:00 CET		Report	Kulcsár 15'	Stadium: DVTK Stadion; Attendance: 1,000; Referee: (Hungary) József Erdős

5 December 2012 6	Debrecen	0–1	Eger	Debrecen
13:00 CEST		Report	Németh 2'	Stadium: Stadion Oláh Gábor Út; Attendance: 100; Referee: (Hungary) Ádám Németh

===== Classification =====
Pos	Team	Pld	W	D	L	GF	GA	GD	Pts	Qualification
1	Debrecen	6	4	0	2	13	6	+7	12	Advance to knockout phase
2	Eger	6	4	0	2	13	9	+4	12	Advance to knockout phase
3	Diósgyőr	6	2	0	4	11	13	−2	6	
4	Újpest	6	2	0	4	9	18	−9	6	

Rules for classification: 1) points; 2) goal difference; 3) number of goals scored.

==== Knockout phase ====
20 February 2013 Quarter-final (1st leg)	Videoton	1–0	Debrecen	Székesfehérvár
16:45 CET	Nikolić 62' (pen.)	Report		Stadium: Sóstói Stadion; Attendance: 3,000; Referee: (Hungary) Zoltán Iványi

6 March 2013 Quarter-final (2nd leg)	Debrecen	0–0 (0–1 agg.)	Videoton	Debrecen
18:00 CET		Report		Stadium: Stadion Oláh Gábor Út; Attendance: 2,000; Referee: (Hungary) Ádám Farkas

=== Champions League ===
The First and Second Qualifying Round draws took place at UEFA headquarters in Nyon, Switzerland on 25 June 2012.

17 July 2012 Q2 Leg 1	Skënderbeu Korçë (Albania)	1–0	(Hungary) Debrecen	Korçë
20:30 CEST	Plaku 65'	Report		Stadium: Skënderbeu Stadium; Attendance: 7,000; Referee: (Bulgaria) Nikolay Yordanov

24 July 2012 Q2 Leg 2	Debrecen (Hungary)	3–0 (3–1 agg.)	(Albania) Skënderbeu Korçë	Nyíregyháza
20:30 CEST	Coulibaly 12', 87'; Varga 58'	Report		Stadium: Városi Stadion; Attendance: 9,000; Referee: (Estonia) Kristo Tohver

1 August 2012 Q3 Leg 1	BATE Borisov (Belarus)	1–1	(Hungary) Debrecen	Barysaw
18:00 CEST	Sidibe 90+3' (o.g.)	Report	Sidibe 67'	Stadium: Haradski Stadium; Attendance: 5,600; Referee: (Switzerland) Sascha Kever

7 August 2012 Q3 Leg 2	Debrecen (Hungary)	0–2 (1–3 agg.)	(Belarus) BATE Borisov	Nyíregyháza
20:30 CEST		Report	Mazalewski 25'; Valadzko 59'	Stadium: Városi Stadion; Attendance: 10,500; Referee: (Israel) Liran Liany

=== Europa League ===
23 August 2012 Play off Leg 1	Debrecen (Hungary)	0–3	(Belgium) Club Brugge	Nyíregyháza
20:30 CEST		Report	Blondel 58'; Refaelov 77'; Bacca 90+1'	Stadium: Városi Stadion; Attendance: 6,000; Referee: (Slovenia) Matej Jug

30 August 2012 Play off Leg 2	Club Brugge (Belgium)	4–1 (7–1 agg.)	(Hungary) Debrecen	Bruges
20:00 CEST	Larsen 25'; Vázquez 48'; Tchité 50'; Bacca 66'	Report	Szakály 34'	Stadium: Jan Breydel Stadium; Attendance: 18,353; Referee: (Germany) Deniz Aytekin

== Statistics ==
=== Appearances and goals ===
Last updated on 2 June 2013.

No.	Pos	Nat	Player	Total		OTP Bank Liga		Champions League		Hungarian Cup		League Cup	
No.	Pos	Nat	Player	Apps	Goals	Apps	Goals	Apps	Goals	Apps	Goals	Apps	Goals
1	GK	(Montenegro) MNE	Vukašin Poleksić	8	-11	3	-3	1	-3	3	-4	1	-1
2	DF	(Hungary) HUN	István Szűcs	20	2	11	1	0	0	6	0	3	1
4	DF	(Germany) GER	Dajan Šimac	32	1	20	0	6	0	3	1	3	0
6	MF	(Honduras) HON	Luis Ramos	20	0	12	0	5	0	2	0	1	0
7	MF	(Hungary) HUN	Tibor Dombi	19	1	11	0	0	0	3	1	5	0
8	MF	(France) FRA	Selim Bouadla	19	1	14	1	0	0	3	0	2	0
11	MF	(Hungary) HUN	János Ferenczi	22	3	14	0	0	0	5	2	3	1
15	MF	(Hungary) HUN	László Rezes	26	2	13	1	6	0	2	0	5	1
17	DF	(Hungary) HUN	Norbert Mészáros	32	1	24	1	6	0	0	0	2	0
18	DF	(Hungary) HUN	Péter Máté	18	0	11	0	4	0	2	0	1	0
21	DF	(Hungary) HUN	Bence Ludánszki	13	2	1	0	0	0	7	2	5	0
22	DF	(Hungary) HUN	Csaba Bernáth	21	0	15	0	0	0	2	0	4	0
26	FW	(Senegal) SEN	Ibrahima Sidibe	39	12	27	8	4	1	3	1	5	2
27	MF	(Hungary) HUN	Ádám Bódi	38	5	26	4	6	0	4	1	2	0
28	DF	(Hungary) HUN	Zoltán Nagy	27	0	15	0	4	0	2	0	6	0
29	MF	(Hungary) HUN	István Spitzmüller	24	0	13	0	1	0	4	0	6	0
37	MF	(Brazil) BRA	Lucas	13	2	3	0	2	0	3	1	5	1
39	FW	(France) FRA	Adamo Coulibaly	40	27	27	18	6	2	4	6	3	1
45	GK	(Serbia) SRB	Nenad Novaković	3	-2	1	-1	2	-1	0	0	0	0
55	MF	(Hungary) HUN	Péter Szakály	29	7	19	3	6	1	3	3	1	0
60	FW	(Hungary) HUN	Péter Pölöskey	21	5	13	2	0	0	5	3	3	0
66	FW	(Hungary) HUN	Márk Szécsi	19	0	11	0	0	0	4	0	4	0
69	MF	(Hungary) HUN	Mihály Korhut	38	3	26	1	5	0	2	0	5	2
70	MF	(Hungary) HUN	Tamás Kulcsár	28	9	17	5	3	0	2	1	6	3
77	MF	(Hungary) HUN	Péter Czvitkovics	28	2	17	0	0	0	6	1	5	1
87	GK	(Hungary) HUN	István Verpecz	39	-42	27	-29	3	-7	4	-2	5	-4
Youth players:
5	MF	(Hungary) HUN	Mátyás Gál	4	1	0	0	0	0	2	1	2	0
14	MF	(Hungary) HUN	Krisztián Kuti	3	0	0	0	0	0	3	0	0	0
23	MF	(France) FRA	Slimane Bouadla	5	0	0	0	0	0	1	0	4	0
30	MF	(Hungary) HUN	Alex Engel	4	0	0	0	0	0	3	0	1	0
89	GK	(Hungary) HUN	Gergő Szécsi	2	-2	0	0	0	0	0	0	2	-2
92	DF	(Hungary) HUN	István Albert	1	0	0	0	0	0	1	0	0	0
Players out to loan:
19	FW	(Brazil) BRA	Vinícius	1	0	1	0	0	0	0	0	0	0
24	DF	(Hungary) HUN	Gergő Oláh	1	0	1	0	0	0	0	0	0	0
30	FW	(Bosnia and Herzegovina) BIH	Stevo Nikolić	1	0	1	0	0	0	0	0	0	0
33	MF	(Hungary) HUN	József Varga	20	1	14	0	5	1	1	0	0	0
Players no longer at the club:
8	DF	(Hungary) HUN	Balázs Nikolov	4	0	1	0	3	0	0	0	0	0
14	FW	(Hungary) HUN	Szabolcs Csorba	1	0	1	0	0	0	0	0	0	0
16	DF	(Hungary) HUN	Róbert Varga	5	0	1	0	0	0	0	0	4	0
20	MF	(Cameroon) CMR	Mbengono Yannick	12	1	5	1	3	0	1	0	3	0
24	MF	(Bosnia and Herzegovina) BIH	Nenad Kiso	4	0	0	0	0	0	2	0	2	0
53	FW	(Hungary) HUN	Botond Birtalan	1	0	0	0	0	0	0	0	1	0
77	DF	(Hungary) HUN	Dávid Mohl	2	0	0	0	2	0	0	0	0	0
99	FW	(Gabon) GAB	Roguy Méyé	1	0	0	0	0	0	0	0	1	0

=== Top scorers ===
Includes all competitive matches. The list is sorted by shirt number when total goals are equal.

Last updated on 2 June 2013

Position	Nation	Number	Name	OTP Bank Liga	Champions League	Hungarian Cup	League Cup	Total
1	(France)	39	Adamo Coulibaly	18	2	6	1	27
2	(Senegal)	26	Ibrahima Sidibe	8	1	1	2	12
3	(Hungary)	70	Tamás Kulcsár	5	0	1	3	9
4	(Hungary)	55	Péter Szakály	3	1	3	0	7
5	(Hungary)	27	Ádám Bódi	4	0	1	0	5
6	(Hungary)	60	Péter Pölöskey	2	0	3	0	5
7	(Hungary)	69	Mihály Korhut	1	0	0	2	3
8	(Hungary)	11	János Ferenczi	0	0	2	1	3
9	(Hungary)	2	István Szűcs	1	0	0	1	2
10	(Hungary)	15	László Rezes	1	0	0	1	2
11	(Hungary)	21	Bence Ludánszki	0	0	2	0	2
12	(Brazil)	37	Lucas	0	0	1	1	2
13	(Hungary)	77	Péter Czvitkovics	0	0	1	1	2
14	(Hungary)	33	József Varga	0	1	0	0	1
15	(Cameroon)	20	Mbengono Yannick	1	0	0	0	1
16	(France)	8	Selim Bouadla	1	0	0	0	1
17	(Hungary)	17	norbert Mészáros	1	0	0	0	1
18	(Hungary)	5	Mátyás Gál	0	0	1	0	1
19	(Hungary)	7	Tibor Dombi	0	0	1	0	1
20	(Germany)	4	Dajan Šimac	0	0	1	0	1
/	/	/	Own Goals	1	0	0	0	1
			TOTALS	47	5	24	13	89

=== Disciplinary record ===
Includes all competitive matches. Players with 1 card or more included only.

Last updated on 2 June 2013

Position	Nation	Number	Name	OTP Bank Liga		Champions League		Hungarian Cup		League Cup		Total (Hu Total)	
Position	Nation	Number	Name	Booked	Sent off (straight red)	Booked	Sent off (straight red)	Booked	Sent off (straight red)	Booked	Sent off (straight red)	Booked	Sent off (straight red)
DF	(Hungary)	2	István Szűcs	2	0	0	0	0	0	0	0	2 (2)	0 (0)
DF	(Germany)	4	Dajan Šimac	3	0	1	0	2	0	2	0	8 (3)	0 (0)
MF	(Honduras)	6	Luis Ramos	3	0	2	1	0	0	0	1	5 (3)	2 (0)
MF	(France)	8	Selim Bouadla	2	0	0	0	0	0	2	0	4 (2)	0 (0)
DF	(Hungary)	8	Balázs Nikolov	0	0	0	1	0	0	0	0	0 (0)	1 (0)
MF	(Hungary)	11	János Ferenczi	3	0	0	0	1	0	2	0	6 (3)	0 (0)
MF	(Hungary)	15	László Rezes	2	0	0	1	0	0	0	0	2 (2)	1 (0)
DF	(Hungary)	16	Róbert Varga	0	0	0	0	0	0	1	0	1 (0)	0 (0)
DF	(Hungary)	17	Norbert Mészáros	2	0	1	0	0	0	0	0	3 (2)	0 (0)
DF	(Hungary)	18	Péter Máté	4	1	0	0	0	0	0	0	4 (4)	1 (1)
MF	(Cameroon)	20	Mbengono Yannick	0	0	1	0	0	0	0	0	1 (0)	0 (0)
DF	(Hungary)	21	Bence Ludánszki	0	0	0	0	2	0	1	0	3 (0)	0 (0)
DF	(Hungary)	22	Csaba Bernáth	1	0	0	0	1	0	1	0	3 (1)	0 (0)
FW	(Senegal)	26	Ibrahima Sidibe	1	0	0	0	0	0	0	0	1 (1)	0 (0)
MF	(Hungary)	27	Ádám Bódi	5	0	1	0	0	0	1	0	7 (5)	0 (0)
DF	(Hungary)	28	Zoltán Nagy	6	1	0	0	1	0	0	0	7 (6)	1 (1)
MF	(Hungary)	29	István Spitzmüller	3	0	0	0	0	0	1	0	4 (3)	0 (0)
MF	(Hungary)	33	József Varga	0	0	4	0	0	0	0	0	4 (0)	0 (0)
MF	(Brazil)	37	Lucas	1	0	0	0	0	0	1	0	2 (1)	0 (0)
FW	(France)	39	Adamo Coulibaly	4	0	2	0	0	0	0	0	6 (4)	0 (0)
MF	(Hungary)	55	Péter Szakály	5	0	0	0	0	0	0	0	5 (5)	0 (0)
FW	(Hungary)	60	Péter Pölöskey	1	0	0	0	1	0	0	1	2 (1)	1 (0)
FW	(Hungary)	66	Márk Szécsi	0	0	0	0	0	0	1	0	1 (0)	0 (0)
DF	(Hungary)	69	Mihály Korhut	6	1	3	0	1	0	1	0	11 (6)	1 (1)
MF	(Hungary)	70	Tamás Kulcsár	0	0	0	0	0	0	0	1	0 (0)	1 (0)
MF	(Hungary)	77	Péter Czvitkovics	0	0	0	0	0	0	2	0	2 (0)	0 (0)
			TOTALS	54	3	15	3	9	0	16	3	94 (54)	9 (3)

=== Overall ===
Games played	51 (30 OTP Bank Liga, 6 UEFA CL and EL, 7 Hungarian Cup and 8 Hungarian League Cup)
Games won	25 (14 OTP Bank Liga, 1 UEFA CL and EL, 6 Hungarian Cup and 4 Hungarian League Cup)
Games drawn	6 (4 OTP Bank Liga, 1 UEFA CL and EL, 0 Hungarian Cup and 1 Hungarian League Cup)
Games lost	20 (12 OTP Bank Liga, 4 UEFA CL and EL, 1 Hungarian Cup and 3 Hungarian League Cup)
Goals scored	89
Goals conceded	60
Goal difference	+29
Yellow cards	94
Red cards	9
Worst discipline	(Hungary) Mihály Korhut (11 (yellow card) , 1 (red card) )
Best result	8–0 (H) v Létavértes SC - Hungarian Cup - 06-02-2013
Worst result	0–3 (H) v Club Brugge K.V. - UEFA Europa League - 23-08-2012
Worst result	1–4 (A) v Club Brugge K.V. - UEFA Europa League - 30-08-2012
Most appearances	(France) Adamo Coulibaly (40 appearances)
Top scorer	(France) Adamo Coulibaly (27 goals)
Points	81/153 (52.94%)

Last updated: 2 June 2013
