= 2014–15 Debreceni VSC season =

Debreceni VSC
2014–15 season
- Chairman: (Hungary) Gábor Szima
- Manager: (Hungary) Elemér Kondás
- NB 1: 4th
- Hungarian Cup: Round of 16
- Hungarian League Cup: Runners-up
- Super Cup: Runners-up
- UEFA Champions League: Third qualifying round
- UEFA Europa League: Play-off round
- Top goalscorer: League: (Hungary) Tibor Tisza (7); All: (Hungary) Tibor Tisza (11)
- Highest home attendance: 14,000 vs BATE Borisov (29 July 2014)
- Lowest home attendance: 70 vs Soproni VSE (9 December 2014)
Home colours	Away colours

The 2014–15 season was Debreceni VSC's 37th competitive season, 22nd consecutive season in the OTP Bank Liga and 112th year in existence as a football club.

== First team squad ==
Note: Flags indicate national team as defined under FIFA eligibility rules; some limited exceptions apply. Players may hold more than one non-FIFA nationality.

No.	Pos.	Nation	Player
6	MF	HUN	László Zsidai
8	MF	FRA	Selim Bouadla
10	MF	SVN	Rene Mihelič
11	MF	HUN	János Ferenczi
13	DF	HUN	Pál Lázár
14	MF	HUN	Dániel Vadnai
16	FW	HUN	Norbert Balogh
17	DF	HUN	Norbert Mészáros
18	DF	HUN	Péter Máté
21	DF	HUN	Bence Ludánszki
23	MF	HUN	Dániel Bereczki
24	DF	EST	Igor Morozov

No.	Pos.	Nation	Player
25	DF	SRB	Dušan Brković
26	FW	SEN	Ibrahima Sidibe
27	MF	HUN	Ádám Bódi
33	MF	HUN	József Varga
44	FW	HUN	Tibor Tisza
45	GK	SRB	Nenad Novaković
55	MF	HUN	Péter Szakály
69	DF	HUN	Mihály Korhut
70	FW	HUN	Tamás Kulcsár
77	MF	BIH	Aleksandar Jovanović
87	GK	HUN	István Verpecz
88	FW	FRA	L´Imam Seydi

== Transfers ==
=== Summer ===
In: Note: Flags indicate national team as defined under FIFA eligibility rules; some limited exceptions apply. Players may hold more than one non-FIFA nationality.

No.	Pos.	Nation	Player
1	GK	MNE	Vukašin Poleksić (loan return from Kecskemét)
1	GK	HUN	Balázs Slakta (from Debrecen U-19)
2	DF	HUN	István Szűcs (loan return from Létavértes)
33	MF	HUN	József Varga (loan return from (England) Middlesbrough)
37	MF	BRA	Lucas (loan return from Békéscsaba)
60	FW	HUN	Péter Pölöskei (loan return from Pécs)
66	FW	HUN	Márk Szécsi (loan return from Kecskemét)
77	MF	BIH	Aleksandar Jovanović (from Ferencváros)
91	FW	HUN	Ádám Balajti (loan return from Mezőkövesd)

Out: Note: Flags indicate national team as defined under FIFA eligibility rules; some limited exceptions apply. Players may hold more than one non-FIFA nationality.

No.	Pos.	Nation	Player
1	GK	MNE	Vukašin Poleksić (to Pécs)
4	MF	CIV	Joël Damahou
5	DF	HUN	András Burics (loan to Cegléd)
16	DF	HUN	Martin Króner (loan to Zalaegerszeg)
17	DF	HUN	Csaba Szatmári (loan to Balmazújváros)
22	DF	HUN	Csaba Bernáth (retired)
23	FW	HUN	Ádám Kovács (loan to Sopron)
28	DF	HUN	Zoltán Nagy (loan to Nyíregyháza)
29	MF	HUN	István Spitzmüller (to Nyítegyháza)
36	MF	HUN	Dávid Sigér (loan to Balmazújváros)
37	MF	BRA	Lucas (to (Slovakia) Bodva)
60	FW	HUN	Péter Pölöskei (to Pécs)
66	FW	HUN	Márk Szécsi (to Nyíregyháza)
91	FW	HUN	Ádám Balajti (to Mezőkövesd)

=== Winter ===
In: Note: Flags indicate national team as defined under FIFA eligibility rules; some limited exceptions apply. Players may hold more than one non-FIFA nationality.

No.	Pos.	Nation	Player
—	FW	HUN	Márk Szécsi (loan return from Nyíregyháza)
—	DF	HUN	Zoltán Nagy (loan return from Nyíregyháza)
—	FW	HUN	Norbert Balogh (from Debrecen II)
—	MF	HUN	Péter Berdó (from Debrecen U-19)
—	MF	HUN	Dániel Bereczki (from Debrecen II)
—	MF	HUN	Dávid Wittrédi (from Pécs)

Out: Note: Flags indicate national team as defined under FIFA eligibility rules; some limited exceptions apply. Players may hold more than one non-FIFA nationality.

No.	Pos.	Nation	Player
2	DF	HUN	István Szűcs (to Siófok)
19	FW	SVN	Dalibor Volaš (to (Slovenia) Maribor)
88	FW	FRA	L´Imam Seydi (to Nyíregyháza)

- List of Hungarian football transfers summer 2014
- List of Hungarian football transfers winter 2014–15

== Competitions ==
=== Super Cup ===
11 July 2014	Debrecen	0–0 (a.e.t.) (4–5 p)	Újpest	Budapest
20:30 CEST		Report		Stadium: Puskás Ferenc Stadion; Attendance: 2,000; Referee: (Hungary) Viktor Kassai
	Penalties
	Sidibe (penalty scored); Bódi (penalty missed); Jovanović (penalty scored); Tisza (penalty scored); Varga (penalty scored); Máté (penalty missed)		Vasiljević (penalty scored); Nagy (penalty scored); Litauszki (penalty scored); Simon (penalty scored); Balogh (penalty missed); Heris (penalty scored)

=== Nemzeti Bajnokság I ===
==== League table ====
Pos	Team	Pld	W	D	L	GF	GA	GD	Pts	Qualification or relegation
2	Ferencváros	30	19	7	4	49	19	+30	64	Qualification for Europa League first qualifying round
3	MTK	30	18	3	9	39	25	+14	57	Qualification for Europa League first qualifying round
4	Debrecen	30	15	9	6	44	19	+25	54	Qualification for Europa League first qualifying round
5	Paks	30	14	9	7	44	27	+17	51	
6	Újpest	30	14	9	7	40	28	+12	51	

Source: mlsz.hu (in Hungarian)
Rules for classification: 1st points; 2nd overall wins; 3rd goal difference; 4th head-to-head points; 5th head-to-head goal difference; 6th head-to-head away goals scored; 7th fair-play points; 8th drawing of lots

==== Results summary ====
Overall								Home						Away					
Pld	W	D	L	GF	GA	GD	Pts	W	D	L	GF	GA	GD	W	D	L	GF	GA	GD
30	15	9	6	44	19	+25	54	10	3	2	31	7	+24	5	6	4	13	12	+1

Last updated: 31 May 2015.
Source: NB1

==== Results by round ====
Round	1	2	3	4	5	6	7	8	9	10	11	12	13	14	15	16	17	18	19	20	21	22	23	24	25	26	27	28	29	30
Ground	A	A	H	A	H	A	H	H	A	H	A	H	A	H	A	H	H	A	H	A	H	A	A	H	A	H	A	H	A	H
Result	D	L	W	L	W	D	L	D	L	W	W	D	W	W	W	W	W	W	D	L	W	D	W	W	D	L	D	W	D	W
Position	8	12	8	8	8	7	9	9	10	7	7	7	7	7	5	4	4	4	4	4	4	4	4	4	4	4	4	4	4	4

Updated to match(es) played on 31 May 2015. Source: Matches
A = Away; H = Home; W = Win; D = Draw; L = Loss

==== Matches ====
25 July 2014 1	Nyíregyháza	1–1	Debrecen	Nyíregyháza
19:00 CEST	Pekár 73'	Report	Seydi 39'	Stadium: Városi Stadion; Attendance: 4,828; Referee: (Hungary) Viktor Kassai

1 August 2014 2	MTK	1–0	Debrecen	Budapest
20:30 CEST	Horváth 90'	Report		Stadium: Stadion Hidegkuti Nándor; Attendance: 737; Referee: (Hungary) Zoltán Iványi

9 August 2014 3	Debrecen	2–0	Puskás	Debrecen
20:30 CEST	Zsidai 34', 89'	Report		Stadium: Nagyerdei Stadion; Attendance: 5,114; Referee: (Hungary) Mihály Fábián

16 August 2014 4	Újpest	1–0	Debrecen	Budapest
20:30 CEST	Simon 90'	Report		Stadium: Szusza Ferenc Stadium; Attendance: 3,200; Referee: (Hungary) Zoltán Iványi

24 August 2014 5	Debrecen	1–0	Haladás	Debrecen
20:30 CEST	Kulcsár 50'	Report		Stadium: Nagyerdei Stadion; Attendance: 3,930; Referee: (Hungary) Mihály Fábián

31 August 2014 6	Diósgyőr	1–1	Debrecen	Miskolc
20:30 CEST	Griffiths 84'	Report	Seydi 31'	Stadium: DVTK Stadion; Attendance: 5,662; Referee: (Hungary) István Vad

13 September 2014 7	Debrecen	0–2	Pécs	Debrecen
14:30 CEST		Report	Mohl 55' (pen.); Pölöskei 90+2'	Stadium: Nagyerdei Stadion; Attendance: 2,546; Referee: (Hungary) József Erdős

21 September 2014 8	Debrecen	0–0	Kecskemét	Debrecen
18:30 CEST		Report		Stadium: Nagyerdei Stadion; Attendance: 2,283; Referee: (Hungary) Tamás Bognár

27 September 2014 9	Paks	2–1	Debrecen	Paks
18:30 CEST	Bartha 37'; Báló 90+2'	Report	Kulcsár 16'	Stadium: Stadion PSE; Attendance: 1,125; Referee: (Hungary) Ádám Farkas

4 October 2014 10	Debrecen	4–0	Honvéd	Debrecen
16:00 CEST	Tisza 15'; Sidibe 38'; Vadnai 47'; Varga 61'	Report		Stadium: Nagyerdei Stadion; Attendance: 2,662; Referee: (Hungary) Ádám Németh

19 October 2014 11	Videoton	1–2	Debrecen	Székesfehérvár
16:30 CEST	Kovács 34'	Report	Kulcsár 27', 59'	Stadium: Sóstói Stadion; Attendance: 5,282; Referee: (Hungary) József Erdős

26 October 2014 12	Debrecen	2–2	Ferencváros	Debrecen
16:30 CET	Varga 56'; Szakály 58'	Report	Ugrai 18'; Lauth 79'	Stadium: Nagyerdei Stadion; Attendance: 8,157; Referee: (Hungary) Zsolt Szabó

1 November 2014 13	Pápa	0–2	Debrecen	Pápa
18:00 CET		Report	Brković 57'; Lázár 84'	Stadium: Perutz Stadion; Attendance: 1,000; Referee: (Hungary) Sándor Andó-Szabó

8 November 2014 14	Debrecen	2–0	Dunaújváros	Debrecen
20:00 CET	Máté 60'; Brković 79'	Report		Stadium: Nagyerdei Stadion; Attendance: 2,657; Referee: (Hungary) Csaba Pintér

23 November 2014 15	Győr	0–1	Debrecen	Győr
18:30 CET		Report	Tisza 11'	Stadium: ETO Park; Attendance: 1,885; Referee: (Hungary) József Erdős

30 November 2014 16	Debrecen	5–0	Nyíregyháza	Debrecen
16:30 CET	Sidibe 12', 72'; Tisza 26', 33' (pen.); Szakály 90+2' (pen.)	Report		Stadium: Nagyerdei Stadion; Attendance: 2,612; Referee: (Hungary) István Vad

7 December 2014 17	Debrecen	2–1	MTK	Debrecen
18:30 CET	Varga 11'; Tisza 82' (pen.)	Report	Pölöskei 61'	Stadium: Nagyerdei Stadion; Attendance: 2,423; Referee: (Hungary) Ádám Németh

28 February 2015 18	Puskás	0–1	Debrecen	Felcsút
16:00 CET		Report	Tisza 56'	Stadium: Pancho Arena; Attendance: 1,000; Referee: (Hungary) Csaba Pinter

8 March 2015 19	Debrecen	0–0	Újpest	Debrecen
18:30 CET		Report		Stadium: Nagyerdei Stadion; Attendance: 5,014; Referee: (Hungary) Jozsef Erdos

14 March 2015 20	Haladás	2–0	Debrecen	Szombathely
18:00 CET	Martínez 33', 42'	Report		Stadium: Rohonci Street Stadium; Attendance: 1,738; Referee: (Hungary) Zoltan Ivanyi

22 March 2015 21	Debrecen	1–0	Diósgyőr	Debrecen
18:30 CET	Tisza 4'	Report		Stadium: Nagyerdei Stadion; Attendance: 3,338; Referee: (Hungary) Adam Farkas

4 April 2015 22	Pécs	0–0	Debrecen	Pécs
16:00 CEST		Report		Stadium: Stadion PMFC; Attendance: 1,047; Referee: (Hungary) Ádám Németh

10 April 2015 23	Kecskemét	1–2	Debrecen	Kecskemét
19:00 CEST	Kitl 16'	Report	Bódi 22'; Jovanović 62'	Stadium: Széktói Stadion; Attendance: 2,712; Referee: (Hungary) Jozsef Erdos

18 April 2015 24	Debrecen	2–0	Paks	Debrecen
18:30 CEST	Rodenbücher 28' (o.g.); Sidibe 82'	Report		Stadium: Nagyerdei Stadion; Attendance: 2,623; Referee: (Hungary) Csaba Pinter

26 April 2015 25	Honvéd	1–1	Debrecen	Budapest
18:30 CEST	Youla 27'	Report	Bouadla 39'	Stadium: Bozsik Stadion; Attendance: 1,042; Referee: (Hungary) István Vad

2 May 2015 26	Debrecen	1–2	Videoton	Debrecen
14:00 CEST	Bódi 82'	Report	Feczesin 54'; Gyurcsó 43'	Stadium: Nagyerdei Stadion; Attendance: 6,155; Referee: (Hungary) Zoltán Iványi

10 May 2015 27	Ferencváros	1–1	Debrecen	Budapest
16:30 CEST	Pavlović 19'	Report	Bódi 90'	Stadium: Groupama Arena; Attendance: 10,463; Referee: (Hungary) Sándor Andó-Szabó

17 May 2015 28	Debrecen	4–0	Pápa	Debrecen
18:30 CEST	Szakály 44'; Mihelič 58' (pen.); Balogh 59', 87'	Report		Stadium: Nagyerdei Stadion; Attendance: 4,254; Referee: (Hungary) Fabian Mihaly

22 May 2015 29	Dunaújváros	0–0	Debrecen	Dunaújváros
19:00 CEST		Report		Stadium: Dunaferr Arena; Attendance: 1,149; Referee: (Hungary) Zsolt Szabó

31 May 2015 30	Debrecen	5–0	Győr	Debrecen
18:30 CEST	Ferenci 9'; Bódi 15', 18', 65'; Sós 81'	Report		Stadium: Nagyerdei Stadion; Attendance: 3,268; Referee: (Hungary) Zoltán Iványi

=== Hungarian Cup ===
13 August 2014 Round 1	Szekszárd	0–3	Debrecen	Szekszárd
17:00 CEST		Report	Seydi 46', 56'; Brković 59'	Stadium: Szekszárdi UFC Sporttelep; Referee: (Hungary) Béla Botló

10 September 2014 Round 2	Mórahalom	0–6	Debrecen	Mórahalom
15:30 CEST		Report	Bereczki 6', 38'; Berdó 40'; Volaš 65'; Gonda 75' (o.g.); Tisza 83'	Stadium: Városi Sporttelep; Attendance: 800; Referee: (Hungary) Tamás Takács

24 September 2014 Round 3	Puskás	0–2	Debrecen	Felcsút
15:00 CEST		Report	Szakály 53'; Kulcsár 90+4'	Stadium: Pancho Arena; Attendance: 200; Referee: (Hungary) Csaba Pintér

29 September 2014 Quarter-final	Pécs	1–0	Debrecen	Pécs
16:00 CET	Romić 63'	Report		Stadium: Stadion PMFC; Attendance: 1,000; Referee: (Hungary) Tamás Bognár

=== League Cup ===
==== Group stage ====
2 September 2014 1	Debrecen	1–1	Szeged	Debrecen
16:30 CEST	Ludánszki 80' (pen.)	Report	Manga 33'	Stadium: Stadion Oláh Gábor Út; Attendance: 1,000; Referee: (Hungary) József Berger

16 September 2014 2	Debrecen	2–3	Békéscsaba	Debrecen
16:00 CEST	Mészáros 35'; Volaš 81'	Report	Kertész 18'; Vólent 21', 65'	Stadium: Stadion Oláh Gábor Út; Attendance: 800; Referee: (Hungary) Róbert Nagy

7 October 2014 3	Kecskemét	0–2	Debrecen	Kecskemét
17:00 CEST		Report	Kulcsár 3', 86'	Stadium: Széktói Stadion; Attendance: 200; Referee: (Hungary) László Lovas

15 October 2014 4	Debrecen	2–0	Kecskemét	Debrecen
15:00 CEST	Berdó 33'; Jovanović 37'	Report		Stadium: Stadion Oláh Gábor Út; Attendance: 800; Referee: (Hungary) Gergely Szőts

12 November 2014 5	Békéscsaba	0–6	Debrecen	Békéscsaba
13:30 CET		Report	Mihelič 27', 66' (pen.), 90' (pen.); Tisza 63', 88'; Sós 72'	Stadium: Stadion Kórház utcai Attendance: 300; Referee: (Hungary) Balázs Berke

18 November 2014 6	Szeged	0–4	Debrecen	Gyula
13:00 CET		Report	Bereczki 12'; Balogh 70'; Varga 82'; Sós 89'	Stadium: Grosics Akadémia Sporttelep; Attendance: 70; Referee: (Hungary) Tamás Takács

Pos	Team	Pld	W	D	L	GF	GA	GD	Pts	Qualification	DEB	BÉK	KEC	SZE
1	Debrecen	6	4	1	1	17	4	+13	13	Advance to knockout phase	—	2–3	2–0	1–1
2	Békéscsaba	6	3	0	3	10	14	−4	9	Advance to knockout phase	0–6	—	2–3	2–0
3	Kecskemét	6	2	1	3	6	9	−3	7		0–2	2–0	—	0–0
4	Szeged	6	1	2	3	5	11	−6	5		0–4	1–3	3–1	—

Source: Soccerway

==== Knockout phase ====
3 December 2014 Round of 16 (1st leg)	Sopron	1–1	Debrecen	Sopron
13:00 CET	Horváth 81'	Report	Ferenczi 24' (pen.)	Stadium: Stadion Városi; Attendance: 100; Referee: (Hungary) József Erdős

9 December 2014 Round of 16 (2nd leg)	Debrecen	3–1 (4–2 agg.)	Sopron	Debrecen
13:00 CET	Bódi 23'; Seydi 48'; Ferenczi 61'	Report	Bobál 79'	Stadium: Nagyerdei Stadion; Attendance: 100; Referee: (Hungary) Balázs Berke

18 March 2015 Quarter-final (1st leg)	Debrecen	2–3	Videoton	Debrecen
18:00 CET	Mihelič 37' (pen.); Sidibe 90'	Summary	Alvarez 9' (pen.); Ivanovski 31' (pen.); Feczesin 90+3' (pen.)	Stadium: Nagyerdei Stadion; Attendance: 1,000; Referee: (Hungary) Sándor Andó-Szabó

22 April 2015 Quarter-final (2nd leg)	Videoton	0–2 (3–4 agg.)	Debrecen	Székesfehérvár
17:30 CEST		Summary	Máté 5'; Kulcsár 73'	Stadium: Sóstói Stadion; Referee: (Hungary) Tamás Bognár

13 May 2015 Semi-final (1st leg)	Debrecen	3–1	MTK Budapest	Debrecen
18:00 CEST	Ludánszki 17'; Bereczky 74'	Summary	Torghelle 33'	Stadium: Nagyerdei Stadion; Referee: (Hungary) Jozsef Erdos

26 May 2015 Semi-final (2nd leg)	MTK Budapest	0–2 (1–5 agg.)	Debrecen	Budapest
18:00 CEST		Summary	Ludánszki 82'; Kulcsár 90+1'	Stadium: Hidegkuti Nándor Stadium; Attendance: 200; Referee: (Hungary) Balazs Berke

3 June 2015 Final	Debrecen	1–2	Ferencváros	Debrecen
19:00 CEST	Brković 73'	Summary	Ugrai 8'; Nagy 47'	Stadium: Nagyerdei Stadion; Attendance: 5,000; Referee: (Hungary) Fabian Mihaly

=== UEFA Champions League ===
The First and Second Qualifying Round draws took place at UEFA headquarters in Nyon, Switzerland on 23 June 2014.

15 July 2014 Q2 Leg 1	Cliftonville (Northern Ireland)	0–0	(Hungary) Debrecen	Belfast
19:45 CEST		Report		Stadium: Solitude; Attendance: 4,000; Referee: (Portugal) Artur Soares Dias

22 July 2014 Q2 Leg 2	Debrecen (Hungary)	2–0 (2–0 agg.)	(Northern Ireland) Cliftonville	Debrecen
20:30 CEST	Mihelič 55'; Sidibe 79'	Report		Stadium: Nagyerdei Stadion; Attendance: 11,000; Referee: (Serbia) Vlado Glođović

29 July 2014 Q3 Leg 1	Debrecen (Hungary)	1–0	(Belarus) BATE Borisov	Debrecen
20:30 CEST	Sidibe 56' (pen.)	Report		Stadium: Nagyerdei Stadion; Attendance: 14,000; Referee: (Poland) Szymon Marciniak

5 August 2014 Q3 Leg 2	BATE Borisov (Belarus)	3–1 (3–2 agg.)	(Hungary) Debrecen	Barysaw
20:30 CEST	Valadzko 39'; Rodionov 66'; Krivets 90+4'	Report	Sidibe 20' (pen.)	Stadium: Borisov Arena; Attendance: 12,788; Referee: (Sweden) Stefan Johannesson

=== UEFA Europa League ===
21 July 2014 Q4 Leg 1	Young Boys (Switzerland)	3–1	(Hungary) Debrecen	Bern
19:30 CEST	Nuzzolo 26'; Steffen 67'; Frey 87'	Report	Sidibe 39'	Stadium: Stade de Suisse; Attendance: 11,382; Referee: (Norway) Tom Harald Hagen

28 August 2014 Q4 Leg 2	Debrecen (Hungary)	0–0 (1–3 agg.)	(Switzerland) Young Boys	Debrecen
20:30 CEST		Report		Stadium: Nagyerdei Stadion; Attendance: 5,900; Referee: (Spain) David Fernández Borbalán

== Statistics ==
=== Appearances and goals ===
Last updated on 9 December 2014.

No.	Pos	Nat	Player	Total		OTP Bank Liga		Champions League		Hungarian Cup		League Cup	
No.	Pos	Nat	Player	Apps	Goals	Apps	Goals	Apps	Goals	Apps	Goals	Apps	Goals
6	MF	(Hungary) HUN	László Zsidai	27	2	12	2	6	0	3	0	6	0
8	MF	(France) FRA	Selim Bouadla	16	0	10	0	3	0	2	0	1	0
10	MF	(Slovenia) SVN	Rene Mihelič	11	4	5	0	3	1	1	0	2	3
11	MF	(Hungary) HUN	János Ferenczi	11	2	4	0	1	0	2	0	4	2
13	DF	(Hungary) HUN	Pál Lázár	21	1	12	1	1	0	3	0	5	0
14	MF	(Hungary) HUN	Dániel Vadnai	21	1	11	1	2	0	3	0	5	0
16	FW	(Hungary) HUN	Norbert Balogh	8	1	4	0	0	0	0	0	4	1
17	DF	(Hungary) HUN	Norbert Mészáros	13	1	3	0	6	0	1	0	3	1
18	DF	(Hungary) HUN	Péter Máté	21	1	13	1	6	0	0	0	2	0
21	DF	(Hungary) HUN	Bence Ludánszki	14	1	3	0	1	0	2	0	8	1
23	MF	(Hungary) HUN	Dániel Bereczki	7	3	1	0	0	0	2	2	4	1
24	DF	(Estonia) EST	Igor Morozov	13	0	8	0	1	0	2	0	2	0
25	DF	(Serbia) SRB	Dušan Brković	20	3	12	2	1	0	3	1	4	0
26	FW	(Senegal) SEN	Ibrahima Sidibe	19	7	11	3	6	4	1	0	1	0
27	MF	(Hungary) HUN	Ádám Bódi	26	1	15	0	6	0	1	0	4	1
33	MF	(Hungary) HUN	József Varga	22	3	15	3	6	0	1	0	0	0
44	FW	(Hungary) HUN	Tibor Tisza	24	8	14	5	2	0	4	1	4	2
45	GK	(Serbia) SRB	Nenad Novaković	19	-11	11	-7	5	-3	3	-1	0	0
55	MF	(Hungary) HUN	Péter Szakály	23	3	12	2	4	0	2	1	5	0
69	DF	(Hungary) HUN	Mihály Korhut	23	0	15	0	6	0	1	0	1	0
70	FW	(Hungary) HUN	Tamás Kulcsár	20	7	10	4	2	0	2	1	6	2
77	MF	(Bosnia and Herzegovina) BIH	Aleksandar Jovanović	25	1	14	0	6	0	2	0	3	1
87	GK	(Hungary) HUN	István Verpecz	10	-7	2	-1	0	0	0	0	8	-6
88	FW	(France) FRA	L´Imam Seydi	19	5	8	2	5	0	3	2	3	1
Youth players:
4	MF	(Hungary) HUN	Gergő Kovács	3	0	0	0	0	0	1	0	2	0
7	MF	(Hungary) HUN	Tibor Dombi	7	0	0	0	0	0	1	0	6	0
11	FW	(Hungary) HUN	Tamás Sándor	2	0	0	0	0	0	0	0	2	0
15	DF	(Hungary) HUN	Szabolcs Barna	2	0	0	0	0	0	1	0	1	0
15	MF	(Hungary) HUN	Gergő Tóth	1	0	0	0	0	0	0	0	1	0
22	MF	(Hungary) HUN	Kevin Varga	4	1	0	0	0	0	1	0	3	1
23	DF	(Hungary) HUN	Krisztián Karikás	3	0	0	0	0	0	1	0	2	0
24	DF	(Hungary) HUN	Dániel Böszörményi	1	0	0	0	0	0	0	0	1	0
25	MF	(Hungary) HUN	Péter Berdó	7	2	0	0	0	0	1	1	6	1
28	MF	(Hungary) HUN	Bendegúz Györky	2	0	0	0	0	0	0	0	2	0
29	MF	(Hungary) HUN	Bence Sós	9	2	0	0	0	0	2	0	7	2
51	DF	(Hungary) HUN	Ákos Kinyik	3	0	0	0	0	0	0	0	3	0
Out to loan:
28	DF	(Hungary) HUN	Zoltán Nagy	2	0	1	0	0	0	1	0	0	0
Players no longer at the club:
1	GK	(Montenegro) MNE	Vukašin Poleksić	6	-6	4	-3	1	-3	1	0	0	0
4	MF	(Ivory Coast) CIV	Joël Damahou	2	0	1	0	0	0	1	0	0	0
19	FW	(Slovenia) SVN	Dalibor Volaš	13	2	5	0	2	0	1	1	5	1

=== Top scorers ===
Includes all competitive matches. The list is sorted by shirt number when total goals are equal.

Last updated on 9 December 2014

Position	Nation	Number	Name	OTP Bank Liga	Hungarian Cup	Champions League	League Cup	Total
1	(Hungary)	44	Tibor Tisza	5	0	1	2	8
2	(Senegal)	26	Ibrahima Sidibe	3	4	0	0	7
3	(Hungary)	70	Tamás Kulcsár	4	0	1	2	7
4	(France)	88	L´Imam Seydi	2	0	2	1	5
5	(Slovenia)	10	Rene Mihelič	0	1	0	3	4
6	(Hungary)	33	József Varga	3	0	0	0	3
7	(Serbia)	25	Dušan Brković	2	0	1	0	3
8	(Hungary)	55	Péter Szakály	2	0	1	0	3
9	(Hungary)	23	Dániel Bereczki	0	0	2	1	3
10	(Senegal)	6	László Zsidai	2	0	0	0	2
11	(Slovenia)	19	Dalibor Volaš	0	0	1	1	2
12	(Hungary)	25	Péter Berdó	0	0	1	1	2
13	(Hungary)	53	Bence Sós	0	0	0	2	2
14	(Hungary)	11	János Ferenczi	0	0	0	2	2
15	(Hungary)	14	Dániel Vadnai	1	0	0	0	1
16	(Hungary)	13	Pál Lázár	1	0	0	0	1
17	(Hungary)	18	Péter Máté	1	0	0	0	1
18	(Hungary)	21	Bence Ludánszki	0	0	0	1	1
19	(Hungary)	17	Norbert Mészáros	0	0	0	1	1
20	(Bosnia and Herzegovina)	77	Aleksandar Jovanović	0	0	0	1	1
21	(Hungary)	16	Norbert Balogh	0	0	0	1	1
22	(Hungary)	13	Kevin Varga	0	0	0	1	1
23	(Hungary)	27	Ádám Bódi	0	0	0	1	1
/	/	/	Own Goals	0	0	1	0	1
			TOTALS	26	5	11	21	58

=== Disciplinary record ===
Includes all competitive matches. Players with 1 card or more included only.

Last updated on 9 December 2014

Position	Nation	Number	Name	OTP Bank Liga		Champions League		Hungarian Cup		League Cup		Total (Hu Total)	
Position	Nation	Number	Name	Booked	Sent off (straight red)	Booked	Sent off (straight red)	Booked	Sent off (straight red)	Booked	Sent off (straight red)	Booked	Sent off (straight red)
MF	(Hungary)	6	László Zsidai	1	2	2	0	0	0	1	0	4 (1)	2 (2)
MF	(France)	8	Selim Bouadla	1	0	0	1	0	0	0	0	1 (1)	1 (0)
MF	(Hungary)	11	János Ferenczi	0	0	1	0	0	0	0	1	1 (0)	1 (0)
DF	(Hungary)	13	Pál Lázár	3	0	0	0	1	0	1	0	5 (3)	0 (0)
MF	(Hungary)	14	Dániel Vadnai	2	0	1	0	0	0	0	0	3 (2)	0 (0)
DF	(Hungary)	17	Norbert Mészáros	0	0	1	0	0	0	1	0	2 (0)	0 (0)
DF	(Hungary)	18	Péter Máté	4	0	1	0	0	0	1	0	6 (4)	0 (0)
FW	(Slovenia)	19	Dalibor Volaš	1	0	0	0	0	0	0	0	1 (1)	0 (0)
DF	(Hungary)	21	Bence Ludánszki	1	0	0	0	0	0	1	0	2 (1)	0 (0)
DF	(Estonia)	24	Igor Morozov	3	0	1	0	0	0	0	0	4 (3)	0 (0)
DF	(Serbia)	25	Dušan Brković	1	0	0	0	0	0	0	0	1 (1)	0 (0)
MF	(Hungary)	25	Péter Berdó	0	0	0	0	1	0	0	0	1 (0)	0 (0)
FW	(Senegal)	26	Ibrahima Sidibe	0	0	2	0	0	0	0	0	2 (0)	0 (0)
MF	(Hungary)	27	Ádám Bódi	1	0	1	0	0	0	1	0	3 (1)	0 (0)
MF	(Hungary)	33	József Varga	4	0	1	0	0	0	0	0	5 (4)	0 (0)
FW	(Hungary)	44	Tibor Tisza	2	0	0	0	0	0	0	0	2 (2)	0 (0)
GK	(Serbia)	45	Nenad Novaković	1	0	0	0	0	0	0	0	1 (1)	0 (0)
DF	(Hungary)	51	Ákos Kinyik	0	0	0	0	0	0	1	0	1 (0)	0 (0)
MF	(Hungary)	55	Péter Szakály	0	0	0	0	1	0	1	0	2 (0)	0 (0)
DF	(Hungary)	69	Mihály Korhut	3	0	3	0	0	0	0	0	6 (3)	0 (0)
FW	(Hungary)	70	Tamás Kulcsár	0	2	0	0	0	0	0	0	0 (0)	2 (2)
MF	(Bosnia and Herzegovina)	77	Aleksandar Jovanović	2	1	0	0	1	0	0	0	3 (2)	1 (1)
FW	(France)	88	L´Imam Seydi	0	0	0	1	0	0	0	0	0 (0)	1 (0)
			TOTALS	30	5	14	2	4	0	8	1	56 (30)	8 (5)

=== Overall ===
Games played	35 (17 OTP Bank Liga, 6 Champions League, 4 Hungarian Cup and 8 Hungarian League Cup)
Games won	18 (9 OTP Bank Liga, 2 Champions League, 3 Hungarian Cup and 4 Hungarian League Cup)
Games drawn	8 (4 OTP Bank Liga, 2 Champions League, 0 Hungarian Cup and 2 Hungarian League Cup)
Games lost	8 (4 OTP Bank Liga, 2 Champions League, 1 Hungarian Cup and 1 Hungarian League Cup)
Goals scored	63
Goals conceded	25
Goal difference	+38
Yellow cards	56
Red cards	8
Worst discipline	(Hungary) László Zsidai (4 (yellow card) , 2 (red card) )
Best result	6–0 (A) v Mórahalom - Magyar Kupa - 10–09–2014
Best result	6–0 (A) v Békéscsaba - Ligakupa - 12–11–2014
Worst result	1–3 (A) v BATE Borisov - UEFA Champions League - 05–08–2014
Worst result	1–3 (A) v Young Boys - UEFA Europa League - 21–08–2014
Worst result	0–2 (H) v Pécs - OTP Bank Liga - 13–09–2014
Most appearances	(Hungary) László Zsidai (27 appearances)
Top scorer	(Hungary) Tibor Tisza (8 goals)
Points	65/105 (61.91%)

Last updated: 9 December 2014
