= János Ferenczi =

Hungarian footballer

Personal information
- Date of birth: 3 April 1991 (age 35)
- Place of birth: Debrecen, Hungary
- Height: 1.80 m (5 ft 11 in)
- Positions: Left-back; winger

Team information
- Current team: FK Csíkszereda
- Number: 19

Youth career
- 2000–2009: Debrecen

Senior career*
Years	Team	Apps	(Gls)
2009–2025	Debrecen	283	(12)
2009–2020	Debrecen II	78	(23)
2009–2010	→ Létavértes (loan)	26	(18)
2025–	FK Csíkszereda	17	(0)

International career^{‡}
2019–2023	Hungary	2	(0)
- * Club domestic league appearances and goals as of 22 December 2025 ‡ National team caps and goals as of 20 June 2023

János Ferenczi (born 3 April 1991) is a Hungarian professional footballer who plays as a left-back or a winger for Liga I club FK Csíkszereda.

== Club career ==
Ferenczi played for his hometown team Debrecen in the early stages of his career as a midfielder. He was loaned out to lower-division teams twice before becoming a regular for DVSC.

After 17 years, he signed for Romanian top-flight side FK Csíkszereda in 2025.

== International ==
He made his debut for Hungary national football team on 5 September 2019 in a friendly against Montenegro, as a 61st-minute substitute for Mihály Korhut.

== Career statistics ==
=== Club ===
As of match played 22 December 2025

Appearances and goals by club, season and competition
Club	Season	League			National cup (Note: Includes Magyar Kupa)		League cup (Note: Includes Ligakupa)		Europe		Other		Total	
Club	Season	Division	Apps	Goals	Apps	Goals	Apps	Goals	Apps	Goals	Apps	Goals	Apps	Goals
Debrecen	2008–09	Nemzeti Bajnokság I	—		—		1	0	—		—		1	0
Debrecen	2010–11	Nemzeti Bajnokság I	0	0	2	1	1	0	0	0	0	0	3	1
Debrecen	2011–12	Nemzeti Bajnokság I	2	0	1	0	4	3	—		—		7	3
Debrecen	2012–13	Nemzeti Bajnokság I	14	0	6	2	3	1	0	0	0	0	23	3
Debrecen	2013–14	Nemzeti Bajnokság I	6	1	6	1	12	1	1 (Note: Appearance(s) in UEFA Europa League)	0	1 (Note: Appearance in Szuperkupa)	0	26	3
Debrecen	2014–15	Nemzeti Bajnokság I	7	1	2	0	7	2	1	0	0	0	17	3
Debrecen	2015–16	Nemzeti Bajnokság I	14	0	5	1	—		0	0	—		19	1
Debrecen	2016–17	Nemzeti Bajnokság I	24	3	1	0	—		4	0	—		29	3
Debrecen	2017–18	Nemzeti Bajnokság I	23	1	2	0	—		—		—		25	1
Debrecen	2018–19	Nemzeti Bajnokság I	25	2	2	0	—		—		—		27	2
Debrecen	2019–20	Nemzeti Bajnokság I	32	0	1	0	—		4	0	—		37	0
Debrecen	2020–21	Nemzeti Bajnokság II	29	1	5	0	—		—		—		34	1
Debrecen	2021–22	Nemzeti Bajnokság I	30	2	2	0	—		—		—		32	2
Debrecen	2022–23	Nemzeti Bajnokság I	29	0	3	2	—		—		—		32	2
Debrecen	2023–24	Nemzeti Bajnokság I	27	0	3	0	—		1 (Note: Appearance in UEFA Europa Conference League)	0	—		31	0
Debrecen	2024–25	Nemzeti Bajnokság I	21	1	2	0	–		—		—		23	1
Debrecen	Total		283	12	43	7	28	7	11	0	1	0	366	26
Debrecen II	2008–09	Nemzeti Bajnokság II	1	0	—		—		—		—		1	0
Debrecen II	2010–11	Nemzeti Bajnokság II	23	1	—		—		—		—		23	1
Debrecen II	2011–12	Nemzeti Bajnokság II	9	3	—		—		—		—		9	3
Debrecen II	2012–13	Nemzeti Bajnokság II	14	6	—		—		—		—		14	6
Debrecen II	2013–14	Nemzeti Bajnokság III	8	3	—		—		—		—		8	3
Debrecen II	2014–15	Nemzeti Bajnokság III	10	7	—		—		—		—		10	7
Debrecen II	2015–16	Nemzeti Bajnokság III	7	0	—		—		—		—		7	0
Debrecen II	2016–17	Nemzeti Bajnokság III	5	3	—		—		—		—		5	3
Debrecen II	2020–21	Nemzeti Bajnokság III	1	0	—		—		—		—		1	0
Debrecen II	Total		78	23	—		—		—		—		78	23
Létavértes (loan)	2009–10	Nemzeti Bajnokság III	26	18	2	1	—		—		—		28	19
FK Csíkszereda	2025–26	Liga I	17	0	3	1	—		—		—		20	1
Career total			404	53	48	9	28	7	11	0	1	0	492	69

=== International ===
As of match played on 20 June 2023

Appearances and goals by national team and year
National team	Year	Apps	Goals
Hungary	2019	1	0
Hungary	2023	1	0
Total		2	0

== Honours ==
Debrecen

- Nemzeti Bajnokság I: 2011–12, 2013–14
- Nemzeti Bajnokság II: 2020–21
- Magyar Kupa: 2011–12, 2012–13
- Ligakupa runner-up: 2010–11, 2014–15
- Szuperkupa: 2010
