= 2012–13 Magyar Kupa =

Hungarian football tournament season

Tournament details
- Country: Hungary
- Teams: 104

Final positions
- Champions: Debrecen (6th title)
- Runners-up: Győr
- UEFA Europa League: Debrecen

Tournament statistics
- Goals scored: 195
- Top goal scorer: (France) Adamo Coulibaly (8 goals)

The 2012–13 Magyar Kupa (English: Hungarian Cup) was the 73rd season of Hungary's annual knock-out cup football competition. It started with the first match of Round 1 on 12 August 2012 and ended with the final held in May 2013 at Bozsik József Stadion, Budapest. Debrecen were the defending champions, having won their fifth cup competition last season. The winner of the competition will qualify for the second qualifying round of the 2013–14 UEFA Europa League.

== Round of 128 ==
Matches were played on 12 August 2012 and involved the teams qualified through the local cup competitions during the previous season, Nemzeti Bajnokság III, Nemzeti Bajnokság II and the Nemzeti Bajnokság I teams.

Team 1	Score	Team 2
Nyíregyháza Spartacus (NB2)	1–0	Egri FC (NB1)
Dunakanyar-Vác FC (NB2)	2–2 (3–0 p)	MTK Budapest FC (NB1)
Csornai SE (NB3)	3–1	Répcelaki SE (NB3)
Nagykörösi Kinizsi (NB3)	0–3	Békéscsabai EFC (NB2)
Orosháza FC (NB2)	1–0	Ceglédi VSE (NB2)
Zalaszentgróti VFC (Megye 1)	1–2	Dunaújváros PASE (NB3)
FC Tatabánya (NB2)	1–2	Gyirmót SE (NB2)
Bölcskei SE (NB3)	3–1	Balatonlelle SE (NB3)
Létavértes SC (NB3)	2–0	Putnok VSE (NB2)
Felsőtárkány SC (NB3)	1–0	Várda SE (NB3)
Vésztői SE (Megye 2)	1–6	Bajai LSE (NB2)
Nagybátonyi SC (NB3)	3–2	FC Hatvan (NB3)
Pénzügyőr SE (NB3)	2–1	Diósdi TC (NB3)
Kozármisleny SE (NB2)	0–0 (5–6 p)	Veszprém FC (NB2)
Sajóbábonyi VSE (Megye 2)	1–6	Balmazújvárosi FC (NB2)
Terem SE (Megye 2)	1–2	Kazincbarcikai SC (NB2)
Velence SE (Megye 2)	6–6 (5–4 p)	Maglódi TC (NB3)
Gyód SK (Megye 2)	0–4	Balatonfüredi FC (NB3)
Jászfényszaru VSE (Megye 1)	0–4	Budaörsi SC (NB3)
Gönyű SE (Megye 2)	0–4	Kecskéd KSK (Megye 1)
Szedres SE (Megye 1)	0–8	Nagyatádi FC (NB3)
Babóti SE (Megye 2)	1–0	Rábapatyi KSK (Megye 1)
Szolnoki MÁV FC (NB2)	3–1	Szeged 2011 (NB2)
Martonvásár SK (Megye 1)	2–1	Sárisáp BSE (NB3)
Szigetszentmiklósi TK (NB2)	2–1	BKV Előre SC (NB2)
ESMTK (NB3)	2–1	Viadukt SE Biatorbágy(NB3)
Gödi SE (Megye 1)	0–8	Jászapáti VSE (NB3)
Nemesapáti SE (Megye 2)	0–4	Szentlőrinc SE (NB3)
Pécsi VSK (Megye 1)	0–0 (7–6 p)	Nagykanizsai TE (NB3)
Hosszúpályi SE (Megye 1)	2–2 (4–5 p)	Bükkábrányi SC (NB3)
Nagyesztergár SE (Megye 2)	0–1	Petőházi SE (Megye 1)
Borsfa KSE (Megye 2)	1–14	Iváncsa (Megye 1)
Győrszemere KSK (Megye 1)	0–2	FC Ajka (NB2)
Nagykállói VSE (Megye 1)	0–2	FC Tiszaújváros (NB3)
Bánk SE (Megye 1)	2–4	Rákospalotai EAC (NB3)
Grund FC (Megye 1)	1–5	Vecsési FC (NB3)
Soltvadkerti TE (Megye 1)	0–0 (3–2 p)	Nagyszénási SE (Megye 1)
Nyírkarászi KSE (Megye 1)	0–8	Mezőkövesd-Zsóry SE (NB2)
Csanádpalota FC (Megye 1)	0–0 (4–1 p)	Kalocsa (Megye 1)
KSK Jánosháza (Megye 1)	3–2	Lipót SE (Megye 1)
Magyarpolány SE (Megye 1)	1–2	Tapolcai VSE (Megye 1)
Kunszállás SE (Megye 1)	1–4	Mórahalom VSE (NB3)
Uraiújfalu SE (Megye 1)	0–9	Soproni VSE (NB2)
Tomor-Lak (Megye 1)	0–2	Tiszakanyár SE (NB3)

== Round of 64 ==
Matches were played on 26 September 2012 and involved the teams qualified through the local cup competitions during the previous season, Nemzeti Bajnokság III, Nemzeti Bajnokság II and the Nemzeti Bajnokság I teams.

Team 1	Score	Team 2
Budaörsi SC (NB3)	0–1	BFC Siófok (NB1)
Tapolcai VSE (Megye 1)	0–9	Lombard-Pápa TFC (NB1)
Babóti SE (Megye 2)	0–12	Győri ETO FC (NB1)
Jászapáti VSE (NB3)	0–1	Dunakanyar-Vác FC (NB2)
ESMTK (NB3)	0–2	Békéscsabai EFC (NB2)
Bükkábrányi SC (NB3)	2–1	Nagybátonyi SC (NB3)
Létavértes SC (NB3)	2–0	Mezőkövesd-Zsóry SE (NB2)
Kazincbarcikai SC (NB2)	2–1	Újpest FC (NB1)
Pénzügyőr SE (NB3)	1–2	Vasas SC (NB2)
Soltvadkerti TE (Megye 1)	0–6	Mórahalom VSE (NB3)
Orosháza FC (NB2)	0–7	Diósgyőri VTK (NB1)
Csanádpalota FC (Megye 1)	1–2	Rákospalotai EAC (NB3)
Vecsési FC (NB3)	0–3	Szolnoki MÁV FC (NB2)
Nyíregyháza Spartacus (NB2)	4–2	Kecskeméti TE (NB1)
FC Tiszaújváros (NB3)	3–2	Balmazújvárosi FC (NB2)
Iváncsa (Megye 1)	0–2	Dunaújváros PASE (NB3)
Csornai SE (NB3)	1–5	Pécsi Mecsek FC (NB1)
Petőházi SE (Megye 1)	1–12	Zalaegerszegi TE (NB2)
Velence SE (Megye 2)	2–1	Nagyatádi FC (NB3)
Gyirmót SE (NB2)	1–2	Kaposvári Rákóczi FC (NB1)
KSK Jánosháza (Megye 1)	1–2	Szentlőrinc SE (NB3)
Balatonfüredi FC (NB3)	0–6	Soproni VSE (NB2)
Martonvásár SK (Megye 1)	0–4	Bölcskei SE (NB3)
Veszprém FC (NB2)	0–2	Paksi SE (NB1)
FC Ajka (NB2)	4–0	Bajai LSE (NB2)
Kecskéd KSK (Megye 1)	0–0 (4–5 p)	Pécsi VSK (Megye 1)
Felsőtárkány SC (NB3)	1–1 (5–4 p)	Szigetszentmiklósi TK (NB2)
Ferencvárosi TC (NB1)	0–2	Szombathelyi Haladás (NB1)

== Round of 32 ==
Matches were played on 30 and 31 October 2012. Entering this stage of the competition were the 28 winners from the previous round and the four clubs which competed in Europe this season.

Team 1	Score	Team 2
Velence SE (Megye 2)	0–3	Diósgyőri VTK (NB1)
Kazincbarcikai SC (NB2)	1–2	Nyíregyháza Spartacus (NB2)
Mórahalom VSE (NB3)	2 – 3 (a.e.t.)	Szolnoki MÁV FC (NB2)
Felsőtárkány SC (NB3)	0–1	BFC Siófok (NB1)
Bükkábrányi SC (NB3)	0–4	Zalaegerszegi TE (NB2)
Vasas SC (NB2)	3–0	FC Ajka (NB2)
FC Tiszaújváros (NB3)	2–1	Pécsi Mecsek FC (NB1)
Soproni VSE (NB2)	1 – 2 (a.e.t.)	Békéscsabai EFC (NB2)
Dunaújváros PASE (NB3)	1–0	Kaposvári Rákóczi FC (NB1)
Létavértes SC (NB3)	1–0	Lombard-Pápa TFC (NB1)
Bölcskei SE (NB3)	2–5	Győri ETO FC (NB1)
Pécsi VSK (Megye 1)	1–4	Budapest Honvéd FC (NB1)
Szentlőrinc SE (NB3)	1–3	Debreceni VSC (NB1)
Videoton FC (NB1)	2 – 0 (a.e.t.)	Szombathelyi Haladás (NB1)
Tiszakanyár SE (NB3)	1–2	Dunakanyar-Vác FC (NB2)
Rákospalotai EAC (NB3)	1–2	Paksi SE (NB1)

== Round of 16 ==
The sixteen winners of the previous round were drawn into eight two-legged matches. The winners on aggregate advanced to the next round. The first leg will be played on 21 November, the second leg is on 28 November 2012.

Team 1	Agg.	Team 2	1st leg	2nd leg
Videoton	10–3	Zalaegerszeg	4–0	6–3
Budapest Honvéd	6–1	Diósgyőr	4–0	2–1
Győr	7–2	Paks	4–0	3–2
Nyíregyháza	4–5	Debrecen	3–2	1–3
Békéscsaba	1 – 1 (3 – 4 p)	Vasas	0–1	1–0 (a.e.t.)
FC Tiszaújváros	1–6	Vác	1–1	0–5
Létavértes	2 – 2 (a)	Szolnok	0–1	2–1
Dunaújváros	2 – 2 (a)	Siófok	2–1	0–1

== Quarter-finals ==
The eight winners of the previous round were drawn into four two-legged matches. The winners on aggregate advanced to the next round. The first leg will be played on 23 February, the second leg is on 27 February 2013.

Team 1	Agg.	Team 2	1st leg	2nd leg
Vasas	4–3	Siófok	3–1	1–2
Honvéd	0–3	Győr	0–1	0–2
Létavértes	0–10	Debrecen	0–2	0–8
Vác	0–6	Videoton	0–3	0–3

== Semi-finals ==
The four winners of the previous round were drawn into two two-legged matches. The winners on aggregate advanced to the final. The first legs were played on 16 and 17 April, the second legs will be played on 7 and 8 May 2013.

Team 1	Agg.	Team 2	1st leg	2nd leg
Vasas	1–6	Debrecen	0–3	1–3
Videoton	2–3	Győr	0–2	2–1

=== First legs ===
16 April 2013
18:00

Vasas	0–3	Debrecen
	Report	Ferenczi 9' (pen.), 19' (pen.); Czvitkovics 68'

Stadion Rudolf Illovszky, Budapest
Attendance: 1,200
Referee: Adam Németh

17 April 2013
18:00

Videoton	0–2	Győr
	Report	Střeštík 31'; Tokody 67'

Sóstói Stadion, Székesfehérvár
Attendance: 2,000
Referee: Sandor Ando-Szabo

=== Second Legs ===
7 May 2013
18:00

Debrecen	3–1	Vasas
Coulibaly 54', 77'; Sidibe 89'	Report	Berecz 28'

Stadion Oláh Gábor Út, Debrecen
Attendance: 800
Referee: Csaba Pintér

8 May 2013
18:00

Győr	1–2	Videoton
Kink 90+2'	Report	Kovács 58'; Brachi 73' (pen.)

ETO Park, Győr
Attendance: 3,000
Referee: Szabolcs Szilasi

== Final ==
22 May 2013
20:00 CEST

Debrecen	2–1	Győr
Coulibaly 51', 87'	Report	Andrić 17'

Bozsik József Stadion, Budapest
Attendance: 4,500
Referee: Viktor Kassai

== Top goalscorers ==
Including matches played on 23 May 2013; Source: MLSZ

Rank	Scorer	Club	Goals
1	(France) Adamo Coulibaly	Debrecen	8
2	(Hungary) Ádám Dudás	Győr	7
3	(Serbia) Nemanja Andrić	Győr	6
4	(Hungary) Nemanja Nikolić	Videoton	5
4	(Hungary) István Pál	Velence	5
6	(Hungary) Richárd Vernes	Honvéd	4
6	(Hungary) Tibor Tisza	DVTK	4
6	(Hungary) Norbert Lauer	Szentlőrinc	4
6	(Hungary) Péter Tóth	ZTE	4
6	(Hungary) Ádám Hamar	Mezőkövesd	4
6	(Hungary) Zsolt Németh	Iváncsa	4
6	(Hungary) Péter Urbin	Balmazújváros	4
6	(Hungary) dr. Péter Szőke	Mórahalom	4
6	(Hungary) Márk Petneházi	Nyíregyháza	4
6	(Hungary) Szabolcs Gyánó	Sopron	4
6	(Montenegro) Darko Pavićević	ZTE	4

== See also ==
- 2012–13 Nemzeti Bajnokság I
- 2012–13 Nemzeti Bajnokság II
- 2012–13 Nemzeti Bajnokság III
- 2012–13 Ligakupa
