= István Szűcs =

Hungarian footballer

Personal information
- Date of birth: 3 May 1985 (age 41)
- Place of birth: Debrecen, Hungary
- Height: 1.90 m (6 ft 3 in)
- Position: Defender

Team information
- Current team: Békéscsaba (loan from Debrecen)
- Number: 23

Youth career
- 2003–2007: Debrecen
- 2005: → Létavértes (loan)

Senior career*
Years	Team	Apps	(Gls)
2007–	Debrecen	33	(3)
2010	→ Kecskemét (loan)	2	(0)
2013–	→ Békéscsaba (loan)	9	(0)
- * Club domestic league appearances and goals as of 1 December 2013

István Szűcs (Hungarian pronunciation: [ˈiʃtvaːn ˈsyːt͡ʃ]; born 3 May 1985) is a Hungarian footballer who currently plays for Debreceni VSC in the Hungarian Borsodi Liga.

== Club career ==
=== Debrecen ===
On 1 May 2012 Szűcs won the Hungarian Cup with Debrecen by beating MTK Budapest on penalty shoot-out in the 2011–12 season. This was the fifth Hungarian Cup trophy for Debrecen.

On 12 May 2012 Szűcs won the Hungarian League title with Debrecen after beating Pécs in the 28th round of the Hungarian League by 4–0 at the Oláh Gábor út Stadium which resulted the sixth Hungarian League title for the Hajdús.

== Club statistics ==
Club	Season	League			Cup		League Cup		Europe		Total	
Club	Season	Division	Apps	Goals	Apps	Goals	Apps	Goals	Apps	Goals	Apps	Goals
Debrecen	2006–07	Nemzeti Bajnokság I	2	0	0	0	0	0	0	0	2	0
Debrecen	2007–08	Nemzeti Bajnokság I	7	0	3	0	15	0	0	0	25	0
Debrecen	2008–09	Nemzeti Bajnokság I	5	2	1	0	1	0	3	0	10	2
Debrecen	2009–10	Nemzeti Bajnokság I	3	0	1	0	0	0	2	0	6	0
Debrecen	2010–11	Nemzeti Bajnokság I	5	0	2	0	4	0	4	0	15	0
Debrecen	2011–12	Nemzeti Bajnokság I	0	0	0	0	2	0	0	0	2	0
Debrecen	2012–13	Nemzeti Bajnokság I	11	1	6	0	3	1	0	0	20	2
Debrecen	Total		33	3	13	0	24	1	9	0	80	4
Kecskemét	2009–10	Nemzeti Bajnokság I	2	0	0	0	0	0	0	0	2	0
Békéscsaba	2013–14	Nemzeti Bajnokság II	9	0	3	0	1	0	0	0	13	0
Career total			44	3	16	0	26	1	9	0	95	4

Updated to games played as of 1 December 2013.
