= István Verpecz =

Hungarian footballer (born 1987)

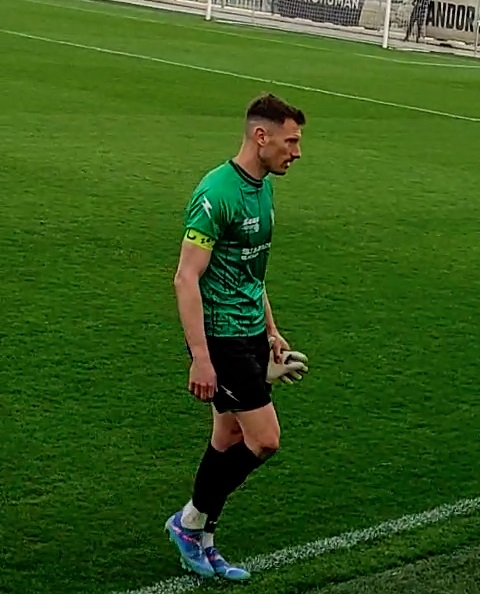
- Verpecz with Nagykanizsa in 2025

Personal information
- Date of birth: 4 February 1987 (age 39)
- Place of birth: Szikszó, Hungary
- Height: 1.93 m (6 ft 4 in)
- Position: Goalkeeper

Team information
- Current team: Zuberbach
- Number: 87

Youth career
- 2006–2007: Diósgyőr

Senior career*
Years	Team	Apps	(Gls)
2007–2017	Debrecen	81	(0)
2008–2017	→ Debrecen II	118	(0)
2017–2019	Paks	20	(0)
2018–2019	→ Balmazújváros (loan)	11	(0)
2020–2024	Haladás	86	(0)
2024–2025	Nagykanizsa	14	(0)
2025–	Zuberbach	8	(0)
- * Club domestic league appearances and goals as of 27 September 2025

István Verpecz (Hungarian pronunciation: [ˈiʃtvaːn ˈvɛrpɛt͡s]; born 4 February 1987) is a Hungarian professional footballer, who plays as a goalkeeper for SV Zuberbach.

== Club career ==
=== Debrecen ===
Verpecz won the 2009–10 season of the Hungarian League with Debrecen despite his team lost to Kecskeméti TE in the last round. In 2010 Debrecen beat Zalaegerszegi TE in the Hungarian Cup final in the Puskás Ferenc Stadium by 3–2.

On 1 May 2012 Verpecz won the Hungarian Cup with Debrecen by beating MTK Budapest on penalty shoot-out in the 2011–12 season. This was the fifth Hungarian Cup trophy for Debrecen.

On 12 May 2012 Verpecz won the Hungarian League title with Debrecen after beating Pécs in the 28th round of the Hungarian League by 4–0 at the Oláh Gábor út Stadium which resulted the sixth Hungarian League title for the Hajdús.

== Career statistics ==
Appearances and goals by club, season and competition
Club	Season	League			Cup		League Cup		Europe		Total	
Club	Season	Division	Apps	Goals	Apps	Goals	Apps	Goals	Apps	Goals	Apps	Goals
Debrecen
Debrecen	2007–08	Nemzeti Bajnokság I	0	0	0	0	1	0	0	0	1	0
Debrecen	2008–09	Nemzeti Bajnokság I	0	0	3	0	3	0	0	0	6	0
Debrecen	2009–10	Nemzeti Bajnokság I	3	0	7	0	2	0	0	0	12	0
Debrecen	2010–11	Nemzeti Bajnokság I	9	0	3	0	3	0	3	0	18	0
Debrecen	2011–12	Nemzeti Bajnokság I	5	0	4	0	8	0	0	0	17	0
Debrecen	2012–13	Nemzeti Bajnokság I	27	0	5	0	5	0	3	0	40	0
Debrecen	2013–14	Nemzeti Bajnokság I	10	0	5	0	8	0	2	0	25	0
Debrecen	2014–15	Nemzeti Bajnokság I	10	0	0	0	13	0	0	0	23	0
Debrecen	2015–16	Nemzeti Bajnokság I	10	0	2	0	0	0	6	0	18	0
Debrecen	2016–17	Nemzeti Bajnokság I	5	0	0	0	0	0	0	0	5	0
Debrecen	Total		81	0	29	0	43	0	14	0	167	0
Paks	2017–18	Nemzeti Bajnokság I	20	0	1	0	—		—		21	0
Balmazújváros	2018–19	Nemzeti Bajnokság II	11	0	1	0	—		—		12	0
Career total			112	0	31	0	43	0	14	0	200	0

Updated to games played as on 19 May 2019.

== Honours ==
Debrecen

- Nemzeti Bajnokság I: 2010, 2012
- Magyar Kupa: 2010, 2012

Nagykanizsa

- Nemzeti Bajnokság III – Southwest: 2024–25
