= Selim Bouadla =

French footballer (born 1988)

Personal information
- Date of birth: 26 August 1988 (age 38)
- Place of birth: Rosny-sous-Bois, France
- Height: 1.72 m (5 ft 8 in)
- Position: Midfielder

Youth career
- 1998–2005: US Torcy
- 2005–2007: Le Havre

Senior career*
Years	Team	Apps	(Gls)
2007–2011	Le Havre	56	(1)
2008–2009	→ Paris (loan)	6	(0)
2011–2015	Debrecen	73	(10)
2015–2016	Académica	7	(0)
2016–2018	Slaven Belupo	48	(3)
2018–2020	Laval	11	(0)
- * Club domestic league appearances and goals as of 17:00, 14 December 2020 (UTC)

Selim Bouadla (born 26 August 1988) is a French professional footballer who played as a midfielder most recently for Laval.

== Personal life ==
Bouadla was born in Rosny-sous-Bois in the eastern suburbs of Paris. He holds both French and Algerian nationalities.

== Career ==
=== Le Havre ===
Bouadla was born in Rosny-sous-Bois, Seine-Saint-Denis. He made his Ligue 2 debut with Le Havre AC on 27 July 2007 against SC Bastia. He made his Ligue 1 debut on 20 September 2008, coming on as a substitute against Lyon. On 3 February 2009, he moved on loan to Paris FC.

=== Debrecen ===
On 1 May 2012, Bouadla won the Hungarian Cup with Debrecen by beating MTK Budapest on penalty shoot-out in the 2011–12 season. This was the fifth Hungarian Cup trophy for Debrecen.

On 12 May 2012, Bouadla won the Hungarian League title with Debrecen after beating Pécs in the 28th round of the Hungarian League by 4–0 at the Oláh Gábor út Stadium which resulted the sixth Hungarian League title for the Hajdús.

=== Académica ===
On 18 June 2015, Bouadla signed a two-year deal with Académica. He made his debut in the Primeira Liga on 17 August 2015 in a game against Paços de Ferreira.

=== Slaven Belupo ===
On 17 August 2016, after suffering top division relegation with Académica, Bouadla signed a two-year deal with Croatian club Slaven Belupo.

=== Lavall ===
Bouadla signed a contract with Stade Lavallois in June 2018. He was released at the end of the 2019–20 season.

== Career statistics ==
As of 7 December 2014

Appearances and goals by club, season and competition
Club	Season	League		National cup		League cup		Europe		Total	
Club	Season	Apps	Goals	Apps	Goals	Apps	Goals	Apps	Goals	Apps	Goals
Le Havre	2007–08	17	0	0	0	0	0	0	0	17	0
Le Havre	2008–09	2	0	0	0	1	0	0	0	3	0
Le Havre	2009–10	11	0	0	0	0	0	0	0	11	0
Le Havre	2010–11	26	1	0	0	3	0	0	0	29	1
Le Havre	Total	56	1	0	0	4	0	0	0	60	1
Paris	2008–09	6	0	0	0	0	0	0	0	6	0
Debrecen	2011–12	24	3	5	1	1	1	0	0	30	5
Debrecen	2012–13	14	1	4	0	2	0	0	0	20	1
Debrecen	2013–14	18	4	2	0	4	1	2	0	26	5
Debrecen	2014–15	19	1	2	0	1	0	3	0	22	0
Debrecen	Total	66	8	13	1	8	2	5	0	92	11
Career total		128	9	13	1	12	2	5	0	158	12

== Honours ==
Le Havre

- Ligue 2 Championship: 2008

Debrecen

- Hungarian League: 2012, 2014
- Hungarian Cup: 2012, 2013
