= Norbert Mészáros =

Hungarian footballer

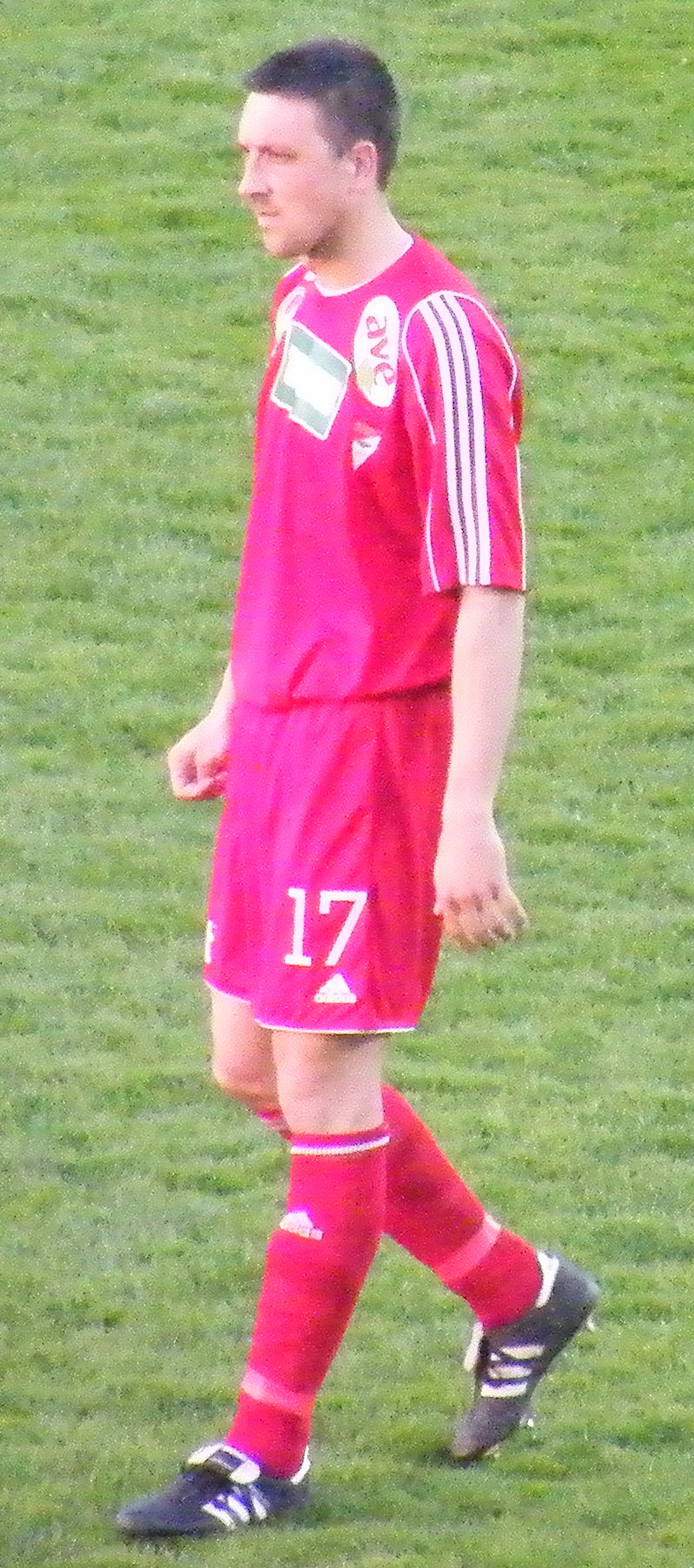

Personal information
- Date of birth: 19 August 1980 (age 46)
- Place of birth: Pápa, Hungary
- Height: 1.91 m (6 ft 3 in)
- Position: Centre back

Team information
- Current team: Hajdúszoboszló

Youth career
- 1994–2000: Pápa

Senior career*
Years	Team	Apps	(Gls)
2000–2002	Dunaújváros	26	(1)
2002–2003	BKV Előre	17	(3)
2003–2004	Siófok	26	(2)
2004–2005	Energie Cottbus	24	(2)
2005–2019	Debrecen	263	(9)
2019–2020	Debrecen II	6	(0)
2020–2022	Tiszafüred	52	(1)
2022–	Hajdúszoboszló	12	(0)

International career
2012–2013	Hungary	9	(0)

Managerial career
- 2019–2020: Debrecen II (player-assistant)
- * Club domestic league appearances and goals as of 12 February 2023

Norbert Mészáros (Hungarian pronunciation: [ˈnorbɛrt ˈmeːsaːroʃ]; born 19 August 1980) is a Hungarian professional footballer who plays for Hajdúszoboszló. He is usually deployed as a central defender but can also play left back.

== Club career ==
Born in Pápa, Mészáros started playing football with his local team Pápai ELC. In 2000, his career took off when he signed for Dunaújváros FC. Other teams he played for include BKV Előre, BFC Siófok and the German team FC Energie Cottbus. Since 2005, Mészáros has played for OTP Bank Liga side Debreceni VSC.

=== Debrecen ===
On 8 September 2010, Mészáros was suspended by UEFA along with teammate Vukašin Poleksić, as a match between Debrecen and Fiorentina in the 2009–10 UEFA Champions League was investigated for match-fixing. Both players appealed and on 5 May 2011 the Court of Arbitration for Sport announced its decision, with the ban of Poleksić being upheld and Mészáros' ban being rescinded. UEFA's evidence against Mészáros failed to prove "to the comfortable satisfaction" of the panel that he violated the rules.

Mészáros won the Hungarian League with Debrecen in the 2009–10 season despite his team losing to Kecskeméti TE in the last match. On 26 May 2010, Debrecen beat Zalaegerszegi TE 3–2 in the Hungarian Cup final at the Ferenc Puskás Stadium.

On 1 May 2012, Mészáros won the Hungarian Cup with Debrecen by beating MTK Budapest on a penalty shoot-out in the 2011–12 season. This was the fifth Hungarian Cup trophy for Debrecen.

On 12 May 2012, Mészáros won another Hungarian League title with Debrecen after beating Pécsi MFC 4–0 at the Stadion Oláh Gábor Út. This was the sixth Hungarian League title for the Hajdús.

In the summer 2019 it was announced, that Mészáros would continue as a playing assistant manager for the second team of Debrecen and also would be available for the first team if they needed him.

== International career ==
Mészáros made his debut for the Hungary national team on 1 June 2012 in the 2–1 win over the Czech Republic in a friendly.

== Career statistics ==
=== Club ===
As of 26 February 2019

Appearances and goals by club, season and competition
Club	Season	League			National cup		League cup		Europe		Total	
Club	Season	Division	Apps	Goals	Apps	Goals	Apps	Goals	Apps	Goals	Apps	Goals
Dunaújváros	2000–01	Nemzeti Bajnokság I	26	1	0	0	0	0	0	0	26	1
BKV Előre	2002–03	Nemzeti Bajnokság II	17	3	2	1	0	0	0	0	19	4
Siófok	2003–04	Nemzeti Bajnokság I	26	2	2	0	0	0	0	0	28	2
Energie Cottbus	2004–05	2. Bundesliga	24	2	0	0	0	0	0	0	24	2
Debrecen	2005–06	Nemzeti Bajnokság I	9	0	0	0	0	0	2	0	11	0
Debrecen	2006–07	Nemzeti Bajnokság I	21	1	8	0	0	0	0	0	29	1
Debrecen	2007–08	Nemzeti Bajnokság I	25	0	1	0	7	0	2	0	35	0
Debrecen	2008–09	Nemzeti Bajnokság I	27	3	3	0	3	0	3	0	36	3
Debrecen	2009–10	Nemzeti Bajnokság I	17	1	2	0	1	0	10	0	30	1
Debrecen	2010–11	Nemzeti Bajnokság I	0	0	0	0	0	0	0	0	0	0
Debrecen	2011–12	Nemzeti Bajnokság I	28	2	6	0	0	0	0	0	34	2
Debrecen	2012–13	Nemzeti Bajnokság I	24	1	1	0	2	0	6	0	33	1
Debrecen	2013–14	Nemzeti Bajnokság I	23	0	1	0	1	0	1	0	26	0
Debrecen	2014–15	Nemzeti Bajnokság I	14	0	1	0	4	1	6	0	25	1
Debrecen	2015–16	Nemzeti Bajnokság I	29	0	2	0	0	0	5	0	36	0
Debrecen	2016–17	Nemzeti Bajnokság I	25	1	0	0	0	0	3	0	28	1
Debrecen	2017–18	Nemzeti Bajnokság I	19	0	7	0	0	0	0	0	26	0
Debrecen	2018–19	Nemzeti Bajnokság I	2	0	4	0	0	0	0	0	6	0
Debrecen	Total		263	9	36	0	18	1	36	0	353	10
Career total			356	17	40	1	17	1	36	0	449	19

=== International ===
Appearances and goals by national team and year
National team	Year	Apps	Goals
Hungary	2012	5	0
Hungary	2013	4	0
Total		9	0

== Honours ==
Debrecen

- Hungarian League: 2010, 2012
- Hungarian Cup: 2010, 2012
