= Pécsi VSK =

Hungarian sports club

Pécsi VSK (Pécsi Vasutas Sportkör) is a Hungarian sports club based in Pécs and may refer to:

== Active departments ==
- Pécsi VSK-Pannonpower - Men's basketball
- Pécsi VSK (men's water polo)
- Pécsi VSK (men's football)
- Pécsi VSK (men's water polo)
- Pécsi VSK (women's football)
- Pécsi VSK (athletics)
- Pécsi VSK (boxing)
- Pécsi VSK (judo)
- Pécsi VSK (ski)
- Pécsi VSK (orienteering)

== Former departments ==
- MiZo Pécsi VSK - Women's basketball
