= József Varga (footballer, born 1988) =

Hungarian footballer

- Varga playing for Tiszakécske in 2026

Personal information
- Date of birth: 6 June 1988 (age 38)
- Place of birth: Debrecen, Hungary
- Height: 1.75 m (5 ft 9 in)
- Position: Defensive midfielder

Team information
- Current team: Tiszakécske
- Number: 33

Youth career
- 2002–2007: Debrecen
- 2007: → Létavértes (loan)

Senior career*
Years	Team	Apps	(Gls)
2007–2016	Debrecen	154	(5)
2013	→ Greuther Fürth (loan)	6	(0)
2013–2014	→ Middlesbrough (loan)	36	(0)
2016–2018	MOL Vidi	45	(0)
2018–2020	Puskás Akadémia	21	(1)
2019	→ Puskás Akadémia II	2	(0)
2020–2024	Debrecen	78	(4)
2024–2025	Kazincbarcika	36	(3)
2025–	Tiszakécske	28	(1)

International career
2009–2010	Hungary U21	7	(0)
2009–2018	Hungary	34	(0)
Medal record
Debreceni VSC
Winner	Hungarian League	2009
Winner	Hungarian League	2010
Winner	Hungarian League	2012
Winner	Hungarian Cup	2008
Winner	Hungarian Cup	2010
Winner	Hungarian Cup	2012
Winner	Hungarian Super Cup	2009
Winner	Hungarian Super Cup	2010
Winner	Hungarian League Cup	2010
Runner-up	Hungarian League Cup	2011
- * Club domestic league appearances and goals as of 31 May 2026

József Varga (Hungarian pronunciation: [ˈjoːʒɛf ˈvɒrɡɒ]; born 6 June 1988) is a Hungarian professional footballer who plays as a defensive midfielder for Tiszakécske.

== Club career ==
=== Early years ===
Varga was seven years old when he started playing football, influenced by his father. Playing primarily as a striker he made his breakthrough in 2000. In the 2007–08 season he started in the Debrecen B team before moving on to play for their A team.

=== Debrecen ===
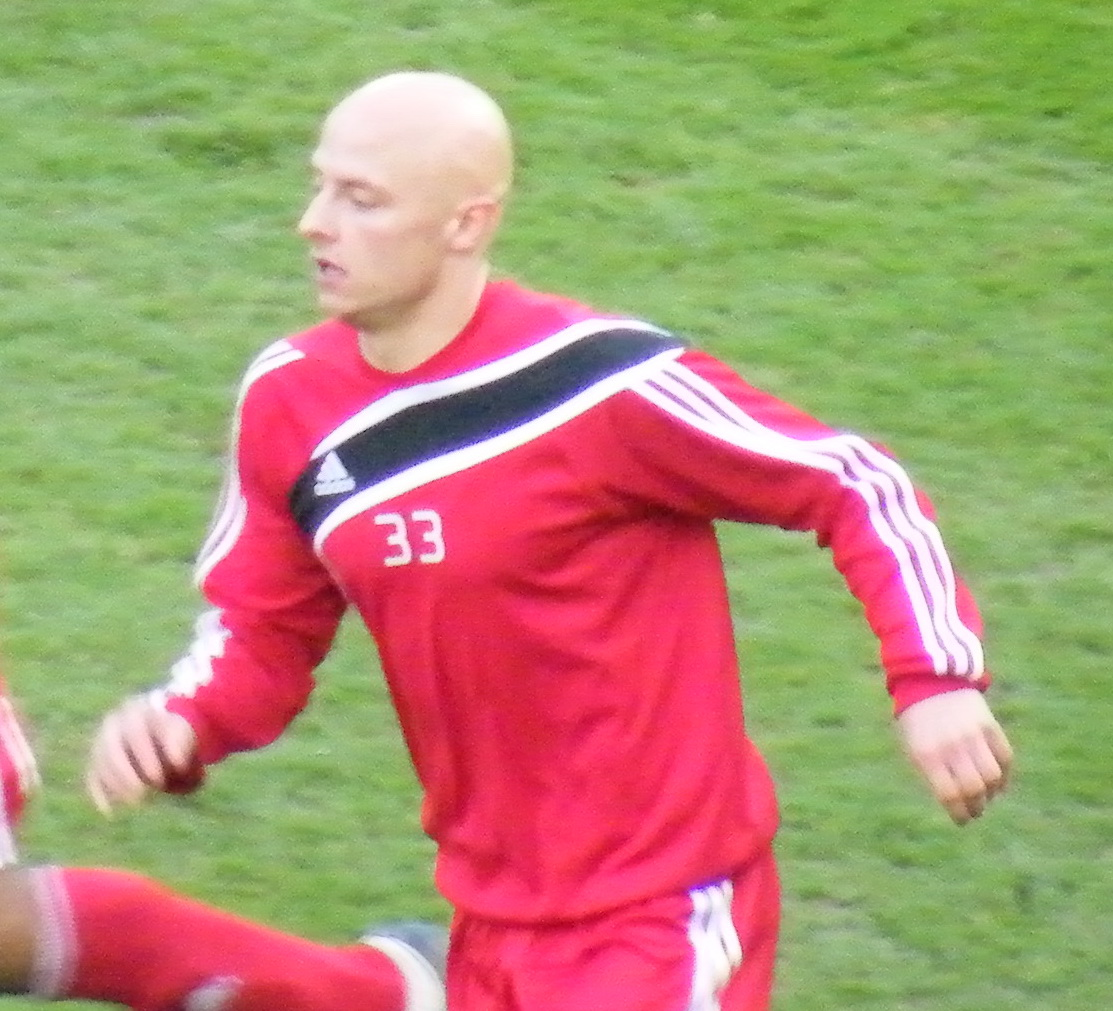
Varga playing for Debrecen

Varga's first trophy was won against Budapest Honvéd by 4–1 on aggregate. The first leg finished 1–1 in the Bozsik Stadion. In the UEFA Champions League 2007–08 season Debrecen entered in the second qualifying round. Debrecen faced with the Swedish champion IF Elfsborg. Debreceni VSC were eliminated from the Champions League 1–0 on aggregate. In the Hungarian League 2007–08 season, Varga's team finished second while MTK became first. Debrecen won the Hungarian Cup in the 2007–08 season by beating Budapest Honvéd in the final 9–1 on aggregate. Debrecen played in the 2008–09 UEFA Cup. In the first round of the Central-East region they drew in Kazakhstan against Shakhter Karagandy 1–1, while in the second leg they beat the Kazakh team by 1–0. Debrecen qualified for the second round by 2–1 on aggregate. In the second round Debrecen faced with the Swiss BSC Young Boys. Debrecen were eliminated from the UEFA Cup by 3–7 on aggregate. Rudolf won the 2008–09 Nemzeti Bajnokság I season after beating their provincial rivals Diósgyőri VTK 3–2 away. In the 2009–10 season, Debrecen played in the UEFA Champions League. After beating Kalmar FF, Levadia Tallinn, and Levski Sofia Debrecen reached the group stages of the 2009–10 UEFA Champions League season. Varga scored a goal against Levski in the Puskás Ferenc Stadium.

On 1 May 2012, Varga won the Hungarian Cup with Debrecen by beating MTK Budapest on penalty shoot-out in the 2011–12 season. This was the fifth Hungarian Cup trophy for Debrecen. On 12 May 2012, Varga won the Hungarian League title with Debrecen after beating Pécs in the 28th round of the Hungarian League by 4–0 at the Oláh Gábor út Stadium which resulted the sixth Hungarian League title for the Hajdús.

=== Greuther Fürth (loan) ===
On 30 January 2013, Varga joined Bundesliga club Greuther Fürth on loan from Debrecen until the end of the 2012–13 Bundesliga season. Varga was watched by several Premier League clubs including Swansea but Varga decided to move to Bavaria. On 1 February 2013, Varga played his first Bundesliga match in 2–1 victory over Schalke 04 in Gelsenkirchen at the Veltins-Arena.

=== Middlesbrough (loan) ===
On 25 June 2013, Varga signed on a season-long loan with English team, Middlesbrough. He was assigned the number 8 shirt previously worn by Newcastle United loanee Sammy Ameobi last season. He made his debut for the English side in the opening match of the 2013–14 Championship season against Leicester City during an eventual 1–2 home loss. He was deployed by manager Tony Mowbray on the right-wing. He was later played at right back against Millwall and Burnley under the new management of Aitor Karanka, both performances were man of the match performances.

At the end of the season Varga returned to Debrecen after Middlesbrough refused to take up the option to buy Varga for €650,000 Middlesbrough boss Aitor Karanka stated this was because Varga was not a natural right back and to employ him as so would be a detriment to the player himself.

== International career ==
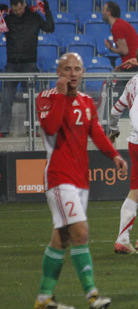
Varga József in a friendly tie against Poland on 15 November 2011

József Varga debuted in the Hungary national team on 10 October 2009 against Portugal. However Hungary lost to 3–0 at the Estádio da Luz in Lisbon Varga's performance was convincing, therefore he became a stable member of the national team during the coaching of the Dutch Erwin Koeman. Since then Varga was called up many times and he even played a defender against Sweden in the Euro 2012 qualifiers at the Puskás Ferenc Stadium because two of the key defenders Roland Juhász and Vilmos Vanczák could not play. Hungary beat 2–1 Sweden so his performance in the defence contributed to the success of the team.

== Career statistics ==
=== Club ===
As of matches played 15 May 2022

Appearances and goals by club, season and competition
Club	Season	League			National Cup		League Cup		Europe		Total	
Club	Season	Division	Apps	Goals	Apps	Goals	Apps	Goals	Apps	Goals	Apps	Goals
Debrecen	2007–08	Nemzeti Bajnokság I	0	0	2	0	6	0	0	0	8	0
Debrecen	2008–09	Nemzeti Bajnokság I	19	0	0	0	4	0	2	0	25	0
Debrecen	2009–10	Nemzeti Bajnokság I	19	1	3	0	2	0	9	3	33	4
Debrecen	2010–11	Nemzeti Bajnokság I	21	0	1	0	3	1	11	0	36	0
Debrecen	2011–12	Nemzeti Bajnokság I	26	1	5	0	0	0	—		31	1
Debrecen	2012–13	Nemzeti Bajnokság I	14	0	1	0	0	0	5	1	20	1
Debrecen	2014–15	Nemzeti Bajnokság I	26	3	1	0	1	0	6	0	34	3
Debrecen	2015–16	Nemzeti Bajnokság I	25	0	4	0	—		6	0	35	0
Debrecen	2016–17	Nemzeti Bajnokság I	4	0	0	0	—		4	0	8	0
Debrecen	Total		154	5	17	0	16	1	43	4	230	9
Greuther Fürth (loan)	2012–13	Bundesliga	6	0	0	0	—	—	—		6	0
Middlesbrough (loan)	2013–14	Championship	34	0	1	0	1	0	—		36	0
Videoton	2016–17	Nemzeti Bajnokság I	17	0	1	0	—		0	0	18	0
Videoton	2017–18	Nemzeti Bajnokság I	25	0	2	0	—		5	0	32	0
Videoton	2018–19	Nemzeti Bajnokság I	3	0	0	0	—		4	0	7	0
Videoton	Total		45	0	3	0	—		9	0	57	0
Puskás Akadémia	2018–19	Nemzeti Bajnokság I	17	1	1	0	—		—		18	1
Puskás Akadémia	2019–20	Nemzeti Bajnokság I	4	0	2	0	—		—		6	0
Puskás Akadémia	Total		21	1	3	0	—		—		24	1
Debrecen	2020–21	Nemzeti Bajnokság II	26	1	3	1	—		—		29	2
Debrecen	2021–22	Nemzeti Bajnokság I	27	1	1	0	—		—		28	1
Debrecen	Total		53	2	4	1	0	0	0	0	57	3
Career total			297	8	27	1	17	1	52	4	393	13

=== International ===
Appearances and goals by national team and year
National team	Year	Apps	Goals
Hungary	2009	2	0
Hungary	2010	1	0
Hungary	2011	7	0
Hungary	2012	8	0
Hungary	2013	7	0
Hungary	2014	6	0
Hungary	2015	0	0
Total		31	0

== Honours ==
=== Club ===
Debrecen

- Hungarian League: 2009, 2010, 2012
- Hungarian Super Cup: 2009, 2010
- Hungarian Cup: 2008, 2010, 2012
- Hungarian League Cup: 2010

=== Individual ===
- Nándor Hidegkuti Prize: 2009
- Zilahi Prize: 2012
