= Bence Ludánszki =

Hungarian footballer

Personal information
- Full name: Bence Ludánszki
- Date of birth: October 25, 1990 (age 36)
- Place of birth: Debrecen, Hungary
- Height: 1.84 m (6 ft 0 in)
- Position: Defender

Team information
- Current team: Kaposvári

Youth career
- 2000–2010: Debrecen

Senior career*
Years	Team	Apps	(Gls)
2010–2013	Debrecen II	54	(5)
2012–2016	Debrecen	13	(1)
2016–	Kaposvári	0	(0)

International career
2010–2011	Hungary U21	1	(0)
- * Club domestic league appearances and goals as of 1 May 2016

Bence Ludánszki (born 25 October 1990) is a Hungarian football defender player who currently plays for Kaposvári. He made his professional debut in the 2012–13 Nemzeti Bajnokság I against Kaposvári Rákóczi FC.

== Career statistics ==
Appearances and goals by club, season and competition
Club	Season	League		Cup		League Cup		Europe		Total	
Club	Season	Apps	Goals	Apps	Goals	Apps	Goals	Apps	Goals	Apps	Goals
Debrecen
Debrecen	2008–09	0	0	3	0	2	0	0	0	5	0
Debrecen	2009–10	0	0	4	1	1	0	0	0	5	1
Debrecen	2010–11	0	0	1	0	0	0	0	0	1	0
Debrecen	2011–12	0	0	2	0	8	1	0	0	10	1
Debrecen	2012–13	1	0	7	2	5	0	0	0	13	2
Debrecen	2013–14	5	1	6	0	7	1	0	0	18	2
Debrecen	2014–15	3	0	2	0	8	1	1	0	14	1
Debrecen	Total	9	1	25	3	31	3	1	0	66	7
Career total		9	1	25	3	31	3	1	0	66	7

Updated to games played as of 9 December 2014.
