= 2011–12 Magyar Kupa =

Tournament details
- Country: Hungary
- Teams: 160

Final positions
- Champions: Debrecen (5th title)
- Runners-up: MTK Budapest

The 2011–12 Magyar Kupa (English: Hungarian Cup) was the 72nd season of Hungary's annual knock-out cup football competition. It started with the first match of Round 1 on 7 August 2011 and ended with the final held in May 2012 at Stadium Puskás Ferenc, Budapest. Kecskemét were the defending champions, having won their first cup competition last season. The winner of the competition will qualify for the second qualifying round of the 2012–13 UEFA Europa League.

== Qualifying phase ==
=== Round 1 ===
Matches were played on 7 August 2011 and involved the teams qualified through the local cup competitions during the previous season and the Nemzeti Bajnokság III teams.

Team #1	Score	Team #2
Jánossomorja SE	3–2	Vép VSE
Petőházi SE	1–3	Répcelaki SE
Kapuvári SE	1–3	Sárvári FC
Szany SE	4–1	Ete SE
Győrszemere KSK	8–0	Ácsi Kinizsi SC
Töltéstava SE	3–1	Egyetértés SE Nemesszalók
Bajcs SE	2–0	Első Magyaróvári TE 1904
FC Táp	0–5	Lombard Pápa Termál FC II
Ikrény SE	3–1	Úrkút SK
Celldömölki VSE	3–1	Egervári TE
Rum KSC	1–4	Kentaur Sprint ASC
Bödei SE	1–1; 3–4 (p.)	Tanakajdi TC
Jáki SE	1–1; 7–8 (p.)	Zalaegerszegi TE II
Révfülöpi NKSE	3–1	Gránit Gyógyf. Zalakaros
Rédics KSE	0–2	Badacsonytomaj-Tapolca
Zalaszentmihályi SE	1–1; 4–5 (p.)	Balatonkeresztúr-Bmáriaf.
Kiskanizsai Sáskák SE	1–5	Buzsák KSE
Szigetvári ZMSE	1–3	Balatonlelle SE
Nagyárpádi SK	0–11	Kaposvári Rákóczi II
Szászvári SE	2–5	Bonyhád VLC
Bácsalmás PVSE	3–4	Pécsi VSK
Garai KSE	0–5	Ócsárdi SE
Bólyi SE	1–0	Tolna VFC
Herendi PSK	0–1	Csákvári TK
Mecset FC Öskü	0–5	Velence SE
Kislődi FC	0–11	Iszkaszentgyörgyi KSE
Madocsa SE	0–6	Bölcskei SE
Sárosd NKSC	2–0	Solti FC

Team #1	Score	Team #2
Adonyi VSK	0–1	Harta SE
Aba Sárvíz FC	w/o	Akasztói FC
Újbuda	1–0	Maglódi TC
Csepel FC Kft.	4–1	Érdi VSE
Gödöllői SK	1–0	Vasas-Híd II
Alsónémedi SE	0–3	Rákosmenti KSK
Diósdi TC	3–2	Soroksár FC
Ferencvárosi FC	1–1; 5–3 (p.)	Tardosi FC
Békéscsabai MÁV SE	1–2	Tisza Volán SC
Magyarbánhegyesi FC	3–4	M Foci Kft.
Csanádpalota FC	0–1	Békéscsabai Jamina SE
Szécsény VSE	2–1	FC Hatvan
Aszód FC	3–1	Nagybátony SC
Szászberek SE	1–0	Tápiószecső FC SZSE
Nagykőrösi Kinizsi Törteli FC	2–0	Törökszentmiklósi FC
Újhartyáni ISE	0–5	Kecskeméti TE II
Varbói Bányász SE	0–4	Felsőtárkány SC
Detk SE	0–4	Putnok VSE
Szendrő VSSZK	3–5	Tiszalúc NSE
Tomor-Lak KSK	4–5	FC Tiszaújváros
Tarnalaleszi Romacsillagok SE	2–0	Gönc VMSE
Nagyrozvágy KSE	1–2	Aszaló SE
Hajdúhadházi FK	0–3	Nagyiváni KSE
Ebesi SKE	3–4	II. Rákóczi Ferenc SE
Bököny KSE	2–2; 4–2 (p.)	Sárrétudvari
Terem SE	2–1	Tiszakóródi SE
Nyírcsaholy SE	0–8	Tiszakanyári SE
Kispalád SC	2–1	Pátrohai LSE

== Round of 128 ==
These matches were played between 14 and 17 August 2011 and involved the winners of Round 1 and the 2011–12 Nemzeti Bajnokság II teams.

Team #1	Score	Team #2
Répcelaki SE	0–3	Soproni VSE
Tanakajdi TC	0–5	Jánossomorja SE
Celldömölki VSE	2–3	Sárvár FC
Badacsonytomaj-Tapolca	0–14	Gyirmót
Iszkaszentgyörgyi KSE	3–6	Győri ETO II
Révfülöpi NKSE	0–3	Győrszemere KSK
Szany SE	1–2	FC Ajka
Bajcs SE	1–9	FC Veszprém
Töltéstava SE	3–2	Lombard-Pápa TFC II
Ikrény SE	0–16	FC Tatabánya
Balatonkeresztúr-Bmáriaf.	2–2 (a.e.t.); 4–5 (pen.)	Zalaegerszegi TE II
Kentaur Sprint ASC	4–1	Balatonlelle SE
Ócsárdi SE	0–4	Bajai LSE
Bólyi SE	3–0	Bonyhád VLC
Pécsi VSK	1–4	Kaposvári Rákóczi FC II
Buzsák KSE	0–5	Kozármisleny
Bölcskei SE	2–3	Dunaújváros PASE
Sárosd NKSC	0–5	Paksi II
Aba Sárvíz FC	0–6	Harta SE
Szászberek SE	0–7	Ceglédi VSE
Kecskeméti TE II	0–2	Szolnoki MÁV
Nagyiváni KSE	3–1	Nagykőrösi Kinizsi Törteli FC

Team #1	Score	Team #2
Békéscsabai Jamina SE	0–1	Szeged 2011
M Foci Kft.	0–6	Békéscsaba 1912 Előre
Tisza Volán SC	3–4	Orosháza
II. Rákóczi Ferenc SE	0–6	Balmazújvárosi FC
Terem SE	1–4	Kazincbarcikai
Tiszakanyári SE	0–3	Mezőkövesd-Zsóry SE
Bököny KSE	1–6	Putnok VSE
FC Tiszaújváros	1–2	Nyíregyháza Spartacus
Kispalád SC	1–2	Aszaló SE
Tiszalúc NSE	0–6	DVSC-DEAC
Aszód FC	1–5	Egri
Felsőtárkány SC	3–4	Budaörsi SC
Szécsény VSE	0–3	Rákospalotai EAC
Tarnalaleszi Romacsillagok SE	1–6	Újpest II
Velence SE	1–2	BKV Előre
Gödöllői SK	0–2	Budapest Honvéd II
Csákvári TK	3–0	Ferencvárosi II
Diósdi TC	0–4	MTK Budapest
Csepel FC	0–0 (a.e.t.); 5–6 (pen.)	Videoton II
Újbuda FC	1–4	Szigetszentmiklósi TK
Rákosmenti KSK	2–0	Vecsési FC
Ferencvárosi FC	0–1	Dunakanyar-Vác

== Round of 64 ==
These matches were played on 21 and 28 September 2011. The winners of Round 2 were joined by the majority of the 2011–12 Nemzeti Bajnokság I teams; sides involved in a European cup competition were given a bye to the next round.

Team 1	Score	Team 2
Győri ETO II	0–0 (a.e.t.); 2–4 (pen.)	Töltéstava SE
Győrszemere KSK	0–10	Lombard-Pápa
Töltéstava SE	2–4	FC Veszprém
Zalaegerszegi TE II	0–2	Siófok
Kentaur Sprint ASC	0–2	Kaposvári Rákóczi
Paksi II	0–3	Pécsi
Harta SE	2–4 (a.e.t.)	Kozármisleny
Bólyi SE	2–5	Bajai LSE
Dunakanyar-Vác	1–4	Újpest
Szigetszentmiklósi TK	2–1	Budapest Honvéd
Budaörsi SC	0–2	Vasas
MTK Budapest	4–0	Rákospalotai EAC
BKV Előre	3–0	Dunaújváros PASE
Csákvári TK	2–1	Budapest Honvéd II
Rákosmenti KSK	4–1	Újpest II
Ceglédi VSE	3–0	Orosháza
Szolnoki MÁV	1–1 (a.e.t.); 4–1 (pen.)	Szeged 2011
Nagyiváni KSE	1–3	Békéscsaba 1912 Előre
Egri	0–0 (a.e.t.); 2–4 (pen.)	Diósgyőri
Kazincbarcikai	1–5	Debreceni VSC
Mezőkövesd-Zsóry SE	4–1	Nyíregyháza Spartacus
Putnok VSE	3–0	DVSC-DEAC
Aszaló SE	0–2	Balmazújvárosi FC
Soproni VSE	0–2	Szombathelyi Haladás
Jánossomorja SE	3–1	Sárvári FC
Videoton II	0–3	Győri ETO
Gyirmót	3–3 (a.e.t.); 5–4 (pen.)	FC Ajka
Kaposvári Rákóczi FC II	1–0	Zalaegerszegi

== Round of 32 ==
Entering this stage of the competition were the 28 winners from the previous round and the four clubs which competed in Europe this season.

Team 1	Score	Team 2
FC Veszprém	0–2	Szombathelyi Haladás
Kaposvári Rákóczi II	3–2	Gyirmót
BKV Előre	1–4	Diósgyőri
Kozármisleny	2–1	Siófok
Jánossomorja SE	2–9	Győri ETO
Balmazújvárosi FC	1–2	MTK Budapest
Békéscsaba 1912 Előre	3–2	Vasas
Szigetszentmiklósi TK	3 – 3 (a.e.t.); 3–4 (pen.)	Újpest
Ceglédi VSE	0–2	Debreceni VSC
Bajai LSE	1 – 1 (a.e.t.); 4–3 (pen.)	Lombard-Pápa
Csákvári TK	2 – 3 (a.e.t.)	Pécsi
Rákosmenti KSK	0 – 1 (a.e.t.)	Kaposvári Rákóczi
Putnok VSE	3–2	Paks
Tatabánya	0–2	Videoton
Szolnoki MÁV	2–5	Ferencváros
Mezőkövesd-Zsóry SE	2–3	Kecskemét

== Final stage ==
=== Bracket ===
First round
1	Békéscsaba (a)	0	2	2
16	Ferencváros	0	2	2
8	MTK Budapest (a)	0	2	2
9	Pécsi	1	2	2
5	Videoton	1	0	1
12	Szombathelyi Haladás	0	0	0
4	Diósgyőri	1	1	2
13	Győri ETO	1	4	5
6	Putnok VSE	1	0	1
11	Kaposvári Rákóczi	1	3	4
3	Kecskemét	1	1	2
14	Debreceni VSC	2	1	3
7	Bajai LSE	2	0	2
10	Kozármisleny	0	0	0
2	Kaposvári Rákóczi II	2	0	2
15	Újpest (a)	0	2	2

Quarter-finals
Békéscsaba	0	0	0
MTK Budapest	3	3	6
Videoton	5	1	6
Győri ETO	1	0	1
Kaposvári Rákóczi	0	0	0
Debreceni VSC	1	0	1
Bajai LSE	1	0	1
Újpest	3	4	7

Semi-finals
MTK Budapest	2	2	4
Videoton	3	0	3
Debreceni VSC	2	3	5
Újpest	1	1	2

Final
MTK Budapest	3 (7)
Debreceni VSC	3 (8)

== Round of 16 ==
The sixteen winners of the previous round were drawn into eight two-legged matches. The winners on aggregate advanced to the next round. The first leg will be played on 30 November, the second leg is on 3 December 2011.

Team 1	Agg.	Team 2	1st leg	2nd leg
Békéscsaba 1912 Előre	2–2 (a)	Ferencváros	0–0	2–2
Diósgyőri	2–5	Győri ETO	1–1	1–4
Kecskemét	2–3	Debreceni VSC	1–2	1–1
Putnok VSE	1–4	Kaposvári Rákóczi	1–1	0–3
MTK Budapest	2–2 (a)	Pécsi	0–1	2–1
Videoton	1–0	Szombathelyi Haladás	1–0	0–0
Kaposvári Rákóczi II	2–3	Újpest	2–1	0–2
Bajai LSE	2–0	Kozármisleny	2–0	0–0

== Quarter-finals ==
As in the previous round, ties were played over two legs. The winners advanced to the semi-finals.

Team 1	Agg.	Team 2	1st leg	2nd leg
Bajai LSE	1–7	Újpest	1–3	0–4
Kaposvári Rákóczi	0–1	Debreceni VSC	0–1	0–0
Békéscsaba 1912 Előre	0–6	MTK Budapest	0–3	0–3
Videoton	6–1	Győri ETO	5–1	1–0

=== First leg ===
25 February 2012
14:00 (UTC+1)

Bajai LSE	1–3	Újpest
Kormos 76' (pen.)		54' Remili; 64', 68' Kabát

Vasvári Pál utcai Stadion, Baja
Referee: Szilasi

25 February 2012
14:00 (UTC+1)

Kaposvári Rákóczi	0–1	Debreceni VSC
		81' Coulibaly

Stadion Kaposvár Rákóczi, Kaposvár
Referee: Nemeth

25 February 2012
14:00 (UTC+1)

Békéscsaba 1912 Előre	0–3	MTK Budapest
		14' Tischler; 31' Könyves; 77' Kanta

Stadion Kórház utcai, Békéscsaba
Referee: Veizer

25 February 2012
16:00 (UTC+1)

Videoton	5–1	Győri ETO
Fernández 14'; Nikolić 38' (pen.); Sándor 48' (pen.); Oliveira 69'; Torghelle 90'		85' Windecker

Sóstói Stadion, Székesfehérvár
Referee: Solymosi

=== Second leg ===
13 March 2012
16:00 (UTC+1)

Újpest	4–0	Bajai LSE
Remili 3', 53'; Pollák 18'; Proesmans 37'

Szusza Ferenc Stadium, Budapest
Referee: Varga

13 March 2012
17:00 (UTC+1)

Debreceni VSC	0–0	Kaposvári Rákóczi

Stadion Oláh Gábor Út, Debrecen
Referee: Szilasi

14 March 2012
17:30 (UTC+1)

MTK Budapest	3–0	Békéscsaba 1912 Előre
Könyves 33'; Gál 69'; Molnár 87'

Hidegkuti Nándor Stadium, Budapest
Referee: Kiss

14 March 2012
18:00 (UTC+1)

Győri ETO	0–1	Videoton
		Perić 10'

ETO Park, Győr
Referee: Szots

== Semi-finals ==
Ties in the semi-finals were also played over two legs.

Team 1	Agg.	Team 2	1st leg	2nd leg
MTK Budapest	4–3	Videoton	2–3	2–0
Debreceni VSC	5–2	Újpest	2–1	3–1

=== First leg ===
21 March 2012
17:00 (UTC+1)

MTK Budapest	2–3	Videoton
Könyves 6', 26'		Nikolić 53', 85' (pen.); Torghelle 63'

Hidegkuti Nándor Stadium, Budapest
Referee: Mihaly

21 March 2012
19:15 (UTC+1)

Debreceni VSC	2–1	Újpest
Méyé 5'; Lucas 49'		Kabát 38'

Stadion Oláh Gábor Út, Debrecen
Referee: Farkas

=== Second leg ===
10 April 2012
18:00 (UTC+1)

Videoton	0–2	MTK Budapest
		Kanta 21'; Tischler 31'

Sóstói Stadion, Székesfehérvár

11 April 2012
18:00 (UTC+1)

Újpest	1–3	Debreceni VSC
Kabát 56'		Bódi 58', 85'; Szakály 90'

Szusza Ferenc Stadium, Budapest

== Final ==
1 May 2012
18:00 (UTC+2)

MTK Budapest	3–3 (a.e.t.)	Debreceni VSC
Könyves 45'; Ladányi 62'; Zsidai 87'	Report	Bouadla 51'; Szakály 55', 89'
Penalties
Vukmir (penalty scored); Zsidai (penalty scored); Vass (penalty scored); Wolfe (penalty missed); Kanta (penalty scored); Szekeres (penalty scored); Pál (penalty scored); Könyves (penalty scored); Kálnoki-Kis (penalty missed)	7–8	(penalty scored) Szakály; (penalty scored) Nagy; (penalty scored) Bouadla; (penalty scored) Lucas; (penalty missed) Coulibaly; (penalty scored) Korhut; (penalty scored) Šimac; (penalty scored) Varga; (penalty scored) Mészáros

Ferenc Puskás Stadium, Budapest
Attendance: 3,500
Referee: Zsolt Szabó

== See also ==
- 2011–12 Nemzeti Bajnokság I
- 2011–12 Nemzeti Bajnokság II
- 2011–12 Nemzeti Bajnokság III
- 2011–12 Ligakupa
