= Mihály Korhut =

Hungarian footballer

Personal information
- Date of birth: 1 December 1988 (age 37)
- Place of birth: Miskolc, Hungary
- Height: 1.81 m (5 ft 11 in)
- Position: Left back

Youth career
- 2003–2005: Monori Sportszolgáltató
- 2005–2006: Debrecen

Senior career*
Years	Team	Apps	(Gls)
2007–2016	Debrecen	152	(7)
2007–2008	→ Létavértes (loan)	38	(14)
2008–2010	→ Debrecen B	69	(4)
2011	→ Kaposvár (loan)	10	(0)
2013	→ Debrecen B	2	(1)
2016–2019	Hapoel Be'er Sheva	41	(1)
2019–2020	Aris	42	(2)
2020–2022	Debrecen	36	(2)
2022–2025	DEAC	47	(7)

International career
2014–2019	Hungary	22	(1)
- * Club domestic league appearances and goals

Mihály Korhut (Hungarian pronunciation: [ˈmihaːj ˈkorhut]; born 1 December 1988) is a retired Hungarian international footballer.

== Club career ==
Korhut was born in Debrecen. On 26 November 2006, he made his debut for Debreceni VSC in a 6–1 home loss over FC Sopron. On 1 May 2012, he won the Hungarian Cup with Debrecen by beating MTK Budapest on penalty shoot-out in the 2011–12 season. This was the fifth Hungarian Cup trophy for Debrecen. On 12 May 2012, Korhut won the Hungarian League title with Debrecen after beating Pécs in the 28th round of the Hungarian League by 4–0 at the Oláh Gábor út Stadium, which resulted the sixth Hungarian League title for the Hajdús.

On 29 August 2016, he signed a three years contract with Israeli club Hapoel Be'er Sheva on a transfer fee in the range of €500,000.

On 12 January 2019, he signed a contract with Aris of the Super League on a free-transfer. On 5 May 2019, in the last matchday of the 2018–19 season, Korhut scored his first goal for the club in a remarkable 7–2 home win against Xanthi.

On 6 June 2020, he sealed a 3–1 home win against OFI for the 2019–20 Super League play-offs after an 80-day enforced COVID-19 break.

On 22 July 2020, he signed with Debrecen on a free transfer.

On 20 July 2022, Korhut joined Debreceni EAC.

== International career ==
Korhut was selected for the Hungary national team's Euro 2016 squad.

Korhut played in the last group match in a 3–3 draw against Portugal at the Parc Olympique Lyonnais, Lyon on 22 June 2016.

== Career statistics ==
=== Club ===
As of 15 May 2022

Appearances and goals by club, season and competition
Club	Season	League			Cup		League Cup		Europe		Total	
Club	Season	Division	Apps	Goals	Apps	Goals	Apps	Goals	Apps	Goals	Apps	Goals
Debrecen	2008–09	Nemzeti Bajnokság I	0	0	1	0	3	0	0	0	4	0
Debrecen	2009–10	Nemzeti Bajnokság I	2	0	5	0	5	0	0	0	12	0
Debrecen	2010–11	Nemzeti Bajnokság I	1	0	2	0	0	0	0	0	3	0
Debrecen	2011–12	Nemzeti Bajnokság I	29	1	5	1	0	0	0	0	34	2
Debrecen	2012–13	Nemzeti Bajnokság I	26	1	3	0	5	2	5	0	39	3
Debrecen	2013–14	Nemzeti Bajnokság I	28	2	1	0	1	0	2	0	32	2
Debrecen	2014–15	Nemzeti Bajnokság I	28	0	0	0	3	0	6	0	37	0
Debrecen	2015–16	Nemzeti Bajnokság I	31	2	3	0	0	0	6	0	40	2
Debrecen	2016–17	Nemzeti Bajnokság I	6	1	0	0	0	0	3	0	9	1
Debrecen	2020–21	Nemzeti Bajnokság II	22	1	0	0	–	–	–	–	22	1
Debrecen	2021–22	Nemzeti Bajnokság I	14	1	0	0	–	–	–	–	14	1
Debrecen	Total		187	9	20	1	17	2	22	0	246	12
Kaposvár (loan)	2010–11	Nemzeti Bajnokság I	10	0	4	0	0	0	0	0	14	0
Hapoel Be'er Sheva	2016–17	Israeli Premier League	22	0	1	0	1	1	6	0	30	1
Hapoel Be'er Sheva	2017–18	Israeli Premier League	9	0	2	0	2	0	12	0	25	0
Hapoel Be'er Sheva	2018–19	Israeli Premier League	10	1	0	0	1	0	0	0	11	1
Hapoel Be'er Sheva	Total		41	1	3	0	4	1	18	0	66	2
Aris	2018–19	Super League Greece	14	1	0	0	0	0	0	0	14	1
Aris	2019–20	Super League Greece	28	1	0	0	0	4	0	0	32	1
Aris	Total		42	2	0	0	0	0	4	0	46	2
Career total			280	11	36	1	21	2	40	0	381	14

=== International ===
As of matches played on 27 November 2019

Appearances and goals by national team and year
National team	Year	Apps	Goals
Hungary	2014	4	0
Hungary	2015	0	0
Hungary	2016	4	0
Hungary	2017	5	0
Hungary	2018	2	0
Hungary	2019	7	1
Total		22	1

As of matches played on 27 November 2019
Scores and results list Hungary's goal tally first, score column indicates score after each Korhut goal.

List of international goals scored by Mihály Korhut
No.	Date	Venue	Opponent	Score	Result	Competition
1	13 October 2019	Groupama Arena, Budapest, Hungary	Azerbaijan	1–0	1–0	UEFA Euro 2020 qualification

== Honours ==
Debrecen

- Hungarian League: 2009-2010, 2011-2012, 2013-2014
- Hungarian Cup: 2009-2010, 2011-2012, 2012-2013
- Hungarian League Cup: 2009–10

Hapoel Be'er Sheva

- Israeli Premier League: 2016–17, 2017–18
- Israel Super Cup: 2017
- Toto cup top Division: 2016–17
