= Létavértes =

- Town
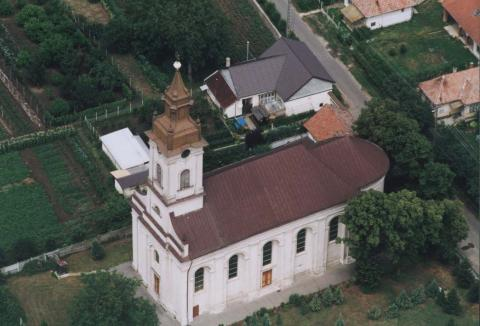
- Greek Catholic Church (2007)

- Flag Coat of arms

- Location within Hungary
- Coordinates: 47°23′N 21°54′E
- Country: Hungary
- County: Hajdú-Bihar
- District: Derecske

Area
  - Total: 116.62 km^{2} (45.03 sq mi)

Population (2015)
  - Total: 7,061
  - Density: 60.6/km^{2} (157/sq mi)
- Time zone: UTC+1 (CET)
  - Summer (DST): UTC+2 (CEST)
- Postal code: 4281
- Area code: (+36) 52
- Website: www.letavertes.hu

Létavértes (Romanian: Leta Mare) is a town in Hajdú-Bihar county, in the Northern Great Plain region of eastern Hungary.

== Geography ==
It covers an area of 116.62 km^{2} (45 sq mi) and has a population of 7061 people (2015).

== Sport ==
- Létavértes SC: association football team

== International relations ==
=== Twin towns – Sister cities ===
Létavértes is twinned with:

- Săcueni, Romania
