= Oláh Gábor utcai Stadion =

Football stadium in Debrecen, Hungary

Coordinates: 47.5496°N 21.6389°E

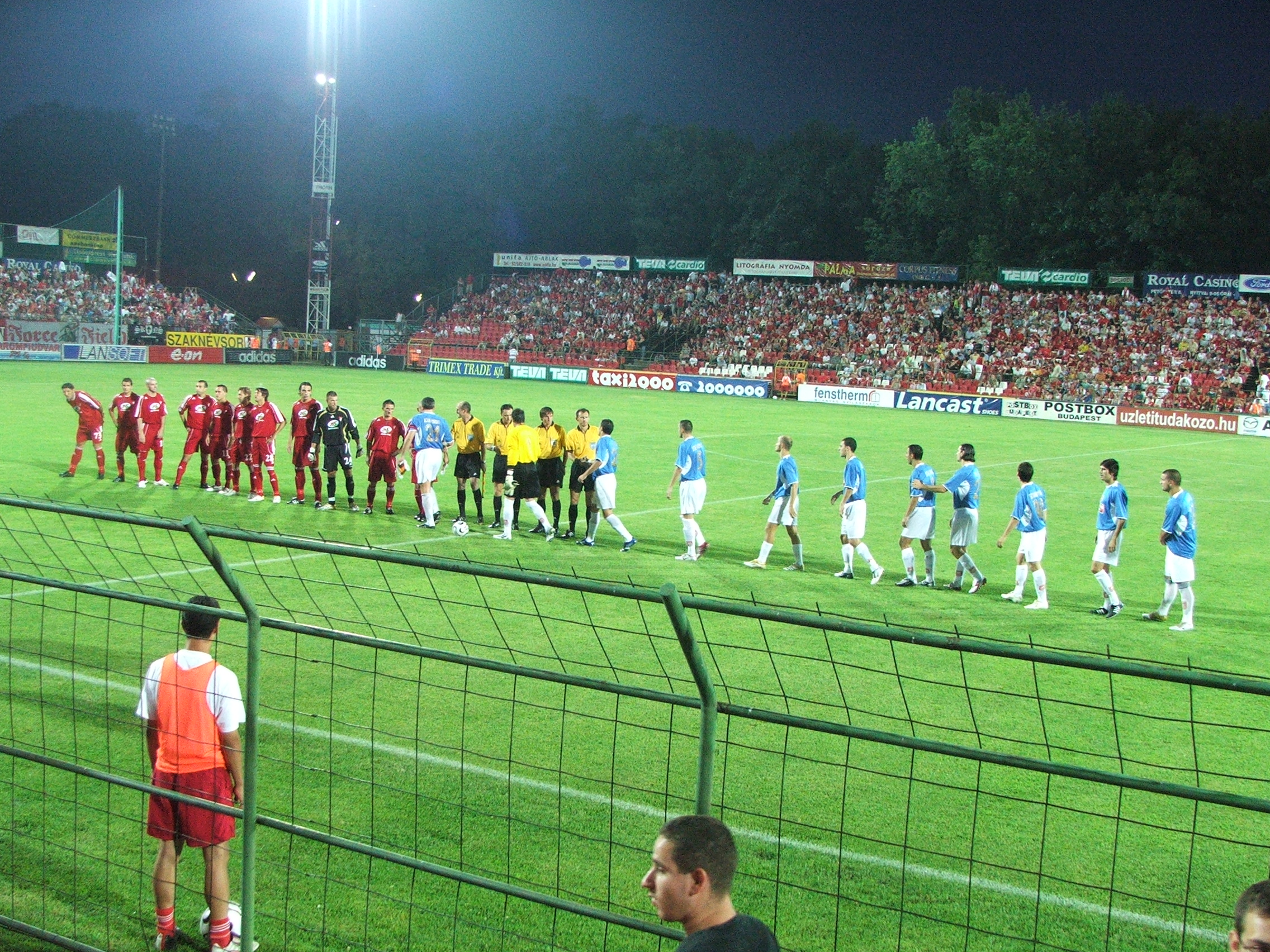
- Interactive map of Oláh Gábor utcai Stadion
- Full name: Oláh Gábor utcai Stadion
- Location: Debrecen, Hungary
- Owner: City of Debrecen
- Capacity: 9,640
- Surface: Grass; Field
- Field size: 105 m × 68 m (344 ft × 223 ft)

Tenant
- Debreceni VSC (1993–2014)

Website
- www.magyarfutball.hu

Stadion Oláh Gábor Út is a multi-use stadium in Debrecen, Hungary. It is currently used mostly for football matches and was the home stadium of Debreceni VSC. The stadium is able to hold 10,200 people. It was replaced by Nagyerdei Stadion in 2014.

== Gallery ==
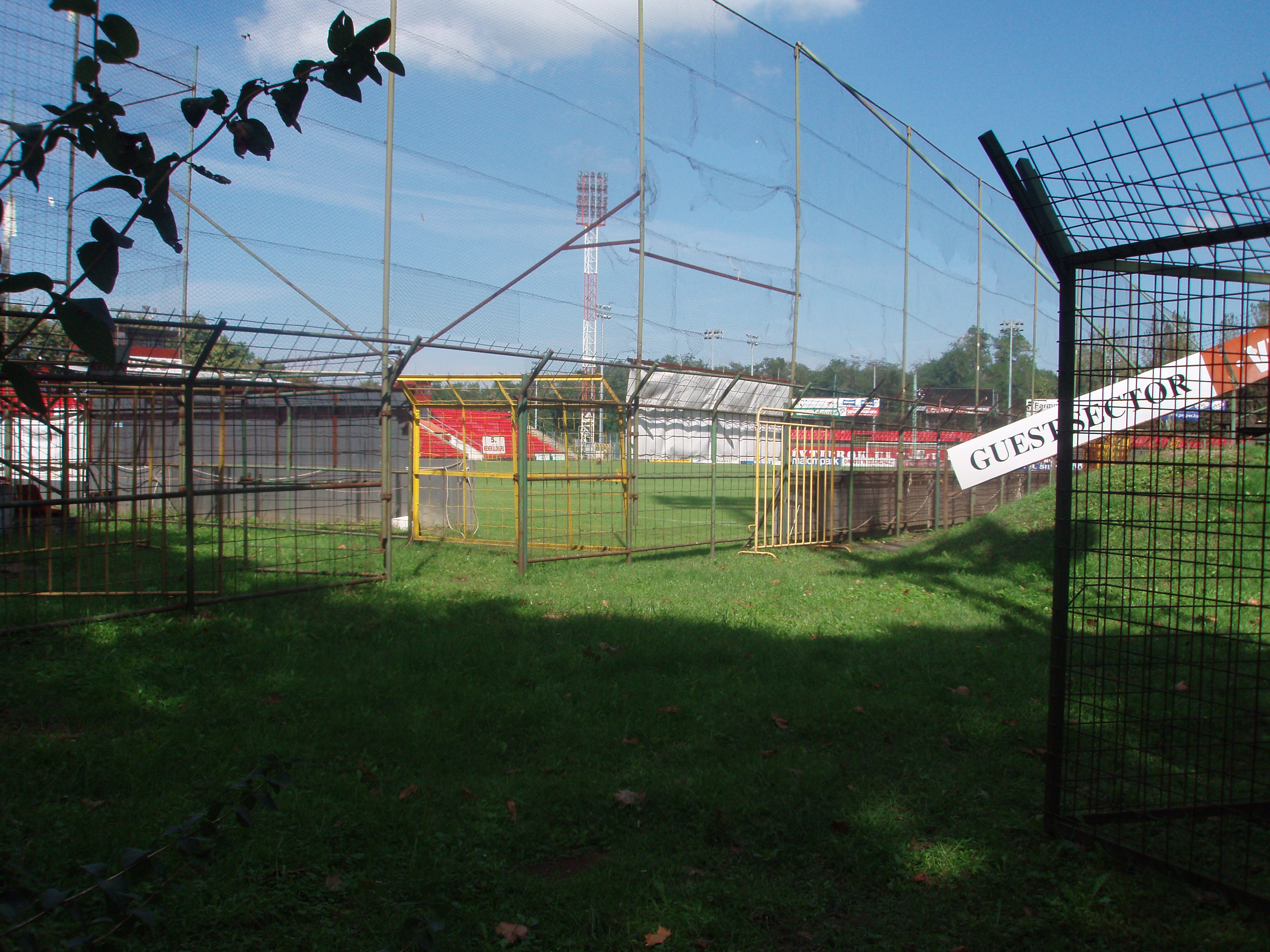
the pitch from outside

== Attendances ==
As of 24 May 2016.

Season	Average
2011–12	7,207
2012–13	4,533
2013–14	7,500
