= 2006–07 Debreceni VSC season =

Debrecen
2006–07 season
- Manager: Miroslav Beránek
- Stadium: Oláh Gábor utcai Stadion
- Nemzeti Bajnokság I: 1st
- Magyar Kupa: Runners-up
- Szuperkupa: Winners
- UEFA Champions League: Second qualifying round
- Top goalscorer: League: Ibrahima Sidibe (17); All: Ibrahima Sidibe (20)
- Highest home attendance: 10,500(multiple Nemzeti Bajnokság I matches)
- Lowest home attendance: 5,000 (multiple Nemzeti Bajnokság I matches)
- Average home league attendance: 7,566
- Biggest win: 6–1 v Sopron (Away, 25 November 2006, Nemzeti Bajnokság I)
- Biggest defeat: 1–4 v Rabotnicki (Away, 2 August 2006, UEFA Champions League)

The 2006–07 season was Debreceni Vasutas Sport Club's 33rd competitive season, 14th consecutive season in the Nemzeti Bajnokság I and 94th season in existence as a football club. In addition to the domestic league, Debrecen participated in that season's editions of the Magyar Kupa, the Szuperkupa and the UEFA Champions League.

== Squad ==
Squad at end of season

Note: Flags indicate national team as defined under FIFA eligibility rules; some limited exceptions apply. Players may hold more than one non-FIFA nationality.

No.	Pos.	Nation	Player
2	DF	HUN	István Szűcs
3	DF	HUN	Csaba Szatmári
4	MF	HUN	Leandro
5	DF	SRB	Dragan Vukmir
6	DF	HUN	Zoltán Takács
7	MF	HUN	Tibor Dombi
8	FW	MKD	Aco Stojkov
9	MF	HUN	Tamás Sándor
11	MF	BRA	Marco Túlio
12	GK	HUN	János Balogh
13	DF	HUN	Péter Bíró
14	FW	FRA	Jimmy Jones Tchana
15	DF	HUN	Aladár Virág
16	DF	HUN	Ádám Komlósi

No.	Pos.	Nation	Player
17	FW	HUN	Norbert Mészáros
18	FW	HUN	Róbert Zsolnai
19	MF	HUN	Balázs Dzsudzsák
20	MF	HUN	Róbert Nagy
21	MF	GAB	Thierry Issiémou
22	DF	HUN	Csaba Bernáth
23	FW	HUN	Péter Szilágyi
24	GK	HUN	Norbert Csernyánszki
26	FW	SEN	Ibrahima Sidibe
28	DF	HUN	Zoltán Nagy
29	MF	HUN	István Spitzmüller
30	MF	HUN	Zoltán Kiss
31	GK	HUN	Zsolt Hamar

== Transfers ==
=== Transfers in ===
Transfer window	Pos.	No.	Player	From
Summer	N/A	–	(Hungary) Mihály Tóth	Derecske
Summer	MF	4	(Hungary) Leandro	Ferencváros
Summer	MF	13	(Hungary) Zoltán Balogh	Tatabánya
Summer	FW	18	(Hungary) Róbert Zsolnai	Kaposvár
Summer	MF	23	(Hungary) László Rezes	Létavértes
Summer	GK	31	(Hungary) Zsolt Hamar	Mátészalka
Winter	DF	6	(Hungary) Zoltán Takács	Honvéd
Winter	FW	8	(North Macedonia) Aco Stojkov	(Serbia) Partizan
Winter	MF	11	(Brazil) Marco Túlio	(Bolivia) Wilstermann
Winter	DF	13	(Hungary) Péter Bíró	Baktalórántháza
Winter	FW	14	(France) Jimmy Jones Tchana	(Greece) Kalamata
Winter	MF	21	(Gabon) Thierry Issiémou	(Gabon) Téléstar
Winter	FW	23	(Hungary) Péter Szilágyi	Létavértes

=== Transfers out ===
Transfer window	Pos.	No.	Player	To
Summer	MF	–	(Hungary) Tamás Huszák	Diósgyőr
Summer	FW	31	(Hungary) István Ferenczi	Zalaegerszeg
Autumn	DF	73	(Hungary) László Éger	(Spain) Poli Ejido
Winter	N/A	–	(Hungary) Bálint Leiter	Ebes
Winter	N/A	–	(Hungary) Balázs Pápay	Ófehértó
Winter	GK	1	(Croatia) Sandro Tomić	Honvéd
Winter	MF	6	(Hungary) Béla Virág	(Germany) Sachsen Leipzig
Winter	MF	8	(Hungary) Csaba Madar	Nyíregyháza
Winter	FW	11	(Montenegro) Bojan Brnović	Győr
Winter	MF	13	(Hungary) Zoltán Balogh	Tatabánya
Winter	DF	14	(Hungary) Gyula Hegedűs	Diósgyőr
Winter	MF	21	(Croatia) Ronald Habi	Újpest
Winter	MF	81	(Hungary) Zoltán Böőr	Győr

=== Loans in ===
Transfer window	Pos.	No.	Player	From	End date

=== Loans out ===
Transfer window	Pos.	No.	Player	To	End date
Summer	GK	12	(Hungary) János Balogh	Nyíregyháza	Middle of season
Summer	DF	15	(Hungary) Aladár Virág	Győr	Middle of season
Summer	MF	28	(Hungary) Péter Halmosi	(England) Plymouth Argyle	End of season
Autumn	DF	2	(Hungary) Péter Máté	(England) Reading	End of season
Winter	FW	10	(Serbia) Igor Bogdanović	Honvéd	End of season
Winter	MF	23	(Hungary) László Rezes	Kecskemét	End of season

== Competitions ==
=== Overview ===
Competition	First match	Last match	Starting round	Final position	Record							
Competition	First match	Last match	Starting round	Final position	Pld	W	D	L	GF	GA	GD	Win %
Nemzeti Bajnokság I	29 July 2006	26 May 2007	Matchday 1	Winners	30	22	3	5	63	21	+42	73.33
Magyar Kupa	25 October 2006	9 May 2007	Round of 32	Runners-up	8	5	3	0	14	5	+9	62.50
Szuperkupa	17 July 2006	20 July 2006	Final	Winners	2	2	0	0	3	1	+2	100.00
UEFA Champions League	26 July 2006	2 August 2006	Second qualifying round	Second qualifying round	2	0	1	1	2	5	−3	0.00
Total					42	29	7	6	82	32	+50	69.05

Source: Competitions

=== Szuperkupa ===
Debrecen, as Nemzeti Bajnokság I winners in the previous season, played against Fehérvár in the 2006 Szuperkupa, who themselves won the Magyar Kupa.

17 July 2006 First leg	Fehérvár	0–1	Debrecen	Székesfehérvár
20:00 CEST (UTC+2)	Vincze (red card) 26'; G. Horváth II (yellow card) 35'	Report	Bogdanović 4'; Éger (yellow card) 75'; Máté (yellow card) 90'	Stadium: Sóstói Stadion; Attendance: 2,000; Referee: Ferenc Bede; Assistant referees: T. Vámos, P. Solymosi

20 July 2006 Second leg	Debrecen	2–1 (3–1 agg.)	Fehérvár	Debrecen
20:00 CEST (UTC+2)	Szatmári (yellow card) 13'; Halmosi (yellow card) 20'; Bernáth (yellow card) 34' (yellow-red card) 74'; Dombi (yellow card) 41'; Dzsudzsák 51'; Éger (yellow card) 69'; Koller 85' (o.g.)	Report	G. Horváth II 6', (yellow card) 70'; Božić (yellow card) 11'; Kuttor (yellow card) 55'; Koller (yellow card) 76'; F. Horváth (yellow card) 90'	Stadium: Oláh Gábor utcai Stadion; Attendance: 7,500; Referee: Mihály Fábián; Assistant referees: Dr. P. Hegyi, I. Tóth
Note: Debrecen won 3–1 on aggregate.

=== Nemzeti Bajnokság I ===
==== League table ====
Pos	Team	Pld	W	D	L	GF	GA	GD	Pts	Qualification or relegation
1	Debrecen (C)	30	22	3	5	63	21	+42	69	Qualification for the Champions League second qualifying round
2	MTK	30	19	4	7	61	33	+28	61	Qualification for the UEFA Cup first qualifying round
3	Zalaegerszeg	30	17	4	9	54	38	+16	55	Qualification for the Intertoto Cup second round
4	Újpest	30	15	4	11	39	32	+7	46 (Note: Újpest were deducted three points due to federation decision.)	
5	Vasas	30	13	6	11	43	41	+2	45	

Source: soccerway.com
(C) Champions

==== Results summary ====
Overall								Home						Away					
Pld	W	D	L	GF	GA	GD	Pts	W	D	L	GF	GA	GD	W	D	L	GF	GA	GD
30	22	3	5	63	21	+42	69	13	1	1	34	9	+25	9	2	4	29	12	+17

Source: Hungarian Football Federation

==== Results by round ====
Round	1	2	3	4	5	6	7	8	9	10	11	12	13	14	15	16	17	18	19	20	21	22	23	24	25	26	27	28	29	30
Ground	H	A	H	A	H	H	A	H	A	H	A	H	A	H	A	A	H	A	H	A	A	H	A	H	A	H	A	H	A	H
Result	W	D	W	W	W	W	L	W	L	D	D	L	W	W	W	W	W	W	W	W	L	W	W	W	W	W	L	W	W	W
Position	6	6	3	2	1	1	3	3	3	3	3	5	4	3	3	3	2	2	2	1	2	1	1	1	1	1	1	1	1	1
Points	3	4	7	10	13	16	16	19	19	20	21	21	24	27	30	33	36	39	42	45	45	48	51	54	57	60	60	63	66	69

Source: Matches
A = Away; H = Home; W = Win; D = Draw; L = Loss

==== Matches ====
29 July 2006 1	Debrecen	2–1	Pécs	Debrecen
20:00 CEST (UTC+2)	Sidibe 9'; Z. Balogh (yellow card) 32'; Z. Kiss 47'; Szatmári (yellow card) 63'	Report	Pest 40'; Lantos (yellow card) 68'	Stadium: Oláh Gábor utcai Stadion; Attendance: 5,000; Referee: Károly Török; Assistant referees: Attila Kelemen, Zsolt Márton; Fourth official: Miklós Demeter

6 August 2006 2	Paks	0–0	Debrecen	Paks
17:30 CEST (UTC+2)	Molnár (yellow card) 20' (yellow-red card) 78'; Tamási (yellow card) 35'; A. Fehér (red card) 85'	Report	Éger (yellow card) 35'; Komlósi (yellow card) 90+1'	Stadium: Fehérvári úti Stadion; Attendance: 4,000; Referee: Ferenc Bede; Assistant referees: Tibor Vámos, Vencel Tóth II; Fourth official: Gábor Péter Kovács

21 August 2006 3	Debrecen	3–0	Vasas	Debrecen
18:00 CEST (UTC+2)	Halmosi 9'; Éger 66' (pen.); B. Virág 90'	Report		Stadium: Oláh Gábor utcai Stadion; Attendance: 6,500; Referee: Tamás Arany; Assistant referees: László Viszokai, Dr. Zsolt Varga; Fourth official: Róbert Nagy

25 August 2006 4	Kaposvár	1–2	Debrecen	Kaposvár
19:00 CEST (UTC+2)	Grúz (yellow card) 33'; Andruskó 55'; Kovácsevics (yellow card) 57'	Report	Bogdanović 15'; Bernáth (yellow card) 47'; B. Virág (yellow card) 51'; Sidibe (yellow card) 55'; Hegedűs (yellow card) 86'; Z. Kiss 87'	Stadium: Rákóczi Stadion; Attendance: 2,000; Referee: István Vad; Assistant referees: Róbert Kispál, Zoltán Kis; Fourth official: András Sóthy

11 September 2006 5	Debrecen	4–0	Vác	Debrecen
18:00 CEST (UTC+2)	Vukmir (yellow card) 18'; Brnović 22', 48'; Dzsudzsák 51'; T. Sándor (yellow card) 60'; Sidibe 90'	Report	Laskai (yellow card) 45'	Stadium: Oláh Gábor utcai Stadion; Attendance: 6,000; Referee: Ferenc Bede; Assistant referees: Tamás Márkus, Gyula Ortó; Fourth official: Péter Herbály

15 September 2006 6	Debrecen	2–1	Honvéd	Debrecen
19:00 CEST (UTC+2)	Brnović (yellow card) 19', (goal) 24'; T. Sándor 26'; Madar (yellow card) 83'; Bernáth (yellow card) 90'	Report	Genito (yellow card) 10'; Csobánki (yellow card) 20'; Debreceni (red card) 37'; Dobos 74'	Stadium: Oláh Gábor utcai Stadion; Attendance: 7,000; Referee: Mihály Fábián; Assistant referees: István Albert, Dr. Zsolt Varga; Fourth official: Attila Hegedűs

23 September 2006 7	Tatabánya	2–1	Debrecen	Tatabánya
15:00 CEST (UTC+2)	Ndjodo 24'; Jezdimirović (yellow card) 40'; Megyesi 68'; Kouemaha (yellow card) 90+4'	Report	Komlósi (yellow card) 67'; T. Sándor 70'	Stadium: Városi Stadion; Attendance: 2,800; Referee: Sándor Gergely; Assistant referees: Zoltán Szalai, Szabolcs Deutsch; Fourth official: Miklós Dmeter

30 September 2006 8	Debrecen	3–1	Fehérvár	Debrecen
18:00 CEST (UTC+2)	Sidibe 16', 51', 90'; T. Sándor (yellow card) 85' (yellow-red card) 87'; Komlósi (yellow card) 90'; Bernáth (yellow card) 90+2'	Report	Györök (yellow card) 28'; Sitku 61'; Terjék (yellow card) 86'; Kuttor (yellow card) 86'	Stadium: Oláh Gábor utcai Stadion; Attendance: 7,000; Referee: István Vad; Assistant referees: Attila Kelemen, Tibor Vígh; Fourth official: László Varga

14 October 2006 9	MTK	1–0	Debrecen	Budapest
15:00 CEST (UTC+2)	Kanta 68' (pen.)	Report	Szatmári (yellow card) 10'; Dzsudzsák (yellow card) 54'; Brnović (yellow card) 77'	Stadium: Hidegkuti Nándor Stadion; Attendance: 2,400; Referee: Péter Solymosi; Assistant referees: Ferenc Székely, Gábor Takács; Fourth official: Bence Gaál

20 October 2006 10	Debrecen	1–1	Diósgyőr	Debrecen
19:00 CEST (UTC+2)	T. Sándor 26'	Report	Mogyorósi (yellow card) 66'; Abdou (yellow card) 77'; A. Simon 81'	Stadium: Oláh Gábor utcai Stadion; Attendance: 8,500; Referee: Zoltán Iványi; Assistant referees: István Albert, Jozsef Heibl; Fourth official: Gábor Bendik

28 October 2006 11	Győr	0–0	Debrecen	Győr (Note: The match was played at the Nádorvárosi Stadion in Győr, instead of Győr regular stadium, the Stadion ETO in Győr, which was demolished to make way to the newly built ETO Park.)
15:00 CEST (UTC+2)	Z. Kovács II (yellow card) 62'	Report		Stadium: Nádorvárosi Stadion; Attendance: 2,500; Referee: Ferenc Bede; Assistant referees: Zoltán Szalai, Zoltán Kovács; Fourth official: Norbert Kiss

6 November 2006 12	Debrecen	0–2	Újpest	Debrecen
18:00 CET (UTC+1)	T. Sándor (yellow card) 7'	Report	Erős (yellow card) 13'; G. Sándor 46'; Rajczi 61', (yellow card) 65'; Korcsmár (yellow card) 70'	Stadium: Oláh Gábor utcai Stadion; Attendance: 8,000; Referee: Mihály Fábián; Assistant referees: Zoltán Tompos, Vencel Tóth II; Fourth official: Péter Herbály

11 November 2006 13	Rákospalota	1–3	Debrecen	Budapest
13:30 CET (UTC+1)	Pusztai 58'	Report	Dombi 49'; Zsolnai 65', 76'	Stadium: Budai II. László Stadion; Attendance: 1,000; Referee: Tamás Arany; Assistant referees: Z. Szpisják, Á. Vári

18 November 2006 14	Debrecen	3–1	Zalaegerszeg	Debrecen
15:00 CET (UTC+1)	Zsolnai 11', 13'; Sidibe 86'	Report	Józsi 26'	Stadium: Oláh Gábor utcai Stadion; Attendance: 7,500; Referee: Sándor Andó-Szabó; Assistant referees: István Albert, János Medovarszki; Fourth official: János Takács

25 November 2006 15	Sopron	1–6	Debrecen	Sopron
16:00 CET (UTC+1)	Birtalan 6'; Feczesin (yellow card) 42'; Demjén (yellow card) 49'; Radu (yellow card) 63'; Munteanu (yellow card) 67'	Report	Z. Kiss 17', (yellow card) 43'; Halmosi 23'; Szatmári (yellow card) 40'; Leandro 68'; Sidibe 75', 89'; Zsolnai 84'	Stadium: Káposztás utcai Stadion; Attendance: 1,500; Referee: Zsolt Szabó; Assistant referees: Róbert Kispál, Balázs Huszár; Fourth official: Gábor Oláh

2 December 2006 16	Pécs	0–2	Debrecen	Pécs
15:00 CET (UTC+1)	Pavičević (yellow card) 31'; Kulcsár (yellow card) 42'; Bajúsz (yellow card) 90'	Report	Leandro 21'; T. Sándor (yellow card) 71'; B. Virág (yellow card) 76'; Sidibe 90+2'	Stadium: Stadion PMFC; Attendance: 1,300; Referee: Zoltán Iványi; Assistant referees: János Medovarszki, Jozsef Heibl; Fourth official: Zsolt Kovács

10 December 2006 17	Debrecen	1–0	Paks	Debrecen
15:00 CET (UTC+1)	Vukmir (yellow card) 8'; Leandro 85', (yellow card) 88'	Report	Tamási (yellow card) 11'; Tóth (yellow card) 63'; Buzás (yellow card) 90'; T. Kiss (yellow card) 90+2'	Stadium: Oláh Gábor utcai Stadion; Attendance: 7,000; Referee: Tamás Arany; Assistant referees: Tibor Vígh, László Viszokai; Fourth official: János Takács

23 February 2007 18	Vasas	0–1	Debrecen	Budapest
19:00 CET (UTC+1)	Unierzyski (yellow card) 24'; Piller (yellow card) 52'; Lázok (yellow card) 66'; Pintér (yellow card) 80'	Report	Sidibe (yellow card) 27'; Dzsudzsák (yellow card) 64'; Tchana 86'	Stadium: Illovszky Rudolf Stadion; Attendance: 1,500; Referee: Sándor Andó-Szabó; Assistant referees: Zsolt Szpisják, Vencel Tóth II; Fourth official: Péter Pető

5 March 2007 19	Debrecen	1–0	Kaposvár	Debrecen
18:00 CET (UTC+1)	Leandro (yellow card) 58'; Sidibe 71'; Z. Kiss (yellow card) 76'; Dzsudzsák (yellow card) 90'	Report	Oláh (yellow card) 20'; Božović (yellow card) 29'	Stadium: Oláh Gábor utcai Stadion; Attendance: 7,000; Referee: Mihály Fábián; Assistant referees: Gyula Ortó, Dr. Zsolt Varga; Fourth official: János Takács

10 March 2007 20	Vác	1–3	Debrecen	Vác
16:00 CET (UTC+1)	Kulcsár (yellow card) 26'; Makrai (yellow card) 75'; Palásthy 84'	Report	Sidibe 9', 45'; Stojkov 60'	Stadium: Ligeti Stadion; Attendance: 2,000; Referee: József Berger; Assistant referees: Zoltán Kis, Attila Beidek; Fourth official: József Erdős

16 March 2007 21	Honvéd	2–1	Debrecen	Budapest
19:00 CET (UTC+1)	Smiljanić (yellow card) 15' (yellow-red card) 75'; Hercegfalvi 54'; Ndjodo 59'; Tomić (yellow card) 88'	Report	Bernáth (yellow card) 52'; Vukmir (yellow card) 56'; Sidibe 75'; T. Sándor (yellow card) 84'; Komlósi (red card) 90+2'	Stadium: Bozsik József Stadion; Attendance: 4,500; Referee: Péter Solymosi; Assistant referees: Róbert Kispál, Zsolt Butkai; Fourth official: Péter Herbály

30 March 2007 22	Debrecen	2–0	Tatabánya	Debrecen
19:00 CEST (UTC+2)	Sidibe 23', 50'; Bíró (yellow card) 55'; Zsolnai (yellow card) 88'	Report	Kichi (yellow card) 66'	Stadium: Oláh Gábor utcai Stadion; Attendance: 5,000; Referee: Richard Havrilla (Slovakia); Assistant referees: Rusbarski (Slovakia), Laskovsky (Slovakia); Fourth official: Mihály Fábián

6 April 2007 23	Fehérvár	0–4	Debrecen	Székesfehérvár
19:00 CEST (UTC+2)		Report	Leandro 28', (yellow card) 40'; Lattenstein 35' (o.g.); Dzsudzsák 56', 70'; Bernáth (yellow card) 64'	Stadium: Sóstói Stadion; Attendance: 1,652; Referee: Ferenc Bede; Assistant referees: Gábor Erős, Zoltán Kovács; Fourth official: András Sóthy

14 April 2007 24	Debrecen	3–0	MTK	Debrecen
15:00 CEST (UTC+2)	Komlósi 41'; Stojkov 50'; Sidibe 65'	Report	Pintér (yellow card) 37'; Á. Szabó (yellow card) 47'; Lipcsei (yellow card) 58'; Pál (yellow card) 90+2'	Stadium: Oláh Gábor utcai Stadion; Attendance: 10,500; Referee: Péter Solymosi; Assistant referees: Imre Attila Nagy, István Tóth; Fourth official: Gábor Bendik

20 April 2007 25	Diósgyőr	1–5	Debrecen	Miskolc
19:00 CEST (UTC+2)	A. Simon 56'; Huszák (yellow card) 66'	Report	Dzsudzsák 8', 62'; Leandro (yellow card) 26', (goal) 29'; Mészáros 38'; Sidibe 70'	Stadium: Diósgyőri Stadion; Attendance: 4,000; Referee: Sándor Andó-Szabó; Assistant referees: Zoltán Szalai, Zsolt Butkai; Fourth official: Attila Hegedűs

28 April 2007 26	Debrecen	3–0	Győr	Debrecen
18:00 CEST (UTC+2)	Stojkov 66' (pen.), 75', (yellow card) 66'; Komlósi 73'	Report	Pákolicz (yellow card) 59'; R. Varga (yellow card) 66'; Rozsi (yellow card) 77'	Stadium: Oláh Gábor utcai Stadion; Attendance: 8,000; Referee: Alexandru Deaconu (Romania); Assistant referees: Nicolae Maradin (Romania), Octavian Lovre (Romania); Fourth official: János Takács

4 May 2007 27	Újpest	2–0	Debrecen	Budapest
19:00 CEST (UTC+2)	G. Sándor 1', (yellow card) 55'; Vaskó (yellow card) 48'; Kovács 53', (yellow card) 53'; Habi (yellow card) 62'; Füzi (yellow card) 88'	Report	Komlósi (yellow card) 14' (yellow-red card) 73'; Sidibe (yellow card) 29'; Z. Kiss (yellow card) 72'; Bernáth (yellow card) 79'	Stadium: Szusza Ferenc Stadion; Attendance: 3,421; Referee: Mihály Fábián; Assistant referees: Dr. Zsolt Varga, Zoltán Pápai; Fourth official: Róbert Nagy

14 May 2007 28	Debrecen	4–1	Rákospalota	Debrecen
18:00 CEST (UTC+2)	Szilágyi 7'; Dombi (yellow card) 21'; Leandro 28', 72'; Dzsudzsák (yellow card) 81', (goal) 82'	Report	Cseri (yellow card) 10'; Polonkai (yellow card) 32'; Nyerges 55'	Stadium: Oláh Gábor utcai Stadion; Attendance: 10,000; Referee: József Berger; Assistant referees: Dr. Zsolt Varga, Zoltán Pápai; Fourth official: Róbert Nagy

18 May 2007 29	Zalaegerszeg	0–1	Debrecen	Zalaegerszeg
19:00 CEST (UTC+2)	Csóka (yellow card) 63'; Z. Varga I (yellow card) 80'	Report	Leandro 51'; Vukmir (yellow card) 54'; Stojkov (yellow card) 80'	Stadium: ZTE Arena; Attendance: 4,500; Referee: Zsolt Szabó; Assistant referees: Róber Kispál, Vencel Tóth II; Fourth official: Ádám Németh

26 May 2007 30	Debrecen	2–1	Sopron	Debrecen
17:00 CEST (UTC+2)	Dzsudzsák 25'; T. Sándor 71'; Vukmir (yellow card) 90'	Report	Cigan 37'	Stadium: Oláh Gábor utcai Stadion; Attendance: 10,500; Referee: Zoltán Iványi; Assistant referees: István Albert, Zsolt Szpisják; Fourth official: János Takács

=== Magyar Kupa ===
25 October 2006 Round of 32	Nyíregyháza	0–2	Debrecen	Nyíregyháza
13:30 CEST (UTC+2)	Minczér (yellow card) 70'; Vass (yellow card) 88'	Report	Vukmir (yellow card) 52'; B. Virág 58'; Leandro (yellow card) 59'; Dzsudzsák 80', (yellow card) 88'	Stadium: Városi Stadion; Attendance: 3,500; Referee: József Erdős; Assistant referees: Kelemen, G. Fehér

==== Round of 16 ====
1 November 2006 First leg	Dunaújváros	0–1	Debrecen	Dunaújváros
13:30 CET (UTC+1)		Report	Sidibe (yellow card) 18'; Balogh (yellow card) 22'; Halmosi 55'	Stadium: Eszperantó úti Stadion; Attendance: 2,000; Referee: Sándor Gergely; Assistant referees: Deutsch, Z. Szalai

22 November 2006 Second leg	Debrecen	3–0 (4–0 agg.)	Dunaújváros	Debrecen
16:30 CET (UTC+1)	Pérez 22' (o.g.); Z. Kiss (yellow card) 50'; Zsolnai 53', 64'; Leandro (yellow card) 62'; Halmosi (yellow card) 90'	Report		Stadium: Oláh Gábor utcai Stadion; Attendance: 6,000; Referee: József Berger; Assistant referees: Heibl, I. Tóth
Note: Debrecen won 4–0 on aggregate.

==== Quarter-finals ====
21 March 2007 Second leg	Újpest	0–0	Debrecen	Budapest
18:00 CET (UTC+1)		Report		Stadium: Szusza Ferenc Stadion; Attendance: 2,500; Referee: Sándor Gergely; Assistant referees: Balázs Farkas, Szabolcs Deutsch

3 April 2007 First leg	Debrecen	3–1 (3–1 agg.)	Újpest	Debrecen
18:00 CEST (UTC+2)	Z. Kiss 13'; Bernáth (yellow card) 15'; Zsolnai 67'; Dzsudzsák 81'; Komlósi (yellow card) 83'; Vukmir (yellow card) 90+2'	Report	Zaleh (yellow card) 21' (yellow-red card) 59'; Tisza 36'; Vaskó (yellow card) 45'; Erős (yellow card) 90'	Stadium: Oláh Gábor utcai Stadion; Attendance: 8,000; Referee: Zsolt Szabó; Assistant referees: Róbert Kispál, Zoltán Tompos
Note: Debrecen won 3–1 on aggregate.

==== Semi-finals ====
17 April 2007 First leg	Diósgyőr	0–1	Debrecen	Miskolc
18:00 CEST (UTC+2)	Rubint (yellow card) 34'	Report	Takács (yellow card) 26'; Sidibe (yellow card) 57', (goal) 85'	Stadium: Diósgyőri Stadion; Attendance: 6,000; Referee: Sándor Gergely; Assistant referees: Róbert Kispál, Balázs Farkas; Fourth official: Tibor Gyarmati II

25 April 2007 Second leg	Debrecen	2–2 (3–2 agg.)	Diósgyőr	Debrecen
18:00 CEST (UTC+2)	Stojkov 17'; Komlósi (yellow card) 53', (goal) 79'	Report	Katona (yellow card) 42'; Kéthévoama 59'; Farkas 89'	Stadium: Oláh Gábor utcai Stadion; Attendance: 7,000; Referee: Zoltán Iványi; Assistant referees: Zsolt Szpisják, István Albert; Fourth official: János Takács
Note: Debrecen won 3–2 on aggregate.

==== Final ====
9 May 2007 Final	Debrecen	2–2 (a.e.t.) (1–3 p)	Honvéd	Budapest
18:30 CEST (UTC+2)	Vukmir (yellow card) 35'; Zsolnai 70'; Bíró (yellow card) 77' (yellow-red card) 113'; Sidibe 97' (pen.), (yellow card) 119'; Komlósi (yellow card) 111'	Report	Angoua (yellow card) 20'; Ivancsics 28', (yellow card) 59'; T. Szabó (yellow card) 29', (goal) 105' (pen.); Pomper (yellow card) 63' (yellow-red card) 97'	Stadium: Szusza Ferenc Stadion; Attendance: 6,880; Referee: Ferenc Bede; Assistant referees: Zoltán Tompos, Zoltán Szalai; Fourth official: Péter Solymosi
	Penalties
	Komlósi (penalty missed); Sidibe (penalty scored); Z. Kiss (penalty missed); Zsolnai (penalty missed)		(penalty scored) Ivancsics; (penalty scored) Genito; (penalty missed) Ndjodo; (penalty scored) T. Szabó
Note: Honvéd won 3–1 on penalties.

=== UEFA Champions League ===
==== Qualifying rounds ====
===== Second qualifying round =====
26 July 2006 First leg	Debrecen (Hungary)	1–1	(North Macedonia) Rabotnicki	Debrecen, Hungary
20:45 CEST (UTC+2)	Máté (yellow card) 15'; Zsolnai (yellow card) 39', (goal) 45+2'	Report	Jeremić (yellow card) 22'; Stankovski (yellow card) 37', (goal) 45'; M. Stepanovski (yellow card) 52'; Pachovski (yellow card) 71'	Stadium: Oláh Gábor utcai Stadion; Attendance: 6,124; Referee: Oleh Oriekhov (Ukraine); Assistant referees: Sergiy Tsymbal (Ukraine), Vasyl Olshanetskyy (Ukraine); Fourth official: Vitaliy Godulyan (Ukraine)

2 August 2006 Second leg	Rabotnicki (North Macedonia)	4–1 (5–2 agg.)	(Hungary) Debrecen	Skopje, Macedonia
20:00 CEST (UTC+2)	Nexhipi 21'; Jeremić (yellow card) 28'; Pejčić 35'; Trajčev 42'; Neno 56'	Report	Bernáth (yellow card) 18'; Sidibe 20', (red card) 50'; Halmosi (yellow card) 23' (yellow-red card) 43'; Dzsudzsák (yellow card) 45'; Éger (yellow card) 50'	Stadium: Philip II Arena; Attendance: 5,500; Referee: Damir Skomina (Slovenia); Assistant referees: Andrej Kokolj (Slovenia), Milan Kogej (Slovenia); Fourth official: Boris Toseski (Slovenia)
Note: Rabotnicki won 5–2 on aggregate.

== Statistics ==
=== Overall ===
Appearances (Apps) numbers are for appearances in competitive games only, including sub appearances.
Source: Competitions

No.	Player	Pos.	Nemzeti Bajnokság I				Magyar Kupa				Szuperkupa				UEFA Champions League				Total			
No.	Player	Pos.	Apps	Goal	Booked	Sent off (straight red)	Apps	Goal	Booked	Sent off (straight red)	Apps	Goal	Booked	Sent off (straight red)	Apps	Goal	Booked	Sent off (straight red)	Apps	Goal	Booked	Sent off (straight red)
1	(Croatia) Sandro Tomić	GK	3				2												5			
2	(Hungary) Péter Máté	DF									1		1		1		1		2		2	
2	(Hungary) István Szűcs	DF	2																2			
3	(Hungary) Csaba Szatmári	DF	11		3		2				2		1		2				17		4	
4	(Hungary) Leandro	MF	26	8	4		8		2										34	8	6	
5	(Serbia) Dragan Vukmir	DF	24		5		7		3		2				2				35		8	
6	(Hungary) Zoltán Takács	DF	6				2		1										8		1	
6	(Hungary) Béla Virág	MF	12	1	2		3	1			1				1				17	2	2	
7	(Hungary) Tibor Dombi	MF	22	1	1		6				2		1		2				32	1	2	
8	(Hungary) Csaba Madar	MF	6		1		2				1								9		1	
8	(North Macedonia) Aco Stojkov	FW	10	4	2		2	1											12	5	2	
9	(Hungary) Tamás Sándor	MF	22	4	6	1	4				2				2				30	4	6	1
10	(Serbia) Igor Bogdanović	FW	11	1			3				2	1			2				17	2		
11	(Montenegro) Bojan Brnović	FW	10	3	2		3				2				1				16	3	2	
11	(Brazil) Marco Túlio	MF	5				2												7			
12	(Hungary) János Balogh	GK	10				1												11			
13	(Hungary) Zoltán Balogh	MF	2		1		1		1		1								4		2	
13	(Hungary) Péter Bíró	DF	4		1		2		3	1									6		4	1
14	(Hungary) Gyula Hegedűs	DF	1		1														1		1	
14	(France) Jimmy Jones Tchana	FW	5	1			2												7	1		
15	(Hungary) Aladár Virág	DF																				
16	(Hungary) Ádám Komlósi	DF	23	2	5	2	7	1	3						1				31	3	8	2
17	(Hungary) Norbert Mészáros	FW	21	1			7												28	1		
18	(Hungary) Róbert Zsolnai	FW	23	5	1		8	4			2				1	1	1		34	10	2	
19	(Hungary) Balázs Dzsudzsák	MF	23	7	4		6	2	1		2	1			2		1		33	10	6	
21	(Gabon) Thierry Issiémou	MF	3				2												5			
22	(Hungary) Csaba Bernáth	DF	24		6		7		1		2		2	1	2		1		35		10	1
23	(Hungary) László Rezes	MF	5																5			
23	(Hungary) Péter Szilágyi	FW	3	1															3	1		
24	(Hungary) Norbert Csernyánszki	GK	17				5				2				2				26			
26	(Senegal) Ibrahima Sidibe	FW	27	17	3		7	2	3						2	1		1	36	20	6	1
28	(Hungary) Péter Halmosi	MF	16	2			3	1	1		2		1		2		2	1	23	3	4	1
28	(Hungary) Zoltán Nagy	DF																				
29	(Hungary) István Spitzmüller	MF																				
30	(Hungary) Zoltán Kiss	MF	26	3	3		7	1	1						1				34	4	4	
31	(Hungary) Zsolt Hamar	GK																				
73	(Hungary) László Éger	DF	2	1	1						2		2		2		1		6	1	4	
81	(Hungary) Zoltán Böőr	MF	2																2			
Own goals				1				1				1								3		
Totals				63	52	3		14	20	1		3	8	1		2	7	2		82	87	7

=== Hat-tricks ===
No.	Player	Against	Result	Date	Competition
26	(Senegal) Ibrahima Sidibe	Fehérvár (H)	3–1	30 September 2006	Nemzeti Bajnokság I

=== Clean sheets ===
			Clean sheets				
No.	Player	Games Played	Nemzeti Bajnokság I	Magyar Kupa	Szuperkupa	UEFA Champions League	Total
24	(Hungary) Norbert Csernyánszki	26	6	3	1		10
12	(Hungary) János Balogh	11	6	1			7
1	(Croatia) Sandro Tomić	5	1	2			3
31	(Hungary) Zsolt Hamar						
Totals			13	6	1		20
