= 2005–06 Debreceni VSC season =

Debrecen
2005–06 season
- Manager: Attila Supka
- Stadium: Oláh Gábor utcai Stadion
- Nemzeti Bajnokság I: 1st
- Magyar Kupa: Semi-finals
- Szuperkupa: Winners
- UEFA Champions League: Third qualifying round
- UEFA Cup: First round
- Top goalscorer: League: Ibrahima Sidibe (15); All: Ibrahima Sidibe (20)
- Highest home attendance: 25,000 v Manchester United (24 August 2005, UEFA Champions League)
- Lowest home attendance: 3,500 v Rákospalota (14 April 2006, Nemzeti Bajnokság I)
- Average home league attendance: 7,600
- Biggest win: 5–0 v Hajduk Split (Away, 3 August 2005, UEFA Champions League); 6–1 v Honvéd (Home, 3 December 2005, Nemzeti Bajnokság I); 6–1 v Rákospalota (Home, 14 April 2006, Nemzeti Bajnokság I)
- Biggest defeat: 0–3 v Manchester United (Away, 9 August 2005, UEFA Champions League); 0–3 v Manchester United (Home, 24 August 2005, UEFA Champions League); 1–4 v Shakhtar Donetsk (Away, 15 September 2005, UEFA Cup)

The 2005–06 season was Debreceni Vasutas Sport Club's 32nd competitive season, 13th consecutive season in the Nemzeti Bajnokság I and 93rd season in existence as a football club. In addition to the domestic league, Debrecen participated in that season's editions of the Magyar Kupa, the Szuperkupa, the UEFA Champions League and the UEFA Cup.

== Squad ==
Squad at end of season

Note: Flags indicate national team as defined under FIFA eligibility rules; some limited exceptions apply. Players may hold more than one non-FIFA nationality.

No.	Pos.	Nation	Player
1	GK	CRO	Sandro Tomić
2	DF	HUN	Péter Máté
3	DF	HUN	Csaba Szatmári
5	DF	SCG	Dragan Vukmir
6	MF	HUN	Béla Virág
7	MF	HUN	Tibor Dombi
8	MF	HUN	Csaba Madar
9	MF	HUN	Tamás Sándor
10	FW	SCG	Igor Bogdanović
11	FW	SCG	Bojan Brnović
12	GK	HUN	János Balogh
16	DF	HUN	Ádám Komlósi

No.	Pos.	Nation	Player
17	FW	HUN	Norbert Mészáros
19	MF	HUN	Balázs Dzsudzsák
20	DF	HUN	Aladár Virág
21	MF	CRO	Ronald Habi
22	DF	HUN	Csaba Bernáth
24	GK	HUN	Norbert Csernyánszki
26	FW	SEN	Ibrahima Sidibe
28	MF	HUN	Péter Halmosi
30	MF	HUN	Zoltán Kiss
31	FW	HUN	István Ferenczi
73	DF	HUN	László Éger
81	MF	HUN	Zoltán Böőr

== Transfers ==
=== Transfers in ===
Transfer window	Pos.	No.	Player	From
Summer	DF	2	(Hungary) Péter Máté	Diósgyőr
Summer	DF	5	(Serbia and Montenegro) Dragan Vukmir	Ferencváros
Summer	FW	11	(Serbia and Montenegro) Bojan Brnović	(Serbia and Montenegro) Partizan
Summer	FW	17	(Hungary) Norbert Mészáros	(Germany) Energie Cottbus
Summer	MF	20	(Hungary) Gergő Jeremiás	Létavértes
Summer	DF	23	(Slovakia) Otto Szabó	Sopron
Summer	FW	26	(Senegal) Ibrahima Sidibe	(Austria) Ried
Autumn	FW	10	(North Macedonia) Georgi Hristov	(Scotland) Dunfermline Athletic
Autumn	FW	13	(Brazil) Franciel	(Switzerland) Schaffhausen
Autumn	FW	31	(Hungary) István Ferenczi	(Turkey) Rizespor
Winter	GK	12	(Hungary) János Balogh	Sopron

=== Transfers out ===
Transfer window	Pos.	No.	Player	To
Summer	N/A	–	(Hungary) Roland Czifrák	Balkány
Summer	GK	–	(Hungary) Viktor Dobó	Hajdúböszörmény
Summer	FW	–	(Serbia and Montenegro) Miloš Kolaković	Released
Summer	DF	–	(Hungary) András László	Zalaegerszeg
Summer	DF	–	(Hungary) Kálmán Milbik	Szakoly
Summer	MF	–	(Hungary) Zoltán Saliga	Létavértes
Summer	FW	–	(Hungary) Illés Zsolt Sitku	Fehérvár
Autumn	GK	–	(Hungary) Dávid Vadon	(England) Manchester City
Autumn	FW	18	(Hungary) Zsombor Kerekes	(Netherlands) Willem II
Winter	FW	–	(Hungary) Péter Szilágyi	Létavértes
Winter	FW	10	(North Macedonia) Georgi Hristov	Released
Winter	FW	13	(Brazil) Franciel	(Greece) Olympiacos Volos
Winter	DF	23	(Slovakia) Otto Szabó	Vasas
Spring	MF	25	(Hungary) Balázs Nikolov	(Norway) Hamarkameratene

=== Loans in ===
Transfer window	Pos.	No.	Player	From	End date

=== Loans out ===
Transfer window	Pos.	No.	Player	To	End date
Autumn	FW	10	(Serbia and Montenegro) Igor Bogdanović	(Turkey) Gençlerbirliği	Middle of season
Autumn	MF	81	(Hungary) Zoltán Böőr	(Turkey) Manisaspor	Middle of season
Autumn	DF	20	(Hungary) Aladár Virág	Nyíregyháza	End of season
Winter	GK	12	(Hungary) Gábor Máthé	Létavértes	End of season
Winter	DF	14	(Hungary) Gyula Hegedűs	Vasas	End of season
Winter	MF	20	(Hungary) Gergő Jeremiás	Diósgyőr	End of season

== Competitions ==
=== Overview ===
Competition	First match	Last match	Starting round	Final position	Record							
Competition	First match	Last match	Starting round	Final position	Pld	W	D	L	GF	GA	GD	Win %
Nemzeti Bajnokság I	30 July 2005	3 June 2006	Matchday 1	Winners	30	20	8	2	69	34	+35	66.67
Magyar Kupa	26 October 2005	3 May 2006	Round of 16	Semi-finals	6	4	1	1	9	4	+5	66.67
Szuperkupa	16 July 2005	20 July 2005	Final	Winners	2	1	0	1	5	4	+1	50.00
UEFA Champions League	27 July 2005	24 August 2005	Second qualifying round	Third qualifying round	4	2	0	2	8	6	+2	50.00
UEFA Cup	5 September 2005	29 September 2005	First round	First round	2	0	0	2	1	6	−5	0.00
Total					44	27	9	8	92	54	+38	61.36

Source: Competitions

=== Szuperkupa ===
Debrecen, as Nemzeti Bajnokság I winners in the previous season, played against Sopron in the 2005 Szuperkupa, who themselves won the Magyar Kupa.

16 July 2005 First leg	Sopron	4–2	Debrecen	Sopron
20:00 CEST (UTC+2)	Costișor (yellow card) 21'; Coțan 29', 34'; Lazić 66' (pen.); A. Horváth 77'	Report	Habi (yellow card) 6'; Z. Kiss I (yellow card) 32', (goal) 72'; T. Sándor 85'	Stadium: Káposztás utcai Stadion; Attendance: 2,600; Referee: József Erdős; Assistant referees: Kispál, G. Takács

20 July 2005 Second leg	Debrecen	3–0 (5–4 agg.)	Sopron	Debrecen
20:00 CEST (UTC+2)	Nikolov (yellow card) 22'; Kerekes 31'; T. Sándor 34'; P. Máté II (yellow card) 37', (goal) 55'; Habi (yellow card) 44'	Report	A. Horváth (yellow card) 40'; Ibric (yellow card) 64'; Fehér (yellow card) 86'	Stadium: Oláh Gábor utcai Stadion; Attendance: 5,500; Referee: Ferenc Bede; Assistant referees: Tompos, Ortó
Note: Debrecen won 5–4 on aggregate.

=== Nemzeti Bajnokság I ===
==== League table ====
Pos	Team	Pld	W	D	L	GF	GA	GD	Pts	Qualification or relegation
1	Debrecen (C)	30	20	8	2	69	34	+35	68	Qualification for Champions League second qualifying round
2	Újpest	30	20	5	5	74	37	+37	65	Qualification for UEFA Cup first qualifying round (Note: Videoton FC Fehérvár won the 2005–06 Hungarian Cup and thereby qualified for the first qualifying round of the UEFA Cup.)
3	Fehérvár	30	19	7	4	52	24	+28	64	Qualification for UEFA Cup first qualifying round
4	MTK	30	18	6	6	65	33	+32	60	
5	Tatabánya	30	11	8	11	46	45	+1	41	

Source: RSSSF
(C) Champions

==== Results summary ====
Overall								Home						Away					
Pld	W	D	L	GF	GA	GD	Pts	W	D	L	GF	GA	GD	W	D	L	GF	GA	GD
30	20	8	2	69	34	+35	68	11	4	0	41	15	+26	9	4	2	28	19	+9

Source: Hungarian Football Federation

==== Results by round ====
Round	1	2	3	4	5	6	7	8	9	10	11	12	13	14	15	16	17	18	19	20	21	22	23	24	25	26	27	28	29	30
Ground	H	A	H	A	H	H	H	A	H	H	A	H	A	H	A	A	H	A	H	A	A	A	H	A	A	H	A	H	A	H
Result	W	W	D	W	D	W	D	W	W	W	D	W	D	W	D	L	W	W	D	L	D	W	W	W	W	W	W	W	W	W
Position	1	2	2	3	4	4	4	4	3	3	2	2	3	3	3	4	3	2	3	4	4	3	3	3	2	2	2	2	2	1
Points	3	6	7	10	11	14	15	18	21	24	25	28	29	32	33	33	36	39	40	40	41	44	47	50	53	56	59	62	65	68

Source: Hungarian Football Federation
A = Away; H = Home; W = Win; D = Draw; L = Loss

==== Matches ====
30 July 2005 1	Debrecen	2–1	Zalaegerszeg	Debrecen
19:00 CEST (UTC+2)	Sidibe 5'; Vukmir (yellow card) 72'; Bogdanović 76'	Report	Kriston (yellow card) 61'; V. Sebők (yellow card) 69'; Montvai 78'; Kocsárdi (yellow card) 81'	Stadium: Oláh Gábor utcai Stadion; Attendance: 7,500; Referee: Szabolcs Saskőy; Assistant referees: Székely, Heibl

20 August 2005 3	Debrecen	2–2	MTK	Debrecen
19:00 CEST (UTC+2)	Bogdanović 13'; Nikolov (yellow card) 43'; T. Sándor 59'; Bernáth (yellow card) 88'	Report	Jezdimirović (yellow card) 44'; Kanta 51'; B. Balogh (yellow card) 77'; Bonifert 79'	Stadium: Oláh Gábor utcai Stadion; Attendance: 9,000; Referee: Viktor Kassai

28 August 2005 4	Győr	1–2	Debrecen	Győr
11:30 CEST (UTC+2)	Lendvai (yellow card) 6'; Sidibe 17' (o.g.); P. Tóth (yellow card) 67'; O. Vincze (yellow card) 76'; Makra (yellow card) 76'	Report	Komlósi (yellow card) 26'; Szatmári (yellow card) 27'; Z. Kiss I (yellow card) 38'; Bogdanović 52'; Brnović 59'	Stadium: Stadion ETO; Attendance: 2,000; Referee: Zsolt Szabó; Assistant referees: P. Hegyi, Z. Tompos

19 September 2005 5	Debrecen	2–2	Újpest	Debrecen
19:00 CEST (UTC+2)	P. Máté II 5'; Dombi (yellow card) 37'; Halmosi (red card) 53'; Z. Kiss I (yellow card) 64'; Brnović 66'	Report	Z. Kovács I 39'; N. Tóth (yellow card) 62', (goal) 78' (pen.); B. Tóth (yellow card) 84'	Stadium: Oláh Gábor utcai Stadion; Attendance: 8,000; Referee: Ferenc Bede; Assistant referees: T. Vámos, Tompos

24 September 2005 6	Debrecen	2–0	Diósgyőr	Debrecen
19:00 CEST (UTC+2)	B. Virág 16'; Dzsudzsák (yellow card) 62'; Éger (yellow card) 81'; Z. Kiss I 89'	Report	Tisza (yellow card) 13'; Vitelki (yellow card) 34'; Mogyoródi (yellow card) 79'; V. Farkas (yellow card) 82'	Stadium: Oláh Gábor utcai Stadion; Attendance: 8,500; Referee: János Megyebíró; Assistant referees: P. Tóth, I. Albert

3 October 2005 7	Debrecen	2–2	Vasas	Debrecen
18:15 CEST (UTC+2)	Sidibe 12'; P. Máté II (yellow card) 22'; Brnović 52'	Report	Janjić 38'; Rósa (yellow card) 51'; Elek (yellow card) 60'; Füzi (yellow card) 85'; Salamon (yellow card) 89'; Gyánó 90+1'; Waltner (yellow card) 90+3'	Stadium: Oláh Gábor utcai Stadion; Attendance: 6,500; Referee: Mihály Fábián; Assistant referees: Ortó, Márkus

15 October 2005 8	Rákospalota	1–2	Debrecen	Budapest
15:00 CEST (UTC+2)	G. Nagy I (yellow card) 25'; Virágh (yellow card) 45'; Nyerges 68'; T. Németh (yellow card) 75'	Report	P. Máté II (yellow card) 26', (goal) 32'; T. Sándor 62', (yellow card) 70'	Stadium: Budai II. László Stadion; Attendance: 1,500; Referee: Zoltán Szarka; Assistant referees: P. Szabó, Z. Kovács

19 October 2005 2	Kaposvár	1–2	Debrecen	Kaposvár
18:00 CEST (UTC+2)	Zsolnai 25'; Andruskó (yellow card) 62'; Kovácsevics (yellow card) 84'	Report	Z. Kiss I (yellow card) 27'; A. Pintér 28' (o.g.); Sidibe 30', (yellow card) 84'; B. Virág (yellow card) 79' (yellow-red card) 90+2'	Stadium: Rákóczi Stadion; Attendance: 2,200; Referee: Péter Solymosi; Assistant referees: G. Takács, L. Varga II
Note: The match was postponed due to Debrecen's participation in European competition.

23 October 2005 9	Debrecen	3–1	Pécs	Debrecen
17:00 CEST (UTC+2)	Sidibe 8'; Brnović 30'; Ferenczi 90'	Report	Pavičević (yellow card) 24'; Szögedi 90+1'	Stadium: Oláh Gábor utcai Stadion; Attendance: 7,000; Referee: István Vad; Assistant referees: Z. Szalai, T. Vígh

30 October 2005 10	Debrecen	2–0	Fehérvár	Debrecen
11:30 CET (UTC+1)	Brnović 41'; Szatmári (yellow card) 42'; Halmosi 45'; Ferenczi (yellow card) 78'; Éger (penalty missed) 90+2'	Report	B. Farkas (yellow card) 33' (yellow-red card) 57'; Sitku (yellow card) 90+1'	Stadium: Oláh Gábor utcai Stadion; Attendance: 8,000; Referee: János Megyebíró; Assistant referees: Szpisják, P. Tóth

6 November 2005 11	Tatabánya	3–3	Debrecen	Tatabánya
13:30 CET (UTC+1)	Filó (yellow card) 11'; T. Nagy 54'; Márkus 59', 84' (pen.); Vati (yellow card) 67'	Report	Z. Kiss I (yellow card) 13', (goal) 80'; Halmosi 50', (yellow card) 84'; Madar (yellow card) 64'; Ferenczi 67' (pen.)	Stadium: Városi Stadion; Attendance: 3,500; Referee: Mihály Fábián; Assistant referees: Gy. Ortó, R. Kispál

19 November 2005 12	Debrecen	3–1	Sopron	Debrecen
17:00 CET (UTC+1)	Sidibe 5'; Halmosi 10'; Brnović 43' (pen.); Bernáth (yellow card) 68'; Dombi (yellow card) 74'; B. Virág (yellow card) 90'	Report	Bagoly (yellow card) 26'; Coțan (yellow card) 39'; Signori 58' (pen.); Sifter (yellow card) 69'	Stadium: Oláh Gábor utcai Stadion; Attendance: 6,000; Referee: Szabolcs Saskőy; Assistant referees: Székely, Heibl

27 November 2005 13	Ferencváros	0–0	Debrecen	Budapest
11:30 CET (UTC+1)	Zo. Balog (yellow card) 64'	Report	O. Szabó (yellow card) 62'	Stadium: Üllői úti Stadion; Attendance: 4,000; Referee: Viktor Kassai; Assistant referees: G. Erős, A. Kelemen

3 December 2005 14	Debrecen	6–1	Honvéd	Debrecen
15:00 CET (UTC+1)	Brnović 10'; N. Kovács 13' (o.g.); Sidibe 45' (pen.), 51'; Ferenczi 74', 83'; T. Sándor (yellow card) 77'	Report	Udvari (yellow card) 45'; Lázár (yellow card) 65'; Dobos 77' (pen.)	Stadium: Oláh Gábor utcai Stadion; Attendance: 7,000; Referee: János Makai; Assistant referees: G. Takács, Z. Szabó

10 December 2005 15	Pápa	3–3	Debrecen	Pápa
15:00 CET (UTC+1)	Hercegfalvi 10'; Honma 46'; Kovrig (yellow card) 67', (goal) 88' (pen.); Lászka (yellow card) 79'	Report	Brnović 16'; Sidibe 23'; Bernáth (yellow card) 25' (yellow-red card) 73'; Ferenczi 68' (pen.); P. Máté II (yellow card) 87'; Halmosi (yellow card) 89'	Stadium: Perutz Stadion; Attendance: 1,000; Referee: János Megyebíró; Assistant referees: P. Tóth, I. Albert

24 February 2006 16	Zalaegerszeg	2–0	Debrecen	Zalaegerszeg
19:00 CET (UTC+1)	Kónya 26'; J. Sebők 85', (yellow card) 90'	Report	Nikolov (yellow card) 86'; Komlósi (yellow card) 90'	Stadium: ZTE Arena; Attendance: 2,500; Referee: Tamás Arany; Assistant referees: P. Szabó, Z. Kovács

4 March 2006 17	Debrecen	2–1	Kaposvár	Debrecen
16:00 CET (UTC+1)	Komlósi (yellow card) 21'; Petrók 51' (o.g.); Éger 66' (pen.)	Report	Szakály 45'; A. Pintér (red card) 89'	Stadium: Oláh Gábor utcai Stadion; Attendance: 6,000; Referee: István Vad; Assistant referees: Z. Szalai, T. Vígh

12 March 2006 18	MTK	2–4	Debrecen	Budapest
14:30 CET (UTC+1)	Bori (yellow card) 27'; Hrepka 30'; Koljenović (yellow card) 37'; Czvitkovics 65'	Report	Sidibe 26', 67'; Bogdanović 40'; Nikolov (yellow card) 69'; Éger 78'; Tomić (yellow card) 81'; Ferenczi (yellow card) 90+3'	Stadium: Hidegkuti Nándor Stadion; Attendance: 0 Referee: Zsolt Szabó; Assistant referees: Hegyi, Szpisják

19 March 2006 19	Debrecen	1–1	Győr	Debrecen
11:30 CET (UTC+1)	Sidibe 42' (pen.); Komlósi (yellow card) 50'	Report	Bajzát (yellow card) 35', (goal) 39'; Pusztai (yellow card) 61'	Stadium: Oláh Gábor utcai Stadion; Attendance: 6,000; Referee: József Erdős; Assistant referees: L. Tóth L., T. Vígh

26 March 2006 20	Újpest	2–1	Debrecen	Budapest
11:30 CEST (UTC+2)	P. Máté II 38' (o.g.); Rajczi (yellow card) 43'; Vaskó (yellow card) 64'; Z. Kovács I 90+2'	Report	Nikolov (yellow card) 29', (goal) 62'; Csernyánszki (yellow card) 52'; Szatmári (yellow card) 61'; Halmosi (yellow card) 70'; Bernáth (yellow card) 73'	Stadium: Szusza Ferenc Stadion; Attendance: 5,122; Referee: Zsolt Szabó; Assistant referees: P. Kovács, B. Gaál

1 April 2006 21	Diósgyőr	3–3	Debrecen	Miskolc
17:00 CEST (UTC+2)	Sipeki 28', 44'; Szögedi (yellow card) 56'; P. Máté II 77' (o.g.)	Report	T. Sándor 15'; Dzsudzsák 19'; Dombi (yellow card) 32'; Bogdanović 54', (yellow card) 54'; Komlósi (yellow card) 70'; B. Virág (yellow card) 90'	Stadium: Diósgyőri Stadion; Attendance: 6,000; Referee: Szabolcs Saskőy; Assistant referees: P. Kovács, Heibl

8 April 2006 22	Vasas	0–1	Debrecen	Budapest
17:00 CEST (UTC+2)	Bárányos (yellow card) 43'; Zováth (yellow card) 69'; Janjić (red card) 90+1'	Report	Böőr (yellow card) 29'; P. Máté II 62'	Stadium: Illovszky Rudolf Stadion; Attendance: 3,000; Referee: József Erdős; Assistant referees: Szpisják, I. Albert

14 April 2006 23	Debrecen	6–1	Rákospalota	Debrecen
19:00 CEST (UTC+2)	Halmosi 5', 27'; Bernáth (yellow card) 18'; Böőr (yellow card) 37'; Brnović 49', 56', 67'; Gá. Horváth I 72' (o.g.)	Report	Polonkai 10'; Török (yellow card) 13'; Cseri (yellow card) 78'	Stadium: Oláh Gábor utcai Stadion; Attendance: 3,500; Referee: Sándor Andó-Szabó; Assistant referees: Szpisják, P. Tóth

22 April 2006 24	Pécs	0–2	Debrecen	Pécs
18:00 CEST (UTC+2)	Sólyom (yellow card) 15'; Szabados (yellow card) 17'; Tarcsa (yellow card) 79'	Report	Sidibe 15' (pen.), 72'; Komlósi (yellow card) 49'	Stadium: Stadion PMFC; Attendance: 3,500; Referee: Sándor Gergely; Assistant referees: Z. Kovács, N. Ferencz

30 April 2006 25	Fehérvár	1–2	Debrecen	Székesfehérvár
11:30 CEST (UTC+2)	Gá. Horváth II (yellow card) 37'; Dvéri (yellow card) 63'; Sitku (yellow card) 69'; D. Nagy (yellow card) 77'; Csizmadia 81'	Report	Szatmári (yellow card) 15'; Bernáth (yellow card) 22'; Halmosi (yellow card) 51'; T. Sándor 61'; P. Máté II 90'	Stadium: Sóstói Stadion; Attendance: 4,500; Referee: János Megyebíró; Assistant referees: Szpisják, I. Albert

6 May 2006 26	Debrecen	1–0	Tatabánya	Debrecen
19:00 CEST (UTC+2)	Bogdanović 32'; Szatmári (yellow card) 33'	Report	Megyesi (yellow card) 59'; Bakrač (yellow card) 69'; Kerényi (yellow card) 76'	Stadium: Oláh Gábor utcai Stadion; Attendance: 9,000; Referee: Károly Török; Assistant referees: T. Márkus, Z. Márton

13 May 2006 27	Sopron	0–2	Debrecen	Sopron
19:00 CEST (UTC+2)	A. Horváth (yellow card) 58'	Report	Sidibe 33'; Bernáth (yellow card) 44'; Halmosi 86'	Stadium: Káposztás utcai Stadion; Attendance: 3,200; Referee: Péter Solymosi; Assistant referees: Varga II, Kispál

21 May 2006 28	Debrecen	3–1	Ferencváros	Debrecen
11:30 CEST (UTC+2)	P. Máté II 3'; Z. Kiss I (yellow card) 35'; Dzsudzsák 38'; Vukmir (yellow card) 54'; Sidibe 61' (pen.)	Report	Zo. Balog (yellow card) 4' (yellow-red card) 26'; Lipcsei (yellow card) 44', (goal) 45' (pen.); Bognár (yellow card) 75'	Stadium: Oláh Gábor utcai Stadion; Attendance: 11,000; Referee: Péter Solymosi; Assistant referees: T. Vígh, L. Tóth

26 May 2006 29	Honvéd	0–1	Debrecen	Budapest
19:00 CEST (UTC+2)	Udvari (yellow card) 45'	Report	Bogdanović 12' (pen.), (yellow card) 48'	Stadium: Bozsik József Stadion; Attendance: 2,000; Referee: Attila Hanacsek; Assistant referees: I. Tóth, J. Heibl

3 June 2006 30	Debrecen	4–1	Pápa	Debrecen
16:20 CEST (UTC+2)	T. Sándor 21'; Brnović 45'; Halmosi 58'; Bogdanović 82'	Report	Fabinho 42'; Mumba (yellow card) 80'	Stadium: Oláh Gábor utcai Stadion; Attendance: 11,000; Referee: Sándor Andó-Szabó; Assistant referees: Székely, I. Tóth

=== Magyar Kupa ===
==== Round of 16 ====
26 October 2005 First leg	Tatabánya	0–2	Debrecen	Tatabánya
14:00 CEST (UTC+2)	Deme (yellow card); T. Nagy (yellow card)	Report	B. Virág (yellow card); Éger (yellow card); Hegedűs (yellow card); Hristov 14'; Dzsudzsák 54', (yellow card)	Stadium: Városi Stadion; Attendance: 1,500; Referee: Attila Dubraviczky; Assistant referees: I. Nagy I, J. Balogh

9 November 2005 Second leg	Debrecen	2–1 (4–1 agg.)	Tatabánya	Debrecen
18:00 CET (UTC+1)	Szatmári (yellow card); Sidibe 7'; Hegedűs 88', (yellow card)	Report	Filó (yellow card); Forgó (yellow card); Z. Balogh (yellow card); Kerényi (yellow card); Dupai 66' (pen.)	Stadium: Oláh Gábor utcai Stadion; Attendance: 7,500; Referee: József Erdős; Assistant referees: I. Tóth, Z. Szalai
Note: Debrecen won 4–1 on aggregate.

==== Quarter-finals ====
15 March 2006 First leg	Újpest	0–1	Debrecen	Budapest
18:00 CET (UTC+1)	Erős (yellow card) 9'; N. Tóth (yellow card) 15'; G. Sándor (yellow card) 17'	Report	Nikolov (yellow card) 20'; Dombi (yellow card) 38' (yellow-red card) 45'; Csernyánszki (yellow card) 61'; Sidibe 68' (pen.)	Stadium: Szusza Ferenc Stadion; Attendance: 4,358; Referee: Attila Dubraviczky; Assistant referees: I. Tóth, A. Nagy I

5 April 2006 Second leg	Debrecen	2–0 (3–0 agg.)	Újpest	Debrecen
18:00 CEST (UTC+2)	Szatmári (yellow card) 18'; Sidibe 24' (pen.), (yellow card) 63'; B. Virág 30'; Halmosi (yellow card) 32'; T. Sándor (yellow card) 54'	Report	Vlaszák (yellow card) 24'; Vaskó (yellow card) 59'; N. Tóth (yellow card) 62'	Stadium: Oláh Gábor utcai Stadion; Attendance: 6,500; Referee: Mihály Fábián; Assistant referees: Ortó, Márkus
Note: Debrecen won 3–0 on aggregate.

==== Semi-finals ====
25 April 2006 First leg	Debrecen	0–1	Fehérvár	Debrecen
18:00 CEST (UTC+2)	Szatmári (yellow card) 38'; T. Sándor (yellow card) 44'; B. Virág (yellow card) 62'	Report	Schwarcz (yellow card) 32'; Kuttor (yellow card) 33'; B. Farkas (yellow card) 37' (yellow-red card) 90+3'; Dvéri 44'; Lattenstein (yellow card) 71'; Gá. Horváth II (yellow card) 75'; Božić (yellow card) 83'	Stadium: Oláh Gábor utcai Stadion; Attendance: 6,000; Referee: Zsolt Szabó; Assistant referees: Kispál, Hegyi

3 May 2006 Second leg	Fehérvár	2–2 (3–2 agg.)	Debrecen	Székesfehérvár
18:00 CEST (UTC+2)	Sitku 40'; Csizmadia 78' (pen.); Tudor (red card) 86'; Györök (red card) 88'; Dvéri (yellow card) 90+4'	Report	Bogdanović 23' (pen.); Halmosi (yellow card) 26'; B. Virág (yellow card) 60'; Sidibe (yellow card) 77'; Dzsudzsák 82'; Vukmir (yellow card) 85'	Stadium: Sóstói Stadion; Attendance: 4,000; Referee: Ferenc Bede; Assistant referees: Tompos, T. Vámos
Note: Fehérvár won 3–2 on aggregate.

=== UEFA Champions League ===
==== Qualifying rounds ====
===== Second qualifying round =====
27 July 2005 First leg	Debrecen (Hungary)	3–0	(Croatia) Hajduk Split	Debrecen, Hungary
20:45 CEST (UTC+2)	Bogdanović 26', 40'; Kerekes 58'; Szatmári (yellow card) 66'	Report	Bartulović (yellow card) 5'	Stadium: Oláh Gábor utcai Stadion; Attendance: 10,000; Referee: Knut Kircher (Germany)

3 August 2005 Second leg	Hajduk Split (Croatia)	0–5 (0–8 agg.)	(Hungary) Debrecen	Split, Croatia
20:15 CEST (UTC+2)	Đolonga (yellow card) 21'; Biščević (yellow card) 48'; Grgurović (yellow card) 51'	Report	Halmosi 1', 27'; Nikolov (yellow card) 13'; Kerekes 22'; Sidibe 76'; Z. Kiss I 90'	Stadium: Stadion Poljud; Attendance: 25,000; Referee: Richard Havrilla (Slovakia)
Note: Debrecen won 8–0 on aggregate.

===== Third qualifying round =====
9 August 2005 First leg	Manchester United (England)	3–0	(Hungary) Debrecen	Manchester, England
20:30 CEST (UTC+2)	Rooney 7'; Keane (yellow card) 31'; Van Nistelrooy 49'; Ronaldo 63'	Report	P. Máté II (yellow card) 11'; Vukmir (yellow card) 57'; Nikolov (yellow card) 72'	Stadium: Old Trafford; Attendance: 52,000; Referee: Luis Medina Cantalejo (Spain)

24 August 2005 Second leg	Debrecen (Hungary)	0–3 (0–6 agg.)	(England) Manchester United	Budapest, Hungary (Note: The match was played at the Ferenc Puskás Stadium in Budapest, instead of Debrecen regular stadium, the Oláh Gábor utcai Stadion in Debrecen.)
20:30 CEST (UTC+2)	P. Máté II (yellow card) 38'	Report	Smith (yellow card) 13'; Heinze 20', 61'; Richardson 65'	Stadium: Ferenc Puskás Stadium; Attendance: 25,000; Referee: Massimo Busacca (Switzerland)
Note: Manchester United won 6–0 on aggregate.

=== UEFA Cup ===
==== First round ====
15 September 2005 First leg	Shakhtar Donetsk (Ukraine)	4–1	(Hungary) Debrecen	Donetsk, Ukraine
20:30 CEST (UTC+2)	Elano 1'; Brandão 36', 45' (pen.); Vorobey 72'; Tolga (yellow card) 75'	Report	Szatmári (yellow card) 38'; Sidibe 88'	Stadium: RSC Olimpiyskiy; Attendance: 25,000; Referee: Joeri Van De Velde (Belgium)

29 September 2005 Second leg	Debrecen (Hungary)	0–2 (1–6 agg.)	(Ukraine) Shakhtar Donetsk	Debrecen, Hungary
20:00 CEST (UTC+2)	B. Virág (yellow card) 12'; Halmosi (yellow card) 67'; Éger (yellow card) 90+2'	Report	Brandão 18'; Elano 24'	Stadium: Oláh Gábor utcai Stadion; Attendance: 7,000; Referee: Jonas Eriksson (Sweden)
Note: Shakhtar Donetsk won 6–1 on aggregate.

== Statistics ==
=== Overall ===
Appearances (Apps) numbers are for appearances in competitive games only, including sub appearances.
Source: Competitions

No.	Player	Pos.	Nemzeti Bajnokság I				Magyar Kupa				Szuperkupa				UEFA Champions League				UEFA Cup				Total			
No.	Player	Pos.	Apps	Goal	Yellow card	Red card	Apps	Goal	Yellow card	Red card	Apps	Goal	Yellow card	Red card	Apps	Goal	Yellow card	Red card	Apps	Goal	Yellow card	Red card	Apps	Goal	Yellow card	Red card
1	(Croatia) Sandro Tomić	GK	3		1		2																5		1	
2	(Hungary) Péter Máté	DF	25	5	5		4				1	1	1		4		2		1				35	6	8	
3	(Hungary) Csaba Szatmári	DF	20		6		4		3		1				4		1		2		1		31		11	
5	(Serbia and Montenegro) Dragan Vukmir	DF	12		2		2		1						3		1						17		4	
6	(Hungary) Béla Virág	MF	16	1	3	1	5	1	3										1		1		22	2	7	1
7	(Hungary) Tibor Dombi	MF	26		3		3		2	1	2				4				1				36		5	1
8	(Hungary) Csaba Madar	MF	24		1		5				2				1				1				33		1	
9	(Hungary) Tamás Sándor	MF	27	5	2		3		2		2	2			4				1				37	7	4	
10	(Serbia and Montenegro) Igor Bogdanović	FW	17	9	2		3	1			2				4	2							26	12	2	
10	(North Macedonia) Georgi Hristov	FW	2				2	1															4	1		
11	(Serbia and Montenegro) Bojan Brnović	FW	25	13			4				1				2				1				33	13		
12	(Hungary) Gábor Máthé	GK																								
13	(Brazil) Franciel	FW	1				1																2			
14	(Hungary) Gyula Hegedűs	DF	4				2	1	2		1												7	1	2	
16	(Hungary) Ádám Komlósi	DF	17		6		3												1				21		6	
17	(Hungary) Norbert Mészáros	FW	9				1				1								2				13			
18	(Hungary) Zsombor Kerekes	FW	1								1	1			4	2							6	3		
19	(Hungary) Balázs Dzsudzsák	MF	10	2	1		3	2	1		1								1				15	4	2	
20	(Hungary) Gergő Jeremiás	MF	3				1												1				5			
20	(Hungary) Aladár Virág	DF																								
21	(Croatia) Ronald Habi	MF									2		2		1								3		2	
22	(Hungary) Csaba Bernáth	DF	22		8	1	5				1				1				2				31		8	1
23	(Slovakia) Otto Szabó	DF	6		1		1				1												8		1	
24	(Hungary) Norbert Csernyánszki	GK	27		1		4		1		2				4				2				39		2	
25	(Hungary) Balázs Nikolov	MF	7	1	4		2		1		2		1		3		2		2				16	1	8	
26	(Senegal) Ibrahima Sidibe	FW	28	15	1		5	3	2						2	1			2	1			37	20	3	
28	(Hungary) Péter Halmosi	MF	26	7	7	1	5		2		2				4	2			2		1		39	9	10	1
30	(Hungary) Zoltán Kiss	MF	18	2	5		3				1	1	1		3	1			2				27	4	6	
31	(Hungary) István Ferenczi	FW	11	5	2		3																14	5	2	
73	(Hungary) László Éger	DF	21	2	1		5		1		2				4				2		1		34	2	3	
81	(Hungary) Zoltán Böőr	MF	10		2		3								3								16		2	
Own goals				2																				2		
Totals				69	64	3		9	21	1		5	5			8	6			1	4			92	100	4

=== Hat-tricks ===
No.	Player	Against	Result	Date	Competition
11	(Serbia and Montenegro) Bojan Brnović	Rákospalota (H)	6–1	14 April 2006	Nemzeti Bajnokság I

=== Clean sheets ===
			Clean sheets					
No.	Player	Games Played	Nemzeti Bajnokság I	Magyar Kupa	Szuperkupa	UEFA Champions League	UEFA Cup	Total
24	(Hungary) Norbert Csernyánszki	39	8	2	1	2		13
1	(Hungary) Sandro Tomić	5		1				1
12	(Hungary) Gábor Máthé							
Totals			8	3	1	2		14
