= Csaba Szatmári =

Csaba Szatmári may refer to:

- Csaba Szatmári (footballer, born 1973), Hungarian footballer for Debrecen and Nyíregyháza
- Csaba Szatmári (footballer, born 1994), Hungarian footballer for Debrecen and Diósgyőr
