= Róbert Zsolnai =

Hungarian footballer

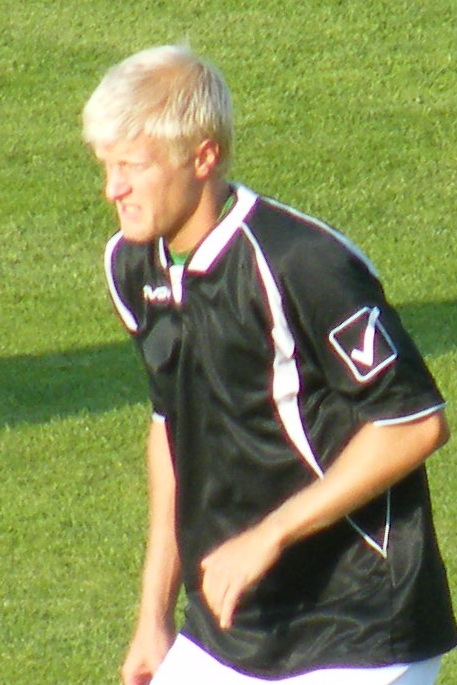
- Zsolnai in 2010

Personal information
- Full name: Róbert Zsolnai
- Date of birth: 11 April 1982 (age 44)
- Place of birth: Budapest, Hungary
- Height: 1.92 m (6 ft 4 in)
- Position: Forward

Team information
- Current team: Szolnok
- Number: 24

Youth career
- 1996–1998: Dabas
- 1998–1999: Csepel
- 1999–2000: Vác

Senior career*
| Years | Team | Apps | (Gls) |
| 2000–2001 | Vasas | 9 | (0) |
| 2001–2002 | Csepel | ? | (?) |
| 2002–2003 | Kecskemét | 33 | (6) |
| 2003–2004 | BKV Előre | ? | (?) |
| 2004–2006 | Kaposvár | 50 | (9) |
| 2006–2007 | Debrecen | 26 | (5) |
| 2007–2011 | Honvéd | 22 | (1) |
| 2008–2010 | → Kaposvár (loan) | 19 | (8) |
| 2011–2012 | Szolnok | 16 | (3) |
| 2012–2014 | Puskás | 39 | (15) |
| 2014– | Szolnok | 20 | (4) |
- * Club domestic league appearances and goals as of 3 August 2015

Róbert Zsolnai (born 11 April 1982 in Budapest, Hungary) is a professional Hungarian footballer currently playing for Budapest Honvéd FC in the Hungarian Borsodi Liga. His former clubs include Vasas SC, BKV Előre, Vác FC Zollner, Kaposvár.

On 24 November 2007, it was announced, that he will leave for Budapest Honvéd FC.

== Club career ==
=== Vasas SC ===
He made his debut of 17 March 2001 against FC Sopron in a match that ended 1-1.

=== Kaposvári Rákóczi FC ===
He made his debut of 14 August 2004 against FC Sopron in a match that ended 0-0.

=== Debreceni VSC ===
He made his debut of 29 July 2006 against Pécsi Mecsek FC in a match that ended 2–1.

=== Budapest Honved ===
He made his debut of 23 February 2008 against Rákospalotai EAC in a match that ended 1-1.

== Club honours ==
=== Vasas SC ===
- Hungarian National Championship I:
  - 3rd place: 2000–01

=== Debreceni VSC ===
- Hungarian National Championship I:
  - Winner: 2006–07
- Hungarian Cup:
  - Runners-up: 2006–07
- Hungarian Super Cup:
  - Winner: 2006

=== Budapest Honvéd FC ===
- Hungarian Cup:
  - Runners-up: 2007–08
- Hungarian Super Cup:
  - Runners-up: 2007, 2009
