= Péter Halmosi =

Hungarian footballer

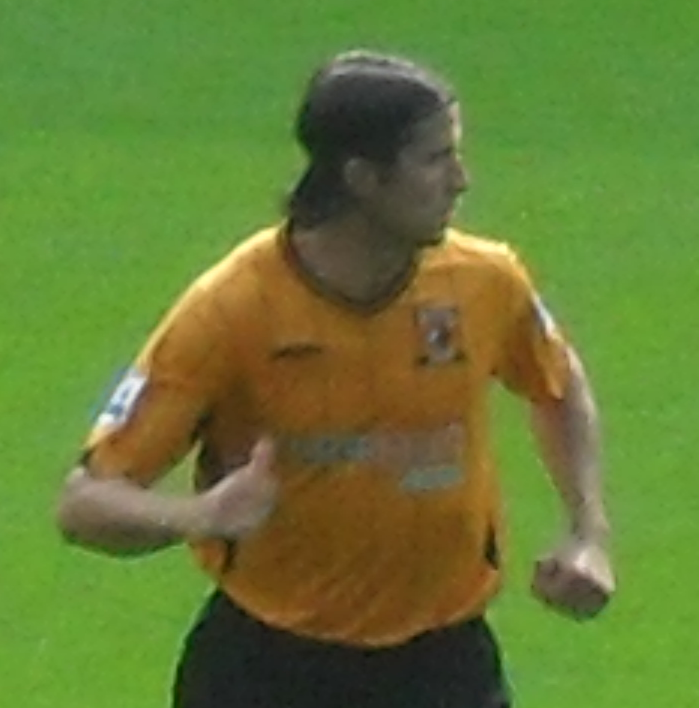
- Halmosi playing for Hull City in 2009

Personal information
- Full name: Péter Halmosi
- Date of birth: 25 September 1979 (age 47)
- Place of birth: Szombathely, Hungary
- Height: 1.78 m (5 ft 10 in)
- Position: Midfielder

Youth career
- 1996–1998: Haladás

Senior career*
Years	Team	Apps	(Gls)
1998–2002	Haladás	100	(18)
2002–2003	Grazer AK	17	(3)
2003–2007	Debrecen	99	(19)
2007	→ Plymouth Argyle (loan)	16	(4)
2007–2008	Plymouth Argyle	43	(8)
2008–2011	Hull City	18	(0)
2010	→ Haladás (loan)	15	(3)
2011–2018	Haladás	206	(28)
Total		514	(83)

International career^{‡}
1999–2000	Hungary U21	2	(0)
2002–2013	Hungary	35	(0)
- * Club domestic league appearances and goals ‡ National team caps and goals as of 25 September 2026

Péter Halmosi (Hungarian pronunciation: [ˈpeːtɛr ˈhɒlmoʃi]; born 25 September 1979) is a Hungarian retired professional footballer who played as a midfielder. At international level, he won 35 caps for his country. His previous clubs include Szombathelyi Haladás, Grazer AK, Debrecen, Plymouth Argyle and Hull City.

== Biography ==
Born in the ancient western city of Szombathely, Halmosi grew up in a family with significant sporting background. His father, Zoltán, won 11 caps playing for Hungary, and his mother also was involved in professional sport, representing Hungary as an athlete at several international events.

== Career ==
Halmosi played his first game for his hometown club Szombathelyi Haladás at the age of 18 and stayed at the club until he was 23. In 2002, he joined Austrian side Grazer AK making 17 appearances and scoring 3 goals for the club. After playing several games for the reserves he returned to Hungary signing for Debrecen. His move to Debrecen turned out to be a successful stay and he spent four years with the club.

Halmosi next joined Plymouth Argyle, initially on loan until the end of the 2006–07 season, with a view to a permanent move at the end of the season. A £400,000 permanent deal with Argyle was completed on 16 May 2007, making him the record signing for the club at that time. He had been linked with moves to other clubs in the United Kingdom including Celtic and Blackburn Rovers. Halmosi made his Argyle debut in a 3–1 away win against Norwich City on 13 January 2007.

On 15 July 2008, Halmosi was spotted at Hull City's pre-season friendly against North Ferriby United. One day later, he signed a four-year contract with Hull for a fee in excess of £2 million, becoming, at the time, their record signing and their 6th of the summer. He made his Hull debut in the friendly match against Chesterfield on 22 July 2008 at Saltergate. His competitive debut came shortly after the hour mark in Hull City's first ever top flight game, against Fulham on 16 August 2008, as a substitute for Nick Barmby. He scored his first goal for the club in an FA Cup victory over against Sheffield United on 14 February 2009. On the final day of the January transfer window Halmosi joined Hungarian side Szombathelyi Haladas on loan until the end of the 2009–10 season.

On 4 January 2011, Halmosi left Hull City by mutual consent. Ten days later, he returned to Szombathelyi Haladás on a three-and-a-half-year contract.

== Career statistics ==
As of 5 December 2018.

=== Club ===
Club	Season	League		Cup		League Cup		Other		Total	
Club	Season	Apps	Goals	Apps	Goals	Apps	Goals	Apps	Goals	Apps	Goals
Szombathelyi Haladás	2001–02	38	2	4	1	0	0	0	0	42	3
Grazer AK	2002–03	17	3	0	0	0	0	0	0	17	3
Debrecen	2003–04	29	5	0	0	0	0	5	0	34	5
Debrecen	2004–05	28	5	0	0	0	0	0	0	28	5
Debrecen	2005–06	26	7	0	0	0	0	5	2	31	9
Debrecen	2006–07	16	2	0	0	0	0	0	0	16	2
Debrecen	Total	99	19	0	0	0	0	10	2	109	21
Plymouth Argyle	2006–07	16	4	3	0	0	0	0	0	19	4
Plymouth Argyle	2007–08	43	8	2	1	2	0	0	0	47	9
Plymouth Argyle	Total	59	12	5	1	2	0	0	0	66	13
Hull City	2008–09	18	0	5	1	1	0	0	0	24	1
Hull City	2009–10	0	0	1	0	2	0	0	0	3	0
Hull City	Total	18	0	6	1	3	0	0	0	27	1
Szombathelyi Haladás	2010–11	15	3	0	0	2	0	0	0	17	3
Szombathelyi Haladás	2011–12	27	5	2	0	1	0	0	0	30	5
Szombathelyi Haladás	2012–13	21	5	2	1	0	0	0	0	23	6
Szombathelyi Haladás	2013–14	25	6	0	0	0	0	0	0	25	6
Szombathelyi Haladás	2014–15	24	3	0	0	0	0	0	0	24	3
Szombathelyi Haladás	2015–16	29	3	0	0	0	0	0	0	29	3
Szombathelyi Haladás	2016–17	29	1	0	0	0	0	0	0	29	1
Szombathelyi Haladás	2017–18	27	0	0	0	0	0	0	0	27	0
Szombathelyi Haladás	2018–19	10	0	2	0	0	0	0	0	12	0
Szombathelyi Haladás	Total	207	26	6	1	3	0	0	0	216	27
Career total		438	62	21	4	8	0	10	2	477	68

Other includes the UEFA Champions League and UEFA Cup.

=== International ===
As of 14 November 2009

Appearances and goals by national team and year
Team	Year	Competitive		Friendly		Total	
Team	Year	Apps	Goals	Apps	Goals	Apps	Goals
Hungary	2002	0	0	3	0	3	0
Hungary	2003	0	0	0	0	0	0
Hungary	2004	0	0	0	0	0	0
Hungary	2005	3	0	2	0	5	0
Hungary	2006	2	0	2	0	4	0
Hungary	2007	3	0	2	0	5	0
Hungary	2008	2	0	3	0	5	0
Hungary	2009	5	0	3	0	8	0
Hungary	2010	0	0	0	0	0	0
Hungary	2011	0	0	1	0	1	0
Hungary	2012	0	0	3	0	3	0
Hungary	2013	1	0	0	0	0	0
Total		15	0	19	0	34	0

== Honours ==
Debrecen

- Hungarian League: 2005, 2006
- Hungarian Super Cup: 2005, 2006

Szombathelyi Haladás

- Hungarian Cup runner-up: 2002

Individual

- Named in the Hungarian National Championship I all-star team (nemzetisport.hu): 2010–11
- Zilahi Prize: 2005
