= Dragan Vukmir =

Serbian footballer

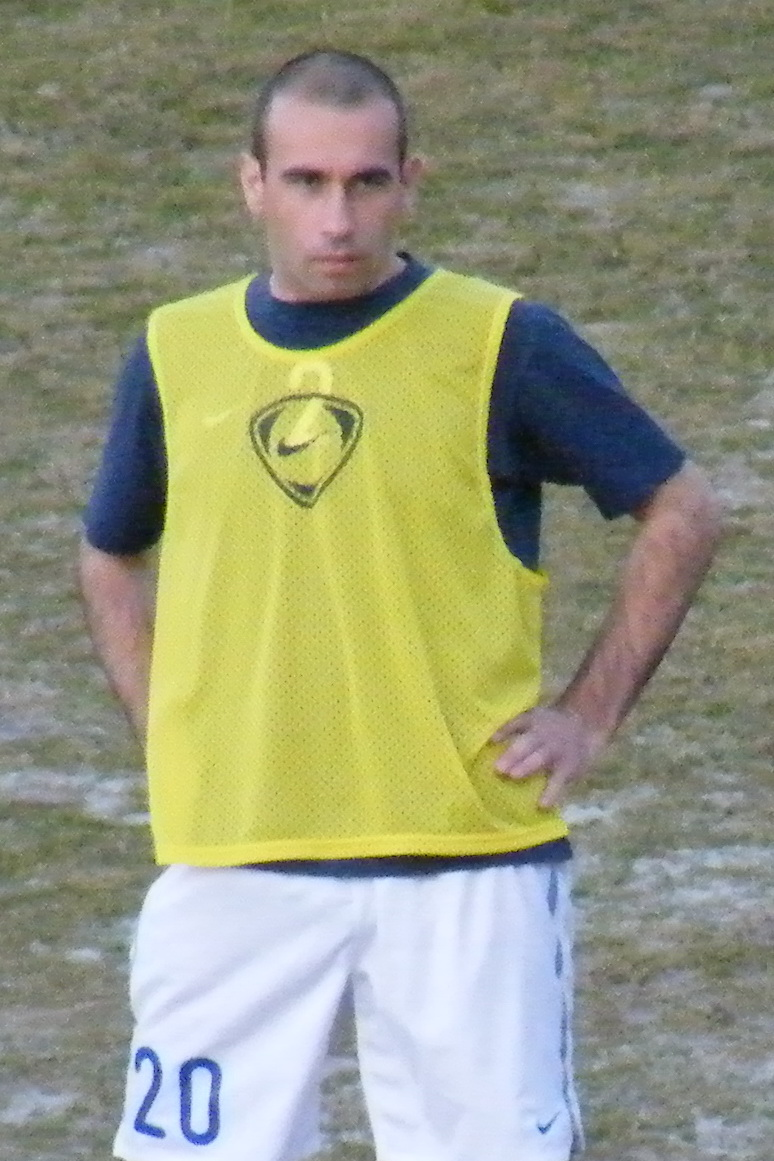
- Vukmir with MTK Budapest in 2011

Personal information
- Date of birth: 2 August 1978 (age 48)
- Place of birth: Sremska Mitrovica, SFR Yugoslavia
- Height: 1.84 m (6 ft 0 in)
- Position: Defender

Team information
- Current team: BVSC-Zugló (manager)

Youth career
- Srem

Senior career*
Years	Team	Apps	(Gls)
1998–1999	Dinamo Pančevo		
2000–2001	Rad	4	(0)
2001	Dinamo Pančevo		
2002–2005	Ferencváros	93	(0)
2005–2008	Debrecen	53	(0)
2008	Dalian Shide	7	(0)
2009–2010	Budapest Honvéd	30	(0)
2010–2017	MTK Budapest	144	(1)
2010–2017	MTK Budapest II	8	(0)
2017	III. Kerületi TVE	0	(0)
2017–2019	Unione FC	10	(0)
Total		349	(1)

International career
2004	Serbia and Montenegro	1	(0)

Managerial career
- 2018–2020: Bicske
- 2020–2022: Szeged-Csanád
- 2022: Diósgyőr
- 2023–2024: Siófok
- 2024–2025: Radnički Sremska Mitrovica
- 2025–: BVSC-Zugló
- * Club domestic league appearances and goals

Dragan Vukmir (Serbian Cyrillic: Драган Вукмир; born 2 August 1978) is a Serbian professional football manager and a former defender. He is the manager of Hungarian club BVSC-Zugló. He was capped once for Serbia and Montenegro.

Vukmir spent the majority of his career in Hungary, representing four clubs and amassing 299 appearances in the top flight. He won three national championships and three national cups.

== Coaching career ==
Vukmir was hired as a manager by Diósgyőr on 8 April 2022. He was fired on 23 August 2022. On 3 January 2023, Vukmir was appointed manager of BFC Siófok.

On 16 June 2025, he was appointed as the Nemzeti Bajnokság II club Budapesti VSC.

== Personal life ==
His daughter Elena is a promising rhythmic gymnast who represents Hungary internationally.

== Honours ==
Ferencváros

- Nemzeti Bajnokság I: 2003–04
- Magyar Kupa: 2002–03, 2003–04

Debrecen

- Nemzeti Bajnokság I: 2005–06, 2006–07
- Szuperkupa: 2006, 2007

Budapest Honvéd

- Magyar Kupa: 2008–09

MTK Budapest

- Nemzeti Bajnokság II: 2011–12

== Career statistics ==
=== Club ===
As of matches played 15 May 2021

Appearances and goals by club, season and competition
Club	Season	League			Cup		League Cup		Europe		Other		Total	
Club	Season	Division	Apps	Goals	Apps	Goals	Apps	Goals	Apps	Goals	Apps	Goals	Apps	Goals
Ferencváros	2001–02	Nemzeti Bajnokság I	12	0	0	0	-		-		-		12	0
Ferencváros	2002–03	Nemzeti Bajnokság I	29	0	5	0	-		6	0	-		40	0
Ferencváros	2003–04	Nemzeti Bajnokság I	24	0	5	0	-		4	0	-		33	0
Ferencváros	2004–05	Nemzeti Bajnokság I	28	0	3	0	-		9	0	-		40	0
Ferencváros	Total		93	0	13	0	-		19	0	-		125	0
Debrecen	2005–06	Nemzeti Bajnokság I	12	0	0	0	-		3	0	-		15	0
Debrecen	2006–07	Nemzeti Bajnokság I	24	0	7	0	-		2	0	-		33	0
Debrecen	2007–08	Nemzeti Bajnokság I	17	0	1	0	8	0	2	0	-		28	0
Debrecen	Total		53	0	8	0	8	0	7	0	-		76	0
Budapest Honvéd	2008–09	Nemzeti Bajnokság I	10	0	5	0	3	0	-		-		18	0
Budapest Honvéd	2009–10	Nemzeti Bajnokság I	20	0	4	0	1	0	1	0	-		26	0
Budapest Honvéd	Total		30	0	9	0	4	0	1	0	-		44	0
MTK Budapest	2010–11	Nemzeti Bajnokság I	16	0	6	0	0	0	-		-		22	0
MTK Budapest	2011–12	Nemzeti Bajnokság II	21	0	9	0	5	0	-		-		35	0
MTK Budapest	2012–13	Nemzeti Bajnokság I	30	0	1	0	1	0	2	0	-		34	0
MTK Budapest	2013–14	Nemzeti Bajnokság I	28	1	2	0	1	0	-		-		31	1
MTK Budapest	2014–15	Nemzeti Bajnokság I	27	0	4	0	5	0	-		-		36	0
MTK Budapest	2015–16	Nemzeti Bajnokság I	8	0	2	0	-		2	0	-		12	0
MTK Budapest	2016–17	Nemzeti Bajnokság I	14	0	1	0	-		-		-		15	0
MTK Budapest	Total		144	1	25	0	12	0	4	0	-		185	1
Career total			320	1	55	0	24	0	31	0	0	0	430	1
