= Tamás Sándor =

Hungarian footballer and manager (born 1974)

Personal information
- Date of birth: 20 June 1974 (age 52)
- Place of birth: Debrecen, Hungary
- Height: 1.83 m (6 ft 0 in)
- Position: Midfielder

Senior career*
Years	Team	Apps	(Gls)
1991–1997	Debreceni VSC	151	(69)
1997–1998	Torino	1	(0)
1998	→ Gençlerbirliği (loan)	15	(2)
1998–2002	Beitar Jerusalem	115	(24)
2002–2008	Debreceni VSC	150	(25)

International career
1994–2000	Hungary	11	(0)

Managerial career
- 2011–2016: Debreceni VSC (assistant)
- 2017–2018: Sényő
- 2020–2023: Debreceni EAC
- * Club domestic league appearances and goals

Tamás Sándor (born 20 June 1974) is a Hungarian football manager and former professional player. As a footballer he last played for Báránd KSE, and formerly for Debreceni VSC.

== Club career ==
Tamás Sándor began his career in his hometown team Debreceni VSC in 1991 and played for the side till 1997 when he joined Italian side Torino Calcio where he failed to impress. He was footballer of the year in 1996 in Hungary. He earned 11 caps for Hungary. He is three-time champion with Debrecen as a captain and all-time top goal scorer of the team. He represented the Hungary national team at the 1996 Summer Olympics in Atlanta, where Hungary failed to progress from the group stage.

Tamas had a four-year spell in one of the biggest Israeli clubs, Beitar Jerusalem.

In 2009, he retired from professional football, and signed to Hajdu-Bihar Division 1 amateur team, Báránd KSE.

== Managerial career ==
On 27 June 2023, Sándor departed as manager of Nemzeti Bajnokság III club DEAC after three years in charge.

== Popular culture ==
In 2018 Tamás was referenced in the song ״על התמאש ועל העוקץ״ by האחים צברי.

== Honours ==
=== Club ===
Debreceni VSC

- Nemzeti Bajnokság I: 2004–05, 2005–06, 2006–07
  - Runner-up: 2007–08
- Magyar Kupa: 2007–08
  - Runner-up: 2002–03, 2006–07
- Szuperkupa: 2005, 2006, 2007
- Ligakupa runner-up: 2007–08

Beitar Jerusalem F.C.

- Peace Cup: 2000–01

Individual

- Player of the Year in Hungary: 1997, 2004, 2005, 2006
- Zilahi Prize: 2004, 2006
