= Béla Virág =

Hungarian footballer

Personal information
- Full name: Béla Virág
- Date of birth: 12 April 1976 (age 50)
- Place of birth: Marcali, Hungary
- Height: 1.87 m (6 ft 2 in)
- Position: Midfielder

Youth career
- BFC Siófok

Senior career*
Years	Team	Apps	(Gls)
1993–1997	BFC Siófok	17	(2)
1997–2001	FC Sachsen Leipzig		
2001–2003	SC Austria Lustenau	34	(1)
2003–2004	BFC Siófok	26	(1)
2004–2007	Debreceni VSC	37	(3)
2007–2008	FC Sachsen Leipzig		
2008–2009	FC Eilenburg		

International career
1996–1997	Hungary U-21	3	(0)
- * Club domestic league appearances and goals

Béla Virág (born 12 April 1976 in Marcali) is a Hungarian football player who last plays for FC Sachsen Leipzig.

== Honours ==
- Hungarian League: winner 2004–05, 2005–06, 2006–07
- Hungarian Cup: Runner-up 2007
