= Gábor Máthé (footballer) =

Hungarian footballer

Personal information
- Date of birth: 10 August 1985 (age 41)
- Place of birth: Békéscsaba, Hungary
- Height: 1.86 m (6 ft 1 in)
- Position: Goalkeeper

Team information
- Current team: Békéscsaba
- Number: 1

Youth career
- 2002–2003: Újpest
- 2003–2004: Debrecen

Senior career*
Years	Team	Apps	(Gls)
2004–2006	Debrecen	0	(0)
2006	→ Létavértes (loan)	4	(0)
2006–2008	Dunaújváros	8	(0)
2007–2008	→ Nyíregyháza (loan)	9	(0)
2008–	Békéscsaba	72	(0)
- * Club domestic league appearances and goals as of 10 April 2013

Gábor Máthé (born 10 August 1985) is a Hungarian football (goalkeeper) player who currently plays for Békéscsaba 1912 Előre SE.

== Personal life ==
Following a conviction for drug dealing, Máthé was imprisoned for nine months.
