= János Balogh (footballer) =

Hungarian footballer

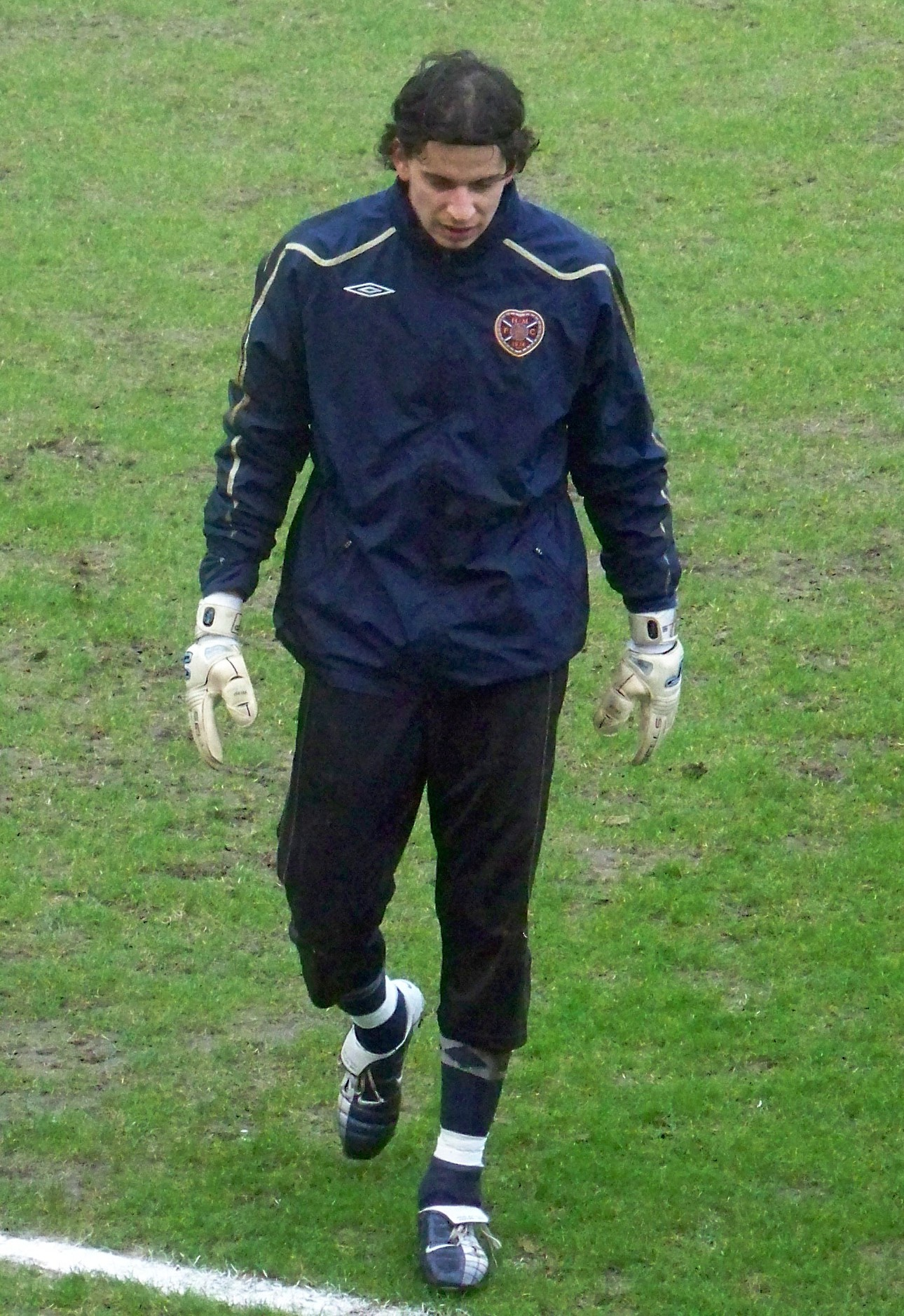

Personal information
- Date of birth: 29 November 1982 (age 43)
- Place of birth: Debrecen, Hungary
- Height: 1.92 m (6 ft 4 in)
- Position: Goalkeeper

Senior career*
Years	Team	Apps	(Gls)
2000–2004	Debrecen	37	(0)
2004–2005	Sopron	30	(0)
2005–2006	Nyíregyháza	3	(0)
2006–2009	Debrecen	23	(0)
2008–2009	→ Heart of Midlothian (loan)	19	(0)
2009–2011	Heart of Midlothian	16	(0)
2012–2015	Nyíregyháza	88	(0)
2015–2017	Debrecen	0	(0)
2017–2018	Csenger FC		

International career
1996–1997	Hungary U-14	1	(0)
1998–1999	Hungary U-16	6	(0)
1999–2000	Hungary U-17	2	(0)
2002–2003	Hungary U-21	8	(0)
2007	Hungary	1	(0)

Managerial career
- 2019–2024: Debrecen (GK coach)
- * Club domestic league appearances and goals

János Balogh (born 29 November 1982) is a Hungarian football coach and a former goalkeeper. He is the goalkeepers coach with Debrecen.

== Club career ==
=== Early career ===
Balogh began his career with hometown club Debreceni VSC, picking up a Magyar Kupa winner's medal in 2001. In 2004, he joined FC Sopron for a season where he won the Hungarian cup for a second time, before spending a brief spell with Nyíregyháza Spartacus and then returning to Debreceni VSC. The following seasons proved to be very successful domestically as Balogh won the Hungarian League and the Szuperkupa in 2007 and the Hungarian cup for a third time in 2008. In August 2008 he left to join Heart of Midlothian.

=== Hearts ===
Balogh signed for Hearts on an initial six-month loan in August 2008, where he was expected to compete with Marian Kello and Jamie MacDonald for a place in the starting line-up. On 19 October 2008 he made his debut as a half time replacement for the injured Marian Kello in an Edinburgh derby at Easter Road. The match ended 1–1 with Balogh making a crucial save to deny Derek Riordan a winning goal in the dying minutes. He signed for the Jambos on a permanent deal on 2 February 2009 from Debreceni VSC for a fee of £185,000. After spending the early part of his career battling Kello for a place in the first-team he eventually lost out to the Slovak and spent much of his time on the bench and with the emergence of Jamie MacDonald he slipped to third-choice, making only one appearance in the 2011–12 season. As his contract with the club was set to expire in January 2012 he was widely expected to depart Tynecastle in the new year, however on 7 December 2011 he left the club early by agreeing to terminate his contract. He left having made 41 appearances in all competitions for Hearts and described his performances in Edinburgh derbies as personal highlights.

== International career ==
Balogh made his debut for the Hungary national team on 12 September 2007, in Istanbul against Turkey.

(Statistics correct as of 20 July 2009)

National Team Performance
Team	Year	Friendlies		International Competition		Total
Team	Year	App	Goals	App	Goals	App	Goals
Hungary	2007	0	0	1	0	1	0
Total		0	0	1	0	1	0

== International matches ==
International Matches
#	Date	Venue	Opponent	Result	Competition
1	12 September 2007	Istanbul	Turkey	0–3	UEFA Euro 2008 Qual.

== Honours ==
Debreceni VSC

- Hungarian League: 2007
- Magyar Kupa: 2001, 2008
  - Runners-up: 2003, 2007
- Szuperkupa: 2007
  - Runner-up: 2008
- Hungarian Liga Cup: Runner-up 2008

FC Sopron

- Magyar Kupa: 2005
