= Péter Máté (footballer, born 1984) =

Hungarian footballer

Personal information
- Date of birth: 2 December 1984 (age 41)
- Place of birth: Püspökladány, Hungary
- Height: 6 ft 5 in (1.96 m)
- Position: Defender

Youth career
- Tünet
- Debrecen

Senior career*
Years	Team	Apps	(Gls)
2000–2016	Debrecen	138	(12)
2010–2012	Debrecen B	5	(0)
2004–2005	→ Diósgyőr (loan)	26	(3)
2006–2007	→ Reading (loan)	0	(0)
2011	→ Szolnok (loan)	13	(0)
2016–2018	Nyíregyháza Spartacus	9	(0)
2018–2019	Debreceni EAC		
Total		191	(15)

International career^{‡}
2004–2006	Hungary U21	11	(1)

Managerial career
- 2026–: Mezőkövesd
- * Club domestic league appearances and goals as of 1 May 2016 ‡ National team caps and goals as of 16 August 2009

Péter Máté (Hungarian pronunciation: [ˈpeːtɛr ˈmaːteː]; born 2 December 1984) is a Hungarian football manager and former professional player who is currently the manager of Nemzeti Bajnokság II club Mezőkövesd.

== Club career ==
Máté was born in Püspökladány, Hungary and started his career at his local football club, Tünet SE. His talents were spotted by the scouts of Debreceni Focisuli, where he spent the rest of his youth career.

He started football at senior level at Debreceni VSC, where he played two league matches in his first season, and one in his second. In his third season, he played 11 matches scoring one goal. Since he had few opportunities to play at senior level in 2004, he was sent on loan to Miskolc to play for Diósgyőri VTK. There he played 26 matches scoring two goals. This performance was good enough to convince the Debrecen board and coaching staff, so at the end of the season he returned to Debrecen. In the 2005–06 season, he played 25 matches scoring five goals, a good return for a centre back.

Máté started the 2006–07 season at Debrecen, but the club received an offer from FA Premier League club Reading, and loaned him out on a season-long loan, making his debut and scoring a header against Darlington in the League Cup. However, Máté had little opportunity to impress on the pitch due to a serious injury he suffered in a reserve match against Chelsea. Reading agreed to fund his rehabilitation, and on 4 May 2007 Máté's loan was extended to the end of 2007.

On 26 August 2010, Máté came on as a last-minute substitute in the 2:1 away win against Bulgarian side Litex Lovech in a UEFA Europa League game. Subsequently, the team from Lovech launched an official complaint, demanding a 3:0 win by default, as Máté had not been entered on the official squad list of the Hungarian team prior to the game. However, UEFA decided against changing the result of the match, settling for a fine of €15,000 to be paid by the Hungarians.

== Managerial career ==
On 18 June 2026, Máté was announced as new manager of Nemzeti Bajnokság II club Mezőkövesd, taking over from Aurél Csertői.

== Career statistics ==
Appearances and goals by club, season and competition
Club	Season	League		Cup		League Cup		Europe		Total	
Club	Season	Apps	Goals	Apps	Goals	Apps	Goals	Apps	Goals	Apps	Goals
Debrecen
Debrecen	2000–01	2	0	0	0	0	0	0	0	2	0
Debrecen	2001–02	1	0	0	0	0	0	0	0	1	0
Debrecen	2002–03	11	1	1	0	0	0	0	0	12	1
Debrecen	2005–06	25	5	0	0	0	0	3	0	28	5
Debrecen	2006–07	0	0	0	0	0	0	1	0	1	0
Debrecen	2007–08	7	0	1	0	1	0	0	0	9	0
Debrecen	2008–09	0	0	0	0	1	0	0	0	1	0
Debrecen	2009–10	1	0	0	0	0	0	3	0	4	0
Debrecen	2010–11	1	0	2	0	0	0	1	0	4	0
Debrecen	2011–12	10	0	5	0	9	0	0	0	24	0
Debrecen	2012–13	11	0	3	0	1	0	4	0	19	0
Debrecen	2013–14	22	2	3	1	0	0	2	0	27	3
Debrecen	2014–15	13	1	0	0	2	0	6	0	21	1
Debrecen	Total	104	9	15	1	14	0	20	0	153	10
Diósgyőr
Diósgyőr	2004–05	26	3	1	0	0	0	0	0	27	3
Diósgyőr	Total	26	3	1	0	0	0	0	0	27	3
Reading
Reading	2006–07	0	0	0	0	1	1	0	0	1	1
Reading	Total	0	0	0	0	1	1	0	0	1	1
Szolnok
Szolnok	2010–11	13	0	0	0	0	0	0	0	13	0
Szolnok	Total	13	0	0	0	0	0	0	0	13	0
Career total		143	12	16	1	15	1	20	0	194	14

Updated to games played as of 7 December 2014.

== International career ==
Máté has been capped by both the Hungary U21 and senior Hungary teams.
