= Ronald Habi =

Croatian footballer

Personal information
- Date of birth: 23 August 1977 (age 49)
- Place of birth: Kneževo, SFR Yugoslavia
- Height: 1.79 m (5 ft 10 in)
- Position: Midfielder

Youth career
- 1983–1996: Jadran Šećerana

Senior career*
Years	Team	Apps	(Gls)
1996–1998	Kikinda	55	(0)
1998–2002	Vojvodina	80	(0)
2002–2007	Debrecen	75	(1)
2007–2010	Újpest	27	(0)
2008–2009	→ BFC Siófok (loan)	4	(0)
2009	→ Báránd KSE (loan)		
2009–2010	SNK Lug	47	(5)
2010–2012	Hajdúszoboszlói	47	(5)

International career
1996–1998	Croatia U21	0	(0)
- * Club domestic league appearances and goals

Ronald Habi (born 23 August 1977) is a Croatian former professional footballer who played as a midfielder.

== Club career ==
Habi was born in Kneževo, Popovac, SR Croatia, then within SFR Yugoslavia, in a family of Hungarian minority. He started his early career in Croatia and then in Serbia.

In 2002 he moved to Hungary where he spent the rest of his career playing with Debreceni VSC, Újpest FC, BFC Siófok, Báránd KSE, SNK Lug and Hajdúszoboszlói SE.

Habi received Hungarian nationality after moving to the country in 2002.

== Honours ==
Debrecen

- Szuperkupa: 2006
