= Csaba Bernáth =

Hungarian footballer

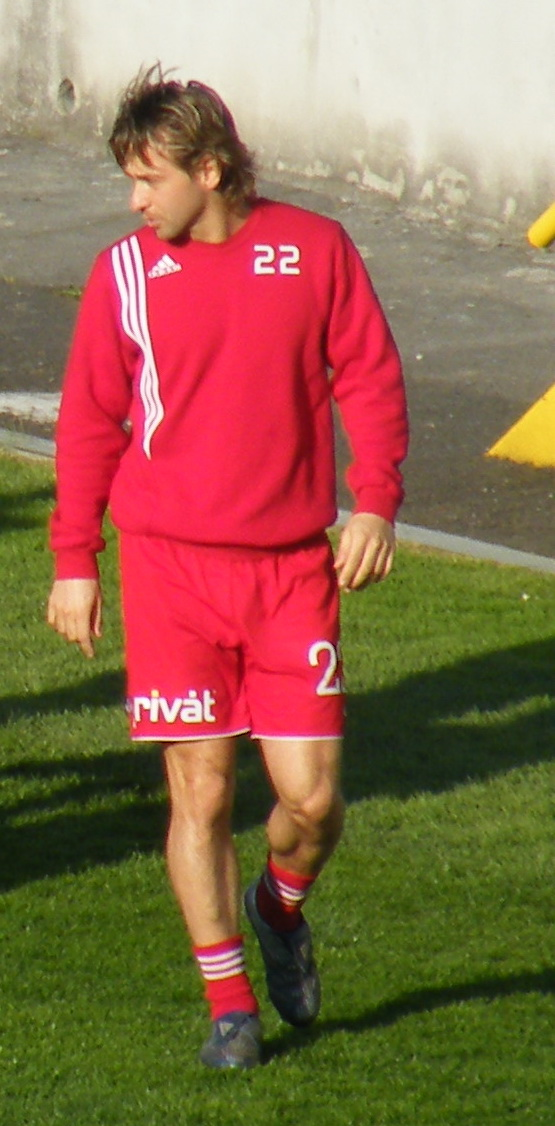

Personal information
- Full name: Csaba Bernáth
- Date of birth: 26 March 1979 (age 47)
- Place of birth: Debrecen, Hungary
- Height: 1.77 m (5 ft 10 in)
- Position: Right back

Senior career*
| Years | Team | Apps | (Gls) |
| 1996–2003 | Debrecen | 143 | (1) |
| 1999 | → Hajdúszoboszló (loan) | 22 | (7) |
| 2003 | Royal Antwerp | 9 | (0) |
| 2004–2013 | Debrecen | 156 | (1) |

International career
| 1996–1997 | Hungary U-18 | 6 | (0) |
| 1998–2000 | Hungary U-21 | 6 | (0) |
- * Club domestic league appearances and goals as of 1 December 2013

Csaba Bernáth (Hungarian pronunciation: [ˈt͡ʃɒbɒ ˈbɛrnaːt]; born 26 March 1979) in Debrecen is a Hungarian footballer who currently plays for Debreceni VSC.

== Honours ==
Debreceni VSC

- Nemzeti Bajnokság I: 2005, 2006, 2007, 2009,2010, 2012
- Magyar Kupa: 1999, 2001, 2008, 2012
- Szuperkupa: 2005, 2006, 2007, 2009
