= Norbert Csernyánszki =

Hungarian footballer

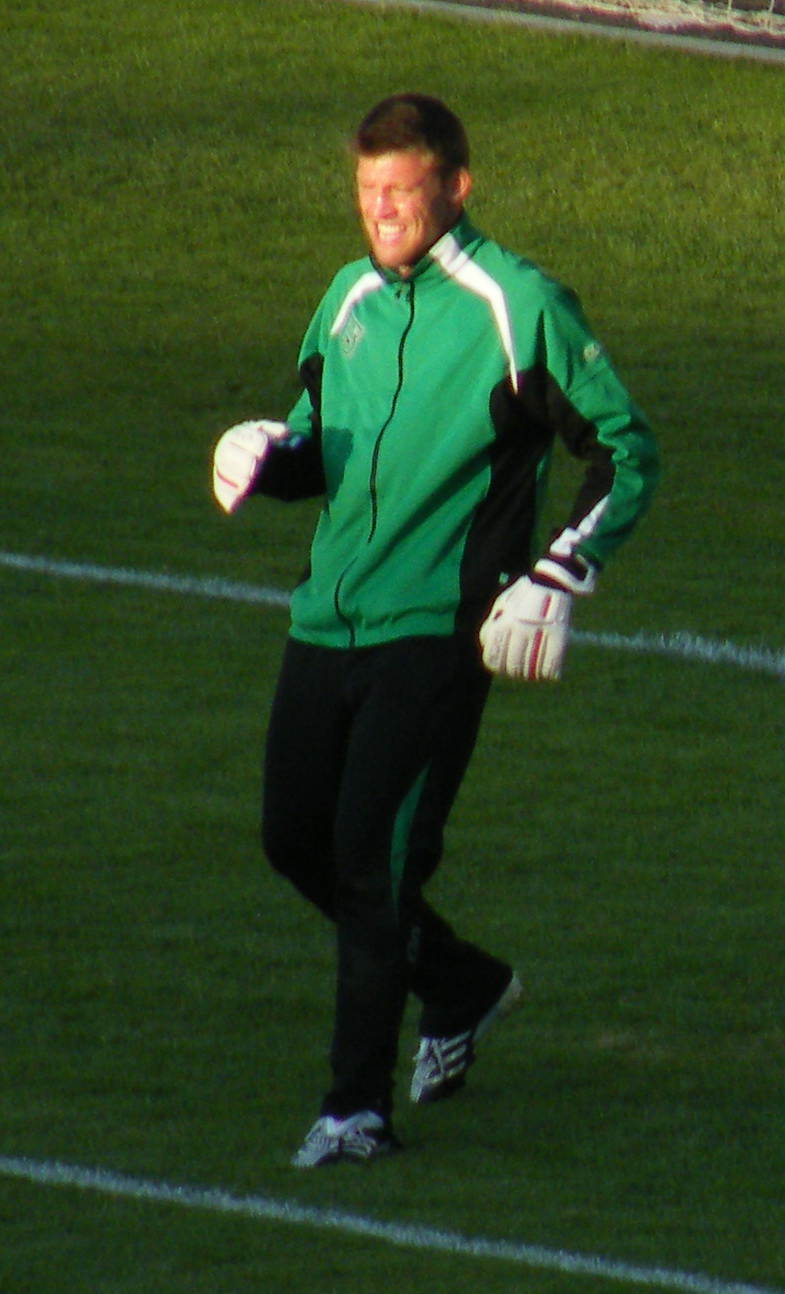

Personal information
- Full name: Norbert Csernyánszki
- Date of birth: 1 February 1976 (age 50)
- Place of birth: Veszprém, Hungary
- Height: 1.88 m (6 ft 2 in)
- Position: Goalkeeper

Senior career*
| Years | Team | Apps | (Gls) |
| 1994–1997 | Balatonfüred | 16 | (0) |
| 1997–1999 | Veszprém | 2 | (0) |
| 1999–2000 | Gázszer | 0 | (0) |
| 2002–2004 | Siófok | 41 | (0) |
| 2004–2009 | Debrecen | 80 | (0) |
| 2009–2016 | Paks | 116 | (0) |
- * Club domestic league appearances and goals

Norbert Csernyánszki (born 1 February 1976 in Veszprém) is a retired Hungarian football player.

== Honours ==
- Hungarian League: 2004–05, 2005–06, 2006–07
- Named in the Hungarian National Championship I all-star team (nemzetisport.hu): 2010–11
