= Ádám Komlósi =

Hungarian footballer

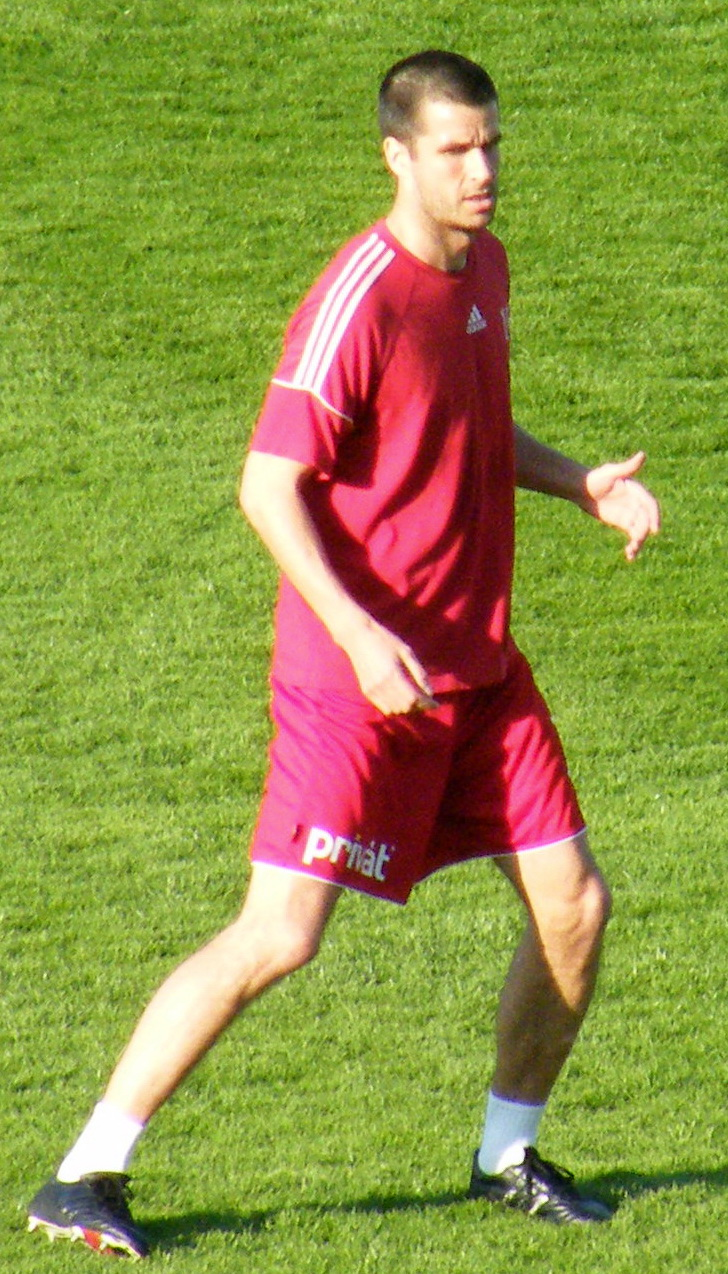

Personal information
- Full name: Ádám Komlósi
- Date of birth: 6 December 1977 (age 48)
- Place of birth: Budapest, Hungary
- Height: 1.90 m (6 ft 3 in)
- Position: Centre back

Senior career*
Years	Team	Apps	(Gls)
1994–1995	Kazincbarcikai SC	23	(0)
1995–1998	BVSC Budapest	87	(0)
1998–2004	MTK Hungaria FC	129	(0)
2004–2011	Debreceni VSC	132	(4)
Total		371	(4)

International career^{‡}
1996–1997	Hungary U-19	9	(0)
1996–1999	Hungary U-21	7	(0)
2004–2010	Hungary	10	(0)
- * Club domestic league appearances and goals as of 22 May 2011 ‡ National team caps and goals as of 11 August 2010

Ádám Komlósi (Hungarian pronunciation: [ˈaːdaːm ˈkomloːʃi]; born 6 December 1977 in Budapest) is a Hungarian football player who currently plays for Debreceni VSC.

== Club career ==
In 2002/03, he won the Hungarian championship for the first time with MTK Hungaria FC.

After a disappointing 6th-place finish in the Hungarian championship in 2003/04, he moved on to Debreceni VSC who finished 3rd in that season.

In July 2004, he spent time on trial at English club Wigan Athletic.

Since his move to the Debrecen side, Ádám won 3 Hungarian championship in a row from 2005 to 2007.

== International career ==
In season 2003/04, he was called up by Lothar Matthäus in the Hungarian national squad.

Komlósi made his debut on 18 February 2004, in Paphos against Armenia.

After Mathaeus departure, Péter Bozsik became the head coach of the national team and Ádám Komlósi was again selected to play in international friendlies matches against New Zealand and England. However, in the second match Ádám Komlósi was injured and replaced by Vilmos Vanczák and since then was much less present with the national side.

== Career statistics ==
(Statistics correct as of 16 August 2009)

National Team Performance
Team	Year	Friendlies		International Competition		Total	
Team	Year	App	Goals	App	Goals	App	Goals
Hungary	2010	1	0	0	0	1	0
Hungary	2006	1	0	1	0	2	0
Hungary	2005	0	0	1	0	1	0
Hungary	2004	6	0	0	0	6	0
Total		8	0	2	0	10	0
