= Ibrahima Sidibe =

Senegalese footballer

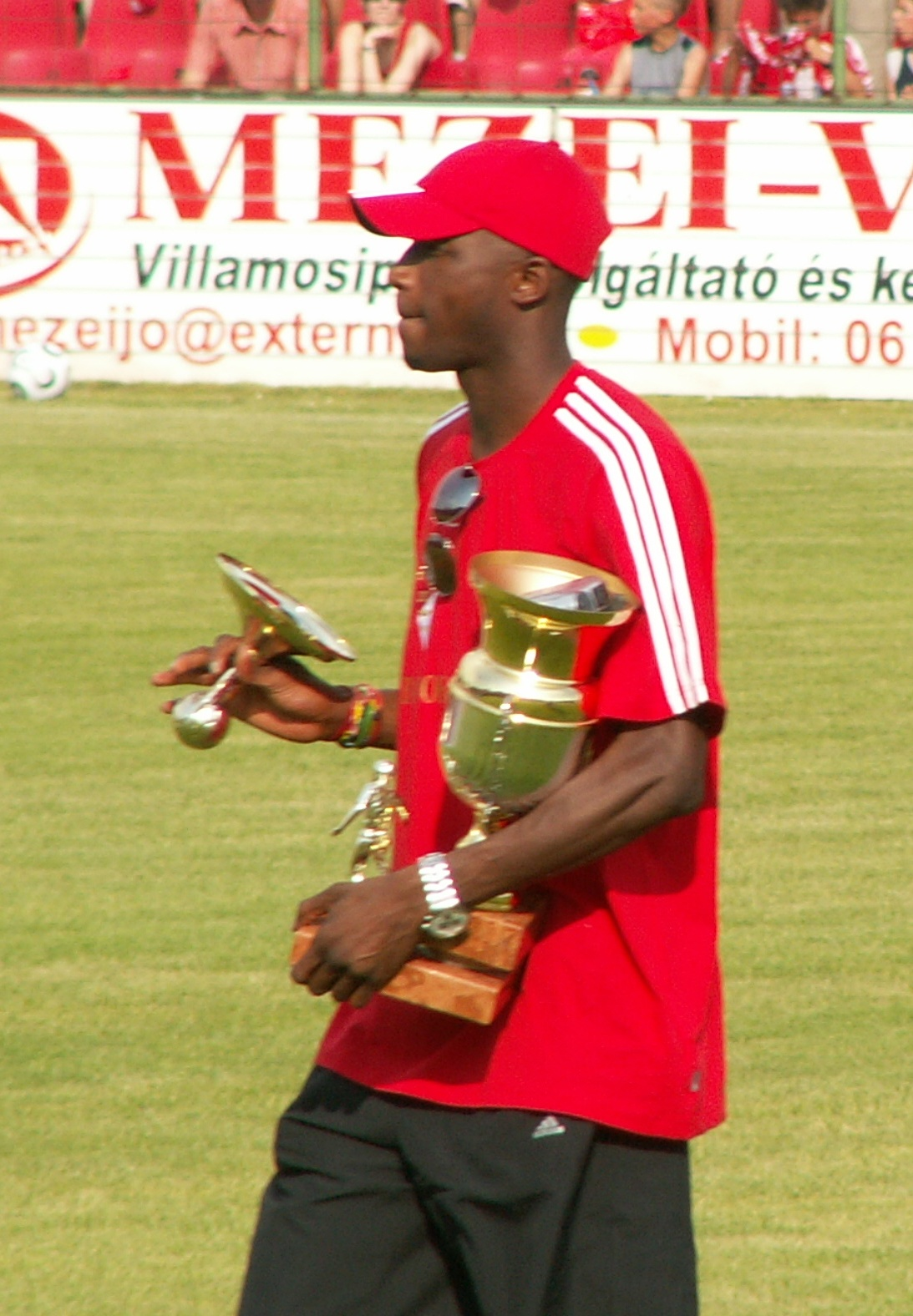

Personal information
- Full name: Ibrahima Sidibe
- Date of birth: 10 August 1980 (age 46)
- Place of birth: Nguidile, Senegal
- Height: 1.93 m (6 ft 4 in)
- Position: Striker

Team information
- Current team: Sporting Hasselt
- Number: 20

Senior career*
Years	Team	Apps	(Gls)
1997–1999	Sfaxien	22	(6)
1999–2000	Bahlingen	28	(15)
2000–2001	WSG Wattens	30	(11)
2001–2002	FC Tirol	8	(1)
2002	Pasching	14	(8)
2002–2005	Ried	94	(16)
2005–2007	Debrecen	69	(32)
2008–2011	Sint-Truiden	113	(41)
2011–2012	Beerschot	18	(6)
2012	Westerlo	12	(3)
2012–2016	Debrecen	92	(27)
2016–2017	Sporting Hasselt	27	(5)

International career
2006–2007	Senegal	2	(0)
- * Club domestic league appearances and goals as of 7 May 2017 (UTC)

Ibrahim Sidibe (born 10 August 1980) is a Senegalese former professional footballer who played as a striker.

== Club career ==
=== Debrecen ===
In the summer of 2005 Ibrahim signed a contract with Debreceni VSC. He scored 15 goals in 28 matches during his first season, whilst in his second he scored 17 goals in 27 matches. That makes him 2 times to topscorer of the Hungarian top football league. In his third season he did not extend his contract, played 14 matches and he had to play as a leftback. As a result of that, he was not selected in the squad for the 2008 Africa Cup of Nations in Ghana.

In January 2008, Sidibe moved to Sint-Truiden where he became a success, scoring many goals and helping the club promoting to the highest level in Belgian football. The following season, he played a fantastic season with Sint-Truidense, and fought for European football with Sint-Truidense, but ultimately Racing Genk was proven to be too big a mouthful.

In May 2011, Sidibe signed a three-year contract with Beerschot before departing from Sint-Truiden in July the same year.

=== Debreceni EAC ===
On 11 April 2018 he was signed by Nemzeti Bajnokság III club, Debreceni EAC.

== Honours ==
- Hungarian League (2):
  - 2005–06, 2006–07
- Individual:
  - Zilahi Prize: 2007
