= Sandro Tomić =

Croatian football goalkeeper (born 1972)

Personal information
- Full name: Sandro Tomić
- Date of birth: 29 October 1972 (age 54)
- Place of birth: Split, SR Croatia, Yugoslavia
- Height: 1.84 m (6 ft 1/2 in)
- Position: Goalkeeper

Youth career
- NK Primorac

Senior career*
Years	Team	Apps	(Gls)
1993–1994	Primorac Stobreč	34	(0)
1994–1995	Hajduk Split	2	(0)
1995–1996	Istra	26	(0)
1996–2002	NK Zagreb	92	(0)
2002–2006	Debrecen	64	(0)
2007	Honvéd Budapest	12	(0)
2008	PAS Hamedan	21	(0)
2008–2009	Imotski	23	(0)
2009–2010	Nea Salamis	0	(0)
Total		274	(0)

Managerial career
- 2016–2017: Karabükspor (goalkeeping coach)
- 2017–2018: Galatasaray (goalkeeping coach)
- 2019–2020: Turkmenistan (goalkeeping coach)
- * Club domestic league appearances and goals

Sandro Tomić (born 29 October 1972 in Split) is a Croatian former football goalkeeper and currently the goalkeeping coach. Tomić previously played for Hajduk Split and NK Zagreb in the Prva HNL. He was a member of the 1995 Hajduk team which became Croatian champions, as well as becoming Hungarian champion with Debrecen in 2005 and 2006, with two supercups, while with Honvéd he won the Hungarian Cup.

On 21 August 2007 Tomić signed a contract with newly formed Iranian side PAS Hamedan F.C.

He was supposed to play for Croatia in World Cup 1998. He was already on the list of Miroslav Blažević, but Tomić injured his shoulder before the championship.

Sandro Tomić never made it to play in Hajduk's first team like basic goalkeeper, but he played around 14 official games for Hajduk, since he was playing at the same time when Tonći Gabrić and Zoran Slavica were Hajduk's goalkeepers.

His son Fabjan Tomić is also goalkeeper of Hajduk Split.

== Managerial career ==
In March 2019, the Football Federation of Turkmenistan named Tomiç as the goalkeeper coach of the Turkmenistan national football team. The contract is signed for 1 year. Croatian specialist Sandro Tomic will help Ante Miše in the national team of Turkmenistan. Croatian coaches are set to develop the overall football in Turkmenistan, not just the national team.

In March 2020, due to the expiration of the contract and the postponement of the matches of the 2022 FIFA World Cup qualification in Asia, he left Turkmenistan alongside head coach Ante Miše. The national team of Turkmenistan, playing in the qualifying tournament of the World Cup 2022, has occupied first place in the group at the time of his departure.
