= Zoltán Kiss (footballer, born 1980) =

Hungarian footballer

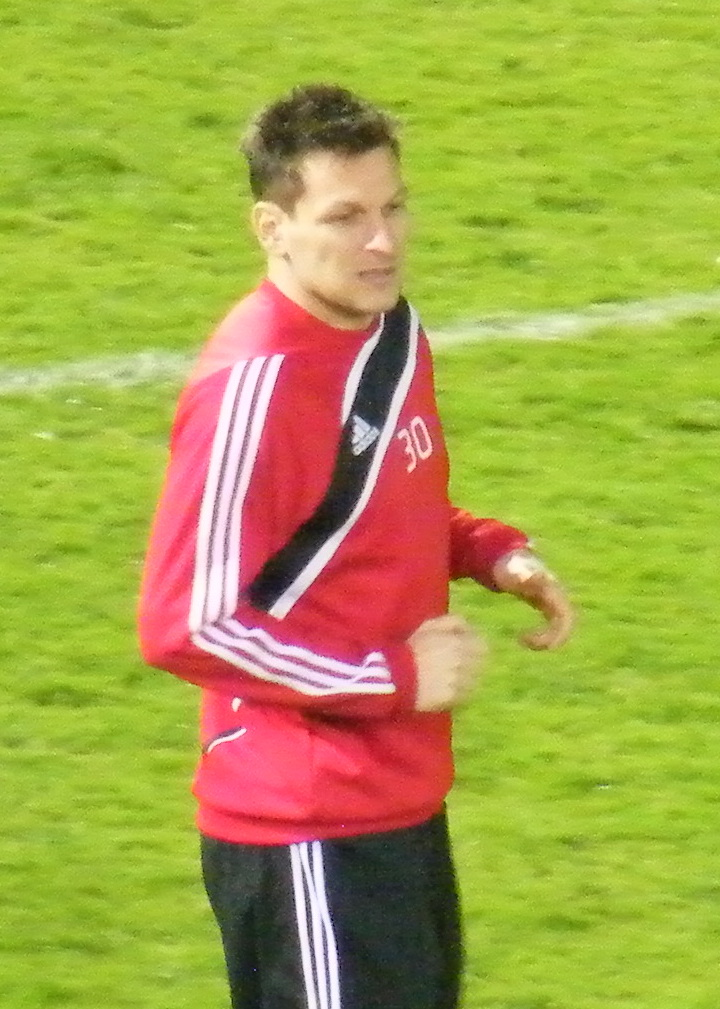

Personal information
- Date of birth: 18 August 1980 (age 46)
- Place of birth: Püspökladány, Hungary
- Height: 1.82 m (6 ft 0 in)
- Position: Centre midfielder

Senior career*
| Years | Team | Apps | (Gls) |
| 1997–1999 | Debrecen | 12 | (2) |
| 1999–2001 | Beerschot | | |
| 2001–2011 | Debrecen | 211 | (18) |
| 2011 | Panserraikos | 8 | (0) |

International career
| 1996–1997 | Hungary U-16 | 15 | (7) |
| 1998–1999 | Hungary U-18 | 2 | (0) |
| 2004–2006 | Hungary | 5 | (0) |
- * Club domestic league appearances and goals

Zoltán Kiss (Hungarian pronunciation: [ˈzoltaːn ˈkiʃ]; born 18 August 1980) is a Hungarian former football player.

He started playing football at the age of 7 and he was offered to DVSC where he went on step by step through the different age groups scoring some goals as he was played up front at the time. Later on, he went to Bocskai to return to DVSC from there. Herczeg András sent him on against Újpest in 1997 during his first reign at Debrecen. The 17-year-old scored his first goal on his second game for the club. Although a member of the team he got free transferred in 1999 because of the financial trouble at the club. He was signed by Belgian club Beerschot Antwerp to spend 2 years in the Belgian first division. He returned to Loki in 2001 to be part of the championship campaign in 2005. Three times champion and two times Hungarian Cup winner and counts five international caps under Lothar Mattheus and Péter Bozsik. Different DVSC managers have played him in different positions but none of them could imagine the starting eleven without the enthusiastic midfielder. And though he feels most comfortable on the right hand side of the pitch he now runs the team from deep as a defending midfielder lately.

He moved to Panserraikos in January 2011 on a free transfer after his contract ran out at Debrecen.

== National team ==
Kiss made his debut on 25 April 2004, in Zalaegerszeg against Japan.

(Statistics correct as of 16 August 2009)

National Team Performance
| Team | Year | Friendlies | | International Competition | | Total | |
| Team | Year | App | Goals | App | Goals | App | Goals |
|---|---|---|---|---|---|---|---|
| Hungary | 2006 | 1 | 0 | 3 | 0 | 4 | 0 |
| Hungary | 2004 | 1 | 0 | 0 | 0 | 1 | 0 |
| Total | | 2 | 0 | 3 | 0 | 5 | 0 |

== International matches ==
International matches
| # | Date | Venue | Opponent | Result | Competition |
|---|---|---|---|---|---|
| 1 | 25 April 2004 | Zalaegerszeg | Japan | 3–2 | Friendly |
| 2 | 16 August 2006 | Graz | Austria | 2–1 | Friendly |
| 3 | 2 September 2006 | Budapest | Norway | 1–4 | FIFA World Cup 2006 Qual. |
| 4 | 6 September 2006 | Zenica | Bosnia and Herzegovina | 3–1 | FIFA World Cup 2006 Qual. |
| 5 | 10 October 2006 | Valletta | Malta | 1–2 | FIFA World Cup 2006 Qual. |
