= Aladár Virág =

Hungarian footballer

Personal information
- Full name: Aladár Virág
- Date of birth: 19 February 1983 (age 43)
- Place of birth: Debrecen, Hungary
- Height: 1.80 m (5 ft 11 in)
- Position: Midfielder

Team information
- Current team: Balmazújváros
- Number: 30

Youth career
- 1997–2000: Debrecen
- 2000–2002: Diósgyőr
- 2002–2004: Nyíregyháza

Senior career*
Years	Team	Apps	(Gls)
2004–2005	Diósgyőr	27	(1)
2005–2007	Debrecen	0	(0)
2005–2006	→ Nyíregyháza (loan)	8	(1)
2006–2007	→ Győr (loan)	16	(2)
2007–2008	Rákospalota	11	(0)
2008	Diósgyőr	10	(1)
2008	Atromitos Yeroskipou	12	(1)
2009–2012	Anagennisi Dherynia	9	(0)
2012–	Balmazújváros	137	(16)
- * Club domestic league appearances and goals as of 12 August 2017

Aladár Virág (born 19 February 1983 in Debrecen) is a Hungarian football player who played for Balmazújvárosi FC.
