= Csaba Szatmári (footballer, born 1973) =

Hungarian footballer

Personal information
- Full name: Csaba Szatmári
- Date of birth: 2 November 1973 (age 52)
- Place of birth: Debrecen, Hungary
- Height: 1.80 m (5 ft 11 in)
- Position: Defender

Team information
- Current team: Tiszaújváros

Youth career
- 1987–1990: Ebes FC
- 1990–1991: Debreceni MTE
- 1991–1993: Dorogi Bányász

Senior career*
Years	Team	Apps	(Gls)
1993–2002	Debreceni VSC	224	(9)
2002–2003	Nyíregyháza Spartacus	16	(0)
2003–2008	Debreceni VSC	71	(1)

International career
1996	Hungary U23	2	(0)
- * Club domestic league appearances and goals

Csaba Szatmári (born 2 November 1973 in Debrecen) is a Hungarian football player who currently plays for Tiszaújváros.

In the 1996 Summer Olympics, he was a member of the Hungarian squad which was eliminated in the first round of the competition.

Despite a successful club career at Debrecen VSC, Szatmári never managed to feature in the national team since the 1996 Olympics.
