= 2006–07 Nemzeti Bajnokság I =

Nemzeti Bajnokság I
- Season: 2006–07
- Dates: 28 July 2006 – 28 May 2007
- Champions: Debrecen
- Relegated: Pécs; Dunakanyar-Vác
- Champions League: Debrecen
- UEFA Cup: MTK; Honvéd
- Intertoto Cup: Zalaegerszeg
- Matches: 240
- Goals: 677 (2.82 per match)
- Top goalscorer: Péter Bajzát (18)
- Biggest home win: Honvéd 6–0 Dunakanyar-Vác
- Biggest away win: Sopron 1–6 Debrecen
- Highest scoring: Tatabánya 5–3 Diósgyőr; Fehérvár 5–3 MTK

The 2006–07 Nemzeti Bajnokság I, also known as NB I, was the 105th season of top-tier football in Hungary. The league was officially named Borsodi Liga for sponsoring reasons. The season started on 28 July 2006 and ended on 28 May 2007.

Debreceni VSC won their third national championship, and became the first team outside of Budapest to complete a three-peat. The club started off the season with coach Attila Supka, who resigned after the club failed to qualify for the Champions League. The team finished off the remainder of the season under Miroslav Beranek, and ended up winning the league eight points clear of MTK. Debrecen's title was confirmed on the 14th of May, upon overcoming Rákospalotai EAC 4-1.

== League standings ==
Pos	Team	Pld	W	D	L	GF	GA	GD	Pts	Qualification or relegation
1	Debrecen (C)	30	22	3	5	63	21	+42	69	Qualification for the Champions League second qualifying round
2	MTK	30	19	4	7	61	33	+28	61	Qualification for the UEFA Cup first qualifying round
3	Zalaegerszeg	30	17	4	9	54	38	+16	55	Qualification for the Intertoto Cup second round
4	Újpest	30	15	4	11	39	32	+7	46 (Note: Újpest were deducted three points due to federation decision.)	
5	Vasas	30	13	6	11	43	41	+2	45	
6	Fehérvár	30	13	5	12	45	43	+2	44	
7	Kaposvár	30	12	5	13	40	36	+4	41	
8	Honvéd	30	11	8	11	48	43	+5	41	Qualification for the UEFA Cup first qualifying round (Note: Honvéd qualified for the UEFA Cup first qualifying round as the 2006–07 Magyar Kupa winners.)
9	Diósgyőr	30	11	5	14	40	52	−12	38	
10	Sopron	30	11	4	15	33	46	−13	37	
11	Paks	30	10	7	13	34	38	−4	37	
12	Tatabánya	30	11	3	16	46	58	−12	36	
13	Győr	30	9	8	13	37	43	−6	35	
14	Rákospalota	30	9	7	14	42	55	−13	34	
15	Pécs (R)	30	7	12	11	31	41	−10	33	Relegation to Nemzeti Bajnokság II
16	Dunakanyar-Vác (R)	30	4	7	19	21	57	−36	19	Relegation to Nemzeti Bajnokság II

Source: soccerway.com
(C) Champions; (R) Relegated

== Results ==
Home \ Away	DEB	DIÓ	DVA	FEH	GYŐ	HON	KAP	MTK	PAK	PÉC	RÁK	SOP	TAT	UTE	VAS	ZTE
Debrecen		1–1	4–0	3–1	3–0	2–1	1–0	3–0	1–0	2–1	4–1	2–1	2–0	0–2	3–0	3–1
Diósgyőr	1–5		1–0	2–1	4–3	2–1	1–1	0–1	2–1	1–3	1–0	0–2	3–1	1–0	1–2	1–4
Dunakanyar-Vác	1–3	1–0		0–2	0–0	3–1	0–1	2–3	0–2	1–1	0–1	1–2	2–2	3–1	0–1	0–5
Fehérvár	0–4	2–0	1–0		2–1	1–0	1–2	5–3	1–1	2–2	2–2	3–0	2–0	3–2	2–0	2–3
Győr	0–0	4–0	1–0	2–0		2–0	3–1	3–4	2–1	0–0	2–2	2–0	0–0	0–3	0–2	2–1
Honvéd	2–1	1–1	6–0	1–1	4–1		2–2	2–1	0–0	0–1	2–1	2–0	2–0	1–1	0–1	1–2
Kaposvár	1–2	1–2	3–0	1–0	2–1	1–2		1–0	2–0	1–2	3–1	2–2	4–0	1–0	0–1	3–1
MTK	1–0	4–2	3–0	0–1	1–0	2–2	2–0		1–0	0–0	4–0	4–1	4–0	2–0	2–2	2–0
Paks	0–0	2–1	0–0	0–2	2–2	1–2	1–0	3–1		0–1	1–1	1–0	0–1	1–1	4–2	2–0
Pécs	0–2	1–0	1–1	2–0	0–0	1–1	2–3	0–1	0–2		2–2	0–0	3–3	0–1	2–1	1–1
Rákospalota	1–3	0–2	4–0	2–0	2–0	3–4	1–1	0–0	4–3	1–0		1–3	2–4	1–2	1–3	2–1
Sopron	1–6	1–0	3–1	2–1	0–1	1–1	1–0	0–3	1–3	3–1	2–3		1–0	0–2	1–0	1–2
Tatabánya	2–1	5–3	1–2	3–2	2–1	1–2	4–2	2–4	3–0	4–0	2–3	2–0		3–2	1–3	0–3
Újpest	2–0	0–3	1–0	0–2	2–0	4–2	0–0	2–3	3–2	1–0	0–0	1–0	2–0		2–0	0–1
Vasas	0–1	2–2	2–2	2–2	3–2	3–1	1–0	1–5	0–1	3–3	1–0	0–0	2–0	1–2		4–0
Zalaegerszeg	0–1	2–2	1–1	2–1	2–2	3–2	2–1	1–0	4–0	4–1	3–0	1–3	1–0	2–0	1–0	

Source: soccerway.com
Legend: Blue = home team win; Yellow = draw; Red = away team win.

== Statistical leaders ==
=== Top goalscorers ===
Rank	Scorer	Club	Goals
1	(Hungary) Péter Bajzát	Győri ETO FC	18
2	(Senegal) Ibrahim Sidibe	Debreceni VSC	17
3	(Hungary) József Kanta	MTK Budapest FC	16
4	(Hungary) Gábor Torma	Rákospalotai EAC	15
5	(Hungary) Róbert Waltner	Zalaegerszegi TE	13
5	(Hungary) Tibor Tisza	Újpest FC	13
7	(Hungary) Krisztián Németh	MTK Budapest FC	12
7	(Cameroon) Dorge Kouemaha	Tatabánya FC	12
7	(Hungary) Lóránt Oláh	Kaposvári Rákóczi	12
10	(Hungary) Ádám Hrepka	MTK Budapest FC	11
10	(Hungary) Róbert Feczesin	FC Sopron	11

== Attendances ==
#	Club	Average
1	Debrecen	7,567
2	Zalaegerszeg	5,520
3	Diósgyőr	4,267
4	Újpest	3,053
5	Győr	2,673
6	Kaposvár	2,520
7	Budapest Honvéd	2,440
8	Sopron	2,335
9	Paks	2,133
10	Vasas	2,073
11	Tatabánya	2,067
12	Videoton	1,946
13	MTK	1,453
14	Pécs	1,420
15	Vác	1,420
16	Rákospalota	1,200
