= Szuperkupa =

Magyar Szuperkupa
- Founded: 1992
- Abolished: 2016
- Region: Hungary
- Teams: 2
- Last champions: Ferencváros (6th title)
- Most championships: Ferencváros (6 titles)
- Broadcaster: Magyar Televízió

The Hungarian Super Cup is an annual association football match between the League (Nemzeti Bajnokság I) champions and the Cup (Magyar Kupa) winners.

== Winners ==
Key
†	Nemzeti Bajnokság I Champions
*	Magyar Kupa Winners
‡	Nemzeti Bajnokság I Runners-up
D	Holders of League and Cup Double
NH	Not Held due to heavy schedule of the clubs

Edition	Winners			Finalists	Results
1992	Újpest FC	*	†	Ferencváros	3–1
1993	Ferencváros	*	†	Budapest Honvéd	2–1
1994	Ferencváros	*	†	Vác	2–1
1995	Ferencváros	D			
1996	Ferencváros	NH	NH	Budapest Honvéd	
1997	MTK Budapest	D			
1998	Újpest FC	NH*	NH*	MTK Budapest	
1999	MTK Budapest	NH	NH	Debrecen	
2000	Dunaújváros FC	NH	NH	MTK Budapest	
2001	Ferencváros	NH	NH	Debrecen	
2002	Újpest FC	*	†	Zalaegerszeg	3–1
2003	MTK Budapest	†	*	Ferencváros	2–0
2004	Ferencváros	D			
2005	Debrecen	†	*	FC Sopron	2–4 Away 3–0 Home
2006	Debrecen	†	*	Videoton	1–0 Away 2–1 Home
2007	Debrecen	†	*	Budapest Honvéd	1–1 Away 3–0 Home
2008	MTK Budapest	†	*	Debrecen	0–0 (3–2 pen.)
2009	Debrecen	†	*	Budapest Honvéd	1–0
2010	Debrecen	†	‡	Videoton	1–0
2011	Videoton	†	*	Kecskeméti TE	1–0
2012	Videoton	‡	†	Debrecen	1–1 (5–3 pen.)
2013	Győri	†	*	Debrecen	3–0
2014	Újpest FC	*	†	Debrecen	0–0 (5–4 pen.)
2015	Ferencváros	*	†	Videoton	3–0
2016	Ferencváros	D			

(*) due to violent incidents during the recent 1997–98 Magyar Kupa Final between MTK Budapest FC and Újpest FC.

== Performances ==
=== Performances by club ===
Club	Winners	Finalists	Winning editions	Runners-up editions
Ferencváros	6	2	1993, 1994, 1995, 2004, 2015, 2016	1992, 2003
Debrecen	5	4	2005, 2006, 2007, 2009, 2010	2008, 2012, 2013, 2014
Újpest FC	3	—	1992, 2002, 2014	—
MTK Budapest	3	—	1997, 2003, 2008	—
Videoton	2	3	2011, 2012	2006, 2010, 2015
Győri	1	—	2013	—
Budapest Honvéd	—	3	—	1993, 2007, 2009
Kecskeméti TE	—	1	—	2011
FC Sopron	—	1	—	2005
Vác	—	1	—	1994
Zalaegerszeg	—	1	—	2002

== See also ==
Magyar Kupa
