= 2011–12 Debreceni VSC season =

Debreceni VSC
2011–12 season
- Chairman: (Hungary) Gábor Szima
- Manager: (Hungary) Elemér Kondás
- NB 1: Winner
- Hungarian Cup: Winner
- Hungarian League Cup: Semi-final
- Top goalscorer: League: (France) (Senegal) Adamo Coulibaly (20); All: (France) (Senegal) Adamo Coulibaly (22)
- Highest home attendance: 10,400 v Pécs (12 May 2012)
- Lowest home attendance: 500 v Kecskemét (4 April 2012)
Home colours	Away colours

The 2011–12 season was Debreceni VSC's 34th competitive season, 19th consecutive season in the OTP Bank Liga (Nemzeti Bajnokság I) and 109th year in existence as a football club.

== First team squad ==
Note: Flags indicate national team as defined under FIFA eligibility rules; some limited exceptions apply. Players may hold more than one non-FIFA nationality.

No.	Pos.	Nation	Player
4	DF	GER	Dajan Šimac
5	MF	HUN	Gyula Illés
6	MF	HON	Luis Ramos
7	MF	HUN	Tibor Dombi
8	DF	HUN	Balázs Nikolov
10	FW	HUN	Balázs Farkas
11	MF	HUN	János Ferenczi
15	MF	HUN	László Rezes
17	DF	HUN	Norbert Mészáros
18	DF	HUN	Péter Máté
20	MF	CMR	Mbengono Yannick
22	DF	HUN	Csaba Bernáth
23	FW	HUN	Péter Szilágyi

No.	Pos.	Nation	Player
27	MF	HUN	Ádám Bódi
28	DF	HUN	Zoltán Nagy
29	MF	HUN	István Spitzmüller
30	FW	BIH	Stevo Nikolić
33	MF	HUN	József Varga
39	FW	FRA	Adamo Coulibaly
45	GK	SRB	Nenad Novaković
55	MF	HUN	Péter Szakály
69	DF	HUN	Mihály Korhut
70	MF	HUN	Tamás Kulcsár
87	GK	HUN	István Verpecz
88	MF	FRA	Selim Bouadla
99	FW	GAB	Roguy Méyé

== Transfers ==
=== Summer ===
In: Note: Flags indicate national team as defined under FIFA eligibility rules; some limited exceptions apply. Players may hold more than one non-FIFA nationality.

No.	Pos.	Nation	Player
15	MF	HUN	László Rezes (loan return from Vasas SC)
18	DF	HUN	Péter Máté (loan return from Szolnoki MÁV FC)
23	MF	HUN	Péter Szilágyi (loan return from Vasas SC)
26	MF	NED	Adnan Alisic (from (Netherlands) SBV Excelsior)
30	FW	BIH	Stevo Nikolić (from (Bosnia and Herzegovina) FK Borac Banja Luka)
40	FW	EST	Vjatšeslav Zahovaiko (from (Portugal) UD Leiria)
41	MF	HUN	Szilárd Éles (loan return from Mezőkövesd-Zsóry SE)
69	DF	HUN	Mihály Korhut (loan return from Kaposvári Rákóczi FC)
88	MF	FRA	Selim Bouadla (from (France) Le Havre AC)
91	FW	HUN	Ádám Balajti (loan return from Újpest FC)
––	DF	HUN	Norbert Kardos (loan return from Kaposvári Rákóczi FC)
––	DF	HUN	Dávid Mohl (loan return from Kecskeméti TE)

Out: Note: Flags indicate national team as defined under FIFA eligibility rules; some limited exceptions apply. Players may hold more than one non-FIFA nationality.

No.	Pos.	Nation	Player
11	FW	HUN	Péter Kabát (to Újpest FC)
14	FW	NGA	Eugène Salami (loan to Nyíregyháza Spartacus)
16	DF	HUN	Ádám Komlósi (to Kazincbarcikai SC)
41	MF	HUN	Szilárd Éles (loan to BFC Siófok)
46	FW	CMR	Essama Etogo (loan to (Albania) KF Tirana)
88	MF	HUN	Tamás Huszák (loan to BFC Siófok)
77	MF	HUN	Péter Czvitkovics (to (Belgium) K. V. Kortrijk)
91	FW	HUN	Ádám Balajti (loan to Újpest FC)
––	DF	HUN	Dávid Mohl (to Kecskeméti TE)

=== Winter ===
In: Note: Flags indicate national team as defined under FIFA eligibility rules; some limited exceptions apply. Players may hold more than one non-FIFA nationality.

No.	Pos.	Nation	Player
13	MF	HUN	Bence Ludánszki (from Debreceni VSC II)
14	FW	NGA	Eugène Salami (loan return from Nyíregyháza Spartacus)
26	MF	HUN	Norbert Kardos (loan return from Kaposvári Rákóczi FC)
91	FW	HUN	Ádám Balajti (loan return from Újpest FC)
99	FW	GAB	Roguy Méyé (from Zalaegerszegi TE)
—	MF	HUN	Ádám Szabó (from MTK Budapest FC)

Out: Note: Flags indicate national team as defined under FIFA eligibility rules; some limited exceptions apply. Players may hold more than one non-FIFA nationality.

No.	Pos.	Nation	Player
19	FW	BRA	Vinícius (on loan to Nyíregyháza Spartacus FC)
21	DF	HUN	Marcell Fodor (to Újpest FC)
23	FW	HUN	Péter Szilágyi (on loan to Lombard-Pápa TFC)
24	DF	MKD	Mirsad Mijadinoski (to (Switzerland) FC Wil)
26	MF	HUN	Norbert Kardos (to Gyirmót SE)
31	GK	LTU	Mindaugas Malinauskas (to (Lithuania) FK Šiauliai)
38	FW	HUN	Szabolcs Csorba (on loan to Nyíregyháza Spartacus FC)
40	FW	EST	Vjatšeslav Zahovaiko
91	FW	HUN	Ádám Balajti (on loan to MTK Budapest FC)
—	MF	HUN	Ádám Szabó (on loan to Mezőkövesd-Zsóry SE)

- List of Hungarian football transfer summer 2011
- List of Hungarian football transfers winter 2011–12

== Pre-season and friendlies ==
21 January 2012	Debreceni VSC	3–1	Balmazújvárosi FC	Debrecen
	Šimac 13'; Kulcsár 20'; Varga 80'	Report	Sárközi 10'	Stadium: Stadion Oláh Gábor Út; Attendance: 200; Referee: (Hungary) Péter Solymosi

21 January 2012	Debreceni VSC	3–0	FC Olimpia Satu Mare (Romania)	Debrecen
	Bódi 30'; Alisic 35'; Mokánszki 56'	Report		Stadium: Stadion Oláh Gábor Út; Attendance: 100; Referee: (Hungary) Roland Veizer

28 January 2012	Debreceni VSC	1–1	1. FC Tatran Prešov (Slovakia)	Debrecen
	B. Farkas 40'	Report	Piter-Bučko 67'	Stadium: Stadion Oláh Gábor Út; Attendance: 200; Referee: (Hungary) Roland Veizer

28 January 2012	Debreceni VSC	3–1	1. FC Tatran Prešov (Slovakia)	Debrecen
	Kulcsár 4', 55', 65'	Report	Coimbra 8'	Stadium: Stadion Oláh Gábor Út; Attendance: 200; Referee: (Hungary) Péter Solymosi

5 February 2012	Debreceni VSC	4–0	FK Baumit Jablonec (Czech Republic)	Belek, Turkey
	Coulibaly 31', 37' (pen.); Kulcsár 40'; Szakály 72'	Report

5 February 2012	Debreceni VSC	0–0	FC Irtysh Pavlodar (Kazakhstan)	Belek, Turkey
		Report

8 February 2012	Debreceni VSC	1–2	FK Senica (Slovakia)	Belek, Turkey
	Dombi 54'	Report	Kalabiška 51'; Diviš 56'

8 February 2012	Debreceni VSC	0–1	FC Steaua București (Romania)	Belek, Turkey
		Report	Bicfalvi 40'

11 February 2012	Debreceni VSC	1–2	FC Vaslui (Romania)	Belek, Turkey
	Bódi 25'	Report	Temwanjera 34'; Buhăescu 37'

11 February 2012	Debreceni VSC	2–2	1. FC Slovácko (Czech Republic)	Belek, Turkey
	Szakály 39', 51' (pen.)	Report

17 February 2012	Debreceni VSC	3–0	MFK Košice (Slovakia)	Debrecen
	Ludánszki; Salami; Yannick	Report		Stadium: Stadion Oláh Gábor Út; Attendance: 0 Referee: (Hungary) Roland Weizer

18 February 2012	Debreceni VSC	1–1	FC Bihor Oradea (Romania)	Debrecen
	Bouadla 52'	Report	Bîrză 30'	Stadium: Stadion Oláh Gábor Út; Attendance: 0 Referee: (Hungary) János Takács

== Competitions ==
=== Nemzeti Bajnokság I ===
==== League table ====
Pos	Team	Pld	W	D	L	GF	GA	GD	Pts	Qualification or relegation
1	Debrecen (C)	30	22	8	0	64	18	+46	74	Qualification for Champions League second qualifying round
2	Videoton	30	21	3	6	58	19	+39	66	Qualification for Europa League second qualifying round (Note: Since Debrecen won both the league and the 2011–12 Hungarian Cup competition, the second qualifying round berth transferred to the second-placed team of the league, and cup runners-up MTK (playing in the 2011–12 Nemzeti Bajnokság II) inherited the respective spot in the first qualifying round.)
3	Győr	30	20	3	7	56	31	+25	63	Ineligible for 2012–13 European competitions (Note: Győr have been suspended from participating in UEFA competitions for the first season they qualify between the 2011–12 and 2013–14 seasons in relation to club licensing violations. As a consequence, since they finish in any of the top three positions, the respective qualifying spots have been allocated to the team(s) immediately below.)
4	Honvéd	30	13	7	10	48	40	+8	46	Qualification for Europa League first qualifying round
5	Kecskemét	30	13	6	11	48	38	+10	45	

Source: MLSZ (in Hungarian)
Rules for classification: 1st points; 2nd overall wins; 3rd goal difference; 4th goals scored
(C) Champions

==== Results summary ====
Overall								Home						Away					
Pld	W	D	L	GF	GA	GD	Pts	W	D	L	GF	GA	GD	W	D	L	GF	GA	GD
30	22	8	0	64	18	+46	74	12	3	0	42	14	+28	10	5	0	22	4	+18

Last updated: 27 May 2012.
Source: NB1

==== Results by round ====
Round	1	2	3	4	5	6	7	8	9	10	11	12	13	14	15	16	17	18	19	20	21	22	23	24	25	26	27	28	29	30
Ground	H	A	H	A	H	A	H	A	H	A	H	H	A	H	A	A	H	A	H	A	H	A	H	A	H	A	A	H	A	H
Result	W	W	W	W	W	W	W	D	W	D	W	W	D	D	W	D	W	W	W	W	D	W	D	D	W	W	W	W	W	W
Position	1	1	1	1	1	1	1	1	1	1	1	1	1	1	1	1	1	1	1	1	1	1	1	1	1	1	1	1	1	1

Updated to match(es) played on 27 May 2012. Source: Matches
A = Away; H = Home; W = Win; D = Draw; L = Loss

==== Matches ====
15 July 2011 1	Debreceni VSC	5–2	Vasas SC	Debrecen
18:00 CEST	Kulcsár 4'; Coulibaly 21', 47', 55'; Szakály 33' (pen.)	Report	Šimić 49'; Kulcsár 52'	Stadium: Stadion Oláh Gábor Út; Attendance: 4,500; Referee: (Hungary) Sándor Andó-Szabó

22 July 2011 2	Zalaegerszegi TE	0–2	Debreceni VSC	Zalaegerszeg
18:00 CEST		Report	Kulcsár 77'; Yannick 79'	Stadium: ZTE Arena; Attendance: 3,500; Referee: (Hungary) Zsolt Szabó

31 July 2011 3	Debreceni VSC	1–0	Ferencvárosi TC	Debrecen
18:00 CEST	Bódi 45'	Report		Stadium: Stadion Oláh Gábor Út; Attendance: 9,000; Referee: (Hungary) Zoltán Iványi

7 August 2011 4	Kecskeméti TE	0–1	Debreceni VSC	Kecskemét
19:00 CEST		Report	Bódi 90+1'	Stadium: Széktói Stadion; Attendance: 4,000; Referee: (Chile) Alvaro Miquel Garcia

14 August 2011 5	Debreceni VSC	2–1	Videoton FC	Debrecen
16:00 CEST	Kulcsár 3'; Ramos 47'	Report	Korhut 41' (o.g.)	Stadium: Stadion Oláh Gábor Út; Attendance: 9,000; Referee: (Hungary) Viktor Kassai

20 August 2011 6	Lombard-Pápa TFC	0–2	Debreceni VSC	Pápa
15:00 CEST		Report	Bódi 45'; Nikolić 60'	Stadium: Stadion Várkerti; Attendance: 1,800; Referee: (Hungary) Gábor Oláh

28 August 2011 7	Debreceni VSC	3–2	Újpest FC	Debrecen
16:00 CEST	Bódi 22'; Yannick 49'; Coulibaly 63'	Report	Egerszegi 37'; Simon 74'	Stadium: Stadion Oláh Gábor Út; Attendance: 7,500; Referee: (Hungary) Zoltán Iványi

9 September 2011 8	BFC Siófok	0–0	Debreceni VSC	Siófok
18:00 CEST		Report		Stadium: Révész Street Stadium; Attendance: 500; Referee: (Hungary) István Vad

18 September 2011 9	Debreceni VSC	4–2	Paksi SE	Debrecen
16:00 CEST	Csehi 9' (o.g.); Coulibaly 66' 90+1'; Varga 75'	Report	Vayer 64' 85'	Stadium: Stadion Oláh Gábor Út; Attendance: 5,500; Referee: (Hungary) Szabolcs Szilasi

24 September 2011 10	Kaposvári Rákóczi FC	1–1	Debreceni VSC	Kaposvár
15:00 CEST	Haruna 80'	Report	Coulibaly 90+3' (pen.)	Stadium: Stadion Kaposvár Rákóczi; Attendance: 2,800; Referee: (Hungary) Zsolt Szabó

2 October 2011 11	Debreceni VSC	5–0	Diósgyőri VTK	Debrecen
16:00 CEST	Bódi 22'; Coulibaly 24', 40'; Nikolić 65'; Kulcsár 67'	Report		Stadium: Stadion Oláh Gábor Út; Attendance: 10,000; Referee: (Hungary) Zoltán Iványi

15 October 2011 12	Debreceni VSC	2–0	Győri ETO FC	Debrecen
15:00 CEST	Šimac 21'; Kulcsár 55'	Report		Stadium: Stadion Oláh Gábor Út; Attendance: 9,500; Referee: (Hungary) Tamás Bognár

23 October 2011 13	Pécsi Mecsek FC	0–0	Debreceni VSC	Pécs
18:00 CEST (UTC+01)		Report		Stadium: Stadion PMFC; Attendance: 4,000; Referee: (Hungary) István Vad

30 October 2011 14	Debreceni VSC	1–1	Budapest Honvéd FC	Debrecen
16:00 CET	Szakály 23'	Report	Danilo 54'	Stadium: Stadion Oláh Gábor Út; Attendance: 6,000; Referee: (Hungary) Viktor Kassai

5 November 2011 15	Szombathelyi Haladás	0–1	Debreceni VSC	Szombathely
17:30 CET		Report	Rezes 20'	Stadium: Rohonci Street Stadium; Attendance: 4,500; Referee: (Hungary) Zsolt Szabó

20 November 2011 16	Vasas SC	0–0	Debreceni VSC	Budapest
16:00 CET		Report		Stadium: Stadion Rudolf Illovszky; Attendance: 1,500; Referee: (Hungary) Szabolcs Szilasi

26 November 2011 17	Debreceni VSC	5–2	Zalaegerszegi TE	Debrecen
15:00 CET (UTC+01)	Nikolić 46' 49' 58'; Nagy 58'; Coulibaly 60' (pen.)	(Report)	Turkovs 17'; Kamber 29'	Stadium: Stadion Oláh Gábor Út; Attendance: 5,500; Referee: (Hungary) József Berger

3 March 2012 18	Ferencvárosi TC	1–2	Debreceni VSC	Budapest
17:30 CET	Klein 54'	Report	Coulibaly 42'; Szakály 80'	Stadium: Stadion Albert Flórián; Attendance: 9,300; Referee: (Hungary) Tamás Bognár

10 March 2012 19	Debreceni VSC	2–1	Kecskeméti TE	Debrecen
17:30 CET	Szakály 15'; Nagy 90+1'	Report	Bertus 40'	Stadium: Stadion Oláh Gábor Út; Attendance: 5,000; Referee: (Hungary) Gábor Oláh

18 March 2012 20	Videoton FC	0–1	Debreceni VSC	Székesfehérvár
16:00 CET		Report	Coulibaly 63'	Stadium: Sóstói Stadion; Attendance: 8,120; Referee: (Hungary) Zoltán Iványi

24 March 2012 21	Debreceni VSC	2–2	Lombard-Pápa TFC	Debrecen
15:00 CET	Kulcsár 6'; Coulibaly 50'	Report	Tóth 56'; Benko 67'	Stadium: Stadion Oláh Gábor Út; Attendance: 5,500; Referee: (Hungary) Dániel Becséri

1 April 2012 22	Újpest FC	1–5	Debreceni VSC	Budapest
16:00 CEST	Kabát 83' (pen.)	Report	Szakály 8'; Bódi 21', 73'; Coulibaly 39', 59'	Stadium: Szusza Ferenc Stadium; Attendance: 4,000; Referee: (Hungary) Zsolt Szabó

7 April 2012 23	Debreceni VSC	1–1	BFC Siófok	Debrecen
15:00 CEST	Mészáros 57'	Report	Šimac 80' (o.g.)	Stadium: Stadion Oláh Gábor Út; Attendance: 6,000; Referee: (Hungary) Balázs Berke

14 April 2012 24	Paksi SE	0–0	Debreceni VSC	Paks
15:00 CEST		Report		Stadium: Stadion PSE; Attendance: 3,000; Referee: (Hungary) Sándor Andó-Szabó

22 April 2012 25	Debreceni VSC	3–0	Kaposvári Rákóczi FC	Debrecen
18:30 CEST (UTC+01)	Korhut 7'; Méyé 28'; Bouadla 36'	Report		Stadium: Stadion Oláh Gábor Út; Attendance: 5,000; Referee: (Hungary) István Vad

29 April 2012 26	Diósgyőri VTK	0–2	Debreceni VSC	Miskolc
17:30 CEST		Report	Coulibaly 56' (pen.), 80'	Stadium: DVTK Stadion; Attendance: 9,000; Referee: (Hungary) Szabolcs Szilasi

6 May 2012 27	Győri ETO FC	1–2	Debreceni VSC	Győr
18:00 CEST	Varga 32'	Report	Szakály 38'; Coulibaly 65'	Stadium: ETO Park; Attendance: 10,000; Referee: (Hungary) Tamás Bognár

12 May 2012 28	Debreceni VSC	4–0	Pécsi MFC	Debrecen
17:30 CEST	Nagy 23' (o.g.); Bouadla 41'; Bódi 44'; Kulcsár 55'	Report		Stadium: Stadion Oláh Gábor Út; Attendance: 10,400; Referee: (Hungary) Ádám Farkas

20 May 2012 29	Budapest Honvéd FC	0–3	Debreceni VSC	Budapest
16:00 CEST		Report	Rezes 33'; Bouadla 75'; Coulibaly 80'	Stadium: Bozsik Stadion; Attendance: 2,000; Referee: (Hungary) Ádám Németh

26 May 2012 30	Debreceni VSC	2–0	Szombathelyi Haladás	Debrecen
18:00 CEST	Mészáros 21'; Coulibaly 54' (pen.)	Report		Stadium: Stadion Oláh Gábor Út; Attendance: 10,000; Referee: (Hungary) István Vad

=== Hungarian Cup ===
21 September 2011 3	Kazincbarcikai SC	1–5	Debreceni VSC	Kazincbarcika
15:30 CEST	Kovács 62'	Report	Nikolić 5', 13'; Kulcsár 45', 70', 83'	Stadium: Pete András Stadion; Attendance: 700; Referee: (Hungary) János Takács

26 October 2011 4	Ceglédi VSE	0–2	Debreceni VSC	Cegléd
14:00 CEST		Report	Nikolić 55'; Zahovaiko 60'	Stadium: Stadion Malomtó széli Attendance: 1,000; Referee: (Hungary) Dániel Becséri

30 November 2011 Round of 16 (1st leg)	Kecskeméti TE	1–2	Debreceni VSC	Kecskemét
16:45 CET	Bori 55'	Report	Coulibaly 5'; Korhut 20'	Stadium: Széktói Stadion; Attendance: 400; Referee: (Hungary) Tamás Bognár

3 December 2011 Round of 16 (2nd leg)	Debreceni VSC	1–1 (3–2 agg.)	Kecskeméti TE	Debrecen
15:00 CET	Kulcsár 89'	Report	Mohl 41'	Stadium: Stadion Oláh Gábor Út; Attendance: 2,700; Referee: (Hungary) István Vad

25 February 2012 Quarter-final (1st leg)	Kaposvári Rákóczi FC	0–1	Debreceni VSC	Kaposvár
14:00 CET		Report	Coulibaly 81'	Stadium: Stadion Kaposvár Rákóczi; Attendance: 600; Referee: (Hungary) Ádám Németh

13 March 2012 Quarter-final (2nd leg)	Debreceni VSC	0–0 (1–0 agg.)	Kaposvári Rákóczi FC	Debrecen
18:00 CET		Report		Stadium: Stadion Oláh Gábor Út; Attendance: 2,000; Referee: (Hungary) Szabolcs Szilasi

21 March 2012 Semi-final (1st leg)	Debreceni VSC	2–1	Újpest FC	Debrecen
19:15 CET	Méyé 4'; Lucas 48'	Report	Kabát 38'	Stadium: Stadion Oláh Gábor Út; Attendance: 3,500; Referee: (Hungary) Ádám Farkas

11 April 2012 Semi-final (2nd leg)	Újpest FC	1–3 (2–5 agg.)	Debreceni VSC	Budapest
18:00 CEST	Kabát 55'	Report	Bódi 58', 84'; Szakály 90+1'	Stadium: Szusza Ferenc Stadium; Attendance: 3,327; Referee: (Hungary) Tamás Bognár

1 May 2012 Final	MTK Budapest FC	3–3 (a.e.t.) (7–8 p)	Debreceni VSC	Budapest
18:00 CEST	Vukmir (yellow card) 12'; Könyves 45'; Ladányi 62'; Wolfe (yellow card) 71'; Zsidai 87'	Report	Bouadla 51'; Szakály 55', 89'; Nikolov (red card) 60'; Nagy (yellow card) 80'; Korhut (yellow card) 90+4'	Stadium: Ferenc Puskás Stadium

=== League Cup ===
==== Group stage ====
31 August 2011 1	Debreceni VSC	2–1	Diósgyőri VTK	Debrecen
17:00 CEST	Bouadla 43'; Alisic 58'	Report	Máté 73' (o.g.)	Stadium: Stadion Oláh Gábor Út; Attendance: 1,200; Referee: (Hungary) Ferenc Karakó

7 September 2011 2	Vasas SC	3–3	Debreceni VSC	Budapest
16:00 CEST	Ferkó 27'; Beliczky 34'; Mehmedagić 67'	Report	Alisic 42'; Szilágyi 73'; Ludánszki 80'	Stadium: Stadion Rudolf Illovszky; Attendance: 200; Referee: (Hungary) Gábor Kovács

5 October 2011 3	Debreceni VSC	6–0	Mezőkövesd-Zsóry SE	Debrecen
15:00 CEST	Lucas 23', 55'; Zahovaiko 42', 84'; Ferenczi 52', 89'	Report		Stadium: Stadion Oláh Gábor Út; Attendance: 1,200; Referee: (Hungary) Tibor Farkas

12 October 2011 4	Mezőkövesd-Zsóry SE	0–1	Debreceni VSC	Mezőkövesd
15:00 CEST		Report	Rezes 43'	Stadium: Mezőkövesdi Városi Stadion; Attendance: 600; Referee: (Hungary) Zoltán J. Kovács

8 November 2011 5	Debreceni VSC	5–4	Vasas SC	Debrecen
18:00 CET	Alisic 28'; Zahovaiko 33', 44'; Ferenczi 50' (pen.); Mijadinoski 71'	Report	Hudson-Odoi 51' 90+2'; Mészáros 63'; Máté 67' (o.g.)	Stadium: Stadion Oláh Gábor Út; Attendance: 1,300; Referee: (Hungary) Szabolcs Fenyvesi

16 November 2011 6	Diósgyőri VTK	0–1	Debreceni VSC	Miskolc
16:30 CET		Report	Alisic 40'	Stadium: DVTK Stadion; Attendance: 1,500; Referee: (Hungary) Ádám Németh

===== Classification =====
Pos	Team	Pld	W	D	L	GF	GA	GD	Pts	Qualification
1	Debrecen	6	5	1	0	18	8	+10	16	Advance to knockout phase
2	Diósgyőr	6	3	1	2	12	5	+7	10	Advance to knockout phase
3	Mezőkövesd-Zsóry	6	1	1	4	7	18	−11	4	
4	Vasas	6	0	3	3	12	18	−6	3	

Rules for classification: 1) points; 2) goal difference; 3) number of goals scored.

==== Knockout phase ====
28 February 2012 Quarter-final (1st leg)	Paksi SE	0–1	Debreceni VSC	Paks
16:30 CET		Report	Spitzmüller 54'	Stadium: Stadion PSE; Attendance: 100; Referee: (Hungary) Ádám Farkas

6 March 2012 Quarter-final (2nd leg)	Debreceni VSC	1–1 (2–1 agg.)	Paksi SE	Debrecen
18:00 CET	Méyé 12'	Report	Ludánszki 24' (o.g.)	Stadium: Stadion Oláh Gábor Út; Attendance: 1,200; Referee: (Hungary) János Takács

28 March 2012 Semi-final (1st leg)	Kecskeméti TE	4–0	Debreceni VSC	Kecskemét
18:00 CET	Tököli 9', 30' (pen.); Litsingi 44'; Lencse 74'	Report		Stadium: Széktói Stadion; Attendance: 500; Referee: (Hungary) Tamás Bognár

4 April 2012 Semi-final (2nd leg)	Debreceni VSC	1–1 (1–5 agg.)	Kecskeméti TE	Debrecen
18:00 CET	B. Farkas 23' (pen.)	Report	Tököli 54'	Stadium: Stadion Oláh Gábor Út; Attendance: 500; Referee: (Hungary) János Takács

== Statistics ==
=== Appearances and goals ===
Last updated on 27 May 2012.

No.	Pos	Nat	Player	Total		OTP Bank Liga		Hungarian Cup		League Cup	
No.	Pos	Nat	Player	Apps	Goals	Apps	Goals	Apps	Goals	Apps	Goals
4	DF	(Germany) GER	Dajan Šimac	30	1	25	1	5	0	0	0
5	MF	(Hungary) HUN	Gyula Illés	13	0	3	0	4	0	6	0
6	MF	(Honduras) HON	Luis Ramos	25	1	13	1	7	0	5	0
7	MF	(Hungary) HUN	Tibor Dombi	16	0	6	0	2	0	8	0
8	DF	(Hungary) HUN	Balázs Nikolov	25	0	9	0	7	0	9	0
10	FW	(Hungary) HUN	Balázs Farkas	9	1	4	0	2	0	3	1
11	MF	(Hungary) HUN	János Ferenczi	7	3	2	0	1	0	4	3
15	MF	(Hungary) HUN	László Rezes	27	3	17	2	6	0	4	1
17	DF	(Hungary) HUN	Norbert Mészáros	34	2	28	2	6	0	0	0
18	DF	(Hungary) HUN	Péter Máté	24	0	10	0	5	0	9	0
20	MF	(Cameroon) CMR	Mbengono Yannick	32	2	21	2	6	0	5	0
22	DF	(Hungary) HUN	Csaba Bernáth	13	0	2	0	2	0	9	0
27	MF	(Hungary) HUN	Ádám Bódi	33	10	29	8	4	2	0	0
28	DF	(Hungary) HUN	Zoltán Nagy	27	2	24	2	3	0	0	0
29	MF	(Hungary) HUN	István Spitzmüller	13	1	3	0	1	0	9	1
30	FW	(Bosnia and Herzegovina) BIH	Stevo Nikolić	34	8	22	5	6	3	6	0
33	MF	(Hungary) HUN	József Varga	31	1	26	1	5	0	0	0
39	FW	(France) FRA	Adamo Coulibaly	32	22	27	20	5	2	0	0
45	GK	(Serbia) SRB	Nenad Novaković	29	-20	25	-17	4	-3	0	0
55	MF	(Hungary) HUN	Péter Szakály	33	9	29	6	4	3	0	0
69	DF	(Hungary) HUN	Mihály Korhut	34	2	29	1	5	1	0	0
70	MF	(Hungary) HUN	Tamás Kulcsár	31	11	23	7	7	4	1	0
87	GK	(Hungary) HUN	István Verpecz	17	-16	5	-1	4	-5	8	-10
88	MF	(France) FRA	Selim Bouadla	30	5	24	3	5	1	1	1
99	FW	(Gabon) GAB	Roguy Méyé	12	3	6	1	2	1	4	1
Youth players
2	DF	(Hungary) HUN	István Szűcs	2	0	0	0	0	0	2	0
14	FW	(Nigeria) NGA	Eugène Salami	3	0	0	0	1	0	2	0
21	MF	(Hungary) HUN	Bence Ludánszki	9	1	0	0	1	0	8	1
23	DF	(Hungary) HUN	Gergő Oláh	1	0	0	0	0	0	1	0
25	MF	(Hungary) HUN	Norbert Mokánszki	2	0	0	0	0	0	2	0
26	MF	(Netherlands) NED	Adnan Alisic	10	4	0	0	2	0	8	4
36	MF	(Hungary) HUN	Dávid Sigér	2	0	0	0	0	0	2	0
37	MF	(Brazil) BRA	Lucas	13	3	0	0	5	1	8	2
40	FW	(Hungary) HUN	Márk Szécsi	2	0	0	0	0	0	2	0
50	DF	(Romania) ROU	Ştefan Mardare	5	0	0	0	1	0	4	0
Players currently out on loan
19	FW	(Brazil) BRA	Vinícius	2	0	0	0	0	0	2	0
23	FW	(Hungary) HUN	Péter Szilágyi	9	1	1	0	3	0	5	1
38	FW	(Hungary) HUN	Szabolcs Csorba	2	0	0	0	0	0	2	0
Players no longer at the club
21	DF	(Hungary) HUN	Marcell Fodor	6	0	0	0	1	0	5	0
24	DF	(North Macedonia) MKD	Mirsad Mijadinoski	8	1	3	0	1	0	4	1
31	GK	(Lithuania) LTU	Mindaugas Malinauskas	3	-5	0	0	1	0	2	-5
40	FW	(Estonia) EST	Vjatšeslav Zahovaiko	9	5	2	0	2	1	5	4

=== Top scorers ===
Includes all competitive matches. The list is sorted by shirt number when total goals are equal.

Last updated on 27 May 2012

Position	Nation	Number	Name	OTP Bank Liga	Hungarian Cup	League Cup	Total
1	(France) (Mali)	39	Adamo Coulibaly	20	2	0	22
2	(Hungary)	70	Tamás Kulcsár	7	4	0	11
3	(Hungary)	27	Ádám Bódi	8	2	0	10
4	(Hungary)	55	Péter Szakály	6	3	0	9
5	(Bosnia and Herzegovina)	30	Stevo Nikolić	5	3	0	8
6	(France) (Algeria)	88	Selim Bouadla	3	1	1	5
7	(Estonia)	40	Vjatšeslav Zahovaiko	1	0	4	5
8	(Netherlands) (Turkey)	26	Adnan Alisic	0	0	4	4
9	(Hungary)	15	László Rezes	2	0	1	3
10	(Gabon)	99	Roguy Méyé	1	1	1	3
11	(Brazil)	37	Lucas	0	1	2	3
12	(Hungary)	11	János Ferenczi	0	0	3	3
13	(Cameroon)	20	Mbengono Yannick	2	0	0	2
14	(Hungary)	28	Zoltán Nagy	2	0	0	2
15	(Hungary)	17	Norbert Mészáros	2	0	0	2
16	(Hungary)	69	Mihály Korhut	1	1	0	2
17	(Honduras)	6	Luis Ramos	1	0	0	1
18	(Hungary)	33	József Varga	1	0	0	1
19	(Germany) (Croatia)	4	Dajan Šimac	1	0	0	1
20	(Hungary)	23	Péter Szilágyi	0	0	1	1
21	(Hungary)	21	Bence Ludánszki	0	0	1	1
22	(North Macedonia) (Switzerland)	24	Mirsad Mijadinoski	0	0	1	1
23	(Hungary)	29	István Spitzmüller	0	0	1	1
24	(Hungary)	10	Balázs Farkas	0	0	1	1
/	/	/	Own Goals	2	0	0	2
			TOTALS	64	18	21	103

=== Disciplinary record ===
Includes all competitive matches. Players with 1 card or more included only.

Last updated on 27 May 2012

Position	Nation	Number	Name	OTP Bank Liga		Hungarian Cup		League Cup		Total (Hu Total)	
Position	Nation	Number	Name	Booked	Sent off (straight red)	Booked	Sent off (straight red)	Booked	Sent off (straight red)	Booked	Sent off (straight red)
DF	(Hungary)	2	István Szűcs	0	0	0	0	1	0	1 (0)	0 (0)
DF	(Germany) (Croatia)	4	Dajan Šimac	2	1	1	0	0	0	3 (2)	1 (1)
MF	(Hungary)	5	Gyula Illés	2	0	0	0	1	0	3 (2)	0 (0)
MF	(Honduras)	6	Luis Ramos	1	0	1	0	1	0	3 (1)	0 (0)
MF	(Hungary)	7	Tibor Dombi	0	0	0	0	2	0	2 (0)	0 (0)
DF	(Hungary)	8	Balázs Nikolov	1	0	1	1	2	0	4 (1)	1 (0)
FW	(Hungary)	10	Balázs Farkas	1	0	0	0	0	0	1 (1)	0 (0)
MF	(Hungary)	15	László Rezes	4	0	1	0	0	0	5 (4)	0 (0)
DF	(Hungary)	17	Norbert Mészáros	4	0	1	0	0	0	5 (4)	0 (0)
DF	(Hungary)	18	Péter Máté	2	0	1	0	1	0	4 (2)	0 (0)
MF	(Cameroon)	20	Mbengono Yannick	0	0	1	0	0	0	1 (0)	0 (0)
MF	(Hungary)	21	Bence Ludánszki	0	0	0	0	1	0	1 (0)	0 (0)
DF	(Hungary)	22	Csaba Bernáth	0	0	1	0	2	0	3 (0)	0 (0)
MF	(Netherlands) (Turkey)	26	Adnan Alisic	0	0	0	0	1	0	1 (0)	0 (0)
MF	(Hungary)	27	Ádám Bódi	6	0	0	0	0	0	6 (6)	0 (0)
DF	(Hungary)	28	Zoltán Nagy	6	0	1	0	0	0	7 (6)	0 (0)
MF	(Hungary)	29	István Spitzmüller	0	0	0	0	2	0	2 (0)	0 (0)
FW	(Bosnia and Herzegovina)	30	Stevo Nikolić	1	0	0	0	1	0	2 (1)	0 (0)
MF	(Hungary)	33	József Varga	10	0	2	0	0	0	12 (10)	0 (0)
MF	(Brazil)	37	Lucas	0	0	1	0	1	0	2 (0)	0 (0)
FW	(France) (Mali)	39	Adamo Coulibaly	5	1	0	0	0	0	5 (5)	1 (1)
FW	(Estonia)	40	Vjatšeslav Zahovaiko	0	0	0	1	0	0	0 (0)	1 (0)
GK	(Serbia)	45	Nenad Novaković	1	0	0	0	0	0	1 (1)	0 (0)
DF	(Romania)	50	Ştefan Mardare	0	0	0	1	0	0	0 (0)	1 (0)
MF	(Hungary)	55	Péter Szakály	3	0	1	0	0	0	4 (3)	0 (0)
DF	(Hungary)	69	Mihály Korhut	5	1	3	0	0	0	8 (5)	1 (1)
MF	(Hungary)	70	Tamás Kulcsár	2	0	2	0	0	0	4 (2)	0 (0)
MF	(France) (Algeria)	88	Selim Bouadla	4	0	0	0	0	0	4 (4)	0 (0)
FW	(Gabon)	99	Roguy Méyé	1	0	1	0	0	0	2 (1)	0 (0)
			TOTALS	61	3	19	3	16	0	98 (61)	6 (3)

=== Overall ===
Games played	49 (30 OTP Bank Liga, 9 Hungarian Cup and 10 Hungarian League Cup)
Games won	34 (22 OTP Bank Liga, 6 Hungarian Cup and 6 Hungarian League Cup)
Games drawn	14 (8 OTP Bank Liga, 3 Hungarian Cup and 3 Hungarian League Cup)
Games lost	1 (0 OTP Bank Liga, 0 Hungarian Cup and 1 Hungarian League Cup)
Goals scored	103
Goals conceded	40
Goal difference	+63
Yellow cards	98
Red cards	6
Worst discipline	(Hungary) József Varga (12 (yellow card) , 0 (red card) )
Best result	6–0 (H) v Mezőkövesd-Zsóry SE – Ligakupa – 5 October 2011
Worst result	0–4 (A) v Kecskeméti TE – Ligakupa – 28 March 2012
Most appearances	(Bosnia and Herzegovina) Stevo Nikolić (34 appearances)
Most appearances	(Hungary) Norbert Mészáros (34 appearances)
Most appearances	(Hungary) Mihály Korhut (34 appearances)
Top scorer	(France) (Mali) Adamo Coulibaly (22 goals)
Points	116/147 (78.91%)

Last updated: 27 May 2012
