= 2010–11 Debreceni VSC season =

Debreceni VSC – TEVA
2010–11 season
- Chairman: Sándor Szilágyi
- Manager: András Herczeg (until 20 December 2010); Zdeněk Ščasný (until 16 April 2011); Elemér Kondás
- NB 1: 5.
- Hungarian Cup: Round of 16
- Hungarian League Cup: Runners-up
- UEFA Champions League: Third qualifying round
- UEFA Europa League: Group stage
- Top goalscorer: League: Adamo Coulibaly (14); All: Adamo Coulibaly (19)
- Highest home attendance: 8,000 v FC Levadia Tallinn (21 July 2010)
- Lowest home attendance: 500 v Kecskeméti TE (10 November 2010)

The 2010–11 season was Debreceni VSC's 33rd competitive season, 18th consecutive season in the Soproni Liga and 108th year in existence as a football club.

== Team kit and logo ==
The team kits for the 2010–11 season are produced by Adidas and the shirt sponsor is TEVA. The home kit is red colour and the away kit is white colour.

Home	Away

== Squad ==
=== First-team squad ===
Updated 18 March 2011.

Note: Flags indicate national team as defined under FIFA eligibility rules; some limited exceptions apply. Players may hold more than one non-FIFA nationality.

No.	Pos.	Nation	Player
2	DF	HUN	István Szűcs
4	DF	GER	Dajan Šimac
5	MF	HUN	Gyula Illés
6	MF	HON	Luis Ramos
7	MF	HUN	Tibor Dombi
8	DF	HUN	Balázs Nikolov
10	FW	HUN	Balázs Farkas
11	FW	HUN	Péter Kabát
14	FW	NGA	Eugène Salami
15	MF	HUN	László Rezes
16	DF	HUN	Ádám Komlósi
18	DF	HUN	Péter Máté
20	MF	CMR	Mbengono Yannick
21	DF	HUN	Marcell Fodor
22	DF	HUN	Csaba Bernáth
23	FW	HUN	Péter Szilágyi
24	DF	MKD	Mirsad Mijadinoski

No.	Pos.	Nation	Player
27	MF	HUN	Ádám Bódi
28	DF	HUN	Zoltán Nagy
29	DF	HUN	István Spitzmüller
30	MF	HUN	Zoltán Kiss
31	GK	LTU	Mindaugas Malinauskas
33	MF	HUN	József Varga
39	FW	FRA	Adamo Coulibaly
45	GK	SRB	Nenad Novaković
50	DF	ROU	Ştefan Mardare
55	MF	HUN	Péter Szakály
69	MF	HUN	Mihály Korhut
70	MF	HUN	Tamás Kulcsár
77	MF	HUN	Péter Czvitkovics
86	DF	HUN	Zsolt Laczkó
87	GK	HUN	István Verpecz
91	FW	HUN	Ádám Balajti

=== European Cups squad ===
Updated 16 September 2010.

Note: Flags indicate national team as defined under FIFA eligibility rules; some limited exceptions apply. Players may hold more than one non-FIFA nationality.

No.	Pos.	Nation	Player
6	MF	HON	Luis Ramos
7	MF	HUN	Tibor Dombi
10	FW	HUN	Balázs Farkas
11	FW	HUN	Péter Kabát
15	MF	HUN	László Rezes
16	DF	HUN	Ádám Komlósi
18	DF	HUN	Péter Máté
20	MF	CMR	Mbengono Yannick
21	DF	HUN	Marcell Fodor
22	DF	HUN	Csaba Bernáth
24	DF	MKD	Mirsad Mijadinoski

No.	Pos.	Nation	Player
27	MF	HUN	Ádám Bódi
28	DF	HUN	Zoltán Nagy
30	MF	HUN	Zoltán Kiss
31	GK	LTU	Mindaugas Malinauskas
33	MF	HUN	József Varga
39	FW	FRA	Adamo Coulibaly
55	MF	HUN	Péter Szakály
70	MF	HUN	Tamás Kulcsár
77	MF	HUN	Péter Czvitkovics
86	DF	HUN	Zsolt Laczkó
87	GK	HUN	István Verpecz

== Transfers ==
=== Summer ===
In: Note: Flags indicate national team as defined under FIFA eligibility rules; some limited exceptions apply. Players may hold more than one non-FIFA nationality.

No.	Pos.	Nation	Player
2	DF	HUN	István Szűcs (loan return from Kecskemét)
4	DF	GER	Dajan Simac (from FSV Frankfurt)
10	FW	HUN	Balázs Farkas (from Dynamo Kyiv)
11	FW	HUN	Péter Kabát (from Újpest FC)
28	DF	HUN	Zoltán Nagy (loan return from Budapest Honvéd)
31	GK	LTU	Mindaugas Malinauskas (from Diósgyőri VTK)
70	MF	HUN	Tamás Kulcsár (from Polonia Warsaw)
88	MF	HUN	Tamás Huszák (loan return from Diósgyőri VTK)
91	FW	HUN	Ádám Balajti (from Diósgyőri VTK)
—	MF	HUN	Tamás Szélpál (loan return from Szolnoki MÁV)
—	MF	SRB	Predrag Pavlović (from FK Napredak Kruševac)

Out: Note: Flags indicate national team as defined under FIFA eligibility rules; some limited exceptions apply. Players may hold more than one non-FIFA nationality.

No.	Pos.	Nation	Player
4	MF	HUN	Dávid Mohl (to Kecskeméti TE)
11	FW	HUN	Róbert Feczesin (loan return to Brescia Calcio)
13	DF	HUN	Péter Bíró (to Lombard-Pápa TFC)
14	FW	HUN	Gergely Rudolf (to Genoa C.F.C.)
25	DF	HUN	Zoltán Szélesi (to Olympiacos Volos)
46	FW	CMR	Etogo Essama (on loan to Bőcs KSC)
60	MF	SVK	Károly Czanik (on loan to Szolnoki MÁV FC)
81	MF	HUN	Attila Katona (on loan to Bőcs KSC)

=== Winter ===
In: Note: Flags indicate national team as defined under FIFA eligibility rules; some limited exceptions apply. Players may hold more than one non-FIFA nationality.

No.	Pos.	Nation	Player
5	MF	HUN	Gyula Illés (from Zalaegerszegi TE)
8	DF	HUN	Balázs Nikolov (from Paksi SE)
14	FW	NGA	Eugène Salami (from Niger Tornadoes F.C.)
45	GK	SRB	Nenad Novaković (from FC Nordsjælland)
46	FW	CMR	Etogo Essama (loan return from Bőcs KSC)
50	DF	ROU	Ştefan Mardare (from FC Rapid București)
81	MF	HUN	Attila Katona (loan return from Bőcs KSC)

Out: Note: Flags indicate national team as defined under FIFA eligibility rules; some limited exceptions apply. Players may hold more than one non-FIFA nationality.

No.	Pos.	Nation	Player
12	GK	SRB	Đorđe Pantić (to FC Pyunik)
15	FW	HUN	László Rezes (on loan to Vasas SC)
17	DF	HUN	Mihály Korhut (on loan to Kaposvári Rákóczi FC)
18	DF	HUN	Péter Máté (on loan to Szolnoki MÁV FC)
23	FW	HUN	Péter Szilágyi (on loan to Vasas SC)
26	MF	HUN	Norbert Kardos (on loan to Kaposvári Rákóczi FC)
30	MF	HUN	Zoltán Kiss (to Panserraikos F.C.)
32	MF	SRB	Predrag Pavlović (to FK Metalac Gornji Milanovac)
81	MF	HUN	Attila Katona (to BFC Siófok)
86	DF	HUN	Zsolt Laczkó (to U.C. Sampdoria)
91	FW	HUN	Ádám Balajti (on loan to Újpest FC)
––	GK	HUN	Gergő Szécsi (on loan to Békéscsaba 1912 Előre SE)

List of Hungarian football transfer summer 2010 List of Hungarian football transfer winter 2010

== Club ==
=== Coaching staff ===
Position	Staff
Manager	(Hungary) András Herczeg
Assistant managers	(Serbia) Zoran Spisljak
Assistant managers	(Hungary) Zsolt Bücs
First team fitness coach	(Hungary) Mihály Dankó
Goalkeeping coach	(Hungary) József Mező
Head scout	(Hungary) Norbert Csarnai
Club doctor	(Hungary) Dr. Zoltán Dézsi
Club doctor	(Hungary) Dr. Lehel Varga
Masseur	(Hungary) István Nagy
Reserve team manager	(Hungary) Elemér Kondás
Youth team manager	(Hungary) László Sáfár
Academy manager	(Hungary) István Antal

Last updated: 13 July 2010

=== Other information ===
General Manager	(Hungary) Sándor Szilágyi
Sport Director	(Hungary) Dr. Csaba Bartha
Technical Leader	(Hungary) Béla Horváth
Security Chief	(Hungary) János Képíró
Chief Organiser	(Hungary) János Képíró Jr
Ground (capacity and dimensions)	Stadion Oláh Gábor Út (10,200 / 105x68 meters)

Updated to match played 13 July 2010

== Pre-season and friendlies ==
26 June 2010	Debreceni VSC	3–5	(Slovakia) MŠK Žilina	Debrecen
	Czvitkovics; Coulibaly	Report	Zošák; Ceesay; Oravec; Christu; Majtán	Stadium: Stadion Oláh Gábor Út; Attendance: 500; Referee: Roland Veizer

3 July 2010	Debreceni VSC	1–3	(Romania) CS Gaz Metan Mediaş	Debrecen
	Szakály	Report	de Oliveira; Raul; Muntean	Stadium: Nagyerdei Stadion; Attendance: 1,000; Referee: Roland Veizer

7 July 2010	Debreceni VSC	1–2	(Romania) FC Victoria Brăneşti	Debrecen
	Angyal	Report	Simion; Maghici	Stadium: Nagyerdei Stadion; Attendance: 100; Referee: Zoltán Török

10 July 2010	Debreceni VSC	3–1	Szolnoki MÁV FC	Debrecen
	Kulcsár 32' (pen.); Essama 42'; Vinicius 89'	Report	Marozas 36'	Stadium: Stadion Oláh Gábor Út; Attendance: 200; Referee: Csaba Sápi

11 July 2010	Debreceni VSC	3–1	(Romania) FC Victoria Brăneşti	Debrecen
	Sigér; Csorba; Angyal	Report	Coman	Stadium: Nagyerdei Stadion; Attendance: 100; Referee: Puskás

14 July 2010	Debreceni VSC	4–3	Nyíregyháza Spartacus	Debrecen
18:15	Korhut; Kulcsár (pen.); Bernáth; Huszák	Report	Homma; Andorka	Stadium: Vágóhíd utcai Stadion; Attendance: 50

22 July 2010	Hajdúböszörményi TE	1–4	Debreceni VSC	Hajdúböszörmény
18:15	Bogdanović 60' (pen.)	Report	Korhut 27'; Bódi 40'; Pavlović 44'; Essama 85'	Stadium: Városi Stadion; Attendance: 150; Referee: Kövér

24 July 2010	Debreceni VSC	3–1	(Romania) FC Bihor Oradea	Debrecen
18:15	Kucsár; Vinicius	Report	Deaconescu	Stadium: Stadion Oláh Gábor Út; Attendance: 400; Referee: Nazsa

== Competitions ==
=== Super Cup ===
7 July 2010	Debreceni VSC	1–0	Videoton FC Fehérvár	Debrecen
18:00 CEST	Fodor (yellow card) 59'; P. Szakály 66'	Report	G. Horváth (yellow card) 49'; Lipták (yellow card) 88'	Stadium: Stadion Oláh Gábor Út; Attendance: 1,500; Referee: Zsolt Szabó

=== Nemzeti Bajnokság I ===
==== League table ====
Pos	Team	Pld	W	D	L	GF	GA	GD	Pts	Qualification or relegation
3	Ferencváros	30	15	5	10	50	43	+7	50	Qualification for Europa League first qualifying round
4	ZTE	30	14	6	10	51	47	+4	48	
5	Debrecen	30	12	10	8	53	43	+10	46	
6	Újpest	30	13	6	11	50	38	+12	45	
7	Kaposvár	30	13	4	13	41	42	−1	43	

Source: soccerway.com
Rules for classification: 1st points; 2nd overall wins; 3rd goal difference; 4th goals scored

==== Results summary ====
Overall								Home						Away					
Pld	W	D	L	GF	GA	GD	Pts	W	D	L	GF	GA	GD	W	D	L	GF	GA	GD
30	12	10	8	53	43	+10	46	10	3	2	37	18	+19	2	7	6	16	25	−9

Last updated: 22 May 2011.
Source: NB1

==== Results by round ====
Round	1	2	3	4	5	6	7	8	9	10	11	12	13	14	15	16	17	18	19	20	21	22	23	24	25	26	27	28	29	30
Ground	H	A	H	A	H	A	H	A	H	A	H	H	H	H	A	A	H	A	H	A	H	A	H	A	H	A	A	A	A	H
Result	W	D	W	L	W	L	D	L	W	D	W	W	W	W	L	D	W	L	D	L	D	D	L	W	W	D	D	W	D	L
Position	3	4	1	2	1	5	5	9	5	7	5	4	3	2	4	5	3	4	5	6	6	6	6	6	6	5	6	4	4	5

Updated to match(es) played on 22 May 2011. Source: Matches
A = Away; H = Home; W = Win; D = Draw; L = Loss

==== Matches ====
31 July 2010 1	Debreceni VSC	2–0	Lombard-Pápa TFC	Debrecen
17:30 CEST	P. Szilágyi 18'; T. Kulcsár 32'	Report	Rajnay (yellow card) 64'; A. Farkas (yellow card) 82'	Stadium: Stadion Oláh Gábor Út; Attendance: 3,000; Referee: Mihály Fábián

8 August 2010 2	Paksi SE	2–2	Debreceni VSC	Paks
17:30 CEST	Montvai 5'; Fiola (yellow card) 16'; T. Heffler 84' (pen.); Bartha (yellow card) 87'	Report	Kabát 4'; Yannick (red card) 21'; Šimac 40'; Komlósi (yellow card) 54'; Ramos (yellow card) 83'	Stadium: Stadion PSE; Attendance: 3,000; Referee: Szabolcs Szilasi

14 August 2010 3	Debreceni VSC	6–2	Kecskeméti TE	Debrecen
19:00 CEST	Kiss 18' (red card) 87'; Coulibaly 33'; Czvitkovics 47' 84'; Kabát 86'; Dombi 91'	Report	Foxi 49' 74'; Ebala (yellow card) 75'; Tököli (red card) 77'; Čukić (yellow card) 87'; Holczer (yellow card) 91'	Stadium: Stadion Oláh Gábor Út; Attendance: 5,500; Referee: Ádám Farkas

22 August 2010 4	Budapest Honvéd FC	1–0	Debreceni VSC	Budapest
17:30 CEST	Coira 22'; Akassou (yellow card) 25'; Rufino (yellow card) 77'	Report	Fodor (yellow card) 37'; Spitzmüller (yellow card) 85'	Stadium: Bozsik Stadion; Attendance: 1,200; Referee: Zsolt Szabó

29 August 2010 5	Debreceni VSC	3–1	Videoton FC	Debrecen
19:00 CEST	Laczkó (yellow card) 67'; Czvitkovics 68' (pen.); Yannick 71'; Horváth 90' (o.g.)	Report	Alves (yellow card) 36'; Nagy (yellow card) 38'; Sándor 55'; Horváth (yellow card) 67'; Vaskó (yellow card) 78'	Stadium: Stadion Oláh Gábor Út; Attendance: 5,500; Referee: Zoltán Iványi

10 September 2010 6	Győri ETO FC	3–0	Debreceni VSC	Győr
19:00 CEST	Koltai 7' 67'; Ji-Paraná (yellow card) 38'; Aleksidze (yellow card) 43' (goal) 87'	Report	Nagy (yellow card) 34'; B. Farkas (red card) 42'; Komlósi (yellow card) 43'; Varga (yellow card) 84'	Stadium: ETO Park; Attendance: 3,000; Referee: Mihály Fábián

19 September 2010 7	Debreceni VSC	1–1	Újpest FC	Debrecen
17:30 CEST	Laczkó (yellow card) 22' (goal) 75'; Komlósi (yellow card) 78'	Report	Mitrović (yellow card) 15'; Simek 73'	Stadium: Stadion Oláh Gábor Út; Attendance: 4,000; Referee: István Vad

25 September 2010 8	BFC Siófok	4–1	Debreceni VSC	Siófok
15:00 CEST	Tusori 11' 44'; Sowunmi 19' 28' (yellow card) 63'; Lukács (yellow card) 56'; Fehér (yellow card) 65'; Homma (yellow card) 65'	Report	Varga (yellow card) 37'; Laczkó (yellow card) 42'; Szakály 50' (pen.); Ramos (yellow card) 85'	Stadium: Révesz Géza Stadion; Attendance: 1,200; Referee: Zoltán Iványi

3 October 2010 9	Debreceni VSC	3–1	Vasas SC	Debrecen
17:30 CEST	Coulibaly 14' 17' (pen.); Kabát 68' (yellow card) 81'	Report	Arsić (yellow card) 52'; Németh (yellow card) 69'; Ferenczi 80'	Stadium: Stadion Oláh Gábor Út; Attendance: 3,500; Referee: Ádám Németh

16 October 2010 10	MTK Budapest FC	0–0	Debreceni VSC	Budapest
15:00 CEST	Vukadinović (yellow card) 43'; Tischler (yellow card) 53'; Sütő (yellow card) 61'	Report	Varga (yellow card) 79'; Kiss (yellow card) 90'; Šimac (yellow card) 90+2'	Stadium: Stadion Hidegkuti Nándor; Attendance: 1,000; Referee: Viktor Kassai

24 October 2010 11	Debreceni VSC	2–1	Ferencvárosi TC	Debrecen
17:30 CEST	Kabát 5' (pen.) (yellow card) 15' (yellow-red card) 58'; Czvitkovics 88'	Report	Rósa (yellow card) 30'; Schembri (yellow card) 50'; Rodenbücher 75'	Stadium: Stadion Oláh Gábor Út; Attendance: 7,000; Referee: Zoltán Iványi

29 October 2010 12	Debreceni VSC	3–1	Kaposvári Rákóczi FC	Debrecen
17:30 CEST	Šimac (yellow card) 31'; Bódi 36'; Czvitkovics 71' 75'	Report	Kulcsár (yellow card) 38'; Oláh 43'; Grúz (yellow card) 70'; Pedro (yellow card) 77'	Stadium: Stadion Oláh Gábor Út; Attendance: 3,000; Referee: Zsolt Szabó

7 November 2010 13	Debreceni VSC	4–0	Szolnoki MÁV FC	Debrecen
17:30 CEST	Szakály 56' 70'; Coulibaly 83'; Šimac 90+1'	Report		Stadium: Stadion Oláh Gábor Út; Attendance: 3,000; Referee: Tamás Bognár

13 November 2010 14	Debreceni VSC	2–1	Zalaegerszegi TE	Debrecen
15:00 CEST	Varga 6' (o.g.); Coulibaly 22'; Varga (yellow card) 31'; Dombi (yellow card) 92'	Report	Szalai (yellow card) 38'; Simon 52'; Rajcomar (yellow card) 67'; Panikvar (yellow card) 71'; Kamber (yellow card) 79'; Horváth (yellow card) 88'	Stadium: Stadion Oláh Gábor Út; Attendance: 4,000; Referee: Zoltán Iványi

20 November 2010 15	Szombathelyi Haladás	3–0	Debreceni VSC	Szombathely
15:00 CEST	Fodrek 3' 45' (yellow card) 70'; Á. Simon (yellow card) 34'; Tóth 72' (pen.); Oross (yellow card) 77'; Korolovszky (yellow card) 82'	Report	Kiss (yellow card) 25'; Rezes (yellow card) 41'; Komlósi (yellow card) 52'; Mijadinoski (yellow card) 65'; Malinauskas (yellow card) 71'	Stadium: Rohonci úti Stadion; Attendance: 3,000; Referee: Viktor Kassai

26 November 2010 16	Lombard-Pápa TFC	1–1	Debreceni VSC	Pápa
17:00 CEST	A. Farkas (yellow card) 20'; Rajnay 84'	Report	Varga (yellow card) 21'; Bódi (yellow card) 41'; Laczkó (yellow card) 56'; Mijadinoski 71'; Fodor (yellow card) 76' (yellow-red card) 90'	Stadium: Stadion Várkerti; Attendance: 1,500; Referee: István Vad

8 March 2011 17	Debreceni VSC	2–1	Paksi SE	Debrecen
18:00 CEST	Czvitkovics (yellow card) 40' (goal) 83' (pen.); Fodor (yellow card) 43'; Éger 59' (o.g.); Varga (yellow card) 70'	Report	Éger (yellow card) 50' (goal) 57'; Fiola (yellow card) 79'; Sipeki (yellow card) 90'	Stadium: Stadion Oláh Gábor Út; Attendance: 3,000; Referee: Alvaro Miquel Garcia

4 March 2011 18	Kecskeméti TE	3–0	Debreceni VSC	Kecskemét
17:00 CEST	Alempijević (yellow card) 31'; Balogh 35' (pen.); Vujović 36' (pen.); Salami 39' (o.g.); Čukić (yellow card) 61'	Report	Ramos (yellow card) 33'; Nikolov (yellow card) 34'; Czvitkovics (yellow card) 40'; Illés (yellow card) 48'; B. Farkas (yellow card) 89'	Stadium: Széktói Stadion; Attendance: 3,000; Referee: István Vad

12 March 2011 19	Debreceni VSC	2–2	Budapest Honvéd FC	Debrecen
15:00 CEST	Czvitkovics 45'; Salami 47'; Bernáth (yellow card) 78'	Report	Debreceni 21'; Hajdú 62'; Hidi (yellow card) 65'; Lovrić (yellow card) 75'	Stadium: Stadion Oláh Gábor Út; Attendance: 3,500; Referee: Sándor Andó-Szabó

18 March 2011 20	Videoton FC Fehérvár	2–1	Debreceni VSC	Székesfehérvár
19:00 CEST	Lencse 61'; Alves 72'; Gosztonyi (yellow card) 79'	Report	Szakály (yellow card) 32'; Ramos (yellow card) 60'; Coulibaly 65'; Varga (yellow card) 86'	Stadium: Stadion Sóstói; Attendance: 4,848; Referee: Ádám Németh

3 April 2011 21	Debreceni VSC	1–1	Győri ETO FC	Debrecen
17:30 CEST	Czvitkovics 50' (pen.); Bernáth (yellow card) 75'; Mardare (yellow card) 80'; Kabát (yellow card) 87'	Report	Pilibaitis (yellow card) 49'; Dinjar 60'; Ceolin (yellow card) 84'; Dudás (yellow card) 91'	Stadium: Stadion Oláh Gábor Út; Attendance: 5,000; Referee: Tamás Bognár

10 April 2011 22	Újpest FC	2–2	Debreceni VSC	Budapest
17:30 CEST	Ahjupera 45' 82'; Tajthy (yellow card) 71'	Report	Coulibaly 12' (yellow card) 90'; Varga (yellow card) 43'; Mijadinoski (yellow card) 46'; Ramos (yellow card) 52'; Czvitkovics 64' (pen.)	Stadium: Szusza Ferenc Stadium; Attendance: 4,000; Referee: Sándor Andó-Szabó

16 April 2011 23	Debreceni VSC	2–3	BFC Siófok	Debrecen
15:00 CEST	Mardare (yellow card) 16'; Varga (yellow card) 30'; Mijadinoski (red card) 45'; Coulibaly 55'; Bódi 59'	Report	Délczeg (yellow card) 8' (goal) 14'; Homma 45'; Tusori 52'; Graszl (yellow card) 58'; Lukács (yellow card) 80'	Stadium: Stadion Oláh Gábor Út; Attendance: 3,000; Referee: Zoltán Iványi

23 April 2011 24	Vasas SC	1–5	Debreceni VSC	Budapest
17:15 CEST	Kovács (yellow card) 74'; Németh 70' (yellow card) 87'	Report	Šimac 24'; Bódi 31' 54'; Coulibaly 47' 81'	Stadium: Stadion Rudolf Illovszky; Attendance: 1,500; Referee: István Vad

27 April 2011 25	Debreceni VSC	3–1	MTK Budapest FC	Debrecen
18:30 CEST	Šimac 27'; Ramos 28'; Coulibaly 75'	Report	Pátkai 15'	Stadium: Stadion Oláh Gábor Út; Attendance: 3,500; Referee: Szabolcs Szilasi

1 May 2011 26	Ferencvárosi TC	1–1	Debreceni VSC	Budapest
17:30 CEST	Morales (yellow card) 28'; Balog (yellow card) 36'; Tóth (yellow card) 59'; Heinz (yellow card) 79'; Mijadinoski 86' (o.g.)	Report	Szakály (yellow card) 33'; Coulibaly (yellow card) 40' (goal) 56'; Bódi (yellow card) 76'; Ramos (yellow card) 77'; Dombi (yellow card) 92'	Stadium: Stadion Albert Flórián; Attendance: 5,000; Referee: Zoltán Iványi

7 May 2011 27	Kaposvári Rákóczi FC	0–0	Debreceni VSC	Kaposvár
17:30 CEST	Okuka (yellow card) 38'	Report	Bódi (yellow card) 32'; Illés (yellow card) 71'; Coulibaly (yellow card) 72'	Stadium: Stadion Kaposvár Rákóczi; Attendance: 2,000; Referee: Viktor Kassai

10 May 2011 28	Szolnoki MÁV FC	1–2	Debreceni VSC	Szolnok
17:30 CEST	Đurović (yellow card) 43'; Tchami 49'; Szalai (yellow card) 63'; Némedi (yellow card) 91'	Report	Szakály 9'; Coulibaly 19'; Ramos (yellow card) 64'	Stadium: Tiszaligeti Stadion; Attendance: 1,000; Referee: Ádám Farkas

13 May 2011 29	Zalaegerszegi TE	1–1	Debreceni VSC	Zalaegerszeg
19:00 CEST	Bogunović (yellow card) 33'; Kamber (yellow card) 44'; Panikvar (yellow card) 65'; Miljatovič (yellow card) 68'; Ramos 71' (o.g.)	Report	Nagy (yellow card) 51'; Bódi 69' (pen.); Ramos (yellow card) 90'	Stadium: ZTE Arena; Attendance: 2,000; Referee: Zsolt Szabó

22 May 2011 30	Debreceni VSC	1–2	Szombathelyi Haladás	Debrecen
17:30 CEST	Coulibaly 26' (pen.); Szakály (yellow card) 32'; Illés (yellow card) 49'; Ramos (yellow card) 65'	Report	Iszlai (yellow card) 27'; Sipos 57'; Lengyel (yellow card) 59'; Halmosi 67'; Oross (yellow card) 87'	Stadium: Stadion Oláh Gábor Út; Attendance: 5,000; Referee: József Berger

=== Hungarian Cup ===
27 October 2010 4	Nagyecsed RSE	1–1 (7–8 p)	Debreceni VSC	Nagyecsed
14:30 CEST	Marcsek 42'; Bancsi (yellow card) 64'; Doros (yellow card) 90+2'	Report	Pavlović (yellow card) 10'; Ramos (red card) 41'; Szilágyi 53'; Szűcs (yellow card) 59'; Lucas (yellow card) 63'; Máté (yellow card) 90+2'	Attendance: 1,000; Referee: Róbert Nagy

10 November 2010 Round of 16 (1st leg)	Debreceni VSC	0–3	Kecskeméti TE	Debrecen
17:30 CEST	Kabát (yellow card) 40'; Máté (red card) 47'	Report	Litsingi 23'; Alempijević 43', 50' (yellow card) 64'; Némedi (yellow card) 61'; Bori (yellow card) 90'	Stadium: Stadion Oláh Gábor Út; Attendance: 500; Referee: Szabolcs Szilasi

1 March 2011 Round of 16 (2nd leg)	Kecskeméti TE	3–1 (6–1 agg.)	Debreceni VSC	Kecskemét
18:00 CEST	Tököli 13'; Litsingi 35'; Ebala (yellow card) 75'; Foxi 81'	Report	Kabát 45'	Stadium: Széktói Stadion; Attendance: 1,000; Referee: József Erdős

=== League Cup ===
19 February 2011 Quarter-final (1st leg)	Debreceni VSC	2–0	Kecskeméti TE	Debrecen
14:00 CEST	Varga 24'; Illés 65'; Ramos (yellow card) 74'	Report	Čukić (yellow card) 52'; Balogh (yellow card) 84'; Alempijević (yellow card) 84'; Radanović (red card) 90'	Stadium: Egyetemi Sporttelep; Attendance: 1,500; Referee: Ádám Radványi

22 February 2011 Quarter-final (2nd leg)	Kecskeméti TE	1–0 (1–2 agg.)	Debreceni VSC	Kecskemét
13:45 CEST	Koszó (yellow card) 26'; Ebala (yellow card) 30'; I. Farkas (red card) 41'; Foxi (yellow card) 58'; Vujović (yellow card) 59'; Litsingi 81' (pen.); Alempijević (yellow card) 89'	Report	Mokánszki (yellow card) 17'; Fodor (yellow card) 18'; Nagy (red card) 80'	Stadium: Széktói Stadion; Attendance: 400; Referee: János Takács

27 March 2011 Semi-final (1st leg)	Szombathelyi Haladás	0–2	Debreceni VSC	Szombathely
17:30 CEST	G. I Nagy (yellow card) 44'; P. Tóth (yellow card) 61'; Csontos (yellow card) 84'	Report	Yannick (yellow card) 8'; Coulibaly 45' (pen.), 62'; Ramos (yellow card) 71'; Fodor (yellow card) 85'	Stadium: Rohonci úti Stadion; Attendance: 500; Referee: Szabolcs Szilasi

30 March 2011 Semi-final (2nd leg)	Debreceni VSC	0–0 (2–0 agg.)	Szombathelyi Haladás	Debrecen
16:30 CEST	Spitzmüller (yellow card) 47'	Report		Stadium: Stadion Oláh Gábor Út; Attendance: 2,500; Referee: Zoltán J. Kovács

6 April 2011 Final (1st leg)	Debreceni VSC	2–1	Paksi SE	Debrecen
17:30 CEST	Salami 14'; Šimac (yellow card) 27'; Yannick 41' (yellow card) 60'; Ramos (yellow card) 70'; B. Farkas (yellow card) 90'	Report	Sifter (yellow card) 6'; Vári 23' (pen.); Gévay (yellow card) 25'; Sipeki (yellow card) 31'; Fiola (yellow card) 91'	Stadium: Stadion Oláh Gábor Út; Attendance: 2,500; Referee: Ádám Farkas

13 April 2011 Final (2nd leg)	Paksi SE	3–0 (4–2 agg.)	Debreceni VSC	Paks
17:30 CEST	Magasföldi 35', 72'; Bartha 65'	Report	Kabát (yellow card) 12'; Nikolov (yellow card) 34'; Šimac (yellow card) 60'; Ramos (yellow card) 89'	Stadium: Stadion PSE; Attendance: 3,000; Referee: Ádám Németh

=== Champions League ===
==== Qualifying round ====
13 July 2010 Q2 Leg 1	FC Levadia Tallinn (Estonia)	1–1	(Hungary) Debreceni VSC	Tallinn
18:00 CEST	Morozov (yellow card) 54'; Neemelo 59'	Report	Komlósi (yellow card) 6'; Z. Nagy (yellow card) 30'; Fodor (yellow card) 63'; Rezes 90'	Stadium: Kadrioru Stadium; Attendance: 1,800; Referee: (Belarus) Aleksei Kulbakov

21 July 2010 Q2 Leg 2	Debreceni VSC (Hungary)	3–2 (4–3 agg.)	(Estonia) FC Levadia Tallinn	Debrecen
20:00 CEST	Coulibaly 24'; Yannick 32'; Szakály 55'; Rezes (yellow card) 57'	Report	Nahk 3' (yellow card) 60'; Malov (yellow card) 45+1' (yellow-red card) 74'; Morozov (yellow card) 47'; Leitan 53'; Kalimullin (yellow card) 67'	Stadium: Stadion Oláh Gábor Út; Attendance: 8,000; Referee: (Norway) Tom Harald Hagen

28 July 2010 Q3 Leg 1	Debreceni VSC (Hungary)	0–2	(Switzerland) FC Basel	Budapest
20:00 CEST		Report	Stocker 34' (yellow card) 84'; Cabral (yellow card) 50'; Xhaka 90+2'	Stadium: Szusza Ferenc Stadium; Attendance: 5,000; Referee: (Spain) César Muñiz Fernández

4 August 2010 Q3 Leg 2	FC Basel (Switzerland)	3–1 (5–1 agg.)	(Hungary) Debreceni VSC	Basel
19:45 CEST	Inkoom (yellow card) 11'; Atan 26'; Chipperfield 59'; Shaqiri 64'	Report	Coulibaly 74'	Stadium: St. Jakob-Park; Attendance: 18,000; Referee: (Russia) Vladislav Bezborodov

=== Europa League ===
==== Qualifying round ====
19 August 2010 Play off Leg 1	Debreceni VSC (Hungary)	2–0	(Bulgaria) PFC Litex Lovech	Nyíregyháza
19:00 CEST	Coulibaly 22'; Laczkó 33'; Bernáth (yellow card) 76'; József Varga (yellow card) 90+1'	Report	Barthe (yellow card) 35' (yellow-red card) 69'	Stadium: Városi Stadion; Attendance: 8,500; Referee: (Cyprus) Leontios Trattou

19 August 2010 Play off Leg 2	PFC Litex Lovech (Bulgaria)	1–2 (1–4 agg.)	(Hungary) Debreceni VSC	Lovech
19:00 CEST	Niflore 68'	Report	Laczkó (yellow card) 24'; Yannick 53'; Mijadinoski (yellow card) 58'; Czvitkovics 81'	Stadium: Lovech Stadium; Attendance: 2,500; Referee: (Poland) Robert Malek

==== Group stage ====
16 September 2010 1	Debreceni VSC (Hungary)	0–5	(Ukraine) FC Metalist Kharkiv	Budapest
21:05 CEST	Kabát (red card) 42'; Nagy (yellow card) 66'	Report	Edmar 24', 74'; Xavier 34'; Villagra (yellow card) 41'; Fininho (yellow card) 45+1' (goal) 77'; Valyayev 89'	Stadium: Stadium Puskás Ferenc; Attendance: 8,000; Referee: (North Macedonia) Aleksandar Stavrev

30 September 2010 2	Sampdoria (Italy)	1–0	(Hungary) Debreceni VSC	Genoa
19:00 CEST	Pazzini 18' (pen.); Lucchini (yellow card) 57'	Report	Mijadinoski (yellow card) 18'; Laczkó (yellow card) 18'; Kiss (yellow card) 61'	Stadium: Stadio Luigi Ferraris; Attendance: 12,159; Referee: (Czech Republic) Libor Kovařík

21 October 2010 3	Debreceni VSC (Hungary)	1–2	(Netherlands) PSV Eindhoven	Budapest
19:00 CEST	Mijadinoski 35'	Report	Berg (yellow card) 34'; Engelaar 40'; Dzsudzsák 66'	Stadium: Stadium Puskás Ferenc; Attendance: 18,000; Referee: (Denmark) Nicolai Vollquartz

4 November 2010 4	PSV Eindhoven (Netherlands)	3–0	(Hungary) Debreceni VSC	Eindhoven
21:05 CEST	Afellay 22'; Bouma (yellow card) 38'; Reis 44'; Wuytens 88'	Report	Laczkó (yellow card) 64'; Mijadinoski (yellow card) 90'	Stadium: Philips Stadion; Attendance: 17,000; Referee: (Northern Ireland) Mark Courtney

1 December 2010 5	FC Metalist Kharkiv (Ukraine)	2–1	(Hungary) Debreceni VSC	Kharkiv
19:00 CEST	Bódi 52' (o.g.); Edmar (yellow card) 57'; Oliynyk 88'; Obradović (yellow card) 90+1'	Report	Šimac (yellow card) 22'; Czvitkovics 48'; Ramos (yellow card) 90+1'	Stadium: Metalist Stadium; Attendance: 32,000; Referee: (Sweden) Daniel Stalhammer

16 December 2010 6	Debreceni VSC (Hungary)	2–0	(Italy) Sampdoria	Budapest
21:05 CEST	Kabát 48', 86'; Bódi (yellow card) 78'	Report	Rossini (yellow card) 81'	Stadium: Stadium Puskás Ferenc; Attendance: 5,500; Referee: (Russia) Stanislav Sukhina

===== Classification =====
Pos	Team	Pld	W	D	L	GF	GA	GD	Pts	Qualification	PSV	MET	SAM	DEB
1	(Netherlands) PSV Eindhoven	6	4	2	0	10	3	+7	14	Advance to knockout phase	—	0–0	1–1	3–0
2	(Ukraine) Metalist Kharkiv	6	3	2	1	9	4	+5	11	Advance to knockout phase	0–2	—	2–1	2–1
3	(Italy) Sampdoria	6	1	2	3	4	7	−3	5		1–2	0–0	—	1–0
4	(Hungary) Debrecen	6	1	0	5	4	13	−9	3		1–2	0–5	2–0	—

Source: Soccerway

== Statistics ==
=== Appearances and goals ===
Last updated on 22 May 2011.

No.	Pos	Nat	Player	Total		NB 1		European Cups		Hungarian Cup		League Cup	
No.	Pos	Nat	Player	Apps	Goals	Apps	Goals	Apps	Goals	Apps	Goals	Apps	Goals
2	DF	(Hungary) HUN	István Szűcs	11	0	5	0	0	0	2	0	4	0
4	DF	(Germany) GER	Dajan Šimac	29	4	20	4	5	0	1	0	3	0
5	MF	(Hungary) HUN	Gyula Illés	8	1	7	0	0	0	0	0	1	1
6	MF	(Honduras) HON	Luis Ramos	26	1	19	1	2	0	1	0	4	0
7	MF	(Hungary) HUN	Tibor Dombi	29	1	20	1	7	0	0	0	2	0
8	DF	(Hungary) HUN	Balázs Nikolov	6	0	3	0	0	0	0	0	3	0
10	FW	(Hungary) HUN	Balázs Farkas	17	0	10	0	2	0	1	0	4	0
11	FW	(Hungary) HUN	Péter Kabát	29	7	16	4	8	2	3	1	2	0
13	DF	(Hungary) HUN	Norbert Kardos	1	0	0	0	0	0	1	0	0	0
14	FW	(Nigeria) NGA	Eugène Salami	12	2	9	1	0	0	0	0	3	1
15	MF	(Hungary) HUN	László Rezes	9	1	4	0	5	1	0	0	0	0
16	DF	(Hungary) HUN	Ádám Komlósi	23	0	12	0	7	0	1	0	3	0
18	DF	(Hungary) HUN	Péter Máté	4	0	1	0	1	0	2	0	0	0
19	FW	(Brazil) BRA	Vinicius Galvão Leal	3	0	0	0	0	0	1	0	2	0
20	MF	(Cameroon) CMR	Mbengono Yannick	39	4	22	1	11	2	1	0	5	1
21	DF	(Hungary) HUN	Marcell Fodor	27	0	16	0	5	0	1	0	5	0
22	DF	(Hungary) HUN	Csaba Bernáth	22	0	12	0	6	0	3	0	1	0
23	FW	(Hungary) HUN	Péter Szilágyi	12	2	10	1	0	0	2	1	0	0
24	DF	(North Macedonia) MKD	Mirsad Mijadinoski	38	2	23	1	12	1	1	0	2	0
25	FW	(Hungary) HUN	Norbert Mokánszki	5	0	0	0	0	0	0	0	5	0
27	MF	(Hungary) HUN	Ádám Bódi	35	5	20	5	7	0	2	0	6	0
28	DF	(Hungary) HUN	Zoltán Nagy	27	0	17	0	6	0	0	0	4	0
29	DF	(Hungary) HUN	István Spitzmüller	12	0	5	0	0	0	3	0	4	0
30	MF	(Hungary) HUN	Zoltán Kiss	22	1	9	1	12	0	1	0	0	0
31	GK	(Lithuania) LTU	Mindaugas Malinauskas	23	-38	14	-21	9	-17	0	0	0	0
32	MF	(Serbia) SRB	Predrag Pavlović	2	0	0	0	0	0	2	0	0	0
33	MF	(Hungary) HUN	József Varga	36	1	21	0	11	0	1	0	3	1
38	FW	(Hungary) HUN	Szabolcs Csorba	1	0	0	0	0	0	0	0	1	0
39	FW	(France) FRA	Adamo Coulibaly	44	19	26	14	11	3	2	0	5	2
45	GK	(Serbia) SRB	Nenad Novaković	11	-15	8	-11	0	0	0	0	3	-4
46	FW	(Cameroon) CMR	Etogo Essama	1	0	0	0	0	0	0	0	1	0
50	DF	(Romania) ROU	Ştefan Mardare	5	0	4	0	0	0	0	0	1	0
55	MF	(Hungary) HUN	Péter Szakály	41	5	27	4	10	1	1	0	3	0
69	MF	(Hungary) HUN	Mihály Korhut	3	0	1	0	0	0	2	0	0	0
70	MF	(Hungary) HUN	Tamás Kulcsár	11	1	5	1	3	0	1	0	2	0
77	MF	(Hungary) HUN	Péter Czvitkovics	39	12	25	10	12	2	1	0	1	0
79	FW	(Hungary) HUN	János Ferenczi	1	0	0	0	0	0	0	0	1	0
86	DF	(Hungary) HUN	Zsolt Laczkó	21	2	12	1	8	1	1	0	0	0
87	GK	(Hungary) HUN	István Verpecz	18	-23	9	-11	3	-5	3	-6	3	-1
91	FW	(Hungary) HUN	Ádám Balajti	1	0	1	0	0	0	0	0	0	0
99	FW	(Brazil) BRA	Marcolini Lucas	3	0	0	0	0	0	1	0	2	0

=== Top scorers ===
Includes all competitive matches. The list is sorted by shirt number when total goals are equal.

Last updated on 22 May 2011

Position	Nation	Number	Name	Soproni Liga	European Cups	Hungarian Cup	League Cup	Total
1	(France) (Mali)	39	Adamo Coulibaly	14	3	0	2	19
2	(Hungary)	77	Péter Czvitkovics	10	2	0	0	12
3	(Hungary)	11	Péter Kabát	4	2	1	0	7
4	(Hungary)	55	Péter Szakály	4	1	0	0	5
5	(Hungary)	27	Ádám Bódi	5	0	0	0	5
6	(Germany) (Croatia)	4	Dajan Šimac	4	0	0	0	4
7	(Cameroon)	20	Mbengono Yannick	1	2	0	1	4
8	(Hungary)	86	Zsolt Laczkó	1	1	0	0	2
9	(North Macedonia) (Switzerland)	24	Mirsad Mijadinoski	1	1	0	0	2
10	(Hungary)	23	Péter Szilágyi	1	0	1	0	2
11	(Nigeria)	14	Eugène Salami	1	0	0	1	2
12	(Hungary)	15	László Rezes	0	1	0	0	1
13	(Hungary)	70	Tamás Kulcsár	1	0	0	0	1
14	(Hungary)	30	Zoltán Kiss	1	0	0	0	1
15	(Hungary)	7	Tibor Dombi	1	0	0	0	1
16	(Honduras)	6	Luis Ramos	1	0	0	0	1
17	(Hungary)	33	József Varga	0	0	0	1	1
18	(Hungary)	5	Gyula Illés	0	0	0	1	1
/	/	/	Own Goals	3	0	0	0	3
			TOTALS	53	13	2	6	74

=== Disciplinary record ===
Includes all competitive matches. Players with 1 card or more included only.

Last updated on 22 May 2011

Position	Nation	Number	Name	Soproni Liga		European Cups		Hungarian Cup		League Cup		Total (Hu Total)	
Position	Nation	Number	Name	Booked	Sent off (straight red)	Booked	Sent off (straight red)	Booked	Sent off (straight red)	Booked	Sent off (straight red)	Booked	Sent off (straight red)
DF	(Hungary)	2	István Szűcs	0	0	0	0	1	0	0	0	1 (0)	0 (0)
DF	(Germany)	4	Dajan Šimac	2	0	1	0	0	0	2	0	5 (2)	0 (0)
MF	(Hungary)	5	Gyula Illés	3	0	0	0	0	0	0	0	3 (3)	0 (0)
MF	(Honduras)	6	Luis Ramos	9	0	1	0	0	1	4	0	14 (9)	1 (0)
MF	(Hungary)	7	Tibor Dombi	2	0	0	0	0	0	0	0	2 (2)	0 (0)
DF	(Hungary)	8	Balázs Nikolov	1	0	0	0	0	0	1	0	2 (1)	0 (0)
FW	(Hungary)	10	Balázs Farkas	1	1	0	0	0	0	1	0	2 (1)	1 (1)
FW	(Hungary)	11	Péter Kabát	2	1	0	1	1	0	1	0	4 (2)	2 (1)
MF	(Hungary)	15	László Rezes	1	0	1	0	0	0	0	0	2 (1)	0 (0)
DF	(Hungary)	16	Ádám Komlósi	4	0	1	0	0	0	0	0	5 (4)	0 (0)
DF	(Hungary)	18	Péter Máté	0	0	0	0	1	1	0	0	1 (0)	1 (0)
MF	(Cameroon)	20	Mbengono Yannick	0	1	0	0	0	0	2	0	2 (0)	1 (1)
DF	(Hungary)	21	Marcell Fodor	2	1	1	0	0	0	2	0	5 (2)	1 (1)
DF	(Hungary)	22	Csaba Bernáth	2	0	1	0	0	0	0	0	3 (2)	0 (0)
DF	(North Macedonia)	24	Mirsad Mijadinoski	2	1	3	0	0	0	0	0	5 (2)	1 (1)
MF	(Hungary)	27	Ádám Bódi	3	0	1	0	0	0	0	0	4 (3)	0 (0)
DF	(Hungary)	28	Zoltán Nagy	2	0	2	0	0	0	0	1	4 (2)	1 (0)
DF	(Hungary)	29	István Spitzmüller	1	0	0	0	0	0	1	0	2 (1)	0 (0)
MF	(Hungary)	30	Zoltán Kiss	2	1	1	0	0	0	0	0	3 (2)	1 (1)
GK	(Lithuania)	31	M. Malinauskas	1	0	0	0	0	0	0	0	1 (1)	0 (0)
MF	(Serbia)	32	Predrag Pavlović	0	0	0	0	1	0	0	0	1 (0)	0 (0)
MF	(Hungary)	33	József Varga	9	0	1	0	0	0	0	0	10 (9)	0 (0)
MF	(Hungary)	36	Norbert Mokánszki	0	0	0	0	0	0	1	0	1 (0)	0 (0)
FW	(France)	39	Adamo Coulibaly	3	0	0	0	0	0	0	0	3 (3)	0 (0)
DF	(Romania)	50	Ştefan Mardare	2	0	0	0	0	0	0	0	2 (2)	0 (0)
MF	(Hungary)	55	Péter Szakály	3	0	0	0	0	0	0	0	3 (3)	0 (0)
MF	(Hungary)	77	Péter Czvitkovics	2	0	0	0	0	0	0	0	2 (2)	0 (0)
DF	(Hungary)	86	Zsolt Laczkó	4	0	3	0	0	0	0	0	7 (4)	0 (0)
MF	(Brazil)	99	Lucas	0	0	0	0	1	0	0	0	1 (0)	0 (0)
			TOTALS	63	6	17	1	5	2	15	1	100 (63)	10 (6)

=== Overall ===
Games played	51 (30 Soproni Liga, 12 European Cups, 3 Hungarian Cup and 6 Hungarian League Cup)
Games won	19 (12 Soproni Liga, 4 European Cups, 0 Hungarian Cup and 3 Hungarian League Cup)
Games drawn	13 (10 Soproni Liga, 1 European Cups, 2 Hungarian Cup and 0 Hungarian League Cup)
Games lost	19 (8 Soproni Liga, 7 European Cups, 2 Hungarian Cup and 2 Hungarian League Cup)
Goals scored	74
Goals conceded	77
Goal difference	−3
Yellow cards	100
Red cards	10
Worst discipline	(Honduras) Luis Ramos (14 (yellow card) , 1 (red card) )
Best result	6–2 (H) v Kecskeméti TE – Nemzeti Bajnokság I – 14-08-2010
Best result	4–0 (H) v Kecskeméti TE – Nemzeti Bajnokság I – 07-11-2010
Best result	5–1 (A) v Vasas SC – Nemzeti Bajnokság I – 23-04-2011
Worst result	0–5 (H) v FC Metalist Kharkiv – UEFA Europa League – 16-09-2010
Most appearances	(France) (Mali) Adamo Coulibaly (44 appearances)
Top scorer	(France) (Mali) Adamo Coulibaly (19 goals)
Points	70/153 (45.75%)

Last updated: 22 May 2011
Source: Debreceni VSC
