= Adnan Alisic =

Dutch professional footballer

Personal information
- Date of birth: 10 February 1984 (age 42)
- Place of birth: Rotterdam, Netherlands
- Position: Midfielder

Senior career*
Years	Team	Apps	(Gls)
2003–2006	Utrecht	3	(0)
2006–2007	Dordrecht	34	(5)
2007–2011	Excelsior	81	(7)
2011–2012	Debrecen	0	(0)
2012–2015	Dordrecht	53	(8)
2015–2016	GVVV	14	(1)
2016–2018	Leonidas		
2018-2021	RVV COAL		
- * Club domestic league appearances and goals

Adnan Alisic (born 10 February 1984) is a Dutch football coach and former professional player who played as a midfielder.

== Playing career ==
Born in Rotterdam, Alisic made his professional debut for Utrecht on 30 November 2003, replacing Donny de Groot in the 80th minute of the Eredivisie home match against Roda JC, which Utrecht won 3–1. After failing to break into the Utrecht first-team, Alisic dropped down a division to sign for Dordrecht in 2006. After a successful season in the second tier of Dutch football, Alisic signed for Eredivisie club Excelsior in 2007, before moving to Hungarian club Debrecen in July 2011. Alisic returned to Dordrecht in summer 2012 after an unsuccessful spell in Hungary.

In summer 2015 he turned semi-pro when joining GVVV.

== Coaching career ==
He was hired as assistant coach at amateur side VV Steenbergen for the 2021-22 season.
