= Marcell Fodor =

Hungarian football player

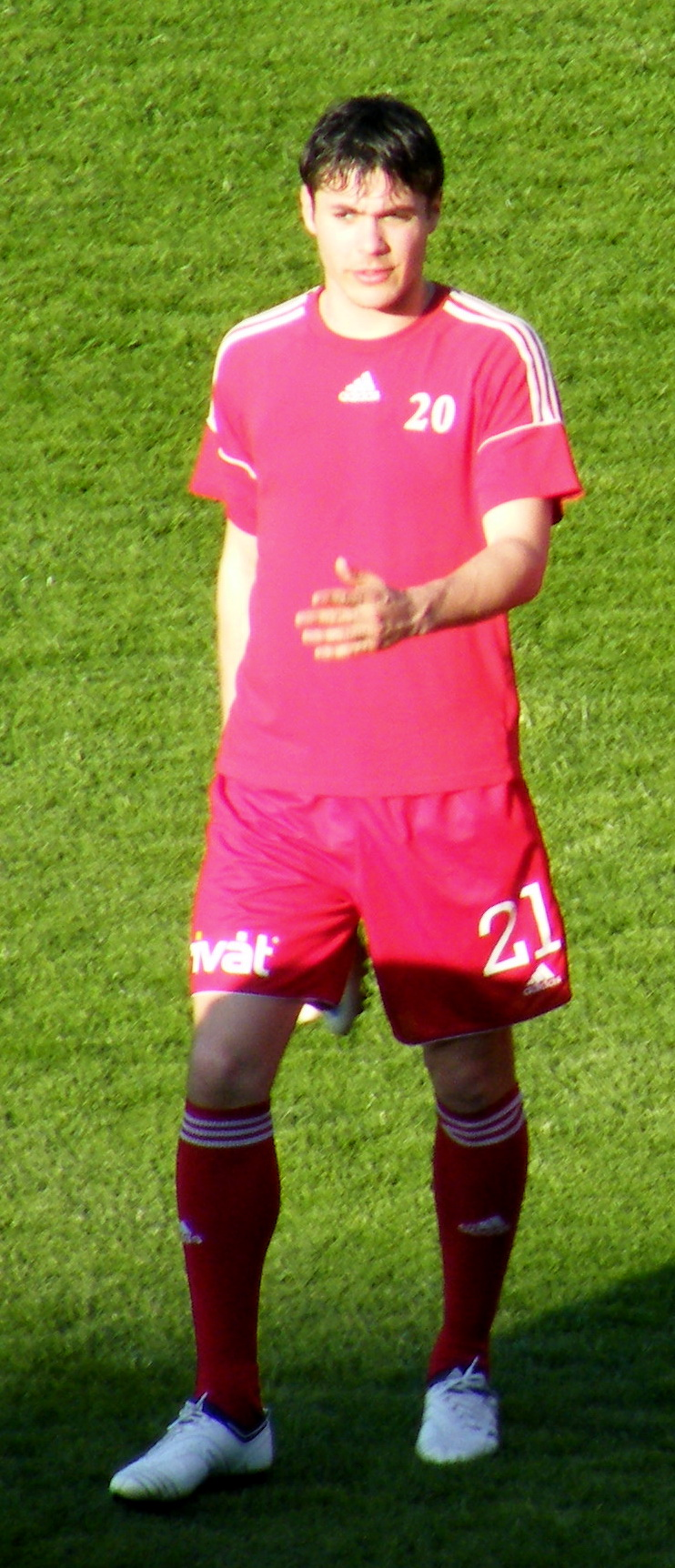

Personal information
- Date of birth: 27 October 1987 (age 39)
- Place of birth: Székesfehérvár, Hungary
- Height: 1.83 m (6 ft 0 in)
- Position: Left back

Team information
- Current team: Puskás Akadémia II

Youth career
- 2002–2004: Videoton

Senior career*
| Years | Team | Apps | (Gls) |
| 2004–2005 | Videoton | 10 | (0) |
| 2005–2006 | Újpest | 0 | (0) |
| 2005–2006 | → Diósgyőr (loan) | 9 | (0) |
| 2006–2007 | Felcsút | 14 | (0) |
| 2007–2008 | Diósgyőr | 6 | (0) |
| 2008–2012 | Debrecen | 41 | (0) |
| 2012–2014 | Újpest | 4 | (0) |
| 2012–2013 | → Siófok (loan) | 17 | (0) |
| 2013–2014 | → Ajka (loan) | 29 | (0) |
| 2014–2016 | Zalaegerszeg | 33 | (0) |
| 2016–2017 | Ajka | 33 | (0) |
| 2017–2020 | Kaposvár | 59 | (1) |
| 2020– | Puskás Akadémia II | 44 | (0) |

International career
| 2005–2006 | Hungary U-19 | 5 | (0) |
| 2007–2008 | Hungary U-21 | 1 | (0) |
- * Club domestic league appearances and goals as of 4 May 2022

Marcell Fodor (born 27 October 1987) is a Hungarian football defender who plays for Puskás Akadémia II.

== Honours ==
Debreceni VSC

- Nemzeti Bajnokság I: 2009–10
