= Dajan Šimac =

Croatian-German footballer

Personal information
- Date of birth: 4 January 1982 (age 44)
- Place of birth: Bingen am Rhein, West Germany
- Height: 1.92 m (6 ft 4 in)
- Position: Defender

Youth career
- 1989–1996: Blau-Weiß Münster-Sarmsheim
- 1996–2000: BFV Hassia Bingen
- 2000–2001: 1. FC Kaiserslautern

Senior career*
Years	Team	Apps	(Gls)
2001–2003	1. FC Kaiserslautern II	39	(2)
2003–2004	Greuther Fürth	1	(0)
2004–2009	SV Wehen Wiesbaden	138	(6)
2009–2010	FSV Frankfurt	8	(0)
2010–2013	Debrecen	65	(5)
2013	Denizlispor	10	(0)
2014–2015	Jagodina	16	(0)
2015	Radnik Sesvete	14	(0)
2016	Stupnik		
2017	Samobor		
2017–2018	Tekstilac-Ravnice		(?)
2018–2020	Marsonia		

International career
2003	Croatia U-20	1	(0)
- * Club domestic league appearances and goals

Dajan Šimac (born 4 January 1982) is a Croatian former professional footballer who played as a defender. He also holds German citizenship.

== Club career ==
=== Germany ===
Born in Bingen am Rhein, West Germany, Šimac played in the youth teams of Blau-Weiß Münster-Sarmsheim (1989–1996) and BFV Hassia Bingen (1996–2000). He made his debut as senior playing with 1. FC Kaiserslautern II in the 2001–02 season. After two seasons with them in the Regionalliga Süd. In summer 2003 he moved to SpVgg Greuther Fürth however he played only one match in the 2003–04 2. Bundesliga. During the winter break of that season he moved to SV Wehen Wiesbaden. He played there for five-and-a-half seasons making 138 league appearances and scoring six goals. He will play with Wehen in the Regionalliga Süd until 2007 when they were promoted to the 2. Bundesliga and he played with them two seasons in the second German level (56 appearances and six goals). In summer 2007 he moved to another 2. Bundesliga side, FSV Frankfurt and stay with them one season.

=== Debrecen ===
In summer 2010 Šimac moved to Hungary by signing with Debreceni VSC. On 1 May 2012, he won the Hungarian Cup with Debrecen by beating MTK Budapest on penalty shoot-out in the 2011–12 season. This was the fifth Hungarian Cup trophy for Debrecen.

On 12 May 2012, Šimac won the Hungarian League title with Debrecen after beating Pécs in the 28th round of the Hungarian League by 4–0 at the Oláh Gábor út Stadium which resulted the sixth Hungarian League title for the Hajdús.

=== Denizlispor ===
In summer 2013 Šimac left Debrecen after three years, and moved to Turkey by signing with Denizlispor. He made 10 appearances with them in the first half of the 2013–14 TFF First League.

=== Jagodina ===
During the winter break of the 2013–14 season, Šimac left Denizlispor and moved to Serbia signing a 6-months contract with SuperLiga side FK Jagodina.

=== Later career in Croatia ===
After his spell in Serbia, he stayed in the region and debuted for the first time in his home-country Croatia when he joined Radnik Sesvete in summer 2015 playing in second level. Later he played with Stupnik and Samobor. In season 2017–18 he played with NK Tekstilac-Ravnice.

== International career ==
Šimac played one match for the Croatian U-20 team in 2003.

== Career statistics ==
As of 7 May 2013

Appearances and goals by club, season and competition
Club	Season	League			National cup		League cup		Europe		Total	
Club	Season	Division	Apps	Goals	Apps	Goals	Apps	Goals	Apps	Goals	Apps	Goals
Debreceni VSC	2010–11	Nemzeti Bajnokság I	20	4	1	0	3	0	5	0	29	4
Debreceni VSC	2011–12	Nemzeti Bajnokság I	25	1	5	0	0	0	0	0	30	1
Debreceni VSC	2012–13	Nemzeti Bajnokság I	20	0	3	1	3	0	6	0	32	1
Debreceni VSC	Total		65	5	9	1	6	0	11	0	91	6
Career total			65	5	9	1	6	0	11	0	91	6

== Honours ==
Wehen Wiesbaden

- Regionalliga Süd: 2006–07

Debreceni VSC

- Hungarian Championship: 2011–12
- Hungarian Cup: 2012, 2013
- Hungarian Supercup: 2011
- Hungarian Supercup runner-up: 2013

Jagodina

- Serbian Cup runner-up: 2014
