= Luis Ramos (Honduran footballer) =

Honduran footballer (born 1985)

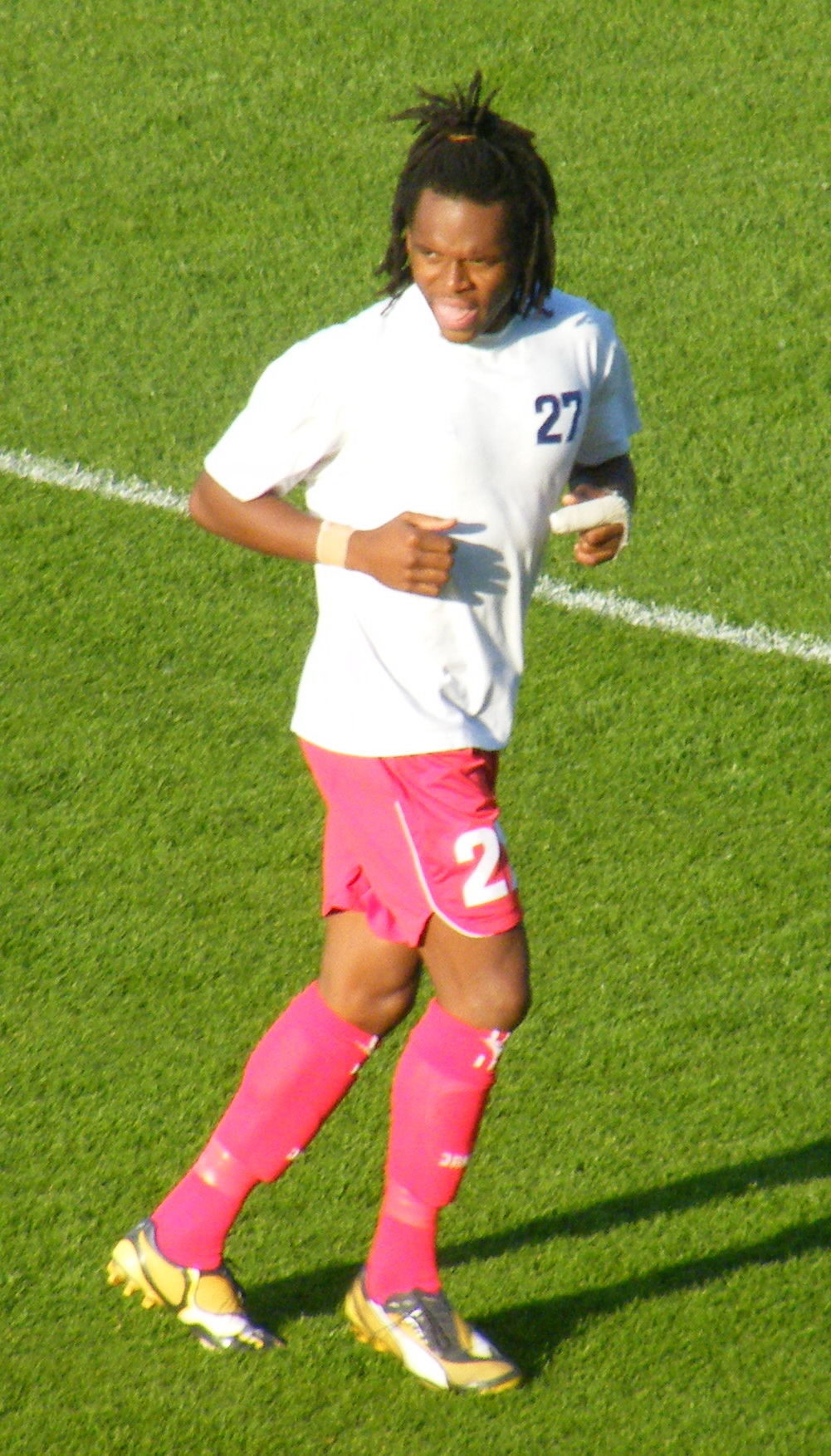

Personal information
- Full name: Luis Arcangel Ramos Colon
- Date of birth: 11 April 1985 (age 41)
- Place of birth: San Pedro Sula, Honduras
- Height: 1.78 m (5 ft 10 in)
- Position: Midfielder

Youth career
- Marathón

Senior career*
Years	Team	Apps	(Gls)
2003–2005	Marathón		
2005–2006	Žilina	10	(0)
2006–2007	Nitra	4	(0)
2007–2009	Nyíregyháza Spartacus	37	(2)
2009–2013	Debrecen	61	(2)
2012	→ Kecskemét (loan)	10	(0)
2013–2014	Châteauroux	13	(0)
2014	Teplice	10	(0)
2014–2015	AZAL	10	(0)
2015	Nyíregyháza Spartacus	0	(0)
2016–2017	Al-Zawra'a		
2017	Marathón	7	(0)

International career
2005	Honduras U20	2	(0)
2009	Honduras	0	(0)
- * Club domestic league appearances and goals as of 27 February 2017 (UTC)

Luis Arcangel Ramos Colon (born 11 April 1985) is a Honduran footballer, who last played for Marathón in the Liga Nacional de Fútbol Profesional de Honduras.

== Club career ==
Ramos started his career with Marathón in Honduras and with MŠK Žilina and FC Nitra in the Slovak Superliga.

=== Debrecen ===
Ramos won the 2009–10 season of the Hungarian League with Debrecen despite his team lost to Kecskeméti TE in the last round. In 2010, Debrecen beat Zalaegerszegi TE in the Hungarian Cup final in the Puskás Ferenc Stadium by 3–2.

On 1 May 2012, Ramos won the Hungarian Cup with Debrecen by beating MTK Budapest on penalty shoot-out in the 2011–12 season. This was the fifth Hungarian Cup trophy for Debrecen.

On 12 May 2012, Ramos won the Hungarian League title with Debrecen after beating Pécs in the 28th round of the Hungarian League by 4–0 at the Oláh Gábor út Stadium which resulted the sixth Hungarian League title for the Hajdús.

=== Châteauroux ===
In 2013, Ramos signed with Ligue 2 team Châteauroux. On 13 February 2014 he personally terminated his contract with the French team.

=== Teplice ===
Later he joined the ranks of then third placed team Teplice. He went on to make ten appearances while Teplice finished 5th at the end of the season.

=== AZAL ===
In July 2014 Ramos went on trial with Azerbaijan Premier League side AZAL, going onto sign permanently for the club later in the month.

=== Nyíregyháza Spartacus ===
In July 2015, Ramos returned to Nyíregyháza Spartacus.

Ramos is one of rare players from CONCACAF to have played in both the UEFA Champions League and the UEFA Europa League.

== International career ==
Ramos was part of the Honduran U-20 team at the 2005 FIFA World Youth Championship in the Netherlands. He has not made his senior debut for Honduras yet, but was a non-playing squad member at the 2009 CONCACAF Gold Cup.

== Career statistics ==
As of 24 December 2014

Club performance			League		Cup		League Cup		Continental		Other		Total	
Season	Club	League	Apps	Goals	Apps	Goals	Apps	Goals	Apps	Goals	Apps	Goals	Apps	Goals
2009–10	Debreceni	Nemzeti Bajnokság I	16	0	2	0			5	0	-		23	0
2010–11	Debreceni	Nemzeti Bajnokság I	19	1	1	0	4	0	2	0	0	0	26	1
2011–12	Debreceni	Nemzeti Bajnokság I	13	1	6	0	5	0	4	0	-		28	1
2012–13	Debreceni	Nemzeti Bajnokság I	12	0	3	0	1	0	1	0	1	0	18	0
2012–13	Kecskeméti (loan)	Nemzeti Bajnokság I	10	0	0	0	3	0	—		-		13	0
2013–14	Châteauroux	Ligue 2	13	0	0	0	1	0	—		-		14	0
2013–14	Teplice	Gambrinus liga	10	0	0	0	—		—		-		10	0
2014–15	AZAL	Premier League	9	0	0	0	—		—		-		9	0
Total	Hungary		60	2	12	0	13	0	12	0	1	0	98	2
Total	France		13	0	0	0	1	0	—		-		14	0
Total	Czech Republic		10	0	0	0	—		—		-		10	0
Total	Azerbaijan		9	0	0	0	—		—		-		9	0
Career total			92	2	12	0	14	0	12	0	1	0	131	2

== Honours ==
Debreceni VSC

- Hungarian League (2): 2010, 2012
- Hungarian Cup (3): 2010, 2012, 2013

== Personal life ==
Luis Ramos is the older brother of footballer Anthony Lozano, who plays with Spanish football team Cádiz CF. He has also obtained Hungarian citizenship.
