= Péter Szilágyi (footballer) =

Hungarian footballer

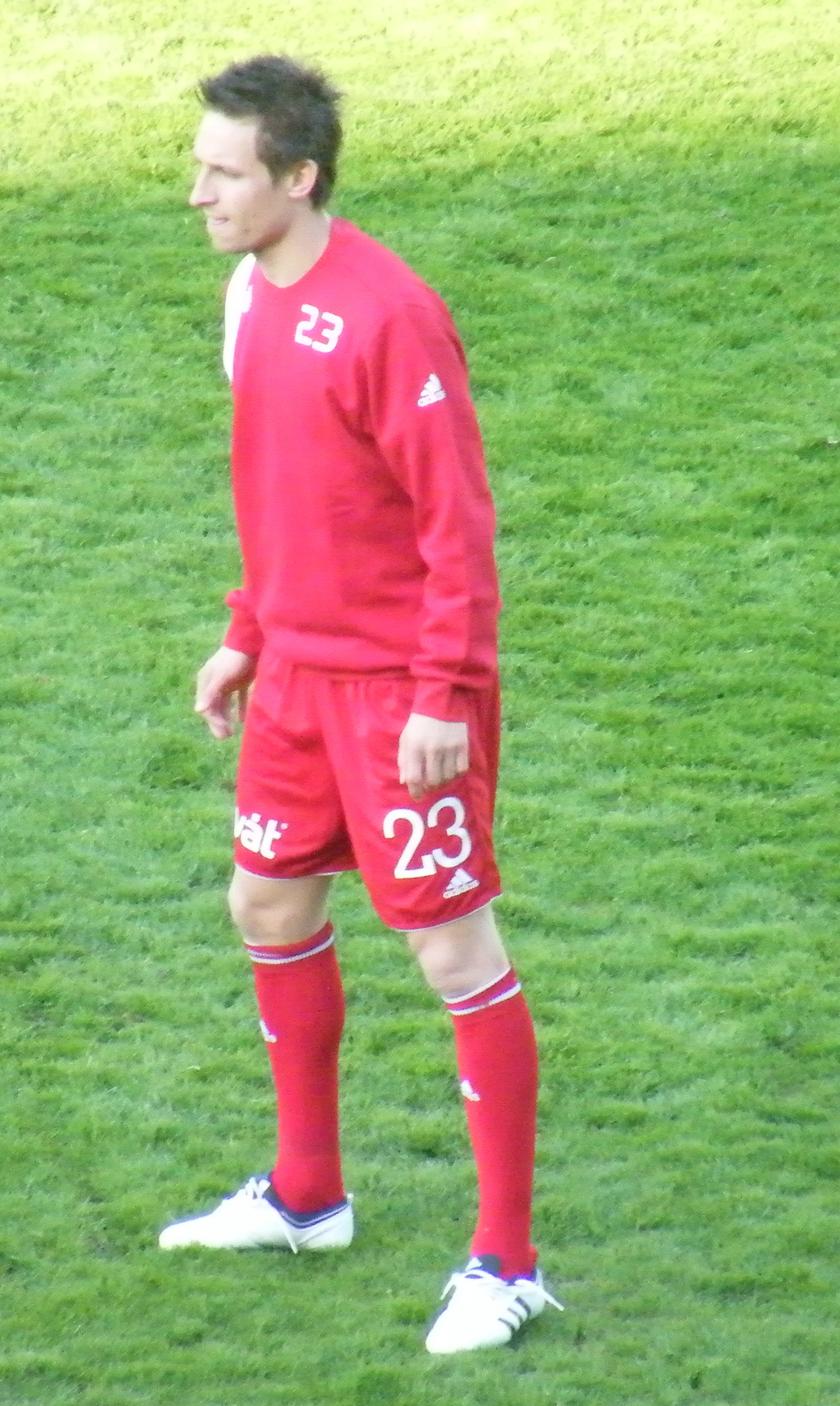

Personal information
- Full name: Péter Szilágyi
- Date of birth: 26 January 1988 (age 38)
- Place of birth: Debrecen, Hungary
- Height: 1.82 m (6 ft 0 in)
- Position: Striker

Team information
- Current team: ESMTK

Senior career*
Years	Team	Apps	(Gls)
2007–2012	Debrecen	24	(4)
2009–2010	→ Vasas (loan)	4	(2)
2011	→ Vasas (loan)	9	(0)
2012	Pápa	10	(0)
2012–2013	Vasas	28	(10)
2013–2014	Nyíregyháza	17	(2)
2014–2016	Békéscsaba	41	(10)
2016–2017	Soroksár	19	(1)
2017–2018	Cegléd	31	(3)
2018–2019	Siófok	16	(0)
2019	Cegléd	30	(3)
2020–	ESMTK	1	(0)

International career
2009	Hungary U-21	2	(0)
- * Club domestic league appearances and goals as of 21:28, 28 September 2020 (UTC)

Péter Szilágyi (Hungarian pronunciation: [ˈpeːtɛr ˈsilaːɟi]; born 26 January 1988 in Debrecen) is a Hungarian football player who currently plays for ESMTK.
