= Nenad Novaković =

Serbian footballer (born 1982)

Personal information
- Date of birth: 14 July 1982 (age 44)
- Place of birth: Titovo Užice, SFR Yugoslavia
- Height: 1.92 m (6 ft 4 in)
- Position: Goalkeeper

Senior career*
Years	Team	Apps	(Gls)
2001–2002	Radnički Kragujevac	31	(0)
2003–2005	Napredak Kruševac	45	(0)
2005–2006	Køge	24	(0)
2006	OB	0	(0)
2007–2008	Reggina	6	(0)
2008	→ Aalesund (loan)	8	(0)
2009–2010	Nordsjælland	27	(0)
2010–2016	Debreceni	71	(0)
Total		212	(0)
- * Club domestic league appearances and goals

Nenad Novaković (Serbian Cyrillic: Ненад Hoвaкoвић; born 14 July 1982) is a Serbian former professional footballer who played as a goalkeeper.

== Career ==
Novaković joined Odense BK in December 2006 and joined Reggina Calcio on 31 January 2007. He made his debut on 16 December, against Parma before he left on loan to Aalesund in summer 2008. On 7 January 2009, he moved to FC Nordsjælland.

On 1 May 2012, Novaković won the Hungarian Cup with Debrecen by beating MTK Budapest on penalty shoot-out in the 2011–12 season. This was the fifth Hungarian Cup trophy for Debrecen.

On 12 May 2012, Novaković won the Hungarian League title with Debrecen after beating Pécs in the 28th round of the Hungarian League by 4–0 at the Oláh Gábor út Stadium which resulted the sixth Hungarian League title for the Hajdús.

== Honours ==
Debrecen

- Hungarian League: 2009–10, 2011–12
- Hungarian Cup: 2009–10, 2011–12
