= Yannick Mbengono =

Cameroonian footballer

Personal information
- Full name: Yannick Mbengono Ondoa
- Date of birth: June 11, 1987 (age 39)
- Place of birth: Bertoua, Cameroon
- Height: 1.70 m (5 ft 7 in)
- Position: Left attacking midfielder

Senior career*
Years	Team	Apps	(Gls)
2003–2005	FS d'Akonolinga		
2005–2006	Budapest Honvéd	4	(0)
2006–2010	Kecskeméti TE	48	(12)
2010–2013	Debreceni VSC	61	(6)
2013–2014	Chainat F.C.	20	(10)
2014–2015	Krabi F.C.	12	(5)
2015–2016	Pápa	30	(14)
- * Club domestic league appearances and goals as of 21 April 2013

Yannick Mbengono Ondoa or simply Yannick Mbengono (born June 11, 1987, Cameroon) is a Cameroon footballer.

== Club career ==
=== Debrecen ===
Mbengono won the 2009–10 season of the Hungarian League with Debrecen despite his team lost to Kecskeméti TE in the last round. In 2010 Debrecen beat Zalaegerszegi TE in the Hungarian Cup final in the Puskás Ferenc Stadium by 3–2.

On 1 May 2012 Yannick won the Hungarian Cup with Debrecen by beating MTK Budapest on penalty shoot-out in the 2011–12 season. This was the fifth Hungarian Cup trophy for Debrecen.

On 12 May 2012 Yannick won the Hungarian League title with Debrecen after beating Pécs in the 28th round of the Hungarian League by 4–0 at the Oláh Gábor út Stadium which resulted the sixth Hungarian League title for the Hajdús.

== Honours ==
Debrecen

- Hungarian League (2): 2009–10, 2011–12
- Hungarian Cup (2): 2009–10, 2011–12
