= Mirsad Mijadinoski =

Macedonian footballer

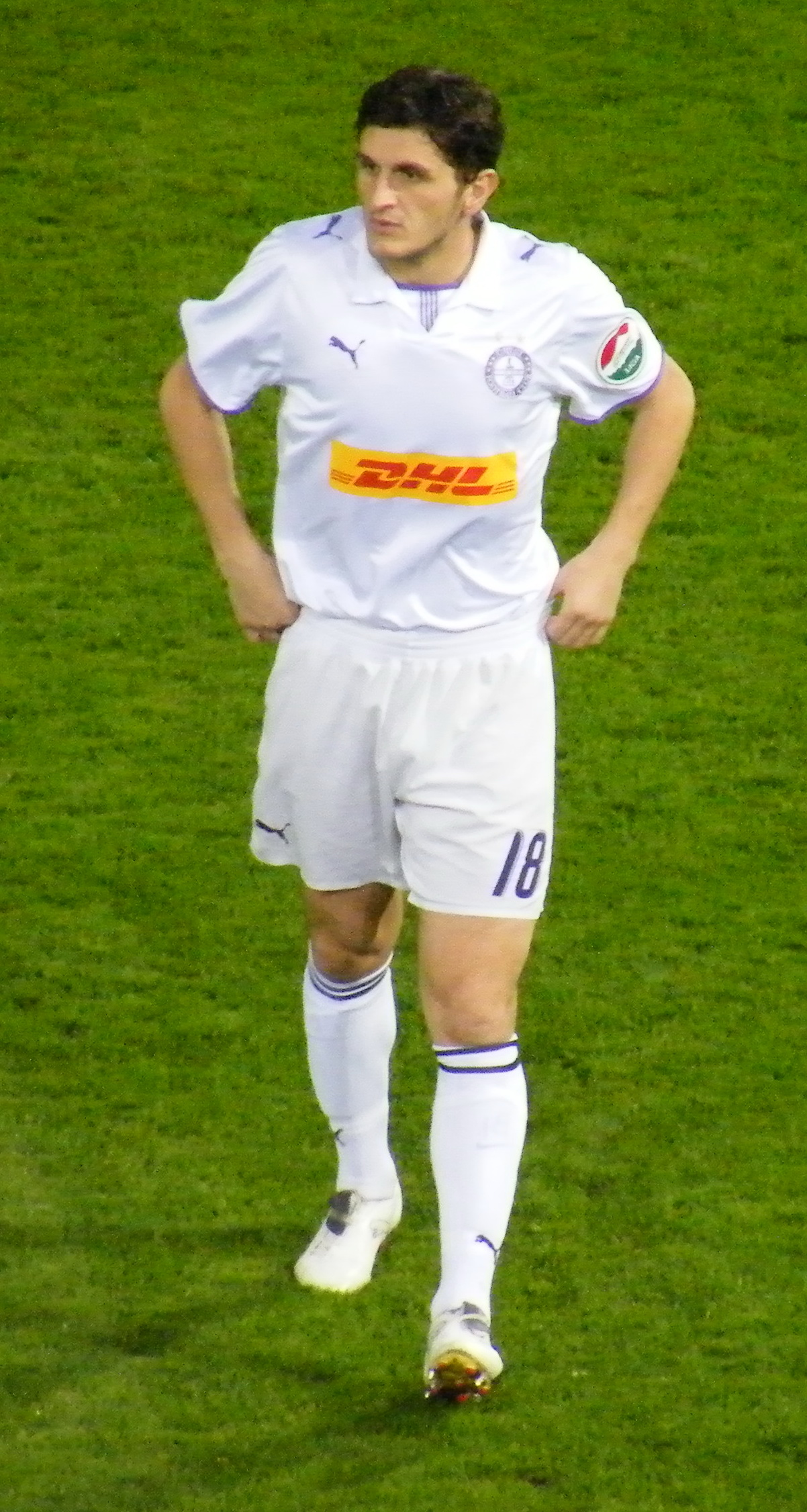

Personal information
- Full name: Mirsad Mijadinoski; Мирсад Мијадиноски
- Date of birth: 1 October 1981 (age 45)
- Place of birth: Struga
- Height: 1.90 m (6 ft 3 in)
- Position: Centre back

Senior career*
Years	Team	Apps	(Gls)
1999–2001	FC Zürich	1	(0)
2001–2002	FC Schaffhausen	11	(0)
2002–2005	FC Baden	91	(12)
2005–2008	Sion	44	(1)
2008–2009	→ Újpest (loan)	26	(3)
2009–2011	Debrecen	37	(4)
2012	FC Wil	15	(1)
Total		224	(21)
- * Club domestic league appearances and goals

Mirsad Mijadinoski (Macedonian: Мирсад Мијадиноски; born 1 October 1981) is a Macedonian former professional footballer who played as a defender.

== Club career ==
He began his career in Switzerland with FC Zürich, FC Schaffhausen and FC Baden. He played for FC Sion in the Swiss Super League and later he was on loan at Hungarian side Újpest FC. He signed a four-year contract with Debreceni VSC on 31 August 2009.
