= Eugène Salami =

Nigerian footballer

Personal information
- Date of birth: February 5, 1989 (age 37)
- Place of birth: Abuja, Nigeria
- Height: 1.80 m (5 ft 11 in)
- Position: Forward

Team information
- Current team: Kiskőrös

Senior career*
Years	Team	Apps	(Gls)
2004–2010	Niger Tornadoes		
2010–2013	Debrecen	9	(1)
2011–2012	→ Debrecen II (loan)	16	(2)
2011	→ Nyíregyháza (loan)	12	(8)
2012–2013	→ Kecskemét (loan)	20	(4)
2013–2015	FK Teplice	36	(6)
2016–2018	Kecskemét		
2018–	Kiskőrös		
- * Club domestic league appearances and goals as of 4 April 2015

Eugène Salami (born 5 February 1989) is a Nigerian footballer, currently playing in Hungary for Kiskőrös.
