= Balázs Farkas (footballer, born 1988) =

Hungarian footballer

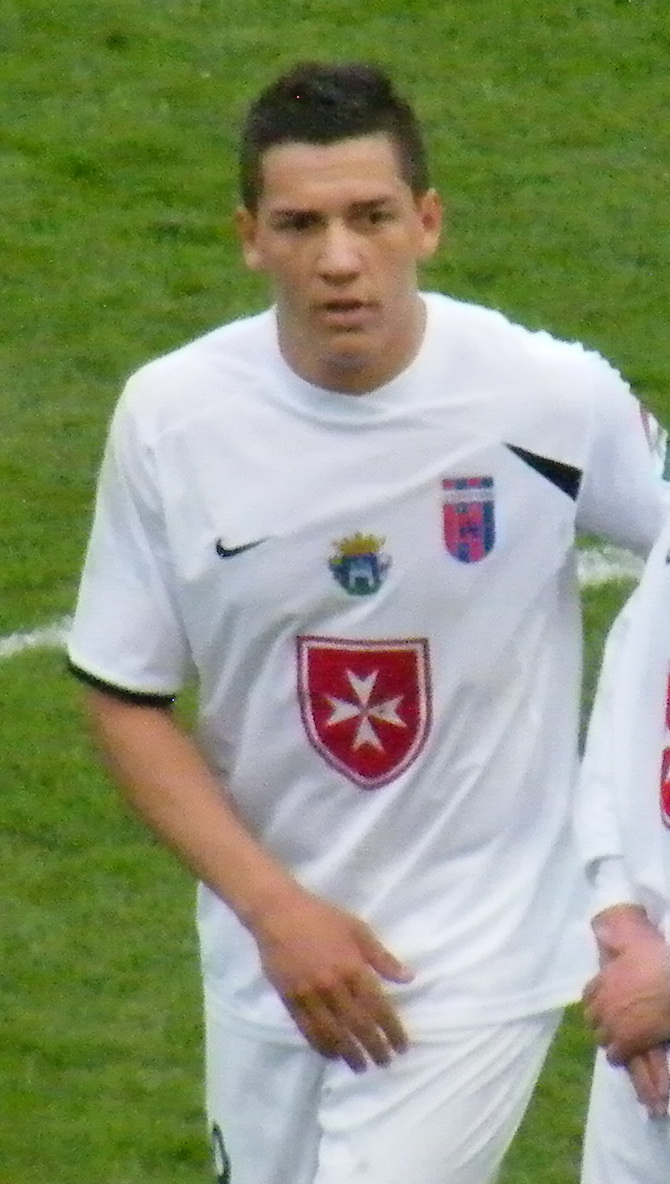
- Farkas playing for Videoton in 2010

Personal information
- Date of birth: 24 April 1988 (age 38)
- Place of birth: Nyíregyháza, Hungary
- Height: 1.76 m (5 ft 9 in)
- Position: Forward

Youth career
- 2000–2004: Nyíregyháza

Senior career*
Years	Team	Apps	(Gls)
2004–2006	Nyíregyháza	15	(1)
2006–2010	Dynamo Kyiv	5	(0)
2007–2008	→ Dynamo-2 Kyiv	3	(0)
2009–2010	→ Videoton (loan)	13	(0)
2010–2012	Debrecen	14	(0)
2010–2012	→ Debrecen II	13	(4)
2013–2014	Győr	1	(0)
2013–2014	→ Győr II	8	(3)
2015–2017	Balmazújváros	39	(3)
2017–2019	MTK Budapest	25	(4)
2019	ZTE	13	(2)
2019–2020	Soroksár	7	(0)
2020–2021	Haladás	9	(1)
2021	Kaposvár	13	(0)

International career
2005–2007	Hungary U19	2	(0)
2006–2009	Hungary U21	6	(0)
2006–2007	Hungary	3	(0)
- * Club domestic league appearances and goals as of 2 May 2021

Balázs Farkas (born 24 April 1988) is a Hungarian former professional footballer, who played as a forward.

== Career ==
Farkas began his career with Nyíregyháza Spartacus and was here promoted to the first team in July 2004. After just one year on seniorside for Nyíregyháza Spartacus who played fifteen games and scores one goal signed in October 2005 with Dynamo Kyiv. Farkas has been loaned out to FC Fehérvár for the 2009/2010 season.

== International career ==
He is also a member of the Hungary national football team and played his first match on 15 November 2006.

== Honours ==
FC Dynamo Kyiv

- Reserves
  - Ukrainian Premier Reserve League: 2007–08
- First Team
  - Ukrainian Championship: 2006–07
    - runner-up: 2007–08
  - Ukrainian Cup: 2006–07
    - runner-up: 2007–08
  - Ukrainian Super Cup: 2007
  - Channel One Cup: 2008

Videoton FC

- Hungarian National Championship I: runner up 2009–10
