= Vinicius (footballer, born 1989) =

Brazilian footballer

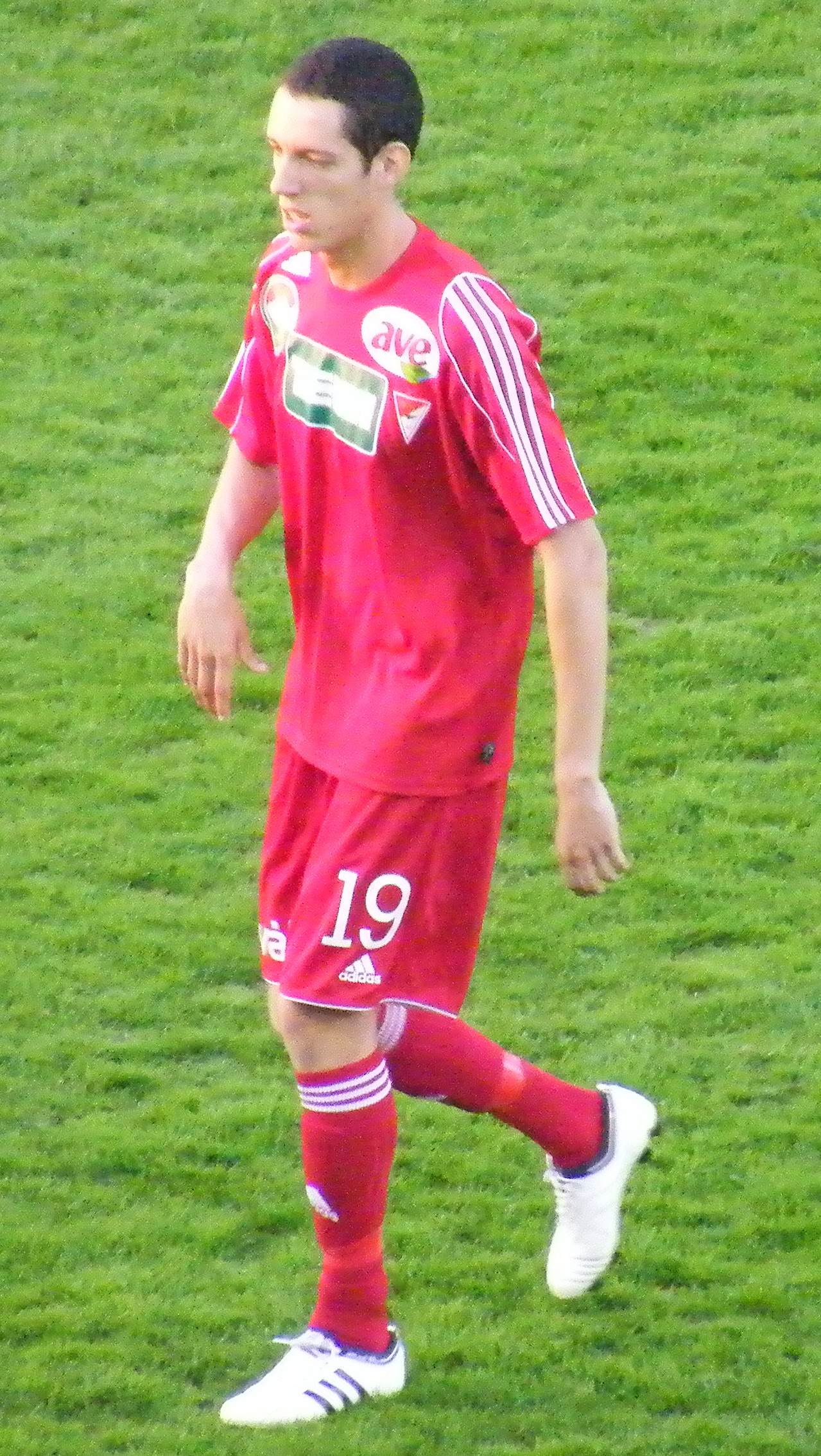

Personal information
- Full name: Vinicius Galvão Leal
- Date of birth: August 12, 1989 (age 37)
- Place of birth: Porto Alegre, Brazil
- Height: 1.80 m (5 ft 11 in)
- Position: Striker

Team information
- Current team: Union Sparkasse Pettenbach
- Number: 10

Senior career*
Years	Team	Apps	(Gls)
2008–2017	Debreceni VSC	14	(1)
2012	→ Nyíregyháza Spartacus (loan)	14	(1)
2017–	Union Sparkasse Pettenbach	14	(7)
- * Club domestic league appearances and goals as of August 4, 2012

Vinicius Galvão Leal (born August 12, 1989, Brazil) is a Brazilian footballer currently under contract for Austrian side Union Sparkasse Pettenbach.

== Club statistics ==
Club	Season	League		Cup		League Cup		Europe		Total	
Club	Season	Apps	Goals	Apps	Goals	Apps	Goals	Apps	Goals	Apps	Goals
Debrecen
Debrecen	2007–08	0	0	0	0	1	0	0	0	1	0
Debrecen	2008–09	7	1	2	3	5	2	0	0	14	6
Debrecen	2009–10	6	0	2	2	6	0	0	0	14	2
Debrecen	2010–11	0	0	3	1	2	0	0	0	5	1
Debrecen	2011–12	0	0	2	3	2	0	0	0	4	3
Debrecen	2012–13	1	0	0	0	0	0	0	0	1	0
Debrecen	Total	14	1	9	9	16	2	0	0	39	12
Career Total		14	1	9	9	16	2	0	0	39	12

Updated to games played as of August 4, 2012.
