= Zoltán Nagy (footballer, born 1985) =

Hungarian footballer

Personal information
- Full name: Zoltán Nagy
- Date of birth: 25 October 1985 (age 41)
- Place of birth: Debrecen, Hungary
- Height: 1.87 m (6 ft 2 in)
- Position: Right back

Team information
- Current team: Nyíregyháza (on loan from Debrecen)
- Number: 28

Youth career
- 2002–2006: Debrecen
- 2004–2006: → Létavértes (loan)

Senior career*
Years	Team	Apps	(Gls)
2006–	Debrecen	78	(3)
2006–2007	→ Baktalórántháza (loan)	14	(0)
2009–2010	→ Honvéd (loan)	20	(1)
2014–2015	→ Nyíregyháza (loan)	8	(0)
- * Club domestic league appearances and goals as of 8 October 2016

Zoltán Nagy (Hungarian pronunciation: [ˈzoltaːn ˈnɒɟ]; born 25 October 1985 in Debrecen) is a Hungarian football (defender) player who currently plays for Debreceni VSC.
