= Gyula Illés =

Hungarian footballer

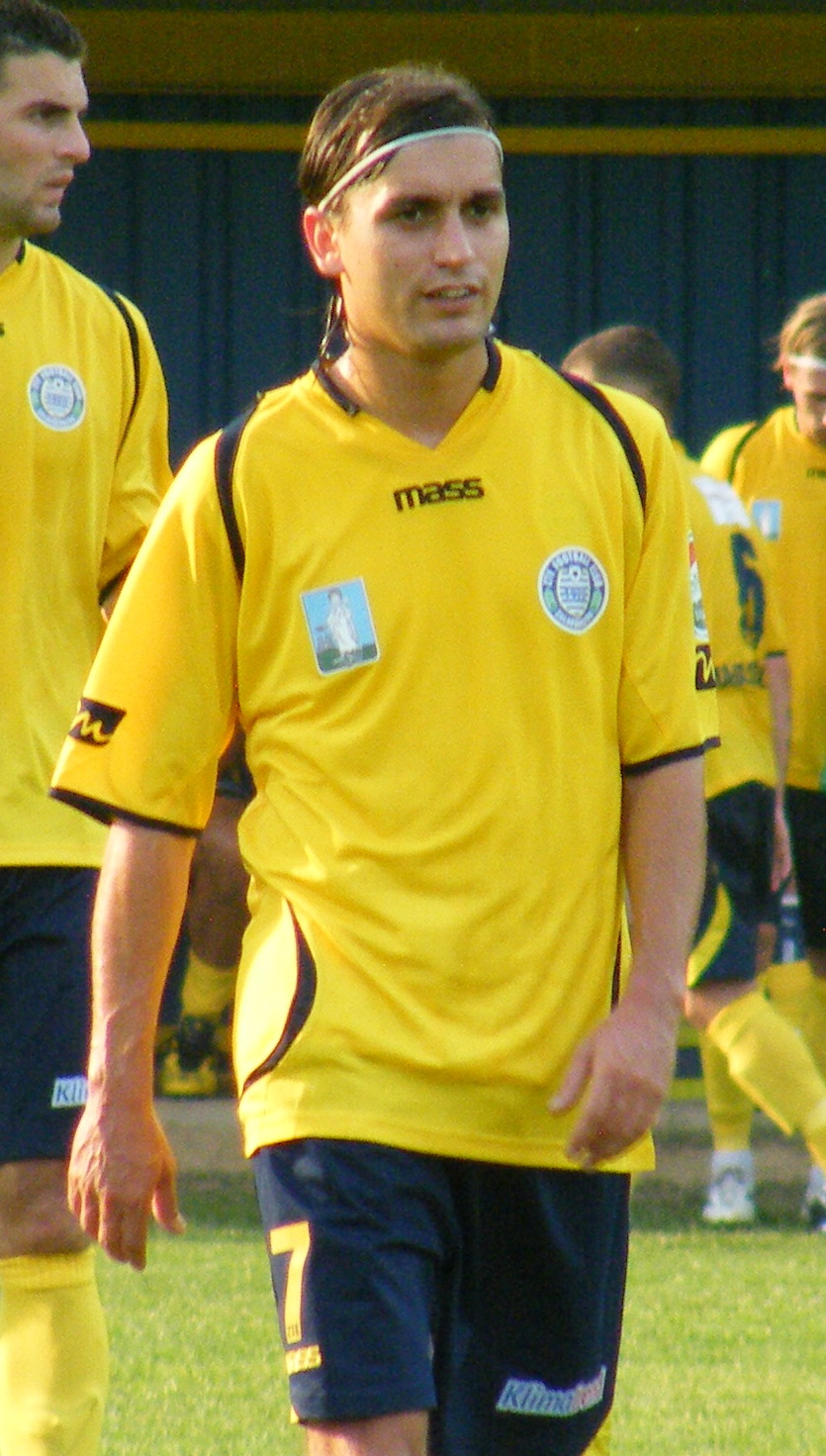

Personal information
- Date of birth: 9 November 1982 (age 44)
- Place of birth: Vásárosnamény, Hungary
- Height: 1.78 m (5 ft 10 in)
- Positions: Midfielder; left winger

Senior career*
Years	Team	Apps	(Gls)
2002–2003	Mátészalka	17	(1)
2003–2006	Nyíregyháza	2	(0)
2005–2006	→ Mátészalka (loan)		
2006	→ Bőcs (loan)	12	(1)
2006–2009	Baktalórántháza	67	(4)
2009–2011	Zalaegerszeg	46	(6)
2011–2012	Debrecen	10	(0)
2012–2015	Gyirmót	33	(5)
2015	Dhaka Abahani	0	(0)
2015	Siófok	15	(1)
2015–2016	Szigetszentmiklós	9	(0)
2016–2017	Nyírbátor	34	(8)
- * Club domestic league appearances and goals

Gyula Illés (born 9 November 1982) is a Hungarian former footballer.
