= István Spitzmüller =

Hungarian footballer

Personal information
- Date of birth: 14 May 1986 (age 40)
- Place of birth: Hajdúnánás, Hungary
- Height: 1.86 m (6 ft 1 in)
- Position: Midfielder

Team information
- Current team: DEAC

Youth career
- 2002–2005: Debrecen
- 2005–2007: Létavértes

Senior career*
Years	Team	Apps	(Gls)
2007–2014	Debrecen	24	(0)
2014–2015	Nyíregyháza	8	(0)
2015–2017	Békéscsaba	54	(1)
2017–2018	STC Salgótarján	16	(2)
2018	Debrecen II	10	(0)
2018–	DEAC	112	(14)
- * Club domestic league appearances and goals as of 29 May 2022

István Spitzmüller (born 14 May 1986) is a Hungarian football midfielder who plays for DEAC.

== Career statistics ==
Appearances and goals by club, season and competition
Club	Season	League		Cup		League Cup		Europe		Total	
Club	Season	Apps	Goals	Apps	Goals	Apps	Goals	Apps	Goals	Apps	Goals
Debrecen
Debrecen	2006–07	0	0	1	0	0	0	0	0	1	0
Debrecen	2007–08	1	0	3	0	13	0	0	0	17	0
Debrecen	2008–09	1	0	2	4	5	0	0	0	8	4
Debrecen	2009–10	1	0	6	2	5	0	0	0	12	2
Debrecen	2010–11	5	0	3	0	4	0	0	0	12	0
Debrecen	2011–12	3	0	1	0	9	1	0	0	13	1
Debrecen	2012–13	13	0	4	0	6	0	1	0	24	0
Debrecen	2013–14	0	0	6	0	12	1	0	0	18	1
Debrecen	Total	24	0	26	6	54	2	1	0	105	8
Nyíregyháza
Nyíregyháza	2014–15	8	0	3	1	6	1	0	0	17	2
Nyíregyháza	Total	8	0	3	1	6	1	0	0	17	2
Career total		32	0	29	7	60	3	1	0	122	10

Updated to games played as of 23 November 2014.

== Sources ==
- Profile on hlsz.hu (in Hungarian)
- Profile on dvsc.hu (in Hungarian)
- István Spitzmüller at Soccerway (archived)
