= Mindaugas Malinauskas =

Lithuanian footballer and coach

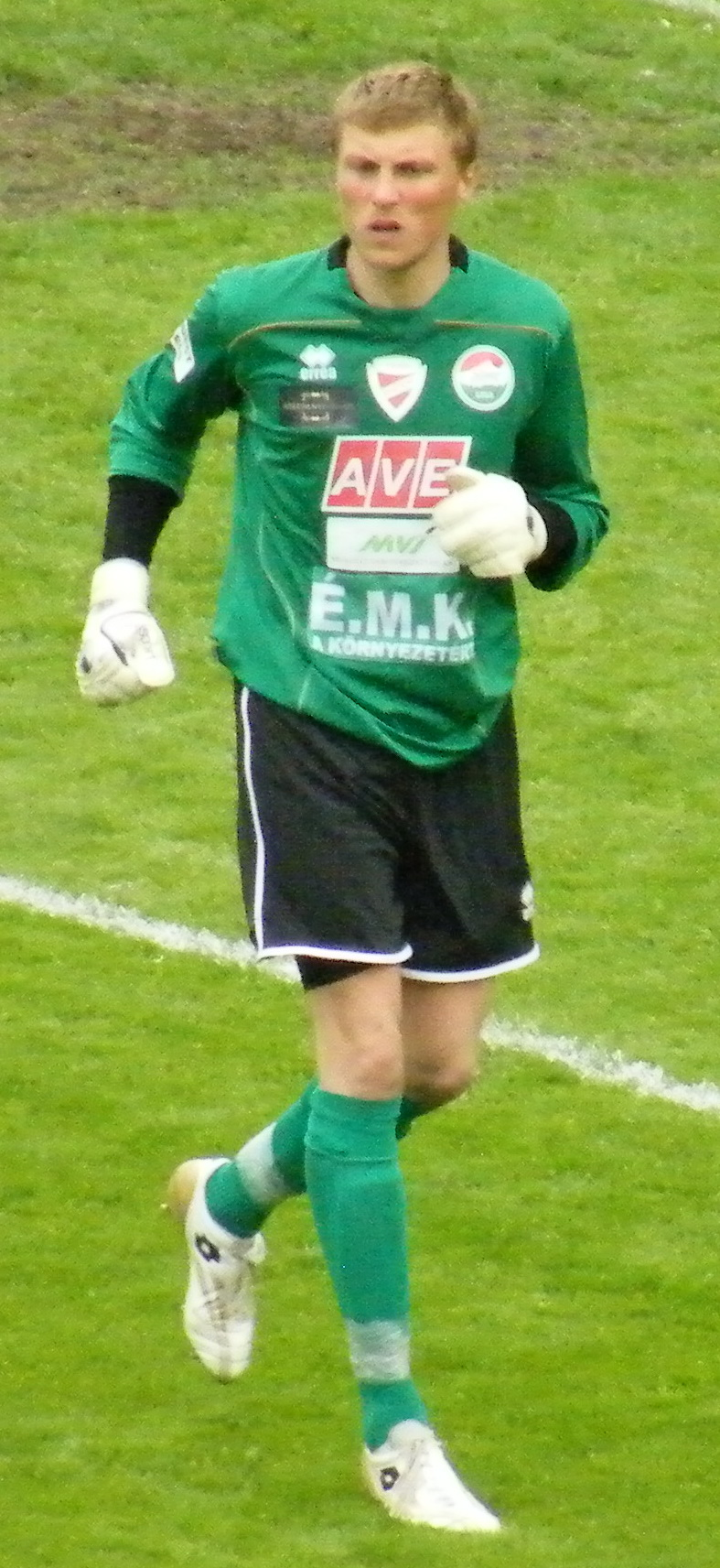

Personal information
- Date of birth: 11 August 1983 (age 43)
- Place of birth: Vilnius, Lithuania
- Height: 1.90 m (6 ft 3 in)
- Position: Goalkeeper

Team information
- Current team: FK Riteriai (goalkeeper coach)

Senior career*
Years	Team	Apps	(Gls)
2004–2005	Žalgiris Vilnius	50	(0)
2006–2007	FBK Kaunas	26	(0)
2008	FK Šilutė	11	(0)
2009–2010	Tranzīts Ventspils	21	(0)
2010	Diósgyőri VTK	10	(0)
2010–2012	Debreceni VSC	14	(0)
2012	FK Šiauliai	14	(0)
2013	FK Kruoja Pakruojis	6	(0)
2014–2015	FK Atlantas	26	(1)
2016	FK Šilas Kazlų Rūda	30	(4)
2017	FK Panerys (2017)	14	(0)
2018–2019	FK Nevėžis Kėdainiai	27	(0)
2019	FM Ateitis	3	(0)
2019	Rings-Avelita	3	(0)

International career
	Lithuania U21	8	(0)
2006	Lithuania	2	(0)
- * Club domestic league appearances and goals

Mindaugas Malinauskas (born 11 August 1983 in Vilnius) is a retired Lithuanian football goalkeeper and current goalkeeper coach of FK Riteriai.

Malinauskas has made two appearances for the Lithuania national football team.

== Career ==
Malinauskas started his career with Zalgiris Vilnius debuting in the 2004 season. After a two-year spell with FBK Kaunas he moved to Latvia, signing for FC Tranzit in 2009. He then played in Hungary for two years and in 2012 he returned to the A Lyga.

=== Later career ===
In 2017, Malinauskas returned to his hometown, Vilnius, and joined FK Panerys (2017). He was also hired as a goalkeeper coach for Futbolo Mokykla „Ateitis“, a football school in Vilnius. He later played for FK Nevėžis Kėdainiai (2018–19), FM Ateitis (2019) and Rings-Avelita (2019) before retiring at the end of 2019.
In January 2020, 36-years old Malinauskas was hired as goalkeeper coach at FK Riteriai.
