= László Rezes =

Hungarian footballer

Personal information
- Full name: László Rezes
- Date of birth: 12 August 1987 (age 39)
- Place of birth: Debrecen, Hungary
- Height: 1.73 m (5 ft 8 in)
- Position: Left midfielder

Team information
- Current team: DEAC
- Number: 10

Youth career
- 1994–2002: Olasz Focisuli
- 2002–2006: Debrecen
- 2004–2006: → Létavértes (loan)

Senior career*
Years	Team	Apps	(Gls)
2006–2014	Debrecen	55	(4)
2007	→ Kecskemét (loan)	12	(0)
2011	→ Vasas (loan)	12	(1)
2014–2019	Nyíregyháza	147	(41)
2020–	DEAC	8	(0)

International career
2003–2004	Hungary U–17	5	(2)
2005–2006	Hungary U–19	3	(1)
- * Club domestic league appearances and goals as of 14:49, 31 January 2021 (UTC)

László Rezes (Hungarian pronunciation: [ˈlaːsloː ˈrɛzɛʃ]; born 12 August 1987 in Debrecen) is a Hungarian football (midfielder) player who currently plays for DEAC.

== Club career ==
=== Debrecen ===
Rezes won the 2009–10 season of the Hungarian League with Debrecen despite his team lost to Kecskeméti TE in the last round. In 2010 Debrecen beat Zalaegerszegi TE in the Hungarian Cup final in the Puskás Ferenc Stadium by 3–2.

On 1 May 2012 Rezes won the Hungarian Cup with Debrecen by beating MTK Budapest on penalty shoot-out in the 2011–12 season. This was the fifth Hungarian Cup trophy for Debrecen.

On 12 May 2012 Rezes won the Hungarian League title with Debrecen after beating Pécs in the 28th round of the Hungarian League by 4–0 at the Oláh Gábor út Stadium which resulted the sixth Hungarian League title for the Hajdús.

== Career statistics ==
Appearances and goals by club, season and competition
Club	Season	League		Cup		League Cup		Europe		Total	
Club	Season	Apps	Goals	Apps	Goals	Apps	Goals	Apps	Goals	Apps	Goals
Debrecen
Debrecen	2006–07	5	0	3	0	0	0	0	0	8	0
Debrecen	2007–08	1	0	2	0	13	1	0	0	16	1
Debrecen	2008–09	5	0	2	1	1	0	0	0	8	1
Debrecen	2009–10	10	1	4	2	5	1	0	0	19	4
Debrecen	2010–11	4	0	0	0	0	0	5	1	9	1
Debrecen	2011–12	17	2	6	0	4	1	0	0	27	3
Debrecen	2012–13	13	1	2	0	5	1	6	0	26	2
Debrecen	2013–14	2	0	2	0	2	0	0	0	6	0
Debrecen	Total	57	4	21	3	30	4	11	1	119	12
Kecskemét
Kecskemét	2006–07	12	0	0	0	0	0	0	0	12	0
Kecskemét	Total	12	0	0	0	0	0	0	0	12	0
Vasas
Vasas	2010–11	12	1	0	0	0	0	0	0	12	1
Vasas	Total	12	1	0	0	0	0	0	0	12	1
Nyíregyháza
Nyíregyháza	2013–14	12	5	0	0	0	0	0	0	12	5
Nyíregyháza	2014–15	4	0	0	0	0	0	0	0	4	0
Nyíregyháza	Total	16	5	0	0	0	0	0	0	16	5
Career total		97	11	21	3	30	4	11	1	159	19

Updated to games played as of 17 August 2014.

== Honours ==
- Debreceni VSC
  - Hungarian National Championship I: 2009–10
  - Hungarian League Cup: 2010
