= 2009–10 Debreceni VSC season =

Debreceni VSC – TEVA
2009–10 season
- Chairman: Sándor Szilágyi
- Manager: András Herczeg
- Soproni Liga: 1st
- Magyar Kupa: Winners
- Ligakupa: Winners
- Szuperkupa: Winners
- UEFA Champions League: Group stage

The 2009–10 season was Debreceni VSC – TEVA's 17th competitive season, 17th consecutive season in the Soproni Liga and 107th year in existence as a football club.

== Team kit ==
The team kits for the 2009–10 season are produced by Adidas and the shirt sponsor is TEVA. The home kit is red colour and the away kit is white colour.

Home	Away

== Squad ==
=== First-team squad ===
Updated 9 August 2009.

Note: Flags indicate national team as defined under FIFA eligibility rules; some limited exceptions apply. Players may hold more than one non-FIFA nationality.

No.	Pos.	Nation	Player
1	GK	MNE	Vukašin Poleksić
2	DF	HUN	István Szűcs
4	MF	HUN	Leandro de Almeida
5	DF	HUN	Dávid Mohl
6	MF	HON	Luis Ramos
7	MF	HUN	Tibor Dombi (vice-captain)
10	DF	HUN	László Bodnár
11	FW	HUN	Róbert Feczesin
12	GK	SRB	Đorđe Pantić
13	DF	HUN	Péter Bíró
14	FW	HUN	Gergely Rudolf
15	MF	HUN	László Rezes
16	DF	HUN	Ádám Komlósi
17	DF	HUN	Norbert Mészáros
18	DF	HUN	Péter Máté
19	FW	BRA	Vinicius Galvão Leal
21	DF	HUN	Marcell Fodor
22	DF	HUN	Csaba Bernáth (vice-captain)

No.	Pos.	Nation	Player
23	FW	HUN	Péter Szilágyi
24	DF	MKD	Mirsad Mijadinoski
25	DF	HUN	Zoltán Szélesi
28	DF	HUN	Zoltán Nagy
30	MF	HUN	Zoltán Kiss (captain)
33	MF	HUN	József Varga
39	FW	FRA	Adamo Coulibaly
41	FW	HUN	Lóránt Oláh
55	MF	HUN	Péter Szakály
60	MF	SVK	Károly Czanik
69	DF	HUN	Mihály Korhut
77	MF	HUN	Péter Czvitkovics
81	MF	HUN	Attila Katona
86	MF	HUN	Zsolt Laczkó
87	GK	HUN	István Verpecz
88	MF	HUN	Tamás Huszák
99	FW	NGR	Omagbemi Dudu

=== Reserve squad ===
Note: Flags indicate national team as defined under FIFA eligibility rules; some limited exceptions apply. Players may hold more than one non-FIFA nationality.

No.	Pos.	Nation	Player
4	MF	BRA	Marcolini Lucas
5	FW	HUN	Norbert Angyal
6	DF	HUN	Ádám Németh
11	FW	HUN	Milán Faggyas
13	MF	HUN	Bence Ludánszki
14	FW	HUN	Lajos Tóth
17	DF	HUN	Mihály Korhut
20	MF	HUN	Róbert Nagy
	DF	HUN	Szilárd Éles

No.	Pos.	Nation	Player
22	MF	HUN	Tamás Nagy
26	MF	HUN	Norbert Kardos
27	MF	HUN	Ádám Bódi
29	MF	HUN	István Spitzmüller
30	GK	MNE	Mihailo Radulović
	MF	HUN	Gábor Szilágyi
77	DF	HUN	Gergő Oláh
90	GK	HUN	Dániel Póser

== Transfers ==
=== Summer ===
In: Note: Flags indicate national team as defined under FIFA eligibility rules; some limited exceptions apply. Players may hold more than one non-FIFA nationality.

No.	Pos.	Nation	Player
	GK	HUN	Zsolt Hamar (loan return from (Hungary) Bőcs KSC)
	FW	MKD	Aco Stojkov (loan return from (Hungary) Nyíregyháza Spartacus)
5	DF	HUN	Dávid Mohl (from (Hungary) FC Fehérvár)
6	MF	HON	Luis Ramos (from (Hungary) Nyíregyháza Spartacus)
10	DF	HUN	László Bodnár (from (Austria) Red Bull Salzburg)
11	FW	HUN	Róbert Feczesin (on loan from (Italy) Brescia Calcio)
24	DF	MKD	Mirsad Mijadinoski (from (Switzerland) FC Sion)
25	DF	HUN	Zoltán Szélesi (from (France) RC Strasbourg)
27	MF	HUN	Tamás Szélpál (loan return from (Hungary) Diósgyőri VTK)
39	FW	FRA	Adamo Coulibaly (from (Belgium) Royal Antwerp F.C.)
86	MF	HUN	Zsolt Laczkó (from (Hungary) Vasas SC)

Out: Note: Flags indicate national team as defined under FIFA eligibility rules; some limited exceptions apply. Players may hold more than one non-FIFA nationality.

No.	Pos.	Nation	Player
	MF	HUN	Gábor Demjén (to (Hungary) FC Fehérvár)
	DF	HUN	Szilárd Éles (on loan to (Hungary) Nyíregyháza Spartacus)
	GK	HUN	Zsolt Hamar (on loan to (Hungary) Hajdúböszörményi TE)
	FW	MKD	Aco Stojkov (to (Switzerland) FC Aarau)
3	DF	SRB	Božidar Ćosić (to (Bosnia and Herzegovina) FK Modriča)
10	FW	SRB	Igor Bogdanović (to (Hungary) Nyíregyháza Spartacus)
11	FW	HUN	Milán Faggyas (on loan to (Hungary) Diósgyőri VTK)
20	MF	HUN	Róbert Nagy (on loan to (Hungary) Diósgyőri VTK)
23	FW	HUN	Péter Szilágyi (on loan to (Hungary) Vasas SC)
27	MF	HUN	Tamás Szélpál (on loan to (Hungary) Nyíregyháza Spartacus)
28	DF	HUN	Zoltán Nagy (on loan to (Hungary) Budapest Honvéd FC)
60	MF	SVK	Károly Czanik (on loan to (Hungary) Nyíregyháza Spartacus)
88	MF	HUN	Tamás Huszák (on loan to (Hungary) Diósgyőri VTK)

=== Loaned out ===
#	Pos	Player	To	Start	End
#	GK	(Hungary) Zsolt Hamar	Hajdúböszörményi TE	13-07-2009	13-07-2010
29	MF	(Hungary) Zoltán Varga	Rákospalotai EAC	22-07-2009	22-01-2010
#	MF	(Hungary) Milán Faggyas	Diósgyőri VTK	29-07-2009	29-01-2010
#	MF	(Hungary) Róbert Nagy	Diósgyőri VTK	29-07-2009	29-01-2010
60	MF	(Slovakia) Károly Czanik	Nyíregyháza Spartacus	15-08-2009	15-08-2010

=== Overall ===
This section displays the club's financial expenditure's in the transfer market. Because all transfer fee's are not disclosed to the public, the numbers displayed in this section are only based on figures released by media outlets.

==== Spending ====
Summer: ▼£623,000

Winter: ▲£0

Total: ▼£623,000

==== Income ====
Summer: ▲£667,500

Winter: ▲£0

Total: ▲£667,500

==== Expenditure ====
Summer: ▲£44,500

Winter: ▲£0

Total: ▲£44,500

== Club ==
=== Coaching staff ===
Position	Staff
Manager	(Hungary) András Herczeg
Assistant managers	(Serbia) Zoran Spisljak
Assistant managers	(Hungary) Zsolt Bücs
First team fitness coach	(Hungary) Mihály Dankó
Goalkeeping coach	(Hungary) József Mező
Head scout	(Hungary) Norbert Csarnai
Club doctor	(Hungary) Dr. Zoltán Dézsi
Club doctor	(Hungary) Dr. Lehel Varga
Masseur	(Hungary) István Nagy
Reserve team manager	(Hungary) Elemér Kondás
Youth team manager	(Hungary) László Sáfár
Academy manager	(Hungary) István Antal

Last updated: 10 Aug 2009
Source: Debreceni VSC

=== Other information ===
General Manager	(Hungary) Sándor Szilágyi
Sport Director	(Hungary) Dr. Csaba Bartha
Technical Leader	(Hungary) Béla Horváth
Security Chief	(Hungary) János Képíró
Chief Organiser	(Hungary) János Képíró Jr
Ground (capacity and dimensions)	Stadion Oláh Gábor Út (10,200 / 105x68 meters)

Updated to match played 10 Aug 2009
Source: Debreceni VSC

== Competitions ==
=== Super Cup ===
18 July 2009	Budapest Honvéd FC	0–1	Debreceni VSC	Siófok
19:00 CEST	Diego (yellow card) 20'; Benjamin (red card) 75'	Report	Mohl (yellow card) 15'; Z. Nagy (yellow card) 21'; Komlósi (yellow card) 72'; P. Szilágyi 83'; Spitzmüller (yellow card) 90+2'	Stadium: Révesz Géza Stadion; Attendance: 10,500; Referee: Sándor Andó-Szabó

=== Nemzeti Bajnokság I ===
==== League table ====
Pos	Team	Pld	W	D	L	GF	GA	GD	Pts	Qualification or relegation
1	Debrecen (C)	30	20	2	8	63	37	+26	62	Qualification for Champions League second qualifying round
2	Videoton	30	18	7	5	59	31	+28	61	Qualification for Europa League second qualifying round
3	Győr	30	15	12	3	38	18	+20	57	Qualification for Europa League first qualifying round
4	Újpest	30	17	4	9	49	39	+10	55	
5	Zalaegerszeg	30	15	8	7	59	45	+14	53	Qualification for Europa League first qualifying round (Note: Since the winners of the 2009–10 Magyar Kupa, Debrecen, qualified for the Champions League, the spot given to the Magyar Kupa winners (Europa League first qualifying round) was passed to the losing finalists.)

Source: soccerway.com
Rules for classification: 1st points; 2nd overall wins; 3rd goal difference; 4th goals scored
(C) Champions

==== Results summary ====
Overall								Home						Away					
Pld	W	D	L	GF	GA	GD	Pts	W	D	L	GF	GA	GD	W	D	L	GF	GA	GD
25	18	1	6	56	32	+24	55	11	0	1	31	12	+19	7	1	5	25	20	+5

Last updated: 1 May 2010.
Source: Soproni Liga

==== Results by round ====
Round	1	2	3	4	5	6	7	8	9	10	11	12	13	14	15	16	17	18	19	20	21	22	23	24	25	26	27	28	29	30
Ground	A	H	A	H	H	H	A	H	A	H	A	A	H	A	H	H	A	H	A	A	A	H	A	H	A	H	H	A	H	A
Result	L	W	W	W	W	W	W	W	D	W	W	L	L	L	W	W	W	W	W	L	W	W	L	W	W	W	W	L	D	L
Position	12	9	6	3	3	1	1	1	1	1	1	1	2	2	2	2	2	2	1	2	2	2	2	2	2	1	1	1	1	1

Updated to match(es) played on 1 May 2010. Source: Matches
A = Away; H = Home; W = Win; D = Draw; L = Loss

==== Matches ====
25 July 2009 1	Diósgyőri VTK	1–0	Debreceni VSC	Miskolc
20:00 CEST	G. Horváth (yellow card) 78'; Lippai (yellow card) 81' (goal) 90+3' (pen.); Gohér (yellow card) 90+4'	Report	Mohl (yellow card) 70'; P. Szilágyi (red card) 90+2'	Stadium: DVTK Stadion; Attendance: 3,000; Referee: Tamás Bognár

1 August 2009 2	Debreceni VSC	2–0	Lombard-Pápa TFC	Debrecen
17:30 CEST	L. Oláh 48'; Coulibaly 58'; Korhut (yellow card) 82'; M. Fodor (yellow card) 85'	Report	Dlusztus (yellow card) 30'; Gyömbér (yellow card) 89'	Stadium: Stadion Oláh Gábor Út; Attendance: 3,000; Referee: Ádám Németh

20 November 2009 3	Budapest Honvéd FC	1–2	Debreceni VSC	Budapest
19:00 CEST	Vukmir (yellow card) 60'; Abraham 68'; Benjamin (yellow card) 77'; Palásthy (yellow card) 83'	Report	Dudu (yellow card) 42'; Leandro (yellow card) 67' (goal) 76'; Bernáth (yellow card) 70'; Czvitkovics (yellow card) 84'; Rudolf 90+1'	Stadium: Bozsik Stadion; Attendance: 1,000; Referee: István II Vad

14 August 2009 4	Debreceni VSC	2–1	Szombathelyi Haladás	Debrecen
19:00 CEST	Leandro 2' (yellow card) 89'; Czvitkovics 63'	Report	Ugrai 75'; G. Nagy (yellow card) 21'; Skriba (yellow card) 59'; P. Tóth (yellow card) 90'	Stadium: Stadion Oláh Gábor Út; Attendance: 4,000; Referee: István Vad

29 November 2009 5	Debreceni VSC	5–3	Zalaegerszegi TE	Debrecen
17:30 CEST	J. Varga 4'; L. Oláh 9'; P. Szakály 17'; Fodor (yellow card) 22'; Komlósi 25'; Ramos (yellow card) 28'; Coulibaly 42'	Report	Zs. Balázs 19'; Rudņevs 22'; Todorović 30' (pen.) (yellow card) 45'; Magasföldi (yellow card) 82'	Stadium: Stadion Oláh Gábor Út; Attendance: 3,500; Referee: Zoltán Iványi

29 August 2009 6	Debreceni VSC	3–1	Nyíregyháza Spartacus	Debrecen
15:00 CEST	Rudolf 7', 49'; Coulibaly 22'; Bernáth (yellow card) 66'	Report	Homma 56'; Mboussi (yellow card) 65'	Stadium: Stadion Oláh Gábor Út; Attendance: 5,500; Referee: Péter Solymosi

11 September 2009 7	Paksi SE	0–1	Debreceni VSC	Paks
19:00 CEST	J. Szabó (yellow card) 69'; Éger (yellow card) 85'	Report	P. Szakály 33'; L. Oláh (yellow card) 71'	Stadium: Stadion PSE; Attendance: 3,000; Referee: Tamás Arany

20 September 2009 8	Debreceni VSC	2–1	Ferencvárosi TC	Debrecen
17:30 CEST	P. Szakály 51'; Komlósi (yellow card) 60'; Coulibaly 72'	Report	Ferenczi 20' (yellow card) 44'; Ashmore (yellow card) 60'; Morrison (yellow card) 66'; Pisanjuk (yellow card) 86'; Megyeri (red card) 90+1'	Stadium: Stadion Oláh Gábor Út; Attendance: 8,500; Referee: Péter Solymosi

25 September 2009 9	Kaposvári Rákóczi FC	4–4	Debreceni VSC	Kaposvár
17:00 CEST	Bank 17'; Zahorecz (yellow card) 49' (goal) 64' (pen.); Petrók (yellow card) 53'; Nikolić 61'; Pest (yellow card) 62'; Reszli 86'	Report	Czvitkovics 47', 54' (pen.); I. Szűcs (yellow card) 63'; P. Szakály 70'; Rezes 81'; Poleksić (penalty missed)	Stadium: Stadion Kaposvár Rákoczi; Attendance: 2,500; Referee: Sándor Andó-Szabó

3 December 2009 10	Debreceni VSC	2–0	MTK Budapest FC	Debrecen
18:00 CEST	Coulibaly 34' (pen.); P. Szakály 36'; Szélesi (yellow card) 56'	Report	Zsidai (yellow card) 18'; Hidvégi (yellow card) 33'; Pátkai (yellow card) 85'; Lencse (red card) 85'	Stadium: Stadion Oláh Gábor Út; Attendance: 3,000; Referee: Ádám Németh

16 October 2009 11	Vasas SC	2–4	Debreceni VSC	Budapest
17:00 CEST	Dobrić 10', 69'; B. Tóth (yellow card) 24'; G. Kovács (yellow card) 80'; Mrdjanin (red card) 85'	Report	Komlósi (red card) 14'; Z. Kiss (yellow card) 23' (goal) 53'; Coulibaly 26', 90+1'; Leandro (yellow card) 61' (goal) 86'	Stadium: Stadion Rudolf Illovszky; Attendance: 850; Referee: Ádám Németh

25 October 2009 12	Videoton FC Fehérvár	3–0	Debreceni VSC	Székesfehérvár
17:30 CEST	Lipták 47'; Polonkai 76'; Andić 84'	Report	Czvitkovics (yellow card) 75' (yellow-red card) 78'	Stadium: Stadion Sóstói; Attendance: 5,000; Referee: Péter Solymosi

30 October 2009 13	Debreceni VSC	1–2	Újpest FC	Debrecen
19:00 CEST	Rudolf 17' (pen.) (penalty missed) (yellow card) 58'; Pantić (yellow card) 38'; Komlósi (yellow card) 90'	Report	Z. Takács (yellow card) 16'; Pollák (yellow card) 26'; Rajczi (yellow card) 27'; Kabát 40' (pen.), 90+1' (pen.); Korcsmár (yellow card) 62'; Vermes (yellow card) 69'	Stadium: Stadion Oláh Gábor Út; Attendance: 6,500; Referee: Sándor Andó-Szabó

8 November 2009 14	Győri ETO FC	1–0	Debreceni VSC	Győr
17:30 CEST	Pilibaitis 1'; Babić (red card) 46'; Stanišić (yellow card) 66'; Aleksidze (yellow card) 75'; Z. Fehér (yellow card) 85'; Stevanović (yellow card) 89'	Report	Bodnár (yellow card) 12'; Coulibaly (yellow card) 78'; Rudolf (yellow card) 85'	Stadium: Stadion ETO; Attendance: 2,000; Referee: Mihály Fábián

17 November 2009 15	Debreceni VSC	1–0	Kecskeméti TE	Debrecen
18:00 CEST	Ramos (yellow card) 23'; Czvitkovics 27'	Report		Stadium: Stadion Oláh Gábor Út; Attendance: 3,000; Referee: János Takács

26 February 2010 16	Debreceni VSC	3–1	Diósgyőri VTK	Debrecen
19:00 CEST	Ramos (yellow card) 74'; Laczkó 80'; Rudolf 82'; Mijadinoski 90'	Report	Dobos (yellow card) 23'; Bognár 43' (yellow card) 52'; Vukadinović (yellow card) 46'; George (yellow card) 73'; Haman (yellow card) 89'	Stadium: Stadion Oláh Gábor Út; Attendance: 4,000; Referee: Zsolt Szabó

7 March 2010 17	Lombard-Pápa TFC	1–5	Debreceni VSC	Pápa
17:30 CEST	A. Farkas 11' (pen.)	Report	Mijadinoski (yellow card) 11' (goal) 40'; Rudolf 18'; G. Tóth 22' (o.g.); P. Szakály 45'; Ramos (yellow card) 54'; Laczkó (yellow card) 80'; Czvitkovics 90+2'	Stadium: Stadion Várkerti; Attendance: 4,000; Referee: Zoltán Iványi

13 March 2010 18	Debreceni VSC	2–1	Budapest Honvéd FC	Debrecen
17:30 CEST	Feczesin 2'; Laczkó (yellow card) 68'; Coulibaly 72' (yellow card) 72'	Report	Abraham 24'; Cuerda (yellow card) 79'	Stadium: Stadion Oláh Gábor Út; Attendance: 4,500; Referee: Sándor Andó-Szabó

19 March 2010 19	Szombathelyi Haladás	0–2	Debreceni VSC	Szombathely
19:00 CEST	Halmosi (yellow card) 37'	Report	Rudolf (yellow card) 47'; Czvitkovics 68'; Feczesin 75'	Stadium: Rohonci úti Stadion; Attendance: 5,500; Referee: Gergely Sulyok

27 March 2010 20	Zalaegerszegi TE	4–1	Debreceni VSC	Zalaegerszeg
17:30 CEST	Sluka 12'; Pavićević 33'; Panikvar (yellow card) 49'; Illés 57'; Szalai 81'	Report	Ramos (yellow card) 6'; Mészáros (yellow card) 25'; Mijadinoski (yellow card) 64'; Coulibaly 68'	Stadium: ZTE Arena; Attendance: 4,062; Referee: Péter Solymosi

20 April 2010 21	Nyíregyháza Spartacus	0–3	Debreceni VSC	Nyíregyháza
19:00 CEST		Report	Mijadinoski 41'; Feczesin 55'; Coulibaly 57'; Ramos (yellow card) 73'	Stadium: Városi Stadion; Attendance: 3,500; Referee: Zoltán Iványi

10 April 2010 22	Debreceni VSC	3–1	Paksi SE	Debrecen
15:00 CEST	Kiss (yellow card) 25'; Coulibaly 49', 80'; Czvitkovics (yellow card) 55'; Feczesin 64' (pen.)	Report	Vári (yellow card) 14'; Böde 36' (yellow card) 70'; Fiola (yellow card) 42'; Éger (yellow card) 63'	Stadium: Stadion Oláh Gábor Út; Attendance: 2,200; Referee: Ádám Farkas

16 April 2010 23	Ferencvárosi TC	1–0	Debreceni VSC	Budapest
19:00 CEST	Elding (yellow card) 11'; Csizmadia (yellow card) 20'; Dragóner (yellow card) 32'; Tóth 69' (yellow card) 71'	Report	Szélesi (yellow card) 12'; Laczkó (yellow card) 57'; Feczesin (yellow card) 74'	Stadium: Stadion Albert Flórián; Attendance: 4,750; Referee: Mihály Fábián

23 April 2010 24	Debreceni VSC	5–1	Kaposvári Rákóczi FC	Debrecen
19:00 CEST	Komlósi (yellow card) 40'; Czvitkovics 53'; Feczesin 57'; Rudolf 60'; Mészáros 64'; Coulibaly 66' (pen.)	Report	Godslove (yellow card) 31'; Maróti 50'; Grúz (yellow card) 52'; Petrók (yellow card) 66'; Kulcsár (yellow card) 83'	Stadium: Stadion Oláh Gábor Út; Attendance: 2,500; Referee: Gergely Sulyok

1 May 2010 25	MTK Budapest FC	2–3	Debreceni VSC	Budapest
15:00 CEST	Lázok 21'; Szatmári 40'	Report	Szélesi (yellow card) 56'; Feczesin 64', 71'; Czvitkovics 76'	Stadium: Stadion Hidegkuti Nándor; Attendance: 800; Referee: Sándor Andó-Szabó

4 May 2010 26	Debreceni VSC	3–0	Vasas SC	Debrecen
19:00 CEST	Yannick 5', 17'; Czvitkovics 90+2'; Luis Ramos (red card) 24'; Kiss (yellow card) 52'; Fodor (yellow card) 65'	Report	Remili (yellow card) 60'; G. Kovács (yellow card) 70'	Stadium: Stadion Oláh Gábor Út; Attendance: 4,000; Referee: Szabolcs Szilasi

7 May 2010 27	Debreceni VSC	3–2	Videoton	Debrecen
19:00 CEST	Szakály 28'; Czvitkovics 42'; Coulibaly 42' (yellow card) 69'; Yannick (yellow card) 43'	Report	Elek Á. 7' (yellow card) 56'; Lipták 55'; D. Nagy (yellow card) 25'; Anđić (yellow card) 79'; B. Farkas (yellow card) 86'; G. Horváth (yellow card) 90'	Stadium: Stadion Oláh Gábor Út; Attendance: 9,640; Referee: Zsolt Szabó

15 May 2010 28	Újpest FC	2–1	Debreceni VSC	Budapest
17:30 CEST	Korcsmár 60'; Barczi 83'; Vasiljević (yellow card) 53'; Kabát (red card) 63'	Report	Feczesin 70' (yellow card) 90'; Szélesi (yellow card) 37'; Komlósi (yellow card) 41'	Stadium: Szusza Ferenc Stadion; Attendance: 6,521; Referee: Zoltán Iványi

18 May 2010 29	Debreceni VSC	0–0	Győri ETO FC	Debrecen
20:00 CEST	Szakály (red card) 74'; Komlósi (yellow card) 76'	Report	Pilibaitis (yellow card) 39'; Đorđević (yellow card) 63'; Nicorec (yellow card) 66'; Józsi (red card) 90+2'	Stadium: Stadion Oláh Gábor Út; Attendance: 7,500; Referee: István II Vad

23 May 2010 30	Kecskeméti TE	1–0	Debreceni VSC	Kecskemét
17:30 CEST	Csordás 45'; Alempijević (yellow card) 19'; Bori (yellow card) 87'	Report	Feczesin (yellow card) 19'; Bodnár (yellow card) 33'; Coulibaly (yellow card) 87'	Stadium: Széktói Stadion; Attendance: 6,000; Referee: Zsolt Szabó

=== Hungarian Cup ===
7 October 2009 4	Nyírmadai ISE	2–8	Debreceni VSC	Nyírmada
15:00 CEST	Járomcsák 73'; Mátyus 81'	Report	Dudu 2', 55', 84', 85'; Coulibaly 19' (pen.), 65', 66'; Mijadinoski (yellow card) 28' (goal) 57'	Stadium: Városi Sporttelep; Attendance: 1,000; Referee: László Nyírcsák

22 October 2009 Round of 16 (1st leg)	Mezőkövesd-Zsóry SE	1–4	Debreceni VSC	Mezőkövesd
14:30 CEST	Toplenszki (yellow card) 1'; Sivák 71'; P. Kovács (red card) 76'	Report	Vinicius 2' (pen.), 90'; L. Oláh 6'; Korhut (yellow card) 21'; Mijadinoski 46'; Ramos (yellow card) 70'; Rezes (yellow card) 86'	Stadium: Városi Sporttelep; Attendance: 1,500; Referee: Ádám Farkas

28 October 2009 Round of 16 (2nd leg)	Debreceni VSC	4–3 (8–4 agg.)	Mezőkövesd-Zsóry SE	Debrecen
13:00 CEST	Rezes (41}), 85'; Dudu 50', 82'; G. Oláh (yellow card) 69'	Report	Pelicic (yellow card) 23'; Bogdány 35', 76'; Surányi 45'; T. Hegedűs (yellow card) 90'	Stadium: Egyetemi Sporttelep; Attendance: 1,000; Referee: Tibor Farkas

13 December 2009 Quarter-final (1st leg)	Debreceni VSC	2–0	MTK Budapest FC	Debrecen
17:30 CEST	Feczesin 45'; Czvitkovics 50'; Laczkó (yellow card) 87'; J. Varga (yellow card) 90+2'	Report	Vági (yellow card) 48'; Á. Pintér (yellow card) 77'; Zsidai (yellow card) 84'	Stadium: Stadion Oláh Gábor Út; Attendance: 1,000; Referee: István Vad

17 December 2009 Quarter-final (2nd leg)	MTK Budapest FC	2–0 (a.e.t.) (2–2 agg.) (4–5 p)	Debreceni VSC	Budapest
	Pátkai (yellow card) 53'; Vági (yellow card) 64'; A. Pál 77'; Zsidai 80' (yellow card) 90+2'	Report	Ramos (yellow card) 82'	Stadium: Stadion Hidegkuti Nándor; Attendance: 200; Referee: Mihály Fábián
	Penalties
	A. Pál (penalty scored); Zsidai (penalty scored); Melczer (penalty scored); Hidvégi (penalty scored); Nikházi (penalty missed)		(penalty scored) Czvitkovics; (penalty scored) Laczkó; (penalty scored) Fodor; (penalty scored) Feczesin; (penalty scored) Mijadinoski

23 March 2010 Semi-final (1st leg)	Budapest Honvéd FC	1–1	Debreceni VSC	Budapest
18:00 CEST	A. Horváth (yellow card) 45'; Vukmir (yellow card) 66'; Abraham 88'	Report	Z. Kiss (yellow card) 80'; Szilágyi 81'	Stadium: Bozsik Stadion; Attendance: 1,500; Referee: Iványi

13 April 2010 Semi-final (2nd leg)	Debreceni VSC	2–1 (3–2 agg.)	Budapest Honvéd FC	Debrecen
18:00 CEST	Yannick 34'; Bodnár (yellow card) 58'; Laczkó 85' (yellow card) 90'; Mészáros (yellow card) 87'	Report	Macko (yellow card) 39'; Palásthy (yellow card) 49'; Akassou (yellow card) 53'; Abraham 83'; Tavas (yellow card) 90'	Stadium: Stadion Oláh Gábor Út; Attendance: 2,500; Referee: István II. Vad

26 May 2010 Final	Debreceni VSC	3–2	Zalaegerszegi TE	Budapest
19:00 CEST	Komlósi (yellow card) 12'; Coulibaly 24', 68'; Yannick 31'; Laczkó (yellow card) 32'; Rezes (yellow card) 71'	Report	Pavićević 42'; P. Máté (yellow card) 64'; Rudņevs 70'; Horváth (yellow card) 71'	Stadium: Puskás Ferenc Stadium; Attendance: 4,000; Referee: István II. Vad

=== League Cup ===
==== Second group stage ====
16 February 2010 1	Debreceni VSC	2–2	Videoton FC Fehérvár	Debrecen
18:00 CET	Feczesin 40', 75'; Korhut (yellow card) 32'; Szélesi (red card) 90+1'	Report	Nikolić 55'; Radović 73'; Sitku (yellow card) 37'; Fejes A. (yellow card) 60'	Stadium: Stadion Oláh Gábor Út; Referee: Mihály Fábián

19 February 2010 2	Debreceni VSC	5–1	Nyíregyháza Spartacus FC	Debrecen
13:30 CET	Coulibaly 6', 57', 66'; Rudolf 22'; Czvitkovics 26'; Laczkó (yellow card) 53'	Report	Miskolczi 18'	Stadium: Stadion Oláh Gábor Út; Referee: Gábor Oláh

10 March 2010 3	Debreceni VSC	2–1	Budapest Honvéd FC	Debrecen
18:00 CET	Rezes 2'; Bodnár 60'; Lucas (yellow card) 44'	Report	Palásthy 40'	Stadium: Stadion Oláh Gábor Út; Referee: József Berger

16 March 2010 4	Videoton FC Fehérvár	0–2	Debreceni VSC	Székesfehérvár
17:00 CET	Andić (yellow card) 87'	Report	Szilágyi 6', 34'; Rezes (yellow card) 67'; Szélesi (yellow card) 85'	Stadium: Stadion Sóstói; Referee: Péter Solymosi

30 March 2010 5	Nyíregyháza Spartacus FC	0–4	Debreceni VSC	Nyíregyháza
18:00 CET	Davidov (red card) 26'; Alfi Conteh (yellow card) 32'	Report	Bíró 17'; Etogo 36', 55'; Lucas 65'	Stadium: Városi Stadion; Referee: Róbert Nagy

7 April 2010 6	Budapest Honvéd FC	0–2	Debreceni VSC	Budapest
14:00 CEST	Lengyel (yellow card) 20'; Vernes (yellow card) 25'	Report	Angyal 49'; Bíró 83'	Stadium: Bozsik Stadion

===== Classification =====
Pos	Team	Pld	W	D	L	GF	GA	GD	Pts	Qualification
1	Debrecen	6	5	1	0	17	4	+13	16	Advance to final
2	Videoton	6	3	2	1	7	5	+2	11	
3	Honvéd	6	1	2	3	8	8	0	5	
4	Nyíregyháza	6	0	1	5	2	17	−15	1	

Source: Hungarian Football Federation

==== Final ====
28 April 2010	Debreceni VSC	2–1	Paksi SE	Kecskemét
18:00 CEST	Bódi 23'; Szilágyi 76'; Bernáth (yellow card) 39'	Report	Völgyi 40'; Gévay (yellow card) 15'; Nikolov (yellow card) 32'; Urbán (yellow card) 54'	Stadium: Széktói Stadion; Attendance: 1,000; Referee: József Berger

=== Champions League ===
==== Qualifying round ====
15 July 2009 Q2 Leg 1	Debreceni VSC (Hungary)	2–0	(Sweden) Kalmar FF	Debrecen
20:00 CEST	Bernáth (yellow card) 65'; J. Varga (yellow card) 72' (goal) 73'; Z. Kiss 86'	Report		Stadium: Stadion Oláh Gábor Út; Attendance: 9,000; Referee: (France) Fredy Fautrel

22 July 2009 Q2 Leg 2	Kalmar FF (Sweden)	3–1 (3–3 (a) agg.)	(Hungary) Debreceni VSC	Kalmar
19:00 CEST	R. Elm 19' 71' (pen.) (yellow card) 89'; Mendes 32'; Rydström (yellow card) 46'	Report	J. Varga 13' (yellow card) 60'; Z. Kiss (yellow card) 45'; P. Máté (yellow card) 71' (yellow-red card) 86'; Leandro (yellow card) 72'; Dombi (yellow card) 79'	Stadium: Fredriksskans; Attendance: 4,000; Referee: (Russia) Stanislav Sukhina

29 July 2009 Q3 Leg 1	FC Levadia Tallinn (Estonia)	0–1	(Hungary) Debreceni VSC	Tallinn
18:00 CEST	Nahk (yellow card) 43'; Malov (yellow card) 58'; Andreev (yellow card) 80'	Report	Leandro (yellow card) 32' (goal) 70'; Coulibaly (yellow card) 72'	Stadium: Kadrioru Stadium; Attendance: 3,000; Referee: (Portugal) Bruno Miguel Duarte Paixao

5 August 2009 Q3 Leg 2	Debreceni VSC (Hungary)	1–0 (2–0 agg.)	(Estonia) FC Levadia Tallinn	Debrecen
20:00 CEST	J. Varga (yellow card) 22'; Rudolf (yellow card) 48'; Coulibaly 70'; Fodor (yellow card) 87'	Report	Malov (yellow card) 24' (yellow-red card) 80'; Saarelma (yellow card) 31'	Stadium: Stadion Oláh Gábor Út; Attendance: 11,000; Referee: (Slovenia) Damir Skomina

19 August 2009 Play off Leg 1	PFC Levski Sofia (Bulgaria)	1–2	(Hungary) Debreceni VSC	Sofia
20:45 CEST	Bardon 51'; Petkov (yellow card) 82'	Report	Bodnár 12'; Czvitkovics 76'; Z. Kiss (yellow card) 82'	Stadium: Georgi Asparuhov Stadium; Attendance: 22,000; Referee: (France) Laurent Duhamel

25 August 2009 Play off Leg 2	Debreceni VSC (Hungary)	2–0 (4–1 agg.)	(Bulgaria) PFC Levski Sofia	Budapest
20:45 CEST	J. Varga 13' (yellow card) 61'; Leandro (yellow card) 21'; Rudolf 35'; Ramos (yellow card) 37'; Dombi (yellow card) 76'	Report	Sarmov (yellow card) 9'; Zé Soares (yellow card) 52'	Stadium: Stadium Puskás Ferenc; Attendance: 34,000; Referee: (Denmark) Claus Bo Larsen

==== Group stage ====
16 September 2009 1	Liverpool FC (England)	1–0	(Hungary) Debreceni VSC	Liverpool
20:45 CEST	Gerrard (yellow card) 26'; Kuyt 45+1'	Report	Fodor (yellow card) 21'	Stadium: Anfield; Attendance: 41,591; Referee: (Portugal) Pedro Proença

29 September 2009 2	Debreceni VSC (Hungary)	0–4	(France) Olympique Lyonnais	Budapest
20:45 CEST	Szakály (yellow card) 58'	Report	Källström 2'; Pjanić 13'; Govou 24'; Gomis 51'; Gonalons (yellow card) 68'	Stadium: Stadium Puskás Ferenc; Attendance: 42,000; Referee: (Norway) Tom Henning Øvrebø

20 October 2009 3	Debreceni VSC (Hungary)	3–4	(Italy) AC Fiorentina	Budapest
20:45 CEST	Czvitkovics 2'; Rudolf 28' (yellow card) 28'; Bodnár (yellow card) 81'; Coulibaly 88'	Report	Mutu 6' 20'; Gilardino 10'; Donadel (yellow card) 16'; Santana 37'	Stadium: Stadium Puskás Ferenc; Attendance: 42,000; Referee: (Scotland) Craig Thomson

4 November 2009 4	AC Fiorentina (Italy)	5–2	(Hungary) Debreceni VSC	Florence
20:45 CEST	Mutu 14'; Dainelli (yellow card) 28' (goal) 52'; Montolivo 59'; Marchionni 61'; Gilardino 74'	Report	Ramos (yellow card) 27'; Rudolf 38'; Coulibaly 70'	Stadium: Stadio Artemio Franchi; Attendance: 19,676; Referee: (Spain) Manuel Mejuto González

24 November 2009 5	Debreceni VSC (Hungary)	0–1	(England) Liverpool FC	Budapest
20:45 CEST	Szélesi (yellow card) 23'	Report	Ngog 4'	Stadium: Stadium Puskás Ferenc; Attendance: 42,000; Referee: (Netherlands) Björn Kuipers

9 December 2009 6	Olympique Lyon (France)	4–0	(Hungary) Debreceni VSC	Lyon
20:45 CEST	Gomis 25'; Bastos 45'; Pjanić 59'; Cissokho 76'	Report	Ramos (yellow card) 39'	Stadium: Stade de Gerland; Attendance: 37,000; Referee: (Germany) Florian Meyer

===== Classification =====
Pos	Team	Pld	W	D	L	GF	GA	GD	Pts	Qualification
1	(Italy) Fiorentina	6	5	0	1	14	7	+7	15	Advance to knockout phase
2	(France) Lyon	6	4	1	1	12	3	+9	13	Advance to knockout phase
3	(England) Liverpool	6	2	1	3	5	7	−2	7	Transfer to Europa League
4	(Hungary) Debrecen	6	0	0	6	5	19	−14	0	

Source: RSSSF

== Statistics ==
=== Appearances and goals ===
Last updated on 1 May 2010.

No.	Pos	Nat	Player	Total		Soproni Liga		Champions League		Hungarian Cup		League Cup	
No.	Pos	Nat	Player	Apps	Goals	Apps	Goals	Apps	Goals	Apps	Goals	Apps	Goals
1	GK	(Montenegro) MNE	Vukašin Poleksić	26	-37	16	-23	10	-14	0	0	0	0
2	DF	(Hungary) HUN	István Szűcs	6	0	3	0	2	0	1	0	0	0
4	DF	(Hungary) HUN	Leandro Marcolini Pedroso de Almeida	23	4	13	3	9	1	1	0	0	0
5	DF	(Hungary) HUN	Dávid Mohl	1	0	1	0	0	0	0	0	0	0
6	MF	(Honduras) HON	Luis Arcangel Ramos Colon	23	0	14	0	5	0	4	0	0	0
7	MF	(Hungary) HUN	Tibor Dombi	27	0	16	0	9	0	2	0	0	0
8	FW	(Hungary) HUN	Zsombor Kerekes	2	0	0	0	0	0	2	0	0	0
10	DF	(Hungary) HUN	László Bodnár	21	1	11	0	8	1	2	0	0	0
11	FW	(Hungary) HUN	Róbert Feczesin	16	8	11	7	2	0	3	1	0	0
12	GK	(Serbia) SRB	Đorđe Pantić	13	-19	7	-6	2	-9	4	-4	0	0
13	MF	(Hungary) HUN	Bence Ludánszki	1	0	0	0	0	0	1	0	0	0
14	FW	(Hungary) HUN	Gergely Rudolf	23	10	13	7	10	3	0	0	0	0
15	MF	(Hungary) HUN	László Rezes	12	3	8	1	0	0	4	2	0	0
16	DF	(Hungary) HUN	Ádám Komlósi	22	1	10	1	9	0	3	0	0	0
17	DF	(Hungary) HUN	Norbert Mészáros	28	1	16	1	10	0	2	0	0	0
18	DF	(Hungary) HUN	Péter Máté	4	0	1	0	3	0	0	0	0	0
19	FW	(Brazil) BRA	Vinicius Galvão Leal	8	2	6	0	0	0	2	2	0	0
20	MF	(Cameroon) CMR	Mbengono Yannick	12	2	9	0	0	0	3	2	0	0
21	DF	(Hungary) HUN	Marcell Fodor	21	0	11	0	6	0	4	0	0	0
22	DF	(Hungary) HUN	Csaba Bernáth	19	0	10	0	5	0	4	0	0	0
23	DF	(Hungary) HUN	Péter Szilágyi	5	1	2	0	2	0	1	1	0	0
24	DF	(North Macedonia) MKD	Mirsad Mijadinoski	19	5	10	3	2	0	7	2	0	0
25	DF	(Hungary) HUN	Zoltán Szélesi	21	0	12	0	4	0	5	0	0	0
26	MF	(Hungary) HUN	Norbert Kardos	2	0	0	0	0	0	2	0	0	0
27	MF	(Hungary) HUN	Ádám Bódi	4	0	0	0	0	0	4	0	0	0
28	DF	(Hungary) HUN	Zoltán Nagy	2	0	2	0	0	0	0	0	0	0
29	MF	(Hungary) HUN	István Spitzmüller	4	0	1	0	0	0	3	0	0	0
30	MF	(Hungary) HUN	Zoltán Kiss	29	2	15	1	11	1	3	0	0	0
33	MF	(Hungary) HUN	József Varga	30	4	18	1	9	3	3	0	0	0
39	FW	(France) FRA	Adamo Coulibaly	41	21	25	13	10	3	6	5	0	0
41	FW	(Hungary) HUN	Lóránt Oláh	17	3	9	2	4	0	4	1	0	0
41	MF	(Hungary) HUN	Szilárd Éles	2	0	0	0	0	0	2	0	0	0
55	MF	(Hungary) HUN	Péter Szakály	39	6	22	6	12	0	5	0	0	0
57	DF	(Brazil) BRA	Hugo Leonardo Pereira Nascimento	2	0	0	0	0	0	2	0	0	0
60	MF	(Slovakia) SVK	Károly Czanik	1	0	1	0	0	0	0	0	0	0
69	DF	(Hungary) HUN	Mihály Korhut	5	0	2	0	0	0	3	0	0	0
77	MF	(Hungary) HUN	Péter Czvitkovics	40	11	23	8	12	2	5	1	0	0
77	DF	(Hungary) HUN	Gergő Oláh	1	0	0	0	0	0	1	0	0	0
81	MF	(Hungary) HUN	Attila Katona	7	0	4	0	2	0	1	0	0	0
86	MF	(Hungary) HUN	Zsolt Laczkó	29	2	18	1	6	0	5	1	0	0
87	GK	(Hungary) HUN	István Verpecz	7	-11	3	-3	0	0	4	-8	0	0
88	FW	(Hungary) HUN	Tamás Huszák	1	0	1	0	0	0	0	0	0	0
99	FW	(Nigeria) NGR	MacPherlin Dudu Omagbemi	9	6	5	0	1	0	3	6	0	0

=== Top scorers ===
Includes all competitive matches. The list is sorted by shirt number when total goals are equal.

Last updated on 3 December 2009

Position	Nation	Number	Name	Soproni Liga	Champions League	Hungarian Cup	League Cup	Total
1	(France)	39	Adamo Coulibaly	7	2	3	0	12
2	(Hungary)	14	Gergely Rudolf	4	2	0	0	6
3	(Hungary)	77	Péter Czvitkovics	4	2	0	0	6
4	(Nigeria)	99	Dudu Omagbemi	0	0	6	0	6
5	(Hungary)	55	Péter Szakály	5	0	0	0	5
6	(Hungary)	33	József Varga	1	3	0	0	4
7	(Hungary)	4	Leandro de Almeida	3	1	0	0	4
8	(Hungary)	41	Lóránt Oláh	2	0	1	0	3
9	(Hungary)	81	László Rezes	1	0	2	0	3
10	(Hungary)	30	Zoltán Kiss	1	1	0	0	2
11	(North Macedonia)	24	Mirsad Mijadinoski	0	0	2	0	2
12	(Brazil)	19	Vinicius Galvão Leal	0	0	2	0	2
13	(Hungary)	10	László Bodnár	0	1	0	0	1
14	(Hungary)	25	Ádám Komlósi	1	0	0	0	1
/	/	/	Own Goals	0	0	0	0	0
			TOTALS	29	12	16	0	57

=== Disciplinary record ===
Includes all competitive matches. Players with 1 card or more included only.

Last updated on 3 December 2009

Position	Nation	Number	Name	Soproni Liga		Champions League		Hungarian Cup		League Cup		Total (Hu Total)	
Position	Nation	Number	Name	Yellow card	Red card	Yellow card	Red card	Yellow card	Red card	Yellow card	Red card	Yellow card	Red card
DF	(Hungary)	2	István Szűcs	1	0	0	0	0	0	0	0	1 (1)	0 (0)
DF	(Hungary)	4	Leandro de Almeida	4	0	3	0	0	0	0	0	7 (4)	0 (0)
DF	(Hungary)	5	Dávid Mohl	1	0	0	0	0	0	0	0	1 (1)	0 (0)
DF	(Honduras)	6	Luis Ramos	2	0	1	0	1	0	0	0	4 (2)	0 (0)
MF	(Hungary)	7	Tibor Dombi	0	0	2	0	0	0	0	0	2 (0)	0 (0)
DF	(Hungary)	10	László Bodnár	1	0	1	0	0	0	0	0	2 (1)	0 (0)
GK	(Serbia)	12	Đorđe Pantić	1	0	0	0	0	0	0	0	1 (1)	0 (0)
FW	(Hungary)	14	Gergely Rudolf	2	0	2	0	0	0	0	0	4 (2)	0 (0)
MF	(Hungary)	15	László Rezes	0	0	0	0	1	0	0	0	1 (0)	0 (0)
DF	(Hungary)	16	Ádám Komlósi	2	1	0	0	0	0	0	0	2 (2)	1 (1)
DF	(Hungary)	18	Péter Máté	0	0	0	1	0	0	0	0	0 (0)	1 (0)
DF	(Hungary)	19	Ádám Komlósi	1	0	0	0	0	0	0	0	1 (1)	0 (0)
DF	(Hungary)	21	Marcell Fodor	2	0	2	0	0	0	0	0	4 (2)	0 (0)
DF	(Hungary)	22	Csaba Bernáth	2	0	1	0	0	0	0	0	3 (2)	0 (0)
FW	(Hungary)	23	Péter Szilágyi	0	1	0	0	0	0	0	0	0 (0)	1 (1)
DF	(North Macedonia)	24	Mirsad Mijadinoski	0	0	0	0	1	0	0	0	1 (0)	0 (0)
DF	(Hungary)	25	Zoltán Szélesi	1	0	0	0	0	0	0	0	1 (1)	0 (0)
MF	(Hungary)	30	Zoltán Kiss	1	0	2	0	0	0	0	0	3 (1)	0 (0)
MF	(Hungary)	33	József Varga	0	0	4	0	0	0	0	0	4 (0)	0 (0)
FW	(France)	39	Adamo Coulibaly	1	0	1	0	0	0	0	0	2 (1)	0 (0)
MF	(Hungary)	55	Péter Szakály	0	0	1	0	0	0	0	0	1 (0)	0 (0)
DF	(Hungary)	69	Mihály Korhut	1	0	0	0	1	0	0	0	2 (1)	0 (0)
MF	(Hungary)	77	Péter Czvitkovics	1	1	0	0	0	0	0	0	1 (1)	1 (1)
DF	(Hungary)	77	Gergő Oláh	0	0	0	0	1	0	0	0	1 (0)	0 (0)
FW	(Nigeria)	99	Dudu Omagbemi	1	0	0	0	0	0	0	0	1 (1)	0 (0)
			TOTALS	25	3	20	1	5	0	0	0	50 (25)	4 (3)

=== Overall ===
Games played	30 (14 Soproni Liga, 12 UEFA Champions League, 3 Magyar Kupa and 0 Ligakupa)
Games won	18 (10 Soproni Liga, 5 UEFA Champions League, 3 Magyar Kupa and 0 Ligakupa)
Games drawn	1 (1 Soproni Liga, 0 UEFA Champions League, 0 Magyar Kupa and 0 Ligakupa)
Games lost	11 (4 Soproni Liga, 7 UEFA Champions League, 0 Magyar Kupa and 0 Ligakupa)
Goals scored	59
Goals conceded	49
Goal difference	+10
Yellow cards	53
Red cards	4
Worst discipline	(Hungary) (Brazil) Leandro de Almeida (7 (yellow card) , 0 (red card) )
Best result	8–2 (A) v Nyírmadai ISE – Magyar Kupa – 2009.10.07
Worst result	0–4 (H) v Olympique Lyonnais – UEFA Champions League – 2009.09.29
Worst result	4–0 (A) v Olympique Lyonnais – UEFA Champions League – 2009.12.09
Most appearances	(Hungary) Péter Czvitkovics (26 appearances)
Most appearances	(France) (Mali) Adamo Coulibaly (26 appearances)
Top scorer	(France) (Mali) Adamo Coulibaly (13 goals)
Points	55/90 (60.44%)

Last updated: 3 December
Source: Debreceni VSC
