= 2013–14 Mezőkövesdi SE season =

Mezőkövesd-Zsóry SE
2013–14 season
- Chairman: (Hungary) Anna Bocsi
- Manager: (Hungary) György Véber (until 5 May 2014) (Hungary) László Tóth
- Stadium: Városi Stadion
- NB 1: 15th (relegated)
- Hungarian Cup: Round of 32
- Hungarian League Cup: Round of 16
- Top goalscorer: League: (Cameroon) George Menougong (6); All: (Slovakia) Zoltán Harsányi (8) (Hungary) Ádám Balajti (8)
- Highest home attendance: 5,000 vs Ferencváros (3 May 2014)
- Lowest home attendance: 600 vs Nyíregyháza (15 October 2013)
Home colours	Away colours

The 2013–14 season will be Mezőkövesd SE's 1st competitive season, 1st consecutive season in the OTP Bank Liga and 38th year in existence as a football club.

== First team squad ==
Note: Flags indicate national team as defined under FIFA eligibility rules; some limited exceptions apply. Players may hold more than one non-FIFA nationality.

No.	Pos.	Nation	Player
1	GK	HUN	Levente Szántai
3	DF	HUN	Vilmos Szalai
5	DF	HUN	Zsolt Gévay
7	MF	HUN	István Bognár
10	FW	CMR	George Menougong
11	FW	HUN	Ádám Balajti (loan from Debrecen)
12	FW	HUN	Péter Rajczi
13	FW	HUN	Dénes Olasz
14	MF	HUN	Balázs Farkas
15	MF	HUN	Zoltán Búrány
16	MF	HUN	István Csirmaz
18	MF	HUN	Máté Kiss (loan from Győr)
20	MF	HUN	Péter Takács
21	DF	HUN	Szilárd Éles

No.	Pos.	Nation	Player
23	FW	HUN	Tamás Sárközi
24	MF	HUN	Dávid Hegedűs
25	DF	HUN	Krisztián Vermes
26	DF	SVK	Stanislav Velický
28	DF	HUN	Csaba Hegedűs
29	FW	SVK	Zoltán Harsányi
31	GK	HUN	Tamás Horváth
33	MF	HUN	Vilmos Melczer
38	DF	SVK	Dominik Fótyik
77	MF	HUN	Zoltán Szilvási
88	MF	HUN	Dávid Sigér (loan from Debrecen)
91	GK	HUN	Dávid Ficsór
99	MF	HUN	Attila Dobos

== Transfers ==
=== Summer ===
In: Note: Flags indicate national team as defined under FIFA eligibility rules; some limited exceptions apply. Players may hold more than one non-FIFA nationality.

No.	Pos.	Nation	Player
5	DF	HUN	Zsolt Gévay (from Gyirmót)
11	FW	HUN	Ádám Balajti (loan from Debrecen)
15	MF	HUN	Zoltán Búrány (from Szombathely)
24	MF	HUN	Dávid Hegedűs (from Kaposvár)
29	FW	SVK	Zoltán Harsányi (from (Slovakia) Myjava)
31	GK	HUN	Tamás Horváth (from Újpest)
33	MF	HUN	Vilmos Melczer (from Siófok)
38	DF	SVK	Dominik Fótyik (from (Slovakia) Žilina)
66	MF	HUN	Máté Kiss (loan from Győr)
77	MF	LTU	Linas Pilibaitis (loan from Győr)
—	FW	HUN	Attila Bene (loan return from Putnok)
—	FW	HUN	Viktor Szabó (loan return from BKV Előre)

Out: Note: Flags indicate national team as defined under FIFA eligibility rules; some limited exceptions apply. Players may hold more than one non-FIFA nationality.

No.	Pos.	Nation	Player
5	DF	HUN	Balázs Bényei (loan return to Debrecen II)
7	FW	HUN	Tamás Kemény
15	DF	HUN	Péter Nagy
19	MF	HUN	Norbert Lipusz (to Cegléd)
30	DF	HUN	Norbert Kardos (loan return to Gyirmót)
—	FW	HUN	Attila Bene
—	FW	HUN	Viktor Szabó (to Kazincbarcika)
—	FW	HUN	János Farkas

=== Winter ===
In: Note: Flags indicate national team as defined under FIFA eligibility rules; some limited exceptions apply. Players may hold more than one non-FIFA nationality.

No.	Pos.	Nation	Player
12	FW	HUN	Péter Rajczi (from Kecskemét)
20	MF	HUN	Péter Takács (from Diósgyőr)
25	DF	HUN	Krisztián Vermes (from Újpest)
26	DF	HUN	Tamás Vaskó (from Videoton)
26	DF	SVK	Stanislav Velický (from (Slovakia) Dunajská Streda)
—	MF	HUN	Attila Sebe (loan return from Hatvan)

Out: Note: Flags indicate national team as defined under FIFA eligibility rules; some limited exceptions apply. Players may hold more than one non-FIFA nationality.

No.	Pos.	Nation	Player
9	MF	HUN	Csaba Bogdány (loan to Felsőtárkány)
12	MF	HUN	Márk Petneházi (to Dunaújváros)
17	FW	HUN	Ádám Hamar (to Szolnok)
18	MF	HUN	Béla Lakatos
20	MF	HUN	Ignác Irhás (to Kisvárda)
22	DF	HUN	István Bagi (to Békéscsaba)
26	DF	HUN	Tamás Vaskó (to Puskás)
77	MF	LTU	Linas Pilibaitis (loan return to Győr)
—	MF	HUN	Attila Sebe

- List of Hungarian football transfers summer 2013
- List of Hungarian football transfers winter 2013–14

== Statistics ==
=== Appearances and goals ===
Last updated on 1 June 2014.

No.	Pos	Nat	Player	Total		OTP Bank Liga		Hungarian Cup		League Cup	
No.	Pos	Nat	Player	Apps	Goals	Apps	Goals	Apps	Goals	Apps	Goals
1	GK	(Hungary) HUN	Levente Szántai	13	-27	10	-20	0	0	3	-7
3	DF	(Hungary) HUN	Vilmos Szalai	36	2	26	2	3	0	7	0
5	DF	(Hungary) HUN	Zsolt Gévay	28	1	20	0	3	0	5	1
7	MF	(Hungary) HUN	István Bognár	33	6	24	2	3	0	6	4
10	FW	(Cameroon) CMR	George Menougong	37	7	26	6	4	0	7	1
11	FW	(Hungary) HUN	Ádám Balajti	33	8	24	4	2	1	7	3
12	FW	(Hungary) HUN	Péter Rajczi	9	0	7	0	0	0	2	0
13	FW	(Hungary) HUN	Dénes Olasz	21	6	13	1	4	4	4	1
14	MF	(Hungary) HUN	Balázs Farkas	19	0	17	0	0	0	2	0
15	MF	(Hungary) HUN	Zoltán Búrány	22	0	15	0	2	0	5	0
16	MF	(Hungary) HUN	István Csirmaz	1	0	1	0	0	0	0	0
18	MF	(Hungary) HUN	Máté Kiss	26	1	18	0	1	0	7	1
20	MF	(Hungary) HUN	Péter Takács	12	0	11	0	0	0	1	0
21	DF	(Hungary) HUN	Szilárd Éles	11	0	6	0	2	0	3	0
23	FW	(Hungary) HUN	Tamás Sárközi	1	0	1	0	0	0	0	0
24	MF	(Hungary) HUN	Dávid Hegedűs	34	0	28	0	2	0	4	0
25	DF	(Hungary) HUN	Krisztián Vermes	4	0	3	0	0	0	1	0
26	DF	(Slovakia) SVK	Stanislav Velický	14	0	12	0	0	0	2	0
28	DF	(Hungary) HUN	Csaba Hegedűs	23	1	17	0	2	0	4	1
29	FW	(Slovakia) SVK	Zoltán Harsányi	28	8	22	5	2	1	4	2
31	GK	(Hungary) HUN	Tamás Horváth	30	-40	21	-28	4	-5	5	-7
33	MF	(Hungary) HUN	Vilmos Melczer	28	5	21	5	2	0	5	0
77	MF	(Hungary) HUN	Zoltán Szilvási	1	0	1	0	0	0	0	0
38	DF	(Slovakia) SVK	Dominik Fótyik	27	2	20	0	2	0	5	2
88	MF	(Hungary) HUN	Dávid Sigér	9	1	4	0	3	1	2	0
91	GK	(Hungary) HUN	Dávid Ficsór	1	-4	1	-4	0	0	0	0
99	MF	(Hungary) HUN	Attila Dobos	22	0	17	0	2	0	3	0
Youth players:
Out to loan:
9	MF	(Hungary) HUN	Csaba Bogdány	9	1	5	0	1	1	3	0
Players no longer at the club:
12	MF	(Hungary) HUN	Márk Petneházi	13	3	6	1	3	1	4	1
17	FW	(Hungary) HUN	Ádám Hamar	3	2	1	0	1	2	1	0
18	MF	(Hungary) HUN	Béla Lakatos	2	0	1	0	1	0	0	0
20	MF	(Hungary) HUN	Ignác Irhás	5	0	2	0	2	0	1	0
22	DF	(Hungary) HUN	István Bagi	7	0	3	0	2	0	2	0
26	DF	(Hungary) HUN	Tamás Vaskó	5	2	3	0	0	0	2	2
77	MF	(Lithuania) LTU	Linas Pilibaitis	18	1	11	1	2	0	5	0

=== Top scorers ===
Includes all competitive matches. The list is sorted by shirt number when total goals are equal.

Last updated on 1 June 2014

Position	Nation	Number	Name	OTP Bank Liga	Hungarian Cup	League Cup	Total
1	(Slovakia)	29	Zoltán Harsányi	5	1	2	8
2	(Hungary)	11	Ádám Balajti	4	1	3	8
3	(Cameroon)	10	George Menougong	6	0	1	7
4	(Hungary)	7	István Bognár	2	0	4	6
5	(Hungary)	13	Dénes Olasz	1	4	1	6
6	(Hungary)	33	Vilmos Melczer	5	0	0	5
7	(Hungary)	12	Márk Petneházi	1	1	1	3
8	(Hungary)	3	Vilmos Szalai	2	0	0	2
9	(Hungary)	17	Ádám Hamar	0	2	0	2
10	(Hungary)	26	Tamás Vaskó	0	0	2	2
11	(Slovakia)	38	Dominik Fótyik	0	0	2	2
12	(Lithuania)	77	Linas Pilibaitis	1	0	0	1
13	(Hungary)	88	Dávid Sigér	0	1	0	1
14	(Hungary)	9	Csaba Bogdány	0	1	0	1
15	(Hungary)	5	Zsolt Gévay	0	0	1	1
16	(Hungary)	18	Máté Kiss	0	0	1	1
17	(Hungary)	28	Csaba Hegedűs	0	0	1	1
/	/	/	Own Goals	0	0	0	0
			TOTALS	27	11	19	57

=== Disciplinary record ===
Includes all competitive matches. Players with 1 card or more included only.

Last updated on 1 June 2014

Position	Nation	Number	Name	OTP Bank Liga		Hungarian Cup		League Cup		Total (Hu Total)	
Position	Nation	Number	Name	Booked	Sent off (straight red)	Booked	Sent off (straight red)	Booked	Sent off (straight red)	Booked	Sent off (straight red)
GK	(Hungary)	1	Levente Szántai	0	1	0	0	0	0	0 (0)	1 (1)
DF	(Hungary)	3	Vilmos Szalai	7	0	1	0	2	0	10 (7)	0 (0)
DF	(Hungary)	5	Zsolt Gévay	5	0	1	0	0	0	6 (5)	0 (0)
MF	(Hungary)	7	István Bognár	2	0	0	0	0	0	2 (2)	0 (0)
MF	(Hungary)	9	Csaba Bogdány	3	0	0	0	0	0	3 (3)	0 (0)
FW	(Cameroon)	10	George Menougong	1	1	0	0	1	0	2 (1)	1 (1)
FW	(Hungary)	11	Ádám Balajti	4	0	0	0	0	0	4 (4)	0 (0)
FW	(Hungary)	12	Péter Rajczi	3	0	0	0	0	0	3 (3)	0 (0)
MF	(Hungary)	12	Márk Petneházi	1	0	1	0	0	0	2 (1)	0 (0)
MF	(Hungary)	14	Balázs Farkas	2	0	0	0	0	0	2 (2)	0 (0)
MF	(Hungary)	15	Zoltán Búrány	1	0	0	0	0	0	1 (1)	0 (0)
MF	(Hungary)	18	Máté Kiss	3	0	0	0	0	0	3 (3)	0 (0)
MF	(Hungary)	20	Ignác Irhás	1	0	0	0	0	0	1 (1)	0 (0)
MF	(Hungary)	20	Péter Takács	4	0	0	0	0	0	4 (4)	0 (0)
DF	(Hungary)	21	Szilárd Éles	2	0	1	0	1	0	4 (2)	0 (0)
DF	(Hungary)	22	István Bagi	0	0	0	0	1	0	1 (0)	0 (0)
MF	(Hungary)	24	Dávid Hegedűs	4	0	0	0	0	0	4 (4)	0 (0)
DF	(Hungary)	25	Krisztián Vermes	0	2	0	0	0	0	0 (0)	2 (2)
DF	(Hungary)	26	Tamás Vaskó	1	0	0	0	1	0	2 (1)	0 (0)
DF	(Slovakia)	26	Stanislav Velický	6	0	0	0	1	0	7 (6)	0 (0)
DF	(Hungary)	28	Csaba Hegedűs	6	1	1	0	0	0	7 (6)	1 (1)
FW	(Slovakia)	29	Zoltán Harsányi	5	1	1	0	2	0	8 (5)	1 (1)
GK	(Hungary)	31	Tamás Horváth	1	1	0	0	0	0	1 (1)	1 (1)
MF	(Hungary)	33	Vilmos Melczer	5	0	0	0	0	0	5 (5)	0 (0)
DF	(Slovakia)	38	Dominik Fótyik	6	1	0	0	2	0	8 (6)	1 (1)
MF	(Lithuania)	77	Linas Pilibaitis	3	0	0	0	0	0	3 (3)	0 (0)
MF	(Hungary)	99	Attila Dobos	5	0	0	0	1	0	6 (5)	0 (0)
			TOTALS	80	8	7	0	12	0	99 (81)	8 (8)

=== Overall ===
Games played	42 (30 OTP Bank Liga, 4 Hungarian Cup and 8 Hungarian League Cup)
Games won	13 (6 OTP Bank Liga, 3 Hungarian Cup and 4 Hungarian League Cup)
Games drawn	7 (6 OTP Bank Liga, 0 Hungarian Cup and 1 Hungarian League Cup)
Games lost	22 (18 OTP Bank Liga, 1 Hungarian Cup and 3 Hungarian League Cup)
Goals scored	57
Goals conceded	71
Goal difference	-14
Yellow cards	99
Red cards	8
Worst discipline	(Slovakia) Zoltán Harsányi (8 (yellow card) , 1 (red card) )
Worst discipline	(Slovakia) Dominik Fótyik (8 (yellow card) , 1 (red card) )
Worst discipline	(Hungary) Vilmos Szalai (10 (yellow card) , 0 (red card) )
Best result	7–1 (A) v Balmazújváros – Ligakupa – 20-11-2013
Worst result	1–6 (A) v Újpest – OTP Bank Liga – 24-08-2013
Worst result	0–5 (A) v Diósgyőr – OTP Bank Liga – 05-10-2013
Worst result	0–5 (A) v Győr – OTP Bank Liga – 31-05-2014
Most appearances	(Cameroon) George Menougong (37 appearances)
Top scorer	(Slovakia) Zoltán Harsányi (8 goals)
Top scorer	(Hungary) Ádám Balajti (8 goals)
Points	46/126 (36.51%)

Last updated: 1 June 2014

== Nemzeti Bajnokság I ==
=== Matches ===
27 July 2013 1	MTK	3–0	Mezőkövesd	Budapest, Pest County
19:00 CEST	Pölöskei 51'; Ladányi 79'; Varga 88'	(Report)		Stadium: Hidegkuti Nándor Stadium; Attendance: 1,500; Referee: (Hungary) Dániel Becséri

4 August 2013 2	Debrecen	1–0	Mezőkövesd	Debrecen, Hajdú-Bihar County
20:30 CEST	Szakály 80'	(Report)		Stadium: Stadion Oláh Gábor Út; Attendance: 3,500; Referee: (Hungary) István Vad

10 August 2013 3	Kecskemét	2–6	Mezőkövesd	Kecskemét, Bács-Kiskun County
16:30 CEST	Rajczi 42' (pen.); Koszó 55'	(Report)	Szalai 13'; Melczer 21' (pen.); Balajti 26'; Bognár 47'; Menougong 70'; Olasz 88'	Stadium: Széktói Stadion; Attendance: 2,500; Referee: (Hungary) Ádám Farkas

17 August 2013 4	Mezőkövesd	0–2	Pápa	Mezőkövesd, Borsod-Abaúj-Zemplén County
19:00 CEST		(Report)	Griffiths 4', 30'	Stadium: Városi Stadion; Attendance: 4,000; Referee: (Hungary) Viktor Kassai

24 August 2013 5	Újpest	6–1	Mezőkövesd	Budapest, Pest County
21:00 CEST	Simon 31', 50'; Ahjupera 45', 64'; Tshibuabua 82'; Kabát 90'	(Report)	Menougong 15'	Stadium: Szusza Ferenc Stadium; Attendance: 1,985; Referee: (Hungary) Péter Solymosi

31 August 2013 6	Mezőkövesd	3–1	Puskás	Mezőkövesd, Borsod-Abaúj-Zemplén County
19:00 CEST	Petneházi 49'; Balajti 56'; Menougong 90+2'	(Report)	Lencse 62'	Stadium: Városi Stadion; Attendance: 3,500; Referee: (Hungary) Zsolt Szabó

14 September 2013 7	Honvéd	0–2	Mezőkövesd	Budapest, Pest County
18:00 CEST		(Report)	Harsányi 29'; Pilibaitis 57'	Stadium: Bozsik Stadion; Attendance: 600; Referee: (Hungary) Tamás Bognár

21 September 2013 8	Mezőkövesd	1–3	Kaposvár	Mezőkövesd, Borsod-Abaúj-Zemplén County
18:00 CEST	Harsányi 90+2' (pen.)	(Report)	Thian 2'; Mărkuş 4'; Balázs 59'	Stadium: Városi Stadion; Attendance: 2,900; Referee: (Hungary) Dániel Becséri

27 September 2013 9	Paks	1–1	Mezőkövesd	Paks, Tolna County
19:00 CEST	Simon 38' (pen.)	(Report)	Harsányi 31'	Stadium: Stadion PSE; Attendance: 800; Referee: (Hungary) Viktor Kassai

6 October 2013 10	Diósgyőr	5–0	Mezőkövesd	Miskolc, Borsod-Abaúj-Zemplén County
16:00 CEST	Futács 34', 54' (pen.); Bacsa 66', 84'; Batioja 80'	(Report)		Stadium: DVTK Stadion; Attendance: 5,705; Referee: (Hungary) Tamás Bognár

18 October 2013 11	Mezőkövesd	0–2	Szombathely	Mezőkövesd, Borsod-Abaúj-Zemplén County
19:00 CEST		(Report)	Fótyik 7' (o.g.); Radó 64'	Stadium: Városi Stadion; Attendance: 1,800; Referee: (Hungary) Zsolt Szabó

26 October 2013 12	Ferencváros	1–1	Mezőkövesd	Budapest, Pest County
16:00 CEST	Diallo 68'	(Report)	Szalai 41'	Stadium: Ferenc Puskás Stadium; Attendance: 5,687; Referee: (Hungary) Péter Solymosi

2 November 2013 13	Mezőkövesd	0–1	Pécs	Mezőkövesd, Borsod-Abaúj-Zemplén County
16:00 CET		(Report)	Fodor 54'	Stadium: Városi Stadion; Attendance: 2,800; Referee: (Hungary) Tamás Bognár

8 November 2013 14	Videoton	1–0	Mezőkövesd	Székesfehérvár, Fejér County
19:00 CET	Kleinheisler 87'	(Report)		Stadium: Sóstói Stadion; Attendance: 2,305; Referee: (Hungary) József Erdős

23 November 2013 15	Mezőkövesd	3–0	Győr	Mezőkövesd, Borsod-Abaúj-Zemplén County
20:00 CET	Melczer 29'; Balajti 81'; Harsányi 90+1'	(Report)		Stadium: Városi Stadion; Attendance: 2,200; Referee: (Hungary) Zoltán Iványi

30 November 2013 16	Mezőkövesd	1–0	MTK	Mezőkövesd, Borsod-Abaúj-Zemplén County
18:00 CET	Melczer 58'	(Report)		Stadium: Városi Stadion; Attendance: 2,000; Referee: (Hungary) József Erdős

6 December 2013 17	Mezőkövesd	2–2	Debrecen	Mezőkövesd, Borsod-Abaúj-Zemplén County
19:00 CET	Melczer 68' (pen.); Harsányi 82'	(Report)	Kulcsár 28'; Bouadla 53'	Stadium: Városi Stadion; Attendance: 1,000; Referee: (Hungary) István Vad

1 March 2014 18	Mezőkövesd	0–1	Kecskemét	Mezőkövesd, Borsod-Abaúj-Zemplén County
20:00 CET		(Report)	Bebeto 70'	Stadium: Városi Stadion; Attendance: 2,000; Referee: (Hungary) Zoltán Iványi

7 March 2014 19	Pápa	1–1	Mezőkövesd	Pápa, Veszprém County
19:00 CET	Csizmadia 89'	(Report)	Menougong 78'	Stadium: Stadion Várkerti; Attendance: 1,500; Referee: (Hungary) István Vad

16 March 2014 20	Mezőkövesd	0–1	Újpest	Mezőkövesd, Borsod-Abaúj-Zemplén County
14:30 CET		(Report)	Balogh 89'	Stadium: Városi Stadion; Attendance: 2,500; Referee: (Hungary) Sándor Andó-Szabó

22 March 2014 21	Puskás	4–0	Mezőkövesd	Székesfehérvár, Fejér County
16:00 CET	Lencse 45', 67', 88' (pen.); Tischler 63'	(Report)		Stadium: Sóstói Stadion; Attendance: 300; Referee: (Hungary) József Erdős

28 March 2014 22	Mezőkövesd	1–0	Honvéd	Mezőkövesd, Borsod-Abaúj-Zemplén County
19:00 CET	Menougong 26'	(Report)		Stadium: Városi Stadion; Attendance: 2,800; Referee: (Hungary) Péter Solymosi

7 April 2014 23	Kaposvár	1–0	Mezőkövesd	Kaposvár, Somogy County
20:45 CEST	Coroian 50'	(Report)		Stadium: Stadion Kaposvár Rákóczi; Attendance: 800; Referee: (Hungary) Zsolt Szabó

12 April 2014 24	Mezőkövesd	2–2	Paks	Mezőkövesd, Borsod-Abaúj-Zemplén County
16:00 CEST	Bognár 4'; Menougong 29'	(Report)	Windecker 47'; Simon 50'	Stadium: Városi Stadion; Attendance: 1,800; Referee: (Hungary) Ádám Farkas

20 April 2014 25	Mezőkövesd	0–1	Diósgyőr	Mezőkövesd, Borsod-Abaúj-Zemplén County
18:30 CEST		(Report)	Bacsa 90'	Stadium: Városi Stadion; Attendance: 4,000; Referee: (Hungary) István Vad

26 April 2014 26	Haladás	1–0	Mezőkövesd	Szombathely, Vas County
16:00 CEST	Radó 79'	(Report)		Stadium: Rohonci Street Stadium; Attendance: 2,420; Referee: (Hungary) Dániel Becséri

3 May 2014 27	Mezőkövesd	0–1	Ferencváros	Mezőkövesd, Borsod-Abaúj-Zemplén County
16:00 CEST		(Report)	Busai 29'	Stadium: Városi Stadion; Attendance: 5,000; Referee: (Hungary) Zsolt Szabó

10 May 2014 28	Pécs	2–1	Mezőkövesd	Pécs, Baranya County
16:00 CEST	Szalai 39' (o.g.); Márkvárt 90+2'	(Report)	Balajti 29'	Stadium: Stadion PMFC; Attendance: 1,000; Referee: (Hungary) István Vad

18 May 2014 29	Mezőkövesd	1–1	Videoton	Mezőkövesd, Borsod-Abaúj-Zemplén County
18:30 CEST	Melczer 47'	(Report)	Haraszti 90'	Stadium: Városi Stadion; Attendance: 2,400; Referee: (Hungary) Zoltán Iványi

31 May 2014 30	Győr	5–0	Mezőkövesd	Győr-Gyirmót, Győr-Moson-Sopron County
20:00 CEST	Lang 28'; Wolfe 36'; Trajković 79'; Đorđević 83'; Kronaveter 87'	(Report)		Stadium: Stadion Ménfői Street; Attendance: 2,800; Referee: (Hungary) József Erdős

=== Classification ===
Pos	Team	Pld	W	D	L	GF	GA	GD	Pts	Qualification or relegation
12	Pápa	30	9	6	15	32	50	−18	33	
13	Újpest	30	8	8	14	46	51	−5	32	
14	Puskás Akadémia	30	8	7	15	36	51	−15	31	
15	Mezőkövesd (R)	30	6	6	18	27	52	−25	24	Relegation to Nemzeti Bajnokság II
16	Kaposvár (R)	30	4	7	19	21	54	−33	19	Relegation to Nemzeti Bajnokság II

Source: mlsz.hu (in Hungarian)
Rules for classification: 1st points; 2nd overall wins; 3rd goal difference; 4th head-to-head points; 5th head-to-head goal difference; 6th head-to-head away goals scored; 7th fair-play points; 8th drawing of lots
(R) Relegated

=== Results summary ===
Overall								Home						Away					
Pld	W	D	L	GF	GA	GD	Pts	W	D	L	GF	GA	GD	W	D	L	GF	GA	GD
30	6	6	18	27	52	−25	24	4	3	8	14	18	−4	2	3	10	13	34	−21

Last updated: 1 June 2014.
Source: NB1

=== Results by round ===
Round	1	2	3	4	5	6	7	8	9	10	11	12	13	14	15	16	17	18	19	20	21	22	23	24	25	26	27	28	29	30
Ground	A	A	A	H	A	H	A	H	A	A	H	A	H	A	H	H	H	H	A	H	A	H	A	H	H	A	H	A	H	A
Result	L	L	W	L	L	W	W	L	D	L	L	D	L	L	W	W	D	L	D	L	L	W	L	D	L	L	L	L	D	L
Position	15	15	10	11	15	13	10	10	12	13	14	15	15	15	13	12	12	13	13	13	13	13	13	14	14	15	15	15	15	15

Updated to match(es) played on 1 June 2014. Source: Matches
A = Away; H = Home; W = Win; D = Draw; L = Loss

== Hungarian Cup ==
7 August 2013 Round 1	Szolnok	0–1	Mezőkövesd	Szolnok, Jász-Nagykun-Szolnok County
20:00 CEST		(Report)	Balajti 63'	Stadium: Tiszaligeti Stadion; Attendance: 600; Referee: (Hungary) Gábor Oláh

28 August 2013 Round 2	Kunszállás	0–5	Mezőkövesd	Kunszállás, Bács-Kiskun County
16:30 CEST		(Report)	Petneházi 18'; Sigér 24'; Hamar 72', 78'; Bogdány 80'	Stadium: Kunszállási Sporttelep; Attendance: 200; Referee: (Hungary) László Lovas

24 September 2013 Round 3	Kazincbarcika	3–4	Mezőkövesd	Kazincbarcika, Borsod-Abaúj-Zemplén County
15:00 CEST	Nyitrai 7'; Molnár 35'; Szabó 52'	(Report)	Olasz 40', 53', 75', 87'	Stadium: Pete András Stadion; Attendance: 400; Referee: (Hungary) Balázs Berke

30 October 2013 Round of 32	Pécs	2–1	Mezőkövesd	Pécs, Baranya County
18:00 CET	Koller 19'; Szatmári 51'	(Report)	Harsányi 54'	Stadium: Stadion PMFC; Attendance: 1,500; Referee: (Hungary) Csaba Pintér

== League Cup ==
=== Group stage ===
4 September 2013 1	Mezőkövesd	2–1	Balmazújváros	Mezőkövesd, Borsod-Abaúj-Zemplén County
19:00 CEST	Harsányi 66'; Olasz 68'	(Report)	Belényesi 42'	Stadium: Városi Stadion; Attendance: 800; Referee: (Hungary) János Takács

11 September 2013 2	Mezőkövesd	0–2	Debrecen	Mezőkövesd, Borsod-Abaúj-Zemplén County
19:00 CEST		(Report)	Dombi 41'; Trninić 58'	Stadium: Városi Stadion; Attendance: 800; Referee: (Hungary) Balázs Böcskei

9 October 2013 3	Nyíregyháza	3–1	Mezőkövesd	Nyíregyháza, Szabolcs-Szatmár-Bereg County
16:00 CEST	Patály 8'; Katona 84'; Reznek 87'	(Report)	Gévay 65'	Stadium: Városi Stadion; Attendance: 500; Referee: (Hungary) László Varga

15 October 2013 4	Mezőkövesd	2–2	Nyíregyháza	Mezőkövesd, Borsod-Abaúj-Zemplén County
17:00 CEST	Balajti 56', 78'	(Report)	Huszák 10'; Reznek 80'	Stadium: Városi Stadion; Attendance: 600; Referee: (Hungary) Gábor Oláh

13 November 2013 5	Debrecen	2–4	Mezőkövesd	Debrecen, Hajdú-Bihar County
13:30 CET	Seydi 60'; Szalai 72' (o.g.)	(Report)	Vaskó 17'; Harsányi 25'; Bognár 70', 88'	Stadium: Stadion Oláh Gábor Út; Attendance: 1,000; Referee: (Hungary) László Lovas

20 November 2013 6	Balmazújváros	1–7	Mezőkövesd	Balmazújváros, Hajdú-Bihar County
13:00 CET	Tóth 80'	(Report)	Vaskó 14'; Kiss 31'; Balajti 50'; Menougong 55'; Bognár 58', 82'; Petneházi 68'	Stadium: Batthyány utcai Sportpálya; Attendance: 200; Referee: (Hungary) László Varga

==== Classification ====
Pos	Team	Pld	W	D	L	GF	GA	GD	Pts	Qualification
1	Debrecen	6	5	0	1	16	5	+11	15	Advance to knockout phase
2	Mezőkövesd	6	3	1	2	16	11	+5	10	Advance to knockout phase
3	Nyíregyháza	6	1	2	3	5	11	−6	5	
4	Balmazújváros	6	1	1	4	6	16	−10	4	

Rules for classification: 1) points; 2) goal difference; 3) number of goals scored.

=== Knockout phase ===
26 February 2014 Round of 16 (1st leg)	Mezőkövesd	3–1	Diósgyőr	Mezőkövesd, Borsod-Abaúj-Zemplén County
18:00 CET	Hegedűs 24'; Fótyik 57', 88'	(Report)	Futács 26'	Stadium: Városi Stadion; Attendance: 3,000; Referee: (Hungary) Sándor Andó-Szabó

4 March 2014 Round of 16 (2nd leg)	Diósgyőr	2–0 ((a) 3 – 3 agg.)	Mezőkövesd	Miskolc, Borsod-Abaúj-Zemplén County
17:00 CET	Gosztonyi 11' (pen.); Batioja 51'	(Report)		Stadium: DVTK Stadion; Attendance: 1,300; Referee: (Hungary) Péter Solymosi

== Pre-season ==
29 June 2013 1	Sajószöged (Hungary)	0–21	(Hungary) Mezőkövesd-Zsóry SE	Sajószöged, Borsod-Abaúj-Zemplén County
CEST		(Report)	Olasz; Hamar; Szalai; Sigér; Melczer; Dobos; Lakatos; Bogdány; Irhás	Stadium: Városi Sporttelep; Attendance: 200

6 July 2013 2	Diósgyőri VTK (Hungary)	1–0	(Hungary) Mezőkövesd-Zsóry SE	Miskolc, Borsod-Abaúj-Zemplén County
CEST	Takács 26'	(Report)		Stadium: DVTK Stadion; Attendance: 3,000; Referee: (Hungary) Mihály Fábián

10 July 2013 3	Mezőkövesd-Zsóry SE (Hungary)	2–0	(Hungary) Vasas SC	Tata, Komárom-Esztergom County
CEST	Gévay 35'; Irhás 77'	(Report)		Stadium: Városi Sporttelep; Attendance: 150; Referee: (Hungary) Gábor Kovács

13 July 2013 4	Mezőkövesd-Zsóry SE (Hungary)	4–2	(Hungary) Dunaújváros FC	Tata, Komárom-Esztergom County
CEST	Petneházi; Olasz; Balajti; Bognár	(Report)	Ato; Urbán	Stadium: Városi Sporttelep

17 July 2013 5	Mezőkövesd-Zsóry SE (Hungary)	3–1	(Hungary) Paksi SE	Tata, Komárom-Esztergom County
CEST	Balajti 7'; Menougong 15'; Irhás 85'	(Report)	Nyári 47'	Stadium: Városi Sporttelep; Attendance: 60; Referee: (Hungary) Balázs Berke

19 July 2013 6	Mezőkövesd-Zsóry SE (Hungary)	4–1	(Hungary) Budapest Honvéd FC II	Tata, Komárom-Esztergom County
CEST	Melczer; Menougong; Hamar; Olasz	(Report)	Feketics	Stadium: Városi Sporttelep; Attendance: 50; Referee: (Hungary) Gábor Oláh
