= Csaba Hegedűs =

Csaba Hegedűs may refer to:

- Csaba Hegedűs (wrestler) (born 1948), Hungarian Greco-Roman wrestler
- Csaba Hegedűs (footballer) (born 1985), Hungarian footballer
