= Đorđe Pantić =

Serbian footballer

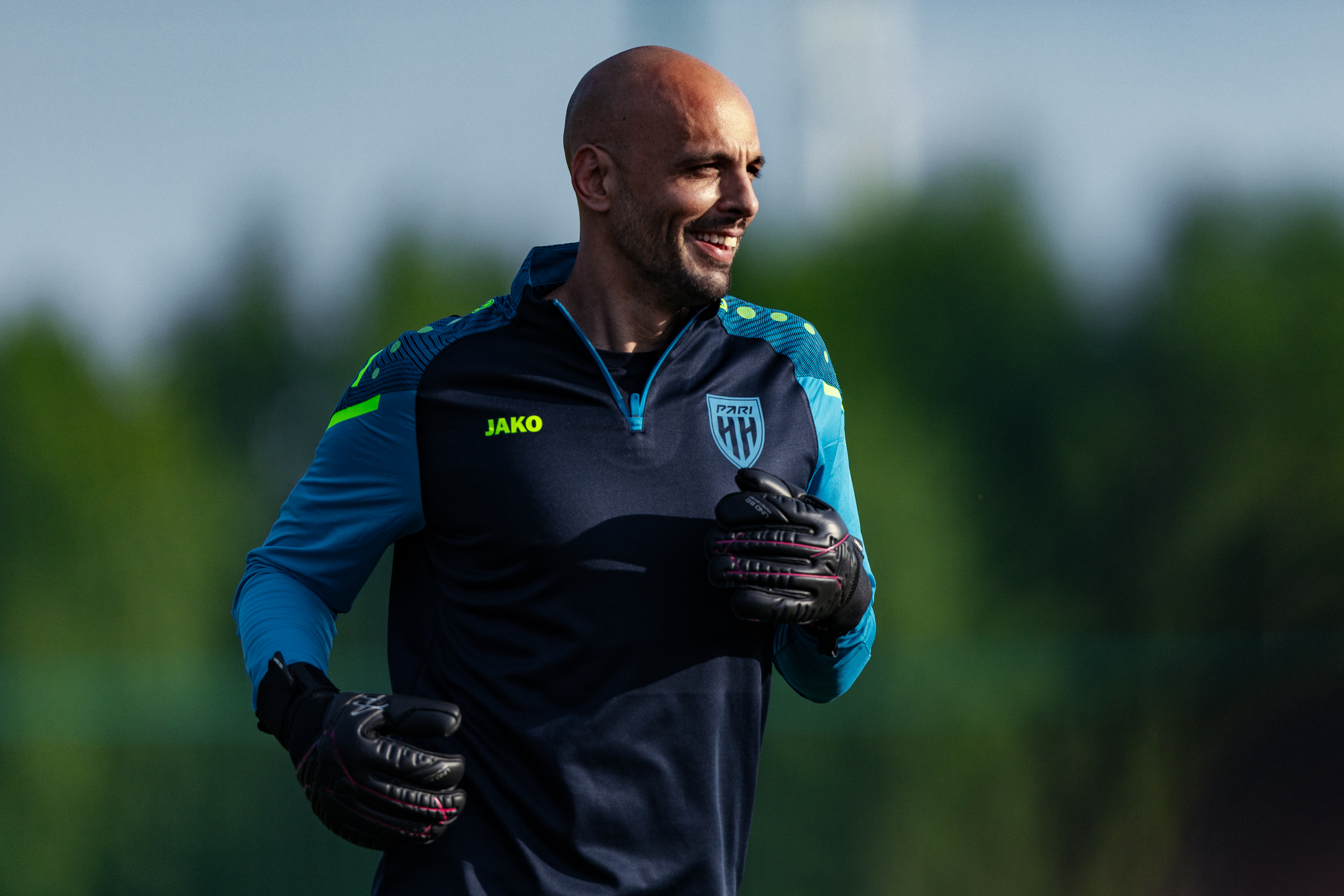
- Pantić with Nizhny Novgorod in 2024

Personal information
- Date of birth: 27 January 1980 (age 46)
- Place of birth: Belgrade, SFR Yugoslavia
- Height: 1.99 m (6 ft 6 in)
- Position: Goalkeeper

Youth career
- Radnički Beograd

Senior career*
Years	Team	Apps	(Gls)
1998–1999	Radnički Beograd	15	(0)
1999–2006	Partizan	26	(0)
2000–2002	→ Teleoptik (loan)	50	(0)
2006	→ Obilić (loan)	7	(0)
2007	TuS Koblenz	0	(0)
2008	Enköpings SK	23	(0)
2009–2010	Debrecen	7	(0)
2009–2010	Debrecen II	5	(0)
2011	Pyunik	3	(0)
2011–2012	Sarajevo	0	(0)
Total		142	(0)

Managerial career
- 2019–2020: Partizan (U19 GK coach)
- 2021–2022: Al-Fayha (GK coach)
- 2023: Partizan (GK coach)
- 2024: Pari Nizhny Novgorod (GK coach)
- * Club domestic league appearances and goals

Đorđe Pantić (Serbian Cyrillic: Ђорђе Пантић; born 27 January 1980) is a Serbian retired professional footballer who played as a goalkeeper.

== Career ==
After beginning his career at Radnički Beograd, Pantić was transferred to Partizan on 1 July 1999. He made four appearances in the 2003–04 UEFA Champions League, debuting for Partizan with a clean sheet in a goalless home draw versus Real Madrid on 4 November 2003.

In August 2011, Pantić signed a one-plus-one-year contract with Sarajevo. He made his debut for the club in a 5–4 cup loss away at Rudar Prijedor on 19 October 2011, as Sarajevo advanced to the next round. In May 2012, Pantić left the club.

In 2014, Pantić began working as a goalkeeper coach at Partizan.

== Personal life ==
In 2007, he married Serbian karateka Snežana Pantić (née Perić) with whom he has a daughter named Manja (born 2007). Snežana died of cancer in 2022.

== Honours ==
Partizan

- First League of FR Yugoslavia: 2001–02, 2002–03, 2004–05
- FR Yugoslavia Cup: 2000–01

Debrecen

- Nemzeti Bajnokság I: 2008–09, 2009–10
- Magyar Kupa: 2009–10
- Ligakupa: 2009–10
- Szuperkupa: 2009, 2010

== Coaching career ==
After retiring from professional football, Pantić graduated from the College of Professional Studies Sports Academy Belgrade and obtained the UEFA A Goalkeeper Licence. He held coaching positions at FK Partizan, Saudi club Al-Fayha, and Russian club Pari Nizhny Novgorod.
