= László Bodnár =

Hungarian footballer

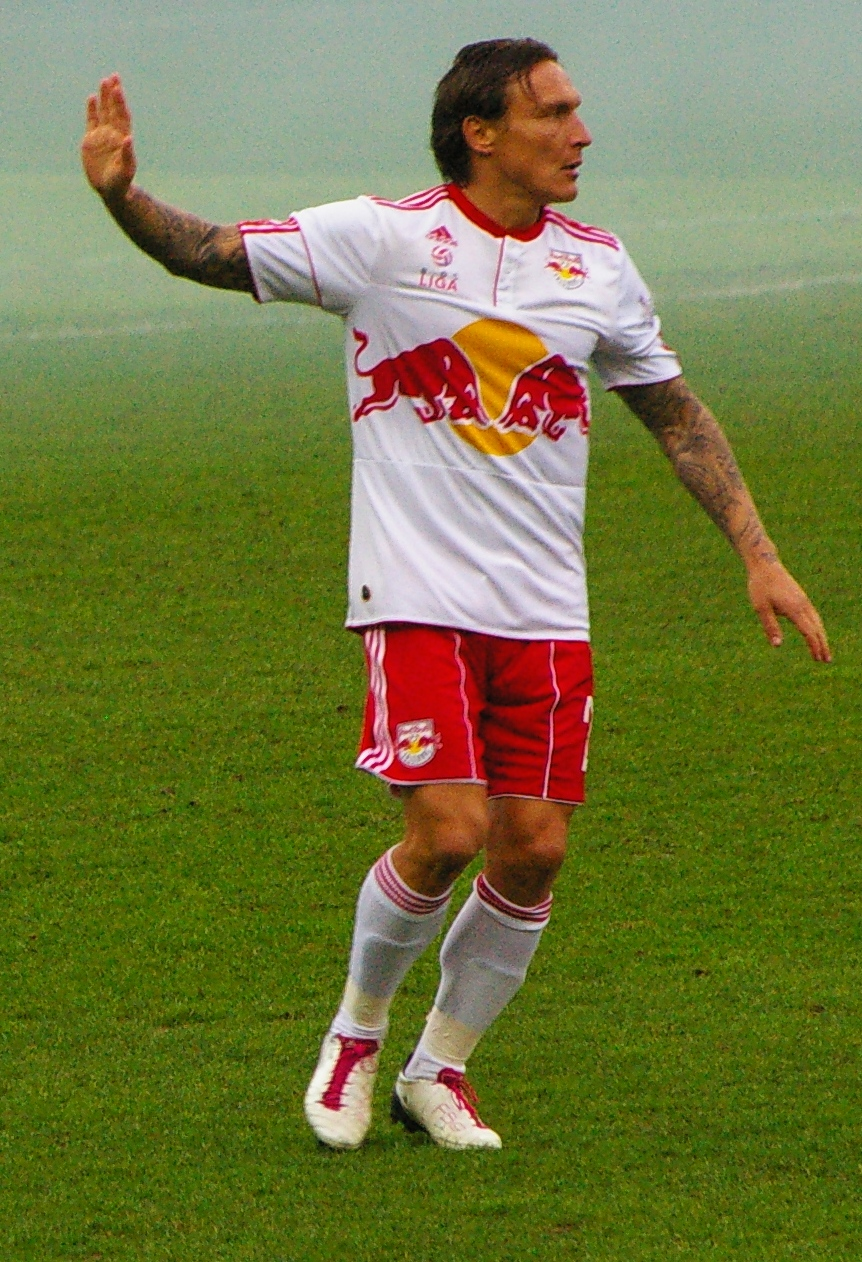
- Bodnár in 2011

Personal information
- Date of birth: 25 February 1979 (age 47)
- Place of birth: Mátészalka, Hungary
- Height: 1.74 m (5 ft 9 in)
- Position: Right back

Senior career*
Years	Team	Apps	(Gls)
1996–2000	Debreceni VSC	63	(4)
2000–2004	Dynamo Kyiv	51	(3)
2000–2003	→ Dynamo-2 Kyiv	29	(0)
2001	→ Dynamo-3 Kyiv	1	(2)
2004	→ Arsenal Kyiv (loan)	7	(0)
2004–2006	Roda JC	38	(8)
2006–2009	Red Bull Salzburg	64	(2)
2007	Red Bull Juniors	3	(0)
2009–2010	Debreceni VSC	15	(0)
2010–2011	Red Bull Salzburg	8	(0)
2012–2013	Pécsi MFC	11	(0)
2013–2014	Várda SE	3	(0)
Total		263	(17)

International career
1996–1997	Hungary U-18	7	(2)
1998–2000	Hungary U-21	9	(1)
2000–2010	Hungary	46	(0)
- * Club domestic league appearances and goals

László Bodnár (Hungarian pronunciation: [ˈlaːsloː ˈbodnaːr]; born 25 February 1979) is a Hungarian former professional footballer who played as a right back for clubs in Hungary, Ukraine, the Netherlands and Austria. He made 45 appearances for the Hungary national team.

== Personal life ==
Bodnár was born in Mátészalka. On 28 August 2009, he caused a fatal road accident which killing a cyclist. He was found guilty for speeding and was given a one-year prison sentence which was suspended for a one-year probation. He was also to pay a €1000 fine.

== Career statistics ==
=== Club ===
Appearances and goals by club, season and competition
Club	Season	League		Cup		Continental		Total	
Club	Season	Apps	Goals	Apps	Goals	Apps	Goals	Apps	Goals
Debreceni VSC	1996–97	1	0			–		1	0
Debreceni VSC	1997–98	12	0			–		12	0
Debreceni VSC	1998–99	23	1			3	0	26	1
Debreceni VSC	1999–2000	27	3			1	0	28	3
Debreceni VSC	Total	63	4			4	0	67	4
Dynamo Kyiv	2000–01	19	1			4	0	23	1
Dynamo Kyiv	2001–02	18	2			5	0	23	2
Dynamo Kyiv	2002–03	14	0			6	1	20	1
Dynamo Kyiv	Total	51	3			15	1	66	4
Arsenal Kyiv (loan)	2003–04	7	0			—	—	7	0
Roda JC	2004–05	23	6					23	6
Roda JC	2005–06	15	2			4	0	15	2
Roda JC	Total	38	8			4	0	42	8
Red Bull Salzburg	2005–06	8	0	0	0	0	0	8	0
Red Bull Salzburg	2006–07	19	0	1	0	6	0	26	0
Red Bull Salzburg	2007–08	9	0	0	0	1	0	10	0
Red Bull Salzburg	2008–09	28	2	0	0	5	0	33	2
Red Bull Salzburg	Total	64	2	1	0	12	0	77	2
Red Bull Juniors	2007–08	3	0			–		3	0
Debreceni VSC	2009–10	15	0			8	1	23	1
Red Bull Salzburg	2010–11	8	0	0	0	0	0	8	0
Pécsi MFC	2012–13	11	0	1	0	–		11	0
Várda SE	2013–14	3	0			–		3	0
Career total		263	17	2	0	43	2	308	19

=== International ===
Appearances and goals by national team and year
National team	Year	Apps	Goals
Hungary	2000	1	0
Hungary	2001	3	0
Hungary	2002	6	0
Hungary	2003	1	0
Hungary	2004	9	0
Hungary	2005	10	0
Hungary	2006	1	0
Hungary	2007	0	0
Hungary	2008	6	0
Hungary	2009	5	0
Hungary	2010	3	0
Total		45	0

== Honours ==
Dynamo Kyiv

- Premier League: 2001, 2003; runner-up: 2002
- Ukrainian Cup: 2003; runner-up: 2002
- CIS Cup: 2002

Red Bull Salzburg

- Austrian Bundesliga: 2007, 2009; runner-up: 2008

Debreceni VSC

- Hungarian National Championship I: 2009–10
- Hungarian Cup: 2009–10
- Hungarian League Cup: 2010
- Hungarian Super Cup: 2010
