= Essama Etogo =

Cameroonian footballer

Personal information
- Full name: Etogo Awoundza Essama
- Place of birth: Cameroon
- Position: Forward

Senior career*
Years	Team	Apps	(Gls)
2010–2011	Debreceni VSC	1	(0)
- * Club domestic league appearances and goals

Essama Etogo is a Cameroon football player who has played at KF Tirana in the Albanian Superliga.
