= Péter Bíró (footballer, born 1985) =

Hungarian footballer

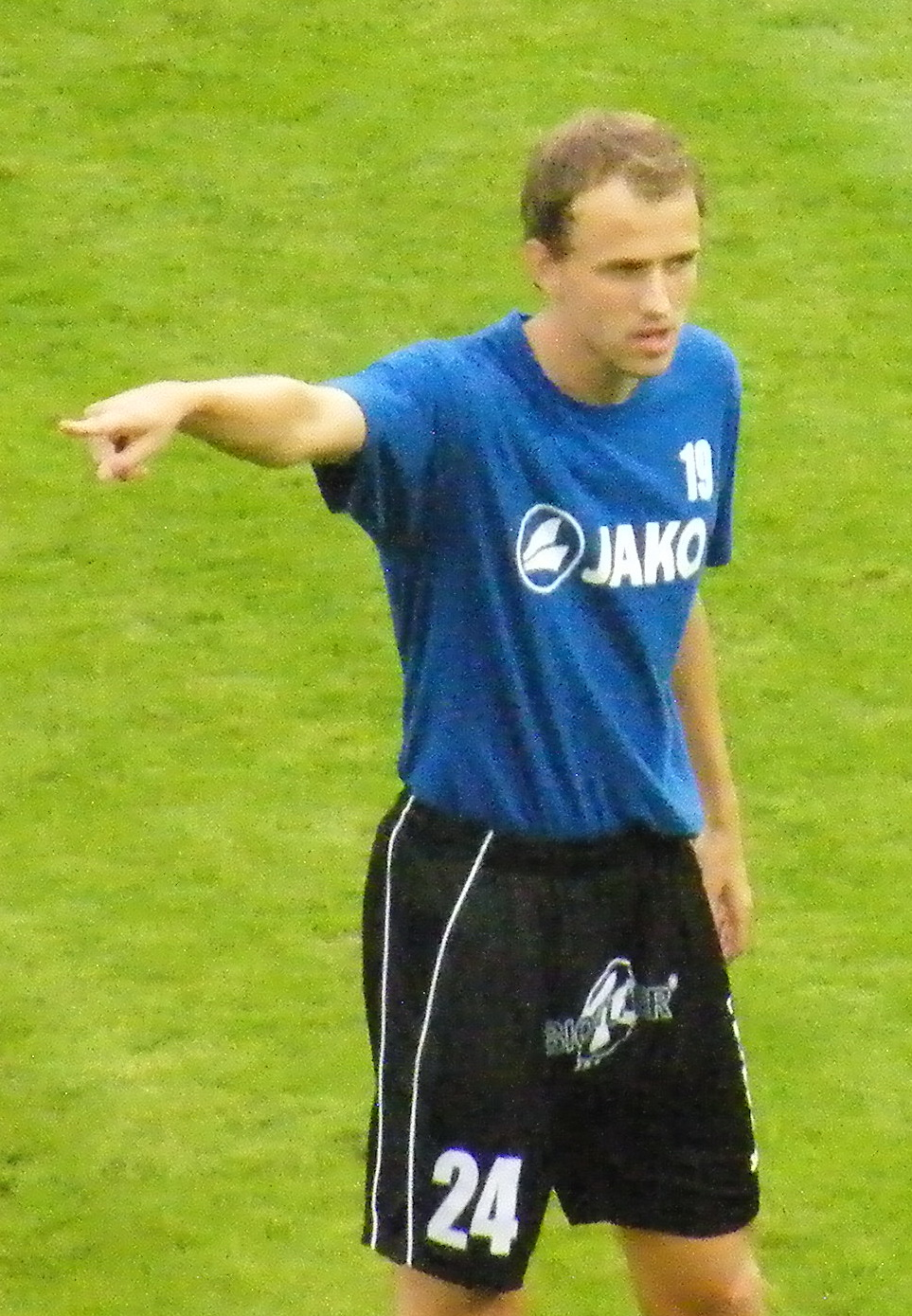

Personal information
- Date of birth: 20 September 1985 (age 41)
- Place of birth: Debrecen, Hungary
- Height: 1.90 m (6 ft 3 in)
- Position: Centre back

Team information
- Current team: Lombard-Pápa TFC
- Number: 24

Senior career*
Years	Team	Apps	(Gls)
2006–2007	Baktalórántháza VSE	14	(0)
2007–2010	Debreceni VSC	20	(2)
2010–	Lombard-Pápa TFC	8	(0)
2011–2012	→ Egri FC (loan)	14	(0)
- * Club domestic league appearances and goals as of 28 June 2012

Péter Bíró (Hungarian pronunciation: [ˈpeːtɛr ˈbiːroː]; born 20 September 1985 in Debrecen, Hungary) is a Hungarian football (defender) currently plays for Lombard-Pápa TFC.

== Honours ==
- Debreceni VSC
  - Hungarian National Championship I: 2008–09, 2009–10
    - Runner-up 2007–08
  - Hungarian Cup: 2007–08, 2009–10
  - Hungarian Super Cup: 2009, 2010
  - Hungarian League Cup: Runner-up 2008
