= Adamo Coulibaly =

French footballer (born 1981)

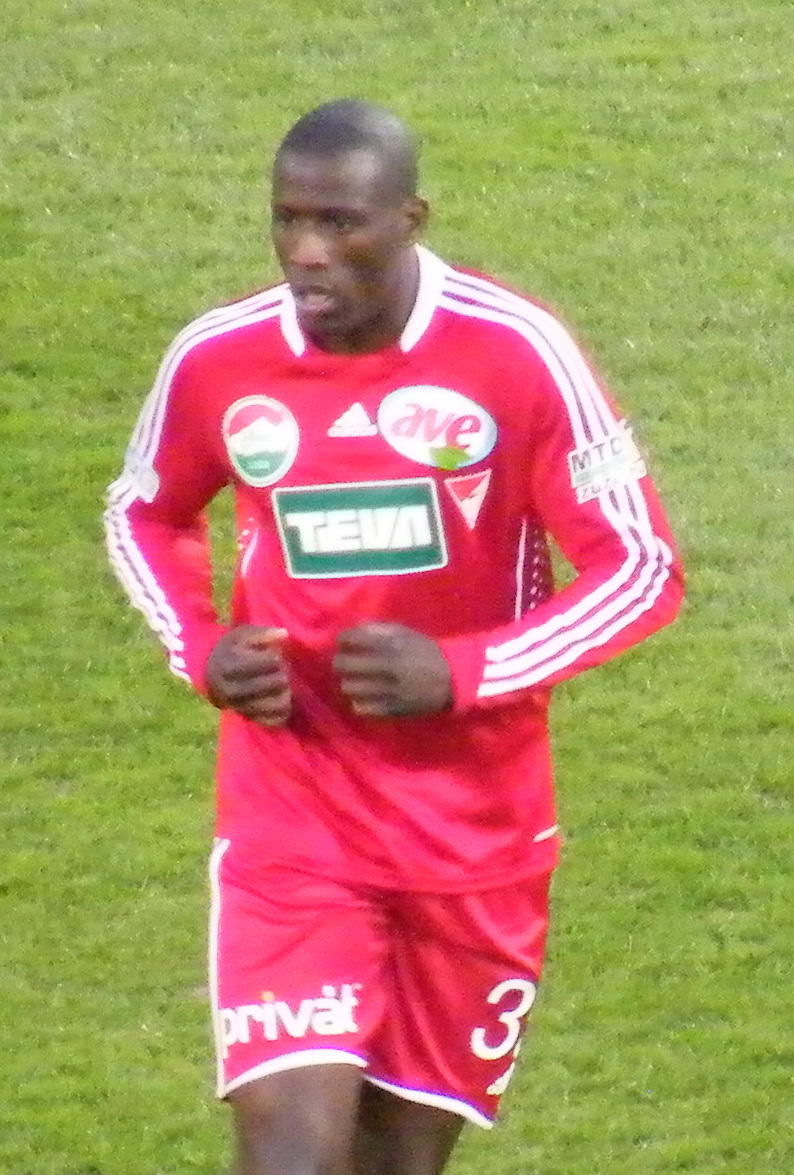
- Coulibaly in 2010

Personal information
- Full name: Adamo Coulibaly
- Date of birth: 14 August 1981 (age 45)
- Place of birth: Paris, France
- Height: 1.87 m (6 ft 2 in)
- Position: Forward

Team information
- Current team: Noisy-Le-Grand FC

Youth career
- 1991–1998: Bry-sur-Marne
- 1998–2001: Noisy-le-Grand

Senior career*
Years	Team	Apps	(Gls)
2001–2004	Perreux		
2004–2006	Neauphle-le-Chateau		
2006–2007	AS Poissy	23	(11)
2007–2008	Sint-Truiden	28	(7)
2008–2009	Royal Antwerp	31	(2)
2009–2013	Debrecen	110	(66)
2013–2015	Lens	64	(10)
2015–2016	Debrecen	7	(0)
2017	RFC Tilleur		
2019–	Noisy-Le-Grand FC	7	(0)
- * Club domestic league appearances and goals as of 20:17, 27 February 2020 (UTC)

Adamo Coulibaly (born 14 August 1981) is a French professional footballer who plays as a forward for French club Noisy-Le-Grand FC in the Championnat National 3.

== Personal life ==
Adamo Coulibaly was born in Paris. He holds French and Ivorian nationalities.

== Career ==
=== Debrecen ===
Coulibaly was signed before Debrecen's 2009–10 UEFA Champions League campaign. In the 2009–10 season, he won both the league and cup with Debrecen. The cup was secured by beating Zalaegerszegi TE 3–2 in the Hungarian Cup final in the Puskás Ferenc Stadium. He also earned the Hungarian Super Cup and Hungarian League Cup in the same season.

== Family ==
On 21.10.2013, a child was born to his wife, Barbara, Adamo Coulibaly. Currently he plays for the Debrecen Vasutas Sport Club.

Coulibaly again won the double with Debrecen in the 2011–12 season. On 1 May 2012, he won the cup by defeating MTK Budapest on penalty shoot-out. This was the fifth cup for Debrecen. On 12 May 2012, he won the league title with Debrecen after beating Pécs 4–0 in the 28th round at the Oláh Gábor utcai Stadion which resulted the sixth Hungarian League title for the Hajdús. On 26 May 2012, he scored a penalty against Szombathely, reaching his 20th goal and overtaking Nemanja Nikolić in the topscorer ranking to become the top-scorer of season.

On 23 May 2013, Coulibaly won the Hungarian League title with Debrecen after scoring both of the club's goals in a 2–1 win against Győr in the final. On 2 June 2013, he again reached the title as the top-scorer of 2012–13 season, this time with 18 goals.

=== Debrecen (return) ===
On 4 November 2015, Coulibaly signed a contract with his former club Debreceni VSC. At the end of the season, in May 2016 the club decided not use the option of renewing the contract.

=== R.F.C. Tilleur ===
After a half year without club, Coulibaly joined RFC Tilleur in January 2017.

=== Balmazújváros ===
After training with Balmazújvárosi FC for two months, Coulibaly came in shape and the club decided to offer him a contract for the rest of the season on 26 October 2017. However, two weeks later it appeared, that the papers the parties had been waiting for, wouldn't arrive. The French striker forgot to tell the team management that he had an amateur contract in Belgium, which means that under international transfer rules he could only be contracted during the transfer window. The club announced, that Coulibaly was welcome to train with the team until January where he could get registered. The club then announced in January 2018, that they were not planning to contract him anymore.

=== Noisy-Le-Grand ===
On 19 September 2019, 39-year old Coulibaly joined French club Noisy-Le-Grand FC in the Championnat National 3 together with former professional player Christian Kinkela.

== Career statistics ==
=== Club ===
As of 1 July 2013

Appearances and goals by club, season and competition
Club	Season	League			Cup		Continental		Total	
Club	Season	Division	Apps	Goals	Apps	Goals	Apps	Goals	Apps	Goals
Poissy	2006–07	Championnat	23	11			–		23	11
Sint-Truidense	2007–08	Belgian Pro League	28	7			–		28	7
Royal Antwerp	2008–09	Belgian 2nd Division	31	2			–		31	2
Debrecen	2009–10	Hungarian Pro League	30	14	8	8	10	3	48	25
Debrecen	2010–11	Hungarian Pro League	26	14	8	2	11	3	45	19
Debrecen	2011–12	Hungarian Pro League	27	20	5	2	–		32	22
Debrecen	2012–13	Hungarian Pro League	27	18	9	9	6	2	42	29
Debrecen	Total		110	66	30	21	27	8	167	95
Lens	2013–14	Ligue 2	31	6	6	2	0	0	37	8
Lens	2014–15	Ligue 1	33	4	2	1	0	0	35	5
Lens	Total		64	10	8	3	0	0	72	13
Career total			256	86	38	24	27	8	321	129

== Honours ==
=== Club ===
Debrecen

- Hungarian League: 2009–10, 2011–12
- Hungarian Cup: 2009–10, 2011–12, 2012–13
- Hungarian Super Cup: 2009, 2010
- Hungarian League Cup: 2009–10

=== Individual ===
- Top scorer of the Hungarian League: 2011–12, 2012–13
- Zilahi Prize: 2013
