= Gergő Oláh (footballer) =

Hungarian footballer

Personal information
- Date of birth: 18 February 1989 (age 37)
- Place of birth: Gyula, Hungary
- Height: 1.84 m (6 ft 0 in)
- Position: Defender

Youth career
- 2003–2007: Debrecen

Senior career*
Years	Team	Apps	(Gls)
2007–2013	Debrecen II	64	(4)
2007	→ Létavértes SC '97 (loan)	11	(0)
2010–2011	→ Békéscsaba (loan)	27	(2)
2011	→ Balmazújváros (loan)	15	(0)
2012	→ Debrecen	1	(0)
2012–2013	→ Tatabánya (loan)	24	(1)
2013–2014	Balmazújváros	22	(0)
2014–2016	Szeged-Csanád	49	(2)
2016–2018	Kisvárda	41	(9)
2018–2021	Szeged-Csanád	87	(7)
- * Club domestic league appearances and goals as of 16 May 2021

Gergő Oláh (born 18 February 1989) is a Hungarian football defender. He made his professional debut in the 2012–13 Nemzeti Bajnokság I against Kaposvári Rákóczi FC. He has two children, Zalán and Anna.
