= Károly Czanik =

Slovak footballer

Personal information
- Full name: Károly Czanik
- Date of birth: 13 September 1984 (age 42)
- Place of birth: Komárno, Czechoslovakia
- Height: 1.78 m (5 ft 10 in)
- Position: Midfielder

Team information
- Current team: Gyirmót SE
- Number: 69

Senior career*
Years	Team	Apps	(Gls)
2005–2007	Győri ETO FC	17	(0)
2006	→ Integrál-DAC (on loan)	6	(0)
2007–2008	Integrál-DAC	27	(6)
2008–2010	Debreceni VSC	1	(0)
2009–2010	→ Nyíregyháza Spartacus (on loan)	5	(0)
2010–2011	→ Szolnoki MÁV FC (on loan)	0	(0)
2011–	Gyirmót SE	40	(2)
- * Club domestic league appearances and goals as of 28 February 2010

Károly Czanik (born 13 September 1984) is a Slovak football midfielder of Hungarian ethnicity who currently plays for Gyirmót SE.
