= Stanislav Velický =

Slovak footballer

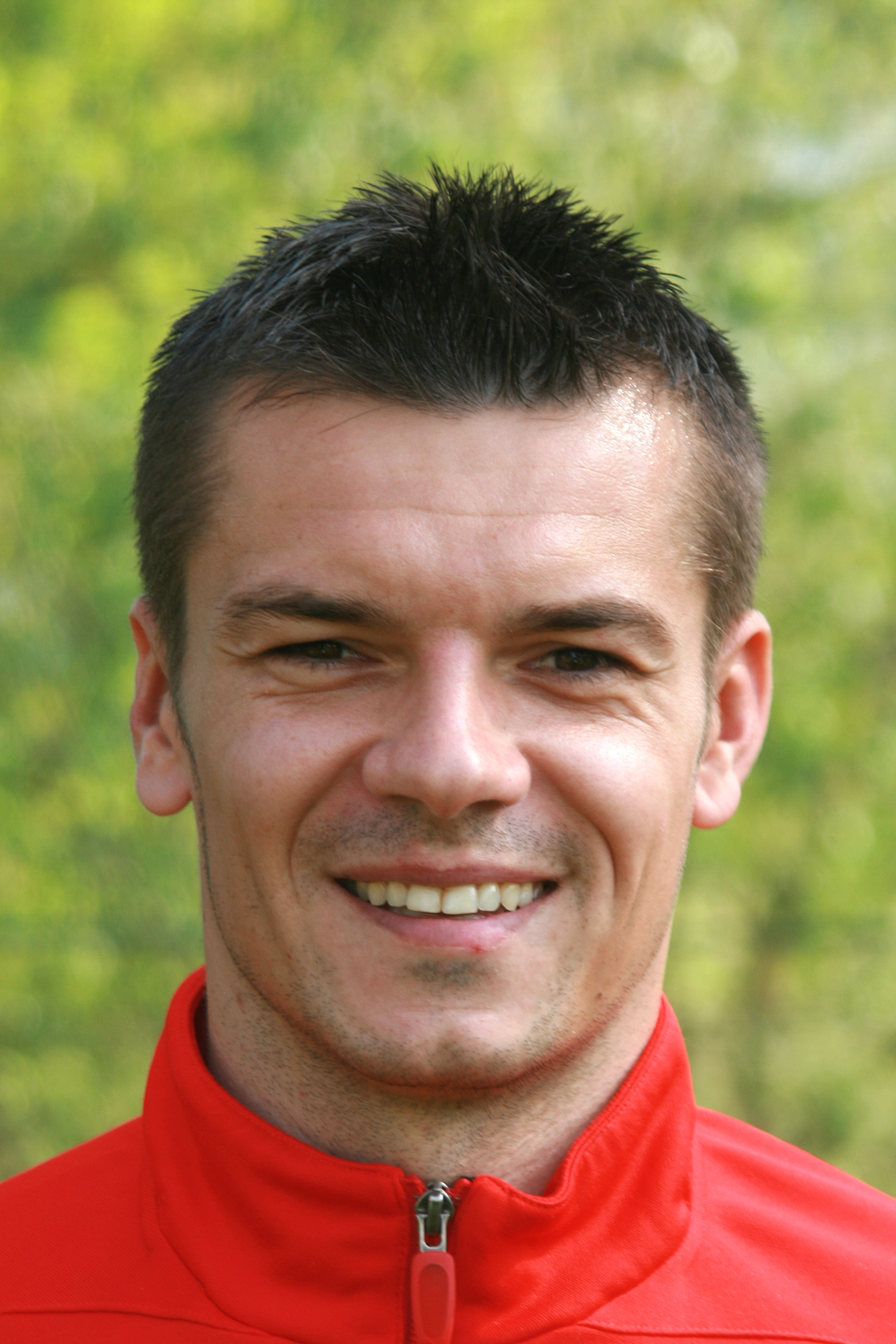
- Velický in 2009

Personal information
- Date of birth: 16 April 1981 (age 45)
- Place of birth: Lakšárska Nová Ves, Czechoslovakia
- Height: 1.87 m (6 ft 1 1/2 in)
- Position: Midfielder

Team information
- Current team: Sokol Tvrdonice

Youth career
- Lakšárska Nová Ves

Senior career*
Years	Team	Apps	(Gls)
2000–2002	Senica	28	(6)
2002–2003	Vranov nad Topľou	2	(0)
2003–2006	Trenčín	80	(11)
2006–2009	Banská Bystrica	42	(1)
2008	→ Artmedia Petržalka (loan)	13	(0)
2009	Mattersburg	11	(0)
2009–2010	Senica	16	(4)
2010	Odra Wodzisław	12	(0)
2010–2011	AE Paphos	7	(0)
2011	Dolný Kubín	12	(2)
2011–2012	Jihlava	25	(2)
2012–2013	Dunajská Streda	35	(9)
2013–2014	Mezőkövesd	12	(0)
2014–2015	ŠKF Sereď	9	(0)
2015	Gabčíkovo	14	(4)
2015	SC Schaubach Pyhra	13	(0)
2016	Sokol Lanžhot	31	(2)
2017	USV Hauskirchen		
2017–2018	Sokol Lanžhot		
2018–2019	Lakšárska Nová Ves		
2019–	Sokol Tvrdonice		

International career
2001	Slovakia U21	3	(0)
- * Club domestic league appearances and goals as of 16 April 2024

Stanislav Velický (born 16 April 1981) is a Slovak footballer who plays as a midfielder for Sokol Tvrdonice. He previously played for FC Vysočina Jihlava and MFK Dolný Kubín.
