= Vilmos Szalai =

Hungarian footballer

Personal information
- Full name: Vilmos Szalai
- Date of birth: 11 August 1991 (age 35)
- Place of birth: Budapest, Hungary
- Height: 1.90 m (6 ft 3 in)
- Position: Centre-back

Team information
- Current team: III. Kerület
- Number: 22

Youth career
- 2002–2006: Ferencváros
- 2006–2010: Újpest

Senior career*
Years	Team	Apps	(Gls)
2010–2012	Újpest	1	(0)
2010–2012	→ Újpest II	29	(3)
2012	Wormatia Worms	1	(0)
2012–2016	Mezőkövesd	46	(3)
2014–2015	→ Diósgyőr (loan)	13	(0)
2015	→ Sopron (loan)	10	(0)
2016	Nyíregyháza	11	(1)
2016–2017	Siófok	20	(0)
2017–2018	Vecsés	28	(0)
2018–	III. Kerület	84	(8)
- * Club domestic league appearances and goals as of 19:38, 3 February 2022 (UTC)

Vilmos Szalai (born 11 August 1991) is a Hungarian football player who plays for III. Kerületi TVE in the Nemzeti Bajnokság II. He played his first league match in 2010.

== Club statistics ==
As of 21 September 2019

Appearances and goals by club, season and competition
Club	Season	League			Cup		League Cup		Europe		Total	
Club	Season	Division	Apps	Goals	Apps	Goals	Apps	Goals	Apps	Goals	Apps	Goals
Újpest
Újpest	2010–11	Nemzeti Bajnokság I	1	0	1	0	3	0	0	0	5	0
Újpest	2011–12	Nemzeti Bajnokság I	0	0	0	0	3	0	0	0	3	0
Újpest	Total		1	0	1	0	6	0	0	0	8	0
Mezőkövesd
Mezőkövesd	2012–13	Nemzeti Bajnokság II	20	1	1	0	0	0	0	0	21	1
Mezőkövesd	2013–14	Nemzeti Bajnokság I	26	2	3	0	7	0	0	0	36	2
Mezőkövesd	Total		46	3	4	0	7	0	0	0	57	3
Diósgyőr	2014–15	Nemzeti Bajnokság I	13	0	2	0	6	0	0	0	21	0
Sopron	2015–16	Nemzeti Bajnokság II	10	0	1	1	—		—		11	1
Nyíregyháza	2015–16	Nemzeti Bajnokság III	11	1	2	0	—		—		13	1
Siófok	2016–17	Nemzeti Bajnokság II	20	0	0	0	—		—		20	0
Vecsés	2017–18	Nemzeti Bajnokság III	28	0	3	0	—		—		31	0
III. Kerület
III. Kerület	2018–19	Nemzeti Bajnokság III	24	4	3	0	—		—		27	4
III. Kerület	2019–20	Nemzeti Bajnokság III	7	1	1	0	—		—		8	1
III. Kerület	Total		31	5	4	0	—		—		35	5
Career total			160	9	17	1	19	0	0	0	196	10

== Honours ==
Mezőkövesd

- NB II Kelet (1): 2012–13
