= Zoltan Silvashi =

Ukrainian footballer

Personal information
- Full name: Zoltan Zoltanovych Silvashi
- Date of birth: 20 June 1993 (age 33)
- Place of birth: Velyka Dobron, Zakarpattia Oblast, Ukraine
- Height: 1.78 m (5 ft 10 in)
- Position: Centre back

Team information
- Current team: TSV Dasing
- Number: 13

Youth career
- 2006–2008: Youth Sportive School Uzhhorod

Senior career*
Years	Team	Apps	(Gls)
2011–2012	FC Dnipro Dnipropetrovsk	0	(0)
2012–2013	SC Tavriya Simferopol	0	(0)
2014	Mezőkövesd-Zsóry SE	1	(0)
2014–2015	BFC Siófok	2	(0)
2015	Kisvárda	12	(1)
2015–2016	MŠK Rimavská Sobota	6	(0)
2016–2018	Szentlőrinc SE	20	(2)
2018	Türkspor Augsburg	?	(?)
2018–2022	TSV Pöttmes	?	(?)
2022–	TSV Dasing	?	(?)
- * Club domestic league appearances and goals as of 10 October 2023

Zoltan Silvashi (Ukrainian: Золтан Золтанович Сільваші; Hungarian: Zoltán Szilvási; or Zoltán Szilvási; born 20 June 1993) is a Ukrainian football defender who plays for german team TSV Dasing.

Silvashi spent some years in the Sportive Youth system in Uzhhorod. Then he played in the Ukrainian Premier League Reserves for FC Dnipro and SC Tavriya. From January 2014 he is playing for different Hungarian teams.
