= Norbert Feketics =

Romanian professional footballer

Personal information
- Full name: Norbert Sandor Feketics
- Date of birth: 13 June 1996 (age 30)
- Place of birth: Târgu Mureș, Romania
- Height: 1.77 m (5 ft 10 in)
- Position: Midfielder

Youth career
- 2008–2014: Târgu Mureș
- 2014–2015: Budapest Honvéd

Senior career*
Years	Team	Apps	(Gls)
2015–2016	Târgu Mureș	4	(0)
2015–2016	→ Târgu Mureș II	?	(?)
2017–2019	Avântul Reghin	?	(?)
- * Club domestic league appearances and goals as of 6 March 2019

Norbert Feketics (born 13 June 1996) is a Romanian professional footballer who plays as a midfielder.
