= Dénes Olasz =

Hungarian footballer

Personal information
- Full name: Dénes Olasz
- Date of birth: 16 December 1988 (age 37)
- Place of birth: Mezőkövesd, Hungary
- Height: 1.89 m (6 ft 2 in)
- Position: Forward

Team information
- Current team: Eger SE
- Number: 21

Youth career
- 2003–2007: Mezőkövesd
- 2004–2006: → Kazincbarcika (loan)

Senior career*
Years	Team	Apps	(Gls)
2006–2009	Mezőkövesd	12	(0)
2006–2007	→ Kazincbarcika (loan)	19	(4)
2009–2011	Videoton II	44	(9)
2011–2014	Mezőkövesd	37	(5)
2012–2013	→ Putnok (loan)	12	(4)
2012–2013	→ Lombard Pápa (loan)		
2015	Kaposvári	7	(0)
2015–2016	Ajka	7	(3)
2016	Salgótarjáni		
2016–2018	Szolnoki MÁV	58	(16)
2018–2019	Kazincbarcikai	15	(4)
2019	Ceglédi	10	(1)
2019–2020	Békéscsaba	5	(0)
2020–	Eger SE	21	(4)
- * Club domestic league appearances and goals as of 21:45, 16 October 2019 (UTC)

Dénes Olasz (born 16 December 1988) is a Hungarian professional footballer who plays for Eger SE.
