= Tamás Sárközi =

Hungarian footballer (born 1994)

Personal information
- Full name: Tamás Sárközi
- Date of birth: 2 April 1994 (age 32)
- Place of birth: Salgótarján, Hungary
- Position: Forward

Team information
- Current team: Nagybátony
- Number: 23

Youth career
- 2011–2012: Kecskemét
- 2012–2013: Salgótarján

Senior career*
Years	Team	Apps	(Gls)
2013–2014	Nagybátony	23	(3)
2014	Mezőkövesd	4	(0)
2014-2015	Kazincbarcika	31	(8)
2015-2016	Somos	9	(0)
2016-2023	Salgótarján	169	(41)
204	Hofkirchen	0	(0)
2024-	Nagybátony	9	(0)
- * Club domestic league appearances and goals as of 19 December 2022

Tamás "Veso" Sárközi (born 2 April 1994) is a Hungarian footballer who currently plays for Bátonyterenye.

== Career statistics ==
Appearances and goals by club, season and competition
Club	Season	League		Cup		League Cup		Europe		Total	
Club	Season	Apps	Goals	Apps	Goals	Apps	Goals	Apps	Goals	Apps	Goals
Nagybátony
Nagybátony	2012–13	23	3	3	0	0	0	0	0	26	3
Nagybátony	Total	23	3	3	0	0	0	0	0	26	0
Mezőkövesd
Mezőkövesd	2013–14	1	0	0	0	0	0	0	0	1	0
Mezőkövesd	Total	1	0	1	0	0	0	0	0	1	0
Career total		24	3	3	0	0	0	0	0	27	3

Updated to games played as of 4 May 2014.
