= Csaba Bogdány =

Hungarian footballer

Personal information
- Date of birth: 15 May 1981 (age 45)
- Place of birth: Balassagyarmat, Hungary
- Height: 1.64 m (5 ft 4 1/2 in)
- Position: Midfielder

Youth career
- 2002–2006: Érsekvadkert
- 2006: Berkenye

Senior career*
Years	Team	Apps	(Gls)
2006–2007	Karcag	26	(6)
2007–2014	Mezőkövesd	163	(48)
2014	→ Felsőtárkány (loan)	12	(12)
2014–2015	Szécsény		
- * Club domestic league appearances and goals

Csaba Bogdány (born 15 May 1981) is a Hungarian former football player.

== Career statistics ==
As of 8 December 2013

Appearances and goals by club, season and competition
Club	Season	League			Cup		League Cup		Europe		Total	
Club	Season	Division	Apps	Goals	Apps	Goals	Apps	Goals	Apps	Goals	Apps	Goals
Karcag	2006–07	Nemzeti Bajnokság II	26	6	1	0	0	0	0	0	27	6
Mezőkövesd
Mezőkövesd	2007–08	Nemzeti Bajnokság II	27	6	0	0	0	0	0	0	27	6
Mezőkövesd	2008–09	Nemzeti Bajnokság III	26	13	2	0	0	0	0	0	28	13
Mezőkövesd	2009–10	Nemzeti Bajnokság II	27	11	5	7	0	0	0	0	32	18
Mezőkövesd	2010–11	Nemzeti Bajnokság II	27	6	2	2	0	0	0	0	29	8
Mezőkövesd	2011–12	Nemzeti Bajnokság II	28	10	2	3	2	0	0	0	32	13
Mezőkövesd	2012–13	Nemzeti Bajnokság II	23	2	2	0	0	0	0	0	25	2
Mezőkövesd	2013–14	Nemzeti Bajnokság I	5	0	1	1	3	0	0	0	9	1
Mezőkövesd	Total		163	48	14	13	5	0	0	0	182	61
Career total			189	54	15	13	5	0	0	0	209	67

== Honours ==
Mezőkövesd

- NB II Kelet (1): 2012–13
