= Szilárd Éles =

Hungarian footballer (born 1987)

Personal information
- Full name: Szilárd Éles
- Date of birth: 1 October 1987 (age 39)
- Place of birth: Berettyóújfalu, Hungary
- Height: 1.79 m (5 ft 10 in)
- Position: Defender

Team information
- Current team: Mezőkövesd
- Number: 21

Youth career
- 1999–2001: Biharkeresztes
- 2001–2005: Debrecen

Senior career*
Years	Team	Apps	(Gls)
2005–2011	Debrecen	0	(0)
2005–2006	→ Létavértes (loan)	?	(?)
2007–2009	→ Debrecen II	48	(2)
2009	→ Nyíregyháza (loan)	4	(0)
2009–2010	→ Debrecen II (loan)	31	(3)
2010–2011	→ Mezőkövesd (loan)	29	(0)
2011–2012	Siófok	0	(0)
2012–	Mezőkövesd	31	(1)
- * Club domestic league appearances and goals as of 6 October 2013

Szilárd Éles (born 1 October 1987 in Berettyóújfalu) is a Hungarian football player who currently plays for BFC Siófok on loan from Mezőkövesd-Zsóry SE.
