= Csaba Hegedűs (footballer) =

Hungarian footballer

Personal information
- Full name: Csaba Hegedűs
- Date of birth: 26 October 1985 (age 41)
- Place of birth: Pásztó, Hungary
- Height: 1.78 m (5 ft 10 in)
- Position: Full back

Team information
- Current team: Taksony

Youth career
- 2002–2005: MTK

Senior career*
Years	Team	Apps	(Gls)
2005–2008	Soroksár	48	(2)
2008–2012	Vác	101	(11)
2012–2015	Mezőkövesd	67	(3)
2015–2019	Vác	118	(5)
2019–	Taksony		
- * Club domestic league appearances and goals as of 23:30, 14 November 2019 (UTC)

Csaba Hegedűs (born 26 October 1985 in Pásztó) is a Hungarian football player. He plays for Taksony SE. He played his first league match in 2013.

== Honours ==
Mezőkövesd

- NB II Kelet (1): 2012–13
