= 2009–10 Nemzeti Bajnokság I =

108th season of top-tier football in Hungary

Nemzeti Bajnokság I
- Season: 2009–10
- Dates: 24 July 2009 – 23 May 2010
- Champions: Debrecen
- Relegated: Nyíregyháza; Diósgyőr
- Champions League: Debrecen
- Europa League: Videoton; Győr; Zalaegerszeg
- Matches: 240
- Goals: 706 (2.94 per match)
- Top goalscorer: Nemanja Nikolic (18)
- Biggest home win: Kecskemét 5–1 Vasas; Nyíregyháza 5–1 Vasas; MTK 4–0 Kaposvár; Debrecen 5–1 Kaposvár
- Biggest away win: Nyíregyháza 0–4 Zalaegerszeg
- Highest scoring: Kecskemét 3–6 Fehérvár; MTK 4–5 Újpest
- Longest winning run: Debrecen (8 games)
- Longest unbeaten run: Videoton (19 games)
- Longest winless run: Nyíregyháza (12 games)
- Longest losing run: Diósgyőr, Kaposvár (6 games each)

The 2009–10 Nemzeti Bajnokság I, also known as NB I, was the 108th season of top-tier football in Hungary. The league was officially named Soproni Liga for sponsorship reasons. The season began on 24 July 2009 and ended on 23 May 2010. Debrecen were the defending champions, and they defended their title.

== Promotion and relegation from 2008–09 ==
Siófok and Rákospalota finished the season in the last two places and thus were relegated to their respective NB II divisions. Siófok ended a two-year stint in Hungary's highest football league while Rákospalota were relegated after four years.

Promotion to the league was achieved by the champions of the NB II Eastern Division, Ferencváros and by the runners-up of the Western Division, Pápa. Both teams return to the National Division after three-year absences. Pápa capitalized on the denial of a NB I license for Western Division champions Gyirmót SE.

== Overview ==
Debrecen won their fifth title in six years, and their third under András Herczeg. The club started off the season by losing their first league game since March, after a 1-0 defeat at Diósgyőr. DVSC then went on an 8-game winning streak, but lost three consecutive games in October including a 3-0 defeat to title-contenders Videoton, and were placed second, 2 points off of Videoton by half-time. The club from Fehérvár only suffered two losses throughout the autumn part of the campaign, and went on an 18-game unbeaten run in the league.

MTK ended Videoton's unbeaten streak in May, defeating them 1-0 in Fehérvár. The following week Debrecen defeated Videoton 3-2, and were 6 points clear off of their western counterparts, with three games to go. Some hope was restored in Vidi's title-aspirations, as DVSC suffered a 2-1 loss at Újpest in Gameweek 28, while Videoton shut out Vasas 3-0. Going into the last gameday, the teams were just separated by just one point. Videoton lost in their arch-rivals' home, as Győri ETO beat them 1-0, meaning that despite DVSC's defeat at Kecskemét of the same scoreline, the railway team successfully defended their championship.

=== Stadia and locations ===
Location of teams in Hungarian National Championship I 2009–10

Club	City	Stadium	Capacity
Honvéd	Budapest	Bozsik József Stadion	10,000
Debrecen	Debrecen	Stadion Oláh Gábor Út	9,640
Diósgyőr	Miskolc	DVTK Stadion	11,000
Ferencváros	Budapest	Stadion Albert Flórián	18,100
Győr	Győr	ETO Park	16,000
Kaposvár	Kaposvár	Stadion Rákóczi	7,000
Kecskemét	Kecskemét	Széktói Stadion	6,300
Pápa	Pápa	Stadion Várkerti	4,500
MTK	Budapest	Hidegkuti Nándor Stadium	7,700
Nyíregyháza	Nyíregyháza	Városi Stadion	10,000
Paks	Paks	Stadion PSE	4,950
Haladás	Szombathely	Stadion Rohonci Út	12,000
Újpest	Budapest	Szusza Ferenc Stadium	13,501
Vasas	Budapest	Stadion Rudolf Illovszky	12,000
Videoton	Székesfehérvár	Stadion Sóstói	15,000
Zalaegerszeg	Zalaegerszeg	ZTE Arena	9,000

=== Personnel and sponsoring ===
Team	Chairman	Head Coach	Kitmaker	Shirt sponsor
Honvéd	(United States) George F. Hemingway	(Hungary) Tibor Sisa	Nike	
Debrecen	(Hungary) Sándor Szilágyi	(Hungary) András Herczeg	adidas	Teva
Diósgyőr	(Hungary) Imre Dlusztus	(Hungary) Zoltán Aczél	Erreà	Jánosik és TSA.
Videoton	(Hungary) Sándor Berzi	(Hungary) György Mezey	Nike	Máltai Szeretetszolgálat
Ferencváros	(England) Terry Robinson	(England) Bobby Davison	Nike	Unibet
Győr	(Hungary) Csaba Tarsoly	(Hungary) Attila Pintér	adidas	Quaestor
Kaposvár	(Hungary) Kálmán Torma	(Hungary) László Prukner	Givova	Regáli Klíma
Kecskemét	(Hungary) Pál Rózsa, János Versegi	(Hungary) Aurél Csertői	Jako	Ereco
Pápa	(Hungary) Péter Bíró	(Hungary) György Véber	Jako	Lombard
MTK	(Hungary) László Domonyai	(Hungary) József Garami	Nike	fotex
Nyíregyháza	(Hungary) Ferenc Karakó	(Hungary) Lázár Szentes	Jako	
Paks	(Hungary) János Süli	(Hungary) Imre Gellei	Jako	MvM Paksi Atomerőmű
Haladás	(Hungary) Béla Illés	(Hungary) Antal Róth	Legea	Contact Zrt.
Újpest	(Hungary) István Csehi	(Scotland) Willie McStay	Puma	Birdland Golf & SPA Resort
Vasas	(Hungary) János Jámbor	(Hungary) Géza Mészöly	Lancast	
Zalaegerszeg	(Hungary) Ferenc Nagy	(Hungary) János Csank	mass	

=== Managerial changes ===
Team	Outgoing manager	Manner of departure	Date of vacancy	Replaced by	Date of appointment
Honvéd	Tibor Sisa		23 October 2009		
Ferencváros	Bobby Davison	Sacked	30 October 2009	Craig Short	30 November 2009

== League table ==
Pos	Team	Pld	W	D	L	GF	GA	GD	Pts	Qualification or relegation
1	Debrecen (C)	30	20	2	8	63	37	+26	62	Qualification for Champions League second qualifying round
2	Videoton	30	18	7	5	59	31	+28	61	Qualification for Europa League second qualifying round
3	Győr	30	15	12	3	38	18	+20	57	Qualification for Europa League first qualifying round
4	Újpest	30	17	4	9	49	39	+10	55	
5	Zalaegerszeg	30	15	8	7	59	45	+14	53	Qualification for Europa League first qualifying round (Note: Since the winners of the 2009–10 Magyar Kupa, Debrecen, qualified for the Champions League, the spot given to the Magyar Kupa winners (Europa League first qualifying round) was passed to the losing finalists.)
6	MTK	30	12	7	11	52	41	+11	43	
7	Ferencváros	30	10	11	9	34	35	−1	41	
8	Haladás	30	10	9	11	46	49	−3	39	
9	Honvéd	30	9	11	10	38	35	+3	38	
10	Kecskemét	30	10	7	13	50	56	−6	37	
11	Pápa	30	10	5	15	39	50	−11	35	
12	Kaposvár	30	8	8	14	38	50	−12	32	
13	Vasas	30	8	7	15	39	61	−22	31	
14	Paks	30	7	10	13	31	44	−13	31	
15	Nyíregyháza (R)	30	6	9	15	41	60	−19	27	Relegation to Nemzeti Bajnokság II
16	Diósgyőr (R)	30	4	5	21	31	56	−25	17	Relegation to Nemzeti Bajnokság II

Source: soccerway.com
Rules for classification: 1st points; 2nd overall wins; 3rd goal difference; 4th goals scored
(C) Champions; (R) Relegated

== Results ==
Home \ Away	DEB	DIO	FTC	GYO	HAL	HON	KAP	KEC	MTK	NYI	PAK	PAP	UTE	VAS	VID	ZTE
Debrecen		3–1	2–1	0–0	2–1	2–1	5–1	1–0	2–0	3–1	3–1	2–0	1–2	3–0	3–2	5–3
Diósgyőr	1–0		0–1	0–1	1–3	1–2	1–3	4–1	2–5	0–1	0–0	3–0	1–2	0–1	0–1	1–1
Ferencváros	1–0	0–3 (Note: The match was abandoned in the 70th minute with Diósgyőr leading 3–1 due to a pitch invasion by drunk and drug-affected Ferencváros fans. The match was awarded to Diósgyőr with 3–0.)		1–0	2–1	0–0	0–0	3–2	2–1	0–0	1–1	2–0	0–1	1–1	2–2	4–1
Győr	1–0	3–1	2–1		1–1	2–0	1–1	1–0	2–0	2–1	3–1	1–1	0–0	1–1	1–0	1–1
Haladás	0–2	2–1	0–0	1–2		2–2	2–1	3–3	2–4	2–0	4–0	4–2	1–0	0–1	4–3	1–1
Honvéd	1–2	4–2	2–0	0–0	0–0		3–1	0–1	4–1	1–1	1–1	1–3	1–1	3–3	0–0	0–1
Kaposvár	4–4	2–2	0–0	1–3	3–0	1–0		2–1	1–2	1–1	1–1	3–1	2–0	1–0	1–3	1–1
Kecskemét	1–0	1–1	3–1	2–0	2–3	2–2	3–1		2–5	2–2	1–1	2–2	2–1	5–1	3–6	2–2
MTK	2–3	4–0	1–1	0–0	0–0	2–1	4–0	0–1		4–0	1–1	0–0	4–5	2–3	2–2	1–0
Nyíregyháza	0–3	1–1	3–1	1–3	3–3	0–1	2–1	2–3	1–1		1–1	3–1	2–2	5–1	2–3	0–4
Paks	0–1	1–0	1–2	1–1	2–0	2–1	2–0	2–1	0–2	1–0		2–2	1–0	2–2	1–2	1–2
Pápa	1–5	2–1	0–1	1–0	1–3	0–3	3–1	2–0	0–1	5–1	1–0		1–0	4–1	0–1	1–2
Újpest	2–1	4–1	2–1	0–3	3–1	0–1	2–1	3–1	3–2	3–1	3–2	0–3		1–0	0–1	2–1
Vasas	2–4	1–0	3–2	0–2	0–0	2–2	1–0	0–1	2–0	2–3	3–1	2–2	1–2		2–4	2–3
Videoton	3–0	3–2	0–0	0–0	4–2	2–0	2–0	2–0	0–1	1–0	3–0	2–0	1–1	3–0		1–2
Zalaegerszeg	4–1	3–0	3–3	1–1	3–0	0–1	0–3	3–2	1–0	4–3	2–1	3–0	1–4	4–1	2–2	

Source: soccerway.com
Legend: Blue = home team win; Yellow = draw; Red = away team win.

== Top goalscorers ==
Including matches played on 18 May 2010; Source: MLSZ (Click on "Góllövő lista")

Rank	Scorer	Club	Goals
1	(Serbia) Nemanja Nikolić	Kaposvár / Videoton	18
2	(Brazil) Andre Alves	Videoton	15
3	(Hungary) Péter Kabát	Újpest	14
3	(Latvia) Artjoms Rudņevs	Zalaegerszeg	14
3	(France) Adamo Coulibaly	Debrecen	14
6	(Hungary) János Lázok	Vasas	13
7	(Hungary) Tibor Montvai	Kecskemét	12
7	(Estonia) Tarmo Kink	Győr	12
9	(Hungary) Attila Tököli	Paks	11
10	(Algeria) Fouad Bouguerra	Nyíregyháza	10
10	(Hungary) Péter Czvitkovics	Debrecen	10

== Attendances ==
#	Club	Average attendance
1	Ferencváros	5,323
2	Debrecen	4,747
3	Újpest	4,365
4	Szombathelyi Haladás	4,267
5	Zalaegerszeg	3,824
6	Videoton	3,592
7	Kecskemét	3,180
8	Nyíregyháza Spartacus	3,100
9	Lombard Pápa	2,733
10	Diósgyőr	2,718
11	Győr	2,647
12	Kaposvár	2,083
13	Paks	1,873
14	Budapest Honvéd	1,343
15	Vasas	1,317
16	MTK	1,007
