= 2012–13 Budapest Honvéd FC season =

Budapest Honvéd FC
2012–13 season
- Chairman: George Hemingway
- Manager: Marco Rossi
- NB 1: 3.
- UEFA Europa League: Second qualifying round
- Hungarian Cup: Quarter-final
- Hungarian League Cup: Quarter-final
- Top goalscorer: League: Gergely Délczeg (10); All: Richárd Vernes (14)
- Highest home attendance: 5,100 v Anzhi Makhachkala (26 July 2012)
- Lowest home attendance: 100 v Gyirmót (13 November 2012)
Home colours	Away colours

The 2012–13 season was Budapest Honvéd FC's 102nd competitive season, 8th consecutive season in the OTP Bank Liga and 103rd year in existence as a football club.

== First team squad ==
Note: Flags indicate national team as defined under FIFA eligibility rules; some limited exceptions apply. Players may hold more than one non-FIFA nationality.

No.	Pos.	Nation	Player
2	DF	ROU	Sergiu Moga
3	DF	SEN	Souleymane Tandia
4	DF	SRB	Aleksandar Ignjatović
7	MF	HUN	Richárd Vernes
8	MF	NGR	George Ikenne
9	FW	HUN	Gergely Délczeg
11	FW	ITA	Davide Lanzafame (loan from Catania)
13	DF	ITA	Raffaele Alcibiade (loan from Juventus)
15	FW	ITA	Leandro Martínez
18	MF	HUN	Attila Lőrinczy
19	FW	SRB	Filip Holender
20	MF	HUN	Gellért Ivancsics
22	FW	CIV	Souleymane Diaby
23	DF	ROU	Claudiu Pascariu

No.	Pos.	Nation	Player
24	MF	MLI	Drissa Diarra
25	DF	CRO	Ivan Lovrić
26	MF	HUN	Patrik Hidi
27	FW	CMR	Hervé Tchami
28	FW	HUN	Gergely Bobál
30	MF	HUN	Bálint Vécsei
31	GK	HUN	Márton Czuczi
33	MF	SRB	Boris Živanović
34	GK	HUN	Norbert Szemerédi
35	MF	NGR	Henry Odia
36	DF	HUN	Botond Baráth
71	GK	HUN	Szabolcs Kemenes
77	MF	HUN	Gergő Nagy
90	MF	NGR	Marshal Johnson

== Transfers ==
=== Summer ===
In: Note: Flags indicate national team as defined under FIFA eligibility rules; some limited exceptions apply. Players may hold more than one non-FIFA nationality.

No.	Pos.	Nation	Player
3	DF	SEN	Souleymane Tandia (from (France) Villefranche)
4	DF	SRB	Aleksandar Ignjatović (from (Serbia) Borac Čačak)
6	MF	MLI	Mamadou Diakité (from (Mauritania) Ksar)
8	MF	NGR	George Ikenne (free agent)
13	FW	SRB	Marko Rajić (from (Serbia) Mladenovac)
16	FW	HUN	Roland Vólent (loan return from Soproni VSE)
17	FW	SEN	Abass Cheikh Dieng (loan return from (Vietnam) Sông Lam Nghệ An)
18	FW	LBR	Joel Toe (free agent)
19	FW	SEN	Ibrahima Thiam (from (Belgium) Roeselare)
23	FW	SRB	Filip Kostić (from (Serbia) Radnički Stobex)
24	MF	MLI	Drissa Diarra (from (Switzerland) Bellinzona)
33	MF	SRB	Boris Živanović (from (Serbia) Mačva Šabac)
35	MF	NGR	Henry Odia
90	MF	NGR	Marshal Johnson (from (Belgium) Saint-Gilloise)
—	DF	HUN	Géza Fazakas (loan return from BKV Előre)

Out: Note: Flags indicate national team as defined under FIFA eligibility rules; some limited exceptions apply. Players may hold more than one non-FIFA nationality.

No.	Pos.	Nation	Player
1	GK	HUN	Iván Tóth (retired)
4	DF	CIV	Jean-Baptiste Akassou (to Pécs)
6	DF	ROU	Sorin Botis (to Békéscsaba)
8	MF	HUN	Norbert Hajdú (to Zalaegerszeg)
14	FW	BIH	Emir Hadžić (to (Bosnia and Herzegovina) Sarajevo)
18	FW	MNE	Bojan Božović (loan return to Siófok)
19	FW	BRA	Nicolas Ceolin (loan return to Győr)
21	MF	ARG	Matías Sebastián Porcari
23	GK	ROU	András Sánta (to Pécs)
24	MF	HUN	Adrián Horváth (to Pécs)
32	MF	HUN	Richárd Czár (loan to (Austria) First Vienna)
57	DF	CHI	Tomás Díaz (loan return to (Belgium) Saint-Gilloise)
81	MF	HUN	Norbert Németh (to Eger)
90	MF	NGR	Marshal Johnson (loan return to (Belgium) Saint-Gilloise)
—	DF	HUN	Géza Fazakas (to Sopron)

=== Winter ===
In: Note: Flags indicate national team as defined under FIFA eligibility rules; some limited exceptions apply. Players may hold more than one non-FIFA nationality.

No.	Pos.	Nation	Player
11	FW	ITA	Davide Lanzafame (loan from (Italy) Catania)
13	DF	ITA	Raffaele Alcibiade (loan from (Italy) Juventus)
15	FW	ITA	Leandro Martínez (from (Italy) Cremonese)
18	MF	HUN	Attila Lőrinczy (from Budapest Honvéd II)
19	FW	SRB	Filip Holender (from Budapest Honvéd U-19)
23	DF	ROU	Claudiu Pascariu (from (Romania) Târgu Mureș)
28	FW	HUN	Gergely Bobál (from Budapest Honvéd U-19)
—	MF	HUN	Mihály Csábi (from Budapest Honvéd U-19)
—	DF	ITA	Nicola Canzian (from (Italy) SPAL)

Out: Note: Flags indicate national team as defined under FIFA eligibility rules; some limited exceptions apply. Players may hold more than one non-FIFA nationality.

No.	Pos.	Nation	Player
5	DF	HUN	András Debreceni (to Budapest Honvéd II)
11	MF	CRO	Boris Bjelkanović (to Putnok)
13	FW	SRB	Marko Rajić
15	DF	MNE	Marko Vidović (to Eger)
16	FW	HUN	Krisztián Nagy (loan to Kazicbarcika)
19	FW	SEN	Ibrahima Thiam
29	DF	HUN	Alexisz Novák (to Budapest Honvéd II)
70	FW	HUN	Milán Faggyas (to Szolnok)
85	FW	SEN	Dieng Abass (loan to (Vietnam) Thanh Hóa)
99	FW	ITA	Donato Bottone

- List of Hungarian football transfers summer 2012
- List of Hungarian football transfers winter 2012–13

== Statistics ==
=== Appearances and goals ===
Last updated on 2 June 2013.

No.	Pos	Nat	Player	Total		OTP Bank Liga		Europa League		Hungarian Cup		League Cup	
No.	Pos	Nat	Player	Apps	Goals	Apps	Goals	Apps	Goals	Apps	Goals	Apps	Goals
2	DF	(Romania) ROU	Sergiu Moga	9	0	3	0	0	0	2	0	4	0
3	DF	(Senegal) SEN	Souleymane Tandia	19	2	13	1	0	0	3	1	3	0
4	DF	(Serbia) SRB	Aleksandar Ignjatović	40	2	29	1	4	0	4	1	3	0
7	MF	(Hungary) HUN	Richárd Vernes	35	14	22	5	4	2	5	4	4	3
8	MF	(Nigeria) NGR	George Ikenne	21	0	14	0	0	0	3	0	4	0
9	FW	(Hungary) HUN	Gergely Délczeg	32	13	22	10	4	0	3	0	3	3
11	FW	(Italy) ITA	Davide Lanzafame	13	6	10	5	0	0	2	0	1	1
13	DF	(Italy) ITA	Raffaele Alcibiade	9	0	7	0	0	0	2	0	0	0
15	FW	(Italy) ITA	Leandro Martínez	14	7	11	6	0	0	1	0	2	1
18	MF	(Hungary) HUN	Attila Lőrinczy	1	0	1	0	0	0	0	0	0	0
19	FW	(Serbia) SRB	Filip Holender	6	0	5	0	0	0	0	0	1	0
20	MF	(Hungary) HUN	Gellért Ivancsics	30	1	19	1	4	0	4	0	3	0
22	FW	(Ivory Coast) CIV	Souleymane Diaby	25	4	18	3	4	0	1	0	2	1
23	DF	(Romania) ROU	Claudiu Pascariu	2	0	1	0	0	0	0	0	1	0
24	MF	(Mali) MLI	Drissa Diarra	31	5	15	1	4	0	5	1	7	3
25	DF	(Croatia) CRO	Ivan Lovrić	38	1	26	1	4	0	3	0	5	0
26	MF	(Hungary) HUN	Patrik Hidi	41	2	25	1	4	0	4	0	8	1
27	FW	(Cameroon) CMR	Hervé Tchami	19	4	12	3	4	1	0	0	3	0
28	FW	(Hungary) HUN	Gergely Bobál	6	0	5	0	0	0	0	0	1	0
30	MF	(Hungary) HUN	Bálint Vécsei	30	4	25	4	1	0	3	0	1	0
31	GK	(Hungary) HUN	Márton Czuczi	8	-11	3	-2	0	0	1	-1	4	-8
33	MF	(Serbia) SRB	Boris Živanović	30	3	24	2	0	0	2	0	4	1
34	GK	(Hungary) HUN	Norbert Szemerédi	2	-4	1	-4	0	0	0	0	1	0
35	MF	(Nigeria) NGR	Henry Odia	7	1	3	0	0	0	0	0	4	1
36	DF	(Hungary) HUN	Botond Baráth	32	2	21	1	1	0	5	1	5	0
71	GK	(Hungary) HUN	Szabolcs Kemenes	37	-43	26	-27	4	-5	4	-4	3	-7
77	MF	(Hungary) HUN	Gergő Nagy	21	3	15	3	0	0	2	0	4	0
90	MF	(Nigeria) NGR	Marshal Johnson	19	1	12	1	4	0	0	0	3	0
Youth players:
6	MF	(Mali) MLI	Mamadou Diakité	3	0	0	0	0	0	1	0	2	0
14	DF	(Romania) ROU	Sebastian Remeș	3	0	0	0	0	0	0	0	3	0
17	FW	(Hungary) HUN	László Erdélyi	2	0	0	0	0	0	0	0	2	0
18	FW	(Liberia) LBR	Joel Toe	1	0	0	0	0	0	0	0	1	0
21	DF	(Hungary) HUN	János Fejes	2	0	0	0	0	0	1	0	1	0
23	FW	(Serbia) SRB	Filip Kostić	4	0	0	0	0	0	1	0	3	0
32	DF	(Hungary) HUN	Máté Varga	1	0	0	0	0	0	0	0	1	0
92	FW	(Hungary) HUN	Roland Vólent	1	0	0	0	0	0	1	0	0	0
Players out to loan:
16	FW	(Hungary) HUN	Krisztián Nagy	2	1	1	0	0	0	1	1	0	0
85	FW	(Senegal) SEN	Dieng Cheikh Abass	11	2	7	1	0	0	1	0	3	1
Players no longer at the club:
5	DF	(Hungary) HUN	András Debreceni	17	0	10	0	4	0	0	0	3	0
11	MF	(Croatia) CRO	Boris Bjelkanović	1	0	0	0	0	0	0	0	1	0
13	FW	(Serbia) SRB	Marko Rajić	1	0	0	0	0	0	0	0	1	0
15	DF	(Montenegro) MNE	Marko Vidović	9	0	2	0	4	0	1	0	2	0
70	FW	(Hungary) HUN	Milán Faggyas	21	3	12	0	2	0	3	1	4	2
99	FW	(Italy) ITA	Donato Bottone	2	0	0	0	0	0	1	0	1	0

=== Top scorers ===
Includes all competitive matches. The list is sorted by shirt number when total goals are equal.

Last updated on 2 June 2013

Position	Nation	Number	Name	OTP Bank Liga	European League	Hungarian Cup	League Cup	Total
1	(Hungary)	7	Richárd Vernes	5	2	4	3	14
2	(Hungary)	9	Gergely Délczeg	10	0	0	3	13
3	(Italy)	15	Leandro Martínez	6	0	0	1	7
4	(Italy)	11	Davide Lanzafame	5	0	0	1	6
5	(Mali)	24	Drissa Diarra	1	0	1	3	5
6	(Hungary)	30	Bálint Vécsei	4	0	0	0	4
7	(Cameroon)	27	Hervé Tchami	3	1	0	0	4
8	(Ivory Coast)	22	Souleymane Diaby	3	0	0	1	4
9	(Hungary)	77	Gergő Nagy	3	0	0	0	3
10	(Serbia)	33	Boris Živanović	2	0	0	1	3
11	(Hungary)	70	Milán Faggyas	0	0	1	2	3
12	(Serbia)	4	Aleksandar Ignjatović	1	0	1	0	2
13	(Hungary)	36	Botond Baráth	1	0	1	0	2
14	(Senegal)	3	Souleymane Tandia	1	0	1	0	2
15	(Senegal)	85	Dieng Cheikh Abass	1	0	0	1	2
16	(Hungary)	26	Patrik Hidi	1	0	0	1	2
17	(Nigeria)	90	Marshal Johnson	1	0	0	0	1
18	(Hungary)	20	Gellért Ivancsics	1	0	0	0	1
19	(Croatia)	25	Ivan Lovrić	1	0	0	0	1
20	(Hungary)	16	Krisztián Nagy	0	0	1	0	1
21	(Nigeria)	35	Henry Odia	0	0	0	1	1
/	/	/	Own Goals	0	0	0	0	0
			TOTALS	50	3	10	18	81

=== Disciplinary record ===
Includes all competitive matches. Players with 1 card or more included only.

Last updated on 2 June 2013

Position	Nation	Number	Name	OTP Bank Liga		Europea League		Hungarian Cup		League Cup		Total (Hu Total)	
Position	Nation	Number	Name	Yellow card	Red card	Yellow card	Red card	Yellow card	Red card	Yellow card	Red card	Yellow card	Red card
DF	(Romania)	2	Sergiu Moga	1	0	0	0	0	0	0	0	1 (1)	0 (0)
DF	(Senegal)	3	Souleymane Tandia	5	1	0	0	0	0	0	0	5 (5)	1 (1)
DF	(Serbia)	4	Aleksandar Ignjatović	7	0	0	0	0	1	1	0	8 (7)	1 (0)
DF	(Hungary)	5	András Debreceni	2	0	0	0	0	0	0	0	2 (2)	0 (0)
MF	(Hungary)	7	Richárd Vernes	2	0	2	1	1	0	0	0	5 (2)	1 (0)
MF	(Nigeria)	8	George Ikenne	4	0	0	0	1	0	0	0	5 (4)	0 (0)
FW	(Hungary)	9	Gergely Délczeg	4	0	1	0	0	0	1	0	6 (4)	0 (0)
FW	(Italy)	11	Davide Lanzafame	4	1	0	0	0	1	1	0	5 (4)	2 (1)
DF	(Italy)	13	Raffaele Alcibiade	2	0	0	0	1	0	0	0	3 (2)	0 (0)
DF	(Montenegro)	15	Marko Vidović	2	0	0	0	1	0	0	0	3 (2)	0 (0)
FW	(Italy)	15	Leandro Martínez	3	0	0	0	0	0	2	0	5 (3)	0 (0)
MF	(Hungary)	20	Gellért Ivancsics	2	0	1	0	0	0	0	0	3 (2)	0 (0)
FW	(Ivory Coast)	22	Souleymane Diaby	4	0	0	0	0	0	0	0	4 (4)	0 (0)
MF	(Mali)	24	Drissa Diarra	4	1	0	0	0	1	3	1	7 (4)	3 (1)
DF	(Croatia)	25	Ivan Lovrić	8	0	1	0	0	0	1	0	10 (8)	0 (0)
MF	(Hungary)	26	Patrik Hidi	5	0	0	0	1	0	2	0	8 (5)	0 (0)
FW	(Cameroon)	27	Hervé Tchami	1	0	1	0	0	0	0	0	2 (1)	0 (0)
MF	(Hungary)	30	Bálint Vécsei	7	0	0	0	1	1	1	0	9 (7)	1 (0)
MF	(Serbia)	33	Boris Živanović	7	0	0	0	0	0	0	0	7 (7)	0 (0)
DF	(Hungary)	36	Botond Baráth	5	2	1	0	1	0	0	0	7 (5)	2 (2)
FW	(Hungary)	70	Milán Faggyas	3	0	0	0	0	0	0	0	3 (3)	0 (0)
GK	(Hungary)	71	Szabolcs Kemenes	0	1	0	0	1	0	1	0	2 (0)	1 (1)
MF	(Nigeria)	90	Marshal Johnson	2	0	1	0	0	0	0	0	3 (2)	0 (0)
			TOTALS	84	6	8	1	8	4	13	1	113 (84)	12 (6)

=== Overall ===
Games played	47 (30 OTP Bank Liga, 4 UEFA Europa League, 5 Hungarian Cup and 8 Hungarian League Cup)
Games won	23 (15 OTP Bank Liga, 2 UEFA Europa League, 3 Hungarian Cup and 3 Hungarian League Cup)
Games drawn	10 (7 OTP Bank Liga, 0 UEFA Europa League, 0 Hungarian Cup and 3 Hungarian League Cup)
Games lost	14 (8 OTP Bank Liga, 2 UEFA Europa League, 2 Hungarian Cup and 2 Hungarian League Cup)
Goals scored	81
Goals conceded	61
Goal difference	+20
Yellow cards	113
Red cards	12
Worst discipline	(Mali) Drissa Diarra (7 (yellow card) , 3 (red card) )
Best result	4–0 (H) v Gyirmót SE – Hungarian League Cup – 13 November 2012
Best result	4–0 (H) v Diósgyőri VTK – Hungarian Cup – 21 November 2012
Worst result	0–4 (H) v FC Anzhi Makhachkala – UEFA Europa League – 26 July 2012
Worst result	0–4 (H) v Videoton FC – OTP Bank Liga – 3 March 2013
Most appearances	(Hungary) Patrik Hidi (41 appearances)
Top scorer	(Hungary) Richárd Vernes (14 goals)
Points	79/141 (56.03%)

Last updated: 2 June 2013

== Nemzeti Bajnokság I ==
=== Matches ===
29 July 2012 1	Siófok	0–1	Budapest Honvéd	Siófok, Somogy County
17:00 CEST		(Report)	Ignjatović 79'	Stadium: Révész Street Stadium; Attendance: 1,000; Referee: (Hungary) Szabolcs Szilasi

5 August 2012 2	Budapest Honvéd	2–1	Diósgyőr	Budapest, Pest County
18:30 CEST	Délczeg 17'; Diaby 63'	(Report)	Luque 34'	Stadium: Bozsik Stadion; Attendance: 3,000; Referee: (Hungary) Sándor Andó-Szabó

12 August 2012 3	Videoton	0–1	Budapest Honvéd	Székesfehérvár, Fejér County
15:30 CEST		(Report)	Živanović 11'	Stadium: Sóstói Stadion; Attendance: 4,000; Referee: (Hungary) Zsolt Szabó

19 August 2012 4	Budapest Honvéd	3–3	Paks	Budapest, Pest County
16:30 CEST	Živanović 16'; Vernes 62'; Délczeg 66'	(Report)	Kiss 8'; Simon 34'; Sipeki 45'	Stadium: Bozsik Stadion; Attendance: 1,500; Referee: (Hungary) Péter Solymosi

25 August 2012 5	Ferencváros	0–2	Budapest Honvéd	Budapest, Pest County
16:15 CEST		(Report)	Tchami 44'; Délczeg 90+2'	Stadium: Stadion Albert Flórián; Attendance: 5,000; Referee: (Hungary) Zoltán Iványi

31 August 2012 6	Budapest Honvéd	1–2	MTK Budapest	Budapest, Pest County
19:00 CEST	Diaby 89'	(Report)	Kanta 41', 56' (pen.)	Stadium: Bozsik Stadion; Attendance: 2,000; Referee: (Hungary) Ádám Radványi

16 September 2012 7	Debrecen	4–1	Budapest Honvéd	Debrecen, Hajdú-Bihar County
18:30 CEST	Sidibe 5', 64'; Coulibaly 8'; Szűcs 53'	(Report)	Vernes 21'	Stadium: Stadion Oláh Gábor Út; Attendance: 5,500; Referee: (Hungary) Tamás Bognár

22 September 2012 8	Budapest Honvéd	5–3	Kaposvár	Debrecen, Pest County
16:00 CEST	Diarra 20'; Johnson 30'; Délczeg 33'; Ivancsics 44'; Vécsei 65'	(Report)	Zámbó 40'; Balázs 75'; Haruna 86'	Stadium: Bozsik Stadion; Attendance: 1,500; Referee: (Hungary) Zoltán Iványi

29 September 2012 9	Kecskemét	2–1	Budapest Honvéd	Kecskemét, Bács-Kiskun County
14:00 CEST	Litsingi 3', 30'	(Report)	Délczeg 28'	Stadium: Széktói Stadion; Attendance: 2,000; Referee: (Hungary) Roland Veizer

5 October 2012 10	Budapest Honvéd	0–1	Pécs	Budapest, Pest County
17:00 CEST		(Report)	Okoronkwo 9'	Stadium: Bozsik Stadion; Attendance: 1,000; Referee: (Hungary) Gábor Oláh

20 October 2012 11	Pápa	2–1	Budapest Honvéd	Pápa, Veszprém County
14:00 CEST	Marić 42', 89' (pen.)	(Report)	Diaby 32'	Stadium: Stadion Várkerti; Attendance: 1,000; Referee: (Hungary) Balázs Böcskei

27 October 2012 12	Budapest Honvéd	2–2	Újpest	Budapest, Pest County
14:00 CEST	Délczeg 9' (pen.); Abass 65'	(Report)	Kabát 45'; Zaris 73'	Stadium: Bozsik Stadion; Attendance: 4,000; Referee: (Hungary) Mihály Fábián

4 November 2012 13	Győr	0–0	Budapest Honvéd	Győr, Győr-Moson-Sopron County
18:30 CET		(Report)		Stadium: ETO Park; Attendance: 5,000; Referee: (Hungary) István Vad

10 November 2012 14	Eger	1–3	Budapest Honvéd	Budapest, Pest County
16:00 CEST	Németh 27'	(Report)	Délczeg 43' (pen.); Baráth 54'; Vernes 82'	Stadium: Stadion Rudolf Illovszky; Attendance: 350; Referee: (Hungary) Balázs Berke

18 November 2012 15	Budapest Honvéd	1–1	Szombathely	Budapest, Pest County
18:30 CET	Vécsei 51'	(Report)	Ugrai 66'	Stadium: Bozsik Stadion; Attendance: 1,000; Referee: (Hungary) Dániel Becséri

23 November 2012 16	Budapest Honvéd	2–0	Siófok	Budapest, Pest County
18:30 CET	Tandia 68'; Délczeg 90+2' (pen.)	(Report)		Stadium: Bozsik Stadion; Attendance: 500; Referee: (Hungary) Balázs Böcskei

1 December 2012 17	Diósgyőr	3–1	Budapest Honvéd	Miskolc, Borsod-Abaúj-Zemplén County
18:30 CET	Silva 2'; Gohér 88'; Bacsa 90+3'	(Report)	Délczeg 82' (pen.)	Stadium: DVTK Stadion; Attendance: 6,000; Referee: (Hungary) István Vad

3 March 2013 18	Budapest Honvéd	0–4	Videoton	Budapest, Pest County
18:30 CET		(Report)	Mitrović 25', 75'; Oliveira 31'; Kovács 35'	Stadium: Bozsik Stadion; Attendance: 2,000; Referee: (Hungary) Sándor Andó-Szabó

8 March 2013 19	Paks	0–3	Budapest Honvéd	Paks, Tolna County
17:00 CET		(Report)	Vécsei 4', 12'; Vernes 35'	Stadium: Stadion PSE; Attendance: 1,500; Referee: (Hungary) Zoltán Iványi

16 April 2013 20	Budapest Honvéd	1–0	Ferencváros	Budapest, Pest County
20:30 CEST	Tchami 66'	(Report)		Stadium: Bozsik Stadion; Attendance: 4,500; Referee: (Hungary) Zoltán Iványi

30 March 2013 21	MTK Budapest	1–0	Budapest Honvéd	Budapest, Pest County
14:00 CET	Pölöskei 47'	(Report)		Stadium: Hidegkuti Nándor Stadium; Attendance: 1,500; Referee: (Hungary) Zsolt Szabó

7 April 2013 22	Budapest Honvéd	2–2	Debrecen	Budapest, Pest County
16:30 CEST	Nagy 5'; Martínez 76' (pen.)	(Report)	Pölöskey 34'; Ignjatović 44' (o.g.)	Stadium: Bozsik Stadion; Attendance: 1,000; Referee: (Hungary) Ádám Farkas

12 April 2013 23	Kaposvár	1–2	Budapest Honvéd	Kaposvár, Somogy County
17:00 CET	Waltner 14'	(Report)	Tchami 60' (pen.); Lanzafame 67'	Stadium: Stadion Kaposvár Rákóczi; Attendance: 2,000; Referee: (Hungary) József Berger

20 April 2013 24	Budapest Honvéd	0–0	Kecskemét	Budapest, Pest County
14:00 CEST		(Report)		Stadium: Bozsik Stadion; Attendance: 1,500; Referee: (Hungary) Gábor Oláh

28 April 2013 25	Pécs	0–3	Budapest Honvéd	Pécs, Baranya County
18:30 CEST		(Report)	Lanzafame 20'; Martínez 52' (pen.), 56'	Stadium: Stadion PMFC; Attendance: 2,460; Referee: (Hungary) Péter Solymosi

4 May 2013 26	Budapest Honvéd	2–0	Pápa	Budapest, Pest County
16:00 CEST	Délczeg 45'; Nagy 81'	(Report)		Stadium: Bozsik Stadion; Attendance: 2,000; Referee: (Hungary) József Erdős

11 May 2013 27	Újpest	2–4	Budapest Honvéd	Budapest, Pest County
18:30 CEST	Christ 86'; Remili 90+2'	(Report)	Martínez 8', 52', 69'; Lovrić 19'	Stadium: Szusza Ferenc Stadium; Attendance: 3,000; Referee: (Hungary) Zsolt Szabó

19 May 2013 28	Budapest Honvéd	2–0	Győr	Budapest, Pest County
18:30 CEST	Hidi 62'; Lanzafame 82'	(Report)		Stadium: Bozsik Stadion; Attendance: 1,500; Referee: (Hungary) Sándor Andó-Szabó

25 May 2013 29	Budapest Honvéd	3–0	Eger	Budapest, Pest County
16:00 CEST	Lanzafame 22', 73' (pen.); Nagy 76'	(Report)		Stadium: Bozsik Stadion; Referee: (Hungary) Dániel Becséri

1 June 2012 30	Haladás	1–1	Budapest Honvéd	Szombathely, Vas County
16:00 CEST	Simon 30'	(Report)	Vernes 15'	Stadium: Rohonci úti Stadion; Attendance: 2,600; Referee: (Hungary) Mihály Fábián

=== Classification ===
Pos	Team	Pld	W	D	L	GF	GA	GD	Pts	Qualification or relegation
1	Győr (C)	30	19	7	4	57	33	+24	64	Qualification for Champions League second qualifying round
2	Videoton	30	16	6	8	52	24	+28	54	Qualification for Europa League first qualifying round
3	Honvéd	30	15	7	8	50	36	+14	52	Qualification for Europa League first qualifying round
4	MTK	30	15	6	9	43	30	+13	51	
5	Ferencváros	30	13	10	7	51	36	+15	49	

Source: mlsz.hu (in Hungarian)
Rules for classification: 1st points; 2nd overall wins; 3rd goal difference; 4th head-to-head points; 5th head-to-head goal difference; 6th head-to-head away goals scored; 7th fair-play points; 8th drawing of lots
(C) Champions

=== Results summary ===
Overall								Home						Away					
Pld	W	D	L	GF	GA	GD	Pts	W	D	L	GF	GA	GD	W	D	L	GF	GA	GD
30	15	7	8	50	36	+14	52	7	5	3	26	19	+7	8	2	5	24	17	+7

Last updated: 2 June 2013.
Source: NB1

=== Results by round ===
Round	1	2	3	4	5	6	7	8	9	10	11	12	13	14	15	16	17	18	19	20	21	22	23	24	25	26	27	28	29	30
Ground	A	H	A	H	A	H	A	H	A	H	A	H	A	A	H	H	A	H	A	H	A	H	A	H	A	H	A	H	H	A
Result	W	W	W	D	W	L	L	W	L	L	L	D	D	W	D	W	L	L	W	W	L	D	W	D	W	W	W	W	W	D
Position	6	1	1	1	1	4	5	4	4	5	6	6	5	5	5	5	5	8	6	5	6	6	6	6	5	4	4	4	3	3

Updated to match(es) played on 2 June 2013. Source: Matches
A = Away; H = Home; W = Win; D = Draw; L = Loss

== Hungarian Cup ==
31 October 2012 Round 3	Pécsi VSC	1–4	Budapest Honvéd	Pécs, Baranya County
12:30 CET	Cvenits 47' (pen.)	(Report)	Tandia 9'; Vernes 53'; Nagy 72'; Diarra 79'	Stadium: PVSK Stadium; Attendance: 700; Referee: (Hungary) Norbert Kiss

21 November 2012 Round of 16 (1st leg)	Budapest Honvéd	4–0	Diósgyőr	Budapest, Pest County
18:00 CET	Ignjatović 67'; Baráth 83'; Vernes 88', 90+2' (pen.)	(Report)		Stadium: Bozsik Stadion; Attendance: 800; Referee: (Hungary) János Takács

28 November 2012 Round of 16 (2nd leg)	Diósgyőr	1–2 (1–6 agg.)	Budapest Honvéd	Miskolc, Borsod-Abaúj-Zemplén County
18:00	Tisza 45'	(Report)	Faggyas 18'; Vernes 54'	Stadium: DVTK Stadion; Attendance: 1,000; Referee: (Hungary) Gergely Szőts

23 February 2013 Quarter-final (1st leg)	Budapest Honvéd	0–1	Győr	Budapest, Pest County
14:00 CET		(Report)	Kink 80' (pen.)	Stadium: Bozsik Stadion; Attendance: 0 Referee: (Hungary) Ádám Farkas

27 February 2013 Quarter-final (2nd leg)	Győr	2–0 (3–0 agg.)	Budapest Honvéd	Győr, Győr-Moson-Sopron County
18:00	Völgyi 71'; Kamber 76'	(Report)		Stadium: ETO Park; Attendance: 1,500; Referee: (Hungary) Tamás Bognár

== League Cup ==
=== Group stage ===
5 September 2012 1	Budapest Honvéd	0–3	Győr	Budapest, Pest County
18:00 CEST		(Report)	Aleksidze 6'; Dudás 29'; Andrić 88'	Stadium: Bozsik Stadion; Attendance: 200; Referee: (Hungary) Dániel Becséri

12 September 2012 2	Gyirmót	1–2	Budapest Honvéd	Győr, Győr-Moson-Sopron County
18:00 CEST	Magasföldi 71'	(Report)	Délczeg 42' (pen.) 51'	Stadium: Ménfői úti Sporttelep; Attendance: 400; Referee: (Hungary) Gergely Szőts

10 October 2012 3	Szombathely	3–3	Budapest Honvéd	Szombathely, Vas County
17:00 CEST	Andorka 2', 6'; Radó 18'	(Report)	Faggyas 31'; Hidi 75'; Abass 84'	Stadium: Rohonci úti Stadion; Attendance: 400; Referee: (Hungary) Zoltán J. Kovács

13 October 2012 4	Budapest Honvéd	2–0	Szombathely	Budapest, Pest County
16:00 CEST	Faggyas 33'; Délczeg 87'	(Report)		Stadium: Bozsik Stadion; Attendance: 200; Referee: (Hungary) László Varga

13 November 2012 5	Budapest Honvéd	4–0	Gyirmót	Budapest, Pest County
16:00 CET	Vernes 2', 31', 40'; Diarra 29'	(Report)		Stadium: Bozsik Stadion; Attendance: 100; Referee: (Hungary) Róbert Nagy

5 December 2012 6	Győr	2–2	Budapest Honvéd	Győr, Győr-Moson-Sopron County
13:00 CET	Đorđević 22'; Kronaveter 72'	(Report)	Odia 37'; Diaby 83'	Stadium: ETO Park; Attendance: 500; Referee: (Hungary) Szabolcs Szilasi

==== Classification ====
Pos	Team	Pld	W	D	L	GF	GA	GD	Pts	Qualification
1	Győr	6	3	2	1	18	8	+10	11	Advance to knockout phase
2	Honvéd	6	3	2	1	13	9	+4	11	Advance to knockout phase
3	Gyirmót	6	1	2	3	11	18	−7	5	
4	Haladás	6	1	2	3	11	18	−7	5	

Rules for classification: 1) points; 2) goal difference; 3) number of goals scored.

=== knockout phase ===
20 February 2013 Quarter-final (1st leg)	Pécs	3–2	Budapest Honvéd	Pécs, Baranya County
17:00 CET	Grumić 8'; Wittrédi 77', 89'	(Report)	Diarra 33'; Lanzafame 72'	Stadium: Stadion PMFC; Attendance: 300; Referee: (Hungary) István Vad

6 March 2013 Quarter-final (2nd leg)	Budapest Honvéd	3–3 (5–6 agg.)	Pécs	Budapest, Pest County
18:00	Diarra 18'; Živanović 22'; Martínez 51'	(Report)	Koller 16'; Horváth 48'; Szatmári 61'	Stadium: Bozsik Stadion; Attendance: 300; Referee: (Hungary) József Berger

== UEFA Europa League ==
The First and Second Qualifying Round draws took place at UEFA headquarters in Nyon, Switzerland on 25 June 2012.

5 July 2012 Q1 Leg 1	Flamurtari Vlorë (Albania)	0–1	(Hungary) Budapest Honvéd FC	Vlorë
20:30 CEST		(Report)	Vernes 46'	Stadium: Flamurtari Stadium; Attendance: 6,000; Referee: (Luxembourg) Sven Bindels

12 July 2012 Q1 Leg 2	Budapest Honvéd FC (Hungary)	2–0 (3–0 agg.)	(Albania) Flamurtari Vlorë	Budapest
20:30 CEST	Vernes 45+2'; Tchami 57'	(Report)		Stadium: Bozsik Stadion; Attendance: 1,800; Referee: (Azerbaijan) Vusal Aliyev

19 July 2012 Q2 Leg 1	FC Anzhi Makhachkala (Russia)	1–0	(Hungary) Budapest Honvéd FC	Ramenskoye
17:00 CEST	Jucilei 22'	Report		Stadium: Saturn Stadium; Attendance: 5,000; Referee: (Israel) Alon Yefet

26 July 2012 Q2 Leg 2	Budapest Honvéd FC (Hungary)	0–4 (0–5 agg.)	(Russia) FC Anzhi Makhachkala	Budapest
18:30 CEST		(Report)	Eto'o 7', 81'; Traoré 53'; Shatov 68'	Stadium: Bozsik Stadion; Attendance: 5,100; Referee: (Italy) Luca Banti
