= 2013–14 Budapest Honvéd FC season =

Budapest Honvéd FC
2013–14 season
- Chairman: George Hemingway
- Manager: Marco Rossi (until 28 April 2014); Miklós Simon
- NB 1: 9th
- UEFA Europa League: Second Qualifying Round
- Hungarian Cup: Round of 16
- Hungarian League Cup: Group stage
- Top goalscorer: League: Ayub Daud (7); All: Ayub Daud (8)
- Highest home attendance: 5,000 vs Ferencváros (20 April 2014)
- Lowest home attendance: 100 vs Szigetszentmiklós (10 November 2013)
Home colours	Away colours

The 2013–14 season will be Budapest Honvéd FC's 103rd competitive season, 9th consecutive season in the OTP Bank Liga and 104th year in existence as a football club.

== First team squad ==
Note: Flags indicate national team as defined under FIFA eligibility rules; some limited exceptions apply. Players may hold more than one non-FIFA nationality.

No.	Pos.	Nation	Player
2	DF	HUN	Dávid Bobál
4	DF	SRB	Aleksandar Ignjatović
5	DF	HUN	Endre Botka
7	MF	HUN	Richárd Vernes
8	MF	NGR	George Ikenne
9	FW	HUN	Gergely Bobál
11	MF	SOM	Ayub Daud
13	DF	ITA	Raffaele Alcibiade
14	FW	GHA	Emmanuel Mensah
16	MF	HUN	Mihály Csábi
17	MF	PAN	Anibal Godoy
18	MF	HUN	Attila Lőrinczy
19	FW	SRB	Filip Holender
20	MF	HUN	Dániel Prosser
21	MF	ITA	Andrea Mancini

No.	Pos.	Nation	Player
22	MF	HUN	Valér Kapacina
24	MF	MLI	Drissa Diarra
25	DF	CRO	Ivan Lovrić
26	MF	HUN	Patrik Hidi
27	MF	CIV	Abdul Kader Keïta
28	FW	ITA	Emiliano Bonazzoli
29	MF	HUN	Richárd Kozma
30	MF	HUN	Bálint Vécsei
31	GK	HUN	Márton Czuczi
33	MF	SRB	Boris Živanović
36	DF	HUN	Botond Baráth
37	FW	ITA	Arturo Lupoli (loan from Varese)
41	MF	CMR	Thomas Job
71	GK	HUN	Szabolcs Kemenes
77	MF	HUN	Gergő Nagy

== Transfers ==
=== Summer ===
In: Note: Flags indicate national team as defined under FIFA eligibility rules; some limited exceptions apply. Players may hold more than one non-FIFA nationality.

No.	Pos.	Nation	Player
2	DF	HUN	Dávid Bobál (from Honvéd Academy)
5	DF	HUN	Endre Botka (from Honvéd Academy)
6	DF	HUN	János Kovács (from (England) Luton Town)
9	FW	COL	Edixon Perea (from (Chile) Changchun Yatai)
11	MF	SOM	Ayub Daud (from (Switzerland) Chiasso)
13	DF	ITA	Raffaele Alcibiade (from (Italy) Juventus)
13	DF	HUN	Gyula Csemer (from Honvéd Academy)
14	FW	GHA	Emmanel Mensah (from (Ghana) United Soccer Training Academy)
17	MF	PAN	Aníbal Godoy (from (Panama) Chepo)
20	MF	HUN	Dániel Prosser (from Honvéd Academy)
21	FW	ITA	Andrea Mancini (from (Spain) Valladolid B)
23	FW	ITA	Emanuele Testardi (loan from (Italy) Sampdoria)
29	MF	HUN	Richárd Kozma (from Honvéd Academy)
32	MF	HUN	Richárd Czár (loan return from (Austria) First Vienna)
34	GK	HUN	Norbert Szemerédi (from Honvéd II)
41	MF	CMR	Thomas Job (from (Italy) Bologna)

Out: Note: Flags indicate national team as defined under FIFA eligibility rules; some limited exceptions apply. Players may hold more than one non-FIFA nationality.

No.	Pos.	Nation	Player
3	DF	SEN	Souleymane Tandia
5	DF	HUN	András Debreceni (to Diósgyőr)
6	MF	MLI	Mamadou Diakité (to (Italy) Crotone)
9	FW	HUN	Gergely Délczeg (loan to Paks)
11	FW	ITA	Davide Lanzafame (loan return to (Italy) Catania)
13	DF	ITA	Raffaele Alcibiade (loan return to (Italy) Juventus)
15	FW	ITA	Leandro Martínez (to Győr)
20	MF	HUN	Gellért Ivancsics (to Pápa)
22	FW	CIV	Souleymane Diaby
23	FW	ITA	Emanuele Testardi (loan return to (Italy) Sampdoria)
23	DF	ROU	Claudiu Pascariu (to (Romania) Atletic Arad)
27	FW	CMR	Hervé Tchami (to (Poland) Pogoń Szczecin)
29	DF	HUN	Alexisz Novák (to Siófok)
32	MF	HUN	Richárd Czár (loan to Sopron)
35	MF	NGR	Henry Odia (to (Moldova) Dacia Chișinău)
90	MF	NGR	Marshal Johnson

=== Winter ===
In: Note: Flags indicate national team as defined under FIFA eligibility rules; some limited exceptions apply. Players may hold more than one non-FIFA nationality.

No.	Pos.	Nation	Player
9	FW	COL	Edixon Perea (from (China) Changchun)
23	FW	HUN	Bence Daru (from Honvéd II)
28	FW	ITA	Emiliano Bonazzoli (from (Italy) Marano)
37	FW	ITA	Arturo Lupoli (loan from (Italy) Varese)
92	DF	PAN	Aníbal Mello (from (Panama) Chepo)

Out: Note: Flags indicate national team as defined under FIFA eligibility rules; some limited exceptions apply. Players may hold more than one non-FIFA nationality.

No.	Pos.	Nation	Player
9	FW	COL	Edixon Perea
13	DF	HUN	Gyula Csemer
23	FW	ITA	Emanuele Testardi (loan return to (Italy) Sampdoria)

- List of Hungarian football transfers summer 2013
- List of Hungarian football transfers winter 2013–14

== Statistics ==
=== Appearances and goals ===
Last updated on 1 June 2014.

No.	Pos	Nat	Player	Total		OTP Bank Liga		Europa League		Hungarian Cup		League Cup	
No.	Pos	Nat	Player	Apps	Goals	Apps	Goals	Apps	Goals	Apps	Goals	Apps	Goals
2	DF	(Hungary) HUN	Dávid Bobál	4	0	1	0	0	0	1	0	2	0
4	DF	(Serbia) SRB	Aleksandar Ignjatović	35	2	27	2	4	0	2	0	2	0
5	DF	(Hungary) HUN	Endre Botka	5	0	3	0	0	0	0	0	2	0
7	MF	(Hungary) HUN	Richárd Vernes	24	6	19	4	1	0	3	1	1	1
8	MF	(Nigeria) NGR	George Ikenne	30	1	22	0	3	0	2	0	3	1
9	FW	(Hungary) HUN	Gergely Bobál	7	0	4	0	0	0	0	0	3	0
11	MF	(Somalia) SOM	Ayub Daud	20	8	16	7	0	0	1	1	3	0
13	DF	(Italy) ITA	Raffaele Alcibiade	34	2	25	1	4	1	2	0	3	0
14	FW	(Ghana) GHA	Emmanuel Mensah	5	0	1	0	0	0	1	0	3	0
16	MF	(Hungary) HUN	Mihály Csábi	10	1	4	0	0	0	2	1	4	0
17	MF	(Panama) PAN	Anibal Godoy	7	0	6	0	0	0	1	0	0	0
18	MF	(Hungary) HUN	Attila Lőrinczy	8	1	5	1	0	0	1	0	2	0
19	FW	(Serbia) SRB	Filip Holender	33	7	23	3	3	3	3	1	4	0
20	MF	(Hungary) HUN	Dániel Prosser	18	2	11	1	0	0	2	0	5	1
21	MF	(Italy) ITA	Andrea Mancini	17	0	9	0	2	0	2	0	4	0
22	MF	(Hungary) HUN	Valér Kapacina	4	1	4	1	0	0	0	0	0	0
24	MF	(Mali) MLI	Drissa Diarra	25	2	17	0	4	2	1	0	3	0
25	DF	(Croatia) CRO	Ivan Lovrić	35	3	24	3	4	0	2	0	5	0
26	MF	(Hungary) HUN	Patrik Hidi	36	3	28	3	4	0	1	0	3	0
27	MF	(Ivory Coast) CIV	Abdul Kader Keïta	2	0	2	0	0	0	0	0	0	0
28	FW	(Italy) ITA	Emiliano Bonazzoli	9	0	9	0	0	0	0	0	0	0
29	MF	(Hungary) HUN	Richárd Kozma	6	1	1	0	2	1	1	0	2	0
30	MF	(Hungary) HUN	Bálint Vécsei	32	5	28	5	2	0	1	0	1	0
31	GK	(Hungary) HUN	Márton Czuczi	6	-7	1	-1	0	0	1	-1	4	-5
33	MF	(Serbia) SRB	Boris Živanović	16	3	12	3	4	0	0	0	0	0
36	DF	(Hungary) HUN	Botond Baráth	31	0	24	0	3	0	3	0	1	0
37	FW	(Italy) ITA	Arturo Lupoli	4	0	4	0	0	0	0	0	0	0
41	MF	(Cameroon) CMR	Thomas Job	25	0	20	0	0	0	3	0	2	0
71	GK	(Hungary) HUN	Szabolcs Kemenes	36	-48	29	-38	4	-6	2	-2	1	-2
77	MF	(Hungary) HUN	Gergő Nagy	26	1	22	1	2	0	0	0	2	0
Youth players:
6	DF	(Hungary) HUN	János Kovács	3	0	0	0	0	0	1	0	2	0
11	MF	(Hungary) HUN	Milán Miskei	1	0	0	0	0	0	0	0	1	0
15	DF	(Romania) ROU	Sergiu Moga	1	0	0	0	0	0	0	0	1	0
20	MF	(Hungary) HUN	Márk Koszta	1	0	0	0	0	0	0	0	1	0
27	FW	(Nigeria) NGR	Celestine Chukwuebuka	1	0	0	0	0	0	0	0	1	0
34	GK	(Hungary) HUN	Norbert Szemerédi	2	-4	0	0	0	0	0	0	2	-4
46	DF	(Hungary) HUN	Kristóf Polyák	2	0	0	0	0	0	1	0	1	0
51	DF	(Romania) ROU	Anatolis Sundas	2	0	0	0	0	0	0	0	2	0
Out to Loan:
9	FW	(Hungary) HUN	Gergely Délczeg	5	2	1	0	4	2	0	0	0	0
Players no longer at the club:
3	DF	(Senegal) SEN	Souleymane Tandia	2	0	1	0	0	0	0	0	1	0
9	FW	(Colombia) COL	Edixon Perea	8	2	6	2	0	0	1	0	1	0
13	DF	(Hungary) HUN	Gyula Csemer	2	0	0	0	0	0	1	0	1	0
22	FW	(Ivory Coast) CIV	Souleymane Diaby	6	2	3	0	3	2	0	0	0	0
23	FW	(Italy) ITA	Emanuele Testardi	14	5	7	0	3	3	0	0	4	2

=== Top scorers ===
Includes all competitive matches. The list is sorted by shirt number when total goals are equal.

Last updated on 1 June 2014

Position	Nation	Number	Name	OTP Bank Liga	Hungarian Cup	Europa League	League Cup	Total
1	(Somalia)	11	Ayub Daud	7	0	1	0	8
2	(Serbia)	19	Filip Holender	3	3	1	0	7
3	(Hungary)	7	Richárd Vernes	4	0	1	1	6
4	(Hungary)	30	Bálint Vécsei	5	0	0	0	5
5	(Italy)	23	Emanuele Testardi	0	3	0	2	5
6	(Hungary)	26	Patrik Hidi	3	0	0	0	3
7	(Croatia)	25	Ivan Lovrić	3	0	0	0	3
8	(Serbia)	33	Boris Živanović	3	0	0	0	3
9	(Ivory Coast)	22	Souleymane Diaby	0	2	0	0	2
10	(Hungary)	9	Gergely Délczeg	0	2	0	0	2
11	(Mali)	24	Drissa Diarra	0	2	0	0	2
12	(Italy)	13	Raffaele Alcibiade	1	1	0	0	2
13	(Colombia)	9	Edixon Perea	2	0	0	0	2
14	(Serbia)	4	Aleksandar Ignjatović	2	0	0	0	2
15	(Hungary)	20	Dániel Prosser	1	0	0	1	2
16	(Hungary)	29	Richárd Kozma	0	1	0	0	1
17	(Hungary)	77	Gergő Nagy	1	0	0	0	1
18	(Hungary)	22	Valér Kapacina	1	0	0	0	1
19	(Hungary)	18	Attila Lőrinczy	1	0	0	0	1
20	(Hungary)	16	Mihály Csábi	0	0	1	0	1
21	(Nigeria)	8	George Ikenne	0	0	0	1	1
/	/	/	Own Goals	0	0	0	0	0
			TOTALS	37	14	4	5	60

=== Disciplinary record ===
Includes all competitive matches. Players with 1 card or more included only.

Last updated on 1 June 2014

Position	Nation	Number	Name	OTP Bank Liga		Europa League		Hungarian Cup		League Cup		Total (Hu Total)	
Position	Nation	Number	Name	Yellow card	Red card	Yellow card	Red card	Yellow card	Red card	Yellow card	Red card	Yellow card	Red card
DF	(Serbia)	4	Aleksandar Ignjatović	7	0	0	0	0	0	0	1	7 (7)	1 (0)
DF	(Hungary)	5	Endre Botka	2	0	0	0	0	0	0	0	2 (2)	0 (0)
DF	(Hungary)	6	János Kovács	0	0	0	0	1	0	0	0	1 (0)	0 (0)
MF	(Hungary)	7	Richárd Vernes	4	0	0	0	0	0	0	0	4 (4)	0 (0)
MF	(Nigeria)	8	George Ikenne	2	1	1	0	0	0	0	0	3 (2)	1 (1)
FW	(Somalia)	11	Ayub Daud	4	0	0	0	0	0	0	0	4 (4)	0 (0)
DF	(Italy)	13	Raffaele Alcibiade	8	1	0	0	2	0	1	0	11 (8)	1 (1)
MF	(Panama)	17	Anibal Godoy	2	0	0	0	0	0	0	0	2 (2)	0 (0)
MF	(Hungary)	18	Attila Lőrinczy	1	0	0	0	0	0	0	0	1 (1)	0 (0)
FW	(Serbia)	19	Filip Holender	3	0	1	0	1	0	1	0	6 (3)	0 (0)
MF	(Hungary)	20	Dániel Prosser	1	0	0	0	0	0	0	0	1 (1)	0 (0)
MF	(Italy)	21	Andrea Mancini	1	0	2	0	2	0	2	0	7 (1)	0 (0)
FW	(Ivory Coast)	22	Souleymane Diaby	1	0	0	0	0	0	0	0	1 (1)	0 (0)
FW	(Italy)	23	Emanuele Testardi	2	0	0	0	0	0	1	0	3 (2)	0 (0)
MF	(Mali)	24	Drissa Diarra	6	0	0	0	1	0	0	0	7 (6)	0 (0)
DF	(Croatia)	25	Ivan Lovrić	8	1	0	0	0	0	1	0	9 (8)	1 (1)
MF	(Hungary)	26	Patrik Hidi	4	0	0	0	0	1	0	0	4 (4)	1 (0)
FW	(Italy)	28	Emiliano Bonazzoli	5	0	0	0	0	0	0	0	5 (5)	0 (0)
MF	(Hungary)	30	Bálint Vécsei	6	0	0	0	0	0	0	0	6 (6)	0 (0)
MF	(Serbia)	33	Boris Živanović	4	0	0	0	0	0	0	0	4 (4)	0 (0)
DF	(Hungary)	36	Botond Baráth	3	0	1	0	0	0	0	0	4 (3)	0 (0)
MF	(Cameroon)	41	Thomas Job	7	0	0	0	1	0	0	0	8 (7)	0 (0)
GK	(Hungary)	71	Szabolcs Kemenes	1	0	0	0	0	0	0	0	1 (1)	0 (0)
MF	(Hungary)	77	Gergő Nagy	2	0	1	0	0	0	0	0	3 (2)	0 (0)
			TOTALS	84	3	6	0	8	1	6	1	104 (84)	5 (3)

=== Overall ===
Games played	43 (30 OTP Bank Liga, 4 Europa League, 3 Hungarian Cup and 6 Hungarian League Cup)
Games won	14 (10 OTP Bank Liga, 2 Europa League, 1 Hungarian Cup and 1 Hungarian League Cup)
Games drawn	8 (6 OTP Bank Liga, 0 Europa League, 1 Hungarian Cup and 1 Hungarian League Cup)
Games lost	21 (14 OTP Bank Liga, 2 Europa League, 1 Hungarian Cup and 4 Hungarian League Cup)
Goals scored	60
Goals conceded	58
Goal difference	+2
Yellow cards	104
Red cards	5
Worst discipline	(Italy) Raffaele Alcibiade (11 (yellow card) , 1 (red card) )
Best result	9–0 (H) v Čelik Nikšić – UEFA Europa League – 11 July 2013
Worst result	0–3 (H) v Szigetszentmiklós – Hungarian League Cup – 20 November 2013
Most appearances	(Hungary) Patrik Hidi (36 appearances)
Top scorer	(Somalia) Ayub Daud (8 goals)
Points	50/129 (38.76%)

Last updated: 1 June 2014

== Nemzeti Bajnokság I ==
=== Matches ===
28 July 2013 1	Kecskemét	3–1	Honvéd	Kecskemét, Bács-Kiskun County
18:30 CEST	Bulajić 7'; Eliomar 66'; Oussou 90+2'	(Report)	Vécsei 90+1'	Stadium: Széktói Stadion; Attendance: 2,314; Referee: (Hungary) Péter Solymosi

4 August 2013 2	Honvéd	0–1	Pápa	Budapest, Pest County
18:30 CEST		(Report)	Griffiths 88'	Stadium: Bozsik Stadion; Attendance: 900; Referee: (Hungary) Mihály Fábián

11 August 2013 3	Újpest	1–1	Honvéd	Budapest, Pest County
20:30 CEST	Simon 20'	(Report)	Vernes 48' (pen.)	Stadium: Szusza Ferenc Stadium; Attendance: 2,467; Referee: (Hungary) István Vad

18 August 2013 4	Honvéd	3–0	Puskás	Budapest, Pest County
16:30 CEST	Ignjatović 32'; Vernes 43'; Živanović 51'	(Report)		Stadium: Bozsik Stadion; Attendance: 1,100; Referee: (Hungary) József Erdős

25 August 2013 5	Paks	1–1	Honvéd	Paks, Tolna County
18:30 CEST	Simon 28'	(Report)	Hidi 51'	Stadium: Stadion PSE; Attendance: 1,000; Referee: (Hungary) István Vad

1 September 2013 6	Kaposvár	0–4	Honvéd	Kaposvár, Somogy County
18:30 CEST		(Report)	Vécsei 4'; Vernes 48' (pen.); Holender 61'; Lovrić 65'	Stadium: Stadion Kaposvár Rákóczi; Attendance: 2,000; Referee: (Hungary) Péter Solymosi

14 September 2013 7	Honvéd	0–2	Mezőkövesd	Budapest, Pest County
18:00 CEST		(Report)	Harsányi 29'; Pilibaitis 57'	Stadium: Bozsik Stadion; Attendance: 600; Referee: (Hungary) Tamás Bognár

21 September 2013 8	Diósgyőr	2–0	Honvéd	Miskolc, Borsod-Abaúj-Zemplén County
14:00 CEST	Nikházi 3'; Bacsa 71'	(Report)		Stadium: DVTK Stadion; Attendance: 4,852; Referee: (Hungary) Viktor Kassai

28 September 2013 9	Honvéd	2–1	Szombathely	Budapest, Pest County
18:00 CEST	Daud 44' (pen.), 56' (pen.)	(Report)	Radó 71'	Stadium: Bozsik Stadion; Attendance: 500; Referee: (Hungary) Péter Solymosi

6 October 2013 10	Ferencváros	1–2	Honvéd	Budapest, Pest County
16:30 CEST	Gyömbér 11'	(Report)	Alcibiade 37'; Daud 53'	Stadium: Ferenc Puskás Stadium; Attendance: 7,433; Referee: (Hungary) Sándor Andó-Szabó

19 October 2013 11	Honvéd	3–1	Pécs	Budapest, Pest County
20:00 CEST	Lovrić 50'; Daud 78' (pen.); Hidi 79'	(Report)	Grumić 8'	Stadium: Bozsik Stadion; Attendance: 800; Referee: (Hungary) Dániel Becséri

27 October 2013 12	Videoton	1–2	Honvéd	Székesfehérvár, Fejér County
16:30 CET	Nikolić 21'	(Report)	Nagy 27'; Perea 90+2'	Stadium: Sóstói Stadion; Attendance: 4,202; Referee: (Hungary) Tamás Bognár

3 November 2013 13	Honvéd	1–1	Győr	Budapest, Pest County
18:30 CET	Daud 71'	(Report)	Martínez 84'	Stadium: Bozsik Stadion; Attendance: 1,500; Referee: (Hungary) Péter Solymosi

9 November 2013 14	MTK	1–1	Honvéd	Budapest, Pest County
20:00 CET	Kanta 83'	(Report)	Hidi 84'	Stadium: Hidegkuti Nándor Stadium; Attendance: 1,500; Referee: (Hungary) Ádám Farkas

23 November 2013 15	Honvéd	1–3	Debrecen	Budapest, Pest County
14:00 CET	Perea 83' (pen.)	(Report)	Zsidai 45'; Szakály 58'; Kulcsár 63'	Stadium: Bozsik Stadion; Attendance: 2,000; Referee: (Hungary) Viktor Kassai

29 November 2013 16	Honvéd	1–1	Kecskemét	Budapest, Pest County
19:00 CET	Holender 90+5'	(Report)	Gréczi 77'	Stadium: Bozsik Stadion; Attendance: 1,000; Referee: (Hungary) Dániel Becséri

7 December 2013 17	Pápa	1–0	Honvéd	Pápa, Veszprém County
20:00 CET	Griffiths 2'	(Report)		Stadium: Stadion Várkerti; Attendance: 450; Referee: (Hungary) József Erdős

1 March 2014 18	Honvéd	3–2	Újpest	Budapest, Pest County
14:00 CET	Živanović 13'; Daud 65' (pen.); Vécsei 81'	(Report)	Vasiljević 44'; Kosović 86'	Stadium: Bozsik Stadion; Attendance: 2,500; Referee: (Hungary) Viktor Kassai

8 March 2014 19	Puskás	0–4	Honvéd	Székesfehérvár, Fejér County
16:00 CET		(Report)	Vécsei 13'; Ignjatović 36'; Lovrić 59'; Prosser 77'	Stadium: Sóstói Stadion; Attendance: 600; Referee: (Hungary) Ádám Farkas

17 March 2014 20	Honvéd	1–1	Paks	Budapest, Pest County
19:00 CET	Daud 52' (pen.)	(Report)	Délczeg 42' (pen.)	Stadium: Bozsik Stadion; Attendance: 1,500; Referee: (Hungary) Ádám Németh

22 March 2014 21	Honvéd	1–0	Kaposvár	Budapest, Pest County
18:00 CET	Holender 23'	(Report)		Stadium: Bozsik Stadion; Attendance: 1,500; Referee: (Hungary) Ádám Farkas

28 March 2014 22	Mezőkövesd	1–0	Honvéd	Mezőkövesd, Borsod-Abaúj-Zemplén County
19:00 CET	Menougong 26'	(Report)		Stadium: Mezőkövesdi Városi Stadion; Attendance: 2,800; Referee: (Hungary) Péter Solymosi

5 April 2014 23	Honvéd	1–2	Diósgyőr	Budapest, Pest County
14:00 CEST	Živanović 9'	(Report)	Futács 21'; Kostić 60'	Stadium: Bozsik Stadion; Attendance: 2,000; Referee: (Hungary) József Erdős

13 April 2014 24	Haladás	2–0	Honvéd	Szombathely, Vas County
16:30 CEST	Hrepka 24' 54'	(Report)		Stadium: Rohonci Street Stadium; Attendance: 3,020; Referee: (Hungary) Sándor Andó-Szabó

20 April 2014 25	Honvéd	0–2	Ferencváros	Budapest, Pest County
16:30 CEST		(Report)	Pavlović 28'; Leonardo 35' (pen.)	Stadium: Bozsik Stadion; Attendance: 5,000; Referee: (Hungary) Viktor Kassai

27 April 2014 26	Pécs	1–0	Honvéd	Pécs, Baranya County
18:30 CEST	Kővári 29'	(Report)		Stadium: Stadion PMFC; Attendance: 1,300; Referee: (Hungary) Ádám Németh

3 May 2014 27	Honvéd	0–1	Videoton	Budapest, Pest County
14:00 CEST		(Report)	Stopira 43'	Stadium: Bozsik Stadion; Attendance: 1,000; Referee: (Hungary) Péter Solymosi

11 May 2014 28	Győr	4–2	Honvéd	Győr, Győr-Moson-Sopron County
16:30 CEST	Rudolf 12'; Pátkai 29', 77'; Burgos 90+2'	(Report)	Vécsei 32'; Kapacina 44'	Stadium: ETO Park; Attendance: 1,500; Referee: (Hungary) Zoltán Iványi

17 May 2014 29	Honvéd	0–2	MTK	Budapest, Pest County
14:00 CEST		(Report)	Kanta 56', 62'	Stadium: Bozsik Stadion; Attendance: 500; Referee: (Hungary) József Erdős

31 May 2014 30	Debrecen	0–2	Honvéd	Debrecen, Hajdú-Bihar County
20:00 CEST		(Report)	Vernes 63'; Lőrinczy 90+3'	Stadium: Nagyerdei Stadion; Attendance: 20,000; Referee: (Hungary) Sándor Andó-Szabó

=== Classification ===
Pos	Team	Pld	W	D	L	GF	GA	GD	Pts
7	Pécs	30	12	9	9	41	38	+3	45
8	MTK	30	11	7	12	42	36	+6	40
9	Honvéd	30	10	6	14	37	39	−2	36
10	Kecskemét	30	9	9	12	36	51	−15	36
11	Paks	30	8	10	12	39	42	−3	34

Source: mlsz.hu (in Hungarian)
Rules for classification: 1st points; 2nd overall wins; 3rd goal difference; 4th head-to-head points; 5th head-to-head goal difference; 6th head-to-head away goals scored; 7th fair-play points; 8th drawing of lots

=== Results summary ===
Overall								Home						Away					
Pld	W	D	L	GF	GA	GD	Pts	W	D	L	GF	GA	GD	W	D	L	GF	GA	GD
30	10	6	14	37	38	−1	36	5	3	7	17	19	−2	5	3	7	20	19	+1

Last updated: 1 June 2014.
Source: NB1

=== Results by round ===
Round	1	2	3	4	5	6	7	8	9	10	11	12	13	14	15	16	17	18	19	20	21	22	23	24	25	26	27	28	29	30
Ground	A	H	A	H	A	A	H	A	H	A	H	A	H	A	H	H	A	H	A	H	H	A	H	A	H	A	H	A	H	A
Result	L	L	D	W	D	W	L	L	W	W	W	W	D	D	L	D	L	W	W	D	W	L	L	L	L	L	L	L	L	W
Position	13	14	13	9	10	8	12	12	9	8	7	4	6	7	7	8	9	7	5	7	4	5	7	8	8	8	8	10	11	9

Updated to match(es) played on 1 June 2014. Source: Matches
A = Away; H = Home; W = Win; D = Draw; L = Loss

== Hungarian Cup ==
30 October 2013 Round of 32	Kemecse	1–3	Honvéd	Kemecse, Szabolcs-Szatmár-Bereg County
12:30 CET	Asztalos 63'	(Report)	Vernes 2'; Csábi 41'; Holender 90'	Stadium: Kemecse Sporttelep; Attendance: 1,000; Referee: (Hungary) Róbert Nagy

26 November 2013 Round of 16 (1st leg)	Honvéd	1–1	Pécs	Budapest, Pest County
18:00 CET	Daud 50'	(Report)	Mohl 59'	Stadium: Bozsik Stadion; Attendance: 150; Referee: (Hungary) Tamás Bognár

4 December 2013 Round of 16 (2nd leg)	Pécs	1–0 (2–1 agg.)	Honvéd	Pécs, Baranya County
18:00 CET	Grumić 88'	Report		Stadium: Stadion PMFC; Attendance: 800; Referee: (Hungary) Sándor Andó-Szabó

== League Cup ==
=== Group stage ===
4 September 2013 1	Szigetszentmiklós	2–0	Honvéd	Szigetszentmiklós, Pest County
16:30 CEST	Pilavdžić 2'; Takács 70'	(Report)		Stadium: Stadium Sport Street; Attendance: 300; Referee: (Hungary) Róbert Nagy

11 September 2013 2	Honvéd	5–3	Cegléd	Budapest, Pest County
18:00 CEST	Testardi 20', 26'; Prosser 50'; Vernes 57'; Ikenne 87'	(Report)	Rebryk 67' (pen.); Takács 69'; Koós 89'	Stadium: Bozsik Stadion; Attendance: 150; Referee: (Hungary) József Berger

9 October 2013 3	Honvéd	0–0	Puskás	Budapest, Pest County
19:00 CEST		(Report)		Stadium: Bozsik Stadion; Attendance: 200; Referee: (Hungary) Roland Veizer

16 October 2013 4	Puskás	2–0	Honvéd	Felcsút, Fejér County
14:30 CEST	Haraszti 30'; Lencse 54'	(Report)		Stadium: Felcsúti Sportkomplexum; Attendance: 100; Referee: (Hungary) Balázs Böcskei

13 November 2013 5	Cegléd	1–0	Honvéd	Cegléd, Pest County
13:30 CET	Miklósvári 77'	(Report)		Stadium: Stadion Malomtó széli Attendance: 200; Referee: (Hungary) Ferenc Karakó

10 November 2013 6	Honvéd	0–3	Szigetszentmiklós	Budapest, Pest County
13:00 CET		(Report)	Fekete 48'; Bonifert 62'; Csikortás 88'	Stadium: Bozsik Stadion; Attendance: 100; Referee: (Hungary) János Takács

==== Classification ====
Pos	Team	Pld	W	D	L	GF	GA	GD	Pts	Qualification
1	Puskás	6	3	2	1	11	5	+6	11	Advance to knockout phase
2	Szigetszentmiklós	6	3	1	2	9	6	+3	10	Advance to knockout phase
3	Cegléd	6	2	2	2	8	11	−3	8	
4	Budapest Honvéd	6	1	1	4	5	11	−6	4	

Rules for classification: 1) points; 2) goal difference; 3) number of goals scored.

== UEFA Europa League ==
The First and Second Qualifying Round draws took place at UEFA headquarters in Nyon, Switzerland on 24 June 2013.

4 July 2013 Q1 Leg 1	Čelik Nikšić (Montenegro)	1–4	(Hungary) Budapest Honvéd	Nikšić
17:30 CEST	Radović 16'	(Report)	Délczeg 38'; Holender 41', 62'; Diaby 52'	Stadium: Gradski stadion Attendance: 1,300; Referee: (Sweden) Martin Strömbergsson

11 July 2013 Q1 Leg 2	Budapest Honvéd (Hungary)	9–0 (13–1 agg.)	(Montenegro) Čelik Nikšić	Budapest
20:30 CEST	Holender 14'; Diaby 23'; Diarra 36'; Délczeg 49' (pen.); Testardi 66' (pen.), 75', 87'; Alcibiade 67'; Kozma 81'	Report		Stadium: Bozsik Stadion; Attendance: 1,800; Referee: (Belgium) Jonathan Lardot

18 July 2013 Q2 Leg 1	Vojvodina (Serbia)	2–0	(Hungary) Budapest Honvéd	Novi Sad
20:30 CEST	Trajković 19'; Vranješ 71' (pen.)	(Report)		Stadium: Karađorđe Stadium; Attendance: 5,000; Referee: (France) Ruddy Buquet

25 July 2013 Q2 Leg 2	Budapest Honvéd (Hungary)	1–3 (1–5 agg.)	(Serbia) Vojvodina	Budapest
20:30 CEST	Diarra 44'	Report	Bilbija 27'; Alivodić 41'; Vranješ 64'	Stadium: Bozsik Stadion; Attendance: 1,800; Referee: (Switzerland) Stephan Studer

== Pre-season ==
22 June 2013 1	Budapest Honvéd FC (Hungary)	3–0	(Slovakia) MŠK Rimavská Sobota	Budapest, Pest County
CEST	Délczeg; Vernes; Kozma	(Report)		Stadium: Bozsik Stadium; Attendance: 300; Referee: (Hungary) Gergely Szőts

26 June 2013 2	Budapest Honvéd FC (Hungary)	1–2	(Slovakia) FK DAC 1904 Dunajská Streda	Budapest, Pest County
CEST	Diaby	(Report)	Gašparík; Nulíček	Stadium: Bozsik Stadium; Attendance: 200; Referee: (Hungary) Gábor Oláh

29 June 2013 3	Budapest Honvéd FC (Hungary)	0–1	(Poland) Piast Gliwice	Budapest, Pest County
CEST		(Report)	Zbozień 31'	Stadium: Bozsik Stadium
