= List of Hungarian football transfers summer 2012 =

This is a list of Hungarian football transfers for the 2012 summer transfer window by club. Only transfers of clubs in the OTP Bank Liga are included.

The summer transfer window opened on 1 June 2012, although a few transfers may have taken place prior to that date. The window closed at midnight on 31 August 2012. Players without a club may join one at any time, either during or in between transfer windows.

== OTP Bank Liga ==
=== BFC Siófok ===
In: Note: Flags indicate national team as defined under FIFA eligibility rules; some limited exceptions apply. Players may hold more than one non-FIFA nationality.

No.	Pos.	Nation	Player
4	DF	HUN	András Fejes (loan from Videoton)
6	MF	HUN	Tamás Egerszegi (loan from Újpest)
8	MF	HUN	József Windecker (loan from Győr)
9	FW	BIH	Jusuf Dajić (from Vasas)
10	MF	HUN	Norbert Sipos (from Szombathely)
10	FW	HUN	János Farkas (loan return from Tatabánya)
11	MF	HUN	Máté Kiss (loan from Győr)
12	GK	HUN	Péter Kurucz (from (England) West Ham United)
12	GK	HUN	Zoltán Szatmári (from (Denmark) Lyngby Boldklub)
14	FW	HUN	Szabolcs Pál (from Diósgyőr)
15	DF	HUN	Marcell Fodor (loan from Újpest)
16	DF	SRB	Stefan Deák (loan from (Spain) Deportivo B)
17	MF	HUN	Tamás Nagy (from (Austria) Sankt Andrä)
18	DF	HUN	András Gál (from MTK Budapest)
21	FW	HUN	Balázs Zamostny (loan from Újpest)
23	MF	SRB	Milan Cokić (loan from Kecskemét)
24	DF	HUN	Noel Fülöp (from Ferencváros)
24	MF	HUN	Attila Horváth (loan return from Ajka)
25	FW	HUN	Marcell Molnár (from MTK Budapest)
29	FW	MNE	Bojan Božović (loan return from Budapest Honvéd)

Out: Note: Flags indicate national team as defined under FIFA eligibility rules; some limited exceptions apply. Players may hold more than one non-FIFA nationality.

No.	Pos.	Nation	Player
4	DF	HUN	András Fejes (loan return to Videoton)
6	MF	HUN	Tamás Egerszegi (loan return to Újpest)
8	MF	HUN	Norbert Heffler (loan return to Paks)
9	FW	HUN	Attila Simon (to Paks)
10	FW	HUN	János Farkas (to Sopron)
11	MF	HUN	Szabolcs Kanta (loan to Ajka)
12	GK	HUN	Zoltán Szatmári (to Vasas)
12	GK	SVK	Ladislav Rybánsky (to Diósgyőr)
14	FW	HUN	Szabolcs Pál (loan return to Diósgyőr)
15	FW	HUN	Thomas Sowunmi (to Ajka)
17	DF	HUN	István Nagy (loan return to Paks)
21	DF	HUN	Dániel Lengyel (to Békéscsaba)
23	MF	HUN	Tamás Huszák (loan return to Debrecen)
24	DF	HUN	Szilárd Éles (to Mezőkövesd)
24	MF	HUN	Attila Horváth (loan to Ajka)
25	FW	HUN	Zsolt Haraszti (loan return to Videoton)
26	GK	HUN	Árpád Milinte (to Pálhalma)
29	DF	CMR	Eugene Fomumbod (to Veszprém)
29	FW	MNE	Bojan Božović (to (Serbia) Hajduk Beograd)

=== Budapest Honvéd FC ===
In: Note: Flags indicate national team as defined under FIFA eligibility rules; some limited exceptions apply. Players may hold more than one non-FIFA nationality.

No.	Pos.	Nation	Player
3	DF	SEN	Souleymane Tandia (from (France) Villefranche)
4	DF	SRB	Aleksandar Ignjatović (from (Serbia) Borac Čačak)
6	MF	MLI	Mamadou Diakité (from (Mauritania) Ksar)
8	MF	NGA	George Ikenne (free agent)
13	FW	SRB	Marko Rajić (from (Serbia) Mladenovac)
16	FW	HUN	Roland Vólent (loan return from Soproni VSE)
17	FW	SEN	Abass Cheikh Dieng (loan return from (Vietnam) Sông Lam Nghệ An)
18	FW	LBR	Joel Toe (free agent)
19	FW	SEN	Ibrahima Thiam (from (Belgium) Roeselare)
23	FW	SRB	Filip Kostić (from (Serbia) Radnički Stobex)
24	MF	MLI	Drissa Diarra (from (Switzerland) Bellinzona)
33	MF	SRB	Boris Živanović (from (Serbia) Mačva Šabac)
90	MF	NGA	Marshal Johnson (from (Belgium) Saint-Gilloise)
—	DF	HUN	Géza Fazakas (loan return from BKV Előre)

Out: Note: Flags indicate national team as defined under FIFA eligibility rules; some limited exceptions apply. Players may hold more than one non-FIFA nationality.

No.	Pos.	Nation	Player
1	GK	HUN	Iván Tóth (retired)
4	DF	CIV	Jean-Baptiste Akassou (to Pécs)
6	DF	ROU	Sorin Botis (to Békéscsaba)
8	MF	HUN	Norbert Hajdú (to Zalaegerszeg)
14	FW	BIH	Emir Hadžić (to (Bosnia and Herzegovina) Sarajevo)
18	FW	MNE	Bojan Božović (loan return to Siófok)
19	FW	BRA	Nicolas Ceolin (loan return to Győr)
21	MF	ARG	Matías Sebastián Porcari (to (Uruguay) Progreso)
23	GK	ROU	András Sánta (to Pécs)
24	MF	HUN	Adrián Horváth (to Pécs)
32	MF	HUN	Richárd Czár (loan to (Austria) First Vienna)
81	MF	HUN	Norbert Németh (to Eger)
57	DF	CHI	Tomás Díaz (loan return to (Belgium) Saint-Gilloise)
—	DF	HUN	Géza Fazakas (to Sopron)

=== Debreceni VSC ===
In: Note: Flags indicate national team as defined under FIFA eligibility rules; some limited exceptions apply. Players may hold more than one non-FIFA nationality.

No.	Pos.	Nation	Player
19	FW	BRA	Vinícius (loan return from Nyíregyháza)
23	MF	FRA	Slimane Bouadla (from (France) Châteauroux)
26	FW	SEN	Ibrahima Sidibe (from (Belgium) Westerlo)
31	DF	HUN	Róbert Varga (from Kecskemét)
38	FW	HUN	Szabolcs Csorba (loan return from Nyíregyháza)
53	MF	HUN	Botond Birtalan (from (Romania) Bihor Oradea)
77	MF	HUN	Péter Czvitkovics (from (Belgium) Kortrijk)
77	DF	HUN	Dávid Mohl (loan from Kecskemét)
88	MF	HUN	Tamás Huszák (loan return from Siófok)

Out: Note: Flags indicate national team as defined under FIFA eligibility rules; some limited exceptions apply. Players may hold more than one non-FIFA nationality.

No.	Pos.	Nation	Player
5	MF	HUN	Gyula Illés (to Gyirmót)
6	MF	HON	Luis Ramos (to Kecskemét)
8	DF	HUN	Balázs Nikolov (to Vasas)
14	FW	NGA	Eugène Salami (loan to Kecskemét)
26	MF	NED	Adnan Alisic (to (Netherlands) Dordrecht)
30	FW	BIH	Stevo Nikolić (loan to (Slovakia) Spartak Trnava)
77	DF	HUN	Dávid Mohl (loan return to Kecskemét)

=== Diósgyőri VTK ===
In: Note: Flags indicate national team as defined under FIFA eligibility rules; some limited exceptions apply. Players may hold more than one non-FIFA nationality.

No.	Pos.	Nation	Player
8	MF	HUN	Péter Takács (from Pápa)
11	DF	BRA	Jeff Silva (loan from Videoton)
12	GK	SVK	Ladislav Rybánsky (from Siófok)
16	MF	HUN	Tibor Halgas (loan return from Kazincbarcika)
18	MF	HUN	András Gosztonyi (from Videoton)
19	MF	HUN	Péter Szabó (loan return from Kazincbarcika)
24	FW	HUN	Szabolcs Pál (loan return from Siófok)
25	MF	HUN	Ákos Elek (from Videoton)
27	MF	SVK	Michal Hanek (from (Austria) Kapfenberg)
37	MF	SVK	Richárd Illés (loan return from Kazincbarcika)
63	GK	HUN	Róbert Ambrusics (from (England) Cambridge United)

Out: Note: Flags indicate national team as defined under FIFA eligibility rules; some limited exceptions apply. Players may hold more than one non-FIFA nationality.

No.	Pos.	Nation	Player
1	GK	CRO	Ivan Radoš (loan to (Azerbaijan) Kapaz)
8	MF	BOL	Vicente Arze (to (Belgium) Charleroi)
11	MF	HUN	Péter Takács (loan return to Pápa)
16	MF	HUN	Tibor Halgas (loan to Cegléd)
17	DF	HUN	Krisztián Budovinszky (to Zalaegerszeg)
19	MF	HUN	Péter Szabó (to Ajka)
21	FW	CMR	George Menougong (to Kazincbarcika)
24	FW	HUN	Szabolcs Pál (to Siófok)
37	MF	SVK	Richárd Illés (to Putnok)
75	MF	BRA	Bernardo Frizoni (to Zalaegerszeg)
98	MF	MAR	Youssef Sekour (loan to Pápa)
99	MF	HUN	Attila Dobos (to Mezőkövesd)

=== Egri FC ===
In: Note: Flags indicate national team as defined under FIFA eligibility rules; some limited exceptions apply. Players may hold more than one non-FIFA nationality.

No.	Pos.	Nation	Player
1	GK	SVN	Darko Brljak (from (Slovenia) Gorica)
4	DF	HUN	Gábor Kovács (from Vasas)
6	MF	AUT	Michael Stanislaw (from (Austria) Wiener Neustadt)
7	MF	HUN	Ádám Albert (from Vác)
8	MF	HUN	Norbert Németh (from Budapest Honvéd)
14	MF	HUN	Csaba Preklet (from (Italy) Reggina)
15	DF	MKD	Jasmin Mecinović (from (Norway) Sogndal)
20	MF	CZE	Jiří Kabele (from (Slovakia) Dunajská Streda)
68	GK	HUN	István Kövesfalvi (from Dabas)

Out: Note: Flags indicate national team as defined under FIFA eligibility rules; some limited exceptions apply. Players may hold more than one non-FIFA nationality.

No.	Pos.	Nation	Player
1	GK	HUN	Tamás Giák (to Austria)
4	DF	HUN	Viktor Benke (to Vác)
6	DF	HUN	Péter Bíró (loan return to Pápa)
7	MF	HUN	László Bojtor (to Rákospalota)
8	MF	HUN	Dávid Debreceni
15	MF	HUN	Ádám Fürjes (loan return to Vasas)
19	FW	ALG	Karim Benounes (to (Algeria) Constantine)
20	FW	HUN	János Olasz (to Rákospalota)
68	GK	HUN	István Kövesfalvi (Retired)
—	FW	HUN	József Kálmán (to Saágótarján)

=== Ferencvárosi TC ===
In: Note: Flags indicate national team as defined under FIFA eligibility rules; some limited exceptions apply. Players may hold more than one non-FIFA nationality.

No.	Pos.	Nation	Player
10	FW	SRB	Milan Perić (loan from Videoton)
11	FW	HUN	János Máté (from Videoton)
12	GK	HUN	Tamás Mester (loan return from Budaörsi SC)
13	MF	HUN	Dániel Böde (from Paks)
14	MF	ROU	Andrei Ionescu (from (Belgium) Royal Antwerp)
17	FW	HUN	Viktor Bölcsföldi (loan return from Szigetszentmiklós)
19	MF	HUN	Gábor Gyömbér (from Pápa)
20	MF	HUN	Attila Menyhárt (from Rákospalota)
21	DF	BIH	Muhamed Bešić (from (Germany) Hamburger SV)
30	MF	SRB	Vladan Čukić (from Kecskemét)
39	MF	HUN	Márk Orosz (from Szeged)
66	MF	SRB	Aleksandar Alempijević (from Kecskemét)
88	FW	BRA	Somália (from (Brazil) Bangu)

Out: Note: Flags indicate national team as defined under FIFA eligibility rules; some limited exceptions apply. Players may hold more than one non-FIFA nationality.

No.	Pos.	Nation	Player
10	MF	HUN	Krisztián Lisztes (to Szeged)
11	FW	HUN	Lóránt Oláh (loan return to Kaposvár)
12	GK	HUN	Tamás Mester (to Balmazújváros)
13	DF	BRA	Júnior (to (Azerbaijan) AZAL)
19	MF	SOM	Liban Abdi (to (Portugal) Olhanense)
20	MF	HUN	Dénes Rósa (to (Austria) Altheim)
21	MF	HUN	Norbert Zsivóczky (loan to Szigetszentmiklós)
25	MF	HUN	Béla Maróti (to Pápa)
27	MF	HUN	Dávid Kulcsár (to Paks)
29	DF	HUN	Noel Fülöp (to Siófok)
35	MF	ARG	Héctor Gabriel Morales (loan return to (Argentina) Estudiantes)
40	GK	HUN	Zoltán Végh (retired)
60	FW	HUN	Péter Pölöskey (to Debrecen)
78	DF	HUN	Zoltán Balog (to Gyirmót)
88	FW	BRA	Somália (loan return to (Brazil) Bangu)
97	FW	CRO	Marko Šimić (to (Poland) Bełchatów)

=== Győri ETO FC ===
In: Note: Flags indicate national team as defined under FIFA eligibility rules; some limited exceptions apply. Players may hold more than one non-FIFA nationality.

No.	Pos.	Nation	Player
7	FW	ROU	Mihai Dina (from (Romania) Petrolul Ploiești)
7	FW	BRA	Nicolas Ceolin (loan return from Budapest Honvéd)
8	FW	ALG	Fouad Bouguerra (loan return from (Algeria) Constantine)
9	MF	SVN	Rok Kronaveter (from (Germany) Energie Cottbus)
16	DF	HUN	Zoltán Lipták (from Újpest)
18	DF	HUN	Ádám Lang (from Veszprém)
19	MF	SRB	Nemanja Andrić (from (Serbia) Rad)
20	MF	ROU	Mihai Nicorec (loan return to Zalaegerszeg)
21	MF	CZE	Marek Střeštík (from (Czech Republic) Zbrojovka Brno)
22	MF	CZE	Michal Švec (from (Netherlands) Heerenveen)
26	DF	GEO	Lasha Totadze (loan return to (Georgia (country)) Dila Gori)
30	MF	GEO	Giorgi Ganugrava (loan return to Zalaegerszeg)

Out: Note: Flags indicate national team as defined under FIFA eligibility rules; some limited exceptions apply. Players may hold more than one non-FIFA nationality.

No.	Pos.	Nation	Player
6	MF	HUN	Zoltán Fehér (to Szombathely)
7	FW	BRA	Nicolas Ceolin (to Pécs)
8	FW	ALG	Fouad Bouguerra (to (Algeria) Oran)
9	MF	SVK	Otto Szabó (to Pápa)
14	MF	HUN	Máté Kiss (loan to Siófok)
16	MF	BRA	Ji-Paraná (to (United Arab Emirates) Al Ittihad)
18	MF	HUN	József Windecker (loan to Siófok)
19	FW	HUN	András Simon (loan to Pápa)
21	MF	CZE	Marek Střeštík (loan return to (Czech Republic) Zbrojovka Brno)
22	DF	CRO	Valentin Babić
26	DF	GEO	Lasha Totadze (to (Georgia (country)) Dinamo Batumi)
26	DF	HUN	Bence Zámbó (loan to Kaposvár)
27	GK	HUN	Péter Nacsa (loan to Pápa)
30	MF	GEO	Giorgi Ganugrava (to (Georgia (country)) Metalurgi Rustavi)

=== Kaposvári Rákóczi FC ===
In: Note: Flags indicate national team as defined under FIFA eligibility rules; some limited exceptions apply. Players may hold more than one non-FIFA nationality.

No.	Pos.	Nation	Player
9	FW	HUN	Róbert Waltner (from (Austria) Mattersburg)
11	MF	HUN	Bence Házi (loan return from BKV Előre)
14	FW	HUN	Lóránt Oláh (loan return from Ferencváros)
14	FW	MDA	Serghei Alexeev (loan return from (Israel) Maccabi Netanya)
19	FW	CRO	Bojan Vručina (from (Croatia) Slaven Belupo)
20	DF	HUN	Bence Zámbó (loan from Győr)
26	DF	HUN	Zalán Vadas (loan return from BKV Előre)
31	FW	SRB	Dragan Žmukić (from (Serbia) Senta)

Out: Note: Flags indicate national team as defined under FIFA eligibility rules; some limited exceptions apply. Players may hold more than one non-FIFA nationality.

No.	Pos.	Nation	Player
7	MF	BIH	Boris Gujić (to (Bosnia and Herzegovina) Sarajevo)
9	FW	SRB	Miroslav Grumić (to Pécs)
11	FW	SEN	Bara Bebeto (loan return to (Switzerland) Lugano)
14	FW	MDA	Serghei Alexeev (to (Russia) Yenisey Krasnoyarsk)
14	MF	GHA	Aaron Dankwah (loan return to (Switzerland) Lugano)
17	MF	SVK	Tomáš Sedlák (to (Austria) Weiden am See)
25	MF	HUN	Péter Farkas (to Vác)
29	DF	HUN	Károly Graszl (to (Cyprus) Nea Salamis)
31	DF	HUN	József Zsók (to Paks)

=== Kecskeméti TE ===
In: Note: Flags indicate national team as defined under FIFA eligibility rules; some limited exceptions apply. Players may hold more than one non-FIFA nationality.

No.	Pos.	Nation	Player
5	DF	HUN	István Farkas (loan return from Cegléd)
7	FW	HUN	Zsolt Balázs (from Zalaegerszeg)
9	FW	BRA	Jorginho (from (Malta) Qormi)
11	MF	HUN	Márkó Sós (from Rákospalota)
14	MF	HUN	Balázs Farkas (from Vasas)
20	FW	BRA	Tarabai (from (Malta) Hibernians)
24	MF	SRB	Predrag Vujović (from (Uzbekistan) Shurtan Guzar)
24	MF	HON	Luis Ramos (from Debrecen)
28	DF	HUN	Tamás Vaskó (from Videoton)
29	MF	HUN	Patrik Nagy (from Újpest)
30	FW	NGA	Eugène Salami (loan from Debrecen)
31	MF	CAN	Joseph Di Chiara (from (Russia) Krylia Sovetov)
—	MF	SRB	Milan Cokić (from (Serbia) Mladenovac)

Out: Note: Flags indicate national team as defined under FIFA eligibility rules; some limited exceptions apply. Players may hold more than one non-FIFA nationality.

No.	Pos.	Nation	Player
4	DF	HUN	Róbert Varga (to Debrecen)
7	MF	SRB	Aleksandar Alempijević (to Ferencváros)
9	FW	HUN	Marcell Balog (to Cegléd)
14	MF	SRB	Vladan Čukić (to Ferencváros)
19	FW	HUN	Ádám Hegedűs (to Mezőköverd)
21	MF	HUN	Gábor Bori (to Paks)
22	DF	HUN	Dávid Mohl (loan to Debrecen)
29	FW	HUN	László Lencse (loan return to Videoton)
33	GK	HUN	Gábor Németh (to Paks)
55	FW	HUN	Attila Tököli (to Paks)
83	GK	HUN	Csaba Borszéki (loan to Vác)
—	MF	SRB	Milan Cokić (loan to Siófok)
—	MF	HUN	Balázs Sarus (to Csorna)
—	MF	SRB	Vladan Brdarić (to Cegléd)

=== Lombard-Pápa TFC ===
In: Note: Flags indicate national team as defined under FIFA eligibility rules; some limited exceptions apply. Players may hold more than one non-FIFA nationality.

No.	Pos.	Nation	Player
7	FW	HUN	András Simon (loan from Győr)
11	MF	HUN	Péter Takács (loan return from Diósgyőr)
19	FW	HUN	Gergő Nagy (from (Austria) Sallingberg)
21	FW	SRB	Goran Marić (from (Kazakhstan) Zhetysu)
24	DF	HUN	Péter Bíró (loan return from Eger)
25	MF	HUN	Béla Maróti (from Ferencváros)
28	MF	SVK	Otto Szabó (from Győr)
45	GK	HUN	Péter Nacsa (loan from Győr)
55	DF	HUN	József Fellai (from Kozármisleny)
77	DF	HUN	Kornél Kaszás (loan return from Pálhalma)
98	MF	MAR	Youssef Sekour (loan from Diósgyőr)
99	FW	LVA	Aleksandrs Čekulajevs (from (Malta) Valletta)
—	MF	HUN	Electo Wilson (from Újpest)

Out: Note: Flags indicate national team as defined under FIFA eligibility rules; some limited exceptions apply. Players may hold more than one non-FIFA nationality.

No.	Pos.	Nation	Player
1	GK	HUN	Tamás Takács (to (Austria) Vornholz)
10	FW	HUN	Gergő Lovrencsics (loan to (Poland) Lech Poznań)
11	FW	HUN	Péter Szilágyi (to Vasas)
11	MF	HUN	Péter Takács (to Diósgyőr)
13	MF	HUN	Gábor Gyömbér (to Ferencváros)
14	MF	HUN	Krisztián Dóczi (loan to BKV Előre)
17	DF	HUN	Attila Farkas (to Nyíregyháza)
19	MF	HUN	Gergő Rása (loan to Vác)
24	DF	HUN	Péter Bíró (to (Switzerland) Emmenbrücke)
28	MF	HUN	Zoltán Szabó (to (Austria) Herzogenburg)
42	FW	HUN	Imre Csermelyi
77	DF	HUN	Kornél Kaszás (to Budaörs)
87	MF	FIN	Antonio Inutile (to (Finland) Pallokerho)
—	MF	HUN	Electo Wilson (loan to BKV Előre)

=== MTK Budapest FC ===
In: Note: Flags indicate national team as defined under FIFA eligibility rules; some limited exceptions apply. Players may hold more than one non-FIFA nationality.

No.	Pos.	Nation	Player
2	DF	HUN	Tibor Nagy (loan return from Szigetszentmiklós)
4	DF	HUN	Sándor Hidvégi (from Zalaegerszeg)
10	MF	HUN	János Lázok (from (Germany) MSV Duisburg)
13	FW	HUN	Ádám Hrepka (loan return from Paksi SE)
20	FW	HUN	Ferenc Rácz (from Kozármisleny)
31	FW	HUN	Balázs Batizi-Pócsi (from Nyíregyháza)
91	FW	HUN	Ádám Balajti (loan from Debrecen)
—	FW	HUN	Roland Frőhlich (loan from Pécs)

Out: Note: Flags indicate national team as defined under FIFA eligibility rules; some limited exceptions apply. Players may hold more than one non-FIFA nationality.

No.	Pos.	Nation	Player
3	MF	HUN	Sándor Hajdú (to Csákvár)
6	DF	HUN	András Gál (to Siófok)
10	MF	HUN	János Lázok (to Paks)
13	DF	HUN	Adrián Szekeres (to Videoton)
21	FW	HUN	Marcell Molnár (loan to Siófok)
27	FW	HUN	Richárd Frank (loan to Tatabánya)
91	FW	HUN	Ádám Balajti (loan return to Debrecen)

=== Paksi SE ===
In: Note: Flags indicate national team as defined under FIFA eligibility rules; some limited exceptions apply. Players may hold more than one non-FIFA nationality.

No.	Pos.	Nation	Player
2	MF	HUN	István Nagy (loan return from Siófok)
20	FW	HUN	János Lázok (from MTK Budapest)
21	MF	HUN	Gábor Bori (from Kecskemét)
27	MF	HUN	Norbert Heffler (loan return from Siófok)
33	DF	HUN	József Zsók (from Kaposvár)
55	FW	HUN	Attila Tököli (from Kecskemét)
77	MF	HUN	Dávid Kulcsár (from Ferencváros)
87	FW	HUN	Barnabás Vári (loan return from Szolnok)
91	FW	HUN	Zsolt Haraszti (loan return from Siófok)
99	FW	HUN	Attila Simon (from Siófok)

Out: Note: Flags indicate national team as defined under FIFA eligibility rules; some limited exceptions apply. Players may hold more than one non-FIFA nationality.

No.	Pos.	Nation	Player
2	MF	HUN	István Nagy (loan to Szolnok)
5	DF	HUN	Zsolt Gévay (to Gyirmót)
8	FW	HUN	Roland Bohner (loan to Szolnok)
13	MF	HUN	Dániel Böde (to Ferencváros)
17	FW	HUN	József Magasföldi (to Gyirmót)
20	FW	HUN	Ádám Hrepka (loan return to MTK Budapest)
29	MF	HUN	Gábor Tamási (loan to Szolnok)
32	MF	HUN	Lóránd Szatmári (loan return to (Italy) Reggina)
53	FW	HUN	Tibor Montvai (to Nyíregyháza)
87	FW	HUN	Barnabás Vári (loan to Szolnok)
87	FW	HUN	Roland Pap (to Vác)
91	FW	HUN	Zsolt Haraszti (to Videoton)
—	GK	HUN	Máté Kiss (loan to Veszprém)
—	MF	HUN	Donát Laczkovich (to Sopron)

=== Pécsi Mecsek FC ===
In: Note: Flags indicate national team as defined under FIFA eligibility rules; some limited exceptions apply. Players may hold more than one non-FIFA nationality.

No.	Pos.	Nation	Player
2	FW	HUN	Roland Frőhlich (from MTK Budapest)
5	DF	HUN	Ferenc Fodor (loan return from Kozármisleny)
6	DF	CIV	Jean-Baptiste Akassou (from Budapest Honvéd)
7	MF	HUN	Dávid Wittrédi (from Kozármisleny)
8	DF	SVN	Leon Panikvar (from Zalaegerszeg)
8	DF	HUN	Attila Pintér (loan return from Kozármisleny)
9	FW	SRB	Miroslav Grumić (from Kaposvár)
11	FW	SVK	Zoltán Harsányi (from (Slovakia) Dunajská Streda)
13	MF	HUN	Lóránd Szatmári (from (Italy) Reggina)
13	MF	HUN	Dávid Pákolicz (loan return from Nyíregyháza)
16	GK	ROU	András Sánta (from Budapest Honvéd)
17	MF	HUN	Adrián Horváth (from Budapest Honvéd)
19	FW	HUN	Szabolcs Gyánó (loan return from Kozármisleny)
22	DF	HUN	László Bodnár (from (Austria) Salzburg)
25	DF	CZE	Jiří Krejčí (from (Czech Republic) Příbram)
27	MF	HUN	István Eszlátyi (loan return from BKV Előre)
33	MF	NGA	Eke Uzoma (from (Germany) 1860 München)
47	GK	HUN	Péter Molnár (from Szombathely)

Out: Note: Flags indicate national team as defined under FIFA eligibility rules; some limited exceptions apply. Players may hold more than one non-FIFA nationality.

No.	Pos.	Nation	Player
2	FW	HUN	Roland Frőhlich (loan to Kozármisleny)
3	DF	BIH	Vlado Marković (to (Bosnia and Herzegovina) Čelik Zenica)
4	DF	HUN	József Nagy (loan to Kozármisleny)
5	MF	GHA	Samuel Ato (to Pálhalma)
6	MF	CRO	Goran Paracki (to (Croatia) Split)
8	DF	HUN	Attila Pintér (to Sopron)
9	FW	HUN	Péter Andorka (to Szombathely)
13	MF	HUN	Dávid Pákolicz (to Nyíregyháza)
17	DF	HUN	Csaba Regedei (to Gyirmót)
19	FW	HUN	Szabolcs Gyánó (to Sopron)
21	MF	MNE	Marko Šćepanović (to (Montenegro) Mladost Podgorica)
27	MF	HUN	István Eszlátyi (to BKV Előre)
28	DF	SRB	Nenad Todorović (to (Serbia) Novi Pazar)
31	GK	HUN	Ádám Holczer (to Gyirmót)
33	MF	GEO	Irakli Kvekveskiri (to (Georgia (country)) Dinamo Batumi)
36	DF	SRB	Marko Marović (to (Romania) Recaş)
61	DF	HUN	Gábor Simonfalvi (to Zalaegerszeg)

=== Szombathelyi Haladás ===
In: Note: Flags indicate national team as defined under FIFA eligibility rules; some limited exceptions apply. Players may hold more than one non-FIFA nationality.

No.	Pos.	Nation	Player
3	DF	HUN	Zoltán Fehér (from Győr)
9	FW	HUN	Péter Andorka (from Pécs)
11	MF	HUN	Ignác Irhás (loan return from Mezőkövesd)
17	FW	HUN	Attila Simon (loan return from Sopron)
46	MF	HUN	Ádám Simon (loan from (Italy) Palermo)

Out: Note: Flags indicate national team as defined under FIFA eligibility rules; some limited exceptions apply. Players may hold more than one non-FIFA nationality.

No.	Pos.	Nation	Player
7	MF	HUN	András Horváth (to Sopron)
9	FW	HUN	Márton Oross (to Gyirmót)
11	MF	HUN	Ignác Irhás (to Mezőkövesd)
16	FW	HUN	Máté Skriba (loan to Tatabánya)
17	FW	HUN	Attila Simon (to Nyíregyháza)
18	MF	HUN	Norbert Sipos (to Siófok)
24	FW	MNE	Goran Vujović (loan return to Videoton)
29	MF	SVK	Marián Sluka (to Siófok)

=== Újpest FC ===
In: Note: Flags indicate national team as defined under FIFA eligibility rules; some limited exceptions apply. Players may hold more than one non-FIFA nationality.

No.	Pos.	Nation	Player
4	MF	SRB	Filip Stanisavljević (from (Serbia) Javor Ivanjica)
5	DF	ITA	Alessandro Iandoli (from (Belgium) St. Truiden)
6	DF	HUN	Zoltán Takács (loan return from Vasas)
8	DF	HUN	Zoltán Szélesi (from (Netherlands) Nijmegen)
11	FW	ISR	Yadin Zaris (loan from (Belgium) Standard Liège)
15	DF	HUN	Tamás Rubus (loan return from Vasas)
17	DF	ESP	José María Antón (from (Austria) Salzburg)
18	MF	FRA	Grégory Christ (from (Belgium) St. Truiden)
31	FW	HUN	Bence Szabó (loan return from Vasas)
32	FW	COD	Bavon Tshibuabua (from (Belgium) Beerschot)
32	MF	HUN	Tamás Egerszegi (loan return from Siófok)
34	DF	BEL	Naïm Aarab (from (Greece) AEL)

Out: Note: Flags indicate national team as defined under FIFA eligibility rules; some limited exceptions apply. Players may hold more than one non-FIFA nationality.

No.	Pos.	Nation	Player
2	DF	HUN	Marcell Fodor (loan to Siófok)
5	DF	HUN	Zoltán Kiss (to Békéscsaba)
9	FW	SRB	Nikon Jevtić (to (Poland) Korona Kielce)
17	MF	HUN	István Bognár (to Mezőkövesd)
18	MF	MNE	Darko Marković (to (Montenegro) Lovćen)
20	MF	HUN	Patrik Nagy (to Kecskemét)
25	DF	HUN	Gábor Dvorschák (to (Germany) FC Carl Zeiss Jena)
30	FW	HUN	Balázs Zamostny (loan to Siófok)
32	MF	HUN	Tamás Egerszegi (loan to Siófok)
32	MF	TOG	Henri Eninful (loan return to (Belgium) Standard Liège)
34	DF	HUN	Zoltán Lipták (to Győr)

=== Videoton FC ===
In: Note: Flags indicate national team as defined under FIFA eligibility rules; some limited exceptions apply. Players may hold more than one non-FIFA nationality.

No.	Pos.	Nation	Player
7	FW	BRA	Paraiba (from (Brazil) Londrina)
7	MF	HUN	Dénes Szakály (loan return from Zalaegerszeg)
10	MF	BRA	Renato Neto (loan from (Portugal) Sporting)
13	GK	HUN	Bence Somodi (loan return from Gyirmót)
16	MF	POR	Filipe Oliveira (from (Italy) Parma)
18	FW	MNE	Goran Vujović (loan return from Szombathely)
19	FW	HUN	László Lencse (loan return from Kecskemét)
21	DF	HUN	Adrián Szekeres (from MTK Budapest)
22	DF	CPV	Stopira (from (Portugal) Feirense)
23	DF	BRA	Kaká (from (Germany) Hertha BSC)
24	MF	HUN	András Fejes (loan return from Siófok)
25	MF	HUN	Ákos Elek (loan return from (Turkey) Eskisehirspor)
88	FW	HUN	Zsolt Haraszti (loan return from Siófok)

Out: Note: Flags indicate national team as defined under FIFA eligibility rules; some limited exceptions apply. Players may hold more than one non-FIFA nationality.

No.	Pos.	Nation	Player
1	GK	SRB	Filip Pajović (loan to Puskás)
5	DF	GRE	Vassilios Apostolopoulos (loan to Puskás)
7	MF	BRA	Jeff Silva (loan to Diósgyőr)
7	MF	HUN	Dénes Szakály (loan to Puskás)
8	FW	SRB	Milan Perić (loan to Ferencváros)
8	MF	HUN	Attila Polonkai (to Puskás FC)
9	FW	POR	Evandro Brandão (to (Portugal) Olhanense)
10	FW	HUN	András Gosztonyi (to Diósgyőr)
16	MF	POR	Filipe Oliveira (loan return to (Italy) Parma)
18	FW	MNE	Goran Vujović (to Eger)
19	FW	HUN	László Lencse (to (Israel) Ironi Shmona)
23	DF	HUN	Tamás Vaskó (to Kecskemét)
24	MF	HUN	András Fejes (loan to Siófok)
25	MF	HUN	Ákos Elek (to Diósgyőr)
