= Dušan Nulíček =

Czech footballer

Personal information
- Full name: Dušan Nulíček
- Date of birth: 2 June 1988 (age 38)
- Place of birth: Jablonec nad Nisou, Czechoslovakia
- Height: 1.90 m (6 ft 3 in)
- Position: Striker

Team information
- Current team: Loko Vltavín

Youth career
- Baumit Jablonec

Senior career*
Years	Team	Apps	(Gls)
2006–2012	Baumit Jablonec	27	(3)
2008–2009	→ Zenit Čáslav (loan)	?	(?)
2010	Andria BAT	10	(1)
2013	DAC Dunajská Streda	24	(4)
2014–	Loko Vltavín	5	(1)

International career^{‡}
2005–2006	Czech Republic U18	9	(1)
2006–2007	Czech Republic U19	5	(0)
- * Club domestic league appearances and goals as of 9 May 2014 ‡ National team caps and goals as of 9 May 2014

Dušan Nulíček (born 2 June 1988) is a Czech football forward who currently plays for Loko Vltavín.
