= Matías Porcari =

Argentine footballer

Personal information
- Full name: Matías Sebastián Porcari
- Date of birth: 12 April 1986 (age 40)
- Place of birth: Laguna Larga, Argentina
- Height: 1.75 m (5 ft 9 in)
- Position: Attacking midfielder

Team information
- Current team: 9 de Julio

Youth career
- 1999– 2003: Belgrano de Cordoba

Senior career*
Years	Team	Apps	(Gls)
2003–2008	Belgrano de Cordoba	37	(3)
2007–2008	→ CAI (loan)	17	(0)
2008–2012	Fénix	22	(1)
2009–2010	→ Danubio (loan)	14	(1)
2012–2013	Budapest Honvéd	2	(0)
2012–2013	→ Budapest Honvéd II	8	(2)
2013	Progreso	6	(0)
2013–2014	Radnički Kragujevac	2	(0)
2014–2015	Juventud	27	(2)
2015	Olimpo	12	(0)
2016	Potros de Barinas		
2017–	9 de Julio	5	(1)
- * Club domestic league appearances and goals as of 1 January 2016

Matías Sebastián Porcari (born April 12, 1986) is an Argentine football midfielder playing for 9 de Julio de Río Tercero.

== Career ==
=== Beginning ===
Born in Laguna Larga, Córdoba Province, Argentina, Porcari had an great beginning. He debuted for the seniors of Belgrano de Cordoba in 2003 and by 2004 he was their established number 10. He ended up being one of the talents of Córdoba Province. He joined the club when he was 13. After debuting for the seniors, coach Marcelo Bonetto was so impressed that said that Belgrano was Porcari plus 10 more players.

=== Move to Uruguay ===
By the own words of Porcari, he left Belgrano at his best age because of some personal problems. After a season on loan at CAI, he decided to accept a move abroad to Uruguay and signed with Fénix. With Porcari as playmaker, Fenix managed to become champions of the Uruguayan Segunda División for 2008–09. This immediately called the attention of Uruguayan Primera División side Danubio which brought Porcari on loan for the 2009–10 season where he played along Álvaro Recoba. However, with Fénix already playing top-level, they brought back Porcari to their squad and he played with Fénix in Uruguayan top-league seasons 2010–11 and first half of 2011–12. At that time many European clubs had already noticed Porcari, and the fact that he hold Italian passport, thus could play as EU player, also helped.

=== Europe ===
The first European experience for Porcari happened during winter break of the 2011–12 season when he was loaned to Hungarian top-league side Budapest Honvéd. The experience had no major impact in his career as he made only two Nemzeti Bajnokság I (Hungarian top-league) appearances, and played more for the reserves team. As soon as the season ended, Porcari left and returned to Uruguay in summer 2013 by signing with Progreso and playing with them the entire 2012–13 Uruguayan Primera División season. Following summer, Serbian newly promoted top-league club Radnički Kragujevac decided to give him a chance and brought him, but only two appearances in the first half-season of the 2013–14 Serbian SuperLiga made the club and Porcari come to an easy mutual agreement of termination of contract.

=== Return to South America ===
After returning from Serbia, Porcari joined Uruguayan top-flight side Juventud where he stayed a full year, from January 2014 to January 2015. Then, he returned to Argentina where he played with Olimpo until January 2016. Then in 2016 he joined a Venezuelan club, Potros de Barinas. He stayed in Venezuela for almost one year. Afterwards, he played with 9 de Julio de Río Tercero.
