= Marko Rajić =

Croatian coach

Personal information
- Date of birth: 30 July 1991 (age 35)
- Place of birth: Pula, SFR Yugoslavia
- Height: 1.90 m (6 ft 3 in)
- Position: Forward

Team information
- Current team: Kačer Belanovica

Youth career
- Zemun
- Čukarički

Senior career*
Years	Team	Apps	(Gls)
2009	Čukarički	14	(0)
2010–2011	Sopot		
2012	Mladenovac	9	(2)
2012–2013	Honvéd II	4	(2)
2014	Teleoptik	4	(0)
2014	Stomil Olsztyn	0	(0)
2014	Sinđelić Beograd	12	(0)
2015	Hibernians	6	(0)
2016	Bežanija	9	(0)
2016–2019	OFK Žarkovo	43	(15)
2019–2023	Prva Iskra Barič		
2023-	Kačer Belanovica		
- * Club domestic league appearances and goals as of 11 September 2018

Marko Rajić (Serbian Cyrillic: Марко Рајић; born 30 July 1991) is a Serbian footballer who plays as a forward.

== Honours ==
Hibernians

- Maltese Premier League: 2014–15
