= Filip Kostić (footballer, born 1993) =

Serbian footballer (born 1993)

Personal information
- Full name: Filip Kostić
- Date of birth: 8 October 1993 (age 33)
- Place of birth: Loznica, FR Yugoslavia
- Height: 1.89 m (6 ft 2 1/2 in)
- Position: Striker

Team information
- Current team: 1. FC Bisamberg

Senior career*
Years	Team	Apps	(Gls)
–2011	Loznica		
2012	Radnički Stobex		
2012	Honvéd II	8	(1)
2012	Honvéd	0	(0)
2013	Javor Ivanjica	9	(0)
2013–2014	Mladost Obarska	27	(4)
2014–2015	Drina Zvornik	15	(3)
2015	Podrinje Janja		
2016	FC Stadlau	1	(0)
2016–2017	SC Süssenbrunn	29	(20)
2017–2019	Favoritner AC	57	(17)
2019–2020	1.FC Bisamberg	13	(4)
2020–2021	ASK Elektra	13	(3)
2021–2022	SR Donaufeld	30	(7)
2022–2024	Hollabrunn ATSV	52	(33)
2025–	1. FC Bisamberg	0	(0)
- * Club domestic league appearances and goals as of 23:08, 29 December 2024 (UTC)

Filip Kostić (Serbian Cyrillic: Филип Костић; born 8 October 1993) is a Serbian football striker who plays for 1. FC Bisamberg in Austria.

At the moment Filip is playing in Austria, amateur football. Last few seasons he played for FC Stadlau, SC Süsenbrunn, FavAC and FC Bisamberg. He also studies Art History on the University of Vienna.
