= Aleksandar Ignjatović =

Serbian footballer (born 1988)

Personal information
- Date of birth: 11 April 1988 (age 38)
- Place of birth: Niš, SFR Yugoslavia
- Height: 1.92 m (6 ft 3 1/2 in)
- Position: Centre-back

Youth career
- –2006: Radnički Niš

Senior career*
Years	Team	Apps	(Gls)
2006–2008	Radnički Niš	57	(0)
2008–2012	Borac Čačak	72	(1)
2009	→ Feyenoord (loan)	0	(0)
2012–2016	Honvéd Budapest	93	(6)
2016	Radnički Niš	8	(0)
2017	Bunyodkor	0	(0)
2017	Novi Pazar	16	(2)
2017–2019	Sloboda Tuzla	60	(2)
2019–2022	Laçi	87	(2)
2022–2023	RoundGlass Punjab	19	(0)
2023–2024	Rudar Prijedor	16	(1)
2024–2025	Sloboda Tuzla	25	(1)
2025—	Buducnost Popovac	0	(0)

International career
2009	Serbia U21	2	(0)
- * Club domestic league appearances and goals as of 7 October 2025

Aleksandar Ignjatović (Serbian Cyrillic: Александар Игњатовић; born 11 April 1988) is a Serbian professional footballer who plays as a defender.

== Club career ==
Ignjatović started his career in the youth squads of Radnicki Nis, a club playing in the Serbian First League. In the season 2006–07, he made his first appearance in the club's first team and quickly became a regular starter in the Radnički line-up. After two successful seasons Ignjatović earned a transfer to FK Borac Čačak.

In the summer of 2008, Ignjatović joined Borac Čačak, making his debut on the highest level in Serbia, the Serbian SuperLiga. On 17 July 2008, he made his official European debut in the UEFA Cup first qualifying round match against FC Dacia Chişinău.

On 26 June 2009, the Dutch club Feyenoord announced the arrival of Borac Čačak defender Ignjatović on a season-long loan, with a view to a permanent deal. However, the towering defender failed to make an impression at the Rotterdam side. Ignjatović didn't play a single match for Feyenoord and returned to Borac Čačak during the winter transfer period.

=== RoundGlass Punjab ===
In September 2022, I-League club RoundGlass Punjab announced the signing of Ignjatović, on a one-year deal.

== International career ==
Ignjatović made his international debut for the Serbia U21 squad in a friendly match against Cyprus U21 on 11 February 2009.

== Club statistics ==
=== Club ===
As of 6 December 2024

Club	Season	League			National Cup		League Cup		Continental		Total	
Club	Season	Division	Apps	Goals	Apps	Goals	Apps	Goals	Apps	Goals	Apps	Goals
Radnički Niš	2006–07	Serbian First League	26	0	0	0	0	0	—		26	0
Radnički Niš	2007–08	Serbian First League	31	0	0	0	0	0	—		31	0
Radnički Niš	Total		57	0	0	0	0	0	0	0	57	0
Borac Čačak	2008–09	Serbian SuperLiga	29	0	0	0	0	0	6 (Note: Appearance(s) in UEFA Europa League)	0	35	0
Borac Čačak	2009–10	Serbian SuperLiga	7	0	0	0	0	0	—		7	0
Borac Čačak	2010–11	Serbian SuperLiga	21	1	1 (Note: Appearance(s) in Serbian Cup)	0	0	0	—		22	1
Borac Čačak	2011–12	Serbian SuperLiga	15	0	2	0	0	0	—		17	0
Borac Čačak	Total		72	1	3	0	0	0	6	0	81	1
Feyenoord (loan)	2009–10	Eredivisie	0	0	0	0	0	0	—		0	0
Budapest Honvéd	2012–13	NB I	29	1	4 (Note: Appearance(s) in Hungarian Cup)	1	3 (Note: Appearance(s) in Hungarian League Cup)	0	4	0	40	2
Budapest Honvéd	2013–14	NB I	27	2	2	0	2	0	4	0	35	2
Budapest Honvéd	2014–15	NB I	23	2	1	0	5	1	—		29	3
Budapest Honvéd	2015–16	NB I	14	1	2	0	0	0	—		16	1
Budapest Honvéd	Total		93	6	9	1	10	1	8	0	120	8
Radnički Niš	2016–17	Serbian SuperLiga	8	0	1	0	0	0	—		9	0
Novi Pazar	2016–17	Serbian SuperLiga	16	2	0	0	0	0	—		16	2
Sloboda Tuzla	2017–18	Premijer Liga	31	2	6 (Note: Appearance(s) in Bosnia and Herzegovina Football Cup)	0	0	0	—		37	2
Sloboda Tuzla	2018–19	Premijer Liga	29	0	1	0	0	0	—		30	0
Sloboda Tuzla	Total		60	2	7	0	0	0	0	0	67	2
Laçi	2019–20	Kategoria Superiore	34	2	2 (Note: Appearance(s) in Albanian Cup)	0	0	0	2	0	38	2
Laçi	2020–21	Kategoria Superiore	31	0	3	0	0	0	2	0	36	0
Laçi	2021–22	Kategoria Superiore	22	0	6	0	0	0	6 (Note: Appearance(s) in UEFA Europa Conference League)	0	34	0
Laçi	Total		87	2	11	0	0	0	10	0	108	2
RoundGlass Punjab	2022–23	I-League	19	0	0	0	2 (Note: Appearance(s) in Super Cup)	0	—		21	0
Rudar Prijedor	2023-24	Prva Liga RS	16	1	—		1	0	—		17	1
FK Sloboda Tuzla	2024-25	Premijer Liga	18	1	—		—		—		18	1
Career total			446	15	31	1	13	1	24	0	514	17
