= András Sánta =

Romanian footballer

Personal information
- Full name: András Sánta
- Date of birth: 1 June 1985 (age 41)
- Place of birth: Braşov, Romania
- Height: 1.87 m (6 ft 1 1/2 in)
- Position: Goalkeeper

Team information
- Current team: Szigetszentmiklós
- Number: 1

Youth career
- 2003–2005: Braşov

Senior career*
Years	Team	Apps	(Gls)
2004–2005	Hévíz	5	(0)
2005–2008	Gyirmót	90	(0)
2008	Siófok	1	(0)
2008–2009	Cegléd	28	(0)
2009–2011	Győr	2	(0)
2011–2012	Honvéd	8	(0)
2011–2012	→ Honvéd II	6	(0)
2012–2013	Pécs	1	(0)
2013–	Szigetszentmiklós	12	(0)
- * Club domestic league appearances and goals as of 24 November 2013

András Sánta (born 1 June 1985, in Braşov) is a Romanian football player of Hungarian ethnicity who currently plays for Soproni VSE.
