= Sergiu Moga =

Romanian footballer

Personal information
- Full name: Sergiu Ionuț Moga
- Date of birth: 7 January 1992 (age 34)
- Place of birth: Oradea, Romania
- Height: 1.85 m (6 ft 1 in)
- Position: Centre back

Team information
- Current team: SCM Zalău (fitness coach)

Youth career
- 2007–2011: Budapest Honvéd

Senior career*
Years	Team	Apps	(Gls)
2011–2014	Budapest Honvéd	4	(0)
2014	Viitorul Constanța	3	(0)
2014–2016	Voluntari	17	(1)
2016–2017	Luceafărul Oradea	19	(1)
2018–2021	Szeged-Csanád	56	(2)
2021–2022	Hajdúszoboszló	15	(1)
Total		114	(5)

International career
2011–2012	Romania U-19	5	(0)

Managerial career
- 2022–: SCM Zalău (fitness coach)
- * Club domestic league appearances and goals as of 17:23, 7 November 2022 (UTC)

Sergiu Ionuț Moga (born 7 January 1992) is a Romanian former footballer who played as a defender for clubs such as Budapest Honvéd, Voluntari, Luceafărul Oradea or Szeged-Csanád, among others.

== Club career ==
Moga was born on 7 January 1992 in Oradea. He began playing football at Bihor Oradea before joining Budapest Honvéd in 2007 at the age of 15, after being spotted by a Hungarian scout during a youth match. He progressed through the club's youth teams before playing for the reserve and senior sides.

He made his Nemzeti Bajnokság debut in February 2011, starting against MTK Budapest, but suffered a serious right knee injury involving the anterior cruciate and medial collateral ligaments. This followed a similar injury to his left knee a year earlier. After eight months of recovery, he returned to action and scored on his comeback. He subsequently made further appearances for Honvéd in the league, the Hungarian Cup and the Hungarian League Cup. During the 2012–13 season, he received several first-team opportunities under manager Marco Rossi.

In January 2014, Moga left Honvéd and joined Romanian club Viitorul Constanța, then competing in Liga I.

== Club statistics ==
Club	Season	League		Cup		League Cup		Europe		Total	
Club	Season	Apps	Goals	Apps	Goals	Apps	Goals	Apps	Goals	Apps	Goals
Honvéd
Honvéd	2010–11	1	0	0	0	0	0	0	0	1	0
Honvéd	2011–12	0	0	0	0	0	0	0	0	0	0
Honvéd	2012–13	3	0	2	0	4	0	0	0	9	0
Honvéd	2013–14	0	0	0	0	1	0	0	0	1	0
Honvéd	Total	4	0	2	0	5	0	0	0	11	0
Career Total		4	0	2	0	5	0	0	0	11	0

Updated to games played as of 4 September 2013.
