= Henry Odia =

Nigerian footballer

Personal information
- Full name: Henry Etiosa Odia
- Date of birth: 5 September 1990 (age 36)
- Place of birth: Benin City, Nigeria
- Height: 1.71 m (5 ft 7 1/2 in)
- Position: Midfielder

Team information
- Current team: Dacia Chișinău

Senior career*
Years	Team	Apps	(Gls)
2012–2013	Budapest Honvéd	3	(0)
2013–	Dacia Chișinău	2	(0)
- * Club domestic league appearances and goals as of 29 June 2013

Henry Odia (born 5 September 1990) is a Nigerian football player who currently plays for FC Dacia Chișinău.

== Club statistics ==
Club	Season	League		Cup		League Cup		Europe		Total	
Club	Season	Apps	Goals	Apps	Goals	Apps	Goals	Apps	Goals	Apps	Goals
Honvéd
Honvéd	2012–13	3	0	0	0	4	1	0	0	7	1
Honvéd	Total	3	0	0	0	4	1	0	0	7	1
Career Total		3	0	0	0	4	1	0	0	7	1

Updated to games played as of 5 December 2012.
