= Claudiu Pascariu =

Romanian association football player

Personal information
- Full name: Claudiu Dumitru Pascariu
- Date of birth: 25 October 1988 (age 38)
- Place of birth: Arad, Romania
- Height: 1.87 m (6 ft 1 1/2 in)
- Position: Centre back

Senior career*
Years	Team	Apps	(Gls)
2008–2012	UTA Arad	25	(2)
2012–2013	Târgu Mureș	7	(0)
2013	Budapest Honvéd	4	(1)
2014–2015	Bihor Oradea	25	(2)
2015–2016	Şoimii Pâncota	18	(1)
2016–2017	TuS Essen-West	6	(0)
2017–2018	Crișul Chișineu-Criș	?	(?)
- * Club domestic league appearances and goals as of 24 September 2018

Claudiu Dumitru Pascariu (born 25 October 1988) is a Romanian footballer who plays as a defender.

== Club statistics ==
Club	Season	League		Cup		League Cup		Europe		Total	
Club	Season	Apps	Goals	Apps	Goals	Apps	Goals	Apps	Goals	Apps	Goals
Arad
Arad	2011–12	10	0	0	0	0	0	0	0	10	0
Arad	Total	10	0	0	0	0	0	0	0	10	0
Târgu Mureș
Târgu Mureș	2012–13	4	0	3	0	0	0	0	0	7	0
Târgu Mureș	Total	4	0	3	0	0	0	0	0	7	0
Budapest Honvéd
Budapest Honvéd	2012–13	1	0	0	0	1	0	0	0	2	0
Budapest Honvéd	Total	1	0	0	0	1	0	0	0	2	0
Career Total		15	0	3	0	1	0	0	0	19	0

Updated to games played as of 3 March 2013.
