= Norbert Szemerédi =

Hungarian footballer

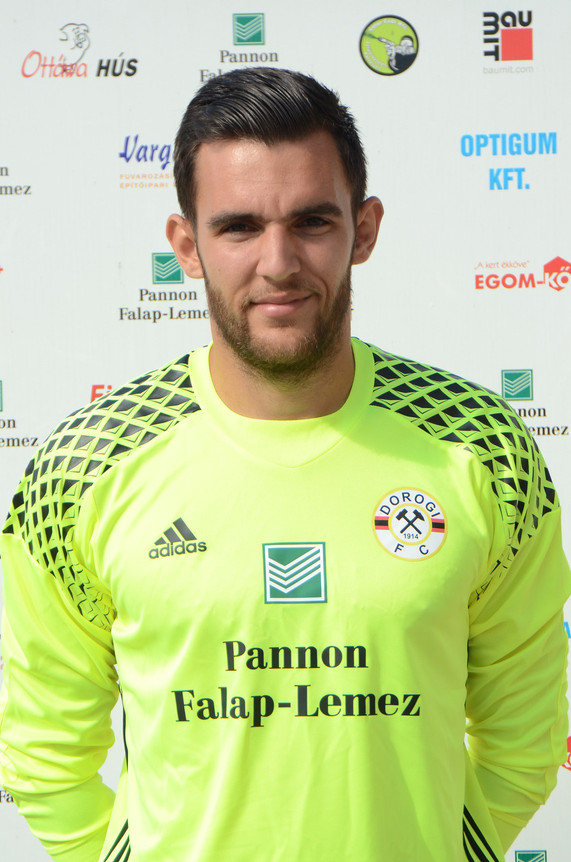
- Szemerédi in 2016

Personal information
- Full name: Norbert József Szemerédi
- Date of birth: 8 December 1993 (age 32)
- Place of birth: Szekszárd, Hungary
- Height: 1.92 m (6 ft 3 1/2 in)
- Position: Goalkeeper

Team information
- Current team: BVSC
- Number: 34

Youth career
- 2002–2007: Paks
- 2007–2012: Honvéd

Senior career*
Years	Team	Apps	(Gls)
2012–2016	Honvéd	1	(0)
2014–2015	→ Paks (loan)	0	(0)
2016–2017	Dorog	29	(0)
2017	Szeged	0	(0)
2017–2020	Zalaegerszeg	2	(0)
2020–2021	Kazincbarcika	3	(0)
2021–	BVSC		
- * Club domestic league appearances and goals as of 9 May 2021

Norbert József Szemerédi (born 8 December 1993) is a Hungarian football player who plays for BVSC.

== Career statistics ==
Appearances and goals by club, season and competition
Club	Season	League			Cup		League Cup		Europe		Total	
Club	Season	Division	Apps	Goals	Apps	Goals	Apps	Goals	Apps	Goals	Apps	Goals
Honvéd
Honvéd	2012–13	Nemzeti Bajnokság I	1	0	0	0	1	0	—		2	0
Honvéd	2013–14	Nemzeti Bajnokság I	0	0	0	0	2	0	—		2	0
Honvéd	Total		1	0	0	0	3	0	0	0	4	0
Paks	2014–15	Nemzeti Bajnokság I	0	0	0	0	4	0	—		4	0
Dorog
Dorog	2015–16	Nemzeti Bajnokság III	13	0	0	0	—		—		13	0
Dorog	2016–17	Nemzeti Bajnokság II	16	0	0	0	—		—		16	0
Dorog	Total		29	0	0	0	0	0	0	0	29	0
Zalaegerszeg
Zalaegerszeg	2017–18	Nemzeti Bajnokság II	0	0	3	0	—		—		3	0
Zalaegerszeg	2018–19	Nemzeti Bajnokság II	2	0	2	0	—		—		4	0
Zalaegerszeg	2019–20	Nemzeti Bajnokság I	0	0	3	0	—		—		3	0
Zalaegerszeg	Total		2	0	8	0	0	0	0	0	10	0
Career total			32	0	8	0	7	0	0	0	47	0

Updated to games played as of 4 March 2020.
