= Richárd Czár =

Hungarian footballer

Personal information
- Date of birth: 13 August 1992 (age 34)
- Place of birth: Komló, Hungary
- Height: 1.79 m (5 ft 10 1/2 in)
- Position: Defender

Team information
- Current team: Puskás Akadémia II

Youth career
- 2003–2004: Komló
- 2004–2006: Pécs
- 2006–2007: Ferencváros
- 2007: Pécs
- 2007–2010: Honvéd

Senior career*
Years	Team	Apps	(Gls)
2009–2015	Honvéd	13	(1)
2009–2012	→ Honvéd II	50	(0)
2012–2013	→ First Vienna (loan)	18	(0)
2013–2014	→ Sopron (loan)	6	(0)
2015–2016	Dunaújváros PASE	15	(1)
2016	FC Ajka	13	(2)
2016–2017	Mosonmagyaróvári TE	34	(6)
2017–2018	Gyirmót	13	(1)
2017–2018	→ Gyirmót II (loan)	9	(1)
2018–2019	Mosonmagyaróvári TE	16	(1)
2020–2021	Budaörsi	6	(0)
2021–	Puskás Akadémia II	16	(1)

International career
2010–2011	Hungary U-18	1	(0)
2011–2013	Hungary U-19	4	(0)
- * Club domestic league appearances and goals as of 10:15, 20 April 2022 (UTC)

Richárd Czár (born 13 August 1992) is a Hungarian football player who plays for Puskás Akadémia II.
