= Souleymane Diaby (footballer, born 1987) =

Ivorian footballer

Personal information
- Full name: Souleymane Diaby
- Date of birth: September 10, 1987 (age 39)
- Place of birth: Daloa, Ivory Coast
- Height: 1.90 m (6 ft 3 in)
- Position: Striker

Youth career
- Stella Club d'Adjamé

Senior career*
| Years | Team | Apps | (Gls) |
| 2004–2005 | Union de Mohammédia | 15 | (7) |
| 2005–2006 | Sabé Sports de Bouna | 20 | (10) |
| 2006–2007 | Africa Sports d'Abidjan | 13 | (7) |
| 2008–2010 | Krymteplytsia Molodizhne | 83 | (24) |
| 2011–2013 | Budapest Honvéd | 22 | (3) |
| 2014 | US Granville | | |
- * Club domestic league appearances and goals

Souleymane Diaby (born 10 September 1987) is an Ivorian footballer.

== Career ==
In 2007, Diaby joined Ukrainian club FC Krymteplytsia Molodizhne. In 2017, he joined the Ivorian Club, SC Gagnoa.

== Club statistics ==
| Club | Season | League | | Cup | | League Cup | | Europe | | Total | |
| Club | Season | Apps | Goals | Apps | Goals | Apps | Goals | Apps | Goals | Apps | Goals |
|---|---|---|---|---|---|---|---|---|---|---|---|
Molodizhne
| Molodizhne | 2007–08 | 13 | 3 | 0 | 0 | 0 | 0 | 0 | 0 | 13 | 3 |
| Molodizhne | 2008–09 | 28 | 9 | 2 | 1 | 0 | 0 | 0 | 0 | 29 | 10 |
| Molodizhne | 2009–10 | 24 | 11 | 3 | 1 | 0 | 0 | 0 | 0 | 27 | 12 |
| Molodizhne | 2010–11 | 18 | 1 | 2 | 0 | 0 | 0 | 0 | 0 | 20 | 1 |
| Total | | 83 | 24 | 7 | 2 | 0 | 0 | 0 | 0 | 90 | 26 |
Honvéd
| Honvéd | 2011–12 | 1 | 0 | 0 | 0 | 2 | 0 | 0 | 0 | 3 | 0 |
| Honvéd | 2012–13 | 18 | 3 | 1 | 0 | 2 | 1 | 4 | 0 | 25 | 4 |
| Honvéd | 2013–14 | 3 | 0 | 0 | 0 | 0 | 0 | 3 | 2 | 6 | 2 |
| Honvéd | Total | 22 | 3 | 1 | 0 | 4 | 1 | 7 | 2 | 34 | 6 |
| Career Total | | 105 | 27 | 8 | 2 | 4 | 1 | 7 | 2 | 124 | 32 |

Updated to games played as of 18 August 2013.
