= Mihály Csábi =

Hungarian footballer

Personal information
- Full name: Mihály Csábi
- Date of birth: 25 March 1995 (age 31)
- Place of birth: Budapest, Hungary
- Height: 1.79 m (5 ft 10 in)
- Position: Midfielder

Team information
- Current team: Honvéd
- Number: 16

Youth career
- 2004–2010: Ferencváros
- 2010–2013: Honvéd

Senior career*
Years	Team	Apps	(Gls)
2013–	Honvéd	9	(0)
- * Club domestic league appearances and goals as of 6 May 2016

Mihály Csábi (born 25 March 1995 in Budapest) is a Hungarian professional footballer who plays for Budapest Honvéd FC. He is the son of former player József Csábi who also spent most of career with Honvéd and earned several caps in the Hungary national team and subsequently worked as assistant coach for both Honvéd and the Hungary national team.

== Club statistics ==
Appearances and goals by club, season and competition
Club	Season	League			Cup		League Cup		Europe		Total	
Club	Season	Division	Apps	Goals	Apps	Goals	Apps	Goals	Apps	Goals	Apps	Goals
Honvéd	2013–14	Nemzeti Bajnokság I	4	0	2	1	4	0	0	0	10	1
Career total			4	0	2	1	4	0	0	0	10	1

Updated to games played as of 1 June 2014.
