= Marshal Johnson =

Nigerian footballer

Personal information
- Full name: Marshal Mfon Johnson
- Date of birth: 12 December 1989 (age 36)
- Place of birth: Uyo, Nigeria
- Height: 1.88 m (6 ft 2 in)
- Position: Midfielder

Team information
- Current team: Banjole

Youth career
- 2000–2005: Akwa United

Senior career*
Years	Team	Apps	(Gls)
2006–2009	Akwa United	86	(9)
2009–2012	Union Saint-Gilloise	29	(2)
2010–2011	→ KAS Eupen (loan)	3	(0)
2011–2012	→ Honvéd II (loan)	9	(1)
2011–2012	→ Honvéd (loan)	15	(0)
2012–2013	Honvéd	12	(1)
2014–2016	Gorica	50	(3)
2016	Al-Fujairah		
2016–2017	Al Urooba		
2017–2018	Hapoel Afula		
2018	Pyunik	4	(0)
2020–2021	Akwa United		
2022	Uljanik Pula	10	(0)
2022–2024	Opatija	35	(1)
2024–2026	Buje	39	(2)
2026–	Banjole		
- * Club domestic league appearances and goals as of 16 July 2026

Marshal Mfon Johnson (born 12 December 1989) is a Nigerian footballer who plays for NK Banjole.

== Career ==
Johnson began his career with Akwa United F.C. and joined on 26 May 2009 to Belgium club R. Union Saint-Gilloise who signed a two-year contract. On 24 September 2010 left R. Union Saint-Gilloise and signed with KAS Eupen.

In the summer of 2011, Johnson signed for Honvéd on loan. In March 2018, Johnson signed a one-year contract with Armenian Premier League club FC Pyunik.
