= Mamadou Diakité (footballer) =

Footballer (born 1985)

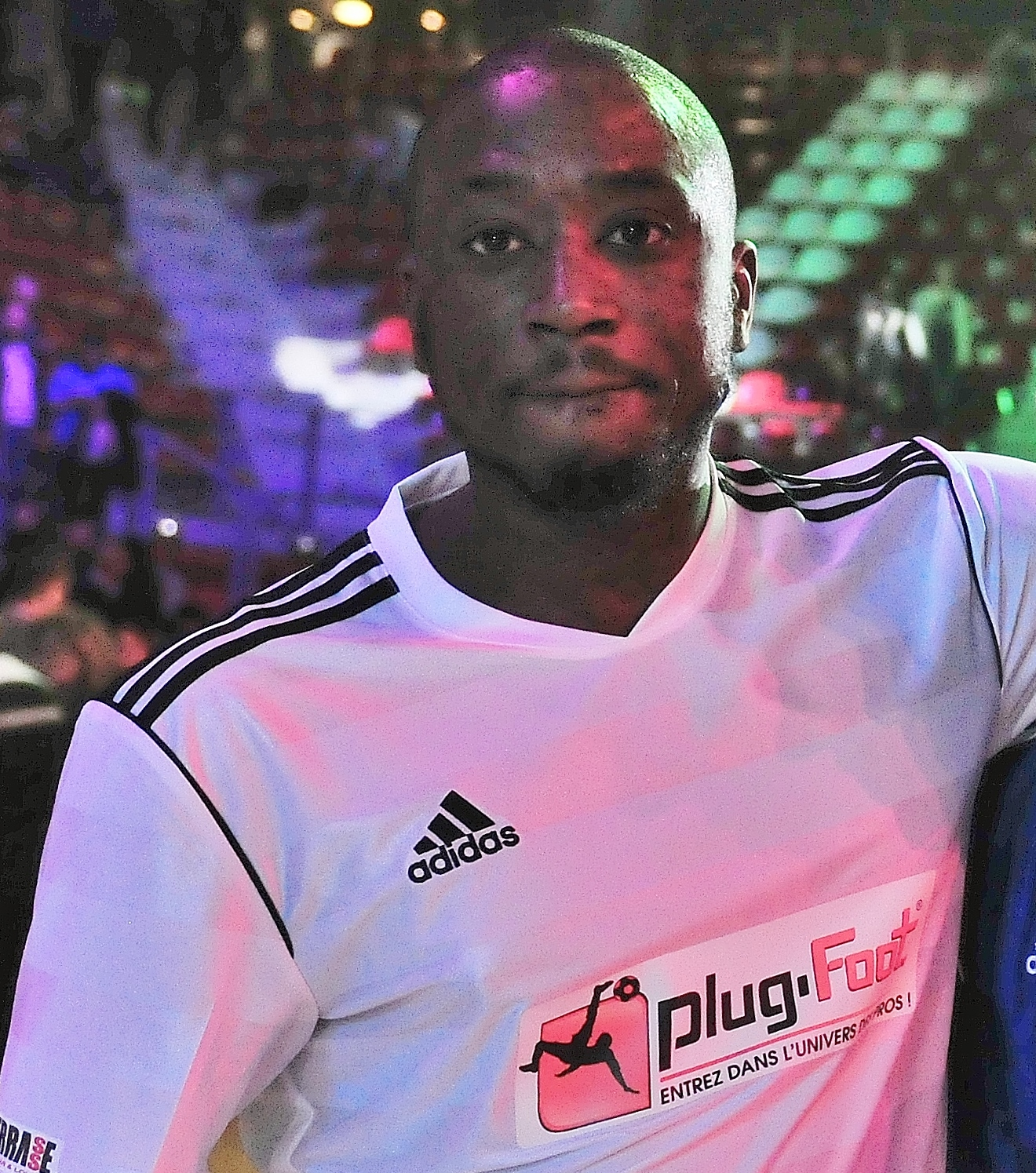

Personal information
- Date of birth: 22 May 1985 (age 41)
- Place of birth: Rosny-sous-Bois, France
- Height: 1.86 m (6 ft 1 in)
- Position: Defensive midfielder

Youth career
- Metz

Senior career*
Years	Team	Apps	(Gls)
2003–2004	Metz B	51	(3)
2004–2008	Metz	8	(0)
2005–2006	→ Vitória (loan)	1	(0)
2008–2010	Mouscron	25	(0)
2010–2011	Al Ahli	3	(0)
2011–2012	ASC Ksar		
2012–2013	Honvéd	1	(0)
2012–2013	Honvéd II	5	(1)
2013–2014	Crotone	0	(0)

International career
2009	Mali	1	(0)
- * Club domestic league appearances and goals

Mamadou Diakité (born 22 May 1985) is a former professional footballer who played as a defensive midfielder. Born in France, he made one appearance for the Mali national team in 2009.

== Career ==
Diakité previously played for Al Ahli in Qatar, and previously played for FC Metz and R.E. Mouscron.

Diakité made one appearance for the Mali national team, in a friendly against Burkina Faso on 12 August 2009.
