= Gergely Délczeg =

Hungarian footballer

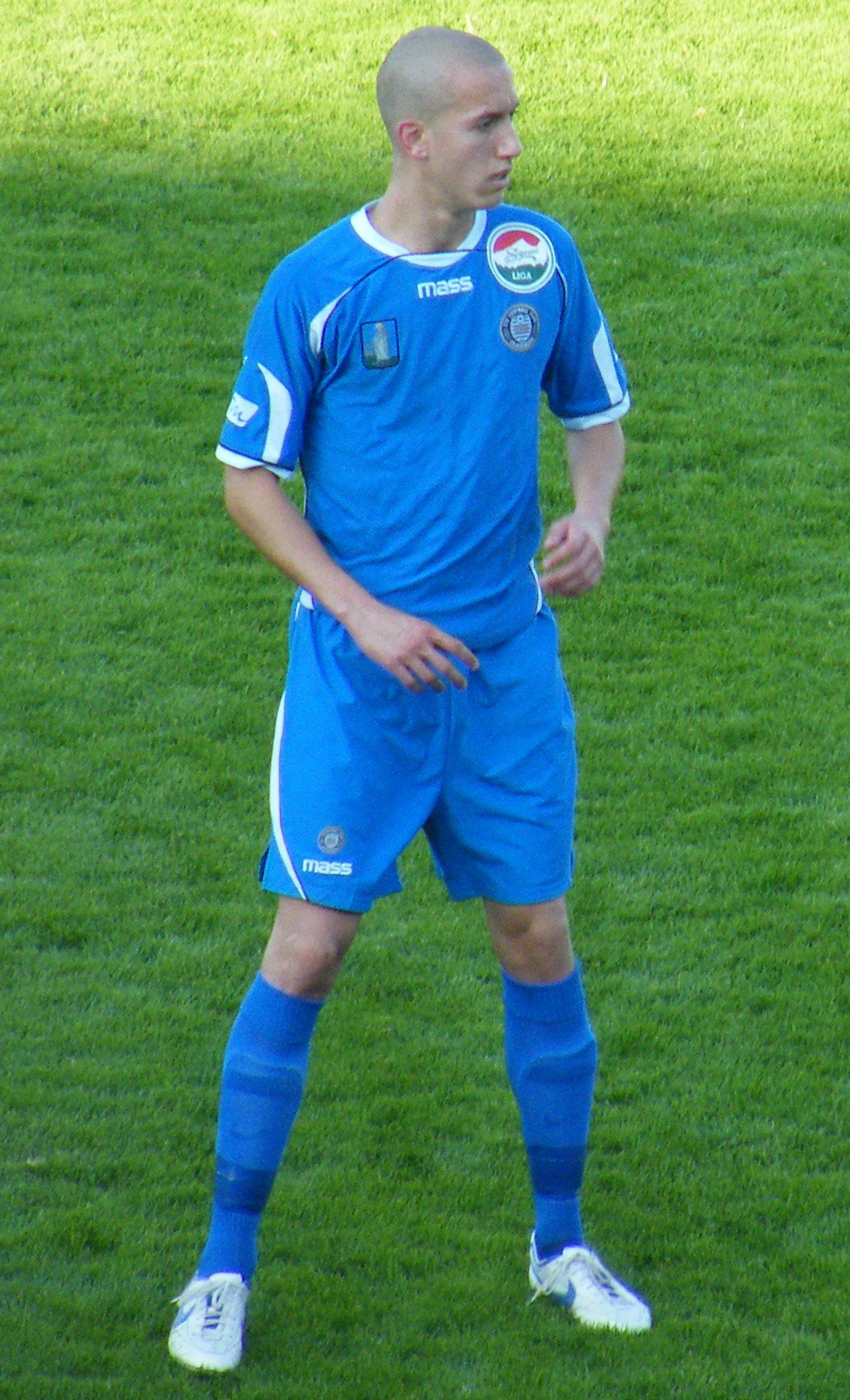
- Gergely Délczeg

Personal information
- Date of birth: 9 August 1987 (age 39)
- Place of birth: Budapest, Hungary
- Height: 1.89 m (6 ft 2 in)
- Position: Forward

Youth career
- 2002–2006: Rákospalota

Senior career*
Years	Team	Apps	(Gls)
2006–2008	Rákospalota	2	(0)
2008–2009	Zalaegerszeg	2	(0)
2009–2011	Siófok	51	(19)
2011–2016	Budapest Honvéd	52	(14)
2013	→ Paks (loan)	16	(1)
2014–2015	→ Zalaegerszeg (loan)	28	(11)
2016–2018	Kisvárda	33	(8)
2018–2019	Kisvárda II	4	(2)
2019–2021	Dorog	25	(10)
2021–2022	Haladás	8	(0)
- * Club domestic league appearances and goals

Gergely Délczeg (born 9 August 1987) is a Hungarian former professional footballer.

== Career statistics ==
Appearances and goals by club, season and competition
Club	Season	League			Cup		League Cup		Europe		Total	
Club	Season	Division	Apps	Goals	Apps	Goals	Apps	Goals	Apps	Goals	Apps	Goals
Rákospalota
Rákospalota	2006–07	Nemzeti Bajnokság I	2	0	0	0	0	0	0	0	2	0
Rákospalota	2007–08	Nemzeti Bajnokság I	0	0	0	0	9	2	0	0	9	2
Rákospalota	Total		2	0	0	0	9	2	0	0	11	2
Zalaegerszeg	2008–09	Nemzeti Bajnokság I	2	0	0	0	4	0	0	0	6	0
Siófok
Siófok	2009–10	Nemzeti Bajnokság II	26	13	1	1	1	0	0	0	28	14
Siófok	2010–11	Nemzeti Bajnokság I	25	6	6	1	6	2	0	0	37	9
Siófok	Total		51	19	7	2	7	2	0	0	65	23
Honvéd
Honvéd	2011–12	Nemzeti Bajnokság I	26	4	0	0	4	2	0	0	30	6
Honvéd	2012–13	Nemzeti Bajnokság I	22	10	3	0	3	3	4	0	32	13
Honvéd	2013–14	Nemzeti Bajnokság I	1	0	0	0	0	0	4	2	5	2
Honvéd	Total		49	14	3	0	7	5	8	2	67	21
Paks	2013–14	Nemzeti Bajnokság I	15	1	1	0	6	5	0	0	22	6
Career total			119	34	11	2	33	14	8	2	171	52

Updated to games played as of 7 April 2014.
