= Boris Živanović =

Serbian footballer (born 1989)

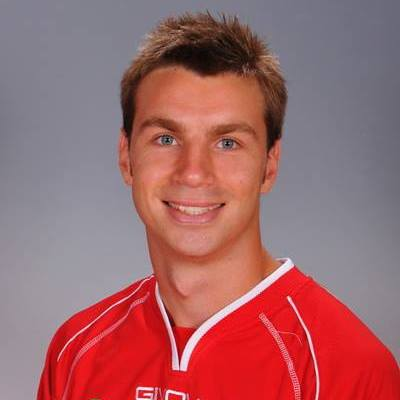
- Boris Zivanovic when playing for FC Honved

Personal information
- Full name: Boris Živanović
- Date of birth: 18 July 1989 (age 37)
- Place of birth: Belgrade, SFR Yugoslavia
- Height: 1.85 m (6 ft 1 in)
- Positions: Winger; attacking midfielder

Senior career*
| Years | Team | Apps | (Gls) |
| 2007–2009 | Zemun | 37 | (7) |
| 2009–2010 | Rad | 1 | (0) |
| 2010 | → Mačva Šabac (loan) | 17 | (6) |
| 2010–2011 | Radnički 1923 | 7 | (2) |
| 2011–2012 | Mačva Šabac | 32 | (15) |
| 2012–2014 | Honvéd Budapest | 36 | (5) |
| 2014–2015 | Nyíregyháza | 3 | (0) |
| 2015 | Pittsburgh Riverhounds | 11 | (1) |
| 2016 | Koper | 4 | (0) |
| 2016–2017 | Dunărea Călărași | 7 | (2) |
| 2017 | Borac Čačak | 10 | (0) |
| 2018 | Szeged 2011 | 12 | (3) |
- * Club domestic league appearances and goals as of 24 November 2018

Boris Živanović (Serbian Cyrillic: Борис Живановић; born 18 July 1989) is a Serbian footballer who most recently played for Szeged 2011. He has Serbian and Hungarian passport.

== Club statistics ==
| Club | Season | League | | Cup | | League Cup | | Europe | | Total | |
| Club | Season | Apps | Goals | Apps | Goals | Apps | Goals | Apps | Goals | Apps | Goals |
|---|---|---|---|---|---|---|---|---|---|---|---|
| Zemun | 2007–08 | 7 | 2 | 2 | 0 | 0 | 0 | 0 | 0 | 9 | 2 |
| Zemun | 2008–09 | 25 | 5 | 3 | 0 | 0 | 0 | 0 | 0 | 28 | 5 |
| Zemun | Total | 32 | 7 | 5 | 0 | 0 | 0 | 0 | 0 | 37 | 7 |
| Rad | 2009–10 | 1 | 0 | 0 | 0 | 0 | 0 | 0 | 0 | 1 | 0 |
| Mačva Šabac | 2010 | 15 | 5 | 2 | 1 | 0 | 0 | 0 | 0 | 17 | 6 |
| Radnički 1923 | 2010–11 | 7 | 2 | 0 | 0 | 0 | 0 | 0 | 0 | 7 | 2 |
| Mačva Šabac | 2011–12 | 30 | 14 | 2 | 1 | 0 | 0 | 0 | 0 | 32 | 15 |
| Honvéd | 2012–13 | 24 | 2 | 2 | 0 | 4 | 1 | 0 | 0 | 30 | 3 |
| Honvéd | 2013–14 | 12 | 3 | 0 | 0 | 0 | 0 | 4 | 0 | 16 | 3 |
| Honvéd | Total | 36 | 5 | 2 | 0 | 4 | 1 | 4 | 0 | 46 | 6 |
| Nyíregyháza | 2014–15 | 5 | 1 | 0 | 0 | 3 | 0 | 0 | 0 | 8 | 1 |
| Pittsburgh Riverhounds | 2015 | 11 | 1 | 0 | 0 | 0 | 0 | 0 | 0 | 11 | 1 |
| Koper | 2016 | 4 | 0 | 0 | 0 | 0 | 0 | 0 | 0 | 4 | 1 |
| Dunarea Calarasi | 2016–17 | 7 | 2 | 0 | 0 | 0 | 0 | 0 | 0 | 7 | 2 |
| Borac Čačak | 2017 | 9 | 0 | 1 | 0 | 0 | 0 | 0 | 0 | 10 | 0 |
| Szeged 2011 | 2018 | 14 | 3 | 0 | 0 | 0 | 0 | 0 | 0 | 14 | 3 |
| Career total | | 171 | 41 | 12 | 2 | 7 | 1 | 4 | 0 | 194 | 44 |

Updated to games played as of 11 November 2014.
