= Drissa Diarra (footballer, born 1985) =

Malian football player

Personal information
- Date of birth: 7 July 1985 (age 41)
- Place of birth: Bamako, Mali
- Height: 1.83 m (6 ft 0 in)
- Position: Midfielder

Team information
- Current team: FC Otranto

Youth career
- 2001–2005: Lecce

Senior career*
Years	Team	Apps	(Gls)
2003–2010	Lecce	20	(0)
2005–2006	→ Perugia (loan)	27	(3)
2006	→ Lucchese (loan)	7	(0)
2008–2009	→ Bellinzona (loan)	42	(7)
2010–2011	Bellinzona	35	(4)
2012–2014	Budapest Honvéd	32	(1)
2014–2016	Chiasso	45	(3)
2016	Nardò	11	(1)
2017–	FC Otranto	1	(0)

International career
2004–2005	Mali U-20	3	(0)
- * Club domestic league appearances and goals as of 13:21, 26 December 2019 (UTC)

Drissa Diarra (born 7 July 1985 in Bamako) is a Malian football player. He currently plays as a midfielder for FC Otranto in Italy.

He played for the Mali national football team at the 2001 FIFA U-17 World Championship and the 2003 FIFA World Youth Championship.

== Career ==
In 2017, Diarra joined the Italian club F.C. Otranto.

== Club statistics ==
Club	Season	League		Cup		League Cup		Europe		Total	
Club	Season	Apps	Goals	Apps	Goals	Apps	Goals	Apps	Goals	Apps	Goals
Lecce
Lecce	2003–04	3	0	0	0	0	0	0	0	3	0
Lecce	2004–05	1	0	0	0	0	0	0	0	1	0
Lecce	2006–07	11	0	0	0	0	0	0	0	11	0
Lecce	2007–08	4	0	0	0	0	0	0	0	4	0
Lecce	2009–10	1	0	1	0	0	0	0	0	2	0
Lecce	Total	20	0	1	0	0	0	0	0	21	0
Perugia
Perugia	2005–06	27	3	0	0	0	0	0	0	27	3
Perugia	Total	27	3	0	0	0	0	0	0	27	3
Bellinzona
Bellinzona	2008–09	25	4	3	0	0	0	2	0	30	4
Bellinzona	2009–10	15	3	0	0	2	0	0	0	17	3
Bellinzona	2010–11	34	4	3	0	1	0	0	0	38	4
Bellinzona	Total	74	11	6	0	3	0	2	0	85	11
Honvéd
Honvéd	2012–13	15	1	5	1	7	3	4	0	31	5
Honvéd	2013–14	17	0	1	0	3	0	4	2	25	2
Honvéd	Total	32	1	6	1	10	3	8	2	56	7
Career Total		153	15	13	1	13	3	10	2	189	21

Updated to games played as of 20 April 2014.
