= Souleymane Tandia =

Senegalese footballer

Personal information
- Full name: Souleymane Tandia
- Date of birth: 30 August 1987 (age 39)
- Place of birth: Dakar, Senegal
- Height: 1.90 m (6 ft 3 in)
- Position: Defender

Team information
- Current team: East Riffa

Youth career
- –2008: Nice

Senior career*
Years	Team	Apps	(Gls)
2008–2009	Gimnàstic	33	(4)
2009–2010	Melilla	30	(3)
2010–2011	Villefranche	9	(0)
2011–2012	Brussels	6	(0)
2012–2014	Budapest Honvéd	16	(6)
2014–2015	Orduspor	7	(1)
2015–2016	Khaitan	?	(?)
2016–2017	Ras Al Khaima	?	(?)
2017–	East Riffa	?	(?)
- * Club domestic league appearances and goals as of 1 July 2015

Souleymane Tandia (born 30 August 1987 in Dakar) is a Senegalese professional footballer who plays for East Riffa in Bahrain.
