= Kispest-Honvéd FC II =

- Full name: Kispest-Honvéd Football Club II
- Founded: 1909; 117 years ago
- Ground: Honvéd MFA Utánpótlás Központ; Budapest, Hungary
- Chairman: Attila Sánta
- Manager: István Körtvélyesi
- League: NB III; Southeast
- 2025–26: NB III; Southeast, 8th of 16
Home colours	Away colours

Kispest-Honvéd Football Club II is a Hungarian football club located in Budapest, Hungary. It currently plays in the Nemzeti Bajnokság III – Southeast, the third tier of Hungarian football. The team's colors are red and black.

== Current squad ==
As of 11 October 2026

Note: Flags indicate national team as defined under FIFA eligibility rules; some limited exceptions apply. Players may hold more than one non-FIFA nationality.

No.	Pos.	Nation	Player
1	GK	HUN	Gellért Dúzs
1	GK	HUN	Levente Schrankó
2	–	HUN	Álmos Horváth
3	–	HUN	Áron Russnák
4	–	HUN	Ádám Csörgő
4	DF	HUN	Alex Szabó
4	DF	HUN	Tibor Szabó
5	–	HUN	Botond Horváth
6	–	HUN	Botond Schön
7	FW	HUN	Dominik Hancz
8	–	HUN	Bence Kovács
8	–	HUN	Enzó Vata
9	–	HUN	Kristóf Kenéz
11	–	HUN	Dominik Kovács
13	–	HUN	Péter Vörös
14	–	HUN	Dominik Forró
14	FW	HUN	Erik Kovács
15	FW	HUN	Szilveszter Hetyei
16	–	HUN	Márk Meskó

No.	Pos.	Nation	Player
17	–	HUN	György Botos
17	–	HUN	Péter Jászberényi
17	–	HUN	Rupert Komlósi
17	–	HUN	Viktor Rankó
18	MF	ESP	Asier García
19	DF	HUN	Nemania Milencovici
21	–	HUN	Barna Kecskés
22	–	HUN	Milán Balaskó
22	–	HUN	Patrik Érsek
22	–	HUN	Lav Kis
22	–	HUN	Zalán Varga
23	–	HUN	Péter Hideg
23	–	HUN	Milán Miták
23	–	HUN	Márk Szelényi
24	DF	HUN	Bence Varga
25	DF	HUN	Bonifác Csonka
99	–	HUN	Barnabás Balogh
99	–	HUN	Dávid Czinki

== Staff ==
As of 11 October 2026

Position	Name
Manager	(Hungary) István Körtvélyesi
Assistant manager	(Croatia) Ivan Lovrić
Goalkeeper coach	(Hungary) István Brockhauser
Fitness coach	(Hungary) Marcell Likár
Video Analyst	(Hungary) Denton Koós
Masseur	(Hungary) Tamás Noskó
