= 2012–13 Egri FC season =

Egri FC
2012–13 season
- Chairman: (Hungary) Miklós Vancsa
- Manager: (Hungary) Antal Simon (until 14 February 2013) (Hungary) Ferenc Mészáros
- NB 1: 16. (Relegated)
- Hungarian Cup: 1. round
- Hungarian League Cup: Semi-final
- Top goalscorer: League: Norbert Németh (9); All: Norbert Németh (13)
- Highest home attendance: 2,000 v Ferencváros (1 September 2012)
- Lowest home attendance: 62 v Kaposvár (20 April 2013)
Home colours	Away colours

The 2012–13 season will be Egri FC's 6th competitive season, 1st consecutive season in the OTP Bank Liga and 104th year in existence as a football club.

== First team squad ==
Note: Flags indicate national team as defined under FIFA eligibility rules; some limited exceptions apply. Players may hold more than one non-FIFA nationality.

No.	Pos.	Nation	Player
1	GK	SVN	Darko Brljak
2	DF	HUN	József Piller
3	FW	HUN	Norbert Palásthy
4	DF	FRA	Ismaël Koné
5	MF	SRB	Čedomir Pavičević
6	MF	SRB	Vladimir Buač
7	MF	HUN	Ádám Albert
8	MF	HUN	Norbert Németh
9	MF	FRA	Yohan Lasimant
10	FW	HUN	Ádám Farkas
11	DF	HUN	Zsolt Balog
13	MF	HUN	Ádám Fenyvesi
14	MF	HUN	Csaba Preklet
15	DF	MKD	Jasmin Mecinović

No.	Pos.	Nation	Player
16	DF	SRB	Savo Raković
17	FW	HUN	Zoltán Horváth
18	MF	HUN	Attila Katona
20	MF	CZE	Jiří Kabele
22	MF	SRB	Saša Dobrić
23	MF	HUN	Dávid Zvara
24	MF	HUN	Dániel Kasza
26	GK	HUN	Gábor Sztankó
27	FW	HUN	Gábor Koós
55	DF	MNE	Marko Vidović
63	GK	HUN	Dávid Palásthy
77	FW	BRA	Tanque
99	FW	HUN	Bence Szabó

== Transfers ==
=== Summer ===
In: Note: Flags indicate national team as defined under FIFA eligibility rules; some limited exceptions apply. Players may hold more than one non-FIFA nationality.

No.	Pos.	Nation	Player
1	GK	SVN	Darko Brljak (from (Slovenia) Gorica)
4	DF	HUN	Gábor Kovács (from Vasas)
6	MF	AUT	Michael Stanislaw (from (Austria) Wiener Neustadt)
7	MF	HUN	Ádám Albert (from Vác)
8	MF	HUN	Norbert Németh (from Budapest Honvéd)
14	MF	HUN	Csaba Preklet (from (Italy) Reggina)
15	DF	MKD	Jasmin Mecinović (from (Norway) Sogndal)
20	MF	CZE	Jiří Kabele (from (Slovakia) Dunajská Streda)
31	MF	JAM	Wolry Wolfe (from (Jamaica) Humble Lions)
62	FW	CMR	Joël Tchami (from (Slovakia) Dunajská Streda)
68	GK	HUN	István Kövesfalvi (from Dabas)
99	FW	MNE	Goran Vujović (from Videoton)

Out: Note: Flags indicate national team as defined under FIFA eligibility rules; some limited exceptions apply. Players may hold more than one non-FIFA nationality.

No.	Pos.	Nation	Player
1	GK	HUN	Tamás Giák (to Austria)
4	DF	HUN	Viktor Benke (to Vác)
6	DF	HUN	Péter Bíró (loan return to Pápa)
7	MF	HUN	László Bojtor (to Rákospalota)
8	MF	HUN	Dávid Debreceni (to Felsőtárkány)
14	MF	HUN	Csaba Preklet (loan return to (Italy) Reggina)
15	MF	HUN	Ádám Fürjes (loan return to Vasas)
19	FW	ALG	Karim Benounes (to (Algeria) Constantine)
20	FW	HUN	János Olasz (to Rákospalota)
68	GK	HUN	István Kövesfalvi (Retired)
—	FW	HUN	József Kálmán (to Saágótarján)

=== Winter ===
In: Note: Flags indicate national team as defined under FIFA eligibility rules; some limited exceptions apply. Players may hold more than one non-FIFA nationality.

No.	Pos.	Nation	Player
3	FW	HUN	Norbert Palásthy (to Vác)
4	DF	FRA	Ismaël Koné (from (Greece) Psachna)
6	MF	SRB	Vladimir Buač (from (Kazakhstan) Atyrau)
8	MF	HUN	Dávid Debreceni (loan return from Felsőtárkány)
9	MF	FRA	Yohan Lasimant (from (Greece) AEL)
16	DF	SRB	Savo Raković (from Diósgyőr)
63	GK	HUN	Dávid Palásthy (to Vác)
—	MF	HUN	István Berki (from Vác)

Out: Note: Flags indicate national team as defined under FIFA eligibility rules; some limited exceptions apply. Players may hold more than one non-FIFA nationality.

No.	Pos.	Nation	Player
3	DF	CZE	Petr Knakal (to (Switzerland) Linth 04)
4	DF	HUN	Gábor Kovács (to Paks)
6	MF	AUT	Michael Stanislaw (to (Austria) Horn)
8	MF	HUN	Dávid Debreceni
9	FW	HUN	Tamás Romhányi (to Felsőtárkány)
12	DF	CZE	Josef Hamouz (to (Czech Republic) Roudnice nad Labem)
16	FW	MKD	Simeon Hristov (loan to (North Macedonia) Pelister)
19	FW	SRB	Dušan Pavlov (loan to Putnok)
21	FW	CAN	Igor Pisanjuk (to Vasas)
31	MF	JAM	Wolry Wolfe
62	FW	CMR	Joël Tchami
99	FW	MNE	Goran Vujović (to (Montenegro) Lovćen)

- List of Hungarian football transfers summer 2012
- List of Hungarian football transfers winter 2012–13

== Statistics ==
=== Appearances and goals ===
Last updated on 2 June 2013.

No.	Pos	Nat	Player	Total		OTP Bank Liga		Hungarian Cup		League Cup	
No.	Pos	Nat	Player	Apps	Goals	Apps	Goals	Apps	Goals	Apps	Goals
1	GK	(Slovenia) SVN	Darko Brljak	20	-40	14	-27	1	-1	5	-12
2	DF	(Hungary) HUN	József Piller	13	1	8	0	1	0	4	1
3	FW	(Hungary) HUN	Norbert Palásthy	9	0	6	0	0	0	3	0
4	DF	(France) FRA	Ismaël Koné	11	0	10	0	0	0	1	0
5	MF	(Serbia) SRB	Čedomir Pavičević	23	0	18	0	0	0	5	0
6	MF	(Serbia) SRB	Vladimir Buač	13	0	10	0	0	0	3	0
7	MF	(Hungary) HUN	Ádám Albert	31	2	20	1	1	0	10	1
8	MF	(Hungary) HUN	Norbert Németh	36	13	28	9	0	0	8	4
9	MF	(France) FRA	Yohan Lasimant	7	1	6	1	0	0	1	0
10	FW	(Hungary) HUN	Ádám Farkas	30	3	25	3	1	0	4	0
11	DF	(Hungary) HUN	Zsolt Balog	31	0	24	0	0	0	7	0
13	MF	(Hungary) HUN	Ádám Fenyvesi	1	0	1	0	0	0	0	0
14	MF	(Hungary) HUN	Csaba Preklet	23	1	18	0	1	0	4	1
15	DF	(North Macedonia) MKD	Jasmin Mecinović	28	1	19	0	1	0	8	1
16	DF	(Serbia) SRB	Savo Raković	6	0	5	0	0	0	1	0
17	FW	(Hungary) HUN	Zoltán Horváth	23	10	16	4	1	0	6	6
18	MF	(Hungary) HUN	Attila Katona	12	0	8	0	0	0	4	0
20	MF	(Czech Republic) CZE	Jiří Kabele	24	0	18	0	0	0	6	0
22	MF	(Serbia) SRB	Saša Dobrić	21	1	19	1	0	0	2	0
23	MF	(Hungary) HUN	Dávid Zvara	10	1	7	1	0	0	3	0
24	MF	(Hungary) HUN	Dániel Kasza	9	0	5	0	0	0	4	0
26	GK	(Hungary) HUN	Gábor Sztankó	22	-43	17	-38	0	0	5	-5
27	FW	(Hungary) HUN	Gábor Koós	27	6	19	2	1	0	7	4
55	DF	(Montenegro) MNE	Marko Vidović	11	0	9	0	0	0	2	0
63	GK	(Hungary) HUN	Dávid Palásthy	1	-1	1	-1	0	0	0	0
77	FW	(Brazil) BRA	Tanque	1	0	1	0	0	0	0	0
99	FW	(Hungary) HUN	Bence Szabó	9	0	7	0	0	0	2	0
Youth players:
68	GK	(Hungary) HUN	István Kövesfalvi	1	0	0	0	0	0	1	0
Players currently out on loan:
16	FW	(North Macedonia) MKD	Simeon Hristov	5	0	2	0	1	0	2	0
19	FW	(Serbia) SRB	Dušan Pavlov	16	1	10	1	1	0	5	0
Players no longer at the club:
3	DF	(Czech Republic) CZE	Petr Knakal	18	1	12	0	1	0	5	1
4	DF	(Hungary) HUN	Gábor Kovács	23	0	17	0	1	0	5	0
6	MF	(Austria) AUT	Michael Stanislaw	16	0	13	0	1	0	2	0
12	DF	(Czech Republic) CZE	Josef Hamouz	11	0	7	0	0	0	4	0
21	FW	(Canada) CAN	Igor Pisanjuk	15	1	11	1	1	0	3	0
31	MF	(Jamaica) JAM	Wolry Wolfe	1	0	0	0	0	0	1	0
62	FW	(Cameroon) CMR	Joël Tchami	3	1	1	0	0	0	2	1
99	FW	(Montenegro) MNE	Goran Vujović	11	0	8	0	0	0	3	0

=== Top scorers ===
Includes all competitive matches. The list is sorted by shirt number when total goals are equal.

Last updated on 2 June 2013

Position	Nation	Number	Name	OTP Bank Liga	Hungarian Cup	League Cup	Total
1	(Hungary)	8	Norbert Németh	9	0	4	13
2	(Hungary)	17	Zoltán Horváth	4	0	6	10
3	(Hungary)	27	Gábor Koós	2	0	4	6
4	(Serbia)	10	Ádám Farkas	3	0	0	3
5	(Hungary)	7	Ádám Albert	1	0	1	2
6	(Canada)	21	Igor Pisanjuk	1	0	0	1
7	(Serbia)	22	Saša Dobrić	1	0	0	1
8	(Serbia)	19	Dušan Pavlov	1	0	0	1
9	(Hungary)	23	Dávid Zvara	1	0	0	1
10	(France)	9	Yohan Lasimant	1	0	0	1
11	(Hungary)	2	József Piller	0	0	1	1
12	(Cameroon)	13	Joël Tchami	0	0	1	1
13	(Czech Republic)	3	Petr Knakal	0	0	1	1
14	(Hungary)	14	Csaba Preklet	0	0	1	1
15	(North Macedonia)	15	Jasmin Mecinović	0	0	1	1
/	/	/	Own Goals	1	0	1	2
			TOTALS	25	0	21	46

=== Disciplinary record ===
Includes all competitive matches. Players with 1 card or more included only.

Last updated on 2 June 2013

Position	Nation	Number	Name	OTP Bank Liga		Hungarian Cup		League Cup		Total (Hu Total)	
Position	Nation	Number	Name	Booked	Sent off (straight red)	Booked	Sent off (straight red)	Booked	Sent off (straight red)	Booked	Sent off (straight red)
GK	(Slovenia)	1	Darko Brljak	2	0	0	0	0	0	2 (2)	0 (0)
DF	(Hungary)	2	József Piller	2	0	0	0	2	0	4 (2)	0 (0)
DF	(Czech Republic)	3	Petr Knakal	3	2	0	0	1	0	4 (3)	2 (2)
DF	(Hungary)	4	Gábor Kovács	4	0	1	0	0	0	5 (4)	0 (0)
MF	(Serbia)	5	Čedomir Pavičević	7	0	0	0	2	0	9 (7)	0 (0)
MF	(Serbia)	6	Vladimir Buač	3	0	0	0	1	0	4 (3)	0 (0)
MF	(Austria)	6	Michael Stanislaw	3	0	0	0	0	0	3 (3)	0 (0)
MF	(Hungary)	7	Ádám Albert	3	0	0	0	1	0	4 (3)	0 (0)
MF	(Hungary)	8	Norbert Németh	2	0	0	0	3	0	5 (2)	0 (0)
MF	(Hungary)	10	Ádám Farkas	4	0	1	0	0	0	5 (4)	0 (0)
DF	(Hungary)	11	Zsolt Balog	3	0	0	0	2	0	5 (3)	0 (0)
DF	(Czech Republic)	12	Josef Hamouz	2	0	0	0	1	0	3 (2)	0 (0)
MF	(Hungary)	14	Csaba Preklet	7	0	0	0	2	0	9 (7)	0 (0)
DF	(North Macedonia)	15	Jasmin Mecinović	3	1	0	0	0	0	3 (3)	1 (1)
DF	(Serbia)	16	Savo Raković	3	0	0	0	0	0	3 (3)	0 (0)
FW	(Hungary)	17	Zoltán Horváth	1	0	0	0	1	0	2 (1)	0 (0)
MF	(Hungary)	18	Attila Katona	1	0	0	0	0	0	1 (1)	0 (0)
MF	(Czech Republic)	20	Jiří Kabele	0	1	0	0	0	0	0 (0)	1 (1)
FW	(Canada)	21	Igor Pisanjuk	3	0	1	0	1	0	5 (3)	0 (0)
MF	(Serbia)	22	Saša Dobrić	3	0	0	0	0	0	3 (3)	0 (0)
MF	(Hungary)	24	Dániel Kasza	1	0	0	0	1	0	2 (1)	0 (0)
GK	(Hungary)	26	Gábor Sztankó	1	1	0	0	1	0	2 (1)	1 (1)
FW	(Hungary)	27	Gábor Koós	1	0	0	0	1	0	2 (1)	0 (0)
DF	(Montenegro)	55	Marko Vidović	3	0	0	0	0	0	3 (3)	0 (0)
FW	(Cameroon)	62	Joël Tchami	1	0	0	0	0	0	1 (1)	0 (0)
FW	(Montenegro)	99	Goran Vujović	1	0	0	0	0	0	1 (1)	0 (0)
			TOTALS	67	5	3	0	20	0	90 (67)	5 (5)

=== Overall ===
Games played	41 (30 OTP Bank Liga, 1 Hungarian Cup and 10 Hungarian League Cup)
Games won	8 (3 OTP Bank Liga, 0 Hungarian Cup and 5 Hungarian League Cup)
Games drawn	7 (6 OTP Bank Liga, 0 Hungarian Cup and 1 Hungarian League Cup)
Games lost	26 (21 OTP Bank Liga, 1 Hungarian Cup and 4 Hungarian League Cup)
Goals scored	46
Goals conceded	85
Goal difference	-39
Yellow cards	90
Red cards	5
Worst discipline	(Serbia) Čedomir Pavičević (9 (yellow card) , 0 (red card) )
Worst discipline	(Hungary) Csaba Preklet (9 (yellow card) , 0 (red card) )
Best result	4–0 (H) v Újpest FC - Ligakupa - 13-11-2012
Worst result	1–6 (A) v Lombard-Pápa TFC - OTP Bank Liga - 11-05-2013
Most appearances	(Hungary) Norbert Németh (36 appearances)
Top scorer	(Hungary) Norbert Németh (13 goals)
Points	31/123 (25.2%)

Last updated: 2 June 2013

== Nemzeti Bajnokság I ==
=== Matches ===
27 July 2012 1	Szombathely	4–2	Eger	Szombathely, Vas County
17:00 CEST	Kenesei 50'; Halmosi 52'; Iszlai 58' (pen.); Andorka 63' (pen.)	(Report)	Pisanjuk 45'; Németh 74'	Stadium: Rohonci úti Stadion; Attendance: 6,000; Referee: (Hungary) József Berger

3 August 2012 2	Eger	1–1	Siófok	Budapest, Pest County
19:00 CEST	Dobrić 60'	(Report)	Sipos 21'	Stadium: Stadion Rudolf Illovszky; Attendance: 1,000; Referee: (Hungary) János Takács

11 August 2012 3	Diósgyőr	1–0	Eger	Miskolc, Borsod-Abaúj-Zemplén County
19:00 CEST	Seydi 46'	(Report)		Stadium: DVTK Stadion; Attendance: 8,000; Referee: (Hungary) Balázs Böcskei

19 August 2012 4	Videoton	2–1	Eger	Székesfehérvár, Fejér County
18:30 CEST	Torghelle 87'; Nikolić 90+2' (pen.)	(Report)	Koós 56'	Stadium: Sóstói Stadion; Attendance: 1,500; Referee: (Hungary) Roland Weizer

24 August 2012 5	Paks	0–1	Eger	Paks, Tolna County
17:00 CEST		(Report)	Pavlov 84'	Stadium: Stadion PSE; Attendance: 1,500; Referee: (Hungary) István Vad

1 September 2012 6	Eger	2–2	Ferencváros	Debrecen, Hajdú-Bihar County
19:00 CEST	Németh 72', 90+4' (pen.)	(Report)	Perić 47' (pen.); Böde 52'	Stadium: Stadion Oláh Gábor Út; Attendance: 2,000; Referee: (Hungary) Péter Solymosi

15 September 2012 7	MTK Budapest	3–0	Eger	Budapest, Pest County
18:30 CEST	Tischler 61', 77', 82'	(Report)		Stadium: Hidegkuti Nándor Stadium; Attendance: 1,500; Referee: (Hungary) Zoltán Iványi

22 September 2012 8	Eger	1–0	Debrecen	Miskolc, Borsod-Abaúj-Zemplén County
16:00 CEST	Németh 56'	(Report)		Stadium: DVTK Stadion; Attendance: 250; Referee: (Hungary) Gergely Szőts

29 September 2012 9	Kaposvár	0–0	Eger	Kaposvár, Somogy County
16:00 CEST		(Report)		Stadium: Stadion Kaposvár Rákóczi; Attendance: 2,000; Referee: (Hungary) Mihály Fábián

6 October 2012 10	Eger	0–2	Kecskemét	Debrecen, Hajdú-Bihar County
16:00 CEST		(Report)	Knakal 24' (o.g.); Burgos 46'	Stadium: Stadion Oláh Gábor Út; Attendance: 200; Referee: (Hungary) Tamás Bognár

20 October 2012 11	Pécs	0–0	Eger	Pécs, Baranya County
18:30 CEST		(Report)		Stadium: Stadion PMFC; Attendance: 2,000; Referee: (Hungary) Krisztián Pánczél

26 October 2012 12	Eger	1–1	Pápa	Debrecen, Hajdú-Bihar County
19:00 CEST	Farkas 29'	(Report)	Knakal 33' (o.g.)	Stadium: Stadion Oláh Gábor Út; Attendance: 100; Referee: (Hungary) Dániel Becséri

2 November 2012 13	Újpest	3–0	Eger	Budapest, Pest County
19:00 CEST	Vasiljević 14'; Moraes 65'; Balogh 87'	(Report)		Stadium: Szusza Ferenc Stadium; Attendance: 2,800; Referee: (Hungary) Zsolt Szabó

10 November 2012 14	Eger	1–3	Budapest Honvéd	Budapest, Pest County
16:00 CEST	Németh 27'	(Report)	Délczeg 43' (pen.); Baráth 54'; Vernes 82'	Stadium: Stadion Rudolf Illovszky; Attendance: 350; Referee: (Hungary) Balázs Berke

17 November 2012 15	Győri ETO FC	2–1	Egri FC	Győr, Győr-Moson-Sopron County
14:00 CET	Kamber 12'; Koltai 15'	(Report)	Németh 32'	Stadium: ETO Park; Attendance: 2,500; Referee: (Hungary) Gábor Oláh

24 November 2012 16	Eger	1–2	Szombathely	Budapest, Pest County
16:00 CEST	Németh 83'	(Report)	Ugrai 53'; Andorka 58'	Stadium: Stadion Rudolf Illovszky; Attendance: 100; Referee: (Hungary) Mihály Fábián

1 December 2012 17	Siófok	4–3	Eger	Siófok, Somogy County
16:00 CET	Melczer 10' (pen.), 76' (pen.), 88' (pen.); Dajić 64'	(Report)	Horváth 53'; Albert 58'; Németh 68'	Stadium: Révész Street Stadium; Attendance: 200; Referee: (Hungary) Zoltán Iványi

1 March 2013 18	Eger	0–1	Diósgyőr	Vác, Pest County
19:00 CET		(Report)	Tisza 17'	Stadium: Stadion Városi Vác; Attendance: 800; Referee: (Hungary) Viktor Kassai

9 March 2013 19	Eger	0–4	Videoton	Vác, Pest County
16:00 CET		(Report)	Szekeres 11', 54'; Brachi 17'; Kovács 60'	Stadium: Stadion Városi Vác; Attendance: 450; Referee: (Hungary) Szabolcs Szilasi

9 April 2013 20	Eger	2–2	Paks	Vác, Pest County
16:00 CEST	Horváth 12'; Koós 35'	(Report)	Pap 67'; Éger 79' (pen.)	Stadium: Stadion Városi Vác; Attendance: 100; Referee: (Hungary) József Erdős

30 March 2013 21	Ferencváros	4–0	Eger	Budapest, Pest County
16:30 CET	Böde 4', 74'; Jenner 10'; Somália 67'	(Report)		Stadium: Stadion Puskás Ferenc; Attendance: 4,000; Referee: (Hungary) Zoltán Iványi

6 April 2013 22	Eger	0–3	MTK Budapest	Vác, Pest County
18:30 CEST		(Report)	Vass 4'; Kanta 18' (pen.), 39'	Stadium: Stadion Városi Vác; Attendance: 300; Referee: (Hungary) Gergely Szőts

13 April 2013 23	Debrecen	3–0	Eger	Debrecen, Hajdú-Bihar County
14:00 CEST	Sidibe 33'; Bouadla 75'; Coulibaly 80'	(Report)		Stadium: Stadion Oláh Gábor Út; Attendance: 2,000; Referee: (Hungary) Szabolcs Szilasi

20 April 2013 24	Eger	1–0	Kaposvár	Vác, Pest County
16:00 CEST	Farkas 34'	(Report)		Stadium: Stadion Városi Vác; Attendance: 62; Referee: (Hungary) Roland Veizer

26 April 2013 25	Kecskemét	3–1	Eger	Kecskemét, Bács-Kiskun County
17:00 CEST	Raković 6' (o.g.); Mohl 22'; Rajczi 26'	(Report)	Zvara 34'	Stadium: Széktói Stadion; Attendance: 2,000; Referee: (Hungary) Ádám Radványi

4 May 2013 26	Eger	2–3	Pécs	Vác, Pest County
16:00 CEST	Lasimant 14'; Gaál 90+1' (o.g.)	(Report)	Simon 23'; Horváth 45'; Wittrédi 63'	Stadium: Stadion Városi Vác; Attendance: 67; Referee: (Hungary) Dániel Becséri

11 May 2013 27	Pápa	6–1	Eger	Pápa, Veszprém County
14:00 CEST	Griffiths 17'; Quintero 22', 77'; Marić 26'; Arsić 33'; Király 90'	(Report)	Horváth 71'	Stadium: Stadion Várkerti; Attendance: 500; Referee: (Hungary) Roland Veizer

18 May 2013 28	Eger	1–2	Újpest	Vác, Pest County
16:00 CEST	Horváth 76'	(Report)	Tshibuabua 24'; Simon 72'	Stadium: Stadion Városi Vác; Attendance: 100; Referee: (Hungary) Mihály Fábián

25 May 2013 29	Budapest Honvéd	3–0	Eger	Budapest, Pest County
16:00 CEST	Lanzafame 22', 73' (pen.); Nagy 76'	(Report)		Stadium: Bozsik Stadion; Referee: (Hungary) Dániel Becséri

1 June 2013 30	Eger	2–3	Győr	Vác, Pest County
14:00 CEST	Németh 4'; Farkas 73' (pen.)	(Report)	Kalmár 11'; Pilibaitis 18'; Pátkai 82'	Stadium: Stadion Városi Vác; Attendance: 200; Referee: (Hungary) Gergely Szőts

=== Classification ===
Pos	Team	Pld	W	D	L	GF	GA	GD	Pts	Qualification or relegation
12	Pécs	30	10	7	13	33	44	−11	37	
13	Paks	30	8	11	11	40	38	+2	35	
14	Pápa	30	7	7	16	26	46	−20	28	
15	Siófok (R)	30	7	4	19	31	61	−30	25	Relegation to Nemzeti Bajnokság II
16	Eger (R)	30	3	6	21	25	67	−42	15	Relegation to Nemzeti Bajnokság II

Source: mlsz.hu (in Hungarian)
Rules for classification: 1st points; 2nd overall wins; 3rd goal difference; 4th head-to-head points; 5th head-to-head goal difference; 6th head-to-head away goals scored; 7th fair-play points; 8th drawing of lots
(R) Relegated

=== Results summary ===
Overall								Home						Away					
Pld	W	D	L	GF	GA	GD	Pts	W	D	L	GF	GA	GD	W	D	L	GF	GA	GD
30	3	6	21	25	67	−42	15	2	4	9	15	29	−14	1	2	12	10	38	−28

Last updated: 2 June 2013.
Source: NB1

=== Results by round ===
Round	1	2	3	4	5	6	7	8	9	10	11	12	13	14	15	16	17	18	19	20	21	22	23	24	25	26	27	28	29	30
Ground	A	H	A	A	A	H	A	H	A	H	A	H	A	H	A	H	A	H	H	H	A	H	A	H	A	H	A	H	A	H
Result	L	D	L	L	W	D	L	W	D	L	D	D	L	L	L	L	L	L	L	D	L	L	L	W	L	L	L	L	L	L
Position	14	14	15	15	12	13	15	13	12	14	15	15	15	15	15	15	15	15	15	16	16	16	16	16	16	16	16	16	16	16

Updated to match(es) played on 2 June 2013. Source: Matches
A = Away; H = Home; W = Win; D = Draw; L = Loss

== Hungarian Cup ==
8 August 2012 1	Nyíregyháza Spartacus	1–0	Egri FC	Nyíregyháza, Szabolcs-Szatmár-Bereg County
17:00 CET (UTC+01)	Montvai 85'	(Report)		Stadium: Városi Stadion; Attendance: 500; Referee: (Hungary) Róbert Nagy

== League Cup ==
=== Group stage ===
5 September 2012 1	Eger	1–3	Debrecen	Eger, Heves County
17:00 CEST	Németh 23'	(Report)	Lucas 11'; Ferenczi 28'; Rezes 45'	Stadium: Szentmarjay Tibor Városi Stadion; Attendance: 300; Referee: (Hungary) Ferenc Karakó

7 September 2012 2	Újpest	2–5	Eger	Budapest, Pest County
14:00 CEST	Kálmán 6'; Szabó 75'	(Report)	Piller 32'; Koós 37', 76'; Németh 55'; Tchami 86'	Stadium: Szusza Ferenc Stadium; Attendance: 200; Referee: (Hungary) Szabolcs Szilasi

10 October 2012 3	Diósgyőr	3–0	Eger	Miskolc, Borsod-Abaúj-Zemplén County
17:00 CEST	Gohér 48'; Tisza 62' (pen.), 82'	(Report)		Stadium: DVTK Stadion; Attendance: 1,200; Referee: (Hungary) Balázs Böcskei

13 October 2012 4	Eger	2–1	Diósgyőr	Eger, Heves County
14:00 CEST	Knakal 19'; Preklet 63'	(Report)	Tisza 29'	Stadium: Szentmarjay Tibor Városi Stadion; Attendance: 300; Referee: (Hungary) Zoltán J. Kovács

13 November 2012 5	Eger	4–0	Újpest	Eger, Heves County
13:00 CET	Horváth 4', 37', 40'; Albert 20'	(Report)		Stadium: Szentmarjay Tibor Városi Stadion; Attendance: 100; Referee: (Hungary) Balázs Böcskei

5 December 2012 6	Debrecen	0–1	Eger	Debrecen, Hajdú-Bihar County
13:00 CEST		(Report)	Németh 2'	Stadium: Stadion Oláh Gábor Út; Attendance: 100; Referee: (Hungary) Ádám Németh

==== Classification ====
Pos	Team	Pld	W	D	L	GF	GA	GD	Pts	Qualification
1	Debrecen	6	4	0	2	13	6	+7	12	Advance to knockout phase
2	Eger	6	4	0	2	13	9	+4	12	Advance to knockout phase
3	Diósgyőr	6	2	0	4	11	13	−2	6	
4	Újpest	6	2	0	4	9	18	−9	6	

Rules for classification: 1) points; 2) goal difference; 3) number of goals scored.

=== Knockout phase ===
20 February 2013 Quarter-final (1st leg)	Eger	4–1	Győr	Eger, Heves County
13:00 CET	Horváth 40', 45', 75'; Takács 88' (o.g.)	(Report)	Takács 63'	Stadium: Szentmarjay Tibor Városi Stadion; Attendance: 200; Referee: (Hungary) Zsolt Szabó

6 March 2013 Quarter-final (2nd leg)	Győr	3–3 (4–7 agg.)	Eger	Győr, Győr-Moson-Sopron County
13:30	Andrić 5'; Kvilitaia 26'; Kronaveter 79'	(Report)	Németh 36' (pen.); Koós 49', 64'	Stadium: ETO Park; Attendance: 300; Referee: (Hungary) József Erdős

20 March 2013 Semi-final (1st leg)	Eger	1–3	Ferencváros	Vác, Pest County
18:00 CET	Mecinović 22'	(Report)	Jenner 35'; Aborah 37'; Čukić 53'	Stadium: Stadion Városi Vác; Attendance: 1,000; Referee: (Hungary) Zsolt Szabó

23 March 2013 Semi-final (2nd leg)	Ferencváros	1–0 (4–1 agg.)	Eger	Budapest, Pest County
18:00	Perić 16'	(Report)		Stadium: Stadion Albert Flórián; Attendance: 800; Referee: (Hungary) Dániel Becséri
