= List of Hungarian football transfers winter 2012–13 =

This is a list of Hungarian football transfers for the 2012–13 winter transfer window by club. Only transfers of clubs in the OTP Bank Liga are included.

The summer transfer window opened on 1 January 2013, although a few transfers took place prior to that date. The window closed at midnight on 24 February 2013. Players without a club could have joined one at any time, either during or in between transfer windows.

== OTP Bank Liga ==
=== BFC Siófok ===
In: Note: Flags indicate national team as defined under FIFA eligibility rules; some limited exceptions apply. Players may hold more than one non-FIFA nationality.

No.	Pos.	Nation	Player
2	DF	HUN	Krisztián Timár (from (Vietnam) Da Nang)
6	DF	HUN	Zoltán Takács (from Újpest FC)
10	FW	HUN	János Máté (loan from Ferencváros)
21	DF	HUN	Zoltán Kiss (from Békéscsaba)
23	MF	HUN	Attila Menyhárt (from Ferencváros)
29	MF	HUN	Norbert Mokánszki (from Debrecen II)

Out: Note: Flags indicate national team as defined under FIFA eligibility rules; some limited exceptions apply. Players may hold more than one non-FIFA nationality.

No.	Pos.	Nation	Player
2	DF	HUN	József Mogyorósi (to Kecskemét)
6	MF	HUN	Tamás Egerszegi (loan return to Újpest)
10	MF	HUN	Norbert Sipos (to Szombathely (futsal))
21	FW	HUN	Balázs Zamostny (loan return to Újpest)
23	MF	SRB	Milan Cokić (loan return to Kecskemét)
25	FW	HUN	Marcell Molnár (to BKV Előre)
29	MF	SVK	Marián Sluka (to Zalaegerszeg)

=== Budapest Honvéd FC ===
In: Note: Flags indicate national team as defined under FIFA eligibility rules; some limited exceptions apply. Players may hold more than one non-FIFA nationality.

No.	Pos.	Nation	Player
11	FW	ITA	Davide Lanzafame (loan from (Italy) Catania)
13	DF	ITA	Raffaele Alcibiade (loan from (Italy) Juventus)
15	FW	ITA	Leandro Martínez (from (Italy) Cremonese)
18	MF	HUN	Attila Lőrinczy (from Budapest Honvéd II)
19	FW	SRB	Filip Holender (from Budapest Honvéd U-19)
23	DF	ROU	Claudiu Pascariu (from (Romania) Târgu Mureș)
28	FW	HUN	Gergely Bobál (from Budapest Honvéd U-19)
—	MF	HUN	Mihály Csábi (from Budapest Honvéd U-19)
—	DF	ITA	Nicola Canzian (from (Italy) SPAL)

Out: Note: Flags indicate national team as defined under FIFA eligibility rules; some limited exceptions apply. Players may hold more than one non-FIFA nationality.

No.	Pos.	Nation	Player
5	DF	HUN	András Debreceni (to Budapest Honvéd II)
11	MF	CRO	Boris Bjelkanović (to Putnok)
13	FW	SRB	Marko Rajić
15	DF	MNE	Marko Vidović (to Eger)
16	FW	HUN	Krisztián Nagy (loan to Kazicbarcika)
19	FW	SEN	Ibrahima Thiam
29	DF	HUN	Alexisz Novák (to Budapest Honvéd II)
70	FW	HUN	Milán Faggyas (to Szolnok)
85	FW	SEN	Dieng Abass (loan to (Vietnam) Thanh Hóa)
99	FW	ITA	Donato Bottone

=== Debreceni VSC ===
In: Note: Flags indicate national team as defined under FIFA eligibility rules; some limited exceptions apply. Players may hold more than one non-FIFA nationality.

No.	Pos.	Nation	Player
6	MF	HON	Luis Ramos (from Kecskemét)
30	FW	BIH	Stevo Nikolić (loan return from (Slovakia) Spartak Trnava)
90	DF	FRA	Mamadou Wague (from (France) Metz)

Out: Note: Flags indicate national team as defined under FIFA eligibility rules; some limited exceptions apply. Players may hold more than one non-FIFA nationality.

No.	Pos.	Nation	Player
10	FW	HUN	Balázs Farkas II (to Győr)
16	DF	HUN	Róbert Varga (to Kecskemét)
20	MF	CMR	Mbengono Yannick (to Kecskemét)
24	MF	BIH	Nenad Kiso (to (Azerbaijan) Simurq)
33	MF	HUN	József Varga (loan to (Germany) Greuther Fürth)
53	MF	HUN	Botond Birtalan (to Kozármisleny)
99	MF	GAB	Roguy Méyé

=== Diósgyőri VTK ===
In: Note: Flags indicate national team as defined under FIFA eligibility rules; some limited exceptions apply. Players may hold more than one non-FIFA nationality.

No.	Pos.	Nation	Player
4	DF	HUN	Tamás Kádár (loan from (Netherlands) Roda)
16	MF	HUN	Tibor Halgas (loan return from Cegléd)
98	MF	MAR	Youssef Sekour (loan return from Pápa)

Out: Note: Flags indicate national team as defined under FIFA eligibility rules; some limited exceptions apply. Players may hold more than one non-FIFA nationality.

No.	Pos.	Nation	Player
5	DF	CRO	Igor Gal
11	DF	BRA	Jeff Silva (loan return to Videoton)
16	MF	HUN	Tibor Halgas (to Kazincbarcika)
26	DF	SRB	Savo Raković (to Eger)
91	MF	HUN	Péter Bogáti (loan to Kazincbarcika)

=== Egri FC ===
In: Note: Flags indicate national team as defined under FIFA eligibility rules; some limited exceptions apply. Players may hold more than one non-FIFA nationality.

No.	Pos.	Nation	Player
3	FW	HUN	Norbert Palásthy (to Vác)
4	DF	FRA	Ismaël Koné (from (Greece) Psachna)
6	MF	SRB	Vladimir Buač (from (Kazakhstan) Atyrau)
8	MF	HUN	Dávid Debreceni (loan return from Felsőtárkány)
9	MF	FRA	Yohan Lasimant (from (Greece) AEL)
16	DF	SRB	Savo Raković (from Diósgyőr)
63	GK	HUN	Dávid Palásthy (to Vác)
—	MF	HUN	István Berki (from Vác)

Out: Note: Flags indicate national team as defined under FIFA eligibility rules; some limited exceptions apply. Players may hold more than one non-FIFA nationality.

No.	Pos.	Nation	Player
3	DF	CZE	Petr Knakal (to (Switzerland) Linth 04)
4	DF	HUN	Gábor Kovács (to Paks)
6	MF	AUT	Michael Stanislaw (to (Austria) Horn)
8	MF	HUN	Dávid Debreceni
9	FW	HUN	Tamás Romhányi (to Felsőtárkány)
12	DF	CZE	Josef Hamouz (to (Czech Republic) Roudnice nad Labem)
16	FW	MKD	Simeon Hristov (loan to (North Macedonia) Pelister)
19	FW	SRB	Dušan Pavlov (loan to Putnok)
21	FW	CAN	Igor Pisanjuk (to Vasas)
31	MF	JAM	Wolry Wolfe
62	FW	CMR	Joël Tchami
99	FW	MNE	Goran Vujović (to (Montenegro) Lovćen)

=== Ferencvárosi TC ===
In: Note: Flags indicate national team as defined under FIFA eligibility rules; some limited exceptions apply. Players may hold more than one non-FIFA nationality.

No.	Pos.	Nation	Player
11	MF	BEL	Stanley Aborah (from (Slovenia) Mura)
16	MF	HUN	Tamás Csilus (from Ferencváros U-19)
20	FW	CUW	Quenten Martinus (from (Netherlands) Heerenveen)
23	DF	BRA	Júnior Fell (from (Brazil) Metropolitano)
99	FW	BRA	Leonardo Santiago (from (Netherlands) Breda)

Out: Note: Flags indicate national team as defined under FIFA eligibility rules; some limited exceptions apply. Players may hold more than one non-FIFA nationality.

No.	Pos.	Nation	Player
11	FW	HUN	János Máté (loan to Ferencváros)
20	MF	HUN	Attila Menyhárt (to Ferencváros)
22	MF	HUN	Attila Busai (loan to Szolnok)
26	DF	HUN	Tamás Grúz (loan to Szolnok)
99	FW	HUN	Gergő Beliczky (to Pápa)

=== Győri ETO FC ===
In: Note: Flags indicate national team as defined under FIFA eligibility rules; some limited exceptions apply. Players may hold more than one non-FIFA nationality.

No.	Pos.	Nation	Player
5	DF	SVK	Marián Had (from (Slovakia) Slovan Bratislava)
6	MF	EST	Tarmo Kink (loan from (Italy) Varese)
7	FW	HUN	Balázs Farkas II (from Debrecen)
13	MF	HUN	Zsolt Kalmár (from Győr U-19)
19	FW	HUN	András Simon (loan return from Pápa)
25	FW	GEO	Giorgi Kvilitaia (from (Georgia (country)) Sasco)
26	GK	SVK	Ľuboš Kamenár (from (France) Nantes)

Out: Note: Flags indicate national team as defined under FIFA eligibility rules; some limited exceptions apply. Players may hold more than one non-FIFA nationality.

No.	Pos.	Nation	Player
7	FW	ROU	Mihai Dina (to (Romania) Timişoara)
19	FW	HUN	András Simon (loan to Szombathely)

=== Kaposvári Rákóczi FC ===
In: Note: Flags indicate national team as defined under FIFA eligibility rules; some limited exceptions apply. Players may hold more than one non-FIFA nationality.

No.	Pos.	Nation	Player
1	GK	HUN	Edvárd Rusák (from Kaposvár II)
23	GK	SRB	Marko Campar (from (Romania) Brazi)
25	MF	SEN	Khaly Thiam (from Kaposvár II)
29	DF	GRE	Lazaros Fotias (from (Greece) Epanomi)

Out: Note: Flags indicate national team as defined under FIFA eligibility rules; some limited exceptions apply. Players may hold more than one non-FIFA nationality.

No.	Pos.	Nation	Player
3	MF	HUN	Olivér Fenyvesi (to Kozármisleny)
6	MF	HUN	György Katona (to Nyíregyháza)
23	GK	HUN	László Horváth (to Szigetszentmiklós)
26	DF	HUN	Zalán Vadas (to Sopron)

=== Kecskeméti TE ===
In: Note: Flags indicate national team as defined under FIFA eligibility rules; some limited exceptions apply. Players may hold more than one non-FIFA nationality.

No.	Pos.	Nation	Player
3	DF	HUN	József Mogyorósi (from Siófok)
4	DF	HUN	Róbert Varga (from Debrecen)
14	MF	MNE	Marko Vukasović (from (Serbia) Novi Sad)
17	MF	CMR	Christian Ebala (loan return from (Kazakhstan) Astana)
18	MF	HUN	Attila Hullám (from Szigetszentmiklós)
20	MF	GEO	Givi Ioseliani (from (Georgia (country)) Kutaisi)
20	MF	CTA	Foxi Kethevoama (loan return from (Kazakhstan) Astana)
27	MF	CMR	Mbengono Yannick (from Debrecen)
81	FW	HUN	Péter Rajczi (from Újpest)
92	MF	ARG	Edgardo Díaz (from (Chile) Naval)
—	FW	HUN	Ádám Kovács (loan from Nyíregyháza)
—	MF	SRB	Milan Cokić (loan return from Siófok)

Out: Note: Flags indicate national team as defined under FIFA eligibility rules; some limited exceptions apply. Players may hold more than one non-FIFA nationality.

No.	Pos.	Nation	Player
6	DF	HUN	Béla Balogh (to Pécs)
14	MF	HUN	Balázs Farkas I
15	DF	ROU	Attila Gyagya (loan to Szolnok)
18	FW	CGO	Francis Litsingi (to (Czech Republic) Teplice)
19	FW	CIV	Sindou Dosso (to (Romania) UTA Arad)
20	MF	CTA	Foxi Kethevoama (to (Kazakhstan) Astana)
20	FW	BRA	Tarabai (to (Malta) Hibernians)
24	MF	HON	Luis Ramos (to Debrecen)
31	MF	CAN	Joseph Di Chiara (to (Russia) Torpedo Moscow)
88	DF	HUN	Viktor Tölgyesi (loan to Gyirmót)
—	DF	HUN	András Farkas (loan to Baja)
—	MF	SRB	Milan Cokić (loan to Baja)

=== Lombard-Pápa TFC ===
In: Note: Flags indicate national team as defined under FIFA eligibility rules; some limited exceptions apply. Players may hold more than one non-FIFA nationality.

No.	Pos.	Nation	Player
3	DF	ESP	Daniel Orozco (from (Greece) Asteras Tripolis)
7	FW	HUN	Máté Szolga (from (Netherlands) Twente U-19)
11	FW	HUN	Gergő Beliczky (from Ferencváros)
14	MF	HUN	Krisztián Dóczi (loan return from BKV Előre)
17	FW	CRO	Tino Lagator (from (Lithuania) Atlantas)
23	MF	BIH	Mahir Jasarević (loan from Zalaegerszeg)
50	FW	CIV	Georges Griffiths (loan from (Czech Republic) Sparta Prague)
91	MF	HUN	Tamás Tajthy (from Újpest)

Out: Note: Flags indicate national team as defined under FIFA eligibility rules; some limited exceptions apply. Players may hold more than one non-FIFA nationality.

No.	Pos.	Nation	Player
6	FW	SEN	Mouhamadou Seye (loan to Zalaegerszeg)
7	FW	HUN	András Simon (loan return to Győr)
8	MF	SVN	Jože Benko (to (Slovenia) Zavrč)
13	FW	HUN	István Ferenczi (to Gyirmót)
26	MF	HUN	Levente Horváth
55	DF	HUN	József Fellai (to Kozármisleny)
98	MF	MAR	Youssef Sekour (loan return to Diósgyőr)
99	FW	LVA	Aleksandrs Čekulajevs (to (Thailand) Lopburi)

=== MTK Budapest FC ===
In: Note: Flags indicate national team as defined under FIFA eligibility rules; some limited exceptions apply. Players may hold more than one non-FIFA nationality.

No.	Pos.	Nation	Player

Out: Note: Flags indicate national team as defined under FIFA eligibility rules; some limited exceptions apply. Players may hold more than one non-FIFA nationality.

No.	Pos.	Nation	Player
13	FW	HUN	Ádám Hrepka (to (Israel) Bnei Yehuda)
15	FW	SRB	Norbert Könyves (to Paks)
27	MF	SRB	Đorđe Đurić (loan to Tatabánya)

=== Paksi SE ===
In: Note: Flags indicate national team as defined under FIFA eligibility rules; some limited exceptions apply. Players may hold more than one non-FIFA nationality.

No.	Pos.	Nation	Player
1	GK	HUN	Gábor Németh (free agent)
8	DF	HUN	Gábor Kovács (from Eger)
17	DF	HUN	Dániel Juhász (from Zalaegerszeg)
23	GK	HUN	Máté Kiss (loan return from Veszprém)
26	FW	HUN	Attila Czinger (from Paks II)
42	FW	SRB	Norbert Könyves (from MTK Budapest)
92	MF	HUN	Norbert Pintér (from Paks II)
95	FW	HUN	János Hahn (from Paks U-19)

Out: Note: Flags indicate national team as defined under FIFA eligibility rules; some limited exceptions apply. Players may hold more than one non-FIFA nationality.

No.	Pos.	Nation	Player
1	GK	HUN	Attila Kovács (to Veszprém)
9	DF	HUN	Tamás Csehi (to Pálhalma)
22	MF	HUN	István Sipeki (to Szolnok)
28	GK	HUN	Péter Pokorni (to Szolnok)
99	FW	HUN	Attila Simon (to Pécs)

=== Pécsi Mecsek FC ===
In: Note: Flags indicate national team as defined under FIFA eligibility rules; some limited exceptions apply. Players may hold more than one non-FIFA nationality.

No.	Pos.	Nation	Player
4	DF	HUN	József Nagy (loan return from Kozármisleny)
6	DF	HUN	Béla Balogh (from Kecskemét)
9	FW	HUN	Krisztián Koller (from Kozármisleny)
20	DF	HUN	Pál Lázár (free agent)
99	FW	HUN	Attila Simon (from Paks)

Out: Note: Flags indicate national team as defined under FIFA eligibility rules; some limited exceptions apply. Players may hold more than one non-FIFA nationality.

No.	Pos.	Nation	Player
8	DF	SVN	Leon Panikvar (to (Slovenia) Aluminij)
14	MF	HUN	Dominik Nagy (loan to Kozármisleny)
22	DF	HUN	László Bodnár (to Nyíregyháza)
27	MF	HUN	Gábor Demjén (to Balmazújváros)
81	FW	HUN	Péter Bajzát (to Nyíregyháza)

=== Szombathelyi Haladás ===
In: Note: Flags indicate national team as defined under FIFA eligibility rules; some limited exceptions apply. Players may hold more than one non-FIFA nationality.

No.	Pos.	Nation	Player
—	FW	HUN	András Simon (loan from Győr)

Out: Note: Flags indicate national team as defined under FIFA eligibility rules; some limited exceptions apply. Players may hold more than one non-FIFA nationality.

No.	Pos.	Nation	Player
5	DF	HUN	Gábor Korolovszky (to Nyíregyháza)
21	MF	HUN	Dániel Nagy (loan return to Videoton)

=== Újpest FC ===
In: Note: Flags indicate national team as defined under FIFA eligibility rules; some limited exceptions apply. Players may hold more than one non-FIFA nationality.

No.	Pos.	Nation	Player
30	FW	HUN	Balázs Zamostny (loan return from Siófok)
32	MF	HUN	Tamás Egerszegi (loan return from Siófok)

Out: Note: Flags indicate national team as defined under FIFA eligibility rules; some limited exceptions apply. Players may hold more than one non-FIFA nationality.

No.	Pos.	Nation	Player
6	DF	HUN	Zoltán Takács (to Siófok)
8	FW	HUN	Péter Rajczi (to Kecskemét)
10	MF	HUN	Dávid Barczi (loan to (Belgium) St. Truidense)
11	FW	ISR	Yadin Zaris (loan return to (Belgium) Standard Liège)
28	MF	HUN	Tamás Tajthy (to Pápa)
30	FW	HUN	Balázs Zamostny (to Újpest II)
32	MF	HUN	Tamás Egerszegi (loan to (Belgium) St. Truidense)

=== Videoton FC ===
In: Note: Flags indicate national team as defined under FIFA eligibility rules; some limited exceptions apply. Players may hold more than one non-FIFA nationality.

No.	Pos.	Nation	Player
5	MF	POR	Vítor Gomes (loan from (Portugal) Rio Ave)
7	MF	BRA	Jeff Silva (loan return from Diósgyőr)
13	GK	SRB	Filip Pajović (from Puskás)
20	DF	HUN	Donát Zsótér (from Videoton U-19)
22	MF	HUN	Dániel Nagy (loan return from Szombathely)
23	MF	SLV	Arturo Alvarez (loan from (Portugal) Paços de Ferreira)
32	DF	HUN	Roland Juhász (loan from (Belgium) Anderlecht)

Out: Note: Flags indicate national team as defined under FIFA eligibility rules; some limited exceptions apply. Players may hold more than one non-FIFA nationality.

No.	Pos.	Nation	Player
7	MF	BRA	Jeff Silva (to (Brazil) ABC)
10	MF	BRA	Renato Neto (loan return to (Portugal) Sporting)
11	MF	HUN	György Sándor (loan to (Saudi Arabia) Al-Ittihad)
13	GK	HUN	Bence Somodi (to Puskás)
19	FW	HUN	László Lencse (loan to (Greece) Asteras Tripoli)
20	FW	ESP	Walter Fernández (to (Belgium) Lokeren)
22	MF	HUN	Dániel Nagy (loan to Puskás)

== Nemzeti Bajnokság II ==
=== Eastern Group ===
==== Balmazújvárosi FC ====
In: Note: Flags indicate national team as defined under FIFA eligibility rules; some limited exceptions apply. Players may hold more than one non-FIFA nationality.

No.	Pos.	Nation	Player
—	DF	HUN	Márton Szabó (loan return from Hajdúböszörmény)
—	MF	HUN	Gábor Demjén (from Pécs)

Out: Note: Flags indicate national team as defined under FIFA eligibility rules; some limited exceptions apply. Players may hold more than one non-FIFA nationality.

No.	Pos.	Nation	Player
14	MF	HUN	Szabolcs Sárközi

==== Békéscsaba 1912 Előre SE ====
In: Note: Flags indicate national team as defined under FIFA eligibility rules; some limited exceptions apply. Players may hold more than one non-FIFA nationality.

No.	Pos.	Nation	Player
5	DF	COL	Mario Llanos (loan from (Colombia) Deportivo Pereira)
20	FW	ROU	Adrian Hadar (loan from (Romania) Bihor Oradea)
24	DF	ROU	Calvin Ali-Tombaye (from (Romania) UTA Arad)

Out: Note: Flags indicate national team as defined under FIFA eligibility rules; some limited exceptions apply. Players may hold more than one non-FIFA nationality.

No.	Pos.	Nation	Player
3	DF	HUN	Zoltán Kiss (to Siófok)
5	DF	CRO	Mario Pufek
6	FW	HUN	József Balázs (loan to Orosháza)
17	DF	HUN	Zsolt Makra (loan to Orosháza)
20	DF	HUN	Miklós Balogh (loan to Szigetszentmiklós)
24	MF	ROU	Cornel Nădăban
—	GK	HUN	Tamás Balogh (to Cegléd)

==== Budapest Honvéd FC II ====
In: Note: Flags indicate national team as defined under FIFA eligibility rules; some limited exceptions apply. Players may hold more than one non-FIFA nationality.

No.	Pos.	Nation	Player
—	DF	HUN	Alexis Novák (from Budapest Honvéd)
—	DF	HUN	András Debreceni (from Budapest Honvéd)

Out: Note: Flags indicate national team as defined under FIFA eligibility rules; some limited exceptions apply. Players may hold more than one non-FIFA nationality.

No.	Pos.	Nation	Player
—	FW	HUN	Roland Vólent (loan to Kazincbarcika)
—	DF	GRE	Anatolis-Alexis Sundas (loan to (Italy) Hellas Verona Primavera)
—	DF	HUN	Ferenc Frohner (to (Austria) Ritzing)
—	MF	HUN	Attila Lőrinczy (to Budapest Honvéd)

==== Ceglédi VSE ====
In: Note: Flags indicate national team as defined under FIFA eligibility rules; some limited exceptions apply. Players may hold more than one non-FIFA nationality.

No.	Pos.	Nation	Player
—	DF	HUN	László Makrai (from Veszprém)
—	GK	HUN	Tamás Balogh (from Békéscsaba)
—	FW	HUN	Csongor Bata (from Paks II)
—	MF	HUN	Tamás Kiss (from Rákospalota)

Out: Note: Flags indicate national team as defined under FIFA eligibility rules; some limited exceptions apply. Players may hold more than one non-FIFA nationality.

No.	Pos.	Nation	Player
5	DF	HUN	Pál Balogh (Retired)
12	GK	HUN	János Bácskai (Retired)
23	MF	HUN	Tibor Halgas (loan return to Diósgyőr)

==== Debreceni VSC II ====
In: Note: Flags indicate national team as defined under FIFA eligibility rules; some limited exceptions apply. Players may hold more than one non-FIFA nationality.

No.	Pos.	Nation	Player
—	GK	HUN	Dániel Póser (loan return from Létavértes)
—	MF	HUN	Norbert Mokánszki (loan return from Létavértes)
—	MF	HUN	János Boros (loan return from Létavértes)
—	MF	HUN	Péter Berdó (loan return from Létavértes)
—	MF	HUN	Imre Kiss (loan return from Létavértes)
—	MF	HUN	Márk Treznai (loan return from Létavértes)
—	GK	HUN	József Patalenszki (loan return from DEAC)

Out: Note: Flags indicate national team as defined under FIFA eligibility rules; some limited exceptions apply. Players may hold more than one non-FIFA nationality.

No.	Pos.	Nation	Player
30	DF	HUN	Miklós Kovács (to Jászapáti)
—	MF	HUN	Norbert Mokánszki (to Siófok)
—	MF	HUN	János Boros (to Létavértes)
—	MF	HUN	Péter Berdó (to Létavértes)
—	GK	HUN	Dániel Póser (to Kazincbarcika)
—	MF	HUN	Márk Treznai (to Diósgyőr II)
—	MF	HUN	Imre Kiss

==== Ferencvárosi TC II ====
In: Note: Flags indicate national team as defined under FIFA eligibility rules; some limited exceptions apply. Players may hold more than one non-FIFA nationality.

No.	Pos.	Nation	Player
—	MF	HUN	Bence Lannert (loan return from Szigetszentmiklós)

Out: Note: Flags indicate national team as defined under FIFA eligibility rules; some limited exceptions apply. Players may hold more than one non-FIFA nationality.

No.	Pos.	Nation	Player
20	MF	HUN	Axel Tóth (to BKV Előre)
—	MF	HUN	Bence Lannert (loan to Soroksár)
—	FW	HUN	Szabolcs Gál (loan to Velence)
