= 2015–16 Rákospalotai EAC season =

Rákospalota
2015–16 season
- Owner: Tamás Forgács
- Manager: József Dzurják (until 16 October); Balázs Dinka (from 16 October)
- Stadium: Budai II. László Stadion
- Nemzeti Bajnokság III: 16th
- Magyar Kupa: Round of 128
- Top goalscorer: League: Tamás Kiss (8); All: Richárd Csiszár; Tamás Kiss (9 each)
Home colours

The 2015–16 season was Rákospalotai Egyetértés Atlétikai Club's or shortly REAC's 69th competitive season, 4th consecutive season in the Nemzeti Bajnokság III and 103rd year in existence as a football club. In addition to the domestic league, Rákospalota participated in this season's editions of the Magyar Kupa.

József Dzurják, who won the bronze medal last season, left the team after the defeat against Hatvan, and in his ten matches, the team managed only four draws and six defeats. Until the end of the autumn season, the current player-coach, Balázs Dinka, was in charge of REAC as caretaker manager, with the aim of avoiding relegation this season.

== First team squad ==
The players listed had league appearances and stayed until the end of the season.

Note: Flags indicate national team as defined under FIFA eligibility rules; some limited exceptions apply. Players may hold more than one non-FIFA nationality.

No.	Pos.	Nation	Player
1	GK	(Hungary) HUN	Gyula Kőhalmi
1	GK	(Hungary) HUN	Gergő Ordasi
2	DF	(Hungary) HUN	Balázs Dinka
2	MF	(Hungary) HUN	Zsolt Pálmai
3	DF	(Hungary) HUN	Bálint Szlezák
4	N/A	(Hungary) HUN	Sándor Krasznay
5	DF	(Hungary) HUN	Bálint Balázs
6	MF	(Hungary) HUN	Balázs Lászka
7	MF	(Hungary) HUN	Dániel Kasza
8	DF	(Hungary) HUN	György Radnai
9	FW	(Hungary) HUN	Patrik Czimmermann
9	MF	(Hungary) HUN	Dániel Lőrincz
9	FW	(Hungary) HUN	Levente Spánitz
10	MF	(Hungary) HUN	Tamás Kiss
11	FW	(Hungary) HUN	Richárd Csiszár

No.	Pos.	Nation	Player
12	DF	(Hungary) HUN	Gergő Nagy
13	MF	(Hungary) HUN	Gábor Borsos
13	FW	(Hungary) HUN	Kristóf Csete
13	FW	(Hungary) HUN	György Papp
13	MF	(Hungary) HUN	Bence Szántovszki
14	DF	(Hungary) HUN	Zsolt Kollár
15	MF	(Hungary) HUN	Erik Pfister
16	N/A	(Hungary) HUN	Dávid Hornok
16	N/A	(Hungary) HUN	Balázs Varró
17	MF	(Hungary) HUN	Viktor Lucz
18	MF	(Hungary) HUN	Dávid Pásztor
18	N/A	(Hungary) HUN	Sándor Rácz
19	DF	(Hungary) HUN	Tamás Illés
19	N/A	(Hungary) HUN	Márk Imecz

== Transfers ==
=== Transfers in ===
Date	Pos.	No.	Player	From	Ref
20 July 2015	MF	7	(Hungary) Dániel Kasza	Kazincbarcika	
20 July 2015	GK	1	(Hungary) Gergő Ordasi	Vasas	
20 July 2015	DF	8	(Hungary) György Radnai	Vecsés	
30 July 2015	N/A	19	(Hungary) Márk Imecz	Újpest	
31 July 2015	FW	9	(Hungary) Szabolcs Németh	Vasas	
3 August 2015	DF	19	(Hungary) Tamás Illés	Honvéd	
3 August 2015	N/A	16	(Hungary) Hunor Nagy	Bozsik Akadémia Nyíregyháza	
13 August 2015	N/A	16	(Hungary) Balázs Varró	Kecskeméti LC	
26 August 2015	DF	5	(Hungary) Gábor Vass	Videoton	
1 October 2015	N/A	16	(Hungary) Maximilián Oláh	Újpest	
5 February 2016	MF	9	(Hungary) Dániel Lőrincz	III. Kerület	
5 February 2016	DF	12	(Hungary) Gergő Nagy	Ferencváros	
10 February 2016	FW	9	(Hungary) Patrik Czimmermann	Somos	
17 February 2016	N/A	18	(Hungary) Sándor Rácz	Vasas	
17 February 2016	FW	9	(Hungary) Levente Spánitz	Dunaújváros	

=== Transfers out ===
Date	Pos.	No.	Player	To	Ref
6 July 2015	DF	4	(Hungary) Ádám Baranyai	Csákvár	
27 July 2015	FW	7	(Hungary) Máté Fézler	BKV Előre	
30 July 2015	DF	13	(Hungary) László Emperger	Balatonfüred	
3 August 2015	MF	3	(Hungary) Balázs Olay	Veresegyház	
4 August 2015	N/A	18	(Hungary) Dávid Mándoki	Voyage	
24 August 2015	GK	13	(Hungary) Máté Drávucz	Újpest II	
25 August 2015	MF	8	(Serbia) Nemanja Perendić	(Serbia) Srbobran	
16 September 2015	N/A	13	(Hungary) Tamás Grót	Újbuda II	
26 January 2016	MF	9	(Hungary) Imre Nagy	Nyírgyulaj	
9 February 2016	DF	19	(Hungary) Dávid Labát	Kozármisleny	
12 February 2016	FW	9	(Hungary) Szabolcs Németh	Cigánd	
22 February 2016	N/A	12	(Hungary) Soma Klein	Mogyoród	
22 February 2016	N/A	11	(Hungary) Richárd Vizi	Maglód	
1 March 2016	GK	1	(Ukraine) Vladyslav Chanhelia	(Georgia (country)) Odishi 1919	

=== Loans in ===
Start date	End date	Pos.	No.	Player	From	Ref

=== Loans out ===
Start date	End date	Pos.	No.	Player	To	Ref

== Friendlies ==
14 July 2015 Friendly	Hatvan	0–1	Rákospalota	Hatvan
18:00 CEST (UTC+2)		Report	S. Németh 45'; M. Jakab (yellow card) 63'; S. Klein (yellow card) 81'	Stadium: Népkert Sporttelep

22 July 2015 Friendly	Nyíregyháza	5–1	Rákospalota	Nyíregyháza
	Rezes 20', 33', 46'; Pölöskei 52'; Abdouraman 83' (pen.)	Report	R. Csiszár 81'	Stadium: Városi Stadion

6 September 2015 Friendly	Rákospalota	1–4	Soroksár	Budapest
		Report	B. Szenes (2); Z. Tóbiás; P. Zsivóczky	Stadium: Budai II. László Stadion

22 January 2016 Friendly	Mezőkövesd	2–3	Rákospalota	Mezőkövesd
	G. Molnár; B. Tóth	Report		Stadium: Városi Stadion; Attendance: 150; Referee: Gábor Kátai

== Competitions ==
=== Overview ===
Competition	First match	Last match	Starting round	Final position	Record							
Competition	First match	Last match	Starting round	Final position	Pld	W	D	L	GF	GA	GD	Win %
Nemzeti Bajnokság III	1 August 2015	5 June 2016	Matchday 1	16th	32	6	6	20	36	73	−37	18.75
Magyar Kupa	5 August 2015	5 August 2015	Round of 128	Round of 128	1	0	0	1	3	4	−1	0.00
Total					33	6	6	21	39	77	−38	18.18

Source: Competitions

=== Nemzeti Bajnokság III ===
==== League table ====
Pos	Team	Pld	W	D	L	GF	GA	GD	Pts	Promotion or relegation
13	Tállya	32	6	7	19	31	54	−23	25	
14	Nyírbátor	32	6	7	19	30	68	−38	25	
15	Tiszaújváros	32	5	10	17	24	52	−28	25	
16	Rákospalota	32	6	6	20	36	73	−37	24	
17	Felsőtárkány (R)	32	5	6	21	28	74	−46	21	Relegation to Megyei Bajnokság I

Source: HFF
Rules for classification: 1) Points; 2) Matches won; 3) Goal difference; 4) Goals scored; 5) Head-to-head points; 6) Head-to-head goal difference; 7) Head-to-head away goals scored; 8) Fair play ranking; 9) Drawing of lots.
(R) Relegated

==== Results summary ====
Overall								Home						Away					
Pld	W	D	L	GF	GA	GD	Pts	W	D	L	GF	GA	GD	W	D	L	GF	GA	GD
32	6	6	20	36	73	−37	24	3	5	8	20	34	−14	3	1	12	16	39	−23

Source: HFF

==== Results by round ====
Round	1	2	3	4	5	6	7	8	9	10	11	12	13	14	15	16	17	18	19	20	21	22	23	24	25	26	27	28	29	30	31	32
Ground	A	H	A	H	A	H	A	H	A	H	A	H	A	H	A	H	H	A	H	A	H	A	H	A	H	A	H	A	H	A	H	A
Result	D	D	L	D	L	L	L	D	L	L	L	L	W	L	W	L	W	W	W	L	L	L	L	L	W	L	D	L	L	L	D	L
Position	8	10	13	13	14	15	16	15	16	17	17	17	16	16	16	16	15	14	12	14	14	14	15	15	13	13	13	13	15	15	15	16
Points	1	2	2	3	3	3	3	4	4	4	4	4	7	7	10	10	13	16	19	19	19	19	19	19	22	22	23	23	23	23	24	24

Source: Matches
A = Away; H = Home; W = Win; D = Draw; L = Loss

==== Matches ====
1 August 2015 1	Felsőtárkány	2–2	Rákospalota	Felsőtárkány
16:30 CEST (UTC+2)	R. Kálmán (yellow card) 19', (goal) 27'; D. Reznek 30'; N. Kaszás (yellow card) 54'; B. Zsély (yellow card) 58'; Dán. Nagy (yellow card) 70'	Report	V. Lucz (yellow card) 18'; Kasza 35'; Z. Kollár 53'; Kiss (yellow card) 60'	Stadium: Felsőtárkány SC Sporttelep; Attendance: 360; Referee: Gergő Bogár

8 August 2015 2	Rákospalota	2–2	Putnok	Budapest
19:00 CEST (UTC+2)	Lászka (yellow card) 15'; Z. Kollár 19'; G. Borsos (yellow card) 44'; Kiss 56', (yellow card) 59'; V. Lucz (yellow card) 67'; E. Pfister (yellow card) 78'	Report	Má. Molnár (yellow card) 18'; A. Bene 37'; D. Nyisalovits (red card) 61'; Á. Zimányi 69'	Stadium: Budai II. László Stadion; Attendance: 200; Referee: Tibor Horváth

15 August 2015 3	Tállya	3–0	Rákospalota	Tállya
17:30 CEST (UTC+2)	B. Horváth 31'; D. Németh (yellow card) 53'; D. Nyitrai (yellow card) 63'; B. Németh (yellow card) 73'; T. Orosz 77', (yellow card) 82'; M. Varga 87'	Report	V. Lucz (yellow card) 43'; Lászka (yellow card) 50'; R. Csiszár (yellow card) 82'	Stadium: Községi Sporttelep; Attendance: 250; Referee: Sándor Szilágyi

22 August 2015 4	Rákospalota	1–1	Somos	Budapest
19:00 CEST (UTC+2)	Z. Pálmai (yellow card) 25'; Kiss (yellow card) 44'; Kasza 81'; Lászka (yellow card) 90'	Report	P. Czimmermann 36'; Albert (yellow card) 55'; G. Liszka (yellow card) 65'; N. Novák (yellow card) 88'; D. Debreceni (yellow card) 90+3'	Stadium: Budai II. László Stadion; Attendance: 150; Referee: Márió Görög

29 August 2015 5	Cigánd	3–0	Rákospalota	Cigánd
17:30 CEST (UTC+2)	Katona 11', (yellow card) 59'; K. Varga (yellow card) 25'; Baksa (yellow card) 49'; R. Popescu 54'; Roszel 85'; E. Kinczel (red card) 90+1'	Report	Dinka (yellow card) 23'; E. Pfister (yellow card) 27'; Lászka (yellow card) 45'; Z. Kollár (yellow card) 80'	Stadium: Városi Stadion; Attendance: 300; Referee: Norbert Nagy

13 September 2015 6	Rákospalota	1–3	Újpest II	Budapest
19:00 CEST (UTC+2)	Kiss 80'; Lászka (yellow card) 81'	Report	Bardhi 60'; Pávkovics (yellow card) 68'; P. Tóth 69', 89'; S. Molnár (yellow card) 73'	Stadium: Budai II. László Stadion; Referee: Bence József Györki

20 September 2015 7	Diósgyőr II	3–0	Rákospalota	Miskolc
16:00 CEST (UTC+2)	I. Kádas (yellow card) 19'; K. Kövér (yellow card) 47'; Lipták 52'; M. Galambosi (yellow card) 62'; G. Mátyás 66', 68'	Report	D. Pásztor (yellow card) 32'; Kiss (yellow card) 70'; Z. Kollár (yellow card) 74'	Stadium: Diósgyőri Stadion; Attendance: 200; Referee: Gergő Bogár

26 September 2015 8	Rákospalota	1–1	Rákosmente	Budapest
18:00 CEST (UTC+2)	Kiss 31', (yellow card) 55'; G. Borsos (red card) 90+4'; G. Ordasi (yellow card) 90+4'	Report	C. Balaskó (yellow card) 5'; T. Molnár (yellow card) 50'; B. Törőcsik (yellow card) 60'; R. Kis (yellow card) 81'; Király 89'	Stadium: Budai II. László Stadion; Referee: Tibor Horváth

3 October 2015 9	Kazincbarcika	6–0	Rákospalota	Kazincbarcika
15:00 CEST (UTC+2)	Farkas 7', 10', 36', 42'; Faggyas 16'; Lakatos 90+1'	Report	Z. Pálmai (yellow card) 36'; S. Klein (yellow card) 72'; Z. Kollár (yellow card) 90+1'	Stadium: Pete András Stadion; Attendance: 250; Referee: László Sipos

10 October 2015 10	Rákospalota	1–2	Hatvan	Budapest
17:00 CEST (UTC+2)	Kiss (yellow card) 40'; Bá. Balázs (yellow card) 62'; S. Németh 86'	Report	Á. Gyarmati (yellow card) 13'; G. Barthel (yellow card) 47', (goal) 82'; R. Ficsor 51'; M. Purzsa (yellow card) 52'; R. Szabó (yellow card) 90'	Stadium: Budai II. László Stadion; Attendance: 100; Referee: Márió Görög

18 October 2015 11	Debrecen II	1–0	Rákospalota	Debrecen
14:30 CEST (UTC+2)	Szécsi (yellow card) 55'; Á. Vincze (yellow card) 66'; K. Kondás (yellow card) 74'; Szatmári (yellow card) 76'; Castillion 87'	Report	T. Illés (yellow card) 68'	Stadium: Oláh Gábor utcai Stadion; Referee: Dávid Csontos

24 October 2015 12	Rákospalota	0–2	Nyíregyháza	Budapest
17:00 CEST (UTC+2)	Bá. Balázs (yellow card) 18'; Kiss (yellow card) 56'	Report	Törtei (yellow card) 16'; Rezes 36', 63'; K. Kapacina (yellow card) 67'; Rubus (yellow card) 69'; Ovsiyenko (yellow card) 72'	Stadium: Budai II. László Stadion; Attendance: 100; Referee: Dr Géza Jakab

31 October 2015 13	Nyírbátor	0–2	Rákospalota	Nyírbátor
13:30 CEST (UTC+2)	B. Pálvölgyi (yellow card) 54'	Report	R. Csiszár 50'; V. Lucz (yellow card) 54'; S. Németh 56'; Bá. Balázs (yellow card) 87'	Stadium: Nyírbátori LSE Sporttelep; Attendance: 150; Referee: Attila Bálint

7 November 2015 14	Rákospalota	0–5	Jászberény	Budapest
17:00 CEST (UTC+2)	T. Illés (yellow card) 28'; Bá. Balázs (yellow card) 73'; E. Pfister (red card) 76'	Report	I. Nichenko 29', 58'; Mile 41'; A. Bálint 67', (yellow card) 78'; M. Ludasi 90'	Stadium: Budai II. László Stadion; Attendance: 200; Referee: Katalin Sipos

14 November 2015 15	Tiszaújváros	1–2	Rákospalota	Tiszaújváros
13:30 CEST (UTC+2)	P. Fodor (yellow card) 11'; T. Polényi (yellow card) 43'; I. Hajdu 45'; S. Kovács (yellow card) 80'	Report	R. Csiszár 4'; M. Imecz 47'; T. Illés (yellow card) 61'; Kiss (yellow card) 83'	Stadium: Tiszaújváros Sportcentrum; Attendance: 150; Referee: Bence József Györki

21 November 2015 16	Rákospalota	1–3	Cegléd	Budapest
15:00 CEST (UTC+2)	Z. Kollár (yellow card) 15'; Kiss (red card) 75'; Lászka (yellow card) 82'; R. Csiszár (yellow card) 88', (goal) 90'	Report	Si. Csordás 28'; V. Szkunc (yellow card) 30'; Sz. Csordás (yellow card) 47'; C. Peres (yellow card) 69'; M. Laczkó 81'; I. Buczkó (yellow card) 89'; Á. Füle 90+2'	Stadium: Budai II. László Stadion; Referee: Attila Bálint

13 February 2016 17	Rákospalota	2–0	Felsőtárkány	Budapest
15:00 CEST (UTC+2)	Z. Kollár 29'; R. Csiszár 34'; Z. Pálmai (yellow card) 89'; Lászka (yellow card) 90+2'	Report	P. Bocsi (yellow card) 28'; Ma. Molnár (yellow card) 65'; K. Orlóczki (yellow card) 90+1'	Stadium: Budai II. László Stadion; Attendance: 100; Referee: Ádám Leél-Őssy

20 February 2016 18	Putnok	2–3	Rákospalota	Múcsony
14:00 CEST (UTC+2)	L. Lázi (yellow card) 15'; A. Süttő (yellow card) 34'; Á. Botló (yellow card) 46'; A. Bene 49'; Á. Zimányi (yellow card) 75', (goal) 80'; J. Madarász (yellow card) 90+2'	Report	Bá. Balázs (yellow card) 34', (goal) 74'; Z. Pálmai 40', (yellow card) 40'; D. Lőrincz 58'; R. Csiszár (yellow card) 86'	Stadium: Sajóvölgye Focisuli Sportpálya; Attendance: 200; Referee: Bence József Györki

27 February 2016 19	Rákospalota	2–1	Tállya	Budapest
15:00 CEST (UTC+2)	L. Spánitz (yellow card) 13'; Kasza (yellow card) 31', (goal) 42'; Lászka (yellow card) 66'; G. Nagy 71'	Report	G. Bihari 29'; B. Németh (yellow card) 49'; S. Tóth (yellow card) 65'	Stadium: Budai II. László Stadion; Attendance: 200; Referee: Tibor Horváth

5 March 2016 20	Somos	2–1	Rákospalota	Salgótarján
14:30 CEST (UTC+2)	M. Köböl (yellow card) 22'; Albert (yellow card) 34'; D. Kiprich (yellow card) 40', (goal) 62'; D. Szekér (red card) 55'; Dóczi (yellow card) 74'; T. Romhányi (yellow card) 80'; R. Csóka 90+3'	Report	P. Czimmermann (yellow card) 59'; Z. Kollár 66'; R. Csiszár (yellow card) 74'; V. Lucz (yellow card) 80'	Stadium: Tó-strandi Sporttelep; Attendance: 230; Referee: Gábor Kátai

12 March 2016 21	Rákospalota	2–3	Cigánd	Budapest
16:00 CEST (UTC+2)	Z. Kollár 18'; D. Lőrincz (red card) 88'; Kiss 90'	Report	E. Kinczel 8', (red card) 90+4'; Baksa (yellow card) 18'; S. Kis 52', (yellow card) 65'; A. Burics (red card) 74'; Roszel (yellow card) 90+1', (goal) 90+4'	Stadium: Budai II. László Stadion; Attendance: 300; Referee: Árpád Jakab

27 March 2016 22	Újpest II	3–1	Rákospalota	Budapest
11:00 CEST (UTC+2)	Á. Gögitz (yellow card) 18'; Be. Balázs 23', 85'; T. Knap (yellow card) 42'; B. Nyilas (yellow card) 57'; Z. Gere 71'	Report	Z. Pálmai (yellow card) 44'; Kiss 74'; Kasza (yellow card) 80'; T. Illés (yellow card) 84'; Z. Kollár (yellow card) 88'	Stadium: Szusza Ferenc Stadion; Referee: Tibor Horváth

3 April 2016 23	Rákospalota	0–3	Diósgyőr II	Budapest
17:00 CEST (UTC+2)	G. Ordasi (yellow card) 11'; G. Nagy (yellow card) 36'; P. Pásztor (yellow card) 79'	Report	B. Szabó 11'; K. Kövér 27'; Z. Icsó 38'; Mahalek (yellow card) 44'; Eperjesi (yellow card) 52'; I. Timkó (yellow card) 74'	Stadium: Budai II. László Stadion; Attendance: 150; Referee: Ákos Gaál

9 April 2016 24	Rákosmente	3–1	Rákospalota	Budapest
16:30 CEST (UTC+2)	S. Pap (yellow card) 1'; B. Vattai 24', 25'; L. Horváth (yellow card) 31'; Fitos 45'; Király (yellow card) 77'; Szűcs (yellow card) 90'	Report	G. Nagy (yellow card) 20'; Z. Kollár 32'; G. Borsos (yellow card) 36'; R. Csiszár (yellow card) 74'; Lászka (yellow card) 90'	Stadium: Riz Levente Sportcsarnok; Referee: Bálint Dolnegó

16 April 2016 25	Rákospalota	2–1	Kazincbarcika	Budapest
17:00 CEST (UTC+2)	Z. Kollár 41' (pen.); S. Krasznay 85'	Report	Farkas 10'; Irhás (yellow card) 16'; P. Nagy (red card) 89'	Stadium: Budai II. László Stadion; Attendance: 150; Referee: Tamás Sipos

23 April 2016 26	Hatvan	2–0	Rákospalota	Hatvan
17:00 CEST (UTC+2)	G. Barthel (yellow card) 50'; M. Ács (yellow card) 55'; D. Karácsony (yellow card) 62'; T. Kész (yellow card) 78', (goal) 89'; R. Ficsor 82'	Report	D. Pásztor (yellow card) 29'; G. Kőhalmi (yellow card) 45'; Bá. Balázs (yellow card) 78'	Stadium: Népkert Sporttelep; Attendance: 200; Referee: Tamás Berényi

1 May 2016 27	Rákospalota	2–2	Debrecen II	Budapest
16:00 CEST (UTC+2)	G. Borsos (yellow card) 51'; V. Lucz 54', (yellow card) 90+2'; R. Csiszár 84'; Z. Kollár (yellow card) 86'	Report	D. Székely (yellow card) 12'; T. Sándor (yellow card) 34'; E. Pfister 35' (o.g.); Kertész 61', (yellow card) 69'; G. Lénárt (yellow card) 84'; Szatmári (yellow card) 86'; Kinyik (red card) 90+2'	Stadium: Budai II. László Stadion; Referee: Miklós Bereczki

8 May 2016 28	Nyíregyháza	3–1	Rákospalota	Nyíregyháza
17:30 CEST (UTC+2)	Pölöskei 3', 15', 32', (yellow card) 26'; Harsányi (yellow card) 45'; Abdouraman (yellow card) 70'	Report	G. Nagy (yellow card) 2'; R. Csiszár 5'; Z. Kollár (yellow card) 45'; Lászka (yellow card) 51'	Stadium: Városi Stadion; Attendance: 1,000; Referee: Gábor Kátai

14 May 2016 29	Rákospalota	2–4	Nyírbátor	Budapest
18:00 CEST (UTC+2)	T. Illés (yellow card) 16'; G. Nagy (yellow card) 53'; Kiss 63' (pen.), 75'; B. Varró (yellow card) 80'	Report	Z. Kollár 26' (o.g.); Dáv. Nagy 44'; S. Szilágyi (yellow card) 63', (goal) 81'; I. Török 73'; L. Lakatos (yellow card) 90+2'	Stadium: Budai II. László Stadion; Attendance: 150; Referee: László Lovas

21 May 2016 30	Jászberény	2–1	Rákospalota	Jászberény
18:00 CEST (UTC+2)	R. Kis 17'; S. Sorecz (yellow card) 47'; Mile 56'	Report	R. Csiszár 14'; G. Borsos (red card) 82'	Stadium: Városi Stadion; Attendance: 150; Referee: Péter Antal

29 May 2016 31	Rákospalota	1–1	Tiszaújváros	Budapest
18:00 CEST (UTC+2)	R. Csiszár (yellow card) 31'; Z. Pálmai (yellow card) 44'; D. Pásztor 86'	Report	L. Molnár (yellow card) 14'; N. Angyal 82'	Stadium: Budai II. László Stadion; Attendance: 400; Referee: Dr Gergely Kovács

5 June 2016 32	Cegléd	3–2	Rákospalota	Cegléd
18:00 CEST (UTC+2)	Á. Markó 45', 53', 89'; Popovics (yellow card) 67'; D. Pozsár (yellow card) 88'	Report	G. Nagy (yellow card) 24'; Bá. Balázs 47', (yellow card) 68'; Kiss 84'	Stadium: Zsengellér Gyula Sportcentrum; Attendance: 700; Referee: Gergő Bogár

=== Magyar Kupa ===
5 August 2015 Round of 128	Nagyecsed	4–3	Rákospalota	Nagyecsed
17:00 CEST (UTC+2)	D. Ladányi 4', (yellow card) 49'; L. Ascsillán 9'; R. Ádámszki 23', 43'; F. Ricsei (yellow card) 64'; Z. Dobos (yellow card) 83'; A. Bulyáki (yellow card) 90+2'	Report	R. Csiszár 2', 45'; G. Ordasi (yellow card) 3'; Kiss 65'; M. Imecz (yellow card) 90+4'	Stadium: Nagyecsed RSE Sporttelep; Attendance: 400; Referee: Tamás Nazsa

== Statistics ==
=== Overall ===
Appearances (Apps) numbers are for appearances in competitive games only, including sub appearances.
Source: Competitions

No.	Player	Pos.	Nemzeti Bajnokság III				Magyar Kupa				Total			
No.	Player	Pos.	Apps	Goal	Booked	Sent off (straight red)	Apps	Goal	Booked	Sent off (straight red)	Apps	Goal	Booked	Sent off (straight red)
1	(Hungary) Gyula Kőhalmi	GK	6		1						6		1	
1	(Hungary) Gergő Ordasi	GK	26		2		1		1		27		3	
2	(Hungary) Balázs Dinka	DF	4		1						4		1	
2	(Hungary) Zsolt Pálmai	MF	27	1	6		1				28	1	6	
3	(Hungary) Bálint Szlezák	DF	13				1				14			
4	(Hungary) Sándor Krasznay		8	1							8	1		
5	(Hungary) Bálint Balázs	DF	19	2	7						19	2	7	
5	(Hungary) Arnold Kollár													
5	(Hungary) Gábor Vass	DF												
6	(Hungary) Balázs Lászka	MF	30		10		1				31		10	
7	(Hungary) Dániel Kasza	MF	31	3	2		1				32	3	2	
8	(Hungary) György Radnai	DF	8				1				9			
9	(Hungary) Patrik Czimmermann	FW	5		1						5		1	
9	(Hungary) Dániel Lőrincz	MF	6	1		1					6	1		1
9	(Hungary) Szabolcs Németh	FW	12	2			1				13	2		
9	(Hungary) Levente Spánitz	FW	5		1						5		1	
10	(Hungary) Tamás Kiss	MF	23	8	8	1	1	1			24	9	8	1
11	(Hungary) Richárd Csiszár	FW	31	7	6		1	2			32	9	6	
12	(Hungary) Soma Klein		2		1						2		1	
12	(Hungary) Gergő Nagy	DF	16	1	5						16	1	5	
13	(Hungary) Gábor Borsos	MF	16		3	2					16		3	2
13	(Hungary) Kristóf Csete	FW	2								2			
13	(Hungary) György Papp	FW	2								2			
13	(Hungary) Bence Szántovszki	MF	1								1			
14	(Hungary) Zsolt Kollár	DF	30	7	7		1				31	7	7	
15	(Hungary) Erik Pfister	MF	23		2	1	1				24		2	1
16	(Hungary) Dávid Hornok		1								1			
16	(Hungary) Hunor Nagy													
16	(Hungary) Maximilián Oláh													
16	(Hungary) Balázs Varró		2		1						2		1	
17	(Hungary) Viktor Lucz	MF	28	1	6		1				29	1	6	
18	(Hungary) Dávid Pásztor	MF	20	1	3		1				21	1	3	
18	(Hungary) Sándor Rácz		2								2			
19	(Hungary) Tamás Illés	DF	22		5						22		5	
19	(Hungary) Márk Imecz		13	1			1		1		14	1	1	
22	(Hungary) Máté Kléner													
22	(Hungary) Ferenc Polyák													
Own goals														
Totals				36	78	5		3	2			39	80	5

=== Clean sheets ===
			Clean sheets		
No.	Player	Games Played	Nemzeti Bajnokság III	Magyar Kupa	Total
1	(Hungary) Gergő Ordasi	27	2	0	2
1	(Hungary) Gyula Kőhalmi	6	0		0
Totals			2	0	2
