= Palásthy =

Palásthy is a Hungarian surname. Notable people with the name include:

- Dávid Palásthy (born 1990), Hungarian footballer
- Norbert Palásthy (born 1981), Hungarian footballer
