= Zvara =

Zvara is a surname. Notable people with the surname include:

- Dávid Zvara (born 1994), Hungarian footballer
- Ján Zvara (born 1963), Slovak high jumper
- Vladislav Zvara (born 1971), Slovak footballer
