= Dániel Kasza =

Hungarian footballer (born 1994)

Personal information
- Date of birth: 1 August 1994 (age 32)
- Place of birth: Eger, Hungary
- Height: 1.75 m (5 ft 9 in)
- Position: Midfielder

Team information
- Current team: III. Kerület II
- Number: 18

Youth career
- 2003–2006: Eger Plutó
- 2006–2012: Eger
- 2014: Felsőtárkány
- 2015: Kazincbarcika

Senior career*
Years	Team	Apps	(Gls)
2011	Eger	2	(0)
2011–2012	Egerszalók	14	(3)
2012–2013	Eger	5	(0)
2012–2013	Eger II	18	(1)
2013–2015	Felsőtárkány	39	(4)
2015	Kazincbarcika	12	(0)
2015–2016	Rákospalota	31	(3)
2016–2017	Cigánd	29	(0)
2017–2019	Rákospalota	60	(48)
2019–2022	Kelen	33	(10)
2021	Kelen II	3	(3)
2022	Pénzügyőr	7	(3)
2022–2023	Rákospalota	7	(3)
2023–2025	Wiesfleck	36	(15)
2025	Zuberbach	0	(0)
2025–	III. Kerület II	2	(6)
- * Club domestic league appearances and goals as of 14 September 2025

Dániel Kasza (born 1 August 1994) is a Hungarian professional footballer, who plays as a midfielder for Megyei Bajnokság III club III. Kerület II.

== Club statistics ==
As of match played 14 September 2025

Appearances and goals by club, season and competition
Club	Season	League			National cup (Note: Includes Magyar Kupa)		League cup (Note: Includes Ligakupa)		Other		Total	
Club	Season	Division	Apps	Goals	Apps	Goals	Apps	Goals	Apps	Goals	Apps	Goals
Eger	2010–11	Nemzeti Bajnokság III	2	0	—		—		1 (Note: Appearance in Magyar Kupa qualifying rounds)	0	3	0
Egerszalók	2011–12	Megyei Bajnokság I	14	3	—		—		—		14	3
Eger	2012–13	Nemzeti Bajnokság I	5	0	0	0	4	0	—		9	0
Eger II	2012–13	Nemzeti Bajnokság III	18	1	—		—		—		18	1
Felsőtárkány	2013–14	Nemzeti Bajnokság III	24	4	2	1	—		—		26	5
Felsőtárkány	2014–15	Nemzeti Bajnokság III	15	0	1	1	—		—		16	1
Felsőtárkány	Total		39	4	3	2	—		—		42	6
Kazincbarcika	2014–15	Nemzeti Bajnokság III	12	0	—		—		—		12	0
Rákospalota	2015–16	Nemzeti Bajnokság III	31	3	1	0	—		—		32	3
Cigánd	2016–17	Nemzeti Bajnokság II	29	0	1	0	—		—		30	0
Rákospalota	2017–18	Megyei Bajnokság I	30	23	—		—		8 (Note: One appearance in Magyar Kupa qualifying rounds, five appearances and seven goals in Budapest Kupa, two appearances in Megyei Bajnokság I promotion play-offs)	7	38	30
Rákospalota	2018–19	Megyei Bajnokság I	30	25	—		—		5 (Note: One appearance in Magyar Kupa qualifying rounds, four appearances and five goals in Budapest Kupa)	5	35	30
Rákospalota	Total		60	48	—		—		13	12	73	60
Kelen	2019–20	Nemzeti Bajnokság III	19	4	1	0	—		—		20	4
Kelen	2020–21	Megyei Bajnokság I	12	6	—		—		4 (Note: One appearance and one goal in Magyar Kupa qualifying rounds, three appearances and two goals in Budapest Kupa)	3	16	9
Kelen	2021–22	Nemzeti Bajnokság III	2	0	—		—		—		2	0
Kelen	Total		33	10	1	0	—		4	3	38	13
Kelen II	2021–22	Megyei Bajnokság II	3	3	—		—		—		3	3
Pénzügyőr	2021–22	Megyei Bajnokság I	7	3	—		—		2 (Note: Appearances in Megyei Bajnokság I promotion play-offs)	0	9	3
Rákospalota	2022–23	Megyei Bajnokság I	7	3	2	0	—		1 (Note: Appearance in Budapest Kupa)	0	10	3
Wiesfleck	2022–23	1. Klasse Süd	12	3	—		—		—		12	3
Wiesfleck	2023–24	1. Klasse Süd	24	12	—		—		—		24	12
Wiesfleck	Total		36	15	—		—		—		36	15
III. Kerület II	2025–26	Megyei Bajnokság III	2	6	—		—		—		2	6
Career total			298	99	8	2	4	0	21	15	331	116

== Honours ==
Eger

- Nemzeti Bajnokság III – Mátra: 2010–11

Rákospalota

- Megyei Bajnokság I – Budapest: 2017–18
- Budapest Kupa: 2017–18; runner-up: 2018–19

Pénzügyőr

- Megyei Bajnokság I – Budapest: 2021–22
