= Ádám Farkas (footballer) =

Hungarian footballer

Personal information
- Full name: Ádám Farkas
- Date of birth: 9 November 1987 (age 39)
- Place of birth: Budapest, Hungary
- Height: 1.73 m (5 ft 8 in)
- Position: Midfielder

Team information
- Current team: Nyíregyháza
- Number: 10

Youth career
- 2002–2006: MTK

Senior career*
Years	Team	Apps	(Gls)
2006–2011	Budaörs	140	(18)
2011–2013	Eger	53	(11)
2013–	Nyíregyháza	1	(2)
- * Club domestic league appearances and goals as of 15 September 2013

Ádám Farkas (born 9 November 1987 in Budapest) is a Hungarian football forward player who plays for Nyíregyháza Spartacus.

== Career ==
He made his Nemzeti Bajnokság I debut on 27 July 2012 in a 4–2 defeat to Szombathelyi Haladás

== Career statistics ==
Appearances and goals by club, season and competition
Club	Season	League			Cup		League Cup		Europe		Total	
Club	Season	Division	Apps	Goals	Apps	Goals	Apps	Goals	Apps	Goals	Apps	Goals
Budaörs
Budaörs	2006–07	Nemzeti Bajnokság II	27	4	0	0	0	0	0	0	27	4
Budaörs	2007–08	Nemzeti Bajnokság II	28	4	2	0	0	0	0	0	30	4
Budaörs	2008–09	Nemzeti Bajnokság II	29	2	1	0	10	0	0	0	40	2
Budaörs	2009–10	Nemzeti Bajnokság II	26	3	2	1	0	0	0	0	28	4
Budaörs	2010–11	Nemzeti Bajnokság II	30	5	2	0	0	0	0	0	32	5
Budaörs	Total		140	18	7	1	10	0	0	0	157	19
Eger
Eger	2011–12	Nemzeti Bajnokság II	28	8	2	1	0	0	0	0	30	9
Eger	2012–13	Nemzeti Bajnokság I	25	3	1	0	4	0	0	0	30	3
Eger	Total		53	11	3	1	4	0	0	0	60	12
Nyíregyháza	2013–14	Nemzeti Bajnokság II	1	2	1	1	0	0	0	0	2	3
Career total			195	31	11	3	14	0	0	0	220	34

Updated to games played as of 15 September 2013.
