= Hervé Tchami =

Cameroonian footballer (born 1988)

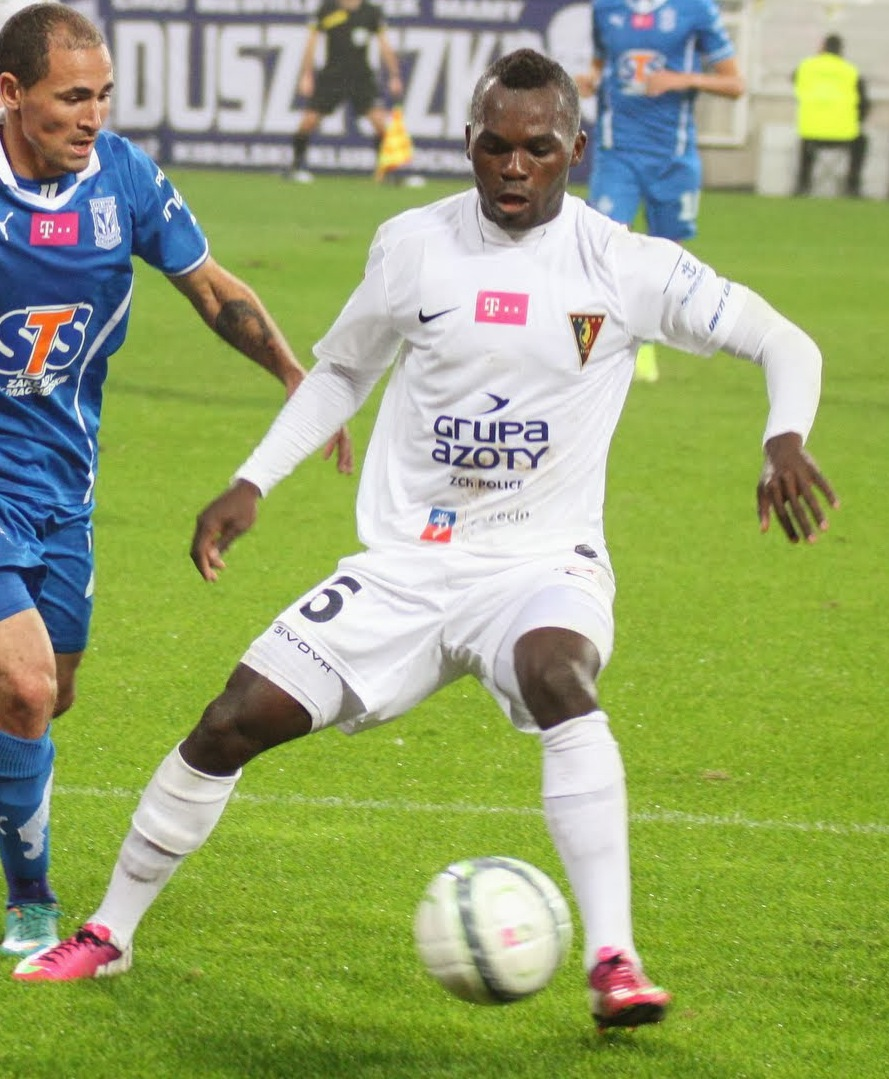
- Tchami with Pogoń Szczecin in 2013

Personal information
- Full name: Hervé Christian Tchami-Ngangoue
- Date of birth: 20 February 1988 (age 38)
- Place of birth: Fopounga, Cameroon
- Height: 1.75 m (5 ft 9 in)
- Position: Winger

Youth career
- 2005–2006: Hertha BSC
- 2006–2007: Hamburger SV

Senior career*
Years	Team	Apps	(Gls)
2006–2007	Hamburger SV II	6	(1)
2008	Zagłębie Sosnowiec	0	(0)
2008–2010	MFK Karviná	27	(0)
2010–2011	Szolnoki MÁV	20	(2)
2011–2013	Budapest Honvéd	38	(5)
2013	Pogoń Szczecin	10	(0)
2013	Pogoń Szczecin II	2	(0)
2014	IFK Värnamo	13	(3)
2014	USM Bel-Abbès	6	(0)
2015	Al-Oruba SC	0	(0)
2015–2016	Giresunspor	23	(3)
2016–2017	Feirense	1	(0)
2017	Hajer Club	7	(0)
2018	Keşla	15	(0)
2019–2020	Düzkaya KOSK	11	(3)

International career
2013	Cameroon	1	(0)
- * Club domestic league appearances and goals

Hervé Christian Tchami-Ngangoue (born 20 February 1988) is a Cameroonian former professional footballer who played as a winger.

== Club career ==
Tchami was born in Fopounga, Cameroon.

On 17 August 2016, Tchami signed for C.D. Feirense.

On 17 January 2018, Keşla FK announced the signing of Tchami on a one-year contract.

== International career ==
Tchami made one appearance for the Cameroon national team in 2013.

== Personal life ==
Tchami is from a family of footballers. His three older brothers also played professionally: Alphonse, a former Cameroon international, Bertrand, a former Grenoble and Reims player, and Joël.
