= Gábor Sztankó =

Hungarian footballer

Personal information
- Full name: Gábor Sztankó
- Date of birth: January 18, 1985 (age 41)
- Place of birth: Vác, Hungary
- Height: 1.88 m (6 ft 2 in)
- Position: Goalkeeper

Youth career
- 2002–2006: Dunakanyar-Vác FC

Senior career*
Years	Team	Apps	(Gls)
2006–2007	Kecskeméti TE	1	(0)
2007–2011	Dunakanyar-Vác FC	102	(0)
2011–2013	Egri FC	46	(0)
- * Club domestic league appearances and goals as of 26 May 2013

Gábor Sztankó (born 18 January 1985) is a retired Hungarian professional footballer who last played for Egri FC. He played as a goalkeeper for 2006 to 2013.

== Club honours ==
=== Egri FC ===
- Hungarian National Championship II:
  - Winner: 2011–12

== Career statistics ==
Season	Club	Country	Competition	Matches	Goals
2006–07	Kecskeméti TE	Hungary	NB2	1	0
2007–08	Dunakanyar-Vác FC	Hungary	NB2	28	0
2008–09	Dunakanyar-Vác FC	Hungary	NB2	20	0
2009–10	Dunakanyar-Vác FC	Hungary	NB2	25	0
2010–11	Dunakanyar-Vác FC	Hungary	NB2	29	0
2011–12	Egri FC	Hungary	NB2	29	0
2012–13	Egri FC	Hungary	NB1	17	0
			Total	149	0
