= István Kövesfalvi =

Hungarian footballer (born 1968)

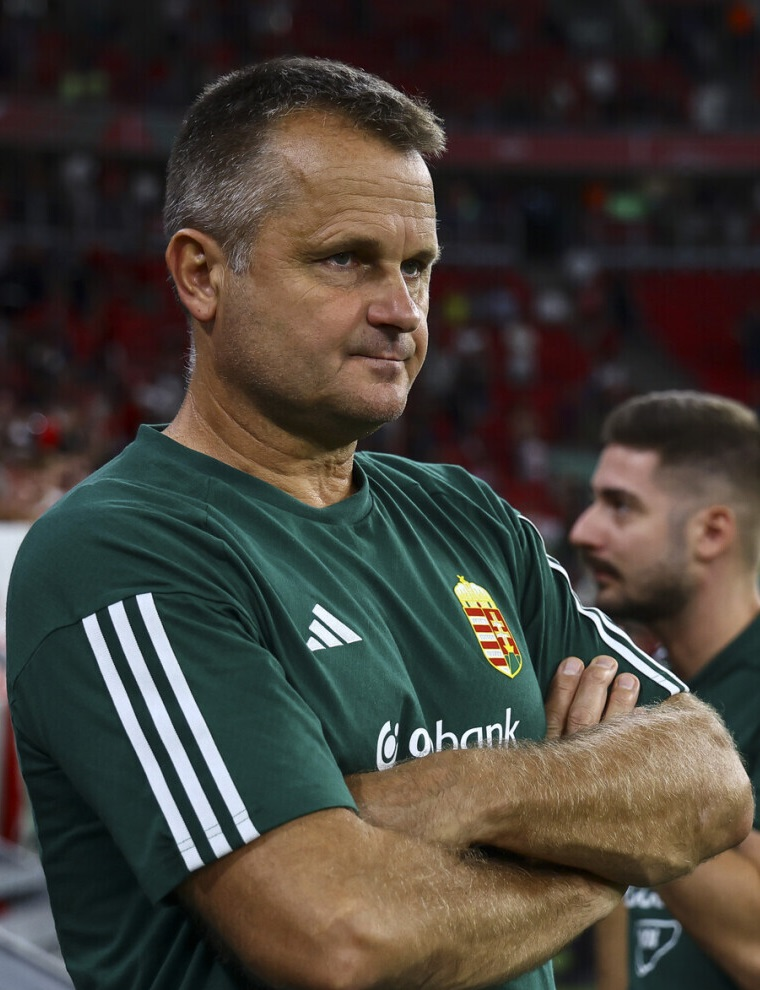
- Kövesfalvi with Hungary in 2024

Personal information
- Full name: István Kövesfalvi
- Date of birth: 5 December 1968 (age 57)
- Place of birth: Budapest, Hungary
- Height: 1.88 m (6 ft 2 in)
- Position: Goalkeeper

Senior career*
| Years | Team | Apps | (Gls) |
| 1996–1997 | Debreceni VSC | 22 | (0) |
| 1998–1999 | Gazszer FC | 66 | (0) |
| 2000–2002 | Vasas SC | 49 | (0) |
| 2002–2004 | REAC | 19 | (0) |
| 2004–2006 | Diósgyőri VTK | 37 | (0) |
| 2006–2007 | Ujpest FC | 1 | (0) |
| 2007 | FC Tatabánya | 0 | (0) |
| 2008 | Diósgyőri VTK | 2 | (0) |
| 2009–2010 | Szolnok | 3 | (0) |
| 2011–2012 | Dabas FC | 29 | (0) |
| 2012 | Egri FC | 0 | (0) |
| 2013– | Veresegyház VSK | 12 | (0) |

Managerial career
- 2011–2013: Egri FC (goalkeeper coach)
- * Club domestic league appearances and goals

István Kövesfalvi (born 5 December 1968 in Budapest) is a retired Hungarian football player who is currently the goalkeeping coach of Egri FC.
