= Norbert Németh (footballer) =

Hungarian footballer

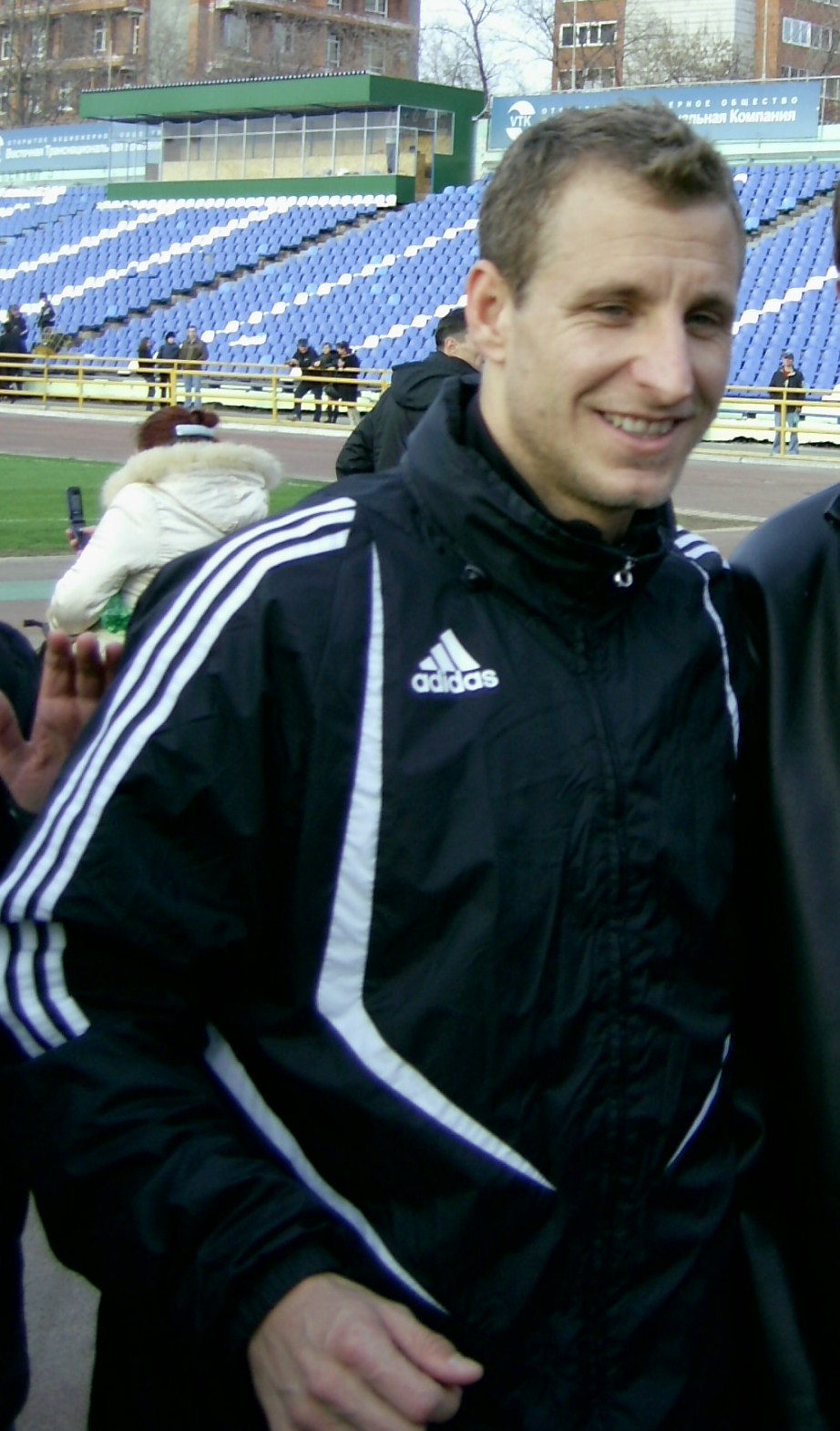

Personal information
- Date of birth: 5 May 1981 (age 45)
- Place of birth: Budapest, Hungary
- Height: 1.84 m (6 ft 0 in)
- Position: Midfielder

Senior career*
Years	Team	Apps	(Gls)
1999–2002	Budapest Honvéd	38	(5)
2001–2002	→ Marcali VFC (loan)	17	(4)
2002–2004	ETO	58	(5)
2004–2005	MTK	8	(1)
2005	Újpest	11	(1)
2005–2009	Vasas	79	(30)
2009–2010	Tom Tomsk	10	(0)
2010–2011	Vasas	14	(4)
2011–2012	Budapest Honvéd	16	(3)
2012–2013	Egri	28	(9)
2013–2014	Gabčíkovo		
2014	SC Melk		
2014–2017	Saalfelden	75	(13)
2019	Saalfelden	1	(0)

International career
2004	Hungary	2	(0)
- * Club domestic league appearances and goals

Norbert Németh (born 5 May 1981) is a Hungarian former football player.

== Career ==
On 4 March 2009 Tom Tomsk bought the Hungarian midfielder Nemeth, who had left Vasas in mid-February for a trial period with the Russian club.

== International ==
Németh also has two appearances with the National Hungarian team.
