= Bertrand Tchami =

Cameroonian footballer (born 1977)

Personal information
- Date of birth: 14 February 1977 (age 49)
- Place of birth: Douala, Cameroon
- Height: 1.80 m (5 ft 11 in)
- Position: Forward

Senior career*
Years	Team	Apps	(Gls)
1996–1998	OB		
1998–1999	Sportivo Luqueño		
1999	Visé		
2000	Eupen		
2000–2001	SO Romorantin		
2001–2002	Grenoble	24	(3)
2002–2003	Reims	29	(2)
2004–2005	Pau FC		
2005–2006	Rupel Boom		
2006–2007	Épernay		
- * Club domestic league appearances and goals

Bertrand Tchami (born 14 February 1977) is a Cameroonian former professional footballer who played as a forward.

== Personal life ==
Tchami is from a family of footballers. His three brothers also played professionally: his older brother Alphonse, a former Cameroon international, and his younger brothers Joël and Hervé.
