= Csaba Preklet =

Hungarian footballer

Personal information
- Date of birth: 25 January 1991 (age 35)
- Place of birth: Kapuvár, Hungary
- Height: 1.82 m (5 ft 11 1/2 in)
- Position: Defender

Team information
- Current team: FC Bihor
- Number: 5

Youth career
- 2003–2007: Győr

Senior career*
Years	Team	Apps	(Gls)
2007–2012	Reggina Primavera	9	(0)
2011	→ Kecskemét (loan)	3	(0)
2011–2012	→ Eger (loan)	24	(4)
2012–2013	Eger	17	(0)
2013–2014	Zalaegerszeg	13	(0)
2014–2017	Vasas	23	(0)
2017	→ Cegléd (loan)	18	(0)
2017–2019	Cegléd	68	(2)
2019–2020	Tiszakécske	23	(2)
2020–2022	Pécs	57	(5)
2022–2023	III. Kerületi	18	(1)
2023	Dorog	17	(1)
2023	MSE Târgu Mureș	13	(1)
2024–	FC Bihor	10	(0)

International career
2008–2009	Hungary U-17	3	(0)
2009–2010	Hungary U-19	10	(0)
2010	Hungary U-21	1	(0)
- * Club domestic league appearances and goals as of 30 May 2023

Csaba Preklet (born 25 January 1991) is a Hungarian football player who plays for FC Bihor Oradea.

== Career ==
On 20 January 2023, Preklet signed with Dorog.

== Honours ==
FC Bihor Oradea

- Liga III (1): 2023–24
