= Szentmarjay Tibor Városi Stadion =

Szentmarjay Tibor Stadion
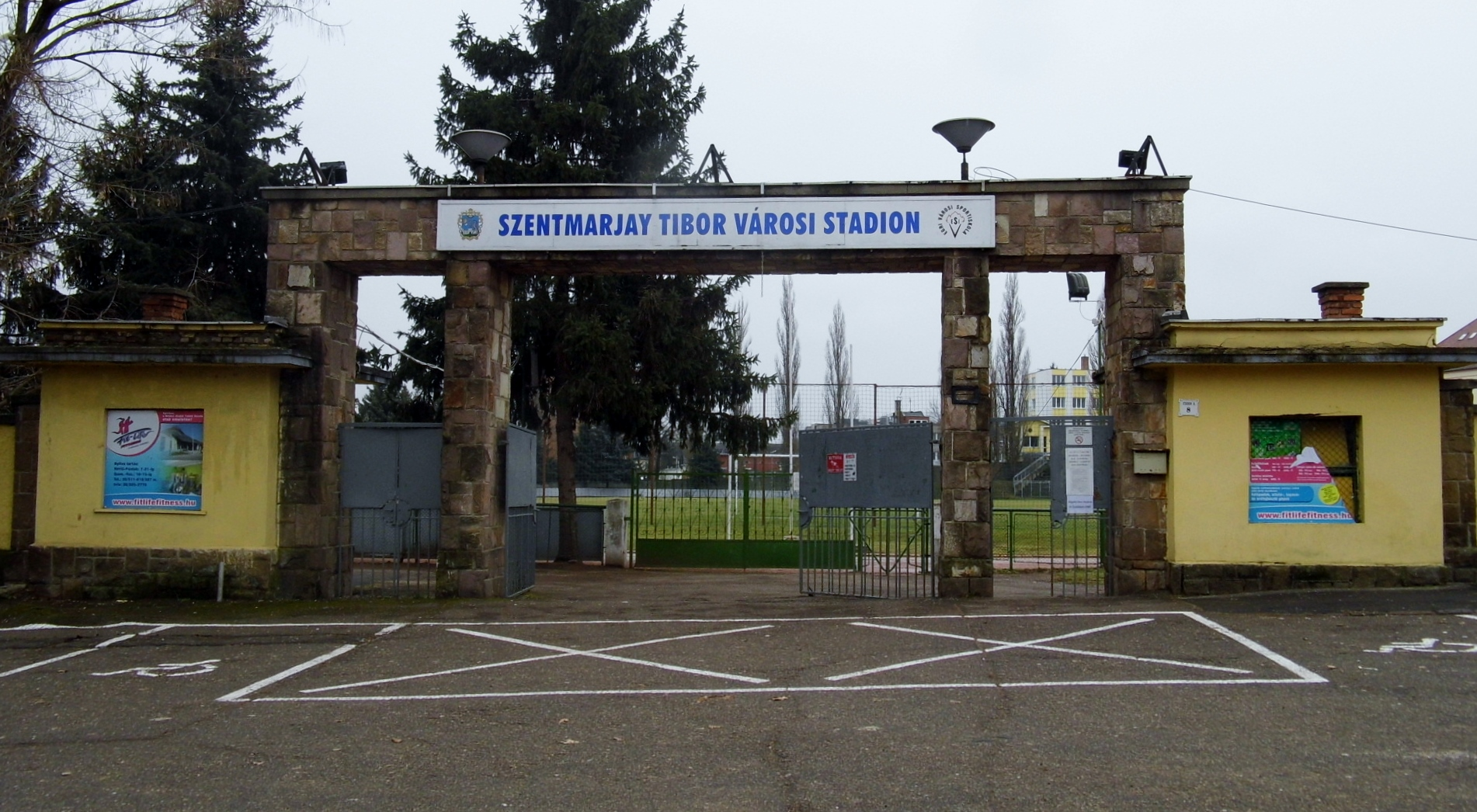
- Interactive map of Szentmarjay Tibor Stadion
- Former names: Egri Városi Stadion
- Location: Stadion utca 8. Eger, Hungary
- Coordinates: 47.8945°N 20.3785°E
- Owner: Eger MJV Önkormányzata
- Capacity: 6,000
- Field size: 105 by 65 metres (344 ft × 213 ft)

Construction
- Opened: August 1954

Tenant
- Egri FC

Szentmarjay Tibor Városi Stadion is a sports stadium in Eger, Hungary. The stadium is a home to the famous association football side Egri FC. The stadium has a capacity of 6,000.

== Attendance ==
=== Records ===
Record Attendance:

- 18,000 Egri Dózsa v Ferencváros, May 14, 1967
