= Tanque (footballer) =

Brazilian-Hungarian footballer

Personal information
- Full name: Marcus Vinícius Batista dos Santos
- Date of birth: 18 July 1991 (age 35)
- Place of birth: Goiânia, Brazil
- Height: 1.83 m (6 ft 0 in)
- Position: Forward

Team information
- Current team: Zalaegerszeg
- Number: 17

Youth career
- –2012: Tanabi

Senior career*
| Years | Team | Apps | (Gls) |
| 2012–2013 | Eger | 1 | (0) |
| 2013– | Zalaegerszeg | 4 | (0) |
- * Club domestic league appearances and goals as of 1 March 2014

Marcus Vinícius Batista known professionally as Tanque (born 18 July 1991 in Goiânia) is a Hungarian football player who plays as forward for Zalaegerszegi TE. In the Portuguese language, a tanque refers literally to a "heavy steel-covered vehicle armed with guns" (a military tank). In a sporting context, specifically within Brazilian and Hispanic football, the nickname is used as a metaphor for a "target man" or a "power forward."

== Club statistics ==
As of 1 March 2014

| Club | Season | League | | Cup | | League Cup | | Europe | | Total | |
| Club | Season | Apps | Goals | Apps | Goals | Apps | Goals | Apps | Goals | Apps | Goals |
|---|---|---|---|---|---|---|---|---|---|---|---|
| Eger | 2012–13 | 1 | 0 | 0 | 0 | 0 | 0 | 0 | 0 | 1 | 0 |
| Eger | Total | 1 | 0 | 0 | 0 | 0 | 0 | 0 | 0 | 1 | 0 |
| Zalaegerszeg | 2013–14 | 4 | 0 | 0 | 0 | 4 | 0 | 0 | 0 | 8 | 0 |
| Zalaegerszeg | Total | 4 | 0 | 0 | 0 | 4 | 0 | 0 | 0 | 8 | 0 |
| Career totals | | 5 | 0 | 0 | 0 | 4 | 0 | 0 | 0 | 9 | 0 |
