= Gábor Koós =

Hungarian footballer

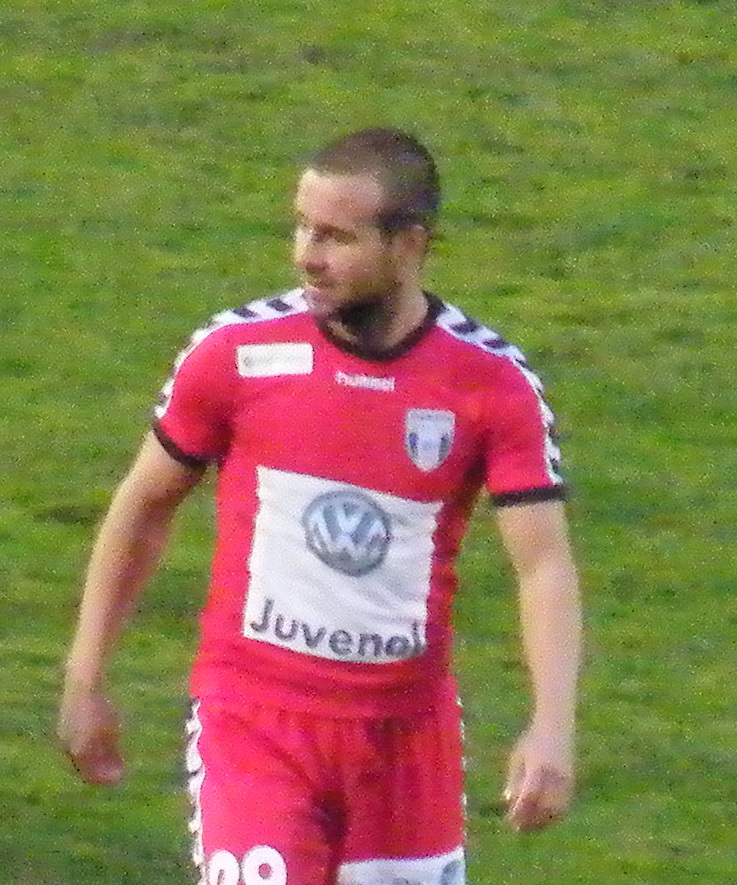

Personal information
- Full name: Gábor Koós
- Date of birth: 9 February 1986 (age 40)
- Place of birth: Budapest, Hungary
- Height: 1.73 m (5 ft 8 in)
- Position: Striker

Youth career
- 2002–2006: Budapest Honvéd

Senior career*
Years	Team	Apps	(Gls)
2006–2009	Budapest Honvéd	32	(5)
2008–2009	→ Siófok (loan)	18	(0)
2009–2010	Rákospalota	13	(3)
2010	Budaörs	12	(6)
2010–2011	Szolnok	11	(0)
2011	Budaörs	15	(6)
2011–2013	Eger	37	(3)
2013–2015	Cegléd	58	(13)
2015–2016	Soroksár	5	(1)
2016–2022	Érd	152	(53)
- * Club domestic league appearances and goals as of 29 May 2022

Gábor Koós (born 9 February 1986 in Budapest) is a retired Hungarian football (forward) player.
