= Jiří Kabele =

Czech footballer

Personal information
- Full name: Jiří Kabele
- Date of birth: 17 February 1987 (age 39)
- Place of birth: Prague, Czechoslovakia
- Height: 1.80 m (5 ft 11 in)
- Position: Right midfielder

Youth career
- –2007: Kladno

Senior career*
Years	Team	Apps	(Gls)
2007–2011	Kladno	30	(5)
2008–2009	→ Vlašim (loan)		
2009–2010	→ Varnsdorf (loan)		
2011–2012	DAC Dunajská Streda	22	(1)
2012–2013	Egri	18	(0)
2014–2015	Sparta Kolín	8	(0)
2015–2016	Slavoj Vyšehrad	3	(0)
- * Club domestic league appearances and goals

Jiří Kabele (born 17 February 1987) is a Czech former football midfielder, who played three matches in the Czech First League for Kladno. He played in the top football leagues of Slovakia and Hungary, with DAC Dunajská Streda and Egri respectively, before playing in the Czech second tier for Sparta Kolín and Slavoj Vyšehrad.
