= Igor Pisanjuk =

Association fotball player (born 1989)

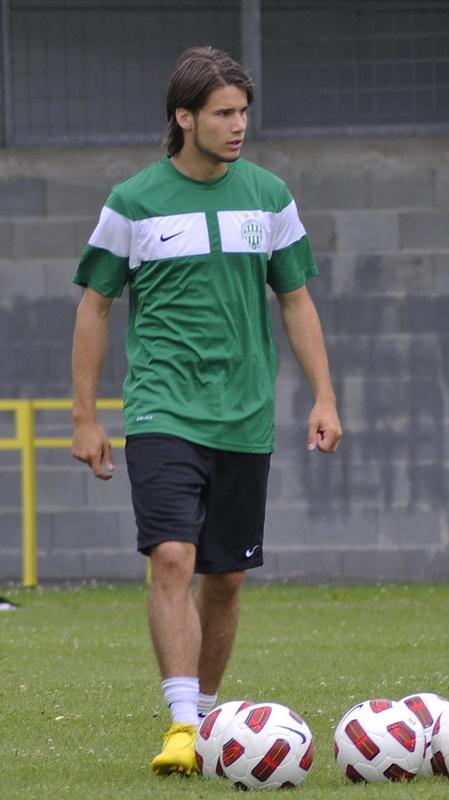
- Pisanjuk in 2010

Personal information
- Date of birth: 24 October 1989 (age 37)
- Place of birth: Sremska Mitrovica, SR Serbia, SFR Yugoslavia
- Height: 1.79 m (5 ft 10 in)
- Position: Forward

Youth career
- –2007: Erin Mills SC
- 2012: ProStars FC

Senior career*
Years	Team	Apps	(Gls)
2008–2011	Ferencvárosi TC	7	(0)
2010–2011	→ Szolnoki MÁV FC (loan)	24	(9)
2011	Mississauga Eagles FC	0	(0)
2011–2012	Kecskeméti TE	0	(0)
2012	Egri FC	20	(3)
2013	Vasas SC	6	(0)
2013–2014	Astros Vasas FC	2	(0)

International career
2008–2009	Canada U20	5	(2)
2009–2010	Canada U23	1	(0)

Managerial career
- 2014: Astros Vasas FC (player-coach)
- * Club domestic league appearances and goals

Igor Pisanjuk (Ukrainian: Ігор Писанюк; Serbian Cyrillic: Игор Писањук; born 24 October 1989) is a former professional footballer who played in the Nemzeti Bajnokság I, Nemzeti Bajnokság II, and the Canadian Soccer League. Born in Serbia, he represented Canada at youth international level.

== Club career ==
Born in Sremska Mitrovica, SR Serbia, SFR Yugoslavia, Pisanjuk began his career with Erin Mills SC and in 2007 was the OSL Provincial West U21 leading goal scorer at the age of 17.

He joined Ferencváros in December 2007, signing his first professional contract. He scored his first two goals on 6 November 2008 against Kecskeméti TE and on 12 November 2008 against REAC. In the 2008–09 season, Ferencvaros were the champions of the Nemzeti Bajnokság II and were promoted to the Nemzeti Bajnokság I.

Pisanjuk was then loaned out to a Nemzeti Bajnokság II team Szolnoki MÁV in February 2010. He had 13 appearances with 12 starts and 9 goals. That season Szolnok MAV were the champions of the Nemzeti Bajnokság II and were promoted to the Nemzeti Bajnokság I. On 24 April 2011, he signed with Mississauga Eagles FC of the Canadian Soccer League. Midway through the season he was transferred to Kecskemeti TE.

On 13 February 2012, he signed to Egri FC in the Nemzeti Bajnokság II. He scored his first goal on 5 May 2012 against Ceglédi VSE. That season Egri FC won the Nemzeti Bajnokság II and were promoted to the Nemzeti Bajnokság I. Pisanjuk had 9 appearances and 2 goals that season.

In 2012, he was in the ProStars FC academy in Canada, before being invited to a tryout in Romania.

In January 2013 Pisanjuk signed for Vasas SC and scored six goals for them, before in May 2013 he returned to Canada. He signed a contract on 25 May 2013 with Canadian Soccer League side Astros Vasas FC. Midway through the 2014 season he was appointed player/head coach, and led the Astros to the postseason by finishing fourth in the overall standings.

== International career ==
On 12 November 2008, Pisanjuk was called to a Canada U-20 training camp in Switzerland, where he scored his first two goals for the under 20 national team on 24 November 2008 against Young Boys Bern II. On 23 February 2009, Pisanjuk was named to the Canada U-20 team competing in the CONCACAF World Cup Qualifying tournament in Trinidad and Tobago. He played on the Canadian Under 23 Olympic team.

== Personal life ==
Pisanjuk grew up in Mississauga, Ontario and from 2003 to 2007 attended Philip Pocock Catholic High School.

== Honours ==
- 2007: OSL Provincial West U21 Leading Goal Scorers
- 2008–09 NB2 Champion with Ferencvárosi TC
- 2009–10 NB2 Champion with Szolnoki MÁV
- 2011–12 NB2 Champion with Egri FC
