= Dušan Pavlov =

Serbian footballer

Personal information
- Full name: Dušan Pavlov
- Date of birth: 19 July 1989 (age 37)
- Place of birth: Kikinda, SFR Yugoslavia
- Height: 1.79 m (5 ft 10 in)
- Position: Striker

Senior career*
Years	Team	Apps	(Gls)
2007–2010	OFK Kikinda		
2010–2011	Bačka Topola		
2011–2013	Eger	29	(8)
2013	Putnok	12	(6)
2013–2014	Kisvárda	27	(5)
2014–	ŽAK Kikinda		
- * Club domestic league appearances and goals as of 1 June 2014

Dušan Pavlov (Serbian Cyrillic: Душан Павлов, born 19 July 1989) is a Serbian football player who most recently played for ŽAK Kikinda.

Born in Kikinda (SFR Yugoslavia), he started playing in a local club FK Kikinda In 2011 he signed to Egri FC. He made his Nemzeti Bajnokság II debut on 15 October 2011 against Kazincbarcikai SC

== Career ==
He made his Nemzeti Bajnokság I debut on 3 August 2012 in a 1–1 drawn to BFC Siófok
