= Michael Stanislaw =

Austrian footballer (born 1987)

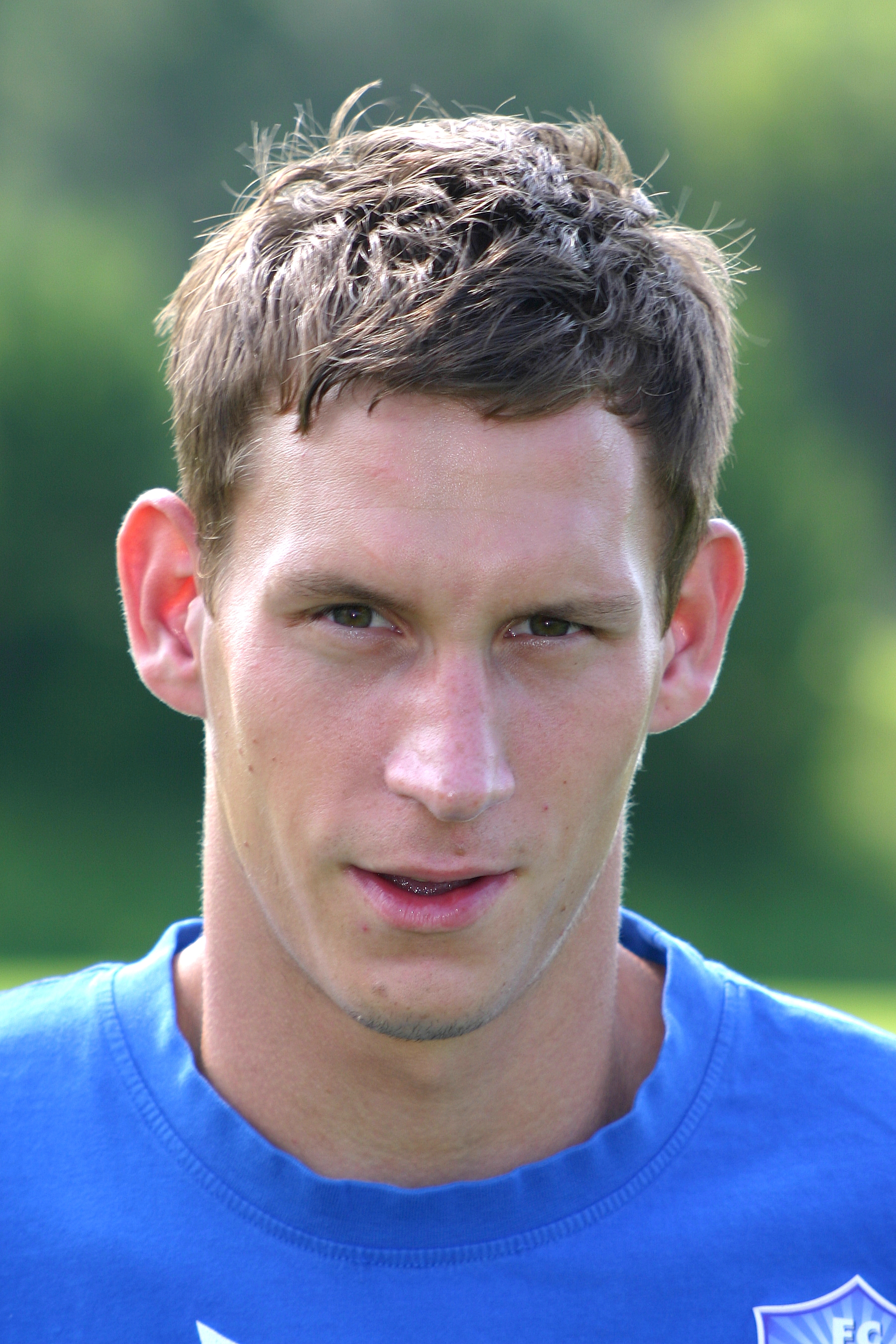

Personal information
- Full name: Michael Stanislaw
- Date of birth: 5 June 1987 (age 39)
- Place of birth: Leoben, Austria
- Height: 1.78 m (5 ft 10 in)
- Position: Midfielder

Team information
- Current team: Egri FC
- Number: 6

Youth career
- 2000–2004: Admira Wacker Mödling

Senior career*
Years	Team	Apps	(Gls)
2004–2005	SC Austria Lustenau	6	(0)
2006–2008	SC Schwanenstadt	47	(1)
2008–2012	SC Wiener Neustadt	92	(0)
2012–	Egri FC	13	(0)
2013–2014	SV Horn	33	(0)
2014–	SC Ritzing	10	(0)

International career^{‡}
2006–2007	Austria U-20	8	(0)
2005–2008	Austria U-21	9	(0)
- * Club domestic league appearances and goals as of 2 December 2012 ‡ National team caps and goals as of 9 September 2008

Michael Stanislaw (born 5 June 1987) is an Austrian footballer who plays as a midfielder for Egri FC.
