= Joël Tchami =

Cameroonian footballer

Personal information
- Full name: Joël Armel Tchami Ngalaha
- Date of birth: 25 March 1982 (age 44)
- Place of birth: Bafang, Cameroon
- Height: 1.77 m (5 ft 10 in)
- Position: Striker

Youth career
- –1998: Unisport de Bafang
- 1998–2001: Hertha BSC

Senior career*
Years	Team	Apps	(Gls)
2001–2004	Hertha BSC	1	(0)
2001–2004	Hertha BSC II		
2004–2005	Laval	10	(2)
2005–2006	Hapoel Kfar Saba		
2006–2007	AC Horsens	8	(1)
2007–2008	Pegah		
2008–2010	Al Ansar		
2010	UTA Arad		
2010–2011	Al Salmiya		
2011–2012	Hà Nội ACB	10	(1)
2012	Dunajská Streda	6	(0)
2012–2013	Egri FC	1	
2013	Charlevilla		
2013–2014	Putrajaya SPA FC		
- * Club domestic league appearances and goals

Joël Armel Tchami Ngalaha (born 25 March 1982) is a Cameroonian former professional footballer who played as a striker.

== Career ==
Tchami was born in Bafang. He previously played for Stade Lavallois in France's Ligue 2. (Note: Joël Tchami – French league stats at LFP – also available in French (archived))

In January he joined Danish Superliga club AC Horsens from Israeli side Hapoel Kfar Saba after trialling with the club. He signed a one-and-a-half-year contract.

== Personal life ==
Tchami is from a family of footballers. One of his older brothers is Alphonse Tchami, former Cameroon international, another is Bertrand, a former Grenoble Foot 38 and Stade de Reims player, and Joël's younger brother, Hervé Tchami, is also a footballer.
