= Ismaël Koné (footballer, born 1988) =

French footballer

Personal information
- Full name: Ismaël Fanton Koné
- Date of birth: 12 July 1988 (age 38)
- Place of birth: Paris, France
- Height: 1.88 m (6 ft 2 in)
- Position: Defender

Youth career
- RC Strasbourg

Senior career*
Years	Team	Apps	(Gls)
2010–2011	Agrotikos Asteras F.C.	10	(0)
2011–2012	Panserraikos F.C.	2	(0)
2012–2013	Iraklis Psachna F.C.	12	(0)
2013	Egri FC	10	(0)
2014–2015	UR Namur	28	(1)
2015	RC Arbaâ	0	(0)
- * Club domestic league appearances and goals as of 26 May 2015

Ismaël Fanton Koné (born 12 July 1988) is a French former footballer who played as a defender.

== Playing career ==
Koné developed in the youth system of French club RC Strasbourg.

He began his senior career in Greece, playing with Agrotikos Asteras F.C., Panserraikos F.C., and Iraklis Psachna F.C. Afterwards, he played for Hungarian club Egri FC, where he made 10 league appearances and one league cup appearance where he was substituted due to injury. In June 2013, he went on trial with Polish club Widzew Łódź. Afterwards, he played for Belgian club UR Namur.
