= Savo Raković =

Serbian footballer

Personal information
- Full name: Savo Raković
- Date of birth: 1 October 1985 (age 41)
- Place of birth: Požega, SFR Yugoslavia
- Height: 1.83 m (6 ft 0 in)
- Position: Centre-back

Senior career*
Years	Team	Apps	(Gls)
2003	Sloga Požega		
2004–2010	Sevojno	166	(4)
2010–2012	Diósgyőr	36	(0)
2013	Eger	5	(0)
2014	Sloboda Užice	20	(0)
2015–2016	Nyíregyháza	19	(0)
2018–2020	Jedinstvo Putevi		
- * Club domestic league appearances and goals as of 10 November 2016

Savo Raković (Serbian Cyrillic: Саво Раковић; born 1 October 1985) is a Serbian retired footballer who played as a defender.

== Career ==
Raković started out at his hometown club Sloga Požega, before switching to Sevojno in the 2004 winter transfer window. He spent the following six and a half seasons there, before moving abroad to Hungary in 2010. After two and a half years at Diósgyőri VTK, Raković moved to Egri FC in early 2013.

== Honours ==
Sevojno

- Serbian Cup: Runner-up 2008–09
