= Dávid Zvara =

Hungarian footballer

Personal information
- Date of birth: 22 July 1994 (age 32)
- Place of birth: Eger, Hungary
- Height: 1.75 m (5 ft 9 in)
- Position: Midfielder

Team information
- Current team: Kaposvár

Youth career
- 2004–2010: Eger

Senior career*
Years	Team	Apps	(Gls)
2010–2013	Eger	9	(1)
2013–2016	Szolnok	50	(1)
2016–2017	STC Salgótarján	16	(0)
2017–2019	Dunaújváros	45	(0)
2019–2020	Szeged-Csanád	32	(0)
2020–2021	Tiszakécske	21	(0)
2021–	Kaposvár	15	(1)
- * Club domestic league appearances and goals as of 8 May 2022

Dávid Zvara (born 22 July 1994) is a Hungarian football player who plays for Kaposvár.

== Club statistics ==
As of 9 March 2014

Appearances and goals by club, season and competition
Club	Season	League			Cup		League Cup		Europe		Total	
Club	Season	Division	Apps	Goals	Apps	Goals	Apps	Goals	Apps	Goals	Apps	Goals
Eger	2010–11	Nemzeti Bajnokság III	1	0	0	0	0	0	0	0	1	0
Eger	2011–12	Nemzeti Bajnokság II	1	0	1	0	0	0	0	0	2	0
Eger	2012–13	Nemzeti Bajnokság I	7	1	0	0	3	0	0	0	10	1
Eger	Total		9	1	1	0	3	0	0	0	13	1
Szolnok	2013–14	Nemzeti Bajnokság II	13	0	1	0	4	0	0	0	18	0
Szolnok	Total		13	0	1	0	4	0	0	0	18	0
Career total			22	1	2	0	7	0	0	0	31	1
