= Mario Pufek =

Croatian professional football player (born 1985)

Personal information
- Full name: Mario Pufek
- Date of birth: 6 May 1985 (age 41)
- Place of birth: Subotica, SR Serbia, SFR Yugoslavia
- Height: 1.85 m (6 ft 1 in)
- Position: Defender

Youth career
- –2004: Spartak Subotica

Senior career*
Years	Team	Apps	(Gls)
2004–2005	Belišće	17	(0)
2005–2006	Kaposvölgye	22	(4)
2006–2008	Istra 1961	46	(5)
2008–2010	Nordvärmland	33	(4)
2010–2012	Primorac Stobreč	25	(2)
2012–2014	Békéscsaba	17	(0)
2014–2015	Bačka 1901	15	(0)
2015–2019	IFK Ås/Åmotfors IF	52	(4)

International career
2004–2005	Croatia U-20	2	(0)
- * Club domestic league appearances and goals as of 2 December 2022

Mario Pufek (born 6 May 1985) is a Croatian retired football (defender) player who last played for Swedish amateur side IFK Ås/Åmotfors IF.

== Career ==
Despite being born in Subotica, SR Serbia, he is part of the Croatian minority in Vojvodina, and he represented Croatian U-20 team internationally 2004–2005. Made his debut as a professional football player at age 17.
