= Josef Hamouz =

Czech footballer (born 1980)

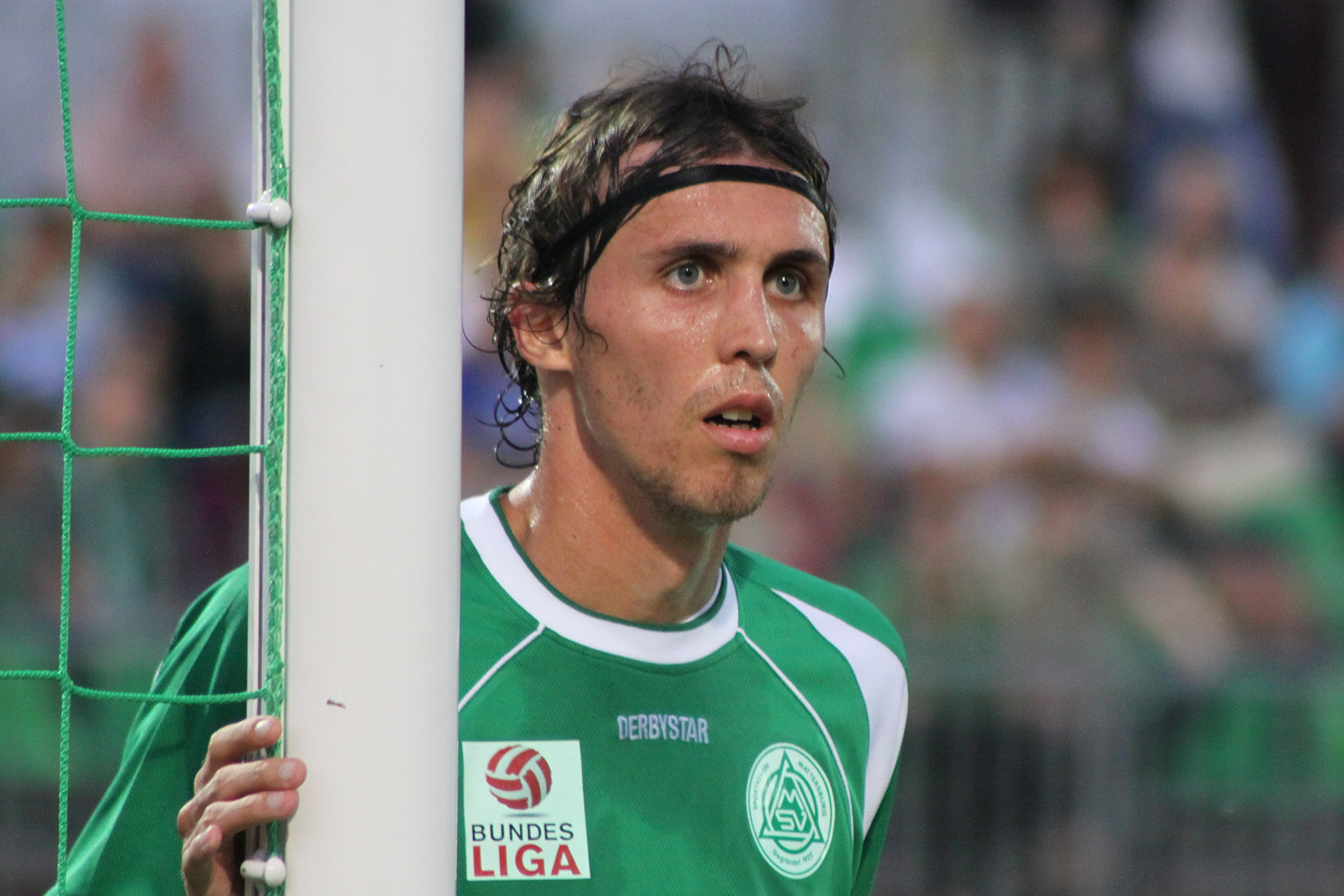

Personal information
- Full name: Josef Hamouz
- Date of birth: 8 April 1980 (age 46)
- Place of birth: Ostrov nad Ohří, Czechoslovakia
- Height: 1.85 m (6 ft 1 in)
- Position: Defender

Team information
- Current team: Egri FC
- Number: 9

Senior career*
Years	Team	Apps	(Gls)
1999–2000	SK Spolana Neratovice	35	(2)
2000	→ SK Sparta Krč (loan)	?	(?)
2001–2003	FK Baník Most	46	(5)
2003–2007	FC Slovan Liberec	54	(4)
2007	→ SK Kladno (loan)	13	(1)
2007–2009	FK Baumit Jablonec	58	(3)
2009–2010	SV Mattersburg	18	(0)
2010–2011	FC Zbrojovka Brno	17	(0)
2011–	Egri FC	32	(1)
- * Club domestic league appearances and goals as of 4 November 2012

Josef Hamouz (born 8 April 1980) is a Czech professional football player. He plays as a defender.

== Career ==
After several seasons playing professional football in his homeland, Hamouz signed a two-year contract with Austrian Football Bundesliga side SV Mattersburg in June 2009.
