= Vladimir Buač =

Serbian footballer

Personal information
- Date of birth: 26 December 1984 (age 41)
- Place of birth: Knin, SR Croatia, SFR Yugoslavia
- Height: 1.79 m (5 ft 10 in)
- Position: Forward

Youth career
- Dinara
- Kabel
- Vojvodina

Senior career*
Years	Team	Apps	(Gls)
2003–2009	Vojvodina	99	(13)
2003–2004	→ Kabel (loan)	28	(2)
2004–2005	→ Cement Beočin (loan)	9	(1)
2009–2011	Nîmes	16	(0)
2011	BSK Borča	10	(2)
2012	Atyrau	19	(1)
2013	Egri FC	10	(0)
2013	Partizani Tirana	12	(0)
Total		202	(19)

Managerial career
- 2016–2017: Vojvodina (assistant)
- 2017: Vojvodina (caretaker)
- 2017: Vojvodina
- 2018: ČSK Čelarevo
- 2019–2020: Spartak Subotica (qssistant)
- 2020–2021: Spartak Subotica
- * Club domestic league appearances and goals

Vladimir Buač (Serbian Cyrillic: Владимир Буач; born 26 December 1984) is a Croatian Serb football coach and former player. He played as a forward.

== Career ==
Buač played for Vojvodina, making over 100 official appearances for the side. He subsequently moved abroad to France and signed with Ligue 2 side Nîmes in 2009. In the following years, Buač also played in the top flights of Kazakhstan, Hungary, and Albania.

After retiring from the game, Buač served as both assistant and caretaker manager at his former club Vojvodina. He again took charge of Vojvodina in September 2017.

== Honours ==
Vojvodina

- Serbian Cup runner-up: 2006–07
