= Ádám Albert =

Hungarian footballer

Personal information
- Date of birth: 16 October 1990 (age 36)
- Place of birth: Budapest, Hungary
- Height: 1.80 m (5 ft 11 in)
- Position: Midfielder

Team information
- Current team: Dorog
- Number: 9

Youth career
- 2003: Veresegyháza
- 2003–2004: Újlengyel
- 2004–2005: Hernád
- 2005–2009: Vác

Senior career*
| Years | Team | Apps | (Gls) |
| 2009–2012 | Vác | 77 | (9) |
| 2012–2013 | Eger | 20 | (1) |
| 2013–2015 | Kaposvár | 27 | (0) |
| 2015–2016 | Somos | 28 | (8) |
| 2016–2017 | Ceglédi | 37 | (8) |
| 2017–2019 | Soroksár | 52 | (4) |
| 2019 | Jászberényi | 13 | (8) |
| 2019–2020 | Dorog | 14 | (2) |
| 2020 | Szolnok | 6 | (0) |
| 2020–2021 | Jászberényi | 16 | (5) |
| 2021 | Tiszakécske | 21 | (1) |
| 2022 | Dabas-Gyón | 18 | (5) |
| 2022– | Dorog | 28 | (0) |
- * Club domestic league appearances and goals as of 30 May 2023

Ádám Albert (born 16 October 1990) is a professional Hungarian footballer who plays for Dorog.

== Career ==
In February 2019, Albert joined Jászberényi FC.

On 8 July 2022, Albert returned to Dorog.

== Career statistics ==
Appearances and goals by club, season and competition
| Club | Season | League | | | Cup | | League Cup | | Europe | | Total | |
| Club | Season | Division | Apps | Goals | Apps | Goals | Apps | Goals | Apps | Goals | Apps | Goals |
|---|---|---|---|---|---|---|---|---|---|---|---|---|
Vác
| Vác | 2008–09 | Nemzeti Bajnokság II | 3 | 0 | 0 | 0 | 1 | 0 | 0 | 0 | 4 | 0 |
| Vác | 2009–10 | Nemzeti Bajnokság II | 15 | 1 | 3 | 0 | 0 | 0 | 0 | 0 | 18 | 1 |
| Vác | 2010–11 | Nemzeti Bajnokság II | 30 | 4 | 1 | 0 | 0 | 0 | 0 | 0 | 31 | 4 |
| Vác | 2011–12 | Nemzeti Bajnokság II | 29 | 4 | 2 | 0 | 0 | 0 | 0 | 0 | 31 | 4 |
| Vác | Total | | 77 | 9 | 6 | 0 | 1 | 0 | 0 | 0 | 84 | 9 |
| Eger | 2012–13 | Nemzeti Bajnokság I | 20 | 1 | 1 | 0 | 10 | 1 | 0 | 0 | 31 | 2 |
| Kaposvár | 2013–14 | Nemzeti Bajnokság I | 3 | 0 | 2 | 0 | 6 | 0 | 0 | 0 | 11 | 0 |
| Career total | | | 100 | 10 | 9 | 0 | 17 | 1 | 0 | 0 | 126 | 11 |

Updated to games played as of 4 March 2014.
