= Petr Knakal =

Czech footballer (born 1983)

Personal information
- Full name: Petr Knakal
- Date of birth: 1 February 1983 (age 43)
- Place of birth: Plzeň, Czechoslovakia
- Height: 1.91 m (6 ft 3 in)
- Position: Defender

Team information
- Current team: Egri FC
- Number: 3

Youth career
- 1997–2002: FC Viktoria Plzeň

Senior career*
Years	Team	Apps	(Gls)
2002–2008	FC Viktoria Plzeň	39	(2)
2008–2011	FK Baník Sokolov	55	(6)
2011	FK MAS Táborsko	9	(1)
2011–	Egri FC	37	(1)

International career
2003	Czech Republic U-20	7	(0)
- * Club domestic league appearances and goals as of 11 November 2012

Petr Knakal (born 1 February 1983 in Plzeň) is a Czech former football (defender) who played in the Czech First League.

== Career ==
Knakal began playing professional football as a central defender with FC Viktoria Plzeň. He made his Czech First League debut during the 2002–03 season, scoring two league goals for Viktoria. The same year, Knakal played for the Czech Republic at the FIFA Under-20 World Cup finals.
