= Dávid Palásthy =

Hungarian footballer (born 1990)

Personal information
- Full name: Dávid Palásthy
- Date of birth: 10 May 1990 (age 36)
- Place of birth: Vác, Hungary
- Height: 1.88 m (6 ft 2 in)
- Position: Goalkeeper

Team information
- Current team: Dunaharaszti
- Number: 21

Youth career
- 2003–2008: Vác
- 2008: Cegléd

Senior career*
Years	Team	Apps	(Gls)
2009–2013	Vác	11	(0)
2011	→ Zalaegerszeg (loan)	0	(0)
2013	Eger	1	(0)
2013–2016	Vác	72	(0)
2016–2017	Soroksár	0	(0)
2017–2018	III. Kerület	30	(0)
2018–2020	BKV Előre	39	(0)
2020–2021	Taksony SE	15	(0)
2021–	Dunaharaszti	22	(0)
- * Club domestic league appearances and goals as of 21:17, 4 February 2022 (UTC)

Dávid Palásthy (born 10 May 1990) is a professional Hungarian footballer who currently plays for Dunaharaszti MTK.

== Career statistics ==
Appearances and goals by club, season and competition
Club	Season	League			Cup		League Cup		Europe		Total	
Club	Season	Division	Apps	Goals	Apps	Goals	Apps	Goals	Apps	Goals	Apps	Goals
Vác
Vác	2010–11	Nemzeti Bajnokság II	1	0	2	0	0	0	0	0	3	0
Vác	2011–12	Nemzeti Bajnokság II	7	0	1	0	0	0	0	0	8	0
Vác	2012–13	Nemzeti Bajnokság II	3	0	1	0	0	0	0	0	4	0
Vác	Total		11	0	4	0	0	0	0	0	15	0
Zalaegerszeg	2011–12	Nemzeti Bajnokság I	0	0	0	0	5	0	0	0	5	0
Eger	2012–13	Nemzeti Bajnokság I	1	0	0	0	0	0	0	0	1	0
Career total			12	0	4	0	5	0	0	0	21	0

Updated to games played as of 2 June 2013.
