= Egri FC =

Hungarian football club

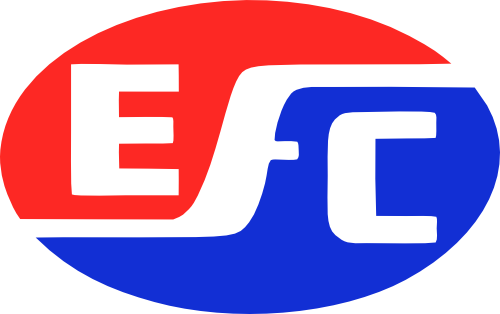
- Full name: Egri Futball Club
- Founded: 2005
- Dissolved: 2014
- Ground: Szentmarjay Tibor Városi Stadion, Eger
- Capacity: 6,000
- League: NB III
- 2013–14: NB III, East, 5th
- Website: www.egrifc.hu
Home colours	Away colours

Egri FC is a defunct professional football club, based in Eger, Heves County, Hungary.

== History ==
After the dissolution of FC Eger in 2003, Egri Football Club was founded in 2005. The club entered the Megyei Bajnokság II in 2005. In the following year, the club won the first season in the Megyei Bajnokság II and gained promotion to Megyei Bajnokság I. In 2007, the club celebrated another victory by winning the Megyei Bajnokság I.

Egri FC entered the 2007–08 Nemzeti Bajnokság III and finished in the sixth position. In 2011, Egri FC won the third division and were promoted to the second division. In the following year, Egri FC won the second division by finishing in the first place of the 2011–12 Nemzeti Bajnokság III and gained promotion to the first division.

In 2012, some matches were played in the Illovszky Rudolf Stadion since the quality of the turf of the club's own stadium did not meet the criteria of the first division.

Egri FC finished in the last position in the 2012–13 Nemzeti Bajnokság I season and were relegated to the second division.

In the 2012–13 Nemzeti Bajnokság I season, the club was involved in a match fixing scandal.

For the third division, all the players were exchanged. In 2014, the Hungarian Football Federation terminated the license of Egri FC and excluded the club from the 2013–14 Nemzeti Bajnokság III.

In 2014, the club dissolved due to insolvency.

== Ownership ==
In 2013, 75% of the shares of the club were bought by John P. Marshall.

In 2022, the former managing director of the Egri Futball Club Ltd. was found guilty in 5 convicts including embezzlement.

== Honours ==
- Nemzeti Bajnokság II:
  - Winners (1): 2011–12
- Nemzeti Bajnokság III:
  - Winners (1): 2010–11
- Megyei Bajnokság I:
  - Winners (1): 2006–07

== Seasons ==
The table below shows the seasons of Egri FC.

Season	Tier	Club's name	Position	Pts
2005–06	5	Egri FC	1 / 16	90
2006–07	4	Egri FC	1 / 16	75
2007–08	3	Egri FC	6 / 16	41
2008–09	3	Egri FC	11 / 16	36
2009–10	3	Egri FC	5 / 14	41
2010–11	3	Egri FC	1 / 16	76
2011–12	2	Egri FC	1 / 16	59
2012–13	1	Egri FC	16 / 16	15
2013–14	3	Egri FC	0 / 16	0

== Managers ==
- (Hungary) Antal Simon (June 2011 – Feb 13)
- (Hungary) Ferenc Mészáros (March 2013 – May 13)
- (Hungary) Csaba Vojtekovszki (May 2013–)

== Notable players ==
- (Czech Republic) Petr Knakal
