= List of foreign Nemzeti Bajnokság I players =

This is a list of foreign players in the Nemzeti Bajnokság I, which commenced play in 1901. The following players:

1. have played at least one Nemzeti Bajnokság I game for the respective club. Players who were signed by Nemzeti Bajnokság I clubs, but only played in lower league, cup and/or European games, or did not play in any competitive games at all, are not included.
2. have not been capped for the Hungary national team on any level.
3. have been born in Hungary and were capped by a foreign national team. This includes players who have dual citizenship with Hungary.

== Albania ==
- Berat Ahmeti – Újpest – 2014
- Jasir Asani - Kisvárda - 2021-
- Albion Avdijaj - Debrecen - 2018–19
- Naser Aliji – Honvéd – 2019–21
- Amir Bilali - Mezőkövesd - 2022
- Sulejman Demollari – Győr – 1996–97
- Albi Doka - Honvéd - 2022-
- Eros Grezda - Zalaegerszeg - 2021–22
- Liridon Latifi – Puskás Akadémia – 2017–19
- Kristi Marku – Honvéd – 2014–15
- Hysen Memolla - Diósgyőr - 2020–21
- Herdi Prenga - Kisvárda, Honvéd - 2021-
- Kamer Qaka - Mezőkövesd - 2022-
- Ylber Ramadani - MTK - 2021–22
- Erjon Rizvanolli - Tatabánya - 2005–06
- Odise Roshi - Diósgyőr - 2021
- Myrto Uzuni - Ferencváros - 2020–22

== Algeria ==
- Karim Benounes – Vasas – 2010–11
- Nacer Bouiche – Ferencváros – 1990–91; 1993–94
- Fouad Bouguerra – Nyíregyháza, Győr – 2010–11
- Badis Lebbihi – Kaposvár – 2014
- Meziane Touati – Ferencváros, Honvéd – 1996–99

== Angola ==
- Evandro Brandão - Videoton - 2011–13

== Argentina ==
- Carlos Auzqui - Ferencváros - 2022-
- Juan Briones - Győr - 2010–11
- Jeremías Buz - Diósgyőr - 2006–07
- Lucas Cariati - Újpest - 2006–07
- Edgardo Díaz - Kecskemét - 2013
- Luis Ibáñez - Győr - 2015
- Gastón Lodico - Ferencváros - 2020
- Carlos Marinelli - Győr - 2010–11
- Augusto Max - Diósgyőr - 2020–21
- Héctor Morales – Ferencváros – 2010–12
- Lucas Ontivero - Honvéd - 2015
- Matías Navarrete - Diósgyőr - 2007–09
- Matías Porcari - Honvéd - 2012
- Matías Rodríguez – Ferencvárosi – 2018–19
- Ivan Zaleh - Újpest, Nyíregyháza - 2007–09

== Armenia ==
- Abov Avetisyan - Kisvárda - 2020-
- Yeghia Yavruyan - Dunaferr, Sopron, Békéscsaba - 1998–99; 2001–04

== Australia ==
- Golgol Mebrahtu – Puskás Akadémia – 2019–20
- Sasa Radulovic - Újpest - 2007–08
- David Williams – Haladás – 2016–18

== Austria ==
- Ahmet Delić - Zalaegerszeg - 2010–12
- Emir Dilaver – Ferencváros – 2014–17
- Marco Djuricin – Ferencváros – 2016–17
- Elvir Hadžić - Videoton - 2017–19
- Daniel Kogler - Siófok - 2009
- Rolf Landerl - Sopron - 2005–06
- Manuel Martic - Mezőkövesd - 2020–21
- Slobodan Mihajlović - MTK - 2019
- Richard Niederbacher - Pécs - 1994–95
- Milan Oraze - Honvéd - 2004–06
- Thomas Piermayr – Békéscsaba – 2015–16
- Attila Raba - Haladás - 1996
- Philipp Schmiedl - Mezőkövesd - 2022
- Michael Stanislaw – Eger – 2012–13
- Peter Žulj - MOL Fehérvár - 2022

== Barbados ==
- Thierry Gale - Honvéd - 2020–22

== Belarus ==
- Alyaksandr Karnitsky - Mezőkövesd - 2019-
- Vladislav Klimovich - Gyirmót - 2022
- Oleg Korol - Ferencváros, Stadler, Gázszer - 1996–99
- Mikalay Signevich - Ferencváros - 2019–20
- Sergey Yasinsky - Stadler - 1997

== Belgium ==
- Naïm Aarab – Újpest – 2012–14
- Stanley Aborah – Ferencváros – 2013–15
- Samy Bourard - MOL Fehérvár - 2021
- Yassine El Ghanassy - Újpest - 2021
- Kylian Hazard – Újpest – 2015–17
- Jonathan Heris – Újpest, Puskás Akadémia – 2014–20
- Roland Lamah – Ferencváros – 2014–16
- Simon Ligot – Újpest – 2013–14
- Pieter Mbemba – Kaposvár – 2014
- Mohamed Mezghrani – Honvéd, Puskás Akadémia – 2019–
- Pierre-Yves Ngawa – Újpest – 2013–14
- Nikolas Proesmans – Újpest – 2012–14
- Kurt Vermeesch – Vasas – 1993–94
- Stef Wils – Haladás – 2015–18
- Thomas Wils – Haladás – 2015–16

== Benin ==
- Sidoine Oussou - Kecskemét - 2013

== Bolivia ==
- Vicente Arze - Diósgyőr - 2011–12

== Bosnia and Herzegovina ==
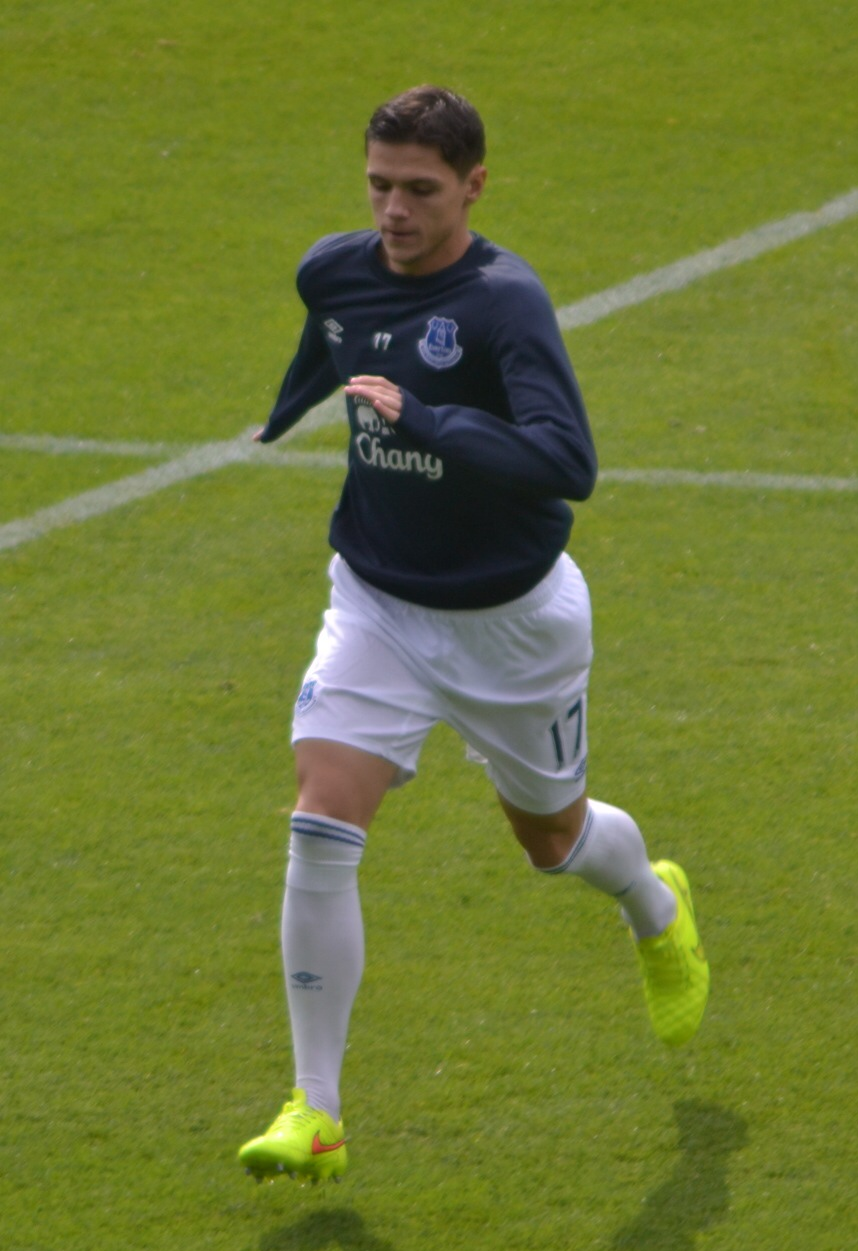
Muhamed Bešić spent two seasons with Ferencváros before moving to Premier League club Everton F.C. in 2014

- Sabahudin Agić - Nagykanizsa, Győr - 1994–96; 1999–00
- Eldin Adilović - Győr - 2010
- Muhamed Bešić – Ferencváros – 2012–14; 2021-
- Dino Beširović - Mezőkövesd - 2020-
- Mario Božić - Videoton, Újpest - 2004–09
- Dženan Bureković - Újpest - 2018–20; 2022-
- Eldar Ćivić - Ferencváros - 2019-
- Danijel Ćulum - Kaposvár - 2010
- Josip Ćutuk - Újpest - 2008–09
- Jusuf Dajić – Videoton, Vasas, Siófok – 2006–08; 2011–14
- Ognjen Đelmić – Debrecen – 2016–17
- Andrija Drljo - MTK - 2020–22
- Almir Filipović - BVSC, Nagykanizsa, Videoton, Siófok - 1993–95; 1996–97; 2003–04
- Amer Gojak - Ferencváros - 2022-
- Boris Gujić - Kaposvár - 2008–12
- Anel Hadžić – Videoton – 2016–20
- Emir Hadžić – Honvéd – 2012
- Emir Halilović - Zalaegerszeg - 2021–22
- Haris Handžić - Debrecen - 2017
- Armin Hodžić – Fehérvár – 2018–22
- Adnan Hrelja - Pécs - 2011–12
- Senad Husić – Diósgyőr – 2013–16
- Nikola Jokišić - Pécs - 2002–03
- Aleksandar Jovanović – Ferencváros – 2011–14
- Marin Jurina - Mezőkövesd - 2020–22
- Djordje Kamber – Diósgyőr, Zalaegerszeg, Győr, Honvéd – 2008–21
- Almin Kapić - Stadler - 1994–95
- Kenan Kodro - MOL Fehérvár - 2021-
- Adnan Kovačević - Ferencváros - 2020-
- Stjepan Lončar - Ferencváros - 2021–22
- Darko Ljubojević - Zalaegerszeg - 2001–06; 2006–07
- Vladimir Marković - Pécs - 2012
- Haris Mehmedagić - Vasas - 2011–12
- Dalio Memić - Kecskemét - 2010
- Jasmin Mešanović - Kisvárda - 2021-
- Bojan Mihajlović – Újpest – 2011–14
- Emil Miljković - Ferencváros - 2010–11
- Romeo Mitrović - Kecskemét - 2008–10
- Stevo Nikolić – Debrecen – 2011–14
- Branko Ojdanić - Pécs - 2015
- Tomislav Stanić - Diósgyőr - 2006–07
- Miroslav Stevanović - Győr - 2014–15
- Jovica Stokić - Honvéd, Kecskemét - 2010–11; 2011–12
- Asmir Suljić - Újpest, Videoton, Diósgyőr – 2013–18; 2021
- Duško Vranešević - Diósgyőr - 2008–09

== Brazil ==
- Alef - MOL Fehérvár - 2020-
- Adriano Alves – Ferencváros – 2010–11
- André Alves – Honvéd, Kaposvár, Videoton, Mezőkövesd – 2005–08; 2009–12; 2018
- Juliano Alves - Videoton - 1995–96
- William Alves – Diósgyőr – 2013–15
- Andrezinho – Ferencváros – 2010–12
- Diego Balbinot - Nyíregyháza - 2010
- Bruno Dos Santos Bosi - Vasas - 2010
- Guilherme Brandelli - Pápa - 2005–06
- Diego Carioca - Zalaegerszeg - 2022-
- Celso - Nyíregyháza - 2004–05
- Nicolás Ceolin – Győr, Honvéd, Pécs - 2009–13
- Charleston - Debrecen - 2021-
- Coelho - Debrecen - 2004–05
- Danilo – Honvéd – 2010–12; 2017–19
- Leandro da Silva - Kaposvár - 2007–08
- Mauro da Silva - Tatabánya - 1999–00
- Alex De Paula - Pápa, Szolnok, 2009–11
- Diego - Honvéd - 2006–10
- Marcelo Dluzniewski - Vác - 2007
- Edson - Videoton - 2012–14
- Élder - Pápa - 2006
- Eliomar - Kecskemét - 2013–14
- Evandro - MOL Fehérvár - 2020–22
- Fábio - Puskás Akadémia, Békéscsaba - 2013–16
- Felipe – Kisvárda – 2018–20
- Felipe Félix – Ferencváros – 2011
- Júnior Fell - Ferencváros - 2013
- Geovanni Fraga Fretta - Vác - 2007
- Bernardo Frizoni – Diósgyőr, Pápa – 2011–12; 2014–15
- Gerson - Ferencváros - 2013–14
- Giba Gilberto - MTK - 1998–99
- Fabrizio Gonçalves - Tatabánya, Honvéd - 1999–02
- Gugu - Siófok - 1997–98
- Franciel Hengemühle - Debrecen - 2005
- Isael – Ferencváros – 2019–21
- Jerson - Siófok, Vasas, Tatabánya, 2000; 2004–05; 2005–06
- Jhonnes - Újpest - 2011
- Ji-Paraná – Győr – 2010–12
- Jorginho - Kecskemét - 2012–13
- Jucemar - Újpest - 2008–10
- Julinho - Videoton - 2001–02; 2006–07
- Júnior – Kaposvár, Ferencváros – 2009–12
- Kaká - Videoton - 2012–13
- Fábio Kolling - Sopron - 2007
- Leandro - Vác - 2007
- Matheus Leoni - Kisvárda - 2021-
- Maikel - Haladás - 2008–10
- Marquinhos - Ferencváros - 2022-
- Bruno Moraes – Újpest – 2012–13
- Moreira - Honvéd - 2008–11
- Myke - MTK, Haladás 2015–19; 2020–21
- Renato Neto - Videoton - 2012
- Nildo - Videoton - 2013–14
- Fabio de Oliveira - Pápa - 2008
- Marquinhos Pedroso - Ferencváros - 2017–18
- Pedro Sass Petrazzi – Kaposvár – 2010–13
- Anderson Pico – Kisvárda – 2018–20
- Flávio Pim - Debrecen - 2003–05
- Prado - Vác - 2007
- Reginaldo Regis - Siófok - 1997–98
- Thiago Ribeiro - Siófok, Dunaújváros - 2010–11; 2014–15
- Robson - Kecskemét - 2008–10
- Lucas Rocha - Kaposvár - 2013
- César Romero - Videoton - 2008–09
- Roni - Siófok - 2008–09; 2010–11
- Sassá – Kisvárda – 2018–21
- Alison Silva - Videoton, Ferencváros - 2009–11
- Jeff Silva – Videoton, Diósgyőr – 2012–13
- Somália – Ferencváros – 2012–15; 2020–22
- Talys - Honvéd - 2021
- Tanque - Eger - 2012–13
- Tarabai - Kecskemét - 2012–13
- Cristiano Thomas - Vác - 2007
- Marco Túlio - Debrecen - 2007
- Túlio – Újpest – 2002
- Fernando Viana - Kisvárda, Újpest - 2020–22
- Vinicius - Debrecen - 2008–10; 2012–13
- Welton - MTK, Pápa, Nyíregyháza - 2003–06; 2007–08
- Weslen Júnior - Puskás Akadémia - 2020–22

== Bulgaria ==
- Plamen Andreev - Debrecen - 2026
- Preslav Borukov - Zalaegerszeg - 2021
- Ivo Georgiev - Debrecen, Honvéd - 1990–93; 2000–01
- Kamen Hadzhiev - Puskás Akadémia - 2019–21
- Galin Ivanov – Haladás – 2019
- Yanis Karabelyov - Kisvárda - 2021-
- Georgi Korudzhiev – Sopron, Békéscsaba – 2006–07; 2015–16
- Dimitar Makriev - Pécs - 2015
- Georgi Milanov - MOL Fehérvár - 2018–20
- Antonio Vutov - Mezőkövesd - 2020–22

== Cameroon ==
- Mohamadou Abdouraman - Diósgyőr, Nyíregyháza - 2011–15
- Arouna Baba - Diósgyőr - 2007–08
- Steve Bessong - Diósgyőr - 2007–08
- Makadji Boukar - Vasas - 2011–12
- Petrus Boumal - Újpest - 2022-
- Dani Chigou - Debrecen - 2008
- Fabrice Deffo - Sopron - 2007–08
- Dennis Dourandi - Újpest - 2007–08
- Christian Ebala - Diósgyőr, Újpest, Kecskemét - 2007–08; 2010–12; 2013–14
- Georges Ekounda - Siófok - 2009
- Etogo Essama - Debrecen - 2010
- Eugene Fomumbod - Győr, Siófok - 2008–12
- Douva Halidou - Diósgyőr - 2006–08
- Justice Jessy - Vasas - 1994–96
- Thomas Job – Honvéd – 2013–14
- Papson Kanga Joseph - Diósgyőr - 2007
- Dorge Kouemaha - Tatabánya, Debrecen - 2005–08
- Yves Mboussi - Nyíregyháza - 2007–10
- Justin Mengolo – Debrecen – 2017–18
- George Menougong - Nyíregyháza, Diósgyőr, Mezőkövesd - 2007–08; 2009–10; 2011–12; 2013–14
- Patrick Mevoungou - Győr, Mezőkövesd, Diósgyőr, Puskás Akadémia, Kisvárda - 2013–14; 2016–19
- Edouard Ndjodo - Tatabánya, Honvéd, Siófok - 2005–09
- Michel Ndoumbé - Újpest - 1995–96
- Yannick Ndzoumou - Diósgyőr - 2019
- Joseph Ngalle - Tatabánya, Szolnok - 2005–07; 2010–11
- MacDonald Niba – Honvéd – 2019–20
- Ismaila Ousman - Diósgyőr - 2019
- Njongo Priso - Győr - 2015
- Effeyie Stephane Roger - Diósgyőr - 2008
- Haman Sadjo - Diósgyőr, Újpest, Honvéd - 2006–08; 2009–11
- Hervé Tchami – Szolnok, Honvéd – 2010–13
- Joël Tchami - Eger - 2012–13
- Abdoulaye Yahaya - Újpest - 2021–22
- Mbengono Yannick – Honvéd, Kecskemét, Debrecen, Pápa – 2005–06; 2008–13; 2015
- Eric Zambo - Honvéd - 2006

== Canada ==
- Stefan Cebara - Zalaegerszeg - 2010–11
- Richie Ennin - Honvéd - 2022-
- Manjrekar James – Pécs, Diósgyőr, Vasas – 2014–18
- Franco Lalli - Pápa - 2006
- Joevannie Peart - Pápa - 2006
- Igor Pisanjuk – Ferencváros, Szolnok, Eger – 2009–11; 2012–13
- Dave Simpson - Pápa - 2005–06

== Cape Verde ==
- Stopira – Videoton – 2012-
- Zé Luís - Videoton - 2013–14

== Central African Republic ==
- Foxi Kéthévoama - Diósgyőr, Újpest, Kecskemét - 2006–12
- Wilfrid Oueifio - Kaposvár - 2008

== Colombia ==
- Darwin Andrade - Újpest - 2014
- José Cortés - Diósgyőr - 2020–21
- Sebastián Herrera - MTK - 2020–22
- Edixon Perea – Honvéd – 2013–14
- César Quintero – Pápa – 2010–15

== Congo ==
- Francis Litsingi – Újpest, Kecskemét – 2008–13
- Jean-Claude Mbemba – Vasas – 1990–96
- Jean-Pierre Zabundu - Siófok- 1999–00

== Congo DR ==
- Kadima Kabangu – Honvéd – 2016–18
- Rosy Lubaki - Újpest - 2018–20
- Christy Manzinga - Zalaegerszeg - 2022-
- Moto Adede Moke - Vasas - 1995–96
- Landry Mulemo – Kaposvár – 2014
- Bavon Tshibuabua – Újpest – 2012–14

== Costa Rica ==
- Mayron George - Honvéd - 2020

== Croatia ==
- Stjepan Babić - Kaposvár - 2013–14
- Valentin Babić - Győr - 2009–12
- Stipe Bacelic-Grgic – Puskás Akadémia, Mezőkövesd – 2015–18
- Ante Batarelo - Haladás, Balmazújváros - 2015–16; 2017–18
- Roko Baturina - Ferencváros - 2020-
- Alen Bjelić - Ferencváros - 1998–99
- Boris Bjelkanović - Honvéd - 2011–12
- Marko Brtan - Mezőkövesd - 2022-
- Marijan Čabraja - Ferencváros - 2021–22
- Luka Capan - Honvéd - 2022-
- Andrej Čaušić – Pécs – 2011–13; 2014–15
- Niko Datković - Kisvárda - 2020–21
- Marko Dinjar - Győr, Puskás Akadémia, Mezőkövesd - 2009–17
- Luka Dominić - Kaposvár - 2013–14
- Josip Elez - Honvéd - 2015
- Igor Gal - Diósgyőr - 2009–10; 2011–13
- Dino Gavrić - Dunaújváros - 2014–15
- Dejan Godar - Szeged - 1999–00
- Alen Grgić - Diósgyőr - 2021
- Mato Grgić – MTK Budapest – 2015–17
- Šime Gržan - Zalaegerszeg - 2022-
- Ronald Habi - Debrecen, Újpest, Siófok - 2003–09
- Tomislav Havojic – Ferencváros – 2014–15
- Ivan Herceg - Puskás Akadémia - 2015–16
- Ivor Horvat - Puskás Akadémia - 2017
- Marko Iharoš - Budafok - 2020–21
- Frane Ikić - Gyirmót - 2021–22
- Hrvoje Jančetić - Győr - 2003–04
- Karlo Kamenar - Mezőkövesd - 2021
- Marko Kartelo - Győr - 2001–05
- Matija Katanec - Mezőkövesd, Zalaegerszeg - 2018–22
- Renato Kelić - Puskás Akadémia - 2014–16
- Tomislav Kiš - Mezőkövesd - 2022-
- Josip Knežević - Puskás Akadémia - 2017–21
- Dominik Kovačić - Kisvárda - 2022-
- Robert Kovačić - Zalaegerszeg - 1996–97
- Tonći Kukoč – Honvéd, Kisvárda – 2018–20
- Stjepan Kukuruzović – Ferencváros – 2014–15
- Tomislav Labudović - Honvéd - 2011
- Tino Lagator - Pápa - 2013
- Zoran Lesjak - Zalaegerszeg - 2019-
- Ivan Lovrić - Kecskemét, Honvéd, 2008–09; 2010-
- Andrej Lukić - Mezőkövesd - 2022-
- Davor Magoč - Honvéd - 2008–09
- Marko Malenica - Diósgyőr - 2021
- Antonio Mance - Puskás Akadémia - 2020–21
- Mirko Marić - Videoton - 2017
- Luka Marin - Diósgyőr - 2021
- Marin Matoš - Újpest - 2010–11
- Tomislav Mazalović - Diósgyőr - 2018–19
- Haris Mehmedagić – Vasas – 2011
- Damir Milanović - Videoton - 2009–11
- Goran Milović - Diósgyőr - 2021-
- Benedik Mioč – Puskás Akadémia – 2018–19
- Matija Mišić - Kisvárda - 2018–19
- Frano Mlinar - Mezőkövesd - 2017–18
- Marijan Nikolić - Nyíregyháza, Pápa - 2004–06
- Vedran Nikšić - Győr - 2011
- Stjepan Oštrek - Zalaegerszeg - 2020
- Antun Palić - Kaposvár - 2020
- Goran Paracki – Pécs – 2012
- Milan Pavličić - Videoton - 2008–09
- Mateo Pavlović – Ferencváros – 2014–15
- Goran Perak - Kecskemét - 2009–10
- Darko Perić - Győr, Zalaegerszeg - 2002–06
- Marko Perković - MTK - 2021–22
- Antonio Perošević - Puskás Akadémia, Újpest - 2017–18; 2019–21
- Jurica Pranjić - Vasas - 2011–12
- Miljenko Pribisalić - Békéscsaba - 2004–05
- Jakov Puljić - Puskás Akadémia - 2021-
- Anto Radeljić - Gyirmót - 2017
- Ivan Radoš - Diósgyőr - 2009–19
- Božidar Radošević - Debrecen - 2015–16
- Besnik Ramadani - Zalaegerszeg - 2007–08
- Mihael Rebernik - Zalaegerszeg - 2022
- Danijel Romić - Pécs, Vasas, Budafok - 2013–16; 2020–21
- Nikola Šafarić - Kaposvár - 2011–13
- Dajan Šimac - Debrecen - 2010–13
- Marko Šimić – Vasas, Ferencváros – 2011–12
- Žankarlo Šimunić - Békéscsaba - 2003–05
- Dino Škvorc – Honvéd – 2018–19
- Vinko Soldo - Diósgyőr - 2021
- Josip Špoljarić - Zalaegerszeg - 2021–22
- Mario Tadejević - Pécs - 2015
- Sandro Tomić - Debrecen, Honvéd - 2002–07
- Dinko Trebotić - Videoton, Kaposvár - 2014–16; 2020
- Aljoša Vojnović – Kaposvár – 2019–20
- Bojan Vručina – Kaposvár – 2012–14
- Lovre Vulin - Zalaegerszeg - 2007–08
- Ivor Weitzer - Pécs - 2015
- Diego Živulić - Diósgyőr - 2021

== Curaçao ==
- Quenten Martinus - Ferencváros - 2013
- Prince Rajcomar – Zalaegerszeg – 2009–11
- Gino van Kessel - Gyirmót - 2022

== Cyprus ==
- Fanos Katelaris - Zalaegerszeg - 2020

== Czech Republic ==
- Vít Beneš - Vasas, Haladás - 2017–18
- Denis Granečný - Mezőkövesd - 2022
- Josef Hamouz - Eger - 2012–13
- Jaroslav Hauzner - Videoton, Siófok - 1992–94
- Marek Heinz – Ferencváros – 2010–11
- Jiří Kabele - Eger - 2012–13
- Martin Klein – Ferencváros – 2011–13
- Petr Knakal - Eger - 2012–13
- Libor Kozák - Puskás Akadémia - 2021–22
- Jiří Krejčí – Pécs – 2012–13
- Michael Lüftner - MOL Fehérvár - 2021–22
- Jaroslav Navrátil - Kisvárda - 2020-
- Jan Nečas – Tatabánya – 2006–07
- Tomáš Pilík – Honvéd – 2018
- Jakub Plšek - Puskás Akadémia - 2020-
- Michael Rabušic - Haladás - 2018–19
- Miroslav Rada - Vasas - 2004–05
- Michal Šilhavý - Honvéd - 2004–05
- Jan Šimůnek - Vasas - 2017–18
- Marek Střeštík – Győr, MTK, Mezőkövesd – 2012–18
- Patrizio Stronati - Puskás Akadémia - 2021-
- Michal Švec – Győr – 2012–15
- Robert Vágner - Újpest, Ferencváros - 2001–02; 2004–05
- David Vaněček – Puskás Akadémia, Diósgyőr – 2019–21
- Jan Vosahlik – Mezőkövesd – 2016–17
- Lukáš Zelenka – Honvéd - 2011–12

== Denmark ==
- Kenneth Christiansen - Ferencváros - 1994–95
- Kasper Larsen - MOL Fehérvár - 2022-
- Rajko Lekić - Zalaegerszeg - 2007
- Emil Lyng - Haladás - 2018–19
- Rasmus Thelander - Ferencváros - 2022-

== Dominican Republic ==
- Heinz Mörschel – Újpest – 2023–

== Ecuador ==
- Augusto Batioja - Diósgyőr - 2013–14
- Bryan de Jesús – Puskás Akadémia – 2018
- Cristian Ramírez – Ferencváros – 2015–17

== Egypt ==
- Sherif Sadek - Zalaegerszeg - 2011

== El Salvador ==
- Arturo Alvarez – Videoton – 2013–15
- Rafael Burgos – Kecskemét, Győr – 2012–14

== England ==
- James Ashmore – Ferencváros – 2009–10
- Anthony Elding – Ferencváros – 2010
- Nathan Eccleston – Békéscsaba – 2016
- Nikon El Maestro - Újpest - 2012
- Matthew Lowton – Ferencváros – 2009
- Scott Malone - Újpest - 2009
- Gary Martin - Újpest - 2010
- Brandon Ormonde-Ottewill - Puskás Akadémia - 2022-
- Rohan Ricketts - Diósgyőr - 2010
- Paul Shaw – Ferencváros – 2009–10
- Sam Stockley – Ferencváros – 2010–11
- Tony Stokes - Újpest - 2009–10
- Sam Wedgbury – Ferencváros – 2009
- James Weir - MTK - 2021–22

== Estonia ==
- Jarmo Ahjupera – Győr, Újpest – 2009–14
- Martin Hurt - Nyíregyháza - 2010
- Tarmo Kink – Győr, Kaposvár, Mezőkövesd – 2008–10; 2012–14; 2016–17
- Märten Kuusk - Újpest - 2022-
- Igor Morozov - Debrecen - 2013–15
- Artur Pikk - Diósgyőr - 2021
- Sander Puri - Pápa - 2011
- Vjatšeslav Zahovaiko - Debrecen - 2011–12

== Finland ==
- Nikolai Alho - MTK - 2021–22
- Juha Hakola – Ferencváros – 2011–13
- Antonio Inutile - Pápa - 2012
- Aristote M'Boma - Újpest - 2014
- Urho Nissilä – Puskas Akadémia – 2024–
- Paulus Roiha - Újpest - 2007–08
- Mikael Soisalo – Puskas Akadémia – 2023–

== France ==
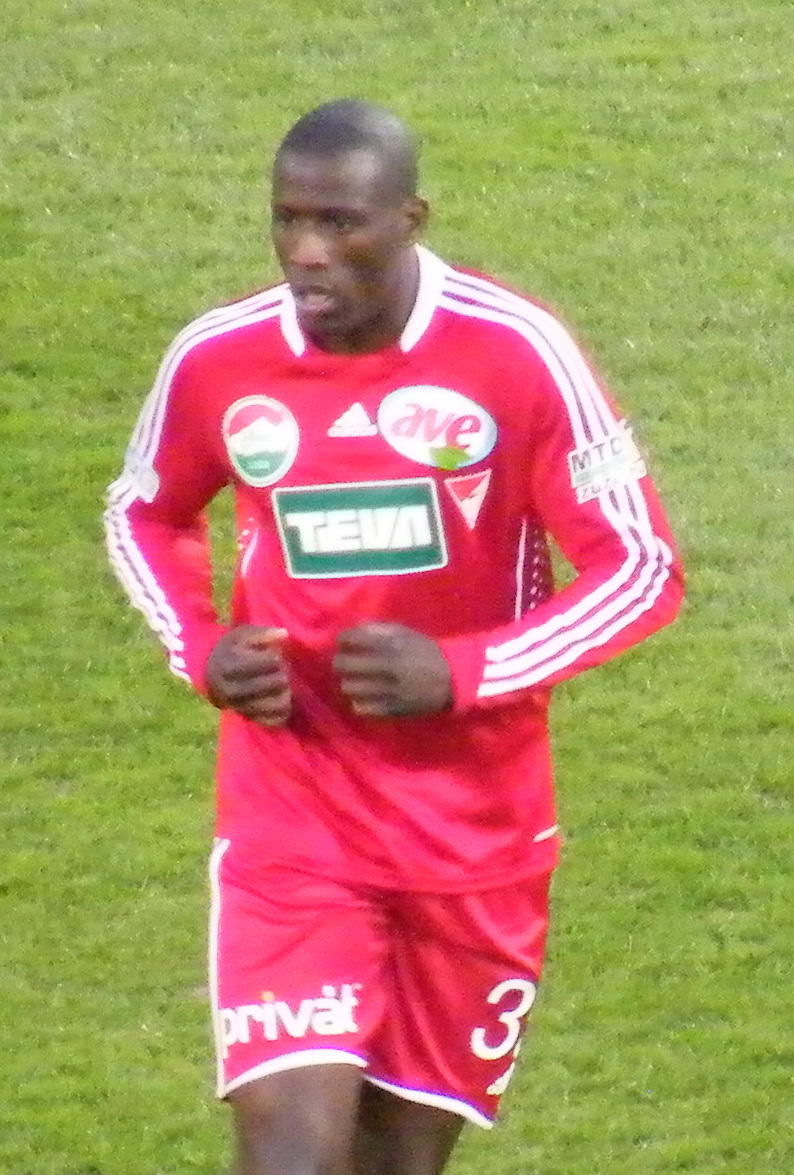
Adamo Coulibaly became top-scorer twice with Debrecen in 2011–12 and 2012–13 seasons

- Nacim Abdelali - Nyíregyháza - 2009–10
- Selim Bouadla - Debrecen - 2011–15
- Slimane Bouadla - Debrecen - 2012–14
- Joël Cantona – Újpest – 1992–93
- Grégory Christ – Újpest – 2012–14
- Adamo Coulibaly – Debrecen – 2009–13; 2015–16
- Yohan Croizet - Újpest - 2021-
- Julien Dacosta - Debrecen - 2025-present
- Joël Damahou - Debrecen - 2013–14
- Mamadou Danfa - Vasas - 2010
- Sylvain Deslandes - Debrecen - 2021-
- Mahamadou Diawara - Zalaegerszeg - 2007–08
- Brandon Domingues - Honvéd - 2022-
- Lyes Houri - MOL Fehérvár - 2020–21; 2022-
- Ismaël Koné - Eger - 2013
- Yohann Lasimant - Eger - 2013
- Zinédine Machach - Honvéd - 2021–22
- Xavier Mercier - Ferencváros - 2022-
- Péguy N'Gam - Diósgyőr - 2007–08
- David Ngog – Honvéd – 2018–20
- Jean-Baptiste Paternotte - Haladás - 2010
- Karim Rouani - Honvéd - 2010–11
- l´Imam Seydi – Diósgyőr, Debrecen, Nyíregyháza – 2011–15
- Gary Tavars - Honvéd - 2010–11
- Jimmy Jones Tchana - Debrecen, Sopron, Diósgyőr - 2007–09
- Mamadou Wagué - Puskás Akadémia - 2013

== Gabon ==
- Arsène Copa - Győr - 2007–12
- Thierry Issiémou - Debrecen, Vasas - 2007–08
- Brice Mackaya - Vasas, Vác - 1994–96
- Roguy Méyé – Zalaegerszeg, Debrecen – 2007–09; 2011–12

== Gambia ==
- Lamin Colley - Puskás Akadémia - 2022-
- Haruna Jammeh – Kaposvár – 2011–14
- Lamin Jallow - MOL Fehérvár - 2021–22

== Georgia ==
- Rati Aleksidze – Győr – 2009–13
- Bachana Arabuli – Balmazújváros, Puskás Akadémia – 2017–19
- Zurab Arziani - Nyíregyháza - 2015
- Giorgi Beridze - Újpest - 2018–19; 2020–22
- Kakhaber Chkhetiani - Debrecen, Pécs - 2001–03
- Dato Dartsimelia – Nyíregyháza – 2015
- Murtaz Daushvili – Diósgyőr, Haladás – 2016–17; 2018–19
- Lasha Dvali – Ferencváros – 2019–22
- Giorgi Ganugrava – Győr, Pápa, Zalaegerszeg – 2009–12
- Davit Imedashvili - Nyíregyháza - 2009
- Givi Ioseliani - Kecskemét - 2013
- Nodar Kavtaradze - Mezőkövesd - 2021
- Giorgi Kharaishvili - Ferencváros - 2021-
- Giorgi Kvilitaia - Győr - 2013–15
- Luka Lakvekheliani - Mezőkövesd - 2020-
- Irakli Maisuradze - Balmazújváros - 2017–18
- David Odikadze - Győr - 2009
- Vakhtang Pantskhava - Győr, Vasas - 2010–11
- Teimuraz Sharashenidze - Győr - 2010–11
- Lasha Shindagoridze - Balmazújváros - 2018
- Lasha Totadze – Győr, Pápa – 2010–12
- Budu Zivzivadze - Mezőkövesd, MOL Fehérvár, Újpest - 2019-

== Germany ==
- Yusuf-Muri Adewunmi – Honvéd – 2007–08
- Philipp Bönig – Ferencváros – 2012–15
- Pascal Borel – Honvéd – 2007–08
- Felix Burmeister – Vasas – 2016–18
- Marcel Heister - Ferencváros, MOL Fehérvár - 2018-
- Oliver Hüsing – Ferencváros – 2016–17
- Luis Jakobi - Újpest - 2022-
- Darius Kampa - Zalaegerszeg - 2006–07
- Julian Koch – Ferencváros - 2017–19
- Benjamin Lauth – Ferencváros – 2014–15
- Luca Mack - Újpest - 2021-
- Marko Marin - Ferencváros - 2021–22
- Thomas Meißner – Puskás Akadémia – 2019–21
- Christian Müller – Vasas – 2016
- Reagy Ofosu – Haladás – 2018–19
- Janek Sternberg – Ferencváros - 2017–18
- Florian Trinks – Ferencváros – 2016–17
- Esad Veledar - Honvéd - 2008

== Ghana ==
- Aaron Addo Dankwah - Kaposvár, Újpest - 2012–15
- William Amamoo - Sopron - 2006–07
- Felix Ankamah - Sopron - 2006–07
- Ellis Samuel Ato - Kaposvár, Pécs - 2008–09; 2011–12
- Nasiru Banahene - MTK - 2019
- Abraham Frimpong - Ferencváros - 2018–21
- Bradley Hudson-Odoi - Vasas - 2011–12
- Mohammed Kadiri - Honvéd - 2022
- Emmanuel Mensah - Honvéd - 2014
- Clinton Osei - MTK - 2020–22
- Princeton Owusu-Ansah - Nyíregyháza - 2004
- Joseph Paintsil - Ferencváros - 2017–18
- Emeka Unaka - BVSC - 1994–95

== Greece ==
- Vassilios Apostolopoulos – Puskás Akadémia – 2013
- Thodoris Berios – Kisvárda FC – 2018–20
- Konstantinos Dimitriou - Mezőkövesd - 2021
- Lazaros Fotias - Kaposvár - 2013
- Ilias Ignatidis - Vasas - 2016
- Nikolaos Ioannidis - Diósgyőr - 2017–18
- Panagiotis Kermanidis - MTK - 1971–73
- Georgios Koutroumpis - Újpest - 2020–22
- Alexandros Kyziridis - Debrecen - 2022-
- Georgios Neofytidis - Debrecen - 2022-
- Stavros Tsoukalas – Kisvárda – 2019–21
- Nikos Vergos - Vasas - 2017–18

== Grenada ==
- Kemon Thomas – MTK – 2004

== Guadeloupe ==
- Jean-Pierre Morgan - Honvéd - 2015

== Guinea ==
- Fousseni Bamba – Honvéd – 2018–19
- Ousmane N'Gom Camara - Újpest - 1997
- Moustapha Diallo – Kaposvár – 2011–13
- Jean-Louis Keita - Újpest - 1997
- Pato - Kecskemét - 2013–14
- Alhassane Soumah - Videoton - 2015–16
- Sylla - Haladás, Tatabánya - 1998–00
- Souleymane Youla – Honvéd – 2014–16

== Guinea-Bissau ==
- Mamadu Candé - Videoton - 2013–14
- Saná Gomes - Debrecen - 2022-

== Honduras ==
- Luis Ramos – Nyíregyháza, Debrecen, Kecskemét – 2008–13

== Iceland ==
- Aron Bjarnason - Újpest - 2019–21
- Kjartan Finnbogason – Ferencváros – 2018–19
- Viðar Ari Jónsson - Honvéd - 2022-

== Iran ==
- Amir Hashemi – Vasas – 1990–91
- Nadir Mir Ahmadian - Vasas - 1991
- Shahab Zahedi - Puskás Akadémia - 2022-
- Mohamed Ziai - Vasas - 1990

== Israel ==
- Nir Bardea - Honvéd - 2021–22
- Robi Levkovich – Honvéd – 2019–20
- Maxim Plakuschenko - Honvéd - 2022-
- Yadin Zaris – Újpest – 2012

== Italy ==
- Raffaele Alcibiade – Honvéd, Haladás – 2013–16
- Emiliano Bonazzoli - Honvéd - 2014
- Giuseppe Borrello - Újpest - 2022-
- Gabriele Fabris - Kaposvár - 2010
- Christian Galliano - Sopron - 2007–08
- Federico Groppioni – MTK – 2010–17
- Davide Lanzafame – Honvéd, Ferencváros – 2013, 2016–20
- Arturo Lupoli – Honvéd – 2014
- Andrea Mancini – Honvéd, Haladás – 2013–15
- Leandro Martínez – Honvéd, Győr, Haladás, MTK– 2013–17
- Federico Moretti – Honvéd – 2019
- Luca Pinton - Sopron - 2006–07
- Riccardo Piscitelli - Mezőkövesd - 2021-
- Tommaso Rocchi – Haladás – 2014–15
- Luigi Sartor – Sopron – 2006
- Nicola Silvestri – Sopron – 2005–06
- Giuseppe Signori – Sopron – 2005–06
- Emanuele Testardi – Honvéd – 2013
- Angelo Vaccaro - Honvéd - 2010

== Ivory Coast ==
- Jean-Baptiste Akassou - Honvéd, Pécs - 2010–13
- Benjamin Angoua – Honvéd - 2005–10
- Franck Boli - Ferencváros - 2019-
- Souleymane Diaby – Honvéd – 2011–13
- Sindou Dosso – Nyíregyháza, Kecskemét – 2008–12
- Abraham Gneki Guié – Honvéd - 2006–10
- Fernand Gouré - Újpest - 2022-
- Georges Griffiths – Pápa, Diósgyőr – 2013–17
- Abdul Kader Keïta – Honvéd – 2014–15
- Mory Koné - Újpest - 2021–22
- Jean-Paul Nomel - Siófok - 2011
- Junior Tallo - Újpest - 2020-
- Kandia Traoré – Honvéd – 2014
- Lacina Traoré – Újpest – 2019

== Jamaica ==
- Jason Morrison – Ferencváros – 2009–10
- Rafe Wolfe – Ferencváros, MTK, Győr – 2009–11; 2012–14

== Japan ==
- Kazuo Homma – Pápa, Diósgyőr, Nyíregyháza, Siófok, Vasas – 2005–11

== Kosovo ==
- Florent Hasani – Diósgyőr, Gyirmót – 2018–22
- Lirim M. Kastrati - MOL Fehérvár - 2022-
- Lirim R. Kastrati - Újpest - 2020-
- Ilir Nallbani - Tatabánya - 2006

== Latvia ==
- Rolands Bulders - Stadler - 1996–97
- Aleksandrs Čekulajevs - Pápa - 2012–13
- Deniss Ivanovs - Nyíregyháza - 2015
- Vitālijs Jagodinskis - Diósgyőr - 2016–17
- Aleksandrs Jeļisejevs - Stadler - 1996
- Vitālijs Meļņičenko - Szolnok - 2011
- Artjoms Rudņevs - Zalaegerszeg - 2009–10
- Igors Tarasovs - Kaposvár - 2020
- Daniils Turkovs - Zalaegerszeg - 2011–12
- Mihails Zemļinskis - BVSC - 1994
- Vadims Žuļevs - Pápa - 2009–11; 2014–15

== Liberia ==
- Joachim Adukor - Diósgyőr - 2019–20
- Victor Carr - Diósgyőr, Haladás - 2007; 2009
- Mle Collins - Tiszakécske - 1997–98
- George Gebro - Honvéd - 2008–09
- John Moses - Honvéd - 1996–97
- Frank Seator – Pécs, Videoton – 1995–97
- Philip Tarlue - Honvéd - 1996–98

== Lithuania ==
- Vytautas Karvelis - Videoton - 1997–98
- Mindaugas Malinauskas - Diósgyőr, Debrecen - 2010–12
- Eimantas Marozas - Szolnok - 2010–11
- Linas Pilibaitis – Győr, Mezőkövesd – 2009–14
- Valdas Urbonas - Videoton, Gázszer - 1997–99
- Robertas Zalys - Zalaegerszeg - 1991–92

== Mali ==
- Abdoulaye Diaby - Újpest - 2021-
- Mamadou Diakité – Honvéd – 2012–13
- Alassane Diallo - Újpest - 2017–19
- Ulysse Diallo - Ferencváros, Mezőkövesd, Puskás Akadémia, MTK - 2013–14; 2016–19; 2020–21
- Drissa Diarra – Honvéd – 2012–14
- Souleymane Diarra - Újpest - 2016–17
- Bakary Nimaga - Zalaegerszeg - 2021–22
- Abdou Tangara - Honvéd - 2005
- Adama Traoré - Ferencváros - 2022-
- Boubacar Traoré - Honvéd - 2020-

== Malta ==
- Justin Haber – Ferencváros – 2009–11
- Rowen Muscat - Dunaújváros - 2014
- André Schembri – Ferencváros – 2010–11

== Martinique ==
- Rémi Maréval - Videoton - 2015

== Mexico ==
- Jesús Flores - Tatabánya - 2008
- David Izazola - Honvéd - 2015
- Kichi - Tatabánya - 2007–08
- Aquino Orlando - Sopron - 2007
- José Manuel Rivera - Honvéd - 2007

== Moldova ==
- Serghei Alexeev – Kaposvár – 2011–12
- Valerij Capatina - Nyíregyháza - 1998
- Artur Crăciun - Honvéd - 2020–22

== Mongolia ==
- Ganbayar Ganbold – Puskás Akadémia – 2020-

== Montenegro ==
- Jovo Aranitović - Győr - 2003–04
- Jovan Baošić - Újpest - 2020–21
- Ivan Bojović - Zalaegerszeg - 2005–06
- Mijuško Bojović - Gyirmót, Újpest - 2016–19
- Bojan Božović - Békéscsaba, Honvéd, Kaposvár, Siófok - 2004–09; 2011–12
- Mladen Božović – Videoton – 2010–13
- Bojan Brnović - Debrecen, Győr, Diósgyőr - 2005–10
- Boris Bulajić - Kecskemét - 2013–14
- Driton Camaj - Kisvárda - 2020-
- Đorđije Ćetković - Győr - 2010
- Ivan Delić - Zalaegerszeg - 2011–12
- Stefan Denković - Puskás Akadémia - 2014–15
- Meldin Drešković - Debrecen - 2022-
- Uroš Đuranović - Kecskemét - 2022-
- Nenad Đurović - Szolnok - 2011
- Ivan Janjušević - Vasas - 2011
- Vlado Jeknić - Diósgyőr - 2009–10
- Darko Karadžić - Videoton - 2010
- Nebojša Kosović – Újpest – 2014
- Dušan Lagator - Debrecen - 2022-
- Igor Lambulić - Kaposvár - 2009–10
- Darko Marković - Újpest - 2011–12
- Milan Mijatović - MTK - 2020–22
- Darko Nikač – MTK Budapest – 2016–17
- Darko Pavićević – Zalaegerszeg, Kecskemét – 2009–12; 2014
- Vladan Peličić - Kecskemét - 2009
- Mihailo Perović - Újpest - 2015–17
- Danijel Petković - MTK - 2016–17
- Vukašin Poleksić – Tatabánya, Debrecen, Kecskemét, Pécs, Békéscsaba, Vasas – 2005–10; 2012–17
- Milan Purović - Videoton - 2009
- Ilija Radović - Videoton - 2008–11
- Marko Radulović - MTK - 2008–09
- Bojan Sanković – Újpest, Zalaegerszeg – 2013–
- Vladan Savić – Kecskemét – 2007–
- Marko Šćepanović - Pécs - 2011–12
- Radislav Sekulić - Honvéd - 2011
- Marko Simić - Honvéd - 2008–09
- Mićo Smiljanić - Diósgyőr, MTK, Honvéd - 1998–99; 2000–03; 2006–09
- Petar Stanišić - Nyíregyháza, Szolnok - 2010
- Pavle Velimirović - Kecskemét - 2008–10
- Marko Vidović – Honvéd, Eger – 2012–13; 2014–15
- Goran Vujović - Videoton, Kecskemét, Haladás, Eger - 2008–12
- Vladimir Vujović - Vasas - 2009
- Marko Vukasović - Kecskemét, Vasas - 2012–15

== Morocco ==
- Chemcedine El Araichi - Győr - 2010
- Ayub - MTK - 2013–14
- Sofian Chakla - Videoton - 2014–15
- Daniane Jawad - Kaposvár - 2010–12
- Karim Loukili - Debrecen - 2022-
- Ryan Mmaee - Ferencváros - 2021-
- Samy Mmaee - Ferencváros - 2021-
- Youssef Sekour – Diósgyőr, Pápa – 2012–14

== Mozambique ==
- Genito – Honvéd - 2004–09
- Patricio Madzina - Honvéd - 2005
- Mano-Mano – Honvéd - 2004–06
- Marito - Honvéd - 2005–06
- Miró – Honvéd - 2005–06

== Netherlands ==
- Sjoerd Ars – Haladás – 2016–17
- Benito Belliot - Haladás - 1996
- Geoffrey Castillion – Debrecen, Puskás Akadémia - 2015–17
- Glenn Helder – MTK – 1999–00
- Julian Jenner – Ferencváros, Diósgyőr – 2012–15
- Mats Knoester - Ferencváros - 2022-
- Leonardo - Ferencváros - 2013–14
- Kees Luijckx - Videoton - 2015
- Kelvin Maynard - Kecskemét - 2011
- Mark Otten – Ferencváros – 2011–14
- Sjoerd Overgoor – Haladás – 2016–17
- Luciano Slagveer - Puskás Akadémia - 2020-
- Jos Smeets – Haladás – 1986
- Ferne Snoyl - Újpest - 2011
- Jack Tuijp - Ferencváros - 2013
- Arsenio Valpoort - Ferencváros - 2013–14
- Yoell van Nieff - Puskás Akadémia - 2019-

== New Zealand ==
- Kris Bright – Honvéd - 2011

== Niger ==
- Amadou Moutari – Ferencváros, Mezőkövesd, Honvéd, 2017–20

== Nigeria ==
- Tunde Adeniji - Debrecen - 2019–20
- David Abwo - Pápa - 2010
- Funsho Bamgboye - Haladás, MOL Fehérvár - 2017-
- Fortune Bassey - Ferencváros - 2022
- Ismaila Bisoye - Újpest - 2007
- Kasali Yinka Casal - Vasas - 2011
- Anderson Esiti - Ferencváros - 2022-
- Emeka Ezeugo – Honvéd - 1994
- Babatunde Fatusi – Pécs, Ferencváros - 1995–96
- Haruna Garba – Debrecen – 2019–20
- Ezekiel Henty - Videoton, Puskás Akadémia - 2017–19
- Augustine Igbinadolor – Veszprém – 1989
- Harmony Ikande –Honvéd - 2011
- Patrick Ikenne-King – Honvéd, MTK, Mezőkövesd – 2012–22
- Henry Isaac - Siófok - 2011
- Austin Izediunor - Vác - 1995–96
- Marshal Mfon Johnson – Honvéd – 2011–13
- Akeem Latifu – Honvéd – 2017
- Onyabor Monye - Újpest, Videoton - 1997–98; 2002–03
- Obinna Nwobodo - Újpest - 2017–20
- Henry Odia - Honvéd - 2012–13
- Godian Ofoegbu - Nagykanizsa - 1999–00
- Kim Ojo – Újpest – 2014–15
- Kingsley Ogbodo - Újpest - 2007
- Derick Ogbu – Debrecen – 2016–17
- Solomon Okoronkwo – Pécs – 2012–13
- Peter Olawale - Debrecen - 2022-
- Dudu Omagbemi - Debrecen, Kecskemét - 2008–10
- Vincent Onovo - Újpest - 2018-
- Eugène Salami – Debrecen, Kecskemét – 2011–13
- Theophilus Solomon - Újpest - 2019
- Meshack Ubochioma - Zalaegerszeg - 2021-
- Patrick Umoh – Újpest, Csepel – 1983; 1985

== North Macedonia ==
- Kemal Alomerović - Zalaegerszeg - 2008–09
- Viktor Angelov – Újpest – 2016–18
- David Babunski - Debrecen, Mezőkövesd, 2021-
- Dorian Babunski - Debrecen - 2022-
- Aleksandar Bajevski – Győr, Siófok, Ferencváros – 2003–06
- Enis Bardhi – Újpest – 2014–17
- Vladica Brdarovski - Győr - 2015
- Dančo Celeski - Nyíregyháza - 1998–00
- Matej Cvetanoski - Gyirmót - 2022
- Aleksandar Damchevski - Mezőkövesd - 2017
- Georgi Hristov - Debrecen - 2005–06
- Simeon Hristov - Eger - 2012
- Mario Ilievski - Kisvárda - 2022-
- Mirko Ivanovski – Videoton, Diósgyőr – 2015–16; 2019–21
- Nikola Jakimovski – Ferencváros – 2010
- Stefan Jevtoski - Újpest - 2021-
- Jasmin Mecinovikj - Eger, Pápa - 2012–14
- Mirsad Mijadinoski - Újpest, Debrecen - 2008–11
- Daniel Milovanovikj - Zalaegerszeg - 2021-
- Bojan Miovski - MTK - 2020–22
- Visar Musliu - MOL Fehérvár - 2019–22
- Boban Nikolov - MOL Fehérvár - 2018–21
- Kire Ristevski – Vasas, Újpest – 2016–21
- Remzifaik Selmani - Újpest, Mezőkövesd - 2017–18; 2022-
- Nikola Serafimov - Zalaegerszeg, MOL Fehérvár - 2021-
- Stefan Spirovski - Ferencváros, MTK - 2017–19; 2022
- Aco Stojkov - Debrecen, Nyíregyháza - 2007–09

== Northern Ireland ==
- Tommy Doherty – Ferencváros – 2010

== Norway ==
- Liban Abdi – Ferencváros – 2009–12
- Tokmac Nguen – Ferencváros – 2019-
- Kristoffer Zachariassen - Ferencváros - 2021-

== Pakistan ==
- Adnan Ahmed – Ferencváros – 2009–10

== Palestine ==
- Imad Zatara - Zalaegerszeg - 2008

== Panama ==
- Azmahar Ariano - Honvéd - 2014
- Aníbal Godoy – Honvéd – 2013–15

== Paraguay ==
- Gonzalo Cardozo - Diósgyőr - 2008
- Óscar Velázquez - Vasas - 2010

== Poland ==
- Wojciech Golla - Puskás Akadémia - 2023–
- Lukas Klemenz - Honvéd - 2021–23
- Rafał Makowski - Kisvárda - 2022–24
- Michał Nalepa - Ferencváros - 2014–17
- Damian Rasak - Újpest - 2024–
- Mariusz Unierzyski - Vasas - 2006–09
- Robert Warzycha - Pécs, Honvéd - 1994–96

== Portugal ==
- Marco Caneira – Videoton – 2011–15
- Mauro Cerqueira - Újpest - 2020–21
- Tiago Ferreira – MTK – 2020–22
- Vítor Gomes - Videoton - 2013–14
- Jucie Lupeta - Videoton - 2013–14
- João Nunes - Puskás Akadémia - 2020–22
- Filipe Oliveira – Videoton – 2011–16
- Rui Pedro – Ferencváros, Haladás, Diósgyőr, Mezőkövesd – 2017–21
- Rúben Pinto - MOL Fehérvár - 2020-
- André Portulez - Kaposvár - 2011
- Hugo Seco - Kisvárda - 2019–20
- Sandro Semedo - Zalaegerszeg - 2020–21

== Romania ==
- András Ábrahám - Haladás - 1994
- Sebastian Achim – Gyirmót – 2016–17
- Lucian Anania – BVSC – 1993–94
- Bogdan Andone – Ferencváros – 2002–2003
- Alexandru Andraşi – Vác – 1995–2000
- Cătălin Anghel – BVSC – 1998–99
- Bogdan Apostu – Nyíregyháza, Diósgyőr – 2008–09
- Catalin Azoitei - Pécs, Csepel, Győr, Honvéd, Nyíregyháza, Nagykanizsa - 1993–00
- Danut Bába - BVSC - 1994
- Valeriu Balaci - Haladás - 2004
- Cristian Balaj – Pécs – 1992–93
- Dumitru Balea – Győr – 1997
- Dorel Balint – Honvéd – 2001–04
- Alexandru Băluță – Puskás Akadémia – 2020–
- Gheorghe Banica – Tatabánya – 1991–92
- Florin Bătrânu – Honvéd – 2002
- István Berde - Győr - 2009–10
- Nelu Bessermann - Tiszakécske - 1997–98
- Ciprian Binder – Győr, Diósgyőr – 2004–07
- Béla Bíró - Győr, Gázszer, Videoton - 1990–91; 1994–95; 1999, 2001
- Imre Bíró – Győr – 1990–91
- Virgiliu Bocan – Stadler – 1998
- István Bódis - Balmazújváros - 2017
- Ion Bogdan – MTK – 1946–47
- Liviu Bonchis – Haladás, Zalaegerszeg – 1996–02
- Csaba Borbély - Haladás, Ferencváros - 1999–00; 2005
- Sorin Botiş – Ferencváros, Zalaegerszeg, Honvéd – 2003–12
- Laurențiu Brănescu – Haladás – 2015
- Aurel Brindas - Pécs - 1996–97
- Dan Bucșa – Győr – 2015
- Vlad Bujor – Zalaegerszeg – 2011
- Relu Buliga – Debrecen, Diósgyőr – 1994; 1997–99
- Dionisiu Bumb – Pécs – 1995–96
- Claudiu Bumba – Kisvárda, MOL Fehérvár – 2019-
- Lucian Burchel – Nyíregyháza – 1993
- Andreias Calcan - Újpest, Mezőkövesd - 2020; 2021–22
- Florin Calin – Honvéd – 1998
- Cornel Casoltan – Zalaegerszeg, Debrecen – 1997–99
- Marius Cheregi – Videoton, Ferencváros – 2000–2002
- Petru Chiratcu – Győr, Sopron – 1991; 1993–95
- Cristian Cigan – Sopron – 2005–07
- Sorin Cigan – Szeged, Újpest, Ferencváros, Vasas, Stadler – 1991–94
- Marcel Cimpian - Tiszakécske - 1997
- Lucian Ciocan - Békéscsaba - 1994
- Dan Colesniuc - Újpest - 1991
- Dan Constantinescu - Honvéd - 2016
- Marius Corbu – Puskás Akadémia – 2020–
- Claudiu Cornaci – Nyíregyháza, Szolnok – 2007–10
- Constantin Cornel - Debrecen - 1999
- Andrei Coroian – Kaposvár, Pápa – 2013–14
- Alexandru Costisor - Sopron - 2005–06
- Alin Coțan – Sopron – 2005–06
- István Cseke - Honvéd, Győr - 1995–98
- Alexandru Darha - Videoton - 1994
- Ionut Daria - Sopron - 2006
- Ciprian Dianu – Diósgyőr, Zalaegerszeg – 2005; 2007
- Francisc Dican – Nyíregyháza – 1999–2000
- Mihai Dina – Győr – 2012
- Marian Dinu - Haladás - 1999
- Benone Dohot – Diósgyőr – 1992–93
- Ciprian Dorobantu – Pécs – 1994
- Alin Dragan – MTK – 2002–03
- Alexandru Dragomir - Sopron - 2007
- Cristian Dulca – Honvéd – 2002
- Adrian Dulcea – Győr – 2001
- Gheorghe Dumitrașcu – Győr – 1996
- Cornel Ene – Kisvárda, Gyirmót – 2018–22
- Carlo Erdei - Balmazújváros - 2017–18
- Iuliu Farkaș – Ferencváros, Kolozsvár – 1943–44
- Ioan Filip – Debrecen – 2016–19
- Dragoș Firțulescu – Kaposvár – 2014
- Andrei Florean – Kaposvár, Pápa – 2014–15
- Danut Frunza – Diósgyőr, Újpest – 1999–00; 2001–02
- István Fülöp - Diósgyőr - 2017
- Lóránd Fülöp – Puskás Akadémia – 2019
- Romulus Gabor – Diósgyőr– 1991–92
- Alexandru Gaica - Debrecen - 1995
- Adrian Găman – Siófok – 2008
- Remus Ganea – Diósgyőr – 1999–00
- Attila Ghinda - Honvéd - 1995–96
- Cosmin Giura – Sopron – 2007–08
- Sabin-Cosmin Goia – Nyíregyháza, Pécs – 2008–09; 2011–12
- Liviu Goian – Debrecen – 1993–00
- Decebal Gradinariu – Nyíregyháza – 1998–99
- Gheorghe Grozav – Kisvárda, Diósgyőr, MTK - 2019–22
- Radu Gușatu – MTK – 2000
- Otto Hindrich - Kisvárda - 2022-
- Sergiu Homei – Sopron – 2006–07
- Răzvan Horj – Újpest – 2018–19
- Sebastian Ianc - Sopron - 2006
- Ion Ibric – Sopron – 2005–07
- Daniel Iftodi – Győr – 1995
- Nicolae Ilea – Debrecen, MTK, Videoton – 1994–00
- Sabin Ilie – Debrecen – 2003
- Radu Ion - Debrecen - 1993
- Andrei Ionescu – Ferencváros – 2012–14
- Lóránt Kovács – Haladás, Újpest – 2016–20
- Ilie Lazar – Győr – 1996; 1998–99
- Ovidiu Lazăr – Honvéd – 1992
- Filip Lăzăreanu – Nyíregyháza, Kecskemét – 2007–10
- Cătălin Liță – MTK – 2003
- Cristian Luca - Sopron - 2005
- Marius Luca – Békéscsaba – 1995
- Ștefan Mardare – Debrecen – 2011
- Gheorghe Marginean – Debrecen – 1990–91
- Sorin Marginean – Haladás – 1999–00
- Adrian Mărkuș - Kaposvár - 2013
- Valentin Miculescu – Békéscsaba – 2003–05
- Darius Milcea – Pápa – 2005
- Mihai Mincă – Kisvárda – 2018–21
- Simion Mironaş – Békéscsaba – 1994
- Sergiu Moga – Honvéd – 2011–12
- Tibor Moldovan - Nyíregyháza, Újpest - 2007–08
- Levente Molnár - Győr, Honvéd, Sopron - 1997–04
- Cristian Munteanu – Sopron – 2005–07
- Dorel Mutică – Pápa – 2005
- Zsolt Muzsnay – Videoton – 1990–91; 1992–93; 1995
- Sándor Nagy - MTK, Diósgyőr, Nyíregyháza - 1993–94; 1997–01
- Mario Nedelea - Tiszakécske - 1998
- Eugen Neagoe – Vasas, Ferencváros – 1994–95
- Adrian Negrău – Honvéd, BVSC, Haladás – 1991–98
- Sergiu Negruț – Kisvárda – 2018–19
- Mihai Nicorec – Győr, Zalaegerszeg, Mezőkövesd – 2009–10; 2012–13; 2016
- Gheorghe Nițu – BVSC – 1995
- Dănuț Oprea – Győr – 1996
- Caruso Palacian - Csepel - 1993
- Raul Palmeș - Honvéd - 2016
- Claudiu Pascariu – Honvéd – 2013
- Florin Pelecaci – Diósgyőr – 2007–09
- Gheorghe Pena – Győr, Csepel, Honvéd – 1992–96
- Szabolcs Perenyi - Nyíregyháza - 2007–09
- Ion Petcu – Diósgyőr – 1991–92
- Andrei Peteleu - Kisvárda - 2021-
- Iulian Petrache – Kaposvár – 2013–14
- László Polgár - Videoton - 1991–92
- Marian Popa – BVSC – 1997
- Grigore Popan - Nyíregyháza - 2004
- Lucian Popescu – Győr – 1994–95
- Pavel Popovits - Gázszer, Pécs - 1999–00
- Wilhelm Possak – Bástya Szegedi, Újpest, Vasas – 1928–32
- Florian Radu – Szentlőrinc – 1948
- Marius Radu - Sopron - 2006–07
- Sorin Radu – Diósgyőr – 1999–00
- Emil Raducu - Debrecen - 1993
- Florin Raducu – Békéscsaba – 1996–98
- Mircea Raican - Diósgyőr - 1999–00
- Daniel Rednic – MTK – 2002–04
- Ciprian Rosca - Stadler, Haladás - 1998–00
- Ion Roșu – Újpest – 1993
- Robert Roszel - Diósgyőr - 2010
- Adrián Rus – Balmazújváros, MOL Fehérvár – 2017–18; 2019–22
- Laurențiu Rus – FC Sopron – 2006–07
- Radu Sabo – Debrecen, Zalaegerszeg – 1998–05
- Claudiu Salagean – Győr, Sopron – 1996–02
- Marius Sasu – Honvéd, Ferencváros – 2001–05
- Marius Sava - Nyíregyháza - 2007
- Marian Savu – Videoton – 2003–04
- Toma Sedecaru – Nyíregyháza – 1992–93
- Tibor Selymes – Haladás, Debrecen – 2002–04
- Nicolae Simatoc – Nagyvárad – 1942–43
- Marius Siminic - Diósgyőr - 2005–06
- Viorel Stancu - Békéscsaba - 1995
- Constantin Stănici – BVSC – 1996–97
- Flavius Sterean - Haladás - 1999
- Florin Stoica - Békéscsaba - 1997–98
- Dan Stupar – Debrecen – 1996–98
- Alexandru Suciu – Siófok – 1992
- Marius Șumudică – Debrecen – 2002–03
- Anatolis Sundas - Honvéd - 2014
- Csaba Szántó - Győr, Sopron - 1990–94
- Béla Székely - Videoton - 1990
- Loránd Szilágyi - Honvéd - 2015–16
- Sándor Szűcs - Debrecen - 1989–91
- Nándor Tamás – Puskás Akadémia – 2019–20
- Ferenc Ternován - Diósgyőr - 1997–99
- Gyula Tikosi - MTK, Sopron, Csepel - 1994–96
- Dorel Toderas – Debrecen – 1990–91; 1994
- Árpád Tordai - MOL Fehérvár, Mezőkövesd - 2021-
- Daniel Tudor – Videoton – 2003–06
- Gheorghe Tulba – Debrecen – 1990
- Lucian Ulici - Békéscsaba - 1996
- Rémusz Unchiás - Békéscsaba - 1996
- Daniel Usvat – Haladás, BVSC, Videoton, Siófok, Pápa – 1996–99; 2000–04
- Nistor Văidean – Győr – 1990–91
- Viorel Vancea – Videoton, Honvéd, Békéscsaba, Vasas, BVSC – 1990–91; 1992–95
- Constantin Varga – Győr – 1994
- Ioan Varga – Újpest – 1991
- Adrian Văsâi – Nyíregyháza – 1992
- Szilárd Vereș - Gyirmót - 2017
- Sorin Vlaicu – Békéscsaba – 1994–95
- Gabriel Vochin – Videoton – 2003–04
- Ion Voicu – Fehérvár – 2003–05
- Ion Zare – Siófok, Pécs – 1990–94
- Ladislau Zilahi – Nagyvárad – 1943–46
- Ervin Zsiga – Balmazújváros, Kaposvár – 2017–18; 2019–20

== Russia ==
- Guram Adzhoyev - Diósgyőr - 1992–93
- Aleksandr Alumona - Videoton - 2004–06
- Aleksandr Dozmorov - Vasas - 1990–92
- Vyacheslav Eremeev - Stadler, Dunaferr, Szeged, Tatabánya -1995-01
- Sergey Kuznetsov - Ferencváros - 1991–96
- Irakli Kvekveskiri - Pécs - 2012
- Valeriy Linnikov - Stadler - 1994–95
- Sergei Pervushin - Siófok - 1993
- Serder Serderov - Mezőkövesd - 2020–21
- Albert Tsarayev - Siófok - 1996–97
- Sandro Tsveiba – Újpest – 2014–15

== Rwanda ==
- Abass Rassou - Diósgyőr - 2007

== Scotland ==
- Mark Millar - Újpest - 2009–10

== Senegal ==
- Bebeto - Kaposvár, Kecskemét, Gyirmót - 2012; 2014–15; 2017
- Mbaye Diagne - Újpest - 2015
- Issaga Diallo - Kaposvár - 2014
- Abass Dieng – Honvéd – 2007–12
- Matar Dieye - Debrecen - 2022-
- El Hadji Diouf - Haladás - 2010
- Christian Gomis - Honvéd - 2022-
- Mansour Kane - Honvéd - 1999
- Paul Keita - Mezőkövesd - 2017–18
- Jean Adrien Sagna - Vasas - 2008
- Lansana Sagna - Újpest - 2014
- Mouhamadou Seye – Pápa – 2012; 2015
- El Hadji Badiane Sidibé - Újpest - 2014
- Ibrahima Sidibe – Debrecen – 2005–08; 2012–16
- Souleymane Tandia - Honvéd - 2012–14
- Khaly Thiam - Kaposvár, MTK - 2012–16

== Serbia ==
- Miloš Adamović - Vasas - 2015–16
- Aleksandar Alempijević – Kecskemét, Ferencváros – 2008–13
- Marko Anđić - Videoton - 2008–11
- Nemanja Andrić – Győr, Újpest, Balmazújváros - 2012–18
- Attila Andruskó - Kaposvár, Siófok - 2004–06; 2009
- Dragan Antanasijević - Kaposvár - 2010
- Filip Antonijević - MTK - 2021
- Nemanja Antonov - Újpest - 2020-
- Goran Arnaut - Vasas - 2010–11
- Nemanja Arsenijević - Honvéd - 2008–09
- Lazar Arsić – Vasas, Pápa – 2012–14
- Đorđe Babalj - Zalaegerszeg - 2007
- Djordje Bajic - BVSC - 1998–99
- Vojislav Bakrač - Tatabánya - 2006–07
- Marko Basara - Siófok - 2008–09
- Budimir Bašić - Szeged - 1999
- Danilo Belić - Sopron - 2007
- Miroslav Bjeloš - Újpest - 2020-
- Igor Bogdanović - Debrecen, Honvéd, Győr, Nyíregyháza, Haladás - 2004–10
- Milan Bogunović - Zalaegerszeg, Diósgyőr, Pápa - 2006; 2009–12; 2014–15
- Saša Bogunović - Zalaegerszeg - 2006
- Mladen Brkić – Zalaegerszeg – 2012
- Dušan Brković – Debrecen, Diósgyőr – 2013–17; 2018–20
- Vladimir Buač - Eger - 2013
- Branislav Bulatović - Nagykanizsa, Siófok - 1995–96
- Radoš Bulatović - Zalaegerszeg - 2011
- Vladimir Ćirić - Diósgyőr - 2000
- Lazar Ćirković - Kisvárda, Budapest Honvéd - 2021-
- Milan Čokić - Siófok - 2012
- Nebojša Ćorović - Videoton - 1996
- Božidar Ćosić - Debrecen - 2009
- Dragan Crnomarković - Nagykanizsa, Ferencváros - 1999–00
- Vladan Čukić – Kecskemét, Ferencváros – 2008–09; 2010–17
- Dejan Čupić - Debrecen - 1997
- Slavko Damjanović - Békéscsaba - 2015–16
- Branislav Danilović – Puskás Akadémia, Videoton, Debrecen, Diósgyőr - 2014–21
- Milan Davidov - Zalaegerszeg, Nyíregyháza - 2007–08; 2010
- Stefan Deak - Siófok, Honvéd - 2012–13; 2017
- Srđan Dimitrov - MTK - 2020–22
- Petar Divić - Vasas - 2008–10
- Marko Dmitrović – Újpest – 2013–15
- Saša Dobrić - Vasas, Eger - 2008–10; 2012–13
- Dušan Đokić - Vác - 2007
- Goran Đorđević - Újpest - 1995–96
- Vladimir Đorđević - Győr - 2009–14
- Marko Đorović - Zalaegerszeg - 2005–06
- Aleksandar Djurasović - BVSC - 1996
- Dejan Dražić - Honvéd - 2022
- Stefan Dražić - Mezőkövesd, Diósgyőr - 2018–19; 2020-
- Dragan Drljača - Békéscsaba - 1994
- Jovan Drobnjak - Dunaferr, Honvéd, Békéscsaba - 2002–05
- Ivan Dudić - Zalaegerszeg, Újpest - 2007–10
- Josip Dulić - Videoton, Gázszer - 1996–99
- Zoran Đurišić - Debrecen, Videoton - 1997–98
- Emir Džinović - BVSC - 1993–94
- Daniel Farkaš - Mezőkövesd - 2017–22
- Nenad Filipović - Videoton, MTK - 2009–10
- Vladan Filipović - Békéscsaba, Videoton, Diósgyőr - 1995–96; 1999–00
- Ivica Francišković - Zalaegerszeg - 2005–07
- Željko Gavrić - Ferencváros - 2021-
- Dejan Georgijević - Ferencváros - 2018
- Petar Gigić - Újpest - 2020
- Dragan Gošić - Szolnok - 2011
- Goran Grkinić - Kecskemét - 2008–09
- Nikola Grubješić - Dunaújváros - 2015
- Duško Grujić - Békéscsaba - 2002–05
- Miroslav Grumić – Kaposvár, Pécs, Diósgyőr, Haladás, Zalaegerszeg – 2011–16; 2017–19
- Aleksandar Ignjatović - Honvéd - 2012–16
- Brana Ilić - Kisvárda - 2018–19
- Stevan Jakoba - Haladás - 1999
- Miloš Janić - Békéscsaba, Nyíregyháza - 1997–98
- Ivan Janjic - MTK, Zalaegerszeg, Vasas - 2003–06
- Radivoje Jevdjović - Pécs - 2006
- Goran Jevtić - Debrecen - 1997
- Goran Jezdimirović - MTK, Tatabánya - 2000–06
- Đorđe Jocić - Pécs - 2013–14
- Miloš Jokić - Szolnok, Vasas - 2011–12
- Dejan Joksimović - Haladás - 1999
- Aleksandar Jovanović - Ferencváros, Debrecen - 2011–19
- Goran Jovanović - Győr - 2002–03
- Mirko Jovanović - Honvéd, Haladás - 1995–99
- Aleksandar Jović – Ferencváros - 2001–03
- Dejan Karan – Kecskemét, Diósgyőr – 2013–15; 2016–21
- Miloš Kocić - Győr - 2015
- Miloš Kolaković - Debrecen - 2005
- Goran Kolarić - Pécs - 2000
- Mišo Koljenović - MTK - 2006
- Goran Kopunović - Ferencváros, Újpest - 1994–96; 1998–00
- Velibor Kopunović - Vác, Újpest - 1998–99; 2007
- Jevrem Kosnić - Honvéd - 2014–15
- Srdjan Kostić - Haladás - 1999
- Zoran Kostić - Diósgyőr, Nyíregyháza - 2013–15
- Željko Kovačević - Nyíregyháza - 2010
- Miloš Krstić - Diósgyőr - 2015
- Zoltan Kujundžić - Videoton - 1996
- Zoran Kuntić - Videoton, Ferencváros, Vasas - 1995–96; 1997–98
- Ognjen Lakić - Siófok - 2007
- Mladen Lambulić - MTK, Sopron, Újpest, Kecskemét - 2002–10
- Bojan Lazić - MTK, Sopron, Ferencváros - 2001–06
- Danko Lazović – Videoton – 2016–18
- Ognjen Lekić - Sopron - 2006
- Matija Ljujić - Újpest - 2022-
- Nenad Lukić - Honvéd - 2021-
- Novica Maksimović - Pápa - 2013
- Bojan Mamić – Ferencváros – 2009–10
- Goran Marić - Pápa - 2010–14
- Radovan Marić – Vasas – 1988
- Dejan Marinković - Nagykanizsa - 1999
- Lazar Marjanović – Diósgyőr – 2014–15
- Miljan Marković - Szeged - 1999
- Nenad Marković - Szeged - 1999
- Radovan Marković - Győr - 1999–00
- Saša Marković - Nyíregyháza - 1999
- Saša Marković - MTK - 2002
- Slobodan Marković - Kaposvár - 2009
- Vanja Marković - Kaposvár - 2019
- Marko Marović - Pécs - 2011–12
- Momčilo Medić – Veszprém – 1989
- Branko Mihajlović - Diósgyőr - 2018–20
- Dušan Mileusnić - Vasas - 2010–12
- Boris Miličić - Diósgyőr, Szolnok - 2008–11
- Zoran Milinković - Honvéd - 1994
- Dejan Milovanović - Ferencváros, Dunaferr - 1995–99
- Luka Milunović - Debrecen - 2020
- Vuk Mitošević - Kisvárda - 2018
- Nikola Mitrović – Újpest, Videoton, Zalaegerszeg, Honvéd – 2010–13; 2019-
- Djordje Mrdjanin - Vasas - 2009
- Petar Mudreša - Kaposvár - 2011–12
- Bojan Neziri - Győr - 2007
- Đorđe Nikolić - Újpest - 2022-
- Marko Nikolić - Budafok, Debrecen - 2020–22
- Nenad Nikolić - Vasas - 2008–09
- Uroš Nikolić – Videoton, Puskás Akadémia – 2012–13
- Nenad Novaković – Debrecen – 2011–16
- Nemanja Obradović - Kisvárda - 2020
- Nemanja Obrić - Kaposvár, Haladás - 2008–10
- Dražen Okuka - Kaposvár, Diósgyőr, MTK - 2010–17
- Filip Pajović - Videoton, Puskás Akadémia, Újpest - 2015–16; 2017-
- Tomislav Pajović - Vasas - 2015
- Dušan Pantelić - Honvéd - 2021–22
- Aleksandar Pantic - Siófok, Videoton - 2002–04
- Danilo Pantić - MOL Fehérvár - 2019
- Đorđe Pantić - Debrecen - 2009
- Ognjen Paripovic - Vasas - 2008–09
- Branko Pauljević – Pécs, Puskás Akadémia, Mezőkövesd, Újpest - 2015-
- Čedomir Pavičević - Pécs, Vasas, Eger - 2003–11; 2012–13
- Dušan Pavlov - Eger - 2012–13
- Bojan Pavlović - Kaposvár - 2010–14
- Danilo Pejović - Kecskemét - 2022-
- Milan Perić – Kaposvár, Videoton, Ferencváros, Pécs, Dunaújváros – 2010–14
- Marko Petković - Honvéd - 2022
- Vladimir Petrić - Videoton - 1999
- Stojan Pilipović - Kecskemét - 2014
- Predrag Počuča - Sopron - 2007
- Saša Popin - Pápa, Haladás - 2014–16
- Igor Popović - Siófok - 2008
- Ivan Popović - Újpest - 2005
- Nenad Pozder - Diósgyőr - 1999–00
- Josip Projić - Honvéd - 2015
- Radoš Protić - Kisvárda - 2018–20
- Antal Puhalak - Honvéd, Videoton - 1994–95
- Bratislav Punoševac - Honvéd, Békéscsaba - 2015–16
- Dragan Puškaš - Csepel, Békéscsaba, Gázszer, Videoton, Pécs - 1994–98; 2000
- Siniša Radanović - Kecskemét - 2011
- Žolt Radić - Kaposvár - 2006
- Stefan Radoja - Kecskemét - 2015
- Aleksandar Radosavljević - Győr - 2010–11
- Zoran Radulović - Vasas - 2007
- Nenad Rajić – Diósgyőr – 2013–15
- Slobodan Rajković - MTK - 2022
- Savo Raković - Diósgyőr, Eger - 2011–13
- Aleksandar Ranđelović - Pápa - 2015
- Ivan Ristić - Videoton - 2002–04
- Radojica Ristic - Kecskemét - 2009
- Emil Rockov - MOL Fehérvár - 2020-
- Vladan Savić - Kecskemét - 2008–15
- Marko Šćepović - Videoton - 2016–19
- Stefan Šćepović - Videoton - 2018–19
- Danilo Sekulić – Debrecen – 2016–17
- Djordje Simić - Diósgyőr - 2009
- Dušan Šimić - Békéscsaba - 2004–05
- Slobodan Simović - Kisvárda - 2020-
- Nebojša Skopljak - Kecskemét - 2015
- Darko Spalević - Zalaegerszeg - 2005
- Bojan Spasojević - Zalaegerszeg - 2005
- Mirsad Sprečak – Videoton, Siófok, Veszprém – 1989–91; 1993
- Dejan Srdić - Debrecen - 1996
- Zoran Stamenić - Honvéd - 2004
- Srđan Stanić - Diósgyőr, Kaposvár, Ferencváros - 2008–11
- Aleksandar Stanisavljević - Zalaegerszeg - 2011
- Filip Stanisavljević – Újpest – 2012–15
- Lazar Stanišić - Győr - 2009–15
- Saša Stevanović - Győr - 2004–14
- Nenad Stojaković - Honvéd - 2008–09
- Aleksandar Stoimirović - Pécs - 2012
- Zoran Šupić - Győr, Diósgyőr, Pápa - 2007–11; 2013
- Aleksandar Tanasin - Zalaegerszeg - 2020–21
- Mirko Tintar – Videoton – 1989–90
- Mirko Todorović - Békéscsaba - 1996–97
- Nenad Todorović - Zalaegerszeg, Pécs - 2009–10; 2011–12
- Nikola Trajković - Győr - 2010–15
- Dane Trbović - Diósgyőr - 2008
- Bojan Trkulja - Sopron - 2006
- Milutin Trnavac - Zalaegerszeg - 2008
- Aleksandar Trninić - Debrecen - 2013
- Nikola Trujić - Debrecen - 2019–20
- Djordje Tutoric – Ferencváros - 2010–11
- Vojo Ubiparip - Vasas - 2015
- Dušan Vasiljević – Békéscsaba, Kaposvár, Újpest, Videoton, Honvéd – 2004–07; 2010–17
- Ljubisa Vasiljevic - Veszprém, Vasas - 1993–94
- Lazar Veselinović - Mezőkövesd - 2017
- Boris Vidaković - Tiszakécske - 1997–98
- Nebojša Vignjević - Tatabánya - 2001
- Dejan Vilotić - Videoton, Békéscsaba - 2000–05
- Despot Višković - Diósgyőr - 2007
- Đorđe Vlajić - Győr - 2004
- Draško Vojinović - Diósgyőr, Nyíregyháza - 2008–10
- Miloš Vranjanin - Kisvárda - 2022-
- Mićo Vranješ - Pécs - 2004
- Goran Vujić - Pécs - 2006
- Dejan Vukadinović - Nyíregyháza, Diósgyőr, MTK - 2007–08; 2009–11
- Milonja Vukadinović - Haladás - 1994
- Ljubiša Vukelja - Vasas - 2009
- Dragan Vukmir – Ferencváros, Debrecen, Honvéd, MTK – 2002–08; 2009–17
- Branislav Vukomanović – Szolnok – 2011
- Boris Živanović - Honvéd, Nyíregyháza - 2012–14
- Lazar Zličić - Kisvárda - 2020–22

== Sierra Leone ==
- Alfi Conteh-Lacalle – Nyíregyháza, Honvéd - 2010

== Slovakia ==
- Robert Barborik - Pécs - 1993
- Miroslav Bedi - Siófok - 1999–00
- László Bénes - Győr - 2014
- Mário Bicák - Győr - 2008–09
- Martin Bielik - Vasas - 2008
- Jakub Brašeň - Mezőkövesd - 2017–18
- Roman Bujdák - Pécs - 1995–96
- Jaroslav Cellár - Győr - 2015
- Martin Chrien - Mezőkövesd - 2021–22
- Erik Čikoš - Debrecen - 2018–19
- Ondrej Daňko - Csepel - 1995
- Ondrej Debnár - Sopron - 2004
- Juraj Dovičovič - Zalaegerszeg - 2007
- Pavol Ďurica - Videoton - 2008
- Peter Fieber - Honvéd - 2011
- Branislav Fodrek - Haladás - 2010–11
- Jozef Gašpar - Diósgyőr, Vasas - 2005; 2009–11
- András Gasparik - Vác - 2000
- Gergely Geri - Nyíregyháza - 2005
- Árpád Gögh - Győr, Gázszer - 1997–99; 2002
- Marián Had - Győr - 2013–14
- Ľuboš Hajdúch - Kaposvár, Puskás Akadémia - 2011–15
- Juraj Halenár - Nyíregyháza - 2015
- Michal Hanek – Diósgyőr – 2012–14
- Zoltán Harsányi - Pécs, Mezőkövesd, Puskás Akadémia, Balmazújváros - 2012–15; 2018
- Marcel Horký - Honvéd - 2004
- Dávid Hudák – Újpest, Mezőkövesd – 2015; 2016–18
- Luboš Ilizi - Vasas, Békéscsaba - 2011–12; 2015
- Martin Juhar - Diósgyőr - 2018–19
- Andrej Kadlec - MTK - 2022
- Ľuboš Kamenár - Győr, Vasas - 2013–15; 2017–18
- Petr Kašpar - Újpest - 1991–92
- Attila Király - Vác - 2000
- Vojtech Kiss - Tatabánya - 2001
- Kristián Kolčák - Gyirmót, Haladás - 2017–19
- Kamil Kopúnek - Haladás - 2014
- Tomáš Košický - Debrecen - 2018–20; 2021-
- Marek Kostoláni - Honvéd - 2011
- Tomáš Košút - Honvéd - 2018
- Miroslav Kozák - Tatabánya - 2007
- Ladislav Kozmér - Zalaegerszeg, Kaposvár - 2004–06
- Radoslav Kráľ - Zalaegerszeg - 2002–04
- Richard Križan - Puskás Akadémia - 2019
- František Kunzo - Diósgyőr, Újpest, Videoton, Vác - 1999–03; 2006
- Mátyás Lelkes - Kaposvár - 2010
- András Lénárt - Győr - 2015
- Martin Lipčák - Zalaegerszeg - 2007
- Viliam Macko - Honvéd - 2009–10
- Tomáš Majtán - Mezőkövesd - 2017–18
- Róbert Mak - Ferencváros - 2020–22
- Péter Medgyes - Pécs, Csepel - 1991–96
- Tomáš Medveď - Videoton, Pápa - 2003–05
- Alexander Mészáros - Csepel - 1996–97
- Karol Mészáros – Puskás Akadémia, Debrecen, Haladás, Újpest – 2016–19
- Attila Miklós - Videoton - 1997–98
- Péter Mikóczi - Haladás - 1995–96
- Patrik Mišák - Mezőkövesd - 2018
- Juraj Molnár - Vác - 1993
- Péter Molnár - Győr, Siófok, Paks - 2009–11; 2013–17
- Jozef Muzlay - Sopron - 2004
- Krisztián Németh - Tatabánya - 2005
- Július Nôta - Diósgyőr, Zalaegerszeg, Honvéd, Vasas - 1997–02
- Ján Novota - Debrecen - 2017
- Milan Pastva - Tatabánya, Honvéd - 2007; 2009
- Matúš Paukner - Békéscsaba - 2016
- Marek Penksa - Ferencváros - 2002–05
- Róbert Pillár - Mezőkövesd - 2017-
- Attila Pinte - Ferencváros - 2000–02
- Patrik Pinte - Haladás - 2017–18
- Peter Polgár - Zalaegerszeg - 2007–08
- Peter Pokorný - MOL Fehérvár - 2022-
- Marian Postrk - Tatabánya - 2006–07
- Roland Praj - Újpest - 1993–95
- Dávid Radványi - Vasas - 2011
- Róbert Rák - Diósgyőr - 1997
- Richárd Rubint - Békéscsaba, Diósgyőr - 2004; 2006–07
- Ladislav Rybánsky - Kecskemét, Siófok, Diósgyőr - 2010–13
- Kornel Saláta - Haladás - 2019
- Attila Sánta - Siófok - 2000
- Jakub Sedláček - Újpest - 2020
- Tomáš Sedlák - Kaposvár - 2012
- Stanislav Šesták - Ferencváros - 2015–16
- Vladimir Siago - Vác - 1995–96
- Branislav Sluka - MTK - 2022
- Marián Sluka - Zalaegerszeg, Siófok, Haladás, Pápa - 2008–12; 2014–15
- Michal Škvarka - Ferencváros - 2019–21
- Zoltán Sováb - Vác - 2000
- Simeon Stevica - Pápa - 2004–06
- Peter Struhár - Nyíregyháza, Pápa - 2010; 2013–14
- Peter Šulek - Mezőkövesd - 2017
- Martin Svintek - Vác - 2006
- Otto Szabó - MTK, Sopron, Debrecen, Vasas, Győr, Pápa - 2003–06; 2009–13
- Ákos Szarka – Diósgyőr, Gyirmót – 2017–18
- János Szépe - Zalaegerszeg, Mezőkövesd, MTK - 2019–22
- Marian Timko - Diósgyőr - 2000
- Rudolf Urban - Győr - 2007
- Jozef Urblík - Puskás Akadémia - 2018-
- Stanislav Velický - Mezőkövesd - 2014
- Denis Ventúra - Gyirmót - 2022
- Róbert Vittek - Debrecen - 2016
- Ján Vlasko - Puskás Akadémia - 2018–20
- Jakub Vojtuš - Mezőkövesd - 2020–21
- Robert Weber - Győr - 1994
- Igor Žofčák - Nyíregyháza - 2015

== Slovenia ==
- Jože Benko – Pápa – 2012
- Klemen Bingo - Zalaegerszeg - 2006
- Miha Blažič – Ferencváros – 2017–22
- Darko Brljak – Eger – 2012–13
- Gregor Bunc - Zalaegerszeg - 1999–00
- Timotej Dodlek - Dunaújváros - 2014–15
- Safet Jahič – Zalaegerszeg, Kaposvár, Dunaújváros – 2011–12; 2014–15
- Adem Kapič – Ferencváros, Vasas - 2001–06
- Denis Klinar - Puskás Akadémia - 2018
- Aleš Kokot - Kecskemét - 2010
- Rok Kronaveter – Győr – 2012–14
- Rene Mihelič - Debrecen - 2014–15
- Matej Miljatovic - Zalaegerszeg - 2007–10
- Stanislav Sestak – Ferencváros – 2016–17
- Leon Panikvar – Zalaegerszeg, Pécs – 2009–12
- Damir Pekič - Zalaegerszeg - 2007–09
- Matej Poplatnik - Kaposvár - 2019
- Milan Rakič - Kecskemét - 2009
- Marko Ranilović – Ferencváros, Kaposvár – 2010–14
- Admir Suljic - Kaposvár - 2006–08
- Dejan Trajkovski - Puskás Akadémia - 2018–19
- Uroš Veselič - Kecskemét - 2009–10
- Dalibor Volaš - Debrecen - 2013–15
- Zoran Zeljković - Pécs - 2011–13
- Žiga Živko - Zalaegerszeg - 2020

== Somalia ==
- Ayub Daud – Honvéd – 2013–15

== South Africa ==
- Johnson Naeem - III. Kerület - 1998
- MacBeth Sibaya - III. Kerület - 1998
- Lafe Vittitoe - III. Kerület - 1998

== South Korea ==
- Kim Ho-Young – Diósgyőr – 2014–15
- Lee Do-kweon - Újpest - 2007
- Ryu Seung-woo – Ferencváros – 2016–17
- Suk Hyun-jun - Debrecen - 2017

== Spain ==
- Carlos Alcántara – Ferencváros – 2009–10
- Chema Antón – Újpest – 2012–14
- Álvaro Brachi – Videoton – 2011–15
- Juan Calatayud - Videoton - 2013–15
- Ezequiel Calvente – Békéscsaba, Haladás, Debrecen – 2015–18
- Enrique Carreño – Diósgyőr – 2011
- Pablo Coira - Honvéd - 2010
- Fernando Cuerda - Honvéd - 2010
- Walter Fernández – Videoton – 2011–-13
- Fernando – Diósgyőr – 2012–13
- Francisco Gallardo – Diósgyőr, Puskás Akadémia – 2011–14
- Manu Hervás – Zalaegerszeg – 2011–12
- Juanan - Újpest - 2013–14
- José Luque – Diósgyőr – 2011–13
- Miguel Ángel Luque - Puskás Akadémia - 2012–14
- Christian Manrique - Debrecen - 2022-
- Héctor Martínez - Mezőkövesd - 2021–22
- David Mateos – Ferencváros – 2013–15
- Bruno Pascua - Dunaújváros - 2014–15
- Joaquín Pastor – Ferencváros – 2009–10
- Cristian Portilla – Honvéd – 2014
- Nono – Diósgyőr – 2016–18; 2021
- Daniel Orozco - Pápa - 2013
- Dani Ponce – Újpest – 2014
- Rufino - Honvéd - 2010–11
- Jairo Samperio - Honvéd - 2022-
- Héctor Sánchez – Videoton – 2011–13
- Sergio Tamayo – MTK – 2014–15
- Diego Vela – Diósgyőr – 2016–18

== Sudan ==
- Ibrahim Komi - Diósgyőr - 1999

== Sweden ==
- Kristian Benkő - Pápa - 2014
- Bojan Djordjic - Videoton - 2010–11
- Jack Lahne - Újpest - 2022-
- Adrian Oprisan - Stadler, MTK - 1994–96
- Anton Salétros - Újpest - 2017

== Switzerland ==
- Arnaud Bühler - Haladás - 2015
- Alessandro Iandoli - Újpest - 2012–13
- Mihael Kovačević - Nyíregyháza - 2015
- Zenun Selimi - Ferencváros - 1998–99
- Haris Tabaković - Debrecen, Diósgyőr - 2017–20

== Syria ==
- Ammar Ramadan - Ferencváros - 2020

== Tajikistan ==
- Oleg Shirinbekov - Vasas - 1991–94

== Togo ==
- Euloge Ahodikpe - Diósgyőr, Pápa - 2008–09; 2015
- Henritse Eninful - Újpest, Kecskemét - 2012–15
- Kassim Guyazou - Diósgyőr - 2008
- Francis Koné - Honvéd - 2015

== Trinidad and Tobago ==
- Akeem Adams – Ferencváros – 2013 ^{1}
- Densill Theobald - Újpest - 2007

== Tunisia ==
- Änis Ben-Hatira – Honvéd – 2019
- Aïssa Laïdouni - Ferencváros - 2020-
- Helmi Loussaief - Vasas - 2010

== Turkey ==
- Mahir Saglik – Vasas – 2016–17

== Uganda ==
- Martin Mutumba - Videoton - 2010

== Ukraine ==
- Oleksiy Antonov – Gyirmót – 2017
- Denys Bezborodko - Gyirmót - 2022
- Ivan Bobko – Debrecen – 2016
- Oleksandr Bondarenko - BVSC - 1994–99
- Andriy Boryachuk - Mezőkövesd - 2020
- Viktor Brovchenko - BVSC - 1998
- Valeriy Cap - Nyíregyháza - 1998
- Sergey Chaban - Pécs, Győr - 1993–96
- Ruslan Chernienko - Nyíregyháza, Videoton - 1999–01
- Vyacheslav Churko – Puskás Akadémia, Mezőkövesd – 2016; 2022
- Mykhaylo Denysov - Videoton - 2008
- Andriy Efremov – Szombathely – 2014–2015
- Artem Favorov - Puskás Akadémia, Zalaegerszeg - 2020-
- Yaroslav Gelesh - Kisvárda - 2022-
- Anatoliy Grytsayuk - Békéscsaba, Vasas - 1992–2000
- Yuriy Habovda - Balmazújváros, Haladás, Debrecen - 2017–20
- Viktor Hey - Kisvárda - 2018-
- Sergey Hleba - Stadler - 1994–95; 1997–98
- Oleh Holodyuk - Haladás, Zalaegerszeg - 2019
- Viktor Hrachov - Debrecen, BVSC - 1990–94
- Danylo Ihnatenko – Ferencváros – 2019
- Igor Juskevic - Stadler - 1996–97
- Roman Karasyuk - Kisvárda - 2018–21
- Ihor Kharatin – Ferencváros – 2019–21
- Vasyl Khimich - Kisvárda - 2020-
- Yuriy Kolomoyets – MTK – 2017
- Anton Kravchenko - Kisvárda - 2019-
- Vladyslav Kulach – Honvéd – 2019
- Serhiy Kuznetsov – Ferencváros – 2001–2002
- Artem Kychak - MTK - 2018–19
- Bogdan Lednev - MOL Fehérvár - 2022-
- Pavlo Lukyanchuk - Kisvárda - 2018–19
- Dmytro Lyopa – Puskás Akadémia – 2016
- Yevhenii Makarenko - MOL Fehérvár - 2021-
- Vyacheslav Medvid - Debrecen, Gázszer - 1993–99
- Bohdan Melnyk - Kisvárda - 2018-
- Mykhaylo Meskhi - Mezőkövesd, Kecskemét - 2018–21; 2022-
- Artem Milevskyi - Kisvárda - 2018
- Viktor Mokrytskyi - Stadler, Videoton, Gázszer - 1994–95; 1997–99
- Serhiy N. Morozov - MTK - 1991–92
- Oleg Mozgovoy - Dunaferr - 1999–00
- Oleksandr Nad – Honvéd, Gyirmót, Debrecen – 2016–21
- Viktor Natorov - MTK - 1998
- Andriy Nesterov - Mezőkövesd - 2019–21
- Ihor Nichenko – Stadler, Ferencváros, Dunaferr, Győr - 1995–04
- Oleksandr Nikiforov - BVSC, MTK - 1991–92; 1995–96
- Artem Odintsov - Kisvárda - 2020-
- Volodymyr Ovsienko – Nyíregyháza - 2010; 2014–15
- Volodymyr Parkhomenko - Diósgyőr - 1991–92
- Temur Partsvania - Kisvárda - 2018
- Yevhen Pavlov – Vasas – 2015–18
- Oleksandr Petrusenko - Honvéd - 2022
- Ivan Petryak – Ferencváros, Fehérvár – 2018–22
- Vyacheslav Polulyakh - Stadler - 1996–97
- Maksym Pukhtieiev - Honvéd - 2022-
- Vasyl Rats – Ferencváros – 1991–92
- Denys Rebryk - Vasas, Pápa, Siófok - 2007; 2009–11
- Myroslav Reshko - Stadler, BVSC - 1995–98
- Viktor Riznychenko - Kisvárda - 2020
- Oleksandr Romanchuk - Debrecen - 2022-
- Danylo Ryabenko - Mezőkövesd - 2020-
- Mykhaylo Ryashko - Kisvárda, Kecskemét - 2018–19; 2022-
- Oleksandr Safronov - Zalaegerszeg - 2022-
- Yevhen Selin - MTK - 2018–19
- Yuriy Selikhov - Stadler - 1996
- Artem Shabanov - MOL Fehérvár - 2022-
- Serhiy Shestakov - Diósgyőr - 2018–21
- Oleksiy Shvedyuk - Békéscsaba - 2016
- Yuriy Shevel - Nyíregyháza - 2008
- Serhiy Shubin - Diósgyőri VTK - 1993
- Anton Shynder - Kisvárda - 2018
- Vyacheslav Skunc - Nyíregyháza, Haladás - 1992; 1995
- Oleg Slobodskiy - Siófok - 1997–98
- Serhiy Svystun - Diósgyőr - 1991–93
- Oleg Sych - Haladás - 1992; 1994
- Volodymyr Tanchyk – Gyirmót – 2017
- Oleksandr Tkachuk - Videoton - 2009
- Roman Tolochko - Pécs - 1993–96
- Yuriy Ushmaev - Békéscsaba - 1992–95
- Vladimir Vachilya - Stadler - 1996–97
- Andriy Yakymiv - Kaposvár - 2019–20
- Pavlo Yanchuk – Honvéd – 2010
- Kyrylo Yanitskyi - Puskás Akadémia - 2021-
- Andriy Yefremov - Haladás - 2014
- Oleksandr Zubkov – Ferencváros – 2019–22

== United States ==
- Ryan Caugherty - Tatabánya - 2007
- Eduvie Ikoba – Zalaegerszeg – 2019–20; 2022-
- Christopher Sullivan – Győr – 1990; 1996–97
- Peter Vermes – Győr – 1988–89
- Henry Wingo - Ferencváros - 2021-
- Eric McWoods - Zalaegerszeg - 2020

== Uruguay ==
- Washington Aires - Vasas - 1990–92
- Pablo Caballero - Vasas - 2010
- Fernando Gorriarán – Ferencváros – 2017–19
- Rodrigo Rojo – Újpest – 2014–15
- Gonzalo Vega - Puskás Akadémia - 2018–19

== Venezuela ==
- Frank Feltscher – Debrecen – 2017-present
- Josua Mejías - Debrecen - 2025-present
- Jesús Meza – Honvéd – 2015

== Zambia ==
- Misheck Lungu – Pápa, Honvéd - 2006; 2009
- Lloyd Mumba - Pápa - 2006

== Notes ==
- Note 1: suffered heart attack after Ferencvárosi TC–Újpest FC derby on 27 September 2013 and died 30 December 2013.
1. Born in Austria (then part of Austria-Hungary)
2. Born in Germany
3. Born in Sweden
4. Capped for the Germany national under-18 football team
5. Capped for the Sweden men's national under-17 football team
6. Capped for the Sweden men's national under-19 football team
