= 2010–11 Szolnoki MÁV FC season =

Szolnok
2010–11 season
- Chairman: Gábor Ferencz
- Manager: Attila Vágó (until 4 October); Dénes Tóth (caretaker, from 4 October to 18 October); Antal Simon (from 18 October)
- Stadium: Tiszaligeti Stadion
- Nemzeti Bajnokság I: 16th (relegated)
- Magyar Kupa: Third round
- Ligakupa: Group stage
- Top goalscorer: League: Mohamed Remili (7); All: Mohamed Remili (8)
- Highest home attendance: 3,000 v Ferencváros (7 May 2011, Nemzeti Bajnokság I)
- Lowest home attendance: 100 (Ligakupa matches)
- Average home league attendance: 1,346
- Biggest win: 3–1 v Paks (Home, 14 August 2010, Nemzeti Bajnokság I)
- Biggest defeat: 0–4 v Siófok (Home, 2 October 2010, Nemzeti Bajnokság I); 0–4 v Debrecen (Away, 7 November 2010, Nemzeti Bajnokság I); 0–4 v Kecskemét (Away, 24 November 2010, Ligakupa)

The 2010–11 season was Szolnoki MÁV Football Club's 10th competitive season, 99th year in existence as a football club and first season in the Nemzeti Bajnokság I after winning the East group of the second division in the previous season. In addition to the domestic league, Szolnok participated in that season's editions of the Magyar Kupa and the Ligakupa.

On 5 June 2010, the club got promoted to the first tier after 62 years when their title challengers, Dunakanyar-Vác lost 3–1 against Debrecen II.

Szolnok would have started the season in Kecskemét, 70 km away, after the Tiszaligeti Stadion was not granted a license due to the poor condition. Renovation work began in the summer to avoid moving to a temporary stadium.

On 4 October, the contract of Attila Vágó was terminated by mutual agreement after 2 years with the team. Dénes Tóth was named caretaker manager, and on 18 October, Antal Simon was appointed as the permanent manager.

On 7 May 2011, last placed Szolnok lost 3–2 to visiting Ferencváros in the first match of the 27th round of the league on Saturday, ensuring their relegation.

== Squad ==
Squad at end of season

Note: Flags indicate national team as defined under FIFA eligibility rules; some limited exceptions apply. Players may hold more than one non-FIFA nationality.

No.	Pos.	Nation	Player
1	GK	LAT	Vitālijs Meļņičenko
4	MF	HUN	Ádám Rokszin
5	MF	HUN	Botond Szalai
7	MF	HUN	Norbert Némedi
8	MF	HUN	Béla Lengyel
9	DF	MNE	Nenad Đurović
10	MF	CMR	Joseph Ngalle
11	FW	HUN	Róbert Zsolnai
12	MF	HUN	Patrik Blaskovits
13	MF	HUN	László Fitos
15	DF	HUN	Pál Balogh
17	DF	HUN	Gábor Antal

No.	Pos.	Nation	Player
19	MF	SRB	Miloš Jokić
20	DF	HUN	Zoltán Búrány
21	FW	CMR	Hervé Tchami
22	DF	HUN	Péter Máté
27	DF	SRB	Branislav Vukomanović
29	FW	HUN	Ferenc Kalmár
33	DF	SRB	Boris Miličić
55	FW	SRB	Dragan Gošić
66	GK	HUN	István Kövesfalvi
70	GK	HUN	Péter Rézsó
77	FW	HUN	Mohamed Remili

== Transfers ==
=== Transfers in ===
Transfer window	Pos.	No.	Player	From
Summer	FW	4	(Lithuania) Eimantas Marozas	(Lithuania) Atletas Kaunas
Summer	MF	10	(Cameroon) Joseph Ngalle	Makó
Summer	MF	14	(Hungary) Péter Vörös	Kecskemét
Summer	DF	20	(Hungary) Zoltán Búrány	Diósgyőr
Summer	FW	21	(Cameroon) Hervé Tchami	(Czech Republic) Karviná
Summer	FW	29	(Hungary) Gábor Koós	Budaörs
Summer	DF	36	(Hungary) Szabolcs Schindler	Kecskemét
Summer	GK	85	(Hungary) Pál Tarczy	BKV Előre
Winter	GK	1	(Latvia) Vitālijs Meļņičenko	(Latvia) Skonto
Winter	MF	4	(Hungary) Ádám Rokszin	Szolnok II
Winter	MF	7	(Hungary) Norbert Némedi	Kecskemét
Winter	DF	9	(Montenegro) Nenad Đurović	(Serbia) Inđija
Winter	FW	11	(Hungary) Róbert Zsolnai	Honvéd
Winter	MF	19	(Serbia) Miloš Jokić	(Serbia) BASK
Winter	DF	27	(Serbia) Branislav Vukomanović	(Bosnia and Herzegovina) Sloboda Tuzla
Winter	DF	33	(Serbia) Boris Miličić	(Serbia) Inđija

=== Transfers out ===
Transfer window	Pos.	No.	Player	To
Summer	GK	1	(Hungary) Balázs Farkas	(Cyprus) Digenis Akritas Morphou
Summer	FW	30	(Hungary) Zsolt Nagy	Released
Winter	DF	2	(Hungary) Zoltán Molnár	Veszprém
Winter	FW	4	(Lithuania) Eimantas Marozas	Released
Winter	FW	9	(Brazil) Alex José de Paula	Veszprém
Winter	MF	11	(Hungary) Tamás Hevesi-Tóth	Veszprém
Winter	MF	14	(Hungary) Péter Vörös	(Austria) Zwentendorf
Winter	DF	19	(Romania) Claudiu Cornaci	Released
Winter	DF	27	(Hungary) Zoltán Pető	Törtel
Winter	DF	33	(Hungary) Gyula Hegedűs	Veszprém
Winter	DF	36	(Hungary) Szabolcs Schindler	Biatorbágy
Winter	GK	85	(Hungary) Pál Tarczy	Szigetszentmiklós

=== Loans in ===
Transfer window	Pos.	No.	Player	From	End date
Summer	FW	6	(Canada) Igor Pisanjuk	Ferencváros	Middle of season
Summer	DF	13	(Montenegro) Petar Stanišić	Nyíregyháza	Middle of season
Summer	FW	77	(Hungary) Mohamed Remili	Újpest	End of season
Winter	MF	13	(Hungary) László Fitos	Ferencváros	End of season
Winter	DF	22	(Hungary) Péter Máté	Debrecen	End of season

=== Loans out ===
Transfer window	Pos.	No.	Player	To	End date
Winter	DF	7	(Hungary) Krisztián Mile	Eger	End of season
Winter	FW	29	(Hungary) Gábor Koós	Budaörs	End of season

== Competitions ==
=== Overview ===
Competition	First match	Last match	Starting round	Final position	Record							
Competition	First match	Last match	Starting round	Final position	Pld	W	D	L	GF	GA	GD	Win %
Nemzeti Bajnokság I	7 August 2010	22 May 2011	Matchday 1	16th	30	5	6	19	26	56	−30	16.67
Magyar Kupa	21 September 2010	21 September 2010	Third round	Third round	1	0	0	1	1	2	−1	0.00
Ligakupa	24 July 2010	2 December 2010	Group stage	Group stage	4	1	1	2	6	10	−4	25.00
Total					35	6	7	22	33	68	−35	17.14

Source: Competitions

=== Nemzeti Bajnokság I ===
==== League table ====
Pos	Team	Pld	W	D	L	GF	GA	GD	Pts	Qualification or relegation
12	Kecskemét	30	11	3	16	51	56	−5	36	Qualification for Europa League second qualifying round (Note: Kecskemét have qualified for the second qualifying round of the 2011–12 UEFA Europa League after winning the 2010–11 Hungarian Cup.)
13	Pápa	30	10	5	15	39	52	−13	35	
14	Siófok	30	8	10	12	29	41	−12	34	
15	MTK (R)	30	8	6	16	35	49	−14	30	Relegation to Nemzeti Bajnokság II
16	Szolnok (R)	30	5	6	19	26	56	−30	21	Relegation to Nemzeti Bajnokság II

Source: soccerway.com
Rules for classification: 1st points; 2nd overall wins; 3rd goal difference; 4th goals scored
(R) Relegated

==== Results summary ====
Overall								Home						Away					
Pld	W	D	L	GF	GA	GD	Pts	W	D	L	GF	GA	GD	W	D	L	GF	GA	GD
30	5	6	19	26	56	−30	21	4	3	8	16	26	−10	1	3	11	10	30	−20

Source: Hungarian Football Federation

==== Results by round ====
Round	1	2	3	4	5	6	7	8	9	10	11	12	13	14	15	16	17	18	19	20	21	22	23	24	25	26	27	28	29	30
Ground	H	A	H	A	H	A	H	A	H	A	H	A	A	H	A	A	H	A	H	A	H	A	H	A	H	A	H	A	A	H
Result	D	D	W	L	L	L	L	L	L	L	W	L	L	L	L	L	D	L	W	D	D	L	W	D	L	L	L	L	W	L
Position	9	9	7	10	11	13	15	15	15	15	15	15	16	16	16	16	16	16	16	16	16	16	16	16	16	16	16	16	16	16
Points	1	2	5	5	5	5	5	5	5	5	8	8	8	8	8	8	9	9	12	13	14	14	17	18	18	18	18	18	21	21

Source: Matches
A = Away; H = Home; W = Win; D = Draw; L = Loss

==== Matches ====
7 August 2010 2	Pápa	0–0	Szolnok	Pápa
19:00 CEST (UTC+2)	N. Tóth (yellow card) 49'	Report	Cornaci (yellow card) 40'; Hegedűs (yellow card) 61'; Búrány (yellow card) 80'; Ngalle (yellow card) 85'	Stadium: Perutz Stadion; Attendance: 1,300; Referee: Roland Veizer; Assistant referees: Péter Berettyán, Róbert Horváth; Fourth official: Tibor Gyarmati II

14 August 2010 3	Szolnok	3–1	Paks	Szolnok
17:00 CEST (UTC+2)	De Paula 23'; Pisanjuk (yellow card) 45'; Remili 45'; Lengyel (yellow card) 77', (goal) 90+3'	Report	Sipeki (yellow card) 52', (goal) 63'	Stadium: Tiszaligeti Stadion; Attendance: 2,500; Referee: J. Zoltán Kovács; Assistant referees: Attila Kelemen, János Demeter; Fourth official: Gergő Janitz

21 August 2010 4	Kecskemét	4–2	Szolnok	Kecskemét
20:00 CEST (UTC+2)	Simon 3'; Litsingi 5', 43'; Balogh 20'; Lambulić (yellow card) 21'; Gyagya (yellow card) 29'	Report	Hegedűs (yellow card) 3'; De Paula 16'; Pető (yellow card) 18'; Pisanjuk (yellow card) 26'; Búrány (yellow card) 52'; Remili (yellow card) 76'; Molnár (red card) 85'	Stadium: Széktói Stadion; Attendance: 2,200; Referee: Szabolcs Szilasi; Assistant referees: Oszkár Lémon, Zoltán Kis; Fourth official: László Lovas

28 August 2010 5	Szolnok	0–2	Honvéd	Szolnok
17:30 CEST (UTC+2)	Pető (yellow card) 36'; Schindler (yellow card) 63'; Hevesi-Tóth (yellow card) 74'	Report	Sadjo 21'; Segovia (yellow card) 41', (goal) 88'; Cuerda (yellow card) 46'; Cirino (yellow card) 77'	Stadium: Tiszaligeti Stadion; Attendance: 2,000; Referee: Tamás Bognár; Assistant referees: Zsolt Szpisják, Attila Forgács; Fourth official: Ferenc Karakó

4 September 2010 1	Szolnok	0–0	Haladás	Szolnok
16:00 CEST (UTC+2)	Remili (yellow card) 38'; Ngalle (yellow card) 65'	Report	D. Lengyel (yellow card) 21'; Kenesei (yellow card) 85'; Á. Simon (yellow card) 87'	Stadium: Tiszaligeti Stadion; Attendance: 1,500; Referee: János Takács; Assistant referees: János Demeter, Tamás Márkus; Fourth official: Ádám Radványi
Note: The match was originally scheduled for 31 July 2010, but was postponed due to a friendly between Haladás and Werder Bremen.

12 September 2010 6	Videoton	3–1	Szolnok	Székesfehérvár
17:30 CEST (UTC+2)	Hidvégi (yellow card) 40'; Lipták 52'; Sándor 64', (yellow card) 70'; Alves 77'; Anđić (yellow card) 88'	Report	De Paula 41'; Mile (red card) 76'; Pető (yellow card) 90'	Stadium: Sóstói Stadion; Attendance: 2,754; Referee: Gábor Oláh; Assistant referees: Zsolt Butkai, Zsolt Márton; Fourth official: Balázs Böcskei

18 September 2010 7	Szolnok	0–3	Győr	Szolnok
15:00 CEST (UTC+2)	Pető (yellow card) 33'; Hevesi-Tóth (yellow card) 69'; Molnár (red card) 89'	Report	Tokody (yellow card) 28'; Koltai 37'; Ceolin 51', 73'; Dinjar (yellow card) 79'; Pilibaitis (red card) 87'	Stadium: Tiszaligeti Stadion; Attendance: 1,000; Referee: József Berger; Assistant referees: Attila Kelemen, Attila Forgács; Fourth official: László Varga

24 September 2010 8	Újpest	1–0	Szolnok	Budapest
19:00 CEST (UTC+2)	B. Balogh 90+2'	Report		Stadium: Szusza Ferenc Stadion; Attendance: 0 Referee: J. Zoltán Kovács; Assistant referees: Vencel Tóth II, Gábor Kormányos II; Fourth official: László Lovas

2 October 2010 9	Szolnok	0–4	Siófok	Szolnok
13:00 CEST (UTC+2)	Vörös (yellow card) 41'; Remili (yellow card) 89'	Report	Honma 5'; Lukács 8'; Novák 59'; Graszl 74'	Stadium: Tiszaligeti Stadion; Attendance: 500; Referee: Sándor Andó-Szabó; Assistant referees: István Albert, Péter Berettyán; Fourth official: Gergely Szőts

16 October 2010 10	Vasas	3–0	Szolnok	Budapest
17:00 CEST (UTC+2)	Pető 23' (o.g.); Lázok 58', 90'; Pantskhava (yellow card) 76'	Report	Hevesi-Tóth (yellow card) 44'; Lengyel (yellow card) 85'	Stadium: Illovszky Rudolf Stadion; Attendance: 1,700; Referee: Szabolcs Szilasi; Assistant referees: Oszkár Lémon, Gábor Takács; Fourth official: Dávid Ákos

23 October 2010 11	Szolnok	2–1	MTK	Szolnok
13:00 CEST (UTC+2)	Stanišić 17'; Rézsó (yellow card) 50'; Remili 68'; Vörös (yellow card) 83'	Report	Tischler 50'; Sütő (red card) 67'; Kanta (yellow card) 70'; Nikházi (yellow card) 77'; Vukadinović (yellow card) 82'	Stadium: Tiszaligeti Stadion; Attendance: 800; Referee: Ádám Németh; Assistant referees: Balázs Farkas, Gábor Kormányos II; Fourth official: Gábor Fajkusz

30 October 2010 12	Ferencváros	1–0	Szolnok	Budapest
15:00 CEST (UTC+2)	Schembri (yellow card) 19'; Rodenbücher 63'	Report	Stanišić (red card) 90'	Stadium: Stadion Albert Flórián; Attendance: 3,500; Referee: József Berger; Assistant referees: Tibor Vámos, Attila Forgács; Fourth official: László Lovas

7 November 2010 13	Debrecen	4–0	Szolnok	Debrecen
17:30 CET (UTC+1)	Szakály 56', 70'; Coulibaly 83'; Šimac 90+1'	Report		Stadium: Oláh Gábor utcai Stadion; Attendance: 3,000; Referee: Tamás Bognár; Assistant referees: Dr. Zsolt Varga, Lajos L. Tóth; Fourth official: Gábor Péter Kovács

13 November 2010 14	Szolnok	1–2	Kaposvár	Szolnok
13:00 CET (UTC+1)	Pető (yellow card) 9'; Ngalle 60'; Cornaci (yellow card) 62'	Report	Szepessy 2', (yellow card) 90'; Okuka (yellow card) 14'; Hegedűs (yellow card) 16'; Perić 66'; Zahorecz (yellow card) 86'	Stadium: Tiszaligeti Stadion; Attendance: 600; Referee: Álvaro García Miquel; Assistant referees: Róbert Kispál, Zsolt Butkai; Fourth official: Gergő Janitz

20 November 2010 15	Zalaegerszeg	2–1	Szolnok	Zalaegerszeg
16:00 CET (UTC+1)	Miljatovič 16'; Kamber 52'; Barna (yellow card) 90'	Report	Remili (yellow card) 25', (goal) 87'; Mile (yellow card) 34'; Koós (yellow card) 57'; Cornaci (yellow card) 67'; Pisanjuk (red card) 83'	Stadium: ZTE Arena; Attendance: 2,354; Referee: J. Zoltán Kovács; Assistant referees: László Viszokai, Zoltán Kis; Fourth official: Dániel Becséri

27 November 2010 16	Haladás	3–1	Szolnok	Szombathely
16:00 CET (UTC+1)	Irhás (yellow card) 20'; Tóth (yellow card) 32'; Á. Simon (yellow card) 48'; Oross 54'; Nagy 61'; Kenesei 80'	Report	Antal (yellow card) 26'; Remili 58', (red card) 64'; Szalai (yellow card) 67'	Stadium: Rohonci út Attendance: 2,500; Referee: Gergely Sulyok; Assistant referees: Péter Berettyán, Zsolt Márton; Fourth official: Szabolcs Fenyvesi

5 March 2011 18	Paks	3–1	Szolnok	Paks
14:30 CET (UTC+1)	Böde 6'; Bartha 16'; Montvai 52'	Report	Némedi 27'; Miličić (yellow card) 70'	Stadium: Fehérvári úti Stadion; Attendance: 500; Referee: Ádám Radványi; Assistant referees: Dr. Zsolt Varga, János Demeter; Fourth official: Mihály Fábián

8 March 2011 17	Szolnok	2–2	Pápa	Szolnok
14:30 CET (UTC+1)	Némedi 39', 63'	Report	Marić 28', (yellow card) 65'; Rajnay (yellow card) 63'; Bárányos 73'	Stadium: Tiszaligeti Stadion; Attendance: 300; Referee: János Takács; Assistant referees: Lajos L. Tóth, Gábor Kormányos II; Fourth official: László Lovas
Note: The match was originally scheduled for 4 December 2010, but was postponed to 26 February 2011 due to snow, and later another time for the same reason mentioned above.

12 March 2011 19	Szolnok	2–1	Kecskemét	Szolnok
14:30 CET (UTC+1)	Remili 20', 26'; Miličić (yellow card) 30'; Némedi (yellow card) 36'	Report	Rybánsky (yellow card) 19'; Alempijević (yellow card) 25'; Tököli 58'; Litsingi (yellow card) 77'	Stadium: Tiszaligeti Stadion; Attendance: 2,000; Referee: Szabolcs Szilasi; Assistant referees: Oszkár Lémon, János Medovarszki; Fourth official: Zoltán Iványi

19 March 2011 20	Honvéd	0–0	Szolnok	Budapest
17:00 CET (UTC+1)	Fieber (yellow card) 76'	Report		Stadium: Bozsik József Stadion; Attendance: 500; Referee: Roland Veizer; Assistant referees: Péter Berettyán, Róbert Horváth; Fourth official: Ferenc Karakó

2 April 2011 21	Szolnok	1–1	Videoton	Szolnok
15:00 CEST (UTC+2)	Zsolnai 15'; Đurović (yellow card) 49'; Jokić (yellow card) 55'	Report	Gosztonyi (yellow card) 11'; Alves 33'	Stadium: Tiszaligeti Stadion; Attendance: 2,000; Referee: Gábor Oláh; Assistant referees: István Albert, Zsolt Butkai; Fourth official: László Lovas

9 April 2011 22	Győr	4–2	Szolnok	Győr
17:30 CEST (UTC+2)	Fehér (yellow card) 23'; Dinjar 31'; Ji-Paraná 54'; Đorđević 90+1'; Völgyi (yellow card) 90+1'; Dudás 90+2', (yellow card) 90+2'	Report	Remili (yellow card) 45'; Némedi 50'; Miličić (yellow card) 54'; Ngalle (red card) 83'; Máté (yellow card) 87'; Đurović 88'	Stadium: ETO Park; Attendance: 2,000; Referee: J. Zoltán Kovács; Assistant referees: István Tóth, Zsolt Márton; Fourth official: Krisztián Pánczél

15 April 2011 23	Szolnok	1–0	Újpest	Szolnok
17:00 CEST (UTC+2)	Fitos 31'; Lengyel (yellow card) 36'; Đurović (yellow card) 45'	Report	Lázár (yellow card) 38'; Tajthy (yellow card) 90'	Stadium: Tiszaligeti Stadion; Attendance: 2,000; Referee: Ádám Radványi; Assistant referees: Dr. Zsolt Varga, Zoltán Pápai; Fourth official: Róbert Nagy

23 April 2011 24	Siófok	1–1	Szolnok	Siófok
17:00 CEST (UTC+2)	Mogyorósi (yellow card) 20'; Délczeg 74'	Report	Miličić 35'	Stadium: Révész Géza utcai Stadion; Attendance: 1,000; Referee: Péter Solymosi; Assistant referees: Péter Berettyán, Róbert Horváth; Fourth official: László Varga

27 April 2011 25	Szolnok	0–1	Vasas	Szolnok
17:00 CEST (UTC+2)	Vukomanović (yellow card) 51'; Jokić (yellow card) 63'; Fitos (yellow card) 85'	Report	Ferenczi 19'; Szilágyi (yellow card) 39'; Gašpar (yellow card) 61'; Ponczók (yellow card) 80'	Stadium: Tiszaligeti Stadion; Attendance: 1,000; Referee: János Takács; Assistant referees: Lajos L. Tóth, Gábor Kormányos II; Fourth official: Csaba Sándor

30 April 2011 26	MTK	1–0	Szolnok	Budapest
18:00 CEST (UTC+2)	Pátkai (yellow card) 16'; Pál 35'	Report	Miličić (yellow card) 90+1'	Stadium: Hidegkuti Nándor Stadion; Attendance: 800; Referee: Zsolt Szabó; Assistant referees: László Viszokai, Zoltán Kis; Fourth official: Balázs Berke

7 May 2011 27	Szolnok	2–3	Ferencváros	Szolnok
15:00 CEST (UTC+2)	Zsolnai 22', 45'; Gošić (yellow card) 26'; Đurović (yellow card) 41'; Lengyel (yellow card) 53'; Némedi (yellow card) 64'	Report	Pölöskei 20'; Schembri 23'; Rósa 42', (yellow card) 60'; Aílton Júnior (yellow card) 79'; Morales (yellow card) 90'	Stadium: Tiszaligeti Stadion; Attendance: 3,000; Referee: Józzef Berger; Assistant referees: Attila Forgács, István Tóth; Fourth official: Gábor Fajkusz

10 May 2011 28	Szolnok	1–2	Debrecen	Szolnok
17:30 CEST (UTC+2)	Đurović (yellow card) 43'; Tchami 49'; Szalai (yellow card) 63'; Némedi (yellow card) 90+1'	Report	Szakály 9'; Coulibaly 19'; Ramos (yellow card) 64'	Stadium: Tiszaligeti Stadion; Attendance: 500; Referee: Ádám Farkas; Assistant referees: Dr. Zsolt Varga, Tamás Márkus; Fourth official: Eszter Urbán

14 May 2011 29	Kaposvár	0–1	Szolnok	Kaposvár
19:00 CEST (UTC+2)	Okuka (yellow card) 65'	Report	Némedi (yellow card) 43'; Tchami 66'; Jokić (yellow card) 83'	Stadium: Rákóczi Stadion; Attendance: 3,000; Referee: Gyöngyi Gaál; Assistant referees: Balázs Farkas, Arnold Kepe; Fourth official: Balázs Berke

22 May 2011 30	Szolnok	1–3	Zalaegerszeg	Szolnok
17:30 CEST (UTC+2)	Jokić (yellow card) 28'; Miličić 53'	Report	Kamber 21', (yellow card) 38'; Miljatovič (yellow card) 39'; Balázs 41'; Máté 61' (o.g.); Horváth (yellow card) 72'; Varga (yellow card) 79'	Stadium: Tiszaligeti Stadion; Attendance: 500; Referee: Ádám Radványi; Assistant referees: Lajos L. Tóth, Dr. Judit Kulcsár; Fourth official: Csaba Sándor

=== Magyar Kupa ===
21 September 2010 Third round	Tisza Volán	2–1	Szolnok	Szeged
15:30 CEST (UTC+2)	Mészáros 11'; Huszárik (yellow card) 21'; Beretka (yellow card) 45'; Buzási (yellow card) 68'; Czirják (yellow card) 71'; Völgyi 88'	Report	Pisanjuk 50', (red card) 90+3'; Hevesi-Tóth (yellow card) 69'	Stadium: Felső Tisza-parti Stadion; Attendance: 250; Referee: Balázs Böcskei; Assistant referees: Balázs Farkas, Gábor Kovács II

=== Ligakupa ===
==== Group stage ====
Pos	Team	Pld	W	D	L	GF	GA	GD	Pts	Qualification	KEC	SZL	HON
1	Kecskemét	4	3	1	0	11	3	+8	10	Advance to knockout phase	—	4–0	4–2
2	Szolnok	4	1	1	2	6	10	−4	4		1–1	—	3–4
3	Honvéd	4	1	0	3	7	11	−4	3		0–2	1–2	—

24 July 2010 1	Honvéd	1–2	Szolnok	Budapest
17:00 CEST (UTC+2)	Jammeh 32'; Cséke (yellow card) 38'; Horváth (yellow card) 67'	Report	Mile (yellow card) 22'; Búrány (yellow card) 52'; Koós 60'; Pető 70'	Stadium: Bozsik József Stadion; Attendance: 400; Referee: János Takács; Assistant referees: Lajos L. Tóth, Gyula Ortó

3 November 2010 2	Szolnok	1–1	Kecskemét	Szolnok
13:00 CET (UTC+1)	Antal (yellow card) 23'; Koós 58'	Report	Szabó (yellow card) 70'; Csordás 90+1'	Stadium: Tiszaligeti Stadion; Attendance: 100; Referee: Gyöngyi Gaál; Assistant referees: Gábor Varga Jr., Gábor Kovács II

24 November 2010 3	Kecskemét	4–0	Szolnok	Kecskemét
13:00 CET (UTC+1)	Dosso 30', 55'; Ebala (yellow card) 32'; Savić 59'; Litsingi 70'	Report	Hevesi-Tóth (yellow card) 27'; Tarczy (yellow card) 58'; Antal (yellow card) 73'	Stadium: Széktói Stadion; Attendance: 200; Referee: Gergely Szőts

1 December 2010 4	Szolnok	3–4	Honvéd	Szolnok
12:45 CET (UTC+1)	Remili 33'; Rokszin (yellow card) 42'; Ngalle 43'; Hevesi-Tóth 63'; Vörös (red card) 90'	Report	Rufino 21', 47', 60'; Nagy 76'	Stadium: Tiszaligeti Stadion; Attendance: 100; Referee: Eszter Urbán; Assistant referees: Lajos L. Tóth, Dr. Judit Kulcsár; Fourth official: Ádám Farkas

== Statistics ==
=== Overall ===
Appearances (Apps) numbers are for appearances in competitive games only, including sub appearances.
Source: Competitions

No.	Player	Pos.	Nemzeti Bajnokság I				Magyar Kupa				Ligakupa				Total			
No.	Player	Pos.	Apps	Goal	Yellow card	Red card	Apps	Goal	Yellow card	Red card	Apps	Goal	Yellow card	Red card	Apps	Goal	Yellow card	Red card
1	(Latvia) Vitālijs Meļņičenko	GK	13												13			
2	(Hungary) Zoltán Molnár	DF	13			2					3				16			2
4	(Lithuania) Eimantas Marozas	FW	2												2			
4	(Hungary) Ádám Rokszin	MF									3		1		3		1	
5	(Hungary) Botond Szalai	MF	19		2		1				2				22		2	
6	(Hungary) Nándor Benedek	FW									1				1			
6	(Hungary) Patrik Blaskovits	MF									2				2			
6	(Hungary) Márk Felföldi	MF									1				1			
6	(Canada) Igor Pisanjuk	FW	11		2	1	1	1		1					12	1	2	2
7	(Hungary) Krisztián Mile	DF	4		1	1	1				3		1		8		2	1
7	(Hungary) Norbert Némedi	MF	13	4	4										13	4	4	
8	(Hungary) Béla Lengyel	MF	19	1	4						3				22	1	4	
9	(Brazil) Alex José de Paula	FW	12	3			1				1				14	3		
9	(Montenegro) Nenad Đurović	DF	13	1	4										13	1	4	
10	(Cameroon) Joseph Ngalle	MF	19	1	2	1	1				2	1			22	2	2	1
11	(Hungary) Tamás Hevesi-Tóth	MF	10		3		1		1		4	1	1		15	1	5	
11	(Hungary) Róbert Zsolnai	FW	14	3											14	3		
13	(Hungary) László Fitos	MF	14	1	1										14	1	1	
13	(Montenegro) Petar Stanišić	DF	8	1		1	1				2				11	1		1
13	(Hungary) Gábor Szép										1				1			
14	(Hungary) Péter Vörös	MF	10		2		1				3			1	14		2	1
15	(Hungary) Pál Balogh	DF	15								1				16			
15	(Hungary) Viktor Urbán-Szabó	DF									1				1			
17	(Hungary) Gábor Antal	DF	17		1		1				4		2		22		3	
19	(Romania) Claudiu Cornaci	DF	8		3						1				9		3	
19	(Serbia) Miloš Jokić	MF	13		4										13		4	
20	(Hungary) Zoltán Búrány	DF	24		2		1				3		1		28		3	
21	(Cameroon) Hervé Tchami	FW	20	2			1				3				24	2		
22	(Hungary) Péter Máté	DF	13		1										13		1	
27	(Hungary) Zoltán Pető	DF	13		5						1	1			14	1	5	
27	(Serbia) Branislav Vukomanović	DF	14		1										14		1	
29	(Hungary) Ferenc Kalmár	FW									2				2			
29	(Hungary) Gábor Koós	FW	15		1		1				3	2			19	2	1	
33	(Hungary) Gyula Hegedűs	DF	4		2						1				5		2	
33	(Hungary) Tamás Kalóz										1				1			
33	(Serbia) Boris Miličić	DF	14	2	4										14	2	4	
36	(Hungary) Szabolcs Schindler	DF	10		1		1				2				13		1	
55	(Serbia) Dragan Gošić	FW	7		1										7		1	
66	(Hungary) István Kövesfalvi	GK	3												3			
70	(Hungary) Péter Rézsó	GK	7		1		1								8		1	
77	(Hungary) Mohamed Remili	FW	20	7	4	1					2	1			22	8	4	1
77	(Hungary) Nándor Tóth										1				1			
85	(Hungary) Pál Tarczy	GK	7								4		1		11		1	
Own goals																		
Totals				26	56	7		1	1	1		6	7	1		33	64	9

=== Clean sheets ===
			Clean sheets			
No.	Player	Games Played	Nemzeti Bajnokság I	Magyar Kupa	Ligakupa	Total
1	(Latvia) Vitālijs Meļņičenko	13	3			3
66	(Hungary) István Kövesfalvi	3	1			1
85	(Hungary) Pál Tarczy	11	1			1
70	(Hungary) Péter Rézsó	8				0
Totals			5			5
