= Béla Lengyel =

Béla Lengyel may refer to:

- Béla Lengyel (football player) (born 1990), Hungarian football player
- Béla Lengyel (general) (1897-1988), Hungarian general
