= Milan Oraze =

Austrian footballer

Personal information
- Date of birth: 29 March 1967 (age 59)
- Place of birth: Klagenfurt, Austria
- Height: 1.90 m (6 ft 3 in)
- Position: Goalkeeper

Senior career*
| Years | Team | Apps | (Gls) |
| 1989–1991 | SAK Klagenfurt | | |
| 1991–1997 | FC Tirol Innsbruck | | |
| 1995 | → SV Ried (loan) | | |
| 1997–1998 | VSE St. Pölten | | |
| 1998–2004 | SV Ried | | |
| 2004–2005 | Budapest Honvéd FC | | |
| 2005–2009 | SAK Klagenfurt | | |

Managerial career
- 2008–2013: SAK Klagenfurt (goalkeeper coach)
- * Club domestic league appearances and goals

Milan Oraze (born 29 March 1967) is a retired Austrian football goalkeeper and later manager.
