= Zoltán Pető =

Hungarian footballer

Personal information
- Date of birth: 19 September 1974 (age 52)
- Place of birth: Szolnok, Hungary
- Height: 1.80 m (5 ft 11 in)
- Position: Defender

Senior career*
Years	Team	Apps	(Gls)
1993–2000	Debrecen	182	(8)
2000	FC Geel	10	(0)
2000–2002	Újpest	39	(0)
2002–2003	MTK Budapest	10	(0)
2003–2004	FC Sopron	28	(2)
2004–2005	Kayserispor	4	(0)
2005–2008	Brussels	83	(1)
2008–2009	Felcsút	22	(0)
2009–2011	Szolnok	35	(2)
2011	Tortel KSK	14	(1)
2011	Nagykőrösi Kinizsi	48	(8)
Total		475	(24)

International career
2000–2006	Hungary	8	(0)
- * Club domestic league appearances and goals

Zoltán Pető (born 19 September 1974) is a Hungarian former professional footballer who played as a defender for Debreceni VSC, K.F.C. Verbroedering Geel, Újpest FC, MTK Hungária FC, FC Brussels, MFC Sopron, Kayserispor and the Hungary national team.

== Clubs ==
He started his career in Debrecen, staying for eight seasons and winning a domestic cup; in 2000 he moved to Belgium to Verbroedering Geel.
