= Béla Lengyel (general) =

Hungarian general

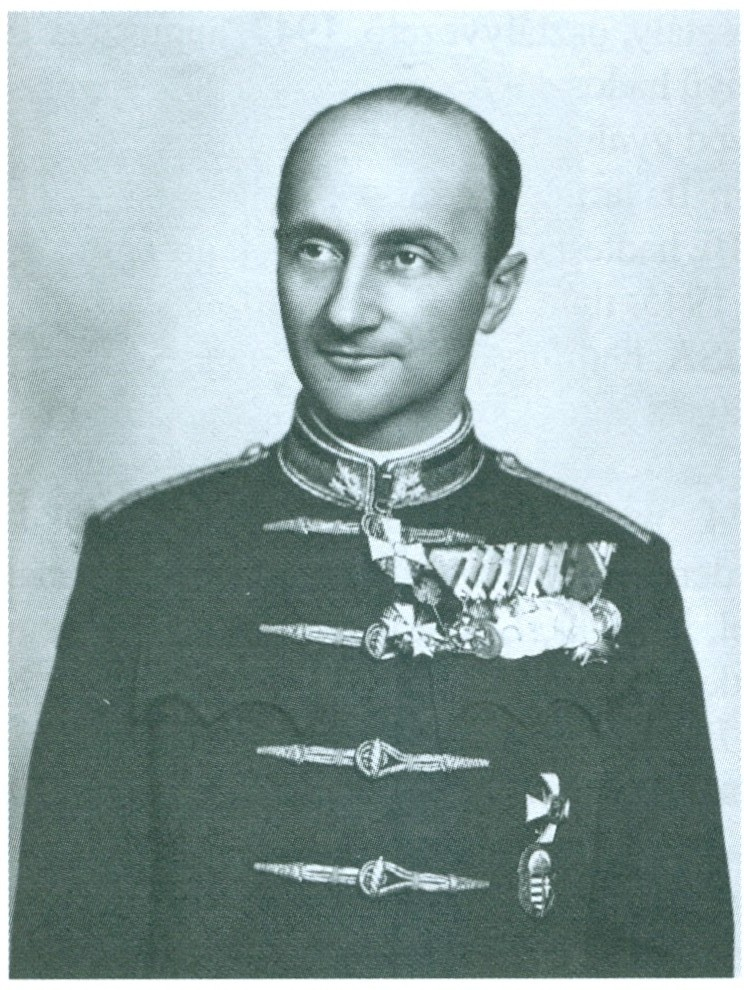
Lengyel

Béla Lengyel (19 April 1897 – 20 December 1988) was an Austro-Hungarian and Hungarian major general. He was born in Szarvas and died in Graz.

== Career ==
Lengyel fought in the First World War and in the Hungarian–Romanian War. After these, he joined the troops of Admiral Miklós Horthy and studied at the Ludovica Academy until 1925. In 1934, he became military attaché of the Kingdom of Hungary to Poland, Lithuania, Estonia, Finland and Latvia. He remained at this post until 1939. The Hungarian leadership dismissed his proposal to send Hungarian troops in support of the Polish military after the German invasion of Poland.

In 1939, he moved back to Hungary but only had his first front command in 1944, when he was also made a general. In 1944, he was also made Commander of the II. Hungarian Reserve Corps stationed in Warsaw. Admiral Horthy clearly instructed Lengyel not to intervene in Polish-German conflict. Therefore, Lengyel refused to attack the Mokotów District when the German General Nikolaus von Vormann ordered him to do so in order to counter the Warsaw Uprising. Lengyel argued that Hungary was not at war with the Poles. In the end, the Germans ordered Lengyel to patrol a terrain that was part of the German siege. This corridor became the only possibility for the Poles to transport munition, food and even soldiers into the city. The Hungarians even supported the Poles with arms, munition and medicine.

After the coup d'état in Romania, the Hungarian commanders ordered the Hungarian troops to return to Hungarian soil and Lengyel returned to Hungary as a commander of the VIII Corps. As he refused to swear allegiance to Ferenc Szálasi, he was dismissed in late 1944. In 1945, he was taken prisoner by the Allies, but the Hungarian courts acquitted him. In the aftermath, Lengyel emigrated to Austria. He died in late 1988 and was buried at a section of the Graz cemetery that mainly contains First World War graves.

== Literature ==
Béla Lengyel, Európa forgószelében: Visszaemlékezések, tapasztalatok és benyomások egy katona életéből [In the Whirlwind of Europe: Memoirs, Experiences, and Impressions from a Soldier's Life], ed. Pál Molitorisz (Digitális Kalamáris, 2011).
