= MC Kemon =

Hungarian footballer

Personal information
- Full name: Wesley Thomas Kemon
- Place of birth: Grenada
- Position: Midfielder

Senior career*
Years	Team	Apps	(Gls)
-2003/04	MTK Budapest	3	(0)
- * Club domestic league appearances and goals

MC Kemon (born in Grenada) is a Hungarian retired footballer.

== Career ==
Kemon started his career with MTK Budapest.
