= Tiszaligeti Stadion =

Multi-purpose stadium in Szolnok, Hungary

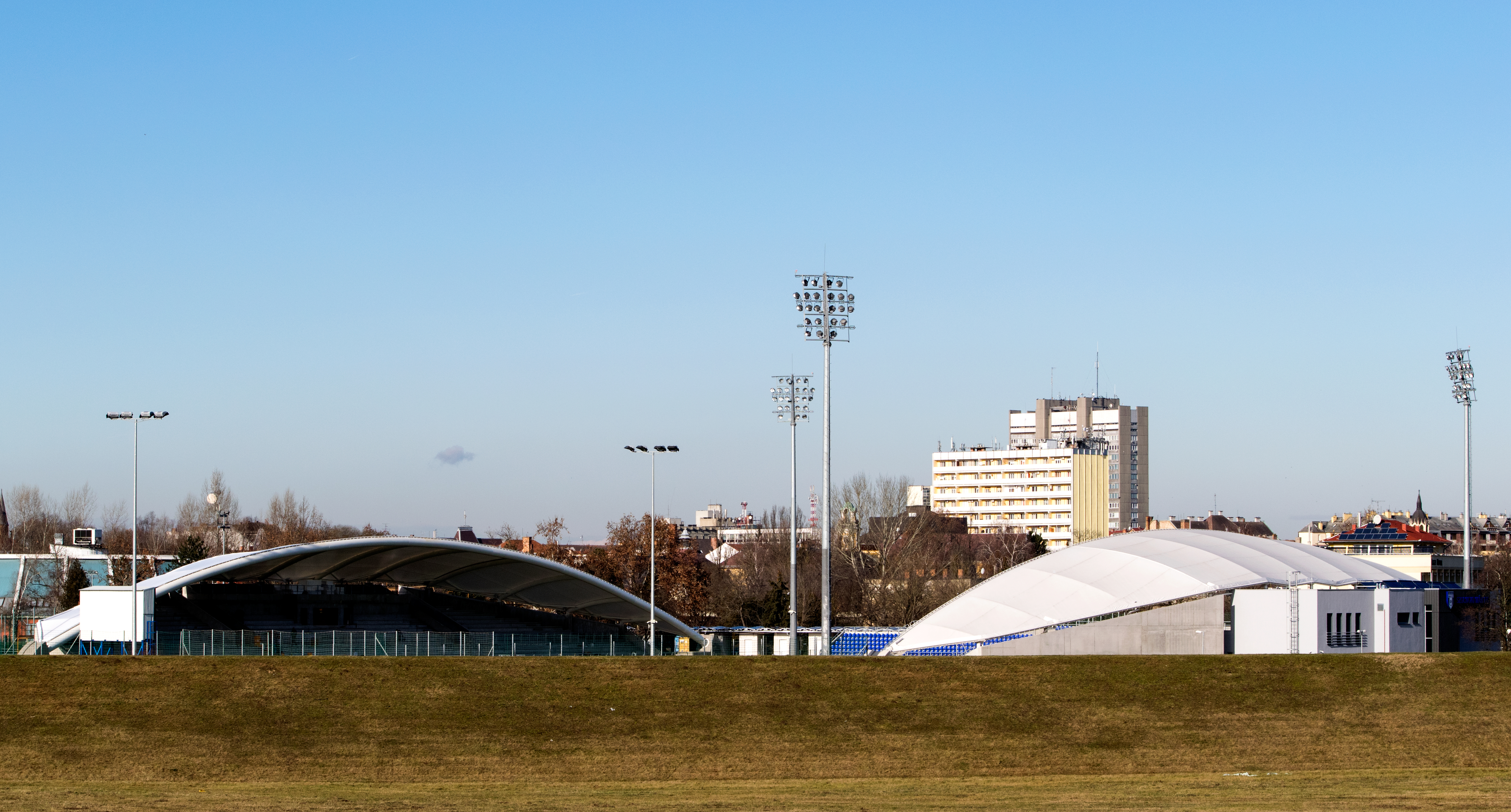
- Interactive map of Tiszaligeti Stadion
- Location: Szolnok, Hungary
- Coordinates: 47°10′5″N 20°11′59″E
- Capacity: 4,000

Tenant
- Szolnoki MÁV FC

Tiszaligeti Stadion, is a multi-purpose stadium in Szolnok, Hungary. It is mainly used mostly for football matches and hosts the home matches of Szolnoki MÁV FC of the Nemzeti Bajnokság I. The stadium has a capacity of 4,000 spectators.
