= Emir Džinović =

Serbian Bosniak footballer

Personal information
- Full name: Emir Džinović
- Date of birth: 6 April 1963 (age 63)
- Place of birth: Priboj, SFR Yugoslavia
- Position: Defender

Senior career*
Years	Team	Apps	(Gls)
1981–1985	Radnički Niš	13	(0)
1987–1989	Čelik Zenica	24	(0)
1992–1993	Szekszárdi		
1994	BVSC-Dreher	17	(0)
1995–1996	Paks		
1996–1997	Diósgyőr		

International career
	Yugoslavia U-21	2	(0)
- * Club domestic league appearances and goals

Emir Džinović (Serbian Cyrillic: Емир Џиновић, born 6 April 1963) is a Serbian Bosniak retired football defender who played in several clubs in Yugoslavia and Hungary.

== Club career ==
Born in Priboj, SR Serbia, back then within Yugoslavia, he played in the Yugoslav First League with Serbian side FK Radnički Niš and Bosnian NK Čelik Zenica.

In 1992 with the beginning of the Yugoslav wars he moved to Hungary and after initially playing with Szekszárdi UFC, he then joined first-level club Budapesti VSC playing with them between the winter-breaks of 1993–94 and 1994–95. Later he also played with Hungarian clubs Paksi FC and Diósgyőri VTK.

== International career ==
Džinović played for Yugoslavia U-21 team.
