= Dragan Gošić =

Serbian footballer

Personal information
- Date of birth: 10 June 1981 (age 45)
- Place of birth: Krupanj, SFR Yugoslavia
- Height: 1.91 m (6 ft 3 in)
- Position: Striker

Senior career*
| Years | Team | Apps | (Gls) |
| 2005–2007 | BSK Borča | | |
| 2007 | Laktaši | 9 | (7) |
| 2008–2009 | Farul Constanța | 30 | (2) |
| 2010 | Kairat | 14 | (2) |
| 2011 | Szolnoki MÁV | 6 | (0) |
| 2011-2012 | Radjevac Krupanj | | |
| 2013 | Budućnost Valjevo | | |
- * Club domestic league appearances and goals

Dragan Gošić (Serbian Cyrillic: Драган Гошић; born 10 June 1981) is a Serbian retired football player who played as a striker.
