= Miloš Jokić =

Serbian footballer

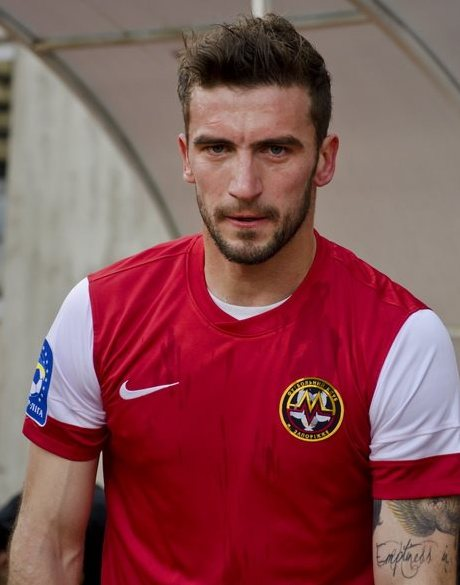

Personal information
- Full name: Miloš Jokić
- Date of birth: June 7, 1987 (age 39)
- Place of birth: Čačak, Serbia
- Height: 1.86 m (6 ft 1 in)
- Position: Midfielder

Team information
- Current team: PAO Koufalia

Senior career*
Years	Team	Apps	(Gls)
2006–2009	Metalac GM	24	(1)
2009	Dinamo Vranje	8	(0)
2009–2010	Olimpik Sarajevo	14	(1)
2010	Čukarički	5	(0)
2010–2011	BASK	11	(1)
2011	Szolnok	13	(1)
2011–2012	Vasas	27	(2)
2012–2014	Metalurh Zaporizhzhia	34	(5)
2015–2017	Lamia	36	(4)
2017–2018	Trikala	8	(0)
2018	Doxa Drama	8	(0)
2018–2019	Dinamo Vranje	4	(0)
2019	Proleter Novi Sad	11	(0)
2019	Kalamata	8	(0)
2020–	PAO Koufalia		
- * Club domestic league appearances and goals as of 16:17, 22 December 2020 (UTC)

Miloš Jokić (Serbian Cyrillic: Милош Јокић; born 7 June 1987) is a professional Serbian footballer who currently plays for PAO Koufalia.
