= Nenad Đurović =

Montenegrin footballer

Personal information
- Full name: Nenad Đurović
- Date of birth: 17 January 1986 (age 40)
- Place of birth: Nikšić, SFR Yugoslavia
- Height: 1.92 m (6 ft 3 1/2 in)
- Position: Center back

Senior career*
Years	Team	Apps	(Gls)
2003–2006	Sutjeska Nikšić	34	(2)
2006–2007	Zeta	18	(1)
2008	Spartak Trnava	3	(0)
2008–2009	Zeta	24	(1)
2009–2010	Inđija	32	(0)
2011	Szolnok	13	(1)
2011	Petrolul Ploiești	3	(0)
2012	Sutjeska Nikšić	20	(0)
2013	Nyíregyháza Spartacus	9	(0)
2013–2014	Sutjeska Nikšić	19	(1)
2015	Mogren	0	(0)

International career^{‡}
- Serbia and Montenegro U19
- Montenegro U21
- * Club domestic league appearances and goals as of 2 June 2014 ‡ National team caps and goals as of 3 September 2012

Nenad Đurović (Cyrillic: Ненад Ђуровић; born 17 January 1986) is a Montenegrin retired football defender who mostly played for Sutjeska Nikšić.

== Club career ==
The first club for which he played for was FK Sutjeska Nikšić from his hometown. He was eventually traded to FK Zeta and played with that team until he made his first career move to a foreign club by signing with Spartak Trnava in January 2008. He played again with FK Zeta before signing with FK Inđija that finished top in the Serbian First League achieving promotion to the Serbian SuperLiga. After playing the first half of the 2010–11 season in Serbia, he moved at winter break to Hungary and signed with Szolnoki MAV FC. In January 2012, after a half season spent with FC Petrolul Ploiești in Romanian Liga I, he returned to FK Sutjeska Nikšić playing now in the Montenegrin First League.

He was part of the Serbia and Montenegro under-19 team at the 2005 UEFA European Under-19 Championship. He also played for the Montenegrin under-21 team.

== Honours ==
Spartak Trnava

- Slovak Cup runners-up: 2008

Inđija

- Serbian First League: 2009–10

Sutjeska

- Montenegrin First League: 2012–13, 2013–14
