= 2019–20 Kisvárda FC season =

Kisvárda FC
2019–20 season
- Chairman: Attila Révész
- Manager: Vasile Miriuță (until 5 October 2019); László Dajka (until 5 February 2020); Tamás Bódog
- Stadium: Várkerti Stadion
- NB 1: 8th
- Hungarian Cup: Round of 32
- Top goalscorer: League: Gheorghe Grozav (7); All: Gheorghe Grozav (8)
- Highest home attendance: 3,308 vs Ferencváros (1 February 2020)
- Lowest home attendance: 815 vs Zalaegerszeg (16 June 2020)
Home colours	Away colours

The 2019–20 season was Kisvárda FC's 2nd season in the OTP Bank Liga and the 17th in existence as a football club.

== First team squad ==
As of 14 August 2019.

Note: Flags indicate national team as defined under FIFA eligibility rules; some limited exceptions apply. Players may hold more than one non-FIFA nationality.

No.	Pos.	Nation	Player
1	GK	ROU	Mihai Minca
3	DF	SRB	Radoš Protić
4	DF	UKR	Anton Kravchenko
5	MF	ROU	Claudiu Bumba
7	FW	BRA	Sassá
8	MF	GRE	Stavros Tsoukalas
9	FW	HUN	Patrik Tischler
10	FW	ROU	Gheorghe Grozav
11	MF	BRA	Lucas (captain)
14	DF	ROU	Cornel Ene
18	DF	UKR	Bohdan Melnyk

No.	Pos.	Nation	Player
21	MF	HUN	András Gosztonyi
22	DF	HUN	Ádám Baranyai
23	FW	HUN	Márk Kovácsréti
26	DF	GRE	Thodoris Berios
30	MF	UKR	Viktor Hey
31	GK	HUN	Illés Zöldesi
33	DF	HUN	Tamás Rubus
36	DF	BRA	Anderson Pico
77	FW	POR	Hugo Seco
84	GK	BRA	Felipe
91	MF	UKR	Roman Karasyuk
93	FW	ROU	Sergiu Negruț

== Transfers ==
=== Summer ===
In: Note: Flags indicate national team as defined under FIFA eligibility rules; some limited exceptions apply. Players may hold more than one non-FIFA nationality.

No.	Pos.	Nation	Player
5	MF	ROU	Claudiu Bumba (from (Turkey) Adanaspor)
9	FW	HUN	Patrik Tischler (from Újpest)
22	DF	HUN	Ádám Baranyai (from Csákvár)
31	GK	HUN	Illés Zöldesi (loan return from Zalaegerszeg)
33	DF	HUN	Tamás Rubus (from Nyíregyháza)
44	DF	UKR	Hrykoriy Zanko (loan return from Cigánd)
—	DF	HUN	Ádám Elek (from Kisvárda U-19)

Out: Note: Flags indicate national team as defined under FIFA eligibility rules; some limited exceptions apply. Players may hold more than one non-FIFA nationality.

No.	Pos.	Nation	Player
5	DF	UKR	Mykhaylo Ryashko
9	FW	HUN	Zoltán Horváth (to Győr)
10	FW	SRB	Brana Ilić (to (Serbia) Inđija)
15	MF	CMR	Patrick Mevoungou
19	MF	HUN	Barnabás Vári (to Győr)
25	DF	HUN	Martin Izing (to Siófok)
28	MF	CRO	Matija Mišić (to Soroksár)
31	GK	UKR	Andriy Cherepko (to (Ukraine) Mynai)
44	DF	UKR	Hrykoriy Zanko (to (Ukraine) Mynai)
87	FW	HUN	Gergely Délczeg (to Dorog)
93	FW	ROU	Sergiu Negruț

=== Winter ===
In: Note: Flags indicate national team as defined under FIFA eligibility rules; some limited exceptions apply. Players may hold more than one non-FIFA nationality.

No.	Pos.	Nation	Player
6	FW	HUN	Richárd Jelena (from Kozármisleny)
12	FW	SRB	Nemanja Obradović (from (Serbia) Spartak Subotica)
19	FW	BRA	Fernando Viana (from (Bulgaria) Botev Plovdiv)
32	GK	HUN	Dávid Dombó (from Mezőkövesd)
45	MF	SRB	Slobodan Simović (from (Belarus) BATE Borisov)
—	DF	ROU	Iasmin Latovlevici (from (Turkey) Bursaspor)

Out: Note: Flags indicate national team as defined under FIFA eligibility rules; some limited exceptions apply. Players may hold more than one non-FIFA nationality.

No.	Pos.	Nation	Player
36	DF	BRA	Anderson Pico (to (Brazil) GE Juventus)
77	FW	POR	Hugo Seco (to (Portugal) Farense)
84	GK	BRA	Felipe (to (Brazil) Botafogo)

== Competitions ==
=== Overview ===
Competition	First match	Last match	Starting round	Final position	Record							
Competition	First match	Last match	Starting round	Final position	Pld	W	D	L	GF	GA	GD	Win %
Nemzeti Bajnokság I	3 August 2019	–	Matchday 1	Matchday 33	14	6	2	6	18	19	−1	42.86
Magyar Kupa	22 September 2019	4 December 2019	Sixth round	Round of 32	3	2	0	1	3	2	+1	66.67
Total					17	8	2	7	21	21	+0	47.06

Last updated: 8 December 2019
Source: Competitions

=== Nemzeti Bajnokság I ===
==== League table ====
Pos	Team	Pld	W	D	L	GF	GA	GD	Pts
6	Újpest	33	12	7	14	45	45	0	43
7	Zalaegerszeg	33	11	10	12	51	44	+7	43
8	Kisvárda	33	12	6	15	42	43	−1	42
9	Diósgyőr	33	12	5	16	40	52	−12	41
10	Paks	33	11	8	14	46	53	−7	41

Source: Hungarian Football Federation (in Hungarian), Soccerway
Rules for classification: 1) Points; 2) Matches won; 3) Goal difference; 4) Goals scored; 5) Head-to-head points; 6) Head-to-head goal difference; 7) Head-to-head away goals scored; 8) Fair play ranking; 9) Drawing of lots.

==== Results summary ====
Overall								Home						Away					
Pld	W	D	L	GF	GA	GD	Pts	W	D	L	GF	GA	GD	W	D	L	GF	GA	GD
33	12	6	15	42	43	−1	42	7	4	5	23	18	+5	5	2	10	19	25	−6

Last updated: 27 June 2020.
Source: NB1

==== Results by round ====
Round	1	2	3	4	5	6	7	8	9	10	11	12	13	14	15	16	17	18	19	20	21	22	23	24	25	26	27	28	29	30	31	32	33
Ground	H	A	A	H	A	H	A	H	A	H	A	A	H	H	A	H	A	H	A	H	A	H	H	A	A	H	A	H	A	H	A	H	A
Result	W	L	W	W	L	L	L	D	W	L	L	D	W	W	L	L	L	L	D	W	L	D	W	L	W	W	L	D	L	L	W	D	W
Position	6	9	5	4	5	6	7	6	5	6	8	8	7	7	7	7	9	9	10	9	9	10	7	8	7	7	7	7	9	10	8	10	8

Updated to match(es) played on 27 June 2020. Source: Matches
A = Away; H = Home; W = Win; D = Draw; L = Loss

==== Matches ====
3 August 2019 1	Kisvárda	1 – 0	Paks	Kisvárda
19:30 CEST	Grozav 79'	Report		Stadium: Várkerti Stadion; Attendance: 2,128; Referee: Gergő Bogár

11 August 2019 2	Debrecen	4 – 1	Kisvárda	Debrecen
18:00 CEST	Szatmári 13'; Varga 26'; Garba 62'; Pávkovics 90+4'	Report	Grozav 28'	Stadium: Nagyerdei Stadion; Attendance: 4,540; Referee: Sándor Andó-Szabó

17 August 2019 3	Budapest Honvéd	1 – 3	Kisvárda	Budapest
19:30 CEST	Ngog 90'	Report	Ene 9'; Lucas 61'; Grozav 90+3'	Stadium: Hidegkuti Nándor Stadion; Attendance: 2,591; Referee: Csaba Pintér

24 August 2019 4	Kisvárda	2 – 0	Újpest	Kisvárda
18:00 CEST	Grozav 23', 74'	Report		Stadium: Várkerti Stadion; Attendance: 2,128; Referee: Gergő Bogár

31 August 2019 5	Fehérvár	3 – 0	Kisvárda	Székesfehérvár
19:30 CEST	Musliu 41'; Milanov 56'; Hodžić 77'	Report		Stadium: MOL Aréna Sóstó; Attendance: 3,679; Referee: Balázs Berke

14 September 2019 6	Kisvárda	1 – 2	Mezőkövesd	Kisvárda
17:00 CEST	Tischler 48'	Report	Zivzivadze 12', 63'	Stadium: Várkerti Stadion; Attendance: 2,520; Referee: Tamás Bognár

29 September 2019 7	Ferencváros	1 – 0	Kisvárda	Budapest
16:00 CEST	Leandro 86'	Report		Stadium: Groupama Arena; Attendance: 7,625; Referee: Zoltán Iványi

5 October 2019 8	Kisvárda	3 – 3	Zalaegerszeg	Kisvárda
17:00 CEST	Grozav 49'; Kravchenko 58'; Tischler 71'	Report	Bedi 26'; Radó 43' (pen.); Babati 84' (pen.)	Stadium: Várkerti Stadion; Attendance: 2,280; Referee: Csaba Pintér

19 October 2019 9	Kaposvár	0 – 2	Kisvárda	Kaposvár
17:00 CEST		Report	Lucas 34'; Gosztonyi 88'	Stadium: Rákóczi Stadion; Attendance: 1,155; Referee: Péter Solymosi

26 October 2019 10	Kisvárda	0 – 1	Puskás Akadémia	Kisvárda
17:00 CEST		Report	Henty 79'	Stadium: Várkerti Stadion; Attendance: 2,684; Referee: Gergő Bogár

2 November 2019 11	Diósgyőr	3 – 1	Kisvárda	Miskolc
17:00 CET	Shestakov 3'; Iszlai 62' (pen.); Rui Pedro 90' (pen.)	Report	Bumba 51'	Stadium: Diósgyőri Stadion; Attendance: 4,268; Referee: Balázs Berke

9 November 2019 12	Paks	1 – 1	Kisvárda	Paks
17:00 CET	Szabó 90+1'	Report	Lucas 88'	Stadium: Fehérvári úti Stadion; Attendance: 1,210; Referee: József Erdős

23 November 2019 13	Kisvárda	1 – 0	Debrecen	Kisvárda
17:00 CET	Kravchenko 13'	Report		Stadium: Várkerti Stadion; Attendance: 2,859; Referee: Zoltán Iványi

30 November 2019 14	Kisvárda	2 – 0	Budapest Honvéd	Kisvárda
17:00 CET	Gosztonyi 14'; Grozav 81'	Report		Stadium: Várkerti Stadion; Attendance: 2,430; Referee: Ádám Farkas

7 December 2019 15	Újpest	1 – 0	Kisvárda	Budapest
17:00 CET	Kravchenko 34' (o.g.)	Report		Stadium: Illovszky Rudolf Stadion; Attendance: 1,446; Referee: Tamás Bognár

14 December 2019 16	Kisvárda	0 – 2	Fehérvár	Kisvárda
17:00 CET		Report	Rubus 41' (o.g.); Pátkai 47'	Stadium: Várkerti Stadion; Attendance: 2,350; Referee: (Hungary) Balázs Berke

25 January 2020 17	Mezőkövesd	1 – 0	Kisvárda	Mezőkövesd
17:00 CET	Nesterov 18'	Report		Stadium: Mezőkövesdi Városi Stadion; Attendance: 1,652; Referee: Péter Solymosi

1 February 2020 18	Kisvárda	1 – 2	Ferencváros	Kisvárda
17:00 CET	Obradović 39'	Report	Boli 29'; Isael 85' (pen.)	Stadium: Várkerti Stadion; Attendance: 3,308; Referee: József Erdős

5 February 2020 19	Zalaegerszeg	1 – 1	Kisvárda	Zalaegerszeg
18:00 CET	Ikoba 77'	Report	Viana 31'	Stadium: ZTE Arena; Attendance: 602; Referee: Sándor Andó-Szabó

8 February 2020 20	Kisvárda	5 – 3	Kaposvár	Kisvárda
17:00 CET	Melnyk 34'; Tischler 60', 65', 82'; Viana 73'	Report	Hegedűs 31'; J. Nagy 50'; Fodor 70'	Stadium: Várkerti Stadion; Attendance: 1,850; Referee: Bence Csonka

15 February 2020 21	Puskás Akadémia	3 – 1	Kisvárda	Felcsút
17:00 CET	Szolnoki 36'; Vaněček 66'; Urblík 75'	Report	Gosztonyi 83'	Stadium: Pancho Aréna; Attendance: 821; Referee: Gergő Bogár

22 February 2020 22	Kisvárda	2 – 2	Diósgyőr	Kisvárda
17:00 CET	Tsoukalas 23'; Melnyk 76'	Report	Molnár 70'; Egerszegi 89'	Stadium: Várkerti Stadion; Attendance: 2,512; Referee: Tamás Bognár

29 February 2020 23	Kisvárda	2 – 0	Paks	Kisvárda
17:00 CET	Sassá 74'; Bumba 82'	Report		Stadium: Várkerti Stadion; Attendance: 2,002; Referee: Sándor Andó-Szabó

7 March 2020 24	Debrecen	1 – 0	Kisvárda	Debrecen
17:00 CET	Varga 50'	Report		Stadium: Nagyerdei Stadion; Attendance: 2,850; Referee: Balázs Berke

14 March 2020 25	Budapest Honvéd	1 – 5	Kisvárda	Budapest
17:00 CET	Lanzafame 52' (pen.)	Report	Sassá 43'; Lucas 44'; Rubus 62'; Tsoukalas 77'; Gosztonyi 83'	Stadium: Illovszky Rudolf Stadion; Attendance: x Referee: István Vad

30 May 2020 26	Kisvárda	1 – 0	Újpest	Kisvárda
16:55 CEST	Bumba 63'	Report		Stadium: Várkerti Stadion; Attendance: 820; Referee: Tamás Bognár

6 June 2020 27	Fehérvár	2 – 0	Kisvárda	Székesfehérvár
19:00 CEST	Négo 16'; Nikolić 87'	Report		Stadium: MOL Aréna Sóstó; Attendance: 1,325; Referee: Sándor Andó-Szabó

9 June 2020 28	Kisvárda	1 – 1	Mezőkövesd	Kisvárda
16:55 CEST	Viana 23'	Report	Nagy 48'	Stadium: Várkerti Stadion; Attendance: 832; Referee: Gergő Bogár

13 June 2020 29	Ferencváros	1 – 0	Kisvárda	Budapest
16:55 CEST	Sigér 75'	Report		Stadium: Groupama Arena; Attendance: 2,123; Referee: Csaba Pintér

16 June 2020 30	Kisvárda	0 – 1	Zalaegerszeg	Kisvárda
19:00 CEST		Report	Radó 83'	Stadium: Várkerti Stadion; Attendance: 815; Referee: Zoltán Iványi

21 June 2020 31	Kaposvár	1 – 2	Kisvárda	Kaposvár
19:00 CEST	Bévárdi 35'	Report	Tsoukalas 21'; Kovácsréti 45'	Stadium: Rákóczi Stadion; Attendance: 995; Referee: Ádám Farkas

24 June 2020 32	Kisvárda	1 – 1	Puskás Akadémia	Kisvárda
19:00 CEST	Sassá 85'	Report	Meißner 90+4'	Stadium: Várkerti Stadion; Attendance: 2,875; Referee: Csaba Pintér

27 June 2020 33	Diósgyőr	0 – 2	Kisvárda	Miskolc
17:30 CEST		Report	Obradović 8'; Viana 42'	Stadium: Diósgyőri Stadion; Attendance: 5,683; Referee: István Vad

=== Hungarian Cup ===
21 September 2019 6th round	Pilis	0 – 1	Kisvárda	Pilis
15:00 CEST		Report	Tischler 77' (pen.)	Stadium: Pilisi Sporttelep; Attendance: 500; Referee: Márton Rúsz

30 October 2019 7th round	Kozármisleny	1 – 2	Kisvárda	Kozármisleny
12:30 CET	Jelena 18'	Report	Hey 12'; Grozav 75'	Stadium: Kozármisleny Stadion; Attendance: 400; Referee: Zoltán J. Kovács

4 December 2019 Round of 32	Pécs	1 – 0	Kisvárda	Pécs
12:00 CET	Tihanyi 65'	Report		Stadium: Stadion PMFC; Attendance: 700; Referee: Attila Molnár

== Statistics ==
=== Appearances and goals ===
Last updated on 27 June 2020.

No.	Pos	Nat	Player	Total		OTP Bank Liga		Hungarian Cup	
No.	Pos	Nat	Player	Apps	Goals	Apps	Goals	Apps	Goals
1	GK	(Romania) ROU	Mihai Mincă	4	-5	3	-5	1	0
2	DF	(Hungary) HUN	Zalán Czene	2	0	2	0	0	0
3	DF	(Serbia) SRB	Radoš Protić	31	0	29	0	2	0
4	DF	(Ukraine) UKR	Anton Kravchenko	18	2	17	2	1	0
5	MF	(Romania) ROU	Claudiu Bumba	26	3	23	3	3	0
6	FW	(Hungary) HUN	Richárd Jelena	4	0	4	0	0	0
7	FW	(Brazil) BRA	Sassá	29	3	27	3	2	0
8	MF	(Greece) GRE	Stavros Tsoukalas	28	3	27	3	1	0
9	FW	(Hungary) HUN	Patrik Tischler	29	6	26	5	3	1
10	FW	(Romania) ROU	Gheorghe Grozav	25	8	23	7	2	1
11	MF	(Brazil) BRA	Lucas	34	4	31	4	3	0
12	FW	(Serbia) SRB	Nemanja Obradović	9	2	9	2	0	0
13	DF	(Hungary) HUN	Roland Bíró	1	0	1	0	0	0
14	DF	(Romania) ROU	Cornel Ene	15	1	14	1	1	0
17	FW	(Ukraine) UKR	Vasyl Khimich	1	0	1	0	0	0
18	MF	(Ukraine) UKR	Bohdan Melnyk	29	2	26	2	3	0
19	FW	(Brazil) BRA	Fernando Viana	15	4	15	4	0	0
21	MF	(Hungary) HUN	András Gosztonyi	26	4	23	4	3	0
22	DF	(Hungary) HUN	Ádám Baranyai	7	0	5	0	2	0
23	FW	(Hungary) HUN	Márk Kovácsréti	25	1	23	1	2	0
26	DF	(Greece) GRE	Thodoris Berios	20	0	18	0	2	0
30	MF	(Ukraine) UKR	Viktor Hey	21	1	19	0	2	1
31	GK	(Hungary) HUN	Illés Zöldesi	4	-5	2	-3	2	-2
32	GK	(Hungary) HUN	Dávid Dombó	16	-20	16	-20	0	0
33	DF	(Hungary) HUN	Tamás Rubus	24	1	23	1	1	0
36	DF	(Ukraine) UKR	Abov Avetisyan	1	0	1	0	0	0
45	MF	(Serbia) SRB	Slobodan Simović	9	0	9	0	0	0
70	MF	(Hungary) HUN	Levente Szőr	2	0	2	0	0	0
91	MF	(Ukraine) UKR	Roman Karasyuk	24	0	22	0	2	0
93	FW	(Ukraine) UKR	Viktor Riznychenko	1	0	1	0	0	0
Youth players:
Players no longer at the club:
36	DF	(Brazil) BRA	Anderson Pico	4	0	1	0	3	0
77	FW	(Portugal) POR	Hugo Seco	14	0	13	0	1	0
84	GK	(Brazil) BRA	Felipe	12	-15	12	-15	0	0
93	FW	(Romania) ROU	Sergiu Negruț	1	0	1	0	0	0

=== Top scorers ===
Includes all competitive matches. The list is sorted by shirt number when total goals are equal.

Last updated on 27 June 2020

Position	Nation	Number	Name	OTP Bank Liga	Hungarian Cup	Total
1	(Romania)	10	Gheorghe Grozav	7	1	8
2	(Hungary)	9	Patrik Tischler	5	1	6
3	(Brazil)	11	Lucas	4	0	4
4	(Hungary)	21	András Gosztonyi	4	0	4
5	(Brazil)	19	Fernando Viana	4	0	4
6	(Romania)	5	Claudiu Bumba	3	0	3
7	(Greece)	8	Stavros Tsoukalas	3	0	3
8	(Brazil)	7	Sassá	3	0	3
9	(Ukraine)	4	Anton Kravchenko	2	0	2
10	(Ukraine)	18	Bohdan Melnyk	2	0	2
11	(Serbia)	12	Nemanja Obradović	2	0	2
12	(Romania)	14	Cornel Ene	1	0	1
13	(Hungary)	33	Tamás Rubus	1	0	1
14	(Hungary)	23	Márk Kovácsréti	1	0	1
15	(Ukraine)	30	Viktor Hey	0	1	1
/	/	/	Own Goals	0	0	0
			TOTALS	42	3	45

=== Disciplinary record ===
Includes all competitive matches. Players with 1 card or more included only.

Last updated on 27 June 2020

Position	Nation	Number	Name	OTP Bank Liga		Hungarian Cup		Total (Hu Total)	
Position	Nation	Number	Name	Booked	Sent off (straight red)	Booked	Sent off (straight red)	Booked	Sent off (straight red)
GK	(Romania)	1	Mihai Mincă	1	0	0	0	1 (1)	0 (0)
DF	(Serbia)	3	Radoš Protić	10	0	0	0	10 (10)	0 (0)
MF	(Ukraine)	4	Anton Kravchenko	2	0	0	0	2 (2)	0 (0)
MF	(Romania)	5	Claudiu Bumba	6	0	0	0	6 (6)	0 (0)
FW	(Brazil)	7	Sassá	3	0	0	0	3 (3)	0 (0)
MF	(Greece)	8	Stavros Tsoukalas	4	1	0	0	4 (4)	1 (1)
FW	(Hungary)	9	Patrik Tischler	2	0	0	0	2 (2)	0 (0)
FW	(Romania)	10	Gheorghe Grozav	4	0	0	0	4 (4)	0 (0)
MF	(Brazil)	11	Lucas	11	0	2	0	13 (11)	0 (0)
FW	(Serbia)	12	Nemanja Obradović	1	0	0	0	1 (1)	0 (0)
DF	(Romania)	14	Cornel Ene	3	1	0	0	3 (3)	1 (1)
MF	(Ukraine)	18	Bohdan Melnyk	8	0	0	0	8 (8)	0 (0)
FW	(Brazil)	19	Fernando Viana	5	0	0	0	5 (5)	0 (0)
MF	(Hungary)	21	András Gosztonyi	3	0	0	0	3 (3)	0 (0)
FW	(Hungary)	23	Márk Kovácsréti	1	1	0	0	1 (1)	1 (1)
DF	(Greece)	26	Thodoris Berios	4	0	0	0	4 (4)	0 (0)
DF	(Ukraine)	30	Viktor Hey	7	0	0	0	7 (7)	0 (0)
GK	(Hungary)	32	Dávid Dombó	1	0	0	0	1 (1)	0 (0)
DF	(Hungary)	33	Tamás Rubus	2	0	0	0	2 (2)	0 (0)
MF	(Serbia)	45	Slobodan Simović	4	1	0	0	4 (4)	1 (1)
MF	(Hungary)	70	Levente Szőr	1	0	0	0	1 (1)	0 (0)
MF	(Portugal)	77	Hugo Seco	4	0	0	0	4 (4)	0 (0)
GK	(Brazil)	84	Felipe	1	0	0	0	1 (1)	0 (0)
MF	(Ukraine)	91	Roman Karasyuk	4	0	0	0	4 (4)	0 (0)
			TOTALS	92	4	2	0	94 (92)	4 (4)

=== Overall ===
Games played	36 (33 OTP Bank Liga and 3 Hungarian Cup)
Games won	14 (12 OTP Bank Liga and 2 Hungarian Cup)
Games drawn	6 (6 OTP Bank Liga and 0 Hungarian Cup)
Games lost	16 (15 OTP Bank Liga and 1 Hungarian Cup)
Goals scored	45
Goals conceded	45
Goal difference	0
Yellow cards	94
Red cards	4
Worst discipline	(Brazil) Lucas (13 (yellow card) , 0 (red card) )
Best result	5–1 (A) v Budapest Honvéd - Nemzeti Bajnokság I - 14-03-2020
Worst result	1–4 (A) v Debrecen - Nemzeti Bajnokság I - 11-08-2019
Worst result	0–3 (A) v Fehérvár - Nemzeti Bajnokság I - 31-08-2019
Most appearances	(Brazil) Lucas (34 appearances)
Top scorer	(Romania) Gheorghe Grozav (8 goals)
Points	48/108 (44.44%)

Last updated: 27 June 2020
