= 2018–19 Kisvárda FC season =

Kisvárda FC
2018–19 season
- Chairman: (Hungary) Attila Révész
- Manager: (Hungary) Elemér Kondás (until 14 August 2018) (Hungary) László Dajka
- NB 1: 9th
- Hungarian Cup: Round of 16
- Top goalscorer: League: Zoltán Horváth (9); All: Zoltán Horváth (10)
- Highest home attendance: 3,385 vs Mezőkövesd (19 May 2019)
- Lowest home attendance: 1,090 vs Puskás Akadémia (1 December 2018)
| Home colours | Away colours |

The 2018–19 season was Kisvárda FC's debut season in the OTP Bank Liga and the 16th in existence as a football club.

== First team squad ==
Note: Flags indicate national team as defined under FIFA eligibility rules; some limited exceptions apply. Players may hold more than one non-FIFA nationality.

| No. | Pos. | Nation | Player |
|---|---|---|---|
| 1 | GK | ROU | Mihai Mincă |
| 3 | DF | SRB | Radoš Protić |
| 4 | DF | UKR | Anton Kravchenko |
| 7 | FW | BRA | Sassá |
| 8 | MF | GRE | Stavros Tsoukalas |
| 9 | FW | HUN | Zoltán Horváth |
| 10 | FW | SRB | Brana Ilić |
| 11 | MF | BRA | Lucas |
| 13 | FW | ROU | Gheorghe Grozav |
| 14 | DF | ROU | Cornel Ene |
| 16 | DF | UKR | Pavlo Lukyanchuk |
| 17 | FW | UKR | Anton Shynder |

| No. | Pos. | Nation | Player |
|---|---|---|---|
| 18 | MF | UKR | Bohdan Melnyk |
| 19 | MF | HUN | Barnabás Vári |
| 21 | MF | HUN | András Gosztonyi |
| 26 | DF | GRE | Thodoris Berios |
| 28 | MF | CRO | Matija Mišić |
| 30 | MF | UKR | Viktor Hey |
| 36 | DF | BRA | Anderson Pico |
| 77 | FW | POR | Hugo Seco |
| 84 | GK | BRA | Felipe |
| 91 | MF | HUN | Roman Karasyuk |
| 93 | FW | ROU | Sergiu Negruț |

== Transfers ==
=== Summer ===
In: Note: Flags indicate national team as defined under FIFA eligibility rules; some limited exceptions apply. Players may hold more than one non-FIFA nationality.

| No. | Pos. | Nation | Player |
|---|---|---|---|
| 1 | GK | ROU | Mihai Mincă (from (Romania) Energeticianul) |
| 7 | FW | BRA | Sassá (from (Brazil) Portuguesa) |
| 14 | DF | ROU | Cornel Ene (from (Romania) Daco-Getica) |
| 16 | DF | UKR | Pavlo Lukyanchuk (loan from (Ukraine) Dynamo Kyiv) |
| 17 | FW | UKR | Anton Shynder (from (Kazakhstan) Tobol) |
| 26 | DF | GRE | Thodoris Berios (from (Greece) Giannina) |
| 29 | MF | SRB | Vuk Mitošević (from (Serbia) Javor Ivanjica) |
| 33 | DF | UKR | Temur Partsvania (from (Ukraine) Olimpik Donetsk) |
| 36 | DF | BRA | Anderson Pico (from (Brazil) São Paulo) |
| 70 | FW | UKR | Artem Milevskyi (from (Belarus) Dinamo Brest) |
| 84 | GK | BRA | Felipe (from (Brazil) Uberlândia) |
| 91 | MF | UKR | Roman Karasyuk (from (Ukraine) Veres Rivne) |
| 93 | FW | ROU | Sergiu Negruț (from (Bulgaria) Beroe) |
| — | FW | HUN | Ferenc Rácz (from Balmazújváros) |

Out: Note: Flags indicate national team as defined under FIFA eligibility rules; some limited exceptions apply. Players may hold more than one non-FIFA nationality.

| No. | Pos. | Nation | Player |
|---|---|---|---|
| 1 | GK | HUN | Illés Zöldesi (loan return to Videoton) |
| 3 | DF | HUN | Krisztián Vermes (to Unione) |
| 3 | DF | UKR | Robert Molnar (to Soroksár) |
| 7 | MF | HUN | Norbert Heffler (to Gyirmót) |
| 8 | MF | CZE | Marek Střeštík (to Gyirmót) |
| 12 | GK | HUN | Tamás Molnár-Farkas (to Szolnok) |
| 15 | DF | HUN | Barna Papucsek (to Balmazújváros) |
| 17 | DF | HUN | Sergiu Oltean (to Kazincbarcika) |
| 17 | FW | UKR | Anton Shynder |
| 20 | MF | HUN | Gergő Oláh (to Szeged) |
| 22 | MF | UKR | Yuriy Toma (to Kazincbarcika) |
| 44 | DF | UKR | Grygoriy Zanko (loan to Cigánd) |
| 87 | FW | HUN | Gergely Délczeg |
| 88 | FW | ROU | Raymond Lukács (to Kazincbarcika) |

=== Winter ===
In: Note: Flags indicate national team as defined under FIFA eligibility rules; some limited exceptions apply. Players may hold more than one non-FIFA nationality.

| No. | Pos. | Nation | Player |
|---|---|---|---|
| 4 | DF | UKR | Anton Kravchenko (from (Ukraine) Olimpik Donetsk) |
| 6 | MF | GRE | Stavros Tsoukalas (from (Greece) Apollon Smyrni) |
| 13 | MF | ROU | Gheorghe Grozav (from (Romania) Dinamo București) |
| 77 | FW | POR | Hugo Seco (from (Kazakhstan) Irtysh Pavlodar) |

Out: Note: Flags indicate national team as defined under FIFA eligibility rules; some limited exceptions apply. Players may hold more than one non-FIFA nationality.

| No. | Pos. | Nation | Player |
|---|---|---|---|
| 4 | DF | HUN | Gábor Jánvári (to Siófok) |
| 25 | DF | HUN | Martin Izing (loan to Siófok) |
| 29 | MF | SRB | Vuk Mitošević (to (Serbia) Vojvodina) |
| 32 | MF | HUN | Ferenc Rácz |
| 33 | DF | UKR | Temur Partsvania |
| 70 | FW | UKR | Artem Milevskyi (to (Belarus) Dinamo Brest) |

== Statistics ==
=== Appearances and goals ===
Last updated on 26 May 2019.

| No. | Pos | Nat | Player | Total | | OTP Bank Liga | | Hungarian Cup | |
| No. | Pos | Nat | Player | Apps | Goals | Apps | Goals | Apps | Goals |
|---|---|---|---|---|---|---|---|---|---|
| 1 | GK | (Romania) ROU | Mihai Mincă | 6 | -7 | 1 | -3 | 5 | -4 |
| 3 | DF | (Serbia) SRB | Radoš Protić | 28 | 0 | 24 | 0 | 4 | 0 |
| 4 | DF | (Ukraine) UKR | Anton Kravchenko | 15 | 1 | 14 | 1 | 1 | 0 |
| 7 | FW | (Brazil) BRA | Sassá | 27 | 2 | 24 | 2 | 3 | 0 |
| 8 | MF | (Greece) GRE | Stavros Tsoukalas | 17 | 4 | 15 | 4 | 2 | 0 |
| 9 | FW | (Hungary) HUN | Zoltán Horváth | 32 | 10 | 30 | 9 | 2 | 1 |
| 10 | FW | (Serbia) SRB | Brana Ilić | 35 | 6 | 30 | 4 | 5 | 2 |
| 11 | MF | (Brazil) BRA | Lucas | 34 | 2 | 31 | 2 | 3 | 0 |
| 13 | MF | (Romania) ROU | Gheorghe Grozav | 16 | 6 | 14 | 5 | 2 | 1 |
| 14 | DF | (Romania) ROU | Cornel Ene | 22 | 0 | 21 | 0 | 1 | 0 |
| 16 | DF | (Ukraine) UKR | Pavlo Lukyanchuk | 15 | 1 | 13 | 1 | 2 | 0 |
| 17 | FW | (Ukraine) UKR | Anton Shynder | 2 | 0 | 2 | 0 | 0 | 0 |
| 18 | MF | (Ukraine) UKR | Bohdan Melnyk | 27 | 1 | 24 | 1 | 3 | 0 |
| 19 | MF | (Hungary) HUN | Barnabás Vári | 24 | 3 | 23 | 3 | 1 | 0 |
| 21 | MF | (Hungary) HUN | András Gosztonyi | 32 | 3 | 29 | 1 | 3 | 2 |
| 26 | DF | (Greece) GRE | Thodoris Berios | 26 | 0 | 22 | 0 | 4 | 0 |
| 28 | MF | (Croatia) CRO | Matija Mišić | 15 | 1 | 13 | 1 | 2 | 0 |
| 30 | MF | (Ukraine) UKR | Viktor Hey | 6 | 0 | 5 | 0 | 1 | 0 |
| 36 | DF | (Brazil) BRA | Anderson Pico | 13 | 0 | 11 | 0 | 2 | 0 |
| 77 | FW | (Portugal) POR | Hugo Seco | 14 | 1 | 13 | 1 | 1 | 0 |
| 84 | GK | (Brazil) BRA | Felipe | 32 | -45 | 32 | -45 | 0 | 0 |
| 91 | MF | (Ukraine) UKR | Roman Karasyuk | 35 | 0 | 30 | 0 | 5 | 0 |
| 93 | FW | (Romania) ROU | Sergiu Negruț | 16 | 4 | 12 | 0 | 4 | 4 |
Youth players:
| 17 | FW | (Hungary) HUN | Tamás Gyüre | 1 | 0 | 0 | 0 | 1 | 0 |
| 23 | FW | (Hungary) HUN | Márk Kovácsréti | 4 | 0 | 0 | 0 | 4 | 0 |
Out to loan:
| 25 | DF | (Hungary) HUN | Martin Izing | 8 | 0 | 5 | 0 | 3 | 0 |
Players no longer at the club:
| 4 | DF | (Hungary) HUN | Gábor Jánvári | 2 | 0 | 2 | 0 | 0 | 0 |
| 29 | MF | (Serbia) SRB | Vuk Mitošević | 10 | 0 | 8 | 0 | 2 | 0 |
| 32 | MF | (Hungary) HUN | Ferenc Rácz | 1 | 0 | 0 | 0 | 1 | 0 |
| 33 | DF | (Ukraine) UKR | Temur Partsvania | 5 | 0 | 4 | 0 | 1 | 0 |
| 70 | FW | (Ukraine) UKR | Artem Milevskyi | 9 | 0 | 7 | 0 | 2 | 0 |

=== Top scorers ===
Includes all competitive matches. The list is sorted by shirt number when total goals are equal.

Last updated on 26 May 2019

| Position | Nation | Number | Name | OTP Bank Liga | Hungarian Cup | Total |
|---|---|---|---|---|---|---|
| 1 | (Hungary) | 9 | Zoltán Horváth | 9 | 1 | 10 |
| 2 | (Romania) | 13 | Gheorghe Grozav | 5 | 1 | 6 |
| 3 | (Serbia) | 10 | Brana Ilić | 4 | 2 | 6 |
| 4 | (Greece) | 8 | Stavros Tsoukalas | 4 | 0 | 4 |
| 5 | (Romania) | 93 | Sergiu Negruț | 0 | 4 | 4 |
| 6 | (Hungary) | 19 | Barnabás Vári | 3 | 0 | 3 |
| 7 | (Hungary) | 21 | András Gosztonyi | 1 | 2 | 3 |
| 8 | (Brazil) | 11 | Lucas | 2 | 0 | 2 |
| 9 | (Brazil) | 7 | Sassá | 2 | 0 | 2 |
| 10 | (Croatia) | 28 | Matija Mišić | 1 | 0 | 1 |
| 11 | (Ukraine) | 16 | Pavlo Lukyanchuk | 1 | 0 | 1 |
| 12 | (Ukraine) | 4 | Anton Kravchenko | 1 | 0 | 1 |
| 13 | (Ukraine) | 18 | Bohdan Melnyk | 1 | 0 | 1 |
| 14 | (Portugal) | 77 | Hugo Seco | 1 | 0 | 1 |
| / | / | / | Own Goals | 1 | 0 | 1 |
| | | | TOTALS | 36 | 10 | 46 |

=== Disciplinary record ===
Includes all competitive matches. Players with 1 card or more included only.

Last updated on 26 May 2019

| Position | Nation | Number | Name | OTP Bank Liga | | Hungarian Cup | | Total (Hu Total) | |
| Position | Nation | Number | Name | Booked | Sent off (straight red) | Booked | Sent off (straight red) | Booked | Sent off (straight red) |
| DF | (Serbia) | 3 | Radoš Protić | 7 | 0 | 2 | 0 | 9 (7) | 0 (0) |
| DF | (Ukraine) | 4 | Anton Kravchenko | 4 | 0 | 1 | 0 | 5 (4) | 0 (0) |
| FW | (Brazil) | 7 | Sassá | 3 | 0 | 0 | 0 | 3 (3) | 0 (0) |
| MF | (Greece) | 8 | Stavros Tsoukalas | 2 | 0 | 0 | 0 | 2 (2) | 0 (0) |
| FW | (Hungary) | 9 | Zoltán Horváth | 5 | 0 | 0 | 0 | 5 (5) | 0 (0) |
| FW | (Serbia) | 10 | Brana Ilić | 2 | 0 | 0 | 0 | 2 (2) | 0 (0) |
| MF | (Brazil) | 11 | Lucas | 11 | 0 | 2 | 0 | 13 (11) | 0 (0) |
| FW | (Romania) | 13 | Gheorghe Grozav | 3 | 0 | 0 | 0 | 3 (3) | 0 (0) |
| DF | (Romania) | 14 | Cornel Ene | 5 | 0 | 0 | 0 | 5 (5) | 0 (0) |
| DF | (Ukraine) | 16 | Pavlo Lukyanchuk | 4 | 2 | 0 | 0 | 4 (4) | 2 (2) |
| FW | (Ukraine) | 17 | Anton Shynder | 0 | 1 | 0 | 0 | 0 (0) | 1 (1) |
| MF | (Ukraine) | 18 | Bohdan Melnyk | 2 | 0 | 1 | 0 | 3 (2) | 0 (0) |
| MF | (Hungary) | 19 | Barnabás Vári | 6 | 1 | 0 | 0 | 6 (6) | 1 (1) |
| MF | (Hungary) | 21 | András Gosztonyi | 6 | 0 | 0 | 0 | 6 (6) | 0 (0) |
| FW | (Hungary) | 23 | Márk Kovácsréti | 0 | 0 | 1 | 0 | 1 (0) | 0 (0) |
| DF | (Greece) | 26 | Thodoris Berios | 10 | 1 | 1 | 0 | 11 (10) | 1 (1) |
| MF | (Croatia) | 28 | Matija Mišić | 2 | 0 | 1 | 0 | 3 (2) | 0 (0) |
| MF | (Serbia) | 29 | Vuk Mitošević | 0 | 0 | 1 | 0 | 1 (0) | 0 (0) |
| DF | (Brazil) | 36 | Anderson Pico | 2 | 0 | 0 | 0 | 2 (2) | 0 (0) |
| FW | (Ukraine) | 70 | Artem Milevskyi | 2 | 0 | 0 | 0 | 2 (2) | 0 (0) |
| FW | (Portugal) | 77 | Hugo Seco | 4 | 0 | 0 | 0 | 4 (4) | 0 (0) |
| GK | (Brazil) | 84 | Felipe | 4 | 0 | 0 | 0 | 4 (4) | 0 (0) |
| MF | (Ukraine) | 91 | Roman Karasyuk | 3 | 0 | 1 | 0 | 4 (3) | 0 (0) |
| | | | TOTALS | 87 | 5 | 11 | 0 | 97 (87) | 5 (5) |

=== Overall ===
| Games played | 38 (33 OTP Bank Liga and 5 Hungarian Cup) |
| Games won | 13 (10 OTP Bank Liga and 3 Hungarian Cup) |
| Games drawn | 9 (8 OTP Bank Liga and 1 Hungarian Cup) |
| Games lost | 16 (15 OTP Bank Liga and 1 Hungarian Cup) |
| Goals scored | 46 |
| Goals conceded | 52 |
| Goal difference | -6 |
| Yellow cards | 97 |
| Red cards | 5 |
| Worst discipline | (Brazil) Lucas (13 (yellow card) , 0 (red card) ) |
| Worst discipline | (Greece) Thodoris Berios (11 (yellow card) , 1 (red card) ) |
| Best result | 4–0 (A) v Gyöngyös - Magyar Kupa - 31-10-2018 |
| Best result | 4–0 (A) v Puskás Akadémia - Nemzeti Bajnokság I - 06-04-2019 |
| Worst result | 0–4 (A) v MOL Vidi - Nemzeti Bajnokság I - 21-07-2018 |
| Worst result | 0–4 (A) v Budapest Honvéd - Nemzeti Bajnokság I - 29-07-2018 |
| Most appearances | (Serbia) Brana Ilić (35 appearances) |
| Most appearances | (Ukraine) Roman Karasyuk (35 appearances) |
| Top scorer | (Hungary) Zoltán Horváth (10 goals) |
| Points | 48/114 (42.1%) |

Last updated: 26 May 2019

== Nemzeti Bajnokság I ==
=== Matches ===
| 21 July 2018 1 | MOL Vidi | 4 – 0 | Kisvárda | Felcsút, Fejér County |
| 20:15 CEST | Lazović 16'; M. Šćepović 36'; Juhász 44'; S. Šćepović 90+2' | Report | | Stadium: Pancho Arena; Attendance: 1,744; Referee: (Hungary) Tamás Bognár |

| 29 July 2018 2 | Budapest Honvéd | 4 – 0 | Kisvárda | Budapest, Pest County |
| 18:00 CEST | Danilo 24' (pen.); Jánvári 72' (o.g.); Gazdag 85'; Lukács 90+1' | Report | | Stadium: Bozsik Stadion; Attendance: 1,774; Referee: (Hungary) Ádám Farkas |

| 5 August 2018 3 | Újpest | 1 – 0 | Kisvárda | Budapest, Pest County |
| 18:00 CEST | Diallo 66' | Report | | Stadium: Szusza Ferenc Stadion; Attendance: 2,029; Referee: (Hungary) Sándor Andó-Szabó |

| 11 August 2018 4 | Kisvárda | 0 – 2 | Ferencváros | Kisvárda, Szabolcs-Szatmár-Bereg County |
| 19:30 CEST | | Report | Leandro 55'; Lanzafame 75' (pen.) | Stadium: Várkert Stadium; Attendance: 2,850; Referee: (Hungary) Csaba Pintér |

| 18 August 2018 5 | Puskás Akadémia | 1 – 1 | Kisvárda | Felcsút, Fejér County |
| 19:30 CEST | Knežević 58' | Report | Lucas 77' | Stadium: Pancho Arena; Attendance: 589; Referee: (Hungary) Viktor Kassai |

| 25 August 2018 6 | Kisvárda | 1 – 1 | Diósgyőr | Kisvárda, Szabolcs-Szatmár-Bereg County |
| 19:30 CEST | Vári 51' (pen.) | Report | Mihajlović 41' | Stadium: Várkert Sportpálya; Attendance: 2,137; Referee: (Hungary) Gergely Szőts |

| 1 September 2018 7 | MTK Budapest | 0 – 1 | Kisvárda | Budapest, Pest County |
| 19:30 CEST | | Report | Vári 36' (pen.) | Stadium: Hidegkuti Nándor Stadion; Attendance: 1,632; Referee: (Hungary) Péter Solymosi |

| 15 September 2018 8 | Kisvárda | 4 – 1 | Szombathelyi Haladás | Kisvárda, Szabolcs-Szatmár-Bereg County |
| 17:00 CEST | Ilić 18' 69'; Horváth Z. 29'; Mišić 57' | (Report) | Priskin 66' | Stadium: Várkert Sportpálya; Attendance: 1,983; Referee: (Hungary) Ádám Németh |

| 29 September 2018 9 | Debrecen | 3 – 1 | Kisvárda | Debrecen, Hajdú-Bihar County |
| 17:00 CEST | Takács 55', 84'; Barna 65' | Report | Horváth 9' | Stadium: Nagyerdei Stadion; Attendance: 2,826; Referee: (Hungary) Viktor Kassai |

| 6 October 2018 10 | Paks | 4 – 1 | Kisvárda | Paks, Tolna County |
| 17:00 CEST | Hahn 16'; Remili 19'; Gévay 42', 90+2' | Report | Horváth 9' | Stadium: Fehérvári úti Stadion; Attendance: 600; Referee: (Hungary) Ádám Radványi |

| 20 October 2018 11 | Kisvárda | 1 – 2 | Mezőkövesd | Kisvárda, Szabolcs-Szatmár-Bereg County |
| 17:00 CEST | Vári 13' | (Report) | Molnár 66', 79' | Stadium: Várkert Sportpálya; Attendance: 1,910; Referee: (Hungary) Zoltán Iványi |

| 28 October 2018 12 | Kisvárda | 2 – 2 | MOL Vidi | Kisvárda, Szabolcs-Szatmár-Bereg County |
| 17:00 CEST | Sassá 26'; Stopira 74' (o.g.) | (Report) | Nego 19' (pen.); Pátkai 39' | Stadium: Várkert Sportpálya; Attendance: 2,232; Referee: (Hungary) István Vad |

| 3 November 2018 13 | Kisvárda | 0 – 3 | Budapest Honvéd | Kisvárda, Szabolcs-Szatmár-Bereg County |
| 17:00 CET | | Report | Holender 32', 69'; Ngog 78' | Stadium: Várkert Sportpálya; Attendance: 2,685; Referee: (Hungary) Péter Solymosi |

| 10 November 2018 14 | Kisvárda | 1 – 4 | Újpest | Kisvárda, Szabolcs-Szatmár-Bereg County |
| 17:00 CET | Lucas 31' | Report | Novothny 42', 73', 86'; Izing 50' (o.g.) | Stadium: Várkert Sportpálya; Attendance: 2,280; Referee: (Hungary) Ádám Németh |

| 24 November 2018 15 | Ferencváros | 2 – 0 | Kisvárda | Budapest, Pest County |
| 17:00 CET | Frimpong 21'; Blažič 33' | Report | | Stadium: Groupama Arena; Attendance: 7,543; Referee: (Hungary) István Vad |

| 1 December 2018 16 | Kisvárda | 1 – 0 | Puskás Akadémia | Kisvárda, Szabolcs-Szatmár-Bereg County |
| 17:00 CET | Horváth 35' | Report | | Stadium: Várkert Sportpálya; Attendance: 1,090; Referee: (Hungary) Zoltán Iványi |

| 8 December 2018 17 | Diósgyőr | 1 – 1 | Kisvárda | Miskolc, Borsod-Abaúj-Zemplén County |
| 17:00 CET | Juhar 14' | Report | Sassá 32' | Stadium: DVTK Stadion; Attendance: 2,214; Referee: (Hungary) Balázs Berke |

| 15 December 2018 18 | Kisvárda | 1 – 0 | MTK Budapest | Kisvárda, Szabolcs-Szatmár-Bereg County |
| 17:00 CET | Ilić 76' | Report | | Stadium: Várkert Sportpálya; Attendance: 1,174; Referee: (Hungary) Ádám Radványi |

| 2 February 2019 19 | Szombathelyi Haladás | 0 – 1 | Kisvárda | Szombathely, Vas County |
| 17:00 CET | | Report | Horváth 51' | Stadium: Haladás Sportkomplexum; Attendance: 2,512; Referee: (Hungary) Gergő Bogár |

| 9 February 2019 20 | Kisvárda | 3 – 0 | Debrecen | Kisvárda, Szabolcs-Szatmár-Bereg County |
| 17:00 CET | Tsoukalas 42'; Lukyanchuk 45'; Horváth 55' | Report | | Stadium: Várkert Sportpálya; Attendance: 1,542; Referee: (Hungary) Viktor Kassai |

| 16 February 2019 21 | Kisvárda | 0 – 0 | Paks | Kisvárda, Szabolcs-Szatmár-Bereg County |
| 17:00 CET | | Report | | Stadium: Várkert Sportpálya; Attendance: 2,007; Referee: (Hungary) Ádám Farkas |

| 23 February 2019 22 | Mezőkövesd | 2 – 2 | Kisvárda | Mezőkövesd, Borsod-Abaúj-Zemplén County |
| 17:00 CET | Cseri 24' (pen.); Tsoukalas 63' (o.g.) | Report | Tsoukalas 9'; Kravchenko 14' | Stadium: Mezőkövesdi Városi Stadion; Attendance: 2,512; Referee: (Hungary) Péter Solymosi |

| 2 March 2019 23 | MOL Vidi | 2 – 1 | Kisvárda | Székesfehérvár, Fejér County |
| 17:00 CET | Kovács 59'; Hodžić 70' | Report | Ilić 32' | Stadium: MOL Aréna Sóstó; Attendance: 1,975; Referee: (Hungary) Balázs Berke |

| 9 March 2019 24 | Kisvárda | 1 – 1 | Budapest Honvéd | Kisvárda, Szabolcs-Szatmár-Bereg County |
| 17:00 CET | Grozav 28' | Report | Danilo 46' | Stadium: Várkert Sportpálya; Attendance: 2,110; Referee: (Hungary) Péter Solymosi |

| 16 March 2019 25 | Újpest | 1 – 0 | Kisvárda | Budapest, Pest County |
| 17:00 CET | Traoré 23' (pen.) | Report | | Stadium: Szusza Ferenc Stadion; Attendance: 2,090; Referee: (Hungary) József Erdős |

| 30 March 2019 26 | Kisvárda | 0 – 1 | Ferencváros | Kisvárda, Szabolcs-Szatmár-Bereg County |
| 17:00 CEST | | Report | Signevich 48' | Stadium: Várkert Stadium; Attendance: 3,331; Referee: (Hungary) Zoltán Iványi |

| 6 April 2019 27 | Puskás Akadémia | 0 – 4 | Kisvárda | Felcsút, Fejér County |
| 17:00 CEST | | Report | Gosztonyi 19'; Grozav 31'; Melnyk 55'; Horváth 71' (pen.) | Stadium: Pancho Arena; Attendance: 700; Referee: (Hungary) Sándor Andó-Szabó |

| 13 April 2019 28 | Kisvárda | 1 – 1 | Diósgyőr | Kisvárda, Szabolcs-Szatmár-Bereg County |
| 17:00 CEST | Seco 90+1' | Report | Lucas 20' (o.g.) | Stadium: Várkert Sportpálya; Attendance: 2,850; Referee: (Hungary) István Vad |

| 20 April 2019 29 | MTK Budapest | 0 – 1 | Kisvárda | Budapest, Pest County |
| 17:00 CEST | | Report | Horváth 20' | Stadium: Hidegkuti Nándor Stadion; Attendance: 1,819; Referee: (Hungary) Péter Solymosi |

| 27 April 2019 30 | Kisvárda | 1 – 2 | Szombathelyi Haladás | Kisvárda, Szabolcs-Szatmár-Bereg County |
| 17:00 CEST | Grozav 11' | Report | Priskin 24' (pen.); Rui Pedro 28' | Stadium: Várkert Sportpálya; Attendance: 2,620; Referee: (Hungary) József Erdős |

| 4 May 2019 31 | Debrecen | 1 – 3 | Kisvárda | Debrecen, Hajdú-Bihar County |
| 17:00 CEST | Szécsi 40' | Report | Grozav 55' (pen.), 74'; Horváth 90+4' | Stadium: Nagyerdei Stadion; Attendance: 3,500; Referee: (Hungary) Gergő Bogár |

| 11 May 2019 32 | Paks | 1 – 0 | Kisvárda | Paks, Tolna County |
| 17:00 CEST | Könyves 73' | Report | | Stadium: Fehérvári úti Stadion; Attendance: 1,702; Referee: (Hungary) Sándor Andó-Szabó |

| 19 May 2019 33 | Kisvárda | 2 – 1 | Mezőkövesd | Kisvárda, Szabolcs-Szatmár-Bereg County |
| 17:00 CEST | Tsoukalas 26', 59' | Report | Dragóner 87' | Stadium: Várkert Sportpálya; Attendance: 3,385; Referee: (Hungary) Viktor Kassai |

=== League table ===
| Pos | Team | Pld | W | D | L | GF | GA | GD | Pts | Qualification or relegation |
|---|---|---|---|---|---|---|---|---|---|---|
| 7 | Puskás Akadémia | 33 | 11 | 7 | 15 | 36 | 45 | −9 | 40 | |
| 8 | Paks | 33 | 9 | 12 | 12 | 33 | 46 | −13 | 39 | |
| 9 | Kisvárda | 33 | 10 | 8 | 15 | 36 | 48 | −12 | 38 | |
| 10 | Diósgyőr | 33 | 10 | 8 | 15 | 36 | 57 | −21 | 38 | |
| 11 | MTK (R) | 33 | 10 | 4 | 19 | 42 | 56 | −14 | 34 | Relegation to the Nemzeti Bajnokság II |

Source: Hungarian Football Federation (in Hungarian), Soccerway
Rules for classification: 1) Points; 2) Matches won; 3) Goal difference; 4) Goals scored; 5) Head-to-head points; 6) Head-to-head goal difference; 7) Head-to-head away goals scored; 8) Fair play ranking; 9) Drawing of lots.
(R) Relegated

=== Results summary ===
| Overall | | | | | | | | Home | | | | | | Away | | | | | |
| Pld | W | D | L | GF | GA | GD | Pts | W | D | L | GF | GA | GD | W | D | L | GF | GA | GD |
|---|---|---|---|---|---|---|---|---|---|---|---|---|---|---|---|---|---|---|---|
| 33 | 10 | 8 | 15 | 36 | 48 | −12 | 38 | 5 | 5 | 6 | 19 | 21 | −2 | 5 | 3 | 9 | 17 | 27 | −10 |

Last updated: 26 May 2019.
Source: NB1

=== Results by round ===
| Round | 1 | 2 | 3 | 4 | 5 | 6 | 7 | 8 | 9 | 10 | 11 | 12 | 13 | 14 | 15 | 16 | 17 | 18 | 19 | 20 | 21 | 22 | 23 | 24 | 25 | 26 | 27 | 28 | 29 | 30 | 31 | 32 | 33 |
|---|---|---|---|---|---|---|---|---|---|---|---|---|---|---|---|---|---|---|---|---|---|---|---|---|---|---|---|---|---|---|---|---|---|
| Ground | A | A | A | H | A | H | A | H | A | A | H | H | H | H | A | H | A | H | A | H | H | A | A | H | A | H | A | H | A | H | A | A | H |
| Result | L | L | L | L | D | D | W | W | L | L | L | D | L | L | L | W | D | W | W | W | D | D | L | D | L | L | W | D | W | L | W | L | W |
| Position | 12 | 12 | 12 | 12 | 12 | 12 | 11 | 9 | 10 | 10 | 10 | 10 | 10 | 11 | 11 | 11 | 11 | 11 | 10 | 10 | 11 | 11 | 10 | 11 | 11 | 11 | 10 | 10 | 9 | 10 | 9 | 9 | 9 |

Updated to match(es) played on 26 May 2019. Source: Matches
A = Away; H = Home; W = Win; D = Draw; L = Loss

== Hungarian Cup ==
| 23 September 2018 Round 6 | Szolnok | 0 – 1 | Kisvárda | Szolnok, Jász-Nagykun-Szolnok County |
| 15:00 CEST | | Report | Negruț 10' | Stadium: Tiszaligeti Stadion; Attendance: 1,100; Referee: (Hungary) Gábor Oláh |

| 31 October 2018 Round 7 | Gyöngyös | 0 – 4 | Kisvárda | Gyöngyös, Heves County |
| 12:30 CET | | Report | Gosztonyi 11', 26'; Negruț 21', 49' | Stadium: Kömlei Károly Sporttelep; Attendance: 1,100; Referee: (Hungary) Balázs Böcskei |

| 4 December 2018 Round of 32 | Szentlőrinc | 1 – 4 (a.e.t.) | Kisvárda | Szentlőrinc, Baranya County |
| 12:00 CET | Hleba 58' | Report | Ilić 90+1', 108'; Horváth 105'; Negruț 109' | Stadium: Szentlőrinc Sporttelep; Referee: (Hungary) Gergely Kovács |

| 20 February 2019 Round of 16 (leg 1) | Ferencváros | 2 – 0 | Kisvárda | Budapest, Pest County |
| 18:00 CET | Lanzafame 54'; Böde 86' | Report | | Stadium: Groupama Arena; Attendance: 3,447; Referee: (Hungary) Csaba Pintér |

| 26 February 2019 Round of 16 (leg 2) | Kisvárda | 1 – 1 (1 – 3 agg.) | Ferencváros | Kisvárda, Szabolcs-Szatmár-Bereg County |
| 20:00 CET | Grozav 67' (pen.) | Report | Gorriarán 33' | Stadium: Várkert Sportpálya; Attendance: 1,752; Referee: (Hungary) Róbert Nagy |
