= Zalan =

Zalan may refer to:

== Places ==
- Zalan-e Olya, a village in Iran
- Zălan, a village in Romania
- Zalan, Republic of Buryatia, a rural locality in Russia

== Other uses ==
- Zalan (duke), 9th-century nobleman
- Zalan FC, South Sudanese football club
- Zalán (given name), a Hungarian name
