= Péter Kozma =

Péter Kozma may refer to:

- Péter Kozma (politician) (1959–2017), Hungarian politician
- Péter Kozma (skier) (1961–2023), Swiss-Hungarian alpine skier, Olympian, visual artist, and light artist
