= Zalán =

Zalán may refer to:

- Zalán or Zălan, a village part of Bodoc, Covasna, Romania
- Zalán (given name), Hungarian masculine name
