= Gabriella Juhász =

Hungarian handball player (born 1985)

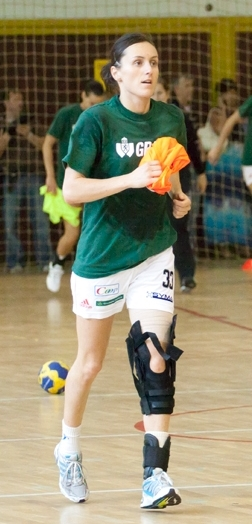
- Juhász in 2011

Personal information
- Full name: Gabriella Juhász
- Nationality: Hungarian
- Born: 19 March 1985 (age 41) Kisvárda, Hungary
- Height: 1.70 m (5 ft 7 in)

Sport
- Sport: Handball
- Position: Left Wing, Playmaker

Senior clubs
- Years: Team
- 2001–2003: DVSC
- 2003–2007: Győri ETO KC
- 2007–2008: Ferencvárosi TC
- 2008–2009: CS Rulmentul Braşov
- 2009–2011: DVSC
- 2011–2012: Veszprém Barabás KC
- 2012–2013: Levanger HK
- 2013–2015: Fredrikstad BK
- 2015–2020: Storhamar HE
National team
Years	Team	Apps	(Gls)
2007–2011	Hungary	19	(32)

Gabriella Juhász (born 19 March 1985) is a retired Hungarian handballer.

Juhász made her international debut on 3 March 2007 against Norway, and participated on the 2009 World Championship.

== Achievements ==
- Nemzeti Bajnokság I:
  - Winner: 2005, 2006
  - Silver Medallist: 2004, 2007, 2010, 2011
  - Bronze Medallist: 2008
- Magyar Kupa:
  - Winner: 2005, 2006, 2007
  - Silver Medallist: 2004, 2011
- Liga Naţională:
  - Silver Medallist: 2009
- EHF Champions League:
  - Semifinalist: 2007
- EHF Women's Cup Winners' Cup:
  - Finalist: 2006
- EHF Cup:
  - Finalist: 2004, 2005
- Norwegian League
  - Bronze: 2017/2018
- Norwegian Cup:
  - Finalist: 2018, 2019
