= Gábor Bardi (footballer, born 1982) =

Hungarian footballer

Personal information
- Date of birth: 13 May 1982 (age 44)
- Place of birth: Kisvárda, Hungary
- Height: 1.86 m (6 ft 1 in)
- Position: Forward

Senior career*
Years	Team	Apps	(Gls)
2003–2004	Vasas	12	(1)
2004–2006	Nyíregyháza Spartacus	27	(11)
2006–2007	Paks	1	(0)
2007–2009	Bőcs	30	(10)
2009–2010	Szolnok	10	(2)
2010–2011	Eger	26	(23)
2012–2017	Jászapáti		
- * Club domestic league appearances and goals

Gábor Bardi (born 13 May 1982) is a Hungarian former professional footballer who played as a forward.

== Career ==
Bardi signed with Jászapáti on 23 May 2012, after an impressive season with Eger in the Nemzeti Bajnokság II, becoming top goalscorer as well as captaining the team to the title and promotion.
