= Gheorghe Grozav =

Romanian footballer (born 1990)

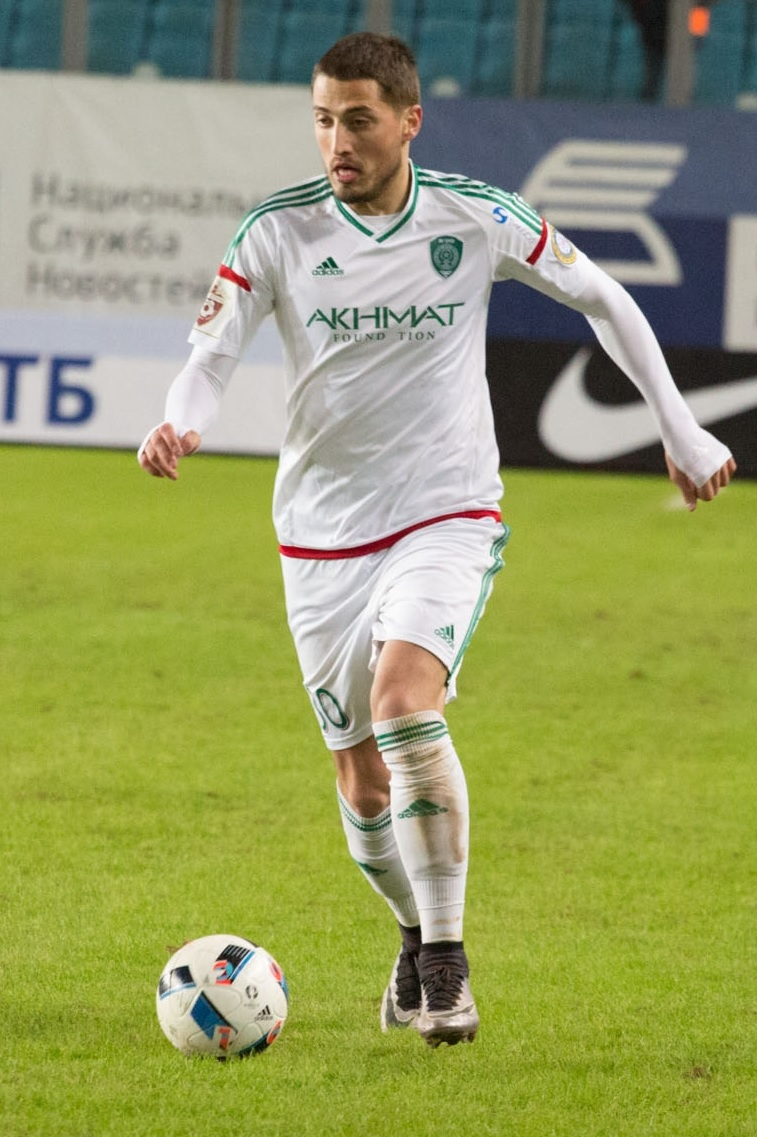
- Grozav with Terek Grozny in 2016

Personal information
- Full name: Gheorghe Teodor Grozav
- Date of birth: 29 September 1990 (age 36)
- Place of birth: Alba Iulia, Romania
- Height: 1.83 m (6 ft 0 in)
- Positions: Winger; attacking midfielder

Team information
- Current team: Corona Brașov
- Number: 7

Youth career
- –2007: Unirea Alba Iulia

Senior career*
Years	Team	Apps	(Gls)
2007–2009	Unirea Alba Iulia	62	(14)
2010–2012	Standard Liège	15	(0)
2011–2012	→ Universitatea Cluj (loan)	24	(6)
2012–2013	Petrolul Ploiești	36	(10)
2013–2017	Terek Grozny	46	(7)
2015	→ Dinamo București (loan)	11	(4)
2017–2018	Karabükspor	14	(2)
2018	Bursaspor	8	(0)
2018	Dinamo București	3	(0)
2019–2020	Kisvárda	37	(12)
2020–2021	Diósgyőr	29	(8)
2021–2022	MTK Budapest	26	(6)
2022–2026	Petrolul Ploiești	153	(36)
2026–	Corona Brașov	0	(0)

International career
2008	Romania U19	1	(0)
2009–2011	Romania U21	5	(1)
2012–2019	Romania	31	(5)
- * Club domestic league appearances and goals as of 18 May 2026

Gheorghe "Gicu" Teodor Grozav (Romanian pronunciation: [ˈɡe̯orɡe teˈodor groˈzav]; born 29 September 1990) is a Romanian professional footballer who plays as a winger or an attacking midfielder for Liga III club Corona Brașov, which he captains.

Grozav started his senior career at his hometown club Unirea Alba Iulia in 2007. At the start of 2010, he moved abroad for the first time to Belgian side Standard Liège. Following a loan to Universitatea Cluj in the 2011–12 season, Grozav returned to Romania again at Petrolul Ploiești, with which he won a Cupa României trophy. His performances prompted another transfer abroad to Russian club Terek Grozny in the summer of 2013, spending several seasons there before moving frequently between teams in Romania, Turkey, and Hungary.

At international level, Grozav made his full debut for Romania in May 2012, scoring the only goal of a friendly win over Switzerland. He has since totalled over 30 matches for his country.

== Club career ==
=== Unirea Alba Iulia ===
Grozav started his career at his hometown club Unirea Alba Iulia, playing his first match in the 2007–08 Liga II season. In the summer of 2009, after two years in the Romanian Liga II, Grozav wanted to score a move away at Standard Liège as a free agent. He was later forced by UEFA to sign for another three years with the club for which he was a junior.

On 1 September 2009, Gicu Grozav made his Liga I debut in a 1–0 defeat against FC Brașov.

=== Standard Liège ===
László Bölöni eventually brought Grozav to Belgium in January 2010, signing for Standard Liège for an undisclosed fee, whilst Unirea Alba Iulia retained 15% of the players rights. He got limited playing time in his first two years with the team, only making 15 league appearances.

For the 2011–12 season Grozav was transferred to Liga I team Universitatea Cluj on a one-year loan move. He refound his form here as he helped his team to an eighth-place finish.

=== Petrolul Ploiești ===
In the summer of 2012 Gicu Grozav signed a three-year contract with Petrolul Ploiești after a number of his teammates also signed with the Yellow Wolves. On 8 August 2013, he scored the decisive goal against Dutch outfit Vitesse Arnhem in the 95th minute to make sure Petrolul Ploiești progressed to the Europa League last preliminary round for the first time in the club's history. On 25 August 2013, Grozav scored a consolation goal with an overhead kick against Swansea City in the play-off.

=== Terek Grozny ===
On 28 August 2013 he joined the Russian Premier League side Terek Grozny for a rumoured fee of €2.1 million.

On 2 February 2015, Grozav once again returned to Romania, signing for Dinamo București on loan.

=== Turkey ===
On 27 July 2017, Grozav joined Turkish Süper Lig side Kardemir Karabükspor on a three-year contract. On 19 August, he scored on his league debut for the club in a 3–1 home win over İstanbul Başakşehir.

Grozav was signed by Bursaspor on a six-month contract with the option of another two years on 17 January 2018.

=== Return to Dinamo București ===
On 2 October 2018, Grozav re-signed for Dinamo București. He was released from his contract on 2 November.

=== Hungary ===
On 16 January 2019, Grozav signed for Kisvárda. On 31 March 2020, Kisvárda terminated Grozav's contract when he and teammate Iasmin Latovlevici left for Romania without permission during the COVID-19 pandemic.

=== Return to Petrolul Ploiești ===
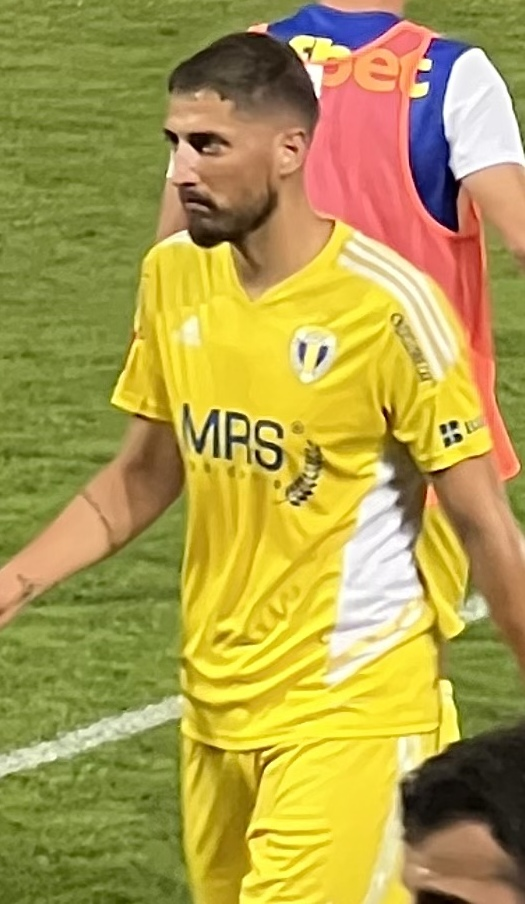
Grozav playing for Petrolul Ploiești in July 2022.

On 14 June 2022, Petrolul Ploiești announced that Grozav would be returning to the club and commence training the following day.

== International career ==
Grozav made his debut for the senior team in a friendly match against Switzerland on 30 May 2012, where he scored the winning goal. This was the first-ever goal scored for the full side by a player born after the Romanian revolution. On 12 October 2012, Grozav netted the only goal of a 1–0 victory over Turkey at the Şükrü Saracoğlu Stadium.

== Personal life ==
Grozav's uncle, Cornel Țălnar, also played football for Dinamo București, Petrolul Ploiești and Unirea Alba Iulia. In May 2022, he married handballer Sorina Tîrcă.

== Career statistics ==
=== Club ===
As of match played 19 August 2026

Appearances and goals by club, season and competition
Club	Season	League			National cup (Note: Includes Cupa României, Russian Cup, Turkish Cup, Magyar Kupa)		Europe		Other		Total	
Club	Season	Division	Apps	Goals	Apps	Goals	Apps	Goals	Apps	Goals	Apps	Goals
Unirea Alba Iulia	2007–08	Liga II	15	6	2	1	—		—		17	7
Unirea Alba Iulia	2008–09	Liga II	31	6	0	0	—		—		31	6
Unirea Alba Iulia	2009–10	Liga II	16	2	1	0	—		—		17	2
Unirea Alba Iulia	Total		62	14	3	1	—		—		64	15
Standard Liège	2009–10	Belgian Pro League	5	0	—		1 (Note: Appearances în UEFA Europa League)	0	—		6	0
Standard Liège	2010–11	Belgian Pro League	10	0	0	0	—		—		10	0
Standard Liège	Total		15	0	0	0	1	0	—		16	0
Universitatea Cluj (loan)	2011–12	Liga I	24	6	1	0	—		—		25	6
Petrolul Ploiești	2012–13	Liga I	31	9	5	0	—		—		35	9
Petrolul Ploiești	2013–14	Liga I	5	1	0	0	5	6	1 (Note: Appearance in Supercupa României)	0	11	7
Petrolul Ploiești	Total		36	10	5	0	5	6	1	0	47	16
Terek Grozny	2013–14	Russian Premier League	7	0	3	1	—		—		10	1
Terek Grozny	2014–15	Russian Premier League	0	0	0	0	—		—		0	0
Terek Grozny	2015–16	Russian Premier League	18	2	3	0	—		—		21	2
Terek Grozny	2016–17	Russian Premier League	21	5	2	0	—		—		23	5
Terek Grozny	Total		46	7	8	1	—		—		54	8
Dinamo București (loan)	2014–15	Liga I	11	3	0	0	—		2 (Note: Appearances in Cupa Ligii)	1	13	4
Karabükspor	2017–18	Süper Lig	14	2	2	0	—		—		16	2
Bursaspor	2017–18	Süper Lig	8	0	—		—		—		8	0
Dinamo București	2018–19	Liga I	3	0	1	0	—		—		4	0
Kisvárda	2018–19	Nemzeti Bajnokság I	14	5	2	1	—		—		16	6
Kisvárda	2019–20	Nemzeti Bajnokság I	23	7	0	0	—		—		23	7
Kisvárda	Total		37	12	2	1	—		—		39	13
Diósgyőr	2020–21	Nemzeti Bajnokság I	29	8	1	2	—		—		30	10
MTK Budapest	2021–22	Nemzeti Bajnokság I	26	6	0	0	0	0	—		26	6
Petrolul Ploiești	2022–23	Liga I	38	10	3	1	—		—		41	11
Petrolul Ploiești	2023–24	Liga I	38	9	3	0	—		—		41	9
Petrolul Ploiești	2024–25	Liga I	39	10	2	0	—		—		41	10
Petrolul Ploiești	2025–26	Liga I	38	7	2	1	—		—		40	8
Petrolul Ploiești	Total		153	36	10	2	—		—		163	38
Corona Brașov	2026–27	Liga III	0	0	2	0	—		—		2	0
Career total			465	104	35	7	6	6	3	1	508	118

=== International ===
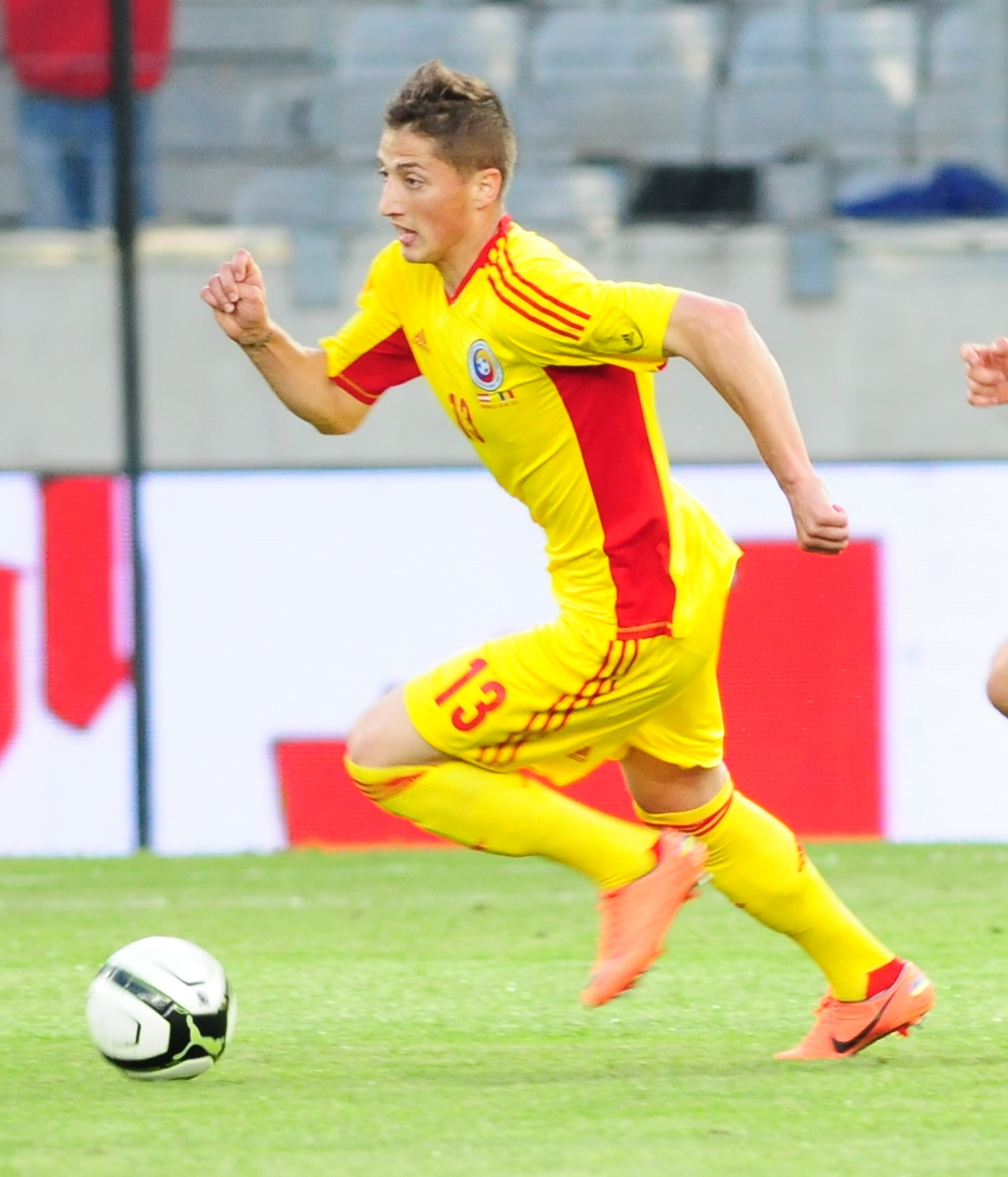
Grozav against Austria in June 2012.

As of match played 8 September 2019

Appearances and goals by national team and year
National team	Year	Apps	Goals
Romania
Romania	2012	8	3
Romania	2013	10	0
Romania	2014	1	0
Romania	2015	0	0
Romania	2016	1	0
Romania	2017	5	2
Romania	2018	4	0
Romania	2019	2	0
Total		31	5

Scores and results list Romania's goal tally first, score column indicates score after each Grozav goal

List of international goals scored by Gheorghe Grozav
No.	Date	Venue	Cap	Opponent	Score	Result	Competition
1	30 May 2012	Swissporarena, Lucerne, Switzerland	1	Switzerland	1–0	1–0	Friendly
2	15 August 2012	Stožice, Ljubljana, Slovenia	3	Slovenia	3–4	3–4	Friendly
3	12 October 2012	Şükrü Saracoğlu, Istanbul, Turkey	6	Turkey	1–0	1–0	2014 World Cup qualification
4	9 November 2017	Dr. Constantin Rădulescu, Cluj-Napoca, Romania	22	Turkey	1–0	2–0	Friendly
5	9 November 2017	Dr. Constantin Rădulescu, Cluj-Napoca, Romania	22	Turkey	2–0	2–0	Friendly

== Honours ==
Unirea Alba Iulia

- Liga II: 2008–09

Standard Liège

- Belgian Cup: 2010–11

Petrolul Ploiești

- Cupa României: 2012–13
- Supercupa României runner-up: 2013
