= Stavros Tsoukalas =

Greek footballer (born 1988)

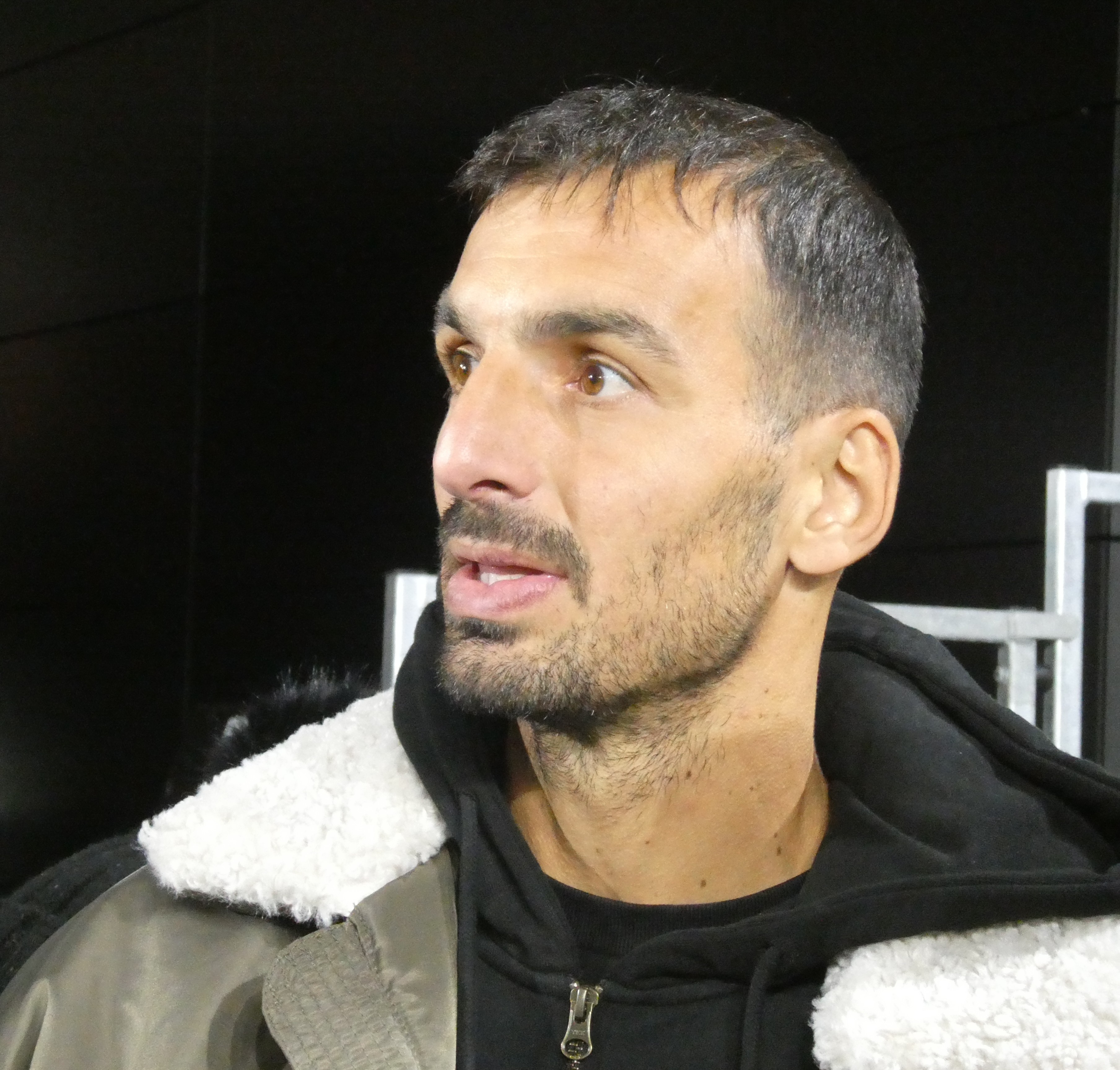
- Stavros Tsoukalas in 2025.

Personal information
- Full name: Stavros Tsoukalas
- Date of birth: 28 May 1988 (age 38)
- Place of birth: Thessaloniki, Greece
- Height: 1.86 m (6 ft 1 in)
- Position: Midfielder

Team information
- Current team: Omonia 29M
- Number: 5

Youth career
- 2006–2008: PAOK

Senior career*
Years	Team	Apps	(Gls)
2008–2012	PAOK	21	(1)
2008–2010	→ Doxa Dramas (loan)	49	(11)
2010	→ Nea Salamina (loan)	11	(0)
2012–2016	PAS Giannina	129	(14)
2016–2018	Asteras Tripolis	37	(2)
2018	Apollon Smyrnis	12	(1)
2019–2021	Kisvárda	55	(8)
2021	Nea Salamina	21	(2)
2021–2023	Niki Volos	57	(7)
2023–2026	Karmiotissa	82	(8)
2026–	Omonia 29M	12	(4)
- * Club domestic league appearances and goals as of 3 May 2026

Stavros Tsoukalas (Greek: Σταύρος Τσουκαλάς; born 28 May 1988) is a Greek professional footballer who plays as a midfielder for Cypriot Second Division club Omonia 29M.

== Career ==
=== PAOK ===
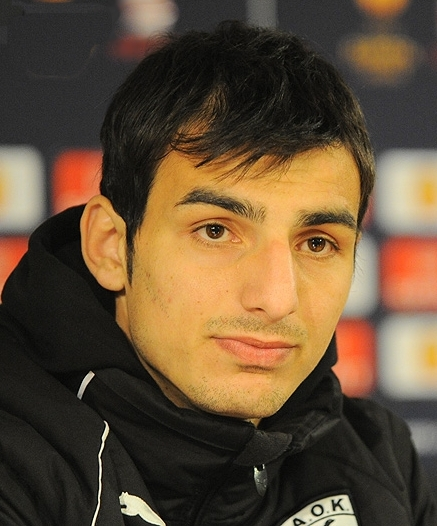
Stavros Tsoukalas at the PAOK's press conference.

Tsoukalas spend two years loaned to Doxa Dramas and then was immediately loaned again to Cypriot team Nea Salamina. In January 2011 he returned to PAOK. On 14 June 2011, he renewed his contract with the club until 2015. At the start of 2012–13 season he was informed that he was not part of PAOK new coach Georgios Donis plans. On 7 August 2012, Tsoukalas' contract was mutually terminated.

=== PAS Giannina ===
On 8 August 2012 and after the contract termination with PAOK, Tsoukalas agreed to sign a two years contract with PAS Giannina, besides the interest of Greek giants AEK Athens. On 25 August 2012, he made his debut with the club in a 0–0 home draw against Platanias. From this match since 5 December 2014, he played constantly with the club without be injured or expelled in any of those 81 consecutive matches, established a record for the club. He didn't play on 6 December 2014 in the away match against Greek champions Olympiacos, but since then he returned to the starting eleven for the rest of the 2014–15 season. Tsoukalas started the 2015–16 season as the indisputable leader of PAS Giannina middle line.

=== Asteras Tripolis ===
On 24 June 2016, Asteras Tripolis used a buying clause term of €150,000 in order to sign the player for a three-year contract. More specifically, Tsoukalas has the right to buy the remainder of his contract, which is normally completed on 30.6.2017. Meanwhile, PAS Giannina express their dissatisfaction, as they lose one of their best players ahead of the Europa League qualifiers. On 10 January 2018, he solved his contract with the club.

=== Apollon Smyrnis ===
On 15 January 2018 and after the contract termination with Asteras Tripolis, Tsoukalas agreed to sign a six months contract with Apollon Smyrnis. On 31 May 2018, he solved his contract with the club.

=== Kisvárda ===
On 9 January 2019, he signed a 6-month contract with Hungarian side Kisvárda. At the end of the season, he renewed his contract until the summer of 2021.

=== Nea Salamina ===
On 28 December 2020, he signed a 6-month contract with Cypriot side Nea Salamina, in which he had played ten years ago, on loan from PAOK.

== Club statistics ==
Club performance			League		Cup		Continental		Total	
Season	Club	League	Apps	Goals	Apps	Goals	Apps	Goals	Apps	Goals
Greece			League		Greek Cup		Europe		Total	
2008–09	Doxa Dramas	Gamma Ethniki	28	11	2	2	-		30	13
2009–10	Doxa Dramas	Beta Ethniki	21	0	1	0	-		22	0
2010–11	Nea Salamina	Cypriot First Division	11	0	2	0	-		13	0
2020–21	Nea Salamina	Cypriot First Division	17	2	1	0	-		18	2
2010–11	PAOK	Super League Greece	15	1	4	0	2	0	21	1
2011–12	PAOK	Super League Greece	6	0	0	0	2	0	8	0
2012–13	PAS Giannina	Super League Greece	36	3	3	1	-		39	4
2013–14	PAS Giannina	Super League Greece	34	4	2	0	0	0	36	4
2014–15	PAS Giannina	Super League Greece	31	3	3	0	0	0	34	3
2015–16	PAS Giannina	Super League Greece	28	4	5	0	0	0	33	4
2016–17	Asteras Tripolis	Super League Greece	29	2	5	1	-		34	3
2017–18	Asteras Tripolis	Super League Greece	8	0	3	1	0	0	11	1
2017–18	Apollon Smyrnis	Super League Greece	12	1	0	0	-		12	1
2018–19	Kisvárda	NBI	15	4	2	0	-		17	4
2019–20	Kisvárda	NBI	27	3	1	0	-		28	3
2020–21	Kisvárda	NBI	13	1	1	0	-		14	1
2021–22	Niki Volos	Super League 2	32	6	5	0	-		37	6
2022–23	Niki Volos	Super League 2	25	1	2	0	-		27	1
2023–24	Karmiotissa FC	Cypriot First Division	22	3	0	0	-		22	3
Greece		Total	295	36	35	5	4	0	334	41
Cyprus		Total	50	5	3	0	0	0	53	5
Hungary		Total	55	8	4	0	0	0	59	8
Career total			400	49	42	5	4	0	446	54

Statistics accurate as of 18 February 2024
