= Zalán (given name) =

Zalán is a Hungarian given name. People with the name include:

- Zalán Czene (born 2002), Hungarian footballer
- Zalán Kállai (born 2004), Hungarian footballer
- Zalán Keresztes (born 2001), Hungarian footballer
- Zalán Kerezsi (born 2003), Hungarian footballer
- Zalán Pekler (born 2000), Hungarian sports shooter
- Zalán Sárkány (born 2003), Hungarian swimmer
- Zalán Vancsa (born 2004), Hungarian footballer
- Zalán Zombori (born 1975), Hungarian footballer
