= Viktor Riznychenko =

Ukrainian footballer

Personal information
- Date of birth: 21 June 2002 (age 24)
- Place of birth: Ukraine
- Position: Midfielder

Team information
- Current team: SK Strobl

Youth career
- 2017–2020: Kisvárda

Senior career*
Years	Team	Apps	(Gls)
2020	Kisvárda	1	(0)
2020–2021	Kisvárda II	15	(1)
2021–2022	Hidasnémeti	19	(0)
2022	Putnok	12	(0)
2022–	SK Strobl		
- * Club domestic league appearances and goals as of 15 May 2022

Viktor Riznychenko (born 21 June 2002) is a Ukrainian professional footballer who plays for Austrian club SK Strobl.

== Career statistics ==
As of 13 June 2020.

Appearances and goals by club, season and competition
Club	Season	League			Cup		Continental		Other		Total	
Club	Season	Division	Apps	Goals	Apps	Goals	Apps	Goals	Apps	Goals	Apps	Goals
Kisvárda	2019–20	Nemzeti Bajnokság I	1	0	0	0	—		0	0	1	0
Kisvárda	Total		1	0	0	0	0	0	0	0	1	0
Career total			1	0	0	0	0	0	0	0	1	0
