= Andriy Cherepko =

Ukrainian football goalkeeper

Personal information
- Full name: Andriy Vasylyovych Cherepko
- Date of birth: 17 January 1997 (age 29)
- Place of birth: Pryborzhavske, Zakarpattia Oblast, Ukraine
- Height: 1.85 m (6 ft 1 in)
- Position: Goalkeeper

Team information
- Current team: Tarpa SC

Youth career
- 2011–2014: Youth Sportive School Uzhhorod

Senior career*
Years	Team	Apps	(Gls)
2015	Borzhava Dovhe	?	(?)
2015–2016	Hoverla Uzhhorod	1	(0)
2016	Spartakus Uzhhorod	6	(0)
2016	Munkach Mukacheve	5	(0)
2017	Mándok VSE	?	(?)
2017–2019	Kisvárda	0	(0)
2019–2020	Mynai	1	(0)
2020	Nyva Terebovlya	8	(0)
2021–	Tarpa SC	?	(?)
- * Club domestic league appearances and goals as of 25 April 2021

Andriy Vasylyovych Cherepko (Ukrainian: Андрій Васильович Черепко; born 17 January 1997) is a Ukrainian football goalkeeper.

== Career ==
Cherepko is a product of the Uzhhorod Youth Sportive School System. In 2015 after playing in the amateur level, he signed a contract with FC Hoverla, but played only in the FC Hoverla Uzhhorod reserves. In the main-team squad Cherepko made his debut as a substitute in the match against FC Volyn Lutsk on 14 May 2016 in the Ukrainian Premier League.
