= Zalan, Republic of Buryatia =

Zalan Залан
- Ulus
- Location within Republic of Buryatia Location within Russia
- Coordinates: 51°04′N 106°53′E
- Country: Russia
- Region: Republic of Buryatia
- District: Selenginsky District
- Time zone: UTC+8:00

Zalan (Russian: Залан) is a rural locality (an ulus) in Selenginsky District, Republic of Buryatia, Russia. The population was 74 as of 2010. There are 2 streets.

== Geography ==
Zalan is located 54 km southeast of Gusinoozyorsk (the district's administrative centre) by road. Zurgan-Debe is the nearest rural locality.
