= Zalan-e Olya =

Zalan-e Olya ظلان عليا
- Village
- Location within Iran
- Coordinates: 34°09′24″N 47°00′07″E
- Country: Iran
- Province: Kermanshah
- County: Kermanshah
- Bakhsh: Firuzabad
- Rural District: Sar Firuzabad

Population (2006)
  - Total: 56
- Time zone: UTC+3:30 (IRST)
  - Summer (DST): UTC+4:30 (IRDT)

Zalan-e Olya (Persian: ظلان عليا, also romanized as Zalān-e Olyā) is a village in Sar Firuzabad Rural District, Firuzabad District, Kermanshah County, Kermanshah Province, Iran. At the 2006 census, its population was 56, in 14 families.
