= Péter Kozma (politician) =

Hungarian politician

Member of the National Assembly
- In office 14 May 2010 – 5 May 2014
- In office 18 June 1998 – 15 May 2006

Personal details
- Born: 5 September 1959 Kisvárda, Hungary
- Died: 4 March 2017 (aged 57)
- Party: Fidesz (1990–2017)
- Children: 2
- Profession: politician

Péter Kozma (5 September 1959 – 4 March 2017) was a Hungarian politician, member of the National Assembly (MP) from Fidesz Szabolcs-Szatmár-Bereg County Regional List from 1998 to 2006 and from 2010 to 2014.

Kozma served as Vice President of the General Assembly of Szabolcs-Szatmár-Bereg County between 2006 and 2010. He had been a member of the Constitutional, Judicial and Standing Orders Committee since 2006, therefore he participated in the drawing up of the new constitution in 2011. From 1 July 2014 to 15 January 2017, he served as Director of the Szabolcs-Szatmár-Bereg County Government Office.

He died on 4 March 2017, aged 57.

== Personal life ==
He was married and had two children.
