= Cornel Ene =

Romanian footballer (born 1993)

Personal information
- Full name: Cornel Alexandru Ene
- Date of birth: 21 July 1993 (age 33)
- Place of birth: Satu Mare, Romania
- Height: 1.86 m (6 ft 1 in)
- Position: Centre-back

Team information
- Current team: Politehnica Timișoara
- Number: 3

Youth career
- –2011: Olimpia Satu Mare

Senior career*
| Years | Team | Apps | (Gls) |
| 2011–2012 | CFR II Cluj | | |
| 2012–2016 | CFR Cluj | 11 | (0) |
| 2012–2013 | → UTA Arad (loan) | 18 | (2) |
| 2013–2014 | → Olimpia Satu Mare (loan) | 26 | (1) |
| 2017 | Pandurii Târgu Jiu | 16 | (0) |
| 2017 | ASA Târgu Mureș | 5 | (1) |
| 2018 | Juventus București | 6 | (0) |
| 2018–2021 | Kisvárda | 52 | (1) |
| 2021–2022 | Gyirmót | 8 | (0) |
| 2022–2023 | Mioveni | 5 | (0) |
| 2023 | Hermannstadt | 8 | (0) |
| 2023–2024 | Haladás | 20 | (0) |
| 2024–2025 | Budapest Honvéd | 9 | (0) |
| 2025– | Politehnica Timișoara | 32 | (5) |

International career
| 2011 | Romania U19 | 2 | (0) |
- * Club domestic league appearances and goals as of 31 October 2026

Cornel Alexandru Ene (born 21 July 1993) is a Romanian professional footballer who plays as a centre-back for Liga II club Politehnica Timișoara.

== Honours ==
CFR Cluj

- Cupa României: 2015–16
- Supercupa României runner-up: 2016

Politehnica Timișoara

- Liga III: 2025–26
