= Sergiu Negruț =

Romanian footballer

Personal information
- Full name: Sergiu Dorin Negruț
- Date of birth: 1 April 1993 (age 33)
- Place of birth: Cluj-Napoca, Romania
- Height: 1.81 m (5 ft 11 in)
- Position: Forward

Youth career
- 2000–2007: ȘF Zoltán Ivansuc
- 2007–2010: CFR Cluj

Senior career*
Years	Team	Apps	(Gls)
2010–2016	CFR Cluj	42	(5)
2012	→ Unirea Alba Iulia (loan)	9	(0)
2013	→ Damila Măciuca (loan)	10	(4)
2013	→ Râmnicu Vâlcea (loan)	12	(5)
2017	Pandurii Târgu Jiu	18	(3)
2017–2018	Beroe Stara Zagora	28	(1)
2018–2019	Kisvárda	13	(0)
2019–2020	Turris Turnu Măgurele	12	(2)
2020	Mioveni	13	(2)
2021	Focșani	7	(3)
2021	SCM Zalău	15	(6)
2022	Astra Giurgiu	6	(1)
2022	Minerul Ocna Dej	7	(0)
- * Club domestic league appearances and goals as of 13:19, 20 December 2022 (UTC)

Sergiu Dorin Negruț (born 1 April 1993) is a Romanian professional footballer who plays as a forward. In his career Negruț also played for teams such as CFR Cluj, Pandurii Târgu Jiu, Beroe Stara Zagora and Kisvárda FC, among others.

== Honours ==
=== Club ===
CFR Cluj

- Liga I: 2011–12
- Cupa României: 2015–16
