= Matija Mišić =

Croatian footballer

Personal information
- Full name: Matija Mišić
- Date of birth: 30 January 1992 (age 34)
- Place of birth: Županja, Croatia
- Height: 1.74 m (5 ft 9 in)
- Position: Defensive midfielder

Youth career
- 2002–2004: Zrinski Bošnjaci
- 2005–2006: Cibalia
- 2006–2011: Osijek

Senior career*
Years	Team	Apps	(Gls)
2010–2015	Osijek	13	(0)
2010	→ Vukovar '91 (loan)	14	(1)
2011–2012	→ Inter Zaprešić (loan)	17	(0)
2014	→ Solin (loan)	13	(0)
2014–2015	→ Cibalia (loan)	25	(0)
2015–2017	Cibalia	61	(7)
2017–2019	Kisvárda	46	(4)
2019	Kisvárda II	12	(1)
2019–2020	Soroksár	19	(0)
2020–2023	BSK Bijelo Brdo	91	(4)
- * Club domestic league appearances and goals as of 15 January 2024

Matija Mišić (born 30 January 1992 in Županja) is a former Croatian football player, who last played for Croatian second tier-outfit BSK Bijelo Brdo.

Mišić retired from his playing career in January 2024, becoming the assistant of the fist-team coach Denis Krstanović.

== Personal life ==
He is the older brother of Josip Mišić.

== Career ==
=== Kisvárda ===
On 30 July 2017, Mišić played his first match for Kisvárda in a 3-3 drawn against Mosonmagyaróvár in the Hungarian League Second level.

== Career statistics ==
Appearances and goals by club, season and competition
Club	Season	League		Cup		Europe		Total	
Club	Season	Apps	Goals	Apps	Goals	Apps	Goals	Apps	Goals
Inter Zaprešić
Inter Zaprešić	2011–12	17	0	1	0	—		18	0
Inter Zaprešić	Total	17	0	1	0	—		18	0
Osijek
Osijek	2012–13	9	0	1	0	1	0	11	0
Osijek	2013–14	4	0	1	0	—		5	0
Osijek	Total	13	0	2	0	1	0	16	0
Solin
Solin	2013–14	13	0	0	0	—		13	0
Solin	Total	13	0	0	0	—		13	0
Cibalia
Cibalia	2014–15	25	0	1	0	—		26	0
Cibalia	2015–16	28	6	2	0	—		30	6
Cibalia	2016–17	30	1	2	0	—		32	1
Cibalia	2017–18	1	0	0	0	—		1	0
Cibalia	Total	84	7	5	0	0	0	89	7
Kisvárda
Kisvárda	2017–18	33	3	2	0	—		35	3
Kisvárda	2018–19	13	1	2	0	—		15	1
Kisvárda	2019–20	19	0	0	0	—		19	0
Total	46	4	4	0	0	0	50	4	
Career total		173	11	12	0	1	0	186	11

Updated to games played as of 19 May 2019.
