= Zalán Czene =

Hungarian footballer

Personal information
- Date of birth: 22 December 2002 (age 23)
- Place of birth: Záhony, Hungary
- Height: 1.86 m (6 ft 1 in)
- Position: Right back

Team information
- Current team: Kisvárda II

Youth career
- 2013–2015: Cigánd
- 2015–2020: Kisvárda

Senior career*
Years	Team	Apps	(Gls)
2020	Kisvárda	2	(0)
2020–	Kisvárda II		
- * Club domestic league appearances and goals as of 27 June 2020

Zalán Czene (born 22 December 2002) is a Hungarian professional footballer who plays for Kisvárda II.

== Career statistics ==
As of 27 June 2020.

Appearances and goals by club, season and competition
Club	Season	League			Cup		Continental		Other		Total	
Club	Season	Division	Apps	Goals	Apps	Goals	Apps	Goals	Apps	Goals	Apps	Goals
Kisvárda	2019–20	Nemzeti Bajnokság I	2	0	0	0	—		0	0	2	0
Kisvárda	Total		2	0	0	0	0	0	0	0	2	0
Career total			2	0	0	0	0	0	0	0	2	0
