= Kisvárda =

- Town
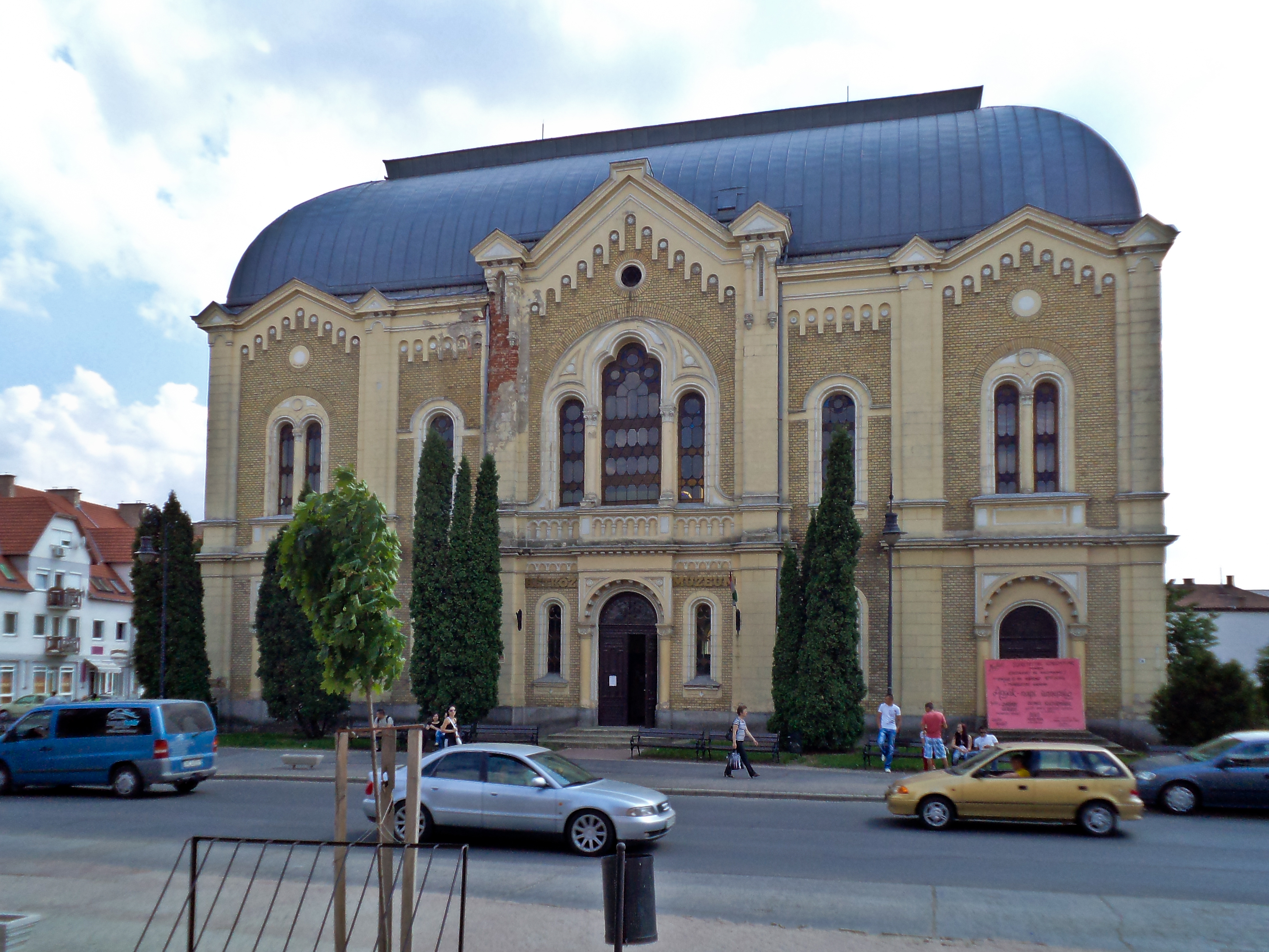
- Rétköz Museum

- Flag Coat of arms

- Location within Hungary
- Coordinates: 48°13′N 22°05′E
- Country: Hungary
- County: Szabolcs-Szatmár-Bereg
- District: Kisvárda

Area
  - Total: 35.91 km^{2} (13.86 sq mi)

Population (2012)
  - Total: 16,473
  - Density: 502.03/km^{2} (1,300.3/sq mi)
- Time zone: UTC+1 (CET)
  - Summer (DST): UTC+2 (CEST)
- Postal code: 4600
- Area code: (+36) 45
- Website: www.kisvarda.hu

Kisvárda (pronounced [ˈkiʃvaːrdɒ]; German: Kleinwardein, Yiddish: קליינווארדיין, romanized: Kleynvardeyn, Ukrainian: Кішварда) is a town in Szabolcs-Szatmár-Bereg County, in the Northern Great Plain region of eastern Hungary near the border of Slovakia and Ukraine. It is the 3rd largest town in Szabolcs-Szatmár-Bereg after Nyíregyháza and Mátészalka with a population of 16 669 people. The Subregion of Kisvárda lies between two large landscapes, the Nyírség and the Rétköz. Kisvárda is just 22 km (14 mi) from the border of Ukraine, 30 km (18.6 mi) from Slovakia, 43.9 km (27.3 mi) from Nyíregyháza, 50 km (31 mi) from Ungvár (Uzhorod), 52.1 km (32.4 mi) from Beregszász (Berehove), 52.9 km (32.9 mi) from Sátoraljaújhely and 80 km (50 mi) from Dorolţ, Romania.

== Etymology ==
The name of the town, which means "little castle" in Hungarian, dates back to the Conquest of Hungary. The conquering Hungarians named the town for its earthwork. In the Middle Ages, it occurred like Warda and Warada in documents. The "kis" (meaning little) word part was added to differentiate the town from Nagyvárad (now Oradea, Romania), "nagy" meaning great or large.

== Coat of arms ==
The red and white stripes on the shield symbolize the Árpád Dynasty, the medieval kings of Hungary. The sword with the Sun and green background shows the heroic knights of Kisvárda. The scales represents the town's trade and markets. In the middle of the shield there is the Castle of Kisvárda in gold. There is a dark green, winged dragon around the shield, choking itself with its tail wrapped around its neck. This is the insignia of the Order of the Dragon which derives from the Várday family's coat of arms.

== History ==
The conquering Hungarians found a hill fort here in 895 which then they used for their border protection system.

St. Ladislaus defeated the Kuntesk Cuman prince in 1085 in a great fight. In memory of the glorious battle, he had a church established. He dedicated it to St Peter and St Paul Apostles.

In the 12th century, the settlement's importance declined. The castle became the possession of the Swabian-Swedish Gutkeled family. The settlement was the denominator of one branch of the family, the Várdays. The Várday family worked a lot to revive Kisvárda. Shortly the place got their fair housing law.

Pelbárt Várady got permission from the king to build the Castle of Kisvárda in 1415.

In 1421, it became a town. István Várday, the Archbishop of Kalocsa, Matthias Corvinus's chancellor expended the town's autonomy in 1468. At that time, the population of Kisvárda was more than a thousand people. It became the centre of Szabolcs. The first guild was formed in 1591.

Because of the Turkish conquest of Hungary and the economic changes, the town's importance diminished.

Prior to World War II, Kisvárda had a total population of approximately 20,000.

Of the total population, 3,500 were Jewish and there were twelve synagogues. The Nazi Germans and their Hungarian allies confined the Jewish community to a ghetto in 1944 and gathered an additional 3,500 Jews from the surrounding area into the Kisvárda ghetto. They were deported to the Auschwitz concentration camp where the majority were slaughtered. A small community was re-established after the war, but almost no Jews are left in Kisvárda today.

One of the former synagogues remains one of the most imposing structures in Kisvárda and is now a local history museum known as the Rétközi Múzeum.

== Economy ==
Historically, Kisvárda has been a market town for the surrounding agricultural district, and is also has some light industry such as distilling, electrics, and brake pad production. It is on the main railway line from the Hungarian capital of Budapest to Ukraine. Kisvárda also attracts tourists to its thermal springs, and the ruins of a medieval castle.

== Notable people ==
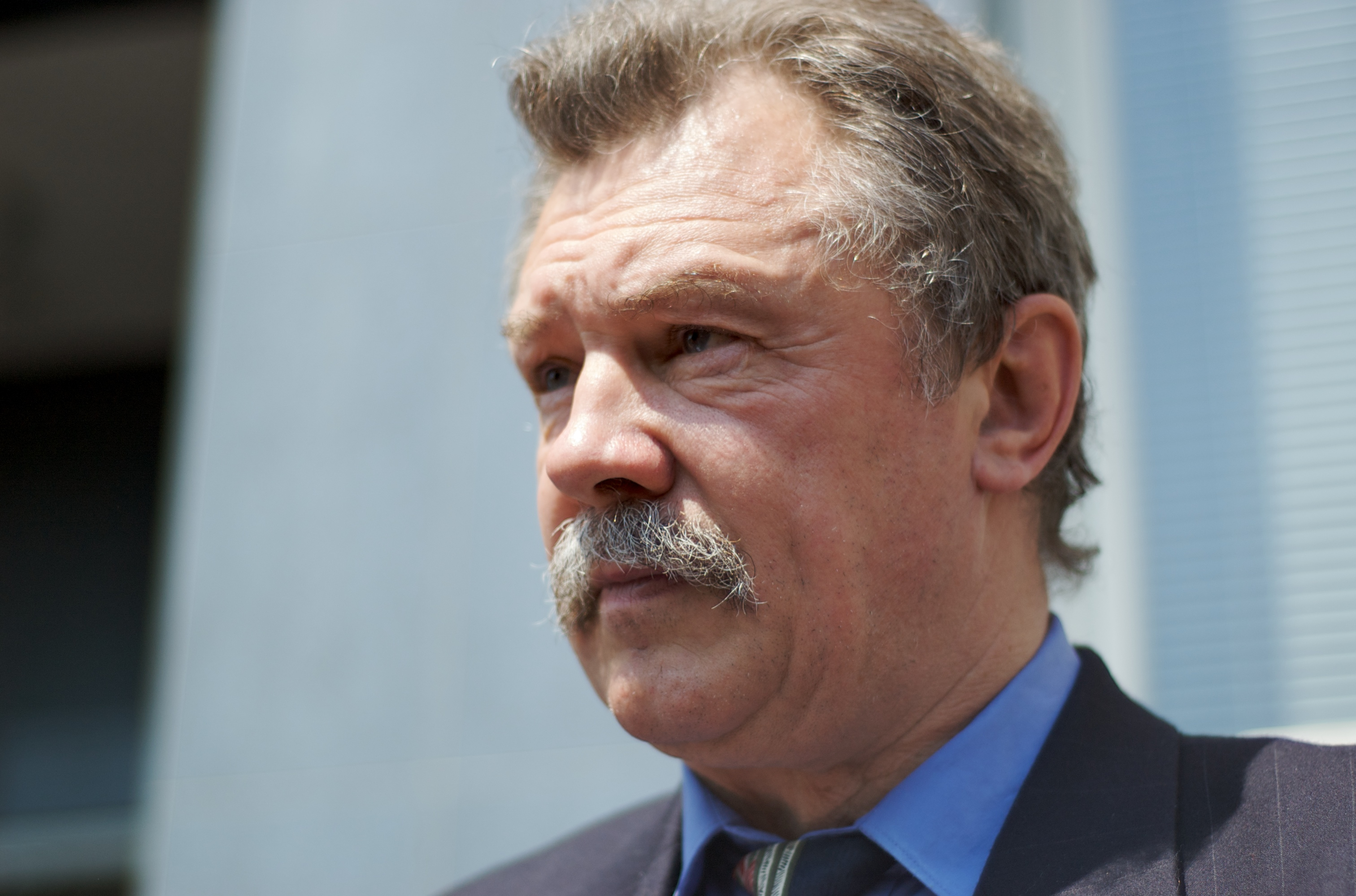
Bertalan Farkas, the first Hungarian astronaut

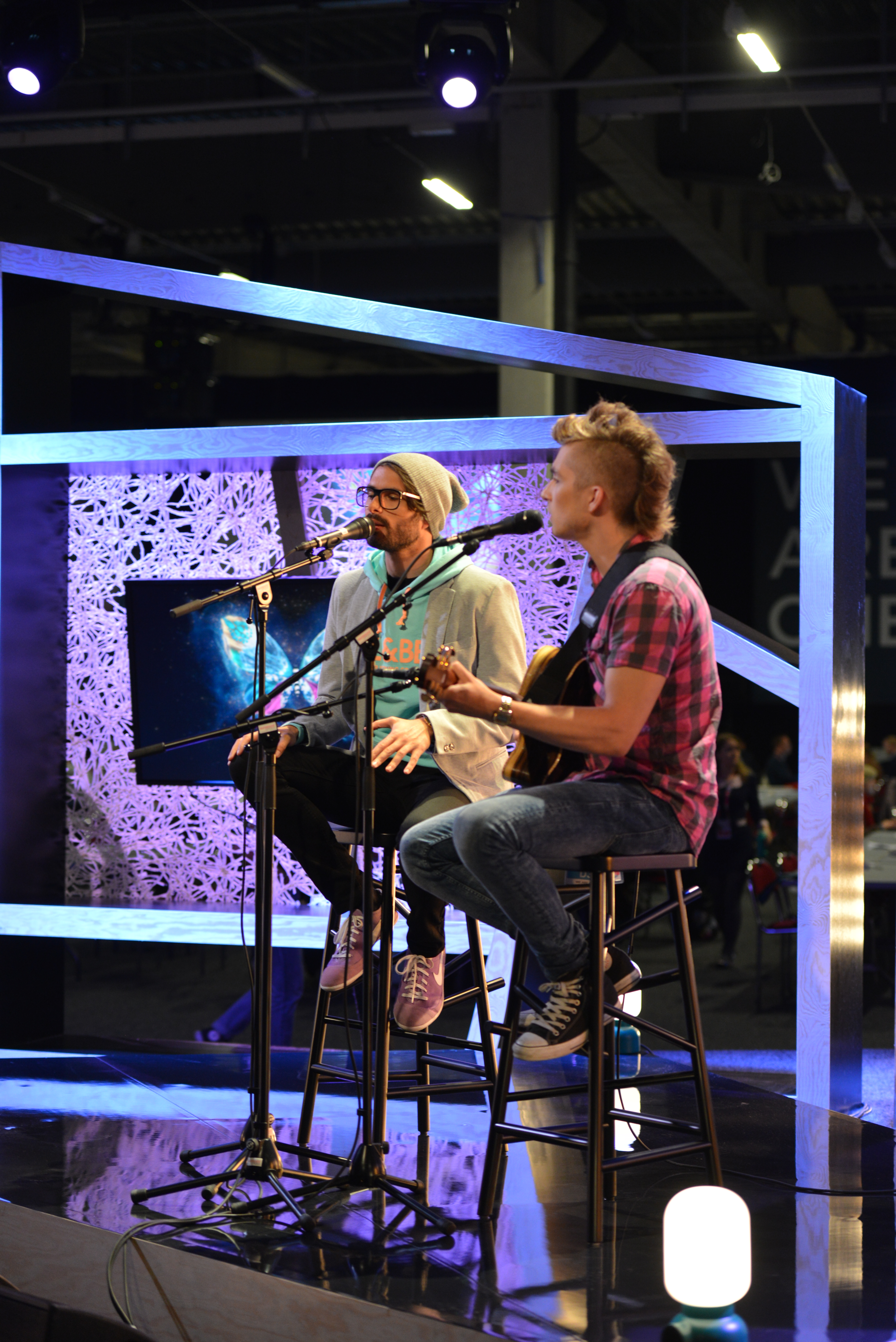
ByeAlex performing his famous song Kedvesem in a studio

- Bertalan Farkas, astronaut
- Krisztina Nyáry (1604–1641)
- ByeAlex, Hungarian singer, songwriter
- Sándor Radó, Hungarian psychoanalyst
- Victor Varconi, Hungarian filmstar who rose to fame in the silent era
- Arnost Zvi Ehrman (1914–1976), Israeli jurist

=== Rabbis ===
- Moshe Grunwald (1853–1910), progenitor of the Pupa Hasidic dynasty through his five sons
- Shimon Sofer (1850–1944), Rav of the Hungarian city of Eger
- Tibor Rosenbaum (1923–1980), rabbi and businessman

=== Politics ===
- Attila Tilki (1967–), politician
- Péter Kozma (1959–2017), politician
- Dr. Miklós Seszták (1968–), jurist, politician, Minister of National Development(2014–), vice president of KDNP
- József Tóbiás (1970–), politician, former leader of the MSZP (2014–2016)
- Dov Gruner, Hungarian-born Zionist activist, member of the Irgun

=== Sports ===
==== Football ====
- Volodymyr Kornutyak (1983–), footballer
- Dušan Pavlov (1989–), footballer
- Yves Mboussi (1987–), footballer
- Zoltan Silvashi (1993–), footballer
- László Miskolczi (1986–), footballer
- Ignác Irhás (1985–), footballer
- Valér Kapacina (1993–), footballer
- Tamás Csilus (1995–), footballer
- Norbert Heffler (1990–), footballer
- Miroslav Grumić (1984–), footballer
- Zsolt Bognár (1979–), footballer
- Zoltán Molnár (1971–), footballer
- Gábor Bardi (1982–), footballer
- Gábor Jánvári (1990–), footballer
- Zoltán Horváth (1989–), footballer
- Raymond Lukacs (1988–), footballer
- Patrik Bacsa (1992–), footballer
- Sergiu Oltean (1987–), footballer
- András Gosztonyi (1990–), footballer
- Péter Baráth (2002–), footballer

==== Handball ====
- Ivett Nagy (1982–), handballer
- Gabriella Juhász, Hungarian handballer
- Ivett Nagy, Hungarian handballer
- Gabriella Juhász (1985–), handballer
- Ágnes Hornyák (1982–), handballer

==== Other ====
- Éva Kaptur (1987–), athlete
- Gyula Halasy (1891–1970), sport shooter
- Ervin Acel (1888–1958), American fencer

== Twin towns – sister cities ==
Kisvárda is twinned with:

- Hildburghausen, Germany
- Karmiel, Israel
- Kráľovský Chlmec, Slovakia
- Mukachevo, Ukraine
- Strzyżów, Poland
- Târgu Secuiesc, Romania

== Sport ==
- Kisvárda FC, association football club
- Kisvárdai KC, handball team
