= Sassá (footballer, born 1988) =

Brazilian footballer

Personal information
- Full name: Jefferson Gomes de Oliveira
- Date of birth: 26 January 1988 (age 38)
- Place of birth: Rio de Janeiro, Brazil
- Height: 1.77 m (5 ft 10 in)
- Position: Forward

Senior career*
Years	Team	Apps	(Gls)
2009–2010	Bangu	23	(5)
2010–2013	Vitória Setúbal	19	(0)
2011–2012	→ Oliveirense (loan)	16	(0)
2013–2014	Volta Redonda	25	(5)
2014–2015	Cabofriense	5	(1)
2015	Daejeon Citizen	7	(0)
2015–2017	Juventude	11	(0)
2017	Al-Ramtha		
2017–2018	Portuguesa-RJ	8	(2)
2018–2021	Kisvárda	83	(7)
2022	Aimoré	9	(2)
- * Club domestic league appearances and goals as of 12 March 2022

Jefferson Gomes de Oliveira (born 26 January 1988), commonly known as Sassá, is a Brazilian footballer who plays as a forward.

He played in Brazil, South Korea and Jordan. On the summer of 2018 he signed a contract with Hungarian premier division club Kisvárda.
