= Martin Izing =

Hungarian football player (b. 1992)

Personal information
- Date of birth: 11 January 1992 (age 34)
- Place of birth: Budapest, Hungary
- Height: 1.87 m (6 ft 2 in)
- Position: Centre-back

Youth career
- 2003–2005: Videoton
- 2005–2007: Felcsút

Senior career*
Years	Team	Apps	(Gls)
2007–2010	Felcsút	7	(0)
2010–2011	Videoton	1	(0)
2012–2013	Tatabánya	41	(1)
2013–2014	Vasas	6	(1)
2014–2015	Mezőkövesd	14	(1)
2015–2019	Kisvárda	69	(3)
2019	→ Siófok (loan)	13	(0)
2019–2021	Siófok	35	(2)
2021–2022	Dorog	30	(1)
2022–2023	Békéscsaba II	12	(1)

International career
2010–2011	Hungary U-19	5	(0)
- * Club domestic league appearances and goals as of 4 December 2022

Martin Izing (born 11 January 1992) is a Hungarian professional football player who plays as a defender.

== Career ==
=== Videoton ===
On 14 May 2011, Izing played his first match for Videoton in a 2–1 win against Győri ETO FC in the Hungarian League.

== Career statistics ==
As of 8 December 2018

Appearances and goals by club, season and competition
Club	Season	League			Cup		League Cup		Total	
Club	Season	Division	Apps	Goals	Apps	Goals	Apps	Goals	Apps	Goals
Felcsút	2007–08	Nemzeti Bajnokság II	1	0	0	0	—		1	0
Felcsút	2008–09	Nemzeti Bajnokság II	6	0	0	0	—		6	0
Felcsút	Total		7	0	0	0	—		7	0
Videoton	2010–11	Nemzeti Bajnokság I	1	0	4	0	—		5	0
Tatabánya	2011–12	Nemzeti Bajnokság II	24	1	2	0	—		26	1
Tatabánya	2012–13	Nemzeti Bajnokság II	17	0	1	0	—		18	0
Tatabánya	Total		41	1	3	0	—		44	1
Vasas	2013–14	Nemzeti Bajnokság II	6	1	0	0	3	0	9	1
Mezőkövesd	2014–15	Nemzeti Bajnokság II	14	1	2	0	1	0	17	1
Kisvárda	2015–16	Nemzeti Bajnokság II	23	1	1	0	—		24	1
Kisvárda	2016–17	Nemzeti Bajnokság II	10	1	1	0	—		11	1
Kisvárda	2017–18	Nemzeti Bajnokság II	31	1	1	0	—		32	1
Kisvárda	2018–19	Nemzeti Bajnokság I	5	0	3	0	—		8	0
Kisvárda	Total		69	3	6	0	—		75	3
Career total			138	6	15	0	4	0	157	6
