= Zoltán Horváth (footballer, born 1989) =

Hungarian footballer

Personal information
- Date of birth: 30 July 1989 (age 37)
- Place of birth: Kisvárda, Hungary
- Height: 1.97 m (6 ft 5 1/2 in)
- Position: Forward

Team information
- Current team: Tiszakécske
- Number: 9

Youth career
- 2003–2008: Nyíregyháza

Senior career*
Years	Team	Apps	(Gls)
2008–2009	Kisvárda	13	(2)
2009–2011	Cigánd	53	(31)
2011–2013	Eger	33	(5)
2013	Debrecen	3	(1)
2014	SV Oberwart	19	(10)
2014–2015	FC Kitzbühel	28	(11)
2016	Union Perg	14	(7)
2016–2017	SC Lassee	9	(0)
2017–2019	Kisvárda	76	(26)
2019–2020	Győri ETO	23	(5)
2020–2021	Kisvárda	19	(1)
2021–2022	Diósgyőr	32	(11)
2022–	Tiszakécske	26	(6)
- * Club domestic league appearances and goals as of 31 May 2023

Zoltán Horváth (born 30 July 1989) is a Hungarian football player who plays for Nemzeti Bajnokság II club Tiszakécske.

== Career ==
On 7 July 2022, Horváth joined Tiszakécske.

== Club statistics ==
As of 15 May 2021

Appearances and goals by club, season and competition
Club	Season	League			Cup		League Cup		Europe		Total	
Club	Season	Division	Apps	Goals	Apps	Goals	Apps	Goals	Apps	Goals	Apps	Goals
Eger	2011–12	Nemzeti Bajnokság II	18	1	2	3	0	0	0	0	20	4
Eger	2012–13	Nemzeti Bajnokság I	15	4	1	0	6	6	0	0	22	10
Eger	Total		33	5	3	3	6	6	0	0	42	14
Debrecen	2013–14	Nemzeti Bajnokság I	3	1	0	0	0	0	0	0	3	1
Debrecen	Total		3	1	0	0	0	0	0	0	3	1
Kisvárda	2016–17	Nemzeti Bajnokság II	15	2	0	0	0	0	0	0	15	2
Kisvárda	2017–18	Nemzeti Bajnokság II	31	15	2	1	0	0	0	0	33	16
Kisvárda	2018–19	Nemzeti Bajnokság I	30	9	2	1	0	0	0	0	32	10
Kisvárda	2020–21	Nemzeti Bajnokság I	19	1	6	3	0	0	0	0	25	4
Kisvárda	Total		95	27	10	5	0	0	0	0	105	32
Győr	2019–20	Nemzeti Bajnokság II	23	5	3	3	0	0	0	0	26	8
Győr	Total		23	5	3	3	0	0	0	0	26	8
Career total			154	38	16	11	6	6	0	0	176	55
