= 2010–11 Vasas SC season =

Vasas
2010–11 season
- Chief executive: Miklós Vancsa
- Manager: Gianni Dellacasa (until 6 October); András Komjáti (from 7 October)
- Stadium: Illovszky Rudolf Stadion
- Nemzeti Bajnokság I: 11th
- Magyar Kupa: Round of 16
- Ligakupa: Group stage
- Top goalscorer: League: István Ferenczi (11); All: István Ferenczi (18)
- Highest home attendance: 6,000 v Újpest (13 March 2011, Nemzeti Bajnokság I)
- Lowest home attendance: 50 v Paks (23 November 2010, Ligakupa)
- Average home league attendance: 2,360
- Biggest win: 3–0 v Siófok (Home, 27 August 2010, Nemzeti Bajnokság I); 3–0 v Szolnok (Home, 16 October 2010, Nemzeti Bajnokság I)
- Biggest defeat: 0–6 v Zalaegerszeg (Home, 10 November 2010, Magyar Kupa)

The 2010–11 season was Vasas Sport Club's 83rd competitive season, 7th consecutive season in the Nemzeti Bajnokság I and 99th year in existence as a football club. In addition to the domestic league, Vasas participated in that season's editions of the Magyar Kupa and the Ligakupa.

On 6 October 2010, the contract of Gianni Dellacasa was terminated by mutual agreement. A day later, the manager of the Vasas reserve team, András Komjáti was appointed to lead the team.

== Squad ==
Squad at end of season

Note: Flags indicate national team as defined under FIFA eligibility rules; some limited exceptions apply. Players may hold more than one non-FIFA nationality.

No.	Pos.	Nation	Player
1	GK	HUN	Ákos Tulipán
2	DF	HUN	Dávid Görgényi
3	DF	SRB	Dušan Mileusnić
4	DF	SRB	Goran Arnaut
6	DF	HUN	Gábor Kovács
7	MF	HUN	Dávid Kulcsár
8	MF	HUN	Szabolcs Bakos
9	MF	HUN	László Rezes
10	MF	SRB	Čedomir Pavičević
11	MF	HUN	János Lázok
12	GK	HUN	Bence Steer
13	FW	HUN	István Ferenczi
14	MF	SRB	Lazar Arsić
15	MF	HUN	Máté Katona
16	DF	HUN	Marcell Matolcsi
17	FW	MKD	Simeon Hristov
18	FW	HUN	Bence Balogh
19	MF	HUN	Ádám Fürjes

No.	Pos.	Nation	Player
20	FW	HUN	Gergő Beliczky
21	MF	HUN	Norbert Németh
22	DF	HUN	Gábor Polényi
23	FW	HUN	Patrik Csoór
24	DF	HUN	Ádám Présinger
25	FW	HUN	Péter Szilágyi
26	FW	HUN	Csaba Ponczók
27	DF	HUN	Zsolt Balog
28	MF	HUN	Krisztián Lisztes
29	MF	HUN	Patrik Nagy
30	GK	HUN	Zoltán Végh
31	MF	HUN	Roland Mundi
32	MF	HUN	József Piller
33	GK	HUN	Gábor Németh
35	MF	HUN	Ferenc Stranigg
36	DF	SVK	Jozef Gašpar
37	MF	HUN	Dániel Dékány
59	MF	ALG	Karim Benounes

== Transfers ==
=== Transfers in ===
Transfer window	Pos.	No.	Player	From
Summer	FW	–	(Serbia) Ljubomir Arsić	(Serbia) Metalac
Summer	MF	–	(Hungary) Gábor Bogdán	Kaposvár
Summer	DF	4	(Serbia) Goran Arnaut	(Azerbaijan) Inter Baku
Summer	MF	5	(France) Helmi Loussaief	(Tunisia) US Monastir
Summer	FW	9	(Georgia (country)) Vakhtang Pantskhava	Győr
Summer	FW	13	(Hungary) István Ferenczi	Ferencváros
Summer	DF	16	(Hungary) Marcell Matolcsi	Youth team
Summer	FW	18	(Hungary) Bence Balogh	Youth team
Summer	MF	21	(Hungary) Norbert Németh	(Russia) Tom Tomsk
Summer	FW	23	(Hungary) Patrik Csoór	Youth team
Winter	DF	24	(Hungary) Ádám Présinger	Videoton
Winter	MF	28	(Hungary) Krisztián Lisztes	Paks
Winter	GK	33	(Hungary) Gábor Németh	Honvéd

=== Transfers out ===
Transfer window	Pos.	No.	Player	To
Summer	DF	2	(Hungary) Balázs Villám	Released
Summer	GK	12	(Hungary) Attila Bartos	Released
Summer	MF	14	(Hungary) Tamás Tandari	Released
Summer	FW	19	(Hungary) Petar Divić	Pécs
Summer	MF	20	(France) Mamadou Danfa	Released
Summer	MF	22	(Brazil) Bruno Bosi	Released
Summer	MF	23	(Hungary) Péter Kincses	Szigetszentmiklós
Summer	MF	28	(Hungary) István Bognár	Újpest
Winter	MF	–	(Hungary) Krisztián Klavács	(Germany) Rot-Weiss Essen
Winter	DF	–	(Ukraine) Zoltan Silvashi	Released
Winter	MF	5	(France) Helmi Loussaief	(Italy) Spezia
Winter	FW	9	(Georgia (country)) Vakhtang Pantskhava	Released
Winter	MF	25	(Serbia) Saša Dobrić	(Kazakhstan) Vostok

=== Loans in ===
Transfer window	Pos.	No.	Player	From	End date
Summer	FW	7	(Hungary) Ádám Hrepka	MTK	Middle of season
Summer	DF	22	(Hungary) Gábor Polényi	Diósgyőr	End of season
Winter	MF	7	(Hungary) Dávid Kulcsár	Ferencváros	End of season
Winter	MF	9	(Hungary) László Rezes	Debrecen	End of season
Winter	FW	25	(Hungary) Péter Szilágyi	Debrecen	End of season
Winter	FW	26	(Hungary) Csaba Ponczók	Videoton	End of season
Winter	MF	29	(Hungary) Patrik Nagy	(Austria) Rapid Wien II	End of season

=== Loans out ===
Transfer window	Pos.	No.	Player	To	End date
Summer	MF	–	(Hungary) Gábor Bogdán	Kaposvár	End of season
Summer	MF	9	(Hungary) Árpád Majoros	Szigetszentmiklós	End of season
Summer	MF	32	(Hungary) József Piller	Siófok	Middle of season
Winter	FW	5	(Hungary) Péter Szűcs	Budaörs	End of season

== Competitions ==
=== Overview ===
Competition	First match	Last match	Starting round	Final position	Record							
Competition	First match	Last match	Starting round	Final position	Pld	W	D	L	GF	GA	GD	Win %
Nemzeti Bajnokság I	31 July 2010	20 May 2011	Matchday 1	11th	30	11	7	12	34	46	−12	36.67
Magyar Kupa	22 September 2010	2 March 2011	Third round	Round of 16	4	2	0	2	7	12	−5	50.00
Ligakupa	28 July 2010	8 December 2010	Group stage	Group stage	4	2	0	2	7	8	−1	50.00
Total					38	15	7	16	48	66	−18	39.47

Source: Competitions

=== Nemzeti Bajnokság I ===
==== League table ====
Pos	Team	Pld	W	D	L	GF	GA	GD	Pts	Qualification or relegation
9	Győr	30	10	11	9	40	35	+5	41	
10	Honvéd	30	11	7	12	36	39	−3	40	
11	Vasas	30	11	7	12	34	46	−12	40	
12	Kecskemét	30	11	3	16	51	56	−5	36	Qualification for Europa League second qualifying round (Note: Kecskemét have qualified for the second qualifying round of the 2011–12 UEFA Europa League after winning the 2010–11 Hungarian Cup.)
13	Pápa	30	10	5	15	39	52	−13	35	

Source: soccerway.com
Rules for classification: 1st points; 2nd overall wins; 3rd goal difference; 4th goals scored

==== Results summary ====
Overall								Home						Away					
Pld	W	D	L	GF	GA	GD	Pts	W	D	L	GF	GA	GD	W	D	L	GF	GA	GD
30	11	7	12	34	46	−12	40	7	4	4	24	21	+3	4	3	8	10	25	−15

Source: Hungarian Football Federation

==== Results by round ====
Round	1	2	3	4	5	6	7	8	9	10	11	12	13	14	15	16	17	18	19	20	21	22	23	24	25	26	27	28	29
Ground	H	A	H	A	H	H	A	H	H	A	H	A	H	A	A	H	A	H	A	A	H	A	H	A	H	A	H	A	H
Result	W	L	W	D	W	L	L	L	W	L	W	L	L	L	D	D	W	W	D	W	D	W	L	W	W	L	D	L	D
Position	4	8	6	6	4	6	8	12	11	11	9	9	12	14	13	13	13	9	11	8	9	7	9	7	7	7	8	8	11
Points	3	3	6	7	10	10	10	10	13	13	16	16	16	16	17	18	21	24	25	28	29	32	32	35	38	38	39	39	40

Source: Matches
A = Away; H = Home; W = Win; D = Draw; L = Loss

==== Matches ====
31 July 2010 1	Vasas	3–2	Honvéd	Budapest
20:00 CEST (UTC+2)	Gašpar 9', 76'; Arnaut 36'; Pavičević (yellow card) 64'	Report	Akassou (yellow card) 12'; Dieng 16'; Conteh (yellow card) 59'; Botiș (yellow card) 79'; Takács 83'; Sadjo (yellow card) 86'	Stadium: Illovszky Rudolf Stadion; Attendance: 3,500; Referee: Ádám Farkas; Assistant referees: Péter Berettyán, Róbert Horváth; Fourth official: László Varga

8 August 2010 2	Videoton	3–0	Vasas	Székesfehérvár
20:00 CEST (UTC+2)	Lipták (yellow card) 29'; Alves 48'; Elek 50'; Horváth (yellow card) 53'; Vujović 55'; Farkas (yellow card) 85'	Report	Benounes (yellow card) 53'; Mileusnić (red card) 61'	Stadium: Sóstói Stadion; Attendance: 3,456; Referee: János Takács; Assistant referees: Lajos L. Tóth, Gyula Ortó; Fourth official: Csaba Sándor

13 August 2010 3	Vasas	2–1	Győr	Budapest
20:45 CEST (UTC+2)	Ferenczi 4'; Lázok (yellow card) 12'; Bakos (yellow card) 47'; Benounes 62'; Hrepka (yellow card) 78'	Report	Đorđević (yellow card) 3'; Szabó (yellow card) 37'; Stanišić (yellow card) 49'; Tokody 88'	Stadium: Illovszky Rudolf Stadion; Attendance: 2,000; Referee: Péter Solymosi; Assistant referees: Oszkár Lémon, Gábor Takács; Fourth official: Dávid Ákos

21 August 2010 4	Újpest	2–2	Vasas	Budapest
20:00 CEST (UTC+2)	Rajczi 13'; Egerszegi (yellow card) 17'; Pollák (yellow card) 60'; Tisza 62'	Report	Arnaut 45'; Ferenczi 46'; Bakos (yellow card) 67'	Stadium: Szusza Ferenc Stadion; Attendance: 3,827; Referee: Zoltán Iványi; Assistant referees: Zsolt Szpisják, János Medovarszki; Fourth official: Gábor Fajkusz

27 August 2010 5	Vasas	3–0	Siófok	Budapest
17:00 CEST (UTC+2)	Mileusnić (yellow card) 39'; Ferenczi 54', 68', (yellow card) 65'; Katona 88'	Report		Stadium: Illovszky Rudolf Stadion; Attendance: 2,000; Referee: Ádám Farkas; Assistant referees: Péter Berettyán, Róbert Horváth; Fourth official: Róbert Nagy

10 September 2010 6	Vasas	1–3	Kaposvár	Budapest
17:00 CEST (UTC+2)	Arnaut (yellow card) 10'; Bakos (yellow card) 29'; Ferenczi 52', (red card) 55'; Gašpar (red card) 86'	Report	Pavlović 13'; Jawad 14', (yellow card) 69'; Sass (yellow card) 30'; Hegedűs (yellow card) 41'; Grúz (yellow card) 52'; Gujić 68'	Stadium: Illovszky Rudolf Stadion; Attendance: 1,200; Referee: Ferenc Bede; Assistant referees: István Albert, János Medovarszki; Fourth official: Tibor Gyarmati II

16 September 2010 7	MTK	4–0	Vasas	Budapest
19:00 CEST (UTC+2)	Tischler 18', 36'; Gál 28'; Pál 86'	Report	Pavičević (yellow card) 31'; Loussaief (yellow card) 38'; Arnaut (yellow card) 47'	Stadium: Hidegkuti Nándor Stadion; Attendance: 1,500; Referee: János Takács; Assistant referees: Lajos L. Tóth, Péter Berettyán; Fourth official: Csaba Sándor

26 September 2010 8	Vasas	1–3	Ferencváros	Budapest
17:30 CEST (UTC+2)	Pavičević (yellow card) 23'; Lázok 52'	Report	Schembri 21', 30', 53', (yellow card) 31'; Miljković (yellow card) 46'; Maróti (yellow card) 63'	Stadium: Illovszky Rudolf Stadion; Attendance: 3,500; Referee: Viktor Kassai; Assistant referees: Gábor Erős, Tibor Vámos; Fourth official: Sándor Andó-Szabó

3 October 2010 9	Debrecen	3–1	Vasas	Debrecen
17:30 CEST (UTC+2)	Coulibaly 14', 18'; Kabát 68', (yellow card) 81'	Report	Arsić (yellow card) 51'; N. Németh (yellow card) 69'; Ferenczi 79'	Stadium: Oláh Gábor utcai Stadion; Attendance: 5,000; Referee: Ádám Németh; Assistant referees: Zsolt Szpisják, Tibor Vígh; Fourth official: Szabolcs Fenyvesi

16 October 2010 10	Vasas	3–0	Szolnok	Budapest
17:00 CEST (UTC+2)	Pető 23' (o.g.); Lázok 58', 90'; Pantskhava (yellow card) 76'	Report	Hevesi-Tóth (yellow card) 44'; Lengyel (yellow card) 85'	Stadium: Illovszky Rudolf Stadion; Attendance: 1,700; Referee: Szabolcs Szilasi; Assistant referees: Oszkár Lémon, Gábor Takács; Fourth official: Dávid Ákos

22 October 2010 11	Zalaegerszeg	2–1	Vasas	Zalaegerszeg
19:00 CEST (UTC+2)	Rajcomar 72'; Miljatovič 90+2'	Report	Mileusnić 70'	Stadium: ZTE Arena; Attendance: 2,756; Referee: Gábor Oláh; Assistant referees: László Viszokai, Zoltán Kis; Fourth official: Gábor Barna

30 October 2010 12	Vasas	2–1	Haladás	Budapest
17:00 CEST (UTC+2)	Pantskhava 25'; Mileusnić (yellow card) 64'; Pavičević (yellow card) 87'; Németh 90+1'	Report	Sipos 23'; Tóth (yellow card) 35'; Kenesei (yellow card) 83'	Stadium: Illovszky Rudolf Stadion; Attendance: 2,000; Referee: Mihály Fábián; Assistant referees: Dr. Zsolt Varga, János Demeter; Fourth official: Róbert Nagy

6 November 2010 13	Pápa	2–1	Vasas	Pápa
16:00 CET (UTC+1)	Lázok 6' (o.g.); Marić 66'; Farkas (yellow card) 90'	Report	Ferenczi 15'; Balog (yellow card) 69'	Stadium: Perutz Stadion; Attendance: 1,800; Referee: Ádám Farkas; Assistant referees: Attila Kelemen, Tamás Márkus; Fourth official: László Varga

13 November 2010 14	Vasas	2–3	Paks	Budapest
16:00 CET (UTC+1)	Ferenczi 13'; Polényi (yellow card) 25'; N. Németh 36'; Bakos (yellow card) 47'; Balog (yellow card) 68'	Report	Kiss 21'; Sifter (yellow card) 28'; Heffler 50'; Böde 62'; Bartha (yellow card) 89'	Stadium: Illovszky Rudolf Stadion; Attendance: 1,000; Referee: Tamás Bognár; Assistant referees: János Medovarszki, Attila Forgács; Fourth official: László Lovas

20 November 2010 15	Kecskemét	3–1	Vasas	Kecskemét
15:00 CET (UTC+1)	Alempijević 10'; Némedi (yellow card) 40'; Litsingi 60'; Ebala 67'	Report	N. Németh 30'; Gašpar (yellow card) 66'	Stadium: Széktói Stadion; Attendance: 2,500; Referee: Roland Veizer; Assistant referees: Péter Berettyán, Róbert Horváth; Fourth official: Gyöngyi Gaál

26 November 2010 16	Honvéd	0–0	Vasas	Budapest
19:00 CET (UTC+1)		Report	Pavičević (yellow card) 81'	Stadium: Bozsik József Stadion; Attendance: 700; Referee: Zsolt Szabó; Assistant referees: Róbert Kispál, Oszkár Lémon; Fourth official: Gergő Janitz

27 February 2011 17	Vasas	0–0	Videoton	Budapest
17:30 CET (UTC+1)	Arnaut (red card) 60'; Gašpar (yellow card) 65'	Report	Anđić (yellow card) 52'; Sándor (yellow card) 89'	Stadium: Illovszky Rudolf Stadion; Attendance: 2,500; Referee: Mihály Fábián; Assistant referees: Gábor Erős, Dr. Zsolt Varga; Fourth official: Ádám Radványi

5 March 2011 18	Győr	0–1	Vasas	Győr
16:00 CET (UTC+1)	Bouguerra (yellow card) 21'; Copa (yellow card) 71'; Stanišić (yellow card) 78'; Kiss (yellow card) 81'	Report	Gašpar 35'; Rezes (yellow card) 78'; Kovács (yellow card) 86'	Stadium: ETO Park; Attendance: 2,200; Referee: Szabolcs Szilasi; Assistant referees: Gábor Erős, Vencel Tóth II; Fourth official: Dávid Ákos

13 March 2011 19	Vasas	1–0	Újpest	Budapest
17:30 CET (UTC+1)	Rezes 8'; Présinger (red card) 34'; Mileusnić (yellow card) 38'	Report	Jhonnes (yellow card) 56'; Tajthy (yellow card) 64'; Rubus (yellow card) 75'	Stadium: Illovszky Rudolf Stadion; Attendance: 6,000; Referee: Tamás Bognár; Assistant referees: Zsolt Szpisják, István Albert; Fourth official: Szabolcs Szilasi

19 March 2011 20	Siófok	0–0	Vasas	Siófok
15:00 CET (UTC+1)	Mogyorósi (yellow card) 73'	Report	Katona (yellow card) 40'; Arsić (yellow card) 70'	Stadium: Révész Géza utcai Stadion; Attendance: 300; Referee: Zsolt Szabó; Assistant referees: Róbert Kispál, Arnold Kepe; Fourth official: József Erdős

1 April 2011 21	Kaposvár	0–1	Vasas	Kaposvár
17:00 CEST (UTC+2)	K. Kulcsár (yellow card) 29'; Bank (yellow card) 73'	Report	Gašpar (yellow card) 32'; Katona (yellow card) 59'; Ferenczi 82'	Stadium: Rákóczi Stadion; Attendance: 3,000; Referee: Álvaro García Miquel; Assistant referees: Balázs Farkas, Péter Berettyán; Fourth official: Balázs Böcskei

8 April 2011 22	Vasas	1–1	MTK	Budapest
17:00 CEST (UTC+2)	Ferenczi 65'; Arsić (yellow card) 66'	Report	Vukmir (yellow card) 30'; Tischler 37'; Vukadinović (yellow card) 42'; Ladányi (yellow card) 58'; Hegedűs (red card) 63'; Sütő (red card) 90+2'	Stadium: Illovszky Rudolf Stadion; Attendance: 3,000; Referee: Roland Veizer; Assistant referees: László Viszokai, János Demeter; Fourth official: László Varga

15 April 2011 23	Ferencváros	0–1	Vasas	Budapest
19:00 CEST (UTC+2)	Dragóner (yellow card) 70'	Report	Mileusnić (yellow card) 5'; Rezes (yellow card) 14'; Kulcsár (yellow card) 68'; Kovács (yellow card) 74'; Maróti 78' (o.g.); N. Németh (yellow card) 84'	Stadium: Stadion Albert Flórián; Attendance: 5,000; Referee: Álvaro García Miquel; Assistant referees: Zsolt Szpisják, János Medovarszki; Fourth official: Gergely Szőts

23 April 2011 24	Vasas	1–5	Debrecen	Budapest
17:15 CEST (UTC+2)	N. Németh 70', (yellow card) 87'; Kovács (yellow card) 74'	Report	Šimac 24'; Bódi 31', 54'; Coulibaly 47', 81'	Stadium: Illovszky Rudolf Stadion; Attendance: 1,500; Referee: István Vad; Assistant referees: Róbert Kispál, László Viszokai; Fourth official: Krisztián Pánczél

27 April 2011 25	Szolnok	0–1	Vasas	Szolnok
17:00 CEST (UTC+2)	Vukomanović (yellow card) 51'; Jokić (yellow card) 63'; Fitos (yellow card) 85'	Report	Ferenczi 19'; Szilágyi (yellow card) 39'; Gašpar (yellow card) 61'; Ponczók (yellow card) 80'	Stadium: Tiszaligeti Stadion; Attendance: 1,000; Referee: János Takács; Assistant referees: Lajos L. Tóth, Gábor Kormányos II; Fourth official: Csaba Sándor

30 April 2011 26	Vasas	2–0	Zalaegerszeg	Budapest
15:00 CEST (UTC+2)	Lisztes 38'; Kulcsár (yellow card) 39'; Mileusnić (yellow card) 51'; Ponczók 64'	Report	Panikvar (yellow card) 78'	Stadium: Illovszky Rudolf Stadion; Attendance: 2,500; Referee: Ádám Farkas; Assistant referees: Péter Berettyán, Róbert Horváth; Fourth official: Eszter Urbán

7 May 2011 27	Haladás	3–0	Vasas	Szombathely
19:00 CEST (UTC+2)	Oross 31', 35', 90'; Kenesei (yellow card) 86'	Report	N. Németh (yellow card) 77'	Stadium: Rohonci út Attendance: 6,000; Referee: Péter Solymosi; Assistant referees: Balázs Farkas, Tamás Péter; Fourth official: Tibor Gyarmati II

10 May 2011 28	Vasas	1–1	Pápa	Budapest
18:00 CEST (UTC+2)	Beliczky 67'; Rezes (yellow card) 80'; Lisztes (yellow card) 83'	Report	S. Nagy (yellow card) 31'; Bali 87'	Stadium: Illovszky Rudolf Stadion; Attendance: 2,000; Referee: Khamis Mohamed Al Kuwari (Qatar); Assistant referees: Róbert Kispál (Hungary), Taleb Salem Al Marri (Qatar); Fourth official: Balázs Böcskei (Hungary)

13 May 2011 29	Paks	3–0	Vasas	Paks
17:00 CEST (UTC+2)	Böde 43', 68', 71'; Magasföldi (yellow card) 46'; Sifter (yellow card) 57'	Report	Kovács (yellow card) 55'; P. Nagy (yellow card) 77'	Stadium: Fehérvári úti Stadion; Attendance: 2,600; Referee: Tamás Bognár; Assistant referees: Dr. Zsolt Varga, Tamás Márkus; Fourth official: Róbert Nagy

20 May 2011 30	Vasas	1–1	Kecskemét	Budapest
17:00 CEST (UTC+2)	Ponczók 9'; Mileusnić (yellow card) 76'	Report	Kéthévoama (yellow card) 36'; Dosso 50'; Ebala (yellow card) 76'; Mohl (yellow card) 89'	Stadium: Illovszky Rudolf Stadion; Attendance: 1,000; Referee: J. Zoltán Kovács; Assistant referees: Balázs Huszár, Tamás Péter; Fourth official: Csaba Pintér

=== Magyar Kupa ===
22 September 2010 Third round	Tököl	2–4	Vasas	Tököl
15:30 CEST (UTC+2)	Radnics 29'; Dévai (yellow card) 73'; Filó (yellow card) 78', (goal) 90'	Report	Németh 5'; Ferenczi 9', 37', 55'; Kovács (red card) 24'; Hrepka (yellow card) 61'	Stadium: Sport utcai Sportpálya; Attendance: 500; Referee: Ádám Radványi; Assistant referees: Tamás Péter, Roland Hofbauer

27 October 2010 Round of 32	Tisza Volán	1–3	Vasas	Szeged
14:30 CEST (UTC+2)	Völgyi (yellow card) 30'; Dargó 90'	Report	Hrepka 11'; Benounes 57'; Katona (yellow card) 57'; Lázok 60'; Mileusnić (yellow card) 67'	Stadium: Felső Tisza-parti Stadion; Attendance: 800; Referee: József Erdős; Assistant referees: Attila Forgács, László Sebestyén

==== Round of 16 ====
10 November 2010 First leg	Vasas	0–6	Zalaegerszeg	Budapest
17:00 CET (UTC+1)	Pavičević (yellow card) 29'; Hrepka (yellow card) 39'; Beliczky (yellow card) 70'	Report	Delić 14'; Simon 25', 69', 83'; Illés (yellow card) 55'; Kamber 61'; Szalai 86'	Stadium: Illovszky Rudolf Stadion; Attendance: 500; Referee: Álvaro García Miquel; Assistant referees: Zsolt Szpisják, Tibor Vígh

2 March 2011 Second leg	Zalaegerszeg	3–0 (9–0 agg.)	Vasas	Zalaegerszeg
14:00 CET (UTC+1)	Simon 3', 10'; Cebara 39'; Barna (yellow card) 67'	Report	Matolcsi (yellow card) 30'	Stadium: ZTE Arena; Attendance: 700; Referee: Eszter Urbán; Assistant referees: Attila Kelemen, István Tóth
Note: Zalaegerszeg won 9–0 on aggregate.

=== Ligakupa ===
==== Group stage ====
Pos	Team	Pld	W	D	L	GF	GA	GD	Pts	Qualification	PAK	VAS	MTK
1	Paks	4	3	0	1	12	5	+7	9	Advance to knockout phase	—	2–0	4–0
2	Vasas	4	2	0	2	7	8	−1	6		1–4	—	4–1
3	MTK	4	1	0	3	6	12	−6	3		4–2	1–2	—

28 July 2010 1	Vasas	4–1	MTK	Budapest
15:00 CEST (UTC+2)	Pavičević 9'; Ferenczi 11', 59'; Benounes 38'; Bakos (yellow card) 71'	Report	Skriba 35', (yellow card) 55'; Macura (yellow card) 53'	Stadium: Illovszky Rudolf Stadion; Attendance: 300; Referee: Tamás Bognár; Assistant referees: Attila Kelemen, Gábor Varga Jr.

3 November 2010 2	Paks	2–0	Vasas	Paks
13:00 CET (UTC+1)	Tóth B. 32'; Lisztes 60'	Report	Pavičević (yellow card) 81'	Stadium: Fehérvári úti Stadion; Attendance: 200; Referee: Szabolcs Fenyvesi; Assistant referees: Dániel Szalai, László Sebestyén

23 November 2010 3	Vasas	1–4	Paks	Budapest
13:00 CET (UTC+1)	Pantskhava 39'; G. Kovács (yellow card) 52'	Report	Gévay (yellow card) 33'; Bohner 35'; Nagy 47'; Vári 52'; Lisztes 67'; Szabó (yellow card) 90'	Stadium: Illovszky Rudolf Stadion; Attendance: 50; Referee: Ádám Radványi; Assistant referees: István Tóth, Gábor Varga Jr.

8 December 2010 4	MTK	1–2	Vasas	Budapest
13:00 CET (UTC+1)	Eppel 61'; Molnár (yellow card) 82'	Report	Ferenczi 3', 69'; Katona (yellow card) 37'	Stadium: Promontor utcai Stadion; Attendance: 50; Referee: János Takács; Assistant referees: Lajos L. Tóth, Róbert Horváth

== Statistics ==
=== Overall ===
Appearances (Apps) numbers are for appearances in competitive games only, including sub appearances.
Source: Competitions

No.	Player	Pos.	Nemzeti Bajnokság I				Magyar Kupa				Ligakupa				Total			
No.	Player	Pos.	Apps	Goal	Yellow card	Red card	Apps	Goal	Yellow card	Red card	Apps	Goal	Yellow card	Red card	Apps	Goal	Yellow card	Red card
1	(Hungary) Ákos Tulipán	GK					1				2				3			
2	(Hungary) Dávid Görgényi	DF					1				3				4			
3	(Serbia) Dušan Mileusnić	DF	25	1	6	1	3		1		1				29	1	7	1
4	(Serbia) Goran Arnaut	DF	15	2	2	1	2				2				19	2	2	1
5	(France) Helmi Loussaief	MF	3		1		2				3				8		1	
6	(Hungary) Gábor Kovács	DF	22		4		1			1	4		1		27		5	1
7	(Hungary) Ádám Hrepka	FW	7		1		3	1	2		2				12	1	3	
7	(Hungary) Dávid Kulcsár	MF	14		2										14		2	
8	(Hungary) Szabolcs Bakos	MF	14		4		3				3		1		20		5	
9	(Hungary) Árpád Majoros	MF									1				1			
9	(Georgia (country)) Vakhtang Pantskhava	FW	11	1	1		1				1	1			13	2	1	
9	(Hungary) László Rezes	MF	12	1	3										12	1	3	
10	(Serbia) Čedomir Pavičević	MF	16		5		4		1		2	1	1		22	1	7	
11	(Hungary) János Lázok	MF	29	3	1		2	1			1				32	4	1	
12	(Hungary) Bence Steer	GK																
13	(Hungary) István Ferenczi	FW	24	11	1	1	2	3			3	4			29	18	1	1
14	(Serbia) Lazar Arsić	MF	22		3		2				2				26		3	
15	(Hungary) Máté Katona	MF	24	1	2		3		1		4		1		31	1	4	
16	(Hungary) Marcell Matolcsi	DF					1		1						1		1	
17	(North Macedonia) Simeon Hristov	FW					1				3				4			
18	(Hungary) Bence Balogh	FW									1				1			
19	(Hungary) Ádám Fürjes	MF									1				1			
19	(Hungary) Salem Reidan	MF																
20	(Hungary) Gergő Beliczky	FW	16	1			2		1		4				22	1	1	
21	(Hungary) Norbert Németh	MF	14	4	4		2	1			1				17	5	4	
22	(Hungary) Gábor Polényi	DF	9		1		1				3				13		1	
23	(Hungary) Patrik Csoór	FW					1				1				2			
24	(Hungary) Ádám Présinger	DF	6			1									6			1
25	(Serbia) Saša Dobrić	MF	3				2				1				6			
25	(Hungary) Péter Szilágyi	FW	9		1										9		1	
26	(Hungary) Csaba Ponczók	FW	7	2	1										7	2	1	
27	(Hungary) Zsolt Balog	DF	24		2		3				2				29		2	
28	(Hungary) Krisztián Lisztes	MF	14	1	1										14	1	1	
29	(Hungary) Patrik Nagy	MF	1		1										1		1	
30	(Hungary) Zoltán Végh	GK	17				3				2				22			
31	(Hungary) Roland Mundi	MF	9				3				4				16			
33	(Hungary) Gábor Németh	GK	13												13			
35	(Hungary) Ferenc Stranigg	MF					1								1			
36	(Slovakia) Jozef Gašpar	DF	28	3	4	1	2				2				32	3	4	1
37	(Hungary) Dániel Dékány	FW					1								1			
59	(Algeria) Karim Benounes	MF	7	1	1		2	1			1	1			10	3	1	
Own goals				2												2		
Totals				34	52	5		7	7	1		7	4			48	63	6

=== Hat-tricks ===
No.	Player	Against	Result	Date	Competition
13	(Hungary) István Ferenczi	Tököl (A)	4–2	22 September 2010	Magyar Kupa

=== Clean sheets ===
			Clean sheets			
No.	Player	Games Played	Nemzeti Bajnokság I	Magyar Kupa	Ligakupa	Total
33	(Hungary) Gábor Németh	13	8			8
30	(Hungary) Zoltán Végh	22	3			3
1	(Hungary) Ákos Tulipán	3				0
12	(Hungary) Bence Steer	0				0
Totals			8			8
