= 2008–09 Vasas SC season =

Vasas
2008–09 season
- Manager: Géza Mészöly
- Stadium: Illovszky Rudolf Stadion
- Nemzeti Bajnokság I: 10th
- Magyar Kupa: Round of 32
- Ligakupa: Quarter-finals
- Highest home attendance: 5,000 (multiple Nemzeti Bajnokság I matches)
- Lowest home attendance: 50 v Vác-Újbuda (29 November 20, Ligakupa)
- Average home league attendance: 2,267
- Biggest win: 7–1 v Vác-Újbuda (Home, 29 November 2008, Ligakupa)
- Biggest defeat: 0–4 v MTK (Home, 9 August 2008, Nemzeti Bajnokság I); 0–4 v Kaposvár (Away, 8 November 2008, Nemzeti Bajnokság I); 0–4 v Nyíregyháza (Away, 11 February 2009, Ligakupa); 1–5 v Honvéd (Away, 5 March 2009, Ligakupa)

The 2008–09 season was Vasas Sport Club's 81st competitive season, 5th consecutive season in the Nemzeti Bajnokság I and 103rd season in existence as a football club. In addition to the domestic league, Vasas participated in that season's editions of the Magyar Kupa and the Ligakupa.

== Squad ==
Squad at end of season

Note: Flags indicate national team as defined under FIFA eligibility rules; some limited exceptions apply. Players may hold more than one non-FIFA nationality.

No.	Pos.	Nation	Player
1	GK	HUN	Ákos Tulipán
2	DF	HUN	Balázs Villám
3	DF	HUN	Barna Papucsek
4	DF	HUN	Márton Kiss
6	DF	SRB	Nenad Nikolić
7	MF	HUN	Balázs B. Tóth
9	MF	HUN	Zsolt Laczkó
10	MF	SRB	Čedomir Pavičević
11	MF	HUN	János Lázok
12	GK	HUN	Attila Bartos
14	MF	MNE	Vladimir Vujović
15	MF	HUN	Máté Katona
16	MF	HUN	Zsolt Merczel
17	DF	SRB	Ognjen Paripović

No.	Pos.	Nation	Player
18	FW	HUN	Péter Orosz
19	FW	SRB	Petar Divić
20	MF	HUN	Tamás Somorjai
21	DF	HUN	András Tóth
22	FW	SRB	Ljubiša Vukelja
25	MF	SRB	Saša Dobrić
26	GK	HUN	Csaba Borszéki
27	DF	HUN	Zsolt Balog
28	DF	POL	Mariusz Unierzyski
29	FW	HUN	László Szűcs
30	FW	HUN	Thomas Sowunmi
31	MF	HUN	Roland Mundi
32	MF	HUN	József Piller
33	GK	HUN	Gábor Németh

== Competitions ==
=== Overview ===
Competition	First match	Last match	Starting round	Final position	Record							
Competition	First match	Last match	Starting round	Final position	Pld	W	D	L	GF	GA	GD	Win %
Nemzeti Bajnokság I	29 July 2008	30 May 2009	Matchday 1	10th	30	11	5	14	42	52	−10	36.67
Magyar Kupa	3 September 2008	24 September 2008	Third round	Round of 32	2	1	0	1	5	4	+1	50.00
Ligakupa	1 October 2008	25 March 2009	Group stage	Quarter-finals	12	6	4	2	32	19	+13	50.00
Total					44	18	9	17	79	75	+4	40.91

Source: Competitions

=== Nemzeti Bajnokság I ===
==== League table ====
Pos	Team	Pld	W	D	L	GF	GA	GD	Pts
8	Győr	30	11	10	9	57	41	+16	43
9	Kaposvár	30	11	7	12	51	46	+5	40
10	Vasas	30	11	5	14	42	52	−10	38
11	Paks	30	9	8	13	38	51	−13	35
12	Diósgyőr	30	9	6	15	29	45	−16	33

Source: soccerway.com
Rules for classification: 1st points; 2nd overall wins; 3rd goal difference; 4th goals scored

==== Results summary ====
Overall								Home						Away					
Pld	W	D	L	GF	GA	GD	Pts	W	D	L	GF	GA	GD	W	D	L	GF	GA	GD
30	11	5	14	42	52	−10	38	8	3	4	31	22	+9	3	2	10	11	30	−19

Source: Hungarian Football Federation

==== Results by round ====
Round	1	2	3	4	5	6	7	8	9	10	11	12	13	14	15	16	17	18	19	20	21	22	23	24	25	26	27	28	29	30
Ground	A	H	H	A	H	A	H	A	H	A	H	A	H	A	H	H	A	A	H	A	H	A	H	A	H	A	H	A	H	A
Result	W	W	L	W	W	L	W	L	W	L	W	W	W	L	D	W	L	L	L	L	D	L	L	L	L	D	D	D	W	L
Position	7	2	6	3	1	4	2	4	3	4	4	3	3	3	3	3	3	3	3	6	6	6	7	10	10	9	10	10	9	10
Points	3	6	6	9	12	12	15	15	18	18	21	24	27	27	28	31	31	31	31	31	32	32	32	32	32	33	34	35	38	38

Source: Matches
A = Away; H = Home; W = Win; D = Draw; L = Loss

==== Matches ====
29 July 2008 1	Honvéd	0–1	Vasas	Budapest
20:00 CEST (UTC+2)	Smiljanić (yellow card) 29'; Dobos (penalty missed) 68'	Report	Dobrić (yellow card) 47'; Paripović (yellow card) 67'; Lázok 81'; A. Tóth (red card) 86'	Stadium: Bozsik József Stadion; Attendance: 1,500; Referee: Mihály Fábián; Assistant referees: Gyula Ortó, Zoltán Pápai; Fourth official: Róbert Nagy

1 August 2008 2	Vasas	4–2	Újpest	Budapest
19:00 CEST (UTC+2)	Dobrić 11'; N. Németh 12', (yellow card) 61'; Paripović (yellow card) 36'; Divić 47'; Piller (yellow card) 47'; Lázok 68'	Report	Vaskó (yellow card) 27', (goal) 82'; Božić (yellow card) 39'; Kabát 61'; Lipták (yellow card) 68'	Stadium: Illovszky Rudolf Stadion; Attendance: 5,000; Referee: István Vad; Assistant referees: Vencel Tóth II, Balázs Farkas; Fourth official: József Erdős

9 August 2008 3	Vasas	0–4	MTK	Budapest
20:00 CEST (UTC+2)	Piller (yellow card) 17'; N. Németh (yellow card) 56'; Pavičević (yellow card) 67'; Paripović (yellow card) 75'	Report	Urbán 8'; Zsidai (yellow card) 21'; Pál 30'; Lambulić (red card) 37'; Kecskés 52'; Hrepka 74'	Stadium: Illovszky Rudolf Stadion; Attendance: 3,000; Referee: Zoltán Iványi; Assistant referees: István Albert, Zoltán Pápai; Fourth official: Ádám Radványi

16 August 2008 4	Siófok	0–1	Vasas	Siófok
20:00 CEST (UTC+2)	At. Horváth (yellow card) 29'; G. Hegedűs (yellow card) 31'; Forgács (yellow card) 84'; Sütő (red card) 90+1'	Report	B. Tóth (yellow card) 65'; Sowunmi 81'	Stadium: Révész Géza utcai Stadion; Attendance: 2,000; Referee: Szabolcs Szilasi; Assistant referees: György Ring, Zsolt Márton; Fourth official: Dávid Ákos

22 August 2008 5	Vasas	3–2	Diósgyőr	Budapest
19:00 CEST (UTC+2)	Divić 22'; Lázok 41'; N. Németh 49'; Gyánó (yellow card) 90'	Report	Mi. Tóth (yellow card) 72', (goal) 83'; Pelecaci 90'	Stadium: Illovszky Rudolf Stadion; Attendance: 1,500; Referee: Gergely Sulyok; Assistant referees: Attila Kelemen, Zsolt Butkai; Fourth official: Ádám Farkas

30 August 2008 6	Haladás	1–0	Vasas	Szombathely
20:00 CEST (UTC+2)	Rajos 34'	Report	Z. Balog (yellow card) 69'	Stadium: Rohonci út Attendance: 8,000; Referee: Tamás Arany; Assistant referees: Zsolt Márton, István Iványi; Fourth official: Balázs Böcskei

13 September 2008 7	Vasas	5–0	Paks	Budapest
20:00 CEST (UTC+2)	A. Tóth (red card) 3'; Dobrić 24'; N. Németh 47'; Divić 65', 70'; B. Tóth (yellow card) 76'; Gyánó 82', (yellow card) 83'	Report	Vári (yellow card) 19'; Éger (yellow card) 47'; Z. Molnár (red card) 60'	Stadium: Illovszky Rudolf Stadion; Attendance: 1,500; Referee: Mihály Fábián; Assistant referees: Dr. Zsolt Varga, Zoltán Pápai; Fourth official: Ádám Radványi

20 September 2008 8	Debrecen	4–1	Vasas	Debrecen
15:00 CEST (UTC+2)	Z. Takács (yellow card) 37'; Poleksić (yellow card) 54'; L. Oláh 60', 67'; Dudu 72'; P. Szakály 80'	Report	N. Németh (penalty missed) 1', (yellow card) 69'; Paripović (yellow card) 21'; Dobrić 26', (yellow card) 74'; Pavičević (yellow card) 45'; Piller (yellow card) 86'	Stadium: Oláh Gábor utcai Stadion; Attendance: 2,600; Referee: Péter Solymosi; Assistant referees: Gábor Takács, Balázs Farkas; Fourth official: Gergő Janitz

27 September 2008 9	Vasas	3–1	Zalaegerszeg	Budapest
19:00 CEST (UTC+2)	Unierzyski 49'; Z. Balog (yellow card) 57'; N. Németh (yellow card) 59', (goal) 74'; Dobrić 72'; Sowunmi (yellow card) 81'	Report	P. Máté I (yellow card) 45'; Szamosi (yellow card) 50'; Méyé 64'; Hajdú (yellow card) 77'	Stadium: Illovszky Rudolf Stadion; Attendance: 5,000; Referee: István Vad; Assistant referees: Vencel Tóth II, György Ring; Fourth official: Gergely Szőts

4 October 2008 10	Kecskemét	2–0	Vasas	Kecskemét
18:00 CEST (UTC+2)	I. Farkas 15'; Čukić 39'; Montvai (yellow card) 75'	Report	Z. Balog (yellow card) 51'; Paripović (yellow card) 75'	Stadium: Széktói Stadion; Attendance: 3,500; Referee: Mihály Fábián; Assistant referees: Gyula Ortó, Zoltán Pápai; Fourth official: Ádám Radványi

17 October 2008 11	Vasas	2–1	Győr	Budapest
19:00 CEST (UTC+2)	Dobrić (yellow card) 47'; N. Németh 61'; A. Tóth 78'	Report	Bajzát 4'; Völgyi (yellow card) 42'; Fomumbod (yellow card) 63'	Stadium: Illovszky Rudolf Stadion; Attendance: 1,200; Referee: Zoltán Iványi; Assistant referees: István Albert, János Medovarszki; Fourth official: Gergely Szőts

25 October 2008 12	Rákospalota	0–2	Vasas	Budapest
18:00 CEST (UTC+2)	Kapcsos (yellow card) 3'; Sallai (yellow card) 23'; Cseri (yellow card) 78'	Report	Paripović (yellow card) 28'; Divić 52'; N. Németh 88'	Stadium: Budai II. László Stadion; Attendance: 1,500; Referee: Ferenc Bede; Assistant referees: Dr. Péter Kovács, Zsolt Márton; Fourth official: Tibor Gyarmati II

1 November 2008 13	Vasas	4–1	Fehérvár	Budapest
15:00 CET (UTC+1)	Divić 30', 67'; B. Tóth 45'; N. Németh 87'	Report	Pavličić 40'	Stadium: Illovszky Rudolf Stadion; Attendance: 2,200; Referee: Péter Solymosi; Assistant referees: György Ring, Gábor Takács; Fourth official: Dávid Ákos

8 November 2008 14	Kaposvár	4–0	Vasas	Kaposvár
18:00 CET (UTC+1)	Grúz 13'; Kovácsevics (yellow card) 18'; Zahorecz (yellow card) 38'; Nem. Nikolić 45', 67'; Obrić (yellow card) 84'; Reszli 90'	Report	Divić (yellow card) 33'; Sowunmi (yellow card) 42'; Pavičević (yellow card) 61'; A. Tóth (yellow card) 81'; Gyánó (yellow card) 84'	Stadium: Rákóczi Stadion; Attendance: 3,500; Referee: István Vad; Assistant referees: Zsolt Butkai, Zoltán Szalai; Fourth official: Csaba Molnár

15 November 2008 15	Vasas	1–1	Nyíregyháza	Budapest
18:00 CET (UTC+1)	N. Németh 9'; Paripović (yellow card) 17'; Laczkó (yellow card) 42'	Report	Ramos (yellow card) 37'; Odrobéna (yellow card) 85', (goal) 89'	Stadium: Illovszky Rudolf Stadion; Attendance: 3,300; Referee: Mihály Fábián; Assistant referees: Zoltán Pápai, János Demeter; Fourth official: Róbert Nagy

21 February 2009 16	Vasas	3–1	Honvéd	Budapest
15:00 CET (UTC+1)	A. Tóth 5'; N. Németh 34', (yellow card) 90'; B. Tóth 41'; Dobrić (yellow card) 80'; Piller (red card) 88'	Report	Á. Takács (yellow card) 20'; Lungu (yellow card) 25'; Hercegfalvi 60'	Stadium: Illovszky Rudolf Stadion; Attendance: 2,000; Referee: István Vad; Assistant referees: György Ring, Vencel Tóth II; Fourth official: József Erdős

7 March 2009 18	MTK	3–0	Vasas	Budapest
15:00 CET (UTC+1)	J. Kanta 49' (pen.); Á. Pintér (yellow card) 50'; Lencse (yellow card) 83'; Urbán 86'; Hrepka 89'	Report	Dobrić (yellow card) 30'; Laczkó (red card) 36'; Paripović (red card) 71'	Stadium: Hidegkuti Nándor Stadion; Attendance: 900; Referee: Mihály Fábián; Assistant referees: Dr. Zsolt Varga, Zoltán Pápai; Fourth official: Róbert Nagy

14 March 2009 19	Vasas	0–1	Siófok	Budapest
18:00 CET (UTC+1)	Piller (yellow card) 52'	Report	Kogler 50'; Sütő (yellow card) 72'	Stadium: Illovszky Rudolf Stadion; Attendance: 3,000; Referee: Gergely Sulyok; Assistant referees: Tibor Vámos, Zoltán Szalai; Fourth official: Gábor Oláh

22 March 2009 20	Diósgyőr	1–0	Vasas	Miskolc
17:30 CET (UTC+1)	Višković (yellow card) 19'; Bokros (yellow card) 73'; Honma 88'	Report		Stadium: Diósgyőri Stadion; Attendance: 3,500; Referee: Péter Solymosi; Assistant referees: Gábor Takács, István Tóth; Fourth official: Gábor Bendik

5 April 2009 21	Vasas	1–1	Haladás	Budapest
17:30 CEST (UTC+2)	Dobrić (yellow card) 13'; Somorjai (yellow card) 33'; Paripović (red card) 40'; Unierzyski (yellow card) 58'; Vukelja 71'	Report	Kenesei 41'; Zs. Kovács (yellow card) 45'; N. Sipos (yellow card) 53'; N. Tóth (yellow card) 77'	Stadium: Illovszky Rudolf Stadion; Attendance: 2,000; Referee: István Mészáros; Assistant referees: Zsolt Szpisják, János Medovarszki; Fourth official: Balázs Böcskei

11 April 2009 22	Paks	3–0	Vasas	Paks
19:00 CEST (UTC+2)	J. Szabó (yellow card) 8'; Böde (yellow card) 26'; Tököli 40', 65'; T. Kiss I 47'; Le. Horváth (yellow card) 50'	Report	Laczkó (yellow card) 22'; Vujović (yellow card) 40'; Orosz (yellow card) 58'	Stadium: Fehérvári úti Stadion; Attendance: 2,187; Referee: Zoltán Iványi; Assistant referees: István Albert, Gábor Kormányos II; Fourth official: Gábor Fajkusz

19 April 2009 23	Vasas	1–3	Debrecen	Budapest
17:30 CEST (UTC+2)	B. Tóth 54'; Laczkó (yellow card) 80'; Unierzyski (yellow card) 82'	Report	Rudolf 16', 33'; Bernáth (yellow card) 53'; P. Szilágyi 70'	Stadium: Illovszky Rudolf Stadion; Attendance: 1,000; Referee: Sándor Andó-Szabó; Assistant referees: Róbert Kispál, Balázs Farkas; Fourth official: Gábor Oláh

25 April 2009 24	Zalaegerszeg	3–1	Vasas	Zalaegerszeg
19:00 CEST (UTC+2)	Waltner 24' (pen.); Balázs 68', 71'; Kocsárdi (red card) 83'	Report	Paripović (red card) 14'; R. Varga 19' (o.g.); Pavičević (yellow card) 33'; Vujović (yellow card) 60'	Stadium: ZTE Arena; Attendance: 4,182; Referee: Szabolcs Szilasi; Assistant referees: Oszkár Lémon, Gábor Takács; Fourth official: Dávid Ákos

28 April 2009 25	Vasas	1–2	Kecskemét	Budapest
19:00 CEST (UTC+2)	B. Tóth (yellow card) 35'; Sowunmi 50'; Villám (yellow card) 74'; Vujović (yellow card) 82'	Report	Čukić 23', (yellow card) 85'; Mbengono 41'; Némedi (yellow card) 79'	Stadium: Stadion Rudolf Illovszky; Attendance: 800; Referee: Ferenc Bede; Assistant referees: Zsolt Butkai, Zoltán Szalai; Fourth official: Gergő Király

1 May 2009 26	Győr	1–1	Vasas	Győr
19:00 CEST (UTC+2)	Aleksidze 3'; Böőr (yellow card) 73'; Bajzát (yellow card) 87'; Stark (yellow card) 90'	Report	Dobrić (yellow card) 32'; B. Tóth (yellow card) 47'; Vujović (yellow card) 57', (goal) 81'	Stadium: ETO Park; Attendance: 12,000; Referee: Péter Solymosi; Assistant referees: Arnold Kepe, Szabolcs Deutsch; Fourth official: Norbert Kiss

6 May 2009 17	Újpest	3–1	Vasas	Budapest
18:00 CEST (UTC+2)	Tisza 14'; Simek (red card) 17'; Kabát 22', 45'; Pollák (yellow card) 35'; Malone (yellow card) 77'	Report	Dobrić 4'; G. Németh (yellow card) 21'; Vujović (yellow card) 55'; Laczkó (red card) 67'	Stadium: Szusza Ferenc Stadion; Attendance: 3,168; Referee: Zsolt Szabó; Assistant referees: Róbert Kispál, Tibor Vígh; Fourth official: Tibor Gyarmati II
Note: The matches of the 17th round were postponed due to HFF decision.

9 May 2009 27	Vasas	1–1	Rákospalota	Budapest
19:00 CEST (UTC+2)	Sowunmi 33'; Vukelja (yellow card) 71'; B. Tóth (yellow card) 83'	Report	Sallai (yellow card) 23'; Ambrusz (yellow card) 35'; Dancs (yellow card) 62'; Pomper (red card) 84'; Z. Varga II 90+2'	Stadium: Illovszky Rudolf Stadion; Attendance: 1,500; Referee: Ádám Farkas; Assistant referees: Lajos L. Tóth, Péter Berettyán; Fourth official: Gergely Szőts

16 May 2009 28	Fehérvár	2–2	Vasas	Székesfehérvár
19:00 CEST (UTC+2)	Vujović 24'; Radović (yellow card) 25'; G. Horváth II (yellow card) 56'; Anđić 64'	Report	Piller (yellow card) 4', (goal) 56' (pen.); Vukelja 32'; Villám (yellow card) 72'; A. Tóth (yellow card) 88'	Stadium: Sóstói Stadion; Attendance: 1,672; Referee: János Takács; Assistant referees: Dr. Zsolt Varga, Zoltán Pápai; Fourth official: László Varga

23 May 2009 29	Vasas	2–1	Kaposvár	Budapest
19:00 CEST (UTC+2)	Somorjai 38' (pen.), (yellow card) 55'; Laczkó (yellow card) 60'; Beliczky 84'	Report	Petrók (yellow card) 10'; Nem. Nikolić 27'; Obrić (yellow card) 37'; Grúz (yellow card) 57'	Stadium: Illovszky Rudolf Stadion; Attendance: 1,000; Referee: Roland Veizer; Assistant referees: Péter Berettyán, Róbert Horváth; Fourth official: HJózsef Erdős

30 May 2009 30	Nyíregyháza	3–1	Vasas	Nyíregyháza
19:00 CEST (UTC+2)	Goia 8'; Odrobéna (yellow card) 50'; Stojkov 64', 66'	Report	Unierzyski (yellow card) 26'; Z. Balog (yellow card) 48'; A. Tóth 52', (yellow card) 71'	Stadium: Városi Stadion; Attendance: 2,000; Referee: Ádám Németh; Assistant referees: Vencel Tóth II, Tamás Márkus; Fourth official: Gergő Janitz

=== Magyar Kupa ===
3 September 2008 Third round	Dunaharaszti	2–4	Vasas	Dunaharaszti
15:30 CEST (UTC+2)	Piroska 2x	Report	Divić; Dobrić; Gyánó 2x	Stadium: Dunaharaszti Sportpálya; Attendance: 200; Referee: Ferenc Szöllősi; Assistant referees: Tibor Vígh, János Agócs

24 September 2008 Round of 32	Kazincbarcika	2–1	Vasas	Kazincbarcika
15:30 CEST (UTC+2)	P. Kovács II (yellow card) 11'; Binder 35', 56'; Hanász (yellow card) 72'	Report	Lázok 73'; Pavičević (red card) 90+1'	Stadium: Kazincbarcikai Sportközpont; Attendance: 2,000; Referee: Roland Veizer; Assistant referees: István Tóth, Róbert Horváth

=== Ligakupa ===
==== Group stage ====
Pos	Team	Pld	W	D	L	GF	GA	GD	Pts	Qualification	VAS	DIO	DEB	NYI	BOC	VAC
1	Vasas	10	6	3	1	31	14	+17	21	Advance to knockout phase	—	3–0	2–1	4–1	1–1	7–1
2	Diósgyőr	10	6	3	1	22	9	+13	21	Advance to knockout phase	2–2	—	4–1	3–1	5–0	4–1
3	Debrecen	10	3	3	4	22	19	+3	12		3–3	0–0	—	2–1	5–1	4–0
4	Nyíregyháza	10	3	2	5	19	18	+1	11		4–0	1–1	2–2	—	4–0	3–0
5	Bőcs	10	3	1	6	15	27	−12	10		1–5	0–1	3–2	2–0	—	5–0
6	Vác-Újbuda	10	3	0	7	13	35	−22	9		0–4	0–2	3–2	4–2	4–2	—

Source: HFF

1 October 2008 1	Vasas	1–1	Bőcs	Budapest
16:00 CEST (UTC+2)	Sowunmi 34'	Report	Török 39'	Stadium: Illovszky Rudolf Stadion; Attendance: 150; Referee: J. Zoltán Kovács; Assistant referees: Dr. Péter Hegyi, Gábor Kormányos II

22 October 2008 2	Vác-Újbuda	0–4	Vasas	Vác
14:00 CEST (UTC+2)	P. Farkas (yellow card) 51'	Report	Bartos (red card) 20'; Gyánó 34', 36', 49'; Mundi 85'; Piller (yellow card) 87'	Stadium: Ligeti Stadion; Attendance: 150; Referee: Gergő Király; Assistant referees: Gábor Oláh, Zoltán Szalai

29 October 2008 3	Vasas	2–1	Debrecen	Budapest
16:00 CET (UTC+1)	Gyánó 44'; B. Tóth 76'; Laczkó (yellow card) 87'	Report	Á. Németh (yellow card) 18'; Dudu (yellow card) 40'; P. Szilágyi 67'; Spitzmüller (yellow card) 77'	Stadium: Illovszky Rudolf Stadion; Attendance: 150; Referee: Ádám Farkas; Assistant referees: Gyula Fehér, János Demeter

5 November 2008 4	Diósgyőr	2–2	Vasas	Miskolc
16:00 CET (UTC+1)	V. Sebők 18'; Z. Pintér (yellow card) 23'; Trbović (yellow card) 39'; Tchana (yellow card) 50'; P. Takács 53' (pen.), (yellow card) 61'; Menyhért (yellow card) 90+2'	Report	Gyánó 28'; Kelemen (yellow card) 28', (goal) 42'; Papucsek (yellow card) 71'	Stadium: Diósgyőri Stadion; Attendance: 300; Referee: Gergely Szőts; Assistant referees: Róbert Kispál, István Tóth

12 November 2008 5	Vasas	4–1	Nyíregyháza	Budapest
16:00 CET (UTC+1)	Katona (yellow card) 12'; Laczkó 20'; Gyánó 36', 58'; Piller 47'	Report	Nánási (yellow card) 24'; N. Tóth II (yellow card) 58'; Fekete 75'; Szilágyi (yellow card) 81'	Stadium: Illovszky Rudolf Stadion; Attendance: 100; Referee: Zsolt Szabó; Assistant referees: Tibor Vámos, Balázs Farkas

22 November 2008 6	Bőcs	1–5	Vasas	Bőcs
13:00 CET (UTC+1)	Jeney (yellow card) 27'; Bognár (yellow card) 48'; Siróczki (yellow card) 49'; Cséke (yellow card) 53'; Irhás 84'	Report	Dobrić 4'; B. Tóth 20'; Mundi 47', 56'; Laczkó (yellow card) 53'; Piller 69'; Katona (yellow card) 89'	Stadium: Szabadság utcai Stadion; Attendance: 200; Referee: Roland Veizer; Assistant referees: Péter Berettyán, Róbert Horváth

29 November 2008 7	Vasas	7–1	Vác-Újbuda	Budapest
11:00 CET (UTC+1)	Sowunmi 8'; B. Tóth 14', 54', 74'; Laczkó 39'; Borszéki (yellow card) 53'; A. Tóth 58'; Papucsek 62'	Report	P. Kovács (yellow card) 13'; Rob (yellow card) 14'; C. Varga 31'; Tányéros (yellow card) 37'	Stadium: Illovszky Rudolf Stadion; Attendance: 50; Referee: Balázs Böcskei; Assistant referees: Roland Schuszter, Andrea Hima

3 December 2008 8	Debrecen	3–3	Vasas	Debrecen
13:00 CET (UTC+1)	Dudu 24', 60'; Bogdanović 25'	Report	Papucsek 2', (yellow card) 56'; Laczkó 17'; A. Tóth 65'	Stadium: Oláh Gábor utcai Stadion; Attendance: 82; Referee: Sándor Andó-Szabó; Assistant referees: Zsolt Szpisják, Balázs Farkas

7 February 2009 9	Vasas	3–0	Diósgyőr	Budapest
12:00 CET (UTC+1)	Divić 57' (pen.); Sowunmi 74'; Papucsek (yellow card) 88'; Dobrić 90'	Report	Stanić (yellow card) 63'; Bokros (yellow card) 66'; Bogunović (yellow card) 67'; Búrány (yellow card) 81'	Stadium: Illovszky Rudolf Stadion; Attendance: 400; Referee: Péter Solymosi; Assistant referees: Oszkár Lémon, Gábor Gyürüsi

11 February 2009 10	Nyíregyháza	4–0	Vasas	Nyíregyháza
13:00 CET (UTC+1)	Kertai 17'; Apostu 26', 27', 39'	Report	Borszéki (yellow card) 26'	Stadium: Városi Stadion; Attendance: 400; Referee: Tibor Gyarmati II; Assistant referees: Zoltán Szalai, Gábor Varga Jr.

==== Knockout phase ====
===== Quarter-finals =====
5 March 2009 First leg	Honvéd	5–1	Vasas	Budapest
18:00 CET (UTC+1)	Stojaković 35'; Arsenijević 62'; Guié 71', 79'; Dobos 77'	Report	Sowunmi 27'	Stadium: Bozsik József Stadion; Attendance: 300; Referee: Szabolcs Szilasi; Assistant referees: Balázs Farkas, Zsolt Butkai

25 March 2009 Second leg	Vasas	0–0 (1–5 agg.)	Honvéd	Budapest
17:00 CET (UTC+1)	Vujović (yellow card) 64'; M. Kiss (yellow card) 86'	Report	Arsenijević (yellow card) 62'; Maróti (yellow card) 65'	Stadium: Illovszky Rudolf Stadion; Attendance: 300; Referee: Gyöngyi Gaál; Assistant referees: Zsolt Márton, Ferenc Varga
Note: Honvéd won 5–1 on aggregate.
