= 2012–13 Vasas FC season =

Vasas
2012–13 season
- Manager: Joaquim Machado Gonçalves (until 1 October); András Tóth (caretaker from 1 October to 10 October); Gábor Szapor (from 10 October to 14 January); Dirk Berger (from 14 January)
- Stadium: Illovszky Rudolf Stadion
- Nemzeti Bajnokság II (East): 2nd
- Magyar Kupa: Semi-finals
- Ligakupa: Group stage
- Highest home attendance: 1,500 (multiple league matches)
- Lowest home attendance: 200 (vs Siófok, 5 December 2012)
- Average home league attendance: 966

The 2012–13 season was Vasas Football Club's 85th competitive season, 1st consecutive season in the Nemzeti Bajnokság II and 101st year in existence as a football club. In addition to the domestic league, Vasas participated in this season's editions of the Magyar Kupa and Ligakupa.

== Squad ==
Note: Flags indicate national team as defined under FIFA eligibility rules; some limited exceptions apply. Players may hold more than one non-FIFA nationality.

No.	Pos.	Nation	Player
1	GK	HUN	Zoltán Szatmári
2	DF	BRA	Romeu Pericles Romao
3	MF	SRB	Dušan Mileusnić
4	MF	HUN	Bertold Popovics
4	DF	HUN	Máté Tóth
5	MF	HUN	Benjámin Cseke
5	MF	HUN	Salem Reidan
6	DF	HUN	Balázs Venczel
7	FW	HUN	Bence Balogh
7	FW	USA	Jacob Wilson
8	MF	HUN	Péter Simek
9	FW	HUN	Péter Szilágyi
10	FW	BRA	Bobô
11	MF	HUN	Ádám Ferkó
12	GK	HUN	Péter Halasi
13	DF	HUN	Vitéz Kárpáti
14	DF	HUN	Ádám Füredi
15	DF	HUN	Máté Katona
16	MF	HUN	Zsolt Merczel

No.	Pos.	Nation	Player
17	DF	HUN	Dávid Görgényi
18	FW	HUN	Martin Ádám
19	MF	BRA	André Luís
19	FW	SRB	Igor Pisanjuk
20	DF	BIH	Haris Mehmedagić
21	DF	BRA	Lucas Rocha
22	DF	HUN	Gábor Polényi
22	DF	HUN	Dániel Túri
23	MF	HUN	Dániel Kovács
24	FW	HUN	Patrik Csoór
25	MF	USA	Shane Recklet
26	GK	HUN	András Horváth
28	DF	HUN	Balázs Nikolov
29	FW	BRA	Deyvison Fernandes
30	MF	GER	Bastian Hohmann
31	MF	HUN	Zsombor Berecz
31	MF	HUN	Roland Mundi
33	MF	BRA	Thiago Freitas

== Competitions ==
=== Overview ===
Competition	First match	Last match	Starting round	Final position	Record							
Competition	First match	Last match	Starting round	Final position	Pld	W	D	L	GF	GA	GD	Win %
Nemzeti Bajnokság II	18 August 2012	1 June 2013	Matchday 1	2nd	30	17	4	9	49	34	+15	56.67
Magyar Kupa	25 September 2012	7 May 2013	Round of 64	Semi-finals	7	4	0	3	11	11	+0	57.14
Ligakupa	5 September 2012	5 December 2012	Group stage	Group stage	6	2	1	3	5	9	−4	33.33
Total					43	23	5	15	65	54	+11	53.49

Source: Competitions

=== Nemzeti Bajnokság II ===
==== League table ====
Pos	Team	Pld	W	D	L	GF	GA	GD	Pts	Promotion or relegation
1	Mezőkövesd (C, P)	30	18	4	8	60	36	+24	58	Promotion to Nemzeti Bajnokság I
2	Vasas	30	17	4	9	49	34	+15	55	
3	Békéscsaba	30	15	10	5	58	38	+20	55	
4	Balmazújváros	30	14	8	8	50	37	+13	50	
5	Nyíregyháza	30	15	4	11	44	33	+11	49	

Source: soccerway.com
Rules for classification: 1st points; 2nd overall wins; 3rd goal difference; 4th goals scored
(C) Champions; (P) Promoted

==== Results summary ====
Overall								Home						Away					
Pld	W	D	L	GF	GA	GD	Pts	W	D	L	GF	GA	GD	W	D	L	GF	GA	GD
30	17	4	9	49	34	+15	55	11	2	2	33	13	+20	6	2	7	16	21	−5

Source: HFF

==== Results by round ====
Round	1	2	3	4	5	6	7	8	9	10	11	12	13	14	15	16	17	18	19	20	21	22	23	24	25	26	27	28	29	30
Ground	H	A	H	A	H	A	H	H	A	H	A	H	A	H	A	A	H	A	H	A	H	A	A	H	A	H	A	H	A	H
Result	D	D	W	L	W	L	D	W	L	W	W	W	L	W	W	W	W	W	L	L	W	W	D	W	L	L	L	W	W	W
Position	8	11	6	9	5	9	10	6	8	6	5	2	3	2	2	2	2	1	1	2	1	1	1	1	2	2	2	2	2	2

Source: Matches
A = Away; H = Home; W = Win; D = Draw; L = Loss

==== Matches ====
18 August 2012 1	Vasas	1–1	Putnok	Budapest
17:30 CEST (UTC+2)	Csoór 79'	Report	P. Monyók 20' (pen.)	Stadium: Illovszky Rudolf Stadion; Attendance: 1,000; Referee: Ádám Farkas

25 August 2012 2	Cegléd	1–1	Vasas	Cegléd
17:30 CEST (UTC+2)	Balog 90+4'	Report	Polényi 23'	Stadium: Malomtó széli stadion Attendance: 600; Referee: László Varga

2 September 2012 3	Vasas	1–0	Ferencváros II	Budapest
16:30 CEST (UTC+2)	Bobô 78'	Report		Stadium: Illovszky Rudolf Stadion; Attendance: 1,500; Referee: Ádám Németh

9 September 2012 4	Mezőkövesd	1–0	Vasas	Mezőkövesd
16:30 CEST (UTC+2)	Á. Hamar 47'	Report		Stadium: Régi Mezőkövesdi Városi Stadion; Attendance: 1,500; Referee: Zoltán Iványi

15 September 2012 5	Vasas	1–0	Szolnok	Budapest
16:00 CEST (UTC+2)	Bobô 13'	Report		Stadium: Illovszky Rudolf Stadion; Attendance: 1,500; Referee: József Berger

22 September 2012 6	Nyíregyháza	2–0	Vasas	Nyíregyháza
20:00 CEST (UTC+2)	Á. Kovács 58'; Montvai 62'	Report		Stadium: Városi Stadion; Attendance: 1,500; Referee: Sándor Andó-Szabó

28 September 2012 7	Vasas	1–1	Békéscsaba	Budapest
15:00 CEST (UTC+2)	Szilágyi 64'	Report	Majoros 9'	Stadium: Illovszky Rudolf Stadion; Attendance: 800; Referee: Szabolcs Szilasi

7 October 2012 8	Vasas	2–0	Újpest II	Budapest
16:00 CEST (UTC+2)	Freitas 44'; D. Fernandes 73'	Report		Stadium: Illovszky Rudolf Stadion; Attendance: 800; Referee: László Lovas

13 October 2012 9	Kazincbarcika	1–0	Vasas	Kazincbarcika
15:00 CEST (UTC+2)	G. Tátrai 62'	Report		Stadium: Pete András Stadion; Attendance: 1,000; Referee: Roland Veizer

20 October 2012 10	Vasas	2–1	Szeged	Budapest
15:30 CEST (UTC+2)	Bobô 44'; Nikolov 89' (pen.)	Report	Jovánczai 24'	Stadium: Illovszky Rudolf Stadion; Attendance: 1,000; Referee: Mihály Fábián

28 October 2012 11	Balmazújváros	1–2	Vasas	Balmazújváros
13:30 CEST (UTC+2)	Urbin 24'	Report	Nikolov 49' (pen.); Freitas 62'	Stadium: Városi Sportpálya; Attendance: 500; Referee: Ádám Radványi

4 November 2012 12	Vasas	6–3	Orosháza	Budapest
15:30 CEST (UTC+2)	Nikolov 17' (pen.), 38' (pen.); Szilágyi 46', 56', 64'; Mundi 89'	Report	R. Varga 44'; A. Végh 55'; N. Szabó 90'	Stadium: Illovszky Rudolf Stadion; Attendance: 1,300; Referee: Balázs Böcskei

10 November 2012 13	Debrecen II	3–0	Vasas	Debrecen
13:30 CEST (UTC+2)	D. Böszörményi 12'; Szécsi 35', 42'	Report		Stadium: Dóczy József utcai Sportpálya; Attendance: 0 Referee: László Lovas

17 November 2012 14	Vasas	2–0	Honvéd II	Budapest
16:00 CEST (UTC+2)	D. Fernandes 14'; D. Kovács 19'	Report		Stadium: Illovszky Rudolf Stadion; Attendance: 1,300; Referee: Ferenc Karakó

24 November 2012 15	Vác	0–1	Vasas	Vác
13:00 CEST (UTC+2)	Nikolov 80' (pen.)	Report		Stadium: Ligeti Stadion; Attendance: 500; Referee: Viktor Kassai

3 March 2013 16	Putnok	2–3	Vasas	Putnok
14:30 CEST (UTC+2)	Pavlov 79', 82'	Report	Wilson 38'; Szilágyi 54', 83'	Stadium: Állomás úti Sportpálya; Attendance: 600; Referee: József Berger

10 March 2013 17	Vasas	3–1	Cegléd	Budapest
15:00 CEST (UTC+2)	Katona 45', 71'; Ádám 68'	Report	Kormos 14'	Stadium: Illovszky Rudolf Stadion; Attendance: 1,000; Referee: Tamás Bognár

23 March 2013 19	Vasas	2–3	Mezőkövesd	Budapest
16:00 CEST (UTC+2)	Rocha 12'; Szilágyi 76'	Report	Petneházi 2', 19'; Menougong 65'	Stadium: Illovszky Rudolf Stadion; Attendance: 1,000; Referee: Szabolcs Szilasi

30 March 2013 20	Szolnok	2–1	Vasas	Szolnok
15:00 CEST (UTC+2)	Szepessy 33'; I. Nagy 65' (pen.)	Report	Freitas 25' (pen.)	Stadium: Véső úti Sporttelep; Attendance: 1,000; Referee: Gábor Oláh

6 April 2013 21	Vasas	1–0	Nyíregyháza	Budapest
17:00 CEST (UTC+2)	Freitas 66'	Report		Stadium: Illovszky Rudolf Stadion; Attendance: 600; Referee: Dániel Becséri

10 April 2013 18	Ferencváros II	0–1	Vasas	Budapest
16:30 CEST (UTC+2)		Report	Batik 35' (o.g.)	Stadium: Béke téri Stadion; Attendance: 400; Referee: Csaba Pintér
Note: The HFF Competition Committee has postponed the entire 18th round due to adverse weather conditions.

13 April 2013 22	Békéscsaba	0–2	Vasas	Békéscsaba
16:30 CEST (UTC+2)		Report	Cseke 50'; Wilson 88'	Stadium: Kórház utcai Stadion; Attendance: 1,000; Referee: Péter Solymosi

21 April 2013 23	Újpest II	1–1	Vasas	Budapest
17:00 CEST (UTC+2)	Dombai 79'	Report	Cseke 49'	Stadium: Szusza Ferenc Stadion; Attendance: 600; Referee: Balázs Berke

27 April 2013 24	Vasas	5–0	Kazincbarcika	Budapest
18:00 CEST (UTC+2)	Wilson 18'; Rocha 36'; Szilágyi 50', 55', 67'	Report		Stadium: Illovszky Rudolf Stadion; Attendance: 1,000; Referee: Csaba Pintér

1 May 2013 30	Vasas	3–0; Awarded	Vác	Budapest
		Report		Stadium: Illovszky Rudolf Stadion
Note: The final round was set for 1 May.

4 May 2013 25	Szeged	3–1	Vasas	Szeged
17:30 CEST (UTC+2)	Jovánczai 30', 57'; Petrók 49'	Report	Cseke 41'	Stadium: Szegedi VSE Stadion; Attendance: 1,500; Referee: Ádám Farkas

11 May 2013 26	Vasas	1–2	Balmazújváros	Budapest
18:00 CEST (UTC+2)	Wilson 13'	Report	Bokros 12'; L. Kiss 19'	Stadium: Illovszky Rudolf Stadion; Attendance: 1,000; Referee: Dániel Becséri

18 May 2013 27	Orosháza	4–1	Vasas	Orosháza
18:00 CEST (UTC+2)	D. Tóth 14', 40', 76'; P. Bernáth 88'	Report	Cseke 90'	Stadium: Mátrai- Stadion; Attendance: 400; Referee: József Berger

25 May 2013 28	Vasas	2–1	Debrecen II	Budapest
18:00 CEST (UTC+2)	Ádám 51'; Görgényi 83'	Report	Sós 73'	Stadium: Illovszky Rudolf Stadion; Attendance: 700; Referee: Béla Botló

1 June 2013 29	Honvéd II	0–2	Vasas	Budapest
18:00 CEST (UTC+2)		Report	Wilson 50'; Freitas 85'	Stadium: Bozsik József Stadion; Attendance: 300; Referee: Gábor Péter Kovács

=== Magyar Kupa ===
25 September 2012 Round of 64	Pénzügyőr	1–2	Vasas	Budapest
15:30 CEST (UTC+2)	B. Varga-Sebestyén 52'	Report	D. Fernandes 49'; Bobô 66'	Stadium: NAV Pasaréti úti Sporttelep; Attendance: 800; Referee: Tibor II Gyarmati

31 October 2012 Round of 32	Vasas	3–0	Ajka	Budapest
16:00 CEST (UTC+2)	Bobô 11'; Polényi 72'; Szilágyi 81'	Report		Stadium: Illovszky Rudolf Stadion; Attendance: 1,000; Referee: Balázs Berke

==== Round of 16 ====
21 November 2012 First leg	Békéscsaba	0–1	Vasas	Békéscsaba
17:00 CEST (UTC+2)		Report	Simek 55'	Stadium: Kórház utcai Stadion; Attendance: 300; Referee: István Mészáros

28 November 2012 Second leg	Vasas	0–1 (a.e.t.) (1–1 agg.) (4–3 p)	Békéscsaba	Budapest
18:00 CEST (UTC+2)		Report	D. S. Obot 90'	Stadium: Illovszky Rudolf Stadion; Attendance: 500; Referee: Mihály Fábián
Note: Vasas won on penalty kicks 4–3.

==== Quarter-finals ====
23 February 2013 First leg	Vasas	3–1	Siófok	Budapest
14:00 CEST (UTC+2)	Nikolov 37', 56'; Popovics 64'	Report	Pál 83'	Stadium: Mészöly Kálmán edzőpálya Attendance: 0 Referee: Péter Solymosi

27 February 2013 Second leg	Siófok	2–1 (3–4 agg.)	Vasas	Siófok
13:00 CEST (UTC+2)	Fehér 57'; Dajić 66'	Report	Bobô 62'	Stadium: Révész Géza utcai Stadion; Attendance: 0 Referee: Mihály Fábián
Note: Vasas won 4–3 on aggregate.

==== Semi-finals ====
16 April 2013 First leg	Vasas	0–3	Debrecen	Budapest
18:00 CEST (UTC+2)		Report	Ferenczi 8' (pen.), 19' (pen.); Czvitkovics 68'	Stadium: Illovszky Rudolf Stadion; Attendance: 1,200; Referee: Ádám Németh

7 May 2013 Second leg	Debrecen	3–1 (6–1 agg.)	Vasas	Debrecen
18:00 CEST (UTC+2)	Coulibaly 54', 77'; Sidibe 89'	Report	Berecz 27'	Stadium: Oláh Gábor utcai Stadion; Attendance: 800; Referee: Csaba Pintér
Note: Debrecen won 6–1 on aggregate.

=== Ligakupa ===
==== Group stage ====
Pos	Team	Pld	W	D	L	GF	GA	GD	Pts	Qualification	PÉC	PAK	VAS	SIÓ
1	Pécs	6	3	2	1	11	6	+5	11	Advance to knockout phase	—	2–0	2–1	1–1
2	Paks	6	2	2	2	7	6	+1	8		2–1	—	4–1	1–1
3	Vasas	6	2	1	3	5	9	−4	7		1–1	1–0	—	0–2
4	Siófok	6	1	3	2	5	7	−2	6		1–4	0–0	0–1	—

Rules for classification: 1) points; 2) goal difference; 3) number of goals scored.

5 September 2012 1	Siófok	0–1	Vasas	Siófok
17:30 CEST (UTC+2)		Report	A. Luís 9'	Stadium: Révész Géza utcai Stadion; Attendance: 100; Referee: Gábor Oláh

12 September 2012 2	Vasas	1–0	Paks	Budapest
17:30 CEST (UTC+2)	Á. Füredi 55' (pen.)	Report		Stadium: Illovszky Rudolf Stadion; Attendance: 300; Referee: Róbert Nagy

10 October 2012 3	Vasas	1–1	Pécs	Budapest
16:00 CEST (UTC+2)	Mundi 61'	Report	Ceolin 88'	Stadium: Illovszky Rudolf Stadion; Attendance: 300; Referee: Norbert Kiss

17 October 2012 4	Pécs	2–1	Vasas	Pécs
18:00 CEST (UTC+2)	Stoimirović 1'; Szatmári 15'	Report	G. Gajág 81' (o.g.)	Stadium: Stadion PMFC; Attendance: 300; Referee: József Erdős

13 November 2012 5	Paks	4–1	Vasas	Paks
13:30 CEST (UTC+2)	Simon 32', 59'; Eppel 53'; Heffler 75'	Report	Á. Füredi 16'	Stadium: Fehérvári úti Stadion; Referee: József Berger

5 December 2012 6	Vasas	0–2	Siófok	Budapest
15:00 CEST (UTC+2)		Report	Egerszegi 53'; B. Horváth 70'	Stadium: Illovszky Rudolf Stadion; Attendance: 200; Referee: Ádám farkas
