= Bobo =

Bobo may refer to:

== Arts, entertainment and media ==
=== Comic strips ===
- Bobo (Belgian comics)
- Bobo (Italian comics)
- Bobo (Swedish comics)

=== Fictional characters ===
- Bobo the Bear, in The Muppets series
- Professor Bobo, from Mystery Science Theater 3000
- Bobo Gigliotti, the psychotic boss of "Fat Pizza" from the Australian comedy TV series Pizza and Fat Pizza
- Bobo, pet cat of Doris Husselmeyer in the comic strip Piranha Club
- Bobo Peterson, a character in the 1992 TV comedy Revenge of the Nerds III

=== Music ===
- BoBo (band), a Chinese boy band formed in 2007
- "Bobo" (J Balvin song), 2016
- "Bobo" (Olamide song), 2015
- "Bobo" (Aya Nakamura song), 2021
- "Bobo", a 2021 song by Bad Gyal, Mariah Angeliq and María Becerra
- "Les Bobos", a 2006 song by Renaud

=== Other arts, entertainment and media ===
- The Bobo, a 1967 film starring Peter Sellers
- Bobo (film), stylized as BOBO, a 2025 Kenyan film
- Bobo (magazine), a Dutch and Indonesian children's magazine which follows the adventures of Bobo, a blue rabbit

== People ==
- Bobo people, an ethnic group of Burkina Faso
- Bobole, a Coahuiltecan tribe sometimes spelled Bobo
- Bobo (socio-economic group), French portmanteau for "bourgeois-bohemian", describing France's elite
- Bobo (nickname)
- Bobo (given name), a list of people
- Bobo (surname), a list of people
- Bobô (footballer, born 1962), Brazilian retired footballer and head coach Raimundo Nonato Tavares da Silva
- Bobô (footballer, born 1982), Brazilian footballer José Claudeon dos Santos
- Bobô (footballer, born 1985), Brazilian footballer Deyvison Rogério da Silva
- Bobo (singer), German singer-songwriter Christiane Hebold
- DJ BoBo (born 1968), Swiss musician Peter René Cipiriano Baumann
- Bobo Barnett (1903-1985), American circus clown known as "Bobo the Clown"
- Bobo Brazil, main ring name of American professional wrestler Houston Harris (1924–1998)
- Scarlett BoBo, Canadian drag queen

== Places ==
- Bobo, Georgia, an unincorporated community in the United States
- Bobo, Mississippi (disambiguation), multiple communities in the United States
- Bobo Ridge, Ross Dependency, Antarctica
- Bobo River, New South Wales, Australia
- Bobo-Dioulasso, a city in Burkina Faso, sometimes shortened to Bobo

== Sports teams ==
- ASF Bobo, a football club based in Bobo Dioulasso, Burkina Faso
- RC Bobo, a football club based in Bobo Dioulasso, Burkina Faso

== Other uses ==
- Bobo (gorilla) a popular gorilla at the Woodland Park Zoo in Seattle from 1953 to 1968
- Bobo, Vietnamese name for Job's tears, a plant of south-east Asia
- Bo-Bo, a type of locomotive
- Babay (Slavic folklore) or Bobo, a bogeyman-like monster in Poland
- Bobo brand, a product that is sold inexpensively under a relatively unfamiliar brand name

== See also ==
- Bobó de camarão or shrimp bobo, a Brazilian dish made of shrimp cooked on a manioc pureé
- Bobo doll experiment, a 1960s test of human aggression
- Bobos in Paradise
- Boba (disambiguation)
- Bobô (disambiguation)
- Bobobo, a Japanese manga series
