= Bobô =

Bobô may refer to different Brazilian footballers:

- Deivson Rogério da Silva (born 1985)
- Raimundo Nonato Tavares da Silva (born 1962)
- José Claudeon dos Santos (born 1982)

== See also ==
- Bobo (disambiguation)
