= Bobo (given name) =

Bobo is the given name of:

- Saint Bobo (died 985), French Chalcedonian saint and knight
- Bobo of San Teodoro (died 1199), Italian cardinal
- Bobo Bola (born 1985), Rwandan footballer
- Bobo Chan (born 1979), Hong Kong former singer and model

== See also ==
- Bobo (nickname)
