= Bobo (nickname) =

Bobo is a nickname for:

- Bobo Baldé (born 1975), Guinean footballer
- Bobo Bergström (born 1964), Swedish chef and restaurateur
- Eric "Bobo" Correa (born 1968), percussionist performing with Cypress Hill, Cultura Londres Proyecto, Sol Invicto, and the Beastie Boys
- Bobo Craxi (born 1964), Italian politician
- Bobo Faulkner (1941–2014), British model and television presenter in Australia
- Bobo Holloman (1923–1987), American Major League Baseball pitcher
- Bobo Jenkins (1916–1984), American blues guitarist, singer and songwriter
- Bobo Leonard, Negro league baseball player
- Bobo Lewis (1926–1998), American actress
- Bobo Newsom (1907–1962), American Major League Baseball pitcher
- Bobo Olson (1928–2002), American boxer and world middleweight champion
- Bobo Osborne (1935–2011), American Major League Baseball player
- Bobó Rompão (8 June 1990), Santomean footballer
- Charles "Bobo" Shaw (1947–2017), American free jazz drummer
- Bobô (footballer, born 1985), Brazilian footballer Deivson Rogério da Silva
- José Claudeon dos Santos (born 1982), known as Bobô, Brazilian footballer
- Raimundo Nonato Tavares da Silva (born 1962), known as Bobô, Brazilian footballer
- Bobo Stenson (born 1944), Swedish jazz pianist
- Christian Vieri (born 1973), Italian footballer
- Uncle Bobo, a nickname for impresario and rock concert promoter Bill Graham (1931–1991)
