= Bence Balogh =

Hungarian footballer (born 1991)

Personal information
- Full name: Bence Attila Balogh
- Date of birth: 4 October 1991 (age 35)
- Place of birth: Budapest, Hungary
- Height: 1.80 m (5 ft 11 in)
- Position: Forward

Team information
- Current team: Rákospalota
- Number: 7

Youth career
- 2003–2009: Vasas

Senior career*
Years	Team	Apps	(Gls)
2008–2013	Vasas	5	(0)
2009–2012	Vasas II	41	(7)
2013	→ Budaörs (loan)	9	(5)
2013–2014	Budaörs	4	(0)
2014	Soroksár	12	(3)
2014–2015	Balatonfüred	14	(9)
2015	Putnok	0	(0)
2015	Kaposvár	6	(0)
2015–2016	Dorog	9	(1)
2016	Rákosmente	12	(2)
2016–2021	BKV Előre	124	(60)
2021–2023	MTK II	32	(9)
2023–2024	Csepel	19	(14)
2024–	Rákospalota	13	(4)
- * Club domestic league appearances and goals as of 16 November 2024

Bence Attila Balogh (born 4 October 1991) is a Hungarian professional footballer, who plays as a forward for Megyei Bajnokság I club Rákospalota. He also appeared in the 2019 film K-12 by Melanie Martinez as Jason.

== Career ==
On 27 February 2015, it was announced that Balogh would sign for Nemzeti Bajnokság II side Kaposvár in the winter transfer window.

A fan's favorite at BKV Előre, his departure was hinted at in the 2019–20 season but never eventuated.

== Career statistics ==
As of match played 16 November 2024

Appearances and goals by club, season and competition
Club	Season	League			Magyar Kupa		Ligakupa		Other		Total	
Club	Season	Division	Apps	Goals	Apps	Goals	Apps	Goals	Apps	Goals	Apps	Goals
Vasas	2008–09	Nemzeti Bajnokság I	—		—		2	0	—		2	0
Vasas	2009–10	Nemzeti Bajnokság I	2	0	—		4	0	—		6	0
Vasas	2010–11	Nemzeti Bajnokság I	—		—		1	0	—		1	0
Vasas	2012–13	Nemzeti Bajnokság II	3	0	1	0	5	0	—		9	0
Vasas	Total		5	0	1	0	12	0	—		18	0
Vasas II	2008–09	Nemzeti Bajnokság III	3	0	—		—		—		3	0
Vasas II	2009–10	Nemzeti Bajnokság III	8	2	—		—		—		8	2
Vasas II	2010–11	Nemzeti Bajnokság III	22	4	—		—		1 (Note: Appearance in Magyar Kupa qualifying rounds)	0	23	4
Vasas II	2011–12	Nemzeti Bajnokság III	8	1	—		—		—		8	1
Vasas II	Total		41	7	—		—		1	0	42	7
Budaörs (loan)	2012–13	Nemzeti Bajnokság III	9	5	—		—		1 (Note: Appearance in Nemzeti Bajnokság III promotion play-offs)	0	10	5
Budaörs	2013–14	Nemzeti Bajnokság III	4	0	—		—		—		4	0
Budaörs	Budaörs total		13	5	—		—		1	0	14	5
Soroksár	2013–14	Nemzeti Bajnokság III	12	3	—		—		—		12	3
Balatonfüred	2014–15	Nemzeti Bajnokság III	14	9	1	0	—		—		15	9
Kaposvár	2014–15	Nemzeti Bajnokság II	6	0	—		—		—		6	0
Dorog	2015–16	Nemzeti Bajnokság III	9	1	1	0	—		—		10	1
Rákosmente	2015–16	Nemzeti Bajnokság III	12	2	—		—		—		12	2
BKV Előre	2016–17	Nemzeti Bajnokság III	25	10	—		—		—		25	10
BKV Előre	2017–18	Nemzeti Bajnokság III	24	11	—		—		—		24	11
BKV Előre	2018–19	Nemzeti Bajnokság III	27	21	1	0	—		—		28	21
BKV Előre	2019–20	Nemzeti Bajnokság III	18	10	1	1	—		—		19	11
BKV Előre	2020–21	Nemzeti Bajnokság III	30	8	—		—		—		30	8
BKV Előre	Total		124	60	2	1	—		—		126	61
MTK II	2021–22	Nemzeti Bajnokság III	14	2	—		—		—		14	2
MTK II	2022–23	Nemzeti Bajnokság III	18	7	—		—		—		18	7
MTK II	Total		32	9	—		—		—		32	9
Csepel	2023–24	Megyei Bajnokság I	19	14	1	2	—		3 (Note: Two appearances and one goal in Budapest Kupa, one appearance in Megyei Bajnokság I promotion play-offs)	1	23	17
Rákospalota	2024–25	Megyei Bajnokság I	13	4	1	0	—		1 (Note: Appearance in Budapest Kupa)	0	15	4
Career total			300	114	7	3	12	0	6	1	325	118
