= Bobo (surname) =

Bobo is the surname of:

- Drew Bobo (born 2004), American football player
- Elizabeth Bobo (born 1943), American politician
- Holly Bobo (1990–2011), American murder victim
- Hubert Bobo (1934–1999), American football player
- Jake Bobo (born 1998), American football player
- J. B. Bobo (1910–1996), American magician
- Jonah Bobo (born 1997), American child actor
- John P. Bobo (1943–1967), American military officer
- Matt Bobo (born 1977), American soccer player
- Mike Bobo (born 1974), American football coach
- Orlando Bobo (1974–2007), American football player
- Roger Bobo (1938–2023), American tuba player
- Rosalvo Bobo, Haitian politician leader of opposition to U.S.-backed president Vilbrun Guillaume Sam during the 1915 United States occupation of Haiti
- Salha "Mama" Bobo, Syrian-American Jewish businesswoman
- Sireli Bobo (born 1976), Fijian rugby player
- Willie Bobo (1934–1983), American jazz percussionist
