= Barna Papucsek =

Hungarian footballer

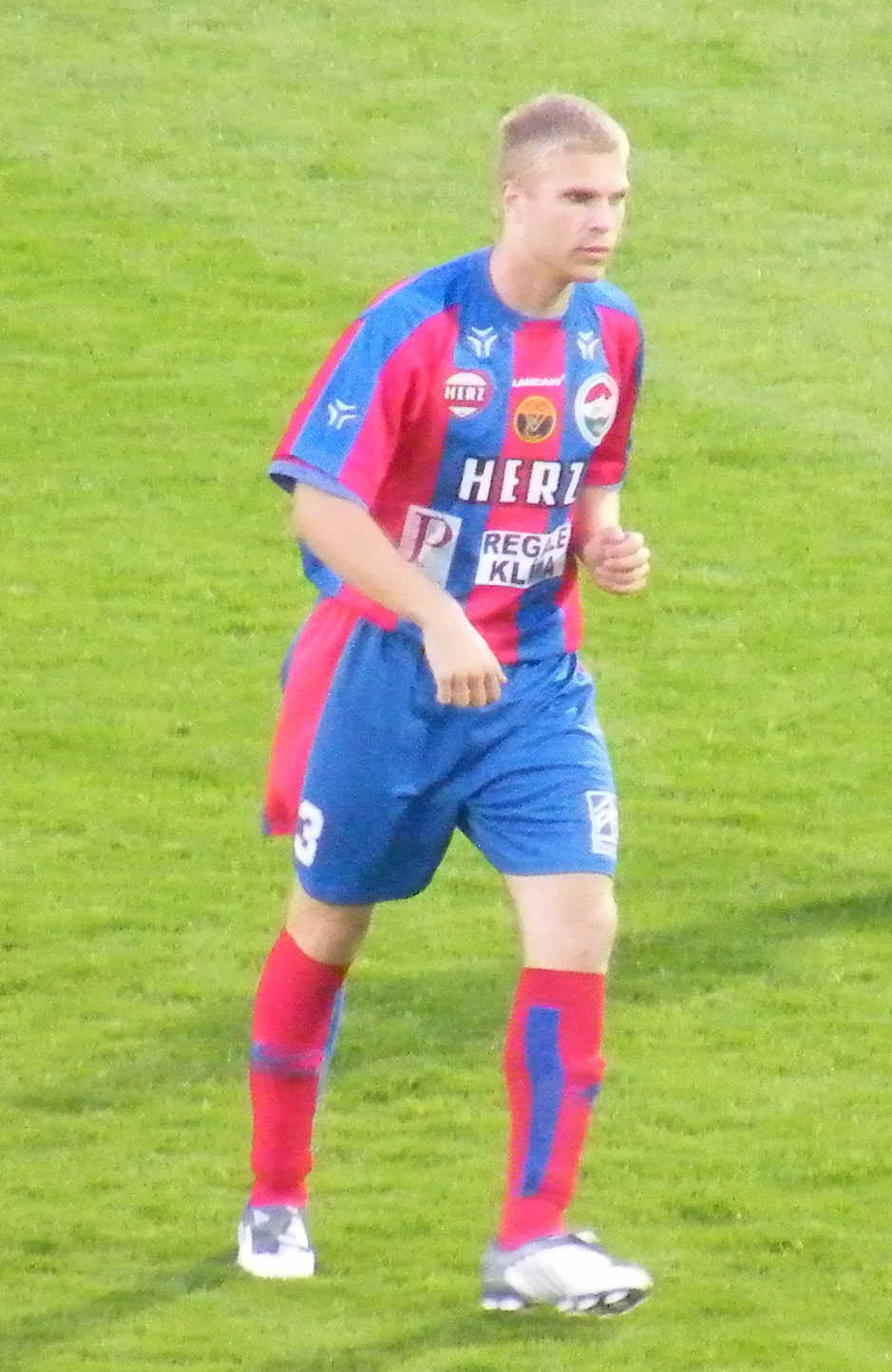

Personal information
- Date of birth: 11 October 1989 (age 37)
- Place of birth: Budapest, Hungary
- Height: 1.89 m (6 ft 2 in)
- Position: Defender

Team information
- Current team: Csákvár
- Number: 15

Youth career
- 2003–2008: Pilisvörösvár

Senior career*
Years	Team	Apps	(Gls)
2008	Tatabánya	1	(0)
2008–2009	Vasas	4	(0)
2009–2010	Hévíz	7	(0)
2010–2012	Videoton	0	(0)
2010–2012	Videoton II	46	(4)
2012–2014	Puskás	24	(1)
2014–2016	Szolnok	45	(5)
2016–2018	Kisvárda	48	(3)
2018–2020	Balmazújváros	38	(4)
2020–2023	Nyíregyháza	65	(1)
2023–	Csákvár	12	(0)
- * Club domestic league appearances and goals as of 21 December 2023

Barna Papucsek (born 11 October 1989) is a Hungarian professional footballer who plays for Csákvár.

== Career statistics ==
Appearances and goals by club, season and competition
Club	Season	League			Cup		League Cup		Europe		Total	
Club	Season	Division	Apps	Goals	Apps	Goals	Apps	Goals	Apps	Goals	Apps	Goals
Tatabánya	2007–08	Nemzeti Bajnokság I	1	0	0	0	0	0	0	0	1	0
Vasas	2008–09	Nemzeti Bajnokság I	4	0	0	0	12	2	0	0	16	2
Hévíz	2009–10	Nemzeti Bajnokság II	7	0	1	0	0	0	0	0	8	0
Videoton
Videoton	2009–10	Nemzeti Bajnokság I	0	0	0	0	2	0	0	0	2	0
Videoton	2011–12	Nemzeti Bajnokság I	0	0	2	0	0	0	0	0	2	0
Videoton	Total		0	0	2	0	2	0	0	0	4	0
Videoton II
Videoton II	2009–10	Nemzeti Bajnokság II	10	0	0	0	0	0	0	0	10	0
Videoton II	2010–11	Nemzeti Bajnokság II	16	3	0	0	0	0	0	0	16	3
Videoton II	2011–12	Nemzeti Bajnokság II	20	1	0	0	0	0	0	0	20	1
Videoton II	Total		46	4	0	0	0	0	0	0	46	4
Puskás
Puskás	2012–13	Nemzeti Bajnokság II	22	1	0	0	0	0	—		22	1
Puskás	2013–14	Nemzeti Bajnokság I	2	0	1	0	4	0	—		7	0
Puskás	Total		24	1	1	0	4	0	0	0	29	1
Szolnok
Szolnok	2013–14	Nemzeti Bajnokság II	13	2	0	0	2	0	—		15	2
Szolnok	2014–15	Nemzeti Bajnokság II	20	3	6	1	4	1	—		30	5
Szolnok	2015–16	Nemzeti Bajnokság II	12	0	2	0	—		—		14	0
Szolnok	Total		45	5	8	1	6	1	0	0	59	7
Kisvárda
Kisvárda	2015–16	Nemzeti Bajnokság II	12	2	0	0	—		—		12	2
Kisvárda	2016–17	Nemzeti Bajnokság II	18	0	0	0	—		—		18	0
Kisvárda	2017–18	Nemzeti Bajnokság II	18	1	3	0	—		—		21	1
Kisvárda	Total		48	3	3	0	0	0	0	0	51	3
Balmazújváros	2018–19	Nemzeti Bajnokság II	33	4	0	0	—		—		33	4
Career total			208	17	15	1	24	3	0	0	247	21

Updated to games played as of 19 May 2019.
