= Bobó Rompão =

Santomean footballer

Personal information
- Full name: Djanneley Rompão
- Date of birth: 8 June 1990 (age 36)
- Place of birth: São Tomé and Príncipe
- Height: 1.83 m (6 ft 0 in)
- Position: Midfielder

Team information
- Current team: Agrosport

Senior career*
Years	Team	Apps	(Gls)
2019–	Agrosport		

International career^{‡}
2019–	São Tomé and Príncipe	1	(0)
- * Club domestic league appearances and goals as of 00:11, 26 March 2021 (UTC) ‡ National team caps and goals as of 00:11, 26 March 2021 (UTC)

Djanneley "Bobó" Rompão (born 8 June 1990), sometimes known as just Bobó, is a Santomean footballer who plays as a midfielder for Agrosport and the São Tomé and Príncipe national team.

== International career ==
Rompão made his professional debut with the São Tomé and Príncipe national team in a 2–1 2022 FIFA World Cup qualification loss to Guinea-Bissau on 10 September 2019.
