= Helmi Loussaief =

Tunisian footballer (born 1986)

Personal information
- Full name: Helmi Loussaief
- Date of birth: 12 February 1986 (age 40)
- Place of birth: Évry, Essonne, France
- Height: 1.77 m (5 ft 10 in)
- Position: Midfielder

Team information
- Current team: PKNS FC
- Number: 6

Youth career
- 1996–1998: Ville d'Evry Sport Club
- 1998–1999: CS Bretigny Football
- 1999–2002: INF Clairefontaine

Senior career*
Years	Team	Apps	(Gls)
2004–2006	AS Monaco B	13	(0)
2006–2007	Club Africain	16	(3)
2007–2010	US Monastir	36	(12)
2010–2011	Vasas SC	3	(0)
2011–2012	Spezia Calcio 1906	0	(0)
2012	Hammam-Lif	11	(1)
2012–	PKNS FC	32	(6)

International career^{‡}
2005–2008	Tunisia U23	2	(0)
2008–	Tunisia	0	(0)
- * Club domestic league appearances and goals as of 28 February 2013 ‡ National team caps and goals as of 28 February 2013

Helmi Loussaief (born 12 February 1986) is a footballer who currently plays for PKNS FC as a midfielder in the Malaysia Super League. Born in France, he represented Tunisia at international level.

He acquired French nationality on 31 May 1997, through the collective effect of his mother's naturalization.

After graduating from INF Clairefontaine, Helmi joined AS Monaco B in 2004.
