= Jozef Gašpar =

Slovak footballer

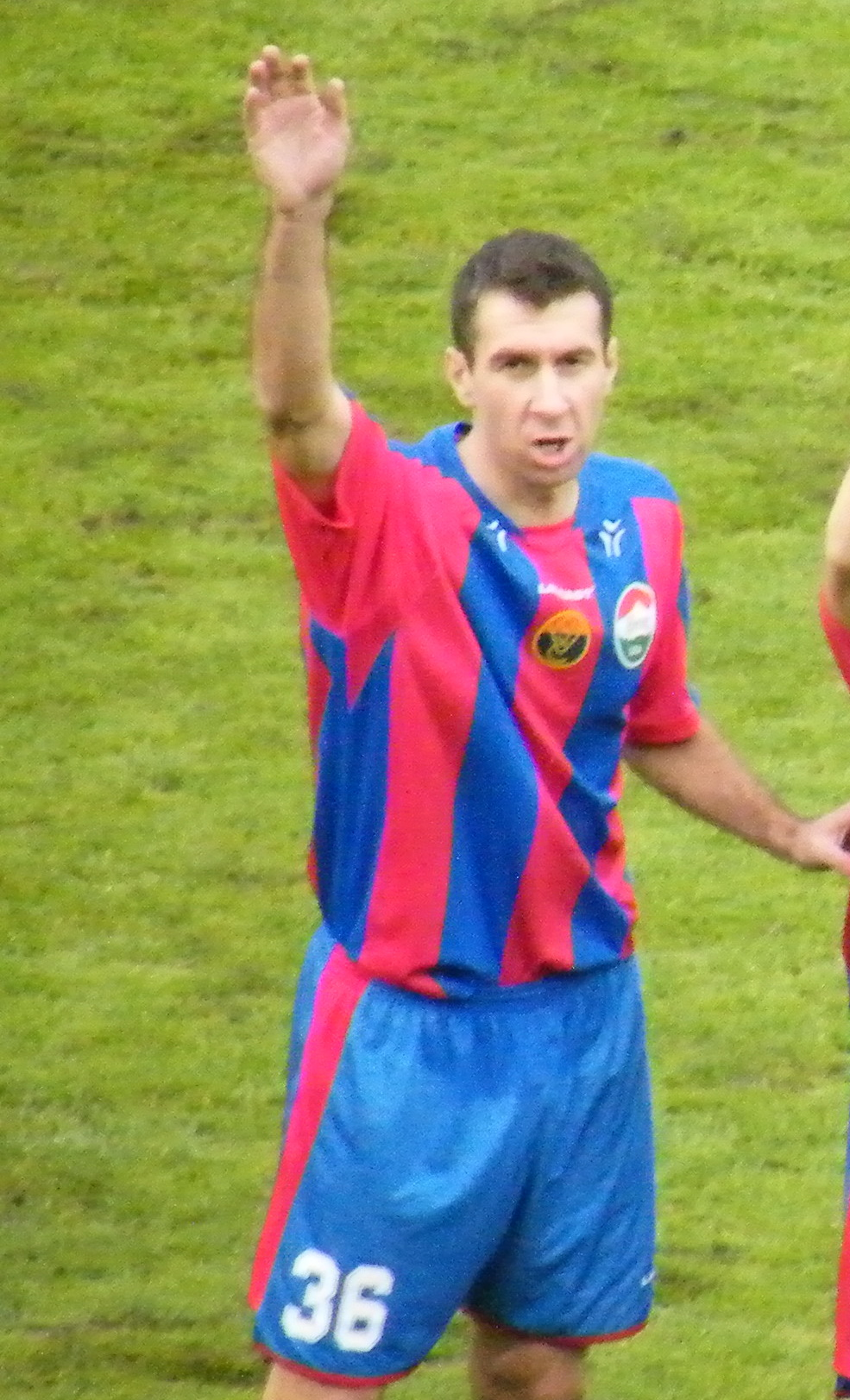
- Gašpar in 2009

Personal information
- Date of birth: 23 August 1977 (age 49)
- Place of birth: Rožňava, Slovakia
- Height: 1.91 m (6 ft 3 in)
- Position: Defender

Senior career*
Years	Team	Apps	(Gls)
2000–2003	Inter Bratislava	74	(1)
2004	Vegalta Sendai	22	(2)
2004	Slovan Bratislava		
2005	Diósgyőr	28	(4)
2005–2006	Slovan Bratislava		
2006–2008	Panionios	24	(0)
2008	Kerkyra		
2008–2009	Ethnikos Asteras	31	(0)
2009–2012	Vasas	54	(4)
- * Club domestic league appearances and goals

Jozef Gašpar (Hungarian: József Gáspár; born 23 August 1977) is a Slovak retired professional footballer. He last played for Vasas.
