= Jacob Wilson (soccer) =

American soccer player (born 1986)

Personal information
- Full name: Jacob Christopher Wilson
- Date of birth: 22 January 1986 (age 40)
- Place of birth: United States
- Position: Forward

College career
Years	Team	Apps	(Gls)
2004–2009	California Golden Bears		

Senior career*
Years	Team	Apps	(Gls)
2006	San Francisco Seals	2	(0)
2007	San Jose Frogs	8	(4)
2011―2012	Germania Schöneiche		
2012	Feirense	4	(0)
2013	Vasas	15	(5)
2014	SpVgg Bayern Hof	9	(2)
- * Club domestic league appearances and goals

Jacob Christopher Wilson (born 22 January 1986) is an American former soccer player who played as a forward.

== Career ==
In 2004, Wilson joined American side California Golden Bears. In 2011, he signed for German fifth tier side Germania Schöneiche. In 2012, Wilson signed for Feirense in the Portuguese second tier, where he made four league appearances. On 2 September 2012, he debuted for Feirense during a 2–1 loss to Portimonense. Before the second half of 2012–13, Wilson signed for Hungarian second-tier club Vasas, where he suffered an injury. Before the second half of 2013–14, he signed for SpVgg Bayern Hof in the German fourth tier.
