= Bastian Hohmann =

German footballer (born 1990)

Personal information
- Full name: Bastian Dominik Hohmann
- Date of birth: 9 August 1990 (age 36)
- Place of birth: Berlin, Germany
- Height: 1.81 m (5 ft 11 in)
- Positions: Midfielder; winger

Senior career*
Years	Team	Apps	(Gls)
–2012	SV Germania Schöneiche		
2012–2013	Feirense	1	(0)
2013	Vasas SC	14	(1)
2014	Erzgebirge Aue	0	(0)
2015	Berliner FC Dynamo	1	(0)
- * Club domestic league appearances and goals

Bastian Hohmann (born 9 August 1990) is a German former professional footballer who played as a midfielder or winger.

== Career ==
Hohmann started his senior career with SV Germania Schöneiche. In 2012, he signed for C.D. Feirense in the Portuguese LigaPro, where he made two appearances and scored zero goals. After that, he played for Vasas SC and Erzgebirge Aue.

He joined Berliner Dynamo in 2015.
