= Bobo, Mississippi =

Bobo, Mississippi may refer to:

- Bobo, Coahoma County, Mississippi, an unincorporated community in Coahoma County, Mississippi
- Bobo, Quitman County, Mississippi, an unincorporated community in Quitman County, Mississippi
