= Gianni Dellacasa =

Italian football manager

Personal information
- Date of birth: 9 July 1961 (age 65)
- Place of birth: Turin, Italy

Managerial career
- Years: Team
- 1998–2003: AC Bellinzona
- 2003–2004: FC Winterthur
- 2004–2005: Neuchâtel Xamax
- 2005: FC Sion
- 2005–2006: U.S. Cremonese
- 2006–2007: FC Lugano
- 2008–2009: FC Chiasso
- 2009–2010: Vasas SC
- 2011: ES Sétif

Gianni Dellacasa (born 9 July 1961) is an Italian football manager.
