= Goran Arnaut =

Serbian footballer

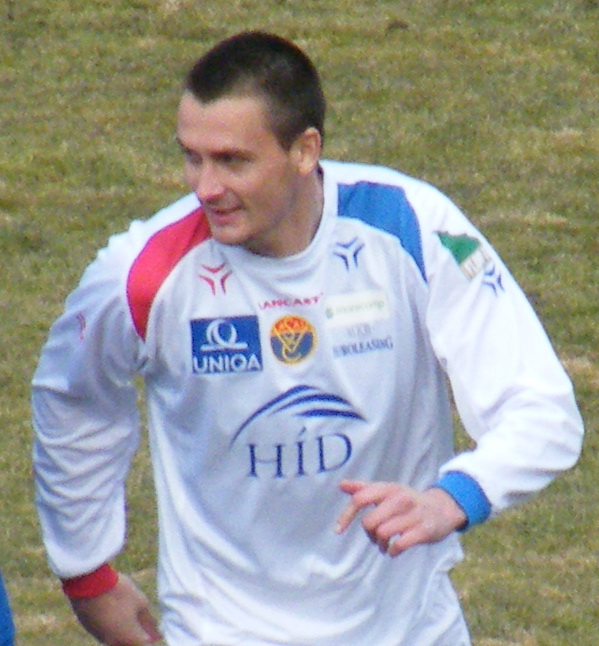

Personal information
- Full name: Goran Arnaut
- Date of birth: 27 August 1979 (age 47)
- Place of birth: Bačka Topola, SFR Yugoslavia
- Height: 1.94 m (6 ft 4 1/2 in)
- Position: Midfielder

Senior career*
Years	Team	Apps	(Gls)
1995–1996	OFK Beograd	1	(0)
1997–2002	Partizan	6	(0)
2001	→ Radnički Kragujevac (loan)	9	(1)
2001	→ Čukarički (loan)	6	(0)
2002	→ Teleoptik (loan)		
2003	Sopot		
2005–2007	Primorje	66	(19)
2007–2010	Inter Baku	32	(0)
2010–2011	Vasas	15	(2)

International career
- FR Yugoslavia U18
- * Club domestic league appearances and goals

Goran Arnaut (Serbian Cyrillic: Горан Арнаут; born 27 August 1979) is a Serbian retired footballer who played mainly as a central midfielder.

== Statistics ==
Club performance			League		Cup		Continental		Total	
Season	Club	League	Apps	Goals	Apps	Goals	Apps	Goals	Apps	Goals
1999–00	Partizan	First League of FR Yugoslavia	1	0			–		1	0
2000–01	Radnički Kragujevac	First League of FR Yugoslavia	9	1			–		9	1
2001–02	Čukarički	First League of FR Yugoslavia	6	0			–		6	0
2004–05	Primorje	1. SNL	9	0			0	0	9	0
2005–06	Primorje	1. SNL	26	6			–		26	6
2006–07	Primorje	1. SNL	31	13			–		31	13
2007-08	Inter Baku	Azerbaijan Premier League	22	0			-		22	0
2008-09	Inter Baku	Azerbaijan Premier League	8	0			1	0	9	0
2009-10	Inter Baku	Azerbaijan Premier League	2	0			–		2	0
2010–11	Vasas	Nemzeti Bajnokság I	15	2			–		15	2
Total	Yugoslavia		16	1			0	0	16	1
Total	Slovenia		66	19			0	0	66	19
Total	Azerbaijan		32	0			1	0	33	0
Total	Hungary		15	2			0	0	15	2
Career total			129	22			1	0	130	22
