= Ljubiša Vukelja =

Serbian footballer

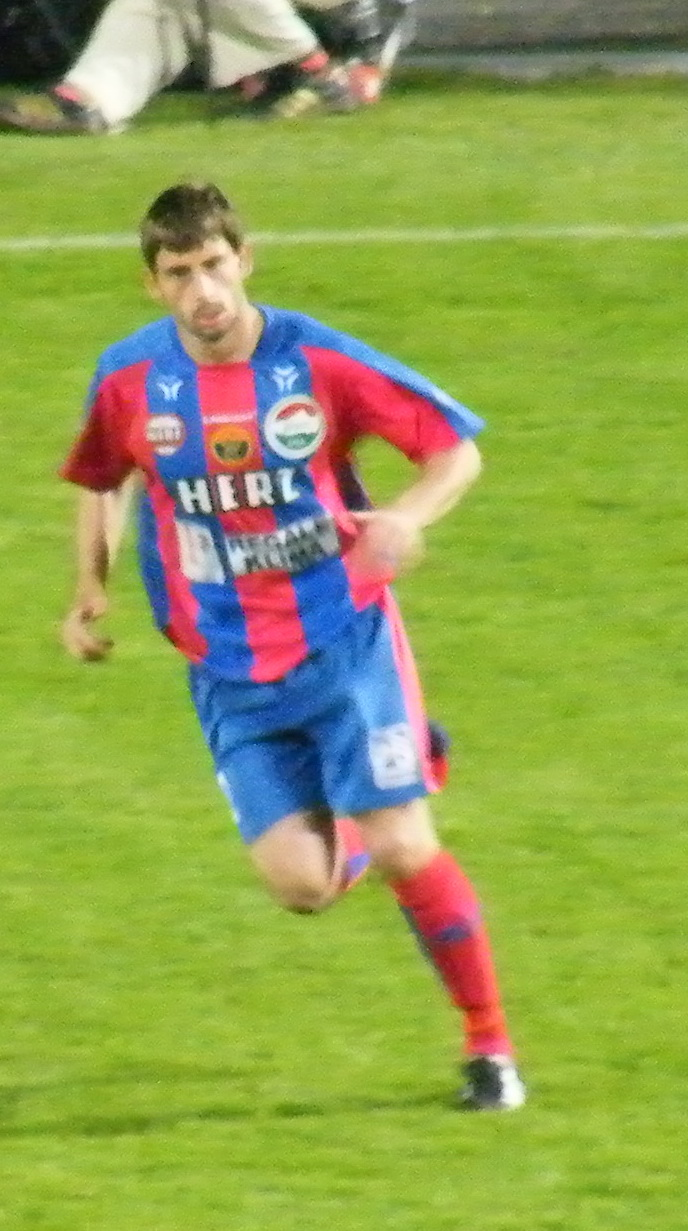
- Vukelja with Vasas

Personal information
- Full name: Ljubiša Vukelja
- Date of birth: 22 July 1983 (age 43)
- Place of birth: Novi Sad, SFR Yugoslavia
- Height: 1.81 m (5 ft 11 in)
- Position: Forward

Youth career
- 1993–1995: ŽSK Žabalj
- 1995–2001: Vojvodina

Senior career*
Years	Team	Apps	(Gls)
2001–2006	Vojvodina	107	(22)
2006–2007	Partizan	8	(0)
2007	→ Ethnikos Achna (loan)	3	(0)
2008	Vojvodina	4	(0)
2008–2010	Borac Banja Luka	24	(6)
2009	→ Vasas (loan)	11	(2)
2011	Śląsk Wrocław	1	(0)
2011	Slavija Sarajevo	6	(1)
2012	Čelik Nikšić	12	(2)
2013	Radnički Klupci	13	(2)
2014–2015	Proleter Novi Sad	30	(4)
2015–2018	Nordvärmlands FF	55	(11)
2018–2019	Radnički Zrenjanin		
Total		274	(50)

International career
1999	FR Yugoslavia U16 (Note: Official UEFA matches only)	1	(0)
2004	Serbia and Montenegro U21	2	(3)
- * Club domestic league appearances and goals

Ljubiša Vukelja (Serbian Cyrillic: Љубиша Вукеља; born 22 July 1983) is a Serbian former footballer who played as a forward.

== Club career ==
Vukelja came through the youth system of Vojvodina, making his first-team debut in 2001. He collected over 100 league appearances for the club in the top flight and scored 22 goals. In June 2006, Vukelja signed a four-year deal with Partizan.

Between 2008 and 2012, Vukelja played for several clubs abroad, including Borac Banja Luka, Vasas, Śląsk Wrocław, Slavija Sarajevo and Čelik Nikšić.

In July 2015, Vukelja moved to Sweden and signed with Nordvärmlands FF. He scored three goals in 10 appearances until the end of the year in Div 2 Norra Götaland, as the club suffered relegation from the league. In the 2016 season, Vukelja scored six goals in 19 matches in Div 3 Västra Svealand, helping the side earn promotion back to the fourth tier of Swedish football. He appeared in 14 games and scored two goals in the 2017 Div 2 Norra Götaland. In the 2018 season, Vukelja made 12 appearances in Div 2 Norra Götaland, scoring no goals.

== International career ==
Vukelja represented Serbia and Montenegro at under-21 level, scoring a hat-trick in a 5–0 win over San Marino during the UEFA Under-21 Championship 2006 qualifying stage.

== Honours ==
Borac Banja Luka

- Bosnia and Herzegovina Cup: 2009–10

Čelik Nikšić

- Montenegrin Cup: 2011–12
- Montenegrin Second League: 2011–12
