= Karim Benounes =

Algerian footballer (born 1984)

Personal information
- Date of birth: 9 February 1984 (age 42)
- Place of birth: Lille, France
- Height: 1.75 m (5 ft 9 in)
- Position: Midfielder

Youth career
- 2002–2003: Lille

Senior career*
| Years | Team | Apps | (Gls) |
| 2003–2004 | Ølstykke FC | 15 | (5) |
| 2004–2005 | Al-Kharitiyath | 12 | (5) |
| 2005–2006 | ES Sétif | 12 | (1) |
| 2006–2008 | L'Entente SSG | 32 | (1) |
| 2008 | Zhejiang Lucheng | 24 | (6) |
| 2009–2011 | Vasas | 20 | (6) |
| 2012 | Egri FC | 5 | (0) |
| 2012 | CS Constantine | 2 | (0) |
| 2013 | PK-35 | 14 | (5) |

International career^{‡}
| 2003–2004 | Algeria U23 | 8 | (0) |
| 2004 | Algeria | 1 | (0) |
- * Club domestic league appearances and goals as of 19:39, 1 March 2019 (UTC) ‡ National team caps and goals as of 30 July 2010

Karim Benounes (born 9 February 1984) is an Algerian international footballer. He plays as a midfielder.

== Career ==
Benounes was born in Lille, France. On 28 February 2010, he made his league debut for Hungarian team Vasas SC in a 3–2 loss to Nyíregyháza Spartacus.
