= Szabolcs Bakos =

Hungarian footballer

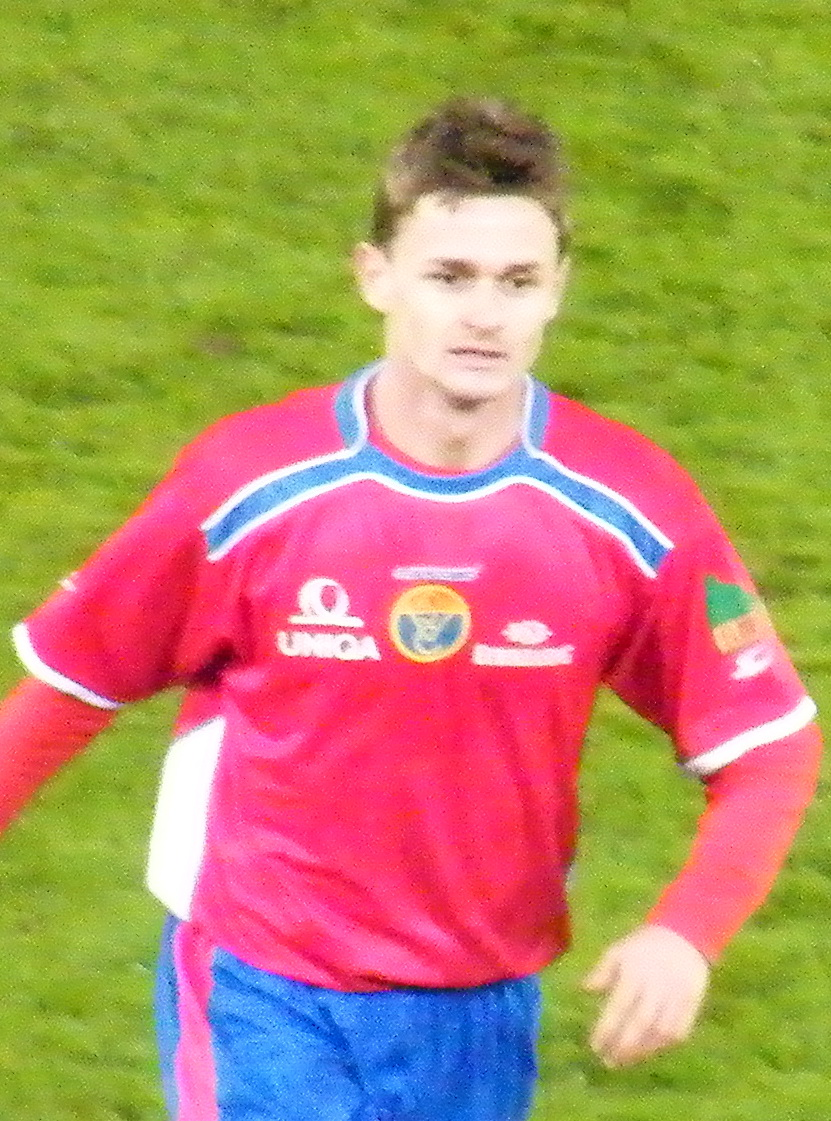

Personal information
- Date of birth: 4 February 1987 (age 39)
- Place of birth: Timișoara, Romania
- Height: 1.76 m (5 ft 9 in)
- Position: Midfielder

Team information
- Current team: Csákvár
- Number: 8

Senior career*
Years	Team	Apps	(Gls)
2008–2009	III. Kerület	29	(14)
2009–2012	Vasas	53	(1)
2009	→ Felcsút (loan)	13	(2)
2012	→ Baja (loan)	15	(2)
2012–2014	Tatabánya	54	(3)
2014–2017	Csákvár	84	(8)
2017–2018	Budaörs	31	(4)
2018–2019	Nyíregyháza	20	(0)
2019–2020	Budaörs	20	(2)
2020–2021	III. Kerület		
2021	Mosonmagyaróvár		
2021–	Csákvár	13	(0)
- * Club domestic league appearances and goals as of 9 February 2022

Szabolcs Bakos (born 4 February 1987) is a professional Hungarian footballer who plays for Csákvár.
