= Vakhtang Pantskhava =

Georgian footballer

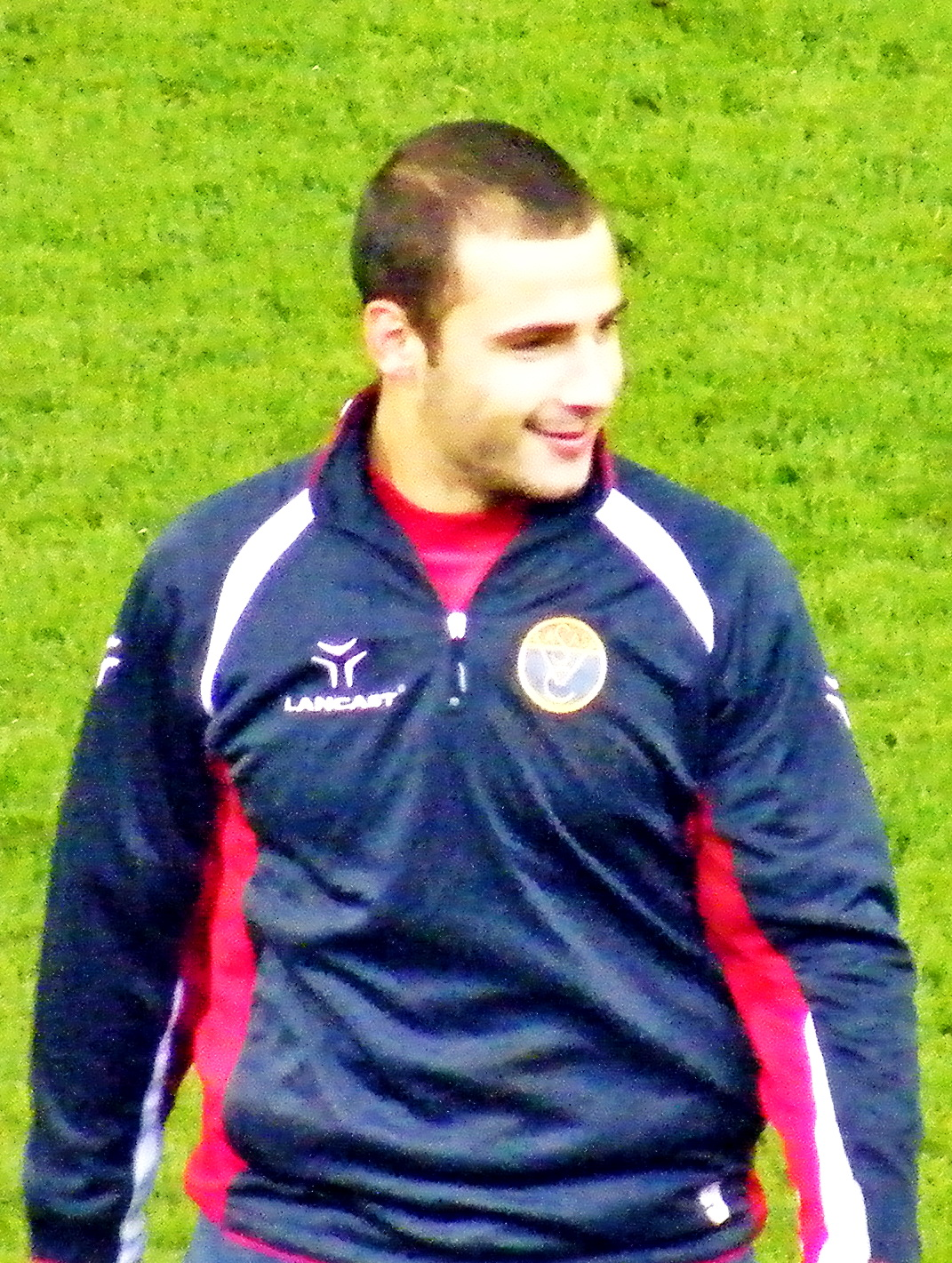

Personal information
- Full name: Vakhtang Pantskhava
- Date of birth: 13 October 1989 (age 37)
- Place of birth: Tskaltubo, Georgia
- Height: 1.83 m (6 ft 0 in)
- Position: Forward

Team information
- Current team: FC Dinamo Tbilisi
- Number: 10

Youth career
- 2005–2007: FC Gagra Tbilisi

Senior career*
Years	Team	Apps	(Gls)
2007–2008	FC Gagra Tbilisi	?	(?)
2008–2010	Le Mans UC 72 B	11	(4)
2009	→ Metalist Kharkiv (loan)	0	(0)
2010–2011	Győri ETO FC	5	(0)
2011	Vasas SC	12	(1)
2011–	FC Dinamo Tbilisi	8	(2)

International career
2009–	Georgia U-21	15	(9)
- * Club domestic league appearances and goals as of 18 August 2011

Vakhtang Pantskhava (born 8 October 1989) is a Georgian football player. He previously played for Győri ETO FC.
