= Marcell Matolcsi =

Hungarian footballer

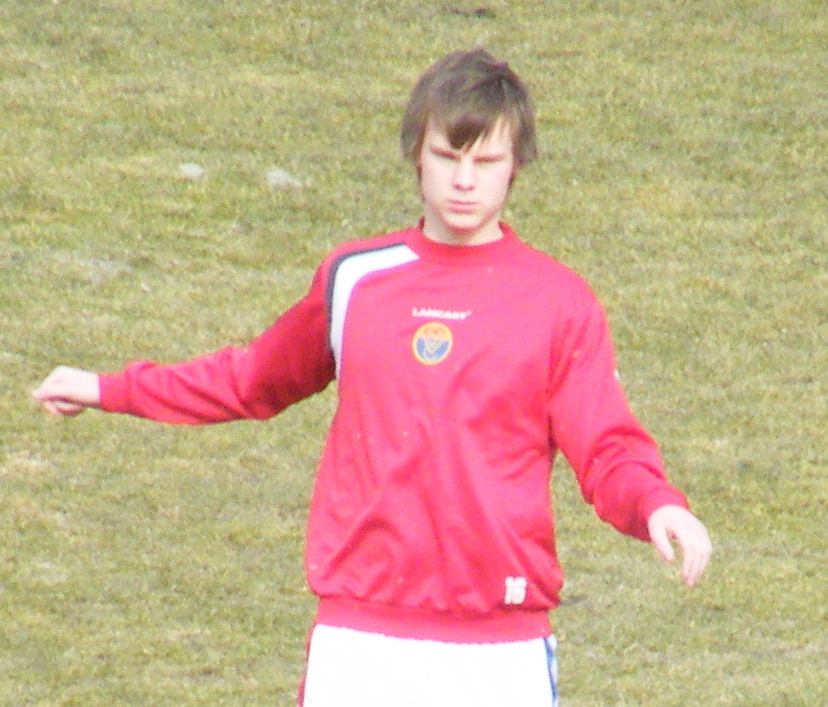

Personal information
- Date of birth: February 1, 1991 (age 35)
- Place of birth: Budapest, Hungary
- Height: 1.86 m (6 ft 1 in)
- Position: Defender

Team information
- Current team: Vasas SC
- Number: 26

Youth career
- 2003–2012: Vasas SC

Senior career*
| Years | Team | Apps | (Gls) |
| 2012– | Vasas SC | 1 | (0) |
- * Club domestic league appearances and goals as of 20 May 2012

Marcell Matolcsi (born 1 February 1991, in Budapest) is a professional Hungarian footballer who currently plays for Vasas SC.

== Career statistics ==
Appearances and goals by club, season and competition
| Club | Season | League | | | Cup | | League Cup | | Europe | | Total | |
| Club | Season | Division | Apps | Goals | Apps | Goals | Apps | Goals | Apps | Goals | Apps | Goals |
|---|---|---|---|---|---|---|---|---|---|---|---|---|
Vasas
| Vasas | 2009–10 | Nemzeti Bajnokság I | 0 | 0 | 1 | 0 | 1 | 0 | 0 | 0 | 2 | 0 |
| Vasas | 2010–11 | Nemzeti Bajnokság I | 0 | 0 | 1 | 0 | 0 | 0 | 0 | 0 | 1 | 0 |
| Vasas | 2011–12 | Nemzeti Bajnokság I | 1 | 0 | 0 | 0 | 1 | 0 | 0 | 0 | 2 | 0 |
| Vasas | Total | | 1 | 0 | 2 | 0 | 2 | 0 | 0 | 0 | 5 | 0 |
| Career total | | | 1 | 0 | 2 | 0 | 2 | 0 | 0 | 0 | 5 | 0 |

Updated to games played as of 20 May 2012.
