= József Piller =

Hungarian footballer

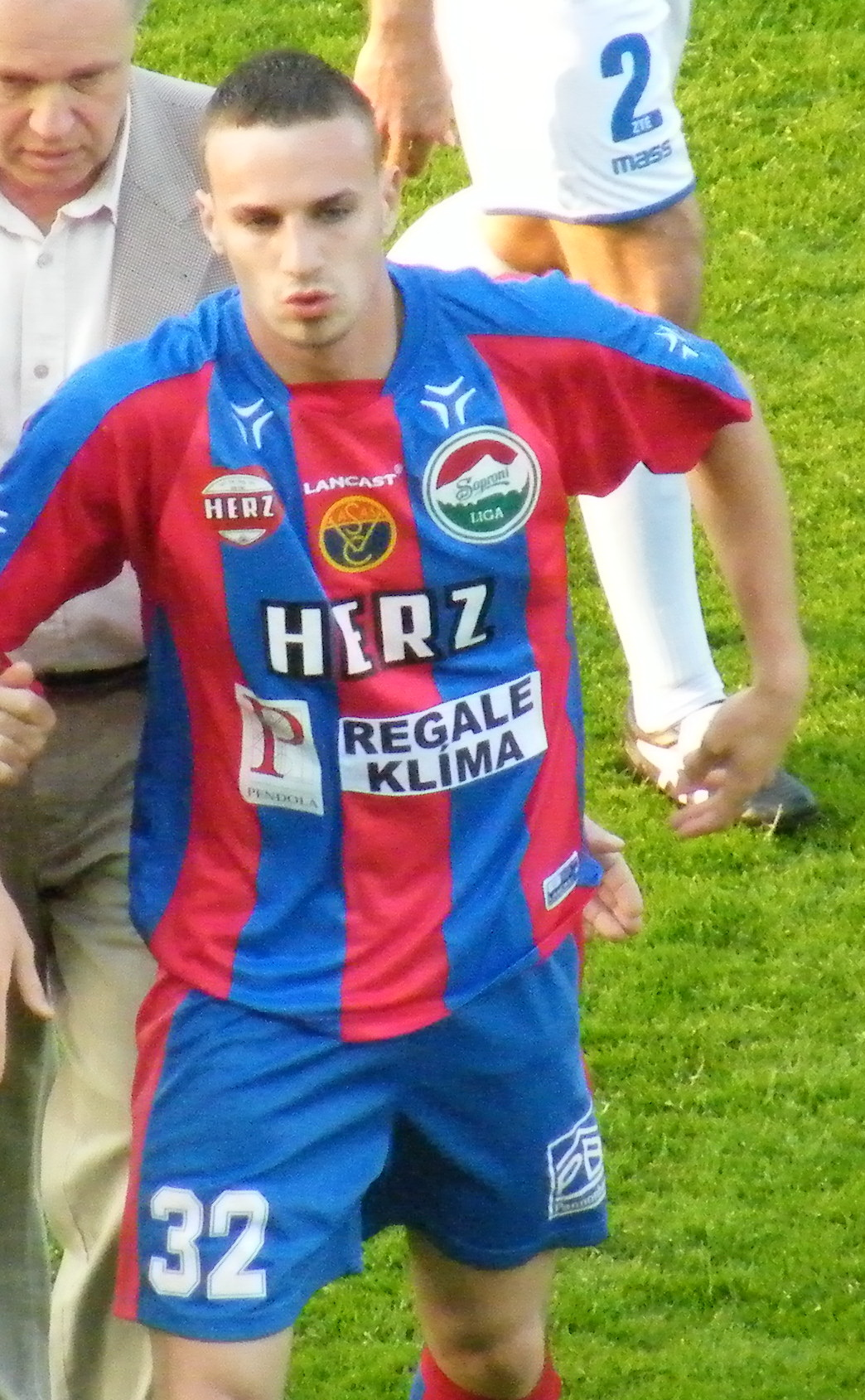

Personal information
- Date of birth: 16 August 1988 (age 38)
- Place of birth: Budapest, Hungary
- Height: 1.82 m (6 ft 0 in)
- Position: Defender

Youth career
- 2003–2006: Vasas

Senior career*
Years	Team	Apps	(Gls)
2006–2011	Vasas	66	(2)
2010	→ Siófok (loan)	7	(0)
2011–2012	Veendam	2	(0)
2012–2013	Eger	11	(0)
2014–	Vasas	1	(0)
- * Club domestic league appearances and goals as of 1 March 2014

József Piller (born 16 August 1988 in Budapest) is a retired Hungarian football forward player who last played for Vasas SC.
