= Ákos Tulipán =

Hungarian footballer

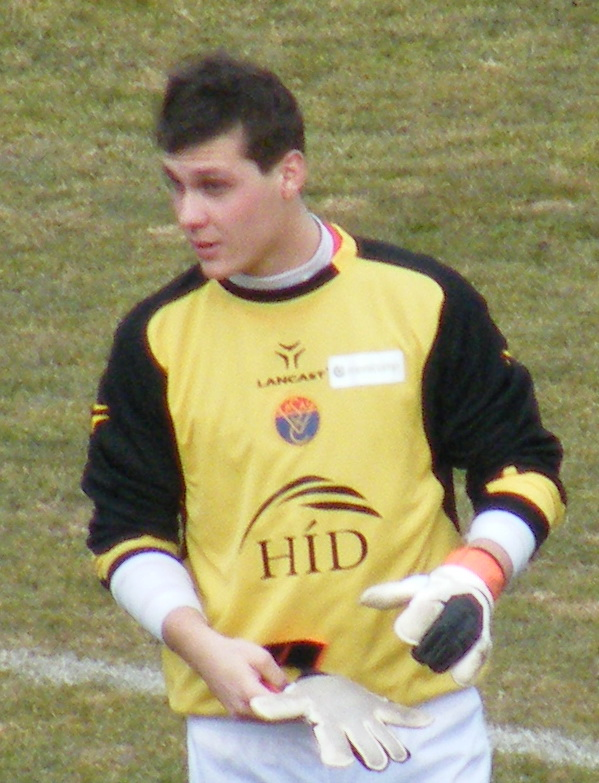

Personal information
- Full name: Ákos Tulipán
- Date of birth: 16 November 1990 (age 36)
- Place of birth: Eger, Hungary
- Height: 1.87 m (6 ft 2 in)
- Position: Goalkeeper

Team information
- Current team: Dorogi
- Number: 33

Youth career
- 2003–2005: Ferencváros
- 2005–2008: Vasas

Senior career*
Years	Team	Apps	(Gls)
2008–2011	Vasas	2	(0)
2011–2012	Budaörs	4	(0)
2012–2013	Baja	21	(0)
2013–2015	Ajka	8	(0)
2015–2017	Budaörs	5	(0)
2017–2020	Cegléd	22	(0)
2020	Taksony	0	(0)
2020–	Dorogi	16	(0)
- * Club domestic league appearances and goals as of 30 May 2023

Ákos Tulipán (born 16 November 1990) is a Hungarian professional footballer who plays for Dorogi FC.

== Club statistics ==
Appearances and goals by club, season and competition
Club	Season	League			Cup		League Cup		Europe		Total	
Club	Season	Division	Apps	Goals	Apps	Goals	Apps	Goals	Apps	Goals	Apps	Goals
Vasas
Vasas	2008–09	Nemzeti Bajnokság I	0	0	0	0	7	0	0	0	7	0
Vasas	2009–10	Nemzeti Bajnokság I	2	0	1	0	2	0	0	0	5	0
Vasas	2010–11	Nemzeti Bajnokság I	0	0	1	0	2	0	0	0	3	0
Vasas	Total		2	0	2	0	11	0	0	0	15	0
Budaörs	2011–12	Nemzeti Bajnokság II	4	0	1	0	0	0	0	0	5	0
Baja	2012–13	Nemzeti Bajnokság II	21	0	1	0	0	0	0	0	22	0
Ajka	2013–14	Nemzeti Bajnokság II	5	0	2	0	3	0	0	0	10	0
Career total			32	0	6	0	14	0	0	0	52	0

Updated to games played as of 1 June 2014.
