= Saša Dobrić =

Serbian footballer

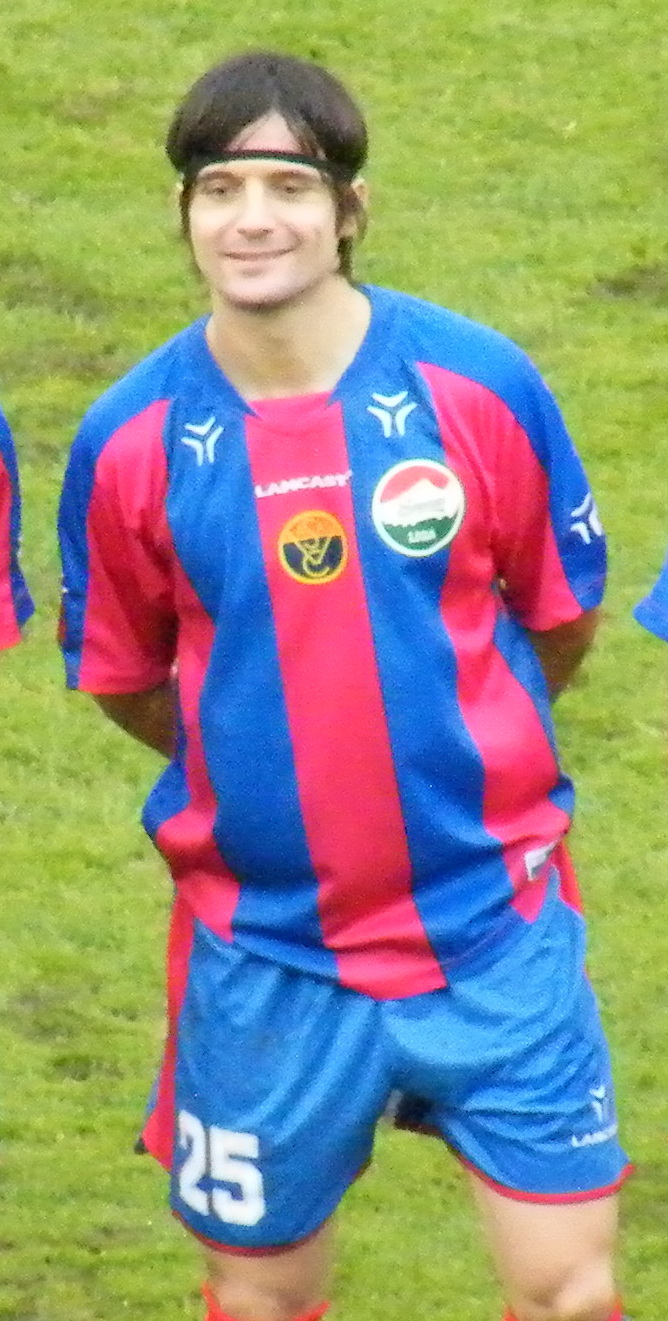

Personal information
- Date of birth: 24 January 1982 (age 44)
- Place of birth: Benkovac, SR Croatia, Yugoslavia
- Height: 1.77 m (5 ft 10 in)
- Position: Midfielder

Youth career
- 1992–1995: Velebit
- 1995–1998: Vojvodina

Senior career*
Years	Team	Apps	(Gls)
1998–2008	Vojvodina	50	(5)
2001–2002	→ Rudar Ugljevik (loan)		
2002	→ Veternik (loan)	5	(0)
2003	→ Kabel (loan)	5	(0)
2004	→ Veternik (loan)	12	(2)
2004	→ Degerfors IF (loan)		
2005	→ Proleter Zrenjanin (loan)	19	(2)
2007	→ Trollhättan (loan)		
2008	→ ČSK Čelarevo (loan)	16	(3)
2008–2011	Vasas	55	(9)
2011	Vostok	13	(2)
2011–2013	Eger	36	(5)
2013	Voždovac	0	(0)
2013	→ BSK Borča (loan)	12	(3)
2014–2015	Dolina Padina	13	(2)

International career
- FR Yugoslavia U21
- * Club domestic league appearances and goals

Saša Dobrić (Serbian Cyrillic: Саша Добрић; born 24 January 1982) is a Serbian former professional footballer who played as a midfielder.

Born in Benkovac (SR Croatia, SFR Yugoslavia), he started playing in a local club NK Velebit in 1992. In 1995, he moved to Serbia and joined the youth team of FK Vojvodina where he played almost continuously until 2008.

He was part of the FR Yugoslavia U-21 team.
