= Gábor Polényi =

Hungarian footballer

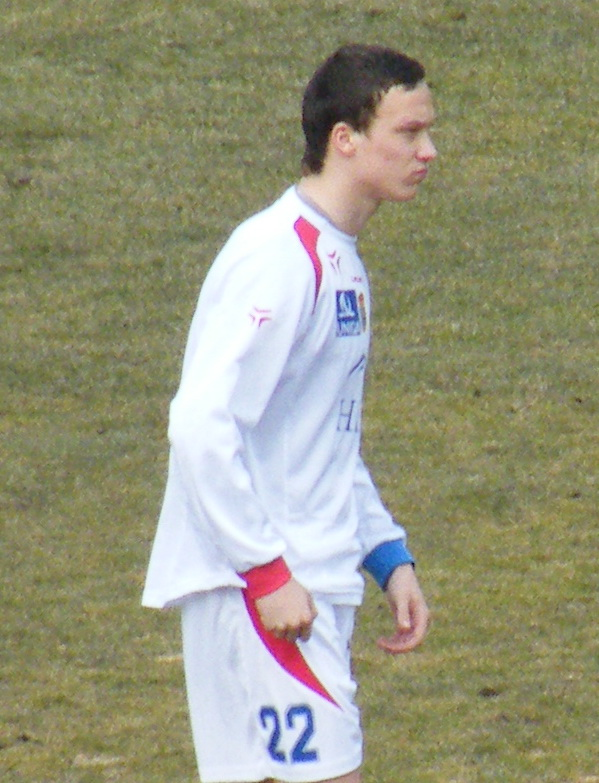

Personal information
- Date of birth: 2 July 1991 (age 35)
- Place of birth: Miskolc, Hungary
- Height: 1.83 m (6 ft 0 in)
- Position: Right back

Team information
- Current team: Siófok
- Number: 18

Youth career
- 2003–2009: Diósgyőr

Senior career*
Years	Team	Apps	(Gls)
2009–2011	Diósgyőr	4	(0)
2010–2011	→ Vasas (loan)	9	(0)
2011–2013	Vasas	17	(1)
2013	→ Putnok (loan)	13	(0)
2013–2014	Nyíregyháza	17	(0)
2014–2015	Vasas	8	(0)
2015	→ Siófok (loan)	12	(0)
2015–2016	Mezőkövesd	12	(0)
2016–2018	Zalaegerszeg	39	(2)
2018–2019	Nyíregyháza	36	(1)
2019–2020	Békéscsaba	8	(0)
2020–	Siófok	110	(0)
- * Club domestic league appearances and goals as of 21 December 2023

Gábor Polényi (born 2 July 1991) is a Hungarian football player who plays for Siófok.
