= Balázs B. Tóth =

Hungarian footballer

Balázs Tóth
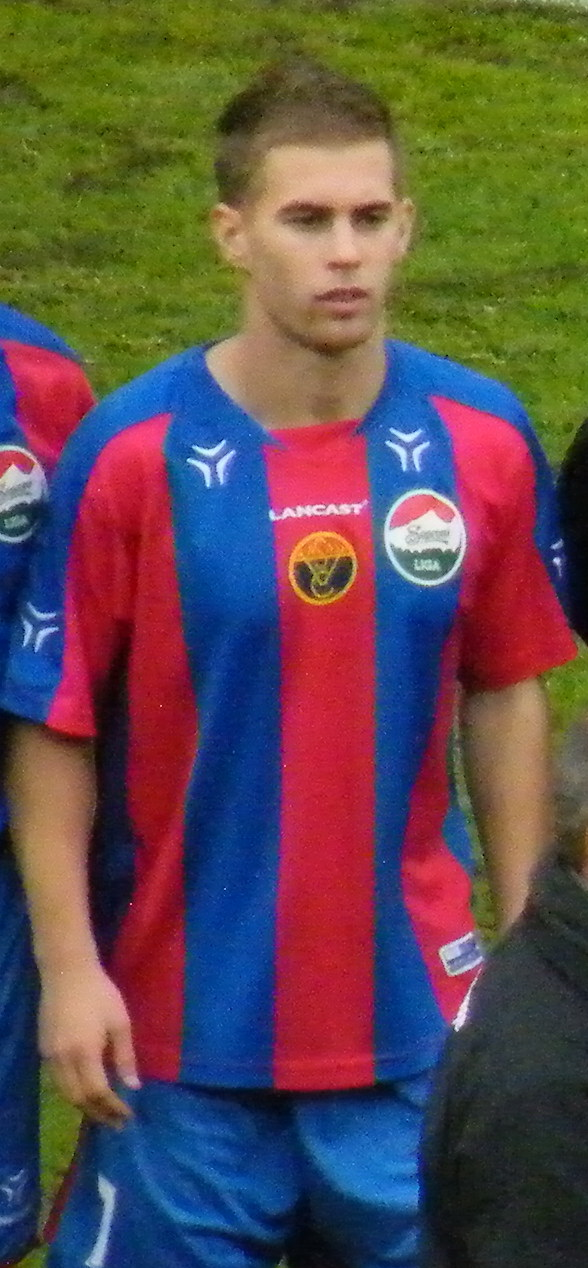

Personal information
- Full name: Balázs B. Tóth
- Date of birth: 14 July 1986 (age 40)
- Place of birth: Szolnok, Hungary
- Height: 1.81 m (5 ft 11 1/2 in)
- Position: Midfielder

Team information
- Current team: Szolnok
- Number: 14

Youth career
- 2003–2004: Rákóczifalva

Senior career*
Years	Team	Apps	(Gls)
2004–2007	Szolnok	74	(9)
2007–2010	Vasas	67	(3)
2010–2011	Paks	4	(0)
2011	→ Siófok (loan)	0	(0)
2011–	Szolnok	62	(6)
- * Club domestic league appearances and goals as of 9 March 2014

Balázs B. Tóth (born 14 July 1986, in Szolnok) is a Hungarian football player who currently plays for Szolnoki MÁV FC.
