= Dušan Mileusnić =

Serbian footballer

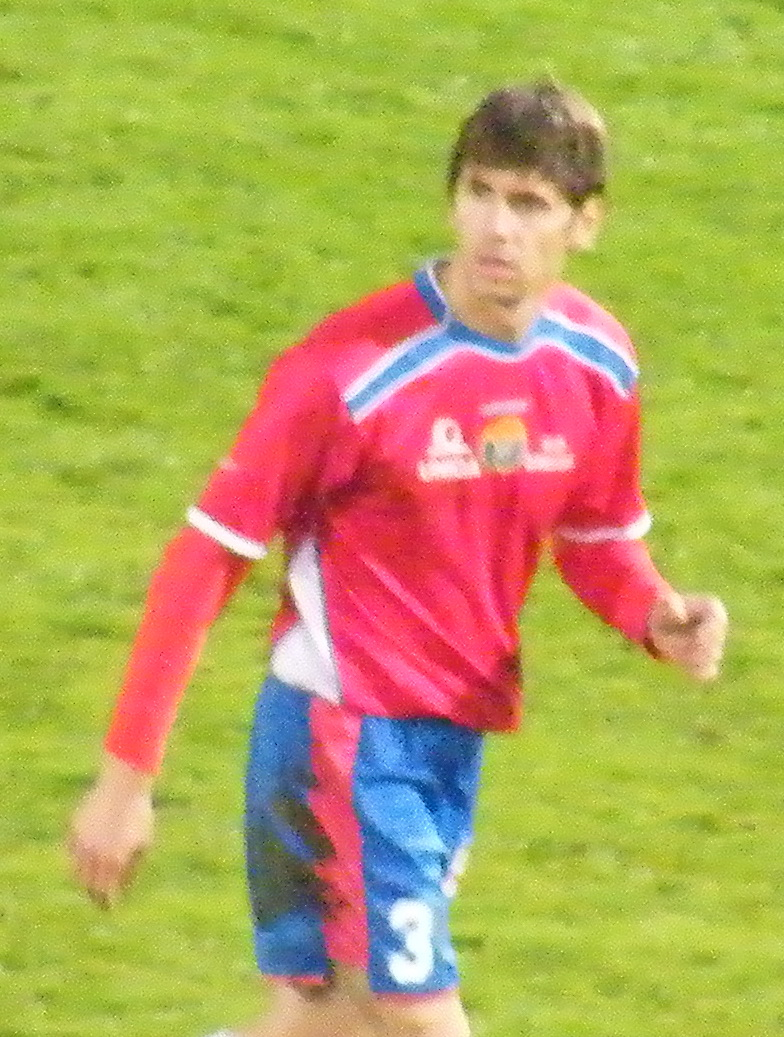

Personal information
- Full name: Dušan Mileusnić
- Date of birth: 10 April 1984 (age 42)
- Place of birth: Belgrade, SFR Yugoslavia
- Height: 1.84 m (6 ft 0 in)
- Position: Defender

Senior career*
Years	Team	Apps	(Gls)
2002–2009	BASK		
2010–2012	Vasas	48	(1)
2013–2016	Novigrad	33	(1)
- * Club domestic league appearances and goals as of 29 November 2014

Dušan Mileusnić (Serbian Cyrillic: Душан Милеуснић; born 10 April 1984 in Belgrade) is a Serbian retired footballer.

== Career ==
Mileusnić began his career by FK BASK and moved to Vasas Budapest in 2010. On 28 February 2010, he signed for Hungarian club Vasas SC. In 2013, he signed for the Treća HNL Zapad side Novigrad.
