= Bobô (footballer, born 1982) =

Brazilian footballer

Personal information
- Full name: José Claudeon dos Santos
- Date of birth: 20 March 1982 (age 44)
- Place of birth: Propriá, Sergipe, Brazil
- Height: 1.84 m (6 ft 0 in)
- Position: Forward

Youth career
- 2000: Propriá
- 2000−2001: Campomaiorense

Senior career*
Years	Team	Apps	(Gls)
2001–2002	Leixões		
2002–2003	Elvas		
2003–2004	AA Meruge		
2004–2005	Mileu Guarda		
2005–2006	AD Sátão		
2006–2009	Sanjoanense	13	(4)
2009–2011	Moreirense	62	(13)
2011–2012	Fafe	11	(7)
2012–2013	Vasas	19	(3)
2013–2015	Boavista	36	(18)
2015–2018	AR São Martinho	73	(24)
2018–2020	Tirsense	59	(25)
- * Club domestic league appearances and goals

José Claudeon dos Santos (born 20 March 1982), better known as Bobô, is a Brazilian former professional footballer who played as a forward.

== Career ==
Born in Propriá, Bobô started in his hometown club, Esporte Clube Propriá, moving as an 18-year-old to Portugal, to join Campomaiorense youth ranks.

After several years in Portuguese lower divisions, Bobô made his professional debut for Moreirense on 29 August 2010 in a home win against Estoril Praia. He represented the second tier team for two seasons, with more than a dozen league goals. In 2012, he moved to Hungary, joining Vasas, in the Hungarian second tier, scoring only three times in nearly 20 caps.

A year later, Bobô returned to Portugal, joining Boavista in 2013 in the third tier. In January 2014, he had a particular prolific spell, scoring 12 goals in 13 matches sparking interest in his home country. With the return of Boavista to the Primeira Liga, Bobô made his debut in the first tier on 17 August 2014, in a match against Braga. He left Boavista in 2015 to play for AR São Martinho in the Campeonato de Portugal.

== Personal life ==
He is the younger brother of Detinho, a former professional footballer.
