= 2011–12 Vasas SC season =

Vasas
2011–12 season
- Chairman: László Markovits
- Manager: András Komjáti (until 15 August); Marijan Vlak (from 15 August to 16 January); Flórián Urbán (from 16 January)
- Nemzeti Bajnokság I: 15th (relegated)
- Magyar Kupa: Round of 32
- Ligakupa: Group stage
- Top goalscorer: League: Jusuf Dajić (5); All: Marko Šimić (7)
- Highest home attendance: 4,500 v Diósgyőr (5 November 2011)
- Lowest home attendance: 100 v Mezőkövesd (16 November 2011)
Home colours	Away colours

The 2011–12 season was Vasas Sport Club's 84th competitive season, 8th consecutive season in the Nemzeti Bajnokság and 100th year in existence as a football club.

== First team squad ==
Note: Flags indicate national team as defined under FIFA eligibility rules; some limited exceptions apply. Players may hold more than one non-FIFA nationality.

No.	Pos.	Nation	Player
1	GK	SVK	Luboš Ilizi
2	DF	HUN	Balázs Tóth
3	DF	HUN	Gábor Varga
4	DF	HUN	Máté Tóth
5	DF	CRO	Haris Mehmedagić
6	DF	HUN	Gábor Kovács
7	FW	BIH	Jusuf Dajić
8	MF	HUN	Dániel Kovács
9	DF	HUN	Bence Szabó (loan from Újpest FC)
10	MF	HUN	Zsolt Bárányos
11	MF	HUN	Ádám Kovács
13	DF	HUN	Zoltán Takács (loan from Újpest FC)
14	FW	HUN	Zoltán Hercegfalvi
15	DF	HUN	Máté Katona
17	MF	HUN	Zoltán Farkas
18	MF	HUN	Dávid Görgényi
19	MF	HUN	Tamás Kiss (loan from Rákospalotai EAC)

No.	Pos.	Nation	Player
20	DF	HUN	Zsolt Merczel
21	MF	HUN	Csaba Ferkó
22	DF	HUN	Gábor Polényi
23	DF	HUN	Tamás Rubus (loan from Újpest FC)
24	FW	HUN	Patrik Csoór
25	FW	HUN	József Boda
26	DF	HUN	Marcell Matolcsi
28	MF	HUN	Zsolt Huszárik
33	DF	SRB	Dušan Mileusnić
34	MF	HUN	Salem Reidan
41	MF	HUN	Balázs Farkas
66	DF	HUN	Gábor Gyepes
87	FW	NGR	Kasali Casal
87	DF	CRO	Jurica Pranjić
88	MF	HUN	Péter Simek
99	FW	GHA	Bradley Hudson-Odoi

== Transfers ==
=== Summer ===
In: Note: Flags indicate national team as defined under FIFA eligibility rules; some limited exceptions apply. Players may hold more than one non-FIFA nationality.

No.	Pos.	Nation	Player
1	GK	HUN	Péter Halasi (from Videoton FC II)
2	DF	CMR	Makadji Boukar (from Nyíregyháza Spartacus FC)
2	DF	HUN	László Szűcs (from (Germany) SSV Jahn Regensburg)
4	DF	HUN	Gábor Kocsis (from Videoton FC II)
4	DF	ROU	Mirel Sorin Soare (from CS Alro Slatina)
5	DF	CRO	Haris Mehmedagić (from (Croatia) NK Lučko)
7	MF	HUN	Dávid Kulcsár (from Ferencvárosi TC)
10	MF	HUN	Zsolt Bárányos (from Lombard-Pápa TFC)
11	FW	BIH	Jusuf Dajić (from (China) Shanghai East Asia F.C.)
13	DF	SVK	Dávid Radványi (from (Slovakia) FK DAC 1904 Dunajská Streda)
16	DF	HUN	Zsolt Merczel (from BKV Előre SC)
17	FW	CRO	Marko Šimić (from (Croatia) NK Lokomotiva)
19	MF	SRB	Miloš Jokić (from Szolnoki MÁV FC)
20	MF	HUN	Zoltán Farkas (from Kaposvári Rákóczi FC)
22	DF	HUN	Gábor Polényi (from Diósgyőri VTK)
23	DF	HUN	Artúr Papizsanszkij (from Videoton FC II)
24	FW	HUN	Ádám Balla (from (Switzerland) FC Grenchen)
26	MF	HUN	Balázs Farkas (from Videoton FC I)
28	MF	HUN	Péter Simek (from Újpest FC)
30	GK	SVK	Luboš Ilizi (from (Czech Republic) FC Viktoria Plzeň)
33	FW	NGR	Kasali Yinka Casal (from (Romania) CFR Cluj)
55	DF	HUN	László Sütő (loan from MTK Budapest FC)
70	FW	JPN	Kazuo Homma (from Nyíregyháza Spartacus FC)
86	GK	MNE	Ivan Janjušević (from (Montenegro) FK Mogren)
88	FW	GHA	Bradley Hudson-Odoi (from (England) Thurrock F.C.)
92	GK	HUN	Róbert Ambrusics (from (England) Leicester City F.C.)
––	FW	HUN	Szabolcs Gál (from (Romania) FC Bihor Oradea)
––	MF	HUN	Gábor Bogdán (loan return from Békéscsaba 1912 Előre SE)

Out: Note: Flags indicate national team as defined under FIFA eligibility rules; some limited exceptions apply. Players may hold more than one non-FIFA nationality.

No.	Pos.	Nation	Player
1	GK	HUN	Zoltán Végh (to Ferencvárosi TC)
2	DF	CMR	Makadji Boukar (unattached)
4	DF	SRB	Goran Arnaut (unattached)
5	MF	HUN	Salem Reidan (loan to BKV Előre SC)
9	MF	HUN	László Rezes (loan return to Debreceni VSC)
10	MF	SRB	Čedomir Pavićević (to Egri FC)
11	FW	HUN	János Lázok (to (Germany) MSV Duisburg)
13	FW	HUN	István Ferenczi (to Lombard-Pápa TFC)
13	DF	SVK	Dávid Radványi (loan to Nyíregyháza Spartacus FC)
17	FW	MKD	Simeon Hristov (to Egri FC)
21	MF	HUN	Norbert Németh (to Budapest Honvéd FC)
24	DF	HUN	Ádám Présinger (loan return to Videoton FC)
25	FW	HUN	Péter Szilágyi (loan return to Debreceni VSC)
26	MF	HUN	Csaba Ponczók (loan return to Videoton FC)
27	DF	HUN	Zsolt Balog (to Egri FC)
28	MF	HUN	Krisztián Lisztes (to Ferencvárosi TC)
29	MF	HUN	Patrik Nagy (loan return to (Austria) SK Rapid Wien)
31	MF	HUN	Roland Mundi (to Szolnoki MÁV FC)
32	FW	HUN	József Piller (to (Netherlands) FC Volendam)
33	GK	HUN	Gábor Németh (to Kecskeméti TE)
59	FW	ALG	Karim Benounes (unattached)
70	FW	JPN	Kazuo Homma (to Ferencvárosi TC)
86	GK	MNE	Ivan Janjušević (unattached)
––	GK	HUN	Ákos Tulipán (to Budaörsi SC)
––	MF	HUN	Gábor Bogdán (unattached)

=== Winter ===
In: Note: Flags indicate national team as defined under FIFA eligibility rules; some limited exceptions apply. Players may hold more than one non-FIFA nationality.

No.	Pos.	Nation	Player
3	DF	HUN	Gábor Varga (from Lombard-Pápa TFC)
4	DF	HUN	Máté Tóth (from (Czech Republic) FC Hradec Králové)
9	FW	HUN	Bence Szabó (on loan from Újpest FC)
11	MF	HUN	Ádám Kovács (from Nyíregyháza Spartacus)
13	DF	HUN	Zoltán Takács (on loan from Újpest FC)
14	FW	HUN	Zoltán Hercegfalvi (from Budapest Honvéd FC II)
16	DF	HUN	Balázs Venczel (from Lombard-Pápa TFC)
19	MF	HUN	Tamás Kiss (on loan from Rákospalotai EAC)
23	DF	HUN	Tamás Rubus (on loan from Újpest FC)

Out: Note: Flags indicate national team as defined under FIFA eligibility rules; some limited exceptions apply. Players may hold more than one non-FIFA nationality.

No.	Pos.	Nation	Player
2	DF	HUN	László Szűcs (on loan to Sársápi Bányász)
4	DF	ROU	Mirel Soare (to (Romania) FC Argeş Piteşti)
7	MF	HUN	Dávid Kulcsár (to Ferencvárosi TC)
8	MF	HUN	Szabolcs Bakos (on loan to Bajai LSE)
9	FW	HUN	Gergő Beliczky (to Ferencvárosi TC)
13	DF	HUN	Gábor Kocsis (to Dunaújváros Pálhalma SE)
14	MF	SRB	Lazar Arsić (to Lombard-Pápa TFC)
17	FW	CRO	Marko Šimić (to Ferencvárosi TC)
19	MF	SRB	Miloš Jokić (to (Ukraine) FC Metalurh Zaporizhzhia)
36	DF	SVK	Jozef Gašpar
55	DF	HUN	László Sütő (loan return to MTK Budapest FC)
92	GK	HUN	Róbert Ambrusics (to (England) Cambridge United F.C.)

- List of Hungarian football transfer summer 2011
- List of Hungarian football transfers winter 2011–12

== Statistics ==
=== Appearances and goals ===
Last updated on 27 May 2012.

No.	Pos	Nat	Player	Total		OTP Bank Liga		Hungarian Cup		League Cup	
No.	Pos	Nat	Player	Apps	Goals	Apps	Goals	Apps	Goals	Apps	Goals
1	GK	(Slovakia) SVK	Luboš Ilizi	32	-54	29	-47	2	-3	1	-4
2	DF	(Hungary) HUN	Balázs Tóth	6	2	6	2	0	0	0	0
3	DF	(Hungary) HUN	Gábor Varga	8	0	8	0	0	0	0	0
4	DF	(Hungary) HUN	Máté Tóth	5	0	5	0	0	0	0	0
5	DF	(Croatia) CRO	Haris Mehmedagić	26	3	21	1	2	1	3	1
6	DF	(Hungary) HUN	Gábor Kovács	34	3	29	3	2	0	3	0
7	FW	(Bosnia and Herzegovina) BIH	Jusuf Dajić	29	6	25	5	2	1	2	0
8	MF	(Hungary) HUN	Dániel Kovács	6	0	6	0	0	0	0	0
9	FW	(Hungary) HUN	Bence Szabó	9	1	9	1	0	0	0	0
10	MF	(Hungary) HUN	Zsolt Bárányos	32	4	29	4	1	0	2	0
11	MF	(Hungary) HUN	Ádám Kovács	5	0	5	0	0	0	0	0
13	DF	(Hungary) HUN	Zoltán Takács	9	1	9	1	0	0	0	0
14	FW	(Hungary) HUN	Zoltán Hercegfalvi	7	0	7	0	0	0	0	0
15	DF	(Hungary) HUN	Máté Katona	25	1	20	1	1	0	4	0
17	MF	(Hungary) HUN	Zoltán Farkas	5	0	3	0	0	0	2	0
18	MF	(Hungary) HUN	Dávid Görgényi	8	1	7	1	0	0	1	0
19	MF	(Hungary) HUN	Tamás Kiss	5	0	5	0	0	0	0	0
20	DF	(Hungary) HUN	Zsolt Merczel	4	0	1	0	0	0	3	0
21	MF	(Hungary) HUN	Csaba Ferkó	21	2	13	1	2	0	6	1
22	DF	(Hungary) HUN	Gábor Polényi	11	0	4	0	1	0	6	0
23	DF	(Hungary) HUN	Tamás Rubus	3	0	3	0	0	0	0	0
24	FW	(Hungary) HUN	Patrik Csoór	6	0	5	0	0	0	1	0
25	FW	(Hungary) HUN	József Boda	4	1	2	0	0	0	2	1
26	DF	(Hungary) HUN	Marcell Matolcsi	2	0	1	0	0	0	1	0
28	MF	(Hungary) HUN	Zsolt Huszárik	3	0	3	0	0	0	0	0
33	DF	(Serbia) SRB	Dušan Mileusnić	6	0	6	0	0	0	0	0
34	MF	(Hungary) HUN	Salem Reidan	3	0	1	0	0	0	2	0
41	MF	(Hungary) HUN	Balázs Farkas	22	0	18	0	2	0	2	0
66	DF	(Hungary) HUN	Gábor Gyepes	4	0	4	0	0	0	0	0
87	DF	(Croatia) CRO	Jurica Pranjić	4	0	2	0	0	0	2	0
87	FW	(Nigeria) NGR	Kasali Casal	7	0	6	0	1	0	0	0
88	MF	(Hungary) HUN	Péter Simek	9	0	6	0	0	0	3	0
99	FW	(Ghana) GHA	Bradley Hudson-Odoi	7	2	6	0	0	0	1	2
Youth players
1	GK	(Hungary) HUN	Péter Halasi	2	-5	0	0	0	0	2	-5
20	FW	(Hungary) HUN	Szabolcs Gál	1	0	0	0	0	0	1	0
23	DF	(Hungary) HUN	Artur Papizsanszkij	3	0	0	0	0	0	3	0
24	FW	(Hungary) HUN	Ádám Balla	2	0	0	0	0	0	2	0
31	DF	(Hungary) HUN	Áron Mészáros	2	1	0	0	0	0	2	1
Players no longer at the club
2	DF	(Cameroon) CMR	Makadji Boukar	2	0	2	0	0	0	0	0
2	DF	(Hungary) HUN	László Szűcs	3	0	0	0	0	0	3	0
4	DF	(Romania) ROU	Mirel Soare	4	0	0	0	0	0	4	0
7	MF	(Hungary) HUN	Dávid Kulcsár	20	3	16	3	2	0	2	0
8	MF	(Hungary) HUN	Szabolcs Bakos	15	0	9	0	0	0	6	0
9	FW	(Hungary) HUN	Gergö Beliczky	17	4	12	1	2	0	3	3
13	DF	(Slovakia) SVK	Dávid Radványi	3	0	3	0	0	0	0	0
13	DF	(Hungary) HUN	Gábor Kocsis	3	0	0	0	1	0	2	0
14	MF	(Serbia) SRB	Lazar Arsić	11	0	6	0	1	0	4	0
17	FW	(Croatia) CRO	Marko Šimić	21	7	16	3	2	2	3	2
19	MF	(Serbia) SRB	Miloš Jokić	19	0	13	0	2	0	4	0
36	DF	(Slovakia) SVK	Jozef Gašpar	18	1	14	1	2	0	2	0
55	DF	(Hungary) HUN	László Sütő	13	0	11	0	0	0	2	0
70	FW	(Japan) JPN	Kazuo Homma	5	0	5	0	0	0	0	0
86	GK	(Montenegro) MNE	Ivan Janjušević	1	-5	1	-5	0	0	0	0
92	GK	(Hungary) HUN	Róbert Ambrusics	3	-9	0	0	0	0	3	-9

=== Top scorers ===
Includes all competitive matches. The list is sorted by shirt number when total goals are equal.

Last updated on 27 May 2012

Position	Nation	Number	Name	OTP Bank Liga	Hungarian Cup	League Cup	Total
1	(Croatia)	17	Marko Šimić	3	2	2	7
2	(Bosnia and Herzegovina)	7	Jusuf Dajić	5	1	0	6
3	(Hungary)	10	Zsolt Bárányos	4	0	0	4
4	(Hungary)	9	Gergö Beliczky	1	0	3	4
4	(Hungary)	7	Dávid Kulcsár	3	0	0	3
6	(Hungary)	6	Gábor Kovács	3	0	0	3
7	(Croatia)	5	Haris Mehmedagić	1	1	1	3
8	(Hungary)	2	Balázs Tóth	2	0	0	2
9	(Hungary)	21	Csaba Ferkó	1	0	1	2
10	(Ghana)	99	Bradley Hudson-Odoi	0	0	2	2
11	(Slovakia)	36	Jozef Gašpar	1	0	0	1
12	(Hungary)	15	Máté Katona	1	0	0	1
13	(Hungary)	9	Bence Szabó	1	0	0	1
14	(Hungary)	13	Zoltán Takács	1	0	0	1
15	(Hungary)	18	Dávid Görgényi	1	0	0	1
16	(Hungary)	25	József Boda	0	0	1	1
17	(Hungary)	31	Áron Mészáros	0	0	1	1
/	/	/	Own Goals	1	0	1	2
			TOTALS	29	4	12	45

=== Disciplinary record ===
Includes all competitive matches. Players with 1 card or more included only.

Last updated on 27 May 2012

Position	Nation	Number	Name	OTP Bank Liga		Hungarian Cup		League Cup		Total (Hu Total)	
Position	Nation	Number	Name	Booked	Sent off (straight red)	Booked	Sent off (straight red)	Booked	Sent off (straight red)	Booked	Sent off (straight red)
GK	(Slovakia)	1	Luboš Ilizi	1	0	0	0	0	0	1 (1)	0 (0)
DF	(Hungary)	3	Gábor Varga	2	0	0	0	0	0	2 (2)	0 (0)
DF	(Hungary)	4	Máté Tóth	1	0	0	0	0	0	1 (1)	0 (0)
DF	(Romania)	4	Mirel Soare	0	0	0	0	2	0	2 (0)	0 (0)
DF	(Croatia)	5	Haris Mehmedagić	9	0	0	0	0	0	9 (9)	0 (0)
DF	(Hungary)	6	Gábor Kovács	6	0	1	0	1	0	8 (6)	0 (0)
FW	(Bosnia and Herzegovina)	7	Jusuf Dajić	4	0	0	0	1	0	5 (4)	0 (0)
MF	(Hungary)	7	Dávid Kulcsár	4	0	0	0	0	0	4 (4)	0 (0)
MF	(Hungary)	8	Dániel Kovács	1	0	0	0	0	0	1 (1)	0 (0)
MF	(Hungary) (Romania)	8	Szabolcs Bakos	1	0	0	0	0	0	1 (1)	0 (0)
FW	(Hungary)	9	Gergö Beliczky	1	1	0	0	0	0	1 (1)	1 (1)
MF	(Hungary)	10	Zsolt Bárányos	5	0	1	0	0	0	6 (5)	0 (0)
FW	(Hungary)	11	Ádám Kovács	1	0	0	0	0	0	1 (1)	0 (0)
DF	(Hungary)	13	Zoltán Takács	1	0	0	0	0	0	1 (1)	0 (0)
DF	(Slovakia) (Hungary)	13	Dávid Radványi	1	0	0	0	0	0	1 (1)	0 (0)
FW	(Hungary)	14	Zoltán Hercegfalvi	1	0	0	0	0	0	1 (1)	0 (0)
MF	(Serbia)	14	Lazar Arsić	1	0	1	0	0	0	2 (1)	0 (0)
DF	(Hungary)	15	Máté Katona	3	0	0	0	1	0	4 (3)	0 (0)
FW	(Croatia)	17	Marko Šimić	4	0	1	0	1	0	6 (4)	0 (0)
MF	(Hungary)	18	Dávid Görgényi	3	1	0	0	0	0	3 (3)	1 (1)
MF	(Hungary)	19	Tamás Kiss	1	0	0	0	0	0	1 (1)	0 (0)
MF	(Serbia)	19	Miloš Jokić	1	0	0	0	1	0	2 (1)	0 (0)
FW	(Hungary)	21	Csaba Ferkó	2	0	0	0	0	0	2 (2)	0 (0)
DF	(Hungary)	22	Gábor Polényi	1	0	0	0	0	0	1 (1)	0 (0)
DF	(Hungary)	23	Tamás Rubus	1	1	0	0	0	0	1 (1)	1 (1)
MF	(Hungary)	24	Patrik Csoór	1	0	0	0	0	0	1 (1)	0 (0)
DF	(Hungary)	26	Marcell Matolcsi	1	0	0	0	0	0	1 (1)	0 (0)
DF	(Serbia)	33	Dušan Mileusnić	1	2	0	0	0	0	1 (1)	2 (2)
MF	(Hungary)	34	Salem Reidan	1	0	0	0	0	0	1 (1)	0 (0)
DF	(Slovakia) (Hungary)	36	Jozef Gašpar	2	0	0	0	0	0	2 (2)	0 (0)
MF	(Hungary)	41	Balázs Farkas	5	0	0	0	0	0	5 (5)	0 (0)
DF	(Hungary)	55	László Sütő	3	0	0	0	0	0	3 (3)	0 (0)
DF	(Croatia)	87	Jurica Pranjić	0	0	0	0	1	0	1 (0)	0 (0)
			TOTALS	72	5	4	0	6	0	82 (72)	5 (5)

=== Overall ===
Games played	38 (30 OTP Bank Liga, 2 Hungarian Cup and 6 Hungarian League Cup)
Games won	6 (5 OTP Bank Liga, 1 Hungarian Cup and 0 Hungarian League Cup)
Games drawn	12 (9 OTP Bank Liga, 0 Hungarian Cup and 3 Hungarian League Cup)
Games lost	20 (16 OTP Bank Liga, 1 Hungarian Cup and 3 Hungarian League Cup)
Goals scored	45
Goals conceded	72
Goal difference	-27
Yellow cards	82
Red cards	5
Worst discipline	(Croatia) Haris Mehmedagić (9 (yellow card) , 0 (red card) )
Best result	3–0 (H) v Újpest FC - OTP Bank Liga - 02-10-2011
Worst result	0–4 (A) v Budapest Honvéd FC - OTP Bank Liga - 30-07-2011
Worst result	1–5 (A) v Pécsi Mecsek FC - OTP Bank Liga - 26-11-2011
Most appearances	(Hungary) Gábor Kovács (34 appearances)
Top scorer	(Croatia) Marko Šimić (7 goal)
Points	30/114 (26.32%)

Last updated: 27 May 2012

== Nemzeti Bajnokság I ==
=== Matches ===
15 July 2011 1	Debreceni VSC	5–2	Vasas SC	Debrecen, Hajdú-Bihar County
18:00 CET (UTC+01)	Kulcsár 4'; Coulibaly 21' 47' 55'; Szakály 33' (pen.)	(Report)	Šimić 49'; Kulcsár 52'	Stadium: Stadion Oláh Gábor Út; Attendance: 4,500; Referee: (Hungary) Sándor Andó-Szabó

23 July 2011 2	Vasas SC	1–2	Pécsi Mecsek FC	Budapest, Pest County
17:30 CET (UTC+01)	Gašpar 50'	(Report)	Horváth 49'; Nagy 70'	Stadium: Stadion Rudolf Illovszky; Attendance: 2,600; Referee: (Hungary) Ádám Radványi

30 July 2011 3	Budapest Honvéd FC	4–0	Vasas SC	Budapest, Pest County
17:30 CET (UTC+01)	Kulcsár 14' (o.g.); Németh 45' 88'; Danilo 82' (pen.)	(Report)		Stadium: Bozsik Stadion; Attendance: 1,500; Referee: (Hungary) Gábor Oláh

6 August 2011 4	Vasas SC	0–0	Szombathelyi Haladás	Budapest, Pest County
17:30 CET (UTC+01)		(Report)		Stadium: Stadion Rudolf Illovszky; Attendance: 500; Referee: (Hungary) Zsolt Szabó

13 August 2011 5	Győri ETO FC	3–2	Vasas SC	Győr, Győr-Moson-Sopron County
17:30 CET (UTC+01)	Koltai 25'; Ji-Paraná 59'; Ahjupera 66'	(Report)	Kulcsár 22'; Dajić 26'	Stadium: ETO Park; Attendance: 3,000; Referee: (Hungary) Mihály Fábián

19 August 2011 6	Zalaegerszegi TE	1–1	Vasas SC	Zalaegerszeg, Zala County
18:00 CET (UTC+01)	Méyé 8' (pen.)	(Report)	Šimić 84' (pen.)	Stadium: ZTE Arena; Attendance: 2,900; Referee: (Hungary) Viktor Kassai

28 August 2011 7	Vasas SC	2–0	Ferencvárosi TC	Budapest, Pest County
18:00 CET (UTC+01)	Kovács 5'; Bárányos 69'	(Report)		Stadium: Stadion Puskás Ferenc; Attendance: 3,500; Referee: (Hungary) Szabolcs Szilasi

10 September 2011 8	Kecskeméti TE	1–1	Vasas SC	Kecskemét, Bács-Kiskun County
19:00 CET (UTC+01)	Lencse 43'	(Report)	Mehmedagić 83'	Stadium: Széktói Stadion; Attendance: 4,000; Referee: (Hungary) Zoltán J. Kovács

17 September 2011 9	Vasas SC	0–0	Videoton FC	Budapest, Pest County
15:00 CET (UTC+01)		(Report)		Stadium: Stadion Rudolf Illovszky; Attendance: 2,000; Referee: (Hungary) Péter Solymosi

24 September 2011 10	Lombard-Pápa TFC	0–0	Vasas SC	Pápa, Veszprém County
18:00 CET (UTC+01)		(Report)		Stadium: Stadion Várkerti; Attendance: 2,000; Referee: (Hungary) Ádám Németh

1 October 2011 11	Vasas SC	3–0	Újpest FC	Budapest, Pest County
17:30 CET (UTC+01)	Dajić 8'; Bárányos 31'; Beliczky 38'	(Report)		Stadium: Stadion Rudolf Illovszky; Attendance: 3,000; Referee: (Hungary) János Takács

15 October 2011 12	BFC Siófok	0–0	Vasas SC	Siófok, Somogy County
18:00 CET (UTC+01)		(Report)		Stadium: Révész Street Stadium; Attendance: 500; Referee: (Hungary) Gábor Oláh

22 October 2011 13	Vasas SC	1–0	Paksi SE	Budapest, Pest County
15:00 CET (UTC+01)	Šimić 86'	(Report)		Stadium: Stadion Rudolf Illovszky; Attendance: 2,100; Referee: (Hungary) János Takács

29 October 2011 14	Kaposvári Rákóczi FC	0–0	Vasas SC	Kaposvár, Somogy County
17:00 CET (UTC+01)		(Report)		Stadium: Stadion Kaposvár Rákóczi; Attendance: 2,500; Referee: (Hungary) Ádám Farkas

5 November 2011 15	Vasas SC	2–3	Diósgyőri VTK	Budapest, Pest County
15:00 CET (UTC+01)	Kulcsár 61'; Katona 86'	(Report)	Budovinszky 17'; Abdouraman 25'; Seydi 88'	Stadium: Stadion Rudolf Illovszky; Attendance: 4,500; Referee: (Hungary) Zoltán J. Kovács

20 November 2011 16	Vasas SC	0–0	Debreceni VSC	Budapest, Pest County
16:00 CET (UTC+01)		(Report)		Stadium: Stadion Rudolf Illovszky; Attendance: 1,500; Referee: (Hungary) Szabolcs Szilasi

26 November 2011 17	Pécsi Mecsek FC	5–1	Vasas SC	Pécs, Baranya County
16:00 CET (UTC+01)	Bajzát 12' 21' 61' 81' 83'	(Report)	Bárányos 27'	Stadium: Stadion PMFC; Attendance: 3,000; Referee: (Hungary) Sándor Andó-Szabó

2 March 2012 18	Vasas SC	1–2	Budapest Honvéd FC	Budapest, Pest County
18:00 CET (UTC+01)	Szabó 85'	(Report)	Ivancsics 28' (pen.) 37' (pen.)	Stadium: Stadion Rudolf Illovszky; Attendance: 2,000; Referee: (Hungary) János Takács

10 March 2012 19	Szombathelyi Haladás	3–0	Vasas SC	Szombathely, Vas County
16:00 CET (UTC+01)	Nagy 19'; Vujović 26' (pen.); Oross 77'	(Report)		Stadium: Rohonci Street Stadium; Attendance: 5,000; Referee: (Hungary) Balázs Berke

17 March 2012 20	Vasas SC	1–2	Győri ETO FC	Budapest, Pest County
15:00 CET (UTC+01)	Takács 58' (pen.)	(Report)	Ahjupera 19'; Dudás 66'	Stadium: Stadion Rudolf Illovszky; Attendance: 1,500; Referee: (Hungary) Ádám Farkas

24 March 2012 21	Vasas SC	3–2	Zalaegerszegi TE	Budapest, Pest County
17:00 CET (UTC+01)	Tóth 7'; Dajić 77'; Kovács 90+2'	(Report)	Jasarevic 72'; Brkić 75'	Stadium: Stadion Rudolf Illovszky; Attendance: 1,500; Referee: (Hungary) Ádám Radványi

31 March 2012 22	Ferencvárosi TC	1–0	Vasas SC	Budapest, Pest County
15:00 CET (UTC+01)	Pölöskey 45' (pen.)	(Report)		Stadium: Stadion Albert Flórián; Attendance: 5,500; Referee: (Hungary) Sándor Andó-Szabó

7 April 2012 23	Vasas SC	2–4	Kecskeméti TE	Budapest, Pest County
17:30 CET (UTC+01)	Kovács 47'; Dajić 87'	(Report)	Alempijević 5'; Lencse 7'; Pekár 43'; Tököli 73'	Stadium: Stadion Rudolf Illovszky; Attendance: 1,000; Referee: (Hungary) Zoltán Iványi

15 April 2012 24	Videoton FC	4–1	Vasas SC	Székesfehérvár, Fejér County
16:00 CET (UTC+01)	Vinícius 8'; Sándor 47'; Nikolić 54' 71'	(Report)	Ferkó 5'	Stadium: Sóstói Stadion; Attendance: 2,800; Referee: (Hungary) József Berger

21 April 2012 25	Vasas SC	1–1	Lombard-Pápa TFC	Budapest, Pest County
18:00 CET (UTC+01)	Görgényi 18'	(Report)	Farkas 29' (pen.)	Stadium: Stadion Rudolf Illovszky; Attendance: 2,500; Referee: (Hungary) Viktor Kassai

28 April 2012 26	Újpest FC	2–0	Vasas SC	Budapest, Pest County
15:00 CET (UTC+01)	Vasiljević 48' (pen.); Lipták 65'	(Report)		Stadium: Szusza Ferenc Stadium; Attendance: 3,584; Referee: (Hungary) Péter Solymosi

5 May 2012 27	Vasas SC	1–0	BFC Siófok	Budapest, Pest County
17:00 CET (UTC+01)	Nyári 71' (o.g.)	(Report)		Stadium: Stadion Rudolf Illovszky; Attendance: 1,000; Referee: (Hungary) János Takács

11 May 2012 28	Paksi SE	2–1	Vasas SC	Paks, Tolna County
18:00 CET (UTC+01)	Böde 29'; Bartha 31'	(Report)	Bárányos 26'	Stadium: Stadion PSE; Attendance: 1,381; Referee: (Hungary) Balázs Böcskei

20 May 2012 29	Vasas SC	0–1	Kaposvári Rákóczi FC	Budapest, Pest County
15:00 CET (UTC+01)		(Report)	Bebeto 79' (pen.)	Stadium: Stadion Rudolf Illovszky; Attendance: 800; Referee: (Hungary) József Berger

26 May 2012 30	Diósgyőri VTK	3–2	Vasas SC	Miskolc, Borsod-Abaúj-Zemplén County
15:00 CET (UTC+01)	Bacsa 3' 17'; Tisza 27'	(Report)	Dajić 20'; Tóth 36'	Stadium: DVTK Stadion; Attendance: 6,500; Referee: (Hungary) Sándor Andó-Szabó

=== Classification ===
Pos	Team	Pld	W	D	L	GF	GA	GD	Pts	Qualification or relegation
12	Pécs	30	8	10	12	36	50	−14	34	
13	Újpest	30	8	8	14	34	46	−12	32	
14	Pápa	30	8	6	16	26	40	−14	30	
15	Vasas (Note: Vasas were deducted 2 points due unauthorized play of Haris Mehmedagić.) (R)	30	5	9	16	29	51	−22	22	Relegation to Nemzeti Bajnokság II
16	ZTE (R)	30	1	10	19	25	65	−40	13	Relegation to Nemzeti Bajnokság II

Source: MLSZ (in Hungarian)
Rules for classification: 1st points; 2nd overall wins; 3rd goal difference; 4th goals scored
(R) Relegated

=== Results summary ===
Overall								Home						Away					
Pld	W	D	L	GF	GA	GD	Pts	W	D	L	GF	GA	GD	W	D	L	GF	GA	GD
30	5	9	16	29	51	−22	24	5	4	6	18	17	+1	0	5	10	11	34	−23

Last updated: 27 May 2012.
Source: NB1

=== Results by round ===
Round	1	2	3	4	5	6	7	8	9	10	11	12	13	14	15	16	17	18	19	20	21	22	23	24	25	26	27	28	29	30
Ground	A	H	A	H	A	A	H	A	H	A	H	A	H	A	H	H	A	H	A	H	H	A	H	A	H	A	H	A	H	A
Result	L	L	L	D	L	D	W	D	D	D	W	D	W	D	L	D	L	L	L	L	W	L	L	L	D	L	W	L	L	L
Position	15	15	16	14	15	15	13	13	13	14	12	12	11	9	9	10	12	15	15	15	15	15	15	15	15	15	15	15	15	15

Updated to match(es) played on 27 May 2012. Source: Matches
A = Away; H = Home; W = Win; D = Draw; L = Loss

== Hungarian Cup ==
21 September 2011 3	Budaörsi SC	0–2	Vasas SC	Budaörs, Pest County
15:30		(Report)	Šimić 17' (pen.) 55'	Stadium: Árok utcai pálya Attendance: 300; Referee: (Hungary) Ádám Farkas

25 October 2011 4	Békéscsaba 1912 Előre SE	3–2	Vasas SC	Békéscsaba, Békés County
17:00	Pozsár 8'; Leucuta 23'; Juhász 58'	(Report)	Dajić 33'; Mehmedagić 55'	Stadium: Stadion Kórház utcai Attendance: 1,200; Referee: (Hungary) Péter Solymosi

== League Cup ==
=== Matches ===
31 August 2011 1	Mezőkövesd-Zsóry SE	2–2	Vasas SC	Mezőkövesd, Borsod-Abaúj-Zemplén County
17:30	Lakatos 80'; Vámosi 83'	(Report)	Beliczky 45'; Boda 78'	Stadium: Mezőkövesdi Városi Stadion; Attendance: 500; Referee: (Hungary) János Takács

7 September 2011 2	Vasas SC	3–3	Debreceni VSC	Budapest, Pest County
16:00	Ferkó 27'; Beliczky 34'; Mehmedagić 67'	(Report)	Alisic 42'; Szilágyi 73'; Ludánszki 80'	Stadium: Stadion Rudolf Illovszky; Attendance: 200; Referee: (Hungary) Gábor Kovács

6 October 2011 3	Diósgyőri VTK	3–0	Vasas SC	Miskolc, Borsod-Abaúj-Zemplén County
18:00	Tisza 59'; Budovinszky 71'; George 89'	(Report)		Stadium: DVTK Stadion; Attendance: 2,500; Referee: (Hungary) Dániel Becséri

12 October 2011 4	Vasas SC	1–1	Diósgyőri VTK	Budapest, Pest County
14:00	Beliczky 12'	(Report)	Seydi 40'	Stadium: Stadion Rudolf Illovszky; Attendance: 200; Referee: (Hungary) Krisztián Pánczél

8 November 2011 5	Debreceni VSC	5–4	Vasas SC	Debrecen, Hajdú-Bihar County
18:00	Alisic 28'; Zahovaiko 33' 44'; Ferenczi 50' (pen.); Mijadinoski 71'	(Report)	Hudson-Odoi 51' 90+2'; Mészáros 63'; Máté 67' (o.g.)	Stadium: Stadion Oláh Gábor Út; Attendance: 1,300; Referee: (Hungary) Szabolcs Fenyvesi

16 November 2011 6	Vasas SC	2–4	Mezőkövesd-Zsóry SE	Budapest, Pest County
13:00	Šimić 2' 26'	(Report)	Török 8'; Lakatos 57'; Olasz 62'; Enescu 90+2' (pen.)	Stadium: Stadion Rudolf Illovszky; Attendance: 100; Referee: Eszter Urbán

=== Classification ===
Pos	Team	Pld	W	D	L	GF	GA	GD	Pts	Qualification
1	Debrecen	6	5	1	0	18	8	+10	16	Advance to knockout phase
2	Diósgyőr	6	3	1	2	12	5	+7	10	Advance to knockout phase
3	Mezőkövesd-Zsóry	6	1	1	4	7	18	−11	4	
4	Vasas	6	0	3	3	12	18	−6	3	

Rules for classification: 1) points; 2) goal difference; 3) number of goals scored.
