= 2011–12 Ligakupa =

Tournament details
- Country: Hungary

The 2011–12 Ligakupa was the fifth edition of the Hungarian League Cup, the Ligakupa.

== Group stage ==
=== Group A ===
Pos	Team	Pld	W	D	L	GF	GA	GD	Pts	Qualification	LOP	GYŐ	SZO	ZTE
1	Lombard-Pápa	6	4	1	1	16	3	+13	13	Advance to knockout phase		0–0	1–0	4–0
2	Győri ETO FC	6	2	3	1	9	8	+1	9		1–3		2–2	3–1
3	Szombathelyi Haladás	6	2	1	3	7	9	−2	7		2–0	1–2		2–1
4	Zalaegerszegi TE	6	1	1	4	6	18	−12	4		0–8	1–1	3–0	

Legend: Blue = home team win; Yellow = draw; Red = away team win.
Rules for classification: 1) points; 2) goal difference; 3) number of goals scored.

=== Group B ===
Pos	Team	Pld	W	D	L	GF	GA	GD	Pts	Qualification	KAP	PEC	SIÓ	FTC
1	Kaposvári Rákóczi FC	6	4	1	1	9	5	+4	13	Advance to knockout phase		1–0	2–0	2–2
2	Pécsi Mecsek	6	3	1	2	10	6	+4	10		1–2		1–1	2–1
3	Siófok	6	3	1	2	7	7	0	10		2–0	0–2		2–1
4	Ferencvárosi TC	6	0	1	5	6	13	−7	1		0–2	1–4	1–2	

Legend: Blue = home team win; Yellow = draw; Red = away team win.
Rules for classification: 1) points; 2) goal difference; 3) number of goals scored.

=== Group C ===
Pos	Team	Pld	W	D	L	GF	GA	GD	Pts	Qualification	VID	MTK	HON	GYI
1	Videoton	6	3	2	1	11	7	+4	11	Advance to knockout phase		0–0	2–1	4–2
2	MTK Budapest	6	3	2	1	6	5	+1	11	Advance to knockout phase	1–0		0–3	2–1
3	Budapest Honvéd	6	2	1	3	8	8	0	7		1–1	0–2		3–0
4	Gyirmót	6	1	1	4	9	11	−2	4		2–4	1–1	3–0	

Legend: Blue = home team win; Yellow = draw; Red = away team win.
Rules for classification: 1) points; 2) goal difference; 3) number of goals scored.

=== Group D ===
Pos	Team	Pld	W	D	L	GF	GA	GD	Pts	Qualification	KEC	PAK	UTE	SZL
1	Kecskemét	6	4	1	1	13	10	+3	13	Advance to knockout phase		2–1	4–3	0–0
2	Paks	6	3	1	2	24	11	+13	10	Advance to knockout phase	1–2		5–3	10–1
3	Újpest	6	3	1	2	17	15	+2	10		4–2	3–3		1–0
4	Szolnok	6	0	1	5	3	18	−15	1		1–3	0–4	1–3	

Legend: Blue = home team win; Yellow = draw; Red = away team win.
Rules for classification: 1) points; 2) goal difference; 3) number of goals scored.

=== Group E ===
Pos	Team	Pld	W	D	L	GF	GA	GD	Pts	Qualification	DEB	DIÓ	MEZ	VAS
1	Debrecen	6	5	1	0	18	8	+10	16	Advance to knockout phase		2–1	6–0	5–3
2	Diósgyőr	6	3	1	2	12	5	+7	10	Advance to knockout phase	0–1		4–0	3–0
3	Mezőkövesd-Zsóry	6	1	1	4	7	18	−11	4		0–1	1–3		2–2
4	Vasas	6	0	3	3	12	18	−6	3		3–3	1–1	2–4	

Legend: Blue = home team win; Yellow = draw; Red = away team win.
Rules for classification: 1) points; 2) goal difference; 3) number of goals scored.

== Knockout phase ==
=== Quarter-finals ===
The matches were played on 22 February and 7 March 2012.

Team 1	Agg.	Team 2	1st leg	2nd leg
Kaposvári Rákóczi	1–2	Lombard-Pápa	0–1	1–1
Diósgyőri	0–4	Videoton	0–2	0–2
Paks	1–2	Debreceni VSC	0–1	1–1
MTK Budapest	2–3	Kecskemét	2–2	0–1

=== Semi-finals ===
The matches were played on 27 and 28 March and 4 April 2012.

Team 1	Agg.	Team 2	1st leg	2nd leg
Lombard-Pápa	0–4	Videoton	0–3	0–1
Kecskemét	5–1	Debreceni VSC	4–0	1–1

=== Final ===
18 April 2012
17:30 (UTC+2)

Kecskemét	0–3	Videoton
		Sándor 38'; Gyurcsó 65'; Nikolić 90+1'

Széktói Stadion, Kecskemét
Attendance: 5,000
Referee: Tamás Bognár

== Goalscorers ==
As of 18 April 2012, there have been 237 goals (including 6 own goals) scored by 132 different players.

7 goals

- (Serbia) (Hungary) Nemanja Nikolić (Videoton)

5 goals

- (Republic of the Congo) Francis Litsingi (Kecskemét)
- (Hungary) Zsolt Gévay (Paks)
- (Hungary) Ádám Hrepka (Paks)
- (Hungary) István Ferenczi (Pápa)

4 goals

- (Netherlands) (Turkey) Adnan Alisic (Debrecen)
- (Estonia) Vjatšeslav Zahovaiko (Debrecen)
- (Hungary) Gergő Lovrencsics (Pápa)

3 goals

- (Hungary) János Ferenczi (Debrecen)
- (Hungary) Norbert Tóth (Gyirmót)
- (The Gambia) Jammeh Haruna (Kaposvár)
- (Hungary) Attila Tököli (Kecskemét)
- (Hungary) József Magasföldi (Paks)
- (Hungary) Tibor Montvai (Paks)
- (Hungary) Gábor Vayer (Paks)
- (Hungary) Dávid Barczi (Újpest)
- (Hungary) Péter Rajczi (Újpest)
- (Hungary) Gergő Beliczky (Vasas)
- (Hungary) Gábor Kovács (Zalaegerszeg)

2 goals

- (Brazil) Lucas (Debrecen)
- (Hungary) Krisztián Budovinszky (Diósgyőr)
- (Spain) José Luque (Diósgyőr)
- (Senegal) (France) L´Imam Seydi (Diósgyőr)
- (Hungary) Bálint Nyilasi (Ferencváros)
- (Hungary) Máté Kiss (Győr)
- (Hungary) Bence Serfőző (Győr)
- (Senegal) Dieng Cheikh Abass (Honvéd)
- (Hungary) Gergely Délczeg (Honvéd)
- (Hungary) Sándor Torghelle (Honvéd)
- (Hungary) Zoltán Farkas (Kaposvár)
- (Serbia) Miroslav Grumić (Kaposvár)
- (Hungary) László Lencse (Kecskemét)
- (Hungary) Attila Simon (Kecskemét)
- (Hungary) Béla Lakatos (Mezőkövesd)
- (Hungary) Patrik Tischler (MTK)
- (Serbia) (Hungary) Norbert Könyves (MTK)
- (Hungary) Zoltán Szabó (Pápa)
- (Hungary) Gábor Tóth (Pápa)
- (Latvia) Vadims Žuļevs (Pápa)
- (Hungary) Péter Bajzát (Pécs)
- (Hungary) (Nigeria) Thomas Sowunmi (Siófok)
- (Hungary) Ferenc Kalmár (Szolnok)
- (Hungary) Máté Skriba (Szombathely)
- (Hungary) Roland Ugrai (Szombathely)
- (Hungary) Balázs Balogh (Újpest)
- (Ghana) Bradley Hudson-Odoi (Vasas)
- (Croatia) Marko Šimić (Vasas)
- (Brazil) André Alves (Videoton)
- (Serbia) Milan Perić (Videoton)
- (Hungary) Sándor Torghelle (Videoton)
- (Serbia) Dušan Vasiljević (Videoton)
- (Romania) Vlad Bujor (Zalaegerszeg)

1 goals

- (France) (Algeria) Selim Bouadla (Debrecen)
- (Hungary) Balázs Farkas (Debrecen)
- (Hungary) Bence Ludánszki (Debrecen)
- (Gabon) Roguy Méyé (Debrecen)
- (North Macedonia) (Switzerland) Mirsad Mijadinoski (Debrecen)
- (Hungary) László Rezes (Debrecen)
- (Hungary) István Spitzmüller (Debrecen)
- (Hungary) Péter Szilágyi (Debrecen)
- (Bolivia) Vicente Arze (Diósgyőr)
- (Cameroon) George Menougong (Diósgyőr)
- (Hungary) Szabolcs Pál (Diósgyőr)
- (Hungary) Tibor Tisza (Diósgyőr)
- (Hungary) Viktor Vadász (Diósgyőr)
- (Hungary) László Fitos (Ferencváros)
- (Hungary) Krisztián Lisztes (Ferencváros)
- (Hungary) (Serbia) Lóránt Oláh (Ferencváros)
- (Hungary) Péter Pölöskey (Ferencváros)
- (Hungary) Szilárd Domanyik (Gyirmót)
- (Hungary) Gábriel Homonyik (Gyirmót)
- (Hungary) Bence Lannert (Gyirmót)
- (Hungary) László Varga (Gyirmót)
- (Hungary) Patrik Vass (Gyirmót)
- (Georgia (country)) Rati Aleksidze (Győr)
- (Brazil) Nicolas Ceolin (Győr)
- (Hungary) Ádám Dudás (Győr)
- (Hungary) Tibor Molnár (Győr)
- (Hungary) Dániel Völgyi (Győr)
- (Brazil) Danilo (Honvéd)
- (Hungary) Richárd Vernes (Honvéd)
- (Hungary) Károly Graszl (Kaposvár)
- (Hungary) Olivér Kovács (Kaposvár)
- (Serbia) Bojan Pavlović (Kaposvár)
- (Serbia) Aleksandar Alempijević (Kecskemét)
- (Hungary) Gábor Bori (Kecskemét)
- (Serbia) Vladan Čukić (Kecskemét)
- (Hungary) Dávid Mohl (Kecskemét)
- (Hungary) László Pekár (Kecskemét)
- (Netherlands) (Suriname) Kelvin Maynard (Kecskemét)
- (Montenegro) Vladan Savić (Kecskemét)
- (Romania) Andrei Enescu (Mezőkövesd)
- (Hungary) Dénes Olasz (Mezőkövesd)
- (Hungary) Norbert Palásthy (Mezőkövesd)
- (Hungary) Sándor Török (Mezőkövesd)
- (Hungary) Csaba Vámosi (Mezőkövesd)
- (Hungary) Norbert Csiki (MTK)
- (Hungary) Richárd Frank (MTK)
- (Hungary) Dávid Kelemen (MTK)
- (Hungary) László Bartha (Paks)
- (Hungary) Dániel Böde (Paks)
- (Hungary) Tamás Kiss (Paks)
- (Hungary) Tamás Sifter (Paks)
- (Hungary) Gábor Tamási (Paks)
- (Slovenia) Jože Benko (Pápa)
- (Serbia) (Spain) Goran Marić (Pápa)
- (Hungary) Gábor Varga (Pápa)
- (Hungary) Péter Andorka (Pécs)
- (Hungary) Gábor Demjén (Pécs)
- (Hungary) Zsolt Horváth (Pécs)
- (Hungary) Dávid Pákolicz (Pécs)
- (Montenegro) Marko Šćepanović (Pécs)
- (Hungary) Gábor Simonfalvi (Pécs)
- (Hungary) Zoltán Tóth (Pécs)
- (Montenegro) Bojan Božović (Siófok)
- (Hungary) András Fejes (Siófok)
- (Hungary) Norbert Lattenstein (Siófok)
- (Hungary) Dániel Lengyel (Siófok)
- (Hungary) Vilmos Melczer (Siófok)
- (Hungary) Krisztián Mile (Szolnok)
- (Hungary) Richárd Czafit (Szombathely)
- (Hungary) Attila Simon (Szombathely)
- (Montenegro) Goran Vujović (Szombathely)
- (Hungary) István Bognár (Újpest)
- (Hungary) Bence Lázár (Újpest)
- (Montenegro) Darko Marković (Újpest)
- (Hungary) (Algeria) Mohamed Remili (Újpest)
- (Hungary) Krisztián Simon (Újpest)
- (Hungary) Bence Szabó (Újpest)
- (Hungary) Zoltán Takács (Újpest)
- (Hungary) Szabolcs Üveges (Újpest)
- (Hungary) (Brazil) Electo Wilson (Újpest)
- (Hungary) József Boda (Vasas)
- (Hungary) Csaba Ferkó (Vasas)
- (Bosnia and Herzegovina) (Croatia) Haris Mehmedagić (Vasas)
- (Hungary) Áron Mészáros (Vasas)
- (Portugal) Evandro Brandão (Videoton)
- (Spain) Walter Fernández (Videoton)
- (Hungary) Ádám Gyurcsó (Videoton)
- (Serbia) Nikola Mitrović (Videoton)
- (Hungary) György Sándor (Videoton)
- (Hungary) Dániel Nagy (Videoton)
- (Hungary) Tamás Vaskó (Videoton)
- (Hungary) Tamás Szalai (Zalaegerszeg)

2 own goal

- (Hungary) Péter Máté (Debrecen) (playing against Diósgyőr and Vasas)

1 own goal

- (Hungary) Zsolt Antal (Ferencváros) (playing against Pécs)
- (Hungary) Bence Ludánszki (Debrecen) (playing against Paks)
- (Serbia) Dragan Vukmir (MTK) (playing against Gyirmót)
- (Spain) Héctor Sánchez (Videoton) (playing against Gyirmót)
