= 2011–12 Győri ETO FC season =

Győri ETO FC
2011–12 season
- Chairman: (Hungary) Csaba Tarsoly
- Manager: (Hungary) Aurél Csertői (until 5 March 2012) (Hungary) Attila Pintér
- NB 1: 3.
- Hungarian Cup: Quarter-final
- Hungarian League Cup: Group Stage
- Top goalscorer: League: (Estonia) Jarmo Ahjupera (9); All: (Hungary) Ádám Dudás (12)
- Highest home attendance: 10,000 v Debrecen (6 May 2012)
- Lowest home attendance: 300 v Haladás (6 September 2011); 300 v Pápa (15 November 2011)
Home colours	Away colours

The 2011–12 season will be Győri ETO FC's 68th competitive season, 52nd consecutive season in the OTP Bank Liga and 107th year in existence as a football club.

== First team squad ==
Note: Flags indicate national team as defined under FIFA eligibility rules; some limited exceptions apply. Players may hold more than one non-FIFA nationality.

No.	Pos.	Nation	Player
1	GK	SRB	Saša Stevanović
2	DF	HUN	Ákos Takács
4	DF	SRB	Lazar Stanišić
5	MF	CRO	Marko Dinjar
6	MF	HUN	Zoltán Fehér
7	MF	LTU	Linas Pilibaitis
8	MF	HUN	Ádám Dudás
9	MF	SVK	Otto Szabó
10	FW	GEO	Rati Aleksidze
11	FW	HUN	Roland Varga
12	MF	SRB	Nikola Trajković
14	MF	HUN	Máté Kiss
15	DF	HUN	Dániel Völgyi

No.	Pos.	Nation	Player
16	MF	BRA	Ji-Paraná
17	MF	HUN	Máté Pátkai
18	MF	HUN	József Windecker
19	FW	HUN	András Simon
20	GK	HUN	Gergely Nagy
21	MF	CZE	Marek Střeštík (loan from FC Zbrojovka Brno)
22	DF	CRO	Valentin Babić
23	FW	HUN	Tibor Tokody
24	MF	BIH	Đorđe Kamber
25	FW	EST	Jarmo Ahjupera
28	DF	SRB	Vladimir Đorđević
29	MF	HUN	Tamás Koltai

== Transfers ==
=== Summer ===
In: Note: Flags indicate national team as defined under FIFA eligibility rules; some limited exceptions apply. Players may hold more than one non-FIFA nationality.

No.	Pos.	Nation	Player
3	FW	BRA	Andre Lamas (from (Brazil) Palmeiras B)
8	MF	MNE	Đorđije Ćetković (loan return from (Montenegro) FK Zeta)
19	FW	HUN	András Simon (from (Netherlands) SBV Excelsior)
21	MF	CZE	Marek Střeštík (on loan from (Czech Republic) FC Zbrojovka Brno)
25	FW	EST	Jarmo Ahjupera (loan return from Újpest)
26	DF	BIH	Zoran Šupić (loan return from Lombard-Pápa TFC)
26	DF	HUN	Bence Zámbó (loan return from MTK Budapest FC)
30	GK	SVK	Péter Molnár (loan return from BFC Siófok)
––	MF	HUN	Bence Szabó (from Veszprém FC)
––	MF	HUN	Bence Meinczinger (from Veszprém FC)
––	DF	HUN	Csanád Novák (from Lombard-Pápa TFC)

Out: Note: Flags indicate national team as defined under FIFA eligibility rules; some limited exceptions apply. Players may hold more than one non-FIFA nationality.

No.	Pos.	Nation	Player
3	DF	GEO	Lasha Totadze (loan to Lombard-Pápa TFC)
8	MF	MNE	Đorđije Ćetković (unattached)
13	MF	GAB	Arsène Copa (unattached)
17	FW	GEO	Teimuraz Sharashenidze (to (Georgia (country)) Spartaki-Tskhinvali Tbilisi)
18	FW	CRO	Vedran Nikšić (to (Croatia) NK Zagreb)
19	FW	ALG	Fouad Bouguerra (loan to (Algeria) CS Constantine)
21	DF	CMR	Eugene Fomumbod (unattached)
24	GK	ROU	András Sánta (to Budapest Honvéd)
26	GK	SRB	Aleksandar Radosavljević (unattached)
26	DF	BIH	Zoran Šupić (to (Serbia) FK Novi Pazar)
30	MF	GEO	Giorgi Ganugrava (loan to Lombard-Pápa TFC)
––	DF	HUN	Szilárd Dományik (to Gyirmót SE)

=== Winter ===
In: Note: Flags indicate national team as defined under FIFA eligibility rules; some limited exceptions apply. Players may hold more than one non-FIFA nationality.

No.	Pos.	Nation	Player
3	DF	GEO	Lasha Totadze (loan return from Lombard-Pápa TFC)
11	FW	HUN	Roland Varga (from (Italy) Brescia Calcio)
17	MF	HUN	Máté Pátkai (from MTK Budapest FC)
24	MF	BIH	Đorđe Kamber (from Zalaegerszegi TE)
30	MF	GEO	Giorgi Ganugrava (loan return from Lombard-Pápa TFC)

Out: Note: Flags indicate national team as defined under FIFA eligibility rules; some limited exceptions apply. Players may hold more than one non-FIFA nationality.

No.	Pos.	Nation	Player
3	DF	GEO	Lasha Totadze (to (Georgia (country)) FC Dila Gori)
3	FW	BRA	André Lamas
11	FW	BRA	Nicolas Ceolin (on loan to Budapest Honvéd FC)
13	MF	GAB	Arsène Copa (to (Slovakia) FK DAC 1904 Dunajská Streda)
20	MF	ROU	Mihai Nicorec (on loan to Zalaegerszegi TE)
30	MF	GEO	Giorgi Ganugrava (on loan to Zalaegerszegi TE)
37	DF	HUN	Gábor Bieder (on loan to Soproni VSE)
49	MF	ROU	István Berde (to Gyirmót SE)
—	MF	CRO	Vanja Despotović (on loan to Soproni VSE)
—	GK	HUN	László Gyűrű (on loan to Soproni VSE)
—	MF	HUN	András Simon (on loan to Soproni VSE)
—	DF	HUN	Zoltán Kovács (to Vecsési FC)

- List of Hungarian football transfer summer 2011
- List of Hungarian football transfers winter 2011–12

== Statistics ==
=== Appearances and goals ===
Last updated on 27 May 2012.

No.	Pos	Nat	Player	Total		OTP Bank Liga		Hungarian Cup		League Cup	
No.	Pos	Nat	Player	Apps	Goals	Apps	Goals	Apps	Goals	Apps	Goals
1	GK	(Serbia) SRB	Saša Stevanović	30	-32	29	-31	1	-1	0	0
2	DF	(Hungary) HUN	Ákos Takács	22	1	13	1	5	0	4	0
4	DF	(Serbia) SRB	Lazar Stanišić	25	0	19	0	4	0	2	0
5	MF	(Croatia) CRO	Marko Dinjar	31	2	28	2	3	0	0	0
6	MF	(Hungary) HUN	Zoltán Fehér	21	1	18	0	3	1	0	0
7	MF	(Lithuania) LTU	Linas Pilibaitis	28	2	23	2	5	0	0	0
8	MF	(Hungary) HUN	Ádám Dudás	30	12	25	7	3	4	2	1
9	MF	(Slovakia) SVK	Otto Szabó	13	0	9	0	2	0	2	0
10	FW	(Georgia (country)) GEO	Rati Aleksidze	22	5	16	3	4	1	2	1
11	FW	(Hungary) HUN	Roland Varga	10	3	9	3	1	0	0	0
12	MF	(Serbia) SRB	Nikola Trajković	34	9	29	8	4	1	1	0
14	MF	(Hungary) HUN	Máté Kiss	11	2	5	0	2	0	4	2
15	DF	(Hungary) HUN	Dániel Völgyi	28	5	23	4	4	0	1	1
16	MF	(Brazil) BRA	Ji-Paraná	18	1	16	1	2	0	0	0
17	MF	(Hungary) HUN	Máté Pátkai	14	6	12	6	2	0	0	0
18	MF	(Hungary) HUN	József Windecker	18	2	10	0	5	2	3	0
19	FW	(Hungary) HUN	András Simon	5	0	4	0	1	0	0	0
20	GK	(Hungary) HUN	Gergely Nagy	1	0	1	0	0	0	0	0
21	MF	(Czech Republic) CZE	Marek Střeštík	18	1	10	1	2	0	6	0
22	DF	(Croatia) CRO	Valentin Babić	21	1	19	1	1	0	1	0
23	FW	(Hungary) HUN	Tibor Tokody	24	1	14	0	4	1	6	0
24	MF	(Bosnia and Herzegovina) BIH	Đorđe Kamber	13	1	12	1	1	0	0	0
25	FW	(Estonia) EST	Jarmo Ahjupera	29	10	24	9	5	1	0	0
28	DF	(Serbia) SRB	Vladimir Đorđević	24	1	22	1	1	0	1	0
29	MF	(Hungary) HUN	Tamás Koltai	33	9	26	6	5	3	2	0
Youth players
26	DF	(Hungary) HUN	Bence Zámbó	7	0	0	0	1	0	6	0
30	GK	(Slovakia) SVK	Péter Molnár	11	-17	0	0	5	-9	6	-8
31	FW	(Hungary) HUN	Szabolcs Kiss	6	1	0	0	1	1	5	0
35	MF	(Hungary) HUN	Ádám Nyitrai	5	0	0	0	1	0	4	0
36	FW	(Hungary) HUN	Bence Serfőző	3	2	0	0	0	0	3	2
38	FW	(Hungary) HUN	Tamás Varga	3	1	0	0	1	1	2	0
40	MF	(Slovakia) SVK	Viktor Miklós	4	0	0	0	0	0	4	0
41	MF	(Hungary) HUN	László Németh	2	0	0	0	0	0	2	0
42	MF	(Hungary) HUN	Olivér Paget	3	0	0	0	0	0	3	0
44	DF	(Hungary) HUN	Ádám Nagy	7	0	0	0	2	0	5	0
49	FW	(Hungary) HUN	Tibor Molnár	4	1	0	0	0	0	4	1
50	FW	(Hungary) HUN	Gergő Horváth	1	0	0	0	0	0	1	0
Players currently out on loan
11	FW	(Brazil) BRA	Nicolas Ceolin	8	2	2	0	1	1	5	1
20	MF	(Romania) ROU	Mihai Nicorec	4	1	0	0	1	1	3	0
37	DF	(Hungary) HUN	Gábor Bieder	2	0	0	0	1	0	1	0
Players no longer at the club
3	MF	(Brazil) BRA	André Lamas	1	0	0	0	0	0	1	0
43	MF	(Romania) ROU	István Berde	2	0	0	0	0	0	2	0

=== Top scorers ===
Includes all competitive matches. The list is sorted by shirt number when total goals are equal.

Last updated on 27 May 2012

Position	Nation	Number	Name	OTP Bank Liga	Hungarian Cup	League Cup	Total
1	(Hungary)	8	Ádám Dudás	7	4	1	12
2	(Estonia)	25	Jarmo Ahjupera	9	1	0	10
3	(Serbia)	12	Nikola Trajković	8	1	0	9
4	(Hungary)	29	Tamás Koltai	6	3	0	9
5	(Hungary)	17	Máté Pátkai	6	0	0	6
6	(Hungary)	15	Dániel Völgyi	4	0	1	5
7	(Georgia (country))	10	Rati Aleksidze	3	1	1	5
8	(Hungary)	11	Roland Varga	3	0	0	3
9	(Lithuania)	7	Linas Pilibaitis	2	0	0	2
10	(Croatia)	5	Marko Dinjar	2	0	0	2
11	(Hungary)	18	József Windecker	0	2	0	2
12	(Hungary)	14	Máté Kiss	0	0	2	2
13	(Hungary)	36	Bence Serfőző	0	0	2	2
14	(Brazil)	11	Nicolas Ceolin	0	1	1	2
15	(Brazil)	16	Ji-Paraná	1	0	0	1
16	(Croatia)	22	Valentin Babić	1	0	0	1
17	(Bosnia and Herzegovina)	24	Đorđe Kamber	1	0	0	1
18	(Serbia)	28	Vladimir Đorđević	1	0	0	1
19	(Czech Republic)	21	Marek Střeštík	1	0	0	1
20	(Hungary)	2	Ákos Takács	1	0	0	1
21	(Hungary)	23	Tibor Tokody	0	1	0	1
22	(Romania)	20	Mihai Nicorec	0	1	0	1
23	(Hungary)	38	Tamás Varga	0	1	0	1
24	(Hungary)	31	Szabolcs Kiss	0	1	0	1
25	(Hungary)	6	Zoltán Fehér	0	1	0	1
26	(Hungary)	49	Tibor Molnár	0	0	1	1
/	/	/	Own Goals	0	0	0	0
			TOTALS	56	18	9	83

=== Disciplinary record ===
Includes all competitive matches. Players with 1 card or more included only.

Last updated on 27 May 2012

Position	Nation	Number	Name	OTP Bank Liga		Hungarian Cup		League Cup		Total (Hu Total)	
Position	Nation	Number	Name	Booked	Sent off (straight red)	Booked	Sent off (straight red)	Booked	Sent off (straight red)	Booked	Sent off (straight red)
GK	(Serbia)	1	Saša Stevanović	1	0	0	0	0	0	1 (1)	0 (0)
DF	(Hungary)	2	Ákos Takács	3	0	0	0	1	0	4 (3)	0 (0)
MF	(Brazil)	3	André Lamas	0	0	0	0	1	0	1 (0)	0 (0)
DF	(Serbia)	4	Lazar Stanišić	5	0	0	0	0	0	5 (5)	0 (0)
MF	(Croatia)	5	Marko Dinjar	4	0	0	0	0	0	4 (4)	0 (0)
MF	(Hungary)	6	Zoltán Fehér	7	0	1	0	0	0	8 (7)	0 (0)
MF	(Lithuania)	7	Linas Pilibaitis	5	1	0	0	0	0	5 (5)	1 (1)
MF	(Hungary)	8	Ádám Dudás	3	0	0	0	0	0	3 (3)	0 (0)
MF	(Slovakia)	9	Otto Szabó	1	0	0	0	0	0	1 (1)	0 (0)
FW	(Georgia (country))	10	Rati Aleksidze	0	1	0	0	0	0	0 (0)	1 (1)
FW	(Hungary)	11	Roland Varga	1	0	0	0	0	0	1 (1)	0 (0)
MF	(Serbia)	12	Nikola Trajković	9	0	2	0	0	0	11 (9)	0 (0)
MF	(Hungary)	14	Máté Kiss	0	0	0	0	1	0	1 (0)	0 (0)
DF	(Hungary)	15	Dániel Völgyi	8	0	0	0	0	0	8 (8)	0 (0)
MF	(Brazil)	16	Ji-Paraná	3	0	0	0	0	0	3 (3)	0 (0)
MF	(Hungary)	17	Máté Pátkai	3	0	1	0	0	0	4 (3)	0 (0)
MF	(Hungary)	18	József Windecker	1	0	2	0	3	0	6 (1)	0 (0)
MF	(Romania)	20	Mihai Nicorec	0	0	1	0	0	0	1 (0)	0 (0)
MF	(Czech Republic)	21	Marek Střeštík	4	0	0	0	1	0	5 (4)	0 (0)
DF	(Croatia)	22	Valentin Babić	5	0	1	0	0	0	6 (5)	0 (0)
DF	(Hungary)	23	Tibor Tokody	1	0	0	0	0	0	1 (1)	0 (0)
MF	(Bosnia and Herzegovina)	24	Đorđe Kamber	2	0	0	0	0	0	2 (2)	0 (0)
FW	(Estonia)	25	Jarmo Ahjupera	3	0	0	0	0	0	3 (3)	0 (0)
DF	(Hungary)	26	Bence Zámbó	0	0	0	0	1	0	1 (0)	0 (0)
DF	(Serbia)	28	Vladimir Đorđević	2	1	1	0	0	0	3 (2)	1 (1)
MF	(Hungary)	29	Tamás Koltai	2	0	1	0	0	0	3 (2)	0 (0)
FW	(Hungary)	31	Szabolcs Kiss	0	0	0	0	1	0	1 (0)	0 (0)
MF	(Hungary)	35	Ádám Nyitrai	0	0	0	0	1	0	1 (0)	0 (0)
MF	(Slovakia)	40	Viktor Miklós	0	0	0	0	1	0	1 (0)	0 (0)
MF	(Hungary)	42	Olivér Paget	0	0	0	0	1	0	1 (0)	0 (0)
FW	(Hungary)	48	Tamás Varga	0	0	0	0	1	0	1 (0)	0 (0)
			TOTALS	73	3	10	0	13	0	96 (73)	3 (3)

=== Overall ===
Games played	42 (30 OTP Bank Liga, 6 Hungarian Cup and 6 Hungarian League Cup)
Games won	25 (20 OTP Bank Liga, 3 Hungarian Cup and 2 Hungarian League Cup)
Games drawn	7 (2 OTP Bank Liga, 2 Hungarian Cup and 3 Hungarian League Cup)
Games lost	10 (7 OTP Bank Liga, 2 Hungarian Cup and 1 Hungarian League Cup)
Goals scored	83
Goals conceded	49
Goal difference	+34
Yellow cards	96
Red cards	3
Worst discipline	(Serbia) Nikola Trajković (11 (yellow card) , 0 (red card) )
Best result	9–2 (A) v Jánossomorja SE - Hungarian Cup - 25-10-2011
Worst result	1–5 (A) v Videoton FC - Hungarian Cup - 25-02-2012
Most appearances	(Serbia) Nikola Trajković (34 appearances)
Top scorer	(Hungary) Ádám Dudás (12 goal)
Points	82/126 (65.08%)

Last updated: 27 May 2012

== Nemzeti Bajnokság I ==
=== Matches ===
17 July 2011 1	Budapest Honvéd FC	1–2	Győri ETO FC	Budapest, Pest County
16:00 CET (UTC+01)	Hajdú 12'	(Report)	Dudás 57'; Dinjar 79'	Stadium: Bozsik Stadion; Attendance: 1,500; Referee: (Hungary) Zoltán Iványi

23 July 2011 2	Győri ETO FC	1–0	Újpest FC	Győr, Győr-Moson-Sopron County
20:00 CET (UTC+01)	Pilibaitis 53'	(Report)		Stadium: ETO Park; Attendance: 4,000; Referee: (Hungary) Péter Solymosi

29 July 2011 3	Győri ETO FC	1–0	Szombathelyi Haladás	Győr, Győr-Moson-Sopron County
19:00 CET (UTC+01)	Dudás 5'	(Report)		Stadium: ETO Park; Attendance: 7,000; Referee: (Hungary) Viktor Kassai

6 August 2011 4	BFC Siófok	0–1	Győri ETO FC	Siófok, Somogy County
19:00 CET (UTC+01)		(Report)	Aleksidze 26'	Stadium: Révész Street Stadium; Attendance: 2,500; Referee: (Hungary) Szabolcs Szilasi

13 August 2011 5	Győri ETO FC	3–2	Vasas SC	Győr, Győr-Moson-Sopron County
17:30 CET (UTC+01)	Koltai 25'; Ji-Paraná 59'; Ahjupera 66'	(Report)	Kulcsár 22'; Dajić 26'	Stadium: ETO Park; Attendance: 3,000; Referee: (Hungary) Mihály Fábián

20 August 2011 6	Paksi SE	1–2	Győri ETO FC	Paks, Tolna County
18:00 CET (UTC+01)	Montvai 90'	(Report)	Völgyi 41'; Pilibaitis 83'	Stadium: Stadion PSE; Attendance: 2,200; Referee: (Chile) Alvaro Miquel Garcia

26 August 2011 7	Győri ETO FC	5–1	Zalaegerszegi TE	Győr, Győr-Moson-Sopron County
18:00 CET (UTC+01)	Völgyi 17' 73'; Aleksidze 34'; Babić 66'; Ahjupera 76'	(Report)	Tököli 48'	Stadium: ETO Park; Attendance: 4,000; Referee: (Hungary) Tamás Bognár

10 September 2011 8	Kaposvári Rákóczi FC	0–0	Győri ETO FC	Kaposvár, Somogy County
19:00 CET (UTC+01)		(Report)		Stadium: Stadion Kaposvár Rákóczi; Attendance: 4,500; Referee: (Hungary) Ádám Németh

18 September 2011 9	Győri ETO FC	2–0	Ferencvárosi TC	Győr, Győr-Moson-Sopron County
18:00 CET (UTC+01)	Aleksidze 16'; Trajković 23'	(Report)		Stadium: ETO Park; Attendance: 9,000; Referee: (Hungary) Tamás Bognár

15 September 2011 10	Diósgyőri VTK	2–0	Győri ETO FC	Miskolc, Borsod-Abaúj-Zemplén County
18:00 CET (UTC+01)	Luque 16' (pen.); Seydi 60'	(Report)		Stadium: DVTK Stadion; Attendance: 10,500; Referee: (Hungary) Szabolcs Szilasi

30 September 2011 11	Győri ETO FC	4–0	Kecskeméti TE	Győr, Győr-Moson-Sopron County
18:00 CET (UTC+01)	Dudás 12' (pen.) 41'; Trajković 83' 90+1'	(Report)		Stadium: ETO Park; Attendance: 4,000; Referee: (Hungary) Ádám Németh

15 October 2011 12	Debreceni VSC	2–0	Győri ETO FC	Debrecen, Hajdú-Bihar County
15:00 CET (UTC+01)	Šimac 21'; Kulcsár 55'	(Report)		Stadium: Stadion Oláh Gábor Út; Attendance: 9,500; Referee: (Hungary) Tamás Bognár

23 October 2011 13	Győri ETO FC	1–0	Videoton FC	Győr, Győr-Moson-Sopron County
16:00 CET (UTC+01)	Dudás 12'	(Report)		Stadium: ETO Park; Attendance: 5,500; Referee: (Hungary) Sándor Andó-Szabó

29 October 2011 14	Pécsi Mecsek FC	3–1	Győri ETO FC	Pécs, Baranya County
17:00 CET (UTC+01)	Bajzát 22'; Regedei 48'; Gyánó 90'	(Report)	Ahjupera 56'	Stadium: Stadion PMFC; Attendance: 3,500; Referee: (Chile) Alvaro Miquel Garcia

4 November 2011 15	Győri ETO FC	3–2	Lombard-Pápa TFC	Győr, Győr-Moson-Sopron County
18:00 CET (UTC+01)	Ahjupera 26'; Trajković 42'; Koltai 62'	(Report)	Ferenczi 66' (pen.); Lovrencsics 79'	Stadium: ETO Park; Attendance: 2,000; Referee: (Hungary) Viktor Kassai

19 November 2011 16	Győri ETO FC	1–3	Budapest Honvéd FC	Győr, Győr-Moson-Sopron County
17:30 CET (UTC+01)	Ahjupera 90+1'	(Report)	Danilo 6' 57'; Ivancsics 83'	Stadium: ETO Park; Attendance: 2,500; Referee: (Hungary) Tamás Bognár

26 November 2011 17	Újpest FC	1–3	Győri ETO FC	Budapest, Pest County
17:30 CET (UTC+01)	Kabát 86'	(Report)	Trajković 39'; Dudás 57' (pen.); Ahjupera 80'	Stadium: Szusza Ferenc Stadium; Attendance: 2,000; Referee: (Hungary) Zoltán Iványi

4 March 2012 18	Szombathelyi Haladás	1–1	Győri ETO FC	Szombathely, Vas County
18:00 CET (UTC+01)	Fehér 48' (o.g.)	(Report)	Ahjupera 12'	Stadium: Rohonci Street Stadium; Attendance: 6,000; Referee: (Hungary) Sándor Andó-Szabó

9 March 2012 19	Győri ETO FC	4–1	BFC Siófok	Győr, Győr-Moson-Sopron County
18:00 CET (UTC+01)	Pátkai 57' 72' 86'; Dinjar 83'	(Report)	Simon 90+1'	Stadium: ETO Park; Attendance: 2,500; Referee: (Hungary) Szabolcs Szilasi

17 March 2012 20	Vasas SC	1–2	Győri ETO FC	Budapest, Pest County
15:00 CET (UTC+01)	Takács 58' (pen.)	(Report)	Ahjupera 19'; Dudás 66'	Stadium: Stadion Rudolf Illovszky; Attendance: 1,500; Referee: (Hungary) Ádám Farkas

25 March 2012 21	Győri ETO FC	4–1	Paksi SE	Győr, Győr-Moson-Sopron County
18:00 CET (UTC+01)	Trajković 65'; Koltai 62' (pen.); Pátkai 67' 81'	(Report)	Magasföldi 73'	Stadium: ETO Park; Attendance: 2,200; Referee: (Hungary) József Berger

31 March 2012 22	Zalaegerszegi TE	0–2	Győri ETO FC	Zalaegerszeg, Zala County
17:30 CET (UTC+01)		(Report)	Kamber 4'; Trajković 67'	Stadium: ZTE Arena; Attendance: 2,000; Referee: (Hungary) Szabolcs Szilasi

6 April 2012 23	Győri ETO FC	2–1	Kaposvári Rákóczi FC	Győr, Győr-Moson-Sopron County
18:00 CET (UTC+01)	Pátkai 9'; Varga 25'	(Report)	Bebeto 46'	Stadium: ETO Park; Attendance: 2,500; Referee: (Hungary) Mihály Fábián

14 April 2012 24	Ferencvárosi TC	2–2	Győri ETO FC	Budapest, Pest County
17:30 CET (UTC+01)	Beliczky 21'; Busai 79'	(Report)	Trajković 15'; Đorđević 24'	Stadium: Stadion Albert Flórián; Attendance: 6,000; Referee: (Hungary) Zoltán Iványi

22 April 2012 25	Győri ETO FC	2–0	Diósgyőri VTK	Győr, Győr-Moson-Sopron County
16:45 CET (UTC+01)	Střeštík 82'; Ahjupera 88'	(Report)		Stadium: ETO Park; Attendance: 4,500; Referee: (Hungary) Ádám Farkas

29 April 2012 26	Kecskeméti TE	2–0	Győri ETO FC	Kecskemét, Bács-Kiskun County
18:00 CET (UTC+01)	Lencse 23' (pen.) 33'	(Report)		Stadium: Széktói Stadion; Attendance: 2,000; Referee: (Hungary) Ádám Németh

6 May 2012 27	Győri ETO FC	1–2	Debreceni VSC	Győr, Győr-Moson-Sopron County
18:00 CET (UTC+01)	Varga 32'	(Report)	Szakály 38'; Coulibaly 65'	Stadium: ETO Park; Attendance: 10,000; Referee: (Hungary) Tamás Bognár

13 May 2012 28	Videoton FC	2–1	Győri ETO FC	Székesfehérvár, Fejér County
16:45 CET (UTC+01)	Nikolić 47'; Sándor 90'	(Report)	Koltai 49'	Stadium: Sóstói Stadion; Attendance: 4,000; Referee: (Hungary) Sándor Andó-Szabó

18 May 2012 29	Győri ETO FC	3–0	Pécsi MFC	Győr, Győr-Moson-Sopron County
20:00 CET (UTC+01)	Takács 49'; Koltai 69' (pen.) 85'	(Report)		Stadium: ETO Park; Attendance: 2,500; Referee: (Hungary) Mihály Fábián

27 May 2012 30	Lombard-Pápa TFC	0–2	Győri ETO FC	Pápa, Veszprém County
15:30 CET (UTC+01)		(Report)	Varga 60'; Völgyi 85'	Stadium: Stadion Várkerti; Attendance: 800; Referee: (Hungary) Gábor Oláh

=== Classification ===
Pos	Team	Pld	W	D	L	GF	GA	GD	Pts	Qualification or relegation
1	Debrecen (C)	30	22	8	0	64	18	+46	74	Qualification for Champions League second qualifying round
2	Videoton	30	21	3	6	58	19	+39	66	Qualification for Europa League second qualifying round (Note: Since Debrecen won both the league and the 2011–12 Hungarian Cup competition, the second qualifying round berth transferred to the second-placed team of the league, and cup runners-up MTK (playing in the 2011–12 Nemzeti Bajnokság II) inherited the respective spot in the first qualifying round.)
3	Győr	30	20	3	7	56	31	+25	63	Ineligible for 2012–13 European competitions (Note: Győr have been suspended from participating in UEFA competitions for the first season they qualify between the 2011–12 and 2013–14 seasons in relation to club licensing violations. As a consequence, since they finish in any of the top three positions, the respective qualifying spots have been allocated to the team(s) immediately below.)
4	Honvéd	30	13	7	10	48	40	+8	46	Qualification for Europa League first qualifying round
5	Kecskemét	30	13	6	11	48	38	+10	45	

Source: MLSZ (in Hungarian)
Rules for classification: 1st points; 2nd overall wins; 3rd goal difference; 4th goals scored
(C) Champions

=== Results summary ===
Overall								Home						Away					
Pld	W	D	L	GF	GA	GD	Pts	W	D	L	GF	GA	GD	W	D	L	GF	GA	GD
30	20	3	7	56	31	+25	63	13	0	2	37	13	+24	7	3	5	19	18	+1

Last updated: 27 May 2012.
Source: NB1

=== Results by round ===
Round	1	2	3	4	5	6	7	8	9	10	11	12	13	14	15	16	17	18	19	20	21	22	23	24	25	26	27	28	29	30
Ground	A	H	H	A	H	A	H	A	H	A	H	A	H	A	H	H	A	A	H	A	H	A	H	A	H	A	H	A	H	A
Result	W	W	W	W	W	W	W	D	W	L	W	L	W	L	W	L	W	D	W	W	W	W	W	D	W	L	L	L	W	W
Position	4	3	3	3	2	2	2	2	2	2	2	2	2	2	2	2	2	2	2	2	2	2	2	2	2	2	3	3	3	3

Updated to match(es) played on 27 May 2012. Source: Matches
A = Away; H = Home; W = Win; D = Draw; L = Loss

== Hungarian Cup ==
21 September 2011 3	Videoton FC II	0–3	Győri ETO FC	Felcsút, Fejér County
15:30		(Report)	Dudás 28' 55'; Ceolin 76'	Stadium: Felcsúti Sportkomplexum; Attendance: 300; Referee: (Hungary) Szabolcs Szilasi

25 October 2011 4	Jánossomorja SE	2–9	Győri ETO FC	Jánossomorja, Győr-Moson-Sopron County
14:00	Tóth 48'; Szalka 71'	(Report)	Aleksidze 26'; Windecker 27'; Tokody 31'; Nicorec 32'; Koltai 39' 46' 68'; Varga 74'; Kiss 79'	Stadium: Városi Sporttelep; Attendance: 200; Referee: (Hungary) Tamás Berényi

=== Round of 16 ===
30 November 2011 1st leg	Diósgyőri VTK	1–1	Győri ETO FC	Miskolc, Borsod-Abaúj-Zemplén County
18:00	Lippai 34'	(Report)	Ahjupera 36'	Stadium: DVTK Stadion; Attendance: 5,500; Referee: (Hungary) Sándor Andó-Szabó

3 December 2011 2nd leg	Győri ETO FC	4–1 (5–2 agg.)	Diósgyőri VTK	Győr, Győr-Moson-Sopron County
15:00	Dudás 14' 36'; Fehér 32'; Trajković 38'	(Report)	Tisza 62'	Stadium: ETO Park; Attendance: 1,500; Referee: (Hungary) Viktor Kassai

=== Quarter-final ===
25 February 2012 1st leg	Videoton FC	5–1	Győri ETO FC	Székesfehérvár, Fejér County
16:00	Fernández 14'; Nikolić 39' (pen.); Sándor 48' (pen.); Oliveira 67'; Torghelle 90+2'	(Report)	Windecker 80'	Stadium: Sóstói Stadion; Attendance: 3,000; Referee: (Hungary) Péter Solymosi

14 March 2012 2nd leg	Győri ETO FC	0–1 (1–6 agg.)	Videoton FC	Győr, Győr-Moson-Sopron County
18:00		(Report)	Perić 11'	Stadium: ETO Park; Attendance: 500; Referee: (Hungary) Gergely Szőts

== League Cup ==
=== Group stage ===
31 August 2011 1	Lombard-Pápa TFC	0–0	Győri ETO FC	Pápa, Veszprém County
17:00		(Report)		Stadium: Stadion Várkerti; Attendance: 350; Referee: (Hungary) Zoltán J. Kovács

6 September 2011 2	Győri ETO FC	2–2	Szombathelyi Haladás	Győr, Győr-Moson-Sopron County
16:30	Dudás 31'; Molnár 74'	(Report)	Ugrai 76'; Vujović 88' (pen.)	Stadium: ETO Park; Attendance: 300; Referee: (Hungary) Dániel Becséri

5 September 2011 3	Zalaegerszegi TE	1–1	Győri ETO FC	Zalaegerszeg, Zala County
17:00	Bujor 12'	(Report)	Kiss 68'	Stadium: ZTE Arena; Attendance: 200; Referee: (Hungary) Gábor Kovács

12 September 2011 4	Győri ETO FC	3–1	Zalaegerszegi TE	Győr, Győr-Moson-Sopron County
15:00	Kiss 7'; Serfőző 52' 54'	(Report)	Szalai 90'	Stadium: ETO Park; Attendance: 300; Referee: (Hungary) Tibor Farkas

9 November 2011 5	Szombathelyi Haladás	1–2	Győri ETO FC	Szombathely, Vas County
16:30	Skriba 84'	(Report)	Aleksidze 36'; Ceolin 55'	Stadium: Rohonci Street Stadium; Attendance: 500; Referee: (Hungary) Gábor Oláh

15 November 2011 6	Győri ETO FC	1–3	Lombard-Pápa TFC	Győr, Győr-Moson-Sopron County
13:00	Völgyi 58'	(Report)	Ferenczi 17' 30' 35'	Stadium: ETO Park; Attendance: 300; Referee: (Hungary) Ádám Radványi

==== Classification ====
Pos	Team	Pld	W	D	L	GF	GA	GD	Pts	Qualification
1	Lombard-Pápa	6	4	1	1	16	3	+13	13	Advance to knockout phase
2	Győri ETO FC	6	2	3	1	9	8	+1	9	
3	Szombathelyi Haladás	6	2	1	3	7	9	−2	7	
4	Zalaegerszegi TE	6	1	1	4	6	18	−12	4	

Rules for classification: 1) points; 2) goal difference; 3) number of goals scored.

== Pre Season (Winter) ==
21 January 2012	Győri ETO FC	2–3	MFK Ružomberok (Slovakia)	Győr, Győr-Moson-Sopron County
	Dinjar; Koltai	(Report)		Stadium: ETO Park; Attendance: 300

25 January 2012	Győri ETO FC	1–1	ŠK Slovan Bratislava (Slovakia)	Győr, Győr-Moson-Sopron County
	Dudás	(Report)	Halenár	Stadium: ETO Park

28 January 2012	Budapest Honvéd FC	4–2	Győri ETO FC	Budapest, Pest County
	Ivancsics (pen.); Hadžić; Trninić	(Report)	Dudás; Simon	Stadium: Bozsik Stadion

3 February 2012	Győri ETO FC	2–2	1. FK Příbram (Czech Republic)	Belek, Turkey
	Fehér 21'; Ahjupera 52'	(Report)	Mareš 4' 49'

6 February 2012	Győri ETO FC	1–2	FC Metalist Kharkiv (Ukraine)	Belek, Turkey
	Varga 23'	(Report)	Torsiglieri 23' (pen.); Taison 31'

8 February 2012	Győri ETO FC	1–3	FC Kuban Krasnodar (Russia)	Belek, Turkey
	Dudás 12'	(Report)

11 February 2012	Győri ETO FC	1–2	FC Dacia Chişinău (Moldova)	Belek, Turkey
	Koltai 1'	(Report)

18 February 2012	Győri ETO FC	3–0	FC ViOn Zlaté Moravce (Slovakia)	Győr, Győr-Moson-Sopron County
	Trajković; Dinjar; Babić (pen.)	(Report)		Stadium: ETO Park; Attendance: 200; Referee: (Hungary) Dániel Becséri
