= 2016–17 Rákospalotai EAC season =

Rákospalota
2016–17 season
- Owner: Tamás Forgács
- Manager: Balázs Dinka
- Stadium: Budai II. László Stadion
- Nemzeti Bajnokság III: 15th (relegated)
- Magyar Kupa: Round of 32
- Top goalscorer: League: Tamás Kiss; Zsolt Kollár (8 each); All: Tamás Kiss (11)
2016 colours	2017 colours

The 2016–17 season was Rákospalotai Egyetértés Atlétikai Club's or shortly REAC's 70th competitive season, 5th consecutive season in the Nemzeti Bajnokság III and 104th year in existence as a football club. In addition to the domestic league, Rákospalota participated in this season's editions of the Magyar Kupa.

== First team squad ==
The players listed had league appearances and stayed until the end of the season.

Note: Flags indicate national team as defined under FIFA eligibility rules; some limited exceptions apply. Players may hold more than one non-FIFA nationality.

No.	Pos.	Nation	Player
1	GK	(Hungary) HUN	Dániel Tóth
4	DF	(Hungary) HUN	Dániel Kutai
5	DF	(Hungary) HUN	Bálint Balázs
6	MF	(Hungary) HUN	Balázs Lászka
7	MF	(Hungary) HUN	Norbert Fodor
7	MF	(Hungary) HUN	Krisztián Papp
8	FW	(Hungary) HUN	György Papp
9	MF	(Hungary) HUN	István Bodnár
10	MF	(Hungary) HUN	Tamás Kiss
11	N/A	(Hungary) HUN	Dávid Hornok
11	MF	(Hungary) HUN	Zsolt Pálmai
12	FW	(Hungary) HUN	Kristóf Csete
12	DF	(Hungary) HUN	Gergő Nagy

No.	Pos.	Nation	Player
13	MF	(Hungary) HUN	Gábor Borsos
13	MF	(Hungary) HUN	Dániel Kovács
14	DF	(Hungary) HUN	Zsolt Kollár
14	N/A	(Hungary) HUN	Bálint Somogyi
15	MF	(Hungary) HUN	Dániel Lőrincz
15	MF	(Hungary) HUN	Erik Pfister
16	MF	(Hungary) HUN	Bence László
17	DF	(Hungary) HUN	Dávid Pesti
18	N/A	(Hungary) HUN	Tibor Bódis
18	N/A	(Hungary) HUN	Gergő Pálinkás
18	MF	(Hungary) HUN	Dávid Pásztor
20	GK	(Hungary) HUN	Lajos Szűcs

== Transfers ==
=== Transfers in ===
Date	Pos.	No.	Player	From	Ref
21 July 2016	MF	9	(Hungary) István Bodnár	Hatvan	
21 July 2016	MF	13	(Hungary) Dániel Kovács	Jászberény	
21 July 2016	GK	1	(Hungary) Dániel Tóth	Baja	
4 August 2016	MF	7	(Hungary) Norbert Fodor	Bozsik Akadémia Nyíregyháza	
4 August 2016	DF	4	(Hungary) Dániel Kutai	Ferencváros	
4 August 2016	FW	18	(Hungary) Roland Pataki	Vasas	
4 August 2016	DF	17	(Hungary) Dávid Pesti	Budafok	
15 August 2016	GK	20	(Hungary) Lajos Szűcs	Videoton II	

=== Transfers out ===
Date	Pos.	No.	Player	To	Ref
–	N/A	18	(Hungary) Sándor Rácz	End of contract	
27 July 2016	GK	1	(Hungary) Gergő Ordasi	Budaörs	
28 July 2016	MF	17	(Hungary) Viktor Lucz	Rákosmente	
29 July 2016	DF	19	(Hungary) Tamás Illés	Balassagyarmat	
29 July 2016	N/A	19	(Hungary) Márk Imecz	Szigetszentmiklós	
29 July 2016	MF	7	(Hungary) Dániel Kasza	Cigánd	
29 July 2016	N/A	5	(Hungary) Arnold Kollár	Kelebia	
29 July 2016	GK	1	(Hungary) Gyula Kőhalmi	Balassagyarmat	
29 July 2016	N/A	16	(Hungary) Hunor Nagy	BKV Előre	
1 August 2016	FW	11	(Hungary) Richárd Csiszár	Vecsés	
1 August 2016	FW	9	(Hungary) Patrik Czimmermann	Vecsés	
1 August 2016	N/A	4	(Hungary) Sándor Krasznay	Halásztelek	
1 August 2016	DF	8	(Hungary) György Radnai	Vecsés	
11 August 2016	FW	9	(Hungary) Levente Spánitz	Iváncsa	
16 August 2016	MF	13	(Hungary) Bence Szántovszki	Testvériség	
25 August 2016	N/A	16	(Hungary) Balázs Varró	Szolnok	
25 August 2016	DF	5	(Hungary) Gábor Vass	Szolnok	
14 February 2017	FW	18	(Hungary) Roland Pataki	Ajka	

=== Loans in ===
Start date	End date	Pos.	No.	Player	From	Ref

=== Loans out ===
Start date	End date	Pos.	No.	Player	To	Ref

== Competitions ==
=== Overview ===
Competition	First match	Last match	Starting round	Final position	Record							
Competition	First match	Last match	Starting round	Final position	Pld	W	D	L	GF	GA	GD	Win %
Nemzeti Bajnokság III	6 August 2016	4 June 2017	Matchday 1	15th	34	11	7	16	42	55	−13	32.35
Magyar Kupa	21 September 2016	29 November 2016	Round of 128	Round of 32	3	2	0	1	7	3	+4	66.67
Total					37	13	7	17	49	58	−9	35.14

Source: Competitions

=== Nemzeti Bajnokság III ===
==== League table ====
Pos	Team	Pld	W	D	L	GF	GA	GD	Pts	Promotion or relegation
13	Tiszaújváros	34	12	9	13	38	40	−2	45	Possible Relegation to Megyei Bajnokság I
14	Debrecen II (R)	34	11	9	14	49	50	−1	42	Relegation to Megyei Bajnokság I
15	Rákospalota (R)	34	11	7	16	42	55	−13	40	Relegation to Megyei Bajnokság I
16	Hatvan (R)	34	10	10	14	48	50	−2	40	Relegation to Megyei Bajnokság I
17	Hajdúböszörmény (R)	34	8	5	21	33	72	−39	29	Relegation to Megyei Bajnokság I

Source: HFF
Rules for classification: 1) Points; 2) Matches won; 3) Goal difference; 4) Goals scored; 5) Head-to-head points; 6) Head-to-head goal difference; 7) Head-to-head away goals scored; 8) Fair play ranking; 9) Drawing of lots.
(R) Relegated

==== Results summary ====
Overall								Home						Away					
Pld	W	D	L	GF	GA	GD	Pts	W	D	L	GF	GA	GD	W	D	L	GF	GA	GD
34	11	7	16	42	55	−13	40	6	4	7	21	29	−8	5	3	9	21	26	−5

Source: HFF

==== Results by round ====
Round	1	2	3	4	5	6	7	8	9	10	11	12	13	14	15	16	17	18	19	20	21	22	23	24	25	26	27	28	29	30	31	32	33	34
Ground	A	H	A	H	A	H	A	H	A	H	A	A	H	A	H	A	H	H	A	H	A	H	A	H	A	H	A	H	H	A	H	A	H	A
Result	D	L	W	L	W	L	L	W	W	W	L	W	D	W	W	D	W	L	L	D	L	W	L	L	L	L	L	L	D	L	W	D	D	L
Position	11	14	8	12	11	14	14	11	9	7	7	7	8	7	6	7	5	5	6	6	7	5	7	8	11	13	13	14	14	15	15	15	15	15
Points	1	1	4	4	7	7	7	10	13	16	16	19	20	23	26	27	30	30	30	31	31	34	34	34	34	34	34	34	35	35	38	39	40	40

Source: Matches
A = Away; H = Home; W = Win; D = Draw; L = Loss

==== Score overview ====
Opposition	Home score	Away score	Aggregate score	Double
BKV Előre	1–0	2–1	3–1	Yes
Debrecen II	2–0	1–1	3–1	No
Diósgyőr II	0–2	1–2	1–4	No
ESMTK	1–1	2–2	3–3	No
Hajdúböszörmény	4–1	2–1	6–2	Yes
Hatvan	0–3	2–0	2–3	No
Jászberény	0–3	1–1	1–4	No
Kazincbarcika	2–1	1–2	3–3	No
Monor	1–2	1–2	2–4	No
MTK II	1–1	0–2	1–3	No
Nyírbátor	1–0	0–1	1–1	No
Putnok	4–1	1–2	5–3	No
Rákosmente	1–7	0–5	1–12	No
STC Salgótarján	0–3	1–2	1–5	No
Tállya	1–1	2–0	3–1	No
Tiszaújváros	1–2	0–1	1–3	No
Újpest II	1–1	4–1	5–2	No

==== Matches ====
6 August 2016 1	Jászberény	1–1	Rákospalota	Jászberény
17:30 CEST (UTC+2)	Á. Marcsek (yellow card) 19'; M. Ulvicki (yellow card) 44'; Á. Hamar 50'; Mile (yellow card) 67'	Report	Kollár 20', (yellow card) 44'	Stadium: Városi Stadion; Attendance: 300; Referee: Attila Báint

13 August 2016 2	Rákospalota	1–2	Tiszaújváros	Budapest
19:00 CEST (UTC+2)	B. Balázs (yellow card) 38'; E. Pfister (yellow card) 64'; Kiss 74'	Report	G. Viscsák 8'; M. Fabu (yellow card) 43'; D. Bussy (yellow card) 73'; F. Molnár (yellow card) 85'; T. Somogyi 90'; I. Kerekes (yellow card) 90+2'	Stadium: Budai II. László Stadion; Attendance: 200; Referee: Tamás Móri

21 August 2016 3	Újpest II	1–4	Rákospalota	Budapest
11:00 CEST (UTC+2)	S. Molnár (yellow card) 29'; K. Szűcs (yellow card) 36'; A. Fülöp 80'	Report	N. Fodor 3', 42'; Z. Kollár (yellow card) 56', (goal) 77'; D. Pásztor 68'	Stadium: Béke téri Stadion; Referee: Tamás Sipos

27 August 2016 4	Rákospalota	0–3	STC Salgótarján	Budapest
19:00 CEST (UTC+2)	Kiss (yellow card) 70'; G. Nagy (red card) 90+2'; Z. Kollár (yellow card) 90+3'	Report	Lukács (yellow card) 4', (goal) 39'; R. Csóka 45'; D. Obot (yellow card) 69'; Lakatos 90'	Stadium: Budai II. László Stadion; Attendance: 300; Referee: Attila Éreth

4 September 2016 5	BKV Előre	1–2	Rákospalota	Budapest
16:30 CEST (UTC+2)	Z. Solymos 70'; E. Ádám (yellow card) 78'; M. Girán (yellow card) 81'	Report	Z. Kollár (yellow card) 20', (goal) 45'; B. Balázs 49'	Stadium: Sport utcai Stadion; Attendance: 150; Referee: Mátyás Farkas

10 September 2016 6	Rákospalota	1–2	Monor	Budapest
18:00 CEST (UTC+2)	Z. Kollár (yellow card) 30'; Kiss 40'; I. Bodnár (yellow card) 84'	Report	Urbán 8', (yellow card) 49'; G. Villányi 28', (yellow card) 85'; Á. Kelemen (yellow card) 56'; Karacs (yellow card) 57'; T. Petrezselyem (red card) 80'; A. Bozsó (yellow card) 90+1'	Stadium: Budai II. László Stadion; Referee: Tamás Sipos

17 September 2016 7	Rákosmente	5–0	Rákospalota	Budapest
16:00 CEST (UTC+2)	N. Kokenszky 17', 69'; Dóczi (yellow card) 30'; Bárányos (yellow card) 37'; Fitos (yellow card) 57'; Sóron 62', 66'; V. Lucz 74'	Report	G. Papp (yellow card) 78'	Stadium: Riz Levente Sportcsarnok; Referee: Dávid Csontos

24 September 2016 8	Rákospalota	2–1	Kazincbarcika	Budapest
18:00 CEST (UTC+2)	Kiss 15', 55'; D. Kutai (yellow card) 39'; I. Bodnár (yellow card) 43'; D. Pásztor (red card) 84'	Report	Faggyas (yellow card) 6'; Belényesi (yellow card) 35'; A. Süttő (yellow card) 48'; M. Molnár (yellow card) 85'; A. Burics (yellow card) 90+2'	Stadium: Budai II. László Stadion; Attendance: 300; Referee: Dr Géza Jakab

1 October 2016 9	Hatvan	0–2	Rákospalota	Hatvan
15:00 CEST (UTC+2)	D. Labát (yellow card) 54'	Report	D. Kutai 69'; G. Nagy 72'	Stadium: Népkert Sporttelep; Attendance: 200; Referee: Gábor Kátai

8 October 2016 10	Rákospalota	1–0	Nyírbátor	Budapest
15:00 CEST (UTC+2)	Z. Kollár (yellow card) 38'; D. Kutai (yellow card) 46'; R. Pataki 85'	Report	Müller (yellow card) 76'; B. Benkő (yellow card) 90+2'	Stadium: Budai II. László Stadion; Attendance: 100; Referee: Tamás Móri

16 October 2016 11	Diósgyőr II	2–1	Rákospalota	Miskolc
11:00 CEST (UTC+2)	Makrai 54', 71'; Kitl (yellow card) 55'; Griffiths (yellow card) 81'	Report	D. Kutai (yellow card) 22'; B. Balázs (yellow card) 75'; I. Bodnár 90+1'	Stadium: Diósgyőri Stadion; Attendance: 75; Referee: Norbert Nagy

22 October 2016 12	Tállya	0–2	Rákospalota	Tállya
14:30 CEST (UTC+2)	T. Tarr (yellow card) 11'; D. Németh (yellow card) 20'; B. Németh (yellow card) 44'; Z. Molnár (yellow card) 68'; G. Bihari (red card) 80'; J. Ondó (yellow card) 90+1'; B. Horváth (yellow card) 90+2'	Report	B. Balázs (yellow card) 32'; I. Bodnár 58'; E. Pfister 81'; D. Pesti (yellow card) 88'	Stadium: Községi Sporttelep; Attendance: 100; Referee: Dávid Csontos

30 October 2016 13	Rákospalota	1–1	MTK II	Budapest
13:30 CET (UTC+1)	G. Papp 13'; R. Pataki (yellow card) 57'; I. Bodnár (yellow card) 63'	Report	Szatmári 21'; Széles (yellow card) 48'; Baki (yellow card) 50'; M. Szerencsi (yellow card) 62'	Stadium: Budai II. László Stadion; Referee: Árpád Jakab

5 November 2016 14	Hajdúböszörmény	1–2	Rákospalota	Hajdúböszörmény
13:30 CET (UTC+1)	N. Papp (yellow card) 56'; Jeremiás 60'	Report	E. Pfister (yellow card) 27', (goal) 29'; Z. Kollár (yellow card) 60'; I. Bodnár 64', (yellow card) 72'; B. Balázs (yellow card) 82'	Stadium: Városi Sport- és Rendezvényközpont; Attendance: 100; Referee: Dávid Csontos

12 November 2016 15	Rákospalota	2–0	Debrecen II	Budapest
13:30 CET (UTC+1)	Z. Kollár 3'; Kiss 31'; I. Bodnár (yellow card) 64'	Report	Szatmári (yellow card) 58'; Z. Nagy (yellow card) 63'; Á. Virág (yellow card) 79'	Stadium: Budai II. László Stadion; Referee: József Ducsai

20 November 2016 16	ESMTK	2–2	Rákospalota	Budapest
13:00 CET (UTC+1)	B. Markovics (yellow card) 41'; Z. Németh 60'; S. Bonica 68'; D. Túri (yellow card) 90+2'	Report	E. Pfister (yellow card) 4'; D. Tóth (yellow card) 9'; Z. Pálmai 32'; Kiss 37'; G. Borsos (red card) 67'; Lászka (yellow card) 73'; Z. Kollár (yellow card) 85'; D. Pesti (red card) 86'; D. Kutai (yellow card) 90+2'	Stadium: ESMTK Stadion; Referee: Katalin Sipos

26 November 2016 17	Rákospalota	4–1	Putnok	Budapest
13:00 CET (UTC+1)	I. Bodnár 9'; Z. Kollár 52'; D. Kutai 83'; E. Pfister 90'	Report	B. Kovács (yellow card) 13'; Csirszki (yellow card) 27'; R. Illés (yellow card) 71', (goal) 74'	Stadium: Budai II. László Stadion; Attendance: 100; Referee: Tibor Horváth

3 December 2016 18	Rákospalota	0–3	Jászberény	Budapest
13:00 CET (UTC+1)		Report	Z. Nyárasdi (yellow card) 7'; Á. Hamar 26'; Mile 30'; I. Menczeles (yellow card) 67'; K. Szanyi 80'; S. Sorecz (yellow card) 84'	Stadium: Budai II. László Stadion; Attendance: 300; Referee: Tamás Móri

18 February 2017 19	Tiszaújváros	1–0	Rákospalota	Tiszaújváros
14:00 CET (UTC+1)	M. Farkas (yellow card) 46'; P. Fodor (yellow card) 55'; B. Lukács 62'	Report	B. Balázs (yellow card) 64'	Stadium: Sportcentrum Műfüves pálya Attendance: 150; Referee: Csaba Sándor

26 February 2017 20	Rákospalota	1–1	Újpest II	Budapest
14:00 CET (UTC+1)	Z. Kollár 90'	Report	Z. Gere 32'; S. Virág (yellow card) 51'; T. Knap (yellow card) 85'	Stadium: Budai II. László Stadion; Referee: Márió Görög

4 March 2017 21	STC Salgótarján	2–1	Rákospalota	Salgótarján
14:30 CET (UTC+1)	M. Gólya (yellow card) 36'; Kerényi 39', 82'; M. Sulcz (yellow card) 56'; L. Lupták (red card) 61'	Report	Z. Kollár (yellow card) 31'; G. Nagy 52'; B. Balázs (yellow card) 83'; Lászka (yellow card) 88'	Stadium: Szojka Ferenc Stadion; Attendance: 300; Referee: Ádám Pillók

11 March 2017 22	Rákospalota	1–0	BKV Előre	Budapest
14:30 CET (UTC+1)	I. Bodnár (yellow card) 26'; Kiss (yellow card) 69'; Z. Pálmai 81', (yellow card) 90+3'; Lászka (yellow card) 86'	Report	Z. Kálmán (yellow card) 26'; G. Lanczkor (yellow card) 49'	Stadium: Budai II. László Stadion; Referee: Tibor Farkas

18 March 2017 23	Monor	2–1	Rákospalota	Monor
15:00 CET (UTC+1)	D. Balanescu 69'; Z. Schmidt 74'	Report	D. Pesti (yellow card) 63'; I. Bodnár (yellow card) 66'; B. László (yellow card) 73'; N. Fodor 89'	Stadium: Balassi Bálint utcai Stadion; Referee: József Ducsai

26 March 2017 24	Rákospalota	1–7	Rákosmente	Budapest
16:00 CEST (UTC+2)	B. László (yellow card) 27'; Z. Kollár (yellow card) 73'; Kiss 79'; Lászka (red card) 84'; G. Papp (yellow card) 90+1'	Report	N. Kokenszky 7', 52'; Bárányos 14', 48', 62'; V. Lucz (yellow card) 37'; B. Vattai 48'; C. Balaskó (yellow card) 56'; B. Törőcsik 65'; A. Kerék (yellow card) 84'	Stadium: Budai II. László Stadion; Referee: Gyöngyi Gaál

1 April 2017 25	Kazincbarcika	2–1	Rákospalota	Kazincbarcika
16:60 CEST (UTC+2)	A. Süttő (yellow card) 22'; A. Bene 38'; J. Farkas (yellow card) 42'; Belényesi 71'; P. Kovács (yellow card) 85'	Report	I. Bodnár 6', (yellow card) 44'; B. László (yellow card) 15'; D. Pesti (yellow card) 37'; Kiss (red card) 75'	Stadium: Pete András Stadion; Attendance: 200; Referee: László Mencsik

8 April 2017 26	Rákospalota	0–3	Hatvan	Budapest
16:30 CEST (UTC+2)	Lászka (yellow card) 32'; Z. Kollár (yellow card) 68'	Report	Z. Mundi 27', (yellow card) 42'; R. Szabó 32'; M. Purzsa (yellow card) 49'; M. Simon 60'; A. Bárkányi (yellow card) 80'	Stadium: Budai II. László Stadion; Attendance: 200; Referee: Attila Molnár

15 April 2017 27	Nyírbátor	1–0	Rákospalota	Nyírbátor
16:30 CEST (UTC+2)	M. Hornyák (yellow card) 38', (goal) 45'	Report	K. Papp (yellow card) 11'; Kiss (yellow card) 65'; Z. Kollár (yellow card) 78'	Stadium: Nyírbátori LSE Sporttelep; Attendance: 400; Referee: Tamás Takács

23 April 2017 28	Rákospalota	0–2	Diósgyőr II	Budapest
17:00 CEST (UTC+2)	Z. Kollár (yellow card) 27'; B. Balázs (yellow card) 38'	Report	B. Szabó 29'; Daushvili (yellow card) 39'; Bukrán (yellow card) 50'; Nono (yellow card) 52'; Kitl (yellow card) 66'; Makrai 67'	Stadium: Budai II. László Stadion; Attendance: 100; Referee: Ádám Pillók

29 April 2017 29	Rákospalota	1–1	Tállya	Budapest
17:00 CEST (UTC+2)	D. Kutai 13', (yellow card) 62'; G. Papp (yellow card) 27'; B. Balázs (yellow card) 53'; D. Kovács (yellow card) 81'; K. Papp (yellow card) 88'	Report	B. Németh (yellow card) 17'; N. Galambos (yellow card) 39'; T. Polényi (yellow card) 57'; Lippai 63'; Z. Pataki (yellow card) 70'; G. Bihari (yellow card) 87'	Stadium: Budai II. László Stadion; Attendance: 150; Referee: Tamás Móri

7 May 2017 30	MTK II	2–0	Rákospalota	Budapest
11:00 CEST (UTC+2)	Okuka 24', (red card) 74'; M. Szerencsi 39'; Vukmir (yellow card) 40'; Schäfer (yellow card) 62'	Report	D. Kovács (yellow card) 60'; D. Pásztor (red card) 74'; K. Papp (yellow card) 87'	Stadium: Sport utcai Stadion; Attendance: 32; Referee: Gergely Bana

13 May 2017 31	Rákospalota	4–1	Hajdúböszörmény	Budapest
18:00 CEST (UTC+2)	D. Kovács 5'; D. Lőrincz 46'; Z. Kollár 63'; Kiss 70'	Report	N. Papp (yellow card) 28'; S. Andorkó (yellow card) 46'; Jeremiás (yellow card) 77'; R. Lukács 85'	Stadium: Budai II. László Stadion; Referee: László Szalai

21 May 2017 32	Debrecen II	1–1	Rákospalota	Debrecen
18:00 CEST (UTC+2)	Á. Vincze 38', (red card) 90+4'; Kóródi (yellow card) 60'; Szilvási (yellow card) 83'; Á. Virág (yellow card) 88'	Report	Kiss (yellow card) 11'; D. Lőrincz 21', (yellow card) 49'; I. Bodnár (yellow card) 62'; D. Hornok (yellow card) 86'	Stadium: Oláh Gábor utcai Stadion; Referee: László Mencsik

27 May 2017 33	Rákospalota	1–1	ESMTK	Budapest
18:00 CEST (UTC+2)	D. Pesti (yellow card) 55'; D. Lőrincz (yellow card) 57', (goal) 73'	Report	B. Markovics 18'; L. Horváth (yellow card) 61'; Z. Tóbiás (yellow card) 71'	Stadium: Budai II. László Stadion; Referee: Tamás Berényi

4 June 2017 34	Putnok	2–1	Rákospalota	Múcsony
18:00 CEST (UTC+2)	Á. Zimányi 41'; Z. Icsó 55'; A. Tóth (red card) 85'; B. Katona (yellow card) 89'	Report	Z. Kollár 85'	Stadium: Sajóvölgye Sportcentrum; Attendance: 150; Referee: Csaba Sándor

=== Magyar Kupa ===
21 September 2016 Round of 128	Rákospalota	2–0	Siófok	Budapest
17:00 CEST (UTC+2)	D. Pesti (yellow card) 41'; D. Kovács 52'; Kiss 71'; R. Pataki (yellow card) 81'; B. Balázs (yellow card) 84'; G. Nagy (yellow card) 87'	Report	K. Körmendy (red card) 90'; R. Nagy (yellow card) 90+4'	Stadium: Budai II. László Stadion; Referee: Péter Antal

26 October 2016 Round of 64	Király	0–4	Rákospalota	Szombathely
13:30 CEST (UTC+2)	E. Nemes (yellow card) 67'	Report	R. Pataki 56'; Z. Kollár 60'; Kiss 69'; G. Papp 85'	Stadium: Király Sportlétesítmény; Attendance: 250; Referee: László Szalai

29 November 2016 Round of 32	Rákospalota	1–3	Mezőkövesd	Budapest
16:00 CET (UTC+1)	Kiss 12'; E. Pfister (red card) 40'; D. Pesti (yellow card) 45'	Report	Kink 8'; Szeles (yellow card) 44'; Nicorec 66'; Bačelić-Grgić 73'; Mevoungou (yellow card) 76'	Stadium: Budai II. László Stadion; Attendance: 400; Referee: Tibor II Gyarmati

== Statistics ==
=== Overall ===
Appearances (Apps) numbers are for appearances in competitive games only, including sub appearances.
Source: Competitions

No.	Player	Pos.	Nemzeti Bajnokság III				Magyar Kupa				Total			
No.	Player	Pos.	Apps	Goal	Booked	Sent off (straight red)	Apps	Goal	Booked	Sent off (straight red)	Apps	Goal	Booked	Sent off (straight red)
1	(Hungary) Dániel Tóth	GK	32		1		3				35		1	
3	(Hungary) Soma Szántovszki	FW												
4	(Hungary) Dániel Kutai	DF	32	3	5		3				35	3	5	
5	(Hungary) Bálint Balázs	DF	32	1	8		3		1		35	1	9	
6	(Hungary) Balázs Lászka	MF	24		4	1	3				27		4	1
7	(Hungary) Norbert Fodor	MF	20	3			1				21	3		
7	(Hungary) Krisztián Papp	MF	8		3		2				10		3	
8	(Hungary) György Papp	FW	29	1	3		3	1			32	2	3	
9	(Hungary) István Bodnár	MF	28	5	9		2				30	5	9	
10	(Hungary) Tamás Kiss	MF	33	8	4	1	3	3			36	11	4	1
11	(Hungary) Dávid Hornok		5		1		1				6		1	
11	(Hungary) Zsolt Pálmai	MF	20	2	1		2				22	2	1	
12	(Hungary) Kristóf Csete	FW	1								1			
12	(Hungary) Gergő Nagy	DF	32	2		1	2		1		34	2	1	1
13	(Hungary) Gábor Borsos	MF	3			1	1				4			1
13	(Hungary) Dániel Kovács	MF	23	1	2		2	1			25	2	2	
14	(Hungary) Zsolt Kollár	DF	32	8	13		3	1			35	9	13	
14	(Hungary) Bálint Somogyi		3								3			
15	(Hungary) Dániel Lőrincz	MF	9	3	2						9	3	2	
15	(Hungary) Erik Pfister	MF	23	3	3		1			1	24	3	3	1
16	(Hungary) Bence László	MF	22		3		1				23		3	
17	(Hungary) Dávid Pesti	DF	25		4	1	2		2		27		6	1
18	(Hungary) Tibor Bódis		1								1			
18	(Hungary) Roland Pataki	FW	16	1	1		2	1	1		18	2	2	
18	(Hungary) Gergő Pálinkás		1								1			
18	(Hungary) Dávid Pásztor	MF	13	1		2	2				15	1		2
20	(Hungary) Lajos Szűcs	GK	3								3			
22	(Hungary) Máté Kléner													
22	(Hungary) Ferenc Polyák													
Own goals														
Totals				42	67	7		7	5	1		49	72	8

=== Clean sheets ===
			Clean sheets		
No.	Player	Games Played	Nemzeti Bajnokság III	Magyar Kupa	Total
1	(Hungary) Dániel Tóth	35	5	2	7
20	(Hungary) Lajos Szűcs	3	0		0
Totals			5	2	7
