= Bence Szabó =

Bence Szabó may refer to:

- Bence Szabó (fencer) (born 1962), Hungarian fencer
- Bence Szabó (footballer, born 1990), Hungarian footballer
- Bence Szabó (footballer, born 1998), Hungarian footballer
