= Dániel Kovács (footballer, born July 1990) =

Hungarian footballer

Personal information
- Date of birth: 27 July 1990 (age 36)
- Place of birth: Budapest, Hungary
- Height: 1.80 m (5 ft 11 in)
- Position: Midfielder

Team information
- Current team: Balatonszárszó

Youth career
- 2003–2007: MTK
- 2007–2008: Basel
- 2008–2009: St. Gallen

Senior career*
Years	Team	Apps	(Gls)
2008–2009	St. Gallen II	17	(1)
2009–2011	APEP	18	(0)
2011–2013	Vasas	26	(1)
2011–2012	Vasas II	3	(0)
2013–2015	Kozármisleny	9	(0)
2015	Cegléd	9	(0)
2015–2016	Ajka	3	(0)
2016	Jászberény	15	(1)
2016–2018	Rákospalota	51	(6)
2018–2024	Balatonlelle	87	(5)
2024–	Balatonszárszó	3	(1)

International career
2006–2007	Hungary U-17	14	(3)
- * Club domestic league appearances and goals as of 27 October 2024

Dániel Kovács (born 27 July 1990) is a Hungarian professional footballer who plays as a midfielder for Balatonszárszó.

== Club career ==
On 16 July 2015, Kovács moved to Ajka in the Nemzeti Bajnokság II alongside 3 players.

== Career statistics ==
As of match played 27 October 2024

Appearances and goals by club, season and competition
Club	Season	League			National cup (Note: Includes Magyar Kupa)		League cup (Note: Includes Ligakupa)		Other		Total	
Club	Season	Division	Apps	Goals	Apps	Goals	Apps	Goals	Apps	Goals	Apps	Goals
APEP	2009–10	Cypriot First Division	18	0	—		—		—		18	0
Vasas	2011–12	Nemzeti Bajnokság I	6	0	—		—		—		6	0
Vasas	2012–13	Nemzeti Bajnokság II	20	1	4	0	4	0	—		28	1
Vasas	Total		26	1	4	0	4	0	—		34	1
Vasas II	2011–12	Nemzeti Bajnokság III	3	0	—		—		—		3	0
Kozármisleny	2013–14	Nemzeti Bajnokság II	9	0	—		3	0	—		12	0
Cegléd	2014–15	Nemzeti Bajnokság II	9	0	—		—		—		9	0
Ajka	2015–16	Nemzeti Bajnokság II	3	0	1	0	—		—		4	0
Jászberény	2015–16	Nemzeti Bajnokság III	15	1	—		—		—		15	1
Rákospalota	2016–17	Nemzeti Bajnokság III	23	1	2	1	—		—		25	2
Rákospalota	2017–18	Megyei Bajnokság I	28	5	—		—		7 (Note: Appearance in Magyar Kupa qualifying round, four appearances and one goal in Budapest Cup, two appearances in Megyei Bajnokság I Promotion play-offs)	1	35	6
Rákospalota	Total		51	6	2	1	—		7	1	60	8
Balatonlelle	2018–19	Megyei Bajnokság I	27	4	1	0	—		4 (Note: Two appearances in Magyar Kupa qualifying rounds, two appearances in Megyei Bajnokság I Promotion play-offs)	0	32	4
Balatonlelle	2019–20	Nemzeti Bajnokság III	15	0	1	0	—		—		16	0
Balatonlelle	2020–21	Megyei Bajnokság I	20	1	—		—		3 (Note: One appearance in Magyar Kupa qualifying round, two appearances in Megyei Bajnokság I Promotion play-offs)	0	23	1
Balatonlelle	2021–22	Megyei Bajnokság I	13	0	—		—		—		13	0
Balatonlelle	2022–23	Megyei Bajnokság I	7	0	1	0	—		—		8	0
Balatonlelle	2023–24	Megyei Bajnokság I	5	0	—		—		—		5	0
Balatonlelle	Total		87	5	3	0	—		7	0	97	5
Balatonszárszó	2024–25	Megyei Bajnokság III	3	1	—		—		0	0	3	1
Career total			224	14	10	1	7	0	14	1	255	16
