= Dávid Radványi =

Slovak footballer and agent (born 1989)

Personal information
- Date of birth: 19 September 1989 (age 37)
- Place of birth: Dunajská Streda, Czechoslovakia
- Height: 1.89 m (6 ft 2 in)
- Position: Defender

Youth career
- 2003–2008: DAC Dunajská Streda

Senior career*
Years	Team	Apps	(Gls)
2008–2011	DAC Dunajská Streda B	41	(1)
2011–2013	Vasas	3	(0)
2011–2012	Vasas II	0	(0)
2011	→ Nyíregyháza (loan)	9	(0)
2013	Veszprém	5	(1)
2013–2014	Békéscsaba	6	(0)
2014	Rákospalota	9	(2)
2014–2015	Kráľová pri Senci		(0)
2015–2016	Mosonmagyaróvár	10	(2)
2016	Tiszakécske	13	(1)
2016–2017	STC Salgótarján	14	(0)
2017	Hajdúböszörmény	4	(0)
2017–2018	Gabčíkovo		(0)
2018	Veszprém	8	(0)
2018–2019	Veľký Meder		(1)
2019–2021	PALAS Jahodná		(2)
2021	Kapuvár	4	(0)
2021	PALAS Jahodná	0	(0)
Total		126	(10)
- * Club domestic league appearances and goals

Dávid Radványi (born 19 September 1989) is a Slovak former professional footballer who played as a defender. He is now a player agent.

== Club career ==
On 27 June 2011, it was announced that Nemzeti Bajnokság I club Vasas signed a 3-year contract with Radványi after a successful trial. On the last day of the transfer window, he was loaned out to Nemzeti Bajnokság II side Nyíregyháza.

On 15 July 2013, Radványi signed with Békéscsaba in the second division. Half the season later, he was released along with Dániel Kiprich and László Mészáros.

As a free agent, Radványi moved to Rákospalota in the Nemzeti Bajnokság III on 24 February 2014. On 22 March 2014, he scored his first and winning goal for the club in a 1–0 win against Hajdúböszörmény who had the extra player advantage. On 26 April 2014, Radványi was banned for four matches after he made a grossly offensive remark about the referee after a red card in a 2–2 draw against Veresegyház.

== Player agent ==
In an interview, Radványi said that he chose to be an agent for players after realising that his skills were not sufficient for professional football, which requires dynamism and speed. He is active in Hungary.

== Personal life ==
He is the son of football manager and former player Mikuláš Radványi.

== Career statistics ==
Appearances and goals by club, season and competition
Club	Season	League			National cup (Note: Includes Magyar Kupa)		League cup (Note: Includes Ligakupa)		Other		Total	
Club	Season	Division	Apps	Goals	Apps	Goals	Apps	Goals	Apps	Goals	Apps	Goals
DAC Dunajská Streda B	2008–09	1. liga	22	0	—		—		—		22	0
DAC Dunajská Streda B	2009–10	2. liga	19	1	—		—		—		19	1
DAC Dunajská Streda B	Total		41	1	—		—		—		41	1
Vasas	2011–12	Nemzeti Bajnokság I	3	0	—		—		—		3	0
Vasas II	2011–12	Nemzeti Bajnokság III	—		1	0	—		—		1	0
Nyíregyháza (loan)	2011–12	Nemzeti Bajnokság II	9	0	—		—		—		9	0
Veszprém	2012–13	Nemzeti Bajnokság II	5	1	—		—		—		5	1
Békéscsaba	2013–14	Nemzeti Bajnokság II	6	0	2	0	4	0	—		12	0
Rákospalota	2013–14	Nemzeti Bajnokság III	9	2	—		—		—		9	2
Mosonmagyaróvár	2015–16	Nemzeti Bajnokság III	10	2	—		—		—		10	2
Tiszakécske	2015–16	Megyei Bajnokság I	13	1	—		—		4 (Note: Appearances in Bács-Kiskun County Cup)	0	17	1
STC Salgótarján	2016–17	Nemzeti Bajnokság III	14	0	—		—		—		14	0
Hajdúböszörmény	2016–17	Nemzeti Bajnokság III	4	0	—		—		—		4	0
Veszprém	2017–18	Nemzeti Bajnokság III	8	0	—		—		—		8	0
Kapuvár	2020–21	Megyei Bajnokság I	4	0	—		—		—		4	0
Career total			126	7	3	0	4	0	4	0	137	7
