= Jurica Pranjić =

Croatian footballer

Personal information
- Full name: Jurica Pranjić
- Date of birth: 16 December 1987 (age 38)
- Place of birth: Teslić, SFR Yugoslavia
- Height: 1.85 m (6 ft 1 in)
- Position: Defender

Team information
- Current team: NK Borac Bobota

Youth career
- 1999–2006: NK Osijek

Senior career*
| Years | Team | Apps | (Gls) |
| 2006–2011 | Osijek | 72 | (1) |
| 2006–2007 | → Belišće (loan) | 14 | (0) |
| 2011 | Vasas | 2 | (0) |
| 2012–2014 | Slaven Belupo | 16 | (0) |
| 2014–2015 | Osijek | 6 | (0) |
| 2015–2017 | SV Oberwart | 26 | (2) |
| 2017–2018 | Belišće | | |
| 2018–2019 | NK Zrinski Jurjevac | | |
| 2019–2021 | Olimpija Osijek | | |
| 2021 | HNK Grabovac | | |
| 2022- | NK Borac Bobota | | |

International career^{‡}
| 2004 | Croatia U18 | 1 | (0) |
| 2005–2006 | Croatia U19 | 8 | (0) |
- * Club domestic league appearances and goals as of 5 July 2017 ‡ National team caps and goals as of 20 January 2012

Jurica Pranjić (born 16 December 1987 in Teslić) is a Croatian football player, currently playing for NK Borac Bobota.

== Career ==
Pranjić started his career at Osijek, was on loan at Belišće and spent a short time in Hungary with Vasas. After being out of the game for almost the whole of 2012, he signed up with Slaven Belupo in December 2012. Pranjić returned to Osijek in June 2014, then had a stint at Austrian third level outfit SV Oberwart.
