= László Szűcs (footballer) =

Hungarian footballer

Personal information
- Full name: László Szűcs
- Date of birth: 14 March 1991 (age 35)
- Place of birth: Tatabánya, Hungary
- Height: 1.92 m (6 ft 4 in)
- Position: Centre-back

Youth career
- –2008: Ferencváros
- 2008: Borussia Dortmund
- 2008–2010: Jahn Regensburg

Senior career*
Years	Team	Apps	(Gls)
2010–2011	Jahn Regensburg	1	(0)
2011–2012	Vasas	3	(0)
2012	→ Sárisáp (loan)	11	(1)
2012–2013	Sárisáp	3	(0)
2013–2014	Tatabánya	6	(0)
2014	Dorogi FC		
2014–2018	Fortuna Regensburg		
- * Club domestic league appearances and goals

László Szűcs (born 14 March 1991) is a Hungarian former professional footballer who played as a centre-back. He made his professional debut with Jahn Regensburg in the 3. Liga on 28 August 2010 as a half-time substitute during a 3–0 home defeat to Eintracht Braunschweig.
