= Ivan Janjušević =

Montenegrin footballer

Personal information
- Date of birth: 11 July 1986 (age 40)
- Place of birth: Nikšić, Yugoslavia
- Height: 1.94 m (6 ft 4 in)
- Position: Goalkeeper

Youth career
- Sutjeska Nikšić

Senior career*
Years	Team	Apps	(Gls)
2004–2007	Sutjeska Nikšić	46	(1)
2007–2011	Mogren	76	(0)
2011–2012	Vasas	1	(0)
2012–2015	Sutjeska Nikšić	62	(0)
2016–2018	Balzan	49	(0)
2019	Lovćen	9	(0)

International career
2008	Montenegro	1	(0)
- * Club domestic league appearances and goals as of 27 May 2019

Ivan Janjušević (Cyrillic: Иван Јањушевић; born 11 July 1986) is a Montenegrin football goalkeeper.

== International career ==
Janjušević made a substitute's appearance for the Montenegro national football team in a friendly against Kazakhstan on 27 May 2008. It remained his sole international game.

== Honours ==
Mogren

- Montenegrin First League: 2008–09, 2010–11
- Montenegrin Cup: 2008

Sutjeska

- Montenegrin First League: 2012–13, 2013–14
