= Salem Reidan =

Hungarian footballer

Personal information
- Full name: Salem Reidan
- Date of birth: June 13, 1991 (age 35)
- Place of birth: Budapest, Hungary
- Position: Midfielder

Team information
- Current team: Nagytarcsa FC
- Number: 10

Youth career
- 2001–2008: III. Kerületi TUE
- 2008–2012: Vasas SC

Senior career*
Years	Team	Apps	(Gls)
2012–2013	Vasas SC	7	(0)
2013	→ Viadukt SE-Biatorbágy (loan)	6	(0)
2013–2014	Csákvár	9	(0)
2015–2016	SpVgg Renningen		
2016–2020	Vecsési FC	56	(5)
2020–2021	TFSE	15	(2)
2021–2023	MozGo Nagykőrös SE	0	(0)
2023–	Nagytarcsa FC	11	(2)
- * Club domestic league appearances and goals as of 22 September 2024

Salem Reidan (born 13 June 1991 in Budapest) is a professional Hungarian footballer who currently plays for Nagytarcsa FC.

== Career statistics ==
Appearances and goals by club, season and competition
Club	Season	League			Cup		League Cup		Europe		Total	
Club	Season	Division	Apps	Goals	Apps	Goals	Apps	Goals	Apps	Goals	Apps	Goals
Vasas	2011–12	Nemzeti Bajnokság I	1	0	0	0	2	0	0	0	3	0
Vasas	2012–13	Nemzeti Bajnokság II	6	0	1	0	4	0	0	0	11	0
Career total			7	0	1	0	6	0	0	0	14	0

Updated to games played as of 21 November 2012.
