= Kasali Yinka Casal =

English footballer (born 1987)

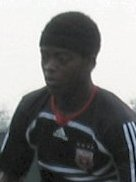
- Casal in 2007

Personal information
- Full name: Kasali Olayinka Olatunda Casal
- Date of birth: 21 October 1987 (age 39)
- Place of birth: London, England
- Positions: Left-back; left winger

Youth career
- 2003–2007: Fulham

Senior career*
Years	Team	Apps	(Gls)
2007	D.C. United	4	(0)
2007–2008	SC Cambuur	16	(0)
2008–2010	Swindon Town	5	(0)
2010	CFR Cluj	0	(0)
2010	→ Gaz Metan Mediaş (loan)	0	(0)
2011	Vasas SC	6	(0)
2012	Etar 1924	2	(0)
Total		33	(0)
- * Club domestic league appearances and goals

Kasali Olayinka Olatunde Casal (born 21 October 1987) is a former professional footballer who played as a left-back or left winger.

He is a dual citizen of the United Kingdom and Nigeria, and came through the youth academy at Premier League side Fulham. He went on to notably play in Major League Soccer for D.C. United and in the Football League for Swindon Town. He also played in Europe with SC Cambuur, CFR Cluj, Gaz Metan Mediaş, Vasas SC and Etar 1924.

He has been responsible for the football choreography in the Apple TV series Ted Lasso since 2021.

== Playing career ==
Born in London and raised in the North West area of London, Casal joined the Fulham youth academy in 2003 at the age of 16 and earned a spot on the full team reserve side two years later. Casal had been the leading scorer for Fulham's reserve team for the 2005–06 season.

In March 2007 Major League Soccer club D.C. United signed Casal to a senior contract. In July he left the club. Then he signed for Dutch side Cambuur Leeuwarden.

On 6 August 2008, Casal signed a two-year deal with Swindon Town for an undisclosed fee, after a successful trial. He made his debut for Swindon against Tranmere Rovers on the opening day of the 2008–09 season. He left Swindon by mutual consent on 12 January 2010.

On 13 January 2010, Casal signed for Romanian club CFR Cluj. He was injured in a friendly match played in Antalya and the injury was wrongly diagnosed by the medical staff. In February he went on loan to Gaz Metan Mediaş, but in early March returned to Cluj.

== Film career ==
In 2021, Casal was appointed to plan the choreography for Apple TV show Ted Lasso. Casal enlisted the help of former professional footballers Jermaine Pennant, George Elokobi, Lee Hendrie and Jay Bothroyd to play for the teams playing against the fictional AFC Richmond team managed by Jason Sudeikis' Lasso character.

== Personal life ==
In his youth he was an athlete and was on a 4x100 relay team that as of 5 September 1999 holds the British U-13 record (50.32 seconds).
