= Haris Mehmedagić =

Bosnian professional footballer

Personal information
- Full name: Haris Mehmedagić
- Date of birth: 29 March 1988 (age 38)
- Place of birth: Zagreb, SR Croatia, SFR Yugoslavia
- Height: 1.78 m (5 ft 10 in)
- Position: Centre-back

Team information
- Current team: FC Nenzing
- Number: 23

Youth career
- –2006: Zagreb

Senior career*
Years	Team	Apps	(Gls)
2006–2009	Zagreb	17	(0)
2009–2011	Lučko	48	(6)
2011–2013	Vasas	33	(1)
2013–2014	Novigrad	20	(2)
2014	Bistra	15	(1)
2015–2018	Sloboda Tuzla	75	(4)
2019	Zvijezda 09	18	(0)
2020	Stadl-Paura	1	(0)
2020–2021	DSV Leoben	8	(0)
2021–	FC Nenzing	42	(6)

International career
2005	Croatia U17	13	(1)
2006	Croatia U18	2	(0)
2007	Croatia U19	1	(0)
2009	Bosnia and Herzegovina U21	1	(0)
- * Club domestic league appearances and goals as of 27 October 2022

Haris Mehmedagić (born 29 March 1988) is a Bosnian professional footballer who plays as a centre-back for Austrian club FC Nenzing.

== Honours ==
Sloboda Tuzla

- Bosnian Premier League runner up: 2015–16
- Bosnian Cup runner up: 2015–16
