= Jarmo Ahjupera =

Estonian footballer

Personal information
- Full name: Jarmo Ahjupera
- Date of birth: 13 April 1984 (age 42)
- Place of birth: Võhma, Estonia
- Height: 1.96 m (6 ft 5 in)
- Position: Centre forward

Youth career
- Tulevik
- Flora

Senior career*
Years	Team	Apps	(Gls)
2001–2008	Flora	82	(48)
2001	→ Tervis (loan)	6	(0)
2001–2003	→ Valga (loan)	6	(0)
2003	→ Emmaste (loan)	?	(?)
2003–2004	→ Tervis (loan)	19	(8)
2005	→ Tulevik (loan)	36	(12)
2009–2013	Győri ETO	33	(13)
2011	→ Újpest (loan)	14	(8)
2013–2014	Újpest	6	(3)
2014	Nõmme Kalju	5	(3)
2015	Viljandi Tulevik	0	(0)
2017	Viljandi Tulevik	7	(1)

International career
	Estonia U-17	3	(0)
	Estonia U-19	9	(0)
2000–2005	Estonia U-21	16	(2)
2001–2013	Estonia	22	(1)
- * Club domestic league appearances and goals as of 8 December 2017

Jarmo Ahjupera (born 13 April 1984) is a retired Estonian professional footballer. He played the position of striker. After ending his professional career, he has played for various amateur teams.

== Club career ==
In 2009 February, Jarmo Ahjupera signed a 3,5-year deal with the Hungarian side Győri ETO FC. On 28 March 2009, in a League Cup match against FC Fehérvár, he suffered broken leg after a late tackle by Marko Andić.

In February 2011, he was loaned to Újpest FC, where he scored 8 goals in 15 appearances.

== International career ==
When making the debut on 4 July 2001, Ahjupera (then aged 17 years and 82 days) became the youngest debutant of Estonia. He scored his first goal on 14 November 2012 in a friendly against United Arab Emirates, putting the ball firmly into the net after receiving a long pass from midfield by Konstantin Vassiljev.

=== International goals ===
Scores and results list Estonia's goal tally first.

#	Date	Venue	Opponent	Score	Result	Competition
1.	14 November 2012	Mohammed Bin Zayed Stadium, Abu Dhabi	United Arab Emirates	1–1	1–2	Friendly

== Honours ==
=== Club ===
- FC Valga
  - Estonian Second Division: 2002
    - Runners Up: 2001
- FC Flora Tallinn
  - Estonian Top Division: 2003
    - Runners Up: 2007, 2008
  - Estonian Cup: 2008
    - Runners Up: 2003, 2006
  - Estonian SuperCup: 2003, 2004
    - Runners Up: 2006
