= Csaba Ferkó =

Hungarian footballer

Personal information
- Full name: Csaba Ferkó
- Date of birth: July 7, 1987 (age 39)
- Place of birth: Budapest, Hungary
- Height: 1.82 m (6 ft 0 in)
- Position: Midfielder

Team information
- Current team: FC St. Egyden / Stfd.
- Number: 3

Youth career
- 2002–2005: MTK
- 2005–2007: Vasas

Senior career*
Years	Team	Apps	(Gls)
2006–2007	III. Kerület	1	(0)
2007–2008	Integrál-DAC	10	(1)
2008–2009	Zalaegerszeg	1	(0)
2009	→ Zalaegerszeg II	16	(1)
2009–2011	Tatabánya	18	(3)
2011–2013	Vasas	13	(1)
2013–2014	Tatabánya	21	(6)
2014–2015	Rákosmenti		
2015–2016	Budafoki		
2016	USC Pilgersdorf		
2016–2018	ASV Pöttsching		
2018–2019	SK Raika Wiesmath		
2019–	FC St. Egyden / Stfd.	0	(0)
- * Club domestic league appearances and goals as of 1 December 2013

Csaba Ferkó (born 7 July 1987) is a professional Hungarian footballer. He currently plays for Austrian club TSU Jeging.
