= Gábor Varga (footballer) =

Hungarian footballer

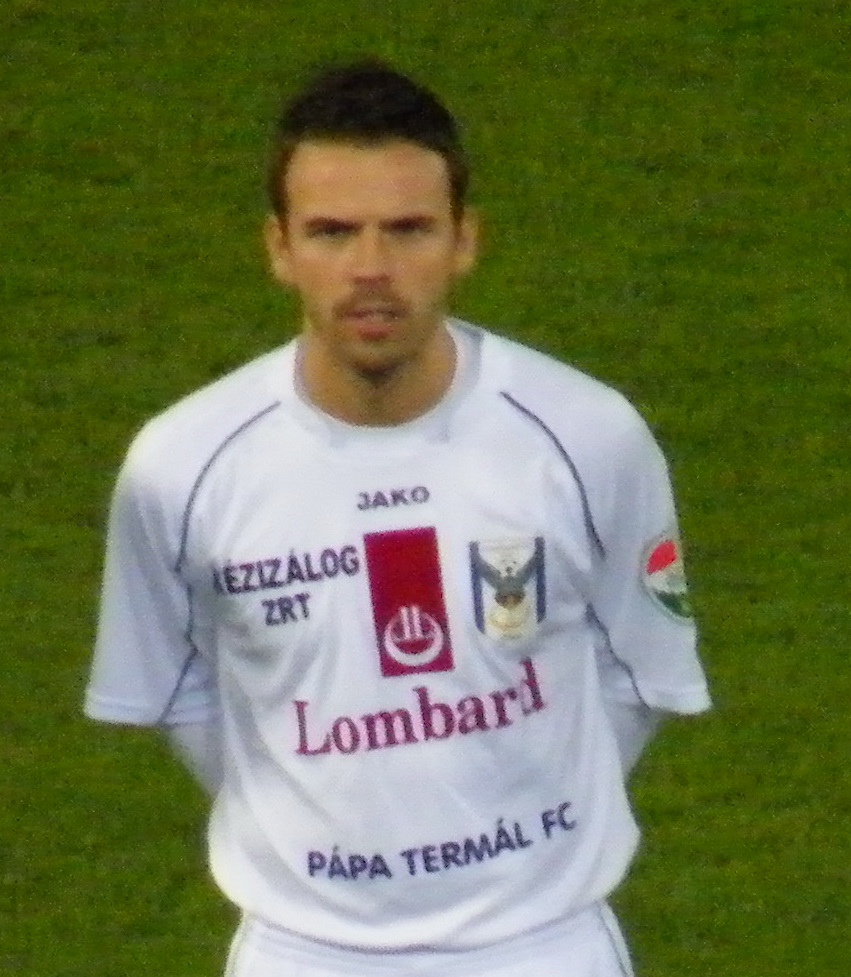

Personal information
- Full name: Gábor Varga
- Date of birth: 20 August 1985 (age 41)
- Place of birth: Csorna, Hungary
- Height: 1.78 m (5 ft 10 in)
- Position: Midfielder

Team information
- Current team: Ajka (on loan from Haladás )

Senior career*
Years	Team	Apps	(Gls)
2005–2007	Győr	15	(0)
2007–2008	Gyirmót	37	(4)
2008–2012	Pápa	55	(5)
2012	Vasas	8	(0)
2012–2014	Sopron	50	(8)
2014–	Haladás	3	(0)
2014–	→ Ajka (loan)	0	(0)

International career
2003–2004	Hungary U-19	2	(0)
- * Club domestic league appearances and goals as of 30 August 2014

Gábor Varga (born 20 August 1985 in Csorna) is a Hungarian football player who currently plays for FC Ajka on loan from Szombathelyi Haladás.
