= Béla Lakatos =

Hungarian footballer

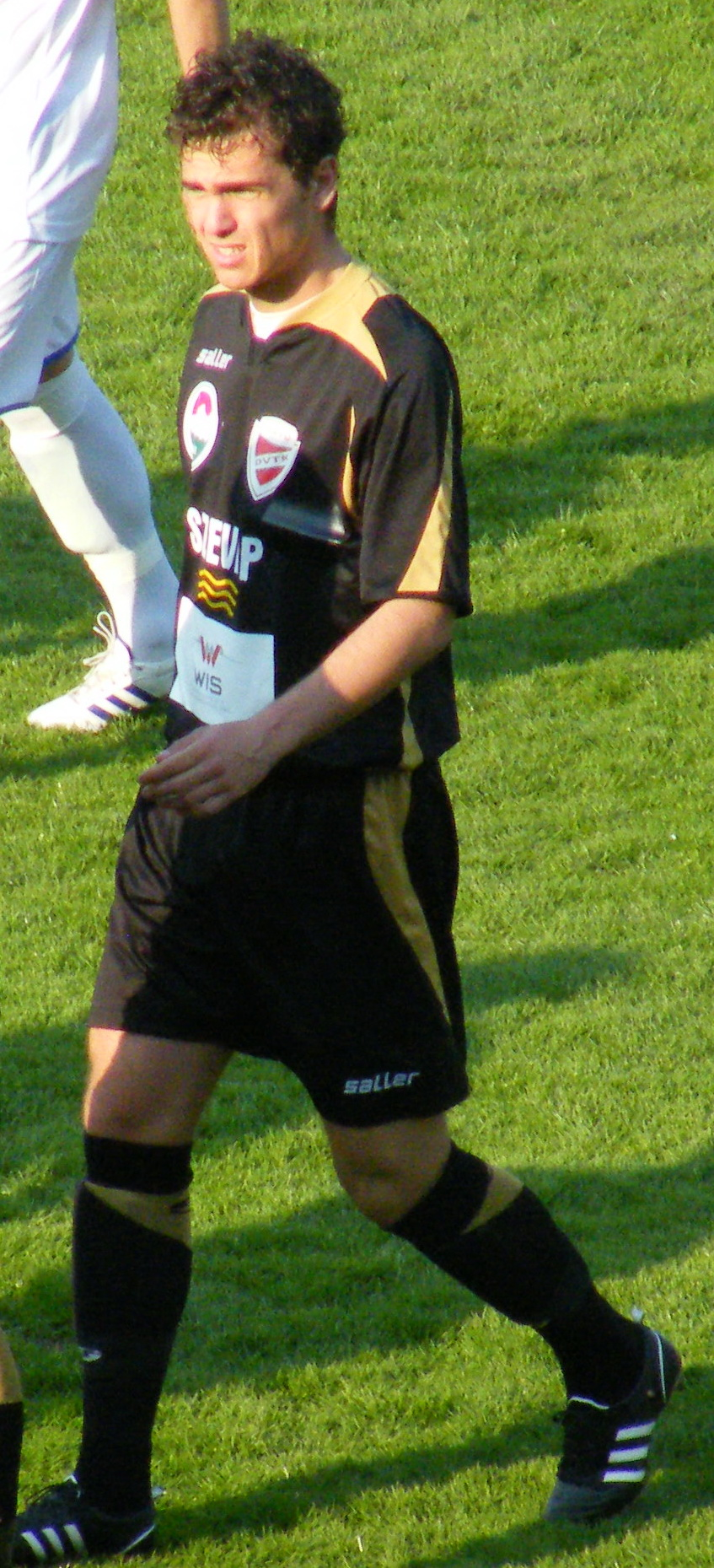

Personal information
- Date of birth: 26 September 1984 (age 42)
- Place of birth: Salgótarján, Hungary
- Height: 1.87 m (6 ft 1 1/2 in)
- Position: Midfielder

Team information
- Current team: Mezőkövesd
- Number: 18

Youth career
- 2003–2005: Salgótarján

Senior career*
Years	Team	Apps	(Gls)
2005–2007	Kaposvölgye	46	(3)
2007–2010	Diósgyőr	42	(0)
2010–	Mezőkövsd	79	(5)
- * Club domestic league appearances and goals as of 8 January 2010

Béla Lakatos (born 26 September 1984) is a former Hungarian football player who formerly played for Mezőkövesd-Zsóry SE.
