= Gergő Beliczky =

Hungarian footballer

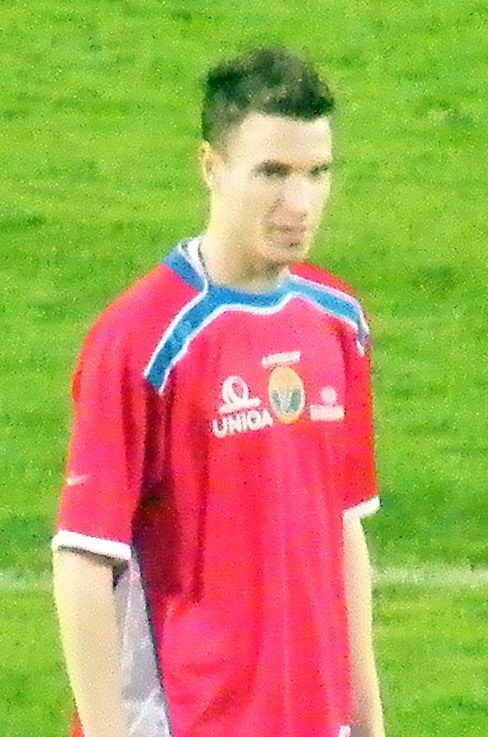
- Beliczky playing for Vasas SC

Personal information
- Date of birth: 3 July 1990 (age 36)
- Place of birth: Budapest, Hungary
- Position: Forward

Team information
- Current team: Eger

Senior career*
Years	Team	Apps	(Gls)
2008–2009	Vasas	2	(1)
2009–2010	Zwolle	15	(2)
2010–2012	Vasas	36	(5)
2012–2013	Ferencváros II	12	(4)
2012–2013	Ferencváros	15	(1)
2013–2014	Pápa	3	(0)
2013–2014	→ Gyirmót (loan)	26	(14)
2014–2016	Gyirmót	49	(8)
2016–2018	Győr	52	(14)
2018–2020	Kaposvár	49	(12)
2020	Siófok	2	(0)
2020–2021	Dorog	24	(0)
2021–2022	Tiszakécske	21	(5)
2023	Csákvár	6	(0)
2023–	Eger	1	(0)

International career
2012–2013	Hungary U21	5	(2)
- * Club domestic league appearances and goals as of 2 August 2023

Gergő Beliczky (born 3 July 1990) is a Hungarian professional footballer who plays as a forward for Eger in the third-tier Nemzeti Bajnokság III.

== Career ==
Born in Budapest, Beliczky has played in Hungary and the Netherlands for Vasas SC, Zwolle, Ferencváros and Pápa.

=== BFC Siófok ===
On 27 February 2020, Beliczky joined BFC Siófok on a contract for the rest of the season.

=== Csákvár ===
On 19 January 2023, Beliczky signed with Csákvár.
