= Bence Szabó (footballer, born 1990) =

Hungarian footballer

Personal information
- Full name: Bence Szabó
- Date of birth: January 10, 1990 (age 36)
- Place of birth: Budapest, Hungary
- Height: 1.87 m (6 ft 2 in)
- Position: Forward

Team information
- Current team: Tatabánya
- Number: 9

Youth career
- 2005–2008: Újpest

Senior career*
| Years | Team | Apps | (Gls) |
| 2008–2013 | Újpest | 1 | (0) |
| 2008–2013 | → Újpest II | 62 | (23) |
| 2009–2010 | → Wolverhampton Wanderers (loan) | 0 | (0) |
| 2010 | → Pécs (loan) | 6 | (1) |
| 2012 | → Vasas (loan) | 9 | (1) |
| 2013 | Eger | 7 | (0) |
| 2013–2014 | Tatabánya | 14 | (1) |
| 2014 | Vasas | | |
| 2014–2016 | Szigetszentmiklósi TK | | |
| 2016 | MTK Budapest | | |
| 2016–2017 | Mosonmagyaróvári TE | | |
| 2017–2018 | Voyage SE | | |
| 2018– | Unione | | |
- * Club domestic league appearances and goals as of 1 December 2013

Bence Szabó (born 10 January 1990, in Budapest) is a professional Hungarian footballer currently plays for Unione FC Budapest.
