= 2010–11 Győri ETO FC season =

Győri ETO FC
2010–11 season
- Chairman: (Hungary) Csaba Tarsoly
- Manager: (Hungary) Aurél Csertői
- NB 1: 9.
- Hungarian Cup: 5. round
- Hungarian League Cup: Quarter-final
- UEFA Europa League: Play-off round
- Top goalscorer: League: (Hungary) Tamás Koltai (3) (Brazil) Nicolas Ceolin (3) (Georgia (country)) Rati Aleksidze (3) (Algeria) Fouad Bouguerra (3); All: (Algeria) Fouad Bouguerra (6) (Brazil) Nicolas Ceolin (6)
- Highest home attendance: 8,500 vs NK Dinamo Zagreb (19 August 2010)
- Lowest home attendance: 1,000 vs Újpest FC (28 November 2010)

The 2010–11 season will be Győri ETO FC's 67th competitive season, 51st consecutive season in the Soproni Liga, and 106th year in existence as a football club.

== Team kit and logo ==
The team kits for the 2010-11 season are produced by Puma and the shirt sponsor is Quaestor. The home kit is green and white colours and the away kit is white and black colours.

Home	Away

== Transfers ==
=== Summer ===
In: Note: Flags indicate national team as defined under FIFA eligibility rules; some limited exceptions apply. Players may hold more than one non-FIFA nationality.

No.	Pos.	Nation	Player
8	MF	MNE	Đorđije Ćetković (from (Israel) Bnei Sakhnin F.C.)
11	FW	MNE	Bojan Brnović (loan return from (Hungary) Diósgyőr)
12	MF	SRB	Nikola Trajković (from (Serbia) FK Čukarički)
13	MF	HUN	Dávid Pákolicz (loan return from (Hungary) Nyírség-Sp.)
14	MF	HUN	Dániel Völgyi (loan return from (Hungary) Paksi SE)
15	FW	HUN	Bence Zámbó (loan return from (Hungary) Diósgyőr)
16	MF	BRA	Ji-Paraná (from (Brazil) SC Internacional)
19	FW	HUN	Péter Bajzát (loan return from (Hungary) Diósgyőr)
19	FW	ALG	Fouad Bouguerra (from (Hungary) Nyíregyháza)
26	DF	BIH	Zoran Šupić (loan return from (Hungary) Diósgyőr)
26	GK	SRB	Aleksandar Radosavljević (from (Serbia) FK Partizan)

Out: Note: Flags indicate national team as defined under FIFA eligibility rules; some limited exceptions apply. Players may hold more than one non-FIFA nationality.

No.	Pos.	Nation	Player
7	FW	BIH	Eldin Adilović (to (Bosnia and Herzegovina) NK Čelik Zenica)
8	MF	HUN	György Józsi (to (Hungary) Ferencvárosi TC)
11	FW	MNE	Bojan Brnović (released)
12	MF	SVK	Mário Bicák (to (Slovakia) FC Spartak Trnava)
13	MF	HUN	Dávid Pákolicz (to (Hungary) Nyíregyháza Spartacus)
14	FW	GEO	Vakhtang Pantskhava (to (Hungary) Vasas SC)
15	FW	HUN	Bence Zámbó (on loan to (Hungary) MTK Budapest FC)
16	FW	EST	Tarmo Kink (to (England) Middlesbrough FC)
19	FW	HUN	Péter Bajzát (to (Hungary) Nyíregyháza Spartacus)
21	MF	HUN	Ádám Dudás (on loan to (Hungary) Paksi SE)
26	DF	BIH	Zoran Šupić (on loan to (Hungary) Lombard-Pápa TFC)
31	GK	SVK	Péter Molnár (on loan to (Hungary) BFC Siófok)
32	DF	MAR	Chemcedine El Araichi (to (Belgium) K.V. Kortrijk)
—	DF	SRB	Bojan Neziri (to (Serbia) FK Inđija)
—	MF	GEO	Daviti Lortkiphanidze (released)

List of Hungarian football transfer summer 2010

== Club ==
=== Coaching staff ===
Position	Staff
Manager	(Hungary) Attila Pintér
Assistant managers	(Slovakia) (Hungary) Ottó Szabó
Assistant managers	(Hungary) József Farkas
Assistant managers	(Hungary) István Sándor
First team fitness coach	(Hungary) Zoltán Holanek
Goalkeeping coach	(Hungary) László Tőkés
Club doctor	(Hungary) Dr. Ferenc Zselló
Masseur	(Hungary) Barnabás Végh
Masseur	(Hungary) Tamás Szabó
Reserve team manager	(Hungary) István Klement
Youth team manager	(Hungary) Péter Tuifel
Academy manager	(Hungary) Antal Jäkl

Last updated: 8 August 2010

=== Other information ===
Owner	(Hungary) Csaba Tarsoly
Managing Director	(Hungary) Tibor Klement
Technical Director	(Hungary) Gyula Lencse
Youth policy Director	(Hungary) József Both
Youth policy Assistant Director	(Hungary) Dezső Liszkai
Head of Marketing	(Hungary) Tivadar Kovács
Head of Communications	(Hungary) Nóra Fürdős
Head of Finance	(Hungary) Gáborné Gordos
Head of stadium facilities	(Hungary) Péter Horváth
Caretaker	(Hungary) Tibor Földi
Ground (capacity and dimensions)	ETO Park (14,600 / 105x68 meters)

Updated to match played 13 July 2010

== Squads ==
=== First team squad ===
As of April 9, 2011

Note: Flags indicate national team as defined under FIFA eligibility rules; some limited exceptions apply. Players may hold more than one non-FIFA nationality.

No.	Pos.	Nation	Player
1	GK	SRB	Saša Stevanović
2	MF	ARG	Carlos Marinelli
2	DF	HUN	Ákos Takács
3	DF	GEO	Lasha Totadze
4	DF	SRB	Lazar Stanišić
5	MF	CRO	Marko Dinjar
6	MF	HUN	Zoltán Fehér
7	MF	LTU	Linas Pilibaitis
8	MF	MNE	Đorđije Ćetković
8	MF	HUN	Ádám Dudás
9	MF	SVK	Otto Szabó
10	FW	GEO	Rati Aleksidze
11	FW	BRA	Nicolas Ceolin
12	MF	SRB	Nikola Trajković
13	MF	GAB	Arsène Copa
14	MF	HUN	Máté Kiss

No.	Pos.	Nation	Player
15	DF	HUN	Dániel Völgyi
16	MF	BRA	Ji-Paraná
17	FW	GEO	Teimuraz Sharashenidze
18	FW	CRO	Vedran Nikšić
19	FW	ALG	Fouad Bouguerra
20	MF	ROU	Mihai Nicorec
21	DF	CMR	Eugene Fomumbod
22	DF	CRO	Valentin Babić
23	FW	HUN	Tibor Tokody
24	GK	ROU	András Sánta
25	MF	ARG	Juan Ignacio Briones
26	GK	SRB	Aleksandar Radosavljević
28	DF	SRB	Vladimir Đorđević
29	MF	HUN	Tamás Koltai
30	MF	GEO	Giorgi Ganugrava

=== UEFA Europa League squad ===
As of August 26, 2010

Note: Flags indicate national team as defined under FIFA eligibility rules; some limited exceptions apply. Players may hold more than one non-FIFA nationality.

No.	Pos.	Nation	Player
1	GK	SRB	Saša Stevanović
4	DF	SRB	Lazar Stanišić
5	MF	CRO	Marko Dinjar
6	MF	HUN	Zoltán Fehér
7	MF	LTU	Linas Pilibaitis
8	MF	MNE	Đorđije Ćetković
9	MF	SVK	Otto Szabó
10	FW	GEO	Rati Aleksidze
11	FW	BRA	Nicolas Ceolin
12	MF	SRB	Nikola Trajković
13	MF	GAB	Arsène Copa
14	MF	HUN	Máté Kiss

No.	Pos.	Nation	Player
15	DF	HUN	Dániel Völgyi
16	FW	EST	Tarmo Kink
16	MF	BRA	Ji-Paraná
17	FW	GEO	Teimuraz Sharashenidze
19	FW	ALG	Fouad Bouguerra
20	MF	ROU	Mihai Nicorec
22	DF	CRO	Valentin Babić
23	FW	HUN	Tibor Tokody
24	GK	ROU	András Sánta
28	DF	SRB	Vladimir Đorđević
29	MF	HUN	Tamás Koltai

== Statistics ==
=== Appearances and goals ===
Last updated on 26 April 2011.

No.	Pos	Nat	Player	Total		NB 1		Europa League		Hungarian Cup		League Cup	
No.	Pos	Nat	Player	Apps	Goals	Apps	Goals	Apps	Goals	Apps	Goals	Apps	Goals
1	GK	(Serbia) SRB	Saša Stevanović	29	-28	22	-23	6	-5	1	0	0	0
2	MF	(Argentina) ARG	Carlos Marinelli	4	0	2	0	0	0	2	0	0	0
2	DF	(Hungary) HUN	Ákos Takács	6	0	6	0	0	0	0	0	0	0
3	DF	(Georgia (country)) GEO	Lasha Totadze	3	1	3	1	0	0	0	0	0	0
4	DF	(Serbia) SRB	Lazar Stanišić	24	0	16	0	6	0	2	0	0	0
5	MF	(Croatia) CRO	Marko Dinjar	21	2	17	2	4	0	0	0	0	0
6	MF	(Hungary) HUN	Zoltán Fehér	26	0	18	0	6	0	2	0	0	0
7	MF	(Lithuania) LTU	Linas Pilibaitis	31	4	21	2	8	1	2	1	0	0
8	MF	(Montenegro) MNE	Đorđije Ćetković	7	0	5	0	2	0	0	0	0	0
8	MF	(Hungary) HUN	Ádám Dudás	5	1	5	1	0	0	0	0	0	0
9	MF	(Slovakia) SVK	Otto Szabó	19	0	10	0	8	0	1	0	0	0
10	FW	(Georgia (country)) GEO	Rati Aleksidze	30	9	21	7	8	2	1	0	0	0
11	FW	(Brazil) BRA	Nicolas Ceolin	20	6	12	3	6	1	2	2	0	0
12	MF	(Serbia) SRB	Nikola Trajković	21	2	17	2	2	0	2	0	0	0
13	MF	(Gabon) GAB	Arsène Copa	18	0	10	0	7	0	1	0	0	0
14	MF	(Hungary) HUN	Máté Kiss	14	0	13	0	1	0	0	0	0	0
15	DF	(Hungary) HUN	Dániel Völgyi	23	2	20	2	2	0	1	0	0	0
16	FW	(Estonia) EST	Tarmo Kink	4	3	0	0	4	3	0	0	0	0
16	MF	(Brazil) BRA	Ji-Paraná	15	1	13	1	1	0	1	0	0	0
17	FW	(Georgia (country)) GEO	Teimuraz Sharashenidze	8	0	6	0	2	0	0	0	0	0
18	FW	(Croatia) CRO	Vedran Nikšić	2	0	2	0	0	0	0	0	0	0
19	FW	(Algeria) ALG	Fouad Bouguerra	26	6	19	3	5	1	2	2	0	0
20	MF	(Romania) ROU	Mihai Nicorec	9	2	4	0	5	2	0	0	0	0
21	DF	(Cameroon) CMR	Eugene Fomumbod	10	0	8	0	0	0	2	0	0	0
22	DF	(Croatia) CRO	Valentin Babić	14	1	8	0	6	1	0	0	0	0
23	FW	(Hungary) HUN	Tibor Tokody	17	1	12	1	5	0	0	0	0	0
24	GK	(Romania) ROU	András Sánta	4	-6	1	-2	2	-3	1	-1	0	0
25	MF	(Argentina) ARG	Juan Ignacio Briones	2	0	1	0	0	0	1	0	0	0
26	GK	(Serbia) SRB	Aleksandar Radosavljević	3	-4	3	-4	0	0	0	0	0	0
28	DF	(Serbia) SRB	Vladimir Đorđević	26	1	17	1	8	0	1	0	0	0
29	MF	(Hungary) HUN	Tamás Koltai	33	5	24	3	8	0	1	2	0	0
30	MF	(Georgia (country)) GEO	Giorgi Ganugrava	13	1	11	1	0	0	2	0	0	0

=== Top scorers ===
Includes all competitive matches. The list is sorted by shirt number when total goals are equal.

Last updated on 26 April 2011

Position	Nation	Number	Name	Soproni Liga	UEFA Europa League	Hungarian Cup	League Cup	Total
1	(Georgia (country))	10	Rati Aleksidze	7	2	0	0	9
2	(Algeria)	19	Fouad Bouguerra	3	1	2	0	6
3	(Brazil)	11	Nicolas Ceolin	3	1	2	0	6
4	(Hungary)	29	Tamás Koltai	3	0	2	0	5
5	(Lithuania)	7	Linas Pilibaitis	2	1	1	0	4
6	(Estonia)	16	Tarmo Kink	0	3	0	0	3
7	(Romania)	20	Mihai Nicorec	0	2	0	0	2
8	(Serbia)	12	Nikola Trajković	2	0	0	0	2
9	(Croatia)	5	Marko Dinjar	2	0	0	0	2
10	(Hungary)	15	Dániel Völgyi	2	0	0	0	2
11	(Croatia)	22	Valentin Babić	0	1	0	0	1
12	(Hungary)	23	Tibor Tokody	1	0	0	0	1
13	(Georgia (country))	30	Giorgi Ganugrava	1	0	0	0	1
14	(Brazil)	16	Ji-Paraná	1	0	0	0	1
15	(Serbia)	28	Vladimir Đorđević	1	0	0	0	1
16	(Hungary)	8	Ádám Dudás	1	0	0	0	1
17	(Georgia (country))	3	Lasha Totadze	1	0	0	0	1
/	/	/	Own Goals	0	0	0	0	0
			TOTALS	30	11	7	0	48

=== Disciplinary record ===
Includes all competitive matches. Players with 1 card or more included only.

Last updated on 26 April 2011

Position	Nation	Number	Name	Soproni Liga		UEFA Europa League		Hungarian Cup		League Cup		Total (Hu Total)	
Position	Nation	Number	Name	Booked	Sent off (straight red)	Booked	Sent off (straight red)	Booked	Sent off (straight red)	Booked	Sent off (straight red)	Booked	Sent off (straight red)
GK	(Serbia)	1	Saša Stevanović	2	0	1	0	0	0	0	0	3 (2)	0 (0)
DF	(Georgia (country))	3	Lasha Totadze	2	0	0	0	0	0	0	0	2 (2)	0 (0)
DF	(Serbia)	4	Lazar Stanišić	6	1	0	1	0	0	0	0	6 (6)	2 (1)
MF	(Croatia)	5	Marko Dinjar	2	0	0	0	0	0	0	0	2 (2)	0 (0)
MF	(Hungary)	6	Zoltán Fehér	4	1	2	0	0	0	0	0	6 (4)	1 (1)
MF	(Lithuania)	7	Linas Pilibaitis	6	1	1	0	0	0	0	0	7 (6)	1 (1)
MF	(Hungary)	8	Ádám Dudás	2	0	0	0	0	0	0	0	2 (2)	0 (0)
MF	(Slovakia)	9	Otto Szabó	2	0	2	0	0	0	0	0	4 (2)	0 (0)
FW	(Georgia (country))	10	Rati Aleksidze	5	0	1	0	1	0	0	0	7 (5)	0 (0)
FW	(Brazil)	11	Nicolas Ceolin	1	0	0	0	0	0	0	0	1 (1)	0 (0)
MF	(Serbia)	12	Nikola Trajković	4	0	1	0	0	0	0	0	5 (4)	0 (0)
MF	(Gabon)	13	Arsène Copa	3	0	1	0	0	0	0	0	4 (3)	0 (0)
MF	(Hungary)	14	Máté Kiss	2	0	0	0	0	0	0	0	2 (2)	0 (0)
DF	(Hungary)	15	Dániel Völgyi	10	0	1	0	0	0	0	0	11 (10)	0 (0)
FW	(Estonia)	16	Tarmo Kink	0	0	1	0	0	0	0	0	1 (0)	0 (0)
MF	(Brazil)	16	Ji-Paraná	2	0	0	0	0	0	0	0	2 (2)	0 (0)
FW	(Georgia (country))	17	T. Sharashenidze	1	0	0	0	0	0	0	0	1 (1)	0 (0)
FW	(Algeria)	19	Fouad Bouguerra	2	0	1	0	0	0	0	0	3 (2)	0 (0)
MF	(Romania)	20	Mihai Nicorec	1	0	2	0	0	0	0	0	3 (1)	0 (0)
DF	(Cameroon)	21	Eugene Fomumbod	2	1	0	0	1	0	0	0	3 (2)	1 (1)
DF	(Croatia)	22	Valentin Babić	1	0	3	0	0	0	0	0	4 (1)	0 (0)
FW	(Hungary)	23	Tibor Tokody	2	0	1	0	0	0	0	0	3 (2)	0 (0)
DF	(Serbia)	28	Vladimir Đorđević	4	1	1	0	0	0	0	0	5 (4)	1 (1)
MF	(Hungary)	29	Tamás Koltai	1	0	0	0	0	0	0	0	1 (1)	0 (0)
MF	(Georgia (country))	30	Giorgi Ganugrava	3	0	0	0	2	0	0	0	5 (3)	0 (0)
			TOTALS	70	5	19	1	4	0	0	0	93 (70)	6 (5)

=== Overall ===
Games played	35 (25 Soproni Liga, 8 UEFA Europa League, 2 Hungarian Cup and 0 Hungarian League Cup)
Games won	13 (8 Soproni Liga, 4 UEFA Europa League, 1 Hungarian Cup and 0 Hungarian League Cup)
Games drawn	11 (8 Soproni Liga, 2 UEFA Europa League, 1 Hungarian Cup and 0 Hungarian League Cup)
Games lost	11 (8 Soproni Liga, 3 UEFA Europa League, 0 Hungarian Cup and 0 Hungarian League Cup)
Goals scored	48
Goals conceded	37
Goal difference	+11
Yellow cards	93
Red cards	6
Worst discipline	(Hungary) Dániel Völgyi (11 (yellow card) , 0 (red card) )
Best result	5–1 (A) v Barcsi SC - Magyar Kupa - 26-10-2010
Worst result	0–3 (A) v Ferencvárosi TC - Nemzeti Bajnokság I - 01-09-2010
Worst result	0–3 (A) v Kaposvári Rákóczi FC - Nemzeti Bajnokság I - 19-11-2010
Most appearances	(Hungary) Tamás Koltai (33 appearances)
Top scorer	(Georgia (country)) Rati Aleksidze (9 goals)
Points	50/105 (47.62%)

Last updated: 26 April 2011

== Nemzeti Bajnokság I ==
=== Classification ===
Pos	Team	Pld	W	D	L	GF	GA	GD	Pts
7	Kaposvár	30	13	4	13	41	42	−1	43
8	Haladás	30	11	8	11	42	36	+6	41
9	Győr	30	10	11	9	40	35	+5	41
10	Honvéd	30	11	7	12	36	39	−3	40
11	Vasas	30	11	7	12	34	46	−12	40

Source: soccerway.com
Rules for classification: 1st points; 2nd overall wins; 3rd goal difference; 4th goals scored

=== Results summary ===
Overall								Home						Away					
Pld	W	D	L	GF	GA	GD	Pts	W	D	L	GF	GA	GD	W	D	L	GF	GA	GD
30	10	11	9	40	35	+5	41	8	4	3	23	12	+11	2	7	6	17	23	−6

Last updated: 22 May 2011.
Source: NB1

=== Results by round ===
Round	1	2	3	4	5	6	7	8	9	10	11	12	13	14	15	16	17	18	19	20	21	22	23	24	25	26	27	28	29	30
Ground	A	H	A	H	A	H	A	H	A	H	A	H	A	H	A	H	A	H	A	H	A	H	A	H	A	H	A	H	A	H
Result	D	W	L	D	L	W	W	L	D	L	L	W	D	D	L	W	W	L	D	W	D	W	D	D	L	D	D	W	L	W
Position	10	5	10	11	12	11	7	8	11	13	13	11	11	11	12	11	8	10	10	9	9	8	8	8	12	12	11	9	10	9

Updated to match(es) played on 22 May 2011. Source: Matches
A = Away; H = Home; W = Win; D = Draw; L = Loss

=== Matches ===
1 August 2010
20:00 CEST

Újpest FC	0 – 0 (0 – 0)	Győri ETO FC
Tajthy (yellow card) 85'	(Report)	Stanišić (yellow card) 63'; Nicorec (yellow card) 72'; Trajković (yellow card) 80'

Szusza Ferenc Stadium, Budapest
Attendance: 4,725
Referee: Viktor Kassai
- Újpest FC: Balajcza – Szokol, Vermes, Takács, Pollák (Kiss 78.) – Simek, Egerszegi (Tajthy 58.), Tisza, Mitrovic, Simon – Sitku (Böőr 81.). Coach: Géza Mészöly.
- Győri ETO FC: Stevanovic – Babic, Djordjevic, Stanisic, Szabó – Tokody (Ceolin 70.), Dinjar (Trajkovic 72.), Pilibaitis, Koltai (Cetkovic 61.) – Aleksidze, Nicorec. Coach: Attila Pintér.
- G.: —
- Y.: Tajthy (85.) – Stanisic (63.), Nicorec (72.), Trajkovic (80.)

8 August 2010
20:00 CEST

Győri ETO FC	1 – 0 (0 – 0)	BFC Siófok
Sharashenidze (yellow card) 55'; Aleksidze 68'; Stevanović (yellow card) 76'; Tokody (yellow card) 89'	(Report)	Mogyorósi (yellow card) 62' (yellow-red card) 67'; Piller (red card) 76'

ETO Park, Győr
Attendance: 3,000
Referee: Gábor Oláh
- Győri ETO FC: Stevanovic – Fehér, Djordjevic, Stanisic, Völgyi – Tokody, Pilibaitis, Dinjar (Cetkovic 61.), Koltai (Sharashenidze 46.) – Nicorec (Aleksidze 56.), Bouguerra. Coach: Attila Pintér.
- BFC Siófok: Molnár – Graszl, Mogyorósi, Novák, Márton – Kecskés (Délczeg 77.), Ludánszki (Kocsis 69.), Ribeiro, Turosi, Piller – Sowunmi (Csermelyi 82.). Coach: István Mihalecz.
- G.: Aleksidze (68.)
- Y.: Sharashenidze (55.), Stevanovic (76.), Tokody (89.)
- R:: Mogyorósi (67.), Piller (76.)

13 August 2010
20:45 CEST

Vasas SC	2 – 1 (1 – 0)	Győri ETO FC
Ferenczi 4' (pen.); Lázok (yellow card) 12'; Bakos (yellow card) 47'; Benounes 62'; Hrepka (yellow card) 78'	(Report)	Đorđević (yellow card) 3'; Szabó (yellow card) 37'; Stanišić (yellow card) 49'; Tokody 88'

Stadion Rudolf Illovszky, Budapest
Attendance: 1,200
Referee: Péter Solymosi
- Vasas SC: Végh – Balog, Arnaut, Gáspár, Katona – Benounes (Arsic 75.), Bakos, Pavicevic, Kovács, Lázok (Hrepka 65.) – Ferenczi. Coach: Giovanni Dellacasa.
- Győri ETO FC: Stevanovic – Babic, Djordjevic, Stanisic, Szabó – Tokody, Fehér, Dinjar (Copa 55.), Koltai (Bouguerra 46.) – Nicorec (Trajkovic 46.), Aleksidze. Coach: Attila Pintér.
- G.: Ferenczi (4. - pen.), Benounes (62.) – Tokody (88.)
- Y.: Lázok (12.), Bakos (47.), Hrepka (78.) – Djordjevic (3.), Szabó (37.), Stanisic (49.)

22 August 2010
20:00 CEST

Győri ETO FC	1 – 1 (0 – 1)	MTK Budapest FC
Trajković 48'; Ganugrava (yellow card) 56'	(Report)	Kanta (yellow card) 24' (goal) 28'; Ladányi (yellow card) 76'; Sütő (yellow card) 90+1'

ETO Park, Győr
Attendance: 2,500
Referee: János Takács
- Győri ETO FC: Stevanovic – Babic, Stanisic, Eugene, Völgyi – Cetkovic (Ceolin 37.), Pilibaitis (Tokody 69.), Ganugrava, Trajkovic – Bouguerra, Sharashenidze (Ji-Paraná 71.). Coach: Attila Pintér.
- MTK Budapest FC: Szatmári – Vukadinovic, Sütő, Pintér, Vadnai – Kanta, Pátkai (Ladányi 52.), Szekeres, Szabó (Könyves 62.), A. Pál – Tischler (Nikházi 86.). Coach: József Garami.
- G.: Trajkovic (48.) – Kanta (28.)
- Y.: Ganugrava (56.) – Kanta (24.), Ladányi (76.), Sütő (91.)

1 September 2010
19:00 CEST

Ferencvárosi TC	3 – 0 (2 – 0)	Győri ETO FC
Heinz 1' 17'; Schembri 47'; Rósa (yellow card) 67'	(Report)	Eugene (yellow card) 9'; Völgyi (yellow card) 25'; Stevanović (yellow card) 67'; Ji-Paraná (yellow card) 67'; Fehér (yellow card) 78'

Stadion Albert Flórián, Budapest
Attendance: 10,000
Referee: Ferenc Bede
- Ferencvárosi TC: Ranilovic – Balog, Csizmadia, Junior (Pölöskey 86.) – Rósa, Maróti, Józsi, Tóth (Jakimovski 81.) – Schembri, Heinz, Andrezinho (Adriano 68.). Coach: László Prukner.
- Győri ETO FC: Stevanovic – Völgyi, Fehér, Babic, Szabó – Ji-Paraná (Kiss 70.), Tokody, Ganugrava, Trajkovic (Aleksidze 55.), Eugene (Koltai 25.) – Bouguerra. Coach: Attila Pintér.
- G.: Heinz (1., 17.), Schembri (47.)
- Y.: Rósa (67.) – Eugene (9.), Völgyi (25.), Stevanovic (67.), Ji-Paraná (67.), Fehér (78.)

10 September 2010
19:00 CEST

Győri ETO FC	3 – 0 (1 – 0)	Debreceni VSC
Koltai 7' 67'; Ji-Paraná (yellow card) 38'; Aleksidze (yellow card) 43' (goal) 87'	(Report)	Nagy (yellow card) 34'; B. Farkas (red card) 42'; Komlósi (yellow card) 43'; Varga (yellow card) 84'

ETO Park, Győr
Attendance: 3,000
Referee: Mihály Fábián
- Győri ETO FC: Stevanovic – Babic, Fehér, Szabó, Völgyi – Tokody, Ji-Paraná (Dinjar 57.), Pilibaitis, Koltai (Cetkovic 80.) – Ceolin (Trajkovic 70.), Aleksidze. Coach: Attila Pintér.
- Debreceni VSC: Malinauskas – Nagy (Farkas 37.), Komlósi, Mijadinoski, Laczkó – Czvitkovics, Kiss, Varga, Szakály (Dombi 67.) – Coulibaly (Rezes 75.), Yannick. Coach: András Herczeg.
- G.: Koltai (7., 67.), Aleksidze (87.)
- Y.: Ji-Paraná (38.), Aleksidze (43.) – Nagy (34.), Komlósi (43.), Varga (84.)
- R:: Farkas (42.)

18 September 2010
15:00 CEST

Szolnoki MÁV FC	0 – 3 (0 – 1)	Győri ETO FC
Pető (yellow card) 33'; Molnár (yellow card) 61' (yellow-red card) 89'; Hevesi-Tóth (yellow card) 69'	(Report)	Tokody (yellow card) 28'; Koltai 37'; Trajković (yellow card) 45'; Ceolin 51' 73'; Dinjar (yellow card) 79'; Pilibaitis (yellow card) 80' (yellow-red card) 87'

Tiszaligeti Stadion, Szolnok
Attendance: 1,500
Referee: József Berger
- Szolnoki MÁV FC: Tarczy – Schindler, Stanisic, Pető, Hevesi-Tóth – Remili, Molnár, Koós, Búrány (Marozas 74.), Tchami (Lengyel 46.) – Alex (Ngalle 56.). Coach: Attila Vágó.
- Győri ETO FC: Stevanovic – Babic, Djordjevic, Fehér, Völgyi (Szabó O. 60.) – Ceolin (Dinjar 78.), Tokody, Pilibaitis, Koltai – Nicorec (Trajkovic 13.), Aleksidze. Coach: Attila Pintér.
- G.: Koltai (37.), Ceolin (51., 73.)
- Y.: Pető (33.), Molnár (61.), Hevesi-Tóth (69.) – Tokody (28.), Trajkovic (45.), Dinjar (79.), Pilibaitis (80.)
- R.: Molnár (89.) – Pilibaitis (87.)

25 September 2010
17:30 CEST

Győri ETO FC	0 – 1 (0 – 0)	Zalaegerszegi TE
Kiss (yellow card) 28'; Aleksidze (yellow card) 42'; Fehér (yellow card) 84'	(Report)	Kocsárdi (yellow card) 25'; Pavičević (yellow card) 43'; Illés (yellow card) 48'; Bogunović 82'

ETO Park, Győr
Attendance: 3,500
Referee: István Vad
- Győri ETO FC: Stevanovic – Fehér, Djordjevic, Szabó – Kiss, Tokody, Ganugrava, Trajkovic (Dinjar 69.), Völgyi (Cetkovic 57.) – Koltai (Sharashenidze 54.), Aleksidze. Coach: Attila Pintér.
- Zalaegerszegi TE: Vlaszák – Kocsárdi, Miljatovic (Bogunovic 67.), Varga, Panikvar – Horváth, Kamber, Máté, Illés (Delic 74.) – Pavicevic (Simon 62.), Rajcomar. Coach: János Csank.
- G.: Bogunovic (82.)
- Y.: Kiss (28.), Aleksidze (42.), Fehér (84.) – Kocsárdi (25.), Pavicevic (43.), Illés (48.)

2 October 2010
17:30 CEST

Szombathelyi Haladás	3 – 3 (1 – 2)	Győri ETO FC
Sipos 13' (yellow card) 89'; Lengyel (yellow card) 21' (goal) 49'; Schimmer 70'; Kenesei (yellow card) 76'	(Report)	Pilibaitis 5' (yellow card) 54'; Trajković 41'; Aleksidze 47' (yellow card) 64'; Đorđević (yellow card) 71'

Rohonci úti Stadion, Szombathely
Attendance: 3,000
Referee: Zoltán Iványi
- Szombathelyi Haladás: Rózsa – Schimmer, Guzmics, Lengyel, Tóth – Irhás (Lattenstein 86.), Molnár, Sipos – Nagy, Kenesei, Oross (Obric 55.). Coach: Aurél Csertői.
- Győri ETO FC: Stevanovic – Tokody, Djordjevic, Fehér, Szabó – Ganugrava (Ji-Paraná 57.), Pilibaitis, Kiss (Trajkovic 31.), Koltai – Bouguerra (Copa 80.), Aleksidze. Coach: Attila Pintér.
- G.: Sipos (13.), Lengyel (49.), Schimmer (70.) – Pilibaitis (5.), Trajkovic (41.), Aleksidze (47.)
- Y.: Lengyel (21.), Kenesei (76.), Sipos (89.) – Pilibaitis (54.), Aleksidze (64.), Djordjevic (71.)

15 October 2010
17:00 CEST

Győri ETO FC	0 – 1 (0 – 0)	Lombard-Pápa TFC
Trajković (yellow card) 8'; Đorđević (yellow card) 64' (yellow-red card) 79'	(Report)	Marić (yellow card) 38'; A. Farkas (yellow card) 44'; Abwo 81'

ETO Park, Győr
Attendance: 2,000
Referee: József Berger
- Győri ETO FC: Stevanovic – Tokody (Fehér 29.), Djordjevic, Stanisic, Szabó – Koltai, Trajkovic (Ganugrava 62.), Pilibaitis, Völgyi (Ceolin 61.) – Bouguerra, Aleksidze. Coach: Attila Pintér.
- Lombard-Pápa TFC: Szűcs – Takács, Supic, Farkas, Németh – Rebryk (Quintero 87.), Gyömbér, Bárányos. Zulevs (Abwo 57.) – Maric, Heffler (Tóth 92.). Coach: György Véber.
- G.: Abwo (81.)
- Y.: Trajkovic (8.), Djordjevic (64.) – Maric (38.), Farkas (44.)
- R:: Djordjevic (79.)

22 October 2010
17:00 CEST

Paksi SE	2 – 1 (0 – 0)	Győri ETO FC
Vayer 75'; Böde 79'	(Report)	Völgyi (yellow card) 35'; Bouguerra 62'; Szabó (yellow card) 74'; Stanišić (yellow card) 77'; Pilibaitis (yellow card) 77'; Eugene (yellow card) 90+1'

Stadion PSE, Paks
Attendance: 1,400
Referee: Tamás Bognár
- Paksi SE: Csernyánszki – Heffler, Éger, Fiola (Lisztes 93.), Csehi – Magasföldi (Báló 65.), Böde, Sifter, Vayer – Bartha, Montvai (Kiss 62.). Coach: Károly Kis.
- Győri ETO FC: Sánta – Fehér, Stanisic, Eugene, Völgyi – Dinjar (Aleksidze 51.), Copa (Szabó 68.), Pilibaitis, Trajkovic – Bouguerra, Koltai (Ceolin 46.). Coach: Attila Pintér.
- G.: Vayer (75.), Böde (79.) – Bouguerra (62.)
- Y.: Völgyi (35.), Szabó (74.), Stanisic (77.), Pilibaitis (77.), Eugene (91.)

30 October 2010
17:30 CEST

Győri ETO FC	2 – 1 (2 – 1)	Kecskeméti TE
Fehér (yellow card) 16'; Pilibaitis 18' (pen.); Bouguerra 38'; Đorđević (yellow card) 58'; Völgyi (yellow card) 72'	(Report)	Némedi 45+2' (pen.); Ebala (yellow card) 76'; Litsingi (yellow card) 82'

ETO Park, Győr
Attendance: 2,500
Referee: Sándor Andó-Szabó
- Győri ETO FC: Radosavljević – Fehér, Stanisic, Dordevic, Szabó (Völgyi 15.) – Tokody (Ganugrava 90.), Pilibaitis, Trajkovic, Koltai (Sharashenidze 62.) – Ceolin, Bouguerra. Coach: Attila Pintér.
- Kecskeméti TE - Ereco: Rybánsky – Alempijevic, Némedi, Balogh, Mohl – Bori (Csordás 80.), Cukic (Dosso 80.), Foxi, Savic (Ebala 64.), Litsingi – Tököli. Coach: Tomislav Sivic.
- G.: Pilibaitis (18. - pen.), Bouguerra (38.) – Némedi (45.+2 - pen.)
- Y.: Fehér (16.), Dordevic (58.), Völgyi (72.) – Ebala (76.), Litsingi (82.)

7 November 2010
19:00 CEST

Budapest Honvéd FC	1 – 1 (0 – 0)	Győri ETO FC
Hajdú 48' (pen.)	(Report)	Copa (yellow card) 20'; Bouguerra (yellow card) 34'; Völgyi 67'

Bozsik Stadion, Budapest
Attendance: 1,500
Referee: Zoltán Iványi
- Budapest Honvéd FC: Kemenes – Takács, Debreceni, Botis, Hajdú – Abass, Horváth (Akassou 72.), Moreira, Danilo – Bojtor (Sadjo 79.), Rouani (Rufino 75.). Coach: Massimo Morales.
- Győri ETO FC: Radosavljević – Fehér, Stanisic, Eugene, Völgyi – Copa, Kiss (Ji-Paraná 46.), Pilibaitis, Koltai (Aleksidze 65.) – Ceolin (Marinelli 59.), Bouguerra. Coach: Attila Pintér.
- G.: Hajdú (48. - pen.) – Völgyi (67.)
- Y.: Copa (20.), Bouguerra (34.)

12 November 2010
19:00 CEST

Győri ETO FC	1 – 1 (0 – 0)	Videoton FC Fehérvár
Đorđević (yellow card) 1'; Trajković (yellow card) 36'; Stanišić (red card) 53'; Gnaugrava 85'; Fehér (red card) 91'	(Report)	Lipták (yellow card) 45'; Vaskó (yellow card) 52' (yellow-red card) 84'; Elek (yellow card) 62'; Andić (yellow card) 82'; Alves 92' (pen.)

ETO Park, Győr
Attendance: 2,600
Referee: Ferenc Bede
- Győri ETO FC: Stevanovic – Fehér, Stanisic, Djordjevic, Völgyi – Dinjar (Koltai 46.), Copa (Eugene 56.), Pilibaitis, Trajkovic, Tokody (Ganugrava 47.) – Bouguerra. Coach: Attila Pintér.
- Videoton FC Fehérvár: Bozovic – Lázár, Lipták, Vaskó, Andic – Sándor (Gosztonyi 60.), Vasiljevic (Szakály 79.), Farkas, Elek, Polonkai (Nikolic 46.) – Alves. Coach: György Mezey.
- G.: Ganugrava (85.) – Alves (92. - pen.)
- Y.: Djordjevic (1.), Trajkovic (36.) – Lipták (45.), Vaskó (52.), Elek (62.), Andic (82.)
- R:: Stanisic (53.), Fehér (91.) – Vaskó (84.)

19 November 2010
17:00 CEST

Kaposvári Rákóczi FC	3 – 0 (1 – 0)	Győri ETO FC
Oláh 13' 57'; Pedro (yellow card) 38' (goal) 59'	(Report)	Ganugrava (yellow card) 12'; Copa (yellow card) 13'; Völgyi (yellow card) 63'; Pilibaitis (yellow card) 67'

Stadion Kaposvár Rákoczi, Kaposvár
Attendance: 1,500
Referee: Péter Solymosi
- Kaposvári Rákóczi FC: Milinte – Grúz, Zsók, Zahorecz – Gujic, Hegedűs, Balázs, Pedro, Jawad (Pavlovic 86.) – Szepessy (Kulcsár 56.), Oláh (Peric 77.). Coach: Tibor Sisa.
- Győri ETO FC: Stevanovic – Copa, Djordjevic, Eugene, Völgyi – Trajkovic (Sharashenidze 60.), Ganugrava (Ji-Paraná 30.), Pilibaitis (Briones 68.), Koltai – Ceolin, Bouguerra. Coach: Attila Pintér.
- G.: Oláh (13., 57.), Pedro (59.)
- Y.: Pedro (38.) – Ganugrava (12.), Copa (13.), Völgyi (63.), Pilibaitis (67.)

28 November 2010
17:30 CEST

Győri ETO FC	2 – 1 (1 – 0)	Újpest FC
Bouguerra 42'; Völgyi (yellow card) 55'; Ceolin 87'	(Report)	Rajczi (yellow card) 57'; Simon 60'; Tajthy (yellow card) 71'; Vermes (yellow card) 90+2'

ETO Park, Győr
Attendance: 1,000
Referee: Zoltán Iványi
- Győri ETO FC: Stevanovic – Copa, Eugene, Totadze, Völgyi – Dinjar (Ceolin 70.), Ganugrava, Pilibaitis, Trajkovic (Koltai 65.) – Aleksidze (Marinelli 78.), Bouguerra. Coach: Attila Pintér.
- Újpest FC: Balajcza – Pollák, Szokol (Kiss 46.), Takács, Vermes – Kovács (Sitku 37.), Mitrovic, Simon (Simek 79.), Tajthy – Rajczi, Tisza. Coach: Géza Mészöly.
- G.: Bouguerra (42.), Ceolin (87.) – Simon (60.)
- Y.: Völgyi (55.) – Rajczi (57.), Tajthy (71.), Vermes (92.)

25 February 2011
17:00 CEST

BFC Siófok	0 – 1 (0 – 1)	Győri ETO FC
Graszl (yellow card) 91'	(Report)	Aleksidze 20' (yellow card) 73'

Révész Street Stadium, Siófok
Attendance: 300
Referee: Roland Veizer
- BFC Siófok: Molnár – Mogyorósi, Graszl, Novák – Katona, Tusori, Kecskés (Csermelyi 81.), Lukács (Melczer 75.) – Csordás, Nomel (Homma 59.), Délczeg. Coach: István Mihalecz.
- Győri ETO FC: Stevanovic – Takács, Djordjevic, Stanisic – Kiss (Ji-Paraná 46.), Koltai (Copa 82.), Pilibaitis, Trajkovic, Dinjar – Aleksidze, Bouguerra (Sharashenidze 69.). Coach: Attila Pintér.
- G.: Aleksidze (20.)
- Y.: Graszl (91.) – Aleksidze (73.)

5 March 2011
16:00 CEST

Győri ETO FC	0 – 1 (0 – 1)	Vasas SC
Bouguerra (yellow card) 21'; Copa (yellow card) 71'; Stanišić (yellow card) 78'; Kiss (yellow card) 81'	(Report)	Gáspár 35'; Rezes (yellow card) 78'; Kovács (yellow card) 86'

ETO Park, Győr
Attendance: 1,400
Referee: Szabolcs Szilasi
- Győri ETO FC: Stevanovic – Takács, Djordjevic, Stanisic, Völgyi – Koltai (Niksic 53.), Pilibaitis (Kiss 57.), Ji-Paraná, Trajkovic – Aleksidze, Bouguerra (Copa 65.). Coach: Attila Pintér.
- Vasas SC: G. Németh – Balog (Szilágyi 47.), Gáspár, Mileusnic, Présinger – Kulcsár, Lisztes (Ponczók 65.), Kovács, Rezes – Ferenczi, Lázok (Beliczky 85.). Coach: András Komjáti.
- G.: Gáspár (35.)
- Y.: Bouguerra (21.), Copa (71.), Stanisic (78.), Kiss (81.) – Rezes (78.), Kovács (86.)

11 March 2011
17:00 CEST

Újpest FC	0 – 0 (0 – 0)	Győri ETO FC
Könyves (yellow card) 38'; Kanta (yellow card) 76'; Urbán (yellow card) 84'; Tischler (yellow card) 87'	(Report)	Völgyi (yellow card) 10'; Stanišić (yellow card) 12'

Hidegkuti Nándor Stadium, Budapest
Attendance: 1,000
Referee: Alvaro Miquel Garcia
- MTK Budapest FC: Szatmári – Vukadinovic, Sütő, Szekeres, Vadnai (Vukmir 65.) – Könyves, Pátkai (Urbán 46.), Kanta, Gál, Ladányi – Eppel (Tischler 84.). Coach: József Garami.
- Győri ETO FC: Stevanovic – Takács, Stanisic, Djordjevic, Völgyi – Dinjar (Niksic 86.), Kiss, Ji-Paraná, Pilibaitis, Koltai (Bouguerra 86.) – Aleksidze (Copa 86.). Coach: Aurél Csertői.
- G.: —
- Y.: Könyves (38.), Kanta (76.), Urbán (84.), Tischler (87.) – Völgyi (10.), Stanisic (12.)

19 March 2011
17:30 CEST

Győri ETO FC	1 – 0 (0 – 0)	Ferencvárosi TC
Völgyi (yellow card) 42'; Koltai (yellow card) 48'; Aleksidze 50'; Pilibaitis (yellow card) 93'	(Report)	Maróti (yellow card) 34'

ETO Park, Győr
Attendance: 5,000
Referee: Sándor Andó-Szabó
- Győri ETO FC: Stevanovic – Takács, Djordjevic, Fehér, Völgyi – Dinjar (Dudás 70.), Kiss, Pilibaitis, Ji-Paraná – Aleksidze (Trajkovic 76.), Koltai (Bouguerra 76.). Coach: Aurél Csertői.
- Ferencvárosi TC: Ranilovic – Csizmadia, Tutoric, Dragóner, Rodenbücher – Rósa, Maróti (Stanic 52.), Andrezinho (Tóth 55.) – Schembri, Heinz, Morales (Abdi 68.). Coach: László Prukner.
- G.: Aleksidze (50.)
- Y.: Völgyi (42.), Koltai (48.), Pilibaitis (93.) – Maróti (34.)

3 April 2011
17:30 CEST

Debreceni VSC	1 – 1 (0 – 0)	Győri ETO FC
Czvitkovics 50' (pen.); Bernáth (yellow card) 75'; Mardare (yellow card) 80'; Kabát (yellow card) 87'	(Report)	Pilibaitis (yellow card) 49'; Dinjar 60'; Ceolin (yellow card) 84'; Dudás (yellow card) 91'

Stadion Oláh Gábor Út, Debrecen
Attendance: 5,000
Referee: Tamás Bognár
- Debreceni VSC: Verpecz – Bernáth, Komlósi, Mijadinoski, Mardare – Czvitkovics, Varga, Bódi, Szakály – Coulibaly, Illés (Kabát 68.). Coach: Zdenek Scasny.
- Győri ETO FC: Stevanovic – Takács, Fehér, Dordevic, Völgyi – Dinjar (Dudás 86.), Kiss, Pilibaitis, Ji-Paraná, Koltai (Ceolin 74.) – Aleksidze (Bouguerra 79.). Coach: Aurél Csertői.
- G.: Czvitkovics (50. - pen.) – Dinjar (60.)
- Y.: Bernáth (75.), Mardare (80.), Kabát (87.) – Pilibaitis (49.), Ceolin (84.), Dudás (91.)

9 April 2011
17:30 CEST

Győri ETO FC	4 – 2 (1 – 0)	Szolnoki MÁV FC
Fehér (yellow card) 23'; Dinjar 31'; Ji-Paraná 54'; Đorđević 91'; Völgyi (yellow card) 91'; Dudás 92' (yellow card) 92'	(Report)	Remili (yellow card) 45'; Némedi 50'; Miličić (yellow card) 54'; Ngalle (yellow card) 70' (yellow-red card) 83'; Máté (yellow card) 87'; Đurović 88'

ETO Park, Győr
Attendance: 2,000
Referee: Zoltán J. Kovács
- Győri ETO FC: Stevanovic – Takács, Djordjevic, Stanisic, Völgyi – Kiss, Fehér, Ji-Paraná (Ganugrava 68.), Dinjar – Koltai (Bouguerra 70.), Aleksidze (Dudás 88.). Coach: Aurél Csertői.
- Szolnoki MÁV FC: Melnichenko – Szalai, Milicic (Zsolnai 61.), Máté, Djurovic – Fitos (Lengyel 46.), Búrány, Némedi, Vukomanovic – Ngalle, Remili (Antal 75.). Coach: Antal Simon.
- G.: Dinjar (31.), Ji-Paraná (54.), Djordjevic (91.), Dudás (92.) – Némedi (50.), Djurovic (88.)
- Y.: Fehér (23.), Völgyi (91.), Dudás (92.) – Remili (45.), Milicic (54.), Ngalle (70.), Máté (87.)
- R:: Ngalle (83.)

16 April 2011
17:30 CEST

Zalaegerszegi TE	1 – 1 (0 – 0)	Győri ETO FC
Balázs (yellow card) 39'; Ganugrava 47' (o.g.)	(Report)	Eugene (yellow card) 36' (yellow-red card) 71'; Völgyi (yellow card) 36' (goal) 79'; Totadze (yellow card) 74'; Ganugrava (yellow card) 79'

ZTE Arena, Zalaegerszeg
Attendance: 2,750
Referee: István Vad
- Zalaegerszegi TE: Sipos – Kocsárdi, Miljatovic, Bogunovic, Panikvar – Simonfalvi (I. Delic 46.), Horváth (Rajcomar 77.), Kamber, Balázs – Simon (A. Delic 66.), Turkovs. Coach: János Csank.
- Győri ETO FC: Stevanovic – Fehér, Eugene, Stanisic, Völgyi – Kiss, Ganugrava (Bouguerra 66.), Pilibaitis, Dinjar – Koltai (Dudás 57.), Aleksidze (Totadze 72.). Coach: Aurél Csertői.
- G.: Ganugrava (47. - o.g.) – Völgyi (79.)
- Y.: Balázs (39.) – Eugene (36.), Völgyi (63.), Totadze (74.), Ganugrava (79.)
- R.: Eugene (71.)

22 April 2011
17:00 CEST

Győri ETO FC	2 – 2 (0 – 0)	Szombathelyi Haladás
Völgyi (yellow card) 40'; Aleksidze 55' 58'	(Report)	P. Tóth (yellow card) 11' (goal) 91'; Kenesei 81'; Rózsa (yellow card) 93'

ETO Park, Győr
Attendance: 2,500
Referee: Roland Veizer
- Győri ETO FC: Stevanovic (Radosavljević 63.) – Babic, Djordjevic (Stanisic 77.), Fehér, Völgyi – Kiss, Pilibaitis, Dinjar, Koltai – Aleksidze (Bouguerra 81.), Dudás. Coach: Aurél Csertői.
- Szombathelyi Haladás: Rózsa – Schimmer (Nagy II 15.), Guzmics, Korolovszky, P. Tóth – Sipos (Sluka 63.), Molnár, Á. Simon, Halmosi – Kenesei, Fodrek (Irhás 63.). Coach: Zoltán Aczél.
- G.: Aleksidze (55., 58.) – Kenesei (81.), P. Tóth (91.)
- Y.: Völgyi (40.) – P. Tóth (11.), Rózsa (93.)

26 April 2011
18:00 CEST

Lombard-Pápa TFC	2 – 1 (0 – 0)	Győri ETO FC
Žuļevs (yellow card) 30'; Rebryk (yellow card) 42'; Bárányos 65' (yellow card) 89'; Quintero (yellow card) 83'; Marić 94'	(Report)	Dinjar (yellow card) 15'; Babić (yellow card) 24'; Stanišić (yellow card) 47'; Pilibaitis (yellow card) 68'; Totadze (yellow card) 74' (goal) 88'; Aleksidze (yellow card) 94'

Stadion Várkerti, Pápa
Attendance: 1,500
Referee: Alvaro Miquel Garcia
- Lombard-Pápa TFC: Szűcs – Nagy, Dlusztus, Supic, Németh – Zulevs, Gyömbér, Bárányos – Heffler (Bali 46.), Maric, Rebryk (Quintero 80.). Coach: György Véber.
- Győri ETO FC: Stevanovic – Babic, Stanisic, Fehér, Totadze – Dinjar, Kiss, Pilibaitis (Trajkovic 75.), Koltai (Ji-Paraná 66.) – Dudás (Ceolin 46.), Aleksidze. Coach: Aurél Cserőti.
- G.: Bárányos (65.), Maric (94.) – Totadze (88.)
- Y.: Zulevs (30.), Rebryk (42.), Quintero (83.), Bárányos (89.) – Dinjar (15.), Babic (24.), Stanisic (47.), Pilibaitis (68.), Totadze (74.), Aleksidze (94.)

== Magyar Kupa ==
=== Fourth round ===
26 October 2010
14:30 CEST

Barcsi SC	1 – 7 (0 – 3)	Győri ETO FC
Koller (yellow card) 33' (goal) 90'; Dienes (yellow card) 61'	(Report)	Pilibaitis 22' (pen.); Ganugrava (yellow card) 28'; Bouguerra 30' 50'; Koltai 39' 84'; Ceolin 49' 54'

Városi Sporttelep, Barcs
Attendance: 150
Referee: Szabolcs Szilasi
- Barcsi SC: Halasi – Dienes (Bernando 66.), Balogh, Horváth, Pókos – Hock (Miskovics 51.), Kordé (Tompa 54.), Koller, Gergulás – Pavicevic, Scepanovic. Coach: Dragan Puskas.
- Győri ETO FC: Sánta – Fehér, Stanisic, Eugene (Dordevic 57.), Szabó – Ceolin, Ganugrava, Pilibaitis (Briones 52.), Koltai – Trajkovic (Marinelli 22.), Bouguerra. Coach: Attila Pintér.
- G.: Koller (90.) – Pilibaitis (22. - pen.), Bouguerra (30., 50.), Koltai (39., 84.), Ceolin (49., 54.)
- Y.: Koller (33.), Dienes (61.) – Ganugrava (28.)

=== Fifth round ===
==== First leg ====
9 November 2010
17:00 CEST

MTK Budapest FC	0 – 0 (0 – 0)	Győri ETO FC
Kanta (yellow card) 15'; Vukadinović (yellow card) 19'	(Report)	Aleksidze (yellow card) 37'; Eugene (yellow card) 78'; Ganugrava (yellow card) 80'

Stadion Hidegkuti Nándor, Budapest
Attendance: 500
Referee: Roland Veizer
- MTK Budapest FC: Szatmári – Vukadinovic, Szekeres, Sütő, Vadnai – Kanta, Vukmir, Ladányi – Könyves, Tischler (Eppel 74.), Szabó (Csiki 62.). Coach: József Garami.
- Győri ETO FC: Stevanovic – Fehér, Eugene, Stanisic, Völgyi – Ceolin (Bouguerra 46.), Ji-Paraná (Trajkovic 66.), Pilibaitis, Ganugrava – Copa, Aleksidze (Marinelli 70.). Coach: Attila Pintér.
- G.: —
- Y.: Kanta (15.), Vukadinovic (19.) – Aleksidze (37.), Eugene (78.), Ganugrava (80.)

== UEFA Europa League ==
=== Qualifying round ===
==== First qualifying round ====
===== First leg =====
1 July 2010
18:00 CEST

FC Nitra (Slovakia)	2 – 2 (1 – 1)	(Hungary) Győri ETO FC
Tóth 14'; Slobodan 80'	(Report)	Kink 39' 58'; Nicorec (yellow card) 87'

Štadión pod Zoborom, Nitra
Attendance: 2,560
Referee: (Cyprus) Marios Stamatis
- FC Nitra: Hrosso – Tóth, Lesko, Glenda, Kasprak – Stetina, Kolmokov, Hodur, Balis (Sloboda 70.) – Simonek (Mikus 46.), Valenta (Kolar 56.). Coach: Ivan Galád.
- Győri ETO FC: Sánta – Djordjevic, Fehér, Szabó (Völgyi 74.), Stanisic – Pilibaitis (Copa 32.), Kink, Koltai (Cetkovic 62.), Tokody – Aleksidze, Nicorec. Coach: Attila Pintér.
- G.: Tóth (13.), Sloboda (80.) – Kink (39., 58.)
- Y.: Nicorec (87.)

===== Second leg =====
8 July 2010
18:30 CEST

Győri ETO FC (Hungary)	3 – 1 (1 – 1) ( 5 – 3 agg.)	(Slovakia) FC Nitra
Aleksidze 22'; Nicorec (yellow card) 28' (goal) 60'; Kink (yellow card) 41' (goal) 90+2'; Tokody (yellow card) 53'	(Report)	Hodú 10'; Sloboda (yellow card) 50'; Leško (yellow card) 58'; Kaspřák (yellow card) 89'

ETO Park, Győr
Attendance: 4,200
Referee: (Slovenia) Matej Jug
- Győri ETO FC: Sánta – Djordjevic, Fehér, Szabó, Kiss (Babic 46.) – Pilibaitis, Kink, Koltai (Ceolin 57.), Tokody – Aleksidze (Copa 75.), Nicorec. Coach: Attila Pintér.
- FC Nitra: Hrosso – Tóth, Lesko, Glenda, Kasprak – Stetina, Hodur, Balis (Kolar 46.), Simoncic – Sloboda (Valenta 61.), Mikus (Rák 51.). Coach: Ivan Galád.
- G.: Aleksidze (22.), Nicorec (60.), Kink (92.) – Hodur (10.)
- Y.: Nicorec (28.), Kink (41.), Tokody (53.) – Sloboda (50.), Lesko (58.), Kasprák (89.)

Győri ETO FC won 5–3 on aggregate.

==== Second qualifying round ====
===== First leg =====
15 July 2010
16:00 CEST

FC Atyrau (Kazakhstan)	0 – 3^{1} (0 – 1)	(Hungary) Győri ETO FC
Aliyev (yellow card) 20'; Frunza (yellow card) 44'; Zhumabaev (yellow card) 86'	(Report)	Babić (yellow card) 19'; Pilibaitis 26'; Fehér (yellow card) 77'; Bouguerra (yellow card) 79' (goal) 88'

Munayshy Stadium, Atyrau
Attendance: 8,660
Referee: (Belgium) Johan Verbist
- FC Atyrau: Shabanov – Crnogorac, Aliyev, Zhumabayev, Vorotnikov – Mamonov, Peikrishvili (Chureev 84.), Kostrub, Shakin – Sakhalbayev (Larin 76.), Frunza (Khizhnichenko 59.). Coach: Victor Pasulko.
- Győri ETO FC: Stevanovic – Djordjevic, Fehér, Babic, Szabó – Stanisic, Pilibaitis, Kink (Bouguerra 65.), Koltai (Trajkovic 46.) – Copa, Aleksidze (Ceolin 46.). Coach: Attila Pintér.
- G.: Pilibaitis (26.), Bouguerra (88.)
- Y.: Aliyev (20.), Frunza (44.), Zhumabayev (86.) – Babic (19.), Fehér (77.), Bouguerra (79.)

===== Second leg =====
22 July 2010
20:30 CEST

Győri ETO FC (Hungary)	2 – 0 (0 – 0) ( 5 – 0 agg.)	(Kazakhstan) FC Atyrau
Aleksidze 47'; Nicorec 52'	(Report)	Sahalbayev (yellow card) 45'

ETO Park, Győr
Attendance: 3,300
Referee: (Albania) Sokol Jareci
- Győri ETO FC: Stevanovic – Djordjevic, Babic, Szabó, Stanisic – Pilibaitis, Kink, Dnijar (Copa 59.), Koltai (Sharashenidze 67.) – Aleksidze (Bouguerra 77.), Nicorec. Coach: Attila Pintér.
- FC Atyrau: Shabanov – Aliyev, Chureyev, Zhumabayev, Vorotnikov – Croitoru, Peikrishvili (Larin 70.), Kostrub, Shakin (Khizhnichenko 62.) – Sakhalbayev (Mamonov 75.), Frunza. Coach: Victor Pasulko.
- G.: Aleksidze (47.), Nicorec (52.)
- Y.: Shalabayev (45.)

Győri ETO FC won 5–0 on aggregate.

- Note 1: UEFA awarded Győri ETO a 3–0 win due to Atyrau fielding a suspended player in the first leg. The original match had ended in a 2–0 win for Győri ETO.

==== Third qualifying round ====
===== First leg =====
29 July 2010
20:30 CEST

Győri ETO FC (Hungary)	0 – 1 (0 – 1)	(France) Montpellier HSC
Copa (yellow card) 82'	(Report)	Jeunechamp (yellow card) 24'; Giroud 32'; Estrada (yellow card) 90'

ETO Park, Győr
Attendance: 7,000
Referee: (Poland) Marcin Borski
- Győri ETO FC: Stevanovic – Babic, Djordjevic, Stanisic, Szabó – Dinjar, Koltai (Sharashenidze 66.), Nicorec (Copa 52.), Pilibaitis, Ceolin – Aleksidze (Bouguerra 58.). Coach: Attila Pintér.
- Montpellier HSC: Jourdren – El-Kaoutari, Spahic, Yangambiwa, Jeunechamp – Pitau, Estrada (Saihi 90.), Belhanda (Marveaux 71.) – Kabze (Ait-Fana 64.), Giroud, Camara. Coach: René Girard.
- G.: Giroud (32.)
- Y.: Copa (82.) – Jeunechamp (24.), Estrada (90.)

===== Second leg =====
5 August 2010
20:45 CEST

Montpellier HSC (France)	0 – 1 (0 – 1) ( 1 – 1 agg.)	(Hungary) Győri ETO FC
Collin (yellow card) 75'; Spahić (yellow card) 114'; Giroud (yellow card) 117'; Saihi (yellow card) 118'	(Report)	Stanišić (yellow card) 6' (yellow-red card) 45'; Babić 40' (yellow card) 89'; Aleksidze (yellow card) 90+3'
Penalties
Spahić (penalty scored); Camara (penalty missed); Estrada (penalty missed); Giroud (penalty scored); Armand (penalty scored)	3 – 4	Babić (penalty scored); Aleksidze (penalty missed); Pilibaitis (penalty scored); Fehér (penalty scored); Tokody (penalty scored)

Stade de la Mosson, Montpellier
Attendance: 9,918
Referee: (Finland) Mattias Gestranius
- Montpellier HSC: Jourdren – Collin (Armand 94.), Spahic, Yangambiwa, Stambouli – Estrada, Saihi, Marveaux (Camara 63.) – Ait-Fana, Giroud, Kabze (Belhanda 63.). Coach: René Girard.
- Győri ETO FC: Stevanovic – Babic, Djordjevic, Stanisic, Szabó – Pilibaitis, Ceolin (Copa 66.), Nicorec (Fehér 46.), Tokody, Koltai (Cetkovic 78.) – Aleksidze. Coach: Attila Pintér.
- G.: Babic (40.)
- Y.: Collin (75.), Spahic (114.), Giroud (117.), Saihi (118.) – Stanisic (6.), Babic (89.), Aleksidze (90.+3)
- R.: Stanisic (45.)

Montpellier 1–1 Győri ETO on aggregate. Győri ETO won 4–3 on penalties.

==== Play-off round ====
===== First leg =====
19 August 2010
21:00 CEST

Győri ETO FC (Hungary)	0 – 2 (0 – 2)	(Croatia) NK Dinamo Zagreb
Pilibaitis (yellow card) 21'; Đorđević (yellow card) 52'; Trajković (yellow card) 87'; Szabó (yellow card) 90+1'	(Report)	Rukavina 19' 28'; Sivonjić (yellow card) 77'

ETO Park, Győr
Attendance: 8,500
Referee: (Switzerland) Stephan Studer
- Győri ETO FC: Stevanovic – Tokody, Djordjevic, Fehér, Szabó – Koltai, Pilibaitis (Trajkovic 78.), Dinjar (Ji-Paraná 34.), Copa (Bouguerra 53.), Ceolin – Aleksidze. Coach: Attila Pintér.
- NK Dinamo Zagreb: Loncaric – Vrsaljko, Biscan, Cufré, Ibánez – Callelo, Badelj, Etto (Ademi 87.), Sammir, Morales (Mesaric 56.) – Rukavina (Sivonjic 76.). Coach: Vahid Halilhodzic.
- G.: Rukavina (19., 28.)
- Y.: Pilibaitis (21.), Djordjevic (52.), Trajkovic (87.), Szabó (91.) – Sivonjic (77.)

===== Second leg =====
26 August 2010
21:00 CEST

NK Dinamo Zagreb (Croatia)	2 – 1 (1 – 1) ( 4 – 1 agg.)	(Hungary) Győri ETO FC
Mesarić (yellow card) 20'; Sammir 45+2' (pen.) 84' (pen.); Rukavina (yellow card) 73'	(Report)	Ceolin 17'; Szabó (yellow card) 45'; Fehér (yellow card) 64'; Stevanović (yellow card) 82'; Babić (yellow card) 87'; Völgyi (yellow card) 88'

Stadion Maksimir, Zagreb
Attendance: 8,000
Referee: (England) Andre Marriner
- NK Dinamo Zagreb: Loncaric – Biscan, Cufré, Mesaric (Etto 33.), Vrsaljko – Ademi, Badelj, Morales (Dodo 66.), Sammir – Kramaric (Chago 79.), Rukavina. Coach: Vahid Halihodzic.
- Győri ETO FC: Stevanovic – Babic, Djordjevic, Fehér, Stanisic (Szabó 33.) – Koltai (Dinjar 56.), Pilibaitis, Tokody, Ceolin, Völgyi – Aleksidze (Bouguerra 66.). Coach: Attila Pintér.
- G.: Sammir (45.+2 - pen., 84. - pen.) – Ceolin (17.)
- Y.: Mesaric (20.), Rukavina (73.) – Szabó (45.), Fehér (64.), Stevanovic (82.), Babic (87.), Völgyi (88.)

NK Dinamo Zagreb won 4–1 on aggregate.
