= History of Győri ETO FC =

Hungarian football club history

Győri ETO FC is a Hungarian professional football club based in Győr, Hungary.

== Early years ==
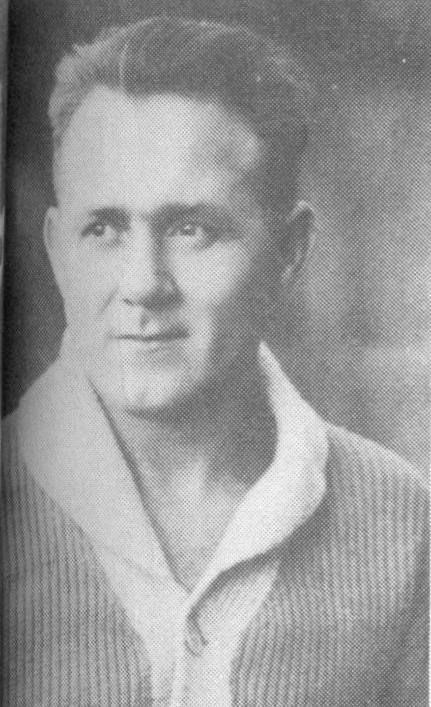
Rudolf Jeny managing Győr in the 1955 season of the Hungarian League

Győr first reached the Hungarian First Division in 1937, however their stay was brief. They were relegated straight back to the second division after finishing in 13th out of 14 teams in the 1937–38 season. In 1946 the club again reached the first division and this time they played 10 consecutive seasons in the top flight, until in 1955 they were relegated again. They again spent one season in the first league in 1958. After their next comeback in 1960, they played 55 years in the top flight, until they were relegated to the Nemzeti Bajnokság III at the end of the 2014–15 season.

== 1960s ==
In 1963 Győri ETO FC won the Hungarian National Championship I title for the first time. As a consequence, the team could enter the European Cup 1964-65 season. On 2 September 1964 Győr beat Chemie Leipzig 2–0 in Leipzig. In the second leg Győr won 4–2 and entered the first round of the qualification. In the first round Győr played their first match at home against Lokomotiv Sofia and they won the first leg by 5–3. In Sofia they lost to 4–3 but won on aggregate 8–7. In the quarter-finals Győr played the Dutch DWS. The first leg was played in Amsterdam at the Olympisch Stadion and the final result was 1–1. In the second leg at home Győr won the match 1–0, and therefore won 2–1 on aggregate. In the semi-finals Győr faced the Portuguese giant club Benfica and lost their first match 1–0 at home at the Népstadion (now Puskás Ferenc Stadium). In the second leg Benfica won 4–0 at the Estádio da Luz which resulted in the departure of Győr from the European Cup.

30 April 1965

Vasas ETO Győr (Hungary)	0–1	(Portugal) Benfica
	Report	José Augusto 71'

Népstadion, Budapest
Attendance: 62,327
Referee: Valdemar Hansen (Denmark)
6 May 1965

Benfica (Portugal)	4–0	(Hungary) Vasas ETO Győr
Eusébio 22', 42'; Torres 36', 40'	Report

Estádio da Luz, Lisbon
Attendance: 43,875
Referee: Michel Kitabdjian (France)

In 1965 Győr won the Hungarian Cup for the first time by beating Diósgyőri VTK 4–0 in the final held at the Népstadion therefore Győr could enter the UEFA Cup Winners' Cup 1966-67 season. In the first round Győr lost 1–0 (Chiarugi) to ACF Fiorentina in Florence but in the second leg they could beat the Italian club by 4–2 (Stolcz 2, Varsányi, Orbán) therefore they could advance on aggregate . In the first leg of the second round Győr beat SC Braga 3–0 at home. Although they lost 2–0 away, they could qualify for the quarter-finals of the Cup Winners' Cup. In the quarter-finals Győr won their first match 2–1 against the Belgian Standard Liège at home but they lost the second leg of the tie 2–0 which resulted the elimination of the club from the cup.

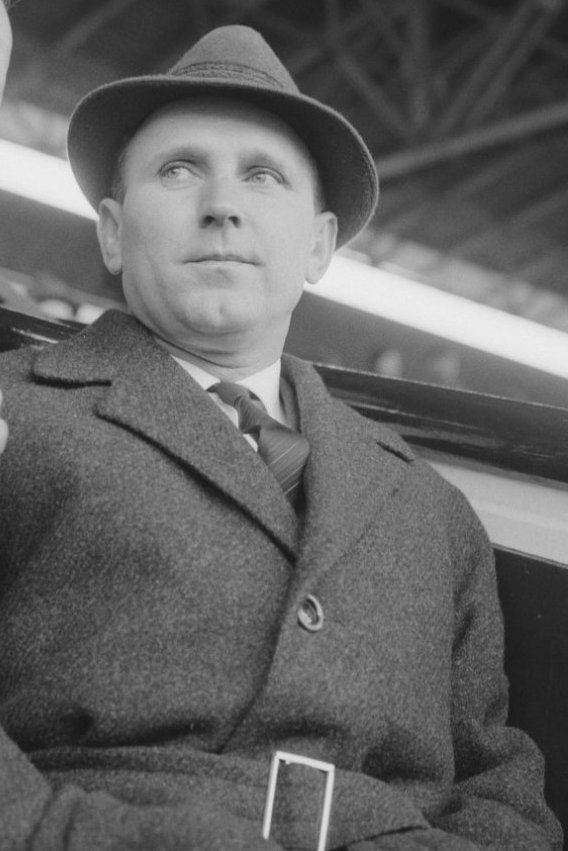
Nándor Hidegkuti won the 1963 season with the club

In 1966 Győr could keep the trophy of the Hungarian Cup by beating Ferencvárosi TC in a two-legged tie. The first match ended in a 1–1 draw, while Győr could win away by 3–2 obtaining their second cup title in a row. In the UEFA Cup Winners' Cup 1967-68 Győr beat the Cypriot Apollon Limassol 5–0 at home, while 4–0 away. In the second round Győr faced with the Italian giant club AC Milan. On 22 November 1967, at home both Győrfi and Sormani scored two goals ending the match in a 2–2 draw. In the second leg, on 7 December 1967, at the Stadio Giuseppe Meazza Szaló scored in the 6th minute which was equalized by Prati in the 22nd minute which resulted a 1–1 draw eliminating Győr from the cup without a lost match against AC Milan.

In 1967 Győr could triple their Hungarian Cup titles by beating Salgótarjáni BTC 1–0 in the final at the Népstadion in front of 3,000 spectators. In the UEFA Cup Winners' Cup 1968-69 Győr would have entered the first round of the tournament but due to the Warsaw Pact invasion of Czechoslovakia the club were forced to withdraw their participation.

== 1970s ==
In 1979 Győr won the Hungarian Cup for the fourth time by beating Ferencvárosi TC 1–0 at the Népstadion in front of 10,000 spectators. In the UEFA Cup Winners' Cup 1979-80 Győr faced the Italian giant club, Juventus FC On 19 September 1979, Juventus beat Győr 2–0 in Turin. Pozsgai's own goal in the 64th minute was followed by Cabrini's goal in the 73rd minute at the Stadio Olimpico di Torino In the second leg of the tie, on 3 October 1979, Győr was leading by 2–0 (Furino's scored an own goal in the 4th minute and Póczik in the 23rd) but in the second half Causio scored in the 52nd minute ending the match in 2–1 victory over Juventus which was not enough to advance in the cup.

== 1980s ==
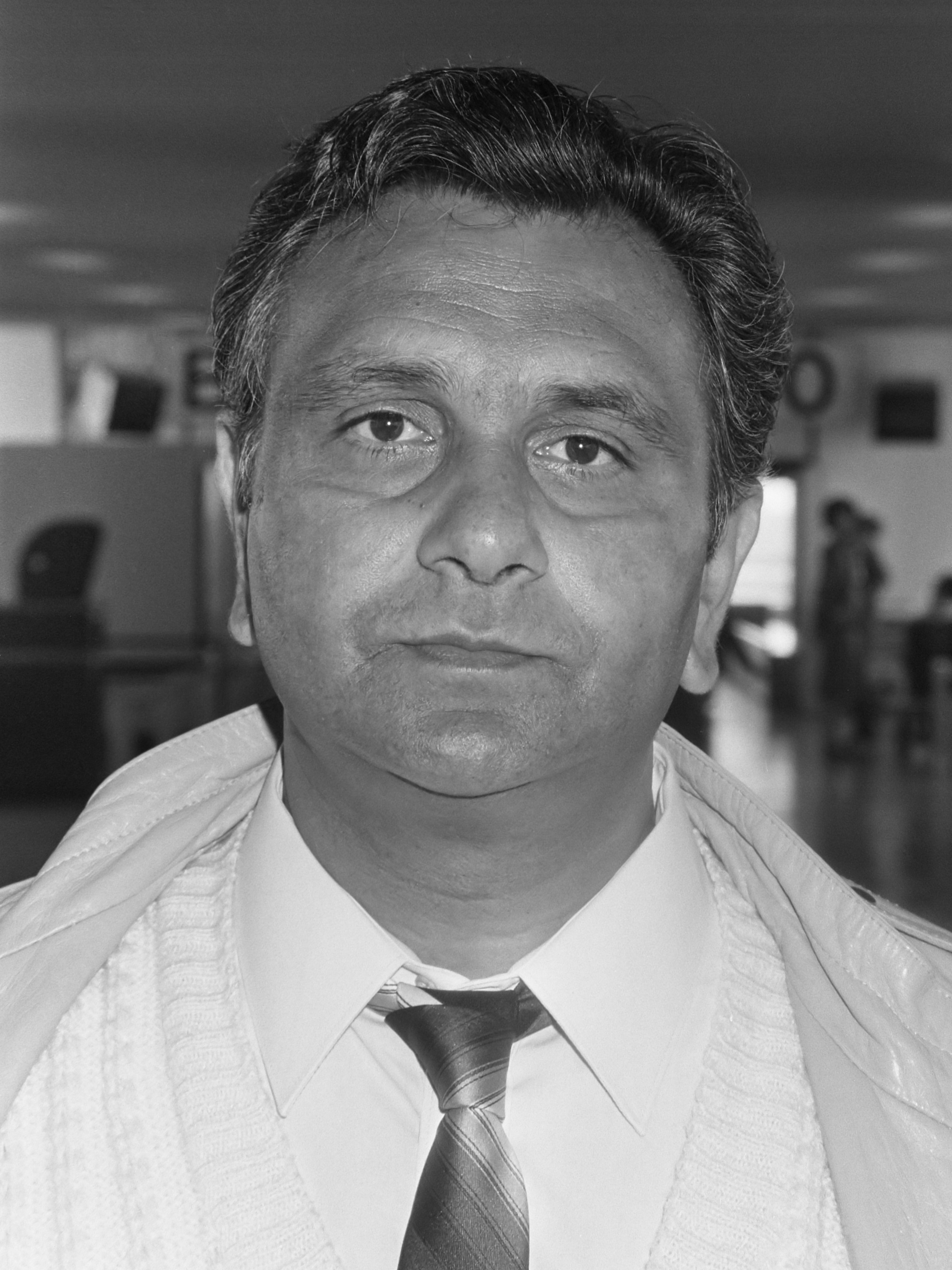
The longest serving and most successful manager, József Verebes a.k.a. "The magician" won the Hungarian League twice 1982 and 1983 with Győr

Győr reached their zenith in the early 1980s winning the 1981–82 and the 1982–83 season of the Hungarian League. Péter Hannich and Lázár Szentes scored 43 goals together out of the 102 goals during the 1981–82 season. The József Verebes led team gained 49 points applying the Dutch style of playing football. The following season Győr won the championship only in the last round gaining 44 points while Ferencváros came second with 43 points. In the 1982–83 season Győr scored 20 goals less than the previous season which was due to Lázár Szentes injuries while Péter Hannich scored 20 goals becoming the second top goal scorer in the season. Since the team won the 1981–82 season they entered the European Cup 1982-83. In the first leg of the first round of the tournament on 15 September 1982, Standard Liège hosted Győr at the Stade Maurice Dufrasne in Liège. The Belgian club beat Győr by 5–0. In the second leg, on 29 September 1982, Győr beat 3–0 Standard Liege at home but it was not sufficient to qualify for the next round.

In the European Cup 1983-84 Győr beat the Icelandic Víkingur in the first leg of the first round. Győr won the first leg 2–1 with the goals of Magyar and Burcsa. They won also in Iceland by 2–0 with the goals of Magyar and Szentes. In the second round Győr had to face a much more difficult opponent the Soviet Dinamo Minsk. The first match was played in Győr and the Soviet club won it by 6–3. In the away match Dinamo won 3–1 and eliminated the Hungarian club from the European cup.

In the 1983–84 season of the national league Győr finished runners-up in the Hungarian League therefore they qualified for the 1984-85 UEFA Cup. On 19 September 1984, Győr played with Manchester United F.C. at the Old Trafford and the final result was 3–0 to the English side. At home Győr drew with Manchester which resulted their farewell from the international cup.

In the 1984–85 season of the Hungarian League Győr came second after Budapest Honvéd. On international level Győr entered 1985-86 UEFA Cup. On 18 September 1985, Győr hosted the Czech FC Bohemians 1905 and beat 3–1. On 2 October 1985, the final result was 3–1 to the Prague team. In the extra time the Czech team scored another goal and qualified for the next round.

In the 1985–86 season of the Hungarian League the club finished third therefore they could enter the 1986-87 UEFA Cup. On 17 September 1986, Győr was hosted by Dinamo Minsk and Győr could win 4–2 away. On 1 October 1986, Győr lost 1–0 at home but could enter the second round on 4–3 aggregate. In the second round, on 22 October 1986, Győr was beaten 4–0 by Torino F.C. On 5 November 1986, Győr drew with Torino which resulted their farewell from the UEFA Cup.

In the 1986–87 season the club finished only 10th while in the following year they came closer to the top of the league by reaching fourth place.

== 1990s ==
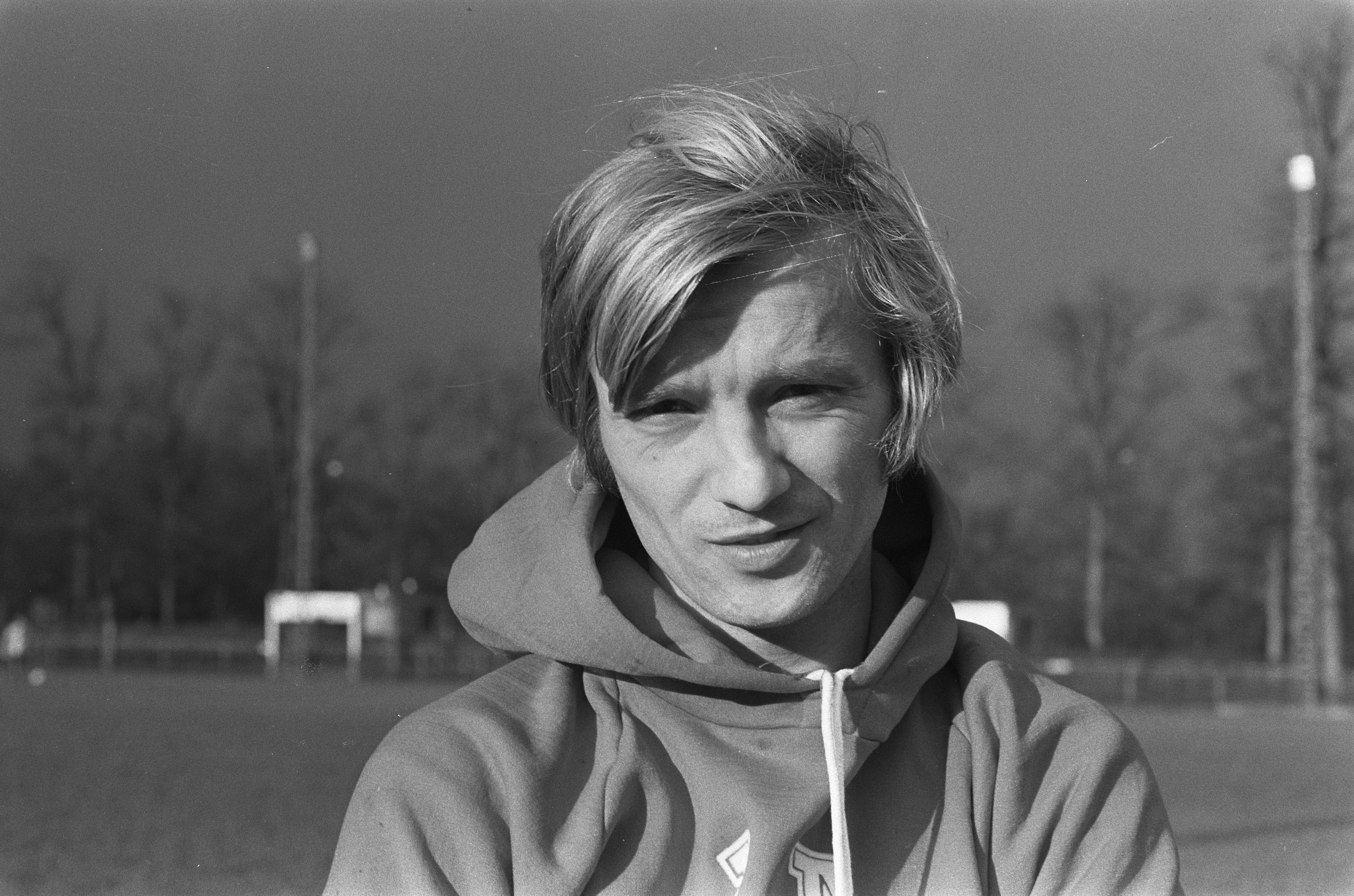
Ferencváros legend, Zoltán Varga managed Győr in 2001 and 2003

The 1990s did not start promising for the club since they finished only 11th in the 1990–91 and the 1991–92 season of the Hungarian League. In 1995–96 the club finished 15th in the league and had to play play-offs against the Western Hungarian rivals FC Sopron. The first match was won by Győr 2–0 while the away match was lost 2–1 which resulted in Győr remaining in the first division. After reaching the nadir of the history of the club, in the 1996–97 season Győr finished 9th and secured a place for the following season. In the 1997–98 and 1998–99 seasons the club finished fourth which were considered the best positions in the 1990s.

== 2000s ==
In January 2000 Antonio A. Paes join was selected for a tryout In January 2003 Aurél Csertői was appointed as the coach of the club. Attila Pintér became the coach of the Győri ETO FC in 2009. During his coaching the team finished third in the Hungarian League 2009–10 season after beating Videoton FC in the last round. On international turf the team entered the Europa League 2010-11 season. In the first qualifying round Győr played their first match against FC Nitra. The final result was 2–2. In the second leg Attila Pintér's team could win 3–1 at the ETO Park. In the second qualifying round Győr played their first match in Kazakhstan against Atyrau. The match finished 2–0 to Győr thanks to the goals of Linas Pilibaitis and Fouad Bouguerra. In the second leg Győr could win 2–0. The goals were scored by Rati Aleksidze and Mihai Nicorec. In the third qualifying round Győr played with the French Montpellier HSC. The first match was played at the ETO Park and the final result was 1–0 to the French team. The only goal of the match was scored by Olivier Giroud. In the second leg Győr won 1–0. The only goal was scored by Valentin Babić. In extra time there were no more goals therefore the teams had to decide the match in the penalty shootout. Győr won 4–3 on penalties and entered the play-offs of the Europa League. Győr played the Croatian Dinamo Zagreb in the play-off of the Europa League 2010-11. The first match was won by Zagreb 2–0. In the second leg at the Stadion Maksimir győr lost to 2–1 and were eliminated from the Europa League on 4–1 aggregate. Due to the increase of the number of matches the team were unable to do well both in the Hungarian League and in the Europa League. The results in the domestic league were not satisfying for the management, therefore Attila Pintér and the management mutually terminated the contract between each other and the management appointed Aurél Csertői as the manager.

== 2010s ==
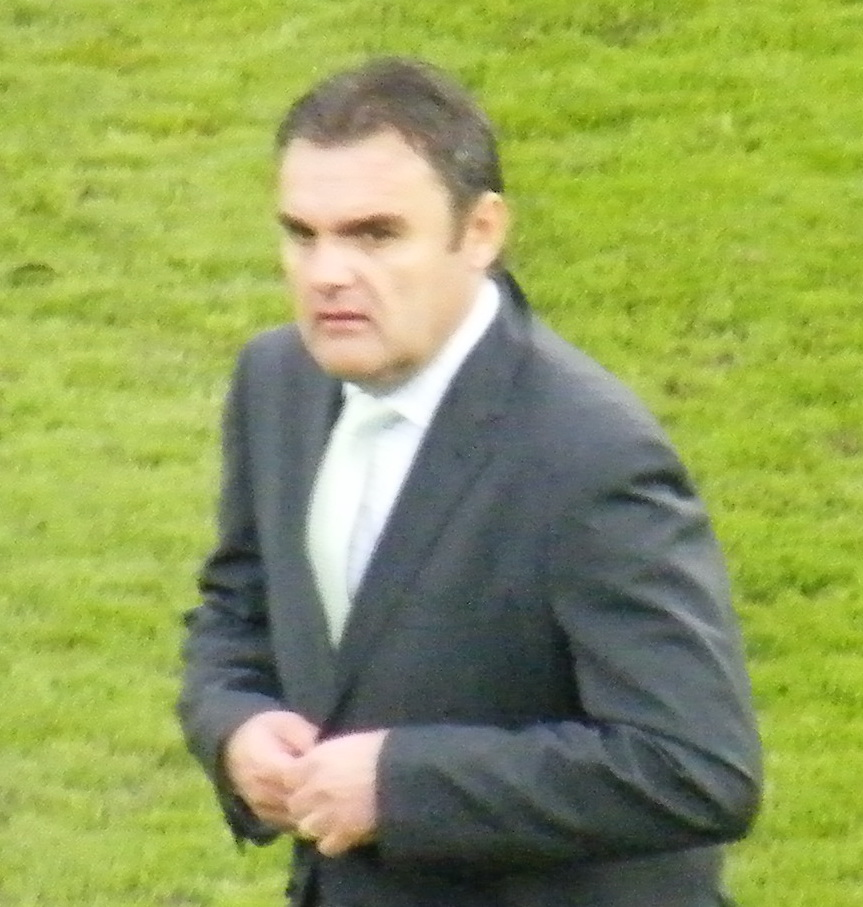
Attila Pintér won the fourth Hungarian League title in the 2012–13 season

In 2011 Aurél Csertői was appointed as the manager of the team. Győr started the 2011–12 season with seven consecutive wins. On 19 June 2011 UEFA suspended the club for violations of licensing rules. As a consequence the club cannot participate in European competitions for three consecutive seasons. In March 2012 Aurél Csertői and the club agreed to his departure and Attila Pintér was re-appointed as the manager of the club. In the 2011–12 season of the Hungarian League Győr finished third, however due to the suspension of the UEFA they could not enter the Europa League.

In the 2012/13 season of the Hungarian League Győr was leading the table 6 points clear.

On 12 May 2013, Győr ended a 30-year wait for the Hungarian League title by beating Ferencvárosi TC at home by 1–0, while their rival Videoton FC lost to Debreceni VSC 2–1 in the 27th weekday of the championship. In the 2012–13 season they went on a 22-match unbeaten run before back-to-back defeats knocked them off their stride. But neither Videoton FC nor MTK Budapest FC could sustain the challenge therefore Győr could wrap up their fourth title with room to spare.

On 22 May 2013, Győr could have double their success by winning the 2012–13 Magyar Kupa against Debreceni VSC at the Bozsik Stadion, Budapest. Győr was winning by 1–0 thanks to the goal by Nemanja Andrić in the 19th minute but in the second half Debrecen's Adamo Coulibaly scored two goals which resulted Debrecen's victory over Győr in the Hungarian Cup final.

On 17 July 2013, Győr hosted Maccabi Tel Aviv F.C. and lost to 2–0 in the second qualifying round of the UEFA Champions League 2013-14 season. In the second tie Győr also lost 2–1 which resulted the early farewell of the club.

On 19 December 2013, Pintér resigned from his position after he was appointed as the head coach of the Hungary national team by the head of the Hungarian Football Federation, Sándor Csányi, in Telki.

After the 2014–15 season, the Hungarian Football Federation relegated Győr to the Nemzeti Bajnokság III due to financial reasons. The 2015–16 season would be the first one of Győr out of the top division. On 21 May 2017, the club won the league and therefore was promoted to the 2017–18 Nemzeti Bajnokság II.

On 22 June 2018, Géza Mészöly was appointed as the manager of the club. However, after a negative start Mészöly was quickly removed from his position.

== 2020s ==
On 24 February 2024, Serhiy Kuznetsov was appointed as the coach of the club.

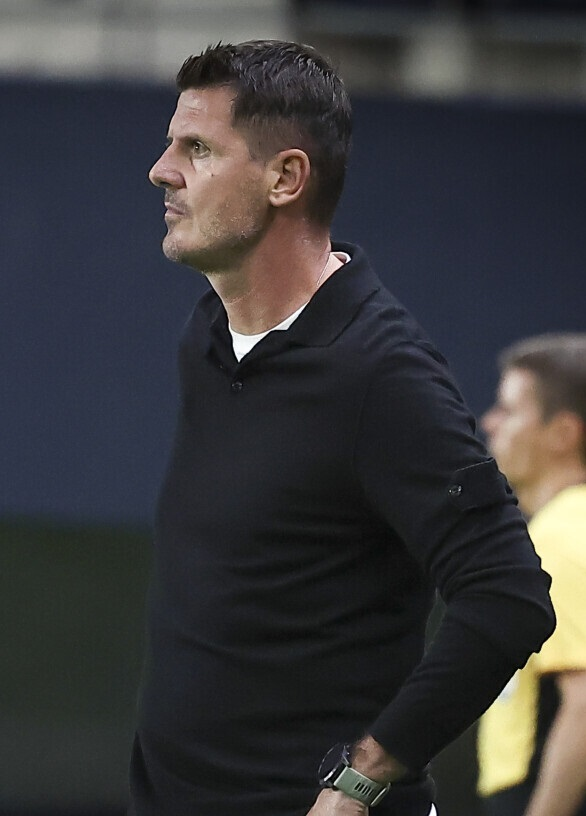
Balázs Borbély-led Győr were promoted to the first division in 2024 and won the Hungarian league in 2026

On 24 April 2024, Balázs Borbély was appointed head coach of Hungarian Nemzeti Bajnokság II side Győr, five matches before the end of the 2023–24 season. On 20 May 2024 Győr beat rivals Vasas at home 3–2 on the penultimate round of the 2023–24 Nemzeti Bajnokság II season. On the last match day, Győr beat Ajka 1–0 away on 25 May 2024. Finally, Győr finished in the second position of the 2023–24 Nemzeti Bajnokság II season and were promoted to the first division.

The return to the top flight did not start well for the club. On 26 July 2024, Győr were beaten by newly promoted Nyiregyháza 2–1 at the Mezőkövesdi Városi Stadion. On 2 August 2024, Győr were beaten by Debrecen 3–0 at home. On 11 August 2024, Győr were beaten by MTK Budapest 2–1 at home. On 16 August 2024, Győr lost to Kecskemét 2–1 at Széktói Stadion. On 24 August 2024, Győr signed Heitor from FCI Levadia Tallinn. On 31 August 2024, Győr collected their first point in the season by drawing with Diósgyőri VTK (0–0) at the Diósgyőri Stadion on game week 6. On 22 September 2024, they won their first match in the 2024–25 Nemzeti Bajnokság I season by beating Paksi FC 2–1 at home. Both goals were scored by Ahmed Nadhir Benbouali. Finally, Győr finished in the fourth position after their promotion to the first tier in 2024. The fourth position made Győr eligible for entering the 2025–26 UEFA Conference League qualifying phase.

In the second round of the 2025–26 UEFA Conference League qualifying phase, on 24 July 2025, Győr lost 2–1 to FC Pyunik at the Vazgen Sargsyan Republican Stadium, in Yerevan, Armenia. In the second, leg Győr beat Pyunik 3–1 at home and qualified for the third round. Although the result was equal on aggregate close to the end of the match thanks to two goals by Benbouali of Győr, and Ocansey of Pyunik, Štefulj scored the winning goal (on aggregate) in the 90th minute. In the third qualifying round, on 7 August 2025, Győr lost 2–1 to AIK Fotboll at the Nationalarenan, in Stockholm, Sweden. In the second leg, Győr beat AIK Fotboll 2–0 at home and qualified for the play-off. The goals were scored in the 34th minute by Gavrić and in the 60th minute by an own goal from Csongvai. Before the play-off match against SK Rapid Wien, Borbély said that the team should play in a way that the match in Vienna would be open for Győr. In the first leg of the play-off, Győr beat SK Rapid Wien 2–1 at home on 21 August 2025. Gavrić scored the first goal in the 46th minute, which was equalized by Wurmbrand in the 61st minute. However, Gavric scored the winning goal in the 82nd minute.

In June 2025, Győr received more than 300,000 pounds when former youth player Milos Kerkez was signed by Liverpool F.C..

Győr players lifts the 2025–26 Nemzeti Bajnokság I trophy on 17 May 2026.

In the 2025–26 Nemzeti Bajnokság I, Győr started with a 3–3 draw against Paksi FC on 27 July 2025. Győr's first victory was a historical win over MTK Budapest FC on 17 August 2025 at the Hidegkuti Nándor Stadion. Győr demolished MTK by 7–2. In the last round of the season, Győr was competing with the title-holders, Ferencváros to win the league. On 2 May 2026, Győr demolished Diósgyőr 4–0 at home. After the match, Borbély said that they were expecting Ferencváros to beat Újpest the following day. Ferencváros beat Újpest 5-0 at the Szusza Ferenc Stadion. Therefore, the title was decided on the last matchday. Although Ferencváros beat Zalaegerszeg 3–0 at home, Győr also beat Kisvárda FC 1–0 at the Várkerti Stadion on 16 May 2026. The only goal of the game was scored Nadhir Benbouali. Győr won their fifth leage title by winning the 2025–26 Nemzeti Bajnokság I. The following day the trophy was lifted by the champions at the ETO Park in front of 5000 fans. Győr's victory also meant that Ferencváros's seven consecutive wins was interrupted. In addition, Borbély-led Győr's title trophy also meant that a Hungarian coach won the title after 12 years.

In the 2025–26 Magyar Kupa season, Győr reached the semi-finals. They were eliminated by Ferencváros at the Groupama Arena on 22 April 2026. The match ended with a 2–2 draw and Ferencváros won 3–2 on penalties.

Balázs Borbély said that if the club does not sell key players, Győr can go far at European level. Győr will be unseeded in the draw for the 2026–27 UEFA Champions League qualifications. On 1 June 2026, Borbély resigned and signed a contract with rivals Ferencváros.

On 17 June 2026, Efraín Juárez, former manager of Pumas UNAM and Atlético Nacional, was appointed as the coach of the club. Juárez debuted with a 1–0 defeat from Víkingur Reykjavík at the Víkingsvöllur in Reykjavík in the first round of the 2026–27 UEFA Champions League qualifying. On 16 July 2026, Győr drew (2–2) with Vikingur at ETO Park and were eliminated from the Champions League. Győr continued their European campaign in the second round of the 2026–27 UEFA Conference League qualifying. On 21 July 2026, Győr beat FC Atert Bissen 6-2 at the Stade de Luxembourg in Luxembourg City. The second tie ended with a 1-1 draw at ETO Park. On 6 August 2026, the club sold Milán Vitális to AEK Athens F.C. for a club record transfer fee. In the third round, Győr lost 1-0 to Riga FC at the Skonto Stadium in Riga, Latvia, on 6 August 2026. Since the second tie ended with a 1-1 draw, Győr were eliminated from the European competitions. After the match Juaréz said that "From the 60th to the 70th minute, we couldn’t hold onto the ball; then there was the injury to Szabolcs Schön, who had just come on as a substitute, and Ádám Décsy’s cramp—we just couldn’t take control of the game at all. On Bumba’s play, we could have won the battle, but in the end, we conceded the goal. That’s just how it goes. I told the players not to regret anything because we gave it our all! This is a huge lesson for the club—we need to plan better; we don’t have enough depth on the roster. The Champions League, the Europa League, and the Conference League all come down to small details like this. The selection process, recovery—but also the little touches during the game. From now on, we need to focus on the league and the cup, but there are a lot of details we need to work on."
