= Attila Pintér (footballer, born 1966) =

Hungarian footballer and manager

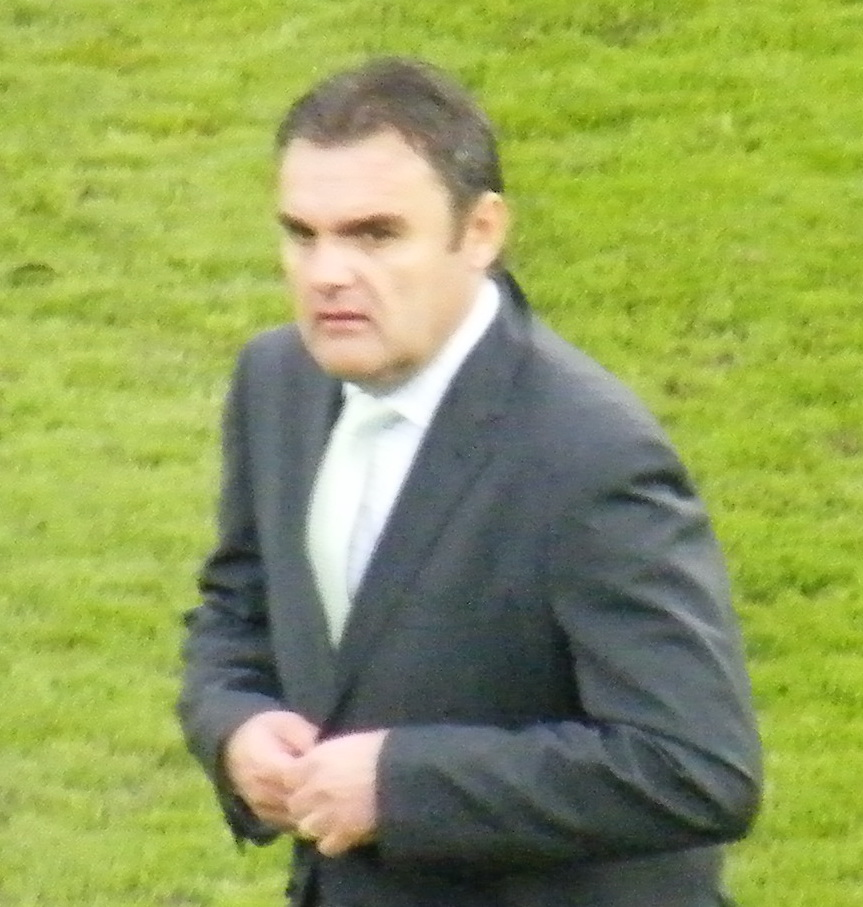
- Pintér in 2012

Personal information
- Date of birth: 7 May 1966 (age 60)
- Place of birth: Salgótarján, Hungary

Senior career*
Years	Team	Apps	(Gls)
1984–1989	Ferencváros	150	(20)
1990	Beerschot	13	(4)
1990–1991	Ferencváros	166	(16)
1991–1992	BVSC	25	(4)
1992	DAC Dunajská Streda		
1992	Budafok		
1993–1994	Győr	32	(11)
1994	Baja		
1995	Vasas		
1996	Diósgyőr		
Total		386	(55)

International career
1986–1991	Hungary	20	(3)

Managerial career
- 1994: Baja
- 1997–1999: Sárvár
- 2000–2002: Celldömölk
- 2002–2003: Pápa
- 2003: Sopron
- 2003–2004: Ferencváros
- 2004–2005: Sopron
- 2005–2006: Vasas
- 2009–2011: Győr
- 2012–2013: Győr
- 2013–2014: Hungary
- 2016: Mezőkövesd
- 2017–2018: Puskás Akadémia
- 2020–2021: Mezőkövesd
- 2022: III. Kerület
- 2024–: Vasas
- * Club domestic league appearances and goals

Attila Pintér (born 7 May 1966) is a Hungarian football manager and former player. He is best known for being the head coach of the Hungary national team from 19 December 2013 until 18 September 2014.

== Managerial career ==
=== Ferencváros ===
Pintér won the Hungarian League title with Ferencváros in the 2003–04 season. Pintér also could win the Hungarian Cup in 2004. He was dismissed from the club in 2004 after what was claimed to be a contract negotiation problem. Shortly after, the players of the club released a statement about Pintér's apparent behaviour during his tenure: according to the team, profanity, hazing, racist slurs and bullying was commonplace.

=== Sopron ===
Pintér won the Hungarian Cup in 2005 with Sopron.

=== Győr ===
Attila Pintér became the coach of the Győri ETO FC in 2009. During his coaching the team finished third in the Hungarian League 2009–10 season after beating Videoton FC in the last round. On international turf the team entered the Europa League 2010-11 season. In the first qualifying round Győr played their first match against FC Nitra. The final result was 2–2. In the second leg Attila Pintér's team could win 3–1 at the ETO Park. In the second qualifying round Győr played their first match in Kazakhstan against Atyrau. The match finished 2–0 to Győr thanks to the goals of Linas Pilibaitis and Fouad Bouguerra. In the second leg Győr could win 2–0. The goals were scored by Rati Aleksidze and Mihai Nicorec. In the third qualifying round Győr played with the French Montpellier HSC. The first match was played at the ETO Park and the final result was 1–0 to the French team. The only goal of the match was scored by Olivier Giroud. In the second leg Győr won 1–0. The only goal was scored by Valentin Babić. In extra time there were no more goals therefore the teams had to decide the match in the penalty shootout. Győr won 4–3 on penalties and entered the play-offs of the Europa League. Győr played the Croatian Dinamo Zagreb in the play-off of the Europa League 2010-11. The first match was won by Zagreb 2–0. In the second leg at the Stadion Maksimir Győr lost to 2–1 and were eliminated from the Europa League on 4–1 aggregate. Due to the increase of the number of matches the team were unable to do well both in the Hungarian League and in the Europa League. The results in the domestic league were not satisfying for the management, therefore Attila Pintér and the management mutually terminated the contract between each other and the management appointed Aurél Csertői as the manager.

On 12 May 2013, Attila Pintér's Győr ended a 30-year wait for the Hungarian League title by beating Ferencvárosi TC at home by 1–0, while their rival Videoton FC lost to Debreceni VSC 2–1 in the 27th weekday of the championship. In the 2012–13 season they went on a 22-match unbeaten run before back-to-back defeats knocked them off their stride. But neither Videoton FC nor MTK Budapest FC could sustain the challenge therefore Győr could wrap up their fourth title with room to spare.

On 22 May 2013, Pintér could have led Győr to double their success by winning the 2012–13 Magyar Kupa against Debreceni VSC at the Bozsik Stadion, Budapest. Győr was winning by 1–0 thanks to the goal by Nemanja Andrić in the 19th minute but in the second half Debrecen's Adamo Coulibaly scored two goals which resulted Debrecen's victory over Győr in the Hungarian Cup final.

=== Hungary ===
On 19 December 2013, Pintér was appointed as the head coach of the Hungary national team by the head of the Hungarian Football Federation, Sándor Csányi, in Telki. Some has seen this decision as controversial, given Pintér's low popularity with fans and players alike. On 7 September 2014, Hungary were defeated by Northern Ireland by 2–1 at the newly built Groupama Arena on the first matchday of the UEFA Euro 2016 qualifying. Pintér was subsequently dismissed, with Pál Dárdai appointed as a temporary replacement for three matches.

==== Szalai controversy ====
After the 8–1 defeat of the Hungary national side against the Netherlands, Szalai gave an interview about the reasons behind the long-term underachievement of the national side. Szalai has not been called up to play for Hungary since.

On 13 November 2013, Pintér reacted on Szalai's criticism and doubted Szalai's honesty. Pintér claimed that Szalai said in an interview before the 8–1 defeat that he does not have any problems with Hungary coach Sándor Egervári. Pintér criticised Szalai for being irresponsible for criticising the Hungarian coaches since Szalai does not know them.

On 5 March 2014, Hungary played their first match, ended in a 2–1 defeat, against Finland in Győr's ETO Park in the year and Szalai was left out. In an interview with Nemzeti Sport, Szalai said that he cannot say anything about his future with the national team since he was not invited and he did not have the option to decide whether to join or not.

On 28 August 2014, Pintér appointed the footballers of the Hungary national side against the upcoming UEFA Euro 2016 qualifier against Northern Ireland at the Groupama Arena on 7 September 2014. Szalai was left out from the team.

On 4 September 2014, Szalai posted an announcement on his Facebook profile saying that he doesn't want to play for Hungary during the management of Pintér. Szalai became the second Hungarian footballer in the past 20 years who resigned from the Hungary national side after the resignation of Szabolcs Huszti in 2007.

=== III. Kerület ===
On 13 April 2022, Pintér was appointed as manager of newly promoted and Nemzeti Bajnokság II side III. Kerület until the end of the season to avoid relegation.

=== Vasas ===
On 6 September 2024, he was appointed as the manager of Vasas SC. He debuted with a defeat against Nyíregyháza Spartacus FC in the 2024–25 Magyar Kupa season. Vasas lost to Nyíregyháza on penalties. On 10 November 2024, Vasas beat Békéscsaba 1912 Előre at Kórház utcai Stadion 2-0. This victory was Pintérs fourth consecutive win in the season. On 22 April 2025, it was confirmed that he would continue as a manager at the club despite the defeat against Mezőkövesdi SE on game week 23 and Budapesti VSC on game week 25.

== Honours ==
=== Player ===
Ferencváros

- Nemzeti Bajnokság I: 1988–89, 1990–91
- Magyar Kupa: 1990–91

=== Manager ===
Ferencváros

- Nemzeti Bajnokság I: 2003–04
- Magyar Kupa: 2003–04
- Szuperkupa: 2004

Sopron

- Magyar Kupa: 2004–05

Győr

- Nemzeti Bajnokság I: 2012–13
- Szuperkupa: 2013

=== International goals ===
Pintér – goals for Hungary
#	Date	Venue	Opponent	Score	Result	Competition
1.	11 October 1989	Népstadion, Budapest, Hungary	Spain	1–2	2–2	1990 FIFA World Cup qualification
2.	11 October 1989	Népstadion, Budapest, Hungary	Spain	2–2	2–2	1990 FIFA World Cup qualification
3.	28 March 1990	Népstadion, Budapest, Hungary	France	1–1	1–3	Friendly

== Managerial statistics ==
As of 4 September 2014

Team	Nat.	From	To	Record							
Team	Nat.	From	To	P	W	D	L	GF	GA	GD	W%
Ferencváros	(Hungary)	2003	2004	0	0	0	0	0	0	+0	—
Sopron	(Hungary)	2004	2005	0	0	0	0	0	0	+0	—
Vasas	(Hungary)			0	0	0	0	0	0	+0	—
Győr	(Hungary)	61 July 2009	5 March 2011	0	0	0	0	0	0	+0	—
Győr	(Hungary)	6 March 2012	19 December 2013	0	0	0	0	0	0	+0	—
Hungary	(Hungary)	19 December 2013		4	2	1	1	7	4	+3	50.0
Total				0	0	0	0	0	0	+0	—
