= Aleksandar Radosavljević =

Aleksandar Radosavljević may refer to:

- Aleksandar Radosavljević (footballer, born 1979), Slovenian football midfielder
- Aleksandar Radosavljević (footballer, born 1982), Serbian football goalkeeper
- Aleksandar Radosavljević, mixed martial artist, opponent of Jan Błachowicz
