= Vedran Nikšić =

Croatian footballer (born 1987)

Personal information
- Date of birth: 5 May 1987 (age 39)
- Place of birth: Osijek, SFR Yugoslavia
- Height: 1.83 m (6 ft 0 in)
- Position: Forward

Team information
- Current team: NK Tomislav Livana

Youth career
- Osijek

Senior career*
| Years | Team | Apps | (Gls) |
| 2006–2011 | Osijek | 80 | (22) |
| 2011 | Győri ETO | 3 | (0) |
| 2011 | Győri ETO II | 4 | (4) |
| 2011–2013 | Zagreb | 7 | (1) |
| 2015- | Tomislav | | |

International career^{‡}
| 2006 | Croatia U19 | 8 | (1) |
- * Club domestic league appearances and goals as of 5 November 2011 ‡ National team caps and goals as of 20 May 2006

Vedran Nikšić (born 5 May 1987) is a Croatian football striker, who plays for fifth-tier NK Tomislav Livana.

== Club career ==
Nikšić started his career playing at youth level for his hometown club Osijek. He made his debut for the first team against Cibalia on 11 March 2006, in the 22nd round of 2005–06 season. He was sidelined for the most part of the following season due to cruciate ligament injury. He managed to return for the second part of the season, and scored his first goal in Prva HNL in a 2–2 home draw against Cibalia. At the start of 2007–08 season, Nikšić scored a hat-trick in a 4–0 victory over Međimurje. He scored five more goals that year, before he again sustained cruciate ligament injury during the preparations for the second part of the season. He was out of action for a year and returned in spring 2009, scoring two goals in nine matches. In January 2011, Nikšić didn't agree on terms of his contract extension and joined Győri ETO as a free player, signing a four-and-a-half-year contract. After playing in only three games, his contract was terminated and on the last day of August 2011, Nikšić was signed by NK Zagreb. Nikšić went on to participate in 7 matches, scoring a single goal, before fading out for good from the first team. His 4-season contract was annulled in the summer of 2013, with reports of the club owing him a substantial amount of money, and has remained a free agent since (as of October 2014).

== Career stats ==
| Season | Club | League | Apps | Goals |
|---|---|---|---|---|
| 2005–06 | Osijek | Prva HNL | 9 | 0 |
| 2006–07 | Osijek | Prva HNL | 8 | 1 |
| 2007–08 | Osijek | Prva HNL | 18 | 8 |
| 2008–09 | Osijek | Prva HNL | 9 | 2 |
| 2009–10 | Osijek | Prva HNL | 25 | 8 |
| 2010–11 | Osijek | Prva HNL | 11 | 3 |
| 2010–11 | Győri ETO | Nemzeti Bajnokság I | 3 | 0 |
| 2011–12 | NK Zagreb | Prva HNL | 7 | 1 |

Last updated on 13 January 2012
