= Otto Szabó =

Slovak footballer

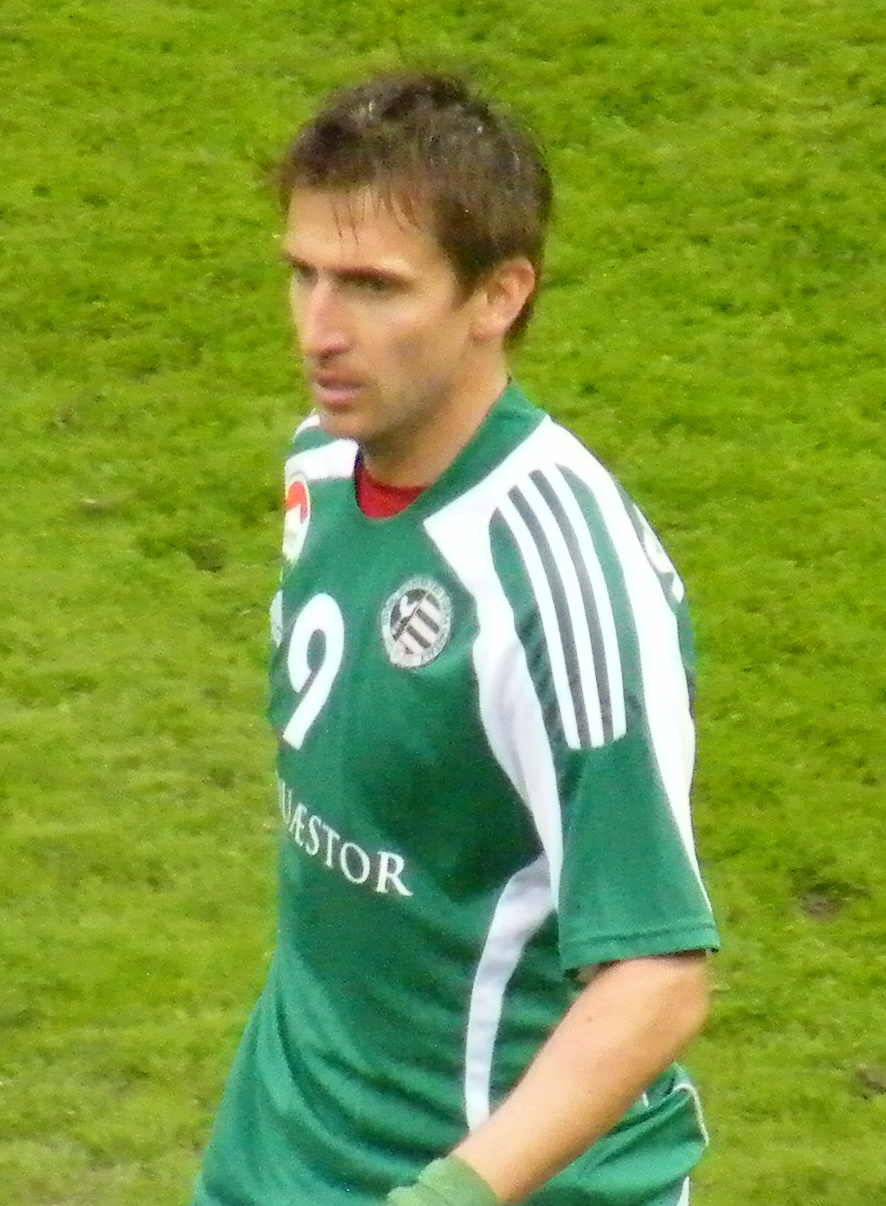
- Szabó in 2010

Personal information
- Date of birth: 1 March 1981 (age 45)
- Place of birth: Příbram, Czechoslovakia
- Height: 1.81 m (5 ft 11 in)
- Position: Left back

Team information
- Current team: Dunajská Streda
- Number: 28

Youth career
- 1995–1997: Dunajská Streda

Senior career*
Years	Team	Apps	(Gls)
1997–1999	Rapid Wien	5	(0)
2000–2001	Braunau	24	(1)
2001–2002	Rapid Wien	1	(0)
2000–2003	Rapid Wien II	19	(2)
2003–2004	MTK	24	(4)
2004–2005	Sopron	26	(1)
2005–2006	Debrecen	6	(0)
2005–2006	Vasas	15	(2)
2006–2007	Dunajská Streda	13	(0)
2007–2009	Slovan Bratislava	39	(4)
2008–2009	→ Petržalka (loan)	13	(0)
2009–2012	Győri ETO	46	(0)
2012–2013	Pápa	33	(0)
2014–2015	Dunajská Streda	38	(6)

International career^{‡}
2007–2009	Slovakia	3	(0)
- * Club domestic league appearances and goals as of 24 September 201 ‡ National team caps and goals as of 3 August 2009

Otto Szabó (Hungarian: Szabó Ottó; born 1 March 1981) is a Slovak football defender of Hungarian ethnicity. He currently plays for the club FK DAC 1904 Dunajská Streda.

Szabó played first international match for Slovakia against San Marino on 13 October 2007.
