= Ján Leško =

Slovak footballer

Personal information
- Full name: Ján Leško
- Date of birth: 6 July 1986 (age 40)
- Place of birth: Vranov nad Topľou, Czechoslovakia
- Height: 1.75 m (5 ft 9 in)
- Positions: Defender; midfielder

Team information
- Current team: TVEC85 Les Sables d'Olonne

Youth career
- Vranov nad Topľou

Senior career*
| Years | Team | Apps | (Gls) |
| – | Vranov nad Topľou | | |
| –2006 | Michalovce | | |
| 2006–2011 | Nitra | 54 | (1) |
| 2011 | →LAFC Lučenec loan | 11 | (3) |
| 2011–2012 | Opava | | |
- * Club domestic league appearances and goals as of 23 September 2013 ‡ National team caps and goals as of 3 April 2011

Ján Leško (born 6 July 1986 in Vranov nad Topľou) is a Slovak football defender who currently plays for TVEC85 Les Sables d'Olonne. He previously played for LAFC Lučenec, FC Nitra, MFK Zemplín Michalovce, MFK Vranov nad Topľou and SFC Opava
