= Ji-Paraná (footballer) =

Brazilian footballer

Personal information
- Full name: Júnior Felício Marques
- Date of birth: June 11, 1987 (age 39)
- Place of birth: Ji-Paraná, Brazil
- Height: 1.72 m (5 ft 7 1/2 in)
- Position: Midfielder

Youth career
- 2003–2004: Corinthians

Senior career*
Years	Team	Apps	(Gls)
2005–2006	Corinthians	4	(0)
2006–2010	Internacional	18	(0)
2009	→ Brasiliense (loan)	4	(0)
2010	→ Grêmio Prudente (loan)	0	(0)
2010–2012	Győr	42	(3)
2012–2013	Al Ittihad Kalba	14	(1)
2013–2014	Wacker Innsbruck	9	(1)
2014–2015	Al-Mina'a	14	(2)
2016–2017	Paranavaí	?	(?)
2017–2024	Ji-Paraná	?	(?)
2025–	Lupe o le Soaga	0	(0)

International career^{‡}
2007	Brazil U20	4	(0)
- * Club domestic league appearances and goals as of 28 May 2015 ‡ National team caps and goals as of 11 July 2007

Júnior Felício Marques or simply Ji-Paraná (born June 11, 1987 in Ji-Paraná), is a Brazilian midfielder who most recently played for Paranavaí.

== Career ==
=== Corinthians ===
Revealed in Corinthians youth categories, he played for the club in 2005 and 2006, making 7 appearances for the professional team.

=== Internacional ===
Ji joined Internacional from Corinthians on a 5-year contract from 23 October 2006. Inter later re-sold 45% economic rights to unknown parties for R$ 1million. Ji debuted for Inter in the Campeonato Gaucho in early 2007. On 16 March 2009 Inter loaned out the former Brazilian U-20 footballer to Campeonato Brasileiro Série B side Brasiliense. In August 2010 Junior Felício Marques moved to Hungarian side Győri ETO, one of the title contenders of the Hungarian premier league NB I. Internacional did not receive any fee but unknown fee was received by third parties owner.

== Honours ==
- Campeonato Brasileiro Série A: 2005.
- Copa São Paulo de Juniores: 2005.

== Contract ==
- 23 October 2006 to 22 October 2011
