= Teimuraz Sharashenidze =

Georgian footballer

Personal information
- Full name: Teimuraz Sharashenidze
- Date of birth: 21 January 1992 (age 34)
- Place of birth: Tbilisi, Georgia
- Height: 1.70 m (5 ft 7 in)
- Position: Forward

Team information
- Current team: Guria Lanchkhuti
- Number: 10

Senior career*
Years	Team	Apps	(Gls)
2009–2011	Győri ETO	6	(0)
2011–2012	Spartaki Tskhinvali	14	(2)
2012–2013	Chikhura Sachkhere	12	(2)
2013–2014	Guria Lanchkhuti	3	(0)
2014	Kolkheti-1913 Poti	10	(2)
2015	Bakhmaro Chokhatauri	12	(4)
2015	Mertskhali Ozurgeti	13	(1)
2016	Gardabani	9	(10)
2018	Bakhmaro Chokhatauri		
2019	Guria Lanchkhuti	18	(12)
2020–	Merani Martvili	2	(1)

International career
2010–2012	Georgia U21	6	(0)
- * Club domestic league appearances and goals as of 20:21, 26 May 2020 (UTC)

Teimuraz Sharashenidze (Georgian: თეიმურაზ შარაშენიძე; born 21 January 1992) is a Georgian football player who currently plays for FC Merani Martvili.
