= Giorgi Ganugrava =

Georgian footballer

Personal information
- Full name: Giorgi Ganugrava
- Date of birth: 21 February 1988 (age 38)
- Place of birth: Tbilisi, Georgian SSR, Soviet Union
- Height: 1.86 m (6 ft 1 in)
- Position: Midfielder

Team information
- Current team: Dinamo Batumi
- Number: 4

Senior career*
Years	Team	Apps	(Gls)
2003–2004	Ameri Tbilisi	25	(2)
2004–2008	Zestaponi	46	(1)
2008–2009	Mladá Boleslav	3	(0)
2009–2012	Győri ETO	16	(1)
2011	→ Lombard-Pápa (loan)	17	(1)
2012	→ Zalaegerszegi (loan)	12	(0)
2012–2013	Metalurgi Rustavi	7	(0)
2013–2014	Sioni Bolnisi	34	(2)
2015–2017	Chikhura Sachkhere	81	(5)
2018	Samtredia	3	(0)
2018–	Dinamo Batumi	8	(0)

International career^{‡}
2005–2010	Georgia U-21	14	(0)
2005–	Georgia	10	(0)
- * Club domestic league appearances and goals as of 21 May 2018 ‡ National team caps and goals as of 19 December 2017

Giorgi Ganugrava (Georgian: გიორგი განუგრავა; born 21 February 1988 in Tbilisi) is a Georgian footballer. He currently plays for FC Dinamo Batumi.

Ganugrava capped for Georgia in 2006 FIFA World Cup qualification (UEFA), he also played four friendlies in 2005 to 2006, and a non A friendly against Moldova U21.
