= Aleksandar Radosavljević (footballer, born 1982) =

Serbian footballer

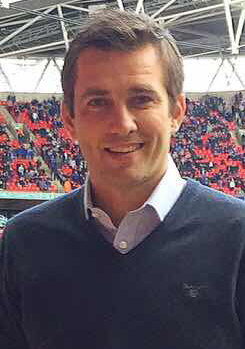
- Radosavljević in 2016

Personal information
- Full name: Aleksandar Radosavljević
- Date of birth: 21 December 1982 (age 43)
- Place of birth: Kraljevo, SFR Yugoslavia
- Height: 1.90 m (6 ft 3 in)
- Position: Goalkeeper

Senior career*
Years	Team	Apps	(Gls)
2002–2007	Čukarički	92	(0)
2007–2010	Partizan	5	(0)
2010–2011	Győr	3	(0)
2010–2011	→ Győr II (loan)	6	(0)
2012–2013	Serbian White Eagles	0	(0)
Total		106	(0)
- * Club domestic league appearances and goals

Aleksandar Radosavljević (Serbian Cyrillic: Александар Радосављевић; born 21 December 1982) is a Serbian former professional footballer who played as a goalkeeper.

== Career ==
Radosavljević started out at Čukarički, playing six years with the club.

He moved to Partizan in June 2007, agreeing to a four-year deal. As the third-string keeper behind Darko Božović and starter Mladen Božović, Radosavljević saw limited action. He briefly got a chance as first-string keeper under head coach Goran Stevanović between late September and early November 2009 (including three Europa League matches against Shakhtar Donetsk and Club Brugge), after which Mladen Božović again became Partizan's undisputed first-choice goalkeeper. Radosavljević spent three seasons with Partizan and won five trophies, before being released by mutual consent on 31 August 2010 after qualifying with the team for the 2010–11 Champions League.

Shortly after, Radosavljević moved abroad and signed with Hungarian club Győr, staying there until the end of the 2010–11 season. In 2012, he signed a one-year contract with the Serbian White Eagles in the Canadian Soccer League but did not feature in any games.

== Honours ==
Partizan

- Serbian SuperLiga: 2007–08, 2008–09, 2009–10
- Serbian Cup: 2007–08, 2008–09
