= Juan Ignacio Briones =

Argentine footballer

Personal information
- Full name: Juan Ignacio Briones
- Date of birth: January 16, 1986 (age 40)
- Place of birth: Mar del Plata, Argentina
- Height: 1.75 m (5 ft 9 in)
- Position: Midfielder

Youth career
- 2003 – 2006: Central Córdoba
- 2007: Club Atlético Aldosivi

Senior career*
Years	Team	Apps	(Gls)
2007–2010	Club Atlético Aldosivi	52	(1)
2010–2011	Győri ETO FC	1	(0)
2011–2012	Deportes Concepción	7	(1)
2012–2013	Gimnasia de Mendoza	25	(1)
2014–2015	Independiente de Fontana	13	(1)
2015	General Díaz	2	(0)
2017	Kimberley	14	(0)
- * Club domestic league appearances and goals as of 1 January 2018

Juan Ignacio Briones (born 16 January 1986 in Mar del Plata) is an Argentine footballer who played for Győri ETO FC.

== Career ==
The right midfielder began his professional career in Spring 2007 with Club Atlético Aldosivi and signed in August 2010 for Győri ETO FC.
