= Nicolas Ceolin =

Brazilian footballer

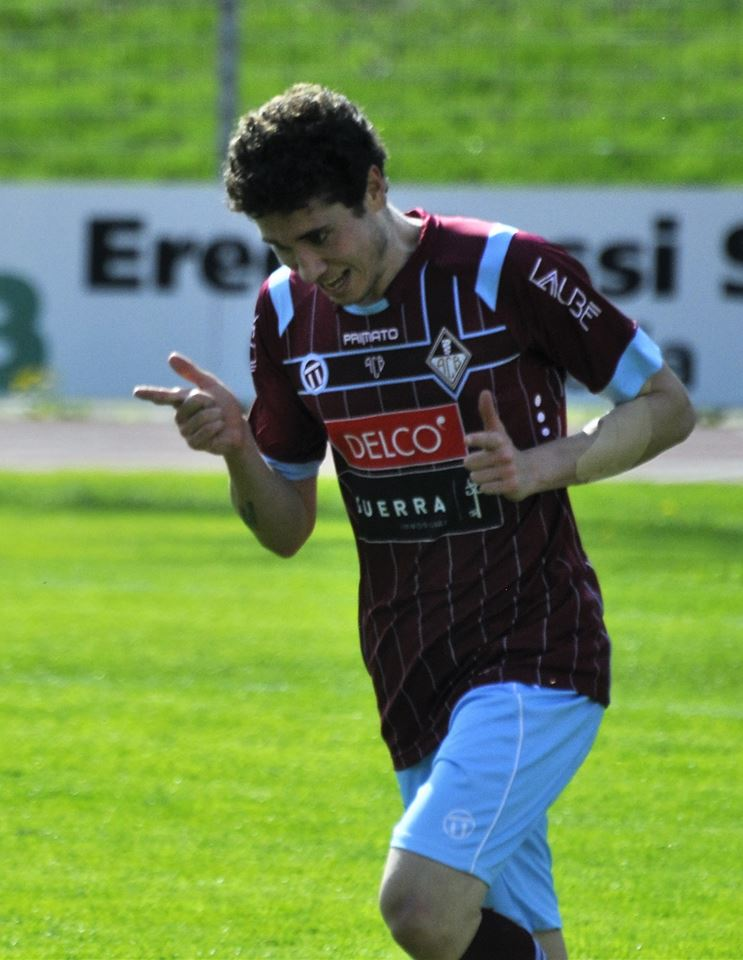

Personal information
- Full name: Nicolas Ceolin
- Date of birth: 10 April 1986 (age 40)
- Place of birth: Passo Fundo, Brazil
- Height: 1.84 m (6 ft 0 in)
- Positions: Attacking midfielder; forward

Youth career
- Gaúcho-RS
- Ipiranga-RS
- Vitoria-Bahia

Senior career*
Years	Team	Apps	(Gls)
2002–2003	Vitória		
2003–2004	Catuense		
2004–2005	Vitória		
2005–2006	União Barbarense		
2006–2008	Darida Minsk Raion	22	(6)
2008–2009	MTZ-RIPO Minsk	34	(11)
2009–2010	→ Neman Grodno (loan)	11	(1)
2010–2012	Győri ETO	22	(3)
2012	→ Budapest Honvéd (loan)	5	(1)
2012–2013	Pécs	2	(1)
2013	Neman Grodno	13	(1)
2013–2014	Verbania	9	(3)
2014	Bra	9	(0)
2015	Olympia Agnonese	2	(0)
2015–2016	Bellinzona	15	(5)
2017–2018	US Arbedo		
2019–2020	FC OS Lusiadas		
2020	FC Ascona		
- * Club domestic league appearances and goals as of 31 December 2018

Nicolas Ceolin (born 10 April 1986) is a Brazilian former footballer.

== Career ==
Ceolin started in football at Gaúcho, playing for other Rio Grande do Sul-based youth clubs until he was transferred to EC Vitoria.
