= Roman Sloboda =

Slovak footballer

Personal information
- Full name: Roman Sloboda
- Date of birth: 14 January 1987 (age 39)
- Place of birth: Myjava, Czechoslovakia
- Height: 1.78 m (5 ft 10 in)
- Position: Attacking midfielder

Team information
- Current team: Veľké Lovce
- Number: 11

Youth career
- Nitra

Senior career*
Years	Team	Apps	(Gls)
2006–2011	Nitra	72	(4)
2010	→ Zlaté Moravce (loan)	10	(3)
2012	Zagłębie Lubin	2	(1)
2013	Mladá Boleslav	9	(0)
2013–2014	Bohemians Střížkov	19	(5)
2014	Galanta	15	(16)
2015	UFC Purbach am See	13	(5)
2015–2016	USC Wallern	31	(15)
2016–2018	ASV Steinbrunn	50	(31)
2018–2019	USV Halbturn	25	(10)
2019–	Veľké Lovce		

Managerial career
- 2021–: Veľké Lovce (player-manager)
- * Club domestic league appearances and goals as of 14 January 2024

Roman Sloboda (born 14 January 1987) is a Slovak footballer who plays as a midfielder. He is the playing manager of 5. Liga club Veľké Lovce.
