= Rati Aleksidze =

Georgian footballer

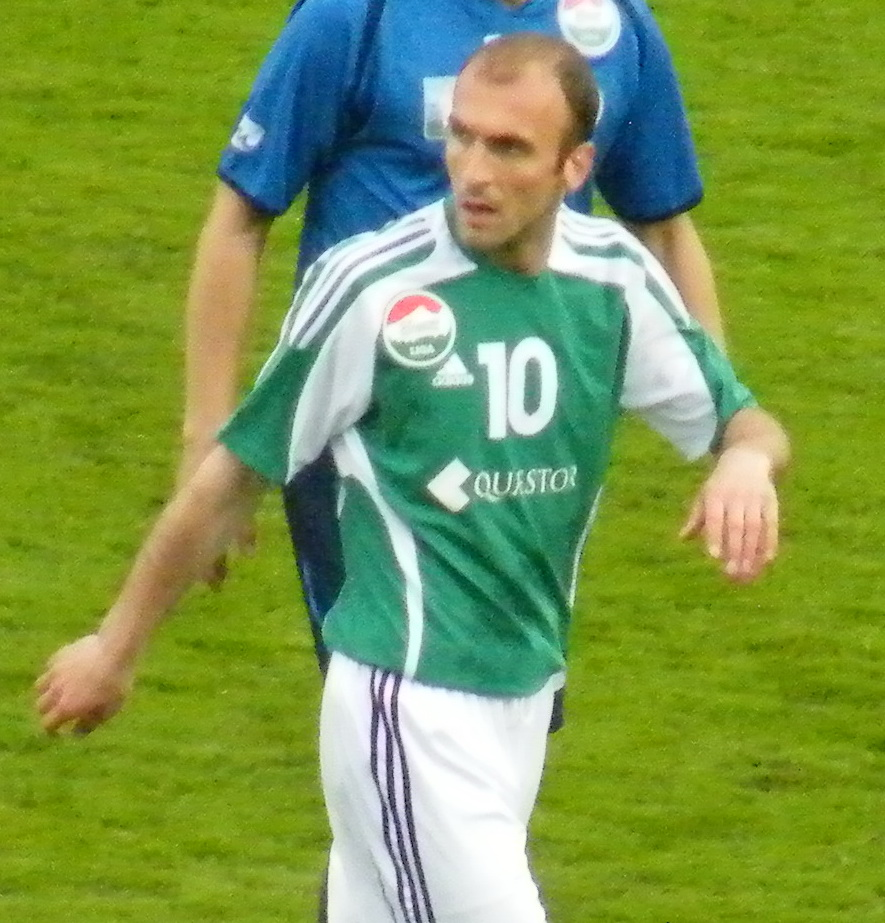

Personal information
- Full name: Rati Aleksidze
- Date of birth: 3 August 1978 (age 48)
- Place of birth: Tbilisi, Georgian SSR
- Height: 1.82 m (5 ft 11 1/2 in)
- Position: Striker

Youth career
- Dinamo Tbilisi

Senior career*
Years	Team	Apps	(Gls)
1996–1999	Dinamo Tbilisi	71	(33)
1999–2001	Chelsea	2	(0)
2002–2003	Dinamo Tbilisi	36	(17)
2004	Rostov	9	(0)
2008–2009	Lokomotiv Tbilisi	23	(15)
2009–2012	Győri ETO	86	(23)
2012–2014	FC Dila Gori		(0)

International career
1993–1995	Georgia U-17	19	(5)
1997–1998	Georgia U-21	19	(2)
1998–2009	Georgia	28	(2)
- * Club domestic league appearances and goals

Rati Aleksidze (Georgian: რატი ალექსიძე; born 3 August 1978 in Tbilisi, Georgia) is a former football striker from Georgia.

== Career ==
His club career started in Dinamo Tbilisi in the 1996/97 season. His goal-scoring abilities helped them win the league titles in 1997, 1998 and 1999 as well as the 1997 cup. During his Dinamo career Aleksidze scored 33 goals in 71 appearances, and especially the 12 goals in 14 games in the 1999/00 season attracted the interest of bigger European clubs. He was taken on trial to English team Chelsea, who decided to buy him. Aleksidze found first team opportunities at Chelsea hard to come by, however, as he only played in two league games and one European match, all as substitute. Released by Chelsea in September 2001, he eventually returned to Dinamo where he scored nine goals in his first season. In 2004, he was bought by Russian team FC Rostov, then retired from his professional career and returned to Georgia. In July 2008 he made a comeback, playing for FC Lokomotivi Tbilisi. Then in January 2009 he joined the Hungarian club Győri ETO FC.

== International ==
Due to career difficulties he lost his place on the national team, for which he scored 2 goals in 19 caps between 1998 and 2004.
