= Onișor Nicorec =

Romanian footballer

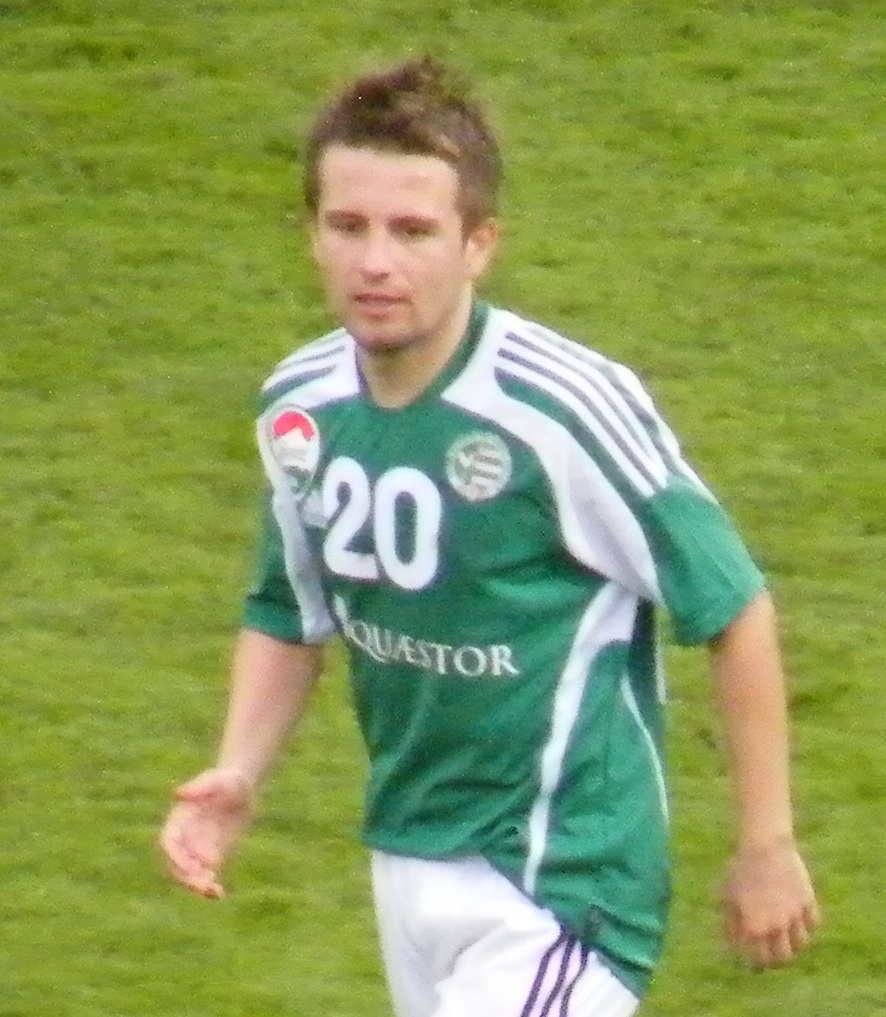

Personal information
- Full name: Onișor Mihai Nicorec
- Date of birth: 28 March 1986 (age 40)
- Place of birth: Târgu Lăpuş, Romania
- Height: 1.72 m (5 ft 7 1/2 in)
- Position: Right midfielder

Team information
- Current team: Universitatea Oradea
- Number: 22

Senior career*
Years	Team	Apps	(Gls)
2004–2009	Rapid II București	20	(0)
2008–2009	→ Minerul Lupeni (loan)	48	(5)
2009–2015	Győri ETO	37	(5)
2009–2015	→ Győri ETO II	5	(1)
2012	→ Zalaegerszeg (loan)	10	(0)
2012–2014	→ Győri ETO II	11	(3)
2015	Farul Constanța	11	(1)
2016–2017	Mezőkövesd	19	(3)
2017	Cigánd	13	(1)
2017–2018	Szeged	20	(1)
2018–2022	Universitatea Oradea	53	(5)
Total		247	(25)
- * Club domestic league appearances and goals as of 2 October 2018

Onișor Mihai Nicorec (born 28 March 1986) is a Romanian football player who currently plays for Liga IV side Universitatea Oradea. Nicorec played in his career mostly for Hungarian clubs, among others: Győri ETO, Zalaegerszeg and Mezőkövesd, but he played also in Romania for: Rapid II București, Minerul Lupeni and Farul Constanța.

== Honours ==
=== Club ===
Győri ETO FC

- Nemzeti Bajnokság I: 2012–13
