= Fouad Bouguerra =

Algerian footballer (born 1981)

Personal information
- Date of birth: 7 May 1981 (age 45)
- Place of birth: Montélimar, France
- Height: 1.83 m (6 ft 0 in)
- Position: Forward

Youth career
- 1999–2003: UMS Montélimar

Senior career*
Years	Team	Apps	(Gls)
2003–2004	US Millery Vourles	19	(15)
2004–2005	Nantes B	56	(18)
2005–2006	Nantes	5	(0)
2006–2007	Club Africain	21	(14)
2007–2009	USM Annaba	28	(6)
2009–2010	JSM Béjaïa	5	(0)
2010	Nyíregyháza Spartacus	12	(10)
2010–2012	Győri ETO FC	20	(3)
2011–2012	→ CS Constantine (loan)	19	(4)
2012	CS Constantine	20	(9)
2013	MC Oran	9	(0)

International career
2006–2007	Algeria	2	(0)
- * Club domestic league appearances and goals

Fouad Bouguerra (Arabic: فؤاد بوقرة; born 7 May 1981) is a former professional footballer who played as a forward. Born in France, he represented Algeria at international level.

== Career ==
Bouguerra played for UMS Montélimar, US Millery Vourles and Nantes in France, for Tunisian team Club Africain and in the Algerian Championnat National for USM Annaba, JSM Bejaïa and MC Oran.

On 28 February 2010, Bouguerra made his league debut for Nyíregyháza Spartacus in a 3–2 win over Vasas SC.
