= Valentin Babić =

Croatian footballer (born 1981)

Personal information
- Full name: Valentin Babić
- Date of birth: 6 July 1981 (age 45)
- Place of birth: Osijek, SR Croatia, SFR Yugoslavia
- Height: 1.74 m (5 ft 8 1/2 in)
- Position: Defender

Senior career*
Years	Team	Apps	(Gls)
2003–2004	Virovitica	14	(8)
2004–2009	Osijek	140	(10)
2009–2012	Győri ETO	49	(2)
2013–2014	Osijek	12	(0)
2014–2015	Győri ETO		
2015–2016	NK Tomislav Livana		
2016–2017	NK Grafičar Vodovod		
2017–2018	NK Vardarac		
2018–2020	Hajduk Wiesbaden		
2020–2021	Croatia Frankfurt	6	(1)
- * Club domestic league appearances and goals as of 6 May 2012

Valentin Babić (born 6 July 1981) is a Croatian retired football defender, who primarily played for NK Osijek.

== Club career ==
He also had a spell in Germany with amateur sides Hajduk Wiesbaden and Croatia Frankfurt.
