= Aurél Csertői =

Hungarian footballer and manager

Personal information
- Full name: Aurél Csertői
- Date of birth: 25 September 1965 (age 61)
- Place of birth: Győr, Hungary
- Height: 1.76 m (5 ft 9 1/2 in)
- Position: Midfielder

Senior career*
Years	Team	Apps	(Gls)
1988–1990	Szombathelyi Haladás	38	(8)
1993–1995	Győri ETO	88	(24)
1995–1998	MTK Hungária FC	45	(12)
1998	Budapest Honvéd FC	10	(1)

International career
1993–1995	Hungary	11	(1)

Managerial career
- 2003: Győri ETO FC
- 2003–2004: Balaton FC
- 2004–2006: Videoton
- 2006–2007: FC Sopron
- 2007–2009: Szombathelyi Haladás
- 2009–2010: Kecskeméti TE
- 2010–2010: Szombathelyi Haladás
- 2011–2012: Győri ETO FC
- 2012–2013: FC Tatabánya
- 2014–2019: Paks
- 2019–2023: Gyirmót FC
- 2023–2024: Budapest Honvéd
- 2024–: Mezőkövesdi SE
- * Club domestic league appearances and goals

Aurél Csertői (born 25 September 1965 in Győr) is a Hungarian football player and manager.

== Coaching career ==
=== FC Fehérvár (Videoton FC) (2004-2006) ===
Csertői won a bronze medal in the Hungarian National Championship I 2005-06 season.

=== Haladás (2007-2009) ===
Csertői won a bronze medal in the Hungarian National Championship I 2008–09 season with the West Hungarian team, called Haladás Szombathely. As a consequence, his team could play in the Europa League 2009-10 season. In the first round Haladás Szombathely beat FC Irtysh Pavlodar 1–0 at home and they were defeated 2–1 away. In the second round Aurél Csertői's team played against the Swedish IF Elfsborg and they drew at home (0-0), but lost in Sweden 3-0 and they were eliminated from the Europa League 2009-10.

=== Győri ETO ===
In 2011 Aurél Csertői was appointed as the manager of the Győri ETO FC.
