= 2013–14 Győri ETO FC season =

Győri ETO FC
2013–14 season
- Chairman: Csaba Tarsoly
- Manager: Attila Pintér (until 19 December 2013); Ferenc Horváth
- NB 1: Runners-up
- Hungarian Cup: Quarter-final
- Hungarian League Cup: Round of 16
- UEFA Champions League: Second Qualifying Round
- Super Cup: Winner
- Top goalscorer: League: Gergely Rudolf (7); Nemanja Andrić (7); Máté Pátkai (7); All: Gergely Rudolf (13)
- Highest home attendance: 8,175 vs Maccabi Tel Aviv (17 July 2013)
- Lowest home attendance: 200 vs Tatabánya (13 November 2013)
Home colours	Away colours

The 2013–14 season will be Győri ETO FC's 70th competitive season, 54th consecutive season in the OTP Bank Liga and 109th year in existence as a football club. Győr is defending champions.

== First team squad ==
Note: Flags indicate national team as defined under FIFA eligibility rules; some limited exceptions apply. Players may hold more than one non-FIFA nationality.

No.	Pos.	Nation	Player
1	GK	HUN	Krisztián Pogacsics
2	DF	HUN	Ákos Takács
3	MF	CRO	Marko Dinjar
4	DF	SRB	Lazar Stanišić
5	MF	CMR	Patrick Mevoungou
6	DF	SVK	Marián Had
7	MF	HUN	Bence Mervó
8	MF	HUN	Ádám Dudás
9	MF	SVN	Rok Kronaveter
10	FW	ITA	Leandro Martínez
11	FW	HUN	Roland Varga
12	MF	SRB	Nikola Trajković
13	MF	HUN	Zsolt Kalmár
14	FW	HUN	Gergely Rudolf
15	DF	HUN	Dániel Völgyi

No.	Pos.	Nation	Player
16	DF	HUN	Zoltán Lipták
17	MF	HUN	Máté Pátkai
18	DF	HUN	Ádám Lang
19	MF	SRB	Nemanja Andrić
21	MF	CZE	Marek Střeštík
22	MF	CZE	Michal Švec
24	MF	BIH	Đorđe Kamber
25	DF	JAM	Rafe Wolfe
26	GK	SVK	Ľuboš Kamenár
27	GK	HUN	Gergely Nagy
28	DF	SRB	Vladimir Đorđević
29	MF	HUN	Tamás Koltai
30	FW	SLV	Rafael Burgos
31	MF	HUN	Dávid Illés

== Transfers ==
=== Summer ===
In: Note: Flags indicate national team as defined under FIFA eligibility rules; some limited exceptions apply. Players may hold more than one non-FIFA nationality.

No.	Pos.	Nation	Player
5	MF	CMR	Patrick Mevoungou (from (Austria) Admira Wacker)
7	FW	HUN	János Lázok (loan from Paks)
10	FW	ITA	Leandro Martínez (from Honvéd)
14	FW	HUN	Gergely Rudolf (from Diósgyőr)
14	MF	HUN	Máté Kiss (loan return from Siófok)
18	MF	HUN	József Windecker (loan return from Siófok)
19	FW	HUN	András Simon (loan return from Szombathely)
25	DF	JAM	Rafe Wolfe (from MTK)
26	DF	HUN	Bence Zámbó (loan return from Kaposvár)
30	FW	SLV	Rafael Burgos (loan from (El Salvador) Alianza)

Out: Note: Flags indicate national team as defined under FIFA eligibility rules; some limited exceptions apply. Players may hold more than one non-FIFA nationality.

No.	Pos.	Nation	Player
5	DF	SVK	Marián Had
10	FW	GEO	Rati Aleksidze (to (Georgia (country)) Dila Gori)
14	MF	HUN	Máté Kiss (loan to Mezőkövesd)
14	MF	LTU	Linas Pilibaitis (loan to Mezőkövesd)
18	MF	HUN	József Windecker (loan to Paks)
19	FW	HUN	András Simon (to Győr II)
22	DF	CRO	Valentin Babić (to (Croatia) Osijek)
25	FW	GEO	Giorgi Kvilitaia (to (Georgia (country)) Dila Gori)
25	FW	EST	Jarmo Ahjupera (to Újpest)
26	DF	HUN	Bence Zámbó (to Kaposvár)
27	GK	HUN	Péter Nacsa (loan to Kisvárda)
30	GK	SVK	Péter Molnár (to Paks)

=== Winter ===
In: Note: Flags indicate national team as defined under FIFA eligibility rules; some limited exceptions apply. Players may hold more than one non-FIFA nationality.

No.	Pos.	Nation	Player
14	MF	LTU	Linas Pilibaitis (loan return from Mezőkövesd)
—	GK	HUN	Krisztián Pogacsics (loan from (Romania) Bihor Oradea)

Out: Note: Flags indicate national team as defined under FIFA eligibility rules; some limited exceptions apply. Players may hold more than one non-FIFA nationality.

No.	Pos.	Nation	Player
1	GK	SRB	Saša Stevanović (end of career)
6	MF	EST	Tarmo Kink (loan return to (Italy) Varese)
14	MF	LTU	Linas Pilibaitis (to (Lithuania) Žalgiris Vilnius)
19	FW	HUN	András Simon (loan to Kecskemét)
23	DF	HUN	Tibor Tokody (end of career)

- List of Hungarian football transfers summer 2013
- List of Hungarian football transfers winter 2013–14

== Statistics ==
=== Appearances and goals ===
Last updated on 1 June 2014.

No.	Pos	Nat	Player	Total		OTP Bank Liga		Champions League		Hungarian Cup		League Cup	
No.	Pos	Nat	Player	Apps	Goals	Apps	Goals	Apps	Goals	Apps	Goals	Apps	Goals
1	GK	(Hungary) HUN	Krisztián Pogacsics	2	-3	1	0	0	0	0	0	1	-3
2	DF	(Hungary) HUN	Ákos Takács	2	0	0	0	2	0	0	0	0	0
3	MF	(Croatia) CRO	Marko Dinjar	25	1	16	0	1	0	5	1	3	0
4	DF	(Serbia) SRB	Lazar Stanišić	7	1	1	0	0	0	0	0	6	1
5	MF	(Cameroon) CMR	Patrick Mevoungou	24	0	17	0	1	0	2	0	4	0
6	DF	(Slovakia) SVK	Marián Had	4	0	2	0	0	0	1	0	1	0
7	MF	(Hungary) HUN	Bence Mervó	1	0	1	0	0	0	0	0	0	0
8	MF	(Hungary) HUN	Ádám Dudás	11	1	9	0	0	0	0	0	2	1
9	MF	(Slovenia) SVN	Rok Kronaveter	25	4	15	2	1	0	3	0	6	2
10	FW	(Italy) ITA	Leandro Martínez	27	8	17	4	2	1	3	0	5	3
11	FW	(Hungary) HUN	Roland Varga	39	8	28	4	2	0	4	1	5	3
12	MF	(Serbia) SRB	Nikola Trajković	26	4	18	4	2	0	0	0	6	0
13	MF	(Hungary) HUN	Zsolt Kalmár	26	2	21	2	0	0	3	0	2	0
14	FW	(Hungary) HUN	Gergely Rudolf	24	13	16	7	0	0	4	1	4	5
15	DF	(Hungary) HUN	Dániel Völgyi	16	3	13	1	1	0	0	0	2	2
16	DF	(Hungary) HUN	Zoltán Lipták	32	4	25	4	2	0	3	0	2	0
17	MF	(Hungary) HUN	Máté Pátkai	33	9	23	7	1	0	5	1	4	1
18	DF	(Hungary) HUN	Ádám Lang	28	1	24	1	0	0	3	0	1	0
19	MF	(Serbia) SRB	Nemanja Andrić	41	10	29	7	2	0	5	2	5	1
21	MF	(Czech Republic) CZE	Marek Střeštík	27	6	18	4	2	0	4	2	3	0
22	MF	(Czech Republic) CZE	Michal Švec	25	0	19	0	1	0	2	0	3	0
24	MF	(Bosnia and Herzegovina) BIH	Đorđe Kamber	37	2	28	2	2	0	4	0	3	0
25	DF	(Jamaica) JAM	Rafe Wolfe	24	3	14	3	1	0	3	0	6	0
26	GK	(Slovakia) SVK	Ľuboš Kamenár	38	-39	27	-25	2	-4	5	-7	4	-3
27	GK	(Hungary) HUN	Gergely Nagy	3	-2	1	-1	0	0	0	0	2	-1
28	DF	(Serbia) SRB	Vladimir Đorđević	12	2	4	1	0	0	3	1	5	0
29	MF	(Hungary) HUN	Tamás Koltai	8	1	6	1	2	0	0	0	0	0
30	FW	(El Salvador) SLV	Rafael Burgos	20	4	9	1	0	0	4	0	7	3
31	MF	(Hungary) HUN	Dávid Illés	3	0	1	0	0	0	1	0	1	0
Youth players:
20	MF	(Romania) ROU	Mihai Nicorec	4	1	0	0	0	0	0	0	4	1
31	FW	(Hungary) HUN	János Sipőcz	1	0	0	0	0	0	0	0	1	0
31	FW	(Hungary) HUN	Viktor Pongrácz	1	0	0	0	0	0	0	0	1	0
32	MF	(Hungary) HUN	Imre Vankó	1	0	0	0	0	0	0	0	1	0
33	DF	(Hungary) HUN	Bálint Nagy	1	0	0	0	0	0	0	0	1	0
34	MF	(Slovakia) SVK	Sinan Medgyes	2	0	0	0	0	0	0	0	2	0
35	FW	(Hungary) HUN	Dániel Fekete	1	0	0	0	0	0	0	0	1	0
35	DF	(Hungary) HUN	Ádám Nagy	1	0	0	0	0	0	0	0	1	0
Players no longer at the club:
1	GK	(Serbia) SRB	Saša Stevanović	4	-8	3	-6	0	0	0	0	1	-2
6	MF	(Estonia) EST	Tarmo Kink	9	1	8	1	1	0	0	0	0	0
7	MF	(Hungary) HUN	János Lázok	14	2	6	1	0	0	3	0	5	1

=== Top scorers ===
Includes all competitive matches. The list is sorted by shirt number when total goals are equal.

Last updated on 1 June 2014

Position	Nation	Number	Name	OTP Bank Liga	Hungarian Cup	Champions League	League Cup	Total
1	(Hungary)	14	Gergely Rudolf	7	0	1	5	13
2	(Serbia)	19	Nemanja Andrić	7	0	2	1	10
3	(Hungary)	17	Máté Pátkai	7	0	1	1	9
4	(Italy)	10	Leandro Martínez	4	1	0	3	8
5	(Hungary)	11	Roland Varga	4	0	1	3	8
6	(Czech Republic)	21	Marek Střeštík	4	0	2	0	6
7	(Hungary)	16	Zoltán Lipták	4	0	0	0	4
8	(Serbia)	12	Nikola Trajković	4	0	0	0	4
9	(Slovenia)	9	Rok Kronaveter	2	0	0	2	4
10	(El Salvador)	30	Rafael Burgos	1	0	0	3	4
11	(Jamaica)	25	Rafe Wolfe	3	0	0	0	3
12	(Hungary)	15	Dániel Völgyi	1	0	0	2	3
13	(Bosnia and Herzegovina)	24	Đorđe Kamber	2	0	0	0	2
14	(Hungary)	13	Zsolt Kalmár	2	0	0	0	2
15	(Serbia)	28	Vladimir Đorđević	1	0	1	0	2
16	(Hungary)	7	János Lázok	1	0	0	1	2
17	(Estonia)	6	Tarmo Kink	1	0	0	0	1
18	(Hungary)	29	Tamás Koltai	1	0	0	0	1
19	(Hungary)	18	Ádám Lang	1	0	0	0	1
20	(Croatia)	3	Marko Dinjar	0	0	1	0	1
21	(Serbia)	4	Lazar Stanišić	0	0	0	1	1
22	(Hungary)	8	Ádám Dudás	0	0	0	1	1
23	(Romania)	20	Mihai Nicorec	0	0	0	1	1
/	/	/	Own Goals	1	0	1	0	2
			TOTALS	58	1	10	24	93

=== Disciplinary record ===
Includes all competitive matches. Players with 1 card or more included only.

Last updated on 1 June 2014

Position	Nation	Number	Name	OTP Bank Liga		Champions League		Hungarian Cup		League Cup		Total (Hu Total)	
Position	Nation	Number	Name	Booked	Sent off (straight red)	Booked	Sent off (straight red)	Booked	Sent off (straight red)	Booked	Sent off (straight red)	Booked	Sent off (straight red)
MF	(Croatia)	3	Marko Dinjar	4	0	0	0	0	0	0	0	4 (4)	0 (0)
DF	(Serbia)	4	Lazar Stanišić	1	0	0	0	0	0	2	0	3 (1)	0 (0)
MF	(Cameroon)	5	Patrick Mevoungou	5	0	1	0	1	0	2	0	9 (5)	0 (0)
MF	(Estonia)	6	Tarmo Kink	1	0	0	0	0	0	0	0	1 (1)	0 (0)
DF	(Slovakia)	6	Marián Had	0	0	0	0	0	0	0	1	0 (0)	1 (0)
MF	(Hungary)	7	János Lázok	0	0	0	0	1	0	0	0	1 (0)	0 (0)
MF	(Slovenia)	9	Rok Kronaveter	1	0	0	0	0	0	2	0	3 (1)	0 (0)
FW	(Italy)	10	Leandro Martínez	3	0	0	0	1	0	2	0	6 (3)	0 (0)
FW	(Hungary)	11	Roland Varga	2	0	0	0	0	0	1	0	3 (2)	0 (0)
MF	(Serbia)	12	Nikola Trajković	6	0	0	0	0	0	0	0	6 (6)	0 (0)
MF	(Hungary)	13	Zsolt Kalmár	5	0	0	0	2	0	2	0	9 (5)	0 (0)
FW	(Hungary)	14	Gergely Rudolf	3	0	0	0	0	0	0	0	3 (3)	0 (0)
DF	(Hungary)	15	Dániel Völgyi	5	1	0	0	0	0	0	0	5 (5)	1 (1)
DF	(Hungary)	16	Zoltán Lipták	8	1	2	0	0	0	2	0	12 (8)	1 (1)
MF	(Hungary)	17	Máté Pátkai	9	1	1	0	2	0	0	0	12 (9)	1 (1)
DF	(Hungary)	18	Ádám Lang	7	0	0	0	1	0	1	0	9 (7)	0 (0)
MF	(Serbia)	19	Nemanja Andrić	7	0	1	0	0	0	0	0	8 (7)	0 (0)
MF	(Romania)	20	Mihai Nicorec	0	0	0	0	0	0	2	0	2 (0)	0 (0)
MF	(Czech Republic)	21	Marek Střeštík	3	0	0	0	0	0	1	0	4 (3)	0 (0)
MF	(Czech Republic)	22	Michal Švec	2	1	0	0	1	0	0	0	3 (2)	1 (1)
MF	(Bosnia and Herzegovina)	24	Đorđe Kamber	9	0	1	0	1	0	0	0	11 (9)	0 (0)
DF	(Jamaica)	25	Rafe Wolfe	4	1	1	0	0	0	0	0	5 (4)	1 (1)
GK	(Slovakia)	26	Ľuboš Kamenár	2	1	0	0	0	0	0	0	2 (2)	1 (1)
MF	(Hungary)	29	Tamás Koltai	0	0	1	0	0	0	0	0	1 (0)	0 (0)
MF	(El Salvador)	30	Rafael Burgos	1	0	0	0	0	0	0	0	1 (1)	0 (0)
DF	(Hungary)	33	Bálint Nagy	0	0	0	0	0	0	1	0	1 (0)	0 (0)
			TOTALS	88	6	8	0	10	0	18	1	124 (88)	7 (6)

=== Overall ===
Games played	45 (30 OTP Bank Liga, 2 Champions League, 5 Hungarian Cup and 8 Hungarian League Cup)
Games won	26 (18 OTP Bank Liga, 0 Champions League, 3 Hungarian Cup and 5 Hungarian League Cup)
Games drawn	10 (8 OTP Bank Liga, 0 Champions League, 1 Hungarian Cup and 1 Hungarian League Cup)
Games lost	9 (4 OTP Bank Liga, 2 Champions League, 1 Hungarian Cup and 2 Hungarian League Cup)
Goals scored	93
Goals conceded	53
Goal difference	+50
Yellow cards	124
Red cards	7
Worst discipline	(Hungary) Máté Pátkai (12 (yellow card) , 1 (red card) )
Worst discipline	(Hungary) Zoltán Lipták (12 (yellow card) , 1 (red card) )
Best result	7–0 (H) v Tatabánya – Ligakupa – 4 September 2013
Worst result	0–3 (A) v Mezőkövesd – OTP Bank Liga – 23 November 2013
Worst result	2–5 (H) v Pécs – OTP Bank Liga – 8 March 2014
Most appearances	(Hungary) Roland Varga (39 appearances)
Top scorer	(Hungary) Gergely Rudolf (13 goals)
Points	90/135 (66.67%)

Last updated: 1 June 2014

== Nemzeti Bajnokság I ==
=== Matches ===
27 July 2013 1	Győr	1–1	Diósgyőr	Győr, Győr-Moson-Sopron County
21:00 CEST	Wolfe 78'	(Report)	Husić 53'	Stadium: ETO Park; Attendance: 2,500; Referee: (Hungary) József Erdős

3 August 2013 2	Szombathely	2–2	Győr	Szombathely, Vas County
19:00 CET	Radó 9' (pen.), 58'	(Report)	Martínez 33'; Kink 54' (pen.)	Stadium: Rohonci Street Stadium; Attendance: 2,490; Referee: (Hungary) Péter Solymosi

10 August 2013 3	Győr	1–2	Ferencváros	Győr, Győr-Moson-Sopron County
21:00 CEST	Varga 47'	(Report)	Holman 58'; Jenner 88'	Stadium: ETO Park; Attendance: 7,000; Referee: (Hungary) Sándor Andó-Szabó

17 August 2013 4	Pécs	1–1	Győr	Pécs, Baranya County
19:00 CEST	Koller 11' (pen.)	(Report)	Trajković 16'	Stadium: Stadion PMFC; Attendance: 2,100; Referee: (Hungary) István Vad

25 August 2013 5	Győr	1–1	Videoton	Győr, Győr-Moson-Sopron County
20:30 CEST	Pátkai 18'	(Report)	Juhász 35'	Stadium: ETO Park; Attendance: 4,000; Referee: (Hungary) Viktor Kassai

31 August 2013 6	Győr	2–0	Paks	Győr, Győr-Moson-Sopron County
16:30 CEST	Andrić 21'; Szabó 40' (o.g.)	(Report)		Stadium: ETO Park; Attendance: 2,500; Referee: (Hungary) Mihály Fábián

15 September 2013 7	MTK	1–2	Győr	Budapest, Pest County
18:30 CEST	Kanta 18'	(Report)	Rudolf 65'; Lázok 89'	Stadium: Hidegkuti Nándor Stadium; Attendance: 500; Referee: (Hungary) Sándor Andó-Szabó

22 September 2013 8	Győr	3–0	Debrecen	Győr, Győr-Moson-Sopron County
18:30 CEST	Völgyi 2'; Kamber 60'; Varga 90+1'	(Report)		Stadium: ETO Park; Attendance: 2,800; Referee: (Hungary) Ádám Farkas

28 September 2013 9	Kecskemét	1–0	Győr	Kecskemét, Bács-Kiskun County
20:00 CEST	Savić 55'	(Report)		Stadium: Széktói Stadion; Attendance: 1,326; Referee: (Hungary) István Vad

5 October 2013 10	Győr	4–1	Pápa	Győr, Győr-Moson-Sopron County
14:00 CEST	Pátkai 32'; Trajković 55'; Andrić 57'; Koltai 59'	(Report)	Arsić 81'	Stadium: ETO Park; Attendance: 1,800; Referee: (Hungary) Dániel Becséri

20 October 2013 11	Újpest	1–2	Győr	Budapest, Pest County
16:30 CEST	Kabát 36'	(Report)	Pátkai 10'; Lipták 15'	Stadium: Szusza Ferenc Stadium; Attendance: 1,964; Referee: (Hungary) Ádám Farkas

27 October 2013 12	Győr	2–2	Puskás	Győr, Győr-Moson-Sopron County
18:30 CET	Andrić 5'; Kronaveter 39'	(Report)	Lencse 7'; Nikolić 75'	Stadium: ETO Park; Attendance: 2,600; Referee: (Hungary) Viktor Kassai

3 November 2013 13	Honvéd	1–1	Győr	Budapest, Pest County
18:30 CET	Daud 71'	(Report)	Martínez 84'	Stadium: Bozsik Stadion; Attendance: 1,500; Referee: (Hungary) Péter Solymosi

9 November 2013 14	Győr	1–0	Kaposvár	Győr, Győr-Moson-Sopron County
16:00 CET	Lipták 65'	(Report)		Stadium: ETO Park; Attendance: 1,500; Referee: (Hungary) Dániel Becséri

23 November 2013 15	Mezőkövesd	3–0	Győr	Mezőkövesd, Borsod-Abaúj-Zemplén County
20:00 CET	Melczer 29'; Balajti 81'; Harsányi 90+1'	(Report)		Stadium: Mezőkövesdi Városi Stadion; Attendance: 2,200; Referee: (Hungary) Zoltán Iványi

1 December 2013 16	Diósgyőr	1–2	Győr	Miskolc, Borsod-Abaúj-Zemplén County
16:30 CET	Kostić 43'	(Report)	Střeštík 55'; Pátkai 67'	Stadium: DVTK Stadion; Attendance: 5,080; Referee: (Hungary) Sándor Andó-Szabó

8 December 2013 17	Győr	2–1	Szombathely	Győr, Győr-Moson-Sopron County
18:30 CET	Martínez 69'; Andrić 74'	(Report)	Radó 36' (pen.)	Stadium: ETO Park; Attendance: 1,700; Referee: (Hungary) Zoltán Iványi

2 March 2014 18	Ferencváros	1–1	Győr	Budapest, Pest County
16:30 CET	Leonardo 74'	(Report)	Varga 87'	Stadium: Ferenc Puskás Stadium; Attendance: 11,228; Referee: (Hungary) Péter Solymosi

8 March 2014 19	Győr	2–5	Pécs	Győr, Győr-Moson-Sopron County
20:00 CET	Kalmár 22'; Wolfe 49'	(Report)	Pölöskey 4'; Szatmári 9'; Koller 52', 87' (pen.); Kővári 65'	Stadium: ETO Park; Attendance: 2,500; Referee: (Hungary) Viktor Kassai

16 March 2014 20	Videoton	0–1	Győr	Székesfehérvár, Fejér County
18:30 CET		(Report)	Martínez 67'	Stadium: Sóstói Stadion; Attendance: 3,050; Referee: (Hungary) István Vad

22 March 2014 21	Paks	1–2	Győr	Paks, Tolna County
20:00 CET	Bartha 20'	(Report)	Rudolf 12', 26'	Stadium: Stadion PSE; Attendance: 1,600; Referee: (Hungary) Péter Solymosi

29 March 2014 22	Győr	3–0	MTK	Győr, Győr-Moson-Sopron County
20:00 CET	Rudolf 12'; Lipták 67'; Andrić 71'	(Report)		Stadium: ETO Park; Attendance: 2,800; Referee: (Hungary) Ádám Farkas

5 April 2014 23	Debrecen	2–2	Győr	Debrecen, Hajdú-Bihar County
20:00 CEST	Lázár 22'; Mihelič 60'	(Report)	Pátkai 11'; Střeštík 25'	Stadium: Stadion Oláh Gábor Út; Attendance: 8,500; Referee: (Hungary) Viktor Kassai

13 April 2014 24	Győr	2–1	Kecskemét	Győr, Győr-Moson-Sopron County
18:30 CEST	Střeštík 65'; Varga 90+3'	(Report)	Gréczi 9'	Stadium: ETO Park; Attendance: 2,500; Referee: (Hungary) Péter Solymosi

19 April 2014 25	Pápa	1–2	Győr	Pápa, Veszprém County
14:00 CEST	Eszlátyi 81'	(Report)	Kamber 40'; Střeštík 45'	Stadium: Stadion Várkerti; Attendance: 2,000; Referee: (Hungary) Zoltán Iványi

27 April 2014 26	Győr	1–0	Újpest	Győr, Győr-Moson-Sopron County
16:30 CEST	Andrić 64'	(Report)		Stadium: ETO Park; Attendance: 5,000; Referee: (Hungary) István Vad

3 May 2014 27	Puskás	0–1	Győr	Felcsút, Fejér County
20:00 CEST		(Report)	Kalmár 58'	Stadium: Pancho Arena; Attendance: 3,623; Referee: (Hungary) Ádám Németh

11 May 2014 28	Győr	4–2	Honvéd	Győr, Győr-Moson-Sopron County
16:30 CEST	Rudolf 12'; Pátkai 29', 77'; Burgos 90+2'	(Report)	Vécsei 32'; Kapacina 44'	Stadium: ETO Park; Attendance: 1,500; Referee: (Hungary) Zoltán Iványi

17 May 2014 29	Kaposvár	0–5	Győr	Kaposvár, Somogy County
20:00 CEST		(Report)	Andrić 3'; Lipták 8'; Rudolf 31', 66'; Trajković 73'	Stadium: Stadion Kaposvár Rákóczi; Attendance: 2,000; Referee: (Hungary) Mihály Fábián

31 May 2014 30	Győr	5–0	Mezőkövesd	Győr-Gyirmót, Győr-Moson-Sopron County
20:00 CEST	Lang 28'; Wolfe 36'; Trajković 79'; Đorđević 83'; Kronaveter 87'	(Report)		Stadium: Stadion Ménfői Út; Attendance: 2,800; Referee: (Hungary) József Erdős

=== Classification ===
Pos	Team	Pld	W	D	L	GF	GA	GD	Pts	Qualification or relegation
1	Debrecen (C)	30	18	8	4	66	33	+33	62	Qualification for Champions League second qualifying round
2	Győr	30	18	8	4	58	32	+26	62	Qualification for Europa League second qualifying round
3	Ferencváros	30	17	6	7	47	33	+14	57	Qualification for Europa League first qualifying round
4	Videoton	30	15	8	7	52	31	+21	53	
5	Diósgyőr	30	12	11	7	45	38	+7	47	Qualification for Europa League first qualifying round (Note: Diósgyőr qualified for the Europa League first qualifying round as the 2013–14 Magyar Kupa runners-up since the winners, Újpest, failed to receive the UEFA license to participate in European competitions.)

Source: mlsz.hu (in Hungarian)
Rules for classification: 1st points; 2nd overall wins; 3rd goal difference; 4th head-to-head points; 5th head-to-head goal difference; 6th head-to-head away goals scored; 7th fair-play points; 8th drawing of lots
(C) Champions

=== Results summary ===
Overall								Home						Away					
Pld	W	D	L	GF	GA	GD	Pts	W	D	L	GF	GA	GD	W	D	L	GF	GA	GD
30	18	8	4	58	32	+26	62	10	3	2	34	16	+18	8	5	2	24	16	+8

Last updated: 1 June 2014.
Source: NB1

=== Results by round ===
Round	1	2	3	4	5	6	7	8	9	10	11	12	13	14	15	16	17	18	19	20	21	22	23	24	25	26	27	28	29	30
Ground	H	A	H	A	H	H	A	H	A	H	A	H	A	H	A	A	H	A	H	A	A	H	A	H	A	H	A	H	A	H
Result	D	D	L	D	D	W	W	W	L	W	W	D	D	W	L	W	W	D	L	W	W	W	D	W	W	W	W	W	W	W
Position	8	10	11	12	14	12	8	7	7	5	5	6	7	5	6	5	3	3	3	3	3	2	2	2	2	2	2	2	2	2

Updated to match(es) played on 1 June 2014. Source: Matches
A = Away; H = Home; W = Win; D = Draw; L = Loss

== Hungarian Cup ==
30 October 2013 Round of 32	Gyirmót	0–3	Győr	Győr, Győr-Moson-Sopron County
17:00 CET		(Report)	Đorđević 28'; Dinjar 69'; Andrić 90+1'	Stadium: Stadium Ménfő Street; Attendance: 1,800; Referee: (Hungary) László Varga

27 November 2013 Round of 16 (1st leg)	Kaposvár	1–2	Győr	Kaposvár, Somogy County
17:00 CET	Oláh 71' (pen.)	(Report)	Střeštík 59'; Jánvári 64' (o.g.)	Stadium: Stadion Kaposvár Rákóczi; Attendance: 500; Referee: (Hungary) József Erdős

4 December 2013 Round of 16 (2nd leg)	Győr	2–1 (4–2 agg.)	Kaposvár	Győr, Győr-Moson-Sopron County
18:00 CET	Rudolf 15'; Střeštík 90+1'	Report	Pavlović 41'	Stadium: ETO Park; Attendance: 300; Referee: (Hungary) István Vad

12 March 2014 Quarter-final (1st leg)	MTK	2–0	Győr	Budapest, Pest County
17:30 CET	Torghelle 37'; Kanta 67'	(Report)		Stadium: Hidegkuti Nándor Stadium; Attendance: 500; Referee: (Hungary) József Erdős

26 March 2014 Quarter-final (2nd leg)	Győr	3–3 (3–5 agg.)	MTK	Győr, Győr-Moson-Sopron County
18:00 CET	Pátkai 21'; Varga 23'; Andrić 85'	Report	Kanta 45', 87'; Eppel 47'	Stadium: ETO Park; Attendance: 1,200; Referee: (Hungary) Sándor Andó-Szabó

== League Cup ==
=== Group stage ===
4 September 2013 1	Győr	7–0	Tatabány	Győr, Győr-Moson-Sopron County
18:00 CEST	Lázok 3'; Martínez 19', 21', 41'; Völgyi 28', 64'; Rudolf 29'	(Report)		Stadium: ETO Park; Attendance: 500; Referee: (Hungary) Balázs Berke

11 September 2013 2	Sopron	1–4	Győr	Sopron, Győr-Moson-Sopron County
18:00 CEST	Szabó 79'	(Report)	Stanišić 31'; Pátkai 61'; Kronaveter 67'; Burgos 76'	Stadium: Stadion Városi; Attendance: 1,000; Referee: (Hungary) Csaba Pintér

16 November 2013 3	Ferencváros	2–1	Győr	Budapest, Pest County
17:00 CET	Diallo 52', 61'	(Report)	Varga 38'	Stadium: Puskás Ferenc Stadium; Attendance: 2,500; Referee: (Hungary) Gábor Oláh

16 October 2013 4	Győr	4–1	Ferencváros	Győr, Győr-Moson-Sopron County
19:30 CEST	Varga 8', 88'; Kronaveter 45'; Andrić 73'	(Report)	Gyömbér 30'	Stadium: ETO Park; Attendance: 1,100; Referee: (Hungary) Gergely Szőts

13 November 2013 5	Győr	1–1	Sopron	Győr, Győr-Moson-Sopron County
18:00 CET	Burgos 44'	(Report)	Gaál 71'	Stadium: ETO Park; Attendance: 200; Referee: (Hungary) Csaba Pintér

20 November 2013 6	Tatabánya	0–4	Győr	Tatabánya, Komárom-Esztergom County
13:00 CET		(Report)	Rudolf 16', 23', 39'; Burgos 46'	Stadium: Városi Stadion; Attendance: 100; Referee: (Hungary) Zoltán J. Kovács

==== Classification ====
Pos	Team	Pld	W	D	L	GF	GA	GD	Pts	Qualification
1	Ferencváros	6	5	0	1	14	8	+6	15	Advance to knockout phase
2	Győr	6	4	1	1	21	5	+16	13	Advance to knockout phase
3	Sopron	6	2	1	3	13	11	+2	7	
4	Tatabánya	6	0	0	6	2	26	−24	0	

Rules for classification: 1) points; 2) goal difference; 3) number of goals scored.

=== Knockout phase ===
26 February 2014 Round of 16 (1st leg)	Győr	2–1	Debrecen	Győr, Győr-Moson-Sopron County
17:00 CET	Dudás 51'; Rudolf 84'	(Report)	Bódi 47'	Stadium: ETO Park; Attendance: 1,500; Referee: (Hungary) Dániel Becséri

4 March 2014 Round of 16 (2nd leg)	Debrecen	3–1 (4–3 agg.)	Győr	Debrecen, Hajdú-Bihar County
17:00 CET	Bódi 50'; Bouadla 69'; Kovács 88'	(Report)	Nicorec 74' (pen.)	Stadium: Stadion Oláh Gábor Út; Attendance: 1,500; Referee: (Hungary) Ádám Németh

== UEFA Champions League ==
The First and Second Qualifying Round draws took place at UEFA headquarters in Nyon, Switzerland on 24 June 2013.

17 July 2013 Q2 Leg 1	Győri ETO (Hungary)	0–2	(Israel) Maccabi Tel Aviv	Győr
20:30 CEST		(Report)	Yitzhaki 76'; Albermam 90+3'	Stadium: ETO Park; Attendance: 8,175; Referee: (Austria) Markus Hameter

23 July 2012 Q2 Leg 2	Maccabi Tel Aviv (Israel)	2–1 (4–1 agg.)	(Hungary) Győri ETO	Tel Aviv
20:30 CEST	Ben Haim 25'; Zahavi 79'	Report	Martínez 86'	Stadium: Bloomfield Stadium; Referee: (Sweden) Martin Hansson

== Pre-season ==
26 June 2013 1	MŠK - Thermál Veľký Meder (Slovakia)	0–6	(Hungary) Győri ETO FC	Veľký Meder, Slovakia
CEST		(Report)	Kronaveter; Kink; Varga; Kamber; Nicorec; Martínez	Stadium: Stadium Veľký Meder; Attendance: 800; Referee: (Slovakia) Matlák

28 June 2013 2	Tekenye (Hungary)	0–21	(Hungary) Győri ETO FC	Tekenye, Zala County
CEST		(Report)	Koltai; Windecker; Nicorec; Kink; Kamber; Kronaveter; Kalmár; Lázok; Tokody; Stanišić; Wolfe; Varga; Đorđević	Attendance: 50; Referee: (Hungary)

29 June 2013 3	Győri ETO FC (Hungary)	3–2	(Austria) SC-ESV Parndorf 1919	Győr, Győr-Moson-Sopron County
CEST	Martínez 49'; Dinjar 114'; Kalmár 120'	(Report)	Lindner 46'; Stern 102' (pen.)	Stadium: ETO Park; Attendance: 800; Referee: (Hungary)

3 July 2013 4	Győri ETO FC (Hungary)	1–1	(Czech Republic) 1. FC Slovácko	Győr, Győr-Moson-Sopron County
16:00 CEST	Nicorec 87'	(Report)	Ondřejka 55'	Stadium: ETO Park; Attendance: 300; Referee: (Hungary) Norbert Kiss

3 July 2013 5	Győri ETO FC (Hungary)	4–0	(Czech Republic) 1. FC Slovácko	Győr, Győr-Moson-Sopron County
19:00 CEST	Kink 25', 64'; Kamber 28'; Völgyi 83' (pen.)	(Report)		Stadium: ETO Park; Attendance: 500; Referee: (Hungary) Péter Solymosi

10 July 2013 6	Győri ETO FC (Hungary)	2–1	(Romania) CS Pandurii Târgu Jiu	Győr, Győr-Moson-Sopron County
19:00 CEST	Koltai 100'; Nicorec 112'	(Report)	Matulevičius 43'	Stadium: ETO Park; Attendance: 500; Referee: (Hungary) Zsolt Szabó

20 July 2013 7	Gyirmót SE (Hungary)	1–3	(Hungary) Győri ETO FC	Győr, Győr-Moson-Sopron County
19:00 CEST	Magasföldi	(Report)	Varga; Kamber; Koltai	Stadium: Stadium Ménfő Street; Attendance: 300; Referee: (Hungary) Balázs Böcskei
