= 2014–15 Győri ETO FC season =

Győri ETO FC
2014–15 season
- Chairman: (Hungary) Csaba Tarsoly
- Manager: (Hungary) Ferenc Horváth
Home colours	Away colours

The 2014–15 season marks the Győri ETO FC's 71st competitive season, 55th consecutive season in the OTP Bank Liga and 110th year in existence as a football club.

== First team squad ==
Note: Flags indicate national team as defined under FIFA eligibility rules; some limited exceptions apply. Players may hold more than one non-FIFA nationality.

No.	Pos.	Nation	Player
1	GK	HUN	Krisztián Pogacsics (on loan from Bihor)
2	DF	HUN	Dániel Sváb
3	MF	CRO	Marko Dinjar
7	MF	HUN	András Stieber
8	MF	HUN	Ádám Dudás
10	MF	ITA	Leandro Martínez
11	FW	HUN	Roland Varga
12	MF	SRB	Nikola Trajković
13	FW	GEO	Giorgi Kvilitaia
14	FW	HUN	Gergely Rudolf
15	DF	HUN	Dániel Völgyi
16	DF	HUN	Zoltán Lipták
17	MF	HUN	Máté Pátkai
18	DF	HUN	Ádám Lang

No.	Pos.	Nation	Player
19	MF	SRB	Nemanja Andrić
20	FW	HUN	Tamás Priskin
21	MF	CZE	Marek Střeštík
22	MF	CZE	Michal Švec
23	MF	HUN	József Windecker
24	MF	BIH	Đorđe Kamber
25	DF	JAM	Rafe Wolfe
26	GK	SVK	Ľuboš Kamenár
27	MF	SVK	László Bénes
28	MF	HUN	Dávid Illés
29	MF	HUN	Tamás Koltai
30	GK	SRB	Miloš Kocić
41	MF	HUN	Bence Mervó

== Transfers ==
=== Summer ===
In: Note: Flags indicate national team as defined under FIFA eligibility rules; some limited exceptions apply. Players may hold more than one non-FIFA nationality.

No.	Pos.	Nation	Player
1	GK	HUN	Krisztián Pogacsics (loan from (Romania) Bihor Oradea)
2	DF	HUN	Dániel Sváb (from (Germany) Energie Cottbus)
7	MF	HUN	András Stieber (from (England) Aston Villa U-21)
13	FW	GEO	Giorgi Kvilitaia (from (Georgia (country)) Dila Gori)
14	MF	HUN	Máté Kiss (loan return from Mezőkövesd)
19	FW	HUN	András Simon (loan return from Kecskemét)
20	FW	HUN	Tamás Priskin (from Austria Wien)
23	MF	HUN	József Windecker (loan return from Paks)
30	GK	SRB	Miloš Kocić (from (United States) Portland)

Out: Note: Flags indicate national team as defined under FIFA eligibility rules; some limited exceptions apply. Players may hold more than one non-FIFA nationality.

No.	Pos.	Nation	Player
1	GK	HUN	Krisztián Pogacsics (loan return to (Romania) Bihor Oradea)
4	DF	SRB	Lazar Stanišić
5	MF	CMR	Patrick Mevoungou
6	DF	SVK	Marián Had
7	FW	HUN	Balázs Farkas (to Győr II)
9	MF	SVN	Rok Kronaveter
13	MF	HUN	Zsolt Kalmár (to (Germany) Leipzig)
14	MF	HUN	Máté Kiss (loan to Gyirmót)
19	FW	HUN	András Simon (to Paks)
20	MF	ROU	Mihai Nicorec
27	GK	HUN	Gergely Nagy (to Dunaújváros)
28	DF	SRB	Vladimir Đorđević (to (Serbia) Radnički Niš)
30	FW	SLV	Rafael Burgos (loan return to (El Salvador) Alianza)

=== Winter ===
In: Note: Flags indicate national team as defined under FIFA eligibility rules; some limited exceptions apply. Players may hold more than one non-FIFA nationality.

No.	Pos.	Nation	Player
—	MF	ROU	Dan Bucșa (from (Romania) U.Cluj)
—	DF	CRO	Luis Ibáñez (from (Croatia) Dinamo Zagreb)
—	DF	MKD	Vladica Brdarovski (from (North Macedonia) Pelister)
—	FW	BIH	Miroslav Stevanović (from (Spain) Sevilla)

Out: Note: Flags indicate national team as defined under FIFA eligibility rules; some limited exceptions apply. Players may hold more than one non-FIFA nationality.

No.	Pos.	Nation	Player
2	DF	HUN	Ákos Takács (Retired)
2	DF	HUN	Dániel Sváb
7	MF	HUN	András Stieber (loan to Pápa)
8	MF	HUN	Ádám Dudás (to Haladás)
10	FW	ITA	Leandro Martínez (to Haladás)
11	FW	HUN	Roland Varga (to Ferencváros)
25	DF	JAM	Rafe Wolfe (to Dunaújváros)

- List of Hungarian football transfers summer 2014
- List of Hungarian football transfers winter 2014–15

== Statistics ==
=== Appearances and goals ===
Last updated on 9 December 2014.

No.	Pos	Nat	Player	Total		OTP Bank Liga		Europa League		Hungarian Cup		League Cup	
No.	Pos	Nat	Player	Apps	Goals	Apps	Goals	Apps	Goals	Apps	Goals	Apps	Goals
1	GK	(Hungary) HUN	Krisztián Pogacsics	7	-11	3	-6	0	0	2	-1	2	-4
2	DF	(Hungary) HUN	Dániel Sváb	6	0	2	0	0	0	0	0	4	0
3	MF	(Croatia) CRO	Marko Dinjar	14	0	8	0	1	0	3	0	2	0
7	MF	(Hungary) HUN	András Stieber	11	0	2	0	0	0	2	0	7	0
8	MF	(Hungary) HUN	Ádám Dudás	9	2	4	0	1	0	1	0	3	2
10	MF	(Italy) ITA	Leandro Martínez	17	5	8	2	0	0	2	0	7	3
11	FW	(Hungary) HUN	Roland Varga	16	2	11	1	2	0	3	1	0	0
12	MF	(Serbia) SRB	Nikola Trajković	13	0	7	0	1	0	1	0	4	0
13	FW	(Georgia (country)) GEO	Giorgi Kvilitaia	12	10	7	1	0	0	1	0	4	9
14	FW	(Hungary) HUN	Gergely Rudolf	23	6	17	6	2	0	3	0	1	0
15	DF	(Hungary) HUN	Dániel Völgyi	15	3	8	1	1	0	1	0	5	2
16	DF	(Hungary) HUN	Zoltán Lipták	21	2	17	2	0	0	3	0	1	0
17	MF	(Hungary) HUN	Máté Pátkai	23	6	16	5	2	0	4	1	1	0
18	DF	(Hungary) HUN	Ádám Lang	23	0	16	0	1	0	4	0	2	0
19	MF	(Serbia) SRB	Nemanja Andrić	21	1	12	0	2	1	3	0	4	0
20	FW	(Hungary) HUN	Tamás Priskin	19	5	15	4	0	0	3	1	1	0
21	MF	(Czech Republic) CZE	Marek Střeštík	10	3	7	1	0	0	3	2	0	0
22	DF	(Czech Republic) CZE	Michal Švec	21	0	11	0	2	0	3	0	5	0
23	MF	(Hungary) HUN	József Windecker	17	0	9	0	2	0	3	0	3	0
24	MF	(Bosnia and Herzegovina) BIH	Đorđe Kamber	22	0	13	0	2	0	3	0	4	0
25	DF	(Jamaica) JAM	Rafe Wolfe	18	1	9	0	1	0	2	1	6	0
26	GK	(Slovakia) SVK	Ľuboš Kamenár	11	-17	4	-4	1	-3	1	-1	5	-9
27	MF	(Slovakia) SVK	László Bénes	5	0	1	0	0	0	0	0	4	0
28	MF	(Hungary) HUN	Dávid Illés	8	0	1	0	1	0	0	0	6	0
29	MF	(Hungary) HUN	Tamás Koltai	21	3	13	2	2	0	3	0	3	1
30	GK	(Serbia) SRB	Miloš Kocić	13	-14	10	-11	1	0	1	-2	1	-1
41	MF	(Hungary) HUN	Bence Mervó	4	0	2	0	0	0	0	0	2	0
Youth players:
5	DF	(Croatia) CRO	Valentin Babić	1	0	0	0	0	0	1	0	0	0
9	DF	(Hungary) HUN	Dávid Tóth	1	0	0	0	0	0	0	0	1	0
31	DF	(Hungary) HUN	Imre Vankó	6	0	0	0	0	0	0	0	6	0
32	FW	(Hungary) HUN	Bálint Nagy	2	0	0	0	0	0	0	0	2	0
32	DF	(Hungary) HUN	Ádám Nagy	3	0	0	0	0	0	0	0	3	0
32	DF	(Serbia) SRB	Lazar Stanišić	5	0	0	0	0	0	0	0	5	0
32	DF	(Hungary) HUN	Márk Kelemen	1	0	0	0	0	0	0	0	1	0
33	MF	(Hungary) HUN	Dávid Kerékgyártó	4	0	0	0	0	0	0	0	4	0
34	MF	(Slovakia) SVK	Sinan Medgyes	2	0	0	0	0	0	0	0	2	0
34	MF	(Hungary) HUN	Bence Lenzsér	1	0	0	0	0	0	0	0	1	0
34	MF	(Hungary) HUN	Bence Szabó	2	0	0	0	0	0	0	0	2	0
35	DF	(Hungary) HUN	Viktor Pongrácz	1	0	0	0	0	0	0	0	1	0
36	FW	(Hungary) HUN	Milán Mayer	2	1	0	0	0	0	0	0	2	1
37	MF	(Hungary) HUN	Zoltán Farkas	4	0	0	0	0	0	0	0	4	0
Players no longer at the club:
6	DF	(Slovakia) SVK	Marián Had	1	0	0	0	1	0	0	0	0	0
9	MF	(Slovenia) SVN	Rok Kronaveter	6	0	4	0	2	0	0	0	0	0

=== Top scorers ===
Includes all competitive matches. The list is sorted by shirt number when total goals are equal.

Last updated on 9 December 2014

Position	Nation	Number	Name	OTP Bank Liga	Hungarian Cup	Europa League	League Cup	Total
1	(Georgia (country))	13	Giorgi Kvilitaia	1	0	0	9	10
2	(Hungary)	14	Gergely Rudolf	6	0	0	0	6
3	(Hungary)	17	Máté Pátkai	5	0	1	0	6
4	(Hungary)	20	Tamás Priskin	4	0	1	0	5
5	(Italy)	10	Leandro Martínez	2	0	0	3	5
6	(Hungary)	29	Tamás Koltai	2	0	0	1	3
7	(Czech Republic)	21	Marek Střeštík	1	0	2	0	3
8	(Hungary)	15	Dániel Völgyi	1	0	0	2	3
9	(Hungary)	16	Zoltán Lipták	2	0	0	0	2
10	(Hungary)	11	Roland Varga	1	0	1	0	2
11	(Hungary)	8	Ádám Dudás	0	0	0	2	2
12	(Serbia)	19	Nemanja Andrić	0	1	0	0	1
13	(Jamaica)	25	Rafe Wolfe	0	0	1	0	1
14	(Hungary)	34	Milán Mayer	0	0	0	1	1
/	/	/	Own Goals	0	0	0	0	0
			TOTALS	25	1	6	18	50

=== Disciplinary record ===
Includes all competitive matches. Players with 1 card or more included only.

Last updated on 9 December 2014

Position	Nation	Number	Name	OTP Bank Liga		Europa League		Hungarian Cup		League Cup		Total (Hu Total)	
Position	Nation	Number	Name	Booked	Sent off (straight red)	Booked	Sent off (straight red)	Booked	Sent off (straight red)	Booked	Sent off (straight red)	Booked	Sent off (straight red)
MF	(Croatia)	3	Marko Dinjar	1	0	0	0	2	0	0	0	3 (1)	0 (0)
DF	(Croatia)	5	Valentin Babić	0	0	0	0	1	0	0	0	1 (0)	0 (0)
MF	(Hungary)	7	András Stieber	0	0	0	0	1	0	1	0	2 (0)	0 (0)
MF	(Hungary)	8	Ádám Dudás	0	0	0	0	0	0	1	0	1 (0)	0 (0)
MF	(Italy)	10	Leandro Martínez	1	0	0	0	0	0	0	0	1 (1)	0 (0)
FW	(Hungary)	11	Roland Varga	0	1	0	0	0	0	0	0	0 (0)	1 (1)
MF	(Serbia)	12	Nikola Trajković	2	0	1	0	0	0	1	0	4 (2)	0 (0)
FW	(Georgia (country))	13	Giorgi Kvilitaia	1	0	0	0	0	0	0	0	1 (1)	0 (0)
FW	(Hungary)	14	Gergely Rudolf	1	0	0	1	1	0	0	0	2 (1)	1 (0)
DF	(Hungary)	15	Dániel Völgyi	4	0	0	0	1	0	1	0	6 (4)	0 (0)
DF	(Hungary)	16	Zoltán Lipták	2	0	0	0	2	0	1	0	5 (2)	0 (0)
MF	(Hungary)	17	Máté Pátkai	6	0	2	0	0	0	1	0	8 (6)	1 (0)
DF	(Hungary)	18	Ádám Lang	4	0	1	0	0	0	0	0	5 (4)	0 (0)
MF	(Serbia)	19	Nemanja Andrić	2	0	0	0	1	0	0	0	3 (2)	0 (0)
FW	(Hungary)	20	Tamás Priskin	5	0	0	0	1	0	0	0	6 (5)	0 (0)
MF	(Czech Republic)	21	Marek Střeštík	1	0	0	0	0	0	0	0	1 (1)	0 (0)
DF	(Czech Republic)	22	Michal Švec	2	0	0	0	0	0	1	0	3 (2)	0 (0)
MF	(Hungary)	23	József Windecker	3	0	0	0	1	0	0	0	4 (3)	0 (0)
MF	(Bosnia and Herzegovina)	24	Đorđe Kamber	4	0	0	0	1	0	1	0	6 (4)	0 (0)
DF	(Jamaica)	25	Rafe Wolfe	4	0	0	0	0	0	0	0	4 (4)	0 (0)
MF	(Hungary)	29	Tamás Koltai	1	0	0	0	0	0	0	0	1 (1)	0 (0)
GK	(Serbia)	30	Miloš Kocić	1	0	0	0	0	0	0	0	1 (1)	0 (0)
FW	(Hungary)	32	Bálint Nagy	0	0	0	0	0	0	1	0	1 (0)	0 (0)
			TOTALS	45	1	4	1	12	0	8	1	69 (45)	3 (1)

=== Overall ===
Games played	31 (17 OTP Bank Liga, 2 Europa League, 4 Hungarian Cup and 8 Hungarian League Cup)
Games won	13 (6 OTP Bank Liga, 1 Europa League, 3 Hungarian Cup and 3 Hungarian League Cup)
Games drawn	7 (5 OTP Bank Liga, 0 Europa League, 0 Hungarian Cup and 2 Hungarian League Cup)
Games lost	11 (6 OTP Bank Liga, 1 Europa League, 1 Hungarian Cup and 3 Hungarian League Cup)
Goals scored	50
Goals conceded	42
Goal difference	+8
Yellow cards	69
Red cards	3
Worst discipline	(Hungary) Máté Pátkai (8 (yellow card) , 1 (red card) )
Best result	4–1 (A) v Gyirmót – Ligakupa – 16 September 2014
Best result	4–1 (H) v Csákvár – Ligakupa – 7 October 2014
Best result	3–0 (A) v Pécs – OTP Bank Liga – 8 November 2014
Worst result	0–3 (H) v Göteborg – UEFA Europa League – 17 July 2014
Most appearances	(Hungary) Máté Pátkai (23 appearances)
Most appearances	(Hungary) Gergely Rudolf (23 appearances)
Most appearances	(Hungary) Ádám Lang (23 appearances)
Top scorer	(Georgia (country)) Giorgi Kvilitaia (10 goals)
Points	46/93 (49.46%)

Last updated: 9 December 2014

== Nemzeti Bajnokság I ==
=== Matches ===
27 July 2014 1	Paks	2 – 0	Győr	Paks, Tolna County
20:30 CEST	Kecskés 19'; Heffler 25'	Report		Stadium: Stadion PSE; Attendance: 1,147; Referee: (Hungary) József Erdős

3 August 2014 2	Győr	3 – 1	Honvéd	Győr, Győr-Moson-Sopron County
18:30 CEST	Priskin 19'; Rudolf 76' (pen.); Pátkai 79'	Report	Youla 25'	Stadium: ETO Park; Attendance: 2,500; Referee: (Hungary) Ádám Németh

9 August 2014 3	Videoton	3 – 2	Győr	Székesfehérvár, Fejér County
16:30 CEST	Wolfe 58' (o.g.); Juhász 75'; Nikolić 83'	Report	Pátkai 42'; Rudolf 65'	Stadium: Sóstói Stadion; Attendance: 3,645; Referee: (Hungary) Zoltán Iványi

17 August 2014 4	Győr	0 – 1	Ferencváros	Győr, Győr-Moson-Sopron County
16:30 CEST		Report	Busai 45'	Stadium: ETO Park; Attendance: 7,213; Referee: (Hungary) Sándor Andó-Szabó

23 August 2014 5	Pápa	0 – 0	Győr	Pápa, Veszprém County
20:30 CEST		Report		Stadium: Stadion Várkerti; Attendance: 960; Referee: (Hungary) József Erdős

31 August 2014 6	Győr	4 – 3	Dunaújváros	Győr, Győr-Moson-Sopron County
18:30 CEST	Rudolf 25' (pen.); Pátkai 53', 59', 69'	Report	Perić 17'; Böőr 63' (pen.), 83' (pen.)	Stadium: ETO Park; Attendance: 2,525; Referee: (Hungary) Ádám Farkas

22 October 2014 7	Kecskemét	1 – 1	Győr	Kecskemét, Bács-Kiskun County
18:00 CEST	Bebeto 60'	Report	Lipták 35'	Stadium: Széktói Stadion; Attendance: 922; Referee: (Hungary) Péter Solymosi

20 September 2014 8	Nyíregyháza	2 – 3	Győr	Nyíregyháza, Szabolcs-Szatmár-Bereg County
14:30 CEST	Pákolicz 18'; Bajzát 69'	Report	Rudolf 8', 32'; Priskin 51'	Stadium: Városi Stadion; Attendance: 2,002; Referee: (Hungary) István Vad

27 September 2014 9	Győr	1 – 2	MTK	Győr, Győr-Moson-Sopron County
16:30 CEST	Střeštík 56'	Report	Střeštík 81' (o.g.); Hrepka 86'	Stadium: ETO Park; Attendance: 2,562; Referee: (Hungary) Zoltán Iványi

3 October 2014 10	Puskás	2 – 1	Győr	Felcsút, Fejér County
19:00 CEST	Lencse 42'; Tischler 70'	Report	Rudolf 19' (pen.)	Stadium: Pancho Arena; Attendance: 1,521; Referee: (Hungary) Péter Solymosi

19 October 2014 11	Győr	0 – 0	Újpest	Győr, Győr-Moson-Sopron County
18:30 CEST		Report		Stadium: ETO Park; Attendance: 3,048; Referee: (Hungary) Ádám Farkas

26 October 2014 12	Haladás	0 – 2	Győr	Szombathely, Vas County
18:30 CET		Report	Varga 36'; Völgyi 42'	Stadium: Rohonci Street Stadium; Attendance: 1,630; Referee: (Hungary) István Vad

1 November 2014 13	Győr	1 – 1	Diósgyőr	Győr, Győr-Moson-Sopron County
14:00 CET	Priskin 71'	Report	Marjanović 76'	Stadium: ETO Park; Attendance: 1,978; Referee: (Hungary) József Erdős

8 November 2014 14	Pécs	0 – 3	Győr	Pécs, Baranya County
18:00 CET		Report	Martínez 13', 19'; Priskin 67'	Stadium: Stadion PMFC; Attendance: 642; Referee: (Hungary) Zsolt Szabó

23 November 2014 15	Győr	0 – 1	Debrecen	Győr, Győr-Moson-Sopron County
18:30 CET		Report	Tisza 11'	Stadium: ETO Park; Attendance: 1,885; Referee: (Hungary) József Erdős

30 November 2014 16	Győr	2 – 2	Paks	Győr, Győr-Moson-Sopron County
18:30 CET	Kvilitaia 63'; Lipták 75'	Report	Simon 72'; Bartha 90+1'	Stadium: ETO Park; Attendance: 1,227; Referee: (Hungary) Viktor Kassai

6 December 2014 17	Honvéd	0 – 2	Győr	Budapest, Pest County
14:00 CET		Report	Koltai 7' 79'	Stadium: Bozsik Stadion; Attendance: 500; Referee: (Hungary) Sándor Andó-Szabó

=== Classification ===
Pos	Team	Pld	W	D	L	GF	GA	GD	Pts	Qualification or relegation
6	Újpest	30	14	9	7	40	28	+12	51	
7	Diósgyőr	30	13	9	8	43	36	+7	48	
8	Győr (R)	30	10	8	12	41	44	−3	38	Relegation to Nemzeti Bajnokság III (Note: Győr won't be a member of 2015–16 Nemzeti Bajnokság I due to financial and licence problems)
9	Kecskemét (R)	30	10	8	12	30	39	−9	38	Dissolved - Kecskeméti LC KTE SI in the Bács-Kiskun County Football League One as successor (Note: Kecskemét, Nyíregyháza and Pécs won't be members of 2015–16 Nemzeti Bajnokság I due to licence problems)
10	Puskás Akadémia	30	10	5	15	35	40	−5	35	

Source: mlsz.hu (in Hungarian)
Rules for classification: 1st points; 2nd overall wins; 3rd goal difference; 4th head-to-head points; 5th head-to-head goal difference; 6th head-to-head away goals scored; 7th fair-play points; 8th drawing of lots
(R) Relegated

=== Results summary ===
Overall								Home						Away					
Pld	W	D	L	GF	GA	GD	Pts	W	D	L	GF	GA	GD	W	D	L	GF	GA	GD
17	6	5	6	25	21	+4	23	2	3	3	11	11	0	4	2	3	14	10	+4

Last updated: 7 December 2014.
Source: NB1

=== Results by round ===
Round	1	2	3	4	5	6	7	8	9	10	11	12	13	14	15	16	17	18	19	20	21	22	23	24	25	26	27	28	29	30
Ground	A	H	A	H	A	H	A	A	H	A	H	A	H	A	H	H	A													
Result	L	W	L	L	D	W	D	W	L	L	D	W	D	W	L	D	W													
Position	13	8	11	11	10	9	8	7	7	9	9	8	9	8	9	10	9													

Updated to match(es) played on 7 December 2014. Source: Matches
A = Away; H = Home; W = Win; D = Draw; L = Loss

== Hungarian Cup ==
27 August 2014 Round 1	Sopron	0 – 1	Győr	Sopron, Győr-Moson-Sopron County
19:00 CEST		Report	Varga 27'	Stadium: Stadion Városi; Referee: (Hungary) Szabolcs Szilasi

10 September 2014 Round 2	Putnok	1 – 3	Győr	Putnok, Borsod-Abaúj-Zemplén County
15:30 CEST	Madarász 33'	Report	Střeštík 9', 14'; Pátkai 81'	Stadium: Városi Sporttelep; Attendance: 800; Referee: (Hungary) Ferenc Karakó

24 September 2014 Round 3	Mezőkövesd	1 – 2	Győr	Mezőkövesd, Borsod-Abaúj-Zemplén County
18:00 CEST	Baracskai 74'	Report	Priskin 28'; Wolfe 79'	Stadium: Városi Stadion; Attendance: 1,000; Referee: (Hungary) Viktor Kassai

29 October 2014 Quarter-final	Gyirmót	2 – 0	Győr	Győr, Győr-Moson-Sopron County
18:00 CET	Madarász 35'; Beliczky 88'	Report		Stadium: Stadium Ménfő Street; Attendance: 1,800; Referee: (Hungary) Csaba Pintér

== League Cup ==
=== Group stage ===
2 September 2014 1	Győr	3 – 3	Honvéd	Győr, Győr-Moson-Sopron County
18:00 CEST	Dudás 10', 44' (pen.); Martínez 58'	Report	Szabados 28'; Traoré 74'; Mancini 90+3' (pen.)	Stadium: ETO Park; Attendance: 300; Referee: (Hungary) Ádám Radványi

16 September 2014 2	Gyirmót	1 – 4	Győr	Győr, Győr-Moson-Sopron County
17:00 CEST	Andorka 29'	Report	Kvilitaia 69', 81'; Völgyi 76'; Koltai 77'	Stadium: Gyirmót Sporttelep; Attendance: 400; Referee: (Hungary) Balázs Berke

7 October 2014 3	Győr	4 – 1	Csákvár	Győr, Győr-Moson-Sopron County
18:00 CEST	Martínez 11'; Kvilitaia 30', 32', 59'	Report	Molnár 76'	Stadium: ETO Park; Attendance: 200; Referee: (Hungary) Szabolcs Szilasi

15 October 2014 4	Csákvár	3 – 5	Győr	Csákvár, Fejér County
19:00 CEST	Horváth 43'; Domján 60'; Gajdos 64'	Report	Völgyi 13'; Martínez 19'; Kvilitaia 27', 61', 75'	Stadium: Városi Sporttelep; Attendance: 300; Referee: (Hungary) Gábor Barna

11 November 2014 5	Győr	1 – 3	Gyirmót	Győr, Győr-Moson-Sopron County
18:00 CET	Kvilitaia 58'	Report	Paku 25'; Tóth 72'; Kiss 90+1'	Stadium: ETO Park; Attendance: 200; Referee: (Hungary) Gergely Kovács

19 November 2014 6	Honvéd	1 – 0	Győr	Budapest, Pest County
17:00 CET	Czár 77'	Report		Stadium: Bozsik Stadion; Attendance: 200; Referee: (Hungary) Gergely Szőts

Pos	Team	Pld	W	D	L	GF	GA	GD	Pts	Qualification	HON	GYŐ	GYI	CSÁ
1	Budapest Honvéd	6	4	1	1	19	12	+7	13	Advance to knockout phase	—	1–0	4–0	7–3
2	Győr	6	3	1	2	17	12	+5	10	Advance to knockout phase	3–3	—	1–3	4–1
3	Gyirmót	6	2	1	3	10	12	−2	7		1–2	1–4	—	4–0
4	Csákvár	6	1	1	4	13	23	−10	4		5–2	3–5	1–1	—

Source: Soccerway

=== Knockout phase ===
2 December 2014 Round of 16	Győr	1 – 2	Szigetszentmiklós	Győr, Győr-Moson-Sopron County
13:00 CET	Mayer 60'	Report	Szepessy 65'; Bonifert 73'	Stadium: ETO Park; Attendance: 150; Referee: (Hungary) Zsolt Szabó

9 December 2014 Round of 16	Szigetszentmiklós	0 – 0 (2 – 1 agg.)	Győr	Szigetszentmiklós, Pest County
12:00 CET		Report		Stadium: Stadium Sport Street; Attendance: 200; Referee: (Hungary) Péter Solymosi

== UEFA Europa League ==
The First and Second Qualifying Round draws took place at UEFA headquarters in Nyon, Switzerland on 23 June 2014.

17 July 2014 Q2 Leg 1	Győr (Hungary)	0 – 3	(Sweden) Göteborg	Győr
20:00 CEST		Report	Vibe 8'; Johansson 56'; Mahlangu 83'	Stadium: ETO Park; Attendance: 2,948; Referee: (Ukraine) Anatoliy Abdula

24 July 2014 Q2 Leg 2	Göteborg (Sweden)	0 – 1 (3 – 1 agg.)	(Hungary) Győr	Gothenburg
19:00 CEST		Report	Andrić 68'	Stadium: Gamla Ullevi; Attendance: 6,112; Referee: (Poland) Bartosz Frankwoski
