= András Stieber =

Hungarian footballer

Personal information
- Date of birth: 8 October 1991 (age 35)
- Place of birth: Sárvár, Hungary
- Height: 1.75 m (5 ft 9 in)
- Position: Midfielder

Team information
- Current team: FC Andau

Youth career
- 2003–2005: Újbuda FC
- 2005–2009: Újpest
- 2009–2014: Aston Villa

Senior career*
Years	Team	Apps	(Gls)
2014–2015	Győri ETO FC	2	(0)
2015	→ Lombard-Pápa (loan)	8	(0)
2015–2016	Ajka	18	(0)
2016–2017	Budaörsi	36	(10)
2017–2018	Gyirmót	15	(1)
2018–2019	MTE	18	(1)
2019–2020	Budaörsi	39	(10)
2020–2022	Újpest	0	(0)
2022	Haladás	5	(0)
2023–	FC Andau	1	(0)

International career
- Hungary U19
- * Club domestic league appearances and goals as of 18 March 2023

András Stieber (born 8 October 1991) is a Hungarian footballer who plays as a midfielder for FC Andau in the Austrian fourth-tier Landesliga Burgenland.

== Club career ==
In 2017, Stieber signed for Gyirmót.

On 23 February 2022, Stieber joined Haladás on a 1.5-year contract.

== Personal life ==
Stieber is the youngest brother of Hungarian international Zoltán Stieber, who also began his career at Goldball '94 and later played for the Aston Villa Under-21s with András.

== Career statistics ==
As of matches played 14 March 2020

Appearances and goals by club, season and competition
Club	Season	League			Magyar Kupa		Other		Total	
Club	Season	Division	Apps	Goals	Apps	Goals	Apps	Goals	Apps	Goals
Győri ETO FC	2014–15	NB I	2	0	2	0	7 (Note: Appearances in Ligakupa)	0	11	0
Győri ETO FC II	2014–15	NB III	2	0	—		—		2	0
Lombard-Pápa (loan)	2014–15	NB I	8	0	—		—		8	0
Ajka	2015–16	NB II	18	1	1	0	—		19	1
Budaörsi	2016–17	NB II	36	10	2	2	—		38	12
Gyirmót	2017–18	NB II	15	1	3	1	—		18	2
Gyirmót II	2017–18	NB III	8	0	—		—		8	0
MTE	2018–19	NB II	18	1	1	0	—		19	1
Budaörsi	2018–19	NB II	15	3	4	1	—		19	4
Budaörsi	2019–20	NB II	24	7	1	0	—		25	7
Budaörsi	Budaörsi Total		75	20	7	3	—		82	23
Újpest	2020–21	NB I	0	0	0	0	—		0	0
Career total			146	23	14	4	7	0	167	27
