= Nikola Trajković =

Serbian football manager and player

Personal information
- Date of birth: 5 January 1981 (age 45)
- Place of birth: Belgrade, SR Serbia, SFR Yugoslavia
- Height: 1.75 m (5 ft 9 in)
- Position: Midfielder

Youth career
- Čukarički

Senior career*
Years	Team	Apps	(Gls)
2000–2001	Kolubara		
2001–2004	Vojvodina	60	(5)
2004–2005	Zeta	29	(12)
2005–2009	Red Star Belgrade	40	(2)
2009	→ Thrasyvoulos (loan)	8	(1)
2010	Čukarički	13	(4)
2010–2015	Győr	98	(22)
Total		248	(46)

International career
2005	Serbia and Montenegro	2	(0)

Managerial career
- 2017–2021: Fløy
- 2021–2022: Radnički Niš (assistant)
- 2022–2023: Malmö FF (assistant)
- 2023: Radnički Niš
- 2024: Radnički Niš
- 2024: Novi Pazar
- 2024–2025: Mladost Lučani
- 2026: Dubočica
- * Club domestic league appearances and goals

Nikola Trajković (Serbian Cyrillic: Никола Трајковић; born 5 January 1981) is a Serbian football manager and former player.

== Club career ==
After a breakthrough season with Zeta, Trajković was transferred to Red Star Belgrade in July 2005, alongside Milanko Rašković, penning a four-year contract. He helped the club win back-to-back championship titles in 2006 and 2007, as well as two national cups.

== International career ==
In 2005, Trajković was capped twice for Serbia and Montenegro.

== Managerial statistics ==
As of 13 February 2025

Managerial record by team and tenure
Team	From	To	Record				
Team	From	To	G	W	D	L	Win %
Fløy	16 June 2018	16 Jule 2021	122	62	27	33	50.82
Radnički Niš	12 June 2023	14 November 2023	15	4	4	7	26.67
Radnički Niš	5 January 2024	9 March 2024	5	2	0	3	40.00
Novi Pazar	1 June 2024	26 August 2024	5	1	1	3	20.00
Mladost Lučani	18 October 2024	2025	13	4	5	4	30.77
Career total			161	73	37	51	45.34

== Honours ==
Red Star Belgrade

- Serbian SuperLiga: 2005–06, 2006–07
- Serbian Cup: 2005–06, 2006–07

Győr

- Nemzeti Bajnokság I: 2012–13
- Szuperkupa: 2013

== Personal life ==
He is in a relationship Norwegian handball Olympic, World and European Champion Katrine Lunde.
