= Leandro Antonio Martínez =

Argentine-Italian footballer

Leandro Martínez
Personal information
- Full name: Leandro Antonio Martínez
- Date of birth: 15 October 1989 (age 37)
- Place of birth: Buenos Aires, Argentina
- Height: 1.79 m (5 ft 10 1/2 in)
- Positions: Forward; winger

Team information
- Current team: Borgo San Donnino FC

Youth career
- Parma

Senior career*
Years	Team	Apps	(Gls)
2008–2010	Parma	1	(0)
2008–2009	→ Ternana (loan)	0	(0)
2009	→ Carpenedolo (loan)	6	(0)
2009	→ South Tyrol (loan)	5	(0)
2010	Biaschesi	8	(2)
2010–2012	AlbinoLeffe	13	(1)
2012–2013	Cremonese	12	(0)
2013	Budapest Honvéd	11	(6)
2013–2015	Győri ETO	25	(6)
2015–2017	Haladás	30	(7)
2016	→ Lucchese (loan)	11	(1)
2017	→ MTK Budapest (loan)	6	(0)
2019	Talleres RE	1	(0)
2019	GS Felino		
2019–	Borgo San Donnino FC		

International career
2008–2009	Italy U20	3	(0)
- * Club domestic league appearances and goals as of 18:23, 19 January 2020 (UTC)

Leandro Antonio Martínez (born 15 October 1989) is an Argentine-Italian footballer who most recently played as a forward for Borgo San Donnino FC.

== Biography ==
=== Parma and loans ===
Born in Buenos Aires, Argentina, Martínez moved to Italy in 2003. He was a member of Parma's Primavera under-20 team. At age 18, he was offered a professional contract of reported 5-year (or 3+2 years, as N.O.I.F. of FIGC only allowed a maximum of 3-year for Italians "young professional"). He made his Serie A debut on 27 April 2008, replaced Cristiano Lucarelli at 2nd half, at that time Parma already losing to Reggina 1–2. His primavera team-mate Aleksandar Prijović also substituted Daniele Dessena on that match, and Parma eventually 1–2 lost with Reggina. Parma relegated to Serie B in June and Martínez was loaned to Ternana in August 2008. He failed to make his club debut and left the club for Carpenedolo in January 2009. On 1 September 2009 he left for South Tyrol but in December 2009 returned to Parma for family reason. In January 2010 he left for Swiss 1. Liga side Biaschesi.

=== AlbinoLeffe ===
On 12 July 2010, he was signed by Serie B side AlbinoLeffe for free. Since AlbinoLeffe had lost Francesco Ruopolo and Marco Cellini, Martínez formed a new striking line with Karamoko Cissé and Omar Torri, who played as backup players for AlbinoLeffe in the last season. The latter 2 scored 3 goals in the opening match, making AlbinoLeffe won fellow Serie B club Pescara 3–1 in Coppa Italia. However, Martínez soon dropped from starting line-up.

Martínez did not play any game in 2011–12 Serie B and followed by the club relegation and heavy fine due to 2011 Italian football scandal, Martínez was signed by Cremonese in August 2012.

=== Hungary ===
On 31 January 2013 his contract was terminated in a mutual consent and moved to Hungarian side Budapest Honvéd on the same day. He was presented on 1 February. After spending five months at the club he joined defending champion Győri ETO.

On 20 January 2015 he moved to Haladás. He left the club in December 2017.

=== Return to Italy ===
After one month and a half at Talleres de Remedios de Escalada in Argentina, Italien club GS Felino announced on 29 October 2019, that he had joined the club. Leandros brother, Emanuel, was also playing for Felino and as of Leandro's Instagram page, he also worked as a youth coach at the club.

On 12 December 2019, Martínez joined Borgo San Donnino FC alongside his brother, Emanuel.

== International career ==
Martínez made his U20 debut on 10 September 2008 against Switzerland U20, a 2008–09 Four Nations Tournament match.
