= Krisztián Pogacsics =

Hungarian Slovene footballer

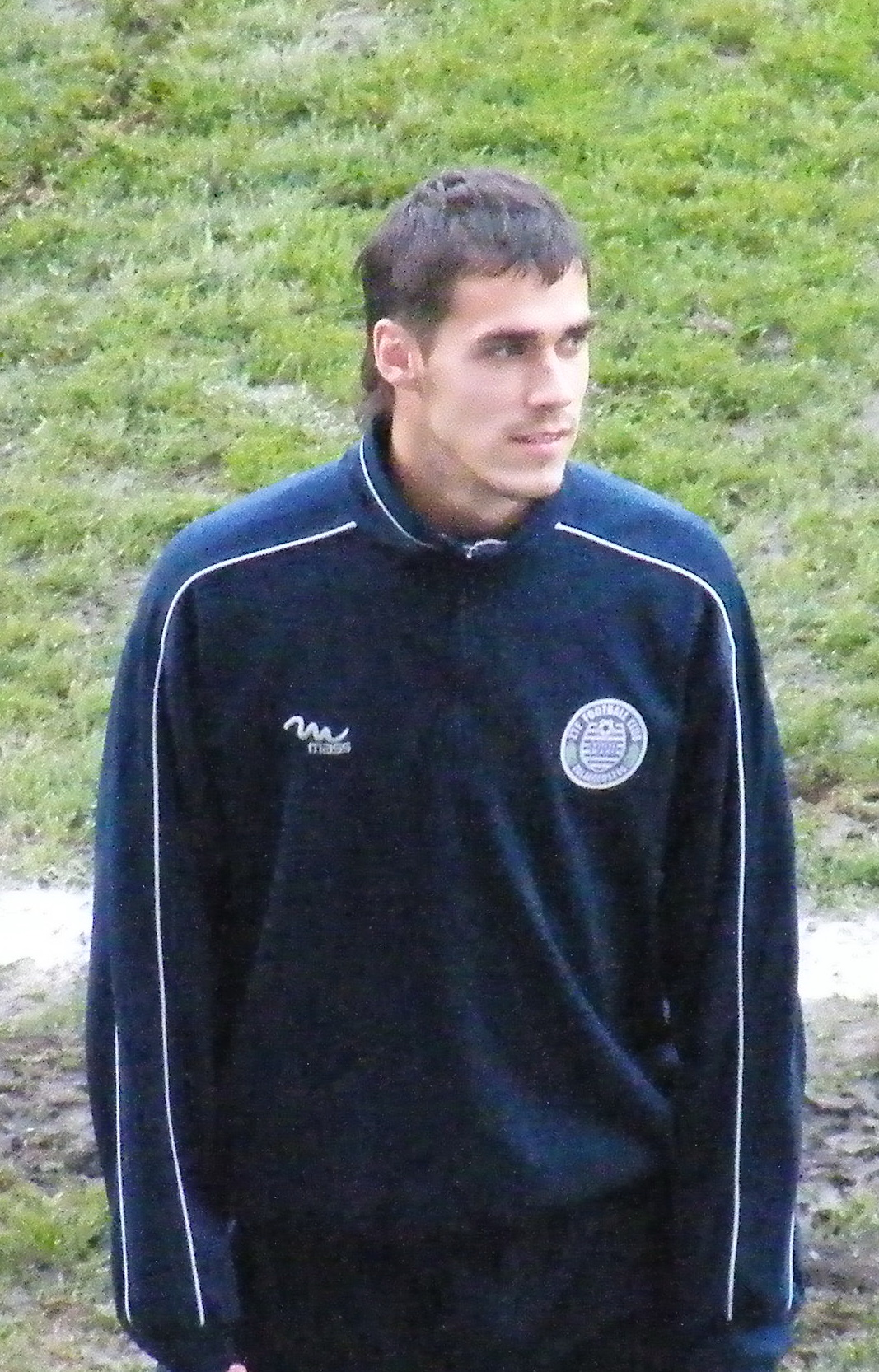

Personal information
- Full name: Krisztián Pogacsics
- Date of birth: 17 October 1985 (age 41)
- Place of birth: Zalaegerszeg, Hungary
- Height: 1.85 m (6 ft 1 in)
- Position: Goalkeeper

Team information
- Current team: Kaposvár
- Number: 1

Youth career
- 2002–2005: Zalaegerszeg
- 2005–2006: Keszthely

Senior career*
Years	Team	Apps	(Gls)
2006–2011	Zalaegerszeg	9	(0)
2006–2011	Zalaegerszeg II	65	(0)
2007	→ Andráshida (loan)	14	(0)
2011–2015	Bihor Oradea	38	(0)
2012	→ Panionios (loan)	1	(0)
2013–2014	→ Săgeata Năvodari (loan)	2	(0)
2014–2015	→ Győri ETO (loan)	11	(0)
2015–2017	Puskás	29	(0)
2017–2018	Balmazújváros	7	(0)
2018–	Kaposvár	46	(0)
- * Club domestic league appearances and goals as of 27 June 2020

Krisztián Pogacsics (Slovene: Kristijan Pogačič; born 17 October 1985) is a Hungarian Slovene football player who currently plays for Puskás Akadémia FC.

== Career statistics ==
Appearances and goals by club, season and competition
Club	Season	League			Cup		League Cup		Europe		Total	
Club	Season	Division	Apps	Goals	Apps	Goals	Apps	Goals	Apps	Goals	Apps	Goals
Zalaegerszeg
Zalaegerszeg	2007–08	Nemzeti Bajnoksag I	3	0	0	0	11	0	—		14	0
Zalaegerszeg	2008–09	Nemzeti Bajnokság I	4	0	1	0	3	0	—		8	0
Zalaegerszeg	2009–10	Nemzeti Bajnokság I	2	0	0	0	6	0	—		8	0
Zalaegerszeg	Total		9	0	1	0	20	0	0	0	30	0
Bihor Oradea
Bihor Oradea	2010–11	Liga II	13	0	0	0	—		—		13	0
Bihor Oradea	2011–12	Liga II	15	0	0	0	—		—		15	0
Bihor Oradea	2012–13	Liga II	10	0	0	0	—		—		10	0
Bihor Oradea	Total		38	0	0	0	—		—		38	0
Panionios	2011–12	Super League Greece	1	0	0	0	—		—		1	0
Săgeata Năvodari	2013–14	Liga I	4	0	1	0	—		—		5	0
Győr
Győr	2013–14	Nemzeti Bajnokság I	1	0	0	0	1	0	—		2	0
Győr	2014–15	Nemzeti Bajnokság I	11	0	2	0	2	0	0	0	15	0
Győr	Total		12	0	3	0	2	0	0	0	17	0
Puskás Akadémia
Puskás Akadémia	2015–16	Nemzeti Bajnokság I	27	0	0	0	—		—		27	0
Puskás Akadémia	2016–17	Nemzeti Bajnokság II	2	0	3	0	—		—		5	0
Puskás Akadémia	Total		29	0	3	0	—		—		32	0
Balmazújváros	2017–18	Nemzeti Bajnokság I	7	0	3	0	—		—		10	0
Kaposvár
Kaposvár	2018–19	Nemzeti Bajnokság II	18	0	0	0	—		—		18	0
Kaposvár	2019–20	Nemzeti Bajnokság I	28	0	1	0	—		—		29	0
Kaposvár	Total		46	0	1	0	—		—		47	0
Career total			146	0	12	0	22	0	0	0	180	0

Updated to games played as of 27 June 2020.
