= Tamás Koltai (footballer, born 1987) =

Hungarian footballer

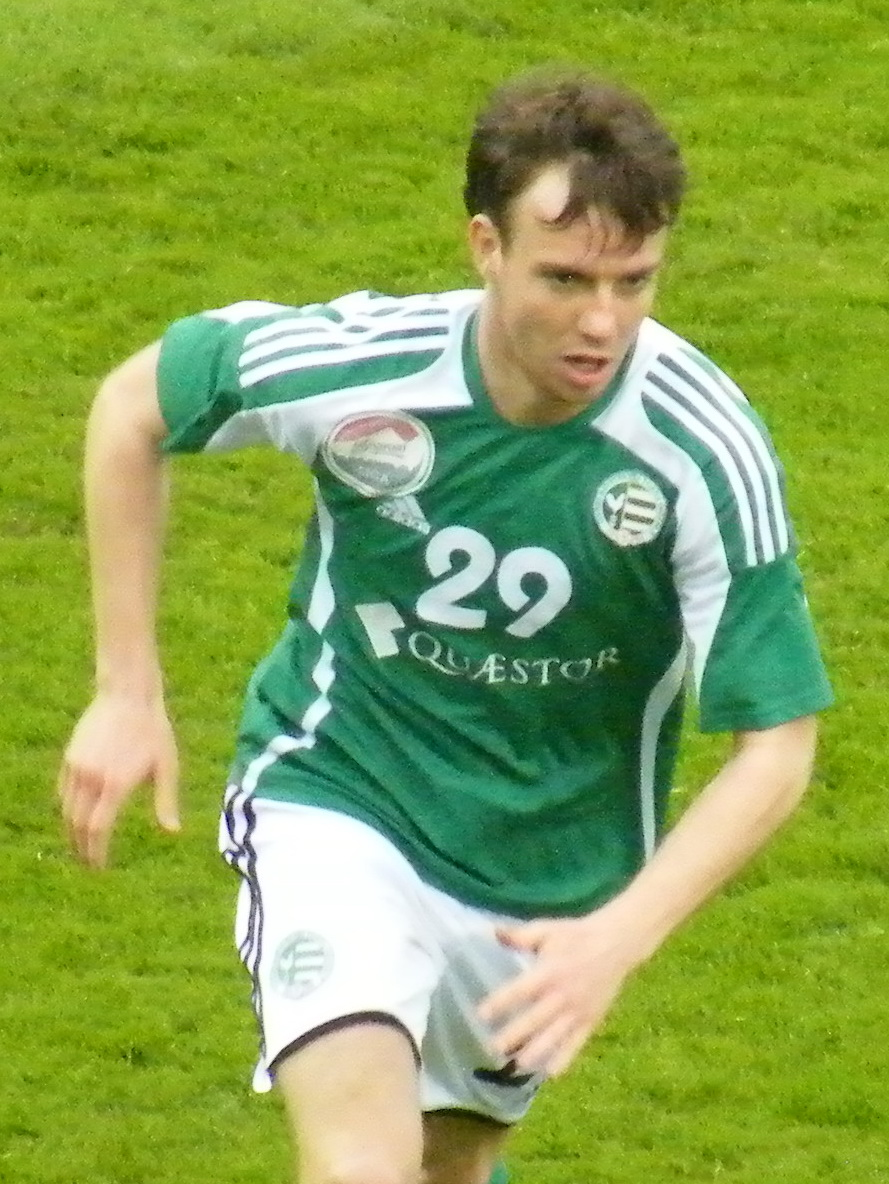

Personal information
- Date of birth: 30 April 1987 (age 39)
- Place of birth: Győr, Hungary
- Height: 1.83 m (6 ft 0 in)
- Position: Winger

Team information
- Current team: Gyirmót
- Number: 7

Youth career
- 2001–2005: Győr

Senior career*
Years	Team	Apps	(Gls)
2005–2006	Mosonmagyaróvár	9	(0)
2007–2015	Győr	164	(29)
2015–2016	Videoton	2	(0)
2015–2016	→ Paks (loan)	25	(1)
2016–2018	Paks	41	(3)
2018	Győr	13	(2)
2019–	Gyirmót	5	(0)

International career
2008–2012	Hungary	12	(0)
- * Club domestic league appearances and goals as of 20:19, 20 May 2019 (UTC)

Tamás Koltai (born 30 April 1987) is a Hungarian football player who plays for Gyirmót FC Győr.

Koltai was born in Győr, and made his debut on 24 May 2008, in Budapest against Greece.

== Career statistics ==
Appearances and goals by club, season and competition
Club	Season	League		Cup		League Cup		Europe		Total	
Club	Season	Apps	Goals	Apps	Goals	Apps	Goals	Apps	Goals	Apps	Goals
Mosonmagyaróvár
Mosonmagyaróvár	2005–06	9	0	0	0	0	0	0	0	9	0
Mosonmagyaróvár	Total	9	0	0	0	0	0	0	0	9	0
Győr
Győr	2007–08	18	2	2	0	12	3	0	0	32	5
Győr	2008–09	16	1	3	0	0	0	4	0	23	1
Győr	2009–10	24	4	3	2	9	1	0	0	36	7
Győr	2010–11	29	3	2	2	1	0	8	0	40	5
Győr	2011–12	26	6	5	3	2	0	0	0	33	9
Győr	2012–13	20	8	3	0	1	0	0	0	24	8
Győr	2013–14	6	1	0	0	0	0	2	0	8	1
Győr	2014–15	24	4	3	0	3	1	2	0	33	5
Győr	Total	164	29	21	7	28	5	16	0	229	41
Videoton
Videoton	2015–16	2	0	0	0	–	–	2	0	4	0
Videoton	Total	2	0	0	0	0	0	2	0	4	0
Paks
Paks	2015–16	25	1	1	0	–	–	–	–	26	1
Paks	2016–17	26	3	2	0	–	–	–	–	28	3
Paks	2017–18	13	0	0	0	–	–	–	–	13	0
Paks	Total	64	4	3	0	0	0	0	0	67	4
Career total		239	33	24	7	28	5	18	0	309	45

Updated to games played as of 9 December 2017.
