= Lazar Stanišić =

Serbian footballer

Personal information
- Full name: Lazar Stanišić
- Date of birth: July 5, 1984 (age 42)
- Place of birth: Vinkovci, SR Croatia, SFR Yugoslavia
- Height: 1.87 m (6 ft 2 in)
- Position: Centre back

Team information
- Current team: DAC 1912
- Number: 17

Senior career*
Years	Team	Apps	(Gls)
1999–2007	Mačva Šabac	82	
2007–2008	Rabotnički	22	(2)
2008–2009	Vardar	9	(0)
2009–2015	Győr	65	(1)
2015–2016	Tatabánya	22	(0)
2016–2018	SC/ESV Parndorf	40	(3)
2018–2019	SC/ESV Parndorf II	26	(1)
2019–2020	FC Andau	13	(2)
2020–	DAC 1912	20	(1)
- * Club domestic league appearances and goals as of 11:27, 1 August 2021 (UTC)

Lazar Stanišić (Serbian Cyrillic: Лазар Станишић; born 5 July 1984) is a Serbian footballer who plays as a centre back for Hungarian club DAC 1912.

== Career ==
Stanišić was born in Vinkovci, SR Croatia, SFR Yugoslavia.

He began his career with FK Mačva Šabac before joining Macedonian club FK Rabotnički in June 2007. After one year with Rabotnicki he moved to FK Vardar.

He left FK Vardar in January 2009 to join Győri ETO FC.

== Honours ==
As player:

- FK Rabotnički
  - Macedonian League:
    - Winner: 2007-08
  - Macedonian Cup:
    - Winner: 2007-08
- Győri ETO FC
  - Hungarian League:
    - Winner: 2012-13
  - Hungarian Cup:
    - Runner-up: 2013
  - Hungarian SuperCup:
    - Winner: 2013
