= Máté Pátkai =

Hungarian footballer

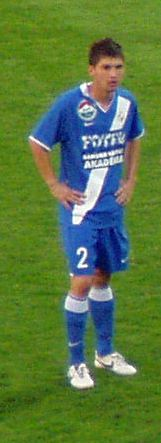
- Pátkai in 2008

Personal information
- Full name: Máté Pátkai
- Date of birth: 6 March 1988 (age 38)
- Place of birth: Budapest, Hungary
- Height: 1.72 m (5 ft 7 1/2 in)
- Position: Midfielder

Senior career*
Years	Team	Apps	(Gls)
2006–2011	MTK	101	(15)
2012–2015	Győr	89	(21)
2015–2020	Fehérvár	147	(15)
2020–2023	Vasas	63	(10)
Total		400	(61)

International career
2009	Hungary U21	1	(0)
2012–2019	Hungary	23	(2)
- * Club domestic league appearances and goals

Máté Pátkai (born 6 March 1988) is a Hungarian former football player who played as a midfielder.

== Club career ==
=== MTK Budapest ===
Pátkai started his club career in MTK Budapest FC where he scored 15 goals in 101 matches.

=== Győr ===
Pátkai was purchased by Győri ETO FC in 2012.

== Career statistics ==
Appearances and goals by club, season and competition
Club	Season	League		Cup		League Cup		Europe		Total	
Club	Season	Apps	Goals	Apps	Goals	Apps	Goals	Apps	Goals	Apps	Goals
MTK
MTK	2006–07	3	1	2	0	0	0	0	0	5	1
MTK	2007–08	28	5	0	0	7	0	0	0	35	5
MTK	2008–09	23	6	3	1	2	0	1	0	29	7
MTK	2009–10	20	1	4	0	2	0	0	0	26	1
MTK	2010–11	27	2	4	3	1	0	0	0	32	5
MTK	Total	101	15	13	4	12	0	1	0	127	19
Győr
Győr	2011–12	12	6	2	0	0	0	0	0	14	6
Győr	2012–13	26	1	7	1	2	0	0	0	35	2
Győr	2013–14	23	7	5	1	4	1	1	0	33	9
Győr	2014–15	28	7	4	1	1	0	2	0	35	8
Győr	Total	89	21	18	3	7	1	3	0	117	25
Videoton
Videoton	2015–16	29	1	5	0	–	–	4	0	38	1
Videoton	2016–17	31	3	0	0	–	–	5	0	36	3
Videoton	2017–18	28	5	1	0	–	–	7	1	36	6
Videoton	2018–19	32	5	8	0	–	–	12	0	52	5
Videoton	2019–20	25	1	7	1	–	–	4	0	36	2
Videoton	2020–21	2	0	1	0	–	–	2	0	5	0
Videoton	Total	147	15	22	1	–	–	34	1	203	17
Vasas
Vasas	2020–21	23	2	2	0	–	–	–	–	25	2
Vasas	2021–22	0	0	0	0	–	–	–	–	0	0
Vasas	Total	23	2	2	0	–	–	–	–	25	2
Career total		360	53	55	8	19	1	38	2	472	64

Updated to games played as of 1 June 2021.

== Honours ==
MTK

- Nemzeti Bajnokság I: 2007-08
- Hungarian Super Cup: 2008

Győri ETO FC

- Nemzeti Bajnokság I: 2012-13
- Hungarian Super Cup: 2013

Videoton

- Nemzeti Bajnokság I: 2017-18
- Hungarian Cup: 2018-19

== International career ==
On 16 October 2012 Hungary battled back to beat Turkey at home 3–1. Pátkai was substituted for Elek in the break of the match.

=== International goals ===
Scores and results list Hungary's goal tally first.

No.	Date	Venue	Opponent	Score	Result	Competition
1.	24 March 2019	Groupama Arena, Budapest, Hungary	Croatia	2–1	2–1	UEFA Euro 2020 qualification
2.	11 June 2019	Groupama Arena, Budapest, Hungary	Wales	1–0	1–0	UEFA Euro 2020 qualification
