= Ádám Dudás =

Hungarian footballer

Personal information
- Full name: Ádám Dudás
- Date of birth: 12 February 1989 (age 37)
- Place of birth: Esztergom, Hungary
- Height: 1.82 m (6 ft 0 in)
- Position: Right midfielder

Team information
- Current team: Haladás

Senior career*
Years	Team	Apps	(Gls)
2005–2015	Győr	95	(13)
2007	→ Spartak Moscow (loan)	0	(0)
2010	→ Paks (loan)	1	(0)
2015–	Haladás	0	(0)

International career
2009	Hungary U-20	5	(0)
2006–2010	Hungary U-21	?	(?)
- * Club domestic league appearances and goals as of 31 August 2014

Ádám Dudás (born 12 February 1989) is a Hungarian footballer who played for Szombathelyi Haladás.

The right forward reached the Elite Round with the Hungarian U17 team on the UEFA U-17 Championship 2006 in Luxembourg. As a result of his performance he was chosen into the European U17 Team to play at the 2007 Meridian Cup against Africa's best eleven.

After unsuccessful trials with Arsenal and Rangers F.C., he was loaned to Spartak Moscow with prospect for a permanent deal, but in the winter 2007/2008 he returned to Győri ETO after he played only in 6 matches for Spartak reserves.

== Honours ==
- FIFA U-20 World Cup:
  - Third place: 2009
- Named in the Europe U-18 Team: 2007
