= Vladimir Đorđević =

Serbian footballer

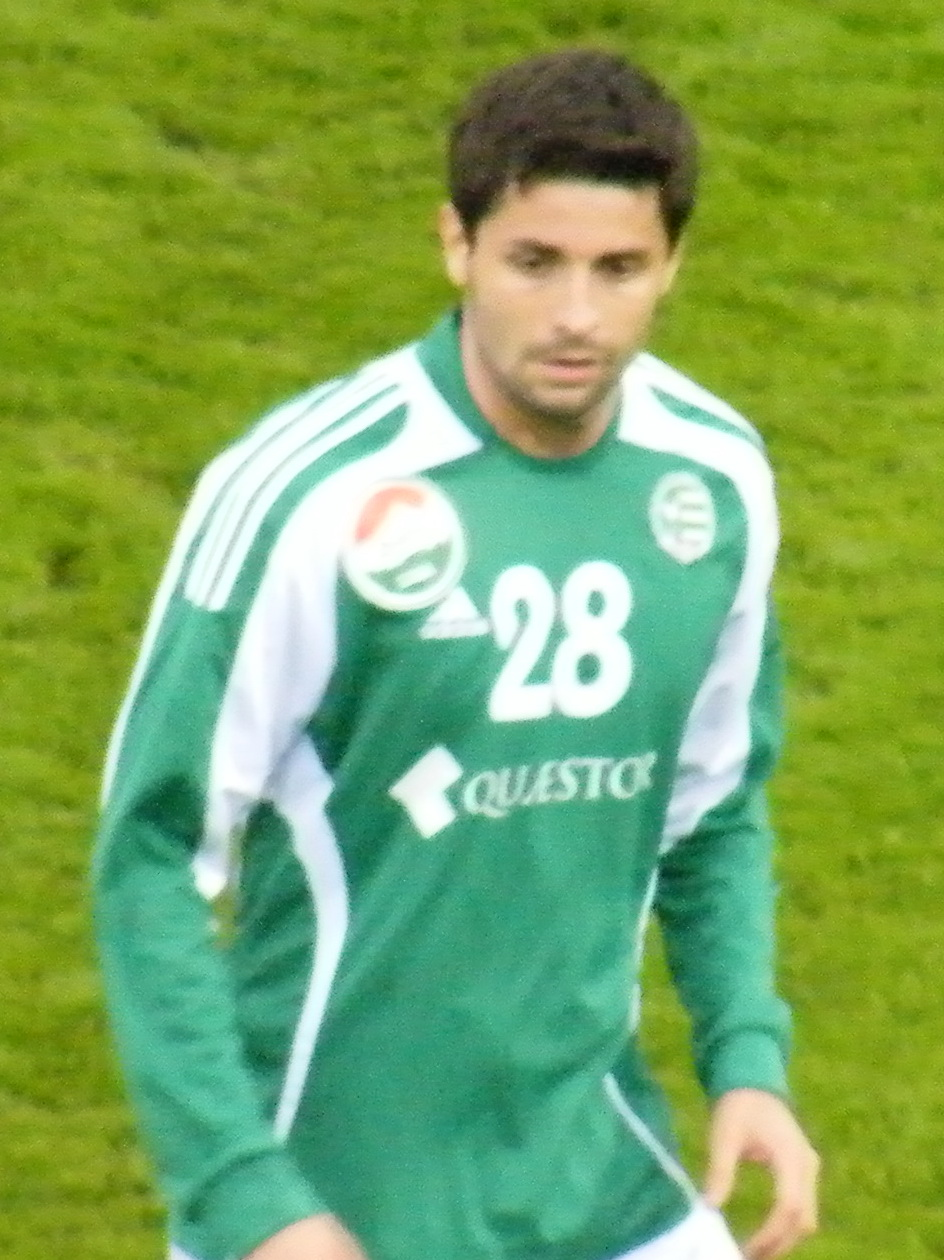
- Đorđević with Győr in 2010

Personal information
- Full name: Vladimir Đorđević
- Date of birth: 25 December 1982 (age 43)
- Place of birth: Niš, SFR Yugoslavia
- Height: 1.86 m (6 ft 1 in)
- Position: Defender

Youth career
- Radnički Niš

Senior career*
Years	Team	Apps	(Gls)
2001–2005	Radnički Niš	74	(1)
2006	Fluminense	3	(0)
2007–2008	Red Star Belgrade	7	(0)
2009–2014	Győr	71	(4)
2010–2014	Győr II	8	(0)
2014–2016	Radnički Niš	27	(3)

Managerial career
- 2023: Radnički Niš (caretaker)
- * Club domestic league appearances and goals as of 21 June 2016

Vladimir Đorđević (Serbian Cyrillic: Владимир Ђорђевић; also transliterated Vladimir Djordjević; born 25 December 1982) is a Serbian retired footballer who plays as a defender.

== Career ==
Đorđević came through the youth system of Radnički Niš, before breaking into the senior squad in the early 2000s. He was transferred to Brazilian club Fluminense in early 2006. After a year abroad, Đorđević returned to his homeland and joined Red Star Belgrade in January 2007. He won a double in his debut season with the club. In early 2009, Đorđević moved to Hungarian club Győr, collecting a league title medal in the 2012–13 season. In the summer of 2014, Đorđević returned to his parent club Radnički Niš.

== Honours ==
Red Star Belgrade

- Serbian SuperLiga: 2006–07
- Serbian Cup: 2006–07

Győr

- Nemzeti Bajnokság I: 2012–13
