= ETO Park =

Stadium in Győr, Hungary

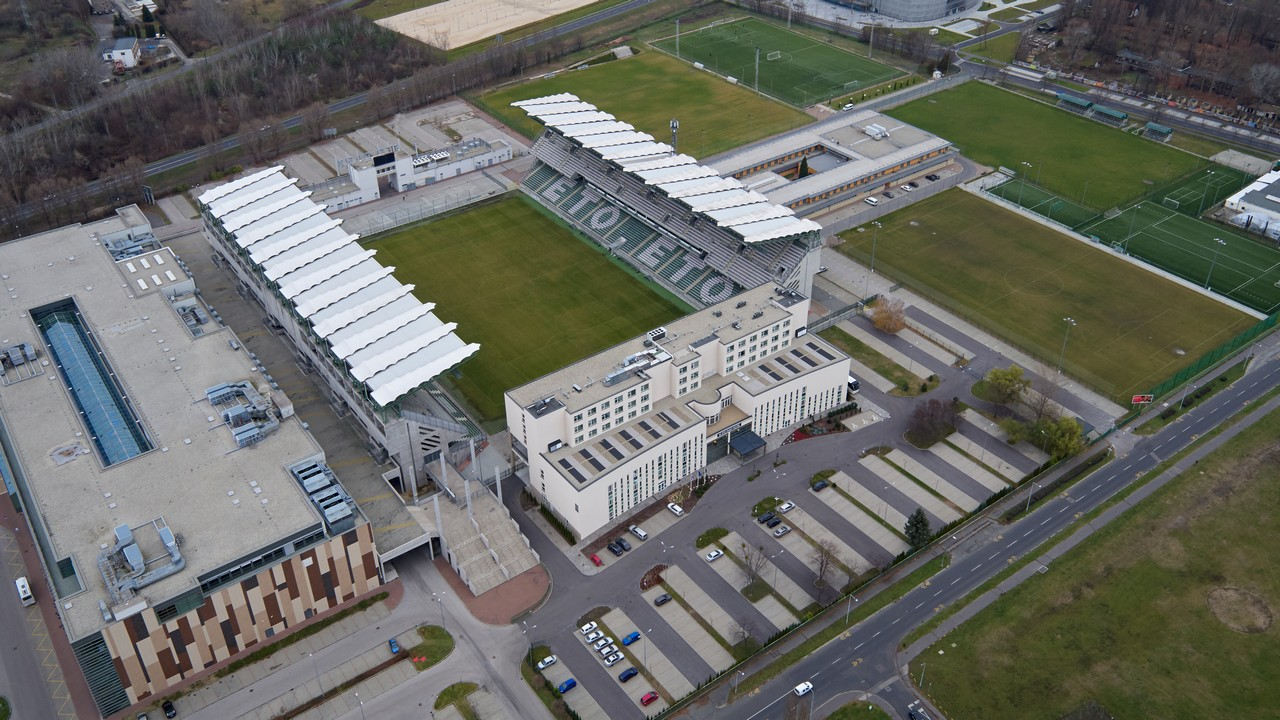
- Interactive map of ETO Park
- Location: Győr, Hungary
- Coordinates: 47.6958°N 17.6638°E
- Capacity: 15,600
- Surface: grass
- Record attendance: 13,700 (Győr v Ferencváros; 12 May 2013)

Construction
- Opened: 2008

Tenant
- Győri ETO

Website
- www.etopark.hu

ETO Park is a multi-use stadium in Győr, Hungary. It is primarily used for football and is home to Győri ETO. Opened in 2008 as a replacement for Stadion ETO, the stadium has a capacity of 15,600.

The stadium complex also includes three grass practice pitches and one synthetic practice pitch, as well as two indoor pitches.

== History ==
On 26 February 2011, it was announced that the sectors of the stadium will be named after 40 legendary former Győr players.

On 17 October 2012, the ETO Park Hotel was opened. At the opening ceremony Zsolt Borkai, mayor of Győr and Péter Szijjártó, Hungarian MP were present.

On 8 July 2013, it was announced that on 11 August 2013 Győr will host Bayern Munich in order to celebrate the 20th anniversary of the Audi Hungaria Motor Kft.

== Milestone matches ==
Match	Home	Result	Opponent	Date	Competition
First match	(Hungary) Győr				Friendly match
First Hungarian League match	(Hungary) Győr		(Hungary)		
First Hungarian Cup match	(Hungary) Győr				
First Hungarian League Cup match	(Hungary) Győr				
First UEFA Europa League match	(Hungary) Győr				
First UEFA Champions League match	(Hungary) Győr	0–2	(Israel) Maccabi Tel Aviv	17 July 2013	UEFA Champions League 2013-14
First Audi Cup match	(Hungary) Győr	1–4	(Germany) Bayern Munich	11 August 2013	Audi Motors Hungaria

== International matches ==
No.	Date	Home	Result	Away	Competition
1.	3 March 2010	Hungary	1–1	Russia	Friendly
2.	29 February 2012	Hungary	1–1	Bulgaria	Friendly
3.	6 June 2013	Hungary	1–0	Kuwait	Friendly
4.	5 March 2014	Hungary	1–2	Finland	Friendly

== Attendances ==
As of 11 April 2017.

Season	Average
2008–09	3,147
2009–10	2,773
2010–11	2,300
2011–12	4,467
2012–13	4,627
2013–14	2,927
2014–15	2,725
2015–16	1,750
2016–17	1,237

== Gallery ==
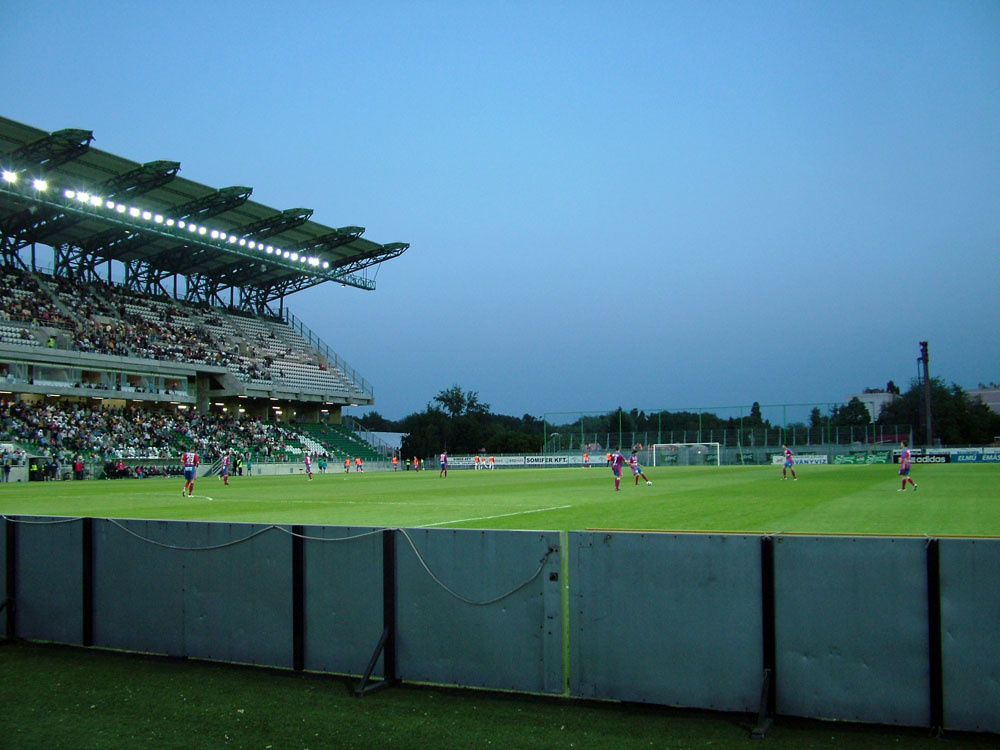
Győr-Vasas on 1 May 2009 in the 2008-09 Nemzeti Bajnokság I season

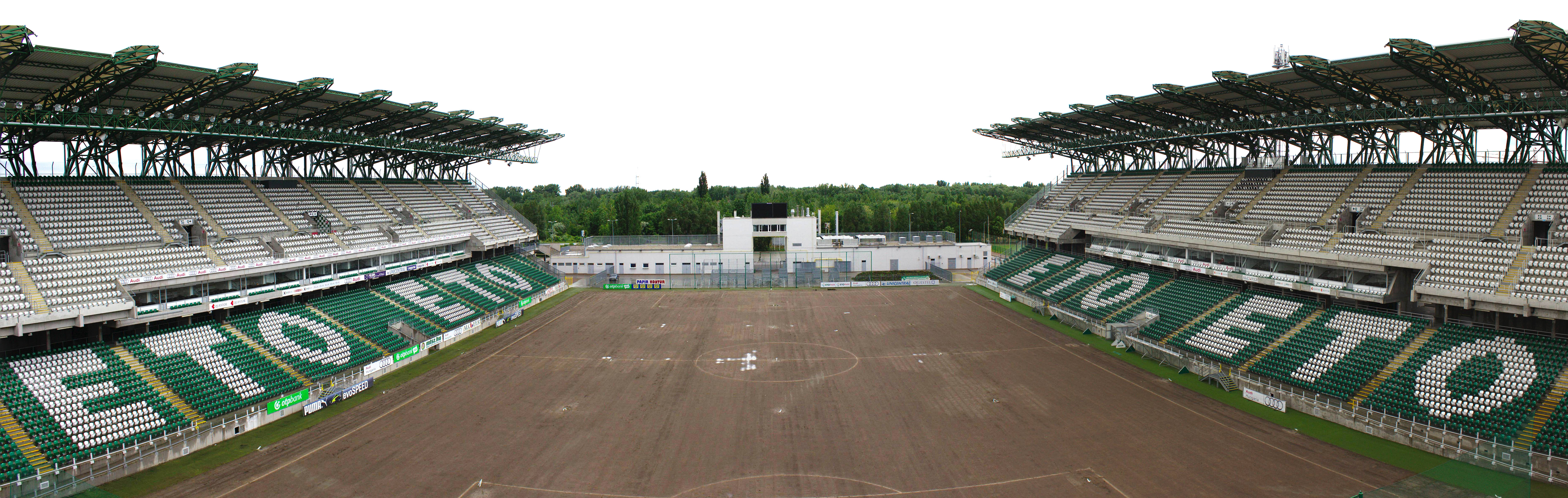
View of ETO Park stadium from ETO Park hotel

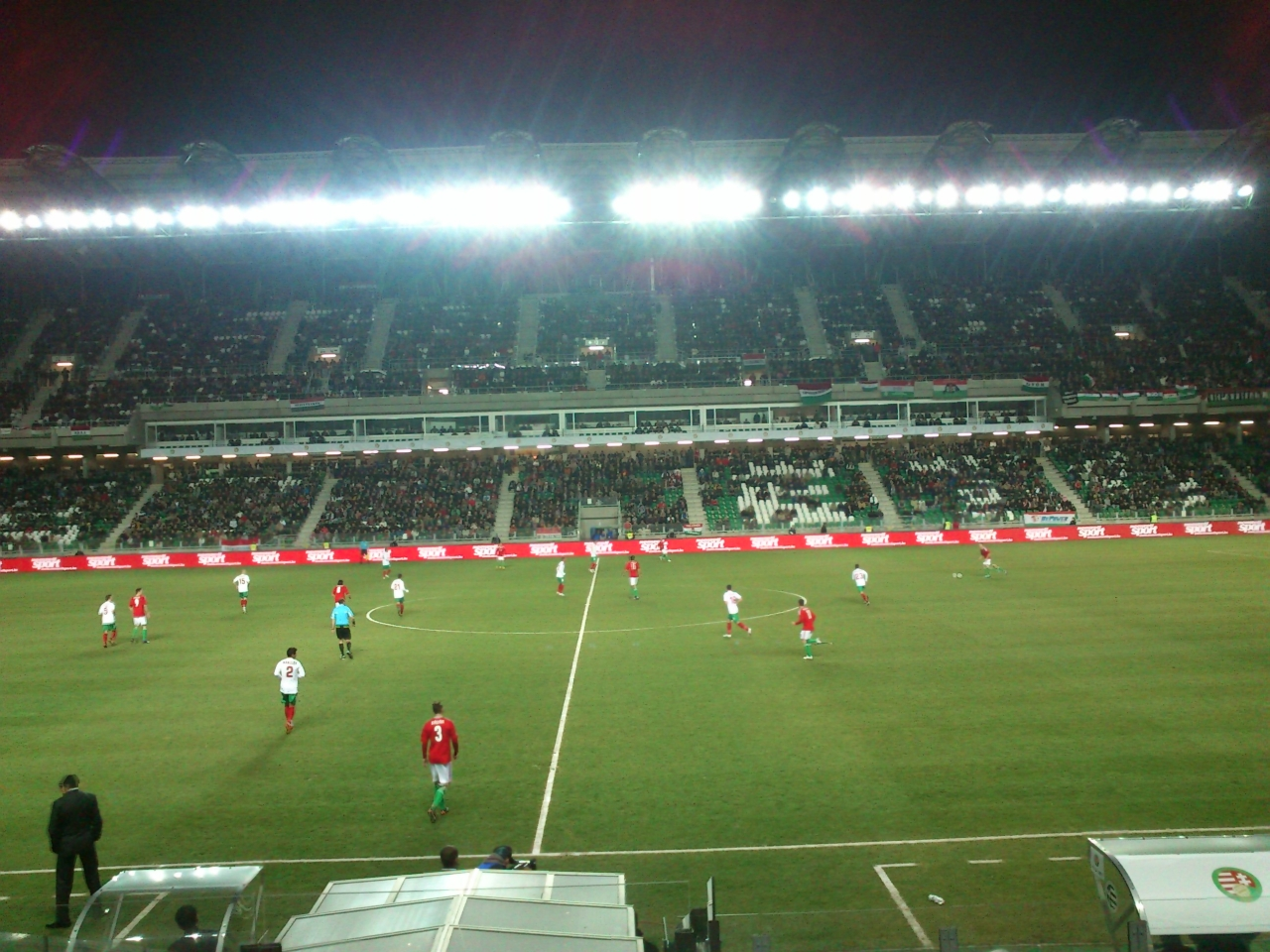
ETO Park during a friendly international match between Hungary and Bulgaria

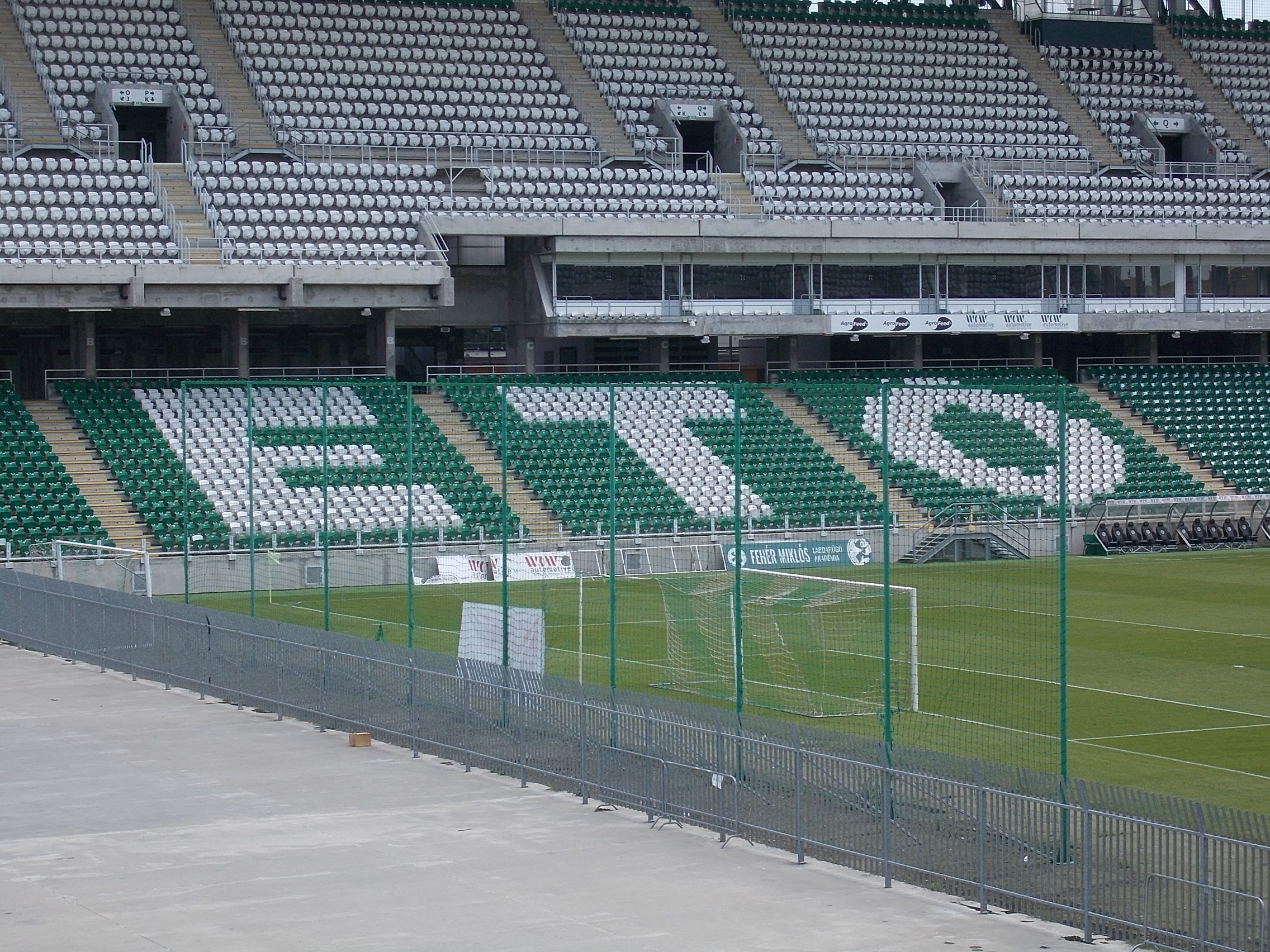

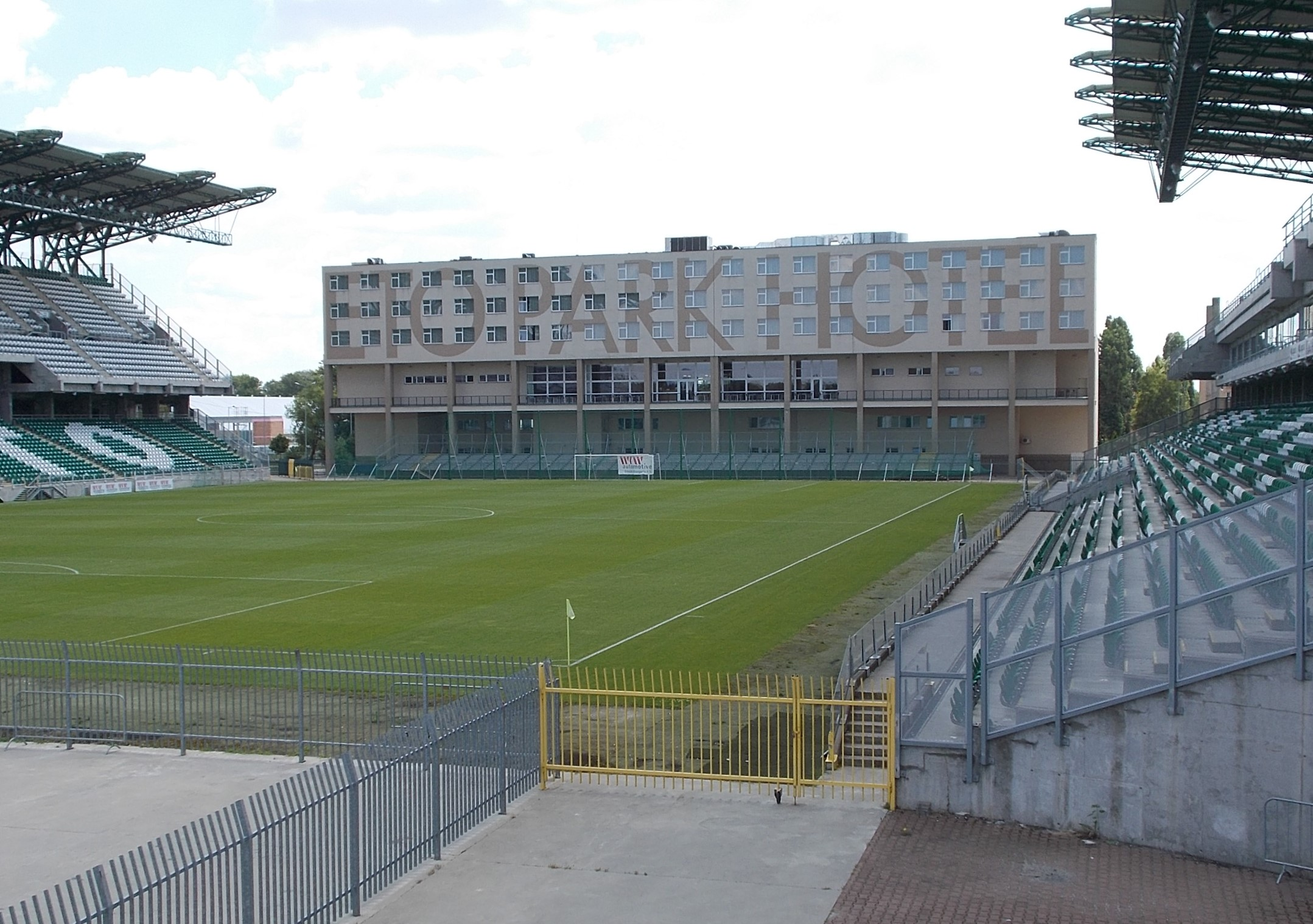
The ETO Park hotel in the background

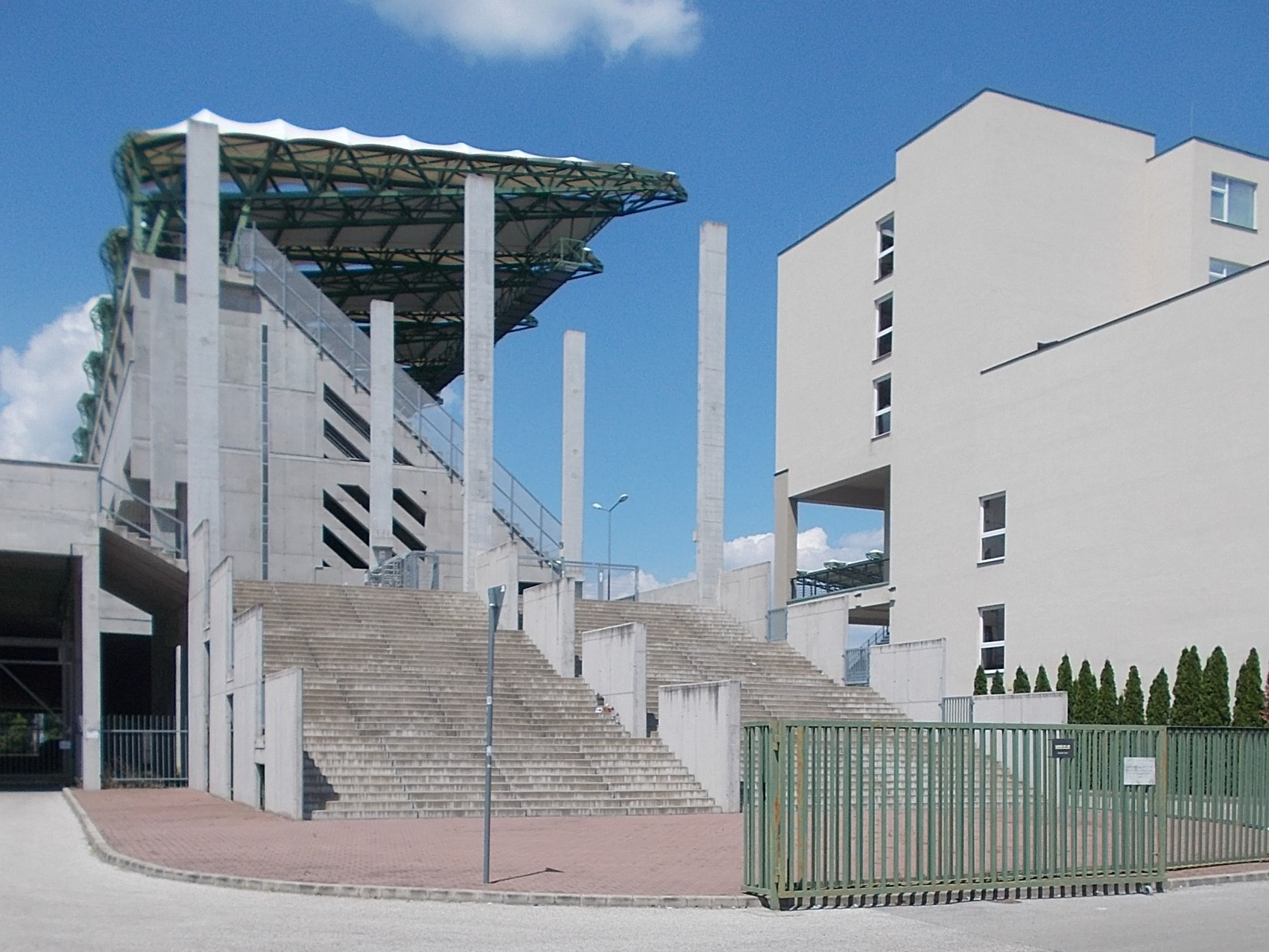
Next to the hotel
