= Dávid Illés =

Footballer

Personal information
- Date of birth: 18 February 1994 (age 32)
- Place of birth: Győr, Hungary
- Height: 1.84 m (6 ft 0 in)
- Position: Midfielder

Team information
- Current team: Mosonmagyaróvár
- Number: 17

Youth career
- 2004–2014: Győr

Senior career*
Years	Team	Apps	(Gls)
2014–2017	Győr	2	(0)
2013–2016	→ Győr II	70	(18)
2015	→ Lombard Pápa (loan)	0	(0)
2017	Budafok	15	(3)
2017–2020	Ajka	55	(13)
2020–	Mosonmagyaróvár	181	(36)

International career^{‡}
2010–2011	Hungary U17	1	(0)
- * Club domestic league appearances and goals as of 14 January 2026 ‡ National team caps and goals as of 1 June 2014

Dávid Illés (born 18 February 1994) is a Hungarian football player who plays for Mosonmagyaróvár in the Hungarian NB III (third tier).

== Career statistics ==
Appearances and goals by club, season and competition
Club	Season	League			Cup		League Cup		Europe		Total	
Club	Season	Division	Apps	Goals	Apps	Goals	Apps	Goals	Apps	Goals	Apps	Goals
Győr	2013–14	Nemzeti Bajnokság I	1	0	1	0	1	0	0	0	3	0
Győr	2014–15	Nemzeti Bajnokság I	1	0	0	0	6	0	1	0	8	0
Career total			2	0	1	0	7	0	1	0	11	0

Updated to games played as of 2 December 2014.
