= Rafe Wolfe =

Jamaican footballer (born 1985)

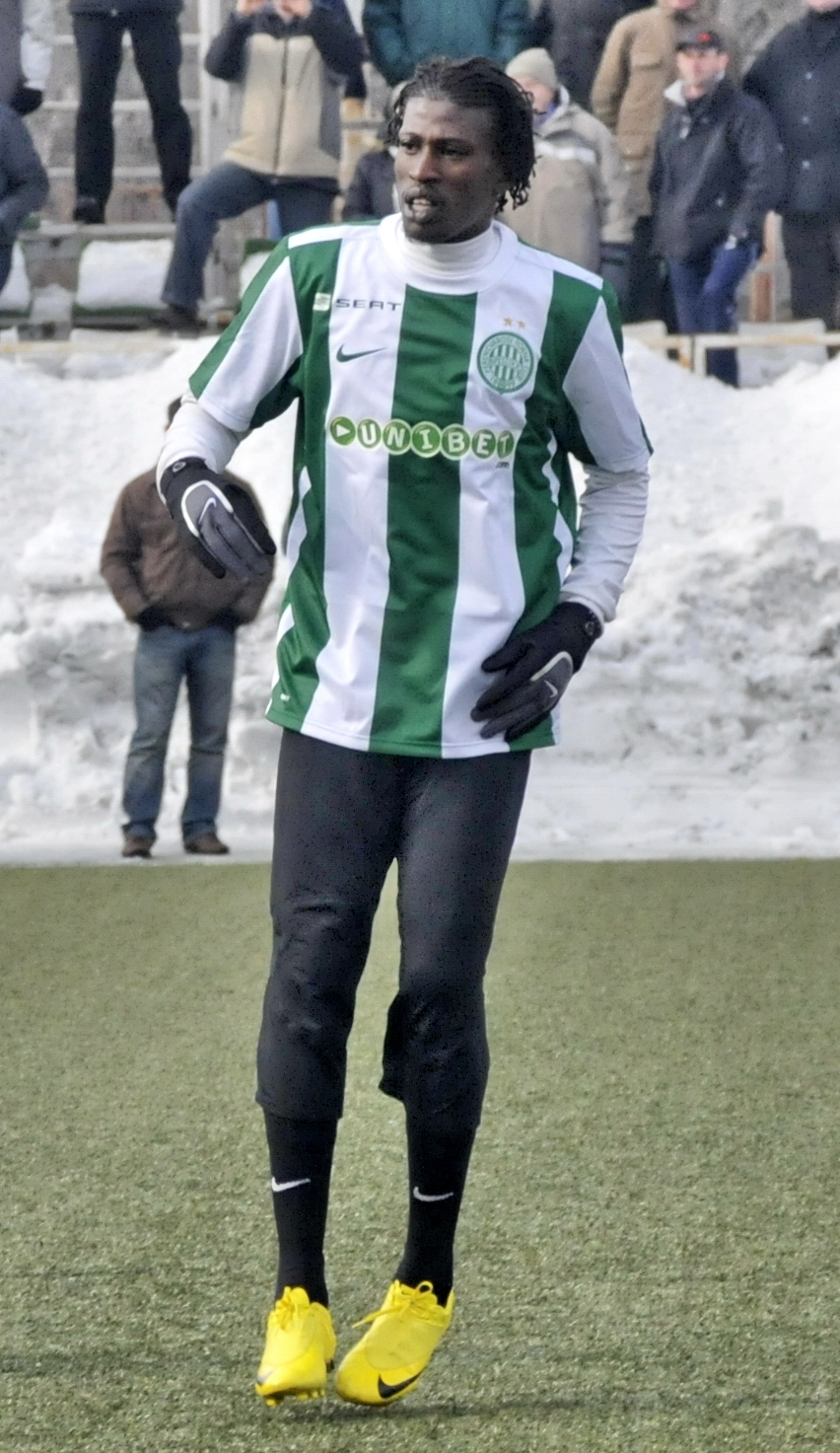
- Wolfe playing for Ferencváros

Personal information
- Full name: Rafe Raccini Wolfe
- Date of birth: 19 December 1985 (age 40)
- Place of birth: St Catherine, Jamaica
- Height: 1.87 m (6 ft 1 1/2 in)
- Position: Right back

Team information
- Current team: Humble Lions

Senior career*
Years	Team	Apps	(Gls)
2005–2007	Portmore United		
2007–2008	White Star Woluwe	26	(3)
2008–2010	Ferencváros	40	(2)
2010–2011	Portmore United		
2011–2013	MTK Budapest	53	(5)
2013–2015	Győri ETO	23	(3)
2015–2016	Dunaújváros		
2016–	Humble Lions	16	(0)

International career^{‡}
2008–2009	Jamaica	7	(1)
- * Club domestic league appearances and goals as of 25 February 2018 ‡ National team caps and goals as of 18:55, 12 March 2017 (UTC)

Rafe Raccini Wolfe (born 19 December 1985) is a Jamaican international footballer who plays professionally for Humble Lions, as a right back.

== Early and personal life ==
Born in St Catherine, Wolfe is the brother of Wolry Wolfe and Kemeel Wolfe, and the cousin of Omar Cummings.

== Club career ==
Wolfe has played in Jamaica, Belgium and Hungary for Portmore United, White Star Woluwe, Ferencváros, MTK Budapest, Győri ETO, Dunaújváros and Humble Lions.

== International career ==
Wolfe made his international debut for Jamaica in 2008, and earned a total of seven caps over two years, scoring once.

== Career statistics ==
As of 7 February 2022

Appearances and goals by club, season and competition
Club	Season	League			Cup		Continental		Other		Total	
Club	Season	Division	Apps	Goals	Apps	Goals	Apps	Goals	Apps	Goals	Apps	Goals
White Star Woluwe	2006–07	Belgian Third Division	8	0	—		—		—		8	0
White Star Woluwe	2007–08	Belgian Third Division	18	3	—		—		—		18	3
White Star Woluwe	Total		26	3	0	0	0	0	0	0	26	3
Ferencváros	2008–09	Nemzeti Bajnokság II	20	0	0	0	—		5	0	25	0
Ferencváros	2009–10	Nemzeti Bajnokság I	20	2	1	0	—		4	1	25	3
Ferencváros	Total		40	2	1	0	0	0	9	1	50	3
MTK Budapest	2010–11	Nemzeti Bajnokság I	5	0	0	0	—		0	0	5	0
MTK Budapest	2011–12	Nemzeti Bajnokság II	25	3	8	0	—		5	0	38	3
MTK Budapest	2012–13	Nemzeti Bajnokság I	24	2	0	0	2	0	0	0	26	2
MTK Budapest	Total	Nemzeti Bajnokság I	54	5	8	0	2	0	5	0	69	5
Győr	2013–14	Nemzeti Bajnokság I	14	3	3	0	1	0	7	0	25	3
Győr	2014–15	Nemzeti Bajnokság I	9	0	2	1	1	0	6	0	18	1
Győr	Total		23	3	5	1	2	0	13	0	43	4
Humble Lions	2016–17	National Premier League	5	0	0	0	—		0	0	5	0
Humble Lions	2017–18	National Premier League	10	0	0	0	—		0	0	10	0
Humble Lions	Total		15	0	0	0	0	0	0	0	15	0
Career total			158	13	14	1	4	0	27	1	203	15
