= Michal Švec =

Czech footballer

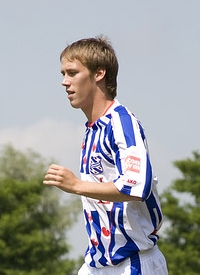

Personal information
- Date of birth: 19 March 1987 (age 39)
- Place of birth: Prague, Czechoslovakia
- Height: 1.81 m (5 ft 11 in)
- Position: Midfielder

Team information
- Current team: Slavia Prague U20

Senior career*
Years	Team	Apps	(Gls)
2003–2008	Slavia Prague	68	(2)
2008–2012	Heerenveen	80	(1)
2012–2014	Győr	53	(0)
2015–2016	Slavia Prague	14	(0)
2016–2019	Bohemians 1905	54	(0)
2019–2025	Slavia Prague B	78	(2)
2025–	Slavia Prague U20	0	(0)

International career
2005–2008	Czech Republic U21	14	(0)
2009	Czech Republic	2	(0)
- * Club domestic league appearances and goals as of 15 June 2025

Michal Švec (born 19 March 1987 in Prague) is a Czech footballer who plays for Slavia Prague U20. He is a central midfielder. He made his debut for the Czech Republic national team in 2009.

== Career ==
Ahead of the 2019–20 season, Švec returned to SK Slavia Prague to play for the clubs B-team.

== Honours ==
- KNVB Cup: 2009
