= Marko Dinjar =

Croatian football midfielder

Personal information
- Date of birth: 21 May 1986 (age 40)
- Place of birth: Osijek, SFR Yugoslavia
- Height: 1.74 m (5 ft 8 1/2 in)
- Position: Midfielder

Team information
- Current team: NK Vardarac

Youth career
- Osijek

Senior career*
Years	Team	Apps	(Gls)
2002–2008	Osijek	79	(6)
2008–2009	Terek Grozny	5	(0)
2009–2015	Győri ETO	105	(6)
2009–2014	→ Győri ETO II	10	(3)
2015–2016	Puskás	16	(0)
2016	→ Puskás II	2	(1)
2016	Kozármisleny	10	(1)
2017	Mezőkövesd	3	(0)
2017–2018	Szeged 2011	7	(0)
2018–2020	Vihor Jelisavac	5	(1)
2020–2021	NK Vardarac		

International career
2002	Croatia U16	8	(5)
2002–2003	Croatia U17	14	(7)
2004	Croatia U18	2	(0)
2003–2005	Croatia U19	14	(0)
2006–2007	Croatia U20	4	(0)
2006–2008	Croatia U21	13	(0)

Managerial career
- 2023–: NK Vardarac
- * Club domestic league appearances and goals

Marko Dinjar (born 21 May 1986) is a Croatian football coach and a former midfielder, currently with NK Vardarac. He also appeared for the Croatia national team at various youth levels.

== Club career ==
Dinjar started his career playing at youth level for his hometown club Osijek. He made his professional league debut in the 2002–03 Prva HNL season as a second-half substitute in an away match against Varteks on 10 August 2002. This made him the youngest debutant in the history of the league, at the age of 16 years and 82 days (5926 days), a record he held until March 2013 when Cibalia's Marko Dabro played in a match against RNK Split at the age of 16 years and 2 days.

In March 2008, Dinjar signed a four-year contract with Russian club Terek Grozny. In the summer of 2009, he joined Hungarian club Győri ETO.
