= Marián Had =

Slovak footballer

Personal information
- Date of birth: 16 September 1982 (age 44)
- Place of birth: Dolný Kubín, Czechoslovakia
- Height: 1.89 m (6 ft 2 1/2 in)
- Position: Defender

Youth career
- Dolný Kubín

Senior career*
Years	Team	Apps	(Gls)
2001–2004	Ružomberok	56	(2)
2004–2006	Zbrojovka Brno	24	(0)
2006–2009	Lokomotiv Moscow	9	(0)
2007–2008	→ Sporting CP (loan)	5	(0)
2008–2009	→ Sparta Prague (loan)	4	(0)
2010–2012	Slovan Bratislava	39	(1)
2012–2013	→ Dunajská Streda (loan)	9	(0)
2013–2014	Győri ETO	7	(0)
2015-2017	Dukla Banská Bystrica	31	(0)
2017	Petržalka	8	(0)
2017	ASK Kottingbrunn	14	(0)
2018–2024	OFK Branč	81	(16)

International career
2004–2007	Slovakia	14	(0)
- * Club domestic league appearances and goals

Marián Had (born 16 September 1982) is a Slovak former professional footballer who played mainly as a left back but also as a central defender.

== Football career ==
Born in Dolný Kubín, Slovakia, Czechoslovakia, Had started his professional career in MFK Ružomberok, competing in the Slovak Super Liga. In 2004, he was sold to 1. FC Brno in the neighbouring Czech Republic, where he spent two seasons.

On 24 November 2005, Had signed with FC Lokomotiv Moscow, becoming the club's first signing ahead of the 2006 winter transfer window, which would eventually bring 11 more players to the team along with the new manager, Slavoljub Muslin. Had's recent performance for the Slovakia national team against the national team of Russia had been highly rated by the scouts of several Russian clubs, with Lokomotiv Moscow beating competitors to the signing of the player.

There, he found himself more than often injured (knee, brain concussion, broken jawbone and cheekbone).

For the 2007–08 campaign, Had joined Sporting Clube de Portugal on loan, to replace departed Rodrigo Tello and Marco Caneira. He was initially the second-choice left-back behind Ronny and, with Leandro Grimi's arrival in January 2008 on loan from A.C. Milan, he was deemed surplus to requirements by manager Paulo Bento, subsequently returning to Lokomotiv in February.

Had was again loaned in 2008–09, now to AC Sparta Prague. In January 2010, he was definitely released and signed with ŠK Slovan Bratislava.

== Honours ==
Lokomotiv Moscow

- 2006–07 Russian Cup

Slovan Bratislava

- 2009–10 Slovak Cup

Győr

- 2012–13 Nemzeti Bajnokság I
